= 2026 O'Reilly Auto Parts 300 =

NASCAR O'Reilly Auto Parts Series race at Homestead–Miami Speedway

Race details
- Race 33 of 33 in the 2026 NASCAR O'Reilly Auto Parts Series
- Date: November 7, 2026
- Location: Homestead–Miami Speedway, in Homestead, Florida
- Course: Permanent racing facility
- Course length: 1.5 miles (2.4 km)
- Distance: 200 laps, 300 mi (482.803 km)
- Average speed: 121.457 miles per hour (195.466 km/h)

Pole position
Driver	Sheldon Creed	Haas Factory Team
- Time: 33.578

Most laps led
Driver	Sheldon Creed	Haas Factory Team
- Laps: 99

Fastest lap
Driver	Sheldon Creed	Haas Factory Team
- Time: 33.522

Winner
No. 20	Brandon Jones	Joe Gibbs Racing

Television in the United States
- Network: The CW
- Announcers: Adam Alexander, Jamie McMurray, and Parker Kligerman

Radio in the United States
- Radio: MRN
- Booth announcers: Alex Hayden and Mike Bagley
- Turn announcers: Dave Moody (1 & 2) and Kyle Rickey (3 & 4)

The 2026 O'Reilly Auto Parts 300 was a NASCAR O'Reilly Auto Parts Series race held on Saturday, November 7, 2026, at Homestead–Miami Speedway in Homestead, Florida. Contested over 200 laps on the 1.5 mile (2.4 km) oval, it was the 33rd and final race of the 2026 NASCAR O'Reilly Auto Parts Series season, the final race in the NASCAR Chase, and the 32nd running of the event.

Heading into the race, five drivers - Justin Allgaier, Jesse Love, Corey Day, Carson Kvapil, & Sheldon Creed - were all in contention to win the championship. Brandon Jones, driving for Joe Gibbs Racing, made a late pass on Kvapil and led the remaining 13 laps to earn his ninth career NASCAR O'Reilly Auto Parts Series win, and his second of the season. Sam Mayer swept both stages, and pole-sitter Creed led the race-high 99 laps. At race's end, Kvapil finished second, and Brent Crews finished third. Love and Parker Retzlaff rounded out the top five, while Creed, Allgaier, Austin Hill, Mayer, and William Sawalich rounded out the top ten.

With a seventh-place finish, Allgaier clinched the 2026 NASCAR O'Reilly Auto Parts Series championship by 14 points over his nearest challenger Love.

== Report ==
=== Background ===
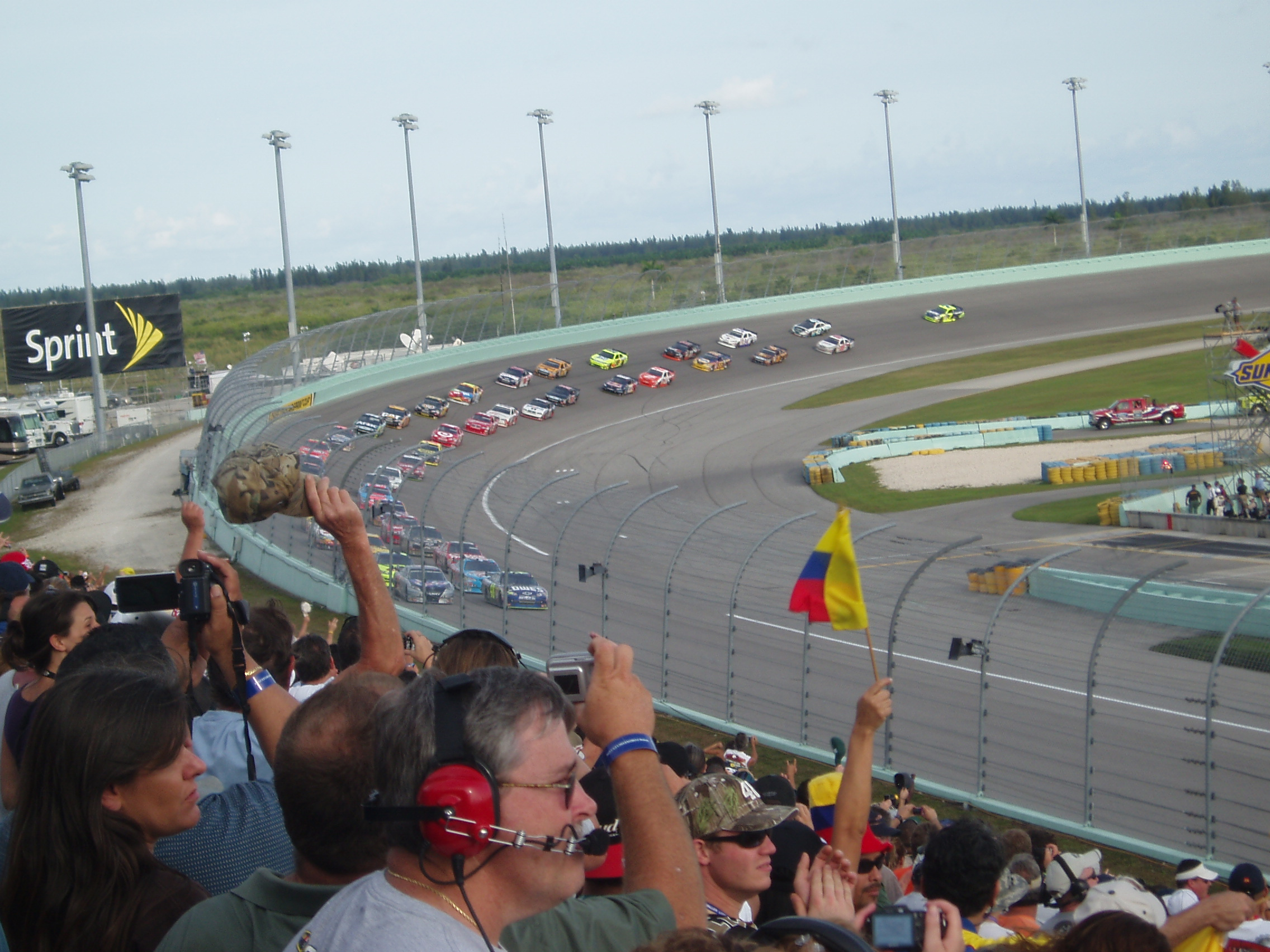
Homestead–Miami Speedway, the track where the race was held.

Homestead–Miami Speedway is a motor racing track located in Homestead, Florida. The track, which has several configurations, has promoted several series of racing, including NASCAR, the NTT IndyCar Series and the Grand-Am Rolex Sports Car Series.

From 2002 to 2019, as well as 2026, Homestead-Miami Speedway has hosted the final race of the season in all three of NASCAR's series: the NASCAR Cup Series, O'Reilly Auto Parts Series and Craftsman Truck Series.

==== Championship eligible drivers ====
- Justin Allgaier, the No. 1 seed and current points leader, earning five top fives throughout The Chase.
- Jesse Love, the No. 4 seed and defending series champion, winning at Gateway and Phoenix during The Chase. He entered 22 points behind Allgaier.
- Corey Day, the No. 7 seed, winning at Las Vegas and Charlotte during The Chase. He entered 23 points behind Allgaier, and one point behind Love.
- Carson Kvapil, the No. 2 seed, winning at Martinsville during The Chase. He entered 31 points behind Allgaier, nine points behind Love, and eight points behind Day.
- Sheldon Creed, the No. 3 seed, winning at Darlington and Bristol during The Chase. He entered 42 points behind Allgaier, 20 points behind Love, 19 points behind Day, and 11 points behind Kvapil.

==== Entry list ====
- (R) denotes rookie driver.
- (i) denotes driver who is ineligible for series driver points.
- (CC) denotes chase contender.
- (OC) denotes owners' chase contender car.

#	Driver	Team	Make
00	Sheldon Creed (CC)	Haas Factory Team	Chevrolet
0	Garrett Smithley	SS-Green Light Racing	Chevrolet
1	Carson Kvapil (CC)	JR Motorsports	Chevrolet
02	Ryan Ellis	Young's Motorsports	Chevrolet
2	Jesse Love (CC)	Richard Childress Racing	Chevrolet
07	Josh Bilicki	SS-Green Light Racing	Chevrolet
7	Justin Allgaier (CC)	JR Motorsports	Chevrolet
8	Sammy Smith (CC)	JR Motorsports	Chevrolet
17	Corey Day (CC)	Hendrick Motorsports	Chevrolet
18	William Sawalich	Joe Gibbs Racing	Toyota
19	Brent Crews (OC) (R)	Joe Gibbs Racing	Toyota
20	Brandon Jones (CC)	Joe Gibbs Racing	Toyota
21	Austin Hill (CC)	Richard Childress Racing	Chevrolet
24	Harrison Burton	Sam Hunt Racing	Toyota
26	Dean Thompson	Sam Hunt Racing	Toyota
27	Jeb Burton	Jordan Anderson Racing	Chevrolet
28	Kyle Sieg	RSS Racing	Chevrolet
31	Blaine Perkins	Jordan Anderson Racing	Chevrolet
32	Andrew Patterson	Jordan Anderson Racing	Chevrolet
38	J. J. Yeley	RSS Racing	Ford
39	Ryan Sieg	RSS Racing	Chevrolet
41	Sam Mayer (CC)	Haas Factory Team	Chevrolet
42	Brad Perez	Young's Motorsports	Chevrolet
44	Brennan Poole	Alpha Prime Racing	Chevrolet
45	Lavar Scott (R)	Alpha Prime Racing	Ford
47	Dawson Cram	Mike Harmon Racing	Chevrolet
48	Patrick Staropoli (R)	Big Machine Racing	Chevrolet
50	Preston Pardus	Pardus Racing	Chevrolet
51	Jeremy Clements	Jeremy Clements Racing	Chevrolet
53	Will Rodgers	Joey Gase Motorsports	Chevrolet
54	Taylor Gray (CC)	Joe Gibbs Racing	Toyota
55	Joey Gase	Joey Gase Motorsports	Ford
87	Nick Sanchez (i)	Peterson Racing	Chevrolet
88	Rajah Caruth (CC)	JR Motorsports	Chevrolet
91	Mason Maggio	DGM Racing	Chevrolet
92	Josh Williams	DGM Racing	Chevrolet
96	Anthony Alfredo	Viking Motorsports	Chevrolet
99	Parker Retzlaff (CC)	Viking Motorsports	Chevrolet
Official entry list

== Practice ==
The first and only practice session was held on Friday, November 6, at 4:00 PM EST, and lasted for 50 minutes.

Anthony Alfredo, driving for Viking Motorsports, set the fastest time in the session, with a lap of 33.384 seconds, and a speed of 161.754 miles per hour (260.318 km/h).

=== Practice results ===
Pos.	#	Driver	Team	Make	Time	Speed
1	96	Anthony Alfredo	Viking Motorsports	Chevrolet	33.384	161.754
2	51	Jeremy Clements	Jeremy Clements Racing	Chevrolet	33.462	161.377
3	41	Sam Mayer (CC)	Haas Factory Team	Chevrolet	33.470	161.339
Full practice results

== Qualifying ==
Qualifying was held on Saturday, November 7, at 1:00 PM EST. Since Homestead–Miami Speedway is an intermediate racetrack, the qualifying procedure used was a single-car, one-lap system with one round. Drivers were on track by themselves and had one lap to post a qualifying time, and whoever set the fastest time won the pole.

Sheldon Creed, driving for Haas Factory Team, qualified on pole position with a lap of 33.578 seconds, and a speed of 160.820 miles per hour (258.815 km/h).

No drivers failed to qualify.

=== Qualifying results ===
Pos.	#	Driver	Team	Make	Time	Speed
1	00	Sheldon Creed (CC)	Haas Factory Team	Chevrolet	33.578	160.820
2	21	Austin Hill (CC)	Richard Childress Racing	Chevrolet	33.617	160.633
3	1	Carson Kvapil (CC)	JR Motorsports	Chevrolet	33.632	160.561
4	2	Jesse Love (CC)	Richard Childress Racing	Chevrolet	33.649	160.480
5	19	Brent Crews (OC) (R)	Joe Gibbs Racing	Toyota	33.657	160.442
6	99	Parker Retzlaff (CC)	Viking Motorsports	Chevrolet	33.687	160.299
7	17	Corey Day (CC)	Hendrick Motorsports	Chevrolet	33.733	160.081
8	20	Brandon Jones (CC)	Joe Gibbs Racing	Toyota	33.753	159.986
9	18	William Sawalich	Joe Gibbs Racing	Toyota	33.786	159.830
10	87	Nick Sanchez (i)	Peterson Racing	Chevrolet	33.787	159.825
11	7	Justin Allgaier (CC)	JR Motorsports	Chevrolet	33.814	159.697
12	41	Sam Mayer (CC)	Haas Factory Team	Chevrolet	33.839	159.579
13	88	Rajah Caruth (CC)	JR Motorsports	Chevrolet	33.886	159.358
14	8	Sammy Smith (CC)	JR Motorsports	Chevrolet	33.907	159.259
15	54	Taylor Gray (CC)	Joe Gibbs Racing	Toyota	33.914	159.226
16	39	Ryan Sieg	RSS Racing	Chevrolet	33.935	159.128
17	24	Harrison Burton	Sam Hunt Racing	Toyota	33.962	159.001
18	48	Patrick Staropoli (R)	Big Machine Racing	Chevrolet	34.013	158.763
19	26	Dean Thompson	Sam Hunt Racing	Toyota	34.015	158.753
20	96	Anthony Alfredo	Viking Motorsports	Chevrolet	34.076	158.469
21	27	Jeb Burton	Jordan Anderson Racing	Chevrolet	34.101	158.353
22	51	Jeremy Clements	Jeremy Clements Racing	Chevrolet	34.165	158.056
23	32	Andrew Patterson	Jordan Anderson Racing	Chevrolet	34.192	157.932
24	53	Will Rodgers	Joey Gase Motorsports	Chevrolet	34.244	157.692
25	44	Brennan Poole	Alpha Prime Racing	Chevrolet	34.297	157.448
26	38	J. J. Yeley	RSS Racing	Ford	34.345	157.228
27	42	Brad Perez	Young's Motorsports	Chevrolet	34.362	157.150
28	31	Blaine Perkins	Jordan Anderson Racing	Chevrolet	34.390	157.022
29	45	Lavar Scott (R)	Alpha Prime Racing	Ford	34.394	157.004
30	91	Mason Maggio	DGM Racing	Chevrolet	34.401	156.972
31	28	Kyle Sieg	RSS Racing	Chevrolet	34.456	156.722
32	02	Ryan Ellis	Young's Motorsports	Chevrolet	34.465	156.681
Qualified by owner's points
33	50	Preston Pardus	Pardus Racing	Chevrolet	34.702	155.611
34	92	Josh Williams	DGM Racing	Chevrolet	34.760	155.351
35	55	Joey Gase	Joey Gase Motorsports	Ford	34.775	155.284
36	07	Josh Bilicki	SS-Green Light Racing	Chevrolet	34.832	155.030
37	0	Garrett Smithley	SS-Green Light Racing	Chevrolet	34.862	154.896
38	47	Dawson Cram	Mike Harmon Racing	Chevrolet	34.916	154.657
Official qualifying results
Official starting lineup

== Race ==
=== Race results ===
==== Stage Results ====
Stage 1 Laps: 45

Pos.	#	Driver	Team	Make	Pts
1	41	Sam Mayer (CC)	Haas Factory Team	Chevrolet	10
2	00	Sheldon Creed (CC)	Haas Factory Team	Chevrolet	9
3	2	Jesse Love (CC)	Richard Childress Racing	Chevrolet	8
4	21	Austin Hill (CC)	Richard Childress Racing	Chevrolet	7
5	1	Carson Kvapil (CC)	JR Motorsports	Chevrolet	6
6	19	Brent Crews (OC) (R)	Joe Gibbs Racing	Toyota	5
7	7	Justin Allgaier (CC)	JR Motorsports	Chevrolet	4
8	99	Parker Retzlaff (CC)	Viking Motorsports	Chevrolet	3
9	20	Brandon Jones (CC)	Joe Gibbs Racing	Toyota	2
10	8	Sammy Smith (CC)	JR Motorsports	Chevrolet	1

Stage 2 Laps: 45

Pos.	#	Driver	Team	Make	Pts
1	41	Sam Mayer (CC)	Haas Factory Team	Chevrolet	10
2	00	Sheldon Creed (CC)	Haas Factory Team	Chevrolet	9
3	2	Jesse Love (CC)	Richard Childress Racing	Chevrolet	8
4	7	Justin Allgaier (CC)	JR Motorsports	Chevrolet	7
5	21	Austin Hill (CC)	Richard Childress Racing	Chevrolet	6
6	19	Brent Crews (OC) (R)	Joe Gibbs Racing	Toyota	5
7	20	Brandon Jones (CC)	Joe Gibbs Racing	Toyota	4
8	1	Carson Kvapil (CC)	JR Motorsports	Chevrolet	3
9	99	Parker Retzlaff (CC)	Viking Motorsports	Chevrolet	2
10	18	William Sawalich	Joe Gibbs Racing	Toyota	1

=== Final Stage Results ===
Stage 3 Laps: 90

Fin	St	#	Driver	Team	Make	Laps	Led	Status	Pts
1	8	20	Brandon Jones (CC)	Joe Gibbs Racing	Toyota	200	25	Running	61
2	3	1	Carson Kvapil (CC)	JR Motorsports	Chevrolet	200	36	Running	44
3	5	19	Brent Crews (OC) (R)	Joe Gibbs Racing	Toyota	200	0	Running	44
4	4	2	Jesse Love (CC)	Richard Childress Racing	Chevrolet	200	4	Running	49
5	6	99	Parker Retzlaff (CC)	Viking Motorsports	Chevrolet	200	0	Running	37
6	1	00	Sheldon Creed (CC)	Haas Factory Team	Chevrolet	200	99	Running	50
7	11	7	Justin Allgaier (CC)	JR Motorsports	Chevrolet	200	0	Running	41
8	2	21	Austin Hill (CC)	Richard Childress Racing	Chevrolet	200	0	Running	42
9	12	41	Sam Mayer (CC)	Haas Factory Team	Chevrolet	200	36	Running	48
10	9	18	William Sawalich	Joe Gibbs Racing	Toyota	200	0	Running	28
11	31	28	Kyle Sieg	RSS Racing	Chevrolet	200	0	Running	26
12	16	39	Ryan Sieg	RSS Racing	Chevrolet	199	0	Running	25
13	24	53	Will Rodgers	Joey Gase Motorsports	Chevrolet	199	0	Running	24
14	15	54	Taylor Gray (CC)	Joe Gibbs Racing	Toyota	199	0	Running	23
15	14	8	Sammy Smith (CC)	JR Motorsports	Chevrolet	199	0	Running	23
16	10	87	Nick Sanchez (i)	Peterson Racing	Chevrolet	199	0	Running	0
17	18	48	Patrick Staropoli (R)	Big Machine Racing	Chevrolet	198	0	Running	20
18	13	88	Rajah Caruth (CC)	JR Motorsports	Chevrolet	198	0	Running	19
19	20	96	Anthony Alfredo	Viking Motorsports	Chevrolet	198	0	Running	18
20	34	92	Josh Williams	DGM Racing	Chevrolet	198	0	Running	17
21	29	45	Lavar Scott (R)	Alpha Prime Racing	Ford	198	0	Running	16
22	21	27	Jeb Burton	Jordan Anderson Racing	Chevrolet	197	0	Running	15
23	17	24	Harrison Burton	Sam Hunt Racing	Toyota	197	0	Running	14
24	33	50	Preston Pardus	Pardus Racing	Chevrolet	197	0	Running	13
25	22	51	Jeremy Clements	Jeremy Clements Racing	Chevrolet	197	0	Running	12
26	35	55	Joey Gase	Joey Gase Motorsports	Ford	196	0	Running	11
27	25	44	Brennan Poole	Alpha Prime Racing	Chevrolet	196	0	Running	10
28	28	31	Blaine Perkins	Jordan Anderson Racing	Chevrolet	196	0	Running	9
29	32	02	Ryan Ellis	Young's Motorsports	Chevrolet	195	0	Running	8
30	36	07	Josh Bilicki	SS-Green Light Racing	Chevrolet	195	0	Running	7
31	23	32	Andrew Patterson	Jordan Anderson Racing	Chevrolet	195	0	Running	6
32	27	42	Brad Perez	Young's Motorsports	Chevrolet	195	0	Running	5
33	19	26	Dean Thompson	Sam Hunt Racing	Toyota	190	0	Running	4
34	7	17	Corey Day (CC)	Hendrick Motorsports	Chevrolet	175	0	Running	3
35	38	47	Dawson Cram	Mike Harmon Racing	Chevrolet	149	0	Suspension	2
36	30	91	Mason Maggio	DGM Racing	Chevrolet	95	0	Engine	1
37	37	0	Garrett Smithley	SS-Green Light Racing	Chevrolet	71	0	Rear End	1
38	26	38	J. J. Yeley	RSS Racing	Ford	58	0	Wheel Bearing	1
Official race results

=== Race statistics ===
- Lead changes: 12 among 5 different drivers
- Cautions/Laps: 4 for 27 laps
- Red flags: 1
- Time of race: 2 hours, 28 minutes and 12 seconds
- Average speed: 121.457 miles per hour (195.466 km/h)

== Standings after the race ==
Drivers' Championship standings

	Pos	Driver	Points
	1	Justin Allgaier	2,477
	2	Jesse Love	2,463 (–14)
1	3	Carson Kvapil	2,449 (–28)
1	4	Sheldon Creed	2,444 (–33)
2	5	Corey Day	2,416 (–61)
	6	Sam Mayer	2,387 (–90)
	7	Sammy Smith	2,352 (–125)
1	8	Brandon Jones	2,314 (–163)
1	9	Taylor Gray	2,300 (–177)
	10	Austin Hill	2,281 (–196)
	11	Parker Retzlaff	2,263 (–214)
	12	Rajah Caruth	2,224 (–253)
Official driver's standings

Manufacturers' Championship standings

Pos	Manufacturer	Points
1	Chevrolet	1,734
2	Toyota	1,143 (–591)
3	Ford	309 (–1,425)

- Note: Only the first 12 positions are included for the driver standings.

Previous race: 2026 National Debt Relief 250	NASCAR O'Reilly Auto Parts Series; 2026 season	Next race: 2027 United Rentals 300
