= Peterson Racing =

NASCAR team

- Owner: Doug Peterson
- Base: Sanford, North Carolina
- Series: NASCAR O'Reilly Auto Parts Series; IMSA Ford Mustang Challenge
- Race drivers: O'Reilly Series: 78. Harrison Burton; 87. Lee Pulliam; IMSA Ford Mustang Challenge: 87. Doug Peterson
- Manufacturer: Chevrolet (NASCAR); Ford (IMSA)
- Opened: 2020

Career
- Races competed: O'Reilly Series: 36; Trans-Am Series: 52; IMSA Ford Mustang Challenge: 18
- Drivers' Championships: O'Reilly Series: 0 Trans-Am Series: 1 (2021); IMSA Ford Mustang Challenge: 0
- Race victories: O'Reilly Series: 0 Trans-Am Series: 9 IMSA Ford Mustang Challenge: 0
- Pole positions: O'Reilly Series: 0 Trans-Am Series: 7 IMSA Ford Mustang Challenge: 0

Peterson Racing (also known as Peterson Racing Group) is an American professional stock car and sports car racing team that competes in the NASCAR O'Reilly Auto Parts Series, fielding the No. 78 Chevrolet Camaro full-time for Harrison Burton and the No. 87 full-time for Lee Pulliam as well as in the IMSA Ford Mustang Challenge.

== O'Reilly Auto Parts Series ==
=== Car No. 78 history ===
On October 11, 2026, it was announced that Harrison Burton will drive the No. 78 full-time in 2027 as part of a multi-year agreement.

=== Car No. 87 history ===
==== 2023 ====
Peterson Racing Group attempted to make their debut in the series in 2023 in the race at the Charlotte Motor Speedway Roval. Road course ringer Andy Lally would drive their No. 87 car, but failed to qualify for the race due to a qualifying rainout and the team not having any owner points being their first attempt.

==== 2024–2025: Partnership with Jordan Anderson Racing ====
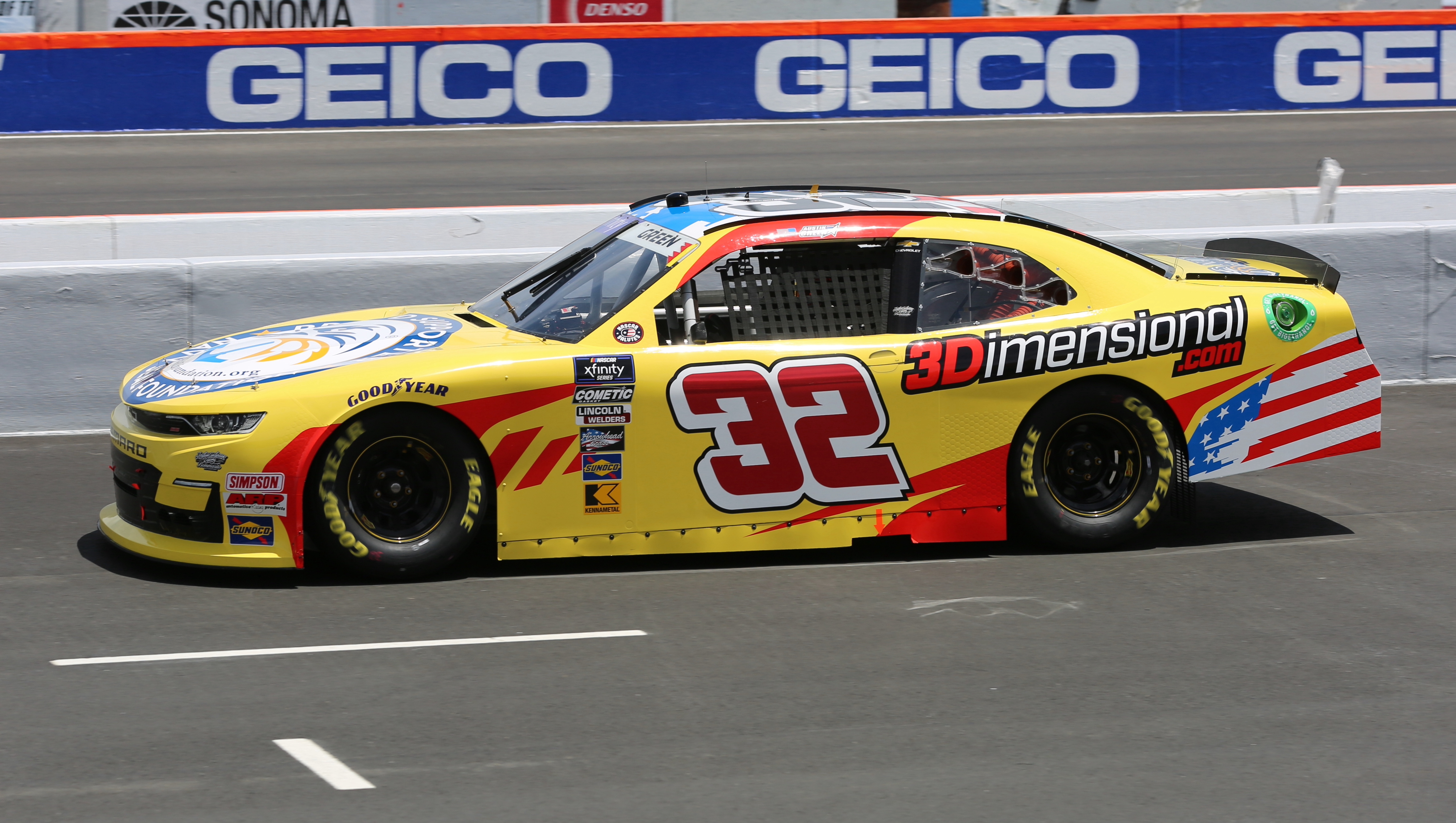
Green's No. 32 car at Sonoma Raceway in 2024

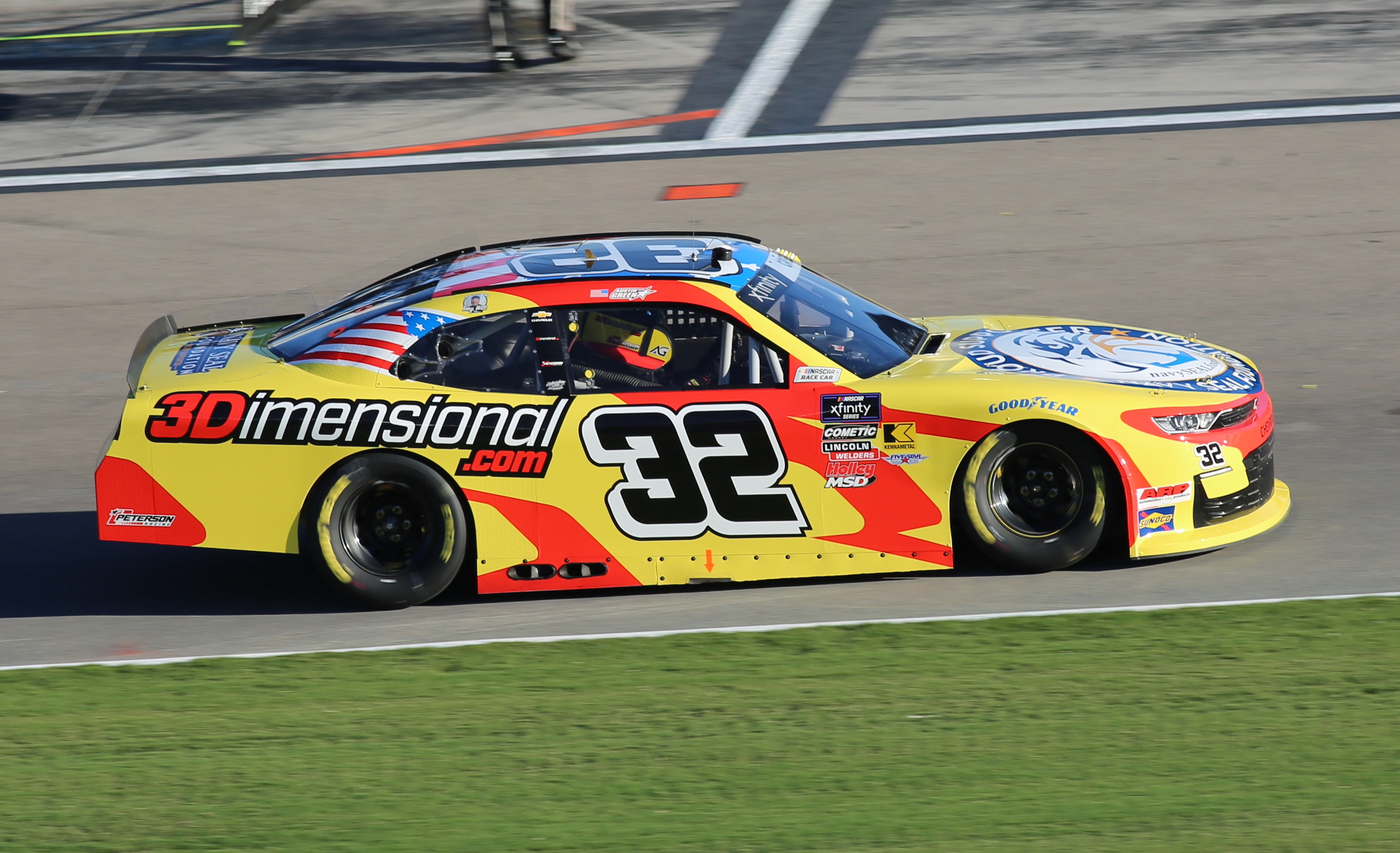
Green's No. 32 car at Las Vegas Motor Speedway in 2025

In 2024, PRG announced that they would run an expanded part-time schedule in 2024 with Austin Green, one of their Trans-Am drivers, driving the No. 87 car. He would also return to the team in the Trans-Am Series that year. However, after the season started, they formed a partnership with Jordan Anderson Racing to field Green in their No. 32 car, another part-time car that had attempted the first four races of the season before Green's first start of the season in the fifth race of the year at Circuit of the Americas. This allowed PRG to share owner points with JAR to allow Green a better chance to qualify for races. The two teams would collaborate to field the car in all of Green's races in it.

The No. 87 car would return later in 2024 in the race at Watkins Glen as a fourth Jordan Anderson Racing entry with Peterson Racing Group supporting the effort in the same way as the No. 32 car with Green. Raphael Matos, one of the team's Trans-Am drivers, was slated to make his NASCAR debut in the event, but the deal fell through, likely because he would not be approved having no previous stock car experience. Mike Skeen, another road course ringer who had previous NASCAR experience and had also driven for Peterson in Trans-Am, drove the car in this race instead.

In 2025, Green returned to the Jordan Anderson Racing No. 32 car for another part-time Xfinity Series schedule, again with Peterson Racing Group collaborating to field his entry in each of his races. JAR and PRG would also field the No. 87 car in two races for Green when another driver was in the No. 32 car: Rockingham, Talladega in the spring, and the Charlotte Roval, where Green would earn a second-place finish.

==== Multiple drivers (2026) ====
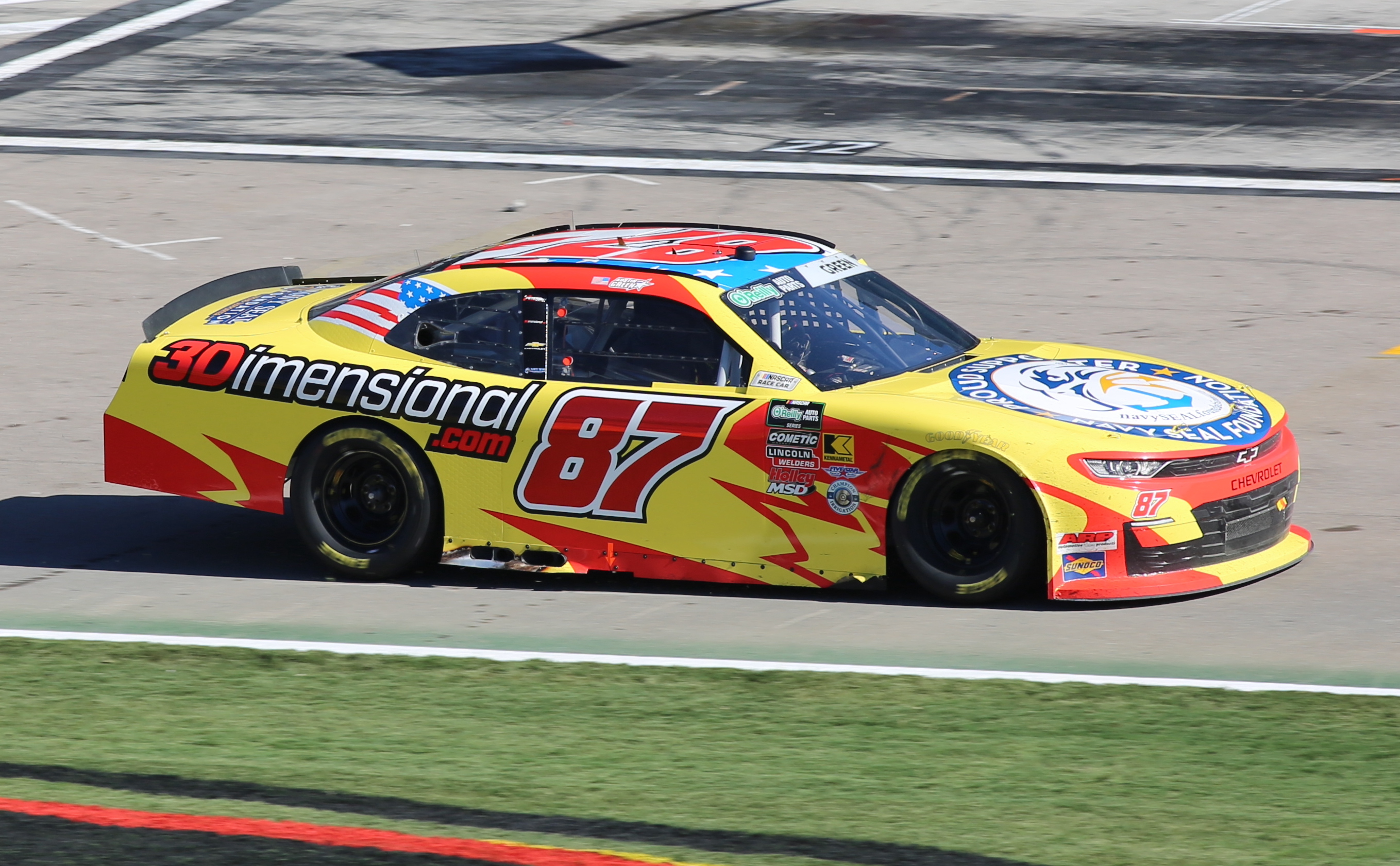
Austin Green in the No. 87 car at Las Vegas Motor Speedway in 2026

On December 5, 2025, the team, now known as just Peterson Racing, announced that Green would run the full season for them in the renamed O'Reilly Auto Parts Series in 2026 in their No. 87 car. They would split up from JAR for the first time in two years. Peterson Racing also formed a new technical alliance with Richard Childress Racing to get their new independent team off the ground.

On May 31, 2026, it was announced that Green would share the No. 87 car with Nick Sanchez.

==== Lee Pulliam (2027) ====
On August 25, 2026, Peterson Racing announced Lee Pulliam would run the No. 87 full-time for the 2027 season.

==== Car No. 87 results ====
| Year | Driver | No. | Make | 1 | 2 | 3 | 4 | 5 | 6 | 7 | 8 | 9 | 10 | 11 | 12 | 13 | 14 | 15 | 16 | 17 | 18 | 19 | 20 | 21 | 22 | 23 | 24 | 25 | 26 | 27 | 28 | 29 | 30 | 31 | 32 | 33 | Owners | Pts |
|---|---|---|---|---|---|---|---|---|---|---|---|---|---|---|---|---|---|---|---|---|---|---|---|---|---|---|---|---|---|---|---|---|---|---|---|---|---|---|
| 2023 | Andy Lally | 87 | Chevy | DAY | CAL | LVS | PHO | ATL | COA | RCH | MAR | TAL | DOV | DAR | CLT | PIR | SON | NSH | CSC | ATL | NHA | POC | ROA | MCH | IRC | GLN | DAY | DAR | KAN | BRI | TEX | ROV; DNQ | LVS | HOM | MAR | PHO | N/A | 0 |
| 2024 | Mike Skeen | 87 | Chevy | DAY | ATL | LVS | PHO | COA | RCH | MAR | TEX | TAL | DOV | DAR | CLT | PIR | SON | IOW | NHA | NSH | CSC | POC | IND | MCH | DAY | DAR | ATL | GLN; 30 | BRI | KAN | TAL | ROV | LVS | HOM | MAR | PHO | 50th | 7 |
| 2025 | Austin Green | 87 | Chevy | DAY | ATL | COA | PHO | LVS | HOM | MAR | DAR | BRI | CAR; 30 | TAL; DNQ | TEX | CLT | NSH | MXC | POC | ATL | CSC | SON | DOV | IND | IOW | GLN | DAY | PIR | GTW | BRI | KAN | ROV; 2 | LVS | TAL | MAR | PHO | 45th | 22 |
| 2026 | Austin Green | 87 | Chevy | DAY; 22 | ATL; 21 | COA; 33 | PHO; 22 | LVS; 25 | DAR; 28 | MAR; 29 | ROC; 33 | BRI; 35 | KAN; 32 | TAL; 10 | TEX; 35 | GLN; 9 | DOV; 12 | CLT; 16 | NSH; 30 | | COR; 8 | SON; 12 | | | | | | | | | | CLT; 23 | | | | | 24th | 544 |
| 2026 | Nick Sanchez | 87 | Chevy | | | | | | | | | | | | | | | | | POC; 23 | | | CHI; 12 | ATL; 19 | IND; 20 | IOW; 6 | DAY; 16 | DAR; 14 | GTW; 34 | BRI; 16 | | | PHO; 22 | | | HOM; 16 | 24th | 544 |
| 2026 | Lee Pulliam | 87 | Chevy | | | | | | | | | | | | | | | | | | | | | | | | | | | | LVS; 18 | | | TAL; 22 | MAR; 14 | | 24th | 544 |

== Trans-Am Series ==
The team's drivers in the Trans-Am Series have included Adam Andretti, Austin Green, Raphael Matos, Mike Skeen and team owner Doug Peterson. Matos and Peterson are both multi-time Trans-Am champions.

== IMSA Ford Mustang Challenge ==
In 2025, the team would compete in IMSA Ford Mustang Challenge in the Dark Horse class with owner Doug Peterson behind the wheel. Raphael Matos was brought in to drive the car for the season finale at Charlotte Roval.

In 2026, Peterson returned to drive the car in the Dark Horse class full-time.

=== Complete IMSA Ford Mustang Challenge results ===
(key) Races in bold indicates pole position. Races in italics indicates fastest lap.

| Year | Entrant | Class | Drivers | No. | Rds. | Rounds | | | | | | | | | | | | Pts. | Pos. |
| Year | Entrant | Class | Drivers | No. | Rds. | 1 | | 2 | | 3 | | 4 | | 5 | | 6 | | Pts. | Pos. |
|---|---|---|---|---|---|---|---|---|---|---|---|---|---|---|---|---|---|---|---|
| 2025 | (United States) Peterson Racing | Dark Horse | (United States) Doug Peterson | 87 | 4 | SEB; 8 | SEB; 6 | LGA; 7 | LGA; 8 | ROA; 5 | ROA; 10 | VIR; 5 | VIR; 8 | COA | COA | | | | |
| 2025 | (United States) Peterson Racing | Dark Horse | (Brazil) Raphael Matos | 87 | 1 | | | | | | | | | | | CLT; 8 | CLT; 7 | | |
| 2026 | (United States) Peterson Racing | Dark Horse | (United States) Doug Peterson | 87 | 4 | SEB; 9 | SEB; 9 | LGA; 7 | LGA; 8 | MOH; 8 | MOH; 8 | WGI; 8 | WGI; 8 | VIR | VIR | COA | COA | | |
