= Viking Motorsports =

American stock car racing team

- Owner(s): Don Sackett; Susanne Moller
- Base: Mooresville, North Carolina
- Series: NASCAR O'Reilly Auto Parts Series
- Race drivers: 96. Anthony Alfredo; 99. Parker Retzlaff
- Manufacturer: Chevrolet
- Opened: 2024

Career
- Debut: 2024 Raptor King of Tough 250 (Atlanta)
- Latest race: 2026 O'Reilly Auto Parts 300 (Homestead)
- Races competed: 96
- Drivers' Championships: 0
- Race victories: 0
- Pole positions: 0

Viking Motorsports is an American professional stock car racing team that currently competes in the NASCAR O'Reilly Auto Parts Series. The team is owned by the CEO of SciAps Inc Don Sackett. The team fields the No. 96 Chevrolet Camaro SS for Anthony Alfredo and the No. 99 for Parker Retzlaff full–time. The team has an enhanced technical alliance with Richard Childress Racing.

== O'Reilly Auto Parts Series ==
=== Car No. 38 history ===
==== 2024: Collaboration with RSS Racing ====
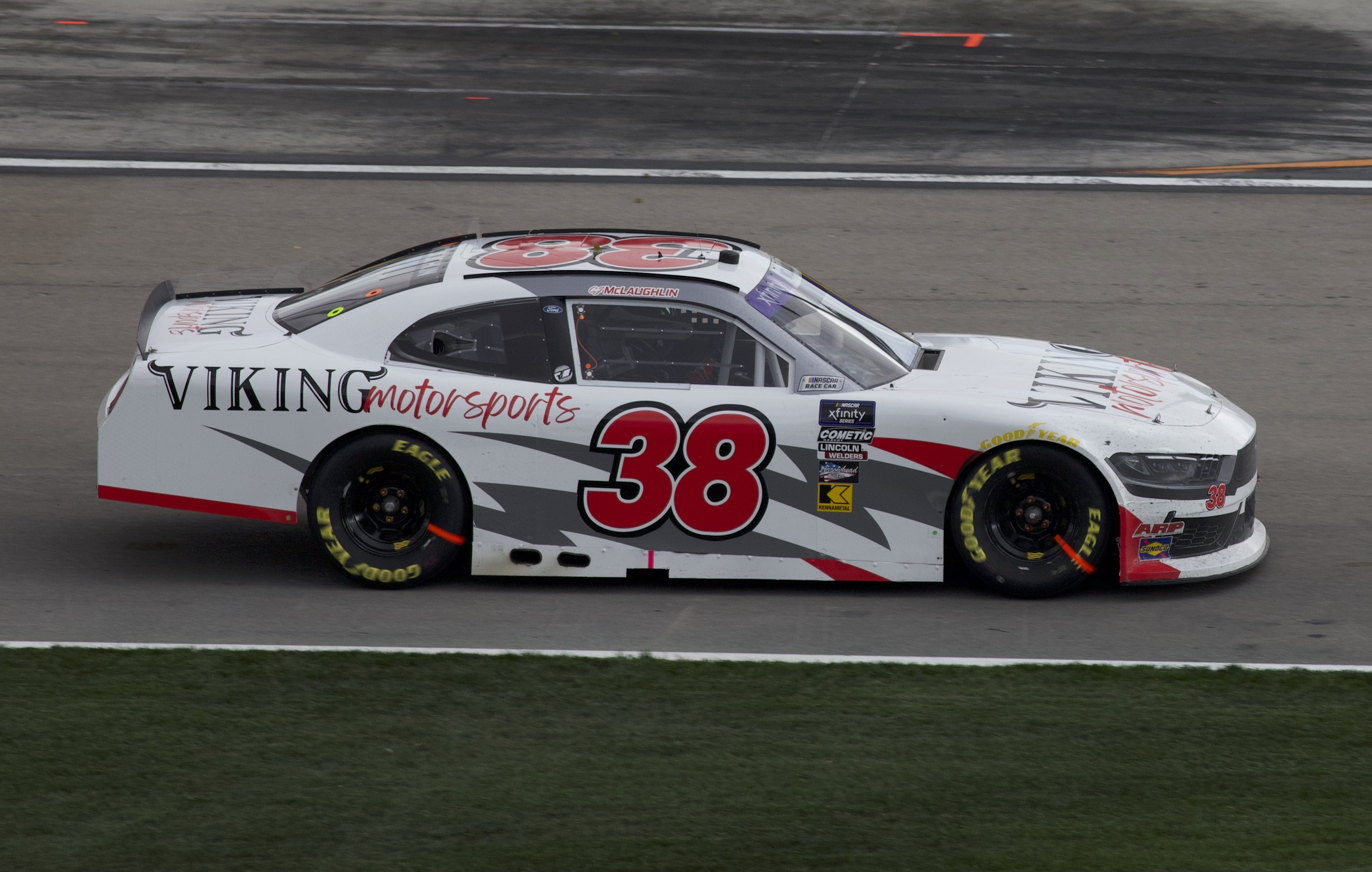
C. J. McLaughlin in the No. 38 car at Las Vegas Motor Speedway in 2024.

On January 12, 2024, it was announced that C. J. McLaughlin would drive the No. 38 car part-time for the team. After failing to qualify in two of the first four races, the team skipped COTA and replaced McLaughlin with Matt DiBenedetto for the remainder of the season. It was also revealed that the entry was being fielded by Viking Motorsports, owned by Don Sackett, CEO of SciAps Inc., in collaboration with RSS Racing. The crew chief, crew, and hauler were supplied by RSS Racing, while the driver, car, and spotter were provided by Viking Motorsports. The entry was officially fielded under RSS Racing, with sponsorship from Viking Motorsports, and the purse was shared between the two teams.

==== Car No. 38 results ====
Year	Driver	No.	Make	1	2	3	4	5	6	7	8	9	10	11	12	13	14	15	16	17	18	19	20	21	22	23	24	25	26	27	28	29	30	31	32	33	Owners	Pts
2024	C. J. McLaughlin	38	Ford	DAY; DNQ	ATL; 35	LVS; 33	PHO; DNQ	COA																													30th	399
2024	Matt DiBenedetto	38	Ford						RCH; 18	MAR; 21	TEX; 20	TAL; 8	DOV; 32	DAR; 25	CLT; 26	PIR; 31	SON; 21	IOW; 7	NHA; 38	NSH; 29	CSC; 23	POC; 24	IND; 16	MCH; 7	DAY; 33	DAR; 19	ATL; 35	GLN; 35	BRI; 34	KAN; 14	TAL; 16	ROV; 22	LVS; 16	HOM; 38	MAR; 16	PHO; 26	30th	399

=== Car No. 96 History ===
Anthony Alfredo (2026-present)

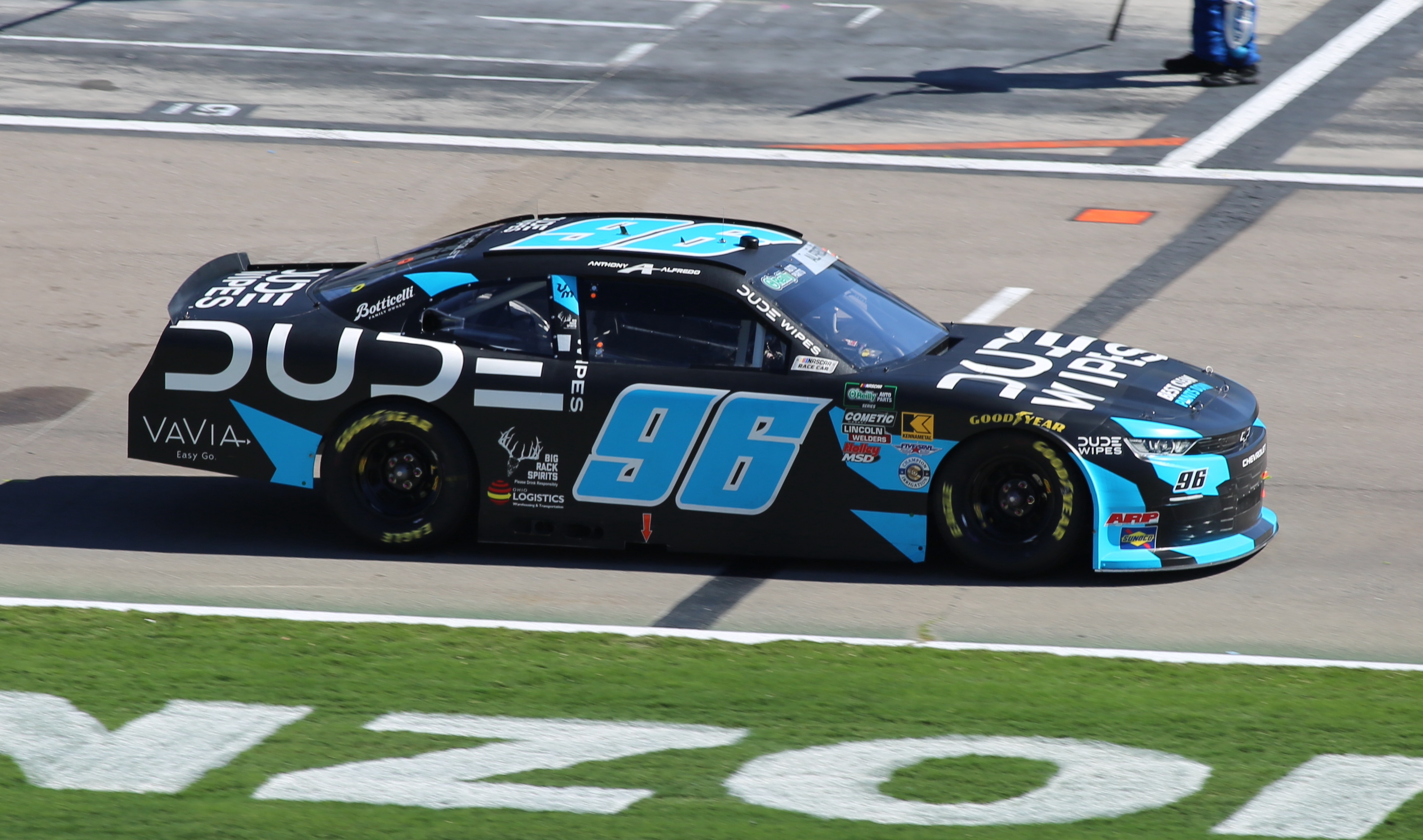
Anthony Alfredo in the No. 96 car at Las Vegas Motor Speedway in 2026

On December 4th, 2025, Viking made an announcement that they would expand to two full-time teams, the No. 96 and the No. 99. Anthony Alfredo was named as the full-time driver of the No. 96. Alfredo failed to qualify at Daytona. As the result, he drove the No. 4 car of Alpha Prime Racing for the race. During the 2026 Pit Boss/FoodMaxx 250, Alfredo would score the team their first ever stage win.

==== Car No. 96 results ====
Year	Driver	No.	Make	1	2	3	4	5	6	7	8	9	10	11	12	13	14	15	16	17	18	19	20	21	22	23	24	25	26	27	28	29	30	31	32	33	Owners	Pts
2026	Anthony Alfredo	96	Chevy	DAY; DNQ	ATL; 25	COA; 23	PHO; 10	LVS; 34	DAR; 12	MAR; 15	ROC; 24	BRI; 36	KAN; 30	TAL; 31	TEX; 12	GLN; 27	DOV; 10	CLT; 13	NSH; 17	POC; 6	COR; 35	SON; 4	CHI; 26	ATL; 5	IND; 14	IOW; 19	DAY; 4	DAR; 6	GTW; 22	BRI; 32	LVS; 10	CLT; 8	PHO; 17	TAL; 10	MAR; 17	HOM; 19	16th	709

=== Car No. 99 history ===
Matt DiBenedetto (2025)

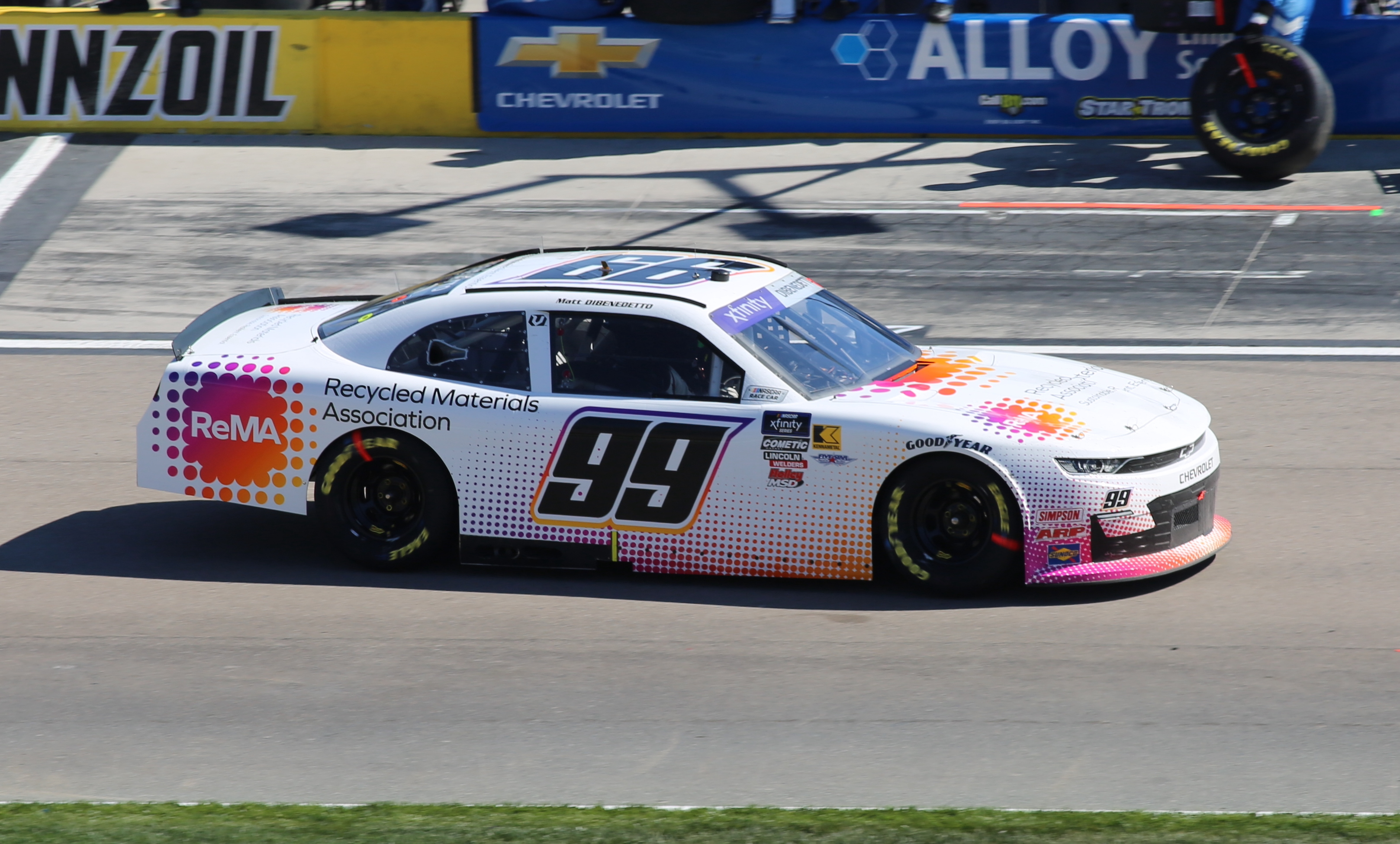
Matt DiBenedetto in the No. 99 car at Las Vegas Motor Speedway in 2025

On December 14, 2024, team owner Don Sackett announced Viking Motorsports would switch from Ford to Chevrolet, with Matt DiBenedetto returning to drive the renumbered No. 99. On December 16, Sackett announced that the team would not form a technical alliance. DiBenedetto started season with back-to-back top-fifteens in the first two races at the 2025 United Rentals 300 and the 2025 Bennett Transportation & Logistics 250. DiBenedetto got his career best result in the NASCAR Xfinity Series at the 2025 Ag-Pro 300 at Talladega, finishing fifth.

On October 13, 2025, DiBendetto parted ways with the team and Connor Mosack replaced him for the last three races of the season.

Parker Retzlaff (2026-present)

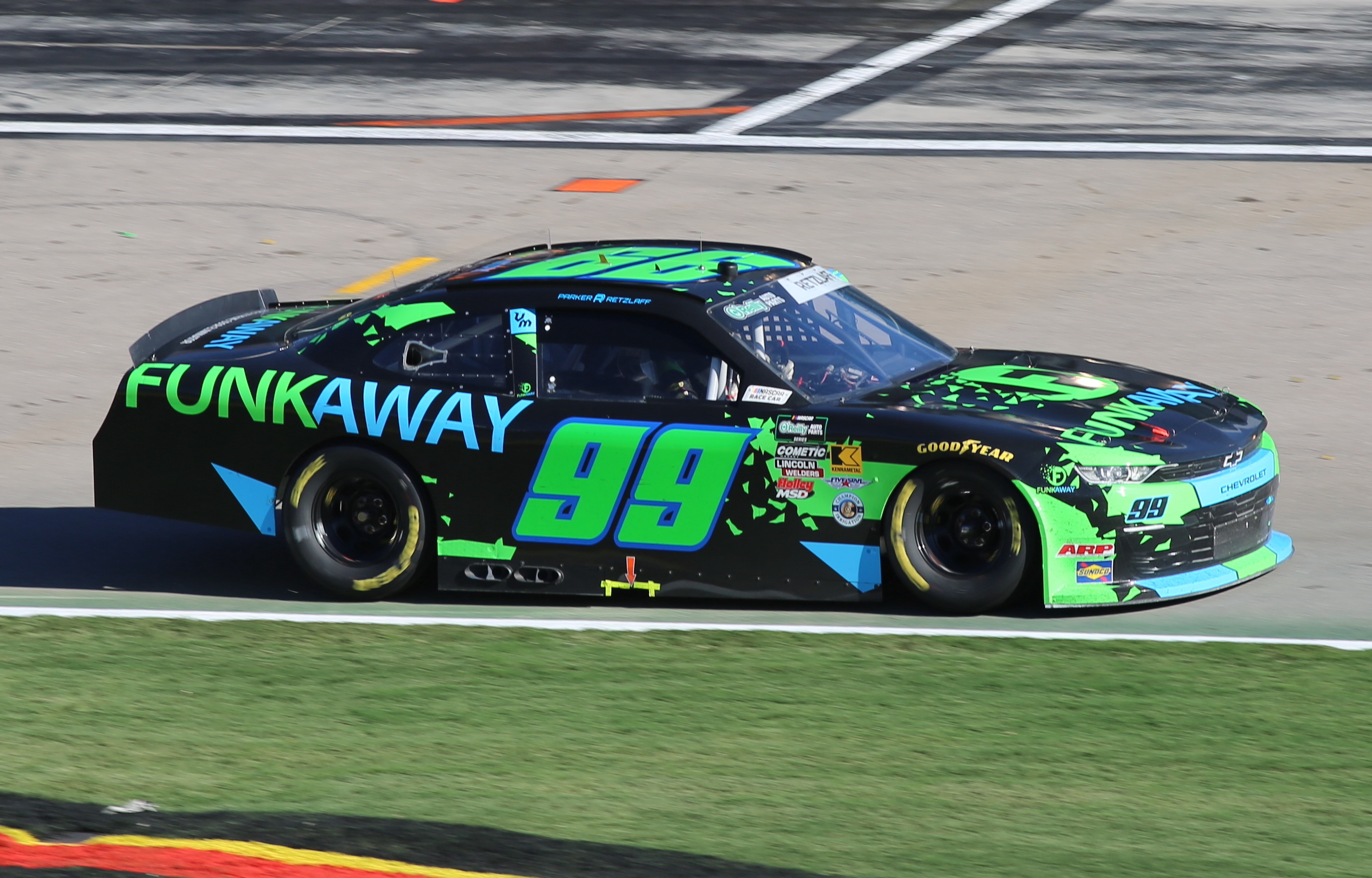
Parker Retzlaff in the No. 99 car at Las Vegas Motor Speedway in 2026

On November 7, 2025, Viking Motorsports announced Parker Retzlaff as the full-time driver of the No. 99 in 2026. During the 24-race regular season, Retzlaff recorded 21 top-15 finishes, earning four top-fives and ten top-tens. This consistency earned him his first Chase appearance.

==== Car No. 99 results ====
Year	Driver	No.	Make	1	2	3	4	5	6	7	8	9	10	11	12	13	14	15	16	17	18	19	20	21	22	23	24	25	26	27	28	29	30	31	32	33	Owners	Pts
2025	Matt DiBenedetto	99	Chevy	DAY; 11	ATL; 12	COA; 32	PHO; 27	LVS; 16	HOM; 36	MAR; 26	DAR; 23	BRI; 23	CAR; 27	TAL; 5	TEX; 15	CLT; 36	NSH; 32	MXC; 16	POC; 19	ATL; 15	CSC; 28	SON; 26	DOV; 14	IND; 11	IOW; 35	GLN; 33	DAY; 33	PIR; 34	GTW; 11	BRI; 24	KAN; 23	ROV; 32	LVS; 19				25th	471
2025	Connor Mosack	99	Chevy																															TAL; 28	MAR; 25	PHO; 22	25th	471
2026	Parker Retzlaff	99	Chevy	DAY; 14	ATL; 2	COA; 30	PHO; 14	LVS; 12	DAR; 8	MAR; 11	ROC; 8	BRI; 9	KAN; 36	TAL; 9	TEX; 5	GLN; 7	DOV; 38	CLT; 12	NSH; 12	POC; 15	COR; 7	SON; 5	CHI; 14	ATL; 3	IND; 11	IOW; 13	DAY; 14	DAR; 21	GTW; 6	BRI; 8	LVS; 19	CLT; 12	PHO; 11	TAL; 31	MAR; 15	HOM; 5	12th	2253
