= 2026 MillerTech Battery 250 =

NASCAR O'Reilly Auto Parts Series race at Pocono Raceway

2026 MillerTech Battery 250 Presented By KOA
Race details
- Race 17 of 33 in the 2026 NASCAR O'Reilly Auto Parts Series
- Date: June 13, 2026
- Location: Pocono Raceway in Blakeslee, Pennsylvania
- Course: Permanent racing facility
- Course length: 2.5 miles (4.0 km)
- Distance: 100 laps, 250 mi (402.336 km)
- Average speed: 99.032 miles per hour (159.377 km/h)

Pole position
Driver	Brandon Jones	Joe Gibbs Racing
- Time: 54.686

Most laps led
Driver	Justin Allgaier	JR Motorsports
- Laps: 35

Fastest lap
Driver	Justin Allgaier	JR Motorsports
- Time: 55.342

Winner
No. 7	Justin Allgaier	JR Motorsports

Television in the United States
- Network: The CW
- Announcers: Adam Alexander, Jamie McMurray and Ross Chastain

Radio in the United States
- Radio: MRN
- Booth announcers: Alex Hayden and Mike Bagley
- Turn announcers: Kyle Rickey (1), Tim Catalfamo (2), Nathan Prouty (3)

The 2026 MillerTech Battery 250 Presented By KOA was a NASCAR O'Reilly Auto Parts Series race held on Saturday, June 13, 2026, at Pocono Raceway in Blakeslee, Pennsylvania. Contested over 100 laps on the 2.5-mile (4.0 km) oval, it was the 17th race of the 2026 NASCAR O'Reilly Auto Parts Series season, and the 11th running of the event.

Justin Allgaier, driving for JR Motorsports, pulled off a dominant performance, leading a race-high 35 laps and holding off the field on the final restart to earn his 33rd career NASCAR O'Reilly Auto Parts Series win, and his fifth of the season. With his win, Allgaier also clinched a spot into the Chase. Taylor Gray led 24 laps and won the first stage, and Brent Crews won stage two, leading 9 laps. Crews finished second, and William Byron finished third. Sam Mayer and Sheldon Creed rounded out the top five, while Anthony Alfredo, Rajah Caruth, Brandon Jones, Connor Zilisch, and Carson Kvapil rounded out the top ten.

== Report ==
=== Background ===
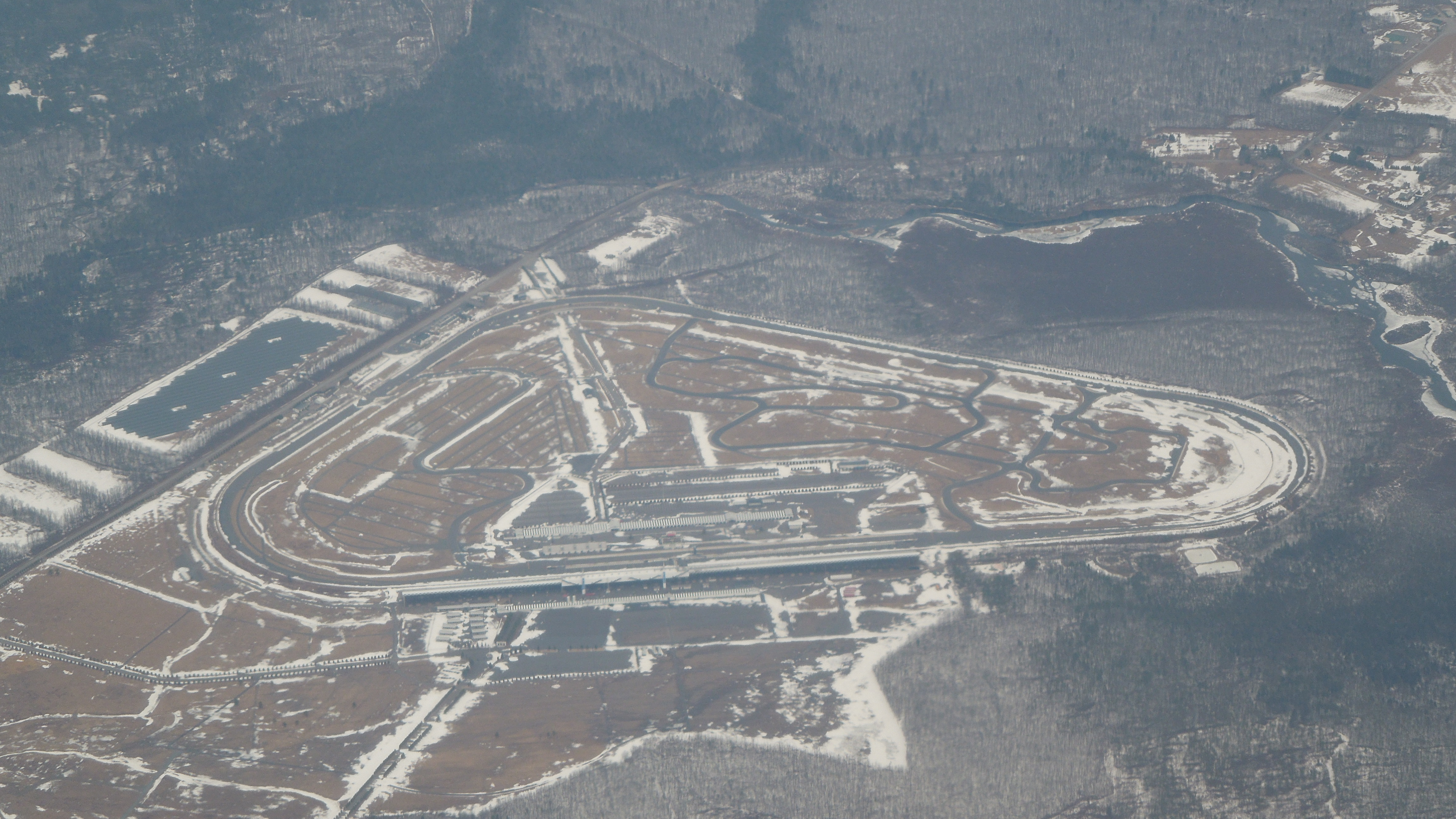
Pocono Raceway, the track where the race will be held.

Pocono Raceway is a 2.5-mile (4.0 km) oval speedway located in Blakeslee, Pennsylvania, which has hosted NASCAR racing annually since the early 1970s. Nicknamed "The Tricky Triangle", the speedway has three distinct corners and is known for high speeds along its lengthy straightaways.

From 1982 to 2019, the circuit had two NASCAR (often with ARCA in each) race weekends. Then in 2020, the circuit was reduced to just one race meeting while having two races. The first race was moved over to World Wide Technology Raceway which is near St. Louis starting in 2022.

MillerTech Battery, who sponsored the Craftsman Truck Series race in 2025, was announced as title sponsor on January 29, 2026.

==== Entry list ====
- (R) denotes rookie driver.
- (i) denotes driver who is ineligible for series driver points.

#	Driver	Team	Make
00	Sheldon Creed	Haas Factory Team	Chevrolet
0	Cole Custer (i)	SS-Green Light Racing	Chevrolet
1	Connor Zilisch (i)	JR Motorsports	Chevrolet
02	Ryan Ellis	Young's Motorsports	Chevrolet
2	Jesse Love	Richard Childress Racing	Chevrolet
07	Josh Bilicki	SS-Green Light Racing	Chevrolet
7	Justin Allgaier	JR Motorsports	Chevrolet
8	Sammy Smith	JR Motorsports	Chevrolet
9	Carson Kvapil	JR Motorsports	Chevrolet
17	Corey Day	Hendrick Motorsports	Chevrolet
18	William Sawalich	Joe Gibbs Racing	Toyota
19	Brent Crews (R)	Joe Gibbs Racing	Toyota
20	Brandon Jones	Joe Gibbs Racing	Toyota
21	Austin Hill	Richard Childress Racing	Chevrolet
24	Harrison Burton	Sam Hunt Racing	Toyota
26	Dean Thompson	Sam Hunt Racing	Toyota
27	Jeb Burton	Jordan Anderson Racing	Chevrolet
28	Kyle Sieg	RSS Racing	Chevrolet
31	Blaine Perkins	Jordan Anderson Racing	Chevrolet
32	Rajah Caruth	Jordan Anderson Racing	Chevrolet
35	Carson Ware	Joey Gase Motorsports	Chevrolet
38	Patrick Emerling (i)	RSS Racing	Chevrolet
39	Ryan Sieg	RSS Racing	Chevrolet
41	Sam Mayer	Haas Factory Team	Chevrolet
42	Nathan Byrd	Young's Motorsports	Chevrolet
44	Brennan Poole	Alpha Prime Racing	Chevrolet
45	Lavar Scott (R)	Alpha Prime Racing	Chevrolet
48	Patrick Staropoli (R)	Big Machine Racing	Chevrolet
51	Jeremy Clements	Jeremy Clements Racing	Chevrolet
53	Natalie Decker (i)	Joey Gase Motorsports	Toyota
54	Taylor Gray	Joe Gibbs Racing	Toyota
55	Joey Gase	Joey Gase Motorsports	Ford
87	Nick Sanchez	Peterson Racing	Chevrolet
88	William Byron (i)	JR Motorsports	Chevrolet
91	Dexter Bean	DGM Racing	Chevrolet
92	Leland Honeyman (i)	DGM Racing	Chevrolet
96	Anthony Alfredo	Viking Motorsports	Chevrolet
99	Parker Retzlaff	Viking Motorsports	Chevrolet
Official entry list

== Practice ==
The first and only practice session was held on Saturday, June 13, at 10:30 AM EST, and lasted for 50 minutes.

Jesse Love, driving for Richard Childress Racing, set the fastest time in the session, with a lap of 54.902 seconds, and a speed of 163.928 miles per hour (263.817 km/h).

=== Practice results ===
Pos.	#	Driver	Team	Make	Time	Speed
1	2	Jesse Love	Richard Childress Racing	Chevrolet	54.902	163.928
2	20	Brandon Jones	Joe Gibbs Racing	Toyota	55.014	163.595
3	96	Anthony Alfredo	Viking Motorsports	Chevrolet	55.095	163.354
Full practice results

== Qualifying ==
Qualifying was held on Saturday, June 13, at 11:35 AM EST. Standard intermediate track qualifying was in effect, although at Pocono, a hybrid road course qualifying rule was used. The timing line was set in the North Straight, exiting Turn 2, where cars exited pit road, drove two-thirds of a lap, then took the green flag at the timing line exiting Turn 2, and completing their lap there the next time by. Teams then immediately pitted the car, meaning only two laps were run. In addition, up to three cars could be at the track at one time, separated by considerable intervals (about 20 seconds) to ensure drafting was prohibited.

Brandon Jones, driving for Joe Gibbs Racing, qualified on pole position with a lap of 54.686 seconds, and a speed of 164.576 miles per hour (264.859 km/h).

No drivers failed to qualify.

=== Qualifying results ===
Pos.	#	Driver	Team	Make	Time	Speed
1	20	Brandon Jones	Joe Gibbs Racing	Toyota	54.686	164.576
2	54	Taylor Gray	Joe Gibbs Racing	Toyota	54.749	164.387
3	88	William Byron (i)	JR Motorsports	Chevrolet	54.787	164.273
4	7	Justin Allgaier	JR Motorsports	Chevrolet	54.798	164.240
5	8	Sammy Smith	JR Motorsports	Chevrolet	54.923	163.866
6	9	Carson Kvapil	JR Motorsports	Chevrolet	54.959	163.758
7	41	Sam Mayer	Haas Factory Team	Chevrolet	55.008	163.613
8	19	Brent Crews (R)	Joe Gibbs Racing	Toyota	55.050	163.488
9	39	Ryan Sieg	RSS Racing	Chevrolet	55.119	163.283
10	18	William Sawalich	Joe Gibbs Racing	Toyota	55.122	163.274
11	17	Corey Day	Hendrick Motorsports	Chevrolet	55.169	163.135
12	96	Anthony Alfredo	Viking Motorsports	Chevrolet	55.221	162.981
13	99	Parker Retzlaff	Viking Motorsports	Chevrolet	55.298	162.755
14	1	Connor Zilisch (i)	JR Motorsports	Chevrolet	55.304	162.737
15	51	Jeremy Clements	Jeremy Clements Racing	Chevrolet	55.343	162.622
16	00	Sheldon Creed	Haas Factory Team	Chevrolet	55.354	162.590
17	21	Austin Hill	Richard Childress Racing	Chevrolet	55.406	162.437
18	27	Jeb Burton	Jordan Anderson Racing	Chevrolet	55.462	162.273
19	44	Brennan Poole	Alpha Prime Racing	Chevrolet	55.538	162.051
20	28	Kyle Sieg	RSS Racing	Chevrolet	55.619	161.815
21	2	Jesse Love	Richard Childress Racing	Chevrolet	55.722	161.516
22	87	Nick Sanchez	Peterson Racing	Chevrolet	55.873	161.080
23	24	Harrison Burton	Sam Hunt Racing	Toyota	56.035	160.614
24	02	Ryan Ellis	Young's Motorsports	Chevrolet	56.039	160.602
25	45	Lavar Scott (R)	Alpha Prime Racing	Chevrolet	56.196	160.154
26	32	Rajah Caruth	Jordan Anderson Racing	Chevrolet	56.221	160.083
27	48	Patrick Staropoli (R)	Big Machine Racing	Chevrolet	56.221	160.083
28	38	Patrick Emerling (i)	RSS Racing	Chevrolet	56.551	159.148
29	92	Leland Honeyman (i)	DGM Racing	Chevrolet	56.553	159.143
30	35	Carson Ware	Joey Gase Motorsports	Chevrolet	57.492	156.544
31	53	Natalie Decker (i)	Joey Gase Motorsports	Toyota	57.832	155.623
32	42	Nathan Byrd	Young's Motorsports	Chevrolet	1:09.112	130.223
Qualified by owner's points
33	31	Blaine Perkins	Jordan Anderson Racing	Chevrolet	1:57.208	76.787
34	91	Dexter Bean	DGM Racing	Chevrolet	—	—
35	26	Dean Thompson	Sam Hunt Racing	Toyota	—	—
36	0	Cole Custer (i)	SS-Green Light Racing	Chevrolet	—	—
37	07	Josh Bilicki	SS-Green Light Racing	Chevrolet	—	—
38	55	Joey Gase	Joey Gase Motorsports	Ford	—	—
Official qualifying results
Official starting lineup

== Race ==
=== Race results ===
==== Stage Results ====
Stage One Laps: 25

Pos.	#	Driver	Team	Make	Pts
1	54	Taylor Gray	Joe Gibbs Racing	Toyota	10
2	41	Sam Mayer	Haas Factory Team	Chevrolet	9
3	88	William Byron (i)	JR Motorsports	Chevrolet	0
4	7	Justin Allgaier	JR Motorsports	Chevrolet	7
5	20	Brandon Jones	Joe Gibbs Racing	Toyota	6
6	00	Sheldon Creed	Haas Factory Team	Ford	5
7	8	Sammy Smith	JR Motorsports	Chevrolet	4
8	19	Brent Crews (R)	Joe Gibbs Racing	Toyota	3
9	9	Carson Kvapil	JR Motorsports	Chevrolet	2
10	21	Austin Hill	Richard Childress Racing	Chevrolet	1

Stage Two Laps: 25

Pos.	#	Driver	Team	Make	Pts
1	19	Brent Crews (R)	Joe Gibbs Racing	Toyota	10
2	7	Justin Allgaier	JR Motorsports	Chevrolet	9
3	99	Parker Retzlaff	Viking Motorsports	Chevrolet	8
4	32	Rajah Caruth	Jordan Anderson Racing	Chevrolet	7
5	88	William Byron (i)	JR Motorsports	Chevrolet	0
6	1	Connor Zilisch (i)	JR Motorsports	Chevrolet	0
7	41	Sam Mayer	Haas Factory Team	Chevrolet	4
8	51	Jeremy Clements	Jeremy Clements Racing	Chevrolet	3
9	96	Anthony Alfredo	Viking Motorsports	Chevrolet	2
10	9	Carson Kvapil	JR Motorsports	Chevrolet	1

=== Final Stage Results ===
Stage Three Laps: 50

Fin	St	#	Driver	Team	Make	Laps	Led	Status	Pts
1	4	7	Justin Allgaier	JR Motorsports	Chevrolet	100	35	Running	72
2	8	19	Brent Crews (R)	Joe Gibbs Racing	Toyota	100	9	Running	48
3	3	88	William Byron (i)	JR Motorsports	Chevrolet	100	0	Running	0
4	7	41	Sam Mayer	Haas Factory Team	Chevrolet	100	14	Running	46
5	16	00	Sheldon Creed	Haas Factory Team	Chevrolet	100	0	Running	37
6	12	96	Anthony Alfredo	Viking Motorsports	Chevrolet	100	0	Running	33
7	26	32	Rajah Caruth	Jordan Anderson Racing	Chevrolet	100	0	Running	37
8	1	20	Brandon Jones	Joe Gibbs Racing	Toyota	100	0	Running	0
9	14	1	Connor Zilisch (i)	JR Motorsports	Chevrolet	100	0	Running	0
10	6	9	Carson Kvapil	JR Motorsports	Chevrolet	100	4	Running	30
11	23	24	Harrison Burton	Sam Hunt Racing	Toyota	100	5	Running	26
12	36	0	Cole Custer (i)	SS-Green Light Racing	Chevrolet	100	0	Running	0
13	35	26	Dean Thompson	Sam Hunt Racing	Toyota	100	2	Running	24
14	17	21	Austin Hill	Richard Childress Racing	Chevrolet	100	0	Running	24
15	13	99	Parker Retzlaff	Viking Motorsports	Chevrolet	100	2	Running	30
16	15	51	Jeremy Clements	Jeremy Clements Racing	Chevrolet	100	1	Running	24
17	2	54	Taylor Gray	Joe Gibbs Racing	Toyota	100	24	Running	30
18	19	44	Brennan Poole	Alpha Prime Racing	Chevrolet	100	0	Running	19
19	5	8	Sammy Smith	JR Motorsports	Chevrolet	100	0	Running	22
20	33	31	Blaine Perkins	Jordan Anderson Racing	Chevrolet	100	0	Running	17
21	10	18	William Sawalich	Joe Gibbs Racing	Toyota	100	0	Running	16
22	37	07	Josh Bilicki	SS-Green Light Racing	Chevrolet	100	0	Running	15
23	22	87	Nick Sanchez	Peterson Racing	Chevrolet	100	0	Running	14
24	24	02	Ryan Ellis	Young's Motorsports	Chevrolet	100	0	Running	13
25	27	48	Patrick Staropoli (R)	Big Machine Racing	Chevrolet	100	0	Running	12
26	9	39	Ryan Sieg	RSS Racing	Chevrolet	100	4	Running	11
27	30	35	Carson Ware	Joey Gase Motorsports	Chevrolet	100	0	Running	10
28	18	27	Jeb Burton	Jordan Anderson Racing	Chevrolet	93	0	Accident	9
29	25	45	Lavar Scott (R)	Alpha Prime Racing	Chevrolet	93	0	Accident	8
30	34	91	Dexter Bean	DGM Racing	Chevrolet	93	0	Accident	7
31	28	38	Patrick Emerling (i)	RSS Racing	Chevrolet	81	0	Accident	0
32	20	28	Kyle Sieg	RSS Racing	Chevrolet	50	0	DVP	5
33	29	92	Leland Honeyman (i)	DGM Racing	Chevrolet	36	0	Accident	0
34	31	53	Natalie Decker (i)	Joey Gase Motorsports	Toyota	17	0	Engine	0
35	32	42	Nathan Byrd	Young's Motorsports	Chevrolet	7	0	Accident	2
36	38	55	Joey Gase	Joey Gase Motorsports	Ford	3	0	Engine	1
37	21	2	Jesse Love	Richard Childress Racing	Chevrolet	1	0	Accident	1
38	11	17	Corey Day	Hendrick Motorsports	Chevrolet	0	0	Accident	1
Official race results

=== Race statistics ===
- Lead changes: 18 among 10 different drivers
- Cautions/Laps: 10 for 39 laps
- Red flags: 1
- Time of race: 2 hours, 31 minutes and 28 seconds
- Average speed: 99.032 miles per hour (159.377 km/h)

== Standings after the race ==
Drivers' Championship standings

	Pos	Driver	Points
	1	Justin Allgaier	842
	2	Jesse Love	592 (–250)
	3	Corey Day	575 (–267)
	4	Sheldon Creed	569 (–273)
	5	Brandon Jones	547 (–295)
	6	Austin Hill	523 (–319)
	7	Carson Kvapil	523 (–319)
	8	Sammy Smith	504 (–338)
2	9	Sam Mayer	459 (–383)
	10	Parker Retzlaff	446 (–396)
2	11	William Sawalich	445 (–397)
2	12	Brent Crews	432 (–410)
Official driver's standings

Manufacturers' Championship standings

Pos	Manufacturer	Points
1	Chevrolet	894
2	Toyota	574 (–320)
3	Ford	189 (–705)

- Note: Only the first 12 positions are included for the driver standings.

Previous race: 2026 Sports Illustrated Resorts 250	NASCAR O'Reilly Auto Parts Series; 2026 season	Next race: 2026 United Rentals Driven to Serve 250
