= 2026 Nu Way 225 =

NASCAR O'Reilly Auto Parts Series race at World Wide Technology Raceway

2026 Nu Way 225 Powered by Bobcat and Sauced by Blues Hog
Race details
- Race 26 of 33 in the 2026 NASCAR O'Reilly Auto Parts Series
- Date: September 12, 2026
- Location: World Wide Technology Raceway in Madison, Illinois
- Course: Permanent racing facility
- Course length: 1.25 miles (2.01 km)
- Distance: 180 laps, 225 mi (363.102 km)
- Average speed: 92.965 miles per hour (149.613 km/h)

Pole position
Driver	Carson Kvapil	JR Motorsports
- Time: 33.626

Most laps led
Driver	Carson Kvapil	JR Motorsports
- Laps: 105

Fastest lap
Driver	Jesse Love	Richard Childress Racing
- Time: 34.045

Winner
No. 2	Jesse Love	Richard Childress Racing

Television in the United States
- Network: The CW
- Announcers: Adam Alexander and Jamie McMurray

Radio in the United States
- Radio: MRN
- Booth announcers: Alex Hayden, Mike Bagley, and Todd Gordon
- Turn announcers: Dave Moody (1 & 2) and Kurt Becker (3 & 4)

The 2026 Nu Way 225 Powered by Bobcat and Sauced by Blues Hog was a NASCAR O'Reilly Auto Parts Series race held on Saturday, September 12, 2026, at World Wide Technology Raceway in Madison, Illinois. Contested over 180 laps on the 1.25-mile (2.01 km) egg-shaped asphalt oval, it was the 26th race of the 2026 NASCAR O'Reilly Auto Parts Series season, the second race in the NASCAR Chase, and the second running of the event.

Jesse Love, driving for Richard Childress Racing, made a late pass on Carson Kvapil with 15 laps to go, and led the remaining laps to earn his fourth career NASCAR O'Reilly Auto Parts Series win, and his first of the season. Kvapil won the first stage, leading a race-high 105 laps, while Love won the second stage, leading a total of 70 laps. At race's end, Sheldon Creed finished second, and Sam Mayer finished third. Taylor Gray and Kvapil rounded out the top five, with Parker Retzlaff, Brent Crews, Sammy Smith, Kyle Sieg, and Jeb Burton rounded out the top ten.

== Report ==
=== Background ===
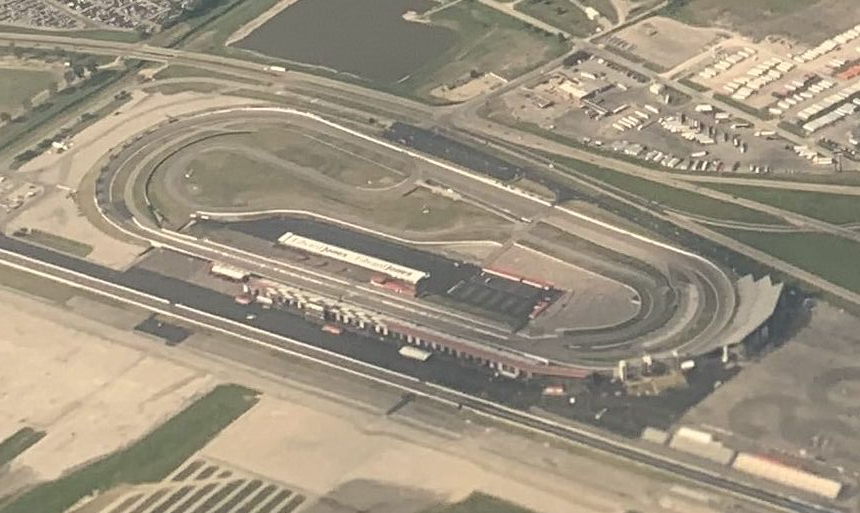
World Wide Technology Raceway, the track where the race was held.

World Wide Technology Raceway (formerly Gateway International Raceway and Gateway Motorsports Park) is a motorsport racing facility in Madison, Illinois, just east of St. Louis, Missouri, United States, close to the Gateway Arch. It features a 1.25-mile (2 kilometer) oval that hosts the NASCAR Cup Series, NASCAR O'Reilly Auto Parts Series, and the NTT IndyCar Series, a 1.6-mile (2.6 km) infield road course used by the SCCA, Porsche Club of America, and various car clubs, and a quarter-mile drag strip that hosts the annual NHRA Midwest Nationals event. It previously held the NASCAR Craftsman Truck Series.

==== Entry list ====
- (R) denotes rookie driver.
- (CC) denotes chase contender.
- (OC) denotes owners chase contender car.

#	Driver	Team	Make
00	Sheldon Creed (CC)	Haas Factory Team	Chevrolet
0	Myatt Snider	SS-Green Light Racing	Chevrolet
1	Carson Kvapil (CC)	JR Motorsports	Chevrolet
02	Ryan Ellis	Young's Motorsports	Chevrolet
2	Jesse Love (CC)	Richard Childress Racing	Chevrolet
07	Josh Bilicki	SS-Green Light Racing	Chevrolet
7	Justin Allgaier (CC)	JR Motorsports	Chevrolet
8	Sammy Smith (CC)	JR Motorsports	Chevrolet
17	Corey Day (CC)	Hendrick Motorsports	Chevrolet
18	William Sawalich	Joe Gibbs Racing	Toyota
19	Brent Crews (OC) (R)	Joe Gibbs Racing	Toyota
20	Brandon Jones (CC)	Joe Gibbs Racing	Toyota
21	Austin Hill (CC)	Richard Childress Racing	Chevrolet
24	Harrison Burton	Sam Hunt Racing	Toyota
26	Dean Thompson	Sam Hunt Racing	Toyota
27	Jeb Burton	Jordan Anderson Racing	Chevrolet
28	Kyle Sieg	RSS Racing	Chevrolet
31	Blaine Perkins	Jordan Anderson Racing	Chevrolet
32	Jordan Anderson	Jordan Anderson Racing	Chevrolet
39	Ryan Sieg	RSS Racing	Chevrolet
41	Sam Mayer (CC)	Haas Factory Team	Chevrolet
42	Brad Perez	Young's Motorsports	Chevrolet
44	Brennan Poole	Alpha Prime Racing	Ford
45	Lavar Scott (R)	Alpha Prime Racing	Ford
47	Dawson Cram	Mike Harmon Racing	Chevrolet
48	Patrick Staropoli (R)	Big Machine Racing	Chevrolet
51	Jeremy Clements	Jeremy Clements Racing	Chevrolet
53	Austin J. Hill	Joey Gase Motorsports	Chevrolet
54	Taylor Gray (CC)	Joe Gibbs Racing	Toyota
55	Joey Gase	Joey Gase Motorsports	Ford
87	Nick Sanchez	Peterson Racing	Chevrolet
88	Rajah Caruth (CC)	JR Motorsports	Chevrolet
91	Mason Maggio	DGM Racing	Chevrolet
92	Josh Williams	DGM Racing	Chevrolet
96	Anthony Alfredo	Viking Motorsports	Chevrolet
99	Parker Retzlaff (CC)	Viking Motorsports	Chevrolet
Official entry list

== Practice ==
The first and only practice session was held on Saturday, September 12, at 1:00 PM EST, and lasted for 50 minutes.

Taylor Gray, driving for Joe Gibbs Racing, set the fastest time in the session, with a lap of 33.958 seconds, and a speed of 132.517 miles per hour (213.265 km/h).

=== Practice results ===
Pos.	#	Driver	Team	Make	Time	Speed
1	54	Taylor Gray (CC)	Joe Gibbs Racing	Toyota	33.958	132.517
2	51	Jeremy Clements	Jeremy Clements Racing	Chevrolet	33.960	132.509
3	18	William Sawalich	Joe Gibbs Racing	Toyota	33.991	132.388
Full practice results

== Qualifying ==
Qualifying was held on Saturday, September 12, at 2:05 PM. Since World Wide Technology Raceway is an intermediate oval, the qualifying procedure used was a single-car, one-lap system with one round. Drivers were be on track by themselves and had one lap to post a qualifying time, and whoever set the fastest time won the pole.

Carson Kvapil, driving for JR Motorsports, qualified on pole position with a lap of 33.626 seconds, and a speed of 133.825 miles per hour (215.370 km/h).

No drivers failed to qualify.

=== Qualifying results ===
Pos.	#	Driver	Team	Make	Time	Speed
1	1	Carson Kvapil (CC)	JR Motorsports	Chevrolet	33.626	133.825
2	2	Jesse Love (CC)	Richard Childress Racing	Chevrolet	33.730	133.412
3	00	Sheldon Creed (CC)	Haas Factory Team	Chevrolet	33.738	133.381
4	17	Corey Day (CC)	Hendrick Motorsports	Chevrolet	33.738	133.381
5	7	Justin Allgaier (CC)	JR Motorsports	Chevrolet	33.788	133.183
6	21	Austin Hill (CC)	Richard Childress Racing	Chevrolet	33.802	133.128
7	24	Harrison Burton	Sam Hunt Racing	Toyota	33.805	133.116
8	18	William Sawalich	Joe Gibbs Racing	Toyota	33.812	133.089
9	88	Rajah Caruth (CC)	JR Motorsports	Chevrolet	33.847	132.951
10	19	Brent Crews (OC) (R)	Joe Gibbs Racing	Toyota	33.854	132.924
11	54	Taylor Gray (CC)	Joe Gibbs Racing	Toyota	33.889	132.786
12	8	Sammy Smith (CC)	JR Motorsports	Chevrolet	33.896	132.759
13	96	Anthony Alfredo	Viking Motorsports	Chevrolet	33.930	132.626
14	87	Nick Sanchez	Peterson Racing	Chevrolet	33.967	132.482
15	20	Brandon Jones (CC)	Joe Gibbs Racing	Toyota	34.034	132.221
16	28	Kyle Sieg	RSS Racing	Chevrolet	34.047	132.170
17	26	Dean Thompson	Sam Hunt Racing	Toyota	34.111	131.922
18	41	Sam Mayer (CC)	Haas Factory Team	Chevrolet	34.113	131.915
19	99	Parker Retzlaff (CC)	Viking Motorsports	Chevrolet	34.122	131.880
20	27	Jeb Burton	Jordan Anderson Racing	Chevrolet	34.200	131.579
21	48	Patrick Staropoli (R)	Big Machine Racing	Chevrolet	34.248	131.395
22	44	Brennan Poole	Alpha Prime Racing	Ford	34.297	131.207
23	51	Jeremy Clements	Jeremy Clements Racing	Chevrolet	34.384	130.875
24	31	Blaine Perkins	Jordan Anderson Racing	Chevrolet	34.399	130.818
25	0	Myatt Snider	SS-Green Light Racing	Chevrolet	34.482	130.503
26	07	Josh Bilicki	SS-Green Light Racing	Chevrolet	34.524	130.344
27	45	Lavar Scott (R)	Alpha Prime Racing	Ford	34.571	130.167
28	39	Ryan Sieg	RSS Racing	Chevrolet	34.626	129.960
29	42	Brad Perez	Young's Motorsports	Chevrolet	34.702	129.676
30	92	Josh Williams	DGM Racing	Chevrolet	34.733	129.560
31	32	Jordan Anderson	Jordan Anderson Racing	Chevrolet	34.743	129.522
32	91	Mason Maggio	DGM Racing	Chevrolet	34.759	129.463
Qualified by owner's points
33	02	Ryan Ellis	Young's Motorsports	Chevrolet	34.768	129.429
34	55	Joey Gase	Joey Gase Motorsports	Ford	34.977	128.656
35	53	Austin J. Hill	Joey Gase Motorsports	Chevrolet	35.279	127.555
36	47	Dawson Cram	Mike Harmon Racing	Chevrolet	—	—
Official qualifying results
Official starting lineup

== Race ==
=== Race results ===
==== Stage Results ====
Stage One Laps: 45

Pos.	#	Driver	Team	Make	Pts
1	1	Carson Kvapil (CC)	JR Motorsports	Chevrolet	10
2	17	Corey Day (CC)	Hendrick Motorsports	Chevrolet	9
3	7	Justin Allgaier (CC)	JR Motorsports	Chevrolet	8
4	21	Austin Hill (CC)	Richard Childress Racing	Chevrolet	7
5	2	Jesse Love (CC)	Richard Childress Racing	Chevrolet	6
6	00	Sheldon Creed (CC)	Haas Factory Team	Chevrolet	5
7	19	Brent Crews (OC) (R)	Joe Gibbs Racing	Toyota	4
8	18	William Sawalich	Joe Gibbs Racing	Toyota	3
9	41	Sam Mayer (CC)	Haas Factory Team	Chevrolet	2
10	99	Parker Retzlaff (CC)	Viking Motorsports	Chevrolet	1

Stage Two Laps: 45

Pos.	#	Driver	Team	Make	Pts
1	2	Jesse Love (CC)	Richard Childress Racing	Chevrolet	10
2	41	Sam Mayer (CC)	Haas Factory Team	Chevrolet	9
3	1	Carson Kvapil (CC)	JR Motorsports	Chevrolet	8
4	00	Sheldon Creed (CC)	Haas Factory Team	Chevrolet	7
5	18	William Sawalich	Joe Gibbs Racing	Toyota	6
6	7	Justin Allgaier (CC)	JR Motorsports	Chevrolet	5
7	17	Corey Day (CC)	Hendrick Motorsports	Chevrolet	4
8	99	Parker Retzlaff (CC)	Viking Motorsports	Chevrolet	3
9	8	Sammy Smith	JR Motorsports	Chevrolet	2
10	39	Ryan Sieg	RSS Racing	Chevrolet	1

=== Final Stage results ===
Stage Three Laps: 90

Fin	St	#	Driver	Team	Make	Laps	Led	Status	Pts
1	2	2	Jesse Love (CC)	Richard Childress Racing	Chevrolet	180	70	Running	72
2	3	00	Sheldon Creed (CC)	Haas Factory Team	Chevrolet	180	0	Running	47
3	18	41	Sam Mayer (CC)	Haas Factory Team	Chevrolet	180	0	Running	45
4	11	54	Taylor Gray (CC)	Joe Gibbs Racing	Toyota	180	0	Running	33
5	1	1	Carson Kvapil (CC)	JR Motorsports	Chevrolet	180	105	Running	50
6	19	99	Parker Retzlaff (CC)	Viking Motorsports	Chevrolet	180	0	Running	35
7	10	19	Brent Crews (OC) (R)	Joe Gibbs Racing	Toyota	180	0	Running	34
8	12	8	Sammy Smith (CC)	JR Motorsports	Chevrolet	180	0	Running	31
9	16	28	Kyle Sieg	RSS Racing	Chevrolet	180	0	Running	28
10	20	27	Jeb Burton	Jordan Anderson Racing	Chevrolet	180	0	Running	27
11	9	88	Rajah Caruth (CC)	JR Motorsports	Chevrolet	180	0	Running	26
12	17	26	Dean Thompson	Sam Hunt Racing	Toyota	180	0	Running	25
13	5	7	Justin Allgaier (CC)	JR Motorsports	Chevrolet	180	0	Running	37
14	28	39	Ryan Sieg	RSS Racing	Chevrolet	180	0	Running	24
15	15	20	Brandon Jones (CC)	Joe Gibbs Racing	Toyota	180	0	Running	22
16	8	18	William Sawalich	Joe Gibbs Racing	Toyota	180	0	Running	30
17	21	48	Patrick Staropoli (R)	Big Machine Racing	Chevrolet	180	0	Running	20
18	30	92	Josh Williams	DGM Racing	Chevrolet	180	0	Running	19
19	22	44	Brennan Poole	Alpha Prime Racing	Ford	180	0	Running	18
20	24	31	Blaine Perkins	Jordan Anderson Racing	Chevrolet	180	0	Running	17
21	32	91	Mason Maggio	DGM Racing	Chevrolet	180	0	Running	16
22	13	96	Anthony Alfredo	Viking Motorsports	Chevrolet	180	0	Running	15
23	31	32	Jordan Anderson	Jordan Anderson Racing	Chevrolet	180	0	Running	14
24	33	02	Ryan Ellis	Young's Motorsports	Chevrolet	180	0	Running	13
25	25	0	Myatt Snider	SS-Green Light Racing	Chevrolet	180	0	Running	12
26	26	07	Josh Bilicki	SS-Green Light Racing	Chevrolet	180	0	Running	11
27	34	55	Joey Gase	Joey Gase Motorsports	Ford	180	0	Running	10
28	29	42	Brad Perez	Young's Motorsports	Chevrolet	179	0	Running	9
29	6	21	Austin Hill (CC)	Richard Childress Racing	Chevrolet	179	4	Running	15
30	27	45	Lavar Scott (R)	Alpha Prime Racing	Ford	179	0	Running	7
31	23	51	Jeremy Clements	Jeremy Clements Racing	Chevrolet	168	0	Running	6
32	35	53	Austin J. Hill	Joey Gase Motorsports	Chevrolet	153	1	Electrical	5
33	4	17	Corey Day (CC)	Hendrick Motorsports	Chevrolet	133	0	Accident	17
34	14	87	Nick Sanchez	Peterson Racing	Chevrolet	48	0	Accident	3
35	7	24	Harrison Burton	Sam Hunt Racing	Toyota	48	0	Accident	2
36	36	47	Dawson Cram	Mike Harmon Racing	Chevrolet	0	0	Engine	1
Official race results

=== Race statistics ===
- Lead changes: 8 among 4 different drivers
- Cautions/Laps: 7 for 37 laps
- Red flags: 1
- Time of race: 2 hours, 25 minutes and 13 seconds
- Average speed: 92.965 miles per hour (149.613 km/h)

== Standings after the race ==
Drivers' Championship standings

	Pos	Driver	Points
1	1	Sheldon Creed	2,175
1	2	Justin Allgaier	2,172 (–3)
	3	Carson Kvapil	2,166 (–9)
2	4	Jesse Love	2,159 (–16)
3	5	Sam Mayer	2,114 (–61)
2	6	Austin Hill	2,114 (–61)
	7	Sammy Smith	2,111 (–64)
3	8	Corey Day	2,106 (–69)
1	9	Brandon Jones	2,099 (–76)
	10	Parker Retzlaff	2,092 (–83)
	11	Taylor Gray	2,089 (–86)
	12	Rajah Caruth	2,057 (–118)
Official driver's standings

Manufacturers' Championship standings

Pos	Manufacturer	Points
1	Chevrolet	1,369
2	Toyota	896 (–473)
3	Ford	234 (–1,135)

- Note: Only the first 12 positions are included for the driver standings.

Previous race: 2026 Fleetio 200	NASCAR O'Reilly Auto Parts Series; 2026 season	Next race: 2026 Food City 300
