= 2026 Food City 300 =

NASCAR O'Reilly Auto Parts Series race at Bristol Motor Speedway

Race details
- Race 27 of 33 in the 2026 NASCAR O'Reilly Auto Parts Series
- Date: September 18, 2026
- Location: Bristol Motor Speedway in Bristol, Tennessee
- Course: Permanent racing facility
- Course length: 0.533 miles (0.858 km)
- Distance: 305 laps, 162.565 mi (261.623 km)
- Scheduled distance: 300 laps, 159.9 mi (257.334 km)
- Average speed: 86.229 miles per hour (138.772 km/h)

Pole position
Driver	Jesse Love	Richard Childress Racing
- Grid positions set by competition-based formula

Most laps led
Driver	Carson Kvapil	JR Motorsports
- Laps: 156

Fastest lap
Driver	Taylor Gray	Joe Gibbs Racing
- Time: 15.851

Winner
No. 00	Sheldon Creed	Haas Factory Team

Television in the United States
- Network: The CW
- Announcers: Adam Alexander, Jamie McMurray, and Parker Kligerman

Radio in the United States
- Radio: PRN
- Booth announcers: Brad Gillie and Nick Yeoman
- Turn announcers: Pat Patterson (Backstretch)

The 2026 Food City 300 was a NASCAR O'Reilly Auto Parts Series race held on Friday, September 18, 2026, at Bristol Motor Speedway in Bristol, Tennessee. Contested over 300 laps on the 0.533-mile (0.858 km) concrete oval, it was the 27th race of the 2026 NASCAR O'Reilly Auto Parts Series season, the third race in the NASCAR Chase, and the 45th running of the event.

In a wild finish, Sheldon Creed, driving for Haas Factory Team, took advantage of fresher tires, and surged past William Sawalich for the lead on the final restart, leading the final three laps to earn his third career NASCAR O'Reilly Auto Parts Series win and his third of the season. Justin Allgaier won the first stage, leading 49 laps, while Carson Kvapil won the second stage, leading the race-high 156 laps. At race's end, Sawalich finished second, and Brent Crews finished third. Allgaier and Corey Day rounded out the top five, while Taylor Gray, Sam Mayer, Parker Retzlaff, Dean Thompson, and Sammy Smith rounded out the top ten.

== Report ==
=== Background ===
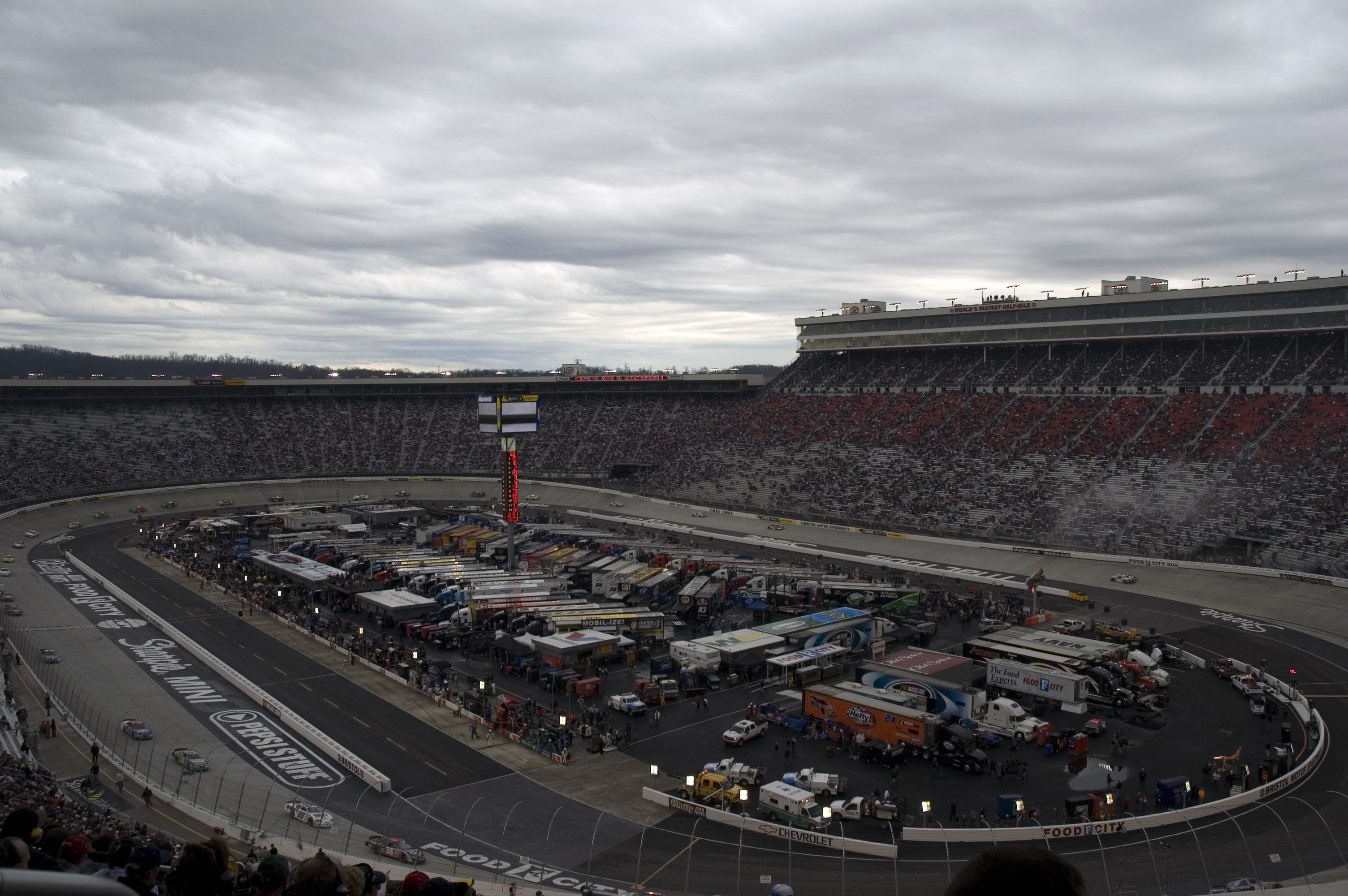
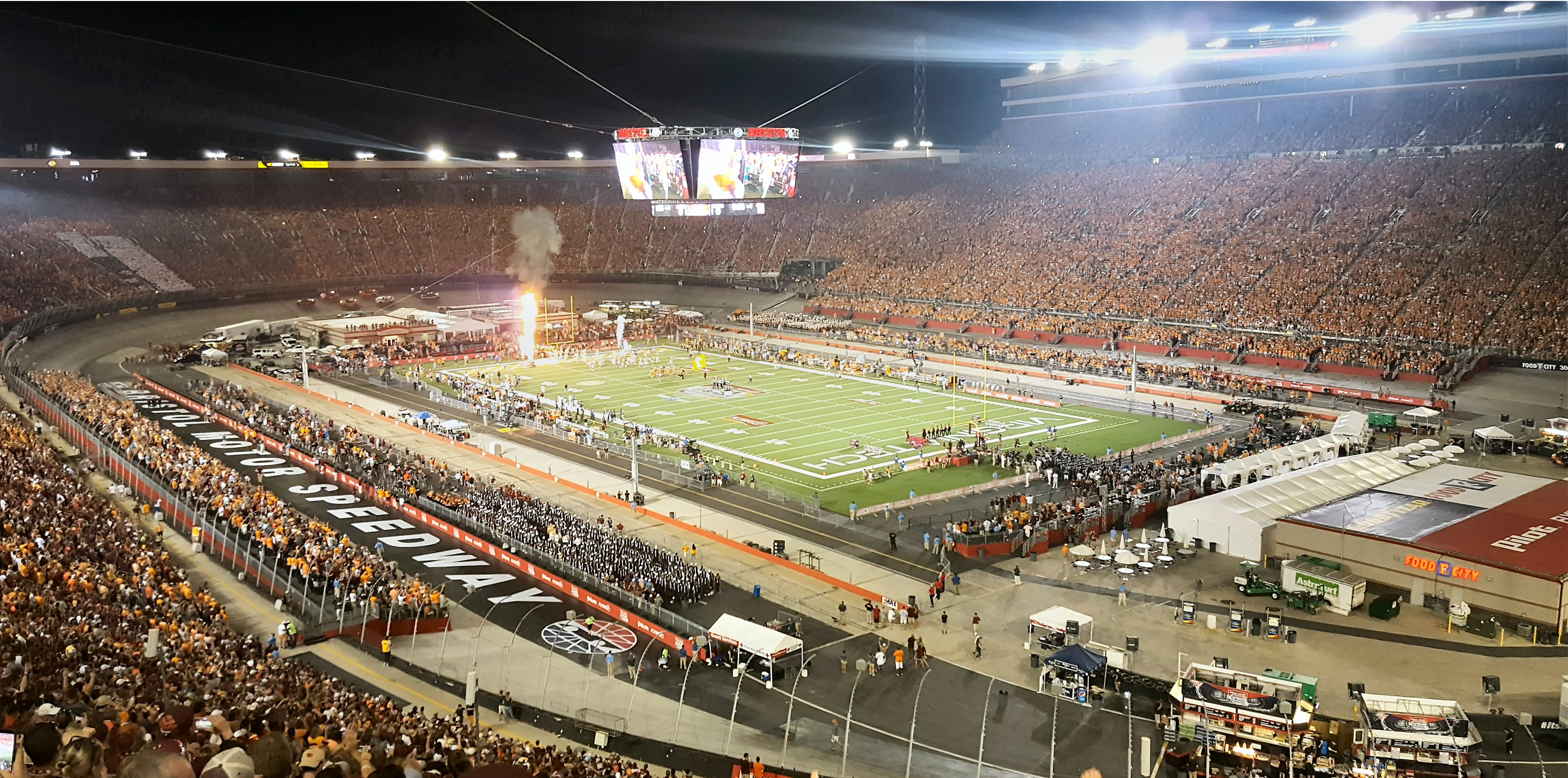
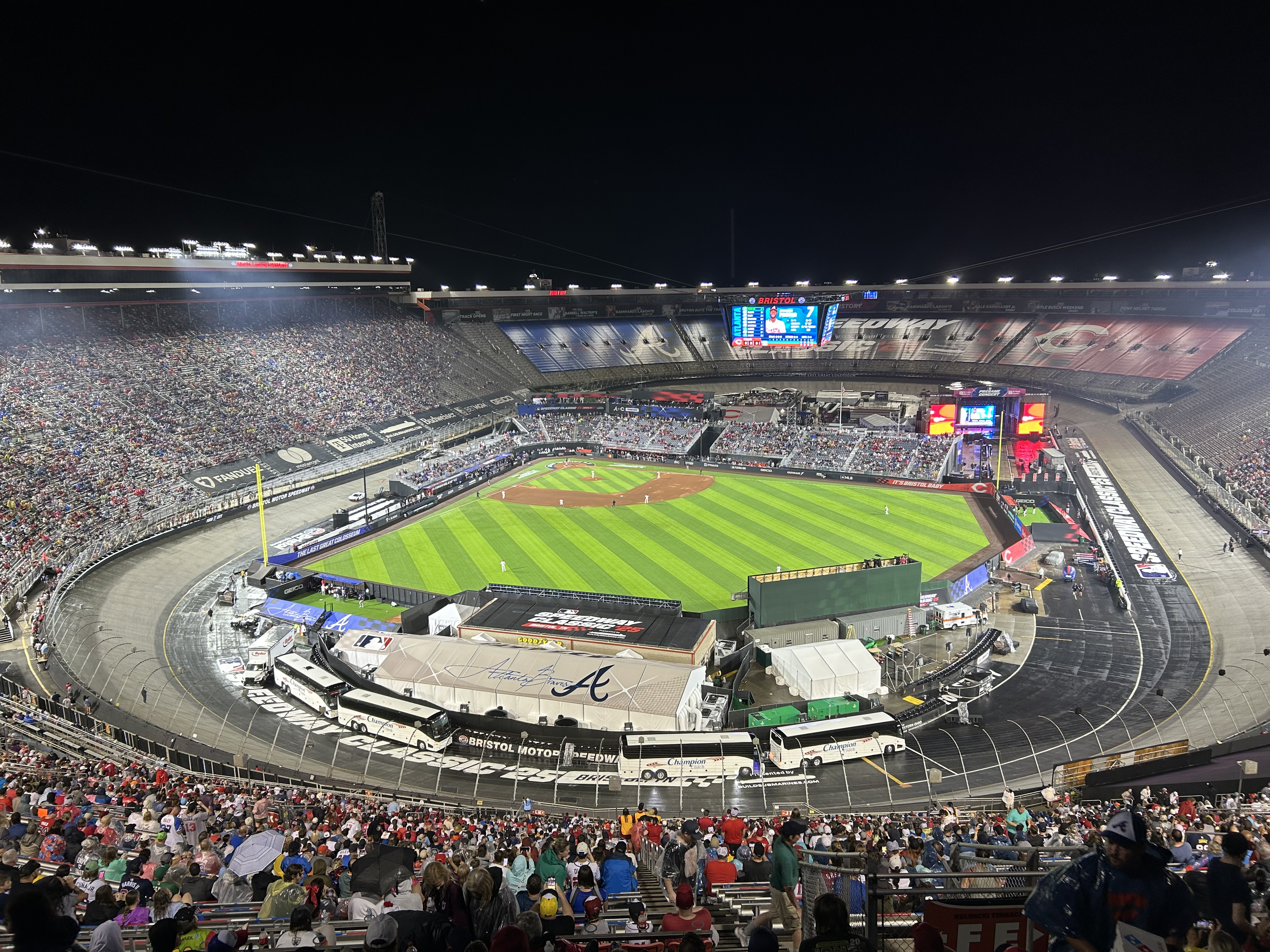
The Track (left) the Battle at Bristol (center) and the MLB Speedway Classic (right), are all events previously held at Bristol Motor Speedway.

The Bristol Motor Speedway, formerly known as Bristol International Raceway and Bristol Raceway, is a NASCAR short track venue located in Bristol, Tennessee. Constructed in 1960, it held its first NASCAR race on July 30, 1961. Despite its short length, Bristol is among the most popular tracks on the NASCAR schedule because of its distinct features, which include extraordinarily steep banking, an all-concrete surface, two pit roads, and stadium-like seating. It has also been named one of the loudest NASCAR tracks.

Besides holding racing events, the track has hosted the Battle at Bristol, a college football game between the Tennessee Volunteers and the Virginia Tech Hokies on September 10, 2016, and the MLB Speedway Classic, an MLB baseball game between the Atlanta Braves and the Cincinnati Reds from August 2-3, 2025.

==== Entry list ====
- (R) denotes rookie driver.
- (i) denotes driver who is ineligible for series driver points.
- (CC) denotes chase contender.
- (OC) denotes owners' chase contender car.

#	Driver	Team	Make
00	Sheldon Creed (CC)	Haas Factory Team	Chevrolet
0	Garrett Smithley	SS-Green Light Racing	Chevrolet
1	Carson Kvapil (CC)	JR Motorsports	Chevrolet
02	Ryan Ellis	Young's Motorsports	Chevrolet
2	Jesse Love (CC)	Richard Childress Racing	Chevrolet
07	Josh Bilicki	SS-Green Light Racing	Chevrolet
7	Justin Allgaier (CC)	JR Motorsports	Chevrolet
8	Sammy Smith (CC)	JR Motorsports	Chevrolet
9	Jake Finch	JR Motorsports	Chevrolet
17	Corey Day (CC)	Hendrick Motorsports	Chevrolet
18	William Sawalich	Joe Gibbs Racing	Toyota
19	Brent Crews (OC) (R)	Joe Gibbs Racing	Toyota
20	Brandon Jones (CC)	Joe Gibbs Racing	Toyota
21	Austin Hill (CC)	Richard Childress Racing	Chevrolet
24	Harrison Burton	Sam Hunt Racing	Toyota
26	Dean Thompson	Sam Hunt Racing	Toyota
27	Jeb Burton	Jordan Anderson Racing	Chevrolet
28	Kyle Sieg	RSS Racing	Chevrolet
31	Blaine Perkins	Jordan Anderson Racing	Chevrolet
32	Andrew Patterson	Jordan Anderson Racing	Chevrolet
38	J. J. Yeley	RSS Racing	Ford
39	Ryan Sieg	RSS Racing	Chevrolet
41	Sam Mayer (CC)	Haas Factory Team	Chevrolet
42	Logan Bearden	Young's Motorsports	Chevrolet
43	Landon S. Huffman	SPS Racing	Chevrolet
44	Brennan Poole	Alpha Prime Racing	Chevrolet
45	Lavar Scott (R)	Alpha Prime Racing	Chevrolet
47	Natalie Decker (i)	Mike Harmon Racing	Chevrolet
48	Patrick Staropoli (R)	Big Machine Racing	Chevrolet
51	Jeremy Clements	Jeremy Clements Racing	Chevrolet
53	Carson Ware	Joey Gase Motorsports	Chevrolet
54	Taylor Gray (CC)	Joe Gibbs Racing	Toyota
55	David Starr	Joey Gase Motorsports	Chevrolet
87	Nick Sanchez (i)	Peterson Racing	Chevrolet
88	Rajah Caruth (CC)	JR Motorsports	Chevrolet
91	Stefan Parsons (i)	DGM Racing	Chevrolet
92	Josh Williams	DGM Racing	Chevrolet
96	Anthony Alfredo	Viking Motorsports	Chevrolet
99	Parker Retzlaff (CC)	Viking Motorsports	Chevrolet
Official entry list

== Practice ==
The first and only practice session was held on Friday, September 18, at 2:00 PM EST, and lasted for 50 minutes.

Brandon Jones, driving for Joe Gibbs Racing, set the fastest time in the session, with a lap of 15.943 seconds, and a speed of 120.354 miles per hour (193.691 km/h).

=== Practice results ===
Pos.	#	Driver	Team	Make	Time	Speed
1	20	Brandon Jones (CC)	Joe Gibbs Racing	Toyota	15.943	120.354
2	19	Brent Crews (OC) (R)	Joe Gibbs Racing	Toyota	15.971	120.143
3	2	Jesse Love (CC)	Richard Childress Racing	Chevrolet	15.972	120.135
Full practice results

== Starting lineup ==
Qualifying was originally scheduled to be held on Friday, September 18, at 3:05 PM EST, but was cancelled due to inclement weather. Jesse Love, driving for Richard Childress Racing, was awarded the pole position as a result of NASCAR's pandemic formula with a score of 1.900.

Landon S. Huffman was the only driver who failed to qualify.

=== Starting lineup ===
Pos.	#	Driver	Team	Make
1	2	Jesse Love (CC)	Richard Childress Racing	Chevrolet
2	00	Sheldon Creed (CC)	Haas Factory Team	Chevrolet
3	41	Sam Mayer (CC)	Haas Factory Team	Chevrolet
4	1	Carson Kvapil (CC)	JR Motorsports	Chevrolet
5	54	Taylor Gray (CC)	Joe Gibbs Racing	Toyota
6	19	Brent Crews (OC) (R)	Joe Gibbs Racing	Toyota
7	99	Parker Retzlaff (CC)	Viking Motorsports	Chevrolet
8	8	Sammy Smith (CC)	JR Motorsports	Chevrolet
9	7	Justin Allgaier (CC)	JR Motorsports	Chevrolet
10	88	Rajah Caruth (CC)	JR Motorsports	Chevrolet
11	20	Brandon Jones (CC)	Joe Gibbs Racing	Toyota
12	26	Dean Thompson	Sam Hunt Racing	Toyota
13	27	Jeb Burton	Jordan Anderson Racing	Chevrolet
14	39	Ryan Sieg	RSS Racing	Chevrolet
15	28	Kyle Sieg	RSS Racing	Chevrolet
16	18	William Sawalich	Joe Gibbs Racing	Toyota
17	44	Brennan Poole	Alpha Prime Racing	Chevrolet
18	48	Patrick Staropoli (R)	Big Machine Racing	Chevrolet
19	96	Anthony Alfredo	Viking Motorsports	Chevrolet
20	21	Austin Hill (CC)	Richard Childress Racing	Chevrolet
21	31	Blaine Perkins	Jordan Anderson Racing	Chevrolet
22	92	Josh Williams	DGM Racing	Chevrolet
23	32	Andrew Patterson	Jordan Anderson Racing	Chevrolet
24	91	Stefan Parsons (i)	DGM Racing	Chevrolet
25	0	Garrett Smithley	SS-Green Light Racing	Chevrolet
26	17	Corey Day (CC)	Hendrick Motorsports	Chevrolet
27	02	Ryan Ellis	Young's Motorsports	Chevrolet
28	07	Josh Bilicki	SS-Green Light Racing	Chevrolet
29	51	Jeremy Clements	Jeremy Clements Racing	Chevrolet
30	55	David Starr	Joey Gase Motorsports	Chevrolet
31	42	Logan Bearden	Young's Motorsports	Chevrolet
32	45	Lavar Scott (R)	Alpha Prime Racing	Chevrolet
Qualified by owner's points
33	87	Nick Sanchez (i)	Peterson Racing	Chevrolet
34	24	Harrison Burton	Sam Hunt Racing	Toyota
35	53	Carson Ware	Joey Gase Motorsports	Chevrolet
36	9	Jake Finch	JR Motorsports	Chevrolet
37	47	Natalie Decker (i)	Mike Harmon Racing	Chevrolet
38	38	J. J. Yeley	RSS Racing	Ford
Failed to qualify
39	43	Landon S. Huffman	SPS Racing	Chevrolet
Official starting lineup

== Race ==
=== Race results ===
==== Stage Results ====
Stage One Laps: 85

Pos.	#	Driver	Team	Make	Pts
1	7	Justin Allgaier (CC)	JR Motorsports	Chevrolet	10
2	1	Carson Kvapil (CC)	JR Motorsports	Chevrolet	9
3	19	Brent Crews (OC) (R)	Joe Gibbs Racing	Toyota	8
4	2	Jesse Love (CC)	Richard Childress Racing	Chevrolet	7
5	41	Sam Mayer (CC)	Haas Factory Team	Chevrolet	6
6	8	Sammy Smith (CC)	JR Motorsports	Chevrolet	5
7	54	Taylor Gray (CC)	Joe Gibbs Racing	Toyota	4
8	00	Sheldon Creed (CC)	Haas Factory Team	Chevrolet	3
9	99	Parker Retzlaff (CC)	Viking Motorsports	Chevrolet	2
10	17	Corey Day (CC)	Hendrick Motorsports	Chevrolet	1

Stage Two Laps: 85

Pos.	#	Driver	Team	Make	Pts
1	1	Carson Kvapil (CC)	JR Motorsports	Chevrolet	10
2	7	Justin Allgaier (CC)	JR Motorsports	Chevrolet	9
3	2	Jesse Love (CC)	Richard Childress Racing	Chevrolet	8
4	41	Sam Mayer (CC)	Haas Factory Team	Chevrolet	7
5	54	Taylor Gray (CC)	Joe Gibbs Racing	Toyota	6
6	19	Brent Crews (OC) (R)	Joe Gibbs Racing	Toyota	5
7	17	Corey Day (CC)	Hendrick Motorsports	Chevrolet	4
8	18	William Sawalich	Joe Gibbs Racing	Toyota	3
9	00	Sheldon Creed (CC)	Haas Factory Team	Chevrolet	2
10	99	Parker Retzlaff (CC)	Viking Motorsports	Chevrolet	1

=== Final Stage Results ===
Stage Three Laps: 135

Fin	St	#	Driver	Team	Make	Laps	Led	Status	Pts
1	2	00	Sheldon Creed (CC)	Haas Factory Team	Chevrolet	305	3	Running	60
2	16	18	William Sawalich	Joe Gibbs Racing	Toyota	305	13	Running	38
3	6	19	Brent Crews (OC) (R)	Joe Gibbs Racing	Toyota	305	0	Running	47
4	9	7	Justin Allgaier (CC)	JR Motorsports	Chevrolet	305	49	Running	52
5	26	17	Corey Day (CC)	Hendrick Motorsports	Chevrolet	305	0	Running	37
6	5	54	Taylor Gray (CC)	Joe Gibbs Racing	Toyota	305	0	Running	42
7	3	41	Sam Mayer (CC)	Haas Factory Team	Chevrolet	305	0	Running	43
8	7	99	Parker Retzlaff (CC)	Viking Motorsports	Chevrolet	305	0	Running	32
9	12	26	Dean Thompson	Sam Hunt Racing	Toyota	305	0	Running	28
10	8	8	Sammy Smith (CC)	JR Motorsports	Chevrolet	305	0	Running	32
11	36	9	Jake Finch	JR Motorsports	Chevrolet	305	0	Running	26
12	34	24	Harrison Burton	Sam Hunt Racing	Toyota	305	0	Running	25
13	17	44	Brennan Poole	Alpha Prime Racing	Chevrolet	305	0	Running	24
14	29	51	Jeremy Clements	Jeremy Clements Racing	Chevrolet	305	0	Running	23
15	11	20	Brandon Jones (CC)	Joe Gibbs Racing	Toyota	305	0	Running	22
16	33	87	Nick Sanchez (i)	Peterson Racing	Chevrolet	305	0	Running	0
17	1	2	Jesse Love (CC)	Richard Childress Racing	Chevrolet	305	84	Running	35
18	31	42	Logan Bearden	Young's Motorsports	Chevrolet	304	0	Running	19
19	23	32	Andrew Patterson	Jordan Anderson Racing	Chevrolet	303	0	Running	18
20	15	28	Kyle Sieg	RSS Racing	Chevrolet	303	0	Running	17
21	24	91	Stefan Parsons (i)	DGM Racing	Chevrolet	302	0	Running	0
22	20	21	Austin Hill (CC)	Richard Childress Racing	Chevrolet	301	0	Running	15
23	10	88	Rajah Caruth (CC)	JR Motorsports	Chevrolet	301	0	Running	14
24	4	1	Carson Kvapil (CC)	JR Motorsports	Chevrolet	301	156	Running	32
25	13	27	Jeb Burton	Jordan Anderson Racing	Chevrolet	301	0	Running	12
26	18	48	Patrick Staropoli (R)	Big Machine Racing	Chevrolet	299	0	Running	11
27	27	02	Ryan Ellis	Young's Motorsports	Chevrolet	299	0	Running	10
28	22	92	Josh Williams	DGM Racing	Chevrolet	299	0	Running	9
29	35	53	Carson Ware	Joey Gase Motorsports	Chevrolet	298	0	Running	8
30	14	39	Ryan Sieg	RSS Racing	Chevrolet	297	0	Accident	7
31	28	07	Josh Bilicki	SS-Green Light Racing	Chevrolet	297	0	Running	6
32	19	96	Anthony Alfredo	Viking Motorsports	Chevrolet	290	0	Running	5
33	25	0	Garrett Smithley	SS-Green Light Racing	Chevrolet	258	0	Engine	4
34	21	31	Blaine Perkins	Jordan Anderson Racing	Chevrolet	230	0	Running	3
35	30	55	David Starr	Joey Gase Motorsports	Chevrolet	206	0	Suspension	2
36	32	45	Lavar Scott (R)	Alpha Prime Racing	Chevrolet	138	0	Oil Cooler	1
37	37	47	Natalie Decker (i)	Mike Harmon Racing	Chevrolet	119	0	Transmission	0
38	38	38	J. J. Yeley	RSS Racing	Ford	108	0	Fuel Pump	1
Official race results

=== Race statistics ===
- Lead changes: 8 among 5 different drivers
- Cautions/Laps: 5 for 47 laps
- Red flags: 0
- Time of race: 1 hour, 53 minutes and 7 seconds
- Average speed: 86.229 miles per hour (138.772 km/h)

== Standings after the race ==
Drivers' Championship standings

	Pos	Driver	Points
	1	Sheldon Creed	2,235
	2	Justin Allgaier	2,224 (–11)
	3	Carson Kvapil	2,198 (–37)
	4	Jesse Love	2,194 (–41)
	5	Sam Mayer	2,157 (–78)
2	6	Corey Day	2,143 (–92)
	7	Sammy Smith	2,143 (–92)
3	8	Taylor Gray	2,131 (–104)
3	9	Austin Hill	2,129 (–106)
	10	Parker Retzlaff	2,124 (–111)
2	11	Brandon Jones	2,121 (–114)
	12	Rajah Caruth	2,071 (–164)
Official driver's standings

Manufacturers' Championship standings

Pos	Manufacturer	Points
1	Chevrolet	1,424
2	Toyota	931 (–493)
3	Ford	234 (–1,189)

- Note: Only the first 12 positions are included for the driver standings.

Previous race: 2026 Nu Way 225	NASCAR O'Reilly Auto Parts Series; 2026 season	Next race: 2026 Focused Health 302
