= 2026 Fleetio 200 =

NASCAR O'Reilly Auto Parts Series race at Darlington Raceway

Race details
- Race 25 of 33 in the 2026 NASCAR O'Reilly Auto Parts Series
- Date: September 5, 2026
- Location: Darlington Raceway in Darlington, South Carolina
- Course: Permanent racing facility
- Course length: 1.366 miles (2.198 km)
- Distance: 147 laps, 200.802 mi (323.159 km)
- Average speed: 102.045 miles per hour (164.226 km/h)

Pole position
Driver	Carson Kvapil	JR Motorsports
- Time: 30.424

Most laps led
Driver	Justin Allgaier	JR Motorsports
- Laps: 60

Fastest lap
Driver	Carson Kvapil	JR Motorsports
- Time: 30.632

Winner
No. 00	Sheldon Creed	Haas Factory Team

Television in the United States
- Network: The CW
- Announcers: Adam Alexander, Jamie McMurray, and Parker Kligerman

Radio in the United States
- Radio: MRN
- Booth announcers: Alex Hayden, Mike Bagley, and Todd Gordon
- Turn announcers: Dave Moody (1 & 2) and Tim Catalfamo (3 & 4)

The 2026 Fleetio 200 was a NASCAR O'Reilly Auto Parts Series race held on Saturday, September 5, 2026, at Darlington Raceway in Darlington, South Carolina. Contested over 147 laps on the 1.366-mile (2.198 km) egg-shaped asphalt oval, it was the 25th race of the 2026 NASCAR O'Reilly Auto Parts Series season, the first race in the NASCAR Chase, and the 43rd running of the event.

Sheldon Creed, driving for Haas Factory Team, took the lead from Corey Day after a late caution, and led the final 53 laps to earn his second career NASCAR O'Reilly Auto Parts Series win, and his second of the season. Justin Allgaier won the first stage, leading a race-high 60 laps, while Anthony Alfredo won the second stage, leading nine laps. At race's end, Day finished second, and Brent Crews finished third. Sammy Smith and Austin Hill rounded out the top five, while Alfredo, Taylor Gray, Sam Mayer, Jeremy Clements, and Brandon Jones rounded out the top ten.

== Report ==
=== Background ===
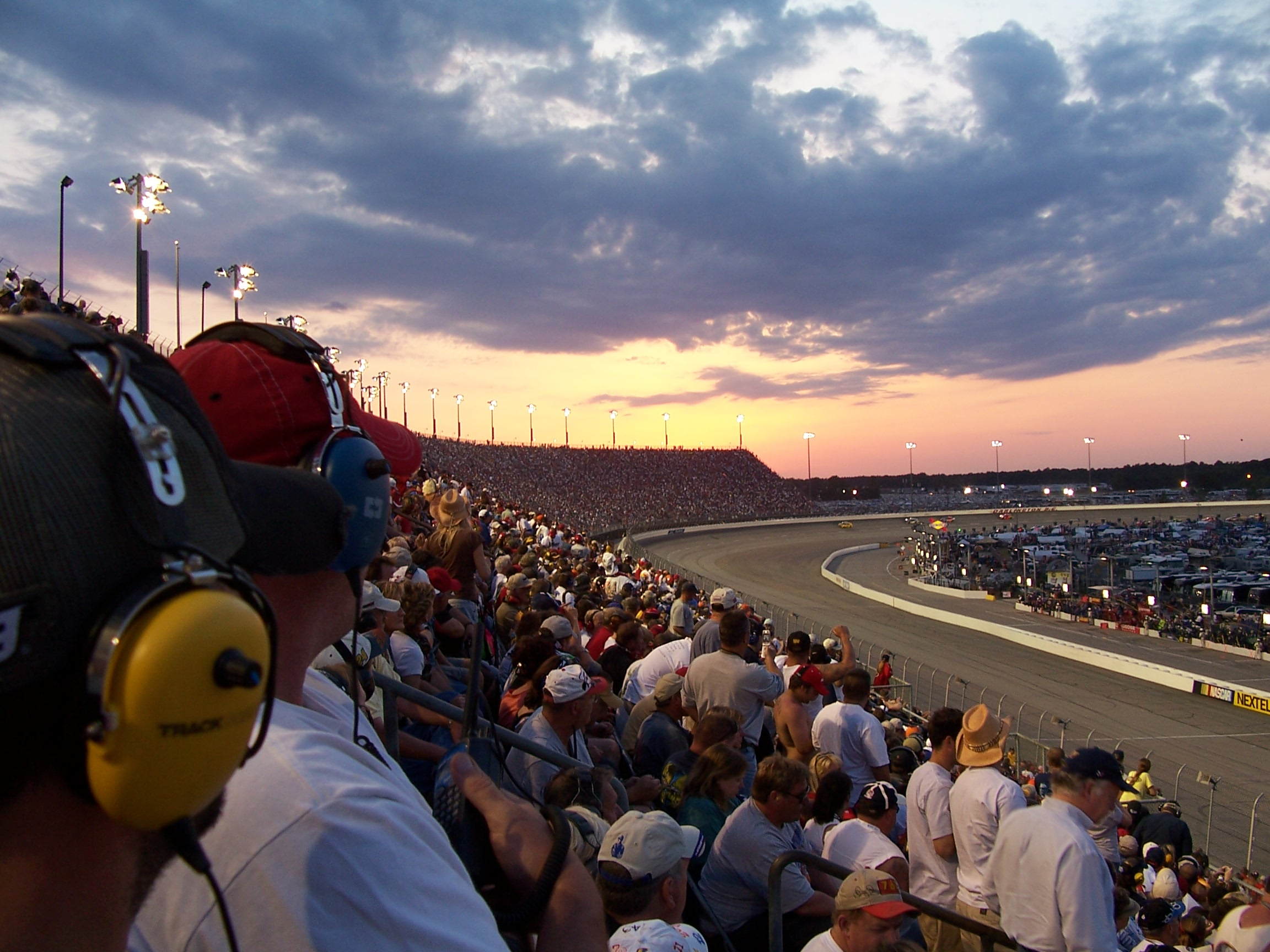
Darlington Raceway, the track where the race was held.

Darlington Raceway is a race track built for NASCAR racing located near Darlington, South Carolina. It is nicknamed "The Lady in Black" and "The Track Too Tough to Tame" by many NASCAR fans and drivers and advertised as "A NASCAR Tradition." It is of a unique, somewhat egg-shaped design, an oval with the ends of very different configurations, a condition which supposedly arose from the proximity of one end of the track to a minnow pond the owner refused to relocate. This situation makes it very challenging for the crews to set up their cars' handling in a way that is effective at both ends.

On July 23, 2026, Fleetio, a business automotive fleet maintenance and optimisation platform, was named the title sponsor of the race.

=== Surface issues ===
Darlington Raceway was last repaved following the May 2007 meeting (from 2005 to 2019, there was only one meeting; the second meeting was reinstated in 2020), and from 2008 to 2019, there was one night race. In 2020, a day race returned to the schedule, and instead of two races (one Xfinity and one Cup) during the entire year, the track hosted six races (three Cup, two Xfinity, and one Truck). The circuit kept repairing the circuit with patches during each summer before the annual Cup race in September. The circuit's narrow Turn 2 rapidly deteriorated with cracks in the tarmac allowing water to seep in the circuit. In July 2021, the circuit repaved a six hundred foot section at the entrance of Turn 2 and ending at the exit of the turn to repair the tarmac and resolve the issue for safety and to reduce the threat of weepers and surface issues in that section of the circuit.

==== Entry list ====
- (R) denotes rookie driver.
- (i) denotes driver who is ineligible for series driver points.
- (CC) denotes chase contender.
- (OC) denotes owners chase contender car.

#	Driver	Team	Make
00	Sheldon Creed (CC)	Haas Factory Team	Chevrolet
0	Garrett Smithley	SS-Green Light Racing	Chevrolet
1	Carson Kvapil (CC)	JR Motorsports	Chevrolet
02	Ryan Ellis	Young's Motorsports	Chevrolet
2	Jesse Love (CC)	Richard Childress Racing	Chevrolet
07	Josh Bilicki	SS-Green Light Racing	Chevrolet
7	Justin Allgaier (CC)	JR Motorsports	Chevrolet
8	Sammy Smith (CC)	JR Motorsports	Chevrolet
9	Jake Finch	JR Motorsports	Chevrolet
17	Corey Day (CC)	Hendrick Motorsports	Chevrolet
18	William Sawalich	Joe Gibbs Racing	Toyota
19	Brent Crews (OC) (R)	Joe Gibbs Racing	Toyota
20	Brandon Jones (CC)	Joe Gibbs Racing	Toyota
21	Austin Hill (CC)	Richard Childress Racing	Chevrolet
24	Harrison Burton	Sam Hunt Racing	Toyota
26	Dean Thompson	Sam Hunt Racing	Toyota
27	Jeb Burton	Jordan Anderson Racing	Chevrolet
28	Kyle Sieg	RSS Racing	Chevrolet
31	Blaine Perkins	Jordan Anderson Racing	Chevrolet
32	Daniel Dye (i)	Jordan Anderson Racing	Chevrolet
38	Brad Perez	RSS Racing	Ford
39	Ryan Sieg	RSS Racing	Chevrolet
41	Sam Mayer (CC)	Haas Factory Team	Chevrolet
42	Logan Bearden	Young's Motorsports	Chevrolet
44	Brennan Poole	Alpha Prime Racing	Chevrolet
45	Lavar Scott (R)	Alpha Prime Racing	Chevrolet
47	Dawson Cram	Mike Harmon Racing	Chevrolet
48	Patrick Staropoli (R)	Big Machine Racing	Chevrolet
51	Jeremy Clements	Jeremy Clements Racing	Chevrolet
53	Glen Reen	Joey Gase Motorsports	Toyota
54	Taylor Gray (CC)	Joe Gibbs Racing	Toyota
55	Joey Gase	Joey Gase Motorsports	Chevrolet
87	Nick Sanchez	Peterson Racing	Chevrolet
88	Rajah Caruth (CC)	JR Motorsports	Chevrolet
91	Mason Maggio	DGM Racing	Chevrolet
92	Preston Pardus	DGM Racing	Chevrolet
96	Anthony Alfredo	Viking Motorsports	Chevrolet
99	Parker Retzlaff (CC)	Viking Motorsports	Chevrolet
Official entry list

== Practice ==
The first and only practice session was held on Saturday, September 5, at 1:30 PM EST, and lasted for 50 minutes.

Parker Retzlaff, driving for Viking Motorsports, set the fastest time in the session, with a lap of 30.300 seconds, and a speed of 162.297 miles per hour (261.192 km/h).

=== Practice results ===
Pos.	#	Driver	Team	Make	Time	Speed
1	99	Parker Retzlaff (CC)	Viking Motorsports	Chevrolet	30.300	162.297
2	8	Sammy Smith (CC)	JR Motorsports	Chevrolet	30.569	160.869
3	96	Anthony Alfredo	Viking Motorsports	Chevrolet	30.675	160.313
Full practice results

== Qualifying ==
Qualifying was held on Saturday, September 5, at 2:35 PM EST. Since Darlington Raceway is an intermediate oval, the qualifying procedure used was a single-car, one-lap system with one round. Drivers were be on track by themselves and had one lap to post a qualifying time, and whoever set the fastest time won the pole.

Carson Kvapil, driving for JR Motorsports, qualified on pole position with a lap of 30.424 seconds, and a speed of 161.636 miles per hour (260.128 km/h).

No drivers failed to qualify.

=== Qualifying results ===
Pos.	#	Driver	Team	Make	Time	Speed
1	1	Carson Kvapil (CC)	JR Motorsports	Chevrolet	30.424	161.636
2	7	Justin Allgaier (CC)	JR Motorsports	Chevrolet	30.485	161.312
3	20	Brandon Jones (CC)	Joe Gibbs Racing	Toyota	30.619	160.606
4	2	Jesse Love (CC)	Richard Childress Racing	Chevrolet	30.622	160.590
5	41	Sam Mayer (CC)	Haas Factory Team	Chevrolet	30.626	160.569
6	21	Austin Hill (CC)	Richard Childress Racing	Chevrolet	30.745	159.948
7	54	Taylor Gray (CC)	Joe Gibbs Racing	Toyota	30.819	159.564
8	19	Brent Crews (OC) (R)	Joe Gibbs Racing	Toyota	30.849	159.409
9	88	Rajah Caruth (CC)	JR Motorsports	Chevrolet	30.855	159.378
10	99	Parker Retzlaff (CC)	Viking Motorsports	Chevrolet	30.880	159.249
11	8	Sammy Smith (CC)	JR Motorsports	Chevrolet	30.925	159.017
12	96	Anthony Alfredo	Viking Motorsports	Chevrolet	30.950	158.889
13	00	Sheldon Creed (CC)	Haas Factory Team	Chevrolet	30.974	158.765
14	17	Corey Day (CC)	Hendrick Motorsports	Chevrolet	31.015	158.556
15	51	Jeremy Clements	Jeremy Clements Racing	Chevrolet	31.016	158.550
16	24	Harrison Burton	Sam Hunt Racing	Toyota	31.112	158.061
17	26	Dean Thompson	Sam Hunt Racing	Toyota	31.126	157.990
18	39	Ryan Sieg	RSS Racing	Chevrolet	31.211	157.560
19	87	Nick Sanchez	Peterson Racing	Chevrolet	31.241	157.409
20	44	Brennan Poole	Alpha Prime Racing	Chevrolet	31.254	157.343
21	45	Lavar Scott (R)	Alpha Prime Racing	Chevrolet	31.282	157.202
22	18	William Sawalich	Joe Gibbs Racing	Toyota	31.290	157.162
23	27	Jeb Burton	Jordan Anderson Racing	Chevrolet	31.326	156.981
24	48	Patrick Staropoli (R)	Big Machine Racing	Chevrolet	31.362	156.801
25	92	Preston Pardus	DGM Racing	Chevrolet	31.497	156.129
26	32	Daniel Dye (i)	Jordan Anderson Racing	Chevrolet	31.504	156.094
27	31	Blaine Perkins	Jordan Anderson Racing	Chevrolet	31.535	155.941
28	28	Kyle Sieg	RSS Racing	Chevrolet	31.543	155.901
29	42	Logan Bearden	Young's Motorsports	Chevrolet	31.602	155.610
30	02	Ryan Ellis	Young's Motorsports	Chevrolet	31.658	155.335
31	9	Jake Finch	JR Motorsports	Chevrolet	31.790	154.690
32	91	Mason Maggio	DGM Racing	Chevrolet	31.804	154.622
Qualified by owner's points
33	07	Josh Bilicki	SS-Green Light Racing	Chevrolet	31.880	154.253
34	0	Garrett Smithley	SS-Green Light Racing	Chevrolet	31.885	154.229
35	55	Joey Gase	Joey Gase Motorsports	Chevrolet	31.946	153.935
36	38	Brad Perez	RSS Racing	Ford	32.230	152.578
37	53	Glen Reen	Joey Gase Motorsports	Toyota	32.493	151.343
38	47	Dawson Cram	Mike Harmon Racing	Chevrolet	—	—
Official qualifying results
Official starting lineup

== Race ==
=== Race results ===
==== Stage Results ====
Stage One Laps: 45

Pos.	#	Driver	Team	Make	Pts
1	7	Justin Allgaier (CC)	JR Motorsports	Chevrolet	10
2	1	Carson Kvapil (CC)	JR Motorsports	Chevrolet	9
3	21	Austin Hill (CC)	Richard Childress Racing	Chevrolet	8
4	41	Sam Mayer (CC)	Haas Factory Team	Chevrolet	7
5	99	Parker Retzlaff (CC)	Viking Motorsports	Chevrolet	6
6	96	Anthony Alfredo	Viking Motorsports	Chevrolet	5
7	51	Jeremy Clements	Jeremy Clements Racing	Chevrolet	4
8	2	Jesse Love (CC)	Richard Childress Racing	Chevrolet	3
9	87	Nick Sanchez	Peterson Racing	Chevrolet	2
10	54	Taylor Gray (CC)	Joe Gibbs Racing	Toyota	1

Stage Two Laps: 45

Pos.	#	Driver	Team	Make	Pts
1	96	Anthony Alfredo	Viking Motorsports	Chevrolet	10
2	17	Corey Day (CC)	Hendrick Motorsports	Chevrolet	9
3	00	Sheldon Creed (CC)	Haas Factory Team	Chevrolet	8
4	8	Sammy Smith (CC)	JR Motorsports	Chevrolet	7
5	1	Carson Kvapil (CC)	JR Motorsports	Chevrolet	6
6	7	Justin Allgaier (CC)	JR Motorsports	Chevrolet	5
7	21	Austin Hill (CC)	Richard Childress Racing	Chevrolet	4
8	41	Sam Mayer (CC)	Haas Factory Team	Chevrolet	3
9	28	Kyle Sieg	RSS Racing	Chevrolet	2
10	39	Ryan Sieg	RSS Racing	Chevrolet	1

=== Final Stage results ===
Stage Three Laps: 57

Fin	St	#	Driver	Team	Make	Laps	Led	Status	Pts
1	13	00	Sheldon Creed (CC)	Haas Factory Team	Chevrolet	147	53	Running	63
2	14	17	Corey Day (CC)	Hendrick Motorsports	Chevrolet	147	1	Running	44
3	8	19	Brent Crews (OC) (R)	Joe Gibbs Racing	Toyota	147	0	Running	34
4	11	8	Sammy Smith (CC)	JR Motorsports	Chevrolet	147	0	Running	40
5	6	21	Austin Hill (CC)	Richard Childress Racing	Chevrolet	147	0	Running	44
6	12	96	Anthony Alfredo	Viking Motorsports	Chevrolet	147	9	Running	46
7	7	54	Taylor Gray (CC)	Joe Gibbs Racing	Toyota	147	0	Running	31
8	5	41	Sam Mayer (CC)	Haas Factory Team	Chevrolet	147	0	Running	39
9	15	51	Jeremy Clements	Jeremy Clements Racing	Chevrolet	147	0	Running	32
10	3	20	Brandon Jones (CC)	Joe Gibbs Racing	Toyota	147	3	Running	27
11	17	26	Dean Thompson	Sam Hunt Racing	Toyota	147	0	Running	26
12	1	1	Carson Kvapil (CC)	JR Motorsports	Chevrolet	147	20	Running	41
13	4	2	Jesse Love (CC)	Richard Childress Racing	Chevrolet	147	1	Running	27
14	19	87	Nick Sanchez	Peterson Racing	Chevrolet	147	0	Running	25
15	20	44	Brennan Poole	Alpha Prime Racing	Chevrolet	147	0	Running	22
16	28	28	Kyle Sieg	RSS Racing	Chevrolet	147	0	Running	23
17	2	7	Justin Allgaier (CC)	JR Motorsports	Chevrolet	147	60	Running	35
18	31	9	Jake Finch	JR Motorsports	Chevrolet	147	0	Running	19
19	18	39	Ryan Sieg	RSS Racing	Chevrolet	147	0	Running	19
20	16	24	Harrison Burton	Sam Hunt Racing	Toyota	147	0	Running	17
21	10	99	Parker Retzlaff (CC)	Viking Motorsports	Chevrolet	147	0	Running	22
22	27	31	Blaine Perkins	Jordan Anderson Racing	Chevrolet	147	0	Running	15
23	25	92	Preston Pardus	DGM Racing	Chevrolet	147	0	Running	14
24	33	07	Josh Bilicki	SS-Green Light Racing	Chevrolet	147	0	Running	13
25	34	0	Garrett Smithley	SS-Green Light Racing	Chevrolet	147	0	Running	12
26	9	88	Rajah Caruth (CC)	JR Motorsports	Chevrolet	145	0	Running	11
27	26	32	Daniel Dye (i)	Jordan Anderson Racing	Chevrolet	145	0	Running	0
28	29	42	Logan Bearden	Young's Motorsports	Chevrolet	145	0	Running	9
29	35	55	Joey Gase	Joey Gase Motorsports	Chevrolet	119	0	Overheating	8
30	22	18	William Sawalich	Joe Gibbs Racing	Toyota	106	0	Accident	7
31	21	45	Lavar Scott (R)	Alpha Prime Racing	Chevrolet	101	0	Accident	6
32	24	48	Patrick Staropoli (R)	Big Machine Racing	Chevrolet	87	0	Engine	5
33	23	27	Jeb Burton	Jordan Anderson Racing	Chevrolet	73	0	Accident	4
34	37	53	Glen Reen	Joey Gase Motorsports	Toyota	73	0	Accident	3
35	32	91	Mason Maggio	DGM Racing	Chevrolet	69	0	Accident	2
36	38	47	Dawson Cram	Mike Harmon Racing	Chevrolet	29	0	Electrical	1
37	30	02	Ryan Ellis	Young's Motorsports	Chevrolet	23	0	Clutch	1
38	36	38	Brad Perez	RSS Racing	Ford	21	0	Brakes	1
Official race results

=== Race statistics ===
- Lead changes: 8 among 7 different drivers
- Cautions/Laps: 7 for 38 laps
- Red flags: 0
- Time of race: 1 hour, 58 minutes and 4 seconds
- Average speed: 102.045 miles per hour (164.226 km/h)

== Standings after the race ==
Drivers' Championship standings

	Pos	Driver	Points
	1	Justin Allgaier	2,135
1	2	Sheldon Creed	2,128 (–7)
1	3	Carson Kvapil	2,116 (–19)
1	4	Austin Hill	2,099 (–36)
2	5	Corey Day	2,089 (–46)
2	6	Jesse Love	2,087 (–48)
1	7	Sammy Smith	2,080 (–55)
2	8	Brandon Jones	2,077 (–58)
1	9	Sam Mayer	2,069 (–66)
1	10	Parker Retzlaff	2,057 (–78)
	11	Taylor Gray	2,056 (–79)
	12	Rajah Caruth	2,031 (–104)
Official driver's standings

Manufacturers' Championship standings

Pos	Manufacturer	Points
1	Chevrolet	1,314
2	Toyota	863 (–451)
3	Ford	216 (–1,098)

- Note: Only the first 12 positions are included for the driver standings.

Previous race: 2026 Winn-Dixie 250	NASCAR O'Reilly Auto Parts Series; 2026 season	Next race: 2026 Nu Way 225
