= Austin J. Hill =

American racing driver (born 2007)

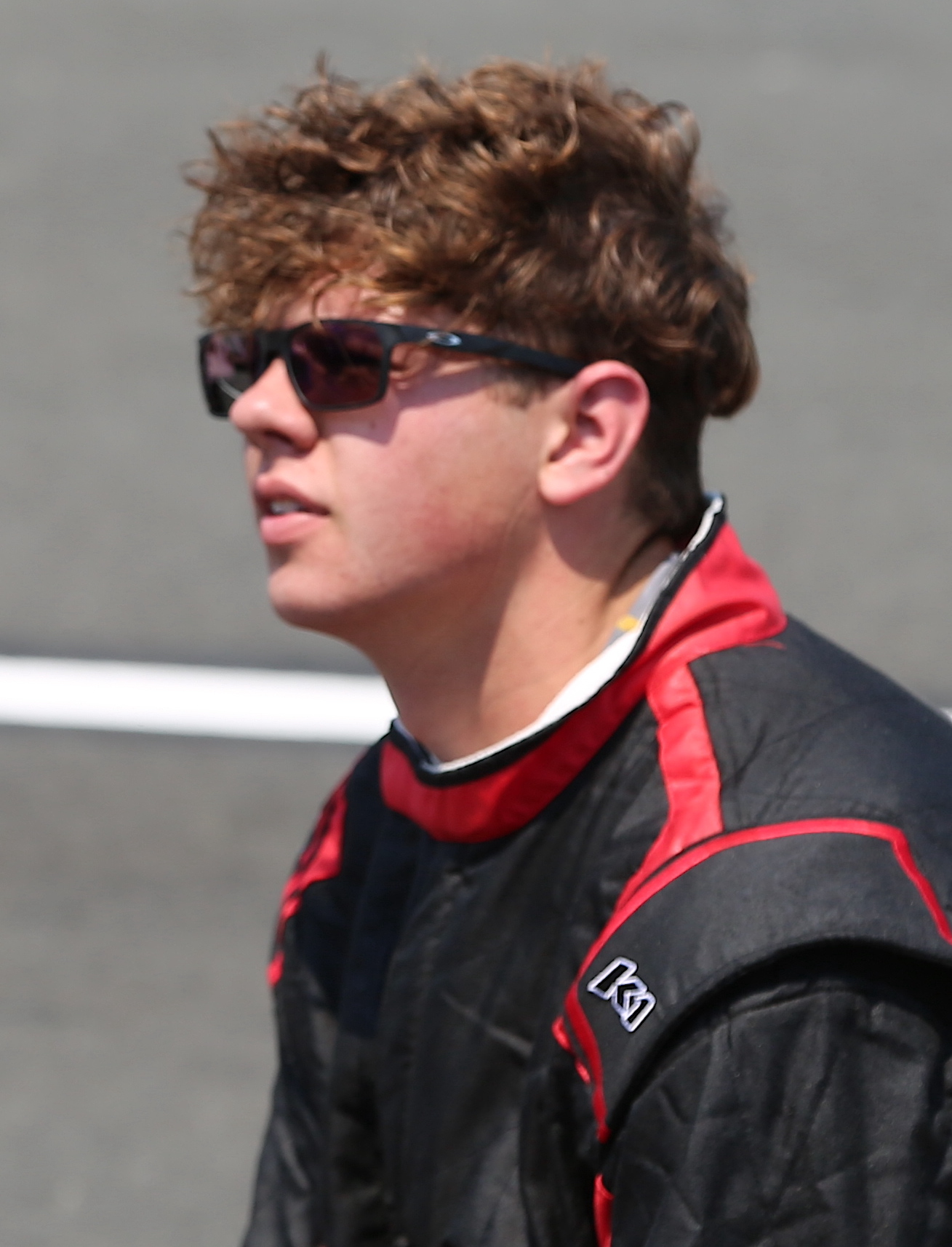
- Hill at Sonoma Raceway in 2025
- Born: February 16, 2007 (age 19); Frankfort, Ohio, U.S.

NASCAR O'Reilly Auto Parts Series career
- 4 races run over 2 years
- 2026 position: 58th
- Best finish: 58th (2026)
- First race: 2025 Mission 200 at the Glen (Watkins Glen)
- Last race: 2026 Nu Way 225 (Gateway)
Wins	Top tens	Poles
0	0	0
- Statistics up to date as of November 7, 2026.

Austin J. Hill (born February 16, 2007) is an American professional auto racing driver. He last competed part-time in the NASCAR O'Reilly Auto Parts Series, driving the No. 35/53 Chevrolet Camaro SS for Joey Gase Motorsports with Scott Osteen, and the No. 30 Chevrolet Camaro SS for Barrett–Cope Racing.

== Racing career ==
=== Early career ===
Hill began racing Quarter midgets at seven years old.

=== Junior formula ===
In 2021, Hill made his debut in the SCCA Pro Series Formula Race Promotions, racing in the F2000 and Atlantic series for his family-owned team. In F2000, he won two races and ended the season runner-up in points to Trent Walko. In Atlantic, he won the Restricted Spec championship.

In 2022, Hill returned to the SCCA Pro Series championships, racing once again in both the F2000 and Atlantic series. In F2000, he won twice and finished runner-up in the standings to JC Trahan. In Atlantic, he won all but four races en route to the Open Class title.

Returning to the Atlantic series for 2023, Hill took six wins and twelve podiums on his way to his second consecutive title. In parallel to his SCCA commitments, Hill also raced in the Formula Regional Americas Championship for his family-owned team. He scored a best finish of fifth, twice, at Mid-Ohio and VIR, ending the season 11th in points in his only season in the championship.

=== Trans-Am Series ===
During 2023, Hill also raced in the XGT class of the Trans-Am Series, making his series debut at Road Atlanta. In his only race in the series, he retired after nine laps and was classified fifth in class. He finished seventh in the XGT standings.

=== SCCA Hoosier Super Tour ===
In 2024, Hill competed in the SCCA Hoosier Super Tour in both the STL and SMX classes. In the former, he finished runner-up to Danny Steyn, while in the latter, he finished fourteenth in the standings.

=== NASCAR O'Reilly Auto Parts Series ===
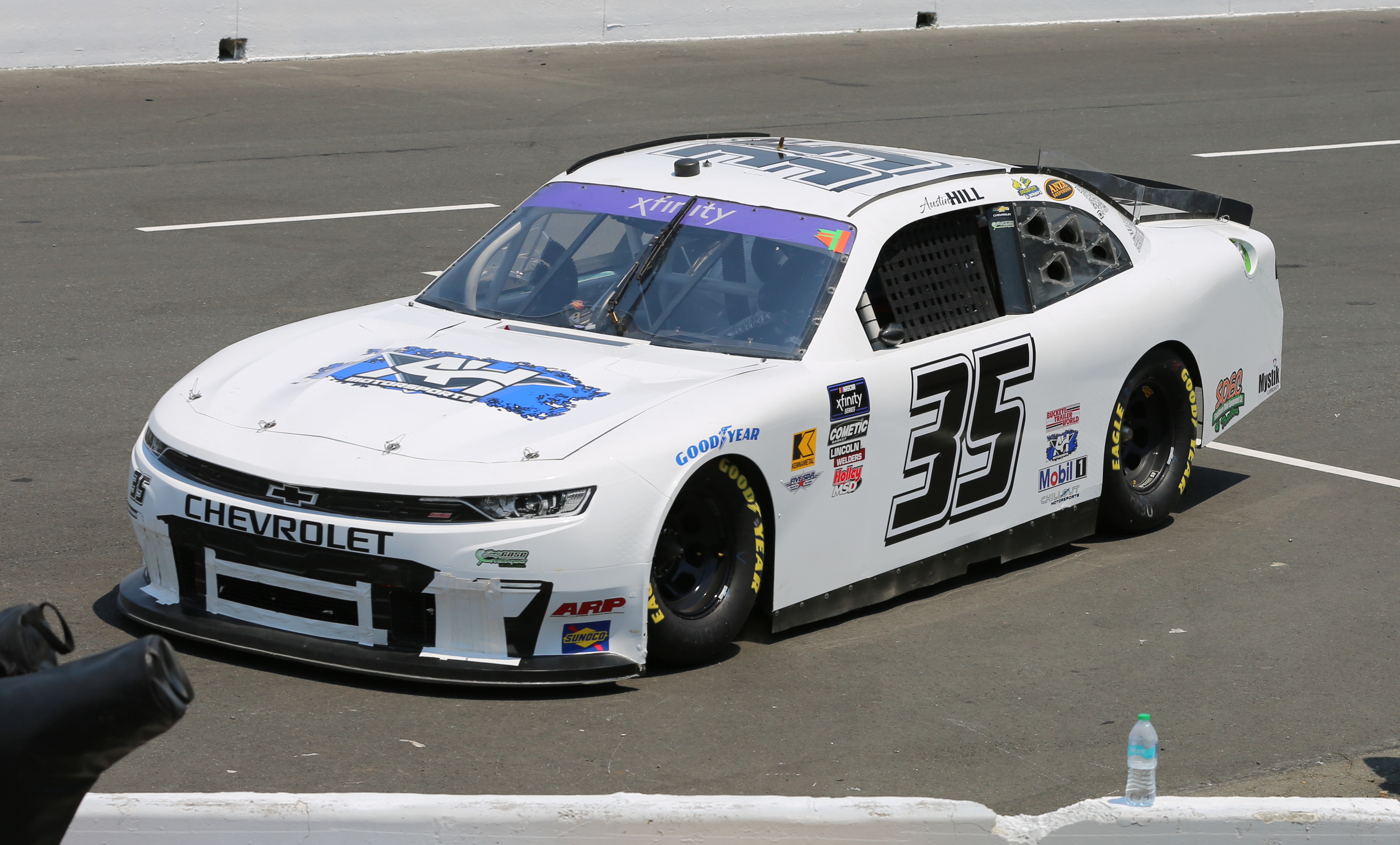
Hill's No. 35 car at Sonoma Raceway in 2025

A month after obtaining his NASCAR license, on February 25, 2025, it was announced that Hill would compete on a part-time basis in the NASCAR Xfinity Series for Joey Gase Motorsports with Scott Osteen, starting at Sonoma. In his three appearances, Hill failed to qualify at both Sonoma and the Charlotte Roval, and finished 20th in his only start of the season at Watkins Glen.

Hill returned to the newly-rebranded NASCAR O'Reilly Auto Parts Series for 2026 on a limited schedule with Joey Gase Motorsports with Scott Osteen and Barrett-Cope Racing.

=== ARCA Menards Series ===
In 2026, it was revealed that Hill would participate in the pre-season test for the ARCA Menards Series at Daytona International Speedway, driving for Fast Track Racing, where he set the 31st quickest time between the two sessions held.

== Personal life ==
Despite sharing a name, Hill is not related to the Georgia-born driver, Austin Hill.

== Racing record ==
=== Racing career summary ===
Season	Series	Team	Races	Wins	Poles	F/Laps	Podiums	Points	Position
2020	F2000 Championship Series		4	0	0	0	0	115	9th
2021	F2000 Championship Series	Hill Racing	16	3	0	1	10	572	**2nd**
2021	FRP Atlantic Championship Series – Restricted Spec	K-Hill Motorsports	9	2	1	1	9	382	**1st**
2021	SCCA National Championship Runoffs Formula X		1	0	0	0	1	—N/a	**3rd**
2021	SCCA National Championship Runoffs Formula Atlantic		1	0	0	0	0	—N/a	6th
2022	F2000 Championship Series	Hill Racing	14	2	2	1	7	477	**2nd**
2022	Atlantic Championship Series – Open class		10	6	1	4	9	484	**1st**
2022	SCCA National Championship Runoffs Formula X		1	0	0	0	1	—N/a	**2nd**
2022	SCCA National Championship Runoffs Formula Atlantic		1	0	0	0	1	—N/a	**3rd**
2023	Formula Regional Americas Championship	Austin Hill Motorsports	10	0	0	1	0	42	11th
2023	Atlantic Championship Series – Open class	Austin Hill Motorsports	8	5	4	4	7	355	**1st**
2023	Trans-Am Series – XGT		1	0	0	0	0	61	6th
2023	SCCA National Championship Runoffs Spec MX-5		2	0	0	0	0	—N/a	7th
2024	SCCA Hoosier Super Tour – STL		7	0	0	0	4	118	**2nd**
2024	SCCA Hoosier Super Tour – SMX		10	0	0	0	1	92	14th
2024	SCCA National Championship Runoffs Spec MX-5		1	0	0	0	0	—N/a	17th
2025	NASCAR Xfinity Series	Joey Gase Motorsports with Scott Osteen	1	0	0	0	0	17	62nd
2025	Trans-Am Series – XGT		1	0	0	0	1	55	6th
2026	NASCAR O'Reilly Auto Parts Series	Joey Gase Motorsports with Scott Osteen	2	0	0	0	0	9	58th
2026	NASCAR O'Reilly Auto Parts Series	Barrett-Cope Racing	1	0	0	0	0	9	58th

=== Complete Formula Regional Americas Championship results ===
(key) (Races in bold indicate pole position) (Races in italics indicate fastest lap)

Year	Team	1	2	3	4	5	6	7	8	9	10	11	12	13	14	15	16	17	18	DC	Points
2023	Austin Hill Motorsports	NOL; 1 Ret	NOL; 2 DNS	NOL; 3; 8	ROA; 1; 11	ROA; 2; 10†	ROA; 3; 8	MOH; 1; 7	MOH; 2; 8	MOH; 3; 5	NJM; 1 WD	NJM; 2 WD	NJM; 3 WD	VIR; 1; 5	VIR; 2; 8	VIR; 3 DNS	COA; 1	COA; 2	COA; 3	11th	42

=== NASCAR ===
(key) (Bold – Pole position awarded by qualifying time. Italics – Pole position earned by points standings or practice time. * – Most laps led.)

==== O'Reilly Auto Parts Series ====
NASCAR O'Reilly Auto Parts Series results
Year	Team	No.	Make	1	2	3	4	5	6	7	8	9	10	11	12	13	14	15	16	17	18	19	20	21	22	23	24	25	26	27	28	29	30	31	32	33	NOAPSC	Pts	Ref
2025	Joey Gase Motorsports with Scott Osteen	35	Chevy	DAY	ATL	COA	PHO	LVS	HOM	MAR	DAR	BRI	CAR	TAL	TEX	CLT	NSH	MXC	POC	ATL	CSC	SON; DNQ	DOV	IND	IOW							ROV; DNQ	LVS	TAL	MAR	PHO	62nd	17	
2025	Joey Gase Motorsports with Scott Osteen	53	Chevy																							GLN; 20	DAY	PIR	GTW	BRI	KAN						62nd	17	
2026	Joey Gase Motorsports with Scott Osteen	35	Chevy	DAY	ATL	COA; 38																															58th	9	
2026	Barrett-Cope Racing	30	Chevy				PHO; 34	LVS	DAR	MAR	ROC	BRI	KAN	TAL	TEX	GLN	DOV	CLT	NSH	POC	COR	SON	CHI	ATL	IND	IOW	DAY	DAR									58th	9	
2026	Joey Gase Motorsports with Scott Osteen	53	Chevy																										GTW; 32	BRI	LVS	CLT	PHO	TAL	MAR	HOM	58th	9	
