= 2026 GOVX 200 =

NASCAR O'Reilly Auto Parts Series race at EchoPark Speedway

Race details
- Race 4 of 33 in the 2026 NASCAR O'Reilly Auto Parts Series
- Date: March 7, 2026
- Location: Phoenix Raceway in Avondale, Arizona
- Course: Permanent racing facility
- Course length: 1.000 miles (1.609 km)
- Distance: 200 laps, 200 mi (320 km)
- Average speed: 93.909 miles per hour (151.132 km/h)

Pole position
Driver	Taylor Gray	Joe Gibbs Racing
- Time: 27.535

Most laps led
Driver	Jesse Love	Richard Childress Racing
- Laps: 114

Fastest lap
Driver	Jesse Love	Richard Childress Racing
- Time: 28.265

Winner
No. 7	Justin Allgaier	JR Motorsports

Television in the United States
- Network: The CW
- Announcers: Adam Alexander, Jamie McMurray, and Parker Kligerman

Radio in the United States
- Radio: MRN
- Booth announcers: Mike Bagley, Christopher Bell and Todd Gordon
- Turn announcers: Dan Hubbard (1 & 2) and Tim Catafalmo (3 & 4)

The 2026 GOVX 200 was a NASCAR O'Reilly Auto Parts Series race held on Saturday, March 7, 2026, at Phoenix Raceway in Avondale, Arizona. Contested over 200 laps on the 1.000 mi (1.609 km) oval, it was the fourth race of the 2026 NASCAR O'Reilly Auto Parts Series season, and the 22nd running of the event.

Justin Allgaier, driving for JR Motorsports, was able to prevail on a late restart, holding off a dominant Jesse Love and led the final 11 laps of the race to earn his 29th career NASCAR O'Reilly Auto Parts Series win, and his first of the season. Love had dominated the majority of the event, winning stage two and leading a race-high 114 laps, ending his race with a second-place finish. Carson Kvapil finished third, with Sheldon Creed and Sam Mayer rounding out the top five. Sammy Smith, Jeb Burton, Rajah Caruth, Corey Day, and Anthony Alfredo rounded out the top ten.

== Report ==
=== Background ===
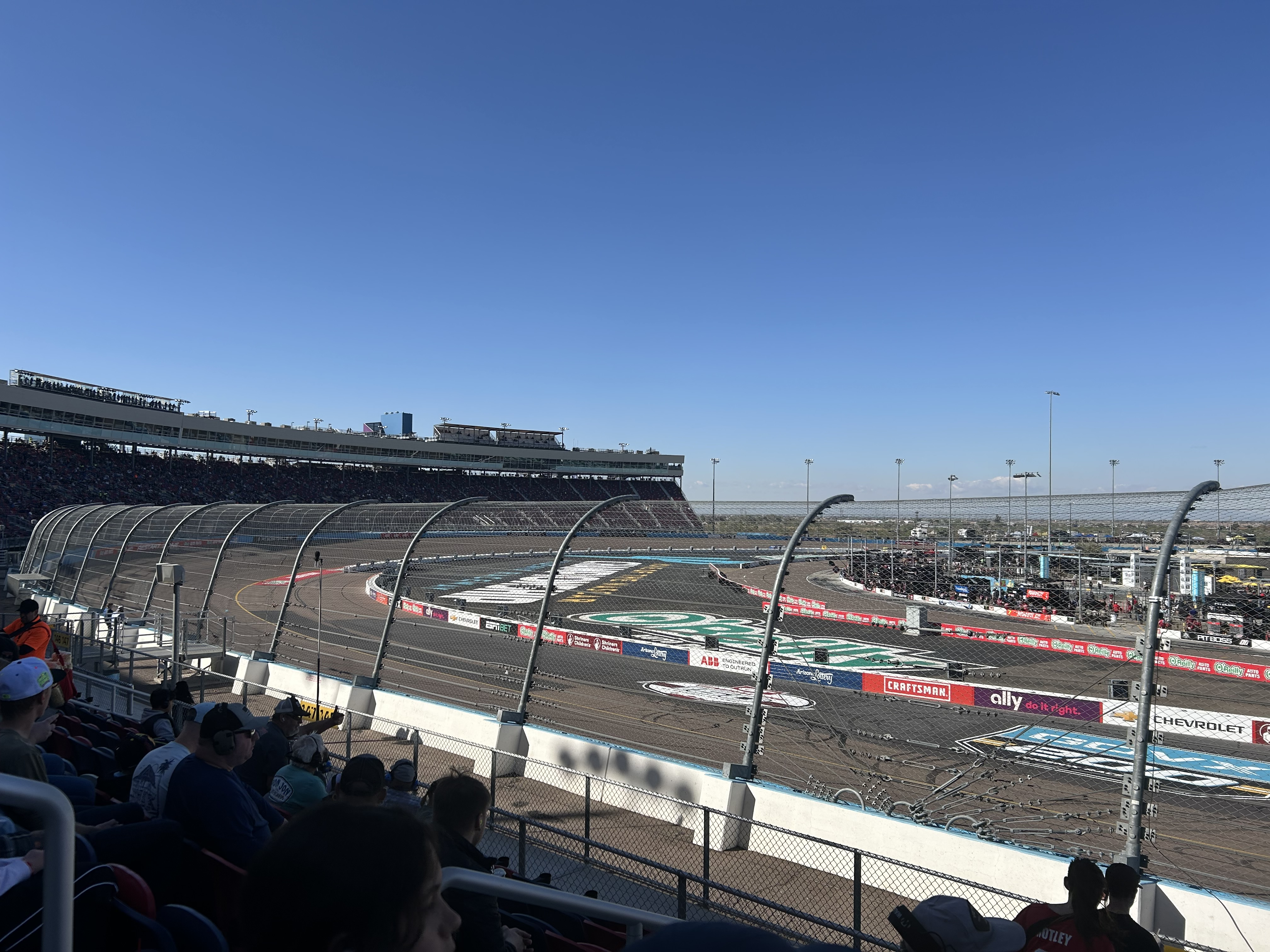
Phoenix Raceway, the circuit where the race was held.

Phoenix Raceway – also known as PIR – is a one-mile, low-banked tri-oval race track located in Avondale, Arizona. It is named after the nearby metropolitan area of Phoenix. The motorsport track opened in 1964 and currently hosts two NASCAR race weekends annually. PIR has also hosted the IndyCar Series, CART, USAC and the Rolex Sports Car Series. The raceway is currently owned and operated by NASCAR.

GOVX was announced as the title sponsor on January 10, 2025.

==== Entry list ====
- (R) denotes rookie driver.
- (i) denotes driver who is ineligible for series driver points.

#	Driver	Team	Make
00	Sheldon Creed	Haas Factory Team	Chevrolet
0	Garrett Smithley	SS-Green Light Racing	Chevrolet
1	Carson Kvapil	JR Motorsports	Chevrolet
02	Ryan Ellis	Young's Motorsports	Chevrolet
2	Jesse Love	Richard Childress Racing	Chevrolet
5	Chandler Smith (i)	Hettinger Racing	Ford
07	Josh Bilicki	SS-Green Light Racing	Chevrolet
7	Justin Allgaier	JR Motorsports	Chevrolet
8	Sammy Smith	JR Motorsports	Chevrolet
17	Corey Day	Hendrick Motorsports	Chevrolet
18	William Sawalich	Joe Gibbs Racing	Toyota
19	Brent Crews (R)	Joe Gibbs Racing	Toyota
20	Brandon Jones	Joe Gibbs Racing	Toyota
21	Austin Hill	Richard Childress Racing	Chevrolet
24	Harrison Burton	Sam Hunt Racing	Toyota
25	Nick Sanchez	AM Racing	Ford
26	Dean Thompson	Sam Hunt Racing	Toyota
27	Jeb Burton	Jordan Anderson Racing	Chevrolet
28	Kyle Sieg	RSS Racing	Chevrolet
30	Austin J. Hill	Barrett–Cope Racing	Chevrolet
31	Blaine Perkins	Jordan Anderson Racing	Chevrolet
32	Rajah Caruth	Jordan Anderson Racing	Chevrolet
35	Blake Lothian	Joey Gase Motorsports	Toyota
39	Ryan Sieg	RSS Racing	Chevrolet
41	Sam Mayer	Haas Factory Team	Chevrolet
42	Nathan Byrd	Young's Motorsports	Chevrolet
44	Brennan Poole	Alpha Prime Racing	Chevrolet
45	Lavar Scott (R)	Alpha Prime Racing	Chevrolet
48	Patrick Staropoli (R)	Big Machine Racing	Chevrolet
51	Jeremy Clements	Jeremy Clements Racing	Chevrolet
52	Daniel Dye (i)	AM Racing	Ford
54	Taylor Gray	Joe Gibbs Racing	Toyota
55	Joey Gase	Joey Gase Motorsports	Chevrolet
74	Dawson Cram	Mike Harmon Racing	Chevrolet
87	Austin Green	Peterson Racing	Chevrolet
88	William Byron (i)	JR Motorsports	Chevrolet
91	Mason Maggio	DGM Racing	Chevrolet
92	Josh Williams	DGM Racing	Chevrolet
96	Anthony Alfredo	Viking Motorsports	Chevrolet
99	Parker Retzlaff	Viking Motorsports	Chevrolet
Official entry list

== Practice ==
The first and only practice session was held on Friday, March 6, at 5:00 PM MST, and lasted for 50 minutes.

Jeb Burton, driving for Jordan Anderson Racing, set the fastest time in the session, with a lap of 27.728 seconds, and a speed of 129.833 miles per hour (208.946 km/h).

=== Practice results ===
Pos.	#	Driver	Team	Make	Time	Speed
1	27	Jeb Burton	Jordan Anderson Racing	Chevrolet	27.728	129.833
2	21	Austin Hill	Richard Childress Racing	Chevrolet	27.835	129.334
3	26	Dean Thompson	Sam Hunt Racing	Toyota	27.837	129.324
Full practice results

== Qualifying ==
Qualifying was held on Friday, March 6, at 6:05 PM MST. Since Phoenix Raceway is a mile oval, the qualifying procedure used was a single-car, one-lap system with one round. Drivers were on track by themselves and had one lap to post a qualifying time, and whoever set the fastest time won the pole.

Taylor Gray, driving for Joe Gibbs Racing, qualified on pole position with a lap of 27.535 seconds, and a speed of 130.743 miles per hour (210.410 km/h).

Two drivers failed to qualify: Josh Williams and Blake Lothian.

=== Qualifying results ===
Pos.	#	Driver	Team	Make	Time	Speed
1	54	Taylor Gray	Joe Gibbs Racing	Toyota	27.535	130.743
2	2	Jesse Love	Richard Childress Racing	Chevrolet	27.545	130.695
3	20	Brandon Jones	Joe Gibbs Racing	Toyota	27.581	130.525
4	96	Anthony Alfredo	Viking Motorsports	Chevrolet	27.671	130.100
5	19	Brent Crews (R)	Joe Gibbs Racing	Toyota	27.684	130.039
6	88	William Byron (i)	JR Motorsports	Chevrolet	27.740	129.776
7	8	Sammy Smith	JR Motorsports	Chevrolet	27.748	129.739
8	17	Corey Day	Hendrick Motorsports	Chevrolet	27.758	129.692
9	27	Jeb Burton	Jordan Anderson Racing	Chevrolet	27.776	129.608
10	28	Kyle Sieg	RSS Racing	Chevrolet	27.818	129.413
11	24	Harrison Burton	Sam Hunt Racing	Toyota	27.837	129.324
12	41	Sam Mayer	Haas Factory Team	Chevrolet	27.847	129.278
13	21	Austin Hill	Richard Childress Racing	Chevrolet	27.882	129.116
14	1	Carson Kvapil	JR Motorsports	Chevrolet	27.890	129.079
15	18	William Sawalich	Joe Gibbs Racing	Toyota	27.939	128.852
16	00	Sheldon Creed	Haas Factory Team	Chevrolet	27.943	128.834
17	7	Justin Allgaier	JR Motorsports	Chevrolet	27.969	128.714
18	39	Ryan Sieg	RSS Racing	Chevrolet	28.001	128.567
19	25	Nick Sanchez	AM Racing	Ford	28.014	128.507
20	44	Brennan Poole	Alpha Prime Racing	Chevrolet	28.022	128.470
21	51	Jeremy Clements	Jeremy Clements Racing	Chevrolet	28.024	128.461
22	0	Garrett Smithley	SS-Green Light Racing	Chevrolet	28.067	128.265
23	26	Dean Thompson	Sam Hunt Racing	Toyota	28.084	128.187
24	5	Chandler Smith (i)	Hettinger Racing	Ford	28.087	128.173
25	32	Rajah Caruth	Jordan Anderson Racing	Chevrolet	28.129	127.982
26	31	Blaine Perkins	Jordan Anderson Racing	Chevrolet	28.194	127.687
27	87	Austin Green	Peterson Racing	Chevrolet	28.195	127.682
28	48	Patrick Staropoli (R)	Big Machine Racing	Chevrolet	28.370	126.895
29	52	Daniel Dye (i)	AM Racing	Ford	28.404	126.743
30	45	Lavar Scott (R)	Alpha Prime Racing	Chevrolet	28.462	126.484
31	99	Parker Retzlaff	Viking Motorsports	Chevrolet	28.473	126.436
32	42	Nathan Byrd	Young's Motorsports	Chevrolet	28.690	125.479
Qualified by owner's points
33	07	Josh Bilicki	SS-Green Light Racing	Chevrolet	28.758	125.183
34	30	Austin J. Hill	Barrett–Cope Racing	Chevrolet	28.908	124.533
35	55	Joey Gase	Joey Gase Motorsports	Chevrolet	29.012	124.087
36	74	Dawson Cram	Mike Harmon Racing	Chevrolet	29.054	123.907
37	91	Mason Maggio	DGM Racing	Chevrolet	29.616	121.556
38	02	Ryan Ellis	Young's Motorsports	Chevrolet	—	—
Failed to qualify
39	92	Josh Williams	DGM Racing	Chevrolet	28.706	125.409
40	35	Blake Lothian	Joey Gase Motorsports	Toyota	29.264	123.018
Official qualifying results
Official starting lineup

== Race ==
=== Race results ===
==== Stage results ====
Stage One Laps: 45

Pos.	#	Driver	Team	Make	Pts
1	8	Sammy Smith	JR Motorsports	Chevrolet	10
2	2	Jesse Love	Richard Childress Racing	Chevrolet	9
3	7	Justin Allgaier	JR Motorsports	Chevrolet	8
4	1	Carson Kvapil	JR Motorsports	Chevrolet	7
5	88	William Byron (i)	JR Motorsports	Chevrolet	0
6	27	Jeb Burton	Jordan Anderson Racing	Chevrolet	5
7	17	Corey Day	Hendrick Motorsports	Chevrolet	4
8	19	Brent Crews (R)	Joe Gibbs Racing	Toyota	3
9	00	Sheldon Creed	Haas Factory Team	Chevrolet	2
10	20	Brandon Jones	Joe Gibbs Racing	Toyota	1

Stage Two Laps: 45

Pos.	#	Driver	Team	Make	Pts
1	2	Jesse Love	Richard Childress Racing	Chevrolet	10
2	1	Carson Kvapil	JR Motorsports	Chevrolet	9
3	88	William Byron (i)	JR Motorsports	Chevrolet	0
4	7	Justin Allgaier	JR Motorsports	Chevrolet	7
5	19	Brent Crews (R)	Joe Gibbs Racing	Toyota	6
6	8	Sammy Smith	JR Motorsports	Chevrolet	5
7	27	Jeb Burton	Jordan Anderson Racing	Chevrolet	4
8	54	Taylor Gray	Joe Gibbs Racing	Toyota	3
9	00	Sheldon Creed	Haas Factory Team	Chevrolet	2
10	51	Jeremy Clements	Jeremy Clements Racing	Chevrolet	1

=== Final Stage results ===
Stage Three Laps: 110

Fin	St	#	Driver	Team	Make	Laps	Led	Status	Pts
1	17	7	Justin Allgaier	JR Motorsports	Chevrolet	200	11	Running	69
2	2	2	Jesse Love	Richard Childress Racing	Chevrolet	200	114	Running	55
3	14	1	Carson Kvapil	JR Motorsports	Chevrolet	200	22	Running	51
4	16	00	Sheldon Creed	Haas Factory Team	Chevrolet	200	20	Running	37
5	12	41	Sam Mayer	Haas Factory Team	Chevrolet	200	11	Running	34
6	7	8	Sammy Smith	JR Motorsports	Chevrolet	200	10	Running	46
7	9	27	Jeb Burton	Jordan Anderson Racing	Chevrolet	200	1	Running	39
8	25	32	Rajah Caruth	Jordan Anderson Racing	Chevrolet	200	1	Running	29
9	8	17	Corey Day	Hendrick Motorsports	Chevrolet	200	0	Running	32
10	4	96	Anthony Alfredo	Viking Motorsports	Chevrolet	200	0	Running	27
11	21	51	Jeremy Clements	Jeremy Clements Racing	Chevrolet	200	0	Running	27
12	13	21	Austin Hill	Richard Childress Racing	Chevrolet	200	0	Running	25
13	6	88	William Byron (i)	JR Motorsports	Chevrolet	200	0	Running	0
14	31	99	Parker Retzlaff	Viking Motorsports	Chevrolet	200	0	Running	23
15	1	54	Taylor Gray	Joe Gibbs Racing	Toyota	200	10	Running	25
16	3	20	Brandon Jones	Joe Gibbs Racing	Toyota	200	0	Running	22
17	18	39	Ryan Sieg	RSS Racing	Chevrolet	200	0	Running	20
18	5	19	Brent Crews (R)	Joe Gibbs Racing	Toyota	200	0	Running	28
19	35	55	Joey Gase	Joey Gase Motorsports	Chevrolet	200	0	Running	18
20	29	52	Daniel Dye (i)	AM Racing	Ford	199	0	Running	0
21	24	5	Chandler Smith (i)	Hettinger Racing	Ford	199	0	Running	0
22	27	87	Austin Green	Peterson Racing	Chevrolet	199	0	Running	15
23	11	24	Harrison Burton	Sam Hunt Racing	Toyota	199	0	Running	14
24	10	28	Kyle Sieg	RSS Racing	Chevrolet	199	0	Running	13
25	23	26	Dean Thompson	Sam Hunt Racing	Toyota	199	0	Running	12
26	28	48	Patrick Staropoli (R)	Big Machine Racing	Chevrolet	199	0	Running	11
27	20	44	Brennan Poole	Alpha Prime Racing	Chevrolet	199	0	Running	10
28	26	31	Blaine Perkins	Jordan Anderson Racing	Chevrolet	198	0	Running	9
29	22	0	Garrett Smithley	SS-Green Light Racing	Chevrolet	198	0	Running	8
30	33	07	Josh Bilicki	SS-Green Light Racing	Chevrolet	197	0	Running	7
31	32	42	Nathan Byrd	Young's Motorsports	Chevrolet	197	0	Running	6
32	37	91	Mason Maggio	DGM Racing	Chevrolet	196	0	Running	5
33	30	45	Lavar Scott (R)	Alpha Prime Racing	Chevrolet	195	0	Running	4
34	34	30	Austin J. Hill	Barrett–Cope Racing	Chevrolet	195	0	Running	3
35	19	25	Nick Sanchez	AM Racing	Ford	193	0	Running	2
36	36	74	Dawson Cram	Mike Harmon Racing	Chevrolet	192	0	Running	1
37	15	18	William Sawalich	Joe Gibbs Racing	Toyota	173	0	Accident	1
38	38	02	Ryan Ellis	Young's Motorsports	Chevrolet	13	0	Suspension	1
Official race results

=== Race statistics ===
- Lead changes: 20 among 9 different drivers
- Cautions/Laps: 4 for 37 laps
- Red flags: 0
- Time of race: 2 hours, 7 minutes and 47 seconds
- Average speed: 93.909 miles per hour (151.132 km/h)

== Standings after the race ==
Drivers' Championship standings

	Pos	Driver	Points
2	1	Justin Allgaier	184
	2	Jesse Love	181 (–3)
2	3	Austin Hill	179 (–5)
1	4	Carson Kvapil	146 (–38)
1	5	Sheldon Creed	143 (–41)
1	6	Sammy Smith	132 (–52)
1	7	Rajah Caruth	119 (–65)
	8	Corey Day	118 (–66)
1	9	Sam Mayer	110 (–74)
1	10	Parker Retzlaff	104 (–80)
	11	Brandon Jones	95 (–89)
6	12	Jeb Burton	94 (–90)
Official driver's standings

Manufacturers' Championship standings

Pos	Manufacturer	Points
1	Chevrolet	220
2	Toyota	92 (–128)
3	Ford	79 (–141)

- Note: Only the first 12 positions are included for the driver standings.

Previous race: 2026 Focused Health 250 (COTA)	NASCAR O'Reilly Auto Parts Series; 2026 season	Next race: 2026 The LiUNA!
