= 2021 F2000 Championship Series =

11th season of the F2000 Championship Series

2021 F2000 season

Season
- Races: 16
- Start date: April 1
- End date: October 17

Awards
- Drivers' champion: Trent Walko

The 2021 F2000 Championship Series season is the eleventh season of the F2000 Championship Series. The sixteen round season began on April 1 at Carolina Motorsports Park, and finished on October 17 at Pittsburgh International Race Complex.

Last year's champion, Brandon Dixon, became a three-time champion in the series, and continues to race in this years season.

== Drivers and teams ==
Team	No.	Drivers	Rounds	Chassis
(United States) Brandon Dixon Racing	7	(United States) Brandon Dixon	1–2, 5–6	Citation
(United States) FatBoy Racing!	44	(United States) Charles Finelli	13–14	Van Diemen
(United States) Gregory Racing	18	(United States) Gray Gregory	5–6	Van Diemen
(United States) Global Racing Team	6	(United States) V. Glace	15–16	Van Diemen
(United States) Global Racing Team	72	(United States) Dimitrios Tsesmetzis	3–16	Van Diemen
(United States) Global Racing Team	91	(United States) Trent Walko	3–16	Van Diemen
(United States) Global Racing Team/Byrd Racing	6	(United States) Nathan Byrd	7–8, 16	Van Diemen
(United States) Hill Racing	8	(United States) Austin Hill	All	Van Diemen
(United States) Lee Racing	0	(United States) Mark Defer	3–4	Van Diemen
(United States) Palacio Racing	25	(United States) Nick Palacio	11–12	Van Diemen
(United States) Proper Performance	21	(United States) Thomas Cadwalader	All	Van Diemen
(United States) Reece Everard Motorsports	93	(United States) Reece Everard	1–2, 5–6	Van Diemen
(United States) Speed Sport Engineering	65	(United States) Michael Varacins	3–4	Van Diemen
(United States) Team Pelfrey	56	(Canada) Mac Clark	3–4	Elan
(United States) Team Pelfrey	89	(United States) Dexter Czuba	3–10	Elan
(United States) Weitzenhof Racing	67	(United States) Dave Weitzenhof	1–4, 7–16	Citation
(United States) Wright Racing	90	(United States) Robert Wright	All	Elan
	7	(United States) Ej Korecky	7–8	Elan
	10	(United States) Dylan Schenk	9–10	Elan
	10	(United States) Gabriele Jasper	3–4	Van Diemen
	27	(United States) Hartley MacDonald	5–8	Elan
	80	(United States) Steve Thomson	9–10	Van Diemen
	95	(United States) Alan Guibord	7–8	Elan

== Schedule ==
Rd.	Date	Track	Location
1	April 1–3	Carolina Motorsports Park	Kershaw, South Carolina
2	April 1–3	Carolina Motorsports Park	Kershaw, South Carolina
3	April 30 - May 2	Mid-Ohio Sports Car Course	Lexington, Ohio
4	April 30 - May 2	Mid-Ohio Sports Car Course	Lexington, Ohio
5	May 20–23	Barber Motorsports Park	Birmingham, Alabama
6	May 20–23	Barber Motorsports Park	Birmingham, Alabama
7	June 18–20	Pittsburgh International Race Complex	Wampum, Pennsylvania
8	June 18–20	Pittsburgh International Race Complex	Wampum, Pennsylvania
9	July 30 - August 1	Road America	Elkhart Lake, Wisconsin
10	July 30 - August 1	Road America	Elkhart Lake, Wisconsin
11	August 20–22	Summit Point Motorsports Park	Summit Point, West Virginia
12	August 20–22	Summit Point Motorsports Park	Summit Point, West Virginia
13	September 10–12	Autobahn Country Club	Joliet, Illinois
14	September 10–12	Autobahn Country Club	Joliet, Illinois
15	October 15–17	Pittsburgh International Race Complex	Wampum, Pennsylvania
16	October 15–17	Pittsburgh International Race Complex	Wampum, Pennsylvania

== Driver Standings ==
Pos	Driver	CMP		MO		BAR		PITT		RA		SP		ABCC		PITT		Pts
1	(United States) Trent Walko			3	2	**2**	**1**	**2**	**1**	**1**	**1**	**1**	**DNF**	**1**	**1**	1	5	645
2	(United States) Austin Hill	3	3	4	4	DNF	5	1	2	2	5	3	1	2	DNF	2	1	572
3	(United States) Robert Wright	4	5	6	5	3	DNF	7	5	5	3	4	4	4	3	3	3	471
4	(United States) Dexter Czuba			8	3	4	4	3	3	3	2							283
5	(United States) Dimitrios Tsesmetzis			11	10	5	6	8	8			5	3					218
6	(United States) Brandon Dixon	**1**	2			1	2											189
7	(United States) Reece Everard	DSQ	**1**			6	3											121
8	(United States) Gabriele Jasper			10	8											4	4	114
9	(Canada) Mac Clark			**1**	**1**													110
10	(United States) Thomas Cadwalader	2	4	5														107
11	(United States) Nathan Byrd							5	6								2	102
12	(United States) Dave Weitzenhof	DNS	DNS	7	6			DNS	4									90
13	(United States) Nick Palacio											2	2					84
14	(United States) Charles Finelli													DSQ	4			74
15	(United States) TJ Zimmerman													3	2			68
16	(United States) Michael Varacins			2	9													65
17	(United States) Hartley MacDonald					DNF	DNF	4	7									63
17	(United States) Steve Thomson									6	4							63
19	(United States) Mark Defer			10	7													50
20	(United States) Dylan Schenk									4	DNF							35
21	(United States) Alan Guibord							6										29
Pos	Driver	CMP		MO		BAR		PITT		RA		SP		ABCC		PITT		Pts

Color	Result
Gold	Winner
Silver	2nd-place finish
Bronze	3rd-place finish
Green	Top 5 finish
Light Blue	Top 10 finish
Dark Blue	Other flagged position
Purple	Did not finish
Red	Did not qualify (DNQ)
Brown	Withdrew (Wth)
Black	Disqualified (DSQ)
White	Did Not Start (DNS)
White	Race abandoned (C)
Blank	Did not participate

**In-line notation**
**Bold**	Pole position (3 points)
Italics	Fastest lap of the race (2 points)

== See also ==
- F2000 Championship Series
