= 2026 Sport Clips Haircuts VFW 200 =

NASCAR O'Reilly Auto Parts Series race at Darlington Raceway

2026 Sports Clips Haircuts VFW 200
Race details
- Race 6 of 33 in the 2026 NASCAR O'Reilly Auto Parts Series
- Date: March 21, 2026
- Location: Darlington Raceway in Darlington, South Carolina
- Course: Permanent racing facility
- Course length: 1.366 miles (2.198 km)
- Distance: 147 laps, 200.802 mi (323.159 km)
- Average speed: 112.442 miles per hour (180.958 km/h)

Pole position
Driver	Kyle Larson	JR Motorsports
- Time: 29.994

Most laps led
Driver	Kyle Larson	JR Motorsports
- Laps: 107

Fastest lap
Driver	Justin Allgaier	JR Motorsports
- Time: 30.438

Winner
No. 7	Justin Allgaier	JR Motorsports

Television in the United States
- Network: The CW
- Announcers: Adam Alexander, Jamie McMurray, and Parker Kligerman

Radio in the United States
- Radio: MRN
- Booth announcers: Alex Hayden, Mike Bagley, and Todd Gordon
- Turn announcers: Dave Moody (1 & 2) and Tim Catafalmo (3 & 4)

The 2026 Sports Clips Haircuts VFW 200 was a NASCAR O'Reilly Auto Parts Series race held on Saturday, March 21, 2026, at Darlington Raceway in Darlington, South Carolina. Contested over 147 laps on the 1.366-mile (2.198 km) egg-shaped oval, it was the sixth race of the 2026 NASCAR O'Reilly Auto Parts Series season, and the 44th running of the event.

Justin Allgaier, driving for JR Motorsports, took advantage of a late restart, leading the final 14 laps and held off Brandon Jones in the closing stages to earn his 30th career NASCAR O'Reilly Auto Parts Series win, and his second of the season. Allgaier's teammate Kyle Larson was the most dominant driver of the race, winning both stages and led a race-high 107 laps, before a late pit stop cycled him back and was unable to retake the lead. Jones finished second, and Christopher Bell finished third. Larson and Carson Kvapil rounded out the top five, while Corey Day, Sheldon Creed, Parker Retzlaff, Sammy Smith, and Sam Mayer rounded out the top ten.

== Report ==
=== Background ===
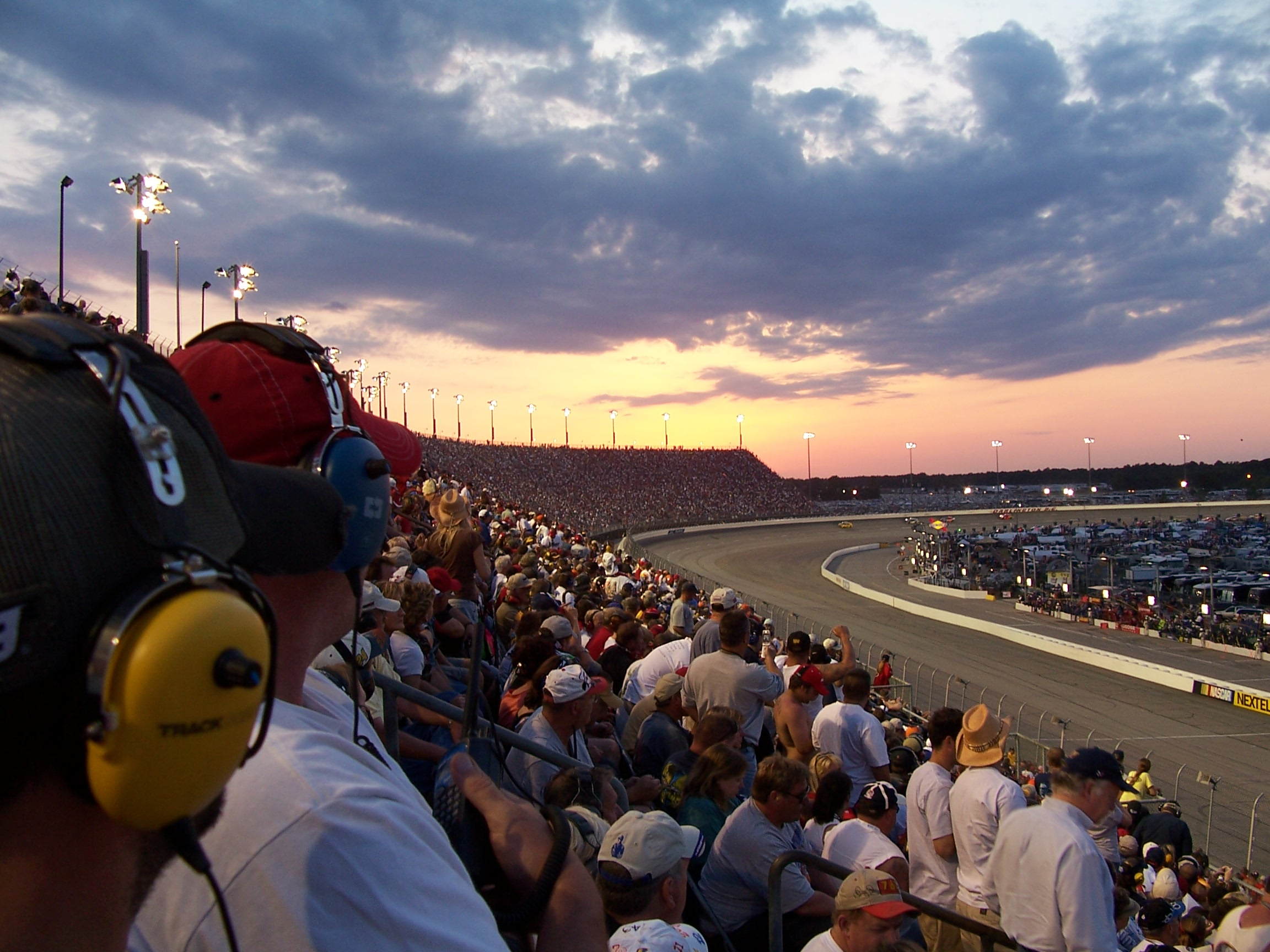
Darlington Raceway, the track where the race was held.

Darlington Raceway is a race track built for NASCAR racing located near Darlington, South Carolina. It is nicknamed "The Lady in Black" and "The Track Too Tough to Tame" by many NASCAR fans and drivers and advertised as "A NASCAR Tradition." It is of a unique, somewhat egg-shaped design, an oval with the ends of very different configurations, a condition which supposedly arose from the proximity of one end of the track to a minnow pond the owner refused to relocate. This situation makes it very challenging for the crews to set up their cars' handling in a way that is effective at both ends.

=== Surface issues ===
Darlington Raceway was last repaved following the May 2007 meeting (from 2005 to 2019, there was only one meeting; the second meeting was reinstated in 2020), and from 2008 to 2019, there was one night race. In 2020, a day race returned to the schedule, and instead of two races (one Xfinity and one Cup) during the entire year, the track hosted six races (three Cup, two Xfinity, and one Truck). The circuit kept repairing the circuit with patches during each summer before the annual Cup race in September. The circuit's narrow Turn 2 rapidly deteriorated with cracks in the tarmac allowing water to seep in the circuit. In July 2021, the circuit repaved a six hundred foot section at the entrance of Turn 2 and ending at the exit of the turn to repair the tarmac and resolve the issue for safety and to reduce the threat of weepers and surface issues in that section of the circuit.

==== Entry list ====
- (R) denotes rookie driver.
- (i) denotes driver who is ineligible for series driver points.

#	Driver	Team	Make
00	Sheldon Creed	Haas Factory Team	Chevrolet
0	Garrett Smithley	SS-Green Light Racing	Chevrolet
1	Carson Kvapil	JR Motorsports	Chevrolet
02	Ryan Ellis	Young's Motorsports	Chevrolet
2	Jesse Love	Richard Childress Racing	Chevrolet
5	J. J. Yeley	Hettinger Racing	Ford
07	Josh Bilicki	SS-Green Light Racing	Chevrolet
7	Justin Allgaier	JR Motorsports	Chevrolet
8	Sammy Smith	JR Motorsports	Chevrolet
9	Ross Chastain (i)	JR Motorsports	Chevrolet
17	Corey Day	Hendrick Motorsports	Chevrolet
18	William Sawalich	Joe Gibbs Racing	Toyota
19	Christopher Bell (i)	Joe Gibbs Racing	Toyota
20	Brandon Jones	Joe Gibbs Racing	Toyota
21	Austin Hill	Richard Childress Racing	Chevrolet
24	Harrison Burton	Sam Hunt Racing	Toyota
25	Nick Sanchez	AM Racing	Ford
26	Dean Thompson	Sam Hunt Racing	Toyota
27	Jeb Burton	Jordan Anderson Racing	Chevrolet
28	Kyle Sieg	RSS Racing	Chevrolet
30	Myatt Snider	Barrett–Cope Racing	Chevrolet
31	Blaine Perkins	Jordan Anderson Racing	Chevrolet
32	Rajah Caruth	Jordan Anderson Racing	Chevrolet
35	Matt DiBenedetto	Joey Gase Motorsports	Chevrolet
39	Ryan Sieg	RSS Racing	Chevrolet
41	Sam Mayer	Haas Factory Team	Chevrolet
42	Nathan Byrd	Young's Motorsports	Chevrolet
44	Brennan Poole	Alpha Prime Racing	Chevrolet
45	Lavar Scott (R)	Alpha Prime Racing	Chevrolet
48	Patrick Staropoli (R)	Big Machine Racing	Chevrolet
51	Jeremy Clements	Jeremy Clements Racing	Chevrolet
54	Taylor Gray	Joe Gibbs Racing	Toyota
55	Joey Gase	Joey Gase Motorsports	Chevrolet
87	Austin Green	Peterson Racing	Chevrolet
88	Kyle Larson (i)	JR Motorsports	Chevrolet
91	Alex Labbé	DGM Racing	Chevrolet
92	Josh Williams	DGM Racing	Chevrolet
96	Anthony Alfredo	Viking Motorsports	Chevrolet
99	Parker Retzlaff	Viking Motorsports	Chevrolet
Official entry list

== Practice ==
The first and only practice session was held on Saturday, March 21, at 12:00 PM EST, and lasted for 50 minutes.

Christopher Bell, driving for Joe Gibbs Racing, set the fastest time in the session, with a lap of 30.149 seconds, and a speed of 163.110 miles per hour (262.500 km/h).

=== Practice results ===
Pos.	#	Driver	Team	Make	Time	Speed
1	19	Christopher Bell (i)	Joe Gibbs Racing	Toyota	30.149	163.110
2	20	Brandon Jones	Joe Gibbs Racing	Toyota	30.280	162.404
3	99	Parker Retzlaff	Viking Motorsports	Chevrolet	30.295	162.324
Full practice results

== Qualifying ==
Qualifying was held on Saturday, March 21, at 1:05 PM EST. Since Darlington Raceway is an intermediate racetrack, the qualifying procedure used was a single-car, one-lap system with one round. Drivers were on track by themselves and had one lap to post a qualifying time, and whoever set the fastest time won the pole.

Kyle Larson, driving for JR Motorsports, qualified on pole position with a lap of 29.994 seconds, and a speed of 163.953 miles per hour (263.857 km/h).

Matt DiBenedetto was the only driver who failed to qualify.

=== Qualifying results ===
Pos.	#	Driver	Team	Make	Time	Speed
1	88	Kyle Larson (i)	JR Motorsports	Chevrolet	29.994	163.953
2	19	Christopher Bell (i)	Joe Gibbs Racing	Toyota	30.041	163.696
3	1	Carson Kvapil	JR Motorsports	Chevrolet	30.180	162.942
4	7	Justin Allgaier	JR Motorsports	Chevrolet	30.220	162.727
5	99	Parker Retzlaff	Viking Motorsports	Chevrolet	30.299	162.302
6	41	Sam Mayer	Haas Factory Team	Chevrolet	30.307	162.260
7	18	William Sawalich	Joe Gibbs Racing	Toyota	30.338	162.094
8	20	Brandon Jones	Joe Gibbs Racing	Toyota	30.355	162.003
9	9	Ross Chastain (i)	JR Motorsports	Chevrolet	30.400	161.763
10	2	Jesse Love	Richard Childress Racing	Chevrolet	30.411	161.705
11	21	Austin Hill	Richard Childress Racing	Chevrolet	30.436	161.572
12	17	Corey Day	Hendrick Motorsports	Chevrolet	30.447	161.513
13	00	Sheldon Creed	Haas Factory Team	Chevrolet	30.467	161.407
14	24	Harrison Burton	Sam Hunt Racing	Toyota	30.481	161.333
15	54	Taylor Gray	Joe Gibbs Racing	Toyota	30.507	161.196
16	28	Kyle Sieg	RSS Racing	Chevrolet	30.513	161.164
17	92	Josh Williams	DGM Racing	Chevrolet	30.621	160.596
18	8	Sammy Smith	JR Motorsports	Chevrolet	30.644	160.475
19	32	Rajah Caruth	Jordan Anderson Racing	Chevrolet	30.683	160.271
20	5	J. J. Yeley	Hettinger Racing	Ford	30.707	160.146
21	96	Anthony Alfredo	Viking Motorsports	Chevrolet	30.736	159.995
22	39	Ryan Sieg	RSS Racing	Chevrolet	30.761	159.865
23	44	Brennan Poole	Alpha Prime Racing	Chevrolet	30.769	159.823
24	0	Garrett Smithley	SS-Green Light Racing	Chevrolet	30.809	159.616
25	27	Jeb Burton	Jordan Anderson Racing	Chevrolet	30.841	159.450
26	31	Blaine Perkins	Jordan Anderson Racing	Chevrolet	30.873	159.285
27	25	Nick Sanchez	AM Racing	Ford	30.874	159.280
28	48	Patrick Staropoli (R)	Big Machine Racing	Chevrolet	30.910	159.094
29	45	Lavar Scott (R)	Alpha Prime Racing	Chevrolet	30.924	159.022
30	51	Jeremy Clements	Jeremy Clements Racing	Chevrolet	30.955	158.863
31	87	Austin Green	Peterson Racing	Chevrolet	30.966	158.806
32	07	Josh Bilicki	SS-Green Light Racing	Chevrolet	31.008	158.591
Qualified by owner's points
33	26	Dean Thompson	Sam Hunt Racing	Toyota	31.140	157.919
34	91	Alex Labbé	DGM Racing	Chevrolet	31.225	157.489
35	30	Myatt Snider	Barrett–Cope Racing	Chevrolet	31.254	157.343
36	02	Ryan Ellis	Young's Motorsports	Chevrolet	31.297	157.127
37	55	Joey Gase	Joey Gase Motorsports	Chevrolet	31.507	156.080
38	42	Nathan Byrd	Young's Motorsports	Chevrolet	—	—
Failed to qualify
39	35	Matt DiBenedetto	Joey Gase Motorsports	Chevrolet	31.063	158.311
Official qualifying results
Official starting lineup

== Race ==
=== Race results ===
==== Stage results ====
Stage One Laps: 45

Pos.	#	Driver	Team	Make	Pts
1	88	Kyle Larson (i)	JR Motorsports	Chevrolet	0
2	19	Christopher Bell (i)	Joe Gibbs Racing	Toyota	0
3	1	Carson Kvapil	JR Motorsports	Chevrolet	8
4	20	Brandon Jones	Joe Gibbs Racing	Toyota	7
5	7	Justin Allgaier	JR Motorsports	Chevrolet	6
6	99	Parker Retzlaff	Viking Motorsports	Chevrolet	5
7	2	Jesse Love	Richard Childress Racing	Chevrolet	4
8	18	William Sawalich	Joe Gibbs Racing	Toyota	3
9	96	Anthony Alfredo	Viking Motorsports	Chevrolet	2
10	9	Ross Chastain (i)	JR Motorsports	Chevrolet	0

Stage Two Laps: 45

Pos.	#	Driver	Team	Make	Pts
1	88	Kyle Larson (i)	JR Motorsports	Chevrolet	0
2	1	Carson Kvapil	JR Motorsports	Chevrolet	9
3	20	Brandon Jones	Joe Gibbs Racing	Toyota	8
4	7	Justin Allgaier	JR Motorsports	Chevrolet	7
5	99	Parker Retzlaff	Viking Motorsports	Chevrolet	6
6	9	Ross Chastain (i)	JR Motorsports	Chevrolet	0
7	96	Anthony Alfredo	Viking Motorsports	Chevrolet	4
8	17	Corey Day	Hendrick Motorsports	Chevrolet	3
9	19	Christopher Bell (i)	Joe Gibbs Racing	Toyota	0
10	18	William Sawalich	Joe Gibbs Racing	Toyota	1

=== Final Stage results ===
Stage Three Laps: 57

Fin	St	#	Driver	Team	Make	Laps	Led	Status	Pts
1	4	7	Justin Allgaier	JR Motorsports	Chevrolet	147	31	Running	69
2	8	20	Brandon Jones	Joe Gibbs Racing	Toyota	147	8	Running	50
3	2	19	Christopher Bell (i)	Joe Gibbs Racing	Toyota	147	0	Running	0
4	1	88	Kyle Larson (i)	JR Motorsports	Chevrolet	147	107	Running	0
5	3	1	Carson Kvapil	JR Motorsports	Chevrolet	147	0	Running	49
6	12	17	Corey Day	Hendrick Motorsports	Chevrolet	147	0	Running	34
7	13	00	Sheldon Creed	Haas Factory Team	Chevrolet	147	0	Running	30
8	5	99	Parker Retzlaff	Viking Motorsports	Chevrolet	147	0	Running	40
9	18	8	Sammy Smith	JR Motorsports	Chevrolet	147	0	Running	28
10	6	41	Sam Mayer	Haas Factory Team	Chevrolet	147	0	Running	27
11	10	2	Jesse Love	Richard Childress Racing	Chevrolet	147	0	Running	30
12	21	96	Anthony Alfredo	Viking Motorsports	Chevrolet	147	0	Running	31
13	22	39	Ryan Sieg	RSS Racing	Chevrolet	147	0	Running	24
14	9	9	Ross Chastain (i)	JR Motorsports	Chevrolet	147	0	Running	0
15	15	54	Taylor Gray	Joe Gibbs Racing	Toyota	147	0	Running	22
16	27	25	Nick Sanchez	AM Racing	Ford	147	0	Running	21
17	7	18	William Sawalich	Joe Gibbs Racing	Toyota	147	0	Running	24
18	23	44	Brennan Poole	Alpha Prime Racing	Chevrolet	147	0	Running	19
19	30	51	Jeremy Clements	Jeremy Clements Racing	Chevrolet	147	0	Running	18
20	32	07	Josh Bilicki	SS-Green Light Racing	Chevrolet	147	0	Running	17
21	33	26	Dean Thompson	Sam Hunt Racing	Toyota	147	0	Running	16
22	14	24	Harrison Burton	Sam Hunt Racing	Toyota	147	0	Running	15
23	19	32	Rajah Caruth	Jordan Anderson Racing	Chevrolet	147	0	Running	14
24	17	92	Josh Williams	DGM Racing	Chevrolet	147	1	Running	13
25	20	5	J. J. Yeley	Hettinger Racing	Ford	147	0	Running	12
26	25	27	Jeb Burton	Jordan Anderson Racing	Chevrolet	147	0	Running	11
27	24	0	Garrett Smithley	SS-Green Light Racing	Chevrolet	147	0	Running	10
28	31	87	Austin Green	Peterson Racing	Chevrolet	146	0	Running	9
29	28	48	Patrick Staropoli (R)	Big Machine Racing	Chevrolet	146	0	Running	8
30	26	31	Blaine Perkins	Jordan Anderson Racing	Chevrolet	146	0	Running	7
31	37	55	Joey Gase	Joey Gase Motorsports	Chevrolet	145	0	Running	6
32	36	02	Ryan Ellis	Young's Motorsports	Chevrolet	145	0	Running	5
33	35	30	Myatt Snider	Barrett–Cope Racing	Chevrolet	145	0	Running	4
34	38	42	Nathan Byrd	Young's Motorsports	Chevrolet	145	0	Running	3
35	11	21	Austin Hill	Richard Childress Racing	Chevrolet	142	0	Running	2
36	29	45	Lavar Scott (R)	Alpha Prime Racing	Chevrolet	123	0	Accident	1
37	16	28	Kyle Sieg	RSS Racing	Chevrolet	121	0	DVP	1
38	34	91	Alex Labbé	DGM Racing	Chevrolet	120	0	Accident	1
Official race results

=== Race statistics ===
- Lead changes: 6 among 4 different drivers
- Cautions/Laps: 3 for 25 laps
- Red flags: 0
- Time of race: 1 hour, 47 minutes and 9 seconds
- Average speed: 112.442 miles per hour (180.958 km/h)

== Standings after the race ==
Drivers' Championship standings

	Pos	Driver	Points
	1	Justin Allgaier	306
	2	Jesse Love	254 (–52)
2	3	Carson Kvapil	222 (–84)
	4	Sheldon Creed	218 (–88)
2	5	Austin Hill	210 (–96)
	6	Sammy Smith	192 (–114)
	7	Corey Day	188 (–118)
3	8	Brandon Jones	170 (–136)
	9	Parker Retzlaff	169 (–137)
2	10	Rajah Caruth	151 (–155)
1	11	Sam Mayer	149 (–157)
	12	Taylor Gray	132 (–174)
Official driver's standings

Manufacturers' Championship standings

Pos	Manufacturer	Points
1	Chevrolet	330
2	Toyota	162 (–168)
3	Ford	122 (–208)

- Note: Only the first 12 positions are included for the driver standings.

Previous race: 2026 The LiUNA!	NASCAR O'Reilly Auto Parts Series; 2026 season	Next race: 2026 NFPA 250
