= 2022 F2000 Championship Series =

12th season of the F2000 Championship Series

2022 F2000 season

Season
- Races: 14
- Start date: April 1
- End date: October 16

Awards
- Drivers' champion: (Canada) JC Trahan
- Manufacturers' Cup: (United Kingdom) Van Diemen

The 2022 F2000 Championship Series season was the eleventh season of the F2000 Championship Series. The sixteen round season began on April 1 at Carolina Motorsports Park, and finished on October 16 at Pittsburgh International Race Complex.

Last year's champion, Trent Walko of Global Racing Team, won his first championship. JC Trahan won the championship with Global Racing Team.

== Drivers and teams ==
Team	No.	Drivers	Rounds	Chassis	Engine
(United States) Arrive Drive Motorsports	95	(United States) Tommy Cadwalder	1–2	Elan	Mazda
(United States) Arrive Drive Motorsports	95	(United States) Ayrton Houk	5–6	Elan	Mazda
(United States) Arrive Drive Motorsports	95	(United States) Laura Hayes	7–8	Elan	Mazda
(United States) Arrive Drive Motorsports	96	(United States) Nathan Byrd	1–10, 13–14	Elan	Mazda
(United States) Brumder Racing	56	(United States) John Brumder	7–8	Van Diemen	Mazda
(United States) Global Racing Team	12	(Canada) JC Trahan	3–12	Van Diemen	Zetec
(United States) Global Racing Team	31	(United States) Amandeep Pothani	3–4, 11–12	Van Diemen	Mazda
(United States) Global Racing Team	72	(Greece) Dimitrios Tsesmetzis	3–8, 11–12	Van Diemen	Mazda
(United States) Hill Racing	8	(United States) Austin Hill	All	Elan	Mazda
(United States) Jasper Racing	66	(United States) Gabriele Jasper	11–12	Van Diemen	Zetec
(United States) LTD Motorsports	45	(United States) Dean Kiriluk	3–4	Van Diemen	
(United States) LTD Motorsports	52	(United States) Robert Allaer	3–4	Van Diemen	Zetec
(United States) Madgame Racing	58	(United States) Mike Pepitone	7–8, 11–12	RFR	Zetec
(United States) MERC Racing	45	(United States) Leslie Walker	11–12	Van Diemen	Zetec
(United States) Novosielski Racing	33	(United States) JT Novosielski	1–4, 9–10	Van Diemen	
(United States) Peluso Racing	03	(United States) Greg Peluso	7–8	Van Diemen	Zetec
(United States) Speed Sport Engineering	65	(United States) Michael Varacins	3–4	Van Diemen	Zetec
(United States) Tarantula Racing	2	(United States) Daniel Galiffa	7–8	Van Diemen	Mazda
(United States) Team Pelfrey	84	(United States) David Adorno	1–2	Van Diemen	Mazda
(United States) Team Pelfrey	90	(United States) Dexter Czuba	7–8	Elan	Mazda
(United States) Weitzenhof Racing	67	(United States) Dave Weitzenhof	3–4, 7–12	Citation	Zetec
(United States) Wright Racing	90	(United States) Robert Wright	All	Elan	Mazda
	00	(United States) Andrew Gamble	7–8	Van Diemen	Zetec
	27	(United States) Hartley MacDonald	3–4	Van Diemen	Zetec
	41	(United States) Glenn Cordova	11–12	Van Diemen	Pinto
	88	(United States) Tim Minor	11–12	Citation	Zetec

== Schedule ==
Rd.	Date	Track	Location
1	April 1–3	Carolina Motorsports Park	Kershaw, South Carolina
2	April 1–3	Carolina Motorsports Park	Kershaw, South Carolina
3	April 29–May 1	Mid-Ohio Sports Car Course	Lexington, Ohio
4	April 29–May 1	Mid-Ohio Sports Car Course	Lexington, Ohio
5	May 20–22	Barber Motorsports Park	Birmingham, Alabama
6	May 20–22	Barber Motorsports Park	Birmingham, Alabama
7	June 3–5	Pittsburgh International Race Complex	Wampum, Pennsylvania
8	June 3–5	Pittsburgh International Race Complex	Wampum, Pennsylvania
9	July 8–10	Autobahn Country Club	Joliet, Illinois
10	July 8–10	Autobahn Country Club	Joliet, Illinois
11	August 19–21	Summit Point Motorsports Park	Summit Point, West Virginia
12	August 19–21	Summit Point Motorsports Park	Summit Point, West Virginia
13	October 14–16	Pittsburgh International Race Complex	Wampum, Pennsylvania
14	October 14–16	Pittsburgh International Race Complex	Wampum, Pennsylvania

== Results ==
Round	Circuit	Location	Date	Pole position	Fastest lap	Winning driver
1	Carolina Motorsports Park	Kershaw, South Carolina	April 2	(United States) Austin Hill	(United States) Nathan Byrd	(United States) Austin Hill
2	Carolina Motorsports Park	Kershaw, South Carolina	April 3	(United States) Nathan Byrd	(United States) Nathan Byrd	(United States) Austin Hill
3	Mid-Ohio Sports Car Course	Lexington, Ohio	April 30	(United States) Nathan Byrd	(United States) Michael Varacins	(United States) Michael Varacins
4	Mid-Ohio Sports Car Course	Lexington, Ohio	May 1	(United States) Austin Hill	(United States) Nathan Byrd	(Canada) JC Trahan
5	Barber Motorsports Park	Birmingham, Alabama	May 21	(United States) Nathan Byrd	(United States) Ayrton Houk	(Canada) JC Trahan
6	Barber Motorsports Park	Birmingham, Alabama	May 22	(United States) Ayrton Houk	(United States) Ayrton Houk	(United States) Ayrton Houk
7	Pittsburgh International Race Complex	Wampum, Pennsylvania	June 4	(United States) Nathan Byrd	(United States) Austin Hill	(United States) Nathan Byrd
8	Pittsburgh International Race Complex	Wampum, Pennsylvania	June 5	(Canada) JC Trahan	(Canada) JC Trahan	(Canada) JC Trahan
9	Autobahn Country Club	Joliet, Illinois	July 9	(Canada) JC Trahan	(Canada) JC Trahan	(Canada) JC Trahan
10	Autobahn Country Club	Joliet, Illinois	July 10	(Canada) JC Trahan	(Canada) JC Trahan	(Canada) JC Trahan
11	Summit Point Motorsports Park	Summit Point, West Virginia	August 20	(United States) Tim Minor	(United States) Tim Minor	(United States) Tim Minor
12	Summit Point Motorsports Park	Summit Point, West Virginia	August 21	(United States) Tim Minor	(United States) Tim Minor	(United States) Tim Minor
13	Pittsburgh International Race Complex	Wampum, Pennsylvania	October 15	(Canada) JC Trahan	(Canada) JC Trahan	(Canada) JC Trahan
14	Pittsburgh International Race Complex	Wampum, Pennsylvania	October 16	(Canada) JC Trahan	(Canada) JC Trahan	(Canada) JC Trahan

== Driver Standings ==
Pos	Driver	CMP		MO		BAR		PITT		ABCC		SP		PITT		Pts
1	(Canada) JC Trahan			3	1	1	2	Ret	**1**	**1**	**1**	2	2	**1**	**1**	536
2	(United States) Austin Hill	**1**	1	2	**4**	4	4	2	3	2	Ret	6	5	2	5	477
3	(United States) Robert Wright	DNS	4	11	7	5	5	6	DNS	4	3	4	6	4	3	376
4	(United States) Nathan Byrd	4	DSQ	**4**	2	**3**	3	**1**	4	3	2					360
5	(United States) JT Novosielski	2	2	6	6					5	5			DNF	4	241
6	(United States) Dave Weitzenhof			10	11			7	7	6	4	7	8	7	DNS	236
7	(Greece) Dimitrios Tsesmetzis			13	13	6	6	DNS	11			8	7	10	7	209
8	(United States) Ayrton Houk					2	**1**					5	4			164
9	(United States) Glen Cordova											11	3	3	2	135
10	(United States) Mike Pepitone							8	10			9	12	9	8	134
11	(United States) Andrew Gamble							5	6					5	9	114
12	(United States) David Adorno	3	3	9	9											114
13	(United States) Tim Minor											**1**	**1**			110
14	(United States) Greg Peluso							8	8					8	6	104
15	(United States) Michael Varacins			1	3											89
16	(United States) Dexter Czuba							3	2							79
17	(United States) Amandeep Pothani			12	10							12	11			74
18	(United States) Gabriele Jasper											3	DNF	6	DNF	68
19	(United States) Laura Hayes							4	5							65
20	(United States) Robert Allaer			5	5											62
21	(United States) Dean Kiriluk			7	8											52
22	(United States) Hartley MacDonald			8	9											48
23	(United States) Leslie Walker											10	9			44
24	(United States) John Brumder							10	9							44
25	(United States) Tommy Cadwalder	5	Ret													32
26	(United States) John Dole													DNF	10	22
27	(United States) Paul Farmer										10	DNS				21
28	(United States) Daniel Galiffa								12							17
Pos	Driver	CMP		MO		BAR		PITT		ABCC		SP		PITT		Pts
References: FRP Official Points Standings

Color	Result
Gold	Winner
Silver	2nd-place finish
Bronze	3rd-place finish
Green	Top 5 finish
Light Blue	Top 10 finish
Dark Blue	Other flagged position
Purple	Did not finish
Red	Did not qualify (DNQ)
Brown	Withdrew (Wth)
Black	Disqualified (DSQ)
White	Did Not Start (DNS)
White	Race abandoned (C)
Blank	Did not participate

**In-line notation**
**Bold**	Pole position (3 points)
Italics	Fastest lap of the race (2 points)

== See also ==
- 2022 F1600 Championship Series
