= 2026 The LiUNA! =

NASCAR O'Reilly Auto Parts Series race at Las Vegas Motor Speedway

Race details
- Race 4 of 33 in the 2026 NASCAR O'Reilly Auto Parts Series
- Date: March 14, 2026
- Location: Las Vegas Motor Speedway in Las Vegas, Nevada
- Course: Permanent racing facility
- Course length: 1.5 miles (2.4 km)
- Distance: 200 laps, 300 mi (482.80 km)
- Average speed: 116.820 miles per hour (188.004 km/h)

Pole position
Driver	Sam Mayer	Haas Factory Team
- Time: 29.462

Most laps led
Driver	Justin Allgaier	JR Motorsports
- Laps: 48

Fastest lap
Driver	Sam Mayer	Haas Factory Team
- Time: 30.549

Winner
No. 88	Kyle Larson	JR Motorsports

Television in the United States
- Network: The CW
- Announcers: Adam Alexander, Jamie McMurray, and Parker Kligerman

Radio in the United States
- Radio: PRN
- Booth announcers: Brad Gillie and Mark Garrow
- Turn announcers: Nick Yeoman (1 & 2) and Pat Patterson (3 & 4)

The 2026 The LiUNA! was a NASCAR O'Reilly Auto Parts Series race held on Saturday, March 14, 2026, at Las Vegas Motor Speedway in Las Vegas, Nevada. Contested over 200 laps on the 1.5 mi (2.4 km) asphalt intermediate speedway, it was the fifth race of the 2026 NASCAR O'Reilly Auto Parts Series season, and the 30th running of the event.

In a wild race, Kyle Larson, driving for JR Motorsports, took advantage of a late restart, and led the final 47 laps of the event to earn his 18th career NASCAR O'Reilly Auto Parts Series win, and his first of the season. Justin Allgaier dominated the early stages of the race, winning both stages and led a race-high 48 laps, ending up with a fourth-place finish. Chase Briscoe finished second, and Sheldon Creed finished third. Sammy Smith rounded out the top five, while Jesse Love, Connor Zilisch, Corey Day, William Sawalich, and Austin Hill rounded out the top ten.

== Report ==
=== Background ===
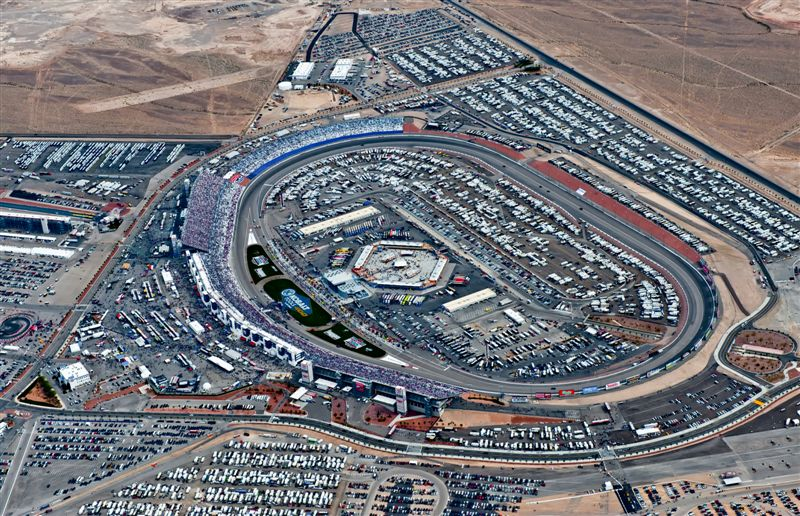
Las Vegas Motor Speedway, the track where the race will be held.

Las Vegas Motor Speedway, located in Clark County, Nevada outside the Las Vegas city limits and about 15 miles northeast of the Las Vegas Strip, is a 1,200-acre (490 ha) complex of multiple tracks for motorsports racing. The complex is owned by Speedway Motorsports, Inc., which is headquartered in Charlotte, North Carolina.

==== Entry list ====
- (R) denotes rookie driver.
- (i) denotes driver who is ineligible for series driver points.

#	Driver	Team	Make
00	Sheldon Creed	Haas Factory Team	Chevrolet
0	Cole Custer (i)	SS-Green Light Racing	Chevrolet
1	Connor Zilisch (i)	JR Motorsports	Chevrolet
02	Ryan Ellis	Young's Motorsports	Chevrolet
2	Jesse Love	Richard Childress Racing	Chevrolet
5	Chandler Smith (i)	Hettinger Racing	Ford
07	Josh Bilicki	SS-Green Light Racing	Chevrolet
7	Justin Allgaier	JR Motorsports	Chevrolet
8	Sammy Smith	JR Motorsports	Chevrolet
9	Carson Kvapil	JR Motorsports	Chevrolet
17	Corey Day	Hendrick Motorsports	Chevrolet
18	William Sawalich	Joe Gibbs Racing	Toyota
19	Chase Briscoe (i)	Joe Gibbs Racing	Toyota
20	Brandon Jones	Joe Gibbs Racing	Toyota
21	Austin Hill	Richard Childress Racing	Chevrolet
24	Harrison Burton	Sam Hunt Racing	Toyota
25	Nick Sanchez	AM Racing	Ford
26	Dean Thompson	Sam Hunt Racing	Toyota
27	Jeb Burton	Jordan Anderson Racing	Chevrolet
28	Kyle Sieg	RSS Racing	Chevrolet
30	Myatt Snider	Barrett–Cope Racing	Chevrolet
31	Blaine Perkins	Jordan Anderson Racing	Chevrolet
32	Rajah Caruth	Jordan Anderson Racing	Chevrolet
35	Chad Finchum	Joey Gase Motorsports	Chevrolet
39	Ryan Sieg	RSS Racing	Chevrolet
41	Sam Mayer	Haas Factory Team	Chevrolet
42	Nathan Byrd	Young's Motorsports	Chevrolet
44	Brennan Poole	Alpha Prime Racing	Chevrolet
45	Lavar Scott (R)	Alpha Prime Racing	Chevrolet
48	Patrick Staropoli (R)	Big Machine Racing	Chevrolet
51	Jeremy Clements	Jeremy Clements Racing	Chevrolet
52	Daniel Dye (i)	AM Racing	Ford
54	Taylor Gray	Joe Gibbs Racing	Toyota
55	Joey Gase	Joey Gase Motorsports	Chevrolet
74	Dawson Cram	Mike Harmon Racing	Chevrolet
87	Austin Green	Peterson Racing	Chevrolet
88	Kyle Larson (i)	JR Motorsports	Chevrolet
91	Mason Maggio	DGM Racing	Chevrolet
92	Josh Williams	DGM Racing	Chevrolet
96	Anthony Alfredo	Viking Motorsports	Chevrolet
99	Parker Retzlaff	Viking Motorsports	Chevrolet
Official entry list

== Practice ==
The first and only practice session was held on Saturday, March 14, at 9:00 AM PST, and lasted for 50 minutes.

Jeremy Clements, driving for his own team, Jeremy Clements Racing, set the fastest time in the session, with a lap of 29.963 seconds, and a speed of 180.222 miles per hour (290.039 km/h).

=== Practice results ===
Pos.	#	Driver	Team	Make	Time	Speed
1	51	Jeremy Clements	Jeremy Clements Racing	Chevrolet	29.963	180.222
2	39	Ryan Sieg	RSS Racing	Chevrolet	30.023	179.862
3	87	Austin Green	Peterson Racing	Chevrolet	30.024	179.856
Full practice results

== Qualifying ==
Qualifying was held on Saturday, March 14, at 10:05 AM PST. Since Las Vegas Motor Speedway is an intermediate racetrack, the qualifying procedure used was a single-car, one-lap system with one round. Drivers were on track by themselves and had one lap to post a qualifying time, and whoever set the fastest time won the pole.

Sam Mayer, driving for Haas Factory Team, qualified on pole position with a lap of 29.462 seconds, and a speed of 183.287 miles per hour (294.972 km/h).

Three drivers failed to qualify: Myatt Snider, Chad Finchum, and Dawson Cram.

=== Qualifying results ===
Pos.	#	Driver	Team	Make	Time	Speed
1	41	Sam Mayer	Haas Factory Team	Chevrolet	29.462	183.287
2	88	Kyle Larson (i)	JR Motorsports	Chevrolet	29.524	182.902
3	00	Sheldon Creed	Haas Factory Team	Chevrolet	29.569	182.624
4	8	Sammy Smith	JR Motorsports	Chevrolet	29.623	182.291
5	20	Brandon Jones	Joe Gibbs Racing	Toyota	29.647	182.143
6	54	Taylor Gray	Joe Gibbs Racing	Toyota	29.687	181.898
7	2	Jesse Love	Richard Childress Racing	Chevrolet	29.718	181.708
8	32	Rajah Caruth	Jordan Anderson Racing	Chevrolet	29.720	181.696
9	7	Justin Allgaier	JR Motorsports	Chevrolet	29.773	181.372
10	51	Jeremy Clements	Jeremy Clements Racing	Chevrolet	29.793	181.251
11	17	Corey Day	Hendrick Motorsports	Chevrolet	29.816	181.111
12	99	Parker Retzlaff	Viking Motorsports	Chevrolet	29.830	181.026
13	21	Austin Hill	Richard Childress Racing	Chevrolet	29.906	180.566
14	18	William Sawalich	Joe Gibbs Racing	Toyota	29.956	180.264
15	27	Jeb Burton	Jordan Anderson Racing	Chevrolet	29.981	180.114
16	0	Cole Custer (i)	SS-Green Light Racing	Chevrolet	29.994	180.036
17	1	Connor Zilisch (i)	JR Motorsports	Chevrolet	30.016	179.904
18	9	Carson Kvapil	JR Motorsports	Chevrolet	30.021	179.874
19	87	Austin Green	Peterson Racing	Chevrolet	30.043	179.742
20	39	Ryan Sieg	RSS Racing	Chevrolet	30.065	179.611
21	25	Nick Sanchez	AM Racing	Ford	30.067	179.599
22	48	Patrick Staropoli (R)	Big Machine Racing	Chevrolet	30.083	179.503
23	19	Chase Briscoe (i)	Joe Gibbs Racing	Toyota	30.098	179.414
24	24	Harrison Burton	Sam Hunt Racing	Toyota	30.112	179.330
25	26	Dean Thompson	Sam Hunt Racing	Toyota	30.163	179.027
26	44	Brennan Poole	Alpha Prime Racing	Chevrolet	30.203	178.790
27	52	Daniel Dye (i)	AM Racing	Ford	30.209	178.755
28	5	Chandler Smith (i)	Hettinger Racing	Ford	30.234	178.607
29	28	Kyle Sieg	RSS Racing	Chevrolet	30.340	177.983
30	45	Lavar Scott (R)	Alpha Prime Racing	Chevrolet	30.410	177.573
31	96	Anthony Alfredo	Viking Motorsports	Chevrolet	30.490	177.107
32	92	Josh Williams	DGM Racing	Chevrolet	30.504	177.026
Qualified by owner's points
33	31	Blaine Perkins	Jordan Anderson Racing	Chevrolet	30.554	176.736
34	42	Nathan Byrd	Young's Motorsports	Chevrolet	30.673	176.051
35	02	Ryan Ellis	Young's Motorsports	Chevrolet	30.824	175.188
36	55	Joey Gase	Joey Gase Motorsports	Chevrolet	30.827	175.171
37	91	Mason Maggio	DGM Racing	Chevrolet	30.851	175.035
38	07	Josh Bilicki	SS-Green Light Racing	Chevrolet	31.053	173.896
Failed to qualify
39	30	Myatt Snider	Barrett–Cope Racing	Chevrolet	30.978	174.317
40	35	Chad Finchum	Joey Gase Motorsports	Chevrolet	31.161	173.294
41	74	Dawson Cram	Mike Harmon Racing	Chevrolet	—	—
Official qualifying results
Official starting lineup

== Race ==
=== Race results ===
==== Stage results ====
Stage One Laps: 45

Pos.	#	Driver	Team	Make	Pts
1	7	Justin Allgaier	JR Motorsports	Chevrolet	10
2	41	Sam Mayer	Haas Factory Team	Chevrolet	9
3	19	Chase Briscoe (i)	Joe Gibbs Racing	Toyota	0
4	54	Taylor Gray	Joe Gibbs Racing	Toyota	7
5	00	Sheldon Creed	Haas Factory Team	Chevrolet	6
6	2	Jesse Love	Richard Childress Racing	Chevrolet	5
7	88	Kyle Larson (i)	JR Motorsports	Chevrolet	0
8	17	Corey Day	Hendrick Motorsports	Chevrolet	3
9	0	Cole Custer (i)	SS-Green Light Racing	Chevrolet	0
10	20	Brandon Jones	Joe Gibbs Racing	Toyota	1

Stage Two Laps: 45

Pos.	#	Driver	Team	Make	Pts
1	7	Justin Allgaier	JR Motorsports	Chevrolet	10
2	19	Chase Briscoe (i)	Joe Gibbs Racing	Toyota	0
3	54	Taylor Gray	Joe Gibbs Racing	Toyota	8
4	2	Jesse Love	Richard Childress Racing	Chevrolet	7
5	88	Kyle Larson (i)	JR Motorsports	Chevrolet	0
6	00	Sheldon Creed	Haas Factory Team	Chevrolet	5
7	17	Corey Day	Hendrick Motorsports	Chevrolet	4
8	1	Connor Zilisch (i)	JR Motorsports	Chevrolet	0
9	21	Austin Hill	Richard Childress Racing	Chevrolet	2
10	9	Carson Kvapil	JR Motorsports	Chevrolet	1

=== Final Stage results ===
Stage Three Laps: 110

Fin	St	#	Driver	Team	Make	Laps	Led	Status	Pts
1	2	88	Kyle Larson (i)	JR Motorsports	Chevrolet	200	47	Running	0
2	23	19	Chase Briscoe (i)	Joe Gibbs Racing	Toyota	200	2	Running	0
3	3	00	Sheldon Creed	Haas Factory Team	Chevrolet	200	1	Running	45
4	9	7	Justin Allgaier	JR Motorsports	Chevrolet	200	48	Running	53
5	4	8	Sammy Smith	JR Motorsports	Chevrolet	200	0	Running	32
6	7	2	Jesse Love	Richard Childress Racing	Chevrolet	200	36	Running	43
7	17	1	Connor Zilisch (i)	JR Motorsports	Chevrolet	200	0	Running	0
8	11	17	Corey Day	Hendrick Motorsports	Chevrolet	200	9	Running	36
9	14	18	William Sawalich	Joe Gibbs Racing	Toyota	200	0	Running	28
10	13	21	Austin Hill	Richard Childress Racing	Chevrolet	200	0	Running	29
11	18	9	Carson Kvapil	JR Motorsports	Chevrolet	200	0	Running	27
12	12	99	Parker Retzlaff	Viking Motorsports	Chevrolet	200	0	Running	25
13	5	20	Brandon Jones	Joe Gibbs Racing	Toyota	200	4	Running	25
14	29	28	Kyle Sieg	RSS Racing	Chevrolet	200	0	Running	23
15	27	52	Daniel Dye (i)	AM Racing	Ford	200	0	Running	0
16	32	92	Josh Williams	DGM Racing	Chevrolet	200	0	Running	21
17	24	24	Harrison Burton	Sam Hunt Racing	Toyota	200	0	Running	20
18	16	0	Cole Custer (i)	SS-Green Light Racing	Chevrolet	200	0	Running	0
19	8	32	Rajah Caruth	Jordan Anderson Racing	Chevrolet	200	0	Running	18
20	26	44	Brennan Poole	Alpha Prime Racing	Chevrolet	199	0	Running	17
21	22	48	Patrick Staropoli (R)	Big Machine Racing	Chevrolet	199	0	Running	16
22	33	31	Blaine Perkins	Jordan Anderson Racing	Chevrolet	199	0	Running	15
23	38	07	Josh Bilicki	SS-Green Light Racing	Chevrolet	199	0	Running	14
24	10	51	Jeremy Clements	Jeremy Clements Racing	Chevrolet	199	0	Running	13
25	19	87	Austin Green	Peterson Racing	Chevrolet	199	0	Running	12
26	30	45	Lavar Scott (R)	Alpha Prime Racing	Chevrolet	199	0	Running	11
27	15	27	Jeb Burton	Jordan Anderson Racing	Chevrolet	199	0	Running	10
28	37	91	Mason Maggio	DGM Racing	Chevrolet	199	0	Running	9
29	36	55	Joey Gase	Joey Gase Motorsports	Chevrolet	199	0	Running	8
30	35	02	Ryan Ellis	Young's Motorsports	Chevrolet	198	0	Running	7
31	25	26	Dean Thompson	Sam Hunt Racing	Toyota	198	0	Running	6
32	34	42	Nathan Byrd	Young's Motorsports	Chevrolet	198	0	Running	5
33	20	39	Ryan Sieg	RSS Racing	Chevrolet	197	0	Running	4
34	31	96	Anthony Alfredo	Young's Motorsports	Chevrolet	197	0	Running	3
35	1	41	Sam Mayer	Haas Factory Team	Chevrolet	196	32	Running	12
36	28	5	Chandler Smith (i)	Hettinger Racing	Ford	184	0	Ignition	0
37	6	54	Taylor Gray	Joe Gibbs Racing	Toyota	148	21	Accident	16
38	21	25	Nick Sanchez	AM Racing	Ford	141	0	Fuel Pump	1
Official race results

=== Race statistics ===
- Lead changes: 16 among 9 different drivers
- Cautions/Laps: 8 for 42 laps
- Red flags: 0
- Time of race: 2 hours, 34 minutes and 5 seconds
- Average speed: 116.820 miles per hour (188.004 km/h)

== Standings after the race ==
Drivers' Championship standings

	Pos	Driver	Points
	1	Justin Allgaier	237
	2	Jesse Love	224 (–13)
	3	Austin Hill	208 (–29)
1	4	Sheldon Creed	188 (–49)
1	5	Carson Kvapil	173 (–64)
	6	Sammy Smith	164 (–73)
1	7	Corey Day	154 (–83)
1	8	Rajah Caruth	137 (–100)
1	9	Parker Retzlaff	129 (–108)
1	10	Sam Mayer	122 (–115)
	11	Brandon Jones	120 (–117)
1	12	Taylor Gray	110 (–127)
Official driver's standings

Manufacturers' Championship standings

Pos	Manufacturer	Points
1	Chevrolet	275
2	Toyota	127 (–148)
3	Ford	101 (–174)

- Note: Only the first 12 positions are included for the driver standings.

Previous race: 2026 GOVX 200	NASCAR O'Reilly Auto Parts Series; 2026 season	Next race: 2026 Sport Clips Haircuts VFW 200
