= Barrett–Cope Racing =

NASCAR team

- Owner(s): Stanton Barrett; Derrike Cope
- Base: Thomasville, North Carolina
- Series: NASCAR O'Reilly Auto Parts Series
- Race drivers: 30. Carson Ware, Cody Ware, Baltazar Leguizamón, Austin J. Hill, Myatt Snider, Stanton Barrett (part-time)
- Manufacturer: Chevrolet
- Opened: 2026
- Closed: 2026

Career
- Races competed: 6
- Drivers' Championships: 0
- Race victories: 0
- Pole positions: 0

Barrett–Cope Racing was an American professional stock car racing team that competed in the NASCAR O'Reilly Auto Parts Series, fielding the No. 30 Chevrolet Camaro on a part-time basis for multiple drivers.

The team was owned by driver, Hollywood stuntman Stanton Barrett and fielded in a partnership with Cope Family Racing, owned by former NASCAR driver and 1990 Daytona 500 winner Derrike Cope.

== O'Reilly Auto Parts Series ==
=== Car No. 30 history ===
After having last fielded a team in what was then the Nationwide Series in 2008, Stanton Barrett returned to team ownership in the series, now the O'Reilly Auto Parts Series, eighteen years later in 2026 when he partnered with Cope Family Racing and their No. 70 car from 2025 was renumbered to the No. 30. Cope had brought back his team in what was then the Xfinity Series in 2025 after having last competed in the series in 2016.

On January 5, 2026, Argentinian Baltazar Leguizamón was announced as the team's first driver. He will share the car with Stanton Barrett, as well as a rotating seat of drivers that are to be announced throughout the season. Leguizamón will drive the No. 30 car at COTA, the spring Martinsville race, and at Watkins Glen. Carson Ware joined the team to compete part-time in the NASCAR O'Reilly Auto Parts Series. He made his debut at Daytona Speedway in the season opener, finishing 19th, which marked a career-best result across NASCAR’s three national touring series. The entry list for the 2026 Bennett Transportation & Logistics 250 at Echopark Speedway revealed that Carson's brother Cody Ware would be driving the No. 30, making his first O'Reilly Series start since 2021. Austin J. Hill would drive the No. 30 at Phoenix. Myatt Snider took over the No. 30 for the next three races, he failed to qualify at Las Vegas, finished 33rd at Darlington, and finished 19th at Martinsville.

==== Car No. 30 results ====
Year	Driver	No.	Make	1	2	3	4	5	6	7	8	9	10	11	12	13	14	15	16	17	18	19	20	21	22	23	24	25	26	27	28	29	30	31	32	33	Owners	Pts
2026	Carson Ware	30	Chevy	DAY; 19																																		
2026	Cody Ware	30	Chevy		ATL; 31																																	
2026	Baltazar Leguizamón	30	Chevy			COA; 37																																
2026	Austin J. Hill	30	Chevy				PHO; 34																															
2026	Myatt Snider	30	Chevy					LVS; DNQ	DAR; 33	MAR; 19	CAR	BRI	KAN	TAL	TEX	GLN	DOV	CLT	NSH	POC	COR	SON	CHI	ATL	IND	IOW	DAY	DAR	GTW	BRI	LVS	CLT	PHO	TAL	MAR	HOM		
