= 2026 NFPA 250 =

NASCAR O'Reilly Auto Parts Series race at Martinsville Speedway

Race details
- Race 7 of 33 in the 2026 NASCAR O'Reilly Auto Parts Series
- Date: March 28, 2026
- Location: Martinsville Speedway in Ridgeway, Virginia
- Course: Permanent racing facility
- Course length: 0.526 miles (0.847 km)
- Distance: 250 laps, 131.5 mi (211.628 km)
- Average speed: 55.015 mph (88.538 km/h)

Pole position
Driver	Justin Allgaier	JR Motorsports
- Grid positions set by competition-based formula

Most laps led
Driver	Justin Allgaier	JR Motorsports
- Laps: 114

Fastest lap
Driver	Justin Allgaier	JR Motorsports
- Time: 20.491

Winner
No. 7	Justin Allgaier	JR Motorsports

Television in the United States
- Network: The CW
- Announcers: Adam Alexander, Jamie McMurray, and Parker Kligerman

Radio in the United States
- Radio: MRN
- Booth announcers: Alex Hayden, Mike Bagley, and Ryan Preece
- Turn announcers: Dave Moody (1 & 2) and Tim Catafalmo (3 & 4)

The 2026 NFPA 250 was a NASCAR O'Reilly Auto Parts Series race held on Saturday, March 28, 2026, at Martinsville Speedway in Ridgeway, Virginia. Contested over 250 laps on the 0.526-mile (0.847 km) paperclip-shaped oval, it was the seventh race of the 2026 NASCAR O'Reilly Auto Parts Series season, and the sixth running of the event.

Justin Allgaier, driving for JR Motorsports, survived late chaos in the final stage which resulted in numerous cautions, and pulled away on the final restart to earn his 31st career NASCAR O'Reilly Auto Parts Series win, his third of the season, and his second consecutive win. Allgaier proceeded to dominate the race as well, winning the first stage and led a race-high 114 laps from the pole position. Corey Day finished second, and Sammy Smith finished third. Sheldon Creed and Lee Pulliam (in his series debut) rounded out the top five, while Austin Hill, Dean Thompson, Ross Chastain, Ryan Sieg, and Brent Crews rounded out the top ten.

== Report ==
=== Background ===
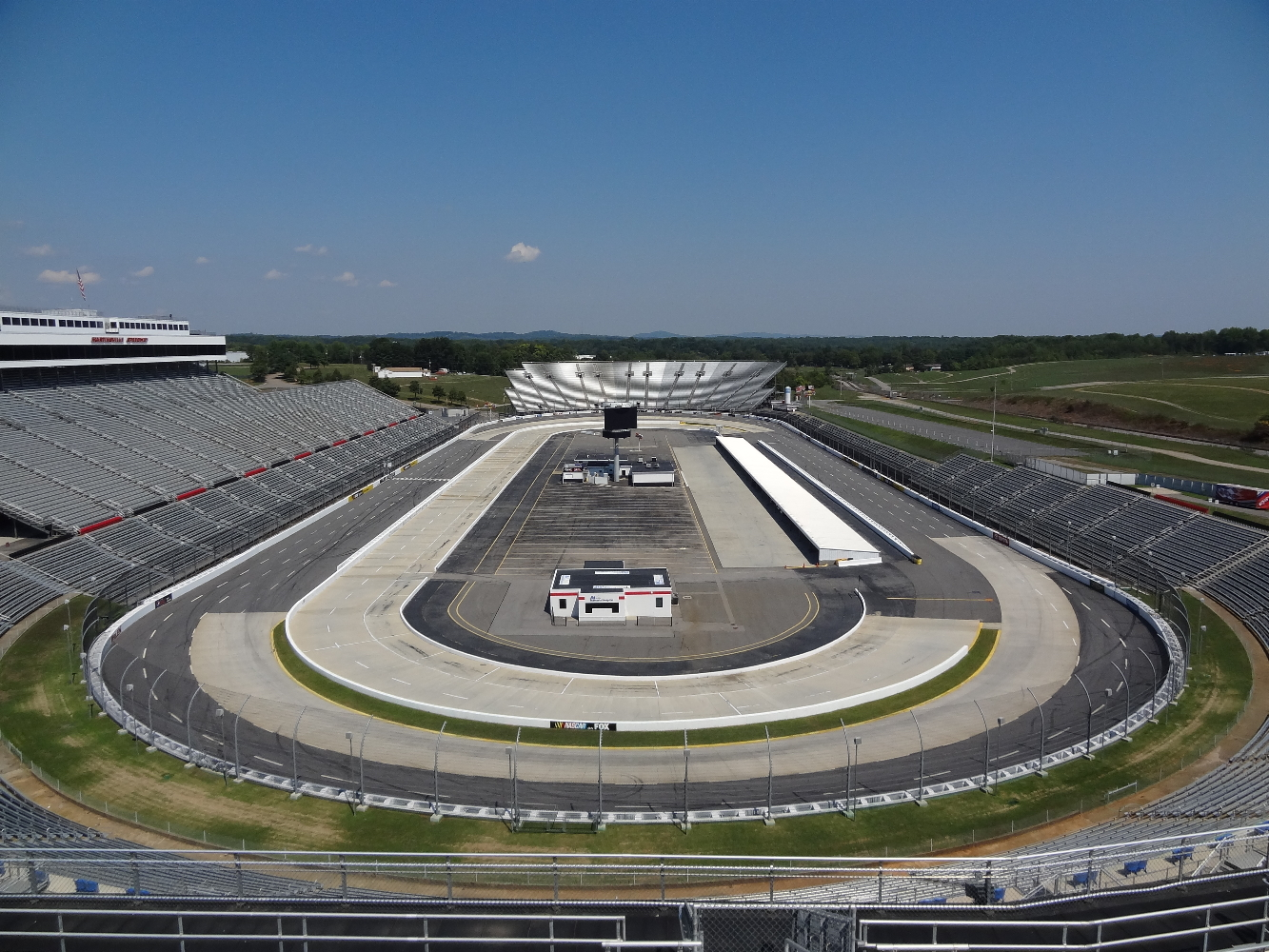
Martinsville Speedway, the track where the race was held.

Martinsville Speedway is a NASCAR-owned stock car racing track located in Henry County, in Ridgeway, Virginia, just to the south of Martinsville. At 0.526 miles (0.847 km) in length, it is the shortest track in the NASCAR Cup Series. The track was also one of the first paved oval tracks in NASCAR, being built in 1947 by H. Clay Earles. It is also the only remaining race track on the NASCAR circuit since its beginning in 1948.

The National Fire Protection Association was announced as the title sponsor on January 8.

==== Entry list ====
- (R) denotes rookie driver.
- (i) denotes driver who is ineligible for series driver points.

#	Driver	Team	Make
00	Sheldon Creed	Haas Factory Team	Chevrolet
0	Garrett Smithley	SS-Green Light Racing	Chevrolet
1	Carson Kvapil	JR Motorsports	Chevrolet
02	Ryan Ellis	Young's Motorsports	Chevrolet
2	Jesse Love	Richard Childress Racing	Chevrolet
5	Luke Baldwin (i)	Hettinger Racing	Ford
07	Josh Bilicki	SS-Green Light Racing	Chevrolet
7	Justin Allgaier	JR Motorsports	Chevrolet
8	Sammy Smith	JR Motorsports	Chevrolet
9	Lee Pulliam	JR Motorsports	Chevrolet
17	Corey Day	Hendrick Motorsports	Chevrolet
18	William Sawalich	Joe Gibbs Racing	Toyota
19	Brent Crews (R)	Joe Gibbs Racing	Toyota
20	Brandon Jones	Joe Gibbs Racing	Toyota
21	Austin Hill	Richard Childress Racing	Chevrolet
24	Harrison Burton	Sam Hunt Racing	Toyota
25	Nick Sanchez	AM Racing	Ford
26	Dean Thompson	Sam Hunt Racing	Toyota
27	Jeb Burton	Jordan Anderson Racing	Chevrolet
28	Kyle Sieg	RSS Racing	Chevrolet
30	Myatt Snider	Barrett–Cope Racing	Chevrolet
31	Blaine Perkins	Jordan Anderson Racing	Chevrolet
32	Andrew Patterson	Jordan Anderson Racing	Chevrolet
35	Justin Carroll (i)	Joey Gase Motorsports	Chevrolet
39	Ryan Sieg	RSS Racing	Chevrolet
41	Sam Mayer	Haas Factory Team	Chevrolet
42	Brad Perez	Young's Motorsports	Chevrolet
44	Brennan Poole	Alpha Prime Racing	Chevrolet
45	Lavar Scott (R)	Alpha Prime Racing	Chevrolet
48	Patrick Staropoli (R)	Big Machine Racing	Chevrolet
51	Jeremy Clements	Jeremy Clements Racing	Chevrolet
54	Taylor Gray	Joe Gibbs Racing	Toyota
55	Joey Gase	Joey Gase Motorsports	Chevrolet
74	Dawson Cram	Mike Harmon Racing	Chevrolet
87	Austin Green	Peterson Racing	Chevrolet
88	Rajah Caruth	JR Motorsports	Chevrolet
91	Ross Chastain (i)	DGM Racing	Chevrolet
92	Josh Williams	DGM Racing	Chevrolet
96	Anthony Alfredo	Viking Motorsports	Chevrolet
99	Parker Retzlaff	Viking Motorsports	Chevrolet
Official entry list

== Practice ==
The first and only practice session was held on Friday, March 27, at 4:20 PM EST, and would last for 50 minutes.

Lee Pulliam, driving for JR Motorsports, set the fastest time in the session, with a lap of 20.364 seconds, and a speed of 92.988 miles per hour (149.650 km/h).

=== Practice results ===
Pos.	#	Driver	Team	Make	Time	Speed
1	9	Lee Pulliam	JR Motorsports	Chevrolet	20.364	92.988
2	92	Josh Williams	DGM Racing	Chevrolet	20.464	92.533
3	02	Ryan Ellis	Young's Motorsports	Chevrolet	20.465	92.529
Full practice results

== Starting lineup ==
Qualifying was originally scheduled to be held on Friday, March 27, at 5:35 PM EST, but after six cars took their laps, the rest of the session was cancelled due to inclement weather. Justin Allgaier, driving for JR Motorsports, was awarded the pole position as a result of NASCAR's pandemic formula with a score of 1.000.

Two drivers failed to qualify: Dawson Cram and Justin Carroll.

Pos.	#	Driver	Team	Make
1	7	Justin Allgaier	JR Motorsports	Chevrolet
2	88	Rajah Caruth	JR Motorsports	Chevrolet
3	20	Brandon Jones	Joe Gibbs Racing	Toyota
4	19	Brent Crews (R)	Joe Gibbs Racing	Toyota
5	1	Carson Kvapil	JR Motorsports	Chevrolet
6	00	Sheldon Creed	Haas Factory Team	Chevrolet
7	17	Corey Day	Hendrick Motorsports	Chevrolet
8	2	Jesse Love	Richard Childress Racing	Chevrolet
9	8	Sammy Smith	JR Motorsports	Chevrolet
10	99	Parker Retzlaff	Viking Motorsports	Chevrolet
11	41	Sam Mayer	Haas Factory Team	Chevrolet
12	9	Lee Pulliam	JR Motorsports	Chevrolet
13	54	Taylor Gray	Joe Gibbs Racing	Toyota
14	39	Ryan Sieg	RSS Racing	Chevrolet
15	96	Anthony Alfredo	Viking Motorsports	Chevrolet
16	18	William Sawalich	Joe Gibbs Racing	Toyota
17	44	Brennan Poole	Alpha Prime Racing	Chevrolet
18	25	Nick Sanchez	AM Racing	Ford
19	32	Andrew Patterson	Jordan Anderson Racing	Chevrolet
20	51	Jeremy Clements	Jeremy Clements Racing	Chevrolet
21	07	Josh Bilicki	SS-Green Light Racing	Chevrolet
22	26	Dean Thompson	Sam Hunt Racing	Toyota
23	27	Jeb Burton	Jordan Anderson Racing	Chevrolet
24	24	Harrison Burton	Sam Hunt Racing	Toyota
25	0	Garrett Smithley	SS-Green Light Racing	Chevrolet
26	21	Austin Hill	Richard Childress Racing	Chevrolet
27	48	Patrick Staropoli (R)	Big Machine Racing	Chevrolet
28	31	Blaine Perkins	Jordan Anderson Racing	Chevrolet
29	5	Luke Baldwin (i)	Hettinger Racing	Ford
30	87	Austin Green	Peterson Racing	Chevrolet
31	92	Josh Williams	DGM Racing	Chevrolet
32	02	Ryan Ellis	Young's Motorsports	Chevrolet
Qualified by owner's points
33	55	Joey Gase	Joey Gase Motorsports	Chevrolet
34	42	Brad Perez	Young's Motorsports	Chevrolet
35	28	Kyle Sieg	RSS Racing	Chevrolet
36	45	Lavar Scott (R)	Alpha Prime Racing	Chevrolet
37	30	Myatt Snider	Barrett–Cope Racing	Chevrolet
38	91	Ross Chastain (i)	DGM Racing	Chevrolet
Failed to qualify
39	74	Dawson Cram	Mike Harmon Racing	Chevrolet
40	35	Justin Carroll (i)	Joey Gase Motorsports	Chevrolet
Official starting lineup

== Race ==
=== Race results ===
==== Stage results ====
Stage One Laps: 60

Pos.	#	Driver	Team	Make	Pts
1	7	Justin Allgaier	JR Motorsports	Chevrolet	10
2	20	Brandon Jones	Joe Gibbs Racing	Toyota	9
3	88	Rajah Caruth	JR Motorsports	Chevrolet	8
4	19	Brent Crews (R)	Joe Gibbs Racing	Toyota	7
5	00	Sheldon Creed	Haas Factory Team	Chevrolet	6
6	8	Sammy Smith	JR Motorsports	Chevrolet	5
7	96	Anthony Alfredo	Viking Motorsports	Chevrolet	4
8	1	Carson Kvapil	JR Motorsports	Chevrolet	3
9	2	Jesse Love	Richard Childress Racing	Chevrolet	2
10	18	William Sawalich	Joe Gibbs Racing	Toyota	1

Stage Two Laps: 60

Pos.	#	Driver	Team	Make	Pts
1	21	Austin Hill	Richard Childress Racing	Chevrolet	10
2	41	Sam Mayer	Haas Factory Team	Chevrolet	9
3	54	Taylor Gray	Joe Gibbs Racing	Toyota	8
4	39	Ryan Sieg	RSS Racing	Chevrolet	7
5	18	William Sawalich	Joe Gibbs Racing	Toyota	6
6	96	Anthony Alfredo	Viking Motorsports	Chevrolet	5
7	88	Rajah Caruth	JR Motorsports	Chevrolet	4
8	24	Harrison Burton	Sam Hunt Racing	Toyota	3
9	17	Corey Day	Hendrick Motorsports	Chevrolet	2
10	7	Justin Allgaier	JR Motorsports	Chevrolet	1

=== Final Stage results ===
Stage Three Laps: 130

Fin	St	#	Driver	Team	Make	Laps	Led	Status	Pts
1	1	7	Justin Allgaier	JR Motorsports	Chevrolet	250	114	Running	67
2	7	17	Corey Day	Hendrick Motorsports	Chevrolet	250	37	Running	37
3	9	8	Sammy Smith	JR Motorsports	Chevrolet	250	0	Running	39
4	6	00	Sheldon Creed	Haas Factory Team	Chevrolet	250	0	Running	39
5	12	9	Lee Pulliam	JR Motorsports	Chevrolet	250	40	Running	32
6	26	21	Austin Hill	Richard Childress Racing	Chevrolet	250	9	Running	41
7	22	26	Dean Thompson	Sam Hunt Racing	Toyota	250	0	Running	30
8	38	91	Ross Chastain (i)	DGM Racing	Chevrolet	250	0	Running	0
9	14	39	Ryan Sieg	RSS Racing	Chevrolet	250	0	Running	35
10	4	19	Brent Crews (R)	Joe Gibbs Racing	Toyota	250	0	Running	34
11	10	99	Parker Retzlaff	Viking Motorsports	Chevrolet	250	0	Running	26
12	8	2	Jesse Love	Richard Childress Racing	Chevrolet	250	0	Running	27
13	13	54	Taylor Gray	Joe Gibbs Racing	Toyota	250	0	Running	32
14	17	44	Brennan Poole	Alpha Prime Racing	Chevrolet	250	0	Running	23
15	15	96	Anthony Alfredo	Viking Motorsports	Chevrolet	250	0	Running	31
16	27	48	Patrick Staropoli (R)	Big Machine Racing	Chevrolet	250	0	Running	21
17	28	31	Blaine Perkins	Jordan Anderson Racing	Chevrolet	250	0	Running	20
18	3	20	Brandon Jones	Joe Gibbs Racing	Toyota	250	1	Running	28
19	37	30	Myatt Snider	Barrett–Cope Racing	Chevrolet	250	0	Running	18
20	16	18	William Sawalich	Joe Gibbs Racing	Toyota	250	0	Running	24
21	34	42	Brad Perez	Young's Motorsports	Chevrolet	250	0	Running	16
22	36	45	Lavar Scott (R)	Alpha Prime Racing	Chevrolet	250	0	Running	15
23	11	41	Sam Mayer	Haas Factory Team	Chevrolet	250	14	Running	23
24	33	55	Joey Gase	Joey Gase Motorsports	Chevrolet	250	0	Running	13
25	2	88	Rajah Caruth	JR Motorsports	Chevrolet	250	18	Running	24
26	24	24	Harrison Burton	Sam Hunt Racing	Toyota	248	17	Running	14
27	25	0	Garrett Smithley	SS-Green Light Racing	Chevrolet	242	0	Running	10
28	5	1	Carson Kvapil	JR Motorsports	Chevrolet	234	0	Accident	12
29	30	87	Austin Green	Peterson Racing	Chevrolet	233	0	Accident	8
30	23	27	Jeb Burton	Jordan Anderson Racing	Chevrolet	233	0	Accident	7
31	19	32	Andrew Patterson	Jordan Anderson Racing	Chevrolet	233	0	Accident	6
32	31	92	Josh Williams	DGM Racing	Chevrolet	233	0	Accident	5
33	18	25	Nick Sanchez	AM Racing	Ford	213	0	Accident	4
34	35	28	Kyle Sieg	RSS Racing	Chevrolet	207	0	Suspension	3
35	21	07	Josh Bilicki	SS-Green Light Racing	Chevrolet	205	0	Running	2
36	32	02	Ryan Ellis	Young's Motorsports	Chevrolet	183	0	Brakes	1
37	20	51	Jeremy Clements	Jeremy Clements Racing	Chevrolet	89	0	Oil Cooler	1
38	29	5	Luke Baldwin (i)	Hettinger Racing	Ford	31	0	Accident	0
Official race results

=== Race statistics ===
- Lead changes: 14 among 8 different drivers
- Cautions/Laps: 14 for 97 laps
- Red flags: 1
- Time of race: 2 hours, 23 minutes and 25 seconds
- Average speed: 55.015 miles per hour (88.538 km/h)

== Standings after the race ==
Drivers' Championship standings

	Pos	Driver	Points
	1	Justin Allgaier	373
	2	Jesse Love	281 (–92)
1	3	Sheldon Creed	257 (–116)
1	4	Austin Hill	251 (–122)
2	5	Carson Kvapil	234 (–139)
	6	Sammy Smith	231 (–142)
	7	Corey Day	225 (–148)
	8	Brandon Jones	198 (–175)
	9	Parker Retzlaff	195 (–178)
	10	Rajah Caruth	175 (–198)
	11	Sam Mayer	172 (–201)
	12	Taylor Gray	164 (–209)
Official driver's standings

Manufacturers' Championship standings

Pos	Manufacturer	Points
1	Chevrolet	385
2	Toyota	192 (–193)
3	Ford	126 (–259)

- Note: Only the first 12 positions are included for the driver standings.

Previous race: 2026 Sport Clips Haircuts VFW 200	NASCAR O'Reilly Auto Parts Series; 2026 season	Next race: 2026 North Carolina Education Lottery 250
