= Nathan Byrd =

American racing driver (born 2000)

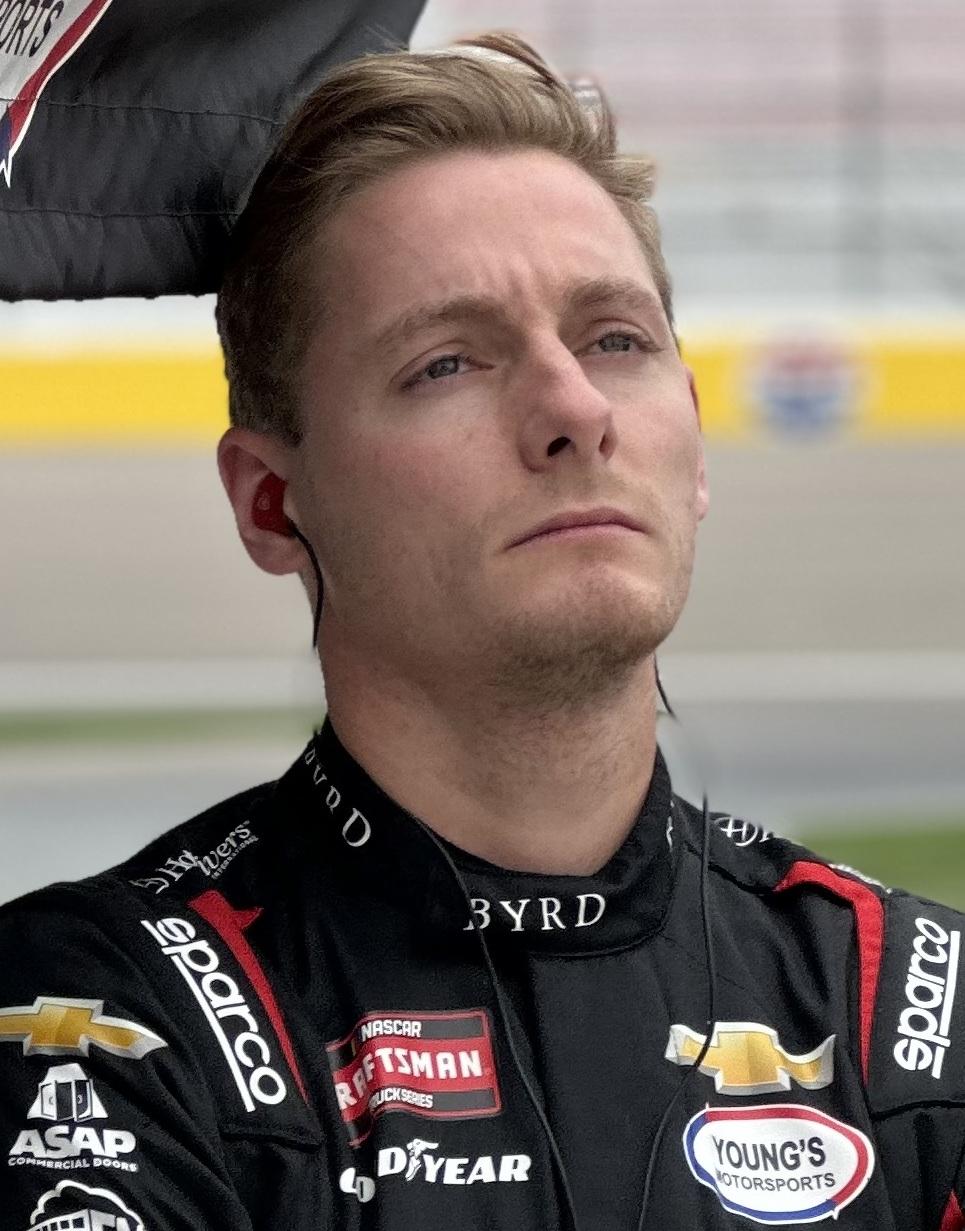
- Byrd at Las Vegas Motor Speedway in 2025
- Born: Nathan Joseph Byrd; January 6, 2000 (age 26); Litchfield Park, Arizona, U.S.
- Achievements: 2022 North American Formula 1000 Champion

NASCAR O'Reilly Auto Parts Series career
- 12 races run over 2 years
- 2026 position: 38th
- Best finish: 38th (2026)
- First race: 2024 Pacific Office Automation 147 (Portland)
- Last race: 2026 Hy-Vee PERKS 250 (Iowa)
Wins	Top tens	Poles
0	0	0

NASCAR FedEx Freight Truck Series career
- 18 races run over 2 years
- 2025 position: 28th
- Best finish: 28th (2025)
- First race: 2024 Kubota Tractor 200 (Kansas)
- Last race: 2025 NASCAR Craftsman Truck Series Championship Race (Phoenix)
Wins	Top tens	Poles
0	0	0
- Statistics up to date as of November 7, 2026.

Nathan Joseph Byrd (born January 6, 2000) is an American professional stock car racing driver. He last competed part-time in the NASCAR O'Reilly Auto Parts Series, driving the No. 42 Chevrolet Camaro SS for Young's Motorsports. He has previously competed in the NASCAR Craftsman Truck Series.

== Racing career ==
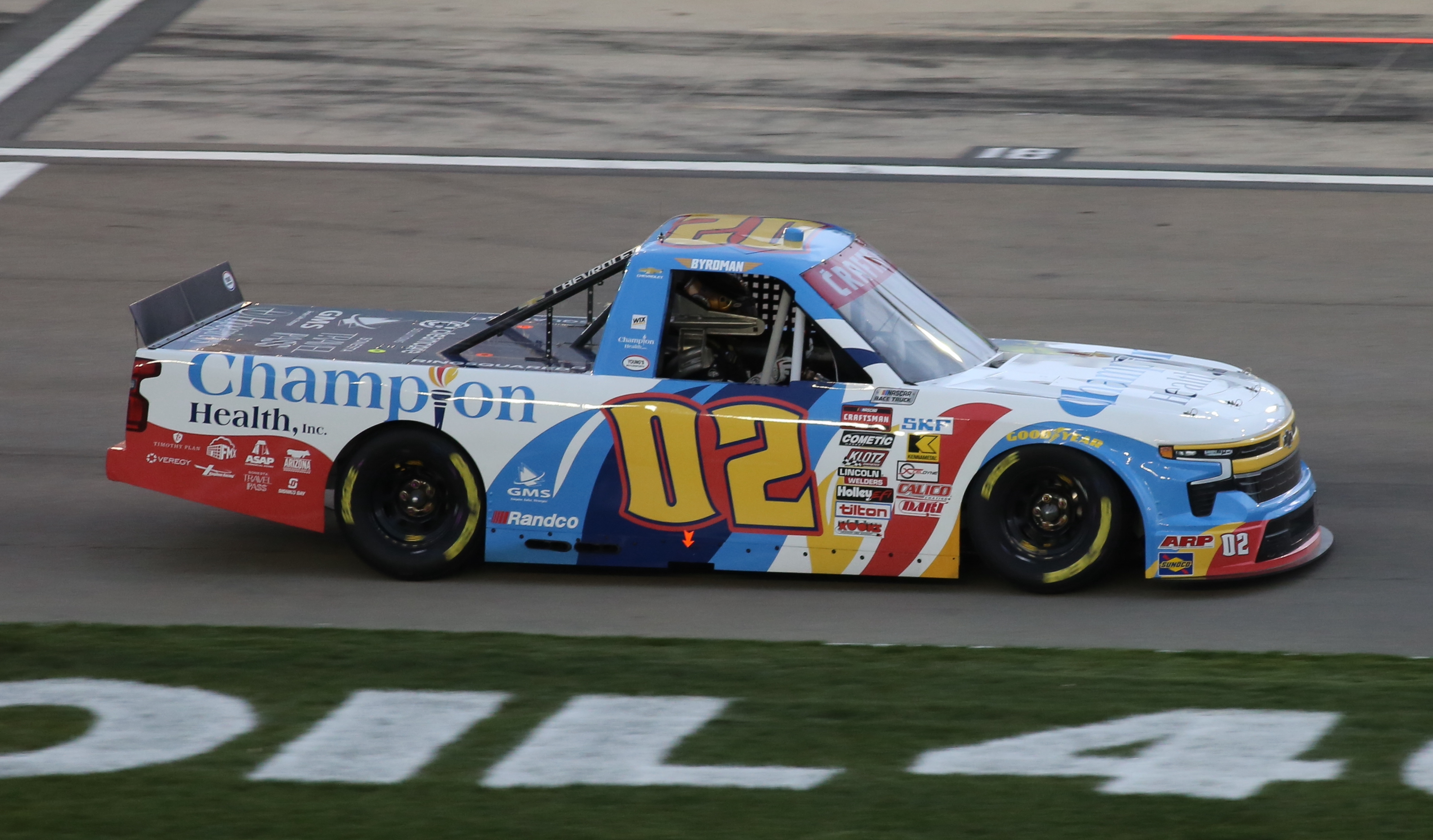
Byrd's No. 02 truck at Las Vegas Motor Speedway in 2025

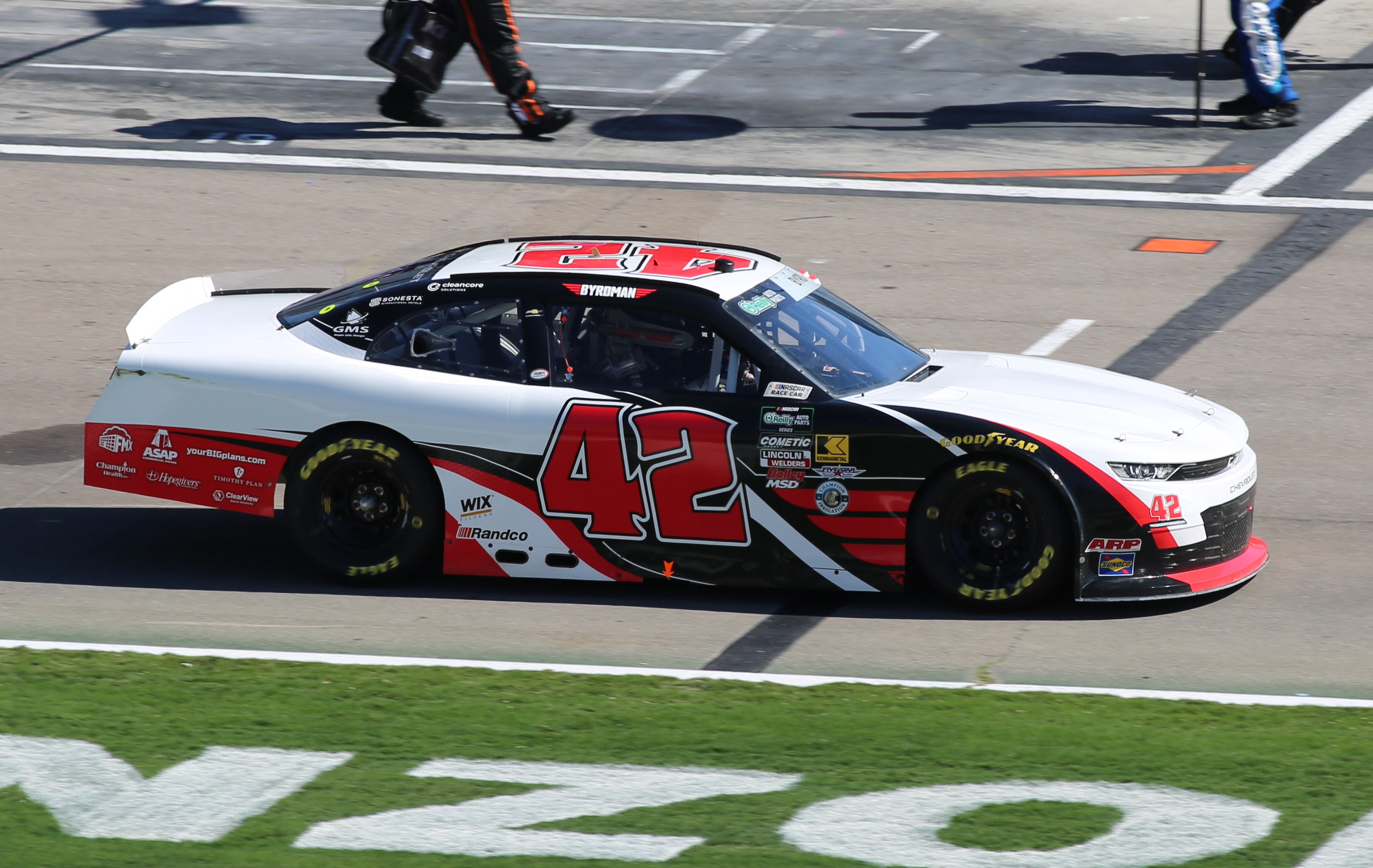
Byrd's No. 42 car at Las Vegas Motor Speedway in 2026

Byrd first started his racing career in 2018, and began his driving career two years later, where he competed in the Lucas Oil Formula Car Racing Series, the Mel Kenyon Midget Series, the Radical Focus Midget Series, and a one-off race in the USAC Midget Series. He then raced in 15 different racing series in 2021, including the USAC Silver Crown Series, the USAC Radical Focus Midget Series, where he finished second in the final points standings, the Carolina Pro Late Model Series, the SRL SPEARS Pro Late Model Series, and the Lucas Oil Modified Series. He continued to race in various series throughout 2022 and 2023 like the Atlantic Championship Series, the F2000 Championship Series, the North American Formula 1000 Championship, where he won the championship in 2022, and the Trans-Am Series, where he won in the XGT class at Lime Rock Park.

On May 22, 2024, it was announced that Byrd would be making his debut in the NASCAR Xfinity Series at Portland International Raceway, driving the No. 92 Chevrolet for DGM Racing.

On January 27, 2025, Young's Motorsports announced that Byrd would drive the No. 02 for the majority of the 2025 Truck season, competing in fifteen of 25 races for the team.

In 2026, Byrd ran select races in the NASCAR O'Reilly Auto Parts Series for Young's Motorsports in the No. 42 Chevrolet.

== Motorsports results ==
=== Single seater career summary ===
Season	Series	Team	Races	Wins	Poles	F/Laps	Podiums	Points	Position
2021	North American Formula 1000 Championship	Arrive Drive Motorsports	9	1	0	0	5	207	5th
2021	F2000 Championship Series	Global Racing Team	3	0	0	0	1	202	11th
2021	U.S. F2000 National Championship	Legacy Autosport	7	0	0	0	0	11	29th
2022	F2000 Championship Series	Arrive Drive Motorsports	10	1	0	0	6	360	4th

=== Stock car career summary ===
Season	Series	Team	Races	Wins	Top 5	Top 10	Points	Position
2024	NASCAR Xfinity Series	DGM Racing	2	0	0	0	0	NC†
2024	NASCAR Xfinity Series	SS-Green Light Racing	1	0	0	0	0	NC†
2024	NASCAR Craftsman Truck Series	Young's Motorsports	3	0	0	0	11	65th
2025	NASCAR Craftsman Truck Series	Young's Motorsports	15	0	0	0	185	28th
2026	NASCAR O'Reilly Auto Parts Series	Young's Motorsports	9	0	0	0	79	38th

^{†} As Byrd was a guest driver, he was ineligible for championship points.

=== American open-wheel racing results ===
==== North American Formula 1000 Championship ====
(key) (Races in bold indicate pole position) (Races in italics indicate fastest lap) (Races with * indicate most race laps led)

Year	Team	1	2	3	4	5	6	7	8	9	10	11	12	13	14	15	16	Rank	Points
2021	Arrive Drive Motorsports	CMP; 9	CMP; 4	MOH	MOH	BAR; 3	BAR; 2	PIRC; 8	PIRC; 2	ROA; Ret	ROA; 4	SP	SP	ACC; 2	ACC; 4	PIRC	PIRC; 1	5th	207

==== F2000 Championship Series ====
(key) (Races in bold indicate pole position) (Races in italics indicate fastest lap) (Races with * indicate most race laps led)

Year	Team	1	2	3	4	5	6	7	8	9	10	11	12	13	14	15	16	Rank	Points
2021	Global Racing Team	CMP	CMP	MOH	MOH	BAR	BAR	PIRC; 5	PIRC; 6	ROA	ROA	SP	SP	ACC	ACC	PIRC	PIRC; 2	11th	102
2022	Arrive Drive Motorsports	CMP; 4	CMP; DSQ	MOH; 4	MOH; 2	BAR; 3	BAR; 3	PIRC; 1	PIRC; 4	ACC; 3	ACC; 2	SP	SP	PIRC	PIRC			4th	360

==== U.S. F2000 National Championship ====
(key) (Races in bold indicate pole position) (Races in italics indicate fastest lap) (Races with * indicate most race laps led)

Year	Team	1	2	3	4	5	6	7	8	9	10	11	12	13	14	15	16	17	18	Rank	Points
2021	Legacy Autosport	ALA; 1	ALA; 2	STP; 1	STP; 2	IMS; 1	IMS; 2	IMS; 3	LOR; 21	ROA; 1	ROA; 2	MOH; 1; 23	MOH; 2; 24	MOH; 3; 22	NJMP; 1; 22	NJMP; 2; 17	NJMP; 3; 23	MOH; 4	MOH; 5	29th	11

=== NASCAR ===
(key) (Bold – Pole position awarded by qualifying time. Italics – Pole position earned by points standings or practice time. * – Most laps led.)

==== O'Reilly Auto Parts Series ====
NASCAR O'Reilly Auto Parts Series results
Year	Team	No.	Make	1	2	3	4	5	6	7	8	9	10	11	12	13	14	15	16	17	18	19	20	21	22	23	24	25	26	27	28	29	30	31	32	33	NOAPSC	Pts	Ref
2024	DGM Racing	92	Chevy	DAY	ATL	LVS	PHO	COA	RCH	MAR	TEX	TAL	DOV	DAR	CLT	PIR; 21	SON	IOW	NHA; 36	NSH	CSC	POC	IND	MCH	DAY	DAR	ATL	GLN	BRI	KAN	TAL						100th	0^{1}	
2024	SS-Green Light Racing	14	Chevy																													ROV; 25	LVS	HOM	MAR	PHO	100th	0^{1}	
2026	Young's Motorsports	42	Chevy	DAY	ATL	COA	PHO; 31	LVS; 32	DAR; 34	MAR	CAR; 16	BRI	KAN; 24	TAL	TEX	GLN	DOV	CLT; 26	NSH	POC; 35	COR	SON	CHI	ATL	IND; 31	IOW; 25	DAY	DAR	GTW	BRI	LVS	CLT	PHO	TAL	MAR	HOM	38th	79	

==== Craftsman Truck Series ====
NASCAR Craftsman Truck Series results
Year	Team	No.	Make	1	2	3	4	5	6	7	8	9	10	11	12	13	14	15	16	17	18	19	20	21	22	23	24	25	NCTC	Pts	Ref
2024	Young's Motorsports	02	Chevy	DAY	ATL	LVS	BRI	COA	MAR	TEX	KAN	DAR	NWS	CLT	GTW	NSH	POC	IRP	RCH	MLW	BRI	KAN; 19	TAL	HOM; 29	MAR	PHO; 26			65th	11	
2025	Young's Motorsports	02	Chevy	DAY; 31	ATL; 31	LVS; 29	HOM; 27	MAR; 29	BRI; 28	CAR; 14	TEX; 14	KAN; 29	NWS	CLT	NSH; 28	MCH; 30	POC; 21	LRP	IRP	GLN	RCH	DAR; 27	BRI	NHA	ROV	TAL; 18	MAR	PHO; 15	28th	185	

^{*} Season still in progress
^{1} Ineligible for series points
