= 2026 Bennett Transportation & Logistics 250 =

NASCAR O'Reilly Auto Parts Series race at EchoPark Speedway

Race details
- Race 2 of 33 in the 2026 NASCAR O'Reilly Auto Parts Series
- Date: February 21, 2026
- Location: EchoPark Speedway in Hampton, Georgia
- Course: Permanent racing facility
- Course length: 1.54 miles (2.48 km)
- Distance: 163 laps, 251.02 mi (403.98 km)
- Average speed: 105.508 miles per hour (169.799 km/h)

Pole position
Driver	Sam Mayer	Haas Factory Team
- Time: 31.804

Most laps led
Driver	Austin Hill	Richard Childress Racing
- Laps: 34

Fastest lap
Driver	Jeb Burton	Jordan Anderson Racing
- Time: 30.883

Winner
No. 00	Sheldon Creed	Haas Factory Team

Television in the United States
- Network: The CW
- Announcers: Adam Alexander, Jamie McMurray, and Parker Kligerman

Radio in the United States
- Radio: PRN
- Booth announcers: Brad Gillie and Nick Yeoman
- Turn announcers: Doug Turnbull (1 & 2) and Jack Johnson (3 & 4)

The 2026 Bennett Transportation & Logistics 250 was a NASCAR O'Reilly Auto Parts Series race held on Saturday, February 21, 2026, at EchoPark Speedway in Hampton, Georgia. Contested over 163 laps on the 1.54-mile-long (2.48 km) asphalt quad-oval intermediate speedway (with superspeedway rules), it was the second race of the 2026 NASCAR O'Reilly Auto Parts Series season, and the 35th running of the event.

Sheldon Creed, driving for Haas Factory Team, broke through after Ross Chastain and Austin Hill collided on the final lap, giving Creed the lead and held on to earn his first career NASCAR O'Reilly Auto Parts Series win after 15 runner-up finishes. Parker Retzlaff tied a career-best 2nd, and Nick Sanchez finished 3rd. Corey Day and Jesse Love rounded out the top five, while Chastain, Sam Mayer, Rajah Caruth, Taylor Gray, and Brandon Jones rounded out the top ten.

== Report ==
=== Background ===
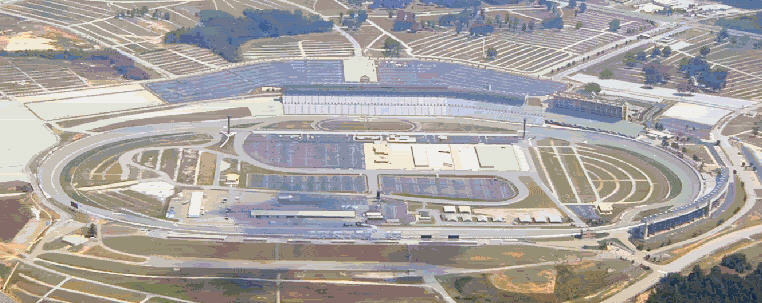
Atlanta Motor Speedway, the track where the race will be held.

Atlanta Motor Speedway is a 1.54-mile race track in Hampton, Georgia, United States, 20 miles (32 km) south of Atlanta. It has annually hosted NASCAR O'Reilly Auto Parts Series stock car races since 1992.

The venue was bought by Speedway Motorsports in 1990. Then in 1994, a total of 46 condominiums were built over the northeastern side of the track. In 1997, to standardize the track with Speedway Motorsports' other two intermediate ovals, the entire track was almost completely rebuilt. The frontstretch and backstretch were swapped, and the configuration of the track was changed from oval to quad-oval, with a new official length of 1.54-mile (2.48 km) where before it was 1.522-mile (2.449 km). The project made the track one of the fastest on the NASCAR circuit. In July 2021 NASCAR announced that the track would be reprofiled for the 2022 season to have 28 degrees of banking and would be narrowed from 55 to 40 feet which the track claims will turn racing at the track similar to restrictor plate superspeedways. Despite the reprofiling being criticized by drivers, construction began in August 2021 and wrapped up in December 2021. The track has seating capacity of 71,000 to 125,000 people depending on the tracks configuration.

On June 3, 2025, SMI announced the track's renaming to EchoPark Speedway under a new seven-year sponsorship deal with the Smith family-owned business, EchoPark. The renaming ended a 35-year stint under the Atlanta Motor Speedway name.

==== Entry list ====
- (R) denotes rookie driver.
- (i) denotes driver who is ineligible for series driver points.

#	Driver	Team	Make
00	Sheldon Creed	Haas Factory Team	Chevrolet
0	Garrett Smithley	SS-Green Light Racing	Chevrolet
1	Carson Kvapil	JR Motorsports	Chevrolet
02	Ryan Ellis	Young's Motorsports	Chevrolet
2	Jesse Love	Richard Childress Racing	Chevrolet
5	Luke Fenhaus (R)	Hettinger Racing	Ford
07	Josh Bilicki	SS-Green Light Racing	Chevrolet
7	Justin Allgaier	JR Motorsports	Chevrolet
8	Sammy Smith	JR Motorsports	Chevrolet
17	Corey Day	Hendrick Motorsports	Chevrolet
18	William Sawalich	Joe Gibbs Racing	Toyota
19	Gio Ruggiero (i)	Joe Gibbs Racing	Toyota
20	Brandon Jones	Joe Gibbs Racing	Toyota
21	Austin Hill	Richard Childress Racing	Chevrolet
24	Harrison Burton	Sam Hunt Racing	Toyota
25	Nick Sanchez	AM Racing	Ford
26	Dean Thompson	Sam Hunt Racing	Toyota
27	Jeb Burton	Jordan Anderson Racing	Chevrolet
28	Kyle Sieg	RSS Racing	Chevrolet
30	Cody Ware (i)	Barrett–Cope Racing	Chevrolet
31	Blaine Perkins	Jordan Anderson Racing	Chevrolet
32	Ross Chastain (i)	Jordan Anderson Racing	Chevrolet
35	Joey Gase	Joey Gase Motorsports	Chevrolet
39	Ryan Sieg	RSS Racing	Chevrolet
41	Sam Mayer	Haas Factory Team	Chevrolet
42	Nick Leitz (i)	Young's Motorsports	Chevrolet
44	Brennan Poole	Alpha Prime Racing	Chevrolet
45	Lavar Scott (R)	Alpha Prime Racing	Chevrolet
48	Patrick Staropoli (R)	Big Machine Racing	Chevrolet
51	Jeremy Clements	Jeremy Clements Racing	Chevrolet
54	Taylor Gray	Joe Gibbs Racing	Toyota
55	Chad Finchum (i)	Joey Gase Motorsports	Chevrolet
74	Dawson Cram	Mike Harmon Racing	Chevrolet
87	Austin Green	Peterson Racing	Chevrolet
88	Rajah Caruth	JR Motorsports	Chevrolet
91	Mason Maggio	DGM Racing	Chevrolet
92	Josh Williams	DGM Racing	Chevrolet
96	Anthony Alfredo	Viking Motorsports	Chevrolet
99	Parker Retzlaff	Viking Motorsports	Chevrolet
Official entry list

== Qualifying ==
Qualifying was held on Friday, February 20, at 5:00 PM EST. Since EchoPark Speedway is an intermediate track with superspeedway rules, the qualifying procedure used was a single-car, single-lap system with two rounds. In the first round, drivers had one lap to set a time and determined positions 11–38. The fastest ten drivers from the first round advanced to the second and final round, and whoever set the fastest time in Round 2 won the pole and determined the rest of the starting lineup.

Sam Mayer, driving for Haas Factory Team, qualified on pole position, having advanced from the preliminary round and set the fastest time in Round 2, with a lap of 31.804 seconds, and a speed of 174.318 mph (280.538 km/h).

Dawson Cram was the only driver who failed to qualify.

=== Qualifying results ===
Pos.	#	Driver	Team	Make	Time (R1)	Speed (R1)	Time (R2)	Speed (R2)
1	41	Sam Mayer	Haas Factory Team	Chevrolet	31.873	173.940	31.804	174.318
2	1	Carson Kvapil	JR Motorsports	Chevrolet	32.019	173.147	31.885	173.875
3	54	Taylor Gray	Joe Gibbs Racing	Toyota	32.002	173.239	31.905	173.766
4	00	Sheldon Creed	Haas Factory Team	Chevrolet	31.938	173.586	31.906	173.760
5	18	William Sawalich	Joe Gibbs Racing	Toyota	31.940	173.575	31.927	173.646
6	88	Rajah Caruth	JR Motorsports	Chevrolet	32.020	173.142	31.941	173.570
7	19	Gio Ruggiero (i)	Joe Gibbs Racing	Toyota	32.035	173.061	32.006	173.218
8	8	Sammy Smith	JR Motorsports	Chevrolet	32.024	173.120	32.031	173.082
9	17	Corey Day	Hendrick Motorsports	Chevrolet	32.111	172.651	32.036	173.055
10	2	Jesse Love	Richard Childress Racing	Chevrolet	32.091	172.759	32.057	172.942
Eliminated in Round 1
11	7	Justin Allgaier	JR Motorsports	Chevrolet	32.114	172.635	—	—
12	39	Ryan Sieg	RSS Racing	Chevrolet	32.182	172.270	—	—
13	24	Harrison Burton	Sam Hunt Racing	Toyota	32.221	172.062	—	—
14	48	Patrick Staropoli (R)	Big Machine Racing	Chevrolet	32.228	172.024	—	—
15	20	Brandon Jones	Joe Gibbs Racing	Toyota	32.238	171.971	—	—
16	35	Joey Gase	Joey Gase Motorsports	Chevrolet	32.278	171.758	—	—
17	26	Dean Thompson	Sam Hunt Racing	Toyota	32.281	171.742	—	—
18	28	Kyle Sieg	RSS Racing	Chevrolet	32.288	171.705	—	—
19	91	Mason Maggio	DGM Racing	Chevrolet	32.337	171.444	—	—
20	21	Austin Hill	Richard Childress Racing	Chevrolet	32.341	171.423	—	—
21	92	Josh Williams	DGM Racing	Chevrolet	32.407	171.074	—	—
22	31	Blaine Perkins	Jordan Anderson Racing	Chevrolet	32.410	171.058	—	—
23	99	Parker Retzlaff	Viking Motorsports	Chevrolet	32.423	170.990	—	—
24	96	Anthony Alfredo	Viking Motorsports	Chevrolet	32.429	170.958	—	—
25	27	Jeb Burton	Jordan Anderson Racing	Chevrolet	32.505	170.558	—	—
26	02	Ryan Ellis	Young's Motorsports	Chevrolet	32.580	170.166	—	—
27	5	Luke Fenhaus (R)	Hettinger Racing	Ford	32.596	170.082	—	—
28	25	Nick Sanchez	AM Racing	Ford	32.597	170.077	—	—
29	0	Garrett Smithley	SS-Green Light Racing	Chevrolet	32.625	169.931	—	—
30	32	Ross Chastain (i)	Jordan Anderson Racing	Chevrolet	32.641	169.848	—	—
31	87	Austin Green	Peterson Racing	Chevrolet	32.712	169.479	—	—
32	51	Jeremy Clements	Jeremy Clements Racing	Chevrolet	32.761	169.226	—	—
Qualified by owner's points
33	44	Brennan Poole	Alpha Prime Racing	Chevrolet	32.793	169.060	—	—
34	45	Lavar Scott (R)	Alpha Prime Racing	Chevrolet	32.807	168.988	—	—
35	07	Josh Bilicki	SS-Green Light Racing	Chevrolet	32.817	168.937	—	—
36	30	Cody Ware (i)	Barrett–Cope Racing	Chevrolet	32.849	168.772	—	—
37	55	Chad Finchum (i)	Joey Gase Motorsports	Chevrolet	33.000	168.000	—	—
38	42	Nick Leitz (i)	Young's Motorsports	Chevrolet	33.136	167.310	—	—
Failed to qualify
39	74	Dawson Cram	Mike Harmon Racing	Chevrolet	33.577	165.113	—	—
Official qualifying results
Official starting lineup

== Race ==
=== Race results ===
==== Stage Results ====
Stage One Laps: 40

Pos.	#	Driver	Team	Make	Pts
1	2	Jesse Love	Richard Childress Racing	Chevrolet	10
2	88	Rajah Caruth	JR Motorsports	Chevrolet	9
3	99	Parker Retzlaff	Viking Motorsports	Chevrolet	8
4	54	Taylor Gray	Joe Gibbs Racing	Toyota	7
5	7	Justin Allgaier	JR Motorsports	Chevrolet	6
6	00	Sheldon Creed	Haas Factory Team	Chevrolet	5
7	1	Carson Kvapil	JR Motorsports	Chevrolet	4
8	25	Nick Sanchez	AM Racing	Ford	3
9	51	Jeremy Clements	Jeremy Clements Racing	Chevrolet	2
10	32	Ross Chastain (i)	Jordan Anderson Racing	Chevrolet	0

Stage Two Laps: 40

Pos.	#	Driver	Team	Make	Pts
1	88	Rajah Caruth	JR Motorsports	Chevrolet	10
2	7	Justin Allgaier	JR Motorsports	Chevrolet	9
3	1	Carson Kvapil	JR Motorsports	Chevrolet	8
4	17	Corey Day	Hendrick Motorsports	Chevrolet	7
5	20	Brandon Jones	Joe Gibbs Racing	Toyota	6
6	8	Sammy Smith	JR Motorsports	Chevrolet	5
7	21	Austin Hill	Richard Childress Racing	Chevrolet	4
8	99	Parker Retzlaff	Viking Motorsports	Chevrolet	3
9	00	Sheldon Creed	Haas Factory Team	Chevrolet	2
10	2	Jesse Love	Richard Childress Racing	Chevrolet	1

=== Final Stage Results ===
Stage Three Laps: 83

Fin	St	#	Driver	Team	Make	Laps	Led	Status	Pts
1	4	00	Sheldon Creed	Haas Factory Team	Chevrolet	163	17	Running	62
2	23	99	Parker Retzlaff	Viking Motorsports	Chevrolet	163	0	Running	46
3	28	25	Nick Sanchez	AM Racing	Ford	163	0	Running	37
4	9	17	Corey Day	Hendrick Motorsports	Chevrolet	163	0	Running	40
5	10	2	Jesse Love	Richard Childress Racing	Chevrolet	163	31	Running	43
6	30	32	Ross Chastain (i)	Jordan Anderson Racing	Chevrolet	163	22	Running	0
7	1	41	Sam Mayer	Haas Factory Team	Chevrolet	163	23	Running	30
8	6	88	Rajah Caruth	JR Motorsports	Chevrolet	163	22	Running	48
9	3	54	Taylor Gray	Joe Gibbs Racing	Toyota	163	2	Running	35
10	15	20	Brandon Jones	Joe Gibbs Racing	Toyota	163	0	Running	33
11	17	26	Dean Thompson	Sam Hunt Racing	Toyota	163	0	Running	26
12	20	21	Austin Hill	Richard Childress Racing	Chevrolet	163	34	Running	29
13	14	48	Patrick Staropoli (R)	Big Machine Racing	Chevrolet	163	0	Running	24
14	29	0	Garrett Smithley	SS-Green Light Racing	Chevrolet	163	0	Running	23
15	35	07	Josh Bilicki	SS-Green Light Racing	Chevrolet	163	0	Running	22
16	25	27	Jeb Burton	Jordan Anderson Racing	Chevrolet	163	0	Running	22
17	37	55	Chad Finchum (i)	Joey Gase Motorsports	Chevrolet	163	0	Running	0
18	38	42	Nick Leitz (i)	Young's Motorsports	Chevrolet	163	0	Running	0
19	33	44	Brennan Poole	Alpha Prime Racing	Chevrolet	163	0	Running	18
20	27	5	Luke Fenhaus (R)	Hettinger Racing	Ford	162	0	Running	17
21	31	87	Austin Green	Peterson Racing	Chevrolet	162	0	Running	16
22	26	02	Ryan Ellis	Young's Motorsports	Chevrolet	161	0	Running	15
23	5	18	William Sawalich	Joe Gibbs Racing	Toyota	161	5	Running	14
24	7	19	Gio Ruggiero (i)	Joe Gibbs Racing	Toyota	160	0	Running	0
25	24	96	Anthony Alfredo	Viking Motorsports	Chevrolet	160	0	Running	12
26	19	91	Mason Maggio	DGM Racing	Chevrolet	155	0	Engine	11
27	21	92	Josh Williams	DGM Racing	Chevrolet	151	0	Accident	10
28	34	45	Lavar Scott (R)	Alpha Prime Racing	Chevrolet	150	1	Accident	9
29	32	51	Jeremy Clements	Jeremy Clements Racing	Chevrolet	149	0	Running	10
30	8	8	Sammy Smith	JR Motorsports	Chevrolet	141	0	Accident	12
31	36	30	Cody Ware (i)	Barrett–Cope Racing	Chevrolet	120	0	Suspension	0
32	2	1	Carson Kvapil	JR Motorsports	Chevrolet	106	5	Accident	17
33	11	7	Justin Allgaier	JR Motorsports	Chevrolet	106	1	Accident	19
34	16	35	Joey Gase	Joey Gase Motorsports	Chevrolet	39	0	Engine	3
35	13	24	Harrison Burton	Sam Hunt Racing	Toyota	8	0	DVP	2
36	22	31	Blaine Perkins	Jordan Anderson Racing	Chevrolet	6	0	DVP	1
37	12	39	Ryan Sieg	RSS Racing	Chevrolet	4	0	Accident	1
38	18	28	Kyle Sieg	RSS Racing	Chevrolet	4	0	Accident	1
Official race results

=== Race statistics ===
- Lead changes: 24 among 11 different drivers
- Cautions/Laps: 7 for 46 laps
- Red flags: 1
- Time of race: 2 hours, 22 minutes and 45 seconds
- Average speed: 105.508 miles per hour (169.799 km/h)

== Standings after the race ==
Drivers' Championship standings

	Pos	Driver	Points
	1	Austin Hill	104
6	2	Rajah Caruth	82 (–22)
17	3	Sheldon Creed	80 (–24)
	4	Jesse Love	80 (–24)
6	5	Parker Retzlaff	74 (–30)
4	6	Justin Allgaier	69 (–35)
4	7	Carson Kvapil	64 (–40)
16	8	Corey Day	50 (–54)
4	9	Sammy Smith	48 (–56)
	10	Ryan Ellis	46 (–58)
15	11	Taylor Gray	44 (–60)
1	12	Brennan Poole	43 (–61)
Official driver's standings

Manufacturers' Championship standings

Pos	Manufacturer	Points
1	Chevrolet	110
2	Ford	50 (–60)
3	Toyota	39 (–71)

- Note: Only the first 12 positions are included for the driver standings.

Previous race: 2026 United Rentals 300	NASCAR O'Reilly Auto Parts Series; 2026 season	Next race: 2026 Focused Health 250 (COTA)
