= Derek Lemke =

American racing driver

- Lemke's No. 53 car at Charlotte Motor Speedway in 2026
- Born: November 23, 1993 (age 32); Shakopee, Minnesota, U.S.

NASCAR O'Reilly Auto Parts Series career
- 2 races run over 1 year
- 2026 position: 90th
- Best finish: 90th (2026)
- First race: 2026 Hy-Vee PERKS 250 (Iowa)
- Last race: 2026 Blue Cross NC 300 (Charlotte)
Wins	Top tens	Poles
0	0	0

NASCAR FedEx Freight Truck Series career
- 4 races run over 2 years
- 2026 position: 57th
- Best finish: 57th (2026)
- First race: 2023 Worldwide Express 250 (Richmond)
- Last race: 2026 Black's Tire 250 (Richmond)
Wins	Top tens	Poles
0	0	0
- Statistics up to date as of November 7, 2026.

Derek Lemke (born November 23, 1993) is an American professional stock car racing driver. He last competed part-time in the NASCAR Craftsman Truck Series, driving the No. 22 Ford F-150 for Team Reaume, and part-time in the NASCAR O'Reilly Auto Parts Series, driving the No. 91 Chevrolet Camaro SS for DGM Racing with Jesse Iwuji Motorsports, and the No. 53 Chevrolet Camaro SS for Joey Gase Motorsports with Scott Osteen. He also competes in late model racing.

== Racing career ==
From 2012 to 2017, Lemke competed for the track championship at Elko Speedway in the NASCAR Advance Auto Parts Weekly Series, earning one win in 2014 and in 2017, with a best points finish of sixth.

Lemke has also raced in the ARCA Midwest Tour, running one to two races each year from 2012 to 2016. He also ran one CARS Tour race in 2019 at Hickory Motor Speedway, starting sixteenth and finishing twelfth. In 2021, he drove in the 52nd running of the Oktoberfest Late Model event, driving for a team owned by Natalie Decker.

=== O'Reilly Auto Parts Series ===
On August 3, 2026, it was announced that Lemke will make his debut in the NASCAR O'Reilly Auto Parts Series at Iowa Speedway, driving the No. 91 Chevrolet for DGM Racing with Jesse Iwuji Motorsports.

=== Craftsman Truck Series ===
On July 26, 2023, it was announced that Lemke would make his NASCAR Craftsman Truck Series debut at Richmond Raceway, driving the No. 33 for Reaume Brothers Racing. He would later make his second start with the team at the Milwaukee Mile.

== Personal life ==
Lemke is currently married to fellow NASCAR driver Natalie Decker.

== Motorsports career results ==
=== NASCAR ===
(key) (Bold – Pole position awarded by qualifying time. Italics – Pole position earned by points standings or practice time. * – Most laps led.)

==== O'Reilly Auto Parts Series ====
NASCAR O'Reilly Auto Parts Series results
Year	Team	No.	Make	1	2	3	4	5	6	7	8	9	10	11	12	13	14	15	16	17	18	19	20	21	22	23	24	25	26	27	28	29	30	31	32	33	NOAPSC	Pts	Ref
2026	DGM Racing with Jesse Iwuji Motorsports	91	Chevy	DAY	ATL	COA	PHO	LVS	DAR	MAR	ROC	BRI	KAN	TAL	TEX	GLN	DOV	CLT	NSH	POC	COR	SON	CHI	ATL	IND	IOW; 26	DAY	DAR	GTW	BRI	LVS						90th	0^{1}	
2026	Joey Gase Motorsports with Scott Osteen	53	Chevy																													CLT; 28	PHO	TAL	MAR	HOM	90th	0^{1}	

==== Craftsman Truck Series ====
NASCAR Craftsman Truck Series results
Year	Team	No.	Make	1	2	3	4	5	6	7	8	9	10	11	12	13	14	15	16	17	18	19	20	21	22	23	24	25	NCTC	Pts	Ref
2023	Reaume Brothers Racing	33	Ford	DAY	LVS	ATL	COA	TEX	BRI	MAR	KAN	DAR	NWS	CLT	GTW	NSH	MOH	POC	RCH; 33	IRP	MLW; 31	KAN	BRI	TAL	HOM	PHO			71st	10	
2026	Team Reaume	22	Ford	DAY	ATL	STP	DAR	ROC	BRI	TEX	GLN	DOV	CLT	NSH; 21	MCH	COR	LRP	NWS	IRP	RCH; 24	NHA	BRI	KAN	CLT	PHO	TAL	MAR	HOM	57th	29	

=== CARS Super Late Model Tour ===
(key)

CARS Super Late Model Tour results
Year	Team	No.	Make	1	2	3	4	5	6	7	8	CSLMTC	Pts	Ref
2019	N/A	04	Toyota	SNM	HCY	NSH	MMS	BRI	HCY; 12	ROU	SBO	35th	21	
