= 2026 NASCAR O'Reilly Auto Parts Series =

American motorsport season

Justin Allgaier, the No. 1 seed, won his second O'Reilly Auto Parts Series championship.

Jesse Love, the defending champion, finished second in the championship standings.

Carson Kvapil finished third in the championship standings.

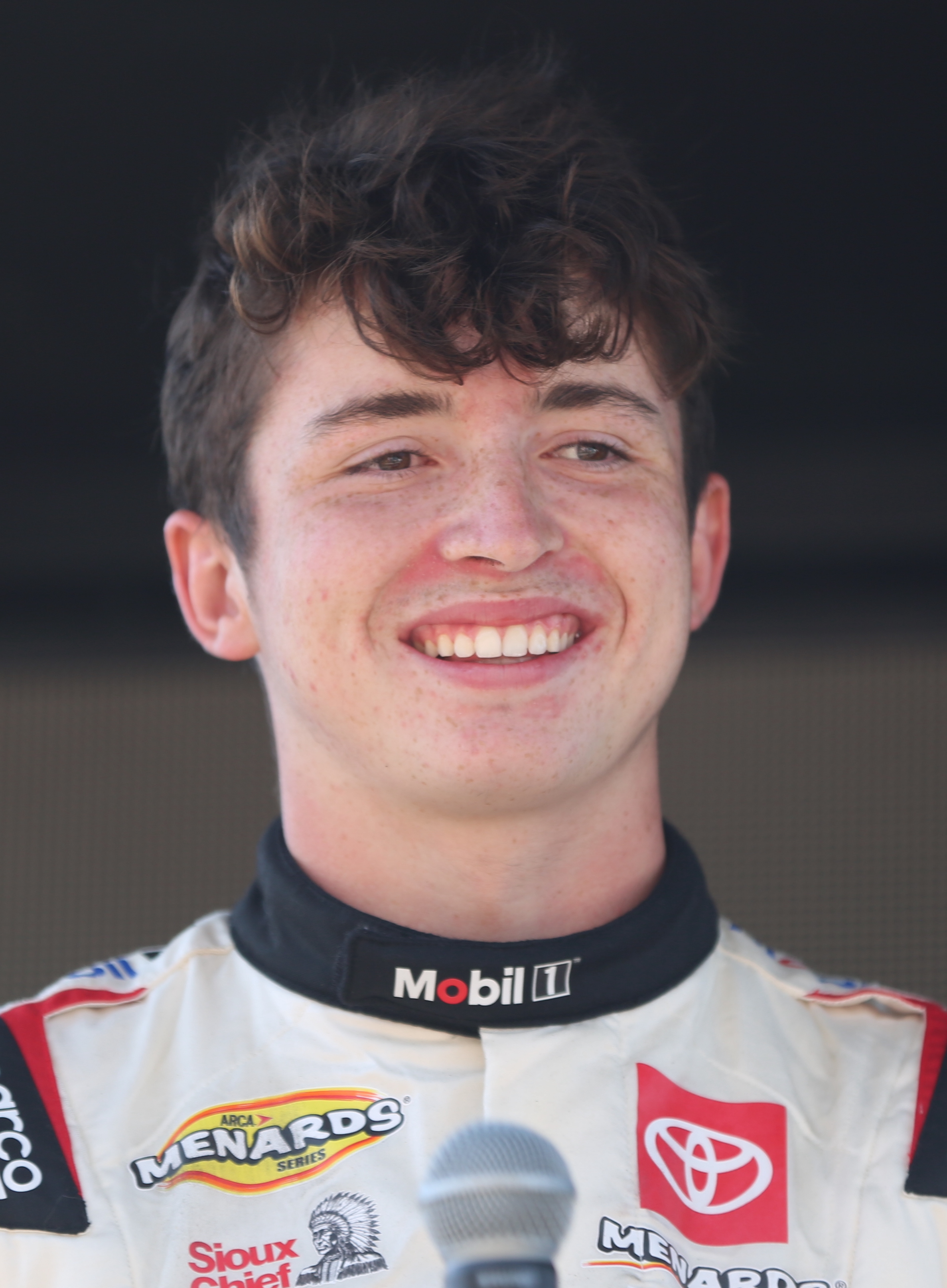
Brent Crews, the Rookie of the Year.

Chevrolet won the Manufacturer's Championship with a record-breaking 29 wins in the year.

The 2026 NASCAR O'Reilly Auto Parts Series was the 45th season of the NASCAR O'Reilly Auto Parts Series, a stock car racing series sanctioned by NASCAR in the United States. The season started on February 14 with the United Rentals 300 at Daytona International Speedway and ended at Homestead–Miami Speedway with the O'Reilly Auto Parts 300 on November 7.

Jesse Love of Richard Childress Racing entered the season as the 2025 NASCAR Xfinity Series champion. This season saw the debut of The Chase as the series' championship format, replacing the elimination-style playoff format after a decade of service; The Chase took place in the final 9 races of the season and featured the top 12 drivers in points as championship protagonists. Following the Focused Health 250 at EchoPark Speedway, Justin Allgaier claimed the No. 1 seed in the Chase. Within the Chase, Allgaier found himself in a 5-way championship fight between him, Sheldon Creed, Corey Day, Carson Kvapil, and defending champion Love, that went down to the final race of the season at Homestead–Miami Speedway. Ultimately, Allgaier clinched his second career O'Reilly Auto Parts Series championship with a seventh-place finish.

This was the first year under the new title sponsor, O'Reilly Auto Parts, as Xfinity did not extend their sponsorship.

== Teams and drivers ==
=== Full-time teams ===
Manufacturer	Team	No.	Driver	Crew chief	Ref
Chevrolet	Big Machine Racing	48	Patrick Staropoli (R)	Patrick Donahue 29; Darrell Phillips 4	
Chevrolet	DGM Racing with Jesse Iwuji Motorsports	91	Mason Maggio 18	Mario Gosselin	
Chevrolet	DGM Racing with Jesse Iwuji Motorsports	91	Carson Kvapil 4	Mario Gosselin	
Chevrolet	DGM Racing with Jesse Iwuji Motorsports	91	Alex Labbé 2	Mario Gosselin	
Chevrolet	DGM Racing with Jesse Iwuji Motorsports	91	Ross Chastain 1	Mario Gosselin	
Chevrolet	DGM Racing with Jesse Iwuji Motorsports	91	Myatt Snider 3	Mario Gosselin	
Chevrolet	DGM Racing with Jesse Iwuji Motorsports	91	Dexter Bean 1	Mario Gosselin	
Chevrolet	DGM Racing with Jesse Iwuji Motorsports	91	Jesse Iwuji 1	Mario Gosselin	
Chevrolet	DGM Racing with Jesse Iwuji Motorsports	91	Derek Lemke 1	Mario Gosselin	
Chevrolet	DGM Racing with Jesse Iwuji Motorsports	91	Stefan Parsons 1	Mario Gosselin	
Chevrolet	DGM Racing with Jesse Iwuji Motorsports	91	Leland Honeyman 1	Mario Gosselin	
Chevrolet	DGM Racing with Jesse Iwuji Motorsports	92	Josh Williams 19	Steve Addington	
Chevrolet	DGM Racing with Jesse Iwuji Motorsports	92	Alex Guenette 1	Steve Addington	
Chevrolet	DGM Racing with Jesse Iwuji Motorsports	92	B. J. McLeod 1	Steve Addington	
Chevrolet	DGM Racing with Jesse Iwuji Motorsports	92	Leland Honeyman 6	Steve Addington	
Chevrolet	DGM Racing with Jesse Iwuji Motorsports	92	Preston Pardus 2	Steve Addington	
Chevrolet	DGM Racing with Jesse Iwuji Motorsports	92	Mason Maggio 2	Steve Addington	
Chevrolet	DGM Racing with Jesse Iwuji Motorsports	92	Alex Labbé 1	Steve Addington	
Chevrolet	Haas Factory Team	00	Sheldon Creed	Jonathan Toney	
Chevrolet	Haas Factory Team	41	Sam Mayer	Jason Trinchere	
Chevrolet	Hendrick Motorsports	17	Corey Day	Adam Wall	
Chevrolet	Jeremy Clements Racing	51	Jeremy Clements	Matt Weber	
Chevrolet	Jordan Anderson Racing	27	Jeb Burton	J. C. Umscheid 32; Mark Setzer 1	
Chevrolet	Jordan Anderson Racing	31	Blaine Perkins	Cody McKenzie 31; Joe Williams Jr. 2	
Chevrolet	Jordan Anderson Racing	32	Jordan Anderson 3	Mark Setzer 32; J. C. Umscheid 1	
Chevrolet	Jordan Anderson Racing	32	Ross Chastain 4	Mark Setzer 32; J. C. Umscheid 1	
Chevrolet	Jordan Anderson Racing	32	Rajah Caruth 10	Mark Setzer 32; J. C. Umscheid 1	
Chevrolet	Jordan Anderson Racing	32	Andrew Patterson 9	Mark Setzer 32; J. C. Umscheid 1	
Chevrolet	Jordan Anderson Racing	32	Tyler Ankrum 1	Mark Setzer 32; J. C. Umscheid 1	
Chevrolet	Jordan Anderson Racing	32	Carson Brown 2 (Note: Entry was fielded in a collaboration with Richard Childress Racing.)	Mark Setzer 32; J. C. Umscheid 1	
Chevrolet	Jordan Anderson Racing	32	Daniel Dye 4	Mark Setzer 32; J. C. Umscheid 1	
Chevrolet	JR Motorsports	1	Carson Kvapil 24	Rodney Childers	
Chevrolet	JR Motorsports	1	Connor Zilisch 9	Rodney Childers	
Chevrolet	JR Motorsports	7	Justin Allgaier	Andrew Overstreet	
Chevrolet	JR Motorsports	8	Sammy Smith	Cory Shea	
Chevrolet	JR Motorsports	88	Rajah Caruth 23	Mardy Lindley	
Chevrolet	JR Motorsports	88	William Byron 3	Mardy Lindley	
Chevrolet	JR Motorsports	88	Kyle Larson 5	Mardy Lindley	
Chevrolet	JR Motorsports	88	Chase Elliott 2	Mardy Lindley	
Chevrolet	Peterson Racing	87	Austin Green 19	Jody Measamer	
Chevrolet	Peterson Racing	87	Nick Sanchez 11	Jody Measamer	
Chevrolet	Peterson Racing	87	Lee Pulliam 3	Jody Measamer	
Chevrolet	Richard Childress Racing	2	Jesse Love	Danny Stockman Jr.	
Chevrolet	Richard Childress Racing	21	Austin Hill	Chad Haney	
Chevrolet	RSS Racing	28	Kyle Sieg	Aedan McHugh	
Chevrolet	SS-Green Light Racing	07	Josh Bilicki	Paul Clapprood	
Chevrolet	SS-Green Light Racing with BRK Racing	0	Garrett Smithley 22	Bryan Berry	
Chevrolet	SS-Green Light Racing with BRK Racing	0	Alex Labbé 4	Bryan Berry	
Chevrolet	SS-Green Light Racing with BRK Racing	0	Cole Custer 5 (Note: Entries are fielded in a collaboration with Haas Factory Team.)	Bryan Berry	
Chevrolet	SS-Green Light Racing with BRK Racing	0	Myatt Snider 1	Bryan Berry	
Chevrolet	Viking Motorsports	96	Anthony Alfredo	Joshua Graham	
Chevrolet	Viking Motorsports	99	Parker Retzlaff	Danny Efland	
Chevrolet	Young's Motorsports	02	Ryan Ellis	Eddie Troconis	
Chevrolet	Young's Motorsports	42	Carson Hocevar 1	Andrew Abbott	
Chevrolet	Young's Motorsports	42	Nick Leitz 3	Andrew Abbott	
Chevrolet	Young's Motorsports	42	J. J. Yeley 1	Andrew Abbott	
Chevrolet	Young's Motorsports	42	Nathan Byrd 9	Andrew Abbott	
Chevrolet	Young's Motorsports	42	Brad Perez 5	Andrew Abbott	
Chevrolet	Young's Motorsports	42	Logan Bearden 4	Andrew Abbott	
Chevrolet	Young's Motorsports	42	David Starr 1	Andrew Abbott	
Chevrolet	Young's Motorsports	42	Will Rodgers 2	Andrew Abbott	
Chevrolet	Young's Motorsports	42	C. J. McLaughlin 1	Andrew Abbott	
Chevrolet	Young's Motorsports	42	Baltazar Leguizamón 2	Andrew Abbott	
Chevrolet	Young's Motorsports	42	Garrett Smithley 1	Andrew Abbott	
Chevrolet	Young's Motorsports	42	Natalie Decker 1	Andrew Abbott	
Chevrolet	Young's Motorsports	42	Matt DiBenedetto 2	Andrew Abbott	
Toyota	Joe Gibbs Racing	18	William Sawalich	Jeff Meendering	
Toyota	Joe Gibbs Racing	19	Brent Crews (R) 29	Seth Chavka	
Toyota	Joe Gibbs Racing	19	Gio Ruggiero 2	Seth Chavka	
Toyota	Joe Gibbs Racing	19	Chase Briscoe 1	Seth Chavka	
Toyota	Joe Gibbs Racing	19	Christopher Bell 1	Seth Chavka	
Toyota	Joe Gibbs Racing	20	Brandon Jones	Sam McAulay	
Toyota	Joe Gibbs Racing	54	Taylor Gray	Jason Ratcliff	
Toyota	Sam Hunt Racing	24	Harrison Burton	Brian Gainey	
Toyota	Sam Hunt Racing	26	Dean Thompson	Kris Bowen	
Chevrolet 30 Ford 3	Alpha Prime Racing	44	Brennan Poole	Frankie Kerr	
Chevrolet 29 Ford 4	Alpha Prime Racing	45	Lavar Scott (R)	Kase Kallenbach	
Chevrolet 19 Toyota 5 Ford 9	Joey Gase Motorsports with Scott Osteen	55	Joey Gase 25	Scott Eggleston 30; Garrett Harrington 1 Joey Gase 1	
Chevrolet 19 Toyota 5 Ford 9	Joey Gase Motorsports with Scott Osteen	55	Chad Finchum 1	Scott Eggleston 30; Garrett Harrington 1 Joey Gase 1	
Chevrolet 19 Toyota 5 Ford 9	Joey Gase Motorsports with Scott Osteen	55	Sage Karam 1	Scott Eggleston 30; Garrett Harrington 1 Joey Gase 1	
Chevrolet 19 Toyota 5 Ford 9	Joey Gase Motorsports with Scott Osteen	55	Blake Lothian 2	Scott Eggleston 30; Garrett Harrington 1 Joey Gase 1	
Chevrolet 19 Toyota 5 Ford 9	Joey Gase Motorsports with Scott Osteen	55	Glen Reen 1	Scott Eggleston 30; Garrett Harrington 1 Joey Gase 1	
Chevrolet 19 Toyota 5 Ford 9	Joey Gase Motorsports with Scott Osteen	55	Brad Perez 2	Scott Eggleston 30; Garrett Harrington 1 Joey Gase 1	
Chevrolet 19 Toyota 5 Ford 9	Joey Gase Motorsports with Scott Osteen	55	David Starr 1	Scott Eggleston 30; Garrett Harrington 1 Joey Gase 1	
Chevrolet 32 Ford 1	RSS Racing	39	Ryan Sieg 32 (Note: Ryan Sieg is running the full season split between the Nos. 38 and 39 RSS Racing cars.)	Matt Noyce	
Chevrolet 32 Ford 1	RSS Racing	39	Andy Jankowiak 1 (Note: Entry was fielded in a collaboration with KLAS Motorsports.)	Matt Noyce	

=== Part-time teams ===
Manufacturer	Team	No.	Driver	Crew chief	Races	References
Chevrolet	Alpha Prime Racing	4	Caesar Bacarella	Keith Wolfe	3	
Chevrolet	Alpha Prime Racing	4	Anthony Alfredo	Keith Wolfe	1	(Note: At Daytona (race #1), Caesar Bacarella qualified for the race in the No. 4, but after Anthony Alfredo failed to qualify in the No. 96, Viking Motorsports worked a deal with Alpha Prime Racing for Alfredo to replace Bacarella in the No. 4 car in the race.)
Chevrolet	Barrett–Cope Racing	30	Carson Ware	George Church	1	
Chevrolet	Barrett–Cope Racing	30	Cody Ware	George Church	1	
Chevrolet	Barrett–Cope Racing	30	Baltazar Leguizamón	George Church	1	
Chevrolet	Barrett–Cope Racing	30	Austin J. Hill	George Church	1	
Chevrolet	Barrett–Cope Racing	30	Myatt Snider	George Church	3	
Chevrolet	DGM Racing with Jesse Iwuji Motorsports	71	Leland Honeyman	Nathan Kennedy	3	
Chevrolet	JR Motorsports	9	Shane van Gisbergen	Phillip Bell	3	
Chevrolet	JR Motorsports	9	Carson Kvapil	Phillip Bell	5	
Chevrolet	JR Motorsports	9	Ross Chastain	Phillip Bell	5	
Chevrolet	JR Motorsports	9	Lee Pulliam	Phillip Bell	1	
Chevrolet	JR Motorsports	9	Jake Finch	Phillip Bell	6	
Chevrolet	Mike Harmon Racing	74	Dawson Cram	Mike Harmon 6 Kevin Cram 2	7	
Chevrolet	Mike Harmon Racing	74	Gray Gaulding (Note: Entries are fielded in a collaboration with Spraker Racing Enterprises.)	Mike Harmon 6 Kevin Cram 2	1	
Chevrolet	Pardus Racing Inc.	50	Preston Pardus	Dan Pardus	4	
Chevrolet	Richard Childress Racing	3	Austin Dillon	Ryan Chism	1	
Chevrolet	Richard Childress Racing	33	Garrett Mitchell	Robert Strmiska	2	
Chevrolet	SPS Racing	43	Landon S. Huffman	Blake Bainbridge	1	
Chevrolet	SPS Racing	43	Connor Mosack	Blake Bainbridge	2	
Chevrolet	Team Stange Racing with Mike Harmon Racing	47	Dawson Cram	Kevin Cram 13; Jason Miller 1	9	
Chevrolet	Team Stange Racing with Mike Harmon Racing	47	Carson Ware	Kevin Cram 13; Jason Miller 1	3	
Chevrolet	Team Stange Racing with Mike Harmon Racing	47	David Starr	Kevin Cram 13; Jason Miller 1	1	
Chevrolet	Team Stange Racing with Mike Harmon Racing	47	Natalie Decker (Note: Entries are fielded in a collaboration with Young's Motorsports.)	Kevin Cram 13; Jason Miller 1	1	
Ford	AM Racing	25	Nick Sanchez	Dewey Townsend IV	7	
Ford	AM Racing	52	Daniel Dye	Blake Bainbridge 1 Matthew Lucas 2	3	
Ford	Hettinger Racing	5	Luke Fenhaus (R)	Joe Williams Jr.	2	
Ford	Hettinger Racing	5	Tyler Gonzalez	Joe Williams Jr.	1	
Ford	Hettinger Racing	5	Chandler Smith	Joe Williams Jr.	2	
Ford	Hettinger Racing	5	J. J. Yeley	Joe Williams Jr.	4	
Ford	Hettinger Racing	5	Luke Baldwin	Joe Williams Jr.	2	
Chevrolet 18 Toyota 2	Joey Gase Motorsports with Scott Osteen	35	Natalie Decker	Jay Guy 3 Scott Eggleston 2 Jim Gase 3 Garrett Harrington 2 Shannon Shehan 2 Kevin Cram 8	2	
Chevrolet 18 Toyota 2	Joey Gase Motorsports with Scott Osteen	35	Joey Gase	Jay Guy 3 Scott Eggleston 2 Jim Gase 3 Garrett Harrington 2 Shannon Shehan 2 Kevin Cram 8	2	
Chevrolet 18 Toyota 2	Joey Gase Motorsports with Scott Osteen	35	Austin J. Hill	Jay Guy 3 Scott Eggleston 2 Jim Gase 3 Garrett Harrington 2 Shannon Shehan 2 Kevin Cram 8	1	
Chevrolet 18 Toyota 2	Joey Gase Motorsports with Scott Osteen	35	Blake Lothian	Jay Guy 3 Scott Eggleston 2 Jim Gase 3 Garrett Harrington 2 Shannon Shehan 2 Kevin Cram 8	3	
Chevrolet 18 Toyota 2	Joey Gase Motorsports with Scott Osteen	35	Chad Finchum	Jay Guy 3 Scott Eggleston 2 Jim Gase 3 Garrett Harrington 2 Shannon Shehan 2 Kevin Cram 8	1	
Chevrolet 18 Toyota 2	Joey Gase Motorsports with Scott Osteen	35	Matt DiBenedetto	Jay Guy 3 Scott Eggleston 2 Jim Gase 3 Garrett Harrington 2 Shannon Shehan 2 Kevin Cram 8	1	
Chevrolet 18 Toyota 2	Joey Gase Motorsports with Scott Osteen	35	Justin Carroll	Jay Guy 3 Scott Eggleston 2 Jim Gase 3 Garrett Harrington 2 Shannon Shehan 2 Kevin Cram 8	2	
Chevrolet 18 Toyota 2	Joey Gase Motorsports with Scott Osteen	35	Dawson Cram	Jay Guy 3 Scott Eggleston 2 Jim Gase 3 Garrett Harrington 2 Shannon Shehan 2 Kevin Cram 8	6 (Note: Entries are fielded in a collaboration with Mike Harmon Racing.)	
Chevrolet 18 Toyota 2	Joey Gase Motorsports with Scott Osteen	35	Matt Wilson	Jay Guy 3 Scott Eggleston 2 Jim Gase 3 Garrett Harrington 2 Shannon Shehan 2 Kevin Cram 8	1	
Chevrolet 18 Toyota 2	Joey Gase Motorsports with Scott Osteen	35	Carson Ware	Jay Guy 3 Scott Eggleston 2 Jim Gase 3 Garrett Harrington 2 Shannon Shehan 2 Kevin Cram 8	1	
Chevrolet 19 Toyota 3	Joey Gase Motorsports with Scott Osteen	53	David Starr	Jim Gase 1 Garrett Harrington 9 Shannon Shehan 11; Jason Miller 2	5	
Chevrolet 19 Toyota 3	Joey Gase Motorsports with Scott Osteen	53	Derek White	Jim Gase 1 Garrett Harrington 9 Shannon Shehan 11; Jason Miller 2	1	
Chevrolet 19 Toyota 3	Joey Gase Motorsports with Scott Osteen	53	Natalie Decker	Jim Gase 1 Garrett Harrington 9 Shannon Shehan 11; Jason Miller 2	1	
Chevrolet 19 Toyota 3	Joey Gase Motorsports with Scott Osteen	53	Joey Gase	Jim Gase 1 Garrett Harrington 9 Shannon Shehan 11; Jason Miller 2	1	
Chevrolet 19 Toyota 3	Joey Gase Motorsports with Scott Osteen	53	Kyle Kelley	Jim Gase 1 Garrett Harrington 9 Shannon Shehan 11; Jason Miller 2	1	
Chevrolet 19 Toyota 3	Joey Gase Motorsports with Scott Osteen	53	Tyler Tomassi	Jim Gase 1 Garrett Harrington 9 Shannon Shehan 11; Jason Miller 2	2	
Chevrolet 19 Toyota 3	Joey Gase Motorsports with Scott Osteen	53	Glen Reen	Jim Gase 1 Garrett Harrington 9 Shannon Shehan 11; Jason Miller 2	2	
Chevrolet 19 Toyota 3	Joey Gase Motorsports with Scott Osteen	53	Blake Lothian	Jim Gase 1 Garrett Harrington 9 Shannon Shehan 11; Jason Miller 2	2	
Chevrolet 19 Toyota 3	Joey Gase Motorsports with Scott Osteen	53	Carson Ware	Jim Gase 1 Garrett Harrington 9 Shannon Shehan 11; Jason Miller 2	3	
Chevrolet 19 Toyota 3	Joey Gase Motorsports with Scott Osteen	53	Austin J. Hill	Jim Gase 1 Garrett Harrington 9 Shannon Shehan 11; Jason Miller 2	1	
Chevrolet 19 Toyota 3	Joey Gase Motorsports with Scott Osteen	53	Derek Lemke	Jim Gase 1 Garrett Harrington 9 Shannon Shehan 11; Jason Miller 2	1	
Chevrolet 19 Toyota 3	Joey Gase Motorsports with Scott Osteen	53	Will Rodgers (Note: Entries are fielded in a collaboration with Big Machine Racing.)	Jim Gase 1 Garrett Harrington 9 Shannon Shehan 11; Jason Miller 2	3	
Chevrolet 5 Ford 11	RSS Racing	38	Patrick Emerling	R. B. Bracken	5	
Chevrolet 5 Ford 11	RSS Racing	38	Logan Bearden	R. B. Bracken	2	
Chevrolet 5 Ford 11	RSS Racing	38	J. J. Yeley	R. B. Bracken	7	
Chevrolet 5 Ford 11	RSS Racing	38	Ryan Sieg	R. B. Bracken	1	
Chevrolet 5 Ford 11	RSS Racing	38	Brad Perez	R. B. Bracken	1	

=== Team changes ===
- Kaulig Racing is pausing their O'Reilly Auto Parts Series program for the 2026 season.
- Sam Hunt Racing will field two full-time cars in 2026 with the No. 24 car expanding from being fielded part-time to full-time.
- Young's Motorsports will expand to two full-time cars with the addition of the No. 02 driven by Ryan Ellis.
- ARCA Menards Series team Sigma Performance Services announced the acquisition of AM Racing. The team, renamed to SPS Racing, planned to field an entry in the series but did not specify whether it would be full-time or part-time. However, it was later revealed that the purchase was not finalized, and SPS would return to the ARCA Menards Series with AM continuing its O'Reilly Series operations.
- Cope Family Racing partnered with Stanton Barrett Motorsports, a team returning to NASCAR for the first time since 2015 and the series for the first time since 2008, in 2026 and the team's car switched from the No. 70 to the No. 30, a number SBM ran in their previous stint in the series from 2007 to 2008. On January 5, 2026, Barrett–Cope Racing was announced as the merged team's new name.
- Viking Motorsports will field two full-time cars in 2026 with Anthony Alfredo driving the No. 96 car.
- After collaborating with Jordan Anderson Racing for two years to jointly field Austin Green's entries with them part-time, Peterson Racing will split from JAR and field their No. 87 car on their own in 2026 with Green and the team running full-time in the series for the first time.
- SS-Green Light Racing with BRK Racing renumbered their No. 14 car to the No. 0 for 2026. Garrett Smithley, who drove that car in the majority of the races in 2025 and will again in 2026, is synonymous with that number from when he drove it for JD Motorsports from 2016 to 2019.
- Jordan Anderson Racing will expand to three full time entries.

=== Driver changes ===
Rookies

- Brent Crews will run 29 races in the No. 19 for Joe Gibbs Racing.
- Lavar Scott, who ran full-time in the ARCA Menards Series for Rev Racing for two years, will run full-time for Alpha Prime Racing in their No. 45 car. He drove that car part-time in 2025.
- Patrick Staropoli, who in 2025 ran part-time for Sam Hunt Racing as well as part-time in the Truck and ARCA Series for Cook Racing Technologies and Venturini Motorsports, respectively, will run full-time in the No. 48 for Big Machine Racing, replacing Nick Sanchez.

Moving between series

- Connor Zilisch will move up to the NASCAR Cup Series in 2026 driving full-time for Trackhouse Racing.
- Leland Honeyman was initially set to move down to the ARCA Menards Series in 2026, driving for Nitro Motorsports. Both him and Thomas Annunziata, who did run full-time in ARCA in 2026, did not return to Barrett–Cope Racing in 2026.
- After running full-time with Kaulig Racing in 2025, Daniel Dye and Christian Eckes will both return to the Truck Series full-time in 2026. Dye will continue with Kaulig in the Truck Series with their Ram team while Eckes will return to McAnally-Hilgemann Racing, the team he drove for full-time for in the Truck Series in 2023 and 2024.

Moving teams

- Harrison Burton moved from AM Racing to Sam Hunt Racing for 2026.
- Parker Retzlaff moved from Alpha Prime Racing to Viking Motorsports for 2026. Retzlaff replaced Matt DiBenedetto.
- Josh Bilicki will not return to DGM Racing. He will join SS-Green Light Racing full-time for 2026.
- Josh Williams will return to DGM Racing full-time.
- Nick Sanchez will not return to Big Machine Racing for 2026.
- Anthony Alfredo moved from Young's Motorsports to Viking Motorsports for 2026.
- Austin Green will run full-time for Peterson Racing in their No. 87 car.

Moving to part-time schedule

- Connor Zilisch will run part-time for JR Motorsports in 2026, splitting the No. 1 car with Carson Kvapil.

=== Crew chief changes ===
- Rodney Childers, a longtime Cup Series crew chief who most notably worked with Kevin Harvick at Stewart–Haas Racing for several years as a crew chief in the series, will join JRM in 2026 as the crew chief of the No. 1 car in which Kvapil and Zilisch will share.
- Jim Pohlman, who was the crew chief for JRM's No. 7 car driven by Justin Allgaier, moved up to the Cup Series to crew chief the No. 8 Richard Childress Racing car driven by Kyle Busch.
- Danny Efland, who was the crew chief of the AM Racing No. 25 car in 2025, will move to Viking Motorsports where he will crew chief their No. 99 car in 2026. He replaces Pat Tryson, who became the head of the team's shop operations.
- With JRM hiring Rodney Childers to crew chief the No. 1 car, former No. 1 car crew chief Andrew Overstreet will move to their No. 7 car to replace Jim Pohlman who left the team to crew chief for RCR in the Cup Series.
- JRM crew chiefs Phillip Bell and Cory Shea switched cars for 2026, with Bell moving from the full-time No. 8 to the part-time No. 9 and Shea moving from the part-time No. 9 to the full-time No. 8.
- Aeden McHugh moved from the No. 70 with Cope Family Racing to the No. 28 with RSS Racing. George Church will replace McHugh as crew chief for the renumbered No. 30 car for CFR in their new partnership with Stanton Barrett Motorsports.
- Joshua Graham, who previously crew chiefed for McAnally-Hilgemann Racing in the Truck Series in 2025, will be the crew chief for Viking Motorsports' new No. 96 car driven by Anthony Alfredo. The two of them worked together in the series in 2024 at Our Motorsports in their No. 5 car.
- Joe Williams Jr, who crew chiefed the Alpha Prime Racing No. 4 car in 2025, will crew chief the new Hettinger Racing No. 5 car in 2026.
- Matt Weber, who was previously an engineer and crew chief for Our Motorsports, which closed down during the 2025 season, will be the new crew chief for Jeremy Clements' No. 51 car in 2026, replacing Kase Kallenbach.

=== Manufacturer changes ===
Haas Factory Team switched from Ford to Chevrolet in 2026, with a technical alliance with Hendrick Motorsports. RSS Racing switched from Ford to Chevrolet in 2026 to continue its existing technical alliance with Haas Factory Team.

=== Technical Changes ===
Jeremy Clements Racing will form a technical alliance with Haas Factory Team. Viking Motorsports and Jordan Anderson Racing formed technical alliance with Richard Childress Racing.

== Rule changes ==
=== Loosening Cup Series restriction ===
The amount of races full-time Cup drivers can run in the O'Reilly Auto Parts Series and Craftsman Truck Series was increased to ten and eight, respectively, up from the 2025 restriction of five in each series. Cup drivers remain ineligible for points, as well as unable to compete in the postseason events.

=== Age limit ===
The minimum age requirement to race in the O'Reilly Auto Parts series was lowered to 17 for road courses and oval tracks less than 1.25 miles in length. This change creates a staggered minimum age: 16 in Trucks, 17 in O'Reilly, and 18 in Cup series events.

=== Postseason format ===
NASCAR revealed a new postseason format in January 2026. Used in the top three series, it is a return of the Chase format previously used from 2004 to 2013 in the Cup Series. The top 12 drivers on points after 24 races will qualify for the Chase, with the 'win-and-you're-in' rule being scrapped, and starting points in the Chase will be staggered based on the regular season standings. This format replaced a derided playoff system, which included four "rounds" with points resets. With the change, playoff points are no longer awarded.

=== Fastest lap restriction ===
Drivers who enter the garage during a race will no longer be eligible for the fastest lap bonus point. If the driver's fastest lap was achieved before they entered the garage, it will still stand.

== Schedule ==
The 2026 schedule was released on August 20, 2025.

Bolded races indicate Dash 4 Cash race.

O Oval track
R Road course
S Street course

No	Race title	Track	Location	Date	Time (ET)	TV	Radio
1	United Rentals 300	O Daytona International Speedway	Daytona Beach, Florida	February 14	5 pm	CW	MRN
2	Bennett Transportation & Logistics 250	O Atlanta Motor Speedway	Hampton, Georgia	February 21	5 pm	CW	PRN
3	Focused Health 250	R Circuit of the Americas	Austin, Texas	February 28	3 pm	CW	PRN
4	GOVX 200	O Phoenix Raceway	Avondale, Arizona	March 7	7:30 pm	CW	MRN
5	The LiUNA!	O Las Vegas Motor Speedway	Las Vegas, Nevada	March 14	5:30 pm	CW	PRN
6	Sport Clips Haircuts VFW 200	O Darlington Raceway	Darlington, South Carolina	March 21	5:30 pm	CW	MRN
7	NFPA 250	O Martinsville Speedway	Ridgeway, Virginia	March 28	3:30 pm	CW	MRN
8	North Carolina Education Lottery 250	O Rockingham Speedway	Rockingham, North Carolina	April 4	2:30 pm	CW	MRN
9	**Suburban Propane 300**	O Bristol Motor Speedway	Bristol, Tennessee	April 11	7:30 pm	CW	PRN
10	**Kansas Lottery 300**	O Kansas Speedway	Kansas City, Kansas	April 18	7 pm	CW	MRN
11	**Ag-Pro 300**	O Talladega Superspeedway	Lincoln, Alabama	April 25	4 pm	CW	MRN
12	**Andy's Frozen Custard 340**	O Texas Motor Speedway	Fort Worth, Texas	May 2	3:30 pm	CW	PRN
13	Mission 200 at The Glen	R Watkins Glen International	Watkins Glen, New York	May 9	4 pm	CW	MRN
14	BetRivers 200	O Dover Motor Speedway	Dover, Delaware	May 16	4 pm	CW	PRN
15	Charbroil 300	O Charlotte Motor Speedway	Concord, North Carolina	May 23	5 pm	CW	PRN
16	Sports Illustrated Resorts 250	O Nashville Superspeedway	Lebanon, Tennessee	May 30	7:30 pm	CW	PRN
17	MillerTech Battery 250	O Pocono Raceway	Long Pond, Pennsylvania	June 13	4 pm	CW	MRN
18	United Rentals Driven to Serve 250	S Coronado Street Course	San Diego, California	June 20	5 pm	CW	MRN
19	Pit Boss/FoodMaxx 250	R Sonoma Raceway	Sonoma, California	June 27	5:30 pm	CW	PRN
20	Cuervo 300	O Chicagoland Speedway	Joliet, Illinois	July 4	5:30 pm	CW	MRN
21	Focused Health 250	O Atlanta Motor Speedway	Hampton, Georgia	July 11	7 pm	CW	PRN
22	Pennzoil 250	O Indianapolis Motor Speedway	Speedway, Indiana	July 25	4 pm	CW	PRN
23	Hy-Vee PERKS 250	O Iowa Speedway	Newton, Iowa	August 8	5 pm	CW	MRN
24	Winn-Dixie 250	O Daytona International Speedway	Daytona Beach, Florida	August 28	7:30 pm	CW	MRN
The Chase
25	Fleetio 200	O Darlington Raceway	Darlington, South Carolina	September 5	7:30 pm	CW	MRN
26	Nu Way 225	O World Wide Technology Raceway	Madison, Illinois	September 12	7:30 pm	CW	MRN
27	Food City 300	O Bristol Motor Speedway	Bristol, Tennessee	September 18	7:30 pm	CW	PRN
28	Focused Health 302	O Las Vegas Motor Speedway	Las Vegas, Nevada	October 3	7:30 pm	CW	PRN
29	Blue Cross NC 300	O Charlotte Motor Speedway	Concord, North Carolina	October 11* (Note: The Blue Cross NC 300 was originally scheduled on Saturday, October 10 at 4 pm, before being postponed to Sunday, October 11 at 8pm due to rain.)	8 pm	CW	PRN
30	Timberland PRO 200	O Phoenix Raceway	Avondale, Arizona	October 17	7:30 pm	CW	MRN
31	TPG 250	O Talladega Superspeedway	Lincoln, Alabama	October 24	3:30 pm	CW	MRN
32	National Debt Relief 250	O Martinsville Speedway	Ridgeway, Virginia	October 31	4 pm	CW	MRN
33	O'Reilly Auto Parts 300	O Homestead–Miami Speedway	Homestead, Florida	November 7	5 pm	CW	MRN

=== Schedule changes ===
Homestead–Miami Speedway will return to its traditional date as the finale for all three national series. The series will join the Craftsman Truck Series and the Cup Series at the Coronado Street Course. The series will not return to Portland International Raceway, Chicago Street Course, and Autódromo Hermanos Rodríguez. The series will return to Chicagoland Speedway for the first time since 2019, and the second Darlington race was readded after a one-year hiatus. The Charlotte Motor Speedway fall race will move away from the roval layout to the oval, after seven years as a road course race.

== Season summary ==
=== Regular season ===
Austin Hill won the pole at Daytona. Hill continued his dominance at Superspeedway tracks, winning both stages and the race. The win was Hill's fourth in five seasons at Daytona.

Sam Mayer won the pole at Atlanta. Jesse Love won stage 1, and Rajah Caruth won stage 2, his first career stage win in the O'Reilly series. On the final lap, Austin Hill was looking to defend his win from last year, however Ross Chastain knocked him off the racing line, giving Sheldon Creed his first career win after 15 runner up finishes.

Connor Zilisch won the pole at Austin, with his Cup Series teammate Shane van Gisbergen on the front row. Austin Hill won stage 1, and Sam Mayer won stage 2. Van Gisbergen dominated the race, leading a race-high 31 laps, ultimately winning the race.

Taylor Gray won the pole at Phoenix. Sammy Smith won stage 1, and Jesse Love won stage 2. Justin Allgaier passed Love late in the race, holding him off to win the race, becoming the first driver to win a race in the Nationwide, Xfinity, and O'Reilly era of the series.

Sam Mayer won the pole at Las Vegas. defending race winner Justin Allgaier swept the stages, Kyle Larson would end up winning the race.

Kyle Larson won the pole at Darlington. Larson dominated the race, sweeping the stages and leading all but 40 laps. Justin Allgaier controlled the race after the final restart leading the final 17, claiming his second consecutive win.

Justin Allgaier won the pole at Martinsville after qualifying was canceled due to rain. Allgaier won stage 1, and Austin Hill, the defending race winner, won stage 2. JR Motorsports would dominate the later half of the race, with Allgaier and Lee Pulliam leading majority of the laps "The Big One" would occur with 17 laps remaining, taking out several contenders. Allgaier would later win the race, claiming his second consecutive win.

Corey Day won his first career pole at Rockingham. Day would sweep the stages for the first time in his career. During stage 3, teenagers like Brent Crews and William Sawalich would dominate the later half of the race, Sawalich would hold off teammate Brandon Jones for his first career O'Reilly Auto Parts Series victory.

William Sawalich won the pole at Bristol. Kyle Larson swept the stages. After an intense, late race battle for the lead, involving Larson, Connor Zilisch and rookie Brent Crews, Zilisch was able to get the upper hand for the race, winning the event.

Rain at Kansas canceled qualifying, resulting with Carson Kvapil winning his first career pole. Kvapil was later involved in a scary flip down the backstretch on lap two. Brandon Jones swept the stages. Taylor Gray would later hold off a hard charging Sheldon Creed to get his second career win in the O'Reilly series.

Jesse Love won the pole at Talladega. Carson Kvapil won stage one, and Justin Allgaier won stage two. After an exciting, action-packed race, Corey Day held off the field after a caution came out to earn his first career O'Reilly Series victory.

Justin Allgaier won the pole at Texas. Allgaier won stage one, and Connor Zilisch won stage two. defending race winner Kyle Larson would hold off a hard charging Allgaier for his second win in the season.

Rain at Waktins Glen canceled qualifying, with Rajah Caruth winning the pole. Brent Crews won stage one, and Connor Zilisch won stage two. Zilisch's friend, Jesse Love would lead coming out of the white flag, however would lock up the brakes coming into the final turn and finish in second, with Zilisch claiming his third consecutive win at Watkins Glen International.

Ross Chastain won the pole at Dover. Brandon Jones won stage one, and Chastain won stage two. The beginning of stage three was filled with cautions, however that would later end, as Corey Day hunted down Justin Allgaier during the last 30 laps to win in his first O'Reilly race at Dover Motor Speedway.

Rain at Charlotte canceled qualifying, with Justin Allgaier winning the pole. Connor Zilisch won stage one after a 4-hour long red flag due to rain, and Ross Chastain won stage two. The race was deemed official following the conclusion of stage two, after just 35 green flag laps.

Rain at Nashville canceled qualifying, with Jesse Love winning the pole. Love won stage one, and Justin Allgaier won stage two. Allgaier passed rookie Brent Crews late in the race, holding off Crews for his third win at Nashville Superspeedway.

Brandon Jones won the pole at Pocono. Taylor Gray won stage one while Brent Crews won stage two. Justin Allgaier won the race and clinched a spot in the chase.

Brent Crews won the pole at Coronado. Austin Hill won stage one while Taylor Gray won stage two. Hill won the race. The race was also marred by a manhole cover becoming unwelded and hitting Corey Day's car, and on lap 34, "the big one" happened when Sam Mayer accidentally clipped the inside wall in turn one, sending him up the track and slamming into the outside wall.

Shane van Gisbergen won the pole at Sonoma. Anthony Alfredo won stage one while Connor Zilisch won stage two. van Gisbergen won the race, with his win the next day, van Gisbergen swept the weekend.

Rain at Chicagoland canceled qualifying, with Connor Zilisch winning the pole. Zilisch won stage one, while Chase Elliott won stage two. Brandon Jones won, as the race got extended to overtime holding off Elliott.

Sam Mayer won the pole at Atlanta. Carson Kvapil won stage one, while Justin Allgaier edged ahead of teammate Sammy Smith by .003 seconds to win stage two. In Stage 3, on Lap 159, a caution caused the race to go into an Overtime finish. Allgaier won the race in the second overtime attempt and clinched the regular season championship.

Sheldon Creed won the pole at Indianapolis. Jeremy Clements won Stage 1, while Rajah Caruth won Stage 2. Carson Kvapil won his first NOAPS race with a 1-2-3-4 JRM finish.

Ryan Sieg won the pole at Iowa. Ryan Sieg won Stage 1, and Justin Allgaier won Stage 2. On lap 235, Jeb Burton spun causing the race to go into Overtime. On the first overtime attempt, Brent Crews got loose and caused The Big One. On the second overtime attempt, Carson Kvapil was able to take the lead and win his second race back-to-back.

Rajah Caruth won the pole at Daytona, his first career pole win. Austin Hill won stage one, and Caruth won stage two. After a late-race caution on lap 97 occurred, Ryan Sieg would pull off a massive upset, holding off the charging JR Motorsports cars for his first career win in his 424th start, and second ever win, after the 2023 DoorDash 250 for his team, RSS Racing.

=== The Chase ===
Carson Kvapil won the pole at Darlington. Justin Allgaier won stage one, Sheldon Creed won stage two. Creed led 53 laps and won his second career win.

Carson Kvapil won the pole at Gateway. Kvapil won stage one while Jesse Love won stage two. Love won the race.

Qualifying was cancelled due to rain at Bristol, with Jesse Love winning the pole. Justin Allgaier won stage one while Carson Kvapil won stage two. In a NASCAR Overtime finish, Sheldon Creed, took advantage of fresher tires, and surged past William Sawalich for the lead. leading the final three laps to earn his third career NOAPS win, his third of the season, and took the points lead.

Corey Day won the pole at Las Vegas. Day won stage one while Sam Mayer won stage two. Leading 136 laps, Day won the race. Brandon Jones was disqualified for having four or more lug nuts not safe & secure.

Qualifying was cancelled due to rain at Charlotte, with Carson Kvapil winning the pole. The race was postponed from Saturday due to rain and held on Sunday evening. Corey Day won stage one, while Justin Allgaier won stage two. Day made a late charge to the lead after an early pit road penalty, and held off Jesse Love in the final laps to earn his fourth career NOAPS Series win, his fourth of the season, and his second consecutive win.

Jesse Love won the pole at Phoenix. Love swept both stages and won the race and took the points lead.

Jesse Love won the pole at Talladega. Carson Kvapil won stage one while Justin Allgaier won stage two. Sammy Smith earn his fourth career NOAPS Series win, and his first of the season.

Carson Kvapil won the pole at Martinsville in a JR Motorsports 1–2–3. Justin Allgaier won stage one while Anthony Alfredo won stage two. Kvapil earned his third career NOAPS series win, and his third of the season.

Sheldon Creed won the pole at Homestead. Sam Mayer won stage one while Brandon Jones won stage two. Brandon Jones made a late pass and led the remaining 13 laps to earn his ninth career NOAPS series win, and his second of the season while Justin Allgaier won his second NOAPS series title 14 points ahead of Jesse Love.

== Results and standings ==
=== Race results ===
No.	Race	Pole position	Most laps led	Fastest race lap	Winning driver	Winning team	No.	Manufacturer	Report
1	United Rentals 300	Austin Hill	Austin Hill	Rajah Caruth	Austin Hill	Richard Childress Racing	21	Chevrolet	Report
2	Bennett Transportation & Logistics 250	Sam Mayer	Austin Hill	Jeb Burton	Sheldon Creed	Haas Factory Team	00	Chevrolet	Report
3	Focused Health 250	Connor Zilisch	Shane van Gisbergen	Shane van Gisbergen	Shane van Gisbergen	JR Motorsports	9	Chevrolet	Report
4	GOVX 200	Taylor Gray	Jesse Love	Jesse Love	Justin Allgaier	JR Motorsports	7	Chevrolet	Report
5	The LiUNA!	Sam Mayer	Justin Allgaier	Sam Mayer	Kyle Larson	JR Motorsports	88	Chevrolet	Report
6	Sport Clips Haircuts VFW 200	Kyle Larson	Kyle Larson	Justin Allgaier	Justin Allgaier	JR Motorsports	7	Chevrolet	Report
7	NFPA 250	Justin Allgaier	Justin Allgaier	Justin Allgaier	Justin Allgaier	JR Motorsports	7	Chevrolet	Report
8	North Carolina Education Lottery 250	Corey Day	Corey Day	William Sawalich	William Sawalich	Joe Gibbs Racing	18	Toyota	Report
9	Suburban Propane 300	William Sawalich	Kyle Larson	Brent Crews	Connor Zilisch	JR Motorsports	1	Chevrolet	Report
10	Kansas Lottery 300	Carson Kvapil	Brandon Jones	Sheldon Creed	Taylor Gray	Joe Gibbs Racing	54	Toyota	Report
11	Ag-Pro 300	Jesse Love	Jesse Love	Jeremy Clements	Corey Day	Hendrick Motorsports	17	Chevrolet	Report
12	Andy's Frozen Custard 340	Justin Allgaier	Kyle Larson	Justin Allgaier	Kyle Larson	JR Motorsports	88	Chevrolet	Report
13	Mission 200 at The Glen	Rajah Caruth	Brent Crews	Brent Crews	Connor Zilisch	JR Motorsports	1	Chevrolet	Report
14	BetRivers 200	Ross Chastain	Justin Allgaier	William Sawalich	Corey Day	Hendrick Motorsports	17	Chevrolet	Report
15	Charbroil 300	Justin Allgaier	Justin Allgaier	Ross Chastain	Ross Chastain	JR Motorsports	9	Chevrolet	Report
16	Sports Illustrated Resorts 250	Jesse Love	Jesse Love	Justin Allgaier	Justin Allgaier	JR Motorsports	7	Chevrolet	Report
17	MillerTech Battery 250	Brandon Jones	Justin Allgaier	Justin Allgaier	Justin Allgaier	JR Motorsports	7	Chevrolet	Report
18	United Rentals Driven to Serve 250	Brent Crews	Taylor Gray	Carson Kvapil	Austin Hill	Richard Childress Racing	21	Chevrolet	Report
19	Pit Boss/FoodMaxx 250	Shane van Gisbergen	Shane van Gisbergen	Connor Zilisch	Shane van Gisbergen	JR Motorsports	9	Chevrolet	Report
20	Cuervo 300	Connor Zilisch	Chase Elliott	Connor Zilisch	Brandon Jones	Joe Gibbs Racing	20	Toyota	Report
21	Focused Health 250	Sam Mayer	Sammy Smith	Brandon Jones	Justin Allgaier	JR Motorsports	7	Chevrolet	Report
22	Pennzoil 250	Sheldon Creed	Ross Chastain	Justin Allgaier	Carson Kvapil	JR Motorsports	1	Chevrolet	Report
23	Hy-Vee PERKS 250	Ryan Sieg	Justin Allgaier	Ross Chastain	Carson Kvapil	JR Motorsports	1	Chevrolet	Report
24	Winn-Dixie 250	Rajah Caruth	Carson Kvapil	Sam Mayer	Ryan Sieg	RSS Racing	38	Chevrolet	Report
NASCAR O'Reilly Auto Parts Series Chase
25	Fleetio 200	Carson Kvapil	Justin Allgaier	Carson Kvapil	Sheldon Creed	Haas Factory Team	00	Chevrolet	Report
26	Nu Way 225	Carson Kvapil	Carson Kvapil	Jesse Love	Jesse Love	Richard Childress Racing	2	Chevrolet	Report
27	Food City 300	Jesse Love	Carson Kvapil	Taylor Gray	Sheldon Creed	Haas Factory Team	00	Chevrolet	Report
28	Focused Health 302	Corey Day	Corey Day	Corey Day	Corey Day	Hendrick Motorsports	17	Chevrolet	Report
29	Blue Cross NC 300	Carson Kvapil	Jesse Love	Jesse Love	Corey Day	Hendrick Motorsports	17	Chevrolet	Report
30	Timberland PRO 200	Jesse Love	Jesse Love	Justin Allgaier	Jesse Love	Richard Childress Racing	2	Chevrolet	Report
31	TPG 250	Jesse Love	Carson Kvapil	Brennan Poole	Sammy Smith	JR Motorsports	8	Chevrolet	Report
32	National Debt Relief 250	Carson Kvapil	Carson Kvapil	Carson Kvapil	Carson Kvapil	JR Motorsports	1	Chevrolet	Report
33	O'Reilly Auto Parts 300	Sheldon Creed	Sheldon Creed	Sheldon Creed	Brandon Jones	Joe Gibbs Racing	20	Toyota	Report

=== Drivers' championship ===
(key) Bold – Pole position awarded by time. Italics – Pole position set by final practice results or owner's points. * – Most laps led. ^{F} – Fastest lap. ^{1} – Stage 1 winner. ^{2} – Stage 2 winner

Pos	Driver	DAY	ATL	COA	PHO	LVS	DAR	MAR	ROC	BRI	KAN	TAL	TEX	GLN	DOV	CLT	NSH	POC	COR	SON	CHI	ATL	IND	IOW	DAY	DAR	GTW	BRI	LVS	CLT	PHO	TAL	MAR	HOM	Pts.	Stage
1	Justin Allgaier	2	33	8	1	4*^{12}	1^{F}	1*^{1F}	3	4	3	23^{2}	**2**^{1F}	10	2*	29*	1^{2F}	1*	32	26	6	1^{2}	2^{F}	24*^{2}	6	17*^{2}	13	4^{1}	34	4^{2}	3^{F}	4^{2}	2^{1}	7	2477	438
2	Jesse Love	9	5^{1}	4	2*^{2F}	6	11	12	27	12	4	**7***	9	2	23	2	16*^{1}	37	6	9	3	26	16	35	20	13	1^{2F}	17	3	2*^{F}	**1***^{12}	**3**	30	4	2463	286
3	Carson Kvapil	7	32	19	3	11	5	28	5	5	37	22^{1}	11	14	7	9	7	10	4^{F}	6	11	2^{1}	1	1	3*	**12**^{F}	**5***^{1}	24*^{2}	2	32	10	2*^{1}	**1***^{F}	2	2449	303
4	Sheldon Creed	24	1	11	4	3	7	4	6	6	2^{F}	3	6	29	18	32	15	5	3	10	16	25	**8**	5	10	1	2	1	13	3	32	5	6	**6***^{F}	2444	215
5	Corey Day	27	4	5	9	8	6	2	**10***^{12}	8	12	1	37	15	1	5	6	38	10	7	19	32	7	36	29	2	33	5	**1***^{1F}	1^{1}	4	6	3	34	2416	219
6	Sam Mayer	31	**7**	14^{2}	5	**35**^{F}	10	23	38	20	9	24	3	13	3	36	4	4	34	8	8	**31**	13	21	25^{F}	8	3	7	6^{2}	24	2	13	5	9^{12}	2387	262
7	Sammy Smith	5	30	3	6^{1}	5	9	3	12	13	16	4	13	16	9	11	10	19	5	11	13	18*	19	17	36	4	8	10	15	16	5	1	7	15	2352	155
8	Brandon Jones	30	10	15	16	13	2	18	2	19	8*^{12}	8	8	5	6^{1}	35	5	**8**	12	36	1	7^{F}	9	14	5	10	15	15	36	6	6	9	4	1	2314	152
9	Taylor Gray	28	9	12	**15**	37	15	13	7	10	1	29	33	3	32	31	9	17^{1}	2*^{2}	29	7	33	12	7	26	7	4	6^{F}	5	9	28	21	10	14	2300	163
10	Austin Hill	**1***^{12}	12*	2^{1}	12	10	35	6^{2}	11	21	34	13	7	11	5	3	11	14	1^{1}	22	5	22	10	11	2^{1}	5	29	22	9	7	15	35	31	8	2281	170
11	Parker Retzlaff	14	2	30	14	12	8	11	8	9	36	9	5	7	38	12	12	15	7	5	14	3	11	13	14	21	6	8	19	12	11	31	15	5	2263	108
12	Rajah Caruth	10^{F}	8^{2}	31	8	19	23	25	4	14	21	30	34	12	14	10	19	7	22	14	24	9	22^{2}	2	**32**^{2}	26	11	23	11	36	9	17	16	18	2224	169
NASCAR O'Reilly Auto Parts Series Chase cut-off
Pos	Driver	DAY	ATL	COA	PHO	LVS	DAR	MAR	ROC	BRI	KAN	TAL	TEX	GLN	DOV	CLT	NSH	POC	COR	SON	CHI	ATL	IND	IOW	DAY	DAR	GTW	BRI	LVS	CLT	PHO	TAL	MAR	HOM	Pts.	Stage
13	Brent Crews **(R)**			6	18			10	26	3^{F}	5	2	4	6*^{1F}	22	37	2	2^{2}	**31**	3	4	24	6	16	35	3	7	3	4	30	20	34	9	3	878	177
14	William Sawalich	26	23	7	37	9	17	20	1^{F}	**7**	20	28	15	36	4^{F}	4	3	21	36	13	29	4	5	3	37	30	16	2	8	11	8	29	8	10	838	121
15	Ryan Sieg	3	37	16	17	33	13	9	9	11	10	21	14	23	8	7	13	26	11	15	31	16	17	**33**^{1}	1	19	14	30	12	17	23	14	11	12	758	63
16	Anthony Alfredo	11	25	23	10	34	12	15	24	36	30	31	12	24	10	13	17	6	35	4^{1}	26	5	14	19	4	6^{1}	22	32	10	8	17	10	17^{2}	19	735	95
17	Dean Thompson	35	11	26	25	31	21	7	28	24	11	6	16	35	20	14	14	13	28	28	17	14	21	8	27	11	12	9	16	14	7	8	32	33	620	21
18	Brennan Poole	12	19	10	27	20	18	14	14	18	19	15	20	18	11	27	21	18	24	24	25	17	29	10	7	15	19	13	17	10	35	26^{F}	20	27	605	2
19	Harrison Burton	29	35	29	23	17	22	26	13	17	28	26	22	17	16	38	27	11	9	18	15	34	18	9	8	20	35	12	14	13	13	24	12	23	571	22
20	Jeremy Clements	32	29	32	11	24	19	37	25	15	15	5^{F}	10	33	15	30	18	16	15	20	35	10	37^{1}	30	33	9	31	14	7	20	12	18	29	25	570	57
21	Jeb Burton	25	16^{F}	18	7	27	26	30	17	16	13	25	26	25	37	22	23	28	17	21	20	38	15	27	9	33	10	25	21	22	16	11	13	22	547	24
22	Blaine Perkins	8	36	17	28	22	30	17	23	22	23	12	25	26	34	24	20	20	13	30	32	20	28	20	15	22	20	34	31	19	24	7	33	28	472	14
23	Patrick Staropoli **(R)**	18	13	20	26	21	29	16	34	27	14	37	17	38	21	18	25	25	20	25	27	13	23	18	34	32	17	26	24	33	21	32	19	17	444	–
24	Kyle Sieg	15	38	24	24	14	37	34	37	25	25	18	30	31	17	19	24	32	37	31	30	8	24	12	21	16	9	20	20	35	25	28	21	11	436	2
25	Josh Bilicki	17	15	36	30	23	20	35	36	23	26	14	27	22	27	25	32	22	16	16	36	12	33	31	28	24	26	31	30	18	36	16	24	30	386	2
26	Lavar Scott **(R)**	16	28	22	33	26	36	22	15	32	18	27	19	27	36	17	31	29	29	32	28	21	27	28	18	31	30	36	26	27	19	DNQ	18	21	362	–
27	Ryan Ellis	6	22	34	38	30	32	36	22	30	22	36	24	34	25	21	29	24	30	23	22	23	32	23	17	37	24	27	29	34	18	30	38	29	325	–
28	Austin Green	22	21	33	22	25	28	29	33	35	32	10	35	9	12	16	30		8	12										23					276	8
29	Joey Gase	DNQ	34		19	29	31	24	31	31	27	19	28			23	36	36	23		34	37	36	22	23	29	27		27	15	33	20	25	26	255	–
30	Garrett Smithley	DNQ	14		29		27	27	29	38		20	31		31		33				18	6	25	29	12	25		33	25	29	31	27	35	37	243	–
31	Josh Williams	34	27	DNQ	DNQ	16	24	32	19	29	17	35	18							27					11		18	28	28		26	23		20	234	–
32	Mason Maggio	38	26		32	28				37	33	17	32				28					11	26	34	19	35	21		33	26		12	36	36	183	–
33	Andrew Patterson							31	21						19	28			14									19	22		14			31	134	–
34	Alex Labbé			13			38		18					19					27	19													22		108	3
35	Lee Pulliam							5																					18			22	14		89	–
36	Will Rodgers													20						17											29	25		13	85	4
37	J. J. Yeley			28			25		20	26		11				34	38				37		38					38		38				38	84	–
38	Nathan Byrd				31	32	34		16		24					26		35					31	25											79	–
39	Preston Pardus			27										21					18				30			23								24	79	–
40	Myatt Snider					DNQ	33	19							24						23						25			25					73	–
41	Dawson Cram		DNQ		36	DNQ	Wth	DNQ	35		29	34	38		28	33	34		21	33	38		Wth		DNQ	36	36		35	37	37		28	35	69	–
42	Carson Ware	19																27				36		37	24			29				DNQ	23		65	–
43	Jake Finch																					30				18		11		31	38	38			63	3
44	Brad Perez			RL^{‡}				21		RL^{¶}			36						19	38						38	28				27			32	61	–
45	Jordan Anderson	4																				27					23								57	–
46	Carson Brown																							15						5					54	–
47	Logan Bearden									33					35		26					35				28		18							47	–
48	David Starr	DNQ										38	29		33	20	37						35					35							35	–
49	Blake Lothian				DNQ				30	34	31				26								34						32						35	–
50	Glen Reen													30								15				34									32	–
51	Luke Fenhaus **(R)**	23	20																																31	–
52	Matt DiBenedetto						DNQ																						23	21					30	–
53	Baltazar Leguizamón			37															33														27		15	–
54	Jesse Iwuji																		25																12	–
55	Gray Gaulding									28																									9	–
56	Alex Guenette													28																					9	–
57	Tyler Tomassi																				33			32											9	–
58	Austin J. Hill			38	34																						32								9	–
59	C. J. McLaughlin														30																				7	–
60	Dexter Bean																	30																	7	–
61	Andy Jankowiak																								30										7	–
62	Caesar Bacarella	QL^{†}																							31							37			7	–
63	Garrett Mitchell								32								35																		7	–
64	Derek White													32																					5	–
65	Kyle Kelley																			34															3	–
66	Sage Karam			35																															2	–
67	Matt Wilson													37																					1	–
	Tyler Gonzalez			DNQ																																–
	Landon S. Huffman																											DNQ								–
Ineligible for O'Reilly Auto Parts Series driver points
Pos	Driver	DAY	ATL	COA	PHO	LVS	DAR	MAR	ROC	BRI	KAN	TAL	TEX	GLN	DOV	CLT	NSH	POC	COR	SON	CHI	ATL	IND	IOW	DAY	DAR	GTW	BRI	LVS	CLT	PHO	TAL	MAR	HOM	Pts.	Stage
	Shane van Gisbergen			1*^{F}										8						**1***																
	Kyle Larson					1	**4***^{12}			2*^{12}			1*				8																			
	Connor Zilisch			**21**		7				1			21^{2}	1^{2}		6^{1}		9		2^{2F}	10^{1F}															
	Ross Chastain		6	9			14	8						4	**13**^{2}	1^{2F}				37			3*	4^{F}												
	Chase Briscoe					2																														
	Chase Elliott																				2*^{2}		4													
	Nick Sanchez	36	3	25	35	38	16	33	Wth									23			12	19	20	6	16	14	34	16			22			16		
	Christopher Bell						3																													
	William Byron				13						6							3																		
	Cole Custer					18					7					8		12			9															
	Patrick Emerling	13										16						31														DNQ	37			
	Leland Honeyman															15	22	33	26	35	21	28			13						34	36				
	Daniel Dye	21			20	15																			38	27						33	34			
	Nick Leitz		18																			29										15				
	Chad Finchum		17			DNQ																														
	Connor Mosack																														30	19				
	Carson Hocevar	20																																		
	Chandler Smith				21	36																														
	Stefan Parsons																											21								
	Natalie Decker	33										33						34							22			37								
	Austin Dillon												23																							
	Gio Ruggiero	37	24																																	
	Derek Lemke																							26						28						
	Justin Carroll							DNQ																									26			
	B. J. McLeod														29																					
	Cody Ware		31																																	
	Tyler Ankrum											32																								
	Luke Baldwin							38			35																									
Pos	Driver	DAY	ATL	COA	PHO	LVS	DAR	MAR	ROC	BRI	KAN	TAL	TEX	GLN	DOV	CLT	NSH	POC	COR	SON	CHI	ATL	IND	IOW	DAY	DAR	GTW	BRI	LVS	CLT	PHO	TAL	MAR	HOM	Pts.	Stage
^{†} – Qualified but replaced by Anthony Alfredo^{‡} – Relieved J. J. Yeley. Since Yeley started the race, he is officially credited with 28th place.^{¶} – Relieved Logan Bearden. Since Bearden started the race, he is officially credited with 33rd place.

=== Owners' championship (Top 15) ===
(key) Bold – Pole position awarded by time. Italics – Pole position set by final practice results or owner's points. * – Most laps led. ^{F} – Fastest lap. ^{1} – Stage 1 winner. ^{2} – Stage 2 winner

Pos.	No.	Car Owner	DAY	ATL	COA	PHO	LVS	DAR	MAR	ROC	BRI	KAN	TAL	TEX	GLN	DOV	CLT	NSH	POC	COR	SON	CHI	ATL	IND	IOW	DAY	DAR	GTW	BRI	LVS	CLT	PHO	TAL	MAR	HOM	Points
1	7	Kelley Earnhardt Miller	2	33	8	1	4*^{12}	1^{F}	1*^{1F}	3	4	3	23^{2}	**2**^{1F}	10	2*	29*	1^{2F}	1*^{F}	32	26	6	1^{2}	2^{F}	24*^{2}	6	17*^{2}	13	4^{1}	34	4^{2}	3^{F}	4^{2}	2^{1}	7	2477
2	2	Richard Childress	9	5^{1}	4	2*^{2F}	6	11	12	27	12	4	**7***	9	2	23	2	16*^{1}	37	6	9	3	26	16	35	20	13	1^{2F}	17	3	2*^{F}	**1***^{12}	**3**	30	4	2458
3	1	L. W. Miller	7	32	**21**	3	11	5	28	5	1	37	22^{1}	21^{2}	1^{2}	7	6^{1}	7	9	4^{F}	2^{2F}	10^{1F}	2^{1}	1	1	3*	**12**^{F}	**5***^{1}	24*^{2}	2	32	10	2*^{1}	**1***^{F}	2	2449
4	00	Gene Haas	24	1	11	4	3	7	4	6	6	2^{F}	3	6	29	18	32	15	5	3	10	16	25	**8**	5	10	1	2	1	13	3	32	5	6	**6***^{F}	2439
5	17	Rick Hendrick	27	4	5	9	8	6	2	**10***^{12}	8	12	1	37	15	1	5	6	38	10	7	19	32	7	36	29	2	33	5	**1***^{1F}	1^{1}	4	6	3	34	2411
6	41	Gene Haas	31	**7**	14^{2}	5	**35**^{F}	10	23	38	20	9	25	3	13	3	35	4	4	34	8	8	**31**	13	21	25^{F}	8	3	7	6^{2}	24	2	13	5	9^{12}	2377
7	8	Dale Earnhardt Jr.	5	30	3	6^{1}	5	9	3	12	13	16	4	13	16	9	11	10	19	5	11	13	18*	19	17	36	4	8	10	15	16	5	1	7	15	2342
8	19	Joe Gibbs	37	24	6	18	2	3	10	26	3^{F}	5	2	4	6*^{1F}	22	37	2	2^{2}	**31**	3	4	24	6	16	35	3	7	3	4	30	20	34	9	3	2313
9	20	Joe Gibbs	30	10	15	16	13	2	18	2	19	8*^{12}	8	8	5	6^{1}	36	5	**8**	12	36	1	7	9	14	5	10	15	15	36	6	6	9	4	1	2309
10	21	Richard Childress	**1***^{12}	12*	2^{1}	12	10	35	6^{2}	11	21	34	13	7	11	5	3	11	14	1*^{1}	22	5	22	10	11	2^{1}	5	29	22	9	7	15	35	31	8	2276
11	88	Rick Hendrick	10^{F}	8^{2}	31	13	1	**4***^{12}	25	4	2*^{12}	6	30	1*	12	14	10	8	3	22	14	2*^{2}	9	4	2	**32**^{2}	26	11	23	11	36	9	17	16	18	2269
12	99	Don Sackett	14	2	30	14	12	8	11	8	9	36	9	5	7	38	12	12	15	7	5	14	3	11	13	14	21	6	8	19	12	11	31	15	5	2253
NASCAR O'Reilly Auto Parts Series Chase cut-off
13	54	Ty Gibbs	28	9	12	**15**	37	15	13	7	10	1	29	33	3	32	31	9	17^{1}	2^{2}	29	7	33	12	7	26	7	4	6^{F}	5	9	28	21	10	14	884
14	18	Joe Gibbs	26	23	7	37	9	17	20	1^{F}	**7**	20	28	15	36	4^{F}	4	3	21	36	13	29	4	5	3	37	30	16	2	8	11	8	29	8	10	838
15	39	Rod Sieg	3	37	16	17	33	13	9	9	11	10	21	14	23	8	7	13	26	11	15	31	16	17	**33**^{1}	30	19	14	30	12	17	23	14	11	12	710
Pos.	No.	Car Owner	DAY	ATL	COA	PHO	LVS	DAR	MAR	ROC	BRI	KAN	TAL	TEX	GLN	DOV	CLT	NSH	POC	COR	SON	CHI	ATL	IND	IOW	DAY	DAR	GTW	BRI	LVS	CLT	PHO	TAL	MAR	HOM	Points

=== Manufacturers' championship ===
Pos	Manufacturer	Wins	Points
1	Chevrolet	29	1734
2	Toyota	4	1143
3	Ford	0	309

== See also ==
- 2026 NASCAR Cup Series
- 2026 NASCAR Craftsman Truck Series
- 2026 ARCA Menards Series
- 2026 ARCA Menards Series East
- 2026 ARCA Menards Series West
- 2026 NASCAR Whelen Modified Tour
- 2026 NASCAR Euro Series
- 2026 NASCAR Canada Series
- 2026 NASCAR Brasil Series
