= 2026 Blue Cross NC 300 =

NASCAR O'Reilly Auto Parts Series race at Charlotte Motor Speedway

Race details
- Race 29 of 33 in the 2026 NASCAR O'Reilly Auto Parts Series
- Date: October 11, 2026
- Location: Charlotte Motor Speedway in Concord, North Carolina
- Course: Permanent racing facility
- Course length: 1.5 miles (2.4 km)
- Distance: 200 laps, 300 mi (482.803 km)
- Average speed: 121.471 miles per hour (195.489 km/h)

Pole position
| Driver | Carson Kvapil | JR Motorsports |
- Grid positions set by competition-based formula

Most laps led
| Driver | Jesse Love | Richard Childress Racing |
- Laps: 80

Fastest lap
| Driver | Jesse Love | Richard Childress Racing |
- Time: 30.442

Winner
| No. 17 | Corey Day | Hendrick Motorsports |

Television in the United States
- Network: The CW
- Announcers: Adam Alexander, Jamie McMurray, and Parker Kligerman

Radio in the United States
- Radio: PRN
- Booth announcers: Brad Gillie and Nick Yeoman
- Turn announcers: Andrew Kurland (1 & 2) and Pat Patterson (3 & 4)

The 2026 Blue Cross NC 300 was a NASCAR O'Reilly Auto Parts Series race held on Sunday, October 11, 2026, postponed from Saturday, October 10, due to rain at Charlotte Motor Speedway in Concord, North Carolina. Contested over 200 laps on the 1.5-mile (2.4 km) asphalt speedway, it was the fifteenth race of the 2026 NASCAR O'Reilly Auto Parts Series season, the fifth race in the NASCAR Chase, and the 37th running of the event.

Corey Day, driving for Hendrick Motorsports, made a late charge to the lead after an early pit road penalty, and held off Jesse Love in the final laps to earn his fourth career NASCAR O'Reilly Auto Parts Series win, his fourth of the season, and his second consecutive win. Day won the first stage, leading 55 laps, while Justin Allgaier won the second stage, leading 54 laps. Love finished second in both stages and led the race-high 80 laps. At race's end, Love finished second, and Sheldon Creed finished third. Allgaier and Carson Brown rounded out the top five, while Brandon Jones, Austin Hill, Anthony Alfredo, Taylor Gray, and Brennan Poole rounded out the top ten.

== Report ==
=== Background ===
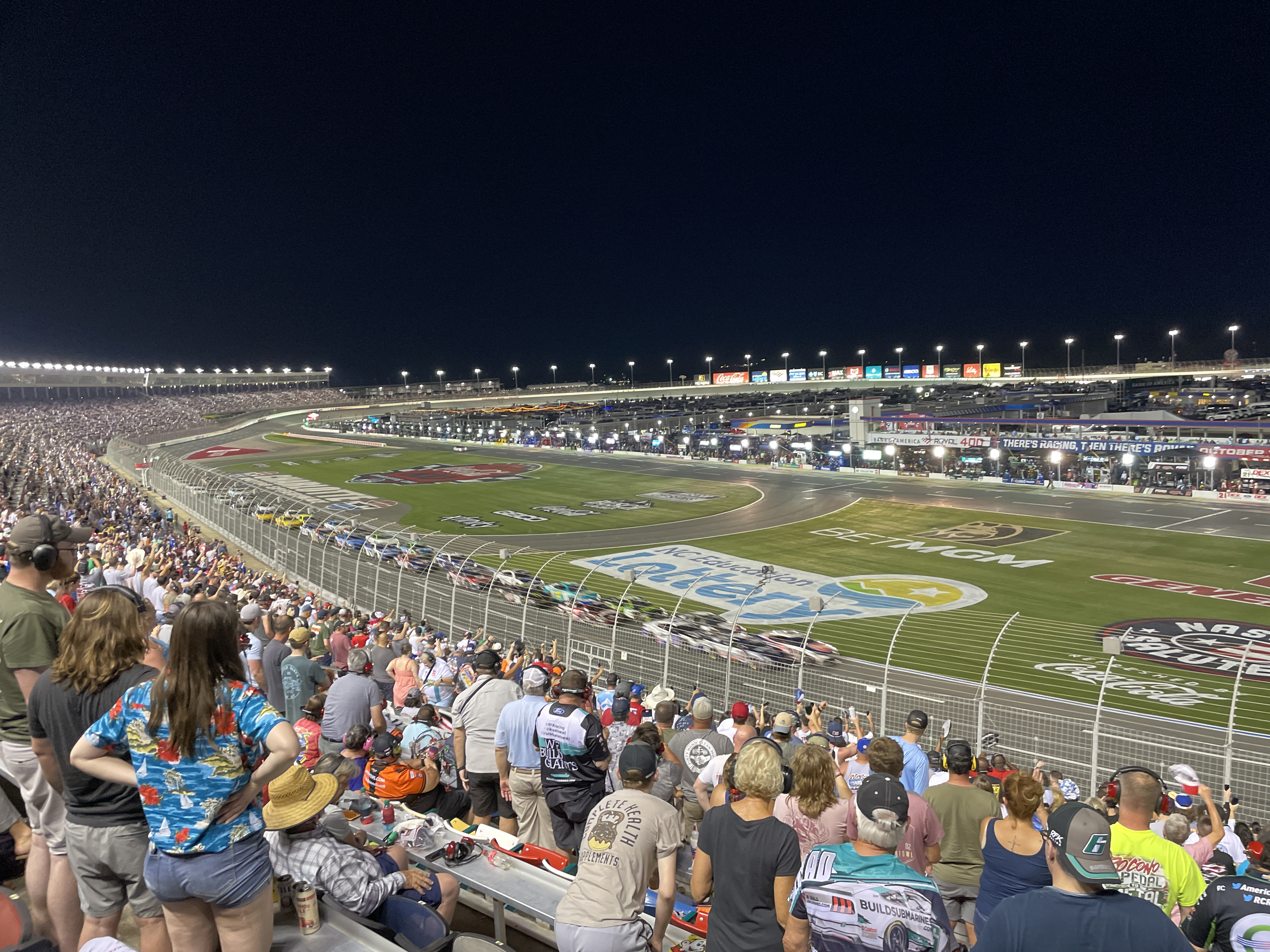
Charlotte Motor Speedway, the track where the race was held.

The race was held at Charlotte Motor Speedway, located in Concord, North Carolina. The speedway complex includes a 1.5-mile (2.4 km) quad-oval track that was utilized for the race, as well as a dragstrip and a dirt track. The speedway was built in 1959 by Bruton Smith and is considered the home track for NASCAR with many race teams based in the Charlotte metropolitan area. The track is owned and operated by Speedway Motorsports Inc. (SMI) with Marcus G. Smith serving as track president.

The fall Charlotte race was originally announced to be held on the Roval configuration, but news broke that in February that it would move to the oval track.

Blue Cross NC was announced as the title sponsor on June 27, 2025.

==== Entry list ====
- (R) denotes rookie driver.
- (i) denotes driver who is ineligible for series driver points.
- (CC) denotes chase contender.
- (OC) denotes owners' chase contender car.

| # | Driver | Team | Make |
|---|---|---|---|
| 00 | Sheldon Creed (CC) | Haas Factory Team | Chevrolet |
| 0 | Garrett Smithley | SS-Green Light Racing | Chevrolet |
| 1 | Carson Kvapil (CC) | JR Motorsports | Chevrolet |
| 02 | Ryan Ellis | Young's Motorsports | Chevrolet |
| 2 | Jesse Love (CC) | Richard Childress Racing | Chevrolet |
| 07 | Josh Bilicki | SS-Green Light Racing | Chevrolet |
| 7 | Justin Allgaier (CC) | JR Motorsports | Chevrolet |
| 8 | Sammy Smith (CC) | JR Motorsports | Chevrolet |
| 9 | Jake Finch | JR Motorsports | Chevrolet |
| 17 | Corey Day (CC) | Hendrick Motorsports | Chevrolet |
| 18 | William Sawalich | Joe Gibbs Racing | Toyota |
| 19 | Brent Crews (OC) (R) | Joe Gibbs Racing | Toyota |
| 20 | Brandon Jones (CC) | Joe Gibbs Racing | Toyota |
| 21 | Austin Hill (CC) | Richard Childress Racing | Chevrolet |
| 24 | Harrison Burton | Sam Hunt Racing | Toyota |
| 26 | Dean Thompson | Sam Hunt Racing | Toyota |
| 27 | Jeb Burton | Jordan Anderson Racing | Chevrolet |
| 28 | Kyle Sieg | RSS Racing | Chevrolet |
| 31 | Blaine Perkins | Jordan Anderson Racing | Chevrolet |
| 32 | Carson Brown | Jordan Anderson Racing | Chevrolet |
| 38 | J. J. Yeley | RSS Racing | Ford |
| 39 | Ryan Sieg | RSS Racing | Chevrolet |
| 41 | Sam Mayer (CC) | Haas Factory Team | Chevrolet |
| 42 | Matt DiBenedetto | Young's Motorsports | Chevrolet |
| 44 | Brennan Poole | Alpha Prime Racing | Chevrolet |
| 45 | Lavar Scott (R) | Alpha Prime Racing | Ford |
| 47 | Dawson Cram | Mike Harmon Racing | Chevrolet |
| 48 | Patrick Staropoli (R) | Big Machine Racing | Chevrolet |
| 51 | Jeremy Clements | Jeremy Clements Racing | Chevrolet |
| 53 | Derek Lemke (i) | Joey Gase Motorsports | Chevrolet |
| 54 | Taylor Gray (CC) | Joe Gibbs Racing | Toyota |
| 55 | Joey Gase | Joey Gase Motorsports | Ford |
| 87 | Austin Green | Peterson Racing | Chevrolet |
| 88 | Rajah Caruth (CC) | JR Motorsports | Chevrolet |
| 91 | Myatt Snider | DGM Racing | Chevrolet |
| 92 | Mason Maggio | DGM Racing | Chevrolet |
| 96 | Anthony Alfredo | Viking Motorsports | Chevrolet |
| 99 | Parker Retzlaff (CC) | Viking Motorsports | Chevrolet |
Official entry list

== Starting lineup ==
Practice and qualifying were originally scheduled to be held on Saturday, October 10, at 8:30 AM and 9:35 AM EST, but were both cancelled due to inclement weather. Carson Kvapil, driving for JR Motorsports, was awarded the pole position as a result of NASCAR's pandemic formula with a score of 2.000.

=== Starting lineup ===
| Pos. | # | Driver | Team | Make |
|---|---|---|---|---|
| 1 | 1 | Carson Kvapil (CC) | JR Motorsports | Chevrolet |
| 2 | 17 | Corey Day (CC) | Hendrick Motorsports | Chevrolet |
| 3 | 2 | Jesse Love (CC) | Richard Childress Racing | Chevrolet |
| 4 | 19 | Brent Crews (OC) (R) | Joe Gibbs Racing | Toyota |
| 5 | 41 | Sam Mayer (CC) | Haas Factory Team | Chevrolet |
| 6 | 54 | Taylor Gray (CC) | Joe Gibbs Racing | Toyota |
| 7 | 21 | Austin Hill (CC) | Richard Childress Racing | Chevrolet |
| 8 | 00 | Sheldon Creed (CC) | Haas Factory Team | Chevrolet |
| 9 | 18 | William Sawalich | Joe Gibbs Racing | Toyota |
| 10 | 88 | Rajah Caruth (CC) | JR Motorsports | Chevrolet |
| 11 | 51 | Jeremy Clements | Jeremy Clements Racing | Chevrolet |
| 12 | 96 | Anthony Alfredo | Viking Motorsports | Chevrolet |
| 13 | 8 | Sammy Smith (CC) | JR Motorsports | Chevrolet |
| 14 | 39 | Ryan Sieg | RSS Racing | Chevrolet |
| 15 | 24 | Harrison Burton | Sam Hunt Racing | Toyota |
| 16 | 99 | Parker Retzlaff (CC) | Viking Motorsports | Chevrolet |
| 17 | 26 | Dean Thompson | Sam Hunt Racing | Toyota |
| 18 | 44 | Brennan Poole | Alpha Prime Racing | Chevrolet |
| 19 | 87 | Austin Green | Peterson Racing | Chevrolet |
| 20 | 32 | Carson Brown | Jordan Anderson Racing | Chevrolet |
| 21 | 27 | Jeb Burton | Jordan Anderson Racing | Chevrolet |
| 22 | 28 | Kyle Sieg | RSS Racing | Chevrolet |
| 23 | 7 | Justin Allgaier (CC) | JR Motorsports | Chevrolet |
| 24 | 0 | Garrett Smithley | SS-Green Light Racing | Chevrolet |
| 25 | 48 | Patrick Staropoli (R) | Big Machine Racing | Chevrolet |
| 26 | 42 | Matt DiBenedetto | Young's Motorsports | Chevrolet |
| 27 | 45 | Lavar Scott (R) | Alpha Prime Racing | Ford |
| 28 | 20 | Brandon Jones (CC) | Joe Gibbs Racing | Toyota |
| 29 | 92 | Mason Maggio | DGM Racing | Chevrolet |
| 30 | 31 | Blaine Perkins | Jordan Anderson Racing | Chevrolet |
| 31 | 55 | Joey Gase | Joey Gase Motorsports | Ford |
| 32 | 07 | Josh Bilicki | SS-Green Light Racing | Chevrolet |
Qualified by owner's points
| 33 | 02 | Ryan Ellis | Young's Motorsports | Chevrolet |
| 34 | 91 | Myatt Snider | DGM Racing | Chevrolet |
| 35 | 53 | Derek Lemke (i) | Joey Gase Motorsports | Chevrolet |
| 36 | 9 | Jake Finch | JR Motorsports | Chevrolet |
| 37 | 47 | Dawson Cram | Mike Harmon Racing | Chevrolet |
| 38 | 38 | J. J. Yeley | RSS Racing | Ford |
Official starting lineup

== Race ==
=== Race results ===
==== Stage Results ====
Stage One Laps: 45

| Pos. | # | Driver | Team | Make | Pts |
|---|---|---|---|---|---|
| 1 | 17 | Corey Day (CC) | Hendrick Motorsports | Chevrolet | 10 |
| 2 | 2 | Jesse Love (CC) | Richard Childress Racing | Chevrolet | 9 |
| 3 | 41 | Sam Mayer (CC) | Haas Factory Team | Chevrolet | 8 |
| 4 | 7 | Justin Allgaier (CC) | JR Motorsports | Chevrolet | 7 |
| 5 | 1 | Carson Kvapil (CC) | JR Motorsports | Chevrolet | 6 |
| 6 | 21 | Austin Hill (CC) | Richard Childress Racing | Chevrolet | 5 |
| 7 | 19 | Brent Crews (OC) (R) | Joe Gibbs Racing | Toyota | 4 |
| 8 | 51 | Jeremy Clements | Jeremy Clements Racing | Chevrolet | 3 |
| 9 | 54 | Taylor Gray (CC) | Joe Gibbs Racing | Toyota | 2 |
| 10 | 99 | Parker Retzlaff (CC) | Viking Motorsports | Chevrolet | 1 |

Stage Two Laps: 45

| Pos. | # | Driver | Team | Make | Pts |
|---|---|---|---|---|---|
| 1 | 7 | Justin Allgaier (CC) | JR Motorsports | Chevrolet | 10 |
| 2 | 2 | Jesse Love (CC) | Richard Childress Racing | Chevrolet | 9 |
| 3 | 54 | Taylor Gray (CC) | Joe Gibbs Racing | Toyota | 8 |
| 4 | 41 | Sam Mayer (CC) | Haas Factory Team | Chevrolet | 7 |
| 5 | 19 | Brent Crews (OC) (R) | Joe Gibbs Racing | Toyota | 6 |
| 6 | 21 | Austin Hill (CC) | Richard Childress Racing | Chevrolet | 5 |
| 7 | 17 | Corey Day (CC) | Hendrick Motorsports | Chevrolet | 4 |
| 8 | 1 | Carson Kvapil (CC) | JR Motorsports | Chevrolet | 3 |
| 9 | 8 | Sammy Smith (CC) | JR Motorsports | Chevrolet | 2 |
| 10 | 00 | Sheldon Creed (CC) | Haas Factory Team | Chevrolet | 1 |

=== Final Stage Results ===
Stage Three Laps: 110

| Fin | St | # | Driver | Team | Make | Laps | Led | Status | Pts |
|---|---|---|---|---|---|---|---|---|---|
| 1 | 2 | 17 | Corey Day (CC) | Hendrick Motorsports | Chevrolet | 200 | 55 | Running | 69 |
| 2 | 3 | 2 | Jesse Love (CC) | Richard Childress Racing | Chevrolet | 200 | 80 | Running | 54 |
| 3 | 8 | 00 | Sheldon Creed (CC) | Haas Factory Team | Chevrolet | 200 | 0 | Running | 35 |
| 4 | 23 | 7 | Justin Allgaier (CC) | JR Motorsports | Chevrolet | 200 | 54 | Running | 50 |
| 5 | 20 | 32 | Carson Brown | Jordan Anderson Racing | Chevrolet | 200 | 0 | Running | 32 |
| 6 | 28 | 20 | Brandon Jones (CC) | Joe Gibbs Racing | Toyota | 200 | 0 | Running | 31 |
| 7 | 7 | 21 | Austin Hill (CC) | Richard Childress Racing | Chevrolet | 200 | 0 | Running | 40 |
| 8 | 12 | 96 | Anthony Alfredo | Viking Motorsports | Chevrolet | 200 | 0 | Running | 29 |
| 9 | 6 | 54 | Taylor Gray (CC) | Joe Gibbs Racing | Toyota | 200 | 2 | Running | 38 |
| 10 | 18 | 44 | Brennan Poole | Alpha Prime Racing | Chevrolet | 200 | 0 | Running | 27 |
| 11 | 9 | 18 | William Sawalich | Joe Gibbs Racing | Toyota | 200 | 0 | Running | 26 |
| 12 | 16 | 99 | Parker Retzlaff (CC) | Viking Motorsports | Chevrolet | 200 | 0 | Running | 26 |
| 13 | 15 | 24 | Harrison Burton | Sam Hunt Racing | Toyota | 200 | 0 | Running | 24 |
| 14 | 17 | 26 | Dean Thompson | Sam Hunt Racing | Toyota | 200 | 0 | Running | 23 |
| 15 | 31 | 55 | Joey Gase | Joey Gase Motorsports | Ford | 200 | 0 | Running | 22 |
| 16 | 13 | 8 | Sammy Smith (CC) | JR Motorsports | Chevrolet | 200 | 0 | Running | 23 |
| 17 | 14 | 39 | Ryan Sieg | RSS Racing | Chevrolet | 200 | 0 | Running | 20 |
| 18 | 32 | 07 | Josh Bilicki | SS-Green Light Racing | Chevrolet | 200 | 0 | Running | 19 |
| 19 | 30 | 31 | Blaine Perkins | Jordan Anderson Racing | Chevrolet | 200 | 0 | Running | 18 |
| 20 | 11 | 51 | Jeremy Clements | Jeremy Clements Racing | Chevrolet | 200 | 0 | Running | 20 |
| 21 | 26 | 42 | Matt DiBenedetto | Young's Motorsports | Chevrolet | 200 | 0 | Running | 16 |
| 22 | 21 | 27 | Jeb Burton | Jordan Anderson Racing | Chevrolet | 200 | 0 | Running | 15 |
| 23 | 19 | 87 | Austin Green | Peterson Racing | Chevrolet | 199 | 0 | Running | 14 |
| 24 | 5 | 41 | Sam Mayer (CC) | Haas Factory Team | Chevrolet | 199 | 0 | Running | 28 |
| 25 | 34 | 91 | Myatt Snider | DGM Racing | Chevrolet | 198 | 0 | Running | 12 |
| 26 | 29 | 92 | Mason Maggio | DGM Racing | Chevrolet | 197 | 0 | Running | 11 |
| 27 | 27 | 45 | Lavar Scott (R) | Alpha Prime Racing | Ford | 196 | 0 | Running | 10 |
| 28 | 35 | 53 | Derek Lemke (i) | Joey Gase Motorsports | Chevrolet | 196 | 0 | Running | 0 |
| 29 | 24 | 0 | Garrett Smithley | SS-Green Light Racing | Chevrolet | 196 | 0 | Running | 8 |
| 30 | 4 | 19 | Brent Crews (OC) (R) | Joe Gibbs Racing | Toyota | 184 | 4 | Accident | 17 |
| 31 | 36 | 9 | Jake Finch | JR Motorsports | Chevrolet | 174 | 0 | Suspension | 6 |
| 32 | 1 | 1 | Carson Kvapil (CC) | JR Motorsports | Chevrolet | 171 | 3 | Running | 14 |
| 33 | 25 | 48 | Patrick Staropoli (R) | Big Machine Racing | Chevrolet | 166 | 0 | Suspension | 4 |
| 34 | 33 | 02 | Ryan Ellis | Young's Motorsports | Chevrolet | 163 | 0 | Accident | 3 |
| 35 | 22 | 28 | Kyle Sieg | RSS Racing | Chevrolet | 145 | 0 | Engine | 2 |
| 36 | 10 | 88 | Rajah Caruth (CC) | JR Motorsports | Chevrolet | 126 | 0 | Accident | 1 |
| 37 | 37 | 47 | Dawson Cram | Mike Harmon Racing | Chevrolet | 66 | 0 | Brakes | 1 |
| 38 | 38 | 38 | J. J. Yeley | RSS Racing | Ford | 63 | 2 | Water Pump | 1 |
Official race results

=== Race statistics ===
- Lead changes: 16 among 7 different drivers
- Cautions/Laps: 7 for 38 laps
- Red flags: 0
- Time of race: 2 hours, 28 minutes and 11 seconds
- Average speed: 121.471 miles per hour (195.489 km/h)

== Standings after the race ==
Drivers' Championship standings

| | Pos | Driver | Points |
|---|---|---|---|
| | 1 | Sheldon Creed | 2,294 |
| 1 | 2 | Jesse Love | 2,292 (–2) |
| 2 | 3 | Corey Day | 2,287 (–7) |
| | 4 | Justin Allgaier | 2,279 (–15) |
| 3 | 5 | Carson Kvapil | 2,254 (–40) |
| | 6 | Sam Mayer | 2,235 (–59) |
| | 7 | Taylor Gray | 2,207 (–87) |
| 1 | 8 | Austin Hill | 2,200 (–94) |
| 1 | 9 | Sammy Smith | 2,188 (–106) |
| | 10 | Parker Retzlaff | 2,168 (–126) |
| | 11 | Brandon Jones | 2,153 (–141) |
| | 12 | Rajah Caruth | 2,114 (–180) |
Official driver's standings

Manufacturers' Championship standings

| Pos | Manufacturer | Points |
|---|---|---|
| 1 | Chevrolet | 1,534 |
| 2 | Toyota | 995 (–539) |
| 3 | Ford | 277 (–1,257) |

- Note: Only the first 12 positions are included for the driver standings.

| Previous race: 2026 Focused Health 302 | NASCAR O'Reilly Auto Parts Series; 2026 season | Next race: 2026 Timberland PRO 200 |
