= 2026 Hy-Vee PERKS 250 =

NASCAR O'Reilly Auto Parts Series race at Iowa Speedway

Race details
- Race 23 of 33 in the 2026 NASCAR O'Reilly Auto Parts Series
- Date: August 8, 2026
- Location: Iowa Speedway in Newton, Iowa
- Course: Permanent racing facility
- Course length: 0.875 miles (1.408 km)
- Distance: 260 laps, 227.5 mi (366.12 km)
- Scheduled distance: 250 laps, 218.72 mi (352.044 km)
- Average speed: 83.418 miles per hour (134.248 km/h)

Pole position
Driver	Ryan Sieg	RSS Racing
- Time: 23.966

Most laps led
Driver	Justin Allgaier	JR Motorsports
- Laps: 83

Fastest lap
Driver	Ross Chastain	JR Motorsports
- Time: 24.610

Winner
No. 1	Carson Kvapil	JR Motorsports

Television in the United States
- Network: The CW
- Announcers: Dillon Welch, Jamie McMurray, and Parker Kligerman
- Nielsen ratings: 1,017 million

Radio in the United States
- Radio: MRN
- Booth announcers: Alex Hayden and Mike Bagley
- Turn announcers: Kurt Becker (Turns 2 & 3)

The 2026 Hy-Vee PERKS 250 was a NASCAR O'Reilly Auto Parts Series race that was held on Saturday, August 8, 2026, at Iowa Speedway in Newton, Iowa. The race was contested over 250 laps on the 0.875-mile (1.408 km) oval, it was the 23rd race of the 2026 NASCAR O'Reilly Auto Parts Series season, and the 12th running of the event.

Carson Kvapil, driving for JR Motorsports, took advantage of the final restart, leading the final nine laps to earn his second career NASCAR O'Reilly Auto Parts Series win, and it was his second consecutive win. Pole-sitter Ryan Sieg won the first stage, leading 65 laps, while Justin Allgaier won the second stage, leading a race-high 83 laps. At race's end, Rajah Caruth finished second, and William Sawalich finished third. Ross Chastain and Sheldon Creed rounded out the top five, while Nick Sanchez, Taylor Gray, Dean Thompson, Harrison Burton, and Brennan Poole rounded out the top ten.

== Report ==
=== Background ===
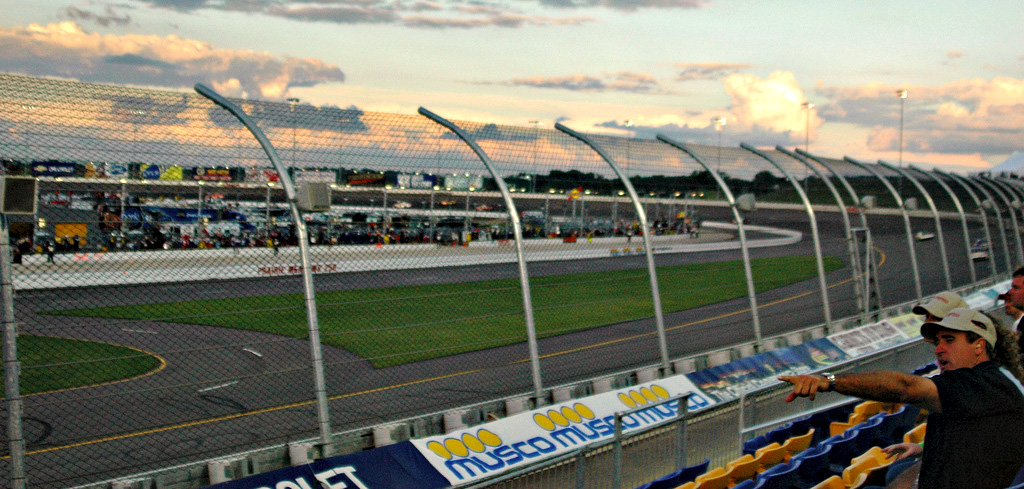
Iowa Speedway, the track where the race was held.

Iowa Speedway is a 7/8-mile (1.4 km) paved oval motor racing track in Newton, Iowa, United States, approximately 30 miles (48 km) east of Des Moines. The track was designed with influence from Rusty Wallace and patterned after Richmond Raceway, a short track where Wallace was very successful. It has over 25,000 permanent seats as well as a unique multi-tiered Recreational Vehicle viewing area along the backstretch. The track hosts the NTT IndyCar Series and NASCAR events.

After the 2020 race was canceled due to the pandemic, the race was removed from the 2021 schedule. In 2024, it was announced that the Xfinity Series would return to Iowa with a Cup Series race.

==== Entry list ====
- (R) denotes rookie driver.
- (i) denotes driver who is ineligible for series driver points.

#	Driver	Team	Make
00	Sheldon Creed	Haas Factory Team	Chevrolet
0	Garrett Smithley	SS-Green Light Racing	Chevrolet
1	Carson Kvapil	JR Motorsports	Chevrolet
02	Ryan Ellis	Young's Motorsports	Chevrolet
2	Jesse Love	Richard Childress Racing	Chevrolet
7	Justin Allgaier	JR Motorsports	Chevrolet
8	Sammy Smith	JR Motorsports	Chevrolet
9	Ross Chastain (i)	JR Motorsports	Chevrolet
17	Corey Day	Hendrick Motorsports	Chevrolet
18	William Sawalich	Joe Gibbs Racing	Toyota
19	Brent Crews (R)	Joe Gibbs Racing	Toyota
20	Brandon Jones	Joe Gibbs Racing	Toyota
21	Austin Hill	Richard Childress Racing	Chevrolet
24	Harrison Burton	Sam Hunt Racing	Toyota
26	Dean Thompson	Sam Hunt Racing	Toyota
27	Jeb Burton	Jordan Anderson Racing	Chevrolet
28	Kyle Sieg	RSS Racing	Chevrolet
31	Blaine Perkins	Jordan Anderson Racing	Chevrolet
32	Carson Brown	Jordan Anderson Racing	Chevrolet
39	Ryan Sieg	RSS Racing	Chevrolet
41	Sam Mayer	Haas Factory Team	Chevrolet
42	Nathan Byrd	Young's Motorsports	Chevrolet
44	Brennan Poole	Alpha Prime Racing	Chevrolet
45	Lavar Scott (R)	Alpha Prime Racing	Chevrolet
48	Patrick Staropoli (R)	Big Machine Racing	Chevrolet
47	Carson Ware	Mike Harmon Racing	Chevrolet
51	Jeremy Clements	Jeremy Clements Racing	Chevrolet
53	Tyler Tomassi	Joey Gase Motorsports	Toyota
54	Taylor Gray	Joe Gibbs Racing	Toyota
55	Joey Gase	Joey Gase Motorsports	Ford
87	Nick Sanchez	Peterson Racing	Chevrolet
88	Rajah Caruth	JR Motorsports	Chevrolet
91	Derek Lemke (i)	DGM Racing	Chevrolet
92	Mason Maggio	DGM Racing	Chevrolet
96	Anthony Alfredo	Viking Motorsports	Chevrolet
99	Parker Retzlaff	Viking Motorsports	Chevrolet
Official entry list

== Practice ==
The first and only practice session was held on Saturday, August 8, at 10:30 AM CST, and lasted for 50 minutes.

Jesse Love, driving for Richard Childress Racing, set the fastest time in the session, with a lap of 24.118 seconds, and a speed of 130.608 miles per hour (210.193 km/h).

Pos.	#	Driver	Team	Make	Time	Speed
1	2	Jesse Love	Richard Childress Racing	Chevrolet	24.118	130.608
2	99	Parker Retzlaff	Viking Motorsports	Chevrolet	24.166	130.348
3	39	Ryan Sieg	RSS Racing	Chevrolet	24.189	130.224
Full practice results

== Qualifying ==
Qualifying was held on Saturday, August 8, at 11:35 AM CST. Since Iowa Speedway is a short track, the qualifying procedure used was a single-car, two-lap system with one round. Drivers were on track by themselves and had two laps to post a qualifying time, and whoever set the fastest time won the pole.

Ryan Sieg, driving for RSS Racing, qualified on pole position with a lap of 23.966 seconds, and a speed of 131.436 miles per hour (211.526 km/h).

No drivers failed to qualify.

=== Qualifying results ===
Pos.	#	Driver	Team	Make	Time	Speed
1	39	Ryan Sieg	RSS Racing	Chevrolet	23.966	131.436
2	9	Ross Chastain (i)	JR Motorsports	Chevrolet	24.030	131.086
3	1	Carson Kvapil	JR Motorsports	Chevrolet	24.042	131.021
4	88	Rajah Caruth	JR Motorsports	Chevrolet	24.049	130.983
5	7	Justin Allgaier	JR Motorsports	Chevrolet	24.054	130.955
6	00	Sheldon Creed	Haas Factory Team	Chevrolet	24.055	130.950
7	51	Jeremy Clements	Jeremy Clements Racing	Chevrolet	24.102	130.695
8	17	Corey Day	Hendrick Motorsports	Chevrolet	24.144	130.467
9	8	Sammy Smith	JR Motorsports	Chevrolet	24.144	130.467
10	99	Parker Retzlaff	Viking Motorsports	Chevrolet	24.144	130.467
11	2	Jesse Love	Richard Childress Racing	Chevrolet	24.147	130.451
12	27	Jeb Burton	Jordan Anderson Racing	Chevrolet	24.195	130.192
13	54	Taylor Gray	Joe Gibbs Racing	Toyota	24.198	130.176
14	87	Nick Sanchez	Peterson Racing	Chevrolet	24.207	130.128
15	20	Brandon Jones	Joe Gibbs Racing	Toyota	24.242	129.940
16	24	Harrison Burton	Sam Hunt Racing	Toyota	24.266	129.811
17	18	William Sawalich	Joe Gibbs Racing	Toyota	24.274	129.768
18	19	Brent Crews (R)	Joe Gibbs Racing	Toyota	24.297	129.646
19	96	Anthony Alfredo	Viking Motorsports	Chevrolet	24.307	129.592
20	32	Carson Brown	Jordan Anderson Racing	Chevrolet	24.309	129.582
21	28	Kyle Sieg	RSS Racing	Chevrolet	24.309	129.582
22	48	Patrick Staropoli (R)	Big Machine Racing	Chevrolet	24.329	129.475
23	41	Sam Mayer	Haas Factory Team	Chevrolet	24.330	129.470
24	45	Lavar Scott (R)	Alpha Prime Racing	Chevrolet	24.420	128.993
25	31	Blaine Perkins	Jordan Anderson Racing	Chevrolet	24.451	128.829
26	44	Brennan Poole	Alpha Prime Racing	Chevrolet	24.452	128.824
27	26	Dean Thompson	Sam Hunt Racing	Toyota	24.458	128.792
28	21	Austin Hill	Richard Childress Racing	Chevrolet	24.500	128.571
29	92	Mason Maggio	DGM Racing	Chevrolet	24.543	128.346
30	91	Derek Lemke (i)	DGM Racing	Chevrolet	24.559	128.263
31	42	Nathan Byrd	Young's Motorsports	Chevrolet	24.710	127.479
32	02	Ryan Ellis	Young's Motorsports	Chevrolet	24.724	127.407
Qualified by owner's points
33	0	Garrett Smithley	SS-Green Light Racing	Chevrolet	24.806	126.985
34	55	Joey Gase	Joey Gase Motorsports	Ford	24.848	126.771
35	07	Josh Bilicki	SS-Green Light Racing	Chevrolet	24.861	126.704
36	53	Tyler Tomassi	Joey Gase Motorsports	Toyota	24.996	126.020
37	47	Carson Ware	Mike Harmon Racing	Chevrolet	25.103	125.483
Official qualifying results
Official starting lineup

== Race ==
=== Race results ===
==== Stage Results ====
Stage One Laps: 60

Pos.	#	Driver	Team	Make	Pts
1	39	Ryan Sieg	RSS Racing	Chevrolet	10
2	7	Justin Allgaier	JR Motorsports	Chevrolet	9
3	00	Sheldon Creed	Haas Factory Team	Chevrolet	8
4	9	Ross Chastain (i)	JR Motorsports	Chevrolet	0
5	8	Sammy Smith	JR Motorsports	Chevrolet	6
6	41	Sam Mayer	Haas Factory Team	Chevrolet	5
7	1	Carson Kvapil	JR Motorsports	Chevrolet	4
8	20	Brandon Jones	Joe Gibbs Racing	Toyota	3
9	17	Corey Day	Hendrick Motorsports	Chevrolet	2
10	18	William Sawalich	Joe Gibbs Racing	Toyota	1

Stage Two Laps: 60

Pos.	#	Driver	Team	Make	Pts
1	7	Justin Allgaier	JR Motorsports	Chevrolet	10
2	00	Sheldon Creed	Haas Factory Team	Chevrolet	9
3	8	Sammy Smith	JR Motorsports	Chevrolet	8
4	39	Ryan Sieg	RSS Racing	Chevrolet	7
5	41	Sam Mayer	Haas Factory Team	Chevrolet	6
6	17	Corey Day	Hendrick Motorsports	Chevrolet	5
7	19	Brent Crews (R)	Joe Gibbs Racing	Toyota	4
8	18	William Sawalich	Joe Gibbs Racing	Toyota	3
9	21	Austin Hill	Richard Childress Racing	Chevrolet	2
10	88	Rajah Caruth	JR Motorsports	Chevrolet	1

=== Final Stage results ===
Stage Three Laps: 140

Fin	St	#	Driver	Team	Make	Laps	Led	Status	Pts
1	3	1	Carson Kvapil	JR Motorsports	Chevrolet	260	9	Running	59
2	4	88	Rajah Caruth	JR Motorsports	Chevrolet	260	0	Running	36
3	17	18	William Sawalich	Joe Gibbs Racing	Toyota	260	0	Running	38
4	2	9	Ross Chastain (i)	JR Motorsports	Chevrolet	260	63	Running	0
5	6	00	Sheldon Creed	Haas Factory Team	Chevrolet	260	36	Running	49
6	14	87	Nick Sanchez	Peterson Racing	Chevrolet	260	0	Running	31
7	13	54	Taylor Gray	Joe Gibbs Racing	Toyota	260	0	Running	30
8	27	26	Dean Thompson	Sam Hunt Racing	Toyota	260	0	Running	29
9	16	24	Harrison Burton	Sam Hunt Racing	Toyota	260	0	Running	28
10	26	44	Brennan Poole	Alpha Prime Racing	Chevrolet	260	0	Running	27
11	28	21	Austin Hill	Richard Childress Racing	Chevrolet	260	0	Running	28
12	21	28	Kyle Sieg	RSS Racing	Chevrolet	260	0	Running	25
13	10	99	Parker Retzlaff	Viking Motorsports	Chevrolet	260	0	Running	24
14	15	20	Brandon Jones	Joe Gibbs Racing	Toyota	260	0	Running	26
15	20	32	Carson Brown	Jordan Anderson Racing	Chevrolet	260	0	Running	22
16	18	19	Brent Crews (R)	Joe Gibbs Racing	Toyota	260	0	Running	25
17	9	8	Sammy Smith	JR Motorsports	Chevrolet	260	0	Running	34
18	22	48	Patrick Staropoli (R)	Big Machine Racing	Chevrolet	260	0	Running	19
19	19	96	Anthony Alfredo	Viking Motorsports	Chevrolet	260	0	Running	18
20	25	31	Blaine Perkins	Jordan Anderson Racing	Chevrolet	260	0	Running	17
21	23	41	Sam Mayer	Haas Factory Team	Chevrolet	260	1	Running	27
22	34	55	Joey Gase	Joey Gase Motorsports	Ford	260	0	Running	15
23	32	02	Ryan Ellis	Young's Motorsports	Chevrolet	260	0	Running	14
24	5	7	Justin Allgaier	JR Motorsports	Chevrolet	260	83	Running	32
25	31	42	Nathan Byrd	Young's Motorsports	Chevrolet	260	0	Running	12
26	30	91	Derek Lemke (i)	DGM Racing	Chevrolet	259	0	Running	0
27	12	27	Jeb Burton	Jordan Anderson Racing	Chevrolet	259	3	Running	10
28	24	45	Lavar Scott (R)	Alpha Prime Racing	Chevrolet	259	0	Running	9
29	33	0	Garrett Smithley	SS-Green Light Racing	Chevrolet	258	0	Running	8
30	7	51	Jeremy Clements	Jeremy Clements Racing	Chevrolet	257	0	Running	7
31	35	07	Josh Bilicki	SS-Green Light Racing	Chevrolet	257	0	Running	6
32	36	53	Tyler Tomassi	Joey Gase Motorsports	Toyota	256	0	Running	5
33	1	39	Ryan Sieg	RSS Racing	Chevrolet	252	65	Accident	21
34	29	92	Mason Maggio	DGM Racing	Chevrolet	231	0	Suspension	3
35	11	2	Jesse Love	Richard Childress Racing	Chevrolet	200	0	Running	2
36	8	17	Corey Day	Hendrick Motorsports	Chevrolet	193	0	Accident	8
37	37	47	Carson Ware	Mike Harmon Racing	Chevrolet	164	0	Accident	1
Official race results

=== Race statistics ===
- Lead changes: 7 among 7 different drivers
- Cautions/Laps: 12 for 72 laps
- Red flags: 0
- Time of race: 2 hours, 43 minutes and 38 seconds
- Average speed: 83.418 miles per hour (134.248 km/h)

== Standings after the race ==
Drivers' Championship standings

	Pos	Driver	Points
	1	Justin Allgaier	1,048
	2	Carson Kvapil	810 (–238)
1	3	Sheldon Creed	782 (–266)
1	4	Jesse Love	749 (–299)
	5	Corey Day	727 (–321)
	6	Brandon Jones	718 (–330)
	7	Austin Hill	716 (–332)
	8	Sammy Smith	692 (–356)
	9	Parker Retzlaff	643 (–405)
	10	Sam Mayer	616 (–432)
2	11	William Sawalich	598 (–450)
1	12	Brent Crews	598 (–450)
Official driver's standings

Manufacturers' Championship standings

Pos	Manufacturer	Points
1	Chevrolet	1,204
2	Toyota	797 (–407)
3	Ford	208 (–996)

- Note: Only the first 12 positions are included for the driver standings.

Previous race: 2026 Pennzoil 250	NASCAR O'Reilly Auto Parts Series; 2026 season	Next race: 2026 Winn-Dixie 250
