= 2026 Pit Boss/FoodMaxx 250 =

NASCAR O'Reilly Auto Parts Series race at Sonoma Raceway

Race details
- Race 19 of 33 in the 2026 NASCAR O'Reilly Auto Parts Series
- Date: June 27, 2026
- Location: Sonoma Raceway in Sonoma, California
- Course: Permanent racing facility
- Course length: 1.99 miles (3.20 km)
- Distance: 79 laps, 157.21 mi (253 km)
- Average speed: 76.305 miles per hour (122.801 km/h)

Pole position
Driver	Shane van Gisbergen	JR Motorsports
- Time: 1:15.029

Most laps led
Driver	Shane van Gisbergen	JR Motorsports
- Laps: 66

Fastest lap
Driver	Connor Zilisch	JR Motorsports
- Time: 1:16.564

Winner
No. 9	Shane van Gisbergen	JR Motorsports

Television in the United States
- Network: The CW
- Announcers: Adam Alexander, Parker Kligerman, and A. J. Allmendinger

Radio in the United States
- Radio: PRN
- Booth announcers: Brad Gillie and Nick Yeoman
- Turn announcers: Pat Patterson (2, 3, & 3a), Andrew Kurland (4a & 7a), and Doug Turnbull (10 & 11)

The 2026 Pit Boss/FoodMaxx 250 was a NASCAR O'Reilly Auto Parts Series race held on Saturday, June 27, 2026, at Sonoma Raceway in Sonoma, California. Contested over 79 laps on the 1.99-mile (3.20 km) asphalt road course, it was the 19th race of the 2026 NASCAR O'Reilly Auto Parts Series season, and the fourth running of the event.

Shane van Gisbergen, driving for JR Motorsports, showed off another dominating road course performance, leading a race-high 66 laps from the pole position to earn his sixth career NASCAR O'Reilly Auto Parts Series win, and his second of the season. With his win, Gisbergen also became the winningest international born driver in series history. Connor Zilisch finished second, and Brent Crews finished third. Anthony Alfredo and Parker Retzlaff rounded out the top five, while Carson Kvapil, Corey Day, Sam Mayer, Jesse Love, and Sheldon Creed rounded out the top ten.

== Report ==
=== Background ===
Layout of Sonoma Raceway, the track where the race was held.

Sonoma Raceway is a 1.99-mile (3.20 km) road course and drag strip located on the landform known as Sears Point in the southern Sonoma Mountains in Sonoma, California, U.S. The road course features 12 turns on a hilly course with 160 feet (49 m) of total elevation change. It is host to one of only seven NASCAR Cup Series races each year that are run on road courses. It is also host to the NTT IndyCar Series and several other auto races and motorcycle races such as the American Federation of Motorcyclists series. Sonoma Raceway continues to host amateur, or club racing events which may or may not be open to the general public. The largest such car club is the Sports Car Club of America. In 2022, the race was reverted to racing the club configuration.

==== Entry list ====
- (R) denotes rookie driver.
- (i) denotes driver who is ineligible for series driver points.

#	Driver	Team	Make
00	Sheldon Creed	Haas Factory Team	Chevrolet
0	Alex Labbé	SS-Green Light Racing	Chevrolet
1	Connor Zilisch (i)	JR Motorsports	Chevrolet
02	Ryan Ellis	Young's Motorsports	Chevrolet
2	Jesse Love	Richard Childress Racing	Chevrolet
07	Josh Bilicki	SS-Green Light Racing	Chevrolet
7	Justin Allgaier	JR Motorsports	Chevrolet
8	Sammy Smith	JR Motorsports	Chevrolet
9	Shane van Gisbergen (i)	JR Motorsports	Chevrolet
17	Corey Day	Hendrick Motorsports	Chevrolet
18	William Sawalich	Joe Gibbs Racing	Toyota
19	Brent Crews (R)	Joe Gibbs Racing	Toyota
20	Brandon Jones	Joe Gibbs Racing	Toyota
21	Austin Hill	Richard Childress Racing	Chevrolet
24	Harrison Burton	Sam Hunt Racing	Toyota
26	Dean Thompson	Sam Hunt Racing	Toyota
27	Jeb Burton	Jordan Anderson Racing	Chevrolet
28	Kyle Sieg	RSS Racing	Chevrolet
31	Blaine Perkins	Jordan Anderson Racing	Chevrolet
32	Ross Chastain (i)	Jordan Anderson Racing	Chevrolet
35	Dawson Cram	Joey Gase Motorsports	Chevrolet
39	Ryan Sieg	RSS Racing	Chevrolet
41	Sam Mayer	Haas Factory Team	Chevrolet
42	Will Rodgers	Young's Motorsports	Chevrolet
44	Brennan Poole	Alpha Prime Racing	Chevrolet
45	Lavar Scott (R)	Alpha Prime Racing	Chevrolet
48	Patrick Staropoli (R)	Big Machine Racing	Chevrolet
51	Jeremy Clements	Jeremy Clements Racing	Chevrolet
53	Kyle Kelley	Joey Gase Motorsports	Chevrolet
54	Taylor Gray	Joe Gibbs Racing	Toyota
55	Brad Perez	Joey Gase Motorsports	Toyota
71	Leland Honeyman (i)	DGM Racing	Chevrolet
87	Austin Green	Peterson Racing	Chevrolet
88	Rajah Caruth	JR Motorsports	Chevrolet
91	Carson Kvapil	DGM Racing	Chevrolet
92	Josh Williams	DGM Racing	Chevrolet
96	Anthony Alfredo	Viking Motorsports	Chevrolet
99	Parker Retzlaff	Viking Motorsports	Chevrolet
Official entry list

== Practice ==
The first and only practice session was held on Friday, June 26, at 1:00 PM PST, and lasted for 50 minutes.

Corey Day, driving for Hendrick Motorsports, set the fastest time in the session, with a lap of 1:16.374 seconds, and a speed of 93.802 miles per hour (150.960 km/h).

Pos.	#	Driver	Team	Make	Time	Speed
1	17	Corey Day	Hendrick Motorsports	Chevrolet	1:16.374	93.802
2	9	Shane van Gisbergen (i)	JR Motorsports	Chevrolet	1:16.800	93.281
3	2	Jesse Love	Richard Childress Racing	Chevrolet	1:16.961	93.086
Full practice results

== Qualifying ==
Qualifying was held on Friday, June 26, at 2:05 PM PST. Since Sonoma Raceway is a road course, the qualifying procedure used was a two-group system with one round. Drivers were separated into two groups, A and B. Each driver had multiple laps to set a time. Whoever set the fastest time between both groups won the pole.

Under a 2021 rule change, the timing line in road course qualifying is "not" the start-finish line. Instead, the timing line for qualifying was set at the exit of Turn 10. Shane van Gisbergen, driving for JR Motorsports, qualified on pole position with a lap of 1:15.029 seconds, and a speed of 95.483 miles per hour (153.665 km/h).

No drivers failed to qualify.

=== Qualifying results ===
Pos.	#	Driver	Team	Make	Time	Speed
1	9	Shane van Gisbergen (i)	JR Motorsports	Chevrolet	1:15.029	95.483
2	19	Brent Crews (R)	Joe Gibbs Racing	Toyota	1:15.218	95.243
3	54	Taylor Gray	Joe Gibbs Racing	Toyota	1:15.453	94.947
4	96	Anthony Alfredo	Viking Motorsports	Chevrolet	1:15.518	94.865
5	99	Parker Retzlaff	Viking Motorsports	Chevrolet	1:15.680	94.662
6	17	Corey Day	Hendrick Motorsports	Chevrolet	1:15.705	94.630
7	2	Jesse Love	Richard Childress Racing	Chevrolet	1:15.754	94.569
8	7	Justin Allgaier	JR Motorsports	Chevrolet	1:15.759	94.563
9	41	Sam Mayer	Haas Factory Team	Chevrolet	1:15.797	94.516
10	21	Austin Hill	Richard Childress Racing	Chevrolet	1:15.875	94.418
11	00	Sheldon Creed	Haas Factory Team	Chevrolet	1:15.950	94.325
12	18	William Sawalich	Joe Gibbs Racing	Toyota	1:16.021	94.237
13	8	Sammy Smith	JR Motorsports	Chevrolet	1:16.169	94.054
14	20	Brandon Jones	Joe Gibbs Racing	Toyota	1:16.216	93.996
15	32	Ross Chastain (i)	Jordan Anderson Racing	Chevrolet	1:16.319	93.869
16	91	Carson Kvapil	DGM Racing	Chevrolet	1:16.332	93.853
17	26	Dean Thompson	Sam Hunt Racing	Toyota	1:16.509	93.636
18	07	Josh Bilicki	SS-Green Light Racing	Chevrolet	1:16.578	93.552
19	24	Harrison Burton	Sam Hunt Racing	Toyota	1:16.620	93.500
20	42	Will Rodgers	Young's Motorsports	Chevrolet	1:16.679	93.428
21	88	Rajah Caruth	JR Motorsports	Chevrolet	1:16.702	93.400
22	27	Jeb Burton	Jordan Anderson Racing	Chevrolet	1:16.766	93.323
23	51	Jeremy Clements	Jeremy Clements Racing	Chevrolet	1:16.851	93.219
24	0	Alex Labbé	SS-Green Light Racing	Chevrolet	1:16.898	93.162
25	39	Ryan Sieg	RSS Racing	Chevrolet	1:17.044	92.986
26	92	Josh Williams	DGM Racing	Chevrolet	1:17.126	92.887
27	31	Blaine Perkins	Jordan Anderson Racing	Chevrolet	1:17.167	92.838
28	28	Kyle Sieg	RSS Racing	Chevrolet	1:17.368	92.596
29	02	Ryan Ellis	Young's Motorsports	Chevrolet	1:17.372	92.592
30	1	Connor Zilisch (i)	JR Motorsports	Chevrolet	1:17.395	92.564
31	45	Lavar Scott (R)	Alpha Prime Racing	Chevrolet	1:17.449	92.500
32	44	Brennan Poole	Alpha Prime Racing	Chevrolet	1:17.732	92.163
Qualified by owner's points
33	71	Leland Honeyman (i)	DGM Racing	Chevrolet	1:17.850	92.023
34	48	Patrick Staropoli (R)	Big Machine Racing	Chevrolet	1:17.955	91.899
35	53	Kyle Kelley	Joey Gase Motorsports	Chevrolet	1:18.511	91.248
36	35	Dawson Cram	Joey Gase Motorsports	Chevrolet	1:19.233	90.417
37	87	Austin Green	Peterson Racing	Chevrolet	—	—
38	55	Brad Perez	Joey Gase Motorsports	Toyota	—	—
Official qualifying results
Official starting lineup

== Race ==
=== Race results ===
==== Stage Results ====
Stage One Laps: 20

Pos.	#	Driver	Team	Make	Pts
1	96	Anthony Alfredo	Viking Motorsports	Chevrolet	10
2	19	Brent Crews (R)	Joe Gibbs Racing	Toyota	9
3	54	Taylor Gray	Joe Gibbs Racing	Toyota	8
4	99	Parker Retzlaff	Viking Motorsports	Chevrolet	7
5	17	Corey Day	Hendrick Motorsports	Chevrolet	6
6	21	Austin Hill	Richard Childress Racing	Chevrolet	5
7	32	Ross Chastain (i)	Jordan Anderson Racing	Chevrolet	0
8	42	Will Rodgers	Young's Motorsports	Chevrolet	3
9	07	Josh Bilicki	SS-Green Light Racing	Chevrolet	2
10	0	Alex Labbé	SS-Green Light Racing	Chevrolet	1

Stage Two Laps: 25

Pos.	#	Driver	Team	Make	Pts
1	1	Connor Zilisch (i)	JR Motorsports	Chevrolet	0
2	8	Sammy Smith	JR Motorsports	Chevrolet	9
3	00	Sheldon Creed	Haas Factory Team	Chevrolet	8
4	19	Brent Crews (R)	Joe Gibbs Racing	Toyota	7
5	91	Carson Kvapil	DGM Racing	Chevrolet	6
6	41	Sam Mayer	Haas Factory Team	Chevrolet	5
7	88	Rajah Caruth	JR Motorsports	Chevrolet	4
8	39	Ryan Sieg	RSS Racing	Chevrolet	3
9	0	Alex Labbé	SS-Green Light Racing	Chevrolet	2
10	42	Will Rodgers	Young's Motorsports	Chevrolet	1

=== Final Stage Results ===
Stage Three Laps: 34

Fin	St	#	Driver	Team	Make	Laps	Led	Status	Pts
1	1	9	Shane van Gisbergen (i)	JR Motorsports	Chevrolet	79	66	Running	0
2	30	1	Connor Zilisch (i)	JR Motorsports	Chevrolet	79	4	Running	0
3	2	19	Brent Crews (R)	Joe Gibbs Racing	Toyota	79	1	Running	50
4	4	96	Anthony Alfredo	Viking Motorsports	Chevrolet	79	5	Running	43
5	5	99	Parker Retzlaff	Viking Motorsports	Chevrolet	79	0	Running	39
6	16	91	Carson Kvapil	DGM Racing	Chevrolet	79	0	Running	37
7	6	17	Corey Day	Hendrick Motorsports	Chevrolet	79	0	Running	36
8	9	41	Sam Mayer	Haas Factory Team	Chevrolet	79	0	Running	34
9	7	2	Jesse Love	Richard Childress Racing	Chevrolet	79	1	Running	28
10	11	00	Sheldon Creed	Haas Factory Team	Chevrolet	79	0	Running	35
11	13	8	Sammy Smith	JR Motorsports	Chevrolet	79	0	Running	35
12	37	87	Austin Green	Peterson Racing	Chevrolet	79	0	Running	25
13	12	18	William Sawalich	Joe Gibbs Racing	Toyota	79	0	Running	24
14	21	88	Rajah Caruth	JR Motorsports	Chevrolet	79	0	Running	27
15	25	39	Ryan Sieg	RSS Racing	Chevrolet	79	0	Running	25
16	18	07	Josh Bilicki	SS-Green Light Racing	Chevrolet	79	0	Running	23
17	20	42	Will Rodgers	Young's Motorsports	Chevrolet	79	0	Running	24
18	19	24	Harrison Burton	Sam Hunt Racing	Toyota	79	2	Running	19
19	24	0	Alex Labbé	SS-Green Light Racing	Chevrolet	79	0	Running	21
20	23	51	Jeremy Clements	Jeremy Clements Racing	Chevrolet	79	0	Running	17
21	22	27	Jeb Burton	Jordan Anderson Racing	Chevrolet	79	0	Running	16
22	10	21	Austin Hill	Richard Childress Racing	Chevrolet	79	0	Running	20
23	29	02	Ryan Ellis	Young's Motorsports	Chevrolet	79	0	Running	14
24	32	44	Brennan Poole	Alpha Prime Racing	Chevrolet	79	0	Running	13
25	34	48	Patrick Staropoli (R)	Big Machine Racing	Chevrolet	79	0	Running	12
26	8	7	Justin Allgaier	JR Motorsports	Chevrolet	79	0	Running	11
27	26	92	Josh Williams	DGM Racing	Chevrolet	79	0	Running	10
28	17	26	Dean Thompson	Sam Hunt Racing	Toyota	79	0	Running	9
29	3	54	Taylor Gray	Joe Gibbs Racing	Toyota	78	0	Running	16
30	27	31	Blaine Perkins	Jordan Anderson Racing	Chevrolet	78	0	Running	7
31	28	28	Kyle Sieg	RSS Racing	Chevrolet	78	0	Running	6
32	31	45	Lavar Scott (R)	Alpha Prime Racing	Chevrolet	78	0	Running	5
33	36	35	Dawson Cram	Joey Gase Motorsports	Chevrolet	78	0	Running	4
34	35	53	Kyle Kelley	Joey Gase Motorsports	Chevrolet	77	0	Running	3
35	33	71	Leland Honeyman (i)	DGM Racing	Chevrolet	71	0	Battery	0
36	14	20	Brandon Jones	Joe Gibbs Racing	Toyota	68	0	Running	1
37	15	32	Ross Chastain (i)	Jordan Anderson Racing	Chevrolet	29	0	Rear End	0
38	38	55	Brad Perez	Joey Gase Motorsports	Toyota	0	0	Fuel Pump	1
Official race results

=== Race statistics ===
- Lead changes: 8 among 6 different drivers
- Cautions/Laps: 4 for 11 laps
- Red flags: 0
- Time of race: 2 hours, 3 minutes and 37 seconds
- Average speed: 76.305 miles per hour (122.801 km/h)

== Standings after the race ==
Drivers' Championship standings

	Pos	Driver	Points
	1	Justin Allgaier	858
	2	Jesse Love	651 (–207)
	3	Corey Day	645 (–213)
	4	Sheldon Creed	642 (–216)
	5	Austin Hill	611 (–247)
1	6	Carson Kvapil	604 (–254)
1	7	Sammy Smith	578 (–280)
2	8	Brandon Jones	573 (–285)
	9	Parker Retzlaff	533 (–325)
1	10	Sam Mayer	510 (–348)
2	11	Brent Crews	493 (–365)
2	12	Taylor Gray	492 (–366)
Official driver's standings

Manufacturers' Championship standings

Pos	Manufacturer	Points
1	Chevrolet	1,004
2	Toyota	643 (–361)
3	Ford	189 (–815)

- Note: Only the first 12 positions are included for the driver standings.

Previous race: 2026 United Rentals Driven to Serve 250	NASCAR O'Reilly Auto Parts Series; 2026 season	Next race: 2026 Cuervo 300
