= 2026 Focused Health 302 =

NASCAR O'Reilly Auto Parts Series race at Las Vegas Motor Speedway

Race details
- Race 28 of 33 in the 2026 NASCAR O'Reilly Auto Parts Series
- Date: October 3, 2026
- Location: Las Vegas Motor Speedway in Las Vegas, Nevada
- Course: Permanent racing facility
- Course length: 1.5 miles (2.4 km)
- Distance: 201 laps, 301.5 mi (485.217 km)
- Average speed: 135.370 miles per hour (217.857 km/h)

Pole position
Driver	Corey Day	Hendrick Motorsports
- Time: 29.858

Most laps led
Driver	Corey Day	Hendrick Motorsports
- Laps: 136

Fastest lap
Driver	Corey Day	Hendrick Motorsports
- Time: 30.412

Winner
No. 17	Corey Day	Hendrick Motorsports

Television in the United States
- Network: The CW
- Announcers: Adam Alexander, Jamie McMurray, and Parker Kligerman

Radio in the United States
- Radio: PRN
- Booth announcers: Brad Gillie and Nick Yeoman
- Turn announcers: Andrew Kurland (1 & 2) and Pat Patterson (3 & 4)

The 2026 Focused Health 302 was a NASCAR O'Reilly Auto Parts Series race held on Saturday, October 3, 2026, at Las Vegas Motor Speedway in Las Vegas, Nevada. Contested over 201 laps on the 1.5-mile (2.4 km) asphalt oval, it was the 28th race of the 2026 NASCAR O'Reilly Auto Parts Series season, the fourth race in the NASCAR Chase, and the ninth running of the event.

In a thrilling finish, Corey Day, driving for Hendrick Motorsports, made a bold outside pass on Carson Kvapil in the final lap, hitting the wall three times but still managing to take the lead to earn his third career NASCAR O'Reilly Auto Parts Series win, and his third of the season. Day won the first stage, leading a race-high 136 laps, while Sam Mayer won the second stage, leading 40 laps. At race's end, Kvapil finished second, and Jesse Love finished third. Brent Crews and Taylor Gray rounded out the top five, while Mayer, Jeremy Clements, William Sawalich, Austin Hill, and Anthony Alfredo rounded out the top ten.

== Report ==
=== Background ===
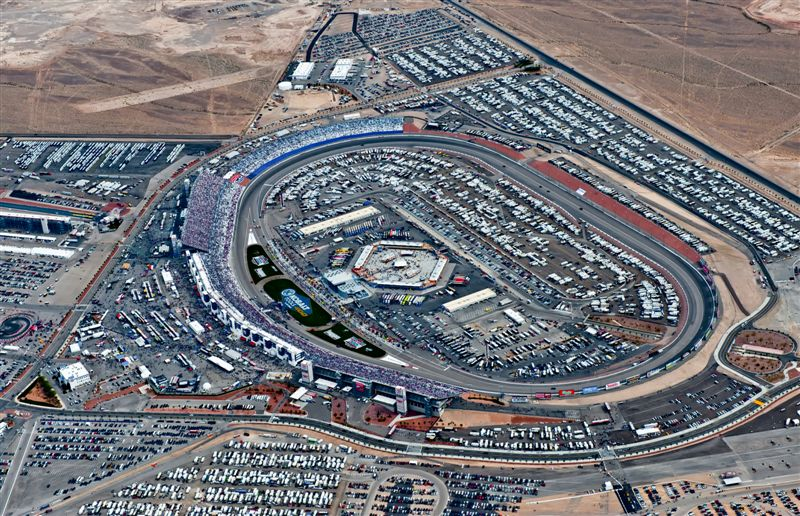
Las Vegas Motor Speedway, the track where the race will be held.

Las Vegas Motor Speedway, located in Clark County, Nevada outside the Las Vegas city limits and about 15 miles northeast of the Las Vegas Strip, is a 1,200-acre (490 ha) complex of multiple tracks for motorsports racing. The complex is owned by Speedway Motorsports, Inc., which is headquartered in Charlotte, North Carolina.

==== Entry list ====
- (R) denotes rookie driver.
- (CC) denotes chase contender.
- (OC) denotes owners' chase contender car.

#	Driver	Team	Make
00	Sheldon Creed (CC)	Haas Factory Team	Chevrolet
0	Garrett Smithley	SS-Green Light Racing	Chevrolet
1	Carson Kvapil (CC)	JR Motorsports	Chevrolet
02	Ryan Ellis	Young's Motorsports	Chevrolet
2	Jesse Love (CC)	Richard Childress Racing	Chevrolet
07	Josh Bilicki	SS-Green Light Racing	Chevrolet
7	Justin Allgaier (CC)	JR Motorsports	Chevrolet
8	Sammy Smith (CC)	JR Motorsports	Chevrolet
17	Corey Day (CC)	Hendrick Motorsports	Chevrolet
18	William Sawalich	Joe Gibbs Racing	Toyota
19	Brent Crews (OC) (R)	Joe Gibbs Racing	Toyota
20	Brandon Jones (CC)	Joe Gibbs Racing	Toyota
21	Austin Hill (CC)	Richard Childress Racing	Chevrolet
24	Harrison Burton	Sam Hunt Racing	Toyota
26	Dean Thompson	Sam Hunt Racing	Toyota
27	Jeb Burton	Jordan Anderson Racing	Chevrolet
28	Kyle Sieg	RSS Racing	Chevrolet
31	Blaine Perkins	Jordan Anderson Racing	Chevrolet
32	Andrew Patterson	Jordan Anderson Racing	Chevrolet
39	Ryan Sieg	RSS Racing	Chevrolet
41	Sam Mayer (CC)	Haas Factory Team	Chevrolet
42	Matt DiBenedetto	Young's Motorsports	Chevrolet
44	Brennan Poole	Alpha Prime Racing	Ford
45	Lavar Scott (R)	Alpha Prime Racing	Chevrolet
47	Dawson Cram	Mike Harmon Racing	Chevrolet
48	Patrick Staropoli (R)	Big Machine Racing	Chevrolet
51	Jeremy Clements	Jeremy Clements Racing	Chevrolet
53	Blake Lothian	Joey Gase Motorsports	Chevrolet
54	Taylor Gray (CC)	Joe Gibbs Racing	Toyota
55	Joey Gase	Joey Gase Motorsports	Ford
87	Lee Pulliam	Peterson Racing	Chevrolet
88	Rajah Caruth (CC)	JR Motorsports	Chevrolet
91	Mason Maggio	DGM Racing	Chevrolet
92	Josh Williams	DGM Racing	Chevrolet
96	Anthony Alfredo	Viking Motorsports	Chevrolet
99	Parker Retzlaff (CC)	Viking Motorsports	Chevrolet
Official entry list

== Practice ==
The first and only practice session was held on Saturday, October 3, at 11:00 AM PST, and lasted for 50 minutes.

Jeremy Clements, driving for his own team, Jeremy Clements Racing, set the fastest time in the session with a lap of 29.996 seconds, and a speed of 180.024 miles per hour (289.721 km/h).

=== Practice results ===
Pos.	#	Driver	Team	Make	Time	Speed
1	51	Jeremy Clements	Jeremy Clements Racing	Chevrolet	29.996	180.024
2	20	Brandon Jones (CC)	Joe Gibbs Racing	Toyota	30.325	178.071
3	54	Taylor Gray (CC)	Joe Gibbs Racing	Toyota	30.401	177.626
Full practice results

== Qualifying ==
Qualifying was held on Saturday, October 3, at 12:05 PM PST. Since Las Vegas Motor Speedway is an intermediate racetrack, the qualifying procedure used was a single-car, one-lap system with one round. Drivers were on track by themselves and had one lap to post a qualifying time, and whoever set the fastest time won the pole.

Corey Day, driving for Hendrick Motorsports, qualified on pole position with a lap of 29.858 seconds, and a speed of 180.856 miles per hour (291.060 km/h).

No drivers failed to qualify.

=== Qualifying results ===
Pos.	#	Driver	Team	Make	Time	Speed
1	17	Corey Day (CC)	Hendrick Motorsports	Chevrolet	29.858	180.856
2	00	Sheldon Creed (CC)	Haas Factory Team	Chevrolet	29.877	180.741
3	20	Brandon Jones (CC)	Joe Gibbs Racing	Toyota	29.918	180.493
4	19	Brent Crews (OC) (R)	Joe Gibbs Racing	Toyota	29.934	180.397
5	54	Taylor Gray (CC)	Joe Gibbs Racing	Toyota	29.986	180.084
6	88	Rajah Caruth (CC)	JR Motorsports	Chevrolet	30.021	179.874
7	7	Justin Allgaier (CC)	JR Motorsports	Chevrolet	30.044	179.736
8	41	Sam Mayer (CC)	Haas Factory Team	Chevrolet	30.045	179.730
9	1	Carson Kvapil (CC)	JR Motorsports	Chevrolet	30.333	178.024
10	2	Jesse Love (CC)	Richard Childress Racing	Chevrolet	30.386	177.713
11	24	Harrison Burton	Sam Hunt Racing	Toyota	30.426	177.480
12	21	Austin Hill (CC)	Richard Childress Racing	Chevrolet	30.429	177.462
13	48	Patrick Staropoli (R)	Big Machine Racing	Chevrolet	30.530	176.875
14	27	Jeb Burton	Jordan Anderson Racing	Chevrolet	30.535	176.846
15	32	Andrew Patterson	Jordan Anderson Racing	Chevrolet	30.620	176.355
16	44	Brennan Poole	Alpha Prime Racing	Ford	30.621	176.350
17	99	Parker Retzlaff (CC)	Viking Motorsports	Chevrolet	30.628	176.309
18	96	Anthony Alfredo	Viking Motorsports	Chevrolet	30.654	176.160
19	28	Kyle Sieg	RSS Racing	Chevrolet	30.665	176.097
20	39	Ryan Sieg	RSS Racing	Chevrolet	30.732	175.713
21	51	Jeremy Clements	Jeremy Clements Racing	Chevrolet	30.740	175.667
22	26	Dean Thompson	Sam Hunt Racing	Toyota	30.845	175.069
23	8	Sammy Smith (CC)	JR Motorsports	Chevrolet	30.847	175.058
24	31	Blaine Perkins	Jordan Anderson Racing	Chevrolet	30.848	175.052
25	42	Matt DiBenedetto	Young's Motorsports	Chevrolet	30.911	174.695
26	87	Lee Pulliam	Peterson Racing	Chevrolet	31.017	174.098
27	91	Mason Maggio	DGM Racing	Chevrolet	31.158	173.310
28	92	Josh Williams	DGM Racing	Chevrolet	31.491	171.478
29	02	Ryan Ellis	Young's Motorsports	Chevrolet	31.536	171.233
30	45	Lavar Scott (R)	Alpha Prime Racing	Chevrolet	31.617	170.794
31	0	Garrett Smithley	SS-Green Light Racing	Chevrolet	31.658	170.573
32	53	Blake Lothian	Joey Gase Motorsports	Chevrolet	31.721	170.234
Qualified by owner's points
33	55	Joey Gase	Joey Gase Motorsports	Ford	31.946	169.035
34	07	Josh Bilicki	SS-Green Light Racing	Chevrolet	32.125	168.093
35	47	Dawson Cram	Mike Harmon Racing	Chevrolet	32.619	165.548
36	18	William Sawalich	Joe Gibbs Racing	Toyota	—	—
Official qualifying results
Official starting lineup

== Race ==
=== Race results ===
==== Stage Results ====
Stage One Laps: 45

Pos.	#	Driver	Team	Make	Pts
1	17	Corey Day (CC)	Hendrick Motorsports	Chevrolet	10
2	41	Sam Mayer (CC)	Haas Factoy Team	Chevrolet	9
3	88	Rajah Caruth (CC)	JR Motorsports	Chevrolet	8
4	20	Brandon Jones (CC)	Joe Gibbs Racing	Toyota	7
5	2	Jesse Love (CC)	Richard Childress Racing	Chevrolet	6
6	19	Brent Crews (OC) (R)	Joe Gibbs Racing	Toyota	5
7	39	Ryan Sieg	RSS Racing	Chevrolet	4
8	54	Taylor Gray (CC)	Joe Gibbs Racing	Toyota	3
9	21	Austin Hill (CC)	Richard Childress Racing	Chevrolet	2
10	7	Justin Allgaier (CC)	JR Motorsports	Chevrolet	1

Stage Two Laps: 45

Pos.	#	Driver	Team	Make	Pts
1	41	Sam Mayer (CC)	Haas Factoy Team	Chevrolet	10
2	17	Corey Day (CC)	Hendrick Motorsports	Chevrolet	9
3	88	Rajah Caruth (CC)	JR Motorsports	Chevrolet	8
4	1	Carson Kvapil (CC)	JR Motorsports	Chevrolet	7
5	51	Jeremy Clements	Jeremy Clements Racing	Chevrolet	6
6	18	William Sawalich	Joe Gibbs Racing	Toyota	5
7	19	Brent Crews (OC) (R)	Joe Gibbs Racing	Toyota	4
8	2	Jesse Love (CC)	Richard Childress Racing	Chevrolet	3
9	54	Taylor Gray (CC)	Joe Gibbs Racing	Toyota	2
10	39	Ryan Sieg	RSS Racing	Chevrolet	1

=== Final Stage Results ===
Stage Three Laps: 111

Fin	St	#	Driver	Team	Make	Laps	Led	Status	Pts
1	1	17	Corey Day (CC)	Hendrick Motorsports	Chevrolet	201	136	Running	75
2	9	1	Carson Kvapil (CC)	JR Motorsports	Chevrolet	201	3	Running	42
3	10	2	Jesse Love (CC)	Richard Childress Racing	Chevrolet	201	0	Running	43
4	4	19	Brent Crews (OC) (R)	Joe Gibbs Racing	Toyota	201	0	Running	42
5	5	54	Taylor Gray (CC)	Joe Gibbs Racing	Toyota	201	0	Running	37
6	8	41	Sam Mayer (CC)	Haas Factory Team	Chevrolet	201	40	Running	50
7	21	51	Jeremy Clements	Jeremy Clements Racing	Chevrolet	201	0	Running	36
8	36	18	William Sawalich	Joe Gibbs Racing	Toyota	201	5	Running	34
9	12	21	Austin Hill	Richard Childress Racing	Chevrolet	201	0	Running	30
10	18	96	Anthony Alfredo	Viking Motorsports	Chevrolet	201	2	Running	27
11	6	88	Rajah Caruth (CC)	JR Motorsports	Chevrolet	201	2	Running	42
12	20	39	Ryan Sieg	RSS Racing	Chevrolet	201	0	Running	30
13	2	00	Sheldon Creed (CC)	Haas Factory Team	Chevrolet	201	7	Running	24
14	11	24	Harrison Burton	Sam Hunt Racing	Toyota	200	0	Running	23
15	23	8	Sammy Smith (CC)	JR Motorsports	Chevrolet	200	0	Running	22
16	22	26	Dean Thompson	Sam Hunt Racing	Toyota	200	0	Running	21
17	16	44	Brennan Poole	Alpha Prime Racing	Ford	200	0	Running	20
18	26	87	Lee Pulliam	Peterson Racing	Chevrolet	199	0	Running	19
19	17	99	Parker Retzlaff (CC)	Viking Motorsports	Chevrolet	199	0	Running	18
20	19	28	Kyle Sieg	RSS Racing	Chevrolet	199	0	Running	17
21	14	27	Jeb Burton	Jordan Anderson Racing	Chevrolet	199	2	Running	16
22	15	32	Andrew Patterson	Jordan Anderson Racing	Chevrolet	199	0	Running	15
23	25	42	Matt DiBenedetto	Young's Motorsports	Chevrolet	199	0	Running	14
24	13	48	Patrick Staropoli (R)	Big Machine Racing	Chevrolet	198	0	Running	13
25	31	0	Garrett Smithley	SS-Green Light Racing	Chevrolet	198	0	Running	12
26	30	45	Lavar Scott (R)	Alpha Prime Racing	Chevrolet	198	0	Running	11
27	33	55	Joey Gase	Joey Gase Motorsports	Ford	198	0	Running	10
28	28	92	Josh Williams	DGM Racing	Chevrolet	197	0	Running	9
29	29	02	Ryan Ellis	Young's Motorsports	Chevrolet	197	0	Running	8
30	34	07	Josh Bilicki	SS-Green Light Racing	Chevrolet	195	0	Running	7
31	24	31	Blaine Perkins	Jordan Anderson Racing	Chevrolet	193	0	Running	6
32	32	53	Blake Lothian	Joey Gase Motorsports	Chevrolet	192	0	Running	5
33	27	91	Mason Maggio	DGM Racing	Chevrolet	175	0	Running	4
34	7	7	Justin Allgaier (CC)	JR Motorsports	Chevrolet	56	0	DVP	4
35	35	47	Dawson Cram	Mike Harmon Racing	Chevrolet	13	0	Transmission	2
36	3	20	Brandon Jones	Joe Gibbs Racing	Toyota	54	4	Accident	1
Official race results

=== Race statistics ===
- Lead changes: 15 among 9 different drivers
- Cautions/Laps: 3 for 21 laps
- Red flags: 0
- Time of race: 2 hours, 13 minutes and 38 seconds
- Average speed: 135.370 miles per hour (217.857 km/h)

== Standings after the race ==
Drivers' Championship standings

	Pos	Driver	Points
	1	Sheldon Creed	2,259
1	2	Carson Kvapil	2,240 (–19)
1	3	Jesse Love	2,237 (–22)
2	4	Justin Allgaier	2,228 (–31)
1	5	Corey Day	2,218 (–41)
1	6	Sam Mayer	2,207 (–52)
'1	7	Taylor Gray	2,168 (–91)
1	8	Sammy Smith	2,165 (–94)
	9	Austin Hill	2,159 (–100)
	10	Parker Retzlaff	2,142 (–117)
	11	Brandon Jones	2,122 (–137)
	12	Rajah Caruth	2,113 (–146)
Official driver's standings

Manufacturers' Championship standings

Pos	Manufacturer	Points
1	Chevrolet	1,479
2	Toyota	964 (–515)
3	Ford	255 (–1,224)

- Note: Only the first 12 positions are included for the driver standings.

Previous race: 2026 Food City 300	NASCAR O'Reilly Auto Parts Series; 2026 season	Next race: 2026 Blue Cross NC 300
