= 2026 Goodyear 400 =

NASCAR Cup Series race

Race details
- Race 6 of 36 in the 2026 NASCAR Cup Series
- Date: March 22, 2026
- Location: Darlington Raceway in Darlington, South Carolina
- Course: Permanent racing facility
- Course length: 1.366 miles (2.198 km)
- Distance: 293 laps, 400.238 mi (644.121 km)
- Weather: Clear 90 °F (32 °C)
- Average speed: 129.854 miles per hour (208.980 km/h)

Pole position
| Driver | Tyler Reddick | 23XI Racing |
- Time: 29.072

Most laps led
| Driver | Brad Keselowski | RFK Racing |
- Laps: 144

Fastest lap
| Driver | Bubba Wallace | 23XI Racing |
- Time: 29.999

Winner
| No. 45 | Tyler Reddick | 23XI Racing |

Television in the United States
- Network: FS1
- Announcers: Mike Joy, Clint Bowyer, and Kevin Harvick

Radio in the United States
- Radio: MRN
- Booth announcers: Alex Hayden, Mike Bagley, and Todd Gordon
- Turn announcers: Dave Moody (1 & 2) and Tim Catafalmo (3 & 4)

The 2026 Goodyear 400 was a NASCAR Cup Series race held on March 22, 2026, at Darlington Raceway in Darlington, South Carolina. Contested over 293 laps on the 1.366-mile (2.198 km) egg-shaped oval, it was the 70th running of the event, and the sixth race of the 2026 NASCAR Cup Series season.

Tyler Reddick won the race. Brad Keselowski finished 2nd, and Ryan Blaney finished 3rd. Carson Hocevar and Austin Cindric rounded out the top five, and Ty Gibbs, Daniel Suárez, William Byron, Chris Buescher, and Erik Jones rounded out the top ten.

== Report ==
=== Background ===
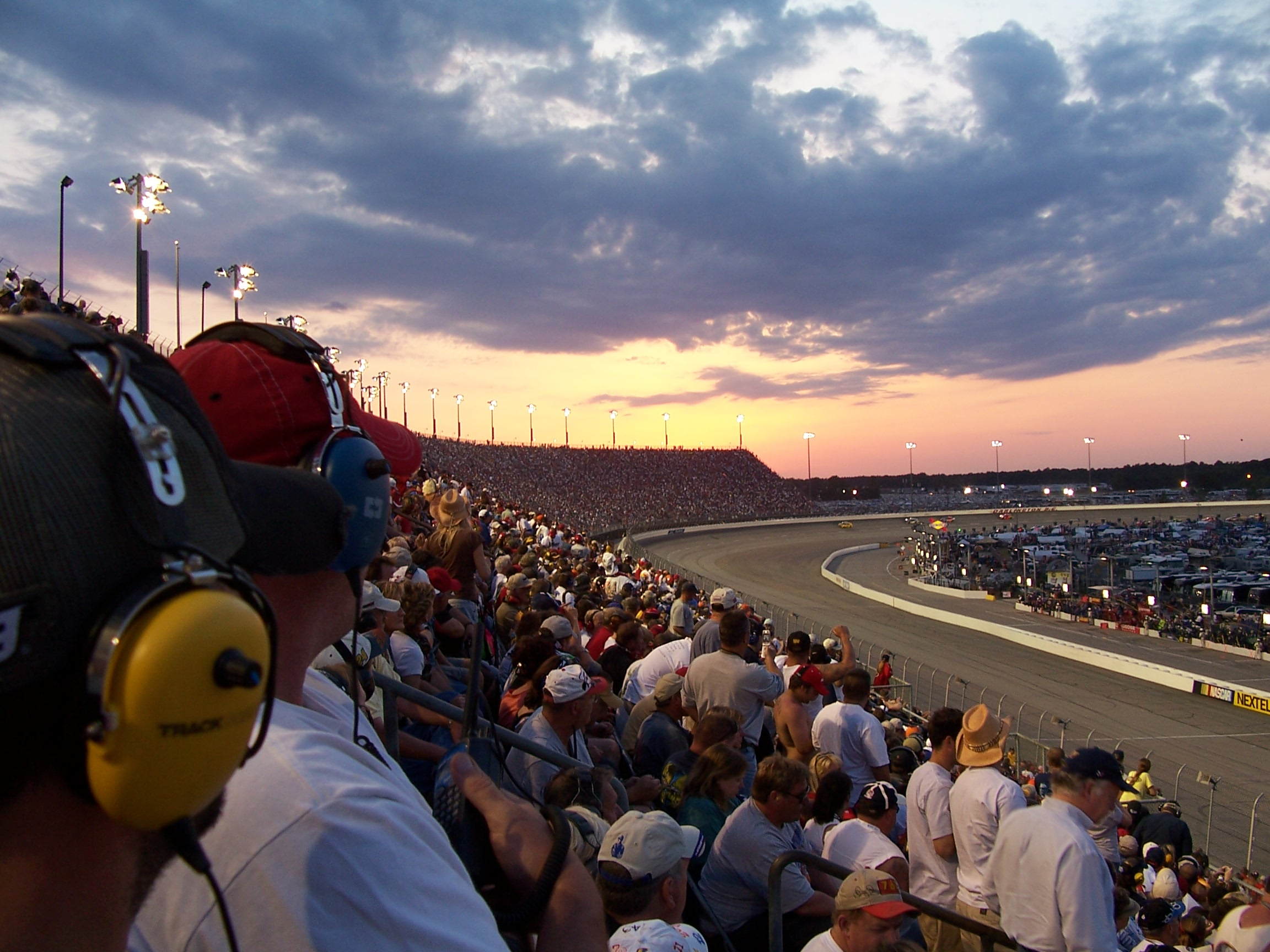
Darlington Raceway where the race was held.

Darlington Raceway is a race track built for NASCAR racing located near Darlington, South Carolina. It is nicknamed "The Lady in Black" and "The Track Too Tough to Tame" by many NASCAR fans and drivers and advertised as "A NASCAR Tradition." It is of a unique, somewhat egg-shaped design, an oval with the ends of very different configurations, a condition which supposedly arose from the proximity of one end of the track to a minnow pond the owner refused to relocate. This situation makes it very challenging for the crews to set up their cars' handling in a way that is effective at both ends.

Since 2015, the weekend has featured a retro-themed weekend. From 2015 until 2023, the race has hosted NASCAR's Throwback weekend, which featured cars sporting paint schemes that pay homage to past teams and drivers. In 2024, NASCAR changed the theme of the retro weekend to Alumni Weekend, featuring drivers, crew chiefs, and other personalities of the sport's past. The events feature the Legends Parade on Saturday morning, featuring cars, drivers, and other personalities from the sport's past. The 2026 Alumni Weekend will feature Kurt Busch and Harry Gant (2026 NASCAR Hall of Fame inductees) as the grand marshal, Mark Martin driving the safety car at the start of the race, and Dave Marcis presenting the winner's trophy.

During the offseason, NASCAR announced that Darlington would now get the short track package, as opposed to running the intermediate package from previous years.

==== Entry list ====
- (R) denotes rookie driver.
- (i) denotes driver who is ineligible for series driver points.

| No. | Driver | Team | Manufacturer |
|---|---|---|---|
| 1 | Ross Chastain | Trackhouse Racing | Chevrolet |
| 2 | Austin Cindric | Team Penske | Ford |
| 3 | Austin Dillon | Richard Childress Racing | Chevrolet |
| 4 | Noah Gragson | Front Row Motorsports | Ford |
| 5 | Kyle Larson | Hendrick Motorsports | Chevrolet |
| 6 | Brad Keselowski | RFK Racing | Ford |
| 7 | Daniel Suárez | Spire Motorsports | Chevrolet |
| 8 | Kyle Busch | Richard Childress Racing | Chevrolet |
| 9 | Chase Elliott | Hendrick Motorsports | Chevrolet |
| 10 | Ty Dillon | Kaulig Racing | Chevrolet |
| 11 | Denny Hamlin | Joe Gibbs Racing | Toyota |
| 12 | Ryan Blaney | Team Penske | Ford |
| 16 | A. J. Allmendinger | Kaulig Racing | Chevrolet |
| 17 | Chris Buescher | RFK Racing | Ford |
| 19 | Chase Briscoe | Joe Gibbs Racing | Toyota |
| 20 | Christopher Bell | Joe Gibbs Racing | Toyota |
| 21 | Josh Berry | Wood Brothers Racing | Ford |
| 22 | Joey Logano | Team Penske | Ford |
| 23 | Bubba Wallace | 23XI Racing | Toyota |
| 24 | William Byron | Hendrick Motorsports | Chevrolet |
| 34 | Todd Gilliland | Front Row Motorsports | Ford |
| 35 | Riley Herbst | 23XI Racing | Toyota |
| 38 | Zane Smith | Front Row Motorsports | Ford |
| 41 | Cole Custer | Haas Factory Team | Chevrolet |
| 42 | John Hunter Nemechek | Legacy Motor Club | Toyota |
| 43 | Erik Jones | Legacy Motor Club | Toyota |
| 45 | Tyler Reddick | 23XI Racing | Toyota |
| 47 | Ricky Stenhouse Jr. | Hyak Motorsports | Chevrolet |
| 48 | Justin Allgaier (i) | Hendrick Motorsports | Chevrolet |
| 51 | Cody Ware | Rick Ware Racing | Chevrolet |
| 54 | Ty Gibbs | Joe Gibbs Racing | Toyota |
| 60 | Ryan Preece | RFK Racing | Ford |
| 66 | Timmy Hill (i) | Garage 66 | Ford |
| 71 | Michael McDowell | Spire Motorsports | Chevrolet |
| 77 | Carson Hocevar | Spire Motorsports | Chevrolet |
| 88 | Connor Zilisch (R) | Trackhouse Racing | Chevrolet |
| 97 | Shane van Gisbergen | Trackhouse Racing | Chevrolet |
Official entry list

Alex Bowman, the original driver of the No. 48, was sidelined for the race due to vertigo sustained at Austin.

== Practice ==
Erik Jones & Riley Herbst were the fastest in the practice session, each with a time of 29.925 seconds and a speed of 164.331 mph (264.465 km/h).

=== Practice results ===
| Pos | No. | Driver | Team | Manufacturer | Time | Speed |
|---|---|---|---|---|---|---|
| 1 | 43 | Erik Jones | Legacy Motor Club | Toyota | 29.925 | 164.311 |
| 1 | 35 | Riley Herbst | 23XI Racing | Toyota | 29.925 | 164.311 |
| 3 | 2 | Austin Cindric | Team Penske | Ford | 30.017 | 163.827 |
Official practice results

== Qualifying ==
Tyler Reddick scored the pole for the race with a time of 29.072 and a speed of 169.152 mph (272.224 km/h).

=== Qualifying results ===
| Pos | No. | Driver | Team | Manufacturer | Time | Speed |
|---|---|---|---|---|---|---|
| 1 | 45 | Tyler Reddick | 23XI Racing | Toyota | 29.072 | 169.152 |
| 2 | 23 | Bubba Wallace | 23XI Racing | Toyota | 29.196 | 168.434 |
| 3 | 9 | Chase Elliott | Hendrick Motorsports | Chevrolet | 29.319 | 167.727 |
| 4 | 5 | Kyle Larson | Hendrick Motorsports | Chevrolet | 29.377 | 167.396 |
| 5 | 6 | Brad Keselowski | RFK Racing | Ford | 29.424 | 167.129 |
| 6 | 17 | Chris Buescher | RFK Racing | Ford | 29.443 | 167.021 |
| 7 | 12 | Ryan Blaney | Team Penske | Ford | 29.476 | 166.834 |
| 8 | 8 | Kyle Busch | Richard Childress Racing | Chevrolet | 29.478 | 166.823 |
| 9 | 11 | Denny Hamlin | Joe Gibbs Racing | Toyota | 29.500 | 166.698 |
| 10 | 3 | Austin Dillon | Richard Childress Racing | Chevrolet | 29.538 | 166.484 |
| 11 | 7 | Daniel Suárez | Spire Motorsports | Chevrolet | 29.550 | 166.416 |
| 12 | 2 | Austin Cindric | Team Penske | Ford | 29.570 | 166.304 |
| 13 | 24 | William Byron | Hendrick Motorsports | Chevrolet | 29.601 | 166.130 |
| 14 | 35 | Riley Herbst | 23XI Racing | Toyota | 29.613 | 166.062 |
| 15 | 48 | Justin Allgaier (i) | Hendrick Motorsports | Chevrolet | 29.624 | 166.001 |
| 16 | 77 | Carson Hocevar | Spire Motorsports | Chevrolet | 29.677 | 165.704 |
| 17 | 60 | Ryan Preece | RFK Racing | Ford | 29.708 | 165.531 |
| 18 | 47 | Ricky Stenhouse Jr. | Hyak Motorsports | Chevrolet | 29.721 | 165.459 |
| 19 | 38 | Zane Smith | Front Row Motorsports | Ford | 29.723 | 165.448 |
| 20 | 71 | Michael McDowell | Spire Motorsports | Chevrolet | 29.677 | 165.403 |
| 21 | 42 | John Hunter Nemechek | Legacy Motor Club | Toyota | 29.776 | 165.153 |
| 22 | 20 | Christopher Bell | Joe Gibbs Racing | Toyota | 29.785 | 165.103 |
| 23 | 19 | Chase Briscoe | Joe Gibbs Racing | Toyota | 29.819 | 164.915 |
| 24 | 43 | Erik Jones | Legacy Motor Club | Toyota | 29.825 | 164.882 |
| 25 | 1 | Ross Chastain | Trackhouse Racing | Chevrolet | 29.847 | 164.760 |
| 26 | 21 | Josh Berry | Wood Brothers Racing | Ford | 29.878 | 164.589 |
| 27 | 16 | A. J. Allmendinger | Kaulig Racing | Chevrolet | 29.885 | 164.551 |
| 28 | 54 | Ty Gibbs | Joe Gibbs Racing | Toyota | 29.889 | 164.529 |
| 29 | 22 | Joey Logano | Team Penske | Ford | 29.912 | 164.402 |
| 30 | 4 | Noah Gragson | Front Row Motorsports | Ford | 29.980 | 164.029 |
| 31 | 34 | Todd Gilliland | Front Row Motorsports | Ford | 29.997 | 163.936 |
| 32 | 88 | Connor Zilisch (R) | Trackhouse Racing | Chevrolet | 30.091 | 163.424 |
| 33 | 97 | Shane van Gisbergen | Trackhouse Racing | Chevrolet | 30.125 | 163.240 |
| 34 | 51 | Cody Ware | Rick Ware Racing | Chevrolet | 30.309 | 162.249 |
| 35 | 41 | Cole Custer | Haas Factory Team | Chevrolet | 30.422 | 161.646 |
| 36 | 10 | Ty Dillon | Kaulig Racing | Chevrolet | 30.584 | 160.790 |
| 37 | 66 | Timmy Hill (i) | Garage 66 | Ford | 32.044 | 153.464 |
Official qualifying results

== Race ==
=== Race results ===
==== Stage results ====
Stage One Laps: 90

| Pos | No | Driver | Team | Manufacturer | Points |
|---|---|---|---|---|---|
| 1 | 6 | Brad Keselowski | RFK Racing | Ford | 10 |
| 2 | 45 | Tyler Reddick | 23XI Racing | Toyota | 9 |
| 3 | 12 | Ryan Blaney | Team Penske | Ford | 8 |
| 4 | 23 | Bubba Wallace | 23XI Racing | Toyota | 7 |
| 5 | 5 | Kyle Larson | Hendrick Motorsports | Chevrolet | 6 |
| 6 | 17 | Chris Buescher | RFK Racing | Ford | 5 |
| 7 | 9 | Chase Elliott | Hendrick Motorsports | Chevrolet | 4 |
| 8 | 2 | Austin Cindric | Team Penske | Ford | 3 |
| 9 | 7 | Daniel Suárez | Spire Motorsports | Chevrolet | 2 |
| 10 | 24 | William Byron | Hendrick Motorsports | Chevrolet | 1 |

Stage Two Laps: 95

| Pos | No | Driver | Team | Manufacturer | Points |
|---|---|---|---|---|---|
| 1 | 6 | Brad Keselowski | RFK Racing | Ford | 10 |
| 2 | 17 | Chris Buescher | RFK Racing | Ford | 9 |
| 3 | 5 | Kyle Larson | Hendrick Motorsports | Chevrolet | 8 |
| 4 | 19 | Chase Briscoe | Joe Gibbs Racing | Toyota | 7 |
| 5 | 45 | Tyler Reddick | 23XI Racing | Toyota | 6 |
| 6 | 60 | Ryan Preece | RFK Racing | Ford | 5 |
| 7 | 24 | William Byron | Hendrick Motorsports | Chevrolet | 4 |
| 8 | 2 | Austin Cindric | Team Penske | Ford | 3 |
| 9 | 54 | Ty Gibbs | Joe Gibbs Racing | Toyota | 2 |
| 10 | 7 | Daniel Suárez | Spire Motorsports | Chevrolet | 1 |

=== Final Stage results ===
Stage Three Laps: 108

| Pos | Grid | No | Driver | Team | Manufacturer | Laps | Points |
|---|---|---|---|---|---|---|---|
| 1 | 1 | 45 | Tyler Reddick | 23XI Racing | Toyota | 293 | 70 |
| 2 | 5 | 6 | Brad Keselowski | RFK Racing | Ford | 293 | 55 |
| 3 | 7 | 12 | Ryan Blaney | Team Penske | Ford | 293 | 42 |
| 4 | 16 | 77 | Carson Hocevar | Spire Motorsports | Chevrolet | 293 | 33 |
| 5 | 12 | 2 | Austin Cindric | Team Penske | Ford | 293 | 38 |
| 6 | 28 | 54 | Ty Gibbs | Joe Gibbs Racing | Toyota | 293 | 33 |
| 7 | 11 | 7 | Daniel Suárez | Spire Motorsports | Chevrolet | 293 | 33 |
| 8 | 13 | 24 | William Byron | Hendrick Motorsports | Chevrolet | 293 | 34 |
| 9 | 6 | 17 | Chris Buescher | RFK Racing | Ford | 293 | 42 |
| 10 | 24 | 43 | Erik Jones | Legacy Motor Club | Toyota | 293 | 27 |
| 11 | 9 | 11 | Denny Hamlin | Joe Gibbs Racing | Toyota | 293 | 26 |
| 12 | 23 | 19 | Chase Briscoe | Joe Gibbs Racing | Toyota | 293 | 32 |
| 13 | 17 | 60 | Ryan Preece | RFK Racing | Ford | 293 | 29 |
| 14 | 33 | 97 | Shane van Gisbergen | Trackhouse Racing | Chevrolet | 293 | 23 |
| 15 | 3 | 9 | Chase Elliott | Hendrick Motorsports | Chevrolet | 293 | 26 |
| 16 | 25 | 1 | Ross Chastain | Trackhouse Racing | Chevrolet | 293 | 21 |
| 17 | 26 | 21 | Josh Berry | Wood Brothers Racing | Ford | 293 | 20 |
| 18 | 32 | 88 | Connor Zilisch (R) | Trackhouse Racing | Chevrolet | 293 | 19 |
| 19 | 22 | 20 | Christopher Bell | Joe Gibbs Racing | Toyota | 292 | 18 |
| 20 | 20 | 71 | Michael McDowell | Spire Motorsports | Chevrolet | 292 | 17 |
| 21 | 8 | 8 | Kyle Busch | Richard Childress Racing | Chevrolet | 292 | 16 |
| 22 | 19 | 38 | Zane Smith | Front Row Motorsports | Ford | 292 | 15 |
| 23 | 31 | 34 | Todd Gilliland | Front Row Motorsports | Ford | 292 | 14 |
| 24 | 15 | 48 | Justin Allgaier (i) | Hendrick Motorsports | Chevrolet | 292 | 0 |
| 25 | 10 | 3 | Austin Dillon | Richard Childress Racing | Chevrolet | 292 | 12 |
| 26 | 30 | 4 | Noah Gragson | Front Row Motorsports | Ford | 291 | 11 |
| 27 | 21 | 42 | John Hunter Nemechek | Legacy Motor Club | Toyota | 291 | 10 |
| 28 | 35 | 41 | Cole Custer | Haas Factory Team | Chevrolet | 291 | 9 |
| 29 | 18 | 47 | Ricky Stenhouse Jr. | Hyak Motorsports | Chevrolet | 291 | 8 |
| 30 | 27 | 16 | A. J. Allmendinger | Kaulig Racing | Chevrolet | 291 | 7 |
| 31 | 36 | 10 | Ty Dillon | Kaulig Racing | Chevrolet | 291 | 6 |
| 32 | 4 | 5 | Kyle Larson | Hendrick Motorsports | Chevrolet | 291 | 19 |
| 33 | 29 | 22 | Joey Logano | Team Penske | Ford | 290 | 4 |
| 34 | 2 | 23 | Bubba Wallace | 23XI Racing | Toyota | 288 | 11 |
| 35 | 14 | 35 | Riley Herbst | 23XI Racing | Toyota | 288 | 2 |
| 36 | 34 | 51 | Cody Ware | Rick Ware Racing | Chevrolet | 285 | 1 |
| 37 | 37 | 66 | Timmy Hill (i) | Garage 66 | Ford | 52 | 0 |
Official race results

=== Race statistics ===
- Lead changes: 16 among 8 different drivers
- Cautions/Laps: 4 for 26
- Red flags: 0
- Time of race: 3 hours, 4 minutes, and 56 seconds
- Average speed: 129.854 miles per hour (208.980 km/h)

== Media ==
=== Television ===
The race was carried by FS1 in the United States. Mike Joy, Clint Bowyer, and Kevin Harvick called the race from the broadcast booth. Jamie Little, Regan Smith, and Josh Sims handled the pit road for the television side. Larry McReynolds provided insight on-site during the race.

FS1
| Booth announcers | Pit reporters | In-race analyst |
|---|---|---|
| Lap-by-lap: Mike Joy; Color-commentator: Clint Bowyer; Color-commentator: Kevin Harvick | Jamie Little; Regan Smith; Josh Sims | Larry McReynolds |

=== Radio ===
MRN had the radio call for the race, which was also simulcast on Sirius XM NASCAR Radio.

MRN Radio
| Booth announcers | Turn announcers | Pit reporters |
|---|---|---|
| Lead announcer: Alex Hayden; Announcer: Mike Bagley; Announcer: Todd Gordon | Turns 1 & 2: Dave Moody; Turns 3 & 4: Tim Catafalmo | Steve Post; Kim Coon; Wendy Venturini |

== Standings after the race ==
Drivers' Championship standings

| | Pos | Driver | Points |
|---|---|---|---|
| | 1 | Tyler Reddick | 325 |
| 1 | 2 | Ryan Blaney | 230 (–95) |
| 1 | 3 | Bubba Wallace | 205 (–120) |
| | 4 | Denny Hamlin | 203 (–122) |
| | 5 | Chase Elliott | 194 (–131) |
| 2 | 6 | William Byron | 191 (–134) |
| 2 | 7 | Chris Buescher | 188 (–137) |
| 2 | 8 | Christopher Bell | 182 (–143) |
| 3 | 9 | Brad Keselowski | 182 (–143) |
| 3 | 10 | Kyle Larson | 176 (–149) |
| 1 | 11 | Ty Gibbs | 173 (–152) |
| 1 | 12 | Ryan Preece | 154 (–171) |
| 2 | 13 | Carson Hocevar | 151 (–174) |
| 3 | 14 | Daniel Suárez | 150 (–175) |
| 1 | 15 | Shane van Gisbergen | 140 (–185) |
| 5 | 16 | Joey Logano | 139 (–186) |
Official driver's standings

Manufacturers' Championship standings

| Pos | Manufacturer | Points |
|---|---|---|
| 1 | Toyota | 310 |
| 2 | Ford | 214 (–96) |
| 3 | Chevrolet | 206 (–104) |

- Note: Only the first 16 positions are included for the driver standings.

| Previous race: 2026 Pennzoil 400 | NASCAR Cup Series; 2026 season | Next race: 2026 Cook Out 400 (Martinsville) |
