= 2026 Cracker Barrel 400 =

Race details
- Race 14 of 36 in the 2026 NASCAR Cup Series
- Date: May 31, 2026
- Location: Nashville Superspeedway in Lebanon, Tennessee
- Course: Permanent racing facility
- Course length: 1.333 miles (2.145 km)
- Distance: 300 laps, 400 mi (640 km)
- Average speed: 106.424 miles per hour (171.273 km/h)

Pole position
Driver	Denny Hamlin	Joe Gibbs Racing
- Grid positions set by competition-based formula

Most laps led
Driver	Denny Hamlin	Joe Gibbs Racing
- Laps: 57

Fastest lap
Driver	Denny Hamlin	Joe Gibbs Racing
- Time: 29.734

Winner
No. 11	Denny Hamlin	Joe Gibbs Racing

Television in the United States
- Network: Prime Video
- Announcers: Adam Alexander, Dale Earnhardt Jr., and Steve Letarte
- Nielsen ratings: 0.79 (1.655 million)

Radio in the United States
- Radio: PRN
- Booth announcers: Brad Gillie and Nick Yeoman
- Turn announcers: Doug Turnbull (1 & 2) and Pat Patterson (3 & 4)

The 2026 Cracker Barrel 400 was an NASCAR Cup Series race that was held on May 31, 2026, at Nashville Superspeedway in Lebanon, Tennessee. Contested over 300 laps on the 1 1/3-mile (2.146 km) speedway, it was the 14th race of the 2026 NASCAR Cup Series season.

Denny Hamlin won the race. Christopher Bell finished 2nd, and Chase Briscoe finished 3rd. Ricky Stenhouse Jr. and Shane van Gisbergen rounded out the top five, and Tyler Reddick, Chase Elliott, Ryan Blaney, Zane Smith, and Carson Hocevar rounded out the top ten.

== Report ==
=== Background ===
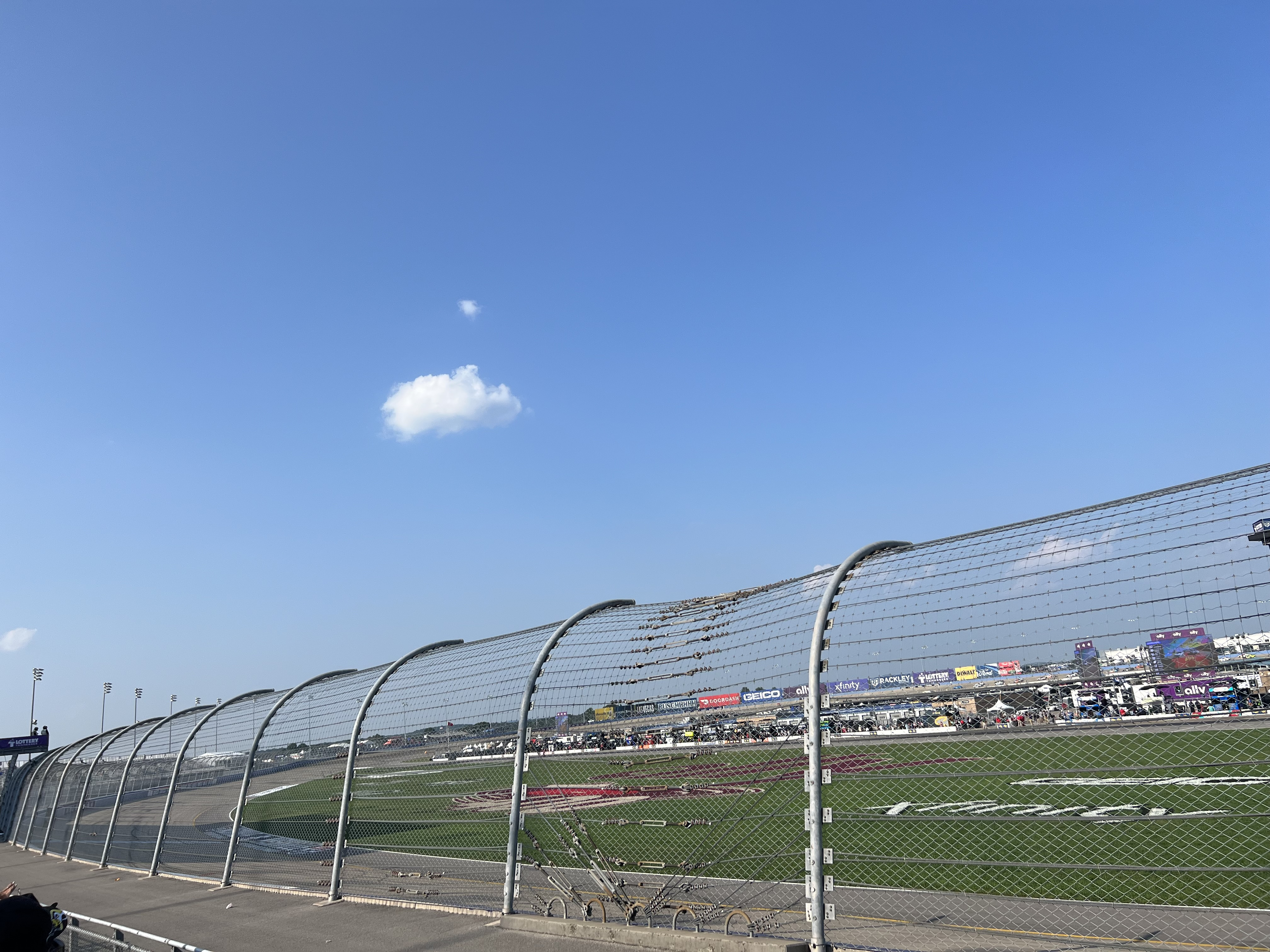
Nashville Superspeedway, where the race was held.

Nashville Superspeedway is a motor racing complex located in Lebanon, Tennessee, United States, about 30 miles (48 km) southeast of Nashville. The track was built in 2001 and is currently used for events, driving schools and GT Academy, a reality television competition.

It is a concrete oval track 1 1/3 miles (2.146 km) long. Nashville Superspeedway is owned by Dover Motorsports, Inc., which also owns Dover Motor Speedway. Nashville Superspeedway was the longest concrete oval in NASCAR during the time it was on the NASCAR O'Reilly Auto Parts Series and NASCAR Craftsman Truck Series circuits. Current permanent seating capacity is approximately 25,000. Additional portable seats are brought in for some events, and seating capacity can be expanded to 150,000. Infrastructure is in place to expand the facility to include a short track, drag strip, and road course.

On April 10, 2025, Cracker Barrel was announced as the title sponsor, replacing Ally.

Prior to the season, NASCAR announced that Nashville, along with 5 other tracks would run the new short track package rather than the intermediate package from 2021 to 2025.

==== Entry list ====
- (R) denotes rookie driver.
- (i) denotes driver who is ineligible for series driver points.

No.	Driver	Team	Manufacturer
1	Ross Chastain	Trackhouse Racing	Chevrolet
2	Austin Cindric	Team Penske	Ford
3	Austin Dillon	Richard Childress Racing	Chevrolet
4	Noah Gragson	Front Row Motorsports	Ford
5	Kyle Larson	Hendrick Motorsports	Chevrolet
6	Brad Keselowski	RFK Racing	Ford
7	Daniel Suárez	Spire Motorsports	Chevrolet
9	Chase Elliott	Hendrick Motorsports	Chevrolet
10	Ty Dillon	Kaulig Racing	Chevrolet
11	Denny Hamlin	Joe Gibbs Racing	Toyota
12	Ryan Blaney	Team Penske	Ford
16	A. J. Allmendinger	Kaulig Racing	Chevrolet
17	Chris Buescher	RFK Racing	Ford
19	Chase Briscoe	Joe Gibbs Racing	Toyota
20	Christopher Bell	Joe Gibbs Racing	Toyota
21	Josh Berry	Wood Brothers Racing	Ford
22	Joey Logano	Team Penske	Ford
23	Bubba Wallace	23XI Racing	Toyota
24	William Byron	Hendrick Motorsports	Chevrolet
33	Austin Hill (i)	Richard Childress Racing	Chevrolet
34	Todd Gilliland	Front Row Motorsports	Ford
35	Riley Herbst	23XI Racing	Toyota
38	Zane Smith	Front Row Motorsports	Ford
41	Cole Custer	Haas Factory Team	Chevrolet
42	John Hunter Nemechek	Legacy Motor Club	Toyota
43	Erik Jones	Legacy Motor Club	Toyota
45	Tyler Reddick	23XI Racing	Toyota
47	Ricky Stenhouse Jr.	Hyak Motorsports	Chevrolet
48	Alex Bowman	Hendrick Motorsports	Chevrolet
51	Cody Ware	Rick Ware Racing	Chevrolet
54	Ty Gibbs	Joe Gibbs Racing	Toyota
60	Ryan Preece	RFK Racing	Ford
66	Chad Finchum (i)	MBM Motorsports	Ford
67	Corey Heim (i)	23XI Racing	Toyota
71	Michael McDowell	Spire Motorsports	Chevrolet
77	Carson Hocevar	Spire Motorsports	Chevrolet
88	Connor Zilisch (R)	Trackhouse Racing	Chevrolet
97	Shane van Gisbergen	Trackhouse Racing	Chevrolet
Official entry list

== Practice ==
Christopher Bell was the fastest in the practice session with a time of 29.802 seconds and a speed of 160.660 mph (258.557 km/h).

=== Practice results ===
Pos	No.	Driver	Team	Manufacturer	Time	Speed
1	20	Christopher Bell	Joe Gibbs Racing	Toyota	29.802	160.660
2	1	Ross Chastain	Trackhouse Racing	Chevrolet	29.824	160.542
3	11	Denny Hamlin	Joe Gibbs Racing	Toyota	29.827	160.526
Official practice results

== Qualifying ==
Qualifying for the race was canceled due to inclement weather. Denny Hamlin was awarded the pole for the race as a result of NASCAR's pandemic formula with a score of 2.700.

=== Starting lineup ===
Pos	No.	Driver	Team	Manufacturer
1	11	Denny Hamlin	Joe Gibbs Racing	Toyota
2	45	Tyler Reddick	23XI Racing	Toyota
3	7	Daniel Suárez	Spire Motorsports	Chevrolet
4	20	Christopher Bell	Joe Gibbs Racing	Toyota
5	5	Kyle Larson	Hendrick Motorsports	Chevrolet
6	54	Ty Gibbs	Joe Gibbs Racing	Toyota
7	12	Ryan Blaney	Team Penske	Ford
8	24	William Byron	Hendrick Motorsports	Chevrolet
9	22	Joey Logano	Team Penske	Ford
10	97	Shane van Gisbergen	Trackhouse Racing	Chevrolet
11	38	Zane Smith	Front Row Motorsports	Ford
12	6	Brad Keselowski	RFK Racing	Ford
13	43	Erik Jones	Legacy Motor Club	Toyota
14	71	Michael McDowell	Spire Motorsports	Chevrolet
15	47	Ricky Stenhouse Jr.	Hyak Motorsports	Chevrolet
16	16	A. J. Allmendinger	Kaulig Racing	Chevrolet
17	77	Carson Hocevar	Spire Motorsports	Chevrolet
18	23	Bubba Wallace	23XI Racing	Toyota
19	48	Alex Bowman	Hendrick Motorsports	Chevrolet
20	41	Cole Custer	Haas Factory Team	Chevrolet
21	34	Todd Gilliland	Front Row Motorsports	Ford
22	17	Chris Buescher	RFK Racing	Ford
23	35	Riley Herbst	23XI Racing	Toyota
24	67	Corey Heim (i)	23XI Racing	Toyota
25	33	Austin Hill (i)	Richard Childress Racing	Chevrolet
26	4	Noah Gragson	Front Row Motorsports	Ford
27	42	John Hunter Nemechek	Legacy Motor Club	Toyota
28	60	Ryan Preece	RFK Racing	Ford
29	9	Chase Elliott	Hendrick Motorsports	Chevrolet
30	10	Ty Dillon	Kaulig Racing	Chevrolet
31	19	Chase Briscoe	Joe Gibbs Racing	Toyota
32	3	Austin Dillon	Richard Childress Racing	Chevrolet
33	21	Josh Berry	Wood Brothers Racing	Ford
34	51	Cody Ware	Rick Ware Racing	Chevrolet
35	1	Ross Chastain	Trackhouse Racing	Chevrolet
36	2	Austin Cindric	Team Penske	Ford
37	66	Chad Finchum (i)	Garage 66	Ford
38	88	Connor Zilisch (R)	Trackhouse Racing	Chevrolet
Official starting lineup

== Race ==
=== Race results ===
==== Stage results ====
Stage One Laps: 90

Pos	No	Driver	Team	Manufacturer	Points
1	16	A. J. Allmendinger	Kaulig Racing	Chevrolet	10
2	5	Kyle Larson	Hendrick Motorsports	Chevrolet	9
3	12	Ryan Blaney	Team Penske	Ford	8
4	9	Chase Elliott	Hendrick Motorsports	Chevrolet	7
5	45	Tyler Reddick	23XI Racing	Toyota	6
6	23	Bubba Wallace	23XI Racing	Toyota	5
7	24	William Byron	Hendrick Motorsports	Chevrolet	4
8	19	Chase Briscoe	Joe Gibbs Racing	Toyota	3
9	35	Riley Herbst	23XI Racing	Toyota	2
10	67	Corey Heim (i)	23XI Racing	Toyota	0

Stage Two Laps: 95

Pos	No	Driver	Team	Manufacturer	Points
1	7	Daniel Suárez	Spire Motorsports	Chevrolet	10
2	48	Alex Bowman	Hendrick Motorsports	Chevrolet	9
3	47	Ricky Stenhouse Jr.	Hyak Motorsports	Chevrolet	8
4	2	Austin Cindric	Team Penske	Ford	7
5	11	Denny Hamlin	Joe Gibbs Racing	Toyota	6
6	71	Michael McDowell	Spire Motorsports	Chevrolet	5
7	24	William Byron	Hendrick Motorsports	Chevrolet	4
8	20	Christopher Bell	Joe Gibbs Racing	Toyota	3
9	19	Chase Briscoe	Joe Gibbs Racing	Toyota	2
10	6	Brad Keselowski	RFK Racing	Ford	1

=== Final Stage results ===
Stage Three Laps: 115

Pos	Grid	No	Driver	Team	Manufacturer	Laps	Points
1	1	11	Denny Hamlin	Joe Gibbs Racing	Toyota	300	62
2	4	20	Christopher Bell	Joe Gibbs Racing	Toyota	300	38
3	31	19	Chase Briscoe	Joe Gibbs Racing	Toyota	300	39
4	15	47	Ricky Stenhouse Jr.	Hyak Motorsports	Chevrolet	300	41
5	10	97	Shane van Gisbergen	Trackhouse Racing	Chevrolet	300	32
6	2	45	Tyler Reddick	23XI Racing	Toyota	300	37
7	29	9	Chase Elliott	Hendrick Motorsports	Chevrolet	300	37
8	7	12	Ryan Blaney	Team Penske	Ford	300	37
9	11	38	Zane Smith	Front Row Motorsports	Ford	300	28
10	17	77	Carson Hocevar	Spire Motorsports	Chevrolet	300	27
11	13	43	Erik Jones	Legacy Motor Club	Toyota	300	26
12	30	10	Ty Dillon	Kaulig Racing	Chevrolet	300	25
13	6	54	Ty Gibbs	Joe Gibbs Racing	Toyota	300	24
14	9	22	Joey Logano	Team Penske	Ford	300	23
15	14	71	Michael McDowell	Spire Motorsports	Chevrolet	300	27
16	26	4	Noah Gragson	Front Row Motorsports	Ford	299	21
17	23	35	Riley Herbst	23XI Racing	Toyota	299	22
18	32	3	Austin Dillon	Richard Childress Racing	Chevrolet	299	19
19	3	7	Daniel Suárez	Spire Motorsports	Chevrolet	299	28
20	21	34	Todd Gilliland	Front Row Motorsports	Ford	299	17
21	20	41	Cole Custer	Haas Factory Team	Chevrolet	299	16
22	34	51	Cody Ware	Rick Ware Racing	Chevrolet	299	15
23	5	5	Kyle Larson	Hendrick Motorsports	Chevrolet	299	23
24	27	42	John Hunter Nemechek	Legacy Motor Club	Toyota	298	13
25	24	67	Corey Heim (i)	23XI Racing	Toyota	298	0
26	36	2	Austin Cindric	Team Penske	Ford	296	18
27	25	33	Austin Hill (i)	Richard Childress Racing	Chevrolet	293	0
28	37	66	Chad Finchum (i)	Garage 66	Ford	289	0
29	22	17	Chris Buescher	RFK Racing	Ford	286	8
30	8	24	William Byron	Hendrick Motorsports	Chevrolet	231	15
31	33	21	Josh Berry	Wood Brothers Racing	Ford	214	6
32	18	23	Bubba Wallace	23XI Racing	Toyota	202	10
33	19	48	Alex Bowman	Hendrick Motorsports	Chevrolet	202	13
34	12	6	Brad Keselowski	RFK Racing	Ford	191	4
35	16	16	A. J. Allmendinger	Kaulig Racing	Chevrolet	172	12
36	28	60	Ryan Preece	RFK Racing	Ford	90	1
37	35	1	Ross Chastain	Trackhouse Racing	Chevrolet	81	1
38	38	88	Connor Zilisch (R)	Trackhouse Racing	Chevrolet	71	1
Official race results

=== Race statistics ===
- Lead changes: 31 among 15 different drivers
- Cautions/Laps: 12 for 75 laps
- Red flags: 0
- Time of race: 3 hours, 44 minutes, and 57 seconds
- Average speed: 106.424 miles per hour (171.273 km/h)

== Media ==
=== Television ===
Prime Video covered the race on the television side. Adam Alexander, Dale Earnhardt Jr. and Steve Letarte called the race from the broadcast booth. Kim Coon, Marty Snider, and Trevor Bayne handled pit road for the television side.

Prime Video
Booth announcers	Pit reporters
Lap-by-lap: Adam Alexander; Color-commentator: Dale Earnhardt Jr. Color-commentator: Steve Letarte	Kim Coon; Marty Snider; Trevor Bayne

=== Radio ===
Radio coverage of the race was broadcast by the Performance Racing Network (PRN) and was also simulcasted on Sirius XM NASCAR Radio. Brad Gillie and Nick Yeoman called the race in the booth when the field races through the quad-oval. Doug Turnbull called the race from a billboard in turn 2 when the field raced through turns 1 and 2 and halfway down the backstretch. Pat Patterson called the race from a billboard outside of turn 3 when the field raced through the other half of the backstretch and through turns 3 and 4. Wendy Venturini, Heather DeBeaux, and Andrew Kurland were the pit reporters during the broadcast.

PRN
Booth announcers	Turn announcers	Pit reporters
Lead announcer: Brad Gillie; Announcer: Nick Yeoman	Turns 1 & 2: Doug Turnbull; Turns 3 & 4: Pat Patterson	Wendy Venturini; Heather DeBeaux; Andrew Kurland

== Standings after the race ==
Drivers' Championship standings

	Pos	Driver	Points
	1	Tyler Reddick	657
	2	Denny Hamlin	560 (–97)
	3	Ryan Blaney	483 (–174)
1	4	Chase Elliott	462 (–195)
1	5	Ty Gibbs	449 (–208)
	6	Kyle Larson	409 (–248)
1	7	Christopher Bell	399 (–258)
1	8	Chris Buescher	393 (–264)
	9	Carson Hocevar	383 (–274)
	10	Daniel Suárez	378 (–279)
1	11	William Byron	352 (–305)
2	12	Shane van Gisbergen	348 (–309)
2	13	Brad Keselowski	347 (–310)
1	14	Chase Briscoe	343 (–314)
2	15	Bubba Wallace	338 (–319)
1	16	Austin Cindric	306 (–351)
Official driver's standings

Manufacturers' Championship standings

Pos	Manufacturer	Points
1	Toyota	637
2	Chevrolet	583 (–54)
3	Ford	468 (–169)

- Note: Only the first 16 positions are included for the driver standings.

Previous race: 2026 Coca-Cola 600	NASCAR Cup Series; 2026 season	Next race: 2026 FireKeepers Casino 400
