= 2025 FireKeepers Casino 400 =

NASCAR Cup Series race

Race details
- Race 15 of 36 in the 2025 NASCAR Cup Series
- Date: June 8, 2025
- Location: Michigan International Speedway in Brooklyn, Michigan
- Course: Permanent racing facility
- Course length: 2.0 miles (3.2 km)
- Distance: 200 laps, 400 mi (640 km)
- Average speed: 142.574 miles per hour (229.451 km/h)

Pole position
Driver	Chase Briscoe	Joe Gibbs Racing
- Time: 36.826

Most laps led
Driver	William Byron	Hendrick Motorsports
- Laps: 98

Fastest lap
Driver	William Byron	Hendrick Motorsports
- Time: 37.300

Winner
No. 11	Denny Hamlin	Joe Gibbs Racing

Television in the United States
- Network: Prime Video
- Announcers: Adam Alexander, Dale Earnhardt Jr., and Steve Letarte

Radio in the United States
- Radio: MRN
- Booth announcers: Alex Hayden, Mike Bagley and Todd Gordon
- Turn announcers: Dave Moody (1–2) and Tim Catafalmo (3–4)

The 2025 FireKeepers Casino 400 was a NASCAR Cup Series race held on June 8, 2025, at Michigan International Speedway in Brooklyn, Michigan. Contested over 200 laps on the two-mile (3.2 km) D-shaped oval, it was the 15th race of the 2025 NASCAR Cup Series season and the first of three seeding races for the inaugural NASCAR In-Season Challenge.

Denny Hamlin won the race. Chris Buescher finished 2nd, and Ty Gibbs finished 3rd. Bubba Wallace and Kyle Larson rounded out the top five, and Ross Chastain, Zane Smith, Kyle Busch, Ryan Preece, and Brad Keselowski rounded out the top ten.

== Report ==
=== Background ===
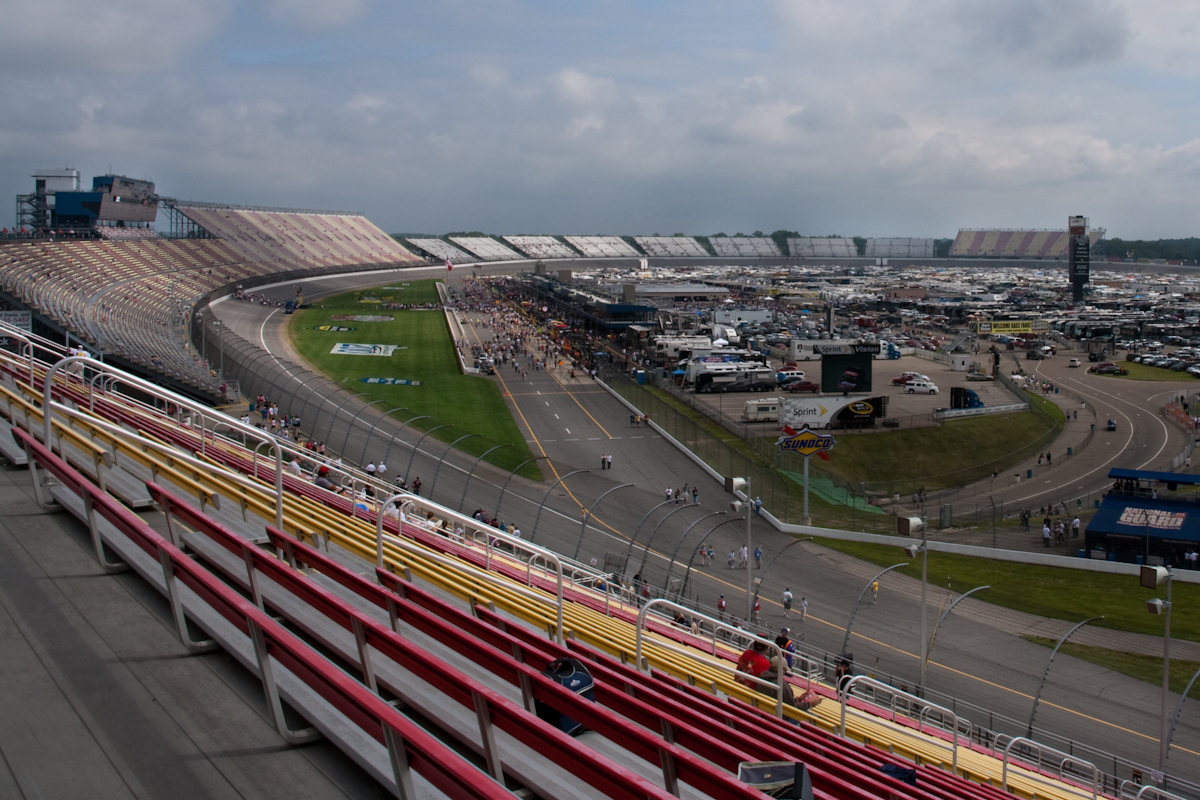
Michigan International Speedway, the track where the race was held.

The race was held at Michigan International Speedway, a two-mile (3.2 km) moderate-banked D-shaped speedway located in Brooklyn, Michigan. The track is used primarily for NASCAR events. It is known as a "sister track" to Texas World Speedway as MIS's oval design was a direct basis of TWS, with moderate modifications to the banking in the corners, and was used as the basis of Auto Club Speedway. The track is owned by International Speedway Corporation. Michigan International Speedway is recognized as one of motorsports' premier facilities because of its wide racing surface and high banking (by open-wheel standards; the 18-degree banking is modest by stock car standards).

==== Entry list ====
- (R) denotes rookie driver.
- (i) denotes driver who is ineligible for series driver points.

No.	Driver	Team	Manufacturer
1	Ross Chastain	Trackhouse Racing	Chevrolet
2	Austin Cindric	Team Penske	Ford
3	Austin Dillon	Richard Childress Racing	Chevrolet
4	Noah Gragson	Front Row Motorsports	Ford
5	Kyle Larson	Hendrick Motorsports	Chevrolet
6	Brad Keselowski	RFK Racing	Ford
7	Justin Haley	Spire Motorsports	Chevrolet
8	Kyle Busch	Richard Childress Racing	Chevrolet
9	Chase Elliott	Hendrick Motorsports	Chevrolet
10	Ty Dillon	Kaulig Racing	Chevrolet
11	Denny Hamlin	Joe Gibbs Racing	Toyota
12	Ryan Blaney	Team Penske	Ford
16	A. J. Allmendinger	Kaulig Racing	Chevrolet
17	Chris Buescher	RFK Racing	Ford
19	Chase Briscoe	Joe Gibbs Racing	Toyota
20	Christopher Bell	Joe Gibbs Racing	Toyota
21	Josh Berry	Wood Brothers Racing	Ford
22	Joey Logano	Team Penske	Ford
23	Bubba Wallace	23XI Racing	Toyota
24	William Byron	Hendrick Motorsports	Chevrolet
34	Todd Gilliland	Front Row Motorsports	Ford
35	Riley Herbst (R)	23XI Racing	Toyota
38	Zane Smith	Front Row Motorsports	Ford
41	Cole Custer	Haas Factory Team	Ford
42	John Hunter Nemechek	Legacy Motor Club	Toyota
43	Erik Jones	Legacy Motor Club	Toyota
45	Tyler Reddick	23XI Racing	Toyota
47	Ricky Stenhouse Jr.	Hyak Motorsports	Chevrolet
48	Alex Bowman	Hendrick Motorsports	Chevrolet
51	Cody Ware	Rick Ware Racing	Ford
54	Ty Gibbs	Joe Gibbs Racing	Toyota
60	Ryan Preece	RFK Racing	Ford
71	Michael McDowell	Spire Motorsports	Chevrolet
77	Carson Hocevar	Spire Motorsports	Chevrolet
88	Shane van Gisbergen (R)	Trackhouse Racing	Chevrolet
99	Daniel Suárez	Trackhouse Racing	Chevrolet
Official entry list

== Practice ==
Chase Briscoe was the fastest in the practice session with a time of 36.832 seconds and a speed of 195.482 mph (314.598 km/h).

=== Practice results ===
Pos	No.	Driver	Team	Manufacturer	Time	Speed
1	19	Chase Briscoe	Joe Gibbs Racing	Toyota	36.832	195.482
2	20	Christopher Bell	Joe Gibbs Racing	Toyota	36.848	195.397
3	17	Chris Buescher	RFK Racing	Ford	36.884	195.206
Official practice results

== Qualifying ==
Chase Briscoe scored the pole for the race with a time of 36.826 and a speed of 195.514 mph (314.649 km/h).

=== Qualifying results ===
Pos	No.	Driver	Team	Manufacturer	Time	Speed
1	19	Chase Briscoe	Joe Gibbs Racing	Toyota	36.826	195.514
2	8	Kyle Busch	Richard Childress Racing	Chevrolet	36.853	195.371
3	11	Denny Hamlin	Joe Gibbs Racing	Toyota	36.861	195.328
4	24	William Byron	Hendrick Motorsports	Chevrolet	36.878	195.238
5	5	Kyle Larson	Hendrick Motorsports	Chevrolet	36.889	195.180
6	17	Chris Buescher	RFK Racing	Ford	36.908	195.080
7	21	Josh Berry	Wood Brothers Racing	Ford	36.920	195.016
8	54	Ty Gibbs	Joe Gibbs Racing	Toyota	36.927	194.979
9	23	Bubba Wallace	23XI Racing	Toyota	36.937	194.926
10	38	Zane Smith	Front Row Motorsports	Ford	36.937	194.926
11	2	Austin Cindric	Team Penske	Ford	36.938	194.921
12	45	Tyler Reddick	23XI Racing	Toyota	36.954	194.837
13	12	Ryan Blaney	Team Penske	Ford	36.961	194.800
14	77	Carson Hocevar	Spire Motorsports	Chevrolet	36.973	194.737
15	22	Joey Logano	Team Penske	Ford	36.975	194.726
16	48	Alex Bowman	Hendrick Motorsports	Chevrolet	36.977	194.716
17	9	Chase Elliott	Hendrick Motorsports	Chevrolet	36.997	194.610
18	10	Ty Dillon	Kaulig Racing	Chevrolet	37.000	194.595
19	16	A. J. Allmendinger	Kaulig Racing	Chevrolet	37.013	194.526
20	1	Ross Chastain	Trackhouse Racing	Chevrolet	37.031	194.432
21	42	John Hunter Nemechek	Legacy Motor Club	Toyota	37.032	194.432
22	43	Erik Jones	Legacy Motor Club	Toyota	37.034	194.416
23	60	Ryan Preece	RFK Racing	Ford	37.052	194.321
24	41	Cole Custer	Haas Factory Team	Ford	37.052	194.321
25	20	Christopher Bell	Joe Gibbs Racing	Toyota	37.061	194.274
26	88	Shane van Gisbergen (R)	Trackhouse Racing	Chevrolet	37.075	194.201
27	6	Brad Keselowski	RFK Racing	Ford	37.081	194.170
28	3	Austin Dillon	Richard Childress Racing	Chevrolet	37.124	193.945
29	4	Noah Gragson	Front Row Motorsports	Ford	37.125	193.939
30	47	Ricky Stenhouse Jr.	Hyak Motorsports	Chevrolet	37.137	193.877
31	7	Justin Haley	Spire Motorsports	Chevrolet	37.149	193.814
32	71	Michael McDowell	Spire Motorsports	Chevrolet	37.151	193.804
33	34	Todd Gilliland	Front Row Motorsports	Ford	37.160	193.757
34	35	Riley Herbst (R)	23XI Racing	Toyota	37.183	193.637
35	99	Daniel Suárez	Trackhouse Racing	Chevrolet	37.230	193.392
36	51	Cody Ware	Rick Ware Racing	Ford	37.406	192.482
Official qualifying results

== Race ==
=== Race results ===
==== Stage results ====
Stage One Laps: 45

Pos	No	Driver	Team	Manufacturer	Points
1	17	Chris Buescher	RFK Racing	Ford	10
2	24	William Byron	Hendrick Motorsports	Chevrolet	9
3	11	Denny Hamlin	Joe Gibbs Racing	Toyota	8
4	19	Chase Briscoe	Joe Gibbs Racing	Toyota	7
5	21	Josh Berry	Wood Brothers Racing	Ford	6
6	12	Ryan Blaney	Team Penske	Ford	5
7	5	Kyle Larson	Hendrick Motorsports	Chevrolet	4
8	23	Bubba Wallace	23XI Racing	Toyota	3
9	8	Kyle Busch	Richard Childress Racing	Chevrolet	2
10	77	Carson Hocevar	Spire Motorsports	Chevrolet	1
Official stage one results

Stage Two Laps: 75

Pos	No	Driver	Team	Manufacturer	Points
1	24	William Byron	Hendrick Motorsports	Chevrolet	10
2	2	Austin Cindric	Team Penske	Ford	9
3	77	Carson Hocevar	Spire Motorsports	Chevrolet	8
4	45	Tyler Reddick	23XI Racing	Toyota	7
5	1	Ross Chastain	Trackhouse Racing	Chevrolet	6
6	60	Ryan Preece	RFK Racing	Ford	5
7	23	Bubba Wallace	23XI Racing	Toyota	4
8	11	Denny Hamlin	Joe Gibbs Racing	Toyota	3
9	10	Ty Dillon	Kaulig Racing	Chevrolet	2
10	43	Erik Jones	Legacy Motor Club	Toyota	1
Official stage two results

=== Final Stage results ===
Stage Three Laps: 80

Pos	Grid	No	Driver	Team	Manufacturer	Laps	Points
1	3	11	Denny Hamlin	Joe Gibbs Racing	Toyota	200	51
2	6	17	Chris Buescher	RFK Racing	Ford	200	45
3	8	54	Ty Gibbs	Joe Gibbs Racing	Toyota	200	34
4	9	23	Bubba Wallace	23XI Racing	Toyota	200	40
5	5	5	Kyle Larson	Hendrick Motorsports	Chevrolet	200	36
6	20	1	Ross Chastain	Trackhouse Racing	Chevrolet	200	37
7	10	38	Zane Smith	Front Row Motorsports	Ford	200	30
8	2	8	Kyle Busch	Richard Childress Racing	Chevrolet	200	31
9	23	60	Ryan Preece	RFK Racing	Ford	200	33
10	27	6	Brad Keselowski	RFK Racing	Ford	200	27
11	22	43	Erik Jones	Legacy Motor Club	Toyota	200	27
12	7	21	Josh Berry	Wood Brothers Racing	Ford	200	31
13	12	45	Tyler Reddick	23XI Racing	Toyota	200	31
14	35	99	Daniel Suárez	Trackhouse Racing	Chevrolet	200	23
15	17	9	Chase Elliott	Hendrick Motorsports	Chevrolet	200	22
16	25	20	Christopher Bell	Joe Gibbs Racing	Toyota	200	21
17	19	16	A. J. Allmendinger	Kaulig Racing	Chevrolet	200	20
18	26	88	Shane van Gisbergen (R)	Trackhouse Racing	Chevrolet	200	19
19	28	3	Austin Dillon	Richard Childress Racing	Chevrolet	200	18
20	30	47	Ricky Stenhouse Jr.	Hyak Motorsports	Chevrolet	200	17
21	31	7	Justin Haley	Spire Motorsports	Chevrolet	200	16
22	15	22	Joey Logano	Team Penske	Ford	200	15
23	1	19	Chase Briscoe	Joe Gibbs Racing	Toyota	200	21
24	18	10	Ty Dillon	Kaulig Racing	Chevrolet	200	15
25	34	35	Riley Herbst (R)	23XI Racing	Toyota	200	12
26	36	51	Cody Ware	Rick Ware Racing	Ford	200	11
27	29	4	Noah Gragson	Front Row Motorsports	Ford	200	10
28	4	24	William Byron	Hendrick Motorsports	Chevrolet	200	29
29	14	77	Carson Hocevar	Spire Motorsports	Chevrolet	199	17
30	32	71	Michael McDowell	Spire Motorsports	Chevrolet	199	7
31	11	2	Austin Cindric	Team Penske	Ford	199	15
32	13	12	Ryan Blaney	Team Penske	Ford	196	10
33	33	34	Todd Gilliland	Front Row Motorsports	Ford	145	4
34	21	42	John Hunter Nemechek	Legacy Motor Club	Toyota	72	3
35	24	41	Cole Custer	Haas Factory Team	Ford	66	2
36	16	48	Alex Bowman	Hendrick Motorsports	Chevrolet	66	1
Official race results

=== Race statistics ===
- Lead changes: 15 among 11 different drivers
- Cautions/Laps: 7 for 33
- Red flags: 1 for 11 minutes and 32 seconds
- Time of race: 2 hours, 48 minutes, and 20 seconds
- Average speed: 142.574 miles per hour (229.451 km/h)

== Media ==
=== Television ===
Prime Video covered the race on the television side. Adam Alexander, two-time Michigan winner Dale Earnhardt Jr. and Steve Letarte called the race from the broadcast booth. Kim Coon, Marty Snider, and Trevor Bayne handled pit road for the television side.

Prime Video
Booth announcers	Pit reporters
Lap-by-lap: Adam Alexander; Color-commentator: Dale Earnhardt Jr. Color-commentator: Steve Letarte	Kim Coon; Marty Snider; Trevor Bayne

=== Radio ===
Radio coverage of the race was broadcast by Motor Racing Network (MRN) and simulcast on Sirius XM NASCAR Radio. Alex Hayden Mike Bagley & former championship Crew Chief Todd Gordon called the race in the booth while the field races on the front stretch. Lead MRN Turn Announcer Dave Moody called the race from a billboard outside of turn 2 when the field is racing through turns 1 and 2. Tim Catafalmo called the race from a platform outside of turn 3 when the field races through turns 3 and 4. Lead MRN Radio Pit Reporter Steve Post, Chris Wilner, Brienne Pedigo and Jason Toy worked pit road for the radio side.

MRN
Booth announcers	Turn announcers	Pit reporters
Lead announcer: Alex Hayden; Announcer: Mike Bagley; Announcer: Todd Gordon	Turns 1 & 2: Dave Moody; Turns 3 & 4: Tim Catafalmo	Steve Post; Chris Wilner; Brienne Pedigo; Jason Toy

== Standings after the race ==
Drivers' Championship standings

	Pos	Driver	Points
	1	William Byron	576
	2	Kyle Larson	535 (–41)
1	3	Denny Hamlin	494 (–82)
1	4	Christopher Bell	480 (–96)
	5	Chase Elliott	464 (–112)
	6	Tyler Reddick	460 (–116)
	7	Ryan Blaney	427 (–149)
1	8	Ross Chastain	414 (–162)
1	9	Joey Logano	395 (–181)
	10	Bubba Wallace	383 (–193)
	11	Chase Briscoe	363 (–213)
2	12	Chris Buescher	342 (–234)
1	13	Alex Bowman	335 (–241)
2	14	Ryan Preece	322 (–254)
	15	Kyle Busch	322 (–254)
3	16	Austin Cindric	318 (–258)
Official driver's standings

Manufacturers' Championship standings

Pos	Manufacturer	Points
1	Chevrolet	544
2	Toyota	533 (–11)
3	Ford	512 (–32)

- Note: Only the first 16 positions are included for the driver standings.
- . – Driver has clinched a position in the NASCAR Cup Series playoffs.

Previous race: 2025 Cracker Barrel 400	NASCAR Cup Series; 2025 season	Next race: 2025 Viva México 250
