= Haas Factory Team =

American professional stock car racing team

- Owner: Gene Haas
- Principal: Joe Custer (President)
- Base: Kannapolis, North Carolina
- Series: NASCAR Cup Series; NASCAR O'Reilly Auto Parts Series
- Race drivers: Cup Series: 41. Cole Custer; O'Reilly Auto Parts Series: 00. Dean Thompson; 41. John Hunter Nemechek
- Manufacturer: Chevrolet
- Opened: 2025
- Website: haasfactoryteam.com

Career
- Debut: Cup Series: 2025 Daytona 500 (Daytona); O'Reilly Auto Parts Series: 2025 United Rentals 300 (Daytona)
- Latest race: Cup Series: 2026 Season Finale 400 (Homestead); O'Reilly Auto Parts Series: 2026 O'Reilly Auto Parts 300 (Homestead)
- Races competed: Total: 138; Cup Series: 72; O'Reilly Auto Parts Series: 66
- Drivers' Championships: Total: 0 Cup Series: 0 O'Reilly Auto Parts Series: 0
- Race victories: Total: 4 Cup Series: 0 O'Reilly Auto Parts Series: 4
- Pole positions: Total: 7 Cup Series: 0 O'Reilly Auto Parts Series: 7

Haas Factory Team (HFT) is an American professional stock car racing team that competes in the NASCAR Cup Series and the NASCAR O'Reilly Auto Parts Series. The team is owned by Haas Automation founder Gene Haas. It made its debut in 2025, following the closure of Stewart–Haas Racing at the conclusion of the 2024 season.

The team is based and headquartered in Kannapolis, North Carolina – roughly 10 miles (16 km) north of Charlotte Motor Speedway – alongside sister team and Formula One entrant Haas F1 Team, though the two teams are separate entities. The team currently operates out of the same shop Stewart–Haas Racing operated out of prior to its closure.

== History ==
On May 28, 2024, it was announced that Stewart–Haas Racing would be shutting down the team's Cup and Xfinity teams following the 2024 season. Less than a month later, on June 20, Gene Haas announced he will keep one of the team's charters and reorganize the team as Haas Factory Team, with Joe Custer as the team president. Haas also announced the team will operate a two-car team in the Xfinity Series. The team will continue to run Ford Mustangs with a technical alliance with RFK Racing. In addition, the team has a technical alliances with RSS Racing in the O'Reilly Auto Parts Series.

On September 5, 2025, HFT announced it will switch to Chevrolet in 2026, with a technical alliance with Hendrick Motorsports. This marks Haas' return to Chevrolet after Stewart–Haas Racing switched to Ford in 2017.

On November 17, 2025, Jeremy Clements Racing announced they will have a technical alliance with HFT in the 2026 O'Reilly Auto Parts Series season.

== Cup Series ==
=== Car No. 41 history ===
Cole Custer (2025–present)

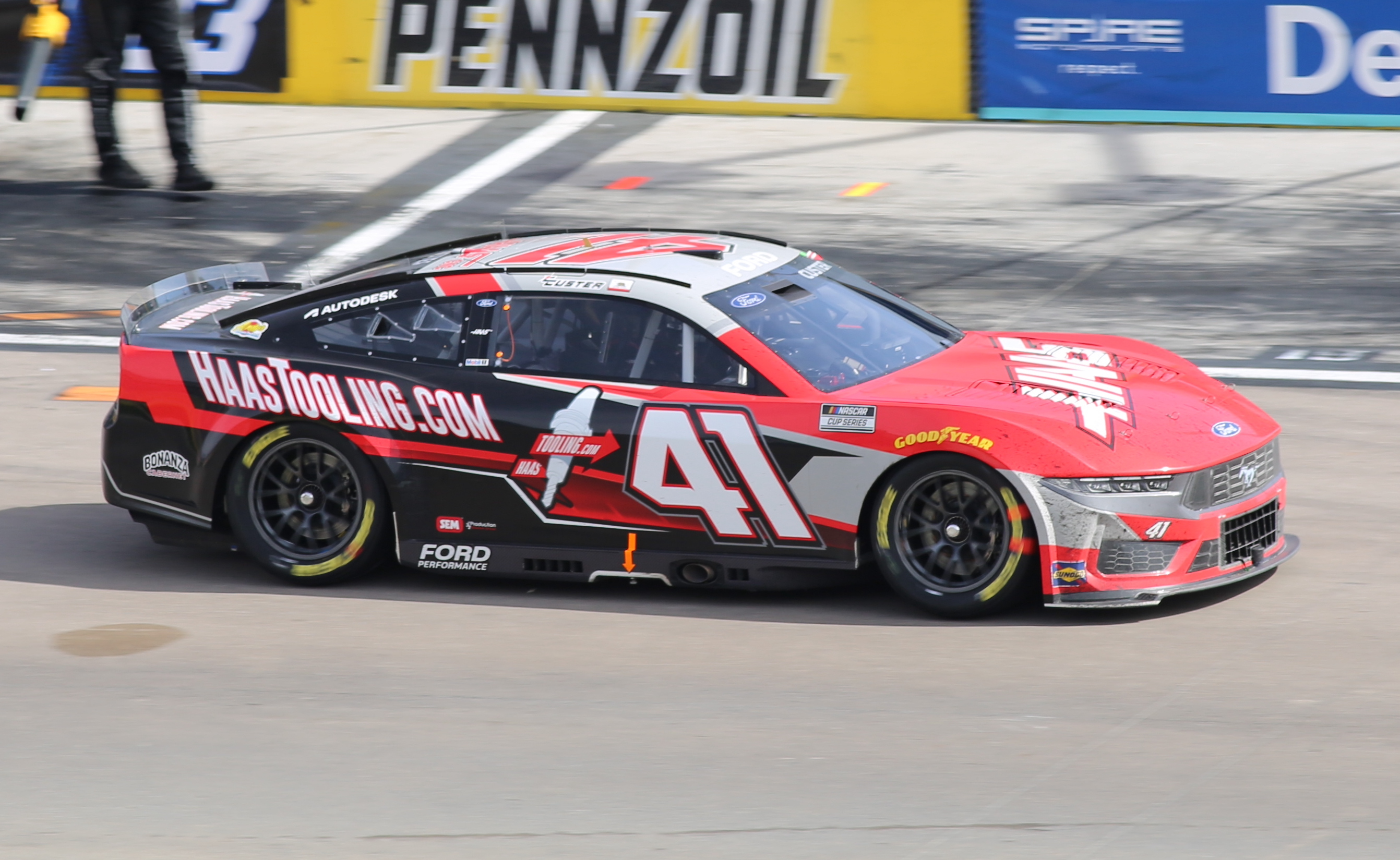
Cole Custer in the No. 41 car at Las Vegas Motor Speedway in 2025

The team retained one charter from Stewart–Haas Racing and currently runs a full-time entry in the No. 41 car with Cole Custer as the driver. Custer started the 2025 season with a 21st-place finish at the 2025 Daytona 500. He struggled throughout the season, with eighth at Mexico, fourth at the summer Daytona race, and fifth at fall Talladega race being his only top-ten finishes.

Custer started the 2026 season with a 24th-place finish at the Daytona 500.

==== Car No. 41 results ====
Year	Driver	No.	Make	1	2	3	4	5	6	7	8	9	10	11	12	13	14	15	16	17	18	19	20	21	22	23	24	25	26	27	28	29	30	31	32	33	34	35	36	Owners	Pts
2025	Cole Custer	41	Ford	DAY; 21	ATL; 36	COA; 23	PHO; 32	LVS; 26	HOM; 28	MAR; 33	DAR; 22	BRI; 29	TAL; 13	TEX; 19	KAN; 25	CLT; 21	NSS; 19	MCH; 35	MXC; 8	POC; 22	ATL; 19	CSC; 33	SON; 23	DOV; 29	IND; 20	IOW; 26	GLN; 34	RCH; 24	DAY; 4	DAR; 24	GTW; 27	BRI; 33	NHA; 24	KAN; 20	ROV; 22	LVS; 28	TAL; 5	MAR; 17	PHO; 25	32nd	486
2026	Cole Custer	41	Chevy	DAY; 24	ATL; 22	COA; 29	PHO; 35	LVS; 27	DAR; 28	MAR; 31	BRI; 28	KAN; 25	TAL; 38	TEX; 35	GLN; 15	CLT; 16	NSS; 21	MCH; 12	POC; 24	COR; 31	SON; 20	CHI; 31	ATL; 17	NWS; 28	IND; 13	IOW; 28	RCH; 29	NHA; 22	DAY; 10	DAR; 33	GTW; 11	BRI; 26	KAN; 30	LVS; 27	CLT; 27	PHO; 27	TAL; 5	MAR; 34	HOM; 29	33rd	450

== O'Reilly Auto Parts Series ==
=== Car No. 00 history ===
Sheldon Creed (2025–2026)

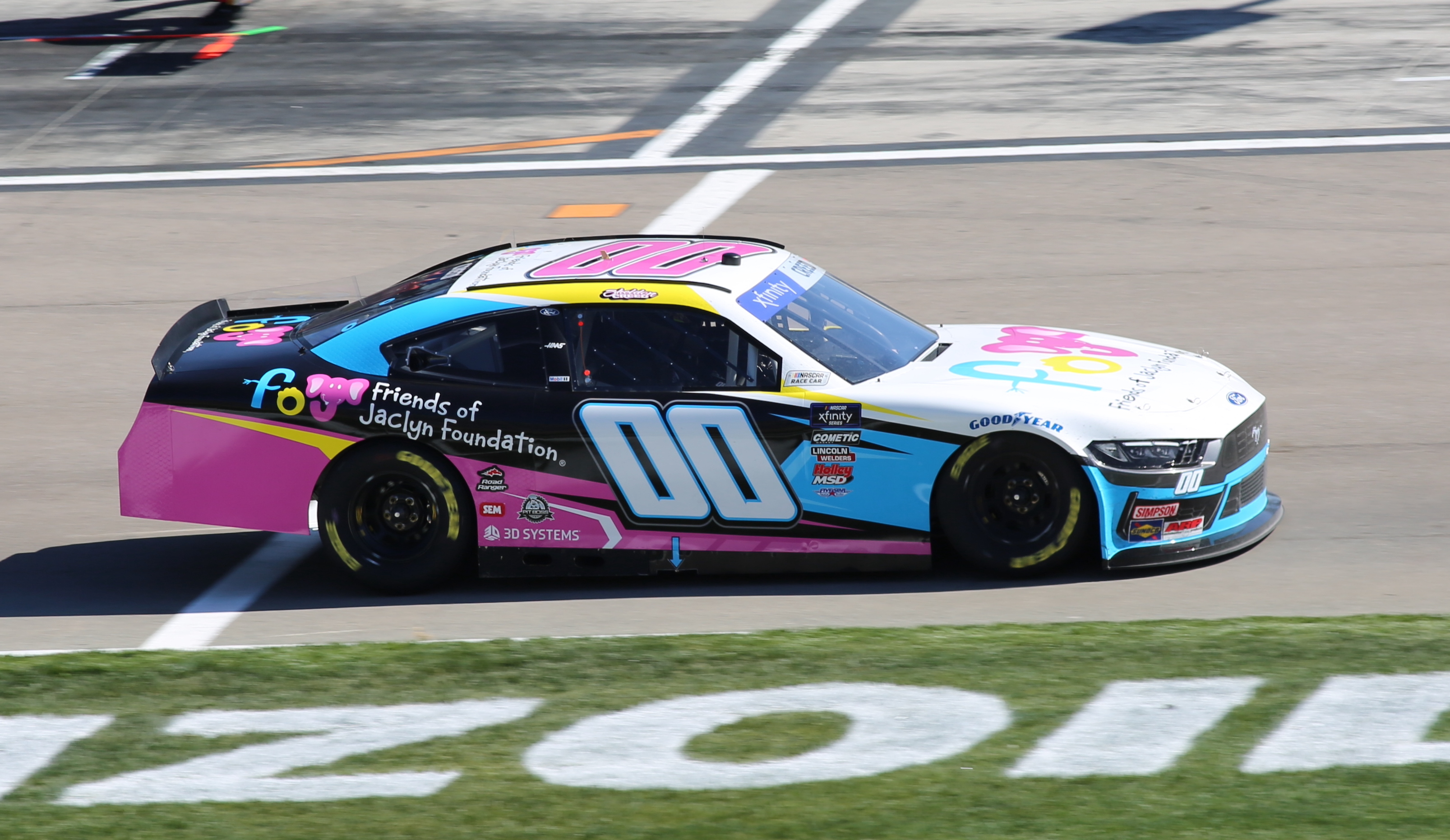
Sheldon Creed in the No. 00 car at Las Vegas Motor Speedway in 2025

On August 17, 2024, Haas Factory Team announced that it signed Sheldon Creed to drive the No. 00 car in 2025. Creed finished in the top-ten 23 times and scored sixteen top five finishes, including six runner-up finishes. Creed also scored two poles during the season and finished sixth in the final points standings.

Creed kicked off his 2026 season with a 24th place at Daytona, then finally broke his winless streak and claimed his first O'Reilly Series win at EchoPark Speedway. He scored his second win at the first race of "The Chase" at Darlington. Two weeks later, he scored his third win at Bristol night race. On October 3, 2026, Creed announced he would not return to HFT in 2027.

Dean Thompson (2027)

On August 8, 2026, it was announced that Dean Thompson will join the team in 2027. On November 5, it was revealed that Thompson will drive the No. 00.

==== Car No. 00 results ====
Year	Driver	No.	Make	1	2	3	4	5	6	7	8	9	10	11	12	13	14	15	16	17	18	19	20	21	22	23	24	25	26	27	28	29	30	31	32	33	Owners	Pts
2025	Sheldon Creed	00	Ford	DAY; 3	ATL; 14	COA; 12	PHO; 36	LVS; 10	HOM; 5	MAR; 2	DAR; 10	BRI; 37	ROC; 35	TAL; 9	TEX; 36	CLT; 10	NSS; 4	MXC; 11	POC; 36	ATL; 32	CSC; 3	SON; 10	DOV; 8	IND; 17	IOW; 7	GLN; 35	DAY; 17	PIR; 27	GTW; 30	BRI; 2	KAN; 5	ROV; 11	LVS; 11	TAL; 34	MAR; 4	PHO; 8	10th	2217
2026	Sheldon Creed	00	Chevy	DAY; 24	ATL; 1	COA; 11	PHO; 4	LVS; 3	DAR; 7	MAR; 4	ROC; 6	BRI; 6	KAN; 2	TAL; 3	TEX; 6	GLN; 29	DOV; 18	CLT; 32	NSS; 15	POC; 5	COR; 3	SON; 10	CHI; 16	ATL; 25	IND; 8	IOW; 5	DAY; 10	DAR; 1	GTW; 2	BRI; 1	LVS; 13	CLT; 3	PHO; 32	TAL; 5	MAR; 6	HOM; 6*	4th	2439

=== Car No. 41 history ===
Sam Mayer (2025–2026)

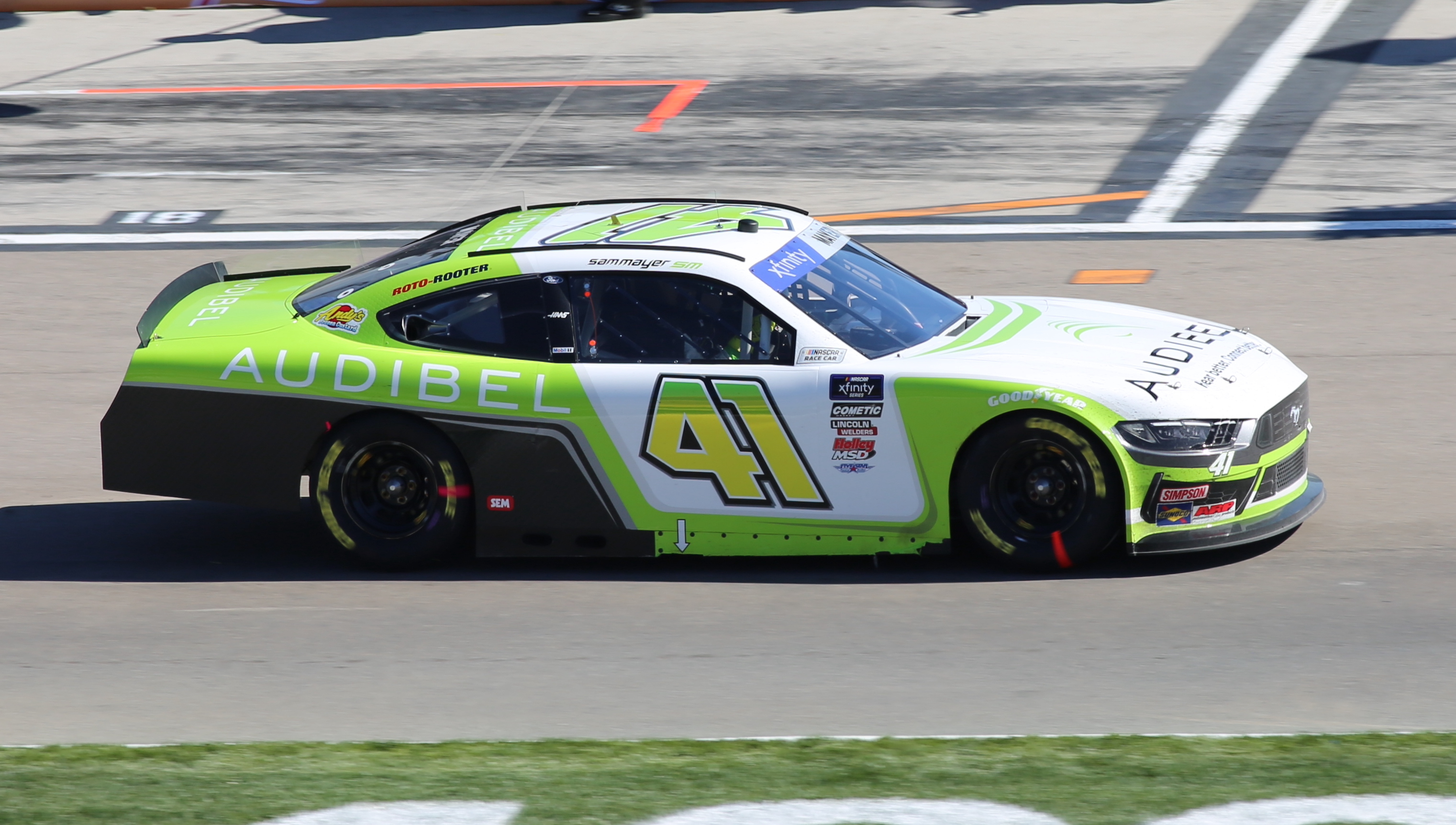
Sam Mayer in the No. 41 car at Las Vegas Motor Speedway in 2025

On August 17, 2024, Haas Factory Team announced that it signed Sam Mayer to drive the No. 41 car in 2025. Mayer started the season with a second-place finish at Daytona. After staying consistent throughout the year, he won at Iowa, earning Ford its first win that year. On October 28, 2025, it was announced that Ryan Sieg will drive the No. 41 in the season-finale at Phoenix, after Mayer was suspended one race for intentionally wrecking Jeb Burton after the checkered flag at Martinsville in the week after.

Mayer started his 2026 season with a 31st place DNF at Daytona. He won the pole at both Atlanta races and spring Las Vegas race. On September 22, 2026, Mayer announced he would not be returning to HFT in 2027.

John Hunter Nemechek (2027)

On November 4, 2026, it was announced that John Hunter Nemechek will drive the No. 41 in 2027.

==== Car No. 41 results ====
Year	Driver	No.	Make	1	2	3	4	5	6	7	8	9	10	11	12	13	14	15	16	17	18	19	20	21	22	23	24	25	26	27	28	29	30	31	32	33	Owners	Pts
2025	Sam Mayer	41	Ford	DAY; 2	ATL; 36	COA; 3	PHO; 7	LVS; 5	HOM; 2	MAR; 3	DAR; 14	BRI; 11	ROC; 26	TAL; 14	TEX; 5	CLT; 11	NSS; 3	MXC; 23	POC; 7	ATL; 3	CSC; 8	SON; 17	DOV; 12	IND; 2	IOW; 1	GLN; 2	DAY; 5	PIR; 16	GTW; 35	BRI; 3	KAN; 16	ROV; 19	LVS; 9	TAL; 38	MAR; 7		11th	2206
2025	Ryan Sieg	41	Ford																																	PHO; 37	11th	2206
2026	Sam Mayer	41	Chevy	DAY; 31	ATL; 7	COA; 14	PHO; 5	LVS; 35	DAR; 10	MAR; 23	ROC; 38	BRI; 20	KAN; 9	TAL; 24	TEX; 3	GLN; 13	DOV; 3	CLT; 36	NSS; 4	POC; 4	COR; 34	SON; 8	CHI; 8	ATL; 31	IND; 13	IOW; 21	DAY; 25	DAR; 8	GTW; 3	BRI; 7	LVS; 6	CLT; 24	PHO; 2	TAL; 13	MAR; 5	HOM; 9	6th	2377
