= 2026 FireKeepers Casino 400 =

Race details
- Race 15 of 36 in the 2026 NASCAR Cup Series
- Date: June 7, 2026
- Location: Michigan International Speedway in Brooklyn, Michigan
- Course: Permanent racing facility
- Course length: 2.0 miles (3.2 km)
- Distance: 200 laps, 400 mi (643.738 km)
- Average speed: 123.935 miles per hour (199.454 km/h)

Pole position
Driver	Denny Hamlin	Joe Gibbs Racing
- Time: 36.901

Most laps led
Driver	Chase Elliott	Hendrick Motorsports
- Laps: 67

Fastest lap
Driver	Carson Hocevar	Spire Motorsports
- Time: 37.473

Winner
No. 11	Denny Hamlin	Joe Gibbs Racing

Television in the United States
- Network: Prime Video
- Announcers: Adam Alexander, Dale Earnhardt Jr., and Steve Letarte
- Nielsen ratings: 2.07 million

Radio in the United States
- Radio: MRN
- Booth announcers: Alex Hayden, Mike Bagley and Todd Gordon
- Turn announcers: Dave Moody (1–2) and Tim Catafalmo (3–4)

The 2026 FireKeepers Casino 400 was a NASCAR Cup Series race held on June 7, 2026, at Michigan International Speedway in Brooklyn, Michigan. Contested over 200 laps on the 2-mile (3.219 km) speedway, it was the 15th race of the 2026 NASCAR Cup Series season.

Denny Hamlin won the race, tying him with Kyle Busch for 9th all-time on the NASCAR win list. Michigander Erik Jones finished 2nd, and Bubba Wallace finished 3rd. Kyle Larson and Michigander Carson Hocevar rounded out the top five, and Daniel Suárez, Joey Logano, Ryan Blaney, Chris Buescher, and Chase Briscoe rounded out the top ten.

== Report ==
=== Background ===
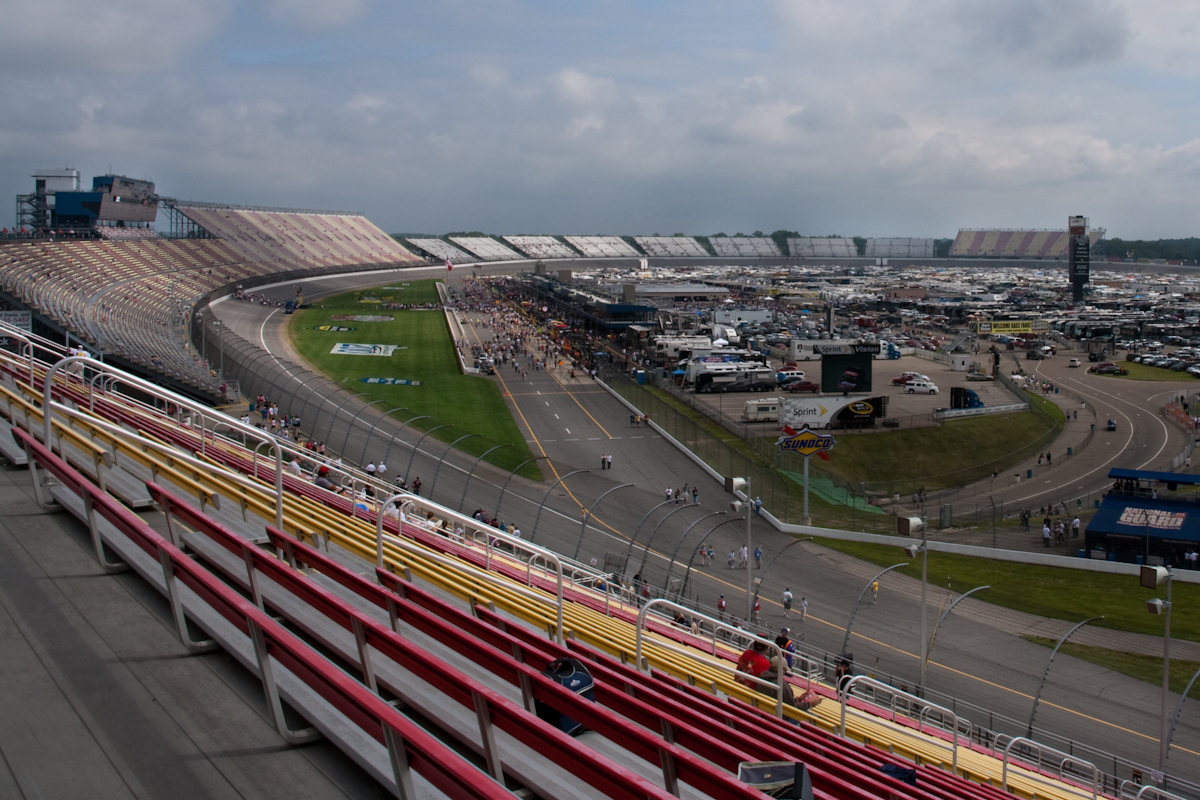
Michigan International Speedway, the track where the race was held.

The race will be held at Michigan International Speedway, a two-mile (3.2 km) moderate-banked D-shaped speedway located in Brooklyn, Michigan. The track is used primarily for NASCAR events. It is known as a "sister track" to Texas World Speedway as MIS's oval design was a direct basis of TWS, with moderate modifications to the banking in the corners, and was used as the basis of Auto Club Speedway. The track is owned by International Speedway Corporation. Michigan International Speedway is recognized as one of motorsports' premier facilities because of its wide racing surface and high banking (by open-wheel standards; the 18-degree banking is modest by stock car standards).

==== Entry list ====
- (R) denotes rookie driver.
- (i) denotes driver who is ineligible for series driver points.

No.	Driver	Team	Manufacturer
1	Ross Chastain	Trackhouse Racing	Chevrolet
2	Austin Cindric	Team Penske	Ford
3	Austin Dillon	Richard Childress Racing	Chevrolet
4	Noah Gragson	Front Row Motorsports	Ford
5	Kyle Larson	Hendrick Motorsports	Chevrolet
6	Brad Keselowski	RFK Racing	Ford
7	Daniel Suárez	Spire Motorsports	Chevrolet
9	Chase Elliott	Hendrick Motorsports	Chevrolet
10	Ty Dillon	Kaulig Racing	Chevrolet
11	Denny Hamlin	Joe Gibbs Racing	Toyota
12	Ryan Blaney	Team Penske	Ford
16	A. J. Allmendinger	Kaulig Racing	Chevrolet
17	Chris Buescher	RFK Racing	Ford
19	Chase Briscoe	Joe Gibbs Racing	Toyota
20	Christopher Bell	Joe Gibbs Racing	Toyota
21	Josh Berry	Wood Brothers Racing	Ford
22	Joey Logano	Team Penske	Ford
23	Bubba Wallace	23XI Racing	Toyota
24	William Byron	Hendrick Motorsports	Chevrolet
33	Austin Hill (i)	Richard Childress Racing	Chevrolet
34	Todd Gilliland	Front Row Motorsports	Ford
35	Riley Herbst	23XI Racing	Toyota
38	Zane Smith	Front Row Motorsports	Ford
41	Cole Custer	Haas Factory Team	Chevrolet
42	John Hunter Nemechek	Legacy Motor Club	Toyota
43	Erik Jones	Legacy Motor Club	Toyota
44	J. J. Yeley (i)	NY Racing Team	Chevrolet
45	Tyler Reddick	23XI Racing	Toyota
47	Ricky Stenhouse Jr.	Hyak Motorsports	Chevrolet
48	Alex Bowman	Hendrick Motorsports	Chevrolet
51	Cody Ware	Rick Ware Racing	Chevrolet
54	Ty Gibbs	Joe Gibbs Racing	Toyota
60	Ryan Preece	RFK Racing	Ford
71	Michael McDowell	Spire Motorsports	Chevrolet
77	Carson Hocevar	Spire Motorsports	Chevrolet
88	Connor Zilisch (R)	Trackhouse Racing	Chevrolet
97	Shane van Gisbergen	Trackhouse Racing	Chevrolet
Official entry list

== Practice ==
Tyler Reddick was the fastest in the practice session with a time of 37.379 seconds and a speed of 192.622 mph (309.995 km/h).

=== Practice results ===
Pos	No.	Driver	Team	Manufacturer	Time	Speed
1	45	Tyler Reddick	23XI Racing	Toyota	37.379	192.622
2	9	Chase Elliott	Hendrick Motorsports	Chevrolet	37.461	191.200
3	5	Kyle Larson	Hendrick Motorsports	Chevrolet	37.617	191.403
Official practice results

== Qualifying ==
Denny Hamlin scored the pole for the race with a time of 36.901 and a speed of 195.117 mph (314.010 km/h). Despite winning the pole, Hamlin was ordered to start from the rear due to unapproved adjustments from underbody damage after cutting a tire in practice.

=== Qualifying results ===
Pos	No.	Driver	Team	Manufacturer	Time	Speed
1	11	Denny Hamlin	Joe Gibbs Racing	Toyota	36.901	195.117
2	77	Carson Hocevar	Spire Motorsports	Chevrolet	36.919	195.022
3	45	Tyler Reddick	23XI Racing	Toyota	36.929	194.969
4	54	Ty Gibbs	Joe Gibbs Racing	Toyota	36.953	194.842
5	19	Chase Briscoe	Joe Gibbs Racing	Toyota	36.956	194.826
6	9	Chase Elliott	Hendrick Motorsports	Chevrolet	36.958	194.816
7	5	Kyle Larson	Hendrick Motorsports	Chevrolet	36.967	194.768
8	20	Christopher Bell	Joe Gibbs Racing	Toyota	37.003	194.579
9	24	William Byron	Hendrick Motorsports	Chevrolet	37.038	194.395
10	43	Erik Jones	Legacy Motor Club	Toyota	37.090	194.122
11	7	Daniel Suárez	Spire Motorsports	Chevrolet	37.121	193.960
12	35	Riley Herbst	23XI Racing	Toyota	37.127	193.929
13	23	Bubba Wallace	23XI Racing	Toyota	37.133	193.898
14	17	Chris Buescher	RFK Racing	Ford	37.186	193.621
15	41	Cole Custer	Haas Factory Team	Chevrolet	37.205	193.522
16	38	Zane Smith	Front Row Motorsports	Ford	37.213	193.481
17	42	John Hunter Nemechek	Legacy Motor Club	Toyota	37.240	193.340
18	22	Joey Logano	Team Penske	Ford	37.257	193.252
19	12	Ryan Blaney	Team Penske	Ford	37.258	193.247
20	71	Michael McDowell	Spire Motorsports	Chevrolet	37.277	193.149
21	3	Austin Dillon	Richard Childress Racing	Chevrolet	37.277	193.149
22	4	Noah Gragson	Front Row Motorsports	Ford	37.341	192.818
23	47	Ricky Stenhouse Jr.	Hyak Motorsports	Chevrolet	37.342	192.812
24	10	Ty Dillon	Kaulig Racing	Chevrolet	37.408	192.472
25	16	A. J. Allmendinger	Kaulig Racing	Chevrolet	37.457	192.220
26	6	Brad Keselowski	RFK Racing	Ford	37.476	192.123
27	60	Ryan Preece	RFK Racing	Ford	37.551	191.739
28	33	Austin Hill (i)	Richard Childress Racing	Chevrolet	37.553	191.729
29	48	Alex Bowman	Hendrick Motorsports	Chevrolet	37.561	191.688
30	97	Shane van Gisbergen	Trackhouse Racing	Chevrolet	37.562	191.683
31	2	Austin Cindric	Team Penske	Ford	37.667	191.149
32	1	Ross Chastain	Trackhouse Racing	Chevrolet	37.690	191.032
33	51	Cody Ware	Rick Ware Racing	Ford	37.715	190.905
34	88	Connor Zilisch (R)	Trackhouse Racing	Chevrolet	37.720	190.880
35	34	Todd Gilliland	Front Row Motorsports	Ford	37.730	190.830
36	44	J. J. Yeley (i)	NY Racing Team	Chevrolet	38.570	186.674
37	21	Josh Berry	Wood Brothers Racing	Ford	0.000	0.000
Official qualifying results

== Race ==
=== Race results ===
==== Stage results ====
Stage One Laps: 45

Pos	No	Driver	Team	Manufacturer	Points
1	45	Tyler Reddick	23XI Racing	Toyota	10
2	54	Ty Gibbs	Joe Gibbs Racing	Toyota	9
3	77	Carson Hocevar	Spire Motorsports	Chevrolet	8
4	9	Chase Elliott	Hendrick Motorsports	Chevrolet	7
5	23	Bubba Wallace	23XI Racing	Toyota	6
6	38	Zane Smith	Front Row Motorsports	Ford	5
7	5	Kyle Larson	Hendrick Motorsports	Chevrolet	4
8	17	Chris Buescher	RFK Racing	Ford	3
9	35	Riley Herbst	23XI Racing	Toyota	2
10	7	Daniel Suárez	Spire Motorsports	Chevrolet	1

Stage Two Laps: 75

Pos	No	Driver	Team	Manufacturer	Points
1	9	Chase Elliott	Hendrick Motorsports	Chevrolet	10
2	43	Erik Jones	Legacy Motor Club	Toyota	9
3	7	Daniel Suárez	Spire Motorsports	Chevrolet	8
4	5	Kyle Larson	Hendrick Motorsports	Chevrolet	7
5	24	William Byron	Hendrick Motorsports	Chevrolet	6
6	20	Christopher Bell	Joe Gibbs Racing	Toyota	5
7	77	Carson Hocevar	Spire Motorsports	Chevrolet	4
8	11	Denny Hamlin	Joe Gibbs Racing	Toyota	3
9	22	Joey Logano	Team Penske	Ford	2
10	38	Zane Smith	Front Row Motorsports	Ford	1

=== Final Stage results ===
Stage Three Laps: 80

Pos	Grid	No	Driver	Team	Manufacturer	Laps	Points
1	1	11	Denny Hamlin	Joe Gibbs Racing	Toyota	200	58
2	10	43	Erik Jones	Legacy Motor Club	Toyota	200	44
3	13	23	Bubba Wallace	23XI Racing	Toyota	200	40
4	7	5	Kyle Larson	Hendrick Motorsports	Chevrolet	200	44
5	2	77	Carson Hocevar	Spire Motorsports	Chevrolet	200	45
6	11	7	Daniel Suárez	Spire Motorsports	Chevrolet	200	40
7	18	22	Joey Logano	Team Penske	Ford	200	32
8	19	12	Ryan Blaney	Team Penske	Ford	200	29
9	14	17	Chris Buescher	RFK Racing	Ford	200	31
10	5	19	Chase Briscoe	Joe Gibbs Racing	Toyota	200	27
11	31	2	Austin Cindric	Team Penske	Ford	200	26
12	15	41	Cole Custer	Haas Factory Team	Chevrolet	200	25
13	12	35	Riley Herbst	23XI Racing	Toyota	200	26
14	17	42	John Hunter Nemechek	Legacy Motor Club	Toyota	200	23
15	37	21	Josh Berry	Wood Brothers Racing	Ford	200	22
16	32	1	Ross Chastain	Trackhouse Racing	Chevrolet	200	21
17	25	16	A. J. Allmendinger	Kaulig Racing	Chevrolet	200	20
18	9	24	William Byron	Hendrick Motorsports	Chevrolet	200	25
19	29	48	Alex Bowman	Hendrick Motorsports	Chevrolet	200	18
20	28	33	Austin Hill (i)	Richard Childress Racing	Chevrolet	200	0
21	36	44	J. J. Yeley (i)	NY Racing Team	Chevrolet	199	0
22	35	34	Todd Gilliland	Front Row Motorsports	Ford	199	15
23	33	51	Cody Ware	Rick Ware Racing	Ford	198	14
24	24	10	Ty Dillon	Kaulig Racing	Chevrolet	196	13
25	4	54	Ty Gibbs	Joe Gibbs Racing	Toyota	187	21
26	20	71	Michael McDowell	Spire Motorsports	Chevrolet	158	11
27	22	4	Noah Gragson	Front Row Motorsports	Ford	156	10
28	27	60	Ryan Preece	RFK Racing	Ford	155	9
29	23	47	Ricky Stenhouse Jr.	Hyak Motorsports	Chevrolet	154	8
30	30	97	Shane van Gisbergen	Trackhouse Racing	Chevrolet	154	7
31	8	20	Christopher Bell	Joe Gibbs Racing	Toyota	147	11
32	6	9	Chase Elliott	Hendrick Motorsports	Chevrolet	147	22
33	16	38	Zane Smith	Front Row Motorsports	Ford	141	10
34	26	6	Brad Keselowski	RFK Racing	Ford	89	3
35	3	45	Tyler Reddick	23XI Racing	Toyota	83	12
36	21	3	Austin Dillon	Richard Childress Racing	Chevrolet	82	1
37	34	88	Connor Zilisch (R)	Trackhouse Racing	Chevrolet	8	1
Official race results

=== Race statistics ===
- Lead changes: 23 among 11 different drivers
- Cautions/Laps: 11 for 54
- Red flags: 1 for 20 minutes and 31 seconds
- Time of race: 3 hours, 13 minutes, and 39 seconds
- Average speed: 123.935 miles per hour (199.454 km/h)

== Media ==
=== Television ===
Prime Video covered the race on the television side. Adam Alexander, Dale Earnhardt Jr. and Steve Letarte called the race from the broadcast booth. Kim Coon, Marty Snider, and Trevor Bayne handled pit road for the television side.

Prime Video
Booth announcers	Pit reporters
Lap-by-lap: Adam Alexander; Color-commentator: Dale Earnhardt Jr. Color-commentator: Steve Letarte	Kim Coon; Marty Snider; Trevor Bayne

=== Radio ===
Radio coverage of the race was broadcast by the Motor Racing Network (MRN) and wias also simulcasted on Sirius XM NASCAR Radio. Alex Hayden, Mike Bagley and former championship Crew Chief Todd Gordon called the race in the booth when the field races through the quad-oval. Lead MRN Turn Announcer Dave Moody called the race from a billboard in turn 2 when the field will race through turns 1 and 2 and halfway down the backstretch. Tim Catafalmo called the race from a billboard outside of turn 3 when the field will race through the other half of the backstretch and through turns 3 and 4. Lead MRN Radio Pit Reporter Steve Post, Jacklyn Drake and Jason Toy were the pit reporters during the broadcast.

MRN Radio
Booth announcers	Turn announcers	Pit reporters
Lead announcer: Alex Hayden; Announcer: Mike Bagley; Announcer: Todd Gordon	Turns 1 & 2: Dave Moody; Turns 3 & 4: Tim Catafalmo	Steve Post; Jacklyn Drake; Jason Toy

== Standings after the race ==
Drivers' Championship standings

	Pos	Driver	Points
	1	Tyler Reddick	669
	2	Denny Hamlin	618 (–51)
	3	Ryan Blaney	512 (–157)
	4	Chase Elliott	482 (–187)
	5	Ty Gibbs	470 (–199)
	6	Kyle Larson	453 (–216)
2	7	Carson Hocevar	428 (–241)
	8	Chris Buescher	424 (–245)
1	9	Daniel Suárez	418 (–251)
3	10	Christopher Bell	410 (–259)
4	11	Bubba Wallace	378 (–291)
1	12	William Byron	377 (–292)
1	13	Chase Briscoe	370 (–299)
2	14	Shane van Gisbergen	355 (–314)
2	15	Brad Keselowski	350 (–319)
	16	Austin Cindric	332 (–337)
Official driver's standings

Manufacturers' Championship standings

Pos	Manufacturer	Points
1	Toyota	692
2	Chevrolet	616 (–76)
3	Ford	498 (–194)

- Note: Only the first 16 positions are included for the driver standings.

Previous race: 2026 Cracker Barrel 400	NASCAR Cup Series; 2026 season	Next race: 2026 The Great American Getaway 400
