= 2025 Cracker Barrel 400 =

NASCAR Cup Series race

Race details
- Race 14 of 36 in the 2025 NASCAR Cup Series
- Date: June 1, 2025
- Location: Nashville Superspeedway in Lebanon, Tennessee
- Course: Permanent racing facility
- Course length: 1.333 miles (2.145 km)
- Distance: 300 laps, 400 mi (640 km)
- Average speed: 129.068 miles per hour (207.715 km/h)

Pole position
Driver	Chase Briscoe	Joe Gibbs Racing
- Time: 29.125

Most laps led
Driver	Ryan Blaney	Team Penske
- Laps: 139

Fastest lap
Driver	Denny Hamlin	Joe Gibbs Racing
- Time: 29.663

Winner
No. 12	Ryan Blaney	Team Penske

Television in the United States
- Network: Prime Video
- Announcers: Adam Alexander, Dale Earnhardt Jr., and Steve Letarte

Radio in the United States
- Radio: PRN
- Booth announcers: Brad Gillie and Mark Garrow
- Turn announcers: Rob Albright (1 & 2) and Pat Patterson (3 & 4)

The 2025 Cracker Barrel 400 was a NASCAR Cup Series race held on June 1, 2025, at Nashville Superspeedway in Lebanon, Tennessee. Contested over 300 laps on the 1 1/3-mile (2.146 km) speedway, it was the 14th race of the 2025 NASCAR Cup Series season.

Ryan Blaney won the race. Carson Hocevar finished 2nd, and Denny Hamlin finished 3rd. Joey Logano and William Byron rounded out the top five, and Bubba Wallace, Erik Jones, Kyle Larson, Tyler Reddick, and Christopher Bell rounded out the top ten.

== Report ==
=== Background ===
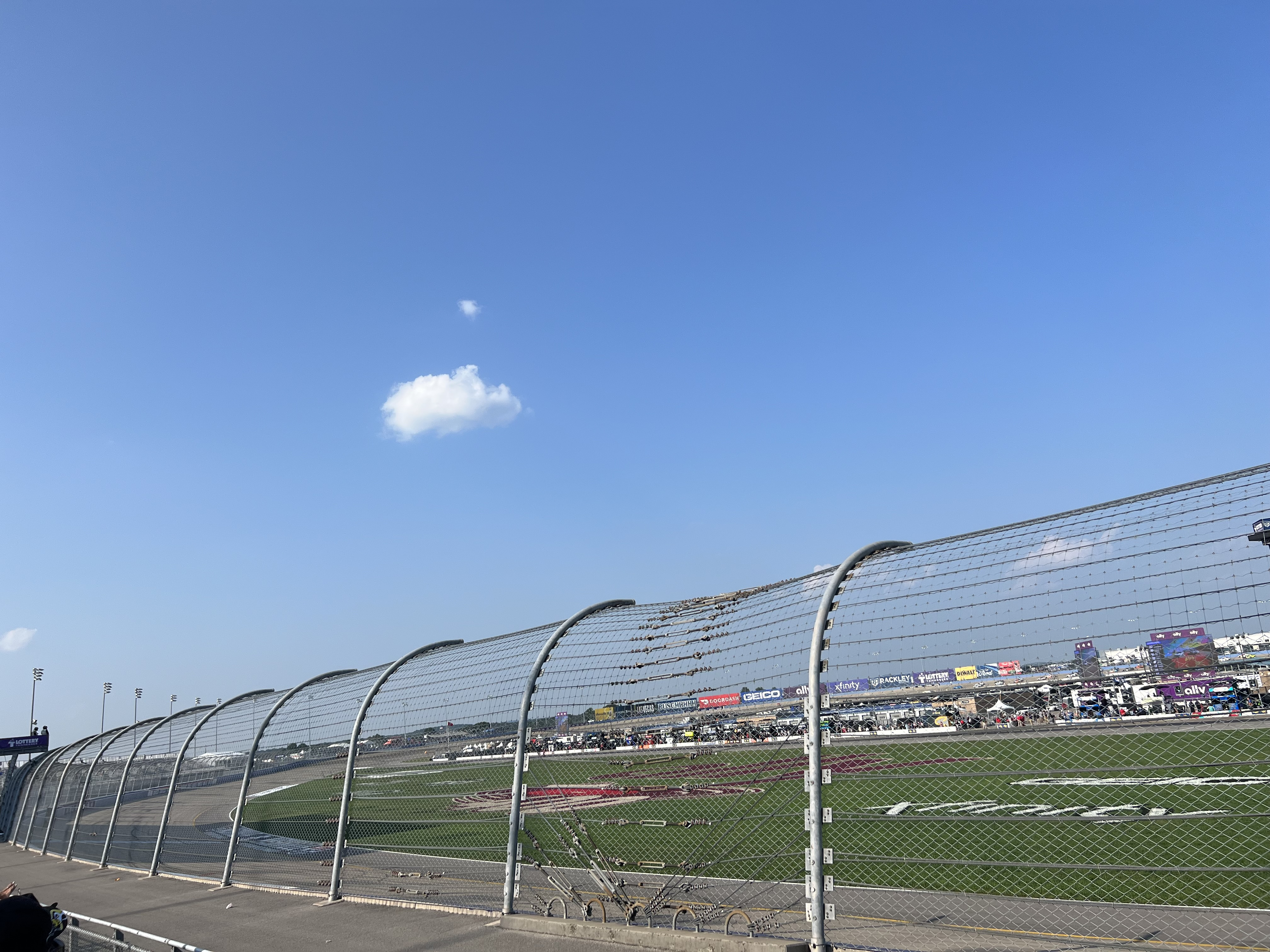
Nashville Superspeedway, where the race was held.

Nashville Superspeedway is a motor racing complex located in Lebanon, Tennessee, United States, about 30 miles (48 km) southeast of Nashville. The track was built in 2001 and is currently used for events, driving schools and GT Academy, a reality television competition.

It is a concrete oval track 1 1/3 miles (2.146 km) long. Nashville Superspeedway is owned by Dover Motorsports, Inc., which also owns Dover International Speedway. Nashville Superspeedway was the longest concrete oval in NASCAR during the time it was on the NASCAR Xfinity Series and NASCAR Craftsman Truck Series circuits. Current permanent seating capacity is approximately 25,000. Additional portable seats are brought in for some events, and seating capacity can be expanded to 150,000. Infrastructure is in place to expand the facility to include a short track, drag strip, and road course.

==== Entry list ====
- (R) denotes rookie driver.
- (i) denotes driver who is ineligible for series driver points.

No.	Driver	Team	Manufacturer
1	Ross Chastain	Trackhouse Racing	Chevrolet
2	Austin Cindric	Team Penske	Ford
3	Austin Dillon	Richard Childress Racing	Chevrolet
4	Noah Gragson	Front Row Motorsports	Ford
5	Kyle Larson	Hendrick Motorsports	Chevrolet
6	Brad Keselowski	RFK Racing	Ford
7	Justin Haley	Spire Motorsports	Chevrolet
8	Kyle Busch	Richard Childress Racing	Chevrolet
9	Chase Elliott	Hendrick Motorsports	Chevrolet
10	Ty Dillon	Kaulig Racing	Chevrolet
11	Denny Hamlin	Joe Gibbs Racing	Toyota
12	Ryan Blaney	Team Penske	Ford
16	A. J. Allmendinger	Kaulig Racing	Chevrolet
17	Chris Buescher	RFK Racing	Ford
19	Chase Briscoe	Joe Gibbs Racing	Toyota
20	Christopher Bell	Joe Gibbs Racing	Toyota
21	Josh Berry	Wood Brothers Racing	Ford
22	Joey Logano	Team Penske	Ford
23	Bubba Wallace	23XI Racing	Toyota
24	William Byron	Hendrick Motorsports	Chevrolet
34	Todd Gilliland	Front Row Motorsports	Ford
35	Riley Herbst (R)	23XI Racing	Toyota
38	Zane Smith	Front Row Motorsports	Ford
41	Cole Custer	Haas Factory Team	Ford
42	John Hunter Nemechek	Legacy Motor Club	Toyota
43	Erik Jones	Legacy Motor Club	Toyota
44	J. J. Yeley (i)	NY Racing Team	Chevrolet
45	Tyler Reddick	23XI Racing	Toyota
47	Ricky Stenhouse Jr.	Hyak Motorsports	Chevrolet
48	Alex Bowman	Hendrick Motorsports	Chevrolet
51	Cody Ware	Rick Ware Racing	Ford
54	Ty Gibbs	Joe Gibbs Racing	Toyota
60	Ryan Preece	RFK Racing	Ford
66	Chad Finchum	Garage 66	Ford
67	Corey Heim (i)	23XI Racing	Toyota
71	Michael McDowell	Spire Motorsports	Chevrolet
77	Carson Hocevar	Spire Motorsports	Chevrolet
88	Shane van Gisbergen (R)	Trackhouse Racing	Chevrolet
99	Daniel Suárez	Trackhouse Racing	Chevrolet
Official entry list

== Practice ==
Tyler Reddick was the fastest in the practice session with a time of 29.677 seconds and a speed of 161.337 mph (259.647 km/h).

=== Practice results ===
Pos	No.	Driver	Team	Manufacturer	Time	Speed
1	45	Tyler Reddick	23XI Racing	Toyota	29.677	161.337
2	11	Denny Hamlin	Joe Gibbs Racing	Toyota	29.738	161.006
3	9	Chase Elliott	Hendrick Motorsports	Chevrolet	29.772	160.822
Official practice results

== Qualifying ==
Chase Briscoe scored the pole for the race with a time of 29.125 and a speed of 164.395 mph (264.568 km/h).

=== Qualifying results ===
Pos	No.	Driver	Team	Manufacturer	Time	Speed
1	19	Chase Briscoe	Joe Gibbs Racing	Toyota	29.125	164.395
2	11	Denny Hamlin	Joe Gibbs Racing	Toyota	29.174	164.119
3	24	William Byron	Hendrick Motorsports	Chevrolet	29.307	163.374
4	45	Tyler Reddick	23XI Racing	Toyota	29.308	163.368
5	1	Ross Chastain	Trackhouse Racing	Chevrolet	29.310	163.357
6	6	Brad Keselowski	RFK Racing	Ford	29.377	162.985
7	20	Christopher Bell	Joe Gibbs Racing	Toyota	29.387	162.929
8	71	Michael McDowell	Spire Motorsports	Chevrolet	29.397	162.874
9	22	Joey Logano	Team Penske	Ford	29.434	162.669
10	17	Chris Buescher	RFK Racing	Ford	29.443	162.619
11	9	Chase Elliott	Hendrick Motorsports	Chevrolet	29.477	162.432
12	23	Bubba Wallace	23XI Racing	Toyota	29.526	162.162
13	47	Ricky Stenhouse Jr.	Hyak Motorsports	Chevrolet	29.588	161.822
14	43	Erik Jones	Legacy Motor Club	Toyota	29.589	161.817
15	12	Ryan Blaney	Team Penske	Ford	29.601	161.751
16	2	Austin Cindric	Team Penske	Ford	29.606	161.724
17	16	A. J. Allmendinger	Kaulig Racing	Chevrolet	29.619	161.653
18	7	Justin Haley	Spire Motorsports	Chevrolet	29.623	161.631
19	60	Ryan Preece	RFK Racing	Ford	29.635	161.566
20	21	Josh Berry	Wood Brothers Racing	Ford	29.651	161.479
21	3	Austin Dillon	Richard Childress Racing	Chevrolet	29.657	161.446
22	54	Ty Gibbs	Joe Gibbs Racing	Toyota	29.658	161.440
23	88	Shane van Gisbergen (R)	Trackhouse Racing	Chevrolet	29.659	161.435
24	48	Alex Bowman	Hendrick Motorsports	Chevrolet	29.670	161.375
25	8	Kyle Busch	Richard Childress Racing	Chevrolet	29.732	161.039
26	77	Carson Hocevar	Spire Motorsports	Chevrolet	29.754	160.920
27	38	Zane Smith	Front Row Motorsports	Ford	29.766	160.855
28	5	Kyle Larson	Hendrick Motorsports	Chevrolet	29.778	160.790
29	41	Cole Custer	Haas Factory Team	Ford	29.807	160.633
30	4	Noah Gragson	Front Row Motorsports	Ford	29.820	160.563
31	10	Ty Dillon	Kaulig Racing	Chevrolet	29.824	160.542
32	99	Daniel Suárez	Trackhouse Racing	Chevrolet	29.884	160.220
33	67	Corey Heim (i)	23XI Racing	Toyota	29.896	160.155
34	51	Cody Ware	Rick Ware Racing	Ford	29.951	159.861
35	34	Todd Gilliland	Front Row Motorsports	Ford	29.996	159.621
36	42	John Hunter Nemechek	Legacy Motor Club	Toyota	30.023	159.478
37	35	Riley Herbst (R)	23XI Racing	Toyota	30.160	158.753
38	44	J. J. Yeley (i)	NY Racing Team	Chevrolet	30.443	157.278
39	66	Chad Finchum	Garage 66	Ford	31.729	150.903
Official qualifying results

== Race ==
=== Race results ===
==== Stage results ====
Stage One Laps: 90

Pos	No	Driver	Team	Manufacturer	Points
1	11	Denny Hamlin	Joe Gibbs Racing	Toyota	10
2	45	Tyler Reddick	23XI Racing	Toyota	9
3	19	Chase Briscoe	Joe Gibbs Racing	Toyota	8
4	24	William Byron	Hendrick Motorsports	Chevrolet	7
5	20	Christopher Bell	Joe Gibbs Racing	Toyota	6
6	9	Chase Elliott	Hendrick Motorsports	Chevrolet	5
7	12	Ryan Blaney	Team Penske	Ford	4
8	71	Michael McDowell	Spire Motorsports	Chevrolet	3
9	22	Joey Logano	Team Penske	Ford	2
10	1	Ross Chastain	Trackhouse Racing	Chevrolet	1
Official stage one results

Stage Two Laps: 95

Pos	No	Driver	Team	Manufacturer	Points
1	12	Ryan Blaney	Team Penske	Ford	10
2	24	William Byron	Hendrick Motorsports	Chevrolet	9
3	11	Denny Hamlin	Joe Gibbs Racing	Toyota	8
4	22	Joey Logano	Team Penske	Ford	7
5	43	Erik Jones	Legacy Motor Club	Toyota	6
6	2	Austin Cindric	Team Penske	Ford	5
7	77	Carson Hocevar	Spire Motorsports	Chevrolet	4
8	38	Zane Smith	Front Row Motorsports	Ford	3
9	21	Josh Berry	Wood Brothers Racing	Ford	2
10	20	Christopher Bell	Joe Gibbs Racing	Toyota	1
Official stage two results

=== Final Stage results ===
Stage Three Laps: 115

Pos	Grid	No	Driver	Team	Manufacturer	Laps	Points
1	15	12	Ryan Blaney	Team Penske	Ford	300	54
2	26	77	Carson Hocevar	Spire Motorsports	Chevrolet	300	39
3	2	11	Denny Hamlin	Joe Gibbs Racing	Toyota	300	53
4	9	22	Joey Logano	Team Penske	Ford	300	42
5	3	24	William Byron	Hendrick Motorsports	Chevrolet	300	48
6	12	23	Bubba Wallace	23XI Racing	Toyota	300	31
7	14	43	Erik Jones	Legacy Motor Club	Toyota	300	36
8	28	5	Kyle Larson	Hendrick Motorsports	Chevrolet	300	29
9	4	45	Tyler Reddick	23XI Racing	Toyota	300	37
10	7	20	Christopher Bell	Joe Gibbs Racing	Toyota	300	34
11	5	1	Ross Chastain	Trackhouse Racing	Chevrolet	300	27
12	25	8	Kyle Busch	Richard Childress Racing	Chevrolet	300	25
13	27	38	Zane Smith	Front Row Motorsports	Ford	300	27
14	10	17	Chris Buescher	RFK Racing	Ford	300	23
15	11	9	Chase Elliott	Hendrick Motorsports	Chevrolet	300	27
16	32	99	Daniel Suárez	Trackhouse Racing	Chevrolet	300	21
17	1	19	Chase Briscoe	Joe Gibbs Racing	Toyota	300	28
18	16	2	Austin Cindric	Team Penske	Ford	300	24
19	29	41	Cole Custer	Haas Factory Team	Ford	300	18
20	17	16	A. J. Allmendinger	Kaulig Racing	Chevrolet	300	17
21	8	71	Michael McDowell	Spire Motorsports	Chevrolet	300	19
22	35	34	Todd Gilliland	Front Row Motorsports	Ford	300	15
23	6	6	Brad Keselowski	RFK Racing	Ford	300	14
24	37	35	Riley Herbst (R)	23XI Racing	Toyota	300	13
25	23	88	Shane van Gisbergen (R)	Trackhouse Racing	Chevrolet	300	12
26	31	10	Ty Dillon	Kaulig Racing	Chevrolet	299	11
27	36	42	John Hunter Nemechek	Legacy Motor Club	Toyota	299	10
28	19	60	Ryan Preece	RFK Racing	Ford	299	9
29	21	3	Austin Dillon	Richard Childress Racing	Chevrolet	299	8
30	20	21	Josh Berry	Wood Brothers Racing	Ford	299	9
31	22	54	Ty Gibbs	Joe Gibbs Racing	Toyota	299	6
32	18	7	Justin Haley	Spire Motorsports	Chevrolet	299	5
33	34	51	Cody Ware	Rick Ware Racing	Ford	297	4
34	38	44	J. J. Yeley (i)	NY Racing Team	Chevrolet	297	0
35	39	66	Chad Finchum	Garage 66	Ford	288	2
36	24	48	Alex Bowman	Hendrick Motorsports	Chevrolet	188	1
37	33	67	Corey Heim (i)	23XI Racing	Toyota	129	0
38	30	4	Noah Gragson	Front Row Motorsports	Ford	112	1
39	13	47	Ricky Stenhouse Jr.	Hyak Motorsports	Chevrolet	110	1
Official race results

=== Race statistics ===
- Lead changes: 18 among 9 different drivers
- Cautions/Laps: 7 for 35
- Red flags: 0
- Time of race: 3 hours, 5 minutes, and 29 seconds
- Average speed: 129.068 miles per hour (207.715 km/h)

== Media ==
=== Television ===
Prime Video covered the race on the television side. Adam Alexander, Dale Earnhardt Jr. and Steve Letarte called the race from the broadcast booth. Kim Coon, Marty Snider, and Trevor Bayne handled pit road for the television side.

Prime Video
Booth announcers	Pit reporters
Lap-by-lap: Adam Alexander; Color-commentator: Dale Earnhardt Jr. Color-commentator: Steve Letarte	Kim Coon; Marty Snider; Trevor Bayne

=== Radio ===
Radio coverage of the race was broadcast by the Performance Racing Network (PRN), and was also simulcasted on Sirius XM NASCAR Radio. Brad Gillie and Mark Garrow called the race in the booth when the field races through the quad-oval. Rob Albright called the race from a billboard in turn 2 when the field would race through turns 1 and 2 and halfway down the backstretch. Pat Patterson called the race from a billboard outside of turn 3 when the field would race through the other half of the backstretch and through turns 3 and 4. Wendy Venturini, Heather Debeaux, and Alan Cavanna were the pit reporters during the broadcast.

PRN Radio
Booth announcers	Turn announcers	Pit reporters
Lead announcer: Brad Gillie; Announcer: Mark Garrow	Turns 1 & 2: Rob Albright; Turns 3 & 4: Pat Patterson	Wendy Venturini; Heather DeBeaux; Alan Cavanna

== Standings after the race ==
Drivers' Championship standings

	Pos	Driver	Points
	1	William Byron	547
	2	Kyle Larson	499 (–48)
	3	Christopher Bell	459 (–88)
2	4	Denny Hamlin	442 (–105)
1	5	Chase Elliott	442 (–105)
1	6	Tyler Reddick	429 (–118)
	7	Ryan Blaney	417 (–130)
1	8	Joey Logano	380 (–167)
1	9	Ross Chastain	377 (–170)
2	10	Bubba Wallace	343 (–204)
	11	Chase Briscoe	342 (–205)
2	12	Alex Bowman	334 (–213)
2	13	Austin Cindric	303 (–244)
2	14	Chris Buescher	297 (–250)
4	15	Kyle Busch	291 (–256)
2	16	Ryan Preece	289 (–258)
Official driver's standings

Manufacturers' Championship standings

Pos	Manufacturer	Points
1	Chevrolet	512
2	Toyota	492 (–19)
3	Ford	477 (–35)

- Note: Only the first 16 positions are included for the driver standings.
- . – Driver has clinched a position in the NASCAR Cup Series playoffs.

Previous race: 2025 Coca-Cola 600	NASCAR Cup Series; 2025 season	Next race: 2025 FireKeepers Casino 400
