= 2026 DuraMAX Texas Grand Prix =

NASCAR Cup Series race

2026 DuraMAX Texas Grand Prix Powered by RelaDyne
Race details
- Race 3 of 36 in the 2026 NASCAR Cup Series
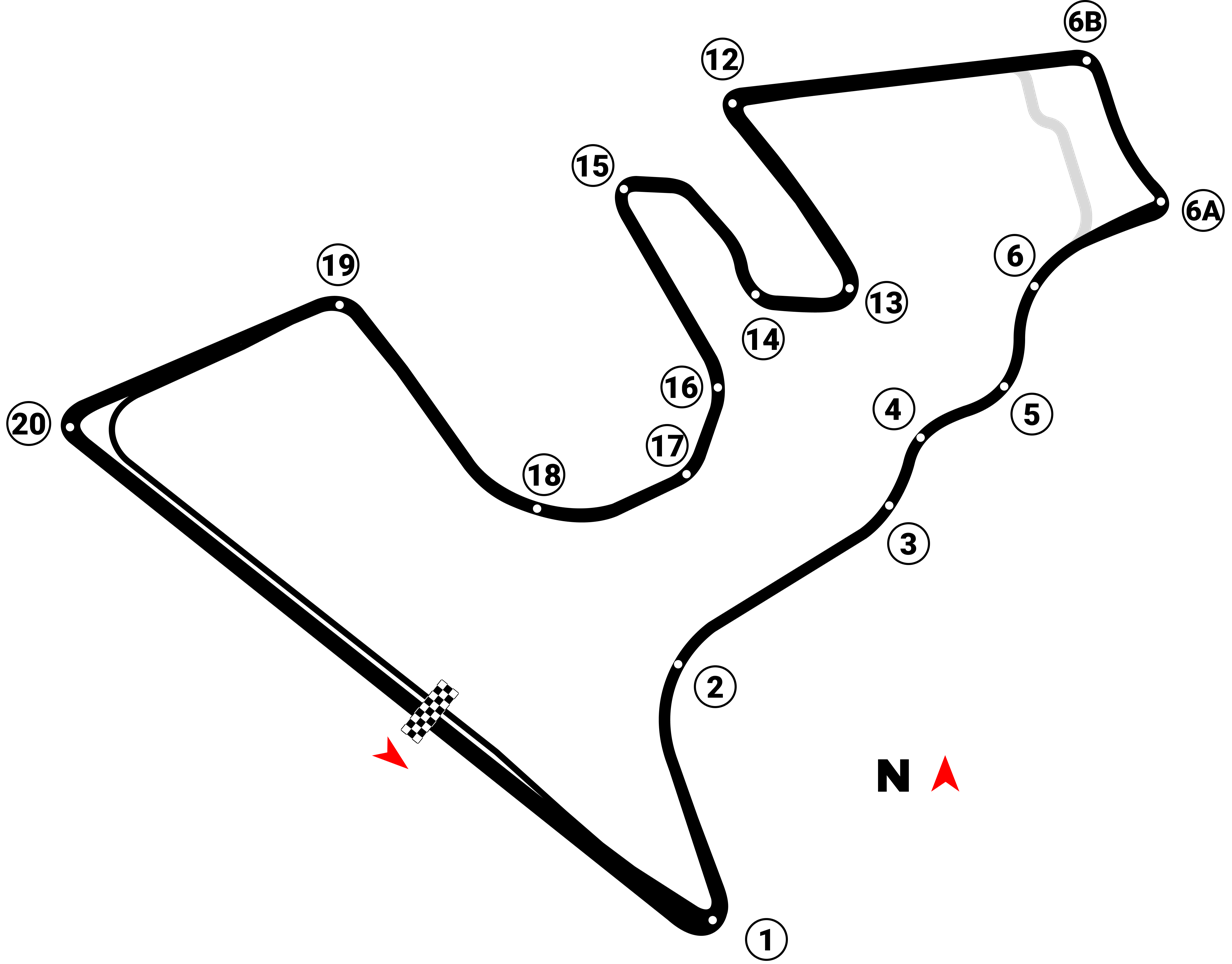
- Date: March 1, 2026
- Location: Circuit of the Americas in Austin, Texas
- Course: Permanent racing facility
- Course length: 2.400 miles (3.862 km)
- Distance: 95 laps, 228 mi (367 km)
- Weather: Sunny with a temperature around 81 °F (27 °C); wind out of the southeast at 20 miles per hour (32 km/h).
- Average speed: 76.474 miles per hour (123.073 km/h)

Pole position
Driver	Tyler Reddick	23XI Racing
- Time: 1:37.760

Most laps led
Driver	Tyler Reddick	23XI Racing
- Laps: 58

Fastest lap
Driver	Ross Chastain	Trackhouse Racing
- Time: 1:39.680

Winner
No. 45	Tyler Reddick	23XI Racing

Television in the United States
- Network: Fox
- Announcers: Mike Joy, Clint Bowyer, and Kevin Harvick
- Nielsen ratings: 2.06 (3.933 million)

Radio in the United States
- Radio: PRN
- Booth announcers: Brad Gillie and Nick Yeoman
- Turn announcers: Andrew Kurland (Turn 1), Doug Turnbull (Turns 2–6A), Kyle Rickey (Turns 6B–15), and Pat Patterson (Turns 16–20)

The 2026 DuraMAX Texas Grand Prix Powered by RelaDyne was a NASCAR Cup Series race held on March 1, 2026, at Circuit of the Americas in Austin, Texas. Contested over 95 laps on the 2.400 mi (3.862 km) road course, it was the third race of the 2026 NASCAR Cup Series season.

Tyler Reddick won the race. Shane van Gisbergen finished 2nd, and Christopher Bell finished 3rd. Ty Gibbs and Michael McDowell rounded out the top five, and Kyle Larson, Chase Elliott, Ryan Blaney, A. J. Allmendinger, and Denny Hamlin rounded out the top ten.

== Report ==
=== Background ===
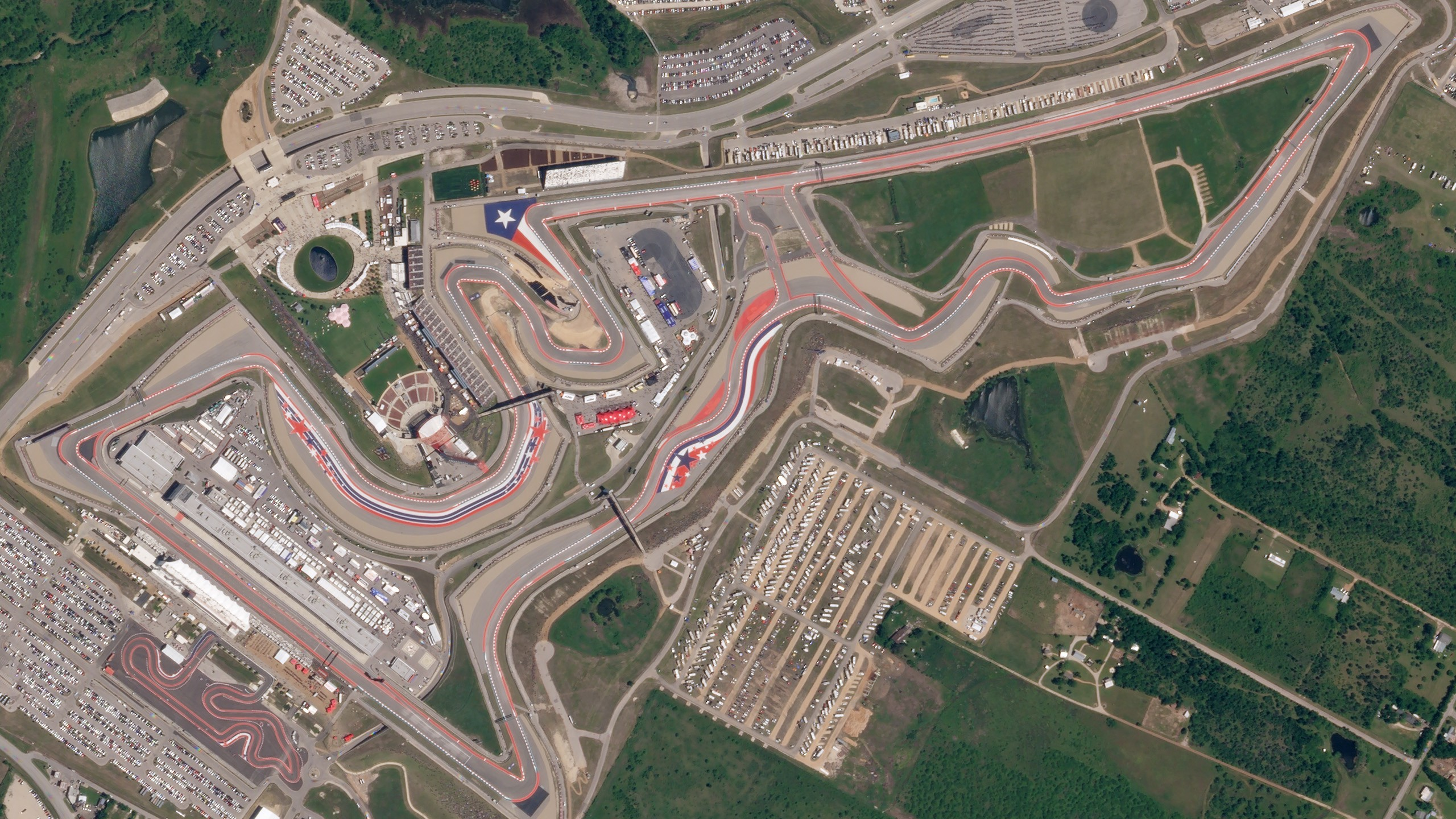
Aerial view of Circuit of the Americas, the track where the race was held.

Circuit of the Americas (COTA) is a grade 1 FIA-specification motorsports facility located within the extraterritorial jurisdiction of Austin, Texas. It features a 3.426-mile (5.514 km) road racing circuit. The facility is home to the Formula One United States Grand Prix, and the Motorcycle Grand Prix of the Americas, a round of the FIM Road Racing World Championship. It previously hosted the Supercars Championship, the FIA World Endurance Championship, the IMSA SportsCar Championship, and IndyCar Series.

On November 20, 2024, it was announced that the race would move to the 2.400 mi (3.862 km) layout.

On January 8, 2026, DuraMAX was announced as the title sponsor, replacing EchoPark Automotive.

==== Entry list ====
- (R) denotes rookie driver.
- (i) denotes driver who is ineligible for series driver points.

No.	Driver	Team	Manufacturer
1	Ross Chastain	Trackhouse Racing	Chevrolet
2	Austin Cindric	Team Penske	Ford
3	Austin Dillon	Richard Childress Racing	Chevrolet
4	Noah Gragson	Front Row Motorsports	Ford
5	Kyle Larson	Hendrick Motorsports	Chevrolet
6	Brad Keselowski	RFK Racing	Ford
7	Daniel Suárez	Spire Motorsports	Chevrolet
8	Kyle Busch	Richard Childress Racing	Chevrolet
9	Chase Elliott	Hendrick Motorsports	Chevrolet
10	Ty Dillon	Kaulig Racing	Chevrolet
11	Denny Hamlin	Joe Gibbs Racing	Toyota
12	Ryan Blaney	Team Penske	Ford
16	A. J. Allmendinger	Kaulig Racing	Chevrolet
17	Chris Buescher	RFK Racing	Ford
19	Chase Briscoe	Joe Gibbs Racing	Toyota
20	Christopher Bell	Joe Gibbs Racing	Toyota
21	Josh Berry	Wood Brothers Racing	Ford
22	Joey Logano	Team Penske	Ford
23	Bubba Wallace	23XI Racing	Toyota
24	William Byron	Hendrick Motorsports	Chevrolet
33	Jesse Love (i)	Richard Childress Racing	Chevrolet
34	Todd Gilliland	Front Row Motorsports	Ford
35	Riley Herbst	23XI Racing	Toyota
38	Zane Smith	Front Row Motorsports	Ford
41	Cole Custer	Haas Factory Team	Chevrolet
42	John Hunter Nemechek	Legacy Motor Club	Toyota
43	Erik Jones	Legacy Motor Club	Toyota
45	Tyler Reddick	23XI Racing	Toyota
47	Ricky Stenhouse Jr.	Hyak Motorsports	Chevrolet
48	Alex Bowman	Hendrick Motorsports	Chevrolet
51	Cody Ware	Rick Ware Racing	Chevrolet
54	Ty Gibbs	Joe Gibbs Racing	Toyota
60	Ryan Preece	RFK Racing	Ford
71	Michael McDowell	Spire Motorsports	Chevrolet
77	Carson Hocevar	Spire Motorsports	Chevrolet
88	Connor Zilisch (R)	Trackhouse Racing	Chevrolet
97	Shane van Gisbergen	Trackhouse Racing	Chevrolet
Official entry list

== Practice ==
Michael McDowell was the fastest in the practice session with a time of 99.023 seconds and a speed of 87.253 mph (140.420 km/h).

=== Practice results ===
Pos	No.	Driver	Team	Manufacturer	Time	Speed
1	71	Michael McDowell	Spire Motorsports	Chevrolet	99.023	87.253
2	12	Ryan Blaney	Team Penske	Ford	99.091	87.193
3	88	Connor Zilisch (R)	Trackhouse Racing	Chevrolet	99.253	87.050
Official practice results

== Qualifying ==
Tyler Reddick scored the pole for the race with a time of 1:37.760 and a speed of 88.380 mph (142.234 km/h).

=== Qualifying results ===
Pos	No.	Driver	Team	Manufacturer	Time	Speed
1	45	Tyler Reddick	23XI Racing	Toyota	1:37.760	88.380
2	1	Ross Chastain	Trackhouse Racing	Chevrolet	1:37.897	88.256
3	19	Chase Briscoe	Joe Gibbs Racing	Toyota	1:37.913	88.242
4	12	Ryan Blaney	Team Penske	Ford	1:37.982	88.179
5	9	Chase Elliott	Hendrick Motorsports	Chevrolet	1:38.002	88.161
6	71	Michael McDowell	Spire Motorsports	Chevrolet	1:38.147	88.031
7	16	A. J. Allmendinger	Kaulig Racing	Chevrolet	1:38.152	88.027
8	20	Christopher Bell	Joe Gibbs Racing	Toyota	1:38.204	87.980
9	54	Ty Gibbs	Joe Gibbs Racing	Toyota	1:38.259	87.931
10	24	William Byron	Hendrick Motorsports	Chevrolet	1:38.381	87.822
11	38	Zane Smith	Front Row Motorsports	Ford	1:38.408	87.798
12	77	Carson Hocevar	Spire Motorsports	Chevrolet	1:38.463	87.749
13	97	Shane van Gisbergen	Trackhouse Racing	Chevrolet	1:38.464	87.748
14	17	Chris Buescher	RFK Racing	Ford	1:38.497	87.718
15	5	Kyle Larson	Hendrick Motorsports	Chevrolet	1:38.514	87.703
16	48	Alex Bowman	Hendrick Motorsports	Chevrolet	1:38.542	87.678
17	34	Todd Gilliland	Front Row Motorsports	Ford	1:38.562	87.661
18	41	Cole Custer	Haas Factory Team	Chevrolet	1:38.602	87.625
19	11	Denny Hamlin	Joe Gibbs Racing	Toyota	1:38.617	87.612
20	22	Joey Logano	Team Penske	Ford	1:38.675	87.560
21	10	Ty Dillon	Kaulig Racing	Chevrolet	1:38.772	87.474
22	21	Josh Berry	Wood Brothers Racing	Ford	1:38.807	87.443
23	7	Daniel Suárez	Spire Motorsports	Chevrolet	1:38.836	87.418
24	23	Bubba Wallace	23XI Racing	Toyota	1:38.829	87.416
25	88	Connor Zilisch (R)	Trackhouse Racing	Chevrolet	1:38.895	87.365
26	6	Brad Keselowski	RFK Racing	Ford	1:38.917	87.346
27	33	Jesse Love (i)	Richard Childress Racing	Chevrolet	1:38.996	87.276
28	2	Austin Cindric	Team Penske	Ford	1:39.009	87.265
29	60	Ryan Preece	RFK Racing	Ford	1:39.082	87.201
30	8	Kyle Busch	Richard Childress Racing	Chevrolet	1:39.160	87.132
31	42	John Hunter Nemechek	Legacy Motor Club	Toyota	1:39.274	87.032
32	35	Riley Herbst	23XI Racing	Toyota	1:39.433	86.893
33	3	Austin Dillon	Richard Childress Racing	Chevrolet	1:39.757	86.610
34	47	Ricky Stenhouse Jr.	Hyak Motorsports	Chevrolet	1:39.781	86.590
35	4	Noah Gragson	Front Row Motorsports	Ford	1:39.858	86.523
36	43	Erik Jones	Legacy Motor Club	Toyota	1:39.942	86.450
37	51	Cody Ware	Rick Ware Racing	Chevrolet	1:40.064	86.345
Official qualifying results

== Race ==
=== Race results ===
==== Stage Results ====
Stage One Laps: 20

Pos	No	Driver	Team	Manufacturer	Points
1	1	Ross Chastain	Trackhouse Racing	Chevrolet	10
2	97	Shane van Gisbergen	Trackhouse Racing	Chevrolet	9
3	71	Michael McDowell	Spire Motorsports	Chevrolet	8
4	17	Chris Buescher	RFK Racing	Ford	7
5	16	A. J. Allmendinger	Kaulig Racing	Chevrolet	6
6	54	Ty Gibbs	Joe Gibbs Racing	Toyota	5
7	48	Alex Bowman	Hendrick Motorsports	Chevrolet	4
8	9	Chase Elliott	Hendrick Motorsports	Chevrolet	3
9	77	Carson Hocevar	Spire Motorsports	Chevrolet	2
10	11	Denny Hamlin	Joe Gibbs Racing	Toyota	1

Stage Two Laps: 25

Pos	No	Driver	Team	Manufacturer	Points
1	54	Ty Gibbs	Joe Gibbs Racing	Toyota	10
2	16	A. J. Allmendinger	Kaulig Racing	Chevrolet	9
3	7	Daniel Suárez	Spire Motorsports	Chevrolet	8
4	34	Todd Gilliland	Front Row Motorsports	Ford	7
5	45	Tyler Reddick	23XI Racing	Toyota	6
6	23	Bubba Wallace	23XI Racing	Toyota	5
7	12	Ryan Blaney	Team Penske	Ford	4
8	41	Cole Custer	Haas Factory Team	Chevrolet	3
9	24	William Byron	Hendrick Motorsports	Chevrolet	2
10	97	Shane van Gisbergen	Trackhouse Racing	Chevrolet	1

=== Final Stage Results ===
Stage Three Laps: 50

Pos	Grid	No	Driver	Team	Manufacturer	Laps	Points
1	1	45	Tyler Reddick	23XI Racing	Toyota	95	61
2	13	97	Shane van Gisbergen	Trackhouse Racing	Chevrolet	95	45
3	8	20	Christopher Bell	Joe Gibbs Racing	Toyota	95	34
4	9	54	Ty Gibbs	Joe Gibbs Racing	Toyota	95	48
5	6	71	Michael McDowell	Spire Motorsports	Chevrolet	95	40
6	15	5	Kyle Larson	Hendrick Motorsports	Chevrolet	95	31
7	5	9	Chase Elliott	Hendrick Motorsports	Chevrolet	95	33
8	4	12	Ryan Blaney	Team Penske	Ford	95	33
9	7	16	A. J. Allmendinger	Kaulig Racing	Chevrolet	95	43
10	19	11	Denny Hamlin	Joe Gibbs Racing	Toyota	95	28
11	24	23	Bubba Wallace	23XI Racing	Toyota	95	31
12	30	8	Kyle Busch	Richard Childress Racing	Chevrolet	95	25
13	10	24	William Byron	Hendrick Motorsports	Chevrolet	95	26
14	25	88	Connor Zilisch (R)	Trackhouse Racing	Chevrolet	95	23
15	20	22	Joey Logano	Team Penske	Ford	95	22
16	21	10	Ty Dillon	Kaulig Racing	Chevrolet	95	21
17	31	42	John Hunter Nemechek	Legacy Motor Club	Toyota	95	20
18	29	60	Ryan Preece	RFK Racing	Ford	95	19
19	33	3	Austin Dillon	Richard Childress Racing	Chevrolet	95	18
20	26	6	Brad Keselowski	RFK Racing	Ford	95	17
21	17	34	Todd Gilliland	Front Row Motorsports	Ford	95	23
22	35	4	Noah Gragson	Front Row Motorsports	Ford	95	15
23	32	35	Riley Herbst	23XI Racing	Toyota	95	14
24	14	17	Chris Buescher	RFK Racing	Ford	95	20
25	23	7	Daniel Suárez	Spire Motorsports	Chevrolet	95	20
26	22	21	Josh Berry	Wood Brothers Racing	Ford	95	11
27	27	33	Jesse Love (i)	Richard Childress Racing	Chevrolet	95	0
28	34	47	Ricky Stenhouse Jr.	Hyak Motorsports	Chevrolet	95	9
29	18	41	Cole Custer	Haas Factory Team	Chevrolet	95	11
30	37	51	Cody Ware	Rick Ware Racing	Ford	95	7
31	12	77	Carson Hocevar	Spire Motorsports	Chevrolet	95	8
32	28	2	Austin Cindric	Team Penske	Ford	95	5
33	11	38	Zane Smith	Front Row Motorsports	Ford	95	4
34	36	43	Erik Jones	Legacy Motor Club	Toyota	93	3
35	2	1	Ross Chastain	Trackhouse Racing	Chevrolet	93	13
36	16	48	Alex Bowman (Note: Bowman fell ill late in the race and was relieved by Myatt Snider. Since Bowman started the race, he is credited with a 36th place finish.)	Hendrick Motorsports	Chevrolet	89	5
37	3	19	Chase Briscoe	Joe Gibbs Racing	Toyota	62	1
Official race results

=== Race statistics ===
- Lead changes: 14 among 9 different drivers
- Cautions/Laps: 3 for 10
- Red flags: 0
- Time of race: 2 hours, 58 minutes and 53 seconds
- Average speed: 76.474 miles per hour (123.073 km/h)

== Media ==
=== Television ===
Fox Sports covered the race on the television side. Mike Joy, Clint Bowyer, and Kevin Harvick called the race from the broadcast booth. Jamie Little, Regan Smith, and Josh Sims handled pit road for the television side, and Larry McReynolds provided insight on-site during the race.

Fox
Booth announcers	Pit reporters	In-race analyst
Lap-by-lap: Mike Joy; Color-commentator: Clint Bowyer; Color-commentator: Kevin Harvick	Jamie Little; Regan Smith; Josh Sims	Larry McReynolds

=== Radio ===
PRN had the radio call for the race which was also simulcasted on Sirius XM NASCAR Radio.

PRN
Booth announcers	Turn announcers	Pit reporters
Lead announcer: Brad Gillie; Announcer: Nick Yeoman	Turn 1: Andrew Kurland; Turns 2–6A: Doug Turnbull; Turns 6B–15: Kyle Rickey; Turns 16–20: Pat Patterson	Wendy Venturini; Brett McMillan; Heather Debeaux

== Standings after the race ==
Drivers' Championship standings

	Pos	Driver	Points
	1	Tyler Reddick	186
	2	Bubba Wallace	116 (–70)
	3	Chase Elliott	114 (–72)
4	4	Ryan Blaney	100 (–86)
11	5	Shane van Gisbergen	90 (–96)
	6	Joey Logano	90 (–96)
	7	Daniel Suárez	87 (–99)
10	8	A. J. Allmendinger	86 (–100)
11	9	Michael McDowell	83 (–103)
6	10	Carson Hocevar	82 (–104)
1	11	Chris Buescher	81 (–105)
3	12	Brad Keselowski	78 (–108)
	13	William Byron	76 (–110)
9	14	Zane Smith	75 (–111)
6	15	Kyle Larson	73 (–113)
2	16	Ryan Preece	68 (–118)
Official driver's standings

Manufacturers' Championship standings

Pos	Manufacturer	Points
1	Toyota	165
2	Chevrolet	104 (–61)
3	Ford	93 (–72)

- Note: Only the first 16 positions are included for the driver standings.

== See also ==
- Focused Health 250 (O'Reilly Auto Parts Series)
- 2026 OnlyBulls Green Flag 150 (Craftsman Truck Series)

== Notes ==
Previous race: 2026 Autotrader 400	NASCAR Cup Series; 2026 season	Next race: 2026 Straight Talk Wireless 500
