= 2025 SciAps 300 =

9th race of the 2025 NASCAR Xfinity Series

Race details
- Race 9 of 33 of the 2025 NASCAR Xfinity Series
- Date: April 12, 2025
- Location: Bristol Motor Speedway in Bristol, Tennessee
- Course: Permanent racing facility
- Course length: 0.533 miles (0.858 km)
- Distance: 300 laps, 160 mi (257 km)
- Scheduled distance: 300 laps, 160 mi (257 km)
- Average speed: 85.584 mph (137.734 km/h)

Pole position
Driver	Kyle Larson	Hendrick Motorsports
- Time: 15.194

Most laps led
Driver	Kyle Larson	Hendrick Motorsports
- Laps: 277

Winner
No. 17	Kyle Larson	Hendrick Motorsports

Television in the United States
- Network: The CW
- Announcers: Adam Alexander, Jamie McMurray, and Parker Kligerman

Radio in the United States
- Radio: PRN

The 2025 SciAps 300 was the 9th stock car race of the 2025 NASCAR Xfinity Series, and the first iteration of the event. The race was held on Saturday, April 12, 2025, at Bristol Motor Speedway in Bristol, Tennessee, a 0.533 miles (0.858 km) permanent oval shaped racetrack. The race took the scheduled 300 laps to complete.

Kyle Larson, driving for Hendrick Motorsports, would put on a trailblazing performance, winning the pole, the second stage, and led a race-high 277 laps to earn his 16th career NASCAR Xfinity Series win, and his second of the season. To fill out the podium, Carson Kvapil and Justin Allgaier, both driving for JR Motorsports, would finish 2nd and 3rd, respectively.

This was also the third race of the Dash 4 Cash. Drivers eligible for the D4C were Austin Hill, Sheldon Creed, Justin Allgaier, and Brennan Poole, since they were the highest finishing Xfinity regulars following the race at Martinsville. Allgaier finished in third and claimed the $100K bonus cash.

== Report ==
=== Background ===
Bristol Motor Speedway, the track where the race was held.

Bristol Motor Speedway, formerly known as Bristol International Raceway and Bristol Raceway, is a NASCAR short track venue located in Bristol, Tennessee. Constructed in 1960, it held its first NASCAR race on July 30, 1961. Bristol is among the most popular tracks on the NASCAR schedule because of its distinct features, which include extraordinarily steep banking combined with short length, an all concrete surface, two pit roads, and stadium-like seating.

In 2021, the race shifted to a dirt surface version of the track and was renamed the Food City Dirt Race. After the 2023 event, the race would return to being run on concrete to replace the dirt surface.

==== Entry list ====
- (R) denotes rookie driver.
- (i) denotes driver who is ineligible for series driver points.

#	Driver	Team	Make
00	Sheldon Creed	Haas Factory Team	Ford
1	Carson Kvapil (R)	JR Motorsports	Chevrolet
2	Jesse Love	Richard Childress Racing	Chevrolet
4	Parker Retzlaff	Alpha Prime Racing	Chevrolet
5	Kris Wright	Our Motorsports	Chevrolet
07	Alex Labbé	SS-Green Light Racing	Chevrolet
7	Justin Allgaier	JR Motorsports	Chevrolet
8	Sammy Smith	JR Motorsports	Chevrolet
10	Daniel Dye (R)	Kaulig Racing	Chevrolet
11	Josh Williams	Kaulig Racing	Chevrolet
14	Garrett Smithley	SS-Green Light Racing	Chevrolet
16	Christian Eckes (R)	Kaulig Racing	Chevrolet
17	Kyle Larson (i)	Hendrick Motorsports	Chevrolet
18	William Sawalich (R)	Joe Gibbs Racing	Toyota
19	Justin Bonsignore	Joe Gibbs Racing	Toyota
20	Brandon Jones	Joe Gibbs Racing	Toyota
21	Austin Hill	Richard Childress Racing	Chevrolet
24	Corey Heim (i)	Sam Hunt Racing	Toyota
25	Harrison Burton	AM Racing	Ford
26	Dean Thompson (R)	Sam Hunt Racing	Toyota
27	Jeb Burton	Jordan Anderson Racing	Chevrolet
28	Kyle Sieg	RSS Racing	Ford
31	Blaine Perkins	Jordan Anderson Racing	Chevrolet
35	Greg Van Alst	Joey Gase Motorsports	Chevrolet
39	Ryan Sieg	RSS Racing	Ford
41	Sam Mayer	Haas Factory Team	Ford
42	Anthony Alfredo	Young's Motorsports	Chevrolet
44	Brennan Poole	Alpha Prime Racing	Chevrolet
45	Mason Massey	Alpha Prime Racing	Chevrolet
48	Nick Sanchez (R)	Big Machine Racing	Chevrolet
51	Jeremy Clements	Jeremy Clements Racing	Chevrolet
53	Mason Maggio	Joey Gase Motorsports	Chevrolet
54	Taylor Gray (R)	Joe Gibbs Racing	Toyota
66	Tyler Tomassi	MBM Motorsports	Ford
70	Thomas Annunziata	Cope Family Racing	Chevrolet
71	Ryan Ellis	DGM Racing	Chevrolet
88	Connor Zilisch (R)	JR Motorsports	Chevrolet
91	C. J. McLaughlin	DGM Racing	Chevrolet
99	Matt DiBenedetto	Viking Motorsports	Chevrolet
Official entry list

== Practice ==
For practice, drivers were separated into two groups, A and B. Both sessions were 25 minutes long, and was held on Saturday, April 12, at 11:35 AM EST. Nick Sanchez, driving for Big Machine Racing, would set the fastest time between both sessions, with a lap of 15.677, and a speed of 122.396 mph (196.977 km/h).

Pos.	#	Driver	Team	Make	Time	Speed
1	48	Nick Sanchez (R)	Big Machine Racing	Chevrolet	15.677	122.396
2	54	Taylor Gray (R)	Joe Gibbs Racing	Toyota	15.688	122.310
3	7	Justin Allgaier	JR Motorsports	Chevrolet	15.695	122.255
Full practice results

== Qualifying ==
Qualifying was held on Saturday, April 12, at 12:40 PM EST. Since Bristol Motor Speedway is a short track, the qualifying system used is a single-car, two-lap system with one round. Drivers will be on track by themselves and will have two laps to post a qualifying time, and whoever sets the fastest time will win the pole.

Kyle Larson, driving for Hendrick Motorsports, would score the pole for the race, with a lap of 15.194, and a speed of 126.287 mph (203.239 km/h).

Tyler Tomassi was the only driver who failed to qualify.

=== Qualifying results ===
Pos.	#	Driver	Team	Make	Time	Speed
1	17	Kyle Larson (i)	Hendrick Motorsports	Chevrolet	15.194	126.287
2	88	Connor Zilisch (R)	JR Motorsports	Chevrolet	15.272	125.642
3	1	Carson Kvapil (R)	JR Motorsports	Chevrolet	15.306	125.363
4	7	Justin Allgaier	JR Motorsports	Chevrolet	15.369	124.849
5	39	Ryan Sieg	RSS Racing	Ford	15.401	124.589
6	41	Sam Mayer	Haas Factory Team	Ford	15.402	124.581
7	48	Nick Sanchez (R)	Big Machine Racing	Chevrolet	15.410	124.517
8	8	Sammy Smith	JR Motorsports	Chevrolet	15.417	124.460
9	4	Parker Retzlaff	Alpha Prime Racing	Chevrolet	15.418	124.452
10	25	Harrison Burton	AM Racing	Ford	15.428	124.371
11	54	Taylor Gray (R)	Joe Gibbs Racing	Toyota	15.439	124.283
12	27	Jeb Burton	Jordan Anderson Racing	Chevrolet	15.440	124.275
13	2	Jesse Love	Richard Childress Racing	Chevrolet	15.456	124.146
14	20	Brandon Jones	Joe Gibbs Racing	Toyota	15.464	124.082
15	18	William Sawalich (R)	Joe Gibbs Racing	Toyota	15.465	124.074
16	24	Corey Heim (i)	Sam Hunt Racing	Toyota	15.487	123.897
17	26	Dean Thompson (R)	Sam Hunt Racing	Toyota	15.490	123.873
18	21	Austin Hill	Richard Childress Racing	Chevrolet	15.510	123.714
19	10	Daniel Dye (R)	Kaulig Racing	Chevrolet	15.567	123.261
20	28	Kyle Sieg	RSS Racing	Ford	15.598	123.016
21	00	Sheldon Creed	Haas Factory Team	Ford	15.606	122.953
22	16	Christian Eckes (R)	Kaulig Racing	Chevrolet	15.606	122.953
23	44	Brennan Poole	Alpha Prime Racing	Chevrolet	15.606	122.953
24	51	Jeremy Clements	Jeremy Clements Racing	Chevrolet	15.616	122.874
25	99	Matt DiBenedetto	Viking Motorsports	Chevrolet	15.691	122.287
26	11	Josh Williams	Kaulig Racing	Chevrolet	15.709	122.147
27	19	Justin Bonsignore	Joe Gibbs Racing	Toyota	15.714	122.108
28	31	Blaine Perkins	Jordan Anderson Racing	Chevrolet	15.719	122.069
29	42	Anthony Alfredo	Young's Motorsports	Chevrolet	15.781	121.589
30	45	Mason Massey	Alpha Prime Racing	Chevrolet	15.799	121.451
31	5	Kris Wright	Our Motorsports	Chevrolet	15.864	120.953
32	71	Ryan Ellis	DGM Racing	Chevrolet	15.909	120.611
Qualified by owner's points
33	70	Thomas Annunziata	Cope Family Racing	Chevrolet	15.987	120.023
34	14	Garrett Smithley	SS-Green Light Racing	Chevrolet	16.071	119.395
35	07	Alex Labbé	SS-Green Light Racing	Chevrolet	16.129	118.966
36	35	Greg Van Alst	Joey Gase Motorsports	Chevrolet	16.155	118.774
37	91	C. J. McLaughlin	DGM Racing	Chevrolet	16.831	114.004
38	53	Mason Maggio	Joey Gase Motorsports	Chevrolet	–	–
Failed to qualify
39	66	Tyler Tomassi	MBM Motorsports	Ford	–	–
Official qualifying results
Official starting lineup

== Race results ==
Stage 1 Laps: 85

Pos.	#	Driver	Team	Make	Pts
1	41	Sam Mayer	Haas Factory Team	Ford	10
2	39	Ryan Sieg	RSS Racing	Ford	9
3	17	Kyle Larson (i)	Hendrick Motorsports	Chevrolet	0
4	8	Sammy Smith	JR Motorsports	Chevrolet	7
5	7	Justin Allgaier	JR Motorsports	Chevrolet	6
6	88	Connor Zilisch (R)	JR Motorsports	Chevrolet	5
7	48	Nick Sanchez (R)	Big Machine Racing	Chevrolet	4
8	2	Jesse Love	Richard Childress Racing	Chevrolet	3
9	1	Carson Kvapil (R)	JR Motorsports	Chevrolet	2
10	20	Brandon Jones	Joe Gibbs Racing	Toyota	1

Stage 2 Laps: 85

Pos.	#	Driver	Team	Make	Pts
1	17	Kyle Larson (i)	Hendrick Motorsports	Chevrolet	0
2	7	Justin Allgaier	JR Motorsports	Chevrolet	9
3	8	Sammy Smith	JR Motorsports	Chevrolet	8
4	1	Carson Kvapil (R)	JR Motorsports	Chevrolet	7
5	88	Connor Zilisch (R)	JR Motorsports	Chevrolet	6
6	2	Jesse Love	Richard Childress Racing	Chevrolet	5
7	20	Brandon Jones	Joe Gibbs Racing	Toyota	4
8	24	Corey Heim (i)	Sam Hunt Racing	Toyota	0
9	18	William Sawalich (R)	Joe Gibbs Racing	Toyota	2
10	41	Sam Mayer	Haas Factory Team	Ford	1

Stage 3 Laps: 130

Fin	St	#	Driver	Team	Make	Laps	Led	Status	Pts
1	1	17	Kyle Larson (i)	Hendrick Motorsports	Chevrolet	300	277	Running	0
2	3	1	Carson Kvapil (R)	JR Motorsports	Chevrolet	300	0	Running	44
3	4	7	Justin Allgaier	JR Motorsports	Chevrolet	300	9	Running	49
4	8	8	Sammy Smith	JR Motorsports	Chevrolet	300	2	Running	48
5	14	20	Brandon Jones	Joe Gibbs Racing	Toyota	300	0	Running	37
6	13	2	Jesse Love	Richard Childress Racing	Chevrolet	300	0	Running	39
7	5	39	Ryan Sieg	RSS Racing	Ford	300	1	Running	39
8	16	24	Corey Heim (i)	Sam Hunt Racing	Toyota	300	0	Running	0
9	22	16	Christian Eckes (R)	Kaulig Racing	Chevrolet	300	0	Running	28
10	17	26	Dean Thompson (R)	Sam Hunt Racing	Toyota	300	0	Running	27
11	6	41	Sam Mayer	Haas Factory Team	Ford	300	12	Running	37
12	2	88	Connor Zilisch (R)	JR Motorsports	Chevrolet	300	0	Running	36
13	19	10	Daniel Dye (R)	Kaulig Racing	Chevrolet	299	0	Running	24
14	26	11	Josh Williams	Kaulig Racing	Chevrolet	299	0	Running	23
15	29	42	Anthony Alfredo	Young's Motorsports	Chevrolet	299	0	Running	22
16	7	48	Nick Sanchez (R)	Big Machine Racing	Chevrolet	299	0	Running	25
17	27	19	Justin Bonsignore	Joe Gibbs Racing	Toyota	298	0	Running	20
18	9	4	Parker Retzlaff	Alpha Prime Racing	Chevrolet	298	0	Running	19
19	11	54	Taylor Gray (R)	Joe Gibbs Racing	Toyota	298	0	Running	18
20	24	51	Jeremy Clements	Jeremy Clements Racing	Chevrolet	298	0	Running	17
21	12	27	Jeb Burton	Jordan Anderson Racing	Chevrolet	298	0	Running	16
22	20	28	Kyle Sieg	RSS Racing	Ford	298	0	Running	15
23	25	99	Matt DiBenedetto	Viking Motorsports	Chevrolet	298	0	Running	14
24	18	21	Austin Hill	Richard Childress Racing	Chevrolet	298	0	Running	13
25	30	45	Mason Massey	Alpha Prime Racing	Chevrolet	297	0	Running	12
26	10	25	Harrison Burton	AM Racing	Ford	296	0	Running	11
27	32	71	Ryan Ellis	DGM Racing	Chevrolet	295	0	Running	10
28	33	70	Thomas Annunziata	Cope Family Racing	Chevrolet	294	0	Running	9
29	34	14	Garrett Smithley	SS-Green Light Racing	Chevrolet	294	0	Running	8
30	28	31	Blaine Perkins	Jordan Anderson Racing	Chevrolet	294	0	Running	7
31	31	5	Kris Wright	Our Motorsports	Chevrolet	293	0	Running	6
32	36	35	Greg Van Alst	Joey Gase Motorsports	Chevrolet	290	0	Running	5
33	37	91	C. J. McLaughlin	DGM Racing	Chevrolet	289	0	Running	4
34	15	18	William Sawalich (R)	Joe Gibbs Racing	Toyota	211	0	Accident	5
35	35	07	Alex Labbé	SS-Green Light Racing	Chevrolet	141	0	Power	2
36	23	44	Brennan Poole	Alpha Prime Racing	Chevrolet	74	0	Accident	1
37	21	00	Sheldon Creed	Haas Factory Team	Ford	73	0	Accident	1
38	38	53	Mason Maggio	Joey Gase Motorsports	Chevrolet	2	0	Accident	1
Official race results

== Standings after the race ==
Drivers' Championship standings

	Pos	Driver	Points
	1	Justin Allgaier	395
	2	Sam Mayer	312 (–83)
2	3	Jesse Love	286 (–109)
1	4	Austin Hill	280 (–115)
1	5	Connor Zilisch	260 (–135)
2	6	Carson Kvapil	257 (–138)
	7	Brandon Jones	253 (–142)
4	8	Sheldon Creed	252 (–143)
	9	Ryan Sieg	249 (–146)
1	10	Sammy Smith	241 (–154)
2	11	Daniel Dye	212 (–183)
2	12	Harrison Burton	209 (–186)
Official driver's standings

Manufacturers' Championship standings

Pos	Manufacturer	Points
1	Chevrolet	350
2	Toyota	304 (–46)
3	Ford	288 (–62)

- Note: Only the first 12 positions are included for the driver standings.

Previous race: 2025 Sport Clips Haircuts VFW 200	NASCAR Xfinity Series; 2025 season	Next race: 2025 North Carolina Education Lottery 250
