= 2025 Hy-Vee PERKS 250 =

22nd race of the 2025 NASCAR Xfinity Series

Race details
- Race 22 of 33 of the 2025 NASCAR Xfinity Series
- Date: August 2, 2025
- Location: Iowa Speedway in Newton, Iowa
- Course: Permanent racing facility
- Course length: 0.875 miles (1.408 km)
- Distance: 250 laps, 218 mi (352 km)
- Scheduled distance: 250 laps, 218 mi (352 km)
- Average speed: 87.832 mph (141.352 km/h)

Pole position
Driver	Jesse Love	Richard Childress Racing
- Time: 23.642

Most laps led
Driver	Ross Chastain	JR Motorsports
- Laps: 120

Winner
No. 41	Sam Mayer	Haas Factory Team

Television in the United States
- Network: The CW
- Announcers: Adam Alexander and Jamie McMurray

Radio in the United States
- Radio: MRN

The 2025 Hy-Vee PERKS 250 was the 22nd stock car race of the 2025 NASCAR Xfinity Series, and the 11th iteration of the event. The race was held on Saturday, August 2, 2025, at Iowa Speedway in Newton, Iowa, a 0.875 miles (1.408 km) permanent asphalt tri-oval shaped racetrack. The race took the scheduled 250 laps to complete.

In a wild race, Sam Mayer, driving for Haas Factory Team, would take the lead from Jesse Love on a late restart, and led the final 28 laps to earn his eighth career NASCAR Xfinity Series win, his first of the season, and his second consecutive win at Iowa. This was also the first win for Haas Factory Team in the Xfinity Series. To fill out the podium, Love, driving for Richard Childress Racing, and Ross Chastain, driving for JR Motorsports, would finish 2nd and 3rd, respectively.

== Report ==
=== Background ===
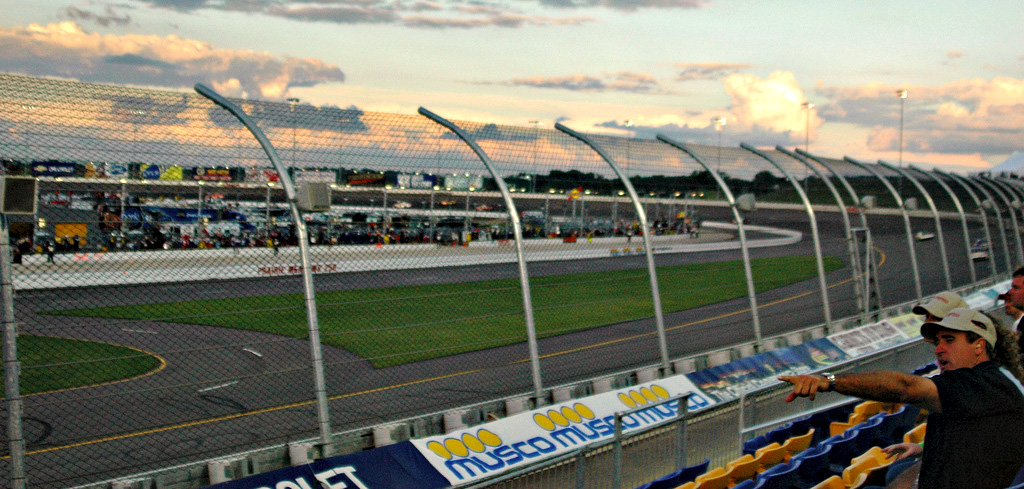
Iowa Speedway, the track where the race was held.

Iowa Speedway is a 7/8-mile (1.4 km) paved oval motor racing track in Newton, Iowa, United States, approximately 30 miles (48 km) east of Des Moines. The track was designed with influence from Rusty Wallace and patterned after Richmond Raceway, a short track where Wallace was very successful. It has over 25,000 permanent seats as well as a unique multi-tiered Recreational Vehicle viewing area along the backstretch. The track hosts the NTT IndyCar Series and NASCAR events.

After the 2020 race was canceled due to the pandemic, the race was removed from the 2021 schedule. In 2024, it was announced that the Xfinity Series would return to Iowa with a Cup Series race.

=== Entry list ===
- (R) denotes rookie driver.
- (i) denotes driver who is ineligible for series driver points.

#	Driver	Team	Make
00	Sheldon Creed	Haas Factory Team	Ford
1	Carson Kvapil (R)	JR Motorsports	Chevrolet
2	Jesse Love	Richard Childress Racing	Chevrolet
4	Parker Retzlaff	Alpha Prime Racing	Chevrolet
07	Patrick Emerling (i)	SS-Green Light Racing	Chevrolet
7	Justin Allgaier	JR Motorsports	Chevrolet
8	Sammy Smith	JR Motorsports	Chevrolet
9	Ross Chastain (i)	JR Motorsports	Chevrolet
10	Daniel Dye (R)	Kaulig Racing	Chevrolet
11	Carson Hocevar (i)	Kaulig Racing	Chevrolet
14	Garrett Smithley	SS-Green Light Racing	Chevrolet
16	Christian Eckes (R)	Kaulig Racing	Chevrolet
17	Corey Day	Hendrick Motorsports	Chevrolet
18	William Sawalich (R)	Joe Gibbs Racing	Toyota
19	Justin Bonsignore	Joe Gibbs Racing	Toyota
20	Brandon Jones	Joe Gibbs Racing	Toyota
21	Austin Dillon (i)	Richard Childress Racing	Chevrolet
25	Harrison Burton	AM Racing	Ford
26	Dean Thompson (R)	Sam Hunt Racing	Toyota
27	Jeb Burton	Jordan Anderson Racing	Chevrolet
28	Kyle Sieg	RSS Racing	Ford
31	Blaine Perkins	Jordan Anderson Racing	Chevrolet
35	Tyler Tomassi	Joey Gase Motorsports	Ford
39	Ryan Sieg	RSS Racing	Ford
41	Sam Mayer	Haas Factory Team	Ford
42	Anthony Alfredo	Young's Motorsports	Chevrolet
44	Brennan Poole	Alpha Prime Racing	Chevrolet
45	Mason Massey	Alpha Prime Racing	Chevrolet
48	Nick Sanchez (R)	Big Machine Racing	Chevrolet
51	Jeremy Clements	Jeremy Clements Racing	Chevrolet
53	Joey Gase	Joey Gase Motorsports	Chevrolet
54	Taylor Gray (R)	Joe Gibbs Racing	Toyota
70	Thomas Annunziata	Cope Family Racing	Chevrolet
71	Ryan Ellis	DGM Racing	Chevrolet
74	Dawson Cram	Mike Harmon Racing	Chevrolet
88	Connor Zilisch (R)	JR Motorsports	Chevrolet
91	Josh Bilicki	DGM Racing	Chevrolet
99	Matt DiBenedetto	Viking Motorsports	Chevrolet
Official entry list

== Practice ==
The first and only practice session was held on Saturday, August 2, at 10:00 AM CST, and would last for 50 minutes. Ryan Sieg, driving for RSS Racing, would set the fastest time in the session, with a lap of 24.061, and a speed of 130.917 mph (210.690 km/h).

Pos.	#	Driver	Team	Make	Time	Speed
1	39	Ryan Sieg	RSS Racing	Ford	24.061	130.917
2	25	Harrison Burton	AM Racing	Ford	24.093	130.743
3	9	Ross Chastain (i)	JR Motorsports	Chevrolet	24.102	130.695
Full practice results

== Qualifying ==
Qualifying was held on Saturday, August 2, at 11:05 AM CST. Since Iowa Speedway is a short track, the qualifying procedure used is a single-car, two-lap system with one round. Drivers will be on track by themselves and will have two laps to post a qualifying time, and whoever sets the fastest time will win the pole.

Jesse Love, driving for Richard Childress Racing, would score the pole for the race, with a lap of 23.642, and a speed of 133.237 mph (214.424 km/h).

No drivers would fail to qualify.

=== Qualifying results ===
Pos.	#	Driver	Team	Make	Time	Speed
1	2	Jesse Love	Richard Childress Racing	Chevrolet	23.642	133.237
2	18	William Sawalich (R)	Joe Gibbs Racing	Toyota	23.672	133.069
3	11	Carson Hocevar (i)	Kaulig Racing	Chevrolet	23.712	132.844
4	88	Connor Zilisch (R)	JR Motorsports	Chevrolet	23.768	132.531
5	41	Sam Mayer	Haas Factory Team	Ford	23.800	132.353
6	21	Austin Dillon (i)	Richard Childress Racing	Chevrolet	23.805	132.325
7	39	Ryan Sieg	RSS Racing	Ford	23.867	131.981
8	1	Carson Kvapil (R)	JR Motorsports	Chevrolet	23.888	131.865
9	8	Sammy Smith	JR Motorsports	Chevrolet	23.907	131.761
10	10	Daniel Dye (R)	Kaulig Racing	Chevrolet	23.915	131.716
11	9	Ross Chastain (i)	JR Motorsports	Chevrolet	23.972	131.403
12	20	Brandon Jones	Joe Gibbs Racing	Toyota	23.973	131.398
13	99	Matt DiBenedetto	Viking Motorsports	Chevrolet	23.999	131.255
14	00	Sheldon Creed	Haas Factory Team	Ford	24.019	131.146
15	7	Justin Allgaier	JR Motorsports	Chevrolet	24.025	131.113
16	19	Justin Bonsignore	Joe Gibbs Racing	Toyota	24.042	131.021
17	25	Harrison Burton	AM Racing	Ford	24.046	130.999
18	17	Corey Day	Hendrick Motorsports	Chevrolet	24.087	130.776
19	42	Anthony Alfredo	Young's Motorsports	Chevrolet	24.088	130.771
20	26	Dean Thompson (R)	Sam Hunt Racing	Toyota	24.092	130.749
21	31	Blaine Perkins	Jordan Anderson Racing	Chevrolet	24.103	130.689
22	44	Brennan Poole	Alpha Prime Racing	Chevrolet	24.145	130.462
23	70	Thomas Annunziata	Cope Family Racing	Chevrolet	24.150	130.435
24	28	Kyle Sieg	RSS Racing	Ford	24.216	130.079
25	16	Christian Eckes (R)	Kaulig Racing	Chevrolet	24.229	130.009
26	48	Nick Sanchez (R)	Big Machine Racing	Chevrolet	24.240	129.950
27	51	Jeremy Clements	Jeremy Clements Racing	Chevrolet	24.329	129.475
28	4	Parker Retzlaff	Alpha Prime Racing	Chevrolet	24.335	129.443
29	91	Josh Bilicki	DGM Racing	Chevrolet	24.421	128.987
30	14	Garrett Smithley	SS-Green Light Racing	Chevrolet	24.458	128.792
31	45	Mason Massey	Alpha Prime Racing	Chevrolet	24.475	128.703
32	27	Jeb Burton	Jordan Anderson Racing	Chevrolet	24.489	128.629
Qualified by owner's points
33	53	Joey Gase	Joey Gase Motorsports	Chevrolet	24.489	128.629
34	71	Ryan Ellis	DGM Racing	Chevrolet	24.569	128.210
35	07	Patrick Emerling (i)	SS-Green Light Racing	Chevrolet	24.902	126.496
36	54	Taylor Gray (R)	Joe Gibbs Racing	Toyota	–	–
37	35	Tyler Tomassi	Joey Gase Motorsports	Ford	–	–
38	74	Dawson Cram	Mike Harmon Racing	Chevrolet	–	–
Official qualifying results
Official starting lineup

== Race results ==
Stage 1 Laps: 75

Pos.	#	Driver	Team	Make	Pts
1	88	Connor Zilisch (R)	JR Motorsports	Chevrolet	10
2	2	Jesse Love	Richard Childress Racing	Chevrolet	9
3	9	Ross Chastain (i)	JR Motorsports	Chevrolet	0
4	41	Sam Mayer	Haas Factory Team	Ford	7
5	18	William Sawalich (R)	Joe Gibbs Racing	Toyota	6
6	1	Carson Kvapil (R)	JR Motorsports	Chevrolet	5
7	11	Carson Hocevar (i)	Kaulig Racing	Chevrolet	0
8	10	Daniel Dye (R)	Kaulig Racing	Chevrolet	3
9	25	Harrison Burton	AM Racing	Ford	2
10	7	Justin Allgaier	JR Motorsports	Chevrolet	1

Stage 2 Laps: 75

Pos.	#	Driver	Team	Make	Pts
1	9	Ross Chastain (i)	JR Motorsports	Chevrolet	0
2	20	Brandon Jones	Joe Gibbs Racing	Toyota	9
3	54	Taylor Gray (R)	Joe Gibbs Racing	Toyota	8
4	41	Sam Mayer	Haas Factory Team	Ford	7
5	18	William Sawalich (R)	Joe Gibbs Racing	Toyota	6
6	00	Sheldon Creed	Haas Factory Team	Ford	5
7	2	Jesse Love	Richard Childress Racing	Chevrolet	4
8	25	Harrison Burton	AM Racing	Ford	3
9	1	Carson Kvapil (R)	JR Motorsports	Chevrolet	2
10	39	Ryan Sieg	RSS Racing	Ford	1

Stage 3 Laps: 100

Fin	St	#	Driver	Team	Make	Laps	Led	Status	Pts
1	5	41	Sam Mayer	Haas Factory Team	Ford	250	28	Running	54
2	1	2	Jesse Love	Richard Childress Racing	Chevrolet	250	31	Running	48
3	11	9	Ross Chastain (i)	JR Motorsports	Chevrolet	250	120	Running	0
4	4	88	Connor Zilisch (R)	JR Motorsports	Chevrolet	250	62	Running	43
5	17	25	Harrison Burton	AM Racing	Ford	250	0	Running	37
6	3	11	Carson Hocevar (i)	Kaulig Racing	Chevrolet	250	0	Running	0
7	14	00	Sheldon Creed	Haas Factory Team	Ford	250	0	Running	35
8	7	39	Ryan Sieg	RSS Racing	Ford	250	0	Running	30
9	8	1	Carson Kvapil (R)	JR Motorsports	Chevrolet	250	0	Running	35
10	25	16	Christian Eckes (R)	Kaulig Racing	Chevrolet	250	0	Running	27
11	2	18	William Sawalich (R)	Joe Gibbs Racing	Toyota	250	0	Running	38
12	16	19	Justin Bonsignore	Joe Gibbs Racing	Toyota	250	0	Running	25
13	28	4	Parker Retzlaff	Alpha Prime Racing	Chevrolet	250	0	Running	24
14	6	21	Austin Dillon (i)	Richard Childress Racing	Chevrolet	250	0	Running	0
15	9	8	Sammy Smith	JR Motorsports	Chevrolet	250	3	Running	22
16	15	7	Justin Allgaier	JR Motorsports	Chevrolet	250	1	Running	22
17	36	54	Taylor Gray (R)	Joe Gibbs Racing	Toyota	250	2	Running	28
18	24	28	Kyle Sieg	RSS Racing	Ford	250	0	Running	19
19	26	48	Nick Sanchez (R)	Big Machine Racing	Chevrolet	250	0	Running	18
20	22	44	Brennan Poole	Alpha Prime Racing	Chevrolet	250	0	Running	17
21	29	91	Josh Bilicki	DGM Racing	Chevrolet	250	0	Running	16
22	27	51	Jeremy Clements	Jeremy Clements Racing	Chevrolet	250	0	Running	15
23	12	20	Brandon Jones	Joe Gibbs Racing	Toyota	250	3	Running	23
24	18	17	Corey Day	Hendrick Motorsports	Chevrolet	249	0	Running	13
25	34	71	Ryan Ellis	DGM Racing	Chevrolet	249	0	Running	12
26	19	42	Anthony Alfredo	Young's Motorsports	Chevrolet	249	0	Running	11
27	33	53	Joey Gase	Joey Gase Motorsports	Chevrolet	249	0	Running	10
28	21	31	Blaine Perkins	Jordan Anderson Racing	Chevrolet	249	0	Running	9
29	32	27	Jeb Burton	Jordan Anderson Racing	Chevrolet	249	0	Running	8
30	35	07	Patrick Emerling (i)	SS-Green Light Racing	Chevrolet	249	0	Running	0
31	20	26	Dean Thompson (R)	Sam Hunt Racing	Toyota	248	0	Running	6
32	23	70	Thomas Annunziata	Cope Family Racing	Chevrolet	248	0	Running	5
33	30	14	Garrett Smithley	SS-Green Light Racing	Chevrolet	247	0	Running	4
34	37	35	Tyler Tomassi	Joey Gase Motorsports	Ford	240	0	Running	3
35	13	99	Matt DiBenedetto	Viking Motorsports	Chevrolet	221	0	Accident	2
36	10	10	Daniel Dye (R)	Kaulig Racing	Chevrolet	200	0	Accident	4
37	31	45	Mason Massey	Alpha Prime Racing	Chevrolet	172	0	Suspension	1
38	38	74	Dawson Cram	Mike Harmon Racing	Chevrolet	93	0	Vibration	1
Official race results

== Standings after the race ==
Drivers' Championship standings

	Pos	Driver	Points
1	1	Connor Zilisch	772
1	2	Justin Allgaier	772 (–0)
	3	Sam Mayer	756 (–16)
	4	Jesse Love	702 (–70)
	5	Austin Hill	650 (–122)
1	6	Carson Kvapil	622 (–150)
1	7	Brandon Jones	618 (–154)
	8	Sheldon Creed	611 (–161)
	9	Taylor Gray	596 (–176)
	10	Sammy Smith	567 (–205)
2	11	Harrison Burton	546 (–226)
	12	Nick Sanchez	535 (–237)
Official driver's standings

Manufacturers' Championship standings

Pos	Manufacturer	Points
1	Chevrolet	860
2	Toyota	712 (–148)
3	Ford	706 (–154)

- Note: Only the first 12 positions are included for the driver standings.

Previous race: 2025 Pennzoil 250	NASCAR Xfinity Series; 2025 season	Next race: 2025 Mission 200 at The Glen
