= Tyler Tomassi =

American racing driver (born 2003)

- Tomassi at Madera Speedway in 2026
- Born: May 20, 2003 (age 23); West Greenwich, Rhode Island, U.S.

NASCAR O'Reilly Auto Parts Series career
- 3 races run over 2 years
- 2026 position: 57th
- Best finish: 57th (2026)
- First race: 2025 Hy-Vee PERKS 250 (Iowa)
- Last race: 2026 Hy-Vee PERKS 250 (Iowa)
Wins	Top tens	Poles
0	0	0

NASCAR FedEx Freight Truck Series career
- 11 races run over 3 years
- 2026 position: 118th
- Best finish: 70th (2024)
- First race: 2024 TSport 200 (IRP)
- Last race: 2026 Black's Tire 200 (Martinsville)
Wins	Top tens	Poles
0	0	0

ARCA Menards Series career
- 3 races run over 2 years
- Best finish: 64th (2024)
- First race: 2024 Circle City 200 (IRP)
- Last race: 2026 General Tire 150 (Phoenix)
Wins	Top tens	Poles
0	0	0

ARCA Menards Series East career
- 2 races run over 1 year
- Best finish: 32nd (2024)
- First race: 2024 Circle City 200 (IRP)
- Last race: 2024 Sprecher 150 (Milwaukee)
Wins	Top tens	Poles
0	0	0

ARCA Menards Series West career
- 10 races run over 1 year
- Best finish: 11th (2026)
- First race: 2026 General Tire 150 (Phoenix)
- Last race: 2026 NAPA Auto Parts 150 (Bakersfield)
Wins	Top tens	Poles
0	3	0
- Statistics up to date as of November 7, 2026.

Tyler Tomassi (born May 20, 2003) is an American professional stock car racing driver. He last competed part-time in the NASCAR Craftsman Truck Series, driving the No. 69 Ford F-150/Ram 1500 for MBM Motorsports, part-time in the NASCAR O'Reilly Auto Parts Series, driving the No. 53 Chevrolet Camaro SS for Joey Gase Motorsports with Scott Osteen, and part-time in the ARCA Menards Series and ARCA Menards Series West, driving the No. 51/72 Chevrolet for Strike Mamba Racing. He has previously competed in the ARCA Menards Series East.

== Racing career ==
Tomassi has previously competed in series such as the ACT Late Model Tour, the PASS North Super Late Model Series, and the Granite State Pro Stock Series.

In 2024, it was revealed that Tomassi would make his NASCAR Craftsman Truck Series debut at Lucas Oil Indianapolis Raceway Park, driving the No. 22 Ford for Reaume Brothers Racing. It was later revealed that he would also make his debut in the ARCA Menards Series at the same track, driving the No. 93 Ford for CW Motorsports. In the ARCA race, Tomassi qualified in twentieth and finished seven laps down in seventeenth, and in the Truck Series race, he started and finished in 31st place. He then ran the following East Series race at the Milwaukee Mile, where he finished in fifteenth.

On January 15, 2025, it was announced that Tomassi would attempt to make his debut in the NASCAR Xfinity Series, driving the No. 66 Ford for MBM Motorsports at Bristol Motor Speedway and Martinsville Speedway. However, he failed to qualify for both races. He did eventually make his series debut at Iowa Speedway, where he drove the No. 35 Ford for Joey Gase Motorsports with Scott Osteen in a collaborative effort with MBM Motorsports, where he finished in 34th. That same year, he made seven starts in the Truck Series, where he split time between driving for Reaume Brothers Racing and MBM Motorsports.

Tomassi's No. 51 car at All American Speedway in 2026

In 2026, it was announced that Tomassi would run the No. 69 Ford for MBM at Daytona International Speedway, where he would fail to qualify. He would then be announced to run at the following race at EchoPark Speedway for the team. That same year, he also made a return to ARCA, this time running select races in the ARCA Menards Series West for Strike Mamba Racing, where he had three top-ten finishes with a best finish of seventh at the Las Vegas Motor Speedway Bullring and finished 11th in the points.

== Motorsports career results ==
=== Stock car career summary ===
Season	Series	Team	Races	Wins	Top 5	Top 10	Points	Position
2024	ARCA Menards Series East	CW Motorsports	2	0	0	0	56	32nd
2024	ARCA Menards Series	CW Motorsports	2	0	0	0	56	64th
2024	NASCAR Craftsman Truck Series	Reaume Brothers Racing	1	0	0	0	9	70th
2024	NASCAR Craftsman Truck Series	Young's Motorsports	1	0	0	0	9	70th
2025	NASCAR Craftsman Truck Series	Reaume Brothers Racing	4	0	0	0	0	NC†
2025	NASCAR Craftsman Truck Series	MBM Motorsports	3	0	0	0	0	NC†
2025	NASCAR Xfinity Series	MBM Motorsports	0	0	0	0	3	72nd
2025	NASCAR Xfinity Series	Joey Gase Motorsports with Scott Osteen	1	0	0	0	3	72nd
2026	ARCA Menards Series West	Strike Mamba Racing	10	0	0	3	299	11th
2026	ARCA Menards Series	Strike Mamba Racing	1	0	0	0	11	133rd
2026	NASCAR Craftsman Truck Series	MBM Motorsports	2	0	0	0	0	NC†
2026	NASCAR O'Reilly Auto Parts Series	Joey Gase Motorsports with Scott Osteen	2	0	0	0	9	57th

^{†} As Tomassi was a guest driver, he was ineligible for championship points.

=== NASCAR ===
(key) (Bold – Pole position awarded by qualifying time. Italics – Pole position earned by points standings or practice time. * – Most laps led.)

==== O'Reilly Auto Parts Series ====
NASCAR O'Reilly Auto Parts Series results
Year	Team	No.	Make	1	2	3	4	5	6	7	8	9	10	11	12	13	14	15	16	17	18	19	20	21	22	23	24	25	26	27	28	29	30	31	32	33	NOAPSC	Pts	Ref
2025	MBM Motorsports	66	Ford	DAY	ATL	COA	PHO	LVS	HOM	MAR; DNQ	DAR	BRI; DNQ	CAR	TAL	TEX	CLT	NSH	MXC	POC	ATL	CSC	SON	DOV	IND													72nd	3	
2025	Joey Gase Motorsports with Scott Osteen	35	Ford																						IOW; 34	GLN	DAY	PIR	GTW	BRI	KAN	ROV	LVS	TAL	MAR	PHO	72nd	3	
2026	Joey Gase Motorsports with Scott Osteen	53	Chevy	DAY	ATL	COA	PHO	LVS	DAR	MAR	ROC	BRI	KAN	TAL	TEX	GLN	DOV	CLT	NSS	POC	COR	SON	CHI; 33	ATL	IND												57th	9	
2026	Joey Gase Motorsports with Scott Osteen	53	Toyota																							IOW; 32	DAY	DAR	GTW	BRI	LVS	CLT	PHO	TAL	MAR	HOM	57th	9	

==== Craftsman Truck Series ====
NASCAR Craftsman Truck Series results
Year	Team	No.	Make	1	2	3	4	5	6	7	8	9	10	11	12	13	14	15	16	17	18	19	20	21	22	23	24	25	NCTC	Pts	Ref
2024	Reaume Brothers Racing	22	Ford	DAY	ATL	LVS	BRI	COA	MAR	TEX	KAN	DAR	NWS	CLT	GTW	NSH	POC	IRP; 31	RCH	MLW									70th	9	
2024	Young's Motorsports	46	Chevy																		BRI; 34	KAN	TAL	HOM	MAR	PHO			70th	9	
2025	Reaume Brothers Racing	22	Ford	DAY	ATL	LVS	HOM	MAR	BRI; 21	CAR	TEX	KAN	NWS; 31	CLT	NSH; 29	MCH													100th	0^{1}	
2025	MBM Motorsports	69	Ford														POC; 24	LRP	IRP	GLN	RCH	DAR	BRI		ROV; 29	TAL; 27	MAR	PHO	100th	0^{1}	
2025	Reaume Brothers Racing	33	Ford																					NHA; 27					100th	0^{1}	
2026	MBM Motorsports	69	Ford	DAY; DNQ	ATL; 29	STP	DAR	ROC	BRI	TEX	GLN	DOV	CLT	NSS	MCH	COR	LRP	NWS	IRP	RCH	NHA	BRI	KAN	CLT	PHO	TAL			118th	0^{1}	
2026	MBM Motorsports	69	Ram																								MAR; 28	HOM	118th	0^{1}	

^{*} Season still in progress
^{1} Ineligible for series points

=== ARCA Menards Series ===
(key) (Bold – Pole position awarded by qualifying time. Italics – Pole position earned by points standings or practice time. * – Most laps led.)

ARCA Menards Series results
Year	Team	No.	Make	1	2	3	4	5	6	7	8	9	10	11	12	13	14	15	16	17	18	19	20	AMSC	Pts	Ref
2024	CW Motorsports	93	Ford	DAY	PHO	TAL	DOV	KAN	CLT	IOW	MOH	BLN	IRP; 17	SLM	ELK	MCH	ISF	MLW; 15	DSF	GLN	BRI	KAN	TOL	64th	56	
2026	Strike Mamba Racing	51	Chevy	DAY	PHO; 33	KAN	TAL	GLN	TOL	MCH	POC	BER	ELK	CHI	LRP	IRP	IOW	ISF	MAD	DSF	SLM	BRI	KAN	133rd	11	

==== ARCA Menards Series East ====
ARCA Menards Series East results
Year	Team	No.	Make	1	2	3	4	5	6	7	8	AMSEC	Pts	Ref
2024	CW Motorsports	93	Ford	FIF	DOV	NSV	FRS	IOW	IRP; 17	MLW; 15	BRI	32nd	56	

==== ARCA Menards Series West ====
ARCA Menards Series West results
Year	Team	No.	Make	1	2	3	4	5	6	7	8	9	10	11	12	13	AMSWC	Pts	Ref
2026	Strike Mamba Racing	51	Chevy	KER	PHO; 33	TUC; 14	SHA; 10		TRI; 9	SON; 16	PIR	AAS; 11	MAD; 14			KER; 13	11th	299	
2026	Strike Mamba Racing	72	Chevy					CNS; 14						LVS; 7	PHO		11th	299	
