= AM Racing =

American stock car racing team

AM Racing Future Focused
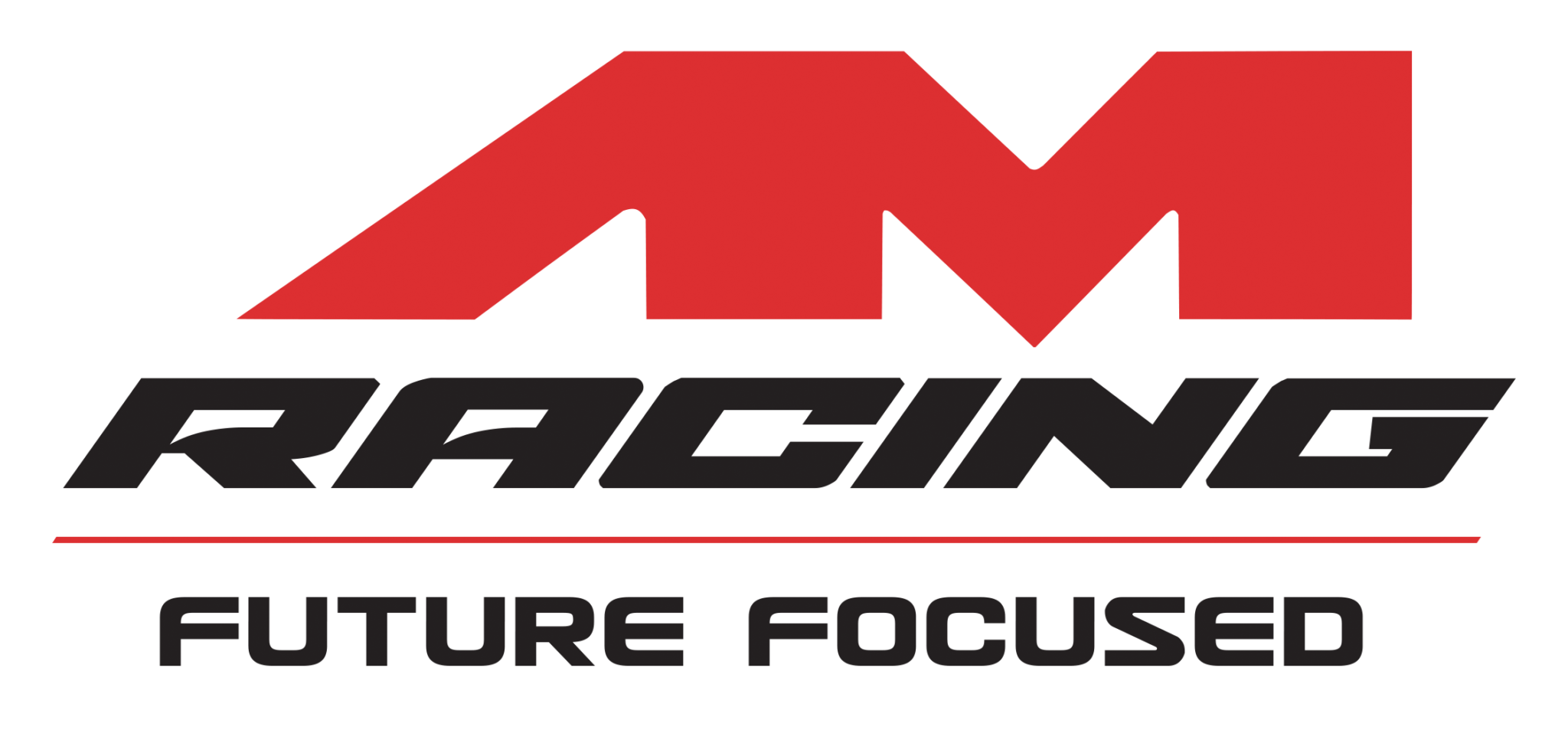
- Owner: Tim Self
- Principal(s): Kevin Cywinski (Operator); Wade Moore (President)
- Base: Statesville, North Carolina
- Series: NASCAR O'Reilly Auto Parts Series
- Manufacturer: Ford
- Opened: 2016
- Closed: 2026

Career
- Debut: O'Reilly Auto Parts Series: 2023 Beef. It's What's for Dinner. 300 (Daytona); Truck Series: 2016 NextEra Energy Resources 250 (Daytona); ARCA Menards Series: 2021 Lucas Oil 200 (Daytona); ARCA Menards Series East: 2023 Calypso Lemonade 150 (Iowa); ARCA Menards Series West: 2023 General Tire 150 (Phoenix)
- Latest race: O'Reilly Auto Parts Series: 2026 NFPA 250 (Martinsville); Truck Series: 2023 NASCAR Craftsman Truck Series Championship Race (Phoenix); ARCA Menards Series: 2025 Henry Ford Health 200 (Michigan); ARCA Menards Series East: 2025 Rockingham ARCA 125 (Rockingham); ARCA Menards Series West: 2025 General Tire 150 (Phoenix)
- Races competed: Total: 307; O'Reilly Auto Parts Series: 106; Truck Series: 136; ARCA Menards Series: 50; ARCA Menards Series East: 11; ARCA Menards Series West: 4
- Drivers' Championships: Total: 0 O'Reilly Auto Parts Series: 0 Truck Series: 0 ARCA Menards Series: 0 ARCA Menards Series East: 0 ARCA Menards Series West: 0
- Race victories: Total: 0 O'Reilly Auto Parts Series: 0 Truck Series: 0 ARCA Menards Series: 0 ARCA Menards Series East: 0 ARCA Menards Series West: 0
- Pole positions: Total: 1 O'Reilly Auto Parts Series: 1 Truck Series: 0 ARCA Menards Series: 0 ARCA Menards Series East: 0 ARCA Menards Series West: 0

AM Racing was an American professional stock car racing team that competed in the NASCAR O'Reilly Auto Parts Series, NASCAR Craftsman Truck Series and ARCA Menards Series.

AM Racing merged into Niece Motorsports for the 2018 season, but split from Niece in 2019 and fielded its own entries again. In 2020, the team moved to the former Front Row Motorsports race shop in Statesville, North Carolina, which they shared with Jordan Anderson Racing and Win-Tron Racing, although the three teams did not merge and remained separate organizations. However, on January 14, 2021, it was announced that AM and Win-Tron would be merging for 2021. On November 24, 2025, it was announced that the team would be acquired by fellow ARCA team Sigma Performance Services starting in 2026. They would continue to field entries in the O'Reilly Auto Parts Series as well as ARCA as SPS Racing, although on January 30, 2026, it was announced that the acquisition was never finalized. On May 15, it was announced the team formally ceased operations.

== O'Reilly Auto Parts Series ==
=== Car No. 25 history ===
Brett Moffitt (2023)

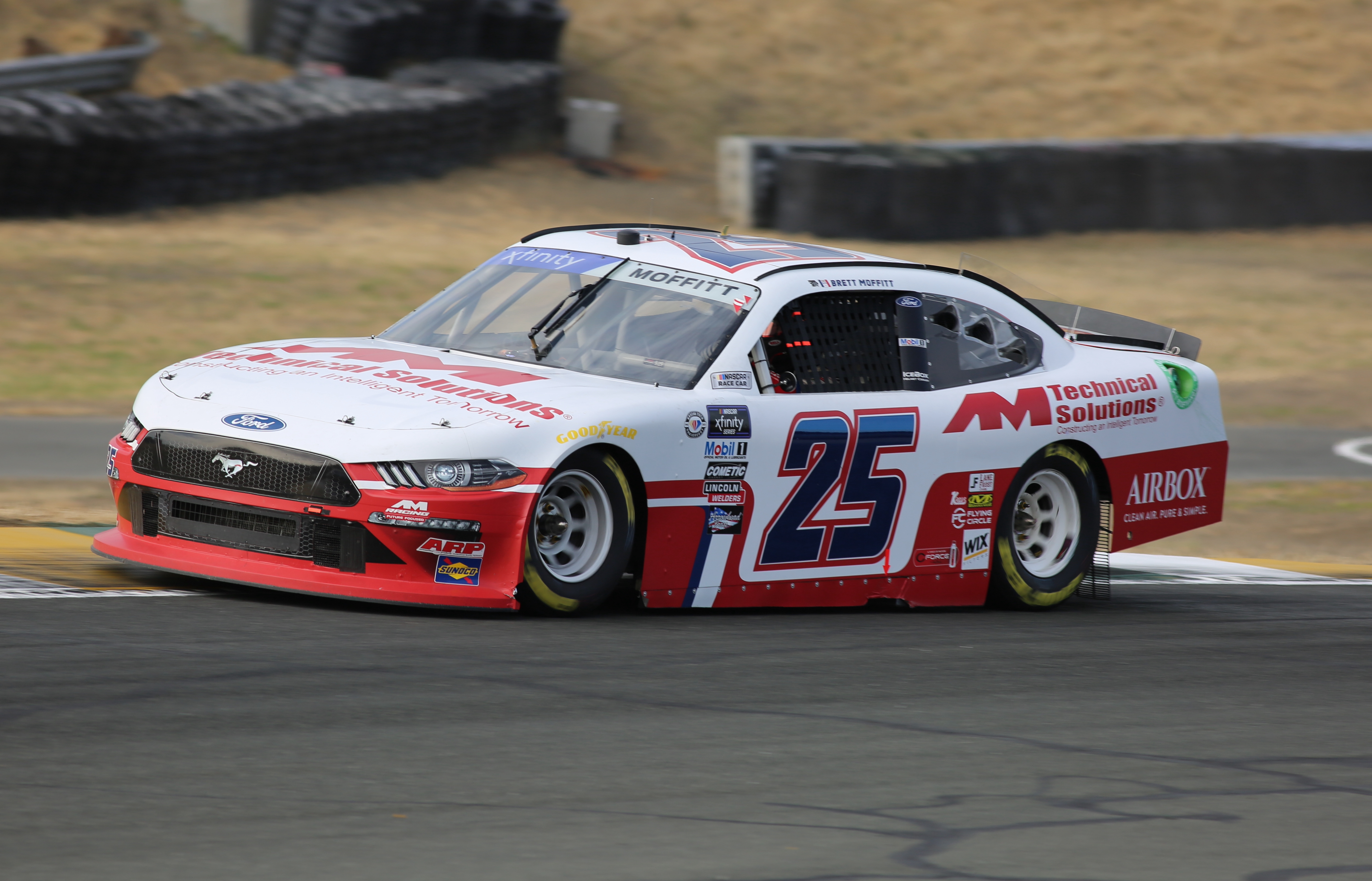
Brett Moffitt in the No. 25 at Sonoma Raceway in 2023

On October 7, 2022, the team announced that they would field an entry into the NASCAR Xfinity Series in 2023. It was announced on December 12 that Brett Moffitt would drive for the team full-time in the No. 25 in 2023.

Hailie Deegan and multiple drivers (2024)

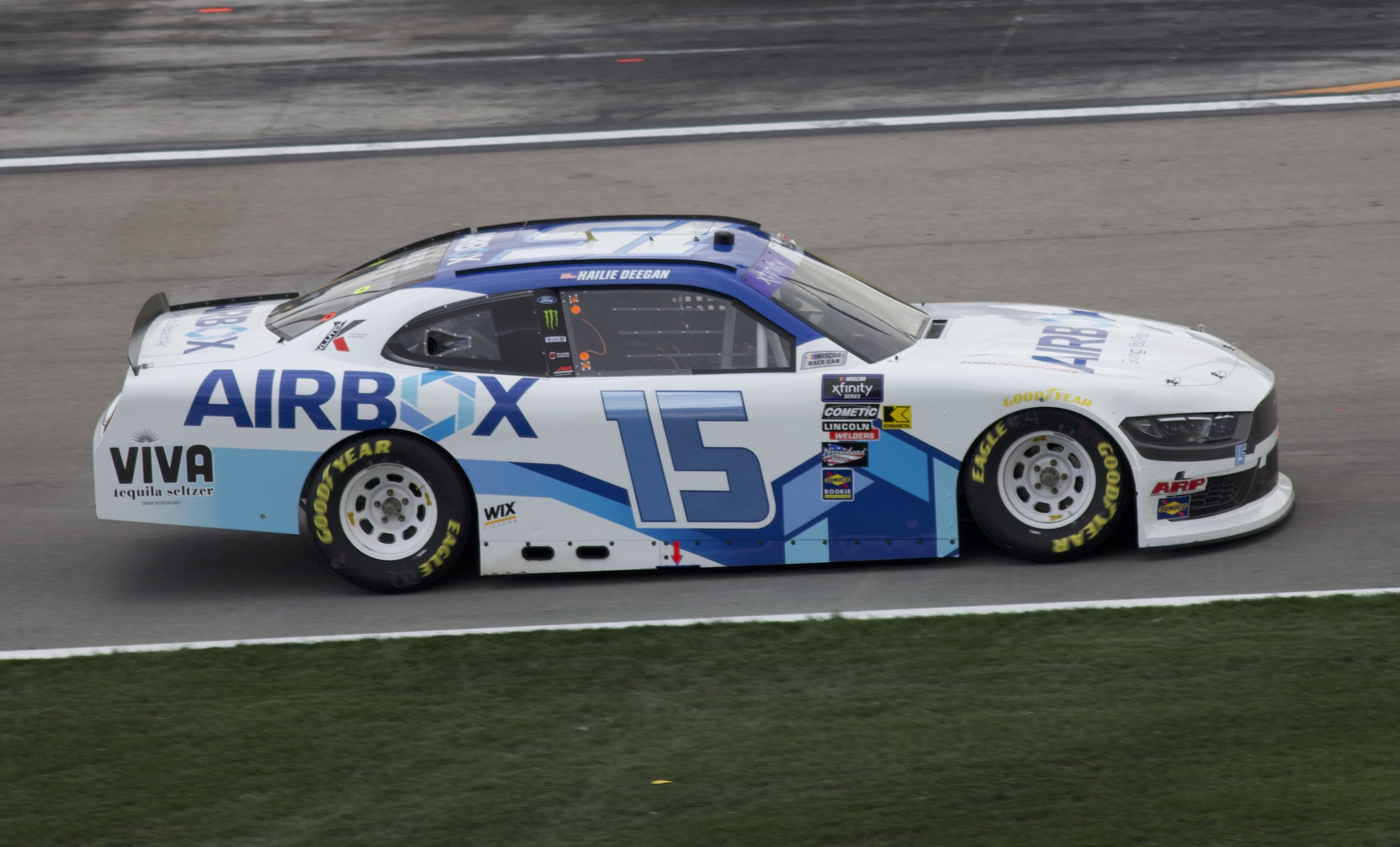
Deegan's No. 15 car at Las Vegas Motor Speedway in 2024.

On September 23, 2023, AM Racing announced their desire to field a second Xfinity Series team in 2024. On October 5, the team announced that they had signed Hailie Deegan to a multi-year deal to drive the No. 15 beginning the following season. AirBox, Inc. and Viva Tequila Seltzer were announced as the sponsors for the entry.

On January 17, 2024, the team announced that they would not field the No. 25 in the season-opener at Daytona, as it most likely would be fielded later in the spring. The No. 25 points would then be moved to the No. 15.

Following a string of disappointing finishes, AM Racing signed two-time Cup Series champion Joey Logano to replace Deegan for the Chicago street race, where he finished eighth. On July 8, AM Racing and Deegan officially announced that they would go their separate ways. Josh Berry signed to drive the No. 15 at Pocono and at Indy. Lawless Alan was announced to make his Xfinty series debut in the No. 15 at Michigan.

Harrison Burton (2025)

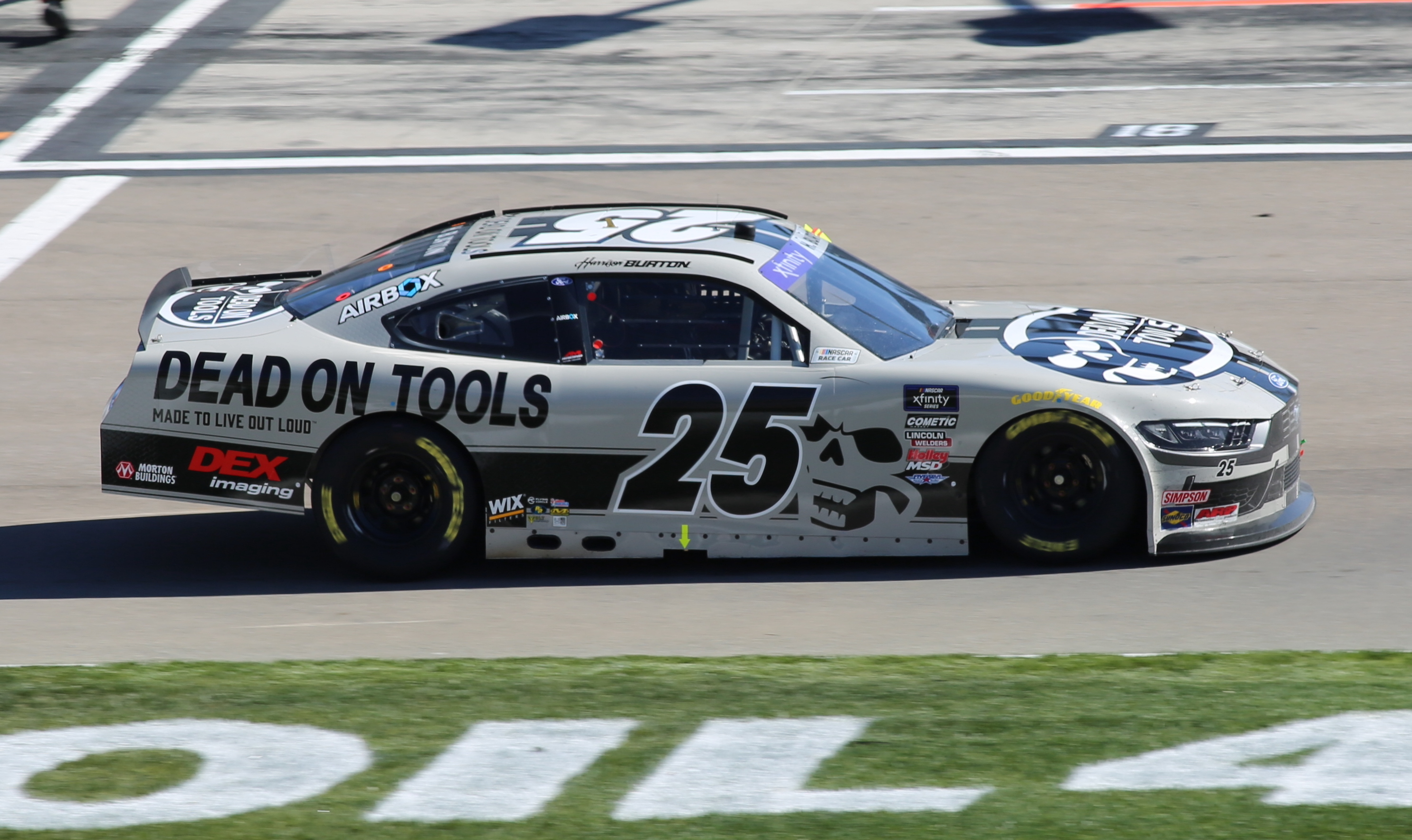
Harrison Burton in the No. 25 car at Las Vegas Motor Speedway in 2025

Harrison Burton was announced as the driver of the No. 25 car for the 2025 season on September 20, 2024.

Nick Sanchez (2026)

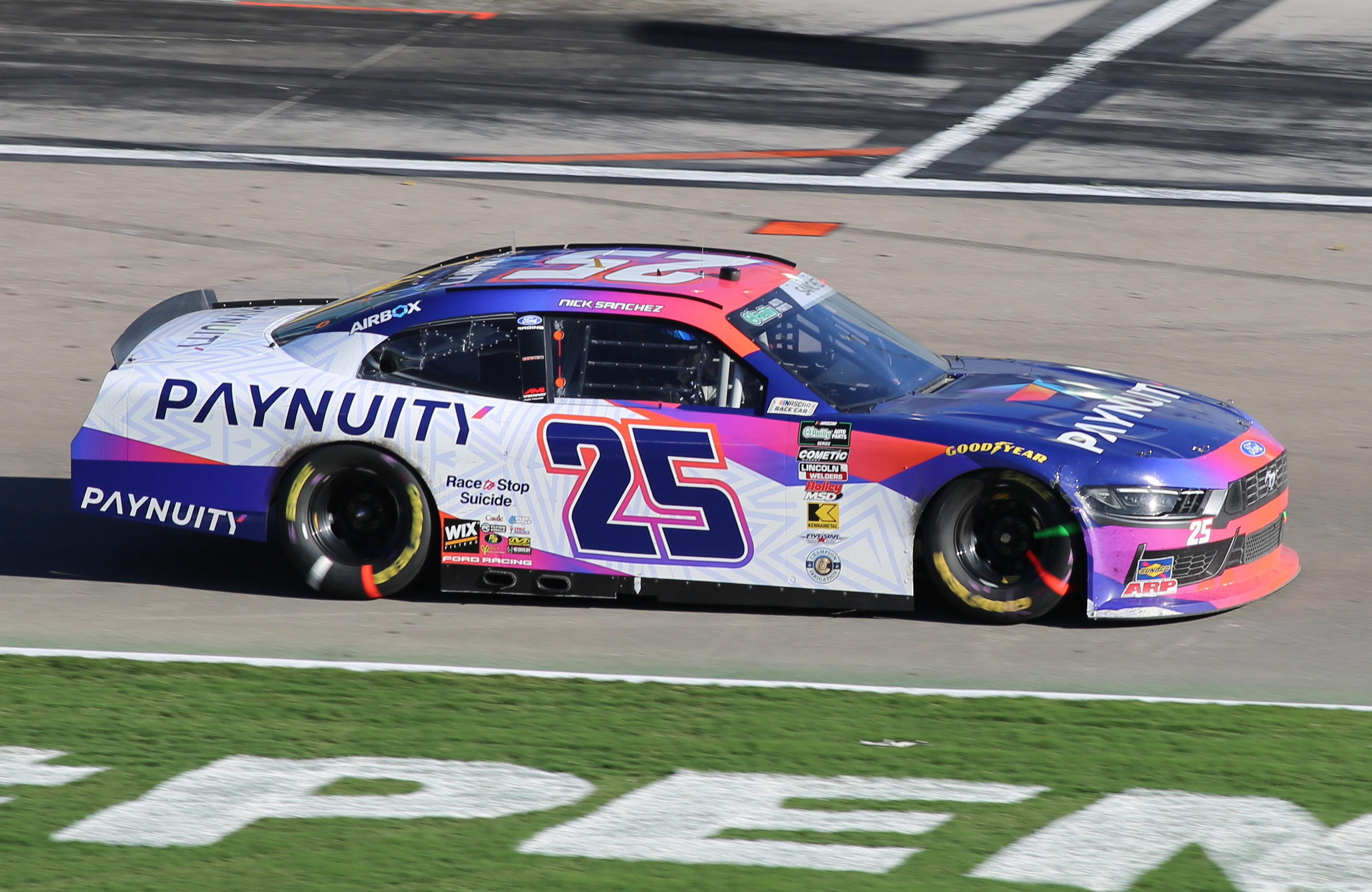
Nick Sanchez in the No. 25 car at Las Vegas Motor Speedway in 2026

On October 8, 2025, Burton announced that he won't return to AM Racing for 2026. On February 9, 2026, it was announced that Nick Sanchez would drive the No. 25 car for the 2026 season.

==== Car No. 25 results ====
Year	Driver	No.	Make	1	2	3	4	5	6	7	8	9	10	11	12	13	14	15	16	17	18	19	20	21	22	23	24	25	26	27	28	29	30	31	32	33	Owners	Pts	Ref
2023	Brett Moffitt	25	Ford	DAY; 29	CAL; 9	LVS; 22	PHO; 13	ATL; 6	COA; 34	RCH; 22	MAR; 9	TAL; 12*	DOV; 15	DAR; 20	CLT; 29	PIR; 12	SON; 12	NSH; 14	CSC; 4	ATL; 11	NHA; 9	POC; 8	ROA; 36	MCH; 17	IRC; 10	GLN; 29	DAY; 18	DAR; 25	KAN; 7	BRI; 16	TEX; 10	ROV; 38	LVS; 24	HOM; 35	MAR; 20	PHO; 15	17th	680	
2024	Hailie Deegan	15	Ford	DAY; 37	ATL; 27	LVS; 15	PHO; 33	COA; 23	RCH; 31	MAR; 18	TEX; 23	TAL; 12	DOV; 31	DAR; 36	CLT; 20	PIR; 33	SON; 32	IOW; 25	NHA; 32	NSH; 28																	32nd	363	
2024	Joey Logano	15	Ford																		CSC; 8					DAR; 38		GLN; 9									32nd	363	
2024	Josh Berry	15	Ford																			POC; 27	IND; 38														32nd	363	
2024	Lawless Alan	15	Ford																					MCH; 35			ATL; 13										32nd	363	
2024	Gus Dean	15	Ford																						DAY; 36												32nd	363	
2024	Logan Bearden	15	Ford																										BRI; 27	KAN; 33							32nd	363	
2024	Dylan Lupton	15	Ford																												TAL; 24	ROV; 27	LVS; 27	HOM; 32	MAR; 20	PHO; 19	32nd	363	
2025	Harrison Burton	25	Ford	DAY; 6	ATL; 10	COA; 35	PHO; 20	LVS; 8	HOM; 11	MAR; 24	DAR; 13	BRI; 26	CAR; 3	TAL; 8	TEX; 6	CLT; 21	NSH; 12	MXC; 9	POC; 14	ATL; 13	CSC; 13	SON; 21	DOV; 11	IND; 18	IOW; 5	GLN; 10	DAY; 16	PIR; 12	GTW; 22	BRI; 7	KAN; 20	ROV; 34	LVS; 14	TAL; 13	MAR; 11	PHO; 11	12th	804	
2026	Nick Sanchez	25	Ford	DAY; 37	ATL; 3	COA; 25	PHO; 35	LVS; 38	DAR; 16	MAR; 33	ROC; Wth	BRI	KAN	TAL	TEX	GLN	DOV	CLT	NSS	POC	COR	SON	CHI	ATL	IND	IOW	DAY	DAR	GTW	BRI	LVS	CLT	PHO	TAL	MAR	HOM	39th	81	

=== Car No. 52 history ===
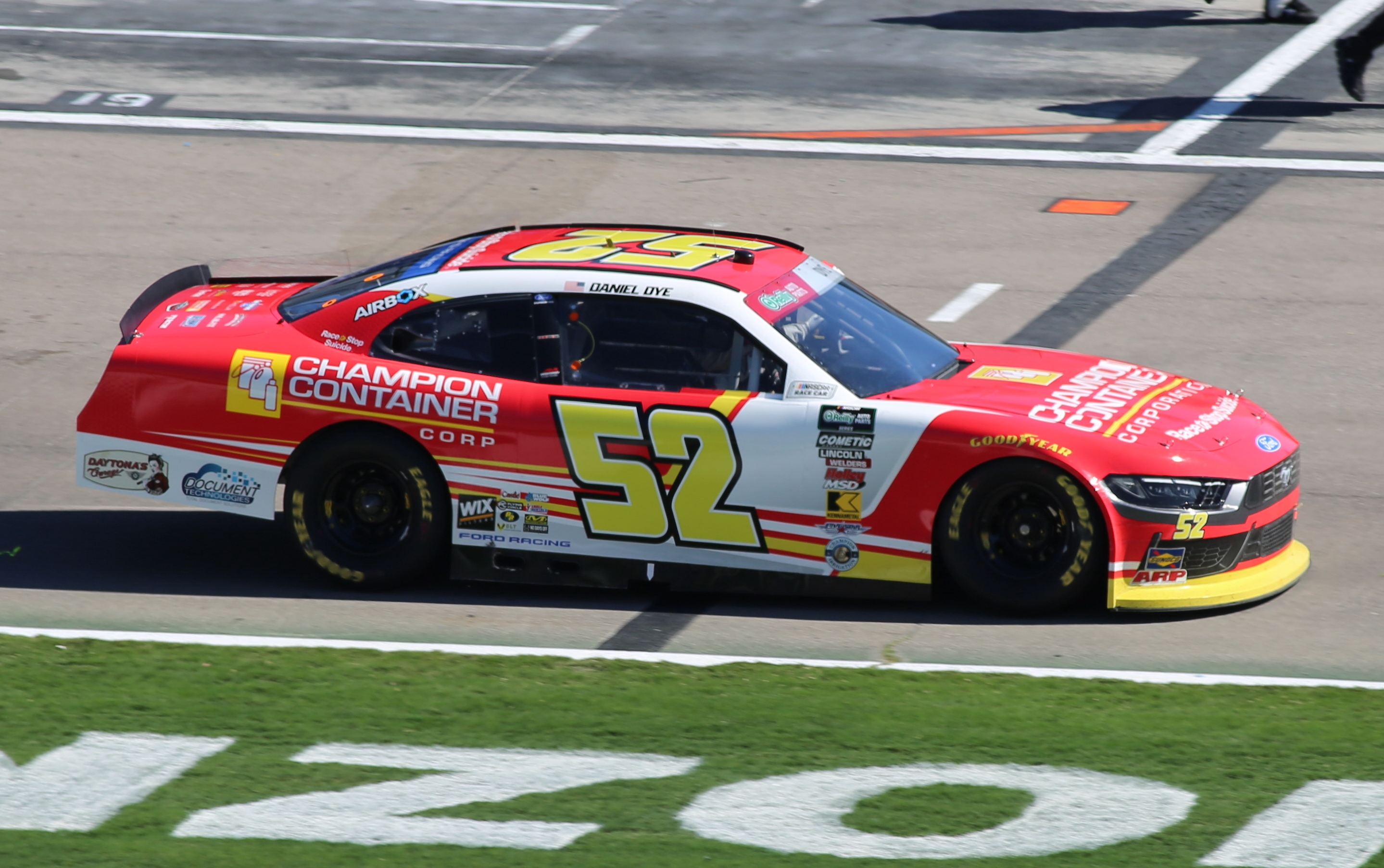
Daniel Dye in the No. 52 car at Las Vegas Motor Speedway in 2026

On February 9, 2026, AM Racing announced that Daniel Dye would compete in the No. 52 on a part-time basis for the 2026 season.

==== Car No. 52 results ====
Year	Driver	No.	Make	1	2	3	4	5	6	7	8	9	10	11	12	13	14	15	16	17	18	19	20	21	22	23	24	25	26	27	28	29	30	31	32	33	Owners	Pts	Ref
2026	Daniel Dye	52	Ford	DAY; 21	ATL	COA	PHO; 20	LVS; 15	DAR	MAR	ROC	BRI	KAN	TAL	TEX	GLN	DOV	CLT	NSS	POC	COR	SON	CHI	ATL	IND	IOW	DAY	DAR	GTW	BRI	LVS	CLT	PHO	TAL	MAR	HOM	42nd	55	

=== Car No. 76 history ===
On September 1, 2025, AM Racing announced that Kole Raz would attempt to make his NASCAR Xfinity Series debut at World Wide Technology Raceway driving the No. 76 car.

==== Car No. 76 results ====
Year	Driver	No.	Make	1	2	3	4	5	6	7	8	9	10	11	12	13	14	15	16	17	18	19	20	21	22	23	24	25	26	27	28	29	30	31	32	33	Owners	Pts	Ref
2025	Kole Raz	76	Ford	DAY	ATL	COA	PHO	LVS	HOM	MAR	DAR	BRI	CAR	TAL	TEX	CLT	NSH	MXC	POC	ATL	CSC	SON	DOV	IND	IOW	GLN	DAY	PIR	GTW; 34	BRI	KAN; 35	ROV	LVS	TAL	MAR	PHO	48th	5	

== Craftsman Truck Series ==
=== Truck No. 22 history ===
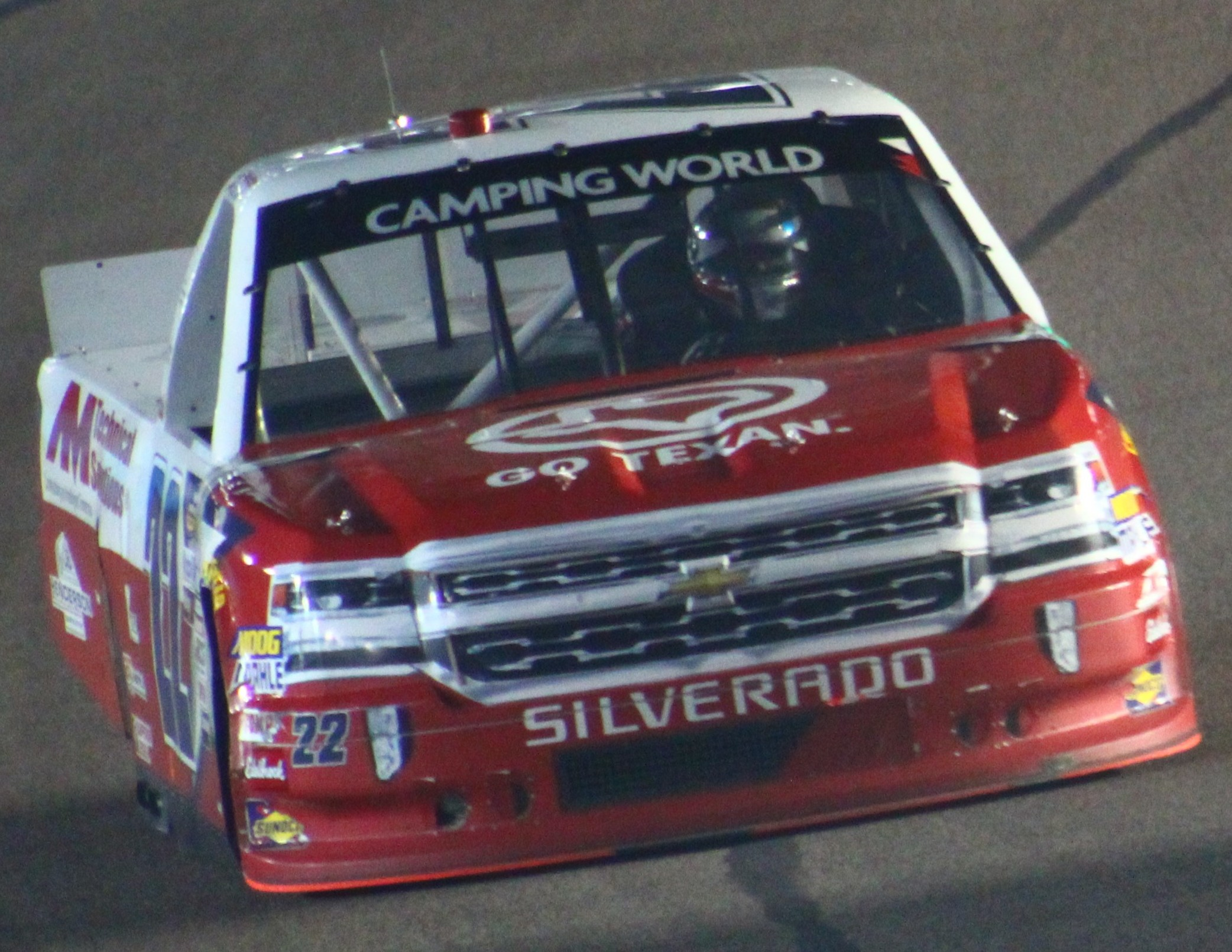
Austin Wayne Self in the No. 22 in 2018

In December 2015, it was announced that AM Racing would enter one truck in the Camping World Truck Series field, the No. 22 Toyota Tundra full-time for Austin Wayne Self. The team's first race was the season opener at Daytona, where Self qualified the truck 19th and finished in that same position, one lap down. In the second race at Atlanta, Self qualified twentieth and finished sixteenth. Self failed to qualify for the third race at Martinsville, but raced with the No. 44 after Tommy Joe Martins crashed his only truck in qualifying and had no backup. Self had variable runs throughout the first half of the season until he broke through for his first top ten, a ninth at the Aspen Dental Eldora Dirt Derby.

The team's operations were taken over by Win-Tron Racing after twelve races. The Self family retained an ownership stake in the team.

After the merger with Win-Tron, performance remained nearly the same, with Austin Wayne Self turning in runs from the teens to twenties. At Martinsville, the team replaced Self with Justin Fontaine, who would be making his Truck debut. Fontaine qualified on owner points in 29th and moved up three places during the race to finish 26th. Self then took over the truck for the Striping Technology 350, finishing 22nd. For the Phoenix race, Self was again swapped out, this time for the son of NASCAR on NBC broadcaster Marty Snider, Myatt Snider. Snider qualified nineteenth and finished seventeenth. Self closed out the season at Homestead-Miami Speedway, finishing 25th. The No. 22 truck finished 22nd in owner points in its debut season.

For the 2017 season, AM Racing announced a partnership with Joe Gibbs Racing for engine power. On February 10, 2017, it was announced that J. J. Yeley would drive the No. 22 Legrand Tundra at the season opener at Daytona, while Self would drive the No. 32 truck. The team would run five races in total during the year under the AM Racing banner, the other four with Self behind the wheel. AM partnered with Niece Motorsports and Martins Motorsports to run Self in most of the remaining races.

In October 2017, it was announced that Self would move to Niece Motorsports for the 2018 season.

AM Racing reopened in 2019, with Self in the No. 22 for another full season. Self got the team their first top-five at Michigan Speedway. However, Self was suspended in April of that year due to violating NASCAR's substance abuse policy, and Bubba Wallace filled in for 2 races (at Martinsville and Texas in March) before Self was reinstated.

Self returned full-time in 2020. He got two top-ten finishes that year, at Texas Motor Speedway and Martinsville Speedway, and finished sixteenth in points.

In January 2024, the No. 22 truck owner points were bought by Reaume Brothers Racing.

==== Truck No. 22 results ====
Year	Driver	No.	Make	1	2	3	4	5	6	7	8	9	10	11	12	13	14	15	16	17	18	19	20	21	22	23	Owners	Pts	Ref
2016	Austin Wayne Self	22	Toyota	DAY; 19	ATL; 16	MAR; DNQ	KAN; 25	DOV; 32	CLT; 21	TEX; 13	IOW; 16	GTW; 28	KEN; 27	ELD; 9	POC; 25	BRI; 21	MCH; 16	MSP; 15	CHI; 17	NHA; 29	LVS; 21	TAL; 14		TEX; 22		HOM; 25	15th	279	
2016	Justin Fontaine	22	Toyota																				MAR; 26				15th	279	
2016	Myatt Snider	22	Toyota																						PHO; 17		15th	279	
2017	J. J. Yeley	22	Toyota	DAY; 9	ATL																						15th	364	
2017	Austin Wayne Self	22	Toyota			MAR; DNQ	KAN	CLT; 12	DOV	TEX; 12	GTW	IOW	KEN; 22	ELD	POC	MCH	BRI	MSP; 9	CHI	NHA	LVS	TAL	MAR	TEX	PHO	HOM	15th	364	
2019	Austin Wayne Self	22	Chevy	DAY; 9	ATL; 27	LVS; 15			DOV; 19	KAN; 27	CLT; 21	TEX; 19	IOW; 14	GTW; 17	CHI; 25	KEN; 6	POC; 15	ELD; 13	MCH; 5	BRI; 15	MSP; 14	LVS; 17	TAL; 29	MAR; 19	PHO; 18	HOM; 19	14th	442	
2019	Bubba Wallace	22	Chevy				MAR; 10	TEX; 20																			14th	442	
2020	Austin Wayne Self	22	Chevy	DAY; 31	LVS; 17	CLT; 19	ATL; 30	HOM; 16	POC; 38	KEN; 20	TEX; 14	KAN; 17	KAN; 13	MCH; 37	DAY; 11	DOV; 23	GTW; 30	DAR; 17	RCH; 14	BRI; 33	LVS; 24	TAL; 20	KAN; 19	TEX; 7	MAR; 9	PHO; 20	16th	386	
2021	Austin Wayne Self	22	Chevy	DAY; 21	DAY; 15	LVS; 14	ATL; 23	BRD; 10	RCH; 19	KAN; 16	DAR; 9	COA; 16	CLT; 17	TEX; 15	NSH; 27	POC; 19	KNX; 30	GLN; 16	GTW; 9	DAR; 14	BRI; 14	LVS; 8	TAL; 29	MAR; 20	PHO; 26		14th	447	
2022	Austin Wayne Self	22	Chevy	DAY; 13	LVS; 9	ATL; 10	COA; 27	MAR; 31	BRD; 36	DAR; 27	KAN; 23	TEX; 18	CLT; 25	GTW; 26	SON; Wth			MOH; 14		IRP; 19	RCH; 27		BRI; 20	TAL; 30		PHO; 24	25th	261	
2022	Brett Moffitt	22	Chevy													KNO; 32						KAN; 36					25th	261	
2022	Max Gutiérrez	22	Chevy														NSH; 9		POC; 21						HOM; 21		25th	261	
2023	Josh Reaume	22	Ford	DAY; 19		ATL; 23		TEX; 21			KAN; 24	DAR			GTW; Wth	NSH					MLW; 33						30th	242	
2023	Max Gutiérrez	22	Ford		LVS; 21																						30th	242	
2023	Logan Bearden	22	Ford				COA; 22													IRP; 21							30th	242	
2023	Chase Briscoe	22	Ford						BRD; 7																		30th	242	
2023	Stephen Mallozzi	22	Ford							MAR; 36								POC; 24					BRI; 32				30th	242	
2023	Josh Williams	22	Ford										NWS; 28														30th	242	
2023	Mason Maggio	22	Ford											CLT; 25								KAN; 35			HOM; 27		30th	242	
2023	Austin Wayne Self	22	Ford														MOH; 30										30th	242	
2023	Christian Rose	22	Ford																RCH; 32							PHO; 16	30th	242	
2023	Jason White	22	Ford																					TAL; 27			30th	242	

=== Truck No. 32 history ===
Austin Wayne Self piloted a second entry for the team, the No. 32, at the 2017 season-opener at Daytona. He finished a career-best second after avoiding the big one on the last lap.

==== Truck No. 32 results ====
Year	Driver	No.	Make	1	2	3	4	5	6	7	8	9	10	11	12	13	14	15	16	17	18	19	20	21	22	23	Owners	Pts	Ref
2017	Austin Wayne Self	32	Toyota	DAY; 2	ATL	MAR	KAN	CLT	DOV	TEX	GTW	IOW	KEN	ELD	POC	MCH	BRI	MSP	CHI	NHA	LVS	TAL	MAR	TEX	PHO	HOM			

=== Truck No. 37 history ===
In 2021, Brett Moffitt drove the No. 37 truck at the Corn Belt 150.

In 2022, the No. 37 returned as AM Racing's second entry and Logan Bearden would drive the truck at COTA as well as Max Gutiérrez driving at Charlotte.

==== Truck No. 37 results ====
Year	Driver	No.	Make	1	2	3	4	5	6	7	8	9	10	11	12	13	14	15	16	17	18	19	20	21	22	23	Owners	Pts	Ref
2021	Brett Moffitt	37	Chevy	DAY	DRC	LVS	ATL	BRD	RCH	KAN	DAR	COA	CLT	TEX	NSH	POC	KNX; 38	GLN	GTW	DAR	BRI	LVS	TAL	MAR	PHO				
2022	Logan Bearden	37	Chevy	DAY	LVS	ATL	COA; 28	MAR	BRD	DAR	KAN	TEX																	
2022	Max Gutiérrez	37	Chevy										CLT; 26	GTW	SON	KNX	NSH	MOH	POC	IRP	RCH	KAN	BRI	TAL	HOM	PHO			

=== Truck No. 66 history ===
Using Bolen Motorsports' owner points, Justin Fontaine drove the No. 66 truck in one race in 2017.

==== Truck No. 66 results ====
Year	Driver	No.	Make	1	2	3	4	5	6	7	8	9	10	11	12	13	14	15	16	17	18	19	20	21	22	23	Ownerd	Pts	Ref
2016	Austin Wayne Self	66	Toyota	DAY	ATL	MAR	KAN	DOV	CLT	TEX	IOW	GTW	KEN	ELD	POC	BRI	MCH	MSP	CHI	NHA	LVS	TAL	MAR	TEX	PHO; 22	HOM			
2017	Justin Fontaine	66	Toyota	DAY	ATL	MAR	KAN	CLT	DOV	TEX	GTW	IOW	KEN	ELD	POC; 15	MCH	BRI	MSP	CHI	NHA	LVS	TAL	MAR	TEX	PHO	HOM			

== ARCA Menards Series ==
=== Car No. 32 history ===
Following Win-Tron Racing's merger into AM Racing for the 2021 season. Howie DiSavino III, who drove the car part-time in 2019 and 2020, continued to do so in 2021. He made his first start at Daytona that year.

In 2022, The team fielded the No. 32 car part-time for Max Gutiérrez at Daytona and Talladega, and was also a technical alliance with Rette Jones Racing. Austin Wayne Self drove the No. 32 car once at Watkins-Glen. In October the team announced their intentions to return full-time in 2023.

On January 10, 2023, the team announced that Christian Rose would drive full-time in the main ARCA Series in their No. 32 car.

==== Car No. 32 results ====
Year	Driver	No.	Make	1	2	3	4	5	6	7	8	9	10	11	12	13	14	15	16	17	18	19	20	AMSC	Pts
2021	Howie DiSavino III	32	Chevy	DAY; 13	PHO	TAL	KAN	TOL	CLT	MOH	POC	ELK	BLN	IOW	WIN										
2021	Austin Wayne Self	32	Chevy													GLN; 9	MCH	ISF	MLW	DSF	BRI	SLM	KAN		
2022	Max Gutiérrez	32	Chevy	DAY; 32	PHO	TAL; 10	KAN	CLT	IOW	BLN	ELK	MOH	POC	IRP	MCH										
2022	Austin Wayne Self	32	Chevy													GLN; 7	ISF	MLW	DSF	KAN	BRI	SLM	TOL		
2023	Christian Rose	32	Ford	DAY; 12	PHO; 23	TAL; 17	KAN; 9	CLT; 8	BLN; 7	ELK; 10	MOH; 11	IOW; 7	POC; 9	MCH; 7	IRP; 10	GLN; 11	ISF; 12	MLW; 11	DSF; 7	KAN; 6	BRI; 8	SLM; 3	TOL; 5	3rd	889
2024	Christian Rose	32	Ford	DAY; 4	PHO; 16	TAL; 5	DOV; 21	KAN; 14	CLT; 28	IOW; 11	MOH; 11	BLN; 9	IRP; 22	SLM; 5	ELK; 10	MCH; 9	ISF; 9	MLW; 8	DSF; 8	GLN; 16	BRI; 20	KAN; 13	TOL; 9	5th	832

=== Car No. 76 history ===
On February 6, 2025, it was announced that Kole Raz would drive the No. 76 for the season-opener at Daytona.

==== Car No. 76 results ====
Year	Team	No.	Make	1	2	3	4	5	6	7	8	9	10	11	12	13	14	15	16	17	18	19	20	AMSC	Pts	Ref
2025	Kole Raz	76	Ford	DAY; 6	PHO; 6	TAL; 22	KAN	CLT; 21	MCH; 18	BER	ELK	LRP	DOV	IRP	IOW	GLN	ISF	MAD	DSF	BRI	SLM	KAN	TOL			

== ARCA Menards Series East ==
=== Car No. 32 history ===
In 2023, the team fielded the No. 32 car part-time for Christian Rose.

==== Car No. 32 results ====
Year	Driver	No.	Make	1	2	3	4	5	6	7	8	AMSWC	Pts
2023	Christian Rose	32	Ford	FIF	DOV	NSV	FRS	IOW; 7	IRP; 10	MLW; 11	BRI; 8	15th	140
2024	Christian Rose	32	Ford	FIF	DOV; 21	NSV	FRS	IOW; 11	IRP; 22	MLW; 8	BRI; 20		

=== Car No. 76 history ===
In 2025, the team fielded the No. 76 car part-time for Kole Raz.

==== Car No. 76 results ====
Year	Driver	No.	Make	1	2	3	4	5	6	7	8	AMSEC	Pts
2025	Kole Raz	76	Ford	FIF; 2	CAR; 7	NSV; Wth	FRS	DOV	IRP	IOW	BRI		

== ARCA Menards Series West ==
=== Car No. 32 history ===
In 2023, the team fielded the No. 32 car part-time for Christian Rose.

==== Car No. 32 results ====
Year	Driver	No.	Make	1	2	3	4	5	6	7	8	9	10	11	12	AMSWC	Pts
2023	Christian Rose	32	Ford	PHO; 23	IRW	KCR	PIR	SON	IRW	SHA	EVG	AAS	LVS	MAD	PHO	67th	21
2024	Christian Rose	32	Ford	PHO; 16	IRW	KER	PIR	SON	IRW	SHA	TRI	MAD	AAS	KER	PHO		

=== Car No. 76 history ===
In 2024, the team fielded the No. 76 car part-time for Kole Raz at the season-finale at Phoenix.

==== Car No. 76 results ====
Year	Driver	No.	Make	1	2	3	4	5	6	7	8	9	10	11	12	AMSWC	Pts
2024	Kole Raz	76	Ford	PHO	IRW	KER	PIR	SON	IRW	SHA	TRI	MAD	AAS	KER	PHO; 9		
2025	Kole Raz	76	Ford	KER	PHO; 6	TUC	CNS	KER	SON	TRI	PIR	AAS	MAD	LVS	PHO	-*	-*
