= Daniel Dye =

American racing driver (born 2003)

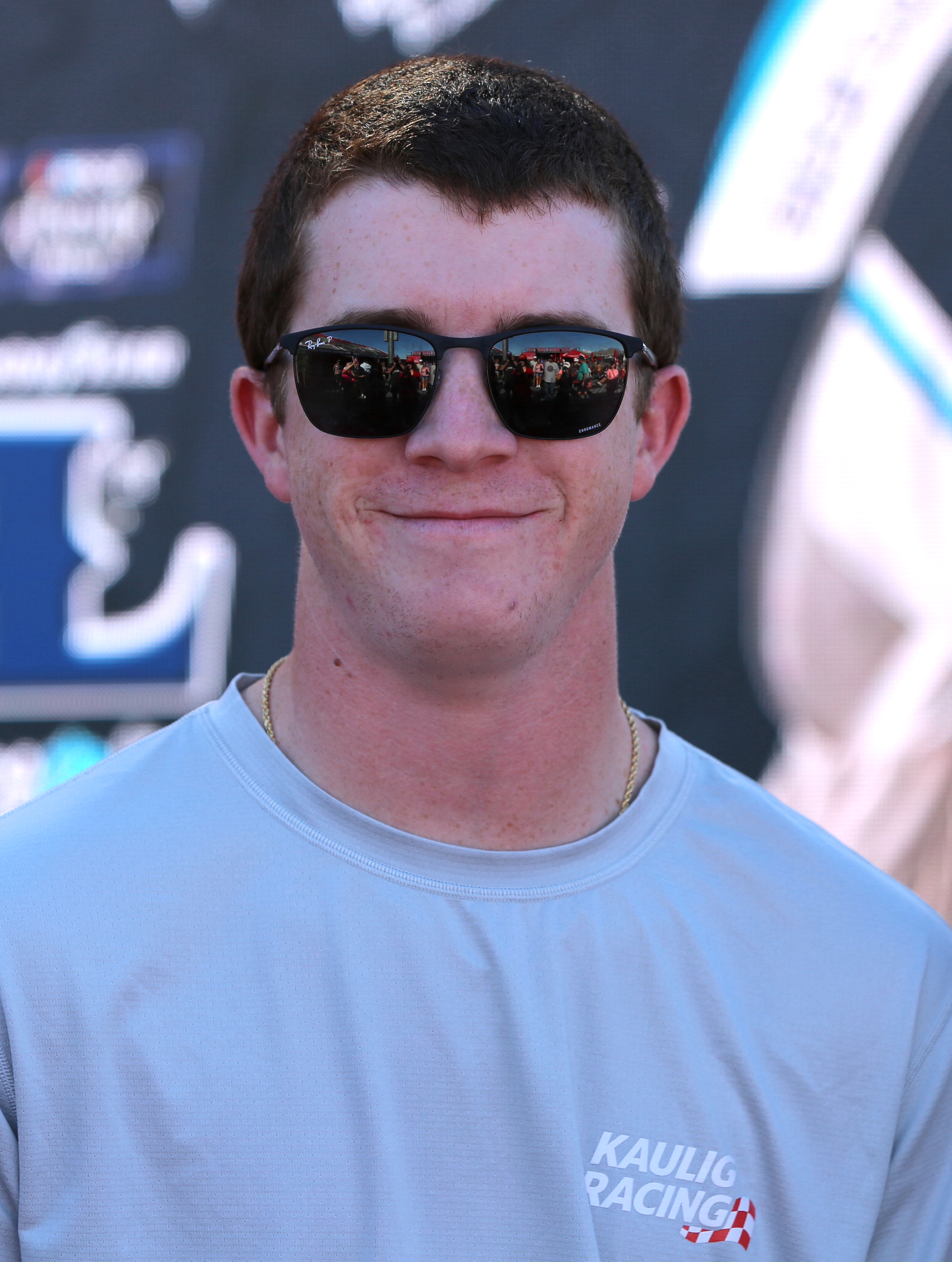
- Dye in 2025
- Born: Daniel Wayne Dye; December 4, 2003 (age 22); DeLand, Florida, U.S.

NASCAR Cup Series career
- 5 races run over 1 year
- 2026 position: 50th
- Best finish: 50th (2026)
- First race: 2026 Jack Link's 500 (Talladega)
- Last race: 2026 YellaWood 500 (Talladega)
Wins	Top tens	Poles
0	0	0

NASCAR O'Reilly Auto Parts Series career
- 52 races run over 4 years
- Car no., team: No. 32 (Jordan Anderson Racing)
- 2026 position: 80th
- Best finish: 20th (2025)
- First race: 2023 Andy's Frozen Custard 300 (Texas)
- Last race: 2026 National Debt Relief 250 (Martinsville)
Wins	Top tens	Poles
0	10	0

NASCAR FedEx Freight Truck Series career
- 53 races run over 3 years
- 2026 position: 30th
- Best finish: 10th (2024)
- First race: 2023 NextEra Energy 250 (Daytona)
- Last race: 2026 Ecosave 200 (Charlotte)
Wins	Top tens	Poles
0	11	1

ARCA Menards Series career
- 32 races run over 3 years
- Best finish: 2nd (2022)
- First race: 2021 Menards 250 (Elko)
- Last race: 2026 Ashley Furniture 150 (Chicagoland)
- First win: 2021 Zinsser SmartCoat 200 (Berlin)
Wins	Top tens	Poles
1	26	2

ARCA Menards Series East career
- 13 races run over 3 years
- Best finish: 2nd (2021)
- First race: 2020 Skip's Western Outfitters 175 (New Smyrna)
- Last race: 2022 Bush's Beans 200 (Bristol)
Wins	Top tens	Poles
0	10	0

ARCA Menards Series West career
- 3 races run over 2 years
- Best finish: 36th (2022)
- First race: 2021 Arizona Lottery 100 (Phoenix)
- Last race: 2022 Portland 112 (Portland)
Wins	Top tens	Poles
0	2	1
- Statistics up to date as of November 8, 2026.

Daniel Wayne Dye (born December 4, 2003) is an American professional stock car racing driver who competes full-time in the NASCAR O'Reilly Auto Parts Series, driving the No. 32 Chevrolet Camaro SS for Jordan Anderson Racing. He has previously competed in the NASCAR Cup Series, the NASCAR Craftsman Truck Series, and the ARCA Menards Series.

== Racing career ==
=== ARCA Menards Series East ===
==== 2020–2021 ====
Dye first raced in the ARCA Menards Series East in 2020, driving the No. 43 for Ben Kennedy Racing. Dye would race two races that season, retiring at New Smyrna Speedway and finishing seventh at Five Flags Speedway.

Dye would come back in the 2021 season, this time with a scheduled full-time ride with Ben Kennedy Racing. However, Dye would only compete for four of the scheduled eight races before eventually switching teams. For the last four races of the season, Dye would race the No. 21 for GMS Racing. Dye, combined with his results from Ben Kennedy Racing and GMS Racing, would finish second in the final standings, only being beaten by Sammy Smith.

=== ARCA Menards Series West ===
==== 2021–2022 ====
Dye would first race in the ARCA Menards Series West as a one-off race at Phoenix Raceway, driving the No. 22 for GMS Racing in 2021. He would finish twelfth. In 2022, he ran at Phoenix again in a companion event with the ARCA Menards Series, finishing second.

=== ARCA Menards Series ===
==== 2021 ====
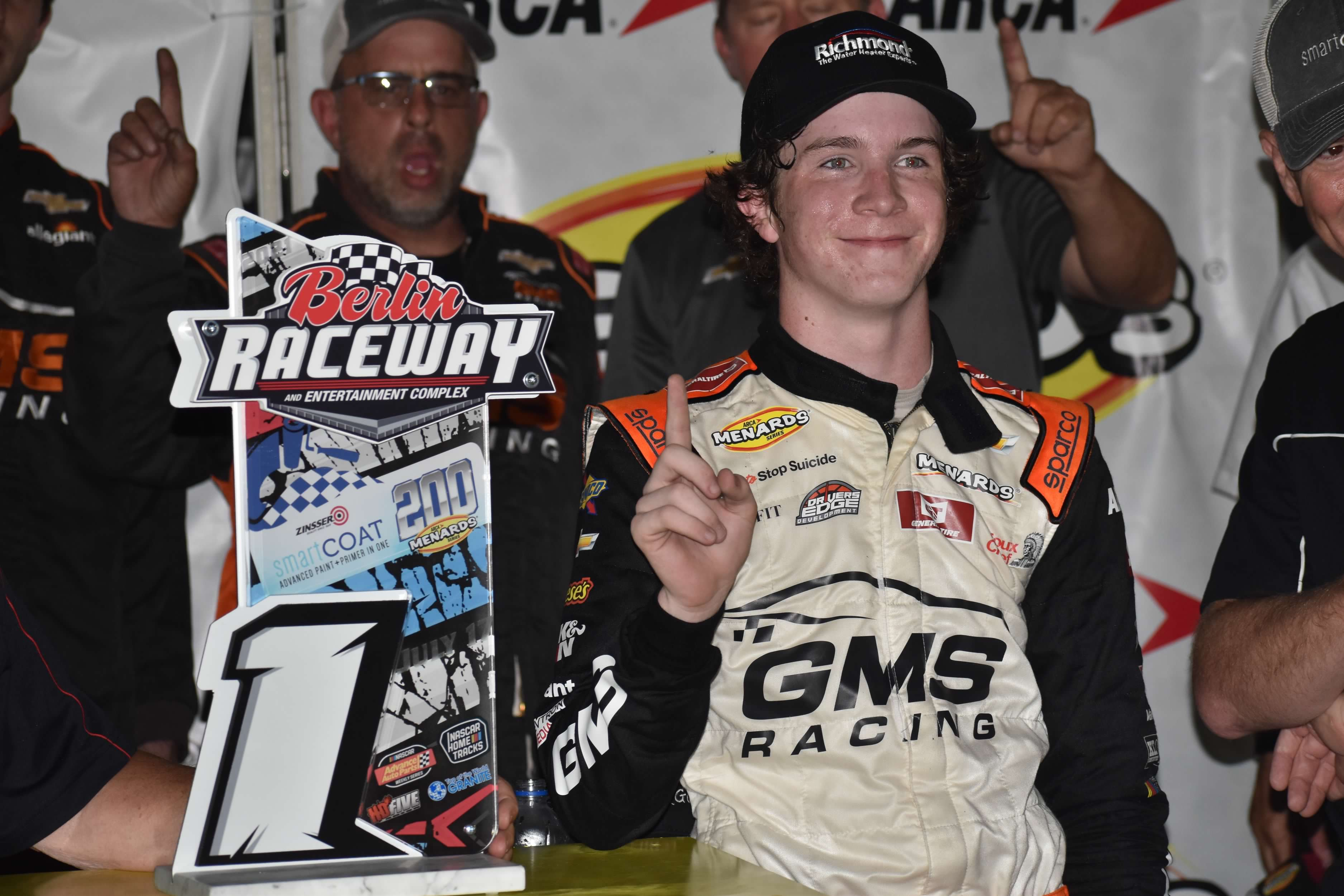
Dye celebrates after winning at Berlin Raceway.

Dye would run a part-time schedule in the ARCA Menards Series in 2021 with GMS Racing, driving the No. 21 along with his full-time schedule in the ARCA Menards Series East. He would run six races in the 2021 season. After a seventh-place finish in his debut at the 2021 Menards 250, Dye would dominate the next race at Berlin Raceway in the 2021 Zinsser SmartCoat 200, scoring his first-ever ARCA Menards Series win in just his second-ever start in the series.

==== 2022 ====
In 2022, he planned to run a full-time schedule for GMS Racing in the No. 43. Dye was instead charged with felony battery after striking a fellow student in the scrotum in what witnesses described as a "game". Dye was indefinitely suspended from ARCA competition after three races. Prior to the race at the Kansas Speedway, Dye was reinstated by ARCA after his charges were dropped from felony to misdemeanor and went on to compete in the event, finishing third. Despite not winning a race, he nearly won the championship until a mechanical issue relegated him to an eighteenth place finish at the season finale in Toledo, which resulted in a runner-up to Nick Sanchez by fourteen points in the final standings. Despite this, he won Rookie of the Year honors ahead of Sanchez's teammate Rajah Caruth.

=== NASCAR Craftsman Truck Series ===
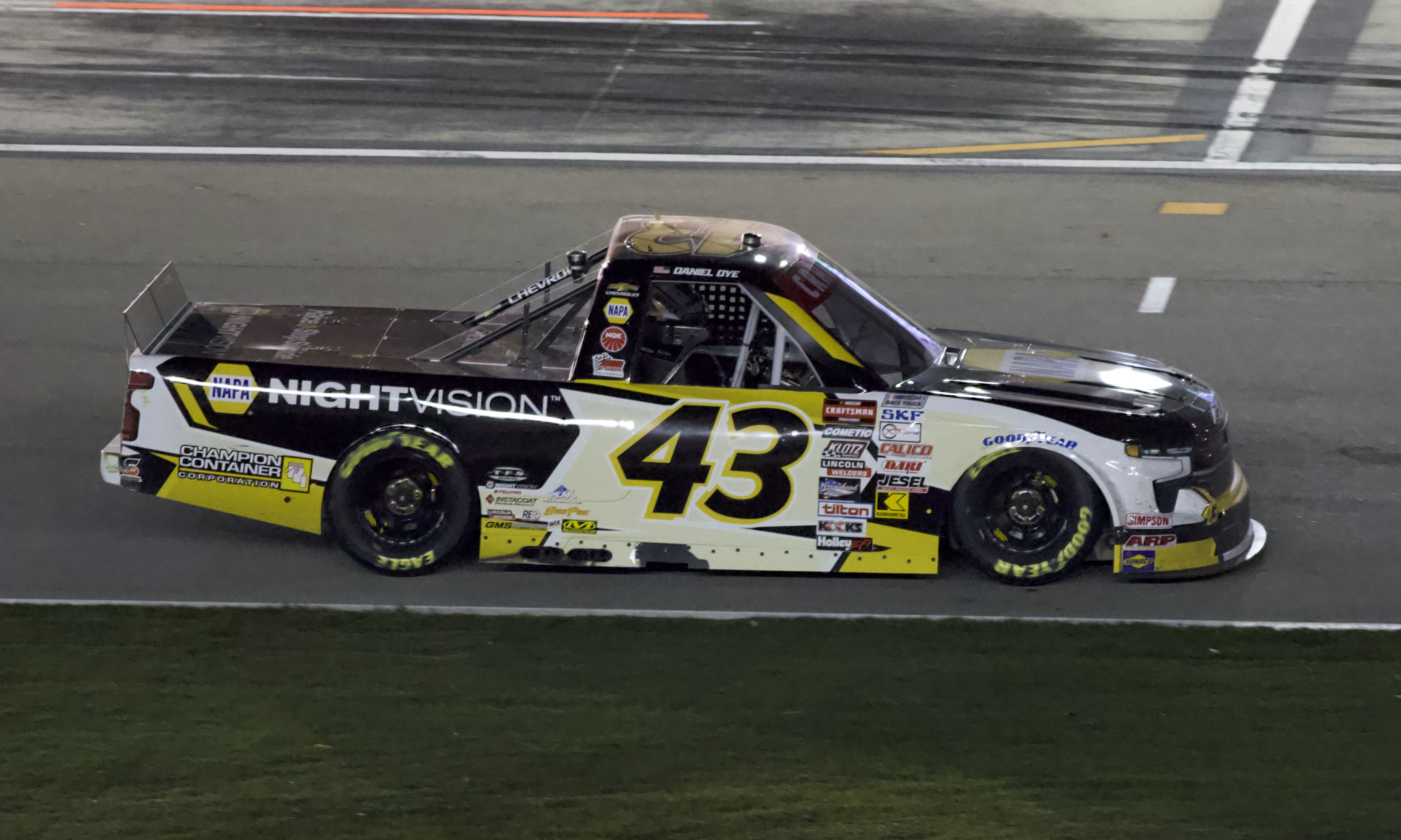
Dye's No. 43 truck at Las Vegas Motor Speedway in 2024.

On October 25, 2022, GMS Racing announced that Dye would compete full-time in the 2023 NASCAR Craftsman Truck Series, making his series debut in the No. 43 Chevrolet Silverado.

On September 27, 2023, Dye signed with McAnally–Hilgemann Racing for 2024. Dye would continue using the No. 43. He finished eighth at Richmond, earning enough points to secure a spot in the Playoffs.

On October 29, 2025, Kaulig Racing announced Dye will join their Ram Trucks team in 2026.

On March 17, 2026, Dye was indefinitely suspended by NASCAR and Kaulig for mocking IndyCar Series driver David Malukas by insinuating that Malukas was homosexual on a Whatnot stream. On March 31, it was announced that Dye was released from Kaulig.

=== NASCAR O'Reilly Auto Parts Series ===
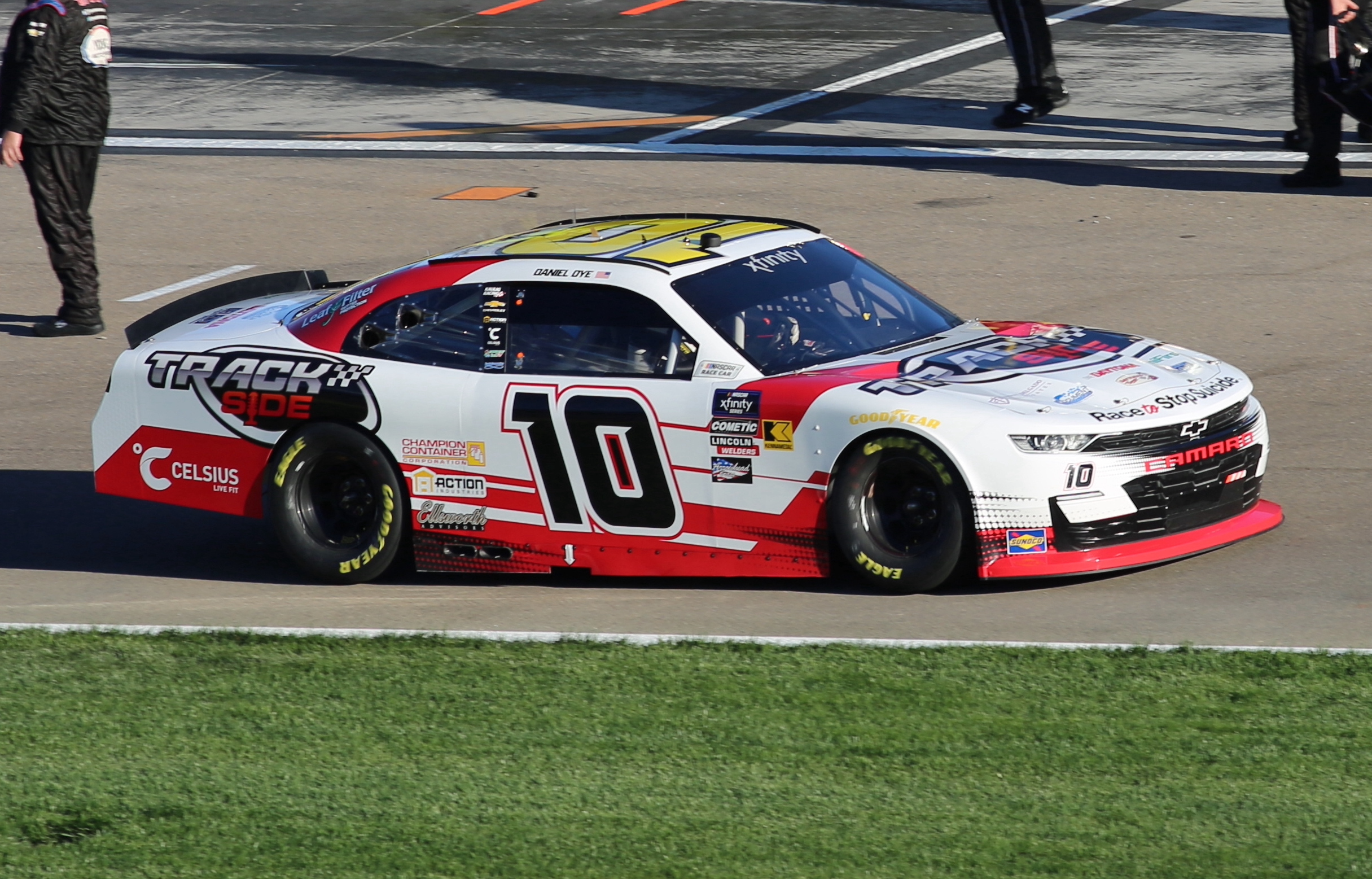
Dye's No. 10 car at Las Vegas Motor Speedway in 2024

On September 17, 2023, it was announced that Dye would run three races in the NASCAR Xfinity Series for Alpha Prime Racing, driving the No. 44 Chevrolet with sponsorship from Champion Container.

In 2024, Dye ran a partial schedule with Kaulig Racing, driving the No. 10 Chevrolet Camaro.

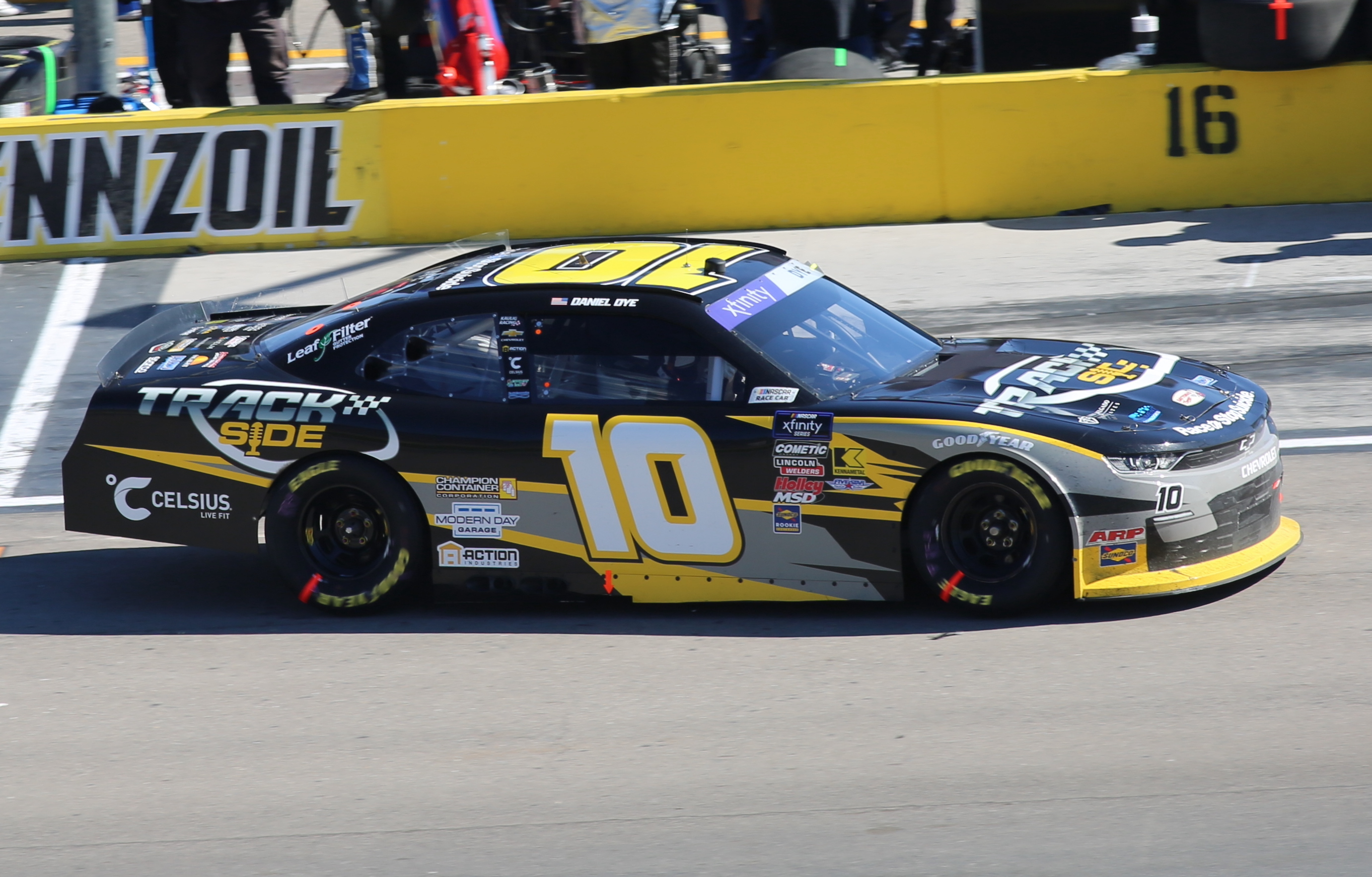
Dye's No. 10 car at Las Vegas Motor Speedway in 2025

On August 23, 2024, Kaulig Racing announced that Dye would pilot the No. 10 full-time in 2025. He had eight top-ten finishes and finished 20th in the final points standings.

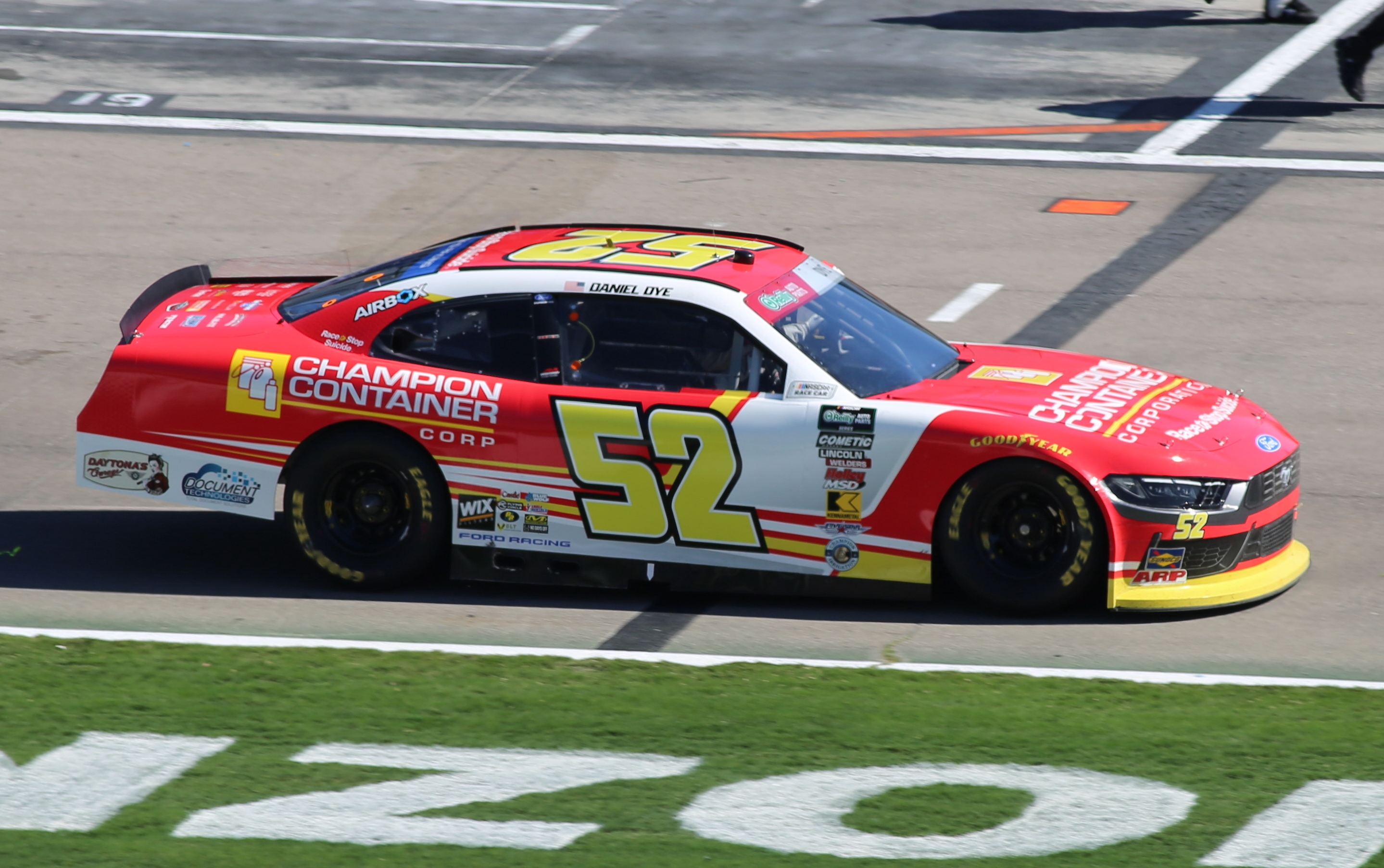
Dye's No. 52 car at Las Vegas Motor Speedway in 2026

In 2026, Dye would drive the No. 52 Ford for AM Racing and Jordan Anderson Racing on a partial schedule.

On August 28, 2026, it was announced that Dye will run full-time for Jordan Anderson Racing in the No. 32 Chevrolet for the 2027 season.

=== NASCAR Cup Series ===
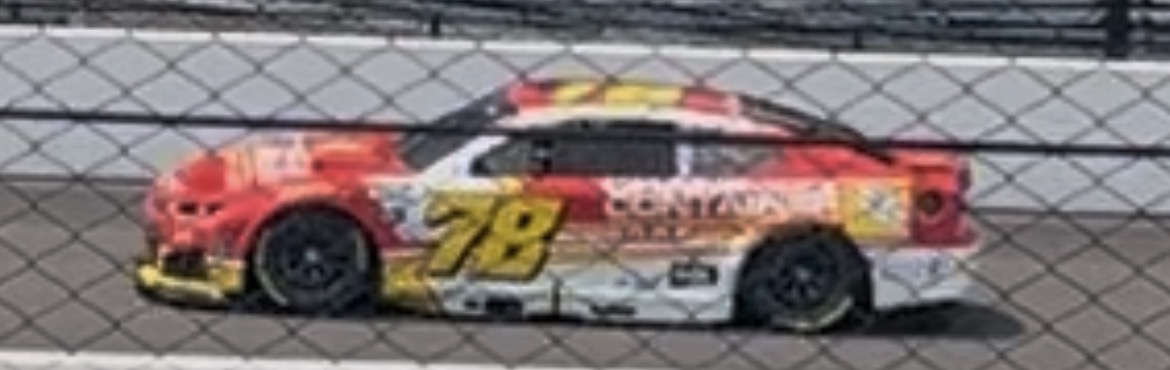
Dye's No. 78 car at Indianapolis Motor Speedway in 2026

On April 20, 2026, it was announced that Dye would run five Cup Series races in 2026, beginning with the upcoming race at Talladega. He also would compete at Pocono and Indianapolis.

== Personal life ==
Dye is a second-generation driver, the son of Stacy Rumbaugh and Randy Dye, a businessman in Daytona Beach, Florida who owns two auto dealerships: Daytona Dodge Chrysler Jeep Ram and Maserati Alfa Romeo of Daytona. Randy Dye was a former Pro Late Model driver who since July 2017 has served on the board of directors for The NASCAR Foundation. He is a cousin of MLB player for the Kansas City Royals, Josh Dye.

=== Philanthropy ===
At the end of 2018 with his Pro Late Model debut on the horizon, he created the Race to Stop Suicide campaign in partnership with The NASCAR Foundation and Halifax Health with help from his father Randy who serves on the board of directors for The NASCAR Foundation.

In October 2019, at fifteen years old, Dye himself raised and donated over $15,000 towards Halifax Health's mental health programs.

=== Controversies ===
Dye attended Father Lopez Catholic High School. While a student at Father Lopez, Dye was arrested on April 26, 2022 and booked in Volusia County Branch Jail on charges of felony battery, later reduced to misdemeanor battery. According to a police report, Dye "began dancing and grinding with his groin and pelvic area near his classmate's face" and then "came up from behind the boy and punched him in the groin", with the victim suffering "a possible ruptured testicle." Dye was granted a deferred prosecution agreement and ordered to complete an eight-hour anger management course, 25 hours of community service, and compensate the victim an undisclosed amount.

On March 17, 2026, Dye was indefinitely suspended by NASCAR and Kaulig Racing for mocking IndyCar Series driver David Malukas by insinuating that Malukas was homosexual on a Whatnot stream.

== Motorsports career results ==
=== Stock car career summary ===
Season	Series	Team	Races	Wins	Top 5	Top 10	Points	Position
2020	CARS Super Late Model Tour	Ben Kennedy Racing	2	0	1	1	0	NC†
2020	ARCA Menards Series East	Ben Kennedy Racing	2	0	0	1	112	15th
2021	CARS Super Late Model Tour	Ben Kennedy Racing	1	0	0	0	0	NC†
2021	ARCA Menards Series East	Ben Kennedy Racing	4	0	0	4	401	**2nd**
2021	ARCA Menards Series East	GMS Racing	4	0	2	3	401	**2nd**
2021	ARCA Menards Series West	GMS Racing	1	0	0	0	32	51st
2021	ARCA Menards Series	GMS Racing	6	1	3	4	231	18th
2022	ARCA Menards Series West	Bill McAnally Racing	1	0	1	1	84	36th
2022	ARCA Menards Series West	GMS Racing	1	0	1	1	84	36th
2022	ARCA Menards Series East	GMS Racing	3	0	2	2	157	11th
2022	ARCA Menards Series	GMS Racing	20	0	13	16	956	**2nd**
2023	NASCAR Craftsman Truck Series	GMS Racing	23	0	0	1	389	18th
2023	NASCAR Xfinity Series	Alpha Prime Racing	2	0	0	0	0	NC†
2024	NASCAR Craftsman Truck Series	McAnally–Hilgemann Racing	23	0	2	9	2141	10th
2024	NASCAR Xfinity Series	Kaulig Racing	10	0	0	2	0	NC†
2025	NASCAR Xfinity Series	Kaulig Racing	33	0	0	8	604	20th
2026	ARCA Menards Series	SPS Racing	6	0	3	5	221	22nd
2026	NASCAR Craftsman Truck Series	Kaulig Racing	3	0	0	0	150	30th
2026	NASCAR Craftsman Truck Series	McAnally–Hilgemann Racing	4	0	0	1	150	30th
2026	NASCAR O'Reilly Auto Parts Series	AM Racing	3	0	0	0	0	NC†
2026	NASCAR O'Reilly Auto Parts Series	Jordan Anderson Racing	4	0	0	0	0	NC†
2026	NASCAR Cup Series	Live Fast Motorsports	5	0	0	0	0	NC†

=== NASCAR ===
(key) (Bold – Pole position awarded by qualifying time. Italics – Pole position earned by points standings or practice time. * – Most laps led.)

==== Cup Series ====
NASCAR Cup Series results
Year	Team	No.	Make	1	2	3	4	5	6	7	8	9	10	11	12	13	14	15	16	17	18	19	20	21	22	23	24	25	26	27	28	29	30	31	32	33	34	35	36	NCSC	Pts	Ref
2026	Live Fast Motorsports	78	Chevy	DAY	ATL	COA	PHO	LVS	DAR	MAR	BRI	KAN	TAL; 24	TEX	GLN	CLT	NSH	MCH	POC; 29	COR	SON	CHI	ATL	NWS	IND; 38	IOW	RCH	NHA	DAY; 29	DAR	GTW	BRI	KAN	LVS	CLT	PHO	TAL; 25	MAR	HOM	50th	0^{1}	

==== O'Reilly Auto Parts Series ====
NASCAR O'Reilly Auto Parts Series results
Year	Team	No.	Make	1	2	3	4	5	6	7	8	9	10	11	12	13	14	15	16	17	18	19	20	21	22	23	24	25	26	27	28	29	30	31	32	33	NOAPSC	Pts	Ref
2023	Alpha Prime Racing	44	Chevy	DAY	CAL	LVS	PHO	ATL	COA	RCH	MAR	TAL	DOV	DAR	CLT	PIR	SON	NSH	CSC	ATL	NHA	POC	ROA	MCH	IRC	GLN	DAY	DAR	KAN	BRI	TEX; 17	ROV	LVS; 21	HOM	MAR	PHO; PR^{†}	95th	0^{1}	
2024	Kaulig Racing	10	Chevy	DAY; 27	ATL	LVS	PHO	COA	RCH	MAR	TEX; 24	TAL	DOV; 20	DAR	CLT	PIR	SON	IOW; 10	NHA	NSH	CSC	POC; 17	IND; 7	MCH; 34	DAY	DAR	ATL	GLN	BRI	KAN; 34	TAL	ROV	LVS; 12	HOM	MAR	PHO; 17	89th	0^{1}	
2025	Kaulig Racing	10	Chevy	DAY; 38	ATL; 7	COA; 17	PHO; 19	LVS; 12	HOM; 9	MAR; 7	DAR; 17	BRI; 13	CAR; 9	TAL; 10	TEX; 11	CLT; 31	NSH; 38	MXC; 13	POC; 31	ATL; 8	CSC; 19	SON; 32	DOV; 21	IND; 8	IOW; 36	GLN; 17	DAY; 35	PIR; 11	GTW; 10	BRI; 26	KAN; 12	ROV; 36	LVS; 17	TAL; 25	MAR; 33	PHO; 28	20th	604	
2026	AM Racing	52	Ford	DAY; 21	ATL	COA	PHO; 20	LVS; 15	DAR	MAR	CAR	BRI	KAN	TAL	TEX	GLN	DOV	CLT	NSH	POC	COR	SON	CHI	ATL	IND	IOW											80th	0^{1}	
2026	Jordan Anderson Racing	32	Chevy																								DAY; 38	DAR; 27	GTW	BRI	LVS	CLT	PHO	TAL; 33	MAR; 34	HOM	80th	0^{1}	
^{†} – Replaced by Leland Honeyman before qualifying.

==== Craftsman Truck Series ====
NASCAR Craftsman Truck Series results
Year	Team	No.	Make	1	2	3	4	5	6	7	8	9	10	11	12	13	14	15	16	17	18	19	20	21	22	23	24	25	NCTC	Pts	Ref
2023	GMS Racing	43	Chevy	DAY; 30	LVS; 19	ATL; 16	COA; 18	TEX; 25	BRD; 22	MAR; 30	KAN; 13	DAR; 19	NWS; 14	CLT; 19	GTW; 11	NSH; 22	MOH; 14	POC; 17	RCH; 21	IRP; 22	MLW; 28	KAN; 23	BRI; 21	TAL; 6	HOM; 21	PHO; 32			18th	389	
2024	McAnally–Hilgemann Racing	43	Chevy	DAY; 21	**ATL**; 9	LVS; 24	BRI; 13	COA; 28	MAR; 13	TEX; 6	KAN; 9	DAR; 23	NWS; 9	CLT; 19	GTW; 12	NSH; 2	POC; 16	IRP; 27	RCH; 8	MLW; 8	BRI; 32	KAN; 27	TAL; 3	HOM; 7	MAR; 32	PHO; 24			10th	2141	
2026	Kaulig Racing	10	Ram	DAY; 17	ATL; 13	STP; 17	DAR	CAR	BRI	TEX	GLN	DOV	CLT																30th	150	
2026	McAnally–Hilgemann Racing	20	Chevy											NSH; 10	MCH; 15	COR	LRP	NWS	IRP	RCH	NHA	BRI	KAN; 15	CLT; 28	PHO	TAL	MAR	HOM	30th	150	

^{*} Season still in progress
^{1} Ineligible for series points

=== ARCA Menards Series ===
(key) (Bold – Pole position awarded by qualifying time. Italics – Pole position earned by points standings or practice time. * – Most laps led.)

ARCA Menards Series results
Year	Team	No.	Make	1	2	3	4	5	6	7	8	9	10	11	12	13	14	15	16	17	18	19	20	AMSC	Pts	Ref
2021	GMS Racing	21	Chevy	DAY	PHO	TAL	KAN	TOL	CLT	MOH	POC	ELK; 7	**BLN**; 1*	IOW; 2	WIN; 13	GLN	MCH	ISF	MLW; 3	DSF	BRI; 12	SLM	KAN	18th	231	
2022	GMS Racing	43	Chevy	DAY; 3	PHO; 2	TAL; 17	KAN; 3	CLT; 6	IOW; 17	**BLN**; 7*	ELK; 5	MOH; 8	POC; 5	IRP; 4	MCH; 3	GLN; 4	ISF; 7	MLW; 3	DSF; 4	KAN; 4	BRI; 5	SLM; 3	TOL; 18	2nd	956	
2026	SPS Racing	24	Ford	DAY; 4	PHO		TAL; 10	GLN	TOL															22nd	221	
2026	SPS Racing	24	Chevy			KAN; 2				MCH; 19	POC; 7	BER	ELK	CHI; 4	LRP	IRP	IOW	ISF	MAD	DSF	SLM	BRI	KAN	22nd	221	

==== ARCA Menards Series East ====
ARCA Menards Series East results
Year	Team	No.	Make	1	2	3	4	5	6	7	8	AMSEC	Pts	Ref
2020	Ben Kennedy Racing	43	Chevy	NSM; 19	TOL	DOV	TOL	BRI	FIF; 7			15th	112	
2021	Ben Kennedy Racing	43	Chevy	NSM; 6	FIF; 9	NSV; 8	DOV; 6					2nd	401	
2021	GMS Racing	21	Chevy					SNM; 6	IOW; 2	MLW; 3	BRI; 12	2nd	401	
2022	GMS Racing	43	Chevy	NSM	FIF	DOV	NSV	IOW; 17	MLW; 3	BRI; 5		11th	157	

==== ARCA Menards Series West ====
ARCA Menards Series West results
Year	Team	No.	Make	1	2	3	4	5	6	7	8	9	10	11	AMSWC	Pts	Ref
2021	GMS Racing	22	Chevy	PHO	SON	IRW	CNS	IRW	PIR	LVS	AAS	PHO; 12			51st	32	
2022	GMS Racing	43	Chevy	PHO; 2	IRW	KCR									36th	84	
2022	Bill McAnally Racing	43	Chevy				**PIR**; 4	SON	IRW	EVG	PIR	AAS	LVS	PHO	36th	84	

=== CARS Super Late Model Tour ===
(key)

CARS Super Late Model Tour results
Year	Team	No.	Make	1	2	3	4	5	6	7	8	CSLMTC	Pts	Ref
2020	Ben Kennedy Racing	43	Chevy	SNM	HCY	JEN	HCY	FCS	BRI; 4	FLC		N/A	0	
2020	Ben Kennedy Racing	43D	Chevy								NSH; 25	N/A	0	
2021	Ben Kennedy Racing	43	Chevy	HCY	GPS	NSH	JEN	HCY	MMS	TCM; 15	SBO	N/A	0	
