= 2025 US Marine Corps 250 =

7th race of the 2025 NASCAR Xfinity Series

Race details
- Race 7 of 33 of the 2025 NASCAR Xfinity Series
- Date: March 29, 2025
- Location: Martinsville Speedway in Ridgeway, Virginia
- Course: Permanent racing facility
- Course length: 0.526 miles (0.847 km)
- Distance: 256 laps, 134 mi (215 km)
- Scheduled distance: 250 laps, 131 mi (211 km)
- Average speed: 54.615 mph (87.894 km/h)

Pole position
Driver	Connor Zilisch	JR Motorsports
- Time: 19.888

Most laps led
Driver	Connor Zilisch	JR Motorsports
- Laps: 100

Winner
No. 21	Austin Hill	Richard Childress Racing

Television in the United States
- Network: The CW
- Announcers: Adam Alexander and Parker Kligerman

Radio in the United States
- Radio: MRN

The 2025 US Marine Corps 250 was the 7th stock car race of the 2025 NASCAR Xfinity Series, and the fifth iteration of the event. The race was held on Saturday, March 29, 2025, at Martinsville Speedway in Ridgeway, Virginia, a 0.526 miles (0.847 km) permanent asphalt paper-clip shaped short track. The race was originally scheduled to be contested over 250 laps, but was increased to 256 laps due to an overtime finish.

In a caution-filled race with a highly controversial finish, Austin Hill, driving for Richard Childress Racing, would steal the win on the final lap after Sammy Smith spun the leader of Taylor Gray in the final turn. Hill snuck through on the inside lane and took the lead to earn his 12th career NASCAR Xfinity Series win, his second of the season, and the 100th Xfinity series win for Richard Childress Racing. After the race, Gray confronted Smith near the infield care center, displeased with the move. Connor Zilisch started on the pole and dominated the majority of the race, winning both stages and leading a race-high 100 laps, before being involved in late race incidents, finishing 28th. To fill out the podium, Sheldon Creed, driving for Haas Factory Team, and Justin Allgaier, driving for JR Motorsports, would finish 2nd and 3rd, respectively.

This was also the second race of the Dash 4 Cash. Drivers eligible for the D4C were Justin Allgaier, Sam Mayer, Austin Hill, and Sheldon Creed, since they were the highest finishing Xfinity regulars following the race at Homestead. Hill claimed the $100K bonus cash after winning the race.

== Report ==
=== Background ===
Martinsville Speedway, the track where the race will be held.

Martinsville Speedway is an International Speedway Corporation-owned NASCAR stock car racing track located in Henry County, in Ridgeway, Virginia, just to the south of Martinsville. At 0.526 miles (0.847 km) in length, it is the shortest track in the NASCAR Cup Series. The track is also one of the first paved oval tracks in NASCAR, being built in 1947 by H. Clay Earles. It is also the only race track that has been on the NASCAR circuit from its beginning in 1948. Along with this, Martinsville is the only NASCAR oval track on the entire NASCAR track circuit to have asphalt surfaces on the straightaways, then concrete to cover the turns.

==== Entry list ====
- (R) denotes rookie driver.

#	Driver	Team	Make
00	Sheldon Creed	Haas Factory Team	Ford
1	Carson Kvapil (R)	JR Motorsports	Chevrolet
2	Jesse Love	Richard Childress Racing	Chevrolet
4	Parker Retzlaff	Alpha Prime Racing	Chevrolet
5	Kris Wright	Our Motorsports	Chevrolet
07	Carson Ware	SS-Green Light Racing	Chevrolet
7	Justin Allgaier	JR Motorsports	Chevrolet
8	Sammy Smith	JR Motorsports	Chevrolet
10	Daniel Dye (R)	Kaulig Racing	Chevrolet
11	Josh Williams	Kaulig Racing	Chevrolet
14	Garrett Smithley	SS-Green Light Racing	Chevrolet
16	Christian Eckes (R)	Kaulig Racing	Chevrolet
17	Corey Day	Hendrick Motorsports	Chevrolet
18	William Sawalich (R)	Joe Gibbs Racing	Toyota
19	Aric Almirola	Joe Gibbs Racing	Toyota
20	Brandon Jones	Joe Gibbs Racing	Toyota
21	Austin Hill	Richard Childress Racing	Chevrolet
24	Patrick Staropoli	Sam Hunt Racing	Toyota
25	Harrison Burton	AM Racing	Ford
26	Dean Thompson (R)	Sam Hunt Racing	Toyota
27	Jeb Burton	Jordan Anderson Racing	Chevrolet
28	Kyle Sieg	RSS Racing	Ford
31	Blaine Perkins	Jordan Anderson Racing	Chevrolet
35	Greg Van Alst	Joey Gase Motorsports	Chevrolet
39	Ryan Sieg	RSS Racing	Ford
41	Sam Mayer	Haas Factory Team	Ford
42	Anthony Alfredo	Young's Motorsports	Chevrolet
44	Brennan Poole	Alpha Prime Racing	Chevrolet
45	Brad Perez	Alpha Prime Racing	Chevrolet
48	Nick Sanchez (R)	Big Machine Racing	Chevrolet
51	Jeremy Clements	Jeremy Clements Racing	Chevrolet
53	Mason Maggio	Joey Gase Motorsports	Ford
54	Taylor Gray (R)	Joe Gibbs Racing	Toyota
66	Tyler Tomassi	MBM Motorsports	Ford
70	Thomas Annunziata	Cope Family Racing	Chevrolet
71	Ryan Ellis	DGM Racing	Chevrolet
74	Dawson Cram	Mike Harmon Racing	Chevrolet
88	Connor Zilisch (R)	JR Motorsports	Chevrolet
91	Myatt Snider	DGM Racing	Chevrolet
99	Matt DiBenedetto	Viking Motorsports	Chevrolet
Official entry list

== Practice ==
For practice, drivers would be separated into two groups, A and B. Both sessions will be 25 minutes long, and was held on Friday, March 28, at 4:30 PM EST. Austin Hill, driving for Richard Childress Racing, would set the fastest time between both sessions, with a lap of 20.557, and a speed of 92.115 mph (148.245 km/h).

Pos.	#	Driver	Team	Make	Time	Speed
1	21	Austin Hill	Richard Childress Racing	Chevrolet	20.557	92.115
2	41	Sam Mayer	Haas Factory Team	Ford	20.578	92.021
3	54	Taylor Gray (R)	Joe Gibbs Racing	Toyota	20.605	91.900
Full practice results

== Qualifying ==
Qualifying was held on Friday, March 28, at 5:35 PM EST. Since Martinsville Speedway is a short track, the qualifying system used is a single-car, two-lap system with one round. Drivers will be on track by themselves and will have two laps to post a qualifying time, and whoever sets the fastest time will win the pole.

Connor Zilisch, driving for JR Motorsports, would score the pole for the race, with a lap of 19.888, and a speed of 95.213 mph (153.230 km/h).

Two drivers failed to qualify: Dawson Cram and Tyler Tomassi.

=== Qualifying results ===
Pos.	#	Driver	Team	Make	Time	Speed
1	88	Connor Zilisch (R)	JR Motorsports	Chevrolet	19.888	95.213
2	1	Carson Kvapil (R)	JR Motorsports	Chevrolet	19.914	95.089
3	21	Austin Hill	Richard Childress Racing	Chevrolet	19.989	94.732
4	2	Jesse Love	Richard Childress Racing	Chevrolet	20.041	94.486
5	25	Harrison Burton	AM Racing	Ford	20.066	94.369
6	7	Justin Allgaier	JR Motorsports	Chevrolet	20.067	94.364
7	20	Brandon Jones	Joe Gibbs Racing	Toyota	20.073	94.336
8	17	Corey Day	Hendrick Motorsports	Chevrolet	20.093	94.242
9	10	Daniel Dye (R)	Kaulig Racing	Chevrolet	20.103	94.195
10	8	Sammy Smith	JR Motorsports	Chevrolet	20.107	94.176
11	54	Taylor Gray (R)	Joe Gibbs Racing	Toyota	20.112	94.153
12	26	Dean Thompson (R)	Sam Hunt Racing	Toyota	20.120	94.115
13	39	Ryan Sieg	RSS Racing	Ford	20.129	94.073
14	18	William Sawalich (R)	Joe Gibbs Racing	Toyota	20.145	93.999
15	19	Aric Almirola	Joe Gibbs Racing	Toyota	20.163	93.915
16	41	Sam Mayer	Haas Factory Team	Ford	20.182	93.826
17	42	Anthony Alfredo	Young's Motorsports	Chevrolet	20.182	93.826
18	00	Sheldon Creed	Haas Factory Team	Ford	20.186	93.808
19	16	Christian Eckes (R)	Kaulig Racing	Chevrolet	20.233	93.590
20	48	Nick Sanchez (R)	Big Machine Racing	Chevrolet	20.276	93.391
21	91	Myatt Snider	DGM Racing	Chevrolet	20.292	93.318
22	31	Blaine Perkins	Jordan Anderson Racing	Chevrolet	20.334	93.125
23	51	Jeremy Clements	Jeremy Clements Racing	Chevrolet	20.337	93.111
24	71	Ryan Ellis	DGM Racing	Chevrolet	20.373	92.947
25	70	Thomas Annunziata	Cope Family Racing	Chevrolet	20.376	92.933
26	11	Josh Williams	Kaulig Racing	Chevrolet	20.392	92.860
27	4	Parker Retzlaff	Alpha Prime Racing	Chevrolet	20.404	92.805
28	99	Matt DiBenedetto	Viking Motorsports	Chevrolet	20.410	92.778
29	44	Brennan Poole	Alpha Prime Racing	Chevrolet	20.451	92.592
30	5	Kris Wright	Our Motorsports	Chevrolet	20.534	92.218
31	53	Mason Maggio	Joey Gase Motorsports	Ford	20.575	92.034
32	45	Brad Perez	Alpha Prime Racing	Chevrolet	20.577	92.025
Qualified by owner's points
33	24	Patrick Staropoli	Sam Hunt Racing	Toyota	20.684	91.549
34	14	Garrett Smithley	SS-Green Light Racing	Chevrolet	20.720	91.390
35	28	Kyle Sieg	RSS Racing	Ford	20.725	91.368
36	35	Greg Van Alst	Joey Gase Motorsports	Chevrolet	20.871	90.729
37	07	Carson Ware	SS-Green Light Racing	Chevrolet	20.951	90.382
38	27	Jeb Burton	Jordan Anderson Racing	Chevrolet	–	–
Failed to qualify
39	74	Dawson Cram	Mike Harmon Racing	Chevrolet	21.070	89.872
40	66	Tyler Tomassi	MBM Motorsports	Ford	21.159	89.494
Official qualifying results
Official starting lineup

== Race results ==
Stage 1 Laps: 60

Pos.	#	Driver	Team	Make	Pts
1	88	Connor Zilisch (R)	JR Motorsports	Chevrolet	10
2	1	Carson Kvapil (R)	JR Motorsports	Chevrolet	9
3	20	Brandon Jones	Joe Gibbs Racing	Toyota	8
4	7	Justin Allgaier	JR Motorsports	Chevrolet	7
5	19	Aric Almirola	Joe Gibbs Racing	Toyota	6
6	54	Taylor Gray (R)	Joe Gibbs Racing	Toyota	5
7	21	Austin Hill	Richard Childress Racing	Chevrolet	4
8	8	Sammy Smith	JR Motorsports	Chevrolet	3
9	16	Christian Eckes (R)	Kaulig Racing	Chevrolet	2
10	26	Dean Thompson (R)	Sam Hunt Racing	Toyota	1

Stage 2 Laps: 60

Pos.	#	Driver	Team	Make	Pts
1	88	Connor Zilisch (R)	JR Motorsports	Chevrolet	10
2	1	Carson Kvapil (R)	JR Motorsports	Chevrolet	9
3	18	William Sawalich (R)	Joe Gibbs Racing	Toyota	8
4	10	Daniel Dye (R)	Kaulig Racing	Chevrolet	7
5	48	Nick Sanchez (R)	Big Machine Racing	Chevrolet	6
6	19	Aric Almirola	Joe Gibbs Racing	Toyota	5
7	11	Josh Williams	Kaulig Racing	Chevrolet	4
8	7	Justin Allgaier	JR Motorsports	Chevrolet	3
9	54	Taylor Gray (R)	Joe Gibbs Racing	Toyota	2
10	31	Blaine Perkins	Jordan Anderson Racing	Chevrolet	1

Stage 3 Laps: 136

Fin	St	#	Driver	Team	Make	Laps	Led	Status	Pts
1	3	21	Austin Hill	Richard Childress Racing	Chevrolet	256	1	Running	44
2	18	00	Sheldon Creed	Haas Factory Team	Ford	256	2	Running	35
3	6	7	Justin Allgaier	JR Motorsports	Chevrolet	256	5	Running	44
4	29	44	Brennan Poole	Alpha Prime Racing	Chevrolet	256	0	Running	33
5	16	41	Sam Mayer	Haas Factory Team	Ford	256	0	Running	32
6	12	26	Dean Thompson (R)	Sam Hunt Racing	Toyota	256	0	Running	32
7	9	10	Daniel Dye (R)	Kaulig Racing	Chevrolet	256	0	Running	37
8	13	39	Ryan Sieg	RSS Racing	Ford	256	0	Running	29
9	30	5	Kris Wright	Our Motorsports	Chevrolet	256	0	Running	28
10	10	8	Sammy Smith	JR Motorsports	Chevrolet	256	6	Running	31
11	38	27	Jeb Burton	Jordan Anderson Racing	Chevrolet	256	0	Running	26
12	27	4	Parker Retzlaff	Alpha Prime Racing	Chevrolet	256	0	Running	25
13	15	19	Aric Almirola	Joe Gibbs Racing	Toyota	256	7	Running	35
14	23	51	Jeremy Clements	Jeremy Clements Racing	Chevrolet	256	0	Running	23
15	34	14	Garrett Smithley	SS-Green Light Racing	Chevrolet	256	0	Running	22
16	33	24	Patrick Staropoli	Sam Hunt Racing	Toyota	256	0	Running	21
17	26	11	Josh Williams	Kaulig Racing	Chevrolet	256	0	Running	24
18	24	71	Ryan Ellis	DGM Racing	Chevrolet	256	0	Running	19
19	22	31	Blaine Perkins	Jordan Anderson Racing	Chevrolet	256	0	Running	19
20	2	1	Carson Kvapil (R)	JR Motorsports	Chevrolet	256	0	Running	35
21	8	17	Corey Day	Hendrick Motorsports	Chevrolet	256	0	Running	16
22	7	20	Brandon Jones	Joe Gibbs Racing	Toyota	256	22	Running	23
23	32	45	Brad Perez	Alpha Prime Racing	Chevrolet	256	0	Running	14
24	5	25	Harrison Burton	AM Racing	Ford	256	0	Running	13
25	31	53	Mason Maggio	Joey Gase Motorsports	Ford	256	0	Running	12
26	28	99	Matt DiBenedetto	Viking Motorsports	Chevrolet	256	0	Running	11
27	14	18	William Sawalich (R)	Joe Gibbs Racing	Toyota	256	4	Running	18
28	1	88	Connor Zilisch (R)	JR Motorsports	Chevrolet	256	100	Running	29
29	11	54	Taylor Gray (R)	Joe Gibbs Racing	Toyota	256	87	Running	15
30	37	07	Carson Ware	SS-Green Light Racing	Chevrolet	254	0	Running	7
31	25	70	Thomas Annunziata	Cope Family Racing	Chevrolet	252	0	Running	6
32	20	48	Nick Sanchez (R)	Big Machine Racing	Chevrolet	232	0	Accident	11
33	21	91	Myatt Snider	DGM Racing	Chevrolet	232	0	Accident	4
34	19	16	Christian Eckes (R)	Kaulig Racing	Chevrolet	231	22	Accident	5
35	35	28	Kyle Sieg	RSS Racing	Ford	231	0	Accident	2
36	36	35	Greg Van Alst	Joey Gase Motorsports	Chevrolet	229	0	Running	1
37	4	2	Jesse Love	Richard Childress Racing	Chevrolet	216	0	Accident	1
38	17	42	Anthony Alfredo	Young's Motorsports	Chevrolet	110	0	Engine	1
Official race results

== Standings after the race ==
Drivers' Championship standings

	Pos	Driver	Points
	1	Justin Allgaier	293
	2	Sam Mayer	252 (–41)
1	3	Austin Hill	246 (–47)
1	4	Sheldon Creed	222 (–71)
2	5	Jesse Love	219 (–74)
	6	Sammy Smith	215 (–78)
	7	Connor Zilisch	193 (–100)
1	8	Aric Almirola	186 (–107)
1	9	Ryan Sieg	185 (–108)
4	10	Carson Kvapil	176 (–117)
1	11	Jeb Burton	169 (–124)
4	12	Daniel Dye	168 (–125)
Official driver's standings

Manufacturers' Championship standings

Pos	Manufacturer	Points
1	Chevrolet	275
2	Toyota	232 (–43)
3	Ford	231 (–44)

- Note: Only the first 12 positions are included for the driver standings.

Previous race: 2025 Hard Rock Bet 300	NASCAR Xfinity Series; 2025 season	Next race: 2025 Sport Clips Haircuts VFW 200
