= 2024 Wawa 250 =

22nd race of the 2024 NASCAR Xfinity Series

2024 Wawa 250 Powered by Coca-Cola
Race details
- Race 22 of 33 of the 2024 NASCAR Xfinity Series
- Date: August 23, 2024
- Official name: 23rd Annual Wawa 250 Powered by Coca-Cola
- Location: Daytona International Speedway in Daytona Beach, Florida
- Course: Permanent racing facility
- Course length: 2.5 miles (4.0 km)
- Distance: 102 laps, 255 mi (410 km)
- Scheduled distance: 100 laps, 250 mi (400 km)
- Average speed: 117.182 mph (188.586 km/h)

Pole position
Driver	Chandler Smith	Joe Gibbs Racing
- Time: 49.672

Most laps led
Driver	A. J. Allmendinger	Kaulig Racing
- Laps: 35

Winner
No. 20	Ryan Truex	Joe Gibbs Racing

Television in the United States
- Network: USA
- Announcers: Rick Allen, Steve Letarte, and Jeff Burton

Radio in the United States
- Radio: MRN

The 2024 Wawa 250 Powered by Coca-Cola was the 22nd stock car race of the 2024 NASCAR Xfinity Series, and the 23rd iteration of the event. The race was held on Friday, August 23, 2024, at Daytona International Speedway in Daytona Beach, Florida, a 2.5 miles (4.0 km) permanent quad-oval shaped superspeedway. The race was originally scheduled to be contested over 100 laps, but was extended to 102 laps due to an overtime finish. Ryan Truex, driving for Joe Gibbs Racing, would stay consistent throughout the race, leading 28 laps and winning after leading when A. J. Allmendinger spun on the final lap, bringing out the caution. This was Truex's third career NASCAR Xfinity Series win, and his second of the season. Allmendinger led a race-high 35 laps before getting spun by Parker Kligerman on the final lap, officially credited with a 24th place finish. Justin Allgaier won both stages and led 16 laps, finishing 7th and taking the regular season points lead away from Cole Custer. To fill out the podium, Chandler Smith, driving for Joe Gibbs Racing, and Parker Kligerman, driving for Big Machine Racing, would finish 2nd and 3rd, respectively.

== Report ==
=== Background ===
Daytona International Speedway, the circuit where the race was held.

The race was held at Daytona International Speedway, a race track located in Daytona Beach, Florida, United States. Since its opening in 1959, the track has been the home of the Daytona 500, the most prestigious race in NASCAR. In addition to NASCAR, the track also hosts ARCA, AMA Superbike, USCC, SCCA, and Motocross races. It features multiple layouts including the primary 2.5 miles (4.0 km) high speed tri-oval, a 3.56 miles (5.73 km) sports car course, a 2.95 miles (4.75 km) motorcycle course, and a .25 miles (0.40 km) karting and motorcycle flat-track. The track's 180-acre (73 ha) infield includes the 29-acre (12 ha) Lake Lloyd, which has hosted powerboat racing. The speedway is owned and operated by International Speedway Corporation.

The track was built in 1959 by NASCAR founder William "Bill" France, Sr. to host racing held at the former Daytona Beach Road Course. His banked design permitted higher speeds and gave fans a better view of the cars. Lights were installed around the track in 1998 and today, it is the third-largest single lit outdoor sports facility. The speedway has been renovated three times, with the infield renovated in 2004 and the track repaved twice — in 1978 and in 2010. On January 22, 2013, the track unveiled artist depictions of a renovated speedway. On July 5 of that year, ground was broken for a project that would remove the backstretch seating and completely redevelop the frontstretch seating. The renovation to the speedway was done by Rossetti Architects. The project, named "Daytona Rising", was completed in January 2016, at a cost of US $400 million, placing emphasis on improving fan experience with five expanded and redesigned fan entrances (called "injectors") as well as wider and more comfortable seating with more restrooms and concession stands. After the renovations, the track's grandstands included 101,000 permanent seats with the ability to increase permanent seating to 125,000. The project was completed before the start of Speedweeks.

==== Entry list ====
- (R) denotes rookie driver.
- (i) denotes driver who is ineligible for series driver points.

#	Driver	Team	Make
00	Cole Custer	Stewart–Haas Racing	Ford
1	Sam Mayer	JR Motorsports	Chevrolet
2	Jesse Love (R)	Richard Childress Racing	Chevrolet
5	Anthony Alfredo	Our Motorsports	Chevrolet
07	Patrick Emerling	SS-Green Light Racing	Chevrolet
7	Justin Allgaier	JR Motorsports	Chevrolet
8	Sammy Smith	JR Motorsports	Chevrolet
9	Brandon Jones	JR Motorsports	Chevrolet
11	Josh Williams	Kaulig Racing	Chevrolet
14	C. J. McLaughlin	SS-Green Light Racing	Chevrolet
15	Gus Dean	AM Racing	Ford
16	A. J. Allmendinger	Kaulig Racing	Chevrolet
18	Sheldon Creed	Joe Gibbs Racing	Toyota
19	Joe Graf Jr.	Joe Gibbs Racing	Toyota
20	Ryan Truex	Joe Gibbs Racing	Toyota
21	Austin Hill	Richard Childress Racing	Chevrolet
26	Jeffrey Earnhardt (i)	Sam Hunt Racing	Toyota
27	Jeb Burton	Jordan Anderson Racing	Chevrolet
28	Kyle Sieg	RSS Racing	Ford
29	Blaine Perkins	RSS Racing	Ford
31	Parker Retzlaff	Jordan Anderson Racing	Chevrolet
32	Jordan Anderson	Jordan Anderson Racing	Chevrolet
35	Akinori Ogata (i)	Joey Gase Motorsports	Chevrolet
38	Matt DiBenedetto	RSS Racing	Ford
39	Ryan Sieg	RSS Racing	Ford
42	Leland Honeyman (R)	Young's Motorsports	Chevrolet
43	Ryan Ellis	Alpha Prime Racing	Chevrolet
44	Brennan Poole	Alpha Prime Racing	Chevrolet
45	Caesar Bacarella	Alpha Prime Racing	Chevrolet
48	Parker Kligerman	Big Machine Racing	Chevrolet
51	Jeremy Clements	Jeremy Clements Racing	Chevrolet
53	Joey Gase	Joey Gase Motorsports	Ford
74	Tim Viens	Mike Harmon Racing	Chevrolet
81	Chandler Smith	Joe Gibbs Racing	Toyota
91	Kyle Weatherman	DGM Racing	Chevrolet
92	Josh Bilicki	DGM Racing	Chevrolet
97	Shane van Gisbergen (R)	Kaulig Racing	Chevrolet
98	Riley Herbst	Stewart–Haas Racing	Ford
Official entry list

== Qualifying ==
Qualifying was held on Friday, August 23, at 3:00 PM EST. Since Daytona International Speedway is a superspeedway, the qualifying system used is a single-car, single-lap system with two rounds. In the first round, drivers will have one lap to set a time to determine positions 11-38. The fastest ten drivers from the first round move on to the second round, to determine positions 1-10. Whoever sets the fastest time in Round 2 will win the pole.

The second round of qualifying was cancelled due to lightning strikes in the area. The starting lineup will be determined by speeds in the first round. Chandler Smith, driving for Joe Gibbs Racing, would score the pole for the race, with a lap of 49.672, and a speed of 181.189 mph (291.595 km/h).

No drivers would fail to qualify.

=== Qualifying results ===
Pos.	#	Driver	Team	Make	Time	Speed
1	81	Chandler Smith	Joe Gibbs Racing	Toyota	49.672	181.189
2	21	Austin Hill	Richard Childress Racing	Chevrolet	49.690	181.123
3	16	A. J. Allmendinger	Kaulig Racing	Chevrolet	49.710	181.050
4	19	Joe Graf Jr.	Joe Gibbs Racing	Toyota	49.736	180.955
5	2	Jesse Love (R)	Richard Childress Racing	Chevrolet	49.775	180.814
6	20	Ryan Truex	Joe Gibbs Racing	Toyota	49.794	180.745
7	18	Sheldon Creed	Joe Gibbs Racing	Toyota	49.825	180.632
8	98	Riley Herbst	Stewart–Haas Racing	Ford	49.832	180.607
9	5	Anthony Alfredo	Our Motorsports	Chevrolet	49.838	180.585
10	11	Josh Williams	DGM Racing	Chevrolet	49.845	180.560
11	7	Justin Allgaier	JR Motorsports	Chevrolet	49.866	180.484
12	48	Parker Kligerman	Big Machine Racing	Chevrolet	49.960	180.144
13	51	Jeremy Clements	Jeremy Clements Racing	Chevrolet	49.988	180.043
14	00	Cole Custer	Stewart–Haas Racing	Ford	50.030	179.892
15	31	Parker Retzlaff	Jordan Anderson Racing	Chevrolet	50.053	179.809
16	9	Brandon Jones	JR Motorsports	Chevrolet	50.059	179.788
17	45	Caesar Bacarella	Alpha Prime Racing	Chevrolet	50.088	179.684
18	91	Kyle Weatherman	DGM Racing	Chevrolet	50.126	179.548
19	97	Shane van Gisbergen (R)	Kaulig Racing	Chevrolet	50.136	179.512
20	42	Leland Honeyman (R)	Young's Motorsports	Chevrolet	50.137	179.508
21	27	Jeb Burton	Jordan Anderson Racing	Chevrolet	50.142	179.490
22	26	Jeffrey Earnhardt (i)	Sam Hunt Racing	Toyota	50.162	179.419
23	07	Patrick Emerling	SS-Green Light Racing	Chevrolet	50.176	179.369
24	8	Sammy Smith	JR Motorsports	Chevrolet	50.205	179.265
25	32	Jordan Anderson	Jordan Anderson Racing	Chevrolet	50.205	179.265
26	39	Ryan Sieg	RSS Racing	Ford	50.207	179.258
27	15	Gus Dean	AM Racing	Ford	50.269	179.037
28	38	Matt DiBenedetto	RSS Racing	Ford	50.301	178.923
29	29	Blaine Perkins	RSS Racing	Ford	50.329	178.823
30	14	C. J. McLaughlin	SS-Green Light Racing	Chevrolet	50.342	178.777
31	44	Brennan Poole	Alpha Prime Racing	Chevrolet	50.348	178.756
32	35	Akinori Ogata (i)	Joey Gase Motorsports	Chevrolet	50.355	178.731
33	92	Josh Bilicki	DGM Racing	Chevrolet	50.468	178.331
Qualified by owner's points
34	28	Kyle Sieg	RSS Racing	Ford	50.654	177.676
35	53	Joey Gase	Joey Gase Motorsports	Ford	50.741	177.371
36	43	Ryan Ellis	Alpha Prime Racing	Chevrolet	51.201	175.778
37	74	Tim Viens	Mike Harmon Racing	Chevrolet	52.820	170.390
38	1	Sam Mayer	JR Motorsports	Chevrolet	59.348	151.648
Official qualifying results
Official starting lineup

== Race results ==
Stage 1 Laps: 30

Pos.	#	Driver	Team	Make	Pts
1	7	Justin Allgaier	JR Motorsports	Chevrolet	10
2	81	Chandler Smith	Joe Gibbs Racing	Toyota	9
3	16	A. J. Allmendinger	Kaulig Racing	Chevrolet	8
4	18	Sheldon Creed	Joe Gibbs Racing	Toyota	7
5	48	Parker Kligerman	Big Machine Racing	Chevrolet	6
6	20	Ryan Truex	Joe Gibbs Racing	Toyota	5
7	5	Anthony Alfredo	Our Motorsports	Chevrolet	4
8	19	Joe Graf Jr.	Joe Gibbs Racing	Toyota	3
9	8	Sammy Smith	JR Motorsports	Chevrolet	2
10	51	Jeremy Clements	Jeremy Clements Racing	Chevrolet	1

Stage 2 Laps: 30

Pos.	#	Driver	Team	Make	Pts
1	7	Justin Allgaier	JR Motorsports	Chevrolet	10
2	98	Riley Herbst	Stewart-Haas Racing	Ford	9
3	20	Ryan Truex	Joe Gibbs Racing	Toyota	8
4	16	A. J. Allmendinger	Kaulig Racing	Chevrolet	7
5	27	Jeb Burton	Jordan Anderson Racing	Chevrolet	6
6	48	Parker Kligerman	Big Machine Racing	Chevrolet	5
7	18	Sheldon Creed	Joe Gibbs Racing	Toyota	4
8	81	Chandler Smith	Joe Gibbs Racing	Toyota	3
9	9	Brandon Jones	JR Motorsports	Chevrolet	2
10	11	Josh Williams	Kaulig Racing	Chevrolet	1

Stage 3 Laps: 50

Pos.	St.	#	Driver	Team	Make	Laps	Led	Status	Pts
1	6	20	Ryan Truex	Joe Gibbs Racing	Toyota	102	28	Running	53
2	1	81	Chandler Smith	Joe Gibbs Racing	Toyota	102	15	Running	47
3	12	48	Parker Kligerman	Big Machine Racing	Chevrolet	102	0	Running	45
4	8	98	Riley Herbst	Stewart–Haas Racing	Ford	102	1	Running	32
5	26	39	Ryan Sieg	RSS Racing	Ford	102	0	Running	32
6	25	32	Jordan Anderson	Jordan Anderson Racing	Chevrolet	102	0	Running	31
7	11	7	Justin Allgaier	JR Motorsports	Chevrolet	102	16	Running	50
8	7	18	Sheldon Creed	Joe Gibbs Racing	Toyota	102	0	Running	40
9	20	42	Leland Honeyman (R)	Young's Motorsports	Chevrolet	102	0	Running	28
10	18	91	Kyle Weatherman	DGM Racing	Chevrolet	102	0	Running	27
11	10	11	Josh Williams	Kaulig Racing	Chevrolet	102	0	Running	27
12	4	19	Joe Graf Jr.	Joe Gibbs Racing	Toyota	102	0	Running	28
13	38	1	Sam Mayer	JR Motorsports	Chevrolet	102	7	Running	24
14	29	29	Blaine Perkins	RSS Racing	Ford	102	0	Running	23
15	34	28	Kyle Sieg	RSS Racing	Ford	102	0	Running	22
16	31	44	Brennan Poole	Alpha Prime Racing	Chevrolet	102	0	Running	21
17	21	27	Jeb Burton	Jordan Anderson Racing	Chevrolet	102	0	Running	26
18	23	07	Patrick Emerling	SS-Green Light Racing	Chevrolet	102	0	Running	19
19	30	14	C. J. McLaughlin	SS-Green Light Racing	Chevrolet	102	0	Running	18
20	35	53	Joey Gase	Joey Gase Motorsports	Ford	102	0	Running	17
21	5	2	Jesse Love (R)	Richard Childress Racing	Chevrolet	102	0	Running	16
22	16	9	Brandon Jones	JR Motorsports	Chevrolet	102	0	Running	17
23	24	8	Sammy Smith	JR Motorsports	Chevrolet	102	0	Running	16
24	3	16	A. J. Allmendinger	Kaulig Racing	Chevrolet	102	35	Running	28
25	19	97	Shane van Gisbergen (R)	Kaulig Racing	Chevrolet	101	0	Running	12
26	9	5	Anthony Alfredo	Our Motorsports	Chevrolet	101	0	Running	15
27	13	51	Jeremy Clements	Jeremy Clements Racing	Chevrolet	101	0	Running	11
28	22	26	Jeffrey Earnhardt (i)	Sam Hunt Racing	Toyota	99	0	Accident	0
29	17	45	Caesar Bacarella	Alpha Prime Racing	Chevrolet	94	0	Accident	8
30	32	92	Josh Bilicki	DGM Racing	Chevrolet	94	0	Accident	7
31	2	21	Austin Hill	Richard Childress Racing	Chevrolet	79	0	DVP	6
32	14	00	Cole Custer	Stewart–Haas Racing	Ford	77	0	Accident	5
33	28	38	Matt DiBenedetto	RSS Racing	Ford	76	0	Accident	4
34	15	31	Parker Retzlaff	Jordan Anderson Racing	Chevrolet	76	0	Accident	3
35	37	74	Tim Viens	Mike Harmon Racing	Chevrolet	15	0	Engine	2
36	27	15	Gus Dean	AM Racing	Ford	4	0	Accident	1
37	36	43	Ryan Ellis	Alpha Prime Racing	Chevrolet	1	0	Accident	1
38	32	35	Akinori Ogata (i)	Joey Gase Motorsports	Chevrolet	0	0	Accident	0
Official race results

== Standings after the race ==
Drivers' Championship standings

	Pos	Driver	Points
1	1	Justin Allgaier	806
1	2	Cole Custer	773 (-33)
1	3	Chandler Smith	731 (–75)
1	4	Austin Hill	704 (–102)
	5	A. J. Allmendinger	674 (–132)
	6	Riley Herbst	665 (–141)
	7	Sheldon Creed	654 (–152)
	8	Jesse Love	620 (–186)
	9	Parker Kligerman	605 (–201)
1	10	Ryan Sieg	576 (–230)
1	11	Sammy Smith	561 (–245)
	12	Shane van Gisbergen	532 (–274)
Official driver's standings

Manufacturers' Championship standings

Pos	Manufacturer	Points
1	Chevrolet	819
2	Toyota	783 (-36)
3	Ford	708 (–111)

- Note: Only the first 12 positions are included for the driver standings.

Previous race: 2024 Cabo Wabo 250	NASCAR Xfinity Series; 2024 season	Next race: 2024 Sport Clips Haircuts VFW 200
