= 2026 Ag-Pro 300 =

NASCAR O'Reilly Auto Parts Series race at Talladega Superspeedway

Race details
- Race 11 of 33 in the 2026 NASCAR O'Reilly Auto Parts Series
- Date: April 25, 2026
- Location: Talladega Superspeedway in Lincoln, Alabama
- Course: Permanent racing facility
- Course length: 2.66 miles (4.28 km)
- Distance: 113 laps, 300.58 mi (483.74 km)
- Average speed: 152.128 miles per hour (244.826 km/h)

Pole position
Driver	Jesse Love	Richard Childress Racing
- Time: 52.525

Most laps led
Driver	Jesse Love	Richard Childress Racing
- Laps: 37

Fastest lap
Driver	Jeremy Clements	Jeremy Clements Racing
- Time: 49.651

Winner
No. 17	Corey Day	Hendrick Motorsports

Television in the United States
- Network: The CW
- Announcers: Adam Alexander, Jamie McMurray, and Parker Kligerman

Radio in the United States
- Radio: MRN
- Booth announcers: Alex Hayden and Mike Bagley
- Turn announcers: Dave Moody (1 & 2), Tim Catalfamo (Backstretch), and Dan Hubbard (3 & 4)

The 2026 Ag-Pro 300 was a NASCAR O'Reilly Auto Parts Series race held on Saturday, April 25, 2026, at Talladega Superspeedway in Lincoln, Alabama. Contested over 113 laps on the 2.66 mile (4.28 km) superspeedway, it was the 11th race of the 2026 NASCAR O'Reilly Auto Parts Series season, and the 35th running of the event.

In a respectively clean race with action-packed racing, Corey Day, driving for Hendrick Motorsports, took advantage of the lead on the final lap after Sam Mayer spun on the backstretch, and took the victory after leading when the caution came out before the start/finish line. This was Day's first career NASCAR O'Reilly Auto Parts Series win. Brent Crews finished second, and Sheldon Creed finished third. Sammy Smith and Jeremy Clements rounded out the top five, while Dean Thompson, Jesse Love, Brandon Jones, Parker Retzlaff, and Austin Green rounded out the top ten.

This was the third of four races for the Dash 4 Cash program. The drivers eligible for the D4C were Taylor Gray, Sheldon Creed, Justin Allgaier, and Jesse Love, since they were the highest finishing O'Reilly Series regulars following the race at Kansas. Creed finished in third and claimed the $100,000 bonus.

== Report ==
=== Background ===
Talladega Superspeedway, the track where the race will be held.

Talladega Superspeedway, formerly known as Alabama International Motor Speedway, is a motorsports complex located north of Talladega, Alabama. It is located on the former Anniston Air Force Base in the small city of Lincoln. A tri-oval, the track was constructed in 1969 by the International Speedway Corporation, a business controlled by the France family. Talladega is most known for its steep banking. The track currently hosts NASCAR's Cup Series, Xfinity Series and Craftsman Truck Series. Talladega is the longest NASCAR oval with a length of 2.66-mile-long (4.28 km) tri-oval like the Daytona International Speedway, which is 2.5-mile-long (4.0 km).

==== Entry list ====
- (R) denotes rookie driver.
- (i) denotes driver who is ineligible for series driver points.

#	Driver	Team	Make
00	Sheldon Creed	Haas Factory Team	Chevrolet
0	Garrett Smithley	SS-Green Light Racing	Chevrolet
1	Carson Kvapil	JR Motorsports	Chevrolet
02	Ryan Ellis	Young's Motorsports	Chevrolet
2	Jesse Love	Richard Childress Racing	Chevrolet
5	J. J. Yeley	Hettinger Racing	Ford
07	Josh Bilicki	SS-Green Light Racing	Chevrolet
7	Justin Allgaier	JR Motorsports	Chevrolet
8	Sammy Smith	JR Motorsports	Chevrolet
17	Corey Day	Hendrick Motorsports	Chevrolet
18	William Sawalich	Joe Gibbs Racing	Toyota
19	Brent Crews (R)	Joe Gibbs Racing	Toyota
20	Brandon Jones	Joe Gibbs Racing	Toyota
21	Austin Hill	Richard Childress Racing	Chevrolet
24	Harrison Burton	Sam Hunt Racing	Toyota
26	Dean Thompson	Sam Hunt Racing	Toyota
27	Jeb Burton	Jordan Anderson Racing	Chevrolet
28	Kyle Sieg	RSS Racing	Chevrolet
31	Blaine Perkins	Jordan Anderson Racing	Chevrolet
32	Tyler Ankrum (i)	Jordan Anderson Racing	Chevrolet
35	Natalie Decker	Joey Gase Motorsports	Chevrolet
38	Patrick Emerling (i)	RSS Racing	Chevrolet
39	Ryan Sieg	RSS Racing	Chevrolet
41	Sam Mayer	Haas Factory Team	Chevrolet
42	David Starr	Young's Motorsports	Chevrolet
44	Brennan Poole	Alpha Prime Racing	Chevrolet
45	Lavar Scott (R)	Alpha Prime Racing	Chevrolet
48	Patrick Staropoli (R)	Big Machine Racing	Chevrolet
51	Jeremy Clements	Jeremy Clements Racing	Chevrolet
54	Taylor Gray	Joe Gibbs Racing	Toyota
55	Joey Gase	Joey Gase Motorsports	Chevrolet
74	Dawson Cram	Mike Harmon Racing	Chevrolet
87	Austin Green	Peterson Racing	Chevrolet
88	Rajah Caruth	JR Motorsports	Chevrolet
91	Mason Maggio	DGM Racing	Chevrolet
92	Josh Williams	DGM Racing	Chevrolet
96	Anthony Alfredo	Viking Motorsports	Chevrolet
99	Parker Retzlaff	Viking Motorsports	Chevrolet
Official entry list

== Qualifying ==
Qualifying was held on Friday, April 24, at 4:30 PM CST. Since Talladega Superspeedway is a superspeedway, the qualifying procedure used was a single-car, single-lap system with two rounds. In the first round, drivers had one lap to set a time and determined positions 11-38. The fastest ten drivers from the first round advanced to the second round, and whoever set the fastest time in Round 2 won the pole and determined the rest of the starting lineup.

Jesse Love, driving for Richard Childress Racing, qualified on pole position, having advanced from the preliminary round and set the fastest time in Round 2, with a lap of 52.525 seconds, and a speed of 182.313 miles per hour (293.404 km/h).

No drivers failed to qualify.

=== Qualifying results ===
Pos.	#	Driver	Team	Make	Time (R1)	Speed (R1)	Time (R2)	Speed (R2)
1	2	Jesse Love	Richard Childress Racing	Chevrolet	52.699	181.711	52.525	182.313
2	41	Sam Mayer	Haas Factory Team	Chevrolet	52.639	181.918	52.567	182.168
3	17	Corey Day	Hendrick Motorsports	Chevrolet	52.680	181.777	52.623	181.974
4	92	Josh Williams	DGM Racing	Chevrolet	52.784	181.419	52.630	181.949
5	00	Sheldon Creed	Haas Factory Team	Chevrolet	52.671	181.808	52.631	181.946
6	21	Austin Hill	Richard Childress Racing	Chevrolet	52.802	181.357	52.652	181.873
7	88	Rajah Caruth	JR Motorsports	Chevrolet	52.761	181.498	52.736	181.584
8	1	Carson Kvapil	JR Motorsports	Chevrolet	52.662	181.839	52.763	181.491
9	96	Anthony Alfredo	Viking Motorsports	Chevrolet	52.780	181.432	52.811	181.326
10	91	Mason Maggio	DGM Racing	Chevrolet	52.817	181.305	52.862	181.151
Eliminated in Round 1
11	7	Justin Allgaier	JR Motorsports	Chevrolet	52.819	181.298	—	—
12	39	Ryan Sieg	RSS Racing	Chevrolet	52.821	181.292	—	—
13	8	Sammy Smith	JR Motorsports	Chevrolet	52.828	181.268	—	—
14	48	Patrick Staropoli (R)	Big Machine Racing	Chevrolet	52.848	181.199	—	—
15	51	Jeremy Clements	Jeremy Clements Racing	Chevrolet	52.867	181.134	—	—
16	18	William Sawalich	Joe Gibbs Racing	Toyota	52.888	181.062	—	—
17	26	Dean Thompson	Sam Hunt Racing	Toyota	52.918	180.959	—	—
18	19	Brent Crews (R)	Joe Gibbs Racing	Toyota	52.927	180.928	—	—
19	99	Parker Retzlaff	Viking Motorsports	Chevrolet	52.934	180.905	—	—
20	42	David Starr	Young's Motorsports	Chevrolet	52.939	180.887	—	—
21	02	Ryan Ellis	Young's Motorsports	Chevrolet	52.956	180.829	—	—
22	20	Brandon Jones	Joe Gibbs Racing	Toyota	52.972	180.775	—	—
23	31	Blaine Perkins	Jordan Anderson Racing	Chevrolet	53.109	180.308	—	—
24	27	Jeb Burton	Jordan Anderson Racing	Chevrolet	53.115	180.288	—	—
25	5	J. J. Yeley	Hettinger Racing	Ford	53.119	180.274	—	—
26	54	Taylor Gray	Joe Gibbs Racing	Toyota	53.131	180.234	—	—
27	38	Patrick Emerling (i)	RSS Racing	Chevrolet	53.140	180.203	—	—
28	28	Kyle Sieg	RSS Racing	Chevrolet	53.146	180.183	—	—
29	55	Joey Gase	Joey Gase Motorsports	Chevrolet	53.159	180.139	—	—
30	24	Harrison Burton	Sam Hunt Racing	Toyota	53.160	180.135	—	—
31	87	Austin Green	Peterson Racing	Chevrolet	53.196	180.014	—	—
32	45	Lavar Scott (R)	Alpha Prime Racing	Chevrolet	53.246	179.844	—	—
Qualified by owner's points
33	32	Tyler Ankrum (i)	Jordan Anderson Racing	Chevrolet	53.307	179.639	—	—
34	44	Brennan Poole	Alpha Prime Racing	Chevrolet	53.408	179.299	—	—
35	07	Josh Bilicki	SS-Green Light Racing	Chevrolet	53.435	179.208	—	—
36	35	Natalie Decker	Joey Gase Motorsports	Chevrolet	53.553	178.814	—	—
37	0	Garrett Smithley	SS-Green Light Racing	Chevrolet	53.565	178.773	—	—
38	74	Dawson Cram	Mike Harmon Racing	Chevrolet	54.478	175.777	—	—
Official qualifying results
Official starting lineup

== Race ==
=== Race results ===
==== Stage results ====
Stage One Laps: 25

Pos.	#	Driver	Team	Make	Pts
1	1	Carson Kvapil	JR Motorsports	Chevrolet	10
2	8	Sammy Smith	JR Motorsports	Chevrolet	9
3	00	Sheldon Creed	Haas Factory Team	Chevrolet	8
4	88	Rajah Caruth	JR Motorsports	Chevrolet	7
5	26	Dean Thompson	Sam Hunt Racing	Toyota	6
6	31	Blaine Perkins	Jordan Anderson Racing	Chevrolet	5
7	41	Sam Mayer	Haas Factory Team	Chevrolet	4
8	24	Harrison Burton	Sam Hunt Racing	Toyota	3
9	2	Jesse Love	Richard Childress Racing	Chevrolet	2
10	51	Jeremy Clements	Jeremy Clements Racing	Chevrolet	1

Stage Two Laps: 25

Pos.	#	Driver	Team	Make	Pts
1	7	Justin Allgaier	JR Motorsports	Chevrolet	10
2	39	Ryan Sieg	RSS Racing	Chevrolet	9
3	00	Sheldon Creed	Haas Factory Team	Chevrolet	8
4	26	Dean Thompson	Sam Hunt Racing	Toyota	7
5	99	Parker Retzlaff	Viking Motorsports	Chevrolet	6
6	1	Carson Kvapil	JR Motorsports	Chevrolet	5
7	24	Harrison Burton	Sam Hunt Racing	Toyota	4
8	51	Jeremy Clements	Jeremy Clements Racing	Chevrolet	3
9	87	Austin Green	Peterson Racing	Chevrolet	2
10	21	Austin Hill	Richard Childress Racing	Chevrolet	1

=== Final Stage results ===
Stage Three Laps: 63

Fin	St	#	Driver	Team	Make	Laps	Led	Status	Pts
1	3	17	Corey Day	Hendrick Motorsports	Chevrolet	113	1	Running	55
2	18	19	Brent Crews (R)	Joe Gibbs Racing	Toyota	113	0	Running	35
3	5	00	Sheldon Creed	Haas Factory Team	Chevrolet	113	7	Running	50
4	13	8	Sammy Smith	JR Motorsports	Chevrolet	113	6	Running	42
5	15	51	Jeremy Clements	Jeremy Clements Racing	Chevrolet	113	0	Running	37
6	17	26	Dean Thompson	Sam Hunt Racing	Toyota	113	0	Running	44
7	1	2	Jesse Love	Richard Childress Racing	Chevrolet	113	37	Running	32
8	22	20	Brandon Jones	Joe Gibbs Racing	Toyota	113	0	Running	29
9	19	99	Parker Retzlaff	Viking Motorsports	Chevrolet	113	0	Running	34
10	31	87	Austin Green	Peterson Racing	Chevrolet	113	5	Running	29
11	25	5	J. J. Yeley	Hettinger Racing	Ford	113	2	Running	26
12	23	31	Blaine Perkins	Jordan Anderson Racing	Chevrolet	113	0	Running	30
13	6	21	Austin Hill	Richard Childress Racing	Chevrolet	113	3	Running	25
14	35	07	Josh Bilicki	SS-Green Light Racing	Chevrolet	113	0	Running	23
15	34	44	Brennan Poole	Alpha Prime Racing	Chevrolet	113	3	Running	22
16	27	38	Patrick Emerling (i)	RSS Racing	Chevrolet	113	0	Running	0
17	10	91	Mason Maggio	DGM Racing	Chevrolet	113	0	Running	20
18	28	28	Kyle Sieg	RSS Racing	Chevrolet	113	0	Running	19
19	29	55	Joey Gase	Joey Gase Motorsports	Chevrolet	113	0	Running	18
20	37	0	Garrett Smithley	SS-Green Light Racing	Chevrolet	113	0	Running	17
21	12	39	Ryan Sieg	RSS Racing	Chevrolet	113	0	Running	25
22	8	1	Carson Kvapil	JR Motorsports	Chevrolet	113	22	Running	30
23	11	7	Justin Allgaier	JR Motorsports	Chevrolet	113	4	Running	24
24	32	45	Lavar Scott (R)	Alpha Prime Racing	Chevrolet	113	1	Running	13
25	2	41	Sam Mayer	Haas Factory Team	Chevrolet	112	8	Accident	16
26	24	27	Jeb Burton	Jordan Anderson Racing	Chevrolet	112	2	Accident	11
27	30	24	Harrison Burton	Sam Hunt Racing	Toyota	112	1	Accident	17
28	16	18	William Sawalich	Joe Gibbs Racing	Toyota	112	0	Running	9
29	26	54	Taylor Gray	Joe Gibbs Racing	Toyota	112	6	Running	8
30	7	88	Rajah Caruth	JR Motorsports	Chevrolet	112	5	Running	14
31	9	96	Anthony Alfredo	Viking Motorsports	Chevrolet	112	0	Running	6
32	33	32	Tyler Ankrum (i)	Jordan Anderson Racing	Chevrolet	112	0	Running	0
33	36	35	Natalie Decker	Joey Gase Motorsports	Chevrolet	112	0	Running	4
34	38	74	Dawson Cram	Mike Harmon Racing	Chevrolet	112	0	Running	3
35	4	92	Josh Williams	DGM Racing	Chevrolet	112	0	Running	2
36	21	02	Ryan Ellis	Young's Motorsports	Chevrolet	111	0	Running	1
37	14	48	Patrick Staropoli (R)	Big Machine Racing	Chevrolet	105	0	Running	1
38	20	42	David Starr	Young's Motorsports	Chevrolet	14	0	Overheating	1
Official race results

=== Race statistics ===
- Lead changes: 38 among 16 different drivers
- Cautions/Laps: 4 for 15 laps
- Red flags: 0
- Time of race: 1 hour, 58 minutes and 33 seconds
- Average speed: 152.128 miles per hour (244.826 km/h)

== Standings after the race ==
Drivers' Championship standings

	Pos	Driver	Points
	1	Justin Allgaier	544
	2	Sheldon Creed	439 (–105)
	3	Jesse Love	403 (–141)
	4	Corey Day	399 (–145)
	5	Brandon Jones	353 (–191)
	6	Sammy Smith	352 (–192)
	7	Carson Kvapil	331 (–213)
	8	Austin Hill	321 (–223)
	9	Taylor Gray	302 (–242)
1	10	Parker Retzlaff	292 (–252)
1	11	William Sawalich	280 (–264)
	12	Rajah Caruth	268 (–276)
Official driver's standings

Manufacturers' Championship standings

Pos	Manufacturer	Points
1	Chevrolet	564
2	Toyota	371 (–193)
3	Ford	182 (–382)

- Note: Only the first 12 positions are included for the driver standings.

Previous race: 2026 Kansas Lottery 300	NASCAR O'Reilly Auto Parts Series; 2026 season	Next race: 2026 Andy's Frozen Custard 340
