= 2026 Andy's Frozen Custard 340 =

NASCAR O'Reilly Auto Parts Series race at Texas Motor Speedway

Race details
- Race 12 of 33 in the 2026 NASCAR O'Reilly Auto Parts Series
- Date: May 2, 2026
- Location: Texas Motor Speedway in Fort Worth, Texas
- Course: Permanent racing facility
- Course length: 1.5 miles (2.198 km)
- Distance: 200 laps, 300 mi (480 km)
- Average speed: 149.522 miles per hour (240.632 km/h)

Pole position
Driver	Justin Allgaier	JR Motorsports
- Time: 28.631

Most laps led
Driver	Kyle Larson	JR Motorsports
- Laps: 93

Fastest lap
Driver	Justin Allgaier	JR Motorsports
- Time: 29.925

Winner
No. 88	Kyle Larson	JR Motorsports

Television in the United States
- Network: The CW
- Announcers: Adam Alexander, Jamie McMurray, and Parker Kligerman

Radio in the United States
- Radio: PRN
- Booth announcers: Brad Gillie and Nick Yeoman
- Turn announcers: Rob Albright (1 & 2) and Pat Patterson (3 & 4)

The 2026 Andy's Frozen Custard 340 was a NASCAR O'Reilly Auto Parts Series race held on Saturday, May 2, 2026, at Texas Motor Speedway in Fort Worth, Texas. Contested over 200 laps on the 1.5 mile (2.4 km) intermediate quad-oval, it was the twelfth race of the 2026 NASCAR O'Reilly Auto Parts Series season, and the 22nd running of the event.

Kyle Larson, driving for JR Motorsports, survived a late restart and held off a fast charging Justin Allgaier in the final laps to earn his 19th career NASCAR O'Reilly Auto Parts Series win, and his second of the season. Larson also dominated the majority of the race, leading a race-high 93 laps. Allgaier finished second, and Sam Mayer finished third. Brent Crews and Parker Retzlaff rounded out the top five, while Sheldon Creed, Austin Hill, Brandon Jones, Jesse Love, and Jeremy Clements rounded out the top ten.

This was the last of four races for the Dash 4 Cash program. The drivers eligible for the D4C were Corey Day, Brent Crews, Sheldon Creed, and Sammy Smith, since they were the highest finishing O'Reilly Series regulars following the race at Talladega. Crews finished in fourth and claimed the $100,000 bonus.

This is also the first O'Reilly Series race without a Ford in the field since the Winston Classic in 1991.

== Report ==
=== Background ===
Texas Motor Speedway, the track where the race was held.

Texas Motor Speedway is a speedway located in the northernmost portion of the U.S. city of Fort Worth, Texas – the portion located in Denton County, Texas. The track measures 1.5 miles (2.4 km) around and is banked 24 degrees in the turns, and is of the oval design, where the front straightaway juts outward slightly. The track layout is similar to Atlanta Motor Speedway and Charlotte Motor Speedway (formerly Lowe's Motor Speedway). The track is owned by Speedway Motorsports, Inc., the same company that owns Atlanta and Charlotte Motor Speedway, as well as the short-track Bristol Motor Speedway.

Andy's Frozen Custard would celebrate their 40th anniversary, in which they changed the name from 300 to 340, the race distance would remain at 300 miles, similar to the 2021 Andy's Frozen Custard 335, in which they celebrated their 35th anniversary.

==== Entry list ====
- (R) denotes rookie driver.
- (i) denotes driver who is ineligible for series driver points.

#	Driver	Team	Make
00	Sheldon Creed	Haas Factory Team	Chevrolet
0	Garrett Smithley	SS-Green Light Racing	Chevrolet
1	Connor Zilisch (i)	JR Motorsports	Chevrolet
02	Ryan Ellis	Young's Motorsports	Chevrolet
2	Jesse Love	Richard Childress Racing	Chevrolet
3	Austin Dillon (i)	Richard Childress Racing	Chevrolet
07	Josh Bilicki	SS-Green Light Racing	Chevrolet
7	Justin Allgaier	JR Motorsports	Chevrolet
8	Sammy Smith	JR Motorsports	Chevrolet
9	Carson Kvapil	JR Motorsports	Chevrolet
17	Corey Day	Hendrick Motorsports	Chevrolet
18	William Sawalich	Joe Gibbs Racing	Toyota
19	Brent Crews (R)	Joe Gibbs Racing	Toyota
20	Brandon Jones	Joe Gibbs Racing	Toyota
21	Austin Hill	Richard Childress Racing	Chevrolet
24	Harrison Burton	Sam Hunt Racing	Toyota
26	Dean Thompson	Sam Hunt Racing	Toyota
27	Jeb Burton	Jordan Anderson Racing	Chevrolet
28	Kyle Sieg	RSS Racing	Chevrolet
31	Blaine Perkins	Jordan Anderson Racing	Chevrolet
32	Rajah Caruth	Jordan Anderson Racing	Chevrolet
35	Dawson Cram	Joey Gase Motorsports	Chevrolet
39	Ryan Sieg	RSS Racing	Chevrolet
41	Sam Mayer	Haas Factory Team	Chevrolet
42	Brad Perez	Young's Motorsports	Chevrolet
44	Brennan Poole	Alpha Prime Racing	Chevrolet
45	Lavar Scott (R)	Alpha Prime Racing	Chevrolet
48	Patrick Staropoli (R)	Big Machine Racing	Chevrolet
51	Jeremy Clements	Jeremy Clements Racing	Chevrolet
53	David Starr	Joey Gase Motorsports	Chevrolet
54	Taylor Gray	Joe Gibbs Racing	Toyota
55	Joey Gase	Joey Gase Motorsports	Chevrolet
87	Austin Green	Peterson Racing	Chevrolet
88	Kyle Larson (i)	JR Motorsports	Chevrolet
91	Mason Maggio	DGM Racing	Chevrolet
92	Josh Williams	DGM Racing	Chevrolet
96	Anthony Alfredo	Viking Motorsports	Chevrolet
99	Parker Retzlaff	Viking Motorsports	Chevrolet
Official entry list

== Practice ==
The first and only practice session was held on Friday, May 1, at 4:00 PM CST, and lasted for 50 minutes.

Justin Allgaier, driving for JR Motorsports, set the fastest time in the session, with a lap of 29.525 seconds, and a speed of 182.896 miles per hour (294.343 km/h).

=== Practice results ===
Pos.	#	Driver	Team	Make	Time	Speed
1	7	Justin Allgaier	JR Motorsports	Chevrolet	29.525	182.896
2	51	Jeremy Clements	Jeremy Clements Racing	Chevrolet	29.582	182.543
3	39	Ryan Sieg	RSS Racing	Chevrolet	29.592	182.482
Full practice results

== Qualifying ==
Qualifying was held on Friday, May 1, at 5:05 PM CST. Since Texas Motor Speedway is an intermediate racetrack, the qualifying procedure used was a single-car, one-lap system with one round. Drivers were on track by themselves and had one lap to post a qualifying time, and whoever set the fastest time won the pole.

Justin Allgaier, driving for JR Motorsports, qualified on pole position with a lap of 28.631 seconds, and a speed of 188.607 miles per hour (303.534 km/h).

No drivers failed to qualify.

=== Qualifying results ===
Pos.	#	Driver	Team	Make	Time	Speed
1	7	Justin Allgaier	JR Motorsports	Chevrolet	28.631	188.607
2	20	Brandon Jones	Joe Gibbs Racing	Toyota	28.712	188.075
3	88	Kyle Larson (i)	JR Motorsports	Chevrolet	28.746	187.852
4	1	Connor Zilisch (i)	JR Motorsports	Chevrolet	28.822	187.357
5	19	Brent Crews (R)	Joe Gibbs Racing	Toyota	28.828	187.318
6	17	Corey Day	Hendrick Motorsports	Chevrolet	28.982	186.323
7	21	Austin Hill	Richard Childress Racing	Chevrolet	28.983	186.316
8	51	Jeremy Clements	Jeremy Clements Racing	Chevrolet	28.991	186.265
9	39	Ryan Sieg	RSS Racing	Chevrolet	29.018	186.091
10	99	Parker Retzlaff	Viking Motorsports	Chevrolet	29.036	185.976
11	00	Sheldon Creed	Haas Factory Team	Chevrolet	29.057	185.842
12	54	Taylor Gray	Joe Gibbs Racing	Toyota	29.061	185.816
13	32	Rajah Caruth	Jordan Anderson Racing	Chevrolet	29.063	185.803
14	9	Carson Kvapil	JR Motorsports	Chevrolet	29.170	185.122
15	8	Sammy Smith	JR Motorsports	Chevrolet	29.196	184.957
16	18	William Sawalich	Joe Gibbs Racing	Toyota	29.202	184.919
17	41	Sam Mayer	Haas Factory Team	Chevrolet	29.282	184.414
18	96	Anthony Alfredo	Viking Motorsports	Chevrolet	29.310	184.237
19	87	Austin Green	Peterson Racing	Chevrolet	29.341	184.043
20	3	Austin Dillon (i)	Richard Childress Racing	Chevrolet	29.352	183.974
21	2	Jesse Love	Richard Childress Racing	Chevrolet	29.364	183.899
22	26	Dean Thompson	Sam Hunt Racing	Toyota	29.426	183.511
23	28	Kyle Sieg	RSS Racing	Chevrolet	29.436	183.449
24	24	Harrison Burton	Sam Hunt Racing	Toyota	29.447	183.380
25	27	Jeb Burton	Jordan Anderson Racing	Chevrolet	29.513	182.970
26	92	Josh Williams	DGM Racing	Chevrolet	29.528	182.877
27	44	Brennan Poole	Alpha Prime Racing	Chevrolet	29.537	182.822
28	48	Patrick Staropoli (R)	Big Machine Racing	Chevrolet	29.541	182.797
29	31	Blaine Perkins	Jordan Anderson Racing	Chevrolet	29.554	182.716
30	91	Mason Maggio	DGM Racing	Chevrolet	29.617	182.328
31	35	Dawson Cram	Joey Gase Motorsports	Chevrolet	29.982	180.108
32	0	Garrett Smithley	SS-Green Light Racing	Chevrolet	30.079	179.527
Qualified by owner's points
33	07	Josh Bilicki	SS-Green Light Racing	Chevrolet	30.105	179.372
34	42	Brad Perez	Young's Motorsports	Chevrolet	30.222	178.678
35	53	David Starr	Joey Gase Motorsports	Chevrolet	30.321	178.094
36	55	Joey Gase	Joey Gase Motorsports	Chevrolet	30.431	177.451
37	45	Lavar Scott (R)	Alpha Prime Racing	Chevrolet	—	—
38	02	Ryan Ellis	Young's Motorsports	Chevrolet	—	—
Official qualifying results
Official starting lineup

== Race ==
=== Race results ===
==== Stage Results ====
Stage One Laps: 45

Pos.	#	Driver	Team	Make	Pts
1	7	Justin Allgaier	JR Motorsports	Chevrolet	10
2	1	Connor Zilisch (i)	JR Motorsports	Chevrolet	0
3	88	Kyle Larson (i)	JR Motorsports	Chevrolet	0
4	20	Brandon Jones	Joe Gibbs Racing	Toyota	7
5	19	Brent Crews (R)	Joe Gibbs Racing	Toyota	6
6	00	Sheldon Creed	Haas Factory Team	Chevrolet	5
7	41	Sam Mayer	Haas Factory Team	Chevrolet	4
8	21	Austin Hill	Richard Childress Racing	Chevrolet	3
9	51	Jeremy Clements	Jeremy Clements Racing	Chevrolet	2
10	99	Parker Retzlaff	Viking Motorsports	Chevrolet	1

Stage Two Laps: 45

Pos.	#	Driver	Team	Make	Pts
1	1	Connor Zilisch (i)	JR Motorsports	Chevrolet	0
2	19	Brent Crews (R)	Joe Gibbs Racing	Toyota	9
3	7	Justin Allgaier	JR Motorsports	Chevrolet	8
4	88	Kyle Larson (i)	JR Motorsports	Chevrolet	0
5	41	Sam Mayer	Haas Factory Team	Chevrolet	6
6	20	Brandon Jones	Joe Gibbs Racing	Toyota	5
7	99	Parker Retzlaff	Viking Motorsports	Chevrolet	4
8	21	Austin Hill	Richard Childress Racing	Chevrolet	3
9	00	Sheldon Creed	Haas Factory Team	Chevrolet	2
10	18	William Sawalich	Joe Gibbs Racing	Toyota	1

=== Final Stage Results ===
Stage Three Laps: 110

Fin	St	#	Driver	Team	Make	Laps	Led	Status	Pts
1	3	88	Kyle Larson (i)	JR Motorsports	Chevrolet	200	93	Running	0
2	1	7	Justin Allgaier	JR Motorsports	Chevrolet	200	54	Running	54
3	17	41	Sam Mayer	Haas Factory Team	Chevrolet	200	0	Running	44
4	5	19	Brent Crews (R)	Joe Gibbs Racing	Toyota	200	2	Running	48
5	10	99	Parker Retzlaff	Viking Motorsports	Chevrolet	200	0	Running	37
6	11	00	Sheldon Creed	Haas Factory Team	Chevrolet	200	0	Running	38
7	7	21	Austin Hill	Richard Childress Racing	Chevrolet	200	0	Running	36
8	2	20	Brandon Jones	Joe Gibbs Racing	Toyota	200	0	Running	41
9	21	2	Jesse Love	Richard Childress Racing	Chevrolet	200	0	Running	28
10	8	51	Jeremy Clements	Jeremy Clements Racing	Chevrolet	200	0	Running	29
11	14	9	Carson Kvapil	JR Motorsports	Chevrolet	200	0	Running	26
12	18	96	Anthony Alfredo	Viking Motorsports	Chevrolet	200	0	Running	25
13	15	8	Sammy Smith	JR Motorsports	Chevrolet	200	0	Running	24
14	9	39	Ryan Sieg	RSS Racing	Chevrolet	200	1	Running	23
15	16	18	William Sawalich	Joe Gibbs Racing	Toyota	200	0	Running	23
16	22	26	Dean Thompson	Sam Hunt Racing	Toyota	200	0	Running	21
17	28	48	Patrick Staropoli (R)	Big Machine Racing	Chevrolet	200	0	Running	20
18	26	92	Josh Williams	DGM Racing	Chevrolet	200	0	Running	19
19	37	45	Lavar Scott (R)	Alpha Prime Racing	Chevrolet	200	0	Running	18
20	27	44	Brennan Poole	Alpha Prime Racing	Chevrolet	200	0	Running	17
21	4	1	Connor Zilisch (i)	JR Motorsports	Chevrolet	199	48	Running	0
22	24	24	Harrison Burton	Sam Hunt Racing	Toyota	199	0	Running	15
23	20	3	Austin Dillon (i)	Richard Childress Racing	Chevrolet	199	0	Running	0
24	38	02	Ryan Ellis	Young's Motorsports	Chevrolet	199	0	Running	13
25	29	31	Blaine Perkins	Jordan Anderson Racing	Chevrolet	199	0	Running	12
26	25	27	Jeb Burton	Jordan Anderson Racing	Chevrolet	199	0	Running	11
27	33	07	Josh Bilicki	SS-Green Light Racing	Chevrolet	198	0	Running	10
28	36	55	Joey Gase	Joey Gase Motorsports	Chevrolet	198	0	Running	9
29	35	53	David Starr	Joey Gase Motorsports	Chevrolet	197	0	Running	8
30	23	28	Kyle Sieg	RSS Racing	Chevrolet	196	0	Running	7
31	32	0	Garrett Smithley	SS-Green Light Racing	Chevrolet	194	0	Running	6
32	30	91	Mason Maggio	DGM Racing	Chevrolet	189	0	Running	5
33	12	54	Taylor Gray	Joe Gibbs Racing	Toyota	188	0	Running	4
34	13	32	Rajah Caruth	Jordan Anderson Racing	Chevrolet	180	2	Accident	3
35	19	87	Austin Green	Peterson Racing	Chevrolet	17	0	Accident	2
36	34	42	Brad Perez	Young's Motorsports	Chevrolet	17	0	Accident	1
37	6	17	Corey Day	Hendrick Motorsports	Chevrolet	1	0	DVP	1
38	31	35	Dawson Cram	Joey Gase Motorsports	Chevrolet	1	0	Engine	1
Official race results

=== Race statistics ===
- Lead changes: 13 among 6 different drivers
- Cautions/Laps: 7 for 36 laps
- Red flags: 0
- Time of race: 2 hours, 25 minutes and 23 seconds
- Average speed: 149.522 miles per hour (240.632 km/h)

== Standings after the race ==
Drivers' Championship standings

	Pos	Driver	Points
	1	Justin Allgaier	598
	2	Sheldon Creed	477 (–121)
	3	Jesse Love	431 (–167)
	4	Corey Day	400 (–198)
	5	Brandon Jones	394 (–204)
	6	Sammy Smith	376 (–222)
1	7	Austin Hill	357 (–241)
1	8	Carson Kvapil	357 (–241)
1	9	Parker Retzlaff	329 (–269)
1	10	Taylor Gray	306 (–292)
	11	William Sawalich	303 (–295)
2	12	Sam Mayer	285 (–313)
Official driver's standings

Manufacturers' Championship standings

Pos	Manufacturer	Points
1	Chevrolet	619
2	Toyota	404 (–215)
3	Ford	182 (–437)

- Note: Only the first 12 positions are included for the driver standings.

Previous race: 2026 Ag-Pro 300	NASCAR O'Reilly Auto Parts Series; 2026 season	Next race: 2026 Mission 200 at The Glen
