= Joey Gase Motorsports =

American stock car racing team

Joey Gase Motorsports with Scott Osteen
- Owner(s): Joey Gase; Scott Osteen
- Series: NASCAR O'Reilly Auto Parts Series
- Race drivers: 35. Natalie Decker, Nick Leitz, Austin J. Hill, Blake Lothian, Glen Reen, David Starr (part-time); 55. Joey Gase, Brad Perez
- Manufacturer: Chevrolet; Toyota; Ford
- Opened: 2021

Career
- Debut: O'Reilly Auto Parts Series: 2022 Beef. It's What's for Dinner. 300 (Daytona); ARCA Menards Series: 2023 BRANDT 200 (Daytona)
- Latest race: O'Reilly Auto Parts Series: 2026 O'Reilly Auto Parts 300 (Homestead); ARCA Menards Series: 2023 General Tire 200 (Talladega)
- Races competed: Total: 162; O'Reilly Auto Parts Series: 160; ARCA Menards Series: 2
- Drivers' Championships: Total: 0 O'Reilly Auto Parts Series: 0 ARCA Menards Series: 0
- Race victories: Total: 0 O'Reilly Auto Parts Series: 0 ARCA Menards Series: 0
- Pole positions: Total: 0 O'Reilly Auto Parts Series: 0 ARCA Menards Series: 0

Joey Gase Motorsports with Scott Osteen is an American stock car racing team that competes in the NASCAR O'Reilly Auto Parts Series. The team fields the No. 35 part-time and the No. 55 full-time for multiple drivers.

The team, originally Joey Gase Racing, was founded by NASCAR owner–driver Joey Gase in November 2021. Before the team attempted its first race under that name, NASCAR Whelen Modified Tour driver Patrick Emerling joined the team as a co-owner in December 2021 and the team was renamed Emerling-Gase Motorsports ahead of their first season in 2022.

On February 1, 2024, it was announced that Emerling would be splitting from Gase in 2024 and would go to SS-Green Light Racing to drive their No. 07 car for the majority of the 2024 NASCAR Xfinity Series season. On November 27, Floridian Motorsports owner Scott Osteen was announced as co-owner of the team.

== O'Reilly Auto Parts Series ==
=== Car No. 35 history ===
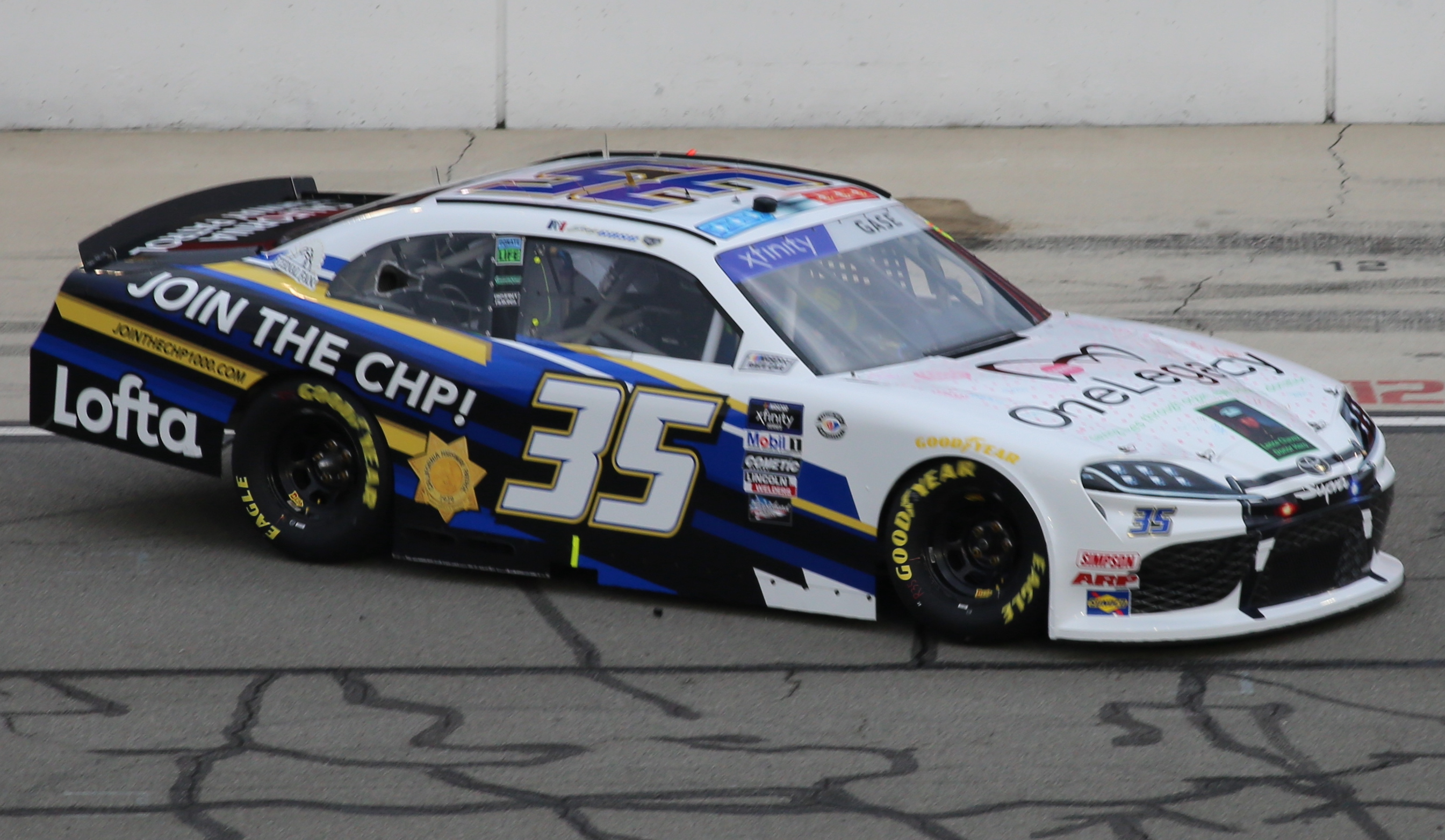
Joey Gase in the No. 35 at Fontana in 2023

On November 18, 2021, Joey Gase would announce that with cars bought from defunct team H2 Motorsports and owned five cars, Gase would race for his team, Joey Gase Racing in 2022, with Gase driving the No. 35 for "most" of the season.

On December 30, 2021, it was announced that Patrick Emerling would join the team to be a co-owner. The team was renamed to the now-current name Emerling-Gase Motorsports, and that Emerling and Shane Lee would also share the ride with Gase. The team would also receive Our Motorsports' No. 23 owner's points from the 2021 season. Jeffrey Earnhardt would drive the No. 35 car at spring race at Phoenix and September Las Vegas race. Parker Kligerman would drive the 35 car at COTA and Indy Road Course. Chris Dyson would drive the car at Road America. Brad Perez drove the 35 car at Watkins Glen and Charlotte Roval. Dawson Cram drove the 35 car at Darlington.

In 2023, C. J. McLaughlin drove the No. 35 car at Daytona. Joey Gase would drive the No. 35 at Fontana, Las Vegas and Phoenix. Patrick Emerling would drive the No. 35 at Atlanta. Parker Chase would attempt to qualify the No. 35 at COTA but would fail. Emerling would again drive the car at Richmond. Leland Honeyman drove the No. 35 at Sonoma, in which he failed to qualify. David Starr drove the No. 35 at Nashville Superspeedway and Atlanta. Alex Labbé would drive the No. 35 at Chicago Street Course and Indy Road Course. Stanton Barrett would drive No. 35 car in the race at Road America and the Shriners Children's 200 at Watkins Glen. B. J. McLeod drove the No. 35 at Bristol. Alex Guenette drove the No. 35 at Charlotte Roval. Chris Hacker drove the No. 35 at Martinsville.

In 2024, it was announced that Frankie Muniz would attempt to make his NASCAR Xfinity Series debut at the season-opening race at Daytona, driving the No. 35 Ford. Along with that race, he would compete on a part-time schedule in the car. At the 2024 ToyotaCare 250 at Richmond, Gase was involved in a crash during the final laps. In the heat of the moment, he tore off his bumper and threw it at the No. 4 car of Dawson Cram. NASCAR fined Gase US$5,000 for a safety violation may be imposed for any action or omission by a competitor or vehicle that creates an unsafe environment or poses a threat to the safety of the competitors. Akinori Ogata would drive the No. 35 at four races. J. J. Yeley would drive the No. 35 at 2024 BetRivers 200. Chad Finchum would drive the No. 35 at 2024 Crown Royal Purple Bag Project 200. Sage Karam drove the No. 35 at Sonoma, in which he failed to qualify. At New Hampshire, Glen Reen would drive the No. 35 to a 28th place finish. Logan Bearden would drive the No. 35 at Nashville. Stephen Mallozzi made his first start in the NASCAR Xfinity Series in the No. 35 at Pocono, finishing in 35th in his debut. Mason Maggio would drive the No. 35 car at Atlanta. Thomas Annunziata would make two starts in the No. 35 car. Carson Ware would return to NASCAR competition for the first time since his suspension, driving the No. 35 at Bristol. He would also compete for the team at Martinsville. Armani Williams would drive the No. 35 at Homestead.

On December 16, 2024, Greg Van Alst would run the majority of the 2025 season driving the No. 35 car. Van Alst would later downsize his schedule to focus more on his Truck Series team. Baltazar Leguizamón made his debut in the NASCAR Xfinity Series at the COTA. He finished in 37th due to mechanical issues. On June 10, 2025, it was announced that Rovelo would attempt to make his NASCAR Xfinity Series debut for his hometown race at Mexico, driving the No. 35 Chevrolet. He would finish in 37th place after suffering a broken track bar after the first stage. Andre Castro drove the No. 35 at Chicago Street Course. Austin J. Hill failed to qualify at both Sonoma and Charlotte Roval. At Iowa, the team formed a partnership with MBM Motorsports to field the No. 35 Ford for Tyler Tomassi. He finished 34th.Takuma Koga drove the No. 35 at Portland, where he finished in 29th. At Bristol and Phoenix, the team formed a partnership with Alpha Prime Racing to field the No. 35 for Stefan Parsons.

In 2026, Natalie Decker would drive the No. 35 at Daytona and Talladega. Blake Lothian would drive the No. 35 for five races starting at Phoenix. Chad Finchum would drive the No. 35 at Las Vegas. Matt DiBenedetto would drive the No. 35 at Darlington. Justin Carroll would make his NASCAR O'Reilly Auto Parts Series debut in the No. 35 at Martinsville. At Texas, the team formed a partnership with Mike Harmon Racing to field the No. 35 for Dawson Cram. This partnership continues for the next seven races with Matt Wilson driving the No. 35 at Watkins Glen, and Carson Ware driving the No. 35 at Pocono. After Sonoma, the No. 35 owner points were transferred to MHR No. 47. The No. 35 car would make a return at fall Martinsville race with Carroll behind the wheel.

==== Car No. 35 results ====
Year	Driver	No.	Make	1	2	3	4	5	6	7	8	9	10	11	12	13	14	15	16	17	18	19	20	21	22	23	24	25	26	27	28	29	30	31	32	33	Owners	Pts	Ref
2022	Shane Lee	35	Toyota	DAY; 33				ATL; 17								CLT; 24																					30th	387	
2022	Shane Lee	35	Ford								MAR; 27																										30th	387	
2022	Joey Gase	35	Toyota		CAL; 20	LVS; 22																						KAN; 30		TEX; 25						PHO; 24	30th	387	
2022	Joey Gase	35	Ford							RCH; 34		TAL; 16								ATL; 26						DAY; 16											30th	387	
2022	Jeffrey Earnhardt	35	Toyota				PHO; 34																										LVS; 27				30th	387	
2022	Jeffrey Earnhardt	35	Ford																												TAL; 37						30th	387	
2022	Parker Kligerman	35	Toyota						COA; 12														IND; 37														30th	387	
2022	Patrick Emerling	35	Chevy										DOV; 33	DAR; 24	TEX; 28			NSH; 26				POC; 29							BRI; 27						MAR; 32		30th	387	
2022	Patrick Emerling	35	Toyota														PIR; 19				NHA; 16			MCH; 25										HOM; 23			30th	387	
2022	Chris Dyson	35	Toyota																ROA; 28																		30th	387	
2022	Brad Perez	35	Toyota																						GLN; 20							CLT; 23					30th	387	
2022	Dawson Cram	35	Ford																								DAR; 30										30th	387	
2023	C. J. McLaughlin	35	Ford	DAY; 31																																	33rd	328	
2023	Joey Gase	35	Toyota		CAL; 29	LVS; 38	PHO; 26			RCH; 27																			KAN; 24		TEX; 26		LVS; 32				33rd	328	
2023	Joey Gase	35	Ford									TAL; 9																								PHO; 27	33rd	328	
2023	Joey Gase	35	Chevy																			POC; 31					DAY; 14										33rd	328	
2023	Patrick Emerling	35	Ford					ATL; 18																MCH; 34													33rd	328	
2023	Patrick Emerling	35	Toyota								MAR; 21																										33rd	328	
2023	Patrick Emerling	35	Chevy										DOV; 33	DAR; 21	CLT; 31						NHA; 14							DAR; 36						HOM; 25			33rd	328	
2023	Parker Chase	35	Toyota						COA; DNQ							PIR; 35																					33rd	328	
2023	Leland Honeyman	35	Chevy														SON; DNQ																				33rd	328	
2023	David Starr	35	Chevy															NSH; 30																			33rd	328	
2023	David Starr	35	Ford																	ATL; 22																	33rd	328	
2023	Alex Labbé	35	Toyota																CSC; 21						IND; 11												33rd	328	
2023	Stanton Barrett	35	Toyota																				ROA; 24			GLN; 32											33rd	328	
2023	B. J. McLeod	35	Chevy																											BRI; 37							33rd	328	
2023	Alex Guenette	35	Toyota																													ROV; 33					33rd	328	
2023	Chris Hacker	35	Chevy																																MAR; 30		33rd	328	
2024	Frankie Muniz	35	Ford	DAY; 33			PHO; 30									PIR; DNQ																					37th	233	
2024	Joey Gase	35	Chevy		ATL; 29	LVS; 30			RCH; 34		TEX; 30	TAL; 18						IOW; 16					IND; 24	MCH; 31						KAN; 32	TAL; 21					PHO; 27	37th	233	
2024	Alex Labbé	35	Toyota					COA; 26																													37th	233	
2024	Akinori Ogata	35	Toyota							MAR; 38																											37th	233	
2024	Akinori Ogata	35	Chevy												CLT; DNQ										DAY; 38								LVS; 35				37th	233	
2024	J. J. Yeley	35	Toyota										DOV; 38																								37th	233	
2024	Chad Finchum	35	Chevy											DAR; 26																							37th	233	
2024	Sage Karam	35	Toyota														SON; DNQ																				37th	233	
2024	Glen Reen	35	Chevy																NHA; 28																		37th	233	
2024	Logan Bearden	35	Chevy																	NSH; 32																	37th	233	
2024	Brad Perez	35	Ford																		CSC; DNQ																37th	233	
2024	Stephen Mallozzi	35	Chevy																			POC; 35															37th	233	
2024	David Starr	35	Chevy																							DAR; 24											37th	233	
2024	Mason Maggio	35	Chevy																								ATL; 18										37th	233	
2024	Thomas Annunziata	35	Toyota																									GLN; 29				ROV; 34					37th	233	
2024	Carson Ware	35	Chevy																										BRI; 28						MAR; 37		37th	233	
2024	Armani Williams	35	Ford																															HOM; 35			37th	233	
2025	Greg Van Alst	35	Chevy	DAY; 26			PHO; 31	LVS; 35		MAR; 36	DAR; 34	BRI; 32	CAR; 34	TAL; 35																							40th	193	
2025	Joey Gase	35	Chevy		ATL; 21				HOM; 29						TEX; 25					ATL; 18																	40th	193	
2025	Baltazar Leguizamón	35	Chevy			COA; 37																															40th	193	
2025	Carson Ware	35	Ford													CLT; DNQ			POC; 34																		40th	193	
2025	Glen Reen	35	Chevy														NSH; DNQ																				40th	193	
2025	Glen Reen	35	Toyota																				DOV; DNQ			GLN; 21			GTW; 31								40th	193	
2025	Glen Reen	35	Ford																												KAN; DNQ						40th	193	
2025	Rubén Rovelo	35	Chevy															MXC; 37																			40th	193	
2025	Andre Castro	35	Chevy																		CSC; 33																40th	193	
2025	Austin J. Hill	35	Chevy																			SON; DNQ										ROV; DNQ					40th	193	
2025	David Starr	35	Chevy																					IND; 29										TAL; 18			40th	193	
2025	Tyler Tomassi	35	Ford																						IOW; 34												40th	193	
2025	Mason Maggio	35	Chevy																								DAY; 15										40th	193	
2025	Mason Maggio	35	Ford																														LVS; 33				40th	193	
2025	Takuma Koga	35	Toyota																									PIR; 29							MAR; 37		40th	193	
2025	Stefan Parsons	35	Chevy																											BRI; 36						PHO; 29	40th	193	
2026	Natalie Decker	35	Chevy	DAY; 33										TAL; 33																							47th	11	
2026	Joey Gase	35	Chevy		ATL; 34						ROC; 31																										47th	11	
2026	Austin J. Hill	35	Chevy			COA; 38																															47th	11	
2026	Blake Lothian	35	Toyota				PHO; DNQ					BRI; 34																									47th	11	
2026	Blake Lothian	35	Chevy										KAN; 31																								47th	11	
2026	Chad Finchum	35	Chevy					LVS; DNQ																													47th	11	
2026	Matt DiBenedetto	35	Chevy						DAR; DNQ																												47th	11	
2026	Justin Carroll	35	Chevy							MAR; DNQ																									MAR; 26	HOM	47th	11	
2026	Dawson Cram	35	Chevy												TEX; 38		DOV; 28	CLT; 33	NSH; 34		COR; 21	SON; 33	CHI	ATL	IND	IOW	DAY	DAR	GTW	BRI	LVS	CLT	PHO	TAL			47th	11	
2026	Matt Wilson	35	Chevy													GLN; 37																					47th	11	
2026	Carson Ware	35	Chevy																	POC; 27																	47th	11	

=== Car No. 53 history ===
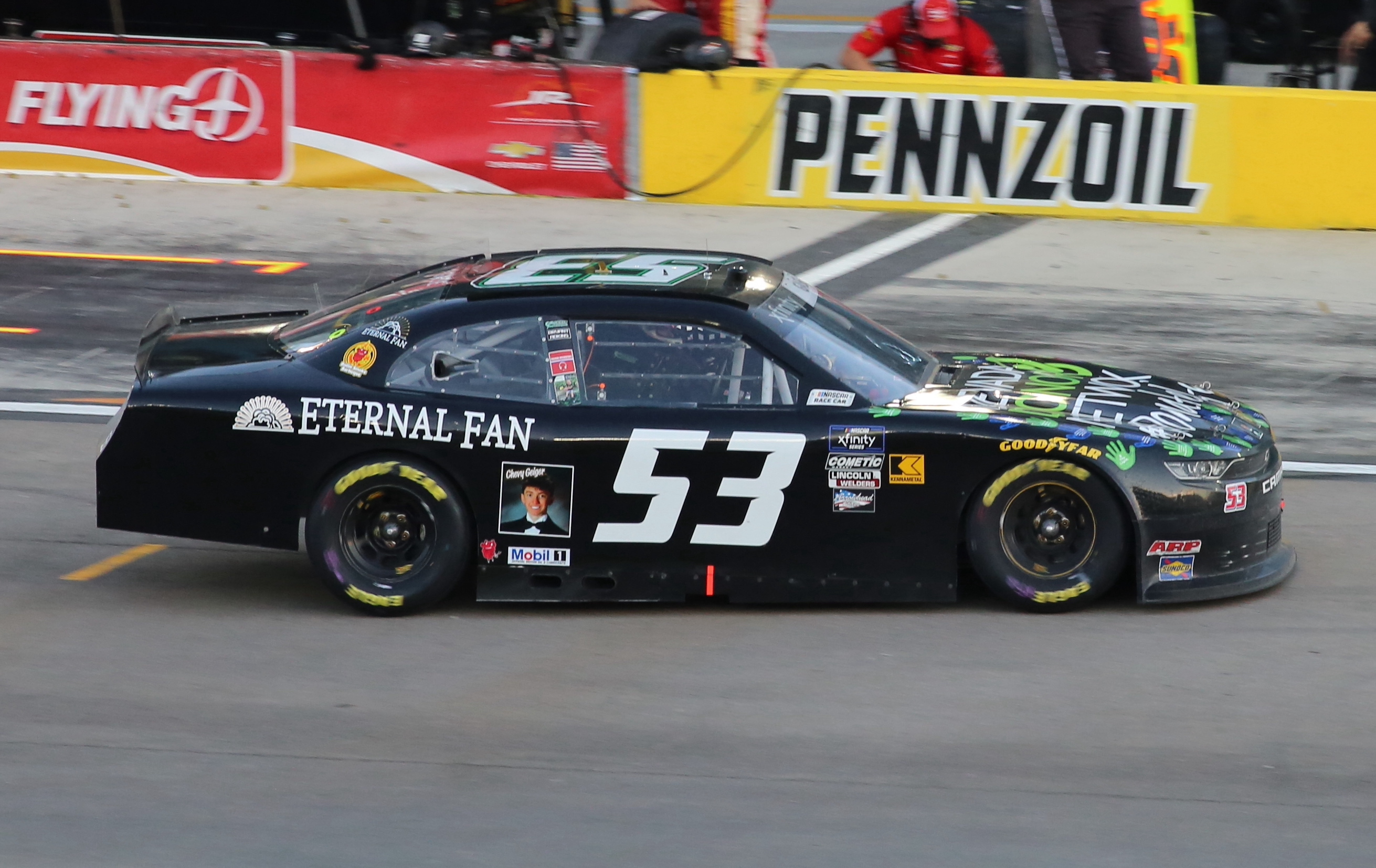
Joey Gase driving the No. 53 at Las Vegas in 2024

Along with the December 30 announcement, the team would announce that the team would now field a part-time No. 53 entry. The team has run the No. 53 twice in 2022 at Daytona and Talladega with Joey Gase and Shane Lee respectively. The No. 53 is scheduled to run full-time in 2023.

In 2023, Gase returned to the No. 53 car at Daytona. C. J. McLaughlin would run seventeen races in the No. 53 car. However, he only attempted six races while failing to qualify for two races. Patrick Emerling drove the No. 53 car for multiple races starting at Las Vegas. On January 23, Brad Perez announced in a video skit that he will drive the No. 53 car for four races, and may run more if sponsorship can be found. Matt Mills drove the No. 53 for 5 races. Akinori Ogata drove the No. 53 for 2 races at Atlanta and Martinsville. Natalie Decker drove the No. 53 car at summer Daytona race. At Bristol (race #27), Emerling drove the No. 35 Chevrolet in practice and during it, he crashed. Since the team did not have a backup car and the No. 35 was higher in the owner points standings than the No. 53, the team withdrew the No. 53 Chevrolet driven by B. J. McLeod and renumbered that car as the No. 35 for the race and McLeod drove the No. 35 car in the race replacing Emerling. Conor Daly drove the No. 53 car at Charlotte Roval. Chris Hacker drove the No. 53 at the season finale at Phoenix.

The No. 53 scaled back to a part–time schedule in 2024. Multiple drivers such as Gase, Glen Reen, Kenko Miura, Morgen Baird, Garrett Smithley, Carson Ware, Thomas Annunziata, and Mason Maggio drove the No. 53 throughout the season. Prior to the fall Talladega race, the team acquired the owner points from the JD Motorsports No. 6 car.

In 2025, the No. 53 returned back to full-time competition. Gase drove the No. 53 for the majority of the season. Maggio drove the No. 53 car for multiple races starting from Atlanta. Sage Karam drove the No. 53 car for multiple road course events. David Starr drove the No. 53 car at Darlington. At Rockingham, Katherine Legge failed to qualify Jordan Anderson Racing No. 32 car. Then it was announced that she would race the No. 53 car, in place of J. J. Yeley, who had already qualified the day prior, secured a 31st-place start. Legge finished 36th after William Sawalich got into the back of her car, which sent her spinning, and Kasey Kahne had nowhere to go on lap 52. Logan Bearden drove the No. 53 car at Pocono. Austin J. Hill drove the No. 53 car to a 20th place finish at Watkins Glen. Kyle Sieg drove the No. 53 car at Portland.

In 2026, Starr would drive the No. 53 at Daytona. However, he failed to qualify for the race. After Daytona, the No. 53 was scaled back to part-time entry. Prior to the race at Texas, the team acquired the owner points from the Hettinger Racing No. 5 car. Derek White would drive the No. 53 at Watkins Glen. Natalie Decker would drive the No. 53 at Pocono. Kyle Kelley would drive the No. 53 at Sonoma. Tyler Tomassi would drive the No. 53 at Chicagoland and Iowa. Glen Reen would drive the No. 53 at Atlanta and second Darlington race. Blake Lothian would drive the No. 53 at Indianapolis and fall Las Vegas race. Carson Ware would drive the No. 53 at summer Daytona race, Bristol night race, and fall Martinsville race. Austin J. Hill returned to drive the No. 53 at Gateway. Derek Lemke would drive the No. 53 at fall Charlotte race. Will Rodgers would drive the No. 53 for three races in partnership with Big Machine Racing.

==== Car No. 53 results ====
Year	Driver	No.	Make	1	2	3	4	5	6	7	8	9	10	11	12	13	14	15	16	17	18	19	20	21	22	23	24	25	26	27	28	29	30	31	32	33	Owners	Pts	Ref
2022	Joey Gase	53	Ford	DAY; 26	CAL	LVS	PHO	ATL	COA	RCH	MAR																										45th	34	
2022	Shane Lee	53	Ford									TAL; 14	DOV	DAR	TEX	CLT	PIR	NSH	ROA	ATL	NHA	POC	IND	MCH	GLN	DAY	DAR	KAN	BRI	TEX	TAL	CLT	LVS	HOM	MAR	PHO	45th	34	
2023	Joey Gase	53	Ford	DAY; 18														NSH; 31																			37th	219	
2023	Joey Gase	53	Chevy					ATL; 37																													37th	219	
2023	C. J. McLaughlin	53	Chevy		CAL; 37																NHA; 28			MCH; DNQ													37th	219	
2023	C. J. McLaughlin	53	Ford									TAL; 13	DOV; 34		CLT; DNQ																						37th	219	
2023	Patrick Emerling	53	Ford			LVS; 34				RCH; 29																											37th	219	
2023	Patrick Emerling	53	Chevy				PHO; 30									PIR; 20						POC; 26	ROA; 22			GLN; DNQ					TEX; 35		LVS; 38				37th	219	
2023	Brad Perez	53	Chevy						COA; 29										CSC; 32						IRC; 38												37th	219	
2023	Brad Perez	53	Toyota														SON; 29																				37th	219	
2023	Matt Mills	53	Ford								MAR; 22			DAR; 28																							37th	219	
2023	Matt Mills	53	Toyota																									DAR; 27						HOM; DNQ			37th	219	
2023	Matt Mills	53	Chevy																										KAN; 19								37th	219	
2023	Akinori Ogata	53	Chevy																	ATL; 29															MAR; 33		37th	219	
2023	Natalie Decker	53	Ford																								DAY; 35										37th	219	
2023	B. J. McLeod	53	Chevy																											BRI; Wth							37th	219	
2023	Conor Daly	53	Chevy																													ROV; 35					37th	219	
2023	Chris Hacker	53	Chevy																																	PHO; 35	37th	219	
2024	Joey Gase	53	Chevy	DAY; DNQ	ATL	LVS	PHO	COA	RCH																								LVS; 30				39th	176	
2024	Joey Gase	53	Ford							MAR; 28	TEX	TAL	DOV	DAR	CLT	PIR	SON								DAY; 20	DAR											39th	176	
2024	Glen Reen	53	Chevy															IOW; 38	NHA	NSH																	39th	176	
2024	Kenko Miura	53	Toyota																		CSC; DNQ	POC	IND														39th	176	
2024	Morgen Baird	53	Ford																					MCH; DNQ			ATL; 33	GLN									39th	176	
2024	Garrett Smithley	53	Ford																										BRI; 36	KAN						PHO; 30	39th	176	
2024	Carson Ware	53	Ford																												TAL; 21	ROV					39th	176	
2024	Thomas Annunziata	53	Chevy																															HOM; 36			39th	176	
2024	Mason Maggio	53	Ford																																MAR; 22		39th	176	
2025	Joey Gase	53	Chevy	DAY; 15			PHO; 28	LVS; 33						TAL; 21										IND; 28	IOW; 27		DAY; 21		GTW; 26	BRI; 35	KAN; 33		LVS; 35	TAL; 16		PHO; 30	37th	278	
2025	Mason Maggio	53	Ford		ATL; 31				HOM; 35	MAR; 25					TEX; 26		NSH; 28			ATL; 27															MAR; 32		37th	278	
2025	Mason Maggio	53	Chevy									BRI; 38																									37th	278	
2025	Sage Karam	53	Toyota			COA; 34												MXC; 33			CSC; DNQ	SON; 36										ROV; 25					37th	278	
2025	David Starr	53	Chevy								DAR; 26												DOV; DNQ														37th	278	
2025	J. J. Yeley	53	Chevy										CAR; QL^{‡}			CLT; 28																					37th	278	
2025	Katherine Legge	53	Chevy										CAR; 36																								37th	278	
2025	Logan Bearden	53	Chevy																POC; 27																		37th	278	
2025	Austin J. Hill	53	Chevy																							GLN; 20											37th	278	
2025	Kyle Sieg	53	Chevy																									PIR; 26									37th	278	
2026	David Starr	53	Chevy	DAY; DNQ	ATL	COA	PHO	LVS	DAR	MAR	CAR	BRI	KAN	TAL	TEX; 29		DOV; 33	CLT; 20	NSH; 37																		35th	307	
2026	Derek White	53	Chevy													GLN; 32																					35th	307	
2026	Natalie Decker	53	Toyota																	POC; 34																	35th	307	
2026	Joey Gase	53	Chevy																		COR; 23																35th	307	
2026	Kyle Kelley	53	Chevy																			SON; 34															35th	307	
2026	Tyler Tomassi	53	Chevy																				CHI; 33														35th	307	
2026	Tyler Tomassi	53	Toyota																							IOW; 32											35th	307	
2026	Glen Reen	53	Chevy																					ATL; 15													35th	307	
2026	Glen Reen	53	Toyota																									DAR; 34									35th	307	
2026	Blake Lothian	53	Chevy																						IND; 34						LVS; 32						35th	307	
2026	Carson Ware	53	Chevy																								DAY; 24			BRI; 29					MAR; 23		35th	307	
2026	Austin J. Hill	53	Chevy																										GTW; 32								35th	307	
2026	Derek Lemke	53	Chevy																													CLT; 28					35th	307	
2026	Will Rodgers	53	Chevy																														PHO; 29	TAL; 25		HOM; 13	35th	307	

=== Car No. 55 history ===
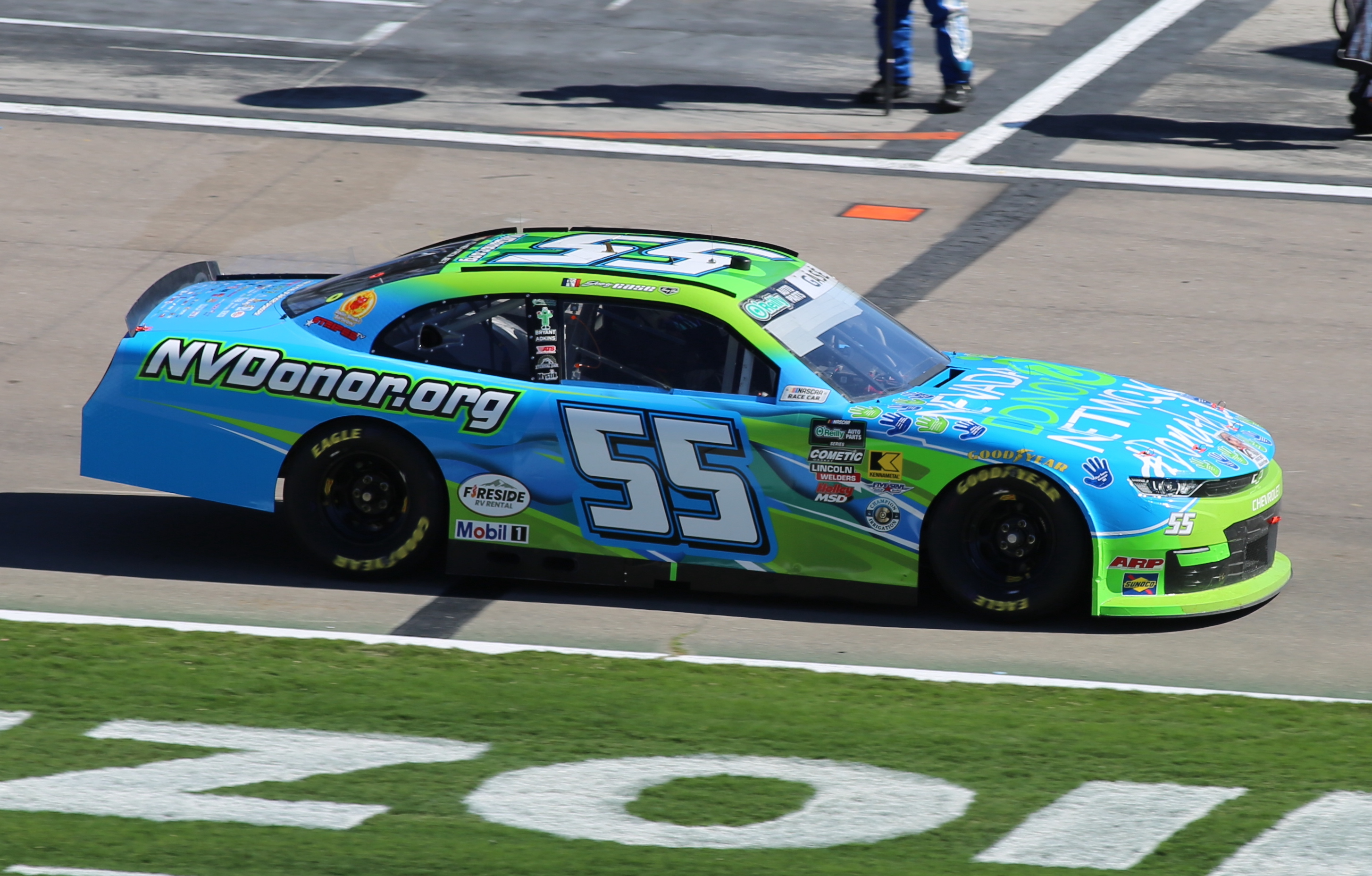
Joey Gase in the No. 55 car at Las Vegas in 2026

In 2026, the team fielded the No. 55 car as the third entry. Joey Gase become the primary driver of this entry. Chad Finchum would drive the No. 55 car at Atlanta. Sage Karam would drive the No. 55 at COTA. Blake Lothian would drive the No. 55 at Rockingham and Dover. Glen Reen would drive the No. 55 at Watkins Glen. Brad Perez would drive the No. 55 at San Diego and Sonoma. David Starr would drive the No. 55 at Bristol night race.

==== Car No. 55 results ====
Year	Driver	No.	Make	1	2	3	4	5	6	7	8	9	10	11	12	13	14	15	16	17	18	19	20	21	22	23	24	25	26	27	28	29	30	31	32	33	Owners	Pts	Ref
2026	Joey Gase	55	Chevy	DAY; DNQ			PHO; 19	LVS; 29	DAR; 31	MAR; 24		BRI; 31	KAN; 27	TAL; 19	TEX; 28			CLT; 23	NSH; 36				CHI; 34		IND; 36		DAY; 23	DAR; 29						TAL; 20			36th	300	
2026	Joey Gase	55	Ford																	POC; 36				ATL; 37		IOW; 22			GTW; 27		LVS; 27	CLT; 15	PHO; 33		MAR; 25	HOM; 26	36th	300	
2026	Chad Finchum	55	Chevy		ATL; 17																																36th	300	
2026	Sage Karam	55	Toyota			COA; 38																															36th	300	
2026	Blake Lothian	55	Chevy								ROC; 30																										36th	300	
2026	Blake Lothian	55	Toyota														DOV; 26																				36th	300	
2026	Glen Reen	55	Toyota													GLN; 30																					36th	300	
2026	Brad Perez	55	Toyota																		COR; 19	SON; 38															36th	300	
2026	David Starr	55	Chevy																											BRI; 35							36th	300	

== ARCA Menards Series ==
=== Car No. 53 history ===
In 2023, EGM announced they had purchased a superspeedway ARCA car from Tricon Garage (Formerly DGR Crosley) they also announced that they would field the No. 53 Ford Fusion for Natalie Decker in the ARCA Menards Series at Daytona. Decker finished fourteenth in the season opener at Daytona. The No. 53 car returned at Talladega with Patrick Emerling behind the wheel. Emerling finished sixteenth in the Talladega ARCA event.

Before co-owner Patrick Emerling left the team on February 1, 2024, he had announced plans to enter the ARCA season-opener at Daytona again driving the No. 53 car and had participated in the series' pre-season test session at the track in January. With a car having been prepared and an entry having been filed, Emerling still attempted the race on his own and instead used the No. 08 and finished seventeenth.

==== Car No. 53 results ====
Year	Driver	No.	Make	1	2	3	4	5	6	7	8	9	10	11	12	13	14	15	16	17	18	19	20	AMSOC	Pts	Ref
2023	Natalie Decker	53	Ford	DAY; 14	PHO																			45th	58	
2023	Patrick Emerling	53	Ford			TAL; 16	KAN	CLT	BLN	ELK	MOH	IOW	POC	MCH	IRP	GLN	ISF	MLW	DSF	KAN	BRI	SLM	TOL	45th	58	

== Floridian Motorsports ==
Floridian Motorsports
- Owner: Scott Osteen
- Series: NASCAR Craftsman Truck Series
- Race drivers: 21. Mason Maggio, Sage Karam, Jayson Alexander (part-time)
- Manufacturer: Toyota; Ford
- Opened: 2024
- Closed: 2024

Career
- Debut: 2024 fr8 208 (Atlanta)
- Latest race: 2024 Love's RV Stop 225 (Talladega)
- Races competed: 9
- Drivers' Championships: 0
- Race victories: 0
- Pole positions: 0

Floridian Motorsports was an American stock car racing team that competed in the NASCAR Craftsman Truck Series. The team was founded in 2024 by Scott Osteen.

=== Truck No. 21 history ===
Floridian Motorsports was founded by Scott Osteen in 2024, one week before the 2024 NASCAR Craftsman Truck Series season started. The team acquired a former Kyle Busch Motorsports superspeedway chassis from On Point Motorsports for Daytona along with two engines.

On February 9, 2024, it was announced that Mason Maggio would attempt the Fresh From Florida 250 at Daytona and other races at intermediate tracks.

Sage Karam would drive the No. 21 truck in the race at his home track of Pocono, running his first Truck Series race since 2021 when he drove the Jordan Anderson Racing No. 3 truck at Martinsville.

Blake Lothian had originally been on the entry list for the race at the Milwaukee Mile in the No. 21 truck but was replaced by Jayson Alexander on the Thursday before the race due to lack of sponsorship. Alexander would attempt to make his Truck Series debut in this race.

==== Truck No. 21 results ====
Year	Driver	No.	Make	1	2	3	4	5	6	7	8	9	10	11	12	13	14	15	16	17	18	19	20	21	22	23	Owners	Pts	Ref
2024	Mason Maggio	21	Toyota	DAY; DNQ																			TAL; 18	HOM	MAR	PHO	36th	72	
2024	Mason Maggio	21	Ford		ATL; 24	LVS	BRI; 29	COA	MAR	TEX	KAN	DAR	NWS	CLT; 27	GTW	NSH; 35			RCH; 28		BRI; 31	KAN					36th	72	
2024	Sage Karam	21	Ford														POC; 33	IRP									36th	72	
2024	Jayson Alexander	21	Ford																	MLW; 36							36th	72	
