= 2026 United Rentals 300 =

NASCAR O'Reilly Auto Parts Series race at Daytona International Speedway

Race details
- Race 1 of 33 in the 2026 NASCAR O'Reilly Auto Parts Series
- Date: February 14, 2026
- Location: Daytona International Speedway in Daytona Beach, Florida
- Course: Permanent racing facility
- Course length: 2.5 miles (4.0 km)
- Distance: 120 laps, 300 mi (480 km)
- Average speed: 116.618 miles per hour (187.678 km/h)

Pole position
Driver	Austin Hill	Richard Childress Racing
- Time: 49.390

Most laps led
Driver	Austin Hill	Richard Childress Racing
- Laps: 78

Fastest lap
Driver	Rajah Caruth	JR Motorsports
- Time: 47.082

Winner
No. 21	Austin Hill	Richard Childress Racing

Television in the United States
- Network: The CW
- Announcers: Adam Alexander, Jamie McMurray, and Parker Kligerman

Radio in the United States
- Radio: MRN
- Booth announcers: Alex Hayden and Mike Bagley
- Turn announcers: Dave Moody (1 & 2), Kyle Rickey (Backstretch), and Tim Catalfamo (3 & 4)

The 2026 United Rentals 300 was a NASCAR O'Reilly Auto Parts Series race held on Saturday, February 14, 2026, at Daytona International Speedway in Daytona Beach, Florida. Contested over 120 laps on the 2.5-mile (4.0 km) superspeedway, it was the first race of the 2026 NASCAR O'Reilly Auto Parts Series season, and the 45th running of the event.

Austin Hill, driving for Richard Childress Racing, would survive a wreck-filled race and continued his superspeedway prowess, winning both stages and led a race-high 78 laps from the pole position to earn his 15th career NASCAR O'Reilly Auto Parts Series win, his first of the season, and his 11th superspeedway win in the series. It was also his fourth win in the season-opening race in the last five years. Justin Allgaier finished second, and Ryan Sieg finished third. Jordan Anderson and Sammy Smith rounded out the top five, while Ryan Ellis, Carson Kvapil, Blaine Perkins, Jesse Love, and Rajah Caruth rounded out the top ten.

== Report ==
=== Background ===
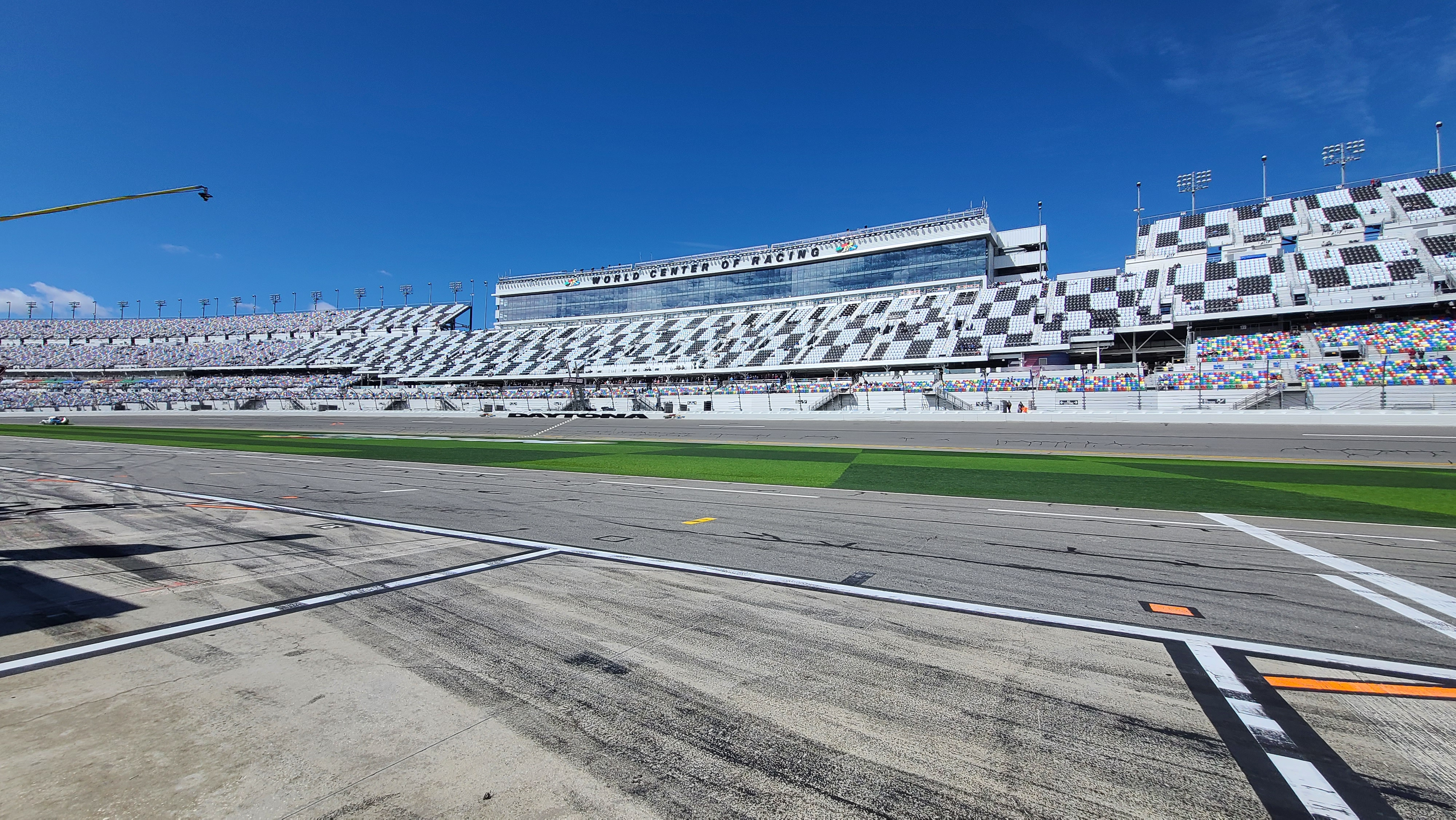
Daytona International Speedway, the track where the race will be held.

Daytona International Speedway is one of three superspeedways to hold NASCAR races, the other two being Atlanta Motor Speedway and Talladega Superspeedway. The standard track at Daytona International Speedway is a four-turn superspeedway that is 2.5 miles (4.0 km) long. The track's turns are banked at 31 degrees, while the front stretch, the location of the finish line, is banked at 18 degrees.

==== Entry list ====
- (R) denotes rookie driver.
- (i) denotes driver who is ineligible for series driver points.

#	Driver	Team	Make
00	Sheldon Creed	Haas Factory Team	Chevrolet
0	Garrett Smithley	SS-Green Light Racing	Chevrolet
02	Ryan Ellis	Young's Motorsports	Chevrolet
2	Jesse Love	Richard Childress Racing	Chevrolet
4	Anthony Alfredo	Alpha Prime Racing	Chevrolet
5	Luke Fenhaus (R)	Hettinger Racing	Ford
07	Josh Bilicki	SS-Green Light Racing	Chevrolet
7	Justin Allgaier	JR Motorsports	Chevrolet
8	Sammy Smith	JR Motorsports	Chevrolet
17	Corey Day	Hendrick Motorsports	Chevrolet
18	William Sawalich	Joe Gibbs Racing	Toyota
19	Gio Ruggiero (i)	Joe Gibbs Racing	Toyota
20	Brandon Jones	Joe Gibbs Racing	Toyota
21	Austin Hill	Richard Childress Racing	Chevrolet
24	Harrison Burton	Sam Hunt Racing	Toyota
25	Nick Sanchez	AM Racing	Ford
26	Dean Thompson	Sam Hunt Racing	Toyota
27	Jeb Burton	Jordan Anderson Racing	Chevrolet
28	Kyle Sieg	RSS Racing	Chevrolet
30	Carson Ware	Barrett–Cope Racing	Chevrolet
31	Blaine Perkins	Jordan Anderson Racing	Chevrolet
32	Jordan Anderson	Jordan Anderson Racing	Chevrolet
35	Natalie Decker	Joey Gase Motorsports	Chevrolet
38	Patrick Emerling (i)	RSS Racing	Chevrolet
39	Ryan Sieg	RSS Racing	Chevrolet
41	Sam Mayer	Haas Factory Team	Chevrolet
42	Carson Hocevar (i)	Young's Motorsports	Chevrolet
44	Brennan Poole	Alpha Prime Racing	Chevrolet
45	Lavar Scott (R)	Alpha Prime Racing	Chevrolet
48	Patrick Staropoli (R)	Big Machine Racing	Chevrolet
51	Jeremy Clements	Jeremy Clements Racing	Chevrolet
52	Daniel Dye (i)	AM Racing	Ford
53	David Starr	Joey Gase Motorsports	Chevrolet
54	Taylor Gray	Joe Gibbs Racing	Toyota
55	Joey Gase	Joey Gase Motorsports	Chevrolet
87	Austin Green	Peterson Racing	Chevrolet
88	Rajah Caruth	JR Motorsports	Chevrolet
91	Mason Maggio	DGM Racing	Chevrolet
92	Josh Williams	DGM Racing	Chevrolet
96	Anthony Alfredo	Viking Motorsports	Chevrolet
99	Parker Retzlaff	Viking Motorsports	Chevrolet
Official entry list

== Practice ==
The first and only practice session was held on Friday, February 13, at 4:30 PM EST, and would last for 50 minutes.

Jeb Burton, driving for Jordan Anderson Racing, would set the fastest time in the session, with a lap of 48.735, and a speed of 184.672 miles per hour (297.201 km/h).

=== Practice results ===
Pos.	#	Driver	Team	Make	Time	Speed
1	27	Jeb Burton	Jordan Anderson Racing	Chevrolet	48.735	184.672
2	26	Dean Thompson	Sam Hunt Racing	Toyota	48.853	184.226
3	17	Corey Day	Hendrick Motorsports	Chevrolet	48.856	184.215
Full practice results

== Qualifying ==
Qualifying was held on Saturday, February 14, at 10:00 AM EST. Since Daytona International Speedway is a superspeedway, the qualifying procedure used is a single-car, single-lap system with two rounds. In the first round, drivers have one lap to set a time and determine positions 11-38. The fastest ten drivers from the first round will advance to the second round, and whoever sets the fastest time in Round 2 will win the pole and determine the rest of the starting lineup.

Austin Hill, driving for Richard Childress Racing, would score the pole after advancing from the preliminary round and setting the fastest time in Round 2, with a lap of 49.390, and a speed of 182.223 miles per hour (293.259 km/h).

Three drivers would fail to qualify: Garrett Smithley, David Starr, and Joey Gase. Anthony Alfredo, who originally failed to qualify in his No. 96 car, would make a deal with Alpha Prime Racing to run their No. 4 car in the race, replacing Caesar Bacarella.

=== Qualifying results ===
Pos.	#	Driver	Team	Make	Time (R1)	Speed (R1)	Time (R2)	Speed (R2)
1	21	Austin Hill	Richard Childress Racing	Chevrolet	49.433	182.065	49.390	182.223
2	2	Jesse Love	Richard Childress Racing	Chevrolet	49.411	182.146	49.391	182.219
3	41	Sam Mayer	Haas Factory Team	Chevrolet	49.493	181.844	49.399	182.190
4	18	William Sawalich	Joe Gibbs Racing	Toyota	49.408	182.157	49.429	182.079
5	00	Sheldon Creed	Haas Factory Team	Chevrolet	49.508	181.789	49.430	182.076
6	17	Corey Day	Hendrick Motorsports	Chevrolet	49.553	181.624	49.430	182.076
7	88	Rajah Caruth	JR Motorsports	Chevrolet	49.542	181.664	49.472	181.921
8	48	Patrick Staropoli (R)	Big Machine Racing	Chevrolet	49.551	181.631	49.508	181.789
9	54	Taylor Gray	Joe Gibbs Racing	Toyota	49.591	181.485	49.557	181.609
10	39	Ryan Sieg	RSS Racing	Chevrolet	49.595	181.470	49.608	181.422
Eliminated in Round 1
11	1	Carson Kvapil	JR Motorsports	Chevrolet	49.633	181.331	—	—
12	8	Sammy Smith	JR Motorsports	Chevrolet	49.683	181.148	—	—
13	7	Justin Allgaier	JR Motorsports	Chevrolet	49.701	181.083	—	—
14	31	Blaine Perkins	Jordan Anderson Racing	Chevrolet	49.708	181.057	—	—
15	20	Brandon Jones	Joe Gibbs Racing	Toyota	49.733	180.966	—	—
16	19	Gio Ruggiero (i)	Joe Gibbs Racing	Toyota	49.739	180.945	—	—
17	32	Jordan Anderson	Jordan Anderson Racing	Chevrolet	49.739	180.945	—	—
18	26	Dean Thompson	Sam Hunt Racing	Toyota	49.800	180.723	—	—
19	38	Patrick Emerling (i)	RSS Racing	Chevrolet	49.807	180.697	—	—
20	42	Carson Hocevar (i)	Young's Motorsports	Chevrolet	49.832	180.607	—	—
21	91	Mason Maggio	DGM Racing	Chevrolet	49.838	180.585	—	—
22	27	Jeb Burton	Jordan Anderson Racing	Chevrolet	49.852	180.534	—	—
23	5	Luke Fenhaus (R)	Hettinger Racing	Ford	49.894	180.382	—	—
24	24	Harrison Burton	Sam Hunt Racing	Toyota	49.908	180.332	—	—
25	44	Brennan Poole	Alpha Prime Racing	Chevrolet	49.923	180.278	—	—
26	4	Caesar Bacarella	Alpha Prime Racing	Chevrolet	49.928	180.260	—	—
27	99	Parker Retzlaff	Viking Motorsports	Chevrolet	49.941	180.213	—	—
28	25	Nick Sanchez	AM Racing	Ford	49.968	180.115	—	—
29	51	Jeremy Clements	Jeremy Clements Racing	Chevrolet	50.016	179.942	—	—
30	87	Austin Green	Peterson Racing	Chevrolet	50.061	179.781	—	—
31	92	Josh Williams	DGM Racing	Chevrolet	50.074	179.734	—	—
32	02	Ryan Ellis	Young's Motorsports	Chevrolet	50.083	179.702	—	—
Qualified by owner's points
33	52	Daniel Dye (i)	AM Racing	Ford	50.103	179.630	—	—
34	07	Josh Bilicki	SS-Green Light Racing	Chevrolet	50.111	179.601	—	—
35	35	Natalie Decker	Joey Gase Motorsports	Chevrolet	50.236	179.154	—	—
36	28	Kyle Sieg	RSS Racing	Chevrolet	50.250	179.104	—	—
37	45	Lavar Scott (R)	Alpha Prime Racing	Chevrolet	50.460	178.359	—	—
38	30	Carson Ware	Barrett–Cope Racing	Chevrolet	—	—	—	—
Failed to qualify
39	0	Garrett Smithley	SS-Green Light Racing	Chevrolet	50.131	179.530	—	—
40	53	David Starr	Joey Gase Motorsports	Chevrolet	50.192	179.311	—	—
41	96	Anthony Alfredo	Viking Motorsports	Chevrolet	50.237	179.151	—	—
42	55	Joey Gase	Joey Gase Motorsports	Chevrolet	50.633	177.750	—	—
Official qualifying results
Official starting lineup

== Race ==
=== Race results ===
==== Stage results ====
Stage One Laps: 30

Pos.	#	Driver	Team	Make	Pts
1	21	Austin Hill	Richard Childress Racing	Chevrolet	10
2	2	Jesse Love	Richard Childress Racing	Chevrolet	9
3	1	Carson Kvapil	JR Motorsports	Chevrolet	8
4	7	Justin Allgaier	JR Motorsports	Chevrolet	7
5	31	Blaine Perkins	Jordan Anderson Racing	Chevrolet	6
6	00	Sheldon Creed	Haas Factory Team	Chevrolet	5
7	18	William Sawalich	Joe Gibbs Racing	Toyota	4
8	25	Nick Sanchez	AM Racing	Ford	3
9	51	Jeremy Clements	Jeremy Clements Racing	Chevrolet	2
10	20	Brandon Jones	Joe Gibbs Racing	Toyota	1

Stage Two Laps: 30

Pos.	#	Driver	Team	Make	Pts
1	21	Austin Hill	Richard Childress Racing	Chevrolet	10
2	1	Carson Kvapil	JR Motorsports	Chevrolet	9
3	7	Justin Allgaier	JR Motorsports	Chevrolet	8
4	18	William Sawalich	Joe Gibbs Racing	Toyota	7
5	88	Rajah Caruth	JR Motorsports	Chevrolet	6
6	99	Parker Retzlaff	Viking Motorsports	Chevrolet	5
7	8	Sammy Smith	JR Motorsports	Chevrolet	4
8	51	Jeremy Clements	Jeremy Clements Racing	Chevrolet	3
9	27	Jeb Burton	Jordan Anderson Racing	Chevrolet	2
10	31	Blaine Perkins	Jordan Anderson Racing	Chevrolet	1

=== Final Stage results ===
Stage Three Laps: 60

Fin	St	#	Driver	Team	Make	Laps	Led	Status	Pts
1	1	21	Austin Hill	Richard Childress Racing	Chevrolet	120	78	Running	75
2	13	7	Justin Allgaier	JR Motorsports	Chevrolet	120	0	Running	50
3	10	39	Ryan Sieg	RSS Racing	Chevrolet	120	0	Running	34
4	17	32	Jordan Anderson	Jordan Anderson Racing	Chevrolet	120	4	Running	33
5	12	8	Sammy Smith	JR Motorsports	Chevrolet	120	1	Running	36
6	32	02	Ryan Ellis	Young's Motorsports	Chevrolet	120	1	Running	31
7	11	1	Carson Kvapil	JR Motorsports	Chevrolet	120	0	Running	47
8	14	31	Blaine Perkins	Jordan Anderson Racing	Chevrolet	120	0	Running	36
9	2	2	Jesse Love	Richard Childress Racing	Chevrolet	120	27	Running	37
10	7	88	Rajah Caruth	JR Motorsports	Chevrolet	120	1	Running	34
11	26	4	Anthony Alfredo	Alpha Prime Racing	Chevrolet	120	0	Running	26
12	25	44	Brennan Poole	Alpha Prime Racing	Chevrolet	120	0	Running	25
13	19	38	Patrick Emerling (i)	RSS Racing	Chevrolet	120	0	Running	0
14	27	99	Parker Retzlaff	Viking Motorsports	Chevrolet	120	0	Running	28
15	36	28	Kyle Sieg	RSS Racing	Chevrolet	120	0	Running	22
16	37	45	Lavar Scott (R)	Alpha Prime Racing	Chevrolet	120	0	Running	21
17	34	07	Josh Bilicki	SS-Green Light Racing	Chevrolet	120	0	Running	20
18	8	48	Patrick Staropoli (R)	Big Machine Racing	Chevrolet	120	0	Running	19
19	38	30	Carson Ware	Barrett–Cope Racing	Chevrolet	120	0	Running	18
20	20	42	Carson Hocevar (i)	Young's Motorsports	Chevrolet	120	0	Running	0
21	33	52	Daniel Dye (i)	AM Racing	Ford	120	0	Running	0
22	30	87	Austin Green	Peterson Racing	Chevrolet	118	0	Running	15
23	23	5	Luke Fenhaus (R)	Hettinger Racing	Ford	117	0	Running	14
24	5	00	Sheldon Creed	Haas Factory Team	Chevrolet	116	0	Running	18
25	22	27	Jeb Burton	Jordan Anderson Racing	Chevrolet	107	0	DVP	14
26	4	18	William Sawalich	Joe Gibbs Racing	Toyota	99	2	DVP	22
27	6	17	Corey Day	Hendrick Motorsports	Chevrolet	99	0	Accident	10
28	9	54	Taylor Gray	Joe Gibbs Racing	Toyota	99	0	Accident	9
29	24	24	Harrison Burton	Sam Hunt Racing	Toyota	98	0	Accident	8
30	15	20	Brandon Jones	Joe Gibbs Racing	Toyota	92	0	DVP	8
31	3	41	Sam Mayer	Haas Factory Team	Chevrolet	91	6	Accident	6
32	29	51	Jeremy Clements	Jeremy Clements Racing	Chevrolet	91	0	Accident	10
33	35	35	Natalie Decker	Joey Gase Motorsports	Chevrolet	91	0	Accident	4
34	31	92	Josh Williams	DGM Racing	Chevrolet	77	0	Engine	3
35	18	26	Dean Thompson	Sam Hunt Racing	Toyota	68	0	Suspension	2
36	28	25	Nick Sanchez	AM Racing	Ford	32	0	Accident	4
37	16	19	Gio Ruggiero (i)	Joe Gibbs Racing	Toyota	29	0	Accident	0
38	21	91	Mason Maggio	DGM Racing	Chevrolet	0	0	Accident	1
Official race results

=== Race statistics ===
- Lead changes: 15 among 8 different drivers
- Cautions/Laps: 7 for 36 laps
- Red flags: 1
- Time of race: 2 hours, 34 minutes and 21 seconds
- Average speed: 116.618 miles per hour (187.678 km/h)

== Standings after the race ==
Drivers' Championship standings

Pos	Driver	Points
1	Austin Hill	75
2	Justin Allgaier	50 (–25)
3	Carson Kvapil	47 (–28)
4	Jesse Love	37 (–38)
5	Sammy Smith	36 (–39)
6	Blaine Perkins	36 (–39)
7	Ryan Sieg	34 (–41)
8	Rajah Caruth	34 (–41)
9	Jordan Anderson	33 (–42)
10	Ryan Ellis	31 (–44)
11	Parker Retzlaff	28 (–47)
12	Anthony Alfredo	26 (–49)
Official driver's standings

Manufacturers' Championship standings

Pos	Manufacturer	Points
1	Chevrolet	40
2	Ford	16 (–24)
3	Toyota	11 (–29)

- Note: Only the first 12 positions are included for the driver standings.

Previous race: 2025 NASCAR Xfinity Series Championship Race	NASCAR O'Reilly Auto Parts Series; 2026 season	Next race: 2026 Bennett Transportation & Logistics 250
