= 2026 Mission 200 at The Glen =

NASCAR O'Reilly Auto Parts Series race at Watkins Glen International

Race details
- Race 13 of 33 in the 2026 NASCAR O'Reilly Auto Parts Series
- Date: May 9, 2026
- Location: Watkins Glen International in Watkins Glen, New York
- Course: Permanent racing facility
- Course length: 2.454 miles (3.949 km)
- Distance: 82 laps, 201.288 mi (323.845 km)
- Average speed: 92.640 miles per hour (149.090 km/h)

Pole position
Driver	Rajah Caruth	JR Motorsports
- Grid positions set by competition-based formula

Most laps led
Driver	Brent Crews	Joe Gibbs Racing
- Laps: 32

Fastest lap
Driver	Brent Crews	Joe Gibbs Racing
- Time: 1:11.934

Winner
No. 1	Connor Zilisch	JR Motorsports

Television in the United States
- Network: The CW
- Announcers: Adam Alexander, Jamie McMurray, and Parker Kligerman

Radio in the United States
- Radio: MRN
- Booth announcers: Alex Hayden and Todd Gordon
- Turn announcers: Dave Moody (Esses), Kyle Rickey (Turn 5) and Dan Hubbard (Turns 6–7)

The 2026 Mission 200 at The Glen was a NASCAR O'Reilly Auto Parts Series race held on Saturday, May 9, 2026, at Watkins Glen International in Watkins Glen, New York. Contested over 82 laps on the 2.45-mile (3.94 km) road course, it was the 13th race of the 2026 NASCAR O'Reilly Auto Parts Series season, and the 30th running of the event.

Connor Zilisch, driving for JR Motorsports, made a last lap, final corner pass on Jesse Love in a thrilling finish to earn his 13th career NASCAR O'Reilly Auto Parts Series win, his second of the season, and his third consecutive win at Watkins Glen. Rookie Brent Crews dominated the majority of the race, winning the first stage and led a race-high 32 laps, along with earning the fastest lap, but finished in sixth after late pit road troubles. Love finished second after staying out on fuel mileage, and Taylor Gray finished third. Ross Chastain and Brandon Jones rounded out the top five, while Crews, Parker Retzlaff, Shane van Gisbergen, Austin Green, and Justin Allgaier rounded out the top ten.

== Report ==
=== Background ===
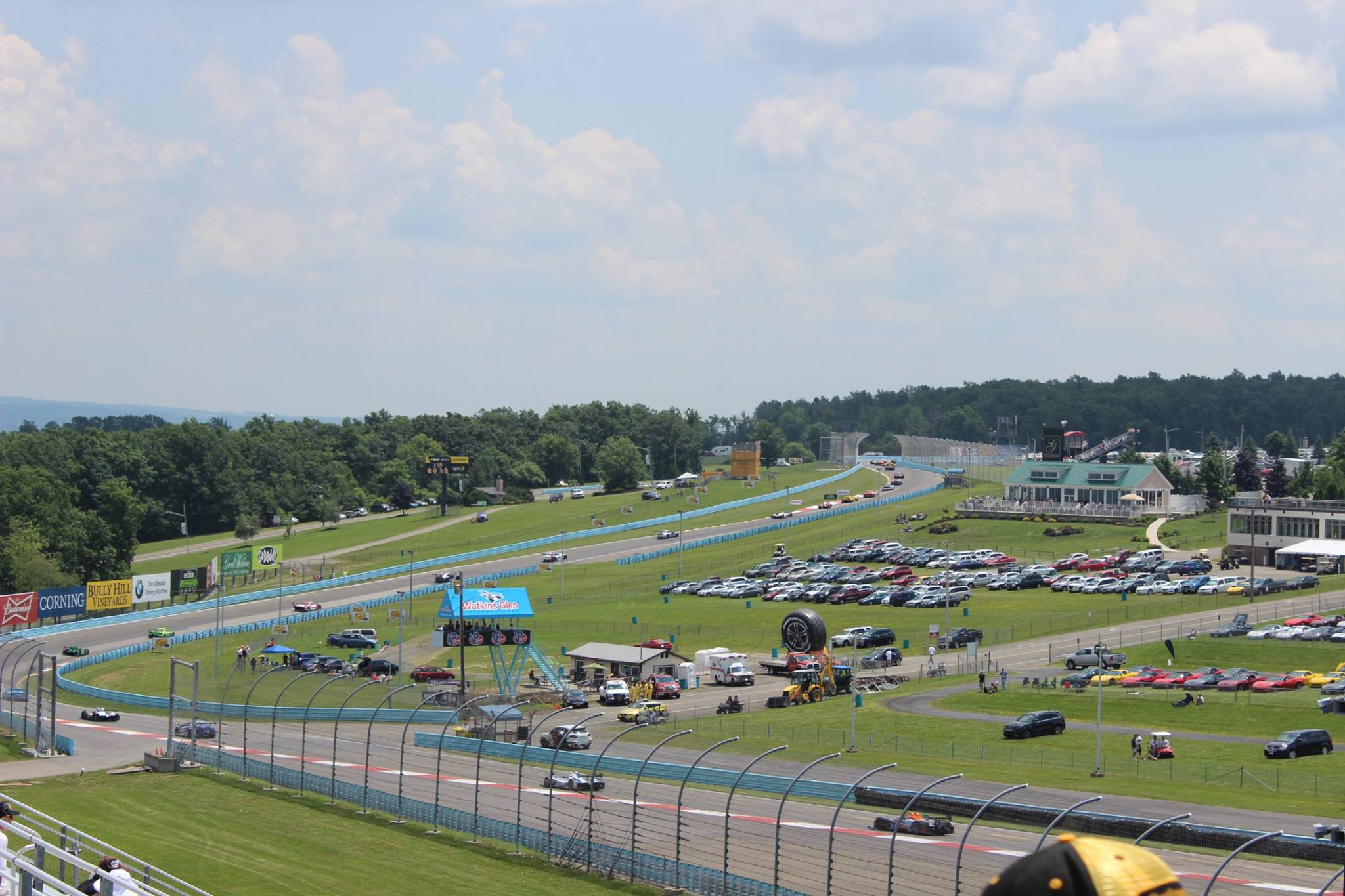
Watkins Glen International, the track where the race was held.

Watkins Glen International (nicknamed "The Glen") is an automobile race track located in Watkins Glen, New York at the southern tip of Seneca Lake. It was long known around the world as the home of the Formula One United States Grand Prix, which it hosted for twenty consecutive years (1961–1980), but the site has been home to road racing of nearly every class, including the World Sportscar Championship, Trans-Am, Can-Am, NASCAR Cup Series, the International Motor Sports Association and the IndyCar Series.

Initially, public roads in the village were used for the race course. In 1956 a permanent circuit for the race was built. In 1968 the race was extended to six hours, becoming the 6 Hours of Watkins Glen. The circuit's current layout has more or less been the same since 1971, although a chicane was installed at the uphill Esses in 1975 to slow cars through these corners, where there was a fatality during practice at the 1973 United States Grand Prix. The chicane was removed in 1985, but another chicane called the "Inner Loop" was installed in 1992 after J.D. McDuffie's fatal accident during the previous year's NASCAR Winston Cup event.

==== Entry list ====
- (R) denotes rookie driver.
- (i) denotes driver who is ineligible for series driver points.

#	Driver	Team	Make
00	Sheldon Creed	Haas Factory Team	Chevrolet
0	Alex Labbé	SS-Green Light Racing	Chevrolet
1	Connor Zilisch (i)	JR Motorsports	Chevrolet
02	Ryan Ellis	Young's Motorsports	Chevrolet
2	Jesse Love	Richard Childress Racing	Chevrolet
07	Josh Bilicki	SS-Green Light Racing	Chevrolet
7	Justin Allgaier	JR Motorsports	Chevrolet
8	Sammy Smith	JR Motorsports	Chevrolet
9	Shane van Gisbergen (i)	JR Motorsports	Chevrolet
17	Corey Day	Hendrick Motorsports	Chevrolet
18	William Sawalich	Joe Gibbs Racing	Toyota
19	Brent Crews (R)	Joe Gibbs Racing	Toyota
20	Brandon Jones	Joe Gibbs Racing	Toyota
21	Austin Hill	Richard Childress Racing	Chevrolet
24	Harrison Burton	Sam Hunt Racing	Toyota
26	Dean Thompson	Sam Hunt Racing	Toyota
27	Jeb Burton	Jordan Anderson Racing	Chevrolet
28	Kyle Sieg	RSS Racing	Chevrolet
31	Blaine Perkins	Jordan Anderson Racing	Chevrolet
32	Ross Chastain (i)	Jordan Anderson Racing	Chevrolet
35	Matt Wilson	Joey Gase Motorsports	Chevrolet
39	Ryan Sieg	RSS Racing	Chevrolet
41	Sam Mayer	Haas Factory Team	Chevrolet
42	Will Rodgers	Young's Motorsports	Chevrolet
44	Brennan Poole	Alpha Prime Racing	Chevrolet
45	Lavar Scott (R)	Alpha Prime Racing	Chevrolet
48	Patrick Staropoli (R)	Big Machine Racing	Chevrolet
50	Preston Pardus	Pardus Racing Inc.	Chevrolet
51	Jeremy Clements	Jeremy Clements Racing	Chevrolet
53	Derek White	Joey Gase Motorsports	Chevrolet
54	Taylor Gray	Joe Gibbs Racing	Toyota
55	Glen Reen	Joey Gase Motorsports	Toyota
87	Austin Green	Peterson Racing	Chevrolet
88	Rajah Caruth	JR Motorsports	Chevrolet
91	Carson Kvapil	DGM Racing	Chevrolet
92	Alex Guenette	DGM Racing	Chevrolet
96	Anthony Alfredo	Viking Motorsports	Chevrolet
99	Parker Retzlaff	Viking Motorsports	Chevrolet
Official entry list

== Practice ==
The first and only practice session was held on Saturday, May 9, at 10:45 AM EST, and lasted for 1 hour and 30 minutes, extended from 50 minutes due to the cancellation of qualifying.

Brent Crews, driving for Joe Gibbs Racing, set the fastest time in the session, with a lap of 1:12.193 seconds, and a speed of 122.173 miles per hour (196.618 km/h).

=== Practice results ===
Pos.	#	Driver	Team	Make	Time	Speed
1	19	Brent Crews (R)	Joe Gibbs Racing	Toyota	1:12.193	122.173
2	1	Connor Zilisch (i)	JR Motorsports	Chevrolet	1:12.266	122.049
3	9	Shane van Gisbergen (i)	JR Motorsports	Chevrolet	1:12.901	120.986
Full practice results

== Starting lineup ==
Qualifying was originally scheduled to be held on Saturday, May 9, at 11:35 AM EST, but was cancelled due to inclement weather. Rajah Caruth, driving for JR Motorsports, was awarded the pole position as a result of NASCAR's pandemic formula with a score of 1.300.

=== Starting lineup ===
Pos.	#	Driver	Team	Make
1	88	Rajah Caruth	JR Motorsports	Chevrolet
2	7	Justin Allgaier	JR Motorsports	Chevrolet
3	00	Sheldon Creed	Haas Factory Team	Chevrolet
4	19	Brent Crews (R)	Joe Gibbs Racing	Toyota
5	41	Sam Mayer	Haas Factory Team	Chevrolet
6	99	Parker Retzlaff	Viking Motorsports	Chevrolet
7	20	Brandon Jones	Joe Gibbs Racing	Toyota
8	2	Jesse Love	Richard Childress Racing	Chevrolet
9	21	Austin Hill	Richard Childress Racing	Chevrolet
10	8	Sammy Smith	JR Motorsports	Chevrolet
11	51	Jeremy Clements	Jeremy Clements Racing	Chevrolet
12	9	Shane van Gisbergen (i)	JR Motorsports	Chevrolet
13	39	Ryan Sieg	RSS Racing	Chevrolet
14	18	William Sawalich	Joe Gibbs Racing	Toyota
15	96	Anthony Alfredo	Viking Motorsports	Chevrolet
16	26	Dean Thompson	Sam Hunt Racing	Toyota
17	1	Connor Zilisch (i)	JR Motorsports	Chevrolet
18	44	Brennan Poole	Alpha Prime Racing	Chevrolet
19	48	Patrick Staropoli (R)	Big Machine Racing	Chevrolet
20	45	Lavar Scott (R)	Alpha Prime Racing	Chevrolet
21	92	Alex Guenette	DGM Racing	Chevrolet
22	24	Harrison Burton	Sam Hunt Racing	Toyota
23	27	Jeb Burton	Jordan Anderson Racing	Chevrolet
24	31	Blaine Perkins	Jordan Anderson Racing	Chevrolet
25	54	Taylor Gray	Joe Gibbs Racing	Toyota
26	07	Josh Bilicki	SS-Green Light Racing	Chevrolet
27	17	Corey Day	Hendrick Motorsports	Chevrolet
28	02	Ryan Ellis	Young's Motorsports	Chevrolet
29	32	Ross Chastain (i)	Jordan Anderson Racing	Chevrolet
30	0	Alex Labbé	SS-Green Light Racing	Chevrolet
31	53	Derek White	Joey Gase Motorsports	Chevrolet
32	55	Glen Reen	Joey Gase Motorsports	Toyota
Qualified by owner's points
33	28	Kyle Sieg	RSS Racing	Chevrolet
34	91	Carson Kvapil	DGM Racing	Chevrolet
35	87	Austin Green	Peterson Racing	Chevrolet
36	42	Will Rodgers	Young's Motorsports	Chevrolet
37	35	Matt Wilson	Joey Gase Motorsports	Chevrolet
38	50	Preston Pardus	Pardus Racing	Chevrolet
Official starting lineup

== Race ==
=== Race results ===
==== Stage Results ====
Stage One Laps: 20

Pos.	#	Driver	Team	Make	Pts
1	19	Brent Crews (R)	Joe Gibbs Racing	Toyota	10
2	41	Sam Mayer	Haas Factory Team	Chevrolet	9
3	7	Justin Allgaier	JR Motorsports	Chevrolet	8
4	2	Jesse Love	Richard Childress Racing	Chevrolet	7
5	20	Brandon Jones	Joe Gibbs Racing	Toyota	6
6	21	Austin Hill	Richard Childress Racing	Chevrolet	5
7	88	Rajah Caruth	JR Motorsports	Chevrolet	4
8	99	Parker Retzlaff	Viking Motorsports	Chevrolet	3
9	32	Ross Chastain (i)	Jordan Anderson Racing	Chevrolet	0
10	39	Ryan Sieg	RSS Racing	Chevrolet	1

Stage Two Laps: 20

Pos.	#	Driver	Team	Make	Pts
1	1	Connor Zilisch (i)	JR Motorsports	Chevrolet	0
2	19	Brent Crews (R)	Joe Gibbs Racing	Toyota	9
3	9	Shane van Gisbergen (i)	JR Motorsports	Chevrolet	8
4	7	Justin Allgaier	JR Motorsports	Chevrolet	7
5	2	Jesse Love	Richard Childress Racing	Chevrolet	6
6	54	Taylor Gray	Joe Gibbs Racing	Toyota	5
7	21	Austin Hill	Richard Childress Racing	Chevrolet	4
8	41	Sam Mayer	Haas Factory Team	Chevrolet	3
9	8	Sammy Smith	JR Motorsports	Chevrolet	2
10	20	Brandon Jones	Joe Gibbs Racing	Toyota	1

=== Final Stage Results ===
Stage Three Laps: 42

Fin	St	#	Driver	Team	Make	Laps	Led	Status	Pts
1	17	1	Connor Zilisch (i)	JR Motorsports	Chevrolet	82	20	Running	0
2	8	2	Jesse Love	Richard Childress Racing	Chevrolet	82	18	Running	48
3	25	54	Taylor Gray	Joe Gibbs Racing	Toyota	82	0	Running	39
4	29	32	Ross Chastain (i)	Jordan Anderson Racing	Chevrolet	82	0	Running	0
5	7	20	Brandon Jones	Joe Gibbs Racing	Toyota	82	0	Running	39
6	4	19	Brent Crews (R)	Joe Gibbs Racing	Toyota	82	32	Running	51
7	6	99	Parker Retzlaff	Viking Motorsports	Chevrolet	82	0	Running	33
8	12	9	Shane van Gisbergen (i)	JR Motorsports	Chevrolet	82	7	Running	0
9	35	87	Austin Green	Peterson Racing	Chevrolet	82	0	Running	28
10	2	7	Justin Allgaier	JR Motorsports	Chevrolet	82	0	Running	42
11	9	21	Austin Hill	Richard Childress Racing	Chevrolet	82	0	Running	35
12	1	88	Rajah Caruth	JR Motorsports	Chevrolet	82	2	Running	29
13	5	41	Sam Mayer	Haas Factory Team	Chevrolet	82	3	Running	36
14	34	91	Carson Kvapil	DGM Racing	Chevrolet	82	0	Running	23
15	17	17	Corey Day	Hendrick Motorsports	Chevrolet	82	0	Running	22
16	10	8	Sammy Smith	JR Motorsports	Chevrolet	82	0	Running	23
17	22	24	Harrison Burton	Sam Hunt Racing	Toyota	82	0	Running	20
18	18	44	Brennan Poole	Alpha Prime Racing	Chevrolet	82	0	Running	19
19	30	0	Alex Labbé	SS-Green Light Racing	Chevrolet	82	0	Running	18
20	36	42	Will Rodgers	Young's Motorsports	Chevrolet	82	0	Running	17
21	38	50	Preston Pardus	Pardus Racing	Chevrolet	82	0	Running	16
22	26	07	Josh Bilicki	SS-Green Light Racing	Chevrolet	82	0	Running	15
23	13	39	Ryan Sieg	RSS Racing	Chevrolet	82	0	Running	15
24	15	96	Anthony Alfredo	Viking Motorsports	Chevrolet	82	0	Running	13
25	23	27	Jeb Burton	Jordan Anderson Racing	Chevrolet	82	0	Running	12
26	24	31	Blaine Perkins	Jordan Anderson Racing	Chevrolet	81	0	Out of Fuel	11
27	20	45	Lavar Scott (R)	Alpha Prime Racing	Chevrolet	81	0	Out of Fuel	10
28	21	92	Alex Guenette	DGM Racing	Chevrolet	81	0	Running	9
29	3	00	Sheldon Creed	Haas Factory Team	Chevrolet	81	0	Running	8
30	32	55	Glen Reen	Joey Gase Motorsports	Toyota	81	0	Running	7
31	33	28	Kyle Sieg	RSS Racing	Chevrolet	81	0	Running	6
32	31	53	Derek White	Joey Gase Motorsports	Chevrolet	78	0	Running	5
33	11	51	Jeremy Clements	Jeremy Clements Racing	Chevrolet	74	0	Running	4
34	28	02	Ryan Ellis	Young's Motorsports	Chevrolet	72	0	Suspension	3
35	16	26	Dean Thompson	Sam Hunt Racing	Toyota	54	0	Transmission	2
36	14	18	William Sawalich	Joe Gibbs Racing	Toyota	15	0	Engine	1
37	37	35	Matt Wilson	Joey Gase Motorsports	Chevrolet	5	0	Accident	1
38	19	48	Patrick Staropoli (R)	Big Machine Racing	Chevrolet	4	0	Engine	1
Official race results

=== Race statistics ===
- Lead changes: 13 among 6 different drivers
- Cautions/Laps: 5 for 13 laps
- Red flags: 0
- Time of race: 2 hours, 10 minutes and 7 seconds
- Average speed: 92.640 miles per hour (149.090 km/h)

== Standings after the race ==
Drivers' Championship standings

	Pos	Driver	Points
	1	Justin Allgaier	640
	2	Sheldon Creed	485 (–155)
	3	Jesse Love	479 (–161)
1	4	Brandon Jones	433 (–207)
1	5	Corey Day	422 (–218)
	6	Sammy Smith	399 (–241)
	7	Austin Hill	392 (–248)
	8	Carson Kvapil	380 (–260)
	9	Parker Retzlaff	362 (–278)
	10	Taylor Gray	345 (–295)
3	11	Brent Crews	324 (–316)
	12	Sam Mayer	321 (–319)
Official driver's standings

Manufacturers' Championship standings

Pos	Manufacturer	Points
1	Chevrolet	674
2	Toyota	438 (–236)
3	Ford	182 (–492)

- Note: Only the first 12 positions are included for the driver standings.

Previous race: 2026 Andy's Frozen Custard 340	NASCAR O'Reilly Auto Parts Series; 2026 season	Next race: 2026 BetRivers 200
