= 2026 Winn-Dixie 250 =

NASCAR O'Reilly Auto Parts Series race at Daytona International Speedway

2026 Winn-Dixie 250 Powered by Coca-Cola
Race details
- Race 24 of 33 in the 2026 NASCAR O'Reilly Auto Parts Series
- Date: August 28, 2026
- Location: Daytona International Speedway in Daytona Beach, Florida
- Course: Permanent racing facility
- Course length: 2.5 miles (4 km)
- Distance: 105 laps, 262.5 mi (422.452 km)
- Scheduled distance: 100 laps, 250 mi (402.336 km)
- Average speed: 132.520 miles per hour (213.270 km/h)

Pole position
Driver	Rajah Caruth	JR Motorsports
- Time: 49.118

Most laps led
Driver	Carson Kvapil	JR Motorsports
- Laps: 50

Fastest lap
Driver	Sam Mayer	Haas Factory Team
- Time: 46.913

Winner
No. 38	Ryan Sieg	RSS Racing

Television in the United States
- Network: The CW
- Announcers: Adam Alexander, Jamie McMurray, and Parker Kligerman

Radio in the United States
- Radio: MRN
- Booth announcers: Alex Hayden, Mike Bagley, and Todd Gordon
- Turn announcers: Dave Moody (1 & 2), Kyle Rickey (Backstretch), and Tim Catalfamo (3 & 4)

The 2026 Winn-Dixie 250 Powered by Coca-Cola was a NASCAR O'Reilly Auto Parts Series race held on Friday, August 28, 2026, at Daytona International Speedway in Daytona Beach, Florida. Contested over 105 laps—extended from 100 laps due to an overtime finish on the 2.5-mile (4.0 km) superspeedway, it was the 24th race of the 2026 NASCAR O'Reilly Auto Parts Series season, and the 25th running of the event.

After a late caution occurred on lap 97, Ryan Sieg, driving for RSS Racing, pulled off the upset, holding off the dominant JR Motorsports cars in the final restart to earn his first career NASCAR O'Reilly Auto Parts Series win in his 424th start. Austin Hill won the first stage, leading 22 laps, while pole-sitter Rajah Caruth won the second stage, leading 11 laps. Carson Kvapil led the race-high 50 laps. At race's end, Hill finished second, and Kvapil finished third. Anthony Alfredo and Brandon Jones rounded out the top five, while Justin Allgaier, Brennan Poole, Harrison Burton, Jeb Burton, and Sheldon Creed rounded out the top ten.

The 2026 Chase field was set; the 12 drivers that qualified were Allgaier, Kvapil, Creed, Jesse Love, Hill, Jones, Corey Day, Sammy Smith, Parker Retzlaff, Sam Mayer, Taylor Gray, and Caruth.

== Report ==
=== Background ===
Daytona International Speedway, the track where the race was held.

The race will be held at Daytona International Speedway, a race track located in Daytona Beach, Florida, United States. Since opening in 1959, the track is the home of the Daytona 500, the most prestigious race in NASCAR. In addition to NASCAR, the track also hosts races of ARCA, AMA Superbike, USCC, SCCA, and Motocross. It features multiple layouts including the primary 2.5 miles (4.0 km) high speed tri-oval, a 3.56 miles (5.73 km) sports car course, a 2.95 miles (4.75 km) motorcycle course, and a .25 miles (0.40 km) karting and motorcycle flat-track. The track's 180-acre (73 ha) infield includes the 29-acre (12 ha) Lake Lloyd, which has hosted powerboat racing. The speedway is owned and operated by International Speedway Corporation.

The track was built in 1959 by NASCAR founder William "Bill" France, Sr. to host racing held at the former Daytona Beach Road Course. His banked design permitted higher speeds and gave fans a better view of the cars. Lights were installed around the track in 1998 and today, it is the third-largest single lit outdoor sports facility. The speedway has been renovated three times, with the infield renovated in 2004 and the track repaved twice — in 1978 and in 2010. On January 22, 2013, the track unveiled artist depictions of a renovated speedway. On July 5 of that year, ground was broken for a project that would remove the backstretch seating and completely redevelop the frontstretch seating. The renovation to the speedway is being worked on by Rossetti Architects. The project, named "Daytona Rising", was completed in January 2016, and it cost US $400 million, placing emphasis on improving fan experience with five expanded and redesigned fan entrances (called "injectors") as well as wider and more comfortable seating with more restrooms and concession stands. After the renovations, the track's grandstands include 101,000 permanent seats with the ability to increase permanent seating to 125,000. The project was completed before the start of Speedweeks.

Winn-Dixie was announced as the title sponsor on July 7.

==== Entry list ====
- (R) denotes rookie driver.
- (i) denotes driver who is ineligible for series driver points.

#	Driver	Team	Make
00	Sheldon Creed	Haas Factory Team	Chevrolet
0	Garrett Smithley	SS-Green Light Racing	Chevrolet
1	Carson Kvapil	JR Motorsports	Chevrolet
02	Ryan Ellis	Young's Motorsports	Chevrolet
2	Jesse Love	Richard Childress Racing	Chevrolet
4	Caesar Bacarella	Alpha Prime Racing	Chevrolet
07	Josh Bilicki	SS-Green Light Racing	Chevrolet
7	Justin Allgaier	JR Motorsports	Chevrolet
8	Sammy Smith	JR Motorsports	Chevrolet
17	Corey Day	Hendrick Motorsports	Chevrolet
18	William Sawalich	Joe Gibbs Racing	Toyota
19	Brent Crews (R)	Joe Gibbs Racing	Toyota
20	Brandon Jones	Joe Gibbs Racing	Toyota
21	Austin Hill	Richard Childress Racing	Chevrolet
24	Harrison Burton	Sam Hunt Racing	Toyota
26	Dean Thompson	Sam Hunt Racing	Toyota
27	Jeb Burton	Jordan Anderson Racing	Chevrolet
28	Kyle Sieg	RSS Racing	Chevrolet
31	Blaine Perkins	Jordan Anderson Racing	Chevrolet
32	Daniel Dye (i)	Jordan Anderson Racing	Chevrolet
38	Ryan Sieg	RSS Racing	Chevrolet
39	Andy Jankowiak	RSS Racing	Ford
41	Sam Mayer	Haas Factory Team	Chevrolet
42	Natalie Decker (i)	Young's Motorsports	Chevrolet
44	Brennan Poole	Alpha Prime Racing	Chevrolet
45	Lavar Scott (R)	Alpha Prime Racing	Chevrolet
47	Dawson Cram	Mike Harmon Racing	Chevrolet
48	Patrick Staropoli (R)	Big Machine Racing	Chevrolet
51	Jeremy Clements	Jeremy Clements Racing	Chevrolet
53	Carson Ware	Joey Gase Motorsports	Chevrolet
54	Taylor Gray	Joe Gibbs Racing	Toyota
55	Joey Gase	Joey Gase Motorsports	Chevrolet
71	Leland Honeyman (i)	DGM Racing	Chevrolet
87	Nick Sanchez	Peterson Racing	Chevrolet
88	Rajah Caruth	JR Motorsports	Chevrolet
91	Mason Maggio	DGM Racing	Chevrolet
92	Josh Williams	DGM Racing	Chevrolet
96	Anthony Alfredo	Viking Motorsports	Chevrolet
99	Parker Retzlaff	Viking Motorsports	Chevrolet
Official entry list

== Qualifying ==
Qualifying was held on Friday, August 28, at 3:00 PM EST. Since Daytona International Speedway is a superspeedway, the qualifying procedure used was a single-car, single-lap system with two rounds. In the first round, drivers had one lap to set a time and determined positions 11–38. The fastest ten drivers from the first round advanced to the second round, and whoever set the fastest time in Round 2 won the pole and determined the rest of the starting lineup.

Rajah Caruth, driving for JR Motorsports, qualified on pole position, having advanced from the preliminary round and setting the fastest time in Round 2, with a lap of 49.118 seconds, and a speed of 183.232 miles per hour (294.883 km/h).

Dawson Cram was the only driver who failed to qualify.

=== Qualifying results ===
Pos.	#	Driver	Team	Make	Time (R1)	Speed (R1)	Time (R2)	Speed (R2)
1	88	Rajah Caruth	JR Motorsports	Chevrolet	49.305	182.537	49.118	183.232
2	1	Carson Kvapil	JR Motorsports	Chevrolet	49.337	182.419	49.219	182.856
3	2	Jesse Love	Richard Childress Racing	Chevrolet	49.489	181.859	49.288	182.600
4	00	Sheldon Creed	Haas Factory Team	Chevrolet	49.516	181.759	49.320	182.482
5	8	Sammy Smith	JR Motorsports	Chevrolet	49.466	181.943	49.332	182.437
6	41	Sam Mayer	Haas Factory Team	Chevrolet	49.368	182.304	49.338	182.415
7	18	William Sawalich	Joe Gibbs Racing	Toyota	49.418	182.120	49.365	182.315
8	21	Austin Hill	Richard Childress Racing	Chevrolet	49.514	181.767	49.392	182.216
9	96	Anthony Alfredo	Viking Motorsports	Chevrolet	49.501	181.815	49.486	181.870
10	54	Taylor Gray	Joe Gibbs Racing	Toyota	49.602	181.444	49.625	181.360
Eliminated in Round 1
11	24	Harrison Burton	Sam Hunt Racing	Toyota	49.609	181.419	—	—
12	38	Ryan Sieg	RSS Racing	Chevrolet	49.610	181.415	—	—
13	20	Brandon Jones	Joe Gibbs Racing	Toyota	49.611	181.411	—	—
14	17	Corey Day	Hendrick Motorsports	Chevrolet	49.612	181.408	—	—
15	87	Nick Sanchez	Peterson Racing	Chevrolet	49.612	181.408	—	—
16	26	Dean Thompson	Sam Hunt Racing	Toyota	49.616	181.393	—	—
17	19	Brent Crews (R)	Joe Gibbs Racing	Toyota	49.664	181.218	—	—
18	7	Justin Allgaier	JR Motorsports	Chevrolet	49.685	181.141	—	—
19	92	Mason Maggio	DGM Racing	Chevrolet	49.697	181.097	—	—
20	71	Leland Honeyman (i)	DGM Racing	Chevrolet	49.782	180.788	—	—
21	4	Caesar Bacarella	Alpha Prime Racing	Chevrolet	49.794	180.745	—	—
22	02	Ryan Ellis	Young's Motorsports	Chevrolet	49.816	180.665	—	—
23	28	Kyle Sieg	RSS Racing	Chevrolet	49.835	180.596	—	—
24	99	Parker Retzlaff	Viking Motorsports	Chevrolet	49.858	180.513	—	—
25	32	Daniel Dye (i)	Jordan Anderson Racing	Chevrolet	49.859	180.509	—	—
26	42	Natalie Decker (i)	Young's Motorsports	Chevrolet	49.867	180.480	—	—
27	0	Garrett Smithley	SS-Green Light Racing	Chevrolet	49.979	180.076	—	—
28	51	Jeremy Clements	Jeremy Clements Racing	Chevrolet	49.981	180.068	—	—
29	27	Jeb Burton	Jordan Anderson Racing	Chevrolet	50.008	179.971	—	—
30	48	Patrick Staropoli (R)	Big Machine Racing	Chevrolet	50.097	179.651	—	—
31	45	Lavar Scott (R)	Alpha Prime Racing	Chevrolet	50.127	179.544	—	—
32	55	Joey Gase	Joey Gase Motorsports	Chevrolet	50.140	179.497	—	—
Qualified by owner's points
33	44	Brennan Poole	Alpha Prime Racing	Chevrolet	50.206	179.261	—	—
34	53	Carson Ware	Joey Gase Motorsports	Chevrolet	50.243	179.129	—	—
35	91	Mason Maggio	DGM Racing	Chevrolet	50.250	179.104	—	—
36	31	Blaine Perkins	Jordan Anderson Racing	Chevrolet	50.254	179.090	—	—
37	07	Josh Bilicki	SS-Green Light Racing	Chevrolet	50.413	178.525	—	—
38	39	Andy Jankowiak	RSS Racing	Ford	51.302	175.432	—	—
Failed to qualify
39	47	Dawson Cram	Mike Harmon Racing	Chevrolet	51.294	175.459	—	—
Official qualifying results
Official starting lineup

== Race ==
=== Race results ===
==== Stage Results ====
Stage One Laps: 30

Pos.	#	Driver	Team	Make	Pts
1	21	Austin Hill	Richard Childress Racing	Chevrolet	10
2	1	Carson Kvapil	JR Motorsports	Chevrolet	9
3	88	Rajah Caruth	JR Motorsports	Chevrolet	8
4	96	Anthony Alfredo	Viking Motorsports	Chevrolet	7
5	8	Sammy Smith	JR Motorsports	Chevrolet	6
6	24	Harrison Burton	Sam Hunt Racing	Toyota	5
7	7	Justin Allgaier	JR Motorsports	Chevrolet	4
8	20	Brandon Jones	Joe Gibbs Racing	Toyota	3
9	18	William Sawalich	Joe Gibbs Racing	Toyota	2
10	54	Taylor Gray	Joe Gibbs Racing	Toyota	1

Stage Two Laps: 30

Pos.	#	Driver	Team	Make	Pts
1	88	Rajah Caruth	JR Motorsports	Chevrolet	10
2	96	Anthony Alfredo	Viking Motorsports	Chevrolet	9
3	1	Carson Kvapil	JR Motorsports	Chevrolet	8
4	7	Justin Allgaier	JR Motorsports	Chevrolet	7
5	27	Jeb Burton	Jordan Anderson Racing	Chevrolet	6
6	00	Sheldon Creed	Haas Factory Team	Chevrolet	5
7	41	Sam Mayer	Haas Factory Team	Chevrolet	4
8	2	Jesse Love	Richard Childress Racing	Chevrolet	3
9	31	Blaine Perkins	Jordan Anderson Racing	Chevrolet	2
10	20	Brandon Jones	Joe Gibbs Racing	Toyota	1

=== Final Stage Results ===
Stage Three Laps: 45

Fin	St	#	Driver	Team	Make	Laps	Led	Status	Pts
1	12	38	Ryan Sieg	RSS Racing	Chevrolet	105	2	Running	55
2	8	21	Austin Hill	Richard Childress Racing	Chevrolet	105	22	Running	45
3	2	1	Carson Kvapil	JR Motorsports	Chevrolet	105	50	Running	51
4	9	96	Anthony Alfredo	Viking Motorsports	Chevrolet	105	2	Running	49
5	13	20	Brandon Jones	Joe Gibbs Racing	Toyota	105	5	Running	36
6	18	7	Justin Allgaier	JR Motorsports	Chevrolet	105	0	Running	42
7	33	44	Brennan Poole	Alpha Prime Racing	Chevrolet	105	0	Running	30
8	11	24	Harrison Burton	Sam Hunt Racing	Toyota	105	1	Running	34
9	29	27	Jeb Burton	Jordan Anderson Racing	Chevrolet	105	0	Running	34
10	4	00	Sheldon Creed	Haas Factory Team	Chevrolet	105	3	Running	32
11	19	92	Josh Williams	DGM Racing	Chevrolet	105	0	Running	26
12	27	0	Garrett Smithley	SS-Green Light Racing	Chevrolet	105	0	Running	25
13	20	71	Leland Honeyman (i)	DGM Racing	Chevrolet	105	0	Running	0
14	24	99	Parker Retzlaff	Viking Motorsports	Chevrolet	105	1	Running	23
15	36	31	Blaine Perkins	Jordan Anderson Racing	Chevrolet	105	0	Running	24
16	15	87	Nick Sanchez	Peterson Racing	Chevrolet	105	0	Running	21
17	22	02	Ryan Ellis	Young's Motorsports	Chevrolet	105	0	Running	20
18	31	45	Lavar Scott (R)	Alpha Prime Racing	Chevrolet	105	0	Running	19
19	35	91	Mason Maggio	DGM Racing	Chevrolet	105	0	Running	18
20	3	2	Jesse Love	Richard Childress Racing	Chevrolet	105	3	Running	20
21	23	28	Kyle Sieg	RSS Racing	Chevrolet	105	0	Running	16
22	26	42	Natalie Decker (i)	Young's Motorsports	Chevrolet	105	0	Running	0
23	32	55	Joey Gase	Joey Gase Motorsports	Chevrolet	105	0	Running	14
24	34	53	Carson Ware	Joey Gase Motorsports	Chevrolet	105	0	Running	13
25	6	41	Sam Mayer	Haas Factory Team	Chevrolet	105	5	Running	17
26	10	54	Taylor Gray	Joe Gibbs Racing	Toyota	105	0	Running	12
27	16	26	Dean Thompson	Sam Hunt Racing	Toyota	105	0	Running	10
28	37	07	Josh Bilicki	SS-Green Light Racing	Chevrolet	104	0	Accident	9
29	14	17	Corey Day	JR Motorsports	Chevrolet	104	0	Running	8
30	38	39	Andy Jankowiak	RSS Racing	Ford	103	0	Running	7
31	21	4	Caesar Bacarella	Alpha Prime Racing	Chevrolet	103	0	Running	6
32	1	88	Rajah Caruth	JR Motorsports	Chevrolet	103	11	Running	23
33	28	51	Jeremy Clements	Jeremy Clements Racing	Chevrolet	94	0	Running	4
34	30	48	Patrick Staropoli (R)	Big Machine Racing	Chevrolet	73	0	Running	3
35	17	19	Brent Crews (R)	Joe Gibbs Racing	Toyota	61	0	Running	2
36	5	8	Sammy Smith	JR Motorsports	Chevrolet	44	0	Accident	7
37	7	18	William Sawalich	Joe Gibbs Racing	Toyota	44	0	Accident	3
38	25	32	Daniel Dye (i)	Jordan Anderson Racing	Chevrolet	27	0	Accident	0
Official race results

=== Race statistics ===
- Lead changes: 21 among 11 different drivers
- Cautions/Laps: 4 for 25 laps
- Red flags: 0
- Time of race: 1 hour, 58 minutes and 51 seconds
- Average speed: 132.520 miles per hour (213.270 km/h)

== Standings after the race ==
Drivers' Championship standings

	Pos	Driver	Points
	1	Justin Allgaier	2,100
	2	Carson Kvapil	2,075 (–25)
	3	Sheldon Creed	2,065 (–35)
	4	Jesse Love	2,060 (–40)
2	5	Austin Hill	2,055 (–45)
	6	Brandon Jones	2,050 (–50)
2	7	Corey Day	2,045 (–55)
	8	Sammy Smith	2,040 (–60)
	9	Parker Retzlaff	2,035 (–65)
	10	Sam Mayer	2,030 (–70)
2	11	Taylor Gray	2,025 (–75)
2	12	Rajah Caruth	2,020 (–80)
Official driver's standings

Manufacturers' Championship standings

Pos	Manufacturer	Points
1	Chevrolet	1,259
2	Toyota	829 (–430)
3	Ford	215 (–1,044)

- Note: Only the first 12 positions are included for the driver standings.

Previous race: 2026 Hy-Vee PERKS 250	NASCAR O'Reilly Auto Parts Series; 2026 season	Next race: 2026 Fleetio 200
