= 2025 Pit Boss/FoodMaxx 250 =

19th race of the 2025 NASCAR Xfinity Series

Race details
- Race 19 of 33 of the 2025 NASCAR Xfinity Series
- Date: July 12, 2025
- Location: Sonoma Raceway in Sonoma, California
- Course: Permanent racing facility
- Course length: 1.99 miles (3.20 km)
- Distance: 79 laps, 156 mi (251 km)
- Scheduled distance: 79 laps, 156 mi (251 km)
- Average speed: 81.176 mph (130.640 km/h)

Pole position
Driver	Shane Van Gisbergen	JR Motorsports
- Time: 1:15.259

Most laps led
Driver	Connor Zilisch	JR Motorsports
- Laps: 46

Winner
No. 88	Connor Zilisch	JR Motorsports

Television in the United States
- Network: The CW
- Announcers: Adam Alexander, Christopher Bell, and Parker Kligerman

Radio in the United States
- Radio: PRN

The 2025 Pit Boss/FoodMaxx 250 was the 19th stock car race of the 2025 NASCAR Xfinity Series, and the 3rd iteration of the event. The race was held on Saturday, July 12, 2025, in Sonoma, California at Sonoma Raceway, a 1.99 miles (3.20 km) permanent road course.

The race, contested over 79 laps, was won by Connor Zilisch, driving for JR Motorsports, which was his third win of the year, and his fourth career NASCAR Xfinity Series win. Zilisch fended off a hard-charging Shane van Gisbergen, driving for JR Motorsports, who nearly passed him after the two drivers made contact on the final lap in turn 7. To fill out the podium, William Sawalich, driving for Joe Gibbs Racing, finished 3rd, respectively.

== Report ==
=== Background ===
Layout of Sonoma Raceway, the track where the race was held.

Sonoma Raceway is a 1.99-mile (3.20 km) road course and drag strip located on the landform known as Sears Point in the southern Sonoma Mountains in Sonoma, California, U.S. The road course features 12 turns on a hilly course with 160 feet (49 m) of total elevation change. It is host to one of only seven NASCAR Cup Series races each year that are run on road courses. It is also host to the NTT IndyCar Series and several other auto races and motorcycle races such as the American Federation of Motorcyclists series. Sonoma Raceway continues to host amateur, or club racing events which may or may not be open to the general public. The largest such car club is the Sports Car Club of America. In 2022, the race was reverted to racing the club configuration.

==== Entry list ====
- (R) denotes rookie driver.
- (i) denotes driver who is ineligible for series driver points.

#	Driver	Team	Make
00	Sheldon Creed	Haas Factory Team	Ford
1	Carson Kvapil (R)	JR Motorsports	Chevrolet
2	Jesse Love	Richard Childress Racing	Chevrolet
4	Parker Retzlaff	Alpha Prime Racing	Chevrolet
5	Kris Wright	Our Motorsports	Chevrolet
07	Alex Labbé	SS-Green Light Racing	Chevrolet
7	Justin Allgaier	JR Motorsports	Chevrolet
8	Sammy Smith	JR Motorsports	Chevrolet
9	Shane van Gisbergen (i)	JR Motorsports	Chevrolet
10	Daniel Dye (R)	Kaulig Racing	Chevrolet
11	Josh Williams	Kaulig Racing	Chevrolet
14	Connor Mosack (i)	SS-Green Light Racing	Chevrolet
16	Christian Eckes (R)	Kaulig Racing	Chevrolet
17	Corey Day	Hendrick Motorsports	Chevrolet
18	William Sawalich (R)	Joe Gibbs Racing	Toyota
19	Riley Herbst (i)	Joe Gibbs Racing	Toyota
20	Brandon Jones	Joe Gibbs Racing	Toyota
21	Austin Hill	Richard Childress Racing	Chevrolet
25	Harrison Burton	AM Racing	Ford
26	Dean Thompson (R)	Sam Hunt Racing	Toyota
27	Jeb Burton	Jordan Anderson Racing	Chevrolet
28	Kyle Sieg	RSS Racing	Ford
31	Blaine Perkins	Jordan Anderson Racing	Chevrolet
32	Austin Green	Jordan Anderson Racing	Chevrolet
35	Austin J. Hill	Joey Gase Motorsports	Chevrolet
39	Ryan Sieg	RSS Racing	Ford
41	Sam Mayer	Haas Factory Team	Ford
42	Anthony Alfredo	Young's Motorsports	Chevrolet
44	Brennan Poole	Alpha Prime Racing	Chevrolet
45	Brad Perez	Alpha Prime Racing	Chevrolet
48	Nick Sanchez (R)	Big Machine Racing	Chevrolet
51	Jeremy Clements	Jeremy Clements Racing	Chevrolet
53	Sage Karam	Joey Gase Motorsports	Toyota
54	Taylor Gray (R)	Joe Gibbs Racing	Toyota
70	Will Rodgers	Cope Family Racing	Chevrolet
71	Ryan Ellis	DGM Racing	Chevrolet
88	Connor Zilisch (R)	JR Motorsports	Chevrolet
91	Josh Bilicki	DGM Racing	Chevrolet
99	Matt DiBenedetto	Viking Motorsports	Chevrolet
Official entry list

== Practice ==
The first and only practice session was held on Friday, July 11, at 1:00 PM PST, and would last for 50 minutes. Connor Zilisch, driving for JR Motorsports, would set the fastest time in the session, with a lap of 1:15.271, and a speed of 95.176 mph (153.171 km/h).

Pos.	#	Driver	Team	Make	Time	Speed
1	88	Connor Zilisch (R)	JR Motorsports	Chevrolet	1:15.271	95.176
2	2	Jesse Love	Richard Childress Racing	Chevrolet	1:15.896	94.392
3	9	Shane van Gisbergen (i)	JR Motorsports	Chevrolet	1:16.134	94.097
Full practice results

== Qualifying ==
Qualifying was held on Friday, July 11, at 2:10 PM PST. Since Sonoma Raceway is a road course, the qualifying procedure used is a two-group system with one round. Drivers will be separated into two groups, A and B. Each driver will have multiple laps to set a time. Whoever sets the fastest time between both groups will win the pole.

Under a 2021 rule change, the timing line in road course qualifying is "not" the start-finish line. Instead, the timing line for qualifying will be set at the exit of Turn 10. Shane van Gisbergen, driving for JR Motorsports, would score the pole for the race, with a lap of 1:15.259, and a speed of 95.191 mph (153.195 km/h).

Austin J. Hill was the only driver who failed to qualify.

=== Qualifying results ===
Pos.	#	Driver	Team	Make	Time	Speed
1	9	Shane van Gisbergen (i)	JR Motorsports	Chevrolet	1:15.259	95.191
2	88	Connor Zilisch (R)	JR Motorsports	Chevrolet	1:15.503	94.884
3	41	Sam Mayer	Haas Factory Team	Ford	1:15.644	94.707
4	2	Jesse Love	Richard Childress Racing	Chevrolet	1:15.839	94.463
5	18	William Sawalich (R)	Joe Gibbs Racing	Toyota	1:15.881	94.411
6	8	Sammy Smith	JR Motorsports	Chevrolet	1:15.890	94.400
7	1	Carson Kvapil (R)	JR Motorsports	Chevrolet	1:16.168	94.055
8	20	Brandon Jones	Joe Gibbs Racing	Toyota	1:16.193	94.024
9	00	Sheldon Creed	Haas Factory Team	Ford	1:16.208	94.006
10	7	Justin Allgaier	JR Motorsports	Chevrolet	1:16.270	93.929
11	54	Taylor Gray (R)	Joe Gibbs Racing	Toyota	1:16.281	93.916
12	31	Blaine Perkins	Jordan Anderson Racing	Chevrolet	1:16.339	93.845
13	42	Anthony Alfredo	Young's Motorsports	Chevrolet	1:16.372	93.804
14	17	Corey Day	Hendrick Motorsports	Chevrolet	1:16.432	93.730
15	19	Riley Herbst (i)	Joe Gibbs Racing	Toyota	1:16.439	93.722
16	21	Austin Hill	Richard Childress Racing	Chevrolet	1:16.502	93.645
17	27	Jeb Burton	Jordan Anderson Racing	Chevrolet	1:16.630	93.488
18	11	Josh Williams	Kaulig Racing	Chevrolet	1:16.785	93.299
19	25	Harrison Burton	AM Racing	Ford	1:16.809	93.270
20	07	Alex Labbé	SS-Green Light Racing	Chevrolet	1:16.895	93.166
21	16	Christian Eckes (R)	Kaulig Racing	Chevrolet	1:17.046	92.983
22	14	Connor Mosack (i)	SS-Green Light Racing	Chevrolet	1:17.075	92.948
23	48	Nick Sanchez (R)	Big Machine Racing	Chevrolet	1:17.137	92.874
24	99	Matt DiBenedetto	Viking Motorsports	Chevrolet	1:17.194	92.805
25	91	Josh Bilicki	DGM Racing	Chevrolet	1:17.237	92.753
26	53	Sage Karam	Joey Gase Motorsports	Toyota	1:17.270	92.714
27	71	Ryan Ellis	DGM Racing	Chevrolet	1:17.312	92.663
28	5	Kris Wright	Our Motorsports	Chevrolet	1:17.355	92.612
29	39	Ryan Sieg	RSS Racing	Ford	1:17.365	92.600
30	51	Jeremy Clements	Jeremy Clements Racing	Chevrolet	1:17.369	92.595
31	10	Daniel Dye (R)	Kaulig Racing	Chevrolet	1:17.390	92.570
32	44	Brennan Poole	Alpha Prime Racing	Chevrolet	1:17.478	92.465
Qualified by owner's points
33	32	Austin Green	Jordan Anderson Racing	Chevrolet	1:17.559	92.368
34	4	Parker Retzlaff	Alpha Prime Racing	Chevrolet	1:17.574	92.351
35	26	Dean Thompson (R)	Sam Hunt Racing	Toyota	1:17.591	92.330
36	70	Will Rodgers	Cope Family Racing	Chevrolet	1:17.696	92.206
37	28	Kyle Sieg	RSS Racing	Ford	1:18.073	91.760
38	45	Brad Perez	Alpha Prime Racing	Chevrolet	1:18.566	91.184
Failed to qualify
39	35	Austin J. Hill	Joey Gase Motorsports	Chevrolet	1:18.672	91.062
Official qualifying results
Official starting lineup

== Race results ==
Stage 1 Laps: 20

Pos.	#	Driver	Team	Make	Pts
1	41	Sam Mayer	Haas Factory Team	Ford	10
2	20	Brandon Jones	Joe Gibbs Racing	Toyota	9
3	1	Carson Kvapil (R)	JR Motorsports	Chevrolet	8
4	8	Sammy Smith	JR Motorsports	Chevrolet	7
5	00	Sheldon Creed	Haas Factory Team	Ford	6
6	42	Anthony Alfredo	Young's Motorsports	Chevrolet	5
7	07	Alex Labbé	SS-Green Light Racing	Chevrolet	4
8	31	Blaine Perkins	Jordan Anderson Racing	Chevrolet	3
9	88	Connor Zilisch (R)	JR Motorsports	Chevrolet	2
10	39	Ryan Sieg	RSS Racing	Ford	1

Stage 2 Laps: 25

Pos.	#	Driver	Team	Make	Pts
1	20	Brandon Jones	Joe Gibbs Racing	Toyota	10
2	7	Justin Allgaier	JR Motorsports	Chevrolet	9
3	8	Sammy Smith	JR Motorsports	Chevrolet	8
4	00	Sheldon Creed	Haas Factory Team	Ford	7
5	1	Carson Kvapil (R)	JR Motorsports	Chevrolet	6
6	31	Blaine Perkins	Jordan Anderson Racing	Chevrolet	5
7	88	Connor Zilisch (R)	JR Motorsports	Chevrolet	4
8	27	Jeb Burton	Jordan Anderson Racing	Chevrolet	3
9	70	Will Rodgers	Cope Family Racing	Chevrolet	2
10	39	Ryan Sieg	RSS Racing	Ford	1

Stage 3 Laps: 34

Fin.	St	#	Driver	Team	Make	Laps	Led	Status	Points
1	2	88	Connor Zilisch (R)	JR Motorsports	Chevrolet	79	46	Running	46
2	1	9	Shane van Gisbergen (i)	JR Motorsports	Chevrolet	79	24	Running	0
3	5	18	William Sawalich (R)	Joe Gibbs Racing	Toyota	79	0	Running	34
4	23	48	Nick Sanchez (R)	Big Machine Racing	Chevrolet	79	0	Running	33
5	15	19	Riley Herbst (i)	Joe Gibbs Racing	Toyota	79	0	Running	0
6	10	7	Justin Allgaier	JR Motorsports	Chevrolet	79	0	Running	40
7	11	54	Taylor Gray (R)	Joe Gibbs Racing	Toyota	79	0	Running	30
8	7	1	Carson Kvapil (R)	JR Motorsports	Chevrolet	79	0	Running	43
9	6	8	Sammy Smith	JR Motorsports	Chevrolet	79	0	Running	43
10	9	00	Sheldon Creed	Haas Factory Team	Ford	79	0	Running	40
11	33	32	Austin Green	Jordan Anderson Racing	Chevrolet	79	0	Running	26
12	16	21	Austin Hill	Richard Childress Racing	Chevrolet	79	0	Running	25
13	8	20	Brandon Jones	Joe Gibbs Racing	Toyota	79	4	Running	43
14	25	91	Josh Bilicki	DGM Racing	Chevrolet	79	0	Running	23
15	18	11	Josh Williams	Kaulig Racing	Chevrolet	79	0	Running	22
16	36	70	Will Rodgers	Cope Family Racing	Chevrolet	79	0	Running	23
17	3	41	Sam Mayer	Haas Factory Team	Ford	79	5	Running	30
18	35	26	Dean Thompson (R)	Sam Hunt Racing	Toyota	79	0	Running	19
19	12	31	Blaine Perkins	Jordan Anderson Racing	Chevrolet	79	0	Running	26
20	17	27	Jeb Burton	Jordan Anderson Racing	Chevrolet	79	0	Running	20
21	19	25	Harrison Burton	AM Racing	Ford	79	0	Running	16
22	32	44	Brennan Poole	Alpha Prime Racing	Chevrolet	79	0	Running	15
23	13	42	Anthony Alfredo	Young's Motorsports	Chevrolet	79	0	Running	19
24	14	17	Corey Day	Hendrick Motorsports	Chevrolet	79	0	Running	13
25	37	28	Kyle Sieg	RSS Racing	Ford	79	0	Running	12
26	24	99	Matt DiBenedetto	Viking Motorsports	Chevrolet	79	0	Running	11
27	27	71	Ryan Ellis	DGM Racing	Chevrolet	79	0	Running	10
28	34	4	Parker Retzlaff	Alpha Prime Racing	Chevrolet	79	0	Running	9
29	28	5	Kris Wright	Our Motorsports	Chevrolet	79	0	Running	8
30	30	51	Jeremy Clements	Jeremy Clements Racing	Chevrolet	78	0	Running	7
31	38	45	Brad Perez	Alpha Prime Racing	Chevrolet	78	0	Running	6
32	31	10	Daniel Dye (R)	Kaulig Racing	Chevrolet	78	0	Running	5
33	22	14	Connor Mosack (i)	SS-Green Light Racing	Chevrolet	77	0	Running	0
34	21	16	Christian Eckes (R)	Kaulig Racing	Chevrolet	76	0	Running	3
35	29	39	Ryan Sieg	RSS Racing	Ford	76	0	Running	4
36	26	53	Sage Karam	Joey Gase Motorsports	Toyota	40	0	Transmission	1
37	20	07	Alex Labbé	SS-Green Light Racing	Chevrolet	36	0	Suspension	5
38	4	2	Jesse Love	Richard Childress Racing	Chevrolet	11	0	Rear Gear	1
Official race results

Previous race: 2025 The Loop 110	NASCAR Xfinity Series; 2025 season	Next race: 2025 BetRivers 200
