= NASCAR O'Reilly Auto Parts Series at Sonoma Raceway =

NASCAR Xfinity Series race at Sonoma Raceway

Pit Boss/FoodMaxx 250

NASCAR O'Reilly Auto Parts Series
- Venue: Sonoma Raceway
- Location: Sonoma, California
- First race: 2023
- Distance: 157.21 miles (253.00 km)
- Laps: 79; Stage 1: 15; Stage 2: 20; Final stage: 44
- Previous names: DoorDash 250 (2023); Zip Buy Now, Pay Later 250 (2024)
- Most wins (team): JR Motorsports (2)
- Most wins (manufacturer): Chevrolet (3)

Circuit information
- Surface: Asphalt
- Length: 1.990 mi (3.203 km)
- Turns: 12

The Pit Boss/FoodMaxx 250 is a NASCAR O'Reilly Auto Parts Series race that is held at the Sonoma Raceway road course in Sonoma, California. Since its first year in 2023, the race has been held in June on the same weekend as the NASCAR Cup Series race at the track, the Toyota/Save Mart 350, and the ARCA Menards Series West race at the track, the General Tire 200.

== History ==
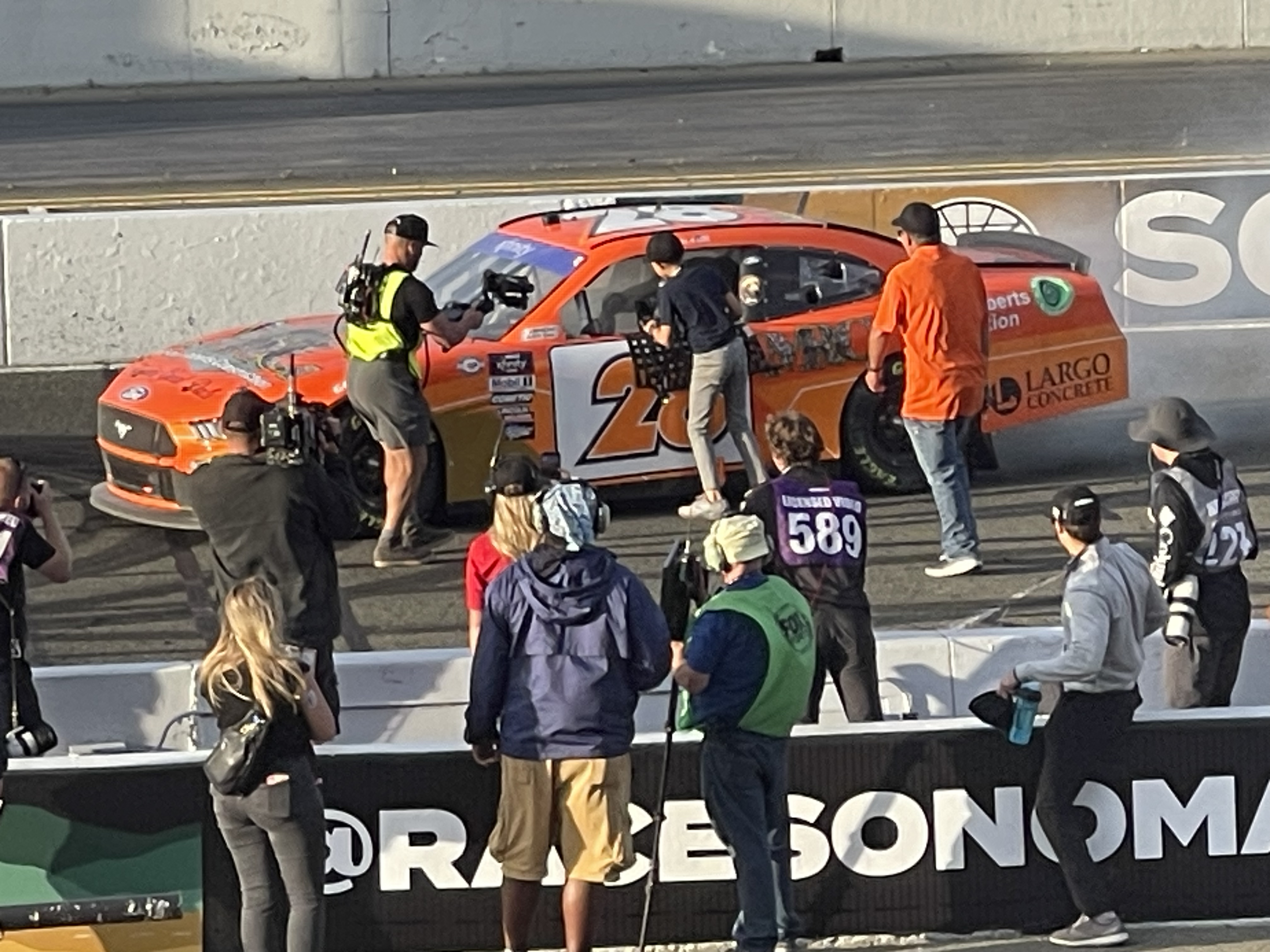
Aric Almirola celebrating his win in the 2023 race

The race was added to the 2023 Xfinity Series schedule, replacing the Truck Series' race at Sonoma in order to give the Xfinity Series another date on the west coast in June along with the race at Portland International Raceway in order for teams to save money on fuel costs for their haulers, which travel from the team's shops in the Charlotte metropolitan area. It was the first ever Xfinity Series race at Sonoma. It was one of eight (an all-time high) road course races on the 2023 series schedule. DoorDash, the title sponsor of the Truck Series race at Sonoma in 2022, became the title sponsor of the Xfinity Series race at Sonoma.

Stewart–Haas Racing Cup Series driver Aric Almirola won the inaugural race in a one-off attempt in the No. 28 car for RSS Racing. He earned the team's first ever win in the Xfinity Series. Kyle Larson won the pole and led the most laps but was passed by Almirola late in the race. Larson would lose a chance to compete for the win after clipping a tire barrier in the hairpin with 7 laps to go which caused him to lose steering as he was going through the turn.

The 2024 race originally did not have a title sponsor. The track's website used to list the name of the race as the Sonoma 250 and they have a logo for the race with that name. Later, it was announced that the app Zip would sponsor the race, and it became the Zip Buy Now, Pay Later 250.

On June 26, 2025, it was announced that Pit Boss and FoodMaxx would both sponsor the race, calling it the Pit Boss/FoodMaxx 250.

== Past winners ==
Year	Date	No.	Driver	Team	Manufacturer	Race Distance		Race Time	Average Speed (mph)	Report	Ref
Year	Date	No.	Driver	Team	Manufacturer	Laps	Miles (km)	Race Time	Average Speed (mph)	Report	Ref
2023	June 10	28	Aric Almirola	RSS Racing	Ford	79	157.21 (253)	2:03:29	76.388	Report	
2024	June 8	97	Shane van Gisbergen	Kaulig Racing	Chevrolet	79	157.21 (253)	2:11:02	71.986	Report	
2025	July 12	88	Connor Zilisch	JR Motorsports	Chevrolet	79	157.21 (253)	1:56:12	81.176	Report	
2026	June 27	9	Shane van Gisbergen	JR Motorsports	Chevrolet	79	157.21 (253)	2:03:37	76.305	Report	
2027	July 10									Report	

=== Multiple winners (teams) ===
# Wins	Team	Years won
2	JR Motorsports	2025, 2026

=== Manufacturer wins ===
# Wins	Make	Years won
3	(United States) Chevrolet	2024, 2025, 2026
1	(United States) Ford	2023

Previous race: Hy-Vee PERKS 250	NASCAR O'Reilly Auto Parts Series; Pit Boss/FoodMaxx 250	Next race: Pennzoil 250
