= 2025 Hard Rock Bet 300 =

6th race of the 2025 NASCAR Xfinity Series

Race details
- Race 6 of 33 of the 2025 NASCAR Xfinity Series
- Date: March 22, 2025
- Location: Homestead–Miami Speedway in Homestead, Florida
- Course: Permanent racing facility
- Course length: 1.5 miles (2.4 km)
- Distance: 201 laps, 301.5 mi (484 km)
- Scheduled distance: 200 laps, 300 mi (482 km)
- Average speed: 118.287 mph (190.364 km/h)

Pole position
Driver	Taylor Gray	Joe Gibbs Racing
- Time: 33.064

Most laps led
Driver	Kyle Larson	Hendrick Motorsports
- Laps: 132

Winner
No. 7	Justin Allgaier	JR Motorsports

Television in the United States
- Network: The CW
- Announcers: Adam Alexander, Jamie McMurray, and Parker Kligerman

Radio in the United States
- Radio: MRN

The 2025 Hard Rock Bet 300 was the 6th stock car race of the 2025 NASCAR Xfinity Series, and the 31st iteration of the event. The race was held on Saturday, March 22, 2025, at Homestead–Miami Speedway in Homestead, Florida, a 1.5 miles (2.4 km) permanent oval shaped racetrack. The race was originally scheduled to be contested over 200 laps but was increased by an extra lap due to an overtime finish.

Justin Allgaier, driving for JR Motorsports, would steal the victory on the final restart, passing Austin Hill on the final lap, earning his 27th career NASCAR Xfinity Series win, his second of the season, and his second consecutive win. Kyle Larson continued to show his dominance at Homestead, winning the second stage and leading a race-high 132 laps, before falling back on the final restart, finishing 4th, ending his chances at sweeping the tripleheader weekend. To fill out the podium, Sam Mayer, driving for Haas Factory Team, and Hill, driving for Richard Childress Racing, would finish 2nd and 3rd, respectively.

This was also the first race of the Dash 4 Cash. Drivers eligible for the D4C were Justin Allgaier, Jesse Love, Austin Hill, and Sam Mayer, since they were the highest finishing Xfinity regulars following the race at Las Vegas. Allgaier claimed the $100K bonus cash after winning the race.

== Report ==
=== Background ===
Homestead–Miami Speedway, the track where the race was held.

Homestead–Miami Speedway is a motor racing track located in Homestead, Florida. The track, which has several configurations, has promoted several series of racing, including NASCAR, the NTT IndyCar Series and the Grand-Am Rolex Sports Car Series.

From 2002 to 2019, Homestead–Miami Speedway has hosted the final race of the season in all three of NASCAR's series: the NASCAR Cup Series, Xfinity Series and Craftsman Truck Series. The track has since held races on different dates in 2020 (June) and 2021 (February), which were both affected by the COVID-19 pandemic, before being moved back into the Playoffs as the second race of the Round of 8 in 2022, with the date being kept for 2023.

==== Entry list ====
- (R) denotes rookie driver.
- (i) denotes driver who is ineligible for series driver points.

#	Driver	Team	Make
00	Sheldon Creed	Haas Factory Team	Ford
1	Carson Kvapil (R)	JR Motorsports	Chevrolet
2	Jesse Love	Richard Childress Racing	Chevrolet
4	Parker Retzlaff	Alpha Prime Racing	Chevrolet
5	Kris Wright	Our Motorsports	Chevrolet
07	Patrick Emerling	SS-Green Light Racing	Chevrolet
7	Justin Allgaier	JR Motorsports	Chevrolet
8	Sammy Smith	JR Motorsports	Chevrolet
10	Daniel Dye (R)	Kaulig Racing	Chevrolet
11	Josh Williams (Note: Due to a continued battle with pneumonia, Ty Dillon replaced Josh Williams in the No. 11 car for practice and qualifying. Williams was able to complete the full entirety of the race.)	Kaulig Racing	Chevrolet
14	Garrett Smithley	SS-Green Light Racing	Chevrolet
16	Christian Eckes (R)	Kaulig Racing	Chevrolet
17	Kyle Larson (i)	Hendrick Motorsports	Chevrolet
18	William Sawalich (R)	Joe Gibbs Racing	Toyota
19	Justin Bonsignore	Joe Gibbs Racing	Toyota
20	Brandon Jones	Joe Gibbs Racing	Toyota
21	Austin Hill	Richard Childress Racing	Chevrolet
24	Corey Heim (i)	Sam Hunt Racing	Toyota
25	Harrison Burton	AM Racing	Ford
26	Dean Thompson (R)	Sam Hunt Racing	Toyota
27	Jeb Burton	Jordan Anderson Racing	Chevrolet
28	Kyle Sieg	RSS Racing	Ford
31	Blaine Perkins	Jordan Anderson Racing	Chevrolet
35	Joey Gase	Joey Gase Motorsports	Chevrolet
39	Ryan Sieg	RSS Racing	Ford
41	Sam Mayer	Haas Factory Team	Ford
42	Anthony Alfredo	Young's Motorsports	Chevrolet
44	Brennan Poole	Alpha Prime Racing	Chevrolet
45	Brad Perez	Alpha Prime Racing	Chevrolet
48	Nick Sanchez (R)	Big Machine Racing	Chevrolet
51	Jeremy Clements	Jeremy Clements Racing	Chevrolet
53	Mason Maggio	Joey Gase Motorsports	Ford
54	Taylor Gray (R)	Joe Gibbs Racing	Toyota
70	Leland Honeyman	Cope Family Racing	Chevrolet
71	Ryan Ellis	DGM Racing	Chevrolet
74	Dawson Cram	Mike Harmon Racing	Chevrolet
88	Connor Zilisch (R)	JR Motorsports	Chevrolet
91	Myatt Snider	DGM Racing	Chevrolet
99	Matt DiBenedetto	Viking Motorsports	Chevrolet
Official entry list

== Practice ==
For practice, drivers were separated into two groups, A and B. Each session was 25 minutes long, and was held on Saturday, March 22, at 10:35 AM EST. Kyle Larson, driving for Hendrick Motorsports, set the fastest time from both sessions, with a lap of 33.137, and a speed of 162.960 mph (262.259 km/h).

Pos.	#	Driver	Team	Make	Time	Speed
1	17	Kyle Larson (i)	Hendrick Motorsports	Chevrolet	33.137	162.960
2	11	Ty Dillon (i)	Kaulig Racing	Chevrolet	33.184	162.729
3	39	Ryan Sieg	RSS Racing	Ford	33.318	162.075
Full practice results

== Qualifying ==
Qualifying was held on Saturday, March 22, at 11:40 AM EST. Since Homestead–Miami Speedway is an intermediate racetrack, the qualifying procedure used is a single-car, one-lap system with one round. Drivers will be on track by themselves and will have one lap to post a qualifying time, and whoever sets the fastest time will win the pole.

Taylor Gray, driving for Joe Gibbs Racing, would score the pole for the race, with a lap of 33.064, and a speed of 163.320 mph (262.838 km/h).

Dawson Cram was the only driver who failed to qualify.

=== Qualifying results ===
Pos.	#	Driver	Team	Make	Time	Speed
1	54	Taylor Gray (R)	Joe Gibbs Racing	Toyota	33.064	163.320
2	88	Connor Zilisch (R)	JR Motorsports	Chevrolet	33.143	162.930
3	48	Nick Sanchez (R)	Big Machine Racing	Chevrolet	33.173	162.783
4	7	Justin Allgaier	JR Motorsports	Chevrolet	33.223	162.538
5	16	Christian Eckes (R)	Kaulig Racing	Chevrolet	33.234	162.484
6	41	Sam Mayer	Haas Factory Team	Ford	33.237	162.470
7	19	Justin Bonsignore	Joe Gibbs Racing	Toyota	33.258	162.367
8	39	Ryan Sieg	RSS Racing	Ford	33.260	162.357
9	00	Sheldon Creed	Haas Factory Team	Ford	33.347	161.934
10	99	Matt DiBenedetto	Viking Motorsports	Chevrolet	33.390	161.725
11	11	Ty Dillon (i)	Kaulig Racing	Chevrolet	33.443	161.469
12	25	Harrison Burton	AM Racing	Ford	33.455	161.411
13	18	William Sawalich (R)	Joe Gibbs Racing	Toyota	33.458	161.396
14	1	Carson Kvapil (R)	JR Motorsports	Chevrolet	33.459	161.392
15	8	Sammy Smith	JR Motorsports	Chevrolet	33.487	161.257
16	31	Blaine Perkins	Jordan Anderson Racing	Chevrolet	33.575	160.834
17	17	Kyle Larson (i)	Hendrick Motorsports	Chevrolet	33.583	160.796
18	4	Parker Retzlaff	Alpha Prime Racing	Chevrolet	33.591	160.757
19	44	Brennan Poole	Alpha Prime Racing	Chevrolet	33.609	160.671
20	2	Jesse Love	Richard Childress Racing	Chevrolet	33.636	160.542
21	21	Austin Hill	Richard Childress Racing	Chevrolet	33.637	160.538
22	51	Jeremy Clements	Jeremy Clements Racing	Chevrolet	33.643	160.509
23	27	Jeb Burton	Jordan Anderson Racing	Chevrolet	33.648	160.485
24	26	Dean Thompson (R)	Sam Hunt Racing	Toyota	33.668	160.390
25	42	Anthony Alfredo	Young's Motorsports	Chevrolet	33.739	160.052
26	45	Brad Perez	Alpha Prime Racing	Chevrolet	33.957	159.025
27	28	Kyle Sieg	RSS Racing	Ford	34.023	158.716
28	71	Ryan Ellis	DGM Racing	Chevrolet	34.039	158.642
29	91	Myatt Snider	DGM Racing	Chevrolet	34.067	158.511
30	10	Daniel Dye (R)	Kaulig Racing	Chevrolet	34.122	158.256
31	24	Corey Heim (i)	Sam Hunt Racing	Toyota	34.123	158.251
32	07	Patrick Emerling	SS-Green Light Racing	Chevrolet	34.180	157.987
Qualified by owner's points
33	70	Leland Honeyman	Cope Family Racing	Chevrolet	34.265	157.595
34	53	Mason Maggio	Joey Gase Motorsports	Ford	34.353	157.192
35	35	Joey Gase	Joey Gase Motorsports	Chevrolet	34.715	155.552
36	5	Kris Wright	Our Motorsports	Chevrolet	34.898	154.737
37	14	Garrett Smithley	SS-Green Light Racing	Chevrolet	34.965	154.440
38	20	Brandon Jones	Joe Gibbs Racing	Toyota	–	–
Failed to qualify
39	74	Dawson Cram	Mike Harmon Racing	Chevrolet	34.290	157.480
Official qualifying results
Official starting lineup

== Race results ==
Stage 1 Laps: 40

Pos.	#	Driver	Team	Make	Pts
1	8	Sammy Smith	JR Motorsports	Chevrolet	10
2	28	Kyle Sieg	RSS Racing	Ford	9
3	39	Ryan Sieg	RSS Racing	Ford	8
4	17	Kyle Larson (i)	Hendrick Motorsports	Chevrolet	0
5	41	Sam Mayer	Haas Factory Team	Ford	6
6	7	Justin Allgaier	JR Motorsports	Chevrolet	5
7	70	Leland Honeyman	Cope Family Racing	Chevrolet	4
8	00	Sheldon Creed	Haas Factory Team	Ford	3
9	2	Jesse Love	Richard Childress Racing	Chevrolet	2
10	21	Austin Hill	Richard Childress Racing	Chevrolet	1

Stage 2 Laps: 40

Pos.	#	Driver	Team	Make	Pts
1	17	Kyle Larson (i)	Hendrick Motorsports	Chevrolet	0
2	41	Sam Mayer	Haas Factory Team	Ford	9
3	00	Sheldon Creed	Haas Factory Team	Ford	8
4	21	Austin Hill	Richard Childress Racing	Chevrolet	7
5	88	Connor Zilisch (R)	JR Motorsports	Chevrolet	6
6	48	Nick Sanchez (R)	Big Machine Racing	Chevrolet	5
7	2	Jesse Love	Richard Childress Racing	Chevrolet	4
8	7	Justin Allgaier	JR Motorsports	Chevrolet	3
9	8	Sammy Smith	JR Motorsports	Chevrolet	2
10	20	Brandon Jones	Joe Gibbs Racing	Toyota	1

Stage 3 Laps: 121

Fin	St	#	Driver	Team	Make	Laps	Led	Status	Pts
1	4	7	Justin Allgaier	JR Motorsports	Chevrolet	201	21	Running	49
2	6	41	Sam Mayer	Haas Factory Team	Ford	201	22	Running	50
3	21	21	Austin Hill	Richard Childress Racing	Chevrolet	201	2	Running	42
4	17	17	Kyle Larson (i)	Hendrick Motorsports	Chevrolet	201	132	Running	0
5	9	00	Sheldon Creed	Haas Factory Team	Ford	201	0	Running	43
6	20	2	Jesse Love	Richard Childress Racing	Chevrolet	201	4	Running	37
7	38	20	Brandon Jones	Joe Gibbs Racing	Toyota	201	0	Running	31
8	3	48	Nick Sanchez (R)	Big Machine Racing	Chevrolet	201	0	Running	34
9	30	10	Daniel Dye (R)	Kaulig Racing	Chevrolet	201	0	Running	28
10	14	1	Carson Kvapil (R)	JR Motorsports	Chevrolet	201	1	Running	27
11	12	25	Harrison Burton	AM Racing	Ford	201	6	Running	26
12	2	88	Connor Zilisch (R)	JR Motorsports	Chevrolet	200	2	Running	31
13	24	26	Dean Thompson (R)	Sam Hunt Racing	Toyota	200	0	Running	24
14	19	44	Brennan Poole	Alpha Prime Racing	Chevrolet	200	0	Running	23
15	23	27	Jeb Burton	Jordan Anderson Racing	Chevrolet	200	0	Running	22
16	7	19	Justin Bonsignore	Joe Gibbs Racing	Toyota	200	0	Running	21
17	18	4	Parker Retzlaff	Alpha Prime Racing	Chevrolet	200	0	Running	20
18	25	42	Anthony Alfredo	Young's Motorsports	Chevrolet	200	0	Running	19
19	11	11	Josh Williams	Kaulig Racing	Chevrolet	200	0	Running	18
20	28	71	Ryan Ellis	DGM Racing	Chevrolet	200	0	Running	17
21	15	8	Sammy Smith	JR Motorsports	Chevrolet	199	3	Running	28
22	8	39	Ryan Sieg	RSS Racing	Ford	199	0	Running	23
23	1	54	Taylor Gray (R)	Joe Gibbs Racing	Toyota	199	7	Running	14
24	13	18	William Sawalich (R)	Joe Gibbs Racing	Toyota	199	0	Running	13
25	16	31	Blaine Perkins	Jordan Anderson Racing	Chevrolet	199	0	Running	12
26	22	51	Jeremy Clements	Jeremy Clements Racing	Chevrolet	199	0	Running	11
27	27	28	Kyle Sieg	RSS Racing	Ford	198	1	Running	19
28	26	45	Brad Perez	Alpha Prime Racing	Chevrolet	198	0	Running	9
29	35	35	Joey Gase	Joey Gase Motorsports	Chevrolet	198	0	Running	8
30	29	91	Myatt Snider	DGM Racing	Chevrolet	198	0	Running	7
31	37	14	Garrett Smithley	SS-Green Light Racing	Chevrolet	197	0	Running	6
32	36	5	Kris Wright	Our Motorsports	Chevrolet	197	0	Running	5
33	32	07	Patrick Emerling	SS-Green Light Racing	Chevrolet	197	0	Running	4
34	33	70	Leland Honeyman	Cope Family Racing	Chevrolet	196	0	Running	7
35	34	53	Mason Maggio	Joey Gase Motorsports	Ford	196	0	Running	2
36	10	99	Matt DiBenedetto	Viking Motorsports	Chevrolet	179	0	Electrical	1
37	31	24	Corey Heim (i)	Sam Hunt Racing	Toyota	57	0	Electrical	0
38	5	16	Christian Eckes (R)	Kaulig Racing	Chevrolet	16	0	Engine	1
Official race results

== Standings after the race ==
Drivers' Championship standings

	Pos	Driver	Points
	1	Justin Allgaier	249
1	2	Sam Mayer	220 (–29)
1	3	Jesse Love	218 (–31)
	4	Austin Hill	202 (–47)
2	5	Sheldon Creed	187 (–62)
1	6	Sammy Smith	184 (–65)
2	7	Connor Zilisch	164 (–85)
2	8	Ryan Sieg	156 (–93)
3	9	Aric Almirola	151 (–98)
2	10	Taylor Gray	151 (–98)
2	11	Harrison Burton	145 (–104)
	12	Jeb Burton	143 (–106)
Official driver's standings

Manufacturers' Championship standings

Pos	Manufacturer	Points
1	Chevrolet	235
2	Toyota	201 (–34)
3	Ford	196 (–39)

- Note: Only the first 12 positions are included for the driver standings.

Previous race: 2025 The LiUNA!	NASCAR Xfinity Series; 2025 season	Next race: 2025 US Marine Corps 250
