= 2025 NASCAR Xfinity Series =

American motorsport season

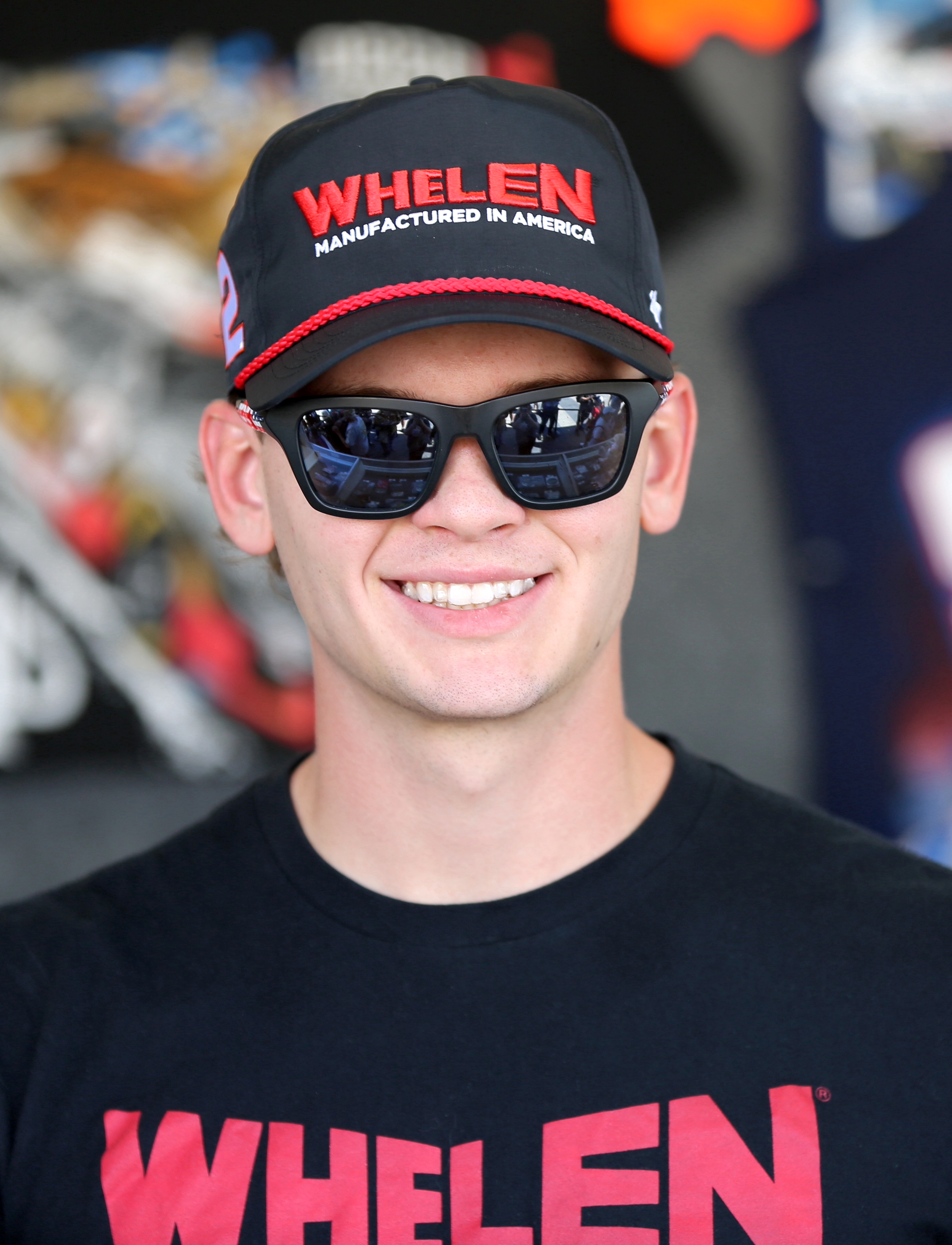
Jesse Love, the 2025 Xfinity Series champion.

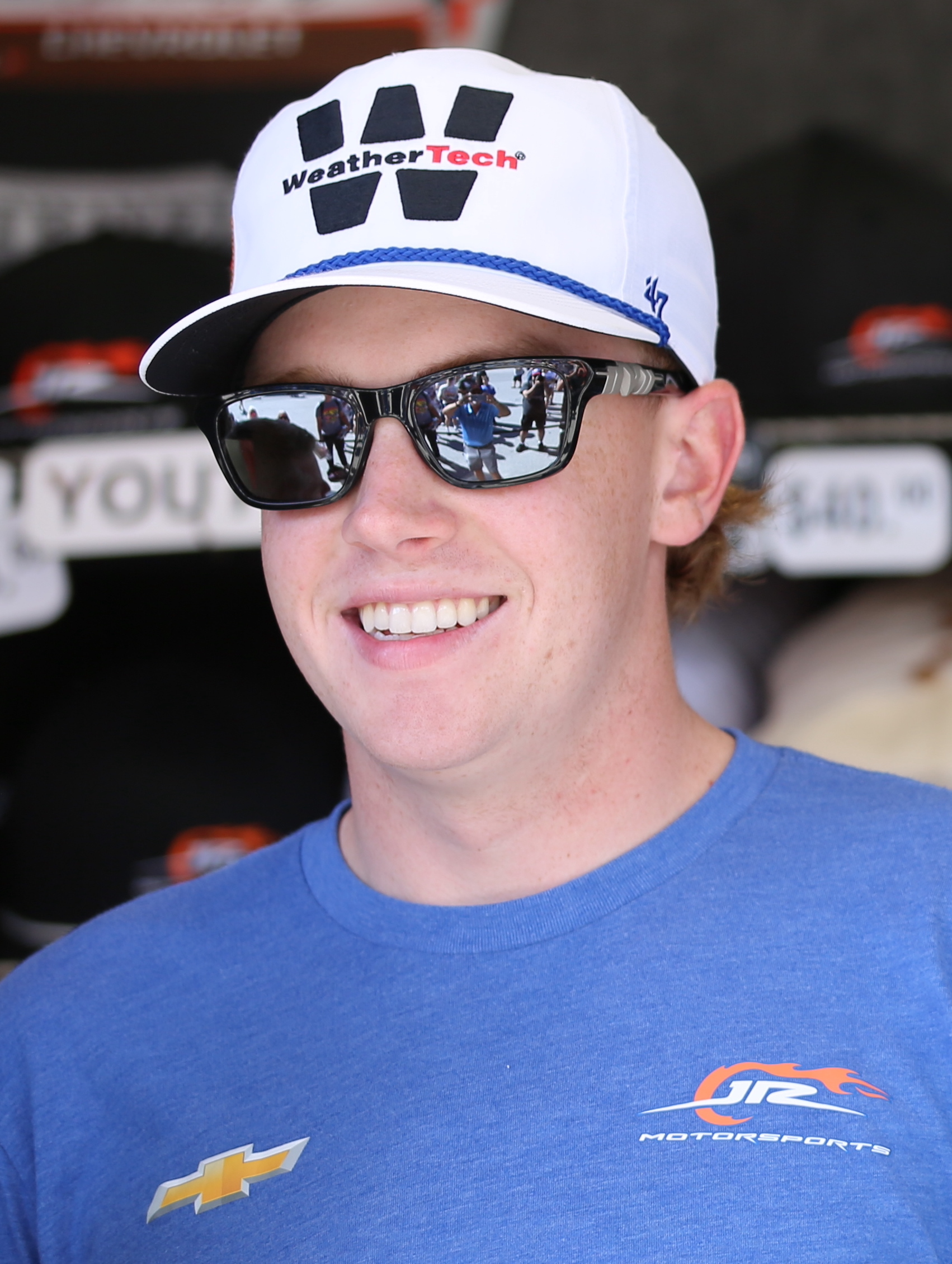
Connor Zilisch, the regular season champion and the Rookie of the Year, finished second in the standings.

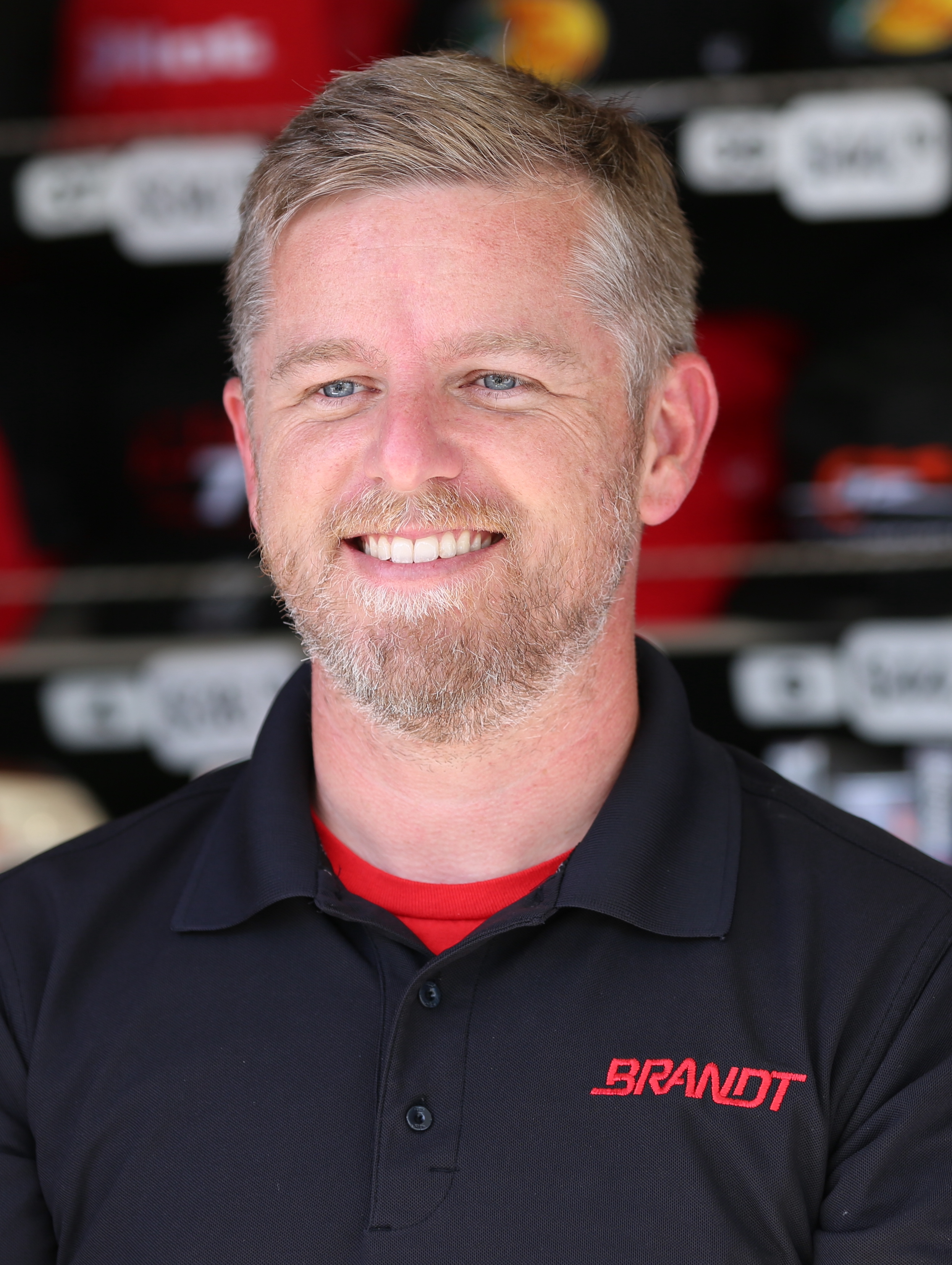
Justin Allgaier, the defending Xfinity series champion, finished third in the standings.

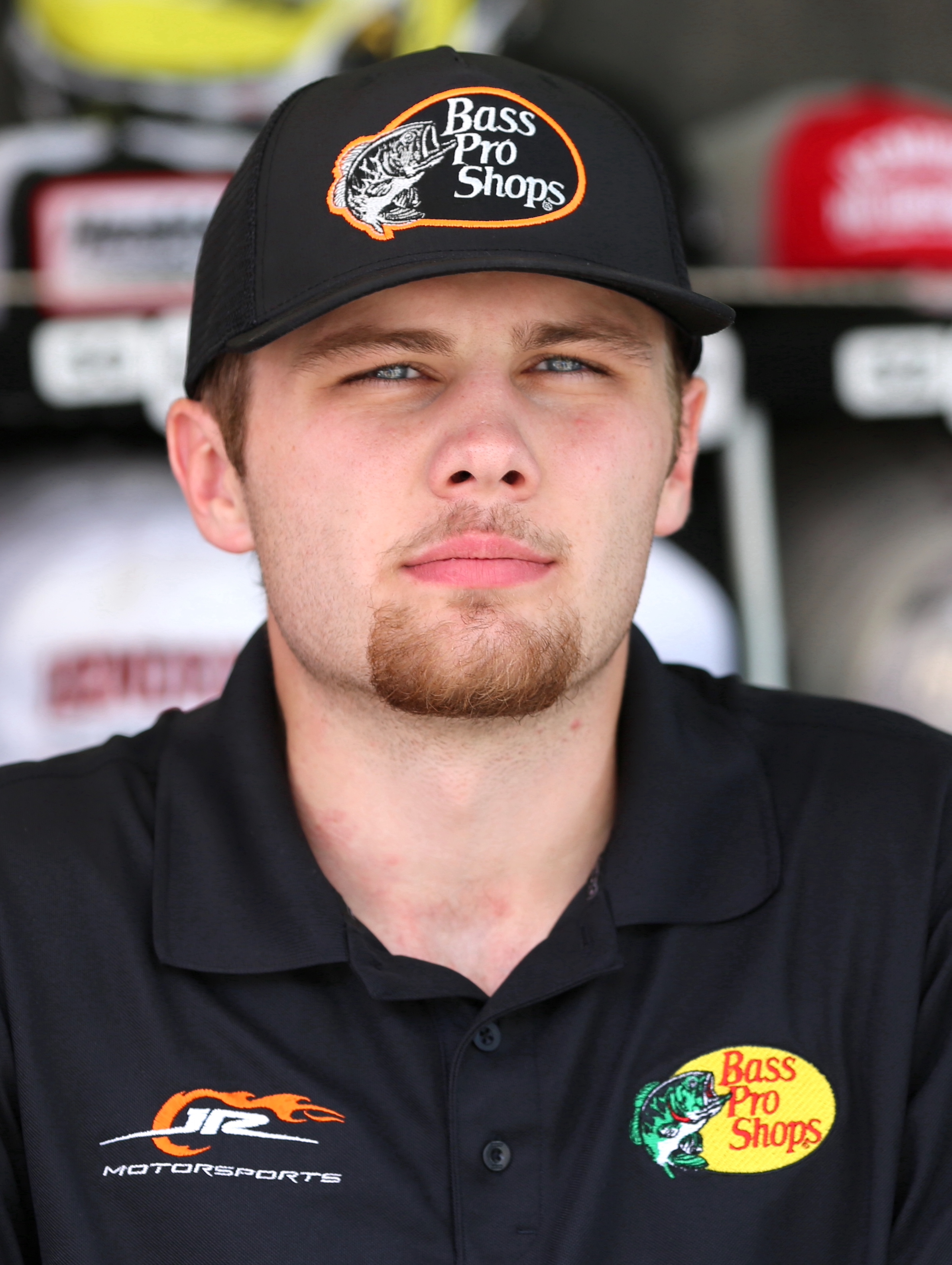
Carson Kvapil finished fourth in the standings.

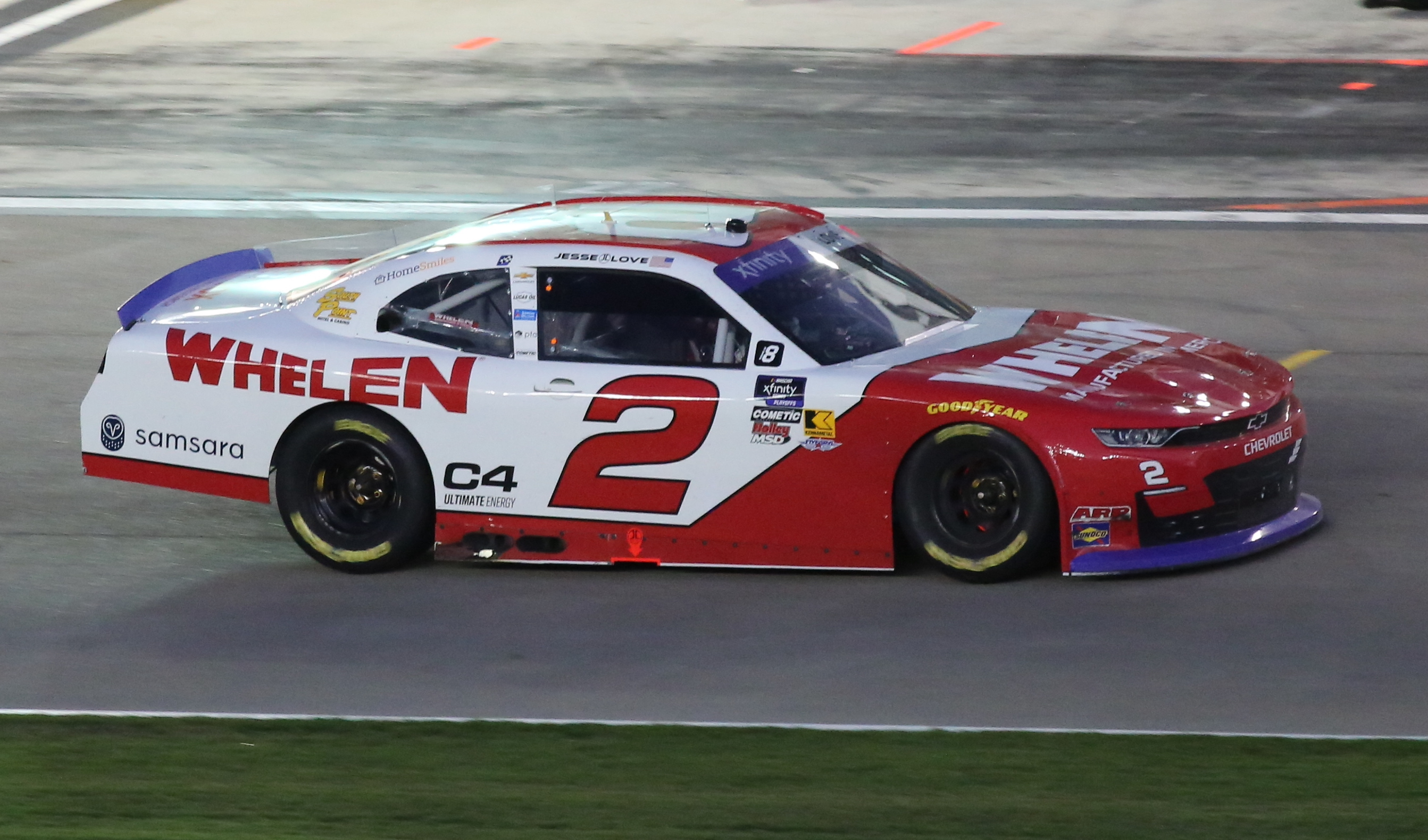
Chevrolet won the manufacturers' championship.

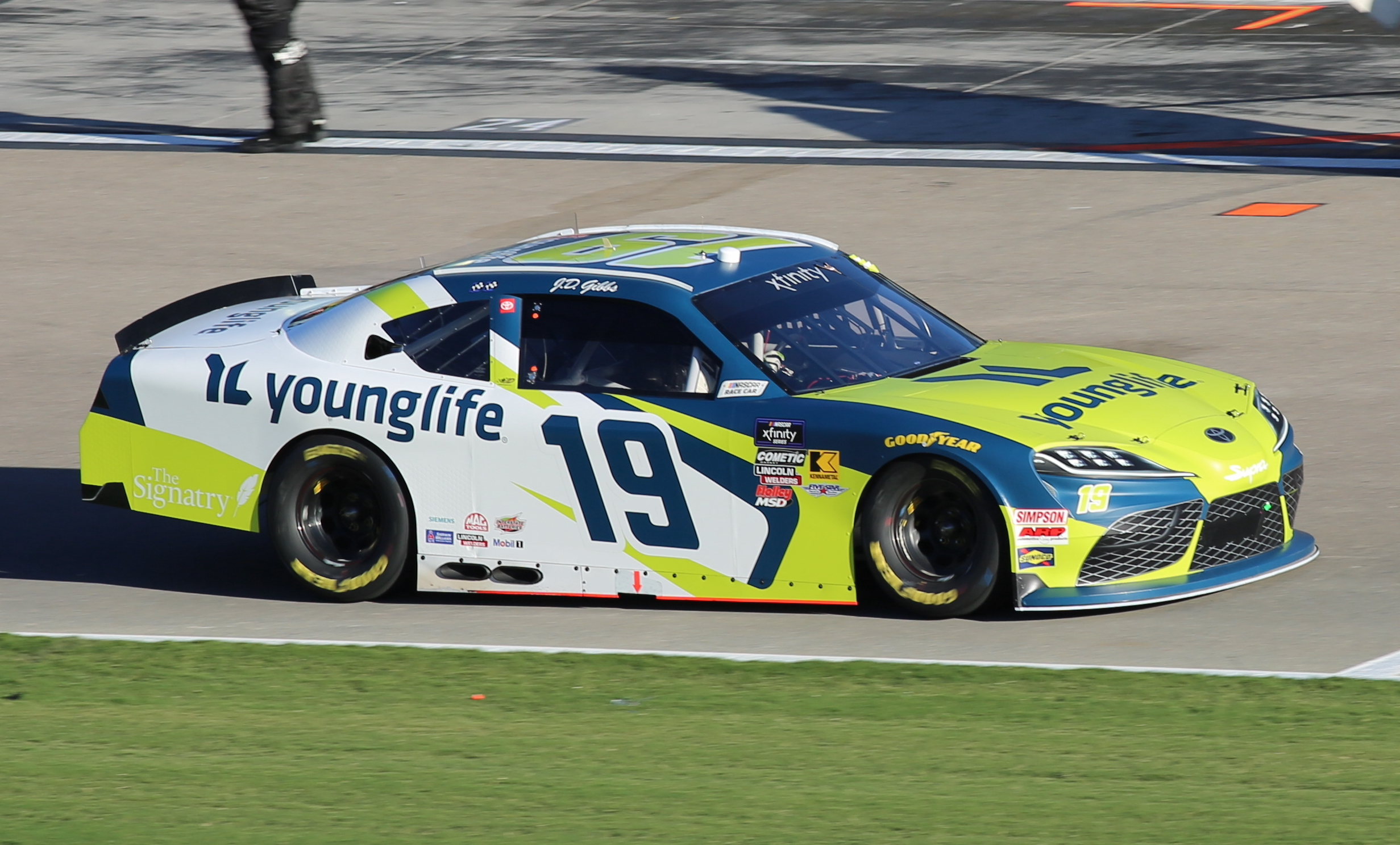
The no. 19 car of Joe Gibbs Racing won the owners' championship

The 2025 NASCAR Xfinity Series was the 44th season of the NASCAR Xfinity Series, a stock car racing series sanctioned by NASCAR in the United States. The season started on February 15 with the United Rentals 300 at Daytona International Speedway and ended with the NASCAR Xfinity Series Championship Race on November 1 at Phoenix Raceway.

The 2025 season was the second season, and the first as the exclusive broadcaster, in which The CW will be televising the NASCAR Xfinity Series under NASCAR's new TV deal that will take place until 2031. This season marked the final season with Xfinity as the title sponsor of the series, as O'Reilly Auto Parts replaced the title sponsor starting next season.

Justin Allgaier of JR Motorsports entered the season as the defending series champion. Rookie Connor Zilisch won the regular season championship. At season's end, Jesse Love of Richard Childress Racing won the championship.

== Teams and drivers ==
=== Full-time teams ===
| Manufacturer | Team | No. | Driver | Crew chief | References |
|---|---|---|---|---|---|
| Chevrolet | Alpha Prime Racing | 4 | Parker Retzlaff | Joe Williams Jr. | |
| Chevrolet | Alpha Prime Racing | 44 | Brennan Poole | Frank Kerr | |
| Chevrolet | Alpha Prime Racing | 45 | Caesar Bacarella 2 | Mike Tyska 6 Keith Wolfe 6 Wayne Carroll Jr. 21 | |
| Chevrolet | Alpha Prime Racing | 45 | Mason Massey 13 | Mike Tyska 6 Keith Wolfe 6 Wayne Carroll Jr. 21 | |
| Chevrolet | Alpha Prime Racing | 45 | Brad Perez 7 | Mike Tyska 6 Keith Wolfe 6 Wayne Carroll Jr. 21 | |
| Chevrolet | Alpha Prime Racing | 45 | Vicente Salas 2 | Mike Tyska 6 Keith Wolfe 6 Wayne Carroll Jr. 21 | |
| Chevrolet | Alpha Prime Racing | 45 | Lavar Scott 2 | Mike Tyska 6 Keith Wolfe 6 Wayne Carroll Jr. 21 | |
| Chevrolet | Alpha Prime Racing | 45 | Stefan Parsons 1 | Mike Tyska 6 Keith Wolfe 6 Wayne Carroll Jr. 21 | |
| Chevrolet | Alpha Prime Racing | 45 | Josh Williams 6 | Mike Tyska 6 Keith Wolfe 6 Wayne Carroll Jr. 21 | |
| Chevrolet | Big Machine Racing | 48 | Nick Sanchez (R) | Patrick Donahue | |
| Chevrolet | Cope Family Racing | 70 | Leland Honeyman 17 | George Church 2 Aeden McHugh 31 | |
| Chevrolet | Cope Family Racing | 70 | Thomas Annunziata 15 | George Church 2 Aeden McHugh 31 | |
| Chevrolet | Cope Family Racing | 70 | Will Rodgers 1 | George Church 2 Aeden McHugh 31 | |
| Chevrolet | DGM Racing with Jesse Iwuji Motorsports | 71 | Ryan Ellis | Mario Gosselin | |
| Chevrolet | DGM Racing with Jesse Iwuji Motorsports | 91 | Josh Bilicki 19 | Bryan Berry 29; Steve Addington 4 | |
| Chevrolet | DGM Racing with Jesse Iwuji Motorsports | 91 | Myatt Snider 4 | Bryan Berry 29; Steve Addington 4 | |
| Chevrolet | DGM Racing with Jesse Iwuji Motorsports | 91 | C. J. McLaughlin 3 | Bryan Berry 29; Steve Addington 4 | |
| Chevrolet | DGM Racing with Jesse Iwuji Motorsports | 91 | Jesse Iwuji 1 | Bryan Berry 29; Steve Addington 4 | |
| Chevrolet | DGM Racing with Jesse Iwuji Motorsports | 91 | Andrés Pérez de Lara 1 | Bryan Berry 29; Steve Addington 4 | |
| Chevrolet | DGM Racing with Jesse Iwuji Motorsports | 91 | Josh Williams 3 | Bryan Berry 29; Steve Addington 4 | |
| Chevrolet | DGM Racing with Jesse Iwuji Motorsports | 91 | Matt Mills 1 | Bryan Berry 29; Steve Addington 4 | |
| Chevrolet | DGM Racing with Jesse Iwuji Motorsports | 91 | Mason Maggio 1 | Bryan Berry 29; Steve Addington 4 | |
| Chevrolet | Jeremy Clements Racing | 51 | Jeremy Clements | Kase Kallenbach | |
| Chevrolet | Jordan Anderson Racing | 27 | Jeb Burton | Mark Setzer | |
| Chevrolet | Jordan Anderson Racing | 31 | Blaine Perkins | Jeff Kirkendall 3 Cody McKenzie 30 | |
| Chevrolet | JR Motorsports | 1 | Carson Kvapil (R) | Andrew Overstreet | |
| Chevrolet | JR Motorsports | 7 | Justin Allgaier | Jim Pohlman | |
| Chevrolet | JR Motorsports | 8 | Sammy Smith | Phillip Bell | |
| Chevrolet | JR Motorsports | 88 | Connor Zilisch (R) 32 | Mardy Lindley 32; Dale Earnhardt Jr. 1 | |
| Chevrolet | JR Motorsports | 88 | Kyle Larson 1 | Mardy Lindley 32; Dale Earnhardt Jr. 1 | |
| Chevrolet | Kaulig Racing | 10 | Daniel Dye (R) | Kevin Walter 32; Lennie Chandler 1 | |
| Chevrolet | Kaulig Racing | 11 | Josh Williams 21 | Eddie Pardue | (Note: Ty Dillon relieved Williams in the No. 11 car during the race at Las Vegas in March (race #5) due to Williams being sick on the day of the race.) |
| Chevrolet | Kaulig Racing | 11 | Carson Hocevar 1 | Eddie Pardue | (Note: Ty Dillon relieved Williams in the No. 11 car during the race at Las Vegas in March (race #5) due to Williams being sick on the day of the race.) |
| Chevrolet | Kaulig Racing | 11 | Michael McDowell 1 | Eddie Pardue | (Note: Ty Dillon relieved Williams in the No. 11 car during the race at Las Vegas in March (race #5) due to Williams being sick on the day of the race.) |
| Chevrolet | Kaulig Racing | 11 | Justin Haley 1 | Eddie Pardue | (Note: Ty Dillon relieved Williams in the No. 11 car during the race at Las Vegas in March (race #5) due to Williams being sick on the day of the race.) |
| Chevrolet | Kaulig Racing | 11 | Will Brown 1 | Eddie Pardue | (Note: Ty Dillon relieved Williams in the No. 11 car during the race at Las Vegas in March (race #5) due to Williams being sick on the day of the race.) |
| Chevrolet | Kaulig Racing | 11 | Daniel Hemric 3 | Eddie Pardue | (Note: Ty Dillon relieved Williams in the No. 11 car during the race at Las Vegas in March (race #5) due to Williams being sick on the day of the race.) |
| Chevrolet | Kaulig Racing | 11 | Brenden Queen 5 | Eddie Pardue | (Note: Ty Dillon relieved Williams in the No. 11 car during the race at Las Vegas in March (race #5) due to Williams being sick on the day of the race.) |
| Chevrolet | Kaulig Racing | 16 | Christian Eckes (R) | Alex Yontz | |
| Chevrolet | Richard Childress Racing | 2 | Jesse Love | Danny Stockman Jr. | |
| Chevrolet | Richard Childress Racing | 21 | Austin Hill 32 | Chad Haney | (Note: The Austin Hill who drives for Richard Childress Racing and the Austin Hill who drives for Joey Gase Motorsports are different people.) |
| Chevrolet | Richard Childress Racing | 21 | Austin Dillon 1 | Chad Haney | (Note: The Austin Hill who drives for Richard Childress Racing and the Austin Hill who drives for Joey Gase Motorsports are different people.) |
| Chevrolet | SS-Green Light Racing | 07 | Patrick Emerling 9 | Paul Clapprood | |
| Chevrolet | SS-Green Light Racing | 07 | Nick Leitz 12 | Paul Clapprood | |
| Chevrolet | SS-Green Light Racing | 07 | Alex Labbé 7 | Paul Clapprood | |
| Chevrolet | SS-Green Light Racing | 07 | Carson Ware 2 | Paul Clapprood | |
| Chevrolet | SS-Green Light Racing | 07 | Logan Bearden 1 | Paul Clapprood | |
| Chevrolet | SS-Green Light Racing | 07 | Preston Pardus 1 | Paul Clapprood | |
| Chevrolet | SS-Green Light Racing | 07 | Brad Perez 1 | Paul Clapprood | |
| Chevrolet | SS-Green Light Racing with BRK Racing | 14 | Garrett Smithley 27 | Jason Miller 15; Robbie Freeman 2 Doug Richert 16 | |
| Chevrolet | SS-Green Light Racing with BRK Racing | 14 | Carson Hocevar 1 | Jason Miller 15; Robbie Freeman 2 Doug Richert 16 | |
| Chevrolet | SS-Green Light Racing with BRK Racing | 14 | Logan Bearden 2 | Jason Miller 15; Robbie Freeman 2 Doug Richert 16 | |
| Chevrolet | SS-Green Light Racing with BRK Racing | 14 | Josh Bilicki 1 | Jason Miller 15; Robbie Freeman 2 Doug Richert 16 | |
| Chevrolet | SS-Green Light Racing with BRK Racing | 14 | Connor Mosack 2 | Jason Miller 15; Robbie Freeman 2 Doug Richert 16 | |
| Chevrolet | Viking Motorsports | 99 | Matt DiBenedetto 30 | Pat Tryson | |
| Chevrolet | Viking Motorsports | 99 | Connor Mosack 3 | Pat Tryson | |
| Chevrolet | Young's Motorsports | 42 | Anthony Alfredo | Andrew Abbott | |
| Ford | AM Racing | 25 | Harrison Burton | Danny Efland | |
| Ford | Haas Factory Team | 00 | Sheldon Creed | Jonathan Toney | |
| Ford | Haas Factory Team | 41 | Sam Mayer 32 | Jason Trinchere | |
| Ford | Haas Factory Team | 41 | Ryan Sieg 1 | Jason Trinchere | |
| Ford | RSS Racing | 28 | Kyle Sieg 31 | Wayne Carroll Jr. 12; Eli Griffeth 1 R. B. Bracken 1 Brad Parrott 19 | |
| Ford | RSS Racing | 28 | Joey Hand 1 | Wayne Carroll Jr. 12; Eli Griffeth 1 R. B. Bracken 1 Brad Parrott 19 | |
| Ford | RSS Racing | 28 | Nick Leitz 1 | Wayne Carroll Jr. 12; Eli Griffeth 1 R. B. Bracken 1 Brad Parrott 19 | |
| Ford | RSS Racing | 39 | Ryan Sieg 32 | Matt Noyce | |
| Ford | RSS Racing | 39 | Kyle Sieg 1 | Matt Noyce | |
| Toyota | Joe Gibbs Racing | 18 | William Sawalich (R) 31 | Jeff Meendering | |
| Toyota | Joe Gibbs Racing | 18 | Justin Bonsignore 2 | Jeff Meendering | |
| Toyota | Joe Gibbs Racing | 19 | Justin Bonsignore 7 | Seth Chavka | |
| Toyota | Joe Gibbs Racing | 19 | Aric Almirola 17 | Seth Chavka | |
| Toyota | Joe Gibbs Racing | 19 | Riley Herbst 4 | Seth Chavka | |
| Toyota | Joe Gibbs Racing | 19 | Christopher Bell 1 | Seth Chavka | |
| Toyota | Joe Gibbs Racing | 19 | Chase Briscoe 1 | Seth Chavka | |
| Toyota | Joe Gibbs Racing | 19 | Jack Perkins 2 | Seth Chavka | |
| Toyota | Joe Gibbs Racing | 19 | Ty Gibbs 1 | Seth Chavka | |
| Toyota | Joe Gibbs Racing | 20 | Brandon Jones | Sam McAulay | |
| Toyota | Joe Gibbs Racing | 54 | Taylor Gray (R) | Jason Ratcliff | |
| Toyota | Sam Hunt Racing | 26 | Dean Thompson (R) | Kris Bowen | |
| Chevrolet 23 Ford 5 Toyota 5 | Joey Gase Motorsports with Scott Osteen | 35 | Greg Van Alst 8 | Scott Eggleston 13; Mike Hillman Sr. 14; Mike Tyska 2 Jim Gase 2 Keith Wolfe 1 | |
| Chevrolet 23 Ford 5 Toyota 5 | Joey Gase Motorsports with Scott Osteen | 35 | Joey Gase 4 | Scott Eggleston 13; Mike Hillman Sr. 14; Mike Tyska 2 Jim Gase 2 Keith Wolfe 1 | |
| Chevrolet 23 Ford 5 Toyota 5 | Joey Gase Motorsports with Scott Osteen | 35 | Baltazar Leguizamón 1 | Scott Eggleston 13; Mike Hillman Sr. 14; Mike Tyska 2 Jim Gase 2 Keith Wolfe 1 | |
| Chevrolet 23 Ford 5 Toyota 5 | Joey Gase Motorsports with Scott Osteen | 35 | Carson Ware 2 | Scott Eggleston 13; Mike Hillman Sr. 14; Mike Tyska 2 Jim Gase 2 Keith Wolfe 1 | |
| Chevrolet 23 Ford 5 Toyota 5 | Joey Gase Motorsports with Scott Osteen | 35 | Glen Reen 5 | Scott Eggleston 13; Mike Hillman Sr. 14; Mike Tyska 2 Jim Gase 2 Keith Wolfe 1 | |
| Chevrolet 23 Ford 5 Toyota 5 | Joey Gase Motorsports with Scott Osteen | 35 | Rubén Rovelo 1 | Scott Eggleston 13; Mike Hillman Sr. 14; Mike Tyska 2 Jim Gase 2 Keith Wolfe 1 | |
| Chevrolet 23 Ford 5 Toyota 5 | Joey Gase Motorsports with Scott Osteen | 35 | Andre Castro 1 | Scott Eggleston 13; Mike Hillman Sr. 14; Mike Tyska 2 Jim Gase 2 Keith Wolfe 1 | |
| Chevrolet 23 Ford 5 Toyota 5 | Joey Gase Motorsports with Scott Osteen | 35 | Austin J. Hill 2 | Scott Eggleston 13; Mike Hillman Sr. 14; Mike Tyska 2 Jim Gase 2 Keith Wolfe 1 | |
| Chevrolet 23 Ford 5 Toyota 5 | Joey Gase Motorsports with Scott Osteen | 35 | David Starr 2 | Scott Eggleston 13; Mike Hillman Sr. 14; Mike Tyska 2 Jim Gase 2 Keith Wolfe 1 | |
| Chevrolet 23 Ford 5 Toyota 5 | Joey Gase Motorsports with Scott Osteen | 35 | Tyler Tomassi 1 (Note: Entry was fielded in a collaboration with MBM Motorsports.) | Scott Eggleston 13; Mike Hillman Sr. 14; Mike Tyska 2 Jim Gase 2 Keith Wolfe 1 | |
| Chevrolet 23 Ford 5 Toyota 5 | Joey Gase Motorsports with Scott Osteen | 35 | Mason Maggio 2 | Scott Eggleston 13; Mike Hillman Sr. 14; Mike Tyska 2 Jim Gase 2 Keith Wolfe 1 | |
| Chevrolet 23 Ford 5 Toyota 5 | Joey Gase Motorsports with Scott Osteen | 35 | Takuma Koga 2 | Scott Eggleston 13; Mike Hillman Sr. 14; Mike Tyska 2 Jim Gase 2 Keith Wolfe 1 | |
| Chevrolet 23 Ford 5 Toyota 5 | Joey Gase Motorsports with Scott Osteen | 35 | Stefan Parsons 2 (Note: Entry was fielded in a collaboration with Alpha Prime Racing.) | Scott Eggleston 13; Mike Hillman Sr. 14; Mike Tyska 2 Jim Gase 2 Keith Wolfe 1 | |
| Chevrolet 21 Ford 7 Toyota 5 | Joey Gase Motorsports with Scott Osteen | 53 | Joey Gase 13 | Mike Hillman Sr. 18; Scott Eggleston 15 | |
| Chevrolet 21 Ford 7 Toyota 5 | Joey Gase Motorsports with Scott Osteen | 53 | Mason Maggio 8 | Mike Hillman Sr. 18; Scott Eggleston 15 | |
| Chevrolet 21 Ford 7 Toyota 5 | Joey Gase Motorsports with Scott Osteen | 53 | Sage Karam 5 | Mike Hillman Sr. 18; Scott Eggleston 15 | |
| Chevrolet 21 Ford 7 Toyota 5 | Joey Gase Motorsports with Scott Osteen | 53 | David Starr 2 | Mike Hillman Sr. 18; Scott Eggleston 15 | |
| Chevrolet 21 Ford 7 Toyota 5 | Joey Gase Motorsports with Scott Osteen | 53 | J. J. Yeley 2 (Note: At Rockingham (race #10), J. J. Yeley qualified the No. 53, but after Legge failed to qualify for the race in her own No. 32 car, she replaced J. J. Yeley in the No. 53.) | Mike Hillman Sr. 18; Scott Eggleston 15 | |
| Chevrolet 21 Ford 7 Toyota 5 | Joey Gase Motorsports with Scott Osteen | 53 | Katherine Legge 1 | Mike Hillman Sr. 18; Scott Eggleston 15 | |
| Chevrolet 21 Ford 7 Toyota 5 | Joey Gase Motorsports with Scott Osteen | 53 | Logan Bearden 1 | Mike Hillman Sr. 18; Scott Eggleston 15 | |
| Chevrolet 21 Ford 7 Toyota 5 | Joey Gase Motorsports with Scott Osteen | 53 | Austin J. Hill 1 | Mike Hillman Sr. 18; Scott Eggleston 15 | |
| Chevrolet 21 Ford 7 Toyota 5 | Joey Gase Motorsports with Scott Osteen | 53 | Kyle Sieg 1 | Mike Hillman Sr. 18; Scott Eggleston 15 | |

=== Part-time teams ===
| Manufacturer | Team | No. | Driver | Crew chief | Races | References |
|---|---|---|---|---|---|---|
| Chevrolet | DGM Racing with Jesse Iwuji Motorsports | 92 | C. J. McLaughlin | Steve Addington | 3 | |
| Chevrolet | DGM Racing with Jesse Iwuji Motorsports | 92 | Natalie Decker | Steve Addington | 1 | |
| Chevrolet | DGM Racing with Jesse Iwuji Motorsports | 92 | Leland Honeyman | Steve Addington | 1 | |
| Chevrolet | Hendrick Motorsports | 17 | William Byron | Adam Wall 18; Greg Ives 1 | 2 | |
| Chevrolet | Hendrick Motorsports | 17 | Alex Bowman | Adam Wall 18; Greg Ives 1 | 1 | |
| Chevrolet | Hendrick Motorsports | 17 | Kyle Larson | Adam Wall 18; Greg Ives 1 | 3 | |
| Chevrolet | Hendrick Motorsports | 17 | Corey Day | Adam Wall 18; Greg Ives 1 | 11 | |
| Chevrolet | Hendrick Motorsports | 17 | Chase Elliott | Adam Wall 18; Greg Ives 1 | 2 | |
| Chevrolet | Hendrick Motorsports | 17 | Jake Finch | Adam Wall 18; Greg Ives 1 | 1 | |
| Chevrolet | Hendrick Motorsports | 17 | Rajah Caruth | Adam Wall 18; Greg Ives 1 | 1 | |
| Chevrolet | Jordan Anderson Racing | 32 | Jordan Anderson | Bruce Schlicker 9 Jody Measamer 11; Shane Whitbeck 3 | 3 | |
| Chevrolet | Jordan Anderson Racing | 32 | Austin Green | Bruce Schlicker 9 Jody Measamer 11; Shane Whitbeck 3 | 12 | |
| Chevrolet | Jordan Anderson Racing | 32 | Katherine Legge | Bruce Schlicker 9 Jody Measamer 11; Shane Whitbeck 3 | 7 | |
| Chevrolet | Jordan Anderson Racing | 32 | Rajah Caruth | Bruce Schlicker 9 Jody Measamer 11; Shane Whitbeck 3 | 2 | |
| Chevrolet | Jordan Anderson Racing | 32 | Andrew Patterson | Bruce Schlicker 9 Jody Measamer 11; Shane Whitbeck 3 | 1 | |
| Chevrolet | Jordan Anderson Racing | 87 | Austin Green | Jody Measamer | 3 | |
| Chevrolet | JR Motorsports | 9 | Ross Chastain | Cory Shea | 5 | |
| Chevrolet | JR Motorsports | 9 | Daniel Suárez | Cory Shea | 1 | |
| Chevrolet | JR Motorsports | 9 | Shane van Gisbergen | Cory Shea | 3 | |
| Chevrolet | JR Motorsports | 9 | Connor Mosack | Cory Shea | 1 | |
| Chevrolet | Mike Harmon Racing | 74 | Carson Ware | Mike Harmon 13; Kevin Cram 3 | 3 | |
| Chevrolet | Mike Harmon Racing | 74 | Dawson Cram | Mike Harmon 13; Kevin Cram 3 | 12 | |
| Chevrolet | Our Motorsports | 5 | Kris Wright | Dan Stillman | 19 | |
| Chevrolet | Our Motorsports | 5 | Kaz Grala | Dan Stillman | 1 | |
| Chevrolet | Pardus Racing Inc. | 50 | Preston Pardus | Dan Pardus 1 Steve Addington 3 | 4 | |
| Chevrolet | Richard Childress Racing | 3 | Austin Dillon | Andy Street | 1 | |
| Chevrolet | Richard Childress Racing | 33 | Kasey Kahne | Andy Street | 1 | |
| Ford | AM Racing | 76 | Kole Raz | Matthew Lucas | 2 | |
| Ford | RSS Racing | 29 | J. J. Yeley | Kevin Johnson 1 Eddie Troconis 1 | 1 | |
| Ford | RSS Racing | 29 | Jake Garcia | Kevin Johnson 1 Eddie Troconis 1 | 1 | |
| Toyota | Sam Hunt Racing | 24 | Ryan Truex | Brian Gainey | 2 | |
| Toyota | Sam Hunt Racing | 24 | Corey Heim | Brian Gainey | 3 | |
| Toyota | Sam Hunt Racing | 24 | Patrick Staropoli | Brian Gainey | 4 | |
| Toyota | Sam Hunt Racing | 24 | Jeffrey Earnhardt | Brian Gainey | 3 | |
| Toyota | Sam Hunt Racing | 24 | Christopher Bell | Brian Gainey | 1 | |
| Toyota | Sam Hunt Racing | 24 | Kaz Grala | Brian Gainey | 3 | |
| Toyota | Sam Hunt Racing | 24 | Alon Day | Brian Gainey | 1 | |
| Toyota | Sam Hunt Racing | 24 | Trevor Bayne | Brian Gainey | 1 | |
| Chevrolet 2 Ford 1 | Alpha Prime Racing | 5 | Caesar Bacarella | Keith Wolfe | 2 | |
| Chevrolet 2 Ford 1 | Alpha Prime Racing | 5 | Glen Reen (Note: Entry was fielded in a collaboration with Joey Gase Motorsports with Scott Osteen.) | Keith Wolfe | 1 | |
| Ford 2 Chevrolet 1 | MBM Motorsports | 66 | Tyler Tomassi | Carl Long 2 Doug Richert 1 | 2 | |
| Ford 2 Chevrolet 1 | MBM Motorsports | 66 | Mason Maggio | Carl Long 2 Doug Richert 1 | 1 | |

=== Driver changes ===
Moving teams

- Sheldon Creed will move from Joe Gibbs Racing to drive for Haas Factory Team in the No. 00.
- Brandon Jones will leave JR Motorsports and return to Joe Gibbs Racing in the No. 20 car.
- Sam Mayer will move from JR Motorsports to Haas Factory Team, where he will drive in the No. 41 car.
- Ryan Ellis will move from Alpha Prime Racing to DGM Racing.
- Anthony Alfredo will move from Our Motorsports to drive the No. 42 full-time for Young's Motorsports, replacing Leland Honeyman.
- Parker Retzlaff will not return to the Jordan Anderson Racing No. 31 car. He replaces Ryan Ellis at Alpha Prime Racing, with the No. 43 being renumbered to No. 4.
- Blaine Perkins will move from RSS Racing to Jordan Anderson Racing, replacing Parker Retzlaff in the No. 31.

Moving between series

- A. J. Allmendinger will move back to the Cup Series in 2025.
- Harrison Burton, who was released by Wood Brothers Racing in the Cup Series, will move to AM Racing and drive the No. 25 car in 2025.
- Cole Custer will move back to the Cup Series to drive for Haas Factory Team.
- Kris Wright will move from the ARCA Menards Series to replace Anthony Alfredo as the driver of the Our Motorsports No. 5 car in 2025.
- Chandler Smith will be driving for Front Row Motorsports in the Truck Series in 2025 after it was announced he would not be driving for Joe Gibbs Racing.

Retirement

- Parker Kligerman retired from full-time competition at the conclusion of the 2024 season.

Rookies

- Daniel Dye will drive the Kaulig Racing No. 10 car full-time in 2025, after running part-time for the team in 2024.
- Christian Eckes signed a deal to drive the No. 16 car for Kaulig Racing in 2024, replacing A. J. Allmendinger, who will move back to the Cup Series.
- Carson Kvapil will race full-time for JR Motorsports in the No. 1 car, replacing Sam Mayer.
- Nick Sanchez will drive full-time for Big Machine Racing in the No. 48 car in 2025, replacing Parker Kligerman.
- Connor Zilisch will drive for JR Motorsports in the No. 88 car full-time in 2025, after running part-time for the team in 2024.
- Taylor Gray will drive for Joe Gibbs Racing in the No. 54 car full-time in 2025, after running part-time for the team in 2024. Operation 300 will sponsor him for all 33 races in 2025.
- William Sawalich will drive for Joe Gibbs Racing in the No. 18 car full-time in 2025, after running part-time for the team in 2024.
- Dean Thompson will drive for Sam Hunt Racing in the No. 26 car full-time in 2025, after running part-time for the team in 2024.

=== Team changes ===
- The partnership of Tony Stewart and Gene Haas, known as Stewart–Haas Racing, was dissolved at the end of the 2024 season, with Gene Haas acquiring full ownership of the two Xfinity Series teams which will be called Haas Factory Team banner.
- Scott Osteen, who was the owner of Floridian Motorsports, a new team that debuted in the Truck Series in 2024, became a co-owner of Joey Gase Motorsports for 2025. The team returns to fielding two full-time cars in 2025 after fielding only the No. 35 full-time and the No. 53 part-time in 2024.
- Viking Motorsports, which was part of RSS Racing in 2024, is splitting off into its own team and switching to Chevy as its manufacturer for 2025.
- Beth and Randy Knighton, the owners of Knight Fire Protection, one of the sponsors of Garrett Smithley's No. 14 car for SS-Green Light Racing, will have an ownership stake (BRK Racing) of that car in 2025.
- Jesse Iwuji Motorsports will have an ownership stake with DGM Racing of their cars in 2025.

== Schedule ==
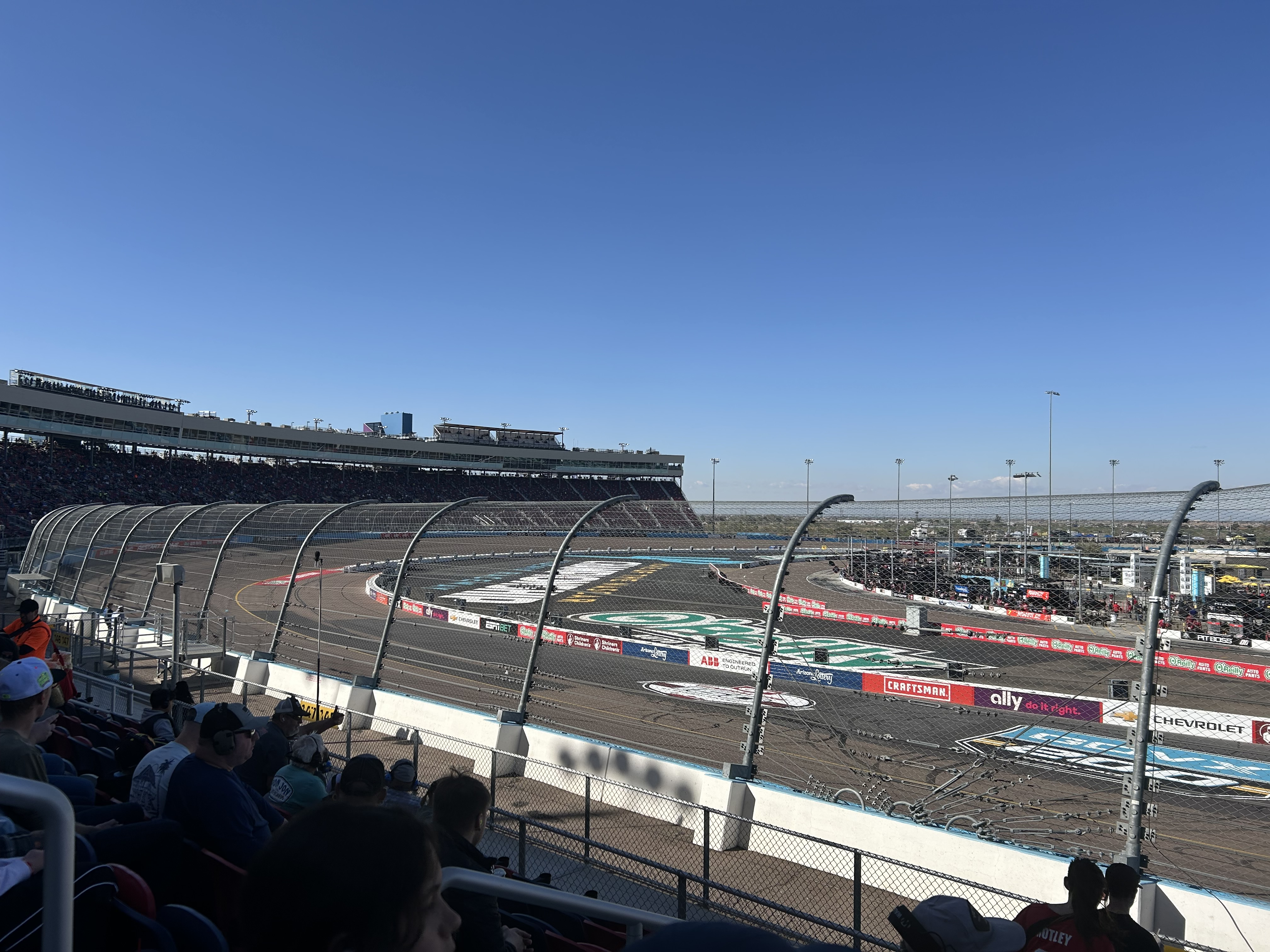
The 2025 GOVX 200 at Phoenix Raceway in March.

The 2025 schedule was released on August 29, 2024, and consists of 26 oval races, 6 road course races, one street track race. Dash 4 Cash races are bolded.

O Oval track
R Road course
S Street course

| No | Race title | Track | Location | Date | Time (ET) | TV | Radio |
|---|---|---|---|---|---|---|---|
| 1 | United Rentals 300 | O Daytona International Speedway | Daytona Beach, Florida | February 15 | 5 pm | CW | MRN |
| 2 | Bennett Transportation & Logistics 250 | O Atlanta Motor Speedway | Hampton, Georgia | February 22 | 5 pm | CW | PRN |
| 3 | Focused Health 250 | R Circuit of the Americas | Austin, Texas | March 1 | 2:30 pm | CW | PRN |
| 4 | GOVX 200 | O Phoenix Raceway | Avondale, Arizona | March 8 | 5 pm | CW | MRN |
| 5 | The LiUNA! | O Las Vegas Motor Speedway | Las Vegas, Nevada | March 15 | 4:30 pm | CW | PRN |
| 6 | **Hard Rock Bet 300** | O Homestead–Miami Speedway | Homestead, Florida | March 22 | 4 pm | CW | MRN |
| 7 | **US Marine Corps 250** | O Martinsville Speedway | Ridgeway, Virginia | March 29 | 5 pm | CW | MRN |
| 8 | Sport Clips Haircuts VFW 200 | O Darlington Raceway | Darlington, South Carolina | April 5 | 3:30 pm | CW | MRN |
| 9 | **SciAps 300** | O Bristol Motor Speedway | Bristol, Tennessee | April 12 | 5 pm | CW | MRN |
| 10 | **North Carolina Education Lottery 250** | O Rockingham Speedway | Rockingham, North Carolina | April 19 | 4 pm | CW | MRN |
| 11 | Ag-Pro 300 | O Talladega Superspeedway | Lincoln, Alabama | April 26 | 4 pm | CW | MRN |
| 12 | Andy's Frozen Custard 300 | O Texas Motor Speedway | Fort Worth, Texas | May 3 | 2 pm | CW | PRN |
| 13 | BetMGM 300 | O Charlotte Motor Speedway | Concord, North Carolina | May 24 | 4:30 pm | CW | MRN |
| 14 | Tennessee Lottery 250 | O Nashville Superspeedway | Lebanon, Tennessee | May 31 | 7:30 pm | CW | PRN |
| 15 | The Chilango 150 | R Autódromo Hermanos Rodríguez | Mexico City, Mexico | June 14 | 4:30 pm | CW | MRN |
| 16 | Explore the Pocono Mountains 250 | O Pocono Raceway | Long Pond, Pennsylvania | June 21 | 3:30 pm | CW | PRN |
| 17 | Focused Health 250 | O Atlanta Motor Speedway | Hampton, Georgia | June 27 | 7:30 pm | CW | PRN |
| 18 | The Loop 110 | S Chicago Street Course | Chicago, Illinois | July 5 | 4:30 pm | CW | MRN |
| 19 | Pit Boss/FoodMaxx 250 | R Sonoma Raceway | Sonoma, California | July 12 | 4:30 pm | CW | MRN |
| 20 | BetRivers 200 | O Dover Motor Speedway | Dover, Delaware | July 19 | 4:30 pm | CW | PRN |
| 21 | Pennzoil 250 | O Indianapolis Motor Speedway | Speedway, Indiana | July 26 | 4:30 pm | CW | IMS |
| 22 | Hy-Vee PERKS 250 | O Iowa Speedway | Newton, Iowa | August 2 | 4:30 pm | CW | MRN |
| 23 | Mission 200 at The Glen | R Watkins Glen International | Watkins Glen, New York | August 9 | 3 pm | CW | MRN |
| 24 | Wawa 250 | O Daytona International Speedway | Daytona Beach, Florida | August 22 | 7:30 pm | CW | MRN |
| 25 | Pacific Office Automation 147 | R Portland International Raceway | Portland, Oregon | August 30 | 7:30 pm | CW | MRN |
| 26 | Nu Way 200 | O World Wide Technology Raceway | Madison, Illinois | September 6 | 7:30 pm | CW | PRN |
NASCAR Xfinity Series Playoffs
Round of 12
| 27 | Food City 300 | O Bristol Motor Speedway | Bristol, Tennessee | September 12 | 7:30 pm | CW | MRN |
| 28 | Kansas Lottery 300 | O Kansas Speedway | Kansas City, Kansas | September 27 | 4 pm | CW | MRN |
| 29 | Blue Cross NC 250 | R Charlotte Motor Speedway (Roval) | Concord, North Carolina | October 4 | 5 pm | CW | PRN |
Round of 8
| 30 | Focused Health 302 | O Las Vegas Motor Speedway | Las Vegas, Nevada | October 11 | 7:30 pm | CW | PRN |
| 31 | United Rentals 250 | O Talladega Superspeedway | Lincoln, Alabama | October 18 | 4 pm | CW | MRN |
| 32 | IAA and Ritchie Bros. 250 | O Martinsville Speedway | Ridgeway, Virginia | October 25 | 7:30 pm | CW | MRN |
Championship 4
| 33 | NASCAR Xfinity Series Championship Race | O Phoenix Raceway | Avondale, Arizona | November 1 | 7:30 pm | CW | MRN |

=== Schedule changes ===
- The series will return to Autodromo Hermanos Rodriguez for the first time since the 2008 Corona Mexico 200.
- Rockingham Speedway will return to the series for the first time since 2004.
- Gateway will return to the series after a 14-year absence.
- Bristol earns a second date, while Michigan, New Hampshire and Richmond are removed from the Xfinity series' schedule, and Darlington loses its second date, albeit in a one-year only situation.

== Season summary ==
=== Regular season ===
Round 1: United Rentals 300

Justin Allgaier scored the pole for the race. Austin Hill dominated most of the race, sweeping the stages and leading the most laps however, Hill would finish 33rd after an early incident. After Connor Zilisch hit the wall, the race went into an overtime finish. In the end, Jesse Love would hold on and earn his second career win and his first of the season.

Round 2: Bennett Transportation & Logistics 250

Jesse Love scored the pole for the race. Austin Hill swept the stages for the second straight week and led the most laps, securing his 11th career Xfinity victory and his first of the season. This win also marked Hill's third consecutive victory in the spring Atlanta race and tied him with Dale Earnhardt Jr. and Tony Stewart for the most superspeedway wins in series history, each with eight.

Round 3: Focused Health 250

Connor Zilisch started on the pole. William Byron would win the first stage and Harrison Burton won the second stage. Zilisch would navigate through late-race adversity, and continued his road course dominance by winning and earning his second career Xfinity win and his first of the season.

Round 4: GOVX 200

Alex Bowman scored the pole for the race. Bowman won the first stage and Justin Allgaier won the second stage. With four laps to go, Nick Leitz hit the wall which sent the race into overtime. On the restart, Bowman had the lead but Aric Almirola edged Bowman at the line at 0.045 seconds, the 26th closest finish in NASCAR Xfinity Series history.

Round 5: The LiUNA!

Sammy Smith scored the pole for the race. Justin Allgaier won the first stage and Aric Almirola won the second stage. In the end, Allgaier would edge out Almirola to earn his 26th career Xfinity Series victory and first of the season.

Round 6: Hard Rock Bet 300

Taylor Gray won the pole. Sammy Smith won the first stage and Kyle Larson won the second stage. In overtime, Justin Allgaier would hold off Sam Mayer to earn his 27th career Xfinity Series victory and second in a row. In addition, Allgaier would earn $100,000 in part of the Dash 4 Cash event.

Round 7: US Marine Corps 250

Connor Zilisch won the pole. Zilisch swept the stages for the first time in his career. With a highly controversial overtime finish, Austin Hill would steal the win on the final lap after Sammy Smith spun the leader Taylor Gray in the final turn. Hill snuck his way through to earn his 12th career Xfinity Series victory, and his second of the season. In addition, Hill would earn $100,000 in part of the Dash 4 Cash event.

Round 8: Sport Clips Haircuts VFW 200

Christopher Bell won the pole. Harrison Burton won the first stage and Justin Allgaier won the second stage. In the end, Brandon Jones would snap an 98-race winless streak to earn his 6th Xfinity Series victory and his first of the season.

Round 9: SciAps 300

Kyle Larson won the pole. Sam Mayer won the first stage after a wreck occurred, involving Brennan Poole and Sheldon Creed, Dash 4 Cash drivers, sending the red flag out for 14 minutes. Larson won the second stage and won the race for his 16th Xfinity Series win and first of the season. Justin Allgaier would earn $100,000 in part of the Dash 4 Cash event.

Round 10: North Carolina Education Lottery 250

Connor Zilisch won the pole. Nick Sanchez won the first stage, his first career Xfinity stage and Dean Thompson won the second stage, his and his team's first stage win. In the end, Jesse Love initially won, but was disqualified after failing post race inspection; as a result, Sammy Smith was declared the winner, Smith's third career Xfinity Series win, and his first of the season.

Round 11: Ag-Pro 300

Jesse Love won the pole and the first stage, while his teammate Austin Hill won the second stage. On lap 100, Aric Almirola moved to the top lane on the backstretch but wasn't clear, causing contact with Katherine Legge and also collecting Jeffrey Earnhardt and Brandon Jones. On the final lap, Connor Zilisch made a late block on Love, resulting in Zilisch hitting the inside wall hard. After a lengthy review involving Love, Hill, and Jeb Burton, Hill was declared the winner.

Round 12: Andy's Frozen Custard 300

Austin Hill scored the provisional pole for the race after practice and qualifying was cancelled. Justin Allgaier won the first stage and Hill won the second stage. Kyle Larson, substituting for Connor Zilisch, would take over the lead in the final stages, and held off the field in two-overtime restarts to earn his 17th career Xfinity Series win, and second of the season.

Round 13: BetMGM 300

Taylor Gray won the pole. William Byron swept the stages and won after an overtime attempt over Justin Allgaier.

Round 14: Tennessee Lottery 250

William Sawalich won the pole. Justin Allgaier swept the stages and held off teammate Connor Zilisch for the win.

Round 15: The Chilango 150

Connor Zilisch won the pole. Carson Kvapil won stage one and Sammy Smith won stage two. Daniel Suárez led the final 19 laps and held off a hard-charging Taylor Gray to earn his fourth career NASCAR Xfinity Series win—and his first of the season. Gray finished second, with Austin Hill rounding out the podium in third.

Round 16: Explore the Pocono Mountains 250

Chase Elliott won the pole. Brandon Jones won stage one, and Connor Zilisch won stage two and the race. Dale Earnhardt Jr., filling in for the suspended Mardy Lindley, earned his first win as a crew chief.

Round 17: Focused Health 250 (Atlanta)

Sheldon Creed won the pole. Taylor Gray won stage one and Brandon Jones won stage two on Friday. In a wreck-filled race, Nick Sanchez took the lead on the final restart and held off the field to earn his first career NASCAR Xfinity Series win on Saturday.

Round 18: The Loop 110

Shane van Gisbergen won the pole. van Gisbergen won stage one while Sheldon Creed won stage two. van Gisbergen won the race, but with setbacks. During the race, van Gisbergen experienced a cool suit malfunction, and his car also had a balky carburetor.

Round 19: Pit Boss/FoodMaxx 250

Shane van Gisbergen won the pole. Sam Mayer won stage one while Brandon Jones won stage two. While battling a hard-charging van Gisbergen, Connor Zilisch managed to defend his position and win the race.

Round 20: BetRivers 200

Taylor Gray won the pole and stage one. Connor Zilisch won stage two and won the race after it was shortened with 66 laps to go due to rain. This was also the final Xfinity Series event for Our Motorsports, after they announced that they would cease operations following this race.

Round 21: Pennzoil 250

Sam Mayer won the pole and stage one. Justin Allgaier won stage two. Stage three had many rain cautions that could have ended the race with either Allgaier or Kyle Larson winning, but during the second-to-final restart, Allgaier and Larson were involved in an accident. With five laps remaining, coming out of Turn three, Aric Almirola made contact with the back of Austin Hill's car, causing Hill to get loose and drift up the track. As Hill regained control, he came back down and hooked Almirola in the right-rear quarter panel, sending him head-on into the outside wall. Almirola was evaluated and released from the infield care center, while Hill received a five-lap penalty for reckless driving. On Tuesday following the race, Hill received a one-race suspension for the incident. Connor Zilisch won his fifth of the season, and his third consecutive win, and this was also the 100th victory for JR Motorsports in the Xfinity Series.

Round 22: Hy-Vee PERKS 250

Jesse Love won the pole. Connor Zilisch won stage one while Ross Chastain won stage two. Sam Mayer would go on to win the race, his first with Haas Factory Team and Ford's first of the season.

Round 23: Mission 200 at The Glen

Connor Zilisch won the pole. Justin Allgaier won stage one while Zilisch won stage two. With eight laps to go, Austin Hill tagged Michael McDowell from behind through turns 5 and 6, causing McDowell to hit two different sides and creating a 16-car pileup. A red flag waved to stop the race for 45 minutes for debris pickup and track repairs. Following the resumption of the race, Zilisch would clinch his sixth race win of the season. However, while in Victory Lane celebrating the win, Zilisch slipped off his car and fell head first to the ground. Zilisch was taken to a local hospital where it was revealed he suffered only a broken collarbone.

Round 24: Wawa 250

Connor Zilisch won the pole. After running the first 14 laps of the race, Zilisch was substituted by Parker Kligerman during the first caution for the rest of the race. Sammy Smith won stage one while Justin Allgaier won stage two. After surviving late-race chaos, Kligerman miraculously was leading the race when the final caution came on the final lap, giving him the victory. However, as Zilisch started the race, he was credited with his seventh race win of the season.

Round 25: Pacific Office Automation 147

Connor Zilisch won the pole. Zilisch swept the stages and would lead 70 of 78 laps to win the race, his third straight win and eighth overall of the season.

Round 26: Nu Way 200

Connor Zilisch won the pole. Zilisch won stage one while Justin Allgaier won stage two. Zilisch would lead 121 of 160 laps and win the race, his fourth straight victory and ninth overall of the season. Zilisch's victory made him only the third driver in Xfinity Series history to win four straight races, joining Sam Ard (1983) and Noah Gragson (2022). Zilisch also became the highest winning rookie driver in series history. Zilisch would secure the Regular Season championship.

=== Playoffs ===
Round 27: Food City 300

Justin Allgaier won the pole. Allgaier won stage one while Connor Zilisch won stage two. Despite Allgaier, Zilisch and Sam Mayer leading large chunks of the race, Aric Almirola would lead the final 34 laps to win the race.

Round 28: Kansas Lottery 300

Brandon Jones won the pole. Justin Allgaier swept the stages. Jones would lead the final 37 laps to win his second race of the season and seventh of his career. This marked Jones' first multi-race win season since 2020.

Round 29: Blue Cross NC 250

Connor Zilisch won the pole. Zilisch won stage one while Jesse Love won stage two. Zilisch led 61 of 68 laps to win his 10th race of the season. Following the race, Taylor Gray, Nick Sanchez, Austin Hill, and Harrison Burton were eliminated from playoff contention.

Round 30: Focused Health 302

Justin Allgaier won the pole. Aric Almirola would sweep the stages, lead the most laps and win the race, advancing Joe Gibbs Racing's No. 19 into the Owner's Championship.

Round 31: United Rentals 250

Jesse Love won the pole. Austin Hill would sweep the stages, lead the most laps and win the race. Despite being eliminated from playoff contention, Hill was able to qualify Richard Childress Racing's No. 21 into the Owner's Championship.

Round 32: IAA and Ritchie Bros. 250

Harrison Burton won the pole. Justin Allgaier won stage one, advancing to the Championship 4 along with Connor Zilisch. Carson Kvapil won stage two, aiding his drive to advance to the Championship 4. Overcoming a wreck-filled race, Taylor Gray would hold off Playoff driver Sammy Smith to win his first career Xfinity Series race. Kvapil and Jesse Love would advance to the Championship 4 while Smith, Brandon Jones, Sam Mayer and Sheldon Creed were eliminated.

Round 33: NASCAR Xfinity Series Championship Race

Brandon Jones won the pole. Taylor Gray won stage one while Justin Allgaier won stage two. After surviving early-race struggles, Jesse Love would pass Connor Zilisch for the lead with 24 laps to go, holding on to win the race and the Xfinity Series Championship. Aric Almirola would overtake Zilisch for second place, giving Joe Gibbs Racing's No. 19 the Owner's Championship.

Love's championship victory rekindled controversy and heavy criticism against the current Playoff points format, mainly questioning the legitimacy of how the format crowns a champion. This is in reference to Zilisch's historic 10-win season, where in any past points systems Zilisch would have been crowned the champion by a wide margin.

== Results and standings ==
=== Race results ===
| No. | Race | Pole position | Most laps led | Fastest race lap | Winning driver | Winning team | No. | Manufacturer | Report |
|---|---|---|---|---|---|---|---|---|---|
| 1 | United Rentals 300 | Justin Allgaier | Austin Hill | Jeremy Clements | Jesse Love | Richard Childress Racing | 2 | Chevrolet | Report |
| 2 | Bennett Transportation & Logistics 250 | Jesse Love | Austin Hill | Christian Eckes | Austin Hill | Richard Childress Racing | 21 | Chevrolet | Report |
| 3 | Focused Health 250 | Connor Zilisch | Connor Zilisch | Carson Kvapil | Connor Zilisch | JR Motorsports | 88 | Chevrolet | Report |
| 4 | GOVX 200 | Alex Bowman | Justin Allgaier | Justin Allgaier | Aric Almirola | Joe Gibbs Racing | 19 | Toyota | Report |
| 5 | The LiUNA! | Sammy Smith | Justin Allgaier | Connor Zilisch | Justin Allgaier | JR Motorsports | 7 | Chevrolet | Report |
| 6 | Hard Rock Bet 300 | Taylor Gray | Kyle Larson | Jesse Love | Justin Allgaier | JR Motorsports | 7 | Chevrolet | Report |
| 7 | US Marine Corps 250 | Connor Zilisch | Connor Zilisch | Sammy Smith | Austin Hill | Richard Childress Racing | 21 | Chevrolet | Report |
| 8 | Sport Clips Haircuts VFW 200 | Christopher Bell | Justin Allgaier | Taylor Gray | Brandon Jones | Joe Gibbs Racing | 20 | Toyota | Report |
| 9 | SciAps 300 | Kyle Larson | Kyle Larson | Kyle Larson | Kyle Larson | Hendrick Motorsports | 17 | Chevrolet | Report |
| 10 | North Carolina Education Lottery 250 | Connor Zilisch | Ryan Sieg | Ryan Sieg | Sammy Smith | JR Motorsports | 8 | Chevrolet | Report |
| 11 | Ag-Pro 300 | Jesse Love | Jesse Love | Jeremy Clements | Austin Hill | Richard Childress Racing | 21 | Chevrolet | Report |
| 12 | Andy's Frozen Custard 300 | Austin Hill | Justin Allgaier | Justin Allgaier | Kyle Larson | JR Motorsports | 88 | Chevrolet | Report |
| 13 | BetMGM 300 | Taylor Gray | Justin Allgaier | Justin Allgaier | William Byron | Hendrick Motorsports | 17 | Chevrolet | Report |
| 14 | Tennessee Lottery 250 | William Sawalich | Justin Allgaier | Justin Allgaier | Justin Allgaier | JR Motorsports | 7 | Chevrolet | Report |
| 15 | The Chilango 150 | Connor Zilisch | Daniel Suárez | Connor Zilisch | Daniel Suárez | JR Motorsports | 9 | Chevrolet | Report |
| 16 | Explore the Pocono Mountains 250 | Chase Elliott | Chase Elliott | Chase Elliott | Connor Zilisch | JR Motorsports | 88 | Chevrolet | Report |
| 17 | Focused Health 250 | Sheldon Creed | Aric Almirola | Austin Hill | Nick Sanchez | Big Machine Racing | 48 | Chevrolet | Report |
| 18 | The Loop 110 | Shane van Gisbergen | Shane van Gisbergen | Shane van Gisbergen | Shane van Gisbergen | JR Motorsports | 9 | Chevrolet | Report |
| 19 | Pit Boss/FoodMaxx 250 | Shane van Gisbergen | Connor Zilisch | Shane van Gisbergen | Connor Zilisch | JR Motorsports | 88 | Chevrolet | Report |
| 20 | BetRivers 200 | Taylor Gray | Connor Zilisch | Brandon Jones | Connor Zilisch | JR Motorsports | 88 | Chevrolet | Report |
| 21 | Pennzoil 250 | Sam Mayer | Justin Allgaier | Sam Mayer | Connor Zilisch | JR Motorsports | 88 | Chevrolet | Report |
| 22 | Hy-Vee PERKS 250 | Jesse Love | Ross Chastain | Ross Chastain | Sam Mayer | Haas Factory Team | 41 | Ford | Report |
| 23 | Mission 200 at The Glen | Connor Zilisch | Connor Zilisch | Connor Zilisch | Connor Zilisch | JR Motorsports | 88 | Chevrolet | Report |
| 24 | Wawa 250 | Connor Zilisch | Ryan Sieg | Aric Almirola | Connor Zilisch | JR Motorsports | 88 | Chevrolet | Report |
| 25 | Pacific Office Automation 147 | Connor Zilisch | Connor Zilisch | Connor Zilisch | Connor Zilisch | JR Motorsports | 88 | Chevrolet | Report |
| 26 | Nu Way 200 | Connor Zilisch | Connor Zilisch | Connor Zilisch | Connor Zilisch | JR Motorsports | 88 | Chevrolet | Report |
NASCAR Xfinity Series Playoffs
Round of 12
| 27 | Food City 300 | Justin Allgaier | Connor Zilisch | Connor Zilisch | Aric Almirola | Joe Gibbs Racing | 19 | Toyota | Report |
| 28 | Kansas Lottery 300 | Brandon Jones | Justin Allgaier | Brandon Jones | Brandon Jones | Joe Gibbs Racing | 20 | Toyota | Report |
| 29 | Blue Cross NC 250 | Connor Zilisch | Connor Zilisch | Connor Zilisch | Connor Zilisch | JR Motorsports | 88 | Chevrolet | Report |
Round of 8
| 30 | Focused Health 302 | Justin Allgaier | Aric Almirola | Connor Zilisch | Aric Almirola | Joe Gibbs Racing | 19 | Toyota | Report |
| 31 | United Rentals 250 | Jesse Love | Austin Hill | Josh Williams | Austin Hill | Richard Childress Racing | 21 | Chevrolet | Report |
| 32 | IAA and Ritchie Bros. 250 | Harrison Burton | Taylor Gray | Justin Allgaier | Taylor Gray | Joe Gibbs Racing | 54 | Toyota | Report |
Championship 4
| 33 | NASCAR Xfinity Series Championship Race | Brandon Jones | Justin Allgaier | Brandon Jones | Jesse Love | Richard Childress Racing | 2 | Chevrolet | Report |

=== Drivers' championship ===
(key) Bold – Pole position awarded by time. Italics – Pole position set by competition-based formula. * – Most laps led. ^{F} – Fastest lap. ^{1} – Stage 1 winner. ^{2} – Stage 2 winner. ^{1–10} – Regular season top 10 finishers.
. – Eliminated after Round of 12 . – Eliminated after Round of 8

| Pos | Driver | DAY | ATL | COA | PHO | LVS | HOM | MAR | DAR | BRI | ROC | TAL | TEX | CLT | NSH | MXC | POC | ATL | CSC | SON | DOV | IND | IOW | GLN | DAY | PIR | GTW | BRI | KAN | ROV | LVS | TAL | MAR | PHO | Pts. | Stage | Bonus |
|---|---|---|---|---|---|---|---|---|---|---|---|---|---|---|---|---|---|---|---|---|---|---|---|---|---|---|---|---|---|---|---|---|---|---|---|---|---|
| 1 | Jesse Love | 1 | **16** | 6 | 9 | 3 | 6^{F} | 37 | 11 | 6 | 37 | **3***^{1} | 7 | 12 | 8 | 18 | 2 | 6 | 6 | 38 | 5 | 9 | **2** | 14 | 4 | 10 | 5 | 25 | 7 | 12^{2} | 6 | **10** | 23 | 1 | 4040 | – | 14^{4} |
| 2 | Connor Zilisch **(R)** | 27 | 34 | **1*** | 16 | 9^{F} | 12 | **28***^{12} | 6 | 12 | **13** | 27 | | 2 | 2 | **5**^{F} | 1^{2} | 4 | 2 | 1* | 1*^{2} | 1 | 4^{1} | **1***^{2F} | 1 | **1***^{12F} | **1***^{1F} | 5*^{2F} | 2 | **1***^{1F} | 2^{F} | 23 | 9 | 3 | 4034 | – | 71^{1} |
| 3 | Justin Allgaier | 18 | 2 | 29 | 5*^{2F} | 1*^{1} | 1 | 3 | 3*^{2} | 3 | 21 | 4 | 35*^{1F} | 4*^{F} | 1*^{12F} | 34 | 10 | 31 | 23 | 6 | 4 | 36*^{2} | 16 | 6^{1} | 3^{2} | 15 | 28^{2} | **6**^{1} | 13*^{12} | 8 | **3** | 3 | 26^{1F} | 5*^{2} | 4032 | – | 38^{2} |
| 4 | Carson Kvapil **(R)** | 4 | 23 | 23^{F} | 26 | 17 | 10 | 20 | 5 | 2 | 16 | 17 | 19 | 17 | 9 | 19^{1} | 6 | 2 | 16 | 8 | 15 | 30 | 9 | 5 | 10 | 6 | 37 | 4 | 15 | 15 | 15 | 2 | 18^{2} | 13 | 4024 | – | 5^{7} |
NASCAR Xfinity Series Playoffs cut-off
| Pos | Driver | DAY | ATL | COA | PHO | LVS | HOM | MAR | DAR | BRI | ROC | TAL | TEX | CLT | NSH | MXC | POC | ATL | CSC | SON | DOV | IND | IOW | GLN | DAY | PIR | GTW | BRI | KAN | ROV | LVS | TAL | MAR | PHO | Pts. | Stage | Bonus |
| 5 | Brandon Jones | 37 | 13 | 30 | 3 | 6 | 7 | 22 | 1 | 5 | 12 | 28 | 9 | 19 | 13 | 25 | 18^{1} | 14^{2} | 21 | 13^{2} | 3^{F} | 32 | 23 | 9 | 6 | 18 | 4 | 11 | **1**^{F} | 18 | 13 | 26 | 3 | **4**^{F} | 2240 | 15 | 18^{6} |
| 6 | Austin Hill | 33*^{12} | 1*^{12} | 4 | 37 | 4 | 3 | 1 | 16 | 24 | 6 | 1^{2} | 4^{2} | 7 | 7 | 3 | 35 | 26^{F} | 4 | 12 | 13 | 34 | | 4 | 25 | 5 | 12 | 19 | 3 | 28 | 10 | 1*^{12} | 12 | 9 | 2230 | 49 | –^{5} |
| 7 | Taylor Gray **(R)** | 5 | 38 | 7 | 6 | 19 | **23** | 29 | 33^{F} | 19 | 5 | 11 | 2 | **30** | 25 | 2 | 9 | 5^{1} | 34 | 7 | **7**^{1} | 3 | 17 | 18 | 30 | 14 | 17 | 14 | 6 | 13 | 8 | 31 | 1* | 7^{1} | 2228 | 34 | 5^{8} |
| 8 | Sammy Smith | 24 | 4 | 11 | 14 | **14** | 21^{1} | 10^{F} | 9 | 4 | 1 | 31 | 18 | 38 | 10 | 10^{2} | 8 | 33 | 7 | 9 | 24 | 7 | 15 | 3 | 2^{1} | 22 | 33 | 37 | 4 | 3 | 20 | 9 | 2 | 6 | 2222 | 10 | 9^{10} |
| 9 | Sheldon Creed | 3 | 14 | 12 | 36 | 10 | 5 | 2 | 10 | 37 | 35 | 9 | 36 | 10 | 4 | 11 | 36 | **32** | 3^{2} | 10 | 8 | 17 | 7 | 35 | 17 | 27 | 30 | 2 | 5 | 11 | 11 | 34 | 4 | 8 | 2218 | 21 | 3^{9} |
| 10 | Sam Mayer | 2 | 36 | 3 | 7 | 5 | 2 | 5 | 14 | 11^{1} | 26 | 14 | 5 | 11 | 3 | 23 | 7 | 3 | 8 | 17^{1} | 12 | **2**^{1F} | 1 | 2 | 5 | 16 | 35 | 3 | 16 | 19 | 9 | 38 | 7 | | 2204 | 19 | 16^{3} |
| 11 | Nick Sanchez **(R)** | 35 | 5 | 24 | 10 | 20 | 8 | 32 | 8 | 16 | 31^{1} | 15 | 20 | 3 | 14 | 31 | 28 | 1 | 5 | 4 | 37 | 33 | 19 | 24 | 23 | 3 | 25 | 13 | 8 | 9 | 5 | 20 | 19 | 15 | 2198 | 22 | 6 |
| 12 | Harrison Burton | 6 | 10 | 35^{2} | 20 | 8 | 11 | 24 | 13^{1} | 26 | 3 | 8 | 6 | 21 | 12 | 9 | 14 | 13 | 13 | 21 | 11 | 18 | 5 | 10 | 16 | 12 | 22 | 7 | 20 | 34 | 14 | 13 | **11** | 11 | 2163 | 12 | 2 |
| 13 | Christian Eckes **(R)** | 12 | 29^{F} | 5 | 8 | 13 | 38 | 34 | 7 | 9 | 23 | 25 | 38 | 9 | 35 | 4 | 3 | 19 | 15 | 34 | 10 | 13 | 10 | 8 | 32 | 4 | 3 | 8 | 14 | 10 | 18 | 4 | 27 | 16 | 784 | 94 | – |
| 14 | Jeb Burton | 16 | 6 | 25 | 15 | 23 | 15 | 11 | 15 | 21 | 8 | 2 | 10 | 20 | 15 | 8 | 11 | 16 | 27 | 20 | 20 | 15 | 29 | 16 | 20 | 7 | 36 | 18 | 30 | 6 | 26 | 17 | 6 | 38 | 719 | 63 | – |
| 15 | Ryan Sieg | 19 | 20 | 19 | 4 | 7 | 22 | 8 | 12 | 7 | 18* | 36 | 8 | 14 | 21 | 29 | 5 | 30 | 38 | 35 | 6 | 5 | 8 | 28 | 31* | 24 | 27 | 23 | 19 | 20 | 7 | 35 | 15 | 37 | 691 | 102 | – |
| 16 | Dean Thompson **(R)** | 8 | 35 | 18 | 38 | 15 | 13 | 6 | 18 | 10 | 11^{2} | 18 | 27 | 5 | 33 | 12 | 17 | 11 | 14 | 18 | 16 | 10 | 31 | 13 | 7 | 32 | 16 | 12 | 10 | 35 | 28 | 29 | 8 | 17 | 690 | 57 | 1 |
| 17 | Aric Almirola | | 3 | | 1 | 2^{2} | | 13 | | | | 33 | | | 6 | | | 7* | | | 2 | 35 | | | 24^{F} | | 6 | 1 | | 14 | 1*^{12} | 24 | 5* | 2 | 652 | 188 | 6 |
| 18 | William Sawalich **(R)** | 28 | 9 | 9 | 13 | 38 | 24 | 27 | 35 | 34 | 25 | 37 | 13 | 15 | **34** | 6 | 21 | 36 | 37 | 3 | 9 | 6 | 11 | 26 | 12 | 2 | 2 | 15 | 11 | 7 | 12 | 30 | | | 636 | 71 | – |
| 19 | Brennan Poole | 30 | 17 | 20 | 17 | 22 | 14 | 4 | 19 | 36 | 4 | 19 | 17 | 22 | 16 | 38 | 16 | 17 | 10 | 22 | 25 | 20 | 20 | 12 | 9 | 13 | 14 | 10 | 28 | 31 | 25 | 19 | 36 | 18 | 608 | 25 | – |
| 20 | Daniel Dye **(R)** | 38 | 7 | 17 | 19 | 12 | 9 | 7 | 17 | 13 | 9 | 10 | 11 | 31 | 38 | 13 | 31 | 8 | 19 | 32 | 21 | 8 | 36 | 17 | 35 | 11 | 10 | 26 | 12 | 36 | 17 | 25 | 33 | 28 | 604 | 41 | – |
| 21 | Jeremy Clements | 9^{F} | 11 | 28 | 21 | 24 | 26 | 14 | 21 | 20 | 10 | 26^{F} | 31 | 16 | 18 | 36 | 12 | 10 | 31 | 30 | 26 | 12 | 22 | 15 | 36 | 17 | 15 | 9 | 32 | 27 | 36 | 37 | 34 | 33 | 501 | 21 | – |
| 22 | Parker Retzlaff | 29 | 27 | DNQ | 11 | 21 | 17 | 12 | 20 | 18 | 2 | 38 | 14 | 37 | 37 | 35 | 22 | 37 | 24 | 28 | 19 | 14 | 13 | 22 | 38 | 30 | 8 | 16 | 27 | 16 | 30 | 7 | 29 | 27 | 479 | 12 | – |
| 23 | Josh Williams | 20 | 15 | 15 | 12 | 29 | 19 | 17 | 36 | 14 | 7 | 29 | 37 | 6 | 17 | 20 | 15 | 38 | 11 | 15 | 27 | 22 | | | 34 | 23 | | 28 | 24 | 37 | 23 | 14^{F} | 28 | 26 | 474 | 16 | – |
| 24 | Anthony Alfredo | 22 | 37 | 21 | 32 | 18 | 18 | 38 | 31 | 15 | 15 | 6 | 12 | 25 | 29 | 21 | 13 | 29 | 36 | 23 | 23 | 23 | 26 | 32 | 37 | 33 | 13 | 22 | 25 | 23 | 24 | 33 | 16 | 23 | 471 | 39 | – |
| 25 | Kyle Sieg | 36 | 33 | 27 | 18 | 11 | 27 | 35 | 30 | 22 | 20 | 23 | 22 | 33 | 26 | 28 | 25 | 9 | 20 | 25 | 36 | 16 | 18 | 30 | 27 | 26 | 24 | 21 | 17 | 33 | 21 | 15 | 21 | 12 | 467 | 32 | – |
| 26 | Blaine Perkins | 34 | 19 | 10 | 24 | 26 | 25 | 19 | 28 | 30 | 32 | 7 | 24 | 24 | 30 | 27 | 29 | 22 | 18 | 19 | 32 | 27 | 28 | 23 | 14 | 9 | 23 | 34 | 36 | 29 | 27 | 6 | 20 | 25 | 456 | 15 | – |
| 27 | Matt DiBenedetto | 11 | 12 | 32 | 27 | 16 | 36 | 26 | 23 | 23 | 27 | 5 | 15 | 36 | 32 | 16 | 19 | 15 | 28 | 26 | 14 | 11 | 35 | 33 | 33 | 34 | 11 | 24 | 23 | 32 | 19 | | | | 435 | 38 | – |
| 28 | Ryan Ellis | 23 | 18 | 16 | 33 | 34 | 20 | 18 | 22 | 27 | 33 | 16 | 23 | 8 | 36 | 32 | 32 | 21 | 25 | 27 | 30 | 21 | 25 | 29 | 11 | 21 | 18 | 38 | 26 | 24 | 29 | 27 | 22 | 21 | 419 | 1 | – |
| 29 | Josh Bilicki | 14 | 30 | 22 | 23 | 31 | | | 24 | | 17 | | 28 | | | 24 | 23 | | 35 | 14 | 34 | 19 | 21 | 27 | 18 | | | 29 | | 21 | | | | 32 | 261 | 6 | – |
| 30 | Garrett Smithley | 31 | 24 | | 29 | 27 | 31 | 15 | 32 | 29 | 22 | DNQ | 30 | 26 | | | 26 | 23 | | | 35 | 25 | 33 | 38 | 8 | 25 | 32 | | 34 | DNQ | 32 | 12 | 30 | 31 | 247 | – | – |
| 31 | Leland Honeyman | 21 | 8 | | | 30 | 34 | | 37 | | | 13 | 34 | 32 | | | 24 | 12 | | | 29 | 26 | | | 26 | | | 32 | 21 | 26 | | 8 | | 24 | 242 | 12 | – |
| 32 | Corey Day | | | | | | | 21 | | | | | 16 | | 11 | | | | | 24 | | | 24 | | | | 9 | 17 | | 22 | 4 | | 13 | 14 | 238 | 6 | – |
| 33 | Austin Green | | | 26 | | 36 | | | DNQ | | 30 | DNQ | | | | 7 | | | 9 | 11 | | | | 7 | | 8 | | 31 | 29 | 2 | 31 | | 24 | | 212 | 1 | – |
| 34 | Joey Gase | 15 | 21 | | 28 | 33 | 29 | | | | | 21 | 25 | | | | | 18 | | | | 28 | 27 | | 21 | | 26 | 35 | 33 | | 35 | 16 | | 30 | 189 | – | – |
| 35 | Kris Wright | 32 | 26 | 33 | 25 | 25 | 32 | 9 | 38 | 31 | 28 | 24 | 33 | 18 | 31 | 17 | 37 | 25 | DNQ | 29 | | | | | | | | | | | | | | | 177 | – | – |
| 36 | Justin Bonsignore | 25 | | | | | 16 | | | 17 | 38 | | | | | | 38 | | | | | | 12 | | | | | | 37 | | | | 10 | 10 | 136 | 1 | – |
| 37 | Nick Leitz | | 22 | | 30 | | | | 27 | | | | 29 | 27 | 27 | | | 24 | | | 33 | | | | | | 29 | | 38 | | 34 | 11 | | 20 | 132 | – | – |
| 38 | Mason Massey | | 28 | | 22 | 37 | | | 29 | 25 | | | 21 | | 24 | | 20 | 20 | | | | 24 | 37 | | | | | | 31 | | 37 | | | | 129 | – | – |
| 39 | Thomas Annunziata | | | DNQ | 34 | | | 31 | | 28 | 29 | | | | 20 | 22 | | | 17 | | | | 32 | 37 | | 28 | 20 | | | DNQ | 38 | | 38 | | 114 | 1 | – |
| 40 | Alex Labbé | | | 14 | | | | | | 35 | | | | | | 15 | | | 12 | 37 | | | | | | 36 | | | | 30 | | | | | 97 | 15 | – |
| 41 | Brenden Queen | | | | | | | | | | | | | | | | | | | | | | | | | | | 20 | 9 | | | 36 | 35 | 19 | 88 | 22 | – |
| 42 | Caesar Bacarella | 13 | | | | | | | | | | 30 | | | | | | | | | | | | | 28 | | | | | | | 5 | | | 72 | – | – |
| 43 | Patrick Staropoli | | | | | | | 16 | | | | | | | | | | 35 | | | | | | | | | | | 22 | | | | 17 | | 58 | – | – |
| 44 | Brad Perez | | | DNQ | | | 28 | 23 | | | | | | 35 | | 26 | | | 30 | 31 | | | | | | | | | | | | | 31 | | 56 | – | – |
| 45 | Myatt Snider | | | | | | 30 | 33 | | | | | | | 22 | | | | | | | | | | | | | | | | | | 14 | | 49 | – | – |
| 46 | Ryan Truex | 17 | | | | | | | | | | | | | | | | | | | 18 | | | | | | | | | | | | | | 39 | – | – |
| 47 | David Starr | | | | | | | | 26 | | | | | | | | | | | | DNQ | 29 | | | | | | | | | | 18 | | | 38 | – | – |
| 48 | Jordan Anderson | 7 | | | | | | | | | | | | | | | | | | | | | | | | | 38 | | | | | 32 | | | 36 | – | – |
| 49 | Carson Ware | DNQ | 32 | | | | | 30 | | | | | | DNQ | | | 34 | | | | | | | | | | | 33 | | | | 21 | | | 35 | – | – |
| 50 | Jeffrey Earnhardt | | | | | | | | | | | 32 | | | 19 | | | | | | | | | | | | | 27 | | | | | | | 33 | – | – |
| 51 | C. J. McLaughlin | DNQ | 25 | | | | | | | 33 | | | DNQ | 29 | | | | 28 | | | | | | | | | | | | | | | | | 33 | – | – |
| 52 | Logan Bearden | | | | | | | | | | | | | | 23 | | 27 | | | | | 38 | | | | | | 30 | | | | | | | 32 | – | – |
| 53 | Sage Karam | | | 34 | | | | | | | | | | | | 33 | | | DNQ | 36 | | | | | | | | | | 25 | | | | | 29 | 8 | – |
| 54 | Lavar Scott | | | | | | | | | | | | | | | | | | | | 28 | | | | | | 19 | | | | | | | | 27 | – | – |
| 55 | Glen Reen | | | | | | | | | | | | | | DNQ | | | | | | DNQ | | | 21 | | | 31 | | DNQ | | | | | 34 | 25 | – | – |
| 56 | Kasey Kahne | | | | | | | | | | 14 | | | | | | | | | | | | | | | | | | | | | | | | 23 | – | – |
| 57 | Will Rodgers | | | | | | | | | | | | | | | | | | | 16 | | | | | | | | | | | | | | | 23 | 2 | – |
| 58 | Jake Finch | | | | | | | | | | | | | | | | | | | | 17 | | | | | | | | | | | | | | 20 | – | – |
| 59 | Dawson Cram | | | | 35 | 32 | DNQ | DNQ | DNQ | | DNQ | | DNQ | DNQ | | | 33 | | | | | 31 | 38 | | | | | | | | | | | 36 | 19 | – | – |
| 60 | Joey Hand | | | | | | | | | | | | | | | | | | | | | | | | | 19 | | | | | | | | | 18 | – | – |
| 61 | Jesse Iwuji | | | | | | | | | | | 20 | | | | | | | | | | | | | | | | | | | | | | | 17 | – | – |
| 62 | Austin J. Hill | | | | | | | | | | | | | | | | | | | DNQ | | | | 20 | | | | | | DNQ | | | | | 17 | – | – |
| 63 | Alon Day | | | | | | | | | | | | | | | | | | | | | | | | | 20 | | | | | | | | | 17 | – | – |
| 64 | Jack Perkins | | | | | | | | | | | | | | | | | | 32 | | | | | | | 31 | | | | | | | | | 17 | 6 | – |
| 65 | Natalie Decker | | | | | | | | | | | | | | | | | | | | | | | | 22 | | | | | | | | | | 15 | – | – |
| 66 | Vicente Salas | | | | | | | | | | 24 | | | | | | | | | | | | | | | 37 | | | | | | | | | 14 | – | – |
| 67 | Preston Pardus | | | 36 | | | | | | | | | | | | | | | 29 | | | | | 34 | | | | | | 38 | | | DNQ | | 13 | – | – |
| 68 | J. J. Yeley | DNQ | | | | | | | | | QL^{¶} | | | 28 | | | | | | | | | | | | | | | | | | | | | 9 | – | – |
| 69 | Takuma Koga | | | | | | | | | | | | | | | | | | | | | | | | | 29 | | | | | | | 37 | | 9 | – | – |
| 70 | Kole Raz | | | | | | | | | | | | | | | | | | | | | | | | | | 34 | | 35 | | | | | | 5 | – | – |
| 71 | Andre Castro | | | | | | | | | | | | | | | | | | 33 | | | | | | | | | | | | | | | | 4 | – | – |
| 72 | Tyler Tomassi | | | | | | | DNQ | | DNQ | | | | | | | | | | | | | 34 | | | | | | | | | | | | 3 | – | – |
| 73 | Will Brown | | | | | | | | | | | | | | | | | | | | | | | | | 35 | | | | | | | | | 2 | – | – |
| 74 | Baltazar Leguizamón | | | 37 | | | | | | | | | | | | | | | | | | | | | | | | | | | | | | | 1 | – | – |
| 75 | Rubén Rovelo | | | | | | | | | | | | | | | 37 | | | | | | | | | | | | | | | | | | | 1 | – | – |
| | Andrew Patterson | | | | | | | | | | | | | | | | | | | | | | | | | | | | | DNQ | | | | | 0 | – | – |
Ineligible for Xfinity Series driver points
| Pos | Driver | DAY | ATL | COA | PHO | LVS | HOM | MAR | DAR | BRI | ROC | TAL | TEX | CLT | NSH | MXC | POC | ATL | CSC | SON | DOV | IND | IOW | GLN | DAY | PIR | GTW | BRI | KAN | ROV | LVS | TAL | MAR | PHO | Pts. | Stage | Bonus |
| | Kyle Larson | | | | | | 4*^{2} | | | **1***^{2F} | | | 1 | | | | | | | | | 4 | | | | | | | | | | | | | | | |
| | Shane van Gisbergen | | | | | | | | | | | | | | | | | | **1***^{1F} | **2**^{F} | | | | 31 | | | | | | | | | | | | | |
| | William Byron | | | 2^{1} | | | | | | | | | | 1^{12} | | | | | | | | | | | | | | | | | | | | | | | |
| | Chase Elliott | | | | | | | | 2 | | | | | | | | **4***^{F} | | | | | | | | | | | | | | | | | | | | |
| | Alex Bowman | | | | **2**^{1} | | | | | | | | | | | | | | | | | | | | | | | | | | | | | | | | |
| | Ross Chastain | | | 8 | | | | | 4 | | | | | | 5 | | | | | | 38 | | 3*^{2F} | | | | | | | | | | | | | | |
| | Riley Herbst | | | 13 | | | | | | | | | 3 | | | | | | | 5 | | | | 36 | | | | | | | | | | | | | |
| | Kaz Grala | | | | | | | | | | | | | | | | | | 22 | | 31 | | | 11 | | | | | | 4 | | | | | | | |
| | Connor Mosack | | | | | | | | | | | | | | | | | | 26 | 33 | | | | | | | | | | 5 | | 28 | 25 | 22 | | | |
| | Carson Hocevar | | | 38 | | | | | | | | | | | | | | | | | | | 6 | | | | | | | | | | | | | | |
| | Daniel Hemric | | | | | | | | | | | | | | | | | | | | | | | | | | 7 | | | 17 | 16 | | | | | | |
| | Corey Heim | | | 31 | | | 37 | | | 8 | | | | | | | | | | | | | | | | | | | | | | | | | | | |
| | Patrick Emerling | 10 | | | | 28 | 33 | | | | 19 | 12 | | | | | 30 | | | | | | 30 | | 13 | | | | | | | | | 35 | | | |
| | Austin Dillon | | | | | | | | | | | | | 13 | | | | | | | | | 14 | | | | | | | | | | | | | | |
| | Ty Gibbs | | | | | | | | | | | | | | | 14 | | | | | | | | | | | | | | | | | | | | | |
| | Mason Maggio | | 31 | | | | 35 | 25 | | 38 | | 22 | 26 | | 28 | | | 27 | | | | | | | 15 | | | | | | 33 | 22 | 32 | | | | |
| | Rajah Caruth | | | | | | | | | | | | | | | | | | | | 22 | | | | 29 | | | | 18 | | | | | | | | |
| | Stefan Parsons | | | | | | | | | | | | | | | | | | | | | | | 19 | | | | 36 | | | | | | 29 | | | |
| | Justin Haley | | | | | | | | | | | | | | | | | | | | | | | | 19 | | | | | | | | | | | | |
| | Matt Mills | | | | | | | | | | | | | | | | | | | | | | | | | | 21 | | | | | | | | | | |
| | Trevor Bayne | | | | | | | | | | | | | | | | | | | | | | | | | | | | | | 22 | | | | | | |
| | Chase Briscoe | | | | | | | | | | | | | 23 | | | | | | | | | | | | | | | | | | | | | | | |
| | Christopher Bell | | | | | | | | **25** | | | | | | | 39 | | | | | | | | | | | | | | | | | | | | | |
| | Michael McDowell | | | | | | | | | | | | | | | | | | | | | | | 25 | | | | | | | | | | | | | |
| | Greg Van Alst | 26 | | | 31 | 35 | | 36 | 34 | 32 | 34 | 35 | | | | | | | | | | | | | | | | | | | | | | | | | |
| | Andrés Pérez de Lara | | | | | | | | | | | | | | | 30 | | | | | | | | | | | | | | | | | | | | | |
| | Katherine Legge | | | | | | | | | | 36 | 34 | 32 | 34 | DNQ | | | 34 | | | | 37 | | | | | | | | | | | | | | | |
| | Jake Garcia | | | | | | | | | | | DNQ | | | | | | | | | | | | | | | | | | | | | | | | | |
| | Daniel Suárez | | | | | | | | | | | | | | | 1*^{«»} | | | | | | | | | | | | | | | | | | | | | |
| | Ty Dillon | | | | | RL^{†} | QL^{‡} | | | | | | | | | | | | | | | | | | | | | | | | | | | | | | |
| | Parker Kligerman | | | | | | | | | | | | | | | | | | | | | | | | RL^{¿} | | | | | | | | | | | | |
| Pos | Driver | DAY | ATL | COA | PHO | LVS | HOM | MAR | DAR | BRI | ROC | TAL | TEX | CLT | NSH | MXC | POC | ATL | CSC | SON | DOV | IND | IOW | GLN | DAY | PIR | GTW | BRI | KAN | ROV | LVS | TAL | MAR | PHO | Pts. | Stage | Bonus |
^{†} – Josh Williams was recovering from illness during the race at Las Vegas in March, and was relieved by Ty Dillon after the first stage. Since Williams started the race, he is officially credited with 29th place.^{‡} – Practiced and qualified for Josh Williams^{¶} – Qualified but replaced by Katherine Legge^{¿} – Relieved for Connor Zilisch, who was still recovering from a broken collarbone from a fall after winning the previous race at Watkins Glen^{«»} – Suárez made the race on the International Provisional, and the No. 9 entry did not receive owners points.

=== Owners' championship (Top 15) ===
(key) Bold – Pole position awarded by time. Italics – Pole position set by competition-based formula. * – Most laps led. ^{F} – Fastest lap. ^{1} – Stage 1 winner. ^{2} – Stage 2 winner. ^{1–10} – Regular season top 10 finishers.
. – Eliminated after Round of 12 . – Eliminated after Round of 8

| Pos. | No. | Car Owner | DAY | ATL | COA | PHO | LVS | HOM | MAR | DAR | BRI | ROC | TAL | TEX | CLT | NSH | MXC | POC | ATL | CSC | SON | DOV | IND | IOW | GLN | DAY | PIR | GTW | BRI | KAN | ROV | LVS | TAL | MAR | PHO | Points | Bonus |
|---|---|---|---|---|---|---|---|---|---|---|---|---|---|---|---|---|---|---|---|---|---|---|---|---|---|---|---|---|---|---|---|---|---|---|---|---|---|
| 1 | 19 | Joe Gibbs | 25 | 3 | 13 | 1 | 2^{2} | 16 | 13 | **25** | 17 | 38 | 33 | 3 | 23 | 6 | 14 | 38 | 7* | 32 | 5 | 2 | 35 | 12 | 36 | 24^{F} | 31 | 6 | 1 | 37 | 14 | 1*^{12} | 24 | 5* | 2 | 4035 | 11 |
| 2 | 88 | Dale Earnhardt Jr. | 27 | 34 | **1*** | 16 | 9^{F} | 12 | **28***^{12} | 6 | 12 | **13** | 27 | 1 | 2 | 2 | **5**^{F} | 1^{2} | 4 | 2 | 1* | 1*^{2} | 1 | 4^{1} | **1***^{2F} | 1 | **1***^{12F} | **1***^{1} | 5*^{2F} | 2 | **1***^{1F} | 2^{F} | 23 | 9 | 3 | 4034 | 76^{1} |
| 3 | 7 | Kelley Earnhardt Miller | 18 | 2 | 29 | 5*^{2F} | 1*^{1} | 1 | 3 | 3*^{2} | 3 | 21 | 4 | 35*^{1F} | 4*^{F} | 1*^{12F} | 34 | 10 | 31 | 23 | 6 | 4 | 36*^{2} | 16 | 6^{1} | 3^{2} | 15 | 28^{2} | **6**^{1} | 13*^{12} | 8 | **3** | 3 | 26^{1F} | 5*^{2} | 4032 | 38^{2} |
| 4 | 21 | Richard Childress | 8 | 1*^{12} | 4 | 37 | 4 | 3 | 1 | 16 | 24 | 6 | 1^{2} | **4**^{2} | 7 | 7 | 3 | 35 | 26^{F} | 4 | 12 | 13 | 34 | 14 | 4 | 25 | 5 | 12 | 19 | 3 | 28 | 10 | 1*^{12} | 12 | 9 | 4028 | 27^{5} |
NASCAR Xfinity Series Playoffs cut-off
| 5 | 2 | Richard Childress | 1 | **16** | 6 | 9 | 3 | 6^{F} | 37 | 11 | 6 | 37 | **3***^{1} | 7 | 12 | 8 | 18 | 2 | 6 | 6 | 38 | 5 | 9 | **2** | 14 | 4 | 10 | 5 | 25 | 7 | 12^{2} | 6 | **10** | 23 | 1 | 2258 | 14^{4} |
| 6 | 20 | Joe Gibbs | 37 | 13 | 30 | 3 | 6 | 7 | 22 | 1 | 5 | 12 | 28 | 9 | 19 | 14 | 25 | 18^{1} | 14^{2} | 21 | 13^{2} | 3^{F} | 32 | 23 | 9 | 6 | 18 | 4 | 11 | **1**^{F} | 18 | 13 | 26 | 3 | **4**^{F} | 2240 | 18^{6} |
| 7 | 1 | L. W. Miller | 4 | 23 | 23^{F} | 26 | 17 | 10 | 20 | 4 | 2 | 16 | 17 | 19 | 17 | 10 | 19^{1} | 6 | 2 | 16 | 8 | 15 | 30 | 9 | 5 | 10 | 6 | 37 | 4 | 15 | 15 | 15 | 2 | 18^{2} | 13 | 2231 | 5^{7} |
| 8 | 54 | Ty Gibbs | 5 | 38 | 7 | 6 | 19 | **23** | 29 | 33^{F} | 19 | 5 | 11 | 2 | **30** | 25 | 2 | 9 | 5^{1} | 34 | 7 | **7**^{1} | 3 | 17 | 18 | 30 | 14 | 17 | 14 | 6 | 13 | 8 | 31 | 1* | 7^{1} | 2227 | 4^{9} |
| 9 | 8 | Dale Earnhardt Jr. | 24 | 4 | 11 | 14 | **14** | 21^{1} | 10^{F} | 9 | 4 | 1 | 31 | 18 | 38 | 11 | 10^{2} | 8 | 33 | 7 | 9 | 24 | 7 | 15 | 3 | 2^{1} | 22 | 33 | 37 | 4 | 3 | 20 | 9 | 2 | 6 | 2224 | 11^{8} |
| 10 | 00 | Gene Haas | 3 | 14 | 12 | 36 | 10 | 5 | 2 | 10 | 37 | 35 | 9 | 36 | 10 | 4 | 11 | 36 | **32** | 3^{2} | 10 | 8 | 17 | 7 | 35 | 17 | 27 | 30 | 2 | 5 | 11 | 11 | 34 | 4 | 8 | 2217 | 2^{10} |
| 11 | 41 | Gene Haas | 2 | 36 | 3 | 7 | 5 | 2 | 5 | 14 | 11^{1} | 26 | 14 | 5 | 11 | 3 | 23 | 7 | 3 | 8 | 17^{1} | 12 | **2**^{1F} | 1 | 2 | 5 | 16 | 35 | 3 | 16 | 19 | 9 | 38 | 7 | 37 | 2206 | 16^{3} |
| 12 | 48 | Scott Borchetta | 35 | 5 | 24 | 10 | 20 | 8 | 32 | 8 | 16 | 31^{1} | 15 | 20 | 3 | 14 | 31 | 28 | 1 | 5 | 4 | 37 | 33 | 19 | 24 | 23 | 3 | 25 | 13 | 8 | 9 | 5 | 20 | 19 | 15 | 2198 | 6 |
| 13 | 25 | Kevin Cywinski | 6 | 10 | 35^{2} | 20 | 8 | 11 | 24 | 13^{1} | 26 | 3 | 8 | 6 | 21 | 13 | 9 | 14 | 13 | 13 | 21 | 11 | 18 | 5 | 10 | 16 | 12 | 22 | 7 | 20 | 34 | 14 | 13 | **11** | 11 | 804 | 2 |
| 14 | 16 | Matt Kaulig | 12 | 29^{F} | 5 | 8 | 13 | 38 | 34 | 7 | 9 | 23 | 25 | 38 | 9 | 35 | 4 | 3 | 19 | 15 | 34 | 10 | 13 | 10 | 8 | 32 | 4 | 3 | 8 | 14 | 10 | 18 | 4 | 27 | 16 | 784 | – |
| 15 | 27 | Jordan Anderson | 16 | 6 | 25 | 15 | 23 | 15 | 11 | 15 | 21 | 8 | 2 | 10 | 20 | 16 | 8 | 11 | 16 | 27 | 20 | 20 | 15 | 29 | 16 | 20 | 7 | 36 | 18 | 30 | 6 | 26 | 17 | 6 | 38 | 719 | – |
| Pos. | No. | Car Owner | DAY | ATL | COA | PHO | LVS | HOM | MAR | DAR | BRI | ROC | TAL | TEX | CLT | NSH | MXC | POC | ATL | CSC | SON | DOV | IND | IOW | GLN | DAY | PIR | GTW | BRI | KAN | ROV | LVS | TAL | MAR | PHO | Points | Bonus |

=== Manufacturers' championship ===
| Pos | Manufacturer | Wins | Points |
|---|---|---|---|
| 1 | Chevrolet | 26 | 1283 |
| 2 | Toyota | 6 | 1075 |
| 3 | Ford | 1 | 1021 |

== See also ==
- 2025 NASCAR Cup Series
- 2025 NASCAR Craftsman Truck Series
- 2025 ARCA Menards Series
- 2025 ARCA Menards Series East
- 2025 ARCA Menards Series West
- 2025 NASCAR Whelen Modified Tour
- 2025 NASCAR Canada Series
- 2025 NASCAR Mexico Series
- 2025 NASCAR Euro Series
- 2025 NASCAR Brasil Series
- 2025 CARS Tour
- 2025 SMART Modified Tour
