= Andrew Overstreet =

American NASCAR crew chief (born 1969)

Personal information
- Born: Andrew Overstreet; March 7, 1984 (age 42) Mooresville, North Carolina, U.S.

Sport
- Country: United States
- Sport: NASCAR O'Reilly Auto Parts Series
- Team: 7. JR Motorsports

Andrew Overstreet (born March 7, 1984) is an American NASCAR crew chief who works for JR Motorsports as the crew chief of their No. 7 Chevrolet Camaro SS in the NASCAR O'Reilly Auto Parts Series driven by Justin Allgaier. He has won 7 O'Reilly Auto Parts Series races and 1 championship as a crew chief.

Overstreet started his NASCAR career as an engineer for Hendrick Motorsports. From there, he worked for multiple teams. His crew chiefing career began in 2024 in the O'Reilly Auto Parts Series when it was known as the NASCAR Xfinity Series for JR Motorsports No. 88 car, where he helped Connor Zilisch earn his first career victory. The next year, he moved to their No. 1 team as the crew chief for Carson Kvapil. In 2026, he shifted over to the No. 7 team with Justin Allgaier. He scored six wins that year enroute to his first series championship.

== Racing career ==
Overstreet started at the Hendrick Motorsports as a teardown/mechanic, working with Greg Ives. In 2007, he moved to Red Bull Racing as a R&D data engineer, who tested with Brian Vickers, A. J. Allmendinger, and Mike Skinner.

He then rotated through different teams such as Michael Waltrip Racing, Turner Motorsports, Red Horse Racing, Kyle Busch Motorsports, and Wood Brothers Racing.

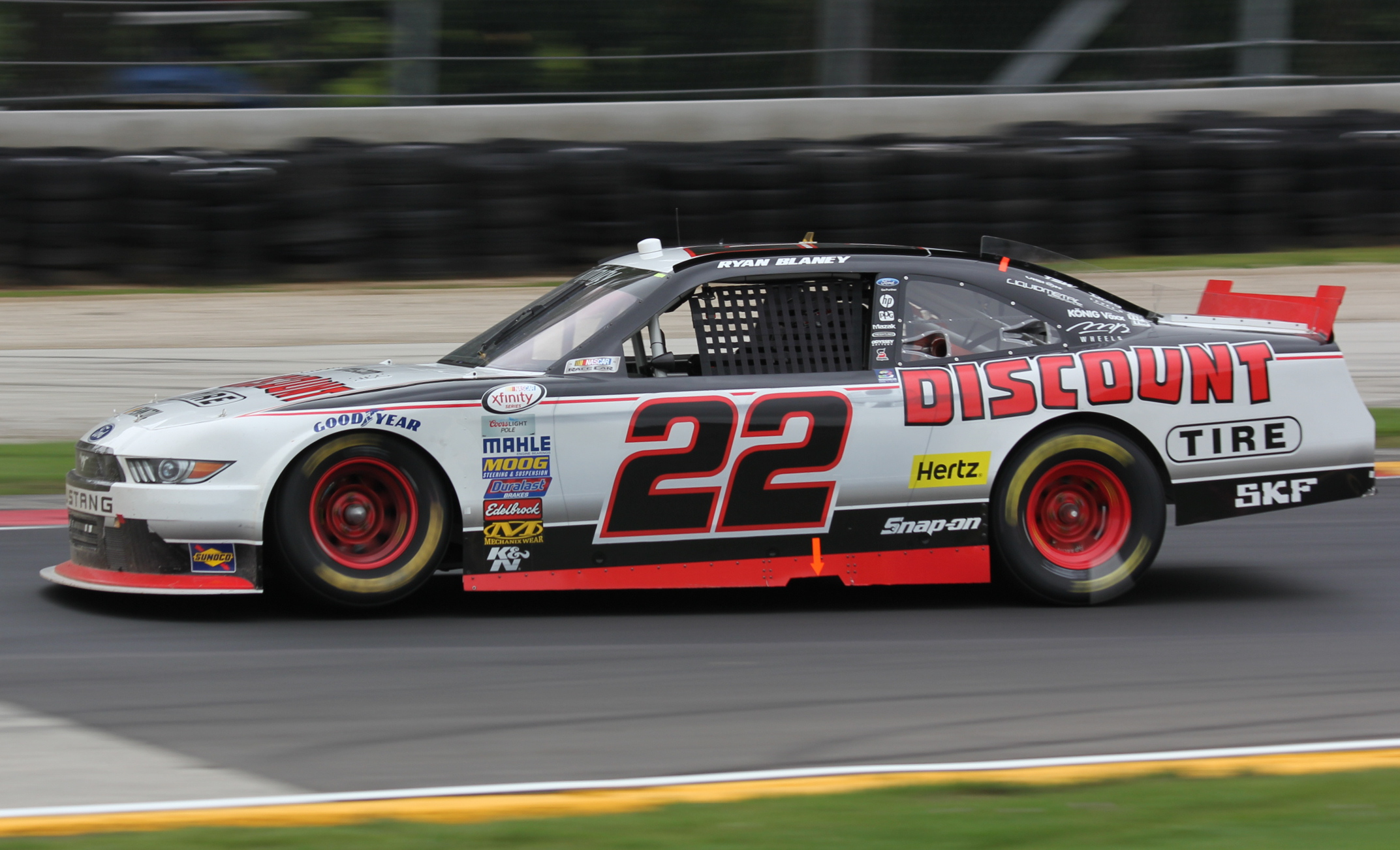
The No. 22 car of Team Penske won the Owners' championship in 2015.

In 2015, Overstreet was hired by Team Penske as their lead engineer on the No. 22 Xfinity car, who won that years owners championship.

In 2020, JR Motorsports (JRM) hired Overstreet as a race engineer. He stayed at that position until 2023.

Overstreet made his crew cheifing debut in 2024 for JRM in their No. 88 part-time entry. Drivers included Bubba Pollard, Carson Kvapil, Connor Mosack, Connor Zilisch, and team owner Dale Earnhardt Jr. At Watkins Glen, Overstreet helped Zilisch to his first career NASCAR win in his first career start.

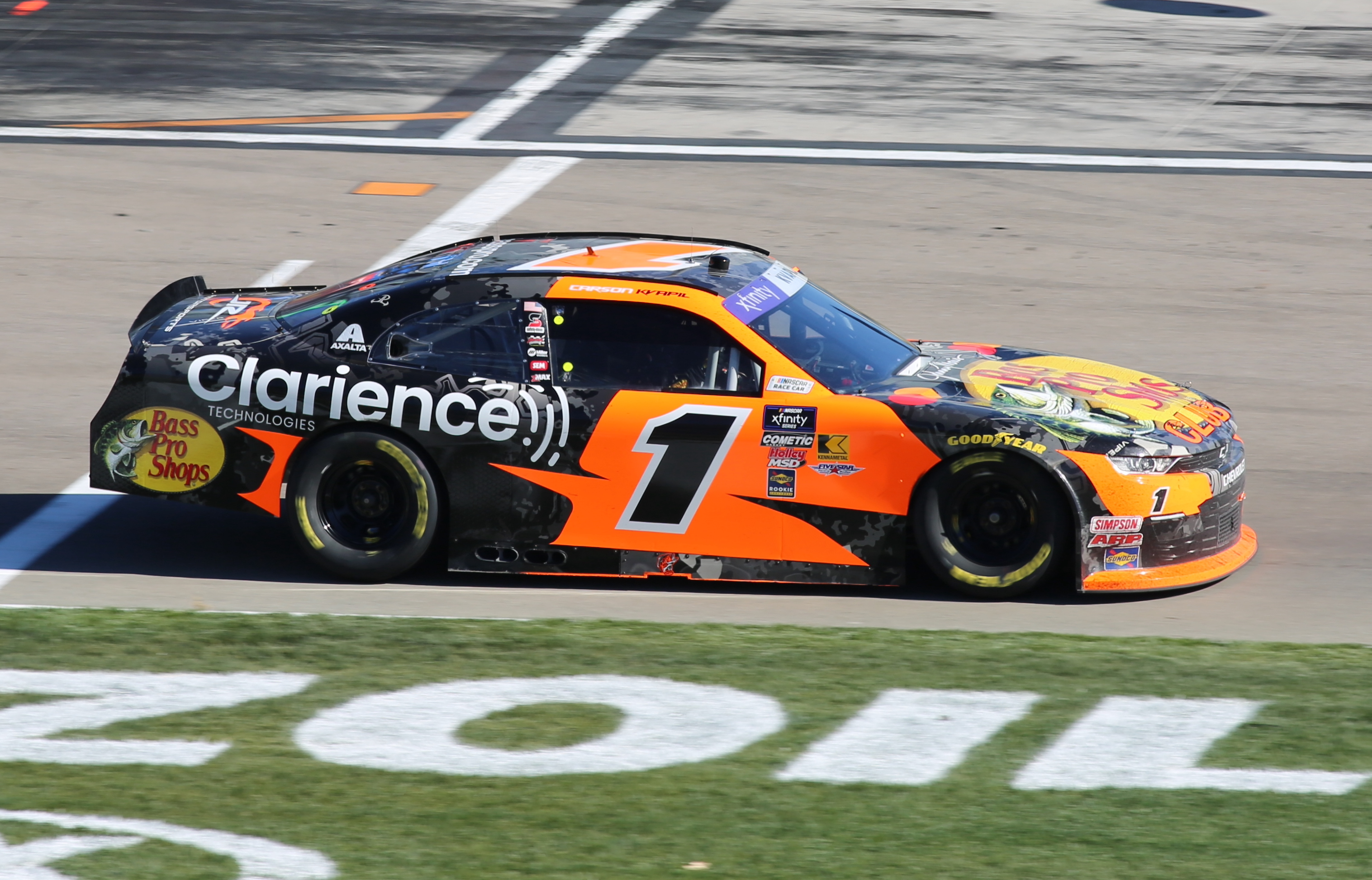
Kvapil's No. 1 car at Las Vegas Motor Speedway in 2025

On October 1, 2024, it was announced that Carson Kvapil and Overstreet would be paired up to run full-time for JRM in the Xfinity Series in 2025, driving the No. 1 Chevrolet.

In the O'Reilly Auto Parts Series, Overstreet moved to the JRM No. 7 team with Justin Allgaier driving the car. Allgaier won at Phoenix on Overstreet's birthday, Darlington, Martinsville, Nashville, Pocono and Atlanta II to become the regular season champion. Allgaier and Overstreet were consistent in "The Chase" to earn Overstreet his first series title.
