= 2026 Focused Health 250 =

The 2026 Focused Health 250 may refer to:

- 2026 Focused Health 250 (COTA), held at Circuit of the Americas on February 28, 2026
- 2026 Focused Health 250 (Atlanta), held at Atlanta Motor Speedway on July 11, 2026
