= 2026 National Debt Relief 250 =

NASCAR O'Reilly Auto Parts Series race at Martinsville Speedway

Race details
- Race 32 of 33 in the 2026 NASCAR O'Reilly Auto Parts Series
- Date: October 31, 2026
- Location: Martinsville Speedway in Ridgeway, Virginia
- Course: Permanent racing facility
- Course length: 0.526 miles (0.847 km)
- Distance: 250 laps, 131.5 mi (211.628 km)
- Average speed: 57.084 miles per hour (91.868 km/h)

Pole position
Driver	Carson Kvapil	JR Motorsports
- Time: 19.855

Most laps led
Driver	Carson Kvapil	JR Motorsports
- Laps: 121

Fastest lap
Driver	Carson Kvapil	JR Motorsports
- Time: 20.464

Winner
No. 1	Carson Kvapil	JR Motorsports

Television in the United States
- Network: The CW
- Announcers: Adam Alexander, Jamie McMurray, and Parker Kligerman

Radio in the United States
- Radio: MRN
- Booth announcers: Alex Hayden and Mike Bagley
- Turn announcers: Dave Moody (Backstretch)

The 2026 National Debt Relief 250 was a NASCAR O'Reilly Auto Parts Series race held on Saturday, October 31, 2026, at Martinsville Speedway in Ridgeway, Virginia. Contested over 250 laps on the 0.526 mile (0.847 km) paperclip-shaped short track, it was the 32nd race of the 2026 NASCAR O'Reilly Auto Parts Series season, the eighth race in the NASCAR Chase, and the seventh running of the event.

Carson Kvapil, driving for JR Motorsports, pulled off a much-needed dominant performance, leading a race-high 121 laps and holding off a charging Justin Allgaier in the final 20 laps to earn his third career NASCAR O'Reilly Auto Parts Series win, and his third of the season. Allgaier won the first stage, leading 52 laps, while Anthony Alfredo won the second stage, leading 17 laps. At race's end, Allgaier finished second, and Corey Day finished third. Brandon Jones and Sam Mayer rounded out the top five, while Sheldon Creed, Sammy Smith, William Sawalich, Brent Crews, and Taylor Gray rounded out the top ten.

Following the race, Mayer and Smith were mathematically eliminated from championship contention.

== Report ==
=== Background ===
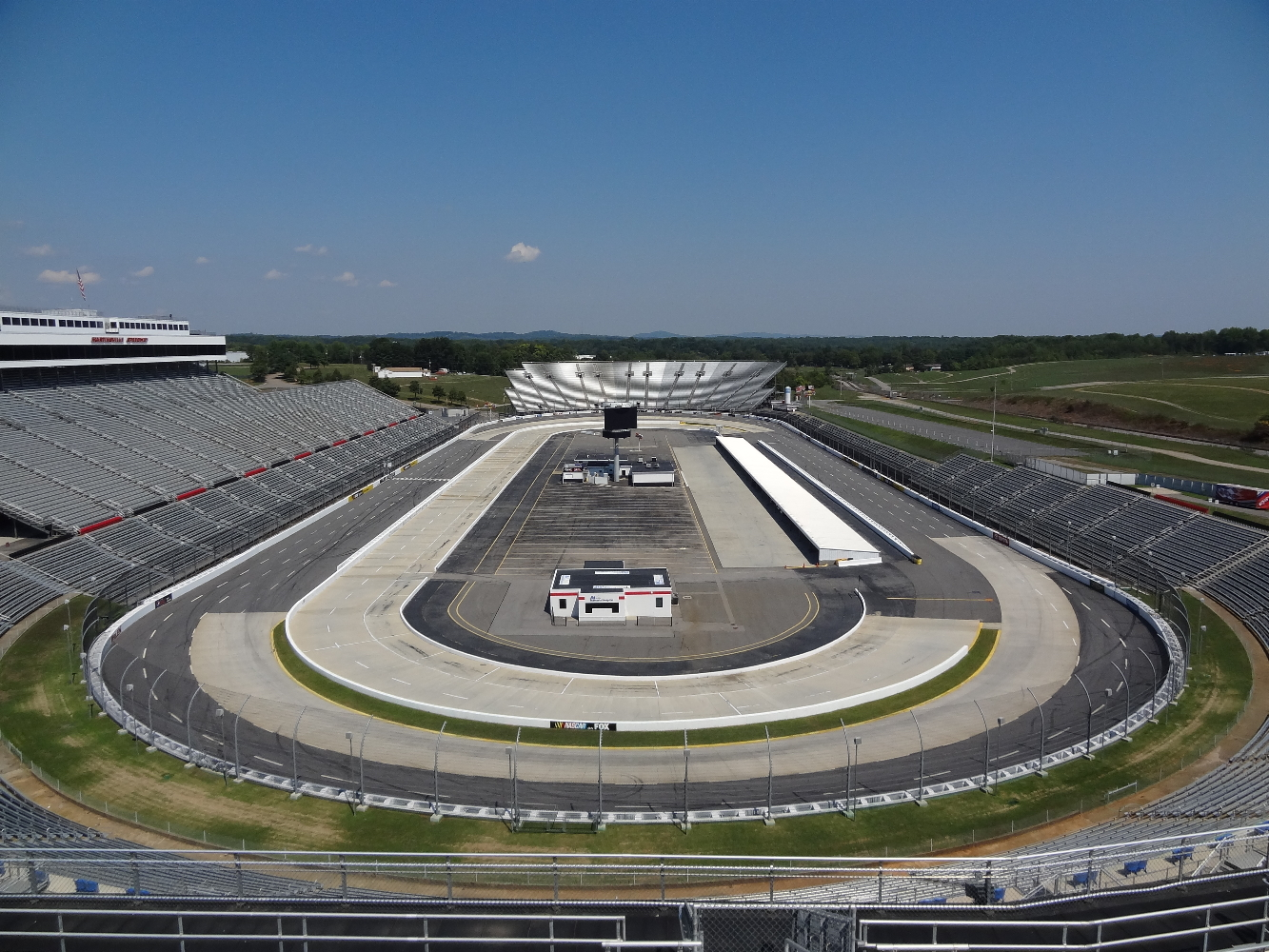
Martinsville Speedway, the track where the race was held.

Martinsville Speedway is an International Speedway Corporation-owned NASCAR stock car racing track located in Henry County, in Ridgeway, Virginia, just to the south of Martinsville. At 0.526 miles (0.847 km) in length, it is the shortest track in the NASCAR Cup Series. The track is also one of the first paved oval tracks in NASCAR, being built in 1947 by H. Clay Earles. It is also the only race track that has been on the NASCAR circuit from its beginning in 1948. Along with this, Martinsville is the only NASCAR oval track on the entire NASCAR track circuit to have asphalt surfaces on the straightaways, then concrete to cover the turns.

National Debt Relief returned as the title sponsor after a one year hiatus on October 13.

==== Entry list ====
- (R) denotes rookie driver.
- (i) denotes driver who is ineligible for series driver points.
- (CC) denotes chase contender.
- (OC) denotes owners' chase contender car.

#	Driver	Team	Make
00	Sheldon Creed (CC)	Haas Factory Team	Chevrolet
0	Garrett Smithley	SS-Green Light Racing	Chevrolet
1	Carson Kvapil (CC)	JR Motorsports	Chevrolet
02	Ryan Ellis	Young's Motorsports	Chevrolet
2	Jesse Love (CC)	Richard Childress Racing	Chevrolet
07	Josh Bilicki	SS-Green Light Racing	Chevrolet
7	Justin Allgaier (CC)	JR Motorsports	Chevrolet
8	Sammy Smith (CC)	JR Motorsports	Chevrolet
17	Corey Day (CC)	Hendrick Motorsports	Chevrolet
18	William Sawalich	Joe Gibbs Racing	Toyota
19	Brent Crews (OC) (R)	Joe Gibbs Racing	Toyota
20	Brandon Jones (CC)	Joe Gibbs Racing	Toyota
21	Austin Hill (CC)	Richard Childress Racing	Chevrolet
24	Harrison Burton	Sam Hunt Racing	Toyota
26	Dean Thompson	Sam Hunt Racing	Toyota
27	Jeb Burton	Jordan Anderson Racing	Chevrolet
28	Kyle Sieg	RSS Racing	Chevrolet
31	Blaine Perkins	Jordan Anderson Racing	Chevrolet
32	Daniel Dye (i)	Jordan Anderson Racing	Chevrolet
35	Justin Carroll (i)	Joey Gase Motorsports	Chevrolet
38	Patrick Emerling (i)	RSS Racing	Ford
39	Ryan Sieg	RSS Racing	Chevrolet
41	Sam Mayer (CC)	Haas Factory Team	Chevrolet
42	Baltazar Leguizamón	Young's Motorsports	Chevrolet
44	Brennan Poole	Alpha Prime Racing	Chevrolet
45	Lavar Scott (R)	Alpha Prime Racing	Chevrolet
47	Dawson Cram	Mike Harmon Racing	Chevrolet
48	Patrick Staropoli (R)	Big Machine Racing	Chevrolet
51	Jeremy Clements	Jeremy Clements Racing	Chevrolet
53	Carson Ware	Joey Gase Motorsports	Chevrolet
54	Taylor Gray (CC)	Joe Gibbs Racing	Toyota
55	Joey Gase	Joey Gase Motorsports	Ford
87	Lee Pulliam	Peterson Racing	Chevrolet
88	Rajah Caruth (CC)	JR Motorsports	Chevrolet
91	Mason Maggio	DGM Racing	Chevrolet
92	Alex Labbé	DGM Racing	Chevrolet
96	Anthony Alfredo	Viking Motorsports	Chevrolet
99	Parker Retzlaff (CC)	Viking Motorsports	Chevrolet
Official entry list

== Practice ==
The first and only practice session was held on Friday, October 30, at 3:00 PM EST, and lasted for 50 minutes.

Dean Thompson, driving for Sam Hunt Racing, set the fastest time in the session, with a lap of 20.550 seconds, and a speed of 92.146 miles per hour (148.295 km/h).

=== Practice results ===
Pos.	#	Driver	Team	Make	Time	Speed
1	26	Dean Thompson	Sam Hunt Racing	Toyota	20.550	92.146
2	41	Sam Mayer (CC)	Haas Factory Team	Chevrolet	20.554	92.128
3	54	Taylor Gray (CC)	Joe Gibbs Racing	Toyota	20.611	91.873
Full practice results

== Qualifying ==
Qualifying was held on Friday, October 30, at 4:05 PM EST. Since Martinsville Speedway is a short track, the qualifying procedure used was single-car, two-lap system with one round. Drivers were on track by themselves and will had two laps to post a qualifying time, and whoever set the fastest time won the pole.

Carson Kvapil, driving for JR Motorsports, qualified on pole position with a lap of 19.855 seconds, and a speed of 95.371 miles per hour (153.485 km/h).

No drivers failed to qualify.

=== Qualifying results ===
Pos.	#	Driver	Team	Make	Time	Speed
1	1	Carson Kvapil (CC)	JR Motorsports	Chevrolet	19.855	95.371
2	88	Rajah Caruth (CC)	JR Motorsports	Chevrolet	19.903	95.141
3	7	Justin Allgaier (CC)	JR Motorsports	Chevrolet	19.941	94.960
4	99	Parker Retzlaff (CC)	Viking Motorsports	Chevrolet	19.941	94.960
5	18	William Sawalich	Joe Gibbs Racing	Toyota	19.961	94.865
6	8	Sammy Smith (CC)	JR Motorsports	Chevrolet	20.017	94.600
7	00	Sheldon Creed (CC)	Haas Factory Team	Chevrolet	20.030	94.538
8	2	Jesse Love (CC)	Richard Childress Racing	Chevrolet	20.036	94.510
9	17	Corey Day (CC)	Hendrick Motorsports	Chevrolet	20.046	94.463
10	54	Taylor Gray (CC)	Joe Gibbs Racing	Toyota	20.055	94.420
11	96	Anthony Alfredo	Viking Motorsports	Chevrolet	20.061	94.392
12	20	Brandon Jones (CC)	Joe Gibbs Racing	Toyota	20.076	94.322
13	19	Brent Crews (OC) (R)	Joe Gibbs Racing	Toyota	20.121	94.111
14	41	Sam Mayer (CC)	Haas Factory Team	Chevrolet	20.122	94.106
15	26	Dean Thompson	Sam Hunt Racing	Toyota	20.150	93.975
16	31	Blaine Perkins	Jordan Anderson Racing	Chevrolet	20.212	93.687
17	24	Harrison Burton	Sam Hunt Racing	Toyota	20.232	93.594
18	27	Jeb Burton	Jordan Anderson Racing	Chevrolet	20.233	93.590
19	39	Ryan Sieg	RSS Racing	Chevrolet	20.253	93.497
20	51	Jeremy Clements	Jeremy Clements Racing	Chevrolet	20.253	93.497
21	21	Austin Hill (CC)	Richard Childress Racing	Chevrolet	20.275	93.396
22	28	Kyle Sieg	RSS Racing	Chevrolet	20.351	93.047
23	92	Alex Labbé	DGM Racing	Chevrolet	20.356	93.024
24	38	Patrick Emerling (i)	RSS Racing	Ford	20.426	92.705
25	44	Brennan Poole	Alpha Prime Racing	Chevrolet	20.441	92.637
26	48	Patrick Staropoli (R)	Big Machine Racing	Chevrolet	20.441	92.637
27	53	Carson Ware	Joey Gase Motorsports	Chevrolet	20.445	92.619
28	47	Dawson Cram	Mike Harmon Racing	Chevrolet	20.448	92.606
29	02	Ryan Ellis	Young's Motorsports	Chevrolet	20.457	92.565
30	35	Justin Carroll (i)	Joey Gase Motorsports	Chevrolet	20.460	92.551
31	91	Mason Maggio	DGM Racing	Chevrolet	20.469	92.511
32	45	Lavar Scott (R)	Alpha Prime Racing	Chevrolet	20.497	92.384
Qualified by owner's points
33	55	Joey Gase	Joey Gase Motorsports	Ford	20.513	92.312
34	32	Daniel Dye (i)	Jordan Anderson Racing	Chevrolet	20.521	92.276
35	0	Garrett Smithley	SS-Green Light Racing	Chevrolet	20.641	91.740
36	07	Josh Bilicki	SS-Green Light Racing	Chevrolet	20.673	91.598
37	87	Lee Pulliam	Peterson Racing	Chevrolet	20.752	91.249
38	42	Baltazar Leguizamón	Young's Motorsports	Chevrolet	21.102	89.736
Official qualifying results
Official starting lineup

== Race ==
=== Race results ===
==== Stage Results ====
Stage One Laps: 60

Pos.	#	Driver	Team	Make	Pts
1	7	Justin Allgaier (CC)	JR Motorsports	Chevrolet	10
2	00	Sheldon Creed (CC)	Haas Factory Team	Chevrolet	9
3	20	Brandon Jones (CC)	Joe Gibbs Racing	Toyota	8
4	1	Carson Kvapil (CC)	JR Motorsports	Chevrolet	7
5	2	Jesse Love (CC)	Richard Childress Racing	Chevrolet	6
6	27	Jeb Burton	Jordan Anderson Racing	Chevrolet	5
7	99	Parker Retzlaff (CC)	Viking Motorsports	Chevrolet	4
8	96	Anthony Alfredo	Viking Motorsports	Chevrolet	3
9	41	Sam Mayer (CC)	Haas Factory Team	Chevrolet	2
10	18	William Sawalich	Joe Gibbs Racing	Toyota	1

Stage Two Laps: 60

Pos.	#	Driver	Team	Make	Pts
1	96	Anthony Alfredo	Viking Motorsports	Chevrolet	10
2	7	Justin Allgaier (CC)	JR Motorsports	Chevrolet	9
3	19	Brent Crews (OC) (R)	Joe Gibbs Racing	Toyota	8
4	17	Corey Day (CC)	Hendrick Motorsports	Chevrolet	7
5	8	Sammy Smith (CC)	JR Motorsports	Chevrolet	6
6	18	William Sawalich	Joe Gibbs Racing	Toyota	5
7	54	Taylor Gray (CC)	Joe Gibbs Racing	Toyota	4
8	00	Sheldon Creed (CC)	Haas Factory Team	Chevrolet	3
9	44	Brennan Poole	Alpha Prime Racing	Chevrolet	2
10	88	Rajah Caruth (CC)	JR Motorsports	Chevrolet	1

=== Final Stage Results ===
Stage Three Laps: 130

Fin	St	#	Driver	Team	Make	Laps	Led	Status	Pts
1	1	1	Carson Kvapil (CC)	JR Motorsports	Chevrolet	250	121	Running	63
2	3	7	Justin Allgaier (CC)	JR Motorsports	Chevrolet	250	52	Running	54
3	9	17	Corey Day (CC)	Hendrick Motorsports	Chevrolet	250	24	Running	41
4	12	20	Brandon Jones (CC)	Joe Gibbs Racing	Toyota	250	0	Running	41
5	14	41	Sam Mayer (CC)	Haas Factory Team	Chevrolet	250	36	Running	34
6	7	00	Sheldon Creed (CC)	Haas Factory Team	Chevrolet	250	0	Running	43
7	6	8	Sammy Smith (CC)	JR Motorsports	Chevrolet	250	0	Running	36
8	5	18	William Sawalich	Joe Gibbs Racing	Toyota	250	0	Running	35
9	13	19	Brent Crews (OC) (R)	Joe Gibbs Racing	Toyota	250	0	Running	36
10	10	54	Taylor Gray (CC)	Joe Gibbs Racing	Toyota	250	0	Running	31
11	19	39	Ryan Sieg	RSS Racing	Chevrolet	250	0	Running	26
12	17	24	Harrison Burton	Sam Hunt Racing	Toyota	250	0	Running	25
13	18	27	Jeb Burton	Jordan Anderson Racing	Chevrolet	250	0	Running	29
14	37	87	Lee Pulliam	Peterson Racing	Chevrolet	250	0	Running	23
15	4	99	Parker Retzlaff (CC)	Viking Motorsports	Chevrolet	250	0	Running	26
16	2	88	Rajah Caruth (CC)	JR Motorsports	Chevrolet	250	0	Running	22
17	11	96	Anthony Alfredo	Viking Motorsports	Chevrolet	250	17	Running	33
18	32	45	Lavar Scott (R)	Alpha Prime Racing	Chevrolet	250	0	Running	19
19	26	48	Patrick Staropoli (R)	Big Machine Racing	Chevrolet	250	0	Running	18
20	25	44	Brennan Poole	Alpha Prime Racing	Chevrolet	250	0	Running	19
21	22	28	Kyle Sieg	RSS Racing	Chevrolet	250	0	Running	16
22	23	92	Alex Labbé	DGM Racing	Chevrolet	250	0	Running	15
23	27	53	Carson Ware	Joey Gase Motorsports	Chevrolet	250	0	Running	14
24	36	07	Josh Bilicki	SS-Green Light Racing	Chevrolet	250	0	Running	13
25	33	55	Joey Gase	Joey Gase Motorsports	Ford	250	0	Running	12
26	30	35	Justin Carroll (i)	Joey Gase Motorsports	Chevrolet	250	0	Running	0
27	38	42	Baltazar Leguizamón	Young's Motorsports	Chevrolet	250	0	Running	10
28	28	47	Dawson Cram	Mike Harmon Racing	Chevrolet	250	0	Running	9
29	20	51	Jeremy Clements	Jeremy Clements Racing	Chevrolet	244	0	Running	8
30	8	2	Jesse Love (CC)	Richard Childress Racing	Chevrolet	241	0	Running	13
31	21	21	Austin Hill (CC)	Richard Childress Racing	Chevrolet	241	0	Running	6
32	15	26	Dean Thompson	Sam Hunt Racing	Toyota	235	0	Running	5
33	16	31	Blaine Perkins	Jordan Anderson Racing	Chevrolet	223	0	Oil Leak	4
34	34	32	Daniel Dye (i)	Jordan Anderson Racing	Chevrolet	174	0	Accident	0
35	35	0	Garrett Smithley	SS-Green Light Racing	Chevrolet	161	0	Accident	2
36	31	91	Mason Maggio	DGM Racing	Chevrolet	161	0	Accident	1
37	24	38	Patrick Emerling (i)	RSS Racing	Ford	161	0	Accident	0
38	29	02	Ryan Ellis	Young's Motorsports	Chevrolet	60	0	Water Pump	1
Official race results

=== Race statistics ===
- Lead changes: 9 among 5 different drivers
- Cautions/Laps: 12 for 90 laps
- Red flags: 1
- Time of race: 2 hours, 18 minutes and 13 seconds
- Average speed: 57.084 miles per hour (91.868 km/h)

== Standings after the race ==
Drivers' Championship standings

	Pos	Driver	Points
1	1	Justin Allgaier	2,436
1	2	Jesse Love	2,414 (–22)
	3	Corey Day	2,413 (–23)
1	4	Carson Kvapil	2,405 (–31)
1	5	Sheldon Creed	2,394 (–42)
	6	Sam Mayer	2,339 (–97)
	7	Sammy Smith	2,329 (–107)
	8	Taylor Gray	2,277 (–159)
1	9	Brandon Jones	2,253 (–183)
1	10	Austin Hill	2,239 (–197)
	11	Parker Retzlaff	2,226 (–210)
	12	Rajah Caruth	2,205 (–231)
Official driver's standings

Manufacturers' Championship standings

Pos	Manufacturer	Points
1	Chevrolet	1,699
2	Toyota	1,088 (–611)
3	Ford	293 (–1,406)

- Note: Only the first 12 positions are included for the driver standings.

Previous race: 2026 TPG 250	NASCAR O'Reilly Auto Parts Series; 2026 season	Next race: 2026 O'Reilly Auto Parts 300
