= 2026 Pennzoil 250 =

NASCAR O'Reilly Auto Parts Series race at Indianapolis Motor Speedway

2026 Pennzoil 250 presented by Take 5 Oil Change
Race details
- Race 22 of 33 in the 2026 NASCAR O'Reilly Auto Parts Series
- Date: July 25, 2026
- Location: Indianapolis Motor Speedway in Speedway, Indiana
- Course: Permanent racing facility
- Course length: 2.5 miles (4 km)
- Distance: 100 laps, 250 mi (402.336 km)
- Average speed: 128.940 miles per hour (207.509 km/h)

Pole position
Driver	Sheldon Creed	Haas Factory Team
- Time: 53.069

Most laps led
Driver	Ross Chastain	JR Motorsports
- Laps: 31

Fastest lap
Driver	Justin Allgaier	JR Motorsports
- Time: 53.935

Winner
No. 1	Carson Kvapil	JR Motorsports

Television in the United States
- Network: The CW
- Announcers: Adam Alexander, Jamie McMurray, and Bubba Wallace
- Nielsen ratings: 1.25 million

Radio in the United States
- Radio: IMS Radio
- Booth announcers: Brad Gillie, Nick Yeoman, and Christopher Bell
- Turn announcers: Mark Jaynes (Turn 1), Michael Young (Turn 2), Jake Query (Turn 3), and Chris Wilner (Turn 4)

The 2026 Pennzoil 250 presented by Take 5 Oil Change was a NASCAR O'Reilly Auto Parts Series race held on Saturday, July 25, 2026, at Indianapolis Motor Speedway in Speedway, Indiana. Contested over 100 laps on the 2.5-mile (4.0 km) oval, it was the 22nd race of the 2026 NASCAR O'Reilly Auto Parts Series season, and the 15th running of the event.

Carson Kvapil, driving for JR Motorsports, took the lead from teammate Ross Chastain on lap 78, and led the remaining laps while holding off a charging Justin Allgaier in the final moments to earn his first career NASCAR O'Reilly Auto Parts Series win. Jeremy Clements won the first stage, leading nine laps, while Rajah Caruth won the second stage, leading six laps. At race's end, Allgaier finished second, and Chastain, who led the race-high 31 laps, finished third. Chase Elliott and William Sawalich rounded out the top five, while Brent Crews, Corey Day, Sheldon Creed, Brandon Jones, and Austin Hill rounded out the top ten.

Following the race, Kvapil, Creed, Day, Jones, and Hill clinched a spot in The Chase.

== Report ==
=== Background ===
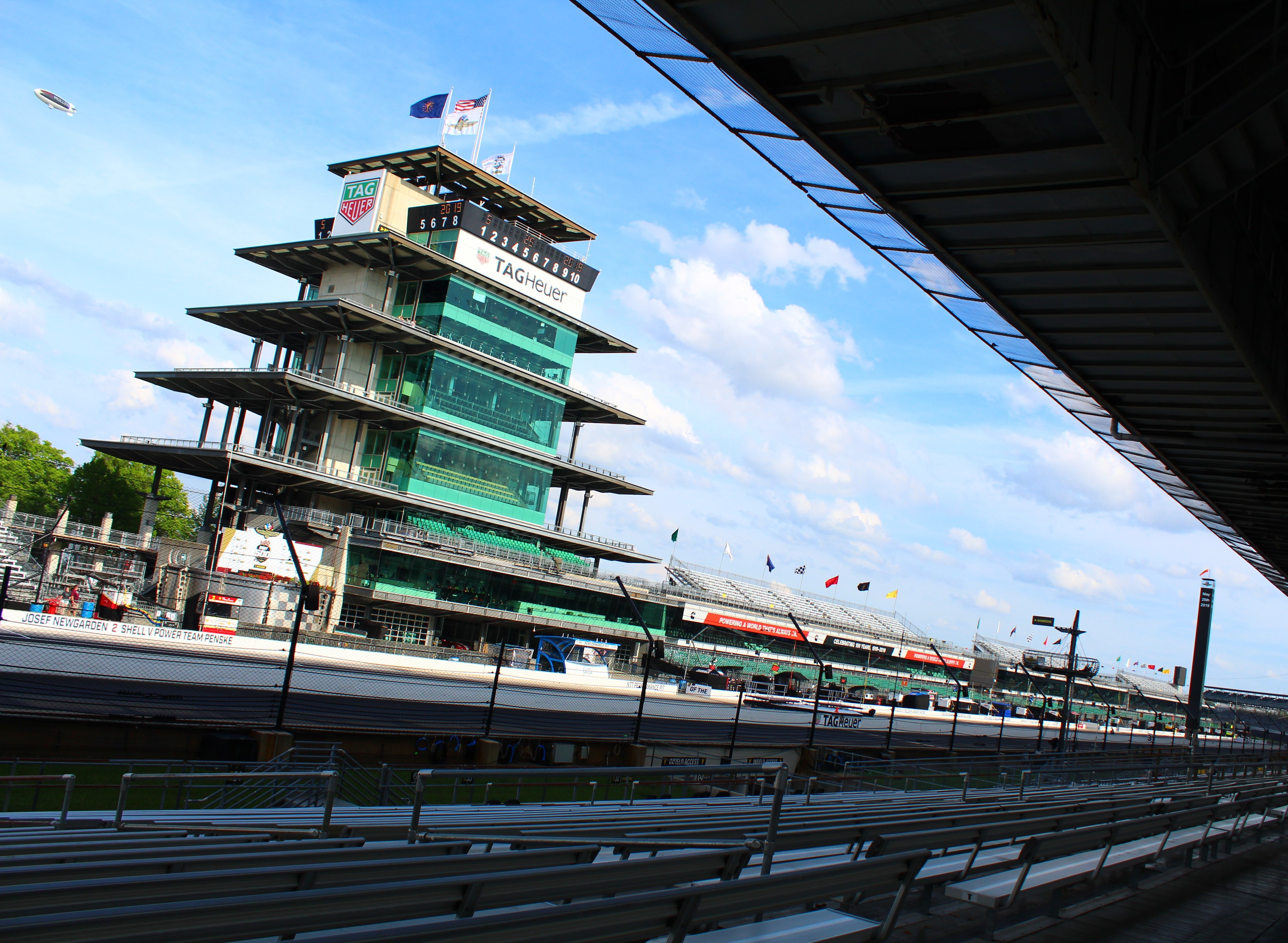
The Pagoda, the control tower, which houses officials, broadcasting, and hospitality suites, is an icon at the Indianapolis Motor Speedway.

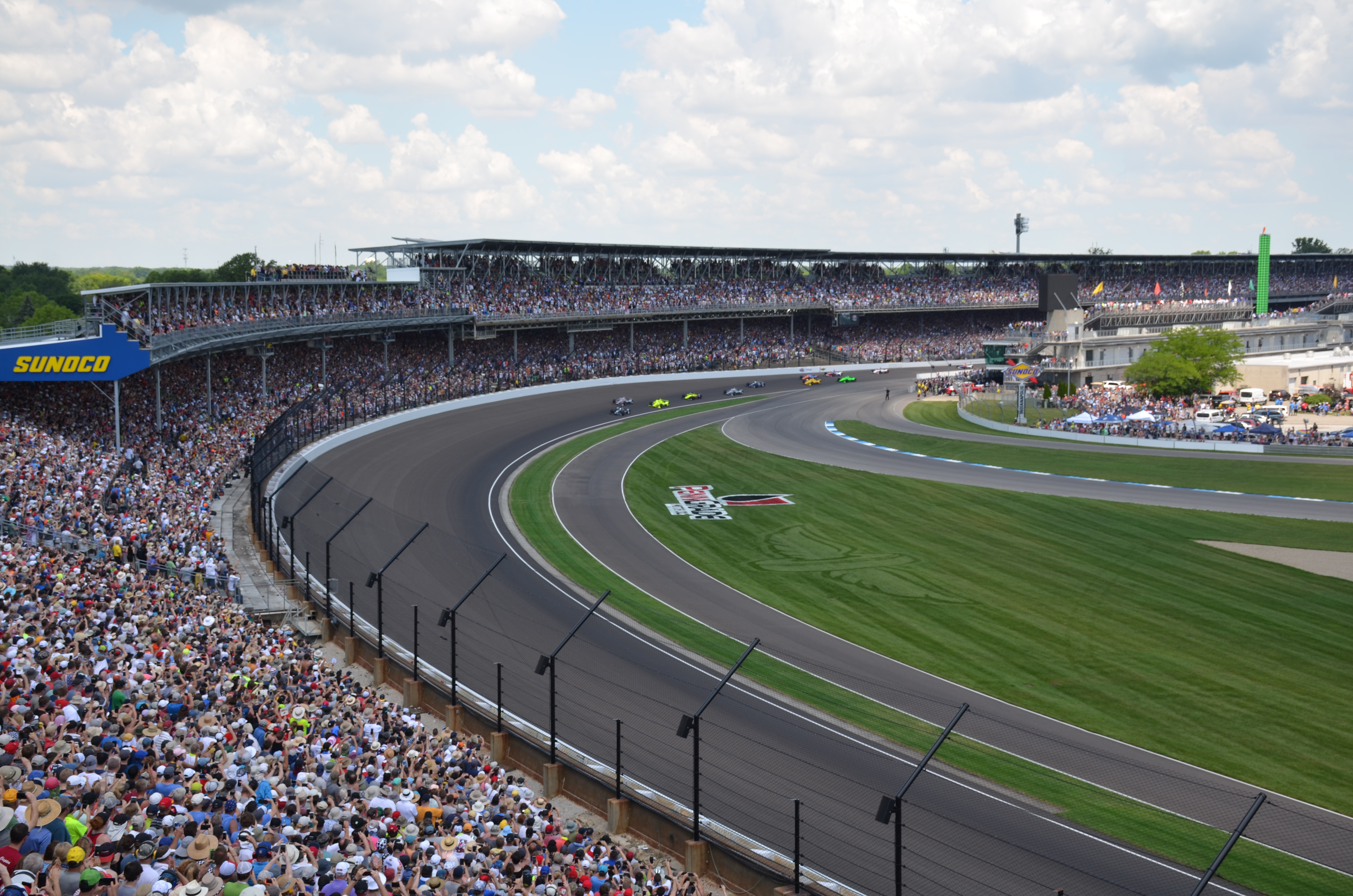
Turn one at the Indianapolis Motor Speedway.

The Indianapolis Motor Speedway, located in Speedway, Indiana, (an enclave suburb of Indianapolis) in the United States, is the home of the Indianapolis 500 of IndyCar Series and the Brickyard 400 of the NASCAR Cup Series. It is located on the corner of 16th Street and Georgetown Road, approximately six miles (10 km) west of Downtown Indianapolis.

Constructed in 1909, it is the original speedway, the first racing facility so named. It has a permanent seating capacity estimated at 235,000 with infield seating raising capacity to an approximate 400,000. It is the highest-capacity sports venue in the world.

Considered relatively flat by American standards, the track is a 2.5-mile (4.0 km), nearly rectangular oval with dimensions that have remained essentially unchanged since its inception: four 0.25-mile (0.40 km) turns, two 0.625-mile-long (1.006 km) straightaways between the fourth and first turns and the second and third turns, and two .125-mile (0.201 km) short straightaways – termed "short chutes" – between the first and second, and third and fourth turns.

The track also held races on its infield road course, formerly the Verizon 200 at the Brickyard, from 2021 to 2023 in the Cup Series, the Pennzoil 150, in the Xfinity Series, and currently the Sonsio Grand Prix in IndyCar.

==== Entry list ====
- (R) denotes rookie driver.
- (i) denotes driver who is ineligible for series driver points.

#	Driver	Team	Make
00	Sheldon Creed	Haas Factory Team	Chevrolet
0	Garrett Smithley	SS-Green Light Racing	Chevrolet
1	Carson Kvapil	JR Motorsports	Chevrolet
02	Ryan Ellis	Young's Motorsports	Chevrolet
2	Jesse Love	Richard Childress Racing	Chevrolet
7	Justin Allgaier	JR Motorsports	Chevrolet
8	Sammy Smith	JR Motorsports	Chevrolet
9	Ross Chastain (i)	JR Motorsports	Chevrolet
17	Corey Day	Hendrick Motorsports	Chevrolet
18	William Sawalich	Joe Gibbs Racing	Toyota
19	Brent Crews (R)	Joe Gibbs Racing	Toyota
20	Brandon Jones	Joe Gibbs Racing	Toyota
21	Austin Hill	Richard Childress Racing	Chevrolet
24	Harrison Burton	Sam Hunt Racing	Toyota
26	Dean Thompson	Sam Hunt Racing	Toyota
27	Jeb Burton	Jordan Anderson Racing	Chevrolet
28	Kyle Sieg	RSS Racing	Chevrolet
31	Blaine Perkins	Jordan Anderson Racing	Chevrolet
32	Rajah Caruth	Jordan Anderson Racing	Chevrolet
38	J. J. Yeley	RSS Racing	Ford
39	Ryan Sieg	RSS Racing	Chevrolet
41	Sam Mayer	Haas Factory Team	Chevrolet
42	Nathan Byrd	Young's Motorsports	Chevrolet
44	Brennan Poole	Alpha Prime Racing	Chevrolet
45	Lavar Scott (R)	Alpha Prime Racing	Chevrolet
47	David Starr	Mike Harmon Racing	Chevrolet
48	Patrick Staropoli (R)	Big Machine Racing	Chevrolet
51	Jeremy Clements	Jeremy Clements Racing	Chevrolet
53	Blake Lothian	Joey Gase Motorsports	Chevrolet
54	Taylor Gray	Joe Gibbs Racing	Toyota
55	Joey Gase	Joey Gase Motorsports	Chevrolet
87	Nick Sanchez	Peterson Racing	Chevrolet
88	Chase Elliott (i)	JR Motorsports	Chevrolet
91	Mason Maggio	DGM Racing	Chevrolet
92	Preston Pardus	DGM Racing	Chevrolet
96	Anthony Alfredo	Viking Motorsports	Chevrolet
99	Parker Retzlaff	Viking Motorsports	Chevrolet
Official entry list

== Practice ==
The first and only practice session was held on Friday, July 24, at 12:00 PM EST, and lasted for 50 minutes.

Ross Chastain, driving for JR Motorsports, set the fastest time in the session, with a lap of 53.517 seconds, and a speed of 168.171 miles per hour (270.645 km/h).

=== Practice results ===
Pos.	#	Driver	Team	Make	Time	Speed
1	9	Ross Chastain (i)	JR Motorsports	Chevrolet	53.517	168.171
2	7	Justin Allgaier	JR Motorsports	Chevrolet	53.621	167.845
3	1	Carson Kvapil	JR Motorsports	Chevrolet	53.691	167.626
Full practice results

== Qualifying ==
Qualifying was on Saturday, July 25, at 12:00 PM EST. Standard intermediate track qualifying was in effect, although at Indianapolis, a hybrid road course qualifying rule was used. The timing line was set in Turn 3, where cars exited pit road, drove two-thirds of a lap, then took the green flag in the north chute exiting Turn 3, and completed their lap there the next time by. Teams then immediately pitted the car, meaning only two laps were run. In addition, up to two cars could be at the track at one time, separated by considerable intervals (about 20 seconds) to ensure drafting was prohibited.

Sheldon Creed, driving for Haas Factory Team, qualified on pole position with a lap of 53.069 seconds, and a speed of 169.591 miles per hour (272.930 km/h).

No drivers failed to qualify.

=== Qualifying results ===
Pos.	#	Driver	Team	Make	Time	Speed
1	00	Sheldon Creed	Haas Factory Team	Chevrolet	53.069	169.591
2	1	Carson Kvapil	JR Motorsports	Chevrolet	53.098	169.498
3	41	Sam Mayer	Haas Factory Team	Chevrolet	53.177	169.246
4	51	Jeremy Clements	Jeremy Clements Racing	Chevrolet	53.321	168.789
5	54	Taylor Gray	Joe Gibbs Racing	Toyota	53.349	168.700
6	20	Brandon Jones	Joe Gibbs Racing	Toyota	53.375	168.618
7	88	Chase Elliott (i)	JR Motorsports	Chevrolet	53.410	168.508
8	9	Ross Chastain (i)	JR Motorsports	Chevrolet	53.424	168.464
9	18	William Sawalich	Joe Gibbs Racing	Toyota	53.429	168.448
10	8	Sammy Smith	JR Motorsports	Chevrolet	53.498	168.231
11	17	Corey Day	Hendrick Motorsports	Chevrolet	53.506	168.205
12	27	Jeb Burton	Jordan Anderson Racing	Chevrolet	53.509	168.196
13	7	Justin Allgaier	JR Motorsports	Chevrolet	53.511	168.190
14	39	Ryan Sieg	RSS Racing	Chevrolet	53.527	168.139
15	19	Brent Crews (R)	Joe Gibbs Racing	Toyota	53.549	168.070
16	32	Rajah Caruth	Jordan Anderson Racing	Chevrolet	53.662	167.716
17	99	Parker Retzlaff	Viking Motorsports	Chevrolet	53.681	167.657
18	48	Patrick Staropoli (R)	Big Machine Racing	Chevrolet	53.819	167.227
19	21	Austin Hill	Richard Childress Racing	Chevrolet	53.851	167.128
20	96	Anthony Alfredo	Viking Motorsports	Chevrolet	53.860	167.100
21	91	Mason Maggio	DGM Racing	Chevrolet	53.876	167.050
22	28	Kyle Sieg	RSS Racing	Chevrolet	54.003	166.657
23	87	Nick Sanchez	Peterson Racing	Chevrolet	54.022	166.599
24	24	Harrison Burton	Sam Hunt Racing	Toyota	54.073	166.442
25	26	Dean Thompson	Sam Hunt Racing	Toyota	54.084	166.408
26	2	Jesse Love	Richard Childress Racing	Chevrolet	54.127	166.276
27	31	Blaine Perkins	Jordan Anderson Racing	Chevrolet	54.157	166.184
28	44	Brennan Poole	Alpha Prime Racing	Chevrolet	54.296	165.758
29	92	Preston Pardus	DGM Racing	Chevrolet	54.355	165.578
30	0	Garrett Smithley	SS-Green Light Racing	Chevrolet	54.470	165.229
31	45	Lavar Scott (R)	Alpha Prime Racing	Chevrolet	54.525	165.062
32	07	Josh Bilicki	SS-Green Light Racing	Chevrolet	54.746	164.396
Qualified by owner's points
33	02	Ryan Ellis	Young's Motorsports	Chevrolet	55.157	163.171
34	38	J. J. Yeley	RSS Racing	Ford	55.237	162.934
35	55	Joey Gase	Joey Gase Motorsports	Chevrolet	56.160	160.256
36	42	Nathan Byrd	Young's Motorsports	Chevrolet	56.241	160.026
37	53	Blake Lothian	Joey Gase Motorsports	Chevrolet	56.379	159.634
38	47	David Starr	Mike Harmon Racing	Chevrolet	58.652	153.447
Official qualifying results
Official starting lineup

== Race ==
=== Race results ===
==== Stage Results ====
Stage One Laps: 30

Pos.	#	Driver	Team	Make	Pts
1	51	Jeremy Clements	Jeremy Clements Racing	Chevrolet	10
2	9	Ross Chastain (i)	JR Motorsports	Chevrolet	0
3	1	Carson Kvapil	JR Motorsports	Chevrolet	8
4	18	William Sawalich	Joe Gibbs Racing	Toyota	7
5	41	Sam Mayer	Haas Factory Team	Chevrolet	6
6	7	Justin Allgaier	JR Motorsports	Chevrolet	5
7	00	Sheldon Creed	Haas Factory Team	Chevrolet	4
8	54	Taylor Gray	Joe Gibbs Racing	Toyota	3
9	19	Brent Crews (R)	Joe Gibbs Racing	Toyota	2
10	8	Sammy Smith	JR Motorsports	Chevrolet	1

Stage Two Laps: 30

Pos.	#	Driver	Team	Make	Pts
1	32	Rajah Caruth	Jordan Anderson Racing	Chevrolet	10
2	7	Justin Allgaier	JR Motorsports	Chevrolet	9
3	9	Ross Chastain (i)	JR Motorsports	Chevrolet	0
4	00	Sheldon Creed	Haas Factory Team	Chevrolet	7
5	1	Carson Kvapil	JR Motorsports	Chevrolet	6
6	26	Dean Thompson	Sam Hunt Racing	Toyota	5
7	41	Sam Mayer	Haas Factory Team	Chevrolet	4
8	18	William Sawalich	Joe Gibbs Racing	Toyota	3
9	21	Austin Hill	Richard Childress Racing	Chevrolet	2
10	88	Chase Elliott (i)	JR Motorsports	Chevrolet	0

=== Final Stage Results ===
Stage Three Laps: 40

Fin	St	#	Driver	Team	Make	Laps	Led	Status	Pts
1	2	1	Carson Kvapil	JR Motorsports	Chevrolet	100	23	Running	69
2	13	7	Justin Allgaier	JR Motorsports	Chevrolet	100	4	Running	49
3	8	9	Ross Chastain (i)	JR Motorsports	Chevrolet	100	31	Running	0
4	7	88	Chase Elliott (i)	JR Motorsports	Chevrolet	100	0	Running	0
5	9	18	William Sawalich	Joe Gibbs Racing	Toyota	100	2	Running	42
6	15	19	Brent Crews (R)	Joe Gibbs Racing	Toyota	100	0	Running	33
7	11	17	Corey Day	Hendrick Motorsports	Chevrolet	100	0	Running	30
8	1	00	Sheldon Creed	Haas Factory Team	Chevrolet	100	23	Running	40
9	6	20	Brandon Jones	Joe Gibbs Racing	Toyota	100	0	Running	28
10	19	21	Austin Hill	Richard Childress Racing	Chevrolet	100	0	Running	29
11	17	99	Parker Retzlaff	Viking Motorsports	Chevrolet	100	0	Running	26
12	5	54	Taylor Gray	Joe Gibbs Racing	Toyota	100	0	Running	28
13	3	41	Sam Mayer	Haas Factory Team	Chevrolet	100	0	Running	34
14	20	96	Anthony Alfredo	Viking Motorsports	Chevrolet	100	0	Running	23
15	12	27	Jeb Burton	Jordan Anderson Racing	Chevrolet	100	0	Running	22
16	26	2	Jesse Love	Richard Childress Racing	Chevrolet	100	0	Running	21
17	14	39	Ryan Sieg	RSS Racing	Chevrolet	100	0	Running	20
18	24	24	Harrison Burton	Sam Hunt Racing	Toyota	100	0	Running	19
19	10	8	Sammy Smith	JR Motorsports	Chevrolet	100	0	Running	19
20	23	87	Nick Sanchez	Peterson Racing	Chevrolet	100	0	Rnning	17
21	25	26	Dean Thompson	Sam Hunt Racing	Toyota	100	2	Running	21
22	16	32	Rajah Caruth	Jordan Anderson Racing	Chevrolet	100	6	Running	25
23	18	48	Patrick Staropoli (R)	Big Machine Racing	Chevrolet	100	0	Running	14
24	22	28	Kyle Sieg	RSS Racing	Chevrolet	100	0	Running	13
25	30	0	Garrett Smithley	SS-Green Light Racing	Chevrolet	100	0	Running	12
26	21	91	Mason Maggio	DGM Racing	Chevrolet	100	0	Running	11
27	31	45	Lavar Scott (R)	Alpha Prime Racing	Chevrolet	100	0	Running	10
28	27	31	Blaine Perkins	Jordan Anderson Racing	Chevrolet	100	0	Running	9
29	28	44	Brennan Poole	Alpha Prime Racing	Chevrolet	100	0	Running	8
30	29	92	Preston Pardus	DGM Racing	Chevrolet	100	0	Running	7
31	36	42	Nathan Byrd	Young's Motorsports	Chevrolet	100	0	Running	6
32	33	02	Ryan Ellis	Young's Motorsports	Chevrolet	99	0	Running	5
33	32	07	Josh Bilicki	SS-Green Light Racing	Chevrolet	99	0	Running	4
34	37	53	Blake Lothian	Joey Gase Motorsports	Chevrolet	99	0	Running	3
35	38	47	David Starr	Mike Harmon Racing	Chevrolet	99	0	Running	2
36	35	55	Joey Gase	Joey Gase Motorsports	Chevrolet	99	0	Running	1
37	4	51	Jeremy Clements	Jeremy Clements Racing	Chevrolet	97	9	Running	11
38	34	38	J. J. Yeley	RSS Racing	Ford	39	0	Fuel Pump	1
Official race results

=== Race statistics ===
- Lead changes: 10 among 8 different drivers
- Cautions/Laps: 3 for 13 laps
- Red flags: 0
- Time of race: 1 hour, 56 minutes and 20 seconds
- Average speed: 128.940 miles per hour (207.509 km/h)

== Standings after the race ==
Drivers' Championship standings

	Pos	Driver	Points
	1	Justin Allgaier	1,016
3	2	Carson Kvapil	751 (–265)
1	3	Jesse Love	747 (–269)
1	4	Sheldon Creed	733 (–283)
1	5	Corey Day	719 (–297)
	6	Brandon Jones	692 (–324)
	7	Austin Hill	688 (–328)
	8	Sammy Smith	658 (–358)
	9	Parker Retzlaff	619 (–397)
	10	Sam Mayer	589 (–427)
	11	Brent Crews	573 (–443)
	12	Taylor Gray	567 (–449)
Official driver's standings

Manufacturers' Championship standings

Pos	Manufacturer	Points
1	Chevrolet	1,149
2	Toyota	763 (–386)
3	Ford	193 (–956)

- Note: Only the first 12 positions are included for the driver standings.

Previous race: 2026 Focused Health 250 (Atlanta)	NASCAR O'Reilly Auto Parts Series; 2026 season	Next race: 2026 Hy-Vee PERKS 250
