= 2026 TPG 250 =

NASCAR O'Reilly Auto Parts Series race at Talladega Superspeedway

Race details
- Race 31 of 33 in the 2026 NASCAR O'Reilly Auto Parts Series
- Date: October 24, 2026
- Location: Talladega Superspeedway in Lincoln, Alabama
- Course: Permanent racing facility
- Course length: 2.66 miles (4.28 km)
- Distance: 94 laps, 250.04 mi (402.40 km)
- Average speed: 139.557 miles per hour (224.595 km/h)

Pole position
Driver	Jesse Love	Richard Childress Racing
- Time: 52.435

Most laps led
Driver	Carson Kvapil	JR Motorsports
- Laps: 67

Fastest lap
Driver	Brennan Poole	Alpha Prime Racing
- Time: 49.632

Winner
No. 8	Sammy Smith	JR Motorsports

Television in the United States
- Network: The CW
- Announcers: Adam Alexander, Jamie McMurray, and Parker Kligerman

Radio in the United States
- Radio: MRN
- Booth announcers: Alex Hayden, Mike Bagley, and Todd Gordon
- Turn announcers: Dave Moody (1 & 2), Tim Catalfamo (Backstretch), and Dan Hubbard (3 & 4)

The 2026 TPG 250 (also known as The Progress Group 250) was NASCAR O'Reilly Auto Parts Series race held on Saturday, October 24, 2026, at Talladega Superspeedway in Lincoln, Alabama. Contested over 94 laps on the 2.66 mile (4.28 km) superspeedway, it was the 31st race of the 2026 NASCAR O'Reilly Auto Parts Series season, the seventh race in the NASCAR Chase, and the 6th running of the event.

Sammy Smith, driving for JR Motorsports, made a last-lap pass on teammate Carson Kvapil, and with the push from Jesse Love, he was able to prevail at the line to earn his fourth career NASCAR O'Reilly Auto Parts Series win, and his first of the season. He would also sweep both Friday and Saturday races at Talladega, doing so by winning the Truck Series race in the previous day. Kvapil won the first stage, leading a race-high 67 laps, while Justin Allgaier won the second stage, leading 11 laps. At race's end, Kvapil finished second, and Love finished third. Allgaier and Sheldon Creed rounded out the top five, while Corey Day, Blaine Perkins, Dean Thompson, Brandon Jones, and Anthony Alfredo rounded out the top ten.

Following the race, Taylor Gray, Austin Hill, Jones, Parker Retzlaff, and Rajah Caruth were mathimatically eliminated from championship contention.

== Report ==
=== Background ===
Talladega Superspeedway, the track where the race was held.

Talladega Superspeedway, formerly known as Alabama International Motor Speedway, is a motorsports complex located north of Talladega, Alabama. It is located on the former Anniston Air Force Base in the small city of Lincoln. A tri-oval, the track was constructed in 1969 by the International Speedway Corporation, a business controlled by the France family. Talladega is most known for its steep banking. The track currently hosts NASCAR's Cup Series, O'Reilly Auto Parts Series, and Craftsman Truck Series. Talladega is the longest NASCAR oval with a length of 2.66-mile-long (4.28 km) tri-oval like the Daytona International Speedway, which is 2.5-mile-long (4.0 km).

The Progress Group (or TPG) was announced as the title sponsor on January 8, 2026.

==== Entry list ====
- (R) denotes rookie driver.
- (i) denotes driver who is ineligible for series driver points.
- (CC) denotes chase contender.
- (OC) denotes owners' chase contender car.

#	Driver	Team	Make
00	Sheldon Creed (CC)	Haas Factory Team	Chevrolet
0	Garrett Smithley	SS-Green Light Racing	Chevrolet
1	Carson Kvapil (CC)	JR Motorsports	Chevrolet
02	Ryan Ellis	Young's Motorsports	Chevrolet
2	Jesse Love (CC)	Richard Childress Racing	Chevrolet
4	Caesar Bacarella	Alpha Prime Racing	Chevrolet
07	Josh Bilicki	SS-Green Light Racing	Chevrolet
7	Justin Allgaier (CC)	JR Motorsports	Chevrolet
8	Sammy Smith (CC)	JR Motorsports	Chevrolet
9	Jake Finch	JR Motorsports	Chevrolet
17	Corey Day (CC)	Hendrick Motorsports	Chevrolet
18	William Sawalich	Joe Gibbs Racing	Toyota
19	Brent Crews (OC) (R)	Joe Gibbs Racing	Toyota
20	Brandon Jones (CC)	Joe Gibbs Racing	Toyota
21	Austin Hill (CC)	Richard Childress Racing	Chevrolet
24	Harrison Burton	Sam Hunt Racing	Toyota
26	Dean Thompson	Sam Hunt Racing	Toyota
27	Jeb Burton	Jordan Anderson Racing	Chevrolet
28	Kyle Sieg	RSS Racing	Chevrolet
31	Blaine Perkins	Jordan Anderson Racing	Chevrolet
32	Daniel Dye (i)	Jordan Anderson Racing	Chevrolet
38	Patrick Emerling (i)	RSS Racing	Chevrolet
39	Ryan Sieg	RSS Racing	Chevrolet
41	Sam Mayer (CC)	Haas Factory Team	Chevrolet
42	Nick Leitz (i)	Young's Motorsports	Chevrolet
43	Connor Mosack (i)	SPS Racing	Chevrolet
44	Brennan Poole	Alpha Prime Racing	Chevrolet
45	Lavar Scott (R)	Alpha Prime Racing	Ford
47	Carson Ware	Mike Harmon Racing	Chevrolet
48	Patrick Staropoli (R)	Big Machine Racing	Chevrolet
51	Jeremy Clements	Jeremy Clements Racing	Chevrolet
53	Will Rodgers	Joey Gase Motorsports	Chevrolet
54	Taylor Gray (CC)	Joe Gibbs Racing	Toyota
55	Joey Gase	Joey Gase Motorsports	Chevrolet
71	Leland Honeyman (i)	DGM Racing	Chevrolet
87	Lee Pulliam	Peterson Racing	Chevrolet
88	Rajah Caruth (CC)	JR Motorsports	Chevrolet
91	Mason Maggio	DGM Racing	Chevrolet
92	Josh Williams	DGM Racing	Chevrolet
96	Anthony Alfredo	Viking Motorsports	Chevrolet
99	Parker Retzlaff (CC)	Viking Motorsports	Chevrolet
Official entry list

== Qualifying ==
Qualifying was held on Saturday, October 24, at 11:00 AM EST. Since Talladega Superspeedway is a superspeedway, the qualifying procedure used was a single-car, single-lap system with two rounds. In the first round, drivers had one lap to set a time and determined positions 11-38. The fastest ten drivers from the first round advanced to the second round, and whoever set the fastest time in Round 2 won the pole and determined the rest of the starting lineup.

Jesse Love, driving for Richard Childress Racing, qualified on pole position, having advanced from the preliminary round and set the fastest time in Round 2, with a lap of 52.435 seconds, and a speed of 182.626 miles per hour (293.908 km/h).

Three drivers failed to qualify: Lavar Scott, Carson Ware, and Patrick Emerling.

=== Qualifying results ===
Pos.	#	Driver	Team	Make	Time (R1)	Speed (R1)	Time (R2)	Speed (R2)
1	2	Jesse Love (CC)	Richard Childress Racing	Chevrolet	52.572	182.150	52.435	182.626
2	9	Jake Finch	JR Motorsports	Chevrolet	52.541	182.258	52.437	182.619
3	41	Sam Mayer (CC)	Haas Factory Team	Chevrolet	52.582	182.116	52.469	182.508
4	1	Carson Kvapil (CC)	JR Motorsports	Chevrolet	52.569	182.161	52.485	182.452
5	21	Austin Hill (CC)	Richard Childress Racing	Chevrolet	52.724	181.625	52.491	182.431
6	88	Rajah Caruth (CC)	JR Motorsports	Chevrolet	52.669	181.815	52.595	182.071
7	96	Anthony Alfredo	Viking Motorsports	Chevrolet	52.689	181.746	52.618	181.991
8	19	Brent Crews (OC) (R)	Joe Gibbs Racing	Toyota	52.767	181.477	52.660	181.846
9	18	William Sawalich	Joe Gibbs Racing	Toyota	52.774	181.453	52.704	181.694
10	17	Corey Day (CC)	Hendrick Motorsports	Chevrolet	52.685	181.760	—	—
Eliminated in Round 1
11	8	Sammy Smith (CC)	JR Motorsports	Chevrolet	52.778	181.439	—	—
12	00	Sheldon Creed (CC)	Haas Factory Team	Chevrolet	52.785	181.415	—	—
13	42	Nick Leitz (i)	Young's Motorsports	Chevrolet	52.788	181.405	—	—
14	7	Justin Allgaier (CC)	JR Motorsports	Chevrolet	52.824	181.281	—	—
15	51	Jeremy Clements	Jeremy Clements Racing	Chevrolet	52.839	181.230	—	—
16	20	Brandon Jones (CC)	Joe Gibbs Racing	Toyota	52.854	181.178	—	—
17	54	Taylor Gray (CC)	Joe Gibbs Racing	Toyota	52.894	181.041	—	—
18	4	Caesar Bacarella	Alpha Prime Racing	Chevrolet	52.903	181.011	—	—
19	24	Harrison Burton	Sam Hunt Racing	Toyota	52.927	180.928	—	—
20	02	Ryan Ellis	Young's Motorsports	Chevrolet	52.954	180.836	—	—
21	48	Patrick Staropoli (R)	Big Machine Racing	Chevrolet	53.016	180.625	—	—
22	92	Josh Williams	DGM Racing	Chevrolet	53.029	180.580	—	—
23	43	Connor Mosack (i)	SPS Racing	Chevrolet	53.032	180.570	—	—
24	91	Mason Maggio	DGM Racing	Chevrolet	53.045	180.526	—	—
25	39	Ryan Sieg	RSS Racing	Chevrolet	53.083	180.397	—	—
26	99	Parker Retzlaff (CC)	Viking Motorsports	Chevrolet	53.100	180.339	—	—
27	26	Dean Thompson	Sam Hunt Racing	Toyota	53.101	180.336	—	—
28	55	Joey Gase	Joey Gase Motorsports	Chevrolet	53.132	180.230	—	—
29	28	Kyle Sieg	RSS Racing	Chevrolet	53.138	180.210	—	—
30	53	Will Rodgers	Joey Gase Motorsports	Chevrolet	53.217	179.942	—	—
31	71	Leland Honeyman (i)	DGM Racing	Chevrolet	53.302	179.656	—	—
32	27	Jeb Burton	Jordan Anderson Racing	Chevrolet	53.311	179.625	—	—
Qualified by owner's points
33	32	Daniel Dye (i)	Jordan Anderson Racing	Chevrolet	53.343	179.517	—	—
34	44	Brennan Poole	Alpha Prime Racing	Chevrolet	53.365	179.443	—	—
35	07	Josh Bilicki	SS-Green Light Racing	Chevrolet	53.488	179.031	—	—
36	31	Blaine Perkins	Jordan Anderson Racing	Chevrolet	53.506	178.971	—	—
37	0	Garrett Smithley	SS-Green Light Racing	Chevrolet	53.947	177.508	—	—
38	87	Lee Pulliam	Peterson Racing	Chevrolet	—	—	—	—
Failed to qualify
39	45	Lavar Scott (R)	Alpha Prime Racing	Ford	53.317	179.605		
40	47	Carson Ware	Mike Harmon Racing	Chevrolet	53.879	177.732		
41	38	Patrick Emerling (i)	RSS Racing	Chevrolet	54.317	176.298		
Official qualifying results
Official starting lineup

== Race ==
=== Race results ===
==== Stage Results ====
Stage One Laps: 20

Pos.	#	Driver	Team	Make	Pts
1	1	Carson Kvapil (CC)	JR Motorsports	Chevrolet	10
2	88	Rajah Caruth (CC)	JR Motorsports	Chevrolet	9
3	7	Justin Allgaier (CC)	JR Motorsports	Chevrolet	8
4	17	Corey Day (CC)	Hendrick Motorsports	Chevrolet	7
5	00	Sheldon Creed (CC)	Haas Factory Team	Chevrolet	6
6	43	Connor Mosack (i)	SPS Racing	Chevrolet	0
7	54	Taylor Gray (CC)	Joe Gibbs Racing	Toyota	4
8	9	Jake Finch	JR Motorsports	Chevrolet	3
9	51	Jeremy Clements	Jeremy Clements Racing	Chevrolet	2
10	18	William Sawalich	Joe Gibbs Racing	Toyota	1

Stage Two Laps: 20

Pos.	#	Driver	Team	Make	Pts
1	7	Justin Allgaier (CC)	JR Motorsports	Chevrolet	10
2	1	Carson Kvapil (CC)	JR Motorsports	Chevrolet	9
3	8	Sammy Smith (CC)	JR Motorsports	Chevrolet	8
4	21	Austin Hill (CC)	Richard Childress Racing	Chevrolet	7
5	17	Corey Day (CC)	Hendrick Motorsports	Chevrolet	6
6	00	Sheldon Creed (CC)	Haas Factory Team	Chevrolet	5
7	24	Harrison Burton	Sam Hunt Racing	Toyota	4
8	19	Brent Crews (OC) (R)	Joe Gibbs Racing	Toyota	3
9	96	Anthony Alfredo	Viking Motorsports	Chevrolet	2
10	71	Leland Honeyman (i)	DGM Racing	Chevrolet	0

=== Final Stage Results ===
Stage Three Laps: 54

Fin	St	#	Driver	Team	Make	Laps	Led	Status	Pts
1	11	8	Sammy Smith (CC)	JR Motorsports	Chevrolet	94	1	Running	63
2	4	1	Carson Kvapil (CC)	JR Motorsports	Chevrolet	94	67	Running	54
3	1	2	Jesse Love (CC)	Richard Childress Racing	Chevrolet	94	0	Running	34
4	14	7	Justin Allgaier (CC)	JR Motorsports	Chevrolet	94	11	Running	51
5	12	00	Sheldon Creed (CC)	Haas Factory Team	Chevrolet	94	0	Running	43
6	10	17	Corey Day (CC)	Hendrick Motorsports	Chevrolet	94	4	Running	44
7	36	31	Blaine Perkins	Jordan Anderson Racing	Chevrolet	94	0	Running	30
8	27	26	Dean Thompson	Sam Hunt Racing	Toyota	94	0	Running	29
9	16	20	Brandon Jones (CC)	Joe Gibbs Racing	Toyota	94	0	Running	28
10	7	96	Anthony Alfredo	Viking Motorsports	Chevrolet	94	0	Running	29
11	32	27	Jeb Burton	Jordan Anderson Racing	Chevrolet	94	0	Running	26
12	24	91	Mason Maggio	DGM Racing	Chevrolet	94	0	Running	25
13	3	41	Sam Mayer (CC)	Haas Factory Team	Chevrolet	94	0	Running	24
14	25	39	Ryan Sieg	RSS Racing	Chevrolet	94	0	Running	23
15	13	42	Nick Leitz (i)	Young's Motorsports	Chevrolet	94	0	Running	0
16	35	07	Josh Bilicki	SS-Green Light Racing	Chevrolet	94	0	Running	21
17	6	88	Rajah Caruth (CC)	JR Motorsports	Chevrolet	94	0	Running	29
18	15	51	Jeremy Clements	Jeremy Clements Racing	Chevrolet	94	0	Running	21
19	23	43	Connor Mosack (i)	SPS Racing	Chevrolet	94	0	Running	0
20	28	55	Joey Gase	Joey Gase Motorsports	Chevrolet	94	1	Running	17
21	17	54	Taylor Gray (CC)	Joe Gibbs Racing	Toyota	94	1	Running	20
22	38	87	Lee Pulliam	Peterson Racing	Chevrolet	94	0	Running	15
23	22	92	Josh Williams	DGM Racing	Chevrolet	94	0	Running	14
24	19	24	Harrison Burton	Sam Hunt Racing	Toyota	94	8	Running	17
25	30	53	Will Rodgers	Joey Gase Motorsports	Chevrolet	94	0	Running	12
26	34	44	Brennan Poole	Alpha Prime Racing	Chevrolet	94	0	Running	12
27	37	0	Garrett Smithley	SS-Green Light Racing	Chevrolet	94	0	Running	10
28	29	28	Kyle Sieg	RSS Racing	Chevrolet	94	0	Running	9
29	9	18	William Sawalich	Joe Gibbs Racing	Toyota	94	0	Running	9
30	20	02	Ryan Ellis	Young's Motorsports	Chevrolet	94	1	Running	7
31	26	99	Parker Retzlaff (CC)	Viking Motorsports	Chevrolet	94	0	Running	6
32	21	48	Patrick Staropoli (R)	Big Machine Racing	Chevrolet	94	0	Running	5
33	33	32	Daniel Dye (i)	Jordan Anderson Racing	Chevrolet	94	0	Running	0
34	8	19	Brent Crews (OC) (R)	Joe Gibbs Racing	Toyota	94	0	Running	6
35	5	21	Austin Hill (CC)	Richard Childress Racing	Chevrolet	92	0	Running	9
36	31	71	Leland Honeyman (i)	DGM Racing	Chevrolet	88	0	Running	0
37	18	4	Caesar Bacarella	Alpha Prime Racing	Chevrolet	85	0	Running	1
38	2	9	Jake Finch	JR Motorsports	Chevrolet	84	0	Accident	4
Official race results

=== Race statistics ===
- Lead changes: 11 among 8 different drivers
- Cautions/Laps: 4 for 20 laps
- Red flags: 0
- Time of race: 1 hour, 47 minutes and 30 seconds
- Average speed: 139.557 miles per hour (224.595 km/h)

== Standings after the race ==
Drivers' Championship standings

	Pos	Driver	Points
	1	Jesse Love	2,401
	2	Justin Allgaier	2,382 (–19)
	3	Corey Day	2,372 (–29)
	4	Sheldon Creed	2,351 (–50)
	5	Carson Kvapil	2,342 (–59)
	6	Sam Mayer	2,305 (–96)
	7	Sammy Smith	2,293 (–108)
	8	Taylor Gray	2,246 (–155)
	9	Austin Hill	2,233 (–168)
1	10	Brandon Jones	2,212 (–189)
1	11	Parker Retzlaff	2,200 (–201)
	12	Rajah Caruth	2,183 (–218)
Official driver's standings

Manufacturers' Championship standings

Pos	Manufacturer	Points
1	Chevrolet	1,644
2	Toyota	1,055 (–589)
3	Ford	281 (–1,363)

- Note: Only the first 12 positions are included for the driver standings.

Previous race: 2026 Timberland PRO 200	NASCAR O'Reilly Auto Parts Series; 2026 season	Next race: 2026 National Debt Relief 250
