= 2024 BetRivers 200 =

10th race of the 2024 NASCAR Xfinity Series

Race details
- Race 10 of 33 of the 2024 NASCAR Xfinity Series
- Date: April 27, 2024
- Official name: 43rd Annual BetRivers 200
- Location: Dover Motor Speedway in Dover, Delaware
- Course: Permanent racing facility
- Course length: 1 miles (1.6 km)
- Distance: 208 laps, 208 mi (334 km)
- Scheduled distance: 200 laps, 200 mi (321 km)
- Average speed: 87.395 mph (140.649 km/h)

Pole position
Driver	Brandon Jones	JR Motorsports
- Time: 22.950

Most laps led
Driver	Cole Custer	Stewart–Haas Racing
- Laps: 95

Winner
No. 20	Ryan Truex	Joe Gibbs Racing

Television in the United States
- Network: FS1
- Announcers: Adam Alexander, Joey Logano, and Ryan Blaney

Radio in the United States
- Radio: PRN

The 2024 BetRivers 200 was the 10th stock car race of the 2024 NASCAR Xfinity Series, and the 43rd iteration of the event. The race was held on Saturday, April 27, 2024, at Dover Motor Speedway in Dover, Delaware, a 1 mile (1.6 km) permanent asphalt oval shaped speedway. The race was originally scheduled to be contested over 200 laps, but was increased to 208 laps due to numerous NASCAR overtime attempts. In a wild race with carnage in the final stages, Ryan Truex, driving for Joe Gibbs Racing, would steal the win after taking the lead from Carson Kvapil on the final restart, and won the race after the caution came out on the final lap. This was Truex's second career NASCAR Xfinity Series win, his first of the season, and his second consecutive win at Dover. Cole Custer had dominated the majority of the race, winning the second stage and leading a race-high 95 laps. He pitted following a brief red flag for rain, and navigated through the field to finish 5th. To fill out the podium, Kvapil and Sam Mayer, both driving for JR Motorsports, would finish 2nd and 3rd, respectively.

This was also the fourth and final race of the Dash 4 Cash. Drivers who were eligible for the Dash 4 Cash were Jesse Love, Riley Herbst, and Anthony Alfredo, since they were the highest finishing Xfinity Series regulars following the race at Talladega. Ryan Sieg was also eligible, due to winning the latest D4C race. Alfredo would claim the $100K bonus cash after finishing 9th, seven positions ahead of his closest competitor, Riley Herbst.

== Report ==
=== Background ===
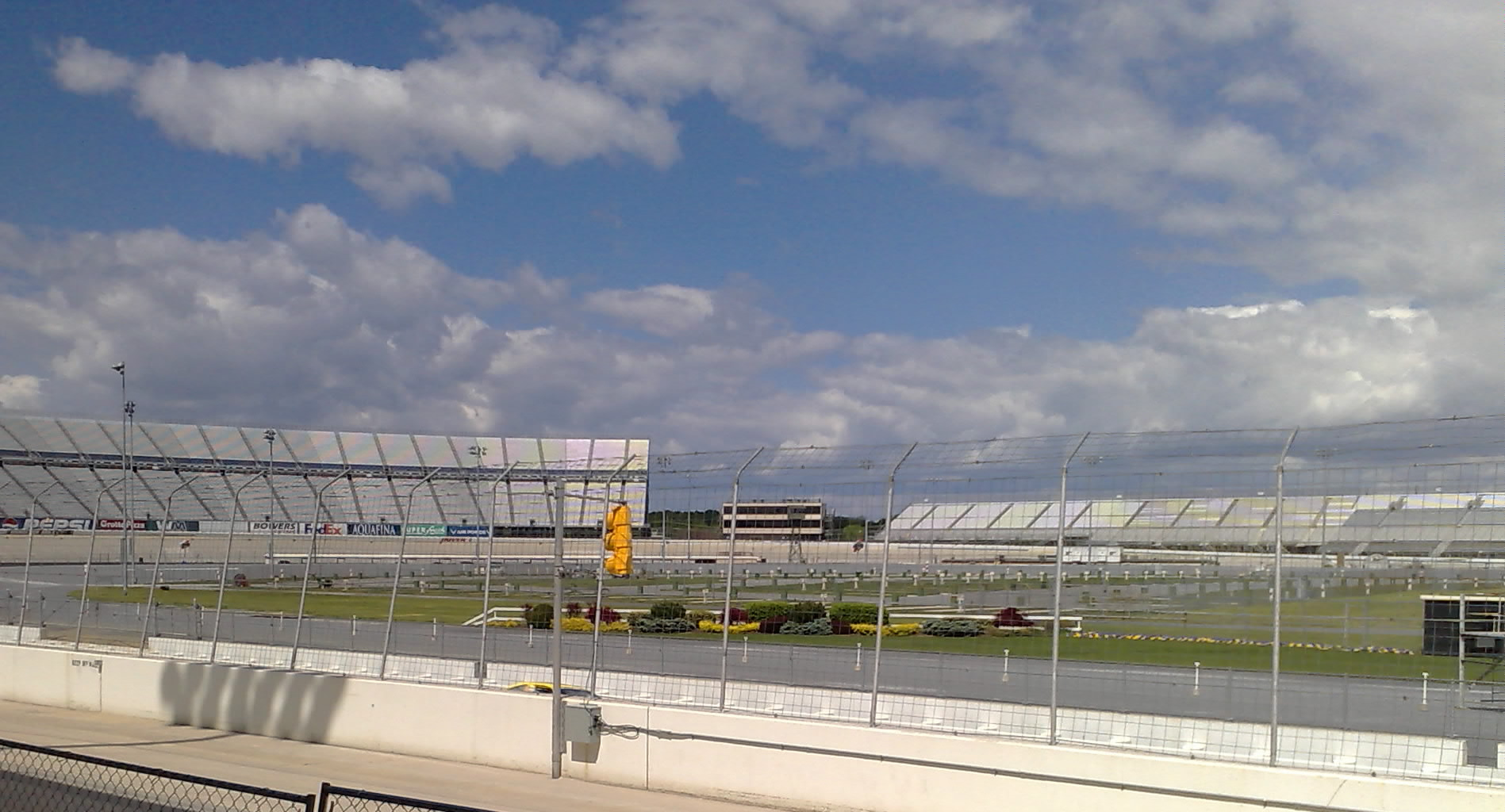
Dover Motor Speedway, the circuit where the race will be held.

Dover Motor Speedway is an oval race track in Dover, Delaware, United States that has held at least two NASCAR races since it opened in 1969. In addition to NASCAR, the track also hosted USAC and the NTT IndyCar Series. The track features one layout, a 1 mile (1.6 km) concrete oval, with 24° banking in the turns and 9° banking on the straights. The speedway is owned and operated by Speedway Motorsports.

The track, nicknamed "The Monster Mile", was built in 1969 by Melvin Joseph of Melvin L. Joseph Construction Company, Inc., with an asphalt surface, but was replaced with concrete in 1995. Six years later in 2001, the track's capacity moved to 135,000 seats, making the track have the largest capacity of sports venue in the mid-Atlantic. In 2002, the name changed to Dover International Speedway from Dover Downs International Speedway after Dover Downs Gaming and Entertainment split, making Dover Motorsports. From 2007 to 2009, the speedway worked on an improvement project called "The Monster Makeover", which expanded facilities at the track and beautified the track. After the 2014 season, the track's capacity was reduced to 95,500 seats.

==== Entry list ====
- (R) denotes rookie driver.
- (i) denotes driver who is ineligible for series driver points.

#	Driver	Team	Make
00	Cole Custer	Stewart–Haas Racing	Ford
1	Sam Mayer	JR Motorsports	Chevrolet
2	Jesse Love (R)	Richard Childress Racing	Chevrolet
4	Dawson Cram (R)	JD Motorsports	Chevrolet
5	Anthony Alfredo	Our Motorsports	Chevrolet
6	Garrett Smithley	JD Motorsports	Chevrolet
07	Patrick Emerling	SS-Green Light Racing	Chevrolet
7	Justin Allgaier	JR Motorsports	Chevrolet
8	Sammy Smith	JR Motorsports	Chevrolet
9	Brandon Jones	JR Motorsports	Chevrolet
10	Daniel Dye (i)	Kaulig Racing	Chevrolet
11	Josh Williams	Kaulig Racing	Chevrolet
14	David Starr	SS-Green Light Racing	Chevrolet
15	Hailie Deegan (R)	AM Racing	Ford
16	A. J. Allmendinger	Kaulig Racing	Chevrolet
18	Sheldon Creed	Joe Gibbs Racing	Toyota
19	Taylor Gray (i)	Joe Gibbs Racing	Toyota
20	Ryan Truex	Joe Gibbs Racing	Toyota
21	Austin Hill	Richard Childress Racing	Chevrolet
26	Corey Heim (i)	Sam Hunt Racing	Toyota
27	Jeb Burton	Jordan Anderson Racing	Chevrolet
28	Kyle Sieg	RSS Racing	Ford
29	Blaine Perkins	RSS Racing	Ford
31	Parker Retzlaff	Jordan Anderson Racing	Chevrolet
35	J. J. Yeley	Joey Gase Motorsports	Toyota
38	Matt DiBenedetto	RSS Racing	Ford
39	Ryan Sieg	RSS Racing	Ford
42	Leland Honeyman (R)	Young's Motorsports	Chevrolet
43	Ryan Ellis	Alpha Prime Racing	Chevrolet
44	Brennan Poole	Alpha Prime Racing	Chevrolet
48	Parker Kligerman	Big Machine Racing	Chevrolet
51	Jeremy Clements	Jeremy Clements Racing	Chevrolet
66	Chad Finchum	MBM Motorsports	Ford
81	Chandler Smith	Joe Gibbs Racing	Toyota
88	Carson Kvapil	JR Motorsports	Chevrolet
91	Kyle Weatherman	DGM Racing	Chevrolet
92	Kaden Honeycutt (i)	DGM Racing	Chevrolet
97	Shane van Gisbergen (R)	Kaulig Racing	Chevrolet
98	Riley Herbst	Stewart–Haas Racing	Ford
Official entry list

== Practice ==
The first and only practice session was held on Friday, April 26, at 3:00 PM EST, and would last for 20 minutes. Brandon Jones, driving for JR Motorsports, would set the fastest time in the session, with a lap of 23.345, and a speed of 154.209 mph (248.175 km/h).

Pos.	#	Driver	Team	Make	Time	Speed
1	9	Brandon Jones	JR Motorsports	Chevrolet	23.345	154.209
2	91	Kyle Weatherman	DGM Racing	Chevrolet	23.441	153.577
3	16	A. J. Allmendinger	Kaulig Racing	Chevrolet	23.467	153.407
Full practice results

== Qualifying ==
Qualifying was held on Friday, April 26, at 3:30 PM EST. Since Dover Motor Speedway is a short track, the qualifying system used is a single-car, two-lap system with only one round. Drivers will be on track by themselves and will have two laps to post a qualifying time. Whoever sets the fastest time in that round will win the pole.

Brandon Jones, driving for JR Motorsports, would score the pole for the race, with a lap of 22.950, and a speed of 156.863 mph (252.447 km/h).

Chad Finchum was the only driver who failed to qualify.

=== Qualifying results ===
Pos.	#	Driver	Team	Make	Time	Speed
1	9	Brandon Jones	JR Motorsports	Chevrolet	22.950	156.863
2	98	Riley Herbst	Stewart–Haas Racing	Ford	22.962	156.781
3	7	Justin Allgaier	JR Motorsports	Chevrolet	22.978	156.672
4	21	Austin Hill	Richard Childress Racing	Chevrolet	23.068	156.060
5	18	Sheldon Creed	Joe Gibbs Racing	Toyota	23.099	155.851
6	91	Kyle Weatherman	DGM Racing	Chevrolet	23.123	155.689
7	81	Chandler Smith	Joe Gibbs Racing	Toyota	23.131	155.635
8	2	Jesse Love (R)	Richard Childress Racing	Chevrolet	23.141	155.568
9	19	Taylor Gray (i)	Joe Gibbs Racing	Toyota	23.141	155.568
10	16	A. J. Allmendinger	Kaulig Racing	Chevrolet	23.165	155.407
11	00	Cole Custer	Stewart–Haas Racing	Ford	23.189	155.246
12	20	Ryan Truex	Joe Gibbs Racing	Toyota	23.202	155.159
13	8	Sammy Smith	JR Motorsports	Chevrolet	23.225	155.005
14	39	Ryan Sieg	RSS Racing	Ford	23.230	154.972
15	48	Parker Kligerman	Big Machine Racing	Chevrolet	23.259	154.779
16	38	Matt DiBenedetto	RSS Racing	Ford	23.260	154.772
17	31	Parker Retzlaff	Jordan Anderson Racing	Chevrolet	23.264	154.746
18	92	Kaden Honeycutt (i)	DGM Racing	Chevrolet	23.273	154.686
19	27	Jeb Burton	Jordan Anderson Racing	Chevrolet	23.360	154.110
20	1	Sam Mayer	JR Motorsports	Chevrolet	23.369	154.050
21	5	Anthony Alfredo	Our Motorsports	Chevrolet	23.442	153.571
22	26	Corey Heim (i)	Sam Hunt Racing	Toyota	23.472	153.374
23	43	Ryan Ellis	Alpha Prime Racing	Chevrolet	23.518	153.074
24	28	Kyle Sieg	RSS Racing	Ford	23.547	152.886
25	51	Jeremy Clements	Jeremy Clements Racing	Chevrolet	23.559	152.808
26	88	Carson Kvapil	JR Motorsports	Chevrolet	23.566	152.762
27	44	Brennan Poole	Alpha Prime Racing	Chevrolet	23.585	152.639
28	42	Leland Honeyman (R)	Young's Motorsports	Chevrolet	23.597	152.562
29	15	Hailie Deegan (R)	AM Racing	Ford	23.625	152.381
30	07	Patrick Emerling	SS-Green Light Racing	Chevrolet	23.673	152.072
31	97	Shane van Gisbergen (R)	Kaulig Racing	Chevrolet	23.773	151.432
32	4	Dawson Cram (R)	JD Motorsports	Chevrolet	23.773	151.432
33	35	J. J. Yeley	Joey Gase Motorsports	Toyota	23.785	151.356
Qualified by owner's points
34	29	Blaine Perkins	RSS Racing	Ford	23.983	150.106
35	6	Garrett Smithley	JD Motorsports	Chevrolet	24.005	149.969
36	10	Daniel Dye (i)	Kaulig Racing	Chevrolet	24.033	149.794
37	14	David Starr	SS-Green Light Racing	Chevrolet	24.065	149.595
38	11	Josh Williams	Kaulig Racing	Chevrolet	24.153	149.050
Failed to qualify
39	66	Chad Finchum	MBM Motorsports	Ford	23.787	151.343
Official qualifying results
Official starting lineup

== Race results ==
Stage 1 Laps: 45

Pos.	#	Driver	Team	Make	Pts
1	7	Justin Allgaier	JR Motorsports	Chevrolet	10
2	9	Brandon Jones	JR Motorsports	Chevrolet	9
3	00	Cole Custer	Stewart-Haas Racing	Ford	8
4	18	Sheldon Creed	Joe Gibbs Racing	Toyota	7
5	98	Riley Herbst	Stewart-Haas Racing	Ford	6
6	21	Austin Hill	Richard Childress Racing	Chevrolet	5
7	81	Chandler Smith	Joe Gibbs Racing	Toyota	4
8	16	A. J. Allmendinger	Kaulig Racing	Chevrolet	3
9	20	Ryan Truex	Joe Gibbs Racing	Toyota	2
10	1	Sam Mayer	JR Motorsports	Chevrolet	1

Stage 2 Laps: 45

Pos.	#	Driver	Team	Make	Pts
1	00	Cole Custer	Stewart-Haas Racing	Ford	10
2	21	Austin Hill	Richard Childress Racing	Chevrolet	9
3	2	Jesse Love (R)	Richard Childress Racing	Chevrolet	8
4	31	Parker Retzlaff	Jordan Anderson Racing	Chevrolet	7
5	18	Sheldon Creed	Joe Gibbs Racing	Toyota	6
6	7	Justin Allgaier	JR Motorsports	Chevrolet	5
7	98	Riley Herbst	Stewart-Haas Racing	Ford	4
8	81	Chandler Smith	Joe Gibbs Racing	Toyota	3
9	8	Sammy Smith	JR Motorsports	Chevrolet	2
10	20	Ryan Truex	Joe Gibbs Racing	Toyota	1

Stage 3 Laps: 118

Fin	St	#	Driver	Team	Make	Laps	Led	Status	Pts
1	12	20	Ryan Truex	Joe Gibbs Racing	Toyota	208	2	Running	43
2	26	88	Carson Kvapil	JR Motorsports	Chevrolet	208	14	Running	35
3	20	1	Sam Mayer	JR Motorsports	Chevrolet	208	0	Running	35
4	5	18	Sheldon Creed	Joe Gibbs Racing	Toyota	208	3	Running	46
5	11	00	Cole Custer	Stewart–Haas Racing	Ford	208	95	Running	50
6	10	16	A. J. Allmendinger	Kaulig Racing	Chevrolet	208	0	Running	34
7	7	81	Chandler Smith	Joe Gibbs Racing	Toyota	208	0	Running	37
8	6	91	Kyle Weatherman	DGM Racing	Chevrolet	208	0	Running	29
9	21	5	Anthony Alfredo	Our Motorsports	Chevrolet	208	0	Running	28
10	17	31	Parker Retzlaff	Jordan Anderson Racing	Chevrolet	208	3	Running	34
11	19	27	Jeb Burton	Jordan Anderson Racing	Chevrolet	208	0	Running	26
12	15	48	Parker Kligerman	Big Machine Racing	Chevrolet	208	0	Running	25
13	23	43	Ryan Ellis	Alpha Prime Racing	Chevrolet	208	0	Running	24
14	25	51	Jeremy Clements	Jeremy Clements Racing	Chevrolet	208	0	Running	23
15	4	21	Austin Hill	Richard Childress Racing	Chevrolet	208	17	Running	36
16	2	98	Riley Herbst	Stewart–Haas Racing	Ford	208	0	Running	31
17	3	7	Justin Allgaier	JR Motorsports	Chevrolet	208	39	Running	35
18	31	97	Shane van Gisbergen (R)	Kaulig Racing	Chevrolet	208	0	Running	19
19	1	9	Brandon Jones	JR Motorsports	Chevrolet	208	13	Running	27
20	36	10	Daniel Dye (i)	Kaulig Racing	Chevrolet	208	0	Running	0
21	28	42	Leland Honeyman (R)	Young's Motorsports	Chevrolet	207	0	Running	16
22	27	44	Brennan Poole	Alpha Prime Racing	Chevrolet	207	0	Running	15
23	18	92	Kaden Honeycutt (i)	DGM Racing	Chevrolet	206	0	Running	0
24	8	2	Jesse Love (R)	Richard Childress Racing	Chevrolet	206	21	Running	21
25	38	11	Josh Williams	Kaulig Racing	Chevrolet	206	0	Running	12
26	37	14	David Starr	SS-Green Light Racing	Chevrolet	206	0	Running	11
27	24	28	Kyle Sieg	RSS Racing	Ford	206	1	Running	10
28	30	07	Patrick Emerling	SS-Green Light Racing	Chevrolet	205	0	Running	9
29	32	4	Dawson Cram (R)	JD Motorsports	Chevrolet	205	0	Running	8
30	35	6	Garrett Smithley	JD Motorsports	Chevrolet	202	0	Running	7
31	29	15	Hailie Deegan (R)	AM Racing	Ford	200	0	Running	6
32	16	38	Matt DiBenedetto	RSS Racing	Ford	196	0	Running	5
33	13	8	Sammy Smith	JR Motorsports	Chevrolet	192	0	Accident	6
34	9	19	Taylor Gray (i)	Joe Gibbs Racing	Toyota	183	0	Accident	0
35	22	26	Corey Heim (i)	Sam Hunt Racing	Toyota	85	0	Engine	0
36	34	29	Blaine Perkins	RSS Racing	Ford	47	0	Electrical	1
37	14	39	Ryan Sieg	RSS Racing	Ford	25	0	Engine	1
38	33	35	J. J. Yeley	Joey Gase Motorsports	Toyota	4	0	Accident	1
Official race results

== Standings after the race ==
Drivers' Championship standings

	Pos	Driver	Points
	1	Chandler Smith	394
	2	Cole Custer	393 (-1)
	3	Austin Hill	377 (–17)
	4	Jesse Love	337 (–57)
	5	Justin Allgaier	313 (–81)
	6	Riley Herbst	303 (–91)
	7	A. J. Allmendinger	295 (–99)
2	8	Sheldon Creed	277 (–117)
	9	Parker Kligerman	261 (–133)
2	10	Anthony Alfredo	247 (–147)
3	11	Sammy Smith	247 (–147)
1	12	Brandon Jones	232 (–162)
Official driver's standings

Manufacturers' Championship standings

Pos	Manufacturer	Points
1	Chevrolet	370
2	Toyota	365 (–5)
3	Ford	311 (–59)

- Note: Only the first 12 positions are included for the driver standings.

Previous race: 2024 Ag-Pro 300	NASCAR Xfinity Series; 2024 season	Next race: 2024 Crown Royal Purple Bag Project 200
