= Carson Kvapil =

American racing driver (born 2003)

- Kvapil at Las Vegas Motor Speedway in 2026
- Born: Carson Wade Kvapil; May 22, 2003 (age 23); Mooresville, North Carolina, U.S.
- Height: 5 ft 9 in (1.75 m)
- Weight: 170 lb (77 kg)
- Achievements: 2021 CARS Super Late Model Tour Champion; 2022, 2023 CARS Late Model Stock Tour Champion; 2020 Carolina Pro Late Model Series Champion; 2024 ValleyStar Credit Union 300 Winner; 2022 Window World 125 Winner; 2022 Old North State Nationals Winner; 2024 Icebreaker 125 Winner
- Awards: 2019 CARS Super Late Model Tour Rookie of the Year

NASCAR O'Reilly Auto Parts Series career
- 75 races run over 3 years
- Car no., team: No. 8 (JR Motorsports)
- 2026 position: 3rd
- Best finish: 3rd (2026)
- First race: 2024 Dude Wipes 250 (Martinsville)
- Last race: 2026 O'Reilly Auto Parts 300 (Homestead)
- First win: 2026 Pennzoil 250 (Indianapolis)
- Last win: 2026 National Debt Relief 250 (Martinsville)
| Wins | Top tens | Poles |
|---|---|---|
| 3 | 39 | 3 |

NASCAR FedEx Freight Truck Series career
- 2 races run over 2 years
- 2025 position: 96th
- Best finish: 96th (2025)
- First race: 2023 UNOH 200 (Bristol)
- Last race: 2025 eero 250 (Richmond)
| Wins | Top tens | Poles |
|---|---|---|
| 0 | 0 | 0 |

ARCA Menards Series career
- 3 races run over 2 years
- Best finish: 48th (2024)
- First race: 2023 Sioux Chief Fast Track 150 (Kansas)
- Last race: 2024 General Tire 150 (Charlotte)
| Wins | Top tens | Poles |
|---|---|---|
| 0 | 3 | 0 |

ARCA Menards Series East career
- 4 races run over 2 years
- Best finish: 20th (2021)
- First race: 2021 Jeep Beach 175 (New Smyrna)
- Last race: 2024 General Tire 150 (Dover)
| Wins | Top tens | Poles |
|---|---|---|
| 0 | 1 | 0 |
- Statistics up to date as of November 7, 2026.

Carson Wade Kvapil (born May 22, 2003) is an American professional stock car racing driver. He competes full-time in the NASCAR O'Reilly Auto Parts Series, driving the No. 8 Chevrolet Camaro SS for JR Motorsports.

He is the son of 2003 NASCAR Craftsman Truck Series champion Travis Kvapil and older brother of Super Late Model driver Caden Kvapil.

== Racing career ==
In 2017, Kvapil ran in select events in the Southeast Limited Late Model Series as well as the Challenger Division. It was in the latter series where he won in two of three starts in the division that year, with those wins coming at Dillon Motor Speedway and Florence Motor Speedway. In the following year, he ran select races in the ARCA Midwest Tour, winning in his first start at Golden Sands Speedway before twentieth and fourth in his next starts at Grundy County Speedway and Dells Raceway Park respectively. He also made his CARS Late Model Stock Tour debut that year, driving the No. 35 Chevrolet, and finished 17th at Tri-County Speedway.

In 2019, Kvapil ran three races of the CARS Super Late Model Tour and got a best finish of second at South Boston Speedway. He also ran one Late Model Tour race at Orange County Speedway, finishing 22nd. In 2020, he ran all but one race in the Super Late Model Tour and finished fifth in the standings with a best finish of fourth at both events at Hickory Motor Speedway. Also in 2020, he won the Carolina Pro Late Model Series championship, winning six races despite running in only seven of the nine scheduled events.

In 2021, Kvapil ran the full Super Late Model Tour schedule in the No. 35 Chevrolet for his father Travis. He won the championship over Matt Craig by one point by virtue of his win in the season finale at South Boston. Also in 2021, he ran three ARCA Menards Series East races for Cook-Finley Racing in the No. 41 Chevrolet. He failed to finish all three events he entered, finishing 14th at the season-opening race at New Smyrna Speedway due to an ignition issue, 11th at Five Flags Speedway due to vibration, and again 11th at Nashville Fairgrounds Speedway due to engine issues.

In 2022, Kvapil joined JR Motorsports in its Drivers Edge Development program alongside plans to run the full Late Model Stock Tour in the No. 8 Chevrolet, replacing Josh Berry, who ran full-time with the team in the NASCAR Xfinity Series that year. He started off his season by winning the first race of the year at the Old State Nationals event at Caraway Speedway after leading 59 laps. After finishes of second, third, and fourth in the next three rounds, he won at Franklin County Speedway on his nineteenth birthday. He then won the inaugural Window World 125 at North Wilkesboro Speedway in August. Kvapil was suspended from the event at Ace Speedway and was fined $500 after he turned Zack Miracle into the wall on the cooldown lap of the Tri-County event. Despite this, he went on to secure the championship on his first race after his suspension with a win at South Boston and finished third in the final race of the year at Caraway.

In 2023, Kvapil won his second straight Late Model Stock Tour championship, getting five wins and finishing in the top-ten in all but one race that year. It was also during this year that he returned to ARCA, this time making his debut in the main ARCA series, driving the No. 28 Chevrolet for Pinnacle Racing Group at Kansas Speedway, where he finished in second behind race winner Connor Mosack. He also made his debut in the NASCAR Craftsman Truck Series driving the No. 7 Chevrolet for Spire Motorsports at Bristol Motor Speedway, where he started in 27th but went on to finish in 12th.

=== O'Reilly Auto Parts Series: 2024–present ===
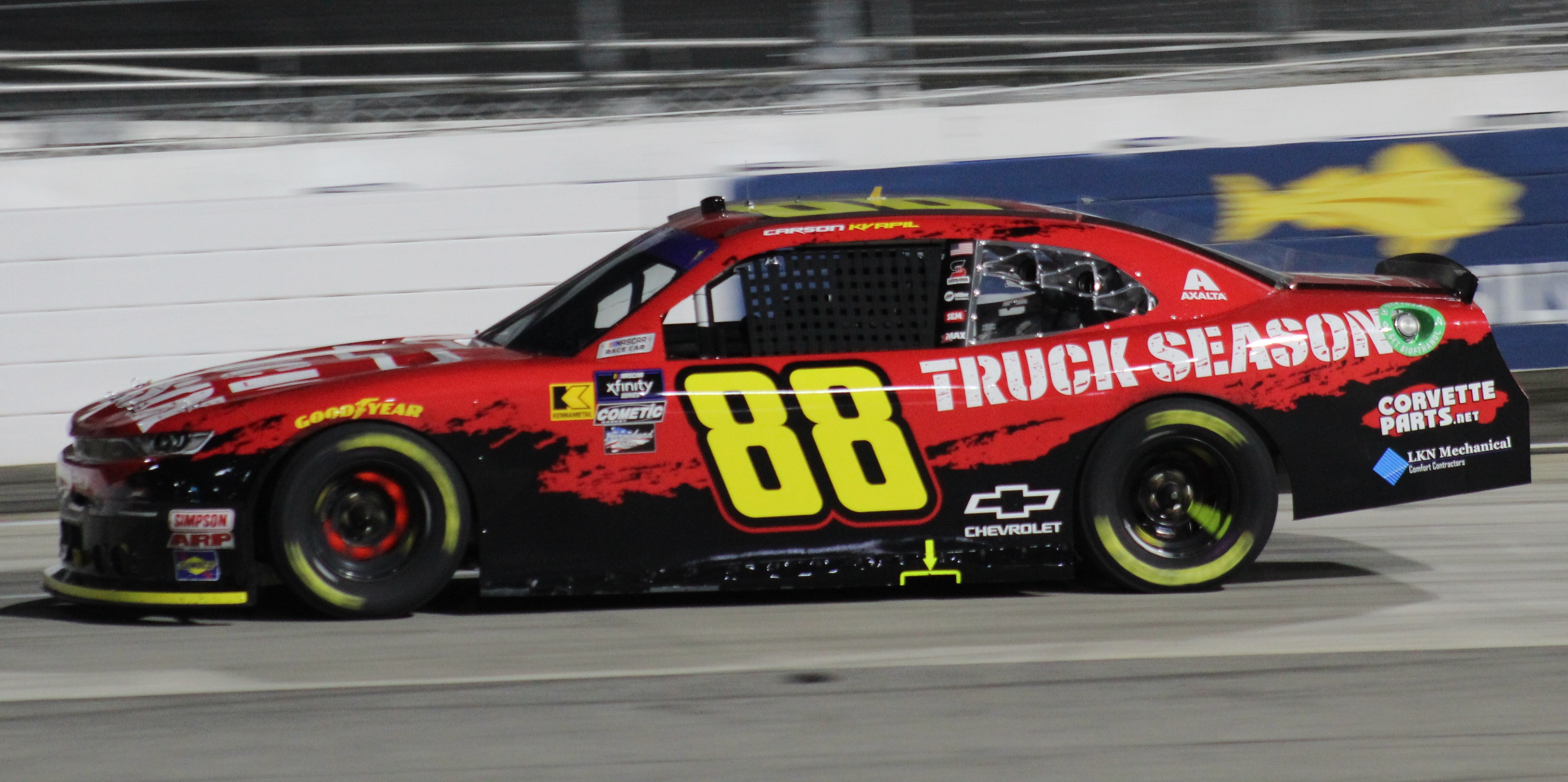
Kvapil's car at Martinsville Speedway in 2024.

On February 22, 2024, it was announced that Kvapil would attempt to make his NASCAR Xfinity Series debut at Martinsville Speedway, driving the No. 88 Chevrolet for JR Motorsports. Kvapil impressed from the start finishing in fourth place. Three weeks later, in just his second career Xfinity Series start, Kvapil was in position to win at Dover Motor Speedway and led fourteen laps of the race in the closing laps, but ultimately finished in second behind Ryan Truex at the end of the race.

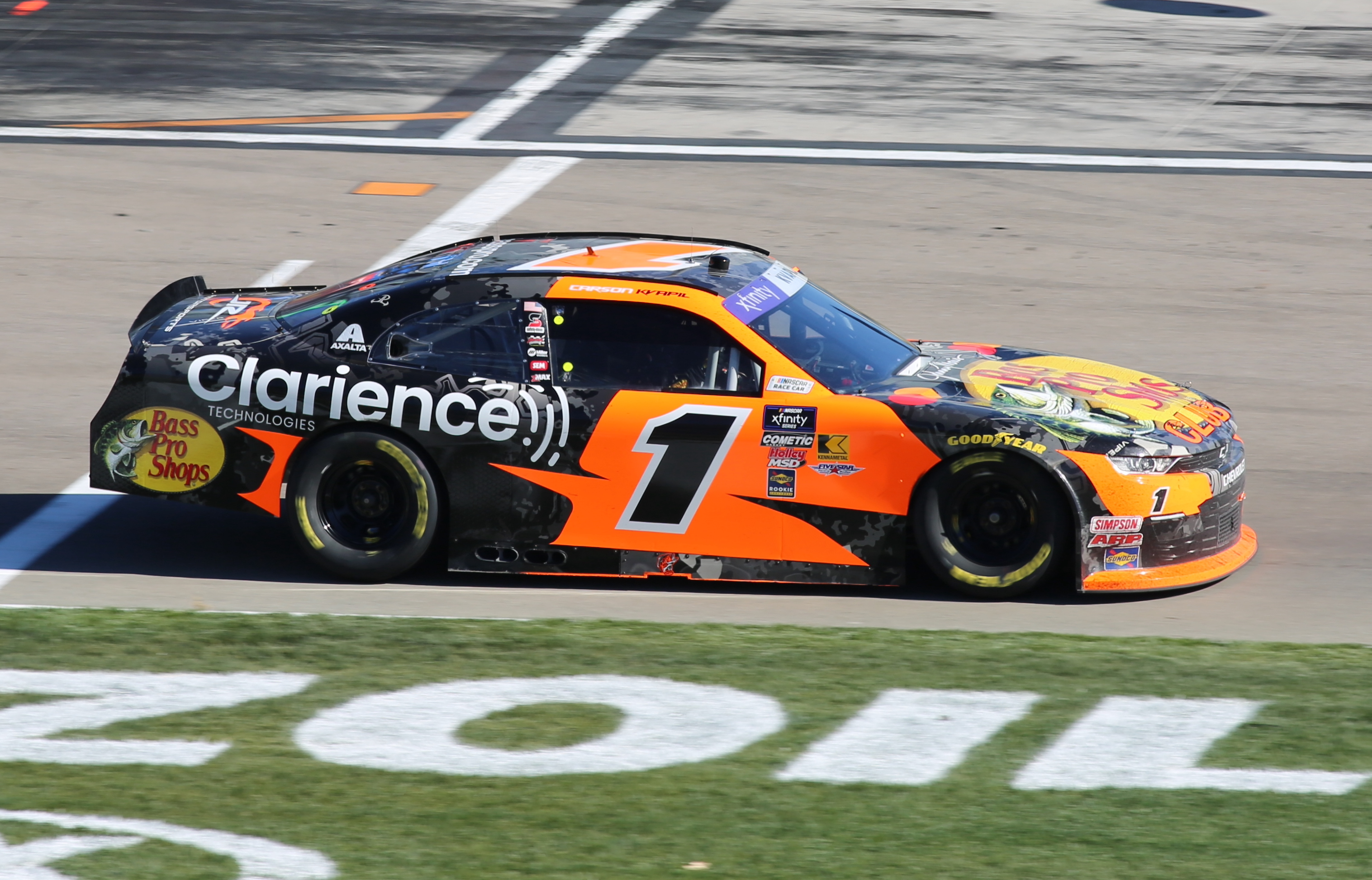
Kvapil's No. 1 car at Las Vegas Motor Speedway in 2025

On October 1, 2024, it was announced that Kvapil would run full-time for JRM in the Xfinity Series in 2025, driving the No. 1 Chevrolet and replacing Sam Mayer who moved to Haas Factory Team. Also during 2025, Kvapil competed for CR7 Motorsports in the NASCAR Craftsman Truck Series, driving the No. 97 truck at Richmond.

On September 24, 2025, it was announced that Kvapil will drive the No. 1 car part-time for the 2026 season, sharing with Connor Zilisch. However, on October 29, 2025, JRM clarified that Kvapil will continue driving full-time for them.

On April 18, 2026, during the 2026 Kansas Lottery 300, Kvapil was involved in a major crash on lap 2. As the caution was being thrown for an incident involving Josh Bilicki and Kyle Sieg, Kvapil was clipped in the left rear by William Byron. The contact sent Kvapil spinning into the wall and into the path of Parker Retzlaff. The collision with Retzlaff allowed enough air to get underneath his car, flipping it onto its roof. Kvapil's car slid on its roof before flipping once and coming to a stop upside down. After the red flag was thrown, Kvapil was flipped back onto all four wheels by safety crews, Kvapil got out of the car under his own power, and was released from the infield care center shortly after. He scored his first career victories at Indianapolis and Iowa. During "The Chase", Kvapil lost in a final-lap battle over Corey Day at Las Vegas. He won at Martinsville during "The Chase".

On August 27, 2026, the day after Sammy Smith was announced to leave JRM, Kvapil was announced to be the driver of the No. 8 for JRM.

== Personal life ==
Kvapil is the son of 2003 NASCAR Craftsman Truck Series champion Travis Kvapil. He also has a brother named Caden and a sister named Kelsey, the first of which currently competes in the CARS Pro Late Model Tour.

== Motorsports career results ==
=== Stock car career summary ===
| Season | Series | Team | Races | Wins | Top 5 | Top 10 | Points | Position |
|---|---|---|---|---|---|---|---|---|
| 2018 | CARS Late Model Stock Car Tour | Travis Kvapil Racing | 2 | 0 | 0 | 0 | 28 | 40th |
| 2019 | CARS Late Model Stock Car Tour | Travis Kvapil Racing | 1 | 0 | 0 | 0 | 11 | 59th |
| 2019 | CARS Super Late Model Tour | Travis Kvapil Racing | 1 | 0 | 1 | 1 | 78 | 12th |
| 2019 | CARS Super Late Model Tour | GMS Racing | 2 | 0 | 0 | 2 | 78 | 12th |
| 2020 | CARS Super Late Model Tour | Travis Kvapil Racing | 7 | 0 | 3 | 5 | 164 | 5th |
| 2021 | CARS Late Model Stock Car Tour | JR Motorsports | 1 | 0 | 1 | 1 | 30 | 34th |
| 2021 | CARS Super Late Model Tour | Travis Kvapil Racing | 8 | 4 | 6 | 7 | 253 | **1st** |
| 2021 | ARCA Menards Series East | Cook-Finley Racing | 3 | 0 | 0 | 0 | 96 | 20th |
| 2022 | CARS Late Model Stock Car Tour | JR Motorsports | 14 | 4 | 13 | 13 | 432 | **1st** |
| 2023 | CARS Late Model Stock Car Tour | JR Motorsports | 16 | 5 | 13 | 15 | 495 | **1st** |
| 2023 | CARS Pro Late Model Tour | Travis Kvapil Racing | 1 | 1 | 1 | 1 | 37 | 36th |
| 2023 | ARCA Menards Series | Pinnacle Racing Group | 1 | 0 | 1 | 1 | 42 | 69th |
| 2023 | NASCAR Craftsman Truck Series | Spire Motorsports | 1 | 0 | 0 | 0 | 0 | NC† |
| 2024 | ARCA Menards Series | Pinnacle Racing Group | 2 | 0 | 2 | 2 | 85 | 48th |
| 2024 | ARCA Menards Series East | Pinnacle Racing Group | 1 | 0 | 1 | 1 | 41 | 38th |
| 2024 | CARS Late Model Stock Car Tour | JR Motorsports | 13 | 3 | 9 | 11 | 366 | 7th |
| 2024 | NASCAR Xfinity Series | JR Motorsports | 9 | 0 | 3 | 4 | 227 | 30th |
| 2025 | CARS Late Model Stock Car Tour | Go Fas Racing | 1 | 0 | 0 | 0 | 13 | 98th |
| 2025 | NASCAR Craftsman Truck Series | CR7 Motorsports | 1 | 0 | 0 | 0 | 0 | NC† |
| 2025 | NASCAR Xfinity Series | JR Motorsports | 33 | 0 | 7 | 14 | 4024 | 4th |
| 2026 | CARS Late Model Stock Car Tour | Go Fas Racing | 1 | 0 | 0 | 1 | 36 | 54th |
| 2026 | NASCAR O'Reilly Auto Parts Series | JR Motorsports | 29 | 3 | 14 | 21 | 2449 | **3rd** |
| 2026 | NASCAR O'Reilly Auto Parts Series | DGM Racing | 4 | 0 | 0 | 2 | 2449 | **3rd** |

^{†} As Kvapil was a guest driver, he was ineligible for championship points.

=== NASCAR ===
(key) (Bold – Pole position awarded by qualifying time. Italics – Pole position earned by points standings or practice time. * – Most laps led. ** – All laps led.)

==== O'Reilly Auto Parts Series ====
NASCAR O'Reilly Auto Parts Series results
| Year | Team | No. | Make | 1 | 2 | 3 | 4 | 5 | 6 | 7 | 8 | 9 | 10 | 11 | 12 | 13 | 14 | 15 | 16 | 17 | 18 | 19 | 20 | 21 | 22 | 23 | 24 | 25 | 26 | 27 | 28 | 29 | 30 | 31 | 32 | 33 | NOAPSC | Pts | Ref |
|---|---|---|---|---|---|---|---|---|---|---|---|---|---|---|---|---|---|---|---|---|---|---|---|---|---|---|---|---|---|---|---|---|---|---|---|---|---|---|---|
| 2024 | JR Motorsports | 88 | Chevy | DAY | ATL | LVS | PHO | COA | RCH | MAR; 4 | TEX | TAL | DOV; 2 | DAR; 19 | CLT | PIR | SON | IOW | NHA; 5 | NSH; 12 | CSC | POC | IND; 10 | MCH; 26 | DAY | DAR; 14 | ATL | GLN | BRI | KAN | TAL; 27 | ROV | LVS | HOM | MAR | PHO | 30th | 227 | |
| 2025 | JR Motorsports | 1 | Chevy | DAY; 4 | ATL; 23 | COA; 23 | PHO; 26 | LVS; 17 | HOM; 10 | MAR; 20 | DAR; 5 | BRI; 2 | CAR; 16 | TAL; 17 | TEX; 19 | CLT; 17 | NSH; 9 | MXC; 19 | POC; 6 | ATL; 2 | CSC; 16 | SON; 8 | DOV; 15 | IND; 30 | IOW; 9 | GLN; 5 | DAY; 10 | PIR; 6 | GTW; 37 | BRI; 4 | KAN; 15 | ROV; 15 | LVS; 15 | TAL; 2 | MAR; 18 | PHO; 13 | 4th | 4024 | |
| 2026 | JR Motorsports | 1 | Chevy | DAY; 7 | ATL; 32 | | PHO; 3 | | DAR; 5 | MAR; 28 | CAR; 5 | | KAN; 37 | TAL; 22 | | | DOV; 7 | | NSH; 7 | | COR; 4 | | | ATL; 2 | IND; 1 | IOW; 1 | DAY; 3* | **DAR**; 12 | **GTW**; 5* | BRI; 24 | LVS; 2 | CLT; 32 | PHO; 10 | TAL; 2* | **MAR**; 1* | HOM; 2 | 3rd | 2449 | |
| 2026 | DGM Racing with Jesse Iwuji Motorsports | 91 | Chevy | | | COA; 19 | | | | | | | | | | GLN; 14 | | CLT; 9 | | | | SON; 6 | | | | | | | | | | | | | | | 3rd | 2449 | |
| 2026 | JR Motorsports | 9 | Chevy | | | | | LVS; 11 | | | | BRI; 5 | | | TEX; 11 | | | | | POC; 10 | | | CHI; 11 | | | | | | | | | | | | | | 3rd | 2449 | |

==== Craftsman Truck Series ====
NASCAR Craftsman Truck Series results
| Year | Team | No. | Make | 1 | 2 | 3 | 4 | 5 | 6 | 7 | 8 | 9 | 10 | 11 | 12 | 13 | 14 | 15 | 16 | 17 | 18 | 19 | 20 | 21 | 22 | 23 | 24 | 25 | NCTC | Pts | Ref |
|---|---|---|---|---|---|---|---|---|---|---|---|---|---|---|---|---|---|---|---|---|---|---|---|---|---|---|---|---|---|---|---|
| 2023 | Spire Motorsports | 7 | Chevy | DAY | LVS | ATL | COA | TEX | BRD | MAR | KAN | DAR | NWS | CLT | GTW | NSH | MOH | POC | RCH | IRP | MLW | KAN | BRI; 12 | TAL | HOM | PHO | | | 100th | 0^{1} | |
| 2025 | CR7 Motorsports | 97 | Chevy | DAY | ATL | LVS | HOM | MAR | BRI | CAR | TEX | KAN | NWS | CLT | NSH | MCH | POC | LRP | IRP | GLN | RCH; 15 | DAR | BRI | NHA | ROV | TAL | MAR | PHO | 96th | 0^{1} | |

^{*} Season still in progress
^{1} Ineligible for series points

=== ARCA Menards Series ===
(key) (Bold – Pole position awarded by qualifying time. Italics – Pole position earned by points standings or practice time. * – Most laps led.)

ARCA Menards Series results
| Year | Team | No. | Make | 1 | 2 | 3 | 4 | 5 | 6 | 7 | 8 | 9 | 10 | 11 | 12 | 13 | 14 | 15 | 16 | 17 | 18 | 19 | 20 | AMSC | Pts | Ref |
|---|---|---|---|---|---|---|---|---|---|---|---|---|---|---|---|---|---|---|---|---|---|---|---|---|---|---|
| 2023 | Pinnacle Racing Group | 28 | Chevy | DAY | PHO | TAL | KAN | CLT | BLN | ELK | MOH | IOW | POC | MCH | IRP | GLN | ISF | MLW | DSF | KAN; 2 | BRI | SLM | TOL | 69th | 42 | |
| 2024 | Pinnacle Racing Group | 82 | Chevy | DAY | PHO | TAL | DOV; 3 | KAN | CLT; 2* | IOW | MOH | BLN | IRP | SLM | ELK | MCH | ISF | MLW | DSF | GLN | BRI | KAN | TOL | 48th | 85 | |

==== ARCA Menards Series East ====
ARCA Menards Series East results
| Year | Team | No. | Make | 1 | 2 | 3 | 4 | 5 | 6 | 7 | 8 | AMSEC | Pts | Ref |
|---|---|---|---|---|---|---|---|---|---|---|---|---|---|---|
| 2021 | Cook-Finley Racing | 41 | Chevy | NSM; 14 | FIF; 11 | NSV; 11 | DOV | SNM | IOW | MLW | BRI | 20th | 96 | |
| 2024 | Pinnacle Racing Group | 82 | Chevy | FIF | DOV; 3 | NSV | FRS | IOW | IRP | MLW | BRI | 38th | 41 | |

=== CARS Late Model Stock Car Tour ===
(key) (Bold – Pole position awarded by qualifying time. Italics – Pole position earned by points standings or practice time. * – Most laps led. ** – All laps led.)

CARS Late Model Stock Car Tour results
| Year | Team | No. | Make | 1 | 2 | 3 | 4 | 5 | 6 | 7 | 8 | 9 | 10 | 11 | 12 | 13 | 14 | 15 | 16 | 17 | CLMSCTC | Pts | Ref |
|---|---|---|---|---|---|---|---|---|---|---|---|---|---|---|---|---|---|---|---|---|---|---|---|
| 2018 | Travis Kvapil Racing | 35 | Ford | TCM; 17 | MYB | ROU; 21 | HCY | BMS | ACE | CCS | KPT | HCY | WKS | ROU | SBO | | | | | | 40th | 28 | |
| 2019 | Travis Kvapil Racing | 35 | Ford | SNM | HCY | ROU; 22 | ACE | MMS | LGY | DOM | CCS | HCY | ROU | SBO | | | | | | | 59th | 11 | |
| 2021 | JR Motorsports | 8 | Chevy | DIL | HCY | ROU | ACE | CRW | LGY | DOM | HCY | MMS | TCM | FLC; 4* | WKS | SBO | | | | | 34th | 30 | |
| 2022 | JR Motorsports | 8 | Chevy | CRW; 1 | HCY; 2 | GPS; 3 | AAS; 4 | FCS; 1 | **LGY**; 2* | DOM; 15 | HCY; 4 | ACE; 4 | **MMS**; 2 | **NWS**; 1* | TCM; 4 | ACE | SBO; 1 | CRW; 3 | | | 1st | 432 | |
| 2023 | JR Motorsports | 8 | Chevy | **SNM**; 2 | FLC; 1 | **HCY**; 1* | **ACE**; 1** | NWS; 8 | LGY; 4 | DOM; 4 | CRW; 3* | | **ACE**; 1* | TCM; 2 | WKS; 1 | AAS; 5 | SBO; 5 | TCM; 10 | CRW; 11 | | 1st | 495 | |
| 2023 | JR Motorsports | 42 | Chevy | | | | | | | | | HCY; 4 | | | | | | | | | 1st | 495 | |
| 2024 | JR Motorsports | 8 | Chevy | SNM; 1 | HCY | AAS; 5 | OCS; 3 | ACE; 1 | TCM; 22 | LGY; 3 | DOM; 7 | CRW; 5* | HCY; 17 | NWS; 4 | ACE | WKS | FLC | SBO; 1 | TCM; 6 | **NWS**; 2* | 7th | 366 | |
| 2025 | Go Fas Racing | 32 | Chevy | AAS | WCS | CDL | OCS | ACE | NWS; 29 | LGY | DOM | CRW | HCY | AND | FLC | SBO | TCM | NWS | | | 98th | 13 | |
| 2026 | Go Fas Racing | 32 | Chevy | SNM | WCS | NSV | CRW | ACE | LGY | DOM | NWS; 6 | HCY | AND | FLC | TCM | NPS | SBO | | | | 54th | 36 | |

=== CARS Super Late Model Tour ===
(key)

CARS Super Late Model Tour results
| Year | Team | No. | Make | 1 | 2 | 3 | 4 | 5 | 6 | 7 | 8 | CSLMTC | Pts | Ref |
|---|---|---|---|---|---|---|---|---|---|---|---|---|---|---|
| 2019 | GMS Racing | 35 | Chevy | SNM | HCY | NSH | MMS | BRI | HCY; 9 | | | 12th | 78 | |
| 2019 | GMS Racing | 21 | Chevy | | | | | | | ROU; 10 | | 12th | 78 | |
| 2019 | Travis Kvapil Racing | 35 | Toyota | | | | | | | | SBO; 2 | 12th | 78 | |
| 2020 | Travis Kvapil Racing | 35 | Chevy | SNM; 5 | HCY; 4 | JEN; 12 | HCY; 4 | FCS; 6 | BRI | FLC; 9 | NSH; 27 | 5th | 164 | |
| 2021 | Travis Kvapil Racing | 35 | Chevy | **HCY**; 1 | GPS; 2* | **NSH**; 1** | JEN; 17* | HCY; 4 | MMS; 1* | TCM; 6 | **SBO**; 1** | 1st | 253 | |

=== CARS Pro Late Model Tour ===
(key)

CARS Pro Late Model Tour results
| Year | Team | No. | Make | 1 | 2 | 3 | 4 | 5 | 6 | 7 | 8 | 9 | 10 | 11 | 12 | 13 | CPLMTC | Pts | Ref |
|---|---|---|---|---|---|---|---|---|---|---|---|---|---|---|---|---|---|---|---|
| 2023 | Travis Kvapil Racing | 35 | Chevy | SNM | HCY | ACE | NWS | **TCM**; 1** | DIL | CRW | WKS | HCY | TCM | SBO | TCM | CRW | 36th | 37 | |
