= 2026 Focused Health 250 (Atlanta) =

NASCAR O'Reilly Auto Parts Series race at EchoPark Speedway

Race details
- Race 21 of 33 in the 2026 NASCAR O'Reilly Auto Parts Series
- Date: July 11, 2026
- Location: EchoPark Speedway in Hampton, Georgia
- Course: Permanent racing facility
- Course length: 1.54 miles (2.48 km)
- Distance: 172 laps, 264.88 mi (426.56 km)
- Scheduled distance: 163 laps, 251.02 mi (404.24 km)
- Average speed: 89.060 miles per hour (143.328 km/h)

Pole position
Driver	Sam Mayer	Haas Factory Team
- Time: 31.944

Most laps led
Driver	Sammy Smith	JR Motorsports
- Laps: 34

Fastest lap
Driver	Brandon Jones	Joe Gibbs Racing
- Time: 31.233

Winner
No. 7	Justin Allgaier	JR Motorsports

Television in the United States
- Network: The CW
- Announcers: Adam Alexander, Jamie McMurray, and Denny Hamlin
- Nielsen ratings: 1.011 million

Radio in the United States
- Radio: PRN
- Booth announcers: Brad Gillie and Nick Yeoman
- Turn announcers: Doug Turnbull (1 & 2) and Pat Patterson (3 & 4)

The 2026 Focused Health 250 was a NASCAR O'Reilly Auto Parts Series race held on Saturday, July 11, 2026, at EchoPark Speedway in Hampton, Georgia. Contested over 172 laps—extended from 163 laps due to a double overtime finish on the 1.54-mile-long (2.48 km) asphalt quad-oval intermediate speedway (with superspeedway rules), it was the 21st race of the 2026 NASCAR O'Reilly Auto Parts Series season, and the fifth and final running of the event.

In one of the most chaotic and wreck-filled races in history, which resulted in four red flags and a track-record of cautions, Justin Allgaier, driving for JR Motorsports, survived the crash fest, including a double overtime restart, taking the victory after the leaders of Brennan Poole and Nick Sanchez wrecked on the final lap. This was Allgaier's 34th career NASCAR O'Reilly Auto Parts Series win, and his sixth of the season. Carson Kvapil won the first stage, leading 29 laps, while Allgaier won the second stage, leading 15 laps. Despite 19 lead changes, Sammy Smith led the race-high 34 laps. At race's end, Kvapil finished second, and Parker Retzlaff finished third. William Sawalich and Anthony Alfredo rounded out the top five, while Garrett Smithley, Brandon Jones, Kyle Sieg, Rajah Caruth, and Jeremy Clements rounded out the top ten.

Following the race, Allgaier clinched the regular season championship three races early. Jesse Love would also clinch a spot in The Chase.

== Report ==
=== Background ===
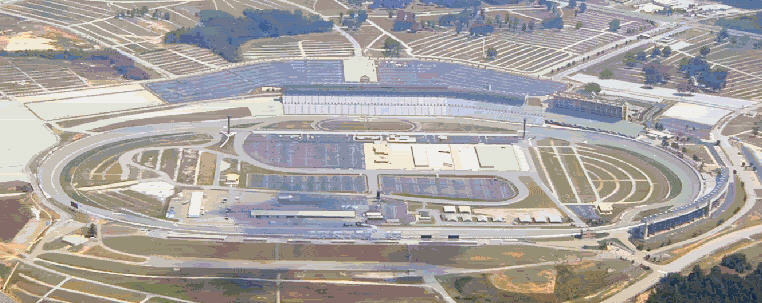
Atlanta Motor Speedway, the track where the race was held.

Atlanta Motor Speedway is a 1.54-mile race track in Hampton, Georgia, United States, 20 miles (32 km) south of Atlanta. It has annually hosted NASCAR O'Reilly Auto Parts Series stock car races since 1992.

The venue was bought by Speedway Motorsports in 1990. Then in 1994, a total of 46 condominiums were built over the northeastern side of the track. In 1997, to standardize the track with Speedway Motorsports' other two intermediate ovals, the entire track was almost completely rebuilt. The frontstretch and backstretch were swapped, and the configuration of the track was changed from oval to quad-oval, with a new official length of 1.54-mile (2.48 km) where before it was 1.522-mile (2.449 km). The project made the track one of the fastest on the NASCAR circuit. In July 2021 NASCAR announced that the track would be reprofiled for the 2022 season to have 28 degrees of banking and would be narrowed from 55 to 40 feet which the track claims will turn racing at the track similar to restrictor plate superspeedways. Despite the reprofiling being criticized by drivers, construction began in August 2021 and wrapped up in December 2021. The track has seating capacity of 71,000 to 125,000 people depending on the tracks configuration.

On June 3, 2025, SMI announced the track's renaming to EchoPark Speedway under a new seven-year sponsorship deal with the Smith family-owned business, EchoPark. The renaming ended a 35-year stint under the Atlanta Motor Speedway name.

==== Entry list ====
- (R) denotes rookie driver.
- (i) denotes driver who is ineligible for series driver points.

#	Driver	Team	Make
00	Sheldon Creed	Haas Factory Team	Chevrolet
0	Garrett Smithley	SS-Green Light Racing	Chevrolet
1	Carson Kvapil	JR Motorsports	Chevrolet
02	Ryan Ellis	Young's Motorsports	Chevrolet
2	Jesse Love	Richard Childress Racing	Chevrolet
7	Justin Allgaier	JR Motorsports	Chevrolet
8	Sammy Smith	JR Motorsports	Chevrolet
9	Jake Finch	JR Motorsports	Chevrolet
17	Corey Day	Hendrick Motorsports	Chevrolet
18	William Sawalich	Joe Gibbs Racing	Toyota
19	Brent Crews (R)	Joe Gibbs Racing	Toyota
20	Brandon Jones	Joe Gibbs Racing	Toyota
21	Austin Hill	Richard Childress Racing	Chevrolet
24	Harrison Burton	Sam Hunt Racing	Toyota
26	Dean Thompson	Sam Hunt Racing	Toyota
27	Jeb Burton	Jordan Anderson Racing	Chevrolet
28	Kyle Sieg	RSS Racing	Chevrolet
31	Blaine Perkins	Jordan Anderson Racing	Chevrolet
32	Jordan Anderson	Jordan Anderson Racing	Chevrolet
38	Logan Bearden	RSS Racing	Ford
39	Ryan Sieg	RSS Racing	Chevrolet
41	Sam Mayer	Haas Factory Team	Chevrolet
42	Nick Leitz (i)	Young's Motorsports	Chevrolet
44	Brennan Poole	Alpha Prime Racing	Chevrolet
45	Lavar Scott (R)	Alpha Prime Racing	Chevrolet
47	Carson Ware	Mike Harmon Racing	Chevrolet
48	Patrick Staropoli (R)	Big Machine Racing	Chevrolet
51	Jeremy Clements	Jeremy Clements Racing	Chevrolet
53	Glen Reen	Joey Gase Motorsports	Chevrolet
54	Taylor Gray	Joe Gibbs Racing	Toyota
55	Joey Gase	Joey Gase Motorsports	Ford
87	Nick Sanchez	Peterson Racing	Chevrolet
88	Rajah Caruth	JR Motorsports	Chevrolet
91	Mason Maggio	DGM Racing	Chevrolet
92	Leland Honeyman (i)	DGM Racing	Chevrolet
96	Anthony Alfredo	Viking Motorsports	Chevrolet
99	Parker Retzlaff	Viking Motorsports	Chevrolet
Official entry list

== Qualifying ==
Qualifying was held on Saturday, July 11, at 11:00 AM EST. Since EchoPark Speedway is an intermediate racetrack with superspeedway rules, the qualifying procedure used was a single-car, single-lap system with two rounds. In the first round, drivers had one lap to set a time and determined positions 11-38. The fastest ten drivers from the first round advanced to the second round, and whoever set the fastest time in Round 2 won the pole and determined the rest of the starting lineup.

Sam Mayer, driving for Haas Factory Team, qualified on pole position, having advanced from the preliminary round and set the fastest time in Round 2, with a lap of 31.944 seconds, and a speed of 173.554 miles per hour (279.308 km/h).

No drivers failed to qualify.

=== Qualifying results ===
Pos.	#	Driver	Team	Make	Time (R1)	Speed (R1)	Time (R2)	Speed (R2)
1	41	Sam Mayer	Haas Factory Team	Chevrolet	32.035	173.061	31.944	173.554
2	1	Carson Kvapil	JR Motorsports	Chevrolet	31.987	173.320	31.978	173.369
3	2	Jesse Love	Richard Childress Racing	Chevrolet	32.128	172.560	32.020	173.142
4	18	William Sawalich	Joe Gibbs Racing	Toyota	32.171	172.329	32.106	172.678
5	8	Sammy Smith	JR Motorsports	Chevrolet	32.117	172.619	32.119	172.608
6	00	Sheldon Creed	Haas Factory Team	Chevrolet	32.224	172.046	32.136	172.517
7	19	Brent Crews (R)	Joe Gibbs Racing	Toyota	32.279	171.753	32.155	172.415
8	88	Rajah Caruth	JR Motorsports	Chevrolet	32.238	171.971	32.194	172.206
9	54	Taylor Gray	Joe Gibbs Racing	Toyota	32.218	172.078	32.200	172.174
10	48	Patrick Staropoli (R)	Big Machine Racing	Chevrolet	32.268	171.811	32.302	171.630
Eliminated in Round 1
11	21	Austin Hill	Richard Childress Racing	Chevrolet	32.286	171.715	—	—
12	20	Brandon Jones	Joe Gibbs Racing	Toyota	32.315	171.561	—	—
13	17	Corey Day	Hendrick Motorsports	Chevrolet	32.327	171.498	—	—
14	51	Jeremy Clements	Jeremy Clements Racing	Chevrolet	32.335	171.455	—	—
15	9	Jake Finch	JR Motorsports	Chevrolet	32.336	171.450	—	—
16	7	Justin Allgaier	JR Motorsports	Chevrolet	32.379	171.222	—	—
17	96	Anthony Alfredo	Viking Motorsports	Chevrolet	32.393	171.148	—	—
18	87	Nick Sanchez	Peterson Racing	Chevrolet	32.400	171.111	—	—
19	39	Ryan Sieg	RSS Racing	Chevrolet	32.429	170.958	—	—
20	28	Kyle Sieg	RSS Racing	Chevrolet	32.459	170.800	—	—
21	27	Jeb Burton	Jordan Anderson Racing	Chevrolet	32.545	170.349	—	—
22	99	Parker Retzlaff	Viking Motorsports	Chevrolet	32.547	170.338	—	—
23	26	Dean Thompson	Sam Hunt Racing	Toyota	32.573	170.202	—	—
24	92	Leland Honeyman (i)	DGM Racing	Chevrolet	32.583	170.150	—	—
25	24	Harrison Burton	Sam Hunt Racing	Toyota	32.619	169.962	—	—
26	0	Garrett Smithley	SS-Green Light Racing	Chevrolet	32.709	169.495	—	—
27	02	Ryan Ellis	Young's Motorsports	Chevrolet	32.778	169.138	—	—
28	91	Mason Maggio	DGM Racing	Chevrolet	32.783	169.112	—	—
29	42	Nick Leitz (i)	Young's Motorsports	Chevrolet	32.857	168.731	—	—
30	44	Brennan Poole	Alpha Prime Racing	Chevrolet	32.862	168.705	—	—
31	53	Glen Reen	Joey Gase Motorsports	Chevrolet	32.884	168.593	—	—
32	45	Lavar Scott (R)	Alpha Prime Racing	Chevrolet	32.942	168.296	—	—
Qualified by owner's points
33	55	Joey Gase	Joey Gase Motorsports	Ford	32.946	168.275	—	—
34	07	Josh Bilicki	SS-Green Light Racing	Chevrolet	33.035	167.822	—	—
35	38	Logan Bearden	RSS Racing	Ford	33.619	164.907	—	—
36	47	Carson Ware	Mike Harmon Racing	Chevrolet	36.110	153.531	—	—
37	31	Blaine Perkins	Jordan Anderson Racing	Chevrolet	46.808	118.441	—	—
38	32	Jordan Anderson	Jordan Anderson Racing	Chevrolet	—	—	—	—
Official qualifying results
Official starting lineup

== Race ==
=== Race results ===
==== Stage Results ====
Stage One Laps: 45

Pos.	#	Driver	Team	Make	Pts
1	1	Carson Kvapil	JR Motorsports	Chevrolet	10
2	8	Sammy Smith	JR Motorsports	Chevrolet	9
3	2	Jesse Love	Richard Childress Racing	Chevrolet	8
4	88	Rajah Caruth	JR Motorsports	Chevrolet	7
5	00	Sheldon Creed	Haas Factory Team	Chevrolet	6
6	51	Jeremy Clements	Jeremy Clements Racing	Chevrolet	5
7	17	Corey Day	Hendrick Motorsports	Chevrolet	4
8	7	Justin Allgaier	JR Motorsports	Chevrolet	3
9	18	William Sawalich	Joe Gibbs Racing	Toyota	2
10	26	Dean Thompson	Sam Hunt Racing	Toyota	1

Stage Two Laps: 45

Pos.	#	Driver	Team	Make	Pts
1	7	Justin Allgaier	JR Motorsports	Chevrolet	10
2	8	Sammy Smith	JR Motorsports	Chevrolet	9
3	88	Rajah Caruth	JR Motorsports	Chevrolet	8
4	1	Carson Kvapil	JR Motorsports	Chevrolet	7
5	17	Corey Day	Hendrick Motorsports	Chevrolet	6
6	51	Jeremy Clements	Jeremy Clements Racing	Chevrolet	5
7	2	Jesse Love	Richard Childress Racing	Chevrolet	4
8	99	Parker Retzlaff	Viking Motorsports	Chevrolet	3
9	00	Sheldon Creed	Haas Factory Team	Chevrolet	2
10	21	Austin Hill	Richard Childress Racing	Chevrolet	1

=== Final Stage Results ===
Stage Three Laps: 82

Fin	St	#	Driver	Team	Make	Laps	Led	Status	Pts
1	16	7	Justin Allgaier	JR Motorsports	Chevrolet	172	15	Running	68
2	2	1	Carson Kvapil	JR Motorsports	Chevrolet	172	29	Running	52
3	22	99	Parker Retzlaff	Viking Motorsports	Chevrolet	172	0	Running	37
4	4	18	William Sawalich	Joe Gibbs Racing	Toyota	172	0	Running	35
5	17	96	Anthony Alfredo	Viking Motorsports	Chevrolet	172	0	Running	32
6	26	0	Garrett Smithley	SS-Green Light Racing	Chevrolet	172	0	Running	31
7	12	20	Brandon Jones	Joe Gibbs Racing	Toyota	172	0	Running	31
8	20	28	Kyle Sieg	RSS Racing	Chevrolet	172	0	Running	29
9	8	88	Rajah Caruth	JR Motorsports	Chevrolet	172	18	Running	43
10	14	51	Jeremy Clements	Jeremy Clements Racing	Chevrolet	172	0	Running	37
11	28	91	Mason Maggio	DGM Racing	Chevrolet	172	0	Running	26
12	34	07	Josh Bilicki	SS-Green Light Racing	Chevrolet	172	0	Running	25
13	10	48	Patrick Staropoli (R)	Big Machine Racing	Chevrolet	172	0	Running	24
14	23	26	Dean Thompson	Sam Hunt Racing	Toyota	172	0	Running	24
15	31	53	Glen Reen	Joey Gase Motorsports	Chevrolet	172	0	Running	22
16	19	39	Ryan Sieg	RSS Racing	Chevrolet	172	0	Running	21
17	30	44	Brennan Poole	Alpha Prime Racing	Chevrolet	172	1	Running	20
18	5	8	Sammy Smith	JR Motorsports	Chevrolet	172	34	Running	37
19	18	87	Nick Sanchez	Peterson Racing	Chevrolet	171	0	Running	18
20	37	31	Blaine Perkins	Jordan Anderson Racing	Chevrolet	171	0	Running	17
21	32	45	Lavar Scott (R)	Alpha Prime Racing	Chevrolet	169	0	Running	16
22	11	21	Austin Hill	Richard Childress Racing	Chevrolet	159	7	Accident	16
23	27	02	Ryan Ellis	Young's Motorsports	Chevrolet	159	1	Accident	14
24	7	19	Brent Crews (R)	Joe Gibbs Racing	Toyota	153	5	Accident	13
25	6	00	Sheldon Creed	Haas Factory Team	Chevrolet	152	27	Accident	20
26	3	2	Jesse Love	Richard Childress Racing	Chevrolet	151	0	Accident	23
27	38	32	Jordan Anderson	Jordan Anderson Racing	Chevrolet	151	0	Accident	10
28	24	92	Leland Honeyman (i)	DGM Racing	Chevrolet	151	0	Accident	0
29	29	42	Nick Leitz (i)	Young's Motorsports	Chevrolet	151	0	Accident	0
30	15	9	Jake Finch	JR Motorsports	Chevrolet	143	0	Accident	7
31	1	41	Sam Mayer	Haas Factory Team	Chevrolet	119	33	Accident	6
32	13	17	Corey Day	Hendrick Motorsports	Chevrolet	112	0	Accident	15
33	9	54	Taylor Gray	Joe Gibbs Racing	Toyota	112	0	Accident	4
34	25	24	Harrison Burton	Sam Hunt Racing	Toyota	101	2	Engine	3
35	35	38	Logan Bearden	RSS Racing	Ford	69	0	Fuel Pump	2
36	36	47	Carson Ware	Mike Harmon Racing	Chevrolet	63	0	Suspension	1
37	33	55	Joey Gase	Joey Gase Motorsports	Ford	2	0	Engine	1
38	21	27	Jeb Burton	Jordan Anderson Racing	Chevrolet	0	0	Brakes	1
Official race results

=== Race statistics ===
- Lead changes: 19 among 11 different drivers
- Cautions/Laps: 13 for 76 laps
- Red flags: 4
- Time of race: 2 hours, 58 minutes and 27 seconds
- Average speed: 89.060 miles per hour (143.328 km/h)

== Standings after the race ==
Drivers' Championship standings

	Pos	Driver	Points
	1	Justin Allgaier	966
	2	Jesse Love	726 (–240)
1	3	Sheldon Creed	693 (–273)
1	4	Corey Day	689 (–277)
2	5	Carson Kvapil	682 (–284)
	6	Brandon Jones	664 (–302)
2	7	Austin Hill	659 (–307)
	8	Sammy Smith	639 (–327)
	9	Parker Retzlaff	593 (–373)
	10	Sam Mayer	555 (–411)
1	11	Brent Crews	540 (–426)
1	12	Taylor Gray	539 (–427)
Official driver's standings

Manufacturers' Championship standings

Pos	Manufacturer	Points
1	Chevrolet	1,094
2	Toyota	731 (–363)
3	Ford	192 (–902)

- Note: Only the first 12 positions are included for the driver standings.

Previous race: 2026 Cuervo 300	NASCAR O'Reilly Auto Parts Series; 2026 season	Next race: 2026 Pennzoil 250
