= Sam Hunt Racing =

NASCAR team

- Owner: Sam Hunt
- Principal: Allen Hart (Technical Dir.)
- Base: Mooresville, North Carolina
- Series: NASCAR O'Reilly Auto Parts Series
- Race drivers: 24. Blaine Perkins; 26. Sheldon Creed
- Manufacturer: Toyota
- Opened: 2013

Career
- Debut: NASCAR O'Reilly Auto Parts Series: 2019 Ford EcoBoost 300 (Homestead-Miami); K&N Pro Series East: 2013 DRIVE4COPD 150 (Bristol)
- Latest race: NASCAR O'Reilly Auto Parts Series: 2026 O'Reilly Auto Parts 300 (Homestead); K&N Pro Series East: 2019 General Tire 125 (Dover)
- Races competed: Total: 261; O'Reilly Auto Parts Series Series: 208; K&N Pro Series East: 53
- Drivers' Championships: Total: 0 O'Reilly Auto Parts Series Series: 0 K&N Pro Series East: 0
- Race victories: Total: 0 O'Reilly Auto Parts Series Series: 0 K&N Pro Series East: 0
- Pole positions: Total: 0 O'Reilly Auto Parts Series Series: 0 K&N Pro Series East: 0

Sam Hunt Racing (SHR) is an American professional stock car racing team that currently competes in the NASCAR O'Reilly Auto Parts Series, fielding the No. 24 Toyota Supra full-time for Blaine Perkins and the No. 26 Toyota Supra full-time for Sheldon Creed.

The team is currently based in Mooresville, North Carolina, although they have Virginia roots and their original shop was located in Chester, Virginia.

== History ==
The team, first known as DRIVE Technology, was founded in 2013 by Sam Hunt and Virginian Shayne Lockhart, a former NASCAR driver-turned crew chief. In 2013 they acquired assets from Joe Gibbs Racing's ARCA Menards Series East No. 18 team, which was closing down after the 2012 season. They kept using the No. 18. The team picked up sponsorship from the Denny Hamlin Foundation for most of the races.

At the end of 2019 Hunt announced the team would move up to the NASCAR Xfinity Series with their driver Colin Garrett in the season-finale at Homestead-Miami Speedway with Joe Gibbs Engines under the hood.

== O'Reilly Auto Parts Series ==
They started fielding the No. 26 in the NASCAR Xfinity Series in 2019 in the season finale at Homestead–Miami Speedway for Colin Garrett, he started 15th and would end up finishing 21st.

For the 2020 season, SHR formed a partnership with Toyota Racing Development in continuation with their partnership on engines with Joe Gibbs Engines.

In 2022, SHR began operating out of The Motorsports Group's former shop just up the road from the shop they had rented from Rette Jones Racing from 2020-2021 as well as forming a larger partnership with TRD on the technical side.

=== Car No. 24 history ===
==== Part-time (2021–2022) ====
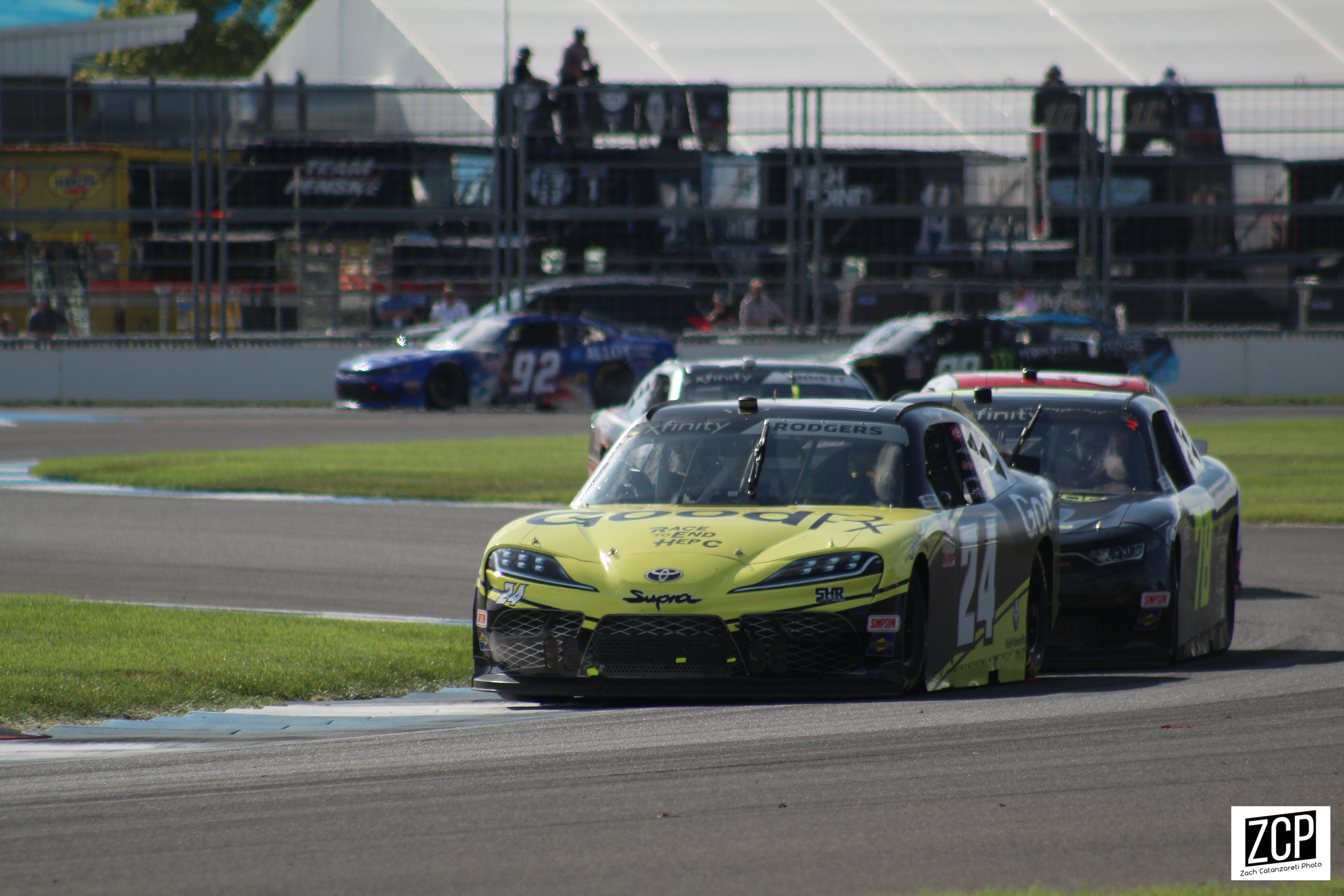
Will Rodgers at the Indy Road Course in 2021.

Starting at the Indy RC, SHR started fielding a second entry in the No. 24 for Will Rodgers with continued Partnership from GoodRx where he finished 28th after starting in ninth.

Jeffrey Earnhardt would drive the No. 24 at Daytona and would finish fifteenth. Joe Nemechek would attempt to race against his son John Hunter Nemechek however, due to qualifying being cancelled due to rain, the elder Nemechek did not qualify. He was originally entered for the Talladega race, but his entry was withdrawn because of the high chance of qualifying being rained out.

==== Connor Mosack and others (2023) ====
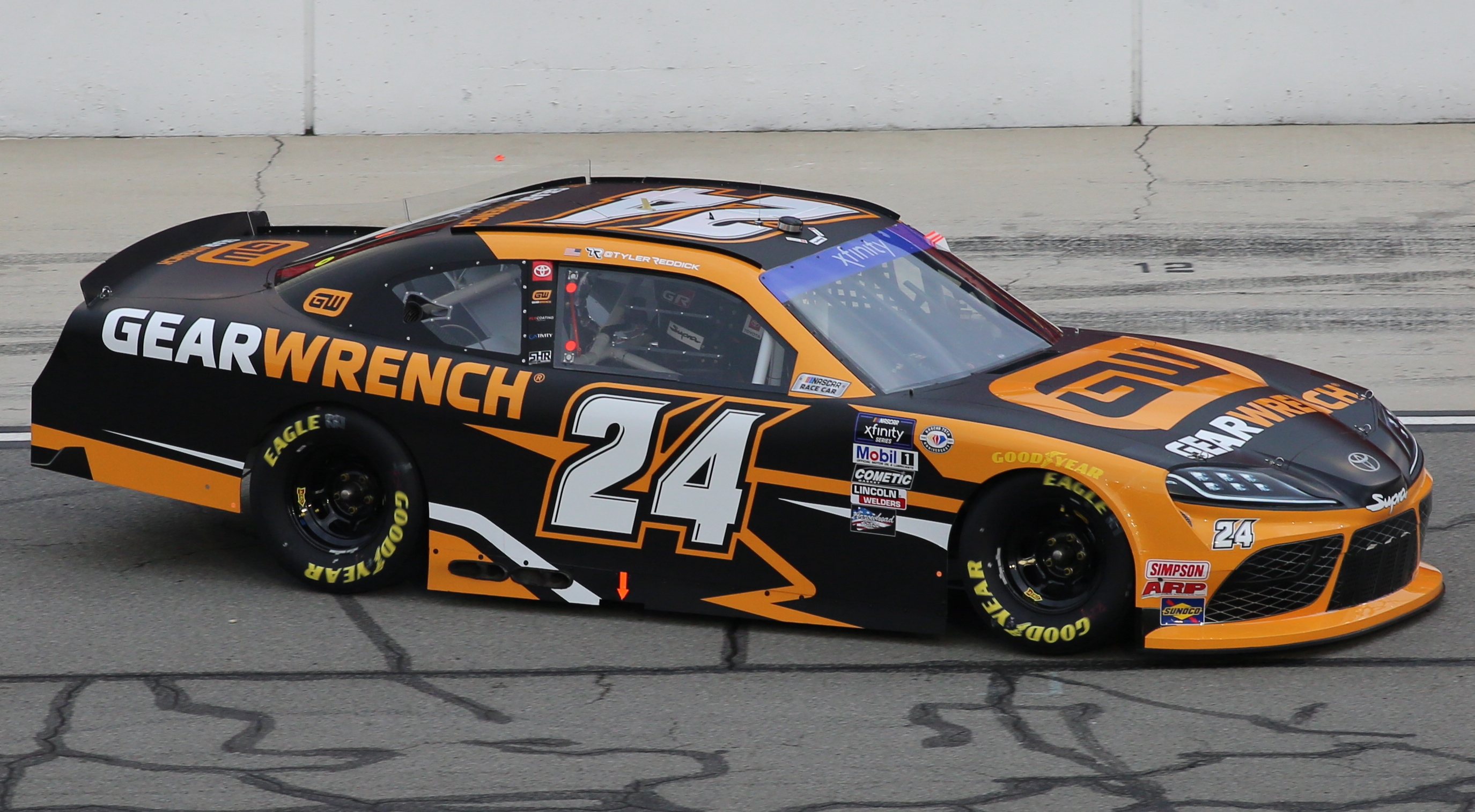
Tyler Reddick at Auto Club in 2023.

Connor Mosack would anchor the No. 24 for the 2023 season by driving in 22 races. Cup series driver Tyler Reddick and Truck Series driver Corey Heim, among others, would also drive in the car for the team.

==== Part-time (2024–2025) ====
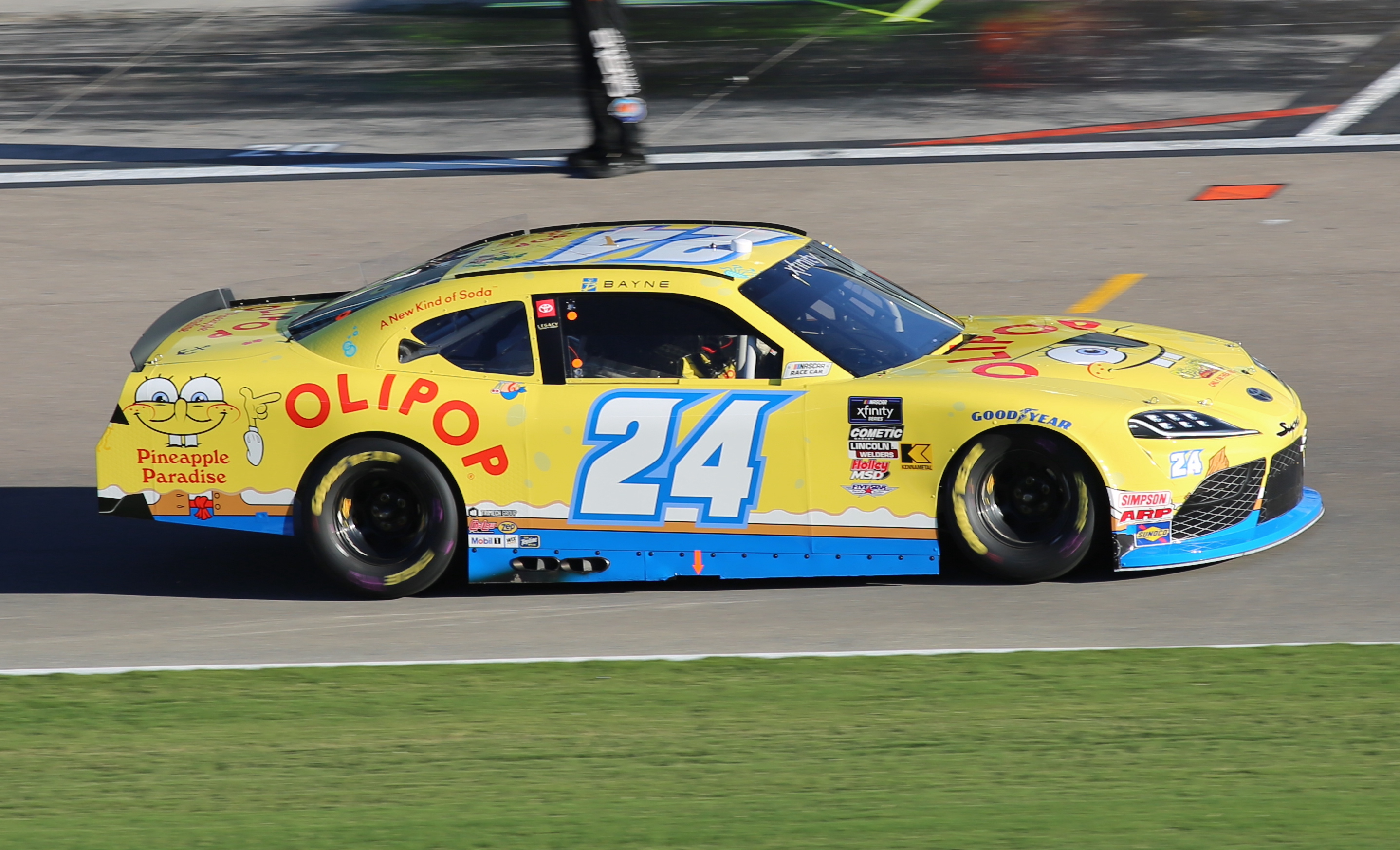
Trevor Bayne at Las Vegas in 2025.

The first race in 2024 that Sam Hunt Racing entered the No. 24 into was the race at COTA, with Ed Jones serving as driver. Ryan Truex was announced as the driver for the 2025 Daytona 300.

On February 23, 2025, it was announced that Corey Heim would drive the No. 24 part-time in 2025, with support from 23XI Racing.

Patrick Staropoli, Jeffrey Earnhardt, Christopher Bell, Kaz Grala, and Alon Day also competed for the team in 2025.

==== Harrison Burton (2026) ====
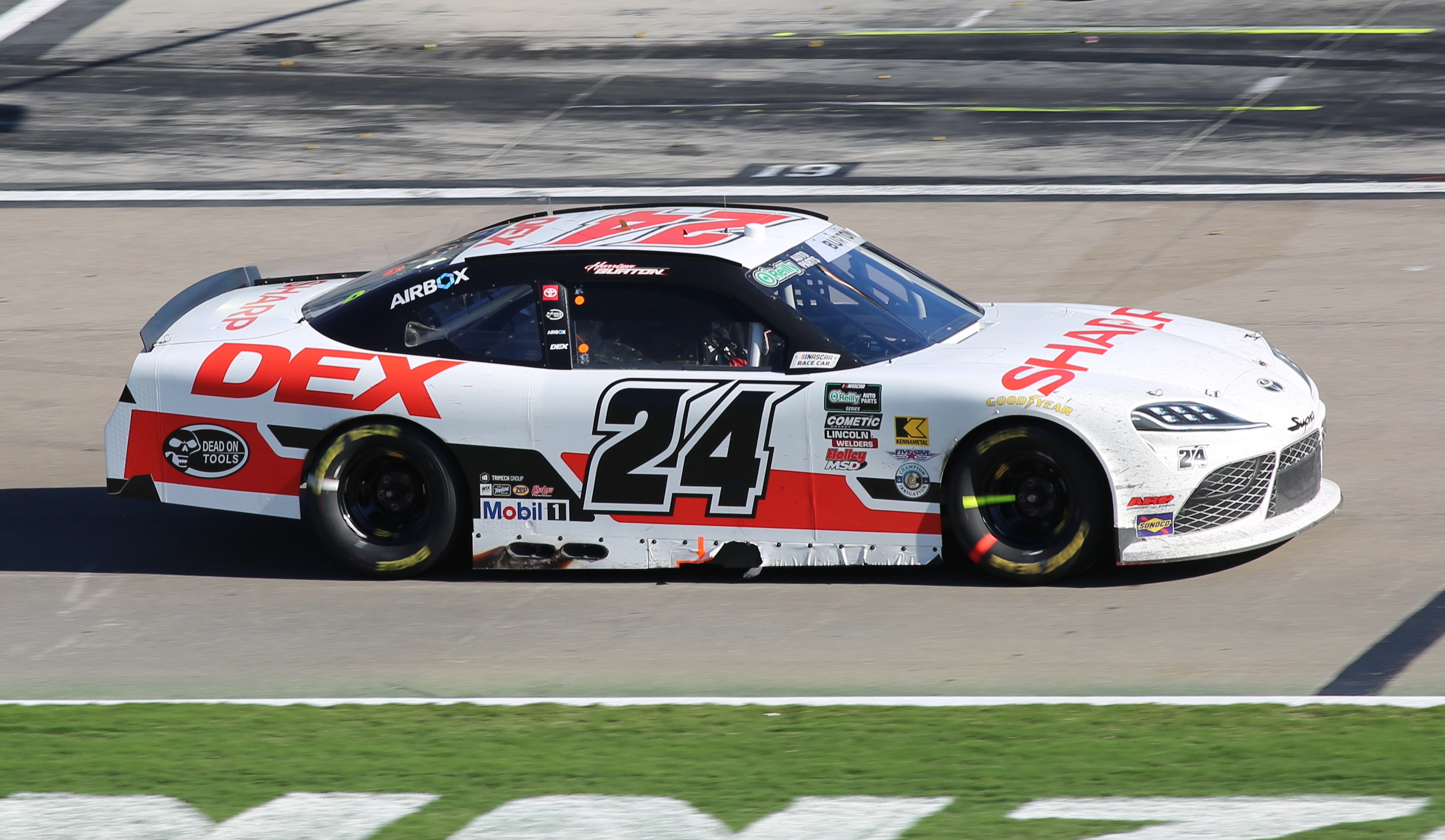
Harrison Burton in the No. 24 car at Las Vegas Motor Speedway in 2026

On October 25, 2025, Sam Hunt Racing announced that Harrison Burton will drive the No. 24 full-time in 2026.

==== Blaine Perkins (2027) ====
On October 13, 2026, it was announced that Blaine Perkins would drive the No. 24 full-time in 2027.

==== Car No. 24 results ====
Year	Driver	No.	Make	1	2	3	4	5	6	7	8	9	10	11	12	13	14	15	16	17	18	19	20	21	22	23	24	25	26	27	28	29	30	31	32	33	NXSC	Pts
2021	Will Rodgers	24	Toyota	DAY	DAY	HOM	LVS	PHO	ATL	MAR	TAL	DAR	DOV	COA	CLT	MOH	TEX	NSH	POC	ROA	ATL	NHA	GLN	IND; 28	MCH	DAY	DAR	RCH	BRI	LVS	TAL	CLT	TEX	KAN	MAR	PHO	47th	9
2022	Jeffrey Earnhardt	24	Toyota	DAY; 15	CAL	LVS	PHO	ATL	COA	RCH	MAR	TAL	DOV	DAR	TEX	CLT	PIR	NSH	ROA	ATL	NHA	POC	IND	MCH	GLN												47th	22
2022	Joe Nemechek	24	Toyota																							DAY; DNQ	DAR	KAN	BRI	TEX	TAL	CLT	LVS	HOM	MAR	PHO	47th	22
2023	Parker Chase	24	Toyota	DAY; 16								TAL; 38								ATL; 27											TEX; 16						25th	447
2023	Tyler Reddick	24	Toyota		CAL; 36	LVS; 13																															25th	447
2023	Connor Mosack	24	Toyota				PHO; 24	ATL; 30	COA; 19	RCH; 28	MAR; 33				CLT; 23	PIR; 8	SON; 32	NSH; 35	CSC; 35		NHA; 26			MCH; 36	IRC; 26	GLN; 5	DAY; 37		KAN; 14	BRI; 14		ROV; 24	LVS; 19	HOM; 31	MAR; 31	PHO; 34	25th	447
2023	Corey Heim	24	Toyota										DOV; 35	DAR; 10								POC; 37						DAR; 15									25th	447
2023	Sage Karam	24	Toyota																				ROA; 4														25th	447
2024	Ed Jones	24	Toyota	DAY	ATL	LVS	PHO	COA; 35	RCH	MAR	TEX	TAL	DOV	DAR	CLT	PIR; 5	SON	IOW	NHA	NSH	CSC	POC	IND	MCH	DAY	DAR	ATL	GLN	BRI	KAN	TAL	ROV	LVS	HOM	MAR	PHO	45th	35
2025	Ryan Truex	24	Toyota	DAY; 17	ATL																		DOV; 18	IND	IOW												36th	284
2025	Corey Heim	24	Toyota			COA; 31	PHO	LVS	HOM; 37			BRI; 8	CAR																								36th	284
2025	Patrick Staropoli	24	Toyota							MAR; 16	DAR									ATL; 35											KAN; 22				MAR; 17	PHO	36th	284
2025	Jeffrey Earnhardt	24	Toyota											TAL; 32	TEX	CLT	NSH; 19													BRI; 27							36th	284
2025	Christopher Bell	24	Toyota															MXC; 39	POC																		36th	284
2025	Kaz Grala	24	Toyota																		CSC; 22	SON				GLN; 11	DAY					ROV; 4					36th	284
2025	Alon Day	24	Toyota																									PIR; 20	GTW								36th	284
2025	Trevor Bayne	24	Toyota																														LVS; 22	TAL			36th	284
2026	Harrison Burton	24	Toyota	DAY; 29	ATL; 35	COA; 29	PHO; 23	LVS; 17	DAR; 22	MAR; 26	ROC; 13	BRI; 17	KAN; 28	TAL; 26	TEX; 22	GLN; 17	DOV; 16	CLT; 38	NSH; 27	POC; 11	COR; 9	SON; 18	CHI; 20	ATL; 38	IND; 18	IOW; 9	DAY; 8	DAR; 20	GTW; 35	BRI; 12	LVS; 14	CLT; 13	PHO; 13	TAL; 24	MAR; 12	HOM; 23	20th	571

=== Car No. 26 history ===
==== Part-time (2019–2020) ====
On October 28, 2019, the team announced that they would field an Xfinity team for the first time in 2020, the No. 26 Toyota, with Garrett driving. Brian Keselowski became the team's crew chief, moving over from the Brandonbilt Motorsports No. 68 car. They later attempted the season finale at Homestead in 2019, where they qualified fifteenth and finished twentieth in preparation for their 2020 schedule of races.

In 2020 Colin Garrett ran select races for the team with a best finish of fourteenth at Homestead-Miami in June of that year.

Brandon Gdovic would join the team for two races at the Indianapolis Road Course and Daytona Road Course finishing twelfth and 28th respectively.

On October 26, 2020, it was announced that TD2 driver Mason Diaz would drive the No. 26 Toyota for the final two races of the 2020 season at Martinsville and Phoenix.

==== Multiple drivers (2021–2022) ====
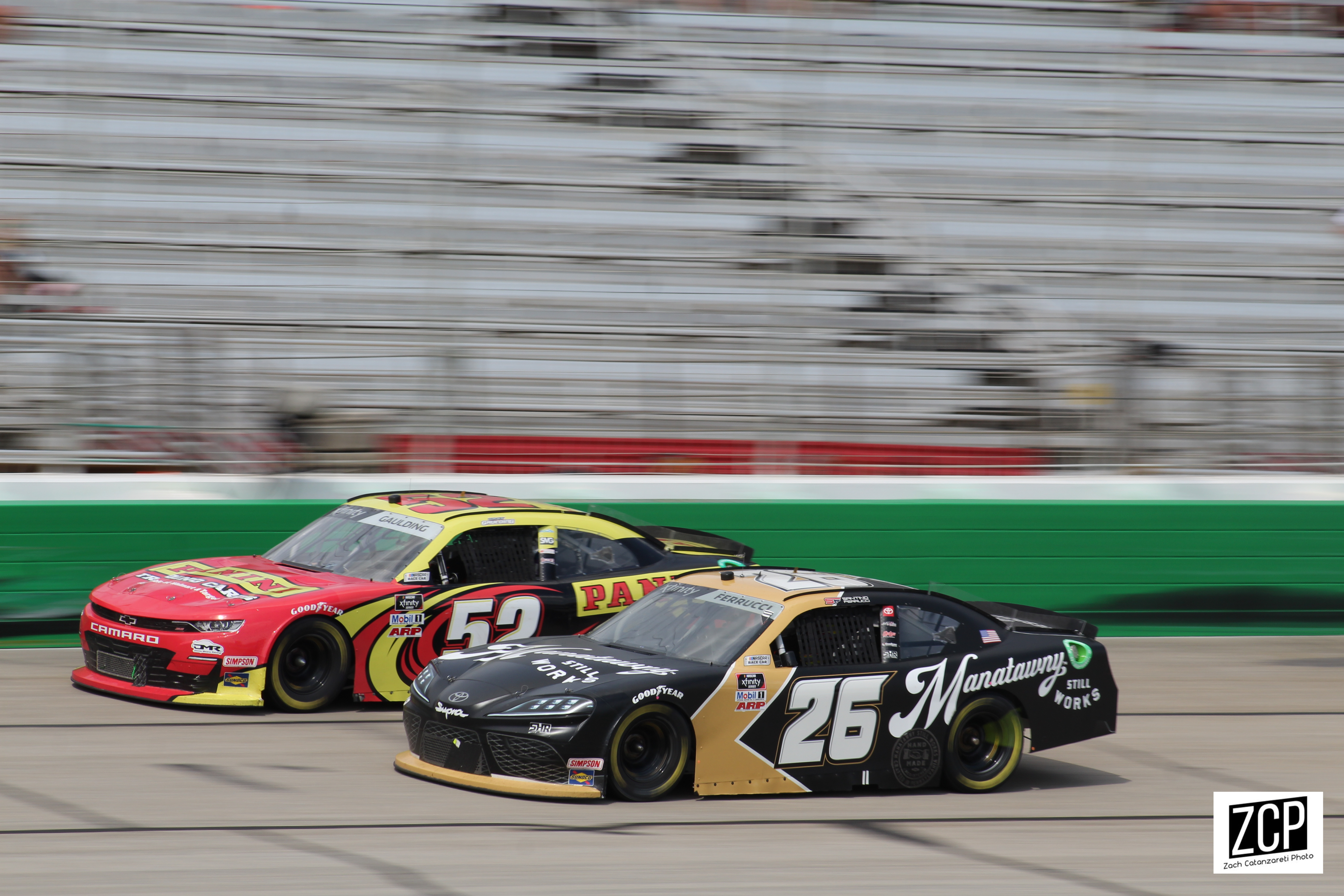
Santino Ferrucci in 2021.

In 2021 the team ran the full schedule with a huge rotation of drivers Brandon Gdovic, Kris Wright, Santino Ferrucci, Colin Garrett, John Hunter Nemechek. Grant Enfinger, Will Rodgers, and Dylan Lupton splitting the seat.

The team recorded their first ever top-ten with Brandon Gdovic at the season opener at Daytona.

In September at Richmond the team scored their first ever top-five with John Hunter Nemechek battling for the win in the closing laps with Justin Haley and eventual race winner Noah Gragson going on to score a 3rd-place finish.

On January 13, 2022 Ryan Truex was announced to drive the No. 26 at Daytona as well as several other races throughout the season and the next day Jeffrey Earnhardt was announced to compete in at least seven races bringing sponsorship from ForeverLawn.

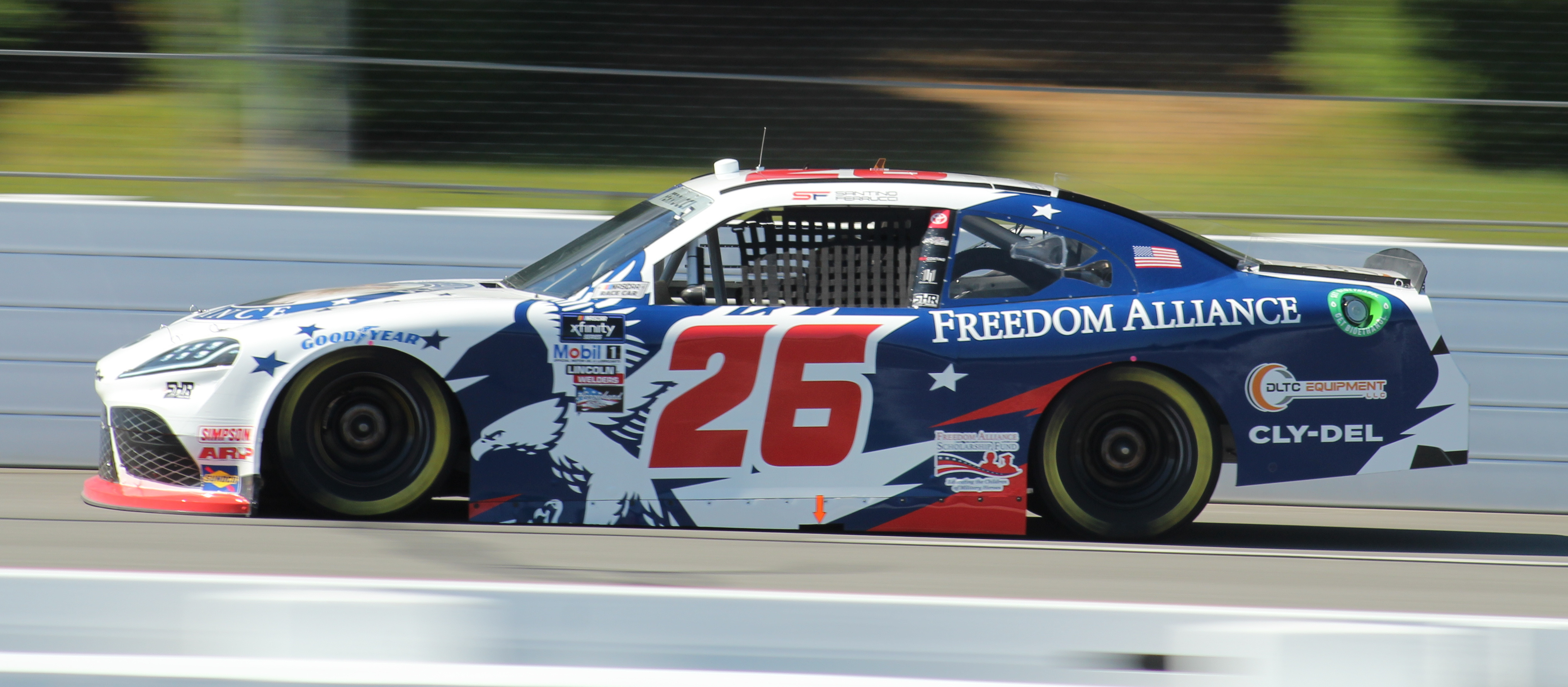
Ferrucci in 2022.

On January 25, 2022, it was announced John Hunter Nemechek would drive the car at both races at Las Vegas in the season with sponsorship from Berry's Bullets. Other drivers such as Parker Chase, Derek Griffith, and Chandler Smith would also drive the No. 26.

On October 27, 2022, it was announced that Kaz Grala would drive the car in the season finale at Phoenix Raceway on November 5, 2022, marking Grala's Toyota Racing debut. On December 8, the team announced that Grala would drive the No. 26 full-time for the 2023 season.

==== Kaz Grala (2023) ====
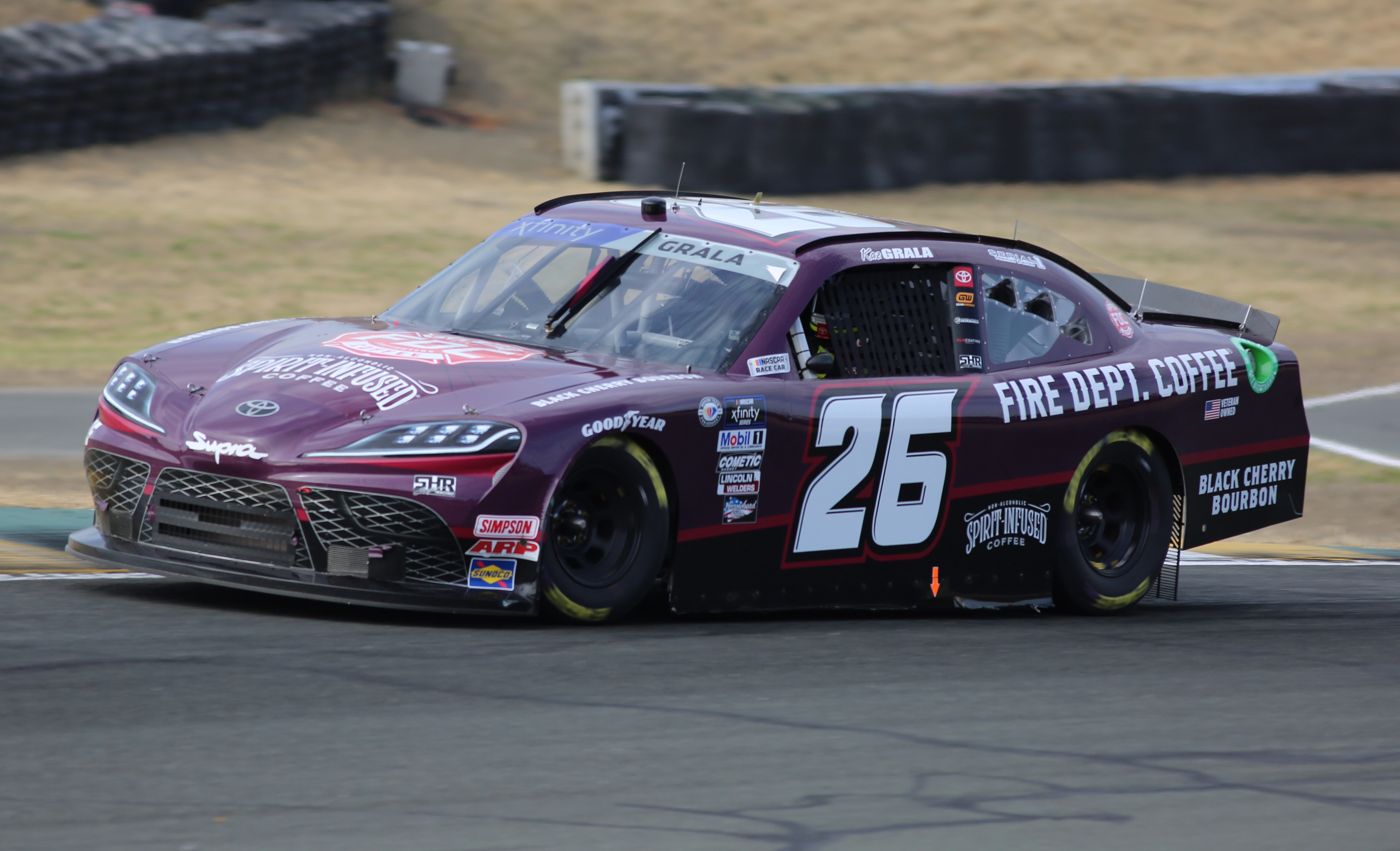
Kaz Grala at Sonoma in 2023.

Kaz Grala drove the No. 26 to two top-five finishes at Richmond and the Charlotte Roval, as well as nine top-ten finishes during the season. Grala finished the season seventeenth in points. In late November, SHR announced that Grala wouldn't be returning to the No. 26 Supra in 2024. No replacement driver(s) were announced at that point.

==== Multiple drivers (2024) ====
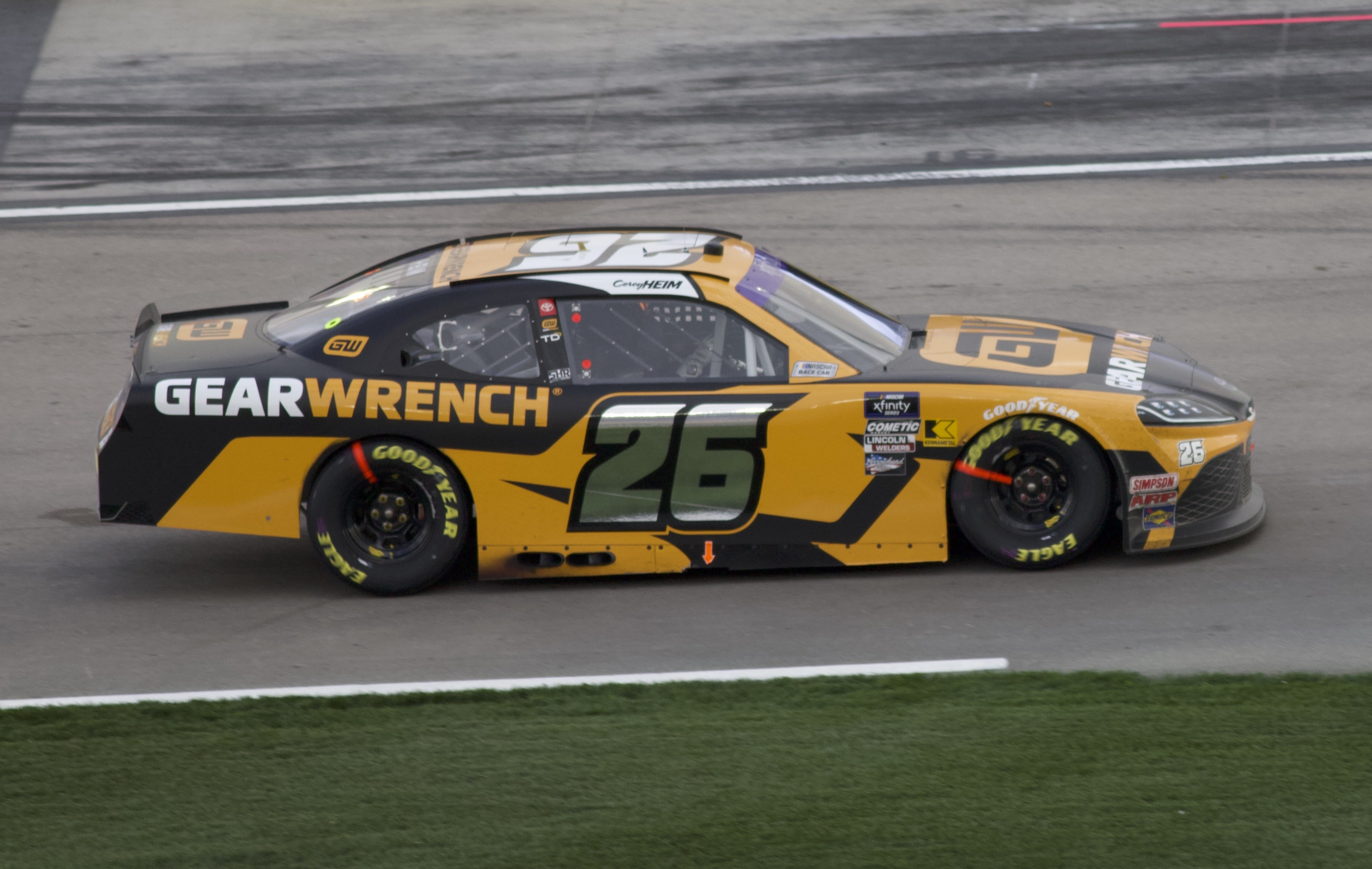
Corey Heim at Las Vegas Motor Speedway in 2024.

In January 2024, the team announced Corey Heim, Jeffrey Earnhardt, and Sage Karam, would be driving the No. 26 in multiple races throughout the season.

In May 2024, it was announced that Truck Series regular, Dean Thompson, would make his debut in the Xfinity Series at Charlotte's spring race.

==== Dean Thompson (2025–2026) ====
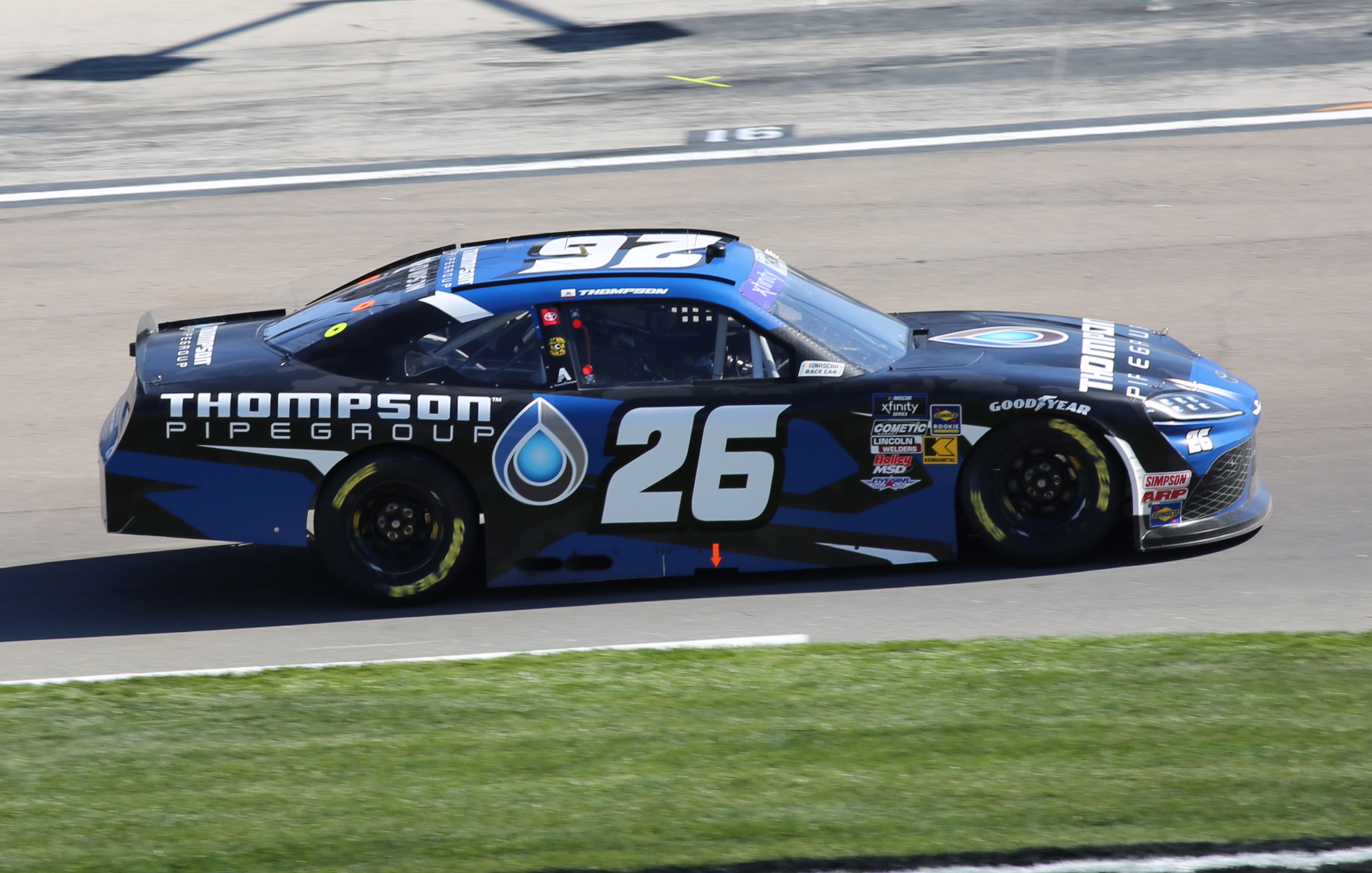
Dean Thompson's car for 2025.

On January 7, 2025, SHR announced that Dean Thompson would drive their No. 26 car full time for the 2025 Xfinity Series season. Thompson started out his rookie season well, with an eighth place result at Daytona. After several average finishes, Thompson scored his second top-ten finish at Martinsville, finishing sixth. Two weeks later, a third top-ten finish was scored at Bristol with a tenth place finish. Then next week at Rockingham, Thompson scored SHR's first ever stage win by winning the second stage, which was also the first stage win of his own career.

Thompson started his 2026 campaign with a 35th-place DNF at Daytona. On August 8, 2026, it was announced that Thompson will leave the team to join Haas Factory Team.

==== Sheldon Creed (2027–) ====
On October 3, 2026, it was announced that Sheldon Creed would drive their No. 26 full-time from 2027 onwards.

==== Car No. 26 results ====
Year	Driver	No.	Make	1	2	3	4	5	6	7	8	9	10	11	12	13	14	15	16	17	18	19	20	21	22	23	24	25	26	27	28	29	30	31	32	33	NXSC	Pts
2019	Colin Garrett	26	Toyota	DAY	ATL	LVS	PHO	CAL	TEX	BRI	RCH	TAL	DOV	CLT	POC	MCH	IOW	CHI	DAY	KEN	NHA	IOW	GLN	MOH	BRI	ROA	DAR	IND	LVS	RCH	CLT	DOV	KAN	TEX	PHO	HOM; 21	47th	16
2020	Colin Garrett	26	Toyota	DAY; DNQ	LVS	CAL	PHO	DAR; 37	CLT	BRI	ATL	HOM; 21	HOM; 14	TAL; 35	POC					KAN; 16	ROA																38th	127
2020	Brandon Gdovic	26	Toyota													IND; 12	KEN	KEN	TEX			DAY; 28	DOV	DOV	DAY	DAR	RCH	RCH	BRI	LVS	TAL	CLT	KAN	TEX			38th	127
2020	Mason Diaz	26	Toyota																																MAR; 20	PHO; 24	38th	127
2021	Brandon Gdovic	26	Toyota	DAY; 8						MAR; 17		DAR; 36					TEX; 23					NHA; 16							BRI; 21								23rd	485
2021	Kris Wright	26	Toyota		DAY; 18									COA; 32		MOH; 32				ROA; 25			GLN; 17	IND; 30													23rd	485
2021	Santino Ferrucci	26	Toyota			HOM; 30	LVS; 13	PHO; 15	ATL; 15										POC; 14		ATL; 33										TAL; 17						23rd	485
2021	Colin Garrett	26	Toyota								TAL; 15														MCH; 20	DAY; 37	DAR; 17								MAR; 14		23rd	485
2021	John Hunter Nemechek	26	Toyota										DOV; 32															RCH; 3									23rd	485
2021	Grant Enfinger	26	Toyota												CLT; 36																						23rd	485
2021	Will Rodgers	26	Toyota															NSH; 14														CLT; 29					23rd	485
2021	Dylan Lupton	26	Toyota																											LVS; 35			TEX; 38	KAN; 27		PHO; 15	23rd	485
2022	Ryan Truex	26	Toyota	DAY; 12																																	18th	624
2022	Jeffrey Earnhardt	26	Toyota		CAL; 29			ATL; 13							TEX; 19	CLT; 37		NSH; 7		ATL; 19									BRI; 12	TEX; 38							18th	624
2022	John Hunter Nemechek	26	Toyota			LVS; 12	PHO; 5							DAR; 4					ROA; 18					MCH; 19		DAY; 35	DAR; 9						LVS; 16				18th	624
2022	Parker Chase	26	Toyota						COA; 19								PIR; 27																				18th	624
2022	Derek Griffith	26	Toyota							RCH; 26	MAR; 21										NHA; 18							KAN; 27			TAL; 23				MAR; 15		18th	624
2022	Chandler Smith	26	Toyota									TAL; 38	DOV; 21																					HOM; 7			18th	624
2022	Santino Ferrucci	26	Toyota																			POC; 35	IND; 17														18th	624
2022	Connor Mosack	26	Toyota																						GLN; 15												18th	624
2022	Daniil Kvyat	26	Toyota																													CLT; 15					18th	624
2022	Kaz Grala	26	Toyota																																	PHO; 23	18th	624
2023	Kaz Grala	26	Toyota	DAY; 32	CAL; 13	LVS; 23	PHO; 34	ATL; 35	COA; 18	RCH; 4	MAR; 23	TAL; 24	DOV; 12	DAR; 9	CLT; 16	PIR; 26	SON; 20	NSH; 16	CSC; 10	ATL; 14	NHA; 13	POC; 25	ROA; 7	MCH; 21	IRC; 9	GLN; 28	DAY; 20	DAR; 28	KAN; 10	BRI; 10	TEX; 29	ROV; 5	LVS; 35	HOM; 30	MAR; 28	PHO; 10	19th	617
2024	Sage Karam	26	Toyota	DAY; 28				COA; 17								PIR; 34					CSC; 33																19th	537
2024	Jeffrey Earnhardt	26	Toyota		ATL; 8							TAL; 37												MCH; 21	DAY; 28				BRI; 35							PHO; 35	19th	537
2024	Corey Heim	26	Toyota			LVS; 13	PHO; 22		RCH; 4	MAR; 35	TEX; 17		DOV; 35					IOW; 3	NHA; 10			POC; 16				DAR; 25	ATL; 5			KAN; 31			LVS; 11				19th	537
2024	John Hunter Nemechek	26	Toyota											DAR; 23																							19th	537
2024	Dean Thompson	26	Toyota												CLT; 34																TAL; 20						19th	537
2024	Ed Jones	26	Toyota														SON; 15											GLN; 24				ROV; 37					19th	537
2024	Tyler Reddick	26	Toyota																	NSH; 14																	19th	537
2024	Conor Daly	26	Toyota																				IND; 14														19th	537
2024	Ryan Truex	26	Toyota																															HOM; 21			19th	537
2024	Bubba Pollard	26	Toyota																																MAR; 31		19th	537
2025	Dean Thompson	26	Toyota	DAY; 8	ATL; 35	COA; 18	PHO; 38	LVS; 15	HOM; 13	MAR; 6	DAR; 18	BRI; 10	CAR; 11	TAL; 18	TEX; 27	CLT; 5	NSH; 33	MXC; 12	POC; 17	ATL; 11	CSC; 14	SON; 18	DOV; 16	IND; 10	IOW; 31	GLN; 13	DAY; 7	PIR; 32	GTW; 16	BRI; 12	KAN; 10	ROV; 35	LVS; 28	TAL; 29	MAR; 8	PHO; 17	18th	690
2026	Dean Thompson	26	Toyota	DAY; 35	ATL; 11	COA; 26	PHO; 25	LVS; 31	DAR; 21	MAR; 7	ROC; 28	BRI; 24	KAN; 11	TAL; 6	TEX; 16	GLN; 35	DOV; 20	CLT; 14	NSH; 14	POC; 13	COR; 28	SON; 28	CHI; 17	ATL; 14	IND; 21	IOW; 8	DAY; 27	DAR; 11	GTW; 12	BRI; 9	LVS; 16	CLT; 14	PHO; 7	TAL; 8	MAR; 32	HOM; 33	18th	620

== K&N Pro Series ==
=== Car No. 18 history ===
==== 2013 ====
In 2013, Sam Hunt along with former-driver turned crew chief Shayne Lockhart formed DRIVE Technology after they had acquired assets from Joe Gibbs Racing's NASCAR K&N Pro Series East No. 18 team, which was closing down after the 2012 season. Sam Hunt, ran the full season, moving over from Precision Performance Motorsports. They kept using the No. 18. The team picked up sponsorship from the Denny Hamlin Foundation for most of the races. The team later ended up running only part-time, skipping the races at Five Flags, Winston-Salem, both Iowa races, and New Hampshire. Also, Sergio Peña drove the car at the season-finale at Road Atlanta instead of Hunt.

==== 2014 ====
In 2014, Hunt ran another part-time schedule. One of his races was set to be Daytona, but after full-time driver Brandon Jones failed to qualify in his own No. 33 car for Turner Scott Motorsports, he replaced Hunt in the No. 18. Other drivers for the team that year were Mason Massey in two races at the Langley and Columbus Speedways. Venezuelan female driver Milka Duno drove the No. 18 at the season-finale, now at Dover as a result of Road Atlanta being taken off the schedule.

==== 2015 ====
The team attempted fewer races in 2015. Peyton Sellers drove two races at Greenville-Pickens Speedway and at Dover. Full-time ARCA Series driver Sarah Cornett-Ching drove the car at Bristol in a partnership between DRIVE Technology and her ARCA team, RACE 101. Justin LaDuke made his only start of the year at Bowman Gray Stadium. Hunt returned for two races at tracks in his home state of Virginia: Langley and Richmond.

==== 2016 ====
The team continued to scale back in 2016, with Peña returning to the team for the first time in three years after he was released from Rev Racing. He ran the road course race at Virginia International Raceway, and it is his last NASCAR start to date. The team withdrew with Hunt at the next race at Dominion Raceway, another track in Virginia. Lockhart left the team in the end of the 2015 and Peyton Sellers become the new co-owner, the new team name became Hunt-Sellers Racing.

==== 2017 ====
Hunt and Peyton Sellers ran two races apiece that year.

==== 2018 ====
HSR ran nearly the full season in 2018, with yet another driver from Virginia, rookie Colin Garrett, running all but the first two races of the season. Garrett originally signed on for four races but extended it to the remainder of the schedule after strong initial runs. He finished tenth in points. His best finish was a third at the first of the doubleheader races at South Boston, his only top-five of the year. Garrett did score four top-tens as well. Clinton Cram served as crew chief in 2018.

==== 2019 ====
The team announced on January 17, 2019, that Garrett would return to the team, (now renamed as Sam Hunt Racing after Sellers departure) to run the full season with them in 2019. In addition, the team switched from Toyota to Chevrolet that year.

==== Car No. 18 results ====
Year	Driver	No.	Make	1	2	3	4	5	6	7	8	9	10	11	12	13	14	15	16	NKNPSEC	Pts
2013	Sam Hunt	18	Toyota	BRI; 32	GRE; 6	FIF	RCH; 18	BGS	IOW	LGY; 13	COL; 21	IOW	VIR; 20	GRE; 11	NHA	DOV; 18					
2013	Sergio Peña	18	Toyota														RAL; 14				
2014	Sam Hunt	18	Toyota	NSM; 28	DAY; INQ	BRI; 18	GRE; 26	RCH; 25	IOW	BGS; 14	FIF						VIR; 16	GRE; 19	DOV		
2014	Brandon Jones	18	Toyota		DAY; 24																
2014	Mason Massey	18	Toyota									LGY; 22	NHA	COL; 16	IOW	GLN					
2014	Milka Duno	18	Toyota																DOV; 20		
2015	Peyton Sellers	18	Toyota	NSM	GRE; 10												DOV; 18				
2015	Sarah Cornett-Ching	18	Toyota			BRI; 20	IOW														
2015	Justin LaDuke	18	Toyota					BGS; 18													
2015	Sam Hunt	18	Toyota						LGY; 21	COL	NHA	IOW	GLN	MOT	VIR	RCH; 16					
2016	Sergio Peña	18	Toyota	NSM	MOB	GRE	BRI	VIR; 12													
2016	Sam Hunt	18	Toyota						DOM; Wth	STA	COL	NHA	IOW	GLN	GRE	NJM	DOV				
2017	Sam Hunt	18	Toyota	NSM	GRE	BRI; 18									LGY; 9	NJM	DOV				
2017	Peyton Sellers	18	Toyota				SBO; 9	SBO; 8	MEM	BLN	TMP	NHA	IOW	GLN							
2018	Colin Garrett	18	Toyota	NSM	BRI	LGY; 6	SBO; 3	SBO; 16	MEM; 8	NJE; 8	TMP; 13	NHA; 13	IOW; 23	GLN; 22	GTW; 15	NHA; 7	DOV; 17				
2019	Colin Garrett	18	Chevy	NSM; 6*	BRI; 7	SBO; 6	SBO; 14	MEM; 11	NHA; 9	IOW; 13	GLN; 10	BRI; 15	GTW; 8	NHA							
2019	Sam Hunt	18	Chevy												DOV; 13						
