= 2025 Nu Way 200 =

26th race of the 2025 NASCAR Xfinity Series

2025 Nu Way 200 Sauced by Blues Hog
Race details
- Race 26 of 33 of the 2025 NASCAR Xfinity Series
- Date: September 6, 2025
- Location: World Wide Technology Raceway in Madison, Illinois
- Course: Permanent racing facility
- Course length: 1.25 miles (2.01 km)
- Distance: 160 laps, 200 mi (321 km)
- Scheduled distance: 160 laps, 200 mi (321 km)
- Average speed: 90.543 mph (145.715 km/h)

Pole position
Driver	Connor Zilisch	JR Motorsports
- Time: 32.935

Most laps led
Driver	Connor Zilisch	JR Motorsports
- Laps: 121

Winner
No. 88	Connor Zilisch	JR Motorsports

Television in the United States
- Network: The CW
- Announcers: Adam Alexander, Parker Kligerman, and Jamie McMurray

Radio in the United States
- Radio: MRN

The 2025 Nu Way 200 Sauced by Blues Hog was the 26th stock car race of the 2025 NASCAR Xfinity Series, the final race of the regular season, and the 1st iteration of the event after a fifteen-year absence of Xfinity racing at World Wide Technology Raceway. The race was held on Saturday, September 6, 2025, at World Wide Technology Raceway in Madison, Illinois, a 1.25 miles (2.01 km) permanent asphalt quad-oval shaped speedway. The race took the scheduled 160 laps to complete.

Connor Zilisch, driving for JR Motorsports, would continue his unstoppable season, winning the first stage and led a race-high 121 laps to earn his 10th career NASCAR Xfinity Series win, his ninth of the season, and his fourth consecutive win. He became the highest winning rookie driver in series history, and also became the third driver in series history to win four straight Xfinity Series races, alongside Sam Ard and Noah Gragson. To fill out the podium, William Sawalich, driving for Joe Gibbs Racing, and Christian Eckes, driving for Kaulig Racing, would finish 2nd and 3rd, respectively.

Following the race, Zilisch claimed the regular season championship. The 2025 playoff field was set; the 12 drivers that qualified were Zilisch, Justin Allgaier, Sam Mayer, Jesse Love, Brandon Jones, Sammy Smith, Nick Sanchez, Carson Kvapil, Taylor Gray, Sheldon Creed, Harrison Burton, and Austin Hill.

== Report ==
=== Background ===
World Wide Technology Raceway (formerly Gateway International Raceway and Gateway Motorsports Park) is a motorsport racing facility in Madison, Illinois, just east of St. Louis, Missouri, United States, close to the Gateway Arch. It features a 1.25-mile (2 kilometer) oval that hosts the NASCAR Cup Series, NASCAR Xfinity Series, and the NTT IndyCar Series, a 1.6-mile (2.6 km) infield road course used by the SCCA, Porsche Club of America, and various car clubs, and a quarter-mile drag strip that hosts the annual NHRA Midwest Nationals event. It previously hosted the NASCAR Craftsman Truck Series.

=== Entry list ===
- (R) denotes rookie driver.
- (i) denotes driver who is ineligible for series driver points.

#	Driver	Team	Make
00	Sheldon Creed	Haas Factory Team	Ford
1	Carson Kvapil (R)	JR Motorsports	Chevrolet
2	Jesse Love	Richard Childress Racing	Chevrolet
4	Parker Retzlaff	Alpha Prime Racing	Chevrolet
07	Nick Leitz	SS-Green Light Racing	Chevrolet
7	Justin Allgaier	JR Motorsports	Chevrolet
8	Sammy Smith	JR Motorsports	Chevrolet
10	Daniel Dye (R)	Kaulig Racing	Chevrolet
11	Daniel Hemric (i)	Kaulig Racing	Chevrolet
14	Garrett Smithley	SS-Green Light Racing	Chevrolet
16	Christian Eckes (R)	Kaulig Racing	Chevrolet
17	Corey Day	Hendrick Motorsports	Chevrolet
18	William Sawalich (R)	Joe Gibbs Racing	Toyota
19	Aric Almirola	Joe Gibbs Racing	Toyota
20	Brandon Jones	Joe Gibbs Racing	Toyota
21	Austin Hill	Richard Childress Racing	Chevrolet
25	Harrison Burton	AM Racing	Ford
26	Dean Thompson (R)	Sam Hunt Racing	Toyota
27	Jeb Burton	Jordan Anderson Racing	Chevrolet
28	Kyle Sieg	RSS Racing	Ford
31	Blaine Perkins	Jordan Anderson Racing	Chevrolet
32	Jordan Anderson	Jordan Anderson Racing	Chevrolet
35	Glen Reen	Joey Gase Motorsports	Toyota
39	Ryan Sieg	RSS Racing	Ford
41	Sam Mayer	Haas Factory Team	Ford
42	Anthony Alfredo	Young's Motorsports	Chevrolet
44	Brennan Poole	Alpha Prime Racing	Chevrolet
45	Lavar Scott	Alpha Prime Racing	Chevrolet
48	Nick Sanchez (R)	Big Machine Racing	Chevrolet
51	Jeremy Clements	Jeremy Clements Racing	Chevrolet
53	Joey Gase	Joey Gase Motorsports	Chevrolet
54	Taylor Gray (R)	Joe Gibbs Racing	Toyota
70	Thomas Annunziata	Cope Family Racing	Chevrolet
71	Ryan Ellis	DGM Racing	Chevrolet
76	Kole Raz	AM Racing	Ford
88	Connor Zilisch (R)	JR Motorsports	Chevrolet
91	Matt Mills (i)	DGM Racing	Chevrolet
99	Matt DiBenedetto	Viking Motorsports	Chevrolet
Official entry list

== Practice ==
The first and only practice was held on Friday, September 5, at 4:05 PM CST, and would last for 50 minutes. Sam Mayer, driving for Haas Factory Team, would set the fastest time in the session, with a lap of 33.375, and a speed of 134.831 mph (216.989 km/h).

Pos.	#	Driver	Team	Make	Time	Speed
1	41	Sam Mayer	Haas Factory Team	Ford	33.375	134.831
2	2	Jesse Love	Richard Childress Racing	Chevrolet	33.485	134.389
3	1	Carson Kvapil (R)	JR Motorsports	Chevrolet	33.520	134.248
Full practice results

== Qualifying ==
Qualifying was held on Saturday, September 6, at 2:00 PM CST. Since World Wide Technology Raceway is a 1.25 miles (2.01 km) oval, the qualifying system used is a single-car, one-lap system with only one round. Drivers will be on track by themselves and will have one lap to post a qualifying time, and whoever sets the fastest time will win the pole.

Connor Zilisch, driving for JR Motorsports, would score his fourth consecutive pole for the race, with a lap of 32.935, and a speed of 136.633 mph (219.889 km/h).

No drivers would fail to qualify.

=== Qualifying results ===
Pos.	#	Driver	Team	Make	Time	Speed
1	88	Connor Zilisch (R)	JR Motorsports	Chevrolet	32.935	136.633
2	48	Nick Sanchez (R)	Big Machine Racing	Chevrolet	32.962	136.521
3	18	William Sawalich (R)	Joe Gibbs Racing	Toyota	32.963	136.517
4	41	Sam Mayer	Haas Factory Team	Ford	32.981	136.442
5	54	Taylor Gray (R)	Joe Gibbs Racing	Toyota	33.033	136.227
6	25	Harrison Burton	AM Racing	Ford	33.061	136.112
7	19	Aric Almirola	Joe Gibbs Racing	Toyota	33.153	135.734
8	1	Carson Kvapil (R)	JR Motorsports	Chevrolet	33.157	135.718
9	21	Austin Hill	Richard Childress Racing	Chevrolet	33.191	135.579
10	16	Christian Eckes (R)	Kaulig Racing	Chevrolet	33.223	135.448
11	10	Daniel Dye (R)	Kaulig Racing	Chevrolet	33.247	135.351
12	20	Brandon Jones	Joe Gibbs Racing	Toyota	33.349	134.937
13	39	Ryan Sieg	RSS Racing	Ford	33.366	134.868
14	7	Justin Allgaier	JR Motorsports	Chevrolet	33.369	134.856
15	00	Sheldon Creed	Haas Factory Team	Ford	33.387	134.783
16	17	Corey Day	Hendrick Motorsports	Chevrolet	33.434	134.594
17	11	Daniel Hemric (i)	Kaulig Racing	Chevrolet	33.456	134.505
18	2	Jesse Love	Richard Childress Racing	Chevrolet	33.482	134.401
19	27	Jeb Burton	Jordan Anderson Racing	Chevrolet	33.520	134.248
20	28	Kyle Sieg	RSS Racing	Ford	33.570	134.048
21	42	Anthony Alfredo	Young's Motorsports	Chevrolet	33.634	133.793
22	8	Sammy Smith	JR Motorsports	Chevrolet	33.667	133.662
23	99	Matt DiBenedetto	Viking Motorsports	Chevrolet	33.761	133.290
24	76	Kole Raz	AM Racing	Ford	33.778	133.223
25	31	Blaine Perkins	Jordan Anderson Racing	Chevrolet	33.823	133.046
26	4	Parker Retzlaff	Alpha Prime Racing	Chevrolet	33.826	133.034
27	44	Brennan Poole	Alpha Prime Racing	Chevrolet	33.848	132.947
28	32	Jordan Anderson	Jordan Anderson Racing	Chevrolet	33.922	132.657
29	70	Thomas Annunziata	Cope Family Racing	Chevrolet	33.932	132.618
30	26	Dean Thompson (R)	Sam Hunt Racing	Toyota	33.977	132.443
31	51	Jeremy Clements	Jeremy Clements Racing	Chevrolet	33.999	132.357
32	71	Ryan Ellis	DGM Racing	Chevrolet	34.066	132.097
Qualified by owner's points
33	14	Garrett Smithley	SS-Green Light Racing	Chevrolet	34.069	132.085
34	07	Nick Leitz	SS-Green Light Racing	Chevrolet	34.075	132.062
35	35	Glen Reen	Joey Gase Motorsports	Toyota	34.157	131.745
36	45	Lavar Scott	Alpha Prime Racing	Chevrolet	34.282	131.264
37	91	Matt Mills (i)	DGM Racing	Chevrolet	34.321	131.115
38	53	Joey Gase	Joey Gase Motorsports	Chevrolet	34.884	128.999
Official qualifying results
Official starting lineup

== Race results ==
Stage 1 Laps: 35

Pos.	#	Driver	Team	Make	Pts
1	88	Connor Zilisch (R)	JR Motorsports	Chevrolet	10
2	19	Aric Almirola	Joe Gibbs Racing	Toyota	9
3	18	William Sawalich (R)	Joe Gibbs Racing	Toyota	8
4	7	Justin Allgaier	JR Motorsports	Chevrolet	7
5	48	Nick Sanchez (R)	Big Machine Racing	Chevrolet	6
6	41	Sam Mayer	Haas Factory Team	Ford	5
7	21	Austin Hill	Richard Childress Racing	Chevrolet	4
8	2	Jesse Love	Richard Childress Racing	Chevrolet	3
9	54	Taylor Gray (R)	Joe Gibbs Racing	Toyota	2
10	16	Christian Eckes (R)	Kaulig Racing	Chevrolet	1

Stage 2 Laps: 35

Pos.	#	Driver	Team	Make	Pts
1	7	Justin Allgaier	JR Motorsports	Chevrolet	10
2	19	Aric Almirola	Joe Gibbs Racing	Toyota	9
3	88	Connor Zilisch (R)	JR Motorsports	Chevrolet	8
4	18	William Sawalich (R)	Joe Gibbs Racing	Toyota	7
5	2	Jesse Love	Richard Childress Racing	Chevrolet	6
6	21	Austin Hill	Richard Childress Racing	Chevrolet	5
7	20	Brandon Jones	Joe Gibbs Racing	Toyota	4
8	16	Christian Eckes (R)	Kaulig Racing	Chevrolet	3
9	48	Nick Sanchez (R)	Big Machine Racing	Chevrolet	2
10	41	Sam Mayer	Haas Factory Team	Ford	1

Stage 3 Laps: 90

Fin	St	#	Driver	Team	Make	Laps	Led	Status	Pts
1	1	88	Connor Zilisch (R)	JR Motorsports	Chevrolet	160	121	Running	59
2	3	18	William Sawalich (R)	Joe Gibbs Racing	Toyota	160	7	Running	50
3	10	16	Christian Eckes (R)	Kaulig Racing	Chevrolet	160	0	Running	38
4	12	20	Brandon Jones	Joe Gibbs Racing	Toyota	160	0	Running	37
5	18	2	Jesse Love	Richard Childress Racing	Chevrolet	160	0	Running	41
6	7	19	Aric Almirola	Joe Gibbs Racing	Toyota	160	2	Running	49
7	17	11	Daniel Hemric (i)	Kaulig Racing	Chevrolet	160	0	Running	0
8	26	4	Parker Retzlaff	Alpha Prime Racing	Chevrolet	160	0	Running	29
9	16	17	Corey Day	Hendrick Motorsports	Chevrolet	160	0	Running	28
10	11	10	Daniel Dye (R)	Kaulig Racing	Chevrolet	160	0	Running	27
11	23	99	Matt DiBenedetto	Viking Motorsports	Chevrolet	160	0	Running	26
12	9	21	Austin Hill	Richard Childress Racing	Chevrolet	160	0	Running	34
13	21	42	Anthony Alfredo	Young's Motorsports	Chevrolet	160	0	Running	24
14	27	44	Brennan Poole	Alpha Prime Racing	Chevrolet	160	0	Running	23
15	31	51	Jeremy Clements	Jeremy Clements Racing	Chevrolet	160	0	Running	22
16	30	26	Dean Thompson (R)	Sam Hunt Racing	Toyota	160	0	Running	21
17	5	54	Taylor Gray (R)	Joe Gibbs Racing	Toyota	160	0	Running	22
18	32	71	Ryan Ellis	DGM Racing	Chevrolet	160	0	Running	19
19	36	45	Lavar Scott	Alpha Prime Racing	Chevrolet	160	0	Running	18
20	29	70	Thomas Annunziata	Cope Family Racing	Chevrolet	160	0	Running	17
21	37	91	Matt Mills (i)	DGM Racing	Chevrolet	160	0	Running	0
22	6	25	Harrison Burton	AM Racing	Ford	160	0	Running	15
23	25	31	Blaine Perkins	Jordan Anderson Racing	Chevrolet	160	0	Running	14
24	20	28	Kyle Sieg	RSS Racing	Ford	160	0	Running	13
25	2	48	Nick Sanchez (R)	Big Machine Racing	Chevrolet	160	0	Running	20
26	38	53	Joey Gase	Joey Gase Motorsports	Chevrolet	160	0	Running	11
27	13	39	Ryan Sieg	RSS Racing	Ford	160	0	Running	10
28	14	7	Justin Allgaier	JR Motorsports	Chevrolet	160	28	Running	26
29	34	07	Nick Leitz	SS-Green Light Racing	Chevrolet	160	2	Running	8
30	15	00	Sheldon Creed	Haas Factory Team	Ford	158	0	Running	7
31	35	35	Glen Reen	Joey Gase Motorsports	Toyota	158	0	Running	6
32	33	14	Garrett Smithley	SS-Green Light Racing	Chevrolet	158	0	Running	5
33	22	8	Sammy Smith	JR Motorsports	Chevrolet	157	0	Running	4
34	24	76	Kole Raz	AM Racing	Ford	145	0	Running	3
35	4	41	Sam Mayer	Haas Factory Team	Ford	134	0	Accident	8
36	19	27	Jeb Burton	Jordan Anderson Racing	Chevrolet	109	0	Accident	1
37	8	1	Carson Kvapil (R)	JR Motorsports	Chevrolet	38	0	Engine	1
38	28	32	Jordan Anderson	Jordan Anderson Racing	Chevrolet	33	0	Accident	1
Official race results

== Standings after the race ==
Drivers' Championship standings

	Pos	Driver	Points
	1	Connor Zilisch	2,064
	2	Justin Allgaier	2,035 (–29)
	3	Sam Mayer	2,016 (–48)
	4	Jesse Love	2,013 (–51)
2	5	Brandon Jones	2,013 (–51)
2	6	Sammy Smith	2,009 (–55)
5	7	Nick Sanchez	2,006 (–58)
2	8	Carson Kvapil	2,005 (–59)
1	9	Taylor Gray	2,005 (–59)
1	10	Sheldon Creed	2,003 (–61)
	11	Harrison Burton	2,002 (–62)
7	12	Austin Hill	2,000 (–64)
Official driver's standings

Manufacturers' Championship standings

Pos	Manufacturer	Points
1	Chevrolet	1,020
2	Toyota	841 (–179)
3	Ford	813 (–207)

- Note: Only the first 12 positions are included for the driver standings.

Previous race: 2025 Pacific Office Automation 147	NASCAR Xfinity Series; 2025 season	Next race: 2025 Food City 300
