= Dean Thompson (racing driver) =

American racing driver (born 2001)

- Thompson at Las Vegas Motor Speedway in 2026
- Born: Dean Kenneth Thompson; August 30, 2001 (age 25); Anaheim, California, U.S.

NASCAR O'Reilly Auto Parts Series career
- 68 races run over 3 years
- Car no., team: No. 00 (Haas Factory Team)
- 2026 position: 17th
- Best finish: 16th (2025)
- First race: 2024 BetMGM 300 (Charlotte)
- Last race: 2026 O'Reilly Auto Parts 300 (Homestead)
Wins	Top tens	Poles
0	14	0

NASCAR FedEx Freight Truck Series career
- 70 races run over 4 years
- 2024 position: 16th
- Best finish: 16th (2024)
- First race: 2021 Lucas Oil 150 (Phoenix)
- Last race: 2024 NASCAR Craftsman Truck Series Championship Race (Phoenix)
Wins	Top tens	Poles
0	11	0

ARCA Menards Series career
- 12 races run over 3 years
- Best finish: 24th (2023, 2024)
- First race: 2021 General Tire 150 (Phoenix)
- Last race: 2024 Bush's Beans 200 (Bristol)
Wins	Top tens	Poles
0	11	1

ARCA Menards Series East career
- 3 races run over 1 year
- Best finish: 21st (2024)
- First race: 2024 Circle City 200 (IRP)
- Last race: 2024 Bush's Beans 200 (Bristol)
Wins	Top tens	Poles
0	3	0

ARCA Menards Series West career
- 9 races run over 3 years
- Best finish: 13th (2021)
- First race: 2021 General Tire 150 (Phoenix)
- Last race: 2023 Desert Diamond Casino West Valley 100 (Phoenix)
Wins	Top tens	Poles
0	3	2
- Statistics up to date as of November 7, 2026.

Dean Kenneth Thompson (born August 30, 2001) is an American professional stock car racing driver. He currently competes full-time in the NASCAR O'Reilly Auto Parts Series, driving the No. 00 Chevrolet Camaro SS for Haas Factory Team. He has previously competed in the NASCAR Craftsman Truck Series, ARCA Menards Series, ARCA Menards Series East, and ARCA Menards Series West.

== Racing career ==
=== Early career ===
Thompson began racing at the age of five, racing quarter midgets at Orange Show Speedway. After taking a break from racing, he returned in 2018 to race late models at the age of 16. In 2019, he ran full-time in late models and got a win at Irwindale Speedway. In 2020 and 2021, he won the Irwindale Speedway LKQ Pick Your Part Late Model Championship with six wins and fourteen top-five finishes in 2020, and one win and thirteen top-fives in 2021. He also won rookie of the year in the Spears SRL Southwest Tour Series.

=== ARCA ===
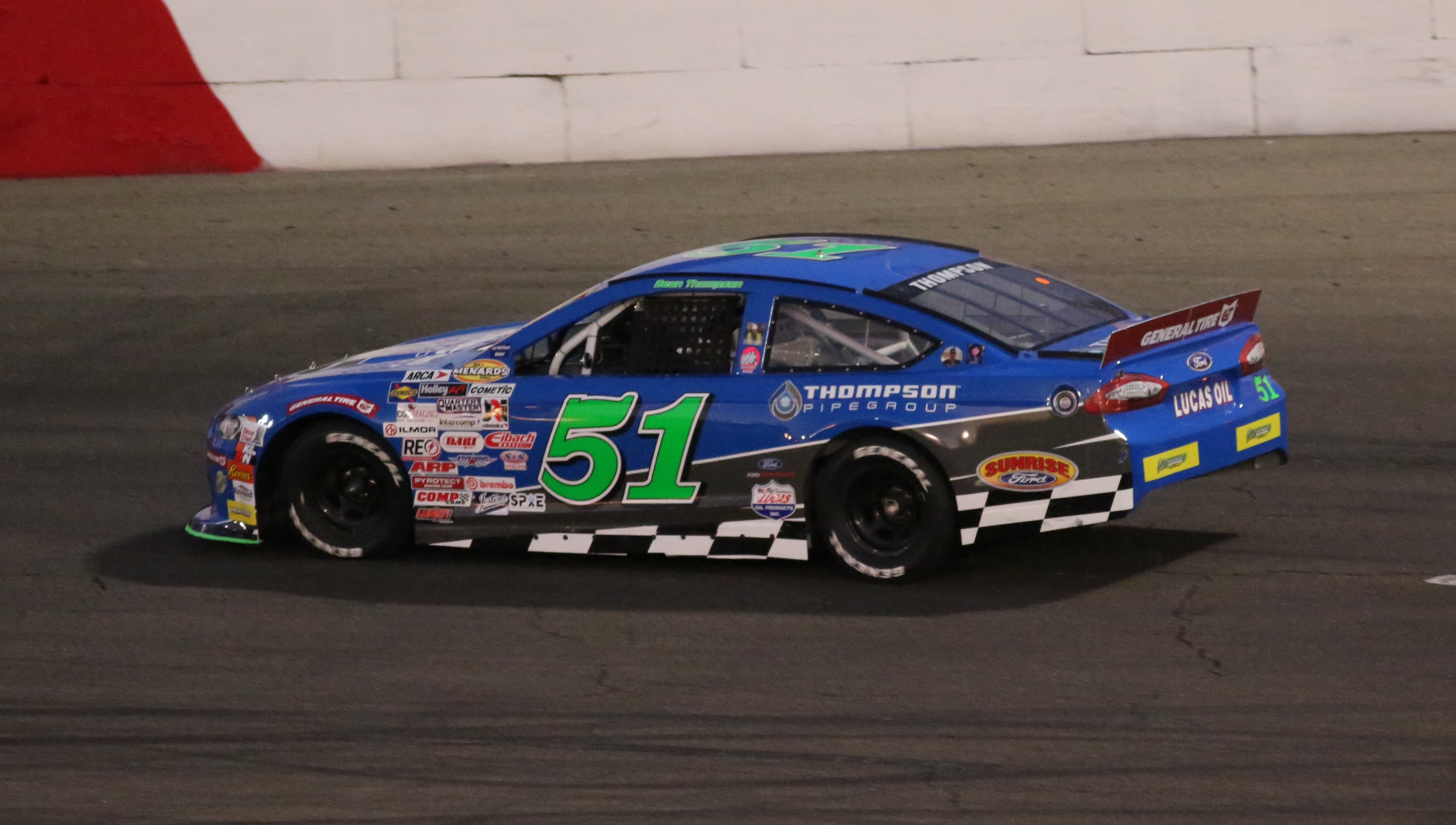
Thompson's car at All American Speedway in 2021

In 2021, Thompson moved up to the ARCA Menards Series West, driving full-time for High Point Racing, the team he drove for in the Spears Southwest Tour in 2020. HPR also formed an alliance with Sunrise Ford Racing to help their team, as it was their first time fielding a car in the West Series. Thompson's best finish was second at Irwindale Speedway, winning the pole and leading most of the race, only to get passed after a late restart. He finished the year with two poles, one top-five, and two top-ten finishes.

=== Truck Series ===
==== 2022 ====
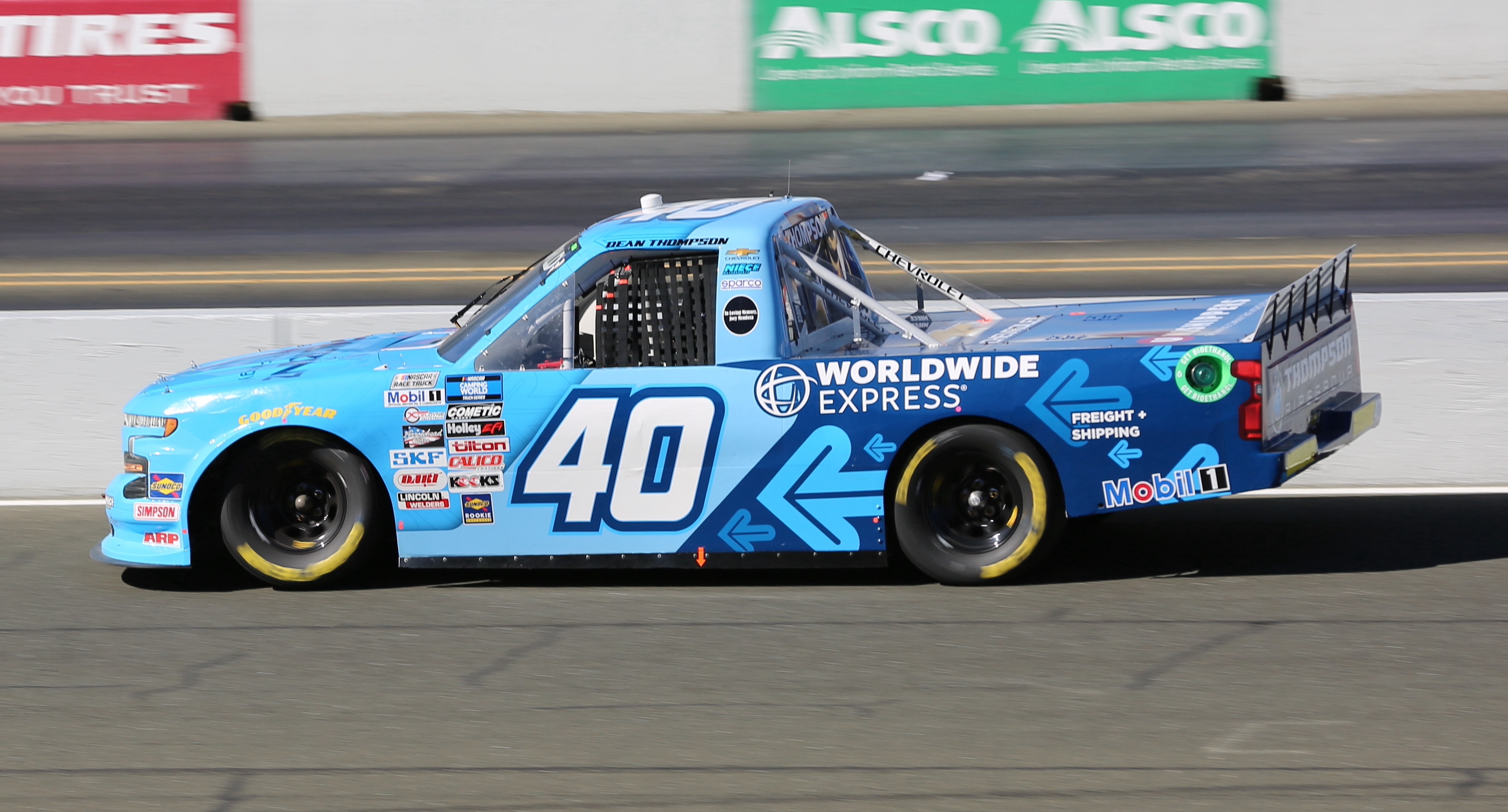
Thompson's No. 40 truck at Sonoma Raceway in 2022

On October 18, 2021, it was announced that Thompson would be driving for Niece Motorsports in the season-finale for the main ARCA Menards Series at Kansas Speedway as well as the NASCAR Camping World Truck Series season-finale at Phoenix Raceway. On November 2, Niece announced that Thompson would drive full-time for the team in the Truck Series in 2022. Although the team did not announce his number in that announcement, it was expected that he would continue to drive the No. 44, but with Kris Wright having been announced to drive the No. 44 full-time in 2022, Thompson would drive the No. 40 truck, replacing Ryan Truex.

==== 2023 ====
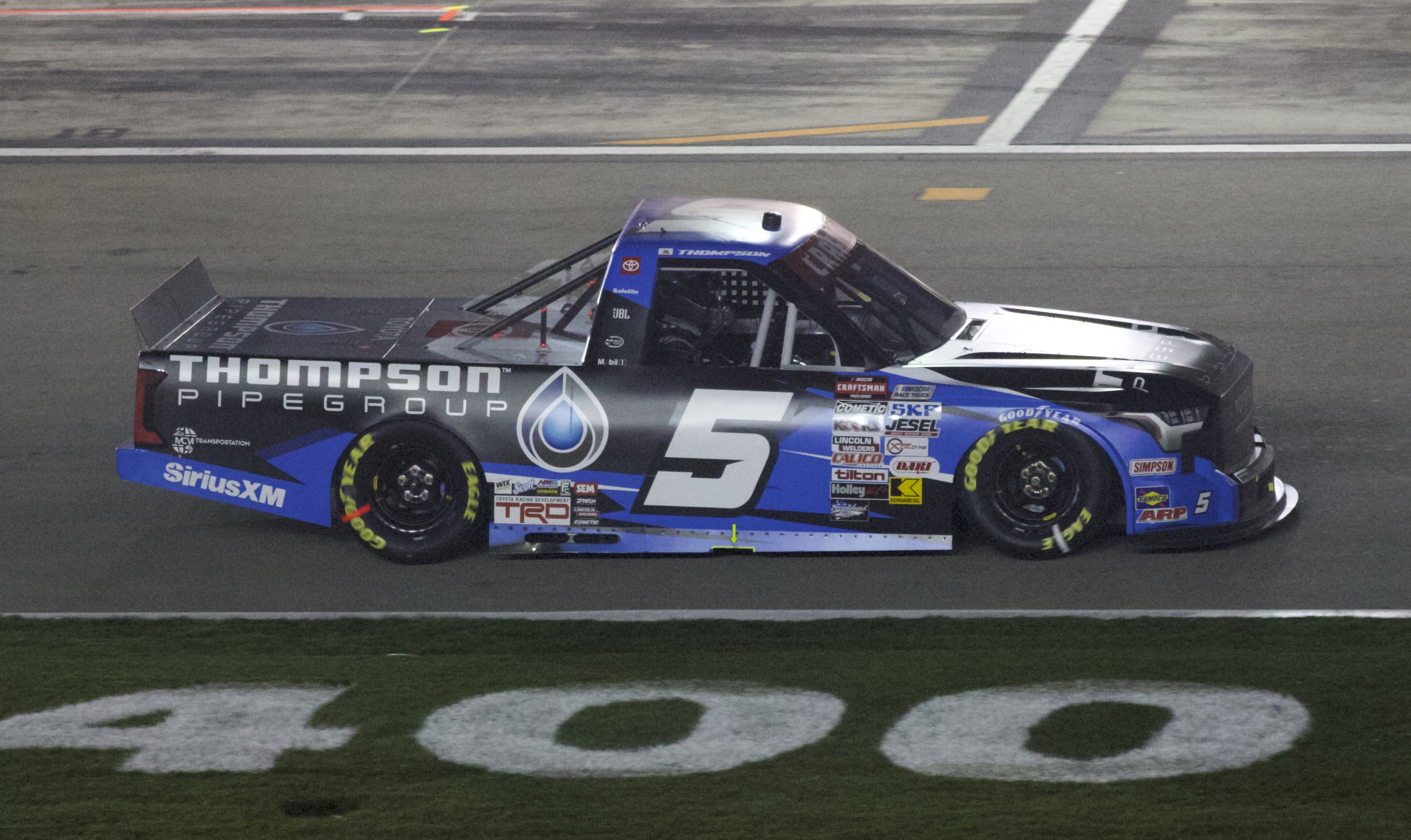
Thompson's No. 5 truck at Las Vegas Motor Speedway in 2024.

On December 5, 2022, Tricon Garage announced that Thompson will drive their No. 5 truck full-time in the 2023 season. On April 1, 2023, Thompson was injured in a scary crash at Texas Motor Speedway during the SpeedyCash.com 250. It would result in him being transported by ambulance on a stretcher.

==== 2024 ====
On November 17, it was announced that Thompson would return to Tricon Garage for the 2024 season.

=== O'Reilly Auto Parts Series ===
==== 2024 ====
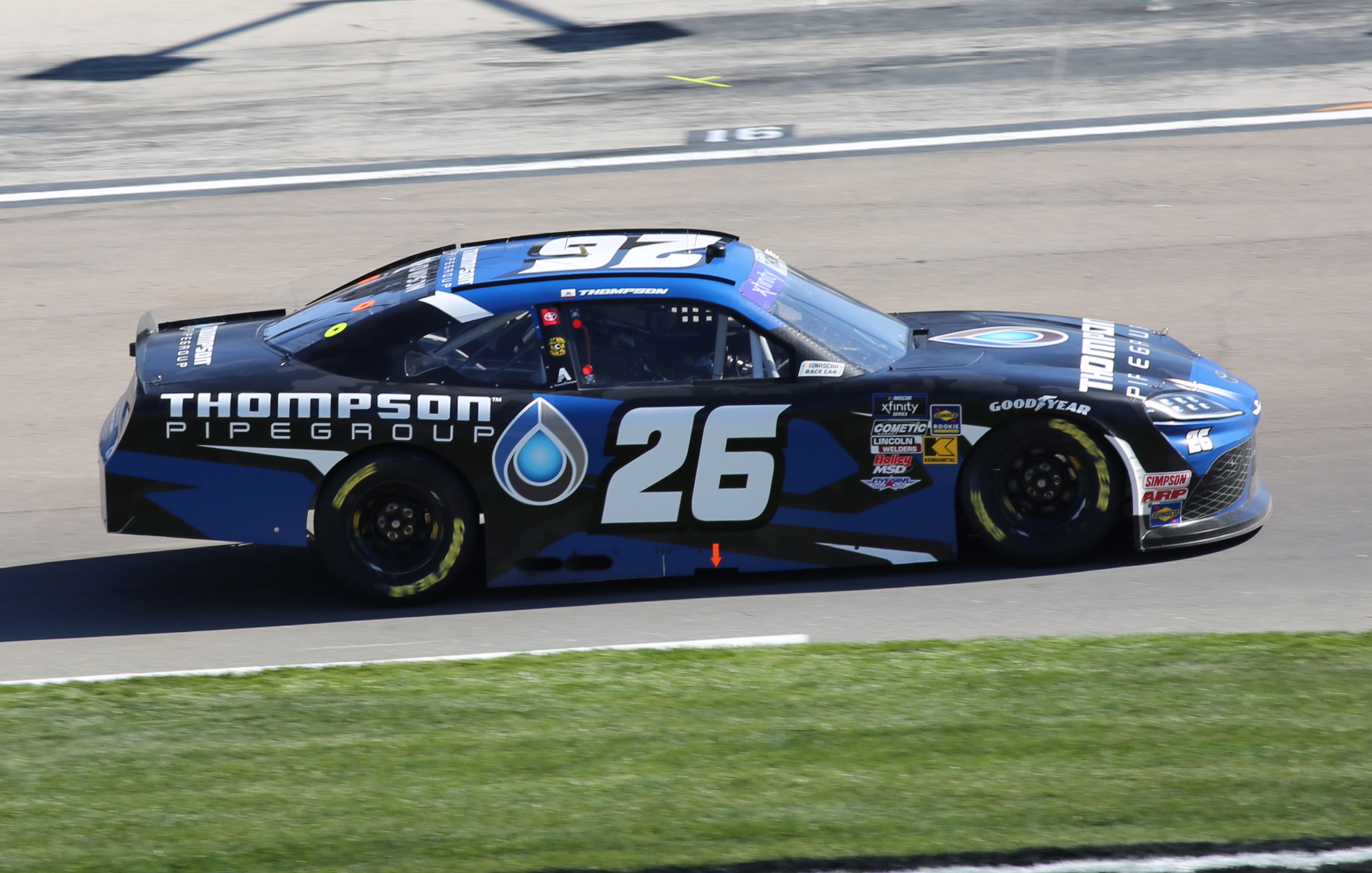
Thompson's No. 26 car at Las Vegas Motor Speedway in 2025.

In 2024, Thompson would make his NASCAR Xfinity Series debut at Charlotte, driving the No. 26 for Sam Hunt Racing. He made another start at Talladega late in the season, finishing 20th.

==== 2025 ====
On January 7, 2025, it was announced that Thompson would run full-time in the Xfinity Series for SHR in the 2025 season, driving the No. 26 car. He started the 2025 season with a eighth-place finish at Daytona. At Rockingham, Thompson scored the Stage 2 victory after flipping the stage on the pits, scoring the first career stage win for not only himself, but for his team, Sam Hunt Racing, as a whole. He finished the season 16th in points. He returned to SHR for 2026.

==== 2026 ====
Thompson started his 2026 campaign with a 35th-place DNF at Daytona.

==== 2027 ====
On August 8, 2026, it was announced that Thompson will join Haas Factory Team in their new car.

== Motorsports career results ==
=== Stock car career summary ===
Season	Series	Team	Races	Wins	Top 5	Top 10	Points	Position
2021	ARCA Menards Series West	High Point Racing	7	0	1	2	225	13th
2021	ARCA Menards Series	High Point Racing	1	0	0	0	65	56th
2021	ARCA Menards Series	Niece Motorsports	1	0	0	1	65	56th
2021	NASCAR Camping World Truck Series	Niece Motorsports	1	0	0	0	16	73rd
2022	ARCA Menards Series West	Niece Motorsports	1	0	0	0	29	59th
2022	NASCAR Camping World Truck Series	Niece Motorsports	23	0	0	0	279	23rd
2023	ARCA Menards Series West	Venturini Motorsports	1	0	1	1	42	39th
2023	ARCA Menards Series	Venturini Motorsports	5	0	3	5	199	24th
2023	NASCAR Craftsman Truck Series	Tricon Garage	23	0	2	5	370	20th
2024	ARCA Menards Series East	Venturini Motorsports	3	0	1	3	111	21st
2024	ARCA Menards Series	Venturini Motorsports	5	0	2	5	183	24th
2024	NASCAR Craftsman Truck Series	Tricon Garage	23	0	0	6	469	16th
2024	NASCAR Xfinity Series	Sam Hunt Racing	2	0	0	0	0	NC†
2025	NASCAR Xfinity Series	Sam Hunt Racing	33	0	1	8	690	16th
2026	NASCAR O'Reilly Auto Parts Series	Sam Hunt Racing	33	0	0	6	620	17th

^{†} As Thompson was a guest driver, he was ineligible for championship points.

=== NASCAR ===
(key) (Bold – Pole position awarded by qualifying time. Italics – Pole position earned by points standings or practice time. * – Most laps led.)

==== O'Reilly Auto Parts Series ====
NASCAR O'Reilly Auto Parts Series results
Year	Team	No.	Make	1	2	3	4	5	6	7	8	9	10	11	12	13	14	15	16	17	18	19	20	21	22	23	24	25	26	27	28	29	30	31	32	33	NOAPSC	Pts	Ref
2024	Sam Hunt Racing	26	Toyota	DAY	ATL	LVS	PHO	COA	RCH	MAR	TEX	TAL	DOV	DAR	CLT; 34	PIR	SON	IOW	NHA	NSH	CSC	POC	IND	MCH	DAY	DAR	ATL	GLN	BRI	KAN	TAL; 20	ROV	LVS	HOM	MAR	PHO	99th	0^{1}	
2025	Sam Hunt Racing	26	Toyota	DAY; 8	ATL; 35	COA; 18	PHO; 38	LVS; 15	HOM; 13	MAR; 6	DAR; 18	BRI; 10	CAR; 11	TAL; 18	TEX; 27	CLT; 5	NSH; 33	MXC; 12	POC; 17	ATL; 11	CSC; 14	SON; 18	DOV; 16	IND; 10	IOW; 31	GLN; 13	DAY; 7	PIR; 32	GTW; 16	BRI; 12	KAN; 10	ROV; 35	LVS; 28	TAL; 29	MAR; 8	PHO; 17	16th	690	
2026	Sam Hunt Racing	26	Toyota	DAY; 35	ATL; 11	COA; 26	PHO; 25	LVS; 31	DAR; 21	MAR; 7	CAR; 28	BRI; 24	KAN; 11	TAL; 6	TEX; 16	GLN; 35	DOV; 20	CLT; 14	NSH; 14	POC; 13	COR; 28	SON; 28	CHI; 17	ATL; 14	IND; 21	IOW; 8	DAY; 27	DAR; 11	GTW; 12	BRI; 9	LVS; 16	CLT; 14	PHO; 7	TAL; 8	MAR; 32	HOM; 33	17th	620	
2027	Haas Factory Team	00	Ford	DAY	ATL	COA	PHO	LVS	DAR	BRI	MAR	TAL	TEX	DOV	NWS	CLT	NSS	POC	CHI	IOW	SON	IND	COR	BRI	GTW	DAY	DAR	RCH	GLN	KAN	LVS	CLT	PHO	TAL	MAR	HOM			

==== Craftsman Truck Series ====
NASCAR Craftsman Truck Series results
Year	Team	No.	Make	1	2	3	4	5	6	7	8	9	10	11	12	13	14	15	16	17	18	19	20	21	22	23	NCTC	Pts	Ref
2021	Niece Motorsports	44	Chevy	DAY	DRC	LVS	ATL	BRD	RCH	KAN	DAR	COA	CLT	TEX	NSH	POC	KNX	GLN	GTW	DAR	BRI	LVS	TAL	MAR	PHO; 21		73rd	16	
2022	Niece Motorsports	40	Chevy	DAY; 36	LVS; 11	ATL; 34	COA; 29	MAR; 36	BRD; 16	DAR; 15	KAN; 22	TEX; 29	CLT; 28	GTW; 14	SON; 24	KNX; 23	NSH; 14	MOH; 27	POC; 24	IRP; 29	RCH; 35	KAN; 23	BRI; 32	TAL; 34	HOM; 23	PHO; 21	23rd	279	
2023	Tricon Garage	5	Toyota	DAY; 36	LVS; 16	ATL; 30	COA; 35	TEX; 28	BRD; 12	MAR; 21	KAN; 32	DAR; 9	NWS; 35	CLT; 3	GTW; 34	NSH; 33	MOH; 33	POC; 8	RCH; 25	IRP; 32	MLW; 15	KAN; 15	BRI; 35	TAL; 3	HOM; 16	PHO; 7	20th	370	
2024	Tricon Garage	5	Toyota	DAY; 24	ATL; 10	LVS; 30	BRI; 23	COA; 9	MAR; 33	TEX; 16	KAN; 8	DAR; 29	NWS; 27	CLT; 9	GTW; 14	NSH; 28	POC; 9	IRP; 9	RCH; 32	MLW; 19	BRI; 14	KAN; 13	TAL; 32	HOM; 15	MAR; 17	PHO; 15	16th	469	

^{*} Season still in progress
^{1} Ineligible for series points

=== ARCA Menards Series ===
(key) (Bold – Pole position awarded by qualifying time. Italics – Pole position earned by points standings or practice time. * – Most laps led.)

ARCA Menards Series results
Year	Team	No.	Make	1	2	3	4	5	6	7	8	9	10	11	12	13	14	15	16	17	18	19	20	AMSC	Pts	Ref
2021	High Point Racing	51	Ford	DAY	PHO; 15	TAL	KAN	TOL	CLT	MOH	POC	ELK	BLN	IOW	WIN	GLN	MCH	ISF	MLW	DSF	BRI	SLM		56th	65	
2021	Niece Motorsports	40	Chevy																				KAN; 8	56th	65	
2023	Venturini Motorsports	25	Toyota	DAY	PHO	TAL	KAN; 2													KAN; 8	BRI	SLM	TOL	24th	199	
2023	Venturini Motorsports	15	Toyota					CLT; 2	BLN	ELK			**POC**; 4	MCH	IRP	GLN	ISF	MLW	DSF					24th	199	
2023	Venturini Motorsports	55	Toyota								MOH; 10	IOW												24th	199	
2024	Venturini Motorsports	55	Toyota	DAY	PHO	TAL	DOV	KAN; 3					IRP; 9	SLM	ELK	MCH	ISF	MLW; 7	DSF	GLN	BRI; 5	KAN	TOL	24th	183	
2024	Venturini Motorsports	20	Toyota						CLT; 7	IOW	MOH	BLN												24th	183	

==== ARCA Menards Series East ====
ARCA Menards Series East results
Year	Team	No.	Make	1	2	3	4	5	6	7	8	AMSEC	Pts	Ref
2024	Venturini Motorsports	55	Toyota	FIF	DOV	NSV	FRS	IOW	IRP; 9	MLW; 7	BRI; 5	21st	111	

==== ARCA Menards Series West ====
ARCA Menards Series West results
Year	Team	No.	Make	1	2	3	4	5	6	7	8	9	10	11	12	AMSWC	Pts	Ref
2021	High Point Racing	51	Ford	PHO; 15	SON; 6	**IRW**; 2*	CNS; 11	IRW	PIR	LVS; 14	**AAS**; 17	PHO; 22				13th	225	
2022	Niece Motorsports	40	Chevy	PHO	IRW	KCR	PIR	SON; 15	IRW	EVG	PIR	AAS	LVS	PHO		59th	29	
2023	Venturini Motorsports	20	Toyota	PHO	IRW	KCR	PIR	SON	IRW	SHA	EVG	AAS	LVS	MAD	PHO; 2	39th	42	
