= 2025 Kansas Lottery 300 =

28th race of the 2025 NASCAR Xfinity Series

Race details
- Race 28 of 33 of the 2025 NASCAR Xfinity Series
- Date: September 27, 2025
- Location: Kansas Speedway in Kansas City, Kansas
- Course: Permanent racing facility
- Course length: 1.5 miles (2.4 km)
- Distance: 200 laps, 300 mi (482 km)
- Scheduled distance: 200 laps, 300 mi (482 km)
- Average speed: 127.992 mph (205.983 km/h)

Pole position
Driver	Brandon Jones	Joe Gibbs Racing
- Time: 31.140

Most laps led
Driver	Justin Allgaier	JR Motorsports
- Laps: 79

Winner
No. 20	Brandon Jones	Joe Gibbs Racing

Television in the United States
- Network: CW
- Announcers: Adam Alexander, Parker Kligerman, and Jamie McMurray

Radio in the United States
- Radio: MRN

The 2025 Kansas Lottery 300 was the 28th stock car race of the 2025 NASCAR Xfinity Series, the second race of the Round of 12, and the 25th iteration of the event. The race was held on Saturday, September 27, 2025, at Kansas Speedway in Kansas City, Kansas, a 1.5 miles (2.4 km) permanent asphalt quad-oval shaped intermediate speedway. The race took the scheduled 200 laps to complete.

Brandon Jones, driving for Joe Gibbs Racing, would take the lead late from Justin Allgaier, and led the final 37 laps to earn his seventh career NASCAR Xfinity Series win, and his second of the season. He would also advance into the next round of the playoffs. Allgaier and Connor Zilisch would also advance into the next round on points. To fill out the podium, Zilisch, driving for JR Motorsports, and Austin Hill, driving for Richard Childress Racing, would finish 2nd and 3rd, respectively. With Zilisch's 16th consecutive top five finish, he broke Sam Ard's 1983 record with the most in series history.

== Report ==
=== Background ===
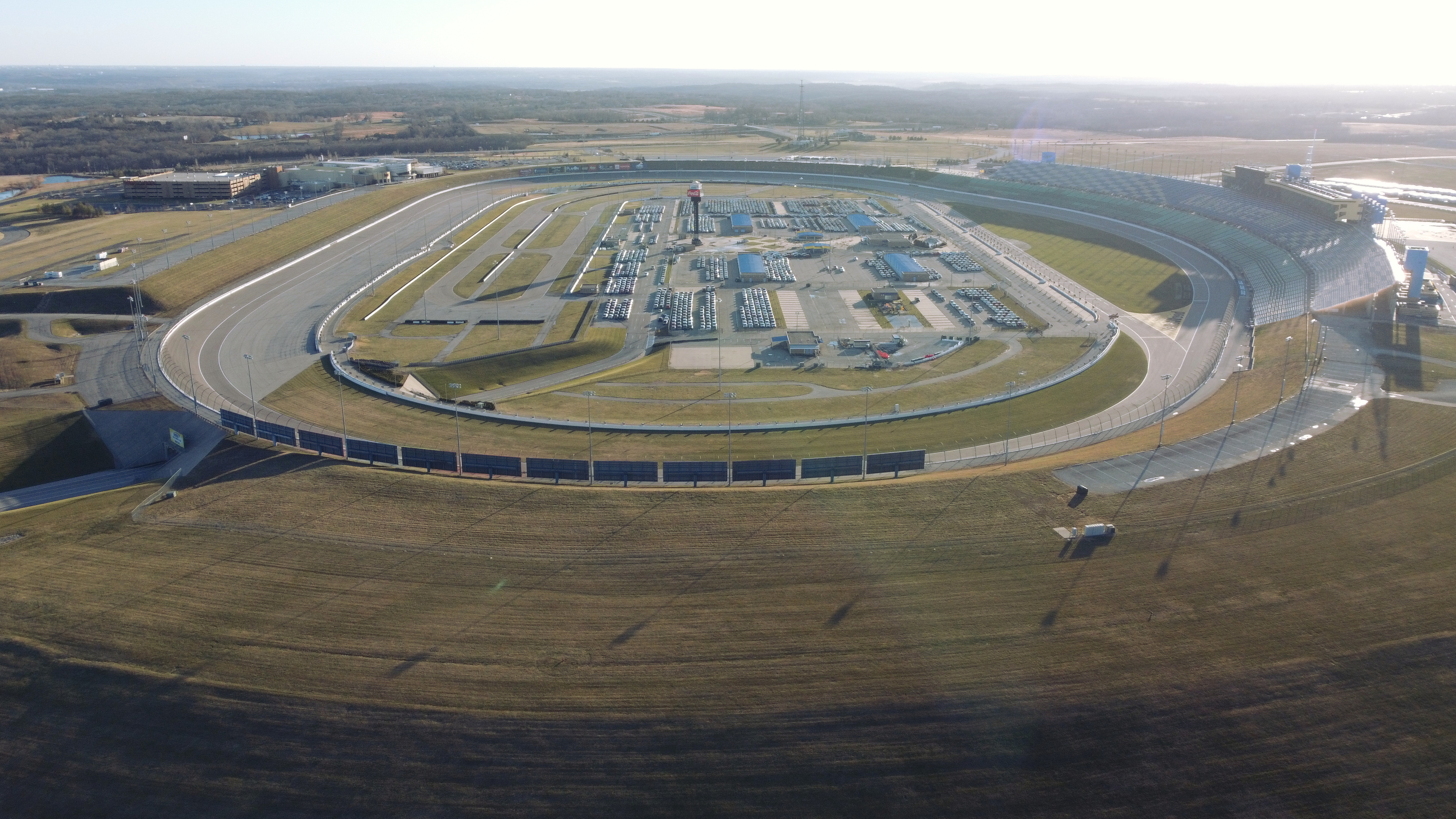
Kansas Speedway, the track where the race was held.

Kansas Speedway is a 1.5-mile (2.4 km) tri-oval race track in Kansas City, Kansas. It was built in 2001 and hosts two annual NASCAR race weekends. The NTT IndyCar Series also raced there until 2011. The speedway is owned and operated by the International Speedway Corporation.

=== Entry list ===
- (R) denotes rookie driver.
- (i) denotes driver who is ineligible for series driver points.
- (P) denotes playoff driver.
- (OP) denotes owner's playoff car.

#	Driver	Team	Make
00	Sheldon Creed (P)	Haas Factory Team	Ford
1	Carson Kvapil (P) (R)	JR Motorsports	Chevrolet
2	Jesse Love (P)	Richard Childress Racing	Chevrolet
4	Parker Retzlaff	Alpha Prime Racing	Chevrolet
07	Nick Leitz	SS-Green Light Racing	Chevrolet
7	Justin Allgaier (P)	JR Motorsports	Chevrolet
8	Sammy Smith (P)	JR Motorsports	Chevrolet
10	Daniel Dye (R)	Kaulig Racing	Chevrolet
11	Brenden Queen	Kaulig Racing	Chevrolet
14	Garrett Smithley	SS-Green Light Racing	Chevrolet
16	Christian Eckes (R)	Kaulig Racing	Chevrolet
17	Rajah Caruth (i)	Hendrick Motorsports	Chevrolet
18	William Sawalich (R)	Joe Gibbs Racing	Toyota
19	Justin Bonsignore (OP)	Joe Gibbs Racing	Toyota
20	Brandon Jones (P)	Joe Gibbs Racing	Toyota
21	Austin Hill (P)	Richard Childress Racing	Chevrolet
24	Patrick Staropoli	Sam Hunt Racing	Toyota
25	Harrison Burton (P)	AM Racing	Ford
26	Dean Thompson (R)	Sam Hunt Racing	Toyota
27	Jeb Burton	Jordan Anderson Racing	Chevrolet
28	Kyle Sieg	RSS Racing	Ford
31	Blaine Perkins	Jordan Anderson Racing	Chevrolet
32	Austin Green	Jordan Anderson Racing	Chevrolet
35	Glen Reen	Joey Gase Motorsports	Ford
39	Ryan Sieg	RSS Racing	Ford
41	Sam Mayer (P)	Haas Factory Team	Ford
42	Anthony Alfredo	Young's Motorsports	Chevrolet
44	Brennan Poole	Alpha Prime Racing	Chevrolet
45	Mason Massey	Alpha Prime Racing	Chevrolet
48	Nick Sanchez (P) (R)	Big Machine Racing	Chevrolet
51	Jeremy Clements	Jeremy Clements Racing	Chevrolet
53	Joey Gase	Joey Gase Motorsports	Chevrolet
54	Taylor Gray (P) (R)	Joe Gibbs Racing	Toyota
70	Leland Honeyman	Cope Family Racing	Chevrolet
71	Ryan Ellis	DGM Racing	Chevrolet
76	Kole Raz	AM Racing	Ford
88	Connor Zilisch (P) (R)	JR Motorsports	Chevrolet
91	Josh Williams	DGM Racing	Chevrolet
99	Matt DiBenedetto	Viking Motorsports	Chevrolet
Official entry list

== Practice ==
For practice, drivers were separated into two groups, A and B. Both sessions were 25 minutes long, and was held on Saturday, September 27, at 9:35 AM CST. Ryan Sieg, driving for RSS Racing, would set the fastest time between both groups, with a lap of 31.319, and a speed of 172.419 mph (277.481 km/h).

Pos.	#	Driver	Team	Make	Time	Speed
1	39	Ryan Sieg	RSS Racing	Ford	31.319	172.419
2	11	Brenden Queen	Kaulig Racing	Chevrolet	31.502	171.418
3	42	Anthony Alfredo	Young's Motorsports	Chevrolet	31.616	170.800
Full practice results

== Qualifying ==
Qualifying was held on Saturday, September 27, at 10:40 PM CST. Since Kansas Speedway is an intermediate racetrack, the qualifying procedure used is a single-car, one-lap system with one round. Drivers will be on track by themselves and will have one lap to post a qualifying time, and whoever sets the fastest time will win the pole.

Brandon Jones, driving for Joe Gibbs Racing, would score the pole for the race, with a lap of 31.140, and a speed of 173.410 mph (279.076 km/h).

Glen Reen was the only driver who failed to qualify.

=== Qualifying results ===
Pos.	#	Driver	Team	Make	Time	Speed
1	20	Brandon Jones (P)	Joe Gibbs Racing	Toyota	31.140	173.410
2	54	Taylor Gray (P) (R)	Joe Gibbs Racing	Toyota	31.236	172.877
3	41	Sam Mayer (P)	Haas Factory Team	Ford	31.269	172.695
4	11	Brenden Queen	Kaulig Racing	Chevrolet	31.424	171.843
5	7	Justin Allgaier (P)	JR Motorsports	Chevrolet	31.430	171.810
6	18	William Sawalich (R)	Joe Gibbs Racing	Toyota	31.460	171.647
7	88	Connor Zilisch (P) (R)	JR Motorsports	Chevrolet	31.520	171.320
8	17	Rajah Caruth (i)	Hendrick Motorsports	Chevrolet	31.527	171.282
9	26	Dean Thompson (R)	Sam Hunt Racing	Toyota	31.531	171.260
10	00	Sheldon Creed (P)	Haas Factory Team	Ford	31.541	171.206
11	24	Patrick Staropoli	Sam Hunt Racing	Toyota	31.565	171.076
12	2	Jesse Love (P)	Richard Childress Racing	Chevrolet	31.566	171.070
13	48	Nick Sanchez (P) (R)	Big Machine Racing	Chevrolet	31.587	170.956
14	8	Sammy Smith (P)	JR Motorsports	Chevrolet	31.616	170.800
15	39	Ryan Sieg	RSS Racing	Ford	31.652	170.605
16	19	Justin Bonsignore (OP)	Joe Gibbs Racing	Toyota	31.702	170.336
17	21	Austin Hill (P)	Richard Childress Racing	Chevrolet	31.707	170.309
18	25	Harrison Burton (P)	AM Racing	Ford	31.726	170.207
19	1	Carson Kvapil (P) (R)	JR Motorsports	Chevrolet	31.799	169.817
20	16	Christian Eckes (R)	Kaulig Racing	Chevrolet	31.879	169.391
21	99	Matt DiBenedetto	Viking Motorsports	Chevrolet	31.901	169.274
22	42	Anthony Alfredo	Young's Motorsports	Chevrolet	31.932	169.109
23	4	Parker Retzlaff	Alpha Prime Racing	Chevrolet	31.938	169.078
24	28	Kyle Sieg	RSS Racing	Ford	31.963	168.945
25	51	Jeremy Clements	Jeremy Clements Racing	Chevrolet	31.969	168.914
26	27	Jeb Burton	Jordan Anderson Racing	Chevrolet	32.046	168.508
27	70	Leland Honeyman	Cope Family Racing	Chevrolet	32.164	167.890
28	31	Blaine Perkins	Jordan Anderson Racing	Chevrolet	32.210	167.650
29	44	Brennan Poole	Alpha Prime Racing	Chevrolet	32.341	166.971
30	45	Mason Massey	Alpha Prime Racing	Chevrolet	32.520	166.052
31	32	Austin Green	Jordan Anderson Racing	Chevrolet	32.612	165.583
32	76	Kole Raz	AM Racing	Ford	32.647	165.406
Qualified by owner's points
33	53	Joey Gase	Joey Gase Motorsports	Chevrolet	32.660	165.340
34	71	Ryan Ellis	DGM Racing	Chevrolet	32.699	165.143
35	07	Nick Leitz	SS-Green Light Racing	Chevrolet	32.704	165.117
36	91	Josh Williams	DGM Racing	Chevrolet	32.958	163.845
37	14	Garrett Smithley	SS-Green Light Racing	Chevrolet	33.125	163.019
38	10	Daniel Dye (R)	Kaulig Racing	Chevrolet	–	–
Failed to qualify
39	35	Glen Reen	Joey Gase Motorsports	Ford	33.550	160.954
Official qualifying results
Official starting lineup

== Race results ==
Stage 1 Laps: 45

Pos.	#	Driver	Team	Make	Pts
1	7	Justin Allgaier (P)	JR Motorsports	Chevrolet	10
2	20	Brandon Jones (P)	Joe Gibbs Racing	Toyota	9
3	41	Sam Mayer (P)	Haas Factory Team	Ford	8
4	88	Connor Zilisch (P) (R)	JR Motorsports	Chevrolet	7
5	54	Taylor Gray (P) (R)	Joe Gibbs Racing	Toyota	6
6	11	Brenden Queen (i)	Kaulig Racing	Chevrolet	0
7	2	Jesse Love (P)	Richard Childress Racing	Chevrolet	4
8	21	Austin Hill (P)	Richard Childress Racing	Chevrolet	3
9	8	Sammy Smith (P)	JR Motorsports	Chevrolet	2
10	26	Dean Thompson (R)	Sam Hunt Racing	Toyota	1

Stage 2 Laps: 45

Pos.	#	Driver	Team	Make	Pts
1	7	Justin Allgaier (P)	JR Motorsports	Chevrolet	10
2	20	Brandon Jones (P)	Joe Gibbs Racing	Toyota	9
3	41	Sam Mayer (P)	Haas Factory Team	Ford	8
4	88	Connor Zilisch (P) (R)	JR Motorsports	Chevrolet	7
5	8	Sammy Smith (P)	JR Motorsports	Chevrolet	6
6	54	Taylor Gray (P) (R)	Joe Gibbs Racing	Toyota	5
7	26	Dean Thompson (R)	Sam Hunt Racing	Toyota	4
8	21	Austin Hill (P)	Richard Childress Racing	Chevrolet	3
9	00	Sheldon Creed (P)	Haas Factory Team	Ford	2
10	19	Justin Bonsignore (OP)	Joe Gibbs Racing	Toyota	1

Stage 3 Laps: 110

Fin	St	#	Driver	Team	Make	Laps	Led	Status	Pts
1	1	20	Brandon Jones (P)	Joe Gibbs Racing	Toyota	200	54	Running	59
2	7	88	Connor Zilisch (P) (R)	JR Motorsports	Chevrolet	200	42	Running	49
3	17	21	Austin Hill (P)	Richard Childress Racing	Chevrolet	200	0	Running	40
4	14	8	Sammy Smith (P)	JR Motorsports	Chevrolet	200	0	Running	41
5	10	00	Sheldon Creed (P)	Haas Factory Team	Ford	200	0	Running	34
6	2	54	Taylor Gray (P) (R)	Joe Gibbs Racing	Toyota	200	13	Running	42
7	12	2	Jesse Love (P)	Richard Childress Racing	Chevrolet	200	0	Running	34
8	13	48	Nick Sanchez (P) (R)	Big Machine Racing	Chevrolet	200	1	Running	29
9	4	11	Brenden Queen	Kaulig Racing	Chevrolet	200	8	Running	33
10	9	26	Dean Thompson (R)	Sam Hunt Racing	Toyota	200	0	Running	32
11	6	18	William Sawalich (R)	Joe Gibbs Racing	Toyota	200	0	Running	26
12	38	10	Daniel Dye (R)	Kaulig Racing	Chevrolet	200	0	Running	25
13	5	7	Justin Allgaier (P)	JR Motorsports	Chevrolet	200	79	Running	44
14	20	16	Christian Eckes (R)	Kaulig Racing	Chevrolet	200	3	Running	23
15	19	1	Carson Kvapil (P) (R)	JR Motorsports	Chevrolet	200	0	Running	22
16	3	41	Sam Mayer (P)	Haas Factory Team	Ford	200	0	Running	37
17	24	28	Kyle Sieg	RSS Racing	Ford	200	0	Running	20
18	8	17	Rajah Caruth (i)	Hendrick Motorsports	Chevrolet	199	0	Running	0
19	15	39	Ryan Sieg	RSS Racing	Ford	199	0	Running	18
20	18	25	Harrison Burton (P)	AM Racing	Ford	199	0	Running	17
21	27	70	Leland Honeyman	Cope Family Racing	Chevrolet	199	0	Running	16
22	11	24	Patrick Staropoli	Sam Hunt Racing	Toyota	199	0	Running	15
23	21	99	Matt DiBenedetto	Viking Motorsports	Chevrolet	199	0	Running	14
24	36	91	Josh Williams	DGM Racing	Chevrolet	199	0	Running	13
25	22	42	Anthony Alfredo	Young's Motorsports	Chevrolet	199	0	Running	12
26	34	71	Ryan Ellis	DGM Racing	Chevrolet	198	0	Running	11
27	23	4	Parker Retzlaff	Alpha Prime Racing	Chevrolet	198	0	Running	10
28	29	44	Brennan Poole	Alpha Prime Racing	Chevrolet	198	0	Running	9
29	31	32	Austin Green	Jordan Anderson Racing	Chevrolet	198	0	Running	8
30	26	27	Jeb Burton	Jordan Anderson Racing	Chevrolet	198	0	Running	7
31	30	45	Mason Massey	Alpha Prime Racing	Chevrolet	197	0	Running	6
32	25	51	Jeremy Clements	Jeremy Clements Racing	Chevrolet	197	0	Running	5
33	33	53	Joey Gase	Joey Gase Motorsports	Chevrolet	196	0	Running	4
34	37	14	Garrett Smithley	SS-Green Light Racing	Chevrolet	195	0	Running	3
35	32	76	Kole Raz	AM Racing	Ford	195	0	Running	2
36	28	31	Blaine Perkins	Jordan Anderson Racing	Chevrolet	195	0	Running	1
37	16	19	Justin Bonsignore (OP)	Joe Gibbs Racing	Toyota	154	0	Accident	2
38	35	07	Nick Leitz	SS-Green Light Racing	Chevrolet	140	0	Running	1
Official race results

== Standings after the race ==
Drivers' Championship standings

	Pos	Driver	Points
	1	Connor Zilisch	2,165
	2	Justin Allgaier	2,128 (–37)
	3	Sam Mayer	2,103 (–62)
2	4	Brandon Jones	2,098 (–67)
3	5	Taylor Gray	2,076 (–89)
1	6	Sheldon Creed	2,072 (–93)
3	7	Carson Kvapil	2,069 (–96)
2	8	Jesse Love	2,065 (–100)
	9	Nick Sanchez	2,060 (–105)
1	10	Austin Hill	2,058 (–107)
6	11	Harrison Burton	2,057 (–108)
	12	Sammy Smith	2,051 (–114)
Official driver's standings

Manufacturers' Championship standings

Pos	Manufacturer	Points
1	Chevrolet	1,088
2	Toyota	921 (–167)
3	Ford	880 (–208)

- Note: Only the first 12 positions are included for the driver standings.

Previous race: 2025 Food City 300	NASCAR Xfinity Series; 2025 season	Next race: 2025 Blue Cross NC 250
