= 2025 Food City 300 =

27th race of the 2025 NASCAR Xfinity Series

Race details
- Race 27 of 33 of the 2025 NASCAR Xfinity Series
- Date: September 12, 2025
- Official name: 44th Annual Food City 300
- Location: Bristol Motor Speedway in Bristol, Tennessee
- Course: Permanent racing facility
- Course length: 0.533 miles (0.858 km)
- Distance: 300 laps, 160 mi (257 km)
- Scheduled distance: 300 laps, 160 mi (257 km)
- Average speed: 79.861 mph (128.524 km/h)

Pole position
| Driver | Justin Allgaier | JR Motorsports |
- Time: 15.843

Most laps led
| Driver | Connor Zilisch | JR Motorsports |
- Laps: 98

Winner
| No. 19 | Aric Almirola | Joe Gibbs Racing |

Television in the United States
- Network: The CW
- Announcers: Adam Alexander and Parker Kligerman

Radio in the United States
- Radio: PRN

The 2025 Food City 300 was the 27th stock car race of the 2025 NASCAR Xfinity Series, the first race of the Round of 12, and the 44th iteration of the event. The race was held on Friday, September 12, 2025, at Bristol Motor Speedway in Bristol, Tennessee, a 0.533 miles (0.858 km) permanent oval shaped racetrack. The race took the scheduled 300 laps to complete.

In an action-packed race, Aric Almirola, driving for Joe Gibbs Racing, would take advantage of the lead after a late caution, and led the final 34 laps to earn his ninth career NASCAR Xfinity Series win, and his second of the season. He would also advance JGR into the next round of the owner's playoffs. To fill out the podium, Sheldon Creed and Sam Mayer, both driving for Haas Factory Team, would finish 2nd and 3rd, respectively.

== Report ==
=== Background ===
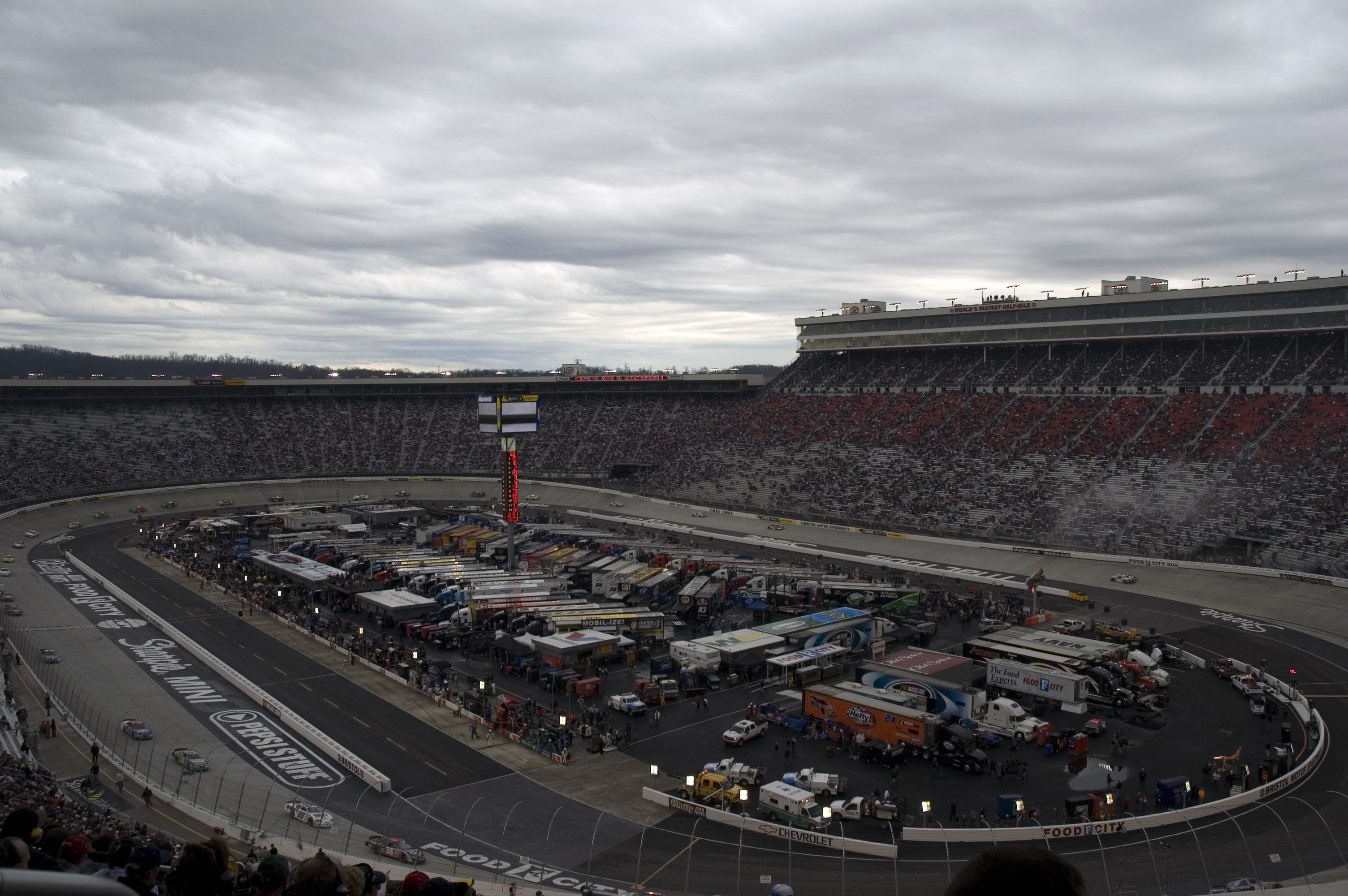
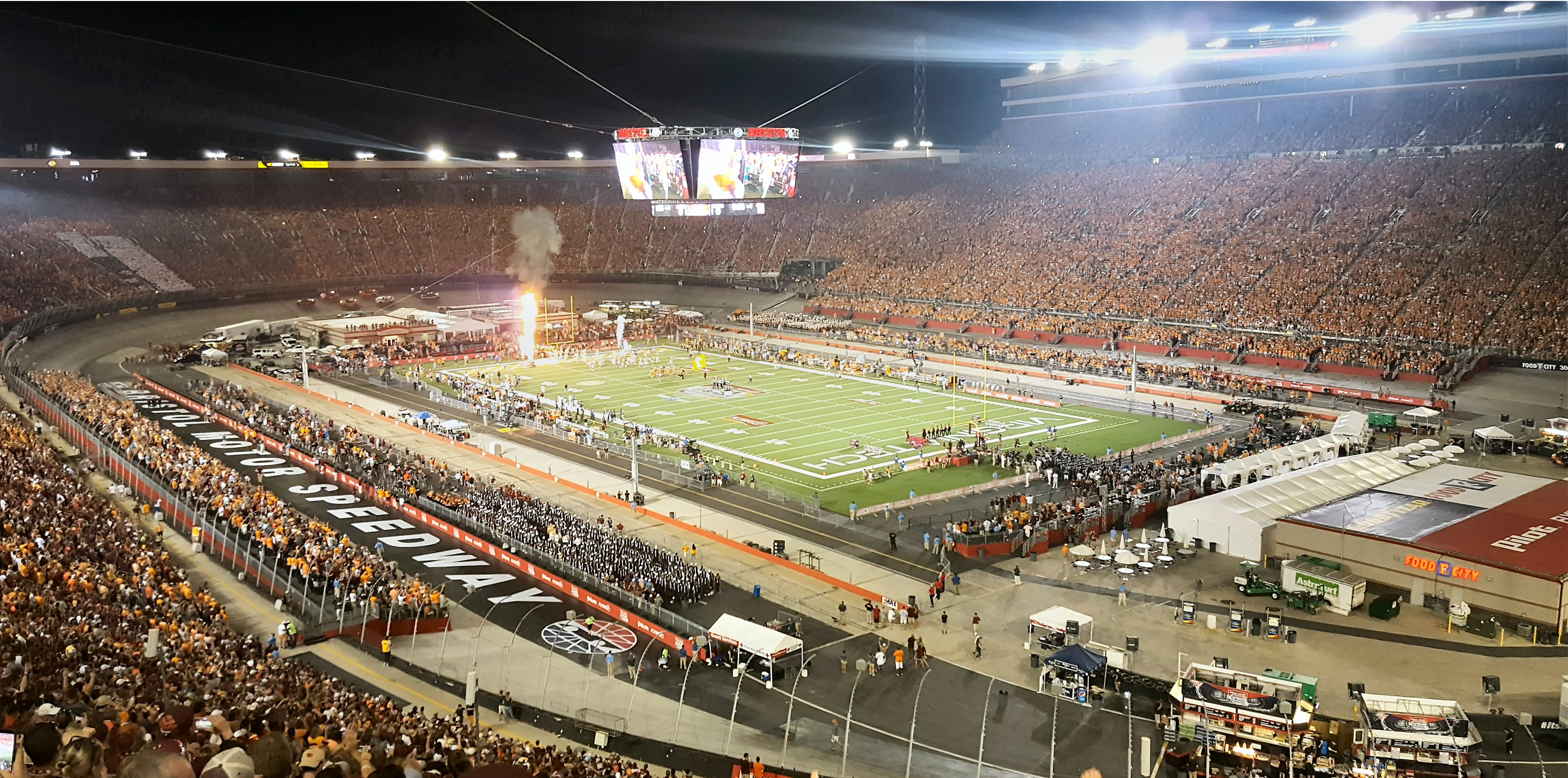
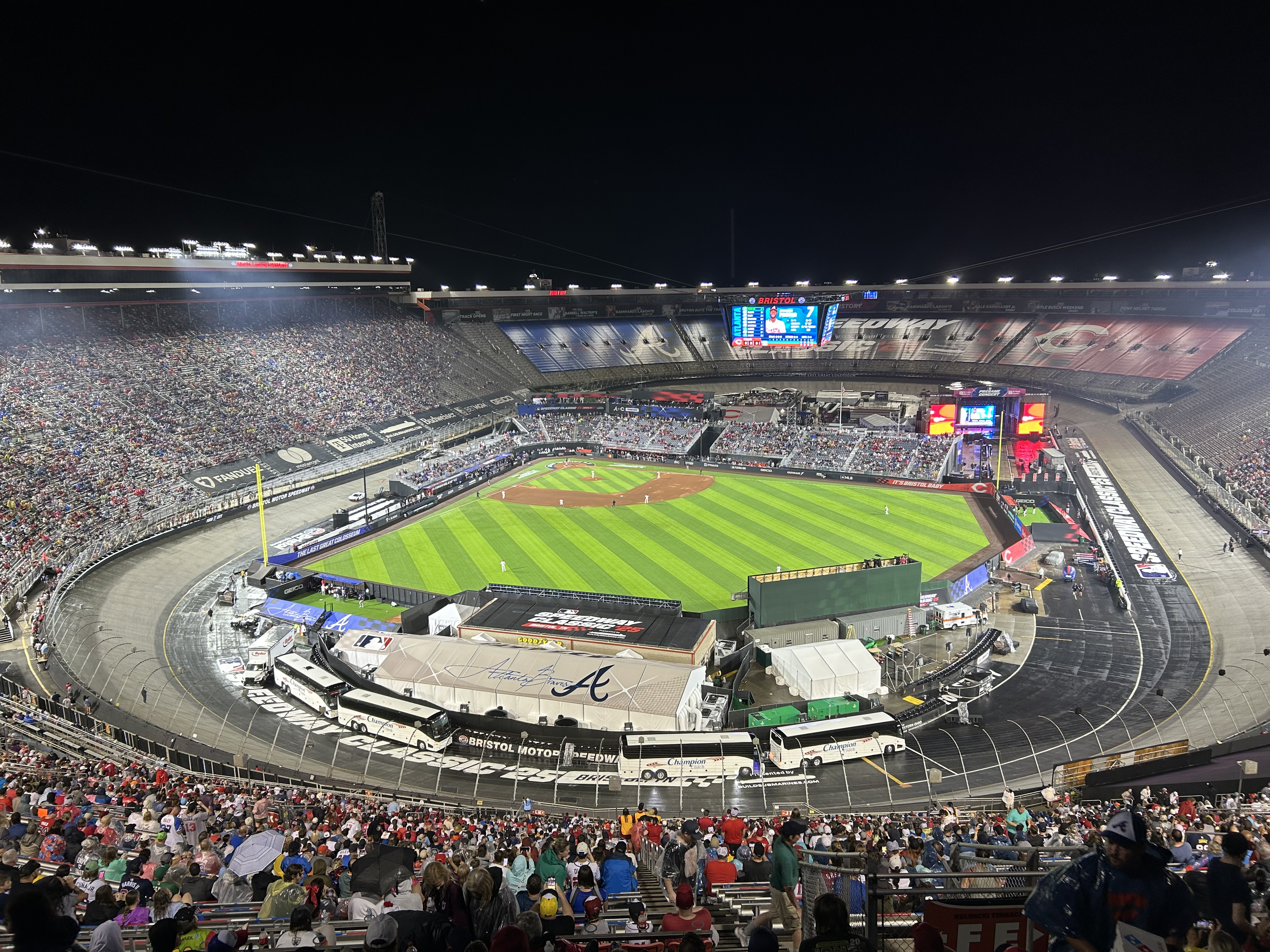
The Track (left) the Battle at Bristol (center) and the MLB Speedway Classic (right), are all events previously held at Bristol Motor Speedway.

The Bristol Motor Speedway, formerly known as Bristol International Raceway and Bristol Raceway, is a NASCAR short track venue located in Bristol, Tennessee. Constructed in 1960, it held its first NASCAR race on July 30, 1961. Despite its short length, Bristol is among the most popular tracks on the NASCAR schedule because of its distinct features, which include extraordinarily steep banking, an all concrete surface, two pit roads, and stadium-like seating. It has also been named one of the loudest NASCAR tracks.

Besides holding racing events, the track has hosted the Battle at Bristol, a college football game between the Tennessee Volunteers and Virginia Tech Hokies on September 10, 2016 and the MLB Speedway Classic, an MLB baseball game between the Atlanta Braves and the Cincinnati Reds from August 2-3, 2025.

=== Entry list ===
- (R) denotes rookie driver.
- (i) denotes driver who is ineligible for series driver points.
- (P) denotes playoff driver.
- (OP) denotes owner's playoff car.

| # | Driver | Team | Make |
|---|---|---|---|
| 00 | Sheldon Creed (P) | Haas Factory Team | Ford |
| 1 | Carson Kvapil (P) (R) | JR Motorsports | Chevrolet |
| 2 | Jesse Love (P) | Richard Childress Racing | Chevrolet |
| 4 | Parker Retzlaff | Alpha Prime Racing | Chevrolet |
| 07 | Carson Ware | SS-Green Light Racing | Chevrolet |
| 7 | Justin Allgaier (P) | JR Motorsports | Chevrolet |
| 8 | Sammy Smith (P) | JR Motorsports | Chevrolet |
| 10 | Daniel Dye (R) | Kaulig Racing | Chevrolet |
| 11 | Brenden Queen (i) | Kaulig Racing | Chevrolet |
| 14 | Garrett Smithley | SS-Green Light Racing | Chevrolet |
| 16 | Christian Eckes (R) | Kaulig Racing | Chevrolet |
| 17 | Corey Day | Hendrick Motorsports | Chevrolet |
| 18 | William Sawalich (R) | Joe Gibbs Racing | Toyota |
| 19 | Aric Almirola (OP) | Joe Gibbs Racing | Toyota |
| 20 | Brandon Jones (P) | Joe Gibbs Racing | Toyota |
| 21 | Austin Hill (P) | Richard Childress Racing | Chevrolet |
| 24 | Jeffrey Earnhardt | Sam Hunt Racing | Toyota |
| 25 | Harrison Burton (P) | AM Racing | Ford |
| 26 | Dean Thompson (R) | Sam Hunt Racing | Toyota |
| 27 | Jeb Burton | Jordan Anderson Racing | Chevrolet |
| 28 | Kyle Sieg | RSS Racing | Ford |
| 31 | Blaine Perkins | Jordan Anderson Racing | Chevrolet |
| 32 | Austin Green | Jordan Anderson Racing | Chevrolet |
| 35 | Stefan Parsons (i) | Joey Gase Motorsports | Chevrolet |
| 39 | Ryan Sieg | RSS Racing | Ford |
| 41 | Sam Mayer (P) | Haas Factory Team | Ford |
| 42 | Anthony Alfredo | Young's Motorsports | Chevrolet |
| 44 | Brennan Poole | Alpha Prime Racing | Chevrolet |
| 45 | Josh Williams | Alpha Prime Racing | Chevrolet |
| 48 | Nick Sanchez (P) (R) | Big Machine Racing | Chevrolet |
| 51 | Jeremy Clements | Jeremy Clements Racing | Chevrolet |
| 53 | Joey Gase | Joey Gase Motorsports | Chevrolet |
| 54 | Taylor Gray (P) (R) | Joe Gibbs Racing | Toyota |
| 70 | Leland Honeyman | Cope Family Racing | Chevrolet |
| 71 | Ryan Ellis | DGM Racing | Chevrolet |
| 88 | Connor Zilisch (P) (R) | JR Motorsports | Chevrolet |
| 91 | Josh Bilicki | DGM Racing | Chevrolet |
| 99 | Matt DiBenedetto | Viking Motorsports | Chevrolet |
Official entry list

== Practice ==
For practice, drivers were separated into two groups, A and B. Both sessions were 25 minutes long, and was held on Friday, September 12, at 2:00 PM EST. Ryan Sieg, driving for RSS Racing, would set the fastest time between both groups, with a lap of 15.929, and a speed of 120.460 mph (193.862 km/h).

| Pos. | # | Driver | Team | Make | Time | Speed |
|---|---|---|---|---|---|---|
| 1 | 39 | Ryan Sieg | RSS Racing | Ford | 15.929 | 120.460 |
| 2 | 26 | Dean Thompson (R) | Sam Hunt Racing | Toyota | 16.043 | 119.604 |
| 3 | 17 | Corey Day | Hendrick Motorsports | Chevrolet | 16.054 | 119.522 |
Full practice results

== Qualifying ==
Qualifying was held on Friday, September 12, at 3:05 PM EST. Since Bristol Motor Speedway is a short track, the qualifying procedure used is a single-car, two-lap system with one round. Drivers will be on track by themselves and will have two laps to post a qualifying time, and whoever sets the fastest time will win the pole.

Justin Allgaier, driving for JR Motorsports, would score the pole for the race, with a lap of 15.843, and a speed of 121.113 mph (194.912 km/h).

No drivers would to fail to qualify.

=== Qualifying results ===
| Pos. | # | Driver | Team | Make | Time | Speed |
|---|---|---|---|---|---|---|
| 1 | 7 | Justin Allgaier (P) | JR Motorsports | Chevrolet | 15.843 | 121.113 |
| 2 | 41 | Sam Mayer (P) | Haas Factory Team | Ford | 15.937 | 120.399 |
| 3 | 19 | Aric Almirola (OP) | Joe Gibbs Racing | Toyota | 15.947 | 120.324 |
| 4 | 88 | Connor Zilisch (P) (R) | JR Motorsports | Chevrolet | 15.952 | 120.286 |
| 5 | 54 | Taylor Gray (P) (R) | Joe Gibbs Racing | Toyota | 15.976 | 120.105 |
| 6 | 18 | William Sawalich (R) | Joe Gibbs Racing | Toyota | 16.022 | 119.760 |
| 7 | 25 | Harrison Burton (P) | AM Racing | Ford | 16.023 | 119.753 |
| 8 | 39 | Ryan Sieg | RSS Racing | Ford | 16.047 | 119.574 |
| 9 | 2 | Jesse Love (P) | Richard Childress Racing | Chevrolet | 16.049 | 119.559 |
| 10 | 00 | Sheldon Creed (P) | Haas Factory Team | Ford | 16.057 | 119.499 |
| 11 | 1 | Carson Kvapil (P) (R) | JR Motorsports | Chevrolet | 16.073 | 119.380 |
| 12 | 16 | Christian Eckes (R) | Kaulig Racing | Chevrolet | 16.083 | 119.306 |
| 13 | 35 | Stefan Parsons (i) | Joey Gase Motorsports | Chevrolet | 16.107 | 119.128 |
| 14 | 8 | Sammy Smith (P) | JR Motorsports | Chevrolet | 16.129 | 118.966 |
| 15 | 4 | Parker Retzlaff | Alpha Prime Racing | Chevrolet | 16.152 | 118.796 |
| 16 | 26 | Dean Thompson (R) | Sam Hunt Racing | Toyota | 16.163 | 118.716 |
| 17 | 17 | Corey Day | Hendrick Motorsports | Chevrolet | 16.167 | 118.686 |
| 18 | 44 | Brennan Poole | Alpha Prime Racing | Chevrolet | 16.168 | 118.679 |
| 19 | 27 | Jeb Burton | Jordan Anderson Racing | Chevrolet | 16.209 | 118.379 |
| 20 | 48 | Nick Sanchez (P) (R) | Big Machine Racing | Chevrolet | 16.211 | 118.364 |
| 21 | 21 | Austin Hill (P) | Richard Childress Racing | Chevrolet | 16.212 | 118.357 |
| 22 | 20 | Brandon Jones (P) | Joe Gibbs Racing | Toyota | 16.215 | 118.335 |
| 23 | 70 | Leland Honeyman | Cope Family Racing | Chevrolet | 16.226 | 118.255 |
| 24 | 24 | Jeffrey Earnhardt | Sam Hunt Racing | Toyota | 16.229 | 118.233 |
| 25 | 99 | Matt DiBenedetto | Viking Motorsports | Chevrolet | 16.261 | 118.000 |
| 26 | 51 | Jeremy Clements | Jeremy Clements Racing | Chevrolet | 16.273 | 117.913 |
| 27 | 42 | Anthony Alfredo | Young's Motorsports | Chevrolet | 16.305 | 117.682 |
| 28 | 11 | Brenden Queen (i) | Kaulig Racing | Chevrolet | 16.309 | 117.653 |
| 29 | 71 | Ryan Ellis | DGM Racing | Chevrolet | 16.351 | 117.351 |
| 30 | 28 | Kyle Sieg | RSS Racing | Ford | 16.412 | 116.914 |
| 31 | 10 | Daniel Dye (R) | Kaulig Racing | Chevrolet | 16.434 | 116.758 |
| 32 | 91 | Josh Bilicki | DGM Racing | Chevrolet | 16.544 | 115.982 |
Qualified by owner's points
| 33 | 45 | Josh Williams | Alpha Prime Racing | Chevrolet | 16.579 | 115.737 |
| 34 | 14 | Logan Bearden | SS-Green Light Racing | Chevrolet | 16.659 | 115.181 |
| 35 | 07 | Carson Ware | SS-Green Light Racing | Chevrolet | 16.736 | 114.651 |
| 36 | 53 | Joey Gase | Joey Gase Motorsports | Chevrolet | 16.738 | 114.637 |
| 37 | 32 | Austin Green | Jordan Anderson Racing | Chevrolet | 16.750 | 114.555 |
| 38 | 31 | Blaine Perkins | Jordan Anderson Racing | Chevrolet | – | – |
Official qualifying results
Official starting lineup

== Race results ==
Stage 1 Laps: 85

| Pos. | # | Driver | Team | Make | Pts |
|---|---|---|---|---|---|
| 1 | 7 | Justin Allgaier (P) | JR Motorsports | Chevrolet | 10 |
| 2 | 88 | Connor Zilisch (P) (R) | JR Motorsports | Chevrolet | 9 |
| 3 | 25 | Harrison Burton (P) | AM Racing | Ford | 8 |
| 4 | 41 | Sam Mayer (P) | Haas Factory Team | Ford | 7 |
| 5 | 2 | Jesse Love (P) | Richard Childress Racing | Chevrolet | 6 |
| 6 | 19 | Aric Almirola (OP) | Joe Gibbs Racing | Toyota | 5 |
| 7 | 39 | Ryan Sieg | RSS Racing | Ford | 4 |
| 8 | 1 | Carson Kvapil (P) (R) | JR Motorsports | Chevrolet | 3 |
| 9 | 54 | Taylor Gray (P) (R) | Joe Gibbs Racing | Toyota | 2 |
| 10 | 18 | William Sawalich (R) | Joe Gibbs Racing | Toyota | 1 |

Stage 2 Laps: 85

| Pos. | # | Driver | Team | Make | Pts |
|---|---|---|---|---|---|
| 1 | 88 | Connor Zilisch (P) (R) | JR Motorsports | Chevrolet | 10 |
| 2 | 41 | Sam Mayer (P) | Haas Factory Team | Ford | 9 |
| 3 | 7 | Justin Allgaier (P) | JR Motorsports | Chevrolet | 8 |
| 4 | 19 | Aric Almirola (OP) | Joe Gibbs Racing | Toyota | 7 |
| 5 | 1 | Carson Kvapil (P) (R) | JR Motorsports | Chevrolet | 6 |
| 6 | 26 | Dean Thompson (R) | Sam Hunt Racing | Toyota | 5 |
| 7 | 54 | Taylor Gray (P) (R) | Joe Gibbs Racing | Toyota | 4 |
| 8 | 18 | William Sawalich (R) | Joe Gibbs Racing | Toyota | 3 |
| 9 | 44 | Brennan Poole | Alpha Prime Racing | Chevrolet | 2 |
| 10 | 48 | Nick Sanchez (P) (R) | Big Machine Racing | Chevrolet | 1 |

Stage 3 Laps: 130

| Fin | St | # | Driver | Team | Make | Laps | Led | Status | Pts |
|---|---|---|---|---|---|---|---|---|---|
| 1 | 3 | 19 | Aric Almirola (OP) | Joe Gibbs Racing | Toyota | 300 | 34 | Running | 52 |
| 2 | 10 | 00 | Sheldon Creed (P) | Haas Factory Team | Ford | 300 | 0 | Running | 35 |
| 3 | 2 | 41 | Sam Mayer (P) | Haas Factory Team | Ford | 300 | 68 | Running | 50 |
| 4 | 11 | 1 | Carson Kvapil (P) (R) | JR Motorsports | Chevrolet | 300 | 0 | Running | 42 |
| 5 | 4 | 88 | Connor Zilisch (P) (R) | JR Motorsports | Chevrolet | 300 | 98 | Running | 52 |
| 6 | 1 | 7 | Justin Allgaier (P) | JR Motorsports | Chevrolet | 300 | 95 | Running | 49 |
| 7 | 7 | 25 | Harrison Burton (P) | AM Racing | Ford | 300 | 4 | Running | 38 |
| 8 | 12 | 16 | Christian Eckes (R) | Kaulig Racing | Chevrolet | 300 | 0 | Running | 29 |
| 9 | 26 | 51 | Jeremy Clements | Jeremy Clements Racing | Chevrolet | 300 | 0 | Running | 28 |
| 10 | 18 | 44 | Brennan Poole | Alpha Prime Racing | Chevrolet | 300 | 0 | Running | 29 |
| 11 | 22 | 20 | Brandon Jones (P) | Joe Gibbs Racing | Toyota | 300 | 0 | Running | 26 |
| 12 | 16 | 26 | Dean Thompson (R) | Sam Hunt Racing | Toyota | 300 | 0 | Running | 30 |
| 13 | 20 | 48 | Nick Sanchez (P) (R) | Big Machine Racing | Chevrolet | 300 | 0 | Running | 25 |
| 14 | 5 | 54 | Taylor Gray (P) (R) | Joe Gibbs Racing | Toyota | 300 | 0 | Running | 29 |
| 15 | 6 | 18 | William Sawalich (R) | Joe Gibbs Racing | Toyota | 300 | 0 | Running | 26 |
| 16 | 15 | 4 | Parker Retzlaff | Alpha Prime Racing | Chevrolet | 300 | 0 | Running | 21 |
| 17 | 17 | 17 | Corey Day | Hendrick Motorsports | Chevrolet | 300 | 0 | Running | 20 |
| 18 | 19 | 27 | Jeb Burton | Jordan Anderson Racing | Chevrolet | 300 | 0 | Running | 19 |
| 19 | 21 | 21 | Austin Hill (P) | Richard Childress Racing | Chevrolet | 300 | 0 | Running | 18 |
| 20 | 28 | 11 | Brenden Queen (i) | Kaulig Racing | Chevrolet | 300 | 0 | Running | 0 |
| 21 | 30 | 28 | Kyle Sieg | RSS Racing | Ford | 300 | 0 | Running | 16 |
| 22 | 27 | 42 | Anthony Alfredo | Young's Motorsports | Chevrolet | 300 | 0 | Running | 15 |
| 23 | 8 | 39 | Ryan Sieg | RSS Racing | Ford | 299 | 0 | Running | 18 |
| 24 | 25 | 99 | Matt DiBenedetto | Viking Motorsports | Chevrolet | 299 | 0 | Running | 13 |
| 25 | 9 | 2 | Jesse Love (P) | Richard Childress Racing | Chevrolet | 299 | 1 | Running | 18 |
| 26 | 31 | 10 | Daniel Dye (R) | Kaulig Racing | Chevrolet | 299 | 0 | Running | 11 |
| 27 | 24 | 24 | Jeffrey Earnhardt | Sam Hunt Racing | Toyota | 299 | 0 | Running | 10 |
| 28 | 33 | 45 | Josh Williams | Alpha Prime Racing | Chevrolet | 298 | 0 | Running | 9 |
| 29 | 32 | 91 | Josh Bilicki | DGM Racing | Chevrolet | 296 | 0 | Running | 8 |
| 30 | 34 | 14 | Logan Bearden | SS-Green Light Racing | Chevrolet | 296 | 0 | Running | 7 |
| 31 | 37 | 32 | Austin Green | Jordan Anderson Racing | Chevrolet | 295 | 0 | Running | 6 |
| 32 | 23 | 70 | Leland Honeyman | Cope Family Racing | Chevrolet | 294 | 0 | Running | 5 |
| 33 | 35 | 07 | Carson Ware | SS-Green Light Racing | Chevrolet | 288 | 0 | Running | 4 |
| 34 | 38 | 31 | Blaine Perkins | Jordan Anderson Racing | Chevrolet | 287 | 0 | Running | 3 |
| 35 | 36 | 53 | Joey Gase | Joey Gase Motorsports | Chevrolet | 268 | 0 | Axle | 2 |
| 36 | 13 | 35 | Stefan Parsons (i) | Joey Gase Motorsports | Chevrolet | 81 | 0 | Accident | 0 |
| 37 | 14 | 8 | Sammy Smith (P) | JR Motorsports | Chevrolet | 56 | 0 | Engine | 1 |
| 38 | 29 | 71 | Ryan Ellis | DGM Racing | Chevrolet | 55 | 0 | Oil Cooler | 1 |
Official race results

== Standings after the race ==
Drivers' Championship standings

| | Pos | Driver | Points |
|---|---|---|---|
| | 1 | Connor Zilisch | 2,116 |
| | 2 | Justin Allgaier | 2,084 (–32) |
| | 3 | Sam Mayer | 2,066 (–50) |
| 4 | 4 | Carson Kvapil | 2,047 (–69) |
| 6 | 5 | Harrison Burton | 2,040 (–76) |
| 1 | 6 | Brandon Jones | 2,039 (–77) |
| 3 | 7 | Sheldon Creed | 2,038 (–78) |
| 1 | 8 | Taylor Gray | 2,034 (–82) |
| 2 | 9 | Nick Sanchez | 2,031 (–85) |
| 6 | 10 | Jesse Love | 2,031 (–85) |
| 1 | 11 | Austin Hill | 2,018 (–98) |
| 6 | 12 | Sammy Smith | 2,010 (–106) |
Official driver's standings

Manufacturers' Championship standings

| Pos | Manufacturer | Points |
|---|---|---|
| 1 | Chevrolet | 1,053 |
| 2 | Toyota | 881 (–172) |
| 3 | Ford | 848 (–205) |

- Note: Only the first 12 positions are included for the driver standings.

| Previous race: 2025 Nu Way 200 | NASCAR Xfinity Series; 2025 season | Next race: 2025 Kansas Lottery 300 |
