= Mason Maggio =

American racing driver (born 2004)

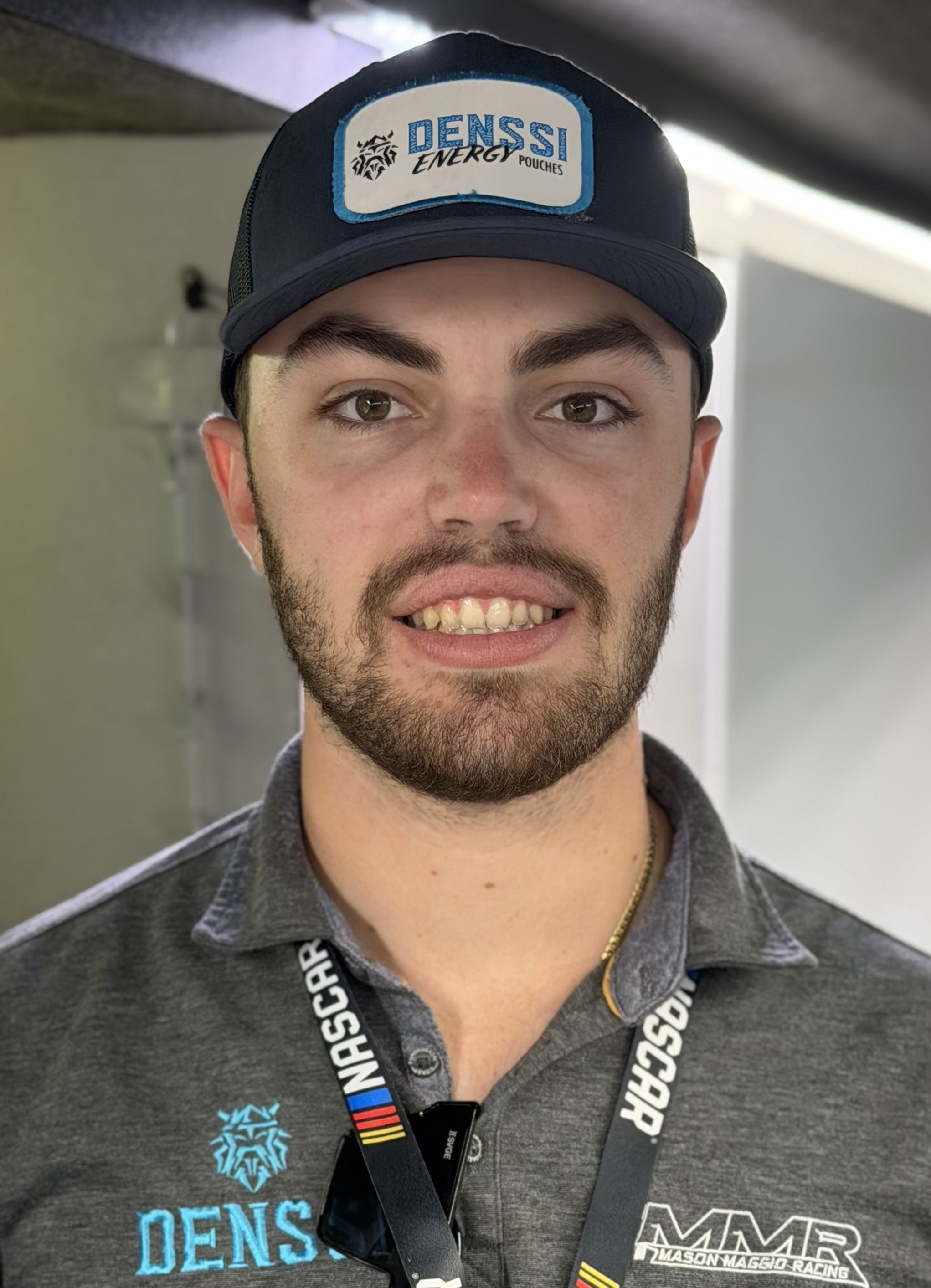
- Maggio at Las Vegas Motor Speedway in 2025
- Born: Mason Steele Maggio; July 7, 2004 (age 22); Palm Beach, Florida, U.S.
- Height: 5 ft 8 in (1.73 m)
- Weight: 150 lb (68 kg)
- Awards: 2022 Carolina Pro Late Model Series Rookie of the Year

NASCAR O'Reilly Auto Parts Series career
- 40 races run over 4 years
- 2026 position: 32nd
- Best finish: 32nd (2026)
- First race: 2023 ToyotaCare 250 (Richmond)
- Last race: 2026 O'Reilly Auto Parts 300 (Homestead)
Wins	Top tens	Poles
0	0	0

NASCAR FedEx Freight Truck Series career
- 27 races run over 4 years
- 2025 position: 69th
- Best finish: 34th (2024)
- First race: 2022 Toyota 200 (Gateway)
- Last race: 2025 NASCAR Craftsman Truck Series Championship Race (Phoenix)
Wins	Top tens	Poles
0	0	0
- Statistics up to date as of November 7, 2026.

Mason Steele Maggio (born July 7, 2004) is an American professional stock car racing driver. He last competed part-time in the NASCAR O'Reilly Auto Parts Series, driving the No. 91/92 Chevrolet Camaro SS for DGM Racing with Jesse Iwuji Motorsports.

== Racing career ==
=== Early career ===
==== Go-Karts: 2015–2017 ====
Maggio began racing at around eleven to twelve years old after he went to a rental go-kart track with his friends.

==== INEX: Bandoleros and Legend Cars ====
Maggio began driving Bandoleros from 2018 to 2019, where he won eleven races, three championships, and ranked third in the National standings. He would move up to Legend Cars in 2020, earning eight wins and three championships.

==== Limited Late Models ====
Maggio made his Limited Late Model debut in 2021, racing full time in the Paramount Kia Big 10 Challenge for Leicht Motorsports. He earned four wins, eight top-fives, ten top-tens, and finished third in the final standings.

==== Pro Late Models ====
On November 17, 2021, Maggio announced on Twitter that he would run full-time in the Carolina Pro Late Model Series for Rick Ware Racing in 2022. He earned three wins at Franklin County Speedway, Goodyear All American Speedway, and Motor Mile Speedway.

=== ARCA Menards Series ===
==== 2022 ====
In 2022, Maggio would do the ARCA Menards Series pre-season testing at Daytona International Speedway for Jankowiak Motorsports, where he set the 25th quickest time between the two sessions held.

=== NASCAR Craftsman Truck Series ===
==== 2022 ====
On May 30, 2022, Reaume Brothers Racing announced that Maggio would make his NASCAR Camping World Truck Series debut piloting their No. 33 truck at World Wide Technology Raceway, he would start 33rd and finish 27th. On August 8, it was announced that Maggio would make his second start of the season at Richmond Raceway, driving the No. 96 truck for Peck Motorsports. After failing to qualify for the race, Josh Reaume would allow Maggio to drive his No. 43 truck instead.

=== O'Reilly Auto Parts Series ===
On January 30, 2023, Maggio tested an Xfinity Series car at Charlotte Motor Speedway for MBM Motorsports. On February 24, MBM announced that Maggio would make his series debut for the team at Las Vegas Motor Speedway in March.

Maggio made his first Xfinity Series start of 2024 in the fall race at Atlanta, finishing eighteenth in the No. 35 car for Joey Gase Motorsports. He was announced to drive for Alpha Prime Racing in their No. 45 car in the race at Homestead.

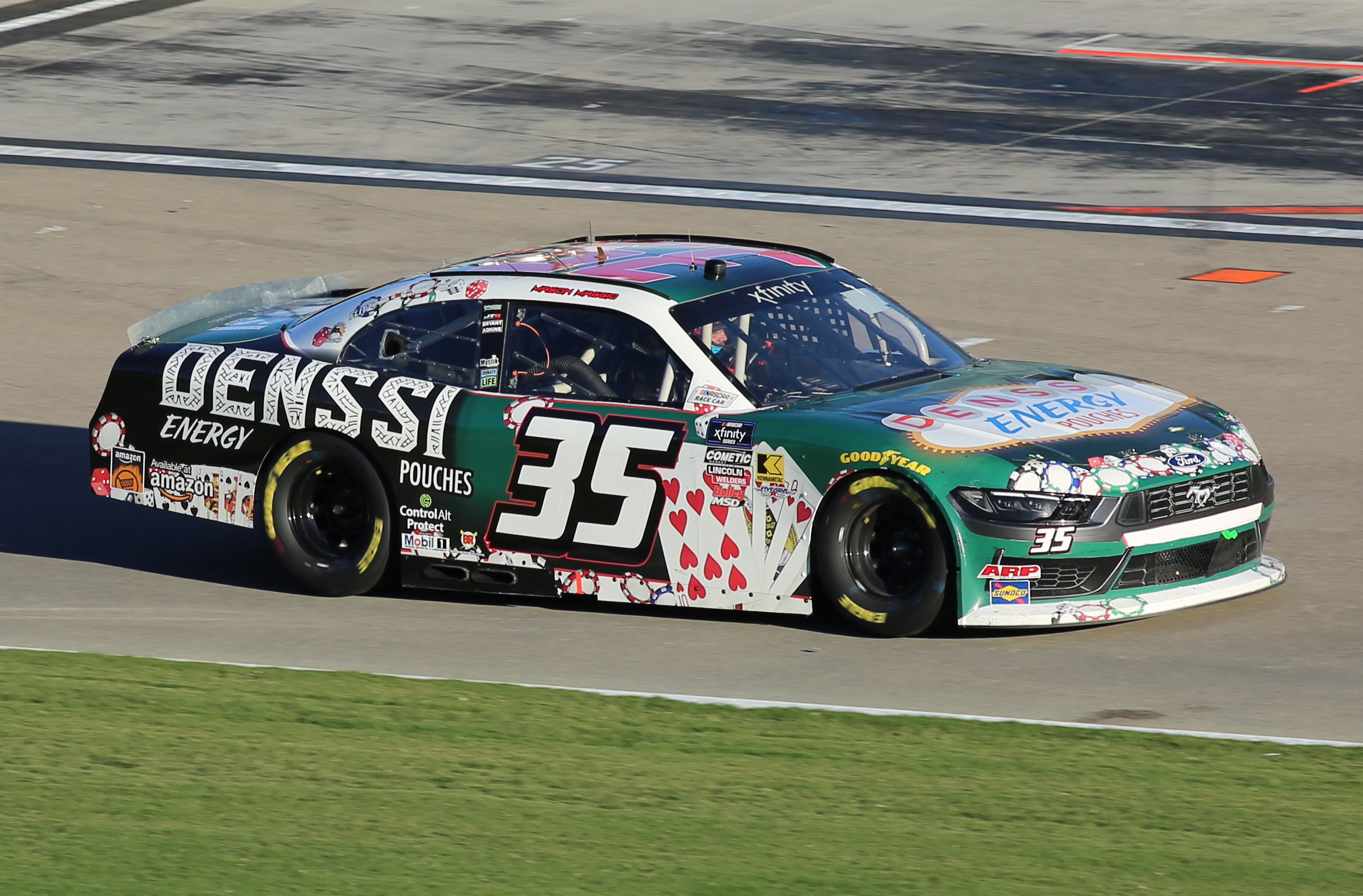
Maggio's No. 35 car at Las Vegas Motor Speedway in 2025

In 2025, Maggio competed part-time for Joey Gase Motorsports with Scott Osteen, MBM Motorsports and DGM Racing with Jesse Iwuji Motorsports respectively.

Maggio (No. 92) and Lavar Scott (No. 45) racing at Charlotte Motor Speedway in 2026.

In 2026, Maggio competed part-time for DGM Racing with Jesse Iwuji Motorsports.

== Motorsports career results ==
=== Racing career summary ===
Season	Series	Team	Races	Wins	Top 5	Top 10	Points	Position
2021	Carolina Pro Late Model Series	E33 Motorsports	1	0	1	1	N/A	51st
2022	Carolina Pro Late Model Series	E33 Motorsports	11	3	7	10	1159	**2nd**
2022	CARS Pro Late Model Tour	E33 Motorsports	1	0	0	0	21	49th
2022	NASCAR Camping World Truck Series	Reaume Brothers Racing	4	0	0	0	24	52nd
2022	NASCAR Camping World Truck Series	Peck Motorsports	0	0	0	0	24	52nd
2023	NASCAR Craftsman Truck Series	Young's Motorsports	1	0	0	0	53	39th
2023	NASCAR Craftsman Truck Series	Reaume Brothers Racing	2	0	0	0	53	39th
2023	NASCAR Craftsman Truck Series	AM Racing	3	0	0	0	53	39th
2023	NASCAR Xfinity Series	MBM Motorsports	2	0	0	0	0	NC†
2023	NASCAR Xfinity Series	SS-Greenlight Racing	2	0	0	0	0	NC†
2023	NASCAR Xfinity Series	RSS Racing	1	0	0	0	0	NC†
2024	NASCAR Craftsman Truck Series	Floridian Motorsports	1	0	0	0	105	34th
2024	NASCAR Craftsman Truck Series	Reaume Brothers Racing	10	0	0	0	105	34th
2024	NASCAR Xfinity Series	Joey Gase Motorsports	2	0	0	0	0	NC†
2024	NASCAR Xfinity Series	Alpha Prime Racing	1	0	0	0	0	NC†
2025	CARS Pro Late Model Tour	Rick Ware Racing	1	0	0	0	29	62nd
2025	NASCAR Craftsman Truck Series	Hettinger Racing	1	0	0	0	5	69th
2025	NASCAR Craftsman Truck Series	Reaume Brothers Racing	5	0	0	0	5	69th
2025	NASCAR Xfinity Series	Joey Gase Motorsports	11	0	0	0	0	NC†
2025	NASCAR Xfinity Series	MBM Motorsports	1	0	0	0	0	NC†
2026	NASCAR O'Reilly Auto Parts Series	DGM Racing with Jesse Iwuji Motorsports					TBD	TBD

^{†} As Maggio was a guest driver, he was ineligible for championship points.

=== NASCAR ===
(key) (Bold – Pole position awarded by qualifying time. Italics – Pole position earned by points standings or practice time. * – Most laps led. ** – All laps led.)

==== O'Reilly Auto Parts Series ====
NASCAR O'Reilly Auto Parts Series results
Year	Team	No.	Make	1	2	3	4	5	6	7	8	9	10	11	12	13	14	15	16	17	18	19	20	21	22	23	24	25	26	27	28	29	30	31	32	33	NOAPSC	Pts	Ref
2023	MBM Motorsports	66	Ford	DAY	CAL	LVS; DNQ	PHO	ATL	COA																												101st	0^{1}	
2023	MBM Motorsports	66	Toyota							RCH; 31	MAR	TAL	DOV	DAR	CLT	PIR; 36	SON	NSH	CSC																		101st	0^{1}	
2023	SS-Green Light Racing	07	Chevy																	ATL; 30	NHA	POC	ROA														101st	0^{1}	
2023	SS-Green Light Racing	08	Ford																					MCH; 37	IRC	GLN	DAY	DAR	KAN	BRI	TEX	ROV	LVS				101st	0^{1}	
2023	RSS Racing	29	Ford																															HOM; 33	MAR	PHO	101st	0^{1}	
2024	Joey Gase Motorsports	35	Chevy	DAY	ATL	LVS	PHO	COA	RCH	MAR	TEX	TAL	DOV	DAR	CLT	PIR	SON	IOW	NHA	NSH	CSC	POC	IND	MCH	DAY	DAR	ATL; 18	GLN	BRI	KAN	TAL	ROV	LVS				97th	0^{1}	
2024	Alpha Prime Racing	45	Chevy																															HOM; 31			97th	0^{1}	
2024	Joey Gase Motorsports	53	Ford																																MAR; 22	PHO	97th	0^{1}	
2025	Joey Gase Motorsports with Scott Osteen	53	Ford	DAY	ATL; 31	COA	PHO	LVS	HOM; 35	MAR; 25	DAR				TEX; 26	CLT	NSH; 28	MXC	POC	ATL; 27	CSC	SON	DOV	IND	IOW	GLN									MAR; 32	PHO	91st	0^{1}	
2025	Joey Gase Motorsports with Scott Osteen	53	Chevy									BRI; 38	CAR																								91st	0^{1}	
2025	MBM Motorsports	66	Chevy											TAL; 22																							91st	0^{1}	
2025	Joey Gase Motorsports with Scott Osteen	35	Chevy																								DAY; 15	PIR	GTW	BRI	KAN	ROV					91st	0^{1}	
2025	Joey Gase Motorsports with Scott Osteen	35	Ford																														LVS; 33				91st	0^{1}	
2025	DGM Racing with Jesse Iwuji Motorsports	91	Chevy																															TAL; 22			91st	0^{1}	
2026	DGM Racing with Jesse Iwuji Motorsports	91	Chevy	DAY; 38	ATL; 26	COA	PHO; 32	LVS; 28	DAR	MAR	CAR	BRI; 37	KAN; 33	TAL; 17	TEX; 32	GLN	DOV	CLT	NSH; 28	POC	COR	SON	CHI	ATL; 11	IND; 26		DAY; 19	DAR; 35	GTW; 21	BRI	LVS; 33			TAL; 12	MAR; 36	HOM; 36	32nd	183	
2026	DGM Racing with Jesse Iwuji Motorsports	92	Chevy																							IOW; 34						CLT; 26	PHO				32nd	183	

==== Craftsman Truck Series ====
NASCAR Craftsman Truck Series results
Year	Team	No.	Make	1	2	3	4	5	6	7	8	9	10	11	12	13	14	15	16	17	18	19	20	21	22	23	24	25	NCTC	Pts	Ref
2022	Reaume Brothers Racing	33	Chevy	DAY	LVS	ATL	COA	MAR	BRD	DAR	KAN	TEX	CLT	GTW; 27	SON	KNX	NSH	MOH	POC	IRP									52nd	24	
2022	Peck Motorsports	96	Chevy																		RCH; DNQ								52nd	24	
2022	Reaume Brothers Racing	43	Toyota																		RCH; 33				HOM; 32	PHO			52nd	24	
2022	Reaume Brothers Racing	33	Toyota																			KAN; 32	BRI	TAL					52nd	24	
2023	Young's Motorsports	20	Chevy	DAY	LVS	ATL; 35	COA	TEX	BRD	MAR																			39th	53	
2023	Reaume Brothers Racing	33	Ford								KAN; 27	DAR	NWS																39th	53	
2023	AM Racing	22	Ford											CLT; 25	GTW							KAN; 35	BRI	TAL	HOM; 27	PHO			39th	53	
2023	Reaume Brothers Racing	34	Ford													NSH; 20	MOH	POC	RCH	IRP	MLW								39th	53	
2024	Floridian Motorsports	21	Toyota	DAY; DNQ																			TAL; 18	HOM	MAR	PHO			34th	105	
2024	Floridian Motorsports	21	Ford		ATL; 24	LVS	BRI; 29	COA	MAR	TEX				CLT; 27	GTW	NSH; 35			RCH; 28		BRI; 31	KAN							34th	105	
2024	Reaume Brothers Racing	22	Ford								KAN; 29	DAR; 27	NWS				POC; 27	IRP		MLW; 27									34th	105	
2025	Hettinger Racing	4	Chevy	DAY; 15	ATL	LVS	HOM	MAR	BRI	CAR	TEX	KAN	NWS																69th	5	
2025	Reaume Brothers Racing	22	Ford											CLT; 28	NSH	MCH	POC	LRP	IRP	GLN	RCH							PHO; 32	69th	5	
2025	Reaume Brothers Racing	33	Ford																			DAR; 26	BRI; 31	NHA	ROV; 28	TAL	MAR		69th	5	

^{*} Season still in progress
^{1} Ineligible for series points

=== CARS Pro Late Model Tour ===
(key) (Bold – Pole position awarded by qualifying time. Italics – Pole position earned by points standings or practice time. * – Most laps led. ** – All laps led.)

CARS Pro Late Model Tour results
Year	Team	No.	Make	1	2	3	4	5	6	7	8	9	10	11	12	13	CPLMTC	Pts	Ref
2022	E33 Motorsports	51	Ford	CRW	HCY	GPS; 12	FCS	TCM	HCY	ACE	MMS	TCM	ACE	SBO	CRW		49th	21	
2025	Rick Ware Racing	51	Ford	AAS; 13	CDL	OCS	ACE	NWS	CRW	HCY	HCY	AND	FLC	SBO	TCM	NWS	62nd	29	

=== Carolina Pro Late Model Series ===
(key) (Bold – Pole position awarded by qualifying time. Italics – Pole position earned by points standings or practice time. * – Most laps led. ** – All laps led.)

Carolina Pro Late Model Series results
Year	Team	No.	Make	1	2	3	4	5	6	7	8	9	10	11	12	13	CPLMSC	Pts	Ref
2021	E33 Motorsports	51	Ford	HCY	HCY	OCS	FLC	HCY	CCS	FCS	DIL	HCY	OCS	HCY	SNM; 3		51st	N/A	
2022	E33 Motorsports	51	Ford	SNM; 3	FCS; 1*	HCY; 8	AAS; 1	DIL; 4	MMS; 1*	OCS; 13	CCS; 2	HCY; 8	HCY; 8	AND; 4	OCS	HCY	2nd	1159	
