= 2025 Tennessee Lottery 250 =

14th race of the 2025 NASCAR Xfinity Series

Race details
- Race 14 of 33 of the 2025 NASCAR Xfinity Series
- Date: May 31, 2025
- Official name: 5th Annual Tennessee Lottery 250
- Location: Nashville Superspeedway in Lebanon, Tennessee
- Course: Permanent racing facility
- Course length: 1.333 miles (2.145 km)
- Distance: 188 laps, 250 mi (400 km)
- Scheduled distance: 188 laps, 250 mi (400 km)
- Average speed: 111.006 mph (178.647 km/h)

Pole position
Driver	William Sawalich	Joe Gibbs Racing
- Time: 30.860

Most laps led
Driver	Justin Allgaier	JR Motorsports
- Laps: 101

Winner
No. 7	Justin Allgaier	JR Motorsports

Television in the United States
- Network: The CW
- Announcers: Adam Alexander, Parker Kligerman, and Austin Cindric

Radio in the United States
- Radio: PRN

The 2025 Tennessee Lottery 250 was the 14th stock car race of the 2025 NASCAR Xfinity Series, and the 5th iteration of the event. The race was held on Saturday, May 31, 2025, at Nashville Superspeedway in Lebanon, Tennessee, a 1.333 miles (2.145 km) permanent tri-oval shaped intermediate racetrack. The race took the scheduled 188 laps to complete.

In dominating fashion, Justin Allgaier, driving for JR Motorsports, would ultimately sweep the entire race, winning both stages, leading a race-high 101 laps, and earning the fastest lap of the event to score his 28th career NASCAR Xfinity Series win, and his third of the season. To fill out the podium, Connor Zilisch, driving for JR Motorsports, and Sam Mayer, driving for Haas Factory Team, would finish 2nd and 3rd, respectively.

== Report ==
=== Background ===
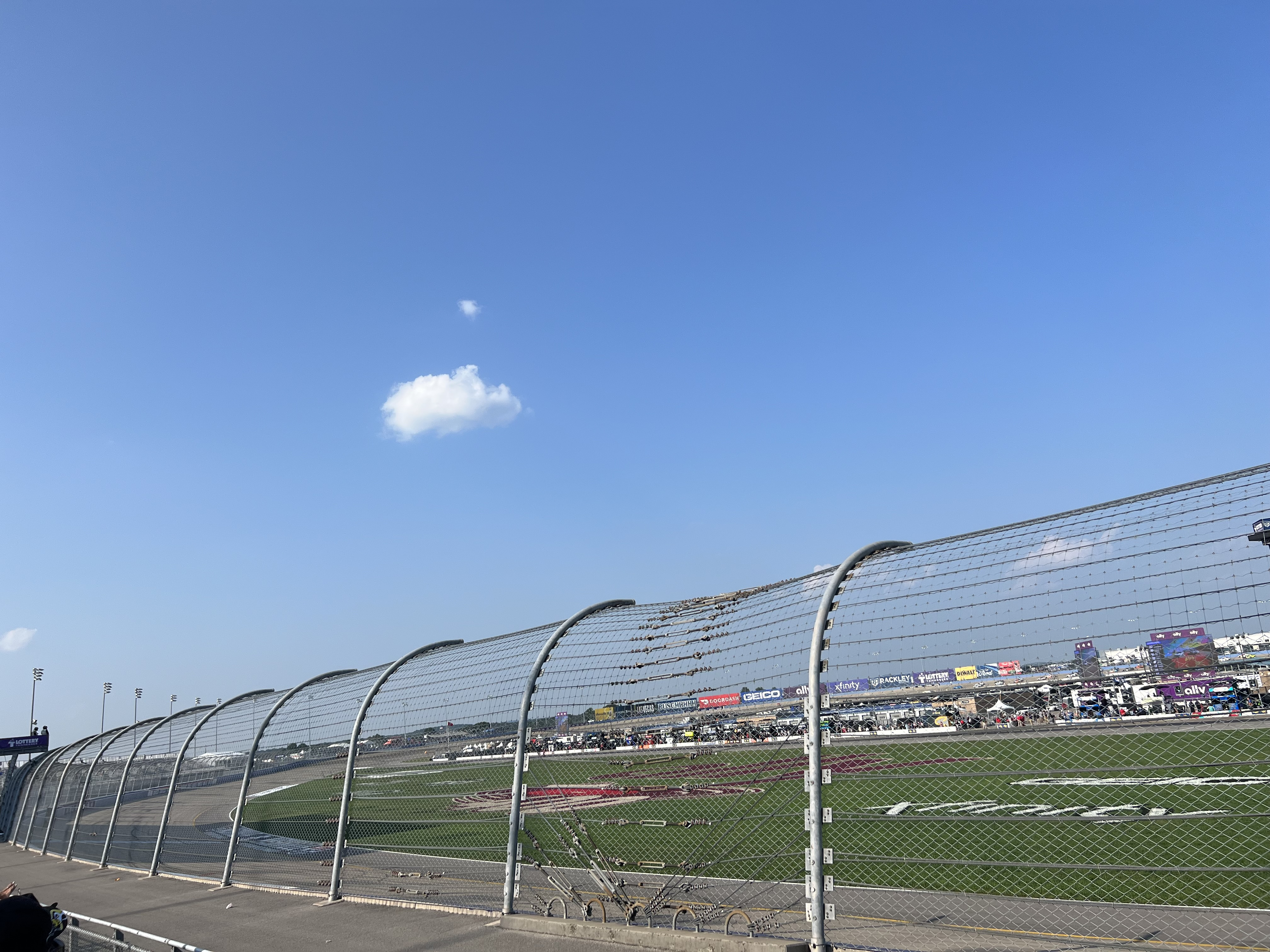
Nashville Superspeedway, the track where the race was held.

Nashville Superspeedway is a motor racing complex located in Lebanon, Tennessee, United States, about 30 miles (48 km) southeast of Nashville. The track was built in 2001 and is currently used for events, driving schools and GT Academy, a reality television competition.

It is a concrete oval track 1 1/3 miles (2.146 km) long. Nashville Superspeedway is owned by Speedway Motorsports, which also owns many other NASCAR tracks. Nashville Superspeedway was the longest concrete oval in NASCAR during the time it was on the NASCAR Xfinity Series and NASCAR Craftsman Truck Series circuits. Current permanent seating capacity is approximately 25,000. Additional portable seats are brought in for some events, and seating capacity can be expanded to 150,000. Infrastructure is in place to expand the facility to include a short track, drag strip, and road course.

==== Entry list ====
- (R) denotes rookie driver.
- (i) denotes driver who is ineligible for series driver points.

#	Driver	Team	Make
00	Sheldon Creed	Haas Factory Team	Ford
1	Carson Kvapil (R)	JR Motorsports	Chevrolet
2	Jesse Love	Richard Childress Racing	Chevrolet
4	Parker Retzlaff	Alpha Prime Racing	Chevrolet
5	Kris Wright	Our Motorsports	Chevrolet
07	Nick Leitz	SS-Green Light Racing	Chevrolet
7	Justin Allgaier	JR Motorsports	Chevrolet
8	Sammy Smith	JR Motorsports	Chevrolet
9	Ross Chastain (i)	JR Motorsports	Chevrolet
10	Daniel Dye (R)	Kaulig Racing	Chevrolet
11	Josh Williams	Kaulig Racing	Chevrolet
14	Logan Bearden	SS-Green Light Racing	Chevrolet
16	Christian Eckes (R)	Kaulig Racing	Chevrolet
17	Corey Day	Hendrick Motorsports	Chevrolet
18	William Sawalich (R)	Joe Gibbs Racing	Toyota
19	Aric Almirola	Joe Gibbs Racing	Toyota
20	Brandon Jones	Joe Gibbs Racing	Toyota
21	Austin Hill	Richard Childress Racing	Chevrolet
24	Jeffrey Earnhardt	Sam Hunt Racing	Toyota
25	Harrison Burton	AM Racing	Ford
26	Dean Thompson (R)	Sam Hunt Racing	Toyota
27	Jeb Burton	Jordan Anderson Racing	Chevrolet
28	Kyle Sieg	RSS Racing	Ford
31	Blaine Perkins	Jordan Anderson Racing	Chevrolet
32	Katherine Legge (i)	Jordan Anderson Racing	Chevrolet
35	Glen Reen	Joey Gase Motorsports	Chevrolet
39	Ryan Sieg	RSS Racing	Ford
41	Sam Mayer	Haas Factory Team	Ford
42	Anthony Alfredo	Young's Motorsports	Chevrolet
44	Brennan Poole	Alpha Prime Racing	Chevrolet
45	Mason Massey	Alpha Prime Racing	Chevrolet
48	Nick Sanchez (R)	Big Machine Racing	Chevrolet
51	Jeremy Clements	Jeremy Clements Racing	Chevrolet
53	Mason Maggio	Joey Gase Motorsports	Ford
54	Taylor Gray (R)	Joe Gibbs Racing	Toyota
70	Thomas Annunziata	Cope Family Racing	Chevrolet
71	Ryan Ellis	DGM Racing	Chevrolet
88	Connor Zilisch (R)	JR Motorsports	Chevrolet
91	Myatt Snider	DGM Racing	Chevrolet
99	Matt DiBenedetto	Viking Motorsports	Chevrolet
Official entry list

== Practice ==
For practice, drivers were separated into two groups, A and B. Both sessions were 25 minutes long, and was held on Saturday, May 31, at 1:05 PM CST. Kyle Sieg, driving for RSS Racing, would set the fastest time between both sessions, with a lap of 31.109, and a speed of 153.910 mph (247.694 km/h).

Pos.	#	Driver	Team	Make	Time	Speed
1	28	Kyle Sieg	RSS Racing	Ford	31.109	153.910
2	8	Sammy Smith	JR Motorsports	Chevrolet	31.122	153.846
3	10	Daniel Dye (R)	Kaulig Racing	Chevrolet	31.357	152.693
Full practice results

== Qualifying ==
Qualifying was held on Saturday, May 31, at 2:10 PM CST. Since Nashville Superspeedway is an intermediate racetrack, the qualifying procedure used is a single-car, one-lap system with one round. Drivers will be on track by themselves and will have one lap to post a qualifying time, and whoever sets the fastest time will win the pole.

William Sawalich, driving for Joe Gibbs Racing, would score the pole for the race, with a lap of 30.860, and a speed of 155.152 mph (249.693 km/h).

Two drivers failed to qualify: Glen Reen and Katherine Legge.

=== Qualifying results ===
Pos.	#	Driver	Team	Make	Time	Speed
1	18	William Sawalich (R)	Joe Gibbs Racing	Toyota	30.860	155.152
2	21	Austin Hill	Richard Childress Racing	Chevrolet	30.944	154.731
3	41	Sam Mayer	Haas Factory Team	Ford	30.991	154.496
4	7	Justin Allgaier	JR Motorsports	Chevrolet	31.025	154.327
5	00	Sheldon Creed	Haas Factory Team	Ford	31.034	154.282
6	1	Carson Kvapil (R)	JR Motorsports	Chevrolet	31.116	153.876
7	48	Nick Sanchez (R)	Big Machine Racing	Chevrolet	31.142	153.747
8	19	Aric Almirola	Joe Gibbs Racing	Toyota	31.151	153.703
9	9	Ross Chastain (i)	JR Motorsports	Chevrolet	31.223	153.348
10	88	Connor Zilisch (R)	JR Motorsports	Chevrolet	31.224	153.344
11	39	Ryan Sieg	RSS Racing	Ford	31.233	153.299
12	16	Christian Eckes (R)	Kaulig Racing	Chevrolet	31.240	153.265
13	20	Brandon Jones	Joe Gibbs Racing	Toyota	31.272	153.108
14	8	Sammy Smith	JR Motorsports	Chevrolet	31.294	153.001
15	2	Jesse Love	Richard Childress Racing	Chevrolet	31.299	152.976
16	27	Jeb Burton	Jordan Anderson Racing	Chevrolet	31.314	152.903
17	25	Harrison Burton	AM Racing	Ford	31.327	152.839
18	51	Jeremy Clements	Jeremy Clements Racing	Chevrolet	31.344	152.757
19	10	Daniel Dye (R)	Kaulig Racing	Chevrolet	31.357	152.693
20	26	Dean Thompson (R)	Sam Hunt Racing	Toyota	31.391	152.528
21	17	Corey Day	Hendrick Motorsports	Chevrolet	31.398	152.494
22	99	Matt DiBenedetto	Viking Motorsports	Chevrolet	31.406	152.455
23	42	Anthony Alfredo	Young's Motorsports	Chevrolet	31.421	152.382
24	54	Taylor Gray (R)	Joe Gibbs Racing	Toyota	31.426	152.358
25	71	Ryan Ellis	DGM Racing	Chevrolet	31.442	152.280
26	11	Josh Williams	Kaulig Racing	Chevrolet	31.478	152.106
27	31	Blaine Perkins	Jordan Anderson Racing	Chevrolet	31.512	151.942
28	28	Kyle Sieg	RSS Racing	Ford	31.600	151.519
29	4	Parker Retzlaff	Alpha Prime Racing	Chevrolet	31.746	150.822
30	70	Thomas Annunziata	Cope Family Racing	Chevrolet	31.758	150.765
31	44	Brennan Poole	Alpha Prime Racing	Chevrolet	31.771	150.703
32	53	Mason Maggio	Joey Gase Motorsports	Ford	31.778	150.670
Qualified by owner's points
33	07	Nick Leitz	SS-Green Light Racing	Chevrolet	31.836	150.396
34	24	Jeffrey Earnhardt	Sam Hunt Racing	Toyota	31.898	150.103
35	5	Kris Wright	Our Motorsports	Chevrolet	31.899	150.099
36	91	Myatt Snider	DGM Racing	Chevrolet	31.983	149.705
37	14	Logan Bearden	SS-Green Light Racing	Chevrolet	32.047	149.406
38	45	Mason Massey	Alpha Prime Racing	Chevrolet	32.509	147.282
Failed to qualify
39	35	Glen Reen	Joey Gase Motorsports	Chevrolet	31.818	150.481
40	32	Katherine Legge (i)	Jordan Anderson Racing	Chevrolet	31.987	149.686
Official qualifying results
Official starting lineup

== Race results ==
Stage 1 Laps: 45

Pos.	#	Driver	Team	Make	Pts
1	7	Justin Allgaier	JR Motorsports	Chevrolet	10
2	51	Jeremy Clements	Jeremy Clements Racing	Chevrolet	9
3	99	Matt DiBenedetto	Viking Motorsports	Chevrolet	8
4	21	Austin Hill	Richard Childress Racing	Chevrolet	7
5	10	Daniel Dye (R)	Kaulig Racing	Chevrolet	6
6	00	Sheldon Creed	Haas Factory Team	Ford	5
7	41	Sam Mayer	Haas Factory Team	Ford	4
8	1	Carson Kvapil (R)	JR Motorsports	Chevrolet	3
9	20	Brandon Jones	Joe Gibbs Racing	Toyota	2
10	88	Connor Zilisch (R)	JR Motorsports	Chevrolet	1

Stage 2 Laps: 45

Pos.	#	Driver	Team	Make	Pts
1	7	Justin Allgaier	JR Motorsports	Chevrolet	10
2	00	Sheldon Creed	Haas Factory Team	Ford	9
3	19	Aric Almirola	Joe Gibbs Racing	Toyota	8
4	88	Connor Zilisch (R)	JR Motorsports	Chevrolet	7
5	9	Ross Chastain (i)	JR Motorsports	Chevrolet	0
6	41	Sam Mayer	Haas Factory Team	Ford	5
7	21	Austin Hill	Richard Childress Racing	Chevrolet	4
8	1	Carson Kvapil (R)	JR Motorsports	Chevrolet	3
9	16	Christian Eckes (R)	Kaulig Racing	Chevrolet	2
10	10	Daniel Dye (R)	Kaulig Racing	Chevrolet	1

Stage 3 Laps: 98

Fin	St	#	Driver	Team	Make	Laps	Led	Status	Pts
1	4	7	Justin Allgaier	JR Motorsports	Chevrolet	188	101	Running	61
2	10	88	Connor Zilisch (R)	JR Motorsports	Chevrolet	188	18	Running	43
3	3	41	Sam Mayer	Haas Factory Team	Ford	188	0	Running	43
4	5	00	Sheldon Creed	Haas Factory Team	Ford	188	25	Running	47
5	9	9	Ross Chastain (i)	JR Motorsports	Chevrolet	188	0	Running	0
6	8	19	Aric Almirola	Joe Gibbs Racing	Toyota	188	0	Running	39
7	2	21	Austin Hill	Richard Childress Racing	Chevrolet	188	0	Running	41
8	15	2	Jesse Love	Richard Childress Racing	Chevrolet	188	0	Running	29
9	19	10	Daniel Dye (R)	Kaulig Racing	Chevrolet	188	3	Running	35
10	6	1	Carson Kvapil (R)	JR Motorsports	Chevrolet	188	0	Running	33
11	14	8	Sammy Smith	JR Motorsports	Chevrolet	188	0	Running	26
12	21	17	Corey Day	Hendrick Motorsports	Chevrolet	188	0	Running	25
13	17	25	Harrison Burton	AM Racing	Ford	188	0	Running	24
14	13	20	Brandon Jones	Joe Gibbs Racing	Toyota	188	3	Running	25
15	7	48	Nick Sanchez (R)	Big Machine Racing	Chevrolet	188	0	Running	22
16	16	27	Jeb Burton	Jordan Anderson Racing	Chevrolet	188	0	Running	21
17	31	44	Brennan Poole	Alpha Prime Racing	Chevrolet	188	0	Running	20
18	26	11	Josh Williams	Kaulig Racing	Chevrolet	188	0	Running	19
19	18	51	Jeremy Clements	Jeremy Clements Racing	Chevrolet	188	1	Running	27
20	34	24	Jeffrey Earnhardt	Sam Hunt Racing	Toyota	188	0	Running	17
21	30	70	Thomas Annunziata	Cope Family Racing	Chevrolet	187	0	Running	16
22	11	39	Ryan Sieg	RSS Racing	Ford	187	0	Running	15
23	36	91	Myatt Snider	DGM Racing	Chevrolet	187	0	Running	14
24	37	14	Logan Bearden	SS-Green Light Racing	Chevrolet	187	0	Running	13
25	38	45	Mason Massey	Alpha Prime Racing	Chevrolet	187	0	Running	12
26	24	54	Taylor Gray (R)	Joe Gibbs Racing	Toyota	187	0	Running	11
27	28	28	Kyle Sieg	RSS Racing	Ford	187	0	Running	10
28	33	07	Nick Leitz	SS-Green Light Racing	Chevrolet	187	0	Running	9
29	32	53	Mason Maggio	Joey Gase Motorsports	Ford	187	0	Running	8
30	23	42	Anthony Alfredo	Young's Motorsports	Chevrolet	187	0	Running	7
31	27	31	Blaine Perkins	Jordan Anderson Racing	Chevrolet	187	0	Running	6
32	35	5	Kris Wright	Our Motorsports	Chevrolet	187	0	Running	5
33	22	99	Matt DiBenedetto	Viking Motorsports	Chevrolet	186	0	Running	12
34	20	26	Dean Thompson (R)	Sam Hunt Racing	Toyota	184	0	Running	3
35	1	18	William Sawalich (R)	Joe Gibbs Racing	Toyota	163	37	Engine	2
36	12	16	Christian Eckes (R)	Kaulig Racing	Chevrolet	98	0	Accident	3
37	25	71	Ryan Ellis	DGM Racing	Chevrolet	98	0	Accident	1
38	29	4	Parker Retzlaff	Alpha Prime Racing	Chevrolet	35	0	Accident	1
Official race results

== Standings after the race ==
Drivers' Championship standings

	Pos	Driver	Points
	1	Justin Allgaier	583
	2	Austin Hill	491 (–92)
	3	Sam Mayer	472 (–111)
	4	Jesse Love	432 (–151)
1	5	Connor Zilisch	394 (–189)
4	6	Sheldon Creed	380 (–203)
1	7	Carson Kvapil	378 (–205)
3	8	Brandon Jones	377 (–206)
	9	Jeb Burton	364 (–219)
3	10	Ryan Sieg	364 (–219)
	11	Harrison Burton	347 (–236)
	12	Nick Sanchez	342 (–241)
Official driver's standings

Manufacturers' Championship standings

Pos	Manufacturer	Points
1	Chevrolet	550
2	Toyota	460 (–90)
3	Ford	444 (–106)

- Note: Only the first 12 positions are included for the driver standings.

Previous race: 2025 BetMGM 300	NASCAR Xfinity Series; 2025 season	Next race: 2025 The Chilango 150
