= 2025 Focused Health 250 (Atlanta) =

17th race of the 2025 NASCAR Xfinity Series

Race details
- Race 17 of 33 of the 2025 NASCAR Xfinity Series
- Date: June 27–28, 2025
- Official name: 5th Annual Focused Health 250
- Location: EchoPark Speedway in Hampton, Georgia
- Course: Permanent racing facility
- Course length: 1.54 miles (2.48 km)
- Distance: 163 laps, 251 mi (404 km)
- Scheduled distance: 163 laps, 251 mi (404 km)
- Average speed: 96.402 mph (155.144 km/h)

Pole position
Driver	Sheldon Creed	Haas Factory Team
- Time: 32.107

Most laps led
Driver	Aric Almirola	Joe Gibbs Racing
- Laps: 48

Winner
No. 48	Nick Sanchez	Big Machine Racing

Television in the United States
- Network: The CW
- Announcers: Adam Alexander, Kyle Busch, and Jamie McMurray

Radio in the United States
- Radio: PRN

The 2025 Focused Health 250 was the 17th stock car race of the 2025 NASCAR Xfinity Series, and the 5th iteration of the event. After a long red flag delay for lightning strikes, the first two stages of the race were held on Friday, June 27, 2025, with the final stage ending on Saturday, June 28. The race was held at EchoPark Speedway in Hampton, Georgia, a 1.54 miles (2.48 km) permanent asphalt quad-oval shaped intermediate speedway (with superspeedway rules). The race took the scheduled 163 laps to complete.

In a wreck-filled race, Nick Sanchez, driving for Big Machine Racing, would grab the lead on the final restart and held off the rest of the field to earn his first career NASCAR Xfinity Series win. To fill out the podium, Carson Kvapil, driving for JR Motorsports, and Sam Mayer, driving for Haas Factory Team, would finish 2nd and 3rd, respectively.

== Report ==
=== Background ===
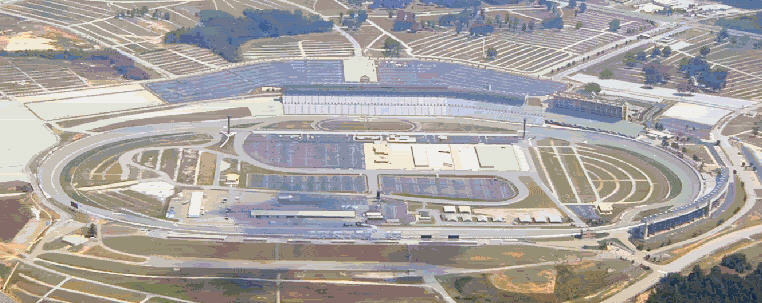
EchoPark Speedway, the track where the race will be held.

EchoPark Speedway (commonly referred to as Atlanta Motor Speedway) is a 1.54-mile race track in Hampton, Georgia, United States, 20 miles (32 km) south of Atlanta. It has annually hosted NASCAR Xfinity Series stock car races since 1992.

The venue was bought by Speedway Motorsports in 1990. In 1994, 46 condominiums were built over the northeastern side of the track. In 1997, to standardize the track with Speedway Motorsports' other two intermediate ovals, the entire track was almost completely rebuilt. The frontstretch and backstretch were swapped, and the configuration of the track was changed from oval to quad-oval, with a new official length of 1.54-mile (2.48 km) where before it was 1.522-mile (2.449 km). The project made the track one of the fastest on the NASCAR circuit. In July 2021 NASCAR announced that the track would be reprofiled for the 2022 season to have 28 degrees of banking and would be narrowed from 55 to 40 feet which the track claims will turn racing at the track similar to restrictor plate superspeedways. Despite the reprofiling being criticized by drivers, construction began in August 2021 and wrapped up in December 2021. The track has seating capacity of 71,000 to 125,000 people depending on the tracks configuration.

==== Entry list ====
- (R) denotes rookie driver.
- (i) denotes driver who is ineligible for series driver points.

#	Driver	Team	Make
00	Sheldon Creed	Haas Factory Team	Ford
1	Carson Kvapil (R)	JR Motorsports	Chevrolet
2	Jesse Love	Richard Childress Racing	Chevrolet
4	Parker Retzlaff	Alpha Prime Racing	Chevrolet
5	Kris Wright	Our Motorsports	Chevrolet
07	Nick Leitz	SS-Green Light Racing	Chevrolet
7	Justin Allgaier	JR Motorsports	Chevrolet
8	Sammy Smith	JR Motorsports	Chevrolet
10	Daniel Dye (R)	Kaulig Racing	Chevrolet
11	Josh Williams	Kaulig Racing	Chevrolet
14	Garrett Smithley	SS-Green Light Racing	Chevrolet
16	Christian Eckes (R)	Kaulig Racing	Chevrolet
18	William Sawalich (R)	Joe Gibbs Racing	Toyota
19	Aric Almirola	Joe Gibbs Racing	Toyota
20	Brandon Jones	Joe Gibbs Racing	Toyota
21	Austin Hill	Richard Childress Racing	Chevrolet
24	Patrick Staropoli	Sam Hunt Racing	Toyota
25	Harrison Burton	AM Racing	Ford
26	Dean Thompson (R)	Sam Hunt Racing	Toyota
27	Jeb Burton	Jordan Anderson Racing	Chevrolet
28	Kyle Sieg	RSS Racing	Ford
31	Blaine Perkins	Jordan Anderson Racing	Chevrolet
32	Katherine Legge (i)	Jordan Anderson Racing	Chevrolet
35	Joey Gase	Joey Gase Motorsports	Chevrolet
39	Ryan Sieg	RSS Racing	Ford
41	Sam Mayer	Haas Factory Team	Ford
42	Anthony Alfredo	Young's Motorsports	Chevrolet
44	Brennan Poole	Alpha Prime Racing	Chevrolet
45	Mason Massey	Alpha Prime Racing	Chevrolet
48	Nick Sanchez (R)	Big Machine Racing	Chevrolet
51	Jeremy Clements	Jeremy Clements Racing	Chevrolet
53	Mason Maggio	Joey Gase Motorsports	Ford
54	Taylor Gray (R)	Joe Gibbs Racing	Toyota
70	Leland Honeyman	Cope Family Racing	Chevrolet
71	Ryan Ellis	DGM Racing	Chevrolet
88	Connor Zilisch (R)	JR Motorsports	Chevrolet
91	C. J. McLaughlin	DGM Racing	Chevrolet
99	Matt DiBenedetto	Viking Motorsports	Chevrolet
Official entry list

== Qualifying ==
Qualifying was held on Friday, June 27, at 3:00 PM EST. Since EchoPark Speedway is an intermediate racetrack with superspeedway rules, the qualifying procedure used is a single-car, single-lap system with two rounds. In the first round, drivers have one lap to set a time. The fastest ten drivers from the first round move on to the second round. Whoever sets the fastest time in Round 2 will win the pole.

Due to lightning strikes in the area, only one round of qualifying was contested. Sheldon Creed, driving for Haas Factory Team, would score the pole for the race, with a lap of 32.107, and a speed of 172.673 mph (277.890 km/h).

No drivers would fail to qualify.

=== Qualifying results ===
Pos.	#	Driver	Team	Make	Time	Speed
1	00	Sheldon Creed	Haas Factory Team	Ford	32.107	172.673
2	21	Austin Hill	Richard Childress Racing	Chevrolet	32.178	172.292
3	41	Sam Mayer	Haas Factory Team	Ford	32.190	172.227
4	20	Brandon Jones	Joe Gibbs Racing	Toyota	32.218	172.078
5	2	Jesse Love	Richard Childress Racing	Chevrolet	32.228	172.024
6	88	Connor Zilisch (R)	JR Motorsports	Chevrolet	32.269	171.806
7	54	Taylor Gray (R)	Joe Gibbs Racing	Toyota	32.270	171.800
8	91	C. J. McLaughlin	DGM Racing	Chevrolet	32.270	171.800
9	25	Harrison Burton	AM Racing	Ford	32.303	171.625
10	19	Aric Almirola	Joe Gibbs Racing	Toyota	32.310	171.588
11	48	Nick Sanchez (R)	Big Machine Racing	Chevrolet	32.322	171.524
12	18	William Sawalich (R)	Joe Gibbs Racing	Toyota	32.369	171.275
13	39	Ryan Sieg	RSS Racing	Ford	32.376	171.238
14	8	Sammy Smith	JR Motorsports	Chevrolet	32.422	170.995
15	31	Blaine Perkins	Jordan Anderson Racing	Chevrolet	32.429	170.958
16	7	Justin Allgaier	JR Motorsports	Chevrolet	32.447	170.863
17	16	Christian Eckes (R)	Kaulig Racing	Chevrolet	32.459	170.800
18	4	Parker Retzlaff	Alpha Prime Racing	Chevrolet	32.472	170.732
19	70	Leland Honeyman	Cope Family Racing	Chevrolet	32.479	170.695
20	24	Patrick Staropoli	Sam Hunt Racing	Toyota	32.494	170.616
21	28	Kyle Sieg	RSS Racing	Ford	32.522	170.469
22	10	Daniel Dye (R)	Kaulig Racing	Chevrolet	32.529	170.433
23	32	Katherine Legge (i)	Jordan Anderson Racing	Chevrolet	32.532	170.417
24	1	Carson Kvapil (R)	JR Motorsports	Chevrolet	32.534	170.406
25	42	Anthony Alfredo	Young's Motorsports	Chevrolet	32.540	170.375
26	51	Jeremy Clements	Jeremy Clements Racing	Chevrolet	32.585	170.140
27	27	Jeb Burton	Jordan Anderson Racing	Chevrolet	32.594	170.093
28	71	Ryan Ellis	DGM Racing	Chevrolet	32.595	170.087
29	26	Dean Thompson (R)	Sam Hunt Racing	Toyota	32.642	169.843
30	11	Josh Williams	Kaulig Racing	Chevrolet	32.652	169.791
31	5	Kris Wright	Our Motorsports	Chevrolet	32.673	169.681
32	44	Brennan Poole	Alpha Prime Racing	Chevrolet	32.759	169.236
Qualified by owner's points
33	99	Matt DiBenedetto	Viking Motorsports	Chevrolet	32.890	168.562
34	35	Joey Gase	Joey Gase Motorsports	Chevrolet	32.918	168.418
35	07	Nick Leitz	SS-Green Light Racing	Chevrolet	32.980	168.102
36	14	Garrett Smithley	SS-Green Light Racing	Chevrolet	33.075	167.619
37	45	Mason Massey	Alpha Prime Racing	Chevrolet	33.141	167.285
38	53	Mason Maggio	Joey Gase Motorsports	Ford	–	–
Official qualifying results
Official starting lineup

== Race results ==
Stage 1 Laps: 40

Pos.	#	Driver	Team	Make	Pts
1	54	Taylor Gray (R)	Joe Gibbs Racing	Toyota	10
2	41	Sam Mayer	Haas Factory Team	Ford	9
3	10	Daniel Dye (R)	Kaulig Racing	Chevrolet	8
4	48	Nick Sanchez (R)	Big Machine Racing	Chevrolet	7
5	16	Christian Eckes (R)	Kaulig Racing	Chevrolet	6
6	26	Dean Thompson (R)	Sam Hunt Racing	Toyota	5
7	44	Brennan Poole	Alpha Prime Racing	Chevrolet	4
8	99	Matt DiBenedetto	Viking Motorsports	Chevrolet	3
9	88	Connor Zilisch (R)	JR Motorsports	Chevrolet	2
10	1	Carson Kvapil (R)	JR Motorsports	Chevrolet	1

Stage 2 Laps: 40

Pos.	#	Driver	Team	Make	Pts
1	20	Brandon Jones	Joe Gibbs Racing	Toyota	10
2	2	Jesse Love	Richard Childress Racing	Chevrolet	9
3	1	Carson Kvapil (R)	JR Motorsports	Chevrolet	8
4	99	Matt DiBenedetto	Viking Motorsports	Chevrolet	7
5	44	Brennan Poole	Alpha Prime Racing	Chevrolet	6
6	26	Dean Thompson (R)	Sam Hunt Racing	Toyota	5
7	48	Nick Sanchez (R)	Big Machine Racing	Chevrolet	4
8	28	Kyle Sieg	RSS Racing	Ford	3
9	31	Blaine Perkins	Jordan Anderson Racing	Chevrolet	2
10	71	Ryan Ellis	DGM Racing	Chevrolet	1

Stage 3 Laps: 83

Fin	St	#	Driver	Team	Make	Laps	Led	Status	Pts
1	11	48	Nick Sanchez (R)	Big Machine Racing	Chevrolet	163	18	Running	51
2	24	1	Carson Kvapil (R)	JR Motorsports	Chevrolet	163	3	Running	46
3	3	41	Sam Mayer	Haas Factory Team	Ford	163	3	Running	43
4	6	88	Connor Zilisch (R)	JR Motorsports	Chevrolet	163	32	Running	38
5	7	54	Taylor Gray (R)	Joe Gibbs Racing	Toyota	163	14	Running	42
6	5	2	Jesse Love	Richard Childress Racing	Chevrolet	163	3	Running	39
7	10	19	Aric Almirola	Joe Gibbs Racing	Toyota	163	48	Running	30
8	22	10	Daniel Dye (R)	Kaulig Racing	Chevrolet	163	0	Running	37
9	21	28	Kyle Sieg	RSS Racing	Ford	163	0	Running	31
10	26	51	Jeremy Clements	Jeremy Clements Racing	Chevrolet	163	0	Running	27
11	29	26	Dean Thompson (R)	Sam Hunt Racing	Toyota	163	0	Running	37
12	19	70	Leland Honeyman	Cope Family Racing	Chevrolet	163	0	Running	28
13	9	25	Harrison Burton	AM Racing	Ford	163	0	Running	24
14	4	20	Brandon Jones	Joe Gibbs Racing	Toyota	163	5	Running	33
15	33	99	Matt DiBenedetto	Viking Motorsports	Chevrolet	163	0	Running	30
16	27	27	Jeb Burton	Jordan Anderson Racing	Chevrolet	163	0	Running	21
17	32	44	Brennan Poole	Alpha Prime Racing	Chevrolet	163	0	Running	30
18	34	35	Joey Gase	Joey Gase Motorsports	Chevrolet	163	0	Running	19
19	17	16	Christian Eckes (R)	Kaulig Racing	Chevrolet	163	0	Running	18
20	37	45	Mason Massey	Alpha Prime Racing	Chevrolet	163	0	Running	17
21	28	71	Ryan Ellis	DGM Racing	Chevrolet	163	0	Running	17
22	15	31	Blaine Perkins	Jordan Anderson Racing	Chevrolet	163	0	Running	17
23	36	14	Garrett Smithley	SS-Green Light Racing	Chevrolet	163	0	Running	14
24	35	07	Nick Leitz	SS-Green Light Racing	Chevrolet	163	0	Running	13
25	31	5	Kris Wright	Our Motorsports	Chevrolet	163	0	Running	12
26	2	21	Austin Hill	Richard Childress Racing	Chevrolet	158	0	Running	12
27	38	53	Mason Maggio	Joey Gase Motorsports	Ford	153	0	Running	10
28	8	91	C. J. McLaughlin	DGM Racing	Chevrolet	138	0	Accident	9
29	25	42	Anthony Alfredo	Young's Motorsports	Chevrolet	53	0	Accident	8
30	13	39	Ryan Sieg	RSS Racing	Ford	46	0	DVP	7
31	16	7	Justin Allgaier	JR Motorsports	Chevrolet	42	0	Accident	6
32	1	00	Sheldon Creed	Haas Factory Team	Ford	41	37	Accident	5
33	14	8	Sammy Smith	JR Motorsports	Chevrolet	40	0	Accident	4
34	23	32	Katherine Legge (i)	Jordan Anderson Racing	Chevrolet	40	0	Accident	0
35	20	24	Patrick Staropoli	Sam Hunt Racing	Toyota	40	0	Accident	2
36	12	18	William Sawalich (R)	Joe Gibbs Racing	Toyota	4	0	Accident	1
37	18	4	Parker Retzlaff	Alpha Prime Racing	Chevrolet	3	0	Accident	1
38	30	11	Josh Williams	Kaulig Racing	Chevrolet	3	0	Accident	1
Official race results

== Standings after the race ==
Drivers' Championship standings

	Pos	Driver	Points
	1	Justin Allgaier	624
1	2	Sam Mayer	561 (–63)
1	3	Austin Hill	548 (–76)
	4	Jesse Love	541 (–83)
	5	Connor Zilisch	526 (–98)
	6	Carson Kvapil	488 (–136)
	7	Brandon Jones	466 (–158)
4	8	Taylor Gray	453 (–171)
1	9	Jeb Burton	445 (–179)
4	10	Nick Sanchez	436 (–188)
2	11	Sheldon Creed	425 (–199)
2	12	Ryan Sieg	425 (–199)
Official driver's standings

Manufacturers' Championship standings

Pos	Manufacturer	Points
1	Chevrolet	665
2	Toyota	560 (–105)
3	Ford	539 (–126)

- Note: Only the first 12 positions are included for the driver standings.

Previous race: 2025 Explore the Pocono Mountains 250	NASCAR Xfinity Series; 2025 season	Next race: 2025 The Loop 110
