= 2024 North Carolina Education Lottery 200 =

11th race of the 2024 NASCAR Craftsman Truck Series

Race details
- Race 11 of 23 of the 2024 NASCAR Craftsman Truck Series
- Date: May 24, 2024
- Official name: 22nd Annual North Carolina Education Lottery 200
- Location: Charlotte Motor Speedway in Concord, North Carolina
- Course: Permanent racing facility
- Course length: 1.5 miles (2.4 km)
- Distance: 134 laps, 201 mi (323 km)
- Scheduled distance: 134 laps, 201 mi (323 km)
- Average speed: 114.132 mph (183.678 km/h)

Pole position
Driver	Tanner Gray	Tricon Garage
- Time: 30.296

Most laps led
Driver	Corey Heim	Tricon Garage
- Laps: 72

Winner
No. 2	Nick Sanchez	Rev Racing

Television in the United States
- Network: FS1
- Announcers: Adam Alexander, Carson Hocevar, Phil Parsons, and Michael Waltrip

Radio in the United States
- Radio: MRN

The 2024 North Carolina Education Lottery 200 was the 11th stock car race of the 2024 NASCAR Craftsman Truck Series, and the 22nd iteration of the event. The race was held on Friday, May 24, 2024, in Concord, North Carolina at Charlotte Motor Speedway, a 1.5 miles (2.4 km) permanent asphalt tri-oval shaped intermediate speedway. The race took the scheduled 134 laps to complete. In an action-packed race, Nick Sanchez, driving for Rev Racing, would steal the win from a dominating Corey Heim, holding him off in the final stages of the race to earn his second career NASCAR Craftsman Truck Series win, and his second of the season. Heim had dominated the majority of the race, who originally won both stages and lead a race-high 72 laps. To fill out the podium, Stewart Friesen, driving for Halmar Friesen Racing, and Grant Enfinger, driving for CR7 Motorsports, would finish 2nd and 3rd, respectively. Heim had originally finished in 2nd, but was disqualified following post-race inspection due to having three unsecured lug nuts. Heim was credited with a last place finish, and forfeited his stage wins, giving them to Kaden Honeycutt and Tanner Gray.

== Report ==
=== Background ===
Charlotte Motor Speedway, the circuit where the race was held.

The race was held at Charlotte Motor Speedway, located in Concord, North Carolina. The speedway complex includes a 1.5-mile (2.4 km) quad-oval track that was utilized for the race, as well as a dragstrip and a dirt track. The speedway was built in 1959 by Bruton Smith and is considered the home track for NASCAR with many race teams based in the Charlotte metropolitan area. The track is owned and operated by Speedway Motorsports Inc. (SMI) with Marcus G. Smith serving as track president.

==== Entry list ====
- (R) denotes rookie driver.

#	Driver	Team	Make
1	Brett Moffitt	Tricon Garage	Toyota
02	Mason Massey	Young's Motorsports	Chevrolet
2	Nick Sanchez	Rev Racing	Chevrolet
5	Dean Thompson	Tricon Garage	Toyota
7	Connor Mosack	Spire Motorsports	Chevrolet
9	Grant Enfinger	CR7 Motorsports	Chevrolet
10	Jennifer Jo Cobb	Jennifer Jo Cobb Racing	Chevrolet
11	Corey Heim	Tricon Garage	Toyota
13	Jake Garcia	ThorSport Racing	Ford
15	Tanner Gray	Tricon Garage	Toyota
17	Taylor Gray	Tricon Garage	Toyota
18	Tyler Ankrum	McAnally-Hilgemann Racing	Chevrolet
19	Christian Eckes	McAnally-Hilgemann Racing	Chevrolet
20	Memphis Villarreal	Young's Motorsports	Chevrolet
21	Mason Maggio	Floridian Motorsports	Ford
22	Keith McGee	Reaume Brothers Racing	Ford
25	Ty Dillon	Rackley WAR	Chevrolet
32	Bret Holmes	Bret Holmes Racing	Chevrolet
33	Lawless Alan	Reaume Brothers Racing	Ford
38	Layne Riggs (R)	Front Row Motorsports	Ford
41	Bayley Currey	Niece Motorsports	Chevrolet
42	Matt Mills	Niece Motorsports	Chevrolet
43	Daniel Dye	McAnally-Hilgemann Racing	Chevrolet
45	Kaden Honeycutt	Niece Motorsports	Chevrolet
46	Thad Moffitt (R)	Faction46	Chevrolet
52	Stewart Friesen	Halmar Friesen Racing	Toyota
56	Timmy Hill	Hill Motorsports	Toyota
66	Conner Jones (R)	ThorSport Racing	Ford
67	Jeffrey Earnhardt	MBM Motorsports	Toyota
71	Rajah Caruth	Spire Motorsports	Chevrolet
75	Stefan Parsons	Henderson Motorsports	Chevrolet
76	Spencer Boyd	Freedom Racing Enterprises	Chevrolet
77	Chase Purdy	Spire Motorsports	Chevrolet
88	Matt Crafton	ThorSport Racing	Ford
90	Justin Carroll	TC Motorsports	Toyota
91	Jack Wood	McAnally-Hilgemann Racing	Chevrolet
98	Ty Majeski	ThorSport Racing	Ford
99	Ben Rhodes	ThorSport Racing	Ford
Official entry list

== Practice ==
The first and only practice was held on Friday, May 24, at 1:35 PM EST, and would last for 20 minutes. Ty Majeski, driving for ThorSport Racing, would set the fastest time in the session, with a lap of 30.594, and a speed of 176.505 mph (284.057 km/h).

Pos.	#	Driver	Team	Make	Time	Speed
1	98	Ty Majeski	ThorSport Racing	Ford	30.594	176.505
2	91	Jack Wood	McAnally-Hilgemann Racing	Chevrolet	30.685	175.982
3	19	Christian Eckes	McAnally-Hilgemann Racing	Chevrolet	30.689	175.959
Full practice results

== Qualifying ==
Qualifying was held on Friday, May 24, at 2:05 PM EST. Since Charlotte Motor Speedway is an intermediate speedway, the qualifying system used is a single-car, one-lap system with only one round. Drivers will be on track by themselves and will have one lap to post a qualifying time. Whoever sets the fastest time in that round will win the pole.

Tanner Gray, driving for Tricon Garage, would score the pole for the race, with a lap of 30.296, and a speed of 178.241 mph (286.851 km/h).

Two drivers would fail to qualify: Justin Carroll and Jennifer Jo Cobb.

=== Qualifying results ===
Pos.	#	Driver	Team	Make	Time	Speed
1	15	Tanner Gray	Tricon Garage	Toyota	30.296	178.241
2	11	Corey Heim	Tricon Garage	Toyota	30.372	177.795
3	98	Ty Majeski	ThorSport Racing	Ford	30.400	177.632
4	71	Rajah Caruth	Spire Motorsports	Chevrolet	30.467	177.241
5	38	Layne Riggs (R)	Front Row Motorsports	Ford	30.502	177.038
6	77	Chase Purdy	Spire Motorsports	Chevrolet	30.522	176.922
7	7	Connor Mosack	Spire Motorsports	Chevrolet	30.582	176.574
8	91	Jack Wood	McAnally-Hilgemann Racing	Chevrolet	30.601	176.465
9	45	Kaden Honeycutt	Niece Motorsports	Chevrolet	30.602	176.459
10	41	Bayley Currey	Niece Motorsports	Chevrolet	30.633	176.280
11	5	Dean Thompson	Tricon Garage	Toyota	30.636	176.263
12	52	Stewart Friesen	Halmar Friesen Racing	Toyota	30.637	176.257
13	99	Ben Rhodes	ThorSport Racing	Ford	30.638	176.252
14	17	Taylor Gray	Tricon Garage	Toyota	30.649	176.188
15	42	Matt Mills	Niece Motorsports	Chevrolet	30.673	176.051
16	2	Nick Sanchez	Rev Racing	Chevrolet	30.710	175.838
17	9	Grant Enfinger	CR7 Motorsports	Chevrolet	30.722	175.770
18	13	Jake Garcia	ThorSport Racing	Ford	30.726	175.747
19	1	Brett Moffitt	Tricon Garage	Toyota	30.811	175.262
20	25	Ty Dillon	Rackley WAR	Chevrolet	30.923	174.627
21	33	Lawless Alan	Reaume Brothers Racing	Ford	31.000	174.194
22	88	Matt Crafton	ThorSport Racing	Ford	31.084	173.723
23	75	Stefan Parsons	Henderson Motorsports	Chevrolet	31.107	173.594
24	21	Mason Maggio	Floridian Motorsports	Ford	31.150	173.355
25	66	Conner Jones (R)	ThorSport Racing	Ford	31.261	172.739
26	56	Timmy Hill	Hill Motorsports	Toyota	31.395	172.002
27	32	Bret Holmes	Bret Holmes Racing	Chevrolet	31.404	171.953
28	20	Memphis Villarreal	Young's Motorsports	Chevrolet	31.687	170.417
29	02	Mason Massey	Young's Motorsports	Chevrolet	31.813	169.742
30	76	Spencer Boyd	Freedom Racing Enterprises	Chevrolet	31.869	169.444
31	67	Jeffrey Earnhardt	MBM Motorsports	Toyota	32.045	168.513
Qualified by owner's points
32	46	Thad Moffitt (R)	Faction46	Chevrolet	32.054	168.466
33	22	Keith McGee	Reaume Brothers Racing	Ford	32.356	166.893
34	18	Tyler Ankrum	McAnally-Hilgemann Racing	Chevrolet	50.510	106.910
35	19	Christian Eckes	McAnally-Hilgemann Racing	Chevrolet	–	–
36	43	Daniel Dye	McAnally-Hilgemann Racing	Chevrolet	–	–
Failed to qualify
37	90	Justin Carroll	TC Motorsports	Toyota	32.570	165.797
38	10	Jennifer Jo Cobb	Jennifer Jo Cobb Racing	Chevrolet	34.435	156.817
Official qualifying results
Official starting lineup

== Race results ==
Stage 1 Laps: 30

Pos.	#	Driver	Team	Make	Pts
1	45	Kaden Honeycutt	Niece Motorsports	Chevrolet	10
2	15	Tanner Gray	Tricon Garage	Toyota	9
3	71	Rajah Caruth	Spire Motorsports	Chevrolet	8
4	98	Ty Majeski	ThorSport Racing	Ford	7
5	38	Layne Riggs (R)	Front Row Motorsports	Ford	6
6	77	Chase Purdy	Spire Motorsports	Chevrolet	5
7	5	Dean Thompson	Tricon Garage	Toyota	4
8	99	Ben Rhodes	ThorSport Racing	Ford	3
9	7	Connor Mosack	Spire Motorsports	Chevrolet	2
10	41	Bayley Currey	Niece Motorsports	Chevrolet	1

Stage 2 Laps: 30

Pos.	#	Driver	Team	Make	Pts
1	15	Tanner Gray	Tricon Garage	Toyota	10
2	77	Chase Purdy	Spire Motorsports	Chevrolet	9
3	45	Kaden Honeycutt	Niece Motorsports	Chevrolet	8
4	5	Dean Thompson	Tricon Garage	Toyota	7
5	98	Ty Majeski	ThorSport Racing	Ford	6
6	38	Layne Riggs (R)	Front Row Motorsports	Ford	5
7	7	Connor Mosack	Spire Motorsports	Chevrolet	4
8	2	Nick Sanchez	Rev Racing	Chevrolet	3
9	43	Daniel Dye	McAnally-Hilgemann Racing	Chevrolet	2
10	17	Taylor Gray	Tricon Garage	Toyota	1

Stage 3 Laps: 74

Pos.	St	#	Driver	Team	Make	Laps	Led	Status	Pts
1	16	2	Nick Sanchez	Rev Racing	Chevrolet	134	9	Running	43
2	12	52	Stewart Friesen	Halmar Friesen Racing	Toyota	134	0	Running	35
3	17	9	Grant Enfinger	CR7 Motorsports	Chevrolet	134	0	Running	34
4	15	42	Matt Mills	Niece Motorsports	Chevrolet	134	0	Running	33
5	13	99	Ben Rhodes	ThorSport Racing	Ford	134	0	Running	35
6	18	13	Jake Garcia	ThorSport Racing	Ford	134	0	Running	31
7	9	45	Kaden Honeycutt	Niece Motorsports	Chevrolet	134	0	Running	48
8	7	7	Connor Mosack	Spire Motorsports	Chevrolet	134	0	Running	35
9	11	5	Dean Thompson	Tricon Garage	Toyota	134	0	Running	39
10	35	19	Christian Eckes	McAnally-Hilgemann Racing	Chevrolet	134	37	Running	27
11	25	66	Conner Jones (R)	ThorSport Racing	Ford	134	0	Running	26
12	14	17	Taylor Gray	Tricon Garage	Toyota	134	0	Running	26
13	6	77	Chase Purdy	Spire Motorsports	Chevrolet	134	5	Running	38
14	27	32	Bret Holmes	Bret Holmes Racing	Chevrolet	134	0	Running	23
15	19	1	Brett Moffitt	Tricon Garage	Toyota	134	0	Running	22
16	4	71	Rajah Caruth	Spire Motorsports	Chevrolet	134	0	Running	29
17	1	15	Tanner Gray	Tricon Garage	Toyota	134	11	Running	39
18	29	02	Mason Massey	Young's Motorsports	Chevrolet	134	0	Running	19
19	36	43	Daniel Dye	McAnally-Hilgemann Racing	Chevrolet	134	0	Running	20
20	30	76	Spencer Boyd	Freedom Racing Enterprises	Chevrolet	134	0	Running	17
21	8	91	Jack Wood	McAnally-Hilgemann Racing	Chevrolet	134	0	Running	16
22	26	56	Timmy Hill	Hill Motorsports	Toyota	134	0	Running	15
23	3	98	Ty Majeski	ThorSport Racing	Ford	134	0	Running	27
24	20	25	Ty Dillon	Rackley WAR	Chevrolet	134	0	Running	13
25	23	75	Stefan Parsons	Henderson Motorsports	Chevrolet	134	0	Running	12
26	10	41	Bayley Currey	Niece Motorsports	Chevrolet	134	0	Running	12
27	24	21	Mason Maggio	Floridian Motorsports	Ford	134	0	Running	10
28	5	38	Layne Riggs (R)	Front Row Motorsports	Ford	133	0	Running	20
29	28	20	Memphis Villarreal	Young's Motorsports	Chevrolet	131	0	Running	8
30	21	33	Lawless Alan	Reaume Brothers Racing	Ford	120	0	Brakes	7
31	22	88	Matt Crafton	ThorSport Racing	Ford	119	0	Running	6
32	34	18	Tyler Ankrum	McAnally-Hilgemann Racing	Chevrolet	67	0	Accident	5
33	32	46	Thad Moffitt (R)	Faction46	Chevrolet	65	0	Accident	4
34	33	22	Keith McGee	Reaume Brothers Racing	Ford	65	0	Accident	3
35	31	67	Jeffrey Earnhardt	MBM Motorsports	Toyota	65	0	Accident	2
DSQ	2	11	Corey Heim	Tricon Garage	Toyota	134	72	Disqualified	1
Official race results

== Standings after the race ==
Drivers' Championship standings

	Pos	Driver	Points
	1	Christian Eckes	453
	2	Corey Heim	423 (-30)
1	3	Nick Sanchez	403 (–50)
1	4	Ty Majeski	389 (–64)
	5	Taylor Gray	354 (–99)
1	6	Rajah Caruth	336 (–117)
1	7	Tyler Ankrum	320 (–133)
2	8	Tanner Gray	291 (–162)
1	9	Grant Enfinger	290 (–163)
1	10	Ben Rhodes	289 (–164)
Official driver's standings

Manufacturers' Championship standings

Pos	Manufacturer	Points
1	Chevrolet	423
2	Toyota	384 (-39)
3	Ford	350 (–73)

- Note: Only the first 10 positions are included for the driver standings.

Previous race: 2024 Wright Brand 250	NASCAR Craftsman Truck Series; 2024 season	Next race: 2024 Toyota 200
