= Nick Sanchez =

American racing driver (born 2001)

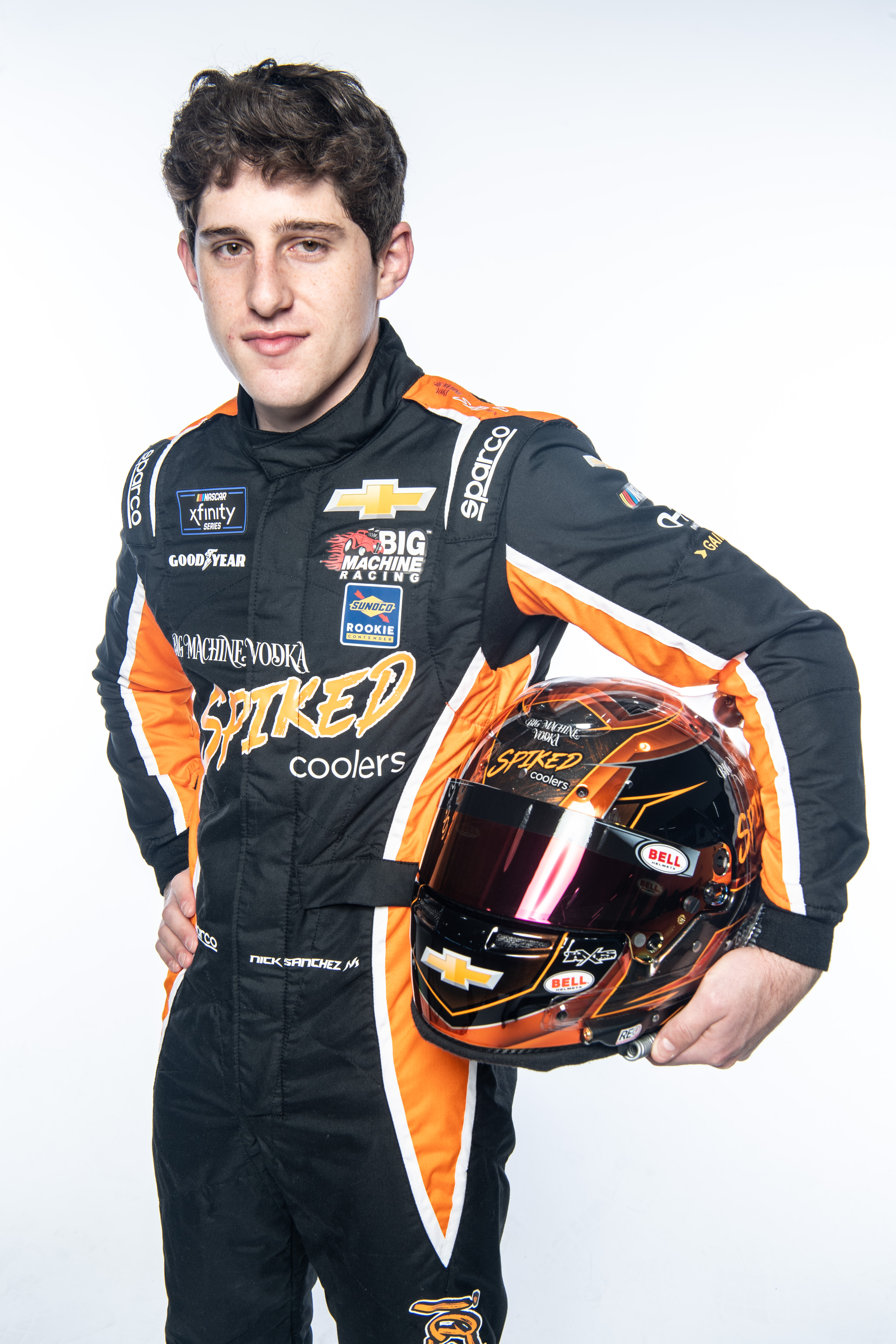
- Sanchez in 2025
- Born: Nicholas Anthony Sanchez; June 10, 2001 (age 25); Miami, Florida, U.S.
- Height: 5 ft 8 in (1.73 m)
- Weight: 156 lb (71 kg)
- Achievements: 2022 ARCA Menards Series Champion
- Awards: 2023 NASCAR Craftsman Truck Series Rookie of the Year

NASCAR O'Reilly Auto Parts Series career
- 59 races run over 3 years
- 2026 position: 74th
- Best finish: 11th (2025)
- First race: 2022 United Rentals 200 (Phoenix)
- Last race: 2026 O'Reilly Auto Parts 300 (Homestead)
- First win: 2025 Focused Health 250 (Atlanta)
Wins	Top tens	Poles
1	15	0

NASCAR FedEx Freight Truck Series career
- 51 races run over 4 years
- Truck no., team: No. 18 (McAnally-Hilgemann Racing)
- 2026 position: 43rd
- Best finish: 5th (2024)
- First race: 2023 NextEra Energy 250 (Daytona)
- Last race: 2026 Craftsman 200 (Homestead)
- First win: 2024 Fresh From Florida 250 (Daytona)
- Last win: 2024 North Carolina Education Lottery 200 (Charlotte)
Wins	Top tens	Poles
2	27	8

ARCA Menards Series career
- 42 races run over 3 years
- Best finish: 1st (2022)
- First race: 2020 General Tire 150 (Phoenix)
- Last race: 2022 Shore Lunch 200 (Toledo)
- First win: 2021 Reese's 150 (Kansas)
- Last win: 2022 Henry Ford Health 200 (Michigan)
Wins	Top tens	Poles
4	31	0

ARCA Menards Series East career
- 15 races run over 4 years
- Best finish: 3rd (2020)
- First race: 2019 Who'sYourDriver.org Twin 100's #1 (South Boston)
- Last race: 2022 Bush's Beans 200 (Bristol)
Wins	Top tens	Poles
0	10	1

ARCA Menards Series West career
- 3 races run over 2 years
- Best finish: 29th (2021)
- First race: 2021 General Tire 150 (Phoenix)
- Last race: 2022 General Tire 150 (Phoenix)
Wins	Top tens	Poles
0	2	0
- Statistics up to date as of November 7, 2026.

Nicholas Anthony Sanchez (born June 10, 2001) is an American professional stock car racing driver. He competes full-time in the NASCAR Truck Series, driving the No. 18 Chevrolet Silverado RST for McAnally–Hilgemann Racing. He is the 2022 ARCA Menards Series champion.

== Racing career ==
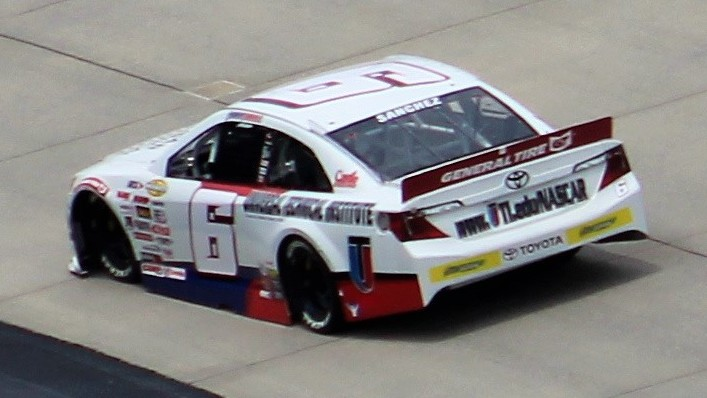
Sanchez's No. 6 car at Dover Motor Speedway in 2020

Sanchez began racing at the age of twelve in go-karts at his home track of Homestead–Miami Speedway.

Sanchez tried out for NASCAR's Drive for Diversity program and was accepted into it, and as a result, was given a ride with Rev Racing in the NASCAR Whelen All-American Series as well as the then-NASCAR K&N Pro Series East in 2019. He made his debut in both races of the doubleheader at South Boston Speedway and then made another start later in the year at New Hampshire. In only his second start in the series, Sanchez would win the pole for the second South Boston race.

Sanchez was also the recipient of the Wendell Scott Trailblazer Award in 2019.

When ARCA and NASCAR merged, the East Series and the ARCA Menards Series were brought together and rebranded in 2020, and Sanchez continued to compete for Rev Racing in the renamed ARCA Menards Series East. Sanchez became a full-time driver for the team in 2020, replacing Rubén García Jr. in the team's No. 6 car.

In 2021, Sanchez moved from the East Series to the main ARCA Menards Series, competing full-time in Rev's No. 2 car. (It was initially going to be the No. 6.) The team also switched from Toyota to Chevrolet that year. Sanchez got his first career ARCA win at Kansas in the season finale, while Ty Gibbs won the championship for that season.

On October 19, 2021, it was announced that Sanchez would be driving part-time in the NASCAR Xfinity Series for B. J. McLeod Motorsports while continuing to drive full-time for Rev Racing in the main ARCA Menards Series. He would first pilot the No. 5 Chevrolet at Phoenix Raceway, and at Charlotte Motor Speedway in the No. 99. He would later depart the team afterward to drive a partial schedule the No. 48 for Big Machine Racing starting at Bristol Motor Speedway. Sanchez would win three ARCA races (Talladega, Kansas, & Michigan) and the championship in 2022 by fourteen points over Daniel Dye.

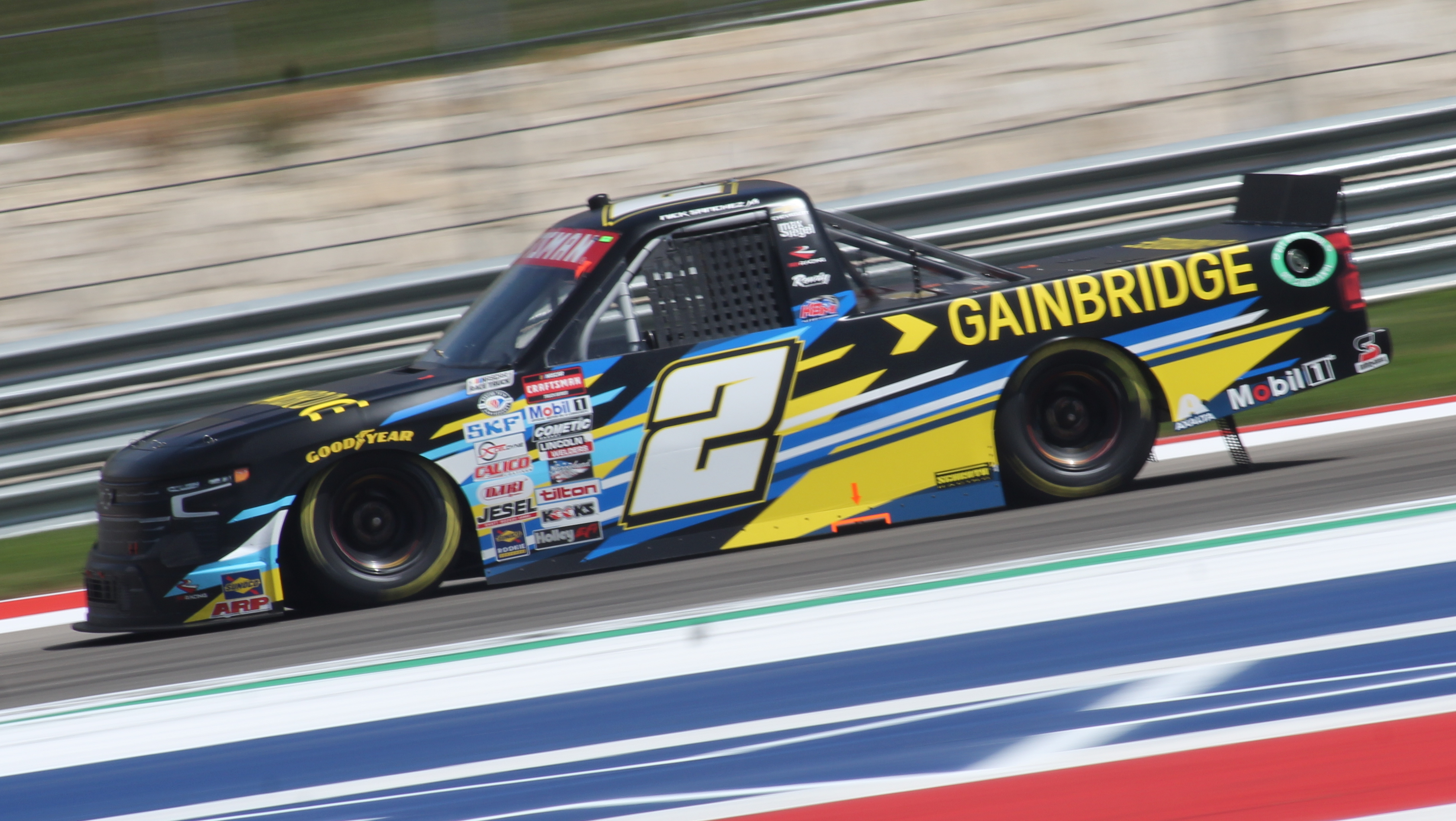
Sanchez in the No. 2 truck at the Circuit of the Americas in 2023

On November 4, 2022, Rev Racing announced its expansion into the NASCAR Craftsman Truck Series, fielding the No. 2 Chevrolet for Sanchez in 2023. His consistency made him the only rookie to make the playoffs in 2023. In addition, he won the NASCAR Rookie of the Year honors in the Truck Series. Following the Talladega fall race, Sanchez got into a fight with Matt Crafton in the garage area as a result of an on-track incident when both of their trucks made contact with each other, triggering a multi-truck pileup. Sanchez, with blood running down his face, yelled "I'm going to fucking kill you at Homestead. You fucked with the wrong guy motherfucker. It's on now." NASCAR fined Sanchez $5,000 and Crafton $25,000 for the fight. In addition, Sanchez's father Rene was suspended for two races for his involvement. Sanchez was eliminated at the conclusion of the Round of 8 at Homestead.

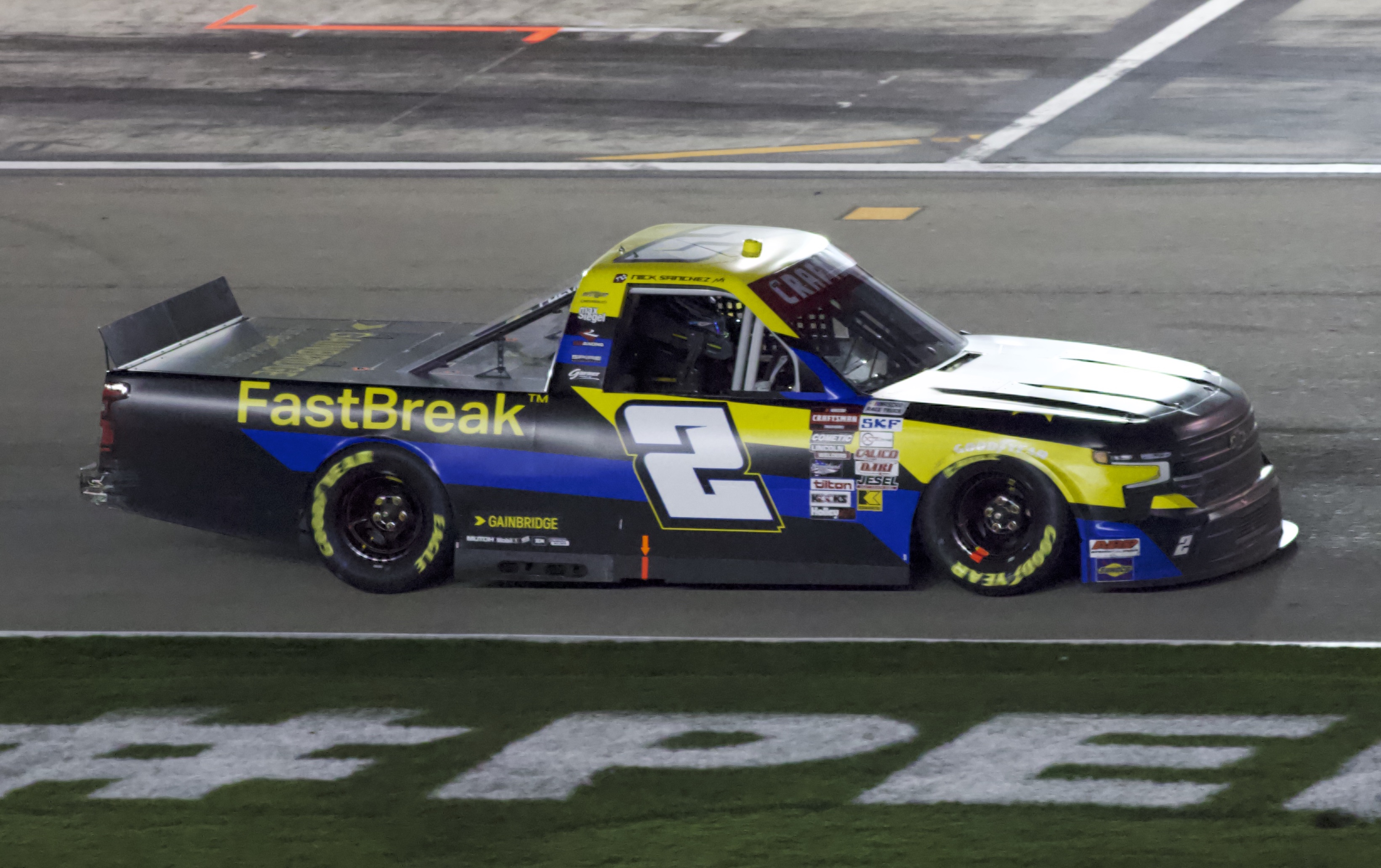
Sanchez's No. 2 truck at Las Vegas Motor Speedway in 2024.

Following the purchase of Rev Racing’s technical partner, Kyle Busch Motorsports by Spire Motorsports, it was announced that Sanchez would continue racing the No. 2 Silverado for Rev Racing for the 2024 season.

Sanchez began the 2024 season with his first career win at Daytona. Three months later, he scored his second win at Charlotte.

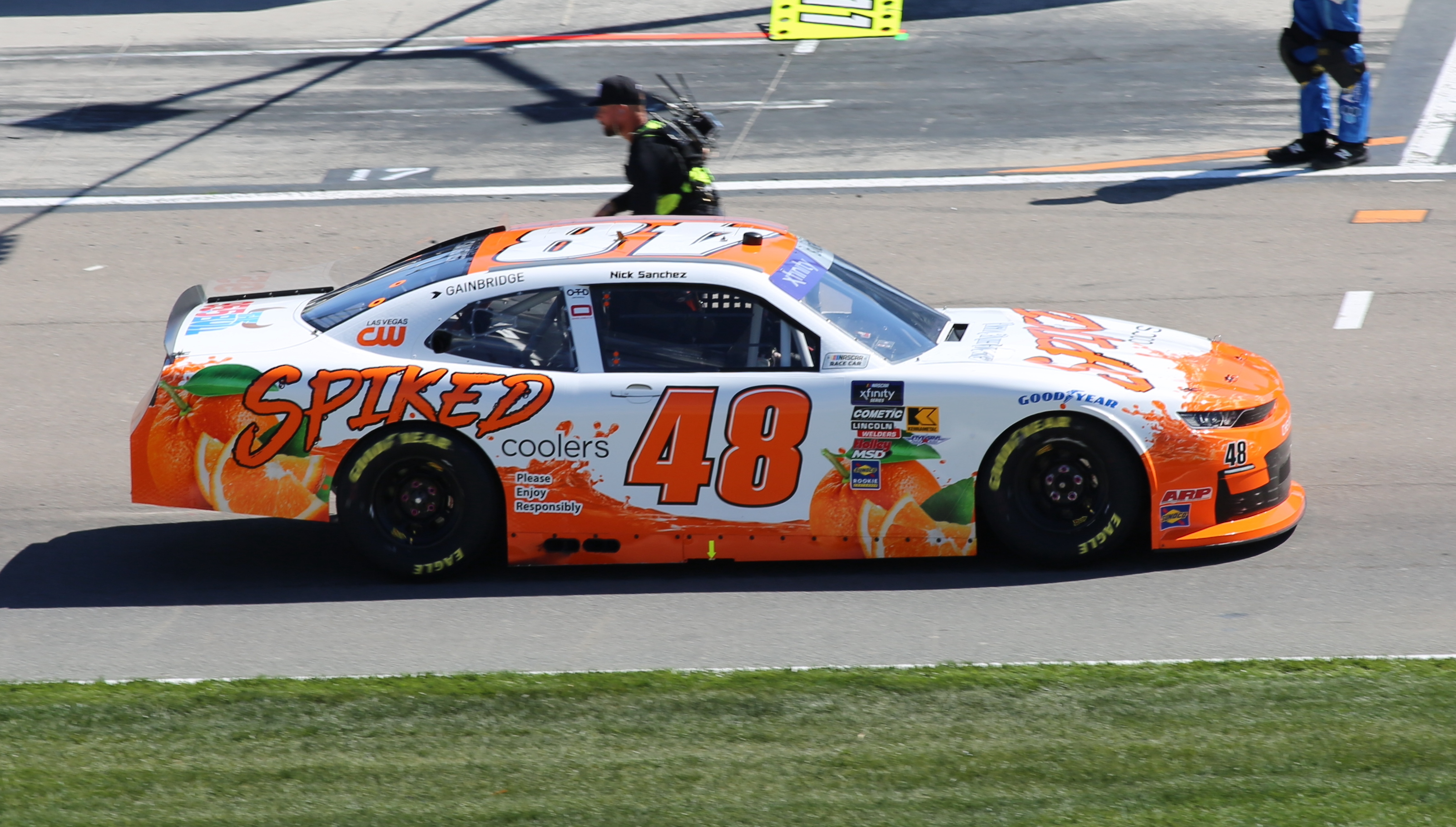
Sanchez's No. 48 car at Las Vegas Motor Speedway in 2025

In mid-September of that year, it was announced that Sanchez would return to the Xfinity Series and Big Machine Racing to drive their No. 48 car full-time, beginning for the following 2025 season. He started the season with a 35th-place DNF at Daytona. After staying consistent throughout the season, he earned his first career victory at Atlanta. Although originally announced that he would return to BMR for the 2026 season, on December 8, 2025, Sanchez announced he would not return to BMR.

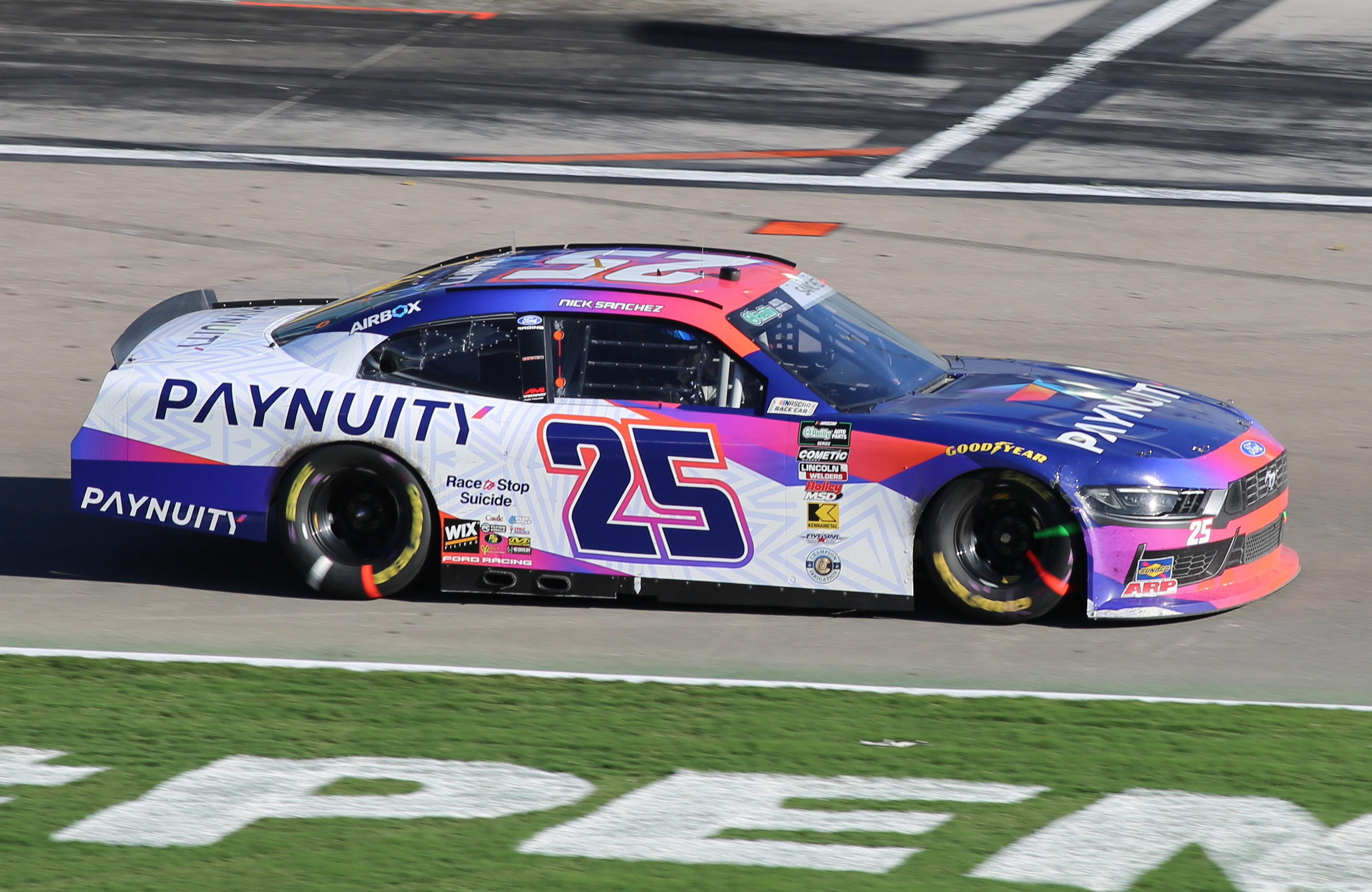
Sanchez's No. 25 car at Las Vegas Motor Speedway in 2026

On February 9, 2026, it was announced that Sanchez would join AM Racing and drive their No. 25 car full-time for the 2026 season. After the first seven races however, he and the team withdrew from the entry list at Rockingham Speedway, and was released after the team shut down the following month. In June of that year, it was announced that Sanchez will drive a partial schedule for Peterson Racing in the No. 87 Chevrolet, beginning at Pocono Raceway.

On November 12, 2026, it was announced that Sanchez would join McAnally–Hilgemann Racing and drive their No. 18 truck full-time for the 2027 season.

== Personal life ==
Sanchez's father immigrated to the United States from Cuba on the Mariel boatlift when he was eight years old.

When Sanchez began competing in NASCAR, he moved from Miami to Cornelius, North Carolina, which is located in the Charlotte metropolitan area, where the majority of NASCAR teams are based.

== Motorsports career results ==
=== Racing career summary ===
Season	Series	Team	Races	Wins	Top 5	Top 10	Points	Position
2019	NASCAR K&N Pro Series East	Rev Racing	3	0	0	2	103	21st
2020	ARCA Menards Series East	Rev Racing	6	0	2	4	309	**3rd**
2020	ARCA Menards Series	Rev Racing	4	0	0	2	135	28th
2021	ARCA Menards Series West	Rev Racing	2	0	1	1	63	29th
2021	ARCA Menards Series East	Rev Racing	3	0	2	2	161	13th
2021	ARCA Menards Series	Rev Racing	18	1	9	13	692	**3rd**
2022	ARCA Menards Series West	Rev Racing	1	0	0	1	37	51st
2022	ARCA Menards Series East	Rev Racing	3	0	1	2	158	10th
2022	ARCA Menards Series	Rev Racing	20	3	9	16	970	**1st**
2022	NASCAR Xfinity Series	B. J. McLeod Motorsports	2	0	0	0	156	35th
2022	NASCAR Xfinity Series	Big Machine Racing	6	0	0	1	156	35th
2023	NASCAR Craftsman Truck Series	Rev Racing	23	0	2	12	2258	6th
2024	NASCAR Craftsman Truck Series	Rev Racing	23	2	11	14	2280	5th
2025	NASCAR Craftsman Truck Series	Spire Motorsports	1	0	0	0	0	NC†
2025	NASCAR Xfinity Series	Big Machine Racing	33	1	7	12	2198	11th
2026	NASCAR Craftsman Truck Series	Spire Motorsports	2	0	1	1	40*	46th*
2026	NASCAR Craftsman Truck Series	Henderson Motorsports	1	0	0	0	40*	46th*
2026	NASCAR O'Reilly Auto Parts Series	AM Racing	7	0	1	1	0	NC†
2026	NASCAR O'Reilly Auto Parts Series	Peterson Racing	9	0	0	1	0	NC†

^{†} As Sanchez was a guest driver, he was ineligible for championship points.

=== NASCAR ===
(key) (Bold – Pole position awarded by qualifying time. Italics – Pole position earned by points standings or practice time. * – Most laps led.)

==== O'Reilly Auto Parts Series ====
NASCAR O'Reilly Auto Parts Series results
Year	Team	No.	Make	1	2	3	4	5	6	7	8	9	10	11	12	13	14	15	16	17	18	19	20	21	22	23	24	25	26	27	28	29	30	31	32	33	NOAPSC	Pts	Ref
2022	B. J. McLeod Motorsports	5	Chevy	DAY	CAL	LVS	PHO; 26	ATL	COA	RCH	MAR	TAL	DOV	DAR	TEX																						35th	156	
2022	B. J. McLeod Motorsports	99	Chevy													CLT; 28	PIR	NSH	ROA	ATL	NHA	POC	IRC	MCH	GLN	DAY	DAR	KAN									35th	156	
2022	Big Machine Racing	48	Chevy																										BRI; 29	TEX; 11	TAL	ROV	LVS; 12	HOM; 25	MAR; 7	PHO; 12	35th	156	
2025	Big Machine Racing	48	Chevy	DAY; 35	ATL; 5	COA; 24	PHO; 10	LVS; 20	HOM; 8	MAR; 32	DAR; 8	BRI; 16	CAR; 31	TAL; 15	TEX; 20	CLT; 3	NSH; 14	MXC; 31	POC; 28	ATL; 1	CSC; 5	SON; 4	DOV; 37	IND; 33	IOW; 19	GLN; 24	DAY; 23	PIR; 3	GTW; 25	BRI; 13	KAN; 8	ROV; 9	LVS; 5	TAL; 20	MAR; 19	PHO; 15	11th	2198	
2026	AM Racing	25	Ford	DAY; 36	ATL; 3	COA; 25	PHO; 35	LVS; 38	DAR; 16	MAR; 33	CAR; Wth	BRI	KAN	TAL	TEX	GLN	DOV	CLT	NSH																		74th	0^{1}	
2026	Peterson Racing	87	Chevy																	POC; 23	COR	SON	CHI; 12	ATL; 19	IND; 20	IOW; 6	DAY; 16	DAR; 14	GTW; 34	BRI; 16	LVS	CLT	PHO; 22	TAL	MAR	HOM; 16	74th	0^{1}	

==== Truck Series ====
NASCAR Truck Series results
Year	Team	No.	Make	1	2	3	4	5	6	7	8	9	10	11	12	13	14	15	16	17	18	19	20	21	22	23	24	25	NCTC	Pts	Ref
2023	Rev Racing	2	Chevy	**DAY**; 26	LVS; 30	ATL; 2	COA; 7	**TEX**; 16*	BRD; 18	MAR; 11	KAN; 6	DAR; 11	NWS; 30	CLT; 9	GTW; 8	**NSH**; 3	MOH; 9	**POC**; 19	RCH; 8	IRP; 11	MLW; 24	KAN; 8*	BRI; 9	TAL; 7*	**HOM**; 17	PHO; 10			6th	2258	
2024	Rev Racing	2	Chevy	DAY; 1*	ATL; 5	LVS; 17	BRI; 17	COA; 18	MAR; 4	**TEX**; 3	KAN; 6	**DAR**; 2	NWS; 7	CLT; 1	GTW; 3	NSH; 13	POC; 13	IRP; 10	RCH; 30	MLW; 4	BRI; 5	KAN; 12	TAL; 22	HOM; 13	MAR; 5	PHO; 4			5th	2280	
2025	Spire Motorsports	07	Chevy	DAY	ATL	LVS	HOM	MAR	BRI	CAR	TEX; 13	KAN	NWS	CLT	NSH	MCH	POC	LRP	IRP	GLN	RCH	DAR	BRI	NHA	ROV	TAL	MAR	PHO	93rd	0^{1}	
2026	Spire Motorsports	77	Chevy	DAY	ATL	STP	DAR	ROC	BRI	TEX	GLN	DOV	CLT	NSH	MCH	COR	LRP	NWS	IRP; 5	RCH	NHA		KAN; 28	CLT	PHO	TAL	MAR	**HOM**; 35	43rd	60	
2026	Henderson Motorsports	75	Chevy																			BRI; 20							43rd	60	
2027	McAnally–Hilgemann Racing	18	Chevy	DAY	ATL	STP	DAR	BRI	TEX	KAN	NWS	CLT	NSS	POC	MCH	LRP	ATL	IRP	BRI	BGS	MSP	NHA	KAN	CLT	PHO	TAL	MAR	HOM			

^{*} Season still in progress
^{1} Ineligible for series points

=== ARCA Menards Series ===
(key) (Bold – Pole position awarded by qualifying time. Italics – Pole position earned by points standings or practice time. * – Most laps led.)

ARCA Menards Series results
Year	Team	No.	Make	1	2	3	4	5	6	7	8	9	10	11	12	13	14	15	16	17	18	19	20	AMSC	Pts	Ref
2020	Rev Racing	6	Toyota	DAY	PHO; 6	TAL	POC	IRP	KEN	IOW	KAN	TOL	TOL	MCH	DRC	GTW; 14	L44	TOL; 10	BRI; 11	WIN	MEM	ISF	KAN	28th	135	
2021	Rev Racing	2	Chevy	DAY; 31	PHO; 21	TAL; 3	KAN; 9	TOL; 3	CLT; 5	MOH; 5	POC; 4	ELK; 6	BLN; 6	IOW; 5	WIN; 14	GLN; 8	MCH; 3	ISF	MLW; 12	DSF	BRI; 4	SLM; 17	KAN; 1	3rd	692	
2022	Rev Racing	2	Chevy	DAY; 20	PHO; 7	TAL; 1	KAN; 1	CLT; 8	IOW; 7	BLN; 6	ELK; 11	MOH; 11	POC; 2	IRP; 7	MCH; 1*	GLN; 2	ISF; 5	MLW; 5	DSF; 5	KAN; 2	BRI; 12	SLM; 6	TOL; 6	1st	970	

==== ARCA Menards Series East ====
ARCA Menards Series East results
Year	Team	No.	Make	1	2	3	4	5	6	7	8	9	10	11	12	AMSEC	Pts	Ref
2019	Rev Racing	2	Toyota	NSM	BRI	SBO; 14	**SBO**; 8	MEM	NHA	IOW	GLN	BRI	GTW	NHA; 8	DOV	21st	103	
2020	Rev Racing	6	Toyota	NSM; 4	TOL; 5	DOV; 16	TOL; 10	BRI; 11	FIF; 9							3rd	309	
2021	Rev Racing	2	Chevy	NSM	FIF	NSV	DOV	SNM	IOW; 5	MLW; 12	BRI; 4					13th	161	
2022	Rev Racing	2	Chevy	NSM	FIF	DOV	NSV	IOW; 7	MLW; 5	BRI; 12						10th	158	

==== ARCA Menards Series West ====
ARCA Menards Series West results
Year	Team	No.	Make	1	2	3	4	5	6	7	8	9	10	11	AMSWC	Pts	Ref
2021	Rev Racing	2	Chevy	PHO; 21	SON	IRW	CNS	IRW	PIR	LVS	AAS	PHO; 4			29th	63	
2022	Rev Racing	2	Chevy	PHO; 7	IRW	KCR	PIR	SON	IRW	EVG	PIR	AAS	LVS	PHO	51st	37	

Sporting positions
Preceded by Ty Gibbs	ARCA Menards Series Champion; 2022	Succeeded by Jesse Love
