= 2025 Explore the Pocono Mountains 250 =

16th race of the 2025 NASCAR Xfinity Series

Race details
- Race 16 of 33 of the 2025 NASCAR Xfinity Series
- Date: June 21, 2025
- Location: Pocono Raceway in Long Pond, Pennsylvania
- Course: Permanent racing facility
- Course length: 2.5 miles (4.0 km)
- Distance: 100 laps, 250 mi (402 km)
- Scheduled distance: 100 laps, 250 mi (402 km)
- Average speed: 103.722 mph (166.924 km/h)

Pole position
Driver	Chase Elliott	Hendrick Motorsports
- Time: 54.209

Most laps led
Driver	Chase Elliott	Hendrick Motorsports
- Laps: 38

Winner
No. 88	Connor Zilisch	JR Motorsports

Television in the United States
- Network: The CW
- Announcers: Adam Alexander, Ryan Blaney, and Jamie McMurray

Radio in the United States
- Radio: MRN

The 2025 Explore the Pocono Mountains 250 was the 16th stock car race of the 2025 NASCAR Xfinity Series, and the 10th iteration of the event. The race was held on Saturday, June 21, 2025, at Pocono Raceway in Long Pond, Pennsylvania, a 2.5 miles (4.0 km) permanent triangular-shaped racetrack. The race took the scheduled 100 laps to complete.

Connor Zilisch, driving for JR Motorsports, would make a late race pass on Jesse Love for the lead with four laps to go to earn his third career NASCAR Xfinity Series win, his second of the season, and his first win on an oval track. To fill out the podium, Christian Eckes, driving for Kaulig Racing, would finish in 3rd, respectively.

This marked the first win for Dale Earnhardt Jr. as a crew chief, filling in as a substitute for Mardy Lindley, who was serving a one-race suspension for improperly secured lugnuts found in post-race inspection at Nashville Superspeedway. Earnhardt would join a select group of history to win as both a driver and crew chief.

== Report ==
=== Background ===
Pocono Raceway, the track where the race will be held.

Pocono Raceway is a 2.5-mile (4.0 km) oval speedway located in Long Pond, Pennsylvania, which has hosted NASCAR racing annually since the early 1970s. Nicknamed "The Tricky Triangle", the speedway has three distinct corners and is known for high speeds along its lengthy straightaways.

From 1982 to 2019, the circuit had two race weekends. In 2020, the circuit was reduced to one race meeting of two races. The first race was moved to World Wide Technology Raceway near St. Louis starting in 2022.

==== Entry list ====
- (R) denotes rookie driver.
- (i) denotes driver who is ineligible for series driver points.

#	Driver	Team	Make
00	Sheldon Creed	Haas Factory Team	Ford
1	Carson Kvapil (R)	JR Motorsports	Chevrolet
2	Jesse Love	Richard Childress Racing	Chevrolet
4	Parker Retzlaff	Alpha Prime Racing	Chevrolet
5	Kris Wright	Our Motorsports	Chevrolet
07	Patrick Emerling (i)	SS-Green Light Racing	Chevrolet
7	Justin Allgaier	JR Motorsports	Chevrolet
8	Sammy Smith	JR Motorsports	Chevrolet
10	Daniel Dye (R)	Kaulig Racing	Chevrolet
11	Josh Williams	Kaulig Racing	Chevrolet
14	Garrett Smithley	SS-Green Light Racing	Chevrolet
16	Christian Eckes (R)	Kaulig Racing	Chevrolet
17	Chase Elliott (i)	Hendrick Motorsports	Chevrolet
18	William Sawalich (R)	Joe Gibbs Racing	Toyota
19	Justin Bonsignore	Joe Gibbs Racing	Toyota
20	Brandon Jones	Joe Gibbs Racing	Toyota
21	Austin Hill	Richard Childress Racing	Chevrolet
25	Harrison Burton	AM Racing	Ford
26	Dean Thompson (R)	Sam Hunt Racing	Toyota
27	Jeb Burton	Jordan Anderson Racing	Chevrolet
28	Kyle Sieg	RSS Racing	Ford
31	Blaine Perkins	Jordan Anderson Racing	Chevrolet
35	Carson Ware	Joey Gase Motorsports	Ford
39	Ryan Sieg	RSS Racing	Ford
41	Sam Mayer	Haas Factory Team	Ford
42	Anthony Alfredo	Young's Motorsports	Chevrolet
44	Brennan Poole	Alpha Prime Racing	Chevrolet
45	Mason Massey	Alpha Prime Racing	Chevrolet
48	Nick Sanchez (R)	Big Machine Racing	Chevrolet
51	Jeremy Clements	Jeremy Clements Racing	Chevrolet
53	Logan Bearden	Joey Gase Motorsports	Chevrolet
54	Taylor Gray (R)	Joe Gibbs Racing	Toyota
70	Leland Honeyman	Cope Family Racing	Chevrolet
71	Ryan Ellis	DGM Racing	Chevrolet
74	Dawson Cram	Mike Harmon Racing	Chevrolet
88	Connor Zilisch (R)	JR Motorsports	Chevrolet
91	Josh Bilicki	DGM Racing	Chevrolet
99	Matt DiBenedetto	Viking Motorsports	Chevrolet
Official entry list

== Practice ==
For practice, drivers were separated into two groups, A and B. Both sessions were 25 minutes long, and was held on Saturday, June 21, at 10:00 AM EST. Justin Allgaier, driving for JR Motorsports, would set the fastest time between both groups, with a lap of 55.138, and a speed of 163.227 mph (262.688 km/h).

Pos.	#	Driver	Team	Make	Time	Speed
1	7	Justin Allgaier	JR Motorsports	Chevrolet	55.138	163.227
2	20	Brandon Jones	Joe Gibbs Racing	Toyota	55.190	163.073
3	88	Connor Zilisch (R)	JR Motorsports	Chevrolet	55.194	163.061
Full practice results

== Qualifying ==
Qualifying was held on Saturday, June 21, at 11:05 AM EST. Standard intermediate track qualifying was in effect, although at Pocono, a hybrid road course qualifying rule was used. The timing line was set in the North Straight, exiting Turn 2, where cars exited pit road, drove two-thirds of a lap, then took the green flag at the timing line exiting Turn 2, and completing their lap there the next time by. Teams then immediately pitted the car, meaning only two laps were run. In addition, up to three cars could be at the track at one time, separated by considerable intervals (about 20 seconds) to ensure drafting was prohibited.

Chase Elliott, driving for Hendrick Motorsports, would score the pole for the race, with a lap of 54.209, and a speed of 166.024 mph (267.190 km/h).

No drivers would fail to qualify.

=== Qualifying results ===
Pos.	#	Driver	Team	Make	Time	Speed
1	17	Chase Elliott (i)	Hendrick Motorsports	Chevrolet	54.209	166.024
2	20	Brandon Jones	Joe Gibbs Racing	Toyota	54.370	165.532
3	48	Nick Sanchez (R)	Big Machine Racing	Chevrolet	54.414	165.399
4	18	William Sawalich (R)	Joe Gibbs Racing	Toyota	54.430	165.350
5	39	Ryan Sieg	RSS Racing	Ford	54.482	165.192
6	41	Sam Mayer	Haas Factory Team	Ford	54.525	165.062
7	54	Taylor Gray (R)	Joe Gibbs Racing	Toyota	54.531	165.044
8	7	Justin Allgaier	JR Motorsports	Chevrolet	54.584	164.883
9	88	Connor Zilisch (R)	JR Motorsports	Chevrolet	54.631	164.742
10	2	Jesse Love	Richard Childress Racing	Chevrolet	54.638	164.721
11	99	Matt DiBenedetto	Viking Motorsports	Chevrolet	54.728	164.450
12	00	Sheldon Creed	Haas Factory Team	Ford	54.746	164.396
13	8	Sammy Smith	JR Motorsports	Chevrolet	54.774	164.312
14	21	Austin Hill	Richard Childress Racing	Chevrolet	54.865	164.039
15	16	Christian Eckes (R)	Kaulig Racing	Chevrolet	55.072	163.422
16	25	Harrison Burton	AM Racing	Ford	55.081	163.396
17	19	Justin Bonsignore	Joe Gibbs Racing	Toyota	55.083	163.390
18	10	Daniel Dye (R)	Kaulig Racing	Chevrolet	55.112	163.304
19	44	Brennan Poole	Alpha Prime Racing	Chevrolet	55.120	163.280
20	27	Jeb Burton	Jordan Anderson Racing	Chevrolet	55.125	163.265
21	51	Jeremy Clements	Jeremy Clements Racing	Chevrolet	55.155	163.177
22	1	Carson Kvapil (R)	JR Motorsports	Chevrolet	55.231	162.952
23	4	Parker Retzlaff	Alpha Prime Racing	Chevrolet	55.428	162.373
24	71	Ryan Ellis	DGM Racing	Chevrolet	55.461	162.276
25	26	Dean Thompson (R)	Sam Hunt Racing	Toyota	55.482	162.215
26	11	Josh Williams	Kaulig Racing	Chevrolet	55.589	161.903
27	31	Blaine Perkins	Jordan Anderson Racing	Chevrolet	55.647	161.734
28	42	Anthony Alfredo	Young's Motorsports	Chevrolet	55.676	161.650
29	45	Mason Massey	Alpha Prime Racing	Chevrolet	55.862	161.111
30	5	Kris Wright	Our Motorsports	Chevrolet	56.045	160.585
31	91	Josh Bilicki	DGM Racing	Chevrolet	56.151	160.282
32	14	Garrett Smithley	SS-Green Light Racing	Chevrolet	56.625	158.940
Qualified by owner's points
33	35	Carson Ware	Joey Gase Motorsports	Ford	57.203	157.334
34	74	Dawson Cram	Mike Harmon Racing	Chevrolet	57.541	156.410
35	07	Patrick Emerling (i)	SS-Green Light Racing	Chevrolet	1:00.945	147.674
36	70	Leland Honeyman	Cope Family Racing	Chevrolet	1:40.496	89.556
37	28	Kyle Sieg	RSS Racing	Ford	–	–
38	53	Logan Bearden	Joey Gase Motorsports	Chevrolet	–	–
Official qualifying results
Official starting lineup

== Race results ==
Stage 1 Laps: 25

Pos.	#	Driver	Team	Make	Pts
1	20	Brandon Jones	Joe Gibbs Racing	Toyota	10
2	48	Nick Sanchez (R)	Big Machine Racing	Chevrolet	9
3	88	Connor Zilisch (R)	JR Motorsports	Chevrolet	8
4	39	Ryan Sieg	RSS Racing	Ford	7
5	16	Christian Eckes (R)	Kaulig Racing	Chevrolet	6
6	8	Sammy Smith	JR Motorsports	Chevrolet	5
7	18	William Sawalich (R)	Joe Gibbs Racing	Toyota	4
8	00	Sheldon Creed	Haas Factory Team	Ford	3
9	51	Jeremy Clements	Jeremy Clements Racing	Chevrolet	2
10	21	Austin Hill	Richard Childress Racing	Chevrolet	1

Stage 2 Laps: 25

Pos.	#	Driver	Team	Make	Pts
1	88	Connor Zilisch (R)	JR Motorsports	Chevrolet	10
2	54	Taylor Gray (R)	Joe Gibbs Racing	Toyota	9
3	48	Nick Sanchez (R)	Big Machine Racing	Chevrolet	8
4	2	Jesse Love	Richard Childress Racing	Chevrolet	7
5	16	Christian Eckes (R)	Kaulig Racing	Chevrolet	6
6	39	Ryan Sieg	RSS Racing	Ford	5
7	7	Justin Allgaier	JR Motorsports	Chevrolet	4
8	8	Sammy Smith	JR Motorsports	Chevrolet	3
9	1	Carson Kvapil (R)	JR Motorsports	Chevrolet	2
10	27	Jeb Burton	Jordan Anderson Racing	Chevrolet	1

Stage 3 Laps: 50

Fin	St	#	Driver	Team	Make	Laps	Led	Status	Pts
1	9	88	Connor Zilisch (R)	JR Motorsports	Chevrolet	100	34	Running	58
2	10	2	Jesse Love	Richard Childress Racing	Chevrolet	100	8	Running	42
3	15	16	Christian Eckes (R)	Kaulig Racing	Chevrolet	100	0	Running	46
4	1	17	Chase Elliott (i)	Hendrick Motorsports	Chevrolet	100	38	Running	0
5	5	39	Ryan Sieg	RSS Racing	Ford	100	0	Running	44
6	22	1	Carson Kvapil (R)	JR Motorsports	Chevrolet	100	0	Running	33
7	6	41	Sam Mayer	Haas Factory Team	Ford	100	1	Running	30
8	13	8	Sammy Smith	JR Motorsports	Chevrolet	100	0	Running	37
9	7	54	Taylor Gray (R)	Joe Gibbs Racing	Toyota	100	0	Running	37
10	8	7	Justin Allgaier	JR Motorsports	Chevrolet	100	10	Running	31
11	20	27	Jeb Burton	Jordan Anderson Racing	Chevrolet	100	0	Running	27
12	21	51	Jeremy Clements	Jeremy Clements Racing	Chevrolet	100	0	Running	27
13	28	42	Anthony Alfredo	Young's Motorsports	Chevrolet	100	0	Running	24
14	16	25	Harrison Burton	AM Racing	Ford	100	3	Running	23
15	26	11	Josh Williams	Kaulig Racing	Chevrolet	100	0	Running	22
16	19	44	Brennan Poole	Alpha Prime Racing	Chevrolet	100	0	Running	21
17	25	26	Dean Thompson (R)	Sam Hunt Racing	Toyota	100	0	Running	20
18	2	20	Brandon Jones	Joe Gibbs Racing	Toyota	100	6	Running	29
19	11	99	Matt DiBenedetto	Viking Motorsports	Chevrolet	100	0	Running	18
20	29	45	Mason Massey	Alpha Prime Racing	Chevrolet	100	0	Running	17
21	4	18	William Sawalich (R)	Joe Gibbs Racing	Toyota	100	0	Running	20
22	23	4	Parker Retzlaff	Alpha Prime Racing	Chevrolet	100	0	Running	15
23	31	91	Josh Bilicki	DGM Racing	Chevrolet	100	0	Running	14
24	36	70	Leland Honeyman	Cope Family Racing	Chevrolet	100	0	Running	13
25	37	28	Kyle Sieg	RSS Racing	Ford	100	0	Running	12
26	32	14	Garrett Smithley	SS-Green Light Racing	Chevrolet	100	0	Running	11
27	38	53	Logan Bearden	Joey Gase Motorsports	Chevrolet	100	0	Running	10
28	3	48	Nick Sanchez (R)	Big Machine Racing	Chevrolet	100	0	Running	26
29	27	31	Blaine Perkins	Jordan Anderson Racing	Chevrolet	100	0	Running	8
30	35	07	Patrick Emerling (i)	SS-Green Light Racing	Chevrolet	100	0	Running	0
31	18	10	Daniel Dye (R)	Kaulig Racing	Chevrolet	100	0	Running	6
32	24	71	Ryan Ellis	DGM Racing	Chevrolet	100	0	Running	5
33	34	74	Dawson Cram	Mike Harmon Racing	Chevrolet	99	0	Running	4
34	33	35	Carson Ware	Joey Gase Motorsports	Ford	99	0	Running	3
35	14	21	Austin Hill	Richard Childress Racing	Chevrolet	96	0	Running	3
36	12	00	Sheldon Creed	Haas Factory Team	Ford	88	0	Accident	4
37	30	5	Kris Wright	Our Motorsports	Chevrolet	69	0	Suspension	1
38	17	19	Justin Bonsignore	Joe Gibbs Racing	Toyota	7	0	Engine	1
Official race results

== Standings after the race ==
Drivers' Championship standings

	Pos	Driver	Points
	1	Justin Allgaier	618
	2	Austin Hill	536 (–82)
	3	Sam Mayer	518 (–100)
	4	Jesse Love	502 (–116)
	5	Connor Zilisch	488 (–130)
1	6	Carson Kvapil	442 (–176)
1	7	Brandon Jones	433 (–185)
1	8	Jeb Burton	424 (–194)
3	9	Sheldon Creed	420 (–198)
3	10	Ryan Sieg	418 (–200)
1	11	Sammy Smith	415 (–203)
	12	Taylor Gray	411 (–207)
Official driver's standings

Manufacturers' Championship standings

Pos	Manufacturer	Points
1	Chevrolet	625
2	Toyota	528 (–97)
3	Ford	505 (–120)

- Note: Only the first 12 positions are included for the driver standings.

Previous race: 2025 The Chilango 150	NASCAR Xfinity Series; 2025 season	Next race: 2025 Focused Health 250 (Atlanta)
