= 2025 The Chilango 150 =

15th race of the 2025 NASCAR Xfinity Series

Race details
- Race 15 of 33 of the 2025 NASCAR Xfinity Series
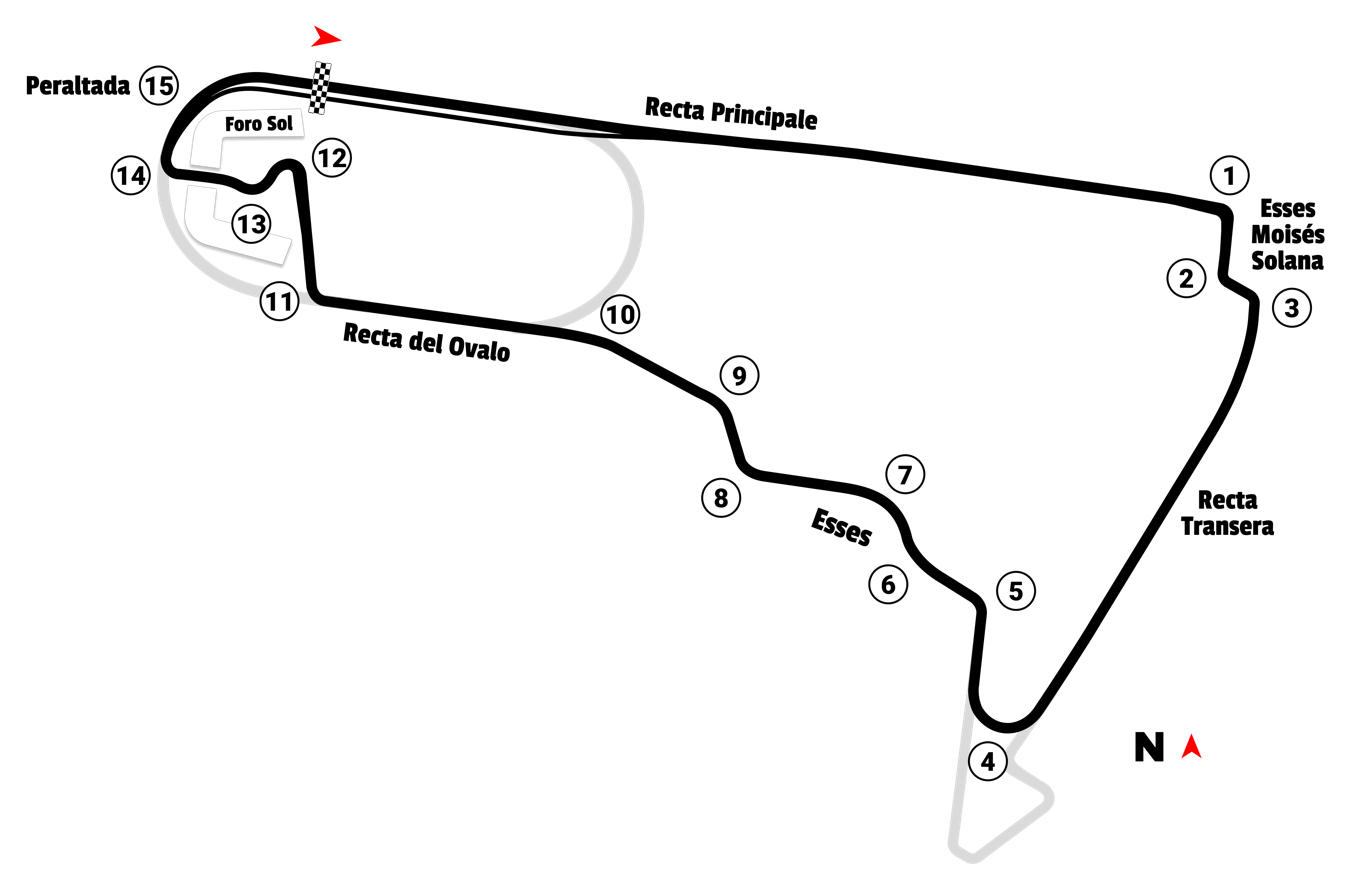
- Date: June 14, 2025
- Official name: 1st Annual The Chilango 150
- Location: Autódromo Hermanos Rodríguez in Mexico City, Mexico
- Course: Permanent racing facility
- Course length: 2.429 miles (3.890 km)
- Distance: 65 laps, 150 mi (300 km)
- Scheduled distance: 65 laps, 150 mi (300 km)
- Average speed: 69.278 mph (111.492 km/h)

Pole position
Driver	Connor Zilisch	JR Motorsports
- Time: 1:32.372

Most laps led
Driver	Daniel Suárez	JR Motorsports
- Laps: 19

Winner
No. 9	Daniel Suárez	JR Motorsports

Television in the United States
- Network: The CW
- Announcers: Adam Alexander, Ross Chastain, and Parker Kligerman

Radio in the United States
- Radio: MRN

The 2025 The Chilango 150 was the 15th stock car race of the 2025 NASCAR Xfinity Series, and the 1st iteration of the event since its return, and the fifth time overall. The race was held on Saturday, June 14, 2025, at the Autódromo Hermanos Rodríguez in Mexico City, Mexico, a 2.429 miles (3.909 km) permanent road course. The race took the scheduled 65 laps to complete.

Daniel Suárez, driving for JR Motorsports, won the race leading the final 19 laps and holding off Taylor Gray to earn his fourth career NASCAR Xfinity Series win, and his first of the season. Austin Hill, driving for Richard Childress Racing, finished in 3rd.

Connor Zilisch and Ty Gibbs led a combined 35 laps of the event. Both drivers were involved in a late-race incident on lap 48, Zilisch rebounded to finish 5th, while Gibbs fell back to finish 14th.

== Report ==
=== Background ===
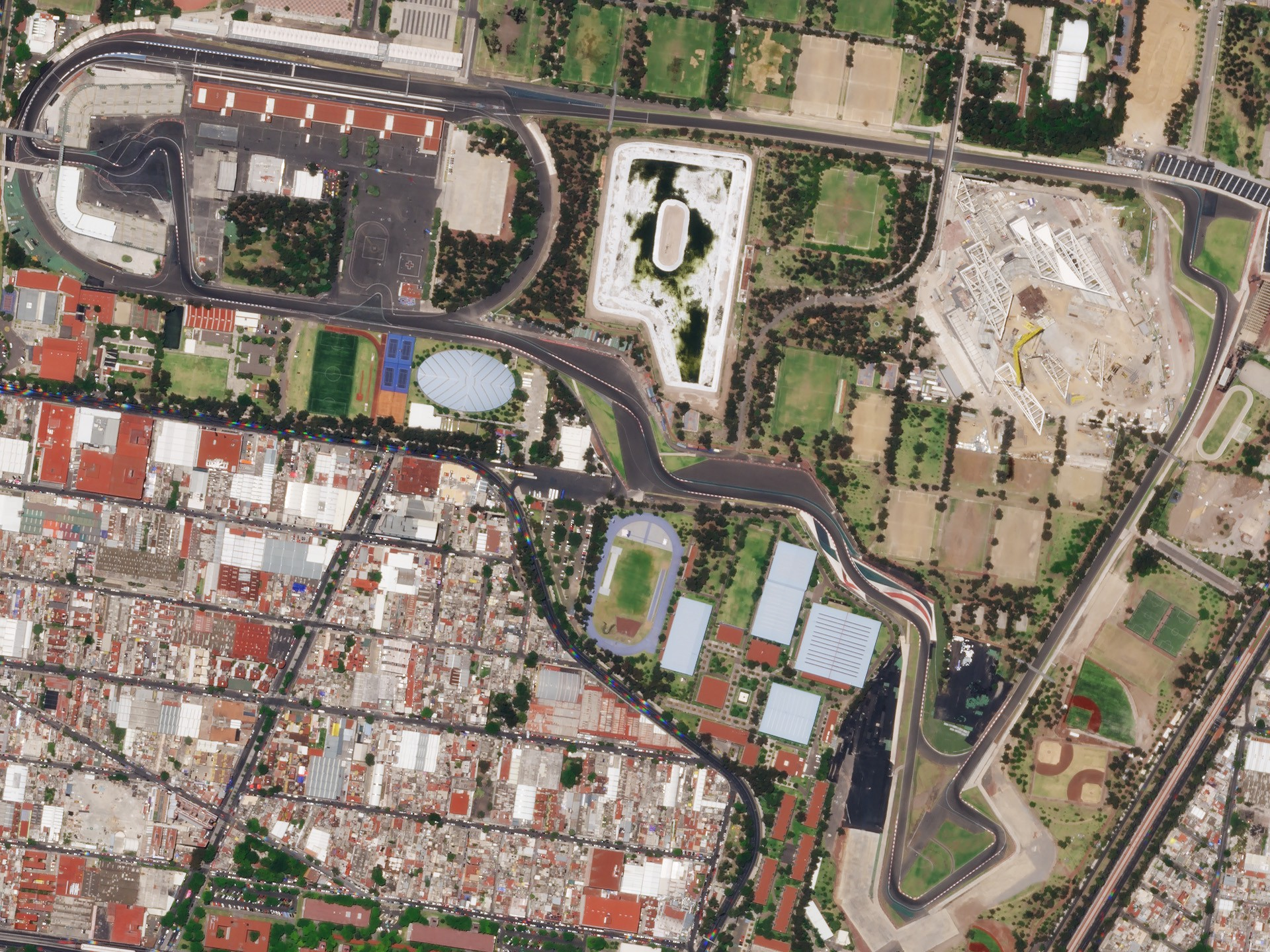
Autódromo Hermanos Rodríguez, the track where the race was held.

The race is held at Autódromo Hermanos Rodríguez, a road course in Mexico City. The track was built in 1959, and has held the NASCAR Xfinity Series from 2005 to 2008. The track sits 7,500 feet above sea level, making it the highest altitude track on the NASCAR calendar. On August 27, 2024, it was announced that the track would host both the NASCAR Cup Series and the Xfinity Series, marking the first time the Cup Series went outside the United States since 1958.

On May 27, 2025, NASCAR added two extra spots out of forty for the race based on qualifying results.

==== Entry list ====
- (R) denotes rookie driver.
- (i) denotes driver who is ineligible for series driver points.

#	Driver	Team	Make
00	Sheldon Creed	Haas Factory Team	Ford
1	Carson Kvapil (R)	JR Motorsports	Chevrolet
2	Jesse Love	Richard Childress Racing	Chevrolet
4	Parker Retzlaff	Alpha Prime Racing	Chevrolet
5	Kris Wright	Our Motorsports	Chevrolet
07	Alex Labbé	SS-Green Light Racing	Chevrolet
7	Justin Allgaier	JR Motorsports	Chevrolet
8	Sammy Smith	JR Motorsports	Chevrolet
9	Daniel Suárez (i)	JR Motorsports	Chevrolet
10	Daniel Dye (R)	Kaulig Racing	Chevrolet
11	Josh Williams	Kaulig Racing	Chevrolet
14	Josh Bilicki	SS-Green Light Racing	Chevrolet
16	Christian Eckes (R)	Kaulig Racing	Chevrolet
18	William Sawalich (R)	Joe Gibbs Racing	Toyota
19	Ty Gibbs (i)	Joe Gibbs Racing	Toyota
20	Brandon Jones	Joe Gibbs Racing	Toyota
21	Austin Hill	Richard Childress Racing	Chevrolet
24	Christopher Bell (i)	Sam Hunt Racing	Toyota
25	Harrison Burton	AM Racing	Ford
26	Dean Thompson (R)	Sam Hunt Racing	Toyota
27	Jeb Burton	Jordan Anderson Racing	Chevrolet
28	Kyle Sieg	RSS Racing	Ford
31	Blaine Perkins	Jordan Anderson Racing	Chevrolet
32	Austin Green	Jordan Anderson Racing	Chevrolet
35	Rubén Rovelo	Joey Gase Motorsports	Chevrolet
39	Ryan Sieg	RSS Racing	Ford
41	Sam Mayer	Haas Factory Team	Ford
42	Anthony Alfredo	Young's Motorsports	Chevrolet
44	Brennan Poole	Alpha Prime Racing	Chevrolet
45	Brad Perez	Alpha Prime Racing	Chevrolet
48	Nick Sanchez (R)	Big Machine Racing	Chevrolet
51	Jeremy Clements	Jeremy Clements Racing	Chevrolet
53	Sage Karam	Joey Gase Motorsports	Toyota
54	Taylor Gray (R)	Joe Gibbs Racing	Toyota
70	Thomas Annunziata	Cope Family Racing	Chevrolet
71	Ryan Ellis	DGM Racing	Chevrolet
88	Connor Zilisch (R)	JR Motorsports	Chevrolet
91	Andrés Pérez de Lara (i)	DGM Racing	Chevrolet
99	Matt DiBenedetto	Viking Motorsports	Chevrolet
Official entry list

== Practice ==
Two practice sessions were originally scheduled to be held on Friday, June 13, but was postponed due to traveling issues with numerous drivers. The session was moved to Saturday, June 14, at 11:05 AM EST, and would last for 50 minutes. Ty Gibbs, driving for Joe Gibbs Racing, would set the fastest time in the session, with a lap of 1:32.979, and a speed of 93.699 mph (150.794 km/h).

Pos.	#	Driver	Team	Make	Time	Speed
1	19	Ty Gibbs (i)	Joe Gibbs Racing	Toyota	1:32.979	93.699
2	88	Connor Zilisch (R)	JR Motorsports	Chevrolet	1:33.058	93.619
3	24	Christopher Bell (i)	Sam Hunt Racing	Toyota	1:33.546	93.131
Full practice results

== Qualifying ==
Qualifying was held on Saturday, June 14, at 9:30 AM EST. Since the Autódromo Hermanos Rodríguez is a road course, the qualifying procedure used is a two group, one round system. Drivers will be separated into two groups, A and B. Both groups will be 20 minutes long, and each driver will have multiple laps to set a time. Whoever sets the fastest time between both groups will win the pole.

Connor Zilisch, driving for JR Motorsports, would score the pole for the race, with a lap of 1:32.372, and a speed of 94.314 mph (151.784 km/h).

No drivers would fail to qualify as the international provisional was used for the 39th position.

=== Qualifying results ===
Pos.	#	Driver	Team	Make	Time	Speed
1	88	Connor Zilisch (R)	JR Motorsports	Chevrolet	1:32.372	94.314
2	19	Ty Gibbs (i)	Joe Gibbs Racing	Toyota	1:32.475	94.209
3	24	Christopher Bell (i)	Sam Hunt Racing	Toyota	1:32.953	93.725
4	1	Carson Kvapil (R)	JR Motorsports	Chevrolet	1:33.105	93.572
5	8	Sammy Smith	JR Motorsports	Chevrolet	1:33.223	93.453
6	41	Sam Mayer	Haas Factory Team	Ford	1:33.224	93.452
7	21	Austin Hill	Richard Childress Racing	Chevrolet	1:33.245	93.431
8	54	Taylor Gray (R)	Joe Gibbs Racing	Toyota	1:33.266	93.410
9	48	Nick Sanchez (R)	Big Machine Racing	Chevrolet	1:33.331	93.345
10	2	Jesse Love	Richard Childress Racing	Chevrolet	1:33.343	93.333
11	18	William Sawalich (R)	Joe Gibbs Racing	Toyota	1:33.362	93.314
12	7	Justin Allgaier	JR Motorsports	Chevrolet	1:33.406	93.270
13	00	Sheldon Creed	Haas Factory Team	Ford	1:33.425	93.251
14	32	Austin Green	Jordan Anderson Racing	Chevrolet	1:33.799	92.879
15	20	Brandon Jones	Joe Gibbs Racing	Toyota	1:33.893	92.786
16	91	Andrés Pérez de Lara (i)	DGM Racing	Chevrolet	1:33.949	92.731
17	99	Matt DiBenedetto	Viking Motorsports	Chevrolet	1:34.065	92.617
18	27	Jeb Burton	Jordan Anderson Racing	Chevrolet	1:34.120	92.563
19	51	Jeremy Clements	Jeremy Clements Racing	Chevrolet	1:34.136	92.547
20	53	Sage Karam	Joey Gase Motorsports	Toyota	1:34.156	92.527
21	07	Alex Labbé	SS-Green Light Racing	Chevrolet	1:34.176	92.508
22	25	Harrison Burton	AM Racing	Ford	1:34.342	92.345
23	70	Thomas Annunziata	Cope Family Racing	Chevrolet	1:34.409	92.279
24	31	Blaine Perkins	Jordan Anderson Racing	Chevrolet	1:34.433	92.256
25	71	Ryan Ellis	DGM Racing	Chevrolet	1:34.503	92.188
26	26	Dean Thompson (R)	Sam Hunt Racing	Toyota	1:34.527	92.164
27	5	Kris Wright	Our Motorsports	Chevrolet	1:34.535	92.156
28	14	Josh Bilicki	SS-Green Light Racing	Chevrolet	1:34.570	92.122
29	10	Daniel Dye (R)	Kaulig Racing	Chevrolet	1:34.571	92.121
30	39	Ryan Sieg	RSS Racing	Ford	1:34.680	92.015
31	35	Rubén Rovelo	Joey Gase Motorsports	Chevrolet	1:34.731	91.966
32	11	Josh Williams	Kaulig Racing	Chevrolet	1:34.784	91.914
Qualified by owner's points
33	44	Brennan Poole	Alpha Prime Racing	Chevrolet	1:35.048	91.659
34	16	Christian Eckes (R)	Kaulig Racing	Chevrolet	1:35.058	91.649
35	4	Parker Retzlaff	Alpha Prime Racing	Chevrolet	1:35.076	91.632
36	28	Kyle Sieg	RSS Racing	Ford	1:35.218	91.495
37	45	Brad Perez	Alpha Prime Racing	Chevrolet	1:35.364	91.355
38	42	Anthony Alfredo	Young's Motorsports	Chevrolet	–	–
Qualified by international provisional
39	9	Daniel Suárez (i)	JR Motorsports	Chevrolet	9:50.828	14.745
Official qualifying results
Official starting lineup

== Race results ==
Stage 1 Laps: 20

Pos.	#	Driver	Team	Make	Pts
1	1	Carson Kvapil (R)	JR Motorsports	Chevrolet	10
2	54	Taylor Gray (R)	Joe Gibbs Racing	Toyota	9
3	2	Jesse Love	Richard Childress Racing	Chevrolet	8
4	21	Austin Hill	Richard Childress Racing	Chevrolet	7
5	48	Nick Sanchez (R)	Big Machine Racing	Chevrolet	6
6	20	Brandon Jones	Joe Gibbs Racing	Toyota	5
7	53	Sage Karam	Joey Gase Motorsports	Toyota	4
8	99	Matt DiBenedetto	Viking Motorsports	Chevrolet	3
9	27	Jeb Burton	Jordan Anderson Racing	Chevrolet	2
10	07	Alex Labbé	SS-Green Light Racing	Chevrolet	1

Stage 2 Laps: 20

Pos.	#	Driver	Team	Make	Pts
1	8	Sammy Smith	JR Motorsports	Chevrolet	10
2	54	Taylor Gray (R)	Joe Gibbs Racing	Toyota	9
3	00	Sheldon Creed	Haas Factory Team	Ford	8
4	20	Brandon Jones	Joe Gibbs Racing	Toyota	7
5	16	Christian Eckes (R)	Kaulig Racing	Chevrolet	6
6	10	Daniel Dye (R)	Kaulig Racing	Chevrolet	5
7	26	Dean Thompson (R)	Sam Hunt Racing	Toyota	4
8	48	Nick Sanchez (R)	Big Machine Racing	Chevrolet	3
9	88	Connor Zilisch (R)	JR Motorsports	Chevrolet	2
10	19	Ty Gibbs (i)	Joe Gibbs Racing	Toyota	0

Stage 3 Laps: 25

Fin	St	#	Driver	Team	Make	Laps	Led	Status	Pts
1	39	9	Daniel Suárez (i)	JR Motorsports	Chevrolet	65	19	Running	0
2	8	54	Taylor Gray (R)	Joe Gibbs Racing	Toyota	65	1	Running	58
3	7	21	Austin Hill	Richard Childress Racing	Chevrolet	65	0	Running	42
4	34	16	Christian Eckes (R)	Kaulig Racing	Chevrolet	65	0	Running	40
5	1	88	Connor Zilisch (R)	JR Motorsports	Chevrolet	65	17	Running	35
6	11	18	William Sawalich (R)	Joe Gibbs Racing	Toyota	65	0	Running	32
7	14	32	Austin Green	Jordan Anderson Racing	Chevrolet	65	0	Running	31
8	18	27	Jeb Burton	Jordan Anderson Racing	Chevrolet	65	0	Running	32
9	22	25	Harrison Burton	AM Racing	Ford	65	0	Running	29
10	5	8	Sammy Smith	JR Motorsports	Chevrolet	65	5	Running	38
11	13	00	Sheldon Creed	Haas Factory Team	Ford	65	0	Running	35
12	26	26	Dean Thompson (R)	Sam Hunt Racing	Toyota	65	0	Running	30
13	29	10	Daniel Dye (R)	Kaulig Racing	Chevrolet	65	0	Running	30
14	2	19	Ty Gibbs (i)	Joe Gibbs Racing	Toyota	65	18	Running	0
15	21	07	Alex Labbé	SS-Green Light Racing	Chevrolet	65	0	Running	24
16	17	99	Matt DiBenedetto	Viking Motorsports	Chevrolet	65	0	Running	25
17	27	5	Kris Wright	Our Motorsports	Chevrolet	65	0	Running	21
18	10	2	Jesse Love	Richard Childress Racing	Chevrolet	65	0	Running	28
19	4	1	Carson Kvapil (R)	JR Motorsports	Chevrolet	65	5	Running	29
20	32	11	Josh Williams	Kaulig Racing	Chevrolet	65	0	Running	18
21	38	42	Anthony Alfredo	Young's Motorsports	Chevrolet	65	0	Running	17
22	23	70	Thomas Annunziata	Cope Family Racing	Chevrolet	65	0	Running	16
23	6	41	Sam Mayer	Haas Factory Team	Ford	65	0	Running	15
24	28	14	Josh Bilicki	SS-Green Light Racing	Chevrolet	65	0	Running	12
25	15	20	Brandon Jones	Joe Gibbs Racing	Toyota	65	0	Running	25
26	37	45	Brad Perez	Alpha Prime Racing	Chevrolet	65	0	Running	12
27	24	31	Blaine Perkins	Jordan Anderson Racing	Chevrolet	65	0	Running	11
28	36	28	Kyle Sieg	RSS Racing	Ford	65	0	Running	10
29	30	39	Ryan Sieg	RSS Racing	Ford	65	0	Running	9
30	16	91	Andrés Pérez de Lara (i)	DGM Racing	Chevrolet	65	0	Running	0
31	9	48	Nick Sanchez (R)	Big Machine Racing	Chevrolet	64	0	Running	16
32	25	71	Ryan Ellis	DGM Racing	Chevrolet	61	0	Running	6
33	20	53	Sage Karam	Joey Gase Motorsports	Toyota	52	0	Accident	9
34	12	7	Justin Allgaier	JR Motorsports	Chevrolet	50	0	Running	4
35	35	4	Parker Retzlaff	Alpha Prime Racing	Chevrolet	46	0	Accident	3
36	19	51	Jeremy Clements	Jeremy Clements Racing	Chevrolet	43	0	Running	2
37	31	35	Rubén Rovelo	Joey Gase Motorsports	Chevrolet	43	0	Running	1
38	33	44	Brennan Poole	Alpha Prime Racing	Chevrolet	40	0	Suspension	1
39	3	24	Christopher Bell (i)	Sam Hunt Racing	Toyota	36	0	Engine	0
Official race results

== Standings after the race ==
Drivers' Championship standings

	Pos	Driver	Points
	1	Justin Allgaier	587
	2	Austin Hill	533 (–54)
	3	Sam Mayer	488 (–99)
	4	Jesse Love	460 (–127)
	5	Connor Zilisch	430 (–157)
	6	Sheldon Creed	416 (–171)
	7	Carson Kvapil	409 (–178)
	8	Brandon Jones	404 (–183)
	9	Jeb Burton	397 (–190)
3	10	Sammy Smith	378 (–209)
	11	Harrison Burton	377 (–210)
2	12	Ryan Sieg	374 (–213)
Official driver's standings

Manufacturers' Championship standings

Pos	Manufacturer	Points
1	Chevrolet	585
2	Toyota	500 (–85)
3	Ford	473 (–112)

- Note: Only the first 12 positions are included for the driver standings.

Previous race: 2025 Tennessee Lottery 250	NASCAR Xfinity Series; 2025 season	Next race: 2025 Explore the Pocono Mountains 250
