= Nick Leitz =

American racing driver (born 1996)

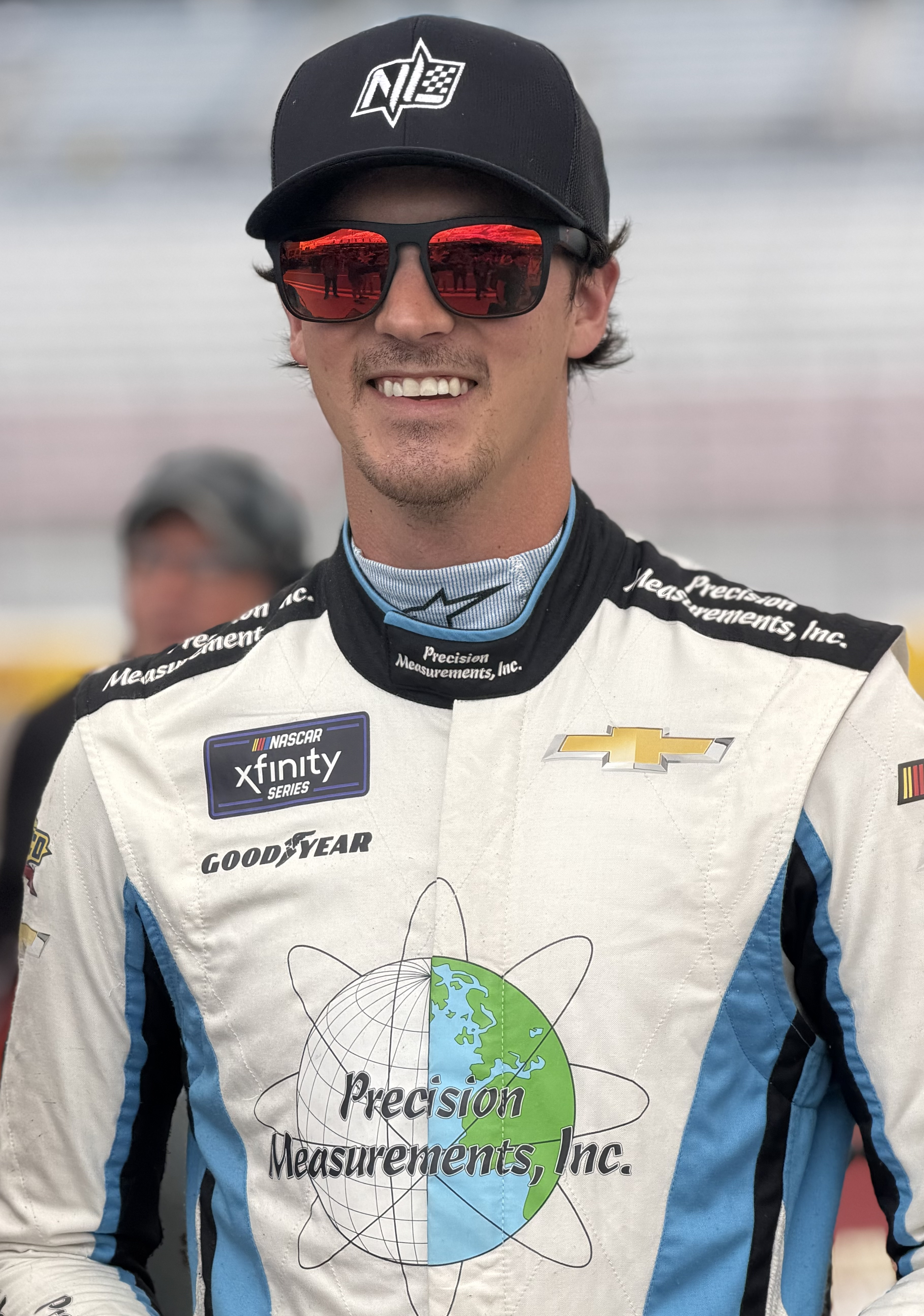
- Leitz at Las Vegas Motor Speedway in 2025
- Born: Nicholas Alexander Leitz; October 15, 1996 (age 30); Chesapeake, Virginia, U.S.

NASCAR O'Reilly Auto Parts Series career
- 23 races run over 4 years
- 2026 position: 81st
- Best finish: 37th (2025)
- First race: 2023 Kansas Lottery 300 (Kansas)
- Last race: 2026 TPG 250 (Talladega)
Wins	Top tens	Poles
0	0	0

NASCAR FedEx Freight Truck Series career
- 13 races run over 4 years
- 2026 position: 33rd
- Best finish: 33rd (2026)
- First race: 2022 Rackley Roofing 200 (Nashville)
- Last race: 2026 RaceToStopSuicide.com 200 (Kansas)
Wins	Top tens	Poles
0	1	0
- Statistics up to date as of November 7, 2026.

Nicholas Alexander Leitz (born October 15, 1996) is an American professional stock car racing driver. He last competed part-time in the NASCAR Craftsman Truck Series, driving the No. 1/5 Toyota Tundra TRD Pro for Tricon Garage, and part-time in the NASCAR O'Reilly Auto Parts Series, driving the No. 42 Chevrolet Camaro SS for Young's Motorsports. He has also previously competed in the CARS Tour.

== Racing career ==
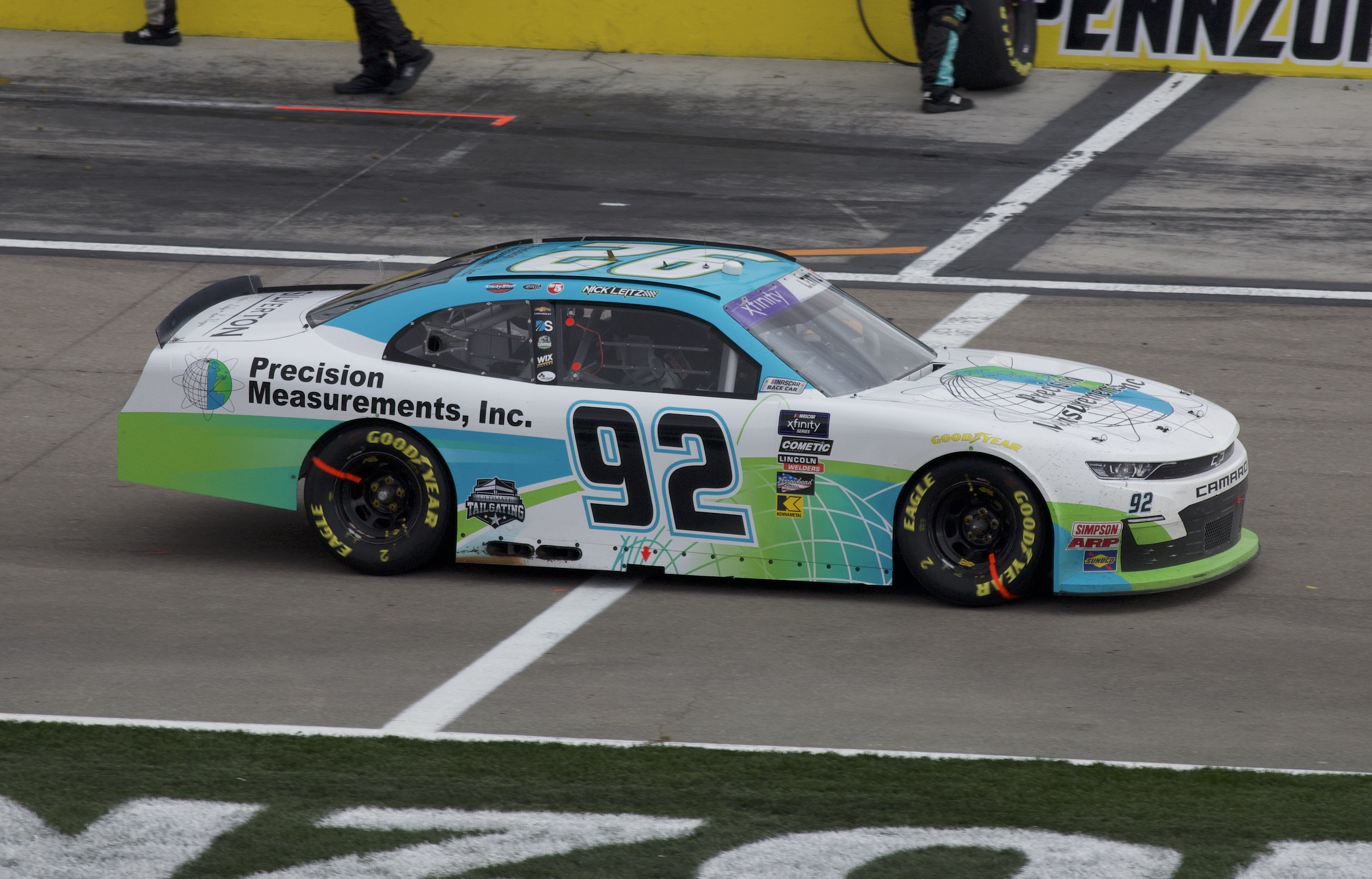
Leitz's No. 92 car at Las Vegas Motor Speedway in March 2024.

Leitz made his Truck Series debut in the 2022 race at Nashville, driving the No. 43 truck for Reaume Brothers Racing. He ran two more races later in the year in the team's No. 33 truck (Richmond and Homestead-Miami). On May 1, 2023, it was announced that Leitz would run three races (Kansas in May, Nashville and Homestead-Miami) for Young's Motorsports in their No. 20 truck. After it was announced that Greg Van Alst would drive the No. 20 truck for the rest of the 2023 season starting at IRP, it was assumed that Leitz would drive the team's No. 02 truck instead at Homestead, as the truck had a rotation of drivers and no driver had been announced for that race. However, Brad Perez would end up driving the No. 02 truck at Homestead, and Leitz would stay in the No. 20 with Van Alst not running that race. Leitz also made his Xfinity Series debut that year in the race at Kansas, driving the No. 38 car for RSS Racing in place of Joe Graf Jr. who was driving the Joe Gibbs Racing No. 19 car in that race instead.

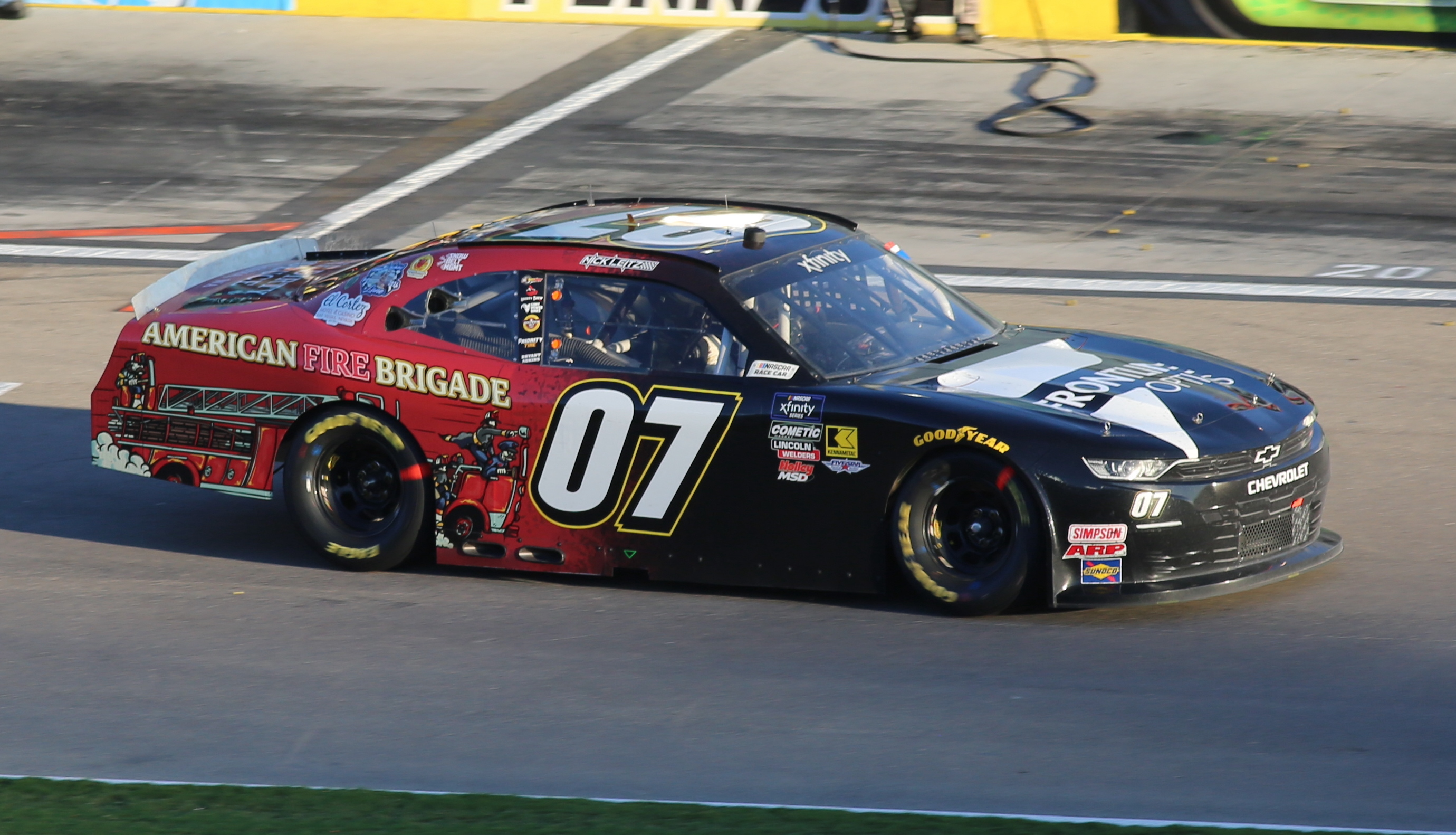
Leitz's No. 07 car at Las Vegas Motor Speedway in October 2025.

In 2024, Leitz made six starts in the Xfinity Series driving for DGM Racing, all in their No. 92 car.

In 2025, Leitz returned to the Xfinity Series part-time, joining SS-Green Light Racing to drive their No. 07 car, sharing it with Patrick Emerling and Alex Labbé. In the season finale at Phoenix Raceway, RSS brought him back to drive their No. 28 car in place of Kyle Sieg, who moved to his brother Ryan Sieg's No. 39 car for this race after Ryan got an opportunity to drive the Haas Factory Team No. 41 car in place of the suspended Sam Mayer after Mayer intentionally crashed Jeb Burton after the checkered flag in the previous race at Martinsville.

On February 9, 2026, it was announced that Leitz will drive the No. 5 Toyota for Tricon Garage at the season opening race for the Truck Series at Daytona International Speedway. Tricon announced on July 13 that Leitz will be taking over their No. 1 Truck for North Wilkesboro, Richmond, Bristol and Kansas.

== Motorsports career results ==
=== Racing career summary ===
Season	Series	Team	Races	Wins	Top 5	Top 10	Points	Position
2015	CARS Super Late Model Tour	Jay Hedgecock	1	0	0	0	10	62nd
2022	NASCAR Camping World Truck Series	Reaume Brothers Racing	3	0	0	0	21	54th
2023	NASCAR Craftsman Truck Series	Young's Motorsports	4	0	0	0	41	41st
2023	NASCAR Xfinity Series	RSS Racing	1	0	0	0	0	NC†
2024	NASCAR Xfinity Series	DGM Racing	6	0	0	0	60	46th
2025	NASCAR Craftsman Truck Series	Young's Motorsports	1	0	0	0	0	NC†
2025	NASCAR Xfinity Series	SS-Green Light Racing	12	0	0	0	132	37th
2025	NASCAR Xfinity Series	RSS Racing	1	0	0	0	132	37th
2026	NASCAR Craftsman Truck Series	Tricon Garage	5	0	0	1	118	33rd
2026	NASCAR O'Reilly Auto Parts Series	Young's Motorsports	2	0	0	0	0	NC†

^{†} As Leitz was a guest driver, he was ineligible for championship points.

=== NASCAR ===
(key) (Bold – Pole position awarded by qualifying time. Italics – Pole position earned by points standings or practice time. * – Most laps led.)

==== O'Reilly Auto Parts Series ====
NASCAR O'Reilly Auto Parts Series results
Year	Team	No.	Make	1	2	3	4	5	6	7	8	9	10	11	12	13	14	15	16	17	18	19	20	21	22	23	24	25	26	27	28	29	30	31	32	33	NOAPSC	Pts	Ref
2023	RSS Racing	38	Ford	DAY	CAL	LVS	PHO	ATL	COA	RCH	MAR	TAL	DOV	DAR	CLT	PIR	SON	NSH	CSC	ATL	NHA	POC	ROA	MCH	IRC	GLN	DAY	DAR	KAN; 31	BRI	TEX	ROV	LVS	HOM	MAR	PHO	102nd	0^{1}	
2024	DGM Racing	92	Chevy	DAY	ATL; 26	LVS; 27	PHO; 17	COA	RCH	MAR	TEX	TAL	DOV	DAR	CLT	PIR	SON	IOW	NHA	NSH	CSC	POC	IND	MCH	DAY	DAR	ATL; 20	GLN	BRI	KAN	TAL; 37	ROV	LVS	HOM; 37	MAR	PHO	46th	60	
2025	SS-Green Light Racing	07	Chevy	DAY	ATL; 22	COA	PHO; 30	LVS	HOM	MAR	DAR; 27	BRI	CAR	TAL	TEX; 29	CLT; 27	NSH; 27	MXC	POC	ATL; 24	CSC	SON	DOV; 33	IND	IOW	GLN	DAY	PIR	GTW; 29	BRI	KAN; 38	ROV	LVS; 34	TAL; 11	MAR		37th	132	
2025	RSS Racing	28	Ford																																	PHO; 20	37th	132	
2026	Young's Motorsports	42	Chevy	DAY	ATL; 18	COA	PHO	LVS	DAR	MAR	CAR	BRI	KAN	TAL	TEX	GLN	DOV	CLT	NSH	POC	COR	SON	CHI	ATL; 29	IND	IOW	DAY	DAR	GTW	BRI	LVS	CLT	PHO	TAL; 15	MAR	HOM	81st	0^{1}	

==== Craftsman Truck Series ====
NASCAR Craftsman Truck Series results
Year	Team	No.	Make	1	2	3	4	5	6	7	8	9	10	11	12	13	14	15	16	17	18	19	20	21	22	23	24	25	NCTS	Pts	Ref
2022	Reaume Brothers Racing	43	Chevy	DAY	LVS	ATL	COA	MAR	BRD	DAR	KAN	TEX	CLT	GTW	SON	KNX	NSH; 26	MOH	POC	IRP									54th	21	
2022	Reaume Brothers Racing	33	Chevy																		RCH; 36	KAN	BRI	TAL	HOM; 28	PHO			54th	21	
2023	Young's Motorsports	20	Chevy	DAY	LVS	ATL	COA	TEX	BRD	MAR	KAN; 21	DAR	NWS	CLT	GTW	NSH; 19	MOH	POC	RCH	IRP	MLW	KAN	BRI	TAL	HOM; 23	PHO; 19			41st	41	
2025	Young's Motorsports	02	Chevy	DAY	ATL	LVS	HOM	MAR	BRI	CAR	TEX	KAN	NWS	CLT	NSH	MCH	POC	LRP	IRP	GLN	RCH; 27	DAR	BRI	NHA	ROV	TAL	MAR	PHO	103rd	0^{1}	
2026	Tricon Garage	5	Toyota	DAY; 11	ATL	STP	DAR	ROC	BRI	TEX	GLN	DOV	CLT	NSS	MCH	COR	LRP												33rd	118	
2026	Tricon Garage	1	Toyota															NWS; 17	IRP	RCH; 12	NHA	BRI; 34	KAN; 7	CLT	PHO	TAL	MAR	HOM	33rd	118	

^{*} Season still in progress
^{1} Ineligible for series points

=== CARS Super Late Model Tour ===
(key)

CARS Super Late Model Tour results
Year	Team	No.	Make	1	2	3	4	5	6	7	8	9	10	11	12	13	CSLMTC	Pts	Ref
2015	Jay Hedgecock	41L	Ford	SNM; 23	ROU	HCY	SNM	TCM	MMS	ROU	CON	MYB	HCY				62nd	10	
2017	N/A	41L	N/A	CON	DOM	DOM	HCY	HCY	BRI; DNQ	AND	ROU	TCM	ROU	HCY	CON	SBO	N/A	0	
