= 2025 Andy's Frozen Custard 300 =

12th race of the 2025 NASCAR Xfinity Series

Race details
- Race 12 of 33 of the 2025 NASCAR Xfinity Series
- Date: May 3, 2025
- Official name: 21st Annual Andy's Frozen Custard 300
- Location: Texas Motor Speedway in Fort Worth, Texas
- Course: Permanent racing facility
- Course length: 1.5 miles (2.4 km)
- Distance: 208 laps, 312 mi (502 km)
- Scheduled distance: 200 laps, 300 mi (480 km)
- Average speed: 106.424 mph (171.273 km/h)

Pole position
Driver	Austin Hill	Richard Childress Racing
- Grid positions set by competition-based formula

Most laps led
Driver	Justin Allgaier	JR Motorsports
- Laps: 99

Winner
No. 88	Kyle Larson	JR Motorsports

Television in the United States
- Network: The CW
- Announcers: Adam Alexander and Parker Kligerman

Radio in the United States
- Radio: PRN

The 2025 Andy's Frozen Custard 300 was the 12th stock car race of the 2025 NASCAR Xfinity Series, and the 21st iteration of the event. The race was held on Saturday, May 3, 2025, at Texas Motor Speedway in Fort Worth, Texas, a 1.5 miles (2.4 km) permanent asphalt quad-oval shaped intermediate speedway. The race was originally scheduled to be contested over 200 laps, but was increased to 208 due to a double overtime.

In a caution-filled race, Kyle Larson, driving for JR Motorsports as a substitute driver for Connor Zilisch, earned his 17th career NASCAR Xfinity Series win, and his second of the season. Larson's teammate Justin Allgaier dominated the majority of the race, winning the first stage and leading a race-high 99 laps, before being involved in a late-race incident with Kris Wright, ending his chances and finishing 35th. To fill out the podium, Taylor Gray and Riley Herbst, both driving for Joe Gibbs Racing, would finish 2nd and 3rd, respectively.

== Report ==
=== Background ===
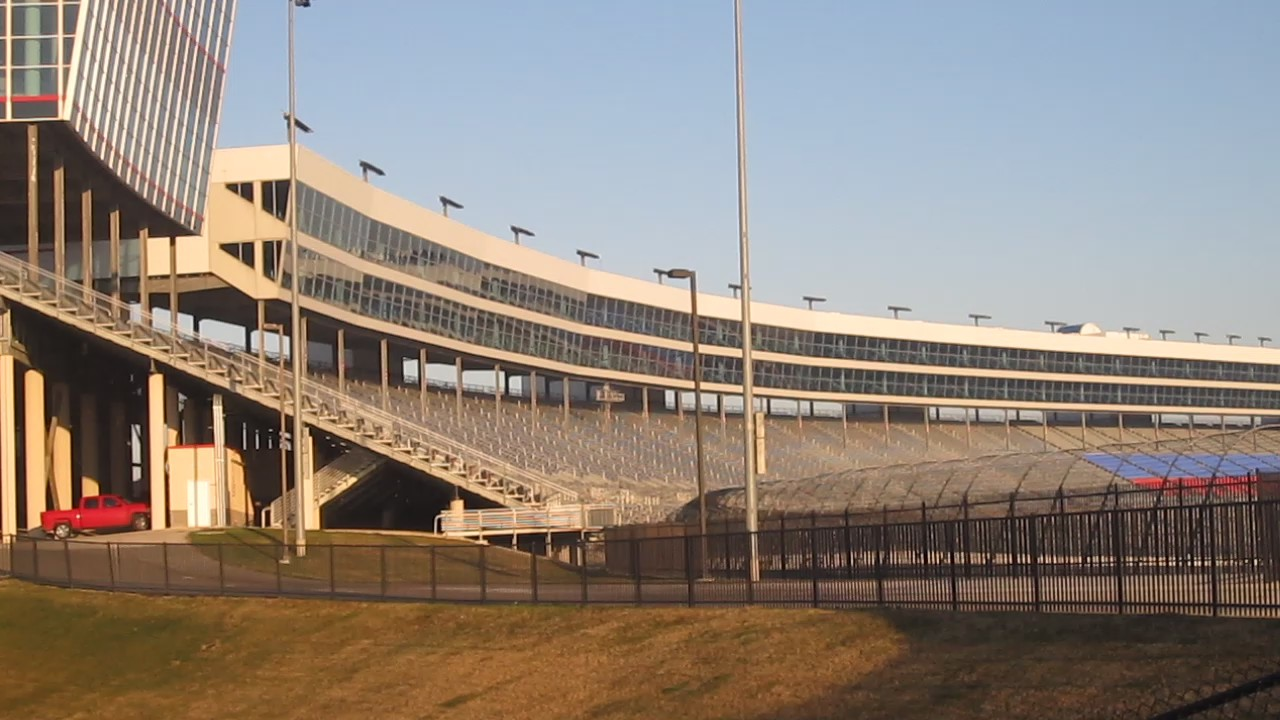
Texas Motor Speedway, the track where the race was held.

Texas Motor Speedway is a speedway located in the northernmost portion of the U.S. city of Fort Worth, Texas – the portion located in Denton County, Texas. The track measures 1.5 miles (2.4 km) around and is banked 24 degrees in the turns, and is of the oval design, where the front straightaway juts outward slightly. The track layout is similar to Atlanta Motor Speedway and Charlotte Motor Speedway (formerly Lowe's Motor Speedway). The track is owned by Speedway Motorsports, Inc., the same company that owns Atlanta and Charlotte Motor Speedway, as well as the short-track Bristol Motor Speedway.

==== Entry list ====
- (R) denotes rookie driver.
- (i) denotes driver who is ineligible for series driver points.

#	Driver	Team	Make
00	Sheldon Creed	Haas Factory Team	Ford
1	Carson Kvapil (R)	JR Motorsports	Chevrolet
2	Jesse Love	Richard Childress Racing	Chevrolet
4	Parker Retzlaff	Alpha Prime Racing	Chevrolet
5	Kris Wright	Our Motorsports	Chevrolet
07	Nick Leitz	SS-Green Light Racing	Chevrolet
7	Justin Allgaier	JR Motorsports	Chevrolet
8	Sammy Smith	JR Motorsports	Chevrolet
10	Daniel Dye (R)	Kaulig Racing	Chevrolet
11	Josh Williams	Kaulig Racing	Chevrolet
14	Garrett Smithley	SS-Green Light Racing	Chevrolet
16	Christian Eckes (R)	Kaulig Racing	Chevrolet
17	Corey Day	Hendrick Motorsports	Chevrolet
18	William Sawalich (R)	Joe Gibbs Racing	Toyota
19	Riley Herbst (i)	Joe Gibbs Racing	Toyota
20	Brandon Jones	Joe Gibbs Racing	Toyota
21	Austin Hill	Richard Childress Racing	Chevrolet
25	Harrison Burton	AM Racing	Ford
26	Dean Thompson (R)	Sam Hunt Racing	Toyota
27	Jeb Burton	Jordan Anderson Racing	Chevrolet
28	Kyle Sieg	RSS Racing	Ford
31	Blaine Perkins	Jordan Anderson Racing	Chevrolet
32	Katherine Legge (i)	Jordan Anderson Racing	Chevrolet
35	Joey Gase	Joey Gase Motorsports	Chevrolet
39	Ryan Sieg	RSS Racing	Ford
41	Sam Mayer	Haas Factory Team	Ford
42	Anthony Alfredo	Young's Motorsports	Chevrolet
44	Brennan Poole	Alpha Prime Racing	Chevrolet
45	Mason Massey	Alpha Prime Racing	Chevrolet
48	Nick Sanchez (R)	Big Machine Racing	Chevrolet
51	Jeremy Clements	Jeremy Clements Racing	Chevrolet
53	Mason Maggio	Joey Gase Motorsports	Ford
54	Taylor Gray (R)	Joe Gibbs Racing	Toyota
70	Leland Honeyman	Cope Family Racing	Chevrolet
71	Ryan Ellis	DGM Racing	Chevrolet
74	Dawson Cram	Mike Harmon Racing	Chevrolet
88	Kyle Larson (i) (Note: On April 30, it was announced that Connor Zilisch would skip this race due to lower back pain sustained from Talladega.)	JR Motorsports	Chevrolet
91	Josh Bilicki	DGM Racing	Chevrolet
92	C. J. McLaughlin	DGM Racing	Chevrolet
99	Matt DiBenedetto	Viking Motorsports	Chevrolet
Official entry list

== Starting lineup ==
Practice and qualifying were originally scheduled to be held on Friday, May 2, at 4:05 PM and 5:10 PM CST, but were both cancelled due to constant rain showers. The starting lineup would be determined by the metric system. As a result, Austin Hill, driving for Richard Childress Racing, will start on the pole.

Two drivers would fail to qualify: Dawson Cram and C. J. McLaughlin.

=== Starting lineup ===
Pos.	#	Driver	Team	Make
1	21	Austin Hill	Richard Childress Racing	Chevrolet
2	7	Justin Allgaier	JR Motorsports	Chevrolet
3	2	Jesse Love	Richard Childress Racing	Chevrolet
4	27	Jeb Burton	Jordan Anderson Racing	Chevrolet
5	25	Harrison Burton	AM Racing	Ford
6	00	Sheldon Creed	Haas Factory Team	Ford
7	41	Sam Mayer	Haas Factory Team	Ford
8	99	Matt DiBenedetto	Viking Motorsports	Chevrolet
9	10	Daniel Dye (R)	Kaulig Racing	Chevrolet
10	42	Anthony Alfredo	Young's Motorsports	Chevrolet
11	31	Blaine Perkins	Jordan Anderson Racing	Chevrolet
12	54	Taylor Gray (R)	Joe Gibbs Racing	Toyota
13	1	Carson Kvapil (R)	JR Motorsports	Chevrolet
14	48	Nick Sanchez (R)	Big Machine Racing	Chevrolet
15	07	Nick Leitz	SS-Green Light Racing	Chevrolet
16	26	Dean Thompson (R)	Sam Hunt Racing	Toyota
17	70	Leland Honeyman	Cope Family Racing	Chevrolet
18	44	Brennan Poole	Alpha Prime Racing	Chevrolet
19	71	Ryan Ellis	DGM Racing	Chevrolet
20	88	Kyle Larson (i)	JR Motorsports	Chevrolet
21	20	Brandon Jones	Joe Gibbs Racing	Toyota
22	8	Sammy Smith	JR Motorsports	Chevrolet
23	16	Christian Eckes (R)	Kaulig Racing	Chevrolet
24	91	Josh Bilicki	DGM Racing	Chevrolet
25	51	Jeremy Clements	Jeremy Clements Racing	Chevrolet
26	28	Kyle Sieg	RSS Racing	Ford
27	19	Riley Herbst (i)	Joe Gibbs Racing	Toyota
28	53	Mason Maggio	Joey Gase Motorsports	Ford
29	11	Josh Williams	Kaulig Racing	Chevrolet
30	5	Kris Wright	Our Motorsports	Chevrolet
31	39	Ryan Sieg	RSS Racing	Ford
32	45	Mason Massey	Alpha Prime Racing	Chevrolet
Qualified by owner's points
33	17	Corey Day	Hendrick Motorsports	Chevrolet
34	4	Parker Retzlaff	Alpha Prime Racing	Chevrolet
35	18	William Sawalich (R)	Joe Gibbs Racing	Toyota
36	32	Katherine Legge (i)	Jordan Anderson Racing	Chevrolet
37	35	Joey Gase	Joey Gase Motorsports	Chevrolet
38	14	Garrett Smithley	SS-Green Light Racing	Chevrolet
Failed to qualify
39	74	Dawson Cram	Mike Harmon Racing	Chevrolet
40	92	C. J. McLaughlin	DGM Racing	Chevrolet
Official starting lineup

== Race results ==
Stage 1 Laps: 45

Pos.	#	Driver	Team	Make	Pts
1	7	Justin Allgaier	JR Motorsports	Chevrolet	10
2	88	Kyle Larson (i)	JR Motorsports	Chevrolet	0
3	48	Nick Sanchez (R)	Big Machine Racing	Chevrolet	8
4	21	Austin Hill	Richard Childress Racing	Chevrolet	7
5	41	Sam Mayer	Haas Factory Team	Ford	6
6	00	Sheldon Creed	Haas Factory Team	Ford	5
7	39	Ryan Sieg	RSS Racing	Ford	4
8	20	Brandon Jones	Joe Gibbs Racing	Toyota	3
9	27	Jeb Burton	Jordan Anderson Racing	Chevrolet	2
10	42	Anthony Alfredo	Young's Motorsports	Chevrolet	1

Stage 2 Laps: 45

Pos.	#	Driver	Team	Make	Pts
1	21	Austin Hill	Richard Childress Racing	Chevrolet	10
2	7	Justin Allgaier	JR Motorsports	Chevrolet	9
3	00	Sheldon Creed	Haas Factory Team	Ford	8
4	48	Nick Sanchez (R)	Big Machine Racing	Chevrolet	7
5	41	Sam Mayer	Haas Factory Team	Ford	6
6	19	Riley Herbst (i)	Joe Gibbs Racing	Toyota	0
7	2	Jesse Love	Richard Childress Racing	Chevrolet	4
8	17	Corey Day	Hendrick Motorsports	Chevrolet	3
9	20	Brandon Jones	Joe Gibbs Racing	Toyota	2
10	54	Taylor Gray (R)	Joe Gibbs Racing	Toyota	1

Stage 3 Laps: 118

Fin	St	#	Driver	Team	Make	Laps	Led	Status	Pts
1	20	88	Kyle Larson (i)	JR Motorsports	Chevrolet	208	32	Running	0
2	12	54	Taylor Gray (R)	Joe Gibbs Racing	Toyota	208	0	Running	36
3	27	19	Riley Herbst (i)	Joe Gibbs Racing	Toyota	208	0	Running	0
4	1	21	Austin Hill	Richard Childress Racing	Chevrolet	208	57	Running	50
5	7	41	Sam Mayer	Haas Factory Team	Ford	208	18	Running	44
6	5	25	Harrison Burton	AM Racing	Ford	208	0	Running	31
7	3	2	Jesse Love	Richard Childress Racing	Chevrolet	208	0	Running	34
8	31	39	Ryan Sieg	RSS Racing	Ford	208	0	Running	33
9	21	20	Brandon Jones	Joe Gibbs Racing	Toyota	208	0	Running	33
10	4	27	Jeb Burton	Jordan Anderson Racing	Chevrolet	208	0	Running	29
11	9	10	Daniel Dye (R)	Kaulig Racing	Chevrolet	208	1	Running	26
12	10	42	Anthony Alfredo	Young's Motorsports	Chevrolet	208	0	Running	26
13	35	18	William Sawalich (R)	Joe Gibbs Racing	Toyota	208	0	Running	24
14	34	4	Parker Retzlaff	Alpha Prime Racing	Chevrolet	208	0	Running	23
15	8	99	Matt DiBenedetto	Viking Motorsports	Chevrolet	208	0	Running	22
16	33	17	Corey Day	Hendrick Motorsports	Chevrolet	208	0	Running	24
17	18	44	Brennan Poole	Alpha Prime Racing	Chevrolet	208	0	Running	20
18	22	8	Sammy Smith	JR Motorsports	Chevrolet	208	0	Running	19
19	13	1	Carson Kvapil (R)	JR Motorsports	Chevrolet	208	0	Running	18
20	14	48	Nick Sanchez (R)	Big Machine Racing	Chevrolet	208	1	Running	32
21	32	45	Mason Massey	Alpha Prime Racing	Chevrolet	207	0	Running	16
22	26	28	Kyle Sieg	RSS Racing	Ford	207	0	Running	15
23	19	71	Ryan Ellis	DGM Racing	Chevrolet	207	0	Running	14
24	11	31	Blaine Perkins	Jordan Anderson Racing	Chevrolet	207	0	Running	13
25	37	35	Joey Gase	Joey Gase Motorsports	Chevrolet	207	0	Running	12
26	28	53	Mason Maggio	Joey Gase Motorsports	Ford	207	0	Running	11
27	16	26	Dean Thompson (R)	Sam Hunt Racing	Toyota	205	0	Running	10
28	24	91	Josh Bilicki	DGM Racing	Chevrolet	205	0	Running	9
29	15	07	Nick Leitz	SS-Green Light Racing	Chevrolet	204	0	Running	8
30	38	14	Garrett Smithley	SS-Green Light Racing	Chevrolet	201	0	Running	7
31	25	51	Jeremy Clements	Jeremy Clements Racing	Chevrolet	200	0	Accident	6
32	36	32	Katherine Legge (i)	Jordan Anderson Racing	Chevrolet	200	0	Running	0
33	30	5	Kris Wright	Our Motorsports	Chevrolet	199	0	Running	4
34	17	70	Leland Honeyman	Cope Family Racing	Chevrolet	165	0	Vibration	3
35	2	7	Justin Allgaier	JR Motorsports	Chevrolet	155	99	Accident	22
36	6	00	Sheldon Creed	Haas Factory Team	Ford	104	0	Accident	14
37	29	11	Josh Williams	Kaulig Racing	Chevrolet	97	0	Accident	1
38	23	16	Christian Eckes (R)	Kaulig Racing	Chevrolet	47	0	Engine	1
Official race results

== Standings after the race ==
Drivers' Championship standings

	Pos	Driver	Points
	1	Justin Allgaier	471
	2	Austin Hill	420 (–51)
	3	Sam Mayer	391 (–80)
	4	Jesse Love	374 (–87)
2	5	Brandon Jones	326 (–145)
1	6	Carson Kvapil	324 (–147)
2	7	Jeb Burton	320 (–151)
3	8	Ryan Sieg	317 (–154)
1	9	Sammy Smith	312 (–159)
2	10	Harrison Burton	307 (–164)
1	11	Sheldon Creed	304 (–167)
6	12	Connor Zilisch	299 (–172)
Official driver's standings

Manufacturers' Championship standings

Pos	Manufacturer	Points
1	Chevrolet	470
2	Toyota	397 (–73)
3	Ford	383 (–87)

- Note: Only the first 12 positions are included for the driver standings.

== Notes ==
Previous race: 2025 Ag-Pro 300	NASCAR Xfinity Series; 2025 season	Next race: 2025 BetMGM 300
