= 2024 Call811.com Every Dig. Every Time. 200 =

4th race of the 2024 NASCAR Xfinity Series

Race details
- Race 4 of 33 of the 2024 NASCAR Xfinity Series
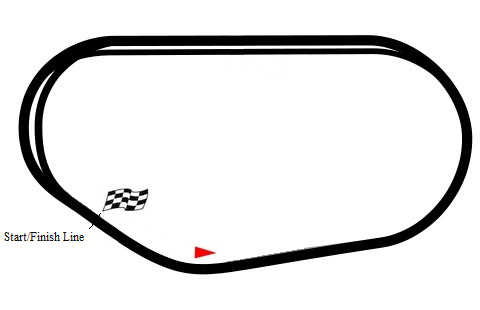
- Date: March 9, 2024
- Location: Phoenix Raceway in Avondale, Arizona
- Course: Permanent racing facility
- Course length: 1 miles (1.6 km)
- Distance: 205 laps, 205 mi (330 km)
- Scheduled distance: 200 laps, 200 mi (320 km)
- Average speed: 92.516 mph (148.890 km/h)

Pole position
Driver	Cole Custer	Stewart–Haas Racing
- Time: 27.380

Most laps led
Driver	Chandler Smith	Joe Gibbs Racing
- Laps: 88

Winner
No. 81	Chandler Smith	Joe Gibbs Racing

Television in the United States
- Network: FS1
- Announcers: Jamie Little, Joey Logano, and Daniel Suárez

Radio in the United States
- Radio: MRN

The 2024 Call811.com Every Dig. Every Time. 200 was the 4th stock car race of the 2024 NASCAR Xfinity Series, and the 20th iteration of the event. The race was held on Saturday, March 9, 2024, at Phoenix Raceway in Avondale, Arizona, a 1 mile (1.6 km) permanent asphalt tri-oval shaped speedway. The race was originally scheduled to be contested over 200 laps, but was increased to 205 laps, due to a NASCAR overtime finish. Chandler Smith, driving for Joe Gibbs Racing, would take the lead on the final restart with two laps to go, and held off the field to earn his second career NASCAR Xfinity Series win, and his first of the season. Smith was consistent throughout the entire race, leading a race-high 88 laps and winning the first stage. Justin Allgaier dominated the final portion of the race, leading 52 laps before blowing a tire and hitting the wall with five laps to go. To fill out the podium, Jesse Love, driving for Richard Childress Racing, and Sheldon Creed, driving for Joe Gibbs Racing, would finish 2nd and 3rd, respectively.

== Report ==
=== Background ===
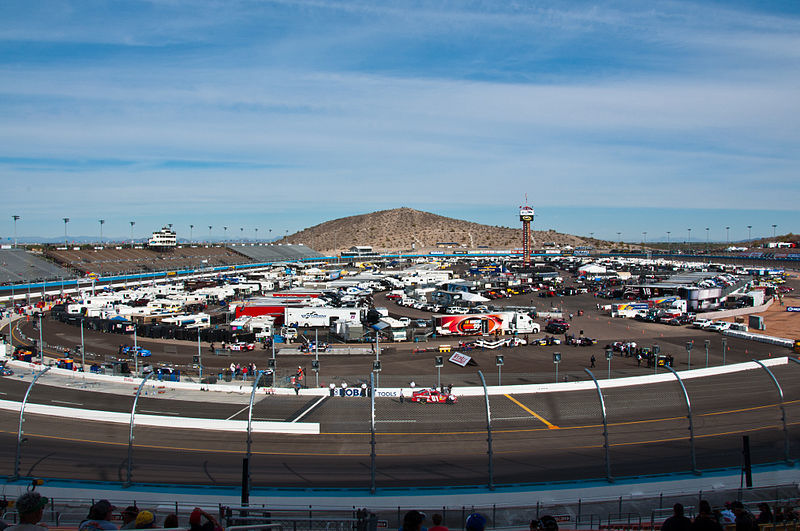
Phoenix Raceway, the circuit where the race will be held.

Phoenix Raceway is a 1-mile, low-banked tri-oval race track located in Avondale, Arizona, near Phoenix. The motorsport track opened in 1964 and currently hosts two NASCAR race weekends annually including the final championship race since 2020. Phoenix Raceway has also hosted the CART, IndyCar Series, USAC and the WeatherTech SportsCar Championship. The raceway is currently owned and operated by NASCAR.

==== Entry list ====
- (R) denotes rookie driver.
- (i) denotes driver who is ineligible for series driver points.

#	Driver	Team	Make
00	Cole Custer	Stewart–Haas Racing	Ford
1	Sam Mayer	JR Motorsports	Chevrolet
2	Jesse Love (R)	Richard Childress Racing	Chevrolet
4	Dawson Cram (R)	JD Motorsports	Chevrolet
5	Anthony Alfredo	Our Motorsports	Chevrolet
6	Garrett Smithley	JD Motorsports	Chevrolet
07	Patrick Emerling	SS-Green Light Racing	Chevrolet
7	Justin Allgaier	JR Motorsports	Chevrolet
8	Sammy Smith	JR Motorsports	Chevrolet
9	Brandon Jones	JR Motorsports	Chevrolet
11	Josh Williams	Kaulig Racing	Chevrolet
14	J. J. Yeley	SS-Green Light Racing	Chevrolet
15	Hailie Deegan (R)	AM Racing	Ford
16	A. J. Allmendinger	Kaulig Racing	Chevrolet
17	William Byron (i)	Hendrick Motorsports	Chevrolet
18	Sheldon Creed	Joe Gibbs Racing	Toyota
19	Aric Almirola	Joe Gibbs Racing	Toyota
20	John Hunter Nemechek (i)	Joe Gibbs Racing	Toyota
21	Austin Hill	Richard Childress Racing	Chevrolet
26	Corey Heim (i)	Sam Hunt Racing	Toyota
27	Jeb Burton	Jordan Anderson Racing	Chevrolet
28	Kyle Sieg	RSS Racing	Ford
29	Blaine Perkins	RSS Racing	Ford
31	Parker Retzlaff	Jordan Anderson Racing	Chevrolet
32	Ryan Vargas	Jordan Anderson Racing	Chevrolet
35	Frankie Muniz	Joey Gase Motorsports	Ford
38	C. J. McLaughlin	RSS Racing	Ford
39	Ryan Sieg	RSS Racing	Ford
42	Leland Honeyman (R)	Young's Motorsports	Chevrolet
43	Ryan Ellis	Alpha Prime Racing	Chevrolet
44	Brennan Poole	Alpha Prime Racing	Chevrolet
48	Parker Kligerman	Big Machine Racing	Chevrolet
51	Jeremy Clements	Jeremy Clements Racing	Chevrolet
78	B. J. McLeod	B. J. McLeod Motorsports	Chevrolet
81	Chandler Smith	Joe Gibbs Racing	Toyota
91	Kyle Weatherman	DGM Racing	Chevrolet
92	Nick Leitz	DGM Racing	Chevrolet
97	Shane van Gisbergen (R)	Kaulig Racing	Chevrolet
98	Riley Herbst	Stewart–Haas Racing	Ford
Official entry list

== Practice ==
The first and only practice session was held on Saturday, March 9, at 9:30 AM MST, and would last for 20 minutes. John Hunter Nemechek, driving for Joe Gibbs Racing, would set the fastest time in the session, with a lap of 27.617, and a speed of 130.354 mph (209.784 km/h).

Pos.	#	Driver	Team	Make	Time	Speed
1	20	John Hunter Nemechek (i)	Joe Gibbs Racing	Toyota	27.617	130.354
2	81	Chandler Smith	Joe Gibbs Racing	Toyota	27.694	129.992
3	2	Jesse Love (R)	Richard Childress Racing	Chevrolet	27.799	129.501
Full practice results

== Qualifying ==
Qualifying was held on Saturday, March 9, at 11:00 AM MST. Since Phoenix Raceway is a one-mile speedway, the qualifying system used is a single-car, single-lap system with only one round. Whoever sets the fastest time in that round will win the pole.

Cole Custer, driving for Stewart–Haas Racing, would score the pole for the race, with a lap of 27.380, and a speed of 131.483 mph (211.601 km/h).

C. J. McLaughlin was the only driver who failed to qualify.

=== Qualifying results ===
Pos.	#	Driver	Team	Make	Time	Speed
1	00	Cole Custer	Stewart–Haas Racing	Ford	27.380	131.483
2	81	Chandler Smith	Joe Gibbs Racing	Toyota	27.507	130.876
3	26	Corey Heim (i)	Sam Hunt Racing	Toyota	27.507	130.876
4	98	Riley Herbst	Stewart–Haas Racing	Ford	27.510	130.862
5	7	Justin Allgaier	JR Motorsports	Chevrolet	27.603	130.421
6	18	Sheldon Creed	Joe Gibbs Racing	Toyota	27.655	130.175
7	2	Jesse Love (R)	Richard Childress Racing	Chevrolet	27.704	129.945
8	19	Aric Almirola	Joe Gibbs Racing	Toyota	27.750	129.730
9	20	John Hunter Nemechek (i)	Joe Gibbs Racing	Toyota	27.761	129.678
10	16	A. J. Allmendinger	Kaulig Racing	Chevrolet	27.773	129.622
11	9	Brandon Jones	JR Motorsports	Chevrolet	27.797	129.510
12	48	Parker Kligerman	Big Machine Racing	Chevrolet	27.807	129.464
13	39	Ryan Sieg	RSS Racing	Ford	27.810	129.450
14	91	Kyle Weatherman	DGM Racing	Chevrolet	27.834	129.338
15	21	Austin Hill	Richard Childress Racing	Chevrolet	27.867	129.185
16	8	Sammy Smith	JR Motorsports	Chevrolet	27.878	129.134
17	27	Jeb Burton	Jordan Anderson Racing	Chevrolet	27.918	128.949
18	31	Parker Retzlaff	Jordan Anderson Racing	Chevrolet	27.956	128.774
19	15	Hailie Deegan (R)	AM Racing	Ford	27.961	128.751
20	5	Anthony Alfredo	Our Motorsports	Chevrolet	27.981	128.659
21	1	Sam Mayer	JR Motorsports	Chevrolet	28.003	128.558
22	44	Brennan Poole	Alpha Prime Racing	Chevrolet	28.044	128.370
23	97	Shane van Gisbergen (R)	Kaulig Racing	Chevrolet	28.120	128.023
24	42	Leland Honeyman (R)	Young's Motorsports	Chevrolet	28.165	127.818
25	51	Jeremy Clements	Jeremy Clements Racing	Chevrolet	28.214	127.596
26	28	Kyle Sieg	RSS Racing	Ford	28.215	127.592
27	11	Josh Williams	Kaulig Racing	Chevrolet	28.316	127.137
28	17	William Byron (i)	Hendrick Motorsports	Chevrolet	28.321	127.114
29	78	B. J. McLeod	B. J. McLeod Motorsports	Chevrolet	28.362	126.930
30	43	Ryan Ellis	Alpha Prime Racing	Chevrolet	28.383	126.836
31	29	Blaine Perkins	RSS Racing	Ford	28.459	126.498
32	14	J. J. Yeley	SS-Green Light Racing	Chevrolet	28.672	125.558
33	4	Dawson Cram (R)	JD Motorsports	Chevrolet	28.764	124.156
Qualified by owner's points
34	92	Nick Leitz	DGM Racing	Chevrolet	28.903	124.555
35	35	Frankie Muniz	Joey Gase Motorsports	Ford	29.304	122.850
36	07	Patrick Emerling	SS-Green Light Racing	Chevrolet	30.073	119.709
37	32	Ryan Vargas	Jordan Anderson Racing	Chevrolet	–	–
38	6	Garrett Smithley	JD Motorsports	Chevrolet	–	–
Failed to qualify
39	38	C. J. McLaughlin	RSS Racing	Ford	29.025	124.031
Official qualifying results
Official starting lineup

== Race results ==
Stage 1 Laps: 45

Pos.	#	Driver	Team	Make	Pts
1	81	Chandler Smith	Joe Gibbs Racing	Toyota	10
2	00	Cole Custer	Stewart-Haas Racing	Ford	9
3	7	Justin Allgaier	JR Motorsports	Chevrolet	8
4	19	Aric Almirola	Joe Gibbs Racing	Toyota	7
5	98	Riley Herbst	Stewart-Haas Racing	Ford	6
6	9	Brandon Jones	JR Motorsports	Chevrolet	5
7	1	Sam Mayer	JR Motorsports	Chevrolet	4
8	26	Corey Heim (i)	Sam Hunt Racing	Toyota	0
9	20	John Hunter Nemechek (i)	Joe Gibbs Racing	Toyota	0
10	2	Jesse Love (R)	Richard Childress Racing	Chevrolet	1

Stage 2 Laps: 45

Pos.	#	Driver	Team	Make	Pts
1	00	Cole Custer	Stewart-Haas Racing	Ford	10
2	7	Justin Allgaier	JR Motorsports	Chevrolet	9
3	19	Aric Almirola	Joe Gibbs Racing	Toyota	8
4	81	Chandler Smith	Joe Gibbs Racing	Toyota	7
5	98	Riley Herbst	Stewart-Haas Racing	Ford	6
6	20	John Hunter Nemechek (i)	Joe Gibbs Racing	Toyota	0
7	1	Sam Mayer	JR Motorsports	Chevrolet	4
8	2	Jesse Love (R)	Richard Childress Racing	Chevrolet	3
9	9	Brandon Jones	JR Motorsports	Chevrolet	2
10	21	Austin Hill	Richard Childress Racing	Chevrolet	1

Stage 3 Laps: 115

Fin	St	#	Driver	Team	Make	Laps	Led	Status	Pts
1	2	81	Chandler Smith	Joe Gibbs Racing	Toyota	205	88	Running	57
2	7	2	Jesse Love (R)	Richard Childress Racing	Chevrolet	205	0	Running	39
3	6	18	Sheldon Creed	Joe Gibbs Racing	Toyota	205	0	Running	34
4	15	21	Austin Hill	Richard Childress Racing	Chevrolet	205	0	Running	34
5	1	00	Cole Custer	Stewart–Haas Racing	Ford	205	61	Running	51
6	23	97	Shane van Gisbergen (R)	Kaulig Racing	Chevrolet	205	0	Running	31
7	11	9	Brandon Jones	JR Motorsports	Chevrolet	205	0	Running	37
8	12	48	Parker Kligerman	Big Machine Racing	Chevrolet	205	0	Running	29
9	16	8	Sammy Smith	JR Motorsports	Chevrolet	205	0	Running	28
10	20	5	Anthony Alfredo	Our Motorsports	Chevrolet	205	0	Running	27
11	24	42	Leland Honeyman (R)	Young's Motorsports	Chevrolet	205	0	Running	26
12	13	39	Ryan Sieg	RSS Racing	Ford	205	0	Running	25
13	31	29	Blaine Perkins	RSS Racing	Ford	205	0	Running	24
14	29	78	B. J. McLeod	B. J. McLeod Motorsports	Chevrolet	205	0	Running	23
15	25	51	Jeremy Clements	Jeremy Clements Racing	Chevrolet	205	0	Running	22
16	14	91	Kyle Weatherman	DGM Racing	Chevrolet	205	0	Running	21
17	34	92	Nick Leitz	DGM Racing	Chevrolet	205	0	Running	20
18	10	16	A. J. Allmendinger	Kaulig Racing	Chevrolet	204	0	Running	19
19	32	14	J. J. Yeley	SS-Green Light Racing	Chevrolet	204	0	Running	18
20	22	44	Brennan Poole	Alpha Prime Racing	Chevrolet	204	0	Running	17
21	30	43	Ryan Ellis	Alpha Prime Racing	Chevrolet	204	0	Running	16
22	3	26	Corey Heim (i)	Sam Hunt Racing	Toyota	203	0	Running	0
23	28	17	William Byron (i)	Hendrick Motorsports	Chevrolet	202	0	Running	0
24	4	98	Riley Herbst	Stewart–Haas Racing	Ford	202	0	Running	25
25	26	28	Kyle Sieg	RSS Racing	Ford	201	0	Running	12
26	38	6	Garrett Smithley	JD Motorsports	Chevrolet	200	0	Running	11
27	27	11	Josh Williams	Kaulig Racing	Chevrolet	200	0	Running	10
28	33	4	Dawson Cram (R)	JD Motorsports	Chevrolet	198	0	Running	9
29	5	7	Justin Allgaier	JR Motorsports	Chevrolet	195	52	Accident	25
30	35	35	Frankie Muniz	Joey Gase Motorsports	Ford	156	0	Vibration	7
31	8	19	Aric Almirola	Joe Gibbs Racing	Toyota	154	0	Accident	21
32	9	20	John Hunter Nemechek (i)	Joe Gibbs Racing	Toyota	146	4	Accident	0
33	19	15	Hailie Deegan (R)	AM Racing	Ford	146	0	Accident	4
34	21	1	Sam Mayer	JR Motorsports	Chevrolet	143	0	Accident	11
35	18	31	Parker Retzlaff	Jordan Anderson Racing	Chevrolet	143	0	Accident	2
36	17	27	Jeb Burton	Jordan Anderson Racing	Chevrolet	143	0	Accident	1
37	37	32	Ryan Vargas	Jordan Anderson Racing	Chevrolet	17	0	Suspension	1
38	36	07	Patrick Emerling	SS-Green Light Racing	Chevrolet	5	0	Accident	1
Official race results

== Standings after the race ==
Drivers' Championship standings

	Pos	Driver	Points
1	1	Chandler Smith	183
1	2	Austin Hill	182 (-1)
2	3	Cole Custer	150 (–33)
1	4	Riley Herbst	146 (–37)
2	5	Jesse Love	135 (–48)
	6	Sheldon Creed	130 (–53)
3	7	A. J. Allmendinger	124 (–59)
	8	Justin Allgaier	119 (–64)
1	9	Brandon Jones	118 (–65)
1	10	Sammy Smith	114 (–69)
	11	Parker Kligerman	105 (–78)
	12	Anthony Alfredo	98 (–85)
Official driver's standings

Manufacturers' Championship standings

Pos	Manufacturer	Points
1	Chevrolet	148
2	Toyota	140 (–8)
3	Ford	120 (–28)

- Note: Only the first 12 positions are included for the driver standings.

Previous race: 2024 The LiUNA!	NASCAR Xfinity Series; 2024 season	Next race: 2024 Focused Health 250 (COTA)
