= 2025 Focused Health 302 =

30th race of the 2025 NASCAR Xfinity Series

Race details
- Race 30 of 33 of the 2025 NASCAR Xfinity Series
- Date: October 11, 2025
- Location: Las Vegas Motor Speedway in Las Vegas, Nevada
- Course: Permanent racing facility
- Course length: 1.5 miles (2.4 km)
- Distance: 201 laps, 301.5 mi (485.22 km)
- Average speed: 135.489 mph (218.048 km/h)

Pole position
Driver	Justin Allgaier	JR Motorsports
- Time: 30.157

Most laps led
Driver	Aric Almirola	Joe Gibbs Racing
- Laps: 107

Winner
No. 19	Aric Almirola	Joe Gibbs Racing

Television in the United States
- Network: CW
- Announcers: Adam Alexander, Parker Kligerman, and Jamie McMurray

Radio in the United States
- Radio: PRN

The 2025 Focused Health 302 was the 30th stock car race of the 2025 NASCAR Xfinity Series, the first race of the Round of 8, and the 8th iteration of the event. The race was held on Saturday, October 11, 2025, at Las Vegas Motor Speedway in Las Vegas, Nevada, a 1.5 miles (2.4 km) permanent quad-oval shaped intermediate speedway. The race took the scheduled 201 laps to complete.

Aric Almirola, driving for Joe Gibbs Racing, would pull off a dominating performance, winning both stages and led a race-high 107 laps, holding off Connor Zilisch in the final few laps to earn his 10th career NASCAR Xfinity Series win, and his third of the season. He also advanced the No. 19 car into the championship 4 of the owner's playoffs. To fill out the podium, Justin Allgaier, driving for JR Motorsports, would finish in 3rd, respectively.

== Report ==
=== Background ===
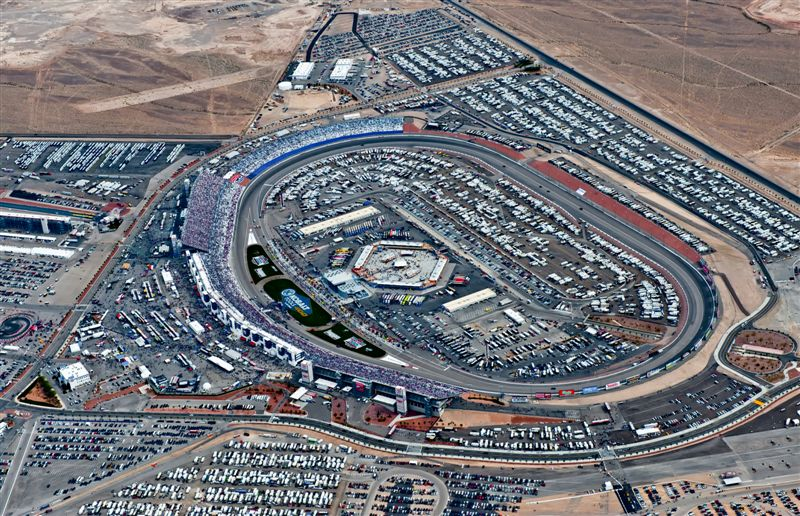
Las Vegas Motor Speedway, the track where the race will be held.

Las Vegas Motor Speedway, located in Clark County, Nevada outside the Las Vegas city limits and about 15 miles northeast of the Las Vegas Strip, is a 1,200-acre (490 ha) complex of multiple tracks for motorsports racing. The complex is owned by Speedway Motorsports, which is headquartered in Charlotte, North Carolina.

=== Entry list ===
- (R) denotes rookie driver.
- (i) denotes driver who is ineligible for series driver points.
- (P) denotes playoff driver.
- (OP) denotes owner's playoff car.

#	Driver	Team	Make
00	Sheldon Creed (P)	Haas Factory Team	Ford
1	Carson Kvapil (P) (R)	JR Motorsports	Chevrolet
2	Jesse Love (P)	Richard Childress Racing	Chevrolet
4	Parker Retzlaff	Alpha Prime Racing	Chevrolet
07	Nick Leitz	SS-Green Light Racing	Chevrolet
7	Justin Allgaier (P)	JR Motorsports	Chevrolet
8	Sammy Smith (P)	JR Motorsports	Chevrolet
10	Daniel Dye (R)	Kaulig Racing	Chevrolet
11	Daniel Hemric (i)	Kaulig Racing	Chevrolet
14	Garrett Smithley	SS-Green Light Racing	Chevrolet
16	Christian Eckes (R)	Kaulig Racing	Chevrolet
17	Corey Day	Hendrick Motorsports	Chevrolet
18	William Sawalich (R)	Joe Gibbs Racing	Toyota
19	Aric Almirola (OP)	Joe Gibbs Racing	Toyota
20	Brandon Jones (P)	Joe Gibbs Racing	Toyota
21	Austin Hill (OP)	Richard Childress Racing	Chevrolet
24	Trevor Bayne (i)	Sam Hunt Racing	Toyota
25	Harrison Burton	AM Racing	Ford
26	Dean Thompson (R)	Sam Hunt Racing	Toyota
27	Jeb Burton	Jordan Anderson Racing	Chevrolet
28	Kyle Sieg	RSS Racing	Ford
31	Blaine Perkins	Jordan Anderson Racing	Chevrolet
32	Austin Green	Jordan Anderson Racing	Chevrolet
35	Mason Maggio	Joey Gase Motorsports	Ford
39	Ryan Sieg	RSS Racing	Ford
41	Sam Mayer (P)	Haas Factory Team	Ford
42	Anthony Alfredo	Young's Motorsports	Chevrolet
44	Brennan Poole	Alpha Prime Racing	Chevrolet
45	Mason Massey	Alpha Prime Racing	Chevrolet
48	Nick Sanchez (R)	Big Machine Racing	Chevrolet
50	Preston Pardus	Pardus Racing	Chevrolet
51	Jeremy Clements	Jeremy Clements Racing	Chevrolet
53	Joey Gase	Joey Gase Motorsports	Chevrolet
54	Taylor Gray (R)	Joe Gibbs Racing	Toyota
70	Thomas Annunziata	Cope Family Racing	Chevrolet
71	Ryan Ellis	DGM Racing	Chevrolet
88	Connor Zilisch (P) (R)	JR Motorsports	Chevrolet
91	Josh Williams	DGM Racing	Chevrolet
99	Matt DiBenedetto	Viking Motorsports	Chevrolet
Official entry list

== Practice ==
For practice, drivers were separated into two groups, A and B. Both sessions were 25 minutes long, and was held on Saturday, October 11, at 11:00 AM PST. Taylor Gray, driving for Joe Gibbs Racing, would set the fastest time between both groups, with a lap of 30.557, and a speed of 176.719 mph (284.402 km/h).

Pos.	#	Driver	Team	Make	Time	Speed
1	54	Taylor Gray (R)	Joe Gibbs Racing	Toyota	30.557	176.719
2	39	Ryan Sieg	RSS Racing	Ford	30.577	176.603
3	48	Nick Sanchez (R)	Big Machine Racing	Chevrolet	30.596	176.494
Full practice results

== Qualifying ==
Qualifying was held on Saturday, October 11, at 12:05 PM PST. Since Las Vegas Motor Speedway is an intermediate racetrack, the qualifying procedure used is a single-car, one-lap system with one round. Drivers will be on track by themselves and will have one lap to post a qualifying time, and whoever sets the fastest time will win the pole.

Justin Allgaier, driving for JR Motorsports, would score the pole for the race, with a lap of 30.157, and a speed of 179.063 mph (288.174 km/h).

No drivers would fail to qualify.

=== Qualifying results ===
Pos.	#	Driver	Team	Make	Time	Speed
1	7	Justin Allgaier (P)	JR Motorsports	Chevrolet	30.157	179.063
2	88	Connor Zilisch (P) (R)	JR Motorsports	Chevrolet	30.215	178.719
3	20	Brandon Jones (P)	Joe Gibbs Racing	Toyota	30.361	177.860
4	19	Aric Almirola (OP)	Joe Gibbs Racing	Toyota	30.384	177.725
5	48	Nick Sanchez (R)	Big Machine Racing	Chevrolet	30.402	177.620
6	2	Jesse Love (P)	Richard Childress Racing	Chevrolet	30.414	177.550
7	16	Christian Eckes (R)	Kaulig Racing	Chevrolet	30.441	177.392
8	54	Taylor Gray (R)	Joe Gibbs Racing	Toyota	30.504	177.026
9	1	Carson Kvapil (P) (R)	JR Motorsports	Chevrolet	30.520	176.933
10	00	Sheldon Creed (P)	Haas Factory Team	Ford	30.547	176.777
11	18	William Sawalich (R)	Joe Gibbs Racing	Toyota	30.672	176.056
12	21	Austin Hill (OP)	Richard Childress Racing	Chevrolet	30.675	176.039
13	11	Daniel Hemric (i)	Kaulig Racing	Chevrolet	30.675	176.039
14	39	Ryan Sieg	RSS Racing	Ford	30.704	175.873
15	8	Sammy Smith (P)	JR Motorsports	Chevrolet	30.740	175.667
16	41	Sam Mayer (P)	Haas Factory Team	Ford	30.775	175.467
17	99	Matt DiBenedetto	Viking Motorsports	Chevrolet	30.787	175.399
18	10	Daniel Dye (R)	Kaulig Racing	Chevrolet	30.812	175.256
19	17	Corey Day	Hendrick Motorsports	Chevrolet	30.813	175.251
20	25	Harrison Burton	AM Racing	Ford	30.832	175.143
21	51	Jeremy Clements	Jeremy Clements Racing	Chevrolet	30.833	175.137
22	27	Jeb Burton	Jordan Anderson Racing	Chevrolet	30.967	174.379
23	26	Dean Thompson (R)	Sam Hunt Racing	Toyota	31.092	173.678
24	28	Kyle Sieg	RSS Racing	Ford	31.146	173.377
25	42	Anthony Alfredo	Young's Motorsports	Chevrolet	31.165	173.271
26	24	Trevor Bayne (i)	Sam Hunt Racing	Toyota	31.196	173.099
27	91	Josh Williams	DGM Racing	Chevrolet	31.399	171.980
28	31	Blaine Perkins	Jordan Anderson Racing	Chevrolet	31.449	171.707
29	70	Thomas Annunziata	Cope Family Racing	Chevrolet	31.452	171.690
30	45	Mason Massey	Alpha Prime Racing	Chevrolet	31.482	171.527
31	44	Brennan Poole	Alpha Prime Racing	Chevrolet	31.491	171.478
32	53	Joey Gase	Joey Gase Motorsports	Chevrolet	31.548	171.168
Qualified by owner's points
33	32	Austin Green	Jordan Anderson Racing	Chevrolet	31.563	171.086
34	07	Nick Leitz	SS-Green Light Racing	Chevrolet	31.754	170.057
35	35	Mason Maggio	Joey Gase Motorsports	Ford	31.887	169.348
36	14	Garrett Smithley	SS-Green Light Racing	Chevrolet	32.071	168.376
37	4	Parker Retzlaff	Alpha Prime Racing	Chevrolet	–	–
38	71	Ryan Ellis	DGM Racing	Chevrolet	–	–
Official qualifying results
Official starting lineup

== Race results ==
Stage 1 Laps: 45

Pos.	#	Driver	Team	Make	Pts
1	19	Aric Almirola (OP)	Joe Gibbs Racing	Toyota	10
2	88	Connor Zilisch (P) (R)	JR Motorsports	Chevrolet	9
3	2	Jesse Love (P)	Richard Childress Racing	Chevrolet	8
4	7	Justin Allgaier (P)	JR Motorsports	Chevrolet	7
5	39	Ryan Sieg	RSS Racing	Ford	6
6	21	Austin Hill (OP)	Richard Childress Racing	Chevrolet	5
7	16	Christian Eckes (R)	Kaulig Racing	Chevrolet	4
8	41	Sam Mayer (P)	Haas Factory Team	Ford	3
9	54	Taylor Gray (R)	Joe Gibbs Racing	Toyota	2
10	48	Nick Sanchez (R)	Big Machine Racing	Chevrolet	1

Stage 2 Laps: 45

Pos.	#	Driver	Team	Make	Pts
1	19	Aric Almirola (OP)	Joe Gibbs Racing	Toyota	10
2	2	Jesse Love (P)	Richard Childress Racing	Chevrolet	9
3	88	Connor Zilisch (P) (R)	JR Motorsports	Chevrolet	8
4	7	Justin Allgaier (P)	JR Motorsports	Chevrolet	7
5	39	Ryan Sieg	RSS Racing	Ford	6
6	21	Austin Hill (OP)	Richard Childress Racing	Chevrolet	5
7	16	Christian Eckes (R)	Kaulig Racing	Chevrolet	4
8	41	Sam Mayer (P)	Haas Factory Team	Ford	3
9	17	Corey Day	Hendrick Motorsports	Chevrolet	2
10	1	Carson Kvapil (P) (R)	JR Motorsports	Chevrolet	1

Stage 3 Laps: 111

Fin	St	#	Driver	Team	Make	Laps	Led	Status	Pts
1	4	19	Aric Almirola (OP)	Joe Gibbs Racing	Toyota	201	107	Running	60
2	2	88	Connor Zilisch (P) (R)	JR Motorsports	Chevrolet	201	34	Running	53
3	1	7	Justin Allgaier (P)	JR Motorsports	Chevrolet	201	28	Running	48
4	19	17	Corey Day	Hendrick Motorsports	Chevrolet	201	0	Running	35
5	5	48	Nick Sanchez (R)	Big Machine Racing	Chevrolet	201	1	Running	33
6	6	2	Jesse Love (P)	Richard Childress Racing	Chevrolet	201	22	Running	48
7	14	39	Ryan Sieg	RSS Racing	Ford	201	0	Running	42
8	8	54	Taylor Gray (R)	Joe Gibbs Racing	Toyota	201	0	Running	31
9	16	41	Sam Mayer (P)	Haas Factory Team	Ford	201	0	Running	34
10	12	21	Austin Hill (OP)	Richard Childress Racing	Chevrolet	201	0	Running	37
11	10	00	Sheldon Creed (P)	Haas Factory Team	Ford	201	0	Running	26
12	11	18	William Sawalich (R)	Joe Gibbs Racing	Toyota	201	0	Running	25
13	3	20	Brandon Jones (P)	Joe Gibbs Racing	Toyota	201	1	Running	24
14	20	25	Harrison Burton	AM Racing	Ford	201	0	Running	23
15	9	1	Carson Kvapil (P) (R)	JR Motorsports	Chevrolet	201	0	Running	23
16	13	11	Daniel Hemric (i)	Kaulig Racing	Chevrolet	201	4	Running	0
17	18	10	Daniel Dye (R)	Kaulig Racing	Chevrolet	201	2	Running	20
18	7	16	Christian Eckes (R)	Kaulig Racing	Chevrolet	201	0	Running	27
19	17	99	Matt DiBenedetto	Viking Motorsports	Chevrolet	201	0	Running	18
20	15	8	Sammy Smith (P)	JR Motorsports	Chevrolet	201	0	Running	17
21	24	28	Kyle Sieg	RSS Racing	Ford	201	2	Running	16
22	26	24	Trevor Bayne (i)	Sam Hunt Racing	Toyota	201	0	Running	0
23	27	91	Josh Williams	DGM Racing	Chevrolet	201	0	Running	14
24	25	42	Anthony Alfredo	Young's Motorsports	Chevrolet	201	0	Running	13
25	31	44	Brennan Poole	Alpha Prime Racing	Chevrolet	201	0	Running	12
26	22	27	Jeb Burton	Jordan Anderson Racing	Chevrolet	201	0	Running	11
27	28	31	Blaine Perkins	Jordan Anderson Racing	Chevrolet	201	0	Running	10
28	23	26	Dean Thompson (R)	Sam Hunt Racing	Toyota	200	0	Running	9
29	38	71	Ryan Ellis	DGM Racing	Chevrolet	200	0	Running	8
30	37	4	Parker Retzlaff	Alpha Prime Racing	Chevrolet	200	0	Running	7
31	33	32	Austin Green	Jordan Anderson Racing	Chevrolet	199	0	Running	6
32	36	14	Garrett Smithley	SS-Green Light Racing	Chevrolet	199	0	Running	5
33	35	35	Mason Maggio	Joey Gase Motorsports	Ford	198	0	Running	4
34	34	07	Nick Leitz	SS-Green Light Racing	Chevrolet	198	0	Running	3
35	32	53	Joey Gase	Joey Gase Motorsports	Chevrolet	196	0	Running	2
36	21	51	Jeremy Clements	Jeremy Clements Racing	Chevrolet	146	0	Transmission	1
37	30	45	Mason Massey	Alpha Prime Racing	Chevrolet	84	0	Suspension	1
38	29	70	Thomas Annunziata	Cope Family Racing	Chevrolet	68	0	Transmission	1
Official race results

== Standings after the race ==
Drivers' Championship standings

	Pos	Driver	Points
	1	Connor Zilisch	3,124
	2	Justin Allgaier	3,086 (–38)
2	3	Jesse Love	3,062 (–62)
	4	Sam Mayer	3,050 (–74)
2	5	Brandon Jones	3,042 (–82)
2	6	Sheldon Creed	3,029 (–95)
	7	Carson Kvapil	3,028 (–96)
2	8	Sammy Smith	3,026 (–98)
	9	Taylor Gray	2,131 (–993)
	10	Nick Sanchez	2,125 (–999)
	11	Austin Hill	2,117 (–1,007)
	12	Harrison Burton	2,083 (–1,041)
Official driver's standings

Manufacturers' Championship standings

Pos	Manufacturer	Points
1	Chevrolet	1,163
2	Toyota	994 (–169)
3	Ford	936 (–227)

- Note: Only the first 12 positions are included for the driver standings.

Previous race: 2025 Blue Cross NC 250	NASCAR Xfinity Series; 2025 season	Next race: 2025 United Rentals 250
