= 2024 The LiUNA! =

3rd race of the 2024 NASCAR Xfinity Series

Race details
- Race 3 of 33 of the 2024 NASCAR Xfinity Series
- Date: March 2, 2024
- Official name: 28th Annual The LiUNA!
- Location: Las Vegas Motor Speedway in North Las Vegas, Nevada
- Course: Permanent racing facility
- Course length: 1.5 miles (2.4 km)
- Distance: 200 laps, 300 mi (482 km)
- Scheduled distance: 200 laps, 300 mi (482 km)
- Average speed: 137.143 mph (220.710 km/h)

Pole position
Driver	Cole Custer	Stewart–Haas Racing
- Time: 29.788

Most laps led
Driver	John Hunter Nemechek	Joe Gibbs Racing
- Laps: 99

Winner
No. 20	John Hunter Nemechek	Joe Gibbs Racing

Television in the United States
- Network: FS1
- Announcers: Adam Alexander, Joey Logano, and Austin Cindric

Radio in the United States
- Radio: PRN

The 2024 The LiUNA! was the 3rd stock car race of the 2024 NASCAR Xfinity Series, and the 28th iteration of the event. The race was held on Saturday, March 2, 2024, at Las Vegas Motor Speedway in North Las Vegas, Nevada, a 1.5 miles (2.4 km) permanent asphalt quad-oval shaped intermediate speedway. The race took the scheduled 200 laps to complete. John Hunter Nemechek, driving for Joe Gibbs Racing, won the race leading a race-high 99 laps and earning his 10th career NASCAR Xfinity Series win, and his first of the season. Nemechek's teammate, Chandler Smith, won both stages and led 74 laps, but fell back in the final stage and finished 3rd. To fill out the podium, Cole Custer, driving for Stewart–Haas Racing, and Smith, driving for Joe Gibbs Racing, would finish 2nd and 3rd, respectively.

== Report ==
=== Background ===
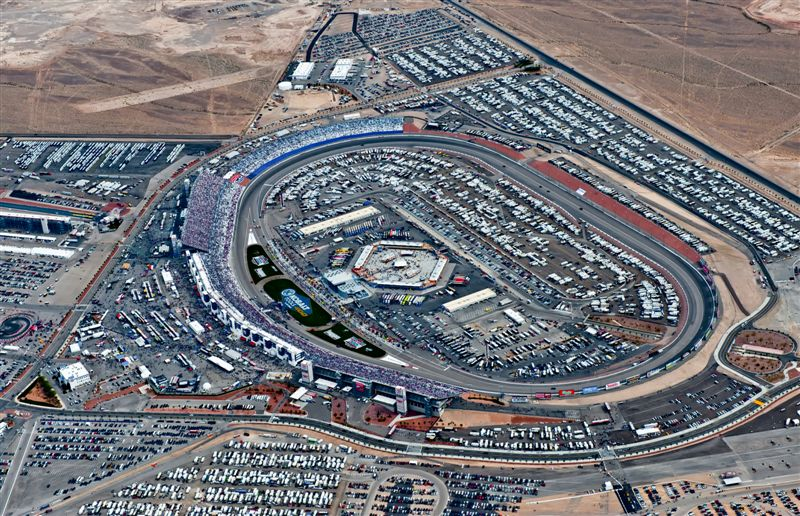
Las Vegas Motor Speedway, the circuit where the race was held.

Las Vegas Motor Speedway, located in Clark County, Nevada outside the Las Vegas city limits and about 15 miles northeast of the Las Vegas Strip, is a 1,200-acre (490 ha) complex of multiple tracks for motorsports racing. The complex is owned by Speedway Motorsports, Inc., which is headquartered in Charlotte, North Carolina.

==== Entry list ====
- (R) denotes rookie driver.
- (i) denotes driver who is ineligible for series driver points.

#	Driver	Team	Make
00	Cole Custer	Stewart–Haas Racing	Ford
1	Sam Mayer	JR Motorsports	Chevrolet
2	Jesse Love (R)	Richard Childress Racing	Chevrolet
4	Dawson Cram (R)	JD Motorsports	Chevrolet
5	Anthony Alfredo	Our Motorsports	Chevrolet
6	Garrett Smithley	JD Motorsports	Chevrolet
07	Patrick Emerling	SS-Green Light Racing	Chevrolet
7	Justin Allgaier	JR Motorsports	Chevrolet
8	Sammy Smith	JR Motorsports	Chevrolet
9	Brandon Jones	JR Motorsports	Chevrolet
11	Josh Williams	Kaulig Racing	Chevrolet
14	J. J. Yeley	SS-Green Light Racing	Chevrolet
15	Hailie Deegan (R)	AM Racing	Ford
16	A. J. Allmendinger	Kaulig Racing	Chevrolet
18	Sheldon Creed	Joe Gibbs Racing	Toyota
19	Aric Almirola	Joe Gibbs Racing	Toyota
20	John Hunter Nemechek (i)	Joe Gibbs Racing	Toyota
21	Austin Hill	Richard Childress Racing	Chevrolet
26	Corey Heim (i)	Sam Hunt Racing	Toyota
27	Jeb Burton	Jordan Anderson Racing	Chevrolet
28	Kyle Sieg	RSS Racing	Ford
29	Blaine Perkins	RSS Racing	Ford
31	Parker Retzlaff	Jordan Anderson Racing	Chevrolet
32	Sage Karam	Jordan Anderson Racing	Chevrolet
35	Joey Gase	Joey Gase Motorsports	Chevrolet
38	C. J. McLaughlin	RSS Racing	Ford
39	Ryan Sieg	RSS Racing	Ford
42	Leland Honeyman (R)	Young's Motorsports	Chevrolet
43	Ryan Ellis	Alpha Prime Racing	Chevrolet
44	Brennan Poole	Alpha Prime Racing	Chevrolet
48	Parker Kligerman	Big Machine Racing	Chevrolet
51	Jeremy Clements	Jeremy Clements Racing	Chevrolet
78	B. J. McLeod	B. J. McLeod Motorsports	Chevrolet
81	Chandler Smith	Joe Gibbs Racing	Toyota
91	Kyle Weatherman	DGM Racing	Chevrolet
92	Nick Leitz	DGM Racing	Chevrolet
97	Shane van Gisbergen (R)	Kaulig Racing	Chevrolet
98	Riley Herbst	Stewart–Haas Racing	Ford
Official entry list

== Practice ==
The first and only practice session was held on Friday, March 1, at 3:35 pm PST, and would last for 20 minutes. Brandon Jones, driving for JR Motorsports, would set the fastest time in the session, with a lap of 30.423, and a speed of 177.497 mph (285.654 km/h).

Pos.	#	Driver	Team	Make	Time	Speed
1	9	Brandon Jones	JR Motorsports	Chevrolet	30.423	177.497
2	00	Cole Custer	Stewart–Haas Racing	Ford	30.425	177.486
3	31	Parker Retzlaff	Jordan Anderson Racing	Chevrolet	30.525	176.904
Full practice results

== Qualifying ==
Qualifying was held on Friday, March 1, at 4:05 pm PST. Since Las Vegas Motor Speedway is an intermediate speedway, the qualifying system used is a single-car, single-lap system with only one round. Whoever sets the fastest time in that round will win the pole.

Cole Custer, driving for Stewart–Haas Racing, would score the pole for the race, with a lap of 29.778, and a speed of 181.281 mph (291.743 km/h).

No drivers would fail to qualify.

=== Qualifying results ===
Pos.	#	Driver	Team	Make	Time	Speed
1	00	Cole Custer	Stewart–Haas Racing	Ford	29.778	181.281
2	81	Chandler Smith	Joe Gibbs Racing	Toyota	29.805	181.178
3	16	A. J. Allmendinger	Kaulig Racing	Chevrolet	29.904	180.578
4	31	Parker Retzlaff	Jordan Anderson Racing	Chevrolet	29.987	180.078
5	21	Austin Hill	Richard Childress Racing	Chevrolet	30.012	179.928
6	39	Ryan Sieg	RSS Racing	Ford	30.023	179.862
7	48	Parker Kligerman	Big Machine Racing	Chevrolet	30.037	179.778
8	8	Sammy Smith	JR Motorsports	Chevrolet	30.062	179.629
9	18	Sheldon Creed	Joe Gibbs Racing	Toyota	30.072	179.569
10	19	Aric Almirola	Joe Gibbs Racing	Toyota	30.165	179.015
11	98	Riley Herbst	Stewart–Haas Racing	Ford	30.209	178.755
12	20	John Hunter Nemechek (i)	Joe Gibbs Racing	Toyota	30.232	178.619
13	9	Brandon Jones	JR Motorsports	Chevrolet	30.289	178.283
14	1	Sam Mayer	JR Motorsports	Chevrolet	30.292	178.265
15	2	Jesse Love (R)	Richard Childress Racing	Chevrolet	30.292	178.265
16	26	Corey Heim (i)	Sam Hunt Racing	Toyota	30.314	178.136
17	51	Jeremy Clements	Jeremy Clements Racing	Chevrolet	30.336	178.006
18	44	Brennan Poole	Alpha Prime Racing	Chevrolet	30.519	176.939
19	42	Leland Honeyman (R)	Young's Motorsports	Chevrolet	30.633	176.280
20	91	Kyle Weatherman	DGM Racing	Chevrolet	30.666	176.091
21	27	Jeb Burton	Jordan Anderson Racing	Chevrolet	30.714	175.816
22	14	J. J. Yeley	SS-Green Light Racing	Chevrolet	30.809	175.273
23	43	Ryan Ellis	Alpha Prime Racing	Chevrolet	30.815	175.239
24	78	B. J. McLeod	B. J. McLeod Motorsports	Chevrolet	30.961	174.413
25	97	Shane van Gisbergen (R)	Kaulig Racing	Chevrolet	31.053	173.896
26	4	Dawson Cram (R)	JD Motorsports	Chevrolet	31.096	173.656
27	28	Kyle Sieg	RSS Racing	Ford	31.155	173.327
28	15	Hailie Deegan (R)	AM Racing	Ford	31.250	172.800
29	29	Blaine Perkins	RSS Racing	Ford	31.305	172.496
30	07	Patrick Emerling	SS-Green Light Racing	Chevrolet	31.311	172.463
31	92	Nick Leitz	DGM Racing	Chevrolet	31.367	172.155
32	11	Josh Williams	Kaulig Racing	Chevrolet	31.597	170.902
33	6	Garrett Smithley	JD Motorsports	Chevrolet	31.862	169.481
Qualified by owner's points
34	38	C. J. McLaughlin	RSS Racing	Ford	32.234	167.525
35	32	Sage Karam	Jordan Anderson Racing	Chevrolet	32.297	167.198
36	7	Justin Allgaier	JR Motorsports	Chevrolet	–	–
37	5	Anthony Alfredo	Our Motorsports	Chevrolet	–	–
38	35	Joey Gase	Joey Gase Motorsports	Chevrolet	–	–
Official qualifying results
Official starting lineup

== Race results ==
Stage 1 Laps: 45

Pos.	#	Driver	Team	Make	Pts
1	81	Chandler Smith	Joe Gibbs Racing	Toyota	10
2	20	John Hunter Nemechek (i)	Joe Gibbs Racing	Toyota	0
3	21	Austin Hill	Richard Childress Racing	Chevrolet	8
4	98	Riley Herbst	Stewart–Haas Racing	Ford	7
5	00	Cole Custer	Stewart–Haas Racing	Ford	6
6	16	A. J. Allmendinger	Kaulig Racing	Chevrolet	5
7	7	Justin Allgaier	JR Motorsports	Chevrolet	4
8	48	Parker Kligerman	Big Machine Racing	Chevrolet	3
9	39	Ryan Sieg	RSS Racing	Ford	2
10	9	Brandon Jones	JR Motorsports	Chevrolet	1

Stage 2 Laps: 45

Pos.	#	Driver	Team	Make	Pts
1	81	Chandler Smith	Joe Gibbs Racing	Toyota	10
2	20	John Hunter Nemechek (i)	Joe Gibbs Racing	Toyota	0
3	98	Riley Herbst	Stewart–Haas Racing	Ford	8
4	7	Justin Allgaier	JR Motorsports	Chevrolet	7
5	16	A. J. Allmendinger	Kaulig Racing	Chevrolet	6
6	21	Austin Hill	Richard Childress Racing	Chevrolet	5
7	2	Jesse Love (R)	Richard Childress Racing	Chevrolet	4
8	48	Parker Kligerman	Big Machine Racing	Chevrolet	3
9	00	Cole Custer	Stewart–Haas Racing	Ford	2
10	39	Ryan Sieg	RSS Racing	Ford	1

Stage 3 Laps: 110

Fin	St	#	Driver	Team	Make	Laps	Led	Status	Pts
1	12	20	John Hunter Nemechek (i)	Joe Gibbs Racing	Toyota	200	99	Running	0
2	1	00	Cole Custer	Stewart–Haas Racing	Ford	200	0	Running	43
3	2	81	Chandler Smith	Joe Gibbs Racing	Toyota	200	74	Running	54
4	5	21	Austin Hill	Richard Childress Racing	Chevrolet	200	6	Running	46
5	11	98	Riley Herbst	Stewart–Haas Racing	Ford	200	0	Running	47
6	3	16	A. J. Allmendinger	Kaulig Racing	Chevrolet	200	0	Running	42
7	6	39	Ryan Sieg	RSS Racing	Ford	200	0	Running	33
8	8	8	Sammy Smith	JR Motorsports	Chevrolet	200	0	Running	29
9	13	9	Brandon Jones	JR Motorsports	Chevrolet	200	0	Running	29
10	36	7	Justin Allgaier	JR Motorsports	Chevrolet	200	11	Running	38
11	7	48	Parker Kligerman	Big Machine Racing	Chevrolet	200	0	Running	32
12	10	19	Aric Almirola	Joe Gibbs Racing	Toyota	200	0	Running	25
13	16	26	Corey Heim (i)	Sam Hunt Racing	Toyota	200	0	Running	0
14	32	11	Josh Williams	Kaulig Racing	Chevrolet	199	10	Running	23
15	28	15	Hailie Deegan (R)	AM Racing	Ford	199	0	Running	22
16	37	5	Anthony Alfredo	Our Motorsports	Chevrolet	199	0	Running	21
17	15	2	Jesse Love (R)	Richard Childress Racing	Chevrolet	199	0	Running	24
18	19	42	Leland Honeyman (R)	Young's Motorsports	Chevrolet	199	0	Running	19
19	18	44	Brennan Poole	Alpha Prime Racing	Chevrolet	199	0	Running	18
20	27	28	Kyle Sieg	RSS Racing	Ford	199	0	Running	17
21	20	91	Kyle Weatherman	DGM Racing	Chevrolet	199	0	Running	16
22	23	43	Ryan Ellis	Alpha Prime Racing	Chevrolet	199	0	Running	15
23	21	27	Jeb Burton	Jordan Anderson Racing	Chevrolet	198	0	Running	14
24	22	14	J. J. Yeley	SS-Green Light Racing	Chevrolet	198	0	Running	13
25	17	51	Jeremy Clements	Jeremy Clements Racing	Chevrolet	197	0	Running	12
26	9	18	Sheldon Creed	Joe Gibbs Racing	Toyota	197	0	Running	11
27	31	92	Nick Leitz	DGM Racing	Chevrolet	197	0	Running	10
28	30	07	Patrick Emerling	SS-Green Light Racing	Chevrolet	196	0	Running	9
29	33	6	Garrett Smithley	JD Motorsports	Chevrolet	195	0	Running	8
30	38	35	Joey Gase	Joey Gase Motorsports	Chevrolet	195	0	Running	7
31	29	29	Blaine Perkins	RSS Racing	Ford	195	0	Running	6
32	24	78	B. J. McLeod	B. J. McLeod Motorsports	Chevrolet	195	0	Running	5
33	34	38	C. J. McLaughlin	RSS Racing	Ford	194	0	Running	4
34	26	4	Dawson Cram (R)	JD Motorsports	Chevrolet	192	0	Running	3
35	4	31	Parker Retzlaff	Jordan Anderson Racing	Chevrolet	115	0	Fuel Pump	2
36	35	32	Sage Karam	Jordan Anderson Racing	Chevrolet	104	0	Transmission	1
37	25	97	Shane van Gisbergen (R)	Kaulig Racing	Chevrolet	27	0	Engine	1
38	14	1	Sam Mayer	JR Motorsports	Chevrolet	7	0	Accident	1
Official race results

== Standings after the race ==
Drivers' Championship standings

	Pos	Driver	Points
	1	Austin Hill	148
2	2	Chandler Smith	126 (-22)
	3	Riley Herbst	121 (–27)
4	4	A. J. Allmendinger	105 (–43)
7	5	Cole Custer	99 (–49)
4	6	Sheldon Creed	96 (–52)
2	7	Jesse Love	96 (–52)
3	8	Justin Allgaier	94 (–54)
1	9	Sammy Smith	86 (–62)
3	10	Brandon Jones	81 (–67)
4	11	Parker Kligerman	76 (–72)
2	12	Anthony Alfredo	71 (–77)
Official driver's standings

Manufacturers' Championship standings

Pos	Manufacturer	Points
1	Chevrolet	113
2	Toyota	110 (–3)
3	Ford	88 (–25)

- Note: Only the first 12 positions are included for the driver standings.

Previous race: 2024 Raptor King of Tough 250	NASCAR Xfinity Series; 2024 season	Next race: 2024 Call811.com Every Dig. Every Time. 200
