= 2025 GOVX 200 =

4th race of the 2025 NASCAR Xfinity Series

Race details
- Race 4 of 33 of the 2025 NASCAR Xfinity Series
- Date: March 8, 2025
- Official name: 21st Annual GOVX 200
- Location: Phoenix Raceway in Avondale, Arizona
- Course: Permanent racing facility
- Course length: 1 miles (1.6 km)
- Distance: 208 laps, 208 mi (334 km)
- Scheduled distance: 200 laps, 200 mi (320 km)
- Average speed: 91.990 mph (148.044 km/h)

Pole position
Driver	Alex Bowman	Hendrick Motorsports
- Time: 27.276

Most laps led
Driver	Justin Allgaier	JR Motorsports
- Laps: 130

Winner
No. 19	Aric Almirola	Joe Gibbs Racing

Television in the United States
- Network: The CW
- Announcers: Adam Alexander, Jamie McMurray, and Parker Kligerman

Radio in the United States
- Radio: MRN

The 2025 GOVX 200 was the 4th stock car race of the 2025 NASCAR Xfinity Series, and the 21st iteration of the event. The race was held on Saturday, March 8, 2025, at Phoenix Raceway in Avondale, Arizona, a 1 mile (1.6 km) permanent tri-oval shaped racetrack. The race was originally scheduled to be contested over 200 laps, but was increased to 208 laps due to an overtime finish.

After a late-race caution, Aric Almirola, driving for Joe Gibbs Racing, took over the lead from Justin Allgaier and made a last lap pass on Alex Bowman in an exciting photo finish to earn his eighth career NASCAR Xfinity Series win, and his first of the season. Almirola beat Bowman by 0.045 seconds, the 26th closest finish in Xfinity Series history. Allgaier was the most dominant driver of the race, winning the second stage and leading a race-high 130 laps, before getting shuffled back on the final restart and finishing 5th. To fill out the podium, Brandon Jones, driving for Joe Gibbs Racing, would finish in 3rd, respectively.

== Report ==
=== Background ===
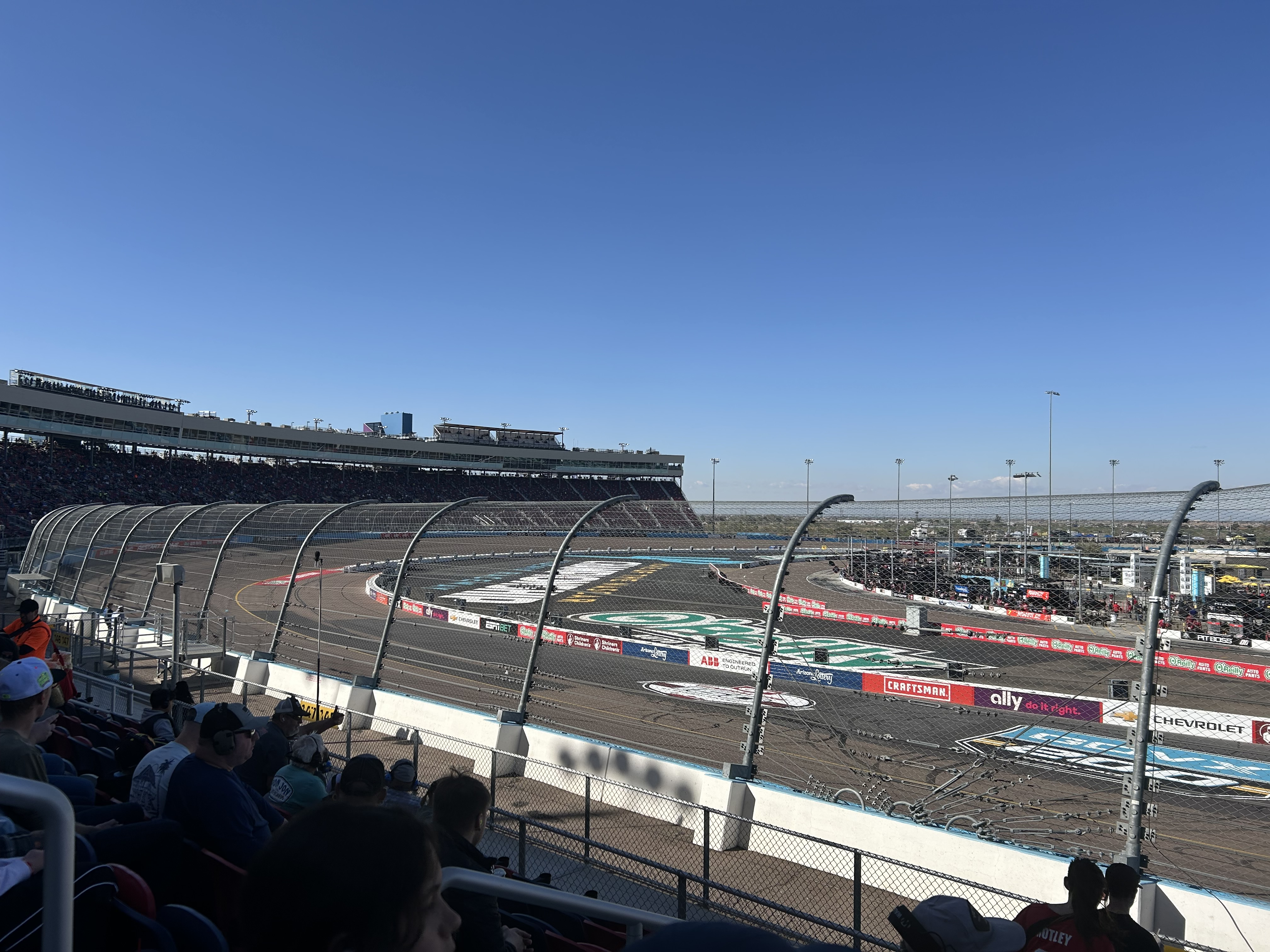
Phoenix Raceway, the circuit where the race was held.

Phoenix Raceway – also known as PIR – is a one-mile, low-banked tri-oval race track located in Avondale, Arizona. It is named after the nearby metropolitan area of Phoenix. The motorsport track opened in 1964 and currently hosts two NASCAR race weekends annually. PIR has also hosted the IndyCar Series, CART, USAC and the Rolex Sports Car Series. The raceway is currently owned and operated by International Speedway Corporation.

The raceway was originally constructed with a 2.5 mi (4.0 km) road course that ran both inside and outside of the main tri-oval. In 1991 the track was reconfigured with the current 1.51 mi (2.43 km) interior layout. PIR has an estimated grandstand seating capacity of around 67,000. Lights were installed around the track in 2004 following the addition of a second annual NASCAR race weekend.

Phoenix Raceway is home to two annual NASCAR race weekends, one of 13 facilities on the NASCAR schedule to host more than one race weekend a year. The track is both the first and last stop in the western United States, as well as the fourth and the last track on the schedule.

==== Entry list ====
- (R) denotes rookie driver.
- (i) denotes driver who is ineligible for series driver points.

#	Driver	Team	Make
00	Sheldon Creed	Haas Factory Team	Ford
1	Carson Kvapil (R)	JR Motorsports	Chevrolet
2	Jesse Love	Richard Childress Racing	Chevrolet
4	Parker Retzlaff	Alpha Prime Racing	Chevrolet
5	Kris Wright	Our Motorsports	Chevrolet
07	Nick Leitz	SS-Green Light Racing	Chevrolet
7	Justin Allgaier	JR Motorsports	Chevrolet
8	Sammy Smith	JR Motorsports	Chevrolet
10	Daniel Dye (R)	Kaulig Racing	Chevrolet
11	Josh Williams	Kaulig Racing	Chevrolet
14	Garrett Smithley	SS-Green Light Racing	Chevrolet
16	Christian Eckes (R)	Kaulig Racing	Chevrolet
17	Alex Bowman (i)	Hendrick Motorsports	Chevrolet
18	William Sawalich (R)	Joe Gibbs Racing	Toyota
19	Aric Almirola	Joe Gibbs Racing	Toyota
20	Brandon Jones	Joe Gibbs Racing	Toyota
21	Austin Hill	Richard Childress Racing	Chevrolet
25	Harrison Burton	AM Racing	Ford
26	Dean Thompson (R)	Sam Hunt Racing	Toyota
27	Jeb Burton	Jordan Anderson Racing	Chevrolet
28	Kyle Sieg	RSS Racing	Ford
31	Blaine Perkins	Jordan Anderson Racing	Chevrolet
35	Greg Van Alst	Joey Gase Motorsports	Chevrolet
39	Ryan Sieg	RSS Racing	Ford
41	Sam Mayer	Haas Factory Team	Ford
42	Anthony Alfredo	Young's Motorsports	Chevrolet
44	Brennan Poole	Alpha Prime Racing	Chevrolet
45	Mason Massey	Alpha Prime Racing	Chevrolet
48	Nick Sanchez (R)	Big Machine Racing	Chevrolet
51	Jeremy Clements	Jeremy Clements Racing	Chevrolet
53	Joey Gase	Joey Gase Motorsports	Chevrolet
54	Taylor Gray (R)	Joe Gibbs Racing	Toyota
70	Thomas Annunziata	Cope Family Racing	Chevrolet
71	Ryan Ellis	DGM Racing	Chevrolet
74	Dawson Cram	Mike Harmon Racing	Chevrolet
88	Connor Zilisch (R)	JR Motorsports	Chevrolet
91	Josh Bilicki	DGM Racing	Chevrolet
99	Matt DiBenedetto	Viking Motorsports	Chevrolet
Official entry list

== Practice ==
The first and only practice session was held on Saturday, March 8, at 9:35 PM MST, and would last for 55 minutes. Justin Allgaier, driving for JR Motorsports, would set the fastest time in the session, with a lap of 27.685, and a speed of 130.034 mph (209.269 km/h).

Pos.	#	Driver	Team	Make	Time	Speed
1	7	Justin Allgaier	JR Motorsports	Chevrolet	27.685	130.034
2	42	Anthony Alfredo	Young's Motorsports	Chevrolet	27.937	128.861
3	1	Carson Kvapil (R)	JR Motorsports	Chevrolet	27.940	128.848
Official practice results

== Qualifying ==
Qualifying was held on Saturday, March 8, at 10:40 AM MST. Since Phoenix Raceway is a mile oval, the qualifying procedure used was a single-car, one-lap system with one round. Drivers will be on track by themselves and will have one lap to post a qualifying time, and whoever sets the fastest time will win the pole.

Alex Bowman, driving for Hendrick Motorsports, would score the pole for the race, with a lap of 27.276, and a speed of 131.984 mph (212.408 km/h).

No drivers would fail to qualify.

=== Qualifying results ===
Pos.	#	Driver	Team	Make	Time	Speed
1	17	Alex Bowman (i)	Hendrick Motorsports	Chevrolet	27.276	131.984
2	00	Sheldon Creed	Haas Factory Team	Ford	27.359	131.584
3	8	Sammy Smith	JR Motorsports	Chevrolet	27.415	131.315
4	88	Connor Zilisch (R)	JR Motorsports	Chevrolet	27.455	131.124
5	2	Jesse Love	Richard Childress Racing	Chevrolet	27.517	130.828
6	18	William Sawalich (R)	Joe Gibbs Racing	Toyota	27.560	130.624
7	48	Nick Sanchez (R)	Big Machine Racing	Chevrolet	27.586	130.501
8	19	Aric Almirola	Joe Gibbs Racing	Toyota	27.592	130.473
9	54	Taylor Gray (R)	Joe Gibbs Racing	Toyota	27.604	130.416
10	21	Austin Hill	Richard Childress Racing	Chevrolet	27.639	130.251
11	27	Jeb Burton	Jordan Anderson Racing	Chevrolet	27.685	130.034
12	26	Dean Thompson (R)	Sam Hunt Racing	Toyota	27.693	129.997
13	41	Sam Mayer	Haas Factory Team	Ford	27.756	129.702
14	7	Justin Allgaier	JR Motorsports	Chevrolet	27.776	129.608
15	11	Josh Williams	Kaulig Racing	Chevrolet	27.838	129.320
16	20	Brandon Jones	Joe Gibbs Racing	Toyota	27.840	129.310
17	10	Daniel Dye (R)	Kaulig Racing	Chevrolet	27.878	129.134
18	31	Blaine Perkins	Jordan Anderson Racing	Chevrolet	27.893	129.065
19	51	Jeremy Clements	Jeremy Clements Racing	Chevrolet	27.901	129.028
20	16	Christian Eckes (R)	Kaulig Racing	Chevrolet	27.916	128.958
21	25	Harrison Burton	AM Racing	Ford	27.929	128.898
22	91	Josh Bilicki	DGM Racing	Chevrolet	27.940	128.848
23	44	Brennan Poole	Alpha Prime Racing	Chevrolet	28.012	128.516
24	1	Carson Kvapil (R)	JR Motorsports	Chevrolet	28.021	128.475
25	42	Anthony Alfredo	Young's Motorsports	Chevrolet	28.026	128.452
26	4	Parker Retzlaff	Alpha Prime Racing	Chevrolet	28.092	128.150
27	70	Thomas Annunziata	Cope Family Racing	Chevrolet	28.114	128.050
28	71	Ryan Ellis	DGM Racing	Chevrolet	28.187	127.718
29	07	Nick Leitz	SS-Green Light Racing	Chevrolet	28.197	127.673
30	39	Ryan Sieg	RSS Racing	Ford	28.199	127.664
31	99	Matt DiBenedetto	Viking Motorsports	Chevrolet	28.212	127.605
32	28	Kyle Sieg	RSS Racing	Ford	28.367	126.908
Qualified by owner's points
33	5	Kris Wright	Our Motorsports	Chevrolet	28.375	126.872
34	45	Mason Massey	Alpha Prime Racing	Chevrolet	28.880	124.654
35	74	Dawson Cram	Mike Harmon Racing	Chevrolet	29.000	124.138
36	14	Garrett Smithley	SS-Green Light Racing	Chevrolet	29.100	123.711
37	53	Joey Gase	Joey Gase Motorsports	Chevrolet	29.207	123.258
38	35	Greg Van Alst	Joey Gase Motorsports	Chevrolet	29.547	121.840
Official qualifying results
Official starting lineup

== Race results ==
Stage 1 Laps: 45

Pos.	#	Driver	Team	Make	Pts
1	17	Alex Bowman (i)	Hendrick Motorsports	Chevrolet	0
2	19	Aric Almirola	Joe Gibbs Racing	Toyota	9
3	7	Justin Allgaier	JR Motorsports	Chevrolet	8
4	88	Connor Zilisch (R)	JR Motorsports	Chevrolet	7
5	00	Sheldon Creed	Haas Factory Team	Ford	6
6	8	Sammy Smith	JR Motorsports	Chevrolet	5
7	48	Nick Sanchez (R)	Big Machine Racing	Chevrolet	4
8	20	Brandon Jones	Joe Gibbs Racing	Toyota	3
9	2	Jesse Love	Richard Childress Racing	Chevrolet	2
10	41	Sam Mayer	Haas Factory Team	Ford	1

Stage 2 Laps: 45

Pos.	#	Driver	Team	Make	Pts
1	7	Justin Allgaier	JR Motorsports	Chevrolet	10
2	19	Aric Almirola	Joe Gibbs Racing	Toyota	9
3	17	Alex Bowman (i)	Hendrick Motorsports	Chevrolet	0
4	20	Brandon Jones	Joe Gibbs Racing	Toyota	7
5	8	Sammy Smith	JR Motorsports	Chevrolet	6
6	41	Sam Mayer	Haas Factory Team	Ford	5
7	2	Jesse Love	Richard Childress Racing	Chevrolet	4
8	54	Taylor Gray (R)	Joe Gibbs Racing	Toyota	3
9	1	Carson Kvapil (R)	JR Motorsports	Chevrolet	2
10	39	Ryan Sieg	RSS Racing	Ford	1

Stage 3 Laps: 118

Fin	St	#	Driver	Team	Make	Laps	Led	Status	Pts
1	8	19	Aric Almirola	Joe Gibbs Racing	Toyota	208	25	Running	58
2	1	17	Alex Bowman (i)	Hendrick Motorsports	Chevrolet	208	50	Running	0
3	16	20	Brandon Jones	Joe Gibbs Racing	Toyota	208	0	Running	44
4	30	39	Ryan Sieg	RSS Racing	Ford	208	0	Running	34
5	14	7	Justin Allgaier	JR Motorsports	Chevrolet	208	130	Running	51
6	9	54	Taylor Gray (R)	Joe Gibbs Racing	Toyota	208	0	Running	34
7	13	41	Sam Mayer	Haas Factory Team	Ford	208	0	Running	36
8	20	16	Christian Eckes (R)	Kaulig Racing	Chevrolet	208	0	Running	29
9	5	2	Jesse Love	Richard Childress Racing	Chevrolet	208	0	Running	34
10	7	48	Nick Sanchez (R)	Big Machine Racing	Chevrolet	208	0	Running	31
11	26	4	Parker Retzlaff	Alpha Prime Racing	Chevrolet	208	0	Running	26
12	15	11	Josh Williams	Kaulig Racing	Chevrolet	208	0	Running	25
13	6	18	William Sawalich (R)	Joe Gibbs Racing	Toyota	208	0	Running	24
14	3	8	Sammy Smith	JR Motorsports	Chevrolet	208	0	Running	34
15	11	27	Jeb Burton	Jordan Anderson Racing	Chevrolet	208	0	Running	22
16	4	88	Connor Zilisch (R)	JR Motorsports	Chevrolet	208	2	Running	28
17	23	44	Brennan Poole	Alpha Prime Racing	Chevrolet	208	0	Running	20
18	32	28	Kyle Sieg	RSS Racing	Ford	208	0	Running	19
19	17	10	Daniel Dye (R)	Kaulig Racing	Chevrolet	208	0	Running	18
20	21	25	Harrison Burton	AM Racing	Ford	208	0	Running	17
21	19	51	Jeremy Clements	Jeremy Clements Racing	Chevrolet	208	0	Running	16
22	34	45	Mason Massey	Alpha Prime Racing	Chevrolet	207	0	Running	15
23	22	91	Josh Bilicki	DGM Racing	Chevrolet	206	0	Running	14
24	18	31	Blaine Perkins	Jordan Anderson Racing	Chevrolet	206	0	Running	13
25	33	5	Kris Wright	Our Motorsports	Chevrolet	206	0	Running	12
26	24	1	Carson Kvapil (R)	JR Motorsports	Chevrolet	206	1	Running	13
27	31	99	Matt DiBenedetto	Viking Motorsports	Chevrolet	205	0	Running	10
28	37	53	Joey Gase	Joey Gase Motorsports	Chevrolet	205	0	Running	9
29	36	14	Garrett Smithley	SS-Green Light Racing	Chevrolet	204	0	Running	8
30	29	07	Nick Leitz	SS-Green Light Racing	Chevrolet	204	0	Running	7
31	38	35	Greg Van Alst	Joey Gase Motorsports	Chevrolet	201	0	Running	6
32	25	42	Anthony Alfredo	Young's Motorsports	Chevrolet	193	0	Running	5
33	28	71	Ryan Ellis	DGM Racing	Chevrolet	186	0	Running	4
34	27	70	Thomas Annunziata	Cope Family Racing	Chevrolet	185	0	Running	3
35	35	74	Dawson Cram	Mike Harmon Racing	Chevrolet	144	0	Accident	2
36	2	00	Sheldon Creed	Haas Factory Team	Ford	64	0	Accident	7
37	10	21	Austin Hill	Richard Childress Racing	Chevrolet	61	0	Accident	1
38	12	26	Dean Thompson (R)	Sam Hunt Racing	Toyota	61	0	Accident	1
Official race results

== Standings after the race ==
Drivers' Championship standings

	Pos	Driver	Points
1	1	Jesse Love	143
3	2	Justin Allgaier	141 (–2)
1	3	Sam Mayer	130 (–13)
3	4	Austin Hill	123 (–20)
1	5	Sammy Smith	121 (–22)
3	6	Sheldon Creed	115 (–28)
1	7	Taylor Gray	109 (–34)
1	8	Jeb Burton	107 (–36)
	9	Christian Eckes	103 (–40)
3	10	Ryan Sieg	102 (–41)
16	11	Aric Almirola	97 (–46)
	12	William Sawalich	92 (–51)
Official driver's standings

Manufacturers' Championship standings

	Pos	Manufacturer	Points
	1	Chevrolet	155
1	2	Toyota	136 (–19)
1	3	Ford	129 (–26)

- Note: Only the first 12 positions are included for the driver standings.

Previous race: 2025 Focused Health 250 (COTA)	NASCAR Xfinity Series; 2025 season	Next race: 2025 The LiUNA!
