= Jeremy Clements Racing =

NASCAR team

- Owner(s): Jeremy Clements; Tony Clements
- Base: Kannapolis, North Carolina
- Series: NASCAR O'Reilly Auto Parts Series
- Race drivers: 51. Jeremy Clements
- Manufacturer: Chevrolet
- Opened: 2008

Career
- Debut: 2008 Missouri-Illinois Dodge Dealers 250 (Gateway)
- Latest race: 2026 O'Reilly Auto Parts 300 (Homestead)
- Races competed: 535
- Drivers' Championships: 0
- Race victories: 2
- Pole positions: 0

Jeremy Clements Racing, formerly known as Jeremy Clements Motorsports, is an American professional stock car racing team. The team currently fields the No. 51 Chevrolet Camaro SS full-time for Jeremy Clements in the NASCAR O'Reilly Auto Parts Series. Based in Spartanburg, South Carolina until 2026, the team was founded in 2010, and is owned by driver Jeremy Clements and his father Tony. The team has a technical alliance with Haas Factory Team.

== History ==
=== Car No. 50 history ===
In 2008, Jeremy Clements attempted the Dollar General 300 but failed to qualify. He did, however, qualify for the next race, the Missouri-Illinois Dodge Dealers 250, and debuted for Jeremy Clements Motorsports in the No. 50 car. He finished 22nd. 2009 would see them increase in made races from the previous years. In six starts, Clements would improve on the team's best career finish, from 22nd to sixteenth at Gateway, where the team had debuted the year earlier. 2010 would see the Clements family step away from fielding an independent team to collaborate with JD Motorsports. Clements would miss six of his twenty-two attempts in the No. 04, but he would also get his first top-ten, again at Gateway.

==== Car No. 50 results ====
Year	Driver	No.	Make	1	2	3	4	5	6	7	8	9	10	11	12	13	14	15	16	17	18	19	20	21	22	23	24	25	26	27	28	29	30	31	32	33	34	35	Owners	Pts
2008	Jeremy Clements	50	Chevy	DAY	CAL	LVS	ATL	BRI	NSH	TEX	PHO	MXC	TAL	RCH	DAR	CLT	DOV	NSH	KEN	MLW	NHA	DAY	CHI; DNQ	GTY; 22	IRP	CGV	GLN	MCH; DNQ	BRI	CAL	RCH	DOV	KAN	CLT	MEM	TEX	PHO	HOM; 30	N/A	170
2009	Jeremy Clements	50	Chevy	DAY	CAL	LVS	BRI	TEX	NSH; 39	PHO	TAL	RCH	DAR	CLT; 27	DOV	NSH	KEN	MLW	NHA	DAY	CHI; 35	GTY; 16	IRP	IOW	GLN	MCH; 25	BRI	CGV	ATL; 36	RCH	DOV	KAN	CAL	CLT	MEM	TEX	PHO	HOM	N/A	N/A

=== Car No. 51 history ===
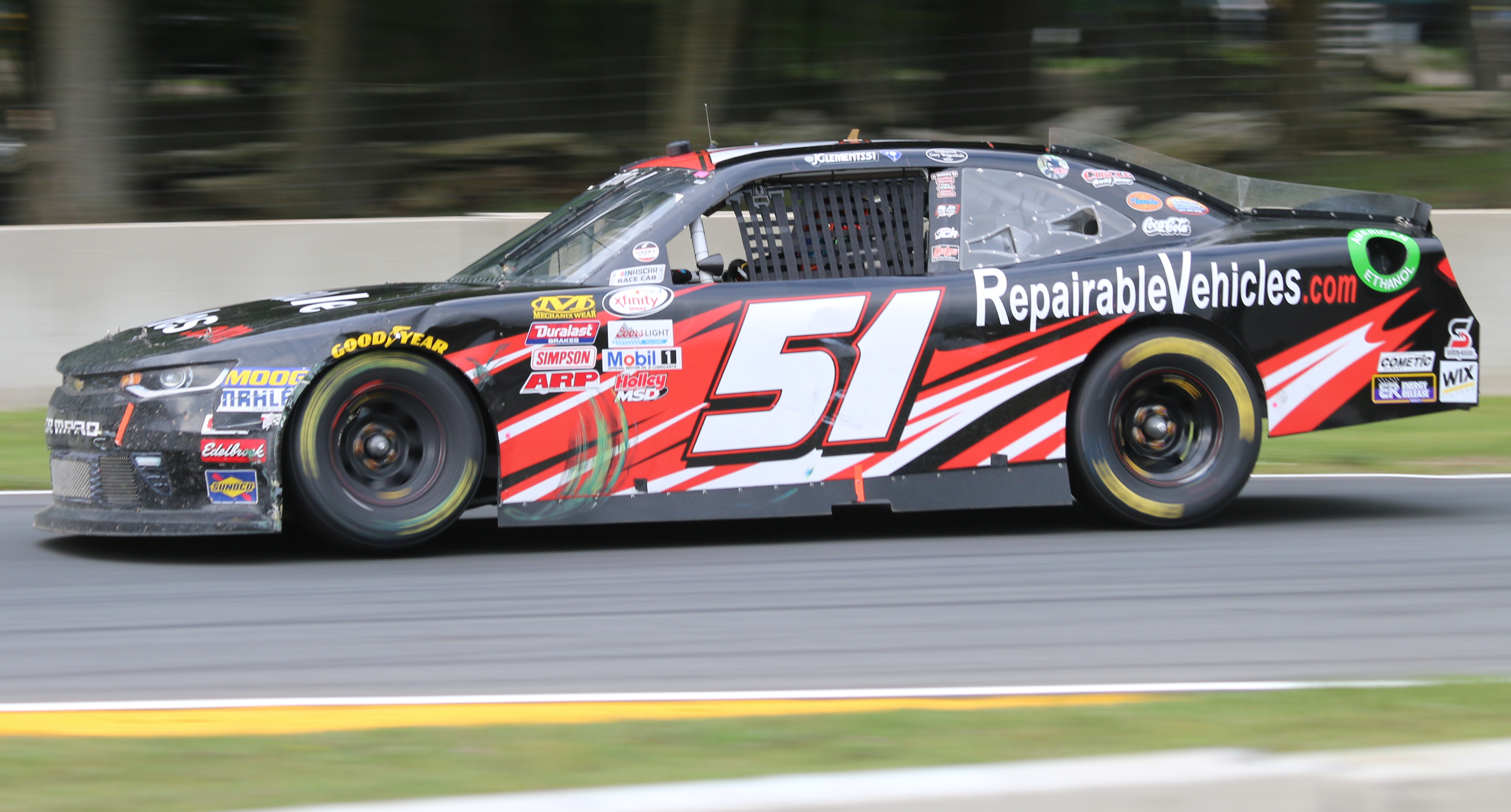
Jeremy Clements in the No. 51 during the 2017 Johnsonville 180.

In 2011, the team would see Clements go back to fielding his team. He would attempt the full schedule for the first time, in a new No. 51. He would succeed, attaining three top-fifteens on the way to a top-fifteen points finish.

In 2012, for both the Virginia 529 College Savings 250, and the Lilly Diabetes 250, Clements fielded the No. 4 entry for Jeremy Clements Racing, the successor to Jeremy Clements Motorsports, in place of the regular 51, as Richard Childress Racing used it for Ty Dillon. Dillon finished third and seventh, respectively. Clements would improve over last season with two top-tens and five top-fifteens, finishing 14th in the points standings. In 2013, Jeremy Clements missed both the Dollar General 200 and the Sam's Town 300. Ryan Sieg filled in the No. 51 for both races, with the events being his first two Xfinity Series starts. He finished 21st and eighteenth, respectively. Clements would continue to perform, with two top-tens and three to-fifteens. Despite missing two races and having fewer stellar finishes, he would only fall to 16th in the standings. 2014-15 would see Clements accumulate three top-tens, almost finishing in the top-five at Elkhart Lake in 2014. His best points finish during this stretch tied the team's best of fourteenth. By this point, the No. 51 had become known for their consistency in both race and season points finishes.

In the inaugural season of the Xfinity Series Chase (2016), Clements finished fifteenth in points, just three positions outside of the lowest spot in the Chase, twelfth. This season would also see Clements Racing finish in the top-five for the first time, a fourth at the spring Talladega race. They would also finish top-ten two additional times On August 27, 2017, Clements won the Johnsonville 180 at Road America, after a collision with Matt Tifft while coming to the white flag. This victory was the first victory for Clements, JCR, and the 51 team, and locked the 51 into the first round of the 2017 Xfinity Series Chase, the Round of 12. However, Clements would miss the round of 8 and finish last in the Chase. Despite this relative disappointment, the win and subsequent points finish was the breakout moment that JCR had been looking for after only finishing top-tenonce up until that point in the season and never finishing higher than 14th in the points. 2018 would be a return to business as usual, as Jeremy Clements would have two more top-ten finishes en route to another top-fifteen points finish. Their best finish was an eighth at Richmond.

Before the 2019 NASCAR Xfinity Series season, JCR purchased chassis from the shuttered Chip Ganassi Racing Xfinity Series program, intending to run top-fifteen to top-ten consistently with the new cars. This prediction would prove accurate, as the No. 51 team would see a marked increase in production. With one top-five and four top-tens, including a sixth at the fall Kansas race, the highs were certainly higher. However, the team would again finish in fourteenth for the final points standings.

During the 2020 season, the team was fined $10,000 for an undisclosed violation of NASCAR's COVID-19 protocols; the penalty was upheld after an appeal by the team. On September 23, 2020, JCR announced it has parted ways with longtime sponsor RepairableVehicles.com, ending a partnership that lasted for 10 years. The team will look for new sponsors for the remainder of the season and 2021. None of this seemed to slow down the JCR team, however, as they would hold strong with one top-five and five top-tens. His season-best finish of third at Pocono was the best finish for the No. 51 since his win three years earlier, but they would just miss out on the Playoffs by finishing thirteenth in the final points standings. 2021 would see Clements get off to one of the hottest starts in his career, as through the first eight races he would accumulate three top-10's while finishing an astonishing 99.8% of the scheduled laps. This hot streak would help solve his previous sponsorship woes, as First Pacific Funding would sign on to sponsor him for the rest of the season.

During the 2022 season, Clements scored his second career win at the Daytona night race. However, NASCAR issued the team an L2 penalty four days later after the post-race inspection discovered an illegally modified intake manifold. Clements kept the win, but was declared ineligible for the playoffs. In addition, crew chief Mark Setzer was fined US$60,000 and the team was docked 75 owner and driver points, plus ten playoff points should the team qualify for the postseason. Clements's appeal was heard on September 13; panel members Tom DeLoach, Richard Gore and Dixon Johnston found in Clements's favor, rescinding the penalty and revoking the punishments. As a result, he regained his eligibility for the 2022 playoffs. On October 18, Setzer was suspended for one race and fined US$25,000 for an L1 Penalty under Section 14.4.B.E, which deals with the modification of a composite body part following the Las Vegas race. In addition, the No. 51 has been docked forty driver and owner points.

2023 was a disappointing season for Clements. He recorded seven top-fifteens, with his best showings being two fourteenth place finishes. He failed to record a single top-ten finish.

Clements' 2024 season would follow a similar trend to the previous season. He scored just one top-ten finish, a sixth-place finish at Atlanta.

Clements began the 2025 season with a ninth-place finish at Daytona. Clements was awarded an extra point because he scored the Xfinity Fastest Lap in the race. At Circuit of the Americas, Clements made his 500th Xfinity Series start, becoming the fourth driver to do so. He ended the season with four top-ten finishes

==== Car No. 51 results ====
Year	Driver	No.	Make	1	2	3	4	5	6	7	8	9	10	11	12	13	14	15	16	17	18	19	20	21	22	23	24	25	26	27	28	29	30	31	32	33	34	Owners	Pts
2011	Jeremy Clements	51	Chevy	DAY; 16	PHO; 22	LVS; 27	BRI; 16	CAL; 35	TEX; 21	TAL; 24	NSH; 23	RCH; 23	DAR; 26	DOV; 24	IOW; 14	CLT; 26	CHI; 29	MCH; 26	ROA; 32	DAY; 32	KEN; 31	NHA; 19	NSH; 21	IRP; 18	IOW; 17	GLN; 24	CGV; 39	BRI; 32	ATL; 14	RCH; 14	CHI; 21	DOV; 18	KAN; 23	CLT; 29	TEX; 26	PHO; 24	HOM; 18	22nd	696
2012	Jeremy Clements	51	Chevy	DAY; 25	PHO; 22	LVS; 21	BRI; 20	CAL; 20	TEX; 29	RCH; 33	TAL; 29	DAR; 33	IOW; 23	CLT; 18	DOV; 10	MCH; 31	ROA; 25	KEN; 21	DAY; 11	NHA; 17	CHI; 22		IOW; 21	GLN; 19	CGV; 25	BRI; 33	ATL; 15		CHI; 30	KEN; 15	DOV; 27	CLT; 19	KAN; 35	TEX; 16	PHO; 33	HOM; 22		21st	725
2012	Ty Dillon^{1}	51	Chevy																			IND; 3						RCH; 7										21st	725
2013	Jeremy Clements	51	Chevy	DAY; 33			BRI; 33	CAL; 21	TEX; 35	RCH; 37	TAL; 9	DAR; 20	CLT; 22	DOV; 19	IOW; 17	MCH; 13	ROA; 23	KEN; 25	DAY; 22	NHA; 23	CHI; 25	IND; 35	IOW; 21	GLN; 20	MOH; 10	BRI; 22	ATL; 23	RCH; 26	CHI; 24	KEN; 20	DOV; 20	KAN; 36	CLT; 20	TEX; 22	PHO; 26	HOM; 30		21st	687
2013	Ryan Sieg	51	Chevy		PHO; 21	LVS; 18																																21st	687
2014	Jeremy Clements	51	Chevy	DAY; 29	PHO; 21	LVS; 32	BRI; 18	CAL; 36	TEX; 18	DAR; 31	RCH; 22	TAL; 23	IOW; 22	CLT; 23	DOV; 20	MCH; 20	ROA; 6	KEN; 30	DAY; 8	NHA; 20	CHI; 13	IND; 26	IOW; 25	GLN; 16	MOH; 22	BRI; 23	ATL; 22	RCH; 21	CHI; 33	KEN; 21	DOV; 18	KAN; 17	CLT; 22	TEX; 21	PHO; 11	HOM; 13		21st	757
2015	Jeremy Clements	51	Chevy	DAY; 14	ATL; 21	LVS; 22	PHO; 16	CAL; 24	TEX; 22	BRI; 13	RCH; 14	TAL; 17	IOW; 15	CLT; 13	DOV; 10	MCH; 31	CHI; 19	DAY; 28	KEN; 26	NHA; 19	IND; 15	IOW; 21	GLN; 11	MOH; 17	BRI; 14	ROA; 28	DAR; 20	RCH; 34	CHI; 20	KEN; 19	DOV; 21	CLT; 20	KAN; 19	TEX; 17	PHO; 30	HOM; 22		20th	801
2016	Jeremy Clements	51	Chevy	DAY; 15	ATL; 17	LVS; 20	PHO; 28	CAL; 21	TEX; 24	BRI; 33	RCH; 22	TAL; 4	DOV; 22	CLT; 20	POC; 31	MCH; 21	IOW; 16	DAY; 16	KEN; 16	NHA; 13	IND; 17	IOW; 17	GLN; 25	MOH; 34	BRI; 6	ROA; 25	DAR; 8	RCH; 17	CHI; 16	KEN; 12	DOV; 22	CLT; 22	KAN; 28	TEX; 18	PHO; 31	HOM; 24		20th	693
2017	Jeremy Clements	51	Chevy	DAY; 35	ATL; 37	LVS; 26	PHO; 19	CAL; 22	TEX; 21	BRI; 17	RCH; 15	TAL; 27	CLT; 17	DOV; 23	POC; 17	MCH; 23	IOW; 7	DAY; 15	KEN; 22	NHA; 21	IND; 31	IOW; 28	GLN; 35	MOH; 37	BRI; 18	ROA; 1	DAR; 21	RCH; 16	CHI; 20	KEN; 22	DOV; 22	CLT; 20	KAN; 25	TEX; 22	PHO; 23	HOM; 23		23rd	515
2018	Jeremy Clements	51	Chevy	DAY; 16	ATL; 27	LVS; 22	PHO; 20	CAL; 15	TEX; 16	BRI; 40	RCH; 8	TAL; 35	DOV; 18	CLT; 35	POC; 15	MCH; 15	IOW; 20	CHI; 17	DAY; 34	KEN; 18	NHA; 18	IOW; 20	GLN; 14	MOH; 17	BRI; 13	ROA; 13	DAR; 16	IND; 14	LVS; 13	RCH; 16	CLT; 18	DOV; 20	KAN; 10	TEX; 14	PHO; 17	HOM; 19		18th	619
2019	Jeremy Clements	51	Chevy	DAY; 36	ATL; 18	LVS; 15	PHO; 13	CAL; 14	TEX; 26	BRI; 13	RCH; 35	TAL; 27	DOV; 18	CLT; 13	POC; 16	MCH; 15	IOW; 12	CHI; 13	DAY; 9	KEN; 13	NHA; 15	IOW; 30	GLN; 11	MOH; 11	BRI; 4	ROA; 8	DAR; 12	IND; 11	LVS; 20	RCH; 16	CLT; 11	DOV; 36	KAN; 6	TEX; 28	PHO; 18	HOM; 16		16th	699
2020	Jeremy Clements	51	Chevy	DAY; 28	LVS; 31	CAL; 9	PHO; 36	DAR; 12	CLT; 32	BRI; 8	ATL; 13	HOM; 12	HOM; 27	TAL; 24	POC; 3	IND; 13	KEN; 12	KEN; 11	TEX; 11	KAN; 12	ROA; 29	DAY; 6	DOV; 13	DOV; 19	DAY; 20	DAR; 32	RCH; 17	RCH; 17	BRI; 11	LVS; 13	TAL; 20	CLT; 16	KAN; 15	TEX; 27	MAR; 15	PHO; 10		16th	666
2021	Jeremy Clements	51	Chevy	DAY; 22	DAY; 10	HOM; 9	LVS; 17	PHO; 10	ATL; 12	MAR; 14	TAL; 14	DAR; 6	DOV; 12	COA; 23	CLT; 10	MOH; 33	TEX; 14	NSH; 11	POC; 13	ROA; 28	ATL; 8	NHA; 15	GLN; 16	IND; 14	MCH; 11	DAY; 24	DAR; 8	RCH; 26	BRI; 13	LVS; 39	TAL; 24	CLT; 12	TEX; 29	KAN; 17	MAR; 9	PHO; 18		15th	748
2022	Jeremy Clements	51	Chevy	DAY; 37	CAL; 17	LVS; 11	PHO; 18	ATL; 37	COA; 24	RCH; 20	MAR; 10	TAL; 23	DOV; 29	DAR; 29	TEX; 16	CLT; 22	PIR; 34	NSH; 22	ROA; 9	ATL; 17	NHA; 4	POC; 32	IND; 19	MCH; 31	GLN; 10	DAY; 1	DAR; 21	KAN; 21	BRI; 16	TEX; 36	TAL; 20	CLT; 14	LVS; 15	HOM; 26	MAR; 17	PHO; 27		12th	2069
2023	Jeremy Clements	51	Chevy	DAY; 17	CAL; 18	LVS; 25	PHO; 20	ATL; 15	COA; 14	RCH; 36	MAR; 32	TAL; 19	DOV; 19	DAR; 14	CLT; 19	PIR; 22	SON; 17	NSH; 22	CSC; 20	ATL; 15	NHA; 15	POC; 15	ROA; 27	MCH; 26	IRC; 19	GLN; 37	DAY; 26	DAR; 21	KAN; 15	BRI; 24	TEX; 18	ROV; 23	LVS; 30	HOM; 21	MAR; 17	PHO; 20		21st	533
2024	Jeremy Clements	51	Chevy	DAY; 29	ATL; 6	LVS; 25	PHO; 15	COA; 19	RCH; 24	MAR; 22	TEX; 16	TAL; 35	DOV; 14	DAR; 37	CLT; 13	PIR; 30	SON; 23	IOW; 21	NHA; 21	NSH; 22	CSC; 37	POC; 30	IND; 30	MCH; 15	DAY; 27	DAR; 31	ATL; 29	GLN; 18	BRI; 12	KAN; 27	TAL; 36	ROV; 20	LVS; 18	HOM; 16	MAR; 27	PHO; 20		25th	477
2025	Jeremy Clements	51	Chevy	DAY; 9	ATL; 11	COA; 28	PHO; 21	LVS; 24	HOM; 26	MAR; 14	DAR; 21	BRI; 20	CAR; 10	TAL; 26	TEX; 31	CLT; 16	NSH; 18	MXC; 36	POC; 12	ATL; 10	CSC; 31	SON; 30	DOV; 26	IND; 12	IOW; 22	GLN; 15	DAY; 36	PIR; 17	GTW; 15	BRI; 9	KAN; 32	ROV; 27	LVS; 36	TAL; 37	MAR; 34	PHO; 33		23rd	501
2026	Jeremy Clements	51	Chevy	DAY; 32	ATL; 29	COA; 32	PHO; 11	LVS; 24	DAR; 19	MAR; 37	ROC; 25	BRI; 15	KAN; 15	TAL; 5	TEX; 8	GLN; 33	DOV; 15	CLT; 30	NSH; 18	POC; 16	COR; 15	SON; 20	CHI; 35	ATL; 10	IND; 37	IOW; 30	DAY; 33	DAR; 9	GTW; 31	BRI; 14	LVS; 7	CLT; 20	PHO; 12	TAL; 18	MAR; 29	HOM		21st	570

- ^{1} – Was fielded by Richard Childress Racing but used the No. 51 owners points.
