= 2025 BetMGM 300 =

12th race of the 2025 NASCAR Xfinity Series

Race details
- Race 12 of 33 in the 2025 NASCAR Xfinity Series
- Date: May 24, 2025
- Location: Charlotte Motor Speedway in Concord, North Carolina
- Course: Permanent racing facility
- Course length: 1.5 miles (2.4 km)
- Distance: 205 laps, 307 mi (494 km)
- Scheduled distance: 200 laps, 300 mi (480 km)
- Average speed: 110.248 mph (177.427 km/h)

Pole position
Driver	Taylor Gray	Joe Gibbs Racing
- Time: 30.598

Most laps led
Driver	Justin Allgaier	JR Motorsports
- Laps: 103

Winner
No. 17	William Byron	Hendrick Motorsports

Television in the United States
- Network: The CW
- Announcers: Adam Alexander, Jamie McMurray, and Parker Kligerman

Radio in the United States
- Radio: PRN

The 2025 BetMGM 300 was the 13th stock car race of the 2025 NASCAR Xfinity Series, and the 44th iteration of the event. The race was held on Saturday, May 24, 2025, in Concord, North Carolina at Charlotte Motor Speedway, a 1.5 miles (2.4 km) permanent asphalt tri-oval shaped intermediate speedway. The race was originally scheduled to be contested over 200 laps, but was increased to 205 due to an overtime finish.

In a wreck-filled race that occurred in the final stage, William Byron, driving for Hendrick Motorsports, would survive numerous late-race restarts and took advantage of newer tires, making a late race pass on Justin Allgaier with two laps to go to earn his fifth career NASCAR Xfinity Series win, and his first of the season. Byron dominated the early stages of the race, winning both stages and leading 71 laps, while Allgaier dominated the final portion, leading a race-high 103 laps. To fill out the podium, Connor Zilisch, driving for JR Motorsports, and Nick Sanchez, driving for Big Machine Racing, would finish 2nd and 3rd, respectively.

Sammy Smith, who originally finished in 5th, was disqualified after post-race inspection after failing to meet minimum weight requirements and was credited with a 38th place finish.

== Report ==
=== Background ===
Charlotte Motor Speedway, the track where the race was held.

The race will be held at Charlotte Motor Speedway, located in Concord, North Carolina. The speedway complex includes a 1.5-mile (2.4 km) quad-oval track that was utilized for the race, as well as a dragstrip and a dirt track. The speedway was built in 1959 by Bruton Smith and is considered the home track for NASCAR with many race teams based in the Charlotte metropolitan area. The track is owned and operated by Speedway Motorsports Inc. (SMI) with Marcus G. Smith serving as track president.

==== Entry list ====
- (R) denotes rookie driver.
- (i) denotes driver who is ineligible for series driver points.

#	Driver	Team	Make
00	Sheldon Creed	Haas Factory Team	Ford
1	Carson Kvapil (R)	JR Motorsports	Chevrolet
2	Jesse Love	Richard Childress Racing	Chevrolet
3	Austin Dillon (i)	Richard Childress Racing	Chevrolet
4	Parker Retzlaff	Alpha Prime Racing	Chevrolet
5	Kris Wright	Our Motorsports	Chevrolet
07	Nick Leitz	SS-Green Light Racing	Chevrolet
7	Justin Allgaier	JR Motorsports	Chevrolet
8	Sammy Smith	JR Motorsports	Chevrolet
10	Daniel Dye (R)	Kaulig Racing	Chevrolet
11	Josh Williams	Kaulig Racing	Chevrolet
14	Garrett Smithley	SS-Green Light Racing	Chevrolet
16	Christian Eckes (R)	Kaulig Racing	Chevrolet
17	William Byron (i)	Hendrick Motorsports	Chevrolet
18	William Sawalich (R)	Joe Gibbs Racing	Toyota
19	Chase Briscoe (i)	Joe Gibbs Racing	Toyota
20	Brandon Jones	Joe Gibbs Racing	Toyota
21	Austin Hill	Richard Childress Racing	Chevrolet
25	Harrison Burton	AM Racing	Ford
26	Dean Thompson (R)	Sam Hunt Racing	Toyota
27	Jeb Burton	Jordan Anderson Racing	Chevrolet
28	Kyle Sieg	RSS Racing	Ford
31	Blaine Perkins	Jordan Anderson Racing	Chevrolet
32	Katherine Legge (i)	Jordan Anderson Racing	Chevrolet
35	Carson Ware	Joey Gase Motorsports	Ford
39	Ryan Sieg	RSS Racing	Ford
41	Sam Mayer	Haas Factory Team	Ford
42	Anthony Alfredo	Young's Motorsports	Chevrolet
44	Brennan Poole	Alpha Prime Racing	Chevrolet
45	Brad Perez	Alpha Prime Racing	Chevrolet
48	Nick Sanchez (R)	Big Machine Racing	Chevrolet
51	Jeremy Clements	Jeremy Clements Racing	Chevrolet
53	J. J. Yeley	Joey Gase Motorsports	Chevrolet
54	Taylor Gray (R)	Joe Gibbs Racing	Toyota
70	Leland Honeyman	Cope Family Racing	Chevrolet
71	Ryan Ellis	DGM Racing	Chevrolet
74	Dawson Cram	Mike Harmon Racing	Chevrolet
88	Connor Zilisch (R)	JR Motorsports	Chevrolet
91	C. J. McLaughlin	DGM Racing	Chevrolet
99	Matt DiBenedetto	Viking Motorsports	Chevrolet
Official entry list

== Practice ==
For practice, drivers were separated into two groups, A and B. Both sessions were 25 minutes long, and was held on Saturday, May 24, at 11:05 AM EST. Justin Allgaier, driving for JR Motorsports, would set the fastest time between both sessions, with a lap of 30.462, and a speed of 177.270 mph (285.288 km/h).

Pos.	#	Driver	Team	Make	Time	Speed
1	7	Justin Allgaier	JR Motorsports	Chevrolet	30.462	177.270
2	00	Sheldon Creed	Haas Factory Team	Ford	30.724	175.758
3	16	Christian Eckes (R)	Kaulig Racing	Chevrolet	30.883	174.853
Full practice results

== Qualifying ==
Qualifying was held on Saturday, May 24, at 12:10 PM EST. Since Charlotte Motor Speedway is an intermediate racetrack, the qualifying procedure used is a single-car, one-lap system with one round. Drivers will be on track by themselves and will have one lap to post a qualifying time, and whoever sets the fastest time will win the pole.

Taylor Gray, driving for Joe Gibbs Racing, would score the pole for the race, with a lap of 30.598, and a speed of 176.482 mph (284.020 km/h).

Two drivers failed to qualify: Dawson Cram and Carson Ware.

=== Qualifying results ===
Pos.	#	Driver	Team	Make	Time	Speed
1	54	Taylor Gray (R)	Joe Gibbs Racing	Toyota	30.598	176.482
2	88	Connor Zilisch (R)	JR Motorsports	Chevrolet	30.627	176.315
3	21	Austin Hill	Richard Childress Racing	Chevrolet	30.648	176.194
4	17	William Byron (i)	Hendrick Motorsports	Chevrolet	30.652	176.171
5	20	Brandon Jones	Joe Gibbs Racing	Toyota	30.750	175.610
6	18	William Sawalich (R)	Joe Gibbs Racing	Toyota	30.825	175.182
7	39	Ryan Sieg	RSS Racing	Ford	30.852	175.029
8	00	Sheldon Creed	Haas Factory Team	Ford	30.852	175.029
9	19	Chase Briscoe (i)	Joe Gibbs Racing	Toyota	30.881	174.865
10	7	Justin Allgaier	JR Motorsports	Chevrolet	30.882	174.859
11	41	Sam Mayer	Haas Factory Team	Ford	30.919	174.650
12	1	Carson Kvapil (R)	JR Motorsports	Chevrolet	30.920	174.644
13	8	Sammy Smith	JR Motorsports	Chevrolet	30.951	174.469
14	27	Jeb Burton	Jordan Anderson Racing	Chevrolet	30.954	174.452
15	16	Christian Eckes (R)	Kaulig Racing	Chevrolet	30.970	174.362
16	99	Matt DiBenedetto	Viking Motorsports	Chevrolet	30.980	174.306
17	42	Anthony Alfredo	Young's Motorsports	Chevrolet	30.983	174.289
18	48	Nick Sanchez (R)	Big Machine Racing	Chevrolet	31.040	173.969
19	2	Jesse Love	Richard Childress Racing	Chevrolet	31.118	173.533
20	3	Austin Dillon (i)	Richard Childress Racing	Chevrolet	31.182	173.177
21	31	Blaine Perkins	Jordan Anderson Racing	Chevrolet	31.229	172.916
22	51	Jeremy Clements	Jeremy Clements Racing	Chevrolet	31.248	172.811
23	26	Dean Thompson (R)	Sam Hunt Racing	Toyota	31.301	172.518
24	10	Daniel Dye (R)	Kaulig Racing	Chevrolet	31.384	172.062
25	25	Harrison Burton	AM Racing	Ford	31.426	171.832
26	44	Brennan Poole	Alpha Prime Racing	Chevrolet	31.472	171.581
27	11	Josh Williams	Kaulig Racing	Chevrolet	31.558	171.114
28	28	Kyle Sieg	RSS Racing	Ford	31.594	170.919
29	53	J. J. Yeley	Joey Gase Motorsports	Chevrolet	31.623	170.762
30	71	Ryan Ellis	DGM Racing	Chevrolet	31.668	170.519
31	70	Leland Honeyman	Cope Family Racing	Chevrolet	31.668	170.519
32	32	Katherine Legge (i)	Jordan Anderson Racing	Chevrolet	31.708	170.304
Qualified by owner's points
33	5	Kris Wright	Our Motorsports	Chevrolet	31.755	170.052
34	4	Parker Retzlaff	Alpha Prime Racing	Chevrolet	31.850	169.545
35	14	Garrett Smithley	SS-Green Light Racing	Chevrolet	31.952	169.004
36	45	Brad Perez	Alpha Prime Racing	Chevrolet	31.953	168.998
37	07	Nick Leitz	SS-Green Light Racing	Chevrolet	32.567	165.812
38	91	C. J. McLaughlin	DGM Racing	Chevrolet	33.139	162.950
Failed to qualify
39	74	Dawson Cram	Mike Harmon Racing	Chevrolet	31.788	169.875
40	35	Carson Ware	Joey Gase Motorsports	Ford	–	–
Official qualifying results
Official starting lineup

== Race results ==
Stage 1 Laps: 45

Pos.	#	Driver	Team	Make	Pts
1	17	William Byron (i)	Hendrick Motorsports	Chevrolet	0
2	88	Connor Zilisch (R)	JR Motorsports	Chevrolet	9
3	7	Justin Allgaier	JR Motorsports	Chevrolet	8
4	41	Sam Mayer	Haas Factory Team	Ford	7
5	27	Jeb Burton	Jordan Anderson Racing	Chevrolet	6
6	39	Ryan Sieg	RSS Racing	Ford	5
7	54	Taylor Gray (R)	Joe Gibbs Racing	Toyota	4
8	48	Nick Sanchez (R)	Big Machine Racing	Chevrolet	3
9	20	Brandon Jones	Joe Gibbs Racing	Toyota	2
10	2	Jesse Love	Richard Childress Racing	Chevrolet	1

Stage 2 Laps: 45

Pos.	#	Driver	Team	Make	Pts
1	17	William Byron (i)	Hendrick Motorsports	Chevrolet	0
2	7	Justin Allgaier	JR Motorsports	Chevrolet	9
3	88	Connor Zilisch (R)	JR Motorsports	Chevrolet	8
4	54	Taylor Gray (R)	Joe Gibbs Racing	Toyota	7
5	20	Brandon Jones	Joe Gibbs Racing	Toyota	6
6	41	Sam Mayer	Haas Factory Team	Ford	5
7	39	Ryan Sieg	RSS Racing	Ford	4
8	2	Jesse Love	Richard Childress Racing	Chevrolet	3
9	00	Sheldon Creed	Haas Factory Team	Ford	2
10	1	Carson Kvapil (R)	JR Motorsports	Chevrolet	1

Stage 3 Laps: 115

Fin	St	#	Driver	Team	Make	Laps	Led	Status	Pts
1	4	17	William Byron (i)	Hendrick Motorsports	Chevrolet	205	71	Running	0
2	2	88	Connor Zilisch (R)	JR Motorsports	Chevrolet	205	3	Running	52
3	18	48	Nick Sanchez (R)	Big Machine Racing	Chevrolet	205	0	Running	37
4	10	7	Justin Allgaier	JR Motorsports	Chevrolet	205	103	Running	51
5	23	26	Dean Thompson (R)	Sam Hunt Racing	Toyota	205	0	Running	32
6	27	11	Josh Williams	Kaulig Racing	Chevrolet	205	0	Running	31
7	3	21	Austin Hill	Richard Childress Racing	Chevrolet	205	0	Running	30
8	30	71	Ryan Ellis	DGM Racing	Chevrolet	205	0	Running	29
9	15	16	Christian Eckes (R)	Kaulig Racing	Chevrolet	205	0	Running	28
10	8	00	Sheldon Creed	Haas Factory Team	Ford	205	0	Running	29
11	11	41	Sam Mayer	Haas Factory Team	Ford	205	0	Running	38
12	19	2	Jesse Love	Richard Childress Racing	Chevrolet	205	0	Running	29
13	20	3	Austin Dillon (i)	Richard Childress Racing	Chevrolet	205	0	Running	0
14	7	39	Ryan Sieg	RSS Racing	Ford	205	0	Running	32
15	6	18	William Sawalich (R)	Joe Gibbs Racing	Toyota	205	0	Running	22
16	22	51	Jeremy Clements	Jeremy Clements Racing	Chevrolet	205	0	Running	21
17	12	1	Carson Kvapil (R)	JR Motorsports	Chevrolet	205	0	Running	21
18	33	5	Kris Wright	Our Motorsports	Chevrolet	205	0	Running	19
19	5	20	Brandon Jones	Joe Gibbs Racing	Toyota	205	5	Running	26
20	14	27	Jeb Burton	Jordan Anderson Racing	Chevrolet	205	0	Running	23
21	25	25	Harrison Burton	AM Racing	Ford	205	0	Running	16
22	26	44	Brennan Poole	Alpha Prime Racing	Chevrolet	204	0	Accident	15
23	9	19	Chase Briscoe (i)	Joe Gibbs Racing	Toyota	204	0	Running	0
24	21	31	Blaine Perkins	Jordan Anderson Racing	Chevrolet	204	0	Running	13
25	17	42	Anthony Alfredo	Young's Motorsports	Chevrolet	203	0	Running	12
26	35	14	Garrett Smithley	SS-Green Light Racing	Chevrolet	203	0	Running	11
27	37	07	Nick Leitz	SS-Green Light Racing	Chevrolet	203	0	Running	10
28	29	53	J. J. Yeley	Joey Gase Motorsports	Chevrolet	203	0	Running	9
29	38	91	C. J. McLaughlin	DGM Racing	Chevrolet	203	0	Running	8
30	1	54	Taylor Gray (R)	Joe Gibbs Racing	Toyota	202	23	Running	18
31	24	10	Daniel Dye (R)	Kaulig Racing	Chevrolet	199	0	Accident	6
32	31	70	Leland Honeyman	Cope Family Racing	Chevrolet	194	0	Accident	5
33	28	28	Kyle Sieg	RSS Racing	Ford	194	0	Accident	4
34	32	32	Katherine Legge (i)	Jordan Anderson Racing	Chevrolet	188	0	Accident	0
35	36	45	Brad Perez	Alpha Prime Racing	Chevrolet	182	0	Running	2
36	16	99	Matt DiBenedetto	Viking Motorsports	Chevrolet	81	0	Suspension	1
37	34	4	Parker Retzlaff	Alpha Prime Racing	Chevrolet	52	0	Engine	1
DSQ	13	8	Sammy Smith	JR Motorsports	Chevrolet	205	0	Running	1
Official race results

== Standings after the race ==
Drivers' Championship standings

	Pos	Driver	Points
	1	Justin Allgaier	522
	2	Austin Hill	450 (–72)
	3	Sam Mayer	429 (–93)
	4	Jesse Love	403 (–119)
	5	Brandon Jones	352 (–170)
6	6	Connor Zilisch	351 (–171)
1	7	Ryan Sieg	349 (–173)
2	8	Carson Kvapil	345 (–177)
2	9	Jeb Burton	343 (–179)
1	10	Sheldon Creed	333 (–189)
1	11	Harrison Burton	323 (–199)
3	12	Nick Sanchez	320 (–202)
Official driver's standings

Manufacturers' Championship standings

Pos	Manufacturer	Points
1	Chevrolet	510
2	Toyota	429 (–81)
3	Ford	410 (–100)

- Note: Only the first 12 positions are included for the driver standings.

Previous race: 2025 Andy's Frozen Custard 300	NASCAR Xfinity Series; 2025 season	Next race: 2025 Tennessee Lottery 250
