= 2026 eNASCAR Coca-Cola iRacing Championship Series =

American esports competition

Tournament information
- Sport: eNASCAR Coca-Cola iRacing Series
- Location: Regular Season & Playoffs: Online; Championship: Charlotte, North Carolina, US
- Dates: May 19–October 13
- Administrator: eNASCAR iRacing
- Venue: NASCAR Hall of Fame
- Defending champions: Steven Wilson (driver); Spire Motorsports (team)
- Purse: $511,000 USD

Final positions
- Champions: Steven Wilson (driver); Spire Motorsports (team)

Tournament statistics
- Rookie of the Year: Shawn Conklin

The 2026 eNASCAR Coca-Cola iRacing Championship Series was an iRacing sim racing esports competition for NASCAR and the 17th season of the eNASCAR Coca-Cola iRacing Series. It was the fifth season to have its season finale at the NASCAR Hall of Fame in Charlotte, North Carolina. Spire Motorsports and driver Steven Wilson entered the season as defending teams' and drivers' champions respectively.

2025 champions Steven Wilson and Spire Motorsports successfully defended their respective championships. Wilson won his third championship and became the first to win back-to-back championships since Ray Alfalla in 2011 and 2012.

== Background ==
iRacing is an online sim racing video game developed and published by iRacing Studios in 2008. In 2010, iRacing and NASCAR formed a partnership to host what is now the eNASCAR Coca-Cola iRacing Series. 2026 is Coca-Cola's seventh season as the title sponsor of the series.

== Qualification ==
A new qualification procedure was introduced for the 2026 season. Instead of a year-long season of the Qualifying Series, the series has been shortened and will now use all three National series (Cup, O'Reilly, and Trucks) cars. The top 30 in series points, as well as the top two finishers in the eNASCAR College iRacing Series will enter free agency with the top 20 finishers from the 2025 season. The Qualifying Series season started on February 10 and ended on April 28.

== Entries ==
Icon	Status
C	Past champion
R	Eligible for Rookie of the Year
RY	Rookie of the Year

Manufacturer	Team	No.	Driver	Round(s)
Chevrolet	Apex Racing Team	16	Ryan Doucette	All
Chevrolet	Apex Racing Team	98	Cody Byus	All
Chevrolet	BS+COMPETITION	89	Jordy Lopez	All
Chevrolet	BS+COMPETITION	99	Garrett Lowe	All
Chevrolet	ERA eSports Team	22	Bobby Zalenski	All
Chevrolet	ERA eSports Team	34	Michael Cosey Jr.	All
Chevrolet	Hyak Motorsports	47	Dylan Ault	All
Chevrolet	Hyak Motorsports	50	Quentin Warman	All
Chevrolet	JR Motorsports	8	Zack Novak C	All
Chevrolet	JR Motorsports	88	Malik Ray	All
Chevrolet	Kansas City Pioneers	20	Wyatt Tinsley	All
Chevrolet	Kansas City Pioneers	24	Casey Kirwan C	All
Chevrolet	Letarte Esports	36	Thomas Lloyd R	All
Chevrolet	Letarte Esports	40	Connor Yeroschak	All
Chevrolet	Rick Ware Racing	51	Garrett Manes	All
Chevrolet	Rick Ware Racing	55	Daniel Faulkingham	All
Chevrolet	Spire Motorsports	7	Femi Olatunboson	All
Chevrolet	Spire Motorsports	77	Steven Wilson C	All
Chevrolet	Team Dillon Esports	3	Blaze Crawford	All
Chevrolet	Team Dillon Esports	33	Kenny Brady R	1–10, 12
Chevrolet	Team Dillon Esports	33	Michael Frisch	11, 13
Chevrolet	William Byron eSports	25	Christopher Hill	All
Chevrolet	William Byron eSports	97	Tucker Minter	All
Chevrolet	Williams F1 Team Gaming	4	Donovan Strauss	All
Chevrolet	Williams F1 Team Gaming	95	Parker White C	All
Ford	Jim Beaver eSports	5	Nate Stewart	All
Ford	Jim Beaver eSports	15	Kollin Keister	1–8, 10–13
Ford	Jim Beaver eSports	15	Matthew Zwack	9
Ford	RFK Racing	6	Dylan Basen R	All
Ford	RFK Racing	17	Shawn Conklin RY	All
Toyota	Channel 199 Sim Racing	86	Blake Reynolds	All
Toyota	Channel 199 Sim Racing	199	Dylan Duval	All
Toyota	eRacr	42	Logan Helton R	All
Toyota	eRacr	69	Seth Noell R	All
Toyota	fgrACCEL eRacing	12	Ryan Luza C	All
Toyota	fgrACCEL eRacing	14	Seth DeMerchant	All
Toyota	Kanaan Esports	11	Vicente Salas	All
Toyota	Kanaan Esports	66	Sebastian Marin R	All
Toyota	TC Esports	35	Matthew Morton R	All
Toyota	TC Esports	73	Jake Nichols	All
Toyota	Vegas Inferno	01	Tommy Gossett R	All
Toyota	Vegas Inferno	21	Michael Guest	All

== Calendar ==
The schedule for the 2026 eNASCAR Coca-Cola iRacing Championship Series was released on February 9. The regular season is split into three segments with the highest points finisher in each segment receiving five playoff points and $3,000 USD. On June 2, iRacing announced that the Qualcomm Circuit would be replacing Iowa Speedway as the third race of the season, with Iowa Speedway taking the place of Autódromo Hermanos Rodríguez.

O Oval track
S Street course

No	Track	Date	Setup	Format	Laps
Regular season
Segment 1
1	O Charlotte Motor Speedway	May 19	Open	Standard	160
2	O EchoPark Speedway	June 2	Open	Standard	100
3	S Qualcomm Circuit	June 16	Open	Sprint	10/20
Segment 2
4	O Dover Motor Speedway	June 23	Open	Standard	120
5	O Iowa Speedway	July 7	Fixed	Heats	30/30/90
6	O Indianapolis Motor Speedway	July 14	Open	Standard	60
Segment 3
7	O Nashville Superspeedway	July 28	Open	Standard	100
8	O Richmond Raceway	August 4	Open	Heats	25/25/70
9	O Daytona International Speedway	August 18	Open	Standard	80
Playoffs
10	O Michigan International Speedway	September 1	Open	Standard	70
11	O Texas Motor Speedway	September 15	Open	Standard	100
12	O Kansas Speedway	September 22	Open	Standard	100
Championship
13	O Homestead-Miami Speedway	October 13	Open	Standard	100

== Results ==
No.	Race	Pole position	Most laps led	Winning driver	Winning team	Ref(s)
Regular season
1	Charlotte Motor Speedway	Bobby Zalenski	Bobby Zalenski	Bobby Zalenski	ERA eSports Team	
2	EchoPark Speedway	Vicente Salas	Garrett Manes	Steven Wilson	Spire Motorsports	
3	Qualcomm Circuit	Bobby Zalenski	Bobby Zalenski	Bobby Zalenski	ERA eSports Team	
4	Dover Motor Speedway	Quentin Warman	Bobby Zalenski	Steven Wilson	Spire Motorsports	
5	Iowa Speedway	Sebastian Marin	Garrett Lowe	Garrett Lowe	BS+COMPETITION	
6	Indianapolis Motor Speedway	Parker White	Parker White	Parker White	Williams F1 Team Gaming	
7	Nashville Superspeedway	Casey Kirwan	Dylan Basen	Bobby Zalenski	ERA eSports Team	
8	Richmond Raceway	Vicente Salas	Vicente Salas	Vicente Salas	Kanaan Esports	
9	Daytona International Speedway	Malik Ray	Steven Wilson	Garrett Manes	Rick Ware Racing	
Playoffs
10	Michigan International Speedway	Daniel Faulkingham	Steven Wilson	Steven Wilson	Spire Motorsports	
11	Texas Motor Speedway	Sebastian Marin	Sebastian Marin	Quentin Warman	Hyak Motorsports	
12	Kansas Speedway	Connor Yeroschak	Connor Yeroschak	Connor Yeroschak	Letarte Esports	
Championship
13	Homestead-Miami Speedway	Connor Yeroschak	Steven Wilson	Parker White	Williams F1 Team Gaming	

== Points standings ==
=== Scoring system ===
Position	1	2	3	4	5	6	7	8	9	10	11	12	13	14	15	16	17	18	19	20	21	22	23	24	25	26	27	28	29	30	31	32	33	34	35	36	37	38	39	40
Feature	40	35	34	33	32	31	30	29	28	27	26	25	24	23	22	21	20	19	18	17	16	15	14	13	12	11	10	9	8	7	6	5	4	3	2	1	1	1	1	1
Heat	10	9	8	7	6	5	4	3	2	1																														
Sprint	8	7	6	5	4	3	2	1																																

=== Drivers' championship ===
(Key) Bold – Pole position. Italics – Most laps led. ^{1–10} – Heat finish position. ^{1–8} – Sprint qualifying position.

. – Eliminated from the first round of the Playoffs . – Relegated to 2027 eNASCAR Coca-Cola iRacing Qualifying Series . – Reserve driver

Pos.	Driver	CLT	ATL	COR	DOV	IOW	IND	NSS	RCH	DAY	MCH	TXS	KAN	HOM	Pts.
1	Steven Wilson	3	1	2^{5}	1	3^{5}	23	29	3^{5}	19	1	4	7	2	3035
2	Connor Yeroschak	9	3	38	4	8^{10}	7	26	6^{4}	10	3	14	**1**	**4**	3033
3	Bobby Zalenski	**1**	22	**1**^{7}	31	31^{8}	28	1	18^{10}	9	5	11	10	5	3032
4	Wyatt Tinsley	5	16	18	7	13	14	11	22	18	4	7	9	8	3029
Playoffs cut-off
Pos.	Driver	CLT	ATL	COR	DOV	IOW	IND	NSS	RCH	DAY	MCH	TXS	KAN	HOM	Pts.
5	Casey Kirwan	25	19	5^{3}	24	23	3	**2**	16	12	18	20	5	12	2093
6	Tucker Minter	4	33	4^{1}	3	26^{7}	2	4	5^{7}	16	12	3	24	25	2084
7	Parker White	38	17	9^{2}	22	9^{3}	**1**	8	4^{2}	4	31	39	12	1	2082
8	Garrett Lowe	12	35	12	9	1^{1}	17	17	28^{8}	39	28	15	31	9	2075
9	Shawn Conklin **RY**	15	14	23	8	10^{7}	15	3	15^{5}	6	11	9	39	30	2062
10	Vicente Salas	11	**6**	2	10	4^{5}	34	22	**1**^{1}	33	29	38	33	7	2048
11	Zack Novak	13	5	8	27	22^{4}	35	13	7^{6}	8	9	17	3	20	306
12	Quentin Warman	17	39	15	**36**	5	4	12	2^{1}	25	14	1	36	3	291
13	Seth DeMerchant	7	10	22	38	28	21	5	39^{7}	21	8	2	13	6	276
14	Sebastian Marin **R**	14	23	25^{6}	25	**2**^{1}	25	40	17^{9}	30	6	**6**	2	10	275
15	Christopher Hill	2	11	29	14	37	5	21	14	22	7	22	14	16	268
16	Femi Olatunbosun	16	20	26	2	19	12	6	31	28	2	28	11	27	252
17	Matthew Morton **R**	23	18	24	17	15^{2}	18	18	11	27	22	8	6	35	248
18	Donovan Strauss	6	13	19	33	12^{2}	13	32	12	17	16	5	38	34	242
19	Daniel Faulkingham	30	2	10	16	35	36	16	18^{4}	7	**19**	13	29	26	239
20	Garrett Manes	40	27	40	28	14	19	20	21^{10}	1	15	10	16	24	217
21	Dylan Duval	18	31	7^{4}	6	11	38	23	8^{3}	38	17	32	35	19	215
22	Blaze Crawford	36	15	34	37	32	8	9	25	5	10	31	17	11	212
=	Michael Cosey Jr.	8	25	30	11	33^{10}	31	34	20	15	13	33	4	13	212
24	Jordy Lopez	33	30	16	5	7^{3}	22	7	9^{6}	32	37	36	28	28	205
25	Thomas Lloyd **R**	35	7	36	20	17	9	24	29	13	33	21	15	23	199
26	Jake Nichols	26	26	28	34	24	11	28	32^{9}	2	35	16	30	17	173
27	Blake Reynolds	10	12	17	40	29	33	35	27	3	27	12	34	37	170
28	Cody Byus	27	9	20	23	18	24	27	34	34	25	34	21	22	162
29	Kenny Brady **R**	28	8	31	21	27	16	19	19	23	34		22		159
=	Dylan Basen **R**	24	37	11	12	34^{6}	26	33	23	29	23	30	26	14	159
31	Seth Noell **R**	31	28	27	35	16	39	14	13^{3}	36	24	37	23	15	155
32	Michael Guest	32	40	33	18	31	20	10	24^{8}	35	39	18	8	29	154
33	Malik Ray	19	4	39	29	25^{8}	6	38	30	**20**	32	40	37	32	142
=	Nate Stewart	21	32	14	15	36	30	31	36	11	40	24	20	33	142
35	Dylan Ault	39	36	13	13	40	10	39	40	14	20	35	19	36	141
36	Tommy Gossett **R**	29	21	21	26	20	40	37	37	31	21	19	25	21	139
37	Ryan Luza	20	27	6^{8}	39	39	29	25	33^{2}	26	36	27	40	38	117
38	Ryan Doucette	37	24	32	32	21^{4}	27	30	35	24	26	26	27	31	116
39	Logan Helton **R**	34	38	35	30	30	32	15	38	37	30	23	18	18	108
40	Kollin Keister	22	34	37	19	6^{6}	37	36	26		38	25	26	40	99
41	Michael Frisch											29		39	9
42	Matthew Zwack									40					1

Color	Result
Gold	Winner
Silver	Finished 2nd–5th
Bronze	Finished 6th–10th
Green	Finished 11th–20th
Dark Blue	Finished 21st or worse
Purple	Did not finish (DNF)
Red	Did not qualify (DNQ)
Brown	Withdrew (Wth)
Black	Disqualified (DSQ)
White	Did Not Start (DNS)
White	Race abandoned (C)
Blank	Did not participate

=== Teams' championship ===
Pos.	Team	Pts.
1	Spire Motorsports	663
2	Kansas City Pioneers	634
3	William Byron eSports	604
4	Williams F1 Team Gaming	565
5	Letarte Esports	561
6	Kanaan Esports	547
7	ERA eSports Team	533
8	Rick Ware Racing	456
9	RFK Racing	455
10	BS+COMPETITION	453
11	JR Motorsports	448
12	Hyak Motorsports	432
13	TC Esports	421
14	fgrACCEL eRacing	393
15	Channel 199 Sim Racing	385
16	Team Dillon Esports	380
17	Vegas Inferno	293
18	Apex Racing Team	278
19	eRacr	263
20	Jim Beaver Esports	254
