= Donovan Strauss =

American racing driver (born 2005)

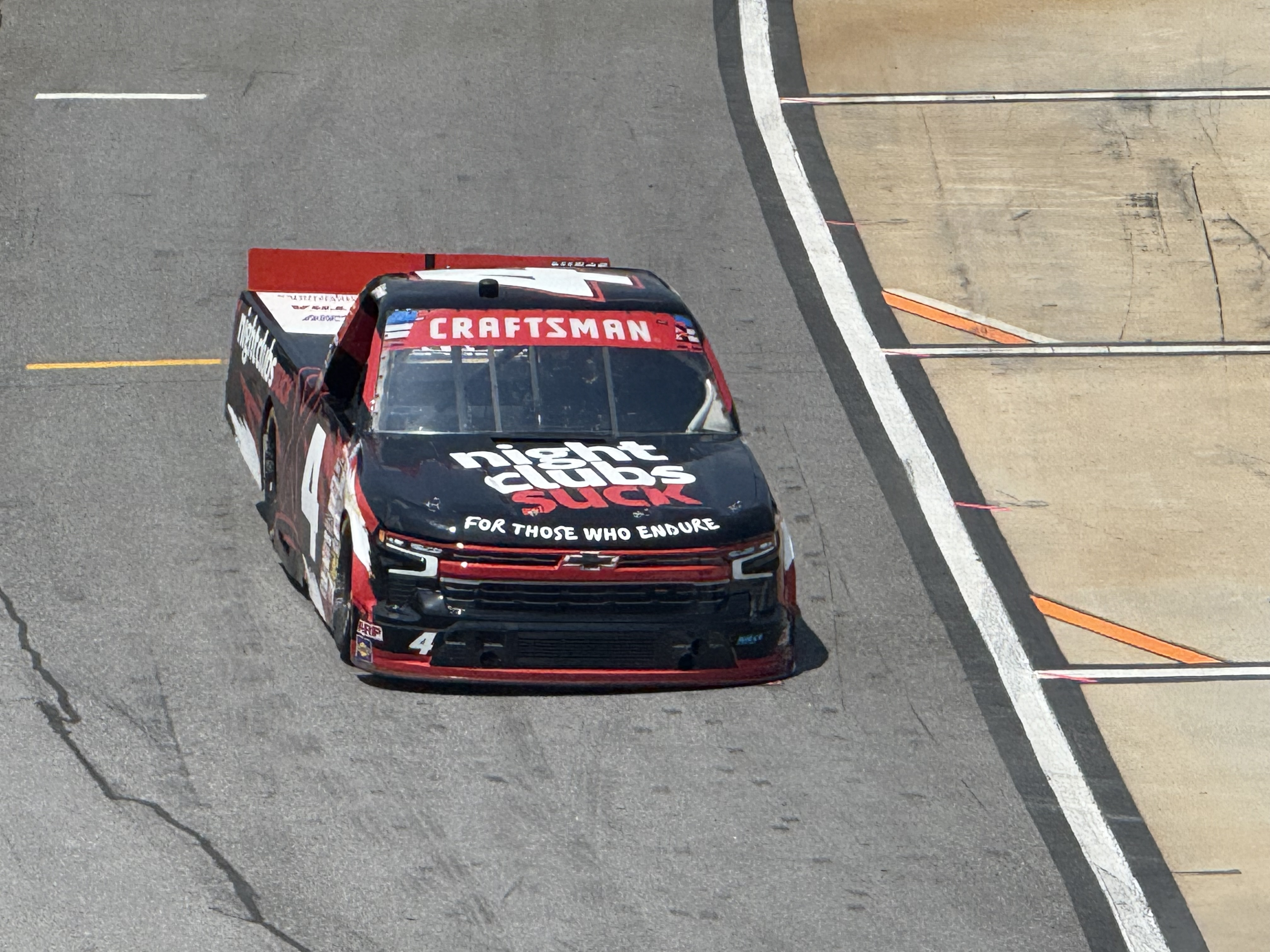
- Strauss' No. 4 truck at North Wilkesboro Speedway in 2026
- Born: August 15, 2005 (age 21) Mooresville, North Carolina, US

CARS Late Model Stock Tour career
- Debut season: 2024
- Years active: 2024–present
- Starts: 21
- Championships: 0
- Wins: 0
- Poles: 0
- Best finish: 9th in 2025

NASCAR FedEx Freight Truck Series career
- 2 races run over 1 year
- 2026 position: 76th
- Best finish: 76th (2026)
- First race: 2026 FaithFest 250 (North Wilkesboro)
- Last race: 2026 Zero Carbon Bioethanol 150 (Phoenix)
Wins	Top tens	Poles
0	0	0

Esports career information
- Game: iRacing

Team history
- 2022–2026: Williams F1 Team Gaming

Career highlights and awards
- 2022 eNASCAR Coca-Cola iRacing Series Rookie of the Year
- Statistics up to date as of November 6, 2026.

Donovan Strauss (born August 15, 2005) is an American professional stock car racing driver. He last competed in the zMAX CARS Tour, driving the No. 51/98 for AK Performance, and part-time in the NASCAR Craftsman Truck Series, driving the No. 4 Chevrolet Silverado RST for Niece Motorsports.

Strauss also competes in the eNASCAR Coca-Cola iRacing Series, currently driving for Williams F1 Team Gaming.

== Racing career ==
Strauss began his racing career at the age of 14, where he raced on iRacing. Several years later, he began competing in bandoleros in 2020, where he finished second in the national standings, before moving to legends cars the following year. Strauss won the INEX Pro National Championship in 2023.

In 2024, Strauss moved to late models, where he drove for AK Performance in select races in the NASCAR Weekly Series and the CARS Tour. He won the South Carolina state Rookie of the Year title in the weekly series.

In 2025, it was announced that Strauss would move to Hettinger Racing, where he would drive full-time in the CARS Late Model Stock Tour.

In 2026, Strauss would remain in the CARS Tour, this time driving for AK Performance, having originally signed to drive for Tom Usry Racing.

=== NASCAR ===
==== Craftsman Truck Series ====
On April 16, 2026, it was announced that Strauss would attempt to make his debut in the NASCAR Craftsman Truck Series at North Wilkesboro Speedway, driving the No. 4 Chevrolet for Niece Motorsports.

== Esports career ==
Strauss attempted to qualify for the eNASCAR Coca-Cola iRacing Series in 2020 and 2021, but failed to make the main field. Strauss finally qualified for the series in 2022, signing with Williams Esports. Strauss finished the 2022 season 20th in points with a best finish of fourth, earning Strauss the Rookie of the Year award. Strauss returned to Williams for 2023, earning his first career victory at the season finale at Homestead-Miami Speedway. Strauss remained winless in 2024 and 2025, but stayed above relegation with a 13th and 11th-place points finish.

=== Esports career summary ===
Season	Series	Team	Wins	Top 5	Poles	Laps Led	Points	Position
2022	eNASCAR Coca-Cola iRacing Series	Williams Esports	0	2	0	0	300	20th
2023	eNASCAR Coca-Cola iRacing Series	Williams Esports	1	2	1	159	358	16th
2024	eNASCAR Coca-Cola iRacing Series	Williams Esports	0	2	2	78	359	13th
2025	eNASCAR Coca-Cola iRacing Series	Atlassian Williams Racing	0	4	0	12	373	11th
2026	eNASCAR Coca-Cola iRacing Championship Series	Williams F1 Team Gaming	0	0	0	0	135*	9th*

* Season ongoing

== Racing results ==
=== Stock car career summary ===
Season	Series	Team	Races	Wins	Top 5	Top 10	Points	Position
2024	CARS Late Model Stock Car Tour	AK Performance	1	0	0	0	0	N/A
2025	CARS Late Model Stock Car Tour	Hettinger Racing	15	0	0	5	423	9th
2026	CARS Pro Late Model Tour	Hettinger Racing	1	0	0	0	31	51st
2026	CARS Late Model Stock Car Tour	AK Performance	5	0	0	1	126	32nd
2026	NASCAR Craftsman Truck Series	Niece Motorsports	2	0	0	0	14	76th

=== NASCAR ===
(key) (Bold – Pole position awarded by qualifying time. Italics – Pole position earned by points standings or practice time. * – Most laps led.)

==== Craftsman Truck Series ====
NASCAR Craftsman Truck Series results
Year	Team	No.	Make	1	2	3	4	5	6	7	8	9	10	11	12	13	14	15	16	17	18	19	20	21	22	23	24	25	NCTC	Pts	Ref
2026	Niece Motorsports	4	Chevy	DAY	ATL	STP	DAR	CAR	BRI	TEX	GLN	DOV	CLT	NSH	MCH	COR	LRP	NWS; 36	IRP	RCH	NHA	BRI	KAN	CLT	PHO; 24	TAL	MAR	HOM	76th	14	

=== CARS Late Model Stock Car Tour ===
(key) (Bold – Pole position awarded by qualifying time. Italics – Pole position earned by points standings or practice time. * – Most laps led. ** – All laps led.)

CARS Late Model Stock Car Tour results
Year	Team	No.	Make	1	2	3	4	5	6	7	8	9	10	11	12	13	14	15	16	17	CLMSCTC	Pts	Ref
2024	AK Performance	51S	N/A	SNM	HCY	AAS	OCS	ACE	TCM	LGY	DOM	CRW	HCY	NWS	ACE	WCS	FLC; 16	SBO	TCM	NWS	N/A	0	
2025	Hettinger Racing	4S	Chevy	AAS; 9	WCS; 8	CDL; 18	OCS; 10	ACE; 9	NWS; 15	LGY; 12	DOM; 19	CRW; 7		AND; 11	FLC; 12	SBO; 15	TCM; 27	NWS; 22			9th	423	
2025	Hettinger Racing	4	Chevy										HCY; 15								9th	423	
2026	AK Performance	98	Chevy	SNM; 13	WCS; DNQ	NSV; 19	CRW; 26	ACE													32nd	126	
2026	AK Performance	51	Chevy						LGY; 8	DOM; 23	NWS	HCY	AND	FLC	TCM	NPS	SBO				32nd	126	

=== CARS Pro Late Model Tour ===
(key)

CARS Pro Late Model Tour results
Year	Team	No.	Make	1	2	3	4	5	6	7	8	9	10	11	CPLMTC	Pts	Ref
2026	Hettinger Racing	51	Chevy	SNM	NSV	CRW	ACE	NWS	HCY	AND	FLC; 11	TCM; Wth	NPS	SBO	51st	31	
