= 2025 eNASCAR Coca-Cola iRacing Series =

IRacing esports competition

Tournament information
- Sport: eNASCAR Coca-Cola iRacing Series
- Location: Regular Season & Playoffs: Online; Championship: Charlotte, North Carolina, US
- Dates: February 11–October 7
- Administrator: eNASCAR iRacing
- Venue: NASCAR Hall of Fame
- Participants: 46
- Defending champions: Parker White (driver); Williams F1 Team Gaming (team)
- Purse: $511,000 USD

Final positions
- Champions: Steven Wilson (driver); Spire Motorsports (team)

Tournament statistics
- Rookie of the Year: Connor Yeroschak

The 2025 eNASCAR Coca-Cola iRacing Series was an iRacing sim racing esports competition for NASCAR and the 16th season of the eNASCAR Coca-Cola iRacing Series. It was the fourth season to have its season finale at the NASCAR Hall of Fame in Charlotte, North Carolina. Atlassian Williams Racing and driver Parker White entered the season as defending teams' and drivers' champions respectively.

2023 champion Steven Wilson became the first driver since Ray Alfalla to win multiple championships, winning a series-record eight races. Spire Motorsports won their first teams' championship.

== Background ==
iRacing is an online sim racing video game developed and published by iRacing Studios in 2008. In 2010, iRacing and NASCAR formed a partnership to host what is now the eNASCAR Coca-Cola iRacing Series. 2025 is Coca-Cola's sixth season as the title sponsor of the series.

== Qualification ==
iRacing players wishing to participate in the series must qualify through the eNASCAR Qualifying Series. The top 20 (Note: More Qualifying Series drivers may qualify if any relegated eNASCAR Coca-Cola iRacing Series driver declines to participate.) drivers from the Qualifying Series and the bottom 20 drivers from the 2024 eNASCAR Coca-Cola iRacing Series are invited to participate in the eNASCAR Contender Series to qualify for the next season. The top 30 drivers in the Contender Series advanced to a draft pool to be selected by teams. The ten drivers not selected by any team can be selected as a reserve driver. The Contender Series took place from October 8 to November 19.

== Entries ==
Icon	Status
C	Past champion
R	Eligible for Rookie of the Year
RY	Rookie of the Year

Manufacturer	Team	No.	Driver	Round(s)	Ref(s)
Chevrolet	Apex Racing Team	96	Christopher Hill R	All	
Chevrolet	Apex Racing Team	98	Cody Byus	All	
Chevrolet	Atlassian Williams Racing	51	Donovan Strauss	1-3	
Chevrolet	Atlassian Williams Racing	4	Donovan Strauss	4-18	
Chevrolet	Atlassian Williams Racing	95	Parker White C	All	
Chevrolet	BS+COMPETITION	89	Jordy Lopez	All	
Chevrolet	BS+COMPETITION	99	Garrett Lowe	All	
Chevrolet	ERA eSports Team	22	Bobby Zalenski	All	
Chevrolet	ERA eSports Team	34	Ryan Doucette	18	
Chevrolet	ERA eSports Team	38	Michael Cosey Jr.	1-17	
Chevrolet	Hyak Motorsports	47	Dylan Ault	All	
Chevrolet	Hyak Motorsports	50	Quentin Warman R	All	
Chevrolet	JR Motorsports	8	Blake McCandless R	All	
Chevrolet	JR Motorsports	88	Briar LaPradd	1-10, 13-18	
Chevrolet	JR Motorsports	88	Matthew Zwack	11	
Chevrolet	JR Motorsports	88	Ethan Lane	12	
Chevrolet	Kansas City Pioneers	24	Casey Kirwan C	All	
Chevrolet	Kansas City Pioneers	48	Graham Bowlin	All	
Chevrolet	Kevin Harvick, Inc.	29	Jimmy Mullis	All	
Chevrolet	Kevin Harvick, Inc.	62	Matt Bussa	All	
Chevrolet	LETARTE eSports	36	Quami Scott	All	
Chevrolet	LETARTE eSports	40	Connor Yeroschak RY	All	
Chevrolet	Spire Motorsports	7	Femi Olatunbosun	All	
Chevrolet	Spire Motorsports	77	Steven Wilson C	All	
Chevrolet	Team Dillon Esports	3	Blaze Crawford R	All	
Chevrolet	Team Dillon Esports	33	Taylor Hurst	1-5, 7-18	
Chevrolet	Team Dillon Esports	33	Wyatt Tinsley	6	
Chevrolet	Vegas Inferno	1	Malik Ray	1-10, 12-18	
Chevrolet	Vegas Inferno	1	Agnel Philip	11	
Chevrolet	Vegas Inferno	21	Michael Guest	All	
Chevrolet	William Byron eSports	25	Nick Ottinger	All	
Chevrolet	William Byron eSports	97	Tucker Minter	All	
Ford	Jim Beaver Esports	5	Nate Stewart R	All	
Ford	Jim Beaver Esports	15	Kollin Keister	1-17	
Ford	Jim Beaver Esports	15	Matthew Zwack	18	
Ford	RFK Racing	6	Collin Bowden	All	
Ford	RFK Racing	17	Timothy Holmes	All	
Ford	Six Karma	19	Eddie Kerner R	1-16, 18	
Ford	Six Karma	19	Michael Frisch	17	
Ford	Six Karma	39	Daniel Faulkingham	All	
Toyota	Channel 199 Sim Racing	2	Zack Novak C	All	
Toyota	Channel 199 Sim Racing	199	Dylan Duval	All	
Toyota	eRacr	42	Logan Clampitt	1-10, 12, 15, 17-18	
Toyota	eRacr	42	Matthew Morton	11	
Toyota	eRacr	42	Ryan Doucette	13	
Toyota	eRacr	42	Michael Frisch	14	
Toyota	eRacr	42	Brian Mercurio	16	
Toyota	eRacr	69	Tyler Garey	1-17	
Toyota	eRacr	69	Brian Mercurio	18	
Toyota	fgrACCEL eRacing	12	Ryan Luza C	All	
Toyota	fgrACCEL eRacing	14	Seth DeMerchant	All	
Toyota	Tony Kanaan Esports	11	Vicente Salas	All	
Toyota	Tony Kanaan Esports	66	Alexander Russell R	All	

== Calendar ==
The schedule for the 2025 eNASCAR Coca-Cola iRacing Series was released on January 6. The regular season is split into three segments with the highest points finisher in each segment receiving five playoff points and $3,000 USD.

O Oval track
R Road course
S Street course

No	Track	Date	Setup	Format	Laps
EX	O Daytona International Speedway	January 28	Fixed	Heats	10/10/20
Regular season
Segment 1
1	O Daytona International Speedway	February 11	Open	Standard	80
2	O Las Vegas Motor Speedway	February 25	Open	Standard	100
3	R Interlagos Circuit	March 4	Open	Sprint	12/24
4	O Richmond Raceway	March 25	Open	Heats	25/25/70
5	O Rockingham Speedway	April 8	Open	Standard	200
Segment 2
6	O Talladega Superspeedway	April 22	Fixed	Standard	70
7	O Charlotte Motor Speedway	May 20	Open	Standard	160
8	O Nashville Superspeedway	May 27	Open	Standard	100
9	O Kansas Speedway	June 3	Open	Standard	100
Segment 3
10	O Iowa Speedway	June 17	Open	Heats	30/30/90
11	O Dover Motor Speedway	June 24	Open	Standard	120
12	S Chicago Street Course	July 1	Fixed	Sprint	15/30
13	O Indianapolis Motor Speedway	July 22	Open	Standard	60
14	O Pocono Raceway^{1}	August 5	Open	Standard	60
Playoffs
15	O Michigan International Speedway	August 19	Open	Standard	70
16	O Texas Motor Speedway	September 2	Open	Standard	100
17	O Phoenix Raceway	September 16	Open	Standard	120
Championship
18	O Homestead-Miami Speedway	October 7	Open	Standard	100

^{1} Atlanta Motor Speedway was originally scheduled as the 14th race of the season but was replaced by Pocono Raceway on July 30.

== Results ==
=== Race results ===
No.	Race	Pole position	Most laps led	Winning driver	Winning team	Ref(s)
EX	Daytona International Speedway	Briar LaPradd	Zack Novak	Parker White	Atlassian Williams Racing	
Regular season
1	Daytona International Speedway	Logan Clampitt	Briar LaPradd	Steven Wilson	Spire Motorsports	
2	Las Vegas Motor Speedway	Vicente Salas	Femi Olatunbosun	Kollin Keister	Jim Beaver Esports	
3	Interlagos Circuit	Vicente Salas	Steven Wilson	Steven Wilson	Spire Motorsports	
4	Richmond Raceway	Zack Novak	Zack Novak	Steven Wilson	Spire Motorsports	
5	Rockingham Speedway	Nick Ottinger	Tucker Minter	Tucker Minter	William Byron eSports	
6	Talladega Superspeedway	Quentin Warman	Casey Kirwan	Bobby Zalenski	ERA eSports Team	
7	Charlotte Motor Speedway	Casey Kirwan	Steven Wilson	Tucker Minter	William Byron eSports	
8	Nashville Superspeedway	Ryan Luza	Ryan Luza	Tucker Minter	William Byron eSports	
9	Kansas Speedway	Parker White	Parker White	Steven Wilson	Spire Motorsports	
10	Iowa Speedway	Michael Cosey Jr.	Michael Cosey Jr.	Steven Wilson	Spire Motorsports	
11	Dover Motor Speedway	Nick Ottinger	Vicente Salas	Vicente Salas	Tony Kanaan Esports	
12	Chicago Street Course	Vicente Salas	Vicente Salas	Vicente Salas	Tony Kanaan Esports	
13	Indianapolis Motor Speedway	Vicente Salas	Vicente Salas	Steven Wilson	Spire Motorsports	
14	Pocono Raceway	Tucker Minter	Bobby Zalenski	Bobby Zalenski	ERA eSports Team	
Playoffs
15	Michigan International Speedway	Tucker Minter	Tucker Minter	Steven Wilson	Spire Motorsports	
16	Texas Motor Speedway	Parker White	Seth DeMerchant	Zack Novak	Channel 199 Sim Racing	
17	Phoenix Raceway	Vicente Salas	Vicente Salas	Vicente Salas	Tony Kanaan Esports	
Championship 4
18	Homestead-Miami Speedway	Steven Wilson	Steven Wilson	Steven Wilson	Spire Motorsports	

== Points standings ==
=== Scoring system ===
Position	1	2	3	4	5	6	7	8	9	10	11	12	13	14	15	16	17	18	19	20	21	22	23	24	25	26	27	28	29	30	31	32	33	34	35	36	37	38	39	40
Feature	40	35	34	33	32	31	30	29	28	27	26	25	24	23	22	21	20	19	18	17	16	15	14	13	12	11	10	9	8	7	6	5	4	3	2	1	1	1	1	1
Heat	10	9	8	7	6	5	4	3	2	1																														
Sprint	8	7	6	5	4	3	2	1																																

=== Drivers' championship ===
(Key) Bold – Pole position. Italics – Most laps led. ^{1–10} – Heat finish position. ^{1–8} – Sprint qualifying position.

. – Eliminated from the first round of the Playoffs . – Relegated to 2026 eNASCAR Coca-Cola iRacing Qualifying Series . – Reserve driver

Pos.	Driver	DAY	LVS	BRA	RCH	ROC	TAL	CLT	NSS	KAN	IOW	DOV	CSC	IND	POC	MCH	TXS	PHO	HOM	Pts.
1	Steven Wilson	1	37	1^{2}	1^{2}	18	7	9	4	1	1^{4}	29	3^{5}	1	4	1	3	39	**1**	3040
2	Casey Kirwan	6	12	4^{6}	35^{8}	25	6	**11**	13	3	36^{2}	5	4^{5}	22	7	2	9	4	6	3031
3	Vicente Salas	20	**30**	3^{1}	4^{1}	12	39	30	5	5	14^{1}	1	**1**^{1}	**25**	14	5	32	**1**	8	3029
4	Zack Novak	4	14	8^{5}	**2**^{1}	2	27	8	6	24	2^{3}	9	19	2	3	33	1	5	12	3025
Playoffs cut-off
Pos.	Driver	DAY	LVS	BRA	RCH	ROC	TAL	CLT	NSS	KAN	IOW	DOV	CSC	IND	POC	MCH	TXS	PHO	HOM	Pts.
5	Parker White	2	3	5^{7}	3^{8}	35	14	2	19	**4**	30	35	6^{6}	7	12	4	**4**	16	4	2120
6	Tucker Minter	5	11	10	8^{2}	1	26	1	1	2	38	14	8	35	**21**	**35**	2	11	5	2110
7	Bobby Zalenski	33	15	2^{3}	20^{3}	27	1	10	3	21	25^{7}	6	2^{3}	11	1	9	25	7	15	2102
8	Jordy Lopez	8	21	6	40	28	18	13	31	10	4^{6}	7	7^{7}	3	37	16	36	3	10	2083
9	Dylan Duval	37	13	9	21^{9}	7	3	23	12	33	29^{3}	4	9^{8}	26	6	19	5	34	16	2074
10	Kollin Keister	13	1	35	15	6	21	5	36	12	8	3	22	28	29	39	10	21		2049
11	Donovan Strauss	19	4	32	5^{6}	40	5	12	10	18	15	28	39	30	17	10	11	8	2	373
12	Connor Yeroschak **RY**	11	25	20	28	9	28	24	18	16	7^{10}	8	37	9	8	24	14	2	11	369
13	Femi Olatunbosun	7	9	29	7^{3}	13	38	18	26	14	21	33	25	16	10	3	21	15	7	364
14	Ryan Luza	34	26	14	35^{10}	14	30	15	**2**	8	31^{2}	2	15	5	28	32	7	6	9	363
15	Dylan Ault	9	22	7^{4}	6^{7}	8	24	25	25	35	9^{8}	10	14	40	19	26	35	9	18	340
16	Michael Guest	16	29	24	24	4	10	14	34	6	13^{10}	19	21	6	22	8	39	19	29	333
17	Christopher Hill **R**	28	17	36	22	19	17	27	28	15	12^{5}	12	36	4	2	6	12	23	27	329
18	Seth DeMerchant	40	5	40	33	17	31	3	9	13	3^{6}	13	24	24	5	37	27	13	22	321
19	Blaze Crawford **R**	25	8	26	9	23	21	16	21	17	19^{9}	36	33	15	11	12	13	30	13	320
20	Malik Ray	3	10	39	12	5	2	36	8	28	34^{7}		23	38	25	7	6	25	24	313
21	Graham Bowlin	18	40	38	11^{9}	10	25	4	11	25	11	40	20	8	33	17	31	26	3	307
=	Michael Cosey Jr.	23	2	13	18	34	22	7	22	7	**10**^{1}	18	32	21	38	22	28	17		307
23	Garrett Lowe	35	31	11	34^{5}	26	34	6	7	30	18^{9}	38	5^{4}	10	9	29	29	10	21	306
24	Quentin Warman **R**	30	7	16	32	36	**4**	37	16	22	28	32	10	12	15	15	17	18	19	301
25	Nick Ottinger	31	35	17^{8}	30^{7}	**21**	32	21	15	19	17	**31**	13	13	34	13	23	14	23	274
26	Daniel Faulkingham	14	6	25	10	38	9	28	40	9	40	39	18	23	31	20	16	35	25	253
27	Matt Bussa	22	19	18	16^{6}	29	23	38	33	39	16^{8}	20	11	14	30	18	24	24	35	250
28	Tyler Garey	12	28	19	25	20	20	40	29	23	6	37	17	18	13	34	19	33		237
29	Jimmy Mullis	10	20	12	37^{4}	32	8	26	14	20	33^{5}	30	26	32	40	11	26	38	36	235
30	Quami Scott	21	32	23	29^{5}	21	15	35	23	40	27	24	30	17	18	25	33	20	20	223
31	Cody Byus	32	16	31	31	15	36	22	17	29	22	11	12	29	27	31	30	31	28	218
32	Blake McCandless **R**	27	18	27	19	11	35	20	39	26	23	22	27	36	32	27	8	28	38	208
33	Timothy Holmes	17	23	30	23	16	12	39	24	34	20	34	29	33	20	30	37	40	37	177
34	Eddie Kerner **R**	38	36	28	13	33	37	17	38	11	35	23	31	39	24	14	18		31	170
=	Alexander Russell **R**	15	33	21	26	24	40	32	30	32	26	21	28	27	39	23	20	37	30	170
36	Nate Stewart **R**	36	38	22	17	30	13	34	32	31	24	17	16	37	35	21	34	29	34	169
37	Collin Bowden	39	27	34	27	3	11	19	27	37	37	27	38	31	16	28	40	36	39	164
38	Logan Clampitt	29	24	15	14^{10}	39	19	29	20	27	39		34			38		12	31	156
39	Taylor Hurst	24	34	37	38	37		31	35	36	5^{4}	15	40	34	23	36	38	27	26	137
40	Briar LaPradd	26	39	33	39	31	29	33	37	38	32			19	26	40	15	22	40	110
41	Brian Mercurio																22		14	38
42	Matthew Zwack											26							17	31
43	Matthew Morton											16								21
=	Wyatt Tinsley						16													21
=	Ryan Doucette													20					33	21
46	Agnel Philip											25								12
47	Michael Frisch														36			32		6
48	Ethan Lane												35							2

Color	Result
Gold	Winner
Silver	Finished 2nd–5th
Bronze	Finished 6th–10th
Green	Finished 11th–20th
Dark Blue	Finished 21st or worse
Purple	Did not finish (DNF)
Red	Did not qualify (DNQ)
Brown	Withdrew (Wth)
Black	Disqualified (DSQ)
White	Did Not Start (DNS)
White	Race abandoned (C)
Blank	Did not participate

=== Teams' championship ===
Pos.	Team	Pts.
1	Spire Motorsports	929
2	Channel 199 Sim Racing	889
3	Atlassian Williams Racing	841
4	Kansas City Pioneers	782
5	ERA eSports	769
6	William Byron eSports	729
7	BS+COMPETITION	692
8	fgrACCEL eRacing	684
9	Vegas Inferno	658
10	Hyak Motorsports	641
11	Tony Kanaan Esports	624
12	LETARTE eSports	592
13	Apex Racing Team	547
14	Jim Beaver Esports	509
15	Kevin Harvick, Inc.	485
16	Team Dillon Esports	478
17	eRacr	475
18	Six Karma	428
19	RFK Racing	341
20	JR Motorsports	331
