= Blake McCandless =

American sportscaster (born 1996)

- Born: Blake Russell McCandless; May 18, 1996 (age 30); Raleigh, North Carolina, US
- Education: Gardner–Webb University
- Occupations: Play-by-play and color announcing, pit reporter, sim racer
- Years active: 2016–present

Blake Russell McCandless (born May 18, 1996) is an American sportscaster and esports driver. He last raced for JR Motorsports in the 2025 eNASCAR Coca-Cola iRacing Series.

== Career ==
McCandless' first foray into sportscasting came in 2016 with play-by-play broadcasting iRacing private events. In 2020, McCandless was named a color analyst for broadcasts of the eNASCAR Coca-Cola iRacing Series. After receiving praise from Dale Earnhardt Jr., McCandless secured roles as track announcer for Ace Speedway and pit spotting for NBC Sports. In 2023, McCandless was named co-commentator for the CARS Tour on FloRacing. McCandless made his national television debut in 2025 pit reporting for Fox Sports for the CARS Tour race at North Wilkesboro Speedway.

McCandless attempted to qualify for the eNASCAR Coca-Cola iRacing Series as early as 2020. He qualified for the series in 2025 and signed with JR Motorsports. During the season, McCandless received a one-race suspension for intentionally crashing during a race, but was later appealed and overturned. McCandless finished 32nd in points with one top-ten finish.

McCandless made two starts racing limited late model cars at Hickory Motor Speedway with a best finish of sixth.

== Personal life ==
McCandless was born on May 18, 1996 in Raleigh, North Carolina. McCandless graduated from Gardner–Webb University with a Master of Business Administration in 2020.

McCandless is the grandson of drag racer Herb McCandless. He has an identical twin brother named Phillip.

== Racing record ==
=== Complete eNASCAR Coca-Cola iRacing Series results ===
(key) (Bold – Pole position. * – Most laps led.)

Year	Team	No.	1	2	3	4	5	6	7	8	9	10	11	12	13	14	15	16	17	18	Rank	Points
2025	JR Motorsports	8	DAY; 27	LVS; 18	BRA; 27	RCH; 19	ROC; 11	TAL; 35	CLT; 20	NSH; 39	KAN; 26	IOW; 23	DOV; 22	CSC; 27	IND; 36	POC; 32	MCH; 27	TEX; 8	PHO; 28	HOM; 38	**32nd**	**208**
