= ENASCAR College iRacing Series =

Esports racing league

eNASCAR College iRacing Series
- Category: Esports (Racing)
- Country: United States
- Inaugural season: 2022
- Drivers: 40
- Drivers' champion: Connor Yeroschak
- Teams' champion: University of Calgary
- Official website: eNASCAR College iRacing Series

The eNASCAR College iRacing Series is a collegiate esports league that is sanctioned by eNASCAR. The league began in 2022 and is one of the first officially sanctioned collegiate esports racing series. The series is run through the iRacing motorsport simulation platform.

== History ==
Founded in the Spring of 2022, the series initially ran 3 races, having more than 250 universities represented. The series would officially kick off in the Fall Semester of 2022, hosting 4 races at Homestead, Auto Club, the Charlotte Roval, and Nashville. Steven Wilson, representing the University of Iowa would win the inaugural championship.

For the 2026–27 season, organizers introduced the School Championship. Points are earned from the highest finishers from each school in every race. Only schools with two or more drivers participating in that weeks time trial are eligible for earning School Championship points.

== Schedule ==
=== 2026–2027 Schedule & Results ===
Time Trial Date	First Round Date	Second Round Date	Track	Vehicle	Race	Winner
September 15–20	September 23	September 30	EchoPark Speedway	Trucks	Peachtree Pursuit	Jacob Wilkerson (Tarrant County)
September 29–October 4	October 7	October 14	Charlotte Motor Speedway	Trucks	Queen City Crown	Timothy Holmes (Horry-Georgetown)
October 20–25	October 28	November 4	Watkins Glen International	Mustang GT4	Big Apple Battle	Hector Collazo (Daytona State)
November 3–8	November 11	November 18	Michigan International Speedway	Trucks	Great Lakes Gauntlet	—*
January 19–24	January 27	February 3	Dover Motor Speedway	Trucks	Monster Mash	—*
February 2–7	February 10	February 17	Daytona International Speedway	Trucks	Clash on the Beach	—*
February 16–21	February 24	March 3	Daytona International Speedway	Mustang GT4	Ocean's Roar	—*
March 16–21	March 24	March 31	Homestead–Miami Speedway	Trucks	Sunset Splash	—*

* Race has not yet taken place

== Format ==
=== Race Format ===
As of fall 2026, the series' race format consists of the top 100 drivers qualifying in to week one through a time trial. After this, they are split into two separate groups divided equally from 1st to 100th. Each individual group goes through two heat races and a Last Chance Qualifier (LCQ). The top 13 from the heat races advance to the second round feature race, with the rest being placed into the LCQ. From there, the top 10 in the LCQ advance to the second round feature race, with the rest being eliminated, coming to a total field size of 36 for each group. The top 20 semifinals finishers advance to week two, resulting in a total field size of 40.

== Champions ==
Season	Driver	Team
Fall 2022	Steven Wilson	University of Iowa
Spring 2023	Logan Clampitt	Saddleback College
2023-2024	Steven Wilson (2)	University of Iowa (2)
2024-2025	Logan Clampitt (2)	California State University, Fullerton
2025-2026	Connor Yeroschak	University of Calgary
