= Steven Wilson (gamer) =

American esports driver (born 2001)

Personal information
- Born: November 12, 2001 (age 25); Cedar Rapids, Iowa, US

Career information
- Game: iRacing

Team history
- 2021: Roush Fenway Racing
- 2022–2023: Stewart-Haas eSports
- 2024: M80
- 2025–2026: Spire Motorsports

Career highlights and awards
- 3× eNASCAR Coca-Cola iRacing Series champion (2023, 2025, 2026); 2× eNASCAR College iRacing Series champion (2022, 2023–24)

Steven Wilson (born November 12, 2001) is an American esports driver who drives for Spire Motorsports in the eNASCAR Coca-Cola iRacing Series. Wilson won the 2023, 2025, and 2026 championships, becoming only the second driver to win more than one title. He also won the 2022 and 2023–24 eNASCAR College iRacing Series championships.

== Career ==
In 2019, Wilson drove in iRacing's World of Outlaws Morton Buildings Late Model Championship, finishing the season eighth overall with one top-five finish.

Wilson finished in 21st place in the 2020 iRacing Pro Series, enough to qualify for the 2021 eNASCAR Coca-Cola iRacing Series. Wilson signed with Roush Fenway Racing for the 2021 season, finishing his rookie season 13th overall with a best finish of second.

In 2022, Wilson signed with Stewart-Haas eSports. Wilson scored his first career win at Atlanta Motor Speedway, winning three more races and qualifying for the championship round for the first time. Wilson finished the season fourth overall. Meanwhile, Wilson won all four races of the eNASCAR College iRacing Series in the winter, winning his first College Series championship. Wilson re-signed with Stewart-Haas for the 2023 season. He only won one race during the season, but accrued enough points to qualify for the championship round for the second year in a row. He finished second in the final race and won his first eNASCAR Coca-Cola iRacing Series championship, winning $100,000. Between the 2023 and 2024 seasons, Wilson won his second College Series title.

For 2024, Wilson signed with esports organization M80. Wilson equaled his 2022 season with four wins and again qualified for the championship round. He again finished second in the final race, but finished behind newly crowned Parker White and did not defend his championship title.

In 2025, Wilson signed with Spire Motorsports. Wilson won a record-breaking eight races, qualified for the championship round for the fourth straight year, and won his second championship title after leading 85 of 100 laps of the final race. He became the second driver to win multiple championships in the series. Wilson re-signed with Spire Motorsports for 2026, also becoming their sim driver. Wilson qualified for the championship round for the fifth straight year and successfully defended his title, becoming the first back-to-back champion since Ray Alfalla in 2011 and 2012.

== Personal life ==
Wilson grew up in Cedar Rapids and graduated from the University of Iowa in 2025. As of 2026, he currently resides in North Carolina.

== Racing record ==
=== Esports career summary ===
Season	Series	Team	Wins	Top 5	Poles	Laps Led	Points	Position
2019	iRacing World of Outlaws Morton Buildings Late Model Championship		0	1	0	10	444	6th
2021	eNASCAR Coca-Cola iRacing Series	Roush Fenway Racing	0	6	0	57	374	13th
2022	eNASCAR Coca-Cola iRacing Series	Stewart–Haas Esports	4	8	1	146	3015	4th
2023	eNASCAR Coca-Cola iRacing Series	Stewart–Haas Esports	1	5	1	39	3035	1st
2024	eNASCAR Coca-Cola iRacing Series	M80	4	11	5	367	3035	2nd
2025	eNASCAR Coca-Cola iRacing Series	Spire Motorsports	8	12	1	307	3040	1st
2026	eNASCAR Coca-Cola iRacing Championship Series	Spire Motorsports	3	9	0	167	3035	1st
