= 2025 Pacific Office Automation 147 =

25th race of the 2025 NASCAR Xfinity Series

Race details
- Race 25 of 33 of the 2025 NASCAR Xfinity Series
- Date: August 30, 2025
- Location: Portland International Raceway in Portland, Oregon
- Course: Permanent racing facility
- Course length: 1.967 miles (3.166 km)
- Distance: 78 laps, 153 mi (246 km)
- Scheduled distance: 75 laps, 147 mi (237 km)
- Average speed: 66.688 mph (107.324 km/h)

Pole position
Driver	Connor Zilisch	JR Motorsports
- Time: 1:13.380

Most laps led
Driver	Connor Zilisch	JR Motorsports
- Laps: 70

Winner
No. 88	Connor Zilisch	JR Motorsports

Television in the United States
- Network: The CW
- Announcers: Adam Alexander and Parker Kligerman

Radio in the United States
- Radio: MRN

The 2025 Pacific Office Automation 147 was the 25th stock car race of the 2025 NASCAR Xfinity Series, and the fourth and final iteration of the event. The race was held on Saturday, August 30, 2025, at Portland International Raceway in Portland, Oregon, a 1.967 miles (3.166 km) permanent road course. The race was contested over 78 laps, extended from 75 laps due to a green-white-checkered finish.

In an action-packed race, Connor Zilisch, driving for JR Motorsports, would survive a chaotic overtime restart, and continued to dominant on the road courses, winning both stages and led all but 8 laps to earn his ninth career NASCAR Xfinity Series win, his eighth of the season, and his third consecutive win. He also became the highest winning rookie driver in Xfinity Series history. To fill out the podium, William Sawalich, driving for Joe Gibbs Racing, and Nick Sanchez, driving for Big Machine Racing, would finish 2nd and 3rd, respectively.

== Report ==
=== Background ===
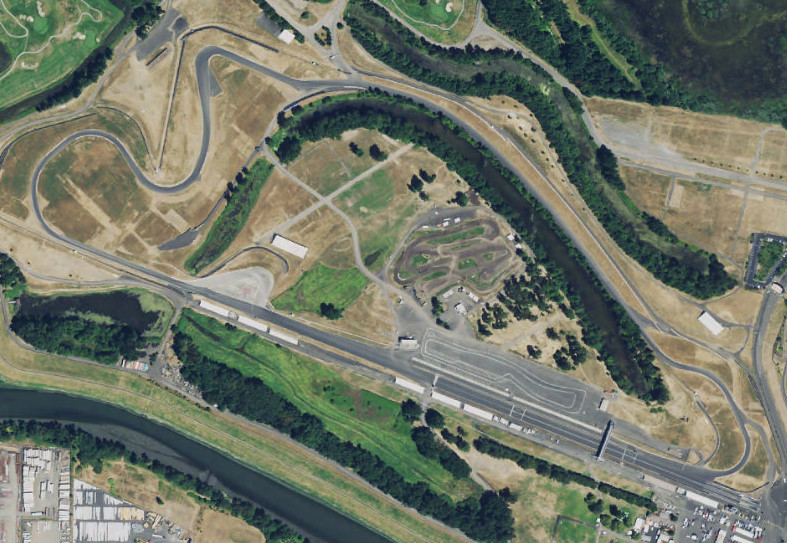
Portland International Raceway, the circuit where the race was held.

Portland International Raceway (PIR) is a motorsport facility in Portland in the U.S. state of Oregon. It is part of the Delta Park complex on the former site of Vanport, just south of the Columbia River. It lies west of the Delta Park/Vanport light rail station and less than a mile west of Interstate 5.

The track hosts the IndyCar Series, Formula E, ICSCC and SCCA and OMRRA road racing, the ARCA Menards Series West, the NASCAR Xfinity Series, and SCCA autocross events. Additionally, the PIR grounds are host to OBRA (Oregon Bicycle Racing Association) bicycling races on the track and the surrounding grounds. The facility includes a dragstrip and a motocross track.

=== Entry list ===
- (R) denotes rookie driver.

#	Driver	Team	Make
00	Sheldon Creed	Haas Factory Team	Ford
1	Carson Kvapil (R)	JR Motorsports	Chevrolet
2	Jesse Love	Richard Childress Racing	Chevrolet
4	Parker Retzlaff	Alpha Prime Racing	Chevrolet
07	Alex Labbé	SS-Green Light Racing	Chevrolet
7	Justin Allgaier	JR Motorsports	Chevrolet
8	Sammy Smith	JR Motorsports	Chevrolet
10	Daniel Dye (R)	Kaulig Racing	Chevrolet
11	Will Brown	Kaulig Racing	Chevrolet
14	Garrett Smithley	SS-Green Light Racing	Chevrolet
16	Christian Eckes (R)	Kaulig Racing	Chevrolet
18	William Sawalich (R)	Joe Gibbs Racing	Toyota
19	Jack Perkins	Joe Gibbs Racing	Toyota
20	Brandon Jones	Joe Gibbs Racing	Toyota
21	Austin Hill	Richard Childress Racing	Chevrolet
24	Alon Day	Sam Hunt Racing	Toyota
25	Harrison Burton	AM Racing	Ford
26	Dean Thompson (R)	Sam Hunt Racing	Toyota
27	Jeb Burton	Jordan Anderson Racing	Chevrolet
28	Joey Hand	RSS Racing	Ford
31	Blaine Perkins	Jordan Anderson Racing	Chevrolet
32	Austin Green	Jordan Anderson Racing	Chevrolet
35	Takuma Koga	Joey Gase Motorsports	Toyota
39	Ryan Sieg	RSS Racing	Ford
41	Sam Mayer	Haas Factory Team	Ford
42	Anthony Alfredo	Young's Motorsports	Chevrolet
44	Brennan Poole	Alpha Prime Racing	Chevrolet
45	Vicente Salas	Alpha Prime Racing	Chevrolet
48	Nick Sanchez (R)	Big Machine Racing	Chevrolet
51	Jeremy Clements	Jeremy Clements Racing	Chevrolet
53	Kyle Sieg	Joey Gase Motorsports	Chevrolet
54	Taylor Gray (R)	Joe Gibbs Racing	Toyota
70	Thomas Annunziata	Cope Family Racing	Chevrolet
71	Ryan Ellis	DGM Racing	Chevrolet
88	Connor Zilisch (R)	JR Motorsports	Chevrolet
91	Josh Williams	DGM Racing	Chevrolet
99	Matt DiBenedetto	Viking Motorsports	Chevrolet
Official entry list

== Practice ==
The first and only practice was held on Saturday, August 30, at 12:00 PM PST, and would last for 50 minutes. Connor Zilisch, driving for JR Motorsports, would set the fastest time in the session, with a lap of 1:13.641, and a speed of 96.305 mph (154.988 km/h).

Pos.	#	Driver	Team	Make	Time	Speed
1	88	Connor Zilisch (R)	JR Motorsports	Chevrolet	1:13.641	96.305
2	2	Jesse Love	Richard Childress Racing	Chevrolet	1:13.868	96.009
3	21	Austin Hill	Richard Childress Racing	Chevrolet	1:14.095	95.715
Full practice results

== Qualifying ==
Qualifying was held on Saturday, August 30, at 1:05 PM PST. Since Portland International Raceway is a road course, the qualifying procedure used is a two-group system, with one round. Drivers will be separated into two groups, A and B. Each driver will have multiple laps to set a time. Whoever sets the fastest time between both groups will win the pole.

Under a 2021 rule change, the timing line in road course qualifying is "not" the start-finish line. Instead, the timing line for qualifying will be set at the exit of Turn 11. Connor Zilisch, driving for JR Motorsports, would score the pole for the race, with a lap of 1:13.380, and a speed of 96.648 mph (155.540 km/h).

No drivers would fail to qualify.

=== Qualifying results ===
Pos.	#	Driver	Team	Make	Time	Speed
1	88	Connor Zilisch (R)	JR Motorsports	Chevrolet	1:13.380	96.648
2	7	Justin Allgaier	JR Motorsports	Chevrolet	1:13.780	96.124
3	21	Austin Hill	Richard Childress Racing	Chevrolet	1:13.797	96.101
4	18	William Sawalich (R)	Joe Gibbs Racing	Toyota	1:13.873	96.003
5	41	Sam Mayer	Haas Factory Team	Ford	1:13.925	95.935
6	24	Alon Day	Sam Hunt Racing	Toyota	1:13.945	95.909
7	48	Nick Sanchez (R)	Big Machine Racing	Chevrolet	1:14.128	95.672
8	8	Sammy Smith	JR Motorsports	Chevrolet	1:14.136	95.662
9	1	Carson Kvapil (R)	JR Motorsports	Chevrolet	1:14.242	95.525
10	2	Jesse Love	Richard Childress Racing	Chevrolet	1:14.271	95.488
11	20	Brandon Jones	Joe Gibbs Racing	Toyota	1:14.329	95.414
12	19	Jack Perkins	Joe Gibbs Racing	Toyota	1:14.339	95.401
13	54	Taylor Gray (R)	Joe Gibbs Racing	Toyota	1:14.426	95.289
14	32	Austin Green	Jordan Anderson Racing	Chevrolet	1:14.432	95.282
15	16	Christian Eckes (R)	Kaulig Racing	Chevrolet	1:14.529	95.158
16	00	Sheldon Creed	Haas Factory Team	Ford	1:14.531	95.155
17	27	Jeb Burton	Jordan Anderson Racing	Chevrolet	1:14.672	94.975
18	25	Harrison Burton	AM Racing	Ford	1:14.706	94.932
19	28	Joey Hand	RSS Racing	Ford	1:14.818	94.790
20	39	Ryan Sieg	RSS Racing	Ford	1:14.838	94.765
21	42	Anthony Alfredo	Young's Motorsports	Chevrolet	1:15.057	94.488
22	26	Dean Thompson (R)	Sam Hunt Racing	Toyota	1:15.084	94.454
23	31	Blaine Perkins	Jordan Anderson Racing	Chevrolet	1:15.233	94.267
24	99	Matt DiBenedetto	Viking Motorsports	Chevrolet	1:15.319	94.160
25	51	Jeremy Clements	Jeremy Clements Racing	Chevrolet	1:15.350	94.121
26	10	Daniel Dye (R)	Kaulig Racing	Chevrolet	1:15.394	94.066
27	11	Will Brown	Kaulig Racing	Chevrolet	1:15.428	94.023
28	44	Brennan Poole	Alpha Prime Racing	Chevrolet	1:15.702	93.683
29	4	Parker Retzlaff	Alpha Prime Racing	Chevrolet	1:15.731	93.647
30	71	Ryan Ellis	DGM Racing	Chevrolet	1:15.751	93.623
31	14	Garrett Smithley	SS-Green Light Racing	Chevrolet	1:15.837	93.516
32	45	Vicente Salas	Alpha Prime Racing	Chevrolet	1:16.049	93.256
Qualified by owner's points
33	91	Josh Williams	DGM Racing	Chevrolet	1:16.194	93.078
34	53	Kyle Sieg	Joey Gase Motorsports	Chevrolet	1:18.397	90.463
35	35	Takuma Koga	Joey Gase Motorsports	Toyota	1:19.130	89.625
36	70	Thomas Annunziata	Cope Family Racing	Chevrolet	–	–
37	07	Alex Labbé	SS-Green Light Racing	Chevrolet	–	–
Official qualifying results
Official starting lineup

== Race results ==
Stage 1 Laps: 25

Pos.	#	Driver	Team	Make	Pts
1	88	Connor Zilisch (R)	JR Motorsports	Chevrolet	10
2	21	Austin Hill	Richard Childress Racing	Chevrolet	9
3	7	Justin Allgaier	JR Motorsports	Chevrolet	8
4	41	Sam Mayer	Haas Factory Team	Ford	7
5	18	William Sawalich (R)	Joe Gibbs Racing	Toyota	6
6	1	Carson Kvapil (R)	JR Motorsports	Chevrolet	5
7	2	Jesse Love	Richard Childress Racing	Chevrolet	4
8	20	Brandon Jones	Joe Gibbs Racing	Toyota	3
9	19	Jack Perkins	Joe Gibbs Racing	Toyota	2
10	00	Sheldon Creed	Haas Factory Team	Ford	1

Stage 2 Laps: 25

Pos.	#	Driver	Team	Make	Pts
1	88	Connor Zilisch (R)	JR Motorsports	Chevrolet	10
2	21	Austin Hill	Richard Childress Racing	Chevrolet	9
3	7	Justin Allgaier	JR Motorsports	Chevrolet	8
4	18	William Sawalich (R)	Joe Gibbs Racing	Toyota	7
5	41	Sam Mayer	Haas Factory Team	Ford	6
6	1	Carson Kvapil (R)	JR Motorsports	Chevrolet	5
7	19	Jack Perkins	Joe Gibbs Racing	Toyota	4
8	20	Brandon Jones	Joe Gibbs Racing	Toyota	3
9	16	Christian Eckes (R)	Kaulig Racing	Chevrolet	2
10	8	Sammy Smith	JR Motorsports	Chevrolet	1

Stage 3 Laps: 28

Fin	St	#	Driver	Team	Make	Laps	Led	Status	Pts
1	1	88	Connor Zilisch (R)	JR Motorsports	Chevrolet	78	70	Running	61
2	4	18	William Sawalich (R)	Joe Gibbs Racing	Toyota	78	0	Running	48
3	7	48	Nick Sanchez (R)	Big Machine Racing	Chevrolet	78	0	Running	34
4	15	16	Christian Eckes (R)	Kaulig Racing	Chevrolet	78	0	Running	35
5	3	21	Austin Hill	Richard Childress Racing	Chevrolet	78	8	Running	50
6	9	1	Carson Kvapil (R)	JR Motorsports	Chevrolet	78	0	Running	41
7	17	27	Jeb Burton	Jordan Anderson Racing	Chevrolet	78	0	Running	30
8	14	32	Austin Green	Jordan Anderson Racing	Chevrolet	78	0	Running	29
9	23	31	Blaine Perkins	Jordan Anderson Racing	Chevrolet	78	0	Running	28
10	10	2	Jesse Love	Richard Childress Racing	Chevrolet	78	0	Running	31
11	26	10	Daniel Dye (R)	Kaulig Racing	Chevrolet	78	0	Running	26
12	18	25	Harrison Burton	AM Racing	Ford	78	0	Running	25
13	28	44	Brennan Poole	Alpha Prime Racing	Chevrolet	78	0	Running	24
14	13	54	Taylor Gray (R)	Joe Gibbs Racing	Toyota	78	0	Running	23
15	2	7	Justin Allgaier	JR Motorsports	Chevrolet	78	0	Running	38
16	5	41	Sam Mayer	Haas Factory Team	Ford	78	0	Running	34
17	25	51	Jeremy Clements	Jeremy Clements Racing	Chevrolet	78	0	Running	20
18	11	20	Brandon Jones	Joe Gibbs Racing	Toyota	78	0	Running	25
19	19	28	Joey Hand	RSS Racing	Ford	78	0	Running	18
20	6	24	Alon Day	Sam Hunt Racing	Toyota	78	0	Running	17
21	30	71	Ryan Ellis	DGM Racing	Chevrolet	78	0	Running	16
22	8	8	Sammy Smith	JR Motorsports	Chevrolet	78	0	Running	16
23	33	91	Josh Williams	DGM Racing	Chevrolet	78	0	Running	14
24	20	39	Ryan Sieg	RSS Racing	Ford	78	0	Running	13
25	31	14	Garrett Smithley	SS-Green Light Racing	Chevrolet	78	0	Running	12
26	34	53	Kyle Sieg	Joey Gase Motorsports	Chevrolet	78	0	Running	11
27	16	00	Sheldon Creed	Haas Factory Team	Ford	78	0	Running	11
28	36	70	Thomas Annunziata	Cope Family Racing	Chevrolet	78	0	Running	9
29	35	35	Takuma Koga	Joey Gase Motorsports	Toyota	75	0	Running	8
30	29	4	Parker Retzlaff	Alpha Prime Racing	Chevrolet	74	0	Electrical	7
31	12	19	Jack Perkins	Joe Gibbs Racing	Toyota	71	0	Suspension	12
32	22	26	Dean Thompson (R)	Sam Hunt Racing	Toyota	71	0	Running	5
33	21	42	Anthony Alfredo	Young's Motorsports	Chevrolet	63	0	Transmission	4
34	24	99	Matt DiBenedetto	Viking Motorsports	Chevrolet	56	0	Suspension	3
35	27	11	Will Brown	Kaulig Racing	Chevrolet	49	0	Suspension	2
36	37	07	Alex Labbé	SS-Green Light Racing	Chevrolet	49	0	Fuel Pump	1
37	32	45	Vicente Salas	Alpha Prime Racing	Chevrolet	43	0	Running	1
Official race results

== Standings after the race ==
Drivers' Championship standings

	Pos	Driver	Points
1	1	Connor Zilisch	924
1	2	Justin Allgaier	904 (–20)
	3	Sam Mayer	874 (–50)
	4	Jesse Love	804 (–120)
	5	Austin Hill	766 (–158)
	6	Carson Kvapil	728 (–196)
	7	Brandon Jones	709 (–215)
1	8	Sammy Smith	664 (–260)
1	9	Sheldon Creed	662 (–262)
	10	Taylor Gray	657 (–267)
	11	Harrison Burton	628 (–296)
	12	Nick Sanchez	603 (–321)
Official driver's standings

Manufacturers' Championship standings

	Pos	Manufacturer	Points
	1	Chevrolet	980
1	2	Toyota	806 (–174)
1	3	Ford	798 (–182)

- Note: Only the first 12 positions are included for the driver standings.

Previous race: 2025 Wawa 250	NASCAR Xfinity Series; 2025 season	Next race: 2025 Nu Way 200
