= 2025 North Carolina Education Lottery 250 =

10th race of the 2025 NASCAR Xfinity Series

Race details
- Race 10 of 33 of the 2025 NASCAR Xfinity Series
- Date: April 19, 2025
- Location: Rockingham Speedway in Rockingham, North Carolina
- Course: Permanent racing facility
- Course length: 0.94 miles (1.51 km)
- Distance: 256 laps, 240 mi (386 km)
- Scheduled distance: 250 laps, 235 mi (378 km)
- Average speed: 80.377 mph (129.354 km/h)

Pole position
Driver	Connor Zilisch	JR Motorsports
- Time: 22.630

Most laps led
Driver	Ryan Sieg	RSS Racing
- Laps: 77

Winner
No. 8	Sammy Smith	JR Motorsports

Television in the United States
- Network: The CW
- Announcers: Adam Alexander, Jamie McMurray, and Parker Kligerman

Radio in the United States
- Radio: MRN

The 2025 North Carolina Education Lottery 250 was the 10th stock car race of the 2025 NASCAR Xfinity Series, and the 1st iteration of the event. The race was held on Saturday, April 19, 2025, at Rockingham Speedway in Rockingham, North Carolina, a 0.94 miles (1.51 km) permanent oval shaped racetrack. The race was originally scheduled to be contested over 250 laps, but was increased to 256 laps due to an overtime restart.

In an action-packed and wreck-filled race, Sammy Smith, driving for JR Motorsports, would be given the victory following post-race inspection, after the original winner of the race, Jesse Love, was disqualified for a rear suspension violation, and was credited with a 37th-place finish. This was Smith's third career NASCAR Xfinity Series win, and his first of the season. Ryan Sieg led a race-high and career-high 77 laps, before being involved in a late-race incident and finishing 18th. Following the DQ, Parker Retzlaff earned a career-best second-place finish with Alpha Prime Racing, and Harrison Burton, driving for AM Racing, rounded out the rest of the podium.

This was the first Xfinity Series race to be held at Rockingham since 2004, the return of Kasey Kahne in a NASCAR-sanctioned race since 2018, and the fourth and final race of the Dash 4 Cash. Drivers eligible for the D4C were Carson Kvapil, Justin Allgaier, Sammy Smith, and Brandon Jones, since they were the highest finishing Xfinity regulars following the race at Bristol. Smith was given the race win and claimed the $100K bonus cash.

== Entry list ==
- (R) denotes rookie driver.
- (i) denotes driver who is ineligible for series driver points.

#	Driver	Team	Make
00	Sheldon Creed	Haas Factory Team	Ford
1	Carson Kvapil (R)	JR Motorsports	Chevrolet
2	Jesse Love	Richard Childress Racing	Chevrolet
4	Parker Retzlaff	Alpha Prime Racing	Chevrolet
5	Kris Wright	Our Motorsports	Chevrolet
07	Patrick Emerling	SS-Green Light Racing	Chevrolet
7	Justin Allgaier	JR Motorsports	Chevrolet
8	Sammy Smith	JR Motorsports	Chevrolet
10	Daniel Dye (R)	Kaulig Racing	Chevrolet
11	Josh Williams	Kaulig Racing	Chevrolet
14	Garrett Smithley	SS-Green Light Racing	Chevrolet
16	Christian Eckes (R)	Kaulig Racing	Chevrolet
18	William Sawalich (R)	Joe Gibbs Racing	Toyota
19	Justin Bonsignore	Joe Gibbs Racing	Toyota
20	Brandon Jones	Joe Gibbs Racing	Toyota
21	Austin Hill	Richard Childress Racing	Chevrolet
25	Harrison Burton	AM Racing	Ford
26	Dean Thompson (R)	Sam Hunt Racing	Toyota
27	Jeb Burton	Jordan Anderson Racing	Chevrolet
28	Kyle Sieg	RSS Racing	Ford
31	Blaine Perkins	Jordan Anderson Racing	Chevrolet
32	Katherine Legge (i)	Jordan Anderson Racing	Chevrolet
33	Kasey Kahne	Richard Childress Racing	Chevrolet
35	Greg Van Alst	Joey Gase Motorsports	Chevrolet
39	Ryan Sieg	RSS Racing	Ford
41	Sam Mayer	Haas Factory Team	Ford
42	Anthony Alfredo	Young's Motorsports	Chevrolet
44	Brennan Poole	Alpha Prime Racing	Chevrolet
45	Vicente Salas	Alpha Prime Racing	Chevrolet
48	Nick Sanchez (R)	Big Machine Racing	Chevrolet
51	Jeremy Clements	Jeremy Clements Racing	Chevrolet
53	J. J. Yeley (i)	Joey Gase Motorsports	Chevrolet
54	Taylor Gray (R)	Joe Gibbs Racing	Toyota
70	Thomas Annunziata	Cope Family Racing	Chevrolet
71	Ryan Ellis	DGM Racing	Chevrolet
74	Dawson Cram	Mike Harmon Racing	Chevrolet
87	Austin Green	Jordan Anderson Racing	Chevrolet
88	Connor Zilisch (R)	JR Motorsports	Chevrolet
91	Josh Bilicki	DGM Racing	Chevrolet
99	Matt DiBenedetto	Viking Motorsports	Chevrolet
Official entry list

== Practice ==
The first and only practice session was held on Friday, April 18, at 3:05 PM EST, and would last for 50 minutes. Carson Kvapil, driving for JR Motorsports, would set the fastest time in the session, with a lap of 22.899, and a speed of 147.779 mph (237.827 km/h).

Pos.	#	Driver	Team	Make	Time	Speed
1	1	Carson Kvapil (R)	JR Motorsports	Chevrolet	22.899	147.779
2	88	Connor Zilisch (R)	JR Motorsports	Chevrolet	23.052	146.799
3	00	Sheldon Creed	Haas Factory Team	Ford	23.061	146.741
Full practice results

== Qualifying ==
Qualifying was held on Saturday, April 19, at 12:00 PM EST. Since Rockingham Speedway is a mile oval, the qualifying system used is a single-car, single-lap system with one round. Drivers will be on track by themselves and will have one lap to post a qualifying time, and whoever sets the fastest time will win the pole.

Connor Zilisch, driving for JR Motorsports, would score the pole for the race, with a lap of 22.630, and a speed of 149.536 mph (240.655 km/h). However, after getting a flat tire during his run, he will start at the rear of the field.

Dawson Cram was the only driver who failed to qualify. Katherine Legge, who originally failed to qualify, would move to the No. 53 for Joey Gase Motorsports, replacing J. J. Yeley.

=== Qualifying results ===
Pos.	#	Driver	Team	Make	Time	Speed
1	88	Connor Zilisch (R)	JR Motorsports	Chevrolet	22.630	149.536
2	4	Parker Retzlaff	Alpha Prime Racing	Chevrolet	22.631	149.529
3	48	Nick Sanchez (R)	Big Machine Racing	Chevrolet	22.683	149.187
4	33	Kasey Kahne	Richard Childress Racing	Chevrolet	22.720	148.944
5	18	William Sawalich (R)	Joe Gibbs Racing	Toyota	22.733	148.858
6	20	Brandon Jones	Joe Gibbs Racing	Toyota	22.753	148.728
7	2	Jesse Love	Richard Childress Racing	Chevrolet	22.769	148.623
8	7	Justin Allgaier	JR Motorsports	Chevrolet	22.806	148.382
9	16	Christian Eckes (R)	Kaulig Racing	Chevrolet	22.825	148.258
10	21	Austin Hill	Richard Childress Racing	Chevrolet	22.842	148.148
11	41	Sam Mayer	Haas Factory Team	Ford	22.881	147.896
12	39	Ryan Sieg	RSS Racing	Ford	22.888	147.850
13	8	Sammy Smith	JR Motorsports	Chevrolet	22.894	147.812
14	99	Matt DiBenedetto	Viking Motorsports	Chevrolet	22.931	147.573
15	54	Taylor Gray (R)	Joe Gibbs Racing	Toyota	22.981	147.252
16	51	Jeremy Clements	Jeremy Clements Racing	Chevrolet	22.984	147.233
17	00	Sheldon Creed	Haas Factory Team	Ford	22.996	147.156
18	26	Dean Thompson (R)	Sam Hunt Racing	Toyota	23.010	147.066
19	19	Justin Bonsignore	Joe Gibbs Racing	Toyota	23.015	147.035
20	70	Thomas Annunziata	Cope Family Racing	Chevrolet	23.017	147.022
21	11	Josh Williams	Kaulig Racing	Chevrolet	23.019	147.009
22	27	Jeb Burton	Jordan Anderson Racing	Chevrolet	23.072	146.671
23	71	Ryan Ellis	DGM Racing	Chevrolet	23.104	146.468
24	31	Blaine Perkins	Jordan Anderson Racing	Chevrolet	23.104	146.468
25	1	Carson Kvapil (R)	JR Motorsports	Chevrolet	23.151	146.171
26	91	Josh Bilicki	DGM Racing	Chevrolet	23.165	146.082
27	10	Daniel Dye (R)	Kaulig Racing	Chevrolet	23.167	146.070
28	44	Brennan Poole	Alpha Prime Racing	Chevrolet	23.231	145.667
29	25	Harrison Burton	AM Racing	Ford	23.272	145.411
30	5	Kris Wright	Our Motorsports	Chevrolet	23.280	145.361
31	53	J. J. Yeley (i)	Joey Gase Motorsports	Chevrolet	23.289	145.305
32	87	Austin Green	Jordan Anderson Racing	Chevrolet	23.304	145.211
Qualified by owner's points
33	14	Garrett Smithley	SS-Green Light Racing	Chevrolet	23.324	145.087
34	42	Anthony Alfredo	Young's Motorsports	Chevrolet	23.368	144.813
35	28	Kyle Sieg	RSS Racing	Ford	23.449	144.313
36	45	Vicente Salas	Alpha Prime Racing	Chevrolet	23.507	143.957
37	07	Patrick Emerling	SS-Green Light Racing	Chevrolet	23.703	142.767
38	35	Greg Van Alst	Joey Gase Motorsports	Chevrolet	24.713	136.932
Failed to qualify
39	32	Katherine Legge (i)	Jordan Anderson Racing	Chevrolet	23.397	144.634
40	74	Dawson Cram	Mike Harmon Racing	Chevrolet	23.590	143.451
Official qualifying results
Official starting lineup

== Race results ==
Stage 1 Laps: 60

Pos.	#	Driver	Team	Make	Pts
1	48	Nick Sanchez (R)	Big Machine Racing	Chevrolet	10
2	4	Parker Retzlaff	Alpha Prime Racing	Chevrolet	9
3	39	Ryan Sieg	RSS Racing	Ford	8
4	42	Anthony Alfredo	Young's Motorsports	Chevrolet	7
5	27	Jeb Burton	Jordan Anderson Racing	Chevrolet	6
6	28	Kyle Sieg	RSS Racing	Ford	5
7	1	Carson Kvapil (R)	JR Motorsports	Chevrolet	4
8	99	Matt DiBenedetto	Viking Motorsports	Chevrolet	3
9	51	Jeremy Clements	Jeremy Clements Racing	Chevrolet	2
10	20	Brandon Jones	Joe Gibbs Racing	Toyota	1

Stage 2 Laps: 60

Pos.	#	Driver	Team	Make	Pts
1	26	Dean Thompson (R)	Sam Hunt Racing	Toyota	10
2	27	Jeb Burton	Jordan Anderson Racing	Chevrolet	9
3	51	Jeremy Clements	Jeremy Clements Racing	Chevrolet	8
4	99	Matt DiBenedetto	Viking Motorsports	Chevrolet	7
5	42	Anthony Alfredo	Young's Motorsports	Chevrolet	6
6	20	Brandon Jones	Joe Gibbs Racing	Toyota	5
7	1	Carson Kvapil (R)	JR Motorsports	Chevrolet	4
8	28	Kyle Sieg	RSS Racing	Ford	3
9	54	Taylor Gray (R)	Joe Gibbs Racing	Toyota	2
10	41	Sam Mayer	Haas Factory Team	Ford	1

Stage 3 Laps: 136

Fin	St	#	Driver	Team	Make	Laps	Led	Status	Pts
1	13	8	Sammy Smith	JR Motorsports	Chevrolet	256	9	Running	40
2	2	4	Parker Retzlaff	Alpha Prime Racing	Chevrolet	256	0	Running	44
3	29	25	Harrison Burton	AM Racing	Ford	256	0	Running	34
4	28	44	Brennan Poole	Alpha Prime Racing	Chevrolet	256	0	Running	33
5	15	54	Taylor Gray (R)	Joe Gibbs Racing	Toyota	256	0	Running	34
6	10	21	Austin Hill	Richard Childress Racing	Chevrolet	256	0	Running	31
7	21	11	Josh Williams	Kaulig Racing	Chevrolet	256	0	Running	30
8	22	27	Jeb Burton	Jordan Anderson Racing	Chevrolet	256	0	Running	44
9	27	10	Daniel Dye (R)	Kaulig Racing	Chevrolet	256	0	Running	28
10	16	51	Jeremy Clements	Jeremy Clements Racing	Chevrolet	256	0	Running	37
11	18	26	Dean Thompson (R)	Sam Hunt Racing	Toyota	256	11	Running	36
12	6	20	Brandon Jones	Joe Gibbs Racing	Toyota	256	6	Running	31
13	1	88	Connor Zilisch (R)	JR Motorsports	Chevrolet	256	0	Running	24
14	4	33	Kasey Kahne	Richard Childress Racing	Chevrolet	256	0	Running	23
15	34	42	Anthony Alfredo	Young's Motorsports	Chevrolet	256	0	Running	35
16	25	1	Carson Kvapil (R)	JR Motorsports	Chevrolet	256	47	Running	29
17	26	91	Josh Bilicki	DGM Racing	Chevrolet	256	0	Running	20
18	12	39	Ryan Sieg	RSS Racing	Ford	256	77	Running	27
19	37	07	Patrick Emerling	SS-Green Light Racing	Chevrolet	256	0	Running	18
20	35	28	Kyle Sieg	RSS Racing	Ford	256	0	Running	25
21	8	7	Justin Allgaier	JR Motorsports	Chevrolet	254	0	Running	16
22	33	14	Garrett Smithley	SS-Green Light Racing	Chevrolet	253	0	Running	15
23	9	16	Christian Eckes (R)	Kaulig Racing	Chevrolet	252	1	Running	14
24	36	45	Vicente Salas	Alpha Prime Racing	Chevrolet	251	0	Running	13
25	5	18	William Sawalich (R)	Joe Gibbs Racing	Toyota	248	0	Running	12
26	11	41	Sam Mayer	Haas Factory Team	Ford	247	0	Accident	12
27	14	99	Matt DiBenedetto	Viking Motorsports	Chevrolet	247	0	Accident	20
28	30	5	Kris Wright	Our Motorsports	Chevrolet	247	0	Accident	9
29	20	70	Thomas Annunziata	Cope Family Racing	Chevrolet	246	0	Suspension	8
30	32	87	Austin Green	Jordan Anderson Racing	Chevrolet	241	0	Accident	7
31	3	48	Nick Sanchez (R)	Big Machine Racing	Chevrolet	240	52	Accident	16
32	24	31	Blaine Perkins	Jordan Anderson Racing	Chevrolet	226	0	Accident	5
33	23	71	Ryan Ellis	DGM Racing	Chevrolet	180	0	Accident	4
34	38	35	Greg Van Alst	Joey Gase Motorsports	Chevrolet	171	0	Brakes	3
35	17	00	Sheldon Creed	Haas Factory Team	Ford	109	0	Accident	2
36	31	53	Katherine Legge (i)	Joey Gase Motorsports	Chevrolet	50	0	Accident	0
DSQ	7	2	Jesse Love	Richard Childress Racing	Chevrolet	256	53	Running	2
DSQ	19	19	Justin Bonsignore	Joe Gibbs Racing	Toyota	157	0	Accident	1
Official race results

== Standings after the race ==
Drivers' Championship standings

	Pos	Driver	Points
	1	Justin Allgaier	411
	2	Sam Mayer	324 (–87)
1	3	Austin Hill	311 (–100)
1	4	Jesse Love	288 (–123)
1	5	Carson Kvapil	286 (–125)
1	6	Brandon Jones	284 (–127)
2	7	Connor Zilisch	284 (–127)
2	8	Sammy Smith	281 (–130)
	9	Ryan Sieg	277 (–134)
2	10	Sheldon Creed	254 (–157)
2	11	Jeb Burton	251 (–160)
	12	Harrison Burton	243 (–168)
Official driver's standings

Manufacturers' Championship standings

Pos	Manufacturer	Points
1	Chevrolet	390
2	Toyota	336 (–54)
3	Ford	322 (–68)

- Note: Only the first 12 positions are included for the driver standings.

Previous race: 2025 SciAps 300	NASCAR Xfinity Series; 2025 season	Next race: 2025 Ag-Pro 300
