= 2026 FaithFest 250 =

NASCAR Craftsman Truck Series race at North Wilkesboro Speedway

2026 FaithFest 250 presented by Mercer Transportation
Race details
- Race 15 of 25 in the 2026 NASCAR Craftsman Truck Series
- Date: July 18, 2026
- Location: North Wilkesboro Speedway in North Wilkesboro, North Carolina
- Course: Permanent racing facility
- Course length: 0.625 miles (1.006 km)
- Distance: 250 laps, 156.25 mi (251.46 km)
- Average speed: 91.627 miles per hour (147.459 km/h)

Pole position
Driver	Layne Riggs	Front Row Motorsports
- Time: 18.502

Most laps led
Driver	Chandler Smith	Front Row Motorsports
- Laps: 105

Fastest lap
Driver	Chandler Smith	Front Row Motorsports
- Time: 19.148

Winner
No. 38	Chandler Smith	Front Row Motorsports

Television in the United States
- Network: FS1
- Announcers: Brent Stover, Michael Waltrip, and Todd Bodine

Radio in the United States
- Radio: NRN
- Booth announcers: Brad Gillie, Nick Yeoman, and Ross Chastain
- Turn announcers: Pat Patterson (Turns 3–4)

The 2026 FaithFest 250 presented by Mercer Transportation was a NASCAR Craftsman Truck Series race held on Saturday, July 18, 2026, at North Wilkesboro Speedway in North Wilkesboro, North Carolina. Contested over 250 laps on the 0.625-mile-long (1.006 km) asphalt short track, it was the 15th race of the 2026 NASCAR Craftsman Truck Series season, and the fourth running of the event.

Chandler Smith, driving for Front Row Motorsports, pulled off a dominating performance in the final stage, leading the final 105 laps to earn his ninth career NASCAR Craftsman Truck Series win, his second of the season, and his second consecutive win at North Wilkesboro. Layne Riggs won the first stage, leading 25 laps, while Ty Majeski won the second stage, leading 23 laps. At race's end, Riggs finished second to give FRM a 1-2 finish, and Shane van Gisbergen finished third. Christian Eckes and Landen Lewis rounded out the top five, while Gio Ruggiero, Chase Elliott, Stewart Friesen, Corey Heim, and Majeski rounded out the top ten.

== Report ==
=== Background ===
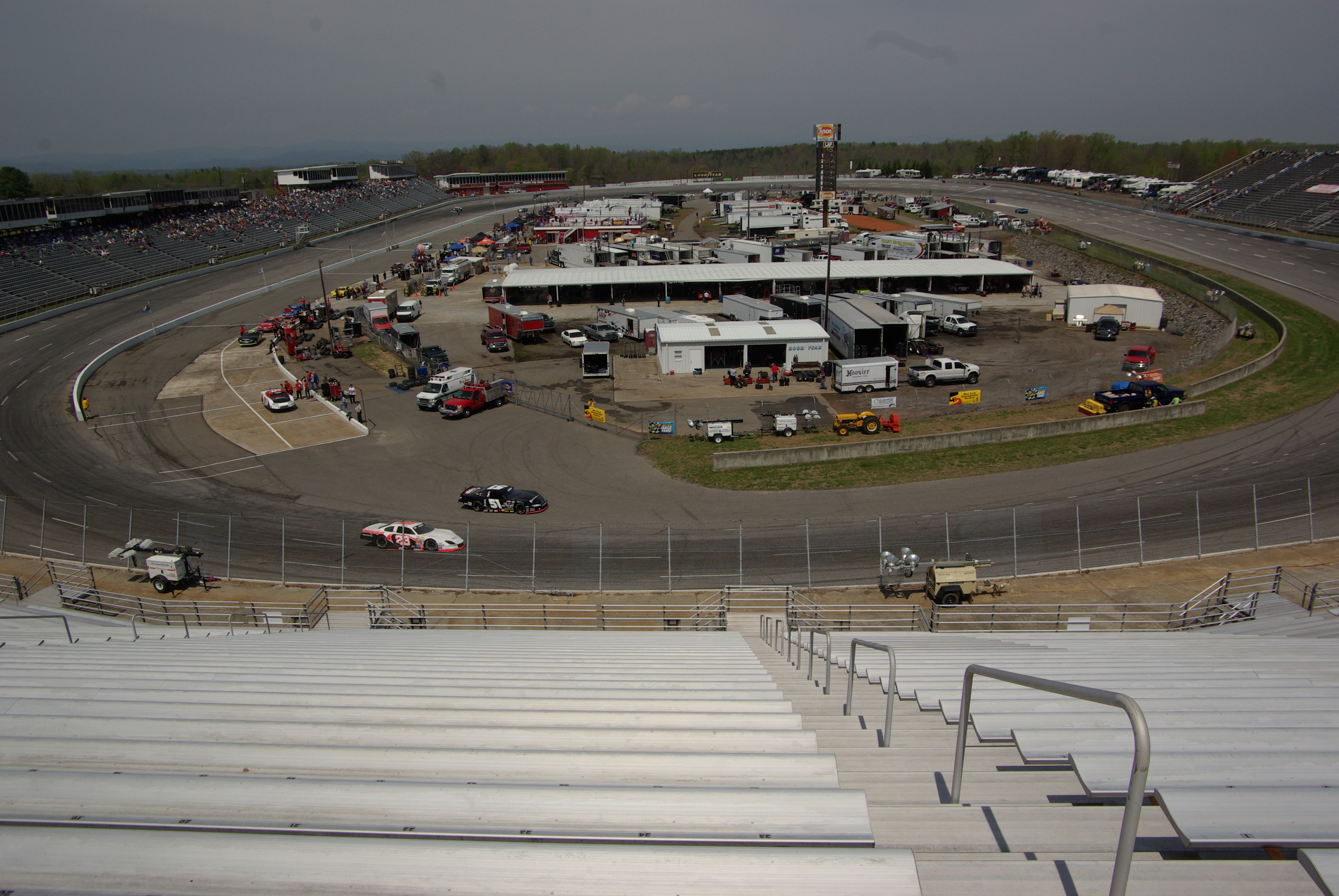
North Wilkesboro Speedway, the track where the race was held.

North Wilkesboro Speedway is a 0.625 miles (1.006 km) paved oval short track in North Wilkesboro, North Carolina. The track has hosted a variety of racing events since its inaugural season of racing in 1947; primarily races sanctioned by NASCAR. It has been owned by Speedway Motorsports, LLC (SMI) since 2007 with Ronald Queen serving as director of operations. North Wilkesboro Speedway is served by U.S. Route 421.

The track has currently a capacity of 25,000 as of 2023, down from its peak of 60,000 in 1996. NWS retains a vintage aesthetic from the 1990s as part of an effort to preserve the historical value of the track. As a result, the facility retains some of its original buildings built before the track's first closure in 1996, including buildings featuring Winston Cigarettes sponsorship and suites built in the 1980s. Developers in recent years have also added other amenities as part of a revival effort that started in 2022.

On April 23, 2026, it was announced that FaithFest, a Christian music festival in the North Wilkesboro area, along with North Carolina trucking company Mercer Transportation, would assume naming rights for the 2026 race.

==== Entry list ====
- (R) denotes rookie driver.
- (i) denotes driver who is ineligible for series driver points.

#	Driver	Team	Make
1	Nick Leitz	Tricon Garage	Toyota
2	Luke Baldwin	Team Reaume	Ford
4	Donovan Strauss	Niece Motorsports	Chevrolet
5	Corey Heim	Tricon Garage	Toyota
7 (Note: previously scheduled to be Kyle Busch)	Chase Elliott (i)	Spire Motorsports	Chevrolet
9	Grant Enfinger	CR7 Motorsports	Chevrolet
10	Corey LaJoie	Kaulig Racing	Ram
11	Kaden Honeycutt	Tricon Garage	Toyota
12	Brenden Queen (R)	Kaulig Racing	Ram
13	Cole Butcher (R)	ThorSport Racing	Ford
14	Mini Tyrrell (R)	Kaulig Racing	Ram
15	Tanner Gray	Tricon Garage	Toyota
16	Justin Haley	Kaulig Racing	Ram
17	Gio Ruggiero	Tricon Garage	Toyota
18	Tyler Ankrum	McAnally–Hilgemann Racing	Chevrolet
19	Daniel Hemric	McAnally–Hilgemann Racing	Chevrolet
22	Clayton Green	Team Reaume	Ford
25	Ryan Newman	Kaulig Racing	Ram
26	Dawson Sutton	Rackley W.A.R.	Chevrolet
27	Kasey Kleyn	Rackley W.A.R.	Chevrolet
33	Frankie Muniz	Team Reaume	Ford
34	Layne Riggs	Front Row Motorsports	Ford
38	Chandler Smith	Front Row Motorsports	Ford
42	Tyler Reif	Niece Motorsports	Chevrolet
44	Andrés Pérez de Lara	Niece Motorsports	Chevrolet
45	Landen Lewis	Niece Motorsports	Chevrolet
52	Stewart Friesen	Halmar Friesen Racing	Toyota
56	Timmy Hill	Hill Motorsports	Toyota
62	Christopher Bell (i)	Halmar Friesen Racing	Toyota
71	Shane van Gisbergen (i)	Spire Motorsports	Chevrolet
75	Landon Huffman	Henderson Motorsports	Chevrolet
76	Nathan Nicholson	Freedom Racing Enterprises	Chevrolet
77	Carson Hocevar (i)	Spire Motorsports	Chevrolet
81	Kris Wright	McAnally–Hilgemann Racing	Chevrolet
88	Ty Majeski	ThorSport Racing	Ford
91	Christian Eckes	McAnally–Hilgemann Racing	Chevrolet
98	Jake Garcia	ThorSport Racing	Ford
99	Ben Rhodes	ThorSport Racing	Ford
Official entry list

== Practice ==
The first and only practice session was held on Friday, July 17, at 2:00 PM EST, and lasted for 50 minutes.

Carson Hocevar, driving for Spire Motorsports, set the fastest time in the session, with a lap of 18.639 seconds, and a speed of 120.715 miles per hour (194.272 km/h).

Pos.	#	Driver	Team	Make	Time	Speed
1	77	Carson Hocevar (i)	Spire Motorsports	Chevrolet	18.639	120.715
2	62	Christopher Bell (i)	Halmar Friesen Racing	Toyota	18.643	120.689
3	11	Kaden Honeycutt	Tricon Garage	Toyota	18.716	120.218
Full practice results

== Qualifying ==
Qualifying was held on Friday, July 17, at 3:05 PM EST. Since North Wilkesboro Speedway is a short track, the qualifying procedure used was a single-car, two-lap system with one round. Drivers were on track by themselves and had two laps to post a qualifying time, and whoever set the fastest time won the pole.

Layne Riggs, driving for Front Row Motorsports, qualified on pole position with a lap of 18.502 seconds, and a speed of 121.608 miles per hour (195.709 km/h).

Two drivers failed to qualify: Landon Huffman and Timmy Hill.

=== Qualifying results ===
Pos.	#	Driver	Team	Make	Time	Speed
1	34	Layne Riggs	Front Row Motorsports	Ford	18.502	121.608
2	77	Carson Hocevar (i)	Spire Motorsports	Chevrolet	18.518	121.503
3	62	Christopher Bell (i)	Halmar Friesen Racing	Toyota	18.571	121.157
4	5	Corey Heim	Tricon Garage	Toyota	18.608	120.916
5	17	Gio Ruggiero	Tricon Garage	Toyota	18.615	120.870
6	7	Chase Elliott (i)	Spire Motorsports	Chevrolet	18.627	120.792
7	11	Kaden Honeycutt	Tricon Garage	Toyota	18.658	120.592
8	9	Grant Enfinger	CR7 Motorsports	Chevrolet	18.668	120.527
9	38	Chandler Smith	Front Row Motorsports	Ford	18.697	120.340
10	52	Stewart Friesen	Halmar Friesen Racing	Toyota	18.702	120.308
11	13	Cole Butcher (R)	ThorSport Racing	Ford	18.721	120.186
12	1	Nick Leitz	Tricon Garage	Toyota	18.734	120.102
13	16	Justin Haley	Kaulig Racing	Ram	18.753	119.981
14	15	Tanner Gray	Tricon Garage	Toyota	18.791	119.738
15	98	Jake Garcia	ThorSport Racing	Ford	18.807	119.636
16	45	Landen Lewis	Niece Motorsports	Chevrolet	18.839	119.433
17	26	Dawson Sutton	Rackley W.A.R.	Chevrolet	18.857	119.319
18	91	Christian Eckes	McAnally–Hilgemann Racing	Chevrolet	18.858	119.313
19	71	Shane van Gisbergen (i)	Spire Motorsports	Chevrolet	18.859	119.306
20	44	Andrés Pérez de Lara	Niece Motorsports	Chevrolet	18.868	119.250
21	19	Daniel Hemric	McAnally–Hilgemann Racing	Chevrolet	18.871	119.231
22	99	Ben Rhodes	ThorSport Racing	Ford	18.894	119.085
23	12	Brenden Queen (R)	Kaulig Racing	Ram	18.894	119.085
24	18	Tyler Ankrum	McAnally–Hilgemann Racing	Chevrolet	18.896	119.073
25	25	Ryan Newman	Kaulig Racing	Ram	18.910	118.985
26	81	Kris Wright	McAnally–Hilgemann Racing	Chevrolet	18.978	118.558
27	88	Ty Majeski	ThorSport Racing	Ford	18.998	118.434
28	14	Mini Tyrrell (R)	Kaulig Racing	Ram	19.019	118.303
29	2	Luke Baldwin	Team Reaume	Ford	19.101	117.795
30	42	Tyler Reif	Niece Motorsports	Chevrolet	19.119	117.684
31	27	Kasey Kleyn	Rackley W.A.R.	Chevrolet	19.123	117.659
Qualified by owner's points
32	4	Donovan Strauss	Niece Motorsports	Chevrolet	19.221	117.059
33	76	Nathan Nicholson	Freedom Racing Enterprises	Chevrolet	19.260	116.822
34	10	Corey LaJoie	Kaulig Racing	Ram	19.401	115.973
35	22	Clayton Green	Team Reaume	Ford	19.550	115.090
36	33	Frankie Muniz	Team Reaume	Ford	19.619	114.685
Failed to qualify
37	75	Landon Huffman	Henderson Motorsports	Chevrolet	19.496	115.408
38	56	Timmy Hill	Hill Motorsports	Toyota	—	—
Official qualifying results
Official starting lineup

== Race ==
=== Race results ===
==== Stage Results ====
Stage One Laps: 70

Pos.	#	Driver	Team	Make	Pts
1	34	Layne Riggs	Front Row Motorsports	Ford	10
2	77	Carson Hocevar (i)	Spire Motorsports	Chevrolet	0
3	38	Chandler Smith	Front Row Motorsports	Ford	8
4	62	Christopher Bell (i)	Halmar Friesen Racing	Toyota	0
5	7	Chase Elliott (i)	Spire Motorsports	Chevrolet	0
6	5	Corey Heim	Tricon Garage	Toyota	5
7	11	Kaden Honeycutt	Tricon Garage	Toyota	4
8	91	Christian Eckes	McAnally–Hilgemann Racing	Chevrolet	3
9	17	Gio Ruggiero	Tricon Garage	Toyota	2
10	9	Grant Enfinger	CR7 Motorsports	Chevrolet	1

Stage Two Laps: 70

Pos.	#	Driver	Team	Make	Pts
1	88	Ty Majeski	ThorSport Racing	Ford	10
2	38	Chandler Smith	Front Row Motorsports	Ford	9
3	99	Ben Rhodes	ThorSport Racing	Ford	8
4	91	Christian Eckes	McAnally–Hilgemann Racing	Chevrolet	7
5	52	Stewart Friesen	Halmar Friesen Racing	Toyota	6
6	19	Daniel Hemric	McAnally–Hilgemann Racing	Chevrolet	5
7	44	Andrés Pérez de Lara	Niece Motorsports	Chevrolet	4
8	17	Gio Ruggiero	Tricon Garage	Toyota	3
9	5	Corey Heim	Tricon Garage	Toyota	2
10	7	Chase Elliott (i)	Spire Motorsports	Chevrolet	0

=== Final Stage Results ===
Stage Three Laps: 110

Fin	St	#	Driver	Team	Make	Laps	Led	Status	Pts
1	9	38	Chandler Smith	Front Row Motorsports	Ford	250	105	Running	73
2	1	34	Layne Riggs	Front Row Motorsports	Ford	250	25	Running	45
3	19	71	Shane van Gisbergen (i)	Spire Motorsports	Chevrolet	250	0	Running	0
4	18	91	Christian Eckes	McAnally–Hilgemann Racing	Chevrolet	250	0	Running	43
5	16	45	Landen Lewis	Niece Motorsports	Chevrolet	250	0	Running	32
6	5	17	Gio Ruggiero	Tricon Garage	Toyota	250	0	Running	36
7	6	7	Chase Elliott (i)	Spire Motorsports	Chevrolet	250	1	Running	0
8	10	52	Stewart Friesen	Halmar Friesen Racing	Toyota	250	0	Running	35
9	4	5	Corey Heim	Tricon Garage	Toyota	250	0	Running	35
10	27	88	Ty Majeski	ThorSport Racing	Ford	250	23	Running	37
11	7	11	Kaden Honeycutt	Tricon Garage	Toyota	249	0	Running	30
12	30	42	Tyler Reif	Niece Motorsports	Chevrolet	249	0	Running	25
13	15	98	Jake Garcia	ThorSport Racing	Ford	249	22	Running	24
14	22	99	Ben Rhodes	ThorSport Racing	Ford	249	0	Running	31
15	3	62	Christopher Bell (i)	Halmar Friesen Racing	Toyota	249	0	Running	0
16	17	26	Dawson Sutton	Rackley W.A.R.	Chevrolet	249	0	Running	21
17	12	1	Nick Leitz	Tricon Garage	Toyota	249	0	Running	20
18	14	15	Tanner Gray	Tricon Garage	Toyota	249	0	Running	19
19	24	18	Tyler Ankrum	McAnally–Hilgemann Racing	Chevrolet	249	0	Running	18
20	21	19	Daniel Hemric	McAnally–Hilgemann Racing	Chevrolet	249	0	Running	22
21	23	12	Brenden Queen (R)	Kaulig Racing	Ram	249	0	Running	16
22	11	13	Cole Butcher (R)	ThorSport Racing	Ford	249	0	Running	15
23	20	44	Andrés Pérez de Lara	Niece Motorsports	Chevrolet	248	0	Running	18
24	25	25	Ryan Newman	Kaulig Racing	Ram	248	0	Running	13
25	8	9	Grant Enfinger	CR7 Motorsports	Chevrolet	248	0	Running	13
26	13	16	Justin Haley	Kaulig Racing	Ram	248	0	Running	11
27	2	77	Carson Hocevar (i)	Spire Motorsports	Chevrolet	248	74	Running	0
28	28	14	Mini Tyrrell (R)	Kaulig Racing	Ram	248	0	Running	9
29	34	10	Corey LaJoie	Kaulig Racing	Ram	247	0	Running	8
30	26	81	Kris Wright	McAnally–Hilgemann Racing	Chevrolet	247	0	Running	7
31	35	22	Clayton Green	Team Reaume	Ford	246	0	Running	6
32	36	33	Frankie Muniz	Team Reaume	Ford	246	0	Running	5
33	29	2	Luke Baldwin	Team Reaume	Ford	245	0	Running	4
34	33	76	Nathan Nicholson	Freedom Racing Enterprises	Chevrolet	242	0	Accident	3
35	31	27	Kasey Kleyn	Rackley W.A.R.	Chevrolet	203	0	Electrical	2
36	32	4	Donovan Strauss	Niece Motorsports	Chevrolet	134	0	Overheating	1
Official race results

=== Race statistics ===
- Lead changes: 7 among 6 different drivers
- Cautions/Laps: 4 for 34 laps
- Red flags: 0
- Time of race: 1 hour, 42 minutes and 19 seconds
- Average speed: 91.627 miles per hour (147.459 km/h)

== Standings after the race ==
Drivers' Championship standings

	Pos	Driver	Points
	1	Layne Riggs	640
	2	Kaden Honeycutt	581 (–59)
	3	Chandler Smith	514 (–126)
	4	Christian Eckes	483 (–157)
	5	Gio Ruggiero	467 (–173)
	6	Ty Majeski	400 (–240)
	7	Ben Rhodes	386 (–254)
	8	Daniel Hemric	376 (–264)
	9	Grant Enfinger	356 (–284)
1	10	Stewart Friesen	336 (–304)
Official driver's standings

Manufacturers' Championship standings

Pos	Manufacturer	Points
1	Toyota	577
2	Ford	560 (–17)
3	Chevrolet	558 (–19)
4	Ram	378 (–199)

- Note: Only the first 10 positions are included for the driver standings.

== Notes ==
Previous race: 2026 LiUNA! 150	NASCAR Craftsman Truck Series; 2026 season	Next race: 2026 TSport 200
