= 2024 XPEL 225 =

5th race of the 2024 NASCAR Craftsman Truck Series

Race details
- Race 5 of 23 of the 2024 NASCAR Craftsman Truck Series
- Date: March 23, 2024
- Official name: 4th Annual XPEL 225
- Location: Circuit of the Americas in Austin, Texas
- Course: Permanent racing facility
- Course length: 3.426 miles (5.514 km)
- Distance: 46 laps, 156 mi (251 km)
- Scheduled distance: 42 laps, 140 mi (226 km)
- Average speed: 69.492 mph (111.837 km/h)

Pole position
Driver	Connor Zilisch	Spire Motorsports
- Time: 2:11.983

Most laps led
Driver	Corey Heim	Tricon Garage
- Laps: 31

Winner
No. 11	Corey Heim	Tricon Garage

Television in the United States
- Network: FS1
- Announcers: Jamie Little, Phil Parsons, and Michael Waltrip

Radio in the United States
- Radio: MRN

The 2024 XPEL 225 was the 4th stock car race of the 2024 NASCAR Craftsman Truck Series, and the 4th iteration of the event. The race was held on Saturday, March 23, 2024, at Circuit of the Americas in Austin, Texas, a 3.426 miles (5.514 km) permanent asphalt road course. The race was originally scheduled to be contested over 42 laps, but was increased to 46 laps due to a NASCAR overtime finish. In an action-packed race that featured numerous spins and penalties, Corey Heim, driving for Tricon Garage, was able to stretch out his fuel mileage with two laps to go, and held off the field to earn his sixth career NASCAR Craftsman Truck Series win, and his first of the season. Heim was the most dominant driver of the race, leading a race-high 31 laps and winning the second stage. To fill out the podium, Taylor Gray, driving for Tricon Garage, and Ty Majeski, driving for ThorSport Racing, would finish 2nd and 3rd, respectively. Connor Zilisch, who started on the pole, came back from an early race incident and went through several amounts of adversity, managing to earn a 4th place finish in his series debut.

== Report ==
=== Background ===
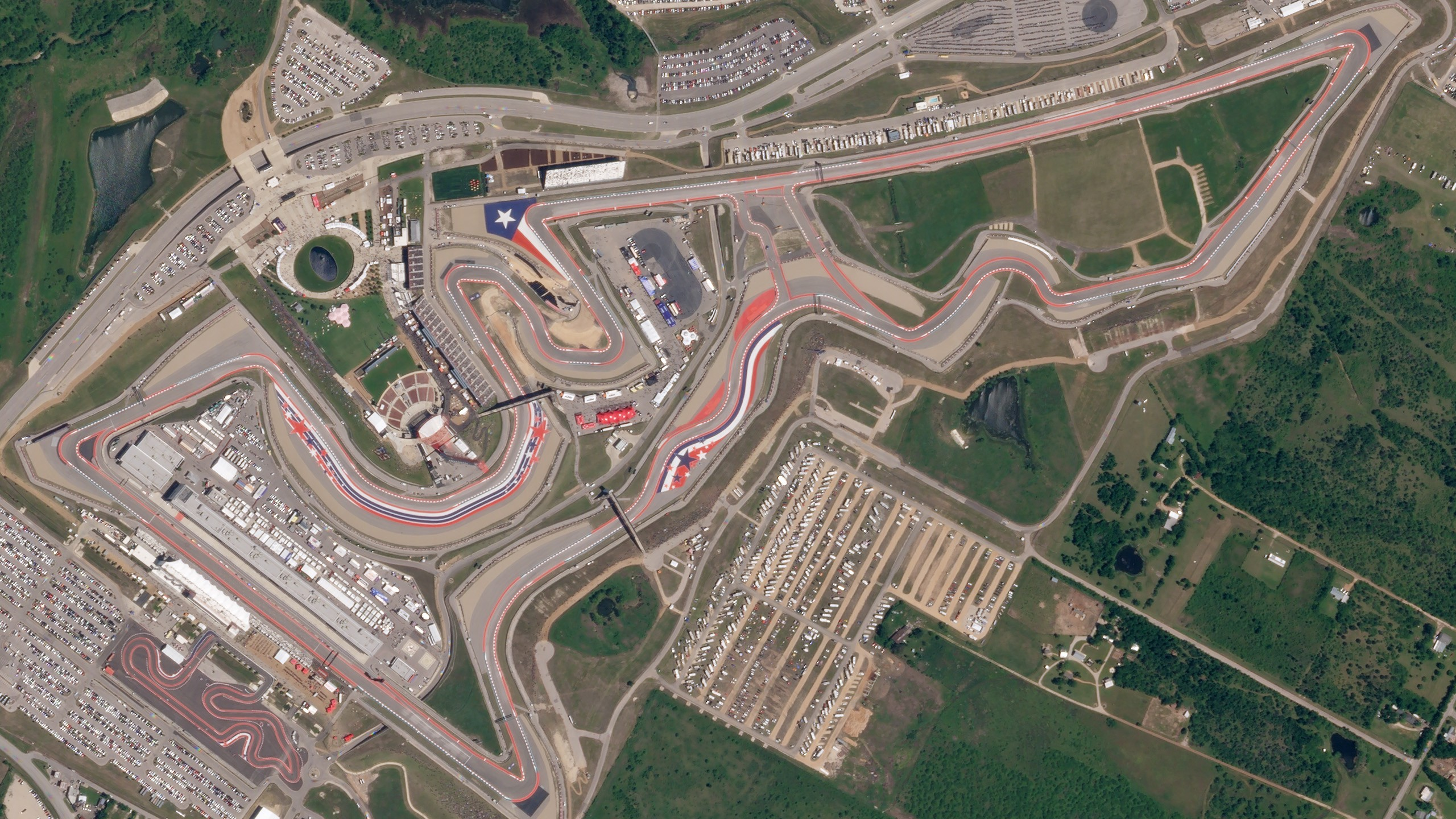
Aerial view of Circuit of the Americas, the circuit where the race will be held.

Circuit of the Americas (COTA) is a grade 1 FIA-specification motorsports facility located within the extraterritorial jurisdiction of Austin, Texas. It features a 3.426-mile (5.514 km) road racing circuit. The facility is home to the Formula One United States Grand Prix, and the Motorcycle Grand Prix of the Americas, a round of the FIM Road Racing World Championship. It previously hosted the Supercars Championship, the FIA World Endurance Championship, the IMSA SportsCar Championship, and IndyCar Series.

==== Entry list ====
- (R) denotes rookie driver.
- (i) denotes driver who is ineligible for series driver points.

#	Driver	Team	Make
1	Jack Hawksworth	Tricon Garage	Toyota
02	Mason Massey	Young's Motorsports	Chevrolet
2	Nick Sanchez	Rev Racing	Chevrolet
04	Marco Andretti	Roper Racing	Chevrolet
5	Dean Thompson	Tricon Garage	Toyota
7	Connor Zilisch	Spire Motorsports	Chevrolet
9	Grant Enfinger	CR7 Motorsports	Chevrolet
11	Corey Heim	Tricon Garage	Toyota
12	Dale Quarterley	Young's Motorsports	Toyota
13	Jake Garcia	ThorSport Racing	Ford
15	Tanner Gray	Tricon Garage	Toyota
17	Taylor Gray	Tricon Garage	Toyota
18	Tyler Ankrum	McAnally-Hilgemann Racing	Chevrolet
19	Christian Eckes	McAnally-Hilgemann Racing	Chevrolet
20	Vicente Salas	Young's Motorsports	Chevrolet
22	Carter Fartuch	Reaume Brothers Racing	Ford
25	Ty Dillon	Rackley WAR	Chevrolet
32	Bret Holmes	Bret Holmes Racing	Chevrolet
33	Lawless Alan	Reaume Brothers Racing	Ford
38	Layne Riggs (R)	Front Row Motorsports	Ford
41	Bayley Currey	Niece Motorsports	Chevrolet
42	Matt Mills	Niece Motorsports	Chevrolet
43	Daniel Dye	McAnally-Hilgemann Racing	Chevrolet
45	Ross Chastain (i)	Niece Motorsports	Chevrolet
46	Thad Moffitt (R)	Faction46	Chevrolet
52	Stewart Friesen	Halmar Friesen Racing	Toyota
56	Timmy Hill	Hill Motorsports	Toyota
71	Rajah Caruth	Spire Motorsports	Chevrolet
75	Stefan Parsons	Henderson Motorsports	Chevrolet
76	Spencer Boyd	Freedom Racing Enterprises	Chevrolet
77	Chase Purdy	Spire Motorsports	Chevrolet
88	Matt Crafton	ThorSport Racing	Ford
91	Jack Wood	McAnally-Hilgemann Racing	Chevrolet
98	Ty Majeski	ThorSport Racing	Ford
99	Ben Rhodes	ThorSport Racing	Ford
Official entry list

== Practice ==
The first and only practice session was held on Friday, March 22, at 2:30 PM CST, and would last for 20 minutes. Corey Heim, driving for Tricon Garage, would set the fastest time in the session, with a lap of 2:14.953, and a speed of 90.965 mph (146.394 km/h).

Pos.	#	Driver	Team	Make	Time	Speed
1	11	Corey Heim	Tricon Garage	Toyota	2:14.953	90.965
2	7	Connor Zilisch	Spire Motorsports	Chevrolet	2:15.352	90.697
3	45	Ross Chastain (i)	Niece Motorsports	Chevrolet	2:15.623	90.516
Full practice results

== Qualifying ==
Qualifying was held on Friday, March 22, at 3:00 PM CST. Since Circuit of the Americas is a road course, the qualifying system is a two group system, with two rounds. Drivers will be separated into two groups, Group A and Group B. Each driver will have multiple laps to set a time. The fastest 5 drivers from each group will advance to the final round. The fastest driver to set a time in that round will win the pole.

Under a 2021 rule change, the timing line in road course qualifying is ''not'' the start-finish line. Instead, the timing line for qualifying will be set at the exit of Istanbul 8. In his first career start, Connor Zilisch, driving for Spire Motorsports, would win the pole after advancing from the preliminary round and setting the fastest time in Round 2, with a track record lap of 2:11.983, and a speed of 93.012 mph (149.688 km/h).

No drivers would fail to qualify.

=== Qualifying results ===
Pos.	#	Driver	Team	Make	Time (R1)	Speed (R1)	Time (R2)	Speed (R2)
1	7	Connor Zilisch	Spire Motorsports	Chevrolet	2:12.084	92.941	2:11.983	93.012
2	11	Corey Heim	Tricon Garage	Toyota	2:13.306	92.089	2:12.697	92.512
3	17	Taylor Gray	Tricon Garage	Toyota	2:13.486	91.965	2:13.171	92.182
4	2	Nick Sanchez	Rev Racing	Chevrolet	2:13.143	92.202	2:13.234	92.139
5	45	Ross Chastain (i)	Niece Motorsports	Chevrolet	2:13.533	91.932	2:13.738	91.791
6	1	Jack Hawksworth	Tricon Garage	Toyota	2:14.177	91.491	2:14.188	91.484
7	15	Tanner Gray	Tricon Garage	Toyota	2:14.117	91.532	2:14.506	91.267
8	38	Layne Riggs (R)	Front Row Motorsports	Ford	2:14.518	91.259	2:14.611	91.196
9	98	Ty Majeski	ThorSport Racing	Ford	2:14.134	91.520	2:15.010	90.927
10	19	Christian Eckes	McAnally-Hilgemann Racing	Chevrolet	2:13.966	91.635	2:15.265	90.755
Eliminated from Round 1
11	71	Rajah Caruth	Spire Motorsports	Chevrolet	2:14.144	91.514	—	—
12	18	Tyler Ankrum	McAnally-Hilgemann Racing	Chevrolet	2:14.527	91.253	—	—
13	52	Stewart Friesen	Halmar Friesen Racing	Toyota	2:14.694	91.140	—	—
14	9	Grant Enfinger	CR7 Motorsports	Chevrolet	2:14.774	91.086	—	—
15	41	Bayley Currey	Niece Motorsports	Chevrolet	2:14.849	91.035	—	—
16	77	Chase Purdy	Spire Motorsports	Chevrolet	2:15.075	90.883	—	—
17	5	Dean Thompson	Tricon Garage	Toyota	2:15.105	90.863	—	—
18	25	Ty Dillon	Rackley WAR	Chevrolet	2:15.278	90.746	—	—
19	75	Stefan Parsons	Henderson Motorsports	Chevrolet	2:15.442	90.637	—	—
20	33	Lawless Alan	Reaume Brothers Racing	Ford	2:15.555	90.561	—	—
21	88	Matt Crafton	ThorSport Racing	Ford	2:15.986	90.274	—	—
22	91	Jack Wood	McAnally-Hilgemann Racing	Chevrolet	2:16.174	90.149	—	—
23	43	Daniel Dye	McAnally-Hilgemann Racing	Chevrolet	2:16.269	90.087	—	—
24	42	Matt Mills	Niece Motorsports	Chevrolet	2:16.939	89.646	—	—
25	13	Jake Garcia	ThorSport Racing	Ford	2:17.101	89.540	—	—
26	32	Bret Holmes	Bret Holmes Racing	Chevrolet	2:17.695	89.154	—	—
27	56	Timmy Hill	Hill Motorsports	Toyota	2:18.468	88.656	—	—
28	04	Marco Andretti	Roper Racing	Chevrolet	2:18.588	88.579	—	—
29	22	Carter Fartuch	Reaume Brothers Racing	Ford	2:18.822	88.430	—	—
30	76	Spencer Boyd	Freedom Racing Enterprises	Chevrolet	2:19.112	88.245	—	—
31	20	Vicente Salas	Young's Motorsports	Chevrolet	2:19.448	88.033	—	—
Qualified by owner's points
32	02	Mason Massey	Young's Motorsports	Chevrolet	2:21.253	86.908	—	—
33	12	Dale Quarterley	Young's Motorsports	Toyota	2:25.994	84.086	—	—
34	99	Ben Rhodes	ThorSport Racing	Ford	—	—	—	—
35	46	Thad Moffitt (R)	Faction46	Chevrolet	—	—	—	—
Official qualifying results
Official starting lineup

== Race results ==
Stage 1 Laps: 12

Pos.	#	Driver	Team	Make	Pts
1	2	Nick Sanchez	Rev Racing	Chevrolet	10
2	98	Ty Majeski	ThorSport Racing	Ford	9
3	15	Tanner Gray	Tricon Garage	Toyota	8
4	18	Tyler Ankrum	McAnally-Hilgemann Racing	Chevrolet	7
5	19	Christian Eckes	McAnally-Hilgemann Racing	Chevrolet	6
6	99	Ben Rhodes	ThorSport Racing	Ford	5
7	77	Chase Purdy	Spire Motorsports	Chevrolet	4
8	88	Matt Crafton	ThorSport Racing	Ford	3
9	91	Jack Wood	McAnally-Hilgemann Racing	Chevrolet	2
10	25	Ty Dillon	Rackley WAR	Chevrolet	1

Stage 2 Laps: 14

Pos.	#	Driver	Team	Make	Pts
1	11	Corey Heim	Tricon Garage	Toyota	10
2	98	Ty Majeski	ThorSport Racing	Ford	9
4	1	Jack Hawksworth	Tricon Garage	Toyota	8
3	99	Ben Rhodes	ThorSport Racing	Ford	7
5	17	Taylor Gray	Tricon Garage	Toyota	6
6	7	Connor Zilisch	Spire Motorsports	Chevrolet	5
7	71	Rajah Caruth	Spire Motorsports	Chevrolet	4
8	18	Tyler Ankrum	McAnally-Hilgemann Racing	Chevrolet	3
9	5	Dean Thompson	Tricon Garage	Toyota	2
10	88	Matt Crafton	ThorSport Racing	Ford	1

Stage 3 Laps: 20

Fin	St	#	Driver	Team	Make	Laps	Led	Status	Pts
1	2	11	Corey Heim	Tricon Garage	Toyota	46	31	Running	50
2	3	17	Taylor Gray	Tricon Garage	Toyota	46	0	Running	41
3	9	98	Ty Majeski	ThorSport Racing	Ford	46	2	Running	52
4	1	7	Connor Zilisch	Spire Motorsports	Chevrolet	46	0	Running	38
5	5	45	Ross Chastain (i)	Niece Motorsports	Chevrolet	46	0	Running	0
6	6	1	Jack Hawksworth	Tricon Garage	Toyota	46	1	Running	39
7	34	99	Ben Rhodes	ThorSport Racing	Ford	46	0	Running	42
8	10	19	Christian Eckes	McAnally-Hilgemann Racing	Chevrolet	46	1	Running	35
9	17	5	Dean Thompson	Tricon Garage	Toyota	46	0	Running	30
10	7	15	Tanner Gray	Tricon Garage	Toyota	46	4	Running	35
11	18	25	Ty Dillon	Rackley WAR	Chevrolet	46	0	Running	27
12	14	9	Grant Enfinger	CR7 Motorsports	Chevrolet	46	0	Running	25
13	22	91	Jack Wood	McAnally-Hilgemann Racing	Chevrolet	46	0	Running	26
14	25	13	Jake Garcia	ThorSport Racing	Ford	46	0	Running	23
15	11	71	Rajah Caruth	Spire Motorsports	Chevrolet	46	0	Running	26
16	15	41	Bayley Currey	Niece Motorsports	Chevrolet	46	0	Running	21
17	27	56	Timmy Hill	Hill Motorsports	Toyota	46	0	Running	20
18	4	2	Nick Sanchez	Rev Racing	Chevrolet	46	4	Running	29
19	19	75	Stefan Parsons	Henderson Motorsports	Chevrolet	46	0	Running	18
20	13	52	Stewart Friesen	Halmar Friesen Racing	Toyota	46	2	Running	17
21	29	22	Carter Fartuch	Reaume Brothers Racing	Ford	46	0	Running	16
22	16	77	Chase Purdy	Spire Motorsports	Chevrolet	46	0	Running	19
23	21	88	Matt Crafton	ThorSport Racing	Ford	46	0	Running	18
24	24	42	Matt Mills	Niece Motorsports	Chevrolet	46	0	Running	13
25	12	18	Tyler Ankrum	McAnally-Hilgemann Racing	Chevrolet	46	0	Running	22
26	33	12	Dale Quarterley	Young's Motorsports	Toyota	45	0	Running	11
27	8	38	Layne Riggs (R)	Front Row Motorsports	Ford	43	1	Running	10
28	23	43	Daniel Dye	McAnally-Hilgemann Racing	Chevrolet	42	0	Running	9
29	26	32	Bret Holmes	Bret Holmes Racing	Chevrolet	42	0	Running	8
30	30	76	Spencer Boyd	Freedom Racing Enterprises	Chevrolet	42	0	Running	7
31	28	04	Marco Andretti	Roper Racing	Chevrolet	40	0	Suspension	6
32	35	46	Thad Moffitt (R)	Faction46	Chevrolet	39	0	Running	5
33	20	33	Lawless Alan	Reaume Brothers Racing	Ford	34	0	Rear Gear	4
34	31	20	Vicente Salas	Young's Motorsports	Chevrolet	33	0	Transmission	3
35	32	02	Mason Massey	Young's Motorsports	Chevrolet	32	0	Brakes	2
Official race results

== Standings after the race ==
Drivers' Championship standings

	Pos	Driver	Points
1	1	Corey Heim	207
2	2	Ty Majeski	197 (-10)
2	3	Tyler Ankrum	196 (–11)
3	4	Taylor Gray	179 (–28)
2	5	Rajah Caruth	178 (–29)
1	6	Christian Eckes	177 (–30)
1	7	Nick Sanchez	170 (–37)
	8	Matt Crafton	148 (–59)
	9	Grant Enfinger	139 (–68)
2	10	Tanner Gray	121 (–86)
Official driver's standings

Manufacturers' Championship standings

Pos	Manufacturer	Points
1	Chevrolet	160
2	Toyota	133 (–27)
3	Ford	127 (–33)

- Note: Only the first 10 positions are included for the driver standings.

Previous race: 2024 Weather Guard Truck Race	NASCAR Craftsman Truck Series; 2024 season	Next race: 2024 Long John Silver's 200
