= Casey Kirwan =

American esports driver (born 1999)

Personal information
- Born: July 30, 1999 (age 27); Matthews, North Carolina, US

Career information
- Games: iRacing

Team history
- 2019: Clint Bowyer Racing
- 2020: Denny Hamlin Racing
- 2021–2023: XSET
- 2024: Spire Motorsports
- 2024–2025: Channel 199 Sim Racing
- 2025–2026: Kansas City Pioneers

Career highlights and awards
- 1× eNASCAR Coca-Cola iRacing Series champion (2022)

Casey Kirwan (born July 30, 1999) is an American esports driver who drives for the Kansas City Pioneers in the eNASCAR Coca-Cola iRacing Series. Kirwan won the 2022 championship and finished runner-up in 2025.

== Esports career ==
Kirwan made his eNASCAR debut in 2018. In 2019, he signed with Clint Bowyer Racing and won his first career race at the regular season finale at Bristol Motor Speedway, finishing the season in tenth place with three top-five finishes. Kirwan also raced in the 2019 iRacing World of Outlaws Morton Buildings Late Model World Championship for Clint Bowyer Racing finishing 15th in the standings with one top-five finish.

In 2020, Kirwan joined Denny Hamlin Racing for the eNASCAR season and won one race at Michigan International Speedway.

Kirwan joined XSET for the 2021 season and narrowly missed the playoffs after scoring seven top-ten finishes in the regular season. Outside of eNASCAR, Kirwan won the Podium 500 at Daytona International Speedway and won $1,000.

In 2022, Kirwan remained with XSET and won at Pocono Raceway to secure a playoff spot for the first time. Kirwan advanced to the championship round which would be held at the NASCAR Hall of Fame in Charlotte, North Carolina for the first time. Kirwan would finish second in the race, enough to win his first eNASCAR Coca-Cola iRacing Series championship.

Kirwan again advanced to the playoffs in 2023 after winning at Talladega Superspeedway and Darlington Raceway. Kirwan would narrowly miss the championship round following a strategy call at penultimate race at Phoenix Raceway. Kirwan signed with Spire Motorsports for the 2024 season, again narrowly missing the playoffs.

Kirwan signed with the Kansas City Pioneers for the 2025 season. While Kirwan again went winless, he scored six top-five finishes and qualified for his second championship round appearance. Kirwan finished second in the championship to Steven Wilson after finishing sixth in the race, earning him a $50,000 prize.

== Racing record ==
=== Esports career summary ===
Season	Series	Team	Wins	Top 5	Poles	Laps Led	Points	Position
2018	NASCAR PEAK Antifreeze iRacing Series	Deadzone Racing	0	1	0	6	416	15th
2018	World of Outlaws Late Model World Championship Series	Deadzone Racing	0	1	0		421	11th
2019	NASCAR PEAK Antifreeze iRacing Series	Clint Bowyer Racing	1	3	0	61	467	10th
2019	iRacing World of Outlaws Morton Buildings Late Model Championship	Clint Bowyer Racing	0	1	0	6	300	15th
2020	eNASCAR Coca-Cola iRacing Series	Denny Hamlin Racing	1	1	0	32	405	19th
2021	eNASCAR Coca-Cola iRacing Series	XSET	0	2	0	49	408	11th
2022	eNASCAR Coca-Cola iRacing Series	XSET	1	8	1	122	3035	1st
2023	eNASCAR Coca-Cola iRacing Series	XSET	2	0	6	79	2105	7th
2023	IMSA Esports Global Championship	XSET	1	1	0		1064	8th
2024	eNASCAR Coca-Cola iRacing Series	Spire Motorsports	0	6	0	32	446	11th
2024	IMSA Esports Global Championship	Channel 199 Sim Racing	0	1	0		982	8th
2025	eNASCAR Coca-Cola iRacing Series	Kansas City Pioneers	0	6	1	44	3031	2nd
2025	IMSA Esports Global Championship	Channel 199 Sim Racing	0	1	0		966	7th
2025	Porsche TAG Heuer Esports Supercup All-Stars		1	6	1	11	248	1st
