= Vicente Salas =

American racing driver (born 2002)

- Born: Vicente Austin Salas; August 20, 2002 (age 24); Temecula, California, U.S.

NASCAR O'Reilly Auto Parts Series career
- 2 races run over 1 year
- 2025 position: 66th
- Best finish: 66th (2025)
- First race: 2025 North Carolina Education Lottery 250 (Rockingham)
- Last race: 2025 Pacific Office Automation 147 (Portland)
Wins	Top tens	Poles
0	0	0

NASCAR FedEx Freight Truck Series career
- 2 races run over 1 year
- 2024 position: 61st
- Best finish: 61st (2024)
- First race: 2024 XPEL 225 (COTA)
- Last race: 2024 Toyota 200 (Gateway)
Wins	Top tens	Poles
0	0	0
- Statistics up to date as of November 1, 2025.

Vicente Austin Salas (born August 20, 2002) is an American professional stock car racing driver. He last competed part-time in the NASCAR Xfinity Series, driving the No. 45 Chevrolet Camaro SS for Alpha Prime Racing. He also competes in the eNASCAR Coca-Cola iRacing Series, and won the 2023 championship in the Contender Series.

== Racing career ==
In 2018, Salas started his racing career by racing karts at local tracks in California. By the time he was fifteen, he had moved up to shifter karts and started competing at a national level. His career was temporarily halted by the COVID-19 pandemic, where he switched over to the eNASCAR Coca-Cola iRacing Series, and saw some success with a dominating win in the 2021 race at Richmond Raceway, where he led every single lap of the race.

Salas began competing in late model racing in 2022 in the CARS Tour, which was his first time racing a real-life car. A fourth-place finish in his first race convinced team owner Justin Carroll to give him a full-time ride in the series for the 2023 season. On March 18, 2024, it was announced that he would make his NASCAR Craftsman Truck Series debut in the race at Circuit of the Americas driving the No. 20 truck for Young's Motorsports. He started 31st, but his day ended early with his truck having transmission issues and he finished 34th. Salas made his second Truck Series start at World Wide Technology Raceway driving the No. 91 for McAnally–Hilgemann Racing.

== Motorsports career results ==
=== NASCAR ===
(key) (Bold – Pole position awarded by qualifying time. Italics – Pole position earned by points standings or practice time. * – Most laps led.)

==== Xfinity Series ====
NASCAR Xfinity Series results
Year	Team	No.	Make	1	2	3	4	5	6	7	8	9	10	11	12	13	14	15	16	17	18	19	20	21	22	23	24	25	26	27	28	29	30	31	32	33	NXSC	Pts	Ref
2025	Alpha Prime Racing	45	Chevy	DAY	ATL	COA	PHO	LVS	HOM	MAR	DAR	BRI	CAR; 24	TAL	TEX	CLT	NSH	MXC	POC	ATL	CSC	SON	DOV	IND	IOW	GLN	DAY	PIR; 37	GTW	BRI	KAN	ROV	LVS	TAL	MAR	PHO	66th	14	

==== Craftsman Truck Series ====
NASCAR Craftsman Truck Series results
Year	Team	No.	Make	1	2	3	4	5	6	7	8	9	10	11	12	13	14	15	16	17	18	19	20	21	22	23	NCTC	Pts	Ref
2024	Young's Motorsports	20	Chevy	DAY	ATL	LVS	BRI	COA; 34	MAR	TEX	KAN	DAR	NWS	CLT													61st	15	
2024	McAnally–Hilgemann Racing	91	Chevy												GTW; 25	NSH	POC	IRP	RCH	MLW	BRI	KAN	TAL	HOM	MAR	PHO	61st	15	

^{*} Season still in progress
^{1} Ineligible for series points

=== CARS Late Model Stock Car Tour ===
(key) (Bold – Pole position awarded by qualifying time. Italics – Pole position earned by points standings or practice time. * – Most laps led. ** – All laps led.)

CARS Late Model Stock Car Tour results
Year	Team	No.	Make	1	2	3	4	5	6	7	8	9	10	11	12	13	14	15	CLMSCTC	Pts	Ref
2025	AK Performance	16S	N/A	AAS	WCS	CDL	OCS	ACE	NWS	LGY	DOM	CRW	HCY; DNQ	AND	FLC	SBO	TCM	NWS	108th	5	

=== CARS Pro Late Model Tour ===
(key)

CARS Pro Late Model Tour results
Year	Team	No.	Make	1	2	3	4	5	6	7	8	9	10	11	12	CPLMTC	Pts	Ref
2022	N/A	24	Toyota	CRW	HCY; 4	GPS	FCS	TCM	HCY	ACE	MMS	TCM	ACE	SBO	CRW	35th	29	
