= ENASCAR Coca-Cola iRacing Series =

Esports racing league

eNASCAR Coca-Cola iRacing Series
- Category: Esports (Racing)
- Country: United States
- Inaugural season: 2010
- Drivers: 40
- Teams: 20
- Drivers' champion: Steven Wilson
- Teams' champion: Spire Motorsports
- Official website: eNASCAR Coca-Cola iRacing Series

The eNASCAR Coca-Cola iRacing Series (formerly PEAK Antifreeze iRacing Series and NASCAR iRacing World Championship) is an online sim racing esports competition hosted on subscription-based sim racing video game iRacing.

Since 2022, the season finale has been held at the NASCAR Hall of Fame in Charlotte, North Carolina. The champion is awarded the Dale Earnhardt Jr. Trophy, inspired by the NASCAR Winston Cup championship trophy awarded from the 1970s to 2003.

== History ==
In 2020, Coca-Cola was announced as the new title sponsor for the series, including an increase in prize pool to $300,000.

Before a race in 2021, drivers discovered the Chevrolet Camaro was at a handling disadvantage to other cars in the field. Due to the discovery of the problem too soon to the start of the race, iRacing allowed the race to run. Following the race, iRacing announced that there was a "small difference in [aerodynamics] for the Chevrolet" and that all drivers will be awarded a drop week for the season.

== Drivers ==
Many drivers who have raced in the series have moved up to real-world racing or simulation work for NASCAR teams. 2021 champion Keegan Leahy was signed as a performance consultant for 23XI Racing and was credited by Tyler Reddick on his 2023 win at Circuit of the Americas. Three-time series champion Steven Wilson was hired as Spire Motorsports' sim driver in 2026. Four-time champion Ray Alfalla raced in a limited late model race at Hickory Motor Speedway, finishing 18th after a fuel pump failure.

== Champions ==
Season	Driver	Team	Starts	Wins	Top 5	Top 10	Poles	Points
2010	Richard Towler	Drill Aisle	16	4	12	12		2626
2011	Ray Alfalla	JR Motorsports	16	3	11	13		635
2012	Ray Alfalla	JR Motorsports	16	5	12	14	3	643
2013	Tyler Hudson	One Up Motorsport	17	1	7	11	0	615
2014	Michael Conti	Drill Aisle	15	3	10	12	4	570
2015	Kenny Humpe	The TEAM	15	5	11	12	5	571
2016	Ray Alfalla	Slip Angle Motorsports	15	2	13	14	6	634
2017	Ryan Luza	Simworx Racing	15	5	10	11	3	3048
2018	Ray Alfalla	Slip Angle Motorsports	17	2	9	13	0	3044
2019	Zach Novak	Roush Fenway Racing	18	4	7	8	0	3044
2020	Nick Ottinger	William Byron eSports	20	2	9	13	1	4037
2021	Keegan Leahy	23XI Racing	18	3	5	9	4	3040
2022	Casey Kirwan	XSET	18	1	8	12	1	4034
2023	Steven Wilson	Stewart-Haas Racing	18	1	5	9	1	3035
2024	Parker White	Williams Esports	18	2	9	12	0	3040
2025	Steven Wilson	Spire Motorsports	18	8	12	14	1	3040
2026	Steven Wilson	Spire Motorsports	13	3	9	10	0	3035
