= Ray Alfalla =

Cuban and American esports driver (born 1989)

Personal information
- Born: July 1, 1989 (age 37); Matanzas, Cuba

Career information
- Game: iRacing
- Playing career: 2009–present

Team history
- 2011–2012: JR Motorsports
- 2013: Drill Aisle
- 2014–2018: Slip Angle Motorsports
- 2019: Wood Brothers Racing
- 2020: Virtual Racing School
- 2021–2022: Joe Gibbs Racing
- 2024: eRacr

Career highlights and awards
- 4× eNASCAR Coca-Cola iRacing Series champion (2011, 2012, 2016, 2018); 1× eNASCAR iRacing Pro Series champion (2019)

Ray Alfalla (born July 1, 1989) is a Cuban and American esports driver who last drove for eRacr in the 2024 eNASCAR Coca-Cola iRacing Series. Alfalla is the most successful driver of all time in the eNASCAR Coca-Cola iRacing Series, winning the 2011, 2012, 2016, and 2018 championships, and is the winningest driver with 27 victories. Alfalla also finished runner-up in the championship three years in a row from 2013 to 2015.

== Esports career ==
Alfalla began sim racing in 2003 with the release of NASCAR Racing 2003 Season.

On iRacing, Alfalla qualified for the 2011 Intel Grand Prix Series World Final held in Hanover, Germany as companion to the Intel Extreme Masters, finishing fourth. Later that year Alfalla won his first NASCAR iRacing Series World Championship title, winning three races and finishing in the top-5 eleven times. Alfalla's championship win netted him $10,500 and a trip to the 2011 Ford 400. Alfalla defended his championship title in 2012, winning five races.

Following three straight years of runner-up championship finishes, Alfalla finally won his third championship in 2016.

In 2018, Alfalla won his fourth championship after only winning two races and leading 52 laps. After being relegated from the series in 2019, Alfalla bounced back to win the 2019 eNASCAR iRacing Pro Series championship to requalify for the 2020 season. Alfalla snapped a two-year winless streak in 2020, winning at Atlanta Motor Speedway. In 2021, Alfalla again won one race at Charlotte Motor Speedway.

After struggling early in the season with an average finish of 24th, Alfalla scored his 27th and, as of the 2025 season, final win in 2022 at Nashville Superspeedway. Alfalla failed to qualify for a season of eNASCAR for the first time in 2023.

== Racing career ==
In 2013, Alfalla tested Ernie Francis Jr's Mazda Miata at the Homestead-Miami Speedway road course.

In 2022, Alfalla tested a limited late model at Hickory Motor Speedway.

== Personal life ==
In 1995, Alfalla and his family immigrated from Cuba to the Miami area.

Alfalla attended Florida Gulf Coast University studying forensic science.

== Racing record ==
=== Esports career summary ===
Season	Series	Team	Wins	Top 5	Poles	Laps Led	Points	Position
2010	NASCAR iRacing Drivers World Championship		1	4	1	221	2171	8th
2011	NASCAR iRacing Drivers World Championship	JR Motorsports	3	11	1	377	635	1st
2011	iRacing Nvidia Grand Prix Series		0	2	0	0	213	15th
2012	NASCAR iRacing Drivers World Championship	JR Motorsports	5	12	3	614	643	1st
2013	NASCAR iRacing.com Series World Championship	Drill Aisle	2	11	3	342	606	2nd
2014	NASCAR PEAK Antifreeze iRacing Series	Slip Angle Motorsports	2	9	4	197	555	2nd
2015	NASCAR PEAK Antifreeze iRacing Series	Slip Angle Motorsports	4	9	1	431	558	2nd
2016	NASCAR PEAK Antifreeze iRacing Series	Slip Angle Motorsports	2	13	6	575	634	1st
2017	NASCAR PEAK Antifreeze iRacing Series	Slip Angle Motorsports	3	7	0	264	3014	4th
2018	NASCAR PEAK Antifreeze iRacing Series	Slip Angle Motorsports	2	9	0	52	3044	1st
2019	NASCAR PEAK Antifreeze iRacing Series	Wood Brothers Racing	0	1	0	62	372	21st
2020	eNASCAR Coca-Cola iRacing Series	Virtual Racing School	1	3	1	142	2087	8th
2021	eNASCAR Coca-Cola iRacing Series	Joe Gibbs Racing	1	3	0	30	322	19th
2022	eNASCAR Coca-Cola iRacing Series	Joe Gibbs Racing	1	3	0	25	291	21st
2024	eNASCAR Coca-Cola iRacing Series	eRacr	0	0	0	3	149	36th
