= ENASCAR =

ESports racing series

eNASCAR
- Game: iRacing
- Founded: 2018; 8 years ago
- Owner: NASCAR
- CEO: Jim France
- President: Steve Phelps
- Divisions: 3
- Broadcasters: Twitch, YouTube, Facebook
- Website: enascar.com

eNASCAR was launched in 2018, by the parent company, NASCAR, to act as the Esports arm of the auto-racing body. The organization primarily uses the iRacing game via a PC platform for organizing its competitions, but has previously used other systems, such as those created by Xbox and PlayStation, and other games. As of 2022, eNASCAR officially sanctions three leagues.

== Current series ==
=== Coca-Cola iRacing Series ===
The series was founded in 2010, in a partnership with iRacing, with the first race taking place on February 9, 2010. The 2023 champion is Steven Wilson. A regular season consists of 14 rounds, and one exhibition, that begins in mid-February, at Daytona International Speedway, and ends in August. A total of 40 racers, who race Cup-style cars, compete for ten spots in the playoffs. Points are gained for each race using the current Cup Series format. The ten drivers then qualify for the playoffs with all their points increased to 2,000 plus three bonus points for each win. Each winner of the following three races make the playoffs, as do the highest non-winning drivers until there are four finalists. The winner of the series is determined by which of the four finalists finishes ahead of the other three in the final round.

=== College iRacing Series ===
In 2022, NASCAR and collegiate esports league NACE Starleague joined to form the eNASCAR College iRacing Series. The three-round series allows full-time college students to compete for a chance to win scholarships. The series uses the iRacing platform to host the races with racers using both the Truck Series and Xfinity Series chassis. Each round has a two-week time-trial event that takes place a few weeks prior to the race in which the fastest 40 entries make the A Main race, the next fastest from 41-80 make the B Main race, and finally the next fastest from 81-120 make the C Main race. Only one entry per school is permitted to make the race. As of 2025, the overall prize pool is at $60,000 with the winning driver receiving $10,000 in the championship race while for weekly rounds the winning driver receives $1,000, second place $750, and third $550.

=== International Series ===
In June 2021, NASCAR announced a three-race international series that would be hosted on the iRacing platform. The series, which will use Xfinity Series vehicles, will allow non-American racers to compete in a NASCAR-sanctioned eSports series. The inaugural year consisted of a three-course schedule, which grew to five races in 2022. Members of the NASCAR Pinty's Series (Canada), NASCAR Mexico Series, and NASCAR Whelen Euro Series (Europe) are eligible for the series, as are the members of NASCAR's 2022 Drive for Diversity class.

=== Road To Pro Series ===
The Road To Pro series is separated into two divisions, Contender and Qualifying. These series are designed to create platforms for armature racers to make it to the Coca-Cola Series with racers first making their way through the Qualifying Series and being promoted to the Contender Series.

== Former series ==
=== eNASCAR iRacing Pro Invitational Series ===
While NASCAR was delayed in 2020 due to the COVID-19 pandemic, NASCAR arranged for drivers, both past and present, a series on the iRacing platform. On March 22, 2020, 903,000 people watched the first race at the Homestead–Miami Speedway virtual track, which was an eSports television rating record. This was surpassed a week later when more than 1.3 million people tuned into the virtual race at Texas Motor Speedway.

The series was renewed in 2021, for ten races, and featured never-run courses such as a dirt track at Bristol Motor Speedway and a fictitious Chicago Street Course. After five races, the series was indefinitely discontinued.

=== eNASCAR Heat Pro League ===
The Heat Pro League ran for two seasons, from 2019 to 2020. The 14-event league featured 28 gamers competing virtually on NASCAR Heat via the PlayStation 4 and Xbox One consoles. The series ended when NASCAR 21: Ignition was released.
