= 2026 Timberland PRO 200 =

NASCAR O'Reilly Auto Parts Series race at Phoenix Raceway

Race details
- Race 30 of 33 in the 2026 NASCAR O'Reilly Auto Parts Series
- Date: October 17, 2026
- Location: Phoenix Raceway in Avondale, Arizona
- Course: Permanent racing facility
- Course length: 1.000 miles (1.609 km)
- Distance: 200 laps, 200 mi (321.868 km)
- Average speed: 96.373 miles per hour (155.097 km/h)

Pole position
Driver	Jesse Love	Richard Childress Racing
- Time: 27.336

Most laps led
Driver	Jesse Love	Richard Childress Racing
- Laps: 156

Fastest lap
Driver	Justin Allgaier	JR Motorsports
- Time: 28.314

Winner
No. 2	Jesse Love	Richard Childress Racing

Television in the United States
- Network: The CW
- Announcers: Adam Alexander, Jamie McMurray, and Parker Kligerman

Radio in the United States
- Radio: MRN
- Booth announcers: Alex Hayden, Mike Bagley, and Todd Gordon
- Turn announcers: Dan Hubbard (1 & 2) and Tim Catalfamo (3 & 4)

The 2026 Timberland PRO 200 was a NASCAR O'Reilly Auto Parts Series race that was held on Saturday, October 17, 2026, at Phoenix Raceway in Avondale, Arizona. Contested over 200 laps on the 1.000 mi (1.609 km) oval, it was the 30th race of the 2026 NASCAR O'Reilly Auto Parts Series season, the sixth race in the NASCAR Chase, and the 28th running of the event.

Jesse Love, driving for Richard Childress Racing, pulled off a dominating performance, sweeping both stages and leading a race-high 156 laps while holding off a charging Sam Mayer in the final laps to earn his fifth career NASCAR O'Reilly Auto Parts Series win, his second of the season, and his second consecutive win in the Phoenix fall race. Mayer finished 2nd, and Justin Allgaier finished third. Corey Day and Sammy Smith rounded out the top five, while Brandon Jones, Dean Thompson, William Sawalich, Rajah Caruth, and Carson Kvapil rounded out the top ten.

== Report ==
=== Background ===
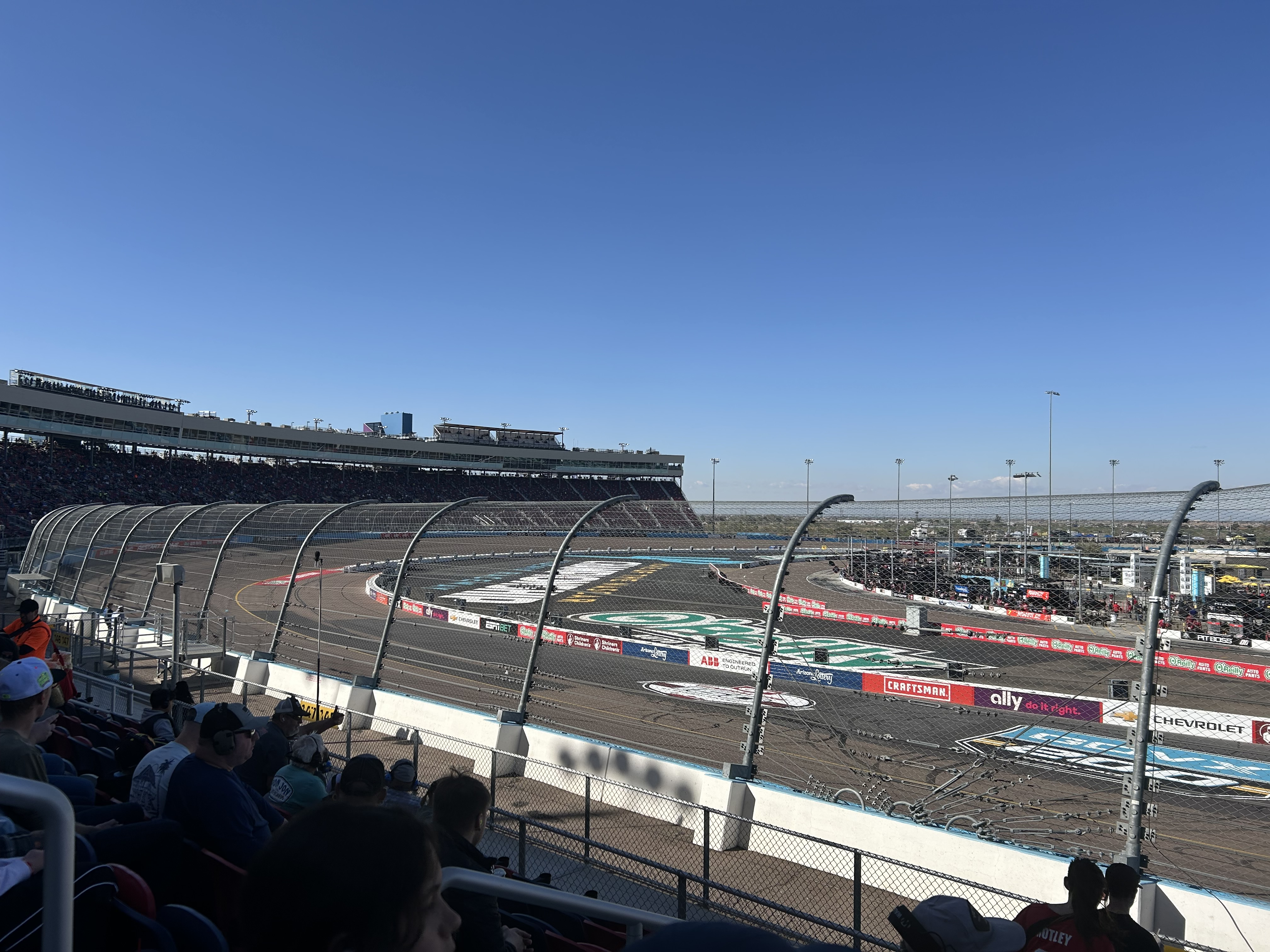
Phoenix Raceway, the circuit where the race was held.

Phoenix Raceway is a one-mile, low-banked tri-oval race track located in Avondale, Arizona. It is named after the nearby metropolitan area of Phoenix. The motorsport track opened in 1964 and currently hosts two NASCAR race weekends annually. PIR has also hosted the IndyCar Series, CART, USAC and the Rolex Sports Car Series. The raceway is currently owned and operated by NASCAR.

Timberland PRO was announced as the title sponsor on September 22, 2026.

==== Entry list ====
- (R) denotes rookie driver.
- (i) denotes driver who is ineligible for series driver points.
- (CC) denotes chase contender.
- (OC) denotes owners' chase contender car.

#	Driver	Team	Make
00	Sheldon Creed (CC)	Haas Factory Team	Chevrolet
0	Garrett Smithley	SS-Green Light Racing	Chevrolet
1	Carson Kvapil (CC)	JR Motorsports	Chevrolet
02	Ryan Ellis	Young's Motorsports	Chevrolet
2	Jesse Love (CC)	Richard Childress Racing	Chevrolet
07	Josh Bilicki	SS-Green Light Racing	Chevrolet
7	Justin Allgaier (CC)	JR Motorsports	Chevrolet
8	Sammy Smith (CC)	JR Motorsports	Chevrolet
9	Jake Finch	JR Motorsports	Chevrolet
17	Corey Day (CC)	Hendrick Motorsports	Chevrolet
18	William Sawalich	Joe Gibbs Racing	Toyota
19	Brent Crews (OC) (R)	Joe Gibbs Racing	Toyota
20	Brandon Jones (CC)	Joe Gibbs Racing	Toyota
21	Austin Hill (CC)	Richard Childress Racing	Chevrolet
24	Harrison Burton	Sam Hunt Racing	Toyota
26	Dean Thompson	Sam Hunt Racing	Toyota
27	Jeb Burton	Jordan Anderson Racing	Chevrolet
28	Kyle Sieg	RSS Racing	Chevrolet
31	Blaine Perkins	Jordan Anderson Racing	Chevrolet
32	Andrew Paterson	Jordan Anderson Racing	Chevrolet
39	Ryan Sieg	RSS Racing	Chevrolet
41	Sam Mayer (CC)	Haas Factory Team	Chevrolet
42	Brad Perez	Young's Motorsports	Chevrolet
43	Connor Mosack (i)	SPS Racing	Chevrolet
44	Brennan Poole	Alpha Prime Racing	Ford
45	Lavar Scott (R)	Alpha Prime Racing	Chevrolet
47	Dawson Cram	Mike Harmon Racing	Chevrolet
48	Patrick Staropoli (R)	Big Machine Racing	Chevrolet
51	Jeremy Clements	Jeremy Clements Racing	Chevrolet
53	Will Rodgers	Joey Gase Motorsports	Chevrolet
54	Taylor Gray (CC)	Joe Gibbs Racing	Toyota
55	Joey Gase	Joey Gase Motorsports	Ford
87	Nick Sanchez (i)	Peterson Racing	Chevrolet
88	Rajah Caruth (CC)	JR Motorsports	Chevrolet
91	Leland Honeyman (i)	DGM Racing	Chevrolet
92	Josh Williams	DGM Racing	Chevrolet
96	Anthony Alfredo	Viking Motorsports	Chevrolet
99	Parker Retzlaff (CC)	Viking Motorsports	Chevrolet
Official entry list

== Practice ==
The first and only practice session was held on Saturday, October 17, at 11:00 AM MST, and lasted for 50 minutes.

Brent Crews, driving for Joe Gibbs Racing, set the fastest time in the session, with a lap of 27.969 seconds, and a speed of 128.714 miles per hour (207.145 km/h).

=== Practice results ===
Pos.	#	Driver	Team	Make	Time	Speed
1	19	Brent Crews (R) (OC)	Joe Gibbs Racing	Toyota	27.969	128.714
2	54	Taylor Gray (CC)	Joe Gibbs Racing	Toyota	28.039	128.393
3	18	William Sawalich	Joe Gibbs Racing	Toyota	28.095	128.137
Full practice results

== Qualifying ==
Qualifying was held on Saturday, October 17, at 12:05 PM MST. Since Phoenix Raceway is a mile oval, the qualifying procedure used was a single-car, one-lap system with one round. Drivers were on track by themselves and had one lap to post a qualifying time, and whoever set the fastest time won the pole.

Jesse Love, driving for Richard Childress Racing, qualified on pole position with a lap of 27.336 seconds, and a speed of 131.694 miles per hour (211.941 km/h).

No drivers failed to qualify.

=== Qualifying results ===
Pos.	#	Driver	Team	Make	Time	Speed
1	2	Jesse Love (CC)	Richard Childress Racing	Chevrolet	27.336	131.694
2	20	Brandon Jones (CC)	Joe Gibbs Racing	Toyota	27.576	130.548
3	18	William Sawalich	Joe Gibbs Racing	Toyota	27.580	130.529
4	00	Sheldon Creed (CC)	Haas Factory Team	Chevrolet	27.620	130.340
5	54	Taylor Gray (CC)	Joe Gibbs Racing	Toyota	27.652	130.189
6	88	Rajah Caruth (CC)	JR Motorsports	Chevrolet	27.669	130.110
7	87	Nick Sanchez (i)	Peterson Racing	Chevrolet	27.679	130.063
8	19	Brent Crews (OC) (R)	Joe Gibbs Racing	Toyota	27.720	129.870
9	8	Sammy Smith (CC)	JR Motorsports	Chevrolet	27.749	129.734
10	21	Austin Hill (CC)	Richard Childress Racing	Chevrolet	27.762	129.674
11	17	Corey Day (CC)	Hendrick Motorsports	Chevrolet	27.820	129.403
12	39	Ryan Sieg	RSS Racing	Chevrolet	27.821	129.399
13	7	Justin Allgaier (CC)	JR Motorsports	Chevrolet	27.830	129.357
14	31	Blaine Perkins	Jordan Anderson Racing	Chevrolet	27.839	129.315
15	96	Anthony Alfredo	Viking Motorsports	Chevrolet	27.874	129.153
16	1	Carson Kvapil (CC)	JR Motorsports	Chevrolet	27.875	129.148
17	26	Dean Thompson	Sam Hunt Racing	Toyota	27.891	129.074
18	99	Parker Retzlaff (CC)	Viking Motorsports	Chevrolet	27.902	129.023
19	51	Jeremy Clements	Jeremy Clements Racing	Chevrolet	27.911	128.981
20	91	Leland Honeyman (i)	DGM Racing	Chevrolet	27.947	128.815
21	28	Kyle Sieg	RSS Racing	Chevrolet	27.973	128.696
22	27	Jeb Burton	Jordan Anderson Racing	Chevrolet	28.067	128.265
23	92	Josh Williams	DGM Racing	Chevrolet	28.117	128.036
24	53	Will Rodgers	Joey Gase Motorsports	Chevrolet	28.163	127.827
25	32	Andrew Patterson	Jordan Anderson Racing	Chevrolet	28.200	127.660
26	44	Brennan Poole	Alpha Prime Racing	Ford	28.387	126.819
27	48	Patrick Staropoli (R)	Big Machine Racing	Chevrolet	28.397	126.774
28	02	Ryan Ellis	Young's Motorsports	Chevrolet	28.447	126.551
29	9	Jake Finch	JR Motorsports	Chevrolet	28.519	126.232
30	45	Lavar Scott (R)	Alpha Prime Racing	Chevrolet	28.526	126.201
31	43	Connor Mosack (i)	SPS Racing	Chevrolet	28.591	125.914
32	07	Josh Bilicki	SS-Green Light Racing	Chevrolet	28.669	125.571
Qualified by owner's points
33	47	Dawson Cram	Mike Harmon Racing	Chevrolet	28.839	124.831
34	0	Garrett Smithley	SS-Green Light Racing	Chevrolet	28.912	124.516
35	41	Sam Mayer (CC)	Haas Factory Team	Chevrolet	—	—
36	24	Harrison Burton	Sam Hunt Racing	Toyota	—	—
37	42	Brad Perez	Young's Motorsports	Chevrolet	—	—
38	55	Joey Gase	Joey Gase Motorsports	Ford	—	—
Official qualifying results
Official starting lineup

== Race ==
=== Race results ===
==== Stage Results ====
Stage One Laps: 45

Pos.	#	Driver	Team	Make	Pts
1	2	Jesse Love (CC)	Richard Childress Racing	Chevrolet	10
2	00	Sheldon Creed (CC)	Haas Factory Team	Chevrolet	9
3	7	Justin Allgaier (CC)	JR Motorsports	Chevrolet	8
4	88	Rajah Caruth (CC)	JR Motorsports	Chevrolet	7
5	8	Sammy Smith (CC)	JR Motorsports	Chevrolet	6
6	41	Sam Mayer (CC)	Haas Factory Team	Chevrolet	5
7	1	Carson Kvapil (CC)	JR Motorsports	Chevrolet	4
8	51	Jeremy Clements	Jeremy Clements Racing	Chevrolet	3
9	54	Taylor Gray (CC)	Joe Gibbs Racing	Toyota	2
10	17	Corey Day (CC)	Hendrick Motorsports	Chevrolet	1

Stage Two Laps: 45

Pos.	#	Driver	Team	Make	Pts
1	2	Jesse Love (CC)	Richard Childress Racing	Chevrolet	10
2	7	Justin Allgaier (CC)	JR Motorsports	Chevrolet	9
3	54	Taylor Gray (CC)	Joe Gibbs Racing	Toyota	8
4	17	Corey Day (CC)	Hendrick Motorsports	Chevrolet	7
5	41	Sam Mayer (CC)	Haas Factory Team	Chevrolet	6
6	88	Rajah Caruth (CC)	JR Motorsports	Chevrolet	5
7	8	Sammy Smith (CC)	JR Motorsports	Chevrolet	4
8	1	Carson Kvapil (CC)	JR Motorsports	Chevrolet	3
9	21	Austin Hill (CC)	Richard Childress Racing	Chevrolet	2
10	26	Dean Thompson	Sam Hunt Racing	Toyota	1

=== Final Stage Results ===
Stage Three Laps: 110

Fin	St	#	Driver	Team	Make	Laps	Led	Status	Pts
1	1	2	Jesse Love (CC)	Richard Childress Racing	Chevrolet	200	156	Running	75
2	35	41	Sam Mayer (CC)	Haas Factory Team	Chevrolet	200	0	Running	46
3	13	7	Justin Allgaier (CC)	JR Motorsports	Chevrolet	200	18	Running	52
4	11	17	Corey Day (CC)	Hendrick Motorsports	Chevrolet	200	7	Running	41
5	9	8	Sammy Smith (CC)	JR Motorsports	Chevrolet	200	0	Running	42
6	2	20	Brandon Jones (CC)	Joe Gibbs Racing	Toyota	200	0	Running	31
7	17	26	Dean Thompson	Sam Hunt Racing	Toyota	200	0	Running	31
8	3	18	William Sawalich	Joe Gibbs Racing	Toyota	200	0	Running	29
9	6	88	Rajah Caruth (CC)	JR Motorsports	Chevrolet	200	0	Running	40
10	16	1	Carson Kvapil (CC)	JR Motorsports	Chevrolet	200	0	Running	34
11	18	99	Parker Retzlaff (CC)	Viking Motorsports	Chevrolet	200	9	Running	26
12	19	51	Jeremy Clements	Jeremy Clements Racing	Chevrolet	200	1	Running	28
13	36	24	Harrison Burton	Sam Hunt Racing	Toyota	200	0	Running	24
14	25	32	Andrew Patterson	Jordan Anderson Racing	Chevrolet	200	0	Running	23
15	10	21	Austin Hill (CC)	Richard Childress Racing	Chevrolet	200	0	Running	24
16	22	27	Jeb Burton	Jordan Anderson Racing	Chevrolet	200	0	Running	21
17	15	96	Anthony Alfredo	Viking Motorsports	Chevrolet	200	0	Running	20
18	28	02	Ryan Ellis	Young's Motorsports	Chevrolet	200	0	Running	19
19	30	45	Lavar Scott (R)	Alpha Prime Racing	Chevrolet	200	0	Running	18
20	8	19	Brent Crews (OC) (R)	Joe Gibbs Racing	Toyota	199	1	Running	17
21	27	48	Patrick Staropoli (R)	Big Machine Racing	Chevrolet	199	0	Running	16
22	7	87	Nick Sanchez (i)	Peterson Racing	Chevrolet	199	0	Running	0
23	12	39	Ryan Sieg	RSS Racing	Chevrolet	199	0	Running	14
24	14	31	Blaine Perkins	Jordan Anderson Racing	Chevrolet	199	0	Running	13
25	21	28	Kyle Sieg	RSS Racing	Chevrolet	199	0	Running	12
26	23	92	Josh Williams	DGM Racing	Chevrolet	199	0	Running	11
27	37	42	Brad Perez	Young's Motorsports	Chevrolet	199	0	Running	10
28	5	54	Taylor Gray (CC)	Joe Gibbs Racing	Toyota	199	0	Running	19
29	24	53	Will Rodgers	Joey Gase Motorsports	Chevrolet	198	0	Running	8
30	31	43	Connor Mosack (i)	SPS Racing	Chevrolet	198	0	Running	0
31	34	0	Garrett Smithley	SS-Green Light Racing	Chevrolet	198	0	Running	6
32	4	00	Sheldon Creed (CC)	Haas Factory Team	Chevrolet	198	8	Running	14
33	38	55	Joey Gase	Joey Gase Motorsports	Ford	198	0	Running	4
34	20	91	Leland Honeyman (i)	DGM Racing	Chevrolet	197	0	Running	0
35	26	44	Brennan Poole	Alpha Prime Racing	Ford	197	0	Running	2
36	32	07	Josh Bilicki	SS-Green Light Racing	Chevrolet	179	0	Brakes	1
37	33	47	Dawson Cram	Mike Harmon Racing	Chevrolet	126	0	Fuel Pump	1
38	29	9	Jake Finch	JR Motorsports	Chevrolet	54	0	Engine	1
Official race results

=== Race statistics ===
- Lead changes: 18 among 7 different drivers
- Cautions/Laps: 5 for 35 laps
- Red flags: 0
- Time of race: 2 hours, 4 minutes and 31 seconds
- Average speed: 96.373 miles per hour (155.097 km/h)

== Standings after the race ==
Drivers' Championship standings

	Pos	Driver	Points
1	1	Jesse Love	2,367
2	2	Justin Allgaier	2,331 (–36)
	3	Corey Day	2,328 (–39)
3	4	Sheldon Creed	2,308 (–59)
	5	Carson Kvapil	2,288 (–79)
	6	Sam Mayer	2,281 (–86)
2	7	Sammy Smith	2,230 (–137)
1	8	Taylor Gray	2,226 (–141)
1	9	Austin Hill	2,224 (–143)
	10	Parker Retzlaff	2,194 (–173)
	11	Brandon Jones	2,184 (–183)
	12	Rajah Caruth	2,154 (–213)
Official driver's standings

Manufacturers' Championship standings

Pos	Manufacturer	Points
1	Chevrolet	1,589
2	Toyota	1,026 (–563)
3	Ford	281 (–1,308)

- Note: Only the first 12 positions are included for the driver standings.

Previous race: 2026 Blue Cross NC 300	NASCAR O'Reilly Auto Parts Series; 2026 season	Next race: 2026 TPG 250
