= 2024 Credit One NASCAR Amex Credit Card 300 =

31st race of the 2024 NASCAR Xfinity Series

Race details
- Race 31 of 33 in the 2024 NASCAR Xfinity Series
- Date: October 26, 2024
- Location: Homestead–Miami Speedway in Homestead, Florida
- Course: Permanent racing facility
- Course length: 1.5 miles (2.4 km)
- Distance: 200 laps, 300 mi (482 km)
- Scheduled distance: 200 laps, 300 mi (482 km)
- Average speed: 128.220 mph (206.350 km/h)

Pole position
Driver	Chandler Smith	Joe Gibbs Racing
- Time: 33.067

Most laps led
Driver	Austin Hill	Richard Childress Racing
- Laps: 82

Winner
No. 21	Austin Hill	Richard Childress Racing

Television in the United States
- Network: The CW (produced by NBC Sports)
- Announcers: Rick Allen, Jeff Burton, and Steve Letarte.

Radio in the United States
- Radio: MRN

The 2024 Credit One NASCAR Amex Credit Card 300 was the 31st stock car race of the 2024 NASCAR Xfinity Series, the fifth race of the Playoffs, the second race of the Round of 8. The race was held on October 26, 2024, at Homestead–Miami Speedway in Homestead, Florida, a 1.5 miles (2.4 km) permanent oval shaped intermediate speedway. The race took the scheduled 200 laps to complete. In an action-packed race, Austin Hill, driving for Richard Childress Racing, would pass Cole Custer for the lead in the final stages, and went on to have a dominating performance, leading a race-high 82 laps and winning both stages to earn his 10th career NASCAR Xfinity Series win, and his fourth of the season. With his win, he would also clinch a spot in the Championship 4. To fill out the podium, Custer, driving for Stewart–Haas Racing, and Aric Almirola, driving for Joe Gibbs Racing, would finish 2nd and 3rd, respectively.

== Report ==
=== Background ===
Homestead–Miami Speedway, the track where the race was held.

Homestead–Miami Speedway is a motor racing track located in Homestead, Florida. The track, which has several configurations, has promoted several series of racing, including NASCAR, the NTT IndyCar Series, and the Grand-Am Rolex Sports Car Series.

From 2002 to 2019, Homestead–Miami Speedway has hosted the final race of the season in all three of NASCAR's series: the NASCAR Cup Series, Xfinity Series and Craftsman Truck Series; due to Ford Motor Company sponsoring all three races the weekend was known as the 'Ford Championship Weekend'. The track has since held races on different dates in 2020 (June) and 2021 (February), which were both effected by the COVID-19 pandemic, before being moved back into the Playoffs as the second race of the Round of 8 in 2022, with the date being kept for 2023.

==== Entry list ====
- (R) denotes rookie driver.
- (i) denotes driver who is ineligible for series driver points.
- (P) denotes playoff driver.
- (OP) denotes owner's playoff car.

#	Driver	Team	Make
00	Cole Custer (P)	Stewart–Haas Racing	Ford
1	Sam Mayer (P)	JR Motorsports	Chevrolet
2	Jesse Love (R) (P)	Richard Childress Racing	Chevrolet
5	Anthony Alfredo	Our Motorsports	Chevrolet
07	Brad Perez	SS-Green Light Racing	Chevrolet
7	Justin Allgaier (P)	JR Motorsports	Chevrolet
8	Sammy Smith (P)	JR Motorsports	Chevrolet
9	Brandon Jones	JR Motorsports	Chevrolet
11	Josh Williams	Kaulig Racing	Chevrolet
14	Austin Green	SS-Green Light Racing	Chevrolet
15	Dylan Lupton	AM Racing	Ford
16	A. J. Allmendinger (P)	Kaulig Racing	Chevrolet
18	Sheldon Creed	Joe Gibbs Racing	Toyota
19	William Sawalich (i)	Joe Gibbs Racing	Toyota
20	Aric Almirola (OP)	Joe Gibbs Racing	Toyota
21	Austin Hill (P)	Richard Childress Racing	Chevrolet
26	Ryan Truex	Sam Hunt Racing	Toyota
27	Jeb Burton	Jordan Anderson Racing	Chevrolet
28	Ryan Sieg	RSS Racing	Ford
29	Blaine Perkins	RSS Racing	Ford
31	Parker Retzlaff	Jordan Anderson Racing	Chevrolet
35	Armani Williams	Joey Gase Motorsports	Ford
38	Matt DiBenedetto	RSS Racing	Ford
39	Kyle Sieg	RSS Racing	Ford
42	Leland Honeyman (R)	Young's Motorsports	Chevrolet
43	Ryan Ellis	Alpha Prime Racing	Chevrolet
44	Brennan Poole	Alpha Prime Racing	Chevrolet
45	Mason Maggio (i)	Alpha Prime Racing	Chevrolet
48	Parker Kligerman	Big Machine Racing	Chevrolet
51	Jeremy Clements	Jeremy Clements Racing	Chevrolet
53	Thomas Annunziata	Joey Gase Motorsports	Chevrolet
74	Dawson Cram (i)	Mike Harmon Racing	Chevrolet
81	Chandler Smith (P)	Joe Gibbs Racing	Toyota
88	Connor Zilisch	JR Motorsports	Chevrolet
91	Kyle Weatherman	DGM Racing	Chevrolet
92	Nick Leitz	DGM Racing	Chevrolet
97	Shane van Gisbergen (R)	Kaulig Racing	Chevrolet
98	Riley Herbst	Stewart–Haas Racing	Ford
Official entry list

== Practice ==
The first and only practice session was held on Friday, October 25, at 4:05 PM EST, and would last for 20 minutes. Connor Zilisch, driving for JR Motorsports, and Aric Almirola, driving for Joe Gibbs Racing, would set the fastest time in the session, with both drivers getting a lap of 33.629, and a speed of 160.576 mph (258.422 km/h).

Pos.	#	Driver	Team	Make	Time	Speed
1	88	Connor Zilisch	JR Motorsports	Chevrolet	33.629	160.576
2	20	Aric Almirola (OP)	Joe Gibbs Racing	Toyota	33.629	160.576
3	98	Riley Herbst	Stewart–Haas Racing	Ford	33.652	160.466
Full practice results

== Qualifying ==
Qualifying was held on Friday, October 25, at 4:40 PM EST. Since Homestead–Miami Speedway is an intermediate racetrack, the qualifying system used is a single-car, one-lap system with only one round. Drivers will be on track by themselves and will have one lap to post a qualifying time, and whoever sets the fastest time will win the pole.

Chandler Smith, driving for Joe Gibbs Racing, would score the pole for the race, with a lap of 33.067, and a speed of 163.305 mph (262.814 km/h).

No drivers would fail to qualify.

=== Qualifying results ===
Pos.	#	Driver	Team	Make	Time	Speed
1	81	Chandler Smith (P)	Joe Gibbs Racing	Toyota	33.067	163.305
2	18	Sheldon Creed	Joe Gibbs Racing	Toyota	33.165	162.822
3	20	Aric Almirola (OP)	Joe Gibbs Racing	Toyota	33.180	162.749
4	00	Cole Custer (P)	Stewart–Haas Racing	Ford	33.219	162.558
5	7	Justin Allgaier (P)	JR Motorsports	Chevrolet	33.220	162.553
6	16	A. J. Allmendinger (P)	Kaulig Racing	Chevrolet	33.298	162.172
7	48	Parker Kligerman	Big Machine Racing	Chevrolet	33.357	161.885
8	98	Riley Herbst	Stewart–Haas Racing	Ford	33.419	161.585
9	1	Sam Mayer (P)	JR Motorsports	Chevrolet	33.461	161.382
10	8	Sammy Smith (P)	JR Motorsports	Chevrolet	33.473	161.324
11	31	Parker Retzlaff	Jordan Anderson Racing	Chevrolet	33.476	161.310
12	19	William Sawalich (i)	Joe Gibbs Racing	Toyota	33.482	161.281
13	88	Connor Zilisch	JR Motorsports	Chevrolet	33.495	161.218
14	2	Jesse Love (R) (P)	Richard Childress Racing	Chevrolet	33.532	161.040
15	27	Jeb Burton	Jordan Anderson Racing	Chevrolet	33.557	160.920
16	21	Austin Hill (P)	Richard Childress Racing	Chevrolet	33.562	160.896
17	28	Ryan Sieg	RSS Racing	Ford	33.628	160.580
18	5	Anthony Alfredo	Our Motorsports	Chevrolet	33.749	160.005
19	44	Brennan Poole	Alpha Prime Racing	Chevrolet	33.801	159.759
20	9	Brandon Jones	JR Motorsports	Chevrolet	33.827	159.636
21	91	Kyle Weatherman	DGM Racing	Chevrolet	33.833	159.607
22	26	Ryan Truex	Sam Hunt Racing	Toyota	33.846	159.546
23	51	Jeremy Clements	Jeremy Clements Racing	Chevrolet	33.848	159.537
24	11	Josh Williams	Kaulig Racing	Chevrolet	33.900	159.292
25	97	Shane van Gisbergen (R)	Kaulig Racing	Chevrolet	34.141	158.168
26	42	Leland Honeyman (R)	Young's Motorsports	Chevrolet	34.149	158.131
27	39	Kyle Sieg	RSS Racing	Ford	34.221	157.798
28	07	Brad Perez	SS-Green Light Racing	Chevrolet	34.283	157.512
29	74	Dawson Cram (i)	Mike Harmon Racing	Chevrolet	34.289	157.485
30	15	Dylan Lupton	AM Racing	Ford	34.465	156.681
31	43	Ryan Ellis	Alpha Prime Racing	Chevrolet	34.474	156.640
32	45	Mason Maggio (i)	Alpha Prime Racing	Chevrolet	34.623	155.966
33	92	Nick Leitz	DGM Racing	Chevrolet	34.629	155.939
Qualified by owner's points
34	14	Austin Green	SS-Green Light Racing	Chevrolet	34.641	155.885
35	29	Blaine Perkins	RSS Racing	Ford	34.752	155.387
36	53	Thomas Annunziata	Joey Gase Motorsports	Chevrolet	35.076	153.951
37	35	Armani Williams	Joey Gase Motorsports	Ford	37.080	145.631
38	38	Matt DiBenedetto	RSS Racing	Ford	–	–
Official qualifying results
Official starting lineup

== Race results ==
Stage 1 Laps: 45

Pos.	#	Driver	Team	Make	Pts
1	21	Austin Hill (P)	Richard Childress Racing	Chevrolet	10
2	20	Aric Almirola (OP)	Joe Gibbs Racing	Toyota	9
3	18	Sheldon Creed	Joe Gibbs Racing	Toyota	8
4	7	Justin Allgaier (P)	JR Motorsports	Chevrolet	7
5	00	Cole Custer (P)	Stewart–Haas Racing	Ford	6
6	1	Sam Mayer (P)	JR Motorsports	Chevrolet	5
7	16	A. J. Allmendinger (P)	Kaulig Racing	Chevrolet	4
8	98	Riley Herbst	Stewart–Haas Racing	Ford	3
9	81	Chandler Smith (P)	Joe Gibbs Racing	Toyota	2
10	28	Ryan Sieg	RSS Racing	Ford	1

Stage 2 Laps: 45

Pos.	#	Driver	Team	Make	Pts
1	21	Austin Hill (P)	Richard Childress Racing	Chevrolet	10
2	16	A. J. Allmendinger (P)	Kaulig Racing	Chevrolet	9
3	00	Cole Custer (P)	Stewart–Haas Racing	Ford	8
4	28	Ryan Sieg	RSS Racing	Ford	7
5	20	Aric Almirola (OP)	Joe Gibbs Racing	Toyota	6
6	18	Sheldon Creed	Joe Gibbs Racing	Toyota	5
7	7	Justin Allgaier (P)	JR Motorsports	Chevrolet	4
8	81	Chandler Smith (P)	Joe Gibbs Racing	Toyota	3
9	2	Jesse Love (R) (P)	Richard Childress Racing	Chevrolet	2
10	19	William Sawalich (i)	Joe Gibbs Racing	Toyota	0

Stage 3 Laps: 110

Pos.	St.	#	Driver	Team	Make	Laps	Led	Status	Pts
1	16	21	Austin Hill (P)	Richard Childress Racing	Chevrolet	200	82	Running	60
2	4	00	Cole Custer (P)	Stewart–Haas Racing	Ford	200	67	Running	49
3	3	20	Aric Almirola (OP)	Joe Gibbs Racing	Toyota	200	1	Running	49
4	14	2	Jesse Love (R) (P)	Richard Childress Racing	Chevrolet	200	0	Running	35
5	2	18	Sheldon Creed	Joe Gibbs Racing	Toyota	200	12	Running	45
6	8	98	Riley Herbst	Stewart–Haas Racing	Ford	200	0	Running	34
7	17	28	Ryan Sieg	RSS Racing	Ford	200	0	Running	38
8	5	7	Justin Allgaier (P)	JR Motorsports	Chevrolet	200	0	Running	40
9	9	1	Sam Mayer (P)	JR Motorsports	Chevrolet	200	0	Running	33
10	6	16	A. J. Allmendinger (P)	Kaulig Racing	Chevrolet	200	9	Running	40
11	7	48	Parker Kligerman	Big Machine Racing	Chevrolet	200	0	Running	26
12	13	88	Connor Zilisch	JR Motorsports	Chevrolet	200	0	Running	25
13	1	81	Chandler Smith (P)	Joe Gibbs Racing	Toyota	200	29	Running	29
14	21	91	Kyle Weatherman	DGM Racing	Chevrolet	200	0	Running	23
15	18	5	Anthony Alfredo	Our Motorsports	Chevrolet	200	0	Running	22
16	23	51	Jeremy Clements	Jeremy Clements Racing	Chevrolet	200	0	Running	21
17	25	97	Shane van Gisbergen (R)	Kaulig Racing	Chevrolet	199	0	Running	20
18	19	44	Brennan Poole	Alpha Prime Racing	Chevrolet	199	0	Running	19
19	20	9	Brandon Jones	JR Motorsports	Chevrolet	199	0	Running	18
20	15	27	Jeb Burton	Jordan Anderson Racing	Chevrolet	199	0	Running	17
21	22	26	Ryan Truex	Sam Hunt Racing	Toyota	199	0	Running	16
22	10	8	Sammy Smith (P)	JR Motorsports	Chevrolet	199	0	Running	15
23	11	31	Parker Retzlaff	Jordan Anderson Racing	Chevrolet	199	0	Running	14
24	12	19	William Sawalich (i)	Joe Gibbs Racing	Toyota	199	0	Running	0
25	31	43	Ryan Ellis	Alpha Prime Racing	Chevrolet	199	0	Running	12
26	27	39	Kyle Sieg	RSS Racing	Ford	199	0	Running	11
27	24	11	Josh Williams	DGM Racing	Chevrolet	197	0	Running	10
28	28	07	Brad Perez	SS-Green Light Racing	Chevrolet	197	0	Running	9
29	34	14	Austin Green	SS-Green Light Racing	Chevrolet	197	0	Running	8
30	26	42	Leland Honeyman (R)	Young's Motorsports	Chevrolet	197	0	Running	7
31	32	45	Mason Maggio (i)	Alpha Prime Racing	Chevrolet	197	0	Running	0
32	30	15	Dylan Lupton	AM Racing	Ford	196	0	Running	5
33	29	74	Dawson Cram (i)	Mike Harmon Racing	Chevrolet	196	0	Running	0
34	35	29	Blaine Perkins	RSS Racing	Ford	195	0	Running	3
35	37	35	Armani Williams	Joey Gase Motorsports	Ford	193	0	Running	2
36	36	53	Thomas Annunziata	Joey Gase Motorsports	Chevrolet	190	0	Ignition	1
37	33	92	Nick Leitz	DGM Racing	Chevrolet	87	0	Suspension	1
38	38	38	Matt DiBenedetto	RSS Racing	Ford	56	0	Overheating	1
Official race results

== Standings after the race ==
Drivers' Championship standings

	Pos	Driver	Points
	1	Justin Allgaier	3,128
	2	Cole Custer	3,121 (–7)
2	3	Austin Hill	3,116 (–12)
	4	A. J. Allmendinger	3,103 (–25)
2	5	Chandler Smith	3,093 (–35)
	6	Jesse Love	3,086 (–42)
	7	Sam Mayer	3,074 (–54)
	8	Sammy Smith	3,026 (–102)
	9	Sheldon Creed	2,176 (–952)
	10	Riley Herbst	2,160 (–968)
	11	Parker Kligerman	2,138 (–990)
	12	Shane van Gisbergen	2,123 (–1,005)
Official driver's standings

Manufacturers' Championship standings

Pos	Manufacturer	Points
1	Chevrolet	1,158
2	Toyota	1,098 (–60)
3	Ford	999 (–159)

- Note: Only the first 12 positions are included for the driver standings.

Previous race: 2024 Ambetter Health 302	NASCAR Xfinity Series; 2024 season	Next race: 2024 National Debt Relief 250
