= Leland Honeyman =

American racing driver (born 2005)

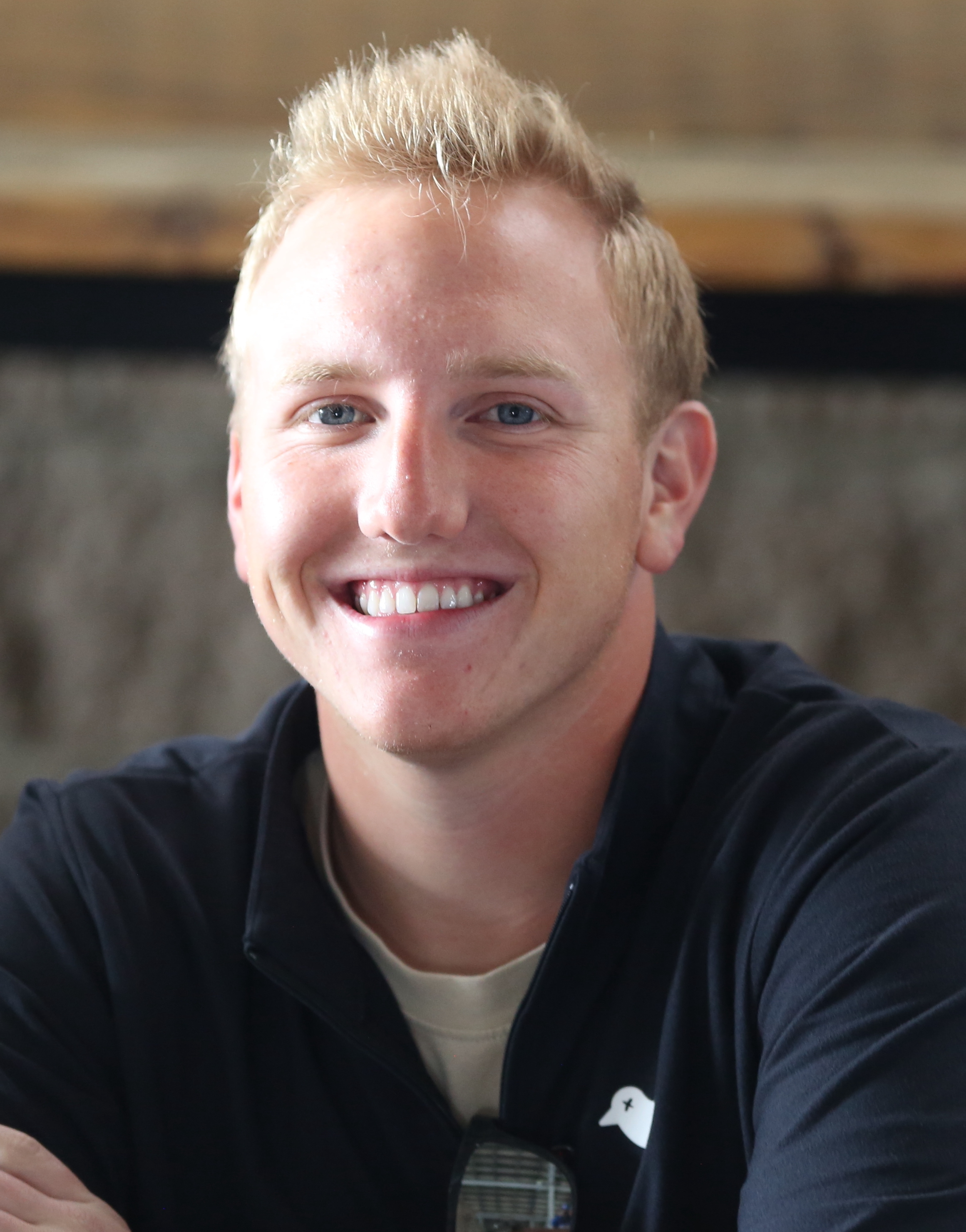
- Honeyman at Sonoma Raceway in 2024
- Born: Leland Dillon Honeyman Jr. February 23, 2005 (age 21); Phoenix, Arizona, U.S.
- Achievements: 2017 INEX Bandolero Bandit National Champion; 2021 Fall Brawl Winner (CPLMS)
- Awards: 2021 Carolina Pro Late Model Series Rookie of the Year

NASCAR O'Reilly Auto Parts Series career
- 69 races run over 4 years
- 2026 position: 79th
- Best finish: 22nd (2024)
- First race: 2023 United Rentals 200 (Phoenix)
- Last race: 2026 TPG 250 (Talladega)
| Wins | Top tens | Poles |
|---|---|---|
| 0 | 4 | 0 |

NASCAR FedEx Freight Truck Series career
- 7 races run over 2 years
- 2026 position: 44th
- Best finish: 44th (2026)
- First race: 2022 UNOH 200 (Bristol)
- Last race: 2026 Craftsman 200 (Homestead)
| Wins | Top tens | Poles |
|---|---|---|
| 0 | 0 | 0 |

ARCA Menards Series career
- 8 races run over 4 years
- Best finish: 35th (2025)
- First race: 2022 Calypso Lemonade 150 (Iowa)
- Last race: 2025 Reese's 150 (Kansas)
| Wins | Top tens | Poles |
|---|---|---|
| 0 | 5 | 0 |

ARCA Menards Series East career
- 8 races run over 2 years
- Best finish: 3rd (2022)
- First race: 2022 Race to Stop Suicide 200 (New Smyrna)
- Last race: 2025 Bush's Beans 200 (Bristol)
| Wins | Top tens | Poles |
|---|---|---|
| 0 | 6 | 1 |

ARCA Menards Series West career
- 2 races run over 2 years
- Best finish: 45th (2023)
- First race: 2023 General Tire 150 (Phoenix)
- Last race: 2025 Desert Diamond Casino West Valley 100 (Phoenix)
| Wins | Top tens | Poles |
|---|---|---|
| 0 | 2 | 0 |
- Statistics up to date as of November 7, 2026.

Leland Dillon Honeyman Jr. (born February 23, 2005) is an American professional stock car racing driver. He last competed part-time in the NASCAR Craftsman Truck Series, driving the No. 62 Toyota Tundra for Halmar Friesen Racing, and part-time in the NASCAR O'Reilly Auto Parts Series, driving the No. 71/91/92 Chevrolet Camaro SS for DGM Racing with Jesse Iwuji Motorsports. He has previously competed in the ARCA Menards Series.

== Racing career ==
=== Early career ===
Honeyman would first get his start racing quads at the age of two and would rise through the ranks to International Trophy Karts at the age of four. For three years, he would then make starts in Jr. Trucks and Off Road Jr. Trucks, winning three championships in the off-road series. On his eighth birthday, he would race his first go-kart race, winning three championships.

In 2017, Honeyman would win the Bandolero championship in INEX.

In 2021, Honeyman would finish runner-up to Nick Loden for the championship in the Carolina Pro Late Model Series.

Honeyman also competed in two races of the CARS Tour in 2019.

=== ARCA Menards Series East ===
On January 28, 2022, Honeyman was announced to race full-time for Young's Motorsports in the ARCA Menards Series East that year, driving the No. 02. He earned five top-tens throughout the season, and finished third in the points standings.

=== NASCAR Craftsman Truck Series ===
Honeyman lining up for qualifying at the Zero Carbon Bioethanol 150 Powered by POET at Phoenix Raceway.

Along with the January 28 announcement, Honeyman announced that he would attempt to make his first start in the NASCAR Camping World Truck Series in late 2022. He made his debut at Bristol Motor Speedway, starting 31st and finishing 29th.

In 2026, Honeyman drove for Halmar Friesen Racing in their No. 62 truck at Charlotte, where he finished 23rd. Christopher Bell was supposed to run the race at Richmond but would be replaced by Honeyman. His most recent race was the Zero Carbon Bioethanol 150 Powered by POET, where he finished 34th.

=== NASCAR Xfinity Series ===
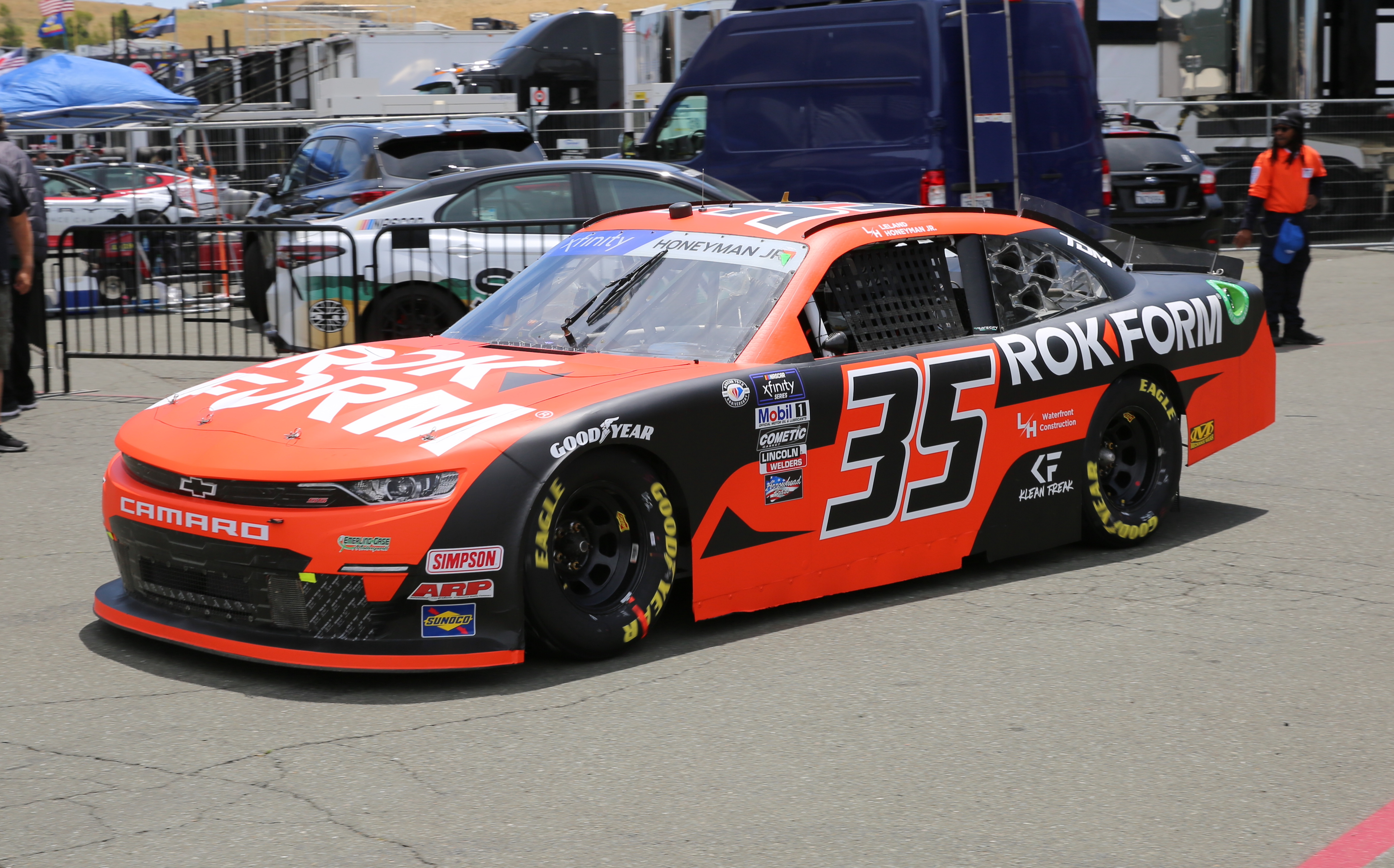
Honeyman's No. 35 car at Sonoma Raceway in 2023, he ended up failing to qualify.

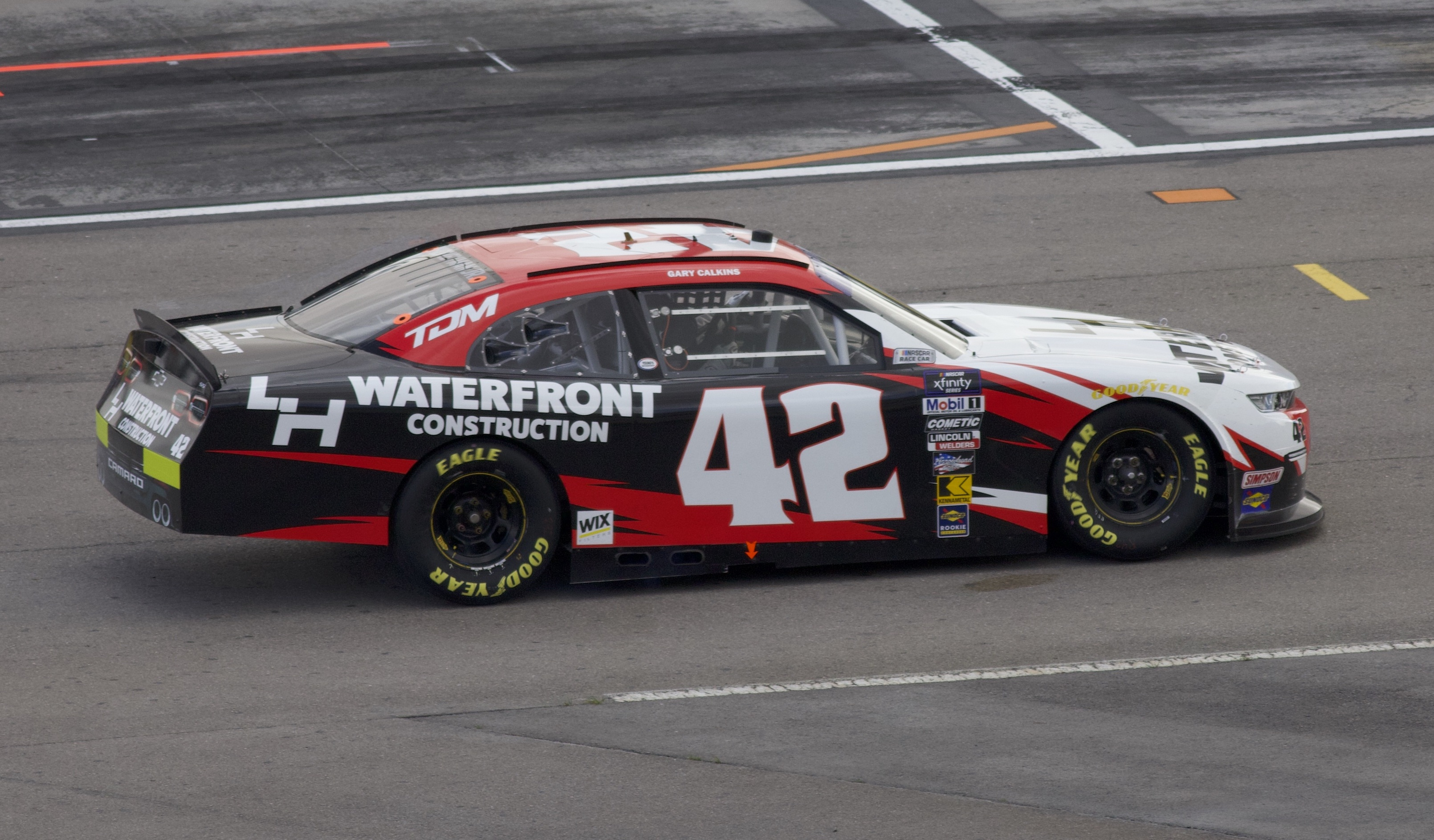
Honeyman's No. 42 car at Las Vegas Motor Speedway in 2024.

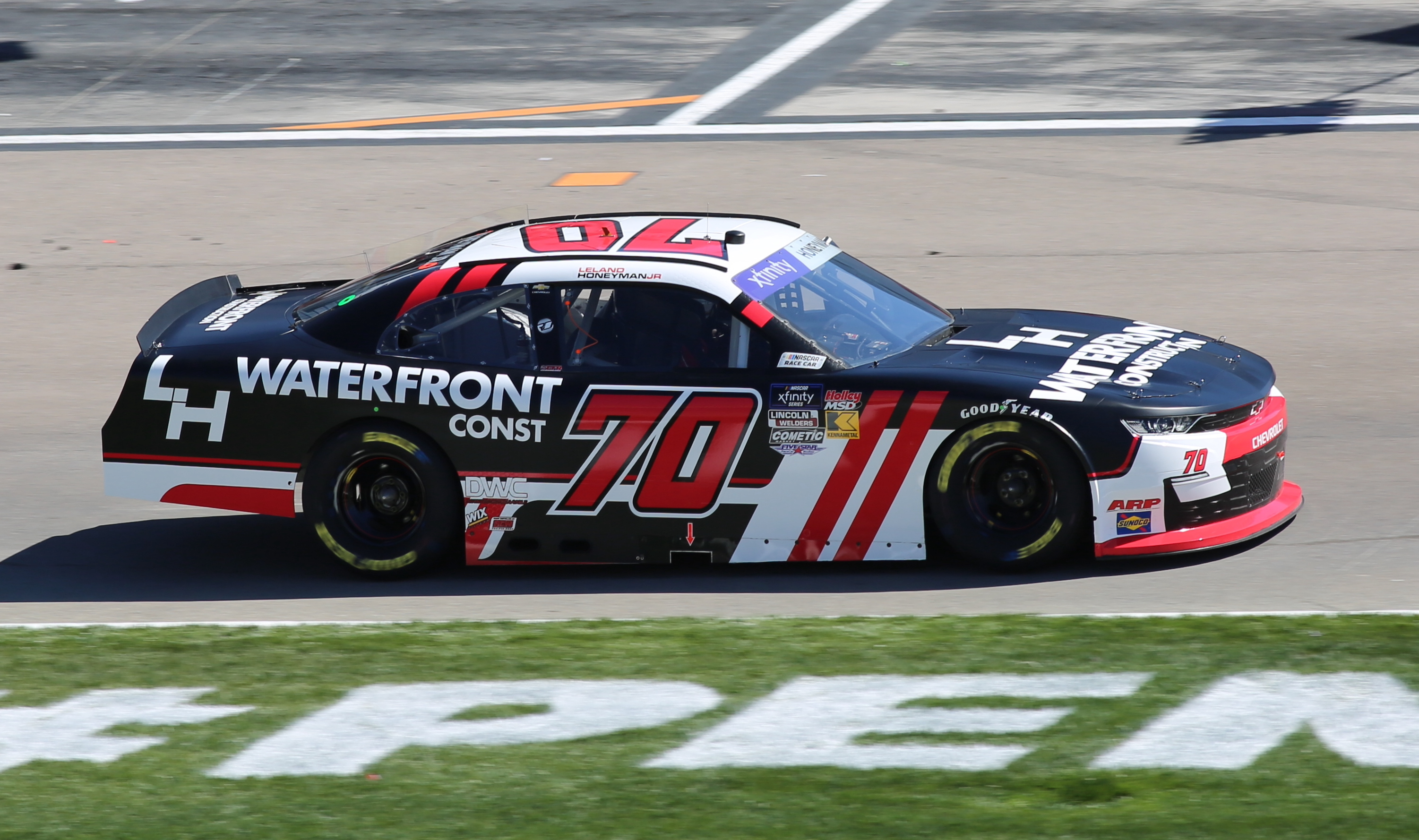
Honeyman's No. 70 car at Las Vegas Motor Speedway in 2025

On December 30, 2022, Alpha Prime Racing announced that Honeyman would join the organization part-time in the 2023 season, driving the 45 car. He made his debut at Phoenix Raceway, qualifying 23rd and finishing 27th. He followed with two 25th-place finishes at Richmond and Martinsville. At Portland, Honeyman qualified 21st but was replaced mid-race by Brad Perez, after suffering from food poisoning during the first stage. Perez ran inside the top-fifteen until the final corner, after getting punted into tire barriers by Josh Williams, resulting in a 28th-place finish. Since Honeyman started the race, he is officially credited with the finish. At Sonoma, Honeyman drove the 35 for Emerling-Gase Motorsports, in which he failed to qualify. In the race at Kansas in September, Honeyman failed to qualify driving Alpha Prime's No. 44 car, but the team worked a deal with MBM Motorsports to replace Timmy Hill in their No. 66 car, which did qualify for the race.

On January 3, 2024, it was announced that Young's Motorsports would expand to the Xfinity Series in 2024, fielding the No. 42 with Honeyman driving the car full-time. At Talladega, Honeyman scored a top-five, his first, with a fourth place finish.

On January 2, 2025, it was announced that Honeyman would move to the newly rebranded Cope Family Racing team to drive the No. 70 Chevrolet SS part-time, sharing the ride with Thomas Annunziata. Honeyman would drive in seventeen races and Annunziata would drive in sixteen races.

== Motorsports career results ==
=== Racing career summary ===
| Season | Series | Team | Races | Wins | Top 5 | Top 10 | Points | Position |
|---|---|---|---|---|---|---|---|---|
| 2019 | CARS Late Model Stock Car Tour | Leland Honeyman | 2 | 0 | 0 | 0 | 25 | 43rd |
| 2021 | Carolina Pro Late Model Series | Lee Faulk Racing Development | 11 | 1 | ? | ? | ? | **2nd** |
| 2022 | ARCA Menards Series East | Young's Motorsports | 7 | 0 | 3 | 5 | 346 | **3rd** |
| 2022 | ARCA Menards Series | Young's Motorsports | 3 | 0 | 0 | 1 | 87 | 43rd |
| 2022 | NASCAR Camping World Truck Series | Young's Motorsports | 1 | 0 | 0 | 0 | 8 | 71st |
| 2023 | ARCA Menards Series West | Young's Motorsports | 1 | 0 | 0 | 1 | 37 | 45th |
| 2023 | ARCA Menards Series | Young's Motorsports | 1 | 0 | 0 | 1 | 36 | 79th |
| 2023 | NASCAR Xfinity Series | Alpha Prime Racing | 7 | 0 | 0 | 0 | 93 | 40th |
| 2023 | NASCAR Xfinity Series | Emerling-Gase Motorsports | 0 | 0 | 0 | 0 | 93 | 40th |
| 2023 | NASCAR Xfinity Series | MBM Motorsports | 1 | 0 | 0 | 0 | 93 | 40th |
| 2024 | ARCA Menards Series | Young's Motorsports | 1 | 0 | 0 | 0 | 13 | 112th |
| 2024 | NASCAR Xfinity Series | Young's Motorsports | 33 | 0 | 1 | 2 | 457 | 22nd |
| 2025 | ARCA Menards Series West | Nitro Motorsports | 1 | 0 | 1 | 1 | 39 | 46th |
| 2025 | ARCA Menards Series East | Venturini Motorsports | 1 | 0 | 1 | 1 | 40 | 49th |
| 2025 | ARCA Menards Series | Venturini Motorsports | 3 | 0 | 3 | 3 | 122 | 35th |
| 2025 | NASCAR Xfinity Series | Cope Family Racing | 17 | 0 | 0 | 2 | 242 | 31st |
| 2025 | NASCAR Xfinity Series | DGM Racing | 1 | 0 | 0 | 0 | 242 | 31st |
| 2026 | NASCAR Craftsman Truck Series | Halmar Friesen Racing | 6 | 0 | 0 | 0 | 59 | 44th |
| 2026 | NASCAR O'Reilly Auto Parts Series | DGM Racing | 10 | 0 | 0 | 0 | 0 | NC† |

^{†} As Honeyman was a guest driver, he was ineligible for championship points.

=== NASCAR ===
(key) (Bold – Pole position awarded by qualifying time. Italics – Pole position earned by points standings or practice time. * – Most laps led.)

==== O'Reilly Auto Parts Series ====
NASCAR O'Reilly Auto Parts Series results
| Year | Team | No. | Make | 1 | 2 | 3 | 4 | 5 | 6 | 7 | 8 | 9 | 10 | 11 | 12 | 13 | 14 | 15 | 16 | 17 | 18 | 19 | 20 | 21 | 22 | 23 | 24 | 25 | 26 | 27 | 28 | 29 | 30 | 31 | 32 | 33 | NOAPSC | Pts | Ref |
|---|---|---|---|---|---|---|---|---|---|---|---|---|---|---|---|---|---|---|---|---|---|---|---|---|---|---|---|---|---|---|---|---|---|---|---|---|---|---|---|
| 2023 | Alpha Prime Racing | 45 | Chevy | DAY | CAL | LVS | PHO; 27 | ATL | COA | RCH; 25 | MAR; 25 | TAL | DOV | DAR | CLT | | | | | | | | ROA; 28 | MCH | IRC | GLN | DAY | DAR | | | | ROV; 21 | LVS | HOM; 23 | MAR | | 40th | 93 | |
| 2023 | Alpha Prime Racing | 43 | Chevy | | | | | | | | | | | | | PIR; 28 | | | | | | | | | | | | | | | | | | | | | 40th | 93 | |
| 2023 | Emerling-Gase Motorsports | 35 | Chevy | | | | | | | | | | | | | | SON; DNQ | NSH | CSC | ATL | NHA | POC | | | | | | | | | | | | | | | 40th | 93 | |
| 2023 | Alpha Prime Racing | 44 | Chevy | | | | | | | | | | | | | | | | | | | | | | | | | | KAN; DNQ | | | | | | | PHO; DNQ | 40th | 93 | |
| 2023 | MBM Motorsports | 66 | Ford | | | | | | | | | | | | | | | | | | | | | | | | | | KAN; 26 | BRI | TEX | | | | | | 40th | 93 | |
| 2024 | Young's Motorsports | 42 | Chevy | DAY; 30 | ATL; 21 | LVS; 18 | PHO; 11 | COA; 20 | RCH; 20 | MAR; 31 | TEX; 31 | TAL; 4 | DOV; 21 | DAR; 30 | CLT; 23 | PIR; 26 | SON; 29 | IOW; 13 | NHA; 37 | NSH; 25 | CSC; 31 | POC; 25 | IND; 20 | MCH; 12 | DAY; 9 | DAR; 23 | ATL; 17 | GLN; 16 | BRI; 31 | KAN; 25 | TAL; 14 | ROV; 28 | LVS; 37 | HOM; 30 | MAR; 35 | PHO; 31 | 22nd | 457 | |
| 2025 | Cope Family Racing | 70 | Chevy | DAY; 21 | ATL; 8 | COA | PHO | LVS; 30 | HOM; 34 | MAR | DAR; 37 | BRI | CAR | TAL; 13 | TEX; 34 | CLT; 32 | NSH | MXC | POC; 24 | ATL; 12 | CSC | SON | DOV; 29 | IND; 26 | IOW | GLN | DAY; 26 | PIR | GTW | BRI; 32 | KAN; 21 | | | TAL; 8 | MAR | PHO; 24 | 31st | 242 | |
| 2025 | DGM Racing with Jesse Iwuji Motorsports | 92 | Chevy | | | | | | | | | | | | | | | | | | | | | | | | | | | | | ROV; 26 | LVS | | | | 31st | 242 | |
| 2026 | DGM Racing with Jesse Iwuji Motorsports | 92 | Chevy | DAY | ATL | COA | PHO | LVS | DAR | MAR | CAR | BRI | KAN | TAL | TEX | GLN | DOV | CLT; 15 | NSH; 22 | POC; 33 | COR; 26 | | CHI; 21 | ATL; 28 | IND | IOW | | | | | | | | | | | 79th | 0^{1} | |
| 2026 | DGM Racing with Jesse Iwuji Motorsports | 71 | Chevy | | | | | | | | | | | | | | | | | | | SON; 35 | | | | | DAY; 13 | DAR | GTW | BRI | LVS | CLT | | TAL; 36 | MAR | HOM | 79th | 0^{1} | |
| 2026 | DGM Racing with Jesse Iwuji Motorsports | 91 | Chevy | | | | | | | | | | | | | | | | | | | | | | | | | | | | | | PHO; 34 | | | | 79th | 0^{1} | |

==== Craftsman Truck Series ====
NASCAR Craftsman Truck Series results
| Year | Team | No. | Make | 1 | 2 | 3 | 4 | 5 | 6 | 7 | 8 | 9 | 10 | 11 | 12 | 13 | 14 | 15 | 16 | 17 | 18 | 19 | 20 | 21 | 22 | 23 | 24 | 25 | NCTC | Pts | Ref |
|---|---|---|---|---|---|---|---|---|---|---|---|---|---|---|---|---|---|---|---|---|---|---|---|---|---|---|---|---|---|---|---|
| 2022 | Young's Motorsports | 20 | Chevy | DAY | LVS | ATL | COA | MAR | BRI | DAR | KAN | TEX | CLT | GTW | SON | KNX | NSH | MOH | POC | IRP | RCH | KAN | BRI; 29 | TAL | HOM | PHO | | | 71st | 8 | |
| 2026 | Halmar Friesen Racing | 62 | Toyota | DAY | ATL | STP | DAR | CAR | BRI | TEX | GLN | DOV | CLT; 23 | NSH | MCH | COR | LRP | NWS | IRP | RCH; 17 | NHA | BRI | KAN; 30 | CLT; 30 | PHO; 34 | TAL | MAR | HOM; 29 | 44th | 59 | |

^{*} Season still in progress
^{1} Ineligible for series points

=== ARCA Menards Series ===
(key) (Bold – Pole position awarded by qualifying time. Italics – Pole position earned by points standings or practice time. * – Most laps led. ** – All laps led.)

ARCA Menards Series results
| Year | Team | No. | Make | 1 | 2 | 3 | 4 | 5 | 6 | 7 | 8 | 9 | 10 | 11 | 12 | 13 | 14 | 15 | 16 | 17 | 18 | 19 | 20 | AMSC | Pts | Ref |
|---|---|---|---|---|---|---|---|---|---|---|---|---|---|---|---|---|---|---|---|---|---|---|---|---|---|---|
| 2022 | Young's Motorsports | 02 | Chevy | DAY | PHO | TAL | KAN | CLT | IOW; 6 | BLN | ELK | MOH | POC | IRP | MCH | GLN | ISF | MLW; 11 | DSF | KAN | BRI; 28 | SLM | TOL | 43rd | 87 | |
| 2023 | Young's Motorsports | 02 | Chevy | DAY | PHO; 8 | TAL | KAN | CLT | BLN | ELK | MOH | IOW | POC | MCH | IRP | GLN | ISF | MLW | DSF | KAN | BRI | SLM | TOL | 79th | 36 | |
| 2024 | Young's Motorsports | 02 | Chevy | DAY; 31 | PHO | TAL | DOV | KAN | CLT | IOW | MOH | BLN | IRP | SLM | ELK | MCH | ISF | MLW | DSF | GLN | BRI | KAN | TOL | 112th | 13 | |
| 2025 | Venturini Motorsports | 20 | Toyota | DAY | PHO | TAL | KAN | CLT | MCH | BLN | ELK | LRP | DOV | IRP | IOW | GLN | ISF | MAD | DSF | BRI; 4 | SLM; 3 | KAN; 3 | TOL | 35th | 122 | |

==== ARCA Menards Series East ====
ARCA Menards Series East results
| Year | Team | No. | Make | 1 | 2 | 3 | 4 | 5 | 6 | 7 | 8 | AMSEC | Pts | Ref |
|---|---|---|---|---|---|---|---|---|---|---|---|---|---|---|
| 2022 | Young's Motorsports | 02 | Chevy | NSM; 4 | **FIF**; 2 | DOV; 8 | NSV; 5 | IOW; 6 | MLW; 11 | BRI; 28 | | 3rd | 346 | |
| 2025 | Venturini Motorsports | 20 | Toyota | FIF | CAR | NSV | FRS | DOV | IRP | IOW | BRI; 4 | 49th | 40 | |

==== ARCA Menards Series West ====
ARCA Menards Series West results
| Year | Team | No. | Make | 1 | 2 | 3 | 4 | 5 | 6 | 7 | 8 | 9 | 10 | 11 | 12 | 13 | AMSWC | Pts | Ref |
|---|---|---|---|---|---|---|---|---|---|---|---|---|---|---|---|---|---|---|---|
| 2023 | Young's Motorsports | 02 | Chevy | PHO; 8 | IRW | KCR | PIR | SON | IRW | SHA | EVG | AAS | LVS | MAD | PHO | | 45th | 37 | |
| 2025 | Nitro Motorsports | 20 | Toyota | KER | PHO | TUC | CNS | KER | SON | TRI | PIR | AAS | MAD | LVS | PHO; 5 | | 46th | 39 | |

=== CARS Late Model Stock Car Tour ===
(key) (Bold – Pole position awarded by qualifying time. Italics – Pole position earned by points standings or practice time. * – Most laps led. ** – All laps led.)

CARS Late Model Stock Car Tour results
| Year | Team | No. | Make | 1 | 2 | 3 | 4 | 5 | 6 | 7 | 8 | 9 | 10 | 11 | CLMSCTC | Pts | Ref |
|---|---|---|---|---|---|---|---|---|---|---|---|---|---|---|---|---|---|
| 2019 | Leland Honeyman | 4H | Chevy | SNM; DNQ | HCY; 21 | ROU | ACE; 24 | MMS | LGY | DOM | CCS | HCY; DNQ | ROU | SBO | 43rd | 25 | |

Sporting positions
| Preceded by Clay Thompson | INEX Bandolero Bandit National Champion; 2017 | Succeeded by Landon Rapp |
Achievements
| Preceded by Kyle Campbell | Fall Brawl Pro Late Model Winner; 2021 | Succeeded by Caden Kvapil |
