= 2024 Drive for the Cure 250 =

29th race of the 2024 NASCAR Xfinity Series

2024 Drive for the Cure 250 presented by BlueCross BlueShield of North Carolina
Race details
- Race 29 of 33 in the 2024 NASCAR Xfinity Series
- Date: October 12, 2024
- Location: Charlotte Motor Speedway in Concord, North Carolina
- Course: Permanent racing facility
- Course length: 2.32 miles (3.73 km)
- Distance: 72 laps, 167 mi (268 km)
- Scheduled distance: 67 laps, 155 mi (250 km)
- Average speed: 66.290 mph (106.683 km/h)

Pole position
Driver	Shane van Gisbergen	Kaulig Racing
- Time: 1:24.523

Most laps led
Driver	A. J. Allmendinger	Kaulig Racing
- Laps: 18

Winner
No. 1	Sam Mayer	JR Motorsports

Television in the United States
- Network: The CW (produced by NBC Sports)
- Announcers: Rick Allen, Jeff Burton, and Steve Letarte.

Radio in the United States
- Radio: PRN

The 2024 Drive for the Cure 250 presented by BlueCross BlueShield of North Carolina was the 29th stock car race of the 2024 NASCAR Xfinity Series, the third race of the playoffs, the final race of the Round of 12, and the 7th iteration of the event. The race was held on October 12, 2024, at the Charlotte Motor Speedway roval layout in Concord, North Carolina, a 2.32 miles (3.73 km) permanent road course. The race was originally scheduled to be contested over 67 laps, but was extended to 72 laps due to an overtime finish. In an action-packed event that sparked late-race controversy, Sam Mayer, driving for JR Motorsports, would take away the lead from Parker Kligerman in a fierce battle on the final restart, and cruised the rest of the way to earn his seventh career NASCAR Xfinity Series win, and his third of the season. Mayer would also claim a spot in the next round of the playoffs. Although there were numerous lead changes, A. J. Allmendinger led a race-high 18 laps, finishing second behind eventual winner Mayer. To fill out the podium, Shane van Gisbergen, driving for Kaulig Racing, would finish 3rd, respectively.

Following the race, Gisbergen, Sheldon Creed, Riley Herbst, and Kligerman were eliminated from playoff contention. Justin Allgaier, Cole Custer, Austin Hill, Chandler Smith, Mayer, Jesse Love, Allmendinger, and Sammy Smith would advance into the Round of 8.

== Report ==
=== Background ===
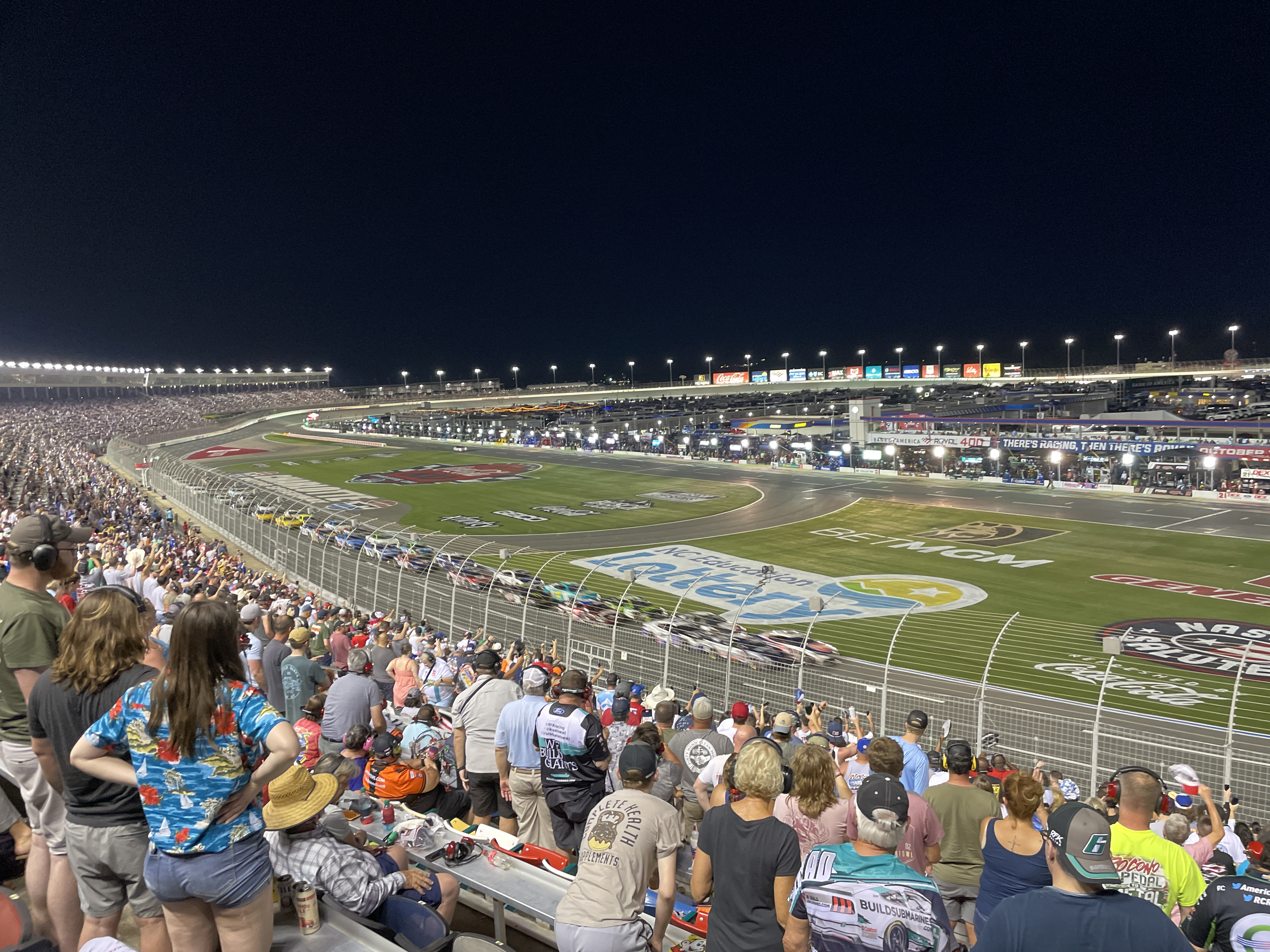
Charlotte Motor Speedway, the circuit where the race is held.

Since 2018, deviating from past NASCAR events at Charlotte, the race will utilize a road course configuration of Charlotte Motor Speedway, promoted and trademarked as the "Roval". The course is 2.28 miles (3.67 km) in length and features 17 turns, utilizing the infield road course and portions of the oval track. The race will be contested over a scheduled distance of 109 laps, 400 kilometres (250 mi).

During July 2018 tests on the road course, concerns were raised over drivers "cheating" the backstretch chicane on the course. The chicanes were modified with additional tire barriers and rumble strips in order to encourage drivers to properly drive through them, and NASCAR will enforce drive-through penalties on drivers who illegally "short-cut" parts of the course. The chicanes will not be used during restarts. In the summer of 2019, the bus stop on the backstretch was changed and deepened, becoming a permanent part of the circuit, compared to the previous year where it was improvised.

If a driver fails to legally make the backstretch bus stop, the driver must skip the frontstretch chicane and make a complete stop by the dotted line on the exit before being allowed to continue. A driver who misses the frontstretch chicane must stop before the exit.

On May 26, 2024, it was announced that the Charlotte Roval would get a redesign, featuring an updated infield road course which includes an extension of the straightaway after turn 5, a new turn 6, and a sharper hairpin for turn 7, in addition the apex for turn 16 on the final chicane was made tighter.

==== Entry list ====
- (R) denotes rookie driver.
- (i) denotes driver who is ineligible for series driver points.
- (P) denotes playoff driver.
- (OP) denotes owner's playoff car.

#	Driver	Team	Make
00	Cole Custer (P)	Stewart–Haas Racing	Ford
1	Sam Mayer (P)	JR Motorsports	Chevrolet
2	Jesse Love (R) (P)	Richard Childress Racing	Chevrolet
5	Anthony Alfredo	Our Motorsports	Chevrolet
07	Sage Karam	SS-Green Light Racing	Chevrolet
7	Justin Allgaier (P)	JR Motorsports	Chevrolet
8	Sammy Smith (P)	JR Motorsports	Chevrolet
9	Brandon Jones	JR Motorsports	Chevrolet
11	Josh Williams	Kaulig Racing	Chevrolet
14	Nathan Byrd	SS-Green Light Racing	Chevrolet
15	Dylan Lupton	AM Racing	Ford
16	A. J. Allmendinger (P)	Kaulig Racing	Chevrolet
18	Sheldon Creed (P)	Joe Gibbs Racing	Toyota
19	Josh Bilicki	Joe Gibbs Racing	Toyota
20	Aric Almirola (OP)	Joe Gibbs Racing	Toyota
21	Austin Hill (P)	Richard Childress Racing	Chevrolet
26	Ed Jones	Sam Hunt Racing	Toyota
27	Jeb Burton	Jordan Anderson Racing	Chevrolet
28	Ryan Sieg	RSS Racing	Ford
29	Blaine Perkins	RSS Racing	Ford
31	Parker Retzlaff	Jordan Anderson Racing	Chevrolet
32	Austin Green	Jordan Anderson Racing	Chevrolet
35	Thomas Annunziata	Joey Gase Motorsports	Toyota
38	Matt DiBenedetto	RSS Racing	Ford
39	Kyle Sieg	RSS Racing	Ford
42	Leland Honeyman (R)	Young's Motorsports	Chevrolet
43	Ryan Ellis	Alpha Prime Racing	Chevrolet
44	Brennan Poole	Alpha Prime Racing	Chevrolet
45	Brad Perez	Alpha Prime Racing	Chevrolet
48	Parker Kligerman (P)	Big Machine Racing	Chevrolet
50	Preston Pardus	Pardus Racing	Chevrolet
51	Jeremy Clements	Jeremy Clements Racing	Chevrolet
81	Chandler Smith (P)	Joe Gibbs Racing	Toyota
88	Connor Mosack (i)	JR Motorsports	Chevrolet
91	Alex Labbé	DGM Racing	Chevrolet
92	Dawson Cram (i)	DGM Racing	Chevrolet
97	Shane van Gisbergen (R) (P)	Kaulig Racing	Chevrolet
98	Riley Herbst (P)	Stewart–Haas Racing	Ford
Official entry list

== Practice ==
The first and only practice session was held on Saturday, October 12, at 10:00 AM EST, and would last for 50 minutes. Shane van Gisbergen, driving for Kaulig Racing, would set the fastest time in the session, with a lap of 1:25.221, and a speed of 96.314 mph (155.002 km/h).

Pos.	#	Driver	Team	Make	Time	Speed
1	97	Shane van Gisbergen (R) (P)	Kaulig Racing	Chevrolet	1:25.221	96.314
2	1	Sam Mayer (P)	JR Motorsports	Chevrolet	1:25.640	95.843
3	2	Jesse Love (R) (P)	Richard Childress Racing	Chevrolet	1:25.832	95.629
Full practice results

== Qualifying ==
Qualifying will be held on Saturday, October 12, at 11:00 AM EST. Since the Charlotte Motor Speedway roval layout is a road course, the qualifying system is a two group system, with two rounds. Drivers will be separated into two groups, Group A and Group B. Each driver will have multiple laps to set a time. The fastest 5 drivers from each group will advance to the final round. The fastest driver to set a time in the final round will win the pole.

Under a 2021 rule change, the timing line in road course qualifying is "not" the start-finish line. Instead, the timing line for qualifying will be set at the exit of Turn 13. Shane van Gisbergen, driving for Kaulig Racing, would win the pole after advancing from the preliminary round and setting the fastest time in Round 2, with a lap of 1:24.523, and a speed of 97.110 mph (156.283 km/h).

No drivers would fail to qualify.

=== Qualifying results ===
Pos.	#	Driver	Team	Make	Time (R1)	Speed (R1)	Time (R2)	Speed (R2)
1	97	Shane van Gisbergen (R) (P)	Kaulig Racing	Chevrolet	1:24.658	96.955	1:24.523	97.110
2	1	Sam Mayer (P)	JR Motorsports	Chevrolet	1:24.674	96.936	1:24.731	96.871
3	16	A. J. Allmendinger (P)	Kaulig Racing	Chevrolet	1:24.680	96.930	1:24.814	96.776
4	19	Josh Bilicki	Joe Gibbs Racing	Toyota	1:24.916	96.660	1:25.273	96.256
5	18	Sheldon Creed (P)	Joe Gibbs Racing	Toyota	1:25.172	96.370	1:25.280	96.248
6	21	Austin Hill (P)	Richard Childress Racing	Chevrolet	1:24.930	96.644	1:25.337	96.183
7	81	Chandler Smith (P)	Joe Gibbs Racing	Toyota	1:25.074	96.481	1:25.398	96.115
8	2	Jesse Love (R) (P)	Richard Childress Racing	Chevrolet	1:25.343	96.177	1:25.430	96.079
9	7	Justin Allgaier (P)	JR Motorsports	Chevrolet	1:25.622	95.863	1:25.722	95.751
10	88	Connor Mosack (i)	JR Motorsports	Chevrolet	1:25.481	96.021	1:25.825	95.636
Eliminated in Round 1
11	5	Anthony Alfredo	Our Motorsports	Chevrolet	1:25.378	96.137	—	—
12	98	Riley Herbst (P)	Stewart–Haas Racing	Ford	1:25.701	95.775	—	—
13	20	Aric Almirola (OP)	Joe Gibbs Racing	Toyota	1:25.708	95.767	—	—
14	00	Cole Custer (P)	Stewart–Haas Racing	Ford	1:25.779	95.688	—	—
15	9	Brandon Jones	JR Motorsports	Chevrolet	1:25.790	95.675	—	—
16	8	Sammy Smith (P)	JR Motorsports	Chevrolet	1:25.796	95.669	—	—
17	32	Austin Green	Jordan Anderson Racing	Chevrolet	1:25.892	95.562	—	—
18	26	Ed Jones	Sam Hunt Racing	Toyota	1:25.909	95.543	—	—
19	91	Alex Labbé	DGM Racing	Chevrolet	1:25.996	95.446	—	—
20	31	Parker Retzlaff	Jordan Anderson Racing	Chevrolet	1:26.051	95.385	—	—
21	51	Jeremy Clements	Jeremy Clements Racing	Chevrolet	1:26.096	95.335	—	—
22	48	Parker Kligerman (P)	Big Machine Racing	Chevrolet	1:26.111	95.319	—	—
23	11	Josh Williams	Kaulig Racing	Chevrolet	1:26.205	95.215	—	—
24	44	Brennan Poole	Alpha Prime Racing	Chevrolet	1:26.292	95.119	—	—
25	28	Ryan Sieg	RSS Racing	Ford	1:26.493	94.898	—	—
26	38	Matt DiBenedetto	RSS Racing	Ford	1:26.552	94.833	—	—
27	27	Jeb Burton	Jordan Anderson Racing	Chevrolet	1:26.603	94.777	—	—
28	07	Sage Karam	SS-Green Light Racing	Chevrolet	1:26.812	94.549	—	—
29	50	Preston Pardus	Pardus Racing	Chevrolet	1:26.952	94.397	—	—
30	43	Ryan Ellis	Alpha Prime Racing	Chevrolet	1:26.995	94.350	—	—
31	45	Brad Perez	Alpha Prime Racing	Chevrolet	1:27.081	94.257	—	—
32	35	Thomas Annunziata	Joey Gase Motorsports	Toyota	1:27.171	94.160	—	—
33	42	Leland Honeyman (R)	Young's Motorsports	Chevrolet	1:27.434	93.877	—	—
Qualified by owner's points
34	29	Blaine Perkins	RSS Racing	Ford	1:27.438	93.872	—	—
35	39	Kyle Sieg	RSS Racing	Ford	1:27.889	93.391	—	—
36	15	Dylan Lupton	AM Racing	Ford	1:28.059	93.210	—	—
37	92	Dawson Cram (i)	DGM Racing	Chevrolet	1:28.422	92.828	—	—
38	14	Nathan Byrd	SS-Green Light Racing	Chevrolet	1:30.006	91.194	—	—
Official qualifying results
Official starting lineup

== Late-race controversy ==
During the late stages of the race, NASCAR faced heavy criticism due to an incident that occurred with two laps to go. With two to go, an incident occurred after Leland Honeyman locked his brakes up and plowed into the tire barriers in turn three, becoming stuck. NASCAR continued on with the race, with Parker Kligerman (in a must-win situation) leading over Sam Mayer. NASCAR eventually brought out the caution as Kligerman crossed the start/finish line for the white flag. It was determined that the leader did not take the white flag before the caution came out; NASCAR would rule that the caution came out just a few feet before Kligerman crossed the line, resulting in an overtime restart. Mayer would eventually pass Kligerman on the final restart to win the race, earning his spot in the next round of the playoffs. Kligerman was officially scored in the sixth position, falling back numerous spots after a tire rub ended his chances at a win.

== Race results ==
Stage 1 Laps: 20

Pos.	#	Driver	Team	Make	Pts
1	16	A. J. Allmendinger (P)	Kaulig Racing	Chevrolet	10
2	97	Shane van Gisbergen (R) (P)	Kaulig Racing	Chevrolet	9
3	7	Justin Allgaier (P)	JR Motorsports	Chevrolet	8
4	21	Austin Hill (P)	Richard Childress Racing	Chevrolet	7
5	2	Jesse Love (R) (P)	Richard Childress Racing	Chevrolet	6
6	18	Sheldon Creed (P)	Joe Gibbs Racing	Toyota	5
7	88	Connor Mosack (i)	JR Motorsports	Chevrolet	0
8	98	Riley Herbst (P)	Stewart-Haas Racing	Ford	3
9	19	Josh Bilicki	Joe Gibbs Racing	Toyota	2
10	81	Chandler Smith (P)	Joe Gibbs Racing	Toyota	1

Stage 2 Laps: 20

Pos.	#	Driver	Team	Make	Pts
1	7	Justin Allgaier (P)	JR Motorsports	Chevrolet	10
2	88	Connor Mosack (i)	JR Motorsports	Chevrolet	0
3	1	Sam Mayer (P)	JR Motorsports	Chevrolet	8
4	20	Aric Almirola (OP)	Joe Gibbs Racing	Toyota	7
5	42	Leland Honeyman (R)	Young's Motorsports	Chevrolet	6
6	16	A. J. Allmendinger (P)	Kaulig Racing	Chevrolet	5
7	97	Shane van Gisbergen (R) (P)	Kaulig Racing	Chevrolet	4
8	81	Chandler Smith (P)	Joe Gibbs Racing	Toyota	3
9	07	Sage Karam	SS-Green Light Racing	Chevrolet	2
10	19	Josh Bilicki	Joe Gibbs Racing	Toyota	1

Stage 3 Laps: 32

Pos.	St	#	Driver	Team	Make	Laps	Led	Status	Pts
1	2	1	Sam Mayer (P)	JR Motorsports	Chevrolet	72	13	Running	48
2	3	16	A. J. Allmendinger (P)	Kaulig Racing	Chevrolet	72	18	Running	50
3	1	97	Shane van Gisbergen (R) (P)	Kaulig Racing	Chevrolet	72	7	Running	47
4	6	21	Austin Hill (P)	Richard Childress Racing	Chevrolet	72	0	Running	40
5	7	81	Chandler Smith (P)	Joe Gibbs Racing	Toyota	72	1	Running	36
6	22	48	Parker Kligerman (P)	Big Machine Racing	Chevrolet	72	12	Running	31
7	9	7	Justin Allgaier (P)	JR Motorsports	Chevrolet	72	6	Running	48
8	4	19	Josh Bilicki	Joe Gibbs Racing	Toyota	72	10	Running	32
9	13	20	Aric Almirola (OP)	Joe Gibbs Racing	Toyota	72	0	Running	35
10	16	8	Sammy Smith (P)	JR Motorsports	Chevrolet	72	0	Running	27
11	15	9	Brandon Jones	JR Motorsports	Chevrolet	72	0	Running	26
12	20	31	Parker Retzlaff	Jordan Anderson Racing	Chevrolet	72	0	Running	25
13	14	00	Cole Custer (P)	Stewart–Haas Racing	Ford	72	0	Running	24
14	19	91	Alex Labbé	DGM Racing	Chevrolet	72	0	Running	23
15	27	27	Jeb Burton	Jordan Anderson Racing	Chevrolet	72	0	Running	22
16	11	5	Anthony Alfredo	Our Motorsports	Chevrolet	72	0	Running	21
17	25	28	Ryan Sieg	RSS Racing	Ford	72	0	Running	20
18	10	88	Connor Mosack (i)	JR Motorsports	Chevrolet	72	5	Running	0
19	8	2	Jesse Love (R) (P)	Richard Childress Racing	Chevrolet	72	0	Running	24
20	21	51	Jeremy Clements	Jeremy Clements Racing	Chevrolet	72	0	Running	17
21	29	50	Preston Pardus	Pardus Racing	Chevrolet	72	0	Running	16
22	26	38	Matt DiBenedetto	RSS Racing	Ford	72	0	Running	15
23	35	39	Kyle Sieg	RSS Racing	Ford	72	0	Running	14
24	37	92	Dawson Cram (i)	DGM Racing	Chevrolet	72	0	Running	0
25	38	14	Nathan Byrd	SS-Green Light Racing	Chevrolet	72	0	Running	12
26	31	45	Brad Perez	Alpha Prime Racing	Chevrolet	72	0	Running	11
27	36	15	Dylan Lupton	AM Racing	Ford	71	0	Running	10
28	33	42	Leland Honeyman (R)	Young's Motorsports	Chevrolet	65	0	Accident	15
29	28	07	Sage Karam	SS-Green Light Racing	Chevrolet	63	0	Brakes	10
30	17	32	Austin Green	Jordan Anderson Racing	Chevrolet	58	0	Engine	7
31	30	43	Ryan Ellis	Alpha Prime Racing	Chevrolet	58	0	Running	6
32	12	98	Riley Herbst (P)	Stewart–Haas Racing	Ford	57	0	Driveshaft	8
33	34	29	Blaine Perkins	RSS Racing	Ford	56	0	Running	4
34	32	35	Thomas Annunziata	Joey Gase Motorsports	Toyota	52	0	Accident	3
35	5	18	Sheldon Creed (P)	Joe Gibbs Racing	Toyota	38	0	Accident	7
36	23	11	Josh Williams	Kaulig Racing	Chevrolet	32	0	Accident	1
37	18	26	Ed Jones	Sam Hunt Racing	Toyota	32	0	Accident	1
38	24	44	Brennan Poole	Alpha Prime Racing	Chevrolet	32	0	Accident	1
Official race results

== Standings after the race ==
Drivers' Championship standings

	Pos	Driver	Points
8	1	Justin Allgaier	3,035
	2	Cole Custer	3,028 (-7)
	3	Austin Hill	3,026 (–9)
3	4	Chandler Smith	3,025 (–10)
6	5	Sam Mayer	3,017 (–18)
1	6	Jesse Love	3,013 (–22)
1	7	A. J. Allmendinger	3,007 (–28)
1	8	Sammy Smith	3,006 (–29)
1	9	Shane van Gisbergen	2,102 (–933)
6	10	Sheldon Creed	2,097 (–938)
5	11	Riley Herbst	2,086 (–949)
	12	Parker Kligerman	2,080 (–955)
Official driver's standings

Manufacturers' Championship standings

Pos	Manufacturer	Points
1	Chevrolet	1,078
2	Toyota	1,031 (-47)
3	Ford	929 (–149)

- Note: Only the first 12 positions are included for the driver standings.

Previous race: 2024 United Rentals 250	NASCAR Xfinity Series; 2024 season	Next race: 2024 Ambetter Health 302
