= Sammy Smith =

American racing driver (born 2004)

- Smith at Las Vegas Motor Speedway in 2026
- Born: Samuel L. Smith; June 4, 2004 (age 22); Johnston, Iowa, U.S.
- Height: 6 ft 2 in (1.88 m)
- Weight: 185 lb (84 kg)
- Achievements: 2021, 2022 ARCA Menards Series East Champion; 2021 Florida Governor's Cup Winner; 2021 Winchester 400 Winner; 2022 Redbud 400 Winner
- Awards: 2021 ARCA Menards Series East Rookie of the Year; 2023 NASCAR Xfinity Series Rookie of the Year

NASCAR O'Reilly Auto Parts Series career
- 141 races run over 5 years
- 2026 position: 7th
- Best finish: 6th (2023)
- First race: 2022 Henry 180 (Road America)
- Last race: 2026 O'Reilly Auto Parts 300 (Homestead)
- First win: 2023 United Rentals 200 (Phoenix)
- Last win: 2026 TPG 250 (Talladega)
Wins	Top tens	Poles
4	68	3

NASCAR FedEx Freight Truck Series career
- 12 races run over 4 years
- Truck no., team: No. 15 (Tricon Garage)
- 2026 position: 96th
- Best finish: 83rd (2024)
- First race: 2023 NextEra Energy 250 (Daytona)
- Last race: 2026 Black's Tire 200 (Martinsville)
- First win: 2026 Love's RV Stop 225 (Talladega)
Wins	Top tens	Poles
1	7	0

ARCA Menards Series career
- 19 races run over 2 years
- Best finish: 4th (2022)
- First race: 2021 Shore Lunch 150 (Iowa)
- Last race: 2022 Shore Lunch 200 (Toledo)
- First win: 2022 Zinsser SmartCoat 200 (Berlin)
- Last win: 2022 Shore Lunch 200 (Toledo)
Wins	Top tens	Poles
6	17	8

ARCA Menards Series East career
- 15 races run over 2 years
- Best finish: 1st (2021, 2022)
- First race: 2021 Jeep Beach 175 (New Smyrna)
- Last race: 2022 Bush's Beans 200 (Bristol)
- First win: 2021 Pensacola 200 (Pensacola)
- Last win: 2022 Bush's Beans 200 (Bristol)
Wins	Top tens	Poles
8	14	4

ARCA Menards Series West career
- 4 races run over 3 years
- Best finish: 24th (2022)
- First race: 2021 Arizona Lottery 100 (Phoenix)
- Last race: 2023 General Tire 200 (Sonoma)
- First win: 2022 Desert Diamond Casino West Valley 100 (Phoenix)
Wins	Top tens	Poles
1	4	2
- Statistics up to date as of November 7, 2026.

Samuel L. Smith (born June 4, 2004) is an American professional stock car racing driver. He competes full-time in the NASCAR Truck Series, driving the No. 15 Toyota Tundra TRD Pro for Tricon Garage.

Smith has previously competed in the NASCAR O'Reilly Auto Parts Series and the ARCA Menards Series, and won two consecutive ARCA Menards Series East championships in 2021 and 2022. He has also competed in the CARS Tour, where he has driven for car owners Barry Nelson, Marcus Richmond, and Donnie Wilson, as well as Kyle Busch Motorsports.

== Racing career ==
=== Late model racing ===
Smith began racing at the age of eight in go-karts and then began racing legends cars and late models. His dad inspired him to start racing.

Smith made his debut in the CARS Tour in May 2019, driving the No. 12 Toyota for Barry Nelson. He was fourteen years old at the time. He would run five more races for Nelson that year and another in 2020, before running two races in the No. 19 for Marcus Richmond. Smith returned to Nelson's team in 2021 to compete in the race at Orange County Speedway. Smith competed full-time in the CARS Series in the Super Late Model Tour in 2020, driving the No. 51 (or on occasion, the No. 51S) for Kyle Busch Motorsports. That year, he also competed in the World Series of Asphalt.

In 2021, KBM decided to temporarily close down their late model team, so Smith moved to Wilson Motorsports for his late model starts that year. He again entered the World Series of Asphalt and won the race driving the team's No. 22 car.

=== ARCA ===
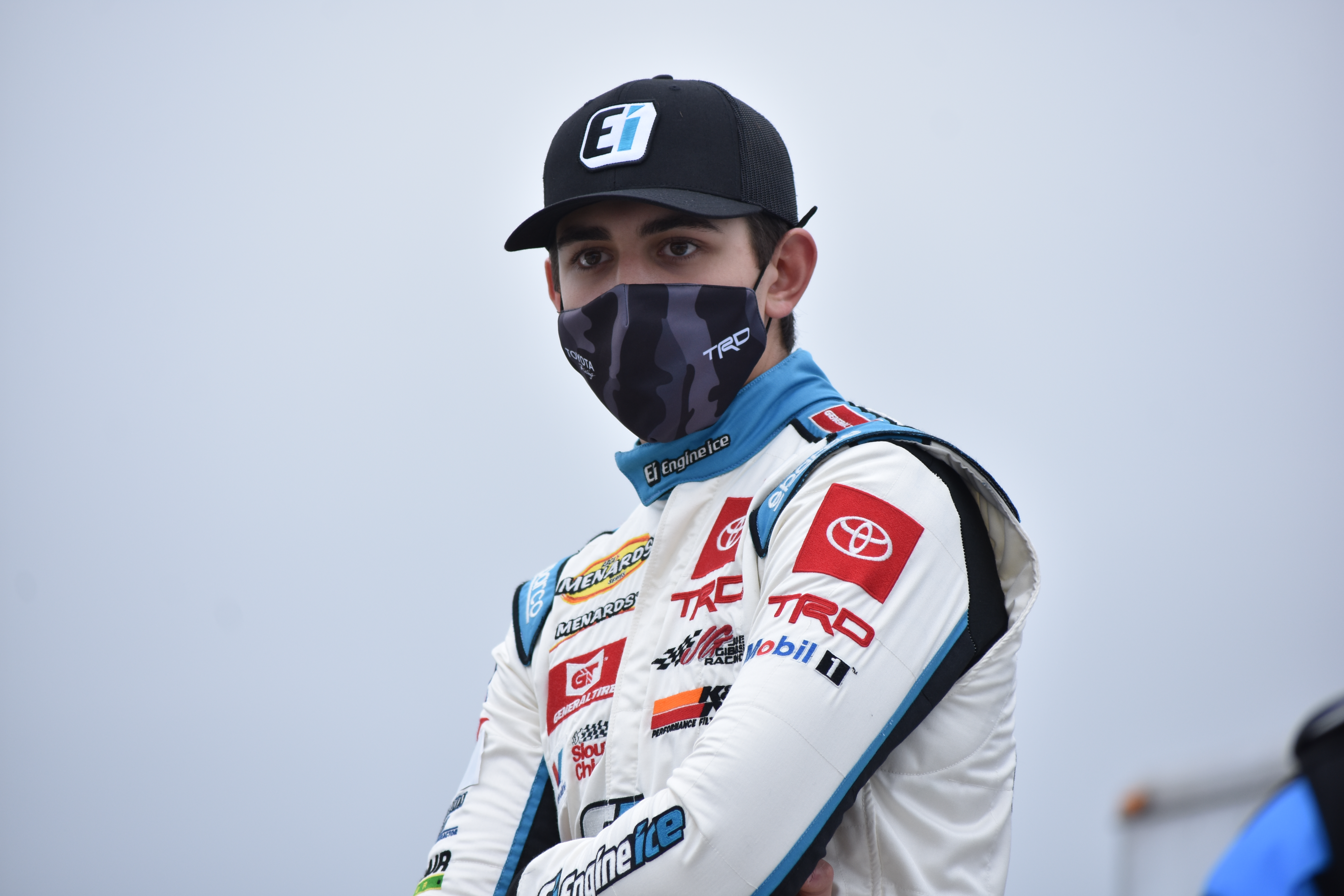
Smith at New Smyrna Speedway in 2021

On February 3, 2021, it was announced that Smith would compete in the first five races of the ARCA Menards Series East season as well as the West Series season finale at Phoenix, all in Joe Gibbs Racing's No. 18 car. In his debut at New Smyrna, Smith would lose the race to Max Gutiérrez in a three-wide photo finish with him and Taylor Gray. Smith would then go on to win and lead the most laps in the next two races at Five Flags and the Nashville Fairgrounds. He also won the pole at Five Flags. At Dover, JGR entered Ty Gibbs (their full-time driver in the main ARCA Menards Series) in the No. 18 and moved Smith to a new second car for the team, the No. 81. (It was originally the No. 18E on the entry list, but since this race was not a combination race, numbers with letters were not allowed and the team had to change the number.) Gibbs would win that race, and Smith would finish fourth. At Southern National Motorsports Park, Smith would pick up his third win of the season. While the remaining three East Series races were not on his initial schedule, Smith is expected to return to the No. 81 in those three races (at least Iowa) to hold onto the points lead and win the championship. Those three races are combination races with the main ARCA Menards Series, so Gibbs will be in the No. 18.

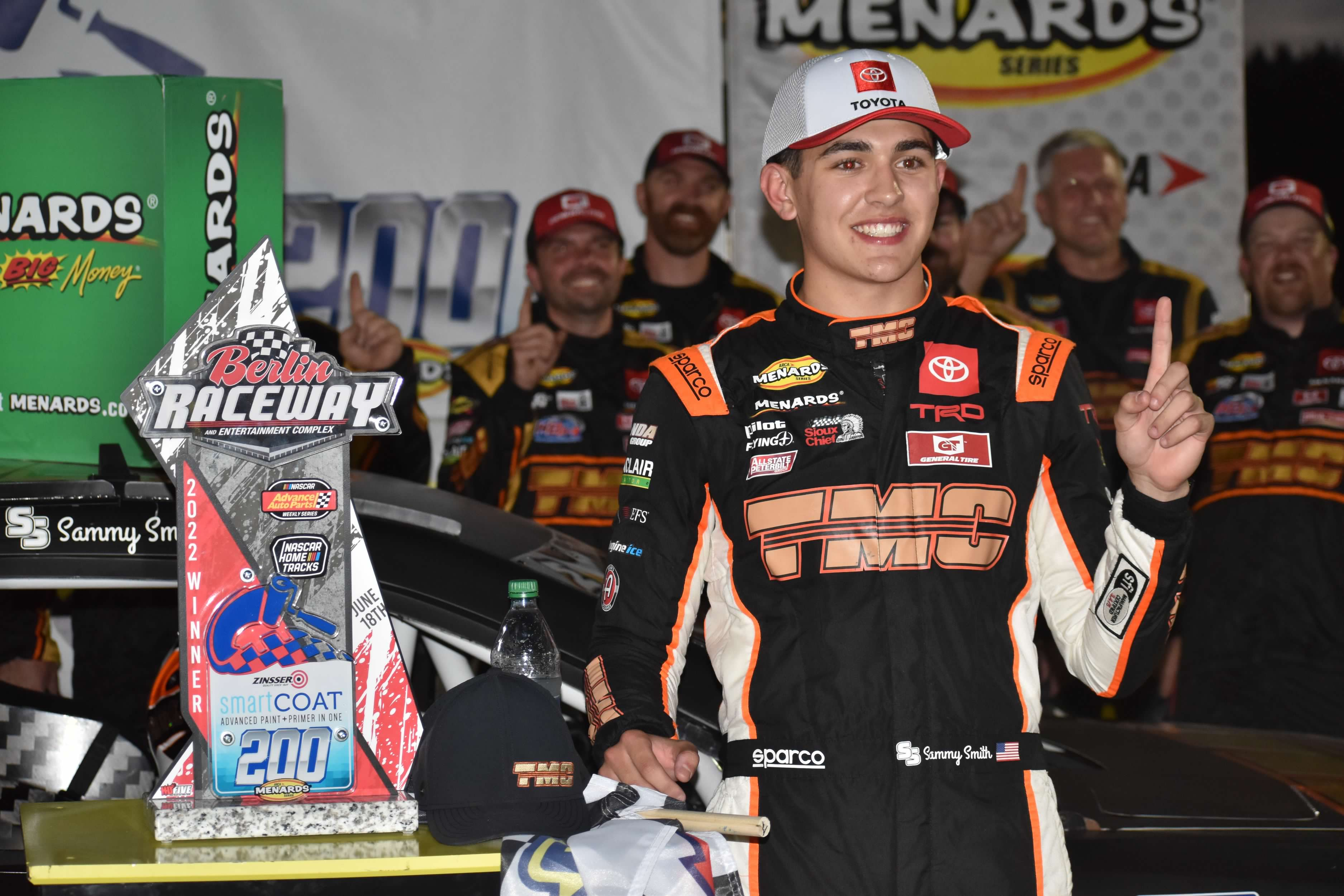
Smith celebrates his first ARCA win at Berlin Raceway in 2022

Smith returned to the East Series in 2022, this time driving for Kyle Busch Motorsports. He started the season on a high note, winning the season opener race at New Smyrna, after starting from the pole and leading 167 laps. He scored another win the in following race at Five Flags, leading 107 laps. His third win of the season came at Nashville, as he once again led the most laps, with 156. Smith would also run the main ARCA Menards Series schedule full-time, but because he will not turn eighteen until June 4, 2022, he would skip four races at the larger tracks, Daytona, Talladega, Kansas, and Charlotte. He earned his first main ARCA win at Berlin, leading the final eight laps after race leader, Daniel Dye, suffered a mechanical problem. He would get a second win in the following week at Elko, dominating the race and leading 233 laps.

=== O'Reilly Auto Parts Series ===
==== Joe Gibbs Racing: 2022–2023 ====
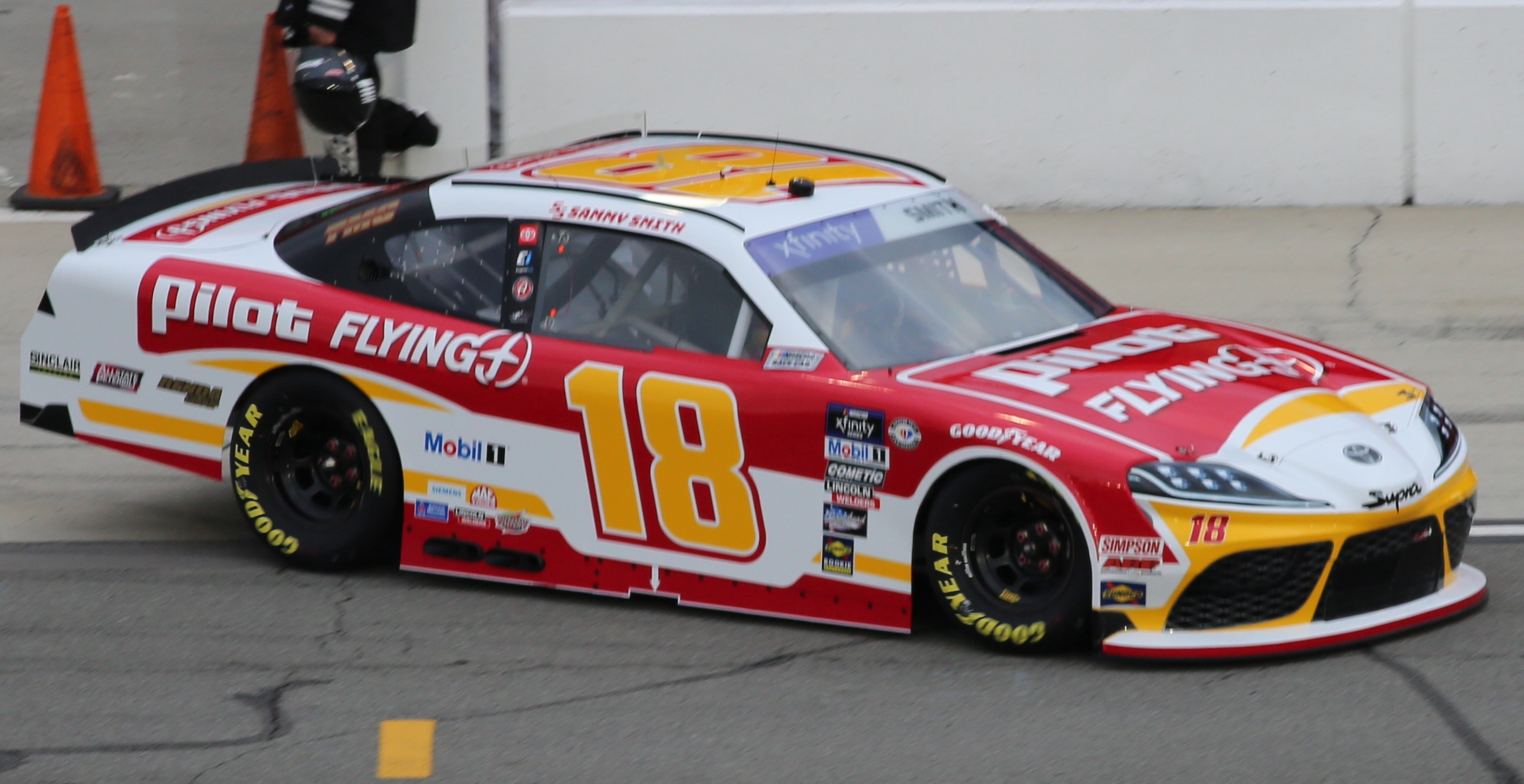
Smith's No. 18 car at Auto Club Speedway in 2023

On June 9, 2022, it was announced that Smith would drive for eight races in the NASCAR Xfinity Series for Joe Gibbs Racing, starting at Road America. On December 6, JGR announced that Smith would drive the No. 18 full-time in 2023 with sponsorship from Pilot Flying J.

During the 2023 season, Smith scored his first win at Phoenix; at the age of eighteen, he became the youngest Xfinity Series winner at Phoenix and the fourth-youngest winner in series history.

==== JR Motorsports: 2024–2026 ====
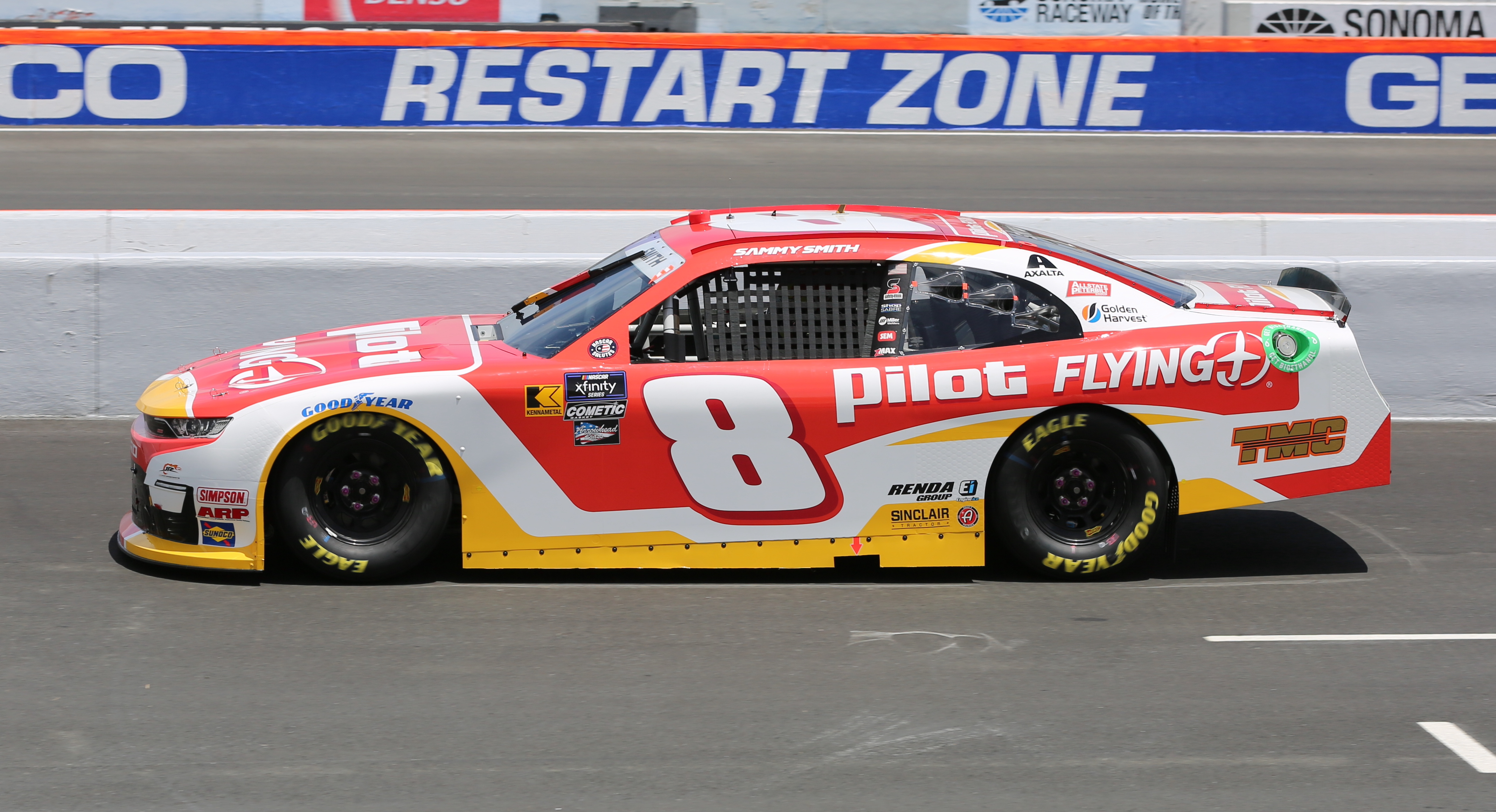
Smith's No. 8 car at Sonoma Raceway in 2024

On September 26, 2023, it was announced that Smith would leave JGR after the 2023 season and move to JR Motorsports in the No. 8 car for 2024. Smith started the season with a 23rd-place finish at Daytona. He made the playoffs as the 12th seed with no wins, four top-fives, and thirteen top-tens. During the playoffs, Smith scored his second career Xfinity win (first win of the 2024 season) at Talladega.

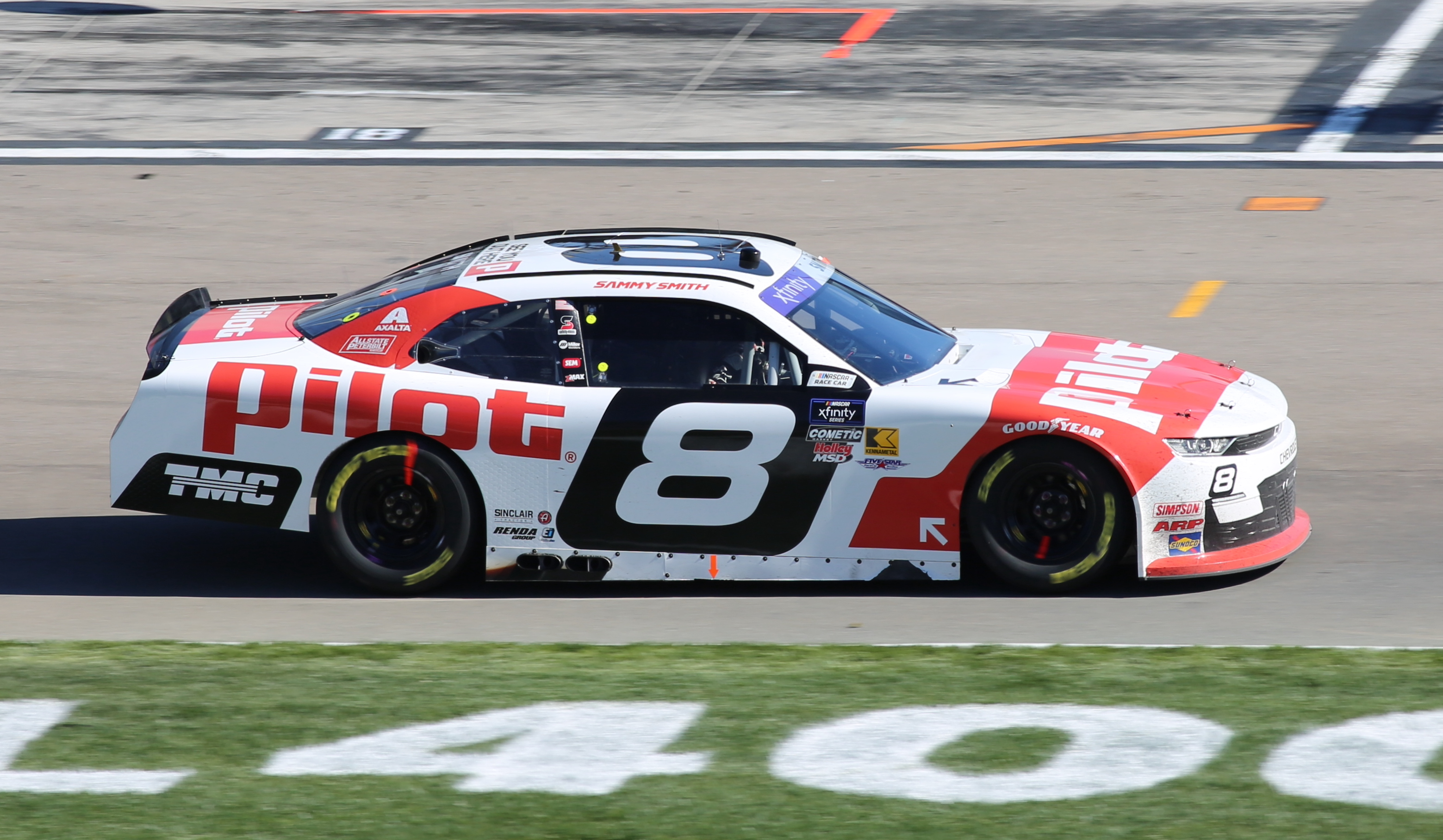
Smith's No. 8 car at Las Vegas Motor Speedway in 2025

Smith started the 2025 season with a 24th-place finish at Daytona. At Martinsville, he wrecked Taylor Gray while fighting for the lead on the final overtime lap, triggering a multi-car pileup. As a result, Smith was docked 50 driver points and fined US$25,000. At Rockingham, Smith finished second to Jesse Love, but Love was disqualified after failing post race inspection; as a result, Smith earned his first win of 2025.

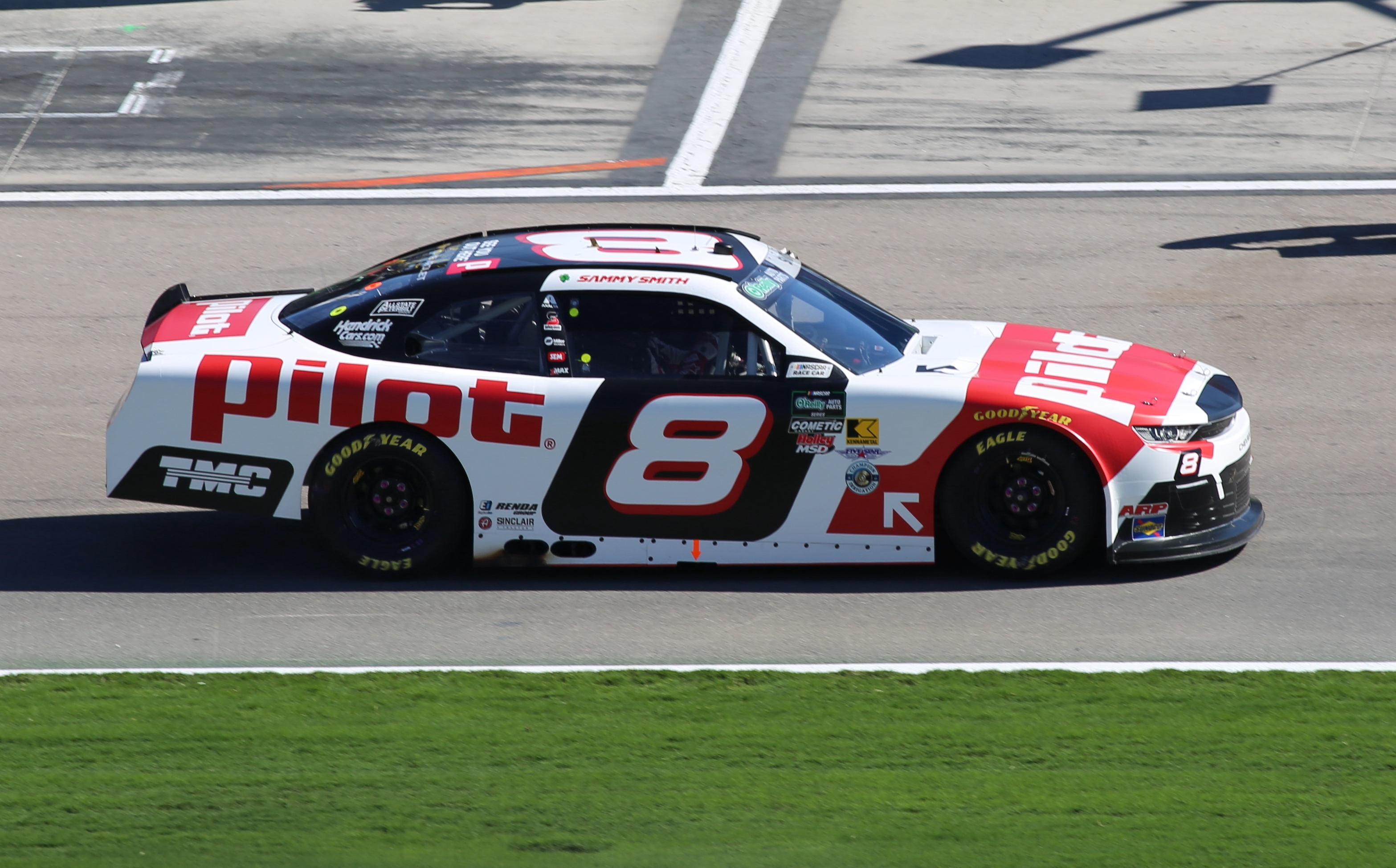
Smith's No. 8 car at Las Vegas Motor Speedway in 2026

Smith started the 2026 season with a fifth-place finish at Daytona. On August 26, it was announced that Smith would not return to JRM for 2027.

=== Craftsman Truck Series ===
On February 3, 2023, it was announced that Smith would make his Truck Series debut in the 2023 season-opener at Daytona, filling in for Taylor Gray in the Tricon Garage (previously David Gilliland Racing) No. 17 truck due to Gray still being seventeen years old and therefore not able to race there.

Spire Motorsports announced on March 27, 2024, that Smith was added to the No. 7 Chevrolet Silverado for a four-race schedule.

== Motorsports career results ==
(key) (Bold – Pole position awarded by qualifying time. Italics – Pole position earned by points standings or practice time. * – Most laps led.)

=== Racing career summary ===
Season	Series	Team	Races	Wins	Top 5	Top 10	Points	Position
2021	ARCA Menards Series	Joe Gibbs Racing	3	0	2	2	107	35th
2021	ARCA Menards Series East	Joe Gibbs Racing	8	3	7	7	385	**1st**
2021	ARCA Menards Series West	Joe Gibbs Racing	1	0	1	1	41	39th
2022	NASCAR Xfinity Series	Joe Gibbs Racing	9	0	1	3	230	30th
2022	ARCA Menards Series	Kyle Busch Motorsports	16	6	15	15	851	4th
2022	ARCA Menards Series East	Kyle Busch Motorsports	7	5	7	7	375	**1st**
2022	ARCA Menards Series West	Kyle Busch Motorsports	2	1	2	2	143	24th
2023	NASCAR Xfinity Series	Joe Gibbs Racing	33	1	6	15	2248	6th
2023	NASCAR Craftsman Truck Series	Tricon Garage	1	0	0	0	0	NC†
2023	ARCA Menards Series West	Hattori Racing Enterprises	1	0	1	1	42	38th
2024	NASCAR Xfinity Series	JR Motorsports	33	1	7	16	2185	11th
2024	NASCAR Craftsman Truck Series	Spire Motorsports	4	0	1	3	0	NC†
2025	Michelin Pilot Challenge – GS	Van der Steur Racing	1	0	0	0	140	63rd
2025	NASCAR Xfinity Series	JR Motorsports	33	1	8	18	2222	8th
2025	NASCAR Craftsman Truck Series	Spire Motorsports	4	0	1	3	0	NC†
2026	NASCAR O'Reilly Auto Parts Series	JR Motorsports	31	1	9	15	2293*	7th
2026	NASCAR Craftsman Truck Series	Spire Motorsports	2	1	1	1	0	NC†

^{†} As Smith was a guest driver, he was ineligible for championship points.

=== NASCAR ===
(key) (Bold – Pole position awarded by qualifying time. Italics – Pole position earned by points standings or practice time. * – Most laps led.)

==== O'Reilly Auto Parts Series ====
NASCAR O'Reilly Auto Parts Series results
Year	Team	No.	Make	1	2	3	4	5	6	7	8	9	10	11	12	13	14	15	16	17	18	19	20	21	22	23	24	25	26	27	28	29	30	31	32	33	NOAPSC	Pts	Ref
2022	Joe Gibbs Racing	18	Toyota	DAY	CAL	LVS	PHO	ATL	COA	RCH	MAR	TAL	DOV	DAR	TEX	CLT	PIR	NSH	ROA; 24	ATL	NHA	POC; 31	IRC	MCH; 12	GLN; 3	DAY; 38	DAR	KAN; 8	BRI; 14	TEX	TAL	ROV	LVS	HOM	MAR; 18	PHO; 10	30th	230	
2023	Joe Gibbs Racing	18	Toyota	DAY; 19	CAL; 19	LVS; 17	PHO; 1*	ATL; 17	COA; 4	RCH; 19	MAR; 2	TAL; 33	DOV; 6	DAR; 11	CLT; 10	PIR; 30	SON; 9	NSH; 34	CSC; 6	ATL; 10	NHA; 5	POC; 6	ROA; 31	MCH; 38	IRC; 28	GLN; 18	DAY; 21	DAR; 17	KAN; 35	BRI; 9	TEX; 3	ROV; 11	LVS; 17	HOM; 9	**MAR**; 3*	**PHO**; 9	6th	2248	
2024	JR Motorsports	8	Chevy	DAY; 23	ATL; 10	LVS; 8	PHO; 9	COA; 36	RCH; 9	MAR; 7	TEX; 8	TAL; 21	DOV; 33	DAR; 34	CLT; 3	PIR; 3	SON; 33	IOW; 4	NHA; 12	NSH; 30	CSC; 13	POC; 9	IND; 18	MCH; 5	DAY; 23	DAR; 5	ATL; 7	GLN; 19	BRI; 15	KAN; 22	TAL; 1	ROV; 10	LVS; 32	HOM; 22	MAR; 2	PHO; 15	11th	2185	
2025	JR Motorsports	8	Chevy	DAY; 24	ATL; 4	COA; 11	PHO; 14	**LVS**; 14	HOM; 21	MAR; 10	DAR; 9	BRI; 4	CAR; 1	TAL; 31	TEX; 18	CLT; 38	NSH; 10	MXC; 10	POC; 8	ATL; 33	CSC; 7	SON; 9	DOV; 24	IND; 7	IOW; 15	GLN; 3	DAY; 2	PIR; 22	GTW; 33	BRI; 37	KAN; 4	ROV; 3	LVS; 20	TAL; 9	MAR; 2	PHO; 6	8th	2222	
2026	JR Motorsports	8	Chevy	DAY; 5	ATL; 30	COA; 3	PHO; 6	LVS; 5	DAR; 9	MAR; 3	CAR; 12	BRI; 13	KAN; 16	TAL; 4	TEX; 13	GLN; 16	DOV; 9	CLT; 11	NSH; 10	POC; 19	COR; 5	SON; 11	CHI; 13	ATL; 18*	IND; 19	IOW; 17	DAY; 36	DAR; 4	GTW; 8	BRI; 10	LVS; 15	CLT; 16	PHO; 5	TAL; 1	MAR; 7	HOM; 15	7th	2352	

==== Truck Series ====
NASCAR Truck Series results
Year	Team	No.	Make	1	2	3	4	5	6	7	8	9	10	11	12	13	14	15	16	17	18	19	20	21	22	23	24	25	NTSC	Pts	Ref
2023	Tricon Garage	17	Toyota	DAY; 14	LVS	ATL	COA	TEX	BRD	MAR	KAN	DAR	NWS	CLT	GTW	NSH	MOH	POC	RCH	IRP	MLW	KAN	BRI	TAL	HOM	PHO			102nd	0^{1}	
2024	Spire Motorsports	7	Chevy	DAY	ATL	LVS	BRI	COA	MAR; 8	TEX	KAN	DAR	NWS; 5	CLT	GTW	NSH	POC	IRP; 6	RCH	MLW; 17	BRI	KAN	TAL	HOM	MAR	PHO			83rd	0^{1}	
2025	Spire Motorsports	7	Chevy	DAY	ATL	LVS	HOM	MAR	BRI	CAR; 16	TEX	KAN	NWS; 10	CLT	NSH	MCH	POC	LRP	IRP	GLN; 6	RCH; 4	DAR	BRI	NHA	ROV	TAL	MAR	PHO	84th	0^{1}	
2026	Spire Motorsports	7	Chevy	DAY	ATL	STP	DAR	CAR; 11	BRI	TEX	GLN	DOV	CLT	NSH	MCH	COR	LRP	NWS	IRP	RCH	NHA	BRI	KAN	CLT	PHO	TAL; 1*	MAR; 33	HOM	96th	0^{1}	
2027	Tricon Garage	15	Toyota	DAY	ATL	STP	DAR	BRI	TEX	KAN	NWS	CLT	NSS	POC	MCH	LRP	ATL	IRP	BRI	BGS	MSP	NHA	KAN	CLT	PHO	TAL	MAR	HOM			

^{*} Season still in progress
^{1} Ineligible for series points

=== ARCA Menards Series ===
ARCA Menards Series results
Year	Team	No.	Make	1	2	3	4	5	6	7	8	9	10	11	12	13	14	15	16	17	18	19	20	AMSC	Pts	Ref
2021	Joe Gibbs Racing	81	Toyota	DAY	PHO	TAL	KAN	TOL	CLT	MOH	POC	ELK	BLN	IOW; 18	WIN	GLN	MCH	ISF	MLW; 5	DSF	BRI; 2	SLM	KAN	35th	107	
2022	Kyle Busch Motorsports	18	Toyota	DAY	**PHO**; 3*	TAL	KAN	CLT	IOW; 2*	BLN; 1	**ELK**; 1*	MOH; 3	**POC**; 12	**IRP**; 2	MCH; 4	**GLN**; 5	ISF; 4	**MLW**; 1*	DSF; 3	KAN; 3	**BRI**; 1*	**SLM**; 1**	TOL; 1	4th	851	

==== ARCA Menards Series East ====
ARCA Menards Series East results
Year	Team	No.	Make	1	2	3	4	5	6	7	8	AMSEC	Pts	Ref
2021	Joe Gibbs Racing	18	Toyota	NSM; 2*	**FIF**; 1*	NSV; 1*		SNM; 1				1st	435	
2021	Joe Gibbs Racing	81	Toyota				DOV; 4		IOW; 18	MLW; 5	BRI; 2	1st	435	
2022	Kyle Busch Motorsports	18	Toyota	**NSM**; 1*	FIF; 1*	DOV; 5	NSV; 1*	IOW; 2	**MLW**; 1*	**BRI**; 1*		1st	426	

==== ARCA Menards Series West ====
ARCA Menards Series West results
Year	Team	No.	Make	1	2	3	4	5	6	7	8	9	10	11	12	AMSWC	Pts	Ref
2021	Joe Gibbs Racing	81	Toyota	PHO	SON	IRW	CNS	IRW	PIR	LVS	AAS	PHO; 3				39th	41	
2022	Kyle Busch Motorsports	18	Toyota	**PHO**; 3*	IRW	KCR	PIR	SON	IRW	EVG	PIR	AAS	LVS	**PHO**; 1*		24th	143	
2023	Hattori Racing Enterprises	81	Toyota	PHO	IRW	KCR	PIR	SON; 2	IRW	SHA	EVG	AAS	LVS	MAD	PHO	38th	42	

=== CARS Late Model Stock Car Tour ===
(key) (Bold – Pole position awarded by qualifying time. Italics – Pole position earned by points standings or practice time. * – Most laps led. ** – All laps led.)

CARS Late Model Stock Car Tour results
Year	Team	No.	Make	1	2	3	4	5	6	7	8	9	10	11	12	13	CLMSCTC	Pts	Ref
2019	Nelson Motorsports	12	Toyota	SNM	HCY	ROU	ACE; 9	MMS; 3	LGY; 3	DOM	CCS; 3	HCY; 5	ROU; 2	SBO			13th	173	
2020	Nelson Motorsports	12	Toyota	SNM	ACE; 5	HCY	HCY	DOM; 14	FCS	LGY							24th	61	
2020	R&S Race Cars	19	Toyota								CCS; 19	FLO	GRE				24th	61	
2021	Nelson Motorsports	2N	Chevy	DIL	HCY	OCS; 20	ACE	CRW	LGY	DOM	HCY	MMS	TCM	FLC	WKS	SBO	57th	13	

=== CARS Super Late Model Tour ===
(key)

CARS Super Late Model Tour results
Year	Team	No.	Make	1	2	3	4	5	6	7	8	CSLMTC	Pts	Ref
2020	Kyle Busch Motorsports	51S	Toyota	SNM; 12		JEN; 2			**BRI**; 7		NSH; 20	3rd	207	
2020	Kyle Busch Motorsports	51	Toyota		HCY; 7		HCY; 6	FCS; 2*		FLC; 3		3rd	207	
2021	Donnie Wilson	22	Toyota	HCY	GPS; 3	NSH; 5	JEN; 1	HCY	MMS	TCM; 20	SBO	7th	75	

=== ASA STARS National Tour ===
(key) (Bold – Pole position awarded by qualifying time. Italics – Pole position earned by points standings or practice time. * – Most laps led. ** – All laps led.)

ASA STARS National Tour results
Year	Team	No.	Make	1	2	3	4	5	6	7	8	9	10	ASNTC	Pts	Ref
2023	Wilson Motorsports	22	Toyota	FIF	MAD	NWS; 4	HCY	MLW	AND					44th	90	
2023	Wilson Motorsports	22S	Toyota							WIR; 21	TOL	WIN	NSV	44th	90	
