= 2024 Ambetter Health 302 =

30th race of the 2024 NASCAR Xfinity Series

Race details
- Race 30 of 33 in the 2024 NASCAR Xfinity Series
- Date: October 19, 2024
- Location: Las Vegas Motor Speedway in Las Vegas, Nevada
- Course: Permanent racing facility
- Course length: 1.5 miles (3.67 km)
- Distance: 201 laps, 302 mi (485 km)
- Scheduled distance: 201 laps, 301 mi (485 km)
- Average speed: 127.215 mph (204.733 km/h)

Pole position
Driver	Brandon Jones	JR Motorsports
- Time: 29.439

Most laps led
Driver	A. J. Allmendinger	Kaulig Racing
- Laps: 102

Winner
No. 16	A. J. Allmendinger	Kaulig Racing

Television in the United States
- Network: The CW (produced by NBC Sports)
- Announcers: Rick Allen, Jeff Burton, and Steve Letarte.

Radio in the United States
- Radio: PRN

The 2024 Ambetter Health 302 was the 30th stock car race of the 2024 NASCAR Xfinity Series, the fourth race of the Playoffs, the first race of the Round of 8, and the 7th iteration of the event. The race was held on October 19, 2024, at Las Vegas Motor Speedway in Las Vegas, Nevada, a 1.5 miles (2.4 km) permanent quad-oval shaped intermediate speedway. The race took the scheduled 201 laps to complete. A. J. Allmendinger, driving for Kaulig Racing, would hold off Ryan Sieg in a fierce battle for the win, and after the caution came out with six to go, he took advantage of the restart and cruised to victory for his 18th career NASCAR Xfinity Series win, and his first of the season. Allmendinger was also the class of the field, leading a race-high 102 laps. With his win, he would also clinch a spot in the Championship 4. To fill out the podium, Justin Allgaier, driving for JR Motorsports, would finish in 3rd, respectively.

== Report ==
=== Background ===
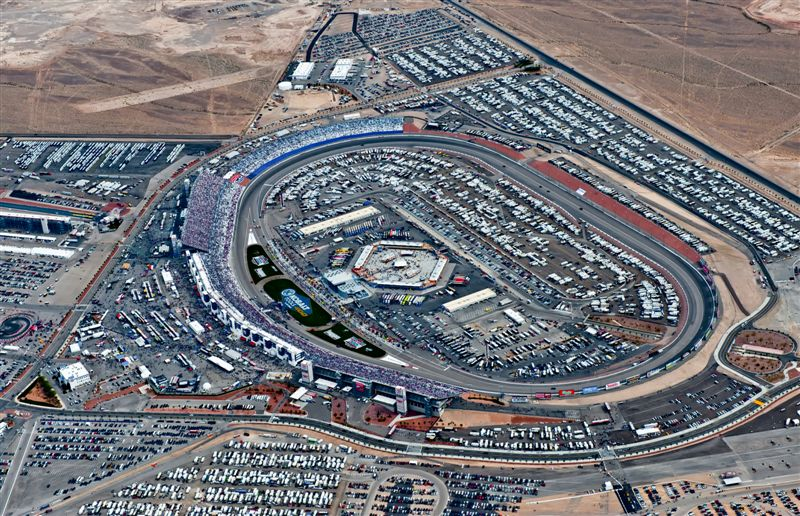
Las Vegas Motor Speedway, the track where the race was held.

Las Vegas Motor Speedway, located in Clark County, Nevada outside the Las Vegas city limits and about 15 miles northeast of the Las Vegas Strip, is a 1,200-acre (490 ha) complex of multiple tracks for motorsports racing. The complex is owned by Speedway Motorsports, Inc., which is headquartered in Charlotte, North Carolina.

==== Entry list ====
- (R) denotes rookie driver.
- (i) denotes driver who is ineligible for series driver points.
- (P) denotes playoff driver.
- (OP) denotes owner's playoff car.

#	Driver	Team	Make
00	Cole Custer (P)	Stewart–Haas Racing	Ford
1	Sam Mayer (P)	JR Motorsports	Chevrolet
2	Jesse Love (R) (P)	Richard Childress Racing	Chevrolet
5	Anthony Alfredo	Our Motorsports	Chevrolet
07	Myatt Snider	SS-Green Light Racing	Chevrolet
7	Justin Allgaier (P)	JR Motorsports	Chevrolet
8	Sammy Smith (P)	JR Motorsports	Chevrolet
9	Brandon Jones	JR Motorsports	Chevrolet
10	Daniel Dye (i)	Kaulig Racing	Chevrolet
11	Josh Williams	Kaulig Racing	Chevrolet
14	J. J. Yeley	SS-Green Light Racing	Ford
15	Dylan Lupton	AM Racing	Ford
16	A. J. Allmendinger (P)	Kaulig Racing	Chevrolet
18	Sheldon Creed	Joe Gibbs Racing	Toyota
19	Taylor Gray (i)	Joe Gibbs Racing	Toyota
20	Aric Almirola (OP)	Joe Gibbs Racing	Toyota
21	Austin Hill (P)	Richard Childress Racing	Chevrolet
26	Corey Heim (i)	Sam Hunt Racing	Toyota
27	Jeb Burton	Jordan Anderson Racing	Chevrolet
28	Ryan Sieg	RSS Racing	Ford
29	Blaine Perkins	RSS Racing	Ford
31	Parker Retzlaff	Jordan Anderson Racing	Chevrolet
35	Akinori Ogata (i)	Joey Gase Motorsports	Chevrolet
38	Matt DiBenedetto	RSS Racing	Ford
39	Kyle Sieg	RSS Racing	Ford
42	Leland Honeyman (R)	Young's Motorsports	Chevrolet
43	Ryan Ellis	Alpha Prime Racing	Chevrolet
44	Brennan Poole	Alpha Prime Racing	Chevrolet
45	Garrett Smithley	Alpha Prime Racing	Chevrolet
48	Parker Kligerman	Big Machine Racing	Chevrolet
51	Jeremy Clements	Jeremy Clements Racing	Chevrolet
53	Joey Gase	Joey Gase Motorsports	Chevrolet
74	Ryan Vargas	Mike Harmon Racing	Chevrolet
81	Chandler Smith (P)	Joe Gibbs Racing	Toyota
91	Kyle Weatherman	DGM Racing	Chevrolet
92	Dawson Cram (i)	DGM Racing	Chevrolet
97	Shane van Gisbergen (R)	Kaulig Racing	Chevrolet
98	Riley Herbst	Stewart–Haas Racing	Ford
Official entry list

== Practice ==
The first and only practice session was held on Friday, October 18, at 3:35 PM PST, and would last for 30 minutes. Brandon Jones, driving for JR Motorsports, would set the fastest time in the session, with a lap of 30.155, and a speed of 179.075 mph (288.193 km/h).

Pos.	#	Driver	Team	Make	Time	Speed
1	9	Brandon Jones	JR Motorsports	Chevrolet	30.155	179.075
2	19	Taylor Gray (i)	Joe Gibbs Racing	Toyota	30.366	177.830
3	8	Sammy Smith (P)	JR Motorsports	Chevrolet	30.404	177.608
Full practice results

== Qualifying ==
Qualifying was held on Friday, October 18, at 3:10 PM PST. Since Las Vegas Motor Speedway is an intermediate racetrack, the qualifying system used is a single-car, one-lap system with only one round. Drivers will be on track by themselves and will have one lap to post a qualifying time, and whoever sets the fastest time will win the pole.

Brandon Jones, driving for JR Motorsports, would score the pole for the race, with a lap of 29.439, and a speed of 183.430 mph (295.202 km/h).

No drivers would fail to qualify.

=== Qualifying results ===
Pos.	#	Driver	Team	Make	Time	Speed
1	9	Brandon Jones	JR Motorsports	Chevrolet	29.439	183.430
2	00	Cole Custer (P)	Stewart–Haas Racing	Ford	29.478	183.187
3	81	Chandler Smith (P)	Joe Gibbs Racing	Toyota	29.547	182.760
4	1	Sam Mayer (P)	JR Motorsports	Chevrolet	29.566	182.642
5	8	Sammy Smith (P)	JR Motorsports	Chevrolet	29.575	182.587
6	7	Justin Allgaier (P)	JR Motorsports	Chevrolet	29.616	182.334
7	98	Riley Herbst	Stewart–Haas Racing	Ford	29.627	182.266
8	2	Jesse Love (R) (P)	Richard Childress Racing	Chevrolet	29.635	182.217
9	16	A. J. Allmendinger (P)	Kaulig Racing	Chevrolet	29.724	181.671
10	28	Ryan Sieg	RSS Racing	Ford	29.741	181.568
11	48	Parker Kligerman	Big Machine Racing	Chevrolet	29.747	181.531
12	20	Aric Almirola (OP)	Joe Gibbs Racing	Toyota	29.810	181.147
13	19	Taylor Gray (i)	Joe Gibbs Racing	Toyota	29.859	180.850
14	26	Corey Heim (i)	Sam Hunt Racing	Toyota	29.875	180.753
15	27	Jeb Burton	Jordan Anderson Racing	Chevrolet	29.886	180.687
16	97	Shane van Gisbergen (R)	Kaulig Racing	Chevrolet	29.990	180.060
17	21	Austin Hill (P)	Richard Childress Racing	Chevrolet	30.058	179.653
18	5	Anthony Alfredo	Our Motorsports	Chevrolet	30.100	179.402
19	51	Jeremy Clements	Jeremy Clements Racing	Chevrolet	30.161	179.039
20	31	Parker Retzlaff	Jordan Anderson Racing	Chevrolet	30.167	179.004
21	15	Dylan Lupton	AM Racing	Ford	30.180	178.926
22	39	Kyle Sieg	RSS Racing	Ford	30.215	178.719
23	11	Josh Williams	Kaulig Racing	Chevrolet	30.283	178.318
24	38	Matt DiBenedetto	RSS Racing	Ford	30.310	178.159
25	42	Leland Honeyman (R)	Young's Motorsports	Chevrolet	30.371	177.801
26	92	Dawson Cram (i)	DGM Racing	Chevrolet	30.489	177.113
27	91	Kyle Weatherman	DGM Racing	Chevrolet	30.541	176.811
28	14	J. J. Yeley	SS-Green Light Racing	Ford	30.545	176.788
29	74	Ryan Vargas	Mike Harmon Racing	Chevrolet	30.817	175.228
30	10	Daniel Dye (i)	Kaulig Racing	Chevrolet	30.907	174.718
31	45	Garrett Smithley	Alpha Prime Racing	Chevrolet	30.955	174.447
32	44	Brennan Poole	Alpha Prime Racing	Chevrolet	30.980	174.306
33	07	Myatt Snider	SS-Green Light Racing	Chevrolet	31.184	173.166
Qualified by owner's points
34	43	Ryan Ellis	Alpha Prime Racing	Chevrolet	31.196	173.099
35	29	Blaine Perkins	RSS Racing	Ford	31.242	172.844
36	53	Joey Gase	Joey Gase Motorsports	Chevrolet	31.374	172.117
37	35	Akinori Ogata (i)	Joey Gase Motorsports	Chevrolet	32.030	168.592
38	18	Sheldon Creed	Joe Gibbs Racing	Toyota	–	–
Official qualifying results
Official starting lineup

== Race results ==
Stage 1 Laps: 45

Pos.	#	Driver	Team	Make	Pts
1	00	Cole Custer (P)	Stewart–Haas Racing	Ford	10
2	7	Justin Allgaier (P)	JR Motorsports	Chevrolet	9
3	98	Riley Herbst	Stewart–Haas Racing	Ford	8
4	16	A. J. Allmendinger (P)	Kaulig Racing	Chevrolet	7
5	18	Sheldon Creed	Joe Gibbs Racing	Toyota	6
6	28	Ryan Sieg	RSS Racing	Ford	5
7	2	Jesse Love (R) (P)	Richard Childress Racing	Chevrolet	4
8	21	Austin Hill (P)	Richard Childress Racing	Chevrolet	3
9	9	Brandon Jones	JR Motorsports	Chevrolet	2
10	1	Sam Mayer (P)	JR Motorsports	Chevrolet	1

Stage 2 Laps: 45

Pos.	#	Driver	Team	Make	Pts
1	7	Justin Allgaier (P)	JR Motorsports	Chevrolet	10
2	16	A. J. Allmendinger (P)	Kaulig Racing	Chevrolet	9
3	28	Ryan Sieg	RSS Racing	Ford	8
4	9	Brandon Jones	JR Motorsports	Chevrolet	7
5	81	Chandler Smith (P)	Joe Gibbs Racing	Toyota	6
6	00	Cole Custer (P)	Stewart–Haas Racing	Ford	5
7	20	Aric Almirola (OP)	Joe Gibbs Racing	Toyota	4
8	2	Jesse Love (R) (P)	Richard Childress Racing	Chevrolet	3
9	98	Riley Herbst	Stewart–Haas Racing	Ford	2
10	19	Taylor Gray (i)	Joe Gibbs Racing	Toyota	1

Stage 3 Laps: 111

Pos.	St.	#	Driver	Team	Make	Laps	Led	Status	Pts
1	9	16	A. J. Allmendinger (P)	Kaulig Racing	Chevrolet	201	102	Running	56
2	10	28	Ryan Sieg	RSS Racing	Ford	201	2	Running	48
3	6	7	Justin Allgaier (P)	JR Motorsports	Chevrolet	201	42	Running	53
4	3	81	Chandler Smith (P)	Joe Gibbs Racing	Toyota	201	0	Running	39
5	11	48	Parker Kligerman	Big Machine Racing	Chevrolet	201	0	Running	32
6	8	2	Jesse Love (R) (P)	Richard Childress Racing	Chevrolet	201	3	Running	38
7	7	98	Riley Herbst	Stewart–Haas Racing	Ford	201	4	Running	40
8	2	00	Cole Custer (P)	Stewart–Haas Racing	Ford	201	31	Running	44
9	38	18	Sheldon Creed	Joe Gibbs Racing	Toyota	201	0	Running	34
10	17	21	Austin Hill (P)	Richard Childress Racing	Chevrolet	201	0	Running	30
11	14	26	Corey Heim (i)	Sam Hunt Racing	Toyota	201	0	Running	0
12	30	10	Daniel Dye (i)	Kaulig Racing	Chevrolet	201	0	Running	0
13	12	20	Aric Almirola (OP)	Joe Gibbs Racing	Toyota	201	0	Running	28
14	4	1	Sam Mayer (P)	JR Motorsports	Chevrolet	201	0	Running	24
15	23	11	Josh Williams	Kaulig Racing	Chevrolet	201	0	Running	22
16	24	38	Matt DiBenedetto	RSS Racing	Ford	201	0	Running	21
17	1	9	Brandon Jones	JR Motorsports	Chevrolet	201	11	Running	29
18	19	51	Jeremy Clements	Jeremy Clements Racing	Chevrolet	201	0	Running	19
19	18	5	Anthony Alfredo	Our Motorsports	Chevrolet	201	0	Running	18
20	27	91	Kyle Weatherman	DGM Racing	Chevrolet	201	0	Running	17
21	32	44	Brennan Poole	Alpha Prime Racing	Chevrolet	201	0	Running	16
22	20	31	Parker Retzlaff	Jordan Anderson Racing	Chevrolet	201	0	Running	15
23	33	07	Myatt Snider	SS-Green Light Racing	Chevrolet	201	0	Running	14
24	15	27	Jeb Burton	Jordan Anderson Racing	Chevrolet	201	0	Running	13
25	28	14	J. J. Yeley	SS-Green Light Racing	Ford	199	0	Running	12
26	22	39	Kyle Sieg	RSS Racing	Ford	199	0	Running	11
27	21	15	Dylan Lupton	AM Racing	Ford	198	0	Running	10
28	34	43	Ryan Ellis	Alpha Prime Racing	Chevrolet	198	0	Running	9
29	31	45	Garrett Smithley	Alpha Prime Racing	Chevrolet	198	0	Running	8
30	36	53	Joey Gase	Joey Gase Motorsports	Chevrolet	198	0	Running	7
31	35	29	Blaine Perkins	RSS Racing	Ford	198	0	Running	6
32	5	8	Sammy Smith (P)	JR Motorsports	Chevrolet	197	5	Running	5
33	13	19	Taylor Gray (i)	Joe Gibbs Racing	Toyota	197	0	Running	0
34	29	74	Ryan Vargas	Mike Harmon Racing	Chevrolet	197	0	Running	3
35	37	35	Akinori Ogata (i)	Joey Gase Motorsports	Chevrolet	196	0	Running	0
36	26	92	Dawson Cram (i)	DGM Racing	Chevrolet	193	0	Running	0
37	25	42	Leland Honeyman (R)	Young's Motorsports	Chevrolet	130	0	Electrical	1
38	16	97	Shane van Gisbergen (R)	Kaulig Racing	Chevrolet	77	0	Fuel Pump	1
Official race results

== Standings after the race ==
Drivers' Championship standings

	Pos	Driver	Points
	1	Justin Allgaier	3,088
	2	Cole Custer	3,072 (-16)
1	3	Chandler Smith	3,064 (–24)
1	4	A. J. Allmendinger	3,063 (–25)
2	5	Austin Hill	3,056 (–32)
1	6	Jesse Love	3,051 (–37)
2	7	Sam Mayer	3,041 (–47)
	8	Sammy Smith	3,011 (–77)
1	9	Sheldon Creed	2,131 (–957)
1	10	Riley Herbst	2,126 (–962)
1	11	Parker Kligerman	2,112 (–976)
3	12	Shane van Gisbergen	2,103 (–957)
Official driver's standings

Manufacturers' Championship standings

Pos	Manufacturer	Points
1	Chevrolet	1,118
2	Toyota	1,064 (-54)
3	Ford	964 (–154)

- Note: Only the first 12 positions are included for the driver standings.

Previous race: 2024 Drive for the Cure 250	NASCAR Xfinity Series; 2024 season	Next race: 2024 Credit One NASCAR Amex Credit Card 300
