= Richard Childress Racing in the NASCAR O'Reilly Auto Parts Series =

American professional stock car racing team

RCR Enterprises, LLC, doing business as Richard Childress Racing (RCR), is an American professional stock car racing team that currently competes in the NASCAR Cup Series and the NASCAR O'Reilly Auto Parts Series. The team is based in Welcome, North Carolina, and is owned and operated by former driver Richard Childress. In the O'Reilly Auto Parts Series, the team currently fields four Chevrolet Camaros: the No. 2 full-time for Jesse Love, the No. 3 part-time for Austin Dillon, the No. 21 full-time for Austin Hill, and the No. 33 part-time for Garrett Mitchell. RCR has won the NASCAR O'Reilly Auto Parts Series championship six times.

== Cars ==
=== Car No. 2 history ===
Kevin Harvick (1999–2001)

RCR has fielded this entry in the Nationwide Series since the fall North Carolina Speedway race in 1999, moving the entire team from the Craftsman Truck Series. Kevin Harvick was the first driver of the No. 2 AC Delco-sponsored Chevy, winning three races and winning Rookie of the Year along with a third-place points finish, despite missing the spring race at North Carolina Speedway. He went on to win the championship in the Busch Series in 2001 while running full-time in Winston Cup as well.

Johnny Sauter (2002) and Ron Hornaday Jr. (2003–2004)

In 2002, rookie driver Johnny Sauter won at Chicagoland and finished 14th in points. The next year, Ron Hornaday Jr. drove the car full-time, winning one race and posting a third-place finish in points. He followed up that performance with another win and a drop to fourth in points the following year. Hornaday was not re-signed for 2005.

Clint Bowyer (2005–2008)

In 2005, Clint Bowyer took the wheel, in a program headed up by veteran crew chief Gil Martin, winning at Nashville Speedway and Memphis Motorsports Park to finish second in points. Bowyer was back in the No. 2 car in 2006 with crew chief Dan Deeringhoff, while Martin moved up to run the No. 07 Jack Daniels-sponsored Cup car for Bowyer's rookie season. Bowyer would finish 3rd in points with a win a Dover. 2006 was the final year for longtime sponsor AC Delco (sister company GM Goodwrench also withdrew from the Cup Series after 2006); for 2007, BB&T signed on as the sponsor, with Bowyer running 21 races in the No. 2. Kenny Wallace drove for the team in a one-race deal at Gateway International Raceway, with a sponsorship from sandwich chain Jimmy John's. In 2008, Bowyer returned full-time, scoring eighteen top-tens in the first 21 races including a win at Bristol. Bowyer would go on to win the 2008 Nationwide Series title.

Development drivers (2009)

In 2009, the No. 2 team ran a partial schedule with Sean Caisse and Austin Dillon sharing the ride. The team shut down after 2009.

Elliott Sadler (2012)

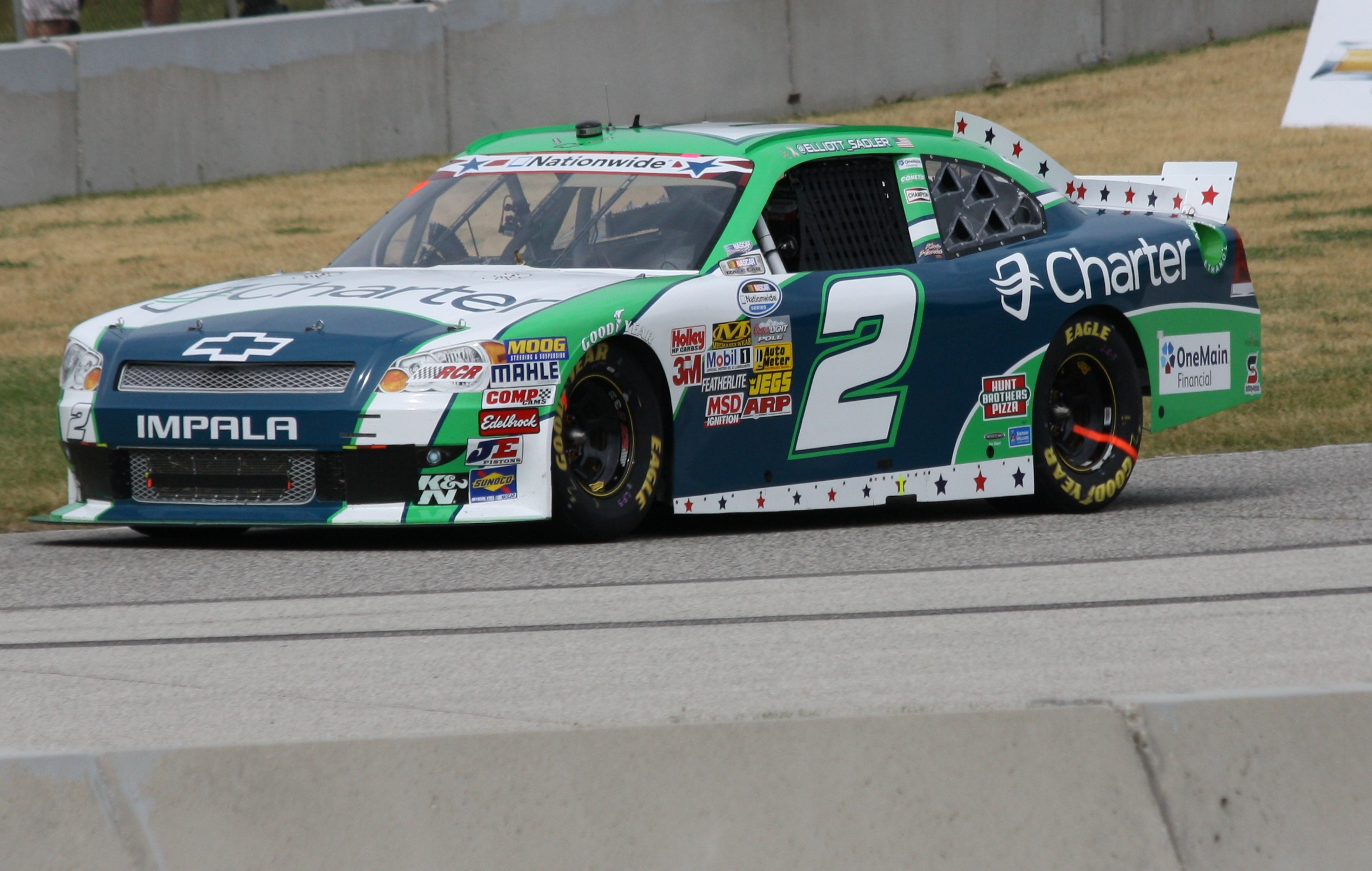
Elliott Sadler moved over from KHI in 2012, winning four races.

In late 2011, Kevin Harvick sold off his KHI organization, with the Nationwide Series team and equipment going to Childress' stable. KHI's 2 car, driver Elliott Sadler, and sponsor OneMain Financial moved over to RCR. Sadler continued on the success from KHI, finishing second in the 2012 drivers championship for the second year in a row to Ricky Stenhouse Jr. Even though Sadler scored four wins, it was announced in September that he turned down an extension offered by Childress to continue in the second tier series; he and sponsor OneMain Financial moved to Joe Gibbs Racing in 2013, which included a start in the Cup Series.

Brian Scott (2013–2015)

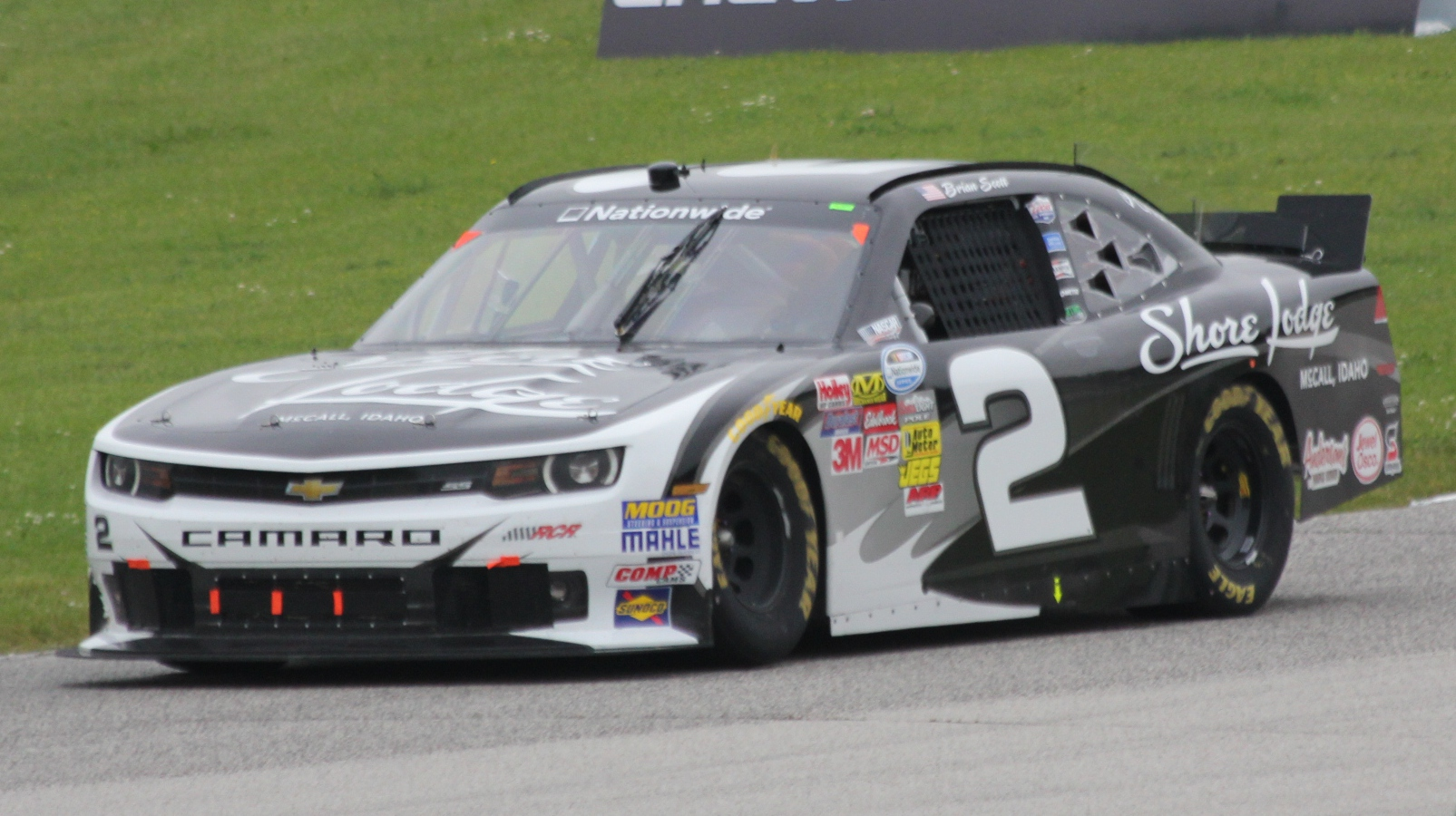
Brian Scott at Road America in 2014.

For 2013, former JGR driver Brian Scott took the wheel of the No. 2 under a multi-year contract (essentially swapping rides with Sadler). He brought sponsorship from the Idaho-based Shore Lodge and Whitetail Club, owned by his father. The No. 2 team also switched back to RCR-style angled number logos from KHI-style logos. Scott had markedly improved consistency from his crash-marred seasons with Gibbs, with three top-fives and thirteen top-tens en route to a seventh-place points finish. Scott's best run by far was at Richmond in September, where he led won the pole and led 229 laps. before being passed on the restart by Brad Keselowski with 11 laps to go, finishing second. Scott's team protested the restart-in-question, and after the race stated "We deserved to win that race."

In the spring Richmond race, Scott and Nelson Piquet Jr. got into altercations on the cool-down lap and on pit road following several on-track incidents that carried over from prior races. During the physical altercation, which got both teams' crew members involved, Piquet was shown kicking Scott in the groin, which Scott called "just a chicken move." Scott finished twentieth in the race.

Scott returned RCR in 2014, which included several starts in the No. 33 Cup car. Scott's performance continued to improve, winning another Richmond pole (in the Spring race), poles at both Chicagoland races, and was in contention to win several races. Scott ended the year with career bests in top-five finishes (six), top-tens (23), and average start and finish (6.5 and 9.5 respectively). He would come away with a career-best fourth place in the championship standings, losing a numerical tiebreaker for third with former RCR driver Elliott Sadler.

For 2015, Scott returned to the No. 2 Camaro, with Mike Hillman Jr. replacing Phil Gould as crew chief. Scott left the team for Richard Petty Motorsports in Cup Series at the end of the season.

Multiple drivers (2016–2017)

In 2016, the No. 2 began fielding variety of drivers driving including Austin Dillon and Paul Menard, with sponsorship from Rheem and Menards. Dillon and Menard would run 27 races combined, with the former winning at Auto Club and the fall Bristol race. Sam Hornish Jr., Ben Kennedy, Michael McDowell, and Regan Smith would also round out the No. 2 lineup. Hornish would win the spring Iowa race, while McDowell would take his first NASCAR victory at Road America. The 2 team would finish sixth in owners points.

For 2017, Dillon and Menard continued to run the No. 2 Camaro. Neither Dillon nor Menard won a race that year, with the No. 2 car having a best finish of second in the Lilly Diabetes 250 with Menard behind the wheel.

Matt Tifft (2018)

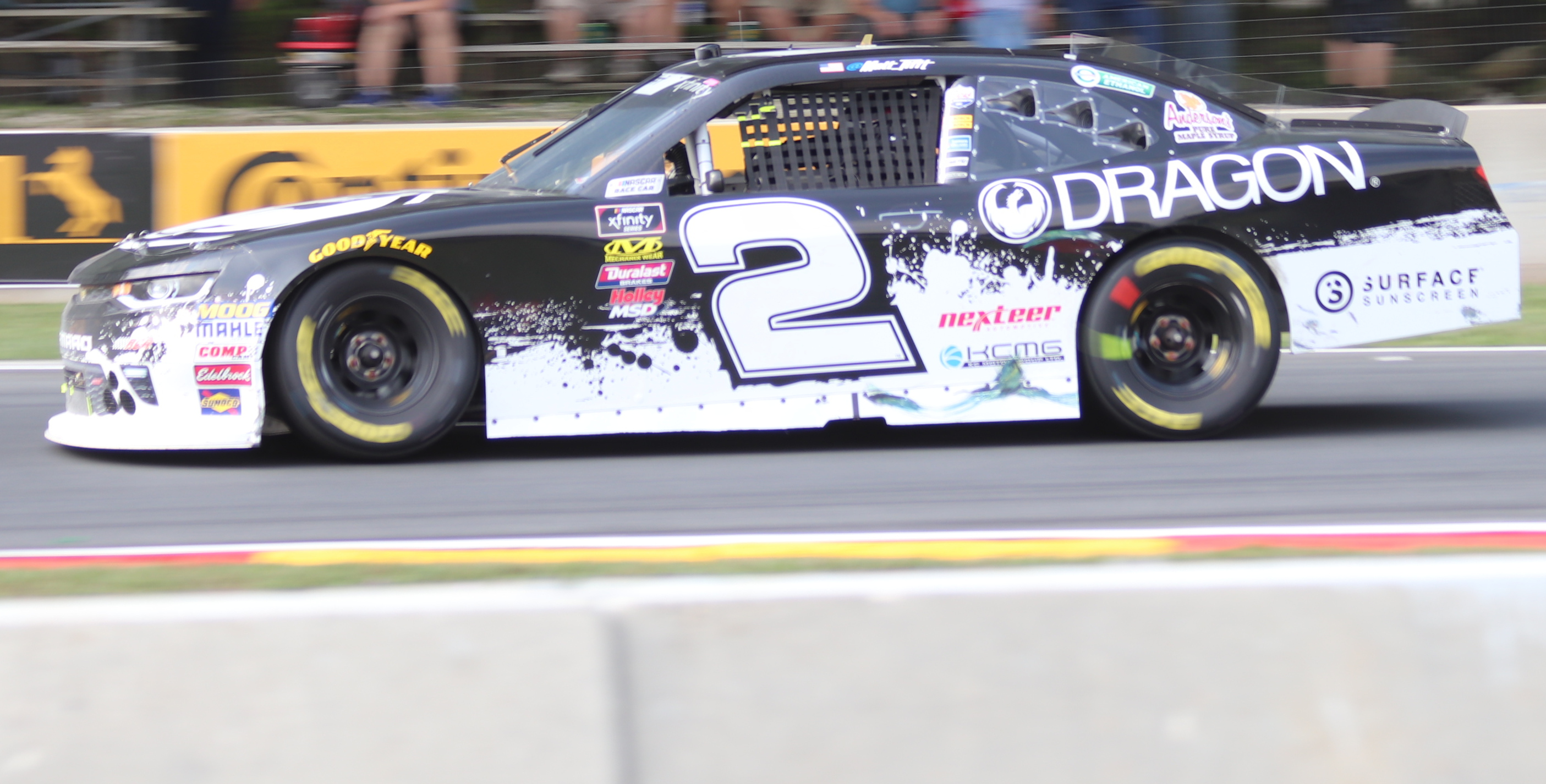
Matt Tifft at Road America in 2018

On October 5, 2017, it was announced that Matt Tifft will be the driver of the No. 2 car in 2018 and compete for the NASCAR Xfinity Series Championship.

Tyler Reddick (2019)

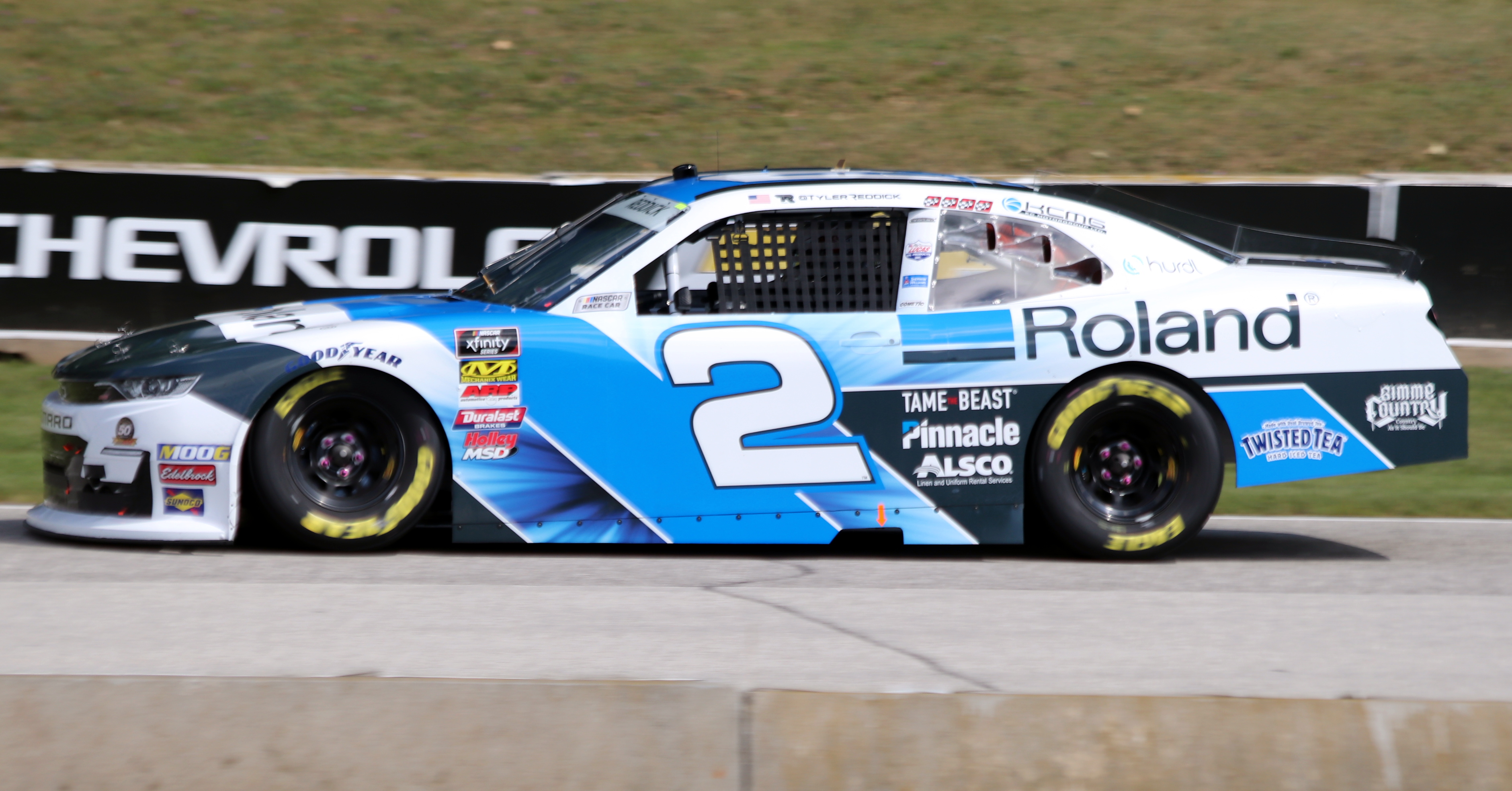
Reddick in 2019

Defending Xfinity Series champion, Tyler Reddick was signed to the team for 2019. He ended up winning his second championship and was the first championship that was won back-to-back while driving for different teams (2018 was in JR Motorsports).

Myatt Snider (2021)

On December 10, 2020, it was announced that Myatt Snider will drive the No. 2 car full-time. Snider picked up his first career win in the Contender Boats 250.

Sheldon Creed (2022–2023)

On September 14, 2021, it was announced that Sheldon Creed will drive the No. 2 car full-time in 2022 replacing Snider. On April 12, 2022, crew chief Jeff Stankiewicz was suspended for four races after the car lost a ballast during the 2022 Call 811 Before You Dig 250 at Martinsville Speedway. At the September Darlington race, Creed scored a career-best second place after engaging in a three-car battle with race winner Noah Gragson and Kyle Larson on the closing laps.

Creed started the 2023 season with a 34th place DNF at Daytona. Despite not winning a race, he stayed consistent enough to make the playoffs. On September 12, crew chief Jeff Stankiewicz was suspended for the Bristol playoff race and fined US$10,000 after the car was found to have two loose lug nuts following the Kansas race. On October 11, Creed announced he will not return to RCR in 2024.

Jesse Love (2024–2026)

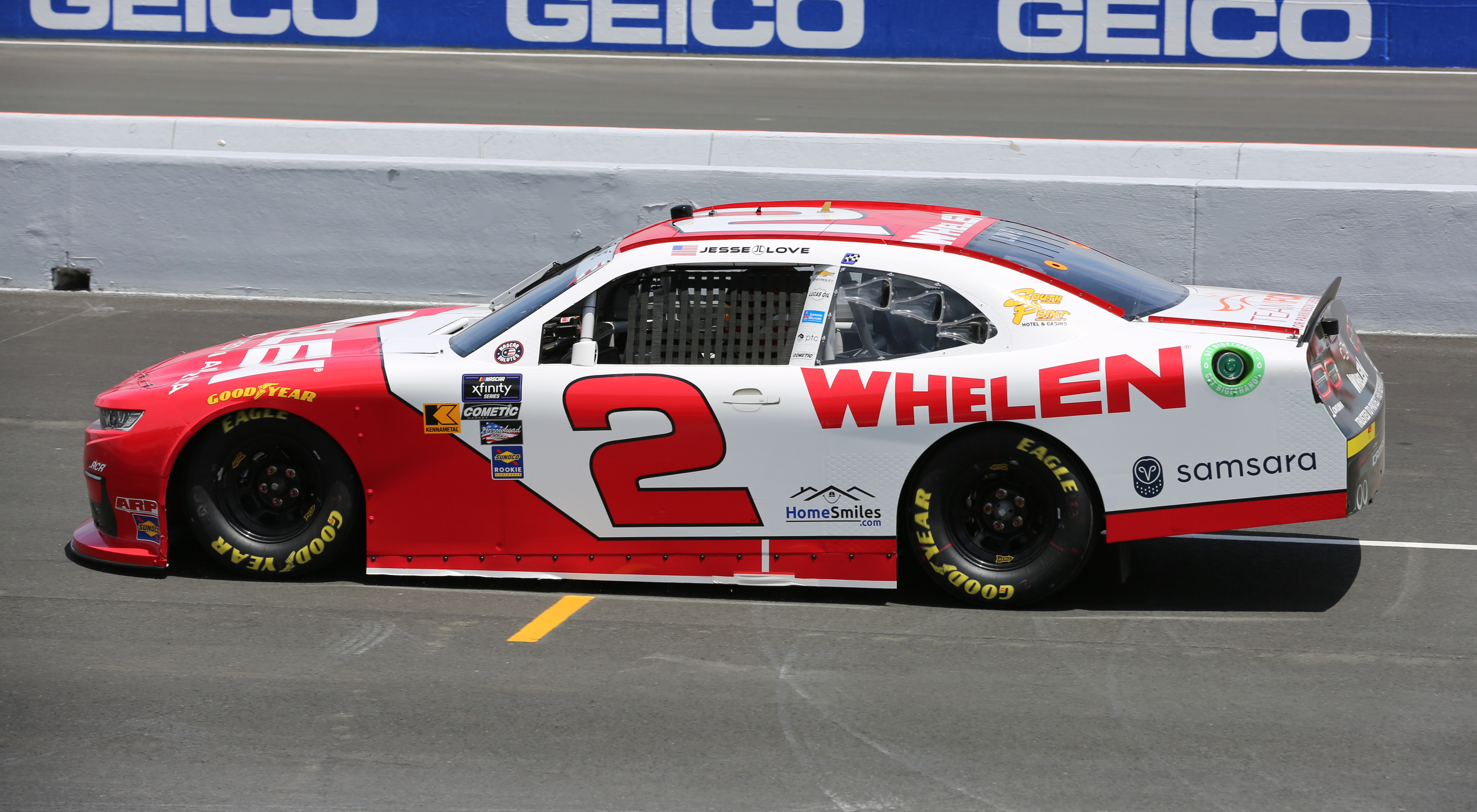
Jesse Love at Sonoma Raceway in 2024

On October 25, 2023, it was revealed that Jesse Love would drive the No. 2 car full-time in 2024, replacing Creed. Love started the season with a 20th place finish at Daytona. On April 20, he scored his first career win at Talladega.

Love started the 2025 season with a win at Daytona. Two months later, he won at Rockingham, but was disqualified after failing post race inspection; as a result, Sammy Smith was declared the winner. Love stayed consistent throughout the playoffs until he won at Phoenix to claim the Xfinity Series championship.

Love started the 2026 season with a 9th place finish at Daytona. Love led late at Phoenix, but was passed by eventual winner Justin Allgaier with ten laps to go. Following the race at Atlanta, Love earned a spot in "The Chase". He earned his first win of the season in "The Chase" at Gateway. He scored his second win of the season at fall Phoenix race from the pole position.

Carson Brown (2027)

On August 26, 2026, it was announced that Carson Brown would drive the No. 2 car full-time in 2027, replacing Love.

==== Car No. 2 results ====
Year	Driver	No.	Make	1	2	3	4	5	6	7	8	9	10	11	12	13	14	15	16	17	18	19	20	21	22	23	24	25	26	27	28	29	30	31	32	33	34	35	Owners	Pts
1999	Kevin Harvick	2	Chevy	DAY	CAR	LVS	ATL	DAR	TEX	NSV	BRI	TAL	CAL	NHA	RCH	NZH	CLT	DOV	SBO	GLN	MLW	MYB	PPR	GTY	IRP	MCH	BRI	DAR; DNQ	RCH	DOV	CLT	CAR; 42	MEM	PHO	HOM				134th	37
2000	Kevin Harvick	2	Chevy	DAY; 5	CAR; DNQ	LVS; 13	ATL; 34	DAR; 15	BRI; 26	TEX; 9*	NSV; 4	TAL; 16	CAL; 14	RCH; 3	NHA; 18	CLT; 8	DOV; 6*	SBO; 8	MYB; 2	GLN; 3	MLW; 11	NZH; 17	PPR; 11	GTY; 1*	IRP; 8	MCH; 9	BRI; 1*	DAR; 10	RCH; 20	DOV; 22	CLT; 24	CAR; 10	MEM; 1	PHO; 27	HOM; 22				3rd	4113
2001	Kevin Harvick	2	Chevy	DAY; 2	CAR; 2	LVS; 12	ATL; 8	DAR; 8	BRI; 7*	TEX; 1*	NSH; 7	TAL; 40	CAL; 5	RCH; 5	NHA; 2*	NZH; 2*	CLT; 26	DOV; 3*	KEN; 1*	MLW; 4*	GLN; 3	CHI; 27	GTY; 1*	PPR; 3	IRP; 1	MCH; 2	BRI; 1*	DAR; 14	RCH; 27	DOV; 14	KAN; 38	CLT; 4	MEM; 3	PHO; 3	CAR; 5	HOM; 37*			1st	4813
2002	Johnny Sauter	2	Chevy	DAY; 17	CAR; 13	LVS; 3	DAR; 11	BRI; 35	TEX; 15	NSH; 23	TAL; 33	CAL; 39	RCH; 22	NHA; 21	NZH; 11		DOV; 40	NSH; 19	KEN; 24	MLW; 12	DAY; 6	CHI; 1	GTY; 11	PPR; 34	IRP; 4	MCH; 22	BRI; 33	DAR; 25	RCH; 36	DOV; 16	KAN; 15	CLT; 37	MEM; 14	ATL; 10	CAR; 20	PHO; 7	HOM; 19		16th	3681
2002	Jay Sauter	2	Chevy													CLT; 9																							16th	3681
2003	Ron Hornaday Jr.	2	Chevy	DAY; 16	CAR; 12	LVS; 9	DAR; 9	BRI; 12	TEX; 17	TAL; 4	NSH; 16	CAL; 10	RCH; 15	GTY; 28	NZH; 1*	CLT; 21	DOV; 10	NSH; 16	KEN; 3	MLW; 4	DAY; 4	CHI; 12	NHA; 8	PPR; 7*	IRP; 8	MCH; 28	BRI; 2	DAR; 11	RCH; 7	DOV; 6	KAN; 14	CLT; 12	MEM; 4	ATL; 13	PHO; 5	CAR; 17	HOM; 15		4th	4591
2004	Ron Hornaday Jr.	2	Chevy	DAY; 7	CAR; 10	LVS; 26	DAR; 23	BRI; 9	TEX; 17	NSH; 31	TAL; 3	CAL; 11	GTY; 2	RCH; 12	NZH; 11	CLT; 7	DOV; 29	NSH; 5	KEN; 4	MLW; 1	DAY; 9	CHI; 10	NHA; 6*	PPR; 11	IRP; 35	MCH; 18	BRI; 20	CAL; 29	RCH; 21	DOV; 7	KAN; 5	CLT; 15	MEM; 3	ATL; 14	PHO; 28	DAR; 27	HOM; 7		6th	4258
2005	Clint Bowyer	2	Chevy	DAY; 12	CAL; 4	MXC; 7	LVS; 9	ATL; 21	NSH; 5	BRI; 13	TEX; 6	PHO; 13	TAL; 19	DAR; 10	RCH; 9	CLT; 32	DOV; 19	NSH; 1	KEN; 3	MLW; 10	DAY; 5	CHI; 6	NHA; 16	PPR; 2	GTY; 8	IRP; 2	GLN; 15	MCH; 30	BRI; 4	CAL; 3	RCH; 11	DOV; 2	KAN; 16	CLT; 33	MEM; 1*	TEX; 7	PHO; 2	HOM; 8	2nd	4869
2006	Clint Bowyer	2	Chevy	DAY; 3	CAL; 16	MXC; 16	LVS; 9	ATL; 14	BRI; 12	TEX; 18	NSH; 2	PHO; 21	TAL; 5	RCH; 7	DAR; 17	CLT; 36	DOV; 4	NSH; 2	KEN; 12	MLW; 18	DAY; 6	CHI; 7	NHA; 5	MAR; 2	GTY; 2	IRP; 40	GLN; 17	MCH; 12	BRI; 23	CAL; 13	RCH; 37	DOV; 1	KAN; 5	CLT; 7	MEM; 2	TEX; 17	PHO; 4	HOM; 11	3rd	4683
2007	Clint Bowyer	2	Chevy	DAY; 4	CAL	MXC	LVS; 41	ATL; 6	BRI; 5	NSH	TEX	PHO; 1*	TAL; 13	RCH; 1	DAR; 5	CLT; 3	DOV	NSH; 2	KEN	MLW	NHA; 6	DAY; 5	CHI; 4					MCH; 10	BRI; 8	CAL	RCH; 33	DOV	KAN; 4	CLT; 8	MEM	TEX; 4	PHO; 3	HOM; 9	28th	3157
2007	Kenny Wallace	2	Chevy																					GTY; 34	IRP	CGV	GLN												28th	3157
2008	Clint Bowyer	2	Chevy	DAY; 25	CAL; 9	LVS; 3	ATL; 19	BRI; 1*	NSH; 2	TEX; 3	PHO; 8	MXC; 6	TAL; 25	RCH; 9	DAR; 2	CLT; 6	DOV; 9	NSH; 4	KEN; 9	MLW; 3	NHA; 9	DAY; 4	CHI; 7	GTY; 8	IRP; 18	CGV; 9	GLN; 23	MCH; 10	BRI; 2	CAL; 7	RCH; 3	DOV; 10	KAN; 2	CLT; 4	MEM; 16	TEX; 6	PHO; 4	HOM; 5	2nd	5132
2009	Austin Dillon	2	Chevy	DAY	CAL	LVS	BRI	TEX	NSH	PHO; 34	TAL	RCH	DAR	CLT	DOV								IRP; 18	IOW; 28	GLN	MCH; 19	BRI	CGV	ATL	RCH	DOV	KAN	CAL	CLT	MEM	TEX	PHO	HOM	50th	452
2009	Sean Caisse	2	Chevy													NSH; 29	KEN	MLW	NHA; 22	DAY	CHI	GTY																	50th	452
2011	Elliott Sadler	2	Chevy	DAY; 38	PHO; 12	LVS; 12	BRI; 4	CAL; 5	TEX; 5	TAL; 5	NSH; 13	RCH; 4	DAR; 3	DOV; 6	IOW; 5	CLT; 10	CHI; 11	MCH; 8	ROA; 4	DAY; 8*	KEN; 5	NHA; 12	NSH; 30	IRP; 16	IOW; 3	GLN; 10	CGV; 10	BRI; 8	ATL; 10	RCH; 6	CHI; 6	DOV; 14	KAN; 3	CLT; 4	TEX; 9	PHO; 27	HOM; 6		6th	1177
2012	Elliott Sadler	2	Chevy	DAY; 3	PHO; 1	LVS; 3	BRI; 1	CAL; 9	TEX; 12	RCH; 6	TAL; 10	DAR; 24	IOW; 2	CLT; 5	DOV; 7	MCH; 11	ROA; 15	KEN; 9	DAY; 6	NHA; 7	CHI; 1	IND; 15	IOW; 1	GLN; 12	CGV; 4	BRI; 5	ATL; 4	RCH; 12	CHI; 8	KEN; 5*	DOV; 4	CLT; 3	KAN; 4	TEX; 11	PHO; 22	HOM; 9			3rd	1228
2013	Brian Scott	2	Chevy	DAY; 6	PHO; 10	LVS; 9	BRI; 10	CAL; 8	TEX; 11	RCH; 20	TAL; 27	DAR; 14	CLT; 15	DOV; 14	IOW; 6	MCH; 10	ROA; 20	KEN; 17	DAY; 17	NHA; 4	CHI; 11	IND; 2	IOW; 13	GLN; 11	MOH; 12	BRI; 9	ATL; 10	RCH; 2*	CHI; 14	KEN; 11	DOV; 11	KAN; 18	CLT; 12	TEX; 8	PHO; 13	HOM; 32			11th	1053
2014	Brian Scott	2	Chevy	DAY; 17	PHO; 12	LVS; 7	BRI; 14	CAL; 12	TEX; 12	DAR; 11	RCH; 5	TAL; 33	IOW; 6	CLT; 5	DOV; 7	MCH; 5	ROA; 16	KEN; 8	DAY; 16	NHA; 7	CHI; 6	IND; 7	IOW; 7	GLN; 10	MOH; 3*	BRI; 11	ATL; 7	RCH; 5	CHI; 9	KEN; 2	DOV; 7	KAN; 9	CLT; 10	TEX; 6	PHO; 7	HOM; 10			7th	1154
2015	Brian Scott	2	Chevy	DAY; 25	ATL; 7	LVS; 38	PHO; 10	CAL; 6	TEX; 10	BRI; 8	RCH; 7	TAL; 2	IOW; 4	CLT; 20	DOV; 36	MCH; 9	CHI; 8	DAY; 23*	KEN; 19	NHA; 29	IND; 11	IOW; 3	GLN; 6	MOH; 7	BRI; 6	ROA; 3	DAR; 12	RCH; 3	CHI; 17	KEN; 13	DOV; 31	CLT; 13	KAN; 23	TEX; 7	PHO; 11	HOM; 4			13th	1032
2016	Austin Dillon	2	Chevy	DAY; 5		LVS; 6	PHO; 7	CAL; 1	TEX; 8	BRI; 4	RCH; 5	TAL; 6		CLT; 2				DAY; 28	KEN; 2	NHA; 5					BRI; 1			RCH; 7				CLT; 14	KAN; 17	TEX; 7	PHO; 2	HOM; 5			6th	2234
2016	Paul Menard	2	Chevy		ATL; 4								DOV; 29		POC; 7	MCH; 3					IND; 3		GLN; 2				DAR; 20		CHI; 9										6th	2234
2016	Ben Kennedy	2	Chevy														IOW; 10																						6th	2234
2016	Sam Hornish Jr.	2	Chevy																			IOW; 6		MOH; 2						KEN; 4									6th	2234
2016	Michael McDowell	2	Chevy																							ROA; 1*													6th	2234
2016	Regan Smith	2	Chevy																												DOV; 13								6th	2234
2017	Austin Dillon	2	Chevy	DAY; 3	ATL; 8	LVS; 5	PHO; 33		TEX; 4	BRI; 13	RCH; 4		CLT; 3	DOV; 28											BRI; 8		DAR; 10		CHI; 5		DOV; 23	CLT; 4	KAN; 6	TEX; 10	PHO; 9				10th	2193
2017	Paul Menard	2	Chevy					CAL; 36							POC; 31	MCH; 7			KEN; 34		IND; 2		GLN; 5					RCH; 19											10th	2193
2017	Ben Kennedy	2	Chevy									TAL; 4					IOW; 20	DAY; 16		NHA; 6		IOW; 23		MOH; 26		ROA; 18				KEN; 11						HOM; 18			10th	2193
2018	Matt Tifft	2	Chevy	DAY; 19	ATL; 12	LVS; 11	PHO; 7	CAL; 8	TEX; 6	BRI; 35	RCH; 4	TAL; 25	DOV; 8	CLT; 9	POC; 14	MCH; 16	IOW; 9	CHI; 16	DAY; 20	KEN; 11	NHA; 5	IOW; 26	GLN; 37	MOH; 4	BRI; 10	ROA; 2	DAR; 8	IND; 6	LVS; 36	RCH; 5	CLT; 6	DOV; 15	KAN; 6	TEX; 7	PHO; 3	HOM; 10			12th	2254
2019	Tyler Reddick	2	Chevy	DAY; 9	ATL; 5	LVS; 14	PHO; 3	CAL; 4	TEX; 2	BRI; 2	RCH; 4	TAL; 1*	DOV; 3	CLT; 1*	POC; 2	MCH; 1	IOW; 15	CHI; 9	DAY; 16	KEN; 3	NHA; 4	IOW; 5	GLN; 5	MOH; 4	BRI; 1	ROA; 3	DAR; 2*	IND; 30	LVS; 1	RCH; 10	CLT; 2	DOV; 12	KAN; 2	TEX; 29	PHO; 3	HOM; 1*			1st	4040
2021	Myatt Snider	2	Chevy	DAY; 7	DAY; 13	HOM; 1	LVS; 32	PHO; 11	ATL; 11	MAR; 15	TAL; 9	DAR; 19	DOV; 16	COA; 21	CLT; 26	MOH; 29	TEX; 33	NSH; 31	POC; 10	ROA; 23	ATL; 21	NHA; 7	GLN; 15	IND; 7	MCH; 36	DAY; 8	DAR; 9	RCH; 25	BRI; 8	LVS; 15	TAL; 31	CLT; 8	TEX; 21	KAN; 10	MAR; 13	PHO; 19			10th	2172
2022	Sheldon Creed	2	Chevy	DAY; 6	CAL; 32	LVS; 7	PHO; 14	ATL; 9	COA; 10	RCH; 22	MAR; 30	TAL; 24	DOV; 8	DAR; 38	TEX; 26	CLT; 8	PIR; 32	NSH; 36	ROA; 27	ATL; 12	NHA; 5	POC; 5	IND; 23	MCH; 11	GLN; 8	DAY; 36	DAR; 2	KAN; 11	BRI; 37	TEX; 7	TAL; 12	ROV; 16	LVS; 37	HOM; 17	MAR; 2	PHO; 6			14th	751
2023	Sheldon Creed	2	Chevy	DAY; 34	CAL; 23	LVS; 9	PHO; 3	ATL; 21	COA; 9	RCH; 6	MAR; 27	TAL; 2	DOV; 11	DAR; 25	CLT; 28	PIR; 7*	SON; 11	NSH; 17	CSC; 11	ATL; 35	NHA; 21	POC; 11	ROA; 26	MCH; 12	IRC; 8	GLN; 2	DAY; 2	DAR; 8	KAN; 3	BRI; 11	TEX; 8	ROV; 10	LVS; 15	HOM; 26	MAR; 2	PHO; 2			8th	2224
2024	Jesse Love	2	Chevy	DAY; 20*	ATL; 12*	LVS; 17	PHO; 2	COA; 6	RCH; 5	MAR; 9	TEX; 9	TAL; 1	DOV; 24	DAR; 8	CLT; 28	PIR; 19	SON; 12	IOW; 31	NHA; 13	NSH; 3	CSC; 5	POC; 22	IND; 13	MCH; 29	DAY; 21	DAR; 6	ATL; 6	GLN; 8	BRI; 4	KAN; 9	TAL; 6*	ROV; 19	LVS; 6	HOM; 4	MAR; 12	PHO; 6			9th	2246
2025	Jesse Love	2	Chevy	DAY; 1	ATL; 16	COA; 6	PHO; 9	LVS; 3	HOM; 6	MAR; 36	DAR; 11	BRI; 6	CAR; 37	TAL; 3	TEX; 7	CLT; 12	NSH; 8	MXC; 18	POC; 2	ATL; 6	CSC; 6	SON; 38	DOV; 5	IND; 9	IOW; 2	GLN; 14	DAY; 4	PIR; 10	GTW; 5	BRI; 25	KAN; 7	ROV; 12	LVS; 6	TAL; 10	MAR; 23	PHO; 1			5th	2258
2026	Jesse Love	2	Chevy	DAY; 9	ATL; 5	COA; 4	PHO; 2*	LVS; 6	DAR; 11	MAR; 12	CAR; 27	BRI; 13	KAN; 4	TAL; 7*	TEX; 9	GLN; 2	DOV; 23	CLT; 2	NSH; 16*	POC; 37	COR; 6	SON; 9	CHI; 3	ATL; 26	IND; 16	IOW; 35	DAY; 20	DAR; 13	GTW; 1	BRI; 17	LVS; 3	CLT; 2*	PHO; 1*	TAL; 3	MAR; 30	HOM; 4			2nd	2458

=== Car No. 3 history ===
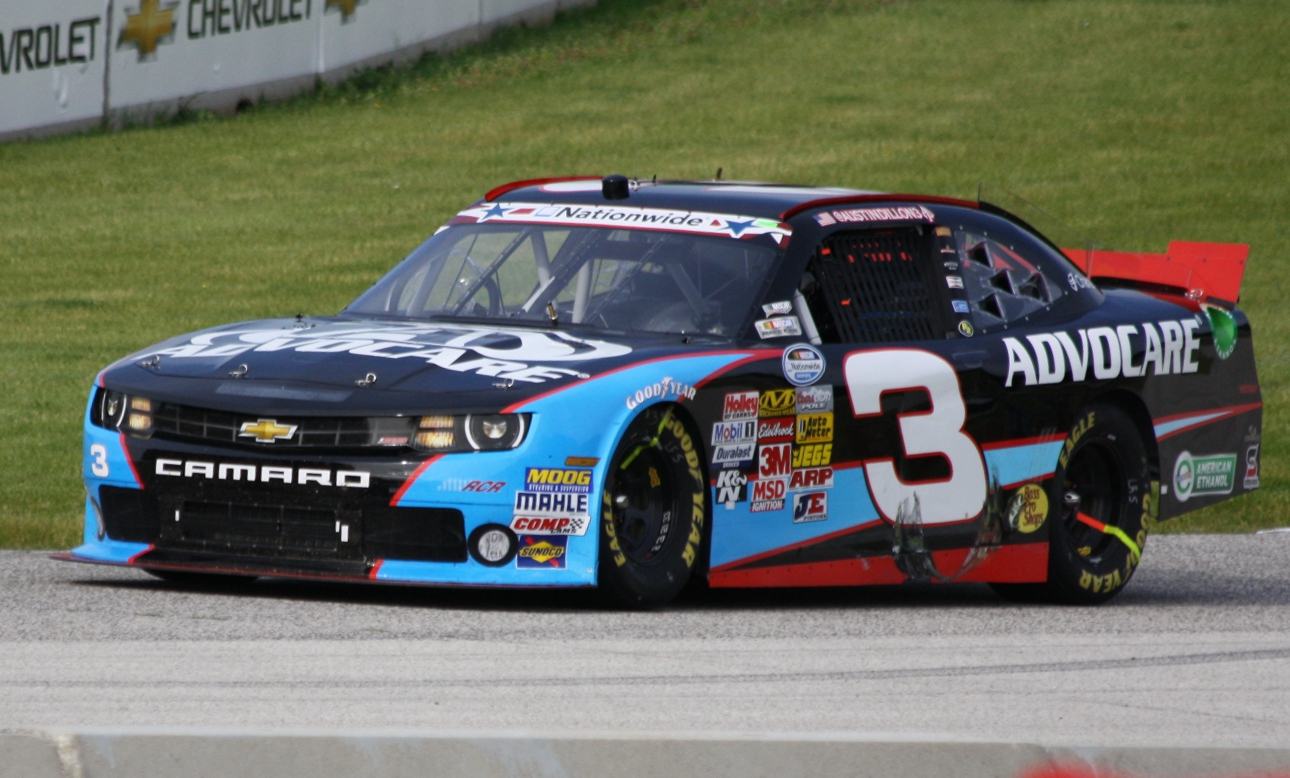
Austin Dillon won the 2013 Nationwide Championship.

Dale Earnhardt Jr (2002, 2010)

The No. 3 car was initially run in the then-Busch Series by Dale Earnhardt, Inc. beginning in 1989, winning two back-to-back championships with Dale Earnhardt Jr. in 1998 and 1999. The No. 3 made its debut as part of the RCR stable in 2002 at the EAS/GNC Live Well 300 at Daytona, driven twice that year by Earnhardt Jr. with sponsorships from the Nabisco brands Oreo and Nilla. Earnhardt won the Daytona race but finished 36th at the Carquest Auto Parts 300 at Charlotte after being involved in a crash. The No. 3 car returned for one race in 2010 at the Subway Jalapeño 250 at Daytona with a sponsorship from Wrangler, in a joint venture between RCR, JR Motorsports, and Dale Earnhardt, Inc. The car was once again driven by Earnhardt Jr. with a paint scheme resembling the one used by his late father when he first drove for RCR. Earnhardt would go on to win the race, his first victory in 87 Nationwide Series starts, and the first victory in a Nationwide Car of Tomorrow. Prior to the start, Earnhardt Jr. claimed that it would most likely be the last time he would drive the No. 3 car.

Austin Dillon (2012–2013)

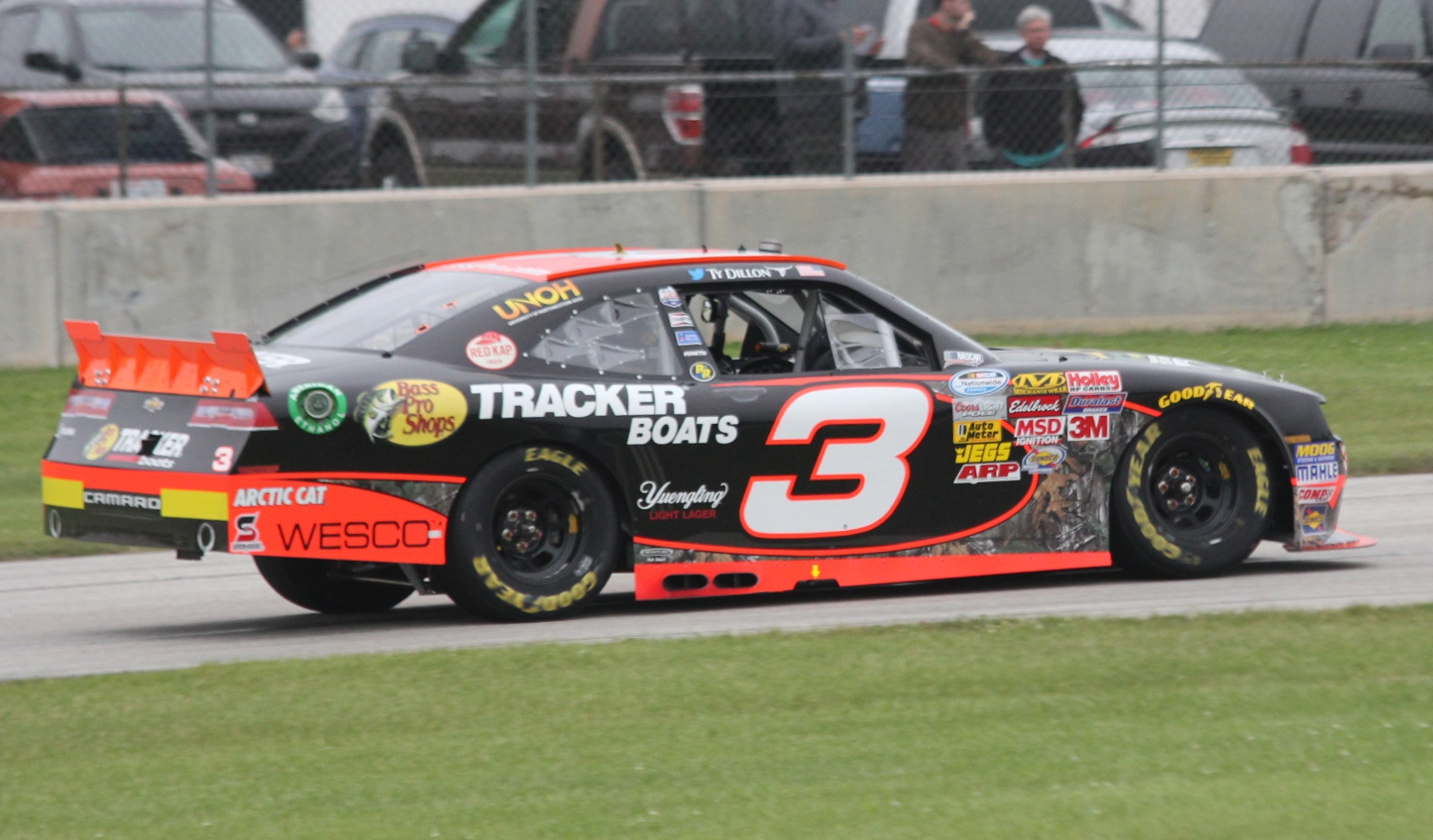
Ty Dillon's 2014 Nationwide Series car

In 2012, the team moved to full-time status with Childress's grandson Austin Dillon driving, led by crew chief Danny Stockman. The team had a sponsorship from AdvoCare for twenty races, and Bass Pro Shops and American Ethanol for the others. Dillon stayed in the championship hunt throughout the season, sweeping both Kentucky races and easily claiming Rookie of the Year. Dillon would finish third in points behind teammate Elliott Sadler and champion Ricky Stenhouse Jr. Dillon returned in 2013, with a sponsorship from AdvoCare covering the entire season. Despite not going to victory lane, the No. 3 team scored five consecutive poles midway through the season and seven total on the year. Dillon managed to stay consistent enough to beat Sam Hornish Jr. for the championship, becoming the first team to win a championship without a victory. Austin would move up to the Cup Series in 2014.

Ty Dillon (2014–2017)

For 2014, younger brother Ty Dillon took over the No. 3 for 2014 with sponsorships from Yuengling, Bass Pro Shops, and WESCO. Dillon earned a pole in the third race of the season at Las Vegas, and scored his first career victory at the famed Indianapolis Motor Speedway after leading 24 laps, one of only three rookies to win a race in 2014. Dillon earned three poles, seven top-five finishes, and 24 top-tens en route to a fifth-place points finish, losing Rookie of the Year honors to champion Chase Elliott. He followed it up with a career-best third place in points for 2015 and fifth place in 2016 despite not winning a race either year.

Multiple drivers (2017–2018)

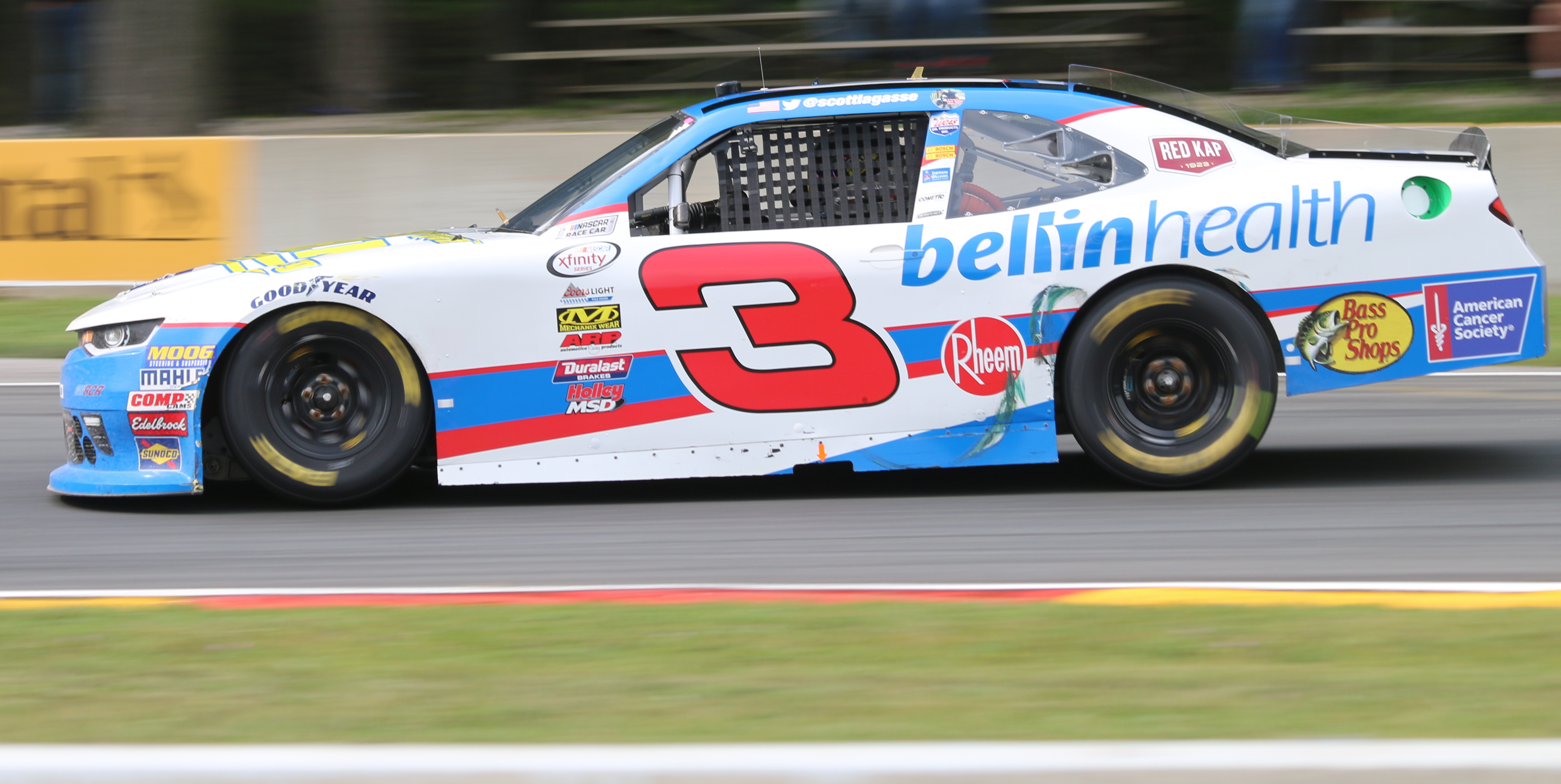
Lagasse in the Childress No. 3 car at Road America in 2017

In 2017, Ty Dillon would run 27 of the 33 races alongside his rookie Cup Series campaign. Scott Lagasse Jr. and Brian Scott would round out the No. 3's schedule.

In 2018, Ty would share the No. 3 with his brother Austin along with Jeb Burton and Shane Lee. Brendan Gaughan also drove the No. 3 in 2018.

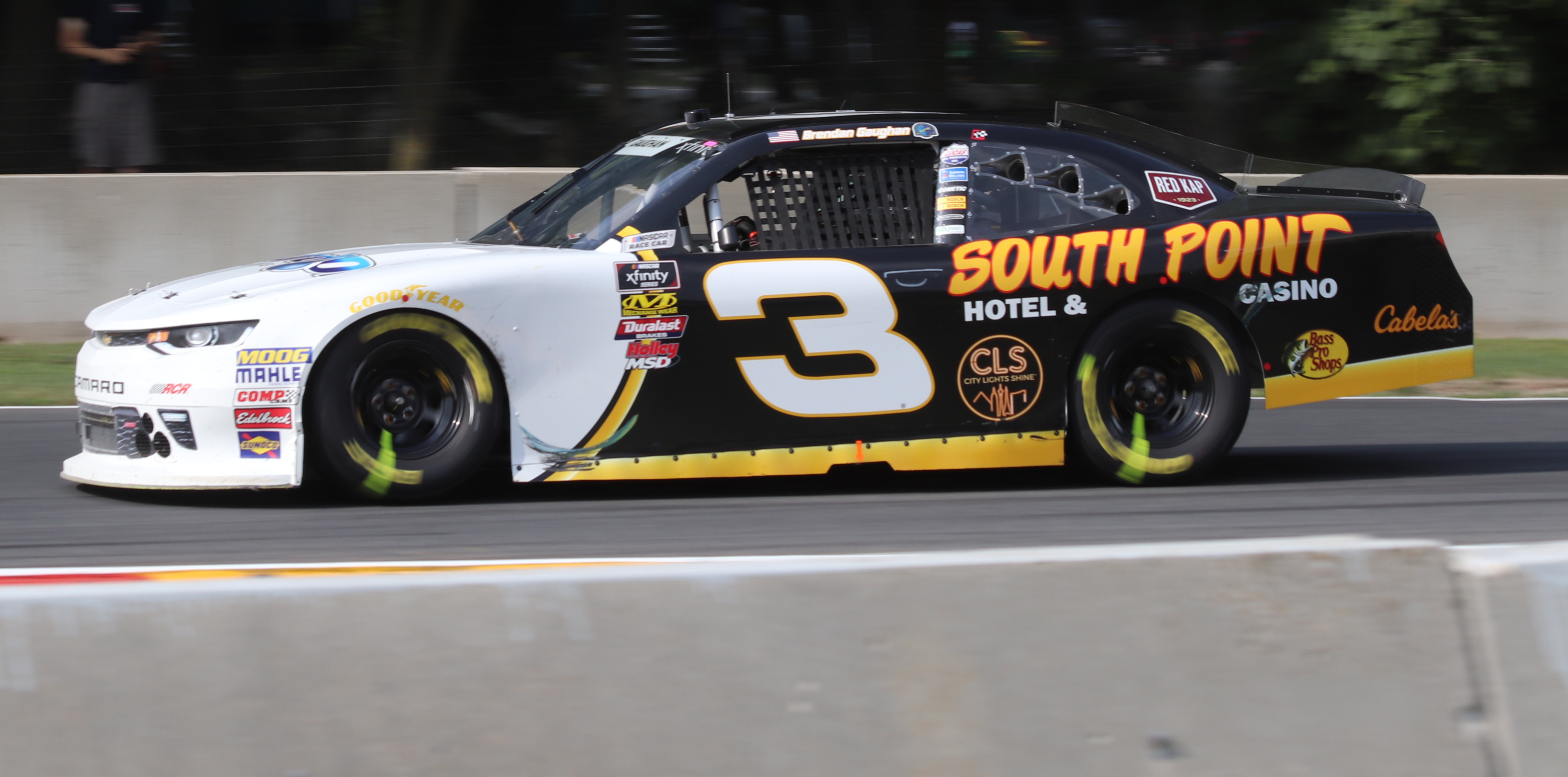
2018 Xfinity car at Road America driven by Brendan Gaughan

Part-time (2022–2023, 2025)

The No. 3 car returned for one race in 2022. The car was driven by Jeffrey Earnhardt. He finished the race in a career-best second place.

On January 25, 2023, RCR announced Ty Dillon will drive the No. 3 car part time in 2023 with sponsorship coming from Ferris.

On May 19, 2025, RCR announced Austin Dillon will drive the No. 3 car for the BetMGM 300 with sponsorship coming from Boot Barn.

On April 13, 2026, it was announced that Austin would drive the No. 3 car at Texas with Boot Barn returning as the sponsor.

==== Car No. 3 results ====
Year	Team	No.	Make	1	2	3	4	5	6	7	8	9	10	11	12	13	14	15	16	17	18	19	20	21	22	23	24	25	26	27	28	29	30	31	32	33	34	35	Owners	Pts
2002	Dale Earnhardt Jr.	3	Chevy	DAY; 1*	CAR	LVS	DAR	BRI	TEX	NSH	TAL	CAL	RCH	NHA	NZH	CLT; 36	DOV	NSH	KEN	MLW	DAY	CHI	GTY	PPR	IRP	MCH	BRI	DAR	RCH	DOV	KAN	CLT	MEM	ATL	CAR	PHO	HOM		68th	240
2010	Dale Earnhardt Jr.	3	Chevy	DAY	CAL	LVS	BRI	NSH	PHO	TEX	TAL	RCH	DAR	DOV	CLT	NSH	KEN	ROA	NHA	DAY; 1*	CHI	GTY	IRP	IOW	GLN	MCH	BRI	CGV	ATL	RCH	DOV	KAN	CAL	CLT	GTY	TEX	PHO	HOM	57th	195
2012	Austin Dillon	3	Chevy	DAY; 5	PHO; 4	LVS; 7	BRI; 12	CAL; 5	TEX; 5	RCH; 9	TAL; 17	DAR; 5	IOW; 4	CLT; 11	DOV; 6	MCH; 5	ROA; 18	KEN; 1*	DAY; 4	NHA; 3	CHI; 6	IND; 5	IOW; 15	GLN; 23	CGV; 9	BRI; 4	ATL; 6	RCH; 6	CHI; 3	KEN; 1	DOV; 10	CLT; 6	KAN; 2	TEX; 6	PHO; 6	HOM; 5			4th	1227
2013	Austin Dillon	3	Chevy	DAY; 21	PHO; 6	LVS; 6	BRI; 11	CAL; 5	TEX; 3	RCH; 35	TAL; 10	DAR; 11	CLT; 14	DOV; 8	IOW; 2	MCH; 20	ROA; 10	KEN; 6	DAY; 5	NHA; 3	CHI; 3	IND; 12	IOW; 4	GLN; 12	MOH; 21	BRI; 3	ATL; 8	RCH; 12	CHI; 4	KEN; 2	DOV; 6	KAN; 6	CLT; 2	TEX; 5	PHO; 3	HOM; 12			3rd	1180
2014	Ty Dillon	3	Chevy	DAY; 7	PHO; 10	LVS; 11	BRI; 6	CAL; 8	TEX; 9	DAR; 10	RCH; 14	TAL; 15	IOW; 8	CLT; 10	DOV; 8	MCH; 9	ROA; 19	KEN; 7	DAY; 11	NHA; 12	CHI; 5	IND; 1	IOW; 5	GLN; 8	MOH; 19	BRI; 4	ATL; 9	RCH; 9	CHI; 7	KEN; 3*	DOV; 10	KAN; 5	CLT; 30	TEX; 15	PHO; 4	HOM; 7			8th	1148
2015	Ty Dillon	3	Chevy	DAY; 3	ATL; 3	LVS; 8	PHO; 6	CAL; 14	TEX; 12	BRI; 5	RCH; 9	TAL; 8	IOW; 14	CLT; 7	DOV; 8	MCH; 13	CHI; 9	DAY; 26	KEN; 15	NHA; 6	IND; 9	IOW; 4	GLN; 5	MOH; 3	BRI; 4	ROA; 10	DAR; 15	RCH; 8	CHI; 5	KEN; 2	DOV; 28	CLT; 6	KAN; 4	TEX; 5	PHO; 5	HOM; 7			7th	1172
2016	Ty Dillon	3	Chevy	DAY; 13	ATL; 5	LVS; 7	PHO; 6	CAL; 17	TEX; 13	BRI; 7	RCH; 2	TAL; 19	DOV; 5	CLT; 8	POC; 3	MCH; 15	IOW; 2	DAY; 14	KEN; 7	NHA; 34	IND; 9	IOW; 2	GLN; 11	MOH; 4	BRI; 25	ROA; 12	DAR; 12	RCH; 6	CHI; 11	KEN; 27	DOV; 2	CLT; 11	KAN; 12	TEX; 16	PHO; 7	HOM; 2			9th	2214
2017	Ty Dillon	3	Chevy	DAY; 19	ATL; 17	LVS; 24	PHO; 10	CAL; 10	TEX; 8	BRI; 6	RCH; 19	TAL; 14	CLT; 18	DOV; 10	POC; 8	MCH; 6		DAY; 21	KEN; 5	NHA; 8	IND; 10		GLN; 7		BRI; 4		DAR; 7	RCH; 3	CHI; 8		DOV; 13	CLT; 15	KAN; 9	TEX; 16	PHO; 13				11th	2182
2017	Scott Lagasse Jr.	3	Chevy														IOW; 32							MOH; 22		ROA; 23										HOM; 21			11th	2182
2017	Brian Scott	3	Chevy																			IOW; 3								KEN; 8									11th	2182
2018	Austin Dillon	3	Chevy	DAY; 32		LVS; 12		CAL; 4								MCH; 1					NHA; 10		GLN; 25																12th	2175
2018	Ty Dillon	3	Chevy		ATL; 13		PHO; 13		TEX; 12					CLT; 4						KEN; 14					BRI; 15		DAR; 9	IND; 33											12th	2175
2018	Shane Lee	3	Chevy							BRI; 14		TAL; 15			POC; 12		IOW; 16		DAY; 6			IOW; 13							LVS; 30	RCH; 9		DOV; 17	KAN; 4	TEX; 23	PHO; 14	HOM; 20			12th	2175
2018	Jeb Burton	3	Chevy								RCH; 12		DOV; 12					CHI; 34																					12th	2175
2018	Brendan Gaughan	3	Chevy																					MOH; 12		ROA; 24					CLT; 17								12th	2175
2022	Jeffrey Earnhardt	3	Chevy	DAY	CAL	LVS	PHO	ATL	COA	RCH	MAR	TAL; 2	DOV	DAR	TEX	CLT	PIR	NSH	ROA	ATL	NHA	POC	IND	MCH	GLN	DAY	DAR	KAN	BRI	TEX	TAL	CLT	LVS	HOM	MAR	PHO			44th	38
2023	Ty Dillon	3	Chevy	DAY	CAL	LVS	PHO	ATL	COA	RCH	MAR	TAL	DOV	DAR; 18	CLT	PIR	SON	NSH	CSC	ATL	NHA	POC; 14	ROA	MCH	IRC	GLN	DAY	DAR	KAN	BRI	TEX	ROV	LVS	HOM	MAR	PHO			44th	41
2025	Austin Dillon	3	Chevy	DAY	ATL	COA	PHO	LVS	HOM	MAR	DAR	BRI	CAR	TAL	TEX	CLT; 13	NSH	MXC	POC	ATL	CSC	SON	DOV	IND	IOW	GLN	DAY	PIR	GTW	BRI	KAN	ROV	LVS	TAL	MAR	PHO			43rd	24
2026	Austin Dillon	3	Chevy	DAY	ATL	COA	PHO	LVS	DAR	MAR	CAR	BRI	KAN	TAL	TEX; 23	GLN	DOV	CLT	NSH	POC	COR	SON	CHI	ATL	IND	IOW	DAY	DAR	GTW	BRI	LVS	CLT	PHO	TAL	MAR	HOM			46th	14

=== Car No. 12 history ===
RCR made its debut in the Busch Series in 1995 by fielding the No. 12 Kennametal/Salem National Lease Chevrolet for Mike Dillon. He made his first start at Hickory, where he started twelfth and finished sixteenth. He would make his next start at Myrtle Beach, getting his first career top-ten starting spot of ninth, before leading five laps en route to a seventeenth place finish. He would then follow it up with an eighteenth place result at South Boston Speedway. Dillon crashed out of the other two races, with a 42nd at Charlotte and 29th at Rockingham. However, he did beat his best career start with an eighth place start in Charlotte.

==== Car No. 12 results ====
Year	Team	No.	Make	1	2	3	4	5	6	7	8	9	10	11	12	13	14	15	16	17	18	19	20	21	22	23	24	25	26	Owners	Pts
1995	Mike Dillon	12	Chevy	DAY	CAR	RCH	ATL	NSV	DAR	BRI	HCY; 16	NHA	NZH	CLT	DOV	MYB; 17	GLN	MLW	TAL	SBO; 18	IRP	MCH	BRI	DAR	RCH	DOV	CLT; 42	CAR; 29	HOM		

=== Car No. 21 history ===
Mike Dillon (2000)

The No. 21 debuted in 2000, with Rockwell Automation as the sponsor and Childress' son-in-law Mike Dillon as the driver. Dillon posted two top-ten finishes and finished 23rd in points that year.

Multiple drivers (2001)

Six races into 2001, Dillon was injured at Bristol Motor Speedway and it was announced at the time he would be out for the rest of the season. Since then, he has taken on other roles with the team. His replacement was Mike Skinner but after his injury, Jeff Purvis briefly took over, winning at Pikes Peak, before Skinner returned. After Skinner's release, Robby Gordon had the driving duties for the balance of the season.

Jeff Green and Jay Sauter (2002)

The next year, Jeff Green and Jay Sauter drove the car. With Green winning twice at Bristol and Charlotte and Sauter having a best finish of fourth at Nashville

Kevin Harvick and others (2003–2007)

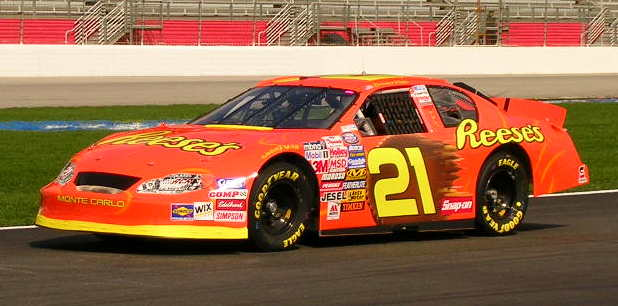
Brandon Miller in the No. 21 at Atlanta Motor Speedway in 2005

In 2003, the team set out to win the Busch Series Owner's Championship with a sponsorship from The Hershey Company's PayDay brand. Cup Series driver Kevin Harvick was tabbed to drive 15 of the 34 races, with development driver Johnny Sauter filling out the rest of the schedule. Harvick ended up competing nineteen races, with three wins and top-tens in all but one race, and RCR became the first team to win an owner's points title with two different drivers. Harvick would serve as the team's anchor driver there afterwards, with Clint Bowyer doing the co-driving honors in 2004 and Brandon Miller in 2005 and sponsorships from Reese's Peanut Butter Cups. Jeff Burton drove the car at Bristol in 2005. In 2006, Harvick and Burton split the driving duties in the car with sponsorship from United States Coast Guard, as Harvick attempted to run the entire Busch Series schedule in three different cars. Burton won at Atlanta, and Harvick won three more races, pulling out to an over 700-point lead in the points standings with five races to go in the 2006 season. AutoZone replaced the sponsorship with Coast Guard in 2007, and Harvick drove along with development driver Timothy Peters, until Peters was replaced by multiple dirt late model series champion Tim McCreadie.

Multiple drivers (2008, 2010)

Beginning in 2008, Bobby Labonte was tapped to drive the 21 car for 15 races of the season. In May 2008, the team shut down due to financial problems but returned at the Emerson Radio 250 to debut Austin Dillon, son of former driver Mike Dillon and grandson to Richard Childress.

In 2010, RCR hired John Wes Townley as the driver of car No. 21, with family-owned Zaxby's as the sponsor. On April 9, Townley was pulled from the No. 21 car after a practice crash at Phoenix, which had proceeded an arrest for possession of alcohol as a minor. RCR said the move was for precautionary reasons, but Townley never returned to the team and would return to his former team RAB Racing. Clint Bowyer took over driving duties at Phoenix, and Scott Riggs drove at Nashville and Kentucky in June. Zaxby's, meanwhile, scaled back to sponsoring 21 of the season's 35 races. After the July Daytona race, Morgan Shepherd stepped behind the wheel for several weeks, taking a break for Bristol to handle his car for Faith Motorsports, which didn't make the field. RCR and Shepherd formed Shepherd Racing Ventures on August 31 to keep the No. 21 running the rest of the year. Bowyer drove with the Zaxby's sponsorship at Atlanta, Richmond, Charlotte, and Texas while Shepherd drove either without a sponsor or with limited sponsorship from Zaxby's and other companies for the other seven races. Following the season, Shepherd returned full-time to his Faith Motorsports operation with RCR transferring the No. 21 owners points to Shepherd, while RCR shut the 21 team down.

Part-time (2011–2013)

In 2011, RCR briefly restarted its Nationwide program, running a few races with development driver Tim George Jr. and sponsorship from Applebee's. In 2012, the No. 21 ran at Charlotte and Homestead with Joey Coulter. The car returned in 2013 with Dakoda Armstrong, Brendan Gaughan, and Kevin Harvick driving, taking a best finish of fifth at Indianapolis.

Daniel Hemric (2017–2018)

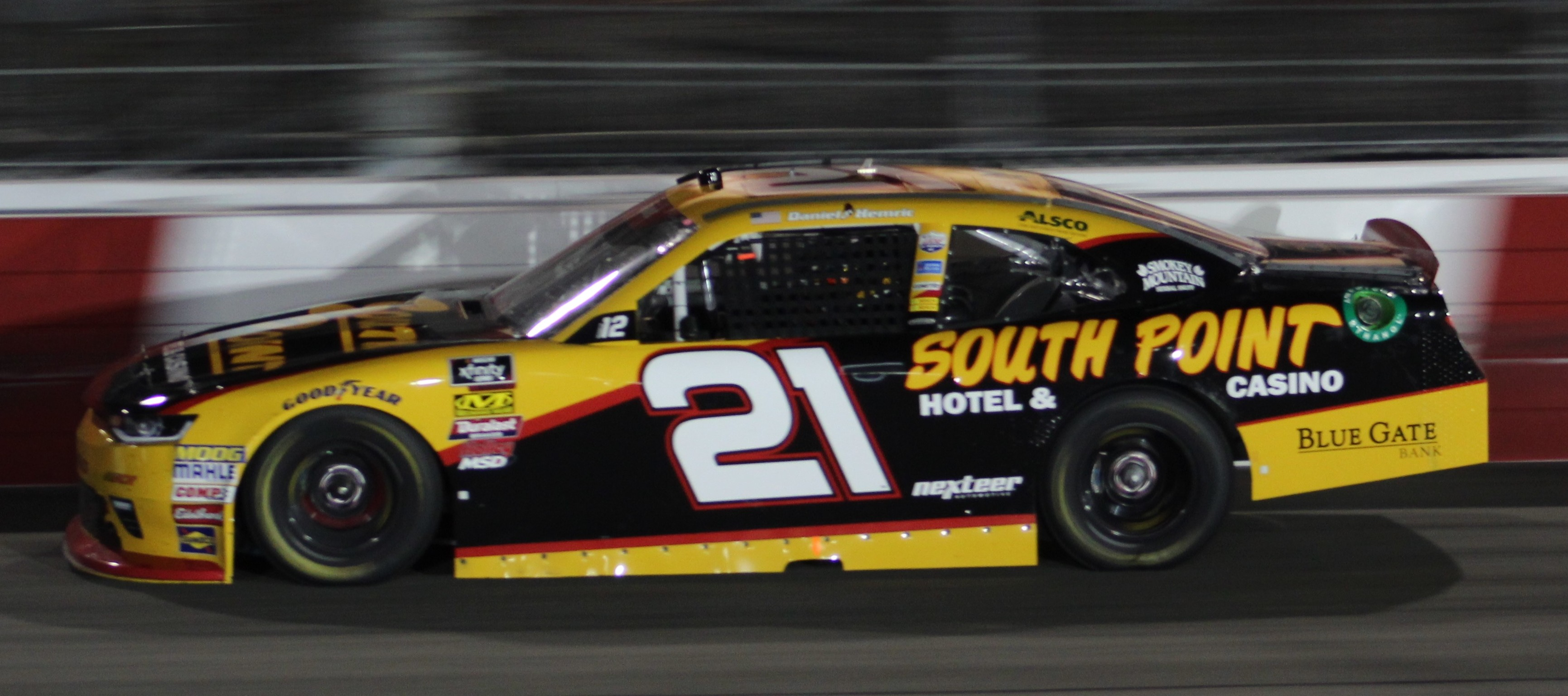
Daniel Hemric in the No. 21 at Richmond Raceway in 2018

The No. 21 was revived for Daniel Hemric who drove full-time in 2017 and 2018. Despite being a consistent front runner, Hemric never won a race before moving up to the Cup series for the 2019 season.

Part-time (2019)

RCR cut back to one full-time team with the No. 21 running a limited schedule with Kaz Grala and Joe Graf Jr.

Multiple drivers (2020)

In 2020, the No. 21 was returned to full-time competition after inheriting the No. 2 owner points. This car was shared by Myatt Snider, Anthony Alfredo, Kaz Grala, and Earl Bamber.

Austin Hill (2022–2026)

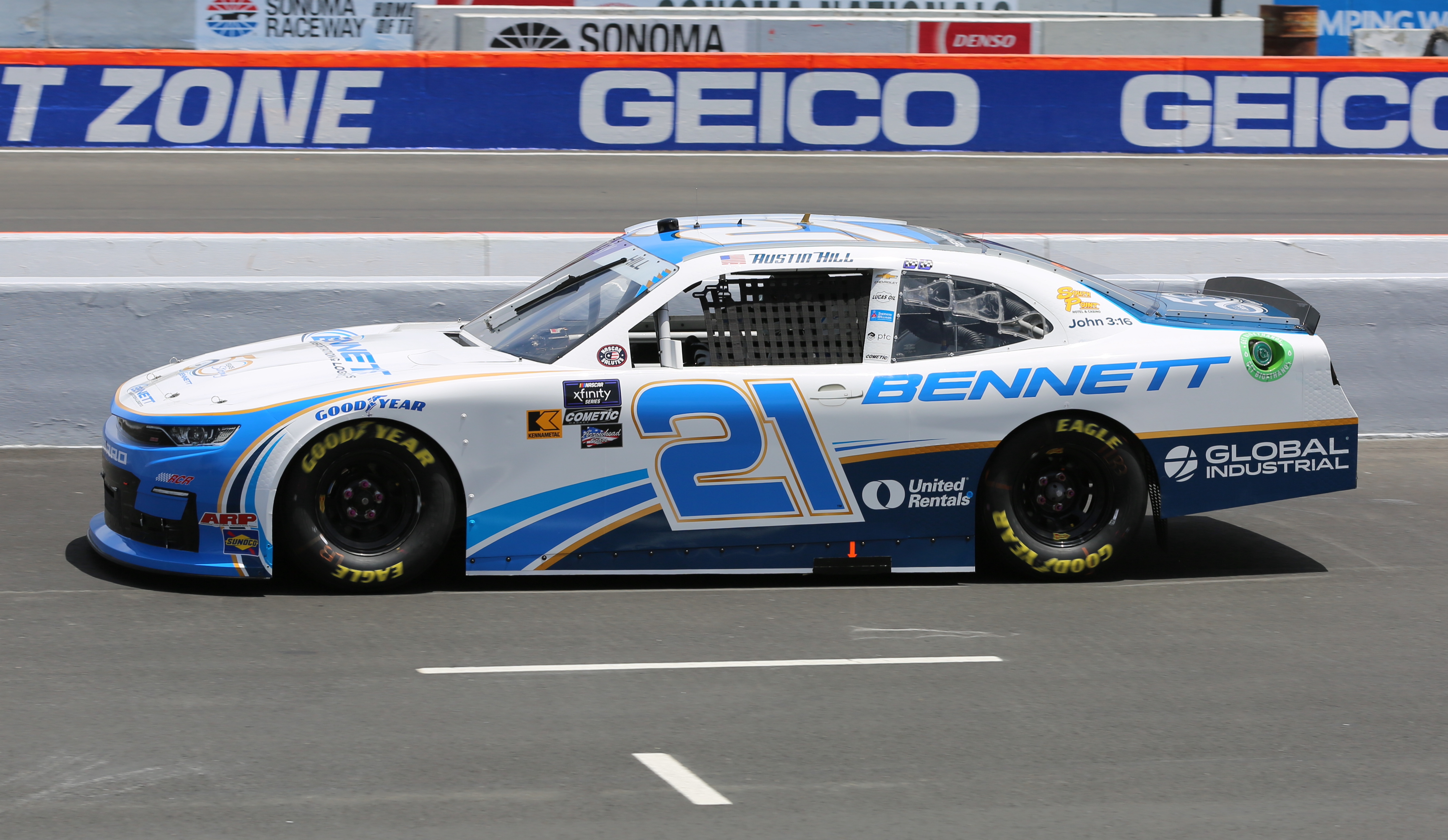
Austin Hill in the No. 21 at Sonoma Raceway in 2024

On October 29, 2021, it was announced that RCR would field two full-time cars again in 2022, with their second car driven by Austin Hill. On January 21, 2022, RCR revealed on their website that Hill's car number would be the No. 21. Hill began the season with a win at Daytona. He also won at Atlanta on his way to the playoffs. Hill was eliminated following the Round of 8 after finishing ninth at Martinsville as a result of a collision with Snider. Following the race, Hill punched Snider in the face on pit road. At the end of the season, he finished sixth in the points standings and won the 2022 NASCAR Xfinity Series Rookie of the Year honors.

Hill began the 2023 season by winning his second straight season opener at Daytona. He also scored wins at Las Vegas, Atlanta, and Pocono.

In 2024, Hill made history by winning his third straight season opener at Daytona. In the next round at Atlanta, his team used fuel strategy to help him take his second win in a row. At Charlotte, Hill and Cole Custer were trading paint on the frontstretch for fifth place when contact blew a right front tire on Hill's car. He crashed in turn 1 and collected Custer. Hill, showing his displeasure for how he was raced, locked bumpers with Custer's car and left-reared Custer's damaged car on the backstretch, which sent him into the inside wall. As a result, Hill was fined US$25,000 and docked 25 points. Later in the year, Hill won his third race of the season at Atlanta. During the playoffs, he won at Homestead to make the Championship 4.

Hill started the 2025 season with a 33rd place DNF at Daytona. A week later, he rebounded with a win at Atlanta. Hill also scored wins at Martinsville and Talladega. At Indianapolis, Hill was penalized five laps for intentionally right-rear hooking Aric Almirola to the outside wall. Due to the incident, Hill was suspended for one race at Iowa, with Austin Dillon substituting for him. After getting eliminated during the first round of the playoffs, he won at Talladega, sweeping Talladega for the season.

Hill started the 2026 season with another win at Daytona after dominating the night. He would also go on to win at the inaugural race at Naval Base Coronado.

Chandler Smith (2027–)

On August 26, 2026, it was announced that Chandler Smith would drive the No. 21 car full-time in 2027 as part of a multi-year agreement.

==== Car No. 21 results ====
Year	Driver	No.	Make	1	2	3	4	5	6	7	8	9	10	11	12	13	14	15	16	17	18	19	20	21	22	23	24	25	26	27	28	29	30	31	32	33	34	35	Owners	Pts
2000	Mike Dillon	21	Chevy	DAY; 9	CAR; 17	LVS; 22	ATL; 19	DAR; 13	BRI; 37	TEX; 38	NSV; 37	TAL; 34	CAL; 28	RCH; 19	NHA; 36	CLT; 18	DOV; 32	SBO; 20	MYB; 37	GLN; 19	MLW; 25	NZH; 37	PPR; 20	GTY; 32	IRP; 12	MCH; 22	BRI; 32	DAR; 21	RCH; 17	DOV; 8	CLT; 20	CAR; 36	MEM; 27	PHO; 31	HOM; DNQ				25th	2774
2001	Mike Dillon	21	Chevy	DAY; 29	CAR; 19	LVS; 18	ATL; 20	DAR; 28	BRI; 37																														6th	4046
2001	Mike Skinner	21	Chevy							TEX; 9	NSH; 6	TAL; 5	CAL; 23	RCH; 3	NHA; 3		CLT; 5	DOV; 4		MLW; 11		CHI; 2				MCH; 6	BRI; 11	DAR; 24		DOV; 19									6th	4046
2001	Ted Christopher	21	Chevy													NZH; 19																							6th	4046
2001	Travis Kvapil	21	Chevy																KEN; 28																				6th	4046
2001	Robby Gordon	21	Chevy																		GLN; 5										KAN; 11	CLT; 23							6th	4046
2001	Jeff Purvis	21	Chevy																				GTY; 15	PPR; 1*	IRP; 21														6th	4046
2001	Johnny Sauter	21	Chevy																										RCH; 5				MEM; 13	PHO; 11	CAR; 30	HOM; 35			6th	4046
2002	Jeff Green	21	Chevy	DAY; 25	CAR; 11*	LVS; 5	DAR; 3	BRI; 1*	TEX; 5			CAL; 2	RCH; 39			CLT; 1	DOV; 2					CHI; 7				MCH; 3	BRI; 5	DAR; 3	RCH; 12	DOV; 4*	KAN; 7	CLT; 4		ATL; 17	CAR; 6*	PHO; 31	HOM; 10		3rd	4503
2002	Jay Sauter	21	Chevy							NSH; 15	TAL; 30			NHA; 30	NZH; 7			NSH; 4	KEN; 21	MLW; 13	DAY; 37		GTY; 13	PPR; 17	IRP; 36								MEM; 8						3rd	4503
2003	Kevin Harvick	21	Chevy	DAY; 3	CAR; 10	LVS; 2*		BRI; 1*				CAL; 3*	RCH; 1			CLT; 9							NHA; 2*			MCH; 1	BRI; 5*	DAR; 5*	RCH; 2	DOV; 9		CLT; 9		ATL; 9	PHO; 2	CAR; 14	HOM; 6		1st	4898
2003	Johnny Sauter	21	Chevy				DAR; 5		TEX; 37	TAL; 26	NSH; 2			GTY; 7	NZH; 10		DOV; 21	NSH; 11	KEN; 17	MLW; 13	DAY; 5	CHI; 27		PPR; 4	IRP; 11						KAN; 34		MEM; 3						1st	4898
2004	Kevin Harvick	21	Chevy	DAY; 4	CAR; 3	LVS; 1	DAR; 21	BRI; 2				CAL; 8		RCH; 3		CLT; 3	DOV; 6				DAY; 8	CHI; 41	NHA; 5			MCH; 30	BRI; 4	CAL; 3	RCH; 7	DOV; 6		CLT; 11			PHO; 13	DAR; 23			4th	4465
2004	Clint Bowyer	21	Chevy						TEX; 36	NSH; 4	TAL; 22		GTY; 12		NZH; 18			NSH; 3	KEN; 10	MLW; 10				PPR; 4	IRP; 17						KAN; 32		MEM; 4	ATL; 20			HOM; 39		4th	4465
2005	Kevin Harvick	21	Chevy	DAY; 2	CAL; 2	MXC; 2	LVS; 2					PHO; 4	TAL; 18		RCH; 12	CLT; 11	DOV; 29*				DAY; 2	CHI; 1	NHA; 8*					MCH; 13	BRI; 3		RCH; 1*		KAN; 4	CLT; 24		TEX; 1	PHO; 4	HOM; 4	4th	4628
2005	Brandon Miller	21	Chevy					ATL; 32	NSH; 25		TEX; 36							NSH; 43	KEN; 16	MLW; 24				PPR; 10	GTY; 6	IRP; 39				CAL; 23					MEM; 20				4th	4628
2005	Jeff Burton	21	Chevy							BRI; 2*				DAR; 5													GLN; 6					DOV; 27							4th	4628
2006	Jeff Burton	21	Chevy	DAY; 30	CAL; 4			ATL; 1*		TEX; 6																								CLT; 35					1st	5577
2006	Kevin Harvick	21	Chevy			MXC; 3	LVS; 3*		BRI; 2*		NSH; 1	PHO; 1	TAL; 2	RCH; 1	DAR; 7	CLT; 8	DOV; 13	NSH; 6	KEN; 9	MLW; 19	DAY; 3	CHI; 4	NHA; 2	MAR; 1*	GTY; 5	IRP; 1*	GLN; 7	MCH; 8	BRI; 2	CAL; 2	RCH; 1*	DOV; 3	KAN; 1		MEM; 1	TEX; 1*	PHO; 2	HOM; 6	1st	5577
2007	Kevin Harvick	21	Chevy	DAY; 1			LVS; 4	ATL; 5					TAL; 10		DAR; 10						NHA; 1*	DAY; 2	CHI; 1			CGV; 1	GLN; 1*	MCH; 3								TEX; 1	PHO; 5	HOM; 16*	4th	4716
2007	Timothy Peters	21	Chevy		CAL; 17				BRI; 25	NSH; 32	TEX; 41	PHO; 13						NSH; 20	KEN; 17																				4th	4716
2007	P. J. Jones	21	Chevy			MXC; 24																																	4th	4716
2007	Scott Wimmer	21	Chevy											RCH; 10		CLT; 9	DOV; 3												BRI; 5				KAN; 15	CLT; 13					4th	4716
2007	Tim McCreadie	21	Chevy																	MLW; 28				GTY; 14	IRP; 12						RCH; 32	DOV; 24			MEM; 16				4th	4716
2007	Clint Bowyer	21	Chevy																											CAL; 5									4th	4716
2008	Bobby Labonte	21	Chevy	DAY; 15		LVS; 34	ATL; 5	BRI; 29		TEX; 4																													39th	1397
2008	Stephen Leicht	21	Chevy		CAL; 10				NSH; 12		PHO; 7	MXC	TAL; 34	RCH	DAR	CLT	DOV	NSH	KEN	MLW	NHA	DAY	CHI	GTY	IRP	CGV	GLN	MCH	BRI	CAL						TEX; 18	PHO		39th	1397
2008	Austin Dillon	21	Chevy																												RCH; 26	DOV	KAN	CLT	MEM; 4				39th	1397
2008	Scott Wimmer	21	Chevy																																			HOM; 6	39th	1397
2010	John Wes Townley	21	Chevy	DAY; 23	CAL; 30	LVS; 15	BRI; 26	NSH; 18	PHO; Wth^{†}																														22nd	3406
2010	Clint Bowyer	21	Chevy						PHO; 11	TEX; 35	TAL; 6	RCH; 23	DAR; 39	DOV; 25	CLT; 10					DAY; 6	CHI	GTY	IRP	IOW	GLN	MCH	BRI; 7	CGV	ATL; 14	RCH; 7	DOV	KAN	CAL	CLT; 5	GTY	TEX; 30	PHO	HOM	22nd	3406
2010	Scott Riggs	21	Chevy													NSH; 9	KEN; 9																						22nd	3406
2010	Tim George Jr.	21	Chevy															ROA; 32																					22nd	3406
2010	Austin Dillon	21	Chevy																NHA; 25																				22nd	3406
2011	Tim George Jr.	21	Chevy	DAY	PHO	LVS	BRI	CAL	TEX	TAL; 36	NSH	RCH	DAR	DOV	IOW	CLT	CHI	MCH	ROA	DAY; 21	KEN	NHA	NSH	IRP	IOW	GLN; 21	CGV; DNQ	BRI	ATL	RCH	CHI	DOV	KAN	CLT	TEX	PHO	HOM		55th	54
2012	Joey Coulter	21	Chevy	DAY	PHO	LVS	BRI	CAL	TEX	RCH	TAL	DAR	IOW	CLT; 10	DOV	MCH	ROA	KEN	DAY	NHA	CHI	IND	IOW	GLN	CGV	BRI	ATL	RCH	CHI	KEN	DOV	CLT	KAN	TEX	PHO	HOM; 14			51st	64
2013	Brendan Gaughan	21	Chevy	DAY	PHO	LVS; DNQ	BRI	CAL	TEX	RCH	TAL	DAR					ROA; 11	KEN	DAY	NHA						BRI; 15	ATL	RCH	CHI										39th	199
2013	Dakoda Armstrong	21	Chevy										CLT; 31	DOV	IOW	MCH					CHI; 15									KEN; 13	DOV	KAN; 19	CLT	TEX	PHO	HOM			39th	199
2013	Kevin Harvick	21	Chevy																			IND; 5	IOW	GLN	MOH														39th	199
2017	Daniel Hemric	21	Chevy	DAY; 31	ATL; 9	LVS; 13	PHO; 7	CAL; 11	TEX; 32	BRI; 5	RCH; 3	TAL; 38	CLT; 13	DOV; 13	POC; 9	MCH; 12	IOW; 21	DAY; 32	KEN; 9	NHA; 12	IND; 8	IOW; 7	GLN; 11	MOH; 2	BRI; 7	ROA; 15	DAR; 18	RCH; 4	CHI; 4	KEN; 7	DOV; 4	CLT; 7	KAN; 18	TEX; 14	PHO; 5	HOM; 34			8th	2231
2018	Daniel Hemric	21	Chevy	DAY; 26	ATL; 11	LVS; 6	PHO; 6	CAL; 5	TEX; 3	BRI; 3	RCH; 29	TAL; 23	DOV; 3	CLT; 7	POC; 3	MCH; 2	IOW; 3	CHI; 5	DAY; 8	KEN; 2	NHA; 11	IOW; 11	GLN; 16	MOH; 3	BRI; 24	ROA; 3	DAR; 11	IND; 5	LVS; 29	RCH; 3	CLT; 10	DOV; 7	KAN; 2*	TEX; 10	PHO; 2	HOM; 5			3rd	4033
2019	Kaz Grala	21	Chevy	DAY	ATL	LVS	PHO	CAL	TEX; 18	BRI	RCH; 14	TAL	DOV; 14	CLT	POC						NHA; 14	IOW	GLN	MOH	BRI	ROA; 5	DAR	IND	LVS										37th	175
2019	Joe Graf Jr.	21	Chevy													MCH; DNQ	IOW; 19	CHI	DAY; 23	KEN										RCH; 14	CLT	DOV	KAN	TEX	PHO	HOM			37th	175
2020	Myatt Snider	21	Chevy	DAY; 33	LVS; 16		PHO; 14		CLT; 10	BRI; 5					POC; 4																				MAR; 23	PHO; 18			11th	2185
2020	Anthony Alfredo	21	Chevy			CAL; 6		DAR; 14			ATL; 10	HOM; 4	HOM; 11	TAL; 6		IND; 20	KEN; 6	KEN; 6	TEX; 27				DOV; 11	DOV; 13	DAY; 21	DAR; 27			BRI; 6	LVS; 8	TAL; 12		KAN; 29	TEX; 3					11th	2185
2020	Kaz Grala	21	Chevy																	KAN; 13	ROA; 4						RCH; 9	RCH; 9				CLT; 31							11th	2185
2020	Earl Bamber	21	Chevy																			DAY; 33																	11th	2185
2022	Austin Hill	21	Chevy	DAY; 1	CAL; 27	LVS; 31	PHO; 17	ATL; 2	COA; 2	RCH; 18	MAR; 4	TAL; 27*	DOV; 14	DAR; 10	TEX; 5	CLT; 14	PIR; 3	NSH; 8	ROA; 4	ATL; 1*	NHA; 7	POC; 8	IND; 9	MCH; 5	GLN; 30	DAY; 14	DAR; 10	KAN; 12	BRI; 3	TEX; 2	TAL; 14*	ROV; 29	LVS; 6	HOM; 9	MAR; 10	PHO; 9			6th	2273
2023	Austin Hill	21	Chevy	DAY; 1	CAL; 6	LVS; 1	PHO; 7	ATL; 1*	COA; 37	RCH; 9	MAR; 17	TAL; 18	DOV; 4	DAR; 4	CLT; 4	PIR; 5	SON; 8	NSH; 4	CSC; 5	ATL; 12	NHA; 3	POC; 1	ROA; 3	MCH; 11	IRC; 4	GLN; 14	DAY; 23*	DAR; 2	KAN; 5	BRI; 33	TEX; 7	ROV; 9	LVS; 7	HOM; 4	MAR; 21	PHO; 7			5th	2273
2024	Austin Hill	21	Chevy	DAY; 1	ATL; 1	LVS; 4	PHO; 4	COA; 2	RCH; 8	MAR; 34	TEX; 6	TAL; 14*	DOV; 15	DAR; 2	CLT; 25	PIR; 11	SON; 5	IOW; 29	NHA; 24	NSH; 4	CSC; 7	POC; 7	IND; 6	MCH; 18	DAY; 31	DAR; 9	ATL; 1	GLN; 33	BRI; 13	KAN; 7	TAL; 23	ROV; 4	LVS; 10	HOM; 1*	MAR; 14	PHO; 6			4th	4027
2025	Austin Hill	21	Chevy	DAY; 33*	ATL; 1*	COA; 4	PHO; 37	LVS; 4	HOM; 3	MAR; 1	DAR; 16	BRI; 24	CAR; 6	TAL; 1	TEX; 4	CLT; 7	NSH; 7	MXC; 4	POC; 35	ATL; 26	CSC; 4	SON; 12	DOV; 13	IND; 34		GLN; 4	DAY; 25	PIR; 5	GTW; 12	BRI; 19	KAN; 3	ROV; 28	LVS; 10	TAL; 1*	MAR; 12	PHO; 9			4th	4028
2025	Austin Dillon	21	Chevy																						IOW; 14														4th	4028
2026	Austin Hill	21	Chevy	DAY; 1*	ATL; 12*	COA; 2	PHO; 12	LVS; 10	DAR; 35	MAR; 6	CAR; 11	BRI; 21	KAN; 34	TAL; 13	TEX; 7	GLN; 11	DOV; 5	CLT; 3	NSH; 11	POC; 14	COR; 1	SON; 22	CHI; 5	ATL; 22	IND; 10	IOW; 11	DAY; 2	DAR; 5	GTW; 29	BRI; 22	LVS; 9	CLT; 7	PHO; 15	TAL; 35	MAR; 31	HOM; 8			10th	2276

=== Car No. 29 history ===
Part-time (2002–2006)

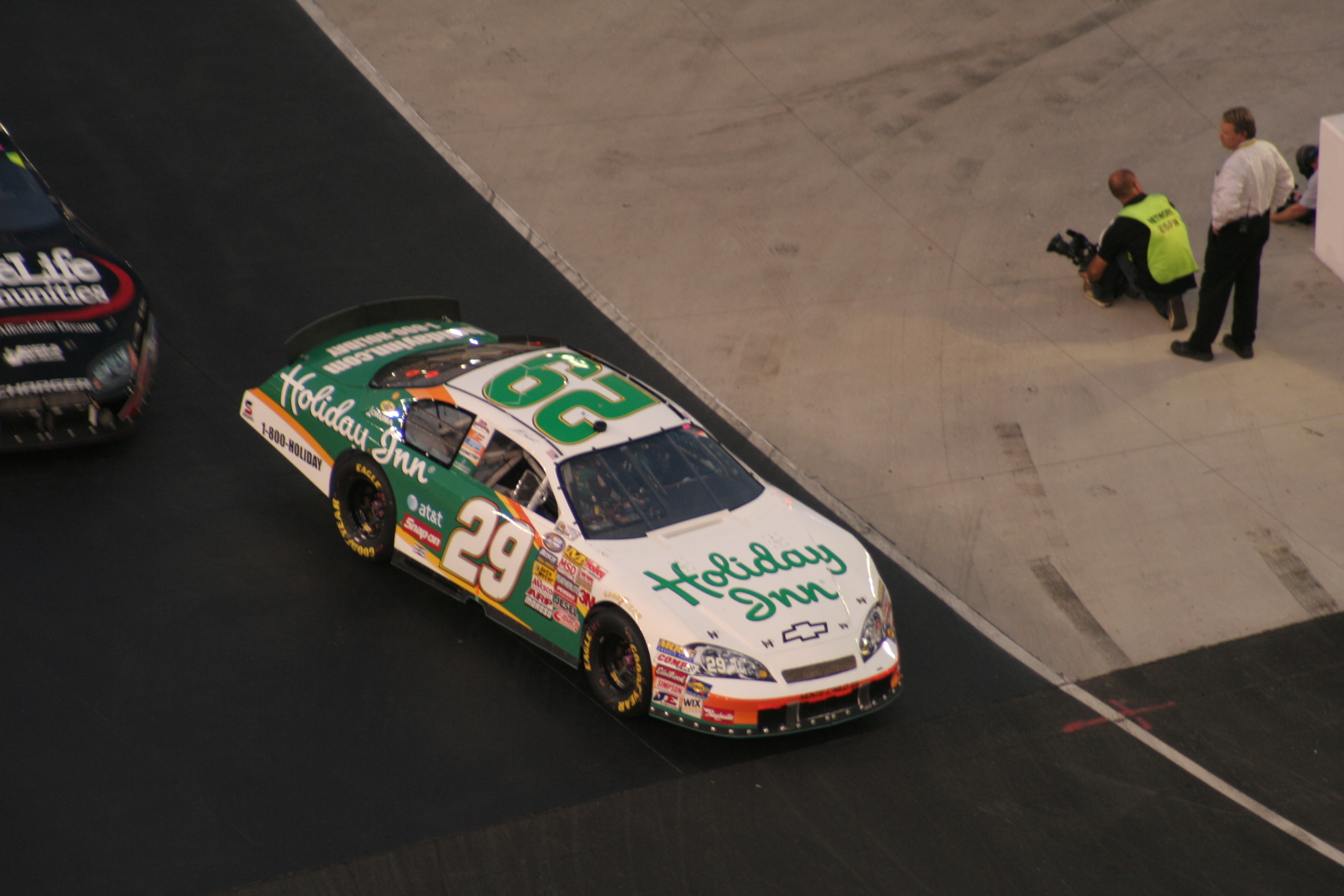
The No. 29 car in 2007.

The 29 car first appeared in 2002, with Kevin Harvick (driver of the 29 Cup Series car) running four races with sponsorship from GM Goodwrench, Action Racing Collectibles, Sonic, and Sylvania. Jim Sauter also made his final career start at the Milwaukee Mile with Rockwell Automation and Nilfisk-Advance sponsorship, racing as a teammate to his sons Jay and Johnny and against his other son Tim. The car appeared again in 2003 at Homestead–Miami Speedway with Johnny Sauter driving and the PayDay sponsorship, as a thank you from Richard Childress for Sauter's help in winning the 2003 owners' championship for the 21 team. In 2004 several drivers including Bobby Labonte, Tony Stewart, Ricky Craven, Brandon Miller and Kevin Harvick ran in the 29.

The 29 car returned in 2005 at Bristol Motor Speedway as part of a promotion for Reese's Chocolate and Peanut Butter Lovers Cups. The promotion involved the 29 painted as the Chocolate Lovers car and the 21 painted as the Peanut Butter Lovers car. The plan was for Jeff Burton to drive the 29 while Kevin Harvick would drive the 21. Qualifying was rained out, so the entries were switched to assure that both cars would make the field (Harvick was a past champion and the No. 29 was not locked in). Burton drove the 21 while Harvick drove the 29. Harvick won the race in this car with Burton finishing second in the 21. Later in the season, Mayflower Transit came on to sponsor Burton after a seven-year relationship with him.

On March 17, 2006, Holiday Inn announced its sponsorship of the 29 for ten races with Burton returning as its driver. The new car made its 2006 debut at Richmond. Burton finished in the top ten seven out of the ten times the car raced in 2006, including a win at Dover in June. Burton started 36th after qualifying was rained out, and passed Kurt Busch with eighteen laps to go.

Multiple Drivers (2007–2009)

In 2007, the No. 29 went full-time and, like the No. 21 several years before, Childress set out to win the owners' championship for a second time without a full-time driver. Burton and Scott Wimmer, who had just lost a Cup Series ride due to lack of sponsorship, shared the No. 29 with Holiday Inn sponsoring. Burton won five times including the finale at Homestead and Wimmer put together several strong finishes in his time in the car, and Childress had his second Busch Series owners' championship in which no full-time driver raced for the team.

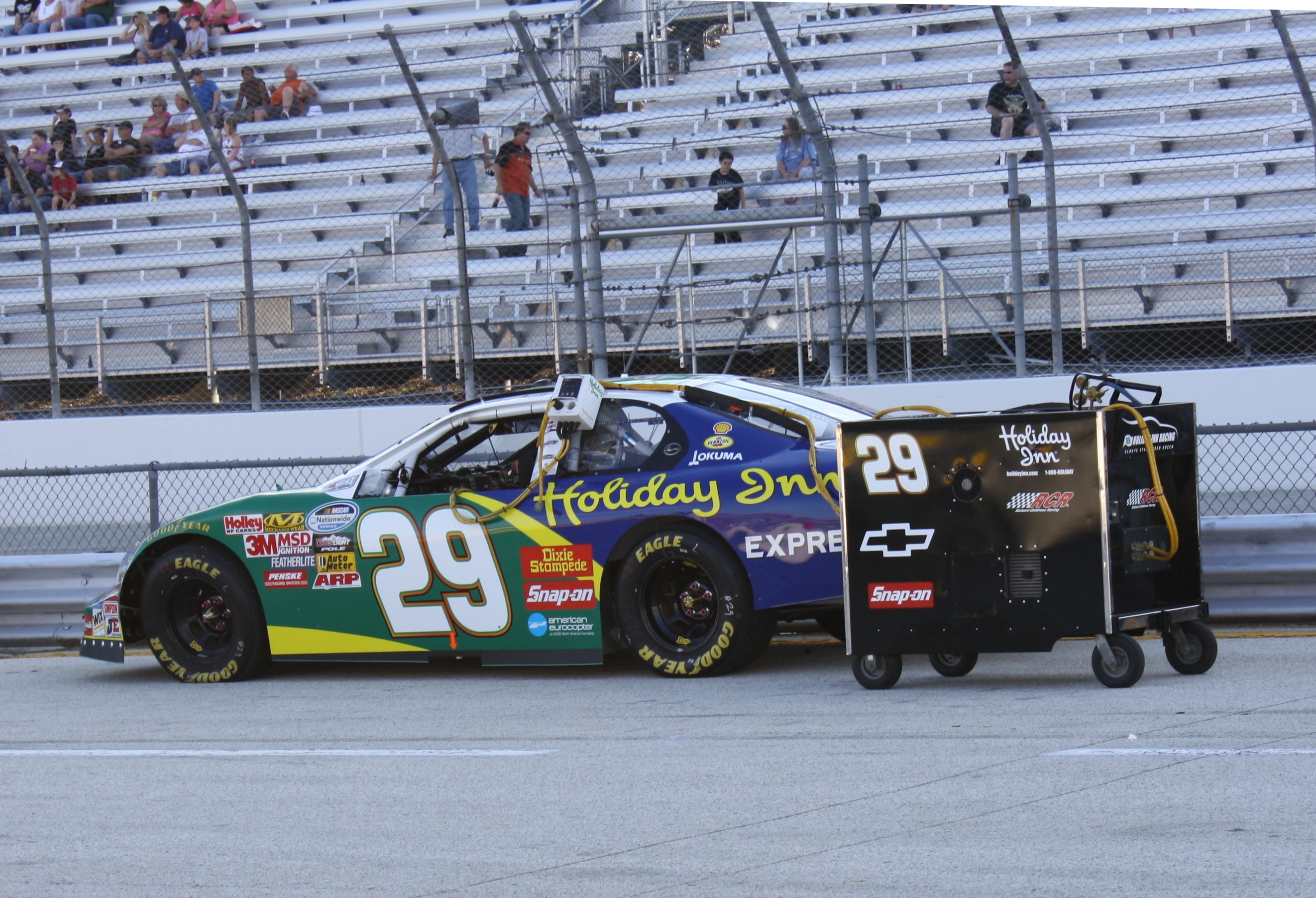
Stephen Leicht's car at Milwaukee in 2009.

Holiday Inn signed a multi-year extension near the end of 2007, with Scott Wimmer signing on for 23 races, and Burton filling out the rest. The new deal also brought on branding from Holiday Inn Express, which included commercials featuring Burton. Burton had two poles, but also had two DNFs and went winless in thirteen starts. Wimmer, meanwhile had a pole at Bristol and thirteen top-tens. This included a win at Nashville, where he went by teammate Clint Bowyer with 21 laps to go to take the victory. Wimmer left the team following the 2008 season.

The 2009 season saw a change in the driver lineup for the No. 29 team. Longtime driver Jeff Burton was joined by Cup teammate and 2008 Nationwide Series Champion Clint Bowyer, as well as up and comer Stephen Leicht. Bowyer's championship crew chief Dan Deeringhoff also moved from the No. 2 team over to the 29 for all three drivers. After seeing Burton's name on the window of the car during a photoshoot (Burton being the longest-tenured in the 29), the three drivers entered into a competition between each other: whoever could score the most wins in the seventeen races between February and July would have their name placed on the car for the remainder of the season, including the other drivers' appearances. Burton was set to drive seven events in the first half of the season, Bowyer in 6 events including the opener at Daytona International Speedway, and Leicht at four standalone events. The drivers did not have as much success as anticipated; Bowyer scored the team's only two wins (the second races at both Daytona and Dover), Burton had ten top-tens but only two top-fives, and Leicht had six top-tens in nine total starts with a best finish of sixth (twice). Burton also made his 300th career Nationwide Series start at Charlotte Motor Speedway in May. After 2009, RCR shut down the team after Holiday Inn pulled its sponsorship.

==== Car No. 29 results ====
Year	Driver	No.	Make	1	2	3	4	5	6	7	8	9	10	11	12	13	14	15	16	17	18	19	20	21	22	23	24	25	26	27	28	29	30	31	32	33	34	35	Owners	Pts
2002	Kevin Harvick	29	Chevy	DAY	CAR	LVS	DAR	BRI; 24	TEX; 6	NSH	TAL	CAL	RCH	NHA	NZH	CLT	DOV	NSH	KEN								BRI; 30	DAR	RCH	DOV	KAN	CLT	MEM	ATL	CAR	PHO; 37	HOM		53rd	452
2002	Jim Sauter	29	Chevy																	MLW; 29	DAY	CHI	GTY	PPR	IRP	MCH													53rd	452
2003	Mardy Lindley	29	Chevy	DAY	CAR	LVS	DAR	BRI	TEX	TAL	NSH	CAL	RCH	GTY	NZh	CLT	DOV	NSH	KEN	MLW	DAY	CHI	NHA	PPR	IRP; 16	MCH	BRI	DAR	RCH	DOV									58th	478
2003	Kevin Harvick	29	Chevy																												KAN; 2	CLT							58th	478
2003	Michael Lewis	29	Chevy																														MEM; 34	ATL	PHO	CAR			58th	478
2003	Johnny Sauter	29	Chevy																																		HOM; 12		58th	478
2004	Bobby Labonte	29	Chevy	DAY	CAR	LVS	DAR	BRI	TEX; 11	NSH	TAL																												50th	952
2004	Tony Stewart	29	Chevy									CAL; 2	GTY	RCH	NZH	CLT	DOV	NSH	KEN	MLW	DAY																		50th	952
2004	Ricky Craven	29	Chevy																			CHI; 11	NHA	PPR	IRP	MCH	BRI	CAL	RCH										50th	952
2004	Kerry Earnhardt	29	Chevy																											DOV; 23									50th	952
2004	Brandon Miller	29	Chevy																												KAN; 16	CLT	MEM						50th	952
2004	Kevin Harvick	29	Chevy																															ATL; 15	PHO	DAR	HOM; 1		50th	952
2005	Kevin Harvick	29	Chevy	DAY	CAL	MXC	LVS	ATL	NSH	BRI; 1	TEX	PHO	TAL	DAR	RCH	CLT	DOV	NSH	KEN	MLW	DAY	CHI	NHA	PPR	GTY	IRP	GLN	MCH	BRI										61st	300
2005	Jeff Burton	29	Chevy																											CAL; 16	RCH	DOV	KAN	CLT	MEM	TEX	PHO	HOM	61st	300
2006	Kevin Harvick	29	Chevy	DAY; 5	CAL	MXC	LVS	ATL	BRI	TEX	NSH	PHO	TAL																										38th	1573
2006	Jeff Burton	29	Chevy											RCH; 2	DAR	CLT; 6	DOV; 1	NSH	KEN	MLW	DAY	CHI; 3	NHA	MAR	GTY	IRP; 5	GLN	MCH; 10	BRI; 33	CAL	RCH; 40	DOV	KAN; 40	CLT		TEX; 3	PHO	HOM	38th	1573
2006	Timothy Peters	29	Chevy																																MEM; 13				38th	1573
2007	Scott Wimmer	29	Chevy	DAY; 13		MXC; 30			BRI; 9	NSH; 7			TAL; 34					NSH; 4	KEN; 3	MLW; 2	NHA; 11	DAY; 31		GTY; 2	IRP; 7						RCH; 8	DOV; 29			MEM; 6		PHO; 4		1st	5108
2007	Jeff Burton	29	Chevy		CAL; 7		LVS; 1	ATL; 1			TEX; 10	PHO; 3		RCH; 3*	DAR; 4	CLT; 4	DOV; 19						CHI; 3			CGV; 10	GLN; 2	MCH; 4	BRI; 40	CAL; 1			KAN; 8	CLT; 1*		TEX; 8		HOM; 1	1st	5108
2008	Scott Wimmer	29	Chevy	DAY; 18				BRI; 12	NSH; 1			MXC; 7	TAL; 9	RCH; 10			DOV; 12	NSH; 7	KEN; 2	MLW; 6	NHA; 12	DAY; 7		GTY; 30	IRP; 4	CGV; 11		MCH; 22	BRI; 6		RCH; 2	DOV; 4			MEM; 22	TEX; 13	PHO; 19		5th	4714
2008	Jeff Burton	29	Chevy		CAL; 8	LVS; 24	ATL; 3			TEX; 2	PHO; 31				DAR; 21	CLT; 8							CHI; 8				GLN; 14			CAL; 4			KAN; 14	CLT; 2				HOM; 35	5th	4714
2009	Clint Bowyer	29	Chevy	DAY; 3			BRI; 3				TAL; 31				DOV; 3				NHA; 14	DAY; 1							BRI; 7			RCH; 11	DOV; 1	KAN; 9	CAL; 26				PHO; 4		5th	4880
2009	Jeff Burton	29	Chevy		CAL; 6	LVS; 10		TEX; 8		PHO; 20		RCH; 31	DAR; 8	CLT; 9							CHI; 11				GLN; 6	MCH; 9			ATL; 5					CLT; 9				HOM; 3	5th	4880
2009	Stephen Leicht	29	Chevy						NSH; 11							NSH; 6	KEN; 31	MLW; 8				GTY; 6	IRP; 13	IOW; 10				CGV; 8							MEM; 9				5th	4880
2009	Casey Mears	29	Chevy																																	TEX; 2			5th	4880

=== Car No. 33 history ===
Multiple Drivers (2012–2015)

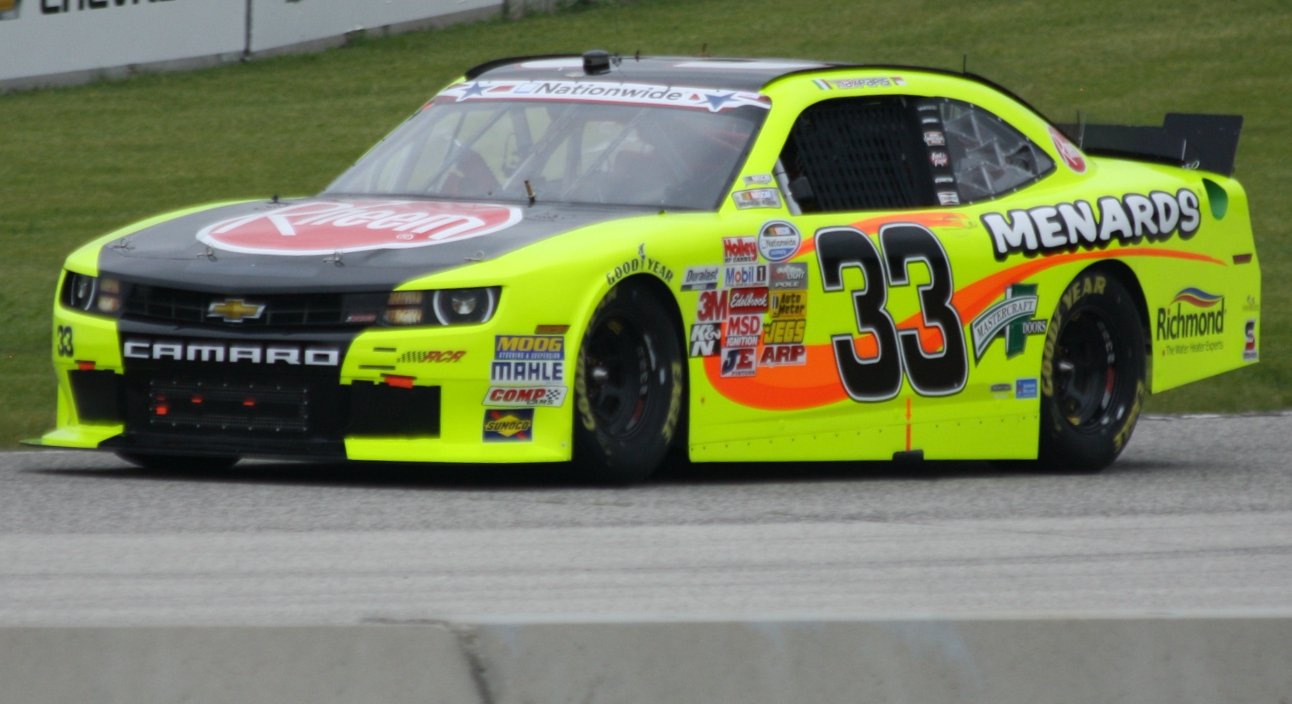
Max Papis at Road America in 2013.

In 2012, the No. 33 car was transferred to RCR to run for the owner's championship. 2011 champion Tony Stewart drove the No. 33 with sponsorship from Nabisco's Oreo and Ritz brands at the season opener in Daytona. Kevin Harvick ran 13 races with South Point, Pinnacle Foods, Hunt Brothers Pizza and AdvancePierre Foods sponsoring, Brendan Gaughan drove for ten races with South Point sponsoring, Menard ran for seven races, and Max Papis drove at Road America, both with sponsorship from Menards and Rheem. Harvick would be the only driver to win in the No. 33, winning at Richmond and Texas.

The No. 33 car returned in 2013 mainly driven by Harvick and Ty Dillon. Tony Stewart would take the No. 33 team to victory lane at the season opener at Daytona, which was marred by a last lap incident. The No. 33 team would take its second and last win of the season with Harvick at Atlanta. Dakoda Armstrong ran Fontana with sponsorship from WinField. Paul Menard, Max Papis, Truck series driver Matt Crafton, and Ryan Gifford all took turns driving the car with MENARDS sponsorship.

In 2014, Menard returned to the car for a few races, scoring a win at Michigan. Rookie Cale Conley drove several races with OKUMA and Iraq and Afghanistan Veterans of America sponsoring.

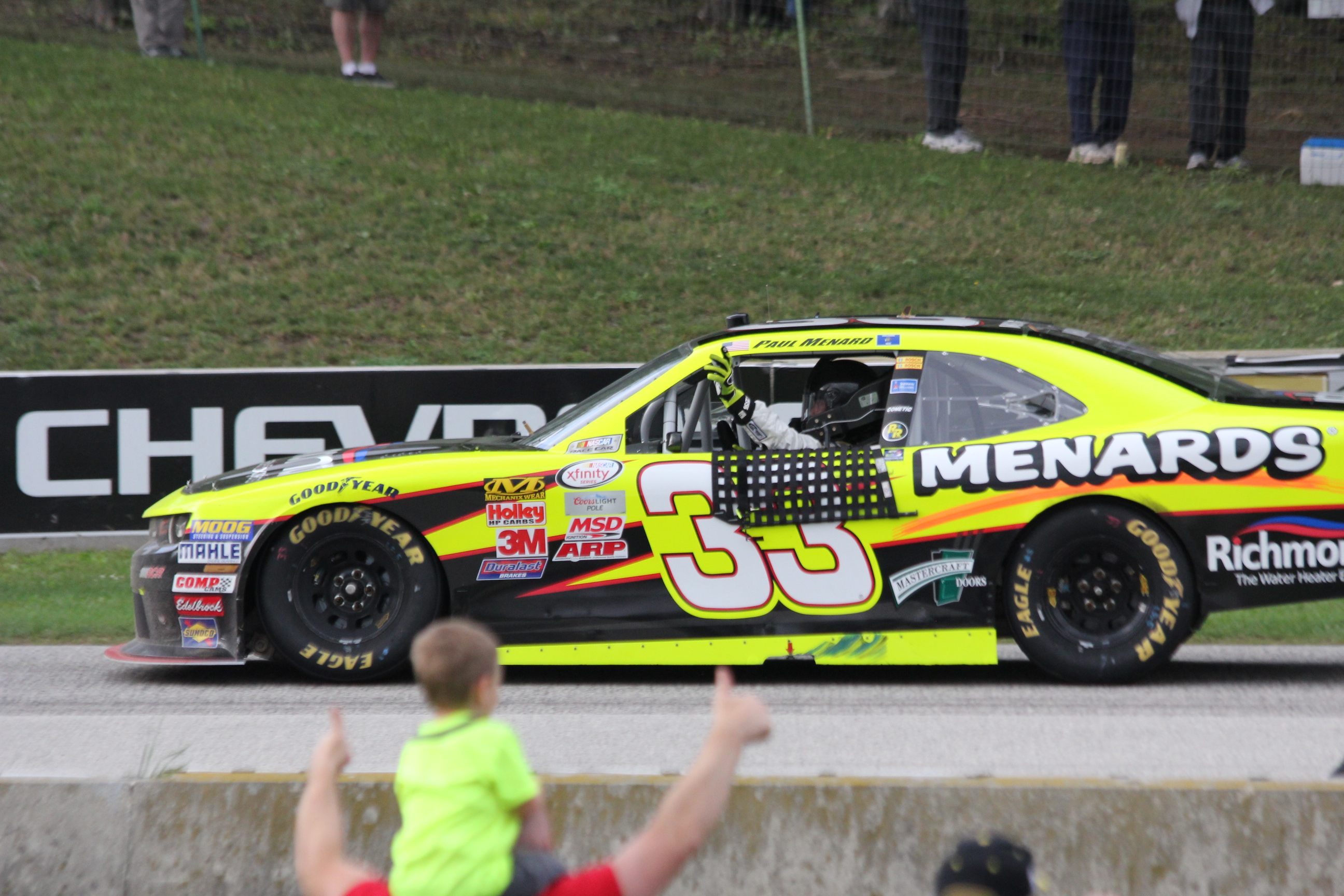
Paul Menard after winning at Road America in 2015.

For 2015, Austin Dillon, Menard, and Brandon Jones shared the ride with sponsorship from Rheem and Menards. Menard scored a win in August at Road America in his native Wisconsin, taking the lead on pit strategy and holding off Ryan Blaney.

Brandon Jones (2016–2017)

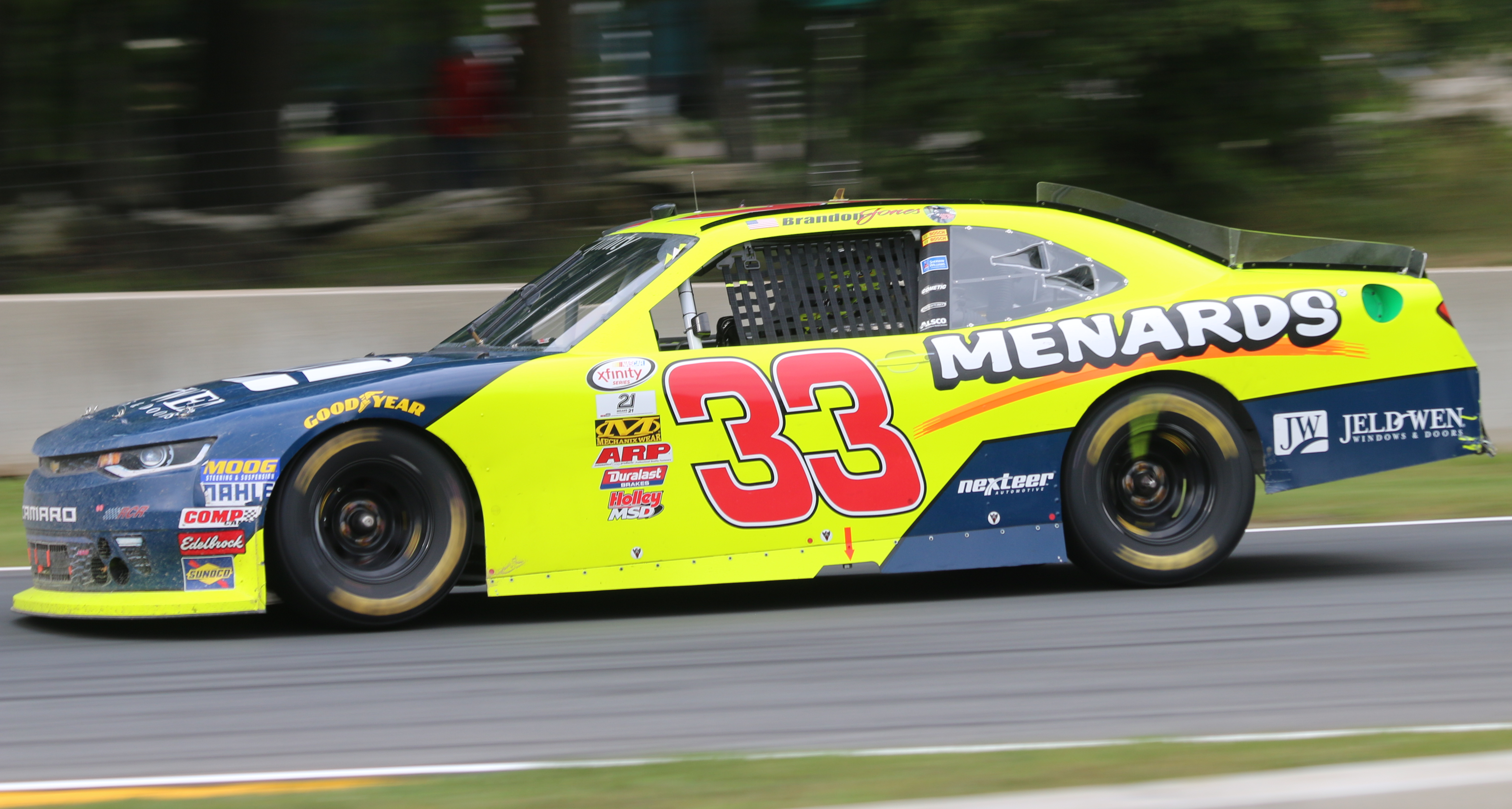
Brandon Jones at Road America in 2017

For 2016, Brandon Jones will run full-time, competing for Rookie of the Year. Menards and Nexteer Automotive will sponsor the effort. Mike Hillman Jr. was named the crew chief for the team. In his first season with the team he would finish 10th in points with 13 top tens, however he regressed in 2017 missing the chase and scoring only 3 top tens to finish 16th in points.

On November 17, 2017, it was announced that RCR is downsizing to three teams in 2018, shutting down the 33 and 62 team after the 2017 season.

Part-time (2024–present)

On May 20, 2024, it was announced that RCR would enter the No. 33 for Kyle Busch at Charlotte. He would finish 6th.

On January 24, 2025, RCR announced Kasey Kahne would make his NASCAR return, after a seven-year absence, at Rockingham in April 2025.

On March 4, 2026, it was announced that Garrett Mitchell would drive three races in the No. 33, starting at Rockingham Speedway in April. At Rockingham, he finished 32nd. Mitchell planned to run the Spring Talladega race, but was not approved due to lack of experience in NASCAR. He ran at Nashville where he finished 35th.

==== Car No. 33 results ====
Year	Driver	No.	Make	1	2	3	4	5	6	7	8	9	10	11	12	13	14	15	16	17	18	19	20	21	22	23	24	25	26	27	28	29	30	31	32	33	Owners	Pts
2012	Tony Stewart	33	Chevy	DAY; 8																																	5th	1182
2012	Kevin Harvick	33	Chevy		PHO; 5*		BRI; 9			RCH; 3*	TAL; 22			CLT; 4*				KEN; 3	DAY; 28	NHA; 2						BRI; 15*	ATL; 3*	RCH; 1*				CLT; 2		TEX; 1*			5th	1182
2012	Brendan Gaughan	33	Chevy			LVS; 5		CAL; 10				DAR; 26	IOW; 10								CHI; 28		IOW; 14		CGV; 11					KEN; 3					PHO; 26	HOM; 3	5th	1182
2012	Paul Menard	33	Chevy						TEX; 2*							MCH; 8						IND; 8		GLN; 8					CHI; 5		DOV; 2		KAN; 16*				5th	1182
2012	Ty Dillon	33	Chevy												DOV; 7																						5th	1182
2012	Max Papis	33	Chevy														ROA; 4																				5th	1182
2013	Tony Stewart	33	Chevy	DAY; 1																																	6th	1097
2013	Kevin Harvick	33	Chevy		PHO; 33		BRI; 5		TEX; 5	RCH; 2*			CLT; 5									IND; 5					ATL; 1*		CHI; 9		DOV; 3		CLT; 4		PHO; 9		6th	1097
2013	Ty Dillon	33	Chevy			LVS; 11					TAL; 24	DAR; 13		DOV; 23					DAY; 27							BRI; 7		RCH; 16						TEX; 12		HOM; 14	6th	1097
2013	Dakoda Armstrong	33	Chevy					CAL; 15																													6th	1097
2013	Max Papis	33	Chevy												IOW; 31		ROA; 17								MOH; 4												6th	1097
2013	Paul Menard	33	Chevy													MCH; 3				NHA; 32		IND; 6										KAN; 2					6th	1097
2013	Matt Crafton	33	Chevy															KEN; 3			CHI; 10									KEN; 3							6th	1097
2013	Ryan Gifford	33	Chevy																				IOW; 9														6th	1097
2013	Brendan Gaughan	33	Chevy																					GLN; 14													6th	1097
2014	Matt Crafton	33	Chevy	DAY	PHO	LVS; 12																																
2014	Cale Conley	33	Chevy				BRI; 11	CAL	TEX	DAR; 32	RCH; 17	TAL	IOW; 30	CLT	DOV; 31						CHI; 12					BRI; 15	ATL	RCH; 17		KEN; 6	DOV; 11		CLT; 33					
2014	Paul Menard	33	Chevy													MCH; 1	ROA	KEN; 4	DAY	NHA; 19		IND; 6	IOW	GLN; 9	MOH				CHI; 11			KAN; 4				HOM; 12		
2014	Austin Dillon	33	Chevy																															TEX; 7	PHO			
2015	Austin Dillon	33	Chevy	DAY; 4		LVS; 1*	PHO; 4	CAL; 38	TEX; 5	BRI; 16	RCH; 8	TAL; 3		CLT; 1*	DOV; 4		CHI; 3	DAY; 1		NHA; 2								RCH; 9			DOV; 7	CLT; 1	KAN; 16	TEX; 3	PHO; 14	HOM; 2	4th	1187
2015	Paul Menard	33	Chevy		ATL; 6											MCH; 18			KEN; 6		IND; 4		GLN; 9			ROA; 1	DAR; 25		CHI; 4								4th	1187
2015	Brandon Jones	33	Chevy										IOW; 8									IOW; 20		MOH; 29	BRI; 13					KEN; 5							4th	1187
2016	Brandon Jones	33	Chevy	DAY; 7	ATL; 11	LVS; 6	PHO; 11	CAL; 9	TEX; 9	BRI; 11	RCH; 15	TAL; 18*	DOV; 25	CLT; 7	POC; 8	MCH; 10	IOW; 12	DAY; 29	KEN; 11	NHA; 11	IND; 10	IOW; 16	GLN; 13	MOH; 19	BRI; 9	ROA; 16	DAR; 9	RCH; 23	CHI; 10	KEN; 26	DOV; 17	CLT; 16	KAN; 8	TEX; 19	PHO; 18	HOM; 15	13th	901
2017	Brandon Jones	33	Chevy	DAY; 28	ATL; 14	LVS; 15	PHO; 15	CAL; 32	TEX; 15	BRI; 20	RCH; 33	TAL; 37	CLT; 16	DOV; 29	POC; 36	MCH; 9	IOW; 23	DAY; 19	KEN; 40	NHA; 34	IND; 9	IOW; 10	GLN; 14	MOH; 14	BRI; 20	ROA; 25	DAR; 23	RCH; 23	CHI; 12	KEN; 13	DOV; 39	CLT; 13	KAN; 11	TEX; 35	PHO; 15	HOM; 14	21st	549
2024	Kyle Busch	33	Chevy	DAY	ATL	LVS	PHO	COA	RCH	MAR	TEX	TAL	DOV	DAR	CLT; 6	PIR	SON	IOW	NHA	NSH	CSC	POC	IND	MCH	DAY	DAR	ATL	GLN	BRI	KAN	TAL	ROV	LVS	HOM	MAR	PHO		
2025	Kasey Kahne	33	Chevy	DAY	ATL	COA	PHO	LVS	HOM	MAR	DAR	BRI	CAR; 14	TAL	TEX	CLT	NSH	MXC	POC	ATL	CSC	SON	DOV	IND	IOW	GLN	DAY	PIR	GTW	BRI	KAN	ROV	LVS	TAL	MAR	PHO	44th	23
2026	Garrett Mitchell	33	Chevy	DAY	ATL	COA	PHO	LVS	DAR	MAR	CAR; 32	BRI	KAN	TAL	TEX	GLN	DOV	CLT	NSH; 35	POC	COR	SON	CHI	ATL	IND	IOW	DAY	DAR	GTW	BRI	LVS	CLT	PHO	TAL	MAR	HOM	49th	7

=== Car No. 62 history ===
Brendan Gaughan (2014–2017)

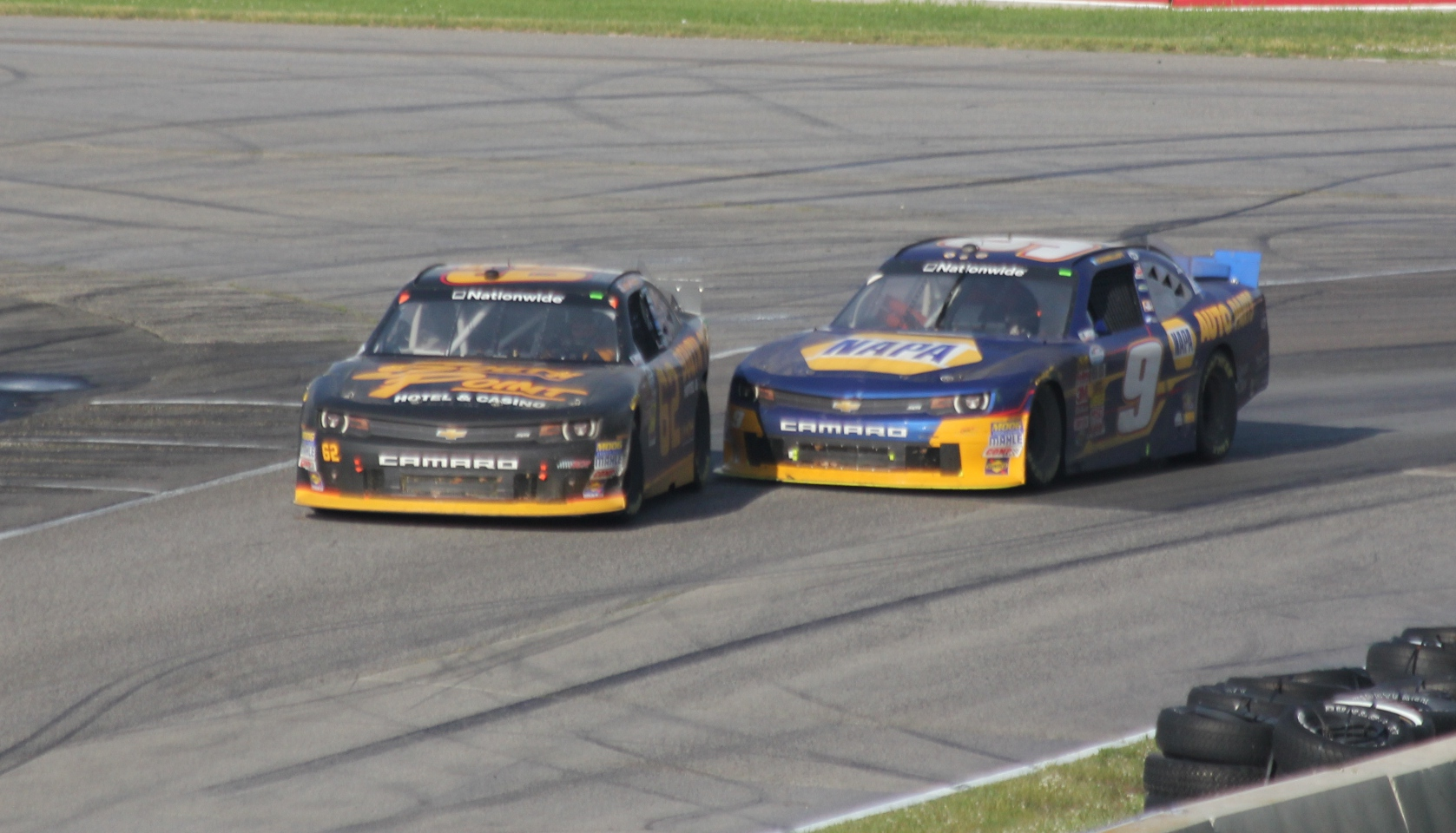
Brendan Gaughan's winning car at Road America in 2014.

In 2014, Brendan Gaughan and crew chief Shane Wilson moved up from the Truck Series to the Nationwide Series, bringing family-owned South Point Hotel, Casino & Spa and longtime number 62 with him. The team used the owners' points of the No. 33 team from 2013; the No. 33 scaled back to part-time. Gaughan scored his first career Nationwide win at Road America in June, after struggling early and sliding off the track on several occasions, but gaining an advantage as downpours forced the competitors to switch to treaded rain tires. When pole-sitter Alex Tagliani ran out of fuel before a Green-White-Checkered finish, Gaughan assumed the lead and fended off Chase Elliott and a hard-charging Tagliani (on fresh slick tires). Brendan dedicated the win to his late grandfather Jackie Gaughan. Gaughan scored his second win of the season at Kentucky in September, passing teammate Ty Dillon on the final restart. Gaughan scored a total of seven top tens to finish eighth in points.

Gaughan and South Point returned for 2015. At Richmond in May, two pit crew members from the 62 team were injured in a fire when fuel from a malfunctioning gas can ignited. The next week, Gaughan was involved in a crash at Talladega that sent the 62 car spinning down pit road, injuring two crew members from Biagi-DenBeste Racing. Gaughan's best finish of the season was a runner up at California.

Gaughan returned for 2016. Gaughan did not get back to victory lane in 2016 but scored four top-fives and sixteen top-tens throughout the season including a second place at Road America (the site of his first win).

Brendan Gaughan and South Point returned for the 2017 season, but he failed to score a victory after running solidly all year. However, on November 17, 2017, it was announced that RCR is downsizing to three teams in 2018, shutting down the 33 and 62 teams after the 2017 season.

==== Car No. 62 results ====
Year	Driver	No.	Make	1	2	3	4	5	6	7	8	9	10	11	12	13	14	15	16	17	18	19	20	21	22	23	24	25	26	27	28	29	30	31	32	33	Owners	Pts
2014	Brendan Gaughan	62	Chevy	DAY; 6	PHO; 16	LVS; 16	BRI; 7	CAL; 15	TEX; 11	DAR; 22	RCH; 20	TAL; 34	IOW; 12	CLT; 17	DOV; 12	MCH; 22	ROA; 1	KEN; 6	DAY; 28	NHA; 16	CHI; 11	IND; 19	IOW; 11	GLN; 28	MOH; 20	BRI; 6	ATL; 14	RCH; 18	CHI; 13	KEN; 1	DOV; 28	KAN; 13	CLT; 16	TEX; 16	PHO; 8	HOM; 29	13th	954
2015	Brendan Gaughan	62	Chevy	DAY; 29	ATL; 12	LVS; 6	PHO; 8	CAL; 2	TEX; 33	BRI; 9	RCH; 11	TAL; 39	IOW; 10	CLT; 18	DOV; 7	MCH; 12	CHI; 4	DAY; 25	KEN; 9	NHA; 11	IND; 13	IOW; 5	GLN; 10	MOH; 12	BRI; 10	ROA; 16	DAR; 13	RCH; 16	CHI; 10	KEN; 6	DOV; 16	CLT; 15	KAN; 10	TEX; 12	PHO; 12	HOM; 23	14th	1012
2016	Brendan Gaughan	62	Chevy	DAY; 10	ATL; 13	LVS; 10	PHO; 13	CAL; 7	TEX; 12	BRI; 16	RCH; 7	TAL; 5	DOV; 15	CLT; 10	POC; 14	MCH; 18	IOW; 15	DAY; 5	KEN; 13	NHA; 9	IND; 16	IOW; 11	GLN; 8	MOH; 8	BRI; 5	ROA; 2	DAR; 16	RCH; 18	CHI; 8	KEN; 6	DOV; 9	CLT; 13	KAN; 31	TEX; 15	PHO; 35	HOM; 8	12th	2161
2017	Brendan Gaughan	62	Chevy	DAY; 5	ATL; 13	LVS; 35	PHO; 27	CAL; 33	TEX; 19	BRI; 35	RCH; 35	TAL; 30	CLT; 9	DOV; 20	POC; 6	MCH; 14	IOW; 26	DAY; 9	KEN; 39	NHA; 17	IND; 13	IOW; 13	GLN; 9	MOH; 7	BRI; 30	ROA; 5	DAR; 13	RCH; 21	CHI; 13	KEN; 14	DOV; 10	CLT; 11	KAN; 13	TEX; 17	PHO; 32	HOM; 13	17th	685
