= Pacific Century Motors =

- Founded: November 2010
- Founder: E-town; Tempo Group
- Key people: Zhao Guangyi, Chairman
- Parent: AVIC Automobile Industry Holding
- Subsidiaries: Nexteer Automotive

Pacific Century Motors is a Chinese company formed to buy and hold Nexteer Automotive.

Originally, Pacific Century was a subsidiary of E-town, the Beijing municipal government's investment company, and Tempo Group, a Chinese car component manufacturer. Nexteer Automotive was acquired by Pacific Century Motors on November 30, 2010. Pacific Century also announce that they would be making additional acquisition in the next year or so. In March 2011, AVIC Automobile Industry Holding Co., a Chinese state-owned parts manufacturer, purchased a 51 percent interest in Pacific Century Motors.
