= Nexteer Automotive =

American power steering manufacturer

- Type: Public
- Industry: Automotive
- Predecessor: Delphi Steering
- Founded: 2009
- Founder: GM
- Headquarters: 1272 Doris Rd, Auburn Hills, Michigan, United States
- Number of locations: 44
- Area served: Worldwide
- Key people: Zili Lei (CEO); Robin Milavec(President, CTO, CSO); Mike Bierlein (VP, CFO); Hervé Boyer (VP, Global COO and NA Division President)
- Products: Power steering systems, Steering Columns, Driveline
- Revenue: ▲$3,839.7 million (2022)
- Operating income: ▼$86.6 million (2022)
- Net income: ▼$58.0 million (2022)
- Total assets: ▲$3.34 billion (2022)
- Total equity: ▼$1.98 billion (2022)
- Number of employees: ▲12,600 (Q4 2022)
- Parent: Pacific Century Motors(15%)
- Website: https://www.nexteer.com/

Nexteer Automotive (SEHK: 1316) is an American motion control technology company. It is a publicly traded company owned about one-third by its public shareholders. About 44% is owned by Nexteer Automotive (Hong Kong) Holdings Limited, and about 19% by Beijing E-Town International Automotive Investment & Management Co., Ltd. Nexteer's global headquarters is in Auburn Hills, Michigan, United States.

Nexteer Automotive is a major supplier in the automotive industry, specializing in the production of electric and hydraulic power steering systems, steer-by-wire systems, steering columns, intermediate shafts, driveline systems, and software for original equipment manufacturers (OEMs). The company operates 26 manufacturing plants, four technical and software centers. The company also has 13 customer service centers across North and South America, Europe, Asia, and Africa. Its customer base includes over 60 OEMs, encompassing well-known brands such as BMW, Ford, General Motors, Toyota, and Volkswagen, as well as domestic automakers in India, China, and South America.

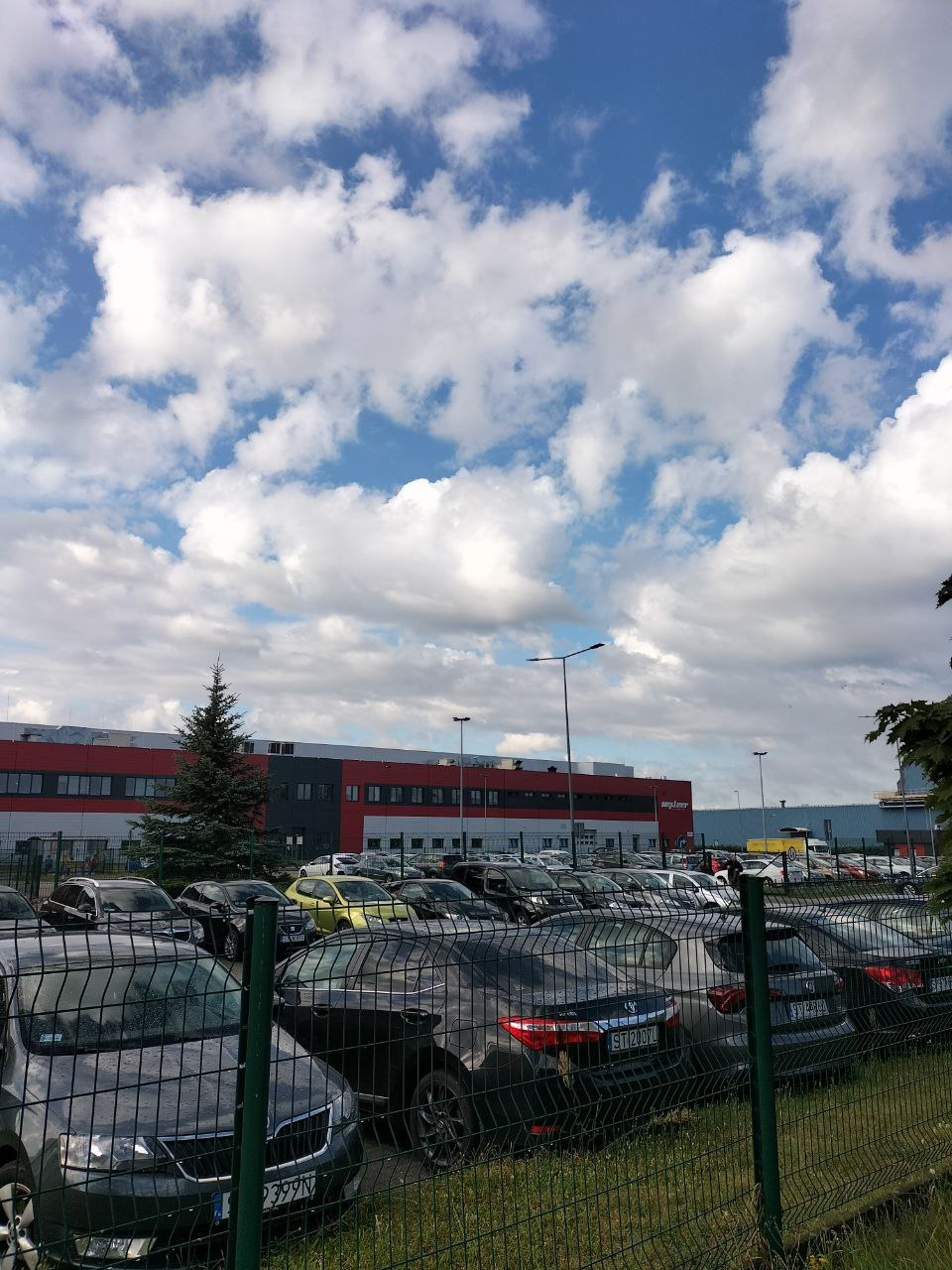

== History ==
Nexteer's original predecessor was founded in 1906 in Saginaw, Michigan, USA under the name Jackson, Wilcox and Church. Their product was named the Jacox gear. In 1909, the unit was purchased by Buick and then was transferred to parent company General Motors as the Jackson, Church and Wilcox Division. The division was renamed Saginaw Product Company in 1919 and Saginaw Steering Gear Division in 1928. The trade name of Jacox was changed to Saginaw in 1930. In 1985, the name was changed from Saginaw Steering Gear Division to Saginaw Division. The Saginaw Division was later grouped with other GM component units into Automotive Components Group, before becoming Delphi Automotive Systems in 1995. In 1999, Delphi Automotive became an independent company. Saginaw Division was renamed Delphi Steering.

=== Nexteer ===
With Delphi entering a lengthy bankruptcy proceeding, GM purchased Delphi Steering through their subsidiary, GM Global Steering Holdings LLC, in 2009 and renamed the company, Nexteer Automotive. GM moved to have the union change their contract with Nexteer in order to prepare the company for a sale as Nexteer had multiple customers besides GM. After the first offered agreement, GM warned the employees that this may hamper finding a buyer; the results being that GM may just shut Nexteer down. A second agreement was ratified by the union. The Michigan Economic Growth Authority gave a $70.7 million state tax credit over ten years to Nexteer in November 2009. Nexteer announced that same month investment plans totaling $400 million across the board and keeping its headquarters in Buena Vista Township. The Township responded with a 100 percent 20 year tax abatement. Nexteer was acquired by Pacific Century Motors on November 29, 2010. After the purchase, Nexteer was split into two separate companies.

Nexteer originally was going to go public on the Hong Kong Stock Exchange in June 2013, but the IPO was delayed until October 2013.

The company relocated its headquarters to Auburn Hills, Michigan in 2015.

== Technology ==
=== History ===
Technology History of Nexteer Automotive
Year / Period	Technological Milestones & Achievements
1906	Manual Steering
1951	Hydraulic Assisted Steering
1960s	Tilt-Wheel Steering Columns, Front-Wheel Drive Halfshafts, Energy-Absorbing Column
1970s	Air Bag Column, First Rack and Pinion Gear
1980s	Global Engineering
1995	Speed Variable Assist, Electric Power Steering
1999	Power Tilt Telescope Column, Quadrasteer
2004	Active Energy-Absorbing Column, Tri-Glide Halfshaft Joint
2009	Single Pinion Electric Power Steering
2010	World’s first 12-Volt Electric Power Steering Systems
2011	Full Size Truck Rack Electric Power Steering and CrossGlide Joint
2013	Magnetic Torque Overlay
2017	CNXMotion, a joint venture between Nexteer & Continental
2018	Advanced Steering Technology Suite, including Steer-by-Wire
2022	Dissolving of joint venture Dongfeng Nexteer
2023	Dissolving of CNXMotion and eDrive product line

=== Products ===
- Steering Systems: active steering, electric power steering, hydraulic power steering and torque overlay
  - Electric Power Steering: Since 1999, Nexteer Automotive has put more than 70 million EPS units on the road.
- Steering Components: columns; electronics, modules & sub-assemblies; intermediate shafts.
- Driveline Products: front-wheel drive halfshafts, rear-wheel drive halfshafts, intermediate drive shafts, propeller shaft joints, advanced technology.
- Assisted & Automated Driving Enablers
