= 2023 Ag-Pro 300 =

9th race of the 2023 NASCAR Xfinity Series

Race details
- Race 9 of 33 of the 2023 NASCAR Xfinity Series
- Date: April 22, 2023
- Official name: 32nd Annual Ag-Pro 300
- Location: Talladega Superspeedway, Lincoln, Alabama
- Course: Permanent racing facility
- Course length: 2.66 miles (4.28 km)
- Distance: 121 laps, 321 mi (516 km)
- Scheduled distance: 113 laps, 300 mi (483 km)
- Average speed: 106.960 mph (172.135 km/h)

Pole position
Driver	Austin Hill	Richard Childress Racing
- Time: 52.483

Most laps led
Driver	Brett Moffitt	AM Racing
- Laps: 20

Winner
No. 27	Jeb Burton	Jordan Anderson Racing

Television in the United States
- Network: FS1
- Announcers: Adam Alexander, Joey Logano, and Brad Keselowski

Radio in the United States
- Radio: MRN

The 2023 Ag-Pro 300 was the 9th stock car race of the 2023 NASCAR Xfinity Series, and the 32nd iteration of the event. The race was held on Saturday, April 22, 2023, in Lincoln, Alabama at Talladega Superspeedway, a 2.66 miles (4.28 km) permanent tri-oval shaped superspeedway. The race was increased from 113 to 121 laps, due to multiple NASCAR overtime finishes. In a chaotic and caution-filled race, Jeb Burton, driving for Jordan Anderson Racing, would hold off Sheldon Creed and the rest of the field on the final lap, and earned his 2nd career NASCAR Xfinity Series win, and his first of the season. This was also the first NASCAR win for Jordan Anderson Racing. To fill out the podium, Creed, driving for Richard Childress Racing, and Parker Kligerman, driving for Big Machine Racing, would finish 2nd and 3rd, respectively.

This was also the third race of the Dash 4 Cash. Drivers eligible for the Dash 4 Cash were Cole Custer, Josh Berry, Sammy Smith, and John Hunter Nemechek, after they were the highest finishing Xfinity regulars following the race at Martinsville. Custer, who finished 4th and was the only driver from the D4C to finish the race, would claim the bonus cash.

== Background ==
Talladega Superspeedway, formerly known as Alabama International Motor Speedway, is a motorsports complex located north of Talladega, Alabama. It is located on the former Anniston Air Force Base in the small city of Lincoln. A tri-oval, the track was constructed in 1969 by the International Speedway Corporation, a business controlled by the France family. Talladega is most known for its steep banking. The track currently hosts NASCAR's Cup Series, Xfinity Series and Craftsman Truck Series. Talladega is the longest NASCAR oval with a length of 2.66-mile-long (4.28 km) tri-oval like the Daytona International Speedway, which is 2.5-mile-long (4.0 km).

=== Entry list ===
- (R) denotes rookie driver.

#	Driver	Team	Make
00	Cole Custer	Stewart-Haas Racing	Ford
1	Sam Mayer	JR Motorsports	Chevrolet
02	Blaine Perkins	Our Motorsports	Chevrolet
2	Sheldon Creed	Richard Childress Racing	Chevrolet
4	Garrett Smithley	JD Motorsports	Chevrolet
5	Jade Buford	Big Machine Racing	Chevrolet
6	Brennan Poole	JD Motorsports	Chevrolet
07	David Starr	SS-Green Light Racing	Chevrolet
7	Justin Allgaier	JR Motorsports	Chevrolet
08	Gray Gaulding	SS-Green Light Racing	Chevrolet
8	Josh Berry	JR Motorsports	Chevrolet
9	Brandon Jones	JR Motorsports	Chevrolet
10	Derek Kraus	Kaulig Racing	Chevrolet
11	Daniel Hemric	Kaulig Racing	Chevrolet
13	Jason White	MBM Motorsports	Ford
16	Chandler Smith (R)	Kaulig Racing	Chevrolet
18	Sammy Smith (R)	Joe Gibbs Racing	Toyota
19	Ryan Truex	Joe Gibbs Racing	Toyota
20	John Hunter Nemechek	Joe Gibbs Racing	Toyota
21	Austin Hill	Richard Childress Racing	Chevrolet
24	Parker Chase	Sam Hunt Racing	Toyota
25	Brett Moffitt	AM Racing	Ford
26	Kaz Grala	Sam Hunt Racing	Toyota
27	Jeb Burton	Jordan Anderson Racing	Chevrolet
28	Kyle Sieg	RSS Racing	Ford
31	Parker Retzlaff (R)	Jordan Anderson Racing	Chevrolet
34	Jesse Iwuji	Jesse Iwuji Motorsports	Chevrolet
35	Joey Gase	Emerling-Gase Motorsports	Ford
38	Joe Graf Jr.	RSS Racing	Ford
39	Ryan Sieg	RSS Racing	Ford
43	Caesar Bacarella	Alpha Prime Racing	Chevrolet
44	Jeffrey Earnhardt	Alpha Prime Racing	Chevrolet
45	Ryan Ellis	Alpha Prime Racing	Chevrolet
48	Parker Kligerman	Big Machine Racing	Chevrolet
51	Jeremy Clements	Jeremy Clements Racing	Chevrolet
53	C. J. McLaughlin	Emerling-Gase Motorsports	Ford
66	Dexter Stacey	MBM Motorsports	Chevrolet
74	Mike Harmon	CHK Racing	Chevrolet
78	Anthony Alfredo	B. J. McLeod Motorsports	Chevrolet
91	Josh Bilicki	DGM Racing	Chevrolet
92	Josh Williams	DGM Racing	Chevrolet
98	Riley Herbst	Stewart-Haas Racing	Ford
Official entry list

== Qualifying ==
Qualifying was held on Friday, April 21, at 4:35 PM CST. Since Talladega Superspeedway is a superspeedway, the qualifying system used is a single-car, single-lap system with two rounds. In the first round, drivers have one lap to set a time. The fastest ten drivers from the first round move on to the second round. Whoever sets the fastest time in Round 2 wins the pole.

Austin Hill, driving for Richard Childress Racing, would win the pole after advancing from the preliminary round and setting the fastest time in Round 2, with a lap of 52.483, and an average speed of 182.459 mph (293.639 km/h).

Four drivers would fail to qualify: Jason White, Jesse Iwuji, David Starr, and Mike Harmon.

Pos.	#	Driver	Team	Make	Time (R1)	Speed (R1)	Time (R2)	Speed (R2)
1	21	Austin Hill	Richard Childress Racing	Chevrolet	52.578	182.129	52.483	182.459
2	2	Sheldon Creed	Richard Childress Racing	Chevrolet	52.741	181.567	52.722	181.632
3	20	John Hunter Nemechek	Joe Gibbs Racing	Toyota	52.955	180.833	52.843	181.216
4	31	Parker Retzlaff (R)	Jordan Anderson Racing	Chevrolet	52.905	181.004	52.877	181.100
5	5	Jade Buford	Big Machine Racing	Chevrolet	53.050	180.509	52.902	181.014
6	78	Anthony Alfredo	B. J. McLeod Motorsports	Chevrolet	52.693	181.732	52.922	180.946
7	7	Justin Allgaier	JR Motorsports	Chevrolet	53.001	180.676	52.950	180.850
8	27	Jeb Burton	Jordan Anderson Racing	Chevrolet	52.867	181.134	52.954	180.836
9	11	Daniel Hemric	Kaulig Racing	Chevrolet	52.976	180.761	52.999	180.683
10	25	Brett Moffitt	AM Racing	Ford	53.055	180.492	53.167	180.112
Eliminated in Round 1
11	16	Chandler Smith (R)	Kaulig Racing	Chevrolet	53.057	180.485	—	—
12	18	Sammy Smith (R)	Joe Gibbs Racing	Toyota	53.076	180.421	—	—
13	19	Ryan Truex	Joe Gibbs Racing	Toyota	53.088	180.380	—	—
14	10	Derek Kraus	Kaulig Racing	Chevrolet	53.141	180.200	—	—
15	98	Riley Herbst	Stewart-Haas Racing	Ford	53.185	180.051	—	—
16	1	Sam Mayer	JR Motorsports	Chevrolet	53.216	179.946	—	—
17	6	Brennan Poole	JD Motorsports	Chevrolet	53.217	179.942	—	—
18	00	Cole Custer	Stewart-Haas Racing	Ford	53.226	179.912	—	—
19	44	Jeffrey Earnhardt	Alpha Prime Racing	Chevrolet	53.286	179.709	—	—
20	8	Josh Berry	JR Motorsports	Chevrolet	53.307	179.639	—	—
21	9	Brandon Jones	JR Motorsports	Chevrolet	53.315	179.612	—	—
22	66	Dexter Stacey	MBM Motorsports	Chevrolet	53.375	179.410	—	—
23	92	Josh Williams	DGM Racing	Chevrolet	53.400	179.326	—	—
24	24	Parker Chase	Sam Hunt Racing	Toyota	53.401	179.322	—	—
25	38	Joe Graf Jr.	RSS Racing	Ford	53.403	179.316	—	—
26	08	Gray Gaulding	SS-Green Light Racing	Chevrolet	53.433	179.215	—	—
27	28	Kyle Sieg	RSS Racing	Ford	53.436	179.205	—	—
28	43	Caesar Bacarella	Alpha Prime Racing	Chevrolet	53.452	179.151	—	—
29	4	Garrett Smithley	JD Motorsports	Chevrolet	53.489	179.027	—	—
30	26	Kaz Grala	Sam Hunt Racing	Toyota	53.581	178.720	—	—
31	39	Ryan Sieg	RSS Racing	Ford	53.592	178.683	—	—
32	53	C. J. McLaughlin	Emerling-Gase Motorsports	Ford	53.609	178.627	—	—
33	35	Joey Gase	Emerling-Gase Motorsports	Ford	53.613	178.613	—	—
Qualified by owner's points
34	02	Blaine Perkins	Our Motorsports	Chevrolet	53.631	178.553	—	—
35	91	Josh Bilicki	DGM Racing	Chevrolet	53.727	178.234	—	—
36	45	Ryan Ellis	Alpha Prime Racing	Chevrolet	53.799	177.996	—	—
37	51	Jeremy Clements	Jeremy Clements Racing	Chevrolet	53.816	177.940	—	—
38	48	Parker Kligerman	Big Machine Racing	Chevrolet	—	—	—	—
Failed to qualify
39	13	Jason White	MBM Motorsports	Ford	53.682	178.384	—	—
40	34	Jesse Iwuji	Jesse Iwuji Motorsports	Chevrolet	53.773	178.082	—	—
41	07	David Starr	SS-Green Light Racing	Chevrolet	53.797	178.002	—	—
42	74	Mike Harmon	CHK Racing	Chevrolet	54.560	175.513	—	—
Official qualifying results
Official starting lineup

== Race results ==
=== Summary ===
The race would be marred by several violent wrecks and flips. On lap 47, Dexter Stacey (making his first series start since Texas in 2016) would get loose and spin as the field went into turn 2. His car would clip the side of Blaine Perkins' car, causing him to hit the outside wall, make contact with Jade Buford, get airborne, and flipped violently six times before coming to rest on all four tires. During the wreck, Kaz Grala hit Perkins' wheel with the front of his car. Perkins was able to evacuate his car under his own power, but was later transported to a local hospital for further evaluation. On lap 110, Daniel Hemric attempted to make an aggressive block on Sheldon Creed for the lead, but would ultimately misjudge his entry. He would end up spinning and catapulting up the racetrack after he was hit by Riley Herbst, hitting the outside wall, and flipping on his roof. He even took out the turn four camera during his wreck. His car came to a rest on its roof off of turn four on the apron of the track. He remained on his roof until safety crew arrived to assist him. Hemric was able to climb out of his car under his own power. At least 14 cars were involved in the wreck. The race restarted with two laps to go, but the caution would fly moments later, after a piece of debris was found on the racetrack. The field made a second attempt at a green-white-checkered finish; Jeb Burton was able to take advantage of the lead on the final lap, and held off a fast charging Sheldon Creed to pick up his 2nd career Xfinity Series win, and the first for Jordan Anderson Racing.

Stage 1 Laps: 25

Pos.	#	Driver	Team	Make	Pts
1	7	Justin Allgaier	JR Motorsports	Chevrolet	10
2	2	Sheldon Creed	Richard Childress Racing	Chevrolet	9
3	1	Sam Mayer	JR Motorsports	Chevrolet	8
4	27	Jeb Burton	Jordan Anderson Racing	Chevrolet	7
5	21	Austin Hill	Richard Childress Racing	Chevrolet	6
6	48	Parker Kligerman	Big Machine Racing	Chevrolet	5
7	19	Ryan Truex	Joe Gibbs Racing	Toyota	4
8	16	Chandler Smith (R)	Kaulig Racing	Chevrolet	3
9	8	Josh Berry	JR Motorsports	Chevrolet	2
10	98	Riley Herbst	Stewart-Haas Racing	Ford	1

Stage 2 Laps: 25

Pos.	#	Driver	Team	Make	Pts
1	27	Jeb Burton	Jordan Anderson Racing	Chevrolet	10
2	16	Chandler Smith (R)	Kaulig Racing	Chevrolet	9
3	19	Ryan Truex	Joe Gibbs Racing	Toyota	8
4	8	Josh Berry	JR Motorsports	Chevrolet	7
5	11	Daniel Hemric	Kaulig Racing	Chevrolet	6
6	21	Austin Hill	Richard Childress Racing	Chevrolet	5
7	10	Derek Kraus	Kaulig Racing	Chevrolet	4
8	2	Sheldon Creed	Richard Childress Racing	Chevrolet	3
9	9	Brandon Jones	JR Motorsports	Chevrolet	2
10	7	Justin Allgaier	JR Motorsports	Chevrolet	1

Stage 3 Laps: 71

Fin	St	#	Driver	Team	Make	Laps	Led	Status	Pts
1	8	27	Jeb Burton	Jordan Anderson Racing	Chevrolet	121	17	Running	57
2	2	2	Sheldon Creed	Richard Childress Racing	Chevrolet	121	11	Running	47
3	38	48	Parker Kligerman	Big Machine Racing	Chevrolet	121	0	Running	39
4	18	00	Cole Custer	Stewart-Haas Racing	Ford	121	0	Running	33
5	17	6	Brennan Poole	JD Motorsports	Chevrolet	121	2	Running	32
6	28	43	Caesar Bacarella	Alpha Prime Racing	Chevrolet	121	0	Running	31
7	4	31	Parker Retzlaff (R)	Jordan Anderson Racing	Chevrolet	121	2	Running	30
8	26	08	Gray Gaulding	SS-Green Light Racing	Chevrolet	121	0	Running	29
9	33	35	Joey Gase	Emerling-Gase Motorsports	Ford	121	0	Running	28
10	23	92	Josh Williams	DGM Racing	Chevrolet	121	0	Running	27
11	36	45	Ryan Ellis	Alpha Prime Racing	Chevrolet	121	0	Running	26
12	10	25	Brett Moffitt	AM Racing	Ford	121	20	Running	25
13	32	53	C. J. McLaughlin	Emerling-Gase Motorsports	Ford	121	0	Running	24
14	21	9	Brandon Jones	JR Motorsports	Chevrolet	121	0	Running	25
15	27	28	Kyle Sieg	RSS Racing	Ford	121	0	Running	22
16	29	4	Garrett Smithley	JD Motorsports	Chevrolet	121	0	Running	21
17	13	19	Ryan Truex	Joe Gibbs Racing	Toyota	121	9	Running	32
18	1	21	Austin Hill	Richard Childress Racing	Chevrolet	121	14	Running	30
19	37	51	Jeremy Clements	Jeremy Clements Racing	Chevrolet	120	0	Accident	18
20	25	38	Joe Graf Jr.	RSS Racing	Ford	113	0	Running	17
21	9	11	Daniel Hemric	Kaulig Racing	Chevrolet	110	15	Accident	22
22	31	39	Ryan Sieg	RSS Racing	Ford	110	18	Accident	15
23	15	98	Riley Herbst	Stewart-Haas Racing	Ford	110	0	Accident	15
24	30	26	Kaz Grala	Sam Hunt Racing	Toyota	110	0	Accident	13
25	11	16	Chandler Smith (R)	Kaulig Racing	Chevrolet	110	1	Accident	24
26	35	91	Josh Bilicki	DGM Racing	Chevrolet	110	0	Accident	11
27	14	10	Derek Kraus	Kaulig Racing	Chevrolet	110	0	DVP	14
28	7	7	Justin Allgaier	JR Motorsports	Chevrolet	100	7	Accident	20
29	16	1	Sam Mayer	JR Motorsports	Chevrolet	100	0	Accident	16
30	20	8	Josh Berry	JR Motorsports	Chevrolet	100	0	Accident	16
31	19	44	Jeffrey Earnhardt	Alpha Prime Racing	Chevrolet	83	0	Transmission	6
32	3	20	John Hunter Nemechek	Joe Gibbs Racing	Toyota	81	0	Accident	5
33	12	18	Sammy Smith (R)	Joe Gibbs Racing	Toyota	63	0	Accident	4
34	34	02	Blaine Perkins	Our Motorsports	Chevrolet	47	0	Accident	3
35	22	66	Dexter Stacey	MBM Motorsports	Chevrolet	47	0	Accident	2
36	5	5	Jade Buford	Big Machine Racing	Chevrolet	47	0	Accident	1
37	6	78	Anthony Alfredo	B. J. McLeod Motorsports	Chevrolet	37	5	Accident	1
38	24	24	Parker Chase	Sam Hunt Racing	Toyota	37	0	DVP	1
Official race results

== Standings after the race ==
Drivers' Championship standings

	Pos	Driver	Points
1	1	Austin Hill	328
1	2	John Hunter Nemechek	324 (-4)
	3	Chandler Smith	309 (–19)
	4	Riley Herbst	296 (–32)
	5	Josh Berry	292 (–36)
	6	Justin Allgaier	287 (–41)
1	7	Cole Custer	279 (–49)
2	8	Sheldon Creed	276 (–52)
2	9	Sammy Smith	258 (–70)
1	10	Daniel Hemric	255 (–73)
1	11	Parker Kligerman	247 (–81)
1	12	Sam Mayer	237 (–91)
Official driver's standings

- Note: Only the first 12 positions are included for the driver standings.

Previous race: 2023 Call 811.com Before You Dig 250	NASCAR Xfinity Series; 2023 season	Next race: 2023 A-GAME 200
