= 2023 Pacific Office Automation 147 =

13th race of the 2023 NASCAR Xfinity Series

Race details
- Race 13 of 33 of the 2023 NASCAR Xfinity Series
- Date: June 3, 2023
- Official name: 2nd Annual Pacific Office Automation 147
- Location: Portland International Raceway, Portland, Oregon
- Course: Permanent racing facility
- Course length: 1.967 miles (3.166 km)
- Distance: 77 laps, 151 mi (243 km)
- Scheduled distance: 75 laps, 147 mi (237 km)
- Average speed: 65.126 mph (104.810 km/h)

Pole position
| Driver | Sheldon Creed | Richard Childress Racing |
- Time: 1:14.111

Most laps led
| Driver | Sheldon Creed | Richard Childress Racing |
- Laps: 47

Winner
| No. 00 | Cole Custer | Stewart-Haas Racing |

Television in the United States
- Network: FS1
- Announcers: Adam Alexander, Trevor Bayne, and Jamie McMurray

Radio in the United States
- Radio: MRN

The 2023 Pacific Office Automation 147 was the 13th stock car race of the 2023 NASCAR Xfinity Series, and the 2nd iteration of the event. The race was held on Saturday, June 3, 2023, in Portland, Oregon at Portland International Raceway, a 1.967 miles (3.166 km) permanent road course. The race was increased from 75 to 77 laps, due to a NASCAR overtime finish. In a wild finish, Cole Custer, driving for Stewart-Haas Racing, would take advantage of the lead with two laps to go, after the 3rd-place driver of Parker Kligerman locked his brakes coming into turn one, ultimately forcing Justin Allgaier and Sheldon Creed to miss the chicane. Custer eventually held off Allgaier in a last lap dash to earn his 11th career NASCAR Xfinity Series win, and his first of the season. Creed, who started on the pole, would dominate the race in general, leading a race-high 47 laps. To fill out the podium, Allgaier, driving for JR Motorsports, and Sam Mayer, also driving for JR Motorsports, would finish 2nd and 3rd, respectively.

== Background ==
Portland International Raceway (PIR) is a motorsport facility in Portland in the U.S. state of Oregon. It is part of the Delta Park complex on the former site of Vanport, just south of the Columbia River. It lies west of the Delta Park/Vanport light rail station and less than a mile west of Interstate 5.

The track hosts the IndyCar Series, ICSCC and SCCA and OMRRA road racing, the NASCAR K&N Pro Series West, and SCCA autocross events. Additionally, the PIR grounds are host to OBRA (Oregon Bicycle Racing Association) bicycling races on the track and the surrounding grounds. The facility includes a dragstrip and a motocross track.

=== Entry list ===
- (R) denotes rookie driver.
- (i) denotes driver who is ineligible for series driver points.

| # | Driver | Team | Make |
|---|---|---|---|
| 00 | Cole Custer | Stewart-Haas Racing | Ford |
| 1 | Sam Mayer | JR Motorsports | Chevrolet |
| 02 | Blaine Perkins (R) | Our Motorsports | Chevrolet |
| 2 | Sheldon Creed | Richard Childress Racing | Chevrolet |
| 4 | Garrett Smithley | JD Motorsports | Chevrolet |
| 6 | Brennan Poole | JD Motorsports | Chevrolet |
| 07 | Stefan Parsons | SS-Green Light Racing | Chevrolet |
| 7 | Justin Allgaier | JR Motorsports | Chevrolet |
| 08 | Preston Pardus | Pardus Racing Inc. | Chevrolet |
| 8 | Josh Berry | JR Motorsports | Chevrolet |
| 9 | Brandon Jones | JR Motorsports | Chevrolet |
| 10 | Jordan Taylor (i) | Kaulig Racing | Chevrolet |
| 11 | Daniel Hemric | Kaulig Racing | Chevrolet |
| 16 | Chandler Smith (R) | Kaulig Racing | Chevrolet |
| 18 | Sammy Smith (R) | Joe Gibbs Racing | Toyota |
| 19 | Myatt Snider | Joe Gibbs Racing | Toyota |
| 20 | John Hunter Nemechek | Joe Gibbs Racing | Toyota |
| 21 | Austin Hill | Richard Childress Racing | Chevrolet |
| 24 | Connor Mosack (R) | Sam Hunt Racing | Toyota |
| 25 | Brett Moffitt | AM Racing | Ford |
| 26 | Kaz Grala | Sam Hunt Racing | Toyota |
| 27 | Jeb Burton | Jordan Anderson Racing | Chevrolet |
| 28 | Kyle Sieg | RSS Racing | Ford |
| 31 | Parker Retzlaff (R) | Jordan Anderson Racing | Chevrolet |
| 35 | Parker Chase | Emerling-Gase Motorsports | Toyota |
| 38 | Joe Graf Jr. | RSS Racing | Ford |
| 39 | Ryan Sieg | RSS Racing | Ford |
| 43 | Leland Honeyman | Alpha Prime Racing | Chevrolet |
| 44 | Dylan Lupton | Alpha Prime Racing | Chevrolet |
| 45 | Jeffrey Earnhardt | Alpha Prime Racing | Chevrolet |
| 48 | Parker Kligerman | Big Machine Racing | Chevrolet |
| 51 | Jeremy Clements | Jeremy Clements Racing | Chevrolet |
| 53 | Patrick Emerling | Emerling-Gase Motorsports | Chevrolet |
| 66 | Mason Maggio (i) | MBM Motorsports | Toyota |
| 78 | Anthony Alfredo | B. J. McLeod Motorsports | Chevrolet |
| 91 | Alex Labbé | DGM Racing | Chevrolet |
| 92 | Josh Williams | DGM Racing | Chevrolet |
| 98 | Riley Herbst | Stewart-Haas Racing | Ford |
Official entry list

== Practice ==
For practice, drivers were split into two groups, Group A and B. Both sessions were 15 minutes long, and was held on Saturday, June 3, at 8:30 AM PST. Parker Kligerman, driving for Big Machine Racing, would set the fastest time between both groups, with a lap of 1:15.123, and a speed of 94.405 mph (151.930 km/h).

| Pos. | # | Driver | Team | Make | Time | Speed |
|---|---|---|---|---|---|---|
| 1 | 48 | Parker Kligerman | Big Machine Racing | Chevrolet | 1:15.123 | 94.405 |
| 2 | 00 | Cole Custer | Stewart-Haas Racing | Ford | 1:15.434 | 94.016 |
| 3 | 18 | Sammy Smith (R) | Joe Gibbs Racing | Toyota | 1:15.468 | 93.974 |
Full practice results

== Qualifying ==
Qualifying was held on Saturday, June 3, at 9:00 AM PST. Since Portland International Raceway is a road course, the qualifying system is a two group system, with two rounds. Drivers will be separated into two groups, Group A and Group B. Each driver will have multiple laps to set a time. The fastest 5 drivers from each group will advance to the final round. The fastest driver to set a time in that round will win the pole. Sheldon Creed, driving for Richard Childress Racing, would score the pole for the race, with a lap of 1:14.111, and an average speed of 95.694 mph (154.005 km/h).

| Pos. | # | Driver | Team | Make | Time (R1) | Speed (R1) | Time (R2) | Speed (R2) |
|---|---|---|---|---|---|---|---|---|
| 1 | 2 | Sheldon Creed | Richard Childress Racing | Chevrolet | 1:15.079 | 94.461 | 1:14.111 | 95.694 |
| 2 | 00 | Cole Custer | Stewart-Haas Racing | Ford | 1:14.743 | 94.885 | 1:14.341 | 95.398 |
| 3 | 8 | Josh Berry | JR Motorsports | Chevrolet | 1:14.852 | 94.747 | 1:14.463 | 95.242 |
| 4 | 20 | John Hunter Nemechek | Joe Gibbs Racing | Toyota | 1:14.628 | 95.031 | 1:14.553 | 95.127 |
| 5 | 7 | Justin Allgaier | JR Motorsports | Chevrolet | 1:15.083 | 94.455 | 1:14.734 | 94.897 |
| 6 | 10 | Jordan Taylor (i) | Kaulig Racing | Chevrolet | 1:15.107 | 94.425 | 1:14.832 | 94.772 |
| 7 | 16 | Chandler Smith (R) | Kaulig Racing | Chevrolet | 1:14.474 | 95.228 | 1:14.852 | 94.747 |
| 8 | 21 | Austin Hill | Richard Childress Racing | Chevrolet | 1:14.613 | 95.050 | 1:14.915 | 94.667 |
| 9 | 19 | Myatt Snider | Joe Gibbs Racing | Toyota | 1:14.857 | 94.741 | 1:15.045 | 94.503 |
| 10 | 11 | Daniel Hemric | Kaulig Racing | Chevrolet | 1:14.541 | 95.142 | 1:15.060 | 94.484 |
Eliminated from Round 1
| 11 | 24 | Connor Mosack (R) | Sam Hunt Racing | Toyota | 1:14.860 | 94.737 | — | — |
| 12 | 98 | Riley Herbst | Stewart-Haas Racing | Ford | 1:15.059 | 94.486 | — | — |
| 13 | 27 | Jeb Burton | Jordan Anderson Racing | Chevrolet | 1:15.177 | 94.337 | — | — |
| 14 | 48 | Parker Kligerman | Big Machine Racing | Chevrolet | 1:15.227 | 94.275 | — | — |
| 15 | 91 | Alex Labbé | DGM Racing | Chevrolet | 1:15.252 | 94.243 | — | — |
| 16 | 18 | Sammy Smith (R) | Joe Gibbs Racing | Toyota | 1:15.281 | 94.207 | — | — |
| 17 | 78 | Anthony Alfredo | B. J. McLeod Motorsports | Chevrolet | 1:15.399 | 94.060 | — | — |
| 18 | 26 | Kaz Grala | Sam Hunt Racing | Toyota | 1:15.473 | 93.967 | — | — |
| 19 | 25 | Brett Moffitt | AM Racing | Ford | 1:15.610 | 93.797 | — | — |
| 20 | 51 | Jeremy Clements | Jeremy Clements Racing | Chevrolet | 1:15.835 | 93.519 | — | — |
| 21 | 43 | Leland Honeyman | Alpha Prime Racing | Chevrolet | 1:15.902 | 93.436 | — | — |
| 22 | 44 | Dylan Lupton | Alpha Prime Racing | Chevrolet | 1:16.181 | 93.094 | — | — |
| 23 | 31 | Parker Retzlaff (R) | Jordan Anderson Racing | Chevrolet | 1:16.244 | 93.017 | — | — |
| 24 | 39 | Ryan Sieg | RSS Racing | Ford | 1:16.336 | 92.905 | — | — |
| 25 | 08 | Preston Pardus | SS-Green Light Racing | Ford | 1:16.600 | 92.585 | — | — |
| 26 | 6 | Brennan Poole | JD Motorsports | Chevrolet | 1:16.620 | 92.561 | — | — |
| 27 | 02 | Blaine Perkins (R) | Our Motorsports | Chevrolet | 1:17.072 | 92.018 | — | — |
| 28 | 92 | Josh Williams | DGM Racing | Chevrolet | 1:17.174 | 91.896 | — | — |
| 29 | 53 | Patrick Emerling | Emerling-Gase Motorsports | Chevrolet | 1:17.308 | 91.737 | — | — |
| 30 | 28 | Kyle Sieg | RSS Racing | Ford | 1:17.445 | 91.575 | — | — |
| 31 | 45 | Jeffrey Earnhardt | Alpha Prime Racing | Chevrolet | 1:17.461 | 91.556 | — | — |
| 32 | 35 | Parker Chase | Emerling-Gase Motorsports | Toyota | 1:17.526 | 91.479 | — | — |
| 33 | 38 | Joe Graf Jr. | RSS Racing | Ford | 1:18.025 | 90.894 | — | — |
Qualified by owner's points
| 34 | 66 | Mason Maggio (i) | MBM Motorsports | Toyota | 1:18.447 | 90.405 | — | — |
| 35 | 4 | Garrett Smithley | JD Motorsports | Chevrolet | 1:18.521 | 90.320 | — | — |
| 36 | 1 | Sam Mayer | JR Motorsports | Chevrolet | — | — | — | — |
| 37 | 9 | Brandon Jones | JR Motorsports | Chevrolet | — | — | — | — |
| 38 | 07 | Stefan Parsons | SS-Green Light Racing | Chevrolet | — | — | — | — |
Official qualifying results
Official starting lineup

== Post-race conflict ==
After the race, a heated discussion took place between Jordan Anderson Racing driver Jeb Burton and Kaulig Racing driver Chandler Smith. With under ten laps to go, Smith bumped into the back of Burton coming into turn four, causing him to spin through the grass. After the race, Burton attempted to confront Smith on pit road. After throwing a few shots, Burton was cut off by Smith's pit crew members. In the end, one of the crew members put Burton in a headlock. After the scuffle, Burton went into a heated argument with Kaulig Racing president Chris Rice.

== Race results ==
Stage 1 Laps: 25

| Pos. | # | Driver | Team | Make | Pts |
|---|---|---|---|---|---|
| 1 | 2 | Sheldon Creed | Richard Childress Racing | Chevrolet | 10 |
| 2 | 20 | John Hunter Nemechek | Joe Gibbs Racing | Toyota | 9 |
| 3 | 7 | Justin Allgaier | JR Motorsports | Chevrolet | 8 |
| 4 | 21 | Austin Hill | Richard Childress Racing | Chevrolet | 7 |
| 5 | 8 | Josh Berry | JR Motorsports | Chevrolet | 6 |
| 6 | 10 | Jordan Taylor (i) | Kaulig Racing | Chevrolet | 0 |
| 7 | 00 | Cole Custer | Stewart-Haas Racing | Ford | 4 |
| 8 | 19 | Myatt Snider | Joe Gibbs Racing | Toyota | 3 |
| 9 | 48 | Parker Kligerman | Big Machine Racing | Chevrolet | 2 |
| 10 | 98 | Riley Herbst | Stewart-Haas Racing | Ford | 1 |

Stage 2 Laps: 25

| Pos. | # | Driver | Team | Make | Pts |
|---|---|---|---|---|---|
| 1 | 00 | Cole Custer | Stewart-Haas Racing | Ford | 10 |
| 2 | 20 | John Hunter Nemechek | Joe Gibbs Racing | Toyota | 9 |
| 3 | 7 | Justin Allgaier | JR Motorsports | Chevrolet | 8 |
| 4 | 48 | Parker Kligerman | Big Machine Racing | Chevrolet | 7 |
| 5 | 10 | Jordan Taylor (i) | Kaulig Racing | Chevrolet | 0 |
| 6 | 2 | Sheldon Creed | Richard Childress Racing | Chevrolet | 5 |
| 7 | 1 | Sam Mayer | JR Motorsports | Chevrolet | 4 |
| 8 | 98 | Riley Herbst | Stewart-Haas Racing | Ford | 3 |
| 9 | 21 | Austin Hill | Richard Childress Racing | Chevrolet | 2 |
| 10 | 27 | Jeb Burton | Jordan Anderson Racing | Chevrolet | 1 |

Stage 3 Laps: 27

| Pos. | St | # | Driver | Team | Make | Laps | Led | Status | Pts |
|---|---|---|---|---|---|---|---|---|---|
| 1 | 2 | 00 | Cole Custer | Stewart-Haas Racing | Ford | 77 | 5 | Running | 54 |
| 2 | 5 | 7 | Justin Allgaier | JR Motorsports | Chevrolet | 77 | 23 | Running | 51 |
| 3 | 36 | 1 | Sam Mayer | JR Motorsports | Chevrolet | 77 | 0 | Running | 38 |
| 4 | 3 | 8 | Josh Berry | JR Motorsports | Chevrolet | 77 | 0 | Running | 39 |
| 5 | 8 | 21 | Austin Hill | Richard Childress Racing | Chevrolet | 77 | 0 | Running | 41 |
| 6 | 9 | 19 | Myatt Snider | Joe Gibbs Racing | Toyota | 77 | 0 | Running | 34 |
| 7 | 1 | 2 | Sheldon Creed | Richard Childress Racing | Chevrolet | 77 | 47 | Running | 45 |
| 8 | 11 | 24 | Connor Mosack (R) | Sam Hunt Racing | Toyota | 77 | 0 | Running | 29 |
| 9 | 7 | 16 | Chandler Smith (R) | Kaulig Racing | Chevrolet | 77 | 0 | Running | 28 |
| 10 | 4 | 20 | John Hunter Nemechek | Joe Gibbs Racing | Toyota | 77 | 2 | Running | 45 |
| 11 | 15 | 91 | Alex Labbé | DGM Racing | Chevrolet | 77 | 0 | Running | 26 |
| 12 | 19 | 25 | Brett Moffitt | AM Racing | Ford | 77 | 0 | Running | 25 |
| 13 | 37 | 9 | Brandon Jones | JR Motorsports | Chevrolet | 77 | 0 | Running | 24 |
| 14 | 14 | 48 | Parker Kligerman | Big Machine Racing | Chevrolet | 77 | 0 | Running | 32 |
| 15 | 27 | 02 | Blaine Perkins (R) | Our Motorsports | Chevrolet | 77 | 0 | Running | 22 |
| 16 | 28 | 92 | Josh Williams | DGM Racing | Chevrolet | 77 | 0 | Running | 21 |
| 17 | 23 | 31 | Parker Retzlaff (R) | Jordan Anderson Racing | Chevrolet | 77 | 0 | Running | 20 |
| 18 | 24 | 39 | Ryan Sieg | RSS Racing | Ford | 77 | 0 | Running | 19 |
| 19 | 31 | 45 | Jeffrey Earnhardt | Alpha Prime Racing | Chevrolet | 77 | 0 | Running | 18 |
| 20 | 29 | 53 | Patrick Emerling | Emerling-Gase Motorsports | Chevrolet | 77 | 0 | Running | 17 |
| 21 | 17 | 78 | Anthony Alfredo | B. J. McLeod Motorsports | Chevrolet | 77 | 0 | Running | 16 |
| 22 | 20 | 51 | Jeremy Clements | Jeremy Clements Racing | Chevrolet | 77 | 0 | Running | 15 |
| 23 | 33 | 38 | Joe Graf Jr. | RSS Racing | Ford | 77 | 0 | Running | 14 |
| 24 | 35 | 4 | Garrett Smithley | JD Motorsports | Chevrolet | 77 | 0 | Running | 13 |
| 25 | 13 | 27 | Jeb Burton | Jordan Anderson Racing | Chevrolet | 77 | 0 | Running | 13 |
| 26 | 18 | 26 | Kaz Grala | Sam Hunt Racing | Toyota | 77 | 0 | Running | 11 |
| 27 | 6 | 10 | Jordan Taylor (i) | Kaulig Racing | Chevrolet | 77 | 0 | Running | 0 |
| 28 | 21 | 43 | Leland Honeyman (Note: After the first stage, Leland Honeyman was replaced by Brad Perez, due to Honeyman suffering from food poisoning. Since Honeyman started the race, his is officially credited with the 28th place finish.) | Alpha Prime Racing | Chevrolet | 76 | 0 | Accident | 9 |
| 29 | 22 | 44 | Dylan Lupton | Alpha Prime Racing | Chevrolet | 76 | 0 | Running | 8 |
| 30 | 16 | 18 | Sammy Smith (R) | Joe Gibbs Racing | Toyota | 75 | 0 | Running | 7 |
| 31 | 25 | 08 | Preston Pardus | SS-Green Light Racing | Ford | 72 | 0 | Running | 6 |
| 32 | 12 | 98 | Riley Herbst | Stewart-Haas Racing | Ford | 65 | 0 | Engine | 9 |
| 33 | 10 | 11 | Daniel Hemric | Kaulig Racing | Chevrolet | 47 | 0 | Running | 4 |
| 34 | 30 | 28 | Kyle Sieg | RSS Racing | Ford | 46 | 0 | Rear Gear | 3 |
| 35 | 32 | 35 | Parker Chase | Emerling-Gase Motorsports | Toyota | 36 | 0 | Tie Rod | 2 |
| 36 | 34 | 66 | Mason Maggio (i) | MBM Motorsports | Toyota | 28 | 0 | Transmission | 0 |
| 37 | 38 | 07 | Stefan Parsons | SS-Green Light Racing | Chevrolet | 17 | 0 | Overheating | 1 |
| 38 | 26 | 6 | Brennan Poole | JD Motorsports | Chevrolet | 15 | 0 | Accident | 1 |
Official race results

== Standings after the race ==
Drivers' Championship standings

| | Pos | Driver | Points |
|---|---|---|---|
| | 1 | John Hunter Nemechek | 522 |
| | 2 | Austin Hill | 508 (-14) |
| | 3 | Justin Allgaier | 478 (–44) |
| | 4 | Cole Custer | 457 (–65) |
| | 5 | Josh Berry | 431 (–91) |
| | 6 | Chandler Smith | 402 (–120) |
| | 7 | Sheldon Creed | 396 (–126) |
| | 8 | Sammy Smith | 357 (–165) |
| 2 | 9 | Sam Mayer | 353 (–169) |
| 1 | 10 | Riley Herbst | 346 (–176) |
| 1 | 11 | Daniel Hemric | 333 (–189) |
| 1 | 12 | Brandon Jones | 319 (–203) |
Official driver's standings

- Note: Only the first 12 positions are included for the driver standings.

| Previous race: 2023 Alsco Uniforms 300 (Charlotte) | NASCAR Xfinity Series; 2023 season | Next race: 2023 DoorDash 250 |
