= 2023 DoorDash 250 =

14th race of the 2023 NASCAR Xfinity Series

Race details
- Race 14 of 33 of the 2023 NASCAR Xfinity Series
- Date: June 10, 2023
- Official name: Inaugural DoorDash 250
- Location: Sonoma Raceway, Sonoma, California
- Course: Permanent racing facility
- Course length: 1.99 miles (3.20 km)
- Distance: 79 laps, 156 mi (251 km)
- Scheduled distance: 79 laps, 156 mi (251 km)
- Average speed: 76.388 mph (122.935 km/h)

Pole position
Driver	Kyle Larson	Hendrick Motorsports
- Time: 1:18.387

Most laps led
Driver	Kyle Larson	Hendrick Motorsports
- Laps: 53

Winner
No. 28	Aric Almirola	RSS Racing

Television in the United States
- Network: FS1
- Announcers: Adam Alexander, Kevin Harvick, and Austin Cindric

Radio in the United States
- Radio: PRN

The 2023 DoorDash 250 was the 14th stock car race of the 2023 NASCAR Xfinity Series, and the inaugural iteration of the event. The race was held on Saturday, June 10, 2023, in Sonoma, California at Sonoma Raceway, a 1.99 miles (3.20 km) permanent road course. The race took the scheduled 79 laps to complete. Aric Almirola, driving for RSS Racing, would score the upset win, after taking advantage of a pit road strategy, leading the final 15 laps of the race to earn his fourth career NASCAR Xfinity Series win, his first of the season, and the first NASCAR win for RSS Racing. Kyle Larson dominated nearly the entire race, winning both stages and leading a race-high 53 laps, but ultimately fell back and finished third. To fill out the podium, A. J. Allmendinger, driving for Kaulig Racing, and Larson, driving for Hendrick Motorsports, would finish 2nd and 3rd, respectively.

== Background ==
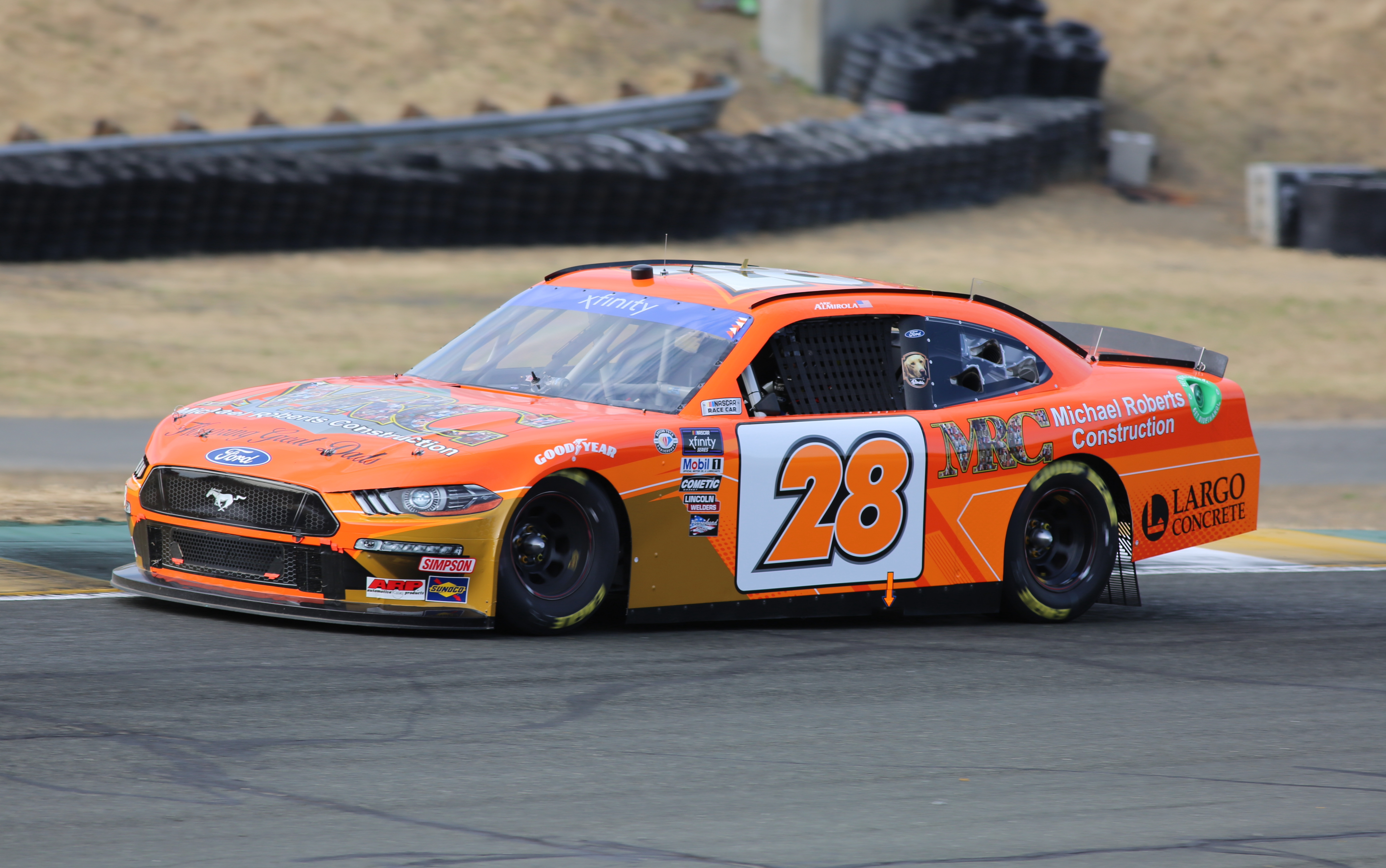
Aric Almirola racing the DoorDash 250 which he eventually won.

Sonoma Raceway is a 1.99-mile (3.20 km) road course and drag strip located on the landform known as Sears Point in the southern Sonoma Mountains in Sonoma, California, U.S. The road course features 12 turns on a hilly course with 160 feet (49 m) of total elevation change. It is host to one of only seven NASCAR Cup Series races each year that are run on road courses. It is also host to the NTT IndyCar Series and several other auto races and motorcycle races such as the American Federation of Motorcyclists series. Sonoma Raceway continues to host amateur, or club racing events which may or may not be open to the general public. The largest such car club is the Sports Car Club of America.

In 2022, the race was reverted to racing the club configuration.

=== Entry list ===
- (R) denotes rookie driver.
- (i) denotes driver who is ineligible for series driver points.

#	Driver	Team	Make
00	Cole Custer	Stewart-Haas Racing	Ford
1	Sam Mayer	JR Motorsports	Chevrolet
02	Blaine Perkins (R)	Our Motorsports	Chevrolet
2	Sheldon Creed	Richard Childress Racing	Chevrolet
4	Ty Dillon (i)	JD Motorsports	Chevrolet
6	Brennan Poole	JD Motorsports	Chevrolet
07	Daniel Suárez (i)	SS-Green Light Racing	Chevrolet
7	Justin Allgaier	JR Motorsports	Chevrolet
08	Kyle Weatherman	SS-Green Light Racing	Ford
8	Josh Berry	JR Motorsports	Chevrolet
9	Brandon Jones	JR Motorsports	Chevrolet
10	A. J. Allmendinger (i)	Kaulig Racing	Chevrolet
11	Daniel Hemric	Kaulig Racing	Chevrolet
16	Chandler Smith (R)	Kaulig Racing	Chevrolet
17	Kyle Larson (i)	Hendrick Motorsports	Chevrolet
18	Sammy Smith (R)	Joe Gibbs Racing	Toyota
19	Ty Gibbs (i)	Joe Gibbs Racing	Toyota
20	John Hunter Nemechek	Joe Gibbs Racing	Toyota
21	Austin Hill	Richard Childress Racing	Chevrolet
24	Connor Mosack (R)	Sam Hunt Racing	Toyota
25	Brett Moffitt	AM Racing	Ford
26	Kaz Grala	Sam Hunt Racing	Toyota
27	Jeb Burton	Jordan Anderson Racing	Chevrolet
28	Aric Almirola (i)	RSS Racing	Ford
29	Alex Labbé	RSS Racing	Ford
31	Parker Retzlaff (R)	Jordan Anderson Racing	Chevrolet
35	Leland Honeyman	Emerling-Gase Motorsports	Toyota
36	Josh Bilicki	DGM Racing	Chevrolet
38	Joe Graf Jr.	RSS Racing	Ford
39	Ryan Sieg	RSS Racing	Ford
43	Dylan Lupton	Alpha Prime Racing	Chevrolet
44	Sage Karam	Alpha Prime Racing	Chevrolet
45	Jeffrey Earnhardt	Alpha Prime Racing	Chevrolet
48	Parker Kligerman	Big Machine Racing	Chevrolet
51	Jeremy Clements	Jeremy Clements Racing	Chevrolet
53	Brad Perez	Emerling-Gase Motorsports	Toyota
66	Mason Filippi (i)	MBM Motorsports	Ford
78	Anthony Alfredo	B. J. McLeod Motorsports	Chevrolet
91	Ross Chastain (i)	DGM Racing	Chevrolet
92	Josh Williams	DGM Racing	Chevrolet
98	Riley Herbst	Stewart-Haas Racing	Ford
Official entry list

== Practice ==
The first and only practice session was held on Friday, June 9, at 1:05 PM PST, and would last for 50 minutes. Kyle Larson, driving for Hendrick Motorsports, would set the fastest time in the session, with a lap of 1:19.255, and an average speed of 90.392 mph (145.472 km/h).

Pos.	#	Driver	Team	Make	Time	Speed
1	17	Kyle Larson (i)	Hendrick Motorsports	Chevrolet	1:19.255	90.392
2	2	Sheldon Creed	Richard Childress Racing	Chevrolet	1:20.435	89.066
3	10	A. J. Allmendinger (i)	Kaulig Racing	Chevrolet	1:20.447	89.052
Full practice results

== Qualifying ==
Qualifying was held on Saturday, June 10, at 12:00 PM PST. Since Sonoma Raceway is a road course, the qualifying system is a two group system, with two rounds. Drivers will be separated into two groups, Group A and Group B. Each driver will have multiple laps to set a time. The fastest 5 drivers from each group will advance to the final round. The fastest driver to set a time in that round will win the pole. Kyle Larson, driving for Hendrick Motorsports, would score the pole for the race, with a lap of 1:18.387, and an average speed of 91.393 mph (147.083 km/h).

Pos.	#	Driver	Team	Make	Time (R1)	Speed (R1)	Time (R2)	Speed (R2)
1	17	Kyle Larson (i)	Hendrick Motorsports	Chevrolet	1:18.403	91.374	1:18.387	91.393
2	7	Justin Allgaier	JR Motorsports	Chevrolet	1:19.835	89.735	1:19.106	90.562
3	2	Sheldon Creed	Richard Childress Racing	Chevrolet	1:19.678	89.912	1:19.222	90.429
4	28	Aric Almirola (i)	RSS Racing	Ford	1:19.611	89.988	1:19.270	90.375
5	10	A. J. Allmendinger (i)	Kaulig Racing	Chevrolet	1:19.430	90.193	1:19.358	90.274
6	1	Sam Mayer	JR Motorsports	Chevrolet	1:19.524	90.086	1:19.415	90.210
7	19	Ty Gibbs (i)	Joe Gibbs Racing	Toyota	1:19.699	89.888	1:19.448	90.172
8	11	Daniel Hemric	Kaulig Racing	Chevrolet	1:19.452	90.168	1:19.585	90.017
9	20	John Hunter Nemechek	Joe Gibbs Racing	Toyota	1:19.639	89.956	1:19.673	89.918
10	18	Sammy Smith (R)	Joe Gibbs Racing	Toyota	1:19.620	89.977	1:19.795	89.780
Eliminated from Round 1
11	29	Alex Labbé	RSS Racing	Ford	1:19.701	89.886	—	—
12	48	Parker Kligerman	Big Machine Racing	Chevrolet	1:19.713	89.872	—	—
13	21	Austin Hill	Richard Childress Racing	Chevrolet	1:19.717	89.868	—	—
14	25	Brett Moffitt	AM Racing	Ford	1:19.717	89.868	—	—
15	91	Ross Chastain (i)	DGM Racing	Chevrolet	1:20.000	89.550	—	—
16	31	Parker Retzlaff (R)	Jordan Anderson Racing	Chevrolet	1:20.001	89.549	—	—
17	07	Daniel Suárez (i)	SS-Green Light Racing	Chevrolet	1:20.034	89.512	—	—
18	08	Kyle Weatherman	SS-Green Light Racing	Ford	1:20.095	89.444	—	—
19	8	Josh Berry	JR Motorsports	Chevrolet	1:20.155	89.377	—	—
20	16	Chandler Smith (R)	Kaulig Racing	Chevrolet	1:20.215	89.310	—	—
21	44	Sage Karam	Alpha Prime Racing	Chevrolet	1:20.285	89.232	—	—
22	92	Josh Williams	DGM Racing	Chevrolet	1:20.301	89.214	—	—
23	98	Riley Herbst	Stewart-Haas Racing	Ford	1:20.377	89.130	—	—
24	51	Jeremy Clements	Jeremy Clements Racing	Chevrolet	1:20.547	88.942	—	—
25	36	Josh Bilicki	DGM Racing	Chevrolet	1:20.587	88.898	—	—
26	00	Cole Custer	Stewart-Haas Racing	Ford	1:20.630	88.850	—	—
27	26	Kaz Grala	Sam Hunt Racing	Toyota	1:20.805	88.658	—	—
28	9	Brandon Jones	JR Motorsports	Chevrolet	1:20.812	88.650	—	—
29	24	Connor Mosack (R)	Sam Hunt Racing	Toyota	1:20.818	88.644	—	—
30	27	Jeb Burton	Jordan Anderson Racing	Chevrolet	1:20.866	88.591	—	—
31	53	Brad Perez	Emerling-Gase Motorsports	Toyota	1:20.940	88.510	—	—
32	4	Ty Dillon (i)	JD Motorsports	Chevrolet	1:21.000	88.444	—	—
33	43	Dylan Lupton	Alpha Prime Racing	Chevrolet	1:21.050	88.390	—	—
Qualified by owner's points
34	39	Ryan Sieg	RSS Racing	Ford	1:21.099	88.336	—	—
35	45	Jeffrey Earnhardt	Alpha Prime Racing	Chevrolet	1:21.379	88.033	—	—
36	02	Blaine Perkins (R)	Our Motorsports	Chevrolet	1:21.393	88.017	—	—
37	78	Anthony Alfredo	B. J. McLeod Motorsports	Chevrolet	1:21.589	87.806	—	—
38	38	Joe Graf Jr.	RSS Racing	Ford	1:22.015	87.350	—	—
Failed to qualify
39	6	Brennan Poole	JD Motorsports	Chevrolet	1:21.379	88.033	—	—
40	35	Leland Honeyman	Emerling-Gase Motorsports	Chevrolet	1:22.002	87.364	—	—
41	66	Mason Filippi (i)	MBM Motorsports	Ford	1:22.388	86.954	—	—
Official qualifying results
Official starting lineup

== Race results ==
Stage 1 Laps: 20

Pos.	#	Driver	Team	Make	Pts
1	17	Kyle Larson (i)	Hendrick Motorsports	Chevrolet	0
2	10	A. J. Allmendinger (i)	Kaulig Racing	Chevrolet	0
3	28	Aric Almirola (i)	RSS Racing	Ford	0
4	7	Justin Allgaier	JR Motorsports	Chevrolet	7
5	19	Ty Gibbs (i)	Joe Gibbs Racing	Toyota	0
6	11	Daniel Hemric	Kaulig Racing	Chevrolet	5
7	1	Sam Mayer	JR Motorsports	Chevrolet	4
8	48	Parker Kligerman	Big Machine Racing	Chevrolet	3
9	2	Sheldon Creed	Richard Childress Racing	Chevrolet	2
10	18	Sammy Smith (R)	Joe Gibbs Racing	Toyota	1

Stage 2 Laps: 25

Pos.	#	Driver	Team	Make	Pts
1	17	Kyle Larson (i)	Hendrick Motorsports	Chevrolet	0
2	10	A. J. Allmendinger (i)	Kaulig Racing	Chevrolet	0
3	19	Ty Gibbs (i)	Joe Gibbs Racing	Toyota	0
4	7	Justin Allgaier	JR Motorsports	Chevrolet	7
5	21	Austin Hill	Richard Childress Racing	Chevrolet	6
6	28	Aric Almirola (i)	RSS Racing	Ford	0
7	20	John Hunter Nemechek	Joe Gibbs Racing	Toyota	4
8	98	Riley Herbst	Stewart-Haas Racing	Ford	3
9	48	Parker Kligerman	Big Machine Racing	Chevrolet	2
10	1	Sam Mayer	JR Motorsports	Chevrolet	1

Stage 3 Laps: 34

Pos.	St	#	Driver	Team	Make	Laps	Led	Status	Pts
1	4	28	Aric Almirola (i)	RSS Racing	Ford	79	17	Running	0
2	5	10	A. J. Allmendinger (i)	Kaulig Racing	Chevrolet	79	2	Running	0
3	1	17	Kyle Larson (i)	Hendrick Motorsports	Chevrolet	79	53	Running	0
4	7	19	Ty Gibbs (i)	Joe Gibbs Racing	Toyota	79	0	Running	0
5	12	48	Parker Kligerman	Big Machine Racing	Chevrolet	79	0	Running	37
6	26	00	Cole Custer	Stewart-Haas Racing	Ford	79	0	Running	31
7	2	7	Justin Allgaier	JR Motorsports	Chevrolet	79	0	Running	44
8	13	21	Austin Hill	Richard Childress Racing	Chevrolet	79	4	Running	35
9	10	18	Sammy Smith (R)	Joe Gibbs Racing	Toyota	79	0	Running	29
10	6	1	Sam Mayer	JR Motorsports	Chevrolet	79	0	Running	32
11	3	2	Sheldon Creed	Richard Childress Racing	Chevrolet	79	0	Running	28
12	14	25	Brett Moffitt	AM Racing	Ford	79	0	Running	25
13	8	11	Daniel Hemric	Kaulig Racing	Chevrolet	79	0	Running	29
14	20	16	Chandler Smith (R)	Kaulig Racing	Chevrolet	79	0	Running	23
15	23	98	Riley Herbst	Stewart-Haas Racing	Ford	79	0	Running	25
16	9	20	John Hunter Nemechek	Joe Gibbs Racing	Toyota	79	1	Running	25
17	24	51	Jeremy Clements	Jeremy Clements Racing	Chevrolet	79	0	Running	20
18	15	91	Ross Chastain (i)	DGM Racing	Chevrolet	79	0	Running	0
19	25	36	Josh Bilicki	DGM Racing	Chevrolet	79	0	Running	18
20	27	26	Kaz Grala	Sam Hunt Racing	Toyota	79	0	Running	17
21	28	9	Brandon Jones	JR Motorsports	Chevrolet	79	0	Running	16
22	18	08	Kyle Weatherman	SS-Green Light Racing	Ford	79	0	Running	15
23	32	4	Ty Dillon (i)	JD Motorsports	Chevrolet	79	0	Running	0
24	33	43	Dylan Lupton	Alpha Prime Racing	Chevrolet	79	0	Running	13
25	11	29	Alex Labbé	RSS Racing	Ford	79	2	Running	12
26	30	27	Jeb Burton	Jordan Anderson Racing	Chevrolet	79	0	Running	11
27	17	07	Daniel Suárez (i)	SS-Green Light Racing	Chevrolet	79	0	Running	0
28	34	39	Ryan Sieg	RSS Racing	Ford	79	0	Running	9
29	31	53	Brad Perez	Emerling-Gase Motorsports	Toyota	79	0	Running	8
30	36	02	Blaine Perkins (R)	Our Motorsports	Chevrolet	79	0	Running	7
31	38	38	Joe Graf Jr.	RSS Racing	Ford	79	0	Running	6
32	29	24	Connor Mosack (R)	Sam Hunt Racing	Toyota	78	0	Running	5
33	19	8	Josh Berry	JR Motorsports	Chevrolet	76	0	Running	4
34	21	44	Sage Karam	Alpha Prime Racing	Chevrolet	71	0	Transmission	3
35	22	92	Josh Williams	DGM Racing	Chevrolet	60	0	Suspension	2
36	35	45	Jeffrey Earnhardt	Alpha Prime Racing	Chevrolet	59	0	Accident	1
37	37	78	Anthony Alfredo	B. J. McLeod Motorsports	Chevrolet	44	0	Suspension	1
38	16	31	Parker Retzlaff (R)	Jordan Anderson Racing	Chevrolet	21	0	Transmission	1
Official race results

== Standings after the race ==
Drivers' Championship standings

	Pos	Driver	Points
	1	John Hunter Nemechek	547
	2	Austin Hill	543 (-4)
	3	Justin Allgaier	522 (–25)
	4	Cole Custer	488 (–59)
	5	Josh Berry	435 (–112)
	6	Chandler Smith	425 (–122)
	7	Sheldon Creed	424 (–123)
	8	Sammy Smith	386 (–161)
	9	Sam Mayer	385 (–162)
	10	Riley Herbst	371 (–176)
	11	Daniel Hemric	362 (–185)
2	12	Parker Kligerman	344 (–203)
Official driver's standings

- Note: Only the first 12 positions are included for the driver standings.

Previous race: 2023 Pacific Office Automation 147	NASCAR Xfinity Series; 2023 season	Next race: 2023 Tennessee Lottery 250
