= 2022 SRS Distribution 250 =

Twelfth race of the 2022 NASCAR Xfinity Series

Race details
- Race 12 of 33 of the 2022 NASCAR Xfinity Series
- Date: May 21, 2022
- Official name: 26th Annual SRS Distribution 250
- Location: Fort Worth, Texas, Texas Motor Speedway
- Course: Permanent racing facility
- Course length: 1.5 miles (2.4 km)
- Distance: 167 laps, 250.5 mi (403.1 km)
- Scheduled distance: 167 laps, 250.5 mi (403.1 km)
- Average speed: 101.497 mph (163.344 km/h)

Pole position
| Driver | Noah Gragson | JR Motorsports |
- Time: 29.542

Most laps led
| Driver | Josh Berry | JR Motorsports |
- Laps: 46

Winner
| No. 48 | Tyler Reddick | Big Machine Racing |

Television in the United States
- Network: Fox Sports 1
- Announcers: Adam Alexander, Joey Logano and Kevin Harvick

Radio in the United States
- Radio: Motor Racing Network

The 2022 SRS Distribution 250 was the twelfth stock car race of the 2022 NASCAR Xfinity Series and the 26th iteration of the event. The race was held on Saturday, May 21, 2022, in Fort Worth, Texas at Texas Motor Speedway, a 1.5 miles (2.4 km) permanent quad-oval racetrack. The race was contested over 167 laps. Tyler Reddick, driving for Big Machine Racing, dominated during the end of the race, and earned his tenth career NASCAR Xfinity Series win. It was also the first NASCAR win for Big Machine Racing. To fill out the podium, William Byron and Sam Mayer, both driving for JR Motorsports, finished second and third, respectively.

== Background ==
Texas Motor Speedway is a speedway located in the northernmost portion of the U.S. city of Fort Worth, Texas – the portion located in Denton County, Texas. The reconfigured track measures 1.44 miles (2.32 km) with banked 20° in turns 1 and 2 and banked 24° in turns 3 and 4. Texas Motor Speedway is a quad-oval design, where the front straightaway juts outward slightly. The track layout is similar to Atlanta Motor Speedway and Charlotte Motor Speedway. The track is owned by Speedway Motorsports, Inc.

=== Entry list ===
- (R) denotes rookie driver.
- (i) denotes driver who are ineligible for series driver points.

| # | Driver | Team | Make |
|---|---|---|---|
| 1 | Sam Mayer | JR Motorsports | Chevrolet |
| 02 | Brett Moffitt | Our Motorsports | Chevrolet |
| 2 | Sheldon Creed (R) | Richard Childress Racing | Chevrolet |
| 4 | Bayley Currey | JD Motorsports | Chevrolet |
| 5 | Matt Mills | B. J. McLeod Motorsports | Chevrolet |
| 6 | Ryan Vargas | JD Motorsports | Chevrolet |
| 07 | Joe Graf Jr. | SS-Green Light Racing | Ford |
| 7 | Justin Allgaier | JR Motorsports | Chevrolet |
| 08 | David Starr | SS-Green Light Racing | Ford |
| 8 | Josh Berry | JR Motorsports | Chevrolet |
| 9 | Noah Gragson | JR Motorsports | Chevrolet |
| 10 | Landon Cassill | Kaulig Racing | Chevrolet |
| 11 | Daniel Hemric | Kaulig Racing | Chevrolet |
| 13 | Timmy Hill (i) | MBM Motorsports | Toyota |
| 16 | A. J. Allmendinger | Kaulig Racing | Chevrolet |
| 18 | Ryan Truex | Joe Gibbs Racing | Toyota |
| 19 | Brandon Jones | Joe Gibbs Racing | Toyota |
| 21 | Austin Hill (R) | Richard Childress Racing | Chevrolet |
| 23 | Anthony Alfredo | Our Motorsports | Chevrolet |
| 26 | Jeffrey Earnhardt | Sam Hunt Racing | Toyota |
| 27 | Jeb Burton | Our Motorsports | Chevrolet |
| 31 | Myatt Snider | Jordan Anderson Racing | Chevrolet |
| 34 | Jesse Iwuji (R) (Note: Due to a naval obligation, Kyle Weatherman practiced and qualified Iwuji's No. 34 car. Iwuji is expected to compete in the race.) | Jesse Iwuji Motorsports | Chevrolet |
| 35 | Patrick Emerling | Emerling-Gase Motorsports | Chevrolet |
| 36 | Alex Labbé | DGM Racing | Chevrolet |
| 38 | C. J. McLaughlin | RSS Racing | Ford |
| 39 | Ryan Sieg | RSS Racing | Ford |
| 44 | Ryan Ellis | Alpha Prime Racing | Chevrolet |
| 45 | Stefan Parsons | Alpha Prime Racing | Chevrolet |
| 47 | Brennan Poole | Mike Harmon Racing | Chevrolet |
| 48 | Tyler Reddick (i) | Big Machine Racing | Chevrolet |
| 51 | Jeremy Clements | Jeremy Clements Racing | Chevrolet |
| 54 | Ty Gibbs | Joe Gibbs Racing | Toyota |
| 66 | J. J. Yeley | MBM Motorsports | Ford |
| 68 | Brandon Brown | Brandonbilt Motorsports | Chevrolet |
| 78 | Josh Williams | B. J. McLeod Motorsports | Chevrolet |
| 88 | William Byron (i) | JR Motorsports | Chevrolet |
| 91 | Mason Massey | DGM Racing | Chevrolet |
| 98 | Riley Herbst | Stewart-Haas Racing | Ford |
Official entry list

== Practice ==
The only 30-minute practice session was held on Friday, May 20, at 5:00 PM CST. Ryan Truex of Joe Gibbs Racing was the fastest in the session, with a time of 30.151 seconds and a speed of 179.099 mph (288.232 km/h).

| Pos. | # | Driver | Team | Make | Time | Speed |
|---|---|---|---|---|---|---|
| 1 | 18 | Ryan Truex | Joe Gibbs Racing | Toyota | 30.151 | 179.099 |
| 2 | 7 | Justin Allgaier | JR Motorsports | Chevrolet | 30.177 | 178.944 |
| 3 | 48 | Tyler Reddick (i) | Big Machine Racing | Chevrolet | 30.257 | 178.471 |
Full practice results

== Qualifying ==
Qualifying was held on Friday, May 20, at 5:30 PM CST. Since Texas Motor Speedway is an oval track, the qualifying system used is a single-car, one-lap system with only one round. Whoever sets the fastest time in the round wins the pole.

Noah Gragson of JR Motorsports scored the pole for the race, with a time of 29.542 seconds and a speed of 182.791 mph (294.174 km/h).

| Pos. | # | Driver | Team | Make | Time | Speed |
|---|---|---|---|---|---|---|
| 1 | 9 | Noah Gragson | JR Motorsports | Chevrolet | 29.542 | 182.791 |
| 2 | 48 | Tyler Reddick (i) | Big Machine Racing | Chevrolet | 29.598 | 182.445 |
| 3 | 21 | Austin Hill (R) | Richard Childress Racing | Chevrolet | 29.611 | 182.365 |
| 4 | 19 | Brandon Jones | Joe Gibbs Racing | Toyota | 29.637 | 182.205 |
| 5 | 18 | Ryan Truex | Joe Gibbs Racing | Toyota | 29.684 | 181.916 |
| 6 | 7 | Justin Allgaier | JR Motorsports | Chevrolet | 29.692 | 181.867 |
| 7 | 54 | Ty Gibbs | Joe Gibbs Racing | Toyota | 29.695 | 181.849 |
| 8 | 8 | Josh Berry | JR Motorsports | Chevrolet | 29.718 | 181.708 |
| 9 | 1 | Sam Mayer | JR Motorsports | Chevrolet | 29.735 | 181.604 |
| 10 | 98 | Riley Herbst | Stewart-Haas Racing | Ford | 29.834 | 181.002 |
| 11 | 11 | Daniel Hemric | Kaulig Racing | Chevrolet | 29.882 | 180.711 |
| 12 | 39 | Ryan Sieg | RSS Racing | Ford | 29.958 | 180.252 |
| 13 | 16 | A. J. Allmendinger | Kaulig Racing | Chevrolet | 29.984 | 180.096 |
| 14 | 66 | J. J. Yeley | MBM Motorsports | Ford | 30.077 | 179.539 |
| 15 | 88 | William Byron (i) | JR Motorsports | Chevrolet | 30.078 | 179.533 |
| 16 | 02 | Brett Moffitt | Our Motorsports | Chevrolet | 30.079 | 179.527 |
| 17 | 34 | Kyle Weatherman | Jesse Iwuji Motorsports | Chevrolet | 30.100 | 179.402 |
| 18 | 45 | Stefan Parsons | Alpha Prime Racing | Chevrolet | 30.176 | 178.950 |
| 19 | 51 | Jeremy Clements | Jeremy Clements Racing | Chevrolet | 30.197 | 178.826 |
| 20 | 27 | Jeb Burton | Our Motorsports | Chevrolet | 30.228 | 178.642 |
| 21 | 2 | Sheldon Creed (R) | GMS Racing | Chevrolet | 30.267 | 178.412 |
| 22 | 4 | Bayley Currey | JD Motorsports | Chevrolet | 30.311 | 178.153 |
| 23 | 68 | Brandon Brown | Brandonbilt Motorsports | Chevrolet | 30.343 | 177.965 |
| 24 | 78 | Josh Williams | B. J. McLeod Motorsports | Chevrolet | 30.439 | 177.404 |
| 25 | 91 | Mason Massey | DGM Racing | Chevrolet | 30.443 | 177.381 |
| 26 | 31 | Myatt Snider | Jordan Anderson Racing | Chevrolet | 30.571 | 176.638 |
| 27 | 07 | Joe Graf Jr. | SS-Green Light Racing | Ford | 30.646 | 176.206 |
| 28 | 44 | Ryan Ellis | Alpha Prime Racing | Chevrolet | 30.673 | 176.051 |
| 29 | 08 | David Starr | SS-Green Light Racing | Ford | 30.683 | 175.993 |
| 30 | 35 | Patrick Emerling | Emerling-Gase Motorsports | Chevrolet | 30.723 | 175.764 |
| 31 | 6 | Ryan Vargas | JD Motorsports | Chevrolet | 30.759 | 175.558 |
| 32 | 36 | Alex Labbé | DGM Racing | Chevrolet | 30.788 | 175.393 |
| 33 | 13 | Timmy Hill (i) | MBM Motorsports | Toyota | 30.832 | 175.143 |
Qualified by owner's points
| 34 | 5 | Matt Mills | B. J. McLeod Motorsports | Chevrolet | 30.879 | 174.876 |
| 35 | 26 | Jeffrey Earnhardt | Sam Hunt Racing | Toyota | 30.891 | 174.808 |
| 36 | 38 | C. J. McLaughlin | RSS Racing | Ford | 30.894 | 174.791 |
| 37 | 23 | Anthony Alfredo | Our Motorsports | Chevrolet | - | - |
| 38 | 10 | Landon Cassill | Kaulig Racing | Chevrolet | - | - |
Failed to qualify
| 39 | 47 | Brennan Poole | Mike Harmon Racing | Chevrolet | 31.277 | 172.651 |
Official qualifying results
Official starting lineup

== Race results ==
Stage 1 Laps: 40

| Pos. | # | Driver | Team | Make | Pts |
|---|---|---|---|---|---|
| 1 | 9 | Noah Gragson | JR Motorsports | Chevrolet | 10 |
| 2 | 7 | Justin Allgaier | JR Motorsports | Chevrolet | 9 |
| 3 | 16 | A. J. Allmendinger | Kaulig Racing | Chevrolet | 8 |
| 4 | 19 | Brandon Jones | Joe Gibbs Racing | Toyota | 7 |
| 5 | 21 | Austin Hill (R) | Richard Childress Racing | Chevrolet | 6 |
| 6 | 1 | Sam Mayer | JR Motorsports | Chevrolet | 5 |
| 7 | 2 | Sheldon Creed (R) | Richard Childress Racing | Chevrolet | 4 |
| 8 | 23 | Anthony Alfredo | Our Motorsports | Chevrolet | 3 |
| 9 | 66 | J. J. Yeley | MBM Motorsports | Ford | 2 |
| 10 | 31 | Myatt Snider | Jordan Anderson Racing | Chevrolet | 1 |

Stage 2 Laps: 40

| Pos. | # | Driver | Team | Make | Pts |
|---|---|---|---|---|---|
| 1 | 8 | Josh Berry | JR Motorsports | Chevrolet | 10 |
| 2 | 7 | Justin Allgaier | JR Motorsports | Chevrolet | 9 |
| 3 | 88 | William Byron (i) | JR Motorsports | Chevrolet | 0 |
| 4 | 48 | Tyler Reddick (i) | Big Machine Racing | Chevrolet | 0 |
| 5 | 9 | Noah Gragson | JR Motorsports | Chevrolet | 6 |
| 6 | 18 | Ryan Truex | Joe Gibbs Racing | Toyota | 5 |
| 7 | 1 | Sam Mayer | JR Motorsports | Chevrolet | 4 |
| 8 | 98 | Riley Herbst | Stewart-Haas Racing | Ford | 3 |
| 9 | 21 | Austin Hill (R) | Richard Childress Racing | Chevrolet | 2 |
| 10 | 27 | Jeb Burton | Our Motorsports | Chevrolet | 1 |

Stage 3 Laps: 87

| Fin. | St | # | Driver | Team | Make | Laps | Led | Status | Points |
|---|---|---|---|---|---|---|---|---|---|
| 1 | 2 | 48 | Tyler Reddick (i) | Big Machine Racing | Chevrolet | 167 | 31 | Running | 0 |
| 2 | 15 | 88 | William Byron (i) | JR Motorsports | Chevrolet | 167 | 7 | Running | 0 |
| 3 | 9 | 1 | Sam Mayer | JR Motorsports | Chevrolet | 167 | 0 | Running | 43 |
| 4 | 6 | 7 | Justin Allgaier | JR Motorsports | Chevrolet | 167 | 33 | Running | 51 |
| 5 | 3 | 21 | Austin Hill (R) | Richard Childress Racing | Chevrolet | 167 | 16 | Running | 40 |
| 6 | 5 | 18 | Ryan Truex | Joe Gibbs Racing | Toyota | 167 | 0 | Running | 36 |
| 7 | 8 | 8 | Josh Berry | JR Motorsports | Chevrolet | 167 | 46 | Running | 40 |
| 8 | 10 | 98 | Riley Herbst | Stewart-Haas Racing | Ford | 167 | 0 | Running | 32 |
| 9 | 13 | 16 | A. J. Allmendinger | Kaulig Racing | Chevrolet | 167 | 0 | Running | 36 |
| 10 | 38 | 10 | Landon Cassill | Kaulig Racing | Chevrolet | 167 | 0 | Running | 27 |
| 11 | 11 | 11 | Daniel Hemric | Kaulig Racing | Chevrolet | 167 | 0 | Running | 26 |
| 12 | 7 | 54 | Ty Gibbs | Joe Gibbs Racing | Toyota | 167 | 0 | Running | 25 |
| 13 | 20 | 27 | Jeb Burton | Our Motorsports | Chevrolet | 167 | 0 | Running | 25 |
| 14 | 4 | 19 | Brandon Jones | Joe Gibbs Racing | Toyota | 167 | 2 | Running | 30 |
| 15 | 23 | 68 | Brandon Brown | Brandonbilt Motorsports | Chevrolet | 167 | 0 | Running | 22 |
| 16 | 19 | 51 | Jeremy Clements | Jeremy Clements Racing | Chevrolet | 167 | 0 | Running | 21 |
| 17 | 18 | 45 | Stefan Parsons | Alpha Prime Racing | Chevrolet | 167 | 0 | Running | 20 |
| 18 | 25 | 91 | Mason Massey | DGM Racing | Chevrolet | 167 | 0 | Running | 19 |
| 19 | 35 | 26 | Jeffrey Earnhardt | Sam Hunt Racing | Toyota | 167 | 0 | Running | 18 |
| 20 | 24 | 78 | Josh Williams | B. J. McLeod Motorsports | Chevrolet | 167 | 0 | Running | 17 |
| 21 | 29 | 08 | David Starr | SS-Green Light Racing | Ford | 167 | 0 | Running | 16 |
| 22 | 26 | 31 | Myatt Snider | Jordan Anderson Racing | Chevrolet | 167 | 0 | Running | 16 |
| 23 | 27 | 07 | Joe Graf Jr. | SS-Green Light Racing | Ford | 167 | 0 | Running | 14 |
| 24 | 22 | 4 | Bayley Currey | JD Motorsports | Chevrolet | 167 | 0 | Running | 13 |
| 25 | 36 | 38 | C. J. McLaughlin | RSS Racing | Ford | 166 | 0 | Running | 12 |
| 26 | 21 | 2 | Sheldon Creed (R) | Richard Childress Racing | Chevrolet | 166 | 0 | Running | 15 |
| 27 | 33 | 13 | Timmy Hill (i) | MBM Motorsports | Toyota | 166 | 0 | Running | 0 |
| 28 | 30 | 35 | Patrick Emerling | Emerling-Gase Motorsports | Chevrolet | 164 | 0 | Running | 9 |
| 29 | 16 | 02 | Brett Moffitt | Our Motorsports | Chevrolet | 148 | 0 | Track Bar | 8 |
| 30 | 28 | 44 | Ryan Ellis | Alpha Prime Racing | Chevrolet | 146 | 0 | Accident | 7 |
| 31 | 14 | 66 | J. J. Yeley | MBM Motorsports | Ford | 137 | 0 | Accident | 8 |
| 32 | 37 | 23 | Anthony Alfredo | Our Motorsports | Chevrolet | 137 | 0 | Accident | 8 |
| 33 | 32 | 36 | Alex Labbé | DGM Racing | Chevrolet | 137 | 0 | Accident | 4 |
| 34 | 17 | 34 | Jesse Iwuji (R) | Jesse Iwuji Motorsports | Chevrolet | 137 | 0 | Accident | 3 |
| 35 | 12 | 39 | Ryan Sieg | RSS Racing | Ford | 129 | 0 | Accident | 2 |
| 36 | 1 | 9 | Noah Gragson | JR Motorsports | Chevrolet | 95 | 32 | Accident | 17 |
| 37 | 34 | 5 | Matt Mills | B. J. McLeod Motorsports | Chevrolet | 87 | 0 | Accident | 1 |
| 38 | 31 | 6 | Ryan Vargas | JD Motorsports | Chevrolet | 21 | 0 | Engine | 1 |
Official race results

== Standings after the race ==
Drivers' Championship standings

| Pos | Driver | Points |
|---|---|---|
| 1 | A. J. Allmendinger | 500 |
| 2 | Noah Gragson | 456 (-44) |
| 3 | Ty Gibbs | 448 (-52) |
| 4 | Justin Allgaier | 423 (-77) |
| 5 | Josh Berry | 411 (-89) |
| 6 | Brandon Jones | 377 (-123) |
| 7 | Sam Mayer | 376 (-124) |
| 8 | Riley Herbst | 350 (-150) |
| 9 | Austin Hill | 342 (-158) |
| 10 | Landon Cassill | 326 (-174) |
| 11 | Ryan Sieg | 319 (-181) |
| 12 | Daniel Hemric | 312 (-188) |
Official driver's standings

- Note: Only the first 12 positions are included for the driver standings.

| Previous race: 2022 Mahindra ROXOR 200 | NASCAR Xfinity Series; 2022 season | Next race: 2022 Alsco Uniforms 300 (Charlotte) |
