= 2023 A-GAME 200 =

10th race of the 2023 NASCAR Xfinity Series

Race details
- Race 10 of 33 of the 2023 NASCAR Xfinity Series
- Date: April 29, 2023
- Official name: 42nd Annual A-GAME 200
- Location: Dover Motor Speedway, Dover, Delaware
- Course: Permanent racing facility
- Course length: 1 miles (1.6 km)
- Distance: 200 laps, 200 mi (321 km)
- Scheduled distance: 200 laps, 200 mi (321 km)
- Average speed: 107.191 mph (172.507 km/h)

Pole position
Driver	Parker Kligerman	Big Machine Racing
- Grid positions set by competition-based formula

Most laps led
Driver	Ryan Truex	Joe Gibbs Racing
- Laps: 124

Winner
No. 19	Ryan Truex	Joe Gibbs Racing

Television in the United States
- Network: FS1
- Announcers: Adam Alexander, Austin Dillon, and Joey Logano

Radio in the United States
- Radio: MRN

The 2023 A-GAME 200 was the 10th stock car race of the 2023 NASCAR Xfinity Series, and the 42nd iteration of the event. The race was held on Saturday, April 29, 2023, in Dover, Delaware at Dover Motor Speedway, a 1 mile (1.6 km) permanent oval-shaped racetrack. The race took the scheduled 200 laps to complete. Ryan Truex, driving for Joe Gibbs Racing, would put on a dominating performance, winning both stages and leading a race-high 124 laps, earning his first career NASCAR Xfinity Series win. To fill out the podium, Josh Berry, driving for JR Motorsports, and Justin Allgaier, also driving for JR Motorsports, would finish 2nd and 3rd, respectively.

This was also the fourth and final race of the Dash 4 Cash. The drivers eligible for the Dash 4 Cash were Cole Custer, Sheldon Creed, Jeb Burton, and Parker Kligerman, after they were the highest finishing Xfinity regulars following the race at Talladega. Custer, who finished in seventh, would claim the bonus cash.

== Background ==
Dover Motor Speedway is an oval race track in Dover, Delaware, United States that has held at least two NASCAR races since it opened in 1969. In addition to NASCAR, the track also hosted USAC and the NTT IndyCar Series. The track features one layout, a 1 mile (1.6 km) concrete oval, with 24° banking in the turns and 9° banking on the straights. The speedway is owned and operated by Speedway Motorsports.

The track, nicknamed "The Monster Mile", was built in 1969 by Melvin Joseph of Melvin L. Joseph Construction Company, Inc., with an asphalt surface, but was replaced with concrete in 1995. Six years later in 2001, the track's capacity moved to 135,000 seats, making the track have the largest capacity of sports venue in the mid-Atlantic. In 2002, the name changed to Dover International Speedway from Dover Downs International Speedway after Dover Downs Gaming and Entertainment split, making Dover Motorsports. From 2007 to 2009, the speedway worked on an improvement project called "The Monster Makeover", which expanded facilities at the track and beautified the track. After the 2014 season, the track's capacity was reduced to 95,500 seats.

=== Entry list ===
- (R) denotes rookie driver.
- (i) denotes driver who is ineligible for series driver points.

#	Driver	Team	Make
00	Cole Custer	Stewart-Haas Racing	Ford
1	Sam Mayer	JR Motorsports	Chevrolet
02	Kyle Weatherman	Our Motorsports	Chevrolet
2	Sheldon Creed	Richard Childress Racing	Chevrolet
4	Garrett Smithley	JD Motorsports	Chevrolet
6	Brennan Poole	JD Motorsports	Chevrolet
07	Stefan Parsons	SS-Green Light Racing	Chevrolet
7	Justin Allgaier	JR Motorsports	Chevrolet
08	Gray Gaulding	SS-Green Light Racing	Ford
8	Josh Berry	JR Motorsports	Chevrolet
9	Brandon Jones	JR Motorsports	Chevrolet
10	Derek Kraus	Kaulig Racing	Chevrolet
11	Daniel Hemric	Kaulig Racing	Chevrolet
16	Chandler Smith (R)	Kaulig Racing	Chevrolet
18	Sammy Smith (R)	Joe Gibbs Racing	Toyota
19	Ryan Truex	Joe Gibbs Racing	Toyota
20	John Hunter Nemechek	Joe Gibbs Racing	Toyota
21	Austin Hill	Richard Childress Racing	Chevrolet
24	Corey Heim (i)	Sam Hunt Racing	Toyota
25	Brett Moffitt	AM Racing	Ford
26	Kaz Grala	Sam Hunt Racing	Toyota
27	Jeb Burton	Jordan Anderson Racing	Chevrolet
28	Kyle Sieg	RSS Racing	Ford
31	Parker Retzlaff (R)	Jordan Anderson Racing	Chevrolet
35	Patrick Emerling	Emerling-Gase Motorsports	Chevrolet
38	Joe Graf Jr.	RSS Racing	Ford
39	Ryan Sieg	RSS Racing	Ford
43	Ryan Ellis	Alpha Prime Racing	Chevrolet
44	Jeffrey Earnhardt	Alpha Prime Racing	Chevrolet
45	Rajah Caruth (i)	Alpha Prime Racing	Chevrolet
48	Parker Kligerman	Big Machine Racing	Chevrolet
51	Jeremy Clements	Jeremy Clements Racing	Chevrolet
53	C. J. McLaughlin	Emerling-Gase Motorsports	Ford
66	Timmy Hill (i)	MBM Motorsports	Ford
74	Dawson Cram	CHK Racing	Chevrolet
78	Anthony Alfredo	B. J. McLeod Motorsports	Chevrolet
91	Chad Chastain (i)	DGM Racing	Chevrolet
92	Josh Williams	DGM Racing	Chevrolet
98	Riley Herbst	Stewart-Haas Racing	Ford
Official entry list

== Starting lineup ==
Practice and qualifying were both scheduled to be held on Friday, April 28, at 3:05 PM EST, and 3:35 PM EST, but were both cancelled due to constant rain showers. The starting lineup was determined by a performance-based metric system. As a result, Parker Kligerman, driving for Big Machine Racing, would earn the pole. Dawson Cram would fail to qualify.

Pos.	#	Driver	Team	Make
1	48	Parker Kligerman	Big Machine Racing	Chevrolet
2	00	Cole Custer	Stewart-Haas Racing	Ford
3	2	Sheldon Creed	Richard Childress Racing	Chevrolet
4	27	Jeb Burton	Jordan Anderson Racing	Chevrolet
5	31	Parker Retzlaff (R)	Jordan Anderson Racing	Chevrolet
6	21	Austin Hill	Richard Childress Racing	Chevrolet
7	92	Josh Williams	DGM Racing	Chevrolet
8	9	Brandon Jones	JR Motorsports	Chevrolet
9	6	Brennan Poole	JD Motorsports	Chevrolet
10	16	Chandler Smith (R)	Kaulig Racing	Chevrolet
11	98	Riley Herbst	Stewart-Haas Racing	Ford
12	19	Ryan Truex	Joe Gibbs Racing	Toyota
13	10	Derek Kraus	Kaulig Racing	Chevrolet
14	25	Brett Moffitt	AM Racing	Ford
15	51	Jeremy Clements	Jeremy Clements Racing	Chevrolet
16	11	Daniel Hemric	Kaulig Racing	Chevrolet
17	08	Gray Gaulding	SS-Green Light Racing	Ford
18	7	Justin Allgaier	JR Motorsports	Chevrolet
19	8	Josh Berry	JR Motorsports	Chevrolet
20	39	Ryan Sieg	RSS Racing	Ford
21	38	Joe Graf Jr.	RSS Racing	Ford
22	20	John Hunter Nemechek	Joe Gibbs Racing	Toyota
23	53	C. J. McLaughlin	Emerling-Gase Motorsports	Ford
24	1	Sam Mayer	JR Motorsports	Chevrolet
25	28	Kyle Sieg	RSS Racing	Ford
26	26	Kaz Grala	Sam Hunt Racing	Toyota
27	4	Garrett Smithley	JD Motorsports	Chevrolet
28	18	Sammy Smith (R)	Joe Gibbs Racing	Toyota
29	43	Ryan Ellis	Alpha Prime Racing	Chevrolet
30	45	Rajah Caruth (i)	Alpha Prime Racing	Chevrolet
31	78	Anthony Alfredo	B. J. McLeod Motorsports	Chevrolet
32	35	Patrick Emerling	Emerling-Gase Motorsports	Chevrolet
33	44	Jeffrey Earnhardt	Alpha Prime Racing	Chevrolet
Qualified by owner's points
34	91	Chad Chastain (i)	DGM Racing	Chevrolet
35	02	Kyle Weatherman	Our Motorsports	Chevrolet
36	24	Corey Heim (i)	Sam Hunt Racing	Toyota
37	66	Timmy Hill (i)	MBM Motorsports	Ford
38	07	Stefan Parsons	SS-Green Light Racing	Chevrolet
Failed to qualify
39	74	Dawson Cram	CHK Racing	Chevrolet
Official starting lineup

== Race results ==
Stage 1 Laps: 45

Pos.	#	Driver	Team	Make	Pts
1	19	Ryan Truex	Joe Gibbs Racing	Toyota	10
2	20	John Hunter Nemechek	Joe Gibbs Racing	Toyota	9
3	2	Sheldon Creed	Richard Childress Racing	Chevrolet	8
4	21	Austin Hill	Richard Childress Racing	Chevrolet	7
5	8	Josh Berry	JR Motorsports	Chevrolet	6
6	9	Brandon Jones	JR Motorsports	Chevrolet	5
7	18	Sammy Smith (R)	Joe Gibbs Racing	Toyota	4
8	00	Cole Custer	Stewart-Haas Racing	Ford	3
9	11	Daniel Hemric	Kaulig Racing	Chevrolet	2
10	16	Chandler Smith (R)	Kaulig Racing	Chevrolet	1

Stage 2 Laps: 45

Pos.	#	Driver	Team	Make	Pts
1	19	Ryan Truex	Joe Gibbs Racing	Toyota	10
2	21	Austin Hill	Richard Childress Racing	Chevrolet	9
3	20	John Hunter Nemechek	Joe Gibbs Racing	Toyota	8
4	7	Justin Allgaier	JR Motorsports	Chevrolet	7
5	00	Cole Custer	Stewart-Haas Racing	Ford	6
6	16	Chandler Smith (R)	Kaulig Racing	Chevrolet	5
7	2	Sheldon Creed	Richard Childress Racing	Chevrolet	4
8	18	Sammy Smith (R)	Joe Gibbs Racing	Toyota	3
9	1	Sam Mayer	JR Motorsports	Chevrolet	2
10	11	Daniel Hemric	Kaulig Racing	Chevrolet	1

Stage 3 Laps: 110

Fin	St	#	Driver	Team	Make	Laps	Led	Status	Pts
1	12	19	Ryan Truex	Joe Gibbs Racing	Toyota	200	124	Running	60
2	19	8	Josh Berry	JR Motorsports	Chevrolet	200	0	Running	42
3	18	7	Justin Allgaier	JR Motorsports	Chevrolet	200	0	Running	41
4	6	21	Austin Hill	Richard Childress Racing	Chevrolet	200	18	Running	49
5	22	20	John Hunter Nemechek	Joe Gibbs Racing	Toyota	200	0	Running	49
6	28	18	Sammy Smith (R)	Joe Gibbs Racing	Toyota	200	0	Running	38
7	2	00	Cole Custer	Stewart-Haas Racing	Ford	200	13	Running	39
8	8	9	Brandon Jones	JR Motorsports	Chevrolet	200	0	Running	34
9	24	1	Sam Mayer	JR Motorsports	Chevrolet	200	0	Running	30
10	16	11	Daniel Hemric	Kaulig Racing	Chevrolet	200	0	Running	29
11	3	2	Sheldon Creed	Richard Childress Racing	Chevrolet	199	41	Running	38
12	26	26	Kaz Grala	Sam Hunt Racing	Toyota	199	0	Running	25
13	10	16	Chandler Smith (R)	Kaulig Racing	Chevrolet	199	0	Running	30
14	35	02	Kyle Weatherman	Our Motorsports	Chevrolet	199	4	Running	23
15	14	25	Brett Moffitt	AM Racing	Ford	199	0	Running	22
16	20	39	Ryan Sieg	RSS Racing	Ford	199	0	Running	21
17	5	31	Parker Retzlaff (R)	Jordan Anderson Racing	Chevrolet	199	0	Running	20
18	4	27	Jeb Burton	Jordan Anderson Racing	Chevrolet	198	0	Running	19
19	15	51	Jeremy Clements	Jeremy Clements Racing	Chevrolet	198	0	Running	18
20	13	10	Derek Kraus	Kaulig Racing	Chevrolet	198	0	Running	17
21	11	98	Riley Herbst	Stewart-Haas Racing	Ford	198	0	Running	16
22	21	38	Joe Graf Jr.	RSS Racing	Ford	198	0	Running	15
23	7	92	Josh Williams	DGM Racing	Chevrolet	198	0	Running	14
24	9	6	Brennan Poole	JD Motorsports	Chevrolet	197	0	Running	13
25	29	43	Ryan Ellis	Alpha Prime Racing	Chevrolet	197	0	Running	12
26	30	45	Rajah Caruth (i)	Alpha Prime Racing	Chevrolet	196	0	Running	0
27	17	08	Gray Gaulding	SS-Green Light Racing	Ford	196	0	Running	10
28	38	07	Stefan Parsons	SS-Green Light Racing	Chevrolet	196	0	Running	9
29	25	28	Kyle Sieg	RSS Racing	Ford	195	0	Running	8
30	37	66	Timmy Hill (i)	MBM Motorsports	Ford	195	0	Running	0
31	27	4	Garrett Smithley	JD Motorsports	Chevrolet	195	0	Running	6
32	34	91	Chad Chastain (i)	DGM Racing	Chevrolet	193	0	Running	0
33	32	35	Patrick Emerling	Emerling-Gase Motorsports	Chevrolet	192	0	Running	4
34	23	53	C. J. McLaughlin	Emerling-Gase Motorsports	Ford	192	0	Running	3
35	36	24	Corey Heim (i)	Sam Hunt Racing	Toyota	170	0	Engine	0
36	31	78	Anthony Alfredo	B. J. McLeod Motorsports	Chevrolet	123	0	Brakes	1
37	33	44	Jeffrey Earnhardt	Alpha Prime Racing	Chevrolet	119	0	Engine	1
38	1	48	Parker Kligerman	Big Machine Racing	Chevrolet	62	0	Accident	1
Official race results

== Standings after the race ==
Drivers' Championship standings

	Pos	Driver	Points
	1	Austin Hill	377
	2	John Hunter Nemechek	373 (-4)
	3	Chandler Smith	339 (–38)
1	4	Josh Berry	334 (–43)
1	5	Justin Allgaier	328 (–49)
1	6	Cole Custer	318 (–59)
1	7	Sheldon Creed	314 (–63)
4	8	Riley Herbst	312 (–65)
	9	Sammy Smith	296 (–81)
	10	Daniel Hemric	284 (–93)
1	11	Sam Mayer	267 (–110)
2	12	Brandon Jones	258 (–119)
Official driver's standings

- Note: Only the first 12 positions are included for the driver standings.

Previous race: 2023 Ag-Pro 300	NASCAR Xfinity Series; 2023 season	Next race: 2023 Shriners Children's 200
