= 2023 Alsco Uniforms 300 (Charlotte) =

11th race of the 2023 NASCAR Xfinity Series

Race details
- Race 12 of 33 of the 2023 NASCAR Xfinity Series
- Date: May 29, 2023
- Official name: 42nd Annual Alsco Uniforms 300
- Location: Charlotte Motor Speedway, Concord, North Carolina
- Course: Permanent racing facility
- Course length: 1.5 miles (2.4 km)
- Distance: 200 laps, 300 mi (480 km)
- Scheduled distance: 200 laps, 300 mi (480 km)
- Average speed: 122.532 mph (197.196 km/h)

Pole position
Driver	Justin Allgaier	JR Motorsports
- Time: 29.806

Most laps led
Driver	Justin Allgaier	JR Motorsports
- Laps: 83

Winner
No. 7	Justin Allgaier	JR Motorsports

Television in the United States
- Network: FS2
- Announcers: Adam Alexander, Jamie McMurray, and Michael Waltrip

Radio in the United States
- Radio: PRN

The 2023 Alsco Uniforms 300 was the 12th stock car race of the 2023 NASCAR Xfinity Series, and the 42nd iteration of the event. The race was held in Concord, North Carolina at Charlotte Motor Speedway, a 1.5 miles (2.4 km) tri-oval shaped racetrack. It was originally scheduled to be held on Saturday, May 27, 2023, but due to constant rain showers, the race was postponed until Monday, May 29, immediately following the Coca-Cola 600 Cup Series race on the same day. The race took the scheduled 200 laps to complete. Justin Allgaier, driving for JR Motorsports, was able to stretch out his fuel mileage during the final 20 laps, and earn his 20th career NASCAR Xfinity Series win, and his first of the season. Allgaier dominated the majority of the race as well, leading a race-high 83 laps. To fill out the podium, John Hunter Nemechek, driving for Joe Gibbs Racing, and Cole Custer, driving for Stewart-Haas Racing, would finish 2nd and 3rd, respectively.

== Background ==
Charlotte Motor Speedway (previously known as Lowe's Motor Speedway from 1999 to 2009) is a motorsport complex located in Concord, North Carolina, 13-mile (21 km) outside Charlotte. The complex features a 1.500 mi (2.414 km) quad oval track that hosts NASCAR racing including the prestigious Coca-Cola 600 on Memorial Day weekend, and the Bank of America Roval 400. The speedway was built in 1959 by Bruton Smith and is considered the home track for NASCAR with many race teams located in the Charlotte area. The track is owned and operated by Speedway Motorsports with Greg Walter as track president.

The 2,000 acres (8.1 km^{2}) complex also features a state-of-the-art 0.250 mi (0.402 km) drag racing strip, ZMAX Dragway. It is the only all-concrete, four-lane drag strip in the United States and hosts NHRA events. Alongside the drag strip is a state-of-the-art clay oval that hosts dirt racing including the World of Outlaws finals among other popular racing events.

=== Entry list ===
- (R) denotes rookie driver.
- (i) denotes driver who is ineligible for series driver points.

#	Driver	Team	Make
00	Cole Custer	Stewart-Haas Racing	Ford
1	Sam Mayer	JR Motorsports	Chevrolet
02	Blaine Perkins (R)	Our Motorsports	Chevrolet
2	Sheldon Creed	Richard Childress Racing	Chevrolet
4	Garrett Smithley	JD Motorsports	Chevrolet
6	Brennan Poole	JD Motorsports	Chevrolet
07	Stefan Parsons	SS-Green Light Racing	Chevrolet
7	Justin Allgaier	JR Motorsports	Chevrolet
08	Natalie Decker	SS-Green Light Racing	Chevrolet
8	Josh Berry	JR Motorsports	Chevrolet
9	Brandon Jones	JR Motorsports	Chevrolet
10	Justin Haley (i) (Note: Kyle Busch was originally scheduled to the drive the 10 car for Kaulig Racing at Charlotte, but due to the Xfinity race being postponed to the same day as the Cup race, Justin Haley took over the 10 car for the race. Busch practiced and qualified the car before Haley took over.)	Kaulig Racing	Chevrolet
11	Daniel Hemric	Kaulig Racing	Chevrolet
16	Chandler Smith (R)	Kaulig Racing	Chevrolet
18	Sammy Smith (R)	Joe Gibbs Racing	Toyota
19	Ty Gibbs (i)	Joe Gibbs Racing	Toyota
20	John Hunter Nemechek	Joe Gibbs Racing	Toyota
21	Austin Hill	Richard Childress Racing	Chevrolet
24	Connor Mosack (R)	Sam Hunt Racing	Toyota
25	Brett Moffitt	AM Racing	Ford
26	Kaz Grala	Sam Hunt Racing	Toyota
27	Jeb Burton	Jordan Anderson Racing	Chevrolet
28	Kyle Sieg	RSS Racing	Ford
31	Parker Retzlaff (R)	Jordan Anderson Racing	Chevrolet
35	Patrick Emerling	Emerling-Gase Motorsports	Chevrolet
38	Joe Graf Jr.	RSS Racing	Ford
39	Ryan Sieg	RSS Racing	Ford
43	Ryan Ellis	Alpha Prime Racing	Chevrolet
44	Rajah Caruth (i)	Alpha Prime Racing	Chevrolet
45	Jeffrey Earnhardt	Alpha Prime Racing	Chevrolet
48	Parker Kligerman	Big Machine Racing	Chevrolet
51	Jeremy Clements	Jeremy Clements Racing	Chevrolet
53	C. J. McLaughlin	Emerling-Gase Motorsports	Ford
66	Timmy Hill (i)	MBM Motorsports	Toyota
74	Dawson Cram	CHK Racing	Chevrolet
77	Carson Hocevar (i)	Spire Motorsports	Chevrolet
78	Anthony Alfredo	B. J. McLeod Motorsports	Chevrolet
91	Kyle Weatherman	DGM Racing	Chevrolet
92	Josh Williams	DGM Racing	Chevrolet
98	Riley Herbst	Stewart-Haas Racing	Ford
Official entry list

== Practice ==
The first and only practice session was held on Friday, May 26, at 3:35 PM EST, and would last for 20 minutes. John Hunter Nemechek, driving for Joe Gibbs Racing, would set the fastest time in the session, with a lap of 30.159, and an average speed of 179.051 mph (288.155 km/h).

Pos.	#	Driver	Team	Make	Time	Speed
1	20	John Hunter Nemechek	Joe Gibbs Racing	Toyota	30.159	179.051
2	19	Ty Gibbs (i)	Joe Gibbs Racing	Toyota	30.160	179.045
3	7	Justin Allgaier	JR Motorsports	Chevrolet	30.258	178.465
Full practice results

== Qualifying ==
Qualifying was held on Friday, May 26, at 4:05 PM EST. Since Charlotte Motor Speedway is an intermediate racetrack, the qualifying system used is a single-car, one-lap system with only one round. In that round, whoever sets the fastest time will win the pole. Justin Allgaier, driving for JR Motorsports, would score the pole for the race, with a lap of 29.806, and an average speed of 181.172 mph (291.568 km/h).

Pos.	#	Driver	Team	Make	Time	Speed
1	7	Justin Allgaier	JR Motorsports	Chevrolet	29.806	181.172
2	20	John Hunter Nemechek	Joe Gibbs Racing	Toyota	29.959	180.246
3	19	Ty Gibbs (i)	Joe Gibbs Racing	Toyota	29.962	180.228
4	00	Cole Custer	Stewart-Haas Racing	Ford	30.010	179.940
5	9	Brandon Jones	JR Motorsports	Chevrolet	30.158	179.057
6	10	Kyle Busch (i)	Kaulig Racing	Chevrolet	30.197	178.826
7	2	Sheldon Creed	Richard Childress Racing	Chevrolet	30.238	178.583
8	1	Sam Mayer	JR Motorsports	Chevrolet	30.243	178.554
9	27	Jeb Burton	Jordan Anderson Racing	Chevrolet	30.244	178.548
10	16	Chandler Smith (R)	Kaulig Racing	Chevrolet	30.263	178.436
11	11	Daniel Hemric	Kaulig Racing	Chevrolet	30.275	178.365
12	25	Brett Moffitt	AM Racing	Ford	30.326	178.065
13	98	Riley Herbst	Stewart-Haas Racing	Ford	30.351	177.918
14	8	Josh Berry	JR Motorsports	Chevrolet	30.371	177.801
15	77	Carson Hocevar (i)	Spire Motorsports	Chevrolet	30.379	177.754
16	78	Anthony Alfredo	B. J. McLeod Motorsports	Chevrolet	30.385	177.719
17	21	Austin Hill	Richard Childress Racing	Chevrolet	30.433	177.439
18	18	Sammy Smith (R)	Joe Gibbs Racing	Toyota	30.453	177.322
19	44	Rajah Caruth (i)	Alpha Prime Racing	Chevrolet	30.472	177.212
20	48	Parker Kligerman	Big Machine Racing	Chevrolet	30.532	176.864
21	91	Kyle Weatherman	DGM Racing	Chevrolet	30.556	176.725
22	07	Stefan Parsons	SS-Green Light Racing	Chevrolet	30.832	175.143
23	38	Joe Graf Jr.	RSS Racing	Ford	30.867	174.944
24	28	Kyle Sieg	RSS Racing	Ford	30.886	174.836
25	24	Connor Mosack (R)	Sam Hunt Racing	Toyota	30.921	174.639
26	74	Dawson Cram	CHK Racing	Chevrolet	31.034	174.003
27	51	Jeremy Clements	Jeremy Clements Racing	Chevrolet	31.107	173.594
28	4	Garrett Smithley	JD Motorsports	Chevrolet	31.134	173.444
29	92	Josh Williams	DGM Racing	Chevrolet	31.164	173.277
30	43	Ryan Ellis	Alpha Prime Racing	Chevrolet	31.305	172.496
31	6	Brennan Poole	JD Motorsports	Chevrolet	31.312	172.458
32	26	Kaz Grala	Sam Hunt Racing	Toyota	31.336	172.326
33	08	Natalie Decker	SS-Green Light Racing	Chevrolet	31.382	172.073
Qualified by owner's points
34	35	Patrick Emerling	Emerling-Gase Motorsports	Chevrolet	31.605	170.859
35	02	Blaine Perkins (R)	Our Motorsports	Chevrolet	31.660	170.562
36	39	Ryan Sieg	RSS Racing	Ford	–	–
37	31	Parker Retzlaff (R)	Jordan Anderson Racing	Chevrolet	–	–
38	45	Jeffrey Earnhardt	Alpha Prime Racing	Chevrolet	–	–
Failed to qualify
39	66	Timmy Hill (i)	MBM Motorsports	Toyota	31.738	170.143
40	53	C. J. McLaughlin	Emerling-Gase Motorsports	Ford	31.775	169.945
Official qualifying results
Official starting lineup

== Race results ==
Stage 1 Laps: 45

Pos.	#	Driver	Team	Make	Pts
1	19	Ty Gibbs (i)	Joe Gibbs Racing	Toyota	0
2	20	John Hunter Nemechek	Joe Gibbs Racing	Toyota	9
3	7	Justin Allgaier	JR Motorsports	Chevrolet	8
4	11	Daniel Hemric	Kaulig Racing	Chevrolet	7
5	2	Sheldon Creed	Richard Childress Racing	Chevrolet	6
6	16	Chandler Smith (R)	Kaulig Racing	Chevrolet	5
7	21	Austin Hill	Richard Childress Racing	Chevrolet	4
8	8	Josh Berry	JR Motorsports	Chevrolet	3
9	00	Cole Custer	Stewart-Haas Racing	Ford	2
10	98	Riley Herbst	Stewart-Haas Racing	Ford	1

Stage 2 Laps: 45

Pos.	#	Driver	Team	Make	Pts
1	19	Ty Gibbs (i)	Joe Gibbs Racing	Toyota	0
2	20	John Hunter Nemechek	Joe Gibbs Racing	Toyota	9
3	7	Justin Allgaier	JR Motorsports	Chevrolet	8
4	21	Austin Hill	Richard Childress Racing	Chevrolet	7
5	2	Sheldon Creed	Richard Childress Racing	Chevrolet	6
6	16	Chandler Smith (R)	Kaulig Racing	Chevrolet	5
7	1	Sam Mayer	JR Motorsports	Chevrolet	4
8	9	Brandon Jones	JR Motorsports	Chevrolet	3
9	00	Cole Custer	Stewart-Haas Racing	Ford	2
10	77	Carson Hocevar (i)	Spire Motorsports	Chevrolet	0

Stage 3 Laps: 110

Pos.	St	#	Driver	Team	Make	Laps	Led	Status	Pts
1	1	7	Justin Allgaier	JR Motorsports	Chevrolet	200	83	Running	56
2	2	20	John Hunter Nemechek	Joe Gibbs Racing	Toyota	200	57	Running	53
3	4	00	Cole Custer	Stewart-Haas Racing	Ford	200	0	Running	38
4	17	21	Austin Hill	Richard Childress Racing	Chevrolet	200	0	Running	44
5	3	19	Ty Gibbs (i)	Joe Gibbs Racing	Toyota	200	52	Running	0
6	37	31	Parker Retzlaff (R)	Jordan Anderson Racing	Chevrolet	200	0	Running	31
7	9	27	Jeb Burton	Jordan Anderson Racing	Chevrolet	200	0	Running	30
8	15	77	Carson Hocevar (i)	Spire Motorsports	Chevrolet	199	0	Running	0
9	5	9	Brandon Jones	JR Motorsports	Chevrolet	199	0	Running	31
10	18	18	Sammy Smith (R)	Joe Gibbs Racing	Toyota	199	0	Running	27
11	24	28	Kyle Sieg	RSS Racing	Ford	199	0	Running	26
12	6	10	Justin Haley (i)	Kaulig Racing	Chevrolet	199	0	Running	0
13	10	16	Chandler Smith (R)	Kaulig Racing	Chevrolet	199	0	Running	34
14	13	98	Riley Herbst	Stewart-Haas Racing	Ford	199	0	Running	24
15	14	8	Josh Berry	JR Motorsports	Chevrolet	199	0	Running	25
16	32	26	Kaz Grala	Sam Hunt Racing	Toyota	199	0	Running	21
17	23	38	Joe Graf Jr.	RSS Racing	Ford	199	0	Running	20
18	29	92	Josh Williams	DGM Racing	Chevrolet	199	0	Running	19
19	27	51	Jeremy Clements	Jeremy Clements Racing	Chevrolet	198	0	Running	18
20	21	91	Kyle Weatherman	DGM Racing	Chevrolet	198	0	Running	17
21	38	45	Jeffrey Earnhardt	Alpha Prime Racing	Chevrolet	198	0	Running	16
22	11	11	Daniel Hemric	Kaulig Racing	Chevrolet	198	0	Running	15
23	25	24	Connor Mosack (R)	Sam Hunt Racing	Toyota	198	0	Running	14
24	36	39	Ryan Sieg	RSS Racing	Ford	198	8	Running	13
25	19	44	Rajah Caruth (i)	Alpha Prime Racing	Chevrolet	197	0	Running	0
26	22	07	Stefan Parsons	SS-Green Light Racing	Chevrolet	197	0	Running	11
27	30	43	Ryan Ellis	Alpha Prime Racing	Chevrolet	197	0	Running	10
28	7	2	Sheldon Creed	Richard Childress Racing	Chevrolet	197	0	Running	21
29	12	25	Brett Moffitt	AM Racing	Ford	197	0	Running	8
30	31	6	Brennan Poole	JD Motorsports	Chevrolet	197	0	Running	7
31	34	35	Patrick Emerling	Emerling-Gase Motorsports	Chevrolet	195	0	Running	6
32	16	78	Anthony Alfredo	B. J. McLeod Motorsports	Chevrolet	195	0	Running	5
33	28	4	Garrett Smithley	JD Motorsports	Chevrolet	195	0	Running	4
34	33	08	Natalie Decker	SS-Green Light Racing	Chevrolet	195	0	Running	3
35	8	1	Sam Mayer	JR Motorsports	Chevrolet	193	0	Running	6
36	26	74	Dawson Cram	CHK Racing	Chevrolet	193	0	Running	1
37	35	02	Blaine Perkins (R)	Our Motorsports	Chevrolet	163	0	Engine	1
38	20	48	Parker Kligerman	Big Machine Racing	Chevrolet	144	0	Running	1
Official race results

== Standings after the race ==
Drivers' Championship standings

	Pos	Driver	Points
	1	John Hunter Nemechek	477
	2	Austin Hill	467 (-10)
	3	Justin Allgaier	427 (–50)
'1	4	Cole Custer	403 (–74)
1	5	Josh Berry	392 (–85)
	6	Chandler Smith	374 (–103)
	7	Sheldon Creed	351 (–126)
	8	Sammy Smith	350 (–127)
	9	Riley Herbst	337 (–140)
1	10	Daniel Hemric	329 (–148)
1	11	Sam Mayer	315 (–162)
1	12	Jeb Burton	303 (–174)
Official driver's standings

- Note: Only the first 12 positions are included for the driver standings.

Previous race: 2023 Shriners Children's 200	NASCAR Xfinity Series; 2023 season	Next race: 2023 Pacific Office Automation 147
