= 2023 Ambetter Health 200 =

18th race of the 2023 NASCAR Xfinity Series

Race details
- Race 18 of 33 of the 2023 NASCAR Xfinity Series
- Date: July 15, 2023
- Official name: 29th Annual Ambetter Health 200
- Location: New Hampshire Motor Speedway, Loudon, New Hampshire
- Course: Permanent racing facility
- Course length: 1.058 miles (1.703 km)
- Distance: 206 laps, 218 mi (350 km)
- Scheduled distance: 200 laps, 211 mi (340 km)
- Average speed: 82.417 mph (132.637 km/h)

Pole position
Driver	Chandler Smith	Kaulig Racing
- Time: 30.159

Most laps led
Driver	John Hunter Nemechek	Joe Gibbs Racing
- Laps: 137

Winner
No. 20	John Hunter Nemechek	Joe Gibbs Racing

Television in the United States
- Network: USA
- Announcers: Rick Allen, Jeff Burton and Steve Letarte

Radio in the United States
- Radio: PRN

The 2023 Ambetter Health 200 was the 18th stock car race of the 2023 NASCAR Xfinity Series, and the 29th iteration of the event. The race was held on Saturday, July 15, 2023, in Loudon, New Hampshire at New Hampshire Motor Speedway, a 1.058 miles (1.703 km) permanent oval shaped racetrack. The race was originally scheduled to be contested over 200 laps, but was extended to 206 laps due to a NASCAR overtime finish. John Hunter Nemechek, driving for Joe Gibbs Racing, would put on a dominating performance, leading a race-high 137 laps, and winning the race after leading when the caution came out on the final lap. This was Nemechek's sixth career NASCAR Xfinity Series win, and his fourth of the season. To fill out the podium, Chandler Smith, driving for Kaulig Racing, and Austin Hill, driving for Richard Childress Racing, would finish 2nd and 3rd, respectively.

== Background ==
New Hampshire Motor Speedway is a 1.058-mile (1.703 km) oval speedway located in Loudon, New Hampshire, which America, the Loudon Classic. Nicknamed "The Magic Mile", the speedway is often converted into a 1.6-mile (2.6 km) road has hosted NASCAR racing annually since the early 1990s, as well as the longest-running motorcycle race in North course, which includes much of the oval.

The track was originally the site of Bryar Motorsports Park before being purchased and redeveloped by Bob Bahre. The track is currently one of eight major NASCAR tracks owned and operated by Speedway Motorsports.

=== Entry list ===
- (R) denotes rookie driver.
- (i) denotes driver who is ineligible for series driver points.

#	Driver	Team	Make
00	Cole Custer	Stewart-Haas Racing	Ford
1	Sam Mayer	JR Motorsports	Chevrolet
02	Blaine Perkins (R)	Our Motorsports	Chevrolet
2	Sheldon Creed	Richard Childress Racing	Chevrolet
4	Kyle Weatherman	JD Motorsports	Chevrolet
6	Brennan Poole	JD Motorsports	Chevrolet
07	Stefan Parsons	SS-Green Light Racing	Chevrolet
7	Justin Allgaier	JR Motorsports	Chevrolet
08	Mason Massey	SS-Green Light Racing	Ford
8	Josh Berry	JR Motorsports	Chevrolet
9	Brandon Jones	JR Motorsports	Chevrolet
10	Austin Dillon (i)	Kaulig Racing	Chevrolet
11	Daniel Hemric	Kaulig Racing	Chevrolet
16	Chandler Smith (R)	Kaulig Racing	Chevrolet
18	Sammy Smith (R)	Joe Gibbs Racing	Toyota
19	Joe Graf Jr.	Joe Gibbs Racing	Toyota
20	John Hunter Nemechek	Joe Gibbs Racing	Toyota
21	Austin Hill	Richard Childress Racing	Chevrolet
24	Connor Mosack (R)	Sam Hunt Racing	Toyota
25	Brett Moffitt	AM Racing	Ford
26	Kaz Grala	Sam Hunt Racing	Toyota
27	Jeb Burton	Jordan Anderson Racing	Chevrolet
28	Kyle Sieg	RSS Racing	Ford
31	Parker Retzlaff (R)	Jordan Anderson Racing	Chevrolet
35	Patrick Emerling	Emerling-Gase Motorsports	Chevrolet
38	Chris Hacker (i)	RSS Racing	Ford
39	Ryan Sieg	RSS Racing	Ford
43	Ryan Ellis	Alpha Prime Racing	Chevrolet
44	Rajah Caruth (i)	Alpha Prime Racing	Chevrolet
45	Greg Van Alst	Alpha Prime Racing	Chevrolet
48	Parker Kligerman	Big Machine Racing	Chevrolet
51	Jeremy Clements	Jeremy Clements Racing	Chevrolet
53	C. J. McLaughlin	Emerling-Gase Motorsports	Chevrolet
66	Chad Finchum	MBM Motorsports	Ford
78	Anthony Alfredo	B. J. McLeod Motorsports	Chevrolet
91	Alex Labbé	DGM Racing	Chevrolet
92	Josh Williams	DGM Racing	Chevrolet
98	Riley Herbst	Stewart-Haas Racing	Ford
Official entry list

== Practice ==
The first and only practice session was held on Friday, July 14, at 5:05 PM EST, and would last for 20 minutes. Sammy Smith, driving for Joe Gibbs Racing, would set the fastest time in the session, with a lap of 30.834, and an average speed of 123.526 mph (198.796 km/h).

Pos.	#	Driver	Team	Make	Time	Speed
1	18	Sammy Smith (R)	Joe Gibbs Racing	Toyota	30.834	123.526
2	00	Cole Custer	Stewart-Haas Racing	Ford	30.879	123.346
3	19	Joe Graf Jr.	Joe Gibbs Racing	Toyota	30.895	123.282
Full practice results

== Qualifying ==
Qualifying was held on Friday, July 14, at 5:35 PM EST. Since New Hampshire Motor Speedway is a mile oval, the qualifying system used is a single-car, one-lap system with only one round. In that round, whoever sets the fastest time will win the pole. Chandler Smith, driving for Kaulig Racing, would score the pole for the race, with a lap of 30.159, and an average speed of 126.291 mph (203.246 km/h).

Pos.	#	Driver	Team	Make	Time	Speed
1	16	Chandler Smith (R)	Kaulig Racing	Chevrolet	30.159	126.291
2	20	John Hunter Nemechek	Joe Gibbs Racing	Toyota	30.199	126.123
3	8	Josh Berry	JR Motorsports	Chevrolet	30.313	125.649
4	7	Justin Allgaier	JR Motorsports	Chevrolet	30.337	125.550
5	9	Brandon Jones	JR Motorsports	Chevrolet	30.356	125.471
6	00	Cole Custer	Stewart-Haas Racing	Ford	30.368	125.421
7	18	Sammy Smith (R)	Joe Gibbs Racing	Toyota	30.470	125.002
8	21	Austin Hill	Richard Childress Racing	Chevrolet	30.500	124.879
9	10	Austin Dillon (i)	Kaulig Racing	Chevrolet	30.518	124.805
10	1	Sam Mayer	JR Motorsports	Chevrolet	30.589	124.515
11	11	Daniel Hemric	Kaulig Racing	Chevrolet	30.596	124.487
12	25	Brett Moffitt	AM Racing	Ford	30.615	124.410
13	31	Parker Retzlaff (R)	Jordan Anderson Racing	Chevrolet	30.622	124.381
14	98	Riley Herbst	Stewart-Haas Racing	Ford	30.647	124.280
15	48	Parker Kligerman	Big Machine Racing	Chevrolet	30.659	124.231
16	51	Jeremy Clements	Jeremy Clements Racing	Chevrolet	30.666	124.203
17	2	Sheldon Creed	Richard Childress Racing	Chevrolet	30.759	123.827
18	78	Anthony Alfredo	B. J. McLeod Motorsports	Chevrolet	30.771	123.779
19	19	Joe Graf Jr.	Joe Gibbs Racing	Toyota	30.795	123.682
20	27	Jeb Burton	Jordan Anderson Racing	Chevrolet	30.822	123.574
21	91	Alex Labbé	DGM Racing	Chevrolet	30.888	123.310
22	92	Josh Williams	DGM Racing	Chevrolet	31.007	122.837
23	4	Kyle Weatherman	JD Motorsports	Chevrolet	31.091	122.505
24	6	Brennan Poole	JD Motorsports	Chevrolet	31.158	122.241
25	24	Connor Mosack (R)	Sam Hunt Racing	Toyota	31.198	122.085
26	28	Kyle Sieg	RSS Racing	Ford	31.266	121.819
27	44	Rajah Caruth (i)	Alpha Prime Racing	Chevrolet	31.279	121.769
28	35	Patrick Emerling	Emerling-Gase Motorsports	Chevrolet	31.282	121.757
29	43	Ryan Ellis	Alpha Prime Racing	Chevrolet	31.304	121.671
30	07	Stefan Parsons	SS-Green Light Racing	Chevrolet	31.347	121.504
31	38	Chris Hacker (i)	RSS Racing	Ford	31.353	121.481
32	02	Blaine Perkins (R)	Our Motorsports	Chevrolet	31.472	121.022
33	08	Mason Massey	SS-Green Light Racing	Ford	31.514	120.861
Qualified by owner's points
34	66	Chad Finchum	MBM Motorsports	Ford	32.021	118.947
35	53	C. J. McLaughlin	Emerling-Gase Motorsports	Chevrolet	32.967	115.534
36	45	Greg Van Alst	Alpha Prime Racing	Chevrolet	33.310	114.344
37	39	Ryan Sieg	RSS Racing	Ford	–	–
38	26	Kaz Grala	Sam Hunt Racing	Toyota	–	–
Official qualifying results
Official starting lineup

== Race results ==
Stage 1 Laps: 45

Pos.	#	Driver	Team	Make	Pts
1	7	Justin Allgaier	JR Motorsports	Chevrolet	10
2	20	John Hunter Nemechek	Joe Gibbs Racing	Toyota	9
3	00	Cole Custer	Stewart-Haas Racing	Ford	8
4	16	Chandler Smith (R)	Kaulig Racing	Chevrolet	7
5	8	Josh Berry	JR Motorsports	Chevrolet	6
6	9	Brandon Jones	JR Motorsports	Chevrolet	5
7	10	Austin Dillon (i)	Kaulig Racing	Chevrolet	0
8	1	Sam Mayer	JR Motorsports	Chevrolet	3
9	11	Daniel Hemric	Kaulig Racing	Chevrolet	2
10	21	Austin Hill	Richard Childress Racing	Chevrolet	1

Stage 2 Laps: 45

Pos.	#	Driver	Team	Make	Pts
1	18	Sammy Smith (R)	Joe Gibbs Racing	Toyota	10
2	31	Parker Retzlaff (R)	Jordan Anderson Racing	Chevrolet	9
3	2	Sheldon Creed	Richard Childress Racing	Chevrolet	8
4	9	Brandon Jones	JR Motorsports	Chevrolet	7
5	92	Josh Williams	DGM Racing	Chevrolet	6
6	7	Justin Allgaier	JR Motorsports	Chevrolet	5
7	19	Joe Graf Jr.	Joe Gibbs Racing	Toyota	4
8	20	John Hunter Nemechek	Joe Gibbs Racing	Toyota	3
9	10	Austin Dillon (i)	Kaulig Racing	Chevrolet	0
10	16	Chandler Smith (R)	Kaulig Racing	Chevrolet	1

Stage 3 Laps: 116

Pos.	St	#	Driver	Team	Make	Laps	Led	Status	Pts
1	2	20	John Hunter Nemechek	Joe Gibbs Racing	Toyota	206	137	Running	52
2	1	16	Chandler Smith (R)	Kaulig Racing	Chevrolet	206	10	Running	43
3	8	21	Austin Hill	Richard Childress Racing	Chevrolet	206	0	Running	35
4	11	11	Daniel Hemric	Kaulig Racing	Chevrolet	206	0	Running	35
5	7	18	Sammy Smith (R)	Joe Gibbs Racing	Toyota	206	18	Running	42
6	4	7	Justin Allgaier	JR Motorsports	Chevrolet	206	27	Running	46
7	20	27	Jeb Burton	Jordan Anderson Racing	Chevrolet	206	0	Running	30
8	22	92	Josh Williams	DGM Racing	Chevrolet	206	0	Running	35
9	12	25	Brett Moffitt	AM Racing	Ford	206	0	Running	28
10	33	08	Mason Massey	SS-Green Light Racing	Ford	206	0	Running	27
11	5	9	Brandon Jones	JR Motorsports	Chevrolet	206	0	Running	38
12	21	91	Alex Labbé	DGM Racing	Chevrolet	206	0	Running	25
13	38	26	Kaz Grala	Sam Hunt Racing	Toyota	206	0	Running	24
14	28	35	Patrick Emerling	Emerling-Gase Motorsports	Chevrolet	206	0	Running	23
15	16	51	Jeremy Clements	Jeremy Clements Racing	Chevrolet	206	0	Running	22
16	9	10	Austin Dillon (i)	Kaulig Racing	Chevrolet	206	4	Running	0
17	3	8	Josh Berry	JR Motorsports	Chevrolet	206	0	Running	26
18	10	1	Sam Mayer	JR Motorsports	Chevrolet	206	0	Running	22
19	29	43	Ryan Ellis	Alpha Prime Racing	Chevrolet	206	0	Running	18
20	14	98	Riley Herbst	Stewart-Haas Racing	Ford	206	0	Running	17
21	17	2	Sheldon Creed	Richard Childress Racing	Chevrolet	205	0	Running	24
22	6	00	Cole Custer	Stewart-Haas Racing	Ford	205	0	Running	23
23	26	28	Kyle Sieg	RSS Racing	Ford	205	0	Running	14
24	24	6	Brennan Poole	JD Motorsports	Chevrolet	204	0	Running	13
25	32	02	Blaine Perkins (R)	Our Motorsports	Chevrolet	203	0	Running	12
26	25	24	Connor Mosack (R)	Sam Hunt Racing	Toyota	203	0	Running	11
27	23	4	Kyle Weatherman	JD Motorsports	Chevrolet	202	0	Running	10
28	35	53	C. J. McLaughlin	Emerling-Gase Motorsports	Chevrolet	201	0	Running	9
29	19	19	Joe Graf Jr.	Joe Gibbs Racing	Toyota	196	8	Accident	12
30	31	38	Chris Hacker (i)	RSS Racing	Ford	195	0	Running	0
31	13	31	Parker Retzlaff (R)	Jordan Anderson Racing	Chevrolet	190	2	Accident	15
32	15	48	Parker Kligerman	Big Machine Racing	Chevrolet	70	0	Accident	5
33	37	39	Ryan Sieg	RSS Racing	Ford	70	0	Accident	4
34	18	78	Anthony Alfredo	B. J. McLeod Motorsports	Chevrolet	70	0	Accident	3
35	34	66	Chad Finchum	MBM Motorsports	Ford	60	0	Suspension	2
36	30	07	Stefan Parsons	SS-Green Light Racing	Chevrolet	48	0	Suspension	1
37	27	44	Rajah Caruth (i)	Alpha Prime Racing	Chevrolet	47	0	Oil Line	0
38	36	45	Greg Van Alst	Alpha Prime Racing	Chevrolet	17	0	Brakes	1
Official race results

== Standings after the race ==
Drivers' Championship standings

	Pos	Driver	Points
	1	John Hunter Nemechek	730
	2	Austin Hill	697 (-33)
1	3	Justin Allgaier	670 (–60)
1	4	Cole Custer	656 (–74)
	5	Chandler Smith	569 (–161)
	6	Josh Berry	544 (–186)
1	7	Daniel Hemric	510 (–220)
1	8	Sammy Smith	505 (–225)
2	9	Sam Mayer	502 (–228)
	10	Sheldon Creed	484 (–246)
	11	Riley Herbst	457 (–273)
	12	Parker Kligerman	439 (–291)
Official driver's standings

- Note: Only the first 12 positions are included for the driver standings.

Previous race: 2023 Alsco Uniforms 250	NASCAR Xfinity Series; 2023 season	Next race: 2023 Explore the Pocono Mountains 225
