= Big Machine Racing =

NASCAR team

- Owner: Scott Borchetta
- Base: Welcome, North Carolina
- Series: NASCAR O'Reilly Auto Parts Series
- Race drivers: 48. Will Rodgers
- Manufacturer: Chevrolet
- Opened: 2021

Career
- Debut: 2021 Beef. It's What's for Dinner 300 (Daytona)
- Latest race: 2026 O'Reilly Auto Parts 300 (Homestead)
- Races competed: 198
- Drivers' Championships: 0
- Race victories: 2
- Pole positions: 0

Big Machine Racing is an American professional stock car racing team that fields the No. 48 Chevrolet Camaro SS full-time in the NASCAR O'Reilly Auto Parts Series, driven by Will Rodgers. Since 2022, the team has had an alliance with Richard Childress Racing and has a shop on the RCR campus alongside Kaulig Racing in Welcome, North Carolina.

== History ==
The team was founded in 2021 by founder of Big Machine Records and American record executive Scott Borchetta, who at one point was a race car driver prior to founding Big Machine Records in 2005.

When the Jayski's Silly Season Site 2022 Xfinity Series team/driver chart was released, it was revealed that BMR may form an alliance with a larger NASCAR Xfinity Series team. On October 7, 2021, it was announced that the team would have an alliance with Richard Childress Racing in 2022 and they would move shops from Mooresville, North Carolina to one on the RCR campus in Welcome, North Carolina.

== O'Reilly Auto Parts Series ==
=== Car No. 5 History ===
Part-time (2023)

On February 2, 2023, the team announced that it would run a second car for the 2023 Daytona 300. Jade Buford was announced as the driver for the No. 5 car.

==== Car No. 5 results ====
Year	Driver	No.	Make	1	2	3	4	5	6	7	8	9	10	11	12	13	14	15	16	17	18	19	20	21	22	23	24	25	26	27	28	29	30	31	32	33	NXSC	Pts
2023	Jade Buford	5	Chevy	DAY; 25	CAL	LVS	PHO	ATL	COA	RCH	MAR	TAL; 36	DOV	DAR	CLT	PIR	SON	NSH	CSC	ATL	NHA	POC	ROA	MCH	IRC	GLN	DAY	DAR	KAN	BRI	TEX	ROV	LVS	HOM	MAR	PHO	48th	13

=== Car No. 48 History ===
Jade Buford (2021)

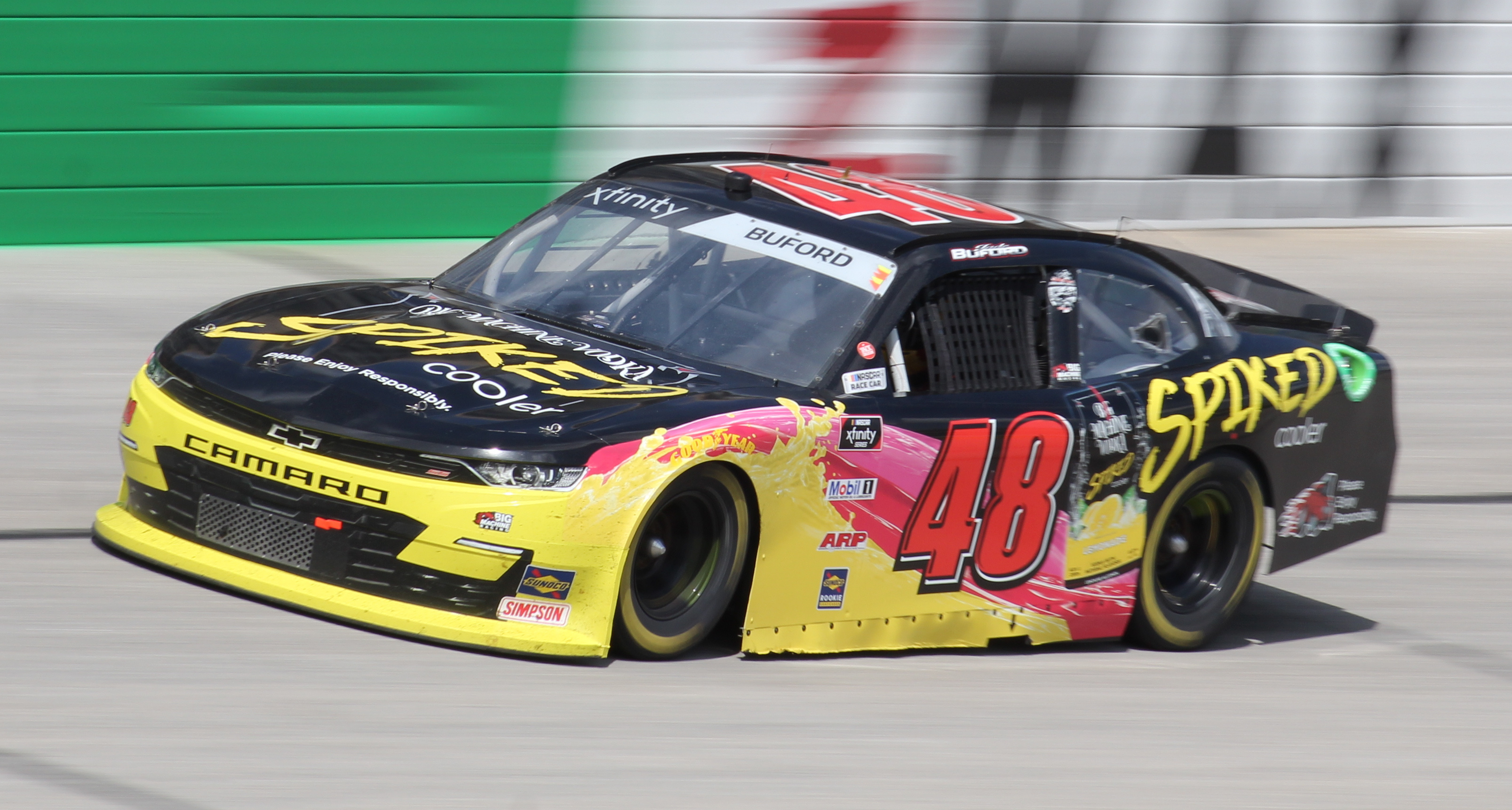
Buford's No. 48 at Atlanta in July 2021

On January 19, 2021, Big Machine Records founder and owner Scott Borchetta announced that he and the company were starting a full-time Xfinity Series team, Big Machine Racing, which would field the No. 48 Chevrolet. The team bought cars and equipment from RSS Racing/Reaume Brothers Racing's No. 93 car in 2020. Jade Buford was announced as the driver of the team's No. 48 car in 2021, running full-time and for Rookie of the Year. Buford drove in the Xfinity Series road course races in 2020 for SS-Green Light Racing with Big Machine Records as his sponsor. Patrick Donahue, who also moved over from SS-Green Light Racing (where he had been the crew chief of Joe Graf Jr.'s No. 08 car), was announced as the crew chief for Buford and the BMR No. 48 car. Due to only having competed on road courses in a stock car before the start of the season, Buford was not approved by NASCAR to race at Daytona to start the season, so his first race came at the Daytona Road Course the following week. On February 1, it was announced that On Point Motorsports Truck Series driver Danny Bohn would make his Xfinity Series debut at Daytona substituting for Buford. (Despite it being his first start in the series, Bohn was approved due to him previously having driven in a superspeedway race in NASCAR.)

Multiple drivers (2022)

Jade Buford started the year as the full-time driver of the No. 48, before being replaced by Kaz Grala prior to the spring Talladega race. Buford made one further start at Portland. Tyler Reddick, Austin Dillon, Ty Dillon, Ricky Stenhouse Jr., Ross Chastain, Nick Sanchez, Parker Kligerman, and Marco Andretti also made starts for the team throughout the season.

On May 21, 2022, Cup Series driver Tyler Reddick earned the team's first victory at Texas.

Parker Kligerman (2023–2024)

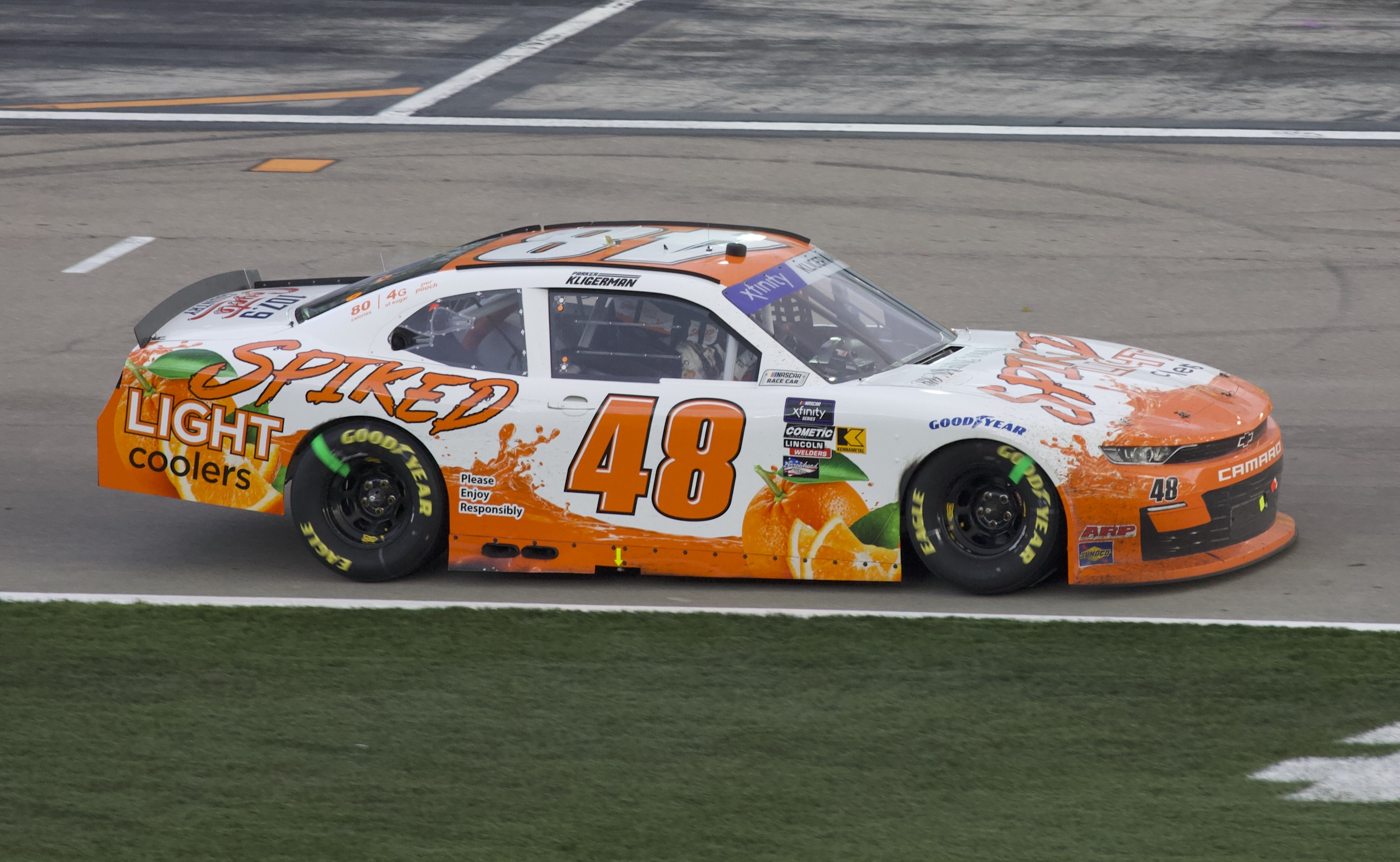
Kligerman's No. 48 at Las Vegas in March 2024.

On October 30, 2022, Big Machine announced that they would field the No. 48 car for Parker Kligerman in 2023. Following Kansas, Kligerman was able to qualify for the playoffs. After a controversial finish to end the Round of 12, Kligerman was eliminated at the conclusion of the Charlotte Roval race.

On August 24, 2023, Kligerman announced he will return for 2024. Following the Michigan race, the No. 48 was levied an L1 penalty after pre-race inspection discovered illegal modifications on the rear spoiler; as a result, the team was docked twenty owner and driver points, and crew chief Patrick Donahue was fined US$25,000. On September 11, Kligerman announced on his podcast that he will not return to BMR and would retire from full-time racing at the end of the 2024 season.

Nick Sanchez (2025)

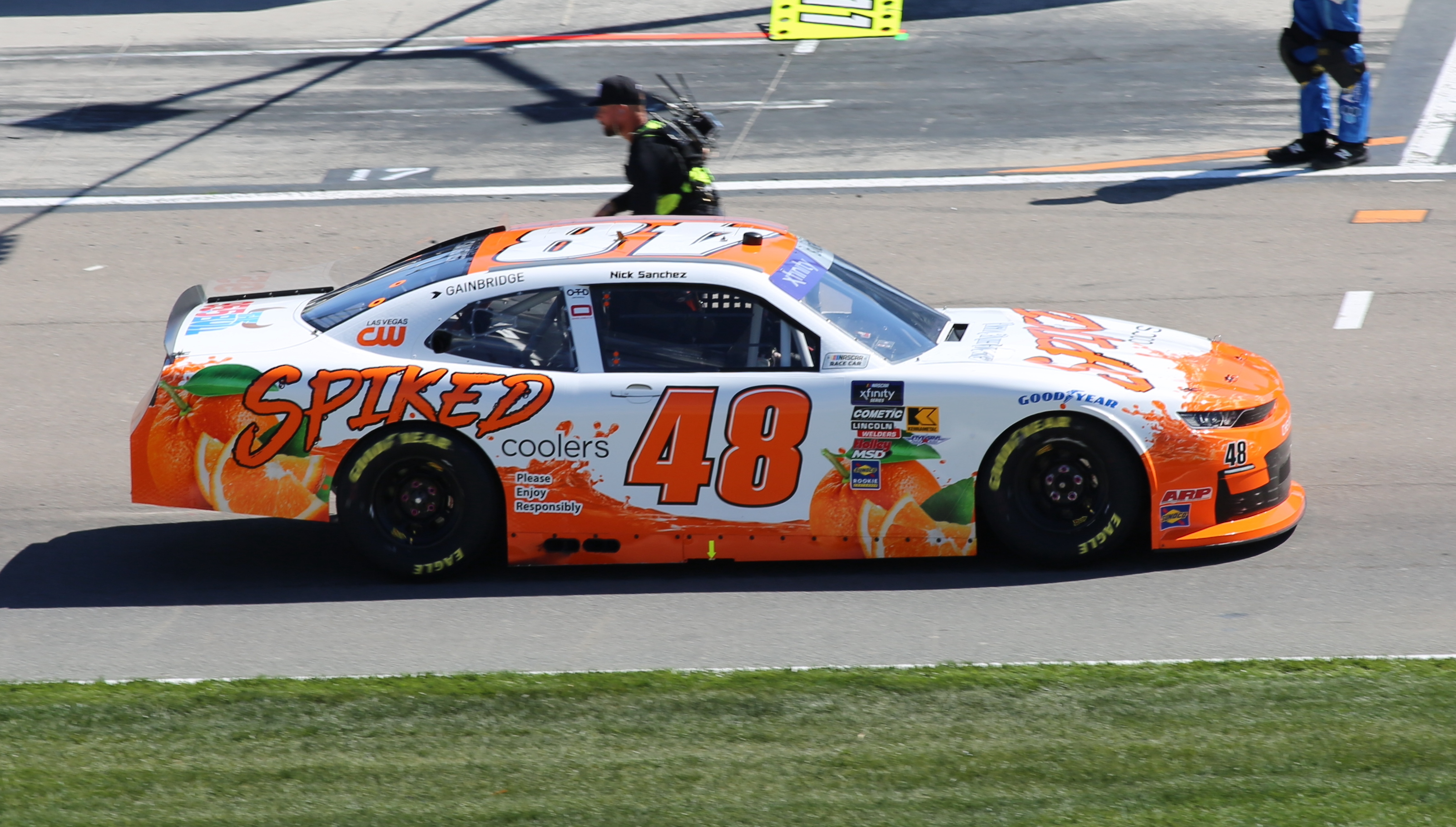
Nick Sanchez in the No. 48 at Las Vegas in March 2025.

On September 18, 2024, it was announced that Nick Sanchez would drive the No. 48 and compete for Rookie of the Year honors following two years in the Truck Series. He started the season with a 35th-place DNF at Daytona. After staying consistent throughout the season, he earned his first career victory at Atlanta.

Patrick Staropoli (2026)

Patrick Staropoli in the No. 48 car at Las Vegas in 2026

Although originally announced that Sanchez would return to BMR for the 2026 season, on December 8, 2025, Sanchez announced he would not return to BMR. On December 23, 2025, BMR announced that Patrick Staropoli would drive the No. 48 full-time. Staropoli will not return to BMR in 2027.

==== Will Rodgers (2027) ====
On November 7, 2026, BMR announced that Will Rodgers will drive the No. 48 full-time in 2027.

==== Car No. 48 results ====
Year	Driver	No.	Make	1	2	3	4	5	6	7	8	9	10	11	12	13	14	15	16	17	18	19	20	21	22	23	24	25	26	27	28	29	30	31	32	33	NXSC	Pts
2021	Danny Bohn	48	Chevy	DAY; 19																																	23rd	435
2021	Jade Buford	48	Chevy		DAY; 36	HOM; 20	LVS; 30	PHO; 20	ATL; 26	MAR; 19	TAL; 18	DAR; 35	DOV; 33	COA; 15	CLT; 17	MOH; 13	TEX; 16	NSH; 33	POC; 19	ROA; 34	ATL; 17	NHA; 18	GLN; 21	IND; 20	MCH; 9	DAY; 28	DAR; 21	RCH; 36	BRI; 27	LVS; 26	TAL; 12	ROV; 16	TEX; 39	KAN; 38	MAR; 17	PHO; 33	23rd	435
2022	Jade Buford	48	Chevy	DAY; 23	CAL; 37	LVS; 28	PHO; 28	ATL; 38	COA; 8	RCH; 33	MAR; 22						PIR; 14																				16th	633
2022	Kaz Grala	48	Chevy									TAL; 29	DOV; 24										IND; 32	MCH; 18	GLN; 5												16th	633
2022	Tyler Reddick	48	Chevy											DAR; 26	TEX; 1			NSH; 21	ROA; 30	ATL; 4																	16th	633
2022	Austin Dillon	48	Chevy													CLT; 31																					16th	633
2022	Ty Dillon	48	Chevy																		NHA; 6																16th	633
2022	Ricky Stenhouse Jr.	48	Chevy																			POC; 34				DAY; 27											16th	633
2022	Ross Chastain	48	Chevy																								DAR; 15	KAN; 5									16th	633
2022	Nick Sanchez	48	Chevy																										BRI; 29	TEX; 11			LVS; 12	HOM; 25	MAR; 7	PHO; 12	16th	633
2022	Parker Kligerman	48	Chevy																												TAL; 6						16th	633
2022	Marco Andretti	48	Chevy																													ROV; 36					16th	633
2023	Parker Kligerman	48	Chevy	DAY; 23	CAL; 10	LVS; 11	PHO; 15	ATL; 4	COA; 30	RCH; 8	MAR; 16	TAL; 3	DOV; 38	DAR; 13	CLT; 38	PIR; 14	SON; 5	NSH; 11	CSC; 9	ATL; 8	NHA; 32	POC; 9	ROA; 2	MCH; 8	IRC; 7	GLN; 3	DAY; 4	DAR; 24	KAN; 4	BRI; 31	TEX; 2	ROV; 6	LVS; 13	HOM; 7	MAR; 10	PHO; 16	10th	2209
2024	Parker Kligerman	48	Chevy	DAY; 25	ATL; 19	LVS; 11	PHO; 8	COA; 5	RCH; 7	MAR; 12	TEX; 25	TAL; 29	DOV; 12	DAR; 6	CLT; 37	PIR; 8	SON; 10	IOW; 11	NHA; 7	NSH; 16	CSC; 4	POC; 8	IND; 12	MCH; 11	DAY; 3	DAR; 13	ATL; 2	GLN; 7	BRI; 16	KAN; 12	TAL; 12	ROV; 6	LVS; 5	HOM; 11	MAR; 8	PHO; 14	11th	2189
2025	Nick Sanchez	48	Chevy	DAY; 35	ATL; 5	COA; 24	PHO; 10	LVS; 20	HOM; 8	MAR; 32	DAR; 8	BRI; 16	CAR; 31	TAL; 15	TEX; 20	CLT; 3	NSH; 14	MXC; 31	POC; 28	ATL; 1	CSC; 5	SON; 4	DOV; 37	IND; 33	IOW; 19	GLN; 24	DAY; 23	PIR; 3	GTW; 25	BRI; 13	KAN; 8	ROV; 9	LVS; 5	TAL; 20	MAR; 19	PHO; 15	12th	2198
2026	Patrick Staropoli	48	Chevy	DAY; 18	ATL; 13	COA; 20	PHO; 26	LVS; 21	DAR; 29	MAR; 16	ROC; 34	BRI; 27	KAN; 14	TAL; 37	TEX; 17	GLN; 38	DOV; 21	CLT; 18	NSH; 25	POC; 25	COR; 20	SON; 25	CHI; 27	ATL; 13	IND; 23	IOW; 18	DAY; 34	DAR; 32	GTW; 17	BRI; 26	LVS; 24	CLT; 33	PHO; 21	TAL; 32	MAR; 19	HOM; 19	27th	444
