= 2024 Food City 300 =

26th race of the 2024 NASCAR Xfinity Series

Race details
- Race 26 of 33 of the 2024 NASCAR Xfinity Series
- Date: September 20, 2024
- Official name: 43rd Annual Food City 300
- Location: Bristol Motor Speedway in Bristol, Tennessee
- Course: Permanent racing facility
- Course length: 0.533 miles (0.858 km)
- Distance: 300 laps, 160 mi (257 km)
- Scheduled distance: 300 laps, 160 mi (257 km)
- Average speed: 79.344 mph (127.692 km/h)

Pole position
Driver	Chandler Smith	Joe Gibbs Racing
- Time: 15.810

Most laps led
Driver	Cole Custer	Stewart-Haas Racing
- Laps: 104

Winner
No. 00	Cole Custer	Stewart-Haas Racing

Television in the United States
- Network: The CW
- Announcers: Rick Allen, Jeff Burton, and Steve Letarte

Radio in the United States
- Radio: PRN

The 2024 Food City 300 was the 26th stock car race of the 2024 NASCAR Xfinity Series, the final race of the regular season, and the 43rd iteration of the event. The race was held on Friday, September 20, 2024, at Bristol Motor Speedway in Bristol, Tennessee, a 0.533 miles (0.858 km) permanent oval shaped racetrack. The race took the scheduled 300 laps to complete. Cole Custer driving for Stewart–Haas Racing, would come out on top, earning his 15th career NASCAR Xfinity Series victory. Custer would dominate, leading a race high 104 laps. To fill out the podium, Sheldon Creed, and Chandler Smith, both driving for Joe Gibbs Racing, would finish 2nd and 3rd, respectively.

This was also the first race The CW would air. The CW took over the TV rights to the entire Xfinity Series schedule as part of the next TV contract which runs from 2025 to 2031.

== Report ==
=== Background ===
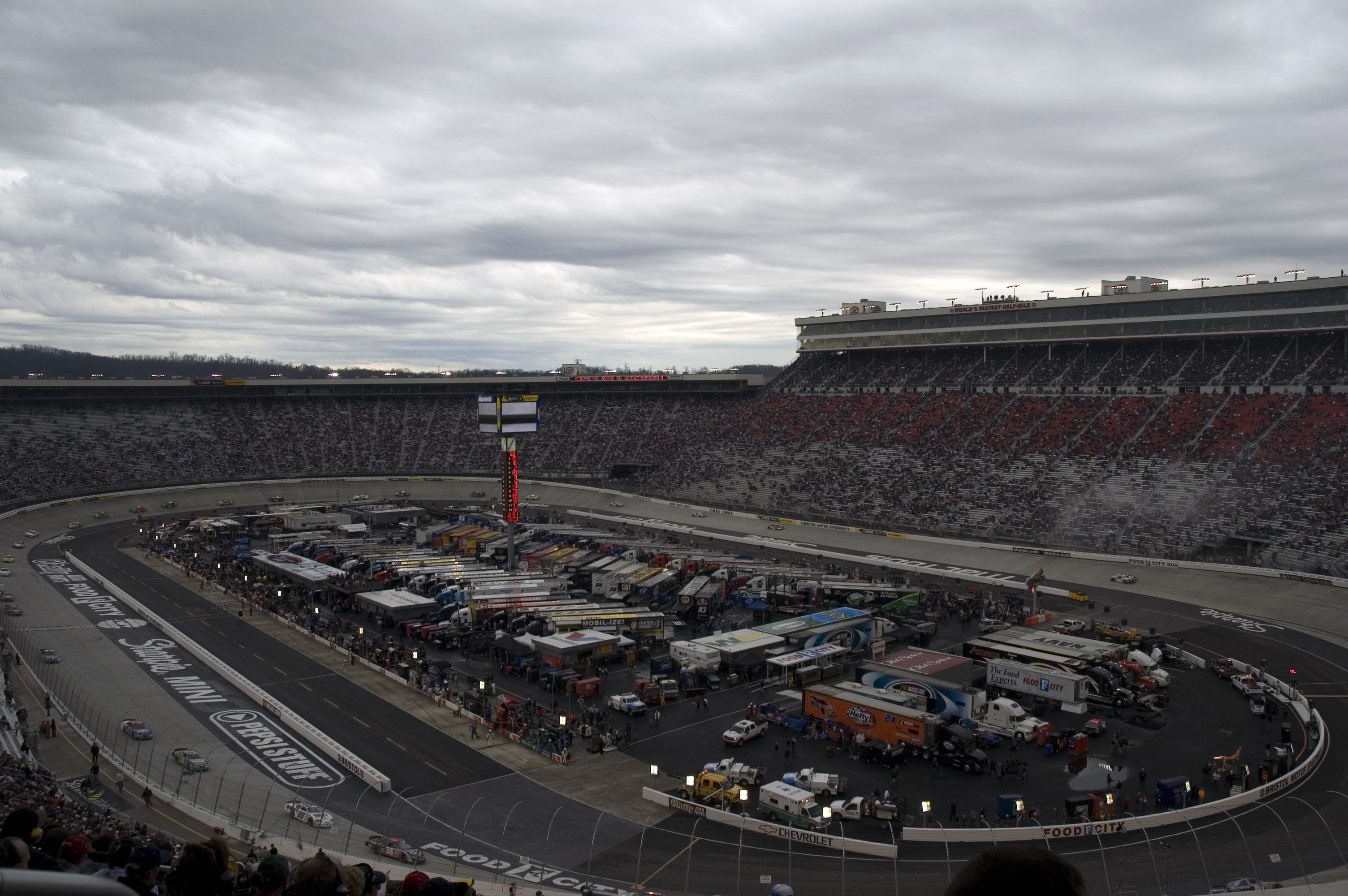
Bristol Motor Speedway, the track where the race was held.

The Bristol Motor Speedway, formerly known as Bristol International Raceway and Bristol Raceway, is a NASCAR short track venue located in Bristol, Tennessee. Constructed in 1960, it held its first NASCAR race on July 30, 1961. Despite its short length, Bristol is among the most popular tracks on the NASCAR schedule because of its distinct features, which include extraordinarily steep banking, an all concrete surface, two pit roads, and stadium-like seating. It has also been named one of the loudest NASCAR tracks.

==== Entry list ====
- (R) denotes rookie driver.
- (i) denotes driver who is ineligible for series driver points.

#	Driver	Team	Make
00	Cole Custer	Stewart–Haas Racing	Ford
1	Sam Mayer	JR Motorsports	Chevrolet
2	Jesse Love (R)	Richard Childress Racing	Chevrolet
5	Anthony Alfredo	Our Motorsports	Chevrolet
07	Greg Van Alst	SS-Green Light Racing	Chevrolet
7	Justin Allgaier	JR Motorsports	Chevrolet
8	Sammy Smith	JR Motorsports	Chevrolet
9	Brandon Jones	JR Motorsports	Chevrolet
11	Josh Williams	Kaulig Racing	Chevrolet
14	Chad Finchum	SS-Green Light Racing	Ford
15	Logan Bearden	AM Racing	Ford
16	A. J. Allmendinger	Kaulig Racing	Chevrolet
18	Sheldon Creed	Joe Gibbs Racing	Toyota
19	Joe Graf Jr.	Joe Gibbs Racing	Toyota
20	Ryan Truex	Joe Gibbs Racing	Toyota
21	Austin Hill	Richard Childress Racing	Chevrolet
26	Jeffrey Earnhardt (i)	Sam Hunt Racing	Toyota
27	Jeb Burton	Jordan Anderson Racing	Chevrolet
28	Kyle Sieg	RSS Racing	Ford
29	Blaine Perkins	RSS Racing	Ford
31	Parker Retzlaff	Jordan Anderson Racing	Chevrolet
32	Austin Green	Jordan Anderson Racing	Chevrolet
35	Carson Ware	Joey Gase Motorsports	Toyota
38	Matt DiBenedetto	RSS Racing	Ford
39	Ryan Sieg	RSS Racing	Ford
42	Leland Honeyman (R)	Young's Motorsports	Chevrolet
43	Ryan Ellis	Alpha Prime Racing	Chevrolet
44	Brennan Poole	Alpha Prime Racing	Chevrolet
45	Stefan Parsons (i)	Alpha Prime Racing	Chevrolet
48	Parker Kligerman	Big Machine Racing	Chevrolet
51	Jeremy Clements	Jeremy Clements Racing	Chevrolet
53	Garrett Smithley	Joey Gase Motorsports	Ford
74	Dawson Cram (i)	Mike Harmon Racing	Chevrolet
81	Chandler Smith	Joe Gibbs Racing	Toyota
88	Dale Earnhardt Jr.	JR Motorsports	Chevrolet
91	Kyle Weatherman	DGM Racing	Chevrolet
92	Josh Bilicki	DGM Racing	Chevrolet
97	Shane van Gisbergen (R)	Kaulig Racing	Chevrolet
98	Riley Herbst	Stewart–Haas Racing	Ford
Official entry list

== Practice ==
For practice, drivers will be separated into two groups, Group A and B. Both sessions will be 15 minutes long, and was held on Friday, September 20, at 2:35 PM EST. Justin Allgaier, driving for JR Motorsports, would set the fastest time in the session, with a lap of 16.055, and a speed of 119.514 mph (192.339 km/h).

Pos.	#	Driver	Team	Make	Time	Speed
1	7	Justin Allgaier	JR Motorsports	Chevrolet	16.055	119.514
2	00	Cole Custer	Stewart–Haas Racing	Ford	16.124	119.003
3	26	Jeffrey Earnhardt (i)	Sam Hunt Racing	Toyota	16.144	118.855
Full practice results

== Qualifying ==
Qualifying was held on Friday, September 20, at 3:10 PM EST. Since Bristol Motor Speedway is a short track, the qualifying system used is a single-car, two-lap system with only one round. Drivers will be on track by themselves and will have two laps to post a qualifying time, and whoever sets the fastest time will win the pole.

Chandler Smith, driving for Joe Gibbs Racing, would score the pole for the race, with a lap of 15.810, and a speed of 121.366 mph (195.320 km/h).

Dawson Cram was the only driver who failed to qualify.

=== Qualifying results ===
Pos.	#	Driver	Team	Make	Time	Speed
1	81	Chandler Smith	Joe Gibbs Racing	Toyota	15.810	121.366
2	00	Cole Custer	Stewart–Haas Racing	Ford	15.925	120.490
3	5	Anthony Alfredo	Our Motorsports	Chevrolet	15.935	120.414
4	7	Justin Allgaier	JR Motorsports	Chevrolet	15.945	120.339
5	16	A. J. Allmendinger	Kaulig Racing	Chevrolet	16.042	119.611
6	26	Jeffrey Earnhardt (i)	Sam Hunt Racing	Toyota	16.047	119.574
7	51	Jeremy Clements	Jeremy Clements Racing	Chevrolet	16.051	119.544
8	9	Brandon Jones	JR Motorsports	Chevrolet	16.061	119.470
9	91	Kyle Weatherman	DGM Racing	Chevrolet	16.061	119.470
10	2	Jesse Love (R)	Richard Childress Racing	Chevrolet	16.064	119.447
11	48	Parker Kligerman	Big Machine Racing	Chevrolet	16.066	119.432
12	39	Ryan Sieg	RSS Racing	Ford	16.075	119.365
13	88	Dale Earnhardt Jr.	JR Motorsports	Chevrolet	16.075	119.365
14	18	Sheldon Creed	Joe Gibbs Racing	Toyota	16.085	119.291
15	98	Riley Herbst	Stewart–Haas Racing	Ford	16.088	119.269
16	20	Ryan Truex	Joe Gibbs Racing	Toyota	16.108	119.121
17	21	Austin Hill	Richard Childress Racing	Chevrolet	16.125	118.995
18	14	Chad Finchum	SS-Green Light Racing	Ford	16.134	118.929
19	19	Joe Graf Jr.	Joe Gibbs Racing	Toyota	16.141	118.877
20	1	Sam Mayer	JR Motorsports	Chevrolet	16.171	118.657
21	8	Sammy Smith	JR Motorsports	Chevrolet	16.180	118.591
22	92	Josh Bilicki	DGM Racing	Chevrolet	16.188	118.532
23	45	Stefan Parsons (i)	Alpha Prime Racing	Chevrolet	16.188	118.532
24	38	Matt DiBenedetto	RSS Racing	Ford	16.203	118.423
25	27	Jeb Burton	Jordan Anderson Racing	Chevrolet	16.207	118.393
26	43	Ryan Ellis	Alpha Prime Racing	Chevrolet	16.255	118.044
27	31	Parker Retzlaff	Jordan Anderson Racing	Chevrolet	16.263	117.986
28	32	Austin Green	Jordan Anderson Racing	Chevrolet	16.294	117.761
29	44	Brennan Poole	Alpha Prime Racing	Chevrolet	16.328	117.516
30	35	Carson Ware	Joey Gase Motorsports	Chevrolet	16.339	117.437
31	42	Leland Honeyman (R)	Young's Motorsports	Chevrolet	16.356	117.315
32	11	Josh Williams	Kaulig Racing	Chevrolet	16.386	117.100
33	29	Blaine Perkins	RSS Racing	Ford	16.392	117.057
Qualified by owner's points
34	97	Shane van Gisbergen (R)	Kaulig Racing	Chevrolet	16.426	116.815
35	15	Logan Bearden	AM Racing	Ford	16.442	116.701
36	28	Kyle Sieg	RSS Racing	Ford	16.504	116.263
37	53	Garrett Smithley	Joey Gase Motorsports	Ford	16.817	114.099
38	07	Greg Van Alst	SS-Green Light Racing	Chevrolet	16.832	113.997
Failed to qualify
39	74	Dawson Cram (i)	Mike Harmon Racing	Chevrolet	16.620	115.451
Official qualifying results
Official starting lineup

== Race results ==
Stage 1 Laps: 85

Pos.	#	Driver	Team	Make	Pts
1	81	Chandler Smith	Joe Gibbs Racing	Toyota	10
2	2	Jesse Love (R)	Richard Childress Racing	Chevrolet	9
3	18	Sheldon Creed	Joe Gibbs Racing	Toyota	8
4	16	A. J. Allmendinger	Kaulig Racing	Chevrolet	7
5	5	Anthony Alfredo	Our Motorsports	Chevrolet	6
6	51	Jeremy Clements	Jeremy Clements Racing	Chevrolet	5
7	00	Cole Custer	Stewart-Haas Racing	Ford	4
8	26	Jeffrey Earnhardt (i)	Sam Hunt Racing	Toyota	0
9	20	Ryan Truex	Joe Gibbs Racing	Toyota	2
10	19	Joe Graf Jr.	Joe Gibbs Racing	Toyota	1

Stage 2 Laps: 85

Pos.	#	Driver	Team	Make	Pts
1	51	Jeremy Clements	Jeremy Clements Racing	Chevrolet	10
2	00	Cole Custer	Stewart-Haas Racing	Ford	9
3	20	Ryan Truex	Joe Gibbs Racing	Toyota	8
4	18	Sheldon Creed	Joe Gibbs Racing	Toyota	7
5	81	Chandler Smith	Joe Gibbs Racing	Toyota	6
6	2	Jesse Love (R)	Richard Childress Racing	Chevrolet	5
7	98	Riley Herbst	Stewart-Haas Racing	Ford	4
8	1	Sam Mayer	JR Motorsports	Chevrolet	3
9	88	Dale Earnhardt Jr.	JR Motorsports	Chevrolet	2
10	48	Parker Kligerman	Big Machine Racing	Chevrolet	1

Stage 3 Laps: 130

Pos.	St.	#	Driver	Team	Make	Laps	Led	Status	Pts
1	2	00	Cole Custer	Stewart-Haas Racing	Ford	300	104	Running	53
2	14	18	Sheldon Creed	Joe Gibbs Racing	Toyota	300	28	Running	50
3	1	81	Chandler Smith	Joe Gibbs Racing	Toyota	300	29	Running	50

== Standings after the race ==
Drivers' Championship standings

	Pos	Driver	Points
	1	Justin Allgaier	2034
	2	Cole Custer	2028 (-6)
1	3	Austin Hill	2025 (–9)
1	4	Chandler Smith	2024 (–10)
7	5	Shane van Gisbergen	2017 (–17)
1	6	Jesse Love	2013 (–21)
6	7	Sam Mayer	2011 (–23)
	8	Riley Herbst	2010 (–24)
3	9	Sheldon Creed	2007 (–27)
5	10	A. J. Allmendinger	2006 (–28)
1	11	Sammy Smith	2001 (–33)
3	12	Parker Kligerman	1998 (–36)
Official driver's standings

Manufacturers' Championship standings

Pos	Manufacturer	Points
1	Chevrolet	965
2	Toyota	926 (-39)
3	Ford	835 (–130)

- Note: Only the first 12 positions are included for the driver standings.

Previous race: 2024 Mission 200 at The Glen	NASCAR Xfinity Series; 2024 season	Next race: 2024 Kansas Lottery 300
