= 2024 Mission 200 at The Glen =

25th race of the 2024 NASCAR Xfinity Series

Race details
- Race 25 of 33 of the 2024 NASCAR Xfinity Series
- Date: September 14, 2024
- Official name: 29th Annual Mission 200 at The Glen
- Location: Watkins Glen International in Watkins Glen, New York
- Course: Permanent racing facility
- Course length: 2.454 miles (3.949 km)
- Distance: 90 laps, 220 mi (354 km)
- Scheduled distance: 82 laps, 201 mi (323 km)
- Average speed: 85.007 mph (136.806 km/h)

Pole position
Driver	Connor Zilisch	JR Motorsports
- Time: 1:11.028

Most laps led
Driver	Connor Zilisch	JR Motorsports
- Laps: 45

Winner
No. 88	Connor Zilisch	JR Motorsports

Television in the United States
- Network: USA
- Announcers: Rick Allen, Steve Letarte, and Jeff Burton (booth, Turns 6-7), Mike Bagley (Esses), and Dillon Welch (Turn 5)

Radio in the United States
- Radio: MRN

The 2024 Mission 200 at The Glen was the 25th stock car race of the 2024 NASCAR Xfinity Series, and the 29th iteration of the event. The race was held on Saturday, September 14, 2024, at Watkins Glen International in Watkins Glen, New York, a 2.454 miles (3.949 km) permanent road course. The race was originally scheduled to be contested over 82 laps, but was increased to 90 laps due to numerous overtime attempts. In an exciting final stage, Connor Zilisch, driving for JR Motorsports, would survive two overtime restarts while managing fuel mileage, and pulled off an incredible performance to earn his first career NASCAR O'Reilly Auto Parts Series win in his first career start. Zilisch was also the most dominant driver of the race, winning the first stage and leading a race-high 45 laps. To fill out the podium, Sheldon Creed, driving for Joe Gibbs Racing, and A. J. Allmendinger, driving for Kaulig Racing, would finish 2nd and 3rd, respectively.

With Zilisch's win, he became the seventh driver in O'Reilly Auto Parts Series history to win in their series debut, and the first driver across all three NASCAR divisions to win both the pole position and the race in their first start. At 18 years, 1 month, and 23 days old, he is also the second-youngest winner in O'Reilly Auto Parts Series history.

This was also the last race USA would air and broadcast the series. The CW will take over the TV rights to the entire O'Reilly Auto Parts Series schedule as part of the next TV contract which runs from 2025 to 2031.

== Report ==
=== Background ===
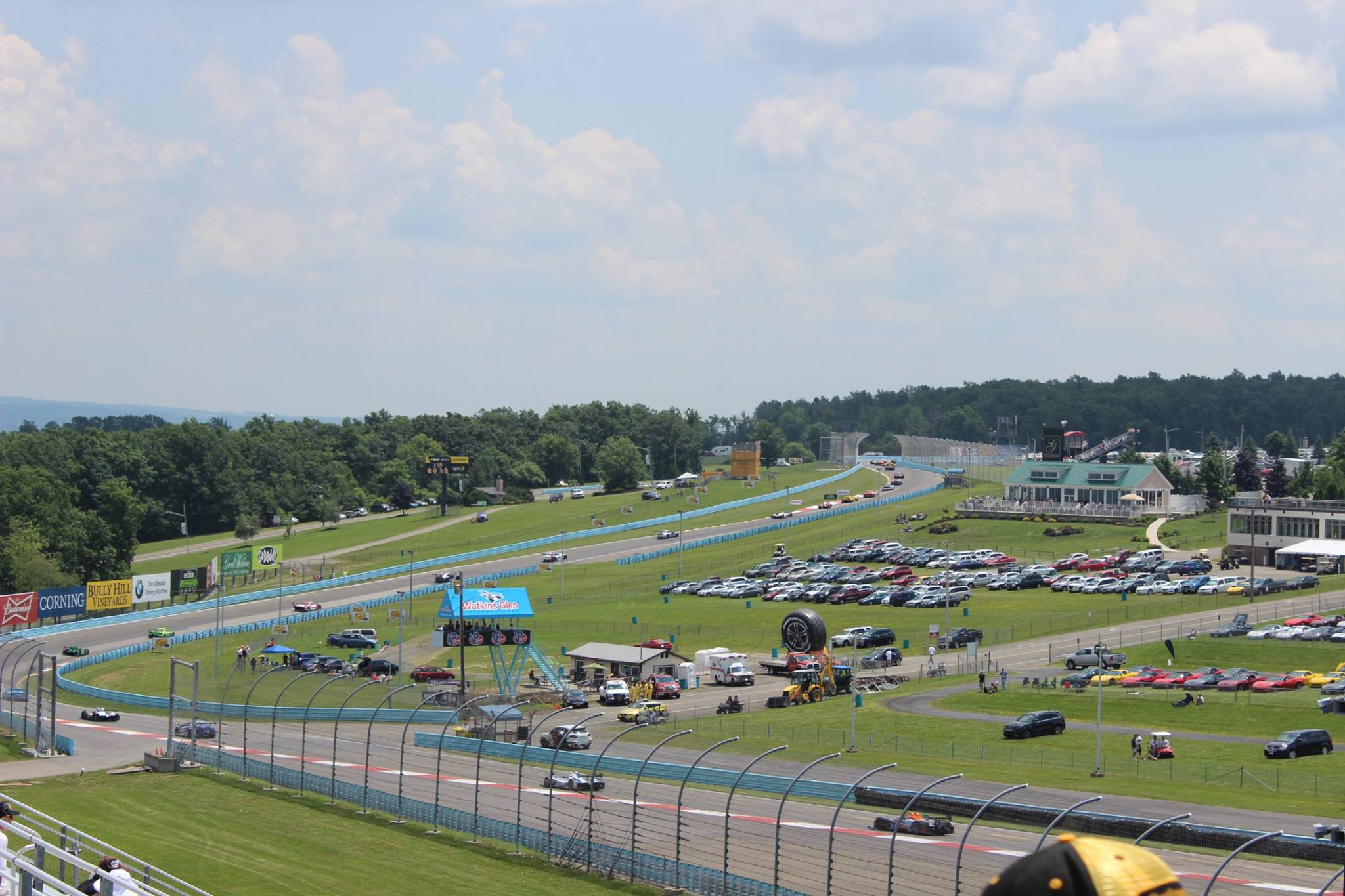
Watkins Glen International, the circuit where the race was held.

Watkins Glen International (nicknamed "The Glen") is an automobile race track located in Watkins Glen, New York at the southern tip of Seneca Lake. It was long known around the world as the home of the Formula One United States Grand Prix, which it hosted for twenty consecutive years (1961–1980), but the site has been home to road racing of nearly every class, including the World Sportscar Championship, Trans-Am, Can-Am, NASCAR Cup Series, the International Motor Sports Association and the IndyCar Series.

Initially, public roads in the village were used for the race course. In 1956 a permanent circuit for the race was built. In 1968 the race was extended to six hours, becoming the 6 Hours of Watkins Glen. The circuit's current layout has more or less been the same since 1971, although a chicane was installed at the uphill Esses in 1975 to slow cars through these corners, where there was a fatality during practice at the 1973 United States Grand Prix. The chicane was removed in 1985, but another chicane called the "Inner Loop" was installed in 1992 after J.D. McDuffie's fatal accident during the previous year's NASCAR Winston Cup event.

The circuit is known as the Mecca of North American road racing and is a very popular venue among fans and drivers. The facility is currently owned by International Speedway Corporation.

==== Entry list ====
- (R) denotes rookie driver.
- (i) denotes driver who is ineligible for series driver points.

#	Driver	Team	Make
00	Cole Custer	Stewart–Haas Racing	Ford
1	Sam Mayer	JR Motorsports	Chevrolet
2	Jesse Love (R)	Richard Childress Racing	Chevrolet
5	Anthony Alfredo	Our Motorsports	Chevrolet
07	Jade Buford	SS-Green Light Racing	Chevrolet
7	Justin Allgaier	JR Motorsports	Chevrolet
8	Sammy Smith	JR Motorsports	Chevrolet
9	Brandon Jones	JR Motorsports	Chevrolet
11	Josh Williams	Kaulig Racing	Chevrolet
13	Kyle Keller	MBM Motorsports	Ford
14	R. C. Enerson	SS-Green Light Racing	Ford
15	Joey Logano (i)	AM Racing	Ford
16	A. J. Allmendinger	Kaulig Racing	Chevrolet
17	William Byron (i)	Hendrick Motorsports	Chevrolet
18	Sheldon Creed	Joe Gibbs Racing	Toyota
19	Ty Gibbs (i)	Joe Gibbs Racing	Toyota
20	Aric Almirola	Joe Gibbs Racing	Toyota
21	Austin Hill	Richard Childress Racing	Chevrolet
26	Ed Jones	Sam Hunt Racing	Toyota
27	Jeb Burton	Jordan Anderson Racing	Chevrolet
28	Kyle Sieg	RSS Racing	Ford
29	Blaine Perkins	RSS Racing	Ford
31	Parker Retzlaff	Jordan Anderson Racing	Chevrolet
32	Austin Green	Jordan Anderson Racing	Chevrolet
35	Thomas Annunziata (Note: Annunziata started the race, but was substituted by Joey Gase after Annunziata exited the race in stage three due to dehydration. Since Annunziata started the race, he is officially credited with the 29th place finish.)	Joey Gase Motorsports	Toyota
36	Kyle Weatherman	DGM Racing	Chevrolet
38	Matt DiBenedetto	RSS Racing	Ford
39	Ryan Sieg	RSS Racing	Ford
42	Leland Honeyman (R)	Young's Motorsports	Chevrolet
43	Ryan Ellis	Alpha Prime Racing	Chevrolet
44	Brennan Poole	Alpha Prime Racing	Chevrolet
45	Alon Day	Alpha Prime Racing	Chevrolet
48	Parker Kligerman	Big Machine Racing	Chevrolet
51	Jeremy Clements	Jeremy Clements Racing	Chevrolet
81	Chandler Smith	Joe Gibbs Racing	Toyota
87	Mike Skeen	Jordan Anderson Racing	Chevrolet
88	Connor Zilisch	JR Motorsports	Chevrolet
91	Josh Bilicki	DGM Racing	Chevrolet
92	Ross Chastain (i)	DGM Racing	Chevrolet
97	Shane van Gisbergen (R)	Kaulig Racing	Chevrolet
98	Riley Herbst	Stewart–Haas Racing	Ford
Official entry list

== Practice ==
The first and only practice session was held on Saturday, September 14, at 10:00 AM EST, and would last for 20 minutes. Connor Zilisch, driving for JR Motorsports, would set the fastest time in the session, with a lap of 1:12.069, and a speed of 122.383 mph (196.956 km/h).

Pos.	#	Driver	Team	Make	Time	Speed
1	88	Connor Zilisch	JR Motorsports	Chevrolet	1:12.069	122.383
2	19	Ty Gibbs (i)	Joe Gibbs Racing	Toyota	1:12.386	121.852
3	16	A. J. Allmendinger	Kaulig Racing	Chevrolet	1:12.471	121.704
Full practice results

== Qualifying ==
Qualifying was held on Saturday, September 14, at 10:30 AM EST. Since Watkins Glen International is a road course, the qualifying system is a two group system, with two rounds. Drivers will be separated into two groups, Group A and Group B. Each driver will have multiple laps to set a time. The fastest 5 drivers from each group will advance to the final round. The fastest driver to set a time in that round will win the pole.

Under a 2021 rule change, the timing line in road course qualifying is "not" the start-finish line. Instead, the timing line for qualifying will be set at the exit of Turn 9. In his first career start, Connor Zilisch, driving for JR Motorsports, would win the pole after advancing from the preliminary round and setting the fastest time in Round 2, with a lap of 1:11.028, and a speed of 124.176 mph (199.842 km/h).

Three drivers would fail to qualify: Blaine Perkins, Jade Buford, and Kyle Keller.

=== Qualifying results ===
Pos.	#	Driver	Team	Make	Time (R1)	Speed (R1)	Time (R2)	Speed (R2)
1	88	Connor Zilisch	JR Motorsports	Chevrolet	1:11.364	123.592	1:11.028	124.176
2	19	Ty Gibbs (i)	Joe Gibbs Racing	Toyota	1:11.473	123.403	1:11.171	123.927
3	16	A. J. Allmendinger	Kaulig Racing	Chevrolet	1:11.418	123.498	1:11.404	123.522
4	7	Justin Allgaier	JR Motorsports	Chevrolet	1:11.039	124.157	1:11.428	123.481
5	1	Sam Mayer	JR Motorsports	Chevrolet	1:11.517	123.327	1:11.574	123.229
6	81	Chandler Smith	Joe Gibbs Racing	Toyota	1:11.732	122.958	1:11.659	123.083
7	17	William Byron (i)	Hendrick Motorsports	Chevrolet	1:11.630	123.133	1:11.711	122.994
8	20	Aric Almirola	Joe Gibbs Racing	Toyota	1:11.714	122.989	1:11.847	122.761
9	18	Sheldon Creed	Joe Gibbs Racing	Toyota	1:11.762	122.906	1:12.046	122.422
10	21	Austin Hill	Richard Childress Racing	Chevrolet	1:11.736	122.951	1:12.198	122.164
Eliminated in Round 1
11	2	Jesse Love (R)	Richard Childress Racing	Chevrolet	1:11.782	122.872	—	—
12	98	Riley Herbst	Stewart–Haas Racing	Ford	1:11.806	122.831	—	—
13	97	Shane van Gisbergen (R)	Kaulig Racing	Chevrolet	1:11.847	122.761	—	—
14	39	Ryan Sieg	RSS Racing	Ford	1:11.847	122.761	—	—
15	00	Cole Custer	Stewart–Haas Racing	Ford	1:11.979	122.536	—	—
16	9	Brandon Jones	JR Motorsports	Chevrolet	1:12.079	122.366	—	—
17	8	Sammy Smith	JR Motorsports	Chevrolet	1:12.130	122.279	—	—
18	51	Jeremy Clements	Jeremy Clements Racing	Chevrolet	1:12.160	122.228	—	—
19	48	Parker Kligerman	Big Machine Racing	Chevrolet	1:12.201	122.159	—	—
20	38	Matt DiBenedetto	RSS Racing	Ford	1:12.325	121.950	—	—
21	92	Ross Chastain (i)	DGM Racing	Chevrolet	1:12.360	121.891	—	—
22	45	Alon Day	Alpha Prime Racing	Chevrolet	1:12.568	121.541	—	—
23	31	Parker Retzlaff	Jordan Anderson Racing	Chevrolet	1:12.578	121.524	—	—
24	5	Anthony Alfredo	Our Motorsports	Chevrolet	1:12.581	121.519	—	—
25	87	Mike Skeen	Jordan Anderson Racing	Chevrolet	1:12.656	121.394	—	—
26	91	Josh Bilicki	DGM Racing	Chevrolet	1:12.684	121.347	—	—
27	32	Austin Green	Jordan Anderson Racing	Chevrolet	1:12.717	121.292	—	—
28	27	Jeb Burton	Jordan Anderson Racing	Chevrolet	1:12.736	121.260	—	—
29	36	Kyle Weatherman	DGM Racing	Chevrolet	1:12.763	121.215	—	—
30	35	Thomas Annunziata	Joey Gase Motorsports	Toyota	1:12.879	121.023	—	—
31	44	Brennan Poole	Alpha Prime Racing	Chevrolet	1:13.028	120.776	—	—
32	42	Leland Honeyman (R)	Young's Motorsports	Chevrolet	1:13.177	120.530	—	—
33	15	Joey Logano (i)	AM Racing	Ford	1:13.183	120.520	—	—
Qualified by owner's points
34	14	R. C. Enerson	SS-Green Light Racing	Chevrolet	1:13.238	120.429	—	—
35	43	Ryan Ellis	Alpha Prime Racing	Chevrolet	1:13.374	120.206	—	—
36	28	Kyle Sieg	RSS Racing	Ford	1:13.434	120.108	—	—
37	26	Ed Jones	Sam Hunt Racing	Toyota	—	—	—	—
38	11	Josh Williams	Kaulig Racing	Chevrolet	—	—	—	—
Failed to qualify
39	29	Blaine Perkins	RSS Racing	Ford	1:13.344	120.255	—	—
40	07	Jade Buford	SS-Green Light Racing	Chevrolet	1:13.392	120.177	—	—
41	13	Kyle Keller	MBM Motorsports	Ford	1:14.291	118.722	—	—
Official qualifying results
Official starting lineup

== Race results ==
Stage 1 Laps: 20

Pos.	#	Driver	Team	Make	Pts
1	88	Connor Zilisch	JR Motorsports	Chevrolet	10
2	7	Justin Allgaier	JR Motorsports	Chevrolet	9
3	20	Aric Almirola	Joe Gibbs Racing	Toyota	8
4	81	Chandler Smith	Joe Gibbs Racing	Toyota	7
5	18	Sheldon Creed	Joe Gibbs Racing	Toyota	6
6	00	Cole Custer	Stewart-Haas Racing	Ford	5
7	2	Jesse Love (R)	Richard Childress Racing	Chevrolet	4
8	98	Riley Herbst	Stewart-Haas Racing	Ford	3
9	39	Ryan Sieg	RSS Racing	Ford	2
10	51	Jeremy Clements	Jeremy Clements Racing	Chevrolet	1

Stage 2 Laps: 20

Pos.	#	Driver	Team	Make	Pts
1	17	William Byron (i)	Hendrick Motorsports	Chevrolet	0
2	19	Ty Gibbs (i)	Joe Gibbs Racing	Toyota	0
3	88	Connor Zilisch	JR Motorsports	Chevrolet	8
4	1	Sam Mayer	JR Motorsports	Chevrolet	7
5	7	Justin Allgaier	JR Motorsports	Chevrolet	6
6	00	Cole Custer	Stewart-Haas Racing	Ford	5
7	98	Riley Herbst	Stewart-Haas Racing	Ford	4
8	21	Austin Hill	Richard Childress Racing	Chevrolet	3
9	39	Ryan Sieg	RSS Racing	Ford	2
10	51	Jeremy Clements	Jeremy Clements Racing	Chevrolet	1

Stage 3 Laps: 50

Pos.	St	#	Driver	Team	Make	Laps	Led	Status	Pts
1	1	88	Connor Zilisch	JR Motorsports	Chevrolet	90	45	Running	58
2	9	18	Sheldon Creed	Joe Gibbs Racing	Toyota	90	0	Running	41
3	3	16	A. J. Allmendinger	Kaulig Racing	Chevrolet	90	5	Running	34
4	6	81	Chandler Smith	Joe Gibbs Racing	Toyota	90	0	Running	40
5	13	97	Shane van Gisbergen (R)	Kaulig Racing	Chevrolet	90	14	Running	32
6	21	92	Ross Chastain (i)	DGM Racing	Chevrolet	90	0	Running	0
7	19	48	Parker Kligerman	Big Machine Racing	Chevrolet	90	0	Running	30
8	11	2	Jesse Love (R)	Richard Childress Racing	Chevrolet	90	0	Running	33
9	33	15	Joey Logano (i)	AM Racing	Ford	90	0	Running	0
10	26	91	Josh Bilicki	DGM Racing	Chevrolet	90	0	Running	27
11	27	32	Austin Green	Jordan Anderson Racing	Chevrolet	90	0	Running	26
12	7	17	William Byron (i)	Hendrick Motorsports	Chevrolet	90	16	Running	0
13	12	98	Riley Herbst	Stewart–Haas Racing	Ford	90	0	Running	31
14	23	31	Parker Retzlaff	Jordan Anderson Racing	Chevrolet	90	0	Running	23
15	35	43	Ryan Ellis	Alpha Prime Racing	Chevrolet	90	0	Running	22
16	32	42	Leland Honeyman (R)	Young's Motorsports	Chevrolet	90	0	Running	21
17	4	7	Justin Allgaier	JR Motorsports	Chevrolet	90	0	Running	35
18	18	51	Jeremy Clements	Jeremy Clements Racing	Chevrolet	90	0	Running	21
19	17	8	Sammy Smith	JR Motorsports	Chevrolet	90	0	Running	18
20	5	1	Sam Mayer	JR Motorsports	Chevrolet	90	1	Running	24
21	15	00	Cole Custer	Stewart–Haas Racing	Ford	90	6	Running	26
22	14	39	Ryan Sieg	RSS Racing	Ford	89	0	Running	19
23	31	44	Brennan Poole	Alpha Prime Racing	Chevrolet	89	0	Running	14
24	37	26	Ed Jones	Sam Hunt Racing	Toyota	89	0	Running	13
25	2	19	Ty Gibbs (i)	Joe Gibbs Racing	Toyota	89	3	Running	0
26	8	20	Aric Almirola	Joe Gibbs Racing	Toyota	88	0	Running	19
27	34	14	R. C. Enerson	SS-Green Light Racing	Chevrolet	85	0	Running	10
28	16	9	Brandon Jones	JR Motorsports	Chevrolet	84	0	Accident	9
29	30	35	Thomas Annunziata	Joey Gase Motorsports	Toyota	84	0	Running	8
30	25	87	Mike Skeen	Jordan Anderson Racing	Chevrolet	83	0	Accident	7
31	28	27	Jeb Burton	Jordan Anderson Racing	Chevrolet	81	0	Oil Leak	6
32	38	11	Josh Williams	Kaulig Racing	Chevrolet	80	0	Accident	5
33	10	21	Austin Hill	Richard Childress Racing	Chevrolet	80	0	Accident	7
34	24	5	Anthony Alfredo	Our Motorsports	Chevrolet	80	0	Accident	3
35	20	38	Matt DiBenedetto	RSS Racing	Ford	75	0	Rear Gear	2
36	22	45	Alon Day	Alpha Prime Racing	Chevrolet	57	0	Brakes	1
37	36	28	Kyle Sieg	RSS Racing	Ford	54	0	Axle	1
38	29	36	Kyle Weatherman	DGM Racing	Chevrolet	15	0	Rear End	1
Official race results

== Standings after the race ==
Drivers' Championship standings

	Pos	Driver	Points
	1	Justin Allgaier	901
	2	Cole Custer	858 (-43)
	3	Chandler Smith	839 (–62)
	4	Austin Hill	802 (–99)
	5	A. J. Allmendinger	778 (–123)
	6	Sheldon Creed	764 (–137)
1	7	Jesse Love	726 (–175)
1	8	Riley Herbst	724 (–177)
	9	Parker Kligerman	704 (–197)
	10	Sammy Smith	662 (–239)
	11	Ryan Sieg	619 (–282)
	12	Shane van Gisbergen	606 (–295)
Official driver's standings

Manufacturers' Championship standings

Pos	Manufacturer	Points
1	Chevrolet	892
2	Toyota	856 (-36)
3	Ford	767 (–125)

- Note: Only the first 12 positions are included for the driver standings.

Previous race: 2024 Focused Health 250 (Atlanta)	NASCAR Xfinity Series; 2024 season	Next race: 2024 Food City 300
