= 2025 Ag-Pro 300 =

11th race of the 2025 NASCAR Xfinity Series

Race details
- Race 11 of 33 of the 2025 NASCAR Xfinity Series
- Date: April 26, 2025
- Official name: 34th Annual Ag-Pro 300
- Location: Talladega Superspeedway in Lincoln, Alabama
- Course: Permanent racing facility
- Course length: 2.66 miles (4.28 km)
- Distance: 113 laps, 300 mi (483 km)
- Scheduled distance: 113 laps, 300 mi (483 km)
- Average speed: 138.180 mph (222.379 km/h)

Pole position
Driver	Jesse Love	Richard Childress Racing
- Time: 52.546

Most laps led
Driver	Jesse Love	Richard Childress Racing
- Laps: 50

Winner
No. 21	Austin Hill	Richard Childress Racing

Television in the United States
- Network: The CW
- Announcers: Adam Alexander, Parker Kligerman, and Jamie McMurray

Radio in the United States
- Radio: MRN

The 2025 Ag-Pro 300 was the 11th stock car race of the 2025 NASCAR Xfinity Series, and the 34rd iteration of the event. The race was held on Saturday, April 26, 2025, at Talladega Superspeedway in Lincoln, Alabama, a 2.66 miles (4.28 km) permanent asphalt quad-oval shaped superspeedway. The race took the scheduled 113 laps to complete.

In a wild race with a controversial ending, Austin Hill, driving for Richard Childress Racing, was declared the winner after leading when the caution came out on the final lap for a vicious crash from Connor Zilisch. Hill finished slightly ahead of Jeb Burton at the time of caution, with Hill's teammate Jesse Love finishing third and rounding out the podium. With his victory, Hill broke the record for the most superspeedway wins in series history, surpassing Tony Stewart and Dale Earnhardt. RCR continued to be a dominant force at superspeedways, with both drivers winning both stages, and leading a combined 69 laps of the race.

== Report ==
=== Background ===
Talladega Superspeedway, the track where the race was held.

Talladega Superspeedway, formerly known as Alabama International Motor Speedway, is a motorsports complex located north of Talladega, Alabama. It is located on the former Anniston Air Force Base in the small city of Lincoln. A tri-oval, the track was constructed in 1969 by the International Speedway Corporation, a business controlled by the France family. Talladega is most known for its steep banking. The track currently hosts NASCAR's Cup Series, Xfinity Series and Craftsman Truck Series. Talladega is the longest NASCAR oval with a length of 2.66-mile-long (4.28 km) tri-oval like the Daytona International Speedway, which is 2.5-mile-long (4.0 km).

==== Entry list ====
- (R) denotes rookie driver.
- (i) denotes driver who is ineligible for series driver points.

#	Driver	Team	Make
00	Sheldon Creed	Haas Factory Team	Ford
1	Carson Kvapil (R)	JR Motorsports	Chevrolet
2	Jesse Love	Richard Childress Racing	Chevrolet
4	Parker Retzlaff	Alpha Prime Racing	Chevrolet
5	Kris Wright	Our Motorsports	Chevrolet
07	Patrick Emerling	SS-Green Light Racing	Chevrolet
7	Justin Allgaier	JR Motorsports	Chevrolet
8	Sammy Smith	JR Motorsports	Chevrolet
10	Daniel Dye (R)	Kaulig Racing	Chevrolet
11	Josh Williams	Kaulig Racing	Chevrolet
14	Garrett Smithley	SS-Green Light Racing	Chevrolet
16	Christian Eckes (R)	Kaulig Racing	Chevrolet
18	William Sawalich (R)	Joe Gibbs Racing	Toyota
19	Aric Almirola	Joe Gibbs Racing	Toyota
20	Brandon Jones	Joe Gibbs Racing	Toyota
21	Austin Hill	Richard Childress Racing	Chevrolet
24	Jeffrey Earnhardt	Sam Hunt Racing	Toyota
25	Harrison Burton	AM Racing	Ford
26	Dean Thompson (R)	Sam Hunt Racing	Toyota
27	Jeb Burton	Jordan Anderson Racing	Chevrolet
28	Kyle Sieg	RSS Racing	Ford
29	Jake Garcia (i)	RSS Racing	Ford
31	Blaine Perkins	Jordan Anderson Racing	Chevrolet
32	Katherine Legge (i)	Jordan Anderson Racing	Chevrolet
35	Greg Van Alst	Joey Gase Motorsports	Chevrolet
39	Ryan Sieg	RSS Racing	Ford
41	Sam Mayer	Haas Factory Team	Ford
42	Anthony Alfredo	Young's Motorsports	Chevrolet
44	Brennan Poole	Alpha Prime Racing	Chevrolet
45	Caesar Bacarella	Alpha Prime Racing	Chevrolet
48	Nick Sanchez (R)	Big Machine Racing	Chevrolet
51	Jeremy Clements	Jeremy Clements Racing	Chevrolet
53	Joey Gase	Joey Gase Motorsports	Chevrolet
54	Taylor Gray (R)	Joe Gibbs Racing	Toyota
66	Mason Maggio	MBM Motorsports	Chevrolet
70	Leland Honeyman	Cope Family Racing	Chevrolet
71	Ryan Ellis	DGM Racing	Chevrolet
87	Austin Green	Jordan Anderson Racing	Chevrolet
88	Connor Zilisch (R)	JR Motorsports	Chevrolet
91	Jesse Iwuji	DGM Racing	Chevrolet
99	Matt DiBenedetto	Viking Motorsports	Chevrolet
Official entry list

== Qualifying ==
Qualifying was held on Friday, April 25, at 4:30 PM CST. Since Talladega Superspeedway is a superspeedway, the qualifying system used is a single-car, single-lap system with two rounds. In the first round, drivers will be on track by themselves and will have one lap to set a time. The fastest ten drivers from the first round move on to the second and final round. Whoever sets the fastest time in Round 2 will win the pole.

Only one round of qualifying was contested due to the threat of incoming rain. Jesse Love, driving for Richard Childress Racing, would score the pole for the race, with a lap of 52.546, and a speed of 182.240 mph (293.287 km/h).

Three drivers failed to qualify: Garrett Smithley, Austin Green, and Jake Garcia.

=== Qualifying results ===
Pos.	#	Driver	Team	Make	Time	Speed
1	2	Jesse Love	Richard Childress Racing	Chevrolet	52.546	182.240
2	21	Austin Hill	Richard Childress Racing	Chevrolet	52.734	181.591
3	7	Justin Allgaier	JR Motorsports	Chevrolet	52.922	180.946
4	53	Joey Gase	Joey Gase Motorsports	Chevrolet	52.938	180.891
5	27	Jeb Burton	Jordan Anderson Racing	Chevrolet	52.940	180.884
6	54	Taylor Gray (R)	Joe Gibbs Racing	Toyota	52.949	180.853
7	11	Josh Williams	Kaulig Racing	Chevrolet	52.973	180.771
8	10	Daniel Dye (R)	Kaulig Racing	Chevrolet	53.023	180.601
9	71	Ryan Ellis	DGM Racing	Chevrolet	53.043	180.533
10	51	Jeremy Clements	Jeremy Clements Racing	Chevrolet	53.060	180.475
11	00	Sheldon Creed	Haas Factory Team	Ford	53.066	180.455
12	99	Matt DiBenedetto	Viking Motorsports	Chevrolet	53.066	180.455
13	88	Connor Zilisch (R)	JR Motorsports	Chevrolet	53.070	180.441
14	8	Sammy Smith	JR Motorsports	Chevrolet	53.102	180.332
15	16	Christian Eckes (R)	Kaulig Racing	Chevrolet	53.139	180.207
16	20	Brandon Jones	Joe Gibbs Racing	Toyota	53.167	180.112
17	19	Aric Almirola	Joe Gibbs Racing	Toyota	53.242	179.858
18	18	William Sawalich (R)	Joe Gibbs Racing	Toyota	53.247	179.841
19	42	Anthony Alfredo	Young's Motorsports	Chevrolet	53.257	179.807
20	1	Carson Kvapil (R)	JR Motorsports	Chevrolet	53.258	179.804
21	70	Leland Honeyman	Cope Family Racing	Chevrolet	53.266	179.777
22	26	Dean Thompson (R)	Sam Hunt Racing	Toyota	53.278	179.736
23	48	Nick Sanchez (R)	Big Machine Racing	Chevrolet	53.300	179.662
24	5	Kris Wright	Our Motorsports	Chevrolet	53.319	179.598
25	35	Greg Van Alst	Joey Gase Motorsports	Chevrolet	53.325	179.578
26	28	Kyle Sieg	RSS Racing	Ford	53.332	179.554
27	32	Katherine Legge (i)	Jordan Anderson Racing	Chevrolet	53.336	179.541
28	07	Patrick Emerling	SS-Green Light Racing	Chevrolet	53.348	179.501
29	25	Harrison Burton	AM Racing	Ford	53.355	179.477
30	24	Jeffrey Earnhardt	Sam Hunt Racing	Toyota	53.366	179.440
31	31	Blaine Perkins	Jordan Anderson Racing	Chevrolet	53.407	179.302
32	66	Mason Maggio	MBM Motorsports	Chevrolet	53.410	179.292
Qualified by owner's points
33	4	Parker Retzlaff	Alpha Prime Racing	Chevrolet	53.411	179.289
34	41	Sam Mayer	Haas Factory Team	Ford	53.502	178.984
35	39	Ryan Sieg	RSS Racing	Ford	53.534	178.877
36	91	Jesse Iwuji	DGM Racing	Chevrolet	53.540	178.857
37	44	Brennan Poole	Alpha Prime Racing	Chevrolet	53.727	178.234
38	45	Caesar Bacarella	Alpha Prime Racing	Chevrolet	54.898	174.433
Failed to qualify
39	14	Garrett Smithley	SS-Green Light Racing	Chevrolet	53.520	178.924
40	87	Austin Green	Jordan Anderson Racing	Chevrolet	53.662	178.450
41	29	Jake Garcia (i)	RSS Racing	Ford	53.667	178.434
Official qualifying results
Official starting lineup

== Race results ==
Stage 1 Laps: 25

Pos.	#	Driver	Team	Make	Pts
1	2	Jesse Love	Richard Childress Racing	Chevrolet	10
2	21	Austin Hill	Richard Childress Racing	Chevrolet	9
3	00	Sheldon Creed	Haas Factory Team	Ford	8
4	16	Christian Eckes (R)	Kaulig Racing	Chevrolet	7
5	39	Ryan Sieg	RSS Racing	Ford	6
6	11	Josh Williams	Kaulig Racing	Chevrolet	5
7	48	Nick Sanchez (R)	Big Machine Racing	Chevrolet	4
8	25	Harrison Burton	AM Racing	Ford	3
9	7	Justin Allgaier	JR Motorsports	Chevrolet	2
10	27	Jeb Burton	Jordan Anderson Racing	Chevrolet	1

Stage 2 Laps: 25

Pos.	#	Driver	Team	Make	Pts
1	21	Austin Hill	Richard Childress Racing	Chevrolet	10
2	2	Jesse Love	Richard Childress Racing	Chevrolet	9
3	19	Aric Almirola	Joe Gibbs Racing	Toyota	8
4	48	Nick Sanchez (R)	Big Machine Racing	Chevrolet	7
5	8	Sammy Smith	JR Motorsports	Chevrolet	6
6	88	Connor Zilisch (R)	JR Motorsports	Chevrolet	5
7	27	Jeb Burton	Jordan Anderson Racing	Chevrolet	4
8	7	Justin Allgaier	JR Motorsports	Chevrolet	3
9	18	William Sawalich (R)	Joe Gibbs Racing	Toyota	2
10	25	Harrison Burton	AM Racing	Ford	1

Stage 3 Laps: 63

On the final lap, Jesse Love turned race leader Connor Zilisch right before the entrance to turn 3, and NASCAR threw the caution. Austin Hill was barely ahead of Jeb Burton at the time of caution, so Hill was declared the winner.

Fin	St	#	Driver	Team	Make	Laps	Led	Status	Pts
1	2	21	Austin Hill	Richard Childress Racing	Chevrolet	113	19	Running	59
2	5	27	Jeb Burton	Jordan Anderson Racing	Chevrolet	113	7	Running	40
3	1	2	Jesse Love	Richard Childress Racing	Chevrolet	113	50	Running	53
4	3	7	Justin Allgaier	JR Motorsports	Chevrolet	113	1	Running	38
5	12	99	Matt DiBenedetto	Viking Motorsports	Chevrolet	113	0	Running	32
6	19	42	Anthony Alfredo	Young's Motorsports	Chevrolet	113	1	Running	31
7	31	31	Blaine Perkins	Jordan Anderson Racing	Chevrolet	113	0	Running	30
8	29	25	Harrison Burton	AM Racing	Ford	113	0	Running	33
9	11	00	Sheldon Creed	Haas Factory Team	Ford	113	9	Running	36
10	8	10	Daniel Dye (R)	Kaulig Racing	Chevrolet	113	0	Running	27
11	6	54	Taylor Gray (R)	Joe Gibbs Racing	Toyota	113	0	Running	26
12	28	07	Patrick Emerling	SS-Green Light Racing	Chevrolet	113	1	Running	25
13	21	70	Leland Honeyman	Cope Family Racing	Chevrolet	113	0	Running	24
14	34	41	Sam Mayer	Haas Factory Team	Ford	113	0	Running	23
15	23	48	Nick Sanchez (R)	Big Machine Racing	Chevrolet	113	1	Running	33
16	9	71	Ryan Ellis	DGM Racing	Chevrolet	113	0	Running	21
17	20	1	Carson Kvapil (R)	JR Motorsports	Chevrolet	113	0	Running	20
18	22	26	Dean Thompson (R)	Sam Hunt Racing	Toyota	113	0	Running	19
19	37	44	Brennan Poole	Alpha Prime Racing	Chevrolet	113	0	Running	18
20	36	91	Jesse Iwuji	DGM Racing	Chevrolet	113	0	Running	17
21	4	53	Joey Gase	Joey Gase Motorsports	Chevrolet	113	0	Running	16
22	32	66	Mason Maggio	MBM Motorsports	Chevrolet	113	0	Running	15
23	26	28	Kyle Sieg	RSS Racing	Ford	113	0	Running	14
24	24	5	Kris Wright	Our Motorsports	Chevrolet	113	0	Running	13
25	15	16	Christian Eckes (R)	Kaulig Racing	Chevrolet	113	2	Running	19
26	10	51	Jeremy Clements	Jeremy Clements Racing	Chevrolet	113	1	Running	12
27	13	88	Connor Zilisch (R)	JR Motorsports	Chevrolet	112	9	Accident	15
28	16	20	Brandon Jones	Joe Gibbs Racing	Toyota	112	8	Running	9
29	7	11	Josh Williams	Kaulig Racing	Chevrolet	111	0	Running	13
30	38	45	Caesar Bacarella	Alpha Prime Racing	Chevrolet	108	0	Running	7
31	14	8	Sammy Smith	JR Motorsports	Chevrolet	107	1	Running	12
32	30	24	Jeffrey Earnhardt	Sam Hunt Racing	Toyota	102	0	Accident	5
33	17	19	Aric Almirola	Joe Gibbs Racing	Toyota	100	0	Accident	12
34	27	32	Katherine Legge (i)	Jordan Anderson Racing	Chevrolet	100	1	Accident	0
35	25	35	Greg Van Alst	Joey Gase Motorsports	Chevrolet	80	2	Accident	2
36	35	39	Ryan Sieg	RSS Racing	Ford	78	0	Accident	7
37	18	18	William Sawalich (R)	Joe Gibbs Racing	Toyota	75	0	Engine	3
38	33	4	Parker Retzlaff	Alpha Prime Racing	Chevrolet	52	0	Accident	1
Official race results

== Standings after the race ==
Drivers' Championship standings

	Pos	Driver	Points
	1	Justin Allgaier	449
1	2	Austin Hill	370 (–79)
1	3	Sam Mayer	347 (–102)
	4	Jesse Love	340 (–109)
	5	Carson Kvapil	306 (–143)
1	6	Connor Zilisch	299 (–150)
1	7	Brandon Jones	293 (–156)
	8	Sammy Smith	293 (–156)
2	9	Jeb Burton	291 (–158)
	10	Sheldon Creed	290 (–159)
2	11	Ryan Sieg	284 (–165)
	12	Harrison Burton	276 (–173)
Official driver's standings

Manufacturers' Championship standings

Pos	Manufacturer	Points
1	Chevrolet	430
2	Toyota	362 (–68)
3	Ford	351 (–79)

- Note: Only the first 12 positions are included for the driver standings.

Previous race: 2025 North Carolina Education Lottery 250	NASCAR Xfinity Series; 2025 season	Next race: 2025 Andy's Frozen Custard 300
