= Austin Green =

American racing driver (born 2001)

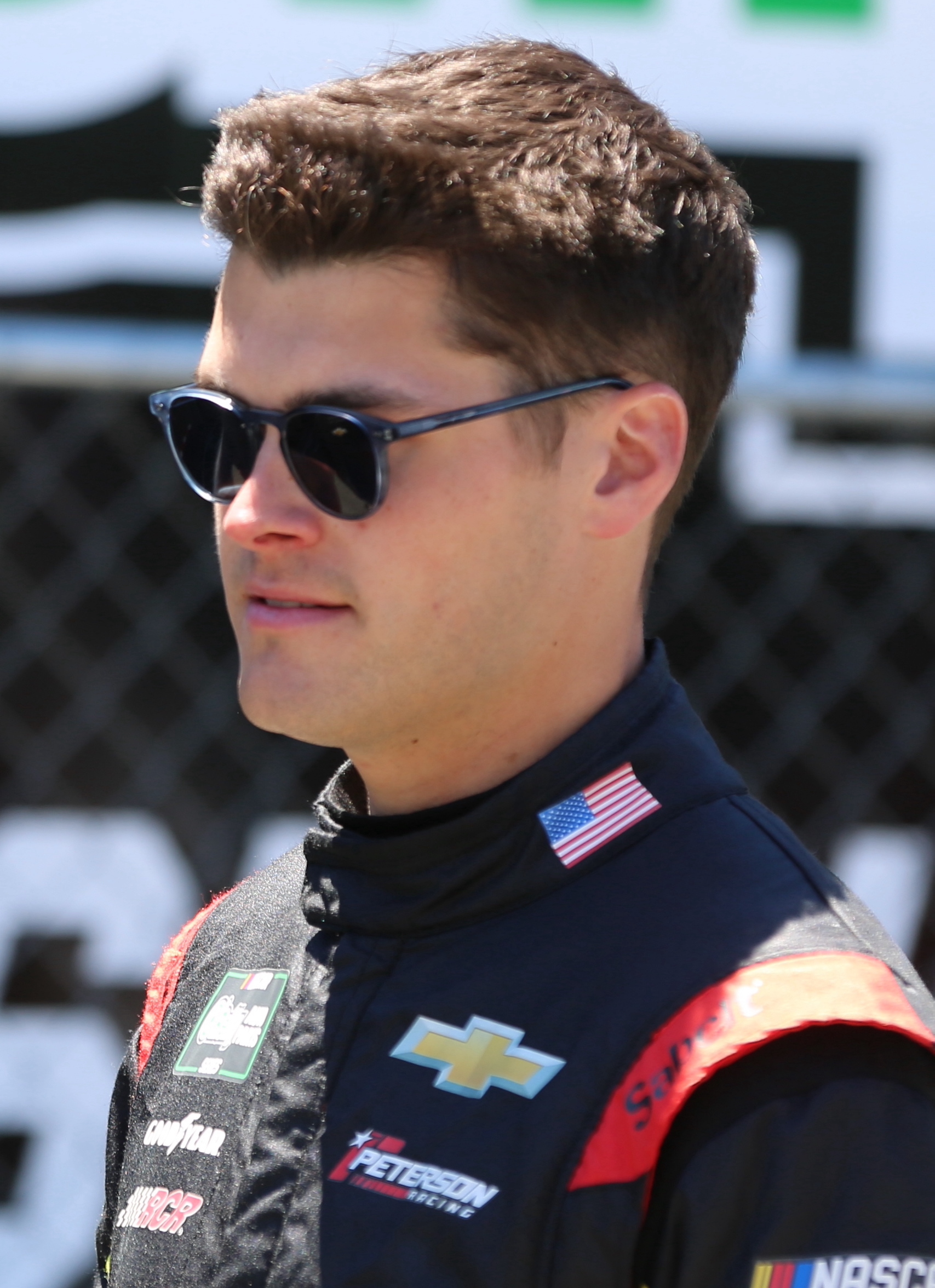
- Green at Sonoma Raceway in 2026
- Born: Austin Chase Green; March 26, 2001 (age 25); Concord, North Carolina, U.S.

NASCAR O'Reilly Auto Parts Series career
- 40 races run over 3 years
- 2026 position: 28th
- Best finish: 28th (2026)
- First race: 2024 Focused Health 250 (COTA)
- Last race: 2026 Blue Cross NC 300 (Charlotte)
Wins	Top tens	Poles
0	11	0

NASCAR FedEx Freight Truck Series career
- 1 race run over 1 year
- 2026 position: 102nd
- Best finish: 102nd (2026)
- First race: 2026 Love's RV Stop 225 (Talladega)
Wins	Top tens	Poles
0	1	0

ARCA Menards Series career
- 2 races run over 2 years
- Best finish: 57th (2020)
- First race: 2020 Menards 200 (Toledo)
- Last race: 2025 General Tire 150 (Charlotte)
- First win: 2025 General Tire 150 (Charlotte)
Wins	Top tens	Poles
1	2	0

ARCA Menards Series East career
- 1 race run over 1 year
- Best finish: 56th (2025)
- First race: 2025 Rockingham ARCA 125 (Rockingham)
Wins	Top tens	Poles
0	0	0
- Statistics up to date as of November 7, 2026.

Austin Chase Green (born March 26, 2001) is an American professional stock car racing driver. He last competed part-time in the NASCAR O'Reilly Auto Parts Series, driving the No. 87 Chevrolet Camaro SS for Peterson Racing and part-time in the NASCAR Craftsman Truck Series, driving the No. 77 Chevrolet Silverado RST for Spire Motorsports.

== Racing career ==
=== Early career ===
Green began racing go-karts at four years old, before transitioning to bandoleros when he was eight. He eventually moved into legends cars at age thirteen, winning numerous races, including the Legends Young Lions Winter Heat championship at Charlotte Motor Speedway.

=== Trans-Am Series ===
Green ran part-time in the SCCA Trans-Am TA2 Pro-Am Series from 2021 to 2022, driving for Team SLR and M1 Race Cars, earning a best finish of twelfth at Watkins Glen International in 2022. He ran full-time in the series in 2023, driving the No. 89 car for Peterson Racing Group. He earned four podiums, five top-fives, and seven top-tens, ending the season with a fifth-place points finish. On January 9, 2024, he announced that he would return to Peterson Racing for the 2024 season, along with running a part-time Xfinity Series schedule for the team.

=== ARCA Menards Series ===
Green made his ARCA Menards Series debut in the 2020 Menards 200 at Toledo Speedway, driving the No. 74 car for Visconti Motorsports. Green started eleventh and finished seventh. In 2025, he would drive part-time with Pinnacle Racing Group in the ARCA Menards Series and the ARCA Menards Series East, where he would earn a win at Charlotte.

=== O'Reilly Auto Parts Series ===
==== 2024: Series debut ====
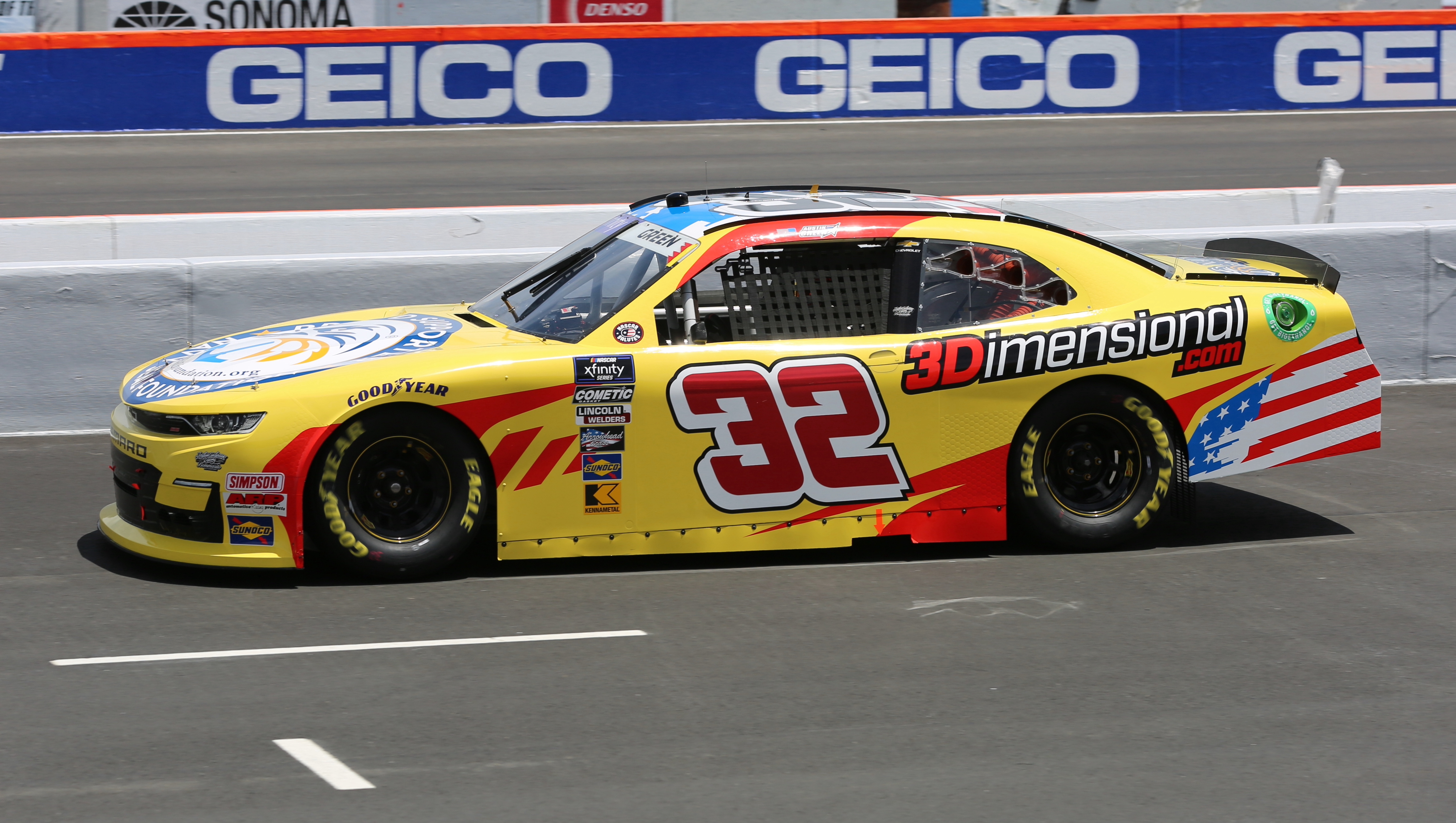
Green's No. 32 car at Sonoma Raceway in 2024

On January 9, 2024, Green announced that he would run part-time in the NASCAR Xfinity Series in 2024, driving the No. 87 car for Peterson Racing Group in nine races. In his first start at Circuit of the Americas, Green instead drove the No. 32 Chevrolet for Jordan Anderson Racing in collaboration with Peterson, and would finish in seventh place. This collaboration allowed PRG to share owner points with JAR to allow Green a better chance to qualify for races as the No. 32 had attempted all four races thus far in the season, and the No. 87 car had not attempted any races. The two teams would end up collaborating for all of Green's remaining starts, and he would end up not driving the No. 87 at all in 2024. Green finished in fifteenth in his second race at Portland before getting a career-best finish of fourth at the next event at Sonoma. In his next race at the Chicago Street Course, he finished in tenth, and at his next race at Watkins Glen, he finished in eleventh. He then made his first oval start at Bristol, where he finished in 38th after being involved in a crash with teammate Parker Retzlaff. His last start with the team for that year came at the Charlotte Motor Speedway ROVAL, where he finished in 30th due to engine issues. He then drove for SS-Green Light Racing in the No. 14 Chevrolet at Homestead, where he finished in 29th place.

==== 2025: Best career finish ====
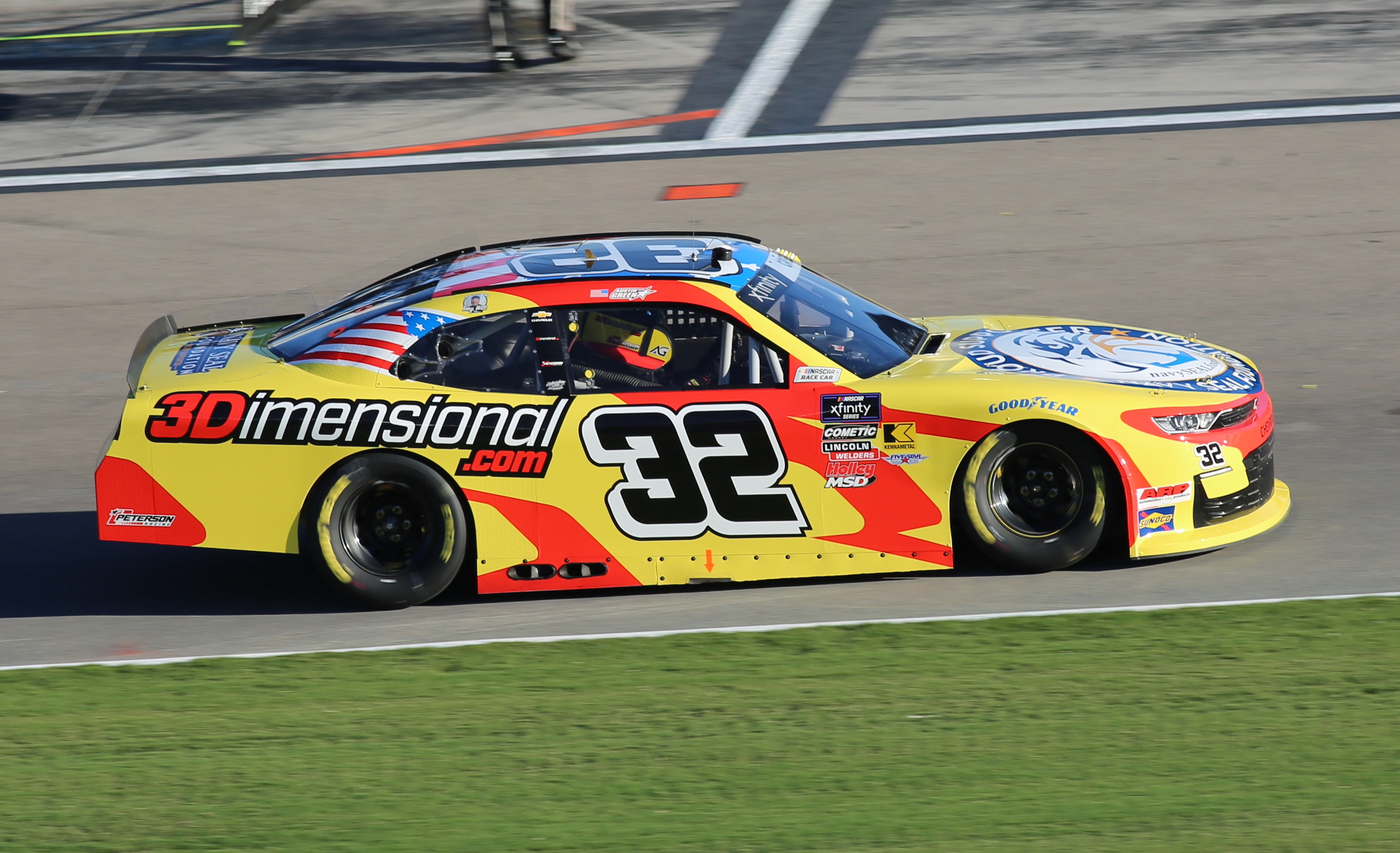
Green's No. 32 car at Las Vegas Motor Speedway in 2025

In 2025, Green returned to JAR in 2025, this time for fifteen races. Across the year, he finished in the top-ten five times, including a career best finish of second at the Charlotte Roval.

==== 2026: Scheduled full-time for Peterson ====
On December 5, 2025, it was announced that Green would run full-time in the now-renamed O'Reilly Auto Parts Series for the 2026 season, driving the No. 87 Chevrolet for Peterson Racing, which split from JAR after a two-year collaboration with them to jointly field Green's entries in the series.

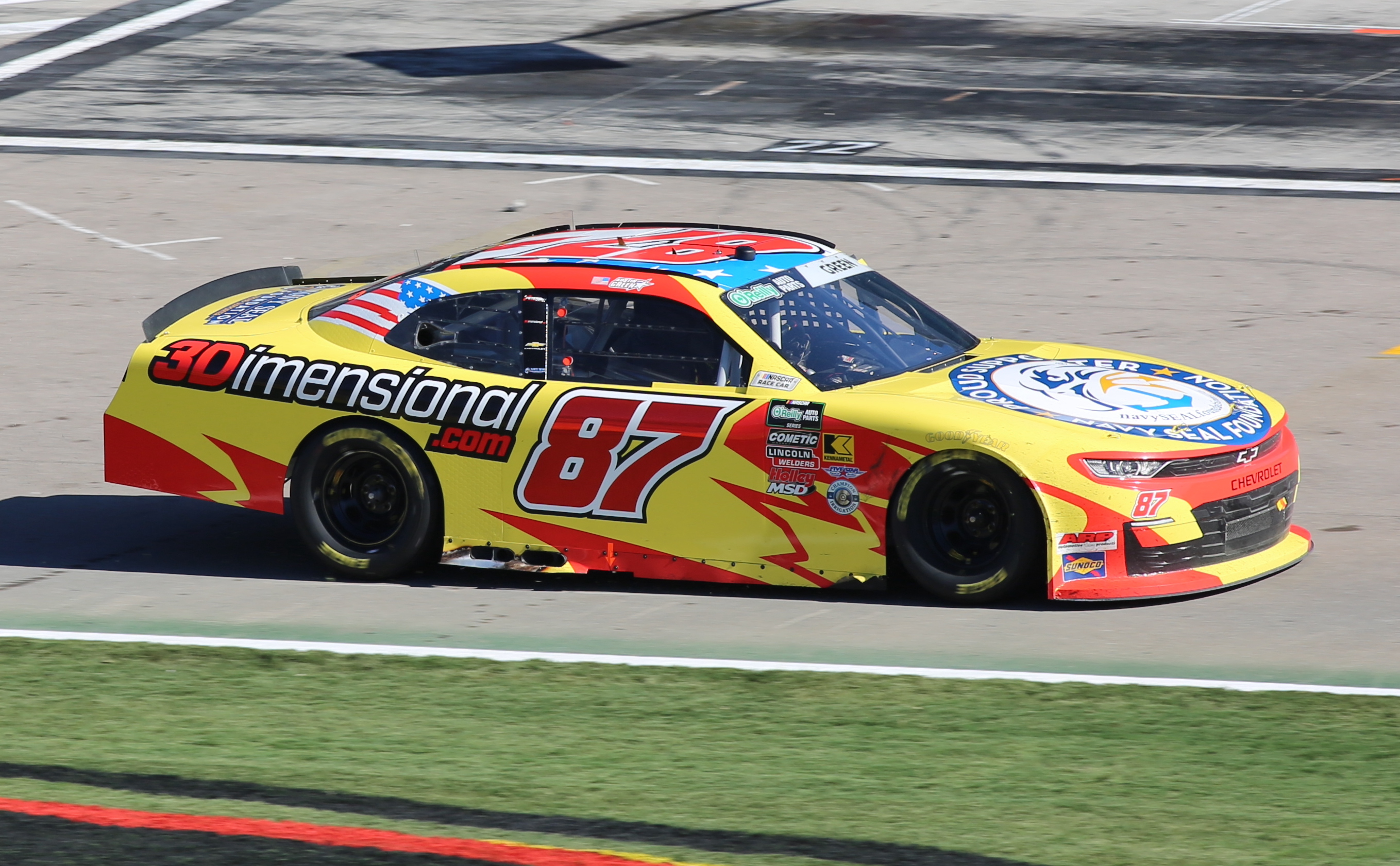
Green's No. 87 car at Las Vegas Motor Speedway in 2026

Green started the 2026 season with a 22nd place finish at Daytona. He and the team struggled until he scored top-ten finished at Talladega, and Watkins Glen. Green was sitting 24th in points, when on June 1, the team announced that Nick Sanchez would drive for them in four races, with Green doing Coronado and Sonoma. On July 24, Peterson announced that Sanchez would drive for them in five more races, making Green's future with the team unknown.

On October 7, Green announced on Motorstardom, that he would compete in the next three events from Charlotte through Talladega in the No. 87 to wrap up the season. However on October 15, Peterson announced that Sanchez would return to the No. 87 at Phoenix instead of Green. On October 19, Lee Pulliam announced he would drive the No. 87 at Talladega and Martinsville, with Sanchez doing Homestead. On October 21, after the team faced backlash following Pulliam's announcement that he would be running Talladega, it was confirmed that Peterson let go of Green.

=== Craftsman Truck Series ===
On October 15, 2026, it was announced that Green will make his NASCAR Craftsman Truck Series debut for Spire Motorsports, driving their No. 77 at Talladega.

== Personal life ==
Green is the son of former NASCAR driver and current official, David Green and nephew of Jeff Green and Mark Green.

== Motorsports career results ==
=== Racing career summary ===
Season	Series	Team	Races	Wins	Top 5	Top 10	Points	Position
2020	ARCA Menards Series	Visconti Motorsports	1	0	0	1	37	57th
2021	Trans-Am Series - TA2	Team SLR	1	0	0	0	1	60th
2022	Trans-Am Series - TA2	Team SLR	3	0	0	0	30	31st
2023	Trans-Am Series - TA2	Peterson Racing Group	13	0	5	7	816	5th
2024	NASCAR Xfinity Series	Jordan Anderson Racing	6	0	1	3	154	34th
2024	NASCAR Xfinity Series	SS-Green Light Racing	1	0	0	0	154	34th
2024	Trans-Am Series - TA2	Peterson Racing Group	6	0	2	5	454	12th
2025	ASA STARS National Tour	Day Enterprises	1	0	0	0	5	79th
2025	CARS Late Model Stock Car Tour	Matt Piercy Racing	1	0	0	0	17	87th
2025	ARCA Menards Series East	Pinnacle Racing Group	1	0	0	0	32	56th
2025	ARCA Menards Series	Pinnacle Racing Group	1	1	1	1	48	81st
2025	NASCAR Xfinity Series	Jordan Anderson Racing	13	0	1	5	212	33rd
2025	Trans-Am Series - TA2	Peterson Racing Group	1	0	1	1	93	32nd
2026	NASCAR O'Reilly Auto Parts Series	Peterson Racing	18	0	0	3	262*	28th*
2026	NASCAR Craftsmab Truck Series	Spire Motorsports					0	NC†

^{†} As Green was a guest driver, he was ineligible for championship points.

=== NASCAR ===
(key) (Bold – Pole position awarded by qualifying time. Italics – Pole position earned by points standings or practice time. * – Most laps led.)

==== O'Reilly Auto Parts Series ====
NASCAR O'Reilly Auto Parts Series results
Year	Team	No.	Make	1	2	3	4	5	6	7	8	9	10	11	12	13	14	15	16	17	18	19	20	21	22	23	24	25	26	27	28	29	30	31	32	33	NOAPSC	Pts	Ref
2024	Jordan Anderson Racing	32	Chevy	DAY	ATL	LVS	PHO	COA; 7	RCH	MAR	TEX	TAL	DOV	DAR	CLT	PIR; 15	SON; 4	IOW	NHA	NSH	CSC; 10	POC	IND	MCH	DAY	DAR	ATL	GLN; 11	BRI; 38	KAN	TAL	ROV; 30	LVS				34th	154	
2024	SS-Green Light Racing	14	Chevy																															HOM; 29	MAR	PHO	34th	154	
2025	Jordan Anderson Racing	32	Chevy	DAY	ATL	COA; 26	PHO	LVS; 36	HOM	MAR	DAR; DNQ	BRI						MXC; 7	POC	ATL	CSC; 9	SON; 11	DOV	IND	IOW	GLN; 7	DAY	PIR; 8	GTW	BRI; 31	KAN; 29		LVS; 31	TAL	MAR; 24	PHO	33rd	212	
2025	Jordan Anderson Racing	87	Chevy										CAR; 30	TAL; DNQ	TEX	CLT	NSH															ROV; 2					33rd	212	
2026	Peterson Racing	87	Chevy	DAY; 22	ATL; 21	COA; 33	PHO; 22	LVS; 25	DAR; 28	MAR; 29	CAR; 33	BRI; 35	KAN; 32	TAL; 10	TEX; 35	GLN; 9	DOV; 12	CLT; 16	NSH; 30	POC	COR; 8	SON; 12	CHI	ATL	IND	IOW	DAY	DAR	GTW	BRI	LVS	CLT; 23	PHO	TAL	MAR	HOM	28th	276	

==== Craftsman Truck Series ====
NASCAR Craftsman Truck Series results
Year	Team	No.	Make	1	2	3	4	5	6	7	8	9	10	11	12	13	14	15	16	17	18	19	20	21	22	23	24	25	NCTC	Pts	Ref
2026	Spire Motorsports	77	Chevy	DAY	ATL	STP	DAR	CAR	BRI	TEX	GLN	DOV	CLT	NSH	MCH	COR	LRP	NWS	IRP	RCH	NHA	BRI	KAN	CLT	PHO	TAL; 3	MAR	HOM	102nd	0^{1}	

^{*} Season still in progress
^{1} Ineligible for series points

=== ARCA Menards Series ===
(key) (Bold – Pole position awarded by qualifying time. Italics – Pole position earned by points standings or practice time. * – Most laps led.)

ARCA Menards Series results
Year	Team	No.	Make	1	2	3	4	5	6	7	8	9	10	11	12	13	14	15	16	17	18	19	20	AMSC	Pts	Ref
2020	Visconti Motorsports	74	Chevy	DAY	PHO	TAL	POC	IRP	KEN	IOW	KAN	TOL	TOL; 7	MCH	DRC	GTW	L44	TOL	BRI	WIN	MEM	ISF	KAN	57th	37	
2025	Pinnacle Racing Group	82	Chevy	DAY	PHO	TAL	KAN	CLT; 1*	MCH	BLN	ELK	LRP	DOV	IRP	IOW	GLN	ISF	MAD	DSF	BRI	SLM	KAN	TOL	81st	48	

==== ARCA Menards Series East ====
ARCA Menards Series East results
Year	Team	No.	Make	1	2	3	4	5	6	7	8	AMSEC	Pts	Ref
2025	Pinnacle Racing Group	28	Chevy	FIF	CAR; 12	NSV	FRS	DOV	IRP	IOW	BRI	56th	32	

=== CARS Late Model Stock Car Tour ===
(key) (Bold – Pole position awarded by qualifying time. Italics – Pole position earned by points standings or practice time. * – Most laps led. ** – All laps led.)

CARS Late Model Stock Car Tour results
Year	Team	No.	Make	1	2	3	4	5	6	7	8	9	10	11	12	13	14	15	CLMSCTC	Pts	Ref
2025	Matt Piercy Racing	7	N/A	AAS	WCS	CDL	OCS	ACE; 25	NWS	LGY	DOM	CRW	HCY	AND	FLC	SBO	TCM	NWS	87th	17	

=== ASA STARS National Tour ===
(key) (Bold – Pole position awarded by qualifying time. Italics – Pole position earned by points standings or practice time. * – Most laps led. ** – All laps led.)

ASA STARS National Tour results
Year	Team	No.	Make	1	2	3	4	5	6	7	8	9	10	11	12	ASNTC	Pts	Ref
2025	Day Enterprises	16	Chevy	NSM	FIF	DOM	HCY	NPS	MAD	SLG	AND	OWO	TOL	WIN	NSV; DNS	79th	5	
