= 2025 Blue Cross NC 250 =

29th race of the 2025 NASCAR Xfinity Series

Race details
- Race 29 of 33 of the 2025 NASCAR Xfinity Series
- Date: October 4, 2025
- Location: Charlotte Motor Speedway in Concord, North Carolina
- Course: Permanent racing facility
- Course length: 2.320 miles (3.734 km)
- Distance: 68 laps, 155.04 mi (249.51 km)
- Scheduled distance: 67 laps, 152.76 mi (245.84 km)
- Average speed: 72.628 mph (116.883 km/h)

Pole position
| Driver | Connor Zilisch | JR Motorsports |
- Time: 1:25.054

Most laps led
| Driver | Connor Zilisch | JR Motorsports |
- Laps: 61

Winner
| No. 88 | Connor Zilisch | JR Motorsports |

Television in the United States
- Network: CW
- Announcers: Adam Alexander, Parker Kligerman, and Jamie McMurray

Radio in the United States
- Radio: PRN

The 2025 Blue Cross NC 250 was the 29th stock car race of the 2025 NASCAR Xfinity Series, the third and final race of the Round of 12, and the 8th iteration of the event. The race was held on Saturday, October 4, 2025, at the Charlotte Motor Speedway roval layout in Concord, North Carolina, a 2.320 miles (3.734 km) permanent road course. The race was contested over 68 laps, extended from 67 laps due to a green-white-checkered finish.

In a wild race, Connor Zilisch, driving for JR Motorsports, would continue his road course prowess, winning the first stage and leading a race-high 61 laps from the pole position to earn his 11th career NASCAR Xfinity Series win, and his 10th of the season. To fill out the podium, Austin Green, driving for Jordan Anderson Racing, would finish a career-best 2nd place, and Sammy Smith, driving for JR Motorsports, would finish in 3rd, respectively.

Following the race, Taylor Gray, Nick Sanchez, Austin Hill, and Harrison Burton were eliminated from playoff contention. Zilisch, Justin Allgaier, Brandon Jones, Sam Mayer, Jesse Love, Smith, Carson Kvapil, and Sheldon Creed would advance into the Round of 8.

== Report ==
=== Background ===
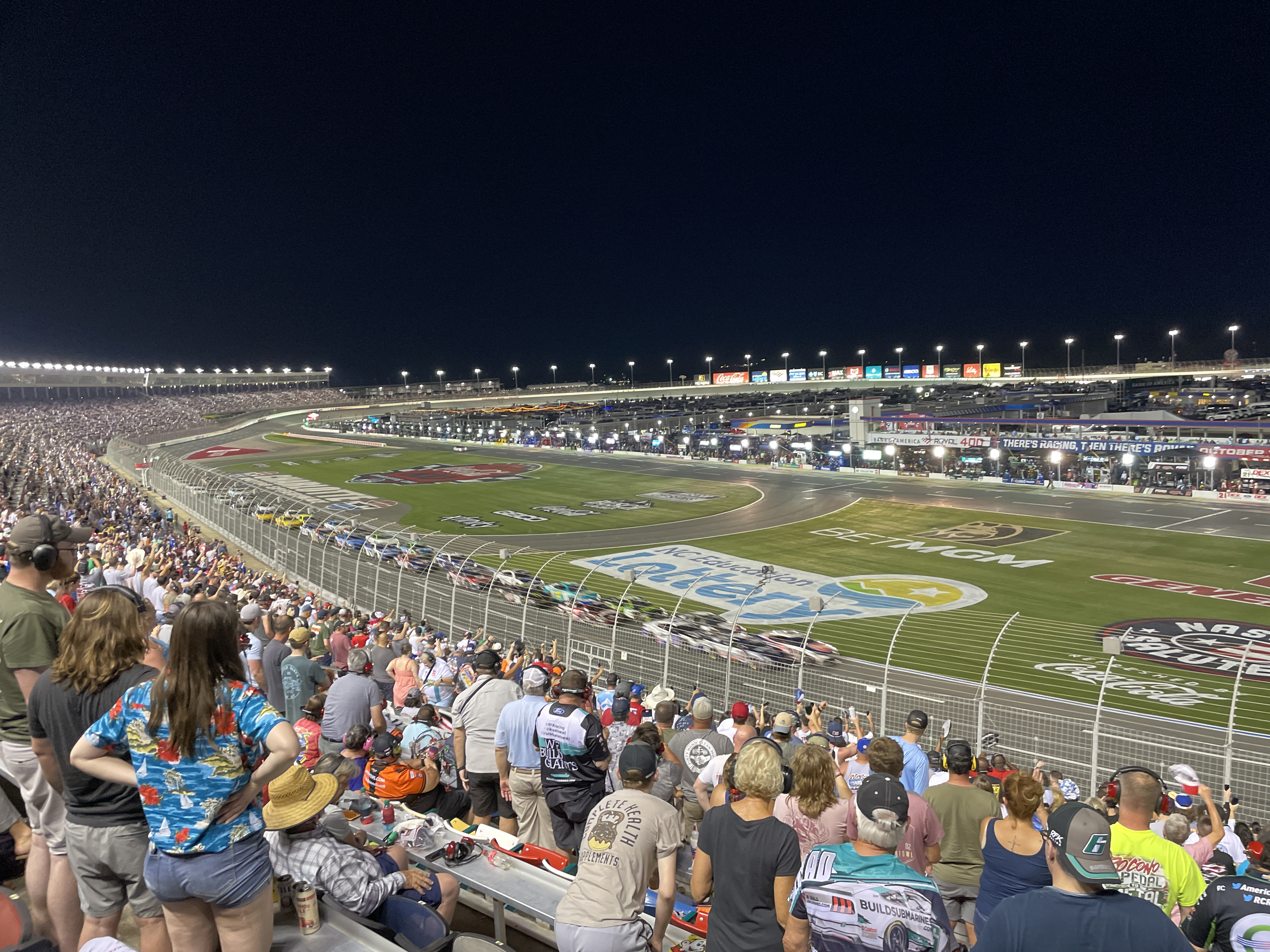
Charlotte Motor Speedway, the track where the race will be held.

Since 2018, deviating from past NASCAR events at Charlotte, the race will utilize a road course configuration of Charlotte Motor Speedway, promoted and trademarked as the "Roval". The course is 2.28 miles (3.67 km) in length and features 17 turns, utilizing the infield road course and portions of the oval track. The race will be contested over a scheduled distance of 109 laps, 400 kilometres (250 mi).

During July 2018 tests on the road course, concerns were raised over drivers "cheating" the backstretch chicane on the course. The chicanes were modified with additional tire barriers and rumble strips in order to encourage drivers to properly drive through them, and NASCAR will enforce drive-through penalties on drivers who illegally "short-cut" parts of the course. The chicanes will not be used during restarts. In the summer of 2019, the bus stop on the backstretch was changed and deepened, becoming a permanent part of the circuit, compared to the previous year where it was improvised.

If a driver fails to legally make the backstretch bus stop, the driver must skip the frontstretch chicane and make a complete stop by the dotted line on the exit before being allowed to continue. A driver who misses the frontstretch chicane must stop before the exit.

On May 26, 2024, it was announced that the Charlotte Roval would get a redesign, featuring an updated infield road course which includes an extension of the straightaway after turn 5, a new turn 6, and a sharper hairpin for turn 7, in addition the apex for turn 16 on the final chicane was made tighter.

=== Entry list ===
- (R) denotes rookie driver.
- (i) denotes driver who is ineligible for series driver points.
- (P) denotes playoff driver.
- (OP) denotes owner's playoff car.

| # | Driver | Team | Make |
|---|---|---|---|
| 00 | Sheldon Creed (P) | Haas Factory Team | Ford |
| 1 | Carson Kvapil (P) (R) | JR Motorsports | Chevrolet |
| 2 | Jesse Love (P) | Richard Childress Racing | Chevrolet |
| 4 | Parker Retzlaff | Alpha Prime Racing | Chevrolet |
| 07 | Alex Labbé | SS-Green Light Racing | Chevrolet |
| 7 | Justin Allgaier (P) | JR Motorsports | Chevrolet |
| 8 | Sammy Smith (P) | JR Motorsports | Chevrolet |
| 9 | Connor Mosack (i) | JR Motorsports | Chevrolet |
| 10 | Daniel Dye (R) | Kaulig Racing | Chevrolet |
| 11 | Daniel Hemric (i) | Kaulig Racing | Chevrolet |
| 14 | Garrett Smithley | SS-Green Light Racing | Chevrolet |
| 16 | Christian Eckes (R) | Kaulig Racing | Chevrolet |
| 17 | Corey Day | Hendrick Motorsports | Chevrolet |
| 18 | William Sawalich (R) | Joe Gibbs Racing | Toyota |
| 19 | Aric Almirola (OP) | Joe Gibbs Racing | Toyota |
| 20 | Brandon Jones (P) | Joe Gibbs Racing | Toyota |
| 21 | Austin Hill (P) | Richard Childress Racing | Chevrolet |
| 24 | Kaz Grala (i) | Sam Hunt Racing | Toyota |
| 25 | Harrison Burton (P) | AM Racing | Ford |
| 26 | Dean Thompson (R) | Sam Hunt Racing | Toyota |
| 27 | Jeb Burton | Jordan Anderson Racing | Chevrolet |
| 28 | Kyle Sieg | RSS Racing | Ford |
| 31 | Blaine Perkins | Jordan Anderson Racing | Chevrolet |
| 32 | Andrew Patterson | Jordan Anderson Racing | Chevrolet |
| 35 | Austin J. Hill | Joey Gase Motorsports | Chevrolet |
| 39 | Ryan Sieg | RSS Racing | Ford |
| 41 | Sam Mayer (P) | Haas Factory Team | Ford |
| 42 | Anthony Alfredo | Young's Motorsports | Chevrolet |
| 44 | Brennan Poole | Alpha Prime Racing | Chevrolet |
| 45 | Josh Williams | Alpha Prime Racing | Chevrolet |
| 48 | Nick Sanchez (P) (R) | Big Machine Racing | Chevrolet |
| 50 | Preston Pardus | Pardus Racing | Chevrolet |
| 51 | Jeremy Clements | Jeremy Clements Racing | Chevrolet |
| 53 | Sage Karam | Joey Gase Motorsports | Toyota |
| 54 | Taylor Gray (P) (R) | Joe Gibbs Racing | Toyota |
| 70 | Thomas Annunziata | Cope Family Racing | Chevrolet |
| 71 | Ryan Ellis | DGM Racing | Chevrolet |
| 87 | Austin Green | Jordan Anderson Racing | Chevrolet |
| 88 | Connor Zilisch (P) (R) | JR Motorsports | Chevrolet |
| 91 | Josh Bilicki | DGM Racing | Chevrolet |
| 92 | Leland Honeyman | DGM Racing | Chevrolet |
| 99 | Matt DiBenedetto | Viking Motorsports | Chevrolet |
Official entry list

== Practice ==
The first and only practice session was held on Saturday, October 4, at 11:30 AM EST, and would last for 50 minutes. Connor Zilisch, driving for JR Motorsports, would set the fastest time in the session, with a lap of 1:25.573, and a speed of 95.918 mph (154.365 km/h).

| Pos. | # | Driver | Team | Make | Time | Speed |
|---|---|---|---|---|---|---|
| 1 | 88 | Connor Zilisch (P) (R) | JR Motorsports | Chevrolet | 1:25.573 | 95.918 |
| 2 | 1 | Carson Kvapil (P) (R) | JR Motorsports | Chevrolet | 1:26.064 | 95.371 |
| 3 | 9 | Connor Mosack (i) | JR Motorsports | Chevrolet | 1:26.075 | 95.359 |
Full practice results

== Qualifying ==
Qualifying was held on Saturday, October 4, at 12:40 PM EST. Since the Charlotte Motor Speedway roval layout is a road course, the qualifying procedure used is a two-group system, with one round. Drivers were separated into two groups, A and B. Each driver would have multiple laps to set a time. Whoever sets the fastest time between both groups will win the pole.

Under a 2021 rule change, the timing line in road course qualifying is "not" the start-finish line. Instead, the timing line for qualifying will be set at the exit of Turn 13. Connor Zilisch, driving for JR Motorsports, would score the pole for the race, with a lap of 1:25.054, and a speed of 96.503 mph (155.307 km/h). JRM became the first team in series history to sweep the first five positions in qualifying.

Four drivers would fail to qualify: Garrett Smithley, Thomas Annunziata, Austin J. Hill, and Andrew Patterson.

=== Qualifying results ===
| Pos. | # | Driver | Team | Make | Time | Speed |
|---|---|---|---|---|---|---|
| 1 | 88 | Connor Zilisch (P) (R) | JR Motorsports | Chevrolet | 1:25.054 | 96.503 |
| 2 | 7 | Justin Allgaier (P) | JR Motorsports | Chevrolet | 1:25.514 | 95.984 |
| 3 | 9 | Connor Mosack (i) | JR Motorsports | Chevrolet | 1:25.797 | 95.668 |
| 4 | 8 | Sammy Smith (P) | JR Motorsports | Chevrolet | 1:25.973 | 95.472 |
| 5 | 1 | Carson Kvapil (P) (R) | JR Motorsports | Chevrolet | 1:26.047 | 95.390 |
| 6 | 17 | Corey Day | Hendrick Motorsports | Chevrolet | 1:26.260 | 95.154 |
| 7 | 41 | Sam Mayer (P) | Haas Factory Team | Ford | 1:26.375 | 95.027 |
| 8 | 2 | Jesse Love (P) | Richard Childress Racing | Chevrolet | 1:26.390 | 95.011 |
| 9 | 24 | Kaz Grala (i) | Sam Hunt Racing | Toyota | 1:26.412 | 94.987 |
| 10 | 87 | Austin Green | Jordan Anderson Racing | Chevrolet | 1:26.472 | 94.921 |
| 11 | 19 | Aric Almirola (OP) | Joe Gibbs Racing | Toyota | 1:26.516 | 94.873 |
| 12 | 44 | Brennan Poole | Alpha Prime Racing | Chevrolet | 1:26.533 | 94.854 |
| 13 | 00 | Sheldon Creed (P) | Haas Factory Team | Ford | 1:26.565 | 94.819 |
| 14 | 48 | Nick Sanchez (P) (R) | Big Machine Racing | Chevrolet | 1:26.590 | 94.792 |
| 15 | 18 | William Sawalich (R) | Joe Gibbs Racing | Toyota | 1:26.608 | 94.772 |
| 16 | 21 | Austin Hill (P) | Richard Childress Racing | Chevrolet | 1:26.657 | 94.718 |
| 17 | 54 | Taylor Gray (P) (R) | Joe Gibbs Racing | Toyota | 1:26.659 | 94.716 |
| 18 | 16 | Christian Eckes (R) | Kaulig Racing | Chevrolet | 1:26.663 | 94.712 |
| 19 | 50 | Preston Pardus | Pardus Racing | Chevrolet | 1:26.735 | 94.633 |
| 20 | 99 | Matt DiBenedetto | Viking Motorsports | Chevrolet | 1:26.789 | 94.574 |
| 21 | 07 | Alex Labbé | SS-Green Light Racing | Chevrolet | 1:26.842 | 94.516 |
| 22 | 39 | Ryan Sieg | RSS Racing | Ford | 1:26.920 | 94.432 |
| 23 | 20 | Brandon Jones (P) | Joe Gibbs Racing | Toyota | 1:27.052 | 94.288 |
| 24 | 91 | Josh Bilicki | DGM Racing | Chevrolet | 1:27.058 | 94.282 |
| 25 | 53 | Sage Karam | Joey Gase Motorsports | Toyota | 1:27.084 | 94.254 |
| 26 | 4 | Parker Retzlaff | Alpha Prime Racing | Chevrolet | 1:27.105 | 94.231 |
| 27 | 11 | Daniel Hemric (i) | Kaulig Racing | Chevrolet | 1:27.113 | 94.222 |
| 28 | 25 | Harrison Burton (P) | AM Racing | Ford | 1:27.157 | 94.175 |
| 29 | 71 | Ryan Ellis | DGM Racing | Chevrolet | 1:27.323 | 93.996 |
| 30 | 27 | Jeb Burton | Jordan Anderson Racing | Chevrolet | 1:27.372 | 93.943 |
| 31 | 92 | Leland Honeyman | DGM Racing | Chevrolet | 1:27.506 | 93.799 |
| 32 | 45 | Josh Williams | Alpha Prime Racing | Chevrolet | 1:27.517 | 93.787 |
Qualified by owner's points
| 33 | 26 | Dean Thompson (R) | Sam Hunt Racing | Toyota | 1:27.562 | 93.739 |
| 34 | 42 | Anthony Alfredo | Young's Motorsports | Chevrolet | 1:27.645 | 93.651 |
| 35 | 31 | Blaine Perkins | Jordan Anderson Racing | Chevrolet | 1:27.663 | 93.631 |
| 36 | 51 | Jeremy Clements | Jeremy Clements Racing | Chevrolet | 1:28.143 | 93.121 |
| 37 | 28 | Kyle Sieg | RSS Racing | Ford | 1:28.513 | 92.732 |
| 38 | 10 | Daniel Dye (R) | Kaulig Racing | Chevrolet | 1:29.002 | 92.223 |
Failed to qualify
| 39 | 14 | Garrett Smithley | SS-Green Light Racing | Chevrolet | 1:27.994 | 93.279 |
| 40 | 70 | Thomas Annunziata | Cope Family Racing | Chevrolet | 1:28.238 | 93.021 |
| 41 | 35 | Austin J. Hill | Joey Gase Motorsports | Chevrolet | 1:28.574 | 92.668 |
| 42 | 32 | Andrew Patterson | Jordan Anderson Racing | Chevrolet | 1:29.584 | 91.624 |
Official qualifying results
Official starting lineup

== Race results ==
Stage 1 Laps: 20

| Pos. | # | Driver | Team | Make | Pts |
|---|---|---|---|---|---|
| 1 | 88 | Connor Zilisch (P) (R) | JR Motorsports | Chevrolet | 10 |
| 2 | 2 | Jesse Love (P) | Richard Childress Racing | Chevrolet | 9 |
| 3 | 7 | Justin Allgaier (P) | JR Motorsports | Chevrolet | 8 |
| 4 | 8 | Sammy Smith (P) | JR Motorsports | Chevrolet | 7 |
| 5 | 1 | Carson Kvapil (P) (R) | JR Motorsports | Chevrolet | 6 |
| 6 | 21 | Austin Hill (P) | Richard Childress Racing | Chevrolet | 5 |
| 7 | 48 | Nick Sanchez (P) (R) | Big Machine Racing | Chevrolet | 4 |
| 8 | 19 | Aric Almirola (OP) | Joe Gibbs Racing | Toyota | 3 |
| 9 | 00 | Sheldon Creed (P) | Haas Factory Team | Ford | 2 |
| 10 | 9 | Connor Mosack (i) | JR Motorsports | Chevrolet | 0 |

Stage 2 Laps: 20

| Pos. | # | Driver | Team | Make | Pts |
|---|---|---|---|---|---|
| 1 | 2 | Jesse Love (P) | Richard Childress Racing | Chevrolet | 10 |
| 2 | 8 | Sammy Smith (P) | JR Motorsports | Chevrolet | 9 |
| 3 | 21 | Austin Hill (P) | Richard Childress Racing | Chevrolet | 8 |
| 4 | 00 | Sheldon Creed (P) | Haas Factory Team | Ford | 7 |
| 5 | 1 | Carson Kvapil (P) (R) | JR Motorsports | Chevrolet | 6 |
| 6 | 41 | Sam Mayer (P) | Haas Factory Team | Ford | 5 |
| 7 | 07 | Alex Labbé | SS-Green Light Racing | Chevrolet | 4 |
| 8 | 91 | Josh Bilicki | DGM Racing | Chevrolet | 3 |
| 9 | 53 | Sage Karam | Joey Gase Motorsports | Toyota | 2 |
| 10 | 88 | Connor Zilisch (P) (R) | JR Motorsports | Chevrolet | 1 |

Stage 3 Laps: 28

| Fin | St | # | Driver | Team | Make | Laps | Led | Status | Pts |
|---|---|---|---|---|---|---|---|---|---|
| 1 | 1 | 88 | Connor Zilisch (P) (R) | JR Motorsports | Chevrolet | 68 | 61 | Running | 52 |
| 2 | 10 | 87 | Austin Green | Jordan Anderson Racing | Chevrolet | 68 | 0 | Running | 35 |
| 3 | 4 | 8 | Sammy Smith (P) | JR Motorsports | Chevrolet | 68 | 0 | Running | 50 |
| 4 | 9 | 24 | Kaz Grala (i) | Sam Hunt Racing | Toyota | 68 | 0 | Running | 0 |
| 5 | 3 | 9 | Connor Mosack (i) | JR Motorsports | Chevrolet | 68 | 1 | Running | 0 |
| 6 | 30 | 27 | Jeb Burton | Jordan Anderson Racing | Chevrolet | 68 | 0 | Running | 31 |
| 7 | 15 | 18 | William Sawalich (R) | Joe Gibbs Racing | Toyota | 68 | 0 | Running | 30 |
| 8 | 2 | 7 | Justin Allgaier (P) | JR Motorsports | Chevrolet | 68 | 0 | Running | 37 |
| 9 | 14 | 48 | Nick Sanchez (P) (R) | Big Machine Racing | Chevrolet | 68 | 1 | Running | 32 |
| 10 | 18 | 16 | Christian Eckes (R) | Kaulig Racing | Chevrolet | 68 | 0 | Running | 27 |
| 11 | 13 | 00 | Sheldon Creed (P) | Haas Factory Team | Ford | 68 | 0 | Running | 35 |
| 12 | 8 | 2 | Jesse Love (P) | Richard Childress Racing | Chevrolet | 68 | 4 | Running | 44 |
| 13 | 17 | 54 | Taylor Gray (P) | Joe Gibbs Racing | Toyota | 68 | 0 | Running | 24 |
| 14 | 11 | 19 | Aric Almirola (OP) | Joe Gibbs Racing | Toyota | 68 | 0 | Running | 26 |
| 15 | 5 | 1 | Carson Kvapil (P) (R) | JR Motorsports | Chevrolet | 68 | 0 | Running | 34 |
| 16 | 26 | 4 | Parker Retzlaff | Alpha Prime Racing | Chevrolet | 68 | 0 | Running | 21 |
| 17 | 27 | 11 | Daniel Hemric (i) | Kaulig Racing | Chevrolet | 68 | 0 | Running | 0 |
| 18 | 23 | 20 | Brandon Jones (P) | Joe Gibbs Racing | Toyota | 68 | 0 | Running | 19 |
| 19 | 7 | 41 | Sam Mayer (P) | Haas Factory Team | Ford | 68 | 0 | Running | 23 |
| 20 | 22 | 39 | Ryan Sieg | RSS Racing | Ford | 68 | 0 | Running | 17 |
| 21 | 24 | 91 | Josh Bilicki | DGM Racing | Chevrolet | 68 | 0 | Running | 19 |
| 22 | 6 | 17 | Corey Day | Hendrick Motorsports | Chevrolet | 68 | 0 | Running | 15 |
| 23 | 34 | 42 | Anthony Alfredo | Young's Motorsports | Chevrolet | 68 | 0 | Running | 14 |
| 24 | 29 | 71 | Ryan Ellis | DGM Racing | Chevrolet | 68 | 0 | Running | 13 |
| 25 | 25 | 53 | Sage Karam | Joey Gase Motorsports | Toyota | 68 | 0 | Running | 14 |
| 26 | 31 | 92 | Leland Honeyman | DGM Racing | Chevrolet | 68 | 0 | Running | 11 |
| 27 | 36 | 51 | Jeremy Clements | Jeremy Clements Racing | Chevrolet | 68 | 0 | Running | 10 |
| 28 | 16 | 21 | Austin Hill (P) | Richard Childress Racing | Chevrolet | 68 | 1 | Running | 22 |
| 29 | 35 | 31 | Blaine Perkins | Jordan Anderson Racing | Chevrolet | 68 | 0 | Running | 8 |
| 30 | 21 | 07 | Alex Labbé | SS-Green Light Racing | Chevrolet | 67 | 0 | Running | 11 |
| 31 | 12 | 44 | Brennan Poole | Alpha Prime Racing | Chevrolet | 67 | 0 | Running | 6 |
| 32 | 20 | 99 | Matt DiBenedetto | Viking Motorsports | Chevrolet | 67 | 0 | Running | 5 |
| 33 | 37 | 28 | Kyle Sieg | RSS Racing | Ford | 67 | 0 | Running | 4 |
| 34 | 28 | 25 | Harrison Burton (P) | AM Racing | Ford | 64 | 0 | Running | 3 |
| 35 | 33 | 26 | Dean Thompson (R) | Sam Hunt Racing | Toyota | 62 | 0 | Running | 2 |
| 36 | 38 | 10 | Daniel Dye (R) | Kaulig Racing | Chevrolet | 44 | 0 | Transmission | 1 |
| 37 | 32 | 45 | Josh Williams | Alpha Prime Racing | Chevrolet | 20 | 0 | Fuel Pump | 1 |
| 38 | 19 | 50 | Preston Pardus | Pardus Racing | Chevrolet | 7 | 0 | Transmission | 1 |
Official race results

== Standings after the race ==
Drivers' Championship standings

| | Pos | Driver | Points |
|---|---|---|---|
| | 1 | Connor Zilisch | 3,071 |
| | 2 | Justin Allgaier | 3,038 (–33) |
| 1 | 3 | Brandon Jones | 3,018 (–53) |
| 1 | 4 | Sam Mayer | 3,016 (–55) |
| 3 | 5 | Jesse Love | 3,014 (–57) |
| 6 | 6 | Sammy Smith | 3,009 (–62) |
| | 7 | Carson Kvapil | 3,005 (–66) |
| 2 | 8 | Sheldon Creed | 3,003 (–68) |
| 4 | 9 | Taylor Gray | 2,100 (–971) |
| 1 | 10 | Nick Sanchez | 2,092 (–979) |
| 1 | 11 | Austin Hill | 2,080 (–991) |
| 1 | 12 | Harrison Burton | 2,060 (–1,011) |
Official driver's standings

Manufacturers' Championship standings

| Pos | Manufacturer | Points |
|---|---|---|
| 1 | Chevrolet | 1,128 |
| 2 | Toyota | 954 (–174) |
| 3 | Ford | 906 (–222) |

- Note: Only the first 12 positions are included for the driver standings.

| Previous race: 2025 Kansas Lottery 300 | NASCAR Xfinity Series; 2025 season | Next race: 2025 Focused Health 302 |
