= 2025 The LiUNA! =

5th race of the 2025 NASCAR Xfinity Series

Race details
- Race 5 of 33 of the 2025 NASCAR Xfinity Series
- Date: March 15, 2025
- Official name: 29th Annual The LiUNA!
- Location: Las Vegas Motor Speedway in North Las Vegas, Nevada
- Course: Permanent racing facility
- Course length: 1.5 miles (2.4 km)
- Distance: 200 laps, 300 mi (482 km)
- Scheduled distance: 200 laps, 300 mi (482 km)
- Average speed: 140.078 mph (225.434 km/h)

Pole position
Driver	Sammy Smith	JR Motorsports
- Time: 29.435

Most laps led
Driver	Justin Allgaier	JR Motorsports
- Laps: 102

Winner
No. 7	Justin Allgaier	JR Motorsports

Television in the United States
- Network: The CW
- Announcers: Adam Alexander, Jamie McMurray, and Kyle Busch

Radio in the United States
- Radio: PRN

The 2025 The LiUNA! was the 5th stock car race of the 2025 NASCAR Xfinity Series, and the 29th iteration of the event. The race was held on March 15, 2025, at Las Vegas Motor Speedway in North Las Vegas, Nevada, a 1.5 miles (2.4 km) permanent asphalt quad-oval shaped intermediate speedway. The race took the scheduled 200 laps to complete.

Justin Allgaier, driving for JR Motorsports, would make a late-race pass for the lead on Aric Almirola with under ten laps to go, and took the victory in dominating fashion, winning the first stage and leading a race-high 102 laps to earn his 26th career NASCAR Xfinity Series win, and his first of the season. To fill out the podium, Jesse Love, driving for Richard Childress Racing, would finish in 3rd, respectively.

== Report ==
=== Background ===
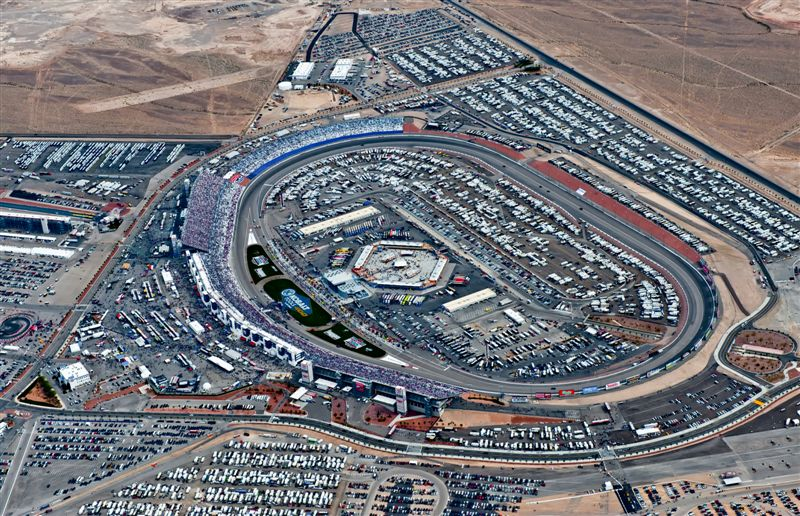
Las Vegas Motor Speedway, the track where the race was held.

Las Vegas Motor Speedway, located in Clark County, Nevada outside the Las Vegas city limits and about 15 miles northeast of the Las Vegas Strip, is a 1,200-acre (490 ha) complex of multiple tracks for motorsports racing. The complex is owned by Speedway Motorsports, Inc., which is headquartered in Charlotte, North Carolina.

==== Entry list ====
- (R) denotes rookie driver.

#	Driver	Team	Make
00	Sheldon Creed	Haas Factory Team	Ford
1	Carson Kvapil (R)	JR Motorsports	Chevrolet
2	Jesse Love	Richard Childress Racing	Chevrolet
4	Parker Retzlaff	Alpha Prime Racing	Chevrolet
5	Kris Wright	Our Motorsports	Chevrolet
07	Patrick Emerling	SS-Green Light Racing	Chevrolet
7	Justin Allgaier	JR Motorsports	Chevrolet
8	Sammy Smith	JR Motorsports	Chevrolet
10	Daniel Dye (R)	Kaulig Racing	Chevrolet
11	Josh Williams	Kaulig Racing	Chevrolet
14	Garrett Smithley	SS-Green Light Racing	Chevrolet
16	Christian Eckes (R)	Kaulig Racing	Chevrolet
18	William Sawalich (R)	Joe Gibbs Racing	Toyota
19	Aric Almirola	Joe Gibbs Racing	Toyota
20	Brandon Jones	Joe Gibbs Racing	Toyota
21	Austin Hill	Richard Childress Racing	Chevrolet
25	Harrison Burton	AM Racing	Ford
26	Dean Thompson (R)	Sam Hunt Racing	Toyota
27	Jeb Burton	Jordan Anderson Racing	Chevrolet
28	Kyle Sieg	RSS Racing	Ford
31	Blaine Perkins	Jordan Anderson Racing	Chevrolet
32	Austin Green	Jordan Anderson Racing	Chevrolet
35	Greg Van Alst	Joey Gase Motorsports	Chevrolet
39	Ryan Sieg	RSS Racing	Ford
41	Sam Mayer	Haas Factory Team	Ford
42	Anthony Alfredo	Young's Motorsports	Chevrolet
44	Brennan Poole	Alpha Prime Racing	Chevrolet
45	Mason Massey	Alpha Prime Racing	Chevrolet
48	Nick Sanchez (R)	Big Machine Racing	Chevrolet
51	Jeremy Clements	Jeremy Clements Racing	Chevrolet
53	Joey Gase	Joey Gase Motorsports	Chevrolet
54	Taylor Gray (R)	Joe Gibbs Racing	Toyota
70	Leland Honeyman	Cope Family Racing	Chevrolet
71	Ryan Ellis	DGM Racing	Chevrolet
74	Dawson Cram	Mike Harmon Racing	Chevrolet
88	Connor Zilisch (R)	JR Motorsports	Chevrolet
91	Josh Bilicki	DGM Racing	Chevrolet
99	Matt DiBenedetto	Viking Motorsports	Chevrolet
Official entry list

== Practice ==
For practice, drivers were separated into two different groups, A and B. Both sessions were 25 minutes long, and was held on Friday, March 14, at 3:35 PM PST. Connor Zilisch, driving for JR Motorsports, would set the fastest time between both sessions, with a lap of 30.267, and a speed of 178.412 mph (287.126 km/h).

Pos.	#	Driver	Team	Make	Time	Speed
1	88	Connor Zilisch (R)	JR Motorsports	Chevrolet	30.267	178.412
2	00	Sheldon Creed	Haas Factory Team	Ford	30.381	177.743
3	8	Sammy Smith	JR Motorsports	Chevrolet	30.420	177.515
Full practice results

== Qualifying ==
Qualifying was held on Friday, March 14, at 4:10 PM PST. Since Las Vegas Motor Speedway is an intermediate speedway, the qualifying procedure used is a single-car, single-lap system with one round. Drivers will be on track by themselves and will have one lap to post a qualifying time, and whoever sets the fastest time will win the pole.

Sammy Smith, driving for JR Motorsports, would score the pole for the race, with a lap of 29.435, and a speed of 183.455 mph (295.242 km/h).

No drivers would fail to qualify.

=== Qualifying results ===
Pos.	#	Driver	Team	Make	Time	Speed
1	8	Sammy Smith	JR Motorsports	Chevrolet	29.435	183.455
2	1	Carson Kvapil (R)	JR Motorsports	Chevrolet	29.502	183.038
3	88	Connor Zilisch (R)	JR Motorsports	Chevrolet	29.564	182.655
4	54	Taylor Gray (R)	Joe Gibbs Racing	Toyota	29.592	182.482
5	41	Sam Mayer	Haas Factory Team	Ford	29.634	182.223
6	7	Justin Allgaier	JR Motorsports	Chevrolet	29.642	182.174
7	2	Jesse Love	Richard Childress Racing	Chevrolet	29.645	182.156
8	18	William Sawalich (R)	Joe Gibbs Racing	Toyota	29.668	182.014
9	48	Nick Sanchez (R)	Big Machine Racing	Chevrolet	29.674	181.977
10	27	Jeb Burton	Jordan Anderson Racing	Chevrolet	29.688	181.892
11	19	Aric Almirola	Joe Gibbs Racing	Toyota	29.710	181.757
12	4	Parker Retzlaff	Alpha Prime Racing	Chevrolet	29.724	181.671
13	51	Jeremy Clements	Jeremy Clements Racing	Chevrolet	29.807	181.165
14	21	Austin Hill	Richard Childress Racing	Chevrolet	29.822	181.074
15	20	Brandon Jones	Joe Gibbs Racing	Toyota	29.833	181.008
16	10	Daniel Dye (R)	Kaulig Racing	Chevrolet	30.063	179.623
17	16	Christian Eckes (R)	Kaulig Racing	Chevrolet	30.075	179.551
18	25	Harrison Burton	AM Racing	Ford	30.094	179.438
19	99	Matt DiBenedetto	Viking Motorsports	Chevrolet	30.133	179.206
20	39	Ryan Sieg	RSS Racing	Ford	30.201	178.802
21	28	Kyle Sieg	RSS Racing	Ford	30.263	178.436
22	42	Anthony Alfredo	Young's Motorsports	Chevrolet	30.270	178.394
23	00	Sheldon Creed	Haas Factory Team	Ford	30.310	178.159
24	11	Josh Williams	Kaulig Racing	Chevrolet	30.364	177.842
25	07	Patrick Emerling	SS-Green Light Racing	Chevrolet	30.412	177.561
26	5	Kris Wright	Our Motorsports	Chevrolet	30.436	177.421
27	31	Blaine Perkins	Jordan Anderson Racing	Chevrolet	30.521	176.927
28	26	Dean Thompson (R)	Sam Hunt Racing	Toyota	30.577	176.603
29	70	Leland Honeyman	Cope Family Racing	Chevrolet	30.585	176.557
30	44	Brennan Poole	Alpha Prime Racing	Chevrolet	30.699	175.901
31	45	Mason Massey	Alpha Prime Racing	Chevrolet	30.916	174.667
32	74	Dawson Cram	Mike Harmon Racing	Chevrolet	31.119	173.527
Qualified by owner's points
33	14	Garrett Smithley	SS-Green Light Racing	Chevrolet	31.183	173.171
34	91	Josh Bilicki	DGM Racing	Chevrolet	31.198	173.088
35	71	Ryan Ellis	DGM Racing	Chevrolet	31.288	172.590
36	32	Austin Green	Jordan Anderson Racing	Chevrolet	31.367	172.155
37	53	Joey Gase	Joey Gase Motorsports	Chevrolet	31.744	170.111
38	35	Greg Van Alst	Joey Gase Motorsports	Chevrolet	32.112	168.161
Official qualifying results
Official starting lineup

== Race results ==
Stage 1 Laps: 45

Pos.	#	Driver	Team	Make	Pts
1	7	Justin Allgaier	JR Motorsports	Chevrolet	10
2	19	Aric Almirola	Joe Gibbs Racing	Toyota	9
3	1	Carson Kvapil (R)	JR Motorsports	Chevrolet	8
4	88	Connor Zilisch (R)	JR Motorsports	Chevrolet	7
5	54	Taylor Gray (R)	Joe Gibbs Racing	Toyota	6
6	8	Sammy Smith	JR Motorsports	Chevrolet	5
7	21	Austin Hill	Richard Childress Racing	Chevrolet	4
8	2	Jesse Love	Richard Childress Racing	Chevrolet	3
9	41	Sam Mayer	Haas Factory Team	Ford	2
10	39	Ryan Sieg	RSS Racing	Ford	1

Stage 2 Laps: 45

Pos.	#	Driver	Team	Make	Pts
1	19	Aric Almirola	Joe Gibbs Racing	Toyota	10
2	7	Justin Allgaier	JR Motorsports	Chevrolet	9
3	88	Connor Zilisch (R)	JR Motorsports	Chevrolet	8
4	8	Sammy Smith	JR Motorsports	Chevrolet	7
5	41	Sam Mayer	Haas Factory Team	Ford	6
6	1	Carson Kvapil (R)	JR Motorsports	Chevrolet	5
7	54	Taylor Gray (R)	Joe Gibbs Racing	Toyota	4
8	20	Brandon Jones	Joe Gibbs Racing	Toyota	3
9	00	Sheldon Creed	Haas Factory Team	Ford	2
10	2	Jesse Love	Richard Childress Racing	Chevrolet	1

Stage 3 Laps: 110

Fin	St	#	Driver	Team	Make	Laps	Led	Status	Pts
1	6	7	Justin Allgaier	JR Motorsports	Chevrolet	200	102	Running	59
2	11	19	Aric Almirola	Joe Gibbs Racing	Toyota	200	51	Running	54
3	7	2	Jesse Love	Richard Childress Racing	Chevrolet	200	0	Running	38
4	14	21	Austin Hill	Richard Childress Racing	Chevrolet	200	0	Running	37
5	5	41	Sam Mayer	Haas Factory Team	Ford	200	0	Running	40
6	15	20	Brandon Jones	Joe Gibbs Racing	Toyota	200	0	Running	34
7	20	39	Ryan Sieg	RSS Racing	Ford	200	0	Running	31
8	18	25	Harrison Burton	AM Racing	Ford	200	0	Running	29
9	3	88	Connor Zilisch (R)	JR Motorsports	Chevrolet	200	28	Running	44
10	23	00	Sheldon Creed	Haas Factory Team	Ford	199	0	Running	29
11	21	28	Kyle Sieg	RSS Racing	Ford	199	6	Running	26
12	16	10	Daniel Dye (R)	Kaulig Racing	Chevrolet	199	0	Running	25
13	17	16	Christian Eckes (R)	Kaulig Racing	Chevrolet	199	0	Running	24
14	1	8	Sammy Smith	JR Motorsports	Chevrolet	199	13	Running	35
15	28	26	Dean Thompson (R)	Sam Hunt Racing	Toyota	199	0	Running	22
16	19	99	Matt DiBenedetto	Viking Motorsports	Chevrolet	199	0	Running	21
17	2	1	Carson Kvapil (R)	JR Motorsports	Chevrolet	199	0	Running	33
18	22	42	Anthony Alfredo	Young's Motorsports	Chevrolet	199	0	Running	19
19	4	54	Taylor Gray (R)	Joe Gibbs Racing	Toyota	198	0	Running	28
20	9	48	Nick Sanchez (R)	Big Machine Racing	Chevrolet	198	0	Running	17
21	12	4	Parker Retzlaff	Alpha Prime Racing	Chevrolet	198	0	Running	16
22	30	44	Brennan Poole	Alpha Prime Racing	Chevrolet	198	0	Running	15
23	10	27	Jeb Burton	Jordan Anderson Racing	Chevrolet	198	0	Running	14
24	13	51	Jeremy Clements	Jeremy Clements Racing	Chevrolet	197	0	Running	13
25	26	5	Kris Wright	Our Motorsports	Chevrolet	196	0	Running	12
26	27	31	Blaine Perkins	Jordan Anderson Racing	Chevrolet	195	0	Running	11
27	33	14	Garrett Smithley	SS-Green Light Racing	Chevrolet	194	0	Running	10
28	25	07	Patrick Emerling	SS-Green Light Racing	Chevrolet	194	0	Running	9
29	24	11	Josh Williams (Note: Josh Williams was recovering from illness during the race, and was relieved by Ty Dillon after the first stage. Since Williams started the race, he is officially credited with 29th place.)	Kaulig Racing	Chevrolet	194	0	Running	8
30	29	70	Leland Honeyman	Cope Family Racing	Chevrolet	194	0	Running	7
31	34	91	Josh Bilicki	DGM Racing	Chevrolet	193	0	Running	6
32	32	74	Dawson Cram	Mike Harmon Racing	Chevrolet	192	0	Running	5
33	37	53	Joey Gase	Joey Gase Motorsports	Chevrolet	191	0	Running	4
34	35	71	Ryan Ellis	DGM Racing	Chevrolet	181	0	Running	3
35	38	35	Greg Van Alst	Joey Gase Motorsports	Chevrolet	179	0	Running	2
36	36	32	Austin Green	Jordan Anderson Racing	Chevrolet	139	0	Alternator	1
37	31	45	Mason Massey	Alpha Prime Racing	Chevrolet	113	0	Suspension	1
38	8	18	William Sawalich (R)	Joe Gibbs Racing	Toyota	0	0	Accident	1
Official race results

== Standings after the race ==
Drivers' Championship standings

	Pos	Driver	Points
1	1	Justin Allgaier	200
1	2	Jesse Love	181 (–19)
	3	Sam Mayer	170 (–30)
	4	Austin Hill	160 (–40)
	5	Sammy Smith	156 (–44)
5	6	Aric Almirola	151 (–49)
1	7	Sheldon Creed	144 (–56)
1	8	Taylor Gray	137 (–63)
5	9	Connor Zilisch	133 (–67)
3	10	Ryan Sieg	133 (–67)
2	11	Christian Eckes	127 (–73)
4	12	Jeb Burton	121 (–79)
Official driver's standings

Manufacturers' Championship standings

Pos	Manufacturer	Points
1	Chevrolet	195
2	Toyota	171 (–24)
3	Ford	161 (–34)

- Note: Only the first 12 positions are included for the driver standings.

Previous race: 2025 GOVX 200	NASCAR Xfinity Series; 2025 season	Next race: 2025 Hard Rock Bet 300
