= JR Motorsports =

American NASCAR team

- Owner(s): Dale Earnhardt Jr. Kelley Earnhardt Miller; Rick Hendrick; L. W. Miller
- Base: Mooresville, North Carolina
- Series: NASCAR Cup Series; NASCAR O'Reilly Auto Parts Series; NASCAR Advance Auto Parts Weekly Series; CARS Late Model Stock Tour eNASCAR Coca-Cola iRacing Series
- Race drivers: Cup Series: 40. Justin Allgaier (part-time); O'Reilly Auto Parts Series: 1. Sam Mayer; 7. Justin Allgaier; 8. Carson Kvapil; 9. Carson Hocevar, Connor Zilisch, Shane Van Gisbergen, Ross Chastain, Tristan McKee, Jake Finch; 88. Rajah Caruth; Late Model Stock Cars: 8. Dale Earnhardt Jr., Lee Pulliam, Chase Elliott, Connor Zilisch, Treyten Lapcevich; 73. Wyatt Miller; 88. Caden Kvapil
- Manufacturer: Chevrolet
- Opened: 2005
- Website: jrmracing.com

Career
- Debut: Cup Series: 2025 Daytona 500 (Daytona); O'Reilly Auto Parts Series: 2005 Ford 300 (Homestead); Camping World Truck Series: 2015 Kroger 250 (Martinsville); ARCA Racing Series: 2008 Lucas Oil 200 (Daytona)
- Latest race: Cup Series: 2026 Daytona 500 (Daytona); O'Reilly Auto Parts Series: 2026 O'Reilly Auto Parts 300 (Homestead); Camping World Truck Series: 2016 Ford EcoBoost 200 (Homestead); ARCA Racing Series: 2015 ModSpace 125 (Pocono)
- Races competed: Total: 751; Cup Series: 2 O'Reilly Auto Parts Series: 705; Camping World Truck Series: 38; ARCA Racing Series: 6
- Drivers' Championships: Total: 5 Cup Series: 0 O'Reilly Auto Parts Series: 5; 2014, 2017, 2018, 2024, 2026; Camping World Truck Series: 0 ARCA Racing Series: 0
- Race victories: Total: 125; Cup Series: 0 O'Reilly Auto Parts Series: 122; Camping World Truck Series: 2 ARCA Racing Series: 1
- Pole positions: Total: 62; Cup Series: 0 O'Reilly Auto Parts Series: 57; Camping World Truck Series: 4 ARCA Racing Series: 1

JR Motorsports (pronounced "Junior Motorsports") is an American professional stock car racing team based in Mooresville, North Carolina, co-owned by Dale Earnhardt Jr., Kelley Earnhardt Miller, L. W. Miller, and Rick Hendrick. It currently competes in the NASCAR Cup Series, NASCAR O'Reilly Auto Parts Series, eNASCAR Coca-Cola iRacing Series, CARS Late Model Stock Tour, and occasionally in the NASCAR Local Racing Series Powered by O'Reilly Auto Parts.

The team fields the No. 40 Chevrolet Camaro ZL1 part-time at the NASCAR Cup Series for Justin Allgaier. The team also fields five full-time entries in the O'Reilly Auto Parts Series: the No. 1 Chevrolet Camaro SS full-time for Sam Mayer, the No. 7 full-time for Allgaier, the No. 8 full-time for Carson Kvapil, the No. 9 full-time for multiple drivers, and the No. 88 full-time for Rajah Caruth. The team fields the No. 88 Chevrolet full-time in the CARS Late Model Stock Tour for Caden Kvapil.

== History ==
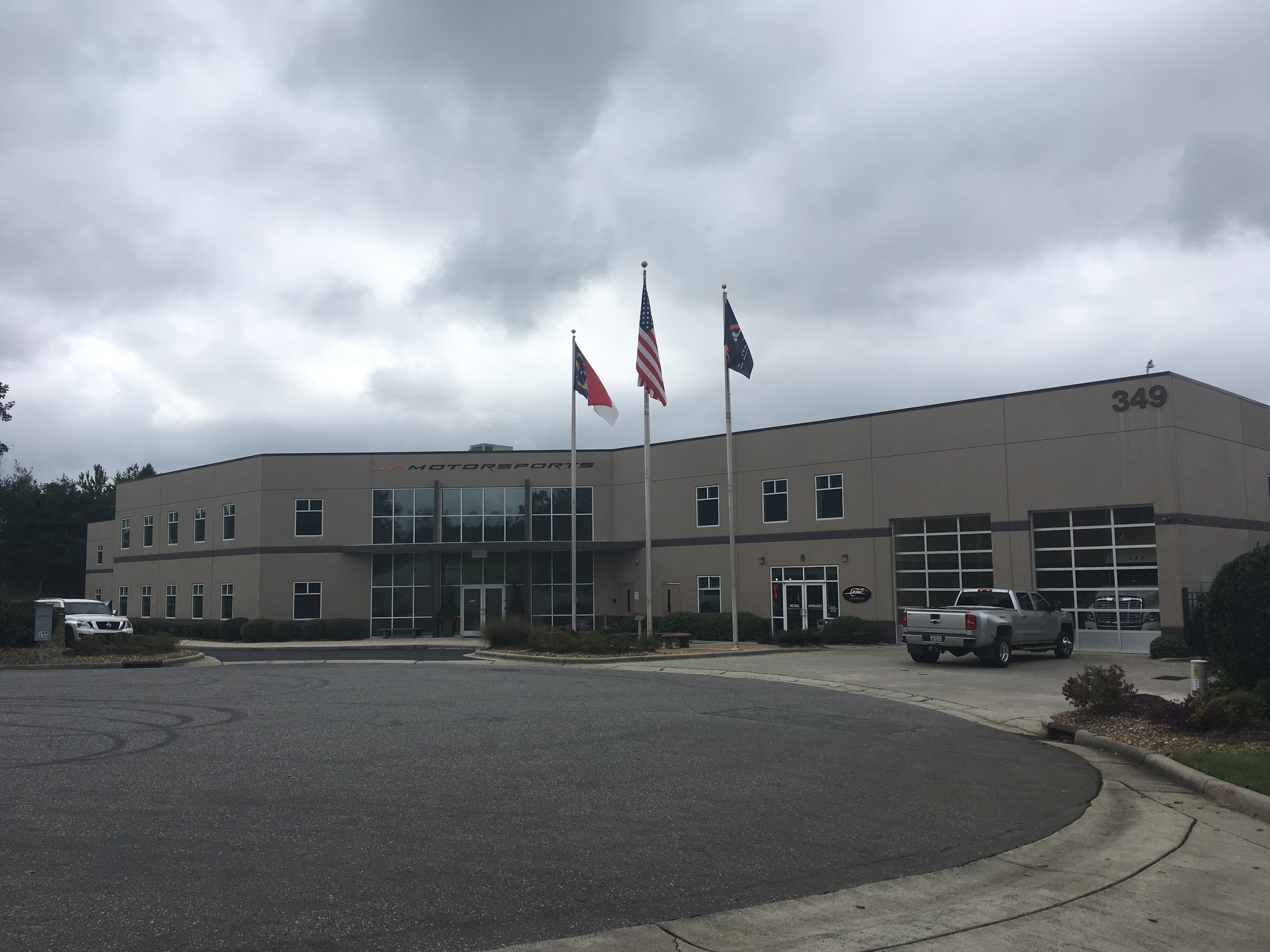
The JR Motorsports race shop in Mooresville, North Carolina

JR Motorsports began in a shed on the property of Dale Earnhardt, Inc. in 1998 with just one employee, as the marketing division of Dale Earnhardt Jr.'s race team. It wasn't until 2002 that Earnhardt Jr. turned the business into a race team when T. J. Majors drove in the street stock division at Concord Speedway in North Carolina. Upon Earnhardt Jr.'s signing with Hendrick Motorsports, the Hendrick and JR Motorsports Nationwide Series teams were merged.

The first win for the team came at Motor Mile Speedway in Radford, Virginia, in 2004. (At the time, Earnhardt Jr. was co-owner of another racing venture, Chance 2 Motorsports.) JR Motorsports in its current form, competing in the NASCAR O'Reilly Auto Parts Series, started in 2006 when sponsorship from the United States Navy funded the team. The team originally wanted to open in 2007, but the Navy sponsorship accelerated operations.

Today, the team operates out of a 66,000-square-foot (6,100 m^{2}) race shop near Mooresville, North Carolina.

In early 2019, it was announced that JR Motorsports had formed a driver development program with GMS Racing, Drivers Edge Development, to train young drivers. Drivers in the program would race in JR Motorsports' Late Model and NASCAR O'Reilly Auto Parts Series teams, as well as GMS Racing's NASCAR K&N Pro Series, ARCA Menards Series, and NASCAR Craftsman Truck Series teams. The inaugural class of drivers, which was announced on January 24, 2019, included Noah Gragson, John Hunter Nemechek, Zane Smith, Sheldon Creed, Sam Mayer, and Adam Lemke. Carson Hocevar also joined the program later in 2019. The 2023 season was the last for the program when GMS Racing closed down. The class of drivers in the DED program that year included GMS Truck Series drivers Rajah Caruth and Daniel Dye, as well as JRM late model driver Carson Kvapil.

On April 11, 2021, Earnhardt Jr. hinted that JR Motorsports may move up to the Cup Series, given the proposed savings associated with the debut of the Next Gen car in 2022. The challenges for the team are acquiring a charter and securing sponsorship for a Cup program.

On August 24, 2022, Director of Competition Ryan Pemberton parted ways with JR Motorsports after working with the team since 2012. On September 1, Mike Bumgarner was announced as Pemberton's replacement.

== Cup Series ==
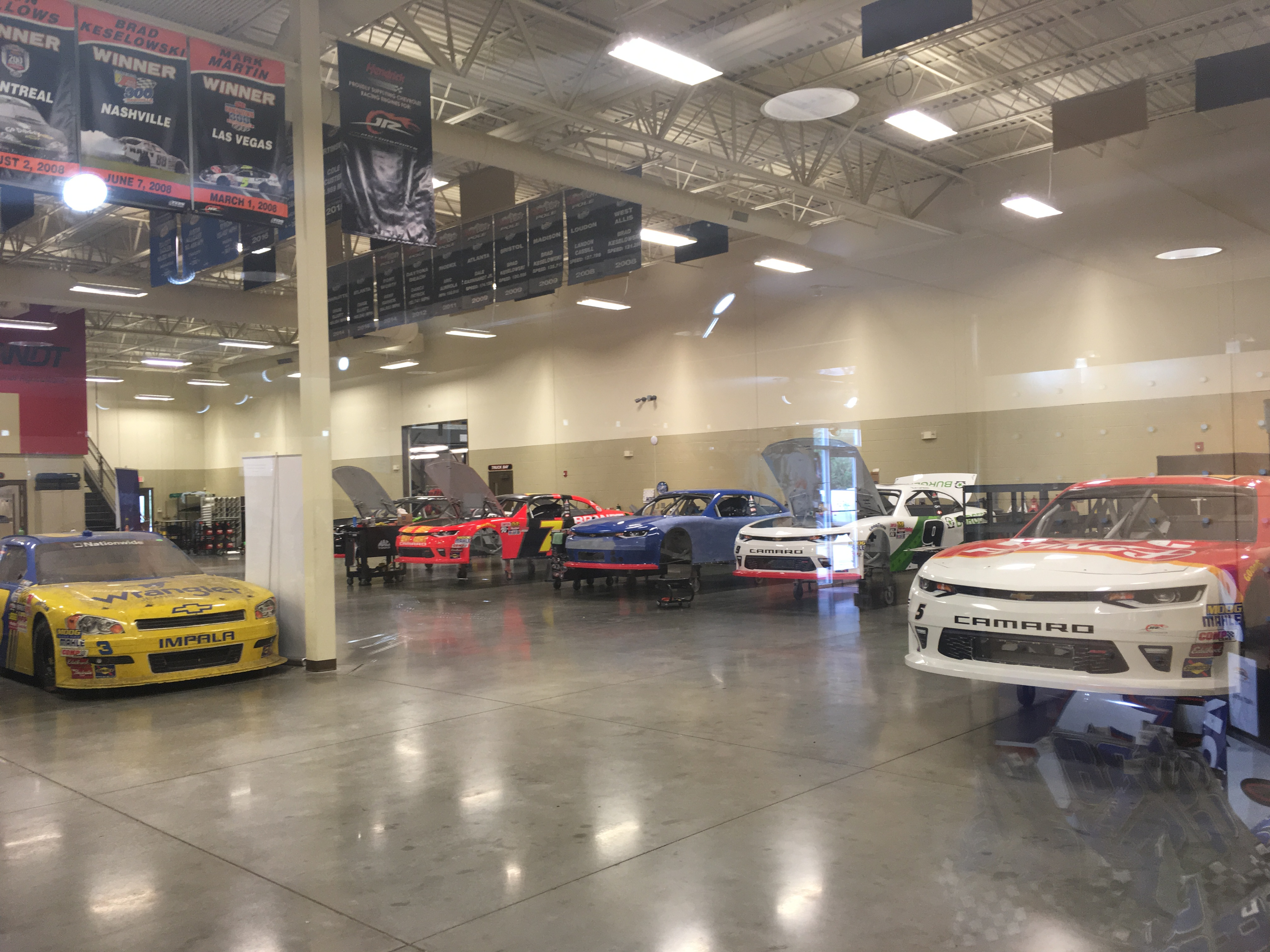
The JR Motorsports race shop floor

During a press conference at Lowe's Motor Speedway on May 16, 2008, Earnhardt stated that once the Nationwide (now O'Reilly Auto Parts) Series started using the Car of Tomorrow chassis, which debuted in July 2010 at the Daytona International Speedway, his Nationwide teams might leave the series due to the costs of switching cars. When asked if he would move JR Motorsports to the Sprint Cup Series, Earnhardt said that because the Xfinity Series and Sprint Cup Series had almost the same expensive costs, he might move the team to the Sprint Cup Series as early as 2009 "if the right opportunity comes along with the right sponsorship and driver...". However, JR Motorsports did not end up moving their team to the Sprint Cup and has remained in the Xfinity Series (and at the time, Truck Series), partially due to NASCAR's Cup Series limit of four cars per team owner. Because Rick Hendrick has an ownership stake in JR Motorsports and already fields the maximum of four cars with Hendrick Motorsports, JR Motorsports cannot field an entry in the Cup Series without Hendrick releasing his interest in the team. However, on April 11, 2021, Earnhardt Jr. hinted that JR Motorsports may move up to the Cup Series, given the proposed savings associated with the debut of the Next-Gen car in 2022. The challenges for the team are acquiring a charter, not continuing their professional relationship with Hendrick (as a JRM Cup team with Hendrick's involvement would max out the four-car limit of Hendrick Motorsports), and securing sponsorship for a Cup program.

=== Car No. 40 history ===
On January 15, 2025, it was announced that JR Motorsports, in collaboration with Chris Stapleton, intended to compete in the 2025 Daytona 500 with the No. 40 car, driven by Justin Allgaier. No. 40 was selected for the car to reflect the labeling of Stapleton's signature Traveller Whiskey, the primary sponsor of the car, as "Blend No. 40" on its bottles. This was Allgaier's first Cup Series start since the 2024 Coca-Cola 600, where he filled in for Kyle Larson. Larson was originally scheduled to pilot the No. 5 car but missed the race due to his participation in the 2024 Indianapolis 500 on a day when weather issues delayed the Indianapolis 500 several hours and cut the Coca-Cola 600 short before Larson could get in the car.

Despite the most Daytona 500 entries in a decade since the introduction of the charter system, Allgaier would finish as the top open car in his duel and make the field for the race. Allgaier piloted the entry to a ninth-place finish after starting nineteenth.

On November 14, 2025, it was announced that JR Motorsports will enter the 2026 Daytona 500 with Allgaier and Traveller Whiskey in the No. 40 car for the second year in a row.

==== Car No. 40 results ====
Year	Driver	No.	Make	1	2	3	4	5	6	7	8	9	10	11	12	13	14	15	16	17	18	19	20	21	22	23	24	25	26	27	28	29	30	31	32	33	34	35	36	Owners	Pts
2025	Justin Allgaier	40	Chevy	DAY; 9	ATL	COA	PHO	LVS	HOM	MAR	DAR	BRI	TAL	TEX	KAN	CLT	NSH	MCH	MXC	POC	ATL	CSC	SON	DOV	IND	IOW	GLN	RCH	DAY	DAR	GTW	BRI	NHA	KAN	ROV	LVS	TAL	MAR	PHO	45th	30
2026	Justin Allgaier	40	Chevy	DAY; 38	ATL	COA	PHO	LVS	DAR	MAR	BRI	KAN	TAL	TEX	GLN	CLT	NSH	MCH	POC	COR	SON	CHI	ATL	NWS	IND	IOW	RCH	NHA	DAY	DAR	GTW	BRI	KAN	LVS	CLT	PHO	TAL	MAR	HOM	45th	1

== O'Reilly Auto Parts Series ==
=== Car No. 1 history ===
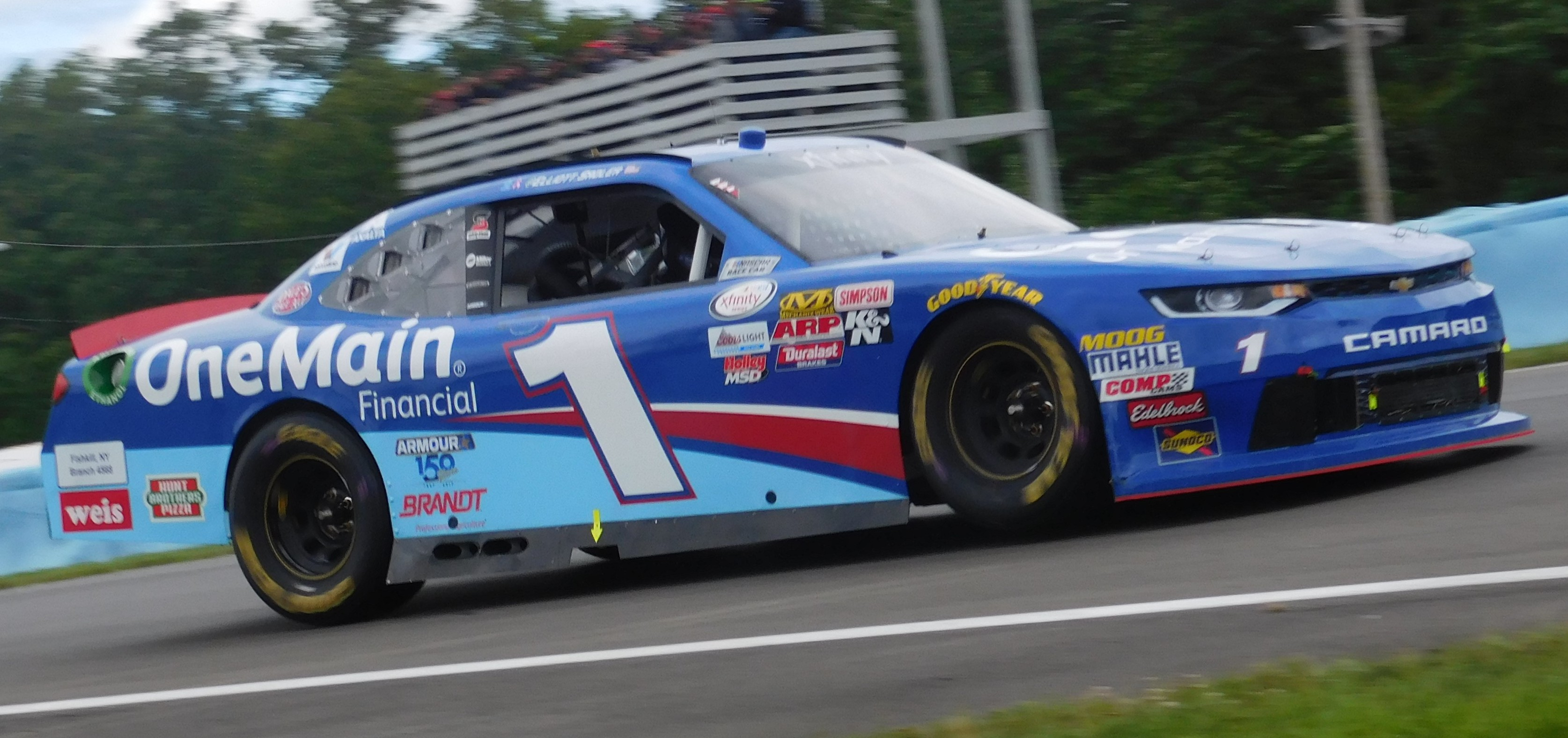
Elliott Sadler at Watkins Glen International in 2017

Elliott Sadler (2016–2018)

It was announced in late 2015 that Elliott Sadler would drive the new No. 1 OneMain Financial Chevy, replacing Chase Elliott as he moved up to take over the No. 24 replacing Jeff Gordon. Sadler started the season with a fourth-place finish in the season opener at Daytona. He would win three races in 2016 and ended up finishing second in the overall standings after a controversial restart with less than ten laps remaining at Homestead that cost Sadler and his teammate, Justin Allgaier, a shot to win the title. In 2017, Sadler didn't win a race but ended up finishing second in points behind only teammate William Byron.

Michael Annett (2019–2021)

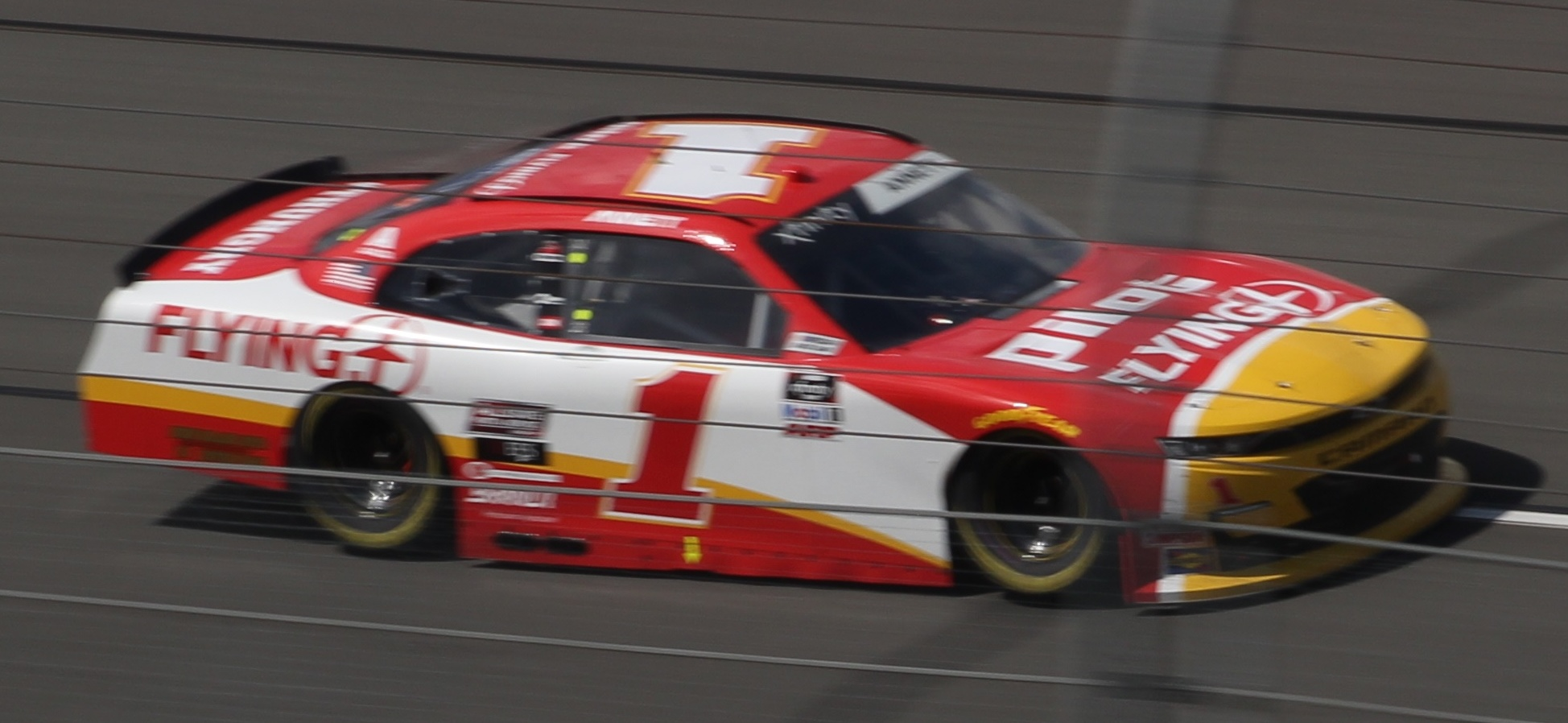
Michael Annett at Pocono Raceway in 2020

On September 25, 2018, Noah Gragson was announced as the new driver of the No. 1 after Sadler announced his retirement earlier that year; However, on January 25, 2019, it was announced that Michael Annett would drive the No. 1 car with the points from the 5 car going over to the 1 car while Gragson would drive the No. 9 car. Annett scored his first career victory at Daytona International Speedway in the NASCAR Racing Experience 300. Annett returned to JRM in 2020 and qualified for the playoffs. He was eliminated after the first round. In July 2021, Annett missed the races at Atlanta and New Hampshire due to a stress fracture in his right femur. Austin Dillon served as his replacement in the No. 1 for Atlanta, while Josh Berry did so for New Hampshire. On October 6, 2021, Annett announced his retirement from full-time racing.

Sam Mayer (2022–2024)

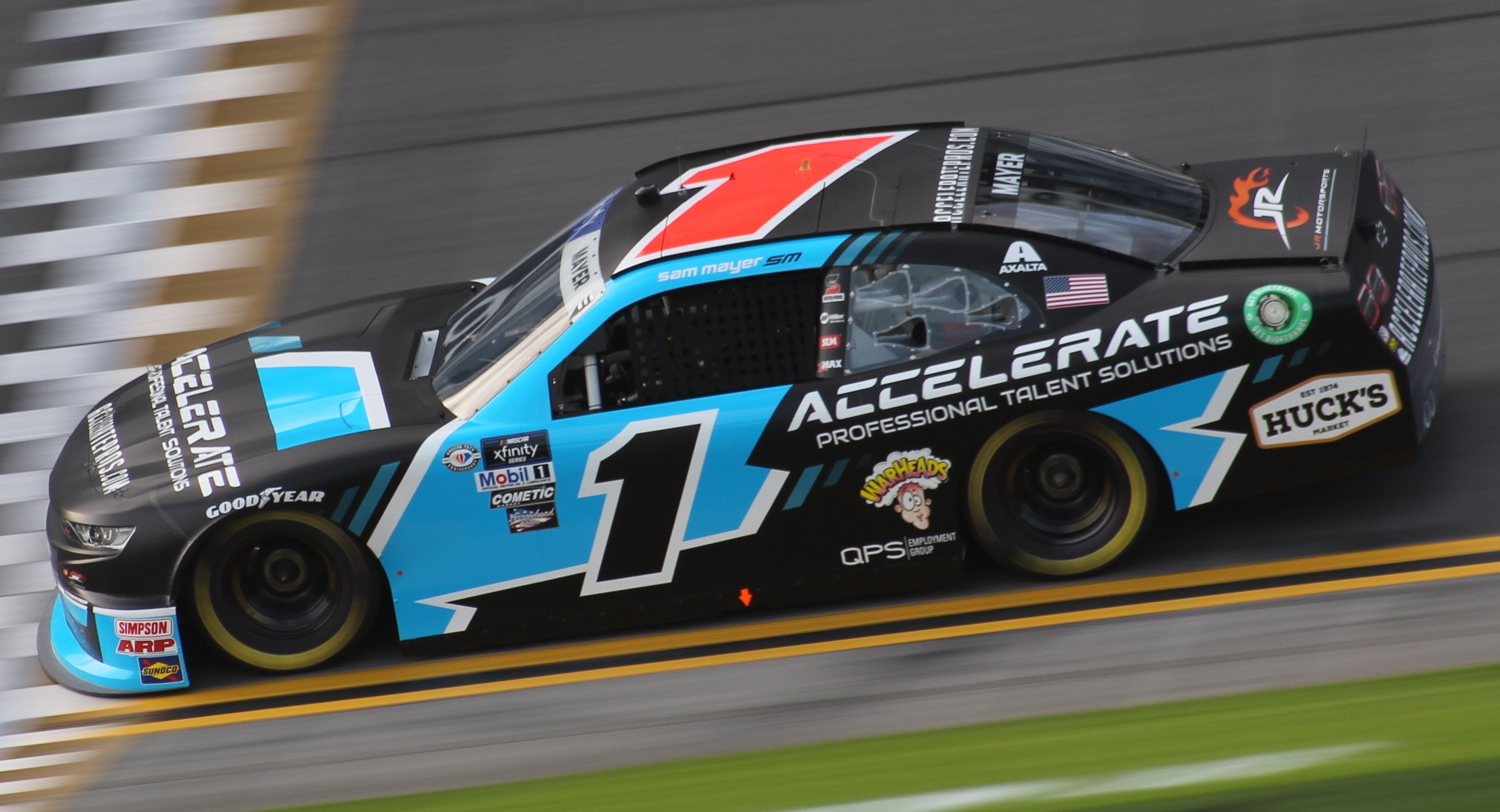
Sam Mayer at Daytona International Speedway in 2023

Sam Mayer was announced the new full-time driver of the No. 1 on January 4, 2022. He started the season with a 30th-place finish at Daytona and scored four top-five finishes in the first 10 races. On May 3, crew chief Taylor Moyer was suspended for four races due to a tire and wheel loss at Dover. Andrew Overstreet was announced as the crew chief of the No. 1 for Darlington.

On August 9, 2022, it was announced that Mayer would return for the 2023 season. He started the 2023 season with a 27th place finish at Daytona. Mayer scored his first career win at Road America. He followed it up with his second win at Watkins Glen. During the playoffs, Mayer won at the Charlotte Roval and at Homestead to make the Championship 4. Mayer finished fifth at Phoenix and third in the points standings.

Mayer started the 2024 season with a 36th place DNF at Daytona. At Texas, he beat Ryan Sieg by 0.002 seconds to win the race and a Dash 4 Cash bonus of US$100,000. He scored his second win of the season at Iowa. Mayer announced his departure to Haas Factory Team for the 2025 season on August 17, 2024. During the playoffs, he was disqualified at Talladega after his car failed the post-race ride height requirement. A week later, Mayer won at the Charlotte Roval.

Carson Kvapil (2025)

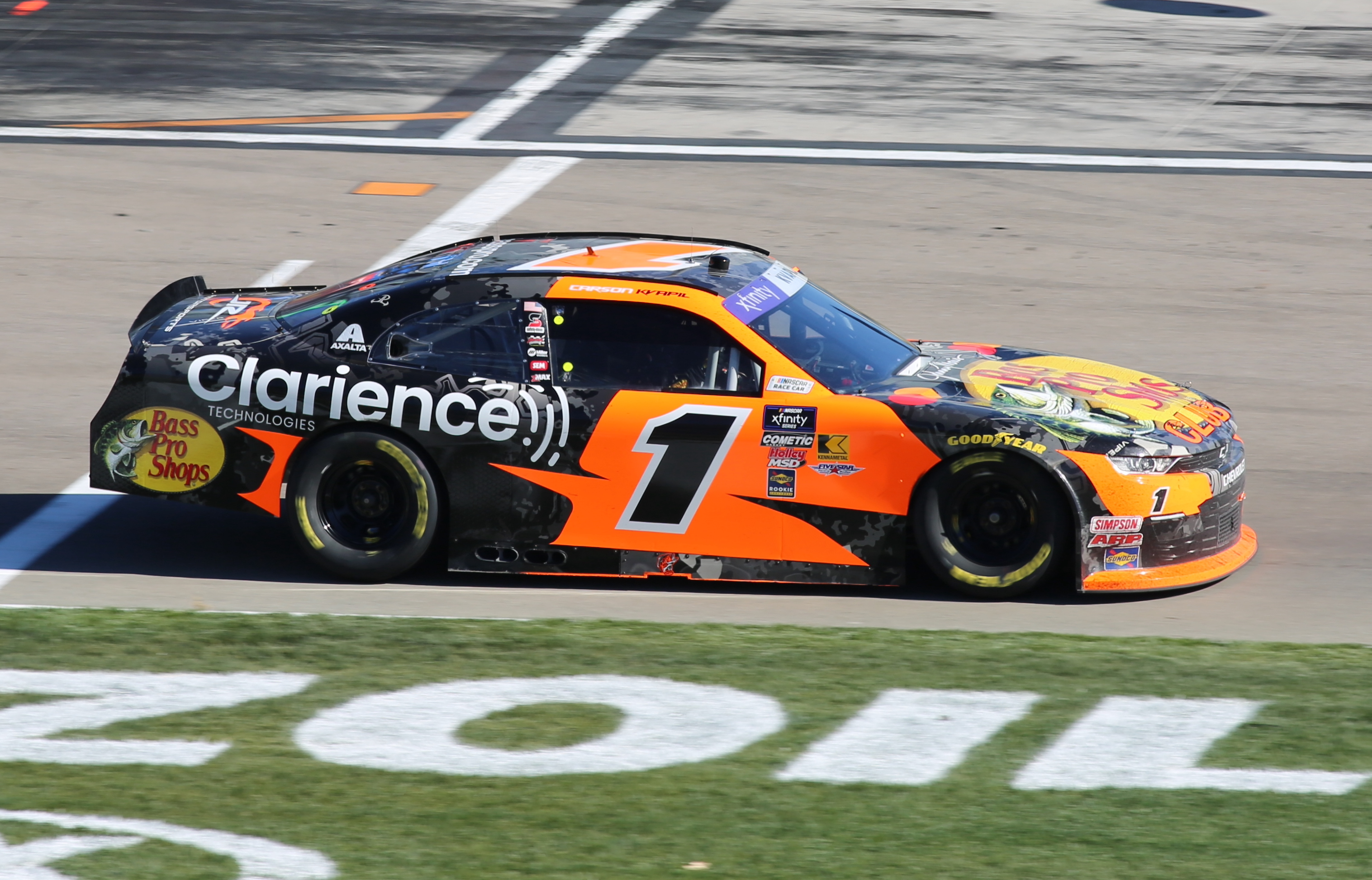
Carson Kvapil in the No. 1 car at Las Vegas Motor Speedway in 2025

On October 1, 2024, it was announced that Carson Kvapil will run full-time in 2025 driving the No. 1 Chevrolet.

Carson Kvapil and Connor Zilisch (2026)

On September 24, 2025, it was announced that Carson Kvapil and Connor Zilisch will share the No. 1 car for the 2026 season. It was also announced that Rodney Childers is going to be the crew chief. Zillisch won at Bristol and Watkins Glen. During the race at Kansas, Kvapil was involved in a major crash on lap 2. As the caution was being thrown for an incident involving Josh Bilicki and Kyle Sieg, Kvapil was clipped in the left rear by William Byron. The contact sent Kvapil spinning into the wall and into the path of Parker Retzlaff. The collision with Retzlaff allowed enough air to get underneath his car, flipping it onto its roof. Kvapil's car slid on its roof before flipping once and coming to a stop upside down. After the red flag was thrown, Kvapil was flipped back onto all four wheels by safety crews, Kvapil got out of the car under his own power, and was released from the infield care center shortly after. He scored his first career victory at Indianapolis. He scored his second victory at the next event at Iowa. He scored his third victory at fall Martinsville race.

Return to Sam Mayer (2027)

On September 22, 2026, JRM announced that Mayer will return to the No. 1 car in 2027.

==== Car No. 1 results ====
Year	Driver	No.	Make	1	2	3	4	5	6	7	8	9	10	11	12	13	14	15	16	17	18	19	20	21	22	23	24	25	26	27	28	29	30	31	32	33	Owners	Pts
2016	Elliott Sadler	1	Chevy	DAY; 4	ATL; 9	LVS; 8	PHO; 8	CAL; 5	TEX; 7	BRI; 15	RCH; 3	TAL; 1	DOV; 6	CLT; 28	POC; 6	MCH; 5	IOW; 6	DAY; 18	KEN; 6	NHA; 10	IND; 6	IOW; 3	GLN; 6	MOH; 9	BRI; 4	ROA; 8	DAR; 1*	RCH; 4	CHI; 3	KEN; 1	DOV; 7	CLT; 2	KAN; 2	TEX; 6	PHO; 13	HOM; 3	2nd	4038
2017	Elliott Sadler	1	Chevy	DAY; 24*	ATL; 5	LVS; 8	PHO; 5	CAL; 7	TEX; 10	BRI; 4	RCH; 7	TAL; 2	CLT; 35	DOV; 7	POC; 4	MCH; 3	IOW; 8	DAY; 2	KEN; 12	NHA; 7	IND; 4	IOW; 12	GLN; 18	MOH; 6	BRI; 3	ROA; 14	DAR; 33	RCH; 5	CHI; 3	KEN; 6	DOV; 9	CLT; 10	KAN; 7	TEX; 4	PHO; 18	HOM; 8	6th	2255
2018	Elliott Sadler	1	Chevy	DAY; 2	ATL; 5	LVS; 5	PHO; 9	CAL; 3	TEX; 8	BRI; 4	RCH; 3	TAL; 5	DOV; 2	CLT; 5	POC; 6	MCH; 30	IOW; 28	CHI; 6	DAY; 2	KEN; 12	NHA; 8	IOW; 6	GLN; 12	MOH; 6	BRI; 6	ROA; 5	DAR; 5	IND; 35	LVS; 5	RCH; 6	CLT; 14	DOV; 11	KAN; 3	TEX; 8	PHO; 11	HOM; 14	7th	2248
2019	Michael Annett	1	Chevy	DAY; 1*	ATL; 12	LVS; 5	PHO; 8	CAL; 13	TEX; 6	BRI; 8	RCH; 13	TAL; 31	DOV; 10	CLT; 6	POC; 8	MCH; 3	IOW; 9	CHI; 3	DAY; 25	KEN; 4	NHA; 11	IOW; 10	GLN; 8	MOH; 13	BRI; 9	ROA; 12	DAR; 13	IND; 12	LVS; 13	RCH; 9	CLT; 15	DOV; 6	KAN; 4	TEX; 11	PHO; 9	HOM; 11	8th	2239
2020	Michael Annett	1	Chevy	DAY; 11	LVS; 7	CAL; 17	PHO; 17	DAR; 25	CLT; 7	BRI; 37	ATL; 11	HOM; 6	HOM; 18	TAL; 12	POC; 5	IND; 9	KEN; 5	KEN; 8	TEX; 5	KAN; 8	ROA; 10	DAY; 15	DOV; 9	DOV; 8	DAY; 7	DAR; 8	RCH; 7	RCH; 7	BRI; 31	LVS; 7	TAL; 37	CLT; 9	KAN; 8	TEX; 6	MAR; 8	PHO; 4	10th	2204
2021	Michael Annett	1	Chevy	DAY; 36	DAY; 15	HOM; 13	LVS; 6	PHO; 38	ATL; 7	MAR; 10	TAL; 32	DAR; 7	DOV; 7	COA; 11	CLT; 24	MOH; 7	TEX; 10	NSH; 12	POC; 12	ROA; 3			GLN; 11			DAY; 30	DAR; 14	RCH; 22				CLT; 27	TEX; 9	KAN; 7	MAR; 38	PHO; 11	8th	2195
2021	Austin Dillon	1	Chevy																		ATL; 11																8th	2195
2021	Josh Berry	1	Chevy																			NHA; 8			MCH; 4				BRI; 35	LVS; 1	TAL; 9						8th	2195
2021	Chase Elliott	1	Chevy																					IND; 4													8th	2195
2022	Sam Mayer	1	Chevy	DAY; 30	CAL; 6	LVS; 25	PHO; 22	ATL; 21	COA; 5	RCH; 3	MAR; 5	TAL; 28	DOV; 5	DAR; 5	TEX; 3	CLT; 3	PIR; 38	NSH; 5	ROA; 20	ATL; 34	NHA; 15	POC; 6	IND; 7	MCH; 33	GLN; 6	DAY; 34	DAR; 11	KAN; 9	BRI; 4	TEX; 8	TAL; 2	CLT; 11	LVS; 7	HOM; 5	MAR; 6	PHO; 34	8th	2239
2023	Sam Mayer	1	Chevy	DAY; 27	CAL; 2	LVS; 7	PHO; 11	ATL; 9	COA; 7	RCH; 17	MAR; 31	TAL; 29	DOV; 9	DAR; 8	CLT; 35	PIR; 3	SON; 10	NSH; 3	CSC; 18	ATL; 5	NHA; 18	POC; 2	ROA; 1	MCH; 5	IRC; 2	GLN; 1	DAY; 19	DAR; 11	KAN; 37	BRI; 35	TEX; 38	ROV; 1*	LVS; 5	HOM; 1	MAR; 25	PHO; 5	3rd	4032
2024	Sam Mayer	1	Chevy	DAY; 36	ATL; 11	LVS; 38	PHO; 34	COA; 9	RCH; 30	MAR; 2	TEX; 1	TAL; 36	DOV; 3	DAR; 4	CLT; 4*	PIR; 28	SON; 3	IOW; 1	NHA; 19	NSH; 10	CSC; 19	POC; 10	IND; 37	MCH; 37	DAY; 13	DAR; 28	ATL; 36	GLN; 20	BRI; 9	KAN; 13	TAL; 38	ROV; 1	LVS; 14	HOM; 9	MAR; 30	PHO; 11	10th	2205
2025	Carson Kvapil	1	Chevy	DAY; 4	ATL; 23	COA; 23	PHO; 26	LVS; 17	HOM; 10	MAR; 20	DAR; 5	BRI; 2	ROC; 16	TAL; 17	TEX; 19	CLT; 17	NSH; 9	MXC; 19	POC; 6	ATL; 2	CSC; 16	SON; 8	DOV; 15	IND; 30	IOW; 9	GLN; 5	DAY; 10	PIR; 6	GTW; 37	BRI; 4	KAN; 15	ROV; 15	LVS; 15	TAL; 2	MAR; 18	PHO; 13	7th	2231
2026	Carson Kvapil	1	Chevy	DAY; 7	ATL; 32		PHO; 3		DAR; 5	MAR; 28	CAR; 5		KAN; 37	TAL; 22			DOV; 7		NSH; 7		COR; 4			ATL; 2	IND; 1	IOW; 1	DAY; 3*	DAR; 12	GTW; 5*	BRI; 24*	LVS; 2	CLT; 32	PHO; 10	TAL; 2*	MAR; 1*	HOM; 2	3rd	2449
2026	Connor Zilisch	1	Chevy			COA; 21		LVS; 7				BRI; 1			TEX; 21	GLN; 1		CLT; 6		POC; 9		SON; 2	CHI; 10														3rd	2449

=== Car No. 5 history ===
Multiple drivers (2008–2009)

The No. 5 car joined in 2008 as part of the merger with Hendrick Motorsports' Nationwide teams. It was driven by Jimmie Johnson, Dale Earnhardt Jr., Martin Truex Jr., Mark Martin, Landon Cassill, Ron Fellows and Adrian Fernandez, with sponsorship from Lowe's (Johnson and Fernandez), National Guard (Truex Jr, Earnhardt Jr and Cassill), Delphi, (Martin) and Godaddy.com (Earnhardt Jr and Fellows). The No. 5 car won two races in 2008, with Martin at Las Vegas and Ron Fellows in Montreal, the first NASCAR race run in the rain.

The 5 car returned in 2009 with sponsorship from Fastenal, GoDaddy.com, Unilever and Delphi. The team's best finish was a third with Earnhardt Jr at Atlanta.

Part-time (2011–2012)

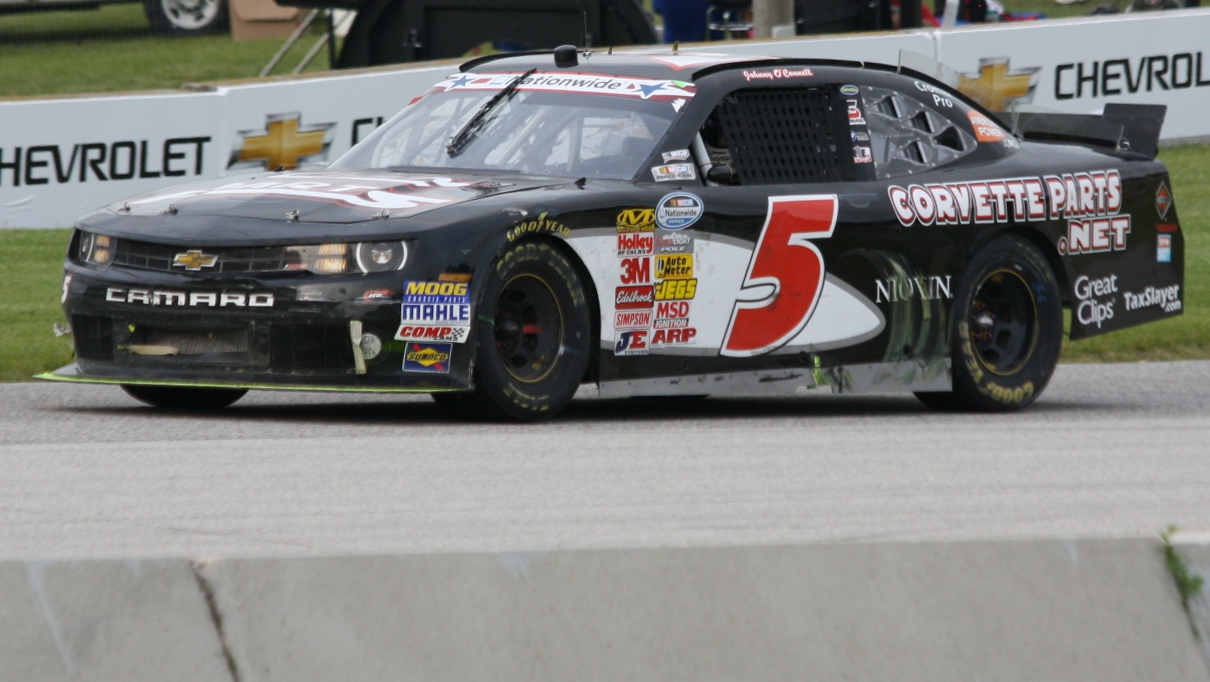
Johnny O'Connell at Road America in 2013

In 2011, the 5 car returned as JR Motorsports' 3rd entry, with Dale Earnhardt Jr. and Ron Fellows running a handful of races part-time. The car returned in 2012 once more with Dale Jr. and Fellows driving, and Regan Smith would win the Ford 300 after announcing his addition to the team. Ron Fellows would nearly win a few races at Road America in 2011 & 2012, and then at Watkins Glen in 2012 before running one last race for the team in the inaugural race at Mid-Ohio Sports Car Course in 2013. Fellows would part ways with the team at year's end, due to a sponsor conflict related to NAPA Auto Parts joining the team for 2014.

Kasey Kahne and Brad Sweet (2013)

The car was originally slated for Smith in 2013, but he was moved to the No. 7 when Jr's Cup teammate Kasey Kahne and USAC driver Brad Sweet signed to drive the No. 5 with sponsorship from Great Clips.

Multiple drivers (2014–2016)

On Monday, October 14, 2013, JR Motorsports announced that Kevin Harvick would begin driving the No. 5 car in at least twelve races for the 2014 season. In four of the races, the car was sponsored by Hunt Brothers Pizza. Super Late Model driver Austin Theriault drove the car in a three races for the team starting at Iowa. JR development driver Josh Berry drove two races starting at Iowa in August. For 2015, the No. 5 was driven by Kahne in a single race at Charlotte as a 4th team car, where he finished 3rd.

Michael Annett (2017–2018)

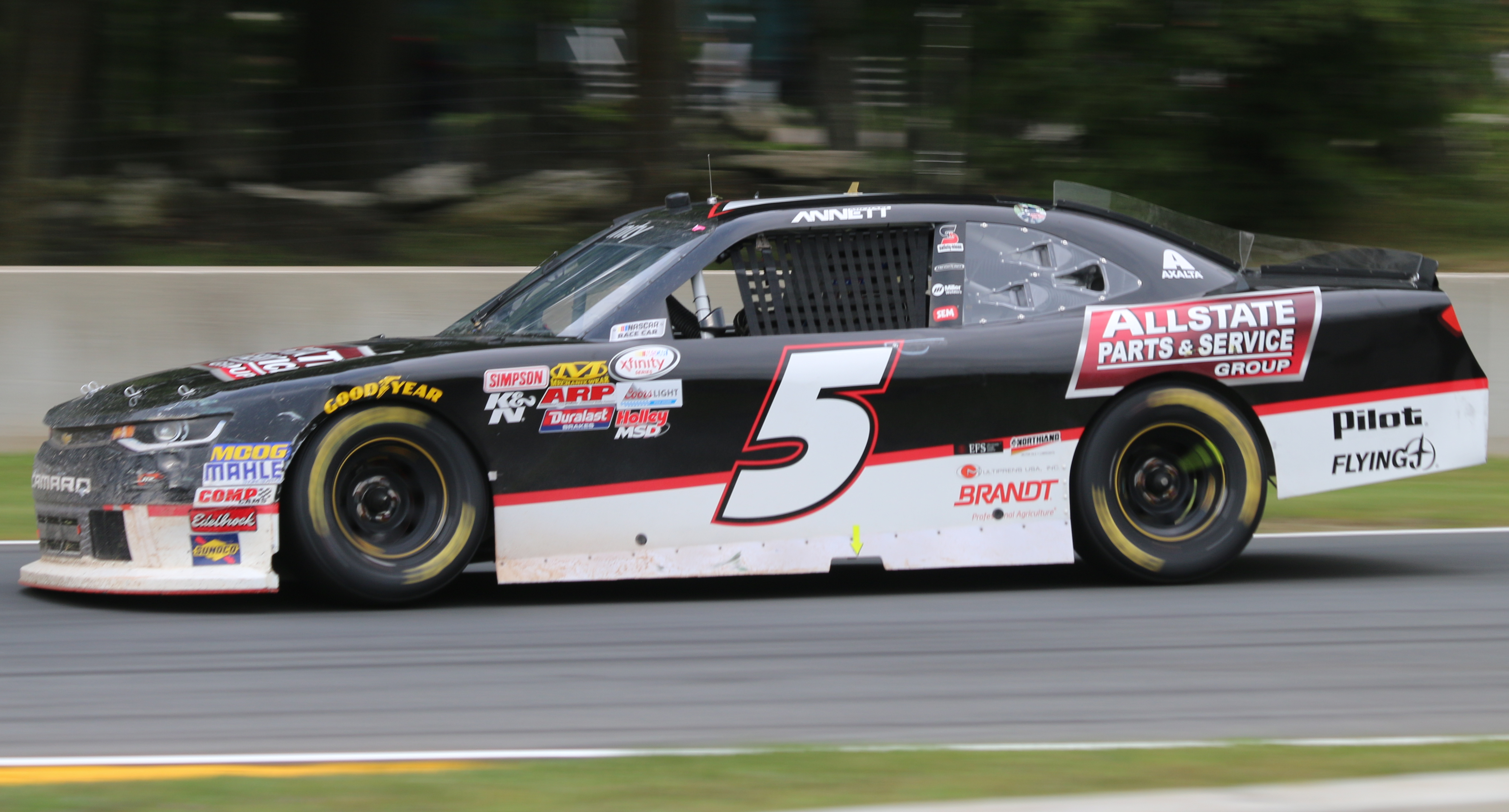
Annett's No. 5 at Road America in 2017

Michael Annett drove the car full-time in 2017 with Pilot Flying J as the sponsor en route to a ninth place finish in the standings as well as earning a career-best second place finish at Road America.

On January 25, 2019, it was announced that Annett would be piloting the No. 1 car with the points from the No. 5 car going over to the No. 1 car with the No. 5 car being shut down.

==== Car No. 5 results ====
Year	Driver	No.	Make	1	2	3	4	5	6	7	8	9	10	11	12	13	14	15	16	17	18	19	20	21	22	23	24	25	26	27	28	29	30	31	32	33	34	35	Owners	Pts
2008	Dale Earnhardt Jr.	5	Chevy	DAY; 3	CAL; 7		ATL; 15			TEX; 7			TAL; 6									DAY; 3					GLN; 30											HOM; 3	11th	4206
2008	Mark Martin	5	Chevy			LVS; 1*									DAR; 23													MCH; 4					KAN; 38			TEX; 3			11th	4206
2008	Martin Truex Jr.	5	Chevy					BRI; 41																															11th	4206
2008	Landon Cassill	5	Chevy						NSH; 19		PHO; 22			RCH; 23			DOV; 25	NSH; 9	KEN; 11	MLW; 22	NHA; 34		CHI; 10	GTY; 6	IRP; 7				BRI; 22		RCH; 12	DOV; 25			MEM; 13		PHO; 6		11th	4206
2008	Adrián Fernández	5	Chevy									MXC; 14																											11th	4206
2008	Jimmie Johnson	5	Chevy													CLT; 10														CAL; 17				CLT; 33					11th	4206
2008	Ron Fellows	5	Chevy																							CGV; 1													11th	4206
2009	Dale Earnhardt Jr.	5	Chevy	DAY; 7	CAL	LVS; 5	BRI	TEX; 20	NSH	PHO	TAL; 5			CLT; 13						DAY; 40									ATL; 3										31st	2704
2009	Mark Martin	5	Chevy									RCH; 7																											31st	2704
2009	Scott Wimmer	5	Chevy										DAR; 9					MLW; 18	NHA				IRP; 9	IOW; 31						RCH; 18	DOV	KAN; 12	CAL						31st	2704
2009	Ryan Newman	5	Chevy												DOV; 32	NSH	KEN				CHI; 22	GTY				MCH; 6	BRI; 13												31st	2704
2009	Ron Fellows	5	Chevy																						GLN; 5			CGV; 35											31st	2704
2009	Tony Stewart	5	Chevy																															CLT; 11					31st	2704
2009	Richard Boswell	5	Chevy																																MEM; 23	TEX	PHO		31st	2704
2009	Kelly Bires	5	Chevy																																			HOM; 29	31st	2704
2011	Dale Earnhardt Jr.	5	Chevy	DAY; 4	PHO	LVS	BRI; 3	CAL	TEX	TAL	NSH	RCH	DAR	DOV	IOW	CLT	CHI	MCH	ROA	DAY	KEN	NHA	NSH	IRP	IOW														40th	153
2011	Ron Fellows	5	Chevy																							GLN; 7	CGV; 11	BRI	ATL	RCH	CHI	DOV	KAN	CLT	TEX	PHO	HOM		40th	153
2012	Dale Earnhardt Jr.	5	Chevy	DAY; 15	PHO	LVS	BRI; 5	CAL	TEX; 14	RCH	TAL; 4	DAR	IOW	CLT	DOV	MCH																							35th	306
2012	Ron Fellows	5	Chevy														ROA; 3	KEN	DAY	NHA	CHI	IND	IOW	GLN; 5	CGV; 5	BRI	ATL	RCH	CHI	KEN	DOV	CLT	KAN	TEX	PHO				35th	306
2012	Regan Smith	5	Chevy																																	HOM; 1			35th	306
2013	Kasey Kahne	5	Chevy	DAY; 20					TEX; 8		TAL; 3	DAR; 9	CLT; 2	DOV; 6						NHA; 19		IND; 26		GLN; 18		BRI; 8	ATL; 4												14th	930
2013	Jimmie Johnson	5	Chevy		PHO; 12																																		14th	930
2013	Brad Sweet	5	Chevy			LVS; 12	BRI; 22	CAL; 22							IOW; 34	MCH; 6		KEN; 14	DAY; 28		CHI; 9		IOW; 15						CHI; 20	KEN; 30	DOV; 13	KAN; 8	CLT; 26	TEX; 10	PHO; 28	HOM; 31			14th	930
2013	Jeffrey Earnhardt	5	Chevy							RCH; 17																													14th	930
2013	Johnny O'Connell	5	Chevy														ROA; 12																						14th	930
2013	Ron Fellows	5	Chevy																						MOH; 25														14th	930
2013	Jamie McMurray	5	Chevy																									RCH; 10											14th	930
2014	Kevin Harvick	5	Chevy	DAY	PHO	LVS	BRI; 3	CAL; 2	TEX; 4*	DAR; 7	RCH; 1*			CLT; 4	DOV	MCH	ROA	KEN; 1				IND; 4*				BRI; 7	ATL; 1*	RCH; 3	CHI; 1			KAN; 2*		TEX; 8					12th	1009
2014	Kasey Kahne	5	Chevy									TAL; 22							DAY; 1		CHI; 4																		12th	1009
2014	Austin Theriault	5	Chevy										IOW; 15							NHA; 21										KEN; 18	DOV								12th	1009
2014	Josh Berry	5	Chevy																				IOW; 12	GLN	MOH											HOM; 25			12th	1009
2014	Alex Bowman	5	Chevy																														CLT; 12		PHO; 17				12th	1009
2015	Kasey Kahne	5	Chevy	DAY	ATL	LVS	PHO	CAL	TEX	BRI	RCH	TAL	IOW	CLT; 3	DOV	MCH	CHI	DAY	KEN	NHA	IND	IOW	GLN	MOH	BRI	ROA	DAR	RCH	CHI	KEN	DOV	CLT	KAN	TEX	PHO	HOM				
2016	Kasey Kahne	5	Chevy	DAY; 3	ATL	LVS	PHO	CAL																															40th	141
2016	Chase Elliott	5	Chevy						TEX; 4	BRI																													40th	141
2016	Cole Custer	5	Chevy								RCH; 6	TAL	DOV	CLT	POC	MCH	IOW	DAY	KEN	NHA	IND	IOW	GLN	MOH	BRI	ROA	DAR	RCH	CHI	KEN	DOV	CLT; DNQ	KAN; 35	TEX	PHO	HOM; 17			40th	141
2017	Michael Annett	5	Chevy	DAY; 14	ATL; 15	LVS; 21	PHO; 9	CAL; 13	TEX; 20	BRI; 10	RCH; 8	TAL; 7	CLT; 36	DOV; 14	POC; 13	MCH; 37	IOW; 6	DAY; 33	KEN; 16	NHA; 16	IND; 25	IOW; 33	GLN; 16	MOH; 19	BRI; 12	ROA; 2	DAR; 17	RCH; 15	CHI; 15	KEN; 16	DOV; 11	CLT; 27	KAN; 14	TEX; 12	PHO; 16	HOM; 9			16th	688
2018	Michael Annett	5	Chevy	DAY; 37	ATL; 20	LVS; 13	PHO; 17	CAL; 18	TEX; 15	BRI; 21	RCH; 20	TAL; 14	DOV; 15	CLT; 12	POC; 35	MCH; 17	IOW; 13	CHI; 30	DAY; 11	KEN; 15	NHA; 16	IOW; 14	GLN; 17	MOH; 18	BRI; 7	ROA; 12	DAR; 10	IND; 31	LVS; 40	RCH; 14	CLT; 20	DOV; 12	KAN; 40	TEX; 16	PHO; 16	HOM; 9			17th	495

=== Car No. 7 history ===
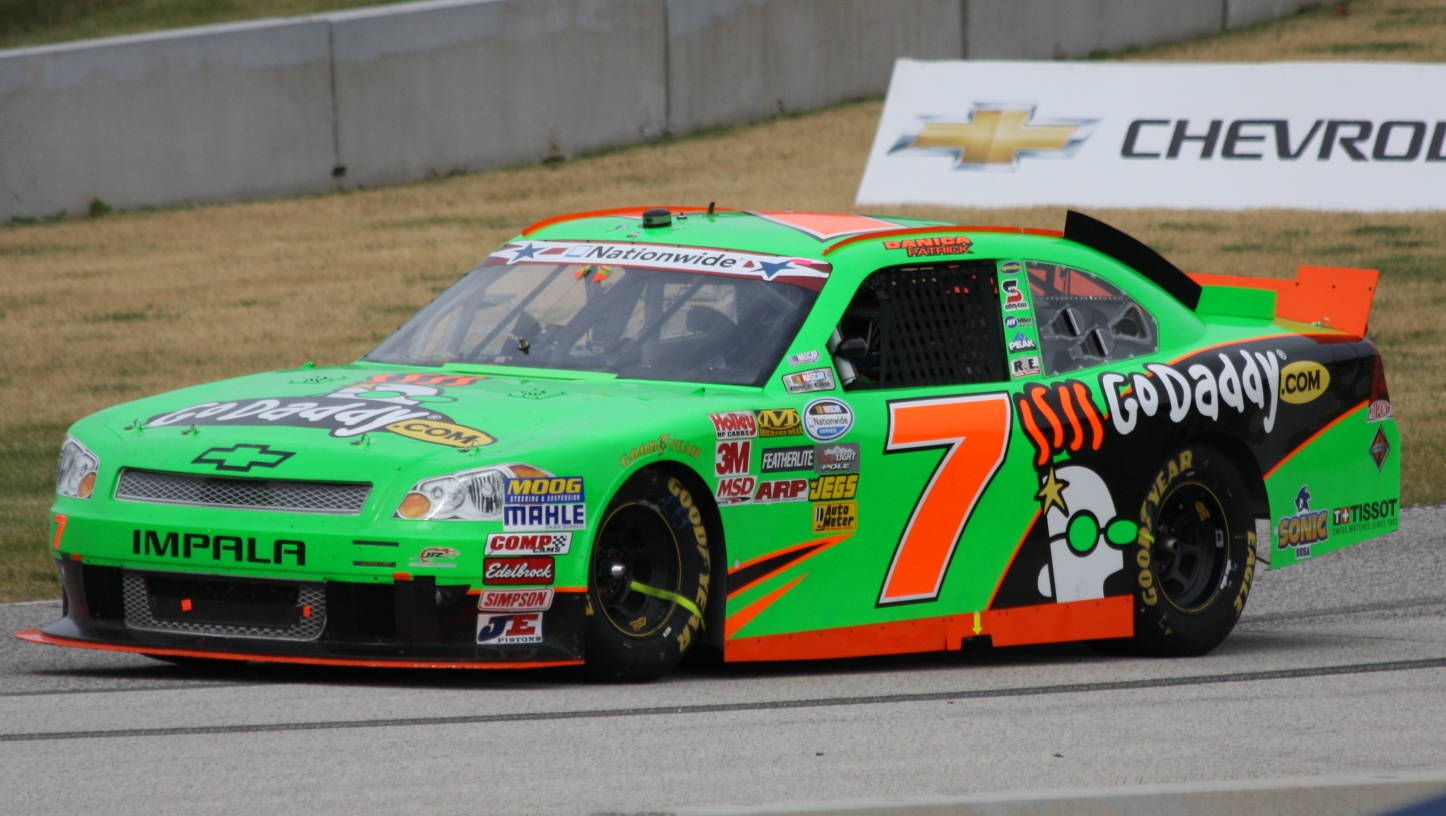
Danica Patrick driving the No. 7 in the 2012 Sargento 200

Multiple drivers (2010–2011)

The team fielded the No. 7 with Danica Patrick driving 13 races for JR Motorsports with GoDaddy.com sponsorship in 2010. The remainder of the schedule was filled out with Scott Wimmer, Dale Earnhardt Jr., Landon Cassill, Steve Arpin, Josh Wise and J. R. Fitzpatrick. Patrick recorded a best finish of fourth at Las Vegas. Wise returned to the team for 2011, recording three top tens and one top-five in fourteen starts. Earnhardt Jr. drove the car at Talladega, and Cup drivers Jimmie Johnson, Kasey Kahne and Jamie McMurray drove the car for a combined six starts that season.

Danica Patrick (2012)

Danica Patrick returned to the No. 7 in 2012, this time running a full schedule with sponsorship from GoDaddy, Tissot, and Hot Wheels. Patrick departed JR Motorsports to compete full-time in the Cup Series for the 2013 season.

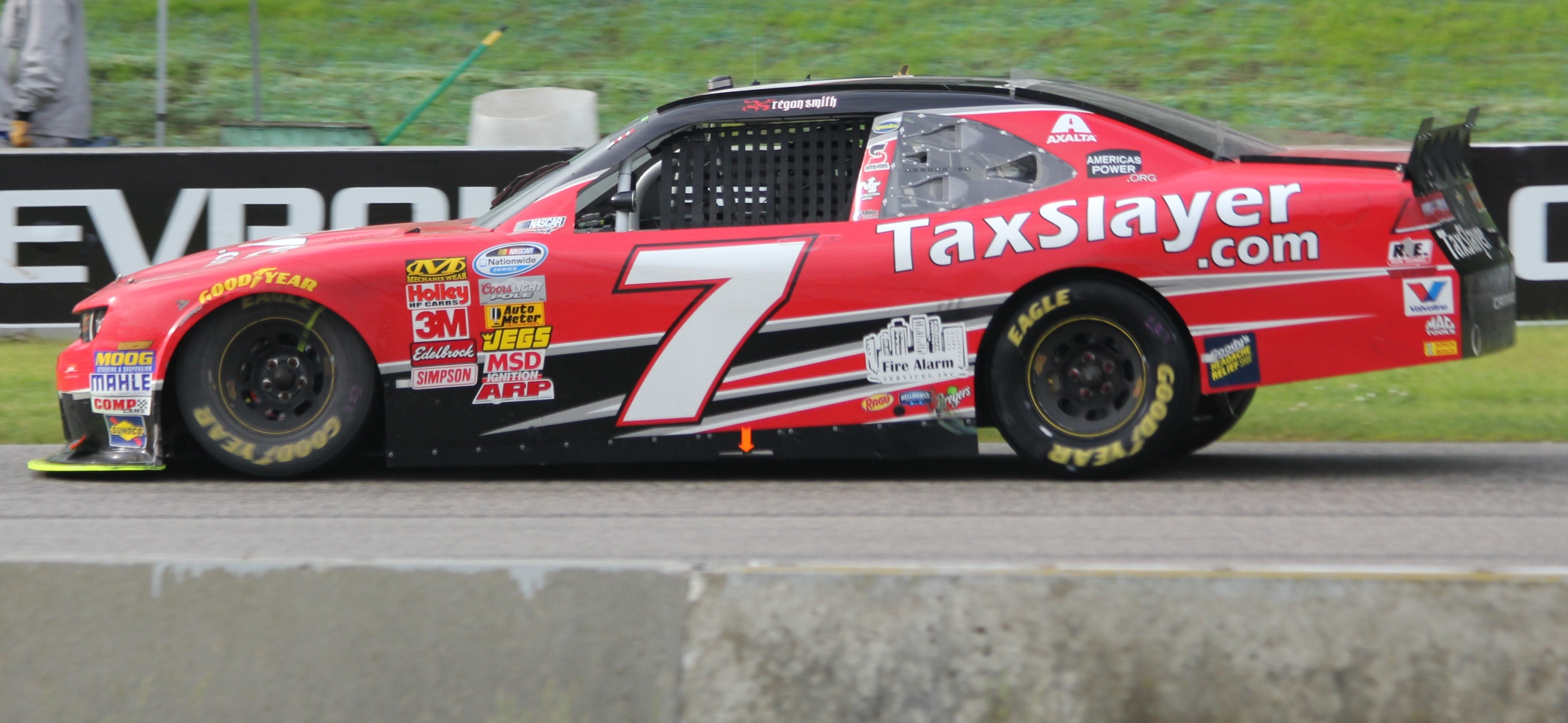
Regan Smith at Road America in 2014

Regan Smith (2013–2015)

Regan Smith, a former teammate to Dale Earnhardt Jr. at DEI who served as his substitute driver in the Cup Series late in 2012, was signed to drive for the team in 2013. Initially announced to drive the No. 5 car, he would be moved to the No. 7. Smith won twice at Talladega and Michigan, but suffered a run of bad luck in the summer and finished third in points. In 2014, Regan Smith returned to drive the No. 7 car, starting the season with a win in the DRIVE4COPD 300 at Daytona. From there, he would go on to help JRM complete a one-two points finish behind Chase Elliott. In 2015, Regan Smith returned to the No. 7 full-time. He also gained two victories including Mid-Ohio and Dover. Following the Kansas race, Smith stated that he will not return for JR Motorsports in 2016.

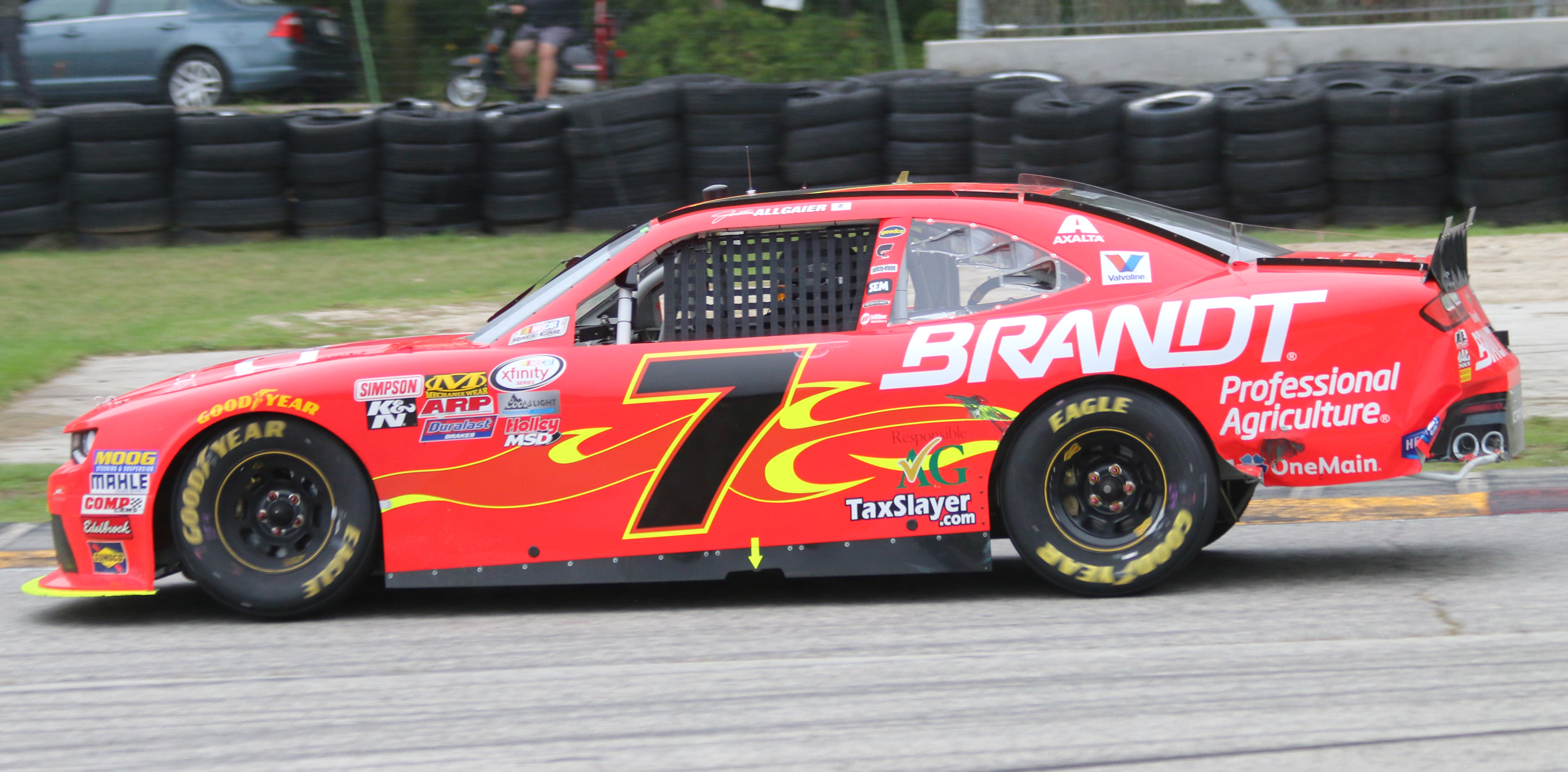
Justin Allgaier at Road America 2016

Justin Allgaier (2016–present)

Justin Allgaier would be later announced to be the new driver of the No. 7 Chevy, bringing sponsorship from BRANDT. After finishing the 2016 season 3rd in the final standings while going winless, he picked up two wins at Phoenix and Chicagoland in 2017 en route to another 3rd-place finish in the standings. In 2018, Allgaier had a career-best season winning 5 races at Dover, Iowa, Road America, Mid-Ohio, and Indianapolis while also clinching the regular-season championship, but he ended up finishing seventh in the final standings after being eliminated in the round of 8. At the second-to-last race of the 2019 season at Phoenix, Allgaier had possibly been set to finish 2nd for the sixth time of the year until he suddenly witnessed race leader Christopher Bell getting flagged for speeding on pit road at the end of Stage 2, nabbing his 1st victory of the season and 3rd Championship 4 appearance in the last four years after leading 85 laps. He finished fourth in the final points standings after finishing fourteenth at Homestead. In 2020 Allgaier rebounded from a sluggish first half of the season to win three races at Dover and sweeping the Richmond races. He would make the final four and would finish second in points to Austin Cindric. In 2021 he won twice early in the season at Atlanta and Darlington and finished the season fifth in points. In 2022, Allgaier ended a 34-race winless streak at Darlington. He would also win at Nashville and New Hampshire. Allgaier finished the season third in the points standings.

Allgaier started the 2023 season with a third place finish at Daytona. He scored his first win of the season at Charlotte. Allgaier beat Sheldon Creed by 0.005 seconds in double overtime at the Daytona night race. During the playoffs, he won at Bristol and Martinsville to make the Championship 4. Allgaier finished third at Phoenix and second in the points standings.

Allgaier started the 2024 season with an eighth place finish at Daytona. On May 11, he dominated at Darlington, winning Stages 1 and 2 before taking the checkered flag. He scored his second win of the season at Michigan. Despite not winning a race during the playoffs, Allgaier stayed consistent enough to make the Championship 4. Allgaier finished second at Phoenix and claimed his first Xfinity Series championship.

Allgaier started the 2025 season with an eighteenth place finish at Daytona. A month later, he scored back-to-back wins at Las Vegas and Homestead.

Allgaier started the 2026 with a 2nd-place finish at Daytona. During the regular season, he won at Phoenix, Darlington, Nashville, Pocono, and Atlanta to become the regular season champion. Allgaier was consistent in "The Chase" to earn his second series title.

==== Car No. 7 results ====
Year	Driver	No.	Make	1	2	3	4	5	6	7	8	9	10	11	12	13	14	15	16	17	18	19	20	21	22	23	24	25	26	27	28	29	30	31	32	33	34	35	Owners	Pts
2010	Danica Patrick	7	Chevy	DAY; 35	CAL; 31	LVS; 36													NHA; 30		CHI; 24					MCH; 27					DOV; 35		CAL; 30	CLT; 21	GTY; 22	TEX; 22	PHO; 32	HOM; 19	17th	3585
2010	Scott Wimmer	7	Chevy				BRI; 10	NSH; 7																															17th	3585
2010	Landon Cassill	7	Chevy						PHO; 35	TEX; 18				DOV; 20																									17th	3585
2010	Steve Arpin	7	Chevy								TAL; 26	RCH; 25	DAR; 29		CLT; 34					DAY; 10																			17th	3585
2010	Josh Wise	7	Chevy													NSH; 16	KEN; 15					GTY; 8	IRP; 16	IOW; 11			BRI; 15		ATL; 11			KAN; 13							17th	3585
2010	J. R. Fitzpatrick	7	Chevy															ROA; 7							GLN; 11			CGV; 7											17th	3585
2010	Aric Almirola	7	Chevy																											RCH; 11									17th	3585
2011	Danica Patrick	7	Chevy	DAY; 14	PHO; 17	LVS; 4	BRI; 33										CHI; 10			DAY; 10							CGV; 24			RCH; 18			KAN; 15		TEX; 11	PHO; 21	HOM; 32		12th	1018
2011	Josh Wise	7	Chevy					CAL; 16	TEX; 14		NSH; 9	RCH; 6	DAR; 14	DOV; 17	IOW; 29	CLT; 17		MCH; 16					NSH; 20	IRP; 19	IOW; 4			BRI; 16						CLT; 14					12th	1018
2011	Dale Earnhardt Jr.	7	Chevy							TAL; 8																													12th	1018
2011	Ron Fellows	7	Chevy																ROA; 2																				12th	1018
2011	Kasey Kahne	7	Chevy																		KEN; 4	NHA; 3																	12th	1018
2011	Jimmie Johnson	7	Chevy																							GLN; 2													12th	1018
2011	Jamie McMurray	7	Chevy																										ATL; 21		CHI; 7	DOV; 17							12th	1018
2012	Danica Patrick	7	Chevy	DAY; 38	PHO; 21	LVS; 12	BRI; 19	CAL; 35	TEX; 8	RCH; 21	TAL; 13	DAR; 12	IOW; 30	CLT; 13	DOV; 30	MCH; 18	ROA; 12	KEN; 12	DAY; 31	NHA; 14	CHI; 14	IND; 35	IOW; 11	GLN; 43	CGV; 27	BRI; 9	ATL; 13	RCH; 29	CHI; 12	KEN; 14	DOV; 16	CLT; 11	KAN; 10	TEX; 14	PHO; 10	HOM; 13			17th	838
2013	Regan Smith	7	Chevy	DAY; 14*	PHO; 11	LVS; 7	BRI; 6	CAL; 3	TEX; 7	RCH; 5	TAL; 1	DAR; 7	CLT; 10	DOV; 9	IOW; 7	MCH; 1	ROA; 32	KEN; 30	DAY; 8	NHA; 8	CHI; 13	IND; 19	IOW; 11	GLN; 4	MOH; 15	BRI; 21	ATL; 9	RCH; 3	CHI; 13	KEN; 12	DOV; 15	KAN; 3*	CLT; 19	TEX; 6	PHO; 4	HOM; 29			5th	1108
2014	Regan Smith	7	Chevy	DAY; 1	PHO; 8	LVS; 10	BRI; 10	CAL; 10	TEX; 7	DAR; 8	RCH; 8	TAL; 3	IOW; 3	CLT; 7	DOV; 10	MCH; 7	ROA; 13	KEN; 28	DAY; 2*	NHA; 10	CHI; 16	IND; 10	IOW; 6	GLN; 17	MOH; 2	BRI; 5	ATL; 6	RCH; 6	CHI; 8	KEN; 5	DOV; 8	KAN; 22	CLT; 11	TEX; 11	PHO; 10	HOM; 6			5th	1171
2015	Regan Smith	7	Chevy	DAY; 35	ATL; 9	LVS; 3	PHO; 9	CAL; 9	TEX; 4	BRI; 30	RCH; 3	TAL; 9	IOW; 11	CLT; 4	DOV; 3	MCH; 11	CHI; 13	DAY; 17	KEN; 10	NHA; 7	IND; 8	IOW; 2	GLN; 20	MOH; 1	BRI; 9	ROA; 8	DAR; 9	RCH; 6	CHI; 9	KEN; 3	DOV; 1	CLT; 5	KAN; 5	TEX; 9	PHO; 6	HOM; 9			8th	1168
2016	Justin Allgaier	7	Chevy	DAY; 12	ATL; 8	LVS; 9	PHO; 4	CAL; 10	TEX; 6	BRI; 5	RCH; 35	TAL; 2	DOV; 4	CLT; 5	POC; 39	MCH; 8	IOW; 7	DAY; 2	KEN; 31	NHA; 7	IND; 5	IOW; 7	GLN; 7	MOH; 5	BRI; 2	ROA; 6	DAR; 11	RCH; 5	CHI; 5	KEN; 9	DOV; 3	CLT; 6	KAN; 14	TEX; 10	PHO; 4	HOM; 6			5th	2239
2017	Justin Allgaier	7	Chevy	DAY; 30	ATL; 30	LVS; 4	PHO; 1*	CAL; 9	TEX; 13	BRI; 14	RCH; 2*	TAL; 8*	CLT; 12	DOV; 11	POC; 2	MCH; 16	IOW; 9	DAY; 30	KEN; 8	NHA; 32	IND; 35	IOW; 20	GLN; 4	MOH; 31	BRI; 5	ROA; 11	DAR; 8	RCH; 8	CHI; 1	KEN; 3	DOV; 2	CLT; 33	KAN; 5	TEX; 11	PHO; 10	HOM; 12			7th	2241
2018	Justin Allgaier	7	Chevy	DAY; 31	ATL; 6	LVS; 4	PHO; 2*	CAL; 2	TEX; 35	BRI; 2	RCH; 14	TAL; 3	DOV; 1*	CLT; 32	POC; 37	MCH; 9	IOW; 1*	CHI; 7	DAY; 9	KEN; 4	NHA; 7	IOW; 2	GLN; 3	MOH; 1	BRI; 3	ROA; 1*	DAR; 7	IND; 1*	LVS; 2	RCH; 32	CLT; 15	DOV; 3	KAN; 38	TEX; 5	PHO; 24	HOM; 7			8th	2234
2019	Justin Allgaier	7	Chevy	DAY; 2	ATL; 3	LVS; 31	PHO; 14	CAL; 9	TEX; 12	BRI; 30*	RCH; 3	TAL; 28	DOV; 2	CLT; 2	POC; 11	MCH; 5	IOW; 3	CHI; 32	DAY; 17	KEN; 7	NHA; 3	IOW; 6	GLN; 3	MOH; 6	BRI; 8	ROA; 9	DAR; 9	IND; 2	LVS; 5	RCH; 4	CLT; 4	DOV; 2	KAN; 5	TEX; 6	PHO; 1	HOM; 14			4th	4023
2020	Justin Allgaier	7	Chevy	DAY; 30	LVS; 8	CAL; 11	PHO; 12	DAR; 3	CLT; 5	BRI; 18	ATL; 6	HOM; 32	HOM; 22	TAL; 28	POC; 6	IND; 7	KEN; 20	KEN; 5	TEX; 3*	KAN; 10	ROA; 30	DAY; 9	DOV; 1*	DOV; 7	DAY; 29	DAR; 31	RCH; 1*	RCH; 1*	BRI; 5*	LVS; 4	TAL; 29	CLT; 23	KAN; 10	TEX; 26	MAR; 2	PHO; 5*			2nd	4032
2021	Justin Allgaier	7	Chevy	DAY; 28	DAY; 26	HOM; 38	LVS; 14	PHO; 8	ATL; 1	MAR; 9	TAL; 29	DAR; 1	DOV; 3*	COA; 3	CLT; 11	MOH; 35	TEX; 2	NSH; 2	POC; 3	ROA; 12	ATL; 7	NHA; 2	GLN; 4	IND; 11	MCH; 6	DAY; 3	DAR; 6	RCH; 4	BRI; 4	LVS; 2	TAL; 3	CLT; 9	TEX; 4	KAN; 9	MAR; 5	PHO; 9			6th	2299
2022	Justin Allgaier	7	Chevy	DAY; 5	CAL; 8	LVS; 5*	PHO; 10	ATL; 34	COA; 33	RCH; 14	MAR; 29	TAL; 22	DOV; 2	DAR; 1*	TEX; 4	CLT; 7	PIR; 5	NSH; 1*	ROA; 12	ATL; 7	NHA; 1	POC; 7	IND; 3	MCH; 2	GLN; 38	DAY; 13	DAR; 4	KAN; 2	BRI; 9	TEX; 29	TAL; 15	CLT; 5	LVS; 2	HOM; 10	MAR; 5	PHO; 3			3rd	4034
2023	Justin Allgaier	7	Chevy	DAY; 3	CAL; 3	LVS; 2	PHO; 36	ATL; 29	COA; 5	RCH; 13	MAR; 6	TAL; 28	DOV; 3	DAR; 2	CLT; 1*	PIR; 2	SON; 7	NSH; 15	CSC; 3	ATL; 17	NHA; 6	POC; 23	ROA; 18*	MCH; 14	IRC; 5	GLN; 16	DAY; 1	DAR; 7	KAN; 18	BRI; 1*	TEX; 5*	ROV; 37	LVS; 6	HOM; 15	MAR; 1	PHO; 3			2nd	4034
2024	Justin Allgaier	7	Chevy	DAY; 8	ATL; 28	LVS; 10	PHO; 29	COA; 13	RCH; 11	MAR; 5	TEX; 3*	TAL; 38	DOV; 17	DAR; 1*	CLT; 33	PIR; 2*	SON; 7	IOW; 30	NHA; 4	NSH; 8	CSC; 9	POC; 2*	IND; 9	MCH; 1*	DAY; 7	DAR; 10	ATL; 30	GLN; 17	BRI; 30	KAN; 36	TAL; 25	ROV; 7	LVS; 3	HOM; 8	MAR; 5	PHO; 2			1st	4035
2025	Justin Allgaier	7	Chevy	DAY; 18	ATL; 2	COA; 29	PHO; 5	LVS; 1*	HOM; 1	MAR; 3	DAR; 3*	BRI; 3	ROC; 21	TAL; 4	TEX; 35*	CLT; 4*	NSH; 1*	MXC; 34	POC; 10	ATL; 31	CSC; 23	SON; 6	DOV; 4	IND; 36*	IOW; 16	GLN; 6	DAY; 3	PIR; 15	GTW; 28	BRI; 6	KAN; 13*	ROV; 8	LVS; 3	TAL; 3	MAR; 26	PHO; 5*			3rd	4032
2026	Justin Allgaier	7	Chevy	DAY; 2	ATL; 33	COA; 8	PHO; 1	LVS; 4*	DAR; 1	MAR; 1*	CAR; 3	BRI; 4	KAN; 3	TAL; 23	TEX; 2	GLN; 10	DOV; 2*	CLT; 28*	NSH; 1*	POC; 1*	COR; 32	SON; 26	CHI; 6	ATL; 1	IND; 2	IOW; 24*	DAY; 6	DAR; 17*	GTW; 13	BRI; 4	LVS; 34	CLT; 4	PHO; 3	TAL; 4	MAR; 2	HOM; 7			1st	2477

=== Car No. 8 history ===
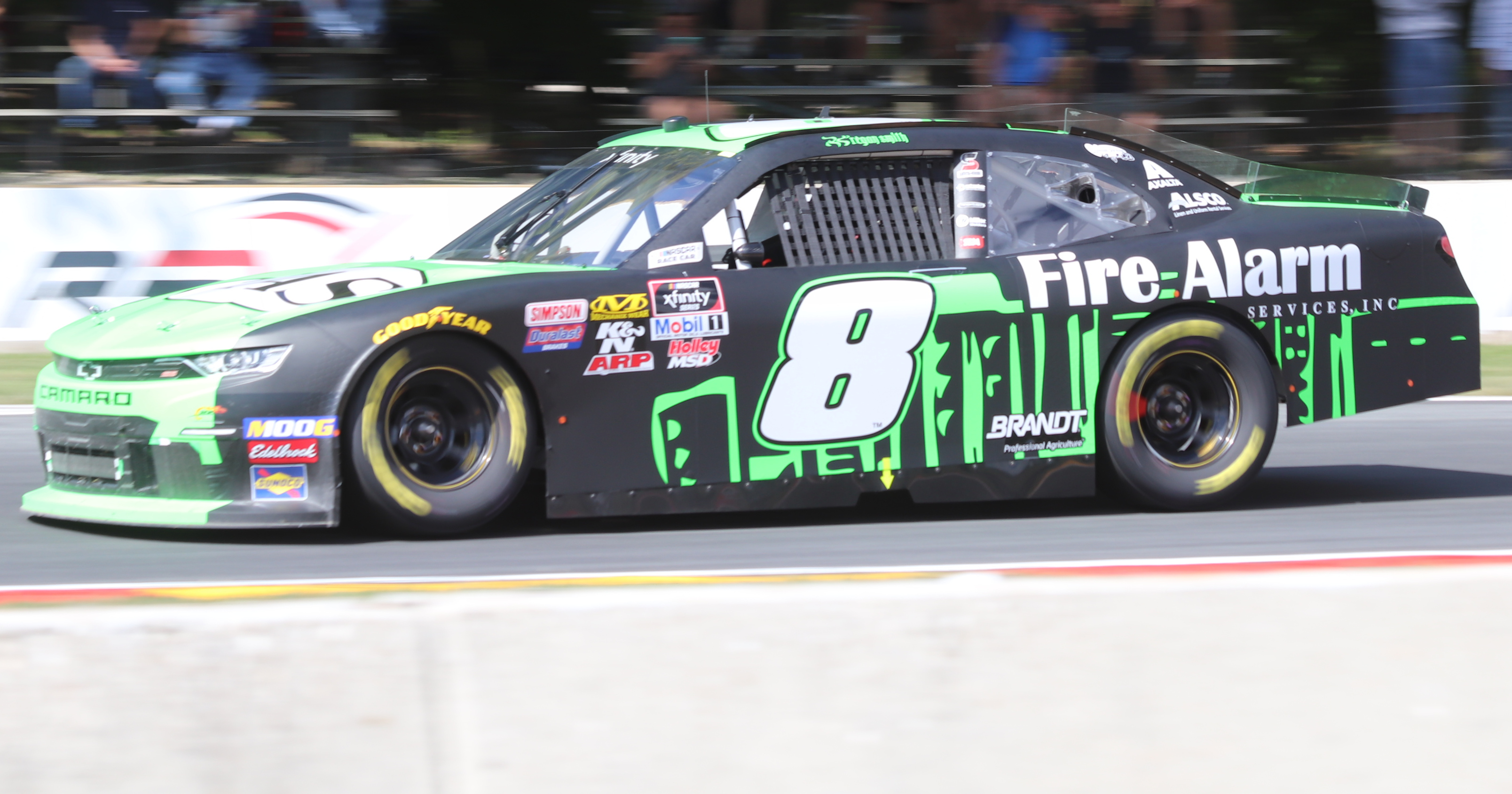
Regan Smith in the No. 8 at Road America in 2019

Multiple drivers (2019–2021)

The No. 8, long driven by Earnhardt Jr. during his early Cup career with Dale Earnhardt, Inc., became a JRM number in 2019 after acquiring it from B. J. McLeod Motorsports. The team inherited the No. 1 car points and it was shared by Zane Smith, Brett Moffitt, Jeb Burton, Ryan Truex, Ryan Preece, Regan Smith, and Sheldon Creed. Elliott and Earnhardt returned to the car for one-off races at Daytona and Darlington, respectively. For 2020, Jeb Burton, Dale Earnhardt Jr., and Daniel Hemric all share the No. 8 for 2020 with Hemric doing a majority of the driving. For 2021, Sam Mayer was scheduled to drive the No. 8 car part-time in the latter portion of 2021. For the first half of the season, Josh Berry is scheduled to drive the No. 8 car for twelve races while Miguel Paludo drive for three road-course races.

Josh Berry (2022–2023)

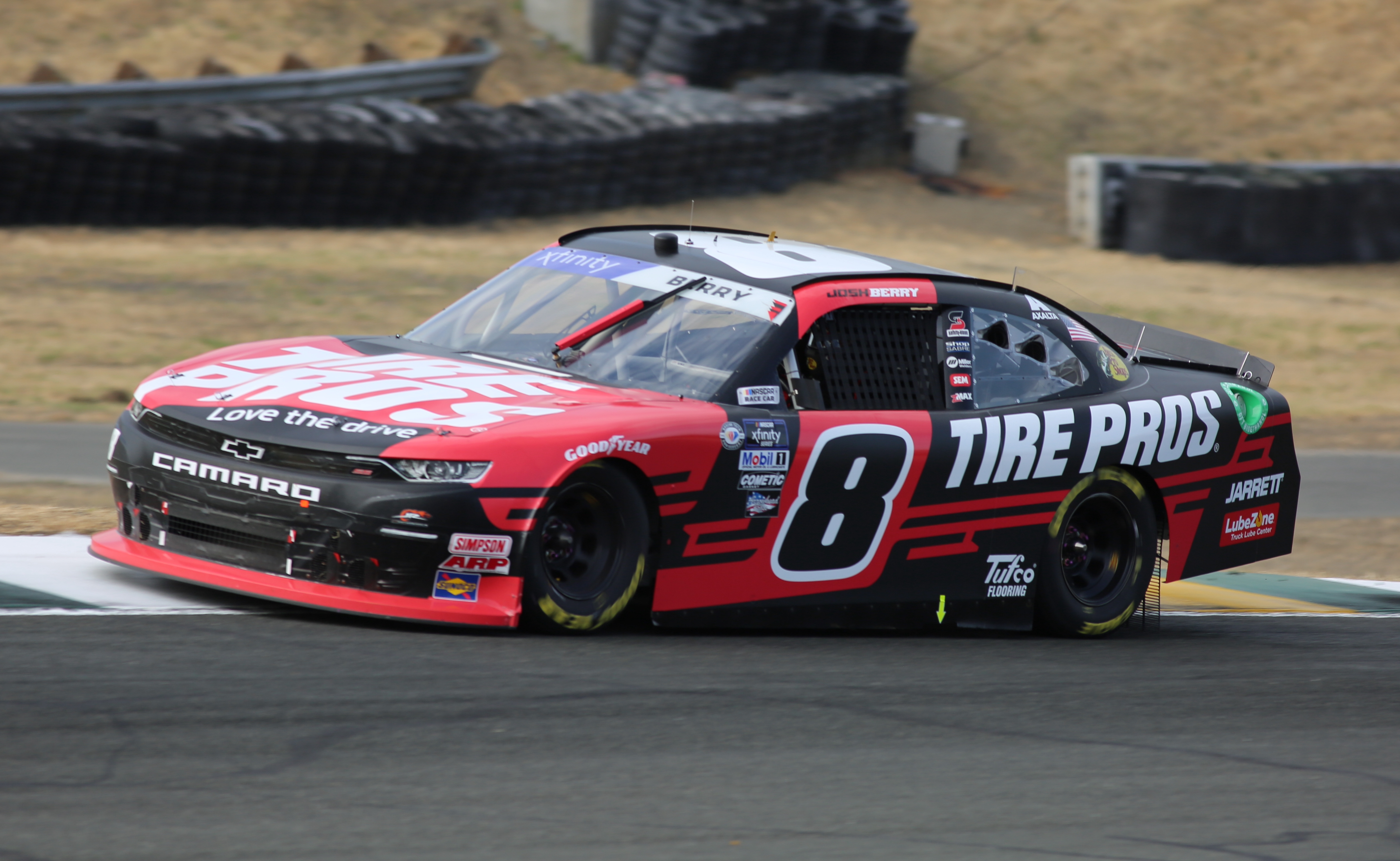
Josh Berry in the No. 8 at Sonoma Raceway in 2023

After driving the No. 8 car for 12 races in 2021, on August 16, 2021, it was announced that Josh Berry will drive the car full-time in 2022. He began the season with a 16th-place finish at Daytona. Berry scored wins at Dover and Charlotte to make the playoffs. During the playoffs, he won at Las Vegas to make the Championship 4.

During the 2023 season, Berry drove winless, but stayed consistent enough to make the playoffs. He was eliminated at the conclusion of the Charlotte Roval race.

Sammy Smith (2024–2026)

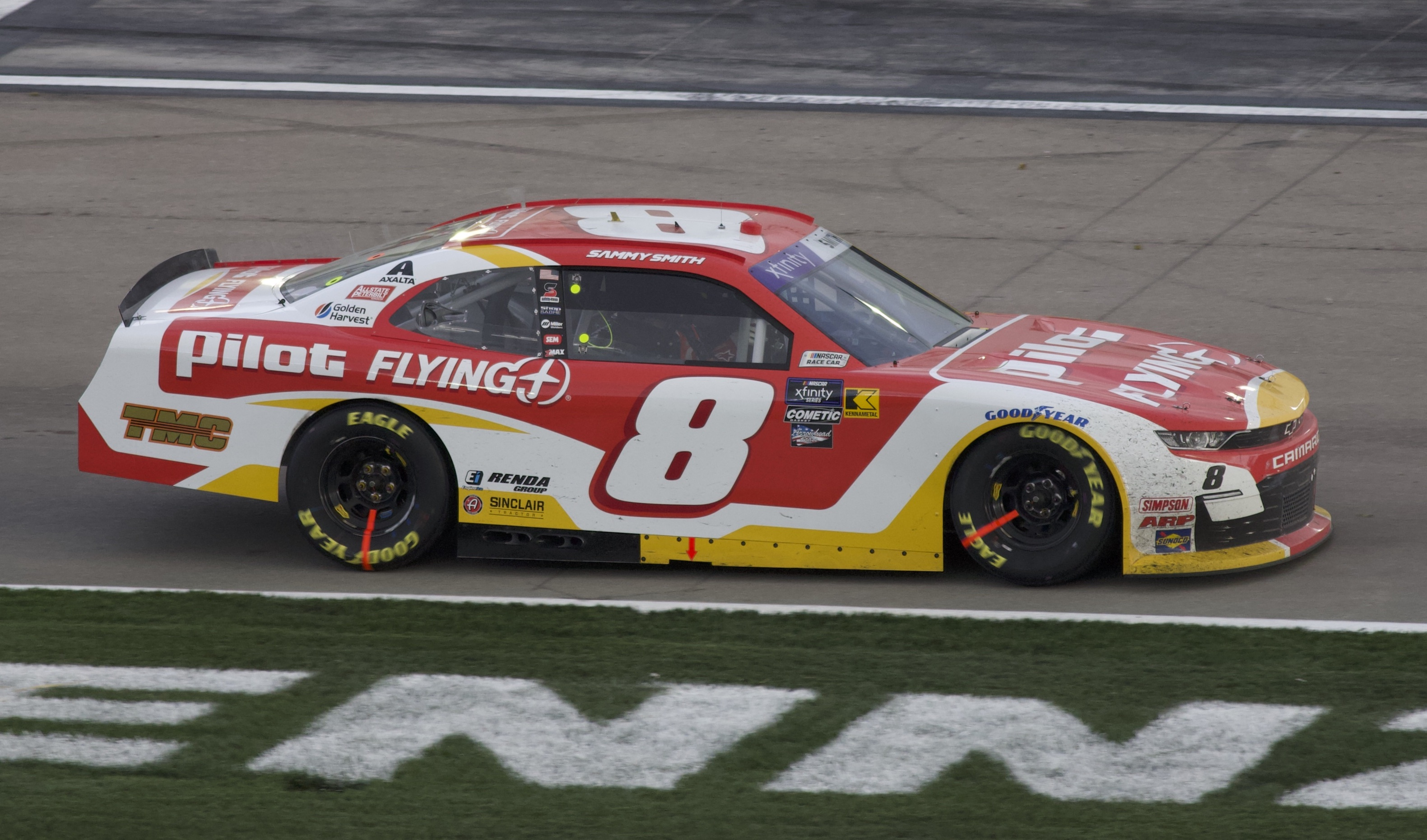
Sammy Smith's No. 8 car at Las Vegas Motor Speedway in 2024

On September 27, 2023, JR Motorsports announced that Sammy Smith will drive the No. 8 for the 2024 season. Smith started the season with a 23rd-place finish at Daytona. He made the playoffs with four top-fives and thirteen top-ten finishes. During the playoffs, Smith scored his second career win at Talladega.

In 2025, JRM reverted the No. 8 back to the former Dale Earnhardt Incorporated font design retaining Sammy Smith as the driver. Smith started the 2025 season with a 24th place finish at Daytona. At Martinsville, he wrecked Taylor Gray while fighting for the lead on the final overtime lap, triggering a multi-car pileup. As a result, Smith was docked 50 driver points and fined US$25,000. At Rockingham, Smith finished second to Jesse Love, but Love was disqualified after failing post race inspection; as a result, Smith earned his first win of the season.

Smith started the 2026 season with a 5th-place finish at Daytona. On August 26, it was announced that Smith would not return to JRM for 2027. Smith got his first win of the season at fall Talladega race.

==== Carson Kvapil (2027) ====
On August 27, it was announced that Carson Kvapil would move from the No. 1 to the No. 8, replacing Sammy Smith for the 2027 season.

==== Car No. 8 results ====
Year	Driver	No.	Make	1	2	3	4	5	6	7	8	9	10	11	12	13	14	15	16	17	18	19	20	21	22	23	24	25	26	27	28	29	30	31	32	33	Owners	Pts
2019	Chase Elliott	8	Chevy	DAY; 10																																	10th	2200
2019	Ryan Preece	8	Chevy		ATL; 7			CAL; 8							POC; 4								GLN; 10														10th	2200
2019	Zane Smith	8	Chevy			LVS; 24				BRI; 11	RCH; 6		DOV; 9				IOW; 5	CHI; 17				IOW; 9								RCH; 8		DOV; 9			PHO; 5		10th	2200
2019	Ryan Truex	8	Chevy				PHO; 2													KEN; 8	NHA; 7								LVS; 14		CLT; 10		KAN; 38				10th	2200
2019	Jeb Burton	8	Chevy						TEX; 5					CLT; 7		MCH; 9									BRI; 32			IND; 4						TEX; 9		HOM; 9	10th	2200
2019	Brett Moffitt	8	Chevy									TAL; 13																									10th	2200
2019	Sheldon Creed	8	Chevy																DAY; 34																		10th	2200
2019	Regan Smith	8	Chevy																					MOH; 21		ROA; 13											10th	2200
2019	Dale Earnhardt Jr.	8	Chevy																								DAR; 5										10th	2200
2020	Jeb Burton	8	Chevy	DAY; 23*										TAL; 3		IND; 31	KEN; 34		TEX; 6				DOV; 7				RCH; 32	RCH; 2	BRI; 9					TEX; 30	MAR; 4		9th	2213
2020	Daniel Hemric	8	Chevy		LVS; 35	CAL; 7	PHO; 30	DAR; 6	CLT; 2	BRI; 6	ATL; 4		HOM; 31		POC; 28			KEN; 9		KAN; 7	ROA; 35	DAY; 37		DOV; 5	DAY; 24	DAR; 37				LVS; 3	TAL; 5	CLT; 3	KAN; 2			PHO; 25	9th	2213
2020	Dale Earnhardt Jr.	8	Chevy									HOM; 5																									9th	2213
2021	Josh Berry	8	Chevy	DAY; 27		HOM; 10	LVS; 7	PHO; 36	ATL; 38	MAR; 1*	TAL; 31	DAR; 2	DOV; 2		CLT; 32		TEX; 19	NSH; 4																			12th	2158
2021	Miguel Paludo	8	Chevy		DAY; 7									COA; 34		MOH; 27																					12th	2158
2021	Sam Mayer	8	Chevy																POC; 18	ROA; 35	ATL; 9	NHA; 39	GLN; 10	IND; 27	MCH; 33	DAY; 12	DAR; 39		BRI; 9	LVS; 34	TAL; 38	CLT; 10	TEX; 13	KAN; 8	MAR; 4	PHO; 13	12th	2158
2021	Dale Earnhardt Jr.	8	Chevy																									RCH; 14									12th	2158
2022	Josh Berry	8	Chevy	DAY; 16	CAL; 4	LVS; 4	PHO; 3	ATL; 33	COA; 27	RCH; 7	MAR; 19	TAL; 11	DOV; 1	DAR; 18	TEX; 7*	CLT; 1*	PIR; 4	NSH; 35	ROA; 3	ATL; 2	NHA; 31	POC; 3	IND; 14	MCH; 6	GLN; 9	DAY; 18	DAR; 8	KAN; 7	BRI; 7	TEX; 6	TAL; 5	CLT; 8	LVS; 1	HOM; 11	MAR; 20	PHO; 13	4th	4024
2023	Josh Berry	8	Chevy	DAY; 26	CAL; 5	LVS; 5	PHO; 8	ATL; 7	COA; 8	RCH; 3	MAR; 4	TAL; 30	DOV; 2	DAR; 7	CLT; 15	PIR; 4	SON; 33	NSH; 5	CSC; 24	ATL; 19	NHA; 17	POC; 24*	ROA; 6	MCH; 2	IRC; 14	GLN; 20	DAY; 17	DAR; 5	KAN; 6	BRI; 36	TEX; 27	ROV; 3	LVS; 12	HOM; 32	MAR; 5	PHO; 6	11th	2171
2024	Sammy Smith	8	Chevy	DAY; 23	ATL; 10	LVS; 8	PHO; 9	COA; 36	RCH; 9	MAR; 7	TEX; 8	TAL; 21	DOV; 33	DAR; 34	CLT; 3	PIR; 3	SON; 33	IOW; 4	NHA; 12	NSH; 30	CSC; 13	POC; 9	IND; 18	MCH; 5	DAY; 23	DAR; 5	ATL; 7	GLN; 19	BRI; 15	KAN; 22	TAL; 1	ROV; 10	LVS; 32	HOM; 22	MAR; 2	PHO; 15	13th	863
2025	Sammy Smith	8	Chevy	DAY; 24	ATL; 4	COA; 11	PHO; 14	LVS; 14	HOM; 21	MAR; 10	DAR; 9	BRI; 4	CAR; 1	TAL; 31	TEX; 18	CLT; 38	NSH; 10	MXC; 10	POC; 8	ATL; 33	CSC; 7	SON; 9	DOV; 24	IND; 7	IOW; 15	GLN; 3	DAY; 2	PIR; 22	GTW; 33	BRI; 37	KAN; 4	ROV; 3	LVS; 20	TAL; 9	MAR; 2	PHO; 6	9th	2224
2026	Sammy Smith	8	Chevy	DAY; 5	ATL; 30	COA; 3	PHO; 6	LVS; 5	DAR; 9	MAR; 3	CAR; 12	BRI; 13	KAN; 16	TAL; 4	TEX; 13	GLN; 16	DOV; 9	CLT; 11	NSH; 10	POC; 19	COR; 5	SON; 11	CHI; 13	ATL; 18*	IND; 19	IOW; 17	DAY; 36	DAR; 4	GTW; 8	BRI; 10	LVS; 15	CLT; 16	PHO; 3	TAL; 1	MAR; 7	HOM; 15	7th	2342

=== Car No. 9 history ===
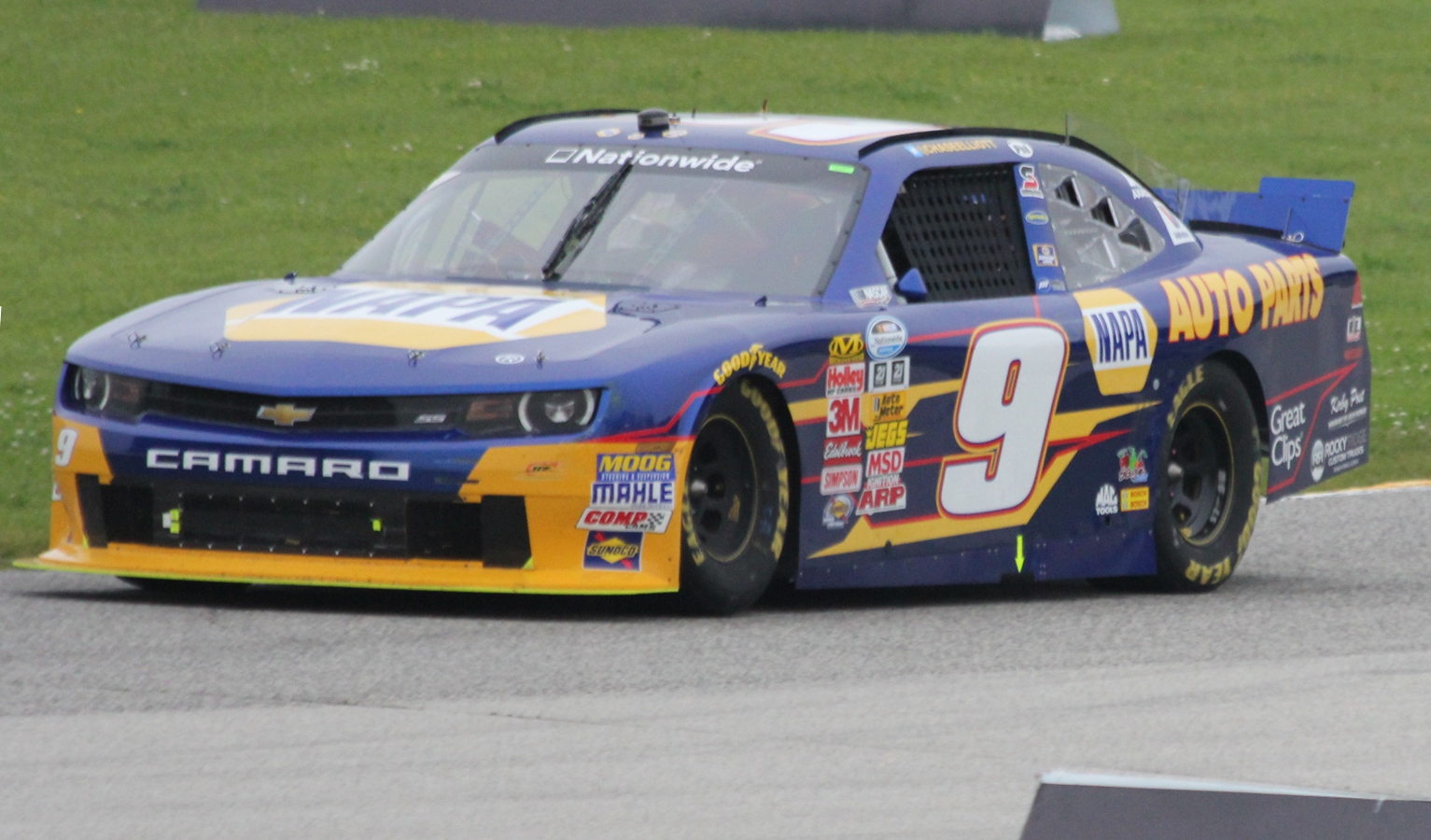
Chase Elliott at Road America in 2014

Chase Elliott (2014–2015)

The No. 9 car made its debut in 2014, when an eighteen-year-old Hendrick development driver named Chase Elliott was signed to drive a fourth entry for JR Motorsports. The car was renumbered to 9, the longtime number of Chase's father Bill Elliott. In a surprise move, NAPA Auto Parts, which recently left Michael Waltrip Racing and was rumored to depart from the sport, signed on to sponsor the full season. After the Boyd Gaming 300 at Las Vegas Motor Speedway, the team was revealed to have violated Sections 12–4.2 (P2 penalty) and 20A–12.8.1B (car exceeded minimum front height) of the NASCAR rulebook. As a result, crew chief Greg Ives was placed on probation until December 31. At the O'Reilly Auto Parts 300, Elliott passed teammate Kevin Harvick for his first Nationwide Series win. Elliott's second win came in the VFW Sport Clips Help a Hero 200 at Darlington Raceway, where he led 52 laps. A late race caution and a slow pit stop would find Elliott restarting in 6th with just 2 laps to go. Elliott managed an outstanding feat of passing the 5 cars in front of him en route to his second win of the season. Elliott would win his third race of the season in the EnjoyIllinois.com 300 at Chicagoland Speedway after holding off Trevor Bayne. Elliott won the 2014 Nationwide Series championship, the first rookie to win a NASCAR national series championship.

In 2015, Elliott returned to the No. 9 full-time to defend his championship, but only won one race at Richmond and finished second in the final standings. Elliott's 2014 crew chief Greg Ives would move up to Dale Earnhardt Jr.'s Cup Series team, replaced by longtime Xfinity crew chief Ernie Cope. The No. 9 team did not race in 2016.

William Byron (2017)

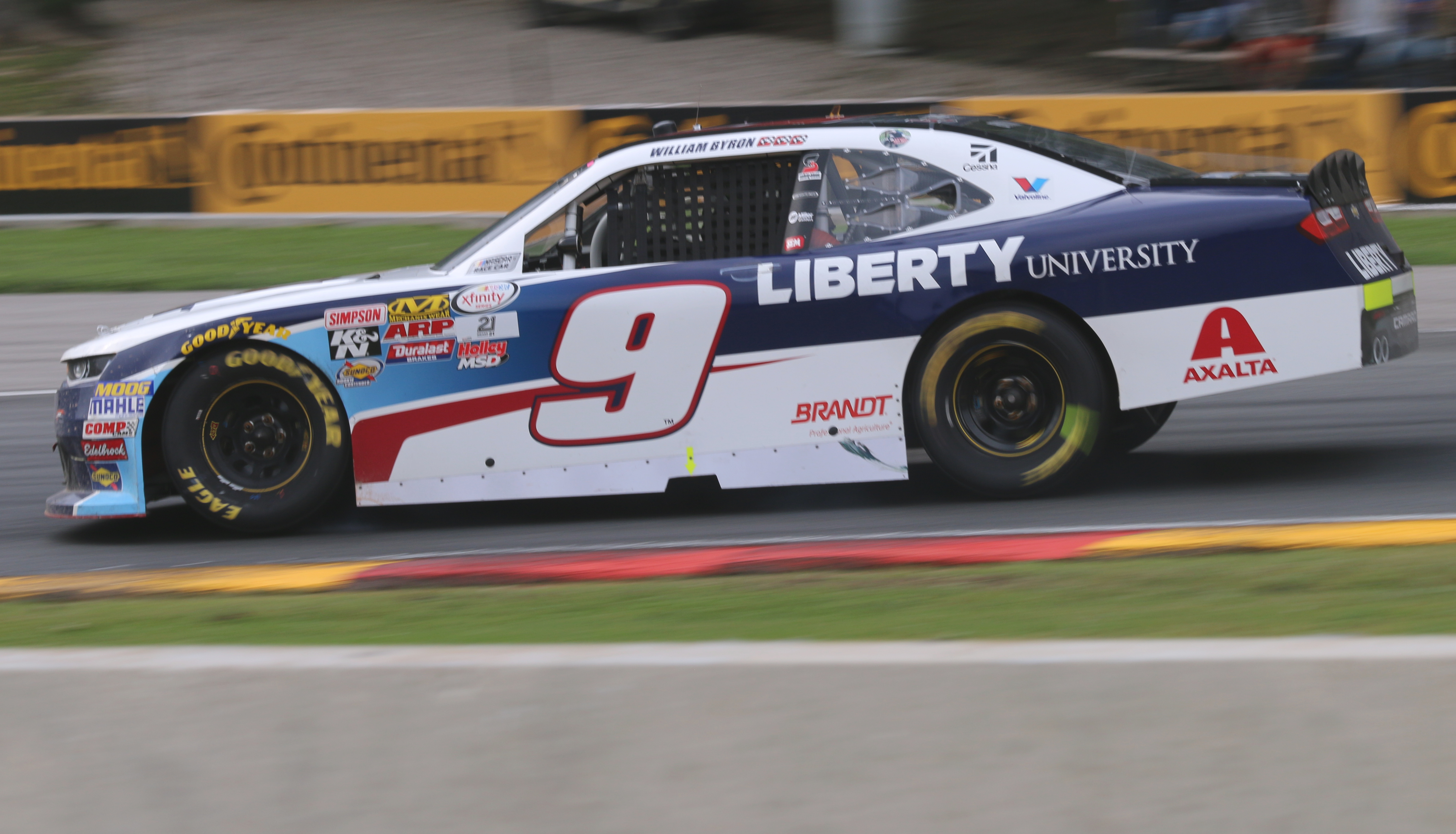
Byron's No. 9 at Road America in 2017

On August 18, 2016, William Byron and Hendrick Motorsports announced a multi-year driver development agreement, with Byron running full-time in the Xfinity Series driving the No. 9 Liberty University Chevrolet Camaro for JR Motorsports in 2017. It was the first time since 2014 that the No. 9 was driven by a rookie driver. At the 2017 Ford Eco Boost 300, as William Byron and Elliott Sadler were battling late, Byron took advantage of Sadler's mistake of trying to pass Ryan Preece when he was too far back, slowing Sadler and allowing Byron to pass both drivers. When Sadler tried to follow, he made contact with Preece, sending Preece sideways and Sadler into the wall. After that Byron pulled away and finished 3rd, ultimately winning the championship and Rookie of the Year honors while winning four races at Iowa, Daytona, Indianapolis, and Phoenix.

Tyler Reddick (2018)

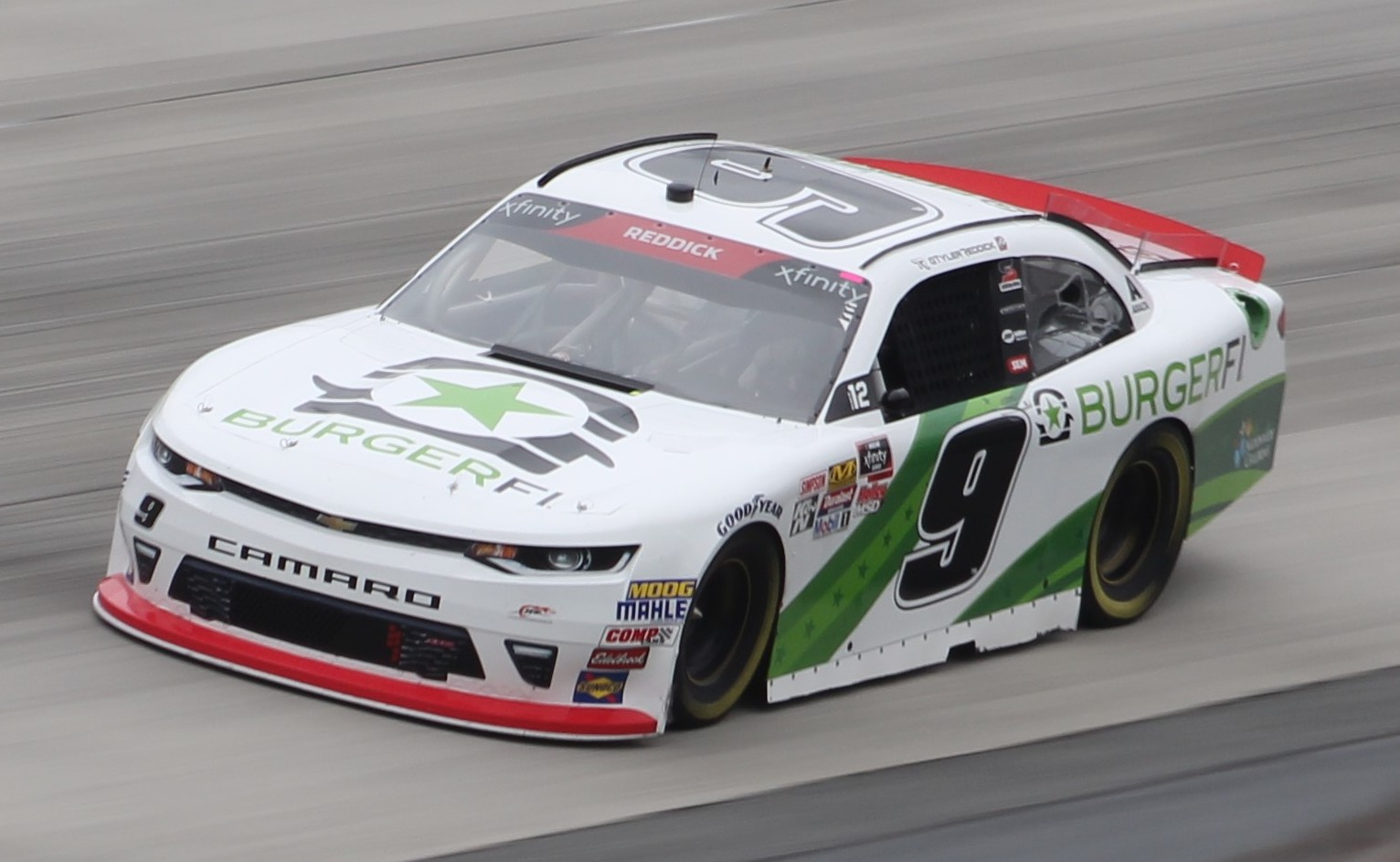
Tyler Reddick's 2018 championship car

Tyler Reddick was signed to a full-time schedule for the 2018 Xfinity season, replacing William Byron, who was promoted to the Monster Energy NASCAR Cup Series. On February 17, 2018, Reddick beat teammate Elliott Sadler in a photo finish to win the season-opening race at Daytona. At a margin of .0004 seconds, it is the closest finish in NASCAR history. At the Ford EcoBoost 300, Reddick took advantage of pitting while leader Cole Custer stayed longer than him and won the race while also winning the championship, joining Chase Elliott and William Byron as the third different driver to win the championship and Rookie of the Year honors in the No. 9. Despite winning the championship, Reddick opted to leave JRM for Richard Childress Racing in 2019, winning his second Xfinity championship that year before jumping to the Cup Series in 2020.

Noah Gragson (2019–2022)

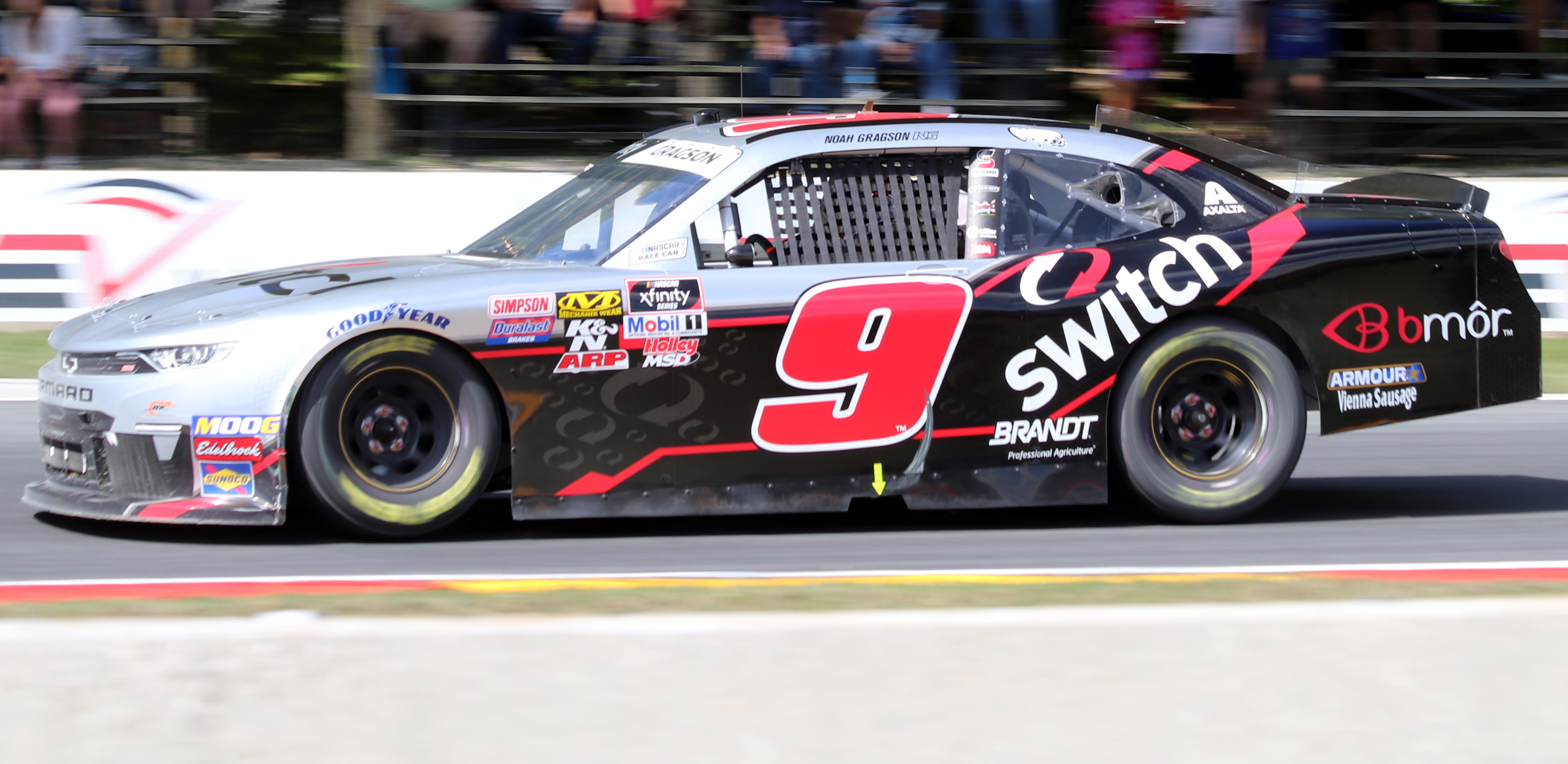
Noah Gragson at Road America in 2019

On December 18, 2018, it was announced that the No. 9 car would be driven by Zane Smith for eight races while other drivers fill out the other 25 races; however, on January 25, 2019, it was announced that Noah Gragson would drive the No. 9 car full-time while Smith will run 8 races in the new No. 8 entry. In his first year with JRM, Gragson scored no wins, but had six top-fives and 22 top-tens while finishing eighth in the points standings.

Gragson began the 2020 season with his first career win at Daytona. He also scored his second victory at Bristol. In addition, Gragson recorded seventeen top-fives and 25 top-tens, finishing fifth in the points standings.

The 2021 season for Gragson began with a 32nd-place finish at Daytona. His run that season was marred by six DNFs, but back-to-back wins at Darlington and Richmond put him in the playoffs for the third season in a row. Gragson won again at Martinsville and finished the season third in the standings.

Gragson began the 2022 season with a third-place finish at Daytona. He also scored wins at Phoenix, Talladega, and Pocono. At Road America, Gragson had an on-road scuffle with Sage Karam, resulting in him triggering a 13-car pileup on lap 25. He was fined US$35,000 and docked 30 driver and owner points for the incident. On August 10, 2022, it was announced that Gragson would leave JRM to go drive the Petty GMS Motorsports No. 42 in the NASCAR Cup Series. At the September Darlington race, Gragson won a three-car battle with Sheldon Creed and Kyle Larson on the closing laps. He also won the next three races at Kansas, Bristol, and Texas, becoming the first driver since Sam Ard in 1983 to win four straight Xfinity Series races. Gragson won at Homestead to make his second Championship 4 appearance.

Brandon Jones (2023–2024)

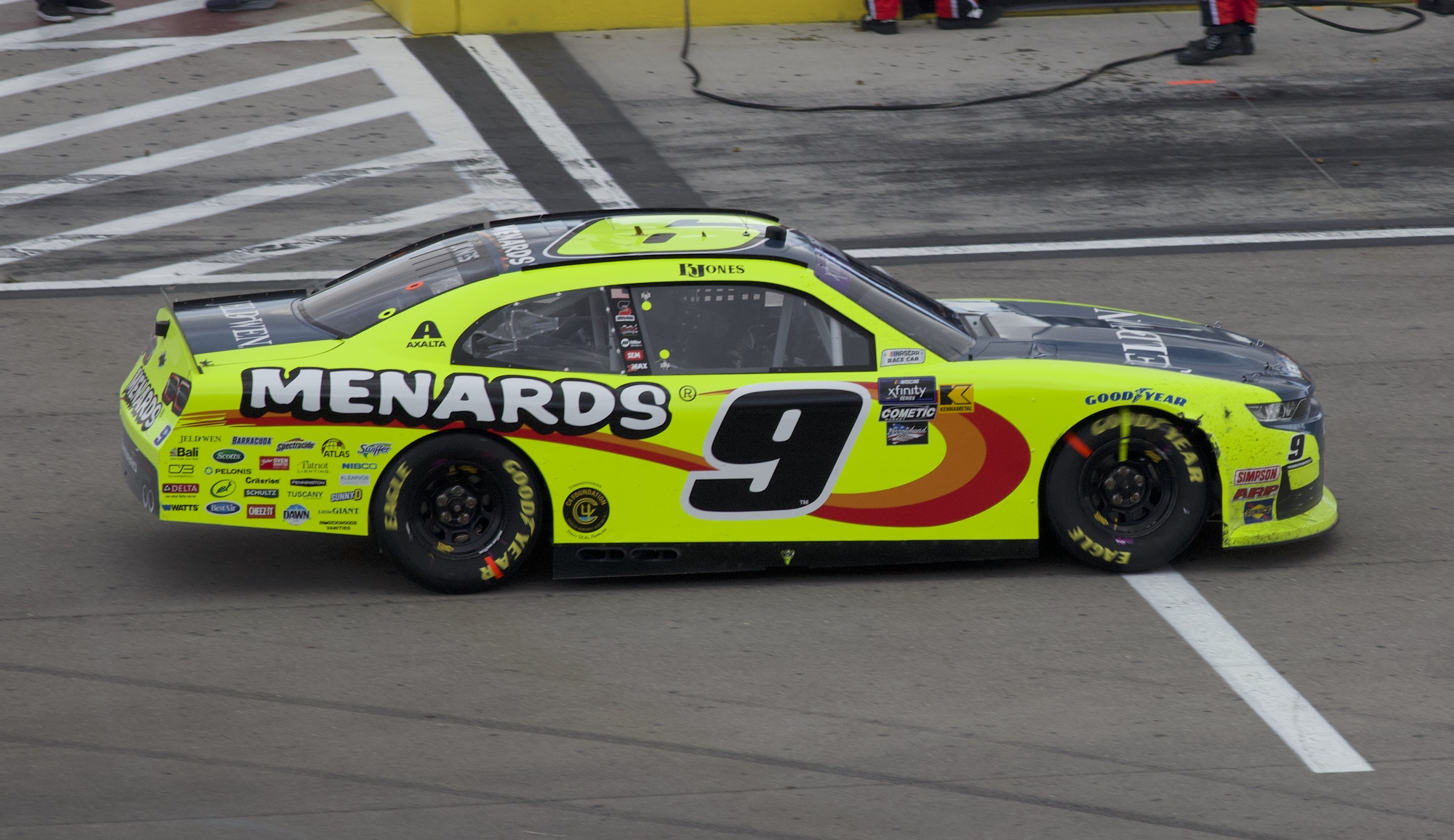
Brandon Jones' No. 9 car at Las Vegas Motor Speedway in 2024

On September 14, 2022, it was announced that Brandon Jones would depart Joe Gibbs Racing and replace Gragson in the No. 9 for 2023. Jones' sponsor Menards confirmed they would follow him for the full 2023 season. He ended the season with three top fives during the season. This included a runner-up finish at the Kansas cutoff race, where a dominating performance by John Hunter Nemechek prevented Jones from qualifying for the Playoffs with a win.

Jones remained in the No. 9 car during 2024 but did not improve his results; despite taking three pole positions across the year he only claimed a single top five result at Charlotte, where he pressured Chase Elliott for the win, and retired from a total of ten races — twice due to engine issues, eight times due to crashes. On September 3, 2024, it was announced that Jones would depart from JRM and return to JGR for 2025.

Part-time (2025–present)

For the 2025 season, the No. 9 car was run on a part-time basis with Ross Chastain, Daniel Suárez, Shane van Gisbergen, and Connor Mosack. Chastain finished eighth at COTA, fourth at Darlingon, and fifth at Nashville. Suárez took the No. 9 car to victory lane at Mexico. Van Gisbergen followed it up with a win at the Chicago street course.

In 2026, van Gisbergen and Chastain would return to drive the No. 9 car in select races. In his first start of the season, van Gisbergen would earn victory at Austin. He would score another victory at Sonoma. Chastain won at Charlotte after rain ended the race following the second stage. Carson Kvapil would compete in five NASCAR O'Reilly Auto Parts Series races in the No. 9 to fill out his 2026 full time schedule. Lee Pulliam would make his NASCAR O'Reilly Auto Parts Series in the No. 9 car at Martinsville. Jake Finch would compete in five NASCAR O'Reilly Auto Parts Series races in the No. 9 car.

==== Car No. 9 results ====
Year	Driver	No.	Make	1	2	3	4	5	6	7	8	9	10	11	12	13	14	15	16	17	18	19	20	21	22	23	24	25	26	27	28	29	30	31	32	33	Owners	Pts
2014	Chase Elliott	9	Chevy	DAY; 15	PHO; 9	LVS; 5	BRI; 9	CAL; 6	TEX; 1	DAR; 1	RCH; 2	TAL; 19	IOW; 4	CLT; 37	DOV; 5	MCH; 6	ROA; 4	KEN; 12	DAY; 20	NHA; 8	CHI; 1*	IND; 12	IOW; 8	GLN; 6	MOH; 4	BRI; 3	ATL; 5	RCH; 2	CHI; 10	KEN; 4	DOV; 3	KAN; 10	CLT; 8*	TEX; 4	PHO; 5	HOM; 17	1st	1213
2015	Chase Elliott	9	Chevy	DAY; 28	ATL; 5	LVS; 5	PHO; 7	CAL; 4	TEX; 8	BRI; 6	RCH; 5	TAL; 37	IOW; 2*	CLT; 8	DOV; 6	MCH; 2	CHI; 14	DAY; 3	KEN; 13	NHA; 9	IND; 10	IOW; 9	GLN; 7	MOH; 5	BRI; 7	ROA; 4*	DAR; 24	RCH; 1*	CHI; 14	KEN; 4	DOV; 7	CLT; 9	KAN; 7	TEX; 8	PHO; 7	HOM; 8	6th	1175
2017	William Byron	9	Chevy	DAY; 9	ATL; 7	LVS; 14	PHO; 4	CAL; 5	TEX; 7	BRI; 12	RCH; 30	TAL; 36	CLT; 14	DOV; 6	POC; 12	MCH; 2	IOW; 1	DAY; 1*	KEN; 7	NHA; 3	IND; 1	IOW; 9	GLN; 10	MOH; 25	BRI; 22	ROA; 6	DAR; 5	RCH; 7	CHI; 33	KEN; 18	DOV; 3	CLT; 16	KAN; 4	TEX; 9	PHO; 1	HOM; 3	1st	4034
2018	Tyler Reddick	9	Chevy	DAY; 1	ATL; 19	LVS; 8	PHO; 10	CAL; 7	TEX; 23	BRI; 7	RCH; 11	TAL; 8	DOV; 5	CLT; 23	POC; 9	MCH; 7	IOW; 8	CHI; 33	DAY; 31	KEN; 6	NHA; 25	IOW; 22	GLN; 11	MOH; 31	BRI; 9	ROA; 34	DAR; 3	IND; 2	LVS; 28	RCH; 7	CLT; 9	DOV; 14	KAN; 5	TEX; 2*	PHO; 6	HOM; 1	1st	4040
2019	Noah Gragson	9	Chevy	DAY; 11	ATL; 9	LVS; 3	PHO; 11	CAL; 12	TEX; 13	BRI; 9	RCH; 22	TAL; 11	DOV; 19	CLT; 4	POC; 6	MCH; 2	IOW; 6	CHI; 6	DAY; 15	KEN; 6	NHA; 10	IOW; 4	GLN; 9	MOH; 5	BRI; 17	ROA; 4	DAR; 8	IND; 3	LVS; 6	RCH; 7	CLT; 5	DOV; 7	KAN; 13	TEX; 30	PHO; 10	HOM; 4	7th	2246
2020	Noah Gragson	9	Chevy	DAY; 1	LVS; 4	CAL; 26	PHO; 7	DAR; 5*	CLT; 11	BRI; 1	ATL; 2	HOM; 3*	HOM; 5*	TAL; 10	POC; 22	IND; 3	KEN; 11*	KEN; 7	TEX; 30	KAN; 15	ROA; 6	DAY; 3	DOV; 4	DOV; 6	DAY; 31	DAR; 7	RCH; 8	RCH; 5	BRI; 7	LVS; 2	TAL; 3	CLT; 2	KAN; 36	TEX; 2*	MAR; 3	PHO; 2	5th	2306
2021	Noah Gragson	9	Chevy	DAY; 32	DAY; 28	HOM; 33	LVS; 5	PHO; 39	ATL; 4	MAR; 2	TAL; 6	DAR; 4*	DOV; 15	COA; 36	CLT; 27	MOH; 40	TEX; 7	NSH; 8	POC; 4	ROA; 9	ATL; 3	NHA; 14	GLN; 7	IND; 5	MCH; 3	DAY; 7	DAR; 1	RCH; 1	BRI; 12	LVS; 3	TAL; 30	CLT; 6	TEX; 3	KAN; 35	MAR; 1	PHO; 12	3rd	4025
2022	Noah Gragson	9	Chevy	DAY; 3	CAL; 2	LVS; 2	PHO; 1*	ATL; 26	COA; 4	RCH; 21	MAR; 20	TAL; 1	DOV; 4	DAR; 2	TEX; 36	CLT; 4	PIR; 9	NSH; 13	ROA; 8	ATL; 6	NHA; 38	POC; 1*	IND; 10	MCH; 3	GLN; 4	DAY; 22	DAR; 1*	KAN; 1*	BRI; 1	TEX; 1	TAL; 10	CLT; 3	LVS; 3	HOM; 1*	MAR; 4	PHO; 2	2nd	4035
2023	Brandon Jones	9	Chevy	DAY; 14	CAL; 33	LVS; 21	PHO; 23	ATL; 19	COA; 11	RCH; 21	MAR; 5	TAL; 14	DOV; 8	DAR; 34	CLT; 9	PIR; 13	SON; 21	NSH; 24	CSC; 29	ATL; 33	NHA; 11	POC; 7	ROA; 10	MCH; 3	IRC; 21	GLN; 11	DAY; 36	DAR; 14	KAN; 2	BRI; 34	TEX; 9	ROV; 29	LVS; 8	HOM; 8	MAR; 16	PHO; 11	16th	793
2024	Brandon Jones	9	Chevy	DAY; 9	ATL; 14	LVS; 9	PHO; 7	COA; 16	RCH; 37	MAR; 27	TEX; 13	TAL; 33	DOV; 19	DAR; 10	CLT; 2	PIR; 36	SON; 38	IOW; 36	NHA; 14	NSH; 13	CSC; 17	POC; 13	IND; 15	MCH; 36	DAY; 22	DAR; 32	ATL; 9	GLN; 28	BRI; 6	KAN; 6	TAL; 28	ROV; 11	LVS; 17	HOM; 17	MAR; 29	PHO; 18	16th	696
2025	Ross Chastain	9	Chevy	DAY	ATL	COA; 8	PHO	LVS	HOM	MAR	DAR; 4	BRI	ROC	TAL	TEX	CLT	NSH; 5						DOV; 38	IND	IOW; 3*												34th	319
2025	Daniel Suárez	9	Chevy															MXC; 1*	POC	ATL																	34th	319
2025	Shane van Gisbergen	9	Chevy																		CSC; 1*	SON; 2				GLN; 31	DAY	PIR	GTW	BRI	KAN						34th	319
2025	Connor Mosack	9	Chevy																													ROV; 5	LVS	TAL	MAR	PHO	34th	319
2026	Shane van Gisbergen	9	Chevy	DAY	ATL	COA; 1	PHO									GLN; 8						SON; 1*															17th	630
2026	Carson Kvapil	9	Chevy					LVS; 11				BRI; 5	KAN	TAL	TEX; 11					POC; 10	COR		CHI; 11														17th	630
2026	Ross Chastain	9	Chevy						DAR; 14								DOV; 13	CLT; 1	NSH						IND; 3*	IOW; 4	DAY										17th	630
2026	Lee Pulliam	9	Chevy							MAR; 5	CAR																										17th	630
2026	Jake Finch	9	Chevy																					ATL; 30				DAR; 18	GTW	BRI; 11	LVS	CLT; 31	PHO; 38	TAL; 38	MAR	HOM	17th	630

=== Car No. 83 history ===
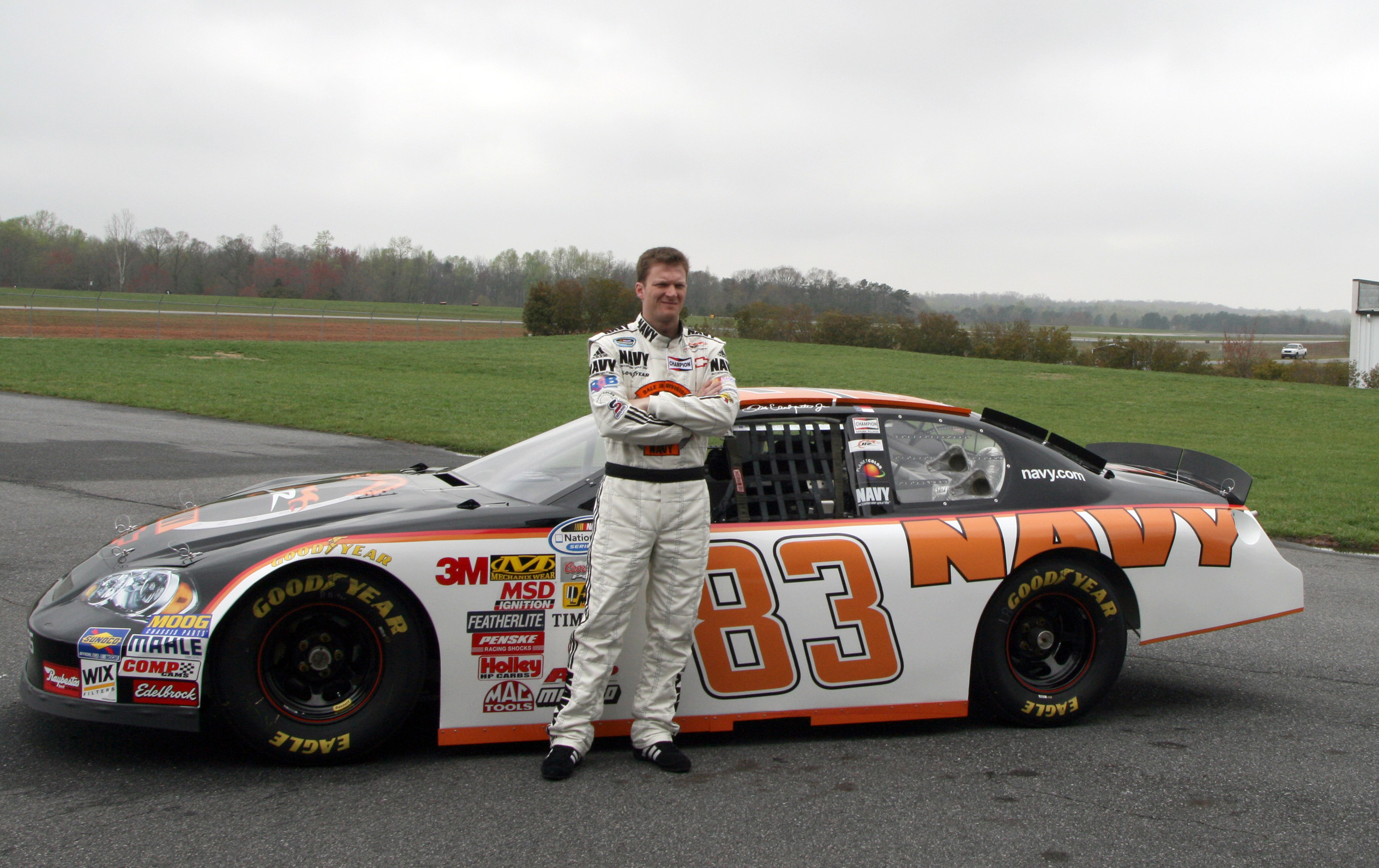
Dale Earnhardt Jr. and the No. 83 Navy Chevrolet in 2008

Part-time (2006, 2008)

In 2006, the team fielded the No. 83 team as a part-time second car. The car was driven by Shane Huffman with sponsorship from the Make a Wish Foundation. The car returned in 2008 driven by Dale Earnhardt Jr. with the US Navy sponsoring. In 2010, JR Motorsports and Richard Childress Racing announced that the number would switch from No. 83 to No. 3 with Dale Earnhardt Jr. driving the car at Daytona in July with Wrangler sponsoring the car. This was a tribute to Dale Earnhardt, being inducted into the NASCAR Hall of Fame in May. Earnhardt Jr. won the race in the No. 3 car.

==== Car No. 83 results ====
Year	Driver	No.	Make	1	2	3	4	5	6	7	8	9	10	11	12	13	14	15	16	17	18	19	20	21	22	23	24	25	26	27	28	29	30	31	32	33	34	35	Owners	Pts
2006	Shane Huffman	83	Chevy	DAY	CAL	MXC	LVS	ATL	BRI	TEX	NSH	PHO	TAL	RCH	DAR	CLT	DOV	NSH	KEN	MLW	DAY	CHI	NHA	MAR	GTY; 27	IRP	GLN	MCH	BRI	CAL	RCH	DOV	KAN	CLT	MEM	TEX	PHO	HOM		
2008	Dale Earnhardt Jr.	83	Chevy	DAY	CAL	LVS	ATL	BRI	NSH	TEX	PHO	MXC	TAL	RCH	DAR	CLT; 4	DOV	NSH	KEN	MLW	NHA	DAY	CHI	GTY	IRP	CGV	GLN	MCH	BRI	CAL	RCH	DOV	KAN	CLT	MEM	TEX	PHO	HOM		

=== Car No. 88 history ===
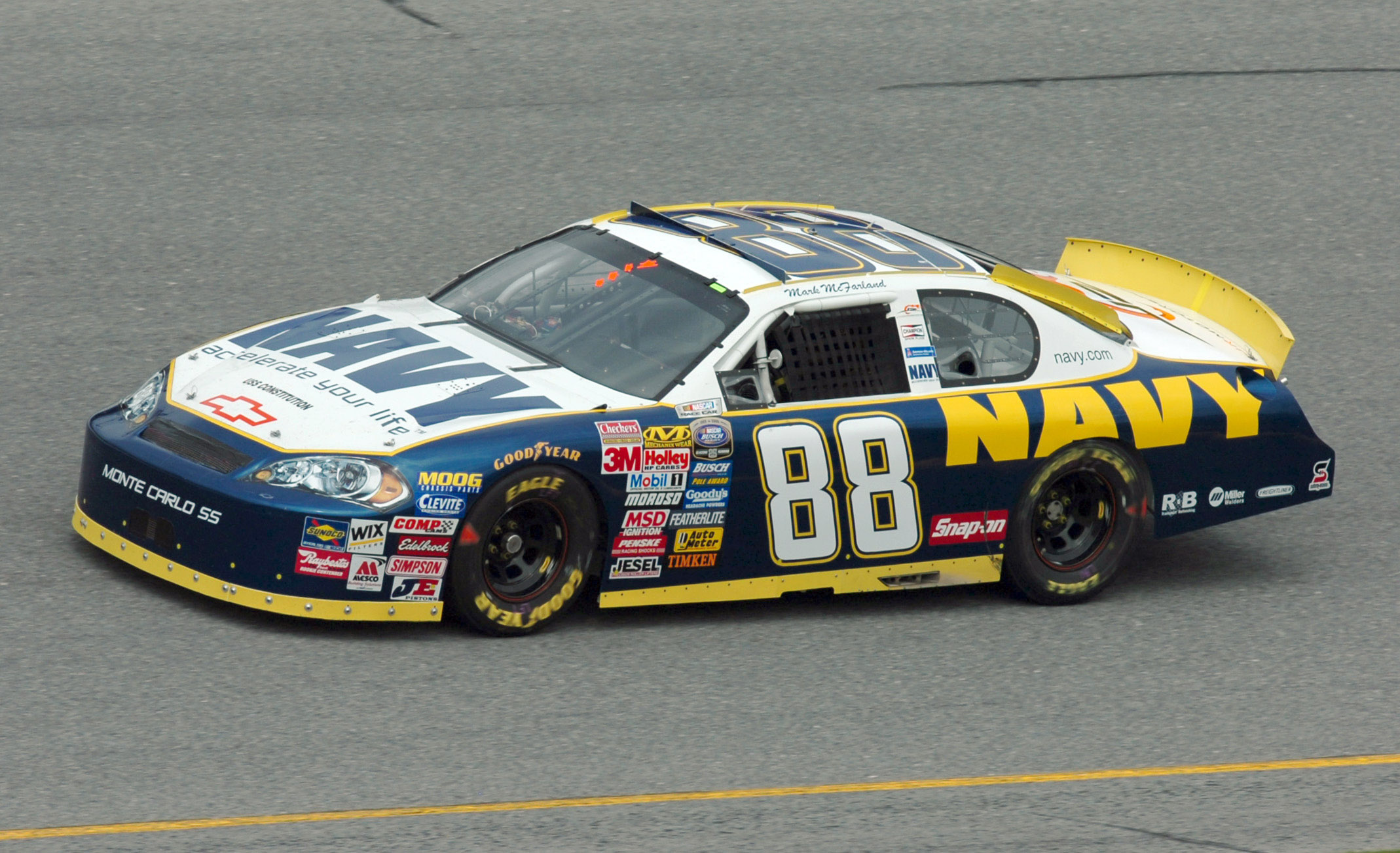
Mark McFarland, the team's first driver, in 2006

Multiple drivers (2005–2007)

The No. 88 debuted in 2005 at the Ford 300 with Mark McFarland driving with sponsorship from the United States Navy, qualifying eighteenth and finishing twentieth. McFarland was named the full-time driver and had a seventh-place finish at Talladega Superspeedway, but was replaced by Shane Huffman after twenty-one races, with Martin Truex Jr. and Robby Gordon filling-in for certain races. Huffman was hired as the full-time driver in 2007, and had two top-ten finishes before he was released from the ride as well.

Brad Keselowski (2007–2009)

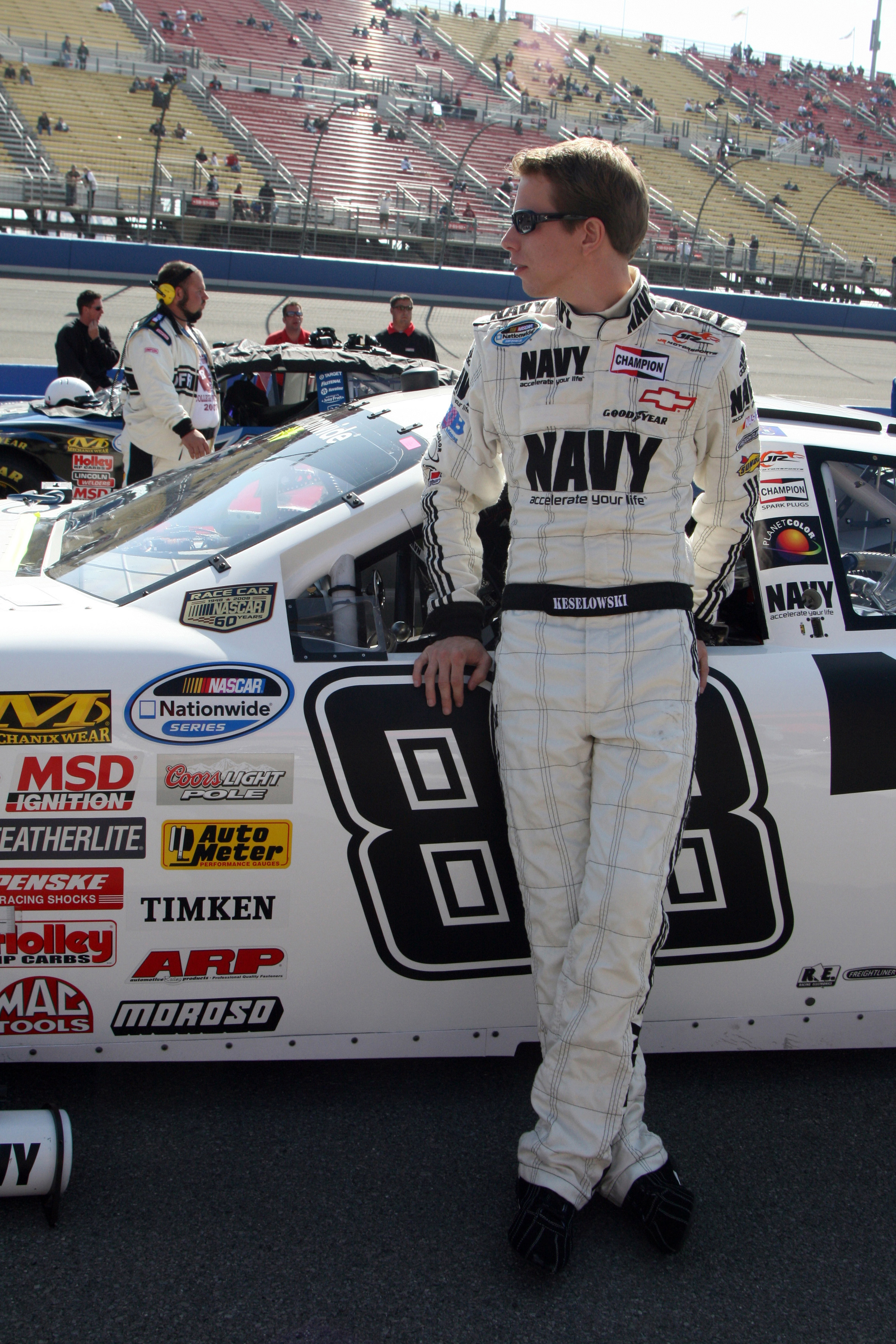
Brad Keselowski earned six victories for the team from 2007 to 2009.

Brad Keselowski, son of former Craftsman Truck Series driver Bob Keselowski, was hired to replace Huffman for three races, with SCCA driver Andy Pilgrim to be in the car for the road course races in Montreal and Watkins Glen. Keselowski then returned at his hometown track Michigan. He was involved in a hard crash at Fontana, in which he was tagged by a spinning car, collided head first and then driver side with the first turn wall, temporarily was airborne, and then rode the guardrail while his car was on fire before coming to a stop. Keselowski was taken to a local hospital, and was later cleared to race at Richmond the next week. Keselowski finished the season with five top-ten finishes Keselowski signed a two-year contract with JR Motorsports with the Navy returning as sponsor in 2008. He won his first race at Nashville Superspeedway and later picked up another win at Bristol Motor Speedway, finishing third in points but lost the Navy sponsorship for 2009. GoDaddy.com and Delphi Corporation sponsored the No. 88 for a total of 24 races in 2009, with Unilever brands sponsoring 11 races on the No. 88 car. Keselowski won four races and finished third in points for the second consecutive season before leaving for Penske Racing.

Multiple drivers (2010)

At the end of the 2009 season, Kelly Bires signed a two-year contract to drive for JR Motorsports in the No. 88 Chevy through 2011, with Earnhardt eager to see what Bires could do in his equipment. Bires drove the No. 5 Ragu Chevy for Junior at Homestead in preparation for running full-time in 2010. Due to sponsorship obligations with Unilever and their Hellmann's Mayonnaise brand, owner Dale Earnhardt Jr. ran the No. 88 car at the 2010 season opener at Daytona and Danica Patrick ran the No. 7 car with her sponsor GoDaddy.com, forcing Bires to sit out. In his debut at Fontana, Bires scored a seventh-place finish. Even more curious than his missing Daytona was when Bires was removed from the No. 88 car in favor of Cup driver Jamie McMurray after only five races run, with only one finish below 17th (a crash at Las Vegas). Earnhardt Jr. cited chemistry issues between Bires, JR Motorsports management, and the team including Tony Eury Sr. and Jr., and implied that Bires was taking a seat from "the next Brad Keselowski, the next Jeff Gordon." Bires was the third young driver to be hastily removed from the 88 car. Elliott Sadler, Greg Sacks, Aric Almirola, Steve Arpin, Coleman Pressley, Dale Earnhardt Jr. and Ron Fellows all ran races in the car to finish out the season. The No. 88 team took home one win in 2010, with McMurray victorious in the Great Clips 300 at Atlanta. They also came close to winning the inaugural race at Road America with Ron Fellows.

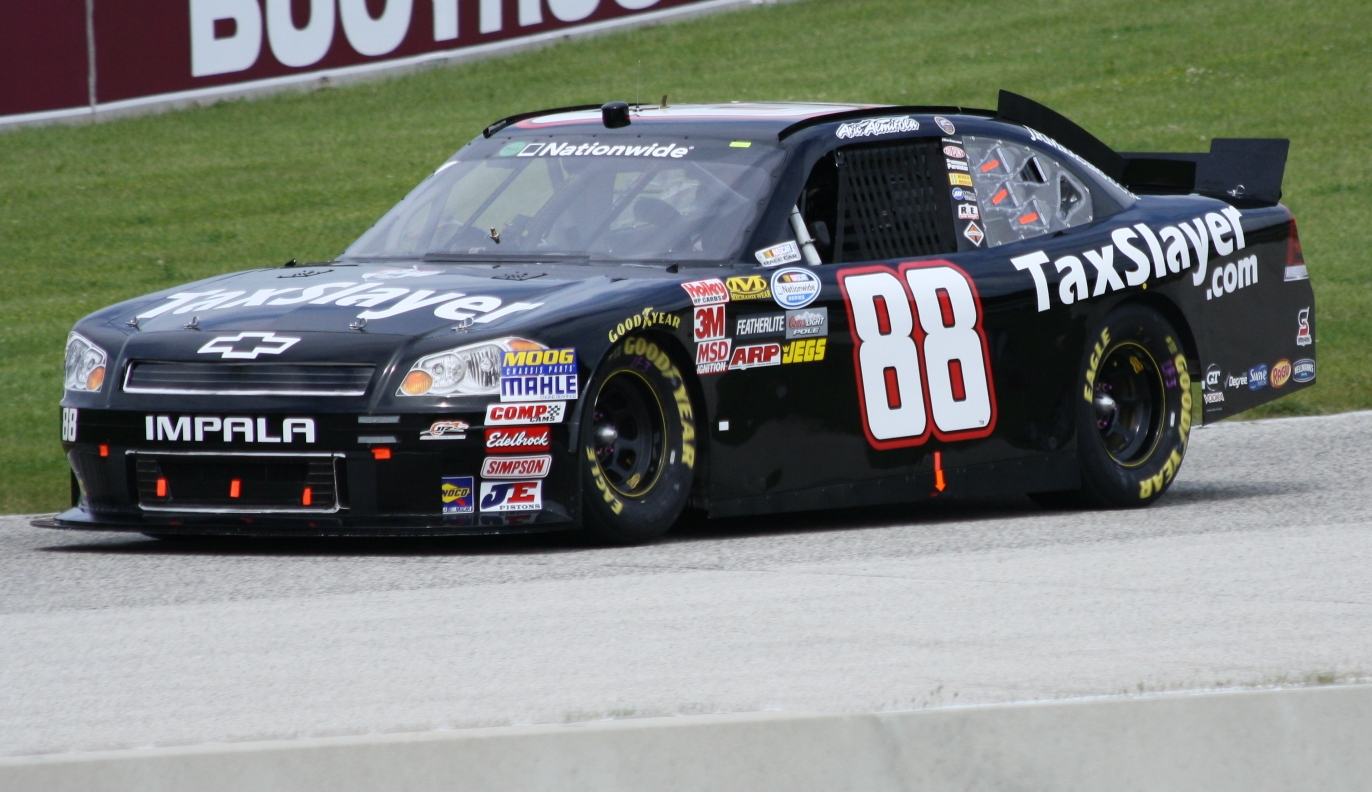
Aric Almirola driving the No. 88 car in the 2011 Bucyrus 200

Aric Almirola (2010–2011)

Former DEI development driver Aric Almirola moved up from the Truck Series to drive the car full-time in 2011 as a part of a two-year deal. With sponsorship from Unilever, Grand Touring Vodka, and TaxSlayer, Almirola ended up fourth in points in his first full-time season.

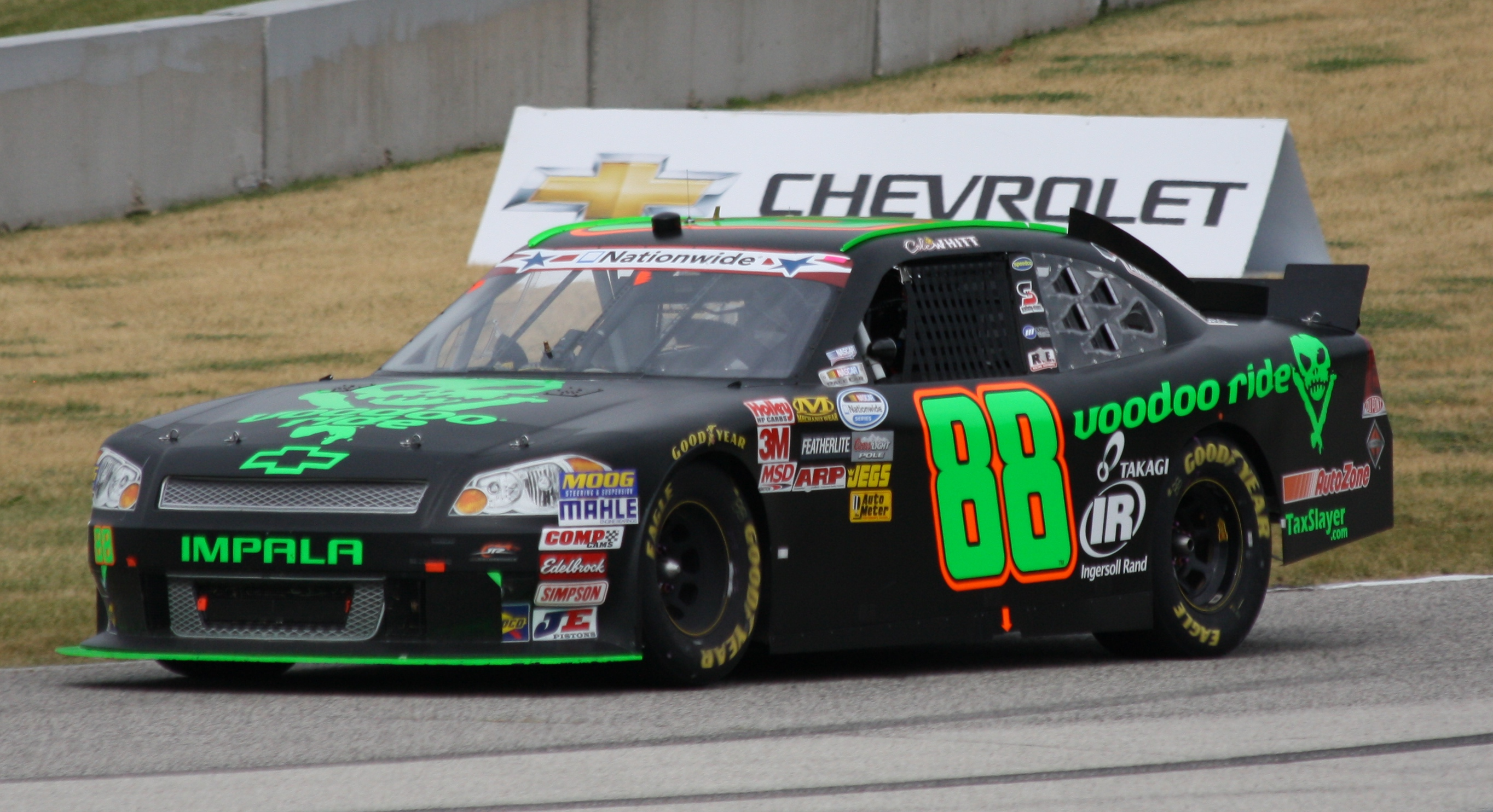
Whitt in 2012 at Road America

Cole Whitt (2012)

Almirola then left JRM after 2011 to join Richard Petty Motorsports in the Cup Series, while the No. 88 was taken by former Red Bull development driver Cole Whitt in 2012 for his rookie season. Whitt had a consistent rookie season despite switching crew chiefs from Tony Eury Sr. to Bruce Cook. Whitt recorded a best finish of 4th at Daytona, Talladega, and Michigan, finishing 7th in the point standings but lost the Rookie of the Year battle to Austin Dillon.

Part-time (2013–2014)

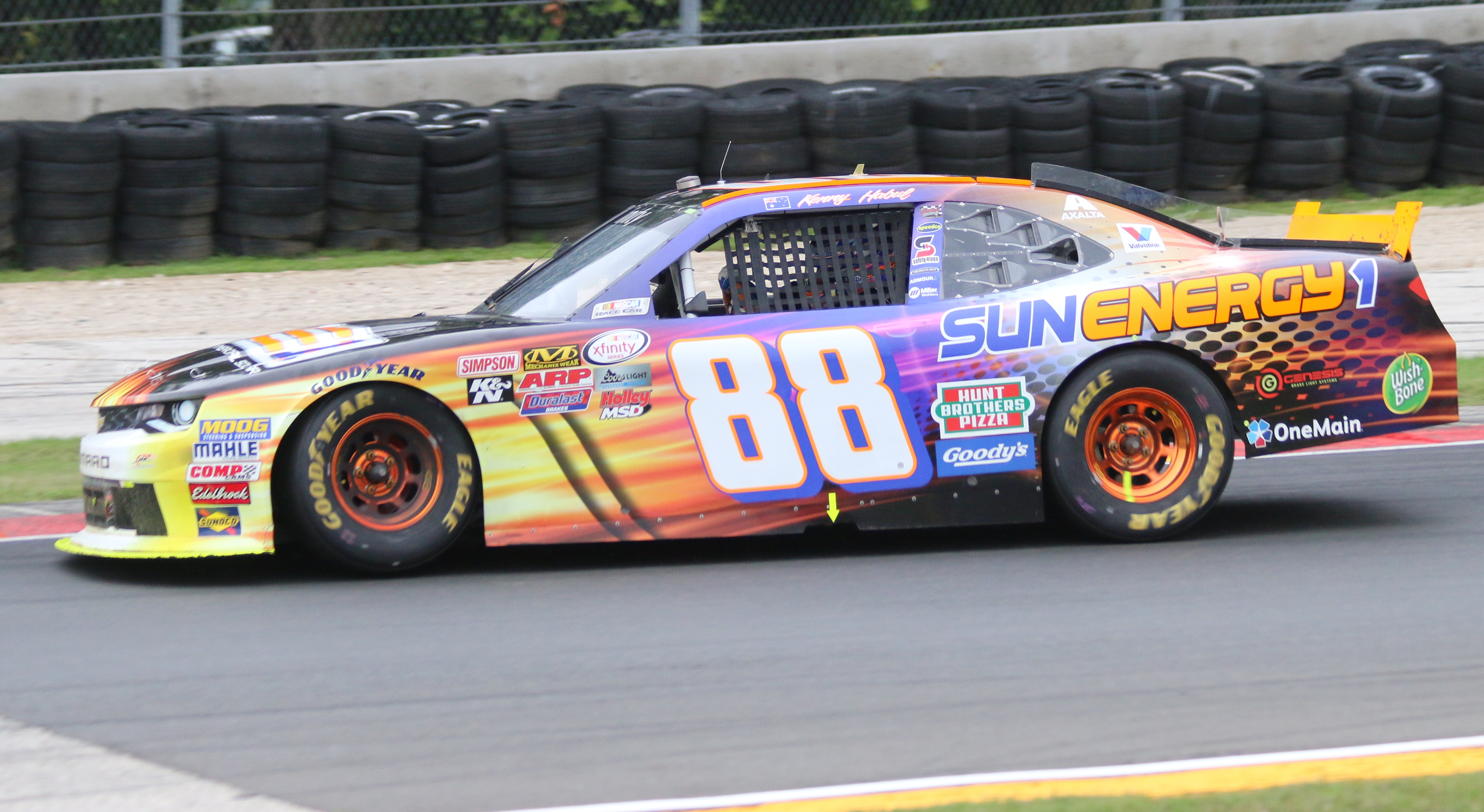
Kenny Habul at Road America 2016

With the team unable to find sponsorship for Whitt for 2013, the No. 88 was used by Dale Jr. in his limited Nationwide Series schedule (to keep consistency with his Cup Series number).

Multiple drivers (2015–2016)

Dale Jr. and Kevin Harvick drove the car for the first two races of the 2014 season before switching the owner's points to the No. 5. In 2015 the No. 5 team became the No. 88 team, and was driven by Dale Jr. in four races, Kevin Harvick in twelve races, Kasey Kahne in seven races, and Ben Rhodes in ten races. On April 23, 2016, Dale Earnhardt Jr. piloted the No. 88 to victory at Richmond International Raceway, his first Xfinity win in six years and first with JR Motorsports.

Part-time (2017–2018, 2022–2024)

It was announced in late-2016 that the No. 88 would be downgraded to a part-time ride for 2017 for Earnhardt Jr. and Kahne.

Chase Elliott drove the No. 88 in the 2018 season opening race at Daytona. Despite being black flagged after losing a window, he still managed to finish twelfth. Earnhardt Jr. raced the car at the Federated Auto Parts 250 in Richmond, where he led a race-high 96 laps before finishing in fourth place. Impressed by his finish, Earnhardt Jr. said he would try to run another race in the 2019 season.

With Josh Berry driving the 8 full-time in 2022, Earnhardt Jr. opened a fifth part-time entry for himself at Martinsville and for Miguel Paludo at three of the road courses. Three Hendrick Motorsports drivers: Chase Elliott, William Byron, and Kyle Larson drove the No. 88 at select races. Elliott did not qualify for the Darlington spring race, which marked the first time that team did not qualify. Byron finished second at Texas and 26th at New Hampshire. Larson won at Watkins Glen after Byron (driving the Hendrick Motorsports No. 17 entry) and Ty Gibbs spun off-course while fighting for the lead during the final restart. At Watkins Glen, Connor Zilisch won the pole, led the most laps, and saved enough fuel in two overtime restarts for the win in his Xfinity Series debut, becoming the first driver in over three years (Ty Gibbs at the 2021 Daytona RC race) to win in their Xfinity Series debut.

Connor Zilisch (2025)

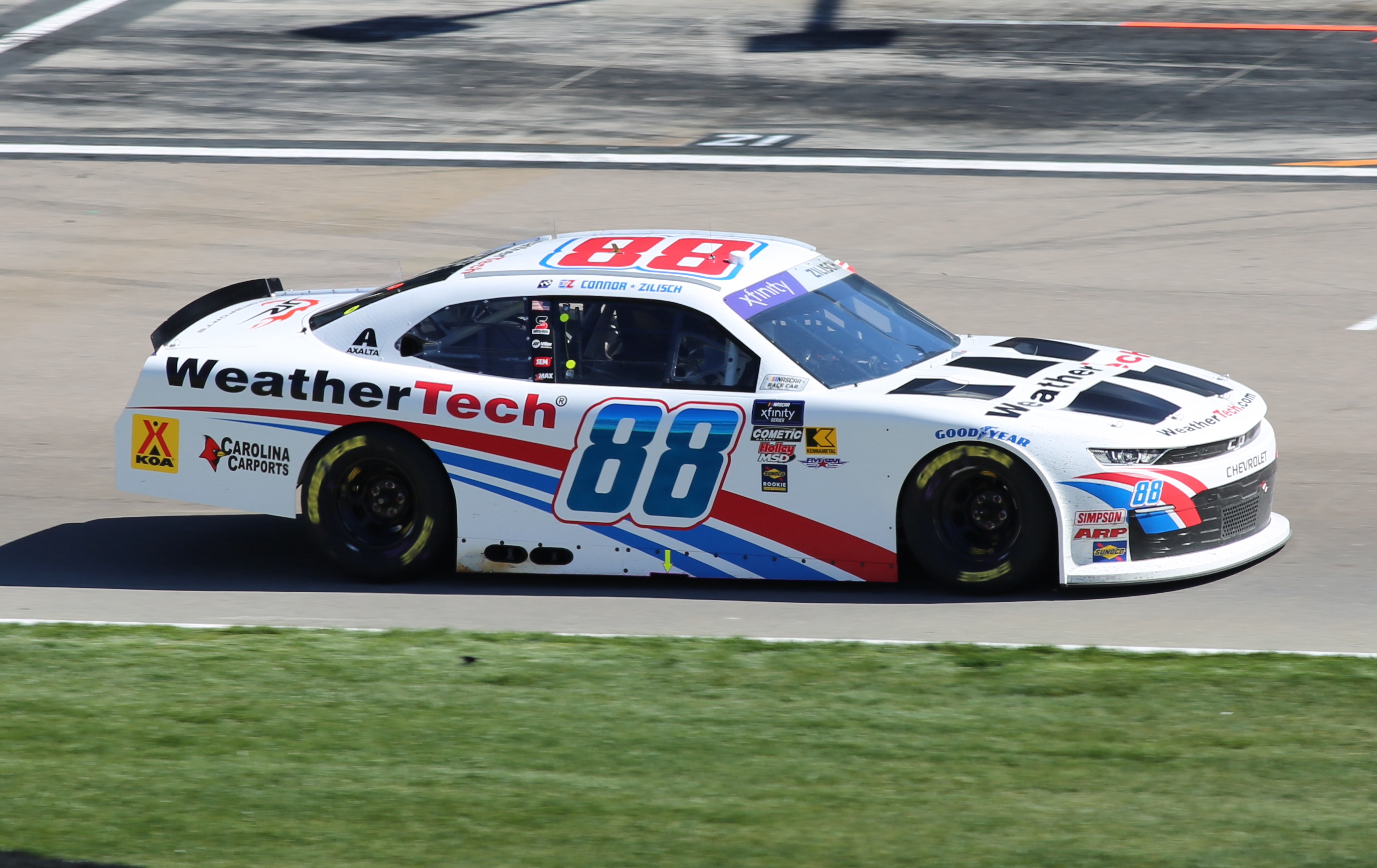
Connor Zilisch in the No. 88 car at Las Vegas Motor Speedway in 2025

On August 7, 2024, it was announced on The Dale Jr. Download that Zilisch will drive the No. 88 car for JRM full-time in 2025. At Talladega, Zilisch suffered a spinal injury after hitting the inside wall head-on during an accident. Kyle Larson filled in for Zilisch at Texas and won on double overtime. Zilisch returned with back-to-back second place finishes at Charlotte and Nashville. Following the Nashville race, crew chief Mardy Lindley was suspended for one race for two unsecured lug nuts. With Dale Earnhardt Jr. as his substitute crew chief, Zilisch scored his second win of the season at Pocono. Zilisch would beat teammate Shane Van Gisbergen at Sonoma. The following week, he won at Dover, after the race was shortened by 66 laps. He also won the next weekend at Indianapolis, earning JRM their 100th-career victory in the series. Two weeks later, Zilisch won at Watkins Glen after a late red flag delayed the race. While exiting his car during the celebration in victory lane, Zilisch lost his footing on the driver's window sill after exiting and fell to the floor head-first. Safety members responded quickly, and he was transported by ambulance to a local hospital, where doctors determined that while CT scans returned no sign of head injuries, he suffered a broken collarbone. Zilisch would race the next event at Daytona, which was conveniently after a week off, but the injury forced him to be replaced at the first caution. Parker Kligerman took over the car and won the race, with Zilisch receiving the credit as the driver who started the car. After recovering from the injury, Zilisch returned and won at Portland and the series' return to Gateway to secure the Regular Season Championship with nine wins on the season. In the playoffs, Zilisch recorded his tenth and final race win of the year at the Charlotte Roval. Zilisch would advance to the Championship 4 after the fall Talladega race, where he finished 23rd, snapping his record-breaking streak of eighteen-straight top-five finishes in the series, dating back to Charlotte in May. Zilisch led late in the final race at Phoenix Raceway, but was passed for the race lead and the championship by Jesse Love, and subsequently by Aric Almirola for second place. Zilisch finished in third place in the race and second in the championship.

Rajah Caruth (2026–present)

Rajah Caruth in the No. 88 car at Las Vegas in 2026

On October 21, 2025, it was announced that Rajah Caruth would drive the No. 88 part time in 2026. William Byron and Kyle Larson would each make three appearances in the No. 88, while Hendrick Motorsports teammates Alex Bowman and Chase Elliott will each drive the No. 88 twice. However, Bowman ended up not making any starts in the No. 88 with Larson replaced him for his two scheduled events. Larson won at Las Vegas and Texas.

On November 3, 2026, it was announced that Caruth will drive the No. 88 full-time in 2027.

==== Car No. 88 results ====
Year	Driver	No.	Make	1	2	3	4	5	6	7	8	9	10	11	12	13	14	15	16	17	18	19	20	21	22	23	24	25	26	27	28	29	30	31	32	33	34	35	NXSC	Pts
2005	Mark McFarland	88	Chevy	DAY	CAL	MXC	LVS	ATL	NSH	BRI	TEX	PHO	TAL	DAR	RCH	CLT	DOV	NSH	KEN	MLW	DAY	CHI	NHA	PPR	GTY	IRP	GLN	MCH	BRI	CAL	RCH	DOV	KAN	CLT	MEM	TEX	PHO	HOM; 20	148th	-
2006	Mark McFarland	88	Chevy	DAY; 22	CAL; 30	MXC; 15	LVS; 27	ATL; 15	BRI; 31	TEX; 23	NSH; 33	PHO; 16	TAL; 7	RCH; 34	DAR; 18	CLT; 33	DOV; 30	NSH; 22	KEN; 26	MLW; 33			NHA; 11	MAR; 16	GTY; 25	IRP; 17													19th	3449
2006	Martin Truex Jr.	88	Chevy																		DAY; 8	CHI; 16					GLN; 6												19th	3449
2006	Robby Gordon	88	Chevy																									MCH; 3		CAL; 9									19th	3449
2006	Shane Huffman	88	Chevy																										BRI; 31		RCH; 22	DOV; 36	KAN; 21	CLT; 39	MEM; 5	TEX; 42	PHO; 8	HOM; 37	19th	3449
2007	Shane Huffman	88	Chevy	DAY; 36	CAL; 21	MXC; 21	LVS; 9	ATL; 19	BRI; 38	NSH; 6	TEX; 39	PHO; 42	TAL; 15	RCH; 18	DAR; 27	CLT; 24	DOV; 37	NSH; 19	KEN; 5	MLW; 10	NHA; 23																		17th	3642
2007	Dale Earnhardt Jr.	88	Chevy																			DAY; 14																	17th	3642
2007	Brad Keselowski	88	Chevy																				CHI; 14	GTY; 26	IRP; 10			MCH; 13	BRI; 7	CAL; 35	RCH; 38	DOV; 7	KAN; 36	CLT; 11	MEM; 9	TEX; 6	PHO; 21	HOM; 17	17th	3642
2007	Andy Pilgrim	88	Chevy																							CGV; 15	GLN; 15												17th	3642
2008	Brad Keselowski	88	Chevy	DAY; 16	CAL; 32	LVS; 23	ATL; 6	BRI; 4	NSH; 4	TEX; 15	PHO; 12	MXC; 8	TAL; 23	RCH; 11	DAR; 15	CLT; 3	DOV; 7	NSH; 1	KEN; 4	MLW; 8*	NHA; 10	DAY; 5	CHI; 3	GTY; 5	IRP; 19	CGV; 12	GLN; 6	MCH; 11	BRI; 1	CAL; 33	RCH; 21	DOV; 3	KAN; 6	CLT; 8	MEM; 17	TEX; 7	PHO; 21	HOM; 3	4th	4794
2009	Brad Keselowski	88	Chevy	DAY; 22	CAL; 27	LVS; 27	BRI; 12	TEX; 3	NSH; 3	PHO; 3	TAL; 9	RCH; 4	DAR; 11	CLT; 8	DOV; 1	NSH; 2	KEN; 3	MLW; 3	NHA; 3	DAY; 6	CHI; 18	GTY; 8	IRP; 4	IOW; 1*	GLN; 9	MCH; 1	BRI; 3	CGV; 5	ATL; 4	RCH; 4	DOV; 3	KAN; 3	CAL; 5	CLT; 6	MEM; 1	TEX; 5	PHO; 5	HOM; 12	3rd	5364
2010	Dale Earnhardt Jr.	88	Chevy	DAY; 29																							BRI; 4												8th	4496
2010	Kelly Bires	88	Chevy		CAL; 7	LVS; 42	BRI; 12	NSH; 14	PHO; 17																														8th	4496
2010	Jamie McMurray	88	Chevy							TEX; 6	TAL; 14	RCH; 3	DAR; 3	DOV; 3	CLT; 11						CHI; 9								ATL; 1										8th	4496
2010	Coleman Pressley	88	Chevy													NSH; 12	KEN; 18																						8th	4496
2010	Ron Fellows	88	Chevy															ROA; 2							GLN; 6			CGV; 30											8th	4496
2010	Elliott Sadler	88	Chevy																NHA; 13							MCH; 7				RCH; 13	DOV; 31								8th	4496
2010	Greg Sacks	88	Chevy																	DAY; 21																			8th	4496
2010	Steve Arpin	88	Chevy																			GTY; 13		IOW; 18															8th	4496
2010	Aric Almirola	88	Chevy																				IRP; 3									KAN; 22	CAL; 6	CLT; 8		TEX; 16	PHO; 6	HOM; 32	8th	4496
2010	Josh Wise	88	Chevy																																GTY; 7				8th	4496
2011	Aric Almirola	88	Chevy	DAY; 19	PHO; 13	LVS; 15	BRI; 10	CAL; 9	TEX; 12	TAL; 8	NSH; 10	RCH; 14	DAR; 28	DOV; 9	IOW; 17	CLT; 9	CHI; 4	MCH; 15	ROA; 22	DAY; 9	KEN; 20	NHA; 5	NSH; 5	IRP; 4	IOW; 5	GLN; 8	CGV; 20	BRI; 5	ATL; 8	RCH; 7	CHI; 4	DOV; 15	KAN; 12	CLT; 15	TEX; 19	PHO; 25	HOM; 8		9th	1095
2012	Cole Whitt	88	Chevy	DAY; 4	PHO; 13	LVS; 6	BRI; 16	CAL; 30	TEX; 13	RCH; 19	TAL; 4	DAR; 10	IOW; 7	CLT; 28	DOV; 14	MCH; 4	ROA; 9	KEN; 14	DAY; 29	NHA; 18	CHI; 9	IND; 17	IOW; 19	GLN; 24	CGV; 33	BRI; 6	ATL; 8	RCH; 14	CHI; 14	KEN; 6	DOV; 6	CLT; 13	KAN; 5	TEX; 12	PHO; 29	HOM; 10			12th	994
2013	Dale Earnhardt Jr.	88	Chevy	DAY; 4	PHO	LVS; 14	BRI	CAL	TEX; 4	RCH	TAL	DAR	CLT	DOV	IOW	MCH	ROA	KEN	DAY	NHA	CHI	IND	IOW	GLN	MOH	BRI	ATL	RCH	CHI; 5	KEN	DOV	KAN	CLT	TEX	PHO	HOM			43rd	151
2014	Dale Earnhardt Jr.	88	Chevy	DAY; 11		LVS; 4	BRI	CAL	TEX; 5	DAR	RCH	TAL	IOW	CLT	DOV	MCH; 3	ROA	KEN	DAY	NHA	CHI	IND	IOW	GLN	MOH	BRI	ATL	RCH	CHI	KEN	DOV	KAN	CLT	TEX	PHO	HOM			46th	81
2014	Kevin Harvick	88	Chevy		PHO; 2																																		46th	81
2015	Dale Earnhardt Jr.	88	Chevy	DAY; 10		LVS; 12			TEX; 3										KEN; 8																				12th	1057
2015	Kevin Harvick	88	Chevy		ATL; 1*		PHO; 3	CAL; 1*		BRI; 7	RCH; 18			CLT; 14		MCH; 6					IND; 6				BRI; 8	DAR; 4							KAN; 15	TEX; 2					12th	1057
2015	Kasey Kahne	88	Chevy									TAL; 33			DOV; 5			DAY; 4											CHI; 12			CLT; 12			PHO; 10				12th	1057
2015	Ben Rhodes	88	Chevy										IOW; 7				CHI; 21			NHA; 12		IOW; 30	GLN; 35	MOH; 10		ROA; 32				KEN; 30	DOV; 13					HOM; 20			12th	1057
2015	Josh Berry	88	Chevy																									RCH; 7											12th	1057
2016	Chase Elliott	88	Chevy	DAY; 1		LVS; 4	PHO; 5					TAL; 9						DAY; 9																					10th	2198
2016	Kevin Harvick	88	Chevy		ATL; 12			CAL; 6		BRI; 8											IND; 2						DAR; 35					CLT; 7		TEX; 3					10th	2198
2016	Dale Earnhardt Jr.	88	Chevy						TEX; 5		RCH; 1*																												10th	2198
2016	Alex Bowman	88	Chevy										DOV; 3		POC; 10	MCH; 7	IOW; 5			NHA; 8								RCH; 9			DOV; 5				PHO; 38	HOM; 14			10th	2198
2016	Cole Custer	88	Chevy											CLT; 4					KEN; 32																				10th	2198
2016	Josh Berry	88	Chevy																			IOW; 9								KEN; 13									10th	2198
2016	Kenny Habul	88	Chevy																				GLN; 17	MOH; 36		ROA; 34													10th	2198
2016	Regan Smith	88	Chevy																						BRI; 11								KAN; 6						10th	2198
2016	Clint Bowyer	88	Chevy																										CHI; 6										10th	2198
2017	Kasey Kahne	88	Chevy	DAY; 2	ATL	LVS	PHO	CAL	TEX	BRI	RCH	TAL; 15	CLT	DOV	POC	MCH	IOW	DAY	KEN	NHA	IND	IOW	GLN	MOH															39th	145
2017	Dale Earnhardt Jr.	88	Chevy																						BRI; 13	ROA	DAR	RCH; 9	CHI	KEN	DOV	CLT	KAN	TEX	PHO	HOM			39th	145
2018	Chase Elliott	88	Chevy	DAY; 12	ATL	LVS	PHO	CAL	TEX	BRI	RCH	TAL	DOV	CLT	POC	MCH	IOW	CHI	DAY	KEN	NHA	IOW	GLN	MOH	BRI	ROA	DAR	IND	LVS										42nd	86
2018	Dale Earnhardt Jr.	88	Chevy																											RCH; 4*	CLT	DOV	KAN	TEX	PHO	HOM			42nd	86
2022	Miguel Paludo	88	Chevy	DAY	CAL	LVS	PHO	ATL	COA; 9	RCH									ROA; 26	ATL			IND; 24	MCH															38th	197
2022	Dale Earnhardt Jr.	88	Chevy								MAR; 11	TAL	DOV																										38th	197
2022	Chase Elliott	88	Chevy											DAR; DNQ																									38th	197
2022	William Byron	88	Chevy												TEX; 2	CLT	PIR	NSH			NHA; 26	POC																	38th	197
2022	Kyle Larson	88	Chevy																						GLN; 1	DAY	DAR	KAN	BRI	TEX	TAL	CLT	LVS	HOM	MAR	PHO			38th	197
2023	Miguel Paludo	88	Chevy	DAY	CAL	LVS	PHO	ATL	COA; 13	RCH	MAR	TAL	DOV	DAR	CLT	PIR	SON	NSH	CSC; 13	ATL	NHA	POC	ROA	MCH	IRC; 22	GLN	DAY	DAR	KAN										40th	111
2023	Dale Earnhardt Jr.	88	Chevy																											BRI; 30	TEX	ROV	LVS	HOM; 5	MAR	PHO			40th	111
2024	Bubba Pollard	88	Chevy	DAY	ATL	LVS	PHO	COA	RCH; 6																														20th	520
2024	Carson Kvapil	88	Chevy							MAR; 4	TEX	TAL	DOV; 2	DAR; 19	CLT	PIR	SON	IOW	NHA; 5	NSH; 12			IND; 10	MCH; 26	DAY	DAR; 14	ATL				TAL; 27								20th	520
2024	Connor Mosack	88	Chevy																		CSC; 6	POC										ROV; 18	LVS						20th	520
2024	Connor Zilisch	88	Chevy																									GLN; 1*		KAN; 4				HOM; 17	MAR	PHO; 4			20th	520
2024	Dale Earnhardt Jr.	88	Chevy																										BRI; 7										20th	520
2025	Connor Zilisch	88	Chevy	DAY; 27	ATL; 34	COA; 1*	PHO; 16	LVS; 9	HOM; 12	MAR; 28*	DAR; 6	BRI; 12	ROC; 13	TAL; 27		CLT; 2	NSH; 2	MXC; 5	POC; 1	ATL; 4	CSC; 2	SON; 1*	DOV; 1*	IND; 1	IOW; 4	GLN; 1*	DAY; 1	PIR; 1*	GTW; 1*	BRI; 5*	KAN; 2	ROV; 1*	LVS; 2	TAL; 23	MAR; 9	PHO; 3			2nd	4034
2025	Kyle Larson	88	Chevy												TEX; 1																								2nd	4034
2026	Rajah Caruth	88	Chevy	DAY; 10	ATL; 8	COA; 31				MAR; 25	CAR; 4			TAL; 30		GLN; 12	DOV; 14	CLT; 10			COR; 22	SON; 14		ATL; 9		IOW; 2	DAY; 32	DAR; 26	GTW; 11	BRI; 23	LVS; 11	LVS; 36	PHO; 9	TAL; 17	MAR; 16	HOM; 18			11th	2269
2026	William Byron	88	Chevy				PHO; 13						KAN; 6							POC; 3																			11th	2269
2026	Kyle Larson	88	Chevy					LVS; 1	DAR; 4*			BRI; 2*			TEX; 1*				NSH; 8																				11th	2269
2026	Chase Elliott	88	Chevy																				CHI; 2*		IND; 4														11th	2269

== Camping World Truck Series ==
=== Truck No. 00 history ===
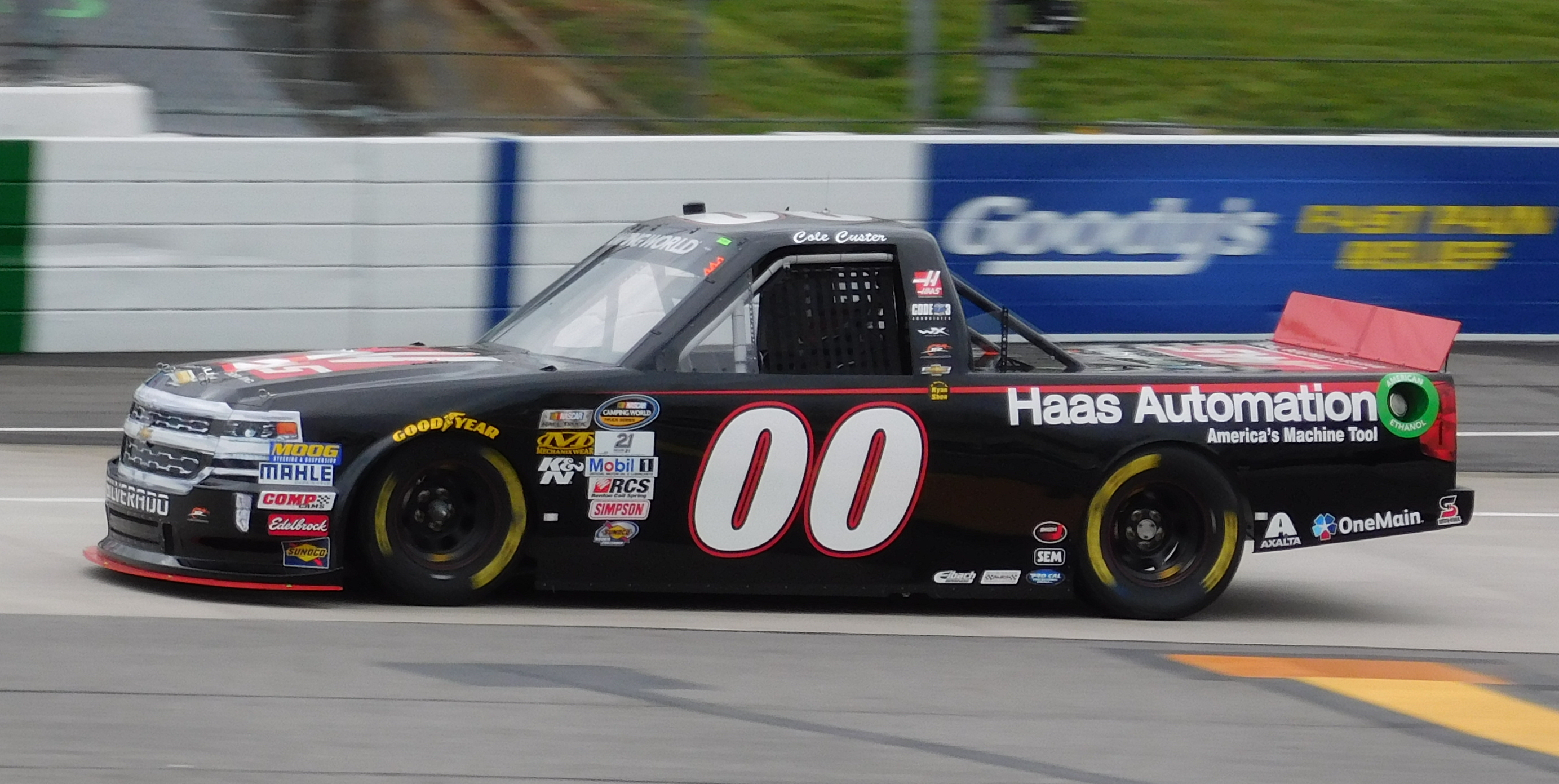
Cole Custer at Martinsville Speedway in 2016

Multiple Drivers (2015)

On January 12, 2015, JR Motorsports announced that Haas Racing Development driver Cole Custer would drive a truck for the team in ten races in 2015, marking the team's first foray into the Camping World Truck Series. Trucks were acquired from former Hendrick development partner Turner Scott Motorsports after that team ceased operations. The team operated out of a satellite facility in Mooresville, North Carolina. The truck's number (No. 00) and sponsor (Haas Automation) both came with the team from Haas Racing. Under NASCAR's age requirement rules for the Truck Series, the seventeen-year-old Custer ran ten races, all at tracks under 1.1 miles (1,800 m) in length (and Gateway Motorsports Park), with the team planning a full-time run in 2016 for the championship. Kasey Kahne, Kevin Harvick, Kyle Larson, Alex Bowman, and Jeb Burton also ran races in the No. 00 truck. The No. 00 ran fifteen races, winning twice: with Kahne at Charlotte in May, and with Custer at Gateway in June.

Cole Custer (2016)

In 2016, Custer went full time in the No. 00 and won the pole at Canadian Tire Motorsports Park, and looked to be the truck to beat. After leading the most laps, it seemed as though Custer would score his first win of the season and a spot in the inaugural chase, until John Hunter Nemechek put Custer into the grass and into the fence to win the race. After the race, Custer tackled Nemechek to the ground and was soon separated by NASCAR officials. No fines or penalties would be handed out to either driver.

In early January 2017, JRM announced the end of their participation in truck racing - to focus fully on their Xfinity Series entries.

==== Truck No. 00 results ====
Year	Driver	No.	Make	1	2	3	4	5	6	7	8	9	10	11	12	13	14	15	16	17	18	19	20	21	22	23	NCWTC	Pts
2015	Cole Custer	00	Chevy	DAY	ATL	MAR; 16	KAN		DOV; 13*	TEX	GTW; 1	IOW; 9	KEN	ELD; 29			BRI; 16*	MSP; 10*		NHA; 24	LVS	TAL	MAR; 4*		PHO; 26	HOM	18th	305
2015	Kasey Kahne	00	Chevy					CLT; 1																			18th	305
2015	Kevin Harvick	00	Chevy												POC; 2												18th	305
2015	Alex Bowman	00	Chevy													MCH; 11											18th	305
2015	Kyle Larson	00	Chevy																CHI; 7								18th	305
2015	Jeb Burton	00	Chevy																					TEX; 16			18th	305
2016	Cole Custer	00	Chevy	DAY; 24	ATL; 17	MAR; 29	KAN; 7	DOV; 5	CLT; 13	TEX; 14	IOW; 2	GTW; 15	KEN; 14	ELD; 6	POC; 5	BRI; 6	MCH; 22	MSP; 2*	CHI; 9	NHA; 6	LVS; 3	TAL; 29	MAR; 7	TEX; 9	PHO; 10	HOM; 10	10th	502

=== Truck No. 49 history ===
In 2016, the team fielded a second truck numbered 49 for Nick Drake, a Haas Racing Development driver like Cole Custer, beginning at Dover. The entry was fielded in a collaboration with Premium Motorsports, a fellow Truck Series team which normally runs the No. 49. Drake's paint scheme is similar to Cole Custer's, with the same Haas Automation sponsorship. In Drake's first career start at Dover, he finished a solid sixteenth. Drake made his second start at Iowa Speedway. The truck did not make any other starts with JR Motorsports equipment. Like the No. 00, the No. 49 was shut down due to sponsor Haas Automation leaving the team.

==== Truck No. 49 results ====
Year	Driver	No.	Make	1	2	3	4	5	6	7	8	9	10	11	12	13	14	15	16	17	18	19	20	21	22	23	NCWTC	Pts
2016	Nick Drake	49	Chevy	DAY	ATL	MAR	KAN	DOV; 16	CLT	TEX	IOW; 23	GTW	KEN	ELD	POC	BRI	MCH	MSP	CHI	NHA	LVS	TAL	MAR	TEX	PHO	HOM		

=== Truck No. 71 history ===
In 2016, JR Motorsports entered a second truck in collaboration with Contreras Motorsports for Chase Elliott in the Texas Roadhouse 200 at Martinsville Speedway with NAPA and Valvoline as co-sponsors. Elliott started on the pole and led 109 of 200 laps before finishing in second.

==== Truck No. 71 results ====
Year	Driver	No.	Make	1	2	3	4	5	6	7	8	9	10	11	12	13	14	15	16	17	18	19	20	21	22	23	NCWTC	Pts
2016	Chase Elliott	71	Chevy	DAY	ATL	MAR	KAN	DOV	CLT	TEX	IOW	GTW	KEN	ELD	POC	BRI	MCH	MSP	CHI	NHA	LVS	TAL	MAR; 2*	TEX	PHO	HOM		

== Other racing series ==
=== ARCA Menards Series ===
JRM has competed in six ARCA Racing Series events. Landon Cassill made the team debut in 2008 driving the No. 88 Chevrolet at Daytona and finished 7th. He returned at Talladega but finished 39th due to a crash.

The team would not compete in 2009 but returned for the 2010 ARCA Racing Series' season. Danica Patrick drove the No. 7 car at Daytona and finished 6th.

The team did not run between 2011 and 2014 but returned in 2015 with Cole Custer behind the wheel of the No. 00 Chevrolet. Custer made the pole position and led fifteen laps but finished fifth at New Jersey Motorsports Park. He returned at the first Pocono race but finished 24th due to an axle problem. He then returned for the second Pocono race, started fifth, and won the race, after leading eighteen laps. That win was the first and only win of JR Motorsports in ARCA. That race also was the last of the team in ARCA.

=== CARS Tour/NASCAR Advanced Auto Parts Weekly Series ===
JR Motorsports has fielded a regional late model program since 2002.

JR Motorsports fields the No. 88 Chevrolet driven by Josh Berry and various other drivers in Late Models. Berry, who has driven for JRM since 2010, captured the 2012 Motor Mile Speedway championship in the NASCAR Advance Auto Parts Weekly Series, the first championship for JRM at any level, running eighteen races while collecting six poles and fifteen top-five finishes. Berry scored a second track championship at Hickory Motor Speedway in 2014. William Byron scored a single victory to finish runner up to Berry for the NASCAR-sanctioned track championship at Hickory. Pierce, who finished second in his Camping World Truck Series debut in the Mudsummer Classic at Eldora Speedway during the 2015 season, made his debut with JRM that year at Hickory Motor Speedway.

Christian Eckes ran the No. 1 Chevrolet for the 2016 season finishing fourth in the championship behind Berry in third.

Anthony Alfredo was the Late Model development driver for the 2017 CARS Tour season, running the No. 8, and would go on to win two races and finish a close second in the championship to teammate Josh Berry.

On January 18, 2018, JRM announced the replacement of Alfredo, who announced the same day that he was moving to the K&N Series with MDM Motorsports, with fourteen-year-old Sam Mayer, which later on that year made his K&N Series debut and drove for MDM in his third race in the K&N Series. On August 4, 2018, Mayer would drive the 28 and Berry would drive the 73 for the throwback weekend at Hickory Motor Speedway. Mayer went on to collect one win and finish fifth in the standings behind Berry in fourth in his No. 8 Chevrolet.

Adam Lemke ran the new No. 98 in 2019 and unfortunately struggled for most of the season and finished ninth in the standings and missed two races.

Connor Mosack ran the No. 98 in the final race of 2019 and would go on to run full-time in 2020 at first in the No. 8 but would start running the No. 88 after Berry focused on an Advance Auto Parts Weekly Series National Championship, he finished sixth in the standings.

William Cox III was announced to run for JR Motorsports full-time in the CARS Tour for 2021, however he was released four races in and was replaced by Conner Jones for majority of the remaining races. Josh Berry ran a few late model races also in 2021.

Carson Kvapil, son of former NASCAR Camping World Truck Series champion Travis Kvapil, would run the No. 8 full-time in 2022 after closing the 2021 season for the team. Carson would dominate in 2022 and 2023 winning back-to-back championships.

Following Carson Kvapil's promotion to the Xfinity Series, it was announced that two-time and defending Weekly Series National Champion and CARS Tour regular, Connor Hall, would take over the No. 88 full-time in 2025.

In 2026, Carson's younger brother, Caden Kvapil would drive the No. 88 full-time.

JRM's late model program has fielded rides for current NASCAR spotter T. J. Majors and Jeremy McGrath. It is currently overseen by Kelley Earnhardt Miller's husband, L. W. Miller.

== Speed 1 ==
In 2007, JR Motorsports supplied cars for Speed Channel's NASCAR coverage. The Speed 1 fleet for NASCAR RaceDay included a pair of fourth-generation cars for superspeedways and intermediate tracks each, and a Car of Tomorrow. Speed 1 was driven by Hermie Sadler.
