= 2023 Kansas Lottery 300 =

26th race of the 2023 NASCAR Xfinity Series

Race details
- Race 26 of 33 of the 2023 NASCAR Xfinity Series
- Date: September 9, 2023
- Official name: 23rd Annual Kansas Lottery 300
- Location: Kansas Speedway, Kansas City, Kansas
- Course: Permanent racing facility
- Course length: 1.5 miles (2.4 km)
- Distance: 200 laps, 300 mi (482 km)
- Scheduled distance: 200 laps, 300 mi (482 km)
- Average speed: 109.256 mph (175.830 km/h)

Pole position
Driver	Justin Allgaier	JR Motorsports
- Time: 30.646

Most laps led
Driver	John Hunter Nemechek	Joe Gibbs Racing
- Laps: 154

Winner
No. 20	John Hunter Nemechek	Joe Gibbs Racing

Television in the United States
- Network: NBC
- Announcers: Rick Allen, Jeff Burton, Steve Letarte, and Dale Earnhardt Jr.

Radio in the United States
- Radio: MRN

The 2023 Kansas Lottery 300 was the 26th stock car race of the 2023 NASCAR Xfinity Series, the final race of the regular season, and the 23rd iteration of the event. The race was held on Saturday, September 9, 2023, in Kansas City, Kansas at Kansas Speedway, a 1.5 miles (2.4 km) permanent quad-oval shaped racetrack. The race took the scheduled 200 laps to complete. John Hunter Nemechek, driving for Joe Gibbs Racing, would put on a blistering performance, winning both stages and leading a race-high 154 laps, earning his ninth career NASCAR Xfinity Series win, and his sixth of the season. To fill out the podium, Brandon Jones, driving for JR Motorsports, and Sheldon Creed, driving for Richard Childress Racing, would finish 2nd and 3rd, respectively.

The race was noted with a battle for the final playoff spot between Riley Herbst and Parker Kligerman. Herbst and Kligerman entered the race with one point separating each other. After a series of issues for Herbst, he would fail to make the playoffs for the first time in his Xfinity Series career. Kligerman would have a strong day, finishing in fourth after running top ten for most of the race, earning a spot in the playoffs for the first time in his career, and the first for Big Machine Racing.

The 12 drivers that would qualify for the playoffs are John Hunter Nemechek, Austin Hill, Justin Allgaier, Cole Custer, Sam Mayer, Chandler Smith, Sammy Smith, Jeb Burton, Josh Berry, Sheldon Creed, Daniel Hemric, and Parker Kligerman. Following the race, Hill would claim the Regular Season Championship.

== Background ==
Kansas Speedway is a 1.5-mile (2.4 km) tri-oval race track in Kansas City, Kansas. It was built in 2001 and it currently hosts two annual NASCAR race weekends. The IndyCar Series also raced at here until 2011. The speedway is owned and operated by the International Speedway Corporation.

=== Entry list ===
- (R) denotes rookie driver.
- (i) denotes driver who is ineligible for series driver points.

#	Driver	Team	Make
00	Cole Custer	Stewart-Haas Racing	Ford
1	Sam Mayer	JR Motorsports	Chevrolet
02	Blaine Perkins (R)	Our Motorsports	Chevrolet
2	Sheldon Creed	Richard Childress Racing	Chevrolet
4	Garrett Smithley	JD Motorsports	Chevrolet
6	Brennan Poole	JD Motorsports	Chevrolet
07	Dawson Cram	SS-Green Light Racing	Chevrolet
7	Justin Allgaier	JR Motorsports	Chevrolet
08	Mason Massey	SS-Green Light Racing	Ford
8	Josh Berry	JR Motorsports	Chevrolet
9	Brandon Jones	JR Motorsports	Chevrolet
10	Daniel Hemric	Kaulig Racing	Chevrolet
11	Derek Kraus	Kaulig Racing	Chevrolet
16	Chandler Smith (R)	Kaulig Racing	Chevrolet
18	Sammy Smith (R)	Joe Gibbs Racing	Toyota
19	Joe Graf Jr.	Joe Gibbs Racing	Toyota
20	John Hunter Nemechek	Joe Gibbs Racing	Toyota
21	Austin Hill	Richard Childress Racing	Chevrolet
24	Connor Mosack (R)	Sam Hunt Racing	Toyota
25	Brett Moffitt	AM Racing	Ford
26	Kaz Grala	Sam Hunt Racing	Toyota
27	Jeb Burton	Jordan Anderson Racing	Chevrolet
28	C. J. McLaughlin	RSS Racing	Ford
29	Kyle Sieg	RSS Racing	Ford
31	Parker Retzlaff (R)	Jordan Anderson Racing	Chevrolet
35	Joey Gase	Emerling-Gase Motorsports	Toyota
38	Nick Leitz (i)	RSS Racing	Ford
39	Ryan Sieg	RSS Racing	Ford
43	Ryan Ellis	Alpha Prime Racing	Chevrolet
44	Leland Honeyman	Alpha Prime Racing	Chevrolet
45	Rajah Caruth (i)	Alpha Prime Racing	Chevrolet
48	Parker Kligerman	Big Machine Racing	Chevrolet
51	Jeremy Clements	Jeremy Clements Racing	Chevrolet
53	Matt Mills (i)	Emerling-Gase Motorsports	Chevrolet
66	Timmy Hill (i) (Note: Driver changed to Leland Honeyman for the race after Honeyman failed to qualify.)	MBM Motorsports	Ford
78	Anthony Alfredo	B. J. McLeod Motorsports	Chevrolet
91	Kyle Weatherman	DGM Racing	Chevrolet
92	Josh Williams	DGM Racing	Chevrolet
98	Riley Herbst	Stewart-Haas Racing	Ford
Official entry list

== Practice ==
The first and only practice session was held on Saturday, September 9, at 9:05 AM CST, and would last for 20 minutes. Daniel Hemric, driving for Kaulig Racing, would set the fastest time in the session, with a lap of 30.856, and an average speed of 175.006 mph (281.645 km/h).

Pos.	#	Driver	Team	Make	Time	Speed
1	10	Daniel Hemric	Kaulig Racing	Chevrolet	30.856	175.006
2	7	Justin Allgaier	JR Motorsports	Chevrolet	30.932	174.576
3	8	Josh Berry	JR Motorsports	Chevrolet	30.982	174.295
Full practice results

== Qualifying ==
Qualifying was held on Saturday, September 9, at 9:35 AM CST. Since Kansas Speedway is an intermediate racetrack, the qualifying system used is a single-car, one-lap system with only one round. In that round, whoever sets the fastest time will win the pole. Justin Allgaier, driving for JR Motorsports, would score the pole for the race, with a lap of 30.646, and an average speed of 176.206 mph (283.576 km/h).

Pos.	#	Driver	Team	Make	Time	Speed
1	7	Justin Allgaier	JR Motorsports	Chevrolet	30.646	176.206
2	18	Sammy Smith (R)	Joe Gibbs Racing	Toyota	30.796	175.347
3	00	Cole Custer	Stewart-Haas Racing	Ford	30.862	174.972
4	9	Brandon Jones	JR Motorsports	Chevrolet	30.879	174.876
5	10	Daniel Hemric	Kaulig Racing	Chevrolet	30.925	174.616
6	8	Josh Berry	JR Motorsports	Chevrolet	30.933	174.571
7	20	John Hunter Nemechek	Joe Gibbs Racing	Toyota	30.956	174.441
8	98	Riley Herbst	Stewart-Haas Racing	Ford	31.004	174.171
9	21	Austin Hill	Richard Childress Racing	Chevrolet	31.087	173.706
10	25	Brett Moffitt	AM Racing	Ford	31.092	173.678
11	19	Joe Graf Jr.	Joe Gibbs Racing	Toyota	31.094	173.667
12	16	Chandler Smith (R)	Kaulig Racing	Chevrolet	31.097	173.650
13	1	Sam Mayer	JR Motorsports	Chevrolet	31.138	173.422
14	39	Ryan Sieg	RSS Racing	Ford	31.168	173.255
15	48	Parker Kligerman	Big Machine Racing	Chevrolet	31.191	173.127
16	2	Sheldon Creed	Richard Childress Racing	Chevrolet	31.205	173.049
17	27	Jeb Burton	Jordan Anderson Racing	Chevrolet	31.266	172.712
18	11	Derek Kraus	Kaulig Racing	Chevrolet	31.273	172.673
19	91	Kyle Weatherman	DGM Racing	Chevrolet	31.397	171.991
20	24	Connor Mosack (R)	Sam Hunt Racing	Toyota	31.491	171.478
21	51	Jeremy Clements	Jeremy Clements Racing	Chevrolet	31.576	171.016
22	45	Rajah Caruth (i)	Alpha Prime Racing	Chevrolet	31.624	170.756
23	43	Ryan Ellis	Alpha Prime Racing	Chevrolet	31.645	170.643
24	92	Josh Williams	DGM Racing	Chevrolet	31.755	170.052
25	07	Dawson Cram	SS-Green Light Racing	Chevrolet	31.789	169.870
26	31	Parker Retzlaff (R)	Jordan Anderson Racing	Chevrolet	31.814	169.737
27	53	Matt Mills (i)	Emerling-Gase Motorsports	Chevrolet	31.872	169.428
28	66	Timmy Hill (i)	MBM Motorsports	Ford	31.884	169.364
29	29	Kyle Sieg	RSS Racing	Ford	31.895	169.306
30	38	Nick Leitz (i)	RSS Racing	Ford	31.898	169.290
31	26	Kaz Grala	Sam Hunt Racing	Toyota	31.931	169.115
32	78	Anthony Alfredo	B. J. McLeod Motorsports	Chevrolet	31.950	169.014
33	6	Brennan Poole	JD Motorsports	Chevrolet	31.957	168.977
Qualified by owner's points
34	4	Garrett Smithley	JD Motorsports	Chevrolet	31.964	168.940
35	02	Blaine Perkins (R)	Our Motorsports	Chevrolet	32.069	168.387
36	35	Joey Gase	Emerling-Gase Motorsports	Toyota	32.177	167.822
37	08	Mason Massey	SS-Green Light Racing	Ford	32.310	167.131
38	28	C. J. McLaughlin	RSS Racing	Ford	–	–
Failed to qualify
39	44	Leland Honeyman	Alpha Prime Racing	Chevrolet	32.078	168.340
Official qualifying results
Official starting lineup

== Race results ==
Stage 1 Laps: 45

Pos.	#	Driver	Team	Make	Pts
1	20	John Hunter Nemechek	Joe Gibbs Racing	Toyota	10
2	00	Cole Custer	Stewart-Haas Racing	Ford	9
3	7	Justin Allgaier	JR Motorsports	Chevrolet	8
4	9	Brandon Jones	JR Motorsports	Chevrolet	7
5	18	Sammy Smith (R)	Joe Gibbs Racing	Toyota	6
6	48	Parker Kligerman	Big Machine Racing	Chevrolet	5
7	21	Austin Hill	Richard Childress Racing	Chevrolet	4
8	2	Sheldon Creed	Richard Childress Racing	Chevrolet	3
9	98	Riley Herbst	Stewart-Haas Racing	Ford	2
10	11	Derek Kraus	Kaulig Racing	Chevrolet	1

Stage 2 Laps: 45

Pos.	#	Driver	Team	Make	Pts
1	20	John Hunter Nemechek	Joe Gibbs Racing	Toyota	10
2	18	Sammy Smith (R)	Joe Gibbs Racing	Toyota	9
3	7	Justin Allgaier	JR Motorsports	Chevrolet	8
4	8	Josh Berry	JR Motorsports	Chevrolet	7
5	21	Austin Hill	Richard Childress Racing	Chevrolet	6
6	2	Sheldon Creed	Richard Childress Racing	Chevrolet	5
7	48	Parker Kligerman	Big Machine Racing	Chevrolet	4
8	11	Derek Kraus	Kaulig Racing	Chevrolet	3
9	31	Parker Retzlaff (R)	Jordan Anderson Racing	Chevrolet	2
10	25	Brett Moffitt	AM Racing	Ford	1

Stage 3 Laps: 110

Pos.	St	#	Driver	Team	Make	Laps	Led	Status	Pts
1	7	20	John Hunter Nemechek	Joe Gibbs Racing	Toyota	200	154	Running	60
2	4	9	Brandon Jones	JR Motorsports	Chevrolet	200	2	Running	42
3	16	2	Sheldon Creed	Richard Childress Racing	Chevrolet	200	0	Running	42
4	15	48	Parker Kligerman	Big Machine Racing	Chevrolet	200	0	Running	42
5	9	21	Austin Hill	Richard Childress Racing	Chevrolet	200	0	Running	42
6	6	8	Josh Berry	JR Motorsports	Chevrolet	200	0	Running	38
7	10	25	Brett Moffitt	AM Racing	Ford	200	0	Running	31
8	18	11	Derek Kraus	Kaulig Racing	Chevrolet	200	0	Running	33
9	11	19	Joe Graf Jr.	Joe Gibbs Racing	Toyota	200	0	Running	28
10	31	26	Kaz Grala	Sam Hunt Racing	Toyota	200	0	Running	27
11	26	31	Parker Retzlaff (R)	Jordan Anderson Racing	Chevrolet	200	0	Running	28
12	17	27	Jeb Burton	Jordan Anderson Racing	Chevrolet	199	0	Running	25
13	24	92	Josh Williams	DGM Racing	Chevrolet	199	0	Running	24
14	20	24	Connor Mosack (R)	Sam Hunt Racing	Toyota	199	0	Running	23
15	21	51	Jeremy Clements	Jeremy Clements Racing	Chevrolet	199	0	Running	22
16	37	08	Mason Massey	SS-Green Light Racing	Ford	199	0	Running	21
17	23	43	Ryan Ellis	Alpha Prime Racing	Chevrolet	199	0	Running	20
18	1	7	Justin Allgaier	JR Motorsports	Chevrolet	199	40	Running	35
19	27	53	Matt Mills (i)	Emerling-Gase Motorsports	Chevrolet	198	0	Running	0
20	29	29	Kyle Sieg	RSS Racing	Ford	198	0	Running	17
21	25	07	Dawson Cram	SS-Green Light Racing	Chevrolet	198	0	Running	16
22	38	28	C. J. McLaughlin	RSS Racing	Ford	198	0	Running	15
23	8	98	Riley Herbst	Stewart-Haas Racing	Ford	198	0	Running	16
24	36	35	Joey Gase	Emerling-Gase Motorsports	Toyota	198	0	Running	13
25	34	4	Garrett Smithley	JD Motorsports	Chevrolet	198	0	Running	12
26	28	66	Leland Honeyman	MBM Motorsports	Ford	197	0	Running	11
27	32	78	Anthony Alfredo	B. J. McLeod Motorsports	Chevrolet	197	0	Running	10
28	33	6	Brennan Poole	JD Motorsports	Chevrolet	197	0	Running	9
29	22	45	Rajah Caruth (i)	Alpha Prime Racing	Chevrolet	197	0	Running	0
30	14	39	Ryan Sieg	RSS Racing	Ford	196	0	Running	7
31	30	38	Nick Leitz (i)	RSS Racing	Ford	194	0	Running	0
32	12	16	Chandler Smith (R)	Kaulig Racing	Chevrolet	186	0	Running	5
33	35	02	Blaine Perkins (R)	Our Motorsports	Chevrolet	140	0	Brakes	4
34	5	10	Daniel Hemric	Kaulig Racing	Chevrolet	120	0	Running	3
35	2	18	Sammy Smith (R)	Joe Gibbs Racing	Toyota	97	1	Accident	17
36	3	00	Cole Custer	Stewart-Haas Racing	Ford	60	3	Accident	10
37	13	1	Sam Mayer	JR Motorsports	Chevrolet	20	0	Accident	1
38	19	91	Kyle Weatherman	DGM Racing	Chevrolet	19	0	Accident	1
Official race results

== Standings after the race ==
Drivers' Championship standings

	Pos	Driver	Points
1	1	John Hunter Nemechek	2,049
1	2	Austin Hill	2,039 (-10)
	3	Justin Allgaier	2,026 (–23)
	4	Cole Custer	2,017 (–32)
	5	Sam Mayer	2,015 (–34)
3	6	Chandler Smith	2,009 (–40)
1	7	Josh Berry	2,009 (–40)
1	8	Sheldon Creed	2,008 (–41)
3	9	Sammy Smith	2,006 (–43)
3	10	Jeb Burton	2,006 (–43)
3	11	Daniel Hemric	2,003 (–46)
1	12	Parker Kligerman	2,002 (–47)
Official driver's standings

- Note: Only the first 12 positions are included for the driver standings.

== Notes ==
Previous race: 2023 Sport Clips Haircuts VFW 200	NASCAR Xfinity Series; 2023 season	Next race: 2023 Food City 300
