= 2023 Contender Boats 300 =

31st race of the 2023 NASCAR Xfinity Series

Race details
- Race 31 of 33 of the 2023 NASCAR Xfinity Series
- Date: October 21, 2023
- Official name: 29th Annual Contender Boats 300
- Location: Homestead–Miami Speedway, Homestead, Florida
- Course: Permanent racing facility
- Course length: 1.5 miles (2.4 km)
- Distance: 200 laps, 300 mi (482 km)
- Scheduled distance: 200 laps, 300 mi (482 km)
- Average speed: 116.517 mph (187.516 km/h)

Pole position
Driver	Cole Custer	Stewart–Haas Racing
- Time: 32.608

Most laps led
Driver	Cole Custer	Stewart–Haas Racing
- Laps: 114

Winner
No. 1	Sam Mayer	JR Motorsports

Television in the United States
- Network: USA
- Announcers: Rick Allen, Steve Letarte, and Dale Jarrett

Radio in the United States
- Radio: MRN

The 2023 Contender Boats 300 was the 31st stock car race of the 2023 NASCAR Xfinity Series, the second race of the Round of 8, and the 29th iteration of the event. The race washeld on Saturday, October 21, 2023, in Homestead, Florida at Homestead–Miami Speedway, a 1.5 miles (2.4 km) permanent oval shaped racetrack. The race took the scheduled 200 laps to complete. In a wild finish, Sam Mayer, driving for JR Motorsports, would take the lead in the late stages of the race, and held off a fast-charging Riley Herbst in the closing laps to earn his fourth career NASCAR Xfinity Series win, his fourth of the season, and his first win on an oval track. He would also earn a spot in the Championship 4. Cole Custer would dominate the majority of the race, winning the first stage and leading a race-high 114 laps, until hitting the wall and blowing a tire in the late stages. To fill out the podium, Herbst, driving for Stewart–Haas Racing, and John Hunter Nemechek, driving for Joe Gibbs Racing, would finish 2nd and 3rd, respectively.

== Background ==
Homestead–Miami Speedway is a motor racing track located in Homestead, Florida. The track, which has several configurations, has promoted several series of racing, including NASCAR, the NTT IndyCar Series and the Grand-Am Rolex Sports Car Series.

From 2002 to 2019, Homestead-Miami Speedway has hosted the final race of the season in all three of NASCAR's series: the NASCAR Cup Series, Xfinity Series and Craftsman Truck Series. The track has since held races on different dates in 2020 (June) and 2021 (February), which were both effected by the COVID-19 pandemic, before being moved back into the Playoffs as the second race of the Round of 8 in 2022, with the date being kept for 2023.

=== Entry list ===
- (R) denotes rookie driver.
- (i) denotes driver who is ineligible for series driver points.
- (P) denotes playoff driver.
- (OP) denotes owner's playoffs car.

#	Driver	Team	Make
00	Cole Custer (P)	Stewart–Haas Racing	Ford
1	Sam Mayer (P)	JR Motorsports	Chevrolet
02	Blaine Perkins (R)	Our Motorsports	Chevrolet
2	Sheldon Creed (P)	Richard Childress Racing	Chevrolet
4	J. J. Yeley	JD Motorsports	Chevrolet
6	Brennan Poole	JD Motorsports	Chevrolet
07	Natalie Decker	SS-Green Light Racing	Chevrolet
7	Justin Allgaier (P)	JR Motorsports	Chevrolet
08	Mason Massey	SS-Green Light Racing	Ford
8	Josh Berry	JR Motorsports	Chevrolet
9	Brandon Jones	JR Motorsports	Chevrolet
10	Daniel Hemric (OP)	Kaulig Racing	Chevrolet
11	Derek Kraus	Kaulig Racing	Chevrolet
16	Chandler Smith (R) (P)	Kaulig Racing	Chevrolet
18	Sammy Smith (R) (P)	Joe Gibbs Racing	Toyota
19	Joe Graf Jr.	Joe Gibbs Racing	Toyota
20	John Hunter Nemechek (P)	Joe Gibbs Racing	Toyota
21	Austin Hill (P)	Richard Childress Racing	Chevrolet
24	Connor Mosack (R)	Sam Hunt Racing	Toyota
25	Brett Moffitt	AM Racing	Ford
26	Kaz Grala	Sam Hunt Racing	Toyota
27	Jeb Burton	Jordan Anderson Racing	Chevrolet
28	C. J. McLaughlin	RSS Racing	Ford
29	Mason Maggio (i)	RSS Racing	Ford
31	Parker Retzlaff (R)	Jordan Anderson Racing	Chevrolet
35	Patrick Emerling	Emerling-Gase Motorsports	Chevrolet
38	Kyle Sieg	RSS Racing	Ford
39	Ryan Sieg	RSS Racing	Ford
43	Ryan Ellis	Alpha Prime Racing	Chevrolet
44	Jeffrey Earnhardt	Alpha Prime Racing	Chevrolet
45	Leland Honeyman	Alpha Prime Racing	Chevrolet
48	Parker Kligerman	Big Machine Racing	Chevrolet
51	Jeremy Clements	Jeremy Clements Racing	Chevrolet
53	Matt Mills (i)	Emerling-Gase Motorsports	Toyota
66	Ryan Newman	MBM Motorsports	Ford
74	Dawson Cram	CHK Racing	Chevrolet
78	Anthony Alfredo	B. J. McLeod Motorsports	Chevrolet
88	Dale Earnhardt Jr.	JR Motorsports	Chevrolet
91	Kyle Weatherman	DGM Racing	Chevrolet
92	Josh Williams	DGM Racing	Chevrolet
98	Riley Herbst	Stewart–Haas Racing	Ford
Official entry list

== Practice ==
The first and only practice session was held on Friday, October 20, at 6:05 PM EST, and would last for 20 minutes. Cole Custer, driving for Stewart–Haas Racing, would set the fastest time in the session, with a lap of 32.964, and an average speed of 163.815 mph (263.635 km/h).

Pos.	#	Driver	Team	Make	Time	Speed
1	00	Cole Custer (P)	Stewart–Haas Racing	Ford	32.964	163.815
2	20	John Hunter Nemechek (P)	Joe Gibbs Racing	Toyota	33.261	162.352
3	48	Parker Kligerman	Big Machine Racing	Chevrolet	33.387	161.740
Full practice results

== Qualifying ==
Qualifying was held on Friday, October 20, at 6:35 PM EST. Since Homestead–Miami Speedway is an intermediate racetrack, the qualifying system used is a single-car, one-lap system with only one round. In that round, whoever sets the fastest time will win the pole. Cole Custer, driving for Stewart–Haas Racing, would score the pole for the race, with a lap of 32.608, and an average speed of 165.604 mph (266.514 km/h)

Pos.	#	Driver	Team	Make	Time	Speed
1	00	Cole Custer (P)	Stewart–Haas Racing	Ford	32.608	165.604
2	20	John Hunter Nemechek (P)	Joe Gibbs Racing	Toyota	32.786	164.704
3	7	Justin Allgaier (P)	JR Motorsports	Chevrolet	32.888	164.194
4	21	Austin Hill (P)	Richard Childress Racing	Chevrolet	32.940	163.934
5	18	Sammy Smith (R) (P)	Joe Gibbs Racing	Toyota	33.020	163.537
6	25	Brett Moffitt	AM Racing	Ford	33.028	163.498
7	98	Riley Herbst	Stewart–Haas Racing	Ford	33.037	163.453
8	8	Josh Berry	JR Motorsports	Chevrolet	33.038	163.448
9	2	Sheldon Creed (P)	Richard Childress Racing	Chevrolet	33.068	163.300
10	48	Parker Kligerman	Big Machine Racing	Chevrolet	33.138	162.955
11	19	Joe Graf Jr.	Joe Gibbs Racing	Toyota	33.155	162.871
12	16	Chandler Smith (R) (P)	Kaulig Racing	Chevrolet	33.167	162.812
13	1	Sam Mayer (P)	JR Motorsports	Chevrolet	33.201	162.646
14	39	Ryan Sieg	RSS Racing	Ford	33.407	161.643
15	10	Daniel Hemric (OP)	Kaulig Racing	Chevrolet	33.425	161.556
16	31	Parker Retzlaff (R)	Jordan Anderson Racing	Chevrolet	33.463	161.372
17	9	Brandon Jones	JR Motorsports	Chevrolet	33.528	161.059
18	91	Kyle Weatherman	DGM Racing	Chevrolet	33.583	160.796
19	26	Kaz Grala	Sam Hunt Racing	Toyota	33.628	160.580
20	11	Derek Kraus	Kaulig Racing	Chevrolet	33.671	160.375
21	24	Connor Mosack (R)	Sam Hunt Racing	Toyota	33.753	159.986
22	51	Jeremy Clements	Jeremy Clements Racing	Chevrolet	33.822	159.659
23	88	Dale Earnhardt Jr.	JR Motorsports	Chevrolet	33.843	159.560
24	66	Ryan Newman	MBM Motorsports	Ford	33.939	159.109
25	38	Kyle Sieg	RSS Racing	Ford	33.971	158.959
26	92	Josh Williams	DGM Racing	Chevrolet	34.081	158.446
27	45	Leland Honeyman	Alpha Prime Racing	Chevrolet	34.093	158.390
28	27	Jeb Burton	Jordan Anderson Racing	Chevrolet	34.149	158.131
29	6	Brennan Poole	JD Motorsports	Chevrolet	34.215	157.826
30	29	Mason Maggio (i)	RSS Racing	Ford	34.271	157.568
31	78	Anthony Alfredo	B. J. McLeod Motorsports	Chevrolet	34.278	157.535
32	74	Dawson Cram	CHK Racing	Chevrolet	34.294	157.462
33	44	Jeffrey Earnhardt	Alpha Prime Racing	Chevrolet	34.357	157.173
Qualified by owner's points
34	02	Blaine Perkins (R)	Our Motorsports	Chevrolet	34.499	156.526
35	08	Mason Massey	SS-Green Light Racing	Ford	34.925	154.617
36	35	Patrick Emerling	Emerling-Gase Motorsports	Chevrolet	34.835	150.691
37	43	Ryan Ellis	Alpha Prime Racing	Chevrolet	36.200	149.171
38	28	C. J. McLaughlin	RSS Racing	Ford	36.313	148.707
Failed to qualify
39	53	Matt Mills (i)	Emerling-Gase Motorsports	Toyota	34.411	156.927
40	4	J. J. Yeley	JD Motorsports	Chevrolet	34.419	156.890
41	07	Natalie Decker	SS-Green Light Racing	Chevrolet	35.628	151.566
Official qualifying results
Official starting lineup

== Race results ==
Stage 1 Laps: 40

Pos.	#	Driver	Team	Make	Pts
1	00	Cole Custer (P)	Stewart–Haas Racing	Ford	10
2	1	Sam Mayer (P)	JR Motorsports	Chevrolet	9
3	20	John Hunter Nemechek (P)	Joe Gibbs Racing	Toyota	8
4	2	Sheldon Creed (P)	Richard Childress Racing	Chevrolet	7
5	25	Brett Moffitt	AM Racing	Ford	6
6	7	Justin Allgaier (P)	JR Motorsports	Chevrolet	5
7	98	Riley Herbst	Stewart–Haas Racing	Ford	4
8	21	Austin Hill (P)	Richard Childress Racing	Chevrolet	3
9	26	Kaz Grala	Sam Hunt Racing	Toyota	2
10	10	Daniel Hemric (OP)	Kaulig Racing	Chevrolet	1

Stage 2 Laps: 40

Pos.	#	Driver	Team	Make	Pts
1	11	Derek Kraus	Kaulig Racing	Chevrolet	10
2	20	John Hunter Nemechek (P)	Joe Gibbs Racing	Toyota	9
3	00	Cole Custer (P)	Stewart–Haas Racing	Ford	8
4	1	Sam Mayer (P)	JR Motorsports	Chevrolet	7
5	7	Justin Allgaier (P)	JR Motorsports	Chevrolet	6
6	48	Parker Kligerman	Big Machine Racing	Chevrolet	5
7	38	Kyle Sieg	RSS Racing	Ford	4
8	98	Riley Herbst	Stewart–Haas Racing	Ford	3
9	21	Austin Hill (P)	Richard Childress Racing	Chevrolet	2
10	10	Daniel Hemric (OP)	Kaulig Racing	Chevrolet	1

Stage 3 Laps: 120

Pos.	St	#	Driver	Team	Make	Laps	Led	Status	Pts
1	13	1	Sam Mayer (P)	JR Motorsports	Chevrolet	200	46	Running	56
2	7	98	Riley Herbst	Stewart–Haas Racing	Ford	200	0	Running	42
3	2	20	John Hunter Nemechek (P)	Joe Gibbs Racing	Toyota	200	7	Running	51
4	4	21	Austin Hill (P)	Richard Childress Racing	Chevrolet	200	0	Running	38
5	23	88	Dale Earnhardt Jr.	JR Motorsports	Chevrolet	200	0	Running	32
6	15	10	Daniel Hemric (OP)	Kaulig Racing	Chevrolet	200	0	Running	33
7	10	48	Parker Kligerman	Big Machine Racing	Chevrolet	200	0	Running	35
8	17	9	Brandon Jones	JR Motorsports	Chevrolet	200	0	Running	29
9	5	18	Sammy Smith (R) (P)	Joe Gibbs Racing	Toyota	200	0	Running	28
10	11	19	Joe Graf Jr.	Joe Gibbs Racing	Toyota	200	0	Running	27
11	20	11	Derek Kraus	Kaulig Racing	Chevrolet	200	21	Running	36
12	16	31	Parker Retzlaff (R)	Jordan Anderson Racing	Chevrolet	200	0	Running	25
13	1	00	Cole Custer (P)	Stewart–Haas Racing	Ford	199	114	Running	42
14	14	39	Ryan Sieg	RSS Racing	Ford	199	0	Running	23
15	3	7	Justin Allgaier (P)	JR Motorsports	Chevrolet	199	8	Running	33
16	18	91	Kyle Weatherman	DGM Racing	Chevrolet	199	0	Running	21
17	26	92	Josh Williams	DGM Racing	Chevrolet	199	0	Running	20
18	33	44	Jeffrey Earnhardt	Alpha Prime Racing	Chevrolet	199	0	Running	19
19	29	6	Brennan Poole	JD Motorsports	Chevrolet	199	0	Running	18
20	28	27	Jeb Burton	Jordan Anderson Racing	Chevrolet	199	0	Running	17
21	22	51	Jeremy Clements	Jeremy Clements Racing	Chevrolet	199	0	Running	16
22	25	38	Kyle Sieg	RSS Racing	Ford	199	0	Running	19
23	27	45	Leland Honeyman	Alpha Prime Racing	Chevrolet	199	0	Running	14
24	37	43	Ryan Ellis	Alpha Prime Racing	Chevrolet	199	0	Running	13
25	36	35	Patrick Emerling	Emerling-Gase Motorsports	Chevrolet	198	0	Running	12
26	9	2	Sheldon Creed (P)	Richard Childress Racing	Chevrolet	198	4	Running	18
27	35	08	Mason Massey	SS-Green Light Racing	Ford	198	0	Running	10
28	31	78	Anthony Alfredo	B. J. McLeod Motorsports	Chevrolet	197	0	Running	9
29	34	02	Blaine Perkins (R)	Our Motorsports	Chevrolet	196	0	Running	8
30	19	26	Kaz Grala	Sam Hunt Racing	Toyota	194	0	Running	9
31	21	24	Connor Mosack (R)	Sam Hunt Racing	Toyota	190	0	Electrical	6
32	8	8	Josh Berry	JR Motorsports	Chevrolet	171	0	Accident	5
33	30	29	Mason Maggio (i)	RSS Racing	Ford	153	0	Electrical	0
34	12	16	Chandler Smith (R) (P)	Kaulig Racing	Chevrolet	138	0	Engine	3
35	6	25	Brett Moffitt	AM Racing	Ford	97	0	Accident	8
36	32	74	Dawson Cram	CHK Racing	Chevrolet	65	0	Accident	1
37	38	28	C. J. McLaughlin	RSS Racing	Ford	37	0	Carburetor	1
38	24	66	Ryan Newman	MBM Motorsports	Ford	27	0	Rear Gear	1
Official race results

== Standings after the race ==
Drivers' Championship standings

	Pos	Driver	Points
	1	John Hunter Nemechek	3,154
2	2	Cole Custer	3,113 (-41)
	3	Austin Hill	3,113 (–41)
2	4	Sam Mayer	3,111 (–43)
3	5	Justin Allgaier	3,110 (–44)
1	6	Sammy Smith	3,064 (–90)
2	7	Chandler Smith	3,059 (–95)
	8	Sheldon Creed	3,048 (–106)
	9	Daniel Hemric	2,177 (–977)
	10	Parker Kligerman	2,161 (–993)
	11	Josh Berry	2,096 (–1,058)
	12	Jeb Burton	2,073 (–1,081)
Official driver's standings

- Note: Only the first 12 positions are included for the driver standings.

Previous race: 2023 Alsco Uniforms 302	NASCAR Xfinity Series; 2023 season	Next race: 2023 Dead On Tools 250
