= 2023 Andy's Frozen Custard 300 =

28th race of the 2023 NASCAR Xfinity Series

Race details
- Race 28 of 33 of the 2023 NASCAR Xfinity Series
- Date: September 23, 2023
- Official name: 19th Annual Andy's Frozen Custard 300
- Location: Texas Motor Speedway, Fort Worth, Texas
- Course: Permanent racing facility
- Course length: 1.5 miles (2.4 km)
- Distance: 200 laps, 300 mi (480 km)
- Scheduled distance: 200 laps, 300 mi (480 km)
- Average speed: 107.153 mph (172.446 km/h)

Pole position
Driver	Justin Allgaier	JR Motorsports
- Time: 29.188

Most laps led
Driver	Justin Allgaier	JR Motorsports
- Laps: 133

Winner
No. 20	John Hunter Nemechek	Joe Gibbs Racing

Television in the United States
- Network: USA
- Announcers: Rick Allen, Jeff Burton, Steve Letarte, and Dale Earnhardt Jr.

Radio in the United States
- Radio: PRN

The 2023 Andy's Frozen Custard 300 was the 28th stock car race of the 2023 NASCAR Xfinity Series, the second race of the Round of 12, and the 19th iteration of the event. The race was held on Saturday, September 23, 2023, in Fort Worth, Texas at Texas Motor Speedway, a 1.5 miles (2.4 km) permanent quad-oval shaped racetrack. The race took the scheduled 200 laps to complete. In a wild and wreck-filled race, John Hunter Nemechek, driving for Joe Gibbs Racing, would steal the win after making a pass on Parker Kligerman and Justin Allgaier with under ten laps to go, and held on to earn his 10th career NASCAR Xfinity Series win, and his seventh of the season. He would also advance into the next round of the playoffs. Allgaier would go on to have a blistering performance, winning both stages and leading a race-high 133 laps, but a late-race pass would put him in a 5th place finish. To fill out the podium, Kligerman, driving for Big Machine Racing, and Sammy Smith, driving for Joe Gibbs Racing, would finish 2nd and 3rd, respectively.

== Background ==
Texas Motor Speedway is a speedway located in the northernmost portion of the U.S. city of Fort Worth, Texas – the portion located in Denton County, Texas. The track measures 1.5 miles (2.4 km) around and is banked 24 degrees in the turns, and is of the oval design, where the front straightaway juts outward slightly. The track layout is similar to Atlanta Motor Speedway and Charlotte Motor Speedway (formerly Lowe's Motor Speedway). The track is owned by Speedway Motorsports, Inc., the same company that owns Atlanta and Charlotte Motor Speedway, as well as the short-track Bristol Motor Speedway.

=== Entry list ===
- (R) denotes rookie driver.
- (i) denotes driver who is ineligible for series driver points.
- (P) denotes playoff driver.

#	Driver	Team	Make
00	Cole Custer (P)	Stewart-Haas Racing	Ford
1	Sam Mayer (P)	JR Motorsports	Chevrolet
02	Blaine Perkins (R)	Our Motorsports	Chevrolet
2	Sheldon Creed (P)	Richard Childress Racing	Chevrolet
4	Garrett Smithley	JD Motorsports	Chevrolet
6	Brennan Poole	JD Motorsports	Chevrolet
07	David Starr	SS-Green Light Racing	Chevrolet
7	Justin Allgaier (P)	JR Motorsports	Chevrolet
08	J. J. Yeley	SS-Green Light Racing	Ford
8	Josh Berry (P)	JR Motorsports	Chevrolet
9	Brandon Jones	JR Motorsports	Chevrolet
10	Daniel Hemric (P)	Kaulig Racing	Chevrolet
11	Layne Riggs (i)	Kaulig Racing	Chevrolet
16	Chandler Smith (R) (P)	Kaulig Racing	Chevrolet
18	Sammy Smith (R) (P)	Joe Gibbs Racing	Toyota
19	Trevor Bayne	Joe Gibbs Racing	Toyota
20	John Hunter Nemechek (P)	Joe Gibbs Racing	Toyota
21	Austin Hill (P)	Richard Childress Racing	Chevrolet
24	Parker Chase	Sam Hunt Racing	Toyota
25	Brett Moffitt	AM Racing	Ford
26	Kaz Grala	Sam Hunt Racing	Toyota
27	Jeb Burton (P)	Jordan Anderson Racing	Chevrolet
28	C. J. McLaughlin	RSS Racing	Ford
29	Kyle Sieg	RSS Racing	Ford
31	Parker Retzlaff (R)	Jordan Anderson Racing	Chevrolet
35	Joey Gase	Emerling-Gase Motorsports	Toyota
38	Joe Graf Jr.	RSS Racing	Ford
39	Ryan Sieg	RSS Racing	Ford
43	Ryan Ellis	Alpha Prime Racing	Chevrolet
44	Daniel Dye (i)	Alpha Prime Racing	Chevrolet
45	Jeffrey Earnhardt	Alpha Prime Racing	Chevrolet
48	Parker Kligerman (P)	Big Machine Racing	Chevrolet
51	Jeremy Clements	Jeremy Clements Racing	Chevrolet
53	Patrick Emerling	Emerling-Gase Motorsports	Chevrolet
66	Sage Karam	MBM Motorsports	Ford
74	Dawson Cram	CHK Racing	Chevrolet
78	Anthony Alfredo	B. J. McLeod Motorsports	Chevrolet
91	Kyle Weatherman	DGM Racing	Chevrolet
92	Josh Williams	DGM Racing	Chevrolet
98	Riley Herbst	Stewart-Haas Racing	Ford
Official entry list

== Practice ==
The first and only practice session was held on Saturday, September 23, at 9:35 AM CST, and would last for 20 minutes. Justin Allgaier, driving for JR Motorsports, would set the fastest time in the session, with a lap of 29.678, and an average speed of 181.953 mph (292.825 km/h).

Pos.	#	Driver	Team	Make	Time	Speed
1	7	Justin Allgaier (P)	JR Motorsports	Chevrolet	29.678	181.953
2	8	Josh Berry (P)	JR Motorsports	Chevrolet	29.778	181.342
3	19	Trevor Bayne	Joe Gibbs Racing	Toyota	29.820	181.087
Full practice results

== Qualifying ==
Qualifying was held on Saturday, September 23, at 10:05 AM CST. Since Texas Motor Speedway is an intermediate racetrack, the qualifying system used is a single-car, one-lap system with only one round. In that round, whoever sets the fastest time will win the pole. Justin Allgaier, driving for JR Motorsports, would score the pole for the race, with a lap of 29.188, and an average speed of 185.008 mph (297.742 km/h).

Pos.	#	Driver	Team	Make	Time	Speed
1	7	Justin Allgaier (P)	JR Motorsports	Chevrolet	29.188	185.008
2	19	Trevor Bayne	Joe Gibbs Racing	Toyota	29.202	184.919
3	00	Cole Custer (P)	Stewart-Haas Racing	Ford	29.303	184.281
4	8	Josh Berry (P)	JR Motorsports	Chevrolet	29.319	184.181
5	21	Austin Hill (P)	Richard Childress Racing	Chevrolet	29.335	184.080
6	1	Sam Mayer (P)	JR Motorsports	Chevrolet	29.362	183.911
7	48	Parker Kligerman (P)	Big Machine Racing	Chevrolet	29.380	183.799
8	9	Brandon Jones	JR Motorsports	Chevrolet	29.450	183.362
9	16	Chandler Smith (R) (P)	Kaulig Racing	Chevrolet	29.483	183.156
10	98	Riley Herbst	Stewart-Haas Racing	Ford	29.511	182.983
11	20	John Hunter Nemechek	Joe Gibbs Racing	Toyota	29.635	182.217
12	91	Kyle Weatherman	DGM Racing	Chevrolet	29.639	182.192
13	10	Daniel Hemric (P)	Kaulig Racing	Chevrolet	29.644	182.162
14	51	Jeremy Clements	Jeremy Clements Racing	Chevrolet	29.644	182.162
15	18	Sammy Smith (R) (P)	Joe Gibbs Racing	Toyota	29.704	181.794
16	26	Kaz Grala	Sam Hunt Racing	Toyota	29.825	181.056
17	39	Ryan Sieg	RSS Racing	Ford	29.948	180.313
18	31	Parker Retzlaff (R)	Jordan Anderson Racing	Chevrolet	29.978	180.132
19	29	Kyle Sieg	RSS Racing	Ford	30.050	179.700
20	66	Sage Karam	MBM Motorsports	Ford	30.077	179.539
21	6	Brennan Poole	JD Motorsports	Chevrolet	30.090	179.462
22	25	Brett Moffitt	AM Racing	Ford	30.104	179.378
23	92	Josh Williams	DGM Racing	Chevrolet	30.190	178.867
24	2	Sheldon Creed (P)	Richard Childress Racing	Chevrolet	30.210	178.749
25	74	Dawson Cram	CHK Racing	Chevrolet	30.210	178.749
26	44	Daniel Dye (i)	Alpha Prime Racing	Chevrolet	30.254	178.489
27	35	Joey Gase	Emerling-Gase Motorsports	Toyota	30.276	178.359
28	27	Jeb Burton (P)	Jordan Anderson Racing	Chevrolet	30.294	178.253
29	53	Patrick Emerling	Emerling-Gase Motorsports	Chevrolet	30.303	178.200
30	43	Ryan Ellis	Alpha Prime Racing	Chevrolet	30.336	178.006
31	08	J. J. Yeley	SS-Green Light Racing	Ford	30.360	177.866
32	07	David Starr	SS-Green Light Racing	Chevrolet	30.425	177.486
33	78	Anthony Alfredo	B. J. McLeod Motorsports	Chevrolet	30.433	177.439
Qualified by owner's points
34	45	Jeffrey Earnhardt	Alpha Prime Racing	Chevrolet	30.578	176.598
35	38	Joe Graf Jr.	RSS Racing	Ford	30.649	176.188
36	24	Parker Chase	Sam Hunt Racing	Toyota	31.125	173.494
37	28	C. J. McLaughlin	RSS Racing	Ford	31.193	174.116
38	11	Layne Riggs (i)	Kaulig Racing	Chevrolet	–	–
Failed to qualify
39	4	Garrett Smithley	JD Motorsports	Chevrolet	30.688	175.965
40	02	Blaine Perkins (R)	Our Motorsports	Chevrolet	30.711	175.833
Official qualifying results
Official starting lineup

== Race results ==
Stage 1 Laps: 65

Pos.	#	Driver	Team	Make	Pts
1	7	Justin Allgaier (P)	JR Motorsports	Chevrolet	10
2	21	Austin Hill (P)	Richard Childress Racing	Chevrolet	9
3	00	Cole Custer (P)	Stewart-Haas Racing	Ford	8
4	19	Trevor Bayne	Joe Gibbs Racing	Toyota	7
5	20	John Hunter Nemechek (P)	Joe Gibbs Racing	Toyota	6
6	9	Brandon Jones	JR Motorsports	Chevrolet	5
7	48	Parker Kligerman (P)	Big Machine Racing	Chevrolet	4
8	8	Josh Berry (P)	JR Motorsports	Chevrolet	3
9	18	Sammy Smith (R) (P)	Joe Gibbs Racing	Toyota	2
10	16	Chandler Smith (R) (P)	Kaulig Racing	Chevrolet	1

Stage 2 Laps: 65

Pos.	#	Driver	Team	Make	Pts
1	7	Justin Allgaier (P)	JR Motorsports	Chevrolet	10
2	00	Cole Custer (P)	Stewart-Haas Racing	Ford	9
3	21	Austin Hill (P)	Richard Childress Racing	Chevrolet	8
4	20	John Hunter Nemechek (P)	Joe Gibbs Racing	Toyota	7
5	19	Trevor Bayne	Joe Gibbs Racing	Toyota	6
6	8	Josh Berry (P)	JR Motorsports	Chevrolet	5
7	16	Chandler Smith (R) (P)	Kaulig Racing	Chevrolet	4
8	48	Parker Kligerman (P)	Big Machine Racing	Chevrolet	3
9	9	Brandon Jones	JR Motorsports	Chevrolet	2
10	18	Sammy Smith (R) (P)	Joe Gibbs Racing	Toyota	1

Stage 3 Laps: 70

Pos.	St	#	Driver	Team	Make	Laps	Led	Status	Pts
1	11	20	John Hunter Nemechek (P)	Joe Gibbs Racing	Toyota	200	38	Running	53
2	7	48	Parker Kligerman (P)	Big Machine Racing	Chevrolet	200	1	Running	42
3	15	18	Sammy Smith (R) (P)	Joe Gibbs Racing	Toyota	200	0	Running	37
4	9	16	Chandler Smith (R) (P)	Kaulig Racing	Chevrolet	200	0	Running	38
5	1	7	Justin Allgaier (P)	JR Motorsports	Chevrolet	200	133	Running	52
6	3	00	Cole Custer (P)	Stewart-Haas Racing	Ford	200	28	Running	48
7	5	21	Austin Hill (P)	Richard Childress Racing	Chevrolet	200	0	Running	47
8	24	2	Sheldon Creed (P)	Richard Childress Racing	Chevrolet	200	0	Running	29
9	8	9	Brandon Jones	JR Motorsports	Chevrolet	200	0	Running	35
10	22	25	Brett Moffitt	AM Racing	Ford	200	0	Running	27
11	17	39	Ryan Sieg	RSS Racing	Ford	200	0	Running	26
12	19	29	Kyle Sieg	RSS Racing	Ford	200	0	Running	25
13	30	43	Ryan Ellis	Alpha Prime Racing	Chevrolet	200	0	Running	24
14	33	78	Anthony Alfredo	B. J. McLeod Motorsports	Chevrolet	200	0	Running	23
15	12	91	Kyle Weatherman	DGM Racing	Chevrolet	200	0	Running	22
16	36	24	Parker Chase	Sam Hunt Racing	Toyota	199	0	Running	21
17	26	44	Daniel Dye (i)	Alpha Prime Racing	Chevrolet	199	0	Running	0
18	14	51	Jeremy Clements	Jeremy Clements Racing	Chevrolet	199	0	Running	19
19	38	11	Layne Riggs (i)	Kaulig Racing	Chevrolet	198	0	Running	0
20	23	92	Josh Williams (Note: After inhaling fumes due to a hole in Josh Williams' A/C hose, he would be replaced by Stefan Parsons mid-race. Since Williams started the race, he is officially credited with a 20th place finish.)	DGM Racing	Chevrolet	198	0	Running	17
21	25	74	Dawson Cram	CHK Racing	Chevrolet	198	0	Running	16
22	32	07	David Starr	SS-Green Light Racing	Chevrolet	197	0	Running	15
23	20	66	Sage Karam	MBM Motorsports	Ford	197	0	Running	14
24	13	10	Daniel Hemric (P)	Kaulig Racing	Chevrolet	195	0	Accident	13
25	37	28	C. J. McLaughlin	RSS Racing	Ford	195	0	Running	12
26	27	35	Joey Gase	Emerling-Gase Motorsports	Toyota	194	0	Running	11
27	4	8	Josh Berry (P)	JR Motorsports	Chevrolet	193	0	Running	18
28	31	08	J. J. Yeley	SS-Green Light Racing	Ford	183	0	Accident	9
29	16	26	Kaz Grala	Sam Hunt Racing	Toyota	183	0	Accident	8
30	18	31	Parker Retzlaff (R)	Jordan Anderson Racing	Chevrolet	108	0	Accident	7
31	28	27	Jeb Burton (P)	Jordan Anderson Racing	Chevrolet	108	0	Suspension	6
32	34	45	Jeffrey Earnhardt	Alpha Prime Racing	Chevrolet	106	0	Accident	5
33	2	19	Trevor Bayne	Joe Gibbs Racing	Toyota	97	0	Accident	17
34	21	6	Brennan Poole	JD Motorsports	Chevrolet	55	0	Accident	3
35	29	53	Patrick Emerling	Emerling-Gase Motorsports	Chevrolet	24	0	Suspension	2
36	35	38	Joe Graf Jr.	RSS Racing	Ford	11	0	DVP	1
37	10	98	Riley Herbst	Stewart-Haas Racing	Ford	2	0	Accident	1
38	6	1	Sam Mayer (P)	JR Motorsports	Chevrolet	0	0	Accident	1
Official race results

== Standings after the race ==
Drivers' Championship standings

	Pos	Driver	Points
	1	John Hunter Nemechek	2,148
	2	Justin Allgaier	2,137 (-11)
	3	Cole Custer	2,117 (–31)
	4	Austin Hill	2,098 (–50)
	5	Chandler Smith	2,086 (–62)
1	6	Sammy Smith	2,072 (–76)
1	7	Sheldon Creed	2,063 (–85)
2	8	Daniel Hemric	2,055 (–93)
2	9	Parker Kligerman	2,054 (–94)
1	10	Jeb Burton	2,036 (–112)
1	11	Josh Berry	2,028 (–120)
2	12	Sam Mayer	2,021 (–127)
Official driver's standings

- Note: Only the first 12 positions are included for the driver standings.

Previous race: 2023 Food City 300	NASCAR Xfinity Series; 2023 season	Next race: 2023 Drive for the Cure 250
