= 2023 Sport Clips Haircuts VFW 200 =

25th race of the 2023 NASCAR Xfinity Series

Race details
- Race 25 of 33 of the 2023 NASCAR Xfinity Series
- Date: September 2, 2023
- Official name: 41st Annual Sport Clips Haircuts VFW Help a Hero 200
- Location: Darlington Raceway, Darlington, South Carolina
- Course: Permanent racing facility
- Course length: 1.366 miles (2.198 km)
- Distance: 148 laps, 202 mi (325 km)
- Scheduled distance: 147 laps, 200 mi (323 km)
- Average speed: 106.826 mph (171.920 km/h)

Pole position
Driver	John Hunter Nemechek	Joe Gibbs Racing
- Time: 29.804

Most laps led
Driver	John Hunter Nemechek	Joe Gibbs Racing
- Laps: 99

Winner
No. 19	Denny Hamlin	Joe Gibbs Racing

Television in the United States
- Network: USA
- Announcers: Rick Allen, Jeff Burton, Steve Letarte, and Dale Earnhardt Jr.

Radio in the United States
- Radio: MRN

The 2023 Sport Clips Haircuts VFW Help a Hero 200 was the 25th stock car race of the 2023 NASCAR Xfinity Series, and the 41st iteration of the event. The race was held on Saturday, September 2, 2023, in Darlington, South Carolina at Darlington Raceway, a 1.366 miles (2.198 km) permanent egg-shaped racetrack. The race was scheduled to be contested over 147 laps, but was extended to 148 laps due to NASCAR overtime finish. Denny Hamlin, driving for Joe Gibbs Racing, would pull away with the lead on the final restart, and held off Austin Hill to earn his 18th career NASCAR Xfinity Series win, and his first of the season. John Hunter Nemechek, who finished in 3rd, would dominate the majority of the race, winning both stages and leading a race-high 99 laps. To fill out the podium, Hill, driving for Richard Childress Racing, and Nemechek, driving for Joe Gibbs Racing, would finish 2nd and 3rd, respectively.

== Background ==
Darlington Raceway is a race track built for NASCAR racing located near Darlington, South Carolina. It is nicknamed "The Lady in Black" and "The Track Too Tough to Tame" by many NASCAR fans and drivers and advertised as "A NASCAR Tradition." It is of a unique, somewhat egg-shaped design, an oval with the ends of very different configurations, a condition which supposedly arose from the proximity of one end of the track to a minnow pond the owner refused to relocate. This situation makes it very challenging for the crews to set up their cars' handling in a way that is effective at both ends.

=== Surface Issues ===
Darlington Raceway was last repaved following the May 2007 meeting (from 2005 to 2019, there was only one meeting; the second meeting was reinstated in 2020), and from 2008 to 2019, there was one night race. In 2020, a day race returned to the schedule, and instead of two races (one Xfinity and one Cup) during the entire year, the track hosted six races (three Cup, two Xfinity, and one Truck). The circuit kept repairing the circuit with patches during each summer before the annual Cup race in September. The circuit's narrow Turn 2 rapidly deteriorated with cracks in the tarmac allowing water to seep in the circuit. In July 2021, the circuit repaved a six hundred foot section at the entrance of Turn 2 and ending at the exit of the turn to repair the tarmac and resolve the issue for safety and to reduce the threat of weepers and surface issues in that section of the circuit.

=== Entry list ===
- (R) denotes rookie driver.
- (i) denotes driver who is ineligible for series driver points.

#	Driver	Team	Make
00	Cole Custer	Stewart-Haas Racing	Ford
1	Sam Mayer	JR Motorsports	Chevrolet
02	Blaine Perkins (R)	Our Motorsports	Chevrolet
2	Sheldon Creed	Richard Childress Racing	Chevrolet
4	Kyle Weatherman	JD Motorsports	Chevrolet
6	Brennan Poole	JD Motorsports	Chevrolet
07	Stefan Parsons	SS-Green Light Racing	Chevrolet
7	Justin Allgaier	JR Motorsports	Chevrolet
08	Chad Finchum	SS-Green Light Racing	Ford
8	Josh Berry	JR Motorsports	Chevrolet
9	Brandon Jones	JR Motorsports	Chevrolet
10	Kyle Busch (i)	Kaulig Racing	Chevrolet
11	Daniel Hemric	Kaulig Racing	Chevrolet
16	Chandler Smith (R)	Kaulig Racing	Chevrolet
17	Kyle Larson (i)	Hendrick Motorsports	Chevrolet
18	Sammy Smith (R)	Joe Gibbs Racing	Toyota
19	Denny Hamlin (i)	Joe Gibbs Racing	Toyota
20	John Hunter Nemechek	Joe Gibbs Racing	Toyota
21	Austin Hill	Richard Childress Racing	Chevrolet
24	Corey Heim (i)	Sam Hunt Racing	Toyota
25	Brett Moffitt	AM Racing	Ford
26	Kaz Grala	Sam Hunt Racing	Toyota
27	Jeb Burton	Jordan Anderson Racing	Chevrolet
28	Kyle Sieg	RSS Racing	Ford
31	Parker Retzlaff (R)	Jordan Anderson Racing	Chevrolet
35	Patrick Emerling	Emerling-Gase Motorsports	Chevrolet
38	Joe Graf Jr.	RSS Racing	Ford
39	Ryan Sieg	RSS Racing	Ford
43	Ryan Ellis	Alpha Prime Racing	Chevrolet
44	Dawson Cram	Alpha Prime Racing	Chevrolet
45	Rajah Caruth (i)	Alpha Prime Racing	Chevrolet
48	Parker Kligerman	Big Machine Racing	Chevrolet
51	Jeremy Clements	Jeremy Clements Racing	Chevrolet
53	Matt Mills (i)	Emerling-Gase Motorsports	Toyota
66	Timmy Hill (i)	MBM Motorsports	Ford
78	Anthony Alfredo	B. J. McLeod Motorsports	Chevrolet
91	Ross Chastain (i)	DGM Racing	Chevrolet
92	Josh Williams	DGM Racing	Chevrolet
98	Riley Herbst	Stewart-Haas Racing	Ford
Official entry list

== Practice ==
The first and only practice session was held on Saturday, September 2, at 10:35 AM EST, and would last for 20 minutes. Daniel Hemric, driving for Kaulig Racing, would set the fastest time in the session, with a lap of 29.672, and an average speed of 165.732 mph (266.720 km/h).

Pos.	#	Driver	Team	Make	Time	Speed
1	11	Daniel Hemric	Kaulig Racing	Chevrolet	29.672	165.732
2	48	Parker Kligerman	Big Machine Racing	Chevrolet	30.030	163.756
3	8	Josh Berry	JR Motorsports	Chevrolet	30.129	163.218
Full practice results

== Qualifying ==
Qualifying was held on Saturday, September 2, at 11:05 AM EST. Since Darlington Raceway is an intermediate racetrack, the qualifying system used is a single-car, one-lap system with only one round. In that round, whoever sets the fastest time will win the pole. John Hunter Nemechek, driving for Joe Gibbs Racing, would score the pole for the race, with a lap of 29.804, and an average speed of 164.998 mph (265.539 km/h).

Pos.	#	Driver	Team	Make	Time	Speed
1	20	John Hunter Nemechek	Joe Gibbs Racing	Toyota	29.804	164.998
2	19	Denny Hamlin (i)	Joe Gibbs Racing	Toyota	29.813	164.948
3	7	Justin Allgaier	JR Motorsports	Chevrolet	29.893	164.507
4	00	Cole Custer	Stewart-Haas Racing	Ford	29.898	164.479
5	1	Sam Mayer	JR Motorsports	Chevrolet	29.926	164.325
6	11	Daniel Hemric	Kaulig Racing	Chevrolet	29.953	164.177
7	8	Josh Berry	JR Motorsports	Chevrolet	30.049	163.653
8	9	Brandon Jones	JR Motorsports	Chevrolet	30.062	163.582
9	21	Austin Hill	Richard Childress Racing	Chevrolet	30.066	163.560
10	16	Chandler Smith (R)	Kaulig Racing	Chevrolet	30.085	163.457
11	18	Sammy Smith (R)	Joe Gibbs Racing	Toyota	30.086	163.451
12	17	Kyle Larson (i)	Hendrick Motorsports	Chevrolet	30.112	163.310
13	48	Parker Kligerman	Big Machine Racing	Chevrolet	30.115	163.294
14	10	Kyle Busch (i)	Kaulig Racing	Chevrolet	30.132	163.202
15	98	Riley Herbst	Stewart-Haas Racing	Ford	30.133	163.196
16	2	Sheldon Creed	Richard Childress Racing	Chevrolet	30.136	163.180
17	24	Corey Heim (i)	Sam Hunt Racing	Toyota	30.218	162.737
18	25	Brett Moffitt	AM Racing	Ford	30.290	162.351
19	31	Parker Retzlaff (R)	Jordan Anderson Racing	Chevrolet	30.309	162.249
20	39	Ryan Sieg	RSS Racing	Ford	30.388	161.827
21	91	Ross Chastain (i)	DGM Racing	Chevrolet	30.448	161.508
22	45	Rajah Caruth (i)	Alpha Prime Racing	Chevrolet	30.479	161.344
23	78	Anthony Alfredo	B. J. McLeod Motorsports	Chevrolet	30.512	161.169
24	27	Jeb Burton	Jordan Anderson Racing	Chevrolet	30.533	161.059
25	28	Kyle Sieg	RSS Racing	Ford	30.620	160.601
26	51	Jeremy Clements	Jeremy Clements Racing	Chevrolet	30.631	160.543
27	07	Stefan Parsons	SS-Green Light Racing	Chevrolet	30.706	160.151
28	4	Kyle Weatherman	JD Motorsports	Chevrolet	30.772	159.808
29	66	Timmy Hill (i)	MBM Motorsports	Ford	30.785	159.740
30	26	Kaz Grala	Sam Hunt Racing	Toyota	30.790	159.714
31	6	Brennan Poole	JD Motorsports	Chevrolet	30.799	159.668
32	53	Matt Mills (i)	Emerling-Gase Motorsports	Toyota	30.803	159.647
33	08	Chad Finchum	SS-Green Light Racing	Ford	30.852	159.393
Qualified by owner's points
34	38	Joe Graf Jr.	RSS Racing	Ford	30.878	159.259
35	02	Blaine Perkins (R)	Our Motorsports	Chevrolet	30.883	159.233
36	43	Ryan Ellis	Alpha Prime Racing	Chevrolet	30.922	159.032
37	92	Josh Williams	DGM Racing	Chevrolet	31.229	157.469
38	35	Patrick Emerling	Emerling-Gase Motorsports	Chevrolet	31.744	154.914
Failed to qualify
39	44	Dawson Cram	Alpha Prime Racing	Chevrolet	30.942	158.930
Official qualifying results
Official starting lineup

== Race results ==
Stage 1 Laps: 45

Pos.	#	Driver	Team	Make	Pts
1	20	John Hunter Nemechek	Joe Gibbs Racing	Toyota	10
2	19	Denny Hamlin (i)	Joe Gibbs Racing	Toyota	0
3	17	Kyle Larson (i)	Hendrick Motorsports	Chevrolet	0
4	7	Justin Allgaier	JR Motorsports	Chevrolet	7
5	00	Cole Custer	Stewart-Haas Racing	Ford	6
6	21	Austin Hill	Richard Childress Racing	Chevrolet	5
7	11	Daniel Hemric	Kaulig Racing	Chevrolet	4
8	10	Kyle Busch (i)	Kaulig Racing	Chevrolet	0
9	16	Chandler Smith (R)	Kaulig Racing	Chevrolet	2
10	98	Riley Herbst	Stewart-Haas Racing	Ford	1

Stage 2 Laps: 45

Pos.	#	Driver	Team	Make	Pts
1	20	John Hunter Nemechek	Joe Gibbs Racing	Toyota	10
2	21	Austin Hill	Richard Childress Racing	Chevrolet	9
3	17	Kyle Larson (i)	Hendrick Motorsports	Chevrolet	0
4	19	Denny Hamlin (i)	Joe Gibbs Racing	Toyota	0
5	7	Justin Allgaier	JR Motorsports	Chevrolet	6
6	00	Cole Custer	Stewart-Haas Racing	Ford	5
7	16	Chandler Smith (R)	Kaulig Racing	Chevrolet	4
8	31	Parker Retzlaff (R)	Jordan Anderson Racing	Chevrolet	3
9	98	Riley Herbst	Stewart-Haas Racing	Ford	2
10	11	Daniel Hemric	Kaulig Racing	Chevrolet	1

Stage 3 Laps: 58

Pos.	St	#	Driver	Team	Make	Laps	Led	Status	Pts
1	2	19	Denny Hamlin (i)	Joe Gibbs Racing	Toyota	148	14	Running	0
2	9	21	Austin Hill	Richard Childress Racing	Chevrolet	148	29	Running	49
3	1	20	John Hunter Nemechek	Joe Gibbs Racing	Toyota	148	99	Running	54
4	4	00	Cole Custer	Stewart-Haas Racing	Ford	148	0	Running	44
5	7	8	Josh Berry	JR Motorsports	Chevrolet	148	0	Running	32
6	15	98	Riley Herbst	Stewart-Haas Racing	Ford	148	0	Running	34
7	3	7	Justin Allgaier	JR Motorsports	Chevrolet	148	0	Running	43
8	16	2	Sheldon Creed	Richard Childress Racing	Chevrolet	148	0	Running	29
9	14	10	Kyle Busch (i)	Kaulig Racing	Chevrolet	148	0	Running	0
10	6	11	Daniel Hemric	Kaulig Racing	Chevrolet	148	0	Running	32
11	5	1	Sam Mayer	JR Motorsports	Chevrolet	148	0	Running	26
12	10	16	Chandler Smith (R)	Kaulig Racing	Chevrolet	148	0	Running	31
13	19	31	Parker Retzlaff (R)	Jordan Anderson Racing	Chevrolet	148	5	Running	27
14	8	9	Brandon Jones	JR Motorsports	Chevrolet	148	0	Running	23
15	17	24	Corey Heim (i)	Sam Hunt Racing	Toyota	148	0	Running	0
16	22	45	Rajah Caruth (i)	Alpha Prime Racing	Chevrolet	148	0	Running	0
17	11	18	Sammy Smith (R)	Joe Gibbs Racing	Toyota	148	0	Running	20
18	24	27	Jeb Burton	Jordan Anderson Racing	Chevrolet	148	0	Running	19
19	27	07	Stefan Parsons	SS-Green Light Racing	Chevrolet	148	0	Running	18
20	31	6	Brennan Poole	JD Motorsports	Chevrolet	148	0	Running	17
21	26	51	Jeremy Clements	Jeremy Clements Racing	Chevrolet	148	0	Running	16
22	33	08	Chad Finchum	SS-Green Light Racing	Ford	148	0	Running	15
23	21	91	Ross Chastain (i)	DGM Racing	Chevrolet	148	0	Running	0
24	13	48	Parker Kligerman	Big Machine Racing	Chevrolet	148	0	Running	13
25	18	25	Brett Moffitt	AM Racing	Ford	148	0	Running	12
26	34	38	Joe Graf Jr.	RSS Racing	Ford	148	0	Running	11
27	32	53	Matt Mills (i)	Emerling-Gase Motorsports	Toyota	148	0	Running	0
28	30	26	Kaz Grala	Sam Hunt Racing	Toyota	148	0	Running	9
29	36	43	Ryan Ellis	Alpha Prime Racing	Chevrolet	148	0	Running	8
30	20	39	Ryan Sieg	RSS Racing	Ford	148	0	Running	7
31	28	4	Kyle Weatherman	JD Motorsports	Chevrolet	148	0	Running	6
32	29	66	Timmy Hill (i)	MBM Motorsports	Ford	148	0	Running	0
33	23	78	Anthony Alfredo	B. J. McLeod Motorsports	Chevrolet	147	0	Running	4
34	35	02	Blaine Perkins (R)	Our Motorsports	Chevrolet	147	0	Running	3
35	25	28	Kyle Sieg	RSS Racing	Ford	147	0	Running	2
36	38	35	Patrick Emerling	Emerling-Gase Motorsports	Chevrolet	145	0	Running	1
37	37	92	Josh Williams	DGM Racing	Chevrolet	143	0	Running	1
38	12	17	Kyle Larson (i)	Hendrick Motorsports	Chevrolet	117	1	Running	0
Official race results

== Standings after the race ==
Drivers' Championship standings

	Pos	Driver	Points
	1	Austin Hill	968
1	2	John Hunter Nemechek	945 (-23)
1	3	Justin Allgaier	935 (–33)
	4	Cole Custer	861 (–107)
	5	Sam Mayer	781 (–187)
	6	Josh Berry	765 (–203)
	7	Sheldon Creed	712 (–256)
	8	Daniel Hemric	711 (–257)
	9	Chandler Smith	706 (–262)
1	10	Riley Herbst	657 (–311)
1	11	Parker Kligerman	656 (–312)
	12	Sammy Smith	629 (–339)
Official driver's standings

- Note: Only the first 12 positions are included for the driver standings.

Previous race: 2023 Wawa 250	NASCAR Xfinity Series; 2023 season	Next race: 2023 Kansas Lottery 300
