= Alpha Prime Racing =

American stock car racing team

- Owners: Craig Martins; Tommy Joe Martins; Caesar Bacarella
- Principal: Jusan Hamilton (President)
- Base: Mooresville, North Carolina
- Series: NASCAR O'Reilly Auto Parts Series
- Race drivers: 4. Anthony Alfredo, Caesar Bacarella (part-time); 44. Brennan Poole; 45. Lavar Scott (R)
- Manufacturer: Ford
- Opened: 2009

Career
- Debut: O'Reilly Auto Parts Series: 2014 Blue Jeans Go Green 200 (Phoenix); Truck Series: 2009 AAA Insurance 200 (Lucas Oil Indianapolis Raceway Park); ARCA Racing Series: 2010 Lucas Oil Slick Mist 200 (Daytona)
- Latest race: O'Reilly Auto Parts Series: 2026 O'Reilly Auto Parts 300 (Homestead); Truck Series: 2017 Ford EcoBoost 200 (Homestead); ARCA Racing Series: 2011 Lucas Oil Slick Mist 200 (Daytona)
- Races competed: Total: 283; O'Reilly Auto Parts Series: 240; Truck Series: 41; ARCA Racing Series: 2
- Drivers' Championships: Total: 0 O'Reilly Auto Parts Series: 0 Truck Series: 0 ARCA Racing Series: 0
- Race victories: Total: 0 O'Reilly Auto Parts Series: 0 Truck Series: 0 ARCA Racing Series: 0
- Pole positions: Total: 0 O'Reilly Auto Parts Series: 0 Truck Series: 0 ARCA Racing Series: 0

Alpha Prime Racing (formerly Martins Motorsports) is an American professional stock car racing team that competes in the NASCAR O'Reilly Auto Parts Series. Founded in 2009 by Craig Martins, the team is co-owned by Martins and Caesar Bacarella, and currently fields two full-time Ford Mustang Dark Horses, including the No. 44 driven by Ryan Ellis and the No. 45 driven by Lavar Scott, as well as the No. 4 part-time driven by Bacarella and Anthony Alfredo.

== History ==
Team logo as Martins Motorsports

The team was founded in 2009 as Martins Motorsports for owner Tommy Joe Martins.

In 2017, following reports that longtime crew chief Kevin Eagle had left the team, primary driver and owner Tommy Joe Martins took to Twitter, Periscope and the media to announce the team's closure in late December 2017. The team had plans to compete in a full 2018 NASCAR Camping World Truck Series schedule; however, two drivers signed to drive on handshake deals failed to follow through, leaving the team's financial security in doubt. Tommy Joe, commenting on the situation, noted the irony of the situation that the team had been founded as an underdog, family team and now had to rely on pay drivers to survive, the antithesis of what the team was founded on. Once those drivers with sponsors backed out, Martins said that his family was unwilling to take the $300,000 or $400,000 loss that the team took in 2017. At different points, he called the decision "hard" to give up on a dream, yet "easy" to make financially. He also did not rule out a return to the Xfinity Series but the return did not seem likely at the time of closure. Martins later disclosed that the team had approached Ford Performance to become a partner team but that the manufacturer turned the team down.

The team was inactive from 2018 to 2019, and in 2022 the team rebranded as Alpha Prime Racing and has since expanded operations and driver lineup.

On September 5, 2026, it was announced that the team would switch manufacturers from Chevrolet to Ford beginning the following week at Gateway.

== O'Reilly Auto Parts Series ==
=== Car No. 4 history ===
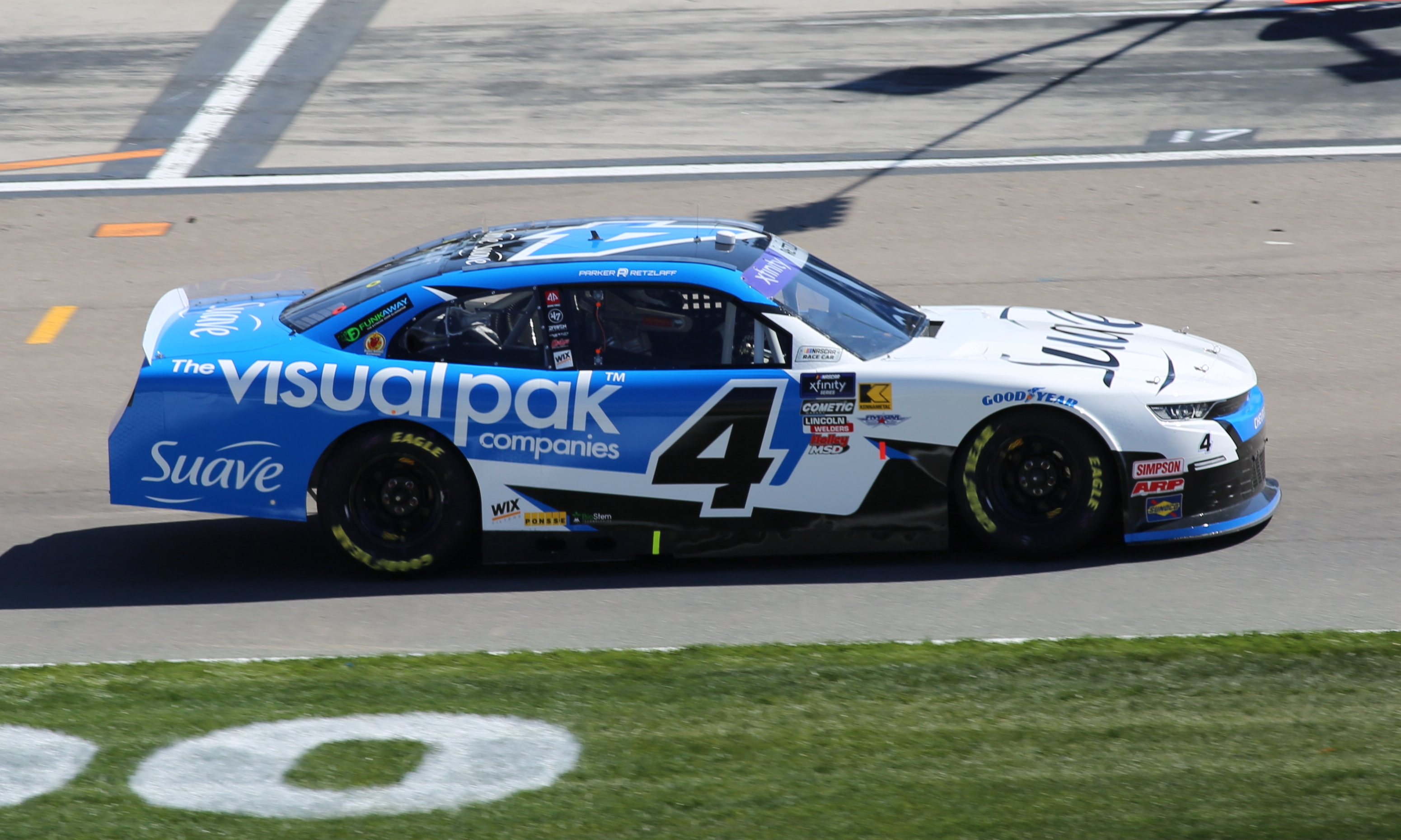
Parker Retzlaff in the No. 4 car at Las Vegas Motor Speedway in 2025

On December 18, 2024, it was announced that the No. 43 team would be renumbered to the No. 4, with newcomer Parker Retzlaff announced as the driver for 2025. On April 19, 2025 at Rockingham, Retzlaff scored the team's best finish with a third place finish, also tying his own best finish in an NXS race. However, just hours later, race winner Jesse Love was disqualified in post race inspection, bringing Retzlaff's finish to second place, now overtaking the 2024 season opener as the best finish in his Xfinity Series career.

On January 28, 2026, it was announced that Caesar Bacarella would compete in the season-opening United Rentals 300 at Daytona International Speedway, driving the No. 4 entry. Bacarella qualified 26th but gave up his seat to full-time driver Anthony Alfredo, who was not fast enough in qualifying to make the race on speed. Bacarella would also drive the No. 4 at summer Daytona race and fall Talladega race.

==== Car No. 4 results ====
| Year | Driver | No. | Make | 1 | 2 | 3 | 4 | 5 | 6 | 7 | 8 | 9 | 10 | 11 | 12 | 13 | 14 | 15 | 16 | 17 | 18 | 19 | 20 | 21 | 22 | 23 | 24 | 25 | 26 | 27 | 28 | 29 | 30 | 31 | 32 | 33 | Owners | Pts |
|---|---|---|---|---|---|---|---|---|---|---|---|---|---|---|---|---|---|---|---|---|---|---|---|---|---|---|---|---|---|---|---|---|---|---|---|---|---|---|
| 2025 | Parker Retzlaff | 4 | Chevy | DAY; 29 | ATL; 27 | COA; DNQ | PHO; 11 | LVS; 21 | HOM; 17 | MAR; 12 | DAR; 20 | BRI; 18 | CAR; 2 | TAL; 38 | TEX; 14 | CLT; 37 | NSH; 37 | MXC; 35 | POC; 22 | ATL; 36 | CSC; 24 | SON; 28 | DOV; 19 | IND; 14 | IOW; 13 | GLN; 22 | DAY; 38 | PIR; 30 | GTW; 8 | BRI; 16 | KAN; 27 | ROV; 16 | LVS; 30 | TAL; 7 | MAR; 29 | PHO; 27 | 22nd | 479 |
| 2026 | Caesar Bacarella | 4 | Chevy | DAY; QL^{‡} | ATL | COA | PHO | LVS | DAR | MAR | ROC | BRI | KAN | TAL | TEX | GLN | DOV | CLT | NSS | POC | COR | SON | CHI | ATL | IND | IOW | DAY; 31 | DAR | GTW | BRI | LVS | CLT | PHO | TAL; 37 | MAR | HOM | 48th | 7 |
| 2026 | Anthony Alfredo | 4 | Chevy | DAY; 11 | | | | | | | | | | | | | | | | | | | | | | | | | | | | | | | | | 48th | 7 |

=== Car No. 5 history ===
On August 18, 2025, it was announced that the team would field a fourth car, which would be the No. 5 at the summer Daytona race, with Caesar Bacarella driving. The team obtained owner's points from the No. 5 from Our Motorsports. Stefan Parsons was due to join the team at Gateway Motorsports Park, but withdrew the entry prior to the race. The car was again entered into the Bristol race, but withdrew prior to qualifying when Parsons switched to Joey Gase Motorsports No. 35. During the final race at Phoenix, the team formed partnership with Joey Gase Motorsports again to field the No. 5 for Glen Reen.

==== Car No. 5 results ====
| Year | Driver | No. | Make | 1 | 2 | 3 | 4 | 5 | 6 | 7 | 8 | 9 | 10 | 11 | 12 | 13 | 14 | 15 | 16 | 17 | 18 | 19 | 20 | 21 | 22 | 23 | 24 | 25 | 26 | 27 | 28 | 29 | 30 | 31 | 32 | 33 | Owners | Pts |
|---|---|---|---|---|---|---|---|---|---|---|---|---|---|---|---|---|---|---|---|---|---|---|---|---|---|---|---|---|---|---|---|---|---|---|---|---|---|---|
| 2025 | Caesar Bacarella | 5 | Chevy | DAY | ATL | COA | PHO | LVS | HOM | MAR | DAR | BRI | CAR | TAL | TEX | CLT | NSH | MXC | POC | ATL | CSC | SON | DOV | IND | IOW | GLN | DAY; 28 | PIR | | | | | | TAL; 5 | MAR | | 39th | 227 |
| 2025 | Stefan Parsons | 5 | Chevy | | | | | | | | | | | | | | | | | | | | | | | | | | GTW; Wth | BRI; Wth | KAN | ROV | LVS | | | | 39th | 227 |
| 2025 | Glen Reen | 5 | Ford | | | | | | | | | | | | | | | | | | | | | | | | | | | | | | | | | PHO; 34 | 39th | 227 |

=== Car No. 43 history ===
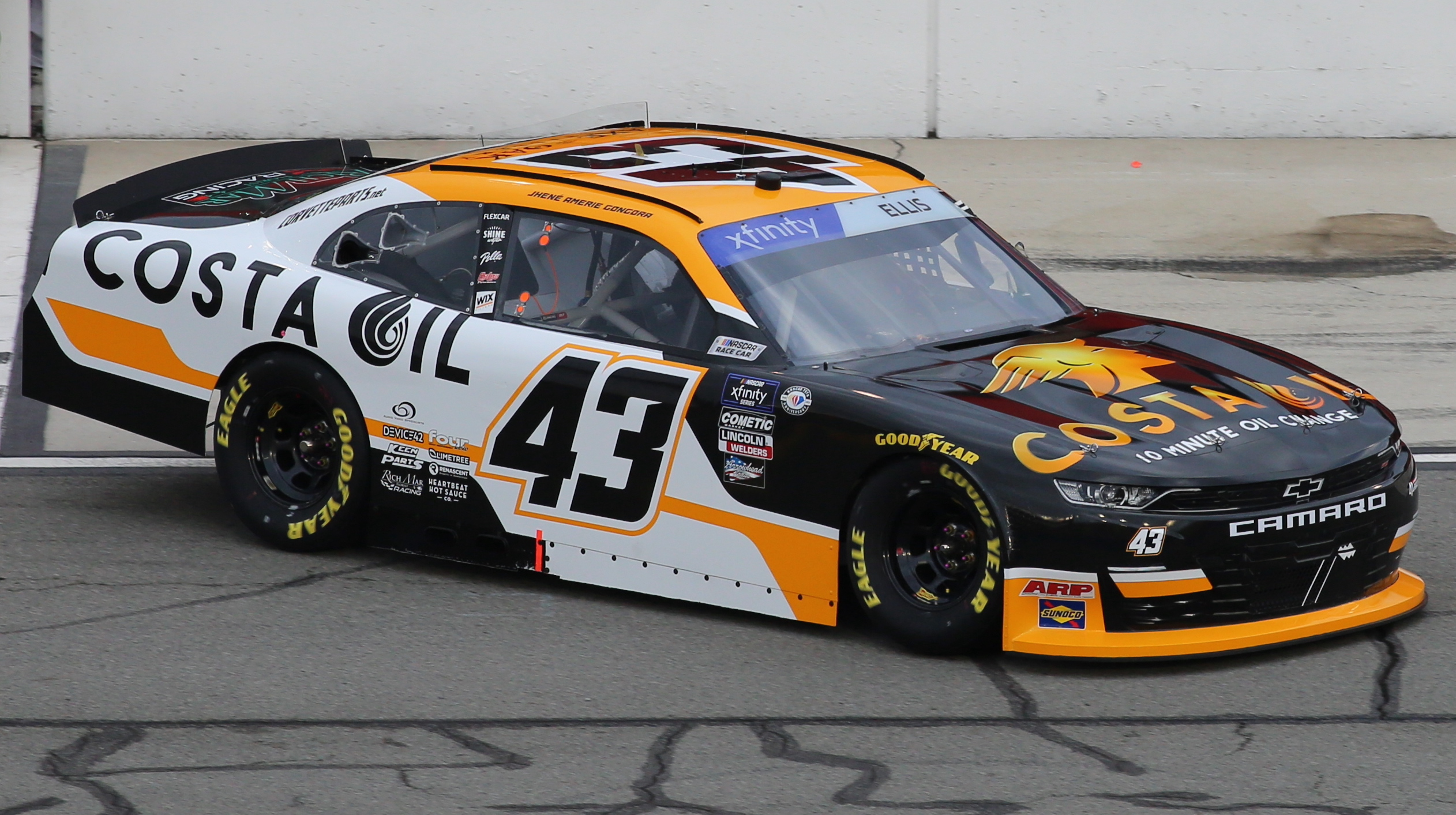
Ryan Ellis in the No. 43 at Auto Club Speedway in 2023

On September 15, 2022, Alpha Prime Racing announced that Ryan Ellis would return for an increased number of races in 2023 with specific partnership announcements coming at a later date. On December 20, the team announced it would be starting a third car with Ellis being the primary driver in 25 races with potentially more races being announced at a later date. He would complete 30 of the 33 races in the 43. Caesar Bacarella drove the car to a sixth place finish at Talladega. Leland Honeyman finished 28th at Portland, while Dylan Lupton finished 24th at Sonoma.

On August 4, 2023, APR announced that Ellis will run full-time in 2024.

==== Car No. 43 results ====
| Year | Driver | No. | Make | 1 | 2 | 3 | 4 | 5 | 6 | 7 | 8 | 9 | 10 | 11 | 12 | 13 | 14 | 15 | 16 | 17 | 18 | 19 | 20 | 21 | 22 | 23 | 24 | 25 | 26 | 27 | 28 | 29 | 30 | 31 | 32 | 33 | Owners | Pts |
|---|---|---|---|---|---|---|---|---|---|---|---|---|---|---|---|---|---|---|---|---|---|---|---|---|---|---|---|---|---|---|---|---|---|---|---|---|---|---|
| 2023 | Ryan Ellis | 43 | Chevy | DAY; 35 | CAL; 34 | LVS; 27 | PHO; 19 | ATL; 23 | COA; 20 | RCH; 15 | MAR; 28 | | DOV; 25 | DAR; 33 | CLT; 27 | | | NSH; 28 | CSC; 31 | ATL; 25 | NHA; 19 | POC; 18 | ROA; 35 | MCH; 23 | IRC; 29 | GLN; 30 | DAY; 32 | DAR; 29 | KAN; 17 | BRI; 18 | TEX; 13 | ROV; 36 | | HOM; 24 | MAR; 24 | PHO; 26 | 28th | 393 |
| 2023 | Ryan Ellis | 43 | Ford | | | | | | | | | | | | | | | | | | | | | | | | | | | | | | LVS; 27 | | | | 28th | 393 |
| 2023 | Caesar Bacarella | 43 | Chevy | | | | | | | | | TAL; 6 | | | | | | | | | | | | | | | | | | | | | | | | | 28th | 393 |
| 2023 | Leland Honeyman | 43 | Chevy | | | | | | | | | | | | | PIR; 28 | | | | | | | | | | | | | | | | | | | | | 28th | 393 |
| 2023 | Dylan Lupton | 43 | Chevy | | | | | | | | | | | | | | SON; 24 | | | | | | | | | | | | | | | | | | | | 28th | 393 |
| 2024 | Ryan Ellis | 43 | Chevy | DAY; 11 | ATL; 25 | LVS; 22 | PHO; 21 | COA; 33 | RCH; 27 | MAR; 26 | TEX; 26 | TAL; 26 | DOV; 13 | DAR; 38 | CLT; 27 | PIR; 17 | SON; 26 | IOW; 14 | NHA; 35 | NSH; 23 | CSC; 21 | POC; 36 | IND; 23 | MCH; 14 | DAY; 37 | DAR; 21 | ATL; 21 | GLN; 15 | BRI; 24 | KAN; 19 | TAL; 15 | ROV; 31 | LVS; 28 | HOM; 25 | MAR; 18 | PHO; 25 | 28th | 441 |

=== Car No. 44 history ===
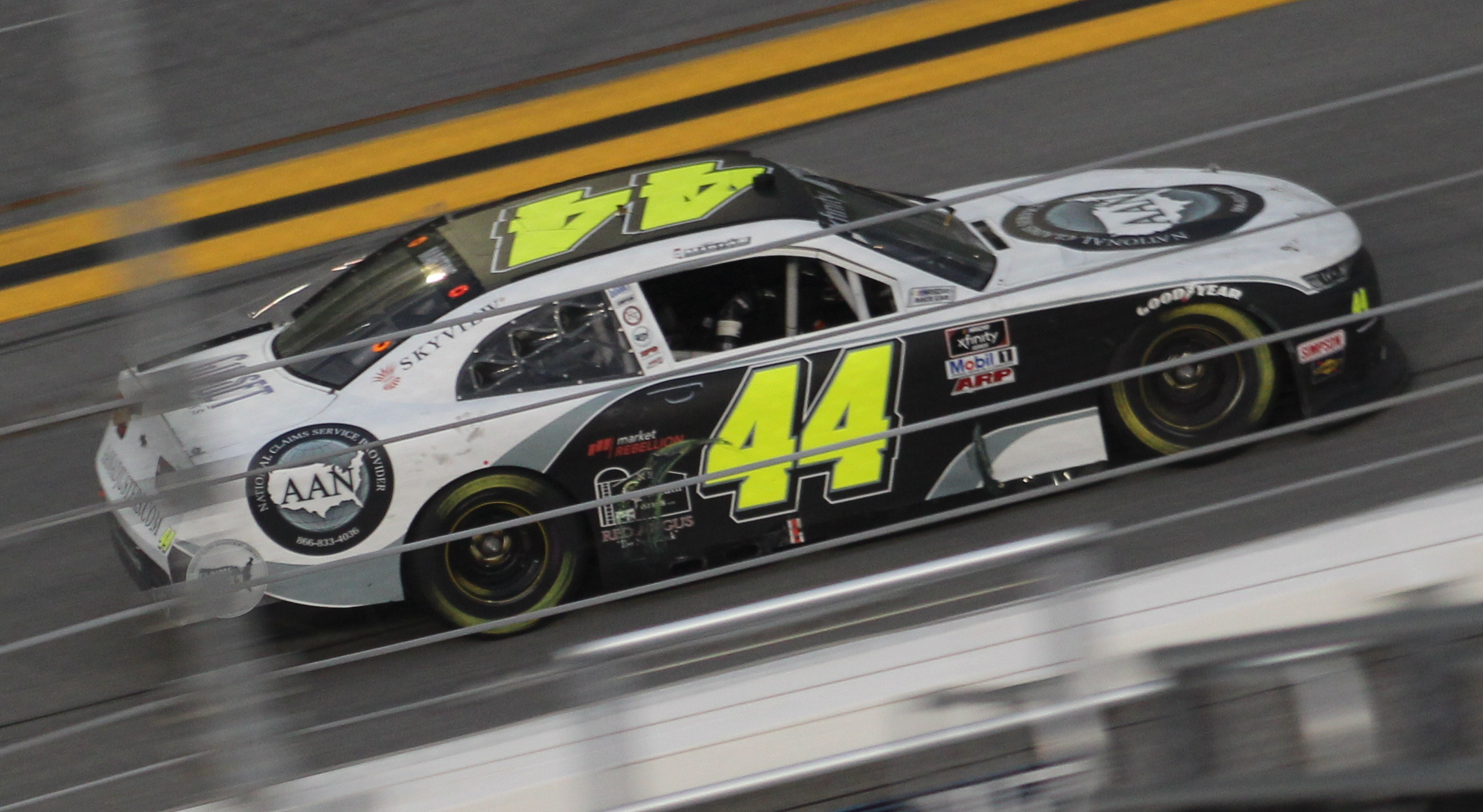
Tommy Joe Martins in the No. 44 at Daytona International Speedway in 2020.

On December 24, 2019, two years after shutting down its operations, Martins Motorsports announced its return to the NASCAR Xfinity Series in 2020, with longtime sponsor and family friend Rodney Riessen joining Craig Martins as the team's co-owners. The team will field the No. 44 Chevrolet Camaro SS for Tommy Joe Martins. The team bought chassis from GMS Racing and JGL Racing to help bolster its inventory, which already included a road course car Martins ran for MBM Motorsports in 2019. The team failed to qualify for the season-opening race at Daytona, and had to temporarily lay off all of its employees during the COVID-19 pandemic. Midway through the season, the team hired Buddy Sisco as crew chief and results turned around. On October 24, Martins recorded both his and the team's first top-10 finish at Texas Motor Speedway with a 10th-place finish; Martins had confirmed a 2021 return earlier that month.

On August 30, 2021, the team announced it had formed a partnership with Caesar Bacarella, renaming the team to Alpha Prime Racing (after Bacarella's fitness brand) beginning with the 2022 season. Martins, Bacarella and Rajah Caruth are signed to drive for the team in 2022. On November 22, 2021, Bacarella was suspended indefinitely by NASCAR for a violation of the sanctioning bodies substance abuse policy. A team statement issued by Tommy Joe Martins (in his capacity as General Manager) said that Bacarella had taken a workout supplement that he was unaware was on the banned substance list and that Bacarella is expected to be reinstated in time for the first race of 2022. On February 14, 2022, Bacarella was reinstated by NASCAR; Martins would drive the car in the opening race at Daytona, with Bacarella instead driving the No. 45.

On December 13, 2022, Alpha Prime Racing said in a press release that Jeffrey Earnhardt will be competing full time for the team in 2023. One of Earnhardt's long-time sponsors, ForeverLawn, will serve as the primary sponsor for the entry for multiple events. However, in the race at COTA, Earnhardt was swapped out in favor of Sage Karam, who only completed 23 laps before engine issues kept him from finishing the race. Earnhardt continued to race the #44 until Darlington in May, when he was swapped to the No. 45 permanently. Several drivers then drove the No. 44 car, including Karam, Rajah Caruth, Daniel Dye, and Greg Van Alst. The car failed to qualify for 6 races in the season. At Martinsville in October, Caruth drove the No. 44 Chevrolet to a twelfth-place finish, the best finish of the season for the team.

On November 9, 2023, Alpha Prime Racing announced that Brennan Poole would drive for the team full-time in 2024 with primary sponsorship from Finance Pro Plus (twenty races) and Macc Door Systems (ten races).

On March 29, 2025, Poole got Alpha Prime their first ever top-five finish on a non-superspeedway with a fourth place finish at Martinsville, while also running in the top-ten for the last twenty laps. Three weeks later at Rockingham, Poole once again got APR a top-five on a non-superspeedway with a fifth-place finish (fourth after a post-race inspection disqualification). Parker Retzlaff also finished third (second after the disqualification), giving APR their first ever double top-five.

On November 18, 2025, Alpha Prime Racing announced that Poole would be returning for the 2026 season.

==== Car No. 44 results ====
| Year | Driver | No. | Make | 1 | 2 | 3 | 4 | 5 | 6 | 7 | 8 | 9 | 10 | 11 | 12 | 13 | 14 | 15 | 16 | 17 | 18 | 19 | 20 | 21 | 22 | 23 | 24 | 25 | 26 | 27 | 28 | 29 | 30 | 31 | 32 | 33 | Owners | Pts |
|---|---|---|---|---|---|---|---|---|---|---|---|---|---|---|---|---|---|---|---|---|---|---|---|---|---|---|---|---|---|---|---|---|---|---|---|---|---|---|
| 2020 | Tommy Joe Martins | 44 | Chevy | DAY; DNQ | LVS; 32 | CAL; 18 | PHO; 28 | DAR; 26 | CLT; 24 | BRI; 23 | ATL; 22 | HOM; 31 | HOM; 20 | TAL; 15 | POC; 30 | IND; 35 | KEN; 33 | KEN; 27 | TEX; 15 | KAN; 18 | ROA; 18 | DAY; 13 | DOV; 21 | DOV; 15 | DAY; 14 | DAR; 26 | RCH; 15 | RCH; 26 | BRI; 24 | LVS; 22 | TAL; 15 | CLT; 27 | KAN; 14 | TEX; 10 | MAR; 16 | PHO; 34 | 22nd | 481 |
| 2021 | Tommy Joe Martins | 44 | Chevy | DAY; 24 | DAY; 24 | HOM; 18 | LVS; 15 | PHO; 17 | ATL; 18 | MAR; 34 | TAL; 11 | DAR; 15 | DOV; 20 | COA; 35 | CLT; 29 | MOH; 39 | TEX; 21 | NSH; 20 | POC; 20 | ROA; 15 | ATL; 16 | NHA; 21 | GLN; 19 | IND; 21 | MCH; 19 | DAY; 18 | DAR; 37 | RCH; 37 | BRI; 23 | LVS; 14 | TAL; 18 | CLT; 33 | TEX; 18 | KAN; 23 | MAR; 40 | PHO; 24 | 22nd | 497 |
| 2022 | Tommy Joe Martins | 44 | Chevy | DAY; 24 | CAL; 31 | | | | | | | | | | | | | | | | | | | | | | | | | TEX; 14 | | | | | | | 25th | 461 |
| 2022 | Ryan Ellis | 44 | Chevy | | | LVS; 13 | PHO; 16 | | | | | TAL; 32 | | | TEX; 30 | CLT; 13 | | NSH; 24 | | | | | IND; 36 | MCH; 27 | | | DAR; 22 | | BRI; 19 | | | | | | | | 25th | 461 |
| 2022 | Sage Karam | 44 | Chevy | | | | | ATL; 32 | COA; 16 | | | | | | | | | | | ATL; 38 | | | | | | DAY; 5 | | | | | | | | | | | 25th | 461 |
| 2022 | Rajah Caruth | 44 | Chevy | | | | | | | RCH; 24 | | | DOV; 38 | | | | | | | | | POC; 38 | | | | | | | | | | | LVS; 20 | | MAR; 12 | PHO; 17 | 25th | 461 |
| 2022 | Howie DiSavino III | 44 | Chevy | | | | | | | | MAR; 36 | | | | | | | | | | NHA; 17 | | | | | | | KAN; 28 | | | TAL; 32 | | | | | | 25th | 461 |
| 2022 | Josh Bilicki | 44 | Chevy | | | | | | | | | | | DAR; 28 | | | | | ROA; 13 | | | | | | | | | | | | | CLT; 34 | | | | | 25th | 461 |
| 2022 | Andy Lally | 44 | Chevy | | | | | | | | | | | | | | PIR; 17 | | | | | | | | | | | | | | | | | | | | 25th | 461 |
| 2022 | Stefan Parsons | 44 | Chevy | | | | | | | | | | | | | | | | | | | | | | GLN; 12 | | | | | | | | | | | | 25th | 461 |
| 2022 | Julia Landauer | 44 | Chevy | | | | | | | | | | | | | | | | | | | | | | | | | | | | | | | HOM; 28 | | | 25th | 461 |
| 2023 | Jeffrey Earnhardt | 44 | Chevy | DAY; 28 | CAL; 26 | LVS; 29 | PHO; 33 | ATL; 34 | | RCH; 18 | MAR; 20 | TAL; 31 | DOV; 37 | | | | | | | | | | | | | | | | | | | | | HOM; 18 | | | 35th | 273 |
| 2023 | Sage Karam | 44 | Chevy | | | | | | COA; 35 | | | | | DAR; 31 | | | SON; 34 | NSH; DNQ | CSC; 22 | | | POC; 38 | | | | | | | | | | | | | | | 35th | 273 |
| 2023 | Rajah Caruth | 44 | Chevy | | | | | | | | | | | | CLT; 25 | | | | | | NHA; 37 | | | | | | | | | BRI; 17 | | ROV; 19 | | | MAR; 12 | | 35th | 273 |
| 2023 | Dylan Lupton | 44 | Chevy | | | | | | | | | | | | | PIR; 29 | | | | | | | | | | | | | | | | | | | | | 35th | 273 |
| 2023 | Greg Van Alst | 44 | Chevy | | | | | | | | | | | | | | | | | ATL; 38 | | | | | | | | | | | | | | | | | 35th | 273 |
| 2023 | Brad Perez | 44 | Chevy | | | | | | | | | | | | | | | | | | | | ROA; 19 | | | | | | | | | | | | | | 35th | 273 |
| 2023 | Mason Massey | 44 | Chevy | | | | | | | | | | | | | | | | | | | | | MCH; DNQ | | | | | | | | | | | | | 35th | 273 |
| 2023 | Conor Daly | 44 | Chevy | | | | | | | | | | | | | | | | | | | | | | IRC; DNQ | | | | | | | | | | | | 35th | 273 |
| 2023 | Stefan Parsons | 44 | Chevy | | | | | | | | | | | | | | | | | | | | | | | GLN; 33 | | | | | | | | | | | 35th | 273 |
| 2023 | Caesar Bacarella | 44 | Chevy | | | | | | | | | | | | | | | | | | | | | | | | DAY; 31 | | | | | | | | | | 35th | 273 |
| 2023 | Dawson Cram | 44 | Chevy | | | | | | | | | | | | | | | | | | | | | | | | | DAR; DNQ | | | | | | | | | 35th | 273 |
| 2023 | Leland Honeyman | 44 | Chevy | | | | | | | | | | | | | | | | | | | | | | | | | | KAN; DNQ | | | | | | | PHO; DNQ | 35th | 273 |
| 2023 | Daniel Dye | 44 | Chevy | | | | | | | | | | | | | | | | | | | | | | | | | | | | TEX; 17 | | LVS; 21 | | | | 35th | 273 |
| 2024 | Brennan Poole | 44 | Chevy | DAY; 19 | ATL; 20 | LVS; 19 | PHO; 20 | COA; 15 | RCH; 28 | MAR; 14 | TEX; 21 | TAL; 5 | DOV; 22 | DAR; 20 | CLT; 31 | PIR; 16 | SON; 14 | IOW; 28 | NHA; 16 | NSH; 21 | CSC; 20 | POC; 26 | IND; 21 | MCH; 33 | DAY; 16 | DAR; 20 | ATL; 15 | GLN; 23 | BRI; 17 | KAN; 18 | TAL; 9 | ROV; 38 | LVS; 21 | HOM; 18 | MAR; 13 | PHO; 24 | 16th | 572 |
| 2025 | Brennan Poole | 44 | Chevy | DAY; 30 | ATL; 17 | COA; 20 | PHO; 17 | LVS; 22 | HOM; 14 | MAR; 4 | DAR; 20 | BRI; 36 | CAR; 4 | TAL; 19 | TEX; 17 | CLT; 22 | NSH; 16 | MXC; 38 | POC; 16 | ATL; 17 | CSC; 10 | SON; 22 | DOV; 27 | IND; 20 | IOW; 20 | GLN; 12 | DAY; 9 | PIR; 13 | GTW; 14 | BRI; 10 | KAN; 28 | ROV; 31 | LVS; 25 | TAL; 19 | MAR; 36 | PHO; 18 | 20th | 608 |
| 2026 | Brennan Poole | 44 | Chevy | DAY; 12 | ATL; 19 | COA; 10 | PHO; 27 | LVS; 20 | DAR; 18 | MAR; 14 | ROC; 14 | BRI; 18 | KAN; 19 | TAL; 15 | TEX; 20 | GLN; 18 | DOV; 11 | CLT; 27 | NSH; 21 | POC; 18 | COR; 24 | SON; 24 | CHI; 25 | ATL; 17 | IND; 29 | IOW; 10 | DAY; 7 | DAR; 15 | | BRI; 13 | | CLT; 10 | | TAL; 26 | MAR; 20 | HOM; 27 | 19th | 605 |
| 2026 | Brennan Poole | 44 | Ford | | | | | | | | | | | | | | | | | | | | | | | | | | GTW; 19 | | LVS; 17 | | PHO; 35 | | | | 19th | 605 |

=== Car No. 45 history ===
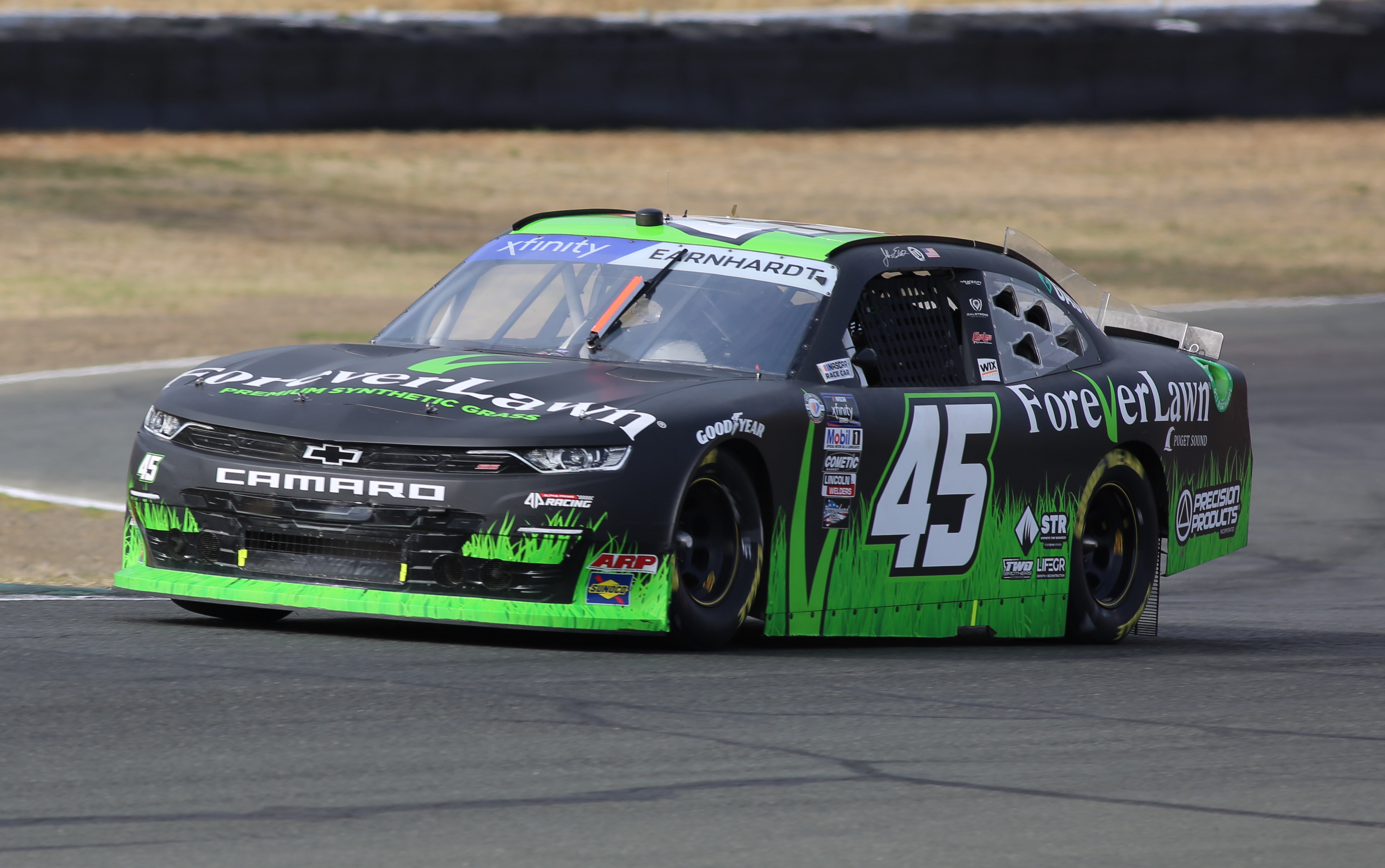
Jeffrey Earnhardt in the No. 45 at Sonoma Raceway in 2023

On April 14, 2017, the team announced a nine-race Xfinity slate for 2017 with Tommy Joe Martins, car No. 45 and sponsor Diamond Gusset Jeans, starting with the spring race at Richmond and focusing primarily on short to intermediate tracks with the exception of the Indianapolis race. After failing to qualify and withdrawing from the first two planned events, the No. 45's schedule was folded into a ride with B. J. McLeod Motorsports, which culminated with a career-best 11th-place finish at Iowa for the driver.

On January 5, 2021, Alpha Prime Racing announced the number for their second full-time entry to be 45 and on January 6 announced Sage Karam to be one of the drivers.

On December 2, 2022, Alpha Prime Racing announced that Sage Karam would be returning in 2023 for seeventeen races, starting with the spring race at Atlanta. On December 23, 2022, Alpha Prime announced that Stefan Parsons would also be returning for select races in 2023. Caesar Bacarella would also be driving the car at Daytona and Talladega.

The No. 45 scaled back to a part–time schedule in 2024. Confirmed drivers are Bacarella for at least four superspeedway races, and Brad Perez for the race at the Circuit of the Americas. On July 16, Alpha Prime acquired the owner points from the JD Motorsports No. 4 for the No. 45 at Indianapolis, after JD Motorsports filed for Chapter 11 bankruptcy.

In 2025, the No. 45 returned to full-time competition, and it was shared by Caesar Bacarella, Mason Massey, Brad Perez, Vicente Salas, Lavar Scott, Stefan Parsons, and Josh Williams.

On December 8, 2025, it was announced that Lavar Scott would drive the No. 45 full-time in 2026.

==== Car No. 45 results ====
| Year | Driver | No. | Make | 1 | 2 | 3 | 4 | 5 | 6 | 7 | 8 | 9 | 10 | 11 | 12 | 13 | 14 | 15 | 16 | 17 | 18 | 19 | 20 | 21 | 22 | 23 | 24 | 25 | 26 | 27 | 28 | 29 | 30 | 31 | 32 | 33 | Owners | Pts |
|---|---|---|---|---|---|---|---|---|---|---|---|---|---|---|---|---|---|---|---|---|---|---|---|---|---|---|---|---|---|---|---|---|---|---|---|---|---|---|
| 2017 | Tommy Joe Martins | 45 | Chevy | DAY | ATL | LVS | PHO | CAL | TEX | BRI | RCH; DNQ | TAL | CLT | DOV | POC | MCH | IOW | DAY | KEN | NHA | IND | IOW | GLN | MOH | BRI | ROA | DAR | RCH | CHI | KEN | DOV | CLT | KAN | TEX | PHO | HOM | 49th | 0 |
| 2022 | Caesar Bacarella | 45 | Chevy | DAY; 38 | | | | | | | | TAL; 25 | | | | | | | | ATL; 28 | | | | | | DAY; 28 | | | | | TAL; 31 | | | | | | 28th | 415 |
| 2022 | Kaz Grala | 45 | Chevy | | CAL; 25 | LVS; 23 | PHO; 33 | | | | | | | | | | | | | | | | | | | | | | | | | | | | | | 28th | 415 |
| 2022 | Tommy Joe Martins | 45 | Chevy | | | | | ATL; 20 | | | | | | DAR; 17 | | | | | | | | | | | | | | | | | | | | | | | 28th | 415 |
| 2022 | Josh Bilicki | 45 | Chevy | | | | | | COA; 35 | | | | | | | | | | | | | | | MCH; 28 | GLN; 17 | | | | | | | | | | | | 28th | 415 |
| 2022 | Howie DiSavino III | 45 | Chevy | | | | | | | RCH; DNQ | | | | | | | | | | | | | | | | | | | | | | | | | MAR; 28 | | 28th | 415 |
| 2022 | Ryan Ellis | 45 | Chevy | | | | | | | | MAR; DNQ | | DOV; 20 | | | | | | | | | | | | | | | | | | | | | | | | 28th | 415 |
| 2022 | Stefan Parsons | 45 | Chevy | | | | | | | | | | | | TEX; 17 | CLT; 30 | PIR; 24 | NSH; 15 | | | | | | | | | DAR; 17 | | BRI; 8 | TEX; 13 | | ROV; 25 | LVS; 23 | HOM; 34 | | PHO; 28 | 28th | 415 |
| 2022 | Sage Karam | 45 | Chevy | | | | | | | | | | | | | | | | ROA; 31 | | | POC; 20 | IRC; 13 | | | | | | | | | | | | | | 28th | 415 |
| 2022 | Julia Landauer | 45 | Chevy | | | | | | | | | | | | | | | | | | NHA; 36 | | | | | | | | | | | | | | | | 28th | 415 |
| 2022 | Rajah Caruth | 45 | Chevy | | | | | | | | | | | | | | | | | | | | | | | | | KAN; 25 | | | | | | | | | 28th | 415 |
| 2023 | Stefan Parsons | 45 | Chevy | DAY; 13 | | | | | | | | | | | | | | | | | | | | | | | | | | | | | | | | | 27th | 430 |
| 2023 | Rajah Caruth | 45 | Chevy | | CAL; 21 | LVS; 26 | | | | | | | DOV; 26 | | | | | | | | | | | | | | | DAR; 16 | KAN; 29 | | | | LVS; 23 | | | | 27th | 430 |
| 2023 | Leland Honeyman | 45 | Chevy | | | | PHO; 27 | | | RCH; 25 | MAR; 25 | | | | | | | | | | | | ROA; 28 | | | | | | | | | ROV; 21 | | HOM; 23 | | | 27th | 430 |
| 2023 | Sage Karam | 45 | Chevy | | | | | ATL; 31 | | | | | | | | | | | | | | | | | IRC; 15 | GLN; 15 | | | | | | | | | | | 27th | 430 |
| 2023 | Jeffrey Earnhardt | 45 | Chevy | | | | | | COA; 25 | | | | | DAR; 26 | CLT; 21 | PIR; 19 | SON; 36 | NSH; 27 | CSC; DNQ | ATL; 23 | | POC; 19 | | MCH; 24 | | | DAY; 11 | | | BRI; 32 | TEX; 32 | | | | MAR; 26 | PHO; 23 | 27th | 430 |
| 2023 | Ryan Ellis | 45 | Chevy | | | | | | | | | TAL; 11 | | | | | | | | | | | | | | | | | | | | | | | | | 27th | 430 |
| 2023 | Greg Van Alst | 45 | Chevy | | | | | | | | | | | | | | | | | | NHA; 38 | | | | | | | | | | | | | | | | 27th | 430 |
| 2024 | Caesar Bacarella | 45 | Chevy | DAY; DNQ | ATL | LVS | PHO | | | | | TAL; 7 | DOV | DAR | CLT | PIR | SON | IOW | NHA | NSH | | | | MCH; 9 | DAY; 29 | | | | | | | | | | | | 36th | 265 |
| 2024 | Brad Perez | 45 | Chevy | | | | | COA; 18 | RCH | MAR | TEX | | | | | | | | | | | | | | | | | | | KAN; 37 | | ROV; 26 | | | | | 36th | 265 |
| 2024 | Alon Day | 45 | Chevy | | | | | | | | | | | | | | | | | | CSC; DNQ | POC | | | | | | GLN; 36 | | | | | | | | | 36th | 265 |
| 2024 | Garrett Smithley | 45 | Chevy | | | | | | | | | | | | | | | | | | | | IND; 31 | | | DAR; 30 | ATL; 23 | | | | | | LVS; 29 | | MAR; 32 | | 36th | 265 |
| 2024 | Stefan Parsons | 45 | Chevy | | | | | | | | | | | | | | | | | | | | | | | | | | BRI; 33 | | | | | | | PHO; 38 | 36th | 265 |
| 2024 | Tommy Joe Martins | 45 | Chevy | | | | | | | | | | | | | | | | | | | | | | | | | | | | TAL; 13 | | | | | | 36th | 265 |
| 2024 | Mason Maggio | 45 | Chevy | | | | | | | | | | | | | | | | | | | | | | | | | | | | | | | HOM; 31 | | | 36th | 265 |
| 2025 | Caesar Bacarella | 45 | Chevy | DAY; 13 | | | | | | | | | | TAL; 30 | | | | | | | | | | | | | | | | | | | | | | | 33rd | 326 |
| 2025 | Mason Massey | 45 | Chevy | | ATL; 28 | | PHO; 22 | LVS; 37 | | | DAR; 29 | BRI; 25 | | | TEX; 21 | | NSH; 24 | | POC; 20 | ATL; 20 | | | | IND; 24 | IOW; 37 | | | | | | KAN; 31 | | LVS; 37 | | | | 33rd | 326 |
| 2025 | Brad Perez | 45 | Chevy | | | COA; DNQ | | | HOM; 28 | MAR; 23 | | | | | | CLT; 35 | | MXC; 26 | | | CSC; 30 | SON; 31 | | | | | | | | | | | | | | | 33rd | 326 |
| 2025 | Vicente Salas | 45 | Chevy | | | | | | | | | | CAR; 24 | | | | | | | | | | | | | | | PIR; 37 | | | | | | | | | 33rd | 326 |
| 2025 | Lavar Scott | 45 | Chevy | | | | | | | | | | | | | | | | | | | | DOV; 28 | | | | | | GTW; 19 | | | | | | | | 33rd | 326 |
| 2025 | Stefan Parsons | 45 | Chevy | | | | | | | | | | | | | | | | | | | | | | | GLN; 19 | | | | | | | | | | | 33rd | 326 |
| 2025 | Josh Williams | 45 | Chevy | | | | | | | | | | | | | | | | | | | | | | | | DAY; 34 | | | BRI; 28 | | ROV; 37 | | TAL; 14 | MAR; 28 | PHO; 26 | 33rd | 326 |
| 2026 | Lavar Scott | 45 | Chevy | DAY; 16 | ATL; 28 | COA; 22 | PHO; 33 | LVS; 26 | DAR; 36 | MAR; 22 | ROC; 15 | BRI; 32 | KAN; 18 | TAL; 27 | TEX; 19 | GLN; 27 | DOV; 36 | CLT; 17 | NSH; 31 | POC; 29 | COR; 29 | SON; 32 | CHI; 28 | ATL; 21 | IND; 27 | IOW; 28 | DAY; 18 | DAR; 31 | | BRI; 36 | LVS; 26 | | PHO; 19 | | MAR; 18 | | 33rd | 362 |
| 2026 | Lavar Scott | 45 | Ford | | | | | | | | | | | | | | | | | | | | | | | | | | GTW; 30 | | | CLT; 27 | | TAL; DNQ | | HOM; 21 | 33rd | 362 |

=== Car No. 67 history ===
This car was the team's secondary focus in their 2014 foray, with Clay Greenfield behind the wheel at Daytona. However, he along with Willie Allen failed to qualify, making Martins Motorsports 0 for 2 in that race. The car withdrew the next week after no driver was found to drive it. The team then took time off to prepare for the spring Bristol race, where Tommy Joe Martins crashed in qualifying and withdrew. To recoup from that, the team did not return until Michigan, when Benny Gordon qualified the car but then switched to Martins when he failed to qualify the No. 76.

==== Car No. 67 results ====
| Year | Driver | No. | Make | 1 | 2 | 3 | 4 | 5 | 6 | 7 | 8 | 9 | 10 | 11 | 12 | 13 | 14 | 15 | 16 | 17 | 18 | 19 | 20 | 21 | 22 | 23 | 24 | 25 | 26 | 27 | 28 | 29 | 30 | 31 | 32 | 33 | Owners | Pts |
|---|---|---|---|---|---|---|---|---|---|---|---|---|---|---|---|---|---|---|---|---|---|---|---|---|---|---|---|---|---|---|---|---|---|---|---|---|---|---|
| 2014 | Clay Greenfield | 67 | Dodge | DAY; DNQ | PHO | LVS | | | | | | | | | | | | | | | | | | | | | | | | | | | | | | | 63rd | 6 |
| 2014 | Tommy Joe Martins | 67 | Dodge | | | | BRI; DNQ | CAL | TEX | DAR | RCH | TAL | IOW | CLT | DOV | | | | | | | | | | | | | | | | | | | | | | 63rd | 6 |
| 2014 | Tommy Joe Martins | 67 | Ford | | | | | | | | | | | | | MCH; 38 | ROA | KEN | DAY | NHA | CHI | IND | IOW | GLN | MOH | BRI | ATL | RCH | CHI | KEN | DOV | KAN | CLT | TEX | PHO | HOM | 63rd | 6 |

=== Car No. 76 history ===
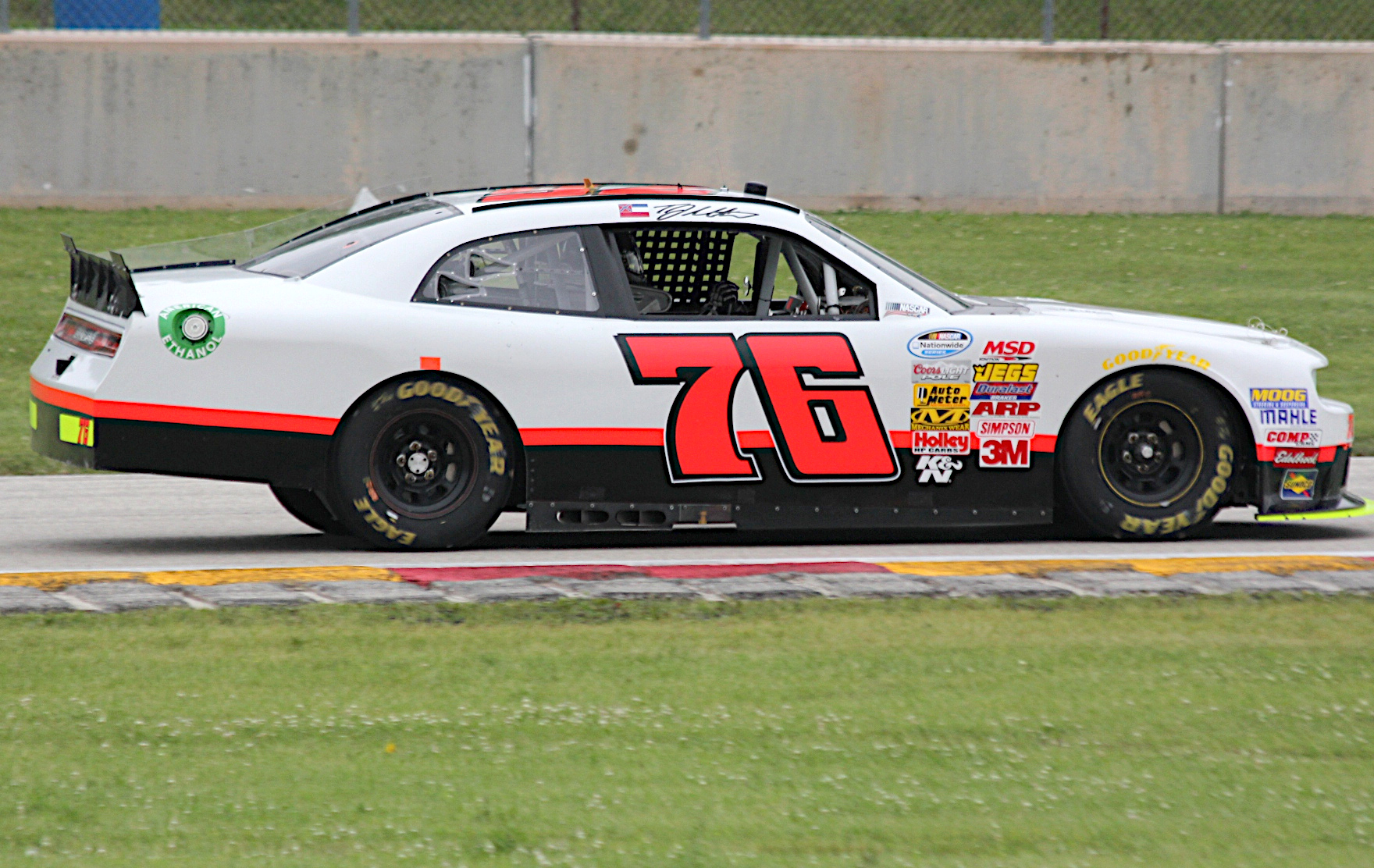
Martins in the No. 76 at Road America in 2014.

The primary focus in 2014, Nationwide veteran Willie Allen failed to qualify the No. 76 at Daytona and Bristol. Tommy Joe Martins then took over the reins of what was left as the team's only entry after the demise of the No. 67, making eight races in the No. 76 and failing to qualify for four, including its last three attempts. The team primarily start and parked, but ran full races at higher-paying events like at Talladega and Charlotte. The team's last attempt was at Indianapolis Motor Speedway.

==== Car No. 76 results ====
| Year | Driver | No. | Make | 1 | 2 | 3 | 4 | 5 | 6 | 7 | 8 | 9 | 10 | 11 | 12 | 13 | 14 | 15 | 16 | 17 | 18 | 19 | 20 | 21 | 22 | 23 | 24 | 25 | 26 | 27 | 28 | 29 | 30 | 31 | 32 | 33 | Owners | Pts |
|---|---|---|---|---|---|---|---|---|---|---|---|---|---|---|---|---|---|---|---|---|---|---|---|---|---|---|---|---|---|---|---|---|---|---|---|---|---|---|
| 2014 | Willie Allen | 76 | Dodge | DAY; DNQ | | | BRI; DNQ | CAL | | | | | | | | | | | | | | | | | | | | | | | | | | | | | 44th | 118 |
| 2014 | Tommy Joe Martins | 76 | Dodge | | | | | | TEX; 35 | DAR; 30 | RCH; 36 | TAL; 14 | | CLT; 31 | DOV; 35 | MCH; DNQ | ROA; 31 | KEN; DNQ | DAY; DNQ | NHA | CHI | | | | | | | | | | | | | | | | 44th | 118 |
| 2014 | Tommy Joe Martins | 76 | Ford | | PHO; 35 | LVS; 39 | | | | | | | IOW; 36 | | | | | | | | | IND; DNQ | IOW | GLN | MOH | BRI | ATL | RCH | CHI | KEN | DOV | KAN | CLT | TEX | PHO | HOM | 44th | 118 |

== Camping World Truck Series ==
=== Truck No. 42 history ===
The team debuted the No. 42 in 2011 at Lucas Oil Indianapolis Raceway Park with Tommy Joe Martins behind the wheel. The team returned at Iowa Speedway in 2017 with Matt Mills behind the wheel and additional races to be determined. Though the car never hit the track that weekend, the scheme was included in the original version of NASCAR Heat 2. The additional races were in the team's No. 44 entry. Martins returned for the 2017 Jag Metals 350 but a possible suspension problem led to a wrecked truck in practice, and a blown right-front tire three laps into the race ended Martins' weekend. The backup truck was loaned from fellow independent Mike Harmon.

==== Truck No. 42 results ====
| Year | Driver | No. | Make | 1 | 2 | 3 | 4 | 5 | 6 | 7 | 8 | 9 | 10 | 11 | 12 | 13 | 14 | 15 | 16 | 17 | 18 | 19 | 20 | 21 | 22 | 23 | 24 | 25 | Owners | Pts |
|---|---|---|---|---|---|---|---|---|---|---|---|---|---|---|---|---|---|---|---|---|---|---|---|---|---|---|---|---|---|---|
| 2011 | Tommy Joe Martins | 42 | Ram | DAY | PHO | DAR | MAR | NSH | DOV | CLT | KAN | TEX | KEN | IOW | NSH | IRP; 33 | POC | MCH | BRI | ATL | CHI | NHA | KEN | LVS | TAL | MAR | TEX | HOM | | |
| 2017 | Tommy Joe Martins | 42 | Chevy | DAY | ATL | MAR | KAN | CLT | DOV | TEX | GTW | IOW | KEN | ELD | POC | MCH | BRI | MSP | CHI | NHA | LVS | TAL | MAR | TEX; 32 | PHO | HOM | | | | |

=== Truck No. 44 history ===
The first race for Martins Motorsports was in 2009, when Tommy Joe Martins ran a four race schedule, recording a best finish of 21st at Chicagoland. The team and driver returned for one race as the No. 42 in 2011, finishing 33rd at Lucas Oil Raceway. After taking all of 2015 off to recover from a failed Xfinity Series effort, the team returned in 2016 with Martins as the full-time driver except for a qualifying crash at Martinsville (spot sold to Austin Wayne Self), Eldora (dirt racer J. R. Heffner), and a DNQ at Homestead-Miami.

On February 13, 2017, Martins Motorsports announced a partnership with another family Truck team, Brandonbilt Motorsports, to put driver Brandon Brown in the 44 truck for "select races". However, the operations of the 44 truck ceased with the 2017 Xfinity announcement except for Heffner again piloting the truck at Eldora. After ceasing operations, owner points of the 44 truck were sold to Faith Motorsports. When that team ran into organizational trouble mid-season, Matt Mills drove the truck for a race at Kentucky but crashed out. The much-anticipated return of Heffner the following race was derailed due to a blown engine early in the weekend, the entry never making it to the grid. After the Eldora race, the 44 became a joint-prepared effort between Martins and AM Racing. That relationship lasted through the end of the season except for Faith and Ted Minor running a Las Vegas shooting paint scheme at Texas.

==== Truck No. 44 results ====
| Year | Driver | No. | Make | 1 | 2 | 3 | 4 | 5 | 6 | 7 | 8 | 9 | 10 | 11 | 12 | 13 | 14 | 15 | 16 | 17 | 18 | 19 | 20 | 21 | 22 | 23 | 24 | 25 | Owners | Pts |
|---|---|---|---|---|---|---|---|---|---|---|---|---|---|---|---|---|---|---|---|---|---|---|---|---|---|---|---|---|---|---|
| 2009 | Tommy Joe Martins | 44 | Ford | DAY | CAL | ATL | MAR | KAN | CLT | DOV | TEX | MCH | MLW | MEM | KEN | IRP; 22 | NSH; 27 | BRI | CHI; 21 | IOW | GTW; 27 | NHA | LVS | MAR | TAL | TEX | PHO | HOM | | |
| 2016 | Tommy Joe Martins | 44 | Chevy | DAY; 32 | ATL; 25 | | KAN; 32 | DOV; 24 | CLT; 25 | TEX; 25 | IOW; 30 | GTW; 18 | KEN; 26 | | POC; 17 | BRI; 31 | MCH; 15 | MSP; 19 | CHI; 24 | NHA; 21 | LVS; 22 | TAL; 16 | MAR; 25 | TEX; 31 | PHO; 30 | HOM; DNQ | | | | |
| 2016 | Austin Wayne Self | 44 | Toyota | | | MAR; 15 | | | | | | | | | | | | | | | | | | | | | | | | |
| 2016 | J. R. Heffner | 44 | Chevy | | | | | | | | | | | ELD; 15 | | | | | | | | | | | | | | | | |
| 2017 | Brandon Brown | 44 | Chevy | DAY; DNQ | | MAR; 27 | KAN | CLT | DOV | TEX | GTW | IOW | | | | | | | | | | | | | | | | | | |
| 2017 | Tommy Joe Martins | 44 | Chevy | | ATL; 23 | | | | | | | | | | | | | | | | | | | | | | | | | |
| 2017 | Matt Mills | 44 | Chevy | | | | | | | | | | KEN; 29 | | | | | | | | | | | | | | | | | |
| 2017 | J. R. Heffner | 44 | Chevy | | | | | | | | | | | ELD; Wth | | | | | | | | | | | | | | | | |
| 2017 | Austin Wayne Self | 44 | Chevy | | | | | | | | | | | | POC; 16 | MCH; 15 | BRI; 24 | MSP | CHI; 20 | NHA; 14 | LVS; 20 | TAL | MAR; 29 | TEX | PHO; 25 | HOM; 17 | | | | |

== ARCA Menards Series ==
=== Car No. 42 history ===
In 2011, the team fielded the No. 42 Dodge at Daytona with Tommy Joe Martins behind the wheel. He finished fourteenth.

==== Car No. 42 results ====
| Year | Driver | No. | Make | 1 | 2 | 3 | 4 | 5 | 6 | 7 | 8 | 9 | 10 | 11 | 12 | 13 | 14 | 15 | 16 | 17 | 18 | 19 | Owners | Pts |
|---|---|---|---|---|---|---|---|---|---|---|---|---|---|---|---|---|---|---|---|---|---|---|---|---|
| 2011 | Tommy Joe Martins | 42 | Dodge | DAY; 14 | TAL | SLM | TOL | NJE | CHI | POC | MCH | WIN | BLN | IOW | IRP | POC | ISF | MAD | DSF | SLM | KAN | TOL | | |

=== Car No. 44 history ===
October 8, 2026, the team announced that they will launch their ARCA Menards Series program. On October 28, 2026, it was announced that Dystany Spurlock will run a majority of the ARCA schedule in the No. 44 Ford in 2027.

=== Car No. 95 history ===
The team debuted in the ARCA Series in 2010. They fielded the No. 95 Ford for Tommy Joe Martins at Daytona. He finished eighth.

==== Car No. 95 results ====
| Year | Driver | No. | Make | 1 | 2 | 3 | 4 | 5 | 6 | 7 | 8 | 9 | 10 | 11 | 12 | 13 | 14 | 15 | 16 | 17 | 18 | 19 | 20 | Owners | Pts |
|---|---|---|---|---|---|---|---|---|---|---|---|---|---|---|---|---|---|---|---|---|---|---|---|---|---|
| 2010 | Tommy Joe Martins | 95 | Ford | DAY; 8 | PBE | SLM | TEX | TAL | TOL | POC | MCH | IOW | MFD | POC | BLN | NJE | ISF | CHI | DSF | TOL | SLM | KAN | CAR | | |
