= 2023 Food City 300 =

27th race of the 2023 NASCAR Xfinity Series

Race details
- Race 27 of 33 of the 2023 NASCAR Xfinity Series
- Date: September 15, 2023
- Official name: 42nd Annual Food City 300
- Location: Bristol Motor Speedway, Bristol, Tennessee
- Course: Permanent racing facility
- Course length: 0.533 miles (0.858 km)
- Distance: 300 laps, 160 mi (257 km)
- Scheduled distance: 300 laps, 160 mi (257 km)
- Average speed: 85.521 mph (137.633 km/h)

Pole position
Driver	Cole Custer	Stewart-Haas Racing
- Time: 15.684

Most laps led
Driver	Justin Allgaier	JR Motorsports
- Laps: 110

Winner
No. 7	Justin Allgaier	JR Motorsports

Television in the United States
- Network: USA
- Announcers: Rick Allen, Jeff Burton, and Steve Letarte

Radio in the United States
- Radio: PRN

The 2023 Food City 300 was the 27th stock car race of the 2023 NASCAR Xfinity Series, the first race of the Round of 12, and the 42nd iteration of the event. The race was held on Friday, September 15, 2023, in Bristol, Tennessee at Bristol Motor Speedway, a 0.533 miles (0.858 km) permanent oval shaped racetrack. The race took the scheduled 300 laps to complete. Justin Allgaier, driving for JR Motorsports, would complete a successful pit road strategy, driving through the field and passing Daniel Hemric for the lead with over 10 laps to go, earning his 22nd career NASCAR Xfinity Series win, and his third of the season. He would also earn a spot in the next round of the playoffs. Allgaier and pole-sitter Cole Custer would end up dominating the entire race, leading 110 and 109 laps, respectively. To fill out the podium, Hemric, driving for Kaulig Racing, and John Hunter Nemechek, driving for Joe Gibbs Racing, would finish 2nd and 3rd, respectively.

== Background ==
The Bristol Motor Speedway, formerly known as Bristol International Raceway and Bristol Raceway, is a NASCAR short track venue located in Bristol, Tennessee. Constructed in 1960, it held its first NASCAR race on July 30, 1961. Despite its short length, Bristol is among the most popular tracks on the NASCAR schedule because of its distinct features, which include extraordinarily steep banking, an all concrete surface, two pit roads, and stadium-like seating. It has also been named one of the loudest NASCAR tracks.

=== Entry list ===
- (R) denotes rookie driver.
- (i) denotes driver who is ineligible for series driver points.
- (P) denotes playoff driver.

#	Driver	Team	Make
00	Cole Custer (P)	Stewart-Haas Racing	Ford
1	Sam Mayer (P)	JR Motorsports	Chevrolet
02	Blaine Perkins (R)	Our Motorsports	Chevrolet
2	Sheldon Creed (P)	Richard Childress Racing	Chevrolet
4	Kyle Weatherman	JD Motorsports	Chevrolet
6	Brennan Poole	JD Motorsports	Chevrolet
07	Stefan Parsons	SS-Green Light Racing	Chevrolet
7	Justin Allgaier (P)	JR Motorsports	Chevrolet
08	Chad Finchum	SS-Green Light Racing	Ford
8	Josh Berry (P)	JR Motorsports	Chevrolet
9	Brandon Jones	JR Motorsports	Chevrolet
10	Daniel Hemric (P)	Kaulig Racing	Chevrolet
11	Derek Kraus	Kaulig Racing	Chevrolet
16	Chandler Smith (R) (P)	Kaulig Racing	Chevrolet
18	Sammy Smith (R) (P)	Joe Gibbs Racing	Toyota
19	Trevor Bayne	Joe Gibbs Racing	Toyota
20	John Hunter Nemechek (P)	Joe Gibbs Racing	Toyota
21	Austin Hill (P)	Richard Childress Racing	Chevrolet
24	Connor Mosack (R)	Sam Hunt Racing	Toyota
25	Brett Moffitt	AM Racing	Ford
26	Kaz Grala	Sam Hunt Racing	Toyota
27	Jeb Burton (P)	Jordan Anderson Racing	Chevrolet
28	Kyle Sieg	RSS Racing	Ford
31	Parker Retzlaff (R)	Jordan Anderson Racing	Chevrolet
35	Patrick Emerling	Emerling-Gase Motorsports	Chevrolet
38	Joe Graf Jr.	RSS Racing	Ford
39	Ryan Sieg	RSS Racing	Ford
43	Ryan Ellis	Alpha Prime Racing	Chevrolet
44	Rajah Caruth (i)	Alpha Prime Racing	Chevrolet
45	Jeffrey Earnhardt	Alpha Prime Racing	Chevrolet
48	Parker Kligerman (P)	Big Machine Racing	Chevrolet
51	Jeremy Clements	Jeremy Clements Racing	Chevrolet
53	B. J. McLeod	Emerling-Gase Motorsports	Chevrolet
66	Timmy Hill (i)	MBM Motorsports	Toyota
78	Anthony Alfredo	B. J. McLeod Motorsports	Chevrolet
88	Dale Earnhardt Jr.	JR Motorsports	Chevrolet
91	Josh Bilicki	DGM Racing	Chevrolet
92	Josh Williams	DGM Racing	Chevrolet
98	Riley Herbst	Stewart-Haas Racing	Ford
Official entry list

== Practice ==
For practice, drivers will be separated into two groups, Group A and B. Both sessions will be 15 minutes long, and will be held on Friday, September 15, at 2:35 PM EST. Chandler Smith, driving for Kaulig Racing, would set the fastest time between both sessions, with a lap of 16.038, and an average speed of 119.641 mph (192.544 km/h).

Pos.	#	Driver	Team	Make	Time	Speed
1	16	Chandler Smith (R) (P)	Kaulig Racing	Chevrolet	16.038	119.641
2	00	Cole Custer (P)	Stewart-Haas Racing	Ford	16.047	119.574
3	20	John Hunter Nemechek (P)	Joe Gibbs Racing	Toyota	16.076	119.358
Full practice results

== Qualifying ==
Qualifying was held on Friday, September 15, at 3:10 PM EST. Since Bristol Motor Speedway is a short track, the qualifying system used is a single-car, two-lap system with only one round. In that round, whoever sets the fastest time will win the pole. Cole Custer, driving for Stewart-Haas Racing, would score the pole for the race, with a lap of 15.684, and an average speed of 122.341 mph (196.889 km/h).

Pos.	#	Driver	Team	Make	Time	Speed
1	00	Cole Custer (P)	Stewart-Haas Racing	Ford	15.684	122.341
2	8	Josh Berry (P)	JR Motorsports	Chevrolet	15.712	122.123
3	20	John Hunter Nemechek (P)	Joe Gibbs Racing	Toyota	15.717	122.084
4	16	Chandler Smith (R) (P)	Kaulig Racing	Chevrolet	15.740	121.906
5	10	Daniel Hemric (P)	Kaulig Racing	Chevrolet	15.788	121.535
6	18	Sammy Smith (R) (P)	Joe Gibbs Racing	Toyota	15.792	121.505
7	39	Ryan Sieg	RSS Racing	Ford	15.793	121.497
8	9	Brandon Jones	JR Motorsports	Chevrolet	15.800	121.443
9	51	Jeremy Clements	Jeremy Clements Racing	Chevrolet	15.801	121.435
10	7	Justin Allgaier (P)	JR Motorsports	Chevrolet	15.807	121.389
11	1	Sam Mayer (P)	JR Motorsports	Chevrolet	15.816	121.320
12	19	Trevor Bayne	Joe Gibbs Racing	Toyota	15.843	121.113
13	48	Parker Kligerman (P)	Big Machine Racing	Chevrolet	15.860	120.984
14	31	Parker Retzlaff (R)	Jordan Anderson Racing	Chevrolet	15.899	120.687
15	88	Dale Earnhardt Jr.	JR Motorsports	Chevrolet	15.911	120.596
16	98	Riley Herbst	Stewart-Haas Racing	Ford	15.917	120.550
17	45	Jeffrey Earnhardt	Alpha Prime Racing	Chevrolet	15.936	120.407
18	11	Derek Kraus	Kaulig Racing	Chevrolet	15.965	120.188
19	38	Joe Graf Jr.	RSS Racing	Ford	15.982	120.060
20	92	Josh Williams	DGM Racing	Chevrolet	16.019	119.783
21	2	Sheldon Creed (P)	Richard Childress Racing	Chevrolet	16.028	119.715
22	43	Ryan Ellis	Alpha Prime Racing	Chevrolet	16.038	119.641
23	08	Chad Finchum	SS-Green Light Racing	Ford	16.039	119.633
24	91	Josh Bilicki	DGM Racing	Chevrolet	16.058	119.492
25	44	Rajah Caruth (i)	Alpha Prime Racing	Chevrolet	16.066	119.432
26	21	Austin Hill (P)	Richard Childress Racing	Chevrolet	16.068	119.417
27	28	Kyle Sieg	RSS Racing	Ford	16.081	119.321
28	6	Brennan Poole	JD Motorsports	Chevrolet	16.095	119.217
29	24	Connor Mosack (R)	Sam Hunt Racing	Toyota	16.112	119.091
30	4	Kyle Weatherman	JD Motorsports	Chevrolet	16.112	119.091
31	26	Kaz Grala	Sam Hunt Racing	Toyota	16.115	119.069
32	78	Anthony Alfredo	B. J. McLeod Motorsports	Chevrolet	16.117	119.054
33	02	Blaine Perkins (R)	Our Motorsports	Chevrolet	16.175	118.628
Qualified by owner's points
34	66	Timmy Hill (i)	MBM Motorsports	Toyota	16.211	118.364
35	07	Stefan Parsons	SS-Green Light Racing	Chevrolet	16.214	118.342
36	25	Brett Moffitt	AM Racing	Ford	16.222	118.284
37	35	Patrick Emerling	Emerling-Gase Motorsports	Chevrolet	–	–
38	27	Jeb Burton (P)	Jordan Anderson Racing	Chevrolet	–	–
Withdrew
39	53	B. J. McLeod	Emerling-Gase Motorsports	Chevrolet	–	–
Official qualifying results
Official starting lineup

== Race results ==
Stage 1 Laps: 85

Pos.	#	Driver	Team	Make	Pts
1	00	Cole Custer (P)	Stewart-Haas Racing	Ford	10
2	7	Justin Allgaier (P)	JR Motorsports	Chevrolet	9
3	9	Brandon Jones	JR Motorsports	Chevrolet	8
4	20	John Hunter Nemechek (P)	Joe Gibbs Racing	Toyota	7
5	19	Trevor Bayne	Joe Gibbs Racing	Toyota	6
6	16	Chandler Smith (R) (P)	Kaulig Racing	Chevrolet	5
7	48	Parker Kilgerman (P)	Big Machine Racing	Chevrolet	4
8	1	Sam Mayer (P)	JR Motorsports	Chevrolet	3
9	88	Dale Earnhardt Jr.	JR Motorsports	Chevrolet	2
10	18	Sammy Smith (R) (P)	Joe Gibbs Racing	Toyota	1

Stage 2 Laps: 85

Pos.	#	Driver	Team	Make	Pts
1	7	Justin Allgaier (P)	JR Motorsports	Chevrolet	10
2	00	Cole Custer (P)	Stewart-Haas Racing	Ford	9
3	21	Austin Hill (P)	Richard Childress Racing	Chevrolet	8
4	88	Dale Earnhardt Jr.	JR Motorsports	Chevrolet	7
5	19	Trevor Bayne	Joe Gibbs Racing	Toyota	6
6	20	John Hunter Nemechek (P)	Joe Gibbs Racing	Toyota	5
7	10	Daniel Hemric (P)	Kaulig Racing	Chevrolet	4
8	98	Riley Herbst	Stewart-Haas Racing	Ford	3
9	16	Chandler Smith (R) (P)	Kaulig Racing	Chevrolet	2
10	45	Jeffrey Earnhardt	Alpha Prime Racing	Chevrolet	1

Stage 3 Laps: 130

Pos.	St	#	Driver	Team	Make	Laps	Led	Status	Pts
1	10	7	Justin Allgaier (P)	JR Motorsports	Chevrolet	300	110	Running	59
2	5	10	Daniel Hemric (P)	Kaulig Racing	Chevrolet	300	33	Running	39
3	3	20	John Hunter Nemechek (P)	Joe Gibbs Racing	Toyota	300	1	Running	46
4	1	00	Cole Custer (P)	Stewart-Haas Racing	Ford	300	109	Running	52
5	4	16	Chandler Smith (R) (P)	Kaulig Racing	Chevrolet	300	0	Running	39
6	7	39	Ryan Sieg	RSS Racing	Ford	300	0	Running	31
7	12	19	Trevor Bayne	Joe Gibbs Racing	Toyota	300	0	Running	42
8	16	98	Riley Herbst	Stewart-Haas Racing	Ford	300	0	Running	32
9	6	18	Sammy Smith (R) (P)	Joe Gibbs Racing	Toyota	300	0	Running	29
10	31	26	Kaz Grala	Sam Hunt Racing	Toyota	300	0	Running	27
11	21	2	Sheldon Creed (P)	Richard Childress Racing	Chevrolet	300	0	Running	26
12	18	11	Derek Kraus	Kaulig Racing	Chevrolet	300	0	Running	25
13	38	27	Jeb Burton (P)	Jordan Anderson Racing	Chevrolet	300	0	Running	24
14	29	24	Connor Mosack (R)	Sam Hunt Racing	Toyota	300	0	Running	23
15	14	31	Parker Retzlaff (R)	Jordan Anderson Racing	Chevrolet	299	0	Running	22
16	36	25	Brett Moffitt	AM Racing	Ford	299	0	Running	21
17	25	44	Rajah Caruth (i)	Alpha Prime Racing	Chevrolet	298	0	Running	0
18	22	43	Ryan Ellis	Alpha Prime Racing	Chevrolet	298	0	Running	19
19	35	07	Stefan Parsons	SS-Green Light Racing	Chevrolet	298	0	Running	18
20	20	92	Josh Williams	DGM Racing	Chevrolet	298	0	Running	17
21	27	28	Kyle Sieg	RSS Racing	Ford	298	0	Running	16
22	28	6	Brennan Poole	JD Motorsports	Chevrolet	297	0	Running	15
23	30	4	Kyle Weatherman	JD Motorsports	Chevrolet	297	0	Running	14
24	9	51	Jeremy Clements	Jeremy Clements Racing	Chevrolet	297	0	Running	13
25	32	78	Anthony Alfredo	B. J. McLeod Motorsports	Chevrolet	296	0	Running	12
26	19	38	Joe Graf Jr.	RSS Racing	Ford	295	0	Running	11
27	24	91	Josh Bilicki	DGM Racing	Chevrolet	294	0	Running	10
28	33	02	Blaine Perkins (R)	Our Motorsports	Chevrolet	294	0	Running	9
29	23	08	Chad Finchum	SS-Green Light Racing	Ford	276	0	Running	8
30	15	88	Dale Earnhardt Jr.	JR Motorsports	Chevrolet	271	47	Ignition	16
31	13	48	Parker Kligerman (P)	Big Machine Racing	Chevrolet	246	0	Running	10
32	17	45	Jeffrey Earnhardt	Alpha Prime Racing	Chevrolet	229	0	Brakes	6
33	26	21	Austin Hill (P)	Richard Childress Racing	Chevrolet	217	0	DVP	12
34	8	9	Brandon Jones	JR Motorsports	Chevrolet	178	0	Suspension	11
35	11	1	Sam Mayer (P)	JR Motorsports	Chevrolet	166	0	Accident	5
36	2	8	Josh Berry (P)	JR Motorsports	Chevrolet	166	0	Accident	1
37	37	35	B. J. McLeod	Emerling-Gase Motorsports	Chevrolet	117	0	Power	1
38	34	66	Timmy Hill (i)	MBM Motorsports	Toyota	81	0	Rear Gear	0
Official race results

== Standings after the race ==
Drivers' Championship standings

	Pos	Driver	Points
	1	John Hunter Nemechek	2,095
1	2	Justin Allgaier	2,085 (-10)
1	3	Cole Custer	2,069 (–26)
2	4	Austin Hill	2,051 (–44)
1	5	Chandler Smith	2,048 (–47)
5	6	Daniel Hemric	2,042 (–53)
1	7	Sammy Smith	2,035 (–60)
	8	Sheldon Creed	2,034 (–61)
1	9	Jeb Burton	2,030 (–65)
1	10	Sam Mayer	2,020 (–75)
1	11	Parker Kligerman	2,012 (–83)
5	12	Josh Berry	2,010 (–85)
Official driver's standings

- Note: Only the first 12 positions are included for the driver standings.

Previous race: 2023 Kansas Lottery 300	NASCAR Xfinity Series; 2023 season	Next race: 2023 Andy's Frozen Custard 300
