= 2023 Cabo Wabo 250 =

21st race of the 2023 NASCAR Xfinity Series

Race details
- Race 21 of 33 of the 2023 NASCAR Xfinity Series
- Date: August 5, 2023
- Official name: 31st Annual Cabo Wabo 250
- Location: Michigan International Speedway, Brooklyn, Michigan
- Course: Permanent racing facility
- Course length: 2.0 miles (3.2 km)
- Distance: 125 laps, 250 mi (400 km)
- Scheduled distance: 125 laps, 250 mi (400 km)
- Average speed: 124.931 mph (201.057 km/h)

Pole position
| Driver | Josh Berry | JR Motorsports |
- Time: 37.985

Most laps led
| Driver | John Hunter Nemechek | Joe Gibbs Racing |
- Laps: 65

Winner
| No. 20 | John Hunter Nemechek | Joe Gibbs Racing |

Television in the United States
- Network: NBC
- Announcers: Rick Allen, Jeff Burton, Dale Jarrett, and Dale Earnhardt Jr.

Radio in the United States
- Radio: MRN

The 2023 Cabo Wabo 250 was the 21st stock car race of the 2023 NASCAR Xfinity Series, and the 31st iteration of the event. The race was held on Saturday, August 5, 2023, in Brooklyn, Michigan at Michigan International Speedway, a 2.0 miles (3.2 km) permanent quad-oval shaped racetrack. The race took the scheduled 125 laps to complete. John Hunter Nemechek, driving for Joe Gibbs Racing, would take advantage of a late-race restart, and hold off the rest of the field to earn his seventh career NASCAR Xfinity Series win, and his fifth of the season. Nemechek would also dominate the majority of the race, leading a race-high 65 laps. To fill out the podium, Josh Berry and Brandon Jones, both driving for JR Motorsports, would finish 2nd and 3rd, respectively.

== Background ==
Michigan International Speedway is a two-mile (3.2 km) moderate-banked D-shaped speedway located in Brooklyn, Michigan. The track is used primarily for NASCAR events. It is known as a "sister track" to Texas World Speedway as MIS's oval design was a direct basis of TWS, with moderate modifications to the banking in the corners, and was used as the basis of Auto Club Speedway. The track is owned by International Speedway Corporation. Michigan International Speedway is recognized as one of motorsports' premier facilities because of its wide racing surface and high banking (by open-wheel standards; the 18-degree banking is modest by stock car standards).

=== Entry list ===
- (R) denotes rookie driver.
- (i) denotes driver who is ineligible for series driver points.

| # | Driver | Team | Make |
|---|---|---|---|
| 00 | Cole Custer | Stewart-Haas Racing | Ford |
| 1 | Sam Mayer | JR Motorsports | Chevrolet |
| 02 | Blaine Perkins (R) | Our Motorsports | Chevrolet |
| 2 | Sheldon Creed | Richard Childress Racing | Chevrolet |
| 4 | Garrett Smithley | JD Motorsports | Chevrolet |
| 6 | Brennan Poole | JD Motorsports | Chevrolet |
| 07 | Stefan Parsons | SS-Green Light Racing | Chevrolet |
| 7 | Justin Allgaier | JR Motorsports | Chevrolet |
| 08 | Mason Maggio (i) | SS-Green Light Racing | Ford |
| 8 | Josh Berry | JR Motorsports | Chevrolet |
| 9 | Brandon Jones | JR Motorsports | Chevrolet |
| 10 | Ross Chastain (i) | Kaulig Racing | Chevrolet |
| 11 | Daniel Hemric | Kaulig Racing | Chevrolet |
| 16 | Chandler Smith (R) | Kaulig Racing | Chevrolet |
| 18 | Sammy Smith (R) | Joe Gibbs Racing | Toyota |
| 19 | Ty Gibbs (i) | Joe Gibbs Racing | Toyota |
| 20 | John Hunter Nemechek | Joe Gibbs Racing | Toyota |
| 21 | Austin Hill | Richard Childress Racing | Chevrolet |
| 24 | Connor Mosack (R) | Sam Hunt Racing | Toyota |
| 25 | Brett Moffitt | AM Racing | Ford |
| 26 | Kaz Grala | Sam Hunt Racing | Toyota |
| 27 | Jeb Burton | Jordan Anderson Racing | Chevrolet |
| 28 | Kyle Sieg | RSS Racing | Ford |
| 31 | Parker Retzlaff (R) | Jordan Anderson Racing | Chevrolet |
| 35 | Patrick Emerling | Emerling-Gase Motorsports | Ford |
| 38 | Joe Graf Jr. | RSS Racing | Ford |
| 39 | Ryan Sieg | RSS Racing | Ford |
| 43 | Ryan Ellis | Alpha Prime Racing | Chevrolet |
| 44 | Mason Massey | Alpha Prime Racing | Chevrolet |
| 45 | Jeffrey Earnhardt | Alpha Prime Racing | Chevrolet |
| 48 | Parker Kligerman | Big Machine Racing | Chevrolet |
| 51 | Jeremy Clements | Jeremy Clements Racing | Chevrolet |
| 53 | C. J. McLaughlin | Emerling-Gase Motorsports | Chevrolet |
| 66 | Sage Karam | MBM Motorsports | Ford |
| 74 | Dawson Cram | CHK Racing | Chevrolet |
| 77 | Carson Hocevar (i) | Spire Motorsports | Chevrolet |
| 78 | Anthony Alfredo | B. J. McLeod Motorsports | Chevrolet |
| 91 | Kyle Weatherman | DGM Racing | Chevrolet |
| 92 | Josh Williams | DGM Racing | Chevrolet |
| 98 | Riley Herbst | Stewart-Haas Racing | Ford |
Official entry list

== Practice ==
The first and only practice session was held on Friday, August 4, at 3:35 PM EST, and would last for 20 minutes. Justin Allgaier, driving for JR Motorsports, would set the fastest time in the session, with a lap of 38.875, and an average speed of 185.209 mph (298.065 km/h).

| Pos. | # | Driver | Team | Make | Time | Speed |
|---|---|---|---|---|---|---|
| 1 | 7 | Justin Allgaier | JR Motorsports | Chevrolet | 38.875 | 185.209 |
| 2 | 18 | Sammy Smith (R) | Joe Gibbs Racing | Toyota | 39.056 | 184.351 |
| 3 | 19 | Ty Gibbs (i) | Joe Gibbs Racing | Toyota | 39.067 | 184.299 |
Full practice results

== Qualifying ==
Qualifying was held on Friday, August 4, at 4:05 PM EST. Since Michigan International Speedway is a superspeedway, the qualifying system used is a single-car, one-lap system with only one round. In that round, whoever sets the fastest time will win the pole. Josh Berry, driving for JR Motorsports, would score the pole for the race, with a lap of 37.985, and an average speed of 189.549 mph (305.050 km/h).

| Pos. | # | Driver | Team | Make | Time | Speed |
|---|---|---|---|---|---|---|
| 1 | 8 | Josh Berry | JR Motorsports | Chevrolet | 37.985 | 189.549 |
| 2 | 7 | Justin Allgaier | JR Motorsports | Chevrolet | 38.239 | 188.289 |
| 3 | 21 | Austin Hill | Richard Childress Racing | Chevrolet | 38.261 | 188.181 |
| 4 | 1 | Sam Mayer | JR Motorsports | Chevrolet | 38.303 | 187.975 |
| 5 | 98 | Riley Herbst | Stewart-Haas Racing | Ford | 38.314 | 187.921 |
| 6 | 16 | Chandler Smith (R) | Kaulig Racing | Chevrolet | 38.329 | 187.847 |
| 7 | 77 | Carson Hocevar (i) | Spire Motorsports | Chevrolet | 38.362 | 187.686 |
| 8 | 19 | Ty Gibbs (i) | Joe Gibbs Racing | Toyota | 38.382 | 187.588 |
| 9 | 18 | Sammy Smith (R) | Joe Gibbs Racing | Toyota | 38.433 | 187.339 |
| 10 | 20 | John Hunter Nemechek | Joe Gibbs Racing | Toyota | 38.454 | 187.237 |
| 11 | 10 | Ross Chastain (i) | Kaulig Racing | Chevrolet | 38.454 | 187.237 |
| 12 | 25 | Brett Moffitt | AM Racing | Ford | 38.454 | 187.237 |
| 13 | 00 | Cole Custer | Stewart-Haas Racing | Ford | 38.471 | 187.154 |
| 14 | 9 | Brandon Jones | JR Motorsports | Chevrolet | 38.531 | 186.863 |
| 15 | 2 | Sheldon Creed | Richard Childress Racing | Chevrolet | 38.552 | 186.761 |
| 16 | 11 | Daniel Hemric | Kaulig Racing | Chevrolet | 38.554 | 186.751 |
| 17 | 48 | Parker Kligerman | Big Machine Racing | Chevrolet | 38.564 | 186.703 |
| 18 | 78 | Anthony Alfredo | B. J. McLeod Motorsports | Chevrolet | 38.642 | 186.326 |
| 19 | 24 | Connor Mosack (R) | Sam Hunt Racing | Toyota | 38.643 | 186.321 |
| 20 | 91 | Kyle Weatherman | DGM Racing | Chevrolet | 38.691 | 186.090 |
| 21 | 28 | Kyle Sieg | RSS Racing | Ford | 38.749 | 185.811 |
| 22 | 39 | Ryan Sieg | RSS Racing | Ford | 38.755 | 185.782 |
| 23 | 27 | Jeb Burton | Jordan Anderson Racing | Chevrolet | 38.799 | 185.572 |
| 24 | 31 | Parker Retzlaff (R) | Jordan Anderson Racing | Chevrolet | 38.823 | 185.457 |
| 25 | 26 | Kaz Grala | Sam Hunt Racing | Toyota | 38.883 | 185.171 |
| 26 | 4 | Garrett Smithley | JD Motorsports | Chevrolet | 39.001 | 184.611 |
| 27 | 51 | Jeremy Clements | Jeremy Clements Racing | Chevrolet | 39.035 | 184.450 |
| 28 | 38 | Joe Graf Jr. | RSS Racing | Ford | 39.199 | 183.678 |
| 29 | 92 | Josh Williams | DGM Racing | Chevrolet | 39.290 | 183.253 |
| 30 | 07 | Stefan Parsons | SS-Green Light Racing | Chevrolet | 39.409 | 182.699 |
| 31 | 08 | Mason Maggio (i) | SS-Green Light Racing | Ford | 39.451 | 182.505 |
| 32 | 74 | Dawson Cram | CHK Racing | Chevrolet | 39.471 | 182.412 |
| 33 | 66 | Sage Karam | MBM Motorsports | Ford | 39.494 | 182.306 |
Qualified by owner's points
| 34 | 45 | Jeffrey Earnhardt | Alpha Prime Racing | Chevrolet | 39.601 | 181.814 |
| 35 | 43 | Ryan Ellis | Alpha Prime Racing | Chevrolet | 39.619 | 181.731 |
| 36 | 35 | Patrick Emerling | Emerling-Gase Motorsports | Ford | 39.626 | 181.699 |
| 37 | 6 | Brennan Poole | JD Motorsports | Chevrolet | 39.644 | 181.616 |
| 38 | 02 | Blaine Perkins (R) | Our Motorsports | Chevrolet | 39.826 | 180.786 |
Failed to qualify
| 39 | 44 | Mason Massey | Alpha Prime Racing | Chevrolet | 39.502 | 182.269 |
| 40 | 53 | C. J. McLaughlin | Emerling-Gase Motorsports | Chevrolet | 39.742 | 181.169 |
Official qualifying results
Official starting lineup

== Race results ==
Stage 1 Laps: 30

| Pos. | # | Driver | Team | Make | Pts |
|---|---|---|---|---|---|
| 1 | 7 | Justin Allgaier | JR Motorsports | Chevrolet | 10 |
| 2 | 8 | Josh Berry | JR Motorsports | Chevrolet | 9 |
| 3 | 00 | Cole Custer | Stewart-Haas Racing | Ford | 8 |
| 4 | 16 | Chandler Smith (R) | Kaulig Racing | Chevrolet | 7 |
| 5 | 98 | Riley Herbst | Stewart-Haas Racing | Ford | 6 |
| 6 | 9 | Brandon Jones | JR Motorsports | Chevrolet | 5 |
| 7 | 21 | Austin Hill | Richard Childress Racing | Chevrolet | 4 |
| 8 | 39 | Ryan Sieg | RSS Racing | Ford | 3 |
| 9 | 1 | Sam Mayer | JR Motorsports | Chevrolet | 2 |
| 10 | 78 | Anthony Alfredo | B. J. McLeod Motorsports | Chevrolet | 1 |

Stage 2 Laps: 30

| Pos. | # | Driver | Team | Make | Pts |
|---|---|---|---|---|---|
| 1 | 20 | John Hunter Nemechek | Joe Gibbs Racing | Toyota | 10 |
| 2 | 7 | Justin Allgaier | JR Motorsports | Chevrolet | 9 |
| 3 | 19 | Ty Gibbs (i) | Joe Gibbs Racing | Toyota | 0 |
| 4 | 98 | Riley Herbst | Stewart-Haas Racing | Ford | 7 |
| 5 | 21 | Austin Hill | Richard Childress Racing | Chevrolet | 6 |
| 6 | 00 | Cole Custer | Stewart-Haas Racing | Ford | 5 |
| 7 | 8 | Josh Berry | JR Motorsports | Chevrolet | 4 |
| 8 | 1 | Sam Mayer | JR Motorsports | Chevrolet | 3 |
| 9 | 9 | Brandon Jones | JR Motorsports | Chevrolet | 2 |
| 10 | 25 | Brett Moffitt | AM Racing | Ford | 1 |

Stage 3 Laps: 65

| Pos. | St | # | Driver | Team | Make | Laps | Led | Status | Pts |
|---|---|---|---|---|---|---|---|---|---|
| 1 | 10 | 20 | John Hunter Nemechek | Joe Gibbs Racing | Toyota | 125 | 65 | Running | 50 |
| 2 | 1 | 8 | Josh Berry | JR Motorsports | Chevrolet | 125 | 0 | Running | 48 |
| 3 | 14 | 9 | Brandon Jones | JR Motorsports | Chevrolet | 125 | 0 | Running | 41 |
| 4 | 8 | 19 | Ty Gibbs (i) | Joe Gibbs Racing | Toyota | 125 | 22 | Running | 0 |
| 5 | 4 | 1 | Sam Mayer | JR Motorsports | Chevrolet | 125 | 0 | Running | 37 |
| 6 | 5 | 98 | Riley Herbst | Stewart-Haas Racing | Ford | 125 | 1 | Running | 44 |
| 7 | 11 | 10 | Ross Chastain (i) | Kaulig Racing | Chevrolet | 125 | 0 | Running | 0 |
| 8 | 17 | 48 | Parker Kligerman | Big Machine Racing | Chevrolet | 125 | 0 | Running | 29 |
| 9 | 24 | 31 | Parker Retzlaff (R) | Jordan Anderson Racing | Chevrolet | 125 | 0 | Running | 28 |
| 10 | 23 | 27 | Jeb Burton | Jordan Anderson Racing | Chevrolet | 125 | 0 | Running | 27 |
| 11 | 3 | 21 | Austin Hill | Richard Childress Racing | Chevrolet | 125 | 0 | Running | 36 |
| 12 | 15 | 2 | Sheldon Creed | Richard Childress Racing | Chevrolet | 125 | 0 | Running | 25 |
| 13 | 22 | 39 | Ryan Sieg | RSS Racing | Ford | 125 | 0 | Running | 27 |
| 14 | 2 | 7 | Justin Allgaier | JR Motorsports | Chevrolet | 125 | 32 | Running | 42 |
| 15 | 16 | 11 | Daniel Hemric | Kaulig Racing | Chevrolet | 125 | 0 | Running | 22 |
| 16 | 13 | 00 | Cole Custer | Stewart-Haas Racing | Ford | 125 | 0 | Running | 34 |
| 17 | 12 | 25 | Brett Moffitt | AM Racing | Ford | 125 | 4 | Running | 21 |
| 18 | 18 | 78 | Anthony Alfredo | B. J. McLeod Motorsports | Chevrolet | 125 | 0 | Running | 20 |
| 19 | 21 | 28 | Kyle Sieg | RSS Racing | Ford | 125 | 0 | Running | 18 |
| 20 | 6 | 16 | Chandler Smith (R) | Kaulig Racing | Chevrolet | 125 | 0 | Running | 24 |
| 21 | 25 | 26 | Kaz Grala | Sam Hunt Racing | Toyota | 124 | 0 | Running | 16 |
| 22 | 29 | 92 | Josh Williams | DGM Racing | Chevrolet | 124 | 0 | Running | 15 |
| 23 | 35 | 43 | Ryan Ellis | Alpha Prime Racing | Chevrolet | 124 | 0 | Running | 14 |
| 24 | 34 | 45 | Jeffrey Earnhardt | Alpha Prime Racing | Chevrolet | 124 | 0 | Running | 13 |
| 25 | 33 | 66 | Sage Karam | MBM Motorsports | Ford | 124 | 1 | Running | 12 |
| 26 | 27 | 51 | Jeremy Clements | Jeremy Clements Racing | Chevrolet | 124 | 0 | Running | 11 |
| 27 | 28 | 38 | Joe Graf Jr. | RSS Racing | Ford | 124 | 0 | Running | 10 |
| 28 | 32 | 74 | Dawson Cram | CHK Racing | Chevrolet | 124 | 0 | Running | 9 |
| 29 | 37 | 6 | Brennan Poole | JD Motorsports | Chevrolet | 123 | 0 | Running | 8 |
| 30 | 26 | 4 | Garrett Smithley | JD Motorsports | Chevrolet | 123 | 0 | Running | 7 |
| 31 | 30 | 07 | Stefan Parsons | SS-Green Light Racing | Chevrolet | 123 | 0 | Running | 6 |
| 32 | 7 | 77 | Carson Hocevar (i) | Spire Motorsports | Chevrolet | 123 | 0 | Running | 0 |
| 33 | 38 | 02 | Blaine Perkins (R) | Our Motorsports | Chevrolet | 123 | 0 | Running | 4 |
| 34 | 36 | 35 | Patrick Emerling | Emerling-Gase Motorsports | Ford | 120 | 0 | Running | 3 |
| 35 | 20 | 91 | Kyle Weatherman | DGM Racing | Chevrolet | 91 | 0 | Electrical | 2 |
| 36 | 19 | 24 | Connor Mosack (R) | Sam Hunt Racing | Toyota | 39 | 0 | Accident | 1 |
| 37 | 31 | 08 | Mason Maggio (i) | SS-Green Light Racing | Ford | 16 | 0 | Accident | 0 |
| 38 | 9 | 18 | Sammy Smith (R) | Joe Gibbs Racing | Toyota | 11 | 0 | Accident | 1 |
Official race results

== Standings after the race ==
Drivers' Championship standings

| | Pos | Driver | Points |
|---|---|---|---|
| 1 | 1 | John Hunter Nemechek | 811 |
| 1 | 2 | Austin Hill | 811 (-0) |
| | 3 | Justin Allgaier | 777 (–34) |
| | 4 | Cole Custer | 725 (–86) |
| | 5 | Josh Berry | 660 (–151) |
| | 6 | Sam Mayer | 630 (–181) |
| | 7 | Chandler Smith | 612 (–199) |
| | 8 | Daniel Hemric | 601 (–210) |
| 1 | 9 | Riley Herbst | 574 (–237) |
| 1 | 10 | Sammy Smith | 558 (–253) |
| | 11 | Sheldon Creed | 552 (–259) |
| | 12 | Parker Kligerman | 534 (–277) |
Official driver's standings

- Note: Only the first 12 positions are included for the driver standings.

| Previous race: 2023 Road America 180 | NASCAR Xfinity Series; 2023 season | Next race: 2023 Pennzoil 150 |
