= 2024 Sport Clips Haircuts VFW 200 =

23rd race of the 2024 NASCAR Xfinity Series

Race details
- Race 23 of 33 of the 2024 NASCAR Xfinity Series
- Date: August 31, 2024
- Official name: 42nd Annual Sport Clips Haircuts VFW Help a Hero 200
- Location: Darlington Raceway in Darlington, South Carolina
- Course: Permanent racing facility
- Course length: 1.366 miles (2.198 km)
- Distance: 150 laps, 204 mi (329 km)
- Scheduled distance: 147 laps, 200 mi (323 km)
- Average speed: 110.94 mph (178.54 km/h)

Pole position
Driver	Christopher Bell	Joe Gibbs Racing
- Time: 29.828

Most laps led
Driver	Christopher Bell	Joe Gibbs Racing
- Laps: 108

Winner
No. 20	Christopher Bell	Joe Gibbs Racing

Television in the United States
- Network: USA
- Announcers: Rick Allen, Jeff Burton, and Steve Letarte

Radio in the United States
- Radio: MRN

The 2024 Sport Clips Haircuts VFW Help a Hero 200 was the 23rd stock car race of the 2024 NASCAR Xfinity Series, and the 42nd iteration of the event. The race was held on Saturday, August 31, 2024, at Darlington Raceway in Darlington, South Carolina, a 1.366 miles (2.198 km) permanent egg-shaped racetrack. The race was scheduled to be contested over 147 laps but was extended to 150 laps due to an overtime finish. Christopher Bell, driving for Joe Gibbs Racing, would stay consistent throughout the race, after scoring the pole, leading 108 laps and winning after leading when A. J. Allmendinger got a flat tire on the final lap, bringing out the caution. This was Bell's nineteenth career NASCAR Xfinity Series win, and his second of the season. To fill out the podium, Cole Custer, driving for Stewart-Haas Racing, and Sheldon Creed, driving for Joe Gibbs Racing, would finish 2nd and 3rd, respectively.

== Report ==
=== Background ===
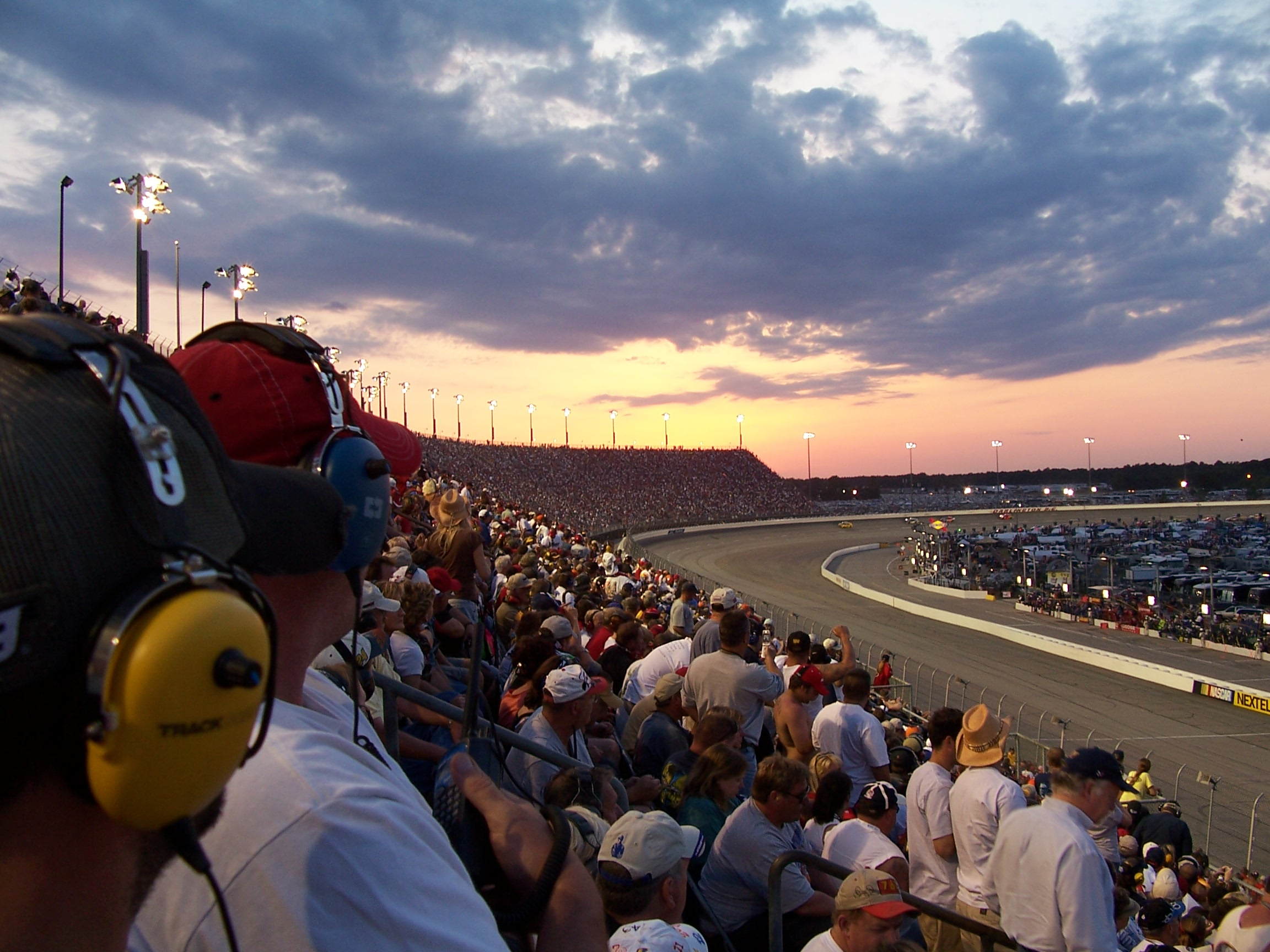
Darlington Raceway, the circuit where the race was held.

Darlington Raceway is a race track built for NASCAR racing located near Darlington, South Carolina. It is nicknamed "The Lady in Black" and "The Track Too Tough to Tame" by many NASCAR fans and drivers and advertised as "A NASCAR Tradition." It is of a unique, somewhat egg-shaped design, an oval with the ends of very different configurations, a condition which supposedly arose from the proximity of one end of the track to a minnow pond the owner refused to relocate. This situation makes it very challenging for the crews to set up their cars' handling in a way that is effective at both ends.

=== Surface issues ===
Darlington Raceway was last repaved following the May 2007 meeting (from 2005 to 2019, there was only one meeting; the second meeting was reinstated in 2020), and from 2008 to 2019, there was one night race. In 2020, a day race returned to the schedule, and instead of two races (one Xfinity and one Cup) during the entire year, the track hosted six races (three Cup, two Xfinity, and one Truck). The circuit kept repairing the circuit with patches during each summer before the annual Cup race in September. The circuit's narrow Turn 2 rapidly deteriorated with cracks in the tarmac allowing water to seep in the circuit. In July 2021, the circuit repaved a six hundred foot section at the entrance of Turn 2 and ending at the exit of the turn to repair the tarmac and resolve the issue for safety and to reduce the threat of weepers and surface issues in that section of the circuit.

==== Entry list ====
- (R) denotes rookie driver.
- (i) denotes driver who is ineligible for series driver points.

#	Driver	Team	Make
00	Cole Custer	Stewart–Haas Racing	Ford
1	Sam Mayer	JR Motorsports	Chevrolet
2	Jesse Love (R)	Richard Childress Racing	Chevrolet
5	Anthony Alfredo	Our Motorsports	Chevrolet
07	Greg Van Alst	SS-Green Light Racing	Chevrolet
7	Justin Allgaier	JR Motorsports	Chevrolet
8	Sammy Smith	JR Motorsports	Chevrolet
9	Brandon Jones	JR Motorsports	Chevrolet
11	Josh Williams	Kaulig Racing	Chevrolet
14	Chad Finchum	SS-Green Light Racing	Ford
15	Joey Logano (i)	AM Racing	Ford
16	A. J. Allmendinger	Kaulig Racing	Chevrolet
17	Chase Elliott (i)	Hendrick Motorsports	Chevrolet
18	Sheldon Creed	Joe Gibbs Racing	Toyota
19	Joe Graf Jr.	Joe Gibbs Racing	Toyota
20	Christopher Bell (i)	Joe Gibbs Racing	Toyota
21	Austin Hill	Richard Childress Racing	Chevrolet
26	Corey Heim (i)	Sam Hunt Racing	Toyota
27	Jeb Burton	Jordan Anderson Racing	Chevrolet
28	Kyle Sieg	RSS Racing	Ford
29	Blaine Perkins	RSS Racing	Ford
30	Noah Gragson (i)	Rette Jones Racing	Ford
31	Parker Retzlaff	Jordan Anderson Racing	Chevrolet
35	David Starr	Joey Gase Motorsports	Chevrolet
38	Matt DiBenedetto	RSS Racing	Ford
39	Ryan Sieg	RSS Racing	Ford
42	Leland Honeyman (R)	Young's Motorsports	Chevrolet
43	Ryan Ellis	Alpha Prime Racing	Chevrolet
44	Brennan Poole	Alpha Prime Racing	Chevrolet
45	Garrett Smithley	Alpha Prime Racing	Chevrolet
48	Parker Kligerman	Big Machine Racing	Chevrolet
51	Jeremy Clements	Jeremy Clements Racing	Chevrolet
74	Dawson Cram (i)	Mike Harmon Racing	Chevrolet
81	Chandler Smith	Joe Gibbs Racing	Toyota
88	Carson Kvapil	JR Motorsports	Toyota
91	Kyle Weatherman	DGM Racing	Chevrolet
92	Ross Chastain (i)	DGM Racing	Chevrolet
97	Shane van Gisbergen (R)	Kaulig Racing	Chevrolet
98	Riley Herbst	Stewart–Haas Racing	Ford
Official entry list

== Practice ==
The first and only practice session was held on Saturday, August 31, at 10:35 AM EST, and would last for 20 minutes. Austin Hill, driving for Richard Childress Racing, would set the fastest time in the session, with a lap of 30.013, and a speed of 163.603 mph (263.294 km/h).

Pos.	#	Driver	Team	Make	Time	Speed
1	21	Austin Hill	Richard Childress Racing	Chevrolet	30.013	163.849
2	30	Noah Gragson (i)	Rette Jones Racing	Ford	30.058	163.604
3	31	Parker Retzlaff	Jordan Anderson Racing	Chevrolet	30.073	163.522
Full practice results

== Qualifying ==
Qualifying was held on Saturday, August 31, at 11:05 AM EST. Since Darlington Raceway is an intermediate racetrack, the qualifying system used is a single-car, one-lap system with only one round. Drivers will be on track by themselves and will have one lap to post a qualifying time, and whoever sets the fastest time will win the pole.

Christopher Bell, driving for Joe Gibbs Racing, would score the pole for the race, with a lap of 29.828, and a speed of 164.865 mph (265.324 km/h).

Dawson Cram was the only driver who failed to qualify.

=== Qualifying results ===
Pos.	#	Driver	Team	Make	Time	Speed
1	20	Christopher Bell (i)	Joe Gibbs Racing	Toyota	29.828	164.865
2	18	Sheldon Creed	Joe Gibbs Racing	Toyota	29.925	164.331
3	1	Sam Mayer	JR Motorsports	Chevrolet	29.965	164.111
4	16	A. J. Allmendinger	Kaulig Racing	Chevrolet	30.119	163.272
5	81	Chandler Smith	Joe Gibbs Racing	Toyota	30.159	163.056
6	21	Austin Hill	Richard Childress Racing	Chevrolet	30.164	163.029
7	9	Brandon Jones	JR Motorsports	Chevrolet	30.178	162.953
8	98	Riley Herbst	Stewart–Haas Racing	Ford	30.261	162.506
9	31	Parker Retzlaff	Jordan Anderson Racing	Chevrolet	30.278	162.415
10	48	Parker Kligerman	Big Machine Racing	Chevrolet	30.280	162.404
11	8	Sammy Smith	JR Motorsports	Chevrolet	30.285	162.377
12	26	Corey Heim (i)	Sam Hunt Racing	Toyota	30.329	162.142
13	39	Ryan Sieg	RSS Racing	Ford	30.372	161.912
14	5	Anthony Alfredo	Our Motorsports	Chevrolet	30.404	161.742
15	19	Joe Graf Jr.	Joe Gibbs Racing	Toyota	30.451	161.492
16	17	Chase Elliott (i)	Hendrick Motorsports	Chevrolet	30.451	161.492
17	27	Jeb Burton	Jordan Anderson Racing	Chevrolet	30.461	161.439
18	15	Joey Logano (i)	AM Racing	Ford	30.466	161.413
19	91	Kyle Weatherman	DGM Racing	Chevrolet	30.490	161.286
20	7	Justin Allgaier	JR Motorsports	Chevrolet	30.512	161.169
21	00	Cole Custer	Stewart–Haas Racing	Ford	30.513	161.164
22	38	Matt DiBenedetto	RSS Racing	Ford	30.538	161.032
23	2	Jesse Love (R)	Richard Childress Racing	Chevrolet	30.633	160.533
24	92	Ross Chastain (i)	DGM Racing	Chevrolet	30.700	160.182
25	51	Jeremy Clements	Jeremy Clements Racing	Chevrolet	30.747	159.938
26	97	Shane van Gisbergen (R)	Kaulig Racing	Chevrolet	30.751	159.917
27	88	Carson Kvapil	JR Motorsports	Chevrolet	30.753	159.906
28	44	Brennan Poole	Alpha Prime Racing	Chevrolet	30.803	159.647
29	30	Noah Gragson (i)	Rette Jones Racing	Ford	30.834	159.486
30	11	Josh Williams	Kaulig Racing	Chevrolet	30.991	158.678
31	28	Kyle Sieg	RSS Racing	Ford	31.023	158.515
32	29	Blaine Perkins	RSS Racing	Ford	31.073	158.260
33	42	Leland Honeyman (R)	Young's Motorsports	Chevrolet	31.137	157.934
Qualified by owner's points
34	43	Ryan Ellis	Alpha Prime Racing	Chevrolet	31.361	156.806
35	35	David Starr	Joey Gase Motorsports	Chevrolet	31.390	156.661
36	45	Garrett Smithley	Alpha Prime Racing	Chevrolet	31.424	156.492
37	14	Chad Finchum	SS-Green Light Racing	Ford	31.445	156.387
38	07	Greg Van Alst	SS-Green Light Racing	Chevrolet	31.798	154.651
Failed to qualify
39	74	Dawson Cram (i)	Mike Harmon Racing	Chevrolet	31.650	155.374
Official qualifying results
Official starting lineup

== Race results ==
Stage 1 Laps: 45

Pos.	#	Driver	Team	Make	Pts
1	20	Christopher Bell (i)	Joe Gibbs Racing	Toyota	0
2	21	Austin Hill	Richard Childress Racing	Chevrolet	9
3	16	A. J. Allmendinger	Kaulig Racing	Chevrolet	8
4	48	Parker Kligerman	Big Machine Racing	Chevrolet	7
5	18	Sheldon Creed	Joe Gibbs Racing	Toyota	6
6	8	Sammy Smith	JR Motorsports	Chevrolet	5
7	7	Justin Allgaier	JR Motorsports	Chevrolet	4
8	14	Chad Finchum	SS-Green Light Racing	Ford	3
9	00	Cole Custer	Stewart–Haas Racing	Ford	2
10	81	Chandler Smith	Joe Gibbs Racing	Toyota	1

Stage 2 Laps: 45

Pos.	#	Driver	Team	Make	Pts
1	18	Sheldon Creed	Joe Gibbs Racing	Toyota	10
2	20	Christopher Bell (i)	Joe Gibbs Racing	Toyota	0
3	16	A. J. Allmendinger	Kaulig Racing	Chevrolet	8
4	8	Sammy Smith	JR Motorsports	Chevrolet	7
5	7	Justin Allgaier	JR Motorsports	Chevrolet	6
6	00	Cole Custer	Stewart–Haas Racing	Ford	5
7	21	Austin Hill	Richard Childress Racing	Chevrolet	4
8	48	Parker Kligerman	Big Machine Racing	Chevrolet	3
9	30	Noah Gragson (i)	Rette Jones Racing	Ford	0
10	17	Chase Elliott (i)	Hendrick Motorsports	Chevrolet	0

Stage 3 Laps: 57

Pos.	St.	#	Driver	Team	Make	Laps	Led	Status	Pts
1	1	20	Christopher Bell (i)	Joe Gibbs Racing	Toyota	150	108	Running	0
2	21	00	Cole Custer	Stewart-Haas Racing	Ford	150	0	Running	42
3	2	18	Sheldon Creed	Joe Gibbs Racing	Toyota	150	30	Running	50
4	16	17	Chase Elliott (i)	Hendrick Motorsports	Chevrolet	150	0	Running	0
5	11	8	Sammy Smith	JR Motorsports	Chevrolet	150	0	Running	44
6	23	2	Jesse Love (R)	Richard Childress Racing	Chevrolet	150	0	Running	31
7	26	97	Shane Van Gisbergen (R)	Kaulig Racing	Chevrolet	150	0	Running	30
8	5	81	Chandler Smith	Joe Gibbs Racing	Toyota	150	0	Running	30
9	6	21	Austin Hill	Richard Childress Racing	Toyota	150	0	Running	41
10	20	7	Justin Allgaier	JR Motorsports	Chevrolet	150	0	Running	37
11	15	19	Joe Graf Jr.	Joe Gibbs Racing	Toyota	150	0	Running	26
12	24	92	Ross Chastain (i)	DGM Racing	Chevrolet	150	0	Running	0
13	10	48	Parker Kligerman	Big Machine Racing	Chevrolet	150	0	Running	34
14	27	88	Carson Kvapil	JR Motorsports	Chevrolet	150	0	Running	23
15	29	30	Noah Gragson (i)	Rette Jones Racing	Ford	150	0	Running	0
16	30	11	Josh Williams	Kaulig Racing	Chevrolet	150	0	Running	21
17	17	27	Jeb Burton	Jordan Anderson Racing	Chevrolet	150	0	Running	20
18	13	39	Ryan Sieg	RSS Racing	Ford	150	0	Running	19
19	22	38	Matt DiBenedetto	RSS Racing	Ford	150	0	Running	18
20	28	44	Brennan Poole	Alpha Prime Racing	Chevrolet	150	0	Running	17
21	34	43	Ryan Ellis	Alpha Prime Racing	Chevrolet	150	0	Running	16
22	31	28	Kyle Sieg	RSS Racing	Ford	150	0	Running	15
23	33	42	Leland Honeyman (R)	Young's Motorsports	Chevrolet	150	0	Running	14
24	35	35	David Starr	Joey Gase Motorsports	Chevrolet	150	0	Running	13
25	12	26	Corey Heim (i)	Sam Hunt Racing	Toyota	150	0	Running	0
26	14	5	Anthony Alfredo	Our Motorsports	Chevrolet	150	0	Running	11
27	4	16	A.J. Allmendinger	Kaulig Racing	Chevrolet	149	0	Running	26
28	3	1	Sam Mayer	JR Motorsports	Chevrolet	149	11	Running	9
29	38	07	Greg Van Alst	SS-Green Light Racing	Chevrolet	149	0	Running	8
30	36	45	Garrett Smithley	Alpha Prime Racing	Chevrolet	148	1	Running	7
31	25	51	Jeremy Clements	Jeremy Clements Racing	Chevrolet	146	0	Running	6
32	7	9	Brandon Jones	JR Motorsports	Chevrolet	146	0	Running	5
33	37	14	Chad Finchum	SS-Green Light Racing	Ford	142	0	Running	7
34	32	29	Blaine Perkins	RSS Racing	Ford	133	0	Running	3
35	8	98	Riley Herbst	Stewart-Haas Racing	Ford	129	0	Running	2
36	9	31	Parker Retzlaff	Jordan Anderson Racing	Chevrolet	125	0	Running	1
37	19	91	Kyle Weatherman	DGM Racing	Chevrolet	54	0	Accident	1
38	18	15	Joey Logano (i)	AM Racing	Ford	12	0	Engine	0

== Standings after the race ==
Drivers' Championship standings

	Pos	Driver	Points
	1	Justin Allgaier	843
	2	Cole Custer	815 (-28)
	3	Chandler Smith	761 (–82)
	4	Austin Hill	745 (–98)
2	5	Sheldon Creed	704 (–139)
1	6	A. J. Allmendinger	700 (–143)
1	7	Riley Herbst	667 (–176)
	8	Jesse Love	651 (–192)
	9	Parker Kligerman	639 (–204)
1	10	Sammy Smith	605 (–238)
1	11	Ryan Sieg	595 (–248)
	12	Shane van Gisbergen	562 (–281)
Official driver's standings

Manufacturers' Championship standings

Pos	Manufacturer	Points
1	Chevrolet	852
2	Toyota	823 (-29)
3	Ford	743 (–109)

- Note: Only the first 12 positions are included for the driver standings.

Previous race: 2024 Wawa 250	NASCAR Xfinity Series; 2024 season	Next race: 2024 Focused Health 250 (Atlanta)
