= 2023 NASCAR Xfinity Series Championship Race =

33rd race of the 2023 NASCAR Xfinity Series

Race details
- Race 33 of 33 of the 2023 NASCAR Xfinity Series
- Date: November 4, 2023
- Official name: 25th Annual NASCAR Xfinity Series Championship Race
- Location: Phoenix Raceway, Avondale, Arizona
- Course: Permanent racing facility
- Course length: 1 miles (1.6 km)
- Distance: 202 laps, 202 mi (325 km)
- Scheduled distance: 200 laps, 200 mi (320 km)
- Average speed: 90.527 mph (145.689 km/h)

Pole position
Driver	Sammy Smith	Joe Gibbs Racing
- Time: 27.153

Most laps led
Driver	Cole Custer	Stewart–Haas Racing
- Laps: 96

Winner
No. 00	Cole Custer	Stewart–Haas Racing

Television in the United States
- Network: USA
- Announcers: Rick Allen, Jeff Burton, Steve Letarte, and Dale Earnhardt Jr.

Radio in the United States
- Radio: MRN

The 2023 NASCAR Xfinity Series Championship Race was the 33rd and final stock car race of the 2023 NASCAR Xfinity Series, the Championship 4 race, and the 25th iteration of the event. The race was held on Saturday, November 4, 2023, in Avondale, Arizona at Phoenix Raceway, a 1 mile (1.6 km) permanent tri-oval shaped racetrack. The race was originally scheduled to be contested over 200 laps, but was increased to 202 laps, due to a NASCAR overtime finish. In a wild overtime restart, Cole Custer, driving for Stewart–Haas Racing, took advantage of the lead, and held off the rest of the field to earn his 13th career NASCAR Xfinity Series win, and his third of the season. Custer also dominated the race, winning the second stage and leading a race-high 96 laps. To fill out the podium, Sheldon Creed, driving for Richard Childress Racing, and Justin Allgaier, driving for JR Motorsports, finished 2nd and 3rd, respectively.

In addition to winning the race, Custer also claimed the 2023 NASCAR Xfinity Series championship, finishing in two positions ahead of his closest competitor, Justin Allgaier. This was the first championship for Custer after previously finishing second in the standings from 2018 to 2019, and the first championship for Stewart–Haas Racing in the Xfinity Series. Sam Mayer finished in fifth and ranked third in the championship. John Hunter Nemechek had dominated the early stages of the race, leading 66 laps and winning the first stage. He ultimately hit the wall on the final lap and finished 28th while running in the top five; he finished fourth in the championship.

== Background ==
Phoenix Raceway – also known as PIR – is a one-mile, low-banked tri-oval race track located in Avondale, Arizona. It is named after the nearby metropolitan area of Phoenix. The motorsport track opened in 1964 and currently hosts two NASCAR race weekends annually. PIR has also hosted the IndyCar Series, CART, USAC and the Rolex Sports Car Series. The raceway is currently owned and operated by International Speedway Corporation.

The raceway was originally constructed with a 2.5 mi (4.0 km) road course that ran both inside and outside of the main tri-oval. In 1991 the track was reconfigured with the current 1.51 mi (2.43 km) interior layout. PIR has an estimated grandstand seating capacity of around 67,000. Lights were installed around the track in 2004 following the addition of a second annual NASCAR race weekend.

Phoenix Raceway is home to two annual NASCAR race weekends, one of 13 facilities on the NASCAR schedule to host more than one race weekend a year. The track is both the first and last stop in the western United States, as well as the fourth and the last track on the schedule.

=== Championship drivers ===
- Sam Mayer advanced after winning at Homestead–Miami.
- Justin Allgaier advanced after winning at Martinsville.
- John Hunter Nemechek advanced by virtue of points.
- Cole Custer advanced by virtue of points.

=== Entry list ===
- (R) denotes rookie driver.
- (i) denotes driver who is ineligible for series driver points.
- (CC) denotes championship contender.

#	Driver	Team	Make
00	Cole Custer (CC)	Stewart–Haas Racing	Ford
1	Sam Mayer (CC)	JR Motorsports	Chevrolet
02	Blaine Perkins (R)	Our Motorsports	Chevrolet
2	Sheldon Creed	Richard Childress Racing	Chevrolet
4	Stefan Parsons (i)	JD Motorsports	Chevrolet
6	Brennan Poole	JD Motorsports	Chevrolet
07	Dawson Cram	SS-Green Light Racing	Chevrolet
7	Justin Allgaier (CC)	JR Motorsports	Chevrolet
08	J. J. Yeley	SS-Green Light Racing	Ford
8	Josh Berry	JR Motorsports	Chevrolet
9	Brandon Jones	JR Motorsports	Chevrolet
10	Daniel Hemric	Kaulig Racing	Chevrolet
11	Derek Kraus (i)	Kaulig Racing	Chevrolet
16	Chandler Smith (R)	Kaulig Racing	Chevrolet
17	Rajah Caruth (i)	Hendrick Motorsports	Chevrolet
18	Sammy Smith (R)	Joe Gibbs Racing	Toyota
19	Myatt Snider	Joe Gibbs Racing	Toyota
20	John Hunter Nemechek (CC)	Joe Gibbs Racing	Toyota
21	Austin Hill	Richard Childress Racing	Chevrolet
24	Connor Mosack (R)	Sam Hunt Racing	Toyota
25	Brett Moffitt	AM Racing	Ford
26	Kaz Grala	Sam Hunt Racing	Toyota
27	Jeb Burton	Jordan Anderson Racing	Chevrolet
28	Joe Graf Jr.	RSS Racing	Ford
31	Parker Retzlaff (R)	Jordan Anderson Racing	Chevrolet
35	Joey Gase	Emerling-Gase Motorsports	Ford
38	Kyle Sieg	RSS Racing	Ford
39	Ryan Sieg	RSS Racing	Ford
43	Ryan Ellis	Alpha Prime Racing	Chevrolet
44	Daniel Dye (i)	Alpha Prime Racing	Chevrolet
45	Jeffrey Earnhardt	Alpha Prime Racing	Chevrolet
48	Parker Kligerman	Big Machine Racing	Chevrolet
51	Jeremy Clements	Jeremy Clements Racing	Chevrolet
53	Chris Hacker (i)	Emerling-Gase Motorsports	Chevrolet
66	Timmy Hill (i)	MBM Motorsports	Ford
74	Brad Perez	CHK Racing	Chevrolet
78	Anthony Alfredo	B. J. McLeod Motorsports	Chevrolet
91	Kyle Weatherman	DGM Racing	Chevrolet
92	Josh Williams	DGM Racing	Chevrolet
98	Riley Herbst	Stewart–Haas Racing	Ford
Official entry list

== Practice ==
The first and only practice session was held on Friday, November 3, at 4:05 PM MST, and lasted for 50 minutes. John Hunter Nemechek, driving for Joe Gibbs Racing, set the fastest time in the session, with a lap of 27.679, and an average speed of 130.063 mph (209.316 km/h).

Pos.	#	Driver	Team	Make	Time	Speed
1	20	John Hunter Nemechek (CC)	Joe Gibbs Racing	Toyota	27.679	130.063
2	00	Cole Custer (CC)	Stewart–Haas Racing	Ford	27.817	129.417
3	98	Riley Herbst	Stewart–Haas Racing	Ford	27.913	128.972
Full practice results

== Qualifying ==
Qualifying was held on Saturday, November 4, at 12:30 PM MST. Since Phoenix Raceway is a mile oval, the qualifying system used was a single-car, one-lap system with only one round. In that round, whoever set the fastest time won the pole. Sammy Smith, driving for Joe Gibbs Racing, scored the pole for the race, with a lap of 27.153, and an average speed of 132.582 mph (213.370 km/h).

Pos.	#	Driver	Team	Make	Time	Speed
1	18	Sammy Smith (R)	Joe Gibbs Racing	Toyota	27.153	132.582
2	21	Austin Hill	Richard Childress Racing	Chevrolet	27.155	132.572
3	20	John Hunter Nemechek (CC)	Joe Gibbs Racing	Toyota	27.164	132.528
4	19	Myatt Snider	Joe Gibbs Racing	Toyota	27.165	132.523
5	2	Sheldon Creed	Richard Childress Racing	Chevrolet	27.202	132.343
6	16	Chandler Smith (R)	Kaulig Racing	Chevrolet	27.207	132.319
7	00	Cole Custer (CC)	Stewart–Haas Racing	Ford	27.262	132.052
8	7	Justin Allgaier (CC)	JR Motorsports	Chevrolet	27.274	131.994
9	98	Riley Herbst	Stewart–Haas Racing	Ford	27.306	131.839
10	24	Connor Mosack (R)	Sam Hunt Racing	Toyota	27.308	131.830
11	39	Ryan Sieg	RSS Racing	Ford	27.316	131.791
12	10	Daniel Hemric	Kaulig Racing	Chevrolet	27.328	131.733
13	17	Rajah Caruth (i)	Hendrick Motorsports	Chevrolet	27.339	131.680
14	31	Parker Retzlaff (R)	Jordan Anderson Racing	Chevrolet	27.399	131.392
15	8	Josh Berry	JR Motorsports	Chevrolet	27.402	131.377
16	1	Sam Mayer (CC)	JR Motorsports	Chevrolet	27.449	131.152
17	07	Dawson Cram	SS-Green Light Racing	Chevrolet	27.481	131.000
18	27	Jeb Burton	Jordan Anderson Racing	Chevrolet	27.509	130.866
19	25	Brett Moffitt	AM Racing	Ford	27.580	130.529
20	9	Brandon Jones	JR Motorsports	Chevrolet	27.583	130.515
21	91	Kyle Weatherman	DGM Racing	Chevrolet	27.609	130.392
22	38	Kyle Sieg	RSS Racing	Ford	27.611	130.383
23	11	Derek Kraus (i)	Kaulig Racing	Chevrolet	27.638	130.255
24	26	Kaz Grala	Sam Hunt Racing	Toyota	27.644	130.227
25	51	Jeremy Clements	Jeremy Clements Racing	Chevrolet	27.651	130.194
26	92	Josh Williams	DGM Racing	Chevrolet	27.763	129.669
27	43	Ryan Ellis	Alpha Prime Racing	Chevrolet	27.771	129.632
28	35	Joey Gase	Emerling-Gase Motorsports	Ford	27.775	129.613
29	6	Brennan Poole	JD Motorsports	Chevrolet	27.780	129.590
30	48	Parker Kligerman	Big Machine Racing	Chevrolet	27.787	129.557
31	53	Chris Hacker (i)	Emerling-Gase Motorsports	Chevrolet	27.787	129.557
32	02	Blaine Perkins (R)	Our Motorsports	Chevrolet	27.854	129.245
33	66	Timmy Hill (i)	MBM Motorsports	Ford	27.863	129.204
Qualified by owner's points
34	45	Jeffrey Earnhardt	Alpha Prime Racing	Chevrolet	27.870	129.171
35	08	J. J. Yeley	SS-Green Light Racing	Ford	28.157	127.855
36	4	Stefan Parsons (i)	JD Motorsports	Chevrolet	28.223	127.556
37	28	Joe Graf Jr.	RSS Racing	Ford	28.400	126.761
38	78	Anthony Alfredo	B. J. McLeod Motorsports	Chevrolet	–	–
Failed to qualify
39	44	Leland Honeyman	Alpha Prime Racing	Chevrolet	28.620	125.786
40	74	Brad Perez	CHK Racing	Chevrolet	–	–
Official qualifying results
Official starting lineup

== Race results ==
Stage 1 Laps: 45

Pos.	#	Driver	Team	Make	Pts
1	20	John Hunter Nemechek (CC)	Joe Gibbs Racing	Toyota	0
2	00	Cole Custer (CC)	Stewart-Haas Racing	Ford	0
3	16	Chandler Smith (R)	Kaulig Racing	Chevrolet	8
4	21	Austin Hill	Richard Childress Racing	Chevrolet	7
5	1	Sam Mayer (CC)	JR Motorsports	Chevrolet	0
6	18	Sammy Smith (R)	Joe Gibbs Racing	Toyota	5
7	7	Justin Allgaier (CC)	JR Motorsports	Chevrolet	0
8	9	Brandon Jones	JR Motorsports	Chevrolet	3
9	19	Myatt Snider	Joe Gibbs Racing	Toyota	2
10	25	Brett Moffitt	AM Racing	Ford	1

Stage 2 Laps: 45

Pos.	#	Driver	Team	Make	Pts
1	00	Cole Custer (CC)	Stewart-Haas Racing	Ford	0
2	1	Sam Mayer (CC)	JR Motorsports	Chevrolet	0
3	20	John Hunter Nemechek (CC)	Joe Gibbs Racing	Toyota	0
4	21	Austin Hill	Richard Childress Racing	Chevrolet	7
5	16	Chandler Smith (R)	Kaulig Racing	Chevrolet	6
6	9	Brandon Jones	JR Motorsports	Chevrolet	5
7	8	Josh Berry	JR Motorsports	Chevrolet	4
8	2	Sheldon Creed	Richard Childress Racing	Chevrolet	3
9	7	Justin Allgaier (CC)	JR Motorsports	Chevrolet	0
10	98	Riley Herbst	Stewart-Haas Racing	Ford	1

Stage 3 Laps: 110

Pos.	St	#	Driver	Team	Make	Laps	Led	Status	Pts
1	7	00	Cole Custer (CC)	Stewart–Haas Racing	Ford	202	96	Running	40
2	5	2	Sheldon Creed	Richard Childress Racing	Chevrolet	202	4	Running	38
3	8	7	Justin Allgaier (CC)	JR Motorsports	Chevrolet	202	0	Running	34
4	9	98	Riley Herbst	Stewart–Haas Racing	Ford	202	0	Running	34
5	16	1	Sam Mayer (CC)	JR Motorsports	Chevrolet	202	0	Running	32
6	15	8	Josh Berry	JR Motorsports	Chevrolet	202	0	Running	35
7	2	21	Austin Hill	Richard Childress Racing	Chevrolet	202	21	Running	44
8	6	16	Chandler Smith (R)	Kaulig Racing	Chevrolet	202	0	Running	43
9	1	18	Sammy Smith (R)	Joe Gibbs Racing	Toyota	202	11	Running	33
10	24	26	Kaz Grala	Sam Hunt Racing	Toyota	202	0	Running	27
11	20	9	Brandon Jones	JR Motorsports	Chevrolet	202	0	Running	34
12	18	27	Jeb Burton	Jordan Anderson Racing	Chevrolet	202	0	Running	25
13	14	31	Parker Retzlaff (R)	Jordan Anderson Racing	Chevrolet	202	0	Running	24
14	13	17	Rajah Caruth (i)	Hendrick Motorsports	Chevrolet	202	0	Running	0
15	19	25	Brett Moffitt	AM Racing	Ford	202	0	Running	23
16	30	48	Parker Kligerman	Big Machine Racing	Chevrolet	202	0	Running	21
17	21	91	Kyle Weatherman	DGM Racing	Chevrolet	202	0	Running	20
18	11	39	Ryan Sieg	RSS Racing	Ford	202	0	Running	19
19	17	07	Dawson Cram	SS-Green Light Racing	Chevrolet	202	0	Running	18
20	25	51	Jeremy Clements	Jeremy Clements Racing	Chevrolet	202	0	Running	17
21	12	10	Daniel Hemric	Kaulig Racing	Chevrolet	202	4	Running	16
22	4	19	Myatt Snider	Joe Gibbs Racing	Toyota	202	0	Running	17
23	34	45	Jeffrey Earnhardt	Alpha Prime Racing	Chevrolet	202	0	Running	14
24	38	78	Anthony Alfredo	B. J. McLeod Motorsports	Chevrolet	202	0	Running	13
25	26	92	Josh Williams	DGM Racing	Chevrolet	202	0	Running	12
26	27	43	Ryan Ellis	Alpha Prime Racing	Chevrolet	202	0	Running	11
27	28	35	Joey Gase	Emerling-Gase Motorsports	Ford	202	0	Running	10
28	3	20	John Hunter Nemechek (CC)	Joe Gibbs Racing	Toyota	202	66	Running	9
29	29	6	Brennan Poole	JD Motorsports	Chevrolet	202	0	Running	8
30	33	66	Timmy Hill (i)	MBM Motorsports	Ford	200	0	Running	0
31	37	28	Joe Graf Jr.	RSS Racing	Ford	200	0	Running	6
32	32	02	Blaine Perkins (R)	Our Motorsports	Chevrolet	200	0	Running	5
33	36	4	Stefan Parsons (i)	JD Motorsports	Chevrolet	194	0	Running	0
34	10	24	Connor Mosack (R)	Sam Hunt Racing	Toyota	180	0	Accident	3
35	31	53	Chris Hacker (i)	Emerling-Gase Motorsports	Chevrolet	178	0	Suspension	0
36	35	08	J. J. Yeley	SS-Green Light Racing	Ford	101	0	Accident	1
37	23	11	Derek Kraus (i)	Kaulig Racing	Chevrolet	84	0	Accident	0
38	22	38	Kyle Sieg	RSS Racing	Ford	14	0	Vibration	1
Official race results

== Standings after the race ==
Drivers' Championship standings

	Pos	Driver	Points
3	1	Cole Custer	4,040
	2	Justin Allgaier	4,034 (-6)
2	3	Sam Mayer	4,032 (–8)
1	4	John Hunter Nemechek	4,009 (–31)
	5	Austin Hill	2,273 (–1,767)
	6	Sammy Smith	2,248 (–1,792)
2	7	Sheldon Creed	2,225 (–1,815)
1	8	Daniel Hemric	2,224 (–1,816)
1	9	Chandler Smith	2,219 (–1,821)
2	10	Parker Kligerman	2,209 (–1,831)
	11	Josh Berry	2,172 (–1,868)
	12	Jeb Burton	2,126 (–1,914)
Official driver's standings

- Note: Only the first 12 positions are included for the driver standings.

Previous race: 2023 Dead On Tools 250	NASCAR Xfinity Series; 2023 season	Next race: 2024 United Rentals 300
