= 2023 Dead On Tools 250 =

32nd race of the 2023 NASCAR Xfinity Series

Race details
- Race 32 of 33 of the 2023 NASCAR Xfinity Series
- Date: October 28, 2023
- Official name: 4th Annual Dead On Tools 250
- Location: Martinsville Speedway, Ridgeway, Virginia
- Course: Permanent racing facility
- Course length: 0.526 miles (0.847 km)
- Distance: 256 laps, 134 mi (215 km)
- Scheduled distance: 250 laps, 131 mi (211 km)
- Average speed: 55.294 mph (88.987 km/h)

Pole position
Driver	Sammy Smith	Joe Gibbs Racing
- Time: 20.035

Most laps led
Driver	Sammy Smith	Joe Gibbs Racing
- Laps: 147

Winner
No. 7	Justin Allgaier	JR Motorsports

Television in the United States
- Network: USA
- Announcers: Rick Allen, Jeff Burton, Steve Letarte, and Dale Earnhardt Jr.

Radio in the United States
- Radio: MRN

The 2023 Dead On Tools 250 was the 32nd stock car race of the 2023 NASCAR Xfinity Series, the final race of the Round of 8, and the 4th iteration of the event. The race was held on Saturday, October 28, 2023, in Ridgeway, Virginia at Martinsville Speedway, a 0.526 miles (0.847 km) permanent paper-clip shaped racetrack. The race was originally scheduled to be contested over 250 laps, but was extended to 256 laps, due to a NASCAR overtime finish. In a wild race that resulted in 15 cautions, Justin Allgaier, driving for JR Motorsports, would survive the chaos on the final lap, and hold off Sheldon Creed in a close finish to earn his 23rd career NASCAR Xfinity Series win, and his fourth of the season. He would also earn a spot in the Championship 4. Sammy Smith would dominate the majority of the race, winning the second stage and leading a race-high 147 laps. After navigating through the field in the final stage, he would finish third. To fill out the podium, Creed, driving for Richard Childress Racing, and Smith, driving for Joe Gibbs Racing, would finish 2nd and 3rd, respectively.

The race was mostly known as an exciting battle for the final Championship 4 spot between Allgaier, Austin Hill, and Cole Custer. Coming into the race, the three drivers were only separated by four points. Both Custer and Hill were involved in the last lap wreck, but it would be Custer who would prevail by six points over Hill. Sam Mayer, Allgaier, John Hunter Nemechek, and Custer would advance into the Championship 4. Hill, Sammy Smith, Creed, and Chandler Smith would be eliminated from championship contention.

== Background ==
Martinsville Speedway is an International Speedway Corporation-owned NASCAR stock car racing track located in Henry County, in Ridgeway, Virginia, just to the south of Martinsville. At 0.526 miles (0.847 km) in length, it is the shortest track in the NASCAR Cup Series. The track is also one of the first paved oval tracks in NASCAR, being built in 1947 by H. Clay Earles. It is also the only race track that has been on the NASCAR circuit from its beginning in 1948. Along with this, Martinsville is the only NASCAR oval track on the entire NASCAR track circuit to have asphalt surfaces on the straightaways, then concrete to cover the turns.

=== Entry list ===
- (R) denotes rookie driver.
- (i) denotes driver who is ineligible for series driver points.
- (P) denotes playoff driver.
- (OP) denotes owner's playoffs car.

#	Driver	Team	Make
00	Cole Custer (P)	Stewart–Haas Racing	Ford
1	Sam Mayer (P)	JR Motorsports	Chevrolet
02	Blaine Perkins (R)	Our Motorsports	Chevrolet
2	Sheldon Creed (P)	Richard Childress Racing	Chevrolet
4	J. J. Yeley	JD Motorsports	Chevrolet
6	Brennan Poole	JD Motorsports	Chevrolet
07	Devin Jones	SS-Green Light Racing	Chevrolet
7	Justin Allgaier (P)	JR Motorsports	Chevrolet
08	Chad Finchum	SS-Green Light Racing	Ford
8	Josh Berry	JR Motorsports	Chevrolet
9	Brandon Jones	JR Motorsports	Chevrolet
10	Daniel Hemric (OP)	Kaulig Racing	Chevrolet
11	Layne Riggs	Kaulig Racing	Chevrolet
16	Chandler Smith (R) (P)	Kaulig Racing	Chevrolet
18	Sammy Smith (R) (P)	Joe Gibbs Racing	Toyota
19	Myatt Snider	Joe Gibbs Racing	Toyota
20	John Hunter Nemechek (P)	Joe Gibbs Racing	Toyota
21	Austin Hill (P)	Richard Childress Racing	Chevrolet
24	Connor Mosack (R)	Sam Hunt Racing	Toyota
25	Brett Moffitt	AM Racing	Ford
26	Kaz Grala	Sam Hunt Racing	Toyota
27	Jeb Burton	Jordan Anderson Racing	Chevrolet
28	C. J. McLaughlin	RSS Racing	Ford
29	Kyle Sieg	RSS Racing	Ford
31	Parker Retzlaff (R)	Jordan Anderson Racing	Chevrolet
35	Chris Hacker (i)	Emerling-Gase Motorsports	Chevrolet
38	Joe Graf Jr.	RSS Racing	Ford
39	Ryan Sieg	RSS Racing	Ford
43	Ryan Ellis	Alpha Prime Racing	Chevrolet
44	Rajah Caruth (i)	Alpha Prime Racing	Chevrolet
45	Jeffrey Earnhardt	Alpha Prime Racing	Chevrolet
48	Parker Kligerman	Big Machine Racing	Chevrolet
51	Jeremy Clements	Jeremy Clements Racing	Chevrolet
53	Akinori Ogata (i)	Emerling-Gase Motorsports	Chevrolet
66	Timmy Hill (i)	MBM Motorsports	Toyota
78	Anthony Alfredo	B. J. McLeod Motorsports	Chevrolet
91	Josh Bilicki	DGM Racing	Chevrolet
92	Josh Williams	DGM Racing	Chevrolet
98	Riley Herbst	Stewart–Haas Racing	Ford
Official entry list

== Practice ==
For practice, drivers will be separated into two groups, Group A and B. Both sessions will be 15 minutes long, and was held on Friday, October 27, at 5:00 PM EST. Blaine Perkins, driving for Our Motorsports, would set the fastest time between both sessions, with a lap of 20.480, and an average speed of 92.461 mph (148.802 km/h).

Pos.	#	Driver	Team	Make	Time	Speed
1	02	Blaine Perkins (R)	Our Motorsports	Chevrolet	20.480	92.461
2	20	John Hunter Nemechek (P)	Joe Gibbs Racing	Toyota	20.535	92.213
3	25	Brett Moffitt	AM Racing	Ford	20.584	91.994
Full practice results

== Qualifying ==
Qualifying was held on Friday, October 27, at 5:35 PM EST. Since Martinsville Speedway is a short track, the qualifying system used is a single-car, two-lap system with only one round. In that round, whoever sets the fastest time will win the pole. Sammy Smith, driving for Joe Gibbs Racing, would score the pole for the race, with a lap of 20.035, and an average speed of 94.515 mph (152.107 km/h).

Pos.	#	Driver	Team	Make	Time	Speed
1	18	Sammy Smith (R) (P)	Joe Gibbs Racing	Toyota	20.035	94.515
2	7	Justin Allgaier (P)	JR Motorsports	Chevrolet	20.047	94.458
3	00	Cole Custer (P)	Stewart–Haas Racing	Ford	20.051	94.439
4	98	Riley Herbst	Stewart–Haas Racing	Ford	20.098	94.218
5	20	John Hunter Nemechek (P)	Joe Gibbs Racing	Toyota	20.113	94.148
6	9	Brandon Jones	JR Motorsports	Chevrolet	20.119	94.120
7	16	Chandler Smith (R) (P)	Kaulig Racing	Chevrolet	20.121	94.111
8	2	Sheldon Creed (P)	Richard Childress Racing	Chevrolet	20.126	94.087
9	21	Austin Hill (P)	Richard Childress Racing	Chevrolet	20.139	94.027
10	31	Parker Retzlaff (R)	Jordan Anderson Racing	Chevrolet	20.152	93.966
11	19	Myatt Snider	Joe Gibbs Racing	Toyota	20.158	93.938
12	8	Josh Berry	JR Motorsports	Chevrolet	20.205	93.719
13	39	Ryan Sieg	RSS Racing	Ford	20.206	93.715
14	10	Daniel Hemric (OP)	Kaulig Racing	Chevrolet	20.208	93.705
15	48	Parker Kligerman	Big Machine Racing	Chevrolet	20.218	93.659
16	25	Brett Moffitt	AM Racing	Ford	20.222	93.641
17	1	Sam Mayer (P)	JR Motorsports	Chevrolet	20.284	93.354
18	91	Josh Bilicki	DGM Racing	Chevrolet	20.295	93.304
19	11	Layne Riggs	Kaulig Racing	Chevrolet	20.335	93.120
20	51	Jeremy Clements	Jeremy Clements Racing	Chevrolet	20.336	93.116
21	4	J. J. Yeley	JD Motorsports	Chevrolet	20.420	92.733
22	78	Anthony Alfredo	B. J. McLeod Motorsports	Chevrolet	20.431	92.683
23	26	Kaz Grala	Sam Hunt Racing	Toyota	20.441	92.637
24	92	Josh Williams	DGM Racing	Chevrolet	20.449	92.601
25	24	Connor Mosack (R)	Sam Hunt Racing	Toyota	20.492	92.407
26	44	Rajah Caruth (i)	Alpha Prime Racing	Chevrolet	20.493	92.402
27	6	Brennan Poole	JD Motorsports	Chevrolet	20.505	92.348
28	29	Kyle Sieg	RSS Racing	Ford	20.535	92.213
29	45	Jeffrey Earnhardt	Alpha Prime Racing	Chevrolet	20.547	92.159
30	08	Chad Finchum	SS-Green Light Racing	Ford	20.555	92.124
31	02	Blaine Perkins (R)	Our Motorsports	Chevrolet	20.590	91.967
32	43	Ryan Ellis	Alpha Prime Racing	Chevrolet	20.622	91.824
33	38	Joe Graf Jr.	RSS Racing	Ford	20.699	91.483
Qualified by owner's points
34	28	C. J. McLaughlin	RSS Racing	Ford	20.761	91.209
35	35	Chris Hacker (i)	Emerling-Gase Motorsports	Chevrolet	20.762	91.205
36	53	Akinori Ogata (i)	Emerling-Gase Motorsports	Chevrolet	21.063	89.902
37	07	Devin Jones	SS-Green Light Racing	Chevrolet	21.444	88.304
38	27	Jeb Burton	Jordan Anderson Racing	Chevrolet	–	–
Failed to qualify
39	66	Timmy Hill (i)	MBM Motorsports	Toyota	20.863	90.764
Official qualifying results
Official starting lineup

== Race results ==
Stage 1 Laps: 60

Pos.	#	Driver	Team	Make	Pts
1	7	Justin Allgaier (P)	JR Motorsports	Chevrolet	10
2	00	Cole Custer (P)	Stewart–Haas Racing	Ford	9
3	20	John Hunter Nemechek (P)	Joe Gibbs Racing	Toyota	8
4	21	Austin Hill (P)	Richard Childress Racing	Chevrolet	7
5	18	Sammy Smith (R) (P)	Joe Gibbs Racing	Toyota	6
6	78	Anthony Alfredo	B. J. McLeod Motorsports	Chevrolet	5
7	98	Riley Herbst	Stewart–Haas Racing	Ford	4
8	19	Myatt Snider	Joe Gibbs Racing	Toyota	3
9	16	Chandler Smith (R) (P)	Kaulig Racing	Chevrolet	2
10	91	Josh Bilicki	DGM Racing	Chevrolet	1

Stage 2 Laps: 60

Pos.	#	Driver	Team	Make	Pts
1	18	Sammy Smith (R) (P)	Joe Gibbs Racing	Toyota	10
2	8	Josh Berry	JR Motorsports	Chevrolet	9
3	19	Myatt Snider	Joe Gibbs Racing	Toyota	8
4	2	Sheldon Creed (P)	Richard Childress Racing	Chevrolet	7
5	26	Kaz Grala	Sam Hunt Racing	Toyota	6
6	31	Parker Retzlaff (R)	Jordan Anderson Racing	Chevrolet	5
7	16	Chandler Smith (R) (P)	Kaulig Racing	Chevrolet	4
8	00	Cole Custer (P)	Stewart–Haas Racing	Ford	3
9	9	Brandon Jones	JR Motorsports	Chevrolet	2
10	98	Riley Herbst	Stewart–Haas Racing	Ford	1

Stage 3 Laps: 136

Pos.	St	#	Driver	Team	Make	Laps	Led	Status	Pts
1	2	7	Justin Allgaier (P)	JR Motorsports	Chevrolet	256	21	Running	50
2	8	2	Sheldon Creed (P)	Richard Childress Racing	Chevrolet	256	1	Running	42
3	1	18	Sammy Smith (R) (P)	Joe Gibbs Racing	Toyota	256	147	Running	50
4	4	98	Riley Herbst	Stewart–Haas Racing	Ford	256	0	Running	38
5	12	8	Josh Berry	JR Motorsports	Chevrolet	256	0	Running	41
6	14	10	Daniel Hemric (OP)	Kaulig Racing	Chevrolet	256	0	Running	31
7	10	31	Parker Retzlaff (R)	Jordan Anderson Racing	Chevrolet	256	0	Running	35
8	22	78	Anthony Alfredo	B. J. McLeod Motorsports	Chevrolet	256	0	Running	34
9	38	27	Jeb Burton	Jordan Anderson Racing	Chevrolet	256	0	Running	28
10	15	48	Parker Kligerman	Big Machine Racing	Chevrolet	256	0	Running	27
11	19	11	Layne Riggs	Kaulig Racing	Chevrolet	256	9	Running	26
12	26	44	Rajah Caruth (i)	Alpha Prime Racing	Chevrolet	256	0	Running	0
13	34	28	C. J. McLaughlin	RSS Racing	Ford	256	0	Running	24
14	24	92	Josh Williams	DGM Racing	Chevrolet	256	0	Running	23
15	11	19	Myatt Snider	Joe Gibbs Racing	Toyota	256	1	Running	33
16	6	9	Brandon Jones	JR Motorsports	Chevrolet	256	0	Running	23
17	20	51	Jeremy Clements	Jeremy Clements Racing	Chevrolet	256	0	Running	20
18	5	20	John Hunter Nemechek (P)	Joe Gibbs Racing	Toyota	256	54	Running	27
19	3	00	Cole Custer (P)	Stewart–Haas Racing	Ford	256	1	Running	30
20	16	25	Brett Moffitt	AM Racing	Ford	256	0	Running	17
21	9	21	Austin Hill (P)	Richard Childress Racing	Chevrolet	255	22	Accident	23
22	31	02	Blaine Perkins (R)	Our Motorsports	Chevrolet	255	0	Accident	15
23	18	91	Josh Bilicki	DGM Racing	Chevrolet	255	0	Accident	15
24	32	43	Ryan Ellis	Alpha Prime Racing	Chevrolet	245	0	Transmission	13
25	17	1	Sam Mayer (P)	JR Motorsports	Chevrolet	244	0	Accident	12
26	29	45	Jeffrey Earnhardt	Alpha Prime Racing	Chevrolet	244	0	Accident	11
27	30	08	Chad Finchum	SS-Green Light Racing	Ford	244	0	Accident	10
28	23	26	Kaz Grala	Sam Hunt Racing	Toyota	243	0	Accident	15
29	33	38	Joe Graf Jr.	RSS Racing	Ford	240	0	Running	8
30	35	35	Chris Hacker (i)	Emerling-Gase Motorsports	Chevrolet	237	0	Radiator	0
31	25	24	Connor Mosack (R)	Sam Hunt Racing	Toyota	232	0	Radiator	6
32	27	6	Brennan Poole	JD Motorsports	Chevrolet	218	0	Engine	5
33	36	53	Akinori Ogata (i)	Emerling-Gase Motorsports	Chevrolet	217	0	Oil Line	0
34	21	4	J. J. Yeley	JD Motorsports	Chevrolet	207	0	Accident	3
35	13	39	Ryan Sieg	RSS Racing	Ford	203	0	Steering	2
36	7	16	Chandler Smith (R) (P)	Kaulig Racing	Chevrolet	187	0	Accident	7
37	37	07	Devin Jones	SS-Green Light Racing	Chevrolet	131	0	Engine	1
38	28	29	Kyle Sieg	RSS Racing	Ford	40	0	Accident	1
Official race results

== Standings after the race ==
Drivers' Championship standings

	Pos	Driver	Points
3	1	Sam Mayer	4,000
3	2	Justin Allgaier	4,000 (-0)
2	3	John Hunter Nemechek	4,000 (–0)
2	4	Cole Custer	4,000 (–0)
2	5	Austin Hill	2,229 (–1,771)
	6	Sammy Smith	2,215 (–1,785)
2	7	Daniel Hemric	2,208 (–1,792)
2	8	Parker Kligerman	2,188 (–1,812)
1	9	Sheldon Creed	2,187 (–1,813)
3	10	Chandler Smith	2,176 (–1,824)
	11	Josh Berry	2,137 (–1,863)
	12	Jeb Burton	2,101 (–1,899)
Official driver's standings

- Note: Only the first 12 positions are included for the driver standings.

Previous race: 2023 Contender Boats 300	NASCAR Xfinity Series; 2023 season	Next race: 2023 NASCAR Xfinity Series Championship Race
