= Jordan Anderson Racing =

American auto racing team

Jordan Anderson Racing Bommarito Autosport
- Owner(s): Jordan Anderson; John Bommarito
- Base: Statesville, North Carolina
- Series: NASCAR O'Reilly Auto Parts Series
- Race drivers: 27. TBA; 31. Brennan Poole; 32. Daniel Dye
- Manufacturer: Chevrolet
- Opened: 2018
- Website: jordanandersonracing.com

Career
- Debut: O'Reilly Auto Parts Series: 2021 Beef. It's What's for Dinner. 300 (Daytona); Camping World Truck Series: 2018 NextEra Energy Resources 250 (Daytona)
- Latest race: O'Reilly Auto Parts Series: 2026 O'Reilly Auto Parts 300 (Homestead); Camping World Truck Series: 2022 Chevrolet Silverado 250 (Talladega)
- Races competed: Total: 283; O'Reilly Auto Parts Series: 188; Camping World Truck Series: 95
- Drivers' Championships: Total: 0 O'Reilly Auto Parts Series: 0 Camping World Truck Series: 0
- Race victories: Total: 1 O'Reilly Auto Parts Series: 1 Camping World Truck Series: 0
- Pole positions: Total: 2 O'Reilly Auto Parts Series: 2 Camping World Truck Series: 0

Jordan Anderson Racing Bommarito Autosport is an American professional stock car racing team that competes in the NASCAR O'Reilly Auto Parts Series, fielding the No. 27 full-time for TBA, the No. 31 full-time for Brennan Poole, and the No. 32 full-time for Daniel Dye. The team is founded by Jordan Anderson.

== O'Reilly Auto Parts Series ==
=== Car No. 22 history ===
Jeb Burton (2023)

On August 21, 2023, the team announced that they would field the No. 22 with Jeb Burton running a special tribute paint scheme reminiscent of his father Ward Burton's win in the 2002 Daytona 500.

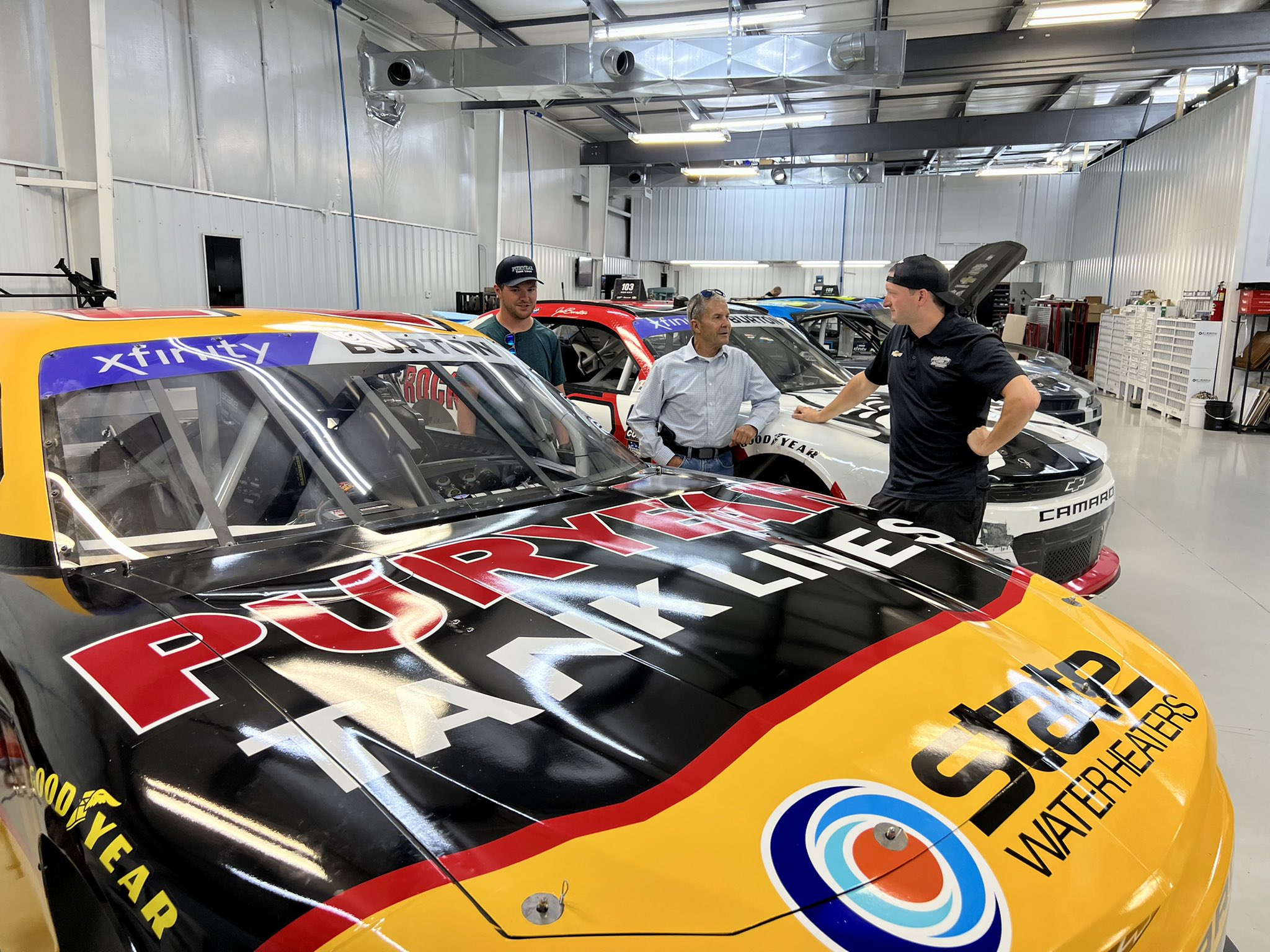
Jeb, Ward, and Jordan standing next to the 22 car

==== Car No. 22 results ====
Year	Driver	No.	Make	1	2	3	4	5	6	7	8	9	10	11	12	13	14	15	16	17	18	19	20	21	22	23	24	25	26	27	28	29	30	31	32	33	Owners	Pts
2023	Jeb Burton	22	Chevy	DAY	CAL	LVS	PHO	ATL	COA	RCH	MAR	TAL	DOV	DAR	CLT	PIR	SON	NSH	CSC	ATL	NHA	POC	ROA	MCH	IRC	GLN	DAY; 12	DAR	KAN	BRI	TEX	ROV	LVS	HOM	MAR	PHO	46th	25

=== Car No. 27 history ===
Jeb Burton (2023–2026)

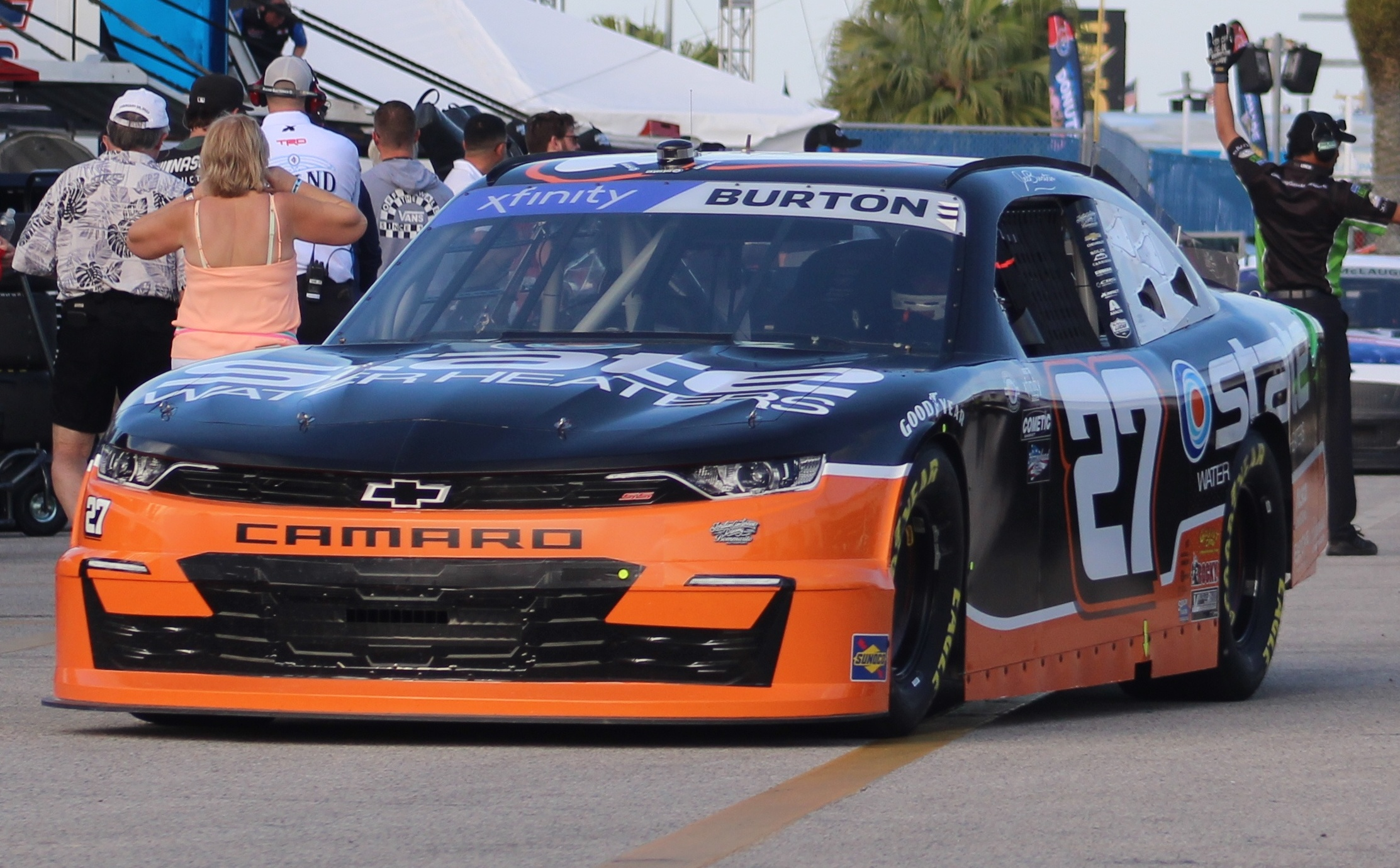
Jeb Burton in the No. 27 at Daytona International Speedway in 2023

On January 4, 2023, the team fielded the No. 27 with Jeb Burton joining from Our Motorsports. Burton started the 2023 season with an eleventh place finish at Daytona. At Talladega, he scored his second career win and Jordan Anderson Racing's first victory. Burton was eliminated at the conclusion of the Charlotte Roval race.

On November 2, 2023, it was announced that Burton would return to the team for the 2024 season. Burton finished nineteenth in points after earning only three top-ten finishes with a best finish of seventh at Talladega in October.

On December 6, 2024, it was announced that Burton would return for a third season with the team in 2025. Burton finished fourteenth in points after earning eight top-tens and one top five with a best finish of 2nd at Talladega in April.

Burton started the 2026 season with a 25th place DNF finish at Daytona. He would leave the team at the end of the season.

==== Car No. 27 results ====
Year	Driver	No.	Make	1	2	3	4	5	6	7	8	9	10	11	12	13	14	15	16	17	18	19	20	21	22	23	24	25	26	27	28	29	30	31	32	33	Owners	Pts
2023	Jeb Burton	27	Chevy	DAY; 11	CAL; 22	LVS; 14	PHO; 22	ATL; 16	COA; 21	RCH; 12	MAR; 14	TAL; 1	DOV; 18	DAR; 12	CLT; 7	PIR; 25	SON; 26	NSS; 13	CSC; 19	ATL; 13	NHA; 7	POC; 12	ROA; 12	MCH; 10	IRC; 16	GLN; 10		DAR; 18	KAN; 12	BRI; 13	TEX; 31	ROV; 34	LVS; 22	HOM; 20	MAR; 9	PHO; 12	12th	2126
2023	Jordan Anderson	27	Chevy																								DAY; 15										12th	2126
2024	Jeb Burton	27	Chevy	DAY; 26	ATL; 23	LVS; 23	PHO; 36	COA; 30	RCH; 26	MAR; 32	TEX; 32	TAL; 9	DOV; 11	DAR; 16	CLT; 17	PIR; 37	SON; 36	IOW; 24	NHA; 17	NSS; 19	CSC; 15	POC; 21	IND; 19	MCH; 16	DAY; 17	DAR; 17	ATL; 24	GLN; 31	BRI; 25	KAN; 23	TAL; 7	ROV; 15	LVS; 24	HOM; 20	MAR; 9	PHO; 16	22nd	512
2025	Jeb Burton	27	Chevy	DAY; 16	ATL; 6	COA; 25	PHO; 15	LVS; 23	HOM; 15	MAR; 11	DAR; 15	BRI; 21	ROC; 8	TAL; 2	TEX; 10	CLT; 20	NSS; 15	MXC; 8	POC; 11	ATL; 16	CSC; 27	SON; 20	DOV; 20	IND; 15	IOW; 29	GLN; 16	DAY; 20	PIR; 7	GTW; 36	BRI; 18	KAN; 30	ROV; 6	LVS; 26	TAL; 17	MAR; 6	PHO; 38	15th	719
2026	Jeb Burton	27	Chevy	DAY; 25	ATL; 16	COA; 18	PHO; 7	LVS; 27	DAR; 26	MAR; 30	ROC; 17	BRI; 16	KAN; 13	TAL; 25	TEX; 26	GLN; 22	DOV; 37	CLT; 22	NSS; 23	POC; 28	COR; 17	SON; 21	CHI; 20	ATL; 38	IND; 15	IOW; 27	DAY; 9	DAR; 33	GTW; 10	BRI; 25	LVS; 21	CLT; 22	PHO; 16	TAL; 11	MAR; 13	HOM; 22	23rd	547

=== Car No. 31 history ===
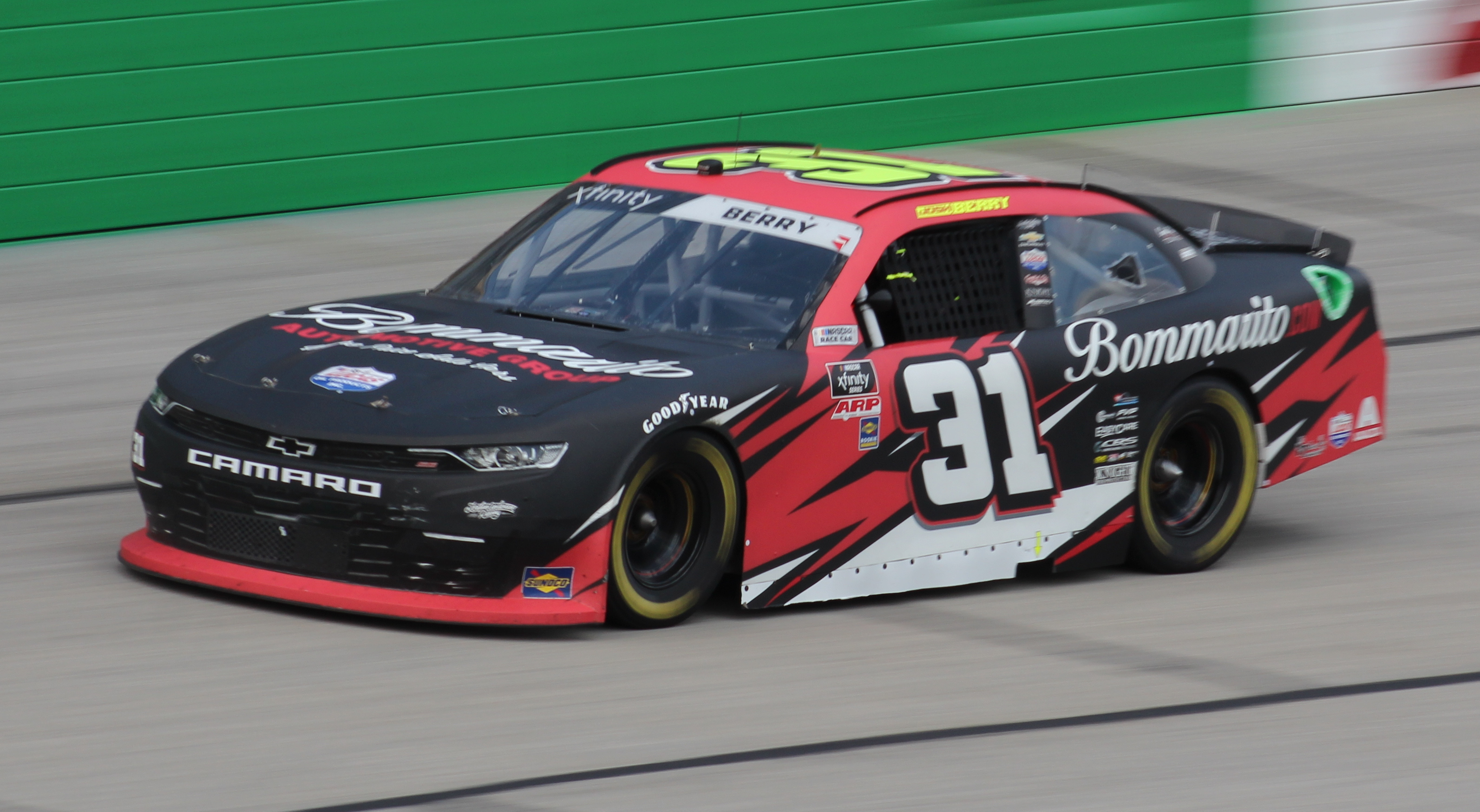
Josh Berry in the No. 31 at Atlanta Motor Speedway in 2021

Multiple Drivers (2021)

On January 25, 2021, it was announced that Jordan Anderson Racing would move up to the Xfinity Series full-time in the No. 31 car, with Anderson himself driving full-time and running for rookie of the year.

The team attempted to make their debut at the Beef. It's What's for Dinner. 300 at Daytona International Speedway in February 2021. Rain forced the cancelation of qualifying and due to NASCAR rainout rules, the car did not make the field due to not having any owner points and there being more than forty cars in the field. With qualifying not being held again (due to the COVID-19 pandemic) until the race at Circuit of the Americas in May and more than 36 cars entering the races, the No. 31 was excluded from the field for the following nine races.

The team was finally able to qualify for a race when Tyler Reddick joined the team at Circuit of the Americas in which he was able to finish eighth and followed that up with a fifth place finish at the Alsco Uniforms 300 the following week. Owner, Anderson, made his debut at the Alsco Uniforms 250 at Texas Motor Speedway, where he finished 34th.The team participated in every race in 2021 since they were able to qualify, finishing in the top-ten six times with multiple drivers.

Myatt Snider (2022)

On November 3, 2021, it was confirmed that Myatt Snider would move from the No. 2 Richard Childress Racing car to the No. 31 in a full-time role in the 2022 NASCAR Xfinity Series. The cars would continue to be built by RCR and the engines supplied by ECR Engines. TaxSlayer was announced as the sponsor. During the 2022 season, Snider finished second at Portland. At Martinsville, Snider collided with Austin Hill during the closing laps. Following the race, Hill punched Snider in the face on pit road.

Parker Retzlaff (2023–2024)

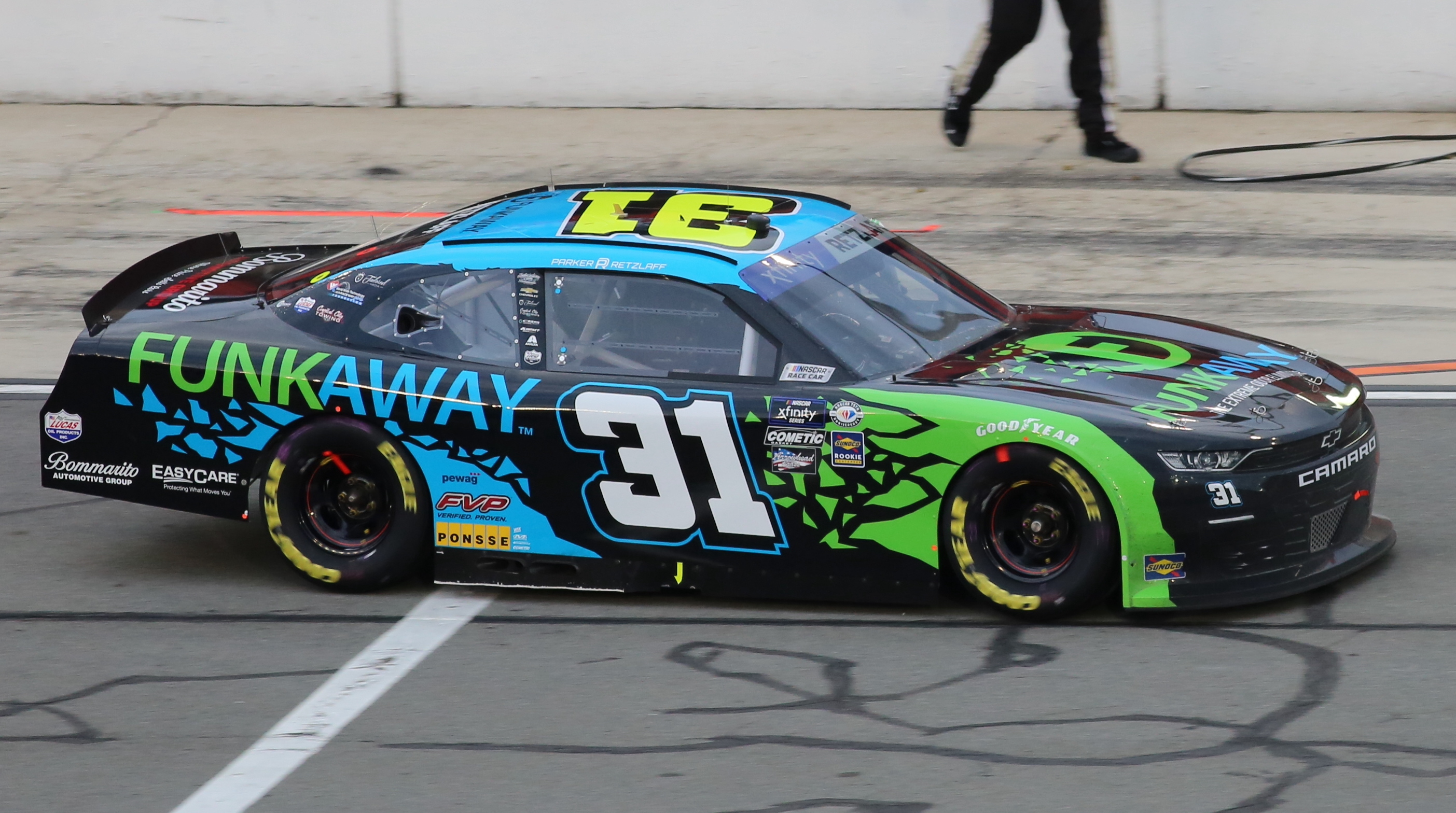
Parker Retzlaff in the No. 31 at Auto Club Speedway in 2023

It was announced that Parker Retzlaff will drive the No. 31 full time for the 2023 season. In the season-opener race at Daytona, Retzlaff earned a career-best 4th place finish.

On November 2, 2023, it was announced that Retzlaff would return to the team for the 2024 season.

On March 30, 2024, Retzlaff scored his and the team's first career pole position for the ToyotaCare 250 at Richmond Raceway and would score his second pole on November 1, 2024 for the National Debt Relief 250 at Martinsville Speedway.

On November 14, 2024, Retzlaff announced that he would not return for the 2025 season.

Blaine Perkins (2025–2026)

Blaine Perkins in the No. 31 car at Las Vegas in 2026

On December 6, 2024, it was announced that Blaine Perkins would replace the departing Retzlaff for 2025. He earned four top-ten finishes during the season, his highest coming at Talladega Superspeedway in October, where he finished in sixth-place.

On November 20, 2025, it was announced that Perkins will return to drive the No. 31 for the 2026 season. On October 13, 2026, it was announced that Perkins would leave the team following the 2026 season.

Brennan Poole (2027–)

On October 16, 2026, it was announced that Brennan Poole would drive the No. 31 full-time for JAR in 2027.

==== Car No. 31 results ====
Year	Driver	No.	Make	1	2	3	4	5	6	7	8	9	10	11	12	13	14	15	16	17	18	19	20	21	22	23	24	25	26	27	28	29	30	31	32	33	Owners	Pts
2021	Jordan Anderson	31	Chevy	DAY; DNQ	DRC; DNQ	HOM; DNQ	LVS; DNQ	PHO; DNQ	ATL; DNQ	MAR; DNQ	TAL; DNQ	DAR; DNQ	DOV; DNQ				TEX; 34					NHA; 34			MCH; 15	DAY; 18					TAL; 5			KAN; 20			25th	442
2021	Tyler Reddick	31	Chevy											COA; 8	CLT; 5			NSH; 15																			25th	442
2021	Josh Berry	31	Chevy													MOH; 8			POC; 9		ATL; 23							RCH; 22							MAR; 28		25th	442
2021	Kaz Grala	31	Chevy																	ROA; 18													TEX; 15				25th	442
2021	Erik Jones	31	Chevy																				GLN; 36														25th	442
2021	Sage Karam	31	Chevy																					IND; 26					BRI; 18			ROV; 25				PHO; 25	25th	442
2021	Austin Dillon	31	Chevy																								DAR; 29										25th	442
2021	Ty Dillon	31	Chevy																											LVS; 8							25th	442
2022	Myatt Snider	31	Chevy	DAY; 22	CAL; 26	LVS; 21	PHO; 24	ATL; 30	COA; 6	RCH; 30	MAR; 24	TAL; 9	DOV; 22	DAR; 37	TEX; 22	CLT; 10	PIR; 2	NSH; 27	ROA; 33	ATL; 18	NHA; 34	POC; 14	IND; 33	MCH; 17	GLN; 33	DAY; 12	DAR; 28	KAN; 19	BRI; 22	TEX; 20	TAL; 35	ROV; 13	LVS; 19	HOM; 22	MAR; 14	PHO; 25	23rd	527
2023	Parker Retzlaff	31	Chevy	DAY; 4	CAL; 20	LVS; 37	PHO; 18	ATL; 27	COA; 17	RCH; 16	MAR; 11	TAL; 7	DOV; 17	DAR; 24	CLT; 6	PIR; 17	SON; 38	NSH; 10	CSC; 28	ATL; 16	NHA; 31	POC; 35	ROA; 14	MCH; 9	IRC; 17	GLN; 26	DAY; 7	DAR; 13	KAN; 11	BRI; 15	TEX; 30	ROV; 22	LVS; 14	HOM; 12	MAR; 7	PHO; 13	18th	662
2024	Parker Retzlaff	31	Chevy	DAY; 3	ATL; 5	LVS; 35	PHO; 35	COA; 11	RCH; 16	MAR; 37	TEX; 22	TAL; 30	DOV; 10	DAR; 31	CLT; 14	PIR; 9	SON; 11	IOW; 32	NHA; 26	NSH; 17	CSC; 34	POC; 33	IND; 35	MCH; 20	DAY; 34	DAR; 36	ATL; 12	GLN; 14	BRI; 37	KAN; 21	TAL; 30	ROV; 12	LVS; 22	HOM; 23	MAR; 36	PHO; 34	21st	468
2025	Blaine Perkins	31	Chevy	DAY; 34	ATL; 19	COA; 10	PHO; 24	LVS; 26	HOM; 25	MAR; 19	DAR; 28	BRI; 30	CAR; 32	TAL; 7	TEX; 24	CLT; 24	NSH; 30	MXC; 27	POC; 29	ATL; 22	CSC; 18	SON; 19	DOV; 32	IND; 14	IOW; 28	GLN; 23	DAY; 14	PIR; 9	GTW; 23	BRI; 34	KAN; 36	ROV; 29	LVS; 27	TAL; 6	MAR; 20	PHO; 25	28th	456
2026	Blaine Perkins	31	Chevy	DAY; 8	ATL; 36	COA; 17	PHO; 28	LVS; 22	DAR; 30	MAR; 17	CAR; 23	BRI; 22	KAN; 23	TAL; 12	TEX; 25	GLN; 21	DOV; 34	CLT; 24	NSH; 20	POC; 20	COR; 13	SON; 30	CHI; 32	ATL; 20	IND; 28	IOW; 20	DAY; 15	DAR; 22	GTW; 20	BRI; 34	LVS; 31	CLT; 19	PHO; 22	TAL; 7	MAR; 33	HOM; 28	25th	472

=== Car No. 32 history ===
Part Time (2022, 2024–2025)

On August 1, 2022, when NASCAR released the entry list for the New Holland 250 at Michigan International Speedway, the No. 32 was included on the list with co-owner Jordan Anderson as the driver. Anderson failed to qualify due to a spin on his qualifying lap. Austin Wayne Self was tapped to drive the entry at Watkins Glen International a week later, failing to qualify for the race.

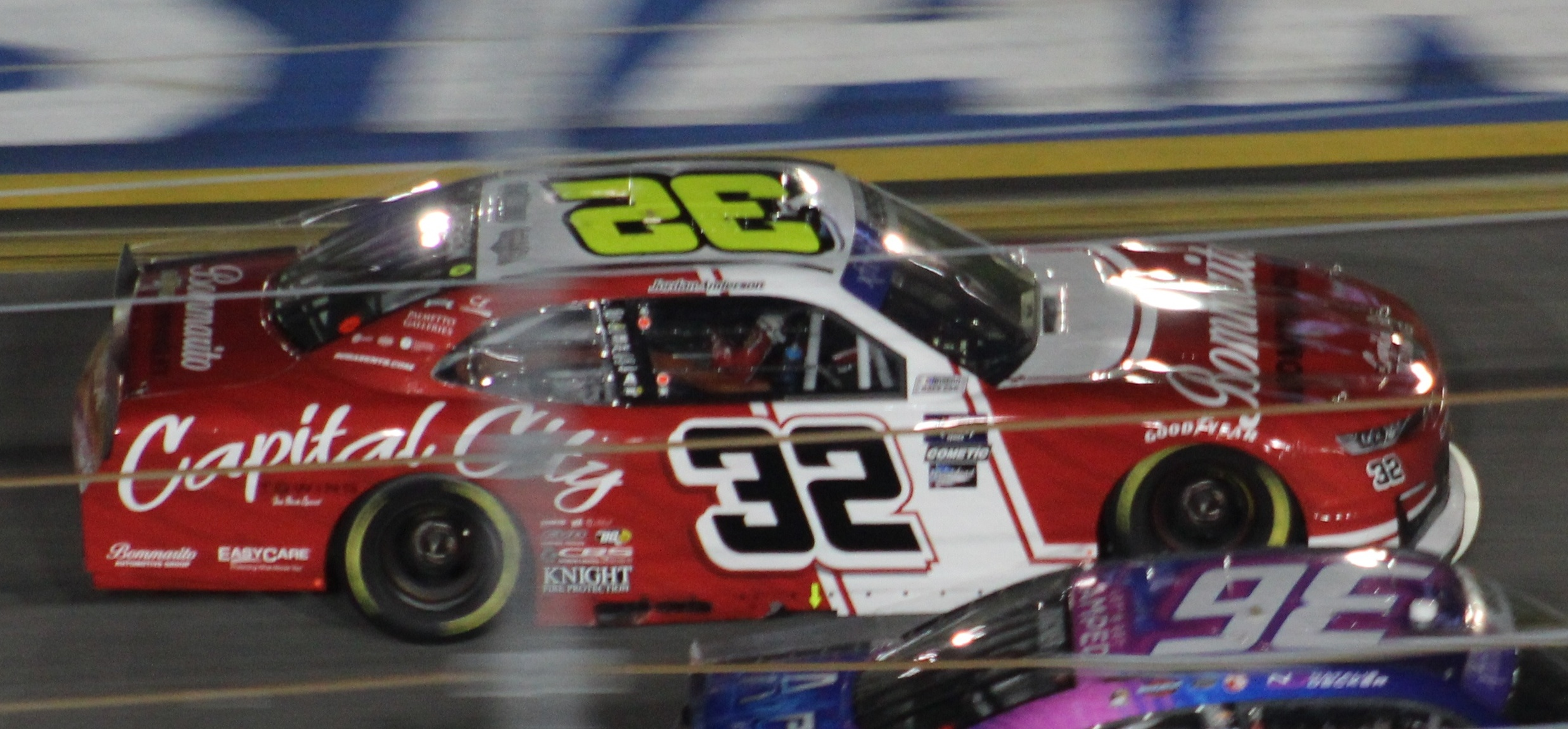
Anderson at Daytona in 2024

In 2024, the No. 32 part-time entry was co-fielded by Peterson Racing Group who competes regularly in the Trans-Am Series. Anderson would run the superspeedway races, and Austin Green would race road courses. Sage Karam, and Ryan Vargas would race various oval courses. Green would score three top-ten finishes at the 2024 Focused Health 250 (COTA) and Zip Buy Now, Pay Later 250.

The team would debut the 2025 season with owner Jordan Anderson behind the wheel for the second year in a row, followed by multiple appearances by Austin Green for the second year in a row. On April 10, 2025, British driver Katherine Legge announced that she would be in the car for multiple races, confirming a week later it would be a total of seven races. Rajah Caruth would drive the No. 32 at Dover and Daytona. Andrew Patterson would make his NASCAR Xfinity Series debut at Charlotte Roval in the No. 32 car. He failed to qualify for the race.

Multiple drivers (2026)

Andrew Patterson in the No. 32 car at Las Vegas in 2026

In 2026, the No. 32 would run full-time with multiple drivers behind the wheel. Caruth would compete in ten NASCAR O'Reilly Auto Parts Series races in the No. 32 to fill out his 2026 full time schedule. Ross Chastain would drive the No. 32 for four races. Paterson would return to drive the No. 32 for eight races. Tyler Ankrum would make his NASCAR O'Reilly Auto Parts Series debut in the No. 32 at Talladega. Richard Childress Racing development driver Carson Brown would make his O'Reilly Series debut at Iowa and would score a top-five at Charlotte. Daniel Dye would drive the No. 32 for four races.

Daniel Dye (2027)

On August 28, 2026, it was announced that Daniel Dye will drive the No. 32 full-time for the 2027 season.

==== Car No. 32 results ====
Year	Driver	No.	Make	1	2	3	4	5	6	7	8	9	10	11	12	13	14	15	16	17	18	19	20	21	22	23	24	25	26	27	28	29	30	31	32	33	Owners	Pts
2022	Jordan Anderson	32	Chevy	DAY	CAL	LVS	PHO	ATL	COA	RCH	MAR	TAL	DOV	DAR	TEX	CLT	PIR	NSS	ROA	ATL	NHA	POC	IND	MCH; DNQ													54th	0
2022	Austin Wayne Self	32	Chevy																						GLN; DNQ	DAY	DAR	KAN	BRI	TEX	TAL	ROV; DNQ	LVS	HOM	MAR	PHO	54th	0
2024	Jordan Anderson	32	Chevy	DAY; 4	ATL; 38							TAL; 31	DOV	DAR	CLT										DAY; 6	DAR	ATL				TAL; 33						38th	224
2024	Sage Karam	32	Chevy			LVS; 36																															38th	224
2024	Ryan Vargas	32	Chevy				PHO; 37		RCH; 38	MAR	TEX																										38th	224
2024	Austin Green	32	Chevy					COA; 7								PIR; 15	SON; 4	IOW	NHA	NSS	CSC; 10	POC	IND	MCH				GLN; 11	BRI; 38	KAN		ROV; 30	LVS	HOM	MAR	PHO	38th	224
2025	Jordan Anderson	32	Chevy	DAY; 7	ATL																								GTW; 38					TAL; 32			38th	264
2025	Austin Green	32	Chevy			COA; 26	PHO	LVS; 36	HOM	MAR	DAR; DNQ	BRI						MXC; 7	POC		CSC; 9	SON; 11				GLN; 7		PIR; 8		BRI; 31	KAN; 29		LVS; 31		MAR; 24	PHO	38th	264
2025	Katherine Legge	32	Chevy										ROC; DNQ	TAL; 34	TEX; 32	CLT; 34	NSS; DNQ			ATL; 34				IND; 37	IOW												38th	264
2025	Rajah Caruth	32	Chevy																				DOV; 22				DAY; 29										38th	264
2025	Andrew Patterson	32	Chevy																													ROV; DNQ					38th	264
2026	Jordan Anderson	32	Chevy	DAY; 4																				ATL; 27					GTW; 23								22nd	566
2026	Ross Chastain	32	Chevy		ATL; 6	COA; 9										GLN; 4						SON; 37															22nd	566
2026	Rajah Caruth	32	Chevy				PHO; 8	LVS; 19	DAR; 23			BRI; 14	KAN; 21		TEX; 34				NSS; 19	POC; 7			CHI; 24		IND; 22												22nd	566
2026	Andrew Patterson	32	Chevy							MAR; 31	ROC; 21						DOV; 19	CLT; 28			COR; 14									BRI; 19	LVS; 22		PHO; 14			HOM; 31	22nd	566
2026	Tyler Ankrum	32	Chevy											TAL; 32																							22nd	566
2026	Carson Brown	32	Chevy																							IOW; 15						CLT; 5					22nd	566
2026	Daniel Dye	32	Chevy																								DAY; 38	DAR; 27						TAL; 33	MAR; 34		22nd	566

=== Car No. 87 history ===
On August 30, 2024, it was announced that Raphael Matos would attempt to make his NASCAR Xfinity Series debut at Watkins Glen International, driving the No. 87 Chevrolet in collaboration with Peterson Racing Group, but several days later, it was revealed that Matos would not make his debut due to being unable to come to a mutual agreement with the team. He would be replaced by Mike Skeen.

The No. 87 made a return in 2025 with Austin Green, who had previously made appearances in the No. 32. He was moved to the No. 87 when Katherine Legge began running for the team.

==== Car No. 87 results ====
Year	Driver	No.	Make	1	2	3	4	5	6	7	8	9	10	11	12	13	14	15	16	17	18	19	20	21	22	23	24	25	26	27	28	29	30	31	32	33	Owners	Pts
2024	Mike Skeen	87	Chevy	DAY	ATL	LVS	PHO	COA	RCH	MAR	TEX	TAL	DOV	DAR	CLT	PIR	SON	IOW	NHA	NSH	CSC	POC	IND	MCH	DAY	DAR	ATL	GLN; 30	BRI	KAN	TAL	ROV	LVS	HOM	MAR	PHO	50th	7
2025	Austin Green	87	Chevy	DAY	ATL	COA	PHO	LVS	HOM	MAR	DAR	BRI	ROC; 30	TAL; DNQ	TEX	CLT	NSS	MXC	POC	ATL	CSC	SON	DOV	IND	IOW	GLN	DAY	PIR	GTW	BRI	KAN	ROV; 2	LVS	TAL	MAR	PHO	45th	22

== Camping World Truck Series ==
=== Truck No. 3 history ===
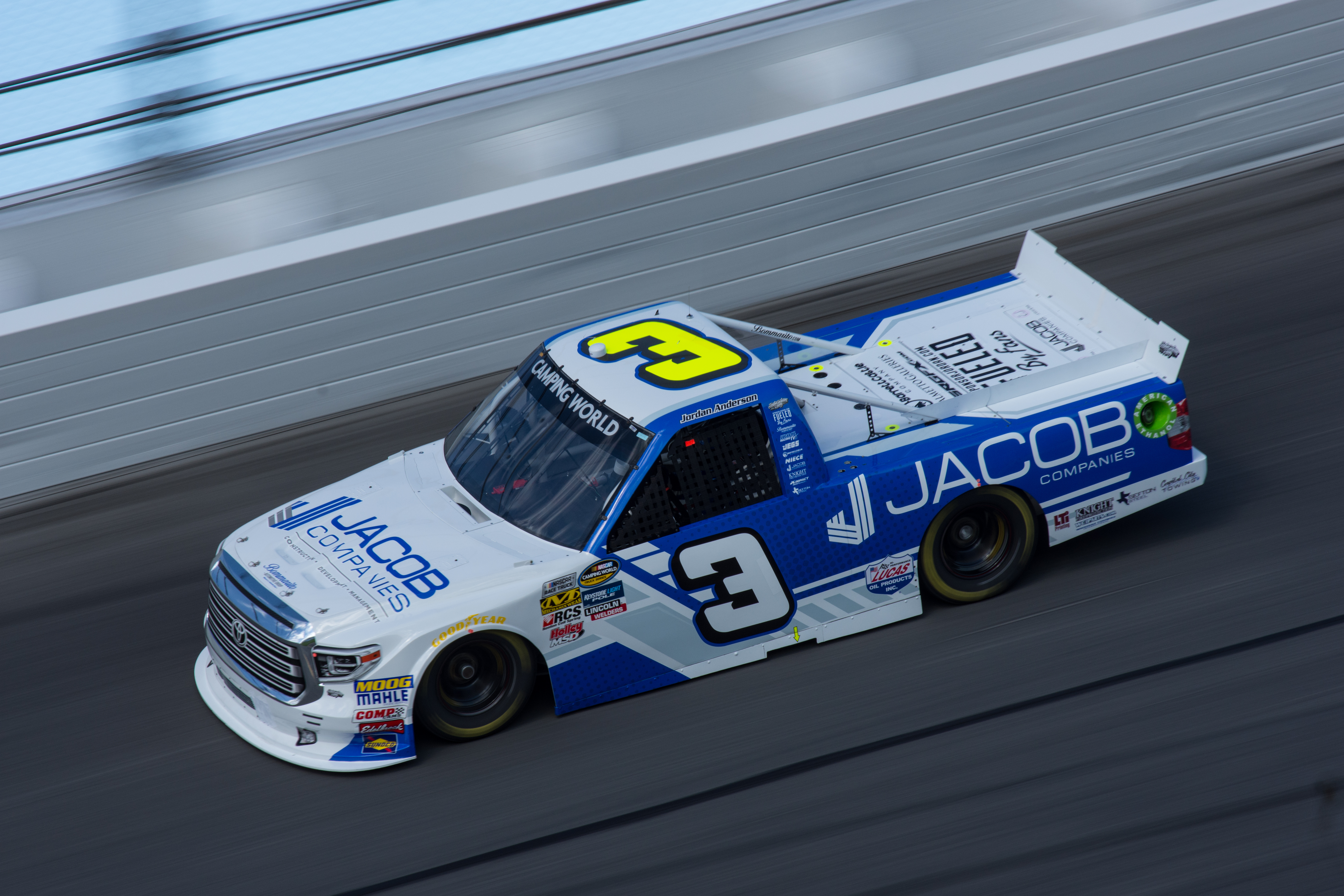
Jordan Anderson at Daytona International Speedway in 2018

On January 31, 2018, Jordan Anderson announced that he will be fielding his team in the NASCAR Camping World Truck Series full-time in 2018. He chose the number 3 in honor of Junior Johnson, Dale Earnhardt, and Austin Dillon. The team purchased the Brad Keselowski Racing's No. 29 owners points for them to secure every race in 2018. In the team's first race, at Daytona, Anderson drove the truck to a 9th-place finish, spinning on the last lap but avoiding hitting the wall and damaging his truck. On July 10, 2018, it was announced Ryan Newman would drive the No. 3 at Eldora. Newman would be placed in Heat #5 and finished second, being placed tenth on the grid. During the race, Newman would, unfortunately, be damaged in a wreck involving Tyler Dippel and Matt Crafton. He would get back on track but finish 30th. The team would go on top compile two Top 10 finishes in their inaugural season and finish fifteenth in the final 2018 driver point standings.

In 2019, Anderson drove the No. 3 for all but one race, with the lone exception being the Eldora Dirt Derby with Carson Hocevar.

In 2020, Anderson finished second in a thrilling finish with Grant Enfinger in the NextEra Energy 250. Also in that season, Anderson finished 6th at Talladega Superspeedway. Other than that, he had 6 other top 20 finishes.

In 2021, Anderson went part-time in the No. 3 to focus on his Xfinity Series program. He once again finished second at Daytona in a photo finish, this time with Ben Rhodes. Bobby Reuse raced at the Daytona Road Course, finishing 27th. Dirt ringer J. R. Heffner joined the team for the Bristol Motor Speedway dirt race, but would withdraw following a crash in practice. Howie DiSavino III and Keith McGee would run races for the team as well. Sprint Car racer Parker Price-Miller joined the team at Knoxville for the Corn Belt 150. Sage Karam, who debuted for the team at the Pennzoil 150, would make his debut at the United Rentals 200.

Following the 2022 Fr8 208, the team pulled out of the following race at Circuit of the Americas and announced a temporary pause in the truck program for at least the next three races. This marked the first time that the team didn't run full-time.

==== Truck No. 3 results ====
Year	Team	No.	Make	1	2	3	4	5	6	7	8	9	10	11	12	13	14	15	16	17	18	19	20	21	22	23	NCWTC	Pts
2018	Jordan Anderson	3	Toyota	DAY; 9																		TAL; 7					20th	398
2018	Jordan Anderson	3	Chevy		ATL; 24	LVS; 17	MAR; 22	DOV; 18	KAN; 25	CLT; 20	TEX; 19	IOW; 23	GTW; 23	CHI; 17	KEN; 19		POC; 16	MCH; 13	BRI; 22	MSP; 16	LVS; 20		MAR; 26	TEX; 29	PHO; 23	HOM; 20	20th	398
2018	Ryan Newman	3	Chevy													ELD; 30											20th	398
2019	Jordan Anderson	3	Chevy	DAY; 25	ATL; 19	LVS; 21	MAR; 26	TEX; 21	DOV; 21	KAN; 13	CLT; 15	TEX; 15	IOW; 18	GTW; 18	CHI; 20	KEN; 30	POC; 13		MCH; 14	BRI; 28	MSP; 16	LVS; 14	TAL; 21	MAR; 12	PHO; 28	HOM; 21	18th	412
2019	Carson Hocevar	3	Chevy															ELD; 25									18th	412
2020	Jordan Anderson	3	Chevy	DAY; 2	LVS; 20	CLT; 31	ATL; 37	HOM; 31	POC; 17	KEN; 24	TEX; 28	KAN; 30	KAN; 15	MCH; 32	DRC; 35	DOV; 24	GTW; 17	DAR; 24	RCH; 24	BRI; 23	LVS; 32	TAL; 6	KAN; 30	TEX; 13	MAR; 19	PHO; 22	18th	323
2021	Jordan Anderson	3	Chevy	DAY; 2		LVS; 27	ATL; 25			KAN; 30	DAR; 10								GTW; 37	DAR; 26			TAL; 11		PHO; 23		34th	237
2021	Bobby Reuse	3	Chevy		DAY; 27							COA; 34						GLN; 29									34th	237
2021	J. R. Heffner	3	Chevy					BRI; Wth																			34th	237
2021	Howie DiSavino III	3	Chevy						RCH; 34					TEX; 23		POC; 22					BRI; 28	LVS; 26					34th	237
2021	Keith McGee	3	Chevy										CLT; 29		NSS; DNQ												34th	237
2021	Parker Price-Miller	3	Chevy														KNX; 29										34th	237
2021	Sage Karam	3	Chevy																					MAR; 32			34th	237
2022	Jordan Anderson	3	Chevy	DAY; DNQ	LVS; 26	ATL; 18	COA; Wth	MAR	BRD	DAR	KAN	TEX; 14	CLT	GTW; 14	SON									TAL; 36	HOM	PHO	40th	95
2022	Dylan Westbrook	3	Chevy													KNO; 17	NSH	MOH	POC	IRP	RCH	KAN	BRI				40th	95

=== Partnerships ===
==== Roper Racing No. 04 ====
Jordan Anderson Racing used the owner points of the Roper Racing No. 04 at Mosport in 2019 for Roger Reuse in a one-off deal which also included his brother Bobby driving the No. 56 Hill truck.

==== Premium Motorsports No. 15 ====
For the Iowa race in 2018, Jordan Anderson Racing fielded a second truck using the owner points from the Premium Motorsports No. 15 truck for Bobby Reuse. Reuse started 32nd and finished 25th after having suspension issues. Reuse was supposed to drive at Gateway but Bryant Barnhill drove the truck instead. Bryant made his debut at Gateway starting 28th and finished 31st after his engine blew up on lap five. They used No. 15 owner's points to make both races.

==== Niece Motorsports No. 38 ====
For the Eldora race in 2019, Anderson partnered with Niece Motorsports to jointly field Niece's No. 38 truck, which was driven by dirt racer Mark Smith, who made his NASCAR debut in this race.

==== CMI Motorsports No. 49 ====
In 2020 and 2021, Anderson partnered with CMI Motorsports to jointly field CMI's No. 49 truck for Roger Reuse to drive at the Daytona Road Course. However, in 2021, qualifying was not held for the race, and due to there being over forty trucks on the entry list and the No. 49 being too low in owner points, the entry was excluded from the field. Anderson would use the team's owner points again at Gateway in 2020 with Roger making his first NASCAR start on an oval.

==== Hill Motorsports No. 56 ====
Jordan Anderson Racing used the owner points of the Hill Motorsports No. 56 at Mosport in 2019 for Bobby Reuse in a one-off deal which also included his brother Roger driving the No. 04 Roper truck. Anderson would use the team's owner points again at Phoenix, fielding the No. 56 for Carson Hocevar.

==== JJL Motorsports No. 97 ====
Jordan Anderson Racing used JJL Motorsports' No. 97 owner points for Roger Reuse to drive at Mosport in 2018.
