= 2023 Alsco Uniforms 250 =

17th race of the 2023 NASCAR Xfinity Series

Race details
- Race 17 of 33 of the 2023 NASCAR Xfinity Series
- Date: July 8, 2023
- Official name: 3rd Annual Alsco Uniforms 250
- Location: Atlanta Motor Speedway, Hampton, Georgia
- Course: Permanent racing facility
- Course length: 1.54 miles (2.48 km)
- Distance: 169 laps, 260 mi (418 km)
- Scheduled distance: 163 laps, 251 mi (404 km)
- Average speed: 108.029 mph (173.856 km/h)

Pole position
Driver	Chandler Smith	Kaulig Racing
- Time: 32.127

Most laps led
Driver	Justin Haley	Kaulig Racing
- Laps: 80

Winner
No. 20	John Hunter Nemechek	Joe Gibbs Racing

Television in the United States
- Network: USA
- Announcers: Rick Allen, Jeff Burton, Steve Letarte, and Dale Earnhardt Jr.

Radio in the United States
- Radio: PRN

The 2023 Alsco Uniforms 250 was the 17th stock car race of the 2023 NASCAR Xfinity Series, and the 3rd iteration of the event. The race was held on Saturday, July 8, 2023, in Hampton, Georgia at Atlanta Motor Speedway, a 1.54 miles (2.48 km) permanent quad-oval shaped racetrack. The race was originally scheduled to be contested over 163 laps, but was extended to 169 laps due to a NASCAR overtime finish. John Hunter Nemechek, driving for Joe Gibbs Racing, would take advantage of a late-race restart, and held off the Kaulig Racing trio to earn his 5th career NASCAR Xfinity Series win, and his third of the season. Justin Haley dominated most of the race, leading a race-high 80 laps. To fill out the podium, Daniel Hemric, driving for Kaulig Racing, and Cole Custer, driving for Stewart-Haas Racing, would finish 2nd and 3rd, respectively.

== Background ==
Atlanta Motor Speedway is a track in Hampton, Georgia, 20 miles (32 km) south of Atlanta. It is a 1.54-mile (2.48 km) quad-oval track with a seating capacity of 111,000. It opened in 1960 as a 1.5-mile (2.4 km) standard oval. In 1994, 46 condominiums were built over the northeastern side of the track. In 1997, to standardize the track with Speedway Motorsports' other two 1.5-mile (2.4 km) ovals, the entire track was almost completely rebuilt. The frontstretch and backstretch were swapped, and the configuration of the track was changed from oval to quad-oval. The project made the track one of the fastest on the NASCAR circuit.

=== Entry list ===
- (R) denotes rookie driver.
- (i) denotes driver who is ineligible for series driver points.3

#	Driver	Team	Make
00	Cole Custer	Stewart-Haas Racing	Ford
1	Sam Mayer	JR Motorsports	Chevrolet
02	Blaine Perkins (R)	Our Motorsports	Chevrolet
2	Sheldon Creed	Richard Childress Racing	Chevrolet
4	Garrett Smithley	JD Motorsports	Chevrolet
6	Brennan Poole	JD Motorsports	Chevrolet
07	Mason Maggio (i)	SS-Green Light Racing	Chevrolet
7	Justin Allgaier	JR Motorsports	Chevrolet
08	Mason Massey	SS-Green Light Racing	Chevrolet
8	Josh Berry	JR Motorsports	Chevrolet
9	Brandon Jones	JR Motorsports	Chevrolet
10	Justin Haley (i)	Kaulig Racing	Chevrolet
11	Daniel Hemric	Kaulig Racing	Chevrolet
16	Chandler Smith (R)	Kaulig Racing	Chevrolet
18	Sammy Smith (R)	Joe Gibbs Racing	Toyota
19	Ty Gibbs (i)	Joe Gibbs Racing	Toyota
20	John Hunter Nemechek	Joe Gibbs Racing	Toyota
21	Austin Hill	Richard Childress Racing	Chevrolet
24	Parker Chase	Sam Hunt Racing	Toyota
25	Brett Moffitt	AM Racing	Ford
26	Kaz Grala	Sam Hunt Racing	Toyota
27	Jeb Burton	Jordan Anderson Racing	Chevrolet
28	Kyle Sieg	RSS Racing	Ford
31	Parker Retzlaff (R)	Jordan Anderson Racing	Chevrolet
35	David Starr	Emerling-Gase Motorsports	Ford
36	Kyle Weatherman	DGM Racing	Chevrolet
38	Joe Graf Jr.	RSS Racing	Ford
39	Ryan Sieg	RSS Racing	Ford
43	Ryan Ellis	Alpha Prime Racing	Chevrolet
44	Greg Van Alst	Alpha Prime Racing	Chevrolet
45	Jeffrey Earnhardt	Alpha Prime Racing	Chevrolet
48	Parker Kligerman	Big Machine Racing	Chevrolet
51	Jeremy Clements	Jeremy Clements Racing	Chevrolet
53	Akinori Ogata (i)	Emerling-Gase Motorsports	Chevrolet
78	Anthony Alfredo	B. J. McLeod Motorsports	Chevrolet
91	Josh Bilicki	DGM Racing	Chevrolet
92	Josh Williams	DGM Racing	Chevrolet
98	Riley Herbst	Stewart-Haas Racing	Ford
Official entry list

== Qualifying ==
Qualifying was held on Saturday, July 8, at 4:05 PM EST. Since Atlanta Motor Speedway is an intermediate racetrack with superspeedway rules, the qualifying system used is a single-car, single-lap system with two rounds. In the first round, drivers have one lap to set a time. The fastest ten drivers from the first round move on to the second round. Whoever sets the fastest time in Round 2 wins the pole. Chandler Smith, driving for Kaulig Racing, would score the pole for the race, with a lap of 32.127, and an average speed of 172.565 mph (277.716 km/h) in the second round.

Pos.	#	Driver	Team	Make	Time (R1)	Speed (R1)	Time (R2)	Speed (R2)
1	16	Chandler Smith (R)	Kaulig Racing	Chevrolet	32.253	171.891	32.127	172.565
2	20	John Hunter Nemechek	Joe Gibbs Racing	Toyota	32.297	171.657	32.238	171.971
3	18	Sammy Smith (R)	Joe Gibbs Racing	Toyota	32.402	171.101	32.309	171.593
4	8	Josh Berry	JR Motorsports	Chevrolet	32.513	170.513	32.338	171.439
5	1	Sam Mayer	JR Motorsports	Chevrolet	32.416	171.416	32.338	171.439
6	98	Riley Herbst	Stewart-Haas Racing	Ford	32.428	170.428	32.363	171.307
7	00	Cole Custer	Stewart-Haas Racing	Ford	32.537	170.537	32.398	171.122
8	51	Jeremy Clements	Jeremy Clements Racing	Chevrolet	32.494	170.616	32.469	170.747
9	2	Sheldon Creed	Richard Childress Racing	Chevrolet	32.194	172.206	—	—
10	21	Austin Hill	Richard Childress Racing	Chevrolet	32.213	172.104	—	—
Eliminated from Round 1
11	11	Daniel Hemric	Kaulig Racing	Chevrolet	32.565	170.244	—	—
12	19	Ty Gibbs (i)	Joe Gibbs Racing	Toyota	32.606	170.030	—	—
13	10	Justin Haley (i)	Kaulig Racing	Chevrolet	32.620	169.957	—	—
14	7	Justin Allgaier	JR Motorsports	Chevrolet	32.625	169.931	—	—
15	9	Brandon Jones	JR Motorsports	Chevrolet	32.631	169.900	—	—
16	92	Josh Williams	DGM Racing	Chevrolet	32.650	169.801	—	—
17	48	Parker Kligerman	Big Machine Racing	Chevrolet	32.654	169.780	—	—
18	78	Anthony Alfredo	B. J. McLeod Motorsports	Chevrolet	32.729	169.391	—	—
19	45	Jeffrey Earnhardt	Alpha Prime Racing	Chevrolet	32.752	169.272	—	—
20	31	Parker Retzlaff (R)	Jordan Anderson Racing	Chevrolet	32.829	168.875	—	—
21	27	Jeb Burton	Jordan Anderson Racing	Chevrolet	32.841	168.813	—	—
22	02	Blaine Perkins (R)	Our Motorsports	Chevrolet	32.847	168.783	—	—
23	39	Ryan Sieg	RSS Racing	Ford	32.982	168.092	—	—
24	91	Josh Bilicki	DGM Racing	Chevrolet	32.993	168.036	—	—
25	24	Parker Chase	Sam Hunt Racing	Toyota	33.029	167.852	—	—
26	07	Mason Maggio (i)	SS-Green Light Racing	Chevrolet	33.086	167.563	—	—
27	25	Brett Moffitt	AM Racing	Ford	33.099	167.498	—	—
28	38	Joe Graf Jr.	RSS Racing	Ford	33.104	167.472	—	—
29	6	Brennan Poole	JD Motorsports	Chevrolet	33.199	166.993	—	—
30	43	Ryan Ellis	Alpha Prime Racing	Chevrolet	33.205	166.963	—	—
31	26	Kaz Grala	Sam Hunt Racing	Toyota	33.251	166.732	—	—
32	08	Mason Massey	SS-Green Light Racing	Chevrolet	33.251	166.732	—	—
33	36	Kyle Weatherman	DGM Racing	Chevrolet	33.305	166.461	—	—
Qualified by owner's points
34	28	Kyle Sieg	RSS Racing	Ford	33.355	166.212	—	—
35	35	David Starr	Emerling-Gase Motorsports	Ford	33.622	164.892	—	—
36	53	Akinori Ogata (i)	Emerling-Gase Motorsports	Chevrolet	33.751	164.262	—	—
37	4	Garrett Smithley	JD Motorsports	Chevrolet	34.368	161.313	—	—
38	44	Greg Van Alst	Alpha Prime Racing	Chevrolet	36.663	151.215	—	—
Official qualifying results
Official starting lineup

== Race results ==
Stage 1 Laps: 40

Pos.	#	Driver	Team	Make	Pts
1	98	Riley Herbst	Stewart-Haas Racing	Ford	10
2	8	Josh Berry	JR Motorsports	Chevrolet	9
3	16	Chandler Smith (R)	Kaulig Racing	Chevrolet	8
4	10	Justin Haley (i)	Kaulig Racing	Chevrolet	0
5	21	Austin Hill	Richard Childress Racing	Chevrolet	6
6	7	Justin Allgaier	JR Motorsports	Chevrolet	5
7	51	Jeremy Clements	Jeremy Clements Racing	Chevrolet	4
8	2	Sheldon Creed	Richard Childress Racing	Chevrolet	3
9	38	Joe Graf Jr.	RSS Racing	Ford	2
10	31	Parker Retzlaff (R)	Jordan Anderson Racing	Chevrolet	1

Stage 2 Laps: 40

Pos.	#	Driver	Team	Make	Pts
1	2	Sheldon Creed	Richard Childress Racing	Chevrolet	10
2	21	Austin Hill	Richard Childress Racing	Chevrolet	9
3	39	Ryan Sieg	RSS Racing	Ford	8
4	8	Josh Berry	JR Motorsports	Chevrolet	7
5	7	Justin Allgaier	JR Motorsports	Chevrolet	6
6	00	Cole Custer	Stewart-Haas Racing	Ford	5
7	11	Daniel Hemric	Kaulig Racing	Chevrolet	4
8	16	Chandler Smith (R)	Kaulig Racing	Chevrolet	3
9	48	Parker Kligerman	Big Machine Racing	Chevrolet	2
10	18	Sammy Smith (R)	Joe Gibbs Racing	Toyota	1

Stage 3 Laps: 89

Pos.	St	#	Driver	Team	Make	Laps	Led	Status	Pts
1	2	20	John Hunter Nemechek	Joe Gibbs Racing	Toyota	169	3	Running	40
2	11	11	Daniel Hemric	Kaulig Racing	Chevrolet	169	0	Running	39
3	7	00	Cole Custer	Stewart-Haas Racing	Ford	169	0	Running	39
4	13	10	Justin Haley (i)	Kaulig Racing	Chevrolet	169	80	Running	0
5	5	1	Sam Mayer	JR Motorsports	Chevrolet	169	0	Running	32
6	12	19	Ty Gibbs (i)	Joe Gibbs Racing	Toyota	169	0	Running	0
7	34	28	Kyle Sieg	RSS Racing	Ford	169	0	Running	30
8	17	48	Parker Kligerman	Big Machine Racing	Chevrolet	169	0	Running	31
9	16	92	Josh Williams	DGM Racing	Chevrolet	169	0	Running	28
10	3	18	Sammy Smith (R)	Joe Gibbs Racing	Toyota	169	0	Running	28
11	27	25	Brett Moffitt	AM Racing	Ford	169	0	Running	26
12	10	21	Austin Hill	Richard Childress Racing	Chevrolet	169	1	Running	40
13	21	27	Jeb Burton	Jordan Anderson Racing	Chevrolet	169	0	Running	24
14	31	26	Kaz Grala	Sam Hunt Racing	Toyota	169	0	Running	23
15	8	51	Jeremy Clements	Jeremy Clements Racing	Chevrolet	169	0	Running	26
16	20	31	Parker Retzlaff (R)	Jordan Anderson Racing	Chevrolet	169	0	Running	22
17	14	7	Justin Allgaier	JR Motorsports	Chevrolet	169	0	Running	31
18	24	91	Josh Bilicki	DGM Racing	Chevrolet	168	0	Running	19
19	4	8	Josh Berry	JR Motorsports	Chevrolet	168	34	Running	34
20	1	16	Chandler Smith (R)	Kaulig Racing	Chevrolet	168	5	Running	28
21	28	38	Joe Graf Jr.	RSS Racing	Ford	167	4	Running	18
22	35	35	David Starr	Emerling-Gase Motorsports	Ford	167	0	Running	15
23	19	45	Jeffrey Earnhardt	Alpha Prime Racing	Chevrolet	167	0	Running	14
24	32	08	Mason Massey	SS-Green Light Racing	Chevrolet	167	0	Running	13
25	30	43	Ryan Ellis	Alpha Prime Racing	Chevrolet	167	0	Running	12
26	37	4	Garrett Smithley	JD Motorsports	Chevrolet	167	0	Running	11
27	25	24	Parker Chase	Sam Hunt Racing	Toyota	167	0	Running	10
28	29	6	Brennan Poole	JD Motorsports	Chevrolet	165	0	Running	9
29	36	53	Akinori Ogata (i)	Emerling-Gase Motorsports	Chevrolet	103	0	Transmission	0
30	26	07	Mason Maggio (i)	SS-Green Light Racing	Chevrolet	102	0	Electrical	0
31	33	36	Kyle Weatherman	DGM Racing	Chevrolet	97	0	Accident	6
32	22	02	Blaine Perkins (R)	Our Motorsports	Chevrolet	96	0	Accident	5
33	15	9	Brandon Jones	JR Motorsports	Chevrolet	91	0	DVP	4
34	18	78	Anthony Alfredo	B. J. McLeod Motorsports	Chevrolet	90	0	DVP	3
35	9	2	Sheldon Creed	Richard Childress Racing	Chevrolet	88	24	Accident	15
36	6	98	Riley Herbst	Stewart-Haas Racing	Ford	88	3	Accident	11
37	23	39	Ryan Sieg	RSS Racing	Ford	87	15	Accident	9
38	38	44	Greg Van Alst	Alpha Prime Racing	Chevrolet	62	0	Accident	1
Official race results

== Standings after the race ==
Drivers' Championship standings

	Pos	Driver	Points
	1	John Hunter Nemechek	678
	2	Austin Hill	662 (-16)
	3	Cole Custer	633 (–45)
	4	Justin Allgaier	624 (–54)
	5	Chandler Smith	526 (–152)
	6	Josh Berry	518 (–160)
	7	Sam Mayer	490 (–198)
1	8	Daniel Hemric	475 (–203)
1	9	Sammy Smith	463 (–215)
2	10	Sheldon Creed	460 (–218)
	11	Riley Herbst	440 (–238)
	12	Parker Kligerman	434 (–244)
Official driver's standings

- Note: Only the first 12 positions are included for the driver standings.

Previous race: 2023 The Loop 121	NASCAR Xfinity Series; 2023 season	Next race: 2023 Ambetter Health 200
