= Jesse Love =

American racing driver (born 2005)

- Love at Las Vegas Motor Speedway in 2026
- Born: Jesshill Michael Gregory Love Jr. January 14, 2005 (age 21); Menlo Park, California, U.S.
- Achievements: 2025 NASCAR Xfinity Series Champion; 2023 ARCA Menards Series Champion; 2020, 2021 ARCA Menards Series West Champion; 2018 Bay Cities Racing Association Midgets Champion; 2016, 2017 USAC Speed2 Western US Dirt Midget Series Champion; 2017 USAC Speed2 Western US Asphalt Midget Series Champion
- Awards: 2024 NASCAR Xfinity Series Rookie of the Year

NASCAR Cup Series career
- 7 races run over 2 years
- Car no., team: No. 21 (Wood Brothers Racing)
- 2026 position: 51st
- Best finish: 51st (2026)
- First race: 2025 Food City 500 (Bristol)
- Last race: 2026 Jack Link's 500 (Talladega)
Wins	Top tens	Poles
0	0	0

NASCAR O'Reilly Auto Parts Series career
- 99 races run over 3 years
- 2026 position: 2nd
- Best finish: 1st (2025)
- First race: 2024 United Rentals 300 (Daytona)
- Last race: 2026 O'Reilly Auto Parts 300 (Homestead)
- First win: 2024 Ag-Pro 300 (Talladega)
- Last win: 2026 Timberland PRO 200 (Phoenix)
Wins	Top tens	Poles
5	59	12

NASCAR FedEx Freight Truck Series career
- 4 races run over 2 years
- 2026 position: 120th
- Best finish: 37th (2023)
- First race: 2023 Toyota 200 (Gateway)
- Last race: 2026 Allegiance 200 (Nashville)
Wins	Top tens	Poles
0	2	0

ARCA Menards Series career
- 48 races run over 4 years
- Best finish: 1st (2023)
- First race: 2020 General Tire 150 (Phoenix)
- Last race: 2023 Shore Lunch 200 (Toledo)
- First win: 2021 Sioux Chief PowerPex 200 (Salem)
- Last win: 2023 Atlas 200 (Salem)
Wins	Top tens	Poles
12	42	11

ARCA Menards Series East career
- 14 races run over 4 years
- Best finish: 9th (2022)
- First race: 2020 Skip's Western Outfitters 175 (New Smyrna)
- Last race: 2023 Bush's Beans 200 (Bristol)
- First win: 2023 Reese's 200 (IRP)
Wins	Top tens	Poles
1	11	2

ARCA Menards Series West career
- 23 races run over 4 years
- Best finish: 1st (2020, 2021)
- First race: 2020 Star Nursery 150 (Las Vegas Bullring)
- Last race: 2023 General Tire 150 (Phoenix)
- First win: 2020 ENEOS/ Sunrise Ford Twin 30 Race #1 (Tooele)
- Last win: 2021 NAPA Auto Parts 150 (Irwindale)
Wins	Top tens	Poles
5	17	4
- Statistics up to date as of November 8, 2026.

Jesshill Michael Gregory Love Jr. (born January 14, 2005) is an American professional stock car racing driver. He competes full-time in the NASCAR Cup Series, driving the No. 21 Ford Mustang Dark Horse for Wood Brothers Racing. He has previously competed in the NASCAR O'Reilly Auto Parts Series.

Love currently holds two records: He is the youngest winner ever in the ARCA Menards Series West, and the youngest winner ever in any NASCAR-sanctioned event, both at 15 years, 5 months, and 13 days. He is also the youngest driver to win a NASCAR sanctioned championship, having won the ARCA Menards Series West championship in 2020 at age 15. He also won the NASCAR Xfinity Series championship in 2025, the ARCA West championship in 2021, and the ARCA Menards Series championship in 2023.

== Racing career ==
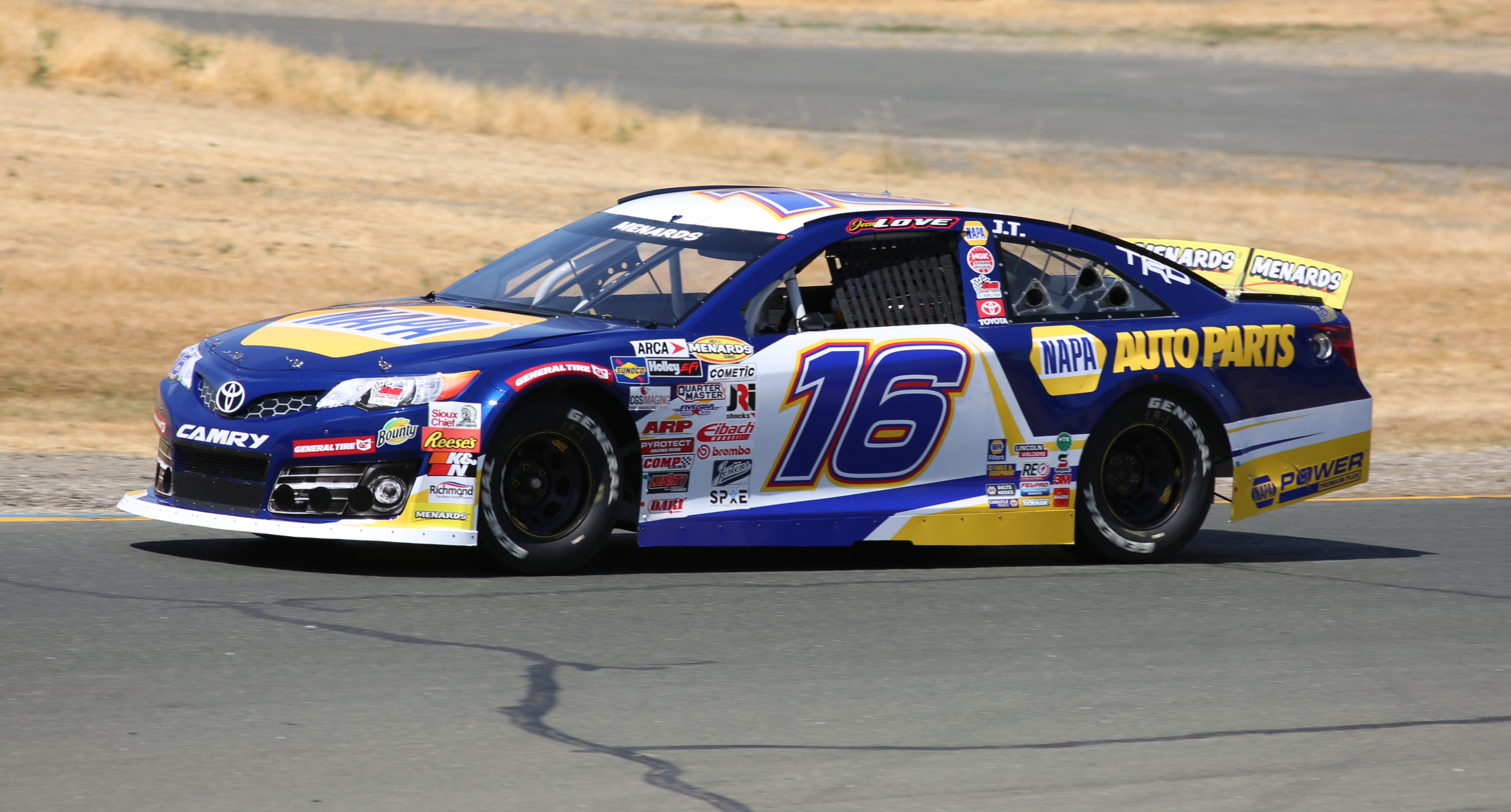
Love competing at Sonoma Raceway in 2021

=== Early career ===
Love began racing at age five. Early in his career, he drove in the Quarter Midgets of America Series, where he won multiple races and championships before turning ten years old. He then went on to win championships in three different divisions of USAC in the same year, becoming the first driver to accomplish that. At the age of thirteen, Love, competing for Naake-Klauer Motorsports, was granted an age waiver to compete in the RPM Pro Late Model Series by Madera Speedway track promoter Kenny Shepherd due to his talent in the 51Fifty Energy Drink Jr. Late Model Series the prior year (in which he won another championship). In 2018, Love drove full-time in the INEX Legend Car Racing Series, winning five of the eight races on the schedule en route to that series' championship. The other series he raced in that year were the BCRA Midget Series and the Hunt Magneto Sprint Car Series, both of whom Love had to apply for an age exception to participate in. Love drove for Keith Kunz Motorsports in the SRL Southwest Tour, a late model racing series, in 2019.

=== ARCA ===
On January 14, 2020, it was announced that Love would run full-time and for rookie of the year in the ARCA Menards Series West in the No. 19 Toyota for Bill McAnally Racing. He replaced Hailie Deegan in that car, who left the McAnally team and Toyota's driver development program to join Ford's driver development program, running full-time in the twenty-race ARCA Menards Series for DGR-Crosley.

After finishing second in the season-opener at Las Vegas Bullring, Love won his first West Series race in the first of the two races in the doubleheader at the Utah Motorsports Campus road course on June 27. It was just his second start in the series.

In addition, Love and his BMR teammates would compete in the ten races of the twenty-race ARCA Menards Series' Sioux Chief Showdown. He made his debut in the first Showdown race at Phoenix Raceway on March 6. A few weeks earlier, Love and his teammates also made their debut in the ARCA Menards Series East at New Smyrna; Love finished twelfth.

Love finished the 2020 ARCA West season with three wins and nine top-five finishes in eleven races en route to the championship, beating out season-long rival Blaine Perkins. He became the youngest West Series champion at just fifteen years, nine months, and 24 days old.

In 2021, Love returned to BMR for his second season in the West Series, and moved from the No. 19 to the No. 16, replacing Gio Scelzi with the team condensing from four full-time cars to two and the No. 19 car being closed down. He also returned to Venturini Motorsports for a nine-race schedule in the main ARCA Menards Series (including all three combination races with the ARCA Menards Series East) as well as one non-combination race in the East Series (at Dover). In both series, he drove the No. 25. He earned his first career win of the season at Salem Speedway, outdueling Ty Gibbs in a restart with 46 laps to go.

On January 3, 2022, it was announced that Love would return to Venturini Motorsports for the majority of the 2022 season, running all of the races where he was eligible. During the season, he earned eight top fives and twelve top tens. He would also earn his second career ARCA win at the Illinois State Fairgrounds Racetrack, leading every lap in a dominating fashion.

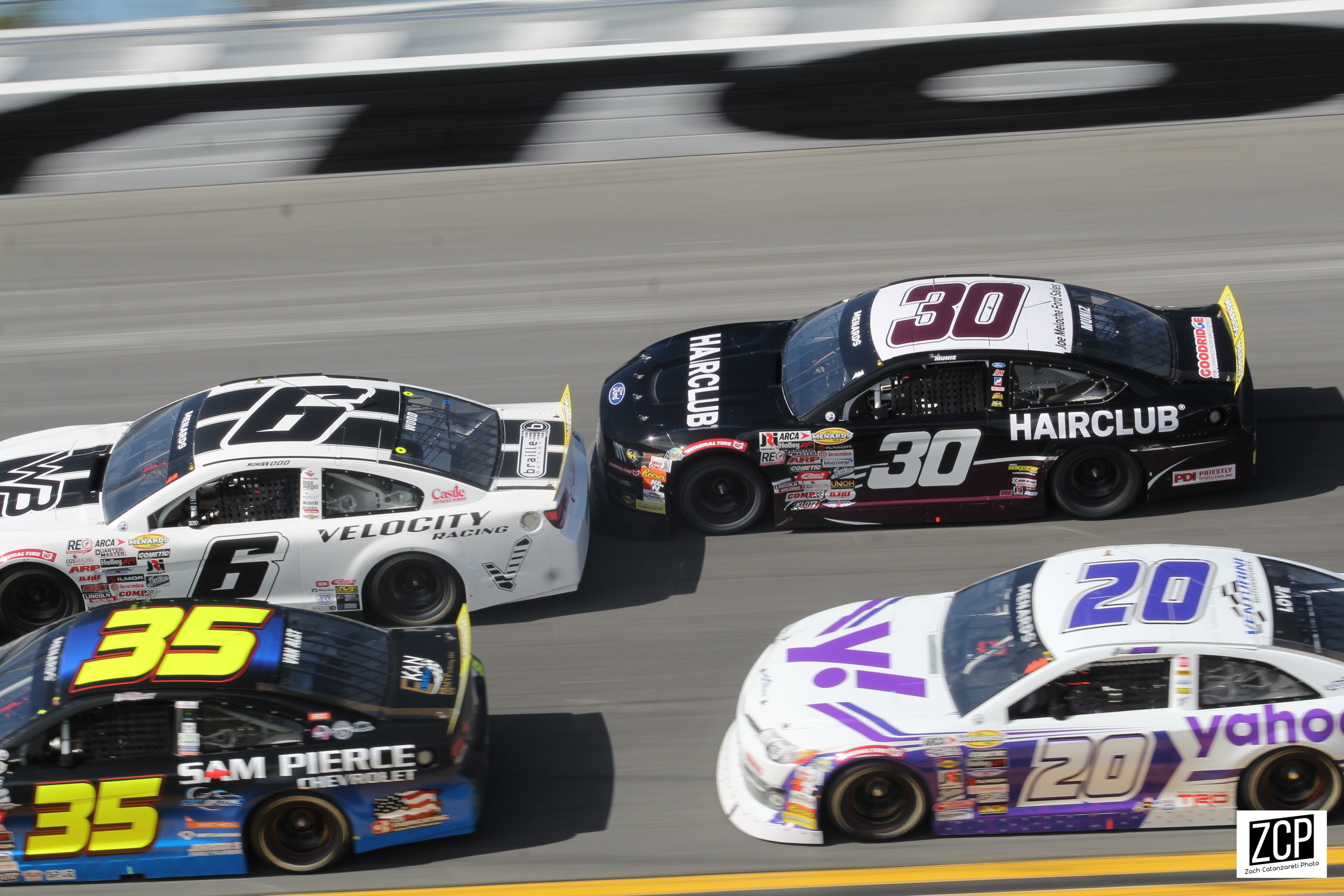
Love driving the number 20 Yahoo car at Daytona in 2023

Love would be upgraded to a full-time schedule with Venturini Motorsports in the 2023 season. That year, Love would have a breakout season, earning ten wins, eighteen top-tens, and seventeen top-fives. He would ultimately claim the 2023 ARCA Menards Series championship one race early at Salem, after simply taking the green flag.

=== NASCAR Craftsman Truck Series ===
==== 2023 ====
On February 9, 2023, it was announced that Love would run three NASCAR Craftsman Truck Series races for Tricon Garage, driving their No. 1 truck. At Gateway, Love made his debut in the No. 11 truck due to the original driver, Corey Heim, having an illness. Toni Breidinger would drive the No. 1 truck for that race. Love would end up finishing in the top-ten in ninth. He made his second start of the season at Kansas, finishing thirteenth.

=== NASCAR O'Reilly Auto Parts Series ===
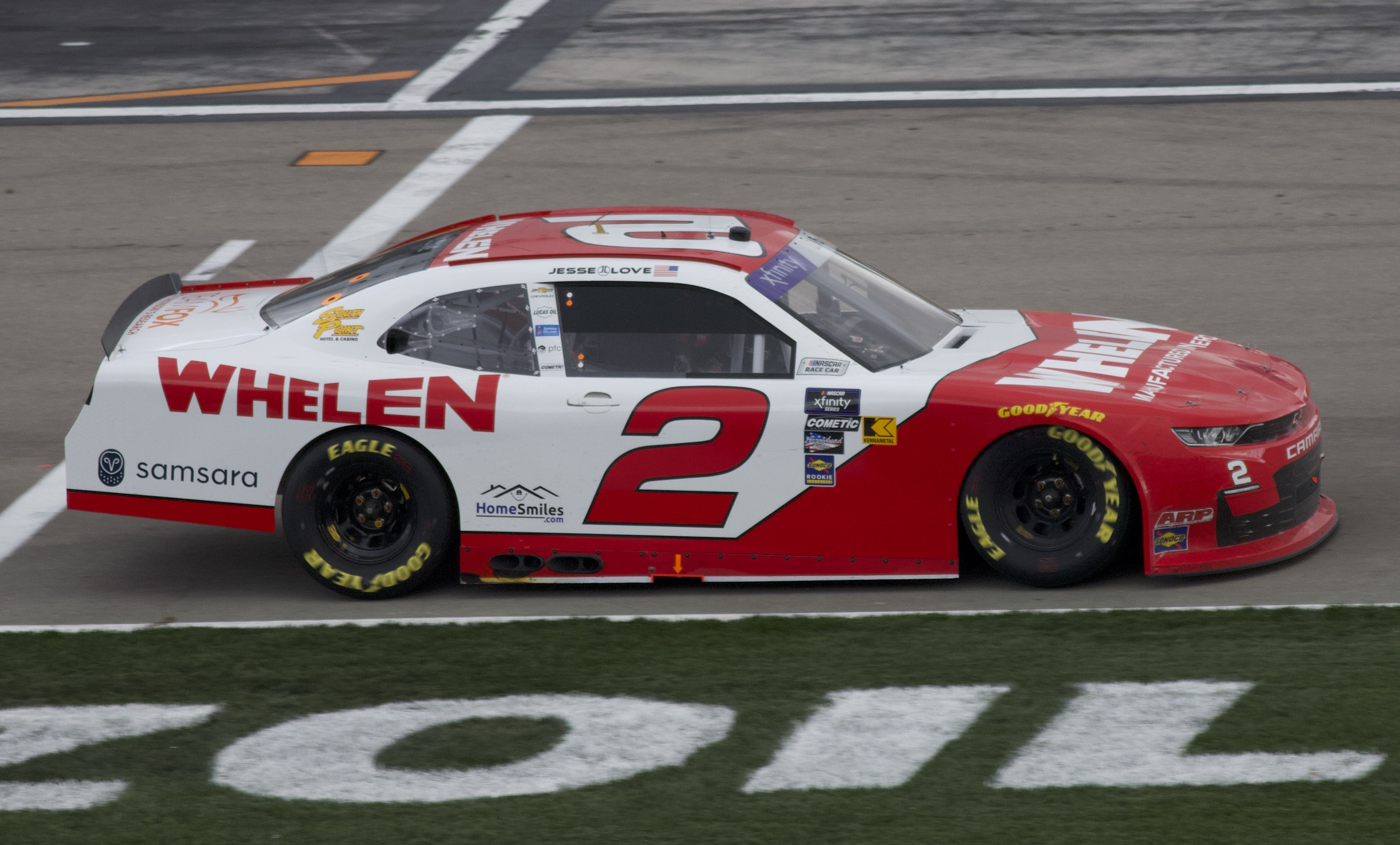
Love's No. 2 car at Las Vegas Motor Speedway in 2024.

==== 2024 ====
On October 25, 2023, it was announced that Love would bypass the truck series, to drive full-time for Richard Childress Racing in the No. 2 Chevrolet in 2024, replacing Sheldon Creed. He began the season by winning the pole in his first career start at Daytona. He won the first stage and led a race-high 34 laps, before getting involved in a wreck during stage two. He went on to finish the race in twentieth. The following week at Atlanta, Love once again won the pole and went on to have a blistering performance, sweeping both stages and leading 157 of the 163 scheduled laps. The race went into overtime after multiple drivers ran out of fuel with two laps to go. Love sputtered his fuel tank on the final restart, and ultimately fell back to finish twelfth. At Phoenix, he had another solid run, and earned a career best second-place finish, only behind race winner Chandler Smith. The following four weeks, he continued a streak of top-ten finishes, including his third career pole at Texas. At Talladega, Love scored his first career win, holding off the field on an overtime restart.

==== 2025: Series champion ====
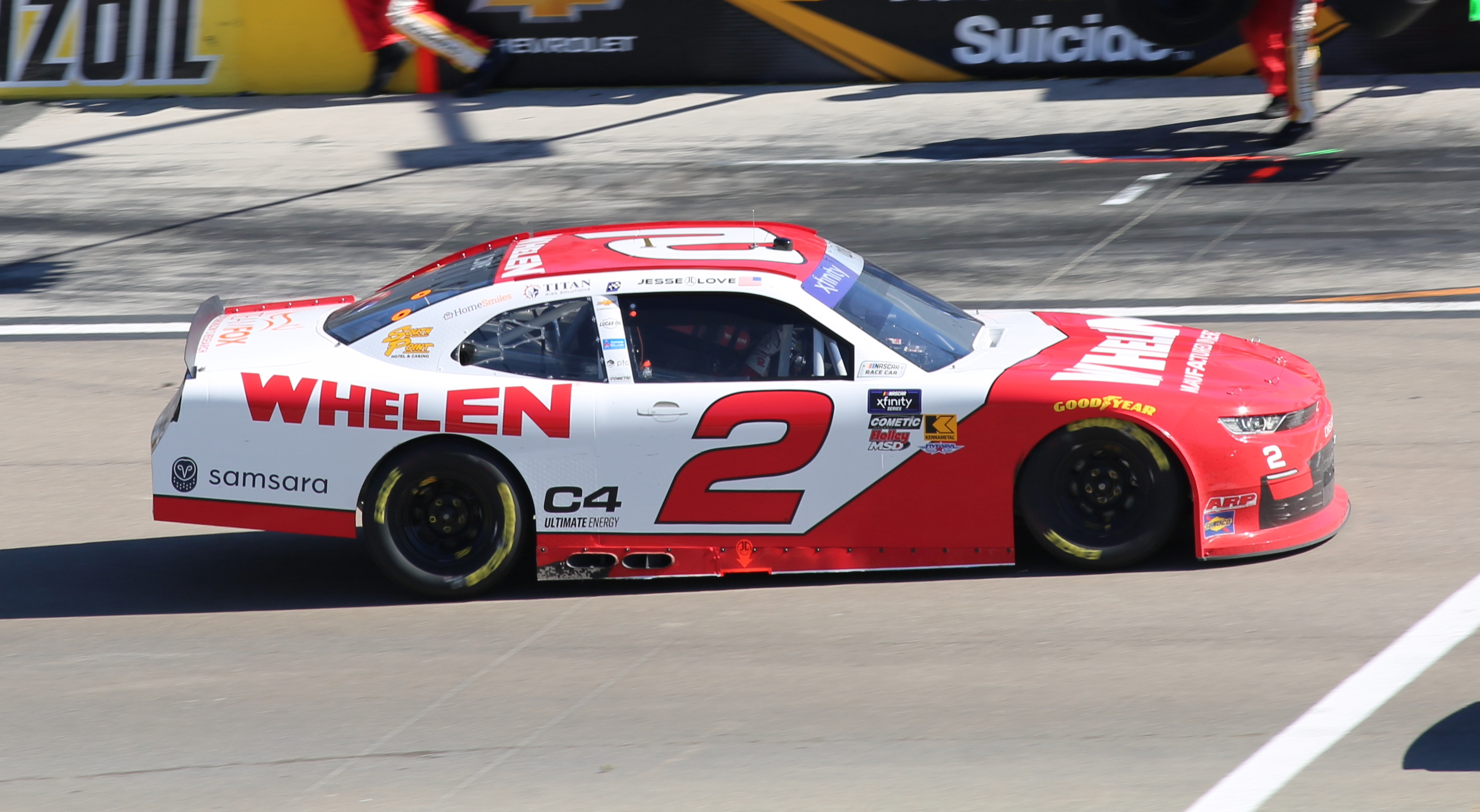
Love's No. 2 car at Las Vegas Motor Speedway in 2025

Love started the 2025 season with a win at Daytona. Two months later, he won at Rockingham, but was disqualified after failing post race inspection; as a result, Sammy Smith was declared the winner. Love stayed consistent throughout the playoffs until he won at Phoenix to claim the Xfinity Series championship.

==== 2026: Consistency ====
Love started the season with a ninth-place finish at Daytona. Love led late at Phoenix, but was passed by eventual winner Justin Allgaier with ten laps to go. Following the race at Atlanta, Love earned a spot in "The Chase". He earned his first wins of the season in "The Chase" at Gateway and Phoenix.

=== NASCAR Cup Series ===
==== 2025-2026: Part-time basis ====
On March 28, 2025, it was announced that Love would make his NASCAR Cup Series debut at Bristol Motor Speedway for RCR, driving the No. 33 Chevrolet. Love started 19th and finished 31st five laps down. On April 16, it was announced that Love would drive for Beard Motorsports in the No. 62 at Texas Motor Speedway and Indianapolis Motor Speedway.

Love returned to the No. 33 in 2026, running races at Austin and Talladega. Love was planned to run Charlotte, but the team scrapped the plans. Love was scheduled to run more races in the No. 33 prior to the death of Kyle Busch, in which they rebranded his No. 8 to the No. 33 for the remainder of the season, with O'Reilly teammate Austin Hill driving the car for the remainder of the season.

==== 2027: First full-time season ====
On June 17, 2026, Wood Brothers Racing announced that Love will drive the No. 21 for them for 2027.

=== Other racing ===
==== Super2 Series ====
In October 2025, it was revealed that Love would make his debut in the Super2 Series at the Adelaide Street Circuit, driving a Holden Commodore ZB for Image Racing in an alliance with Erebus Motorsport and Richard Childress Racing.

In 2026, it was revealed that Love will once again race for Image Racing at Adelaide, in what will be his last racing start in equipment from Chevrolet before moving to Ford in NASCAR.

== Personal life ==
Love is the son of Elizabeth and Jesshill Love. Jesshill raced midget cars in his youth and is a real estate investor and lawyer. Jesshill is the CEO of three real estate portfolios in California, former president of the Silicon Valley Chapter of the Entrepreneurs' Organization, and the CEO of HomeSmiles, a property maintenance company that supports Jesse's racing endeavors.

Love is of partial Mexican descent through his mother, who was raised in Mexico City.

== Motorsports career results ==
=== Career summary ===
Season	Series	Team	Races	Wins	Top 5	Top 10	Points	Position
2020	ARCA Menards Series	Venturini Motorsports	1	0	1	1	139	26th
2020	ARCA Menards Series	Bill McAnally Racing	3	0	1	1	139	26th
2020	ARCA Menards Series East	Venturini Motorsports	1	0	0	1	120	13th
2020	ARCA Menards Series East	Bill McAnally Racing	1	0	0	0	120	13th
2020	ARCA Menards Series West	Bill McAnally Racing	11	3	9	10	613	**1st**
2021	ARCA Menards Series	Venturini Motorsports	10	1	5	8	386	10th
2021	ARCA Menards Series	Bill McAnally Racing	1	0	0	1	386	10th
2021	ARCA Menards Series East	Venturini Motorsports	4	0	0	3	182	11th
2021	ARCA Menards Series West	Bill McAnally Racing	9	2	4	5	438	**1st**
2022	ARCA Menards Series	Venturini Motorsports	14	1	8	12	603	11th
2022	ARCA Menards Series East	Venturini Motorsports	4	0	1	3	197	9th
2022	ARCA Menards Series West	Venturini Motorsports	2	0	1	2	130	26th
2023	ARCA Menards Series	Venturini Motorsports	20	10	17	18	1057	**1st**
2023	ARCA Menards Series East	Venturini Motorsports	4	1	4	4	227	10th
2023	ARCA Menards Series West	Venturini Motorsports	1	0	0	0	18	71st
2023	NASCAR Craftsman Truck Series	Tricon Garage	3	0	1	2	85	37th
2024	NASCAR Xfinity Series	Richard Childress Racing	33	1	7	18	2247	8th
2025	NASCAR Cup Series	Beard Motorsports	2	0	0	0	0	NC†
2025	NASCAR Cup Series	Richard Childress Racing	3	0	0	0	0	NC†
2025	NASCAR Xfinity Series	Richard Childress Racing	33	2	9	22	4040	**1st**
2025	Super2 Series	Image Racing	2	0	0	0	63	25th
2025	Mazda MX-5 Cup	BSI Racing	2	0	0	0	390	42nd
2026	NASCAR Cup Series	Richard Childress Racing	2	0	0	0	0	NC†
2026	NASCAR O'Reilly Auto Parts Series	Richard Childress Racing	33	2	13	19	2463	**2nd**
2026	NASCAR Craftsman Truck Series	Spire Motorsports	1	0	0	0	0	NC†
2026	CARS Late Model Stock Car Tour	Matt Piercy Racing	1	0	0	0	16	91st
2026	Super2 Series	Image Racing						

^{†} As Love was a guest driver, he was ineligible for championship points.

=== NASCAR ===
(key) (Bold – Pole position awarded by qualifying time. Italics – Pole position earned by points standings or practice time. * – Most laps led.)

==== Cup Series ====
NASCAR Cup Series results
Year	Team	No.	Make	1	2	3	4	5	6	7	8	9	10	11	12	13	14	15	16	17	18	19	20	21	22	23	24	25	26	27	28	29	30	31	32	33	34	35	36	NCSC	Pts	Ref
2025	Richard Childress Racing	33	Chevy	DAY	ATL	COA	PHO	LVS	HOM	MAR	DAR	BRI; 31	TAL		KAN; 29	CLT	NSH	MCH	MXC	POC	ATL	CSC	SON	DOV				RCH; 33	DAY	DAR	GTW	BRI	NHA	KAN	ROV	LVS	TAL	MAR	PHO	54th	0^{1}	
2025	Beard Motorsports	62	Chevy											TEX; 31											IND; 24	IOW	GLN													54th	0^{1}	
2026	Richard Childress Racing	33	Chevy	DAY	ATL	COA; 27	PHO	LVS	DAR	MAR	BRI	KAN	TAL; 27	TEX	GLN	CLT	NSH	MCH	POC	COR	SON	CHI	ATL	NWS	IND	IOW	RCH	NHA	DAY	DAR	GTW	BRI	KAN	LVS	CLT	PHO	TAL	MAR	HOM	51st	0^{1}	

==== O'Reilly Auto Parts Series ====
NASCAR O'Reilly Auto Parts Series results
Year	Team	No.	Make	1	2	3	4	5	6	7	8	9	10	11	12	13	14	15	16	17	18	19	20	21	22	23	24	25	26	27	28	29	30	31	32	33	NOAPSC	Pts	Ref
2024	Richard Childress Racing	2	Chevy	**DAY**; 20*	**ATL**; 12*	LVS; 17	PHO; 2	COA; 6	RCH; 5	MAR; 9	**TEX**; 9	TAL; 1	DOV; 24	DAR; 8	CLT; 28	PIR; 19	SON; 12	IOW; 31	NHA; 13	NSH; 3	CSC; 5*	POC; 22	IND; 13	MCH; 29	DAY; 21	DAR; 6	**ATL**; 6	GLN; 8	BRI; 4	KAN; 9	**TAL**; 6*	ROV; 19	LVS; 6	HOM; 4	MAR; 12	PHO; 6	8th	2247	
2025	Richard Childress Racing	2	Chevy	DAY; 1	**ATL**; 16	COA; 6	PHO; 9	LVS; 3	HOM; 6	MAR; 37	DAR; 11	BRI; 6	CAR; 37	**TAL**; 3*	TEX; 7	CLT; 12	NSH; 8	MXC; 18	POC; 2	ATL; 6	CSC; 6	SON; 38	DOV; 5	IND; 9	**IOW**; 2	GLN; 14	DAY; 4	PIR; 10	GTW; 5	BRI; 25	KAN; 7	ROV; 12	LVS; 6	**TAL**; 10	MAR; 23	PHO; 1	1st	4040	
2026	Richard Childress Racing	2	Chevy	DAY; 9	ATL; 5	COA; 4	PHO; 2*	LVS; 6	DAR; 11	MAR; 12	CAR; 27	BRI; 12	KAN; 4	**TAL**; 7*	TEX; 9	GLN; 2	DOV; 23	CLT; 2	NSH; 16*	POC; 37	COR; 6	SON; 9	CHI; 3	ATL; 26	IND; 16	IOW; 35	DAY; 20	DAR; 13	GTW; 1	BRI; 17	LVS; 3	CLT; 2*	**PHO**; 1*	**TAL**; 3	MAR; 30	HOM; 4	2nd	2463	

==== Craftsman Truck Series ====
NASCAR Craftsman Truck Series results
Year	Team	No.	Make	1	2	3	4	5	6	7	8	9	10	11	12	13	14	15	16	17	18	19	20	21	22	23	24	25	NCTC	Pts	Ref
2023	Tricon Garage	11	Toyota	DAY	LVS	ATL	COA	TEX	BRD	MAR	KAN	DAR	NWS	CLT	GTW; 9	NSH	MOH	POC	RCH	IRP	MLW								37th	85	
2023	Tricon Garage	1	Toyota																			KAN; 13	BRI	TAL	HOM	PHO; 4			37th	85	
2026	Spire Motorsports	77	Chevy	DAY	ATL	STP	DAR	CAR	BRI	TEX	GLN	DOV	CLT	NSH; 34	MCH	COR	LRP	NWS	IRP	RCH	NHA	BRI	KAN	CLT	PHO	TAL	MAR	HOM	120th	0^{1}	

^{*} Season still in progress
^{1} Ineligible for series points

=== ARCA Menards Series ===
(key) (Bold – Pole position awarded by qualifying time. Italics – Pole position earned by points standings or practice time. * – Most laps led.)

ARCA Menards Series results
Year	Team	No.	Make	1	2	3	4	5	6	7	8	9	10	11	12	13	14	15	16	17	18	19	20	AMSC	Pts	Ref
2020	Bill McAnally Racing	19	Toyota	DAY	PHO; 16	TAL	POC	IRP	KEN	IOW; 12	KAN	TOL	TOL	MCH	DRC	GTW; 5	L44	TOL	BRI					26th	139	
2020	Venturini Motorsports	20	Toyota																	WIN; 4	MEM	ISF	KAN	26th	139	
2021	Bill McAnally Racing	16	Toyota	DAY	PHO; 6	TAL	KAN																	10th	386	
2021	Venturini Motorsports	15	Toyota					TOL; 4	CLT	MOH	POC	ELK; 2	BLN; 5					ISF; 5	MLW; 7	DSF; 10		SLM; 1	KAN	10th	386	
2021	Venturini Motorsports	25	Toyota											IOW; 7	WIN	GLN	MCH				BRI; 7			10th	386	
2022	Venturini Motorsports	20	Toyota	DAY	PHO; 6	TAL	KAN	CLT	**IOW**; 13	BLN; 3	ELK; 2	MOH; 5	POC; 13	IRP; 6	MCH	GLN; 3	ISF; 1**	MLW; 7	DSF; 2	KAN	BRI; 10	SLM; 2	**TOL**; 2*	11th	603	
2023	Venturini Motorsports	20	Toyota	DAY; 7	PHO; 27	TAL; 1*	**KAN**; 1*	**CLT**; 1*	**BLN**; 2*	ELK; 1*	MOH; 4	IOW; 3	POC; 1*	MCH; 1	**IRP**; 1*	GLN; 1	ISF; 3	MLW; 2	DSF; 1	**KAN**; 19	BRI; 2*	**SLM**; 1**	**TOL**; 2	1st	1057	

==== ARCA Menards Series East ====
ARCA Menards Series East results
Year	Team	No.	Make	1	2	3	4	5	6	7	8	AMSEC	Pts	Ref
2020	Bill McAnally Racing	19	Toyota	NSM; 12	TOL	DOV	TOL	BRI				13th	120	
2020	Venturini Motorsports	15	Toyota						FIF; 6			13th	120	
2021	Venturini Motorsports	25	Toyota	NSM	FIF	NSV	DOV; 18	SNM	IOW; 7		BRI; 7	11th	182	
2021	Venturini Motorsports	15	Toyota							MLW; 7		11th	182	
2022	Venturini Motorsports	20	Toyota	NSM	FIF	DOV; 2	NSV	**IOW**; 13	MLW; 7	BRI; 10		9th	197	
2023	Venturini Motorsports	20	Toyota	FIF	DOV	NSV	FRS	IOW; 3	**IRP**; 1*	MLW; 2	BRI; 2*	10th	227	

==== ARCA Menards Series West ====
ARCA Menards Series West results
Year	Team	No.	Make	1	2	3	4	5	6	7	8	9	10	11	12	AMSWC	Pts	Ref
2020	Bill McAnally Racing	19	Toyota	LVS; 2	MMP; 1*	MMP; 2	**IRW**; 1*	EVG; 4	DCS; 3	**CNS**; 1*	LVS; 3	AAS; 4	**KCR**; 8	PHO; 14		1st	613	
2021	Bill McAnally Racing	16	Toyota	PHO; 6	SON; 19	IRW; 1	CNS; 2*	IRW; 1	PIR; 3	LVS; 13	AAS; 12	PHO; 14				1st	438	
2022	Venturini Motorsports	20	Toyota	PHO; 6	IRW	KCR	PIR	SON	IRW	EVG	PIR	AAS	LVS	PHO; 2		26th	130	
2023	Venturini Motorsports	20	Toyota	PHO; 27	IRW	KCR	PIR	SON	IRW	SHA	EVG	AAS	LVS	MAD	PHO	71st	18	

=== CARS Late Model Stock Car Tour ===
(key) (Bold – Pole position awarded by qualifying time. Italics – Pole position earned by points standings or practice time. * – Most laps led. ** – All laps led.)

CARS Late Model Stock Car Tour results
Year	Team	No.	Make	1	2	3	4	5	6	7	8	9	10	11	12	13	14	CLMSCTC	Pts	Ref
2026	Matt Piercy Racing	7	Chevy	SNM	WCS	NSV	CRW	ACE	LGY	DOM	NWS; 26	HCY	AND	FLC	TCM	NPS	SBO	91st	16	

=== CARS Super Late Model Tour ===
(key)

CARS Super Late Model Tour results
Year	Team	No.	Make	1	2	3	4	5	6	7	8	CSLMTC	Pts	Ref
2021	Chris Wimmer	21L	Toyota	HCY	GPS; 24	NSH	JEN	HCY	MMS	TCM	SBO	N/A	0	

=== ASA STARS National Tour ===
(key) (Bold – Pole position awarded by qualifying time. Italics – Pole position earned by points standings or practice time. * – Most laps led. ** – All laps led.)

ASA STARS National Tour results
Year	Team	No.	Make	1	2	3	4	5	6	7	8	9	10	ASNTC	Pts	Ref
2023	Wilson Motorsports	20	Toyota	FIF	MAD	NWS	HCY; 11	MLW	AND	WIR	TOL; 1	WIN	NSV	23rd	155	

=== Super2 Series results ===
(key) (Race results only)

Super2 Series results
Year	Team	No.	Car	1	2	3	4	5	6	7	8	9	10	11	12	Position	Points
2025	Image Racing	57	Holden Commodore ZB	SMP; R1	SMP; R2	SYM; R3	SYM; R4	TOW; R5	TOW; R6	QLD; R7	QLD; R8	BAT; R9	BAT; R10	ADE; R11; Ret	ADE; R12; 14	25th	63

Sporting positions
Preceded by Justin Allgaier	NASCAR Xfinity Series Champion; 2025	Succeeded by Incumbent
Preceded by Nick Sanchez	ARCA Menards Series Champion; 2023	Succeeded by Andrés Pérez de Lara
