= 2024 United Rentals 300 =

1st race of the 2024 NASCAR Xfinity Series

Race details
- Race 1 of 33 of the 2024 NASCAR Xfinity Series
- Date: February 19, 2024
- Official name: 43rd Annual United Rentals 300
- Location: Daytona International Speedway, Daytona Beach, Florida
- Course: Permanent racing facility
- Course length: 2.5 miles (4.0 km)
- Distance: 120 laps, 300 mi (480 km)
- Scheduled distance: 120 laps, 300 mi (480 km)
- Average speed: 108.119 mph (174.001 km/h)

Pole position
Driver	Jesse Love	Richard Childress Racing
- Time: 49.702

Most laps led
Driver	Jesse Love	Richard Childress Racing
- Laps: 34

Winner
No. 21	Austin Hill	Richard Childress Racing

Television in the United States
- Network: FS1
- Announcers: Adam Alexander, Andy Petree, and Michael Waltrip

Radio in the United States
- Radio: MRN

The 2024 United Rentals 300 was the 1st stock car race of the 2024 NASCAR Xfinity Series, and the 43rd iteration of the event. The race was originally scheduled to be held on Saturday, February 17, 2024, but was later postponed to Monday, February 19, due to consistent rain showers. The race was held at Daytona International Speedway in Daytona Beach, Florida, a 2.5 miles (4.0 km) permanent tri-oval shaped asphalt superspeedway. The race took the scheduled 120 laps to complete. In a wild race that saw numerous lead changes, Austin Hill, driving for Richard Childress Racing, would overcome from a late pit road penalty, and held off the leaders on the final restart to earn his seventh career NASCAR Xfinity Series win, and his first of the season. It was also his third consecutive win in the season-opener Daytona race. Jesse Love, Hill's teammate, started on the pole and led a race-high 34 laps, before being involved in a wreck during Stage 2. To fill out the podium, Sheldon Creed, driving for Joe Gibbs Racing, and Parker Retzlaff, driving for Jordan Anderson Racing, would finish 2nd and 3rd, respectively.

== Report ==
Daytona International Speedway is a race track in Daytona Beach, Florida that is one of five superspeedways, the others being Pocono Raceway, Indianapolis Motor Speedway, Michigan International Speedway, and Talladega Superspeedway.

=== Background ===
Daytona International Speedway, the circuit where the race will be held.

Daytona International Speedway is one of three superspeedways to hold NASCAR races, the other two being Atlanta Motor Speedway and Talladega Superspeedway. The standard track at Daytona International Speedway is a four-turn superspeedway that is 2.5 miles (4.0 km) long. The track's turns are banked at 31 degrees, while the front stretch, the location of the finish line, is banked at 18 degrees.

==== Entry list ====
- (R) denotes rookie driver.
- (i) denotes driver who is ineligible for series driver points.

#	Driver	Team	Make
00	Cole Custer	Stewart–Haas Racing	Ford
1	Sam Mayer	JR Motorsports	Chevrolet
2	Jesse Love (R)	Richard Childress Racing	Chevrolet
4	Dawson Cram (R)	JD Motorsports	Chevrolet
5	Anthony Alfredo	Our Motorsports	Chevrolet
6	Garrett Smithley	JD Motorsports	Chevrolet
07	Patrick Emerling	SS-Green Light Racing	Chevrolet
7	Justin Allgaier	JR Motorsports	Chevrolet
8	Sammy Smith	JR Motorsports	Chevrolet
9	Brandon Jones	JR Motorsports	Chevrolet
10	Daniel Dye (i)	Kaulig Racing	Chevrolet
11	Josh Williams	Kaulig Racing	Chevrolet
14	Daniel Suárez (i)	SS-Green Light Racing	Chevrolet
15	Hailie Deegan (R)	AM Racing	Ford
16	A. J. Allmendinger	Kaulig Racing	Chevrolet
18	Sheldon Creed	Joe Gibbs Racing	Toyota
19	Ryan Truex	Joe Gibbs Racing	Toyota
20	John Hunter Nemechek (i)	Joe Gibbs Racing	Toyota
21	Austin Hill	Richard Childress Racing	Chevrolet
26	Sage Karam	Sam Hunt Racing	Toyota
27	Jeb Burton	Jordan Anderson Racing	Chevrolet
28	Kyle Sieg	RSS Racing	Ford
29	Blaine Perkins	RSS Racing	Ford
31	Parker Retzlaff	Jordan Anderson Racing	Chevrolet
32	Jordan Anderson	Jordan Anderson Racing	Chevrolet
35	Frankie Muniz	Joey Gase Motorsports	Ford
36	Natalie Decker	DGM Racing	Chevrolet
38	C. J. McLaughlin	RSS Racing	Ford
39	Ryan Sieg	RSS Racing	Ford
42	Leland Honeyman (R)	Young's Motorsports	Chevrolet
43	Ryan Ellis	Alpha Prime Racing	Chevrolet
44	Brennan Poole	Alpha Prime Racing	Chevrolet
45	Caesar Bacarella	Alpha Prime Racing	Chevrolet
48	Parker Kligerman	Big Machine Racing	Chevrolet
51	Jeremy Clements	Jeremy Clements Racing	Chevrolet
53	Joey Gase	Joey Gase Motorsports	Chevrolet
66	David Starr	MBM Motorsports	Chevrolet
74	Stanton Barrett	Mike Harmon Racing	Chevrolet
78	B. J. McLeod	B. J. McLeod Motorsports	Chevrolet
81	Chandler Smith	Joe Gibbs Racing	Toyota
91	Kyle Weatherman	DGM Racing	Chevrolet
92	Josh Bilicki	DGM Racing	Chevrolet
97	Shane van Gisbergen (R)	Kaulig Racing	Chevrolet
98	Riley Herbst	Stewart–Haas Racing	Ford
Official entry list

== Practice ==
The first and only practice session was held on Friday, February 16, at 4:35 PM EST, and would last for 50 minutes. Jeb Burton, driving for Jordan Anderson Racing, would set the fastest time in the session, with a lap of 48.338, and a speed of 186.189 mph (299.642 km/h).

Pos.	#	Driver	Team	Make	Time	Speed
1	27	Jeb Burton	Jordan Anderson Racing	Chevrolet	48.338	186.189
2	8	Sammy Smith	JR Motorsports	Chevrolet	48.341	186.177
3	18	Sheldon Creed	Joe Gibbs Racing	Toyota	48.349	186.147
Full practice results

== Qualifying ==
Qualifying was held on Saturday, February 17, at 1:30 PM EST. It was originally scheduled to be held at 11:30 AM, but was delayed due to consistent rain showers in the area. Since Daytona International Speedway is a superspeedway, the qualifying system used is a single-car, single-lap system with two rounds. In the first round, drivers have one lap to set a time. The fastest ten drivers from the first round move on to the second round. Whoever sets the fastest time in Round 2 will win the pole.

Because of the delayed start and the threat of more incoming rain, only one round of qualifying was contested. Jesse Love, driving for Richard Childress Racing, would score the pole for the race, with a lap of 49.702, and a speed of 181.079 mph (291.418 km/h).

Six drivers would fail to qualify: Joey Gase, Caesar Bacarella, C. J. McLaughlin, Kyle Sieg, Stanton Barrett, and David Starr. Starr had originally qualified for the race, but his lap time was later disallowed after failing post-qualifying inspection. Dawson Cram, who originally failed to qualify, took over Starr's place in the field.

=== Qualifying results ===
Pos.	#	Driver	Team	Make	Time	Speed
1	2	Jesse Love (R)	Richard Childress Racing	Chevrolet	49.702	181.079
2	21	Austin Hill	Richard Childress Racing	Chevrolet	49.705	181.068
3	16	A. J. Allmendinger	Kaulig Racing	Chevrolet	49.779	180.799
4	48	Parker Kligerman	Big Machine Racing	Chevrolet	49.788	180.766
5	97	Shane van Gisbergen (R)	Kaulig Racing	Chevrolet	49.830	180.614
6	7	Justin Allgaier	JR Motorsports	Chevrolet	49.873	180.458
7	51	Jeremy Clements	Jeremy Clements Racing	Chevrolet	49.921	180.285
8	20	John Hunter Nemechek (i)	Joe Gibbs Racing	Toyota	49.938	180.223
9	31	Parker Retzlaff	Jordan Anderson Racing	Chevrolet	49.963	180.133
10	5	Anthony Alfredo	Our Motorsports	Chevrolet	50.017	179.939
11	98	Riley Herbst	Stewart–Haas Racing	Ford	50.019	179.932
12	8	Sammy Smith	JR Motorsports	Chevrolet	50.032	179.885
13	07	Patrick Emerling	SS-Green Light Racing	Chevrolet	50.035	179.874
14	18	Sheldon Creed	Joe Gibbs Racing	Toyota	50.039	179.860
15	1	Sam Mayer	JR Motorsports	Chevrolet	50.056	179.799
16	27	Jeb Burton	Jordan Anderson Racing	Chevrolet	50.081	179.709
17	00	Cole Custer	Stewart–Haas Racing	Ford	50.087	179.687
18	14	Daniel Suárez (i)	SS-Green Light Racing	Chevrolet	50.094	179.662
19	81	Chandler Smith	Joe Gibbs Racing	Toyota	50.106	179.619
20	19	Ryan Truex	Joe Gibbs Racing	Toyota	50.111	179.601
21	11	Josh Williams	Kaulig Racing	Chevrolet	50.123	179.558
22	9	Brandon Jones	JR Motorsports	Chevrolet	50.124	179.555
23	6	Garrett Smithley	JD Motorsports	Chevrolet	50.124	179.555
24	42	Leland Honeyman (R)	Young's Motorsports	Chevrolet	50.127	179.544
25	91	Kyle Weatherman	DGM Racing	Chevrolet	50.159	179.429
26	10	Daniel Dye (i)	Kaulig Racing	Chevrolet	50.297	178.937
27	92	Josh Bilicki	DGM Racing	Chevrolet	50.367	178.688
28	15	Hailie Deegan (R)	AM Racing	Ford	50.380	178.642
29	32	Jordan Anderson	Jordan Anderson Racing	Chevrolet	50.408	178.543
30	36	Natalie Decker	DGM Racing	Chevrolet	50.418	178.508
31	39	Ryan Sieg	RSS Racing	Ford	50.427	178.476
32	26	Sage Karam	Sam Hunt Racing	Toyota	50.429	178.469
33	44	Brennan Poole	Alpha Prime Racing	Chevrolet	50.440	178.430
Qualified by owner's points
34	29	Blaine Perkins	RSS Racing	Ford	50.552	178.034
35	4	Dawson Cram (R)	JD Motorsports	Chevrolet	50.685	177.567
36	43	Ryan Ellis	Alpha Prime Racing	Chevrolet	50.835	177.043
37	35	Frankie Muniz	Joey Gase Motorsports	Ford	50.907	176.793
38	78	B. J. McLeod	B. J. McLeod Motorsports	Chevrolet	50.937	176.689
Failed to qualify
39	53	Joey Gase	Joey Gase Motorsports	Chevrolet	50.486	178.267
40	45	Caesar Bacarella	Alpha Prime Racing	Chevrolet	50.623	177.785
41	38	C. J. McLaughlin	RSS Racing	Ford	50.738	177.382
42	28	Kyle Sieg	RSS Racing	Ford	50.892	176.845
43	74	Stanton Barrett	Mike Harmon Racing	Chevrolet	51.539	174.625
44	66	David Starr	MBM Motorsports	Chevrolet	–	–
Official qualifying results
Official starting lineup

== Race results ==
Stage 1 Laps: 30

Pos.	#	Driver	Team	Make	Pts
1	2	Jesse Love (R)	Richard Childress Racing	Chevrolet	10
2	21	Austin Hill	Richard Childress Racing	Chevrolet	9
3	48	Parker Kligerman	Big Machine Racing	Chevrolet	8
4	5	Anthony Alfredo	Our Motorsports	Chevrolet	7
5	27	Jeb Burton	Jordan Anderson Racing	Chevrolet	6
6	18	Sheldon Creed	Joe Gibbs Racing	Toyota	5
7	20	John Hunter Nemechek (i)	Joe Gibbs Racing	Toyota	0
8	16	A. J. Allmendinger	Kaulig Racing	Chevrolet	3
9	7	Justin Allgaier	JR Motorsports	Chevrolet	2
10	19	Ryan Truex	Joe Gibbs Racing	Toyota	1

Stage 2 Laps: 30

Pos.	#	Driver	Team	Make	Pts
1	21	Austin Hill	Richard Childress Racing	Chevrolet	10
2	8	Sammy Smith	JR Motorsports	Chevrolet	9
3	18	Sheldon Creed	Joe Gibbs Racing	Toyota	8
4	00	Cole Custer	Stewart–Haas Racing	Ford	7
5	39	Ryan Sieg	RSS Racing	Ford	6
6	19	Ryan Truex	Joe Gibbs Racing	Toyota	5
7	98	Riley Herbst	Stewart–Haas Racing	Ford	4
8	7	Justin Allgaier	JR Motorsports	Chevrolet	3
9	16	A. J. Allmendinger	Kaulig Racing	Chevrolet	2
10	9	Brandon Jones	JR Motorsports	Chevrolet	1

Stage 3 Laps: 60

Fin	St	#	Driver	Team	Make	Laps	Led	Status	Pts
1	2	21	Austin Hill	Richard Childress Racing	Chevrolet	120	9	Running	59
2	14	18	Sheldon Creed	Joe Gibbs Racing	Toyota	120	2	Running	48
3	9	31	Parker Retzlaff	Jordan Anderson Racing	Chevrolet	120	0	Running	34
4	29	32	Jordan Anderson	Jordan Anderson Racing	Chevrolet	120	6	Running	33
5	19	81	Chandler Smith	Joe Gibbs Racing	Toyota	120	1	Running	32
6	11	98	Riley Herbst	Stewart–Haas Racing	Ford	120	8	Running	35
7	8	20	John Hunter Nemechek (i)	Joe Gibbs Racing	Toyota	120	0	Running	0
8	6	7	Justin Allgaier	JR Motorsports	Chevrolet	120	7	Running	34
9	22	9	Brandon Jones	JR Motorsports	Chevrolet	120	0	Running	29
10	3	16	A. J. Allmendinger	Kaulig Racing	Chevrolet	120	3	Running	32
11	36	43	Ryan Ellis	Alpha Prime Racing	Chevrolet	120	11	Running	26
12	5	97	Shane van Gisbergen (R)	Kaulig Racing	Chevrolet	120	0	Running	25
13	17	00	Cole Custer	Stewart–Haas Racing	Ford	120	6	Running	31
14	34	29	Blaine Perkins	RSS Racing	Ford	120	0	Running	23
15	38	78	B. J. McLeod	B. J. McLeod Motorsports	Chevrolet	120	0	Running	22
16	23	6	Garrett Smithley	JD Motorsports	Chevrolet	120	0	Running	21
17	13	07	Patrick Emerling	SS-Green Light Racing	Chevrolet	120	0	Running	20
18	30	36	Natalie Decker	DGM Racing	Chevrolet	120	7	Running	19
19	33	44	Brennan Poole	Alpha Prime Racing	Chevrolet	120	0	Running	18
20	1	2	Jesse Love (R)	Richard Childress Racing	Chevrolet	120	34	Running	27
21	20	19	Ryan Truex	Joe Gibbs Racing	Toyota	120	0	Running	22
22	31	39	Ryan Sieg	RSS Racing	Ford	120	12	Running	21
23	12	8	Sammy Smith	JR Motorsports	Chevrolet	119	6	Running	23
24	10	5	Anthony Alfredo	Our Motorsports	Chevrolet	118	0	Running	20
25	4	48	Parker Kligerman	Big Machine Racing	Chevrolet	118	0	Running	20
26	16	27	Jeb Burton	Jordan Anderson Racing	Chevrolet	118	8	Running	17
27	26	10	Daniel Dye (i)	Kaulig Racing	Chevrolet	117	0	Running	0
28	32	26	Sage Karam	Sam Hunt Racing	Toyota	111	0	Accident	9
29	7	51	Jeremy Clements	Jeremy Clements Racing	Chevrolet	109	0	DVP	8
30	24	42	Leland Honeyman (R)	Young's Motorsports	Chevrolet	102	0	Accident	7
31	35	4	Dawson Cram (R)	JD Motorsports	Chevrolet	51	0	Accident	6
32	27	92	Josh Bilicki	DGM Racing	Chevrolet	51	0	Accident	5
33	37	35	Frankie Muniz	Joey Gase Motorsports	Ford	37	0	DVP	4
34	21	11	Josh Williams	Kaulig Racing	Chevrolet	37	0	DVP	3
35	18	14	Daniel Suárez (i)	SS-Green Light Racing	Chevrolet	23	0	Accident	0
36	15	1	Sam Mayer	JR Motorsports	Chevrolet	22	0	Accident	1
37	28	15	Hailie Deegan (R)	AM Racing	Ford	22	0	Accident	1
38	25	91	Kyle Weatherman	DGM Racing	Chevrolet	22	0	Accident	1
Official race results

== Standings after the race ==
Drivers' Championship standings

Pos	Driver	Points
1	Austin Hill	59
2	Sheldon Creed	48 (-11)
3	Riley Herbst	35 (–24)
4	Parker Retzlaff	34 (–25)
5	Justin Allgaier	34 (–25)
6	Jordan Anderson	33 (–26)
7	Chandler Smith	32 (–27)
8	A. J. Allmendinger	32 (–27)
9	Cole Custer	31 (–28)
10	Brandon Jones	29 (–30)
11	Jesse Love	27 (–32)
12	Ryan Ellis	26 (–33)
Official driver's standings

Manufacturers' Championship standings

Pos	Manufacturer	Points
1	Chevrolet	40
2	Toyota	35 (–5)
3	Ford	31 (–9)

- Note: Only the first 12 positions are included for the driver standings.

Previous race: 2023 NASCAR Xfinity Series Championship Race	NASCAR Xfinity Series; 2024 season	Next race: 2024 Raptor King of Tough 250
