= 2025 Food City 500 =

Race details
- Race 9 of 36 in the 2025 NASCAR Cup Series
- Date: April 13, 2025
- Location: Bristol Motor Speedway in Bristol, Tennessee
- Course: Permanent racing facility
- Course length: 0.533 miles (0.858 km)
- Distance: 500 laps, 266.5 mi (429 km)
- Average speed: 100.746 miles per hour (162.135 km/h)

Pole position
| Driver | Alex Bowman | Hendrick Motorsports |
- Time: 14.912

Most laps led
| Driver | Kyle Larson | Hendrick Motorsports |
- Laps: 411

Fastest lap
| Driver | A. J. Allmendinger | Kaulig Racing |
- Time: 15.380

Winner
| No. 5 | Kyle Larson | Hendrick Motorsports |

Television in the United States
- Network: FS1
- Announcers: Mike Joy, Clint Bowyer, and Kevin Harvick
- Nielsen ratings: 2.054 million

Radio in the United States
- Radio: PRN
- Booth announcers: Brad Gillie and Mark Garrow
- Turn announcers: Rob Albright (Backstretch)

The 2025 Food City 500 was a NASCAR Cup Series race that was held on April 13, 2025, at Bristol Motor Speedway in Bristol, Tennessee. Contested over 500 laps on the 0.533 miles (0.858 km) short track, it was the 9th race of the 2025 NASCAR Cup Series season.

Kyle Larson won the race. Denny Hamlin finished 2nd, and Ty Gibbs finished 3rd. Chase Briscoe and Ryan Blaney rounded out the top five, and William Byron, Ross Chastain, Christopher Bell, A. J. Allmendinger, and Austin Dillon rounded out the top ten.

== Report ==
=== Background ===
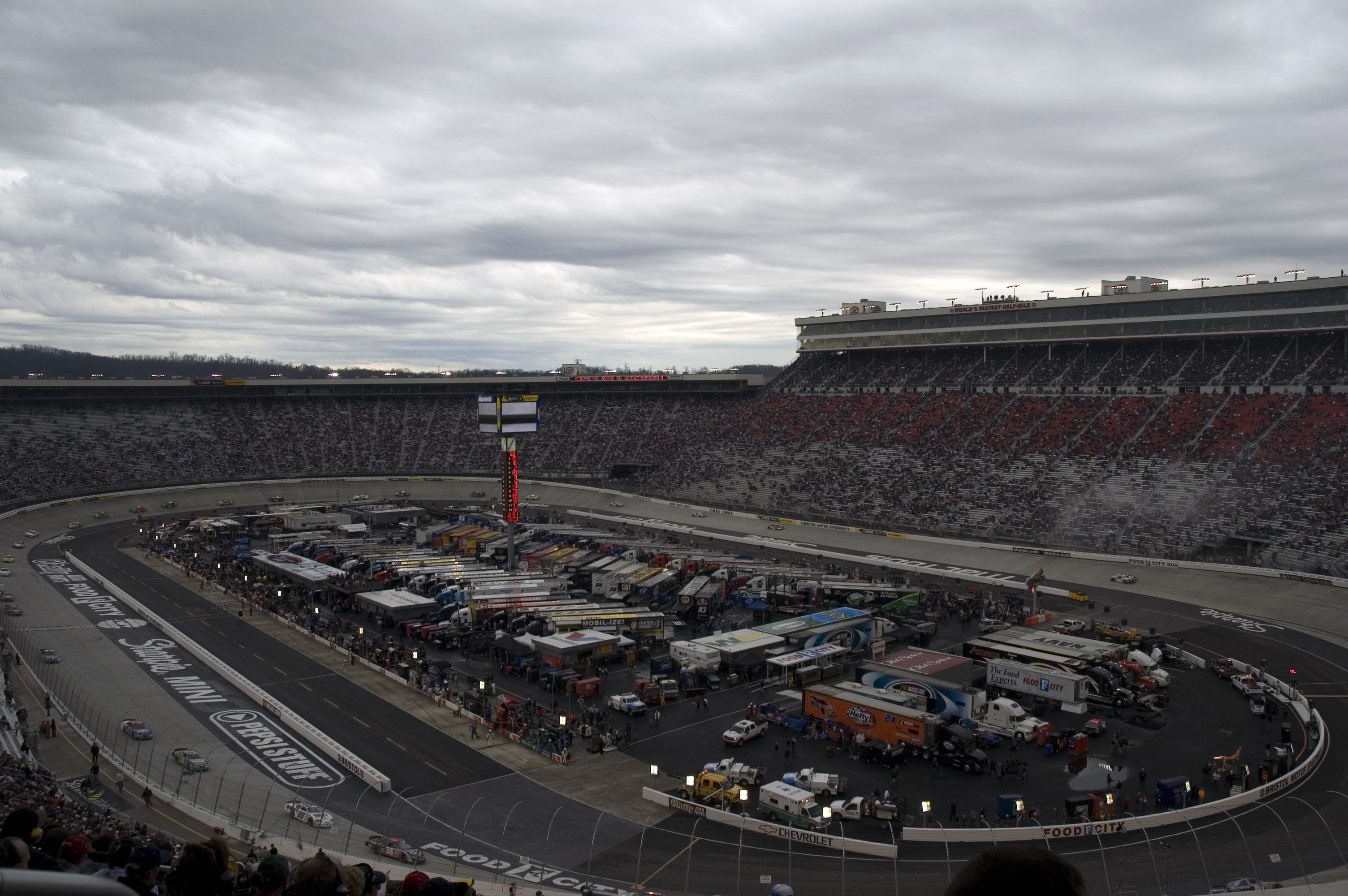
Bristol Motor Speedway, the track where the race was held.

Bristol Motor Speedway, formerly known as Bristol International Raceway and Bristol Raceway, is a NASCAR short track venue located in Bristol, Tennessee. Constructed in 1960, it held its first NASCAR race on July 30, 1961. Bristol is among the most popular tracks on the NASCAR schedule because of its distinct features, which include extraordinarily steep banking combined with short length, an all concrete surface, two pit roads, and stadium-like seating.

In 2021, the race shifted to a dirt surface version of the track and was renamed the Food City Dirt Race. After the 2023 event, the race would return to being run on concrete to replace the dirt surface.

==== Entry list ====
- (R) denotes rookie driver.
- (i) denotes driver who is ineligible for series driver points.

| No. | Driver | Team | Manufacturer |
|---|---|---|---|
| 01 | Corey LaJoie | Rick Ware Racing | Ford |
| 1 | Ross Chastain | Trackhouse Racing | Chevrolet |
| 2 | Austin Cindric | Team Penske | Ford |
| 3 | Austin Dillon | Richard Childress Racing | Chevrolet |
| 4 | Noah Gragson | Front Row Motorsports | Ford |
| 5 | Kyle Larson | Hendrick Motorsports | Chevrolet |
| 6 | Brad Keselowski | RFK Racing | Ford |
| 7 | Justin Haley | Spire Motorsports | Chevrolet |
| 8 | Kyle Busch | Richard Childress Racing | Chevrolet |
| 9 | Chase Elliott | Hendrick Motorsports | Chevrolet |
| 10 | Ty Dillon | Kaulig Racing | Chevrolet |
| 11 | Denny Hamlin | Joe Gibbs Racing | Toyota |
| 12 | Ryan Blaney | Team Penske | Ford |
| 16 | A. J. Allmendinger | Kaulig Racing | Chevrolet |
| 17 | Chris Buescher | RFK Racing | Ford |
| 19 | Chase Briscoe | Joe Gibbs Racing | Toyota |
| 20 | Christopher Bell | Joe Gibbs Racing | Toyota |
| 21 | Josh Berry | Wood Brothers Racing | Ford |
| 22 | Joey Logano | Team Penske | Ford |
| 23 | Bubba Wallace | 23XI Racing | Toyota |
| 24 | William Byron | Hendrick Motorsports | Chevrolet |
| 33 | Jesse Love (i) | Richard Childress Racing | Chevrolet |
| 34 | Todd Gilliland | Front Row Motorsports | Ford |
| 35 | Riley Herbst (R) | 23XI Racing | Toyota |
| 38 | Zane Smith | Front Row Motorsports | Ford |
| 41 | Cole Custer | Haas Factory Team | Ford |
| 42 | John Hunter Nemechek | Legacy Motor Club | Toyota |
| 43 | Erik Jones | Legacy Motor Club | Toyota |
| 45 | Tyler Reddick | 23XI Racing | Toyota |
| 47 | Ricky Stenhouse Jr. | Hyak Motorsports | Chevrolet |
| 48 | Alex Bowman | Hendrick Motorsports | Chevrolet |
| 51 | Cody Ware | Rick Ware Racing | Ford |
| 54 | Ty Gibbs | Joe Gibbs Racing | Toyota |
| 60 | Ryan Preece | RFK Racing | Ford |
| 66 | Josh Bilicki (i) | Garage 66 | Ford |
| 71 | Michael McDowell | Spire Motorsports | Chevrolet |
| 77 | Carson Hocevar | Spire Motorsports | Chevrolet |
| 88 | Shane van Gisbergen (R) | Trackhouse Racing | Chevrolet |
| 99 | Daniel Suárez | Trackhouse Racing | Chevrolet |
Official entry list

== Practice ==
Ricky Stenhouse Jr. was the fastest in the practice session with a time of 14.981 seconds and a speed of 128.082 mph (206.128 km/h).

=== Practice results ===
| Pos | No. | Driver | Team | Manufacturer | Time | Speed |
|---|---|---|---|---|---|---|
| 1 | 47 | Ricky Stenhouse Jr. | Hyak Motorsports | Chevrolet | 14.981 | 128.082 |
| 2 | 12 | Ryan Blaney | Team Penske | Ford | 15.041 | 127.571 |
| 3 | 2 | Austin Cindric | Team Penske | Ford | 15.092 | 127.140 |
Official practice results

== Qualifying ==
Alex Bowman scored the pole for the race with a time of 14.912 and a speed of 128.675 mph (207.082 km/h).

=== Qualifying results ===
| Pos | No. | Driver | Team | Manufacturer | Time | Speed |
|---|---|---|---|---|---|---|
| 1 | 48 | Alex Bowman | Hendrick Motorsports | Chevrolet | 14.912 | 128.675 |
| 2 | 47 | Ricky Stenhouse Jr. | Hyak Motorsports | Chevrolet | 14.925 | 128.563 |
| 3 | 5 | Kyle Larson | Hendrick Motorsports | Chevrolet | 14.931 | 128.511 |
| 4 | 11 | Denny Hamlin | Joe Gibbs Racing | Toyota | 14.937 | 128.460 |
| 5 | 12 | Ryan Blaney | Team Penske | Ford | 14.955 | 128.305 |
| 6 | 54 | Ty Gibbs | Joe Gibbs Racing | Toyota | 14.964 | 128.288 |
| 7 | 20 | Christopher Bell | Joe Gibbs Racing | Toyota | 14.969 | 128.185 |
| 8 | 16 | A. J. Allmendinger | Kaulig Racing | Chevrolet | 15.002 | 127.903 |
| 9 | 77 | Carson Hocevar | Spire Motorsports | Chevrolet | 15.019 | 127.758 |
| 10 | 7 | Justin Haley | Spire Motorsports | Chevrolet | 15.030 | 127.665 |
| 11 | 21 | Josh Berry | Wood Brothers Racing | Ford | 15.058 | 127.427 |
| 12 | 10 | Ty Dillon | Kaulig Racing | Chevrolet | 15.074 | 127.292 |
| 13 | 71 | Michael McDowell | Spire Motorsports | Chevrolet | 15.075 | 127.284 |
| 14 | 19 | Chase Briscoe | Joe Gibbs Racing | Toyota | 15.088 | 127.174 |
| 15 | 8 | Kyle Busch | Richard Childress Racing | Chevrolet | 15.097 | 127.098 |
| 16 | 6 | Brad Keselowski | RFK Racing | Ford | 15.098 | 127.090 |
| 17 | 3 | Austin Dillon | Richard Childress Racing | Chevrolet | 15.099 | 127.081 |
| 18 | 38 | Zane Smith | Front Row Motorsports | Ford | 15.130 | 126.821 |
| 19 | 33 | Jesse Love (i) | Richard Childress Racing | Chevrolet | 15.137 | 126.762 |
| 20 | 9 | Chase Elliott | Hendrick Motorsports | Chevrolet | 15.138 | 126.754 |
| 21 | 2 | Austin Cindric | Team Penske | Ford | 15.149 | 126.662 |
| 22 | 23 | Bubba Wallace | 23XI Racing | Toyota | 15.193 | 126.295 |
| 23 | 99 | Daniel Suárez | Trackhouse Racing | Chevrolet | 15.204 | 126.204 |
| 24 | 17 | Chris Buescher | RFK Racing | Ford | 15.246 | 125.856 |
| 25 | 35 | Riley Herbst (R) | 23XI Racing | Toyota | 15.247 | 125.848 |
| 26 | 24 | William Byron | Hendrick Motorsports | Chevrolet | 15.263 | 125.716 |
| 27 | 45 | Tyler Reddick | 23XI Racing | Toyota | 15.268 | 125.675 |
| 28 | 43 | Erik Jones | Legacy Motor Club | Toyota | 15.274 | 125.625 |
| 29 | 60 | Ryan Preece | RFK Racing | Ford | 15.290 | 125.494 |
| 30 | 34 | Todd Gilliland | Front Row Motorsports | Ford | 15.297 | 125.436 |
| 31 | 4 | Noah Gragson | Front Row Motorsports | Ford | 15.301 | 125.404 |
| 32 | 42 | John Hunter Nemechek | Legacy Motor Club | Toyota | 15.304 | 125.379 |
| 33 | 41 | Cole Custer | Haas Factory Team | Ford | 15.322 | 125.232 |
| 34 | 51 | Cody Ware | Rick Ware Racing | Ford | 15.441 | 124.267 |
| 35 | 1 | Ross Chastain | Trackhouse Racing | Chevrolet | 15.448 | 124.210 |
| 36 | 88 | Shane van Gisbergen (R) | Trackhouse Racing | Chevrolet | 15.569 | 123.245 |
| 37 | 01 | Corey LaJoie | Rick Ware Racing | Ford | 15.641 | 122.678 |
| 38 | 22 | Joey Logano | Team Penske | Ford | 16.275 | 117.899 |
| 39 | 66 | Josh Bilicki (i) | Garage 66 | Ford | 16.348 | 117.372 |
Official qualifying results

== Race ==
=== Race results ===
==== Stage Results ====
Stage One Laps: 125

| Pos | No | Driver | Team | Manufacturer | Points |
|---|---|---|---|---|---|
| 1 | 5 | Kyle Larson | Hendrick Motorsports | Chevrolet | 10 |
| 2 | 11 | Denny Hamlin | Joe Gibbs Racing | Toyota | 9 |
| 3 | 7 | Justin Haley | Spire Motorsports | Chevrolet | 8 |
| 4 | 48 | Alex Bowman | Hendrick Motorsports | Chevrolet | 7 |
| 5 | 77 | Carson Hocevar | Spire Motorsports | Chevrolet | 6 |
| 6 | 20 | Christopher Bell | Joe Gibbs Racing | Toyota | 5 |
| 7 | 12 | Ryan Blaney | Team Penske | Ford | 4 |
| 8 | 47 | Ricky Stenhouse Jr. | Hyak Motorsports | Chevrolet | 3 |
| 9 | 54 | Ty Gibbs | Joe Gibbs Racing | Toyota | 2 |
| 10 | 16 | A. J. Allmendinger | Kaulig Racing | Chevrolet | 1 |
Official stage one results

Stage Two Laps: 125

| Pos | No | Driver | Team | Manufacturer | Points |
|---|---|---|---|---|---|
| 1 | 5 | Kyle Larson | Hendrick Motorsports | Chevrolet | 10 |
| 2 | 48 | Alex Bowman | Hendrick Motorsports | Chevrolet | 9 |
| 3 | 20 | Christopher Bell | Joe Gibbs Racing | Toyota | 8 |
| 4 | 77 | Carson Hocevar | Spire Motorsports | Chevrolet | 7 |
| 5 | 11 | Denny Hamlin | Joe Gibbs Racing | Toyota | 6 |
| 6 | 7 | Justin Haley | Spire Motorsports | Chevrolet | 5 |
| 7 | 54 | Ty Gibbs | Joe Gibbs Racing | Toyota | 4 |
| 8 | 12 | Ryan Blaney | Team Penske | Ford | 3 |
| 9 | 19 | Chase Briscoe | Joe Gibbs Racing | Toyota | 2 |
| 10 | 45 | Tyler Reddick | 23XI Racing | Toyota | 1 |
Official stage two results

=== Final Stage Results ===
Stage Three Laps: 250

| Pos | Grid | No | Driver | Team | Manufacturer | Laps | Points |
|---|---|---|---|---|---|---|---|
| 1 | 3 | 5 | Kyle Larson | Hendrick Motorsports | Chevrolet | 500 | 60 |
| 2 | 4 | 11 | Denny Hamlin | Joe Gibbs Racing | Toyota | 500 | 50 |
| 3 | 6 | 54 | Ty Gibbs | Joe Gibbs Racing | Toyota | 500 | 39 |
| 4 | 14 | 19 | Chase Briscoe | Joe Gibbs Racing | Toyota | 500 | 35 |
| 5 | 5 | 12 | Ryan Blaney | Team Penske | Ford | 500 | 38 |
| 6 | 26 | 24 | William Byron | Hendrick Motorsports | Chevrolet | 500 | 31 |
| 7 | 35 | 1 | Ross Chastain | Trackhouse Racing | Chevrolet | 500 | 30 |
| 8 | 7 | 20 | Christopher Bell | Joe Gibbs Racing | Toyota | 500 | 41 |
| 9 | 8 | 16 | A. J. Allmendinger | Kaulig Racing | Chevrolet | 500 | 30 |
| 10 | 17 | 3 | Austin Dillon | Richard Childress Racing | Chevrolet | 499 | 27 |
| 11 | 9 | 77 | Carson Hocevar | Spire Motorsports | Chevrolet | 499 | 38 |
| 12 | 11 | 21 | Josh Berry | Wood Brothers Racing | Ford | 499 | 25 |
| 13 | 10 | 7 | Justin Haley | Spire Motorsports | Chevrolet | 499 | 37 |
| 14 | 15 | 8 | Kyle Busch | Richard Childress Racing | Chevrolet | 499 | 23 |
| 15 | 20 | 9 | Chase Elliott | Hendrick Motorsports | Chevrolet | 499 | 22 |
| 16 | 16 | 6 | Brad Keselowski | RFK Racing | Ford | 498 | 21 |
| 17 | 21 | 2 | Austin Cindric | Team Penske | Ford | 498 | 20 |
| 18 | 27 | 45 | Tyler Reddick | 23XI Racing | Toyota | 498 | 20 |
| 19 | 22 | 23 | Bubba Wallace | 23XI Racing | Toyota | 498 | 18 |
| 20 | 29 | 60 | Ryan Preece | RFK Racing | Ford | 498 | 17 |
| 21 | 32 | 42 | John Hunter Nemechek | Legacy Motor Club | Toyota | 498 | 16 |
| 22 | 2 | 47 | Ricky Stenhouse Jr. | Hyak Motorsports | Chevrolet | 498 | 18 |
| 23 | 31 | 4 | Noah Gragson | Front Row Motorsports | Ford | 498 | 14 |
| 24 | 38 | 22 | Joey Logano | Team Penske | Ford | 497 | 13 |
| 25 | 24 | 17 | Chris Buescher | RFK Racing | Ford | 497 | 12 |
| 26 | 28 | 43 | Erik Jones | Legacy Motor Club | Toyota | 497 | 11 |
| 27 | 18 | 38 | Zane Smith | Front Row Motorsports | Ford | 497 | 10 |
| 28 | 25 | 35 | Riley Herbst (R) | 23XI Racing | Toyota | 496 | 9 |
| 29 | 33 | 41 | Cole Custer | Haas Factory Team | Ford | 495 | 8 |
| 30 | 13 | 71 | Michael McDowell | Spire Motorsports | Chevrolet | 495 | 7 |
| 31 | 19 | 33 | Jesse Love (i) | Richard Childress Racing | Chevrolet | 495 | 0 |
| 32 | 12 | 10 | Ty Dillon | Kaulig Racing | Chevrolet | 494 | 5 |
| 33 | 23 | 99 | Daniel Suárez | Trackhouse Racing | Chevrolet | 494 | 4 |
| 34 | 37 | 01 | Corey LaJoie | Rick Ware Racing | Ford | 494 | 3 |
| 35 | 30 | 34 | Todd Gilliland | Front Row Motorsports | Ford | 493 | 2 |
| 36 | 34 | 51 | Cody Ware | Rick Ware Racing | Ford | 493 | 1 |
| 37 | 1 | 48 | Alex Bowman | Hendrick Motorsports | Chevrolet | 343 | 17 |
| 38 | 36 | 88 | Shane van Gisbergen (R) | Trackhouse Racing | Chevrolet | 208 | 1 |
| 39 | 39 | 66 | Josh Bilicki (i) | Garage 66 | Ford | 193 | 0 |
Official race results

=== Race statistics ===
- Lead changes: 4 among 4 different drivers
- Cautions/Laps: 3 for 40
- Red flags: 0
- Time of race: 2 hours, 38 minutes and 43 seconds
- Average speed: 100.746 miles per hour (162.135 km/h)

== Media ==
=== Television ===
The race was carried by FS1 in the United States. Mike Joy, Clint Bowyer, and three-time Bristol winner Kevin Harvick called the race from the broadcast booth. Jamie Little and Regan Smith handled pit road for the television side, and Larry McReynolds provided insight on-site during the race.

FS1
| Booth announcers | Pit reporters | In-race analyst |
|---|---|---|
| Lap-by-lap: Mike Joy; Color-commentator: Clint Bowyer; Color-commentator: Kevin Harvick | Jamie Little; Regan Smith | Larry McReynolds |

=== Radio ===
PRN covered the radio call for the race which was simulcasted on Sirius XM NASCAR Radio. Brad Gillie and Mark Garrow called the race in the booth when the field raced down the frontstretch. Rob Albright called the race from atop the turn 3 suites when the field raced down the backstretch. Andrew Kurland, Doug Turnbull, Alan Cavanna and Wendy Venturini covered the action on pit lane for PRN.

PRN
| Booth announcers | Turn announcers | Pit reporters |
|---|---|---|
| Lead announcer: Brad Gillie; Announcer: Mark Garrow | Backstretch: Rob Albright | Andrew Kurland; Doug Turnbull; Alan Cavanna; Wendy Venturini |

== Standings after the race ==
Drivers' Championship standings

| | Pos | Driver | Points |
|---|---|---|---|
| | 1 | William Byron | 346 |
| | 2 | Denny Hamlin | 316 (–30) |
| | 3 | Christopher Bell | 305 (–41) |
| 2 | 4 | Kyle Larson | 304 (–42) |
| 1 | 5 | Chase Elliott | 278 (–68) |
| 1 | 6 | Ryan Blaney | 275 (–71) |
| 2 | 7 | Tyler Reddick | 274 (–72) |
| | 8 | Bubba Wallace | 251 (–95) |
| | 9 | Joey Logano | 245 (–101) |
| | 10 | Alex Bowman | 244 (–102) |
| 1 | 11 | Ross Chastain | 229 (–117) |
| 1 | 12 | Chris Buescher | 227 (–119) |
| 1 | 13 | Chase Briscoe | 213 (–133) |
| 1 | 14 | Ryan Preece | 201 (–145) |
| | 15 | Kyle Busch | 200 (–146) |
| | 16 | A. J. Allmendinger | 198 (–148) |
Official driver's standings

Manufacturers' Championship standings

| Pos | Manufacturer | Points |
|---|---|---|
| 1 | Toyota | 329 |
| 2 | Chevrolet | 327 (–2) |
| 3 | Ford | 291 (–38) |

- Note: Only the first 16 positions are included for the driver standings.

| Previous race: 2025 Goodyear 400 | NASCAR Cup Series; 2025 season | Next race: 2025 Jack Link's 500 |
