= 2024 Raptor King of Tough 250 =

2nd race of the 2024 NASCAR Xfinity Series

Race details
- Race 2 of 33 of the 2024 NASCAR Xfinity Series
- Date: February 24, 2024
- Official name: 33rd Annual Raptor King of Tough 250
- Location: Atlanta Motor Speedway in Hampton, Georgia
- Course: Permanent racing facility
- Course length: 1.54 miles (2.48 km)
- Distance: 169 laps, 260 mi (418 km)
- Scheduled distance: 163 laps, 251 mi (404 km)
- Average speed: 135.474 mph (218.024 km/h)

Pole position
Driver	Jesse Love	Richard Childress Racing
- Time: 31.874

Most laps led
Driver	Jesse Love	Richard Childress Racing
- Laps: 157

Winner
No. 21	Austin Hill	Richard Childress Racing

Television in the United States
- Network: FS1
- Announcers: Adam Alexander, Brad Keselowski, and Joey Logano

Radio in the United States
- Radio: PRN

The 2024 Raptor King of Tough 250 was the 2nd stock car race of the 2024 NASCAR Xfinity Series, and the 33rd iteration of the event. The race was held on Saturday, February 24, 2024, at Atlanta Motor Speedway in Hampton, Georgia, a 1.54 miles (2.48 km) permanent asphalt quad-oval shaped intermediate speedway (with superspeedway rules). The race was originally scheduled to be contested over 163 laps, but was increased to 169 laps due to a NASCAR overtime finish. Austin Hill, driving for Richard Childress Racing, took advantage of the lead on the final restart with two laps to go, and was able to stretch his fuel mileage to earn his 8th career NASCAR Xfinity Series win, his second of the season, and his second consecutive win. Hill's teammate, Jesse Love, was the most dominant driver of the race, winning both stages and leading a race-high 157 laps, before his car sputtered on the final restart. To fill out the podium, Chandler Smith, driving for Joe Gibbs Racing, and Shane van Gisbergen, driving for Kaulig Racing, would finish 2nd and 3rd, respectively.

== Report ==
=== Background ===
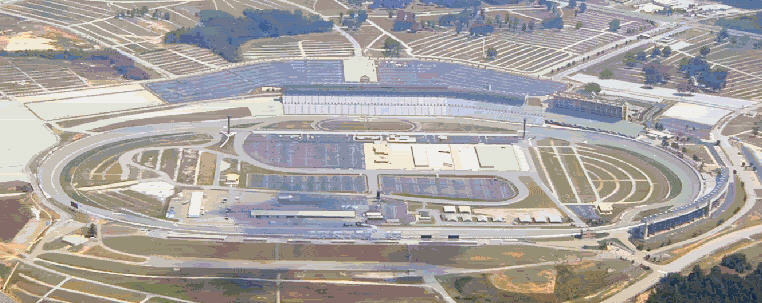
Atlanta Motor Speedway, the circuit where the race will be held.

Atlanta Motor Speedway is a 1.54-mile race track in Hampton, Georgia, United States, 20 miles (32 km) south of Atlanta. It has annually hosted NASCAR Xfinity Series stock car races since 1992.

The venue was bought by Speedway Motorsports in 1990. In 1994, 46 condominiums were built over the northeastern side of the track. In 1997, to standardize the track with Speedway Motorsports' other two intermediate ovals, the entire track was almost completely rebuilt. The frontstretch and backstretch were swapped, and the configuration of the track was changed from oval to quad-oval, with a new official length of 1.54-mile (2.48 km) where before it was 1.522-mile (2.449 km). The project made the track one of the fastest on the NASCAR circuit. In July 2021 NASCAR announced that the track would be reprofiled for the 2022 season to have 28 degrees of banking and would be narrowed from 55 to 40 feet which the track claims will turn racing at the track similar to restrictor plate superspeedways. Despite the reprofiling being criticized by drivers, construction began in August 2021 and wrapped up in December 2021. The track has seating capacity of 71,000 to 125,000 people depending on the tracks configuration.

==== Entry list ====
- (R) denotes rookie driver.
- (i) denotes driver who is ineligible for series driver points.

#	Driver	Team	Make
00	Cole Custer	Stewart–Haas Racing	Ford
1	Sam Mayer	JR Motorsports	Chevrolet
2	Jesse Love (R)	Richard Childress Racing	Chevrolet
4	Dawson Cram (R)	JD Motorsports	Chevrolet
5	Anthony Alfredo	Our Motorsports	Chevrolet
6	Garrett Smithley	JD Motorsports	Chevrolet
07	Patrick Emerling	SS-Green Light Racing	Chevrolet
7	Justin Allgaier	JR Motorsports	Chevrolet
8	Sammy Smith	JR Motorsports	Chevrolet
9	Brandon Jones	JR Motorsports	Chevrolet
11	Josh Williams	Kaulig Racing	Chevrolet
14	J. J. Yeley	SS-Green Light Racing	Chevrolet
15	Hailie Deegan (R)	AM Racing	Ford
16	A. J. Allmendinger	Kaulig Racing	Chevrolet
18	Sheldon Creed	Joe Gibbs Racing	Toyota
19	Ryan Truex	Joe Gibbs Racing	Toyota
20	John Hunter Nemechek (i)	Joe Gibbs Racing	Toyota
21	Austin Hill	Richard Childress Racing	Chevrolet
26	Jeffrey Earnhardt	Sam Hunt Racing	Toyota
27	Jeb Burton	Jordan Anderson Racing	Chevrolet
28	Kyle Sieg	RSS Racing	Ford
29	Blaine Perkins	RSS Racing	Ford
31	Parker Retzlaff	Jordan Anderson Racing	Chevrolet
32	Jordan Anderson	Jordan Anderson Racing	Chevrolet
35	Joey Gase	Joey Gase Motorsports	Chevrolet
38	C. J. McLaughlin	RSS Racing	Ford
39	Ryan Sieg	RSS Racing	Ford
42	Leland Honeyman (R)	Young's Motorsports	Chevrolet
43	Ryan Ellis	Alpha Prime Racing	Chevrolet
44	Brennan Poole	Alpha Prime Racing	Chevrolet
48	Parker Kligerman	Big Machine Racing	Chevrolet
51	Jeremy Clements	Jeremy Clements Racing	Chevrolet
78	B. J. McLeod	B. J. McLeod Motorsports	Chevrolet
81	Chandler Smith	Joe Gibbs Racing	Toyota
91	Kyle Weatherman	DGM Racing	Chevrolet
92	Nick Leitz	DGM Racing	Chevrolet
97	Shane van Gisbergen (R)	Kaulig Racing	Chevrolet
98	Riley Herbst	Stewart–Haas Racing	Ford
Official entry list

== Qualifying ==
Qualifying was held on Friday, February 23, at 5:00 PM EST. Since Atlanta Motor Speedway is an intermediate speedway with superspeedway rules, the qualifying system used is a single-car, single-lap system with two rounds. In the first round, drivers have one lap to set a time. The fastest ten drivers from the first round move on to the second round. Whoever sets the fastest time in Round 2 will win the pole.

Jesse Love, driving for Richard Childress Racing, would advance from the preliminary round and set the fastest time in Round 2, with a lap of 31.874, and a speed of 173.935 mph (279.921 km/h). He became the first driver in series history to earn two consecutive poles in his first two starts.

No drivers would fail to qualify.

=== Qualifying results ===
Pos.	#	Driver	Team	Make	Time (R1)	Speed (R1)	Time (R2)	Speed (R2)
1	2	Jesse Love (R)	Richard Childress Racing	Chevrolet	31.948	173.532	31.874	173.935
2	21	Austin Hill	Richard Childress Racing	Chevrolet	32.065	172.899	31.916	173.706
3	20	John Hunter Nemechek (i)	Joe Gibbs Racing	Toyota	32.086	172.786	31.947	173.537
4	98	Riley Herbst	Stewart–Haas Racing	Ford	32.168	172.345	31.999	173.255
5	48	Parker Kligerman	Big Machine Racing	Chevrolet	32.151	172.436	32.022	173.131
6	1	Sam Mayer	JR Motorsports	Chevrolet	32.251	171.902	32.028	173.099
7	16	A. J. Allmendinger	Kaulig Racing	Chevrolet	32.072	172.861	32.035	173.061
8	19	Ryan Truex	Joe Gibbs Racing	Toyota	32.213	172.104	32.079	172.823
9	7	Justin Allgaier	JR Motorsports	Chevrolet	32.128	172.560	32.115	172.630
10	18	Sheldon Creed	Joe Gibbs Racing	Toyota	32.254	171.886	32.141	172.490
Eliminated in Round 1
11	00	Cole Custer	Stewart–Haas Racing	Ford	32.258	171.864	—	—
12	81	Chandler Smith	Joe Gibbs Racing	Toyota	32.294	171.673	—	—
13	97	Shane van Gisbergen (R)	Kaulig Racing	Chevrolet	32.337	171.444	—	—
14	8	Sammy Smith	JR Motorsports	Chevrolet	32.340	171.429	—	—
15	5	Anthony Alfredo	Our Motorsports	Chevrolet	32.414	171.037	—	—
16	11	Josh Williams	Kaulig Racing	Chevrolet	32.430	170.953	—	—
17	91	Kyle Weatherman	DGM Racing	Chevrolet	32.448	170.858	—	—
18	9	Brandon Jones	JR Motorsports	Chevrolet	32.458	170.805	—	—
19	15	Hailie Deegan (R)	AM Racing	Ford	32.477	170.705	—	—
20	39	Ryan Sieg	RSS Racing	Ford	32.531	170.422	—	—
21	78	B. J. McLeod	B. J. McLeod Motorsports	Chevrolet	32.676	169.666	—	—
22	26	Jeffrey Earnhardt	Sam Hunt Racing	Toyota	32.698	169.552	—	—
23	51	Jeremy Clements	Jeremy Clements Racing	Chevrolet	32.728	169.396	—	—
24	31	Parker Retzlaff	Jordan Anderson Racing	Chevrolet	32.772	169.169	—	—
25	27	Jeb Burton	Jordan Anderson Racing	Chevrolet	32.796	169.045	—	—
26	28	Kyle Sieg	RSS Racing	Ford	32.853	168.752	—	—
27	38	C. J. McLaughlin	RSS Racing	Ford	32.900	168.511	—	—
28	29	Blaine Perkins	RSS Racing	Ford	32.919	168.413	—	—
29	4	Dawson Cram (R)	JD Motorsports	Chevrolet	32.969	168.158	—	—
30	44	Brennan Poole	Alpha Prime Racing	Chevrolet	33.086	167.563	—	—
31	92	Nick Leitz	DGM Racing	Chevrolet	33.100	167.492	—	—
32	6	Garrett Smithley	JD Motorsports	Chevrolet	33.111	167.437	—	—
33	35	Joey Gase	Joey Gase Motorsports	Chevrolet	33.135	167.316	—	—
Qualified by owner's points
34	43	Ryan Ellis	Alpha Prime Racing	Chevrolet	33.147	167.255	—	—
35	42	Leland Honeyman (R)	Young's Motorsports	Chevrolet	33.151	167.235	—	—
36	14	J. J. Yeley	SS-Green Light Racing	Chevrolet	33.187	167.053	—	—
37	07	Patrick Emerling	SS-Green Light Racing	Chevrolet	33.396	166.008	—	—
38	32	Jordan Anderson	Jordan Anderson Racing	Chevrolet	—	—	—	—
Official qualifying results
Official starting lineup

== Race results ==
Stage 1 Laps: 40

Pos.	#	Driver	Team	Make	Pts
1	2	Jesse Love (R)	Richard Childress Racing	Chevrolet	10
2	98	Riley Herbst	Stewart–Haas Racing	Ford	9
3	1	Sam Mayer	JR Motorsports	Chevrolet	8
4	19	Ryan Truex	Joe Gibbs Racing	Toyota	7
5	48	Parker Kligerman	Big Machine Racing	Chevrolet	6
6	16	A. J. Allmendinger	Kaulig Racing	Chevrolet	5
7	7	Justin Allgaier	JR Motorsports	Chevrolet	4
8	18	Sheldon Creed	Joe Gibbs Racing	Toyota	3
9	39	Ryan Sieg	RSS Racing	Ford	2
10	8	Sammy Smith	JR Motorsports	Chevrolet	1

Stage 2 Laps: 40

Pos.	#	Driver	Team	Make	Pts
1	2	Jesse Love (R)	Richard Childress Racing	Chevrolet	10
2	7	Justin Allgaier	JR Motorsports	Chevrolet	9
3	98	Riley Herbst	Stewart–Haas Racing	Ford	8
4	19	Ryan Truex	Joe Gibbs Racing	Toyota	7
5	8	Sammy Smith	JR Motorsports	Chevrolet	6
6	81	Chandler Smith	Joe Gibbs Racing	Toyota	5
7	00	Cole Custer	Stewart–Haas Racing	Ford	4
8	21	Austin Hill	Richard Childress Racing	Chevrolet	3
9	16	A. J. Allmendinger	Kaulig Racing	Chevrolet	2
10	18	Sheldon Creed	Joe Gibbs Racing	Toyota	1

Stage 3 Laps: 89

Fin	St	#	Driver	Team	Make	Laps	Led	Status	Pts
1	2	21	Austin Hill	Richard Childress Racing	Chevrolet	169	2	Running	43
2	12	81	Chandler Smith	Joe Gibbs Racing	Toyota	169	0	Running	40
3	13	97	Shane van Gisbergen (R)	Kaulig Racing	Chevrolet	169	0	Running	34
4	10	18	Sheldon Creed	Joe Gibbs Racing	Toyota	169	0	Running	37
5	24	31	Parker Retzlaff	Jordan Anderson Racing	Chevrolet	169	0	Running	32
6	23	51	Jeremy Clements	Jeremy Clements Racing	Chevrolet	169	0	Running	31
7	15	5	Anthony Alfredo	Our Motorsports	Chevrolet	169	0	Running	30
8	22	26	Jeffrey Earnhardt	Sam Hunt Racing	Toyota	169	0	Running	29
9	8	19	Ryan Truex	Joe Gibbs Racing	Toyota	169	0	Running	42
10	14	8	Sammy Smith	JR Motorsports	Chevrolet	169	0	Running	34
11	6	1	Sam Mayer	JR Motorsports	Chevrolet	169	0	Running	34
12	1	2	Jesse Love (R)	Richard Childress Racing	Chevrolet	169	157	Running	45
13	7	16	A. J. Allmendinger	Kaulig Racing	Chevrolet	169	8	Running	31
14	18	9	Brandon Jones	JR Motorsports	Chevrolet	169	0	Running	23
15	4	98	Riley Herbst	Stewart–Haas Racing	Ford	168	0	Running	39
16	11	00	Cole Custer	Stewart–Haas Racing	Ford	168	0	Running	25
17	17	91	Kyle Weatherman	DGM Racing	Chevrolet	168	0	Running	20
18	21	78	B. J. McLeod	B. J. McLeod Motorsports	Chevrolet	168	0	Running	19
19	5	48	Parker Kligerman	Big Machine Racing	Chevrolet	168	1	Running	24
20	30	44	Brennan Poole	Alpha Prime Racing	Chevrolet	167	0	Running	17
21	35	42	Leland Honeyman (R)	Young's Motorsports	Chevrolet	167	0	Running	16
22	20	39	Ryan Sieg	RSS Racing	Ford	167	0	Running	17
23	25	27	Jeb Burton	Jordan Anderson Racing	Chevrolet	167	0	Running	14
24	36	14	J. J. Yeley	SS-Green Light Racing	Chevrolet	167	0	Running	13
25	34	43	Ryan Ellis	Alpha Prime Racing	Chevrolet	167	0	Running	12
26	31	92	Nick Leitz	DGM Racing	Chevrolet	167	0	Running	11
27	19	15	Hailie Deegan (R)	AM Racing	Ford	167	0	Running	10
28	9	7	Justin Allgaier	JR Motorsports	Chevrolet	167	0	Running	22
29	33	35	Joey Gase	Joey Gase Motorsports	Chevrolet	166	0	Running	8
30	28	29	Blaine Perkins	RSS Racing	Ford	166	0	Running	7
31	29	4	Dawson Cram (R)	JD Motorsports	Chevrolet	166	0	Running	6
32	3	20	John Hunter Nemechek (i)	Joe Gibbs Racing	Toyota	165	0	Running	0
33	37	07	Patrick Emerling	SS-Green Light Racing	Chevrolet	165	0	Running	4
34	32	6	Garrett Smithley	JD Motorsports	Chevrolet	165	0	Running	3
35	27	38	C. J. McLaughlin	RSS Racing	Ford	164	0	Running	2
36	26	28	Kyle Sieg	RSS Racing	Ford	164	1	Running	1
37	16	11	Josh Williams	Kaulig Racing	Chevrolet	159	0	Running	1
38	38	32	Jordan Anderson	Jordan Anderson Racing	Chevrolet	98	0	Steering	1
Official race results

== Standings after the race ==
Drivers' Championship standings

	Pos	Driver	Points
	1	Austin Hill	102
	2	Sheldon Creed	85 (-17)
	3	Riley Herbst	74 (–28)
3	4	Chandler Smith	72 (–30)
6	5	Jesse Love	72 (–30)
2	6	Parker Retzlaff	66 (–36)
10	7	Ryan Truex	64 (–38)
	8	A. J. Allmendinger	63 (–39)
4	9	Shane van Gisbergen	59 (–43)
5	10	Sammy Smith	57 (–45)
6	11	Justin Allgaier	56 (–46)
3	12	Cole Custer	56 (–46)
Official driver's standings

Manufacturers' Championship standings

Pos	Manufacturer	Points
1	Chevrolet	80
2	Toyota	70 (–10)
3	Ford	53 (–27)

- Note: Only the first 12 positions are included for the driver standings.

Previous race: 2024 United Rentals 300	NASCAR Xfinity Series; 2024 season	Next race: 2024 The LiUNA!
