= 2025 Goodyear 400 =

NASCAR Cup Series race

Race details
- Race 8 of 36 in the 2025 NASCAR Cup Series
- Date: April 6, 2025
- Location: Darlington Raceway in Darlington, South Carolina
- Course: Permanent racing facility
- Course length: 1.366 miles (2.198 km)
- Distance: 297 laps, 405.7 mi (652.81 km)
- Scheduled distance: 293 laps, 400.238 mi (644.121 km)
- Average speed: 120.965 miles per hour (194.674 km/h)

Pole position
| Driver | William Byron | Hendrick Motorsports |
- Time: 28.774

Most laps led
| Driver | William Byron | Hendrick Motorsports |
- Laps: 243

Fastest lap
| Driver | William Byron | Hendrick Motorsports |
- Time: 29.39

Winner
| No. 11 | Denny Hamlin | Joe Gibbs Racing |

Television in the United States
- Network: FS1
- Announcers: Mike Joy, Clint Bowyer, and Kevin Harvick
- Nielsen ratings: 2.52 million

Radio in the United States
- Radio: MRN
- Booth announcers: Alex Hayden, Mike Bagley, and Todd Gordon
- Turn announcers: Dave Moody (1 & 2) and Tim Catafalmo (3 & 4)

The 2025 Goodyear 400 was a NASCAR Cup Series race that was held on April 6, 2025, at Darlington Raceway in Darlington, South Carolina. Contested over 297 laps on the 1.366-mile (2.198 km) egg-shaped oval, extended from the original 293 laps due to an overtime finish, it was the eighth race of the 2025 NASCAR Cup Series season and the 69th running of the event.

Denny Hamlin won the race. William Byron finished 2nd, and Christopher Bell finished 3rd. Tyler Reddick and Ryan Blaney rounded out the top five, and Chris Buescher, Ross Chastain, Chase Elliott, Ty Gibbs, and Kyle Busch rounded out the top ten.

== Report ==
=== Background ===
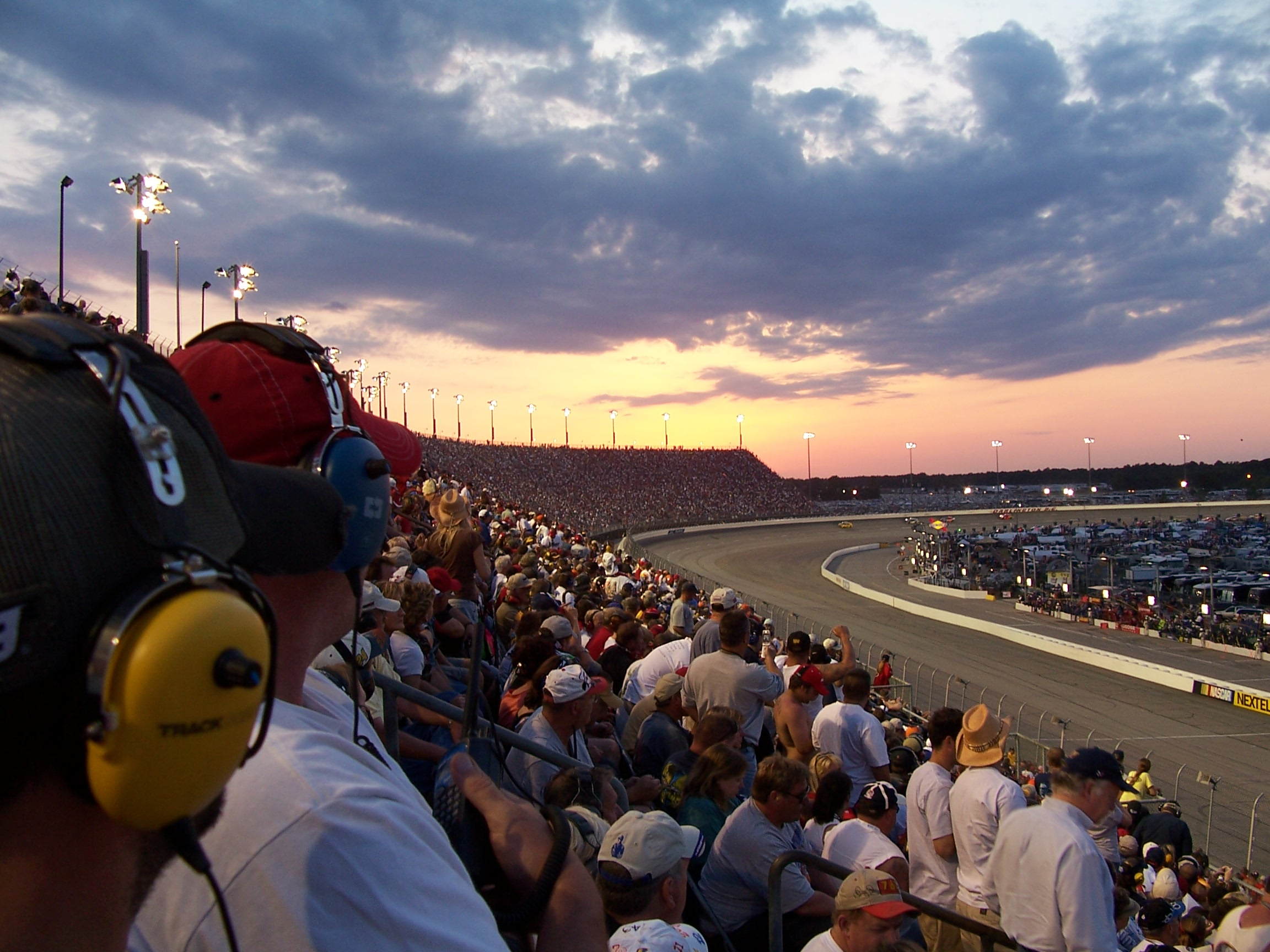
Darlington Raceway where the race was held.

Darlington Raceway is a race track built for NASCAR racing located near Darlington, South Carolina. It is nicknamed "The Lady in Black" and "The Track Too Tough to Tame" by many NASCAR fans and drivers and advertised as "A NASCAR Tradition." It is of a unique, somewhat egg-shaped design, an oval with the ends of very different configurations, a condition which supposedly arose from the proximity of one end of the track to a minnow pond the owner refused to relocate. This situation makes it very challenging for the crews to set up their cars' handling in a way that is effective at both ends.

Since 2015, the race has hosted NASCAR's Throwback weekend, which features cars sporting paint schemes that pay homage to past teams and drivers.

==== Entry list ====
- (R) denotes rookie driver.
- (i) denotes the driver ineligible for series driver points.

| No. | Driver | Team | Manufacturer | Sponsor or throwback |
|---|---|---|---|---|
| 1 | Ross Chastain | Trackhouse Racing | Chevrolet | Busch Light |
| 2 | Austin Cindric | Team Penske | Ford | Freightliner – Dale Earnhardt's No. 2 paint scheme that raced from the 1979 Rookie of the Year and 1980 championship seasons. |
| 3 | Austin Dillon | Richard Childress Racing | Chevrolet | Breztri |
| 4 | Noah Gragson | Front Row Motorsports | Ford | Beef-a-Roo – Dale Earnhardt Jr.'s No. 31 Mom & Pop's paint scheme from his debut race in the 1996 NASCAR Busch Series. |
| 5 | Kyle Larson | Hendrick Motorsports | Chevrolet | HendrickCars.com – Terry Labonte's Kellogg's paint scheme that raced to his final career win at the 2003 Southern 500. |
| 6 | Brad Keselowski | RFK Racing | Ford | Castrol Seven Critical Areas |
| 7 | Justin Haley | Spire Motorsports | Chevrolet | Gainbridge |
| 8 | Kyle Busch | Richard Childress Racing | Chevrolet | Cheddar's Scratch Kitchen |
| 9 | Chase Elliott | Hendrick Motorsports | Chevrolet | UniFirst – Ken Schrader's No. 25 Kodiak paint scheme from the 1994 season. |
| 10 | Ty Dillon | Kaulig Racing | Chevrolet | Sea Best / Beaver Street Fisheries – Patty Moise's No. 45 Beaver Street Foods paint scheme that raced at the 1989 Pepsi 400. |
| 11 | Denny Hamlin | Joe Gibbs Racing | Toyota | Sport Clips Haircuts – Carl Edwards' No. 99 Office Depot paint scheme that from the 2006 and 2007 seasons. |
| 12 | Ryan Blaney | Team Penske | Ford | Dutch Boy / Menards – Dave Blaney's No. 32 Hass Avocados paint scheme that raced in the 2006 NASCAR Busch Series. |
| 16 | A. J. Allmendinger | Kaulig Racing | Chevrolet | Action Industries |
| 17 | Chris Buescher | RFK Racing | Ford | Fifth Third Bank |
| 19 | Chase Briscoe | Joe Gibbs Racing | Toyota | Bass Pro Shops |
| 20 | Christopher Bell | Joe Gibbs Racing | Toyota | DeWalt – Honoring Rick Ferkel, Bell's racing mentor. In addition, the DeWalt logos, on the current color scheme, will be from the time it was owned by American Machine and Foundry. |
| 21 | Josh Berry | Wood Brothers Racing | Ford | Motorcraft – Jim Clark's No. 82 Lotus paint scheme that won him the 1965 Indianapolis 500 (Wood Brothers Racing served as Clark's pit crew for the race). |
| 22 | Joey Logano | Team Penske | Ford | Shell / Pennzoil – Cale Yarborough's No. 11 Holly Farms paint scheme from the 1976 season. |
| 23 | Bubba Wallace | 23XI Racing | Toyota | Columbia |
| 24 | William Byron | Hendrick Motorsports | Chevrolet | Axalta – Jeff Gordon's paint scheme that raced at the 2015 season finale. Was to have been Gordon's last race before retirement. |
| 33 | Austin Hill (i) | Richard Childress Racing | Chevrolet | United Rentals |
| 34 | Todd Gilliland | Front Row Motorsports | Ford | Ruedebusch - Tribute to Ray Fox Sr., a NASCAR mechanic, car owner, and later official. FRM has an alliance with Team Penske, where the No. 12 car chief is his grandson Raymond Fox III, and his son Justin is a tire changer on the No. 34 car. |
| 35 | Riley Herbst (R) | 23XI Racing | Toyota | Monster Energy |
| 38 | Zane Smith | Front Row Motorsports | Ford | Long John Silver's |
| 41 | Cole Custer | Haas Factory Team | Ford | Haas Automation – Jimmy Spencer's Target paint scheme from the early 2000s. |
| 42 | John Hunter Nemechek | Legacy Motor Club | Toyota | Dollar Tree – Joe Nemechek's BellSouth paint scheme from the 1998 season. |
| 43 | Erik Jones | Legacy Motor Club | Toyota | AdventHealth – John Andretti's STP paint scheme from the 1998 season. |
| 44 | J. J. Yeley | NY Racing Team | Chevrolet | Wawa – Bill Elliott's No. 9 Coors paint scheme from the 1985 season. |
| 45 | Tyler Reddick | 23XI Racing | Toyota | McDonald's |
| 47 | Ricky Stenhouse Jr. | Hyak Motorsports | Chevrolet | SunnyD |
| 48 | Alex Bowman | Hendrick Motorsports | Chevrolet | Ally Financial – Jimmie Johnson's Lowe's / Kobalt paint scheme that won him this race in 2012 and marked Hendrick's 200th Cup Series win. |
| 51 | Cody Ware | Rick Ware Racing | Ford | Jacob Companies – Ward Burton's No. 22 Caterpillar paint scheme that raced during the 2000s, honoring crew chief Tommy Baldwin. |
| 54 | Ty Gibbs | Joe Gibbs Racing | Toyota | Monster Energy |
| 60 | Ryan Preece | RFK Racing | Ford | Kroger / Country Crock |
| 71 | Michael McDowell | Spire Motorsports | Chevrolet | Delaware Life |
| 77 | Carson Hocevar | Spire Motorsports | Chevrolet | Zeigler Auto Group |
| 88 | Shane van Gisbergen (R) | Trackhouse Racing | Chevrolet | WeatherTech |
| 99 | Daniel Suárez | Trackhouse Racing | Chevrolet | Quaker State |
Official entry list

== Practice ==
Carson Hocevar was the fastest in the practice session with a time of 29.262 seconds and a speed of 168.054 mph (270.457 km/h).

=== Practice results ===
| Pos | No. | Driver | Team | Manufacturer | Time | Speed |
|---|---|---|---|---|---|---|
| 1 | 77 | Carson Hocevar | Spire Motorsports | Chevrolet | 29.262 | 168.054 |
| 2 | 21 | Josh Berry | Wood Brothers Racing | Ford | 29.415 | 167.180 |
| 3 | 43 | Erik Jones | Legacy Motor Club | Toyota | 29.425 | 167.123 |
Official practice results

== Qualifying ==
William Byron scored the pole for the race with a time of 28.774 and a speed of 170.904 mph (275.043 km/h).

=== Qualifying results ===
| Pos | No. | Driver | Team | Manufacturer | Time | Speed |
|---|---|---|---|---|---|---|
| 1 | 24 | William Byron | Hendrick Motorsports | Chevrolet | 28.774 | 170.904 |
| 2 | 60 | Ryan Preece | RFK Racing | Ford | 28.858 | 170.407 |
| 3 | 11 | Denny Hamlin | Joe Gibbs Racing | Toyota | 28.867 | 170.354 |
| 4 | 19 | Chase Briscoe | Joe Gibbs Racing | Toyota | 28.879 | 170.283 |
| 5 | 23 | Bubba Wallace | 23XI Racing | Toyota | 28.895 | 170.189 |
| 6 | 2 | Austin Cindric | Team Penske | Ford | 28.948 | 169.877 |
| 7 | 45 | Tyler Reddick | 23XI Racing | Toyota | 28.955 | 169.836 |
| 8 | 8 | Kyle Busch | Richard Childress Racing | Chevrolet | 28.957 | 169.824 |
| 9 | 12 | Ryan Blaney | Team Penske | Ford | 28.958 | 169.818 |
| 10 | 71 | Michael McDowell | Spire Motorsports | Chevrolet | 28.972 | 169.736 |
| 11 | 54 | Ty Gibbs | Joe Gibbs Racing | Toyota | 28.975 | 169.719 |
| 12 | 34 | Todd Gilliland | Front Row Motorsports | Ford | 28.987 | 169.648 |
| 13 | 77 | Carson Hocevar | Spire Motorsports | Chevrolet | 28.994 | 169.608 |
| 14 | 17 | Chris Buescher | RFK Racing | Ford | 28.996 | 169.596 |
| 15 | 9 | Chase Elliott | Hendrick Motorsports | Chevrolet | 29.001 | 169.567 |
| 16 | 38 | Zane Smith | Front Row Motorsports | Ford | 29.008 | 169.526 |
| 17 | 20 | Christopher Bell | Joe Gibbs Racing | Toyota | 29.015 | 169.485 |
| 18 | 22 | Joey Logano | Team Penske | Ford | 29.039 | 169.345 |
| 19 | 5 | Kyle Larson | Hendrick Motorsports | Chevrolet | 29.078 | 169.118 |
| 20 | 6 | Brad Keselowski | RFK Racing | Ford | 29.172 | 168.573 |
| 21 | 7 | Justin Haley | Spire Motorsports | Chevrolet | 29.185 | 168.498 |
| 22 | 16 | A. J. Allmendinger | Kaulig Racing | Chevrolet | 29.230 | 168.238 |
| 23 | 3 | Austin Dillon | Richard Childress Racing | Chevrolet | 29.255 | 168.094 |
| 24 | 21 | Josh Berry | Wood Brothers Racing | Ford | 29.265 | 168.037 |
| 25 | 1 | Ross Chastain | Trackhouse Racing | Chevrolet | 29.285 | 167.922 |
| 26 | 4 | Noah Gragson | Front Row Motorsports | Ford | 29.292 | 167.882 |
| 27 | 42 | John Hunter Nemechek | Legacy Motor Club | Toyota | 29.315 | 167.750 |
| 28 | 47 | Ricky Stenhouse Jr. | Hyak Motorsports | Chevrolet | 29.318 | 167.733 |
| 29 | 10 | Ty Dillon | Kaulig Racing | Chevrolet | 29.412 | 167.197 |
| 30 | 99 | Daniel Suárez | Trackhouse Racing | Chevrolet | 29.457 | 166.942 |
| 31 | 41 | Cole Custer | Haas Factory Team | Ford | 29.483 | 166.794 |
| 32 | 35 | Riley Herbst (R) | 23XI Racing | Toyota | 29.525 | 166.557 |
| 33 | 48 | Alex Bowman | Hendrick Motorsports | Chevrolet | 29.572 | 166.292 |
| 34 | 43 | Erik Jones | Legacy Motor Club | Toyota | 29.617 | 166.040 |
| 35 | 51 | Cody Ware | Rick Ware Racing | Ford | 29.757 | 165.259 |
| 36 | 88 | Shane van Gisbergen (R) | Trackhouse Racing | Chevrolet | 29.928 | 164.314 |
| 37 | 33 | Austin Hill (i) | Richard Childress Racing | Chevrolet | 30.070 | 163.538 |
| 38 | 44 | J. J. Yeley | NY Racing Team | Chevrolet | 30.314 | 162.222 |
Official qualifying results

== Race ==
=== Race results ===
==== Stage results ====
Stage One Laps: 90

| Pos | No | Driver | Team | Manufacturer | Points |
|---|---|---|---|---|---|
| 1 | 24 | William Byron | Hendrick Motorsports | Chevrolet | 10 |
| 2 | 23 | Bubba Wallace | 23XI Racing | Toyota | 9 |
| 3 | 60 | Ryan Preece | RFK Racing | Ford | 8 |
| 4 | 17 | Chris Buescher | RFK Racing | Ford | 7 |
| 5 | 45 | Tyler Reddick | 23XI Racing | Toyota | 6 |
| 6 | 6 | Brad Keselowski | RFK Racing | Ford | 5 |
| 7 | 12 | Ryan Blaney | Team Penske | Ford | 4 |
| 8 | 2 | Austin Cindric | Team Penske | Ford | 3 |
| 9 | 38 | Zane Smith | Front Row Motorsports | Ford | 2 |
| 10 | 16 | A. J. Allmendinger | Kaulig Racing | Chevrolet | 1 |
Official stage one results

Stage Two Laps: 95

| Pos | No | Driver | Team | Manufacturer | Points |
|---|---|---|---|---|---|
| 1 | 24 | William Byron | Hendrick Motorsports | Chevrolet | 10 |
| 2 | 22 | Joey Logano | Team Penske | Ford | 9 |
| 3 | 11 | Denny Hamlin | Joe Gibbs Racing | Toyota | 8 |
| 4 | 12 | Ryan Blaney | Team Penske | Ford | 7 |
| 5 | 21 | Josh Berry | Wood Brothers Racing | Ford | 6 |
| 6 | 20 | Christopher Bell | Joe Gibbs Racing | Toyota | 5 |
| 7 | 54 | Ty Gibbs | Joe Gibbs Racing | Toyota | 4 |
| 8 | 10 | Ty Dillon | Kaulig Racing | Chevrolet | 3 |
| 9 | 45 | Tyler Reddick | 23XI Racing | Toyota | 2 |
| 10 | 48 | Alex Bowman | Hendrick Motorsports | Chevrolet | 1 |
Official stage two results

=== Final Stage results ===
Stage Three Laps: 108

| Pos | Grid | No | Driver | Team | Manufacturer | Laps | Points |
|---|---|---|---|---|---|---|---|
| 1 | 3 | 11 | Denny Hamlin | Joe Gibbs Racing | Toyota | 297 | 48 |
| 2 | 1 | 24 | William Byron | Hendrick Motorsports | Chevrolet | 297 | 56 |
| 3 | 17 | 20 | Christopher Bell | Joe Gibbs Racing | Toyota | 297 | 39 |
| 4 | 7 | 45 | Tyler Reddick | 23XI Racing | Toyota | 297 | 41 |
| 5 | 9 | 12 | Ryan Blaney | Team Penske | Ford | 297 | 43 |
| 6 | 14 | 17 | Chris Buescher | RFK Racing | Ford | 297 | 38 |
| 7 | 25 | 1 | Ross Chastain | Trackhouse Racing | Chevrolet | 297 | 30 |
| 8 | 15 | 9 | Chase Elliott | Hendrick Motorsports | Chevrolet | 297 | 29 |
| 9 | 11 | 54 | Ty Gibbs | Joe Gibbs Racing | Toyota | 297 | 32 |
| 10 | 8 | 8 | Kyle Busch | Richard Childress Racing | Chevrolet | 297 | 27 |
| 11 | 6 | 2 | Austin Cindric | Team Penske | Ford | 297 | 29 |
| 12 | 16 | 38 | Zane Smith | Front Row Motorsports | Ford | 297 | 27 |
| 13 | 18 | 22 | Joey Logano | Team Penske | Ford | 297 | 33 |
| 14 | 12 | 34 | Todd Gilliland | Front Row Motorsports | Ford | 297 | 23 |
| 15 | 30 | 99 | Daniel Suárez | Trackhouse Racing | Chevrolet | 297 | 22 |
| 16 | 29 | 10 | Ty Dillon | Kaulig Racing | Chevrolet | 297 | 24 |
| 17 | 34 | 43 | Erik Jones | Legacy Motor Club | Toyota | 297 | 20 |
| 18 | 22 | 16 | A. J. Allmendinger | Kaulig Racing | Chevrolet | 297 | 20 |
| 19 | 26 | 4 | Noah Gragson | Front Row Motorsports | Ford | 297 | 18 |
| 20 | 36 | 88 | Shane van Gisbergen (R) | Trackhouse Racing | Chevrolet | 297 | 17 |
| 21 | 5 | 23 | Bubba Wallace | 23XI Racing | Toyota | 297 | 25 |
| 22 | 31 | 41 | Cole Custer | Haas Factory Team | Ford | 297 | 15 |
| 23 | 23 | 3 | Austin Dillon | Richard Childress Racing | Chevrolet | 297 | 14 |
| 24 | 21 | 7 | Justin Haley | Spire Motorsports | Chevrolet | 297 | 13 |
| 25 | 28 | 47 | Ricky Stenhouse Jr. | Hyak Motorsports | Chevrolet | 297 | 12 |
| 26 | 2 | 60 | Ryan Preece | RFK Racing | Ford | 297 | 19 |
| 27 | 35 | 51 | Cody Ware | Rick Ware Racing | Ford | 297 | 10 |
| 28 | 4 | 19 | Chase Briscoe | Joe Gibbs Racing | Toyota | 297 | 9 |
| 29 | 10 | 71 | Michael McDowell | Spire Motorsports | Chevrolet | 297 | 8 |
| 30 | 27 | 42 | John Hunter Nemechek | Legacy Motor Club | Toyota | 297 | 7 |
| 31 | 37 | 33 | Austin Hill (i) | Richard Childress Racing | Chevrolet | 296 | 0 |
| 32 | 13 | 77 | Carson Hocevar | Spire Motorsports | Chevrolet | 296 | 5 |
| 33 | 20 | 6 | Brad Keselowski | RFK Racing | Ford | 295 | 9 |
| 34 | 32 | 35 | Riley Herbst (R) | 23XI Racing | Toyota | 295 | 3 |
| 35 | 33 | 48 | Alex Bowman | Hendrick Motorsports | Chevrolet | 280 | 3 |
| 36 | 24 | 21 | Josh Berry | Wood Brothers Racing | Ford | 195 | 7 |
| 37 | 19 | 5 | Kyle Larson | Hendrick Motorsports | Chevrolet | 122 | 1 |
| 38 | 38 | 44 | J. J. Yeley | NY Racing Team | Chevrolet | 30 | 1 |
Official race results

=== Race statistics ===
- Lead changes: 4 among 4 different drivers
- Cautions/Laps: 8 for 45
- Red flags: 0
- Time of race: 3 hours, 21 minutes, and 14 seconds
- Average speed: 120.965 miles per hour (194.674 km/h)

== Media ==
=== Television ===
The race was carried by FS1 in the United States. Mike Joy, Clint Bowyer, and Kevin Harvick called the race from the broadcast booth. Jamie Little and Regan Smith handled the pit road for the television side. Larry McReynolds provided insight on-site during the race.

FS1
| Booth announcers | Pit reporters | In-race analyst |
|---|---|---|
| Lap-by-lap: Mike Joy; Color-commentator: Clint Bowyer; Color-commentator: Kevin Harvick | Jamie Little; Regan Smith | Larry McReynolds |

=== Radio ===
MRN had the radio call for the race, which was also simulcasted on Sirius XM NASCAR Radio.

MRN Radio
| Booth announcers | Turn announcers | Pit reporters |
|---|---|---|
| Lead announcer: Alex Hayden; Announcer: Mike Bagley; Announcer: Todd Gordon | Turns 1 & 2: Dave Moody; Turns 3 & 4: Tim Catafalmo | Steve Post; Chris Wilner; Alan Cavanna; Brienne Pedigo |

== Standings after the race ==
Drivers' Championship standings

| | Pos | Driver | Points |
|---|---|---|---|
| | 1 | William Byron | 315 |
| 4 | 2 | Denny Hamlin | 266 (–49) |
| 1 | 3 | Christopher Bell | 263 (–52) |
| 1 | 4 | Chase Elliott | 256 (–59) |
| 2 | 5 | Tyler Reddick | 254 (–61) |
| 4 | 6 | Kyle Larson | 244 (–71) |
| 3 | 7 | Ryan Blaney | 236 (–79) |
| | 8 | Bubba Wallace | 233 (–82) |
| | 9 | Joey Logano | 232 (–83) |
| 5 | 10 | Alex Bowman | 227 (–88) |
| | 11 | Chris Buescher | 215 (–100) |
| 1 | 12 | Ross Chastain | 199 (–116) |
| 1 | 13 | Ryan Preece | 184 (–131) |
| 2 | 14 | Chase Briscoe | 178 (–137) |
| 1 | 15 | Kyle Busch | 177 (–138) |
| 2 | 16 | A. J. Allmendinger | 168 (–147) |
Official driver's standings

Manufacturers' Championship standings

| Pos | Manufacturer | Points |
|---|---|---|
| 1 | Toyota | 294 |
| 2 | Chevrolet | 287 (–7) |
| 3 | Ford | 259 (–35) |

- Note: Only the first 16 positions are included for the driver standings.

| Previous race: 2025 Cook Out 400 (Martinsville) | NASCAR Cup Series; 2025 season | Next race: 2025 Food City 500 |
