= 2022 Explore the Pocono Mountains 225 =

19th race of the 2022 NASCAR Xfinity Series

Race details
- Race 19 of 33 of the 2022 NASCAR Xfinity Series
- Date: July 23, 2022
- Official name: Seventh Annual Explore the Pocono Mountains 225
- Location: Pocono Raceway, Long Pond, Pennsylvania
- Course: Permanent racing facility
- Course length: 2.5 miles (4.0 km)
- Distance: 90 laps, 225 mi (362.102 km)
- Scheduled distance: 90 laps, 225 mi (362.102 km)
- Average speed: 123.438 mph (198.654 km/h)

Pole position
Driver	Justin Allgaier	JR Motorsports
- Time: 53.359

Most laps led
Driver	Noah Gragson	JR Motorsports
- Laps: 43

Winner
No. 9	Noah Gragson	JR Motorsports

Television in the United States
- Network: USA Network
- Announcers: Rick Allen, Jeff Burton, Steve Letarte

Radio in the United States
- Radio: Motor Racing Network

The 2022 Explore the Pocono Mountains 225 was the 19th stock car race of the 2022 NASCAR Xfinity Series, and the seventh iteration of the event. The race was held on Saturday, July 23, 2022, in Long Pond, Pennsylvania at Pocono Raceway, a 2.5 miles (4.0 km) permanent triangular-shaped racetrack. The race took the scheduled 90 laps to complete. Noah Gragson, driving for JR Motorsports, held off Ty Gibbs in an outstanding battle with 22 laps to go, and earned his eighth career NASCAR Xfinity Series win, and his third of the season. Gragson would also dominate most of the race, leading 43 laps. To fill out the podium, Josh Berry, driving for JR Motorsports, would finish 3rd, respectively.

The race was marred by a wreck on lap 45. Santino Ferrucci would get spun coming out of turn 3. Ricky Stenhouse Jr., with nowhere to go, would t-bone the side of Ferrucci's car. Stenhouse came back down onto the racetrack, as everyone was attempting to make it through the wreck. Jeb Burton had attempted to go lower down the track to avoid the wreck, but was unsuccessful. Burton would clip the front of Stenhouse's car, causing him to flip on his roof, in turn becoming the 500th confirmed flip in NASCAR history. His car would come to rest right after the start-finish line. Ronnie Bassett Jr. and Jeremy Clements would also be involved in the crash. All drivers were released from the infield care center several minutes later.

== Background ==
Pocono Raceway (formerly Pocono International Raceway), also known as The Tricky Triangle, is a superspeedway located in the Pocono Mountains in Long Pond, Pennsylvania. It is the site of three NASCAR national series races and an ARCA Menards Series event in July: a NASCAR Cup Series race with support events by the NASCAR Xfinity Series and NASCAR Camping World Truck Series. From 1971 to 1989, and from 2013 to 2019, the track also hosted an Indy Car race, currently sanctioned by the IndyCar Series. Additionally, from 1982 to 2021, it hosted two NASCAR Cup Series races, with the traditional first date being removed for 2022.

Pocono is one of the few NASCAR tracks not owned by either NASCAR or Speedway Motorsports, the dominant track owners in NASCAR. Pocono CEO Nick Igdalsky and president Ben May are members of the family-owned Mattco Inc, started by Joseph II and Rose Mattioli. Mattco also owns South Boston Speedway in South Boston, Virginia.

Outside NASCAR and IndyCar Series races, Pocono is used throughout the year by the Stock Car Experience, Bertil Roos Driving School, Sports Car Club of America (SCCA) as well as many other clubs and organizations. The triangular track also has three separate infield sections of racetrack – the north course, east course and south course. Each of these infield sections use separate portions of the track or can be combined for longer and more technical course configurations. In total Pocono Raceway has offers 22 different road course configurations ranging from .5 miles to 3.65 miles in length. During regular non-race weekends, multiple clubs or driving schools can use the track simultaneously by running on different infield sections. All of the infield sections can also be run in either clockwise or counter clockwise direction which doubles the 22 course configuration to 44 total course options.

=== Entry list ===
#	Driver	Team	Make
1	Sam Mayer	JR Motorsports	Chevrolet
02	Brett Moffitt	Our Motorsports	Chevrolet
2	Sheldon Creed (R)	Richard Childress Racing	Chevrolet
4	Bayley Currey	JD Motorsports	Chevrolet
5	Stefan Parsons (i)	B. J. McLeod Motorsports	Chevrolet
6	Ryan Vargas	JD Motorsports	Chevrolet
07	Cole Custer (i)	SS-Green Light Racing	Ford
7	Justin Allgaier	JR Motorsports	Chevrolet
08	David Starr	SS-Green Light Racing	Ford
8	Josh Berry	JR Motorsports	Chevrolet
9	Noah Gragson	JR Motorsports	Chevrolet
10	Landon Cassill	Kaulig Racing	Chevrolet
11	Daniel Hemric	Kaulig Racing	Chevrolet
13	Timmy Hill (i)	MBM Motorsports	Toyota
16	A. J. Allmendinger	Kaulig Racing	Chevrolet
18	Sammy Smith	Joe Gibbs Racing	Toyota
19	Brandon Jones	Joe Gibbs Racing	Toyota
21	Austin Hill (R)	Richard Childress Racing	Chevrolet
23	Anthony Alfredo	Our Motorsports	Chevrolet
26	Santino Ferrucci	Sam Hunt Racing	Toyota
27	Jeb Burton	Our Motorsports	Chevrolet
31	Myatt Snider	Jordan Anderson Racing	Chevrolet
34	Kyle Weatherman	Jesse Iwuji Motorsports	Chevrolet
35	Patrick Emerling	Emerling-Gase Motorsports	Ford
36	Alex Labbé	DGM Racing	Chevrolet
38	Kyle Sieg	RSS Racing	Ford
39	Ryan Sieg	RSS Racing	Ford
44	Rajah Caruth (i)	Alpha Prime Racing	Chevrolet
45	Sage Karam	Alpha Prime Racing	Chevrolet
47	Brennan Poole (i)	Mike Harmon Racing	Chevrolet
48	Ricky Stenhouse Jr. (i)	Big Machine Racing	Chevrolet
51	Jeremy Clements	Jeremy Clements Racing	Chevrolet
54	Ty Gibbs	Joe Gibbs Racing	Toyota
66	J. J. Yeley	MBM Motorsports	Ford
68	Brandon Brown	Brandonbilt Motorsports	Chevrolet
77	Ronnie Bassett Jr.	Bassett Racing	Chevrolet
78	Josh Williams	B. J. McLeod Motorsports	Chevrolet
91	Mason Massey	DGM Racing	Chevrolet
98	Riley Herbst	Stewart-Haas Racing	Ford
Official entry list

== Practice ==
The only 30-minute practice session was held on Saturday, July 23, at 9:30 AM EST. Brandon Jones, driving for Joe Gibbs Racing, was the fastest in the session, with a lap of 54.339, and an average speed of 165.627 mph (266.551 km/h).

Pos.	#	Driver	Team	Make	Time	Speed
1	19	Brandon Jones	Joe Gibbs Racing	Toyota	54.339	165.627
2	54	Ty Gibbs	Joe Gibbs Racing	Toyota	54.383	165.493
3	98	Riley Herbst	Stewart-Haas Racing	Ford	54.409	165.414
Full practice results

== Qualifying ==
Qualifying was held on Saturday, July 23, at 10:00 AM EST. Since Pocono Raceway is a tri-oval track, the qualifying system used is a single-car, single-lap system with only one round. Whoever sets the fastest time in the round wins the pole.

Justin Allgaier, driving for JR Motorsports, scored the pole for the race, with a lap of 53.359, and an average speed of 168.669 mph (271.446 km/h).

Pos.	#	Driver	Team	Make	Time	Speed
1	7	Justin Allgaier	JR Motorsports	Chevrolet	53.359	168.669
2	54	Ty Gibbs	Joe Gibbs Racing	Toyota	53.470	168.319
3	19	Brandon Jones	Joe Gibbs Racing	Toyota	53.588	167.948
4	16	A. J. Allmendinger	Kaulig Racing	Chevrolet	53.604	167.898
5	18	Sammy Smith	Joe Gibbs Racing	Toyota	53.620	167.848
6	2	Sheldon Creed (R)	Richard Childress Racing	Chevrolet	53.642	167.779
7	8	Josh Berry	JR Motorsports	Chevrolet	53.911	166.942
8	21	Austin Hill (R)	Richard Childress Racing	Chevrolet	53.984	166.716
9	9	Noah Gragson	JR Motorsports	Chevrolet	54.235	165.945
10	48	Ricky Stenhouse Jr. (i)	Big Machine Racing	Chevrolet	54.270	165.837
11	26	Santino Ferrucci	Sam Hunt Racing	Toyota	54.293	165.767
12	1	Sam Mayer	JR Motorsports	Chevrolet	54.329	165.657
13	11	Daniel Hemric	Kaulig Racing	Chevrolet	54.366	165.545
14	98	Riley Herbst	Stewart-Haas Racing	Ford	54.380	165.502
15	39	Ryan Sieg	RSS Racing	Ford	54.471	165.226
16	07	Cole Custer (i)	SS-Green Light Racing	Ford	54.489	165.171
17	02	Brett Moffitt	Our Motorsports	Chevrolet	54.508	165.113
18	51	Jeremy Clements	Jeremy Clements Racing	Chevrolet	54.693	164.555
19	27	Jeb Burton	Our Motorsports	Chevrolet	54.759	164.357
20	38	Kyle Sieg	RSS Racing	Ford	54.775	164.309
21	10	Landon Cassill	Kaulig Racing	Chevrolet	54.907	163.914
22	36	Alex Labbé	DGM Racing	Chevrolet	54.919	163.878
23	4	Bayley Currey	JD Motorsports	Chevrolet	54.950	163.785
24	23	Anthony Alfredo	Our Motorsports	Chevrolet	55.032	163.541
25	34	Kyle Weatherman	Jesse Iwuji Motorsports	Chevrolet	55.120	163.280
26	68	Brandon Brown	Brandonbilt Motorsports	Chevrolet	55.127	163.259
27	45	Sage Karam	Alpha Prime Racing	Chevrolet	55.281	162.805
28	31	Myatt Snider	Jordan Anderson Racing	Chevrolet	55.346	162.613
29	91	Mason Massey	DGM Racing	Chevrolet	55.352	162.596
30	5	Stefan Parsons (i)	B. J. McLeod Motorsports	Chevrolet	55.362	162.566
31	77	Ronnie Bassett Jr.	Bassett Racing	Chevrolet	55.366	162.555
32	44	Rajah Caruth (i)	Alpha Prime Racing	Chevrolet	55.368	162.549
33	78	Josh Williams	B. J. McLeod Motorsports	Chevrolet	55.590	161.900
Qualified by owner's points
34	08	David Starr	SS-Green Light Racing	Ford	55.659	161.699
35	6	Ryan Vargas	JD Motorsports	Chevrolet	55.762	161.400
36	35	Patrick Emerling	Emerling-Gase Motorsports	Ford	55.920	160.944
37	13	Timmy Hill (i)	MBM Motorsports	Toyota	56.212	160.108
38	66	J. J. Yeley	MBM Motorsports	Ford	-	-
Failed to qualify
39	47	Brennan Poole (i)	Mike Harmon Racing	Chevrolet	-	-
Official qualifying results
Official starting lineup

== Race results ==
Stage 1 Laps: 20

Pos.	#	Driver	Team	Make	Pts
1	7	Justin Allgaier	JR Motorsports	Chevrolet	10
2	19	Brandon Jones	Joe Gibbs Racing	Toyota	9
3	16	A. J. Allmendinger	Kaulig Racing	Chevrolet	8
4	54	Ty Gibbs	Joe Gibbs Racing	Toyota	7
5	2	Sheldon Creed (R)	Richard Childress Racing	Chevrolet	6
6	8	Josh Berry	JR Motorsports	Chevrolet	5
7	9	Noah Gragson	JR Motorsports	Chevrolet	4
8	18	Sammy Smith	Joe Gibbs Racing	Toyota	3
9	11	Daniel Hemric	Kaulig Racing	Chevrolet	2
10	21	Austin Hill (R)	Richard Childress Racing	Chevrolet	1

Stage 2 Laps: 20

Pos.	#	Driver	Team	Make	Pts
1	9	Noah Gragson	JR Motorsports	Chevrolet	10
2	54	Ty Gibbs	Joe Gibbs Racing	Toyota	9
3	19	Brandon Jones	Joe Gibbs Racing	Toyota	8
4	2	Sheldon Creed (R)	Richard Childress Racing	Chevrolet	7
5	8	Josh Berry	JR Motorsports	Chevrolet	6
6	7	Justin Allgaier	JR Motorsports	Chevrolet	5
7	16	A. J. Allmendinger	Kaulig Racing	Chevrolet	4
8	10	Landon Cassill	Kaulig Racing	Chevrolet	3
9	11	Daniel Hemric	Kaulig Racing	Chevrolet	2
10	21	Austin Hill (R)	Richard Childress Racing	Chevrolet	1

Stage 3 Laps: 50

Fin.	St	#	Driver	Team	Make	Laps	Led	Status	Pts
1	9	9	Noah Gragson	JR Motorsports	Chevrolet	90	43	Running	54
2	2	54	Ty Gibbs	Joe Gibbs Racing	Toyota	90	3	Running	51
3	7	8	Josh Berry	JR Motorsports	Chevrolet	90	9	Running	45
4	4	16	A. J. Allmendinger	Kaulig Racing	Chevrolet	90	0	Running	45
5	6	2	Sheldon Creed (R)	Richard Childress Racing	Chevrolet	90	0	Running	45
6	12	1	Sam Mayer	JR Motorsports	Chevrolet	90	0	Running	31
7	1	7	Justin Allgaier	JR Motorsports	Chevrolet	90	22	Running	45
8	8	21	Austin Hill (R)	Richard Childress Racing	Chevrolet	90	4	Running	31
9	13	11	Daniel Hemric	Kaulig Racing	Chevrolet	90	0	Running	32
10	16	07	Cole Custer (i)	SS-Green Light Racing	Ford	90	0	Running	0
11	21	10	Landon Cassill	Kaulig Racing	Chevrolet	90	0	Running	29
12	14	98	Riley Herbst	Stewart-Haas Racing	Ford	90	4	Running	25
13	26	68	Brandon Brown	Brandonbilt Motorsports	Chevrolet	90	0	Running	24
14	28	31	Myatt Snider	Jordan Anderson Racing	Chevrolet	90	0	Running	23
15	15	39	Ryan Sieg	RSS Racing	Ford	90	0	Running	22
16	24	23	Anthony Alfredo	Our Motorsports	Chevrolet	90	3	Running	21
17	3	19	Brandon Jones	Joe Gibbs Racing	Toyota	90	0	Running	37
18	17	02	Brett Moffitt	Our Motorsports	Chevrolet	90	2	Running	19
19	25	34	Kyle Weatherman	Jesse Iwuji Motorsports	Chevrolet	90	0	Running	18
20	27	45	Sage Karam	Alpha Prime Racing	Chevrolet	90	0	Running	17
21	33	78	Josh Williams	B. J. McLeod Motorsports	Chevrolet	90	0	Running	16
22	20	38	Kyle Sieg	RSS Racing	Ford	90	0	Running	15
23	30	5	Stefan Parsons (i)	B. J. McLeod Motorsports	Chevrolet	90	0	Running	0
24	29	91	Mason Massey	DGM Racing	Chevrolet	90	0	Running	13
25	35	6	Ryan Vargas	JD Motorsports	Chevrolet	89	0	Running	12
26	23	4	Bayley Currey	JD Motorsports	Chevrolet	89	0	Running	11
27	34	08	David Starr	SS-Green Light Racing	Ford	89	0	Running	10
28	38	66	J. J. Yeley	MBM Motorsports	Ford	89	0	Running	9
29	36	35	Patrick Emerling	Emerling-Gase Motorsports	Ford	89	0	Running	8
30	37	13	Timmy Hill (i)	MBM Motorsports	Toyota	89	0	Running	0
31	5	18	Sammy Smith	Joe Gibbs Racing	Toyota	53	0	Accident	9
32	18	51	Jeremy Clements	Jeremy Clements Racing	Chevrolet	48	0	Accident	5
33	19	27	Jeb Burton	Our Motorsports	Chevrolet	46	0	Accident	4
34	10	48	Ricky Stenhouse Jr. (i)	Big Machine Racing	Chevrolet	45	0	Accident	0
35	11	26	Santino Ferrucci	Sam Hunt Racing	Toyota	45	0	Accident	2
36	31	77	Ronnie Bassett Jr.	Bassett Racing	Chevrolet	45	0	Accident	1
37	22	36	Alex Labbé	DGM Racing	Chevrolet	1	0	Accident	1
38	32	44	Rajah Caruth (i)	Alpha Prime Racing	Chevrolet	1	0	Accident	0
Official race results

== Standings after the race ==
Drivers' Championship standings

Pos	Driver	Points
1	A. J. Allmendinger	747
2	Justin Allgaier	731 (-16)
3	Ty Gibbs	725 (-22)
4	Josh Berry	660 (-87)
5	Noah Gragson	657 (-90)
6	Austin Hill	600 (-147)
7	Brandon Jones	574 (-173)
8	Sam Mayer	543 (-204)
9	Riley Herbst	518 (-250)
10	Daniel Hemric	497 (-250)
11	Ryan Sieg	461 (-286)
12	Landon Cassill	451 (-296)
Official driver's standings

- Note: Only the first 12 positions are included for the driver standings.

Previous race: 2022 Crayon 200	NASCAR Xfinity Series; 2022 season	Next race: 2022 Pennzoil 150
