= Ronnie Bassett Jr. =

American racing driver

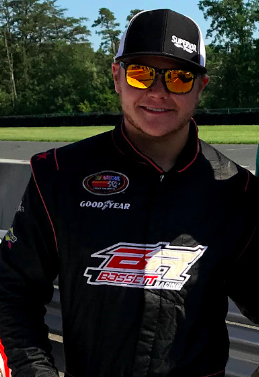
- Bassett at New Jersey Motorsports Park in 2018
- Born: Ronald W. Bassett Jr. December 21, 1995 (age 30) Winston-Salem, North Carolina, U.S.
- Relatives: Dillon Bassett (brother)

NASCAR K&N Pro Series East career
- Starts: 67
- Wins: 1
- Best finish: 3rd in 2017

NASCAR O'Reilly Auto Parts Series career
- 21 races run over 4 years
- 2022 position: 65th
- Best finish: 35th (2019)
- First race: 2019 iK9 Service Dog 200 (Phoenix)
- Last race: 2022 Food City 300 (Bristol)
Wins	Top tens	Poles
0	0	0
- Statistics up to date as of February 18, 2025.

Ronald W. Bassett Jr. (born December 21, 1995) is an American professional stock car racing driver. He currently competes in the zMAX CARS Tour, driving the No. 04 for his own team, Bassett Racing. He last competed part-time in the NASCAR Xfinity Series, driving the No. 77 Chevrolet Camaro for his team, Bassett Racing. He and his family team also previously competed part-time in the NASCAR Xfinity Series, as well as full-time in what is now the ARCA Menards Series East. He is the brother of Dillon Bassett, who also drives for and co-owns Bassett Racing.

== Racing career ==
As part of his early racing career, Bassett raced Bandolero cars, Legends cars and late models, often competing against his brother Dillon.

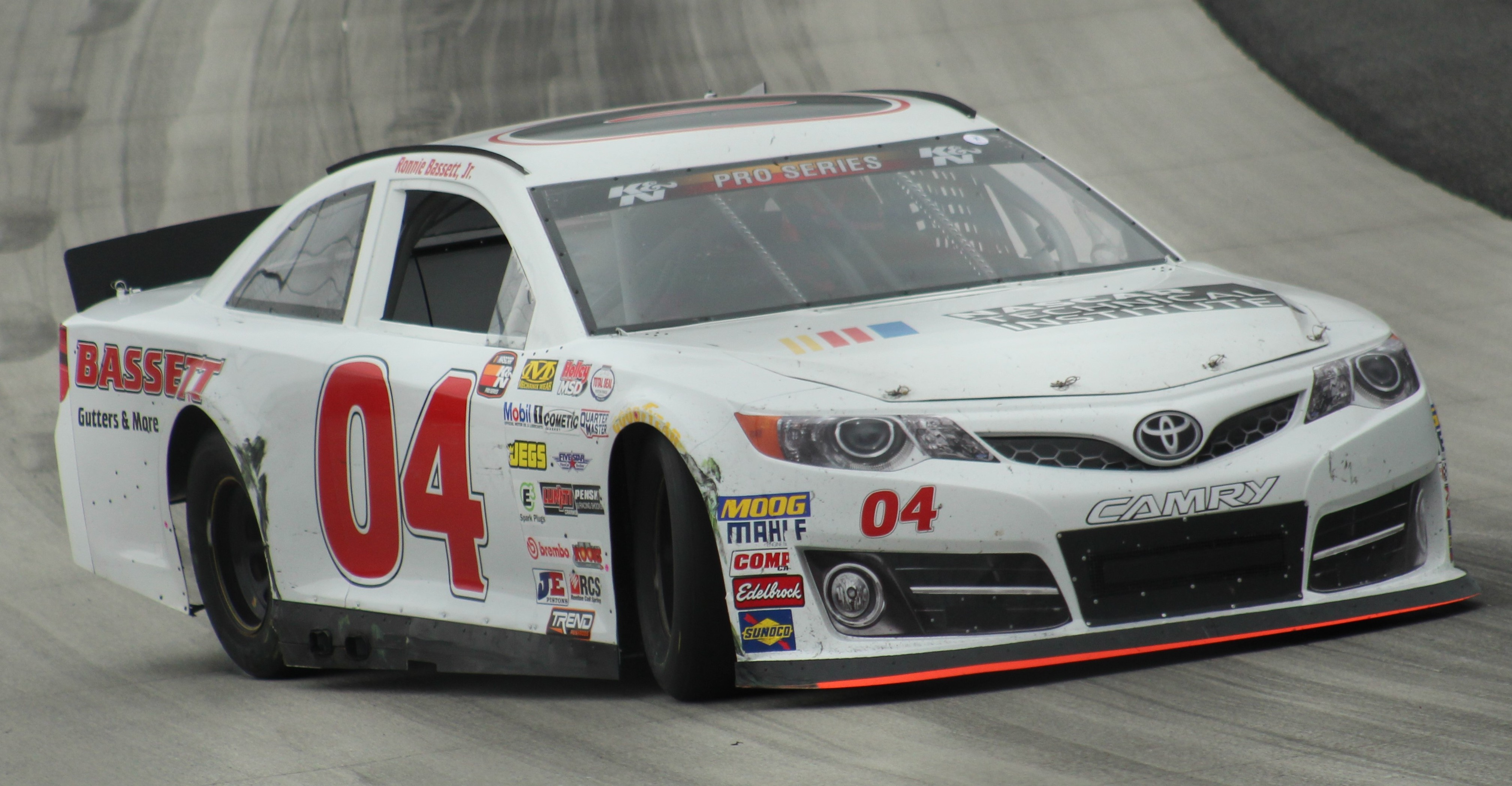
Bassett racing at Dover International Speedway in 2018

In May 2016, a fire swept through the Bassett Racing shop, rendering most of the team's NASCAR K&N Pro Series East equipment unusable. Bassett found reprieve with Calabrese Motorsports, who offered Bassett a ride in the team's No. 43 for the next race.

In 2017, Bassett won his first career K&N Pro Series East race in the New Smyrna 175, showing strength in the late portions of the race. Throughout his time in the East Series, Ronnie would amass 67 starts (with all but two coming for his family team) and one win.

Bassett made his Xfinity Series debut at ISM Raceway in March 2019, driving the No. 90 Chevrolet for DGM Racing. He returned to the team for the race at Texas Motor Speedway, where Bassett scored a top-fifteen finish after having to start from the rear of the field.

On February 2, 2021, it was announced that the Bassett brothers had split from DGM Racing and would be restarting their family team, Bassett Racing, which would field the No. 77 Chevrolet Camaro full-time in the Xfinity Series that year. Ronnie and Dillon Bassett would share the car with the likely possibility of additional drivers also making starts in select races. DGM crew chief Nathan Kennedy also moved over with the Bassett brothers to their new team. However, the races that they attempted for Bassett Racing, they failed to qualify, so they moved back to DGM Racing. The only attempt that Bassett Racing made during the year was with Austin Dillon at the Pit Boss 250.

== Personal life ==
Bassett's younger brother Dillon also competes in NASCAR. The two raced together for family-operated Bassett Racing in the NASCAR K&N series, owned by their father Ronnie Sr.

== Motorsports career results ==
=== Stock car career summary ===
Season	Series	Team	Races	Wins	Top 5	Top 10	Points	Position
2013	NASCAR K&N Pro Series East	Bassett Racing	2	0	0	1	68	35th
2014	NASCAR K&N Pro Series East	Bassett Racing	16	0	3	6	491	11th
2015	NASCAR K&N Pro Series West	Bassett Racing	1	0	0	1	34	49th
2015	NASCAR K&N Pro Series East	Bassett Racing	12	0	2	3	340	15th
2016	NASCAR K&N Pro Series East	Bassett Racing	7	0	4	5	286	15th
2016	NASCAR K&N Pro Series East	Calabrese Motorsports	2	0	0	0	286	15th
2017	NASCAR K&N Pro Series West	Bassett Racing	1	0	0	0	21	60th
2017	NASCAR K&N Pro Series East	Bassett Racing	14	1	8	11	518	**3rd**
2018	NASCAR K&N Pro Series East	Bassett Racing	12	0	3	9	487	4th
2019	NASCAR Xfinity Series	DGM Racing	12	0	0	0	151	35th
2020	NASCAR Xfinity Series	DGM Racing	5	0	0	0	53	50th
2021	NASCAR Xfinity Series	Bassett Racing	0	0	0	0	25	59th
2021	NASCAR Xfinity Series	DGM Racing	2	0	0	0	25	59th
2022	NASCAR Xfinity Series	Bassett Racing	2	0	0	0	10	65th
2023	CARS Late Model Stock Car Tour	Bassett Racing	16	0	5	7	322	7th
2024	CARS Late Model Stock Car Tour	Bassett Racing	16	1	1	4	265	9th
2025	CARS Late Model Stock Car Tour	Bassett Racing	15	0	3	5	420	10th
2026	CARS Late Model Stock Car Tour	Bassett Racing	13	0	2	5	353	11th

=== NASCAR ===
(key) (Bold – Pole position awarded by qualifying time. Italics – Pole position earned by points standings or practice time. * – Most laps led.)

==== Xfinity Series ====
NASCAR Xfinity Series results
Year	Team	No.	Make	1	2	3	4	5	6	7	8	9	10	11	12	13	14	15	16	17	18	19	20	21	22	23	24	25	26	27	28	29	30	31	32	33	NXSC	Pts	Ref
2019	DGM Racing	90	Chevy	DAY	ATL	LVS	PHO; 32	CAL	TEX; 15	BRI	RCH	TAL	DOV; 25		POC; 21	MCH	IOW; 24	CHI; 30	DAY	KEN; 29	NHA	IOW	GLN	MOH	BRI; 33	ROA	DAR	IND; 15	LVS	RCH	CLT	DOV	KAN	TEX; 31	PHO; 33	HOM	35th	131	
2019	DGM Racing	92	Chevy											CLT; 25																							35th	131	
2020	DGM Racing	36	Chevy	DAY	LVS	CAL	PHO	DAR; 31	CLT		ATL; 19	HOM	HOM	TAL	POC	IND																					50th	53	
2020	DGM Racing	90	Chevy							BRI; 31							KEN; 19	KEN; 32	TEX	KAN	ROA	DAY	DOV	DOV	DAY	DAR	RCH	RCH	BRI	LVS	TAL	CLT	KAN	TEX	MAR	PHO	50th	53	
2021	Bassett Racing	77	Chevy	DAY; DNQ	DAY; DNQ	HOM; DNQ	LVS	PHO	ATL; DNQ	MAR; DNQ	TAL; DNQ	DAR; DNQ	DOV; DNQ	COA	CLT	MOH																					59th	25	
2021	DGM Racing	90	Chevy														TEX; 22	NSH	POC	ROA	ATL; 27	NHA	GLN	IND	MCH	DAY	DAR	RCH	BRI	LVS	TAL	CLT	TEX	KAN	MAR	PHO	59th	25	
2022	Bassett Racing	77	Chevy	DAY; DNQ	CAL	LVS	PHO	ATL	COA	RCH	MAR; DNQ	TAL	DOV	DAR	TEX	CLT; DNQ	PIR	NSH	ROA	ATL	NHA	POC; 36	IND	MCH	GLN	DAY; DNQ	DAR	KAN	BRI; 28	TEX	TAL	CLT	LVS	HOM	MAR; DNQ	PHO	65th	10	

==== K&N Pro Series East ====
NASCAR K&N Pro Series East results
Year	Team	No.	Make	1	2	3	4	5	6	7	8	9	10	11	12	13	14	15	16	NKNPSEC	Pts	Ref
2013	Bassett Racing	04	Toyota	BRI	GRE	FIF	RCH	BGS	IOW	LGY	COL	IOW	VIR	GRE; 23	NHA; 10	DOV; DNQ	RAL			35th	68	
2014	Bassett Racing	04	Toyota	NSM; 19	DAY; 23	BRI; 23	GRE; 2	RCH; 5	IOW; 8	BGS; 5	FIF; 9	LGY; 20	NHA; 6	COL; 11	IOW; 18		VIR; 17		DOV; 12	11th	491	
2014	Bassett Racing	04	Chevy													GLN; 15		GRE; 20		11th	491	
2015	Bassett Racing	04	Ford	NSM; 16	GRE; 8	BRI; 15	IOW; 2	BGS; 12	LGY; 11	COL; 5	NHA; 25	IOW; 23	GLN	MOT; 19	VIR	RCH; 24	DOV; 28			15th	340	
2016	Bassett Racing	04	Ford	NSM; 3	MOB; 10	GRE; 3	BRI; 19	VIR; 5												15th	286	
2016	Calabrese Motorsports	43	Ford						DOM; 19	STA; 21	COL	NHA	IOW	GLN						15th	286	
2016	Bassett Racing	04	Chevy												GRE; 4	NJM	DOV; 26			15th	286	
2017	Bassett Racing	04	Chevy	NSM; 1	GRE; 2	BRI; 22	SBO; 15	SBO; 14	MEM; 4	BLN; 5	TMP; 3	NHA; 3	IOW; 9		LGY; 4		DOV; 9			3rd	518	
2017	Bassett Racing	04	Toyota											GLN; 6		NJM; 5				3rd	518	
2018	Bassett Racing	04	Toyota	NSM; 8	BRI; 8						TMP; 12					NHA; 9	DOV; 9			4th	487	
2018	Bassett Racing	04	Chevy			LGY; 11	SBO; 6	SBO; 4	MEM; 5	NJM; 3		NHA; 14	IOW; 16	GLN; 10	GTW; 14					4th	487	

==== K&N Pro Series West ====
NASCAR K&N Pro Series West results
Year	Team	No.	Make	1	2	3	4	5	6	7	8	9	10	11	12	13	14	NKNPSWC	Pts	Ref
2015	Bassett Racing	04	Ford	KCR	IRW	TUS	IOW	SHA	SON	SLS	IOW	EVG	CNS	MER	AAS	PHO; 10		49th	34	
2017	Bassett Racing	04	Chevy	KCR	TUS	IRW	IRW	SPO	OSS	CNS	SON	IOW	EVG	DCS	MER	AAS	KCR; 23	60th	21	

=== CARS Late Model Stock Car Tour ===
(key) (Bold – Pole position awarded by qualifying time. Italics – Pole position earned by points standings or practice time. * – Most laps led. ** – All laps led.)

CARS Late Model Stock Car Tour results
Year	Team	No.	Make	1	2	3	4	5	6	7	8	9	10	11	12	13	14	15	16	17	CLMSCTC	Pts	Ref
2023	Bassett Racing	04	Chevy	SNM; 16	FLC; 3	HCY; 26	ACE; 19	NWS; 14	LGY; 18	DOM; 25	CRW; 25	HCY; 6	ACE; 6	TCM; 3	WKS; 3	AAS; 3	SBO; 11	TCM; 23	CRW; 5		7th	322	
2024	Bassett Racing	04	Chevy	SNM; 15	HCY; 18	AAS; 25	OCS; 26	ACE; 6	TCM; 28	LGY; 11	DOM; DNQ	CRW; 9		NWS; 8	ACE; 16	WCS	FLC; 15	SBO; 20	TCM; 20	NWS; 16	9th	265	
2024	Bassett Racing	14	Chevy										HCY; 1								9th	265	
2025	Bassett Racing	04	Chevy	AAS; 3	WCS; 6	CDL; 14	OCS; 5	ACE; 18	NWS; 18	LGY; 6	DOM; 18	CRW; 4		AND; 13	FLC; 16	SBO; 19	TCM; 29	NWS; 28			10th	420	
2025	Bassett Racing	44	Chevy										HCY; 13								10th	420	
2026	Bassett Racing	04	Chevy	SNM; 25	WCS; 19	NSV; 26	CRW; 25	ACE; 9	LGY; 29	DOM	NWS; 22		AND; 7	**FLC**; 7	TCM; 12	**NPS**; 2*	SBO; 11				11th	353	
2026	Bassett Racing	1	Chevy									HCY; 5									11th	353	

^{*} Season still in progress
^{1} Ineligible for series points
