= 2021 Contender Boats 250 =

Race details
- Race 3 of 33 in the 2021 NASCAR Xfinity Series season
- Homestead-Miami Speedway
- Date: February 27, 2021
- Location: Homestead-Miami Speedway in Homestead, Florida
- Course: Permanent racing facility
- Course length: 1.50 miles (2.414 km)
- Distance: 179 laps, 268.5 mi (432.109 km)
- Scheduled distance: 167 laps, 250.5 mi (403.141 km)
- Average speed: 103.72 mph

Pole position
Driver	Austin Cindric	Team Penske
- Grid positions set by competition-based formula

Most laps led
Driver	Austin Cindric	Team Penske
- Laps: 63

Winner
No. 2	Myatt Snider	Richard Childress Racing

Television in the United States
- Network: FS1
- Announcers: Adam Alexander, Kurt Busch, and Aric Almirola

The 2021 Contender Boats 250 was a NASCAR Xfinity Series race held on February 27, 2021. It was contested over 179 laps—extended from 167 laps due to an overtime finish—on the 1.5-mile (2.4 km) oval. It was the third race of the 2021 NASCAR Xfinity Series season. Richard Childress Racing driver Myatt Snider, grabbed his first career Xfinity Series win.

== Background ==
Homestead-Miami Speedway is a motor racing track located in Homestead, Florida. The track, which has several configurations, has promoted several series of racing, including NASCAR, the NTT IndyCar Series and the Grand-Am Rolex Sports Car Series

From 2002 to 2019, Homestead-Miami Speedway has hosted the final race of the season in all three of NASCAR's series: the NASCAR Cup Series, Xfinity Series and Camping World Truck Series.

=== Entry list ===
- (R) denotes rookie driver.
- (i) denotes driver who is ineligible for series driver points.

No.	Driver	Team	Manufacturer
0	Jeffrey Earnhardt	JD Motorsports	Chevrolet
1	Michael Annett	JR Motorsports	Chevrolet
2	Myatt Snider	Richard Childress Racing	Chevrolet
02	Brett Moffitt(I)	Our Motorsports	Chevrolet
4	Landon Cassill	JD Motorsports	Chevrolet
5	Matt Mills	B. J. McLeod Motorsports	Chevrolet
6	Ryan Vargas (R)	JD Motorsports	Chevrolet
7	Justin Allgaier	JR Motorsports	Chevrolet
07	Joe Graf Jr.	SS-Green Light Racing	Chevrolet
8	Josh Berry(R)	JR Motorsports	Chevrolet
9	Noah Gragson	JR Motorsports	Chevrolet
10	Jeb Burton	Kaulig Racing	Chevrolet
11	Justin Haley	Kaulig Racing	Chevrolet
13	David Starr	MBM Motorsports	Ford
15	Colby Howard	JD Motorsports	Chevrolet
16	A. J. Allmendinger	Kaulig Racing	Chevrolet
17	J. J. Yeley	SS-Green Light Racing with Rick Ware Racing	Chevrolet
18	Daniel Hemric	Joe Gibbs Racing	Toyota
19	Brandon Jones	Joe Gibbs Racing	Toyota
20	Harrison Burton	Joe Gibbs Racing	Toyota
22	Austin Cindric	Team Penske	Ford
23	Tyler Reddick	RSS Racing with Reaume Brothers Racing	Chevrolet
26	Santino Ferrucci (R)	Sam Hunt Racing	Toyota
31	Jordan Anderson (I)	Jordan Anderson Racing	Chevrolet
36	Alex Labbé	DGM Racing	Chevrolet
39	Ryan Sieg	RSS Racing	Chevrolet
44	Tommy Joe Martins	Martins Motorsports	Chevrolet
47	Kyle Weatherman	Mike Harmon Racing	Chevrolet
48	Jade Buford (R)	Big Machine Racing Team	Chevrolet
51	Jeremy Clements	Jeremy Clements Racing	Chevrolet
52	Gray Gaulding	Means Racing	Chevrolet
54	Ty Dillon	Joe Gibbs Racing	Toyota
61	Chad Finchum	Hattori Racing Enterprises	Toyota
66	Timmy Hill	MBM Motorsports	Ford
68	Brandon Brown	Brandonbilt Motorsports	Chevrolet
74	Bayley Currey	Mike Harmon Racing	Chevrolet
77	Ronnie Bassett Jr.	Bassett Racing	Chevrolet
78	Jesse Little	B. J. McLeod Motorsports	Chevrolet
90	Dexter Bean	DGM Racing	Chevrolet
92	Josh Williams	DGM Racing	Chevrolet
98	Riley Herbst	Stewart-Haas Racing	Ford
99	Stefan Parsons	B. J. McLeod Motorsports	Chevrolet
Official entry list

== Qualifying ==
Austin Cindric was awarded the pole for the race as determined by competition-based formula. Jordan Anderson and Ronnie Bassett Jr. did not have enough points to qualify for the race.

=== Starting Lineups ===
Pos	No	Driver	Team	Manufacturer
1	22	Austin Cindric	Team Penske	Ford
2	18	Daniel Hemric	Joe Gibbs Racing	Toyota
3	20	Harrison Burton	Joe Gibbs Racing	Toyota
4	19	Brandon Jones	Joe Gibbs Racing	Toyota
5	10	Jeb Burton	Kaulig Racing	Chevrolet
6	02	Brett Moffitt	Our Motorsports	Chevrolet
7	68	Brandon Brown	Brandonbilt Motorsports	Chevrolet
8	11	Justin Haley	Kaulig Racing	Chevrolet
9	51	Jeremy Clements	Jeremy Clements Racing	Chevrolet
10	2	Myatt Snider	Richard Childress Racing	Chevrolet
11	4	Landon Cassill	JD Motorsports	Chevrolet
12	47	Kyle Weatherman	Mike Harmon Racing	Chevrolet
13	54	Ty Dillon	Joe Gibbs Racing	Toyota
14	78	Jesse Little	B. J. McLeod Motorsports	Chevrolet
15	92	Josh Williams	DGM Racing	Chevrolet
16	07	Joe Graf Jr.	SS-Green Light Racing	Chevrolet
17	5	Matt Mills	B. J. McLeod Motorsports	Chevrolet
18	1	Michael Annett	JR Motorsports	Chevrolet
19	7	Justin Allgaier	JR Motorsports	Chevrolet
20	8	Josh Berry (R)	JR Motorsports	Chevrolet
21	26	Santino Ferrucci (R)	Sam Hunt Racing	Toyota
22	39	Ryan Sieg	RSS Racing	Ford
23	9	Noah Gragson	JR Motorsports	Chevrolet
24	16	A. J. Allmendinger	Kaulig Racing	Chevrolet
25	36	Alex Labbé	DGM Racing	Chevrolet
26	52	Gray Gaulding	Means Motorsports	Chevrolet
27	44	Tommy Joe Martins	Martins Motorsports	Chevrolet
28	15	Colby Howard	JD Motorsports	Chevrolet
29	98	Riley Herbst	Stewart-Haas Racing	Ford
30	99	Stefan Parsons	B. J. McLeod Motorsports	Chevrolet
31	48	Jade Buford (R)	Big Machine Racing Team	Chevrolet
32	90	Dexter Bean	DGM Racing	Chevrolet
33	66	Timmy Hill	MBM Motorsports	Ford
34	74	Bayley Currey (I)	Mike Harmon Racing	Chevrolet
35	6	Ryan Vargas (R)	JD Motorsports	Chevrolet
36	0	Jeffrey Earnhardt	JD Motorsports	Chevrolet
37	61	Chad Finchum	Hattori Racing Enterprises	Toyota
38	23	Tyler Reddick (I)	RSS Racing with Reaume Brothers Racing	Chevrolet
39	17	J. J. Yeley	SS-Green Light Racing with Rick Ware Racing	Chevrolet
40	13	David Starr	MBM Motorsports	Ford
Official qualifying results

== Race ==
=== Race results ===
==== Stage Results ====
Stage One Laps: 40

Pos	No	Driver	Team	Manufacturer	Points
1	16	A. J. Allmendinger	Kaulig Racing	Chevrolet	10
2	11	Justin Haley	Kaulig Racing	Chevrolet	9
3	18	Daniel Hemric	Joe Gibbs Racing	Toyota	8
4	20	Harrison Burton	Joe Gibbs Racing	Toyota	7
5	10	Jeb Burton	Kaulig Racing	Chevrolet	6
6	7	Justin Allgaier	JR Motorsports	Chevrolet	5
7	19	Brandon Jones	Joe Gibbs Racing	Toyota	4
8	8	Josh Berry (R)	JR Motorsports	Chevrolet	3
9	1	Michael Annett	JR Motorsports	Chevrolet	2
10	9	Noah Gragson	JR Motorsports	Chevrolet	1

Stage Two Laps: 80

Pos	No	Driver	Team	Manufacturer	Points
1	22	Austin Cindric	Team Penske	Ford	10
2	2	Myatt Snider	Richard Childress Racing	Chevrolet	9
3	9	Noah Gragson	JR Motorsports	Chevrolet	8
4	98	Riley Herbst	Stewart-Haas Racing	Ford	7
5	19	Brandon Jones	Joe Gibbs Racing	Toyota	6
6	51	Jeremy Clements	Jeremy Clements Racing	Chevrolet	5
7	39	Ryan Sieg	RSS Racing	Chevrolet	4
8	16	A. J. Allmendinger	Kaulig Racing	Chevrolet	3
9	10	Jeb Burton	Kaulig Racing	Chevrolet	2
10	4	Landon Cassill	JD Motorsports	Chevrolet	1

=== Final Stage Results ===
Laps: 167

Pos	Grid	No	Driver	Team	Manufacturer	Laps	Points	Status
1	10	2	Myatt Snider	Richard Childress Racing	Chevrolet	179	49	Running
2	4	19	Brandon Jones	Joe Gibbs Racing	Toyota	179	45	Running
3	2	18	Daniel Hemric	Joe Gibbs Racing	Toyota	179	42	Running
4	5	10	Jeb Burton	Kaulig Racing	Chevrolet	179	41	Running
5	1	22	Austin Cindric	Team Penske	Ford	179	42	Running
6	8	11	Justin Haley	Kaulig Racing	Chevrolet	179	40	Running
7	6	02	Brett Moffitt (I)	Our Motorsports	Chevrolet	179	0	Running
8	22	39	Ryan Sieg	RSS Racing	Ford	179	33	Running
9	9	51	Jeremy Clements	Jeremy Clements Racing	Chevrolet	179	33	Running
10	20	8	Josh Berry (R)	JR Motorsports	Chevrolet	179	30	Running
11	29	98	Riley Hersbt	Stewart-Haas Racing	Ford	179	33	Running
12	39	17	J. J. Yeley	SS-Green Light Racing	Chevrolet	179	25	Running
13	18	1	Michael Annett	JR Motorsports	Chevrolet	179	26	Running
14	24	16	A. J. Allmendinger	Kaulig Racing	Chevrolet	179	36	Running
15	25	36	Alex Labbé	DGM Racing	Chevrolet	179	22	Running
16	33	66	Timmy Hill	MBM Motorsports	Toyota	179	21	Running
17	32	90	Dexter Bean	DGM Racing	Chevrolet	179	20	Running
18	27	44	Tommy Joe Martins	Martins Motorsports	Chevrolet	179	19	Running
19	11	4	Landon Cassill	JD Motorsports	Chevrolet	179	19	Running
20	31	48	Jade Buford (R)	Big Machine Racing Team	Chevrolet	179	17	Running
21	40	13	David Starr	MBM Motorsports	Toyota	179	16	Running
22	36	0	Jeffrey Earnhardt	JD Motorsports	Chevrolet	179	15	Running
23	37	61	Chad Finchum	Hattori Racing Enterprises	Toyota	179	14	Running
24	35	6	Ryan Vargas (R)	JD Motorsports	Chevrolet	179	13	Running
25	12	47	Kyle Weatherman	Mike Harmon Racing	Chevrolet	179	12	Running
26	15	92	Josh Williams	DGM Racing	Chevrolet	178	11	Running
27	16	07	Joe Graf Jr.	SS-Green Light Racing	Chevrolet	178	10	Running
28	26	52	Gray Gaulding	Means Motorsports	Chevrolet	178	9	Running
29	17	5	Matt Mills	B. J. McLeod Motorsports	Toyota	178	8	Running
30	21	26	Santino Ferrucci (R)	Sam Hunt Racing	Toyota	177	7	Running
31	30	99	Stefan Parsons	B. J. McLeod Motorsports	Toyota	177	6	Running
32	14	78	Jesse Little	B. J. McLeod Motorsports	Toyota	177	5	Running
33	23	9	Noah Gragson	JR Motorsports	Chevrolet	165	13	Accident
34	7	68	Brandon Brown	Brandonbilt Motorsports	Chevrolet	152	3	Overheating
35	34	74	Bayley Currey	Mike Harmon Racing	Chevrolet	148	2	Power steering
36	28	15	Colby Howard	JD Motorsports	Chevrolet	109	1	Rear gear
37	13	54	Ty Dillon	Joe Gibbs Racing	Toyota	102	1	Radiator
38	19	7	Justin Allgaier	JR Motorsports	Chevrolet	98	6	Crash
39	3	20	Harrison Burton	Joe Gibbs Racing	Toyota	70	8	Engine
40	38	23	Tyler Reddick (I)	RSS-Racing with Reaume Brothers Racing	Chevrolet	179	0	Disqualified
Official race results

=== Race statistics ===
- Lead changes: 20 among 11 different drivers
- Cautions/Laps: 8 for 42
- Time of race: 2 hours, 30 minutes, and 59 seconds
- Average speed: 103.72 mph (166.92 km/h)

Previous race: 2021 Super Start Batteries 188	NASCAR Xfinity Series; 2021 season	Next race: 2021 Alsco Uniforms 300
