= 2020 Alsco 300 (Kentucky) =

NASCAR Xfinity Series race

Race details
- Race 15 of 33 in the 2020 NASCAR Xfinity Series season
- Layout of Kentucky Speedway
- Date: July 10, 2020
- Location: Kentucky Speedway in Sparta, Kentucky
- Course: Permanent racing facility
- Course length: 1.5 miles (2.4 km)
- Distance: 200 laps, 300 mi (482.8 km)

Pole position
| Driver | Myatt Snider | RSS Racing |
- Grid positions set by partial inversion of previous race's finishing order

Most laps led
| Driver | Austin Cindric | Team Penske |
- Laps: 130

Winner
| No. 22 | Austin Cindric | Team Penske |

Television in the United States
- Network: FS1
- Announcers: Adam Alexander, Clint Bowyer, Kurt Busch
- Nielsen ratings: 681,000

Radio in the United States
- Radio: PRN

The 2020 Alsco 300 was a NASCAR Xfinity Series race held on July 10, 2020, at Kentucky Speedway in Sparta, Kentucky. Contested over 200 laps on the 1.5-mile (2.4 km) speedway, it was the 15th race of the 2020 NASCAR Xfinity Series season and the second race in two days at Kentucky. Austin Cindric won at Kentucky for the second straight day.

This was the final Xfinity Series race at Kentucky Speedway, as the track lost its race in 2021.

== Report ==
=== Background ===
Kentucky Speedway is a 1.5-mile (2.4 km) tri-oval speedway in Sparta, Kentucky, which has hosted ARCA, NASCAR and Indy Racing League racing annually since it opened in 2000. The track is currently owned and operated by Speedway Motorsports, Inc. and Jerry Carroll, who, along with four other investors, owned Kentucky Speedway until 2008. The speedway has a grandstand capacity of 117,000. Construction of the speedway began in 1998 and was completed in mid-2000. The speedway has hosted the Gander RV & Outdoors Truck Series, Xfinity Series, IndyCar Series, Indy Lights, and most recently, the NASCAR Cup Series beginning in 2011.

The race was held without fans in attendance due to the ongoing COVID-19 pandemic.

=== Entry list ===
- (R) denotes rookie driver.
- (i) denotes driver who is ineligible for series driver points.

| No. | Driver | Team | Manufacturer |
|---|---|---|---|
| 0 | Jeffrey Earnhardt | JD Motorsports | Chevrolet |
| 1 | Michael Annett | JR Motorsports | Chevrolet |
| 02 | Brett Moffitt (i) | Our Motorsports | Chevrolet |
| 4 | Jesse Little (R) | JD Motorsports | Chevrolet |
| 5 | Matt Mills | B. J. McLeod Motorsports | Toyota |
| 6 | B. J. McLeod | JD Motorsports | Chevrolet |
| 7 | Justin Allgaier | JR Motorsports | Chevrolet |
| 07 | Garrett Smithley | SS-Green Light Racing | Chevrolet |
| 8 | Daniel Hemric | JR Motorsports | Chevrolet |
| 08 | Joe Graf Jr. (R) | SS-Green Light Racing | Chevrolet |
| 9 | Noah Gragson | JR Motorsports | Chevrolet |
| 10 | Ross Chastain | Kaulig Racing | Chevrolet |
| 11 | Justin Haley | Kaulig Racing | Chevrolet |
| 13 | Chad Finchum | MBM Motorsports | Toyota |
| 15 | Colby Howard | JD Motorsports | Chevrolet |
| 18 | Riley Herbst (R) | Joe Gibbs Racing | Toyota |
| 19 | Brandon Jones | Joe Gibbs Racing | Toyota |
| 20 | Harrison Burton (R) | Joe Gibbs Racing | Toyota |
| 21 | Anthony Alfredo | Richard Childress Racing | Chevrolet |
| 22 | Austin Cindric | Team Penske | Ford |
| 36 | Alex Labbé | DGM Racing | Chevrolet |
| 39 | Ryan Sieg | RSS Racing | Chevrolet |
| 44 | Tommy Joe Martins | Martins Motorsports | Chevrolet |
| 47 | Kyle Weatherman | Mike Harmon Racing | Chevrolet |
| 51 | Jeremy Clements | Jeremy Clements Racing | Chevrolet |
| 52 | Kody Vanderwal (R) | Means Racing | Chevrolet |
| 61 | Timmy Hill (i) | Hattori Racing | Toyota |
| 66 | Stephen Leicht | MBM Motorsports | Toyota |
| 68 | Brandon Brown | Brandonbilt Motorsports | Chevrolet |
| 74 | Bayley Currey (i) | Mike Harmon Racing | Chevrolet |
| 78 | Vinnie Miller | B. J. McLeod Motorsports | Chevrolet |
| 90 | Ronnie Bassett Jr. | DGM Racing | Chevrolet |
| 92 | Josh Williams | DGM Racing | Chevrolet |
| 93 | Myatt Snider (R) | RSS Racing | Chevrolet |
| 98 | Chase Briscoe | Stewart-Haas Racing | Ford |
| 99 | Mason Massey | B. J. McLeod Motorsports | Toyota |
Official entry list

== Qualifying ==
Myatt Snider was awarded the pole for the race as determined by the top 15 from Thursday's finishing order inverted.

=== Starting Lineup ===
| Pos | No | Driver | Team | Manufacturer |
|---|---|---|---|---|
| 1 | 93 | Myatt Snider (R) | RSS Racing | Chevrolet |
| 2 | 4 | Jesse Little (R) | JD Motorsports | Chevrolet |
| 3 | 08 | Joe Graf Jr. (R) | SS-Green Light Racing | Chevrolet |
| 4 | 51 | Jeremy Clements | Jeremy Clements Racing | Chevrolet |
| 5 | 9 | Noah Gragson | JR Motorsports | Chevrolet |
| 6 | 02 | Brett Moffitt (i) | Our Motorsports | Chevrolet |
| 7 | 39 | Ryan Sieg | RSS Racing | Chevrolet |
| 8 | 47 | Kyle Weatherman | Mike Harmon Racing | Chevrolet |
| 9 | 11 | Justin Haley | Kaulig Racing | Chevrolet |
| 10 | 21 | Anthony Alfredo | Richard Childress Racing | Chevrolet |
| 11 | 1 | Michael Annett | JR Motorsports | Chevrolet |
| 12 | 98 | Chase Briscoe | Stewart-Haas Racing | Ford |
| 13 | 10 | Ross Chastain | Kaulig Racing | Chevrolet |
| 14 | 18 | Riley Herbst (R) | Joe Gibbs Racing | Toyota |
| 15 | 22 | Austin Cindric | Team Penske | Ford |
| 16 | 13 | Chad Finchum | MBM Motorsports | Toyota |
| 17 | 20 | Harrison Burton (R) | Joe Gibbs Racing | Toyota |
| 18 | 6 | B. J. McLeod | JD Motorsports | Chevrolet |
| 19 | 90 | Ronnie Bassett Jr. | DGM Racing | Chevrolet |
| 20 | 7 | Justin Allgaier | JR Motorsports | Chevrolet |
| 21 | 61 | Timmy Hill (i) | Hattori Racing | Toyota |
| 22 | 74 | Bayley Currey (i) | Mike Harmon Racing | Chevrolet |
| 23 | 78 | Vinnie Miller | B. J. McLeod Motorsports | Chevrolet |
| 24 | 36 | Alex Labbé | DGM Racing | Chevrolet |
| 25 | 52 | Kody Vanderwal (R) | Means Racing | Chevrolet |
| 26 | 92 | Josh Williams | DGM Racing | Chevrolet |
| 27 | 68 | Brandon Brown | Brandonbilt Motorsports | Chevrolet |
| 28 | 99 | Mason Massey | B. J. McLeod Motorsports | Toyota |
| 29 | 0 | Jeffrey Earnhardt | JD Motorsports | Chevrolet |
| 30 | 5 | Matt Mills | B. J. McLeod Motorsports | Toyota |
| 31 | 07 | Garrett Smithley | SS-Green Light Racing | Chevrolet |
| 32 | 15 | Colby Howard | JD Motorsports | Chevrolet |
| 33 | 44 | Tommy Joe Martins | Martins Motorsports | Chevrolet |
| 34 | 8 | Daniel Hemric | JR Motorsports | Chevrolet |
| 35 | 66 | Stephen Leicht | MBM Motorsports | Toyota |
| 36 | 19 | Brandon Jones | Joe Gibbs Racing | Toyota |
Official starting lineup

- The No. 8 of Daniel Hemric had to start from the rear due to a driver change from Thursday's race.
- The No. 7, No. 8, No. 15, No. 19, No. 52, No. 61, No. 68, and No. 90 had to start from the rear after moving to a backup car.
- The No. 44 of Tommy Joe Martins had to start from the rear due to unapproved adjustments.

== Race ==
=== Race results ===
==== Stage Results ====
Stage One

Laps: 45

| Pos | No | Driver | Team | Manufacturer | Points |
|---|---|---|---|---|---|
| 1 | 9 | Noah Gragson | JR Motorsports | Chevrolet | 10 |
| 2 | 20 | Harrison Burton (R) | Joe Gibbs Racing | Toyota | 9 |
| 3 | 22 | Austin Cindric | Team Penske | Ford | 8 |
| 4 | 21 | Anthony Alfredo | Richard Childress Racing | Chevrolet | 7 |
| 5 | 19 | Brandon Jones | Joe Gibbs Racing | Toyota | 6 |
| 6 | 18 | Riley Herbst (R) | Joe Gibbs Racing | Toyota | 5 |
| 7 | 98 | Chase Briscoe | Stewart-Haas Racing | Ford | 4 |
| 8 | 51 | Jeremy Clements | Jeremy Clements Racing | Chevrolet | 3 |
| 9 | 8 | Daniel Hemric | JR Motorsports | Chevrolet | 2 |
| 10 | 10 | Ross Chastain | Kaulig Racing | Chevrolet | 1 |

Stage Two

Laps: 45

| Pos | No | Driver | Team | Manufacturer | Points |
|---|---|---|---|---|---|
| 1 | 22 | Austin Cindric | Team Penske | Ford | 10 |
| 2 | 21 | Anthony Alfredo | Richard Childress Racing | Chevrolet | 9 |
| 3 | 20 | Harrison Burton (R) | Joe Gibbs Racing | Toyota | 8 |
| 4 | 98 | Chase Briscoe | Stewart-Haas Racing | Ford | 7 |
| 5 | 8 | Daniel Hemric | JR Motorsports | Chevrolet | 6 |
| 6 | 18 | Riley Herbst (R) | Joe Gibbs Racing | Toyota | 5 |
| 7 | 19 | Brandon Jones | Joe Gibbs Racing | Toyota | 4 |
| 8 | 9 | Noah Gragson | JR Motorsports | Chevrolet | 3 |
| 9 | 11 | Justin Haley | Kaulig Racing | Chevrolet | 2 |
| 10 | 51 | Jeremy Clements | Jeremy Clements Racing | Chevrolet | 1 |

=== Final Stage Results ===
Laps: 110

| Pos | Grid | No | Driver | Team | Manufacturer | Laps | Points | Status |
|---|---|---|---|---|---|---|---|---|
| 1 | 15 | 22 | Austin Cindric | Team Penske | Ford | 200 | 58 | Running |
| 2 | 12 | 98 | Chase Briscoe | Stewart-Haas Racing | Ford | 200 | 46 | Running |
| 3 | 9 | 11 | Justin Haley | Kaulig Racing | Chevrolet | 200 | 36 | Running |
| 4 | 13 | 10 | Ross Chastain | Kaulig Racing | Chevrolet | 200 | 34 | Running |
| 5 | 20 | 7 | Justin Allgaier | JR Motorsports | Chevrolet | 200 | 32 | Running |
| 6 | 10 | 21 | Anthony Alfredo | Richard Childress Racing | Chevrolet | 200 | 47 | Running |
| 7 | 5 | 9 | Noah Gragson | JR Motorsports | Chevrolet | 200 | 43 | Running |
| 8 | 11 | 1 | Michael Annett | JR Motorsports | Chevrolet | 200 | 29 | Running |
| 9 | 34 | 8 | Daniel Hemric | JR Motorsports | Chevrolet | 200 | 36 | Running |
| 10 | 14 | 18 | Riley Herbst (R) | Joe Gibbs Racing | Toyota | 200 | 37 | Running |
| 11 | 4 | 51 | Jeremy Clements | Jeremy Clements Racing | Chevrolet | 200 | 30 | Running |
| 12 | 17 | 20 | Harrison Burton (R) | Joe Gibbs Racing | Toyota | 200 | 42 | Running |
| 13 | 27 | 68 | Brandon Brown | Brandonbilt Motorsports | Chevrolet | 199 | 24 | Running |
| 14 | 2 | 4 | Jesse Little (R) | JD Motorsports | Chevrolet | 198 | 23 | Running |
| 15 | 26 | 92 | Josh Williams | DGM Racing | Chevrolet | 198 | 22 | Running |
| 16 | 31 | 07 | Garrett Smithley | SS-Green Light Racing | Chevrolet | 198 | 21 | Running |
| 17 | 6 | 02 | Brett Moffitt (i) | Our Motorsports | Chevrolet | 197 | 0 | Running |
| 18 | 29 | 0 | Jeffrey Earnhardt | JD Motorsports | Chevrolet | 197 | 19 | Running |
| 19 | 30 | 5 | Matt Mills | B. J. McLeod Motorsports | Toyota | 197 | 18 | Running |
| 20 | 18 | 6 | B. J. McLeod | JD Motorsports | Chevrolet | 197 | 17 | Running |
| 21 | 32 | 15 | Colby Howard | JD Motorsports | Chevrolet | 197 | 16 | Running |
| 22 | 3 | 08 | Joe Graf Jr. (R) | SS-Green Light Racing | Chevrolet | 197 | 15 | Running |
| 23 | 28 | 99 | Mason Massey | B. J. McLeod Motorsports | Toyota | 196 | 14 | Running |
| 24 | 24 | 36 | Alex Labbé | DGM Racing | Chevrolet | 196 | 13 | Running |
| 25 | 22 | 74 | Bayley Currey (i) | Mike Harmon Racing | Chevrolet | 195 | 0 | Running |
| 26 | 21 | 61 | Timmy Hill (i) | Hattori Racing | Toyota | 194 | 0 | Running |
| 27 | 33 | 44 | Tommy Joe Martins | Martins Motorsports | Chevrolet | 194 | 10 | Running |
| 28 | 23 | 78 | Vinnie Miller | B. J. McLeod Motorsports | Chevrolet | 193 | 9 | Running |
| 29 | 25 | 52 | Kody Vanderwal (R) | Means Racing | Chevrolet | 192 | 8 | Running |
| 30 | 36 | 19 | Brandon Jones | Joe Gibbs Racing | Toyota | 197 | 17 | Accident |
| 31 | 1 | 93 | Myatt Snider (R) | RSS Racing | Chevrolet | 156 | 6 | Accident |
| 32 | 19 | 90 | Ronnie Bassett Jr. | DGM Racing | Chevrolet | 73 | 5 | Vibration |
| 33 | 16 | 13 | Chad Finchum | MBM Motorsports | Toyota | 66 | 4 | Electrical |
| 34 | 35 | 66 | Stephen Leicht | MBM Motorsports | Toyota | 52 | 3 | Fuel Pump |
| 35 | 7 | 39 | Ryan Sieg | RSS Racing | Chevrolet | 22 | 2 | Suspension |
| 36 | 8 | 47 | Kyle Weatherman | Mike Harmon Racing | Chevrolet | 0 | 1 | Accident |
Official race results

=== Race statistics ===
- Lead changes: 8 among 6 different drivers
- Cautions/Laps: 5 for 27
- Red flags: 0
- Time of race: 2 hours, 13 minutes, 25 seconds
- Average speed: 134.916 mph (217.126 km/h)

== Media ==
=== Television ===
The Alsco 300 was carried by FS1 in the United States. Adam Alexander, Stewart-Haas Racing driver Clint Bowyer, and Chip Ganassi Racing driver Kurt Busch called the race from the Fox Sports Studio in Charlotte, with Jamie Little covering pit road.

FS1
| Booth announcers | Pit reporter |
|---|---|
| Lap-by-lap: Adam Alexander Color-commentator: Clint Bowyer Color-commentator: Kurt Busch | Jamie Little |

=== Radio ===
The Performance Racing Network (PRN) called the race for radio, which was simulcast on SiriusXM NASCAR Radio.

== Standings after the race ==
Drivers' Championship standings

| | Pos | Driver | Points |
|---|---|---|---|
| | 1 | Chase Briscoe | 643 |
| | 2 | Noah Gragson | 624 (-19) |
| | 3 | Austin Cindric | 610 (-33) |
| | 4 | Ross Chastain | 583 (-60) |
| | 5 | Justin Haley | 521 (-122) |
| 1 | 6 | Harrison Burton (R) | 492 (-151) |
| 1 | 7 | Justin Allgaier | 491 (-152) |
| | 8 | Michael Annett | 443 (-200) |
| | 9 | Brandon Jones | 401 (-242) |
| 1 | 10 | Riley Herbst (R) | 376 (-267) |
| 1 | 11 | Ryan Sieg | 364 (-279) |
| 1 | 12 | Brandon Brown | 321 (-322) |
Official driver's standings

- Note: Only the first 12 positions are included for the driver standings.
- . – Driver has clinched a position in the NASCAR playoffs.

| Previous race: 2020 Shady Rays 200 | NASCAR Xfinity Series; 2020 season | Next race: 2020 My Bariatric Solutions 300 |
