= 2021 EchoPark 250 =

Race details
- Race 6 of 33 in the 2021 NASCAR Xfinity Series season
- Atlanta Motor Speedway
- Date: March 20, 2021
- Location: Atlanta Motor Speedway in Hampton, Georgia
- Course: Permanent racing facility
- Course length: 1.540 miles (2.47839 km)
- Distance: 163 laps, 251.020 mi (403.977531 km)
- Average speed: 115.117 mph

Pole position
Driver	Austin Cindric	Team Penske
- Grid positions set by competition-based formula

Most laps led
Driver	Martin Truex Jr.	Joe Gibbs Racing
- Laps: 103

Winner
No. 7	Justin Allgaier	JR Motorsports

Television in the United States
- Network: FS1
- Announcers: Adam Alexander, Ryan Blaney, and Tyler Reddick

The 2021 EchoPark 250 was a NASCAR Xfinity Series race held on March 20, 2021. It was contested over 163 laps on the 1.540-mile (2.478 km) oval. It was the sixth race of the 2021 NASCAR Xfinity Series season. JR Motorsports driver Justin Allgaier, collected his first win of the season.

== Report ==
=== Background ===
Atlanta Motor Speedway (formerly Atlanta International Raceway) is a track in Hampton, Georgia, 20 miles (32 km) south of Atlanta. It is a 1.54-mile (2.48 km) quad-oval track with a seating capacity of 111,000. It opened in 1960 as a 1.5-mile (2.4 km) standard oval. In 1994, 46 condominiums were built over the northeastern side of the track. In 1997, to standardize the track with Speedway Motorsports' other two 1.5-mile (2.4 km) ovals, the entire track was almost completely rebuilt. The frontstretch and backstretch were swapped, and the configuration of the track was changed from oval to quad-oval. The project made the track one of the fastest on the NASCAR circuit.

=== Entry list ===
- (R) denotes rookie driver.
- (i) denotes driver who is ineligible for series driver points.

No.	Driver	Team	Manufacturer
0	Jeffrey Earnhardt	JD Motorsports	Chevrolet
1	Michael Annett	JR Motorsports	Chevrolet
2	Myatt Snider	Richard Childress Racing	Chevrolet
02	Brett Moffitt (i)	Our Motorsports	Chevrolet
03	Andy Lally	Our Motorsports	Chevrolet
4	Landon Cassill	JD Motorsports	Chevrolet
5	Matt Mills	B. J. McLeod Motorsports	Chevrolet
6	Ryan Vargas (R)	JD Motorsports	Chevrolet
7	Justin Allgaier	JR Motorsports	Chevrolet
07	Joe Graf Jr.	SS-Green Light Racing	Chevrolet
8	Josh Berry (R)	JR Motorsports	Chevrolet
9	Noah Gragson	JR Motorsports	Chevrolet
10	Jeb Burton	Kaulig Racing	Chevrolet
11	Justin Haley	Kaulig Racing	Chevrolet
13	Chad Finchum	MBM Motorsports	Chevrolet
15	Colby Howard	JD Motorsports	Chevrolet
16	A. J. Allmendinger	Kaulig Racing	Chevrolet
17	Cody Ware	SS-Green Light Racing with Rick Ware Racing	Chevrolet
18	Daniel Hemric	Joe Gibbs Racing	Toyota
19	Brandon Jones	Joe Gibbs Racing	Toyota
20	Harrison Burton	Joe Gibbs Racing	Toyota
22	Austin Cindric	Team Penske	Ford
23	Blaine Perkins	Our Motorsports	Chevrolet
26	Santino Ferrucci	Sam Hunt Racing	Toyota
31	Jordan Anderson (i)	Jordan Anderson Racing	Chevrolet
36	Alex Labbé	DGM Racing	Chevrolet
39	Ryan Sieg	RSS Racing	Chevrolet
44	Tommy Joe Martins	Martins Motorsports	Chevrolet
47	Kyle Weatherman	Mike Harmon Racing	Chevrolet
48	Jade Buford (R)	Big Machine Racing Team	Chevrolet
51	Jeremy Clements	Jeremy Clements Racing	Chevrolet
52	Gray Gaulding	Means Racing	Chevrolet
54	Martin Truex Jr. (i)	Joe Gibbs Racing	Toyota
61	David Starr	Hattori Racing Enterprises	Toyota
66	Timmy Hill	MBM Motorsports	Toyota
68	Brandon Brown	Brandonbilt Motorsports	Chevrolet
74	Bayley Currey	Mike Harmon Racing	Chevrolet
77	Ronnie Bassett Jr.	Bassett Racing	Chevrolet
78	Jesse Little	B. J. McLeod Motorsports	Toyota
90	Dexter Bean	DGM Racing	Chevrolet
92	Josh Williams	DGM Racing	Chevrolet
98	Riley Herbst	Stewart-Haas Racing	Ford
99	Mason Massey	B. J. McLeod Motorsports	Toyota
Official entry list

== Qualifying ==
Austin Cindric was awarded the pole for the race as determined by competition-based formula. Jordan Anderson, Ronnie Bassett Jr., and Andy Lally did not have enough points to qualify for the race.

=== Starting Lineups ===
Pos	No	Driver	Team	Manufacturer
1	22	Austin Cindric	Team Penske	Ford
2	10	Jeb Burton	Kaulig Racing	Chevrolet
3	16	A. J. Allmendinger	Kaulig Racing	Chevrolet
4	68	Brandon Brown	Brandonbilt Motorsports	Chevrolet
5	20	Harrison Burton	Joe Gibbs Racing	Toyota
6	7	Justin Allgaier	JR Motorsports	Chevrolet
7	98	Riley Herbst	Stewart-Haas Racing	Ford
8	02	Brett Moffitt (i)	Our Motorsports	Chevrolet
9	2	Myatt Snider	Richard Childress Racing	Chevrolet
10	51	Jeremy Clements	Jeremy Clements Racing	Chevrolet
11	18	Daniel Hemric	Joe Gibbs Racing	Toyota
12	26	Santino Ferrucci	Sam Hunt Racing	Toyota
13	11	Justin Haley	Kaulig Racing	Chevrolet
14	74	Bayley Currey	Mike Harmon Racing	Chevrolet
15	44	Tommy Joe Martins	Martins Motorsports	Chevrolet
16	19	Brandon Jones	Joe Gibbs Racing	Toyota
17	66	Timmy Hill	MBM Motorsports	Toyota
18	54	Martin Truex Jr. (i)	Joe Gibbs Racing	Toyota
19	92	Josh Williams	DGM Racing	Chevrolet
20	4	Landon Cassill	JD Motorsports	Chevrolet
21	48	Jade Buford (R)	Big Machine Racing Team	Chevrolet
22	8	Josh Berry (R)	JR Motorsports	Chevrolet
23	15	Colby Howard	JD Motorsports	Chevrolet
24	07	Joe Graf Jr.	SS-Green Light Racing	Chevrolet
25	23	Blaine Perkins	Our Motorsports	Chevrolet
26	0	Jeffrey Earnhardt	JD Motorsports	Chevrolet
27	1	Michael Annett	JR Motorsports	Chevrolet
28	17	Cody Ware	SS-Green Light Racing with Rick Ware Racing	Chevrolet
29	90	Dexter Bean	DGM Racing	Chevrolet
30	9	Noah Gragson	JR Motorsports	Chevrolet
31	47	Kyle Weatherman	Mike Harmon Racing	Chevrolet
32	99	Mason Massey	B. J. McLeod Motorsports	Toyota
33	52	Gray Gaulding	Means Motorsports	Chevrolet
34	6	Ryan Vargas	JD Motorsports	Chevrolet
35	39	Ryan Sieg	RSS Racing	Ford
36	36	Alex Labbé	DGM Racing	Chevrolet
37	78	Jesse Little	B. J. McLeod Motorsports	Chevrolet
38	61	David Starr	Hattori Racing Enterprises	Toyota
39	5	Matt Mills	B. J. McLeod Motorsports	Chevrolet
40	13	Chad Finchum	MBM Motorsports	Chevrolet
Official qualifying results

== Race ==
=== Race results ===
==== Stage Results ====
Stage One Laps: 40

Pos	No	Driver	Team	Manufacturer	Points
1	54	Martin Truex Jr. (i)	Joe Gibbs Racing	Toyota	0
2	20	Harrison Burton	Joe Gibbs Racing	Toyota	9
3	7	Justin Alligaier	JR Motorsports	Chevrolet	8
4	11	Justin Haley	Kaulig Racing	Chevrolet	7
5	1	Michael Annett	JR Motorspors	Chevrolet	6
6	22	Austin Cindric	Team Penske	Ford	5
7	51	Jeremy Clements	Jeremy Clements Racing	Chevrolet	4
8	8	Josh Berry (R)	JR Motorsports	Chevrolet	3
9	18	Daniel Hemric	Joe Gibbs Racing	Toyota	2
10	15	Colby Howard	JD Motorsports	Chevrolet	1

Stage Two Laps: 40

Pos	No	Driver	Team	Manufacturer	Points
1	54	Martin Truex Jr. (i)	Joe Gibbs Racing	Toyota	0
2	7	Justin Allgaier	JR Motorsports	Chevrolet	9
3	11	Justin Haley	Kaulig Racing	Chevrolet	8
4	20	Harrison Burton	Joe Gibbs Racing	Toyota	7
5	98	Riley Herbst	Stewart-Haas Racing	Ford	6
6	1	Michael Annett	JR Motorsports	Chevrolet	5
7	2	Myatt Snider	Richard Childress Racing	Chevrolet	4
8	10	Jeb Burton	Kaulig Racing	Chevrolet	3
9	51	Jeremy Clements	Jeremy Clements Racing	Chevrolet	2
10	68	Brandon Brown	Brandonbilt Motorsports	Chevrolet	1

=== Final Stage Results ===
Laps: 83

Pos	Grid	No	Driver	Team	Manufacturer	Laps	Points	Status
1	6	7	Justin Allgaier	JR Motorsports	Chevrolet	163	57	Running
2	18	54	Martin Truex Jr. (i)	Joe Gibbs Racing	Toyota	163	0	Running
3	5	20	Harrison Burton	Joe Gibbs Racing	Toyota	163	50	Running
4	30	9	Noah Gragson	JR Motorsports	Chevrolet	163	33	Running
5	3	16	A. J. Allmendinger	Kaulig Racing	Chevrolet	163	32	Running
6	7	98	Riley Herbst	Stewart-Haas Racing	Ford	163	37	Running
7	27	1	Michael Annett	JR Motorsports	Chevrolet	163	41	Running
8	13	7	Justin Haley	Kaulig Racing	Chevrolet	163	44	Running
9	11	18	Daniel Hemric	Joe Gibbs Racing	Toyota	163	30	Running
10	35	39	Ryan Sieg	Rss Racing	Ford	163	27	Running
11	9	2	Myatt Snider	Richard Childress Racing	Chevrolet	163	30	Running
12	10	51	Jeremy Clements	Jeremy Clements Racing	Chevrolet	163	31	Running
13	1	22	Austin Cindric	Team Penske	Ford	163	29	Running
14	20	4	Landon Cassill	JD Motorsports	Ford	163	23	Running
15	12	26	Santino Ferrucci	Sam Hunt Racing	Toyota	163	22	Running
16	19	92	Josh Williams	DGM Racing	Chevrolet	163	21	Running
17	36	36	Alex Labbé	DGM Racing	Chevrolet	163	20	Running
18	15	44	Tommy Joe Martins	Martins Motorsports	Chevrolet	163	19	Running
19	26	0	Jeffrey Earnhardt	JD Motorsports	Chevrolet	163	18	Running
20	17	66	Timmy Hill	MBM Motorsports	Toyota	163	17	Running
21	23	15	Colby Howard	JD Motorsports	Chevrolet	163	17	Running
22	37	78	Jesse Little	B. J. McLeod Motorsports	Chevrolet	162	15	Running
23	28	17	Cody Ware	SS-Green Light with Rick Ware Racing	Chevrolet	162	14	Running
24	14	74	Bayley Currey	Mike Harmon Racing	Chevrolet	162	13	Running
25	2	10	Jeb Burton	Kaulig Racing	Chevrolet	162	15	Running
26	21	48	Jade Buford (R)	Big Machine Racing Team	Chevrolet	161	11	Running
27	38	61	David Starr	Hattori Racing Enterprises	Toyota	161	10	Running
28	31	47	Kyle Weatherman	Mike Harmon Racing	Chevrolet	161	9	Running
29	24	07	Joe Graf Jr.	SS-Green Light Racing	Chevrolet	161	8	Running
30	25	23	Blaine Perkins	Our Motorsports	Chevrolet	160	7	Running
31	34	6	Ryan Vargas (R)	JD Motorsports	Chevrolet	160	6	Running
32	32	99	Mason Massey	B. J. McLeod Motorsports	Toyota	160	5	Running
33	4	68	Brandon Brown	Brandonbilt Motorsports	Chevrolet	160	5	Running
34	39	5	Matt Mills	B. J. McLeod Motorsports	Chevrolet	156	3	Running
35	29	90	Dexter Bean	DGM Racing	Chevrolet	156	2	Running
36	33	52	Gray Gaulding	Means Motorsports	Chevrolet	146	4	Accident
37	16	19	Brandon Jones	Joe Gibbs Racing	Toyota	132	1	Running
38	22	8	Josh Berry (R)	JR Motorsports	Chevrolet	130	4	Accident
39	40	13	Chad Finchum	MBM Motorsports	Chevrolet	59	1	Brakes
40	8	02	Brett Moffitt (i)	Our Motorsports	Chevrolet	39	0	Accident
Official race results

=== Race statistics ===
- Lead changes: 6 among 5 different drivers
- Cautions/Laps: 7 for 37
- Time of race: 2 hours, 10 minutes, and 5 seconds
- Average speed: 115.117 mph (185.263 km/h)

Previous race: 2021 Call 811 Before You Dig 200	NASCAR Xfinity Series; 2021 season	Next race: 2021 Cook Out 250
