= 2019 iK9 Service Dog 200 =

Race details
- Race 4 of 33 in the 2019 NASCAR Xfinity Series season
- Date: March 9, 2019
- Location: ISM Raceway in Avondale, Arizona
- Course: Permanent racing facility
- Course length: 1 miles (1.6 km)
- Distance: 200 laps, 200 mi (320 km)

Pole position
Driver	Christopher Bell	Joe Gibbs Racing
- Time: 26.871

Most laps led
Driver	Kyle Busch	Joe Gibbs Racing
- Laps: 116

Winner
No. 18	Kyle Busch	Joe Gibbs Racing

Television in the United States
- Network: FS1

Radio in the United States
- Radio: MRN

The 2019 iK9 Service Dog 200 was a NASCAR Xfinity Series race held on March 9, 2019, at ISM Raceway in Avondale, Arizona. Contested over 200 laps on the one-mile (1.6 km) oval, it was the fourth race of the 2019 NASCAR Xfinity Series season.

== Entry list ==
No.	Driver	Team	Manufacturer
00	Cole Custer	Stewart-Haas Racing with Biagi-DenBeste Racing	Ford
0	Garrett Smithley	JD Motorsports	Chevrolet
01	Stephen Leicht	JD Motorsports	Chevrolet
1	Michael Annett	JR Motorsports	Chevrolet
2	Tyler Reddick	Richard Childress Racing	Chevrolet
4	Ross Chastain	JD Motorsports	Chevrolet
5	Matt Mills (R)	B. J. McLeod Motorsports	Chevrolet
07	Ray Black Jr.	SS-Green Light Racing	Chevrolet
7	Justin Allgaier	JR Motorsports	Chevrolet
08	Gray Gaulding (R)	SS-Green Light Racing	Chevrolet
8	Ryan Truex	JR Motorsports	Chevrolet
9	Noah Gragson (R)	JR Motorsports	Chevrolet
11	Justin Haley (R)	Kaulig Racing	Chevrolet
13	Stan Mullis	MBM Motorsports	Toyota
15	B. J. McLeod	JD Motorsports	Chevrolet
17	Bayley Currey (i)	Rick Ware Racing	Chevrolet
18	Kyle Busch (i)	Joe Gibbs Racing	Toyota
19	Brandon Jones	Joe Gibbs Racing	Toyota
20	Christopher Bell	Joe Gibbs Racing	Toyota
22	Austin Cindric	Team Penske	Ford
23	John Hunter Nemechek (R)	GMS Racing	Chevrolet
35	Joey Gase	MBM Motorsports	Toyota
36	Josh Williams	DGM Racing	Chevrolet
38	Jeff Green	RSS Racing	Chevrolet
39	Ryan Sieg	RSS Racing	Chevrolet
42	Chad Finchum	MBM Motorsports	Toyota
51	Jeremy Clements	Jeremy Clements Racing	Chevrolet
52	David Starr	Jimmy Means Racing	Chevrolet
66	Tyler Hill (i)	MBM Motorsports	Toyota
74	Mike Harmon	Mike Harmon Racing	Chevrolet
78	Vinnie Miller	B. J. McLeod Motorsports	Chevrolet
86	Brandon Brown (R)	Brandonbilt Motorsports	Chevrolet
89	Morgan Shepherd	Shepherd Racing Ventures	Chevrolet
90	Ronnie Bassett Jr.	DGM Racing	Chevrolet
93	Josh Bilicki	RSS Racing	Chevrolet
98	Chase Briscoe (R)	Stewart-Haas Racing with Biagi-DenBeste Racing	Ford
99	Tommy Joe Martins	B. J. McLeod Motorsports	Toyota

== Practice ==
=== First practice ===
Kyle Busch was the fastest in the first practice session with a time of 27.289 seconds and a speed of 131.921 mph (212.306 km/h).

Pos	No.	Driver	Team	Manufacturer	Time	Speed
1	18	Kyle Busch (i)	Joe Gibbs Racing	Toyota	27.289	131.921
2	20	Christopher Bell	Joe Gibbs Racing	Toyota	27.360	131.579
3	00	Cole Custer	Stewart-Haas Racing with Biagi-DenBeste Racing	Ford	27.450	131.148

=== Final practice ===
Austin Cindric was the fastest in the final practice session with a time of 27.246 seconds and a speed of 132.129 mph (212.641 km/h).

Pos	No.	Driver	Team	Manufacturer	Time	Speed
1	22	Austin Cindric	Team Penske	Ford	27.246	132.129
2	20	Christopher Bell	Joe Gibbs Racing	Toyota	27.316	131.791
3	23	John Hunter Nemechek (R)	GMS Racing	Chevrolet	27.364	131.560

== Qualifying ==
Christopher Bell scored the pole for the race with a time of 26.871 seconds and a speed of 133.973 mph (215.609 km/h).

=== Qualifying results ===
Pos	No	Driver	Team	Manufacturer	R1	R2	R3
1	20	Christopher Bell	Joe Gibbs Racing	Toyota	27.062	26.796	26.871
2	2	Tyler Reddick	Richard Childress Racing	Chevrolet	27.298	27.085	26.892
3	18	Kyle Busch (i)	Joe Gibbs Racing	Toyota	27.386	27.039	26.991
4	00	Cole Custer	Stewart-Haas Racing with Biagi-DenBeste Racing	Ford	27.361	27.100	27.035
5	1	Michael Annett	JR Motorsports	Chevrolet	27.600	27.017	27.084
6	9	Noah Gragson (R)	JR Motorsports	Chevrolet	27.430	27.162	27.111
7	7	Justin Allgaier	JR Motorsports	Chevrolet	27.634	27.272	27.118
8	22	Austin Cindric	Team Penske	Ford	27.496	27.122	27.129
9	8	Ryan Truex	JR Motorsports	Chevrolet	28.000	27.251	27.138
10	11	Justin Haley (R)	Kaulig Racing	Chevrolet	27.706	27.189	27.227
11	19	Brandon Jones	Joe Gibbs Racing	Toyota	27.831	27.283	27.301
12	98	Chase Briscoe (R)	Stewart-Haas Racing with Biagi-DenBeste Racing	Ford	27.406	27.252	27.366
13	23	John Hunter Nemechek (R)	GMS Racing	Chevrolet	27.704	27.293	—
14	51	Jeremy Clements	Jeremy Clements Racing	Chevrolet	27.523	27.386	—
15	39	Ryan Sieg	RSS Racing	Chevrolet	27.770	27.433	—
16	4	Ross Chastain	JD Motorsports	Chevrolet	27.978	27.459	—
17	08	Gray Gaulding (R)	SS-Green Light Racing	Chevrolet	27.783	27.548	—
18	07	Ray Black Jr.	SS-Green Light Racing	Chevrolet	27.646	27.639	—
19	86	Brandon Brown (R)	Brandonbilt Motorsports	Chevrolet	27.901	27.833	—
20	42	Chad Finchum	MBM Motorsports	Toyota	27.994	27.911	—
21	35	Joey Gase	MBM Motorsports	Toyota	27.824	27.926	—
22	93	Josh Bilicki	RSS Racing	Chevrolet	28.030	28.145	—
23	38	Jeff Green	RSS Racing	Chevrolet	28.066	0.000	—
24	17	Bayley Currey (i)	Rick Ware Racing	Chevrolet	28.076	0.000	—
25	15	B. J. McLeod	JD Motorsports	Chevrolet	28.135	—	—
26	01	Stephen Leicht	JD Motorsports	Chevrolet	28.159	—	—
27	66	Tyler Hill (i)	MBM Motorsports	Toyota	28.164	—	—
28	0	Garrett Smithley	JD Motorsports	Chevrolet	28.285	—	—
29	99	Tommy Joe Martins	B. J. McLeod Motorsports	Toyota	28.292	—	—
30	52	David Starr	Jimmy Means Racing	Chevrolet	28.409	—	—
31	5	Matt Mills (R)	B. J. McLeod Motorsports	Chevrolet	28.432	—	—
32	36	Josh Williams	DGM Racing	Chevrolet	28.465	—	—
33	89	Morgan Shepherd	Shepherd Racing Ventures	Chevrolet	28.632	—	—
34	78	Vinnie Miller	B. J. McLeod Motorsports	Chevrolet	28.641	—	—
35	74	Mike Harmon	Mike Harmon Racing	Chevrolet	28.994	—	—
36	90	Ronnie Bassett Jr.	DGM Racing	Chevrolet	29.030	—	—
37	13	Stan Mullis	MBM Motorsports	Toyota	30.519	—	—

== Race ==
=== Stage Results ===
Stage One Laps: 45

Pos	No	Driver	Team	Manufacturer	Points
1	22	Austin Cindric	Team Penske	Ford	10
2	20	Christopher Bell	Joe Gibbs Racing	Toyota	9
3	18	Kyle Busch (i)	Joe Gibbs Racing	Toyota	0
4	1	Michael Annett	JR Motorsports	Chevrolet	7
5	2	Tyler Reddick	Richard Childress Racing	Chevrolet	6
6	23	John Hunter Nemechek (R)	GMS Racing	Chevrolet	5
7	9	Noah Gragson (R)	JR Motorsports	Chevrolet	4
8	8	Ryan Truex	JR Motorsports	Chevrolet	3
9	7	Justin Allgaier	JR Motorsports	Chevrolet	2
10	11	Justin Haley (R)	Kaulig Racing	Chevrolet	1

Stage Two Laps: 45

Pos	No	Driver	Team	Manufacturer	Points
1	20	Christopher Bell	Joe Gibbs Racing	Toyota	10
2	18	Kyle Busch (i)	Joe Gibbs Racing	Toyota	0
3	2	Tyler Reddick	Richard Childress Racing	Chevrolet	8
4	7	Justin Allgaier	JR Motorsports	Chevrolet	7
5	9	Noah Gragson (R)	JR Motorsports	Chevrolet	6
6	22	Austin Cindric	Team Penske	Ford	5
7	00	Cole Custer	Stewart-Haas Racing with Biagi-DenBeste	Ford	4
8	39	Ryan Sieg	RSS Racing	Chevrolet	3
9	8	Ryan Truex	JR Motorsports	Chevrolet	2
10	11	Justin Haley (R)	Kaulig Racing	Chevrolet	1

=== Final Stage Results ===
Stage Three Laps: 110

Pos	Grid	No	Driver	Team	Manufacturer	Laps	Points
1	3	18	Kyle Busch (i)	Joe Gibbs Racing	Toyota	200	0
2	9	8	Ryan Truex	JR Motorsports	Chevrolet	200	40
3	2	2	Tyler Reddick	Richard Childress Racing	Chevrolet	200	48
4	4	00	Cole Custer	Stewart-Haas Racing with Biagi-DenBeste	Ford	200	37
5	8	22	Austin Cindric	Team Penske	Ford	200	47
6	12	98	Chase Briscoe (R)	Stewart-Haas Racing with Biagi-DenBeste	Ford	200	31
7	11	19	Brandon Jones	Joe Gibbs Racing	Toyota	200	30
8	5	1	Michael Annett	JR Motorsports	Chevrolet	200	36
9	13	23	John Hunter Nemechek (R)	GMS Racing	Chevrolet	200	33
10	15	39	Ryan Sieg	RSS Racing	Chevrolet	200	30
11	6	9	Noah Gragson (R)	JR Motorsports	Chevrolet	200	36
12	10	11	Justin Haley (R)	Kaulig Racing	Chevrolet	200	27
13	14	51	Jeremy Clements	Jeremy Clements Racing	Chevrolet	200	24
14	7	7	Justin Allgaier	JR Motorsports	Chevrolet	199	32
15	19	86	Brandon Brown (R)	Brandonbilt Motorsports	Chevrolet	199	22
16	17	08	Gray Gaulding	SS-Green Light Racing	Chevrolet	199	21
17	16	4	Ross Chastain	JD Motorsports	Chevrolet	199	20
18	18	07	Ray Black Jr.	SS-Green Light Racing	Chevrolet	199	19
19	20	42	Chad Finchum	MBM Motorsports	Toyota	197	18
20	27	66	Tyler Hill (i)	MBM Motorsports	Toyota	197	0
21	25	15	B. J. McLeod	JD Motorsports	Chevrolet	196	16
22	28	0	Garrett Smithley	JD Motorsports	Chevrolet	196	15
23	34	78	Vinnie Miller	B. J. McLeod Motorsports	Chevrolet	196	14
24	21	35	Joey Gase	MBM Motorsports	Toyota	195	13
25	35	74	Mike Harmon	Mike Harmon Racing	Chevrolet	192	12
26	22	93	Josh Bilicki	RSS Racing	Chevrolet	189	11
27	30	52	David Starr	Jimmy Means Racing	Chevrolet	188	10
28	31	5	Matt Mills (R)	B. J. McLeod Motorsports	Chevrolet	182	9
29	32	36	Josh Williams	DGM Racing	Chevrolet	173	8
30	1	20	Christopher Bell	Joe Gibbs Racing	Toyota	130	26
31	26	01	Stephen Leicht	JD Motorsports	Chevrolet	129	6
32	36	90	Ronnie Bassett Jr.	DGM Racing	Chevrolet	61	5
33	23	38	Jeff Green	RSS Racing	Chevrolet	59	4
34	33	89	Morgan Shepherd	Shepherd Racing Ventures	Chevrolet	56	3
35	29	99	Tommy Joe Martins	B. J. McLeod Motorsports	Chevrolet	49	2
36	37	13	Stan Mullis	MBM Motorsports	Toyota	35	1
37	24	17	Bayley Currey (i)	Rick Ware Racing	Chevrolet	30	0

Previous race: 2019 Boyd Gaming 300	NASCAR Xfinity Series; 2019 season	Next race: 2019 Production Alliance Group 300
