= 2021 Drydene 200 =

Race details
- Race 10 of 33 in the 2021 NASCAR Xfinity Series season
- Date: May 15, 2021
- Location: Dover International Speedway in Dover, Delaware
- Course: Permanent racing facility
- Course length: 1.000 miles (1.609 km)
- Distance: 200 laps, 200.000 mi (321.869 km)
- Average speed: 94.987 mph

Pole position
| Driver | Daniel Hemric | Joe Gibbs Racing |
- Grid positions set by competition-based formula

Most laps led
| Driver | Justin Allgaier | JR Motorsports |
- Laps: 94

Winner
| No. 22 | Austin Cindric | Team Penske |

Television in the United States
- Network: FS1
- Announcers: Adam Alexander, Kurt Busch, and Brad Keselowski

The 2021 Drydene 200 was a NASCAR Xfinity Series race held on May 15, 2021. It was contested over 200 laps on the 1.000-mile (1.609 km) Dover International Speedway concrete oval. It was the tenth race of the 2021 NASCAR Xfinity Series season. Team Penske driver Austin Cindric, collected his third win of the season.

== Report ==
=== Background ===
Dover International Speedway is an oval race track in Dover, Delaware, United States that has held at least two NASCAR races since it opened in 1969. In addition to NASCAR, the track also hosted USAC and the NTT IndyCar Series. The track features one layout, a 1 mile (1.6 km) concrete oval, with 24° banking in the turns and 9° banking on the straights. The speedway is owned and operated by Dover Motorsports.

The track, nicknamed "The Monster Mile", was built in 1969 by Melvin Joseph of Melvin L. Joseph Construction Company, Inc., with an asphalt surface, but was replaced with concrete in 1995. Six years later in 2001, the track's capacity moved to 135,000 seats, making the track have the largest capacity of sports venue in the mid-Atlantic. In 2002, the name changed to Dover International Speedway from Dover Downs International Speedway after Dover Downs Gaming and Entertainment split, making Dover Motorsports. From 2007 to 2009, the speedway worked on an improvement project called "The Monster Makeover", which expanded facilities at the track and beautified the track. After the 2014 season, the track's capacity was reduced to 95,500 seats.

=== Entry list ===
- (R) denotes rookie driver.
- (i) denotes driver who is ineligible for series driver points.

| No. | Driver | Team | Manufacturer |
|---|---|---|---|
| 0 | Jeffrey Earnhardt | JD Motorsports | Chevrolet |
| 1 | Michael Annett | JR Motorsports | Chevrolet |
| 2 | Myatt Snider | Richard Childress Racing | Chevrolet |
| 02 | Brett Moffitt | Our Motorsports | Chevrolet |
| 03 | Andy Lally | Our Motorsports | Chevrolet |
| 4 | Ryan Vargas (R) | JD Motorsports | Chevrolet |
| 5 | Matt Mills | B. J. McLeod Motorsports | Chevrolet |
| 6 | Landon Cassill | JD Motorsports | Chevrolet |
| 7 | Justin Allgaier | JR Motorsports | Chevrolet |
| 07 | Joe Graf Jr. | SS-Green Light Racing | Chevrolet |
| 8 | Josh Berry (R) | JR Motorsports | Chevrolet |
| 9 | Noah Gragson | JR Motorsports | Chevrolet |
| 10 | Jeb Burton | Kaulig Racing | Chevrolet |
| 11 | Zane Smith (i) | Kaulig Racing | Chevrolet |
| 13 | Matt Jaskol | MBM Motorsports | Toyota |
| 15 | Colby Howard | JD Motorsports | Chevrolet |
| 16 | A. J. Allmendinger | Kaulig Racing | Chevrolet |
| 17 | Cody Ware | SS-Green Light Racing with Rick Ware Racing | Chevrolet |
| 18 | Daniel Hemric | Joe Gibbs Racing | Toyota |
| 19 | Brandon Jones | Joe Gibbs Racing | Toyota |
| 20 | Harrison Burton | Joe Gibbs Racing | Toyota |
| 22 | Austin Cindric | Team Penske | Ford |
| 23 | J. J. Yeley | Our Motorsports | Chevrolet |
| 26 | John Hunter Nemechek (i) | Sam Hunt Racing | Toyota |
| 31 | Jordan Anderson (I) | Jordan Anderson Racing | Chevrolet |
| 36 | Alex Labbé | DGM Racing | Chevrolet |
| 39 | Ryan Sieg | RSS Racing | Ford |
| 44 | Tommy Joe Martins | Martins Motorsports | Chevrolet |
| 47 | Kyle Weatherman | Mike Harmon Racing | Chevrolet |
| 48 | Jade Buford (R) | Big Machine Racing Team | Chevrolet |
| 51 | Jeremy Clements | Jeremy Clements Racing | Chevrolet |
| 52 | Gray Gaulding | Means Racing | Chevrolet |
| 54 | Ty Gibbs (R) | Joe Gibbs Racing | Toyota |
| 61 | David Starr | Hattori Racing Enterprises | Toyota |
| 66 | Timmy Hill (i) | MBM Motorsports | Toyota |
| 68 | Brandon Brown | Brandonbilt Motorsports | Chevrolet |
| 74 | Bayley Currey (i) | Mike Harmon Racing | Chevrolet |
| 77 | Ronnie Bassett Jr. | Bassett Racing | Chevrolet |
| 78 | Jesse Little | B. J. McLeod Motorsports | Chevrolet |
| 90 | Kyle Sieg | DGM Racing | Ford |
| 92 | Josh Williams | DGM Racing | Chevrolet |
| 98 | Riley Herbst | Stewart-Haas Racing | Ford |
| 99 | B. J. McLeod (i) | B. J. McLeod Motorsports | Toyota |
Official entry list

== Qualifying ==
Daniel Hemric was awarded the pole for the race as determined by competition-based formula. Jordan Anderson, Ronnie Bassett Jr., and Andy Lally did not have enough points to qualify for the race.

=== Starting Lineups ===
| Pos | No | Driver | Team | Manufacturer |
|---|---|---|---|---|
| 1 | 18 | Daniel Hemric | Joe Gibbs Racing | Toyota |
| 2 | 7 | Justin Allgaier | JR Motorsports | Chevrolet |
| 3 | 9 | Noah Gragson | JR Motorsports | Chevrolet |
| 4 | 19 | Brandon Jones | Joe Gibbs Racing | Toyota |
| 5 | 20 | Harrison Burton | Joe Gibbs Racing | Toyota |
| 6 | 8 | Josh Berry (R) | JR Motorsports | Chevrolet |
| 7 | 16 | A. J. Allmendinger | Kaulig Racing | Chevrolet |
| 8 | 51 | Jeremy Clements | Jeremy Clements Racing | Chevrolet |
| 9 | 11 | Zane Smith | Kaulig Racing | Chevrolet |
| 10 | 02 | Brett Moffitt | Our Motorsports | Chevrolet |
| 11 | 1 | Michael Annett | JR Motorsports | Chevrolet |
| 12 | 39 | Ryan Sieg | RSS Racing | Ford |
| 13 | 10 | Jeb Burton | Kaulig Racing | Chevrolet |
| 14 | 54 | Ty Gibbs (R) | Joe Gibbs Racing | Toyota |
| 15 | 2 | Myatt Snider | Richard Childress Racing | Chevrolet |
| 16 | 22 | Austin Cindric | Team Penske | Ford |
| 17 | 44 | Tommy Joe Martins | Martins Motorsports | Chevrolet |
| 18 | 36 | Alex Labbé | DGM Racing | Chevrolet |
| 19 | 68 | Brandon Brown | Brandonbilt Motorsports | Chevrolet |
| 20 | 98 | Riley Herbst | Stewart-Haas Racing | Ford |
| 21 | 61 | David Starr | Hattori Racing Enterprises | Toyota |
| 22 | 66 | Timmy Hill (i) | MBM Motorsports | Ford |
| 23 | 4 | Ryan Vargas (R) | JD Motorsports | Chevrolet |
| 24 | 99 | B. J. McLeod (i) | B. J. McLeod Motorsports | Toyota |
| 25 | 15 | Colby Howard | JD Motorsports | Chevrolet |
| 26 | 74 | Bayley Currey (i) | Mike Harmon Racing | Chevrolet |
| 27 | 17 | Cody Ware | SS-Green Light Racing with Rick Ware Racing | Chevrolet |
| 28 | 0 | Jeffrey Earnhardt | JD Motorsports | Chevrolet |
| 29 | 92 | Josh Williams | DGM Racing | Chevrolet |
| 30 | 26 | John Hunter Nemechek (i) | Sam Hunt Racing | Toyota |
| 31 | 23 | J. J. Yeley | Our Motorsports | Chevrolet |
| 32 | 47 | Kyle Weatherman | Mike Harmon Racing | Chevrolet |
| 33 | 78 | Jesse Little | B. J. McLeod Motorsports | Chevrolet |
| 34 | 48 | Jade Buford | Big Machine Racing Team | Chevrolet |
| 35 | 90 | Kyle Sieg | DGM Racing | Chevrolet |
| 36 | 07 | Joe Graf Jr. | SS-Green Light Racing | Chevrolet |
| 37 | 6 | Landon Cassill | JD Motorsports | Chevrolet |
| 38 | 13 | Matt Jaskol | MBM Motorsports | Toyota |
| 39 | 5 | Matt Mills | B. J. McLeod Motorsports | Toyota |
| 40 | 52 | Gray Gaulding | Means Motorsports | Chevrolet |
Official qualifying results

== Race ==
=== Race results ===
==== Stage Results ====
Stage One Laps: 45

| Pos | No | Driver | Team | Manufacturer | Points |
|---|---|---|---|---|---|
| 1 | 7 | Justin Allgaier | JR Motorsports | Chevrolet | 10 |
| 2 | 8 | Josh Berry (R) | JR Motorsports | Chevrolet | 9 |
| 3 | 16 | A. J. Allmendinger | Kaulig Racing | Chevrolet | 8 |
| 4 | 20 | Harrison Burton | Joe Gibbs Racing | Toyota | 7 |
| 5 | 19 | Brandon Jones | Joe Gibbs Racing | Toyota | 6 |
| 6 | 9 | Noah Gragson | JR Motorsports | Chevrolet | 5 |
| 7 | 54 | Ty Gibbs (R) | Joe Gibbs Racing | Toyota | 4 |
| 8 | 22 | Austin Cindric | Team Penske | Ford | 3 |
| 9 | 39 | Ryan Sieg | RSS Racing | Ford | 2 |
| 10 | 26 | John Hunter Nemechek (i) | Sam Hunt Racing | Toyota | 0 |

Stage Two Laps: 45

| Pos | No | Driver | Team | Manufacturer | Points |
|---|---|---|---|---|---|
| 1 | 8 | Josh Berry (R) | JR Motorsports | Chevrolet | 10 |
| 2 | 7 | Justin Allgaier | JR Motorsports | Chevrolet | 9 |
| 3 | 22 | Austin Cindric | Team Penske | Ford | 8 |
| 4 | 16 | A. J. Allmendinger | Kaulig Racing | Chevrolet | 7 |
| 5 | 20 | Harrison Burton | Joe Gibbs Racing | Toyota | 6 |
| 6 | 9 | Noah Gragson | JR Motorsports | Chevrolet | 5 |
| 7 | 1 | Michael Annett | JR Motorsports | Chevrolet | 4 |
| 8 | 26 | John Hunter Nemechek | Sam Hunt Racing | Toyota | 3 |
| 9 | 54 | Ty Gibbs (R) | Joe Gibbs Racing | Toyota | 2 |
| 10 | 98 | Riley Herbst | Stewart-Haas Racing | Ford | 1 |

=== Final Stage Results ===
Laps: 110

| Pos | Grid | No | Driver | Team | Manufacturer | Laps | Points | Status |
|---|---|---|---|---|---|---|---|---|
| 1 | 16 | 22 | Austin Cindric | Team Penske | Ford | 200 | 51 | Running |
| 2 | 6 | 8 | Josh Berry (R) | JR Motorsports | Chevrolet | 200 | 54 | Running |
| 3 | 2 | 7 | Justin Allgaier | JR Motorsports | Chevrolet | 200 | 53 | Running |
| 4 | 7 | 16 | A. J. Allmendinger | Kaulig Racing | Chevrolet | 200 | 48 | Running |
| 5 | 14 | 54 | Ty Gibbs | Joe Gibbs Racing | Toyota | 200 | 38 | Running |
| 6 | 5 | 20 | Harrison Burton | Joe Gibbs Racing | Toyota | 200 | 44 | Running |
| 7 | 11 | 1 | Michael Annett | JR Motorsports | Chevrolet | 200 | 34 | Running |
| 8 | 12 | 39 | Ryan Sieg | RSS Racing | Ford | 200 | 31 | Running |
| 9 | 1 | 18 | Daniel Hemric | Joe Gibbs Racing | Toyota | 200 | 28 | Running |
| 10 | 19 | 68 | Brandon Brown | Brandonbilt Motorsports | Chevrolet | 200 | 27 | Running |
| 11 | 13 | 10 | Jeb Burton | Kaulig Racing | Chevrolet | 200 | 26 | Running |
| 12 | 8 | 51 | Jeremy Clements | Jeremy Clements Racing | Chevrolet | 200 | 25 | Running |
| 13 | 10 | 02 | Brett Moffitt | Our Motorsports | Chevrolet | 199 | 24 | Running |
| 14 | 31 | 23 | J. J. Yeley | Our Motorsports | Chevrolet | 199 | 23 | Running |
| 15 | 3 | 9 | Noah Gragson | JR Motorsports | Chevrolet | 199 | 32 | Running |
| 16 | 15 | 2 | Myatt Snider | Richard Childress Racing | Chevrolet | 199 | 21 | Running |
| 17 | 20 | 98 | Riley Herbst | Stewart-Haas Racing | Ford | 198 | 21 | Running |
| 18 | 28 | 0 | Jeffrey Earnhardt | JD Motorsports | Chevrolet | 198 | 19 | Running |
| 19 | 18 | 36 | Alex Labbé | DGM Racing | Chevrolet | 198 | 18 | Running |
| 20 | 17 | 44 | Tommy Joe Martins | Martins Motorsports | Chevrolet | 198 | 17 | Running |
| 21 | 24 | 99 | B. J. McLeod (i) | B. J. McLeod Motorsports | Chevrolet | 198 | 0 | Running |
| 22 | 32 | 47 | Kyle Weatherman | Mike Harmon Racing | Chevrolet | 198 | 15 | Running |
| 23 | 27 | 17 | Cody Ware | SS-Green Light Racing with Rick Ware Racing | Chevrolet | 197 | 14 | Running |
| 24 | 26 | 74 | Bayley Currey (i) | Mike Harmon Motorsports | Chevrolet | 196 | 0 | Running |
| 25 | 37 | 6 | Landon Cassill | JD Motorsports | Chevrolet | 196 | 12 | Running |
| 26 | 23 | 4 | Ryan Vargas (R) | JD Motorsports | Chevrolet | 195 | 11 | Running |
| 27 | 39 | 5 | Matt Mills | B. J. McLeod Motorsports | Toyota | 195 | 10 | Running |
| 28 | 25 | 15 | Colby Howard | JD Motorsports | Chevrolet | 194 | 9 | Running |
| 29 | 36 | 07 | Joe Graf Jr. | SS-Green Light Racing | Chevrolet | 193 | 8 | Running |
| 30 | 22 | 66 | Timmy Hill (i) | MBM Motorsports | Toyota | 193 | 0 | Running |
| 31 | 40 | 52 | Gray Gaulding | Means Motorsports | Chevrolet | 192 | 6 | Running |
| 32 | 30 | 26 | John Hunter Nemechek (i) | Sam Hunt Racing | Toyota | 182 | 0 | Running |
| 33 | 34 | 48 | Jade Buford | Big Machine Racing Team | Chevrolet | 155 | 4 | Engine |
| 34 | 35 | 90 | Kyle Sieg | DGM Racing | Ford | 83 | 3 | Accident |
| 35 | 4 | 19 | Brandon Jones | Joe Gibbs Racing | Toyota | 68 | 8 | Accident |
| 36 | 9 | 11 | Zane Smith (i) | Kaulig Racing | Chevrolet | 67 | 0 | Accident |
| 37 | 33 | 78 | Jesse Little | B. J. McLeod Motorsports | Chevrolet | 57 | 1 | Accident |
| 38 | 29 | 92 | Josh Williams | DGM Racing | Chevrolet | 57 | 1 | Accident |
| 39 | 38 | 13 | Matt Jaskol | MBM Motorsports | Toyota | 56 | 1 | Accident |
| 40 | 21 | 61 | David Starr | Hattori Racing Enterprises | Toyota | 18 | 1 | Overheating |
Official race results

=== Race statistics ===
- Lead changes: 9 among 6 different drivers
- Cautions/Laps: 7 for 45
- Time of race: 2 hours, 6 minutes, and 20 seconds
- Average speed: 94.987 mph (152.867 km/h)

| Previous race: 2021 Steakhouse Elite 200 | NASCAR Xfinity Series; 2021 season | Next race: 2021 Pit Boss 250 |
