= 2020 Shady Rays 200 =

NASCAR Xfinity Series race

Race details
- Race 14 of 33 in the 2020 NASCAR Xfinity Series season
- Layout of Kentucky Speedway
- Date: July 9, 2020
- Location: Kentucky Speedway in Sparta, Kentucky
- Course: Permanent racing facility
- Course length: 1.5 miles (2.414 km)
- Distance: 136 laps, 204 mi (328.306 km)
- Scheduled distance: 134 laps, 201 mi (323.478 km)

Pole position
Driver	Noah Gragson	JR Motorsports
- Grid positions set by ballot

Most laps led
Driver	Noah Gragson	JR Motorsports
- Laps: 87

Winner
No. 22	Austin Cindric	Team Penske

Television in the United States
- Network: FS1
- Announcers: Adam Alexander, Clint Bowyer, Chad Knaus
- Nielsen ratings: 514,000

Radio in the United States
- Radio: PRN

The 2020 Shady Rays 200 was a NASCAR Xfinity Series race held on July 9, 2020, at Kentucky Speedway in Sparta, Kentucky. Contested over 136 laps—extended from 134 laps due to an overtime finish—on the 1.5-mile (2.4 km) speedway, it was the 14th race of the 2020 NASCAR Xfinity Series season. Team Penske's Austin Cindric won his first race of the season.

The Shady Rays 200 replaced New Hampshire Motor Speedway's date for the 2020 season due to the COVID-19 pandemic. It was the first of two races for the Xfinity Series at Kentucky.

This was the final time the Xfinity Series had a second race at Kentucky Speedway, as the track lost both its races in 2021.

== Report ==
=== Background ===
Kentucky Speedway is a 1.5-mile (2.4 km) tri-oval speedway in Sparta, Kentucky, which has hosted ARCA, NASCAR and Indy Racing League racing annually since it opened in 2000. The track is currently owned and operated by Speedway Motorsports, Inc. and Jerry Carroll, who, along with four other investors, owned Kentucky Speedway until 2008. The speedway has a grandstand capacity of 117,000. Construction of the speedway began in 1998 and was completed in mid-2000. The speedway has hosted the Gander RV & Outdoors Truck Series, Xfinity Series, IndyCar Series, Indy Lights, and most recently, the NASCAR Cup Series beginning in 2011.

The race was held without fans in attendance due to the ongoing COVID-19 pandemic.

=== Entry list ===
- (R) denotes rookie driver.
- (i) denotes driver who is ineligible for series driver points.

No.	Driver	Team	Manufacturer
0	Jeffrey Earnhardt	JD Motorsports	Chevrolet
1	Michael Annett	JR Motorsports	Chevrolet
02	Brett Moffitt (i)	Our Motorsports	Chevrolet
4	Jesse Little (R)	JD Motorsports	Chevrolet
5	Matt Mills	B. J. McLeod Motorsports	Toyota
6	B. J. McLeod	JD Motorsports	Chevrolet
7	Justin Allgaier	JR Motorsports	Chevrolet
07	Garrett Smithley	SS-Green Light Racing	Chevrolet
8	Jeb Burton	JR Motorsports	Chevrolet
08	Joe Graf Jr. (R)	SS-Green Light Racing	Chevrolet
9	Noah Gragson	JR Motorsports	Chevrolet
10	Ross Chastain	Kaulig Racing	Chevrolet
11	Justin Haley	Kaulig Racing	Chevrolet
13	Chad Finchum	MBM Motorsports	Toyota
15	Colby Howard	JD Motorsports	Chevrolet
18	Riley Herbst (R)	Joe Gibbs Racing	Toyota
19	Brandon Jones	Joe Gibbs Racing	Toyota
20	Harrison Burton (R)	Joe Gibbs Racing	Toyota
21	Anthony Alfredo	Richard Childress Racing	Chevrolet
22	Austin Cindric	Team Penske	Ford
36	Alex Labbé	DGM Racing	Chevrolet
39	Ryan Sieg	RSS Racing	Chevrolet
44	Tommy Joe Martins	Martins Motorsports	Chevrolet
47	Kyle Weatherman	Mike Harmon Racing	Chevrolet
51	Jeremy Clements	Jeremy Clements Racing	Chevrolet
52	Kody Vanderwal (R)	Means Racing	Chevrolet
61	Timmy Hill (i)	Hattori Racing	Toyota
66	Stephen Leicht	MBM Motorsports	Toyota
68	Brandon Brown	Brandonbilt Motorsports	Chevrolet
74	Bayley Currey (i)	Mike Harmon Racing	Chevrolet
78	Vinnie Miller	B. J. McLeod Motorsports	Chevrolet
90	Ronnie Bassett Jr.	DGM Racing	Chevrolet
92	Josh Williams	DGM Racing	Chevrolet
93	Myatt Snider (R)	RSS Racing	Chevrolet
98	Chase Briscoe	Stewart-Haas Racing	Ford
99	Mason Massey	B. J. McLeod Motorsports	Toyota
Official entry list

== Qualifying ==
Noah Gragson was awarded the pole for the race as determined by a random draw.

=== Starting Lineup ===
Pos	No	Driver	Team	Manufacturer
1	9	Noah Gragson	JR Motorsports	Chevrolet
2	10	Ross Chastain	Kaulig Racing	Chevrolet
3	8	Jeb Burton	JR Motorsports	Chevrolet
4	1	Michael Annett	JR Motorsports	Chevrolet
5	20	Harrison Burton (R)	Joe Gibbs Racing	Toyota
6	19	Brandon Jones	Joe Gibbs Racing	Toyota
7	98	Chase Briscoe	Stewart-Haas Racing	Ford
8	39	Ryan Sieg	RSS Racing	Chevrolet
9	11	Justin Haley	Kaulig Racing	Chevrolet
10	7	Justin Allgaier	JR Motorsports	Chevrolet
11	21	Anthony Alfredo	Richard Childress Racing	Chevrolet
12	22	Austin Cindric	Team Penske	Ford
13	02	Brett Moffitt (i)	Our Motorsports	Chevrolet
14	4	Jesse Little (R)	JD Motorsports	Chevrolet
15	07	Garrett Smithley	SS-Green Light Racing	Chevrolet
16	36	Alex Labbé	DGM Racing	Chevrolet
17	6	B. J. McLeod	JD Motorsports	Chevrolet
18	92	Josh Williams	DGM Racing	Chevrolet
19	68	Brandon Brown	Brandonbilt Motorsports	Chevrolet
20	51	Jeremy Clements	Jeremy Clements Racing	Chevrolet
21	15	Colby Howard	JD Motorsports	Chevrolet
22	90	Ronnie Bassett Jr.	DGM Racing	Chevrolet
23	18	Riley Herbst (R)	Joe Gibbs Racing	Toyota
24	0	Jeffrey Earnhardt	JD Motorsports	Chevrolet
25	52	Kody Vanderwal (R)	Means Racing	Chevrolet
26	99	Mason Massey	B. J. McLeod Motorsports	Toyota
27	74	Bayley Currey (i)	Mike Harmon Racing	Chevrolet
28	93	Myatt Snider (R)	RSS Racing	Chevrolet
29	66	Stephen Leicht	MBM Motorsports	Toyota
30	47	Kyle Weatherman	Mike Harmon Racing	Chevrolet
31	08	Joe Graf Jr. (R)	SS-Green Light Racing	Chevrolet
32	13	Chad Finchum	MBM Motorsports	Toyota
33	61	Timmy Hill (i)	Hattori Racing	Toyota
34	78	Vinnie Miller	B. J. McLeod Motorsports	Chevrolet
35	5	Matt Mills	B. J. McLeod Motorsports	Chevrolet
36	44	Tommy Joe Martins	Martins Motorsports	Chevrolet
Official starting lineup

- The No. 74 and No. 99 had to start from the rear due to unapproved adjustments.
- The No. 78 had to start from the rear due to stopping in its pit box during the pit road speed check.

== Race ==
=== Race results ===
==== Stage Results ====
Stage One

Laps: 30

Pos	No	Driver	Team	Manufacturer	Points
1	9	Noah Gragson	JR Motorsports	Chevrolet	10
2	20	Harrison Burton (R)	Joe Gibbs Racing	Toyota	9
3	22	Austin Cindric	Team Penske	Ford	8
4	10	Ross Chastain	Kaulig Racing	Chevrolet	7
5	21	Anthony Alfredo	Richard Childress Racing	Chevrolet	6
6	1	Michael Annett	JR Motorsports	Chevrolet	5
7	11	Justin Haley	Kaulig Racing	Chevrolet	4
8	7	Justin Allgaier	JR Motorsports	Chevrolet	3
9	39	Ryan Sieg	RSS Racing	Chevrolet	2
10	02	Brett Moffitt (i)	Our Motorsports	Chevrolet	0

Stage Two

Laps: 30

Pos	No	Driver	Team	Manufacturer	Points
1	9	Noah Gragson	JR Motorsports	Chevrolet	10
2	22	Austin Cindric	Team Penske	Ford	9
3	98	Chase Briscoe	Stewart-Haas Racing	Ford	8
4	10	Ross Chastain	Kaulig Racing	Chevrolet	7
5	18	Riley Herbst (R)	Joe Gibbs Racing	Toyota	6
6	7	Justin Allgaier	JR Motorsports	Chevrolet	5
7	1	Michael Annett	JR Motorsports	Chevrolet	4
8	39	Ryan Sieg	RSS Racing	Chevrolet	3
9	68	Brandon Brown	Brandonbilt Motorsports	Chevrolet	2
10	21	Anthony Alfredo	Richard Childress Racing	Chevrolet	1

=== Final Stage Results ===
Laps: 74

Pos	Grid	No	Driver	Team	Manufacturer	Laps	Points	Status
1	12	22	Austin Cindric	Team Penske	Ford	136	57	Running
2	23	18	Riley Herbst (R)	Joe Gibbs Racing	Toyota	136	41	Running
3	2	10	Ross Chastain	Kaulig Racing	Chevrolet	136	48	Running
4	7	98	Chase Briscoe	Stewart-Haas Racing	Ford	136	41	Running
5	4	1	Michael Annett	JR Motorsports	Chevrolet	136	41	Running
6	11	21	Anthony Alfredo	Richard Childress Racing	Chevrolet	136	38	Running
7	9	11	Justin Haley	Kaulig Racing	Chevrolet	136	34	Running
8	30	47	Kyle Weatherman	Mike Harmon Racing	Chevrolet	136	29	Running
9	8	39	Ryan Sieg	RSS Racing	Chevrolet	136	33	Running
10	13	02	Brett Moffitt (i)	Our Motorsports	Chevrolet	136	0	Running
11	1	9	Noah Gragson	JR Motorsports	Chevrolet	136	46	Running
12	20	51	Jeremy Clements	Jeremy Clements Racing	Chevrolet	136	25	Running
13	31	08	Joe Graf Jr. (R)	SS-Green Light Racing	Chevrolet	136	24	Running
14	14	4	Jesse Little (R)	JD Motorsports	Chevrolet	136	23	Running
15	28	93	Myatt Snider (R)	RSS Racing	Chevrolet	136	22	Running
16	32	13	Chad Finchum	MBM Motorsports	Toyota	136	21	Running
17	5	20	Harrison Burton (R)	Joe Gibbs Racing	Toyota	136	29	Running
18	17	6	B. J. McLeod	JD Motorsports	Chevrolet	136	19	Running
19	22	90	Ronnie Bassett Jr.	DGM Racing	Chevrolet	135	18	Accident
20	10	7	Justin Allgaier	JR Motorsports	Chevrolet	135	25	Accident
21	33	61	Timmy Hill (i)	Hattori Racing	Toyota	135	0	Accident
22	27	74	Bayley Currey (i)	Mike Harmon Racing	Chevrolet	135	0	Running
23	34	78	Vinnie Miller	B. J. McLeod Motorsports	Chevrolet	134	14	Running
24	16	36	Alex Labbé	DGM Racing	Chevrolet	134	13	Running
25	25	52	Kody Vanderwal (R)	Means Racing	Chevrolet	134	12	Running
26	18	92	Josh Williams	DGM Racing	Chevrolet	133	11	Running
27	19	68	Brandon Brown	Brandonbilt Motorsports	Chevrolet	132	12	Running
28	26	99	Mason Massey	B. J. McLeod Motorsports	Toyota	130	9	Running
29	24	0	Jeffrey Earnhardt	JD Motorsports	Chevrolet	129	8	Suspension
30	35	5	Matt Mills	B. J. McLeod Motorsports	Toyota	122	7	Running
31	15	07	Garrett Smithley	SS-Green Light Racing	Chevrolet	120	6	Brakes
32	21	15	Colby Howard	JD Motorsports	Chevrolet	119	5	Accident
33	36	44	Tommy Joe Martins	Martins Motorsports	Chevrolet	54	4	Rear Gear
34	3	8	Jeb Burton	JR Motorsports	Chevrolet	45	3	Accident
35	29	66	Stephen Leicht	MBM Motorsports	Toyota	21	2	Electrical
36	6	19	Brandon Jones	Joe Gibbs Racing	Toyota	0	1	Accident
Official race results

=== Race statistics ===
- Lead changes: 6 among 4 different drivers
- Cautions/Laps: 9 for 40
- Red flags: 0
- Time of race: 1 hour, 51 minutes, 31 seconds
- Average speed: 109.759 mph (176.640 km/h)

== Media ==
=== Television ===
The Shady Rays 200 was carried by FS1 in the United States. Adam Alexander, Stewart-Haas Racing driver Clint Bowyer, and Hendrick Motorsports crew chief Chad Knaus called the race from the Fox Sports Studio in Charlotte, with Jamie Little covering pit road.

FS1
Booth announcers	Pit reporter
Lap-by-lap: Adam Alexander Color-commentator: Clint Bowyer Color-commentator: Chad Knaus	Jamie Little

=== Radio ===
The Performance Racing Network (PRN) called the race for radio, which was simulcast on SiriusXM NASCAR Radio.

== Standings after the race ==
Drivers' Championship standings

	Pos	Driver	Points
	1	Chase Briscoe	597
	2	Noah Gragson	581 (-16)
1	3	Austin Cindric	552 (-45)
1	4	Ross Chastain	549 (-48)
	5	Justin Haley	485 (-112)
	6	Justin Allgaier	459 (-138)
	7	Harrison Burton (R)	450 (-147)
1	8	Michael Annett	414 (-183)
1	9	Brandon Jones	384 (-213)
	10	Ryan Sieg	362 (-235)
	11	Riley Herbst (R)	339 (-258)
1	12	Myatt Snider (R)	301 (-296)
Official driver's standings

- Note: Only the first 12 positions are included for the driver standings.
- . – Driver has clinched a position in the NASCAR playoffs.

Previous race: 2020 Pennzoil 150	NASCAR Xfinity Series; 2020 season	Next race: 2020 Alsco 300 (Kentucky)
