= 2021 Alsco Uniforms 300 =

Race details
- Race 4 of 33 in the 2021 NASCAR Xfinity Series season
- Las Vegas Motor Speedway
- Date: March 6, 2021
- Location: Las Vegas Motor Speedway in Las Vegas, Nevada
- Course: Permanent racing facility
- Course length: 1.50 miles (2.41 km)
- Distance: 200 laps, 300 mi (482.8 km)
- Average speed: 113.804 mph

Pole position
Driver	Myatt Snider	Richard Childress Racing
- Grid positions set by competition-based formula

Most laps led
Driver	Daniel Hemric	Joe Gibbs Racing
- Laps: 74

Winner
No. 16	A. J. Allmendinger	Kaulig Racing

Television in the United States
- Network: FS1
- Announcers: Adam Alexander, Kurt Busch, and Joey Logano

The 2021 Alsco Uniforms 300 was a NASCAR Xfinity Series race held on March 6, 2021. It was contested over 200 laps on the 1.5-mile (2.4 km) oval. It was the fourth race of the 2021 NASCAR Xfinity Series season. Kaulig Racing driver A. J. Allmendinger collected his first win of the season.

== Report ==
=== Background ===
Las Vegas Motor Speedway, located in Clark County, Nevada outside the Las Vegas city limits and about 15 miles northeast of the Las Vegas Strip, is a 1,200-acre (490 ha) complex of multiple tracks for motorsports racing. The complex is owned by Speedway Motorsports, Inc., which is headquartered in Charlotte, North Carolina.

=== Entry list ===
- (R) denotes rookie driver.
- (i) denotes driver who is ineligible for series driver points.

No.	Driver	Team	Manufacturer
0	Jeffrey Earnhardt	JD Motorsports	Chevrolet
1	Michael Annett	JR Motorsports	Chevrolet
2	Myatt Snider	Richard Childress Racing	Chevrolet
02	Brett Moffitt(I)	Our Motorsports	Chevrolet
03	Andy Lally	Our Motorsports	Chevrolet
4	Landon Cassill	JD Motorsports	Chevrolet
5	Matt Mills	B. J. McLeod Motorsports	Chevrolet
6	Ryan Vargas (R)	JD Motorsports	Chevrolet
7	Justin Allgaier	JR Motorsports	Chevrolet
07	Joe Graf Jr.	SS-Green Light Racing	Chevrolet
8	Josh Berry(R)	JR Motorsports	Chevrolet
9	Noah Gragson	JR Motorsports	Chevrolet
10	Jeb Burton	Kaulig Racing	Chevrolet
11	Justin Haley	Kaulig Racing	Chevrolet
13	David Starr	MBM Motorsports	Ford
15	Colby Howard	JD Motorsports	Chevrolet
16	A. J. Allmendinger	Kaulig Racing	Chevrolet
17	Garrett Smithley	SS-Green Light Racing with Rick Ware Racing	Chevrolet
18	Daniel Hemric	Joe Gibbs Racing	Toyota
19	Brandon Jones	Joe Gibbs Racing	Toyota
20	Harrison Burton	Joe Gibbs Racing	Toyota
22	Austin Cindric	Team Penske	Ford
23	Tyler Reddick	Our Motorsports	Chevrolet
26	Santino Ferrucci (R)	Sam Hunt Racing	Toyota
31	Jordan Anderson (I)	Jordan Anderson Racing	Chevrolet
36	Alex Labbé	DGM Racing	Chevrolet
39	Ryan Sieg	RSS Racing	Chevrolet
44	Tommy Joe Martins	Martins Motorsports	Chevrolet
47	Kyle Weatherman	Mike Harmon Racing	Chevrolet
48	Jade Buford (R)	Big Machine Racing Team	Chevrolet
51	Jeremy Clements	Jeremy Clements Racing	Chevrolet
52	Gray Gaulding	Means Racing	Chevrolet
54	Ty Dillon	Joe Gibbs Racing	Toyota
61	Chad Finchum	Hattori Racing Enterprises	Toyota
66	Timmy Hill	MBM Motorsports	Toyota
68	Brandon Brown	Brandonbilt Motorsports	Chevrolet
74	Bayley Currey	Mike Harmon Racing	Chevrolet
77	Dillon Bassett	Bassett Racing	Chevrolet
78	Jesse Little	B. J. McLeod Motorsports	Toyota
90	Dexter Bean	DGM Racing	Chevrolet
92	Josh Williams	DGM Racing	Chevrolet
98	Riley Herbst	Stewart-Haas Racing	Ford
99	Stefan Parsons	B. J. McLeod Motorsports	Toyota
Official entry list

== Qualifying ==
Myatt Snider was awarded the pole for the race as determined by competition-based formula. Jordan Anderson, Dillon Bassett, and Andy Lally did not have enough points to qualify for the race.

=== Starting Lineups ===
Pos	No	Driver	Team	Manufacturer
1	2	Myatt Snider	Richard Childress Racing	Chevrolet
2	22	Austin Cindric	Team Penske	Ford
3	18	Daniel Hemric	Joe Gibbs Racing	Toyota
4	19	Brandon Jones	Joe Gibbs Racing	Toyota
5	10	Jeb Burton	Kaulig Racing	Chevrolet
6	11	Justin Haley	Kaulig Racing	Chevrolet
7	02	Brett Moffitt	Our Motorsports	Chevrolet
8	51	Jeremy Clements	Jeremy Clements Racing	Chevrolet
9	8	Josh Berry (R)	JR Motorsports	Chevrolet
10	16	A. J. Allmendinger	Kaulig Racing	Chevrolet
11	39	Ryan Sieg	RSS Racing	Ford
12	98	Riley Herbst	Stewart-Haas Racing	Ford
13	1	Michael Annett	JR Motorsports	Chevrolet
14	4	Landon Cassill	JD Motorsports	Chevrolet
15	17	Garrett Smithley	SS-Green Light Racing with Rick Ware Racing	Chevrolet
16	90	Dexter Bean	DGM Racing	Chevrolet
17	36	Alex Labbé	DGM Racing	Chevrolet
18	66	Timmy Hill	MBM Motorsports	Toyota
19	47	Kyle Weatherman	Mike Harmon Racing	Chevrolet
20	54	Ty Dillon	Joe Gibbs Racing	Toyota
21	44	Tommy Joe Martins	Martins Motorsports	Chevrolet
22	20	Harrison Burton	Joe Gibbs Racing	Toyota
23	26	Santino Ferrucci (R)	Sam Hunt Racing	Toyota
24	92	Josh Williams	DGM Racing	Chevrolet
25	68	Brandon Brown	Brandonbilt Motorsports	Chevrolet
26	07	Joe Graf Jr.	SS-Green Light Racing	Chevrolet
27	48	Jade Buford (R)	Big Machine Racing Team	Chevrolet
28	13	David Starr	MBM Motorsports	Ford
29	61	Chad Finchum	Hattori Racing Enterprises	Toyota
30	0	Jeffrey Earnhardt	JD Motorsports	Chevrolet
31	5	Matt Mills	B. J. McLeod Motorsports	Chevrolet
32	78	Jesse Little	B. J. McLeod Motorsports	Toyota
33	99	Stefan Parsons	B. J. McLeod Motorsports	Toyota
34	9	Noah Gragson	JR Motorsports	Chevrolet
35	6	Ryan Vargas (R)	JD Motorsports	Chevrolet
36	52	Gray Gaulding	Means Motorsports	Chevrolet
37	7	Justin Allgaier	JR Motorsports	Chevrolet
38	15	Colby Howard	JD Motorsports	Chevrolet
39	74	Bayley Currey	Mike Harmon Racing	Chevrolet
40	23	Tyler Reddick (I)	Our Motorsports	Chevrolet
Official qualifying results

== Race ==
=== Race results ===
==== Stage Results ====
Stage One Laps: 45

Pos	No	Driver	Team	Manufacturer	Points
1	22	Austin Cindric	Team Penske	Ford	10
2	11	Justin Haley	Kaulig Racing	Chevrolet	9
3	18	Daniel Hemric	Joe Gibbs Racing	Toyota	8
4	16	A. J. Allmendinger	Kaulig Racing	Chevrolet	7
5	19	Brandon Jones	Joe Gibbs Racing	Toyota	6
6	1	Michael Annett	JR Motorsports	Chevrolet	5
7	7	Justin Allgaier	JR Motorsports	Chevrolet	4
8	9	Noah Gragson	JR Motorsports	Chevrolet	3
9	98	Riley Herbst	Stewart-Haas Racing	Ford	2
10	54	Ty Dillon	Joe Gibbs Racing	Toyota	1

Stage Two Laps: 30

Pos	No	Driver	Team	Manufacturer	Points
1	18	Daniel Hemric	Joe Gibbs Racing	Toyota	10
2	2	A. J. Allmendinger	Kaulig Racing	Chevrolet	9
3	7	Justin Allgaier	JR Motorsports	Chevrolet	8
4	19	Brandon Jones	Joe Gibbs Racing	Toyota	7
5	02	Brett Moffitt	Our Motorsports	Chevrolet	6
6	1	Michael Annett	JR Motorsports	Chevrolet	5
7	9	Noah Gragson	JR Motorsports	Chevrolet	4
8	20	Harrison Burton	Joe Gibbs Racing	Toyota	3
9	68	Brandon Brown	Brandonbilt Motorsports	Chevrolet	2
10	22	Austin Cindric	Joe Gibbs Racing	Ford	1

=== Final Stage Results ===
Laps: 110

Pos	Grid	No	Driver	Team	Manufacturer	Laps	Points	Status
1	10	16	A. J. Allmendinger	Kaulig Racing	Chevrolet	200	56	Running
2	3	18	Daniel Hemric	Joe Gibbs Racing	Toyota	200	53	Running
3	4	19	Brandon Jones	Joe Gibbs Racing	Toyota	200	47	Running
4	2	22	Austin Cindric	Team Penske	Ford	200	44	Running
5	34	9	Noah Gragson	JR Motorsports	Chevrolet	200	39	Running
6	13	1	Michael Annett	JR Motorsports	Chevrolet	200	41	Running
7	9	8	Josh Berry (R)	JR Motorsports	Chevrolet	200	30	Running
8	6	11	Justin Haley	Kaulig Racing	Chevrolet	200	38	Running
9	22	20	Harrison Burton	Joe Gibbs Racing	Toyota	200	31	Running
10	5	10	Jeb Burton	Kaulig Racing	Chevrolet	200	27	Running
11	25	68	Brandon Brown	Brandonbilt Motorsports	Chevrolet	200	28	Running
12	40	23	Tyler Reddick (I)	Our Motorsports	Chevrolet	200	0	Running
13	23	26	Santino Ferrucci (R)	Sam Hunt Racing	Toyota	200	24	Running
14	37	7	Justin Allgaier	JR Motorsports	Chevrolet	200	35	Running
15	21	44	Tommy Joe Martins	Martins Motorsports	Chevrolet	200	22	Running
16	24	92	Josh Williams	DGM Racing	Chevrolet	200	21	Running
17	8	51	Jeremy Clements	Jeremy Clements Racing	Chevrolet	199	20	Running
18	26	07	Joe Graf Jr.	SS-Green Light Racing	Chevrolet	199	19	Running
19	30	0	Jeffrey Earnhardt	JD Motorsports	Chevrolet	199	18	Running
20	38	15	Colby Howard	JD Motorsports	Chevrolet	199	17	Running
21	14	4	Landon Cassill	JD Motorsports	Chevrolet	199	16	Running
22	39	74	Bayley Currey (I)	Mike Harmon Racing	Chevrolet	199	15	Running
23	35	6	Ryan Vargas (R)	JD Motorsports	Chevrolet	199	14	Running
24	15	17	Garrett Smithley	SS-Green Light Racing with Rick Ware Racing	Chevrolet	199	13	Running
25	16	90	Dexter Bean	DGM Racing	Chevrolet	198	12	Running
26	32	78	Jesse Little	B. J. McLeod Motorsports	Chevrolet	198	11	Running
27	36	52	Gray Gaulding	Means Motorsports	Chevrolet	198	10	Running
28	29	61	Chad Finchum	Hattori Racing Enterprises	Toyota	198	9	Running
29	28	13	David Starr	MBM Motorsports	Ford	198	8	Running
30	27	48	Jade Buford (R)	Big Machine Racing Team	Chevrolet	196	7	Running
31	20	54	Ty Dillon	Joe Gibbs Racing	Toyota	195	7	Running
32	1	2	Myatt Snider	Richard Childress Racing	Chevrolet	191	5	Running
33	19	47	Kyle Weatherman	Mike Harmon Racing	Chevrolet	184	4	Running
34	7	02	Brett Moffitt (I)	Our Motorsports	Chevrolet	181	0	Accident
35	17	36	Alex Labbé	DGM Racing	Chevrolet	181	2	Accident
36	33	99	Stefan Parsons	B. J. McLeod Motorsports	Chevrolet	137	1	Fuel Line
37	18	66	Timmy Hill	MBM Motorsports	Toyota	100	1	Engine
38	11	39	Ryan Sieg	RSS Racing	Chevrolet	73	1	Accident
39	31	5	Matt Mills	B. J. McLeod Motorsports	Chevrolet	72	1	Electrical
40	12	98	Riley Herbst	Stewart-Haas Racing	Ford	56	3	Accident
Official race results

=== Race statistics ===
- Lead changes: 23 among 7 different drivers
- Cautions/Laps: 8 for 45
- Time of race: 2 hours, 38 minutes, and 10 seconds
- Average speed: 113.804 mph (183.150 km/h)

Previous race: 2021 Contender Boats 250	NASCAR Xfinity Series; 2021 season	Next race: 2021 Call 811 Before You Dig 200
