= Bassett Racing =

American stock car racing team

- Owner(s): Ronnie Bassett Sr. Ronnie Bassett Jr. Dillon Bassett
- Base: Winston-Salem, North Carolina
- Series: NASCAR Xfinity Series
- Race drivers: Xfinity Series: 77. Ronnie Bassett Jr., Dillon Bassett (part-time)
- Manufacturer: Chevrolet
- Opened: 2009

Career
- Debut: NASCAR K&N Pro Series East: 2013 Kevin Whitaker Chevrolet 140 (Greenville); NASCAR K&N Pro Series West: 2015 Casino Arizona 100 (Phoenix); Xfinity Series: 2021 Pit Boss 250 (Austin)
- Latest race: K&N Pro Series East: 2018 Crosley Brands 125 (Dover); K&N Pro Series West: 2017 West Coast Stock Car Hall of Fame Championship 150 (Bakersfield); Xfinity Series: 2026 Food City 300 (Bristol)
- Races competed: Total: 120; K&N Pro Series East: 116; K&N Pro Series West: 3 Xfinity Series: 2
- Drivers' Championships: Total: 0 K&N Pro Series East: 0 K&N Pro Series West: 0 Xfinity Series: 0
- Race victories: Total: 2 K&N Pro Series East: 2 K&N Pro Series West: 0 Xfinity Series: 0
- Pole positions: Total: 0 K&N Pro Series East: 0 K&N Pro Series West: 0 Xfinity Series: 0

Bassett Racing is an American stock car racing team that competes in the NASCAR Xfinity Series. The team was founded in 2009 by Ronnie Bassett Sr., and last fielded the No. 77 Chevrolet Camaro SS part-time for his sons, Ronnie and Dillon Bassett.

== History ==
Bassett Racing was formed in 2009 by Ronnie Bassett Sr., to allow his oldest son, Ronnie Bassett Jr., to race in the USRA STARS Late Model Series. Dillon Bassett, his younger son, would debut in 2011, and would later win the championship in 2013.

== K&N Pro Series East ==
=== Car No. 04 history ===
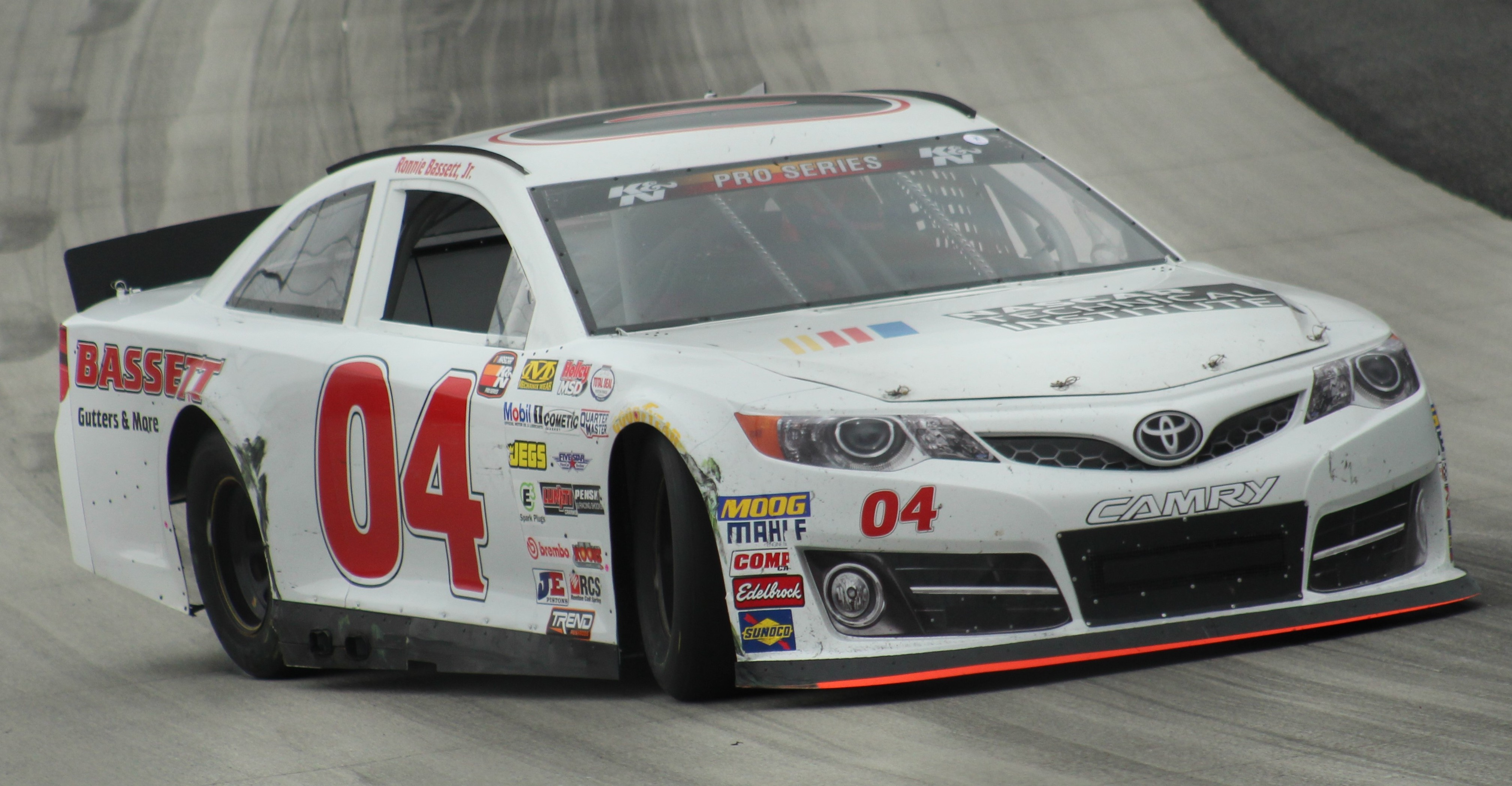
Bassett in the No. 04 car at Dover International Speedway in 2018.

==== Ronnie Bassett Jr. (2013-2018) ====
The team made their K&N Pro Series East (now ARCA Menards Series East) debut in 2013, with Ronnie Bassett Jr. driving in three races. He finished 23rd in his first race at Greenville-Pickens Speedway, and would follow up with a tenth place finish at New Hampshire Motor Speedway. The team would run the full schedule in 2014, with Bassett getting three top-fives and six top-tens, finishing 11th in the final standings. The team went back to a part-time schedule from 2015 to 2016, finishing 15th in point standings for both years. 2017 would be the team's breakout season, as Bassett would collect his first career win at New Smyrna Speedway, after leading 42 laps. He finished off the season with eight top-fives and eleven top-tens, finishing their career best third in points. He returned for one more full time season in 2018, finishing fourth in points after getting three top-fives and nine top-tens.

==== Car No. 04 Results ====
Bassett Racing No. 04 Car
NASCAR K&N Pro Series East results
Year	Driver	No.	Make	1	2	3	4	5	6	7	8	9	10	11	12	13	14	15	16	Owners	Pts	Ref
2013	Ronnie Bassett Jr.	04	Toyota	BRI	GRE	PEN	RCH	BGS	IOW	LGY	COL	IOW	VIR	GRE; 23	NHA; 10	DOV; DNQ	RAL			35th	68	
2014	Ronnie Bassett Jr.	04	Toyota	NSM; 19	DAY; 23	BRI; 23	GRE; 2	RCH; 5	IOW; 8	BGS; 5	FFL; 9	LGY; 20	NHA; 6	COL; 11	IOW; 18		VIR; 17		DOV; 12	11th	491	
2014	Ronnie Bassett Jr.	04	Chevy													GLN; 15		GRE; 20		11th	491	
2015	Ronnie Bassett Jr.	04	Ford	NSM; 16	GRE; 8	BRI; 15	IOW; 2	BGS; 12	LGY; 11	COL; 5	NHA; 25	IOW; 23	GLN	MOT; 19	VIR	RCH; 24	DOV; 28			15th	340	
2016	Ronnie Bassett Jr.	04	Ford	NSM; 3	MOB; 10	GRE; 3	BRI; 19	VIR; 5												15th	286	
2016	Ronnie Bassett Jr.	04	Chevy												GRE; 4	NJM	DOV; 26			15th	286	
2017	Ronnie Bassett Jr.	04	Chevy	NSM; 1	GRE; 2	BRI; 22	SBO; 15	SBO; 14	MEM; 4	BLN; 5	TMP; 3	NHA; 3	IOW; 9		LGY; 4		DOV; 9			3rd	518	
2017	Ronnie Bassett Jr.	04	Toyota											GLN; 6		NJM; 5				3rd	518	
2018	Ronnie Bassett Jr.	04	Toyota	NSM; 8	BRI; 8						TMP; 12					NHA; 9	DOV; 9			4th	487	
2018	Ronnie Bassett Jr.	04	Chevy			LGY; 11	SBO; 6	SBO; 4	MEM; 5	NJM; 3		NHA; 14	IOW; 16	GLN; 10	GTW; 14					4th	487	

=== Car No. 44 history ===
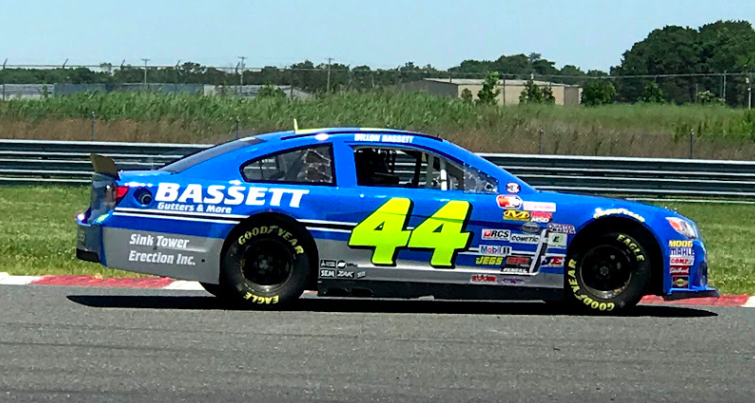
Bassett in the No. 44 car at New Jersey Motorsports Park in 2018.

==== Dillon Bassett (2015-2018) ====
The team would field a second car in 2015, the No. 44 being driven by Dillon Bassett. Bassett started off with a sixth place finish at New Smyrna, and a streak of top-20 finishes for the next few races. Bassett earned his first career win for the team at Motordrome Speedway, after dominating the race and leading 54 laps. He finished 13th in the standings that season. He continued running part time in 2016, before going full time in 2017. He finished his career best eighth in point standings for both 2017 and 2018.

==== Car No. 44 Results ====
Bassett Racing No. 44 Car
NASCAR K&N Pro Series East results
Year	Driver	No.	Make	1	2	3	4	5	6	7	8	9	10	11	12	13	14	Owners	Pts	Ref
2015	Dillon Bassett	44	Ford	NSM; 6	GRE; 16	BRI; 18	IOW; 20		LGY; 13	COL; 8	NHA; 13	IOW; 11	GLN	MOT; 1	VIR	RCH; 2	DOV; 31	13th	377	
2015	Dillon Bassett	44	Toyota					BGS; 16										13th	377	
2016	Dillon Bassett	44	Ford	NSM; 27	MOB; 24	GRE; 5	BRI; 5	VIR; 13										17th	270	
2016	Dillon Bassett	44	Toyota						DOM; 22	STA; 2	COL	NHA	IOW	GLN				17th	270	
2016	Dillon Bassett	44	Chevy												GRE; 6	NJE	DOV; 23	17th	270	
2017	Dillon Bassett	44	Chevy	NSM; 24*	GRE; 8*	BRI; 21	SBO; 4	SBO; 13	MEM; 9	BLN; 17	TMP; 5	NHA; 8	IOW; 20	GLN; 9	LGY; 13*	NJE; 7	DOV; 14	8th	450	
2018	Dillon Bassett	44	Ford	NSM; 25														8th	448	
2018	Dillon Bassett	44	Chevy		BRI; 16	LGY; 4	SBO; 17	SBO; 8	MEM; 6	NJE; 15				GLN; 21	GTW; 8			8th	448	
2018	Dillon Bassett	44	Toyota								TMP; 2	NHA; 20	IOW; 12			NHA; 5	DOV; 10	8th	448	

== K&N Pro Series West ==
=== Car No. 04 history ===
==== Ronnie Bassett Jr. (2015, 2017) ====
Bassett Jr. made his K&N Pro Series West (now ARCA Menards Series West) debut for the team in 2015, driving in a collaboration race with K&N East Series. His only start that season would come at Phoenix Raceway, where he finished tenth. His last start would come in 2017, finishing 23rd at the Kern County Raceway Park.

==== Car No. 04 Results ====
Bassett Racing No. 04 Car
NASCAR K&N Pro Series West results
Year	Driver	No.	Make	1	2	3	4	5	6	7	8	9	10	11	12	13	14	Owners	Pts	Ref
2015	Ronnie Bassett Jr.	04	Ford	KCR	IRW	TUS	IOW	SHA	SON	SLS	IOW	EVG	CNS	MER	AAS	PHO; 10		49th	34	
2017	Ronnie Bassett Jr.	04	Chevy	KCR	TUS	IRW	IRW	SPO	OSS	CNS	SON	IOW	EVG	DCS	MER	AAS	KCR; 23	60th	21	

=== Car No. 44 history ===
==== Dillon Bassett (2017) ====
Bassett ran at Kern County Raceway Park in 2017, in a collaboration race with the K&N East Series. He would finish in fifth.

==== Car No. 44 Results ====
Bassett Racing No. 44 Car
NASCAR K&N Pro Series West results
Year	Driver	No.	Make	1	2	3	4	5	6	7	8	9	10	11	12	13	14	Owners	Pts	Ref
2017	Dillon Bassett	44	Chevy	KCR	TUS	IRW	IRW	SPO	OSS	CNS	SON	IOW	EVG	DCS	MER	AAS	KCR; 5	38th	41	

== Xfinity Series ==
=== Car No. 77 history ===
On February 2, 2021, Ronnie Bassett Sr. and his sons announced that they would be reviving their team, and would attempt to run the full 2021 NASCAR Xfinity Series season with Ronnie and Dillon Bassett. The team failed to qualify the season-opener at Daytona due to qualifying being rained out. The team would DNQ for the next nine races due to combination of the number of entries per race and a lack of qualifying. Bassett Racing would debut at Circuit of the Americas with Austin Dillon being able to qualify on time, he would finish 13th. The team would fail to qualify for the rest of the season once again because of no qualifying. Bassett Racing plans to run 15-18 races in 2022. Dillon Bassett would finally manage to qualify the No. 77 at Nashville after a string of DNQs.

==== Car No. 77 results ====
NASCAR Xfinity Series results
Year	Driver	No.	Make	1	2	3	4	5	6	7	8	9	10	11	12	13	14	15	16	17	18	19	20	21	22	23	24	25	26	27	28	29	30	31	32	33	Owners	Pts	Ref
2021	Ronnie Bassett Jr.	77	Chevy	DAY; DNQ	DAY; DNQ	HOM; DNQ			ATL; DNQ	MAR; DNQ	TAL; DNQ	DAR; DNQ	DOV; DNQ																								42nd	34	
2021	Dillon Bassett	77	Chevy				LVS; DNQ	PHO; DNQ							CLT; DNQ	MOH; DNQ	TEX	NSH	POC	ROA	ATL	NHA	GLN	IND	MCH	DAY; DNQ	DAR	RCH	BRI	LVS	TAL	CLT	TEX	KAN	MAR	PHO	42nd	34	
2021	Austin Dillon	77	Chevy											COA; 13																							42nd	34	
2022	Ronnie Bassett Jr.	77	Chevy	DAY; DNQ	CAL	LVS	PHO				MAR; DNQ	TAL	DOV	DAR	TEX	CLT; DNQ	PIR		ROA	ATL	NHA	POC; 36	IND		GLN	DAY; DNQ	DAR	KAN	BRI; 28	TEX	TAL	CLT	LVS	HOM	MAR; DNQ	PHO	46th	29	—*
2022	Dillon Bassett	77	Chevy					ATL; DNQ	COA	RCH; DNQ								NSH; 30						MCH; 34													46th	29	—*
