= Carson Ware =

American racing driver (born 2000)

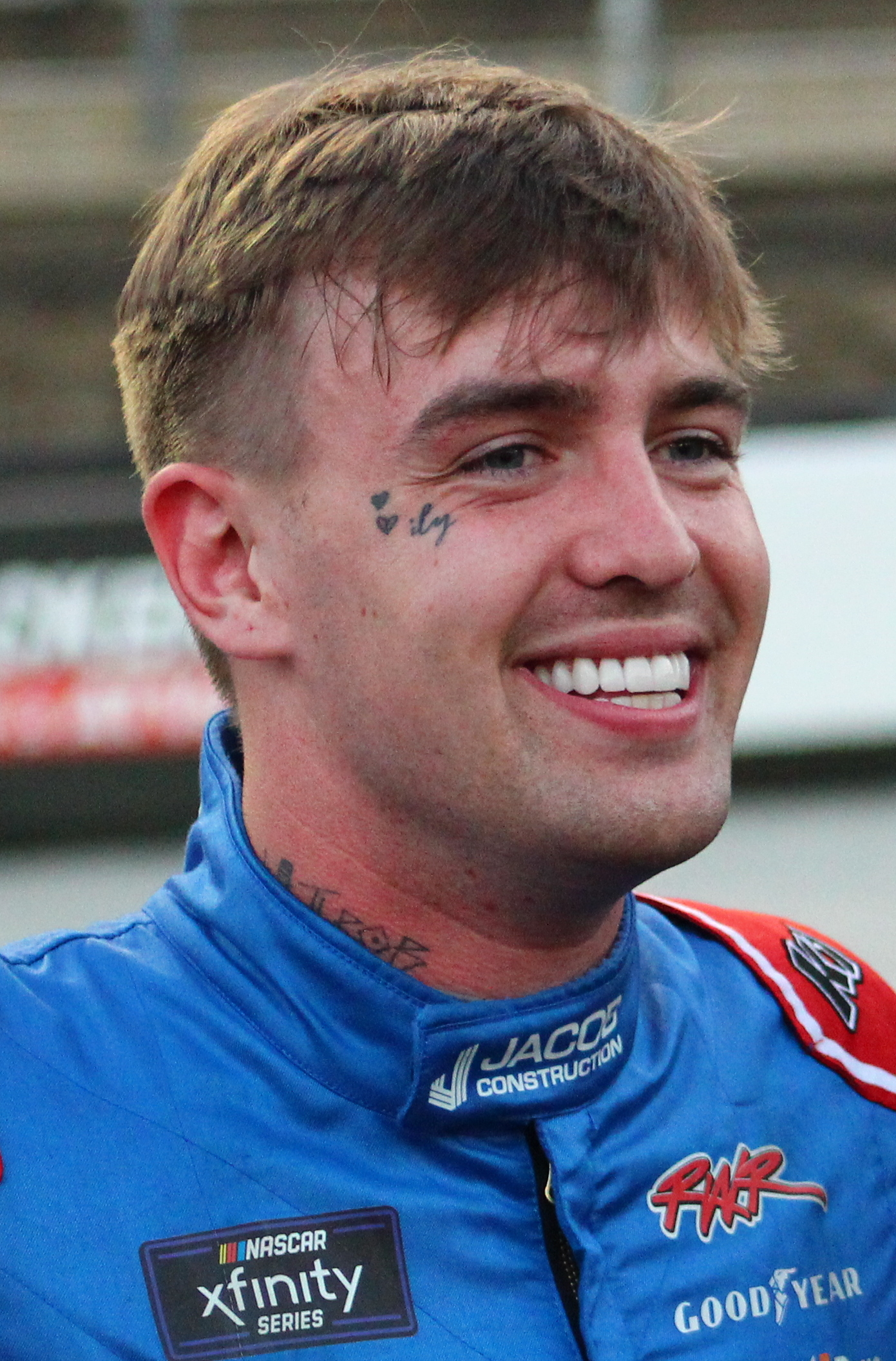
- Ware at Bristol Motor Speedway in 2024
- Born: Carson Reed Ware; February 28, 2000 (age 26); Jamestown, North Carolina, U.S.

NASCAR O'Reilly Auto Parts Series career
- 24 races run over 5 years
- 2026 position: 42nd
- Best finish: 42nd (2026)
- First race: 2020 Cheddar's 300 (Bristol)
- Last race: 2026 National Debt Relief 250 (Martinsville)
Wins	Top tens	Poles
0	0	0

NASCAR FedEx Freight Truck Series career
- 1 race run over 1 year
- 2019 position: 94th
- Best finish: 94th (2019)
- First race: 2019 Lucas Oil 150 (Phoenix)
Wins	Top tens	Poles
0	0	0

ARCA Menards Series career
- 2 races run over 2 years
- Best finish: 65th (2019)
- First race: 2019 Kansas ARCA 150 (Kansas)
- Last race: 2025 Bush's Beans 200 (Bristol)
Wins	Top tens	Poles
0	0	0

ARCA Menards Series East career
- 1 race run over 1 year
- Best finish: 59th (2025)
- First race: 2025 Bush's Beans 200 (Bristol)
Wins	Top tens	Poles
0	0	0
- Statistics up to date as of November 7, 2026.

Carson Reed Ware (born February 28, 2000) is an American professional stock car racing driver. He last competed part-time in the NASCAR O'Reilly Auto Parts Series, driving the No. 30 Chevrolet Camaro SS for Barrett–Cope Racing, the No. 35/53 Chevrolet Camaro SS for Joey Gase Motorsports with Scott Osteen, and the No. 47 for Chevrolet Camaro SS for Team Stange Racing with Mike Harmon Racing. He has previously competed in the NASCAR Gander Outdoors Truck Series and the ARCA Menards Series.

== Racing career ==
Before racing in NASCAR and the ARCA Menards Series, Ware competed in Pro Late Models. In October 2019, he made his ARCA debut at Kansas Speedway with Rick Ware Racing in a partnership with Venturini Motorsports. The following month, he joined Reaume Brothers Racing for his first NASCAR Gander Outdoors Truck Series event, the Lucas Oil 150 at ISM Raceway.

In May 2020, Ware made his NASCAR Xfinity Series debut at Bristol Motor Speedway with SS-Green Light Racing; the team had formed an alliance with Rick Ware Racing to run the No. 07 car for Ware and RWR's other drivers.

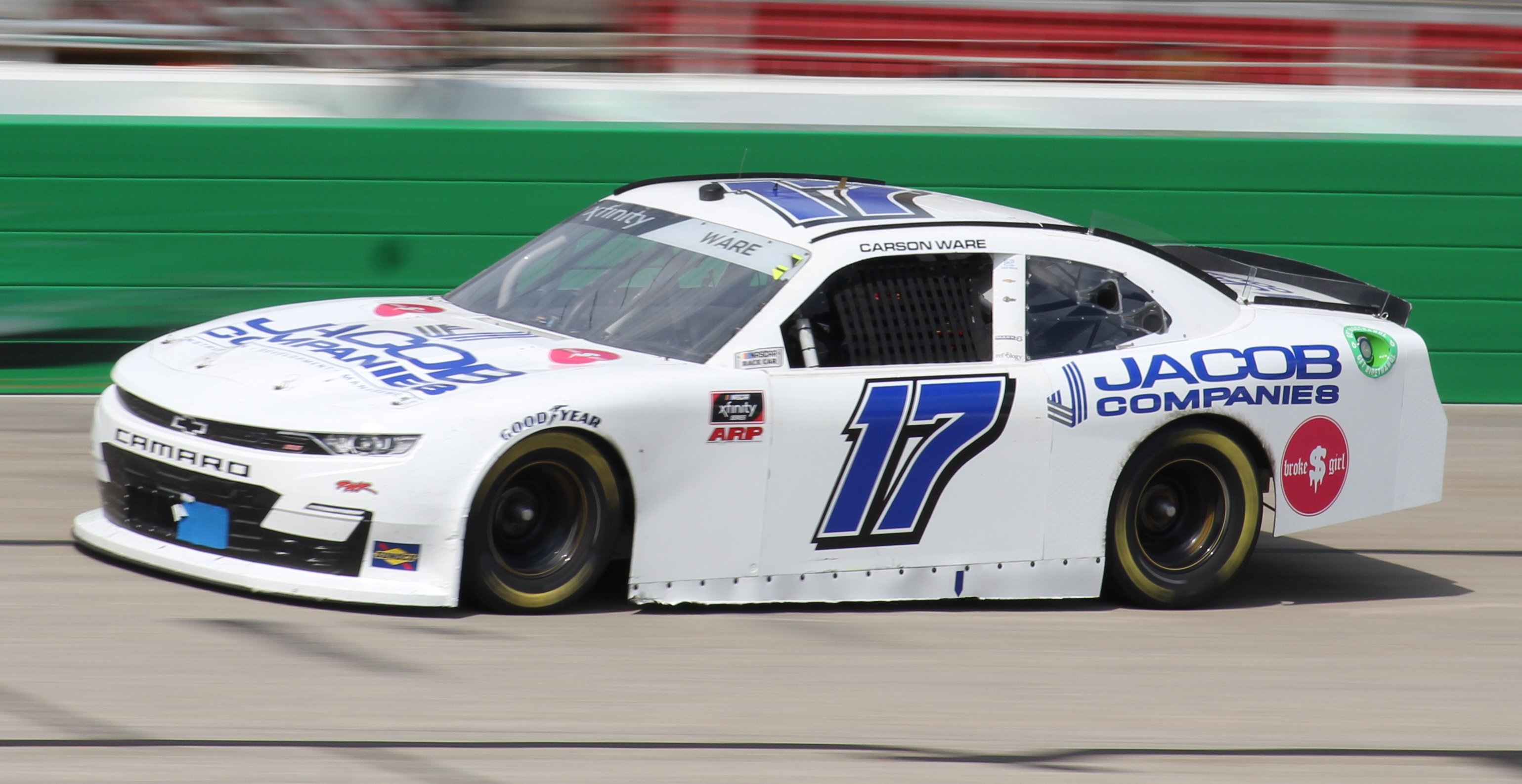
Ware's No. 17 car at Atlanta Motor Speedway in 2021

Ware continued competing for RWR in 2021, driving the Nos. 17 and 52. He also competed in Mike Harmon Racing's No. 74 at Darlington Raceway.

In 2024, Ware returned to NASCAR competition for the first time since his suspension, driving for Joey Gase Motorsports at Bristol Motor Speedway. He would also compete for the team at Talladega Superspeedway and Martinsville Speedway.

Ware returned to Mike Harmon Racing for the first time since 2021 for the 2025 season opener at Daytona International Speedway, where he failed to qualify. He finished 32nd for the team at Atlanta Motor Speedway. Ware would compete in the race at Martinsville for SS-Green Light Racing, where he finished 30th. On May 3, 2025, Ware scored his first career CARS Tour win in a rain shortened race at Ace Speedway.

In January 2026, Ware joined the newly formed Barrett-Cope Racing team to compete part-time in the NASCAR O'Reilly Auto Parts Series. He made his debut at Daytona Speedway in the season opener, finishing 19th, which marked a career-best result across NASCAR’s three national touring series.

== Personal life ==
He is the son of Rick Ware and brother of Cody Ware.

On October 20, 2021, Ware was arrested in Rowan County, North Carolina, on assault and property damage charges. NASCAR indefinitely suspended him after the arrest. On June 8, 2022, NASCAR lifted Ware's suspension.

== Motorsports career results ==
=== Stock car career summary ===
Season	Series	Team	Races	Wins	Top 5	Top 10	Points	Position
2019	ARCA Menards Series	Rick Ware Racing	1	0	0	0	165	65th
2019	NASCAR Gander Outdoor Truck Series	Reaume Brothers Racing	1	0	0	0	7	94th
2020	NASCAR Xfinity Series	SS-Green Light Racing	3	0	0	0	41	53rd
2021	NASCAR Xfinity Series	Rick Ware Racing	5	0	0	0	36	55th
2021	NASCAR Xfinity Series	Mike Harmon Racing	1	0	0	0	36	55th
2024	Carolina Pro Late Model Series	Rick Ware Racing	8	1	7	8	846	**3rd**
2024	NASCAR Xfinity Series	Joey Gase Motorsports	3	0	0	0	25	58th
2025	CARS Pro Late Model Tour	Rick Ware Racing	4	1	1	2	135	18th
2025	ARCA Menards Series East	Rick Ware Racing	1	0	0	0	29	59th
2025	ARCA Menards Series	Rick Ware Racing	1	0	0	0	29	113th
2025	NASCAR Xfinity Series	Mike Harmon Racing	2	0	0	0	35	49th
2025	NASCAR Xfinity Series	SS-Green Light Racing	2	0	0	0	35	49th
2025	NASCAR Xfinity Series	Joey Gase Motorsports with Scott Osteen	1	0	0	0	35	49th
2026	IHRA Pro Late Model Series	Rick Ware Racing	0	0	0	0	0	N/A
2026	Carolina Pro Late Model Series	Rick Ware Racing	4	2	3	3		
2026	ASA STARS National Tour	Rick Ware Racing	1	0	0	0		
2026	CARS Pro Late Model Tour	Rick Ware Racing	5	0	0	2	152	16th
2026	NASCAR O'Reilly Auto Parts Series	Barrett-Cope Racing	1	0	0	0	65	42nd
2026	NASCAR O'Reilly Auto Parts Series	Joey Gase Motorsports with Scott Osteen	4	0	0	0	65	42nd
2026	NASCAR O'Reilly Auto Parts Series	Team Stange Racing with Mike Harmon Racing	2	0	0	0	65	42nd

=== NASCAR ===
(key) (Bold – Pole position awarded by qualifying time. Italics – Pole position earned by points standings or practice time. * – Most laps led.)

==== O'Reilly Auto Parts Series ====
NASCAR O'Reilly Auto Parts Series results
Year	Team	No.	Make	1	2	3	4	5	6	7	8	9	10	11	12	13	14	15	16	17	18	19	20	21	22	23	24	25	26	27	28	29	30	31	32	33	NOAPSC	Pts	Ref
2020	SS-Green Light Racing	07	Chevy	DAY	LVS	CAL	PHO	DAR	CLT	BRI; 22	ATL	HOM	HOM; 28	TAL	POC; 20	IRC	KEN	KEN	TEX	KAN	ROA	DRC	DOV	DOV	DAY	DAR	RCH	RCH	BRI	LVS	TAL	ROV	KAN	TEX	MAR	PHO	53rd	41	
2021	Rick Ware Racing	17	Chevy	DAY	DRC	HOM	LVS	PHO	ATL	MAR	TAL	DAR	DOV	COA	CLT	MOH	TEX	NSH	POC; 28	ROA	ATL; 36	NHA	GLN	IRC	MCH; 28	DAY			BRI; 32								55th	36	
2021	Mike Harmon Racing	74	Chevy																								DAR; 31	RCH									55th	36	
2021	Rick Ware Racing	52	Toyota																											LVS; 31	TAL	ROV	TEX	KAN	MAR	PHO	55th	36	
2024	Joey Gase Motorsports	35	Chevy	DAY	ATL	LVS	PHO	COA	RCH	MAR	TEX	TAL	DOV	DAR	CLT	PIR	SON	IOW	NHA	NSH	CSC	POC	IND	MCH	DAY	DAR	ATL	GLN	BRI; 28	KAN					MAR; 37	PHO	58th	25	
2024	Joey Gase Motorsports	53	Ford																												TAL; 22	ROV	LVS	HOM			58th	25	
2025	Mike Harmon Racing	74	Chevy	DAY; DNQ	ATL; 32	COA	PHO	LVS	HOM																									TAL; 21	MAR	PHO	49th	35	
2025	SS-Green Light Racing	07	Chevy							MAR; 30	DAR	BRI	CAR	TAL	TEX															BRI; 33	KAN	ROV	LVS				49th	35	
2025	Joey Gase Motorsports with Scott Osteen	35	Ford													CLT; DNQ	NSH	MXC	POC; 34	ATL	CSC	SON	DOV	IND	IOW	GLN	DAY	PIR	GTW								49th	35	
2026	Barrett–Cope Racing	30	Chevy	DAY; 19	ATL	COA	PHO	LVS	DAR	MAR	CAR	BRI	KAN	TAL	TEX	GLN	DOV	CLT	NSH																		42nd	65	
2026	Joey Gase Motorsports with Scott Osteen	35	Chevy																	POC; 27	COR	SON	CHI														42nd	65	
2026	Team Stange Racing with Mike Harmon Racing	47	Chevy																					ATL; 36	IND	IOW; 37								TAL; DNQ			42nd	65	
2026	Joey Gase Motorsports with Scott Osteen	53	Chevy																								DAY; 24	DAR	GTW	BRI; 29	LVS	CLT	PHO		MAR; 23	HOM	42nd	65	

==== Gander Outdoors Truck Series ====
NASCAR Gander Outdoors Truck Series results
Year	Team	No.	Make	1	2	3	4	5	6	7	8	9	10	11	12	13	14	15	16	17	18	19	20	21	22	23	NGOTC	Pts	Ref
2019	Reaume Brothers Racing	33	Toyota	DAY	ATL	LVS	MAR	TEX	DOV	KAN	CLT	TEX	IOW	GTW	CHI	KEN	POC	ELD	MCH	BRI	MSP	LVS	TAL	MAR	PHO; 30	HOM	94th	7	

^{*} Season still in progress
^{1} Ineligible for series points

=== ARCA Menards Series ===
(key) (Bold – Pole position awarded by qualifying time. Italics – Pole position earned by points standings or practice time. * – Most laps led.)

ARCA Menards Series results
Year	Team	No.	Make	1	2	3	4	5	6	7	8	9	10	11	12	13	14	15	16	17	18	19	20	AMSC	Pts	Ref
2019	Rick Ware Racing	51	Toyota	DAY	FIF	SLM	TAL	NSH	TOL	CLT	POC	MCH	MAD	GTW	CHI	ELK	IOW	POC	ISF	DSF	SLM	IRP	KAN; 13	65th	165	
2025	Rick Ware Racing	51	Chevy	DAY	PHO	TAL	KAN	CLT	MCH	BLN	ELK	LRP	DOV	IRP	IOW	GLN	ISF	MAD	DSF	BRI; 15	SLM	KAN	TOL	113th	29	

==== ARCA Menards Series East ====
ARCA Menards Series East results
Year	Team	No.	Make	1	2	3	4	5	6	7	8	AMSEC	Pts	Ref
2025	Rick Ware Racing	51	Chevy	FIF	CAR	NSV	FRS	DOV	IRP	IOW	BRI; 15	59th	29	

=== CARS Pro Late Model Tour ===
(key)

CARS Pro Late Model Tour results
Year	Team	No.	Make	1	2	3	4	5	6	7	8	9	10	11	12	13	CPLMTC	Pts	Ref
2025	Rick Ware Racing	51	Ford	AAS	CDL; 17	OCS	ACE; 1*	NWS	CRW	HCY; 9	HCY	AND	FLC	SBO	TCM; 11	NWS	18th	135	
2026	Rick Ware Racing	51	Chevy	SNM; 8	NSV; 20	CRW; 8	ACE; 11	NWS; 12	HCY	AND	FLC	TCM	NPS	SBO			16th	152	

=== ASA STARS National Tour ===
(key) (Bold – Pole position awarded by qualifying time. Italics – Pole position earned by points standings or practice time. * – Most laps led. ** – All laps led.)

ASA STARS National Tour results
Year	Team	No.	Make	1	2	3	4	5	6	7	8	9	10	11	ASNTC	Pts	Ref
2026	Rick Ware Racing	51	Chevy	NSM	FIF	HCY; 20	SLG	MAD	NPS	OWO	TRI; Wth	WIN	NSV	NSM	-*	-*	

=== IHRA Pro Late Model Series ===
(key) (Bold – Pole position awarded by qualifying time. Italics – Pole position earned by points standings or practice time. * – Most laps led. ** – All laps led.)

IHRA Pro Late Model Series
Year	Team	No.	Make	1	2	3	ISCSS	Pts	Ref
2026	Rick Ware Racing	51	Chevy	DUB; Wth	CDL	AND	N/A	0	

=== Carolina Pro Late Model Series ===
(key) (Bold – Pole position awarded by qualifying time. Italics – Pole position earned by points standings or practice time. * – Most laps led. ** – All laps led.)

Carolina Pro Late Model Series results
Year	Team	No.	Make	1	2	3	4	5	6	7	8	9	CPLMSC	Pts	Ref
2024	Rick Ware Racing	51	Ford	CRW; 2	HCY; 6	OCS; 4	DIL; 2	DIL; 1	HCY; 3	HCY; 2	OCS; 5	HCY	3rd	846	
2026	Rick Ware Racing	51	Chevy	**HCY**; DSQ	**CRW**; 1*	HCY	OCS	HCY; 1	HCY	HCY; 4	HCY		-*	-*	
