= 2020 Contender Boats 250 =

NASCAR Xfinity Series race

Race details
- Race 10 of 33 in the 2020 NASCAR Xfinity Series season
- Date: June 14, 2020
- Location: Homestead–Miami Speedway in Homestead, Florida
- Course: Permanent racing facility
- Course length: 1.5 miles (2.414 km)
- Distance: 177 laps, 265.5 mi (427.281 km)
- Scheduled distance: 167 laps, 250.5 mi (403.141 km)

Pole position
Driver	Myatt Snider	RSS Racing
- Grid positions set by partial inversion of previous race's finishing order

Most laps led
Driver	Noah Gragson	JR Motorsports
- Laps: 81

Winner
No. 98	Chase Briscoe	Stewart-Haas Racing

Television in the United States
- Network: FS1
- Announcers: Adam Alexander, Jamie McMurray, and Michael Waltrip

Radio in the United States
- Radio: MRN
- Booth announcers: Dave Moody and Jeff Striegle
- Turn announcers: Mike Bagley (1 & 2) and Alex Hayden (3 & 4)

The 2020 Contender Boats 250 was a NASCAR Xfinity Series race held on June 14, 2020 at Homestead–Miami Speedway in Homestead, Florida. Contested over 177 laps—extended from 167 laps due to a double overtime finish—on the 1.5-mile (2.4 km) oval, it was the tenth race of the 2020 NASCAR Xfinity Series season and the season's second Dash 4 Cash race. Stewart-Haas Racing driver Chase Briscoe won his third race of the season.

The Contender Boats 250 replaced Iowa Speedway's first date for the 2020 Xfinity Series season due to the COVID-19 pandemic. It was the second race in two days for the Xfinity Series, following Friday's Hooters 250.

== Report ==
=== Background ===
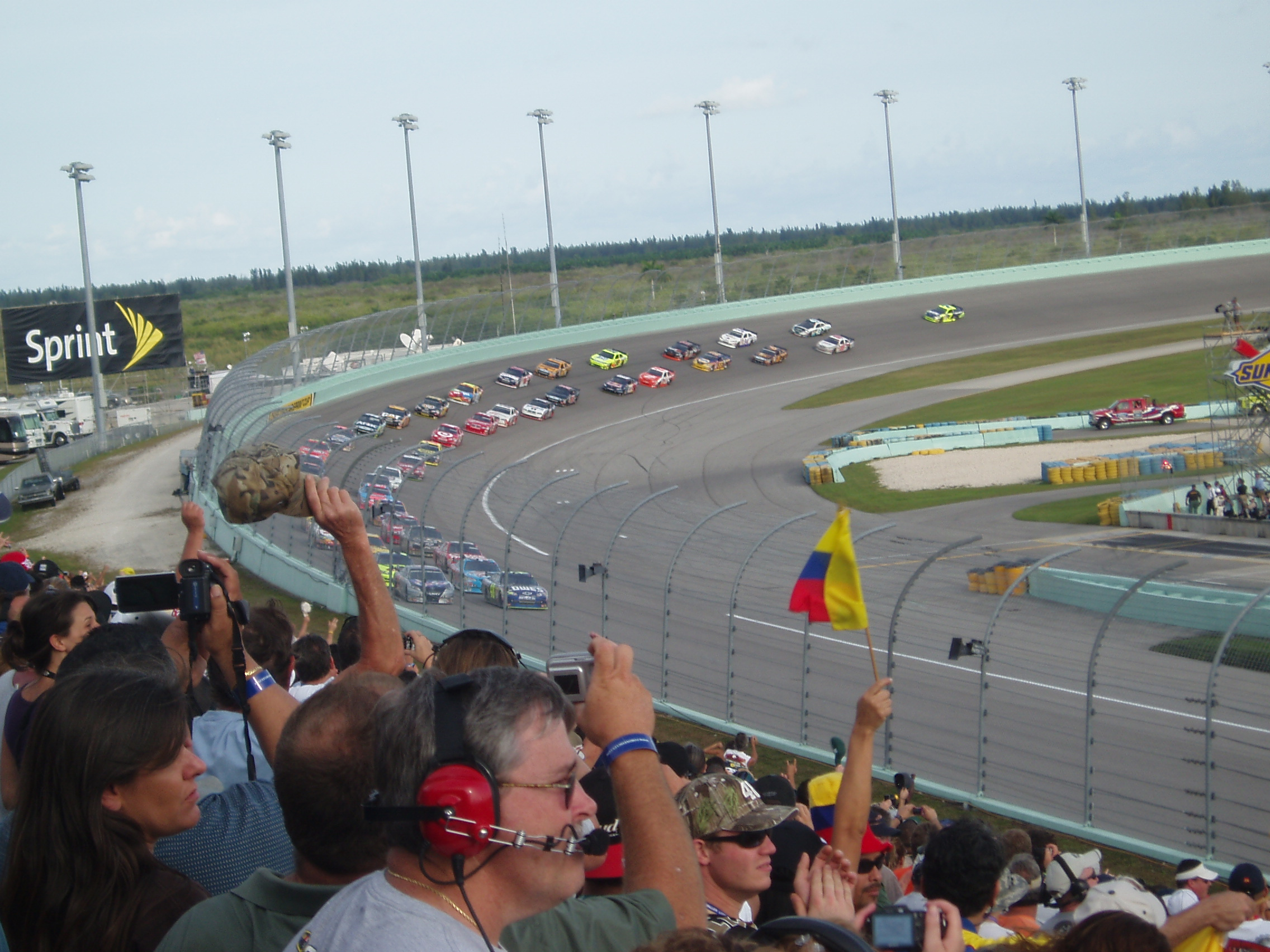
Homestead–Miami Speedway, the track where the race was held.

Homestead-Miami Speedway is a motor racing track located in Homestead, Florida. The track, which has several configurations, has promoted several series of racing, including NASCAR, the NTT IndyCar Series and the Grand-Am Rolex Sports Car Series

From 2002 to 2019, Homestead-Miami Speedway hosted the final race of the season in all three of NASCAR's series: the NASCAR Cup Series, Xfinity Series and Gander RV & Outdoors Truck Series.

The race was held without fans in attendance due to the ongoing COVID-19 pandemic.

=== Dash 4 Cash ===
The Dash 4 Cash is a series of four races in the NASCAR Xfinity Series, preceded by a qualifying race. The top four points-eligible drivers in the previous race are eligible to win a $100,000 bonus on top of their race winnings if they win the race. Cup Series regulars are not permitted to compete in the races.

The Contender Boats 250 was the season's second Dash 4 Cash race. A. J. Allmendinger, Noah Gragson, Justin Haley, and Daniel Hemric were eligible to win after finishing in the top 4 at the EchoPark 250 at Atlanta.

=== Entry list ===
- (R) denotes rookie driver.
- (i) denotes driver who is ineligible for series driver points.

No.	Driver	Team	Manufacturer	Sponsor
0	Jeffrey Earnhardt	JD Motorsports	Chevrolet	EcoVirux
1	Michael Annett	JR Motorsports	Chevrolet	Pilot, Flying J
02	Brett Moffitt (i)	Our Motorsports	Chevrolet	Our Motorsports
4	Jesse Little (R)	JD Motorsports	Chevrolet	Series Seating, KDST CPA
5	Matt Mills	B. J. McLeod Motorsports	Chevrolet	J. F. Electric
6	B. J. McLeod	JD Motorsports	Chevrolet	KDST CPA
7	Justin Allgaier	JR Motorsports	Chevrolet	Brandt Professional Agriculture "Thank You FARMERS for feeding the WORLD"
07	Carson Ware	SS-Green Light Racing	Chevrolet	Jacob Companies
8	Daniel Hemric	JR Motorsports	Chevrolet	Poppy Bank
08	Joe Graf Jr. (R)	SS-Green Light Racing	Chevrolet	Bucked Up Energy
9	Noah Gragson	JR Motorsports	Chevrolet	PUBG Mobile
10	Ross Chastain	Kaulig Racing	Chevrolet	Nutrien Ag Solutions
11	Justin Haley	Kaulig Racing	Chevrolet	Leaf Filter Gutter Protection
13	Chad Finchum	MBM Motorsports	Toyota	James Carter Attorney At Law, CrashClaimsR.Us
15	Colby Howard	JD Motorsports	Chevrolet	Sany
16	A. J. Allmendinger	Kaulig Racing	Chevrolet	Ellsworth Advisors
18	Riley Herbst (R)	Joe Gibbs Racing	Toyota	Monster Energy
19	Brandon Jones	Joe Gibbs Racing	Toyota	Menards, Fisher "Oven Roasted Never Fried"
20	Harrison Burton (R)	Joe Gibbs Racing	Toyota	DEX Imaging
21	Anthony Alfredo	Richard Childress Racing	Chevrolet	IRacing
22	Austin Cindric	Team Penske	Ford	PPG Industries
26	Colin Garrett	Sam Hunt Racing	Toyota	The Rosie Network, Racing For Heroes
36	Alex Labbé	DGM Racing	Chevrolet	Rousseau Automotive, Globocam
39	Ryan Sieg	RSS Racing	Chevrolet	CMRRoofing.com
44	Tommy Joe Martins	Martins Motorsports	Chevrolet	Gilreath Farms Red Angus "The New Black"
47	Kyle Weatherman	Mike Harmon Racing	Chevrolet	#BackTheBlue
51	Jeremy Clements	Jeremy Clements Racing	Chevrolet	Fly & Form Structures
52	Kody Vanderwal (R)	Means Racing	Chevrolet	Means Racing
61	Timmy Hill (i)	Hattori Racing	Toyota	RoofClaim.com
66	Stephen Leicht	MBM Motorsports	Toyota	Jani-King
68	Brandon Brown	Brandonbilt Motorsports	Chevrolet	Brandonbilt Motorsports
74	Bayley Currey (i)	Mike Harmon Racing	Chevrolet	Mutt And Jeff Porkskins
78	Vinnie Miller	B. J. McLeod Motorsports	Chevrolet	Koolbox ICE
90	Caesar Bacarella	DGM Racing	Chevrolet	Maxim, Alpha Prime
92	Josh Williams	DGM Racing	Chevrolet	Starbrite, Startron
93	Myatt Snider	RSS Racing	Chevrolet	Louisiana Hot Sauce
98	Chase Briscoe	Stewart-Haas Racing	Ford	Ford Performance Racing School GT350 Track Attack
99	Stefan Parsons	B. J. McLeod Motorsports	Toyota	RacingJobs.com
Official entry list				

== Qualifying ==
Myatt Snider was awarded the pole for the race as determined by the top 15 from Saturday's finishing order inverted.

=== Starting Lineup ===
Pos	No	Driver	Team	Manufacturer
1	93	Myatt Snider	RSS Racing	Chevrolet
2	68	Brandon Brown	Brandonbilt Motorsports	Chevrolet
3	11	Justin Haley	Kaulig Racing	Chevrolet
4	51	Jeremy Clements	Jeremy Clements Racing	Chevrolet
5	07	Carson Ware	SS-Green Light Racing	Chevrolet
6	18	Riley Herbst (R)	Joe Gibbs Racing	Toyota
7	10	Ross Chastain	Kaulig Racing	Chevrolet
8	19	Brandon Jones	Joe Gibbs Racing	Toyota
9	98	Chase Briscoe	Stewart-Haas Racing	Ford
10	1	Michael Annett	JR Motorsports	Chevrolet
11	8	Daniel Hemric	JR Motorsports	Chevrolet
12	21	Anthony Alfredo	Richard Childress Racing	Chevrolet
13	9	Noah Gragson	JR Motorsports	Chevrolet
14	22	Austin Cindric	Team Penske	Ford
15	20	Harrison Burton (R)	Joe Gibbs Racing	Toyota
16	08	Joe Graf Jr. (R)	SS-Green Light Racing	Chevrolet
17	15	Colby Howard	JD Motorsports	Chevrolet
18	4	Jesse Little (R)	JD Motorsports	Chevrolet
19	0	Jeffrey Earnhardt	JD Motorsports	Chevrolet
20	92	Josh Williams	DGM Racing	Chevrolet
21	26	Colin Garrett	Sam Hunt Racing	Toyota
22	99	Stefan Parsons	B. J. McLeod Motorsports	Toyota
23	61	Timmy Hill (i)	Hattori Racing	Toyota
24	74	Bayley Currey (i)	Mike Harmon Racing	Chevrolet
25	36	Alex Labbé	DGM Racing	Chevrolet
26	6	B. J. McLeod	JD Motorsports	Chevrolet
27	5	Matt Mills	B. J. McLeod Motorsports	Chevrolet
28	39	Ryan Sieg	RSS Racing	Chevrolet
29	90	Caesar Bacarella	DGM Racing	Chevrolet
30	13	Chad Finchum	MBM Motorsports	Toyota
31	44	Tommy Joe Martins	Martins Motorsports	Chevrolet
32	7	Justin Allgaier	JR Motorsports	Chevrolet
33	47	Kyle Weatherman	Mike Harmon Racing	Chevrolet
34	78	Vinnie Miller	B. J. McLeod Motorsports	Chevrolet
35	02	Jairo Avila Jr.	Our Motorsports	Chevrolet
36	66	Stephen Leicht	MBM Motorsports	Toyota
37	52	Kody Vanderwal (R)	Means Racing	Chevrolet
38	16	A. J. Allmendinger	Kaulig Racing	Chevrolet
Official starting lineup

- . – Eligible for Dash 4 Cash prize money.
- The No. 8, No. 07, and No. 02 had to start from the rear due to a driver change from Saturday's race.
- The No. 7, No. 02, and No. 52 had to start from the rear due to using a backup car.
- The No. 9 had to start from the rear due to unapproved adjustments.

== Race ==
=== Race results ===
==== Stage Results ====
Stage One

Laps: 40

Pos	No	Driver	Team	Manufacturer	Points
1	39	Ryan Sieg	RSS Racing	Chevrolet	10
2	1	Michael Annett	JR Motorsports	Chevrolet	9
3	22	Austin Cindric	Team Penske	Ford	8
4	19	Brandon Jones	Joe Gibbs Racing	Toyota	7
5	7	Justin Allgaier	JR Motorsports	Chevrolet	6
6	9	Noah Gragson	JR Motorsports	Chevrolet	5
7	20	Harrison Burton (R)	Joe Gibbs Racing	Toyota	4
8	8	Daniel Hemric	JR Motorsports	Chevrolet	3
9	61	Timmy Hill (i)	Hattori Racing	Toyota	0
10	74	Bayley Currey (i)	Mike Harmon Racing	Chevrolet	0

Stage Two

Laps: 40

Pos	No	Driver	Team	Manufacturer	Points
1	9	Noah Gragson	JR Motorsports	Chevrolet	10
2	22	Austin Cindric	Team Penske	Ford	9
3	19	Brandon Jones	Joe Gibbs Racing	Toyota	8
4	98	Chase Briscoe	Stewart-Haas Racing	Ford	7
5	8	Daniel Hemric	JR Motorsports	Chevrolet	6
6	20	Harrison Burton (R)	Joe Gibbs Racing	Toyota	5
7	7	Justin Allgaier	JR Motorsports	Chevrolet	4
8	1	Michael Annett	JR Motorsports	Chevrolet	3
9	21	Anthony Alfredo	Richard Childress Racing	Chevrolet	2
10	16	A. J. Allmendinger	Kaulig Racing	Chevrolet	1

=== Final Stage Results ===
Laps: 87

Pos	Grid	No	Driver	Team	Manufacturer	Laps	Points	Status
1	9	98	Chase Briscoe	Stewart-Haas Racing	Ford	177	47	Running
2	8	19	Brandon Jones	Joe Gibbs Racing	Toyota	177	50	Running
3	7	10	Ross Chastain	Kaulig Racing	Chevrolet	177	34	Running
4	38	16	A. J. Allmendinger	Kaulig Racing	Chevrolet	177	34	Running
5	13	9	Noah Gragson	JR Motorsports	Chevrolet	177	47	Running
6	3	11	Justin Haley	Kaulig Racing	Chevrolet	177	31	Running
7	1	93	Myatt Snider	RSS Racing	Chevrolet	177	30	Running
8	15	20	Harrison Burton (R)	Joe Gibbs Racing	Toyota	177	38	Running
9	6	18	Riley Herbst (R)	Joe Gibbs Racing	Toyota	177	28	Running
10	14	22	Austin Cindric	Team Penske	Ford	176	44	Running
11	12	21	Anthony Alfredo	Richard Childress Racing	Chevrolet	176	28	Running
12	20	92	Josh Williams	DGM Racing	Chevrolet	176	25	Running
13	16	08	Joe Graf Jr. (R)	SS-Green Light Racing	Chevrolet	176	24	Running
14	21	26	Colin Garrett	Sam Hunt Racing	Toyota	176	23	Running
15	18	4	Jesse Little (R)	JD Motorsports	Chevrolet	176	22	Running
16	19	0	Jeffrey Earnhardt	JD Motorsports	Chevrolet	176	21	Running
17	17	15	Colby Howard	JD Motorsports	Chevrolet	176	20	Running
18	10	1	Michael Annett	JR Motorsports	Chevrolet	176	31	Running
19	28	39	Ryan Sieg	RSS Racing	Chevrolet	175	28	Running
20	31	44	Tommy Joe Martins	Martins Motorsports	Chevrolet	175	17	Running
21	30	13	Chad Finchum	MBM Motorsports	Toyota	175	16	Running
22	32	7	Justin Allgaier	JR Motorsports	Chevrolet	174	25	Running
23	25	36	Alex Labbé	DGM Racing	Chevrolet	174	14	Running
24	27	5	Matt Mills	B. J. McLeod Motorsports	Chevrolet	174	13	Running
25	23	61	Timmy Hill (i)	Hattori Racing	Toyota	174	0	Running
26	24	74	Bayley Currey (i)	Mike Harmon Racing	Chevrolet	173	0	Running
27	4	51	Jeremy Clements	Jeremy Clements Racing	Chevrolet	173	10	Running
28	5	07	Carson Ware	SS-Green Light Racing	Chevrolet	173	9	Running
29	34	78	Vinnie Miller	B. J. McLeod Motorsports	Chevrolet	173	8	Running
30	29	90	Caesar Bacarella	DGM Racing	Chevrolet	171	7	Running
31	11	8	Daniel Hemric	JR Motorsports	Chevrolet	170	15	Accident
32	22	99	Stefan Parsons	B. J. McLeod Motorsports	Toyota	151	5	Running
33	37	52	Kody Vanderwal (R)	Means Racing	Chevrolet	138	4	Power
34	26	6	B. J. McLeod	JD Motorsports	Chevrolet	117	3	Clutch
35	33	47	Kyle Weatherman	Mike Harmon Racing	Chevrolet	84	2	Fire
36	2	68	Brandon Brown	Brandonbilt Motorsports	Chevrolet	49	1	Overheating
37	35	02	Jairo Avila Jr.	Our Motorsports	Chevrolet	15	1	Electrical
38	36	66	Stephen Leicht	MBM Motorsports	Toyota	9	1	Handling
Official race results

- . – Won the Dash 4 Cash prize money and subsequently qualified for the Dash 4 Cash prize money in the next race.
- . – Qualified for Dash 4 Cash prize money in the next race.

=== Race statistics ===
- Lead changes: 20 among 8 different drivers
- Cautions/Laps: 6 for 28
- Red flags: 0
- Time of race: 2 hours, 15 minutes, 52 seconds
- Average speed: 117.247 mph (188.691 km/h)

== Media ==
=== Television ===
The Contender Boats 250 was carried by FS1 in the United States. Adam Alexander, Jamie McMurray, and Michael Waltrip called the race from the Fox Sports Studio in Charlotte, with Regan Smith covering pit road.

FS1
Booth announcers	Pit reporter
Lap-by-lap: Adam Alexander Color-commentator: Jamie McMurray Color-commentator: Michael Waltrip	Regan Smith

=== Radio ===
The Motor Racing Network (MRN) called the race for radio, which was simulcast on SiriusXM NASCAR Radio. Dave Moody and Jeff Striegle anchored the action from the booth. Mike Bagley called the race from turns 1 & 2 and Alex Hayden called the action through turns 3 & 4. NASCAR Hall of Fame Executive Director Winston Kelley and Steve Post provided reports from pit road.

MRN Radio
Booth announcers	Turn announcers	Pit reporters
Lead announcer: Dave Moody Announcer: Jeff Striegle	Turns 1 & 2: Mike Bagley Turns 3 & 4: Alex Hayden	Winston Kelley Steve Post

== Standings after the race ==
Drivers' Championship standings

	Pos	Driver	Points
	1	Noah Gragson	435
	2	Chase Briscoe	417 (-18)
	3	Harrison Burton (R)	390 (-45)
1	4	Austin Cindric	380 (-55)
1	5	Ross Chastain	374 (-61)
2	6	Brandon Jones	345 (-90)
	7	Justin Haley	330 (-105)
2	8	Justin Allgaier	328 (-107)
	9	Ryan Sieg	266 (-169)
	10	Michael Annett	260 (-175)
	11	Riley Herbst (R)	256 (-179)
	12	Daniel Hemric	237 (-198)
Official driver's standings

- Note: Only the first 12 positions are included for the driver standings.
- . – Driver has clinched a position in the NASCAR playoffs.

Previous race: 2020 Hooters 250	NASCAR Xfinity Series; 2020 season	Next race: 2020 Unhinged 300
