= 2020 Cheddar's 300 =

NASCAR Xfinity Series race

Race details
- Race 7 of 33 in the 2020 NASCAR Xfinity Series season
- Date: June 1, 2020
- Location: Bristol Motor Speedway in Bristol, Tennessee
- Course: Permanent racing facility
- Course length: 0.533 miles (0.858 km)
- Distance: 303 laps, 161.499 mi (259.907 km)
- Scheduled distance: 300 laps, 159.9 mi (257.334 km)

Pole position
Driver	Harrison Burton	Joe Gibbs Racing
- Grid positions set by ballot

Most laps led
Driver	Justin Allgaier	JR Motorsports
- Laps: 156

Winner
No. 9	Noah Gragson	JR Motorsports

Television in the United States
- Network: FS1
- Announcers: Adam Alexander, Kurt Busch, and Kyle Busch

Radio in the United States
- Radio: PRN
- Booth announcers: Doug Rice and Mark Garrow
- Turn announcers: Rob Albright (Backstretch)

The 2020 Cheddar's 300, branded as Cheddar's 300 presented by Alsco, was a NASCAR Xfinity Series race held on June 1, 2020—postponed from May 30 due to weather—at Bristol Motor Speedway in Bristol, Tennessee. Contested over 303 laps—extended from 300 laps due to an overtime finish, on the 0.533-mile (0.858 km) concrete short track, it was the seventh race of the 2020 NASCAR Xfinity Series season. Additionally, it was the qualifier for the season's first Dash 4 Cash race. JR Motorsports driver Noah Gragson took home his second win of the season.

The race was originally scheduled to be held on April 4, but was rescheduled due to the COVID-19 pandemic. In turn, the race was postponed from May 30 due to inclement weather.

== Report ==
=== Background ===
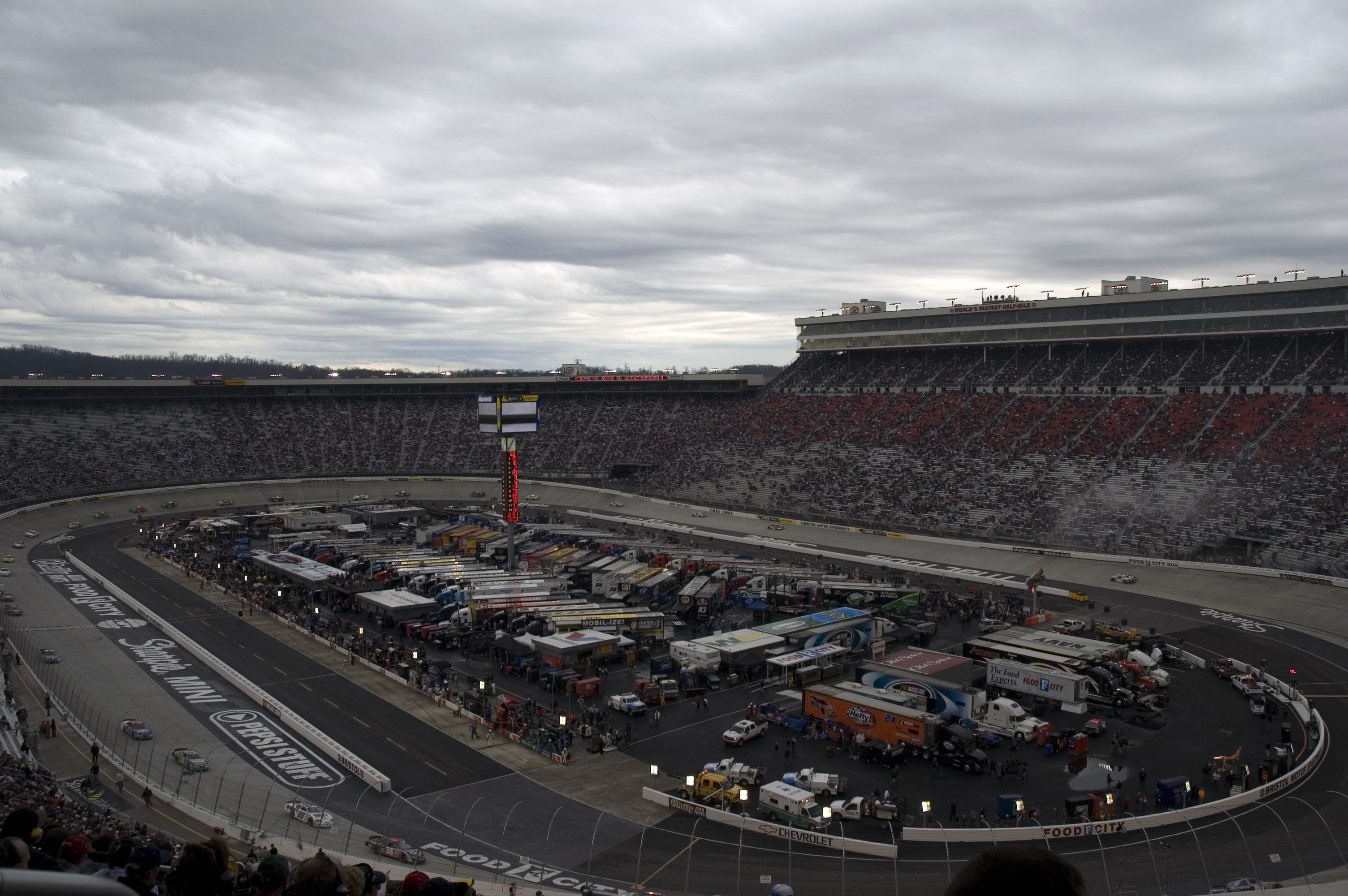
Bristol Motor Speedway, where the race was held.

Bristol Motor Speedway, formerly known as Bristol International Raceway and Bristol Raceway, is a NASCAR short track venue located in Bristol, Tennessee. Constructed in 1960, it held its first NASCAR race on July 30, 1961. Despite its short length, Bristol is among the most popular tracks on the NASCAR schedule because of its distinct features, which include extraordinarily steep banking, an all concrete surface, two pit roads, and stadium-like seating.

The race was held without fans in attendance due to the ongoing COVID-19 pandemic.

=== Dash 4 Cash ===
The Dash 4 Cash is a series of four races in the NASCAR Xfinity Series, preceded by a qualifying race. The top four points-eligible drivers in the previous race are eligible to win a $100,000 bonus on top of their race winnings if they win the race. Cup Series regulars are not permitted to compete in the races.

The Cheddar's 300 served as the qualifier for the season's first Dash 4 Cash race at Atlanta Motor Speedway on June 6.

=== Entry list ===
- (R) denotes rookie driver.
- (i) denotes driver who is ineligible for series driver points.

No.	Driver	Team	Manufacturer
0	Jeffrey Earnhardt	JD Motorsports	Chevrolet
1	Michael Annett	JR Motorsports	Chevrolet
02	Patrick Emerling	Our Motorsports	Chevrolet
4	Jesse Little (R)	JD Motorsports	Chevrolet
5	Matt Mills	B. J. McLeod Motorsports	Chevrolet
6	B. J. McLeod	JD Motorsports	Chevrolet
7	Justin Allgaier	JR Motorsports	Chevrolet
07	Carson Ware	SS-Green Light Racing	Chevrolet
8	Daniel Hemric	JR Motorsports	Chevrolet
08	Joe Graf Jr. (R)	SS-Green Light Racing	Chevrolet
9	Noah Gragson	JR Motorsports	Chevrolet
10	Ross Chastain	Kaulig Racing	Chevrolet
11	Justin Haley	Kaulig Racing	Chevrolet
13	Chad Finchum	MBM Motorsports	Toyota
15	Colby Howard	JD Motorsports	Chevrolet
16	A. J. Allmendinger	Kaulig Racing	Chevrolet
18	Riley Herbst (R)	Joe Gibbs Racing	Toyota
19	Brandon Jones	Joe Gibbs Racing	Toyota
20	Harrison Burton (R)	Joe Gibbs Racing	Toyota
21	Myatt Snider	Richard Childress Racing	Chevrolet
22	Austin Cindric	Team Penske	Ford
36	Alex Labbé	DGM Racing	Chevrolet
39	Ryan Sieg	RSS Racing	Chevrolet
44	Tommy Joe Martins	Martins Motorsports	Chevrolet
47	Joe Nemechek (i)	Mike Harmon Racing	Chevrolet
51	Jeremy Clements	Jeremy Clements Racing	Chevrolet
52	Kody Vanderwal (R)	Means Racing	Chevrolet
61	Timmy Hill (i)	Hattori Racing	Toyota
66	Stephen Leicht	MBM Motorsports	Toyota
68	Brandon Brown	Brandonbilt Motorsports	Chevrolet
74	Bayley Currey (i)	Mike Harmon Racing	Chevrolet
78	Vinnie Miller	B. J. McLeod Motorsports	Chevrolet
90	Ronnie Bassett Jr.	DGM Racing	Chevrolet
92	Josh Williams	DGM Racing	Chevrolet
93	Jeff Green	RSS Racing	Chevrolet
98	Chase Briscoe	Stewart-Haas Racing	Ford
99	Mason Massey	B. J. McLeod Motorsports	Toyota
Official entry list

== Qualifying ==
Harrison Burton was awarded the pole for the race as determined by a random draw.

=== Starting Lineup ===
Pos	No	Driver	Team	Manufacturer
1	20	Harrison Burton (R)	Joe Gibbs Racing	Toyota
2	19	Brandon Jones	Joe Gibbs Racing	Toyota
3	22	Austin Cindric	Team Penske	Ford
4	11	Justin Haley	Kaulig Racing	Chevrolet
5	39	Ryan Sieg	RSS Racing	Chevrolet
6	10	Ross Chastain	Kaulig Racing	Chevrolet
7	18	Riley Herbst (R)	Joe Gibbs Racing	Toyota
8	8	Daniel Hemric	JR Motorsports	Chevrolet
9	9	Noah Gragson	JR Motorsports	Chevrolet
10	7	Justin Allgaier	JR Motorsports	Chevrolet
11	98	Chase Briscoe	Stewart-Haas Racing	Ford
12	1	Michael Annett	JR Motorsports	Chevrolet
13	07	Carson Ware	SS-Green Light Racing	Chevrolet
14	78	Vinnie Miller	B. J. McLeod Motorsports	Chevrolet
15	4	Jesse Little (R)	JD Motorsports	Chevrolet
16	93	Jeff Green	RSS Racing	Chevrolet
17	13	Chad Finchum	MBM Motorsports	Toyota
18	0	Jeffrey Earnhardt	JD Motorsports	Chevrolet
19	90	Ronnie Bassett Jr.	DGM Racing	Chevrolet
20	02	Patrick Emerling	Our Motorsports	Chevrolet
21	68	Brandon Brown	Brandonbilt Motorsports	Chevrolet
22	21	Myatt Snider	Richard Childress Racing	Chevrolet
23	92	Josh Williams	DGM Racing	Chevrolet
24	6	B. J. McLeod	JD Motorsports	Chevrolet
25	61	Timmy Hill (i)	Hattori Racing	Toyota
26	15	Colby Howard	JD Motorsports	Chevrolet
27	16	A. J. Allmendinger	Kaulig Racing	Chevrolet
28	47	Joe Nemechek (i)	Mike Harmon Racing	Chevrolet
29	51	Jeremy Clements	Jeremy Clements Racing	Chevrolet
30	52	Kody Vanderwal (R)	Means Racing	Chevrolet
31	5	Matt Mills	B. J. McLeod Motorsports	Chevrolet
32	36	Alex Labbé	DGM Racing	Chevrolet
33	74	Bayley Currey (i)	Mike Harmon Racing	Chevrolet
34	99	Mason Massey	B. J. McLeod Motorsports	Toyota
35	44	Tommy Joe Martins	Martins Motorsports	Chevrolet
36	08	Joe Graf Jr. (R)	SS-Green Light Racing	Chevrolet
37	66	Stephen Leicht	MBM Motorsports	Toyota
Official starting lineup

- The No. 07 of Carson Ware had to start from the rear due to unapproved adjustments. The No. 99 of Mason Massey also had to start from the back.

== Race ==
=== Race results ===
==== Stage Results ====
Stage One

Laps: 85

Pos	No	Driver	Team	Manufacturer	Points
1	9	Noah Gragson	JR Motorsports	Chevrolet	10
2	7	Justin Allgaier	JR Motorsports	Chevrolet	9
3	98	Chase Briscoe	Stewart-Haas Racing	Ford	8
4	11	Justin Haley	Kaulig Racing	Chevrolet	7
5	8	Daniel Hemric	JR Motorsports	Chevrolet	6
6	18	Riley Herbst (R)	Joe Gibbs Racing	Toyota	5
7	19	Brandon Jones	Joe Gibbs Racing	Toyota	4
8	16	A. J. Allmendinger	Kaulig Racing	Chevrolet	3
9	39	Ryan Sieg	RSS Racing	Chevrolet	2
10	21	Myatt Snider	Richard Childress Racing	Chevrolet	1

Stage Two

Laps: 85

Pos	No	Driver	Team	Manufacturer	Points
1	7	Justin Allgaier	JR Motorsports	Chevrolet	10
2	9	Noah Gragson	JR Motorsports	Chevrolet	9
3	11	Justin Haley	Kaulig Racing	Chevrolet	8
4	20	Harrison Burton (R)	Joe Gibbs Racing	Toyota	7
5	98	Chase Briscoe	Stewart-Haas Racing	Ford	6
6	19	Brandon Jones	Joe Gibbs Racing	Toyota	5
7	8	Daniel Hemric	JR Motorsports	Chevrolet	4
8	21	Myatt Snider	Richard Childress Racing	Chevrolet	3
9	18	Riley Herbst (R)	Joe Gibbs Racing	Toyota	2
10	16	A. J. Allmendinger	Kaulig Racing	Chevrolet	1

=== Final Stage Results ===
Laps: 130

Pos	Grid	No	Driver	Team	Manufacturer	Laps	Points	Status
1	9	9	Noah Gragson	JR Motorsports	Chevrolet	303	59	Running
2	11	98	Chase Briscoe	Stewart-Haas Racing	Ford	303	49	Running
3	2	19	Brandon Jones	Joe Gibbs Racing	Toyota	303	43	Running
4	1	20	Harrison Burton (R)	Joe Gibbs Racing	Toyota	303	40	Running
5	22	21	Myatt Snider	Richard Childress Racing	Chevrolet	303	36	Running
6	8	8	Daniel Hemric	JR Motorsports	Chevrolet	303	41	Running
7	21	68	Brandon Brown	Brandonbilt Motorsports	Chevrolet	303	30	Running
8	29	51	Jeremy Clements	Jeremy Clements Racing	Chevrolet	303	29	Running
9	23	92	Josh Williams	DGM Racing	Chevrolet	303	28	Running
10	27	16	A. J. Allmendinger	Kaulig Racing	Chevrolet	303	31	Running
11	24	6	B. J. McLeod	JD Motorsports	Chevrolet	303	26	Running
12	14	78	Vinnie Miller	B. J. McLeod Motorsports	Chevrolet	303	25	Running
13	36	08	Joe Graf Jr. (R)	SS-Green Light Racing	Chevrolet	303	24	Running
14	25	61	Timmy Hill (i)	Hattori Racing	Toyota	303	0	Running
15	18	0	Jeffrey Earnhardt	JD Motorsports	Chevrolet	301	22	Running
16	5	39	Ryan Sieg	RSS Racing	Chevrolet	300	23	Running
17	4	11	Justin Haley	Kaulig Racing	Chevrolet	299	35	Running
18	10	7	Justin Allgaier	JR Motorsports	Chevrolet	297	38	Accident
19	26	15	Colby Howard	JD Motorsports	Chevrolet	296	18	Running
20	33	74	Bayley Currey (i)	Mike Harmon Racing	Chevrolet	295	0	Running
21	30	52	Kody Vanderwal (R)	Means Racing	Chevrolet	293	16	Running
22	13	07	Carson Ware	SS-Green Light Racing	Chevrolet	289	15	Running
23	35	44	Tommy Joe Martins	Martins Motorsports	Chevrolet	284	14	Running
24	17	13	Chad Finchum	MBM Motorsports	Toyota	277	13	Running
25	31	5	Matt Mills	B. J. McLeod Motorsports	Chevrolet	268	12	Clutch
26	15	4	Jesse Little (R)	JD Motorsports	Chevrolet	260	11	Running
27	7	18	Riley Herbst (R)	Joe Gibbs Racing	Toyota	256	17	Accident
28	6	10	Ross Chastain	Kaulig Racing	Chevrolet	255	9	Running
29	20	02	Patrick Emerling	Our Motorsports	Chevrolet	140	8	Accident
30	34	99	Mason Massey	B. J. McLeod Motorsports	Toyota	111	7	Running
31	19	90	Ronnie Bassett Jr.	DGM Racing	Chevrolet	77	6	Engine
32	28	47	Joe Nemechek (i)	Mike Harmon Racing	Chevrolet	69	0	Accident
33	32	36	Alex Labbé	DGM Racing	Chevrolet	41	4	Overheating
34	37	66	Stephen Leicht	MBM Motorsports	Toyota	23	3	Suspension
35	16	93	Jeff Green	RSS Racing	Chevrolet	19	2	Ignition
36	3	22	Austin Cindric	Team Penske	Ford	8	1	Accident
37	12	1	Michael Annett	JR Motorsports	Chevrolet	5	1	Accident
Official race results

=== Race statistics ===
- Lead changes: 10 among 6 different drivers
- Cautions/Laps: 12 for 85
- Red flags: 1
- Time of race: 2 hours, 19 minutes, 3 seconds
- Average speed: 69.687 mph (112.150 km/h)

== Media ==
=== Television ===
The Cheddar's 300 was carried by FS1 in the United States. Adam Alexander and the Busch brothers (Kurt & Kyle Busch) called the race from the Fox Sports Studio in Charlotte, with Regan Smith covering pit road.

FS1
Booth announcers	Pit reporter
Lap-by-lap: Adam Alexander Color-commentator: Kurt Busch Color-commentator: Kyle Busch	Regan Smith

=== Radio ===
The Performance Racing Network (PRN) called the race for radio, which was simulcast on SiriusXM NASCAR Radio. Doug Rice and Mark Garrow anchored the action from the booth and Rob Albright called the race from the backstretch. Brad Gillie, Brett McMillan, and Wendy Venturini provided reports from pit road.

PRN Radio
Booth announcers	Turn announcers	Pit reporters
Lead announcer: Doug Rice Announcer: Mark Garrow	Backstretch: Rob Albright	Brad Gillie Brett McMillan Wendy Venturini

== Standings after the race ==
Drivers' Championship standings

	Pos	Driver	Points
	1	Chase Briscoe	300
3	2	Noah Gragson	291 (-9)
1	3	Harrison Burton (R)	274 (-26)
2	4	Justin Allgaier	256 (-44)
2	5	Ross Chastain	248 (-52)
4	6	Austin Cindric	244 (-56)
1	7	Brandon Jones	229 (-71)
1	8	Justin Haley	221 (-79)
2	9	Ryan Sieg	215 (-2)
1	10	Riley Herbst (R)	177 (-123)
2	11	Daniel Hemric	176 (-124)
	12	Brandon Brown	174 (-126)
Official driver's standings

- Note: Only the first 12 positions are included for the driver standings.
- . – Driver has clinched a position in the NASCAR playoffs.

Previous race: 2020 Alsco 300 (Charlotte)	NASCAR Xfinity Series; 2020 season	Next race: 2020 EchoPark 250
