= 2025 Bennett Transportation & Logistics 250 =

2nd race of the 2025 NASCAR Xfinity Series

Race details
- Race 2 of 33 of the 2025 NASCAR Xfinity Series
- Date: February 22, 2025
- Official name: 34th Annual Bennett Transportation & Logistics 250
- Location: Atlanta Motor Speedway in Hampton, Georgia
- Course: Permanent racing facility
- Course length: 1.54 miles (2.48 km)
- Distance: 163 laps, 251 mi (404 km)
- Scheduled distance: 163 laps, 251 mi (404 km)
- Average speed: 106.590 mph (171.540 km/h)

Pole position
Driver	Jesse Love	Richard Childress Racing
- Time: 31.730

Most laps led
Driver	Austin Hill	Richard Childress Racing
- Laps: 146

Winner
No. 21	Austin Hill	Richard Childress Racing

Television in the United States
- Network: The CW
- Announcers: Adam Alexander, Jamie McMurray, and Parker Kligerman

Radio in the United States
- Radio: PRN

The 2025 Bennett Transportation & Logistics 250 was the 2nd stock car race of the 2025 NASCAR Xfinity Series, and the 34th iteration of the event. The race was held on Saturday, February 22, 2025, at Atlanta Motor Speedway in Hampton, Georgia, a 1.54 miles (2.48 km) permanent asphalt quad-oval shaped intermediate speedway (with superspeedway rules). The race took the scheduled 163 laps to complete.

Austin Hill, driving for Richard Childress Racing, would continue to be an unstoppable force at superspeedways, winning both stages and leading a race-high 146 laps to earn his 11th career NASCAR Xfinity Series win, his first of the season, and his third consecutive win in the first Atlanta race. To fill out the podium, Justin Allgaier, driving for JR Motorsports, and Aric Almirola, driving for Joe Gibbs Racing, would finish 2nd and 3rd, respectively.

Along with his win, Hill tied Dale Earnhardt Jr. and Tony Stewart for the most wins on superspeedways in series history with eight.

== Report ==
=== Background ===
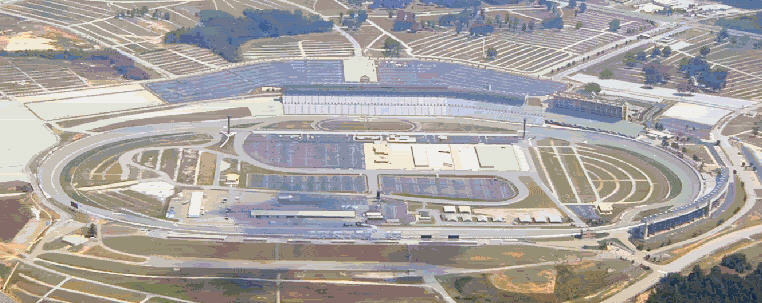
Atlanta Motor Speedway, the circuit where the race will be held.

Atlanta Motor Speedway is a 1.54-mile race track in Hampton, Georgia, United States, 20 miles (32 km) south of Atlanta. It has annually hosted NASCAR Xfinity Series stock car races since 1992.

The venue was bought by Speedway Motorsports in 1990. In 1994, 46 condominiums were built over the northeastern side of the track. In 1997, to standardize the track with Speedway Motorsports' other two intermediate ovals, the entire track was almost completely rebuilt. The frontstretch and backstretch were swapped, and the configuration of the track was changed from oval to quad-oval, with a new official length of 1.54-mile (2.48 km) where before it was 1.522-mile (2.449 km). The project made the track one of the fastest on the NASCAR circuit. In July 2021 NASCAR announced that the track would be reprofiled for the 2022 season to have 28 degrees of banking and would be narrowed from 55 to 40 feet which the track claims will turn racing at the track similar to restrictor plate superspeedways. Despite the reprofiling being criticized by drivers, construction began in August 2021 and wrapped up in December 2021. The track has seating capacity of 71,000 to 125,000 people depending on the tracks configuration.

==== Entry list ====
- (R) denotes rookie driver.

#	Driver	Team	Make
00	Sheldon Creed	Haas Factory Team	Ford
1	Carson Kvapil (R)	JR Motorsports	Chevrolet
2	Jesse Love	Richard Childress Racing	Chevrolet
4	Parker Retzlaff	Alpha Prime Racing	Chevrolet
5	Kris Wright	Our Motorsports	Chevrolet
07	Nick Leitz	SS-Green Light Racing	Chevrolet
7	Justin Allgaier	JR Motorsports	Chevrolet
8	Sammy Smith	JR Motorsports	Chevrolet
10	Daniel Dye (R)	Kaulig Racing	Chevrolet
11	Josh Williams	Kaulig Racing	Chevrolet
14	Garrett Smithley	SS-Green Light Racing	Chevrolet
16	Christian Eckes (R)	Kaulig Racing	Chevrolet
18	William Sawalich (R)	Joe Gibbs Racing	Toyota
19	Aric Almirola	Joe Gibbs Racing	Toyota
20	Brandon Jones	Joe Gibbs Racing	Toyota
21	Austin Hill	Richard Childress Racing	Chevrolet
25	Harrison Burton	AM Racing	Ford
26	Dean Thompson (R)	Sam Hunt Racing	Toyota
27	Jeb Burton	Jordan Anderson Racing	Chevrolet
28	Kyle Sieg	RSS Racing	Ford
31	Blaine Perkins	Jordan Anderson Racing	Chevrolet
35	Joey Gase	Joey Gase Motorsports	Chevrolet
39	Ryan Sieg	RSS Racing	Ford
41	Sam Mayer	Haas Factory Team	Ford
42	Anthony Alfredo	Young's Motorsports	Chevrolet
44	Brennan Poole	Alpha Prime Racing	Chevrolet
45	Mason Massey	Alpha Prime Racing	Chevrolet
48	Nick Sanchez (R)	Big Machine Racing	Chevrolet
51	Jeremy Clements	Jeremy Clements Racing	Chevrolet
53	Mason Maggio	Joey Gase Motorsports	Ford
54	Taylor Gray (R)	Joe Gibbs Racing	Toyota
70	Leland Honeyman	Cope Family Racing	Chevrolet
71	Ryan Ellis	DGM Racing	Chevrolet
74	Carson Ware	Mike Harmon Racing	Chevrolet
88	Connor Zilisch (R)	JR Motorsports	Chevrolet
91	Josh Bilicki	DGM Racing	Chevrolet
92	C. J. McLaughlin	DGM Racing	Chevrolet
99	Matt DiBenedetto	Viking Motorsports	Chevrolet
Official entry list

== Qualifying ==
Qualifying was held on Friday, February 21, at 5:05 PM EST. Since Atlanta Motor Speedway is an intermediate track with superspeedway rules, the qualifying procedure used is a single-car, single-lap system with two rounds. In the first round, drivers have one lap to set a time and determine positions 11-38. The fastest ten drivers from the first round will advance to the second round, and whoever sets the fastest time in Round 2 will win the pole and determine the rest of the starting lineup.

Jesse Love, driving for Richard Childress Racing, would win the pole after advancing from the preliminary round and setting the fastest time in Round 2, with a lap of 31.730, and a speed of 174.724 mph (281.191 km/h).

No drivers would fail to qualify.

=== Qualifying results ===
Pos.	#	Driver	Team	Make	Time (R1)	Speed (R1)	Time (R2)	Speed (R2)
1	2	Jesse Love	Richard Childress Racing	Chevrolet	31.818	174.241	31.730	174.724
2	21	Austin Hill	Richard Childress Racing	Chevrolet	31.884	173.880	31.793	174.378
3	11	Josh Williams	Kaulig Racing	Chevrolet	32.017	173.158	31.920	173.684
4	7	Justin Allgaier	JR Motorsports	Chevrolet	32.003	173.234	31.926	173.652
5	41	Sam Mayer	Haas Factory Team	Ford	32.028	173.099	31.932	173.619
6	54	Taylor Gray (R)	Joe Gibbs Racing	Toyota	32.045	173.007	31.955	173.494
7	20	Brandon Jones	Joe Gibbs Racing	Toyota	32.027	173.104	31.960	173.467
8	1	Carson Kvapil (R)	JR Motorsports	Chevrolet	31.993	173.288	31.963	173.451
9	16	Christian Eckes (R)	Kaulig Racing	Chevrolet	31.964	173.445	32.011	173.190
10	88	Connor Zilisch (R)	JR Motorsports	Chevrolet	32.031	173.082	32.028	173.099
Eliminated in Round 1
11	18	William Sawalich (R)	Joe Gibbs Racing	Toyota	32.069	172.877	—	—
12	8	Sammy Smith	JR Motorsports	Chevrolet	32.075	172.845	—	—
13	10	Daniel Dye (R)	Kaulig Racing	Chevrolet	32.081	172.813	—	—
14	39	Ryan Sieg	RSS Racing	Ford	32.088	172.775	—	—
15	48	Nick Sanchez (R)	Big Machine Racing	Chevrolet	32.141	172.490	—	—
16	19	Aric Almirola	Joe Gibbs Racing	Toyota	32.160	172.388	—	—
17	00	Sheldon Creed	Haas Factory Team	Ford	32.187	172.243	—	—
18	42	Anthony Alfredo	Young's Motorsports	Chevrolet	32.257	171.870	—	—
19	25	Harrison Burton	AM Racing	Ford	32.274	171.779	—	—
20	27	Jeb Burton	Jordan Anderson Racing	Chevrolet	32.289	171.699	—	—
21	92	C. J. McLaughlin	DGM Racing	Chevrolet	32.325	171.508	—	—
22	26	Dean Thompson (R)	Sam Hunt Racing	Toyota	32.405	171.085	—	—
23	4	Parker Retzlaff	Alpha Prime Racing	Chevrolet	32.414	171.037	—	—
24	51	Jeremy Clements	Jeremy Clements Racing	Chevrolet	32.513	170.516	—	—
25	31	Blaine Perkins	Jordan Anderson Racing	Chevrolet	32.558	170.281	—	—
26	71	Ryan Ellis	DGM Racing	Chevrolet	32.559	170.275	—	—
27	28	Kyle Sieg	RSS Racing	Ford	32.582	170.155	—	—
28	5	Kris Wright	Our Motorsports	Chevrolet	32.619	169.962	—	—
29	70	Leland Honeyman	Cope Family Racing	Chevrolet	32.636	169.874	—	—
30	99	Matt DiBenedetto	Viking Motorsports	Chevrolet	32.734	169.365	—	—
31	44	Brennan Poole	Alpha Prime Racing	Chevrolet	32.758	169.241	—	—
32	91	Josh Bilicki	DGM Racing	Chevrolet	32.840	168.819	—	—
Qualified by owner's points
33	14	Garrett Smithley	SS-Green Light Racing	Chevrolet	32.893	168.546	—	—
34	07	Nick Leitz	SS-Green Light Racing	Chevrolet	32.898	168.521	—	—
35	74	Carson Ware	Mike Harmon Racing	Chevrolet	32.916	168.429	—	—
36	45	Mason Massey	Alpha Prime Racing	Chevrolet	33.028	167.858	—	—
37	53	Mason Maggio	Joey Gase Motorsports	Ford	33.139	167.295	—	—
38	35	Joey Gase	Joey Gase Motorsports	Chevrolet	33.217	166.902	—	—
Official qualifying results
Official starting lineup

== Race results ==
Stage 1 Laps: 40

Pos.	#	Driver	Team	Make	Pts
1	21	Austin Hill	Richard Childress Racing	Chevrolet	10
2	2	Jesse Love	Richard Childress Racing	Chevrolet	9
3	41	Sam Mayer	Haas Factory Team	Ford	8
4	54	Taylor Gray (R)	Joe Gibbs Racing	Toyota	7
5	1	Carson Kvapil (R)	JR Motorsports	Chevrolet	6
6	88	Connor Zilisch (R)	JR Motorsports	Chevrolet	5
7	7	Justin Allgaier	JR Motorsports	Chevrolet	4
8	16	Christian Eckes (R)	Kaulig Racing	Chevrolet	3
9	25	Harrison Burton	AM Racing	Ford	2
10	00	Sheldon Creed	Haas Factory Team	Ford	1

Stage 2 Laps: 40

Pos.	#	Driver	Team	Make	Pts
1	21	Austin Hill	Richard Childress Racing	Chevrolet	10
2	41	Sam Mayer	Haas Factory Team	Ford	9
3	00	Sheldon Creed	Haas Factory Team	Ford	8
4	7	Justin Allgaier	JR Motorsports	Chevrolet	7
5	2	Jesse Love	Richard Childress Racing	Chevrolet	6
6	19	Aric Almirola	Joe Gibbs Racing	Toyota	5
7	8	Sammy Smith	JR Motorsports	Chevrolet	4
8	88	Connor Zilisch (R)	JR Motorsports	Chevrolet	3
9	27	Jeb Burton	Jordan Anderson Racing	Chevrolet	2
10	16	Christian Eckes (R)	Kaulig Racing	Chevrolet	1

Stage 3 Laps: 83

Fin	St	#	Driver	Team	Make	Laps	Led	Status	Pts
1	2	21	Austin Hill	Richard Childress Racing	Chevrolet	163	146	Running	60
2	4	7	Justin Allgaier	JR Motorsports	Chevrolet	163	0	Running	46
3	16	19	Aric Almirola	Joe Gibbs Racing	Toyota	163	1	Running	39
4	12	8	Sammy Smith	JR Motorsports	Chevrolet	163	0	Running	37
5	15	48	Nick Sanchez (R)	Big Machine Racing	Chevrolet	163	0	Running	32
6	20	27	Jeb Burton	Jordan Anderson Racing	Chevrolet	163	0	Running	33
7	13	10	Daniel Dye (R)	Kaulig Racing	Chevrolet	163	0	Running	30
8	29	70	Leland Honeyman	Cope Family Racing	Chevrolet	163	1	Running	29
9	11	18	William Sawalich (R)	Joe Gibbs Racing	Toyota	163	0	Running	28
10	19	25	Harrison Burton	AM Racing	Ford	163	0	Running	29
11	24	51	Jeremy Clements	Jeremy Clements Racing	Chevrolet	163	0	Running	26
12	30	99	Matt DiBenedetto	Viking Motorsports	Chevrolet	163	0	Running	25
13	7	20	Brandon Jones	Joe Gibbs Racing	Toyota	163	0	Running	24
14	17	00	Sheldon Creed	Haas Factory Team	Ford	163	0	Running	32
15	3	11	Josh Williams	Kaulig Racing	Chevrolet	163	0	Running	22
16	1	2	Jesse Love	Richard Childress Racing	Chevrolet	163	13	Running	36
17	31	44	Brennan Poole	Alpha Prime Racing	Chevrolet	163	0	Running	20
18	26	71	Ryan Ellis	DGM Racing	Chevrolet	163	0	Running	19
19	25	31	Blaine Perkins	Jordan Anderson Racing	Chevrolet	163	0	Running	18
20	14	39	Ryan Sieg	RSS Racing	Ford	163	0	Running	17
21	38	35	Joey Gase	Joey Gase Motorsports	Chevrolet	163	0	Running	16
22	34	07	Nick Leitz	SS-Green Light Racing	Chevrolet	163	1	Running	15
23	8	1	Carson Kvapil (R)	JR Motorsports	Chevrolet	163	0	Running	20
24	33	14	Garrett Smithley	SS-Green Light Racing	Chevrolet	163	0	Running	13
25	21	92	C. J. McLaughlin	DGM Racing	Chevrolet	163	0	Running	12
26	28	5	Kris Wright	Our Motorsports	Chevrolet	163	0	Running	11
27	23	4	Parker Retzlaff	Alpha Prime Racing	Chevrolet	163	0	Running	10
28	36	45	Mason Massey	Alpha Prime Racing	Chevrolet	163	0	Running	9
29	9	16	Christian Eckes (R)	Kaulig Racing	Chevrolet	162	0	Accident	13
30	32	91	Josh Bilicki	DGM Racing	Chevrolet	162	0	Running	7
31	37	53	Mason Maggio	Joey Gase Motorsports	Ford	162	0	Running	6
32	35	74	Carson Ware	Mike Harmon Racing	Chevrolet	161	0	Running	5
33	27	28	Kyle Sieg	RSS Racing	Ford	154	0	Running	4
34	10	88	Connor Zilisch (R)	JR Motorsports	Chevrolet	151	0	Accident	11
35	22	26	Dean Thompson (R)	Sam Hunt Racing	Toyota	149	0	Running	2
36	5	41	Sam Mayer	Haas Factory Team	Ford	141	1	Accident	18
37	18	42	Anthony Alfredo	Young's Motorsports	Chevrolet	141	0	Accident	1
38	6	54	Taylor Gray (R)	Joe Gibbs Racing	Toyota	118	0	Accident	8
Official race results

== Standings after the race ==
Drivers' Championship standings

	Pos	Driver	Points
16	1	Austin Hill	84
1	2	Sheldon Creed	83 (–1)
1	3	Jesse Love	78 (–6)
6	4	Justin Allgaier	76 (–8)
2	5	Jeb Burton	66 (–18)
2	6	Harrison Burton	61 (–23)
4	7	Jeremy Clements	55 (–29)
3	8	Sam Mayer	53 (–31)
3	9	Carson Kvapil	53 (–31)
4	10	Matt DiBenedetto	51 (–33)
14	11	Sammy Smith	50 (–34)
9	12	Leland Honeyman	50 (–34)
Official driver's standings

Manufacturers' Championship standings

	Pos	Manufacturer	Points
	1	Chevrolet	80
1	2	Toyota	65 (–15)
1	3	Ford	61 (–19)

- Note: Only the first 12 positions are included for the driver standings.

Previous race: 2025 United Rentals 300	NASCAR Xfinity Series; 2025 season	Next race: 2025 Focused Health 250 (COTA)
