= 2025 United Rentals 300 =

1st race of the 2025 NASCAR Xfinity Series

Race details
- Race 1 of 33 of the 2025 NASCAR Xfinity Series
- Date: February 15, 2025
- Official name: 44th Annual United Rentals 300
- Location: Daytona International Speedway in Daytona Beach, Florida
- Course: Permanent racing facility
- Course length: 2.5 miles (4.0 km)
- Distance: 126 laps, 315 mi (507 km)
- Scheduled distance: 120 laps, 300 mi (480 km)
- Average speed: 123.301 mph (198.434 km/h)

Pole position
Driver	Justin Allgaier	JR Motorsports
- Grid positions set by competition-based formula

Most laps led
Driver	Austin Hill	Richard Childress Racing
- Laps: 56

Winner
No. 2	Jesse Love	Richard Childress Racing

Television in the United States
- Network: The CW
- Announcers: Adam Alexander, Jamie McMurray, and Parker Kligerman

Radio in the United States
- Radio: MRN

The 2025 United Rentals 300 was the 1st stock car race of the 2025 NASCAR Xfinity Series, and the 44th iteration of the event. The race was held on Saturday, February 15, 2025, at Daytona International Speedway in Daytona Beach, Florida, a 2.5 miles (4.0 km) superspeedway. The race was originally scheduled to be contested over 120 laps but was increased to 126 laps due to an overtime finish.

Jesse Love, driving for Richard Childress Racing, would dominate the final stages of the race, leading 30 laps to earn his second career NASCAR Xfinity Series win, and his first of the season. Love's teammate, Austin Hill, continued to show a dominating performance at Daytona, winning both stages and leading a race-high 56 laps, before experiencing issues in the late stages and finishing 33rd, ending his winning streak. To fill out the podium, Sam Mayer and Sheldon Creed, both driving for Haas Factory Team, would finish 2nd and 3rd, respectively.

== Report ==
=== Background ===
Daytona International Speedway, the track where the race will be held.

Daytona International Speedway is one of three superspeedways to hold NASCAR races, the other two being Atlanta Motor Speedway and Talladega Superspeedway. The standard track at Daytona International Speedway is a four-turn superspeedway that is 2.5 miles (4.0 km) long. The track's turns are banked at 31 degrees, while the front stretch, the location of the finish line, is banked at 18 degrees.

==== Entry list ====
- (R) denotes rookie driver.
- (i) denotes driver who is ineligible for series driver points.

#	Driver	Team	Make
00	Sheldon Creed	Haas Factory Team	Ford
1	Carson Kvapil (R)	JR Motorsports	Chevrolet
2	Jesse Love	Richard Childress Racing	Chevrolet
4	Parker Retzlaff	Alpha Prime Racing	Chevrolet
5	Kris Wright	Our Motorsports	Chevrolet
07	Patrick Emerling	SS-Green Light Racing	Chevrolet
7	Justin Allgaier	JR Motorsports	Chevrolet
8	Sammy Smith	JR Motorsports	Chevrolet
10	Daniel Dye (R)	Kaulig Racing	Chevrolet
11	Josh Williams	Kaulig Racing	Chevrolet
14	Garrett Smithley	SS-Green Light Racing	Chevrolet
16	Christian Eckes (R)	Kaulig Racing	Chevrolet
18	William Sawalich (R)	Joe Gibbs Racing	Toyota
19	Justin Bonsignore	Joe Gibbs Racing	Toyota
20	Brandon Jones	Joe Gibbs Racing	Toyota
21	Austin Hill	Richard Childress Racing	Chevrolet
24	Ryan Truex	Sam Hunt Racing	Toyota
25	Harrison Burton	AM Racing	Ford
26	Dean Thompson (R)	Sam Hunt Racing	Toyota
27	Jeb Burton	Jordan Anderson Racing	Chevrolet
28	Kyle Sieg	RSS Racing	Ford
29	J. J. Yeley (i)	RSS Racing	Ford
31	Blaine Perkins	Jordan Anderson Racing	Chevrolet
32	Jordan Anderson	Jordan Anderson Racing	Chevrolet
35	Greg Van Alst	Joey Gase Motorsports	Chevrolet
39	Ryan Sieg	RSS Racing	Ford
41	Sam Mayer	Haas Factory Team	Ford
42	Anthony Alfredo	Young's Motorsports	Chevrolet
44	Brennan Poole	Alpha Prime Racing	Chevrolet
45	Caesar Bacarella	Alpha Prime Racing	Chevrolet
48	Nick Sanchez (R)	Big Machine Racing	Chevrolet
51	Jeremy Clements	Jeremy Clements Racing	Chevrolet
53	Joey Gase	Joey Gase Motorsports	Chevrolet
54	Taylor Gray (R)	Joe Gibbs Racing	Toyota
70	Leland Honeyman	Cope Family Racing	Chevrolet
71	Ryan Ellis	DGM Racing	Chevrolet
74	Carson Ware	Mike Harmon Racing	Chevrolet
88	Connor Zilisch (R)	JR Motorsports	Chevrolet
91	Josh Bilicki	DGM Racing	Chevrolet
92	C. J. McLaughlin	DGM Racing	Chevrolet
99	Matt DiBenedetto	Viking Motorsports	Chevrolet
Official entry list

== Practice ==
The first and only practice session was held on Friday, February 14, at 4:35 PM EST, and would last for 50 minutes. Taylor Gray, driving for Joe Gibbs Racing, would set the fastest time in the session, with a lap of 48.386, and a speed of 186.004 mph (299.344 km/h).

Pos.	#	Driver	Team	Make	Time	Speed
1	54	Taylor Gray (R)	Joe Gibbs Racing	Toyota	48.386	186.004
2	18	William Sawalich (R)	Joe Gibbs Racing	Toyota	48.388	185.997
3	8	Sammy Smith	JR Motorsports	Chevrolet	48.398	185.958
Official practice results

== Qualifying ==
Qualifying was originally scheduled to be held on Saturday, February 15, at 10:00 AM EST, but was cancelled due to inclement weather. Since Daytona International Speedway is a superspeedway, the qualifying procedure used is a single-car, single-lap system with two rounds. In the first round, drivers have one lap to set a time and determine positions 11-38. The fastest ten drivers from the first round will advance to the second round, and whoever sets the fastest time in Round 2 will win the pole and determine the rest of the starting lineup.

Because of a delayed start, and time constraints with the ARCA Menards Series race, only one round of qualifying was scheduled to be contested. After rain started to hit the track with 12 cars that took a qualifying lap, the rest of the session was cancelled, and the starting lineup was determined by last season's owners' points. As a result, Justin Allgaier, driving for JR Motorsports, will start on the pole.

Three drivers failed to qualify: Carson Ware, C. J. McLaughlin, and J. J. Yeley.

=== Qualifying results ===
Pos.	#	Driver	Team	Make
1	7	Justin Allgaier	JR Motorsports	Chevrolet
2	54	Taylor Gray (R)	Joe Gibbs Racing	Toyota
3	16	Christian Eckes (R)	Kaulig Racing	Chevrolet
4	21	Austin Hill	Richard Childress Racing	Chevrolet
5	18	William Sawalich (R)	Joe Gibbs Racing	Toyota
6	00	Sheldon Creed	Haas Factory Team	Ford
7	20	Brandon Jones	Joe Gibbs Racing	Toyota
8	41	Sam Mayer	Haas Factory Team	Ford
9	2	Jesse Love	Richard Childress Racing	Chevrolet
10	1	Carson Kvapil (R)	JR Motorsports	Chevrolet
11	48	Nick Sanchez (R)	Big Machine Racing	Chevrolet
12	10	Daniel Dye (R)	Kaulig Racing	Chevrolet
13	8	Sammy Smith	JR Motorsports	Chevrolet
14	39	Ryan Sieg	RSS Racing	Ford
15	19	Justin Bonsignore	Joe Gibbs Racing	Toyota
16	35	Greg Van Alst	Joey Gase Motorsports	Chevrolet
17	5	Kris Wright	Our Motorsports	Chevrolet
18	44	Brennan Poole	Alpha Prime Racing	Chevrolet
19	26	Dean Thompson (R)	Sam Hunt Racing	Toyota
20	88	Connor Zilisch (R)	JR Motorsports	Chevrolet
21	11	Josh Williams	Kaulig Racing	Chevrolet
22	27	Jeb Burton	Jordan Anderson Racing	Chevrolet
23	28	Kyle Sieg	RSS Racing	Ford
24	71	Ryan Ellis	DGM Racing	Chevrolet
25	51	Jeremy Clements	Jeremy Clements Racing	Chevrolet
26	31	Blaine Perkins	Jordan Anderson Racing	Chevrolet
27	42	Anthony Alfredo	Young's Motorsports	Chevrolet
28	4	Parker Retzlaff	Alpha Prime Racing	Chevrolet
29	91	Josh Bilicki	DGM Racing	Chevrolet
30	99	Matt DiBenedetto	Viking Motorsports	Chevrolet
31	14	Garrett Smithley	SS-Green Light Racing	Chevrolet
32	25	Harrison Burton	AM Racing	Ford
33	24	Ryan Truex	Sam Hunt Racing	Toyota
Qualified by owner's points
34	70	Leland Honeyman	Cope Family Racing	Chevrolet
35	07	Patrick Emerling	SS-Green Light Racing	Chevrolet
36	45	Caesar Bacarella	Alpha Prime Racing	Chevrolet
37	53	Joey Gase	Joey Gase Motorsports	Chevrolet
38	32	Jordan Anderson	Jordan Anderson Racing	Chevrolet
Failed to qualify
39	74	Carson Ware	Mike Harmon Racing	Chevrolet
40	92	C. J. McLaughlin	DGM Racing	Chevrolet
41	29	J. J. Yeley (i)	RSS Racing	Ford
Official starting lineup

== Race results ==
Stage 1 Laps: 30

Pos.	#	Driver	Team	Make	Pts
1	21	Austin Hill	Richard Childress Racing	Chevrolet	10
2	00	Sheldon Creed	Haas Factory Team	Ford	9
3	48	Nick Sanchez (R)	Big Machine Racing	Chevrolet	8
4	27	Jeb Burton	Jordan Anderson Racing	Chevrolet	7
5	42	Anthony Alfredo	Young's Motorsports	Chevrolet	6
6	70	Leland Honeyman	Cope Family Racing	Chevrolet	5
7	7	Justin Allgaier	JR Motorsports	Chevrolet	4
8	26	Dean Thompson (R)	Sam Hunt Racing	Toyota	3
9	2	Jesse Love	Richard Childress Racing	Chevrolet	2
10	54	Taylor Gray (R)	Joe Gibbs Racing	Toyota	1

Stage 2 Laps: 30

Pos.	#	Driver	Team	Make	Pts
1	21	Austin Hill	Richard Childress Racing	Chevrolet	10
2	39	Ryan Sieg	RSS Racing	Ford	9
3	00	Sheldon Creed	Haas Factory Team	Ford	8
4	7	Justin Allgaier	JR Motorsports	Chevrolet	7
5	26	Dean Thompson (R)	Sam Hunt Racing	Toyota	6
6	27	Jeb Burton	Jordan Anderson Racing	Chevrolet	5
7	54	Taylor Gray (R)	Joe Gibbs Racing	Toyota	4
8	18	William Sawalich (R)	Joe Gibbs Racing	Toyota	3
9	42	Anthony Alfredo	Young's Motorsports	Chevrolet	2
10	25	Harrison Burton	AM Racing	Ford	1

Stage 3 Laps: 60

Fin	St	#	Driver	Team	Make	Laps	Led	Status	Pts
1	9	2	Jesse Love	Richard Childress Racing	Chevrolet	126	30	Running	42
2	8	41	Sam Mayer	Haas Factory Team	Ford	126	0	Running	35
3	6	00	Sheldon Creed	Haas Factory Team	Ford	126	7	Running	51
4	10	1	Carson Kvapil (R)	JR Motorsports	Chevrolet	126	0	Running	33
5	2	54	Taylor Gray (R)	Joe Gibbs Racing	Toyota	126	1	Running	37
6	32	25	Harrison Burton	AM Racing	Ford	126	1	Running	32
7	38	32	Jordan Anderson	Jordan Anderson Racing	Chevrolet	126	0	Running	30
8	19	26	Dean Thompson (R)	Sam Hunt Racing	Toyota	126	0	Running	38
9	25	51	Jeremy Clements	Jeremy Clements Racing	Chevrolet	126	0	Running	29
10	35	07	Patrick Emerling	SS-Green Light Racing	Chevrolet	126	0	Running	27
11	30	99	Matt DiBenedetto	Viking Motorsports	Chevrolet	126	0	Running	26
12	3	16	Christian Eckes (R)	Kaulig Racing	Chevrolet	126	0	Running	25
13	36	45	Caesar Bacarella	Alpha Prime Racing	Chevrolet	126	4	Running	24
14	29	91	Josh Bilicki	DGM Racing	Chevrolet	126	0	Running	23
15	37	53	Joey Gase	Joey Gase Motorsports	Chevrolet	126	0	Running	22
16	22	27	Jeb Burton	Jordan Anderson Racing	Chevrolet	126	4	Running	33
17	33	24	Ryan Truex	Sam Hunt Racing	Toyota	126	0	Running	20
18	1	7	Justin Allgaier	JR Motorsports	Chevrolet	126	11	Running	30
19	14	39	Ryan Sieg	RSS Racing	Ford	125	10	Accident	27
20	21	11	Josh Williams	Kaulig Racing	Chevrolet	125	0	Accident	17
21	34	70	Leland Honeyman	Cope Family Racing	Chevrolet	125	0	Accident	21
22	27	42	Anthony Alfredo	Young's Motorsports	Chevrolet	125	0	Accident	23
23	24	71	Ryan Ellis	DGM Racing	Chevrolet	125	0	Running	14
24	13	8	Sammy Smith	JR Motorsports	Chevrolet	125	1	Running	13
25	15	19	Justin Bonsignore	Joe Gibbs Racing	Toyota	123	0	Running	12
26	16	35	Greg Van Alst	Joey Gase Motorsports	Chevrolet	120	0	Accident	11
27	20	88	Connor Zilisch (R)	JR Motorsports	Chevrolet	118	1	Accident	10
28	5	18	William Sawalich (R)	Joe Gibbs Racing	Toyota	118	0	Accident	12
29	28	4	Parker Retzlaff	Alpha Prime Racing	Chevrolet	118	0	Accident	8
30	18	44	Brennan Poole	Alpha Prime Racing	Chevrolet	105	0	Running	7
31	31	14	Garrett Smithley	SS-Green Light Racing	Chevrolet	95	0	Electrical	6
32	17	5	Kris Wright	Our Motorsports	Chevrolet	86	0	Accident	5
33	4	21	Austin Hill	Richard Childress Racing	Chevrolet	82	56	Rear End	24
34	26	31	Blaine Perkins	Jordan Anderson Racing	Chevrolet	79	0	Power Steer	3
35	11	48	Nick Sanchez (R)	Big Machine Racing	Chevrolet	59	0	Accident	10
36	23	28	Kyle Sieg	RSS Racing	Ford	22	0	Rear End	1
37	7	20	Brandon Jones	Joe Gibbs Racing	Toyota	5	0	Accident	1
38	12	10	Daniel Dye (R)	Kaulig Racing	Chevrolet	5	0	Accident	1
Official race results

== Standings after the race ==
Drivers' Championship standings

Pos	Driver	Points
1	Sheldon Creed	51
2	Jesse Love	42 (–9)
3	Dean Thompson	38 (–13)
4	Taylor Gray	37 (–14)
5	Sam Mayer	35 (–16)
6	Carson Kvapil	33 (–18)
7	Jeb Burton	33 (–18)
8	Harrison Burton	32 (–19)
9	Jordan Anderson	30 (–21)
10	Justin Allgaier	30 (–21)
11	Jeremy Clements	29 (–22)
12	Patrick Emerling	27 (–24)
Official driver's standings

Manufacturers' Championship standings

Pos	Manufacturer	Points
1	Chevrolet	40
2	Ford	34 (–6)
3	Toyota	30 (–10)

- Note: Only the first 12 positions are included for the driver standings.

Previous race: 2024 NASCAR Xfinity Series Championship Race	NASCAR Xfinity Series; 2025 season	Next race: 2025 Bennett Transportation & Logistics 250
