= 2020 Pocono Green 225 =

NASCAR Xfinity Series race

Race details
- Race 12 of 33 in the 2020 NASCAR Xfinity Series season
- Date: June 28, 2020
- Location: Pocono Raceway in Long Pond, Pennsylvania
- Course: Permanent racing facility
- Course length: 2.5 miles (4.023 km)
- Distance: 91 laps, 227.5 mi (366.126 km)
- Scheduled distance: 90 laps, 225 mi (362.102 km)

Pole position
Driver	Noah Gragson	JR Motorsports
- Grid positions set by ballot

Most laps led
Driver	Ross Chastain	Kaulig Racing
- Laps: 31

Winner
No. 98	Chase Briscoe	Stewart-Haas Racing

Television in the United States
- Network: FS1
- Announcers: Adam Alexander, Jamie McMurray, Regan Smith
- Nielsen ratings: 1.173 million

Radio in the United States
- Radio: MRN

The 2020 Pocono Green 225, branded as the Pocono Green 225 Recycled by J.P. Mascaro & Sons, was a NASCAR Xfinity Series race held on June 28, 2020 at Pocono Raceway in Long Pond, Pennsylvania. Contested over 91 laps—extended from 90 laps due to an overtime finish—on the 2.5-mile (4.0 km) triangular racecourse, it was the 12th race of the 2020 NASCAR Xfinity Series season and the season's fourth and final Dash 4 Cash race. Chase Briscoe won his fourth race of the season.

== Report ==
=== Background ===
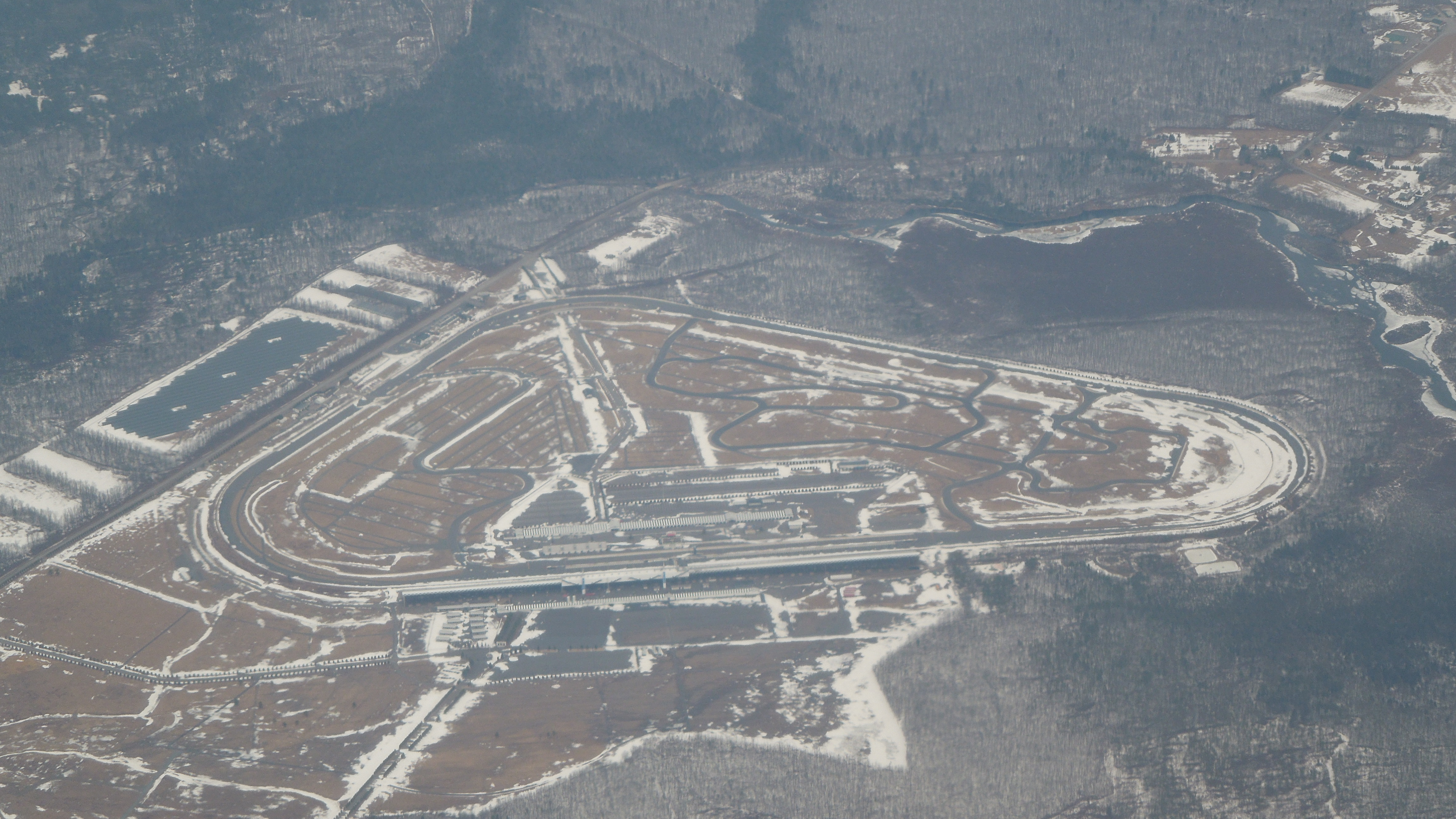
Pocono Raceway, the track where the race was held.

The race was held at Pocono Raceway, which is a three-turn superspeedway located in Long Pond, Pennsylvania. The track hosts two Cup Series races: the Pocono Organics 325 and the Pocono 350, as well as one Xfinity Series and Gander RV & Outdoors Truck Series event. Since 2013, the track is also host to a NTT IndyCar Series race.

Pocono Raceway is one of a very few NASCAR tracks not owned by either Speedway Motorsports, Inc. or International Speedway Corporation. It is operated by the Igdalsky siblings Brandon, Nicholas, and sister Ashley, and cousins Joseph IV and Chase Mattioli, all of whom are third-generation members of the family-owned Mattco Inc, started by Joseph II and Rose Mattioli.

The race was held without fans in attendance due to the ongoing COVID-19 pandemic.

This race marked Jeff Green's final NASCAR start to date.

=== Dash 4 Cash ===
The Dash 4 Cash is a series of four races in the NASCAR Xfinity Series, preceded by a qualifying race. The top four points-eligible drivers in the previous race are eligible to win a $100,000 bonus on top of their race winnings if they win the race. Cup Series regulars are not permitted to compete in the races.

The Pocono Green 225 was the season's fourth and final Dash 4 Cash race. Ross Chastain, Austin Cindric, Justin Haley, and Alex Labbé were eligible to win after being the top 4 points-eligible drivers at the Unhinged 300 that were driving in this race.^{†}

† - Jeb Burton, Brett Moffitt, Anthony Alfredo, and Gray Gaulding all finished ahead of Alex Labbé at Talladega, but were either not eligible for Xfinity Series points or not entered into this race.

=== Entry list ===
- (R) denotes rookie driver.
- (i) denotes driver who is ineligible for series driver points.

No.	Driver	Team	Manufacturer	Sponsor
0	Jeffrey Earnhardt	JD Motorsports	Chevrolet	EcoVirux
1	Michael Annett	JR Motorsports	Chevrolet	Pilot/Flying J
02	Brett Moffitt (i)	Our Motorsports	Chevrolet	Cape Cod Aggregaets
4	Jesse Little (R)	JD Motorsports	Chevrolet	
5	Matt Mills	B. J. McLeod Motorsports	Chevrolet	J.F. Electric
6	B. J. McLeod	JD Motorsports	Chevrolet	
7	Justin Allgaier	JR Motorsports	Chevrolet	Hellmann’s Roasted Garlic Sauce
07	Carson Ware	SS-Green Light Racing	Chevrolet	Jacob Companies
8	Daniel Hemric	JR Motorsports	Chevrolet	OnDeck
08	Joe Graf Jr. (R)	SS-Green Light Racing	Chevrolet	Bucked Up Energy
9	Noah Gragson	JR Motorsports	Chevrolet	Bass Pro Shops/Black Rifle Coffee
10	Ross Chastain	Kaulig Racing	Chevrolet	Nutrien Ag Solutions
11	Justin Haley	Kaulig Racing	Chevrolet	LeafFilter Gutter Protection
13	Chad Finchum	MBM Motorsports	Toyota	Smithbilt Homes
15	Ryan Vargas	JD Motorsports	Chevrolet	Cranio Care Bears/FACES
18	Riley Herbst (R)	Joe Gibbs Racing	Toyota	Monster Energy
19	Brandon Jones	Joe Gibbs Racing	Toyota	Toyota Service Centers
20	Harrison Burton (R)	Joe Gibbs Racing	Toyota	DEX Imaging
21	Myatt Snider (R)	Richard Childress Racing	Chevrolet	TaxSlayer
22	Austin Cindric	Team Penske	Ford	MoneyLion
36	Dexter Bean	DGM Racing	Chevrolet	
39	Ryan Sieg	RSS Racing	Chevrolet	CMRRoofing.com
44	Tommy Joe Martins	Martins Motorsports	Chevrolet	AAN Adjusters
47	Kyle Weatherman	Mike Harmon Racing	Chevrolet	#BackTheBlue
51	Jeremy Clements	Jeremy Clements Racing	Chevrolet	Fly & Form Structures
52	Kody Vanderwal (R)	Means Racing	Chevrolet	ADVANCED DAIRY SERVICE
61	Timmy Hill (i)	Hattori Racing	Toyota	RoofClaim.com
66	Stephen Leicht	MBM Motorsports	Toyota	JaniKing
68	Brandon Brown	Brandonbilt Motorsports	Chevrolet	Brandonbilt Motorsports
74	Bayley Currey (i)	Mike Harmon Racing	Chevrolet	Mutt & Jeff Porkskins
78	Vinnie Miller	B. J. McLeod Motorsports	Chevrolet	Koolbox ICE
90	Alex Labbé	DGM Racing	Chevrolet	LaRue Snowblowers/aluminium
92	Josh Williams	DGM Racing	Chevrolet	Musselman’s Apple Sauce
93	Jeff Green	RSS Racing	Chevrolet	
98	Chase Briscoe	Stewart-Haas Racing	Ford	HighPoint.com
99	Stefan Parsons	B. J. McLeod Motorsports	Toyota	RacingJobs.com
Official entry list

== Qualifying ==
Noah Gragson was awarded the pole for the race as determined by a random draw.

=== Starting Lineup ===
Pos	No	Driver	Team	Manufacturer
1	9	Noah Gragson	JR Motorsports	Chevrolet
2	21	Myatt Snider (R)	Richard Childress Racing	Chevrolet
3	98	Chase Briscoe	Stewart-Haas Racing	Ford
4	7	Justin Allgaier	JR Motorsports	Chevrolet
5	10	Ross Chastain	Kaulig Racing	Chevrolet
6	11	Justin Haley	Kaulig Racing	Chevrolet
7	19	Brandon Jones	Joe Gibbs Racing	Toyota
8	8	Daniel Hemric	JR Motorsports	Chevrolet
9	22	Austin Cindric	Team Penske	Ford
10	20	Harrison Burton (R)	Joe Gibbs Racing	Toyota
11	39	Ryan Sieg	RSS Racing	Chevrolet
12	1	Michael Annett	JR Motorsports	Chevrolet
13	92	Josh Williams	DGM Racing	Chevrolet
14	4	Jesse Little (R)	JD Motorsports	Chevrolet
15	0	Jeffrey Earnhardt	JD Motorsports	Chevrolet
16	07	Carson Ware	SS-Green Light Racing	Chevrolet
17	15	Ryan Vargas	JD Motorsports	Chevrolet
18	02	Brett Moffitt (i)	Our Motorsports	Chevrolet
19	90	Alex Labbé	DGM Racing	Chevrolet
20	36	Dexter Bean	DGM Racing	Chevrolet
21	51	Jeremy Clements	Jeremy Clements Racing	Chevrolet
22	68	Brandon Brown	Brandonbilt Motorsports	Chevrolet
23	6	B. J. McLeod	JD Motorsports	Chevrolet
24	18	Riley Herbst (R)	Joe Gibbs Racing	Toyota
25	08	Joe Graf Jr. (R)	SS-Green Light Racing	Chevrolet
26	99	Stefan Parsons	B. J. McLeod Motorsports	Toyota
27	13	Chad Finchum	MBM Motorsports	Toyota
28	52	Kody Vanderwal (R)	Means Racing	Chevrolet
29	78	Vinnie Miller	B. J. McLeod Motorsports	Chevrolet
30	93	Jeff Green	RSS Racing	Chevrolet
31	44	Tommy Joe Martins	Martins Motorsports	Chevrolet
32	47	Kyle Weatherman	Mike Harmon Racing	Chevrolet
33	5	Matt Mills	B. J. McLeod Motorsports	Chevrolet
34	61	Timmy Hill (i)	Hattori Racing	Toyota
35	74	Bayley Currey (i)	Mike Harmon Racing	Chevrolet
36	66	Stephen Leicht	MBM Motorsports	Toyota
Official starting lineup

- . – Eligible for Dash 4 Cash prize money.
- The No. 0 and No. 07 had to start from the rear due to unapproved adjustments.

== Race ==
=== Race results ===
==== Stage Results ====
Stage One

Laps: 20

Pos	No	Driver	Team	Manufacturer	Points
1	22	Austin Cindric	Team Penske	Ford	10
2	10	Ross Chastain	Kaulig Racing	Chevrolet	9
3	7	Justin Allgaier	JR Motorsports	Chevrolet	8
4	21	Myatt Snider (R)	Richard Childress Racing	Chevrolet	7
5	1	Michael Annett	JR Motorsports	Chevrolet	6
6	98	Chase Briscoe	Stewart-Haas Racing	Ford	5
7	9	Noah Gragson	JR Motorsports	Chevrolet	4
8	18	Riley Herbst (R)	Joe Gibbs Racing	Toyota	3
9	11	Justin Haley	Kaulig Racing	Chevrolet	2
10	8	Daniel Hemric	JR Motorsports	Chevrolet	1

Stage Two

Laps: 20

Pos	No	Driver	Team	Manufacturer	Points
1	7	Justin Allgaier	JR Motorsports	Chevrolet	10
2	22	Austin Cindric	Team Penske	Ford	9
3	9	Noah Gragson	JR Motorsports	Chevrolet	8
4	8	Daniel Hemric	JR Motorsports	Chevrolet	7
5	18	Riley Herbst (R)	Joe Gibbs Racing	Toyota	6
6	1	Michael Annett	JR Motorsports	Chevrolet	5
7	21	Myatt Snider (R)	Richard Childress Racing	Chevrolet	4
8	39	Ryan Sieg	RSS Racing	Chevrolet	3
9	02	Brett Moffitt (i)	Our Motorsports	Chevrolet	2
10	51	Jeremy Clements	Jeremy Clements Racing	Chevrolet	1

=== Final Stage Results ===
Laps: 50

Pos	Grid	No	Driver	Team	Manufacturer	Laps	Points	Status
1	3	98	Chase Briscoe	Stewart-Haas Racing	Ford	91	45	Running
2	5	10	Ross Chastain	Kaulig Racing	Chevrolet	91	44	Running
3	21	51	Jeremy Clements	Jeremy Clements Racing	Chevrolet	91	35	Running
4	2	21	Myatt Snider (R)	Richard Childress Racing	Chevrolet	91	44	Running
5	12	1	Michael Annett	JR Motorsports	Chevrolet	91	43	Running
6	4	7	Justin Allgaier	JR Motorsports	Chevrolet	91	49	Running
7	18	02	Brett Moffitt (i)	Our Motorsports	Chevrolet	91	0	Running
8	34	61	Timmy Hill (i)	Hattori Racing	Toyota	91	0	Running
9	24	18	Riley Herbst (R)	Joe Gibbs Racing	Toyota	91	37	Running
10	14	4	Jesse Little (R)	JD Motorsports	Chevrolet	91	27	Running
11	20	36	Dexter Bean	DGM Racing	Chevrolet	91	26	Running
12	11	39	Ryan Sieg	RSS Racing	Chevrolet	91	28	Running
13	17	15	Ryan Vargas	JD Motorsports	Chevrolet	91	24	Running
14	23	6	B. J. McLeod	JD Motorsports	Chevrolet	91	23	Running
15	32	47	Kyle Weatherman	Mike Harmon Racing	Chevrolet	91	22	Running
16	15	0	Jeffrey Earnhardt	JD Motorsports	Chevrolet	91	21	Running
17	19	90	Alex Labbé	DGM Racing	Chevrolet	91	20	Running
18	29	78	Vinnie Miller	B. J. McLeod Motorsports	Chevrolet	91	19	Running
19	28	52	Kody Vanderwal (R)	Means Racing	Chevrolet	91	18	Running
20	16	07	Carson Ware	SS-Green Light Racing	Chevrolet	91	17	Running
21	26	99	Stefan Parsons	B. J. McLeod Motorsports	Toyota	91	16	Running
22	1	9	Noah Gragson	JR Motorsports	Chevrolet	90	27	Running
23	6	11	Justin Haley	Kaulig Racing	Chevrolet	89	16	Running
24	35	74	Bayley Currey (i)	Mike Harmon Racing	Chevrolet	78	0	Running
25	33	5	Matt Mills	B. J. McLeod Motorsports	Chevrolet	73	12	Transmission
26	27	13	Chad Finchum	MBM Motorsports	Toyota	73	11	Accident
27	36	66	Stephen Leicht	MBM Motorsports	Toyota	69	10	Electrical
28	8	8	Daniel Hemric	JR Motorsports	Chevrolet	52	17	Accident
29	9	22	Austin Cindric	Team Penske	Ford	52	27	Accident
30	31	44	Tommy Joe Martins	Martins Motorsports	Chevrolet	44	7	Oil Leak
31	30	93	Jeff Green	RSS Racing	Chevrolet	17	6	Power
32	10	20	Harrison Burton (R)	Joe Gibbs Racing	Toyota	14	5	Accident
33	22	68	Brandon Brown	Brandonbilt Motorsports	Chevrolet	7	4	Oil Tank
34	13	92	Josh Williams	DGM Racing	Chevrolet	4	3	Accident
35	25	08	Joe Graf Jr. (R)	SS-Green Light Racing	Chevrolet	4	2	Accident
36	7	19	Brandon Jones	Joe Gibbs Racing	Toyota	0	1	Accident
Official race results

- . – Won the Dash 4 Cash prize money.

=== Race statistics ===
- Lead changes: 12 among 6 different drivers
- Cautions/Laps: 9 for 31
- Red flags: 1
- Time of race: 2 hours, 5 minutes, 44 seconds
- Average speed: 108.563 mph (174.715 km/h)

== Media ==
=== Television ===
The Pocono Green 225 was carried by FS1 in the United States. Adam Alexander, Jamie McMurray, and Regan Smith called the race from the Fox Sports Studio in Charlotte, with Matt Yocum covering pit road.

FS1
Booth announcers	Pit reporter
Lap-by-lap: Adam Alexander Color-commentator: Jamie McMurray Color-commentator: Regan Smith	Matt Yocum

=== Radio ===
The Motor Racing Network (MRN) called the race for radio, which was simulcast on SiriusXM NASCAR Radio.

== Standings after the race ==
Drivers' Championship standings

	Pos	Driver	Points
1	1	Chase Briscoe	499
1	2	Noah Gragson	496 (-3)
1	3	Ross Chastain	466 (-33)
1	4	Austin Cindric	453 (-46)
	5	Harrison Burton (R)	404 (-95)
	6	Justin Haley	401 (-98)
1	7	Justin Allgaier	386 (-113)
1	8	Brandon Jones	376 (-123)
	9	Michael Annett	339 (-160)
	10	Ryan Sieg	301 (-198)
	11	Riley Herbst (R)	294 (-205)
2	12	Myatt Snider (R)	258 (-241)
Official driver's standings

- Note: Only the first 12 positions are included for the driver standings.
- . – Driver has clinched a position in the NASCAR playoffs.

Previous race: 2020 Unhinged 300	NASCAR Xfinity Series; 2020 season	Next race: 2020 Pennzoil 150
