= 2020 Unhinged 300 =

NASCAR Xfinity Series race

Race details
- Race 11 of 33 in the 2020 NASCAR Xfinity Series season
- Date: June 20, 2020
- Location: Talladega Superspeedway in Lincoln, Alabama
- Course: Permanent racing facility
- Course length: 2.66 miles (4.28 km)
- Distance: 113 laps, 300.58 mi (483.74 km)

Pole position
Driver	Justin Haley	Kaulig Racing
- Grid positions set by ballot

Most laps led
Driver	Ross Chastain	Kaulig Racing
- Laps: 24

Winner
No. 11	Justin Haley	Kaulig Racing

Television in the United States
- Network: FS1
- Announcers: Adam Alexander, Aric Almirola, Jamie McMurray
- Nielsen ratings: 998,000

Radio in the United States
- Radio: MRN

The 2020 Unhinged 300 (named as such due to a title sponsorship for the 2020 film of the same name) was a NASCAR Xfinity Series race held on June 20, 2020 at Talladega Superspeedway in Lincoln, Alabama. Contested over 113 laps on the 2.66-mile (4.28 km) superspeedway, it was the 11th race of the 2020 NASCAR Xfinity Series season and the season's third Dash 4 Cash race. Kaulig Racing's Justin Haley picked up his first career Xfinity Series victory.

The race was originally scheduled to be held on April 25, but was rescheduled due to the COVID-19 pandemic.

== Report ==
=== Background ===
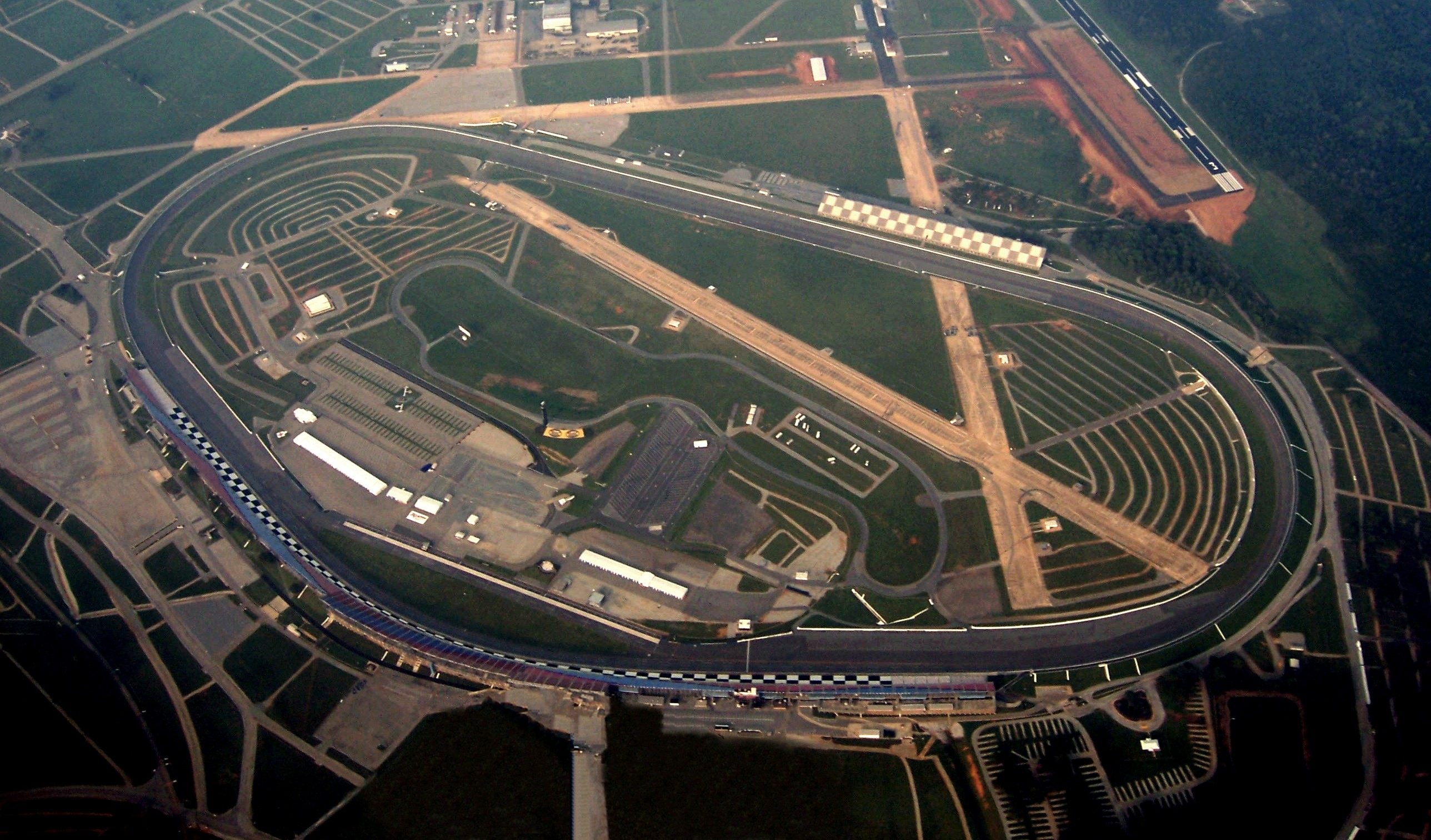
Talladega Superspeedway, the track where the race was held.

Talladega Superspeedway, formerly known as Alabama International Motor Speedway, is a motorsports complex located north of Talladega, Alabama. It is located on the former Anniston Air Force Base in the small city of Lincoln. A tri-oval, the track was constructed in 1969 by the International Speedway Corporation, a business controlled by the France family. Talladega is most known for its steep banking. The track currently hosts NASCAR's Cup Series, Xfinity Series and Gander RV & Outdoors Truck Series. Talladega is the longest NASCAR oval with a length of 2.66-mile-long (4.28 km) tri-oval like the Daytona International Speedway, which is 2.5-mile-long (4.0 km).

Because of the ongoing COVID-19 pandemic, the race was held with limited spectators, with the grandstands and infield closed. Spectators were restricted to the 44 open backstretch motorhome lots who had camping tickets for both days of the meeting.

=== Dash 4 Cash ===
The Dash 4 Cash is a series of four races in the NASCAR Xfinity Series, preceded by a qualifying race. The top four points-eligible drivers in the previous race are eligible to win a $100,000 bonus on top of their race winnings if they win the race. Cup Series regulars are not permitted to compete in the races.

The Unhinged 300 was the season's third Dash 4 Cash race. A. J. Allmendinger, Chase Briscoe, Ross Chastain, and Brandon Jones were eligible to win after finishing in the top 4 at the Contender Boats 250 at Homestead.

=== Entry list ===
- (R) denotes rookie driver.
- (i) denotes driver who is ineligible for series driver points.

No.	Driver	Team	Manufacturer	Sponsor
0	Jeffrey Earnhardt	JD Motorsports	Chevrolet	Flexfit 110
1	Michael Annett	JR Motorsports	Chevrolet	Pilot/Flying J
02	Brett Moffitt (i)	Our Motorsports	Chevrolet	Fr8Auctions Camo
4	Jesse Little (R)	JD Motorsports	Chevrolet	SkuttleTight
5	Matt Mills	B. J. McLeod Motorsports	Toyota	J.F. Electric
6	B. J. McLeod	JD Motorsports	Chevrolet	Happy Father's Day/JD Motorsports
7	Justin Allgaier	JR Motorsports	Chevrolet	BRANDT/TradeMark Nitrogen
07	Gray Gaulding (i)	SS-Green Light Racing	Chevrolet	Walk-Ons Bistreux & Bar
8	Jeb Burton	JR Motorsports	Chevrolet	LS Tractor
08	Joe Graf Jr. (R)	SS-Green Light Racing	Chevrolet	Bucked Up Energy
9	Noah Gragson	JR Motorsports	Chevrolet	Hellmann's Roasted Garlic Sauce
10	Ross Chastain	Kaulig Racing	Chevrolet	Nutrien Ag Solutions
11	Justin Haley	Kaulig Racing	Chevrolet	LeafFilter Gutter Protection
13	Chad Finchum	MBM Motorsports	Toyota	Mohawk Market/Kahnawake Reserve
15	Robby Lyons	JD Motorsports	Chevrolet	Sunwest Construction
16	A. J. Allmendinger	Kaulig Racing	Chevrolet	Ellsworth Advisors
18	Riley Herbst (R)	Joe Gibbs Racing	Toyota	Monster Energy
19	Brandon Jones	Joe Gibbs Racing	Toyota	Menards/Atlas Designer Shingles
20	Harrison Burton (R)	Joe Gibbs Racing	Toyota	Morton Buildings/DEX Imaging
21	Anthony Alfredo	Richard Childress Racing	Chevrolet	Dude Wipes
22	Austin Cindric	Team Penske	Ford	MoneyLion
26	Colin Garrett	Sam Hunt Racing	Toyota	Rosie Network/The Jewelry Republic
36	Alex Labbé	DGM Racing	Chevrolet	Lake Wales High School: Congratulations Class of 2020!
38	Jeff Green	RSS Racing	Chevrolet	C2 Freight Resources
39	Ryan Sieg	RSS Racing	Chevrolet	CMR Construction Roofing/CMRRoofing.com
44	Tommy Joe Martins	Martins Motorsports	Chevrolet	AAN Adjusters
47	Joe Nemechek (i)	Mike Harmon Racing	Chevrolet	Patriots of America PAC/Boat Gadget
51	Jeremy Clements	Jeremy Clements Racing	Chevrolet	Repairables.com
52	Kody Vanderwal (R)	Means Racing	Chevrolet	ADVANCED DAIRY SERVICE
61	Timmy Hill (i)	Hattori Racing	Toyota	RoofClaim.com
66	John Jackson	MBM Motorsports	Toyota	James Carter Attorney at Law/CrashClaimsR.Us
68	Brandon Brown	Brandonbilt Motorsports	Chevrolet	Original Larry's Hard Lemonade Brewing Co.
74	Mike Harmon	Mike Harmon Racing	Chevrolet	#BackTheBlue
78	Vinnie Miller	B. J. McLeod Motorsports	Chevrolet	Koolbox ICE
90	Caesar Bacarella	DGM Racing	Chevrolet	Alpha Prime/Maxim
92	Josh Williams	DGM Racing	Chevrolet	Tedlar/General Formulations
93	Myatt Snider	RSS Racing	Chevrolet	Superior Essex/Louisiana Hot Sauce
98	Chase Briscoe	Stewart-Haas Racing	Ford	Ford Performance Racing School
99	Mason Massey	B. J. McLeod Motorsports	Toyota	Gerber Collision & Glass
Official entry list

== Qualifying ==
Justin Haley was awarded the pole for the race as determined by a random draw.

=== Starting Lineup ===
Pos	No	Driver	Team	Manufacturer
1	11	Justin Haley	Kaulig Racing	Chevrolet
2	1	Michael Annett	JR Motorsports	Chevrolet
3	39	Ryan Sieg	RSS Racing	Chevrolet
4	98	Chase Briscoe	Stewart-Haas Racing	Ford
5	9	Noah Gragson	JR Motorsports	Chevrolet
6	19	Brandon Jones	Joe Gibbs Racing	Toyota
7	22	Austin Cindric	Team Penske	Ford
8	8	Jeb Burton	JR Motorsports	Chevrolet
9	10	Ross Chastain	Kaulig Racing	Chevrolet
10	21	Anthony Alfredo	Richard Childress Racing	Chevrolet
11	20	Harrison Burton (R)	Joe Gibbs Racing	Toyota
12	7	Justin Allgaier	JR Motorsports	Chevrolet
13	0	Jeffrey Earnhardt	JD Motorsports	Chevrolet
14	15	Robby Lyons	JD Motorsports	Chevrolet
15	68	Brandon Brown	Brandonbilt Motorsports	Chevrolet
16	6	B. J. McLeod	JD Motorsports	Chevrolet
17	90	Caesar Bacarella	DGM Racing	Chevrolet
18	4	Jesse Little (R)	JD Motorsports	Chevrolet
19	51	Jeremy Clements	Jeremy Clements Racing	Chevrolet
20	02	Brett Moffitt (i)	Our Motorsports	Chevrolet
21	07	Gray Gaulding (i)	SS-Green Light Racing	Chevrolet
22	18	Riley Herbst (R)	Joe Gibbs Racing	Toyota
23	08	Joe Graf Jr. (R)	SS-Green Light Racing	Chevrolet
24	92	Josh Williams	DGM Racing	Chevrolet
25	74	Mike Harmon	Mike Harmon Racing	Chevrolet
26	52	Kody Vanderwal (R)	Means Racing	Chevrolet
27	36	Alex Labbé	DGM Racing	Chevrolet
28	78	Vinnie Miller	B. J. McLeod Motorsports	Chevrolet
29	47	Tim Viens (i)	Mike Harmon Racing	Chevrolet
30	13	Chad Finchum	MBM Motorsports	Toyota
31	93	Myatt Snider (R)	RSS Racing	Chevrolet
32	44	Tommy Joe Martins	Martins Motorsports	Chevrolet
33	61	Timmy Hill (i)	Hattori Racing	Chevrolet
34	16	A. J. Allmendinger	Kaulig Racing	Chevrolet
35	99	Mason Massey	B. J. McLeod Motorsports	Toyota
36	38	Jeff Green	RSS Racing	Chevrolet
37	5	Matt Mills	B. J. McLeod Motorsports	Toyota
38	66	John Jackson	MBM Motorsports	Toyota
39	26	Colin Garrett	Sam Hunt Racing	Toyota
Official starting lineup

- . – Eligible for Dash 4 Cash prize money.
- The No. 8 and No. 16 had to start from the rear due to failing pre-race inspection.
- The No. 47 had to start from the rear due to a driver change.
- The No. 99 had to start from the rear due to an unapproved adjustment.

== Race ==
=== Race results ===
==== Stage Results ====
Stage One

Laps: 25

Pos	No	Driver	Team	Manufacturer	Points
1	11	Justin Haley	Kaulig Racing	Chevrolet	10
2	21	Anthony Alfredo	Richard Childress Racing	Chevrolet	9
3	98	Chase Briscoe	Stewart-Haas Racing	Ford	8
4	10	Ross Chastain	Kaulig Racing	Chevrolet	7
5	19	Brandon Jones	Joe Gibbs Racing	Toyota	6
6	22	Austin Cindric	Team Penske	Ford	5
7	20	Harrison Burton (R)	Joe Gibbs Racing	Toyota	4
8	02	Brett Moffitt (i)	Our Motorsports	Chevrolet	0
9	1	Michael Annett	JR Motorsports	Chevrolet	2
10	07	Gray Gaulding (i)	SS-Green Light Racing	Chevrolet	0

Stage Two

Laps: 25

Pos	No	Driver	Team	Manufacturer	Points
1	98	Chase Briscoe	Stewart-Haas Racing	Ford	10
2	1	Michael Annett	JR Motorsports	Chevrolet	9
3	22	Austin Cindric	Team Penske	Ford	8
4	9	Noah Gragson	JR Motorsports	Chevrolet	7
5	10	Ross Chastain	Kaulig Racing	Chevrolet	6
6	11	Justin Haley	Kaulig Racing	Chevrolet	5
7	8	Jeb Burton	JR Motorsports	Chevrolet	4
8	19	Brandon Jones	Joe Gibbs Racing	Toyota	3
9	02	Brett Moffitt (i)	Our Motorsports	Chevrolet	0
10	68	Brandon Brown	Brandonbilt Motorsports	Chevrolet	1

=== Final Stage Results ===
Laps: 63

Pos	Grid	No	Driver	Team	Manufacturer	Laps	Points	Status
1	1	11	Justin Haley	Kaulig Racing	Chevrolet	113	55	Running
2	9	10	Ross Chastain	Kaulig Racing	Chevrolet	113	48	Running
3	8	8	Jeb Burton	JR Motorsports	Chevrolet	113	38	Running
4	7	22	Austin Cindric	Team Penske	Ford	113	46	Running
5	20	02	Brett Moffitt (i)	Our Motorsports	Chevrolet	113	0	Running
6	10	21	Anthony Alfredo	Richard Childress Racing	Chevrolet	113	40	Running
7	34	16	A. J. Allmendinger	Kaulig Racing	Chevrolet	113	30	Running
8	21	07	Gray Gaulding (i)	SS-Green Light Racing	Chevrolet	113	0	Running
9	27	36	Alex Labbé	DGM Racing	Chevrolet	113	28	Running
10	5	9	Noah Gragson	JR Motorsports	Chevrolet	113	34	Running
11	15	68	Brandon Brown	Brandonbilt Motorsports	Chevrolet	113	27	Running
12	2	1	Michael Annett	JR Motorsports	Chevrolet	113	36	Running
13	18	4	Jesse Little (R)	JD Motorsports	Chevrolet	113	24	Running
14	13	0	Jeffrey Earnhardt	JD Motorsports	Chevrolet	113	23	Running
15	32	44	Tommy Joe Martins	Martins Motorsports	Chevrolet	113	22	Running
16	6	19	Brandon Jones	Joe Gibbs Racing	Toyota	113	30	Running
17	17	90	Caesar Bacarella	DGM Racing	Chevrolet	113	20	Running
18	4	98	Chase Briscoe	Stewart-Haas Racing	Ford	113	37	Running
19	14	15	Robby Lyons	JD Motorsports	Chevrolet	113	18	Running
20	35	99	Mason Massey	B. J. McLeod Motorsports	Toyota	113	17	Running
21	28	78	Vinnie Miller	B. J. McLeod Motorsports	Chevrolet	113	16	Running
22	30	13	Chad Finchum	MBM Motorsports	Toyota	113	15	Running
23	16	6	B. J. McLeod	JD Motorsports	Chevrolet	113	14	Running
24	19	51	Jeremy Clements	Jeremy Clements Racing	Chevrolet	112	13	Running
25	25	74	Mike Harmon	Mike Harmon Racing	Chevrolet	112	12	Running
26	33	61	Timmy Hill (i)	Hattori Racing	Toyota	106	0	Accident
27	31	93	Myatt Snider (R)	RSS Racing	Chevrolet	105	10	Accident
28	12	7	Justin Allgaier	JR Motorsports	Chevrolet	105	9	Accident
29	36	38	Jeff Green	RSS Racing	Chevrolet	105	8	Accident
30	3	39	Ryan Sieg	RSS Racing	Chevrolet	101	7	Running
31	26	52	Kody Vanderwal (R)	Means Racing	Chevrolet	95	6	Accident
32	11	20	Harrison Burton (R)	Joe Gibbs Racing	Toyota	95	9	Accident
33	24	92	Josh Williams	DGM Racing	Chevrolet	95	4	Accident
34	23	08	Joe Graf Jr. (R)	SS-Green Light Racing	Chevrolet	95	3	Accident
35	39	26	Colin Garrett	Sam Hunt Racing	Toyota	95	2	Accident
36	29	47	Tim Viens (i)	Mike Harmon Racing	Chevrolet	90	0	Accident
37	22	18	Riley Herbst (R)	Joe Gibbs Racing	Toyota	76	1	Accident
38	37	5	Matt Mills	B. J. McLeod Motorsports	Toyota	65	1	Overheating
39	38	66	John Jackson	MBM Motorsports	Toyota	30	1	Overheating
Official race results

- . – Won the Dash 4 Cash prize money and subsequently qualified for the Dash 4 Cash prize money in the next race.
- . – Qualified for Dash 4 Cash prize money in the next race.

=== Race statistics ===
- Lead changes: 22 among 12 different drivers
- Cautions/Laps: 6 for 22
- Red flags: 2
- Time of race: 2 hours, 15 minutes, 52 seconds
- Average speed: 136.249 mph (219.272 km/h)

== Media ==
=== Television ===
The Unhinged 300 was carried by FS1 in the United States. Adam Alexander, Stewart-Haas Racing driver Aric Almirola, and Jamie McMurray called the race from the Fox Sports Studio in Charlotte, with Jamie Little and Vince Welch covering pit road.

FS1
Booth announcers	Pit reporter
Lap-by-lap: Adam Alexander Color-commentator: Aric Almirola Color-commentator: Jamie McMurray	Jamie Little Vince Welch

=== Radio ===
The Motor Racing Network (MRN) called the race for radio, which was simulcast on SiriusXM NASCAR Radio.

== Standings after the race ==
Drivers' Championship standings

	Pos	Driver	Points
	1	Noah Gragson	469
	2	Chase Briscoe	454 (-15)
1	3	Austin Cindric	426 (-43)
1	4	Ross Chastain	422 (-47)
2	5	Harrison Burton (R)	399 (-70)
1	6	Justin Haley	385 (-84)
1	7	Brandon Jones	375 (-94)
	8	Justin Allgaier	337 (-132)
1	9	Michael Annett	296 (-173)
1	10	Ryan Sieg	273 (-196)
	11	Riley Herbst (R)	257 (-212)
1	12	Brandon Brown	250 (-219)
Official driver's standings

- Note: Only the first 12 positions are included for the driver standings.
- . – Driver has clinched a position in the NASCAR playoffs.

Previous race: 2020 Contender Boats 250	NASCAR Xfinity Series; 2020 season	Next race: 2020 Pocono Green 225
