= 2020 EchoPark 250 =

NASCAR Xfinity Series race

Race details
- Race 8 of 33 in the 2020 NASCAR Xfinity Series season
- Date: June 6, 2020
- Location: Atlanta Motor Speedway in Hampton, Georgia
- Course: Permanent racing facility
- Course length: 1.54 miles (2.48 km)
- Distance: 163 laps, 251 mi (403 km)

Pole position
Driver	Noah Gragson	JR Motorsports
- Grid positions set by ballot

Most laps led
Driver	Austin Cindric	Team Penske
- Laps: 68

Winner
No. 16	A. J. Allmendinger	Kaulig Racing

Television in the United States
- Network: Fox
- Announcers: Adam Alexander, Clint Bowyer, and Jamie McMurray

Radio in the United States
- Radio: PRN
- Booth announcers: Doug Rice and Mark Garrow
- Turn announcers: Rob Albright (1 & 2) and Pat Patterson (3 & 4)

The 2020 EchoPark 250 was a NASCAR Xfinity Series race held on June 6, 2020, at Atlanta Motor Speedway in Hampton, Georgia. Contested over 163 laps on the 1.54-mile (2.48 km) asphalt quad-oval intermediate speedway, it was the eighth race of the 2020 NASCAR Xfinity Series season and the season's first Dash 4 Cash race. Kaulig Racing part-time driver A. J. Allmendinger won his first ever race on a NASCAR oval.

The race was originally scheduled to be held on March 14, but was rescheduled due to the COVID-19 pandemic.

== Report ==
=== Background ===
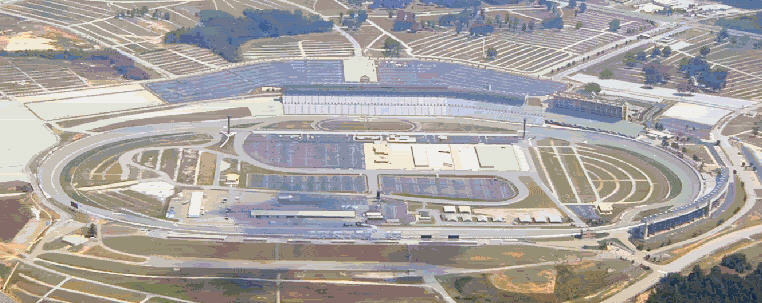
Atlanta Motor Speedway, the track where the race was held.

Atlanta Motor Speedway (formerly Atlanta International Raceway) is a track in Hampton, Georgia, 20 miles (32 km) south of Atlanta. It is a 1.54-mile (2.48 km) quad-oval track with a seating capacity of 111,000. It opened in 1960 as a 1.5-mile (2.4 km) standard oval. In 1994, 46 condominiums were built over the northeastern side of the track. In 1997, to standardize the track with Speedway Motorsports' other two 1.5-mile (2.4 km) ovals, the entire track was almost completely rebuilt. The frontstretch and backstretch were swapped, and the configuration of the track was changed from oval to quad-oval. The project made the track one of the fastest on the NASCAR circuit.

The race was held without fans in attendance due to the ongoing COVID-19 pandemic.

=== Dash 4 Cash ===
The Dash 4 Cash is a series of four races in the NASCAR Xfinity Series, preceded by a qualifying race. The top four points-eligible drivers in the previous race are eligible to win a $100,000 bonus on top of their race winnings if they win the race. Cup Series regulars are not permitted to compete in the races.

The EchoPark 250 was the season's first Dash 4 Cash race. Noah Gragson, Chase Briscoe, Brandon Jones, and rookie Harrison Burton were eligible to win after finishing in the top 4 at the Cheddar's 300 at Bristol.

=== Entry list ===
- (R) denotes rookie driver.
- (i) denotes driver who is ineligible for series driver points.

No.	Driver	Team	Manufacturer
0	Jeffrey Earnhardt	JD Motorsports	Chevrolet
1	Michael Annett	JR Motorsports	Chevrolet
02	Brett Moffitt (i)	Our Motorsports	Chevrolet
4	Jesse Little (R)	JD Motorsports	Chevrolet
5	Matt Mills	B. J. McLeod Motorsports	Chevrolet
6	B. J. McLeod	JD Motorsports	Chevrolet
7	Justin Allgaier	JR Motorsports	Chevrolet
07	Garrett Smithley	SS-Green Light Racing	Chevrolet
8	Daniel Hemric	JR Motorsports	Chevrolet
08	Joe Graf Jr. (R)	SS-Green Light Racing	Chevrolet
9	Noah Gragson	JR Motorsports	Chevrolet
10	Ross Chastain	Kaulig Racing	Chevrolet
11	Justin Haley	Kaulig Racing	Chevrolet
13	Chad Finchum	MBM Motorsports	Toyota
15	Colby Howard	JD Motorsports	Chevrolet
16	A. J. Allmendinger	Kaulig Racing	Chevrolet
18	Riley Herbst (R)	Joe Gibbs Racing	Toyota
19	Brandon Jones	Joe Gibbs Racing	Toyota
20	Harrison Burton (R)	Joe Gibbs Racing	Toyota
21	Anthony Alfredo	Richard Childress Racing	Chevrolet
22	Austin Cindric	Team Penske	Ford
36	Ronnie Bassett Jr.	DGM Racing	Chevrolet
39	Ryan Sieg	RSS Racing	Chevrolet
44	Tommy Joe Martins	Martins Motorsports	Chevrolet
47	Joe Nemechek (i)	Mike Harmon Racing	Chevrolet
51	Jeremy Clements	Jeremy Clements Racing	Chevrolet
52	Kody Vanderwal (R)	Means Racing	Chevrolet
61	Timmy Hill (i)	Hattori Racing	Toyota
66	Stephen Leicht	MBM Motorsports	Toyota
68	Brandon Brown	Brandonbilt Motorsports	Chevrolet
74	Bayley Currey (i)	Mike Harmon Racing	Chevrolet
78	Vinnie Miller	B. J. McLeod Motorsports	Chevrolet
90	Alex Labbé	DGM Racing	Chevrolet
92	Josh Williams	DGM Racing	Chevrolet
93	Myatt Snider	RSS Racing	Chevrolet
98	Chase Briscoe	Stewart-Haas Racing	Ford
99	Mason Massey	B. J. McLeod Motorsports	Toyota
Official entry list

== Qualifying ==
Noah Gragson was awarded the pole for the race as determined by a random draw.

=== Starting Lineup ===
Pos	No	Driver	Team	Manufacturer
1	9	Noah Gragson	JR Motorsports	Chevrolet
2	8	Daniel Hemric	JR Motorsports	Chevrolet
3	7	Justin Allgaier	JR Motorsports	Chevrolet
4	11	Justin Haley	Kaulig Racing	Chevrolet
5	20	Harrison Burton (R)	Joe Gibbs Racing	Toyota
6	18	Riley Herbst (R)	Joe Gibbs Racing	Toyota
7	39	Ryan Sieg	RSS Racing	Chevrolet
8	22	Austin Cindric	Team Penske	Ford
9	98	Chase Briscoe	Stewart-Haas Racing	Ford
10	68	Brandon Brown	Brandonbilt Motorsports	Chevrolet
11	10	Ross Chastain	Kaulig Racing	Chevrolet
12	19	Brandon Jones	Joe Gibbs Racing	Toyota
13	02	Brett Moffitt (i)	Our Motorsports	Chevrolet
14	4	Jesse Little (R)	JD Motorsports	Chevrolet
15	90	Alex Labbé	DGM Racing	Chevrolet
16	0	Jeffrey Earnhardt	JD Motorsports	Chevrolet
17	6	B. J. McLeod	JD Motorsports	Chevrolet
18	13	Chad Finchum	MBM Motorsports	Toyota
19	78	Vinnie Miller	B. J. McLeod Motorsports	Chevrolet
20	51	Jeremy Clements	Jeremy Clements Racing	Chevrolet
21	1	Michael Annett	JR Motorsports	Chevrolet
22	07	Garrett Smithley	SS-Green Light Racing	Chevrolet
23	92	Josh Williams	DGM Racing	Chevrolet
24	21	Anthony Alfredo	Richard Childress Racing	Chevrolet
25	99	Mason Massey	B. J. McLeod Motorsports	Toyota
26	5	Matt Mills	B. J. McLeod Motorsports	Chevrolet
27	08	Joe Graf Jr. (R)	SS-Green Light Racing	Chevrolet
28	47	Joe Nemechek (i)	Mike Harmon Racing	Chevrolet
29	61	Timmy Hill (i)	Hattori Racing	Toyota
30	16	A. J. Allmendinger	Kaulig Racing	Chevrolet
31	74	Bayley Currey (i)	Mike Harmon Racing	Chevrolet
32	36	Ronnie Bassett Jr.	DGM Racing	Chevrolet
33	44	Tommy Joe Martins	Martins Motorsports	Chevrolet
34	15	Colby Howard	JD Motorsports	Chevrolet
35	93	Myatt Snider	RSS Racing	Chevrolet
36	52	Kody Vanderwal (R)	Means Racing	Chevrolet
37	66	Stephen Leicht	MBM Motorsports	Toyota
Official starting lineup

- . – Eligible for Dash 4 Cash prize money.
- The No. 44 of Tommy Joe Martins had to start from the rear due to unapproved adjustments.
- The No. 61 of Timmy Hill had to start from the rear on pace laps due to pitting before the green flag.

== Race ==
=== Race results ===
==== Stage Results ====
Stage One

Laps: 40

Pos	No	Driver	Team	Manufacturer	Points
1	22	Austin Cindric	Team Penske	Ford	10
2	10	Ross Chastain	Kaulig Racing	Chevrolet	9
3	11	Justin Haley	Kaulig Racing	Chevrolet	8
4	7	Justin Allgaier	JR Motorsports	Chevrolet	7
5	8	Daniel Hemric	JR Motorsports	Chevrolet	6
6	9	Noah Gragson	JR Motorsports	Chevrolet	5
7	18	Riley Herbst (R)	Joe Gibbs Racing	Toyota	4
8	98	Chase Briscoe	Stewart-Haas Racing	Ford	3
9	16	A. J. Allmendinger	Kaulig Racing	Chevrolet	2
10	20	Harrison Burton (R)	Joe Gibbs Racing	Toyota	1

Stage Two

Laps: 40

Pos	No	Driver	Team	Manufacturer	Points
1	22	Austin Cindric	Team Penske	Ford	10
2	98	Chase Briscoe	Stewart-Haas Racing	Ford	9
3	10	Ross Chastain	Kaulig Racing	Chevrolet	8
4	8	Daniel Hemric	JR Motorsports	Chevrolet	7
5	16	A. J. Allmendinger	Kaulig Racing	Chevrolet	6
6	9	Noah Gragson	JR Motorsports	Chevrolet	5
7	11	Justin Haley	Kaulig Racing	Chevrolet	4
8	7	Justin Allgaier	JR Motorsports	Chevrolet	3
9	1	Michael Annett	JR Motorsports	Chevrolet	2
10	20	Harrison Burton (R)	Joe Gibbs Racing	Toyota	1

=== Final Stage Results ===
Laps: 83

Pos	Grid	No	Driver	Team	Manufacturer	Laps	Points	Status
1	30	16	A. J. Allmendinger	Kaulig Racing	Chevrolet	163	48	Running
2	1	9	Noah Gragson	JR Motorsports	Chevrolet	163	45	Running
3	4	11	Justin Haley	Kaulig Racing	Chevrolet	163	46	Running
4	2	8	Daniel Hemric	JR Motorsports	Chevrolet	163	46	Running
5	5	20	Harrison Burton (R)	Joe Gibbs Racing	Toyota	163	34	Running
6	3	7	Justin Allgaier	JR Motorsports	Chevrolet	163	41	Running
7	11	10	Ross Chastain	Kaulig Racing	Chevrolet	163	47	Running
8	12	19	Brandon Jones	Joe Gibbs Racing	Toyota	163	29	Running
9	9	98	Chase Briscoe	Stewart-Haas Racing	Ford	163	40	Running
10	24	21	Anthony Alfredo	Richard Childress Racing	Chevrolet	163	27	Running
11	21	1	Michael Annett	JR Motorsports	Chevrolet	163	28	Running
12	10	68	Brandon Brown	Brandonbilt Motorsports	Chevrolet	163	25	Running
13	20	51	Jeremy Clements	Jeremy Clements Racing	Chevrolet	163	24	Running
14	13	02	Brett Moffitt (i)	Our Motorsports	Chevrolet	163	0	Running
15	34	15	Colby Howard	JD Motorsports	Chevrolet	163	22	Running
16	8	22	Austin Cindric	Team Penske	Ford	163	41	Running
17	6	18	Riley Herbst (R)	Joe Gibbs Racing	Toyota	163	24	Running
18	31	74	Bayley Currey (i)	Mike Harmon Racing	Chevrolet	163	0	Running
19	32	36	Ronnie Bassett Jr.	DGM Racing	Chevrolet	162	18	Running
20	14	4	Jesse Little (R)	JD Motorsports	Chevrolet	162	17	Running
21	16	0	Jeffrey Earnhardt	JD Motorsports	Chevrolet	162	16	Running
22	33	44	Tommy Joe Martins	Martins Motorsports	Chevrolet	162	15	Running
23	25	99	Mason Massey	B. J. McLeod Motorsports	Toyota	162	14	Running
24	22	07	Garrett Smithley	SS-Green Light Racing	Chevrolet	162	13	Running
25	17	6	B. J. McLeod	JD Motorsports	Chevrolet	162	12	Running
26	27	08	Joe Graf Jr. (R)	SS-Green Light Racing	Chevrolet	162	11	Running
27	15	90	Alex Labbé	DGM Racing	Chevrolet	162	10	Running
28	23	92	Josh Williams	DGM Racing	Chevrolet	162	9	Running
29	35	93	Myatt Snider	RSS Racing	Chevrolet	161	8	Running
30	26	5	Matt Mills	B. J. McLeod Motorsports	Chevrolet	161	7	Running
31	19	78	Vinnie Miller	B. J. McLeod Motorsports	Chevrolet	156	6	Running
32	28	47	Joe Nemechek (i)	Mike Harmon Racing	Chevrolet	129	0	Suspension
33	29	61	Timmy Hill (i)	Hattori Racing	Toyota	87	0	Alternator
34	18	13	Chad Finchum	MBM Motorsports	Toyota	50	3	Suspension
35	7	39	Ryan Sieg	RSS Racing	Chevrolet	47	2	Engine
36	37	66	Stephen Leicht	MBM Motorsports	Toyota	8	1	Clutch
37	36	52	Kody Vanderwal (R)	Means Racing	Chevrolet	3	1	Engine
Official race results

- . – Won the Dash 4 Cash prize money and subsequently qualified for the Dash 4 Cash prize money in the next race.
- . – Qualified for Dash 4 Cash prize money in the next race.

=== Race statistics ===
- Lead changes: 10 among 7 different drivers
- Cautions/Laps: 6 for 28
- Red flags: 0
- Time of race: 2 hours, 2 minutes, 37 seconds
- Average speed: 122.832 mph (197.679 km/h)

== Media ==
=== Television ===
The EchoPark 250 was carried by Fox in the United States. Adam Alexander, Stewart-Haas Racing driver Clint Bowyer, and Jamie McMurray called the race from the Fox Sports Studio in Charlotte, with Jamie Little covering pit road.

Fox
Booth announcers	Pit reporter
Lap-by-lap: Adam Alexander Color-commentator: Clint Bowyer Color-commentator: Jamie McMurray	Jamie Little

=== Radio ===
The Performance Racing Network (PRN) called the race for radio, which was simulcast on SiriusXM NASCAR Radio. Doug Rice and Mark Garrow anchored the action from the booth. Rob Albright called the race from turns 1 & 2 and Pat Patterson called the action through turns 3 & 4. Brad Gillie, Brett McMillan, and Doug Turnbull provided reports from pit road.

PRN Radio
Booth announcers	Turn announcers	Pit reporters
Lead announcer: Doug Rice Announcer: Mark Garrow	Turns 1 & 2: Rob Albright Turns 3 & 4: Pat Patterson	Brad Gillie Brett McMillan Doug Turnbull

== Standings after the race ==
Drivers' Championship standings

	Pos	Driver	Points
	1	Chase Briscoe	340
	2	Noah Gragson	336 (-4)
	3	Harrison Burton (R)	308 (-32)
	4	Justin Allgaier	297 (-43)
	5	Ross Chastain	295 (-45)
	6	Austin Cindric	285 (-55)
1	7	Justin Haley	267 (-73)
1	8	Brandon Jones	258 (-82)
2	9	Daniel Hemric	222 (-118)
1	10	Ryan Sieg	217 (-123)
1	11	Riley Herbst (R)	201 (-139)
	12	Brandon Brown	199 (-141)
Official driver's standings

- Note: Only the first 12 positions are included for the driver standings.
- . – Driver has clinched a position in the NASCAR playoffs.

Previous race: 2020 Cheddar's 300	NASCAR Xfinity Series; 2020 season	Next race: 2020 Hooters 250
