= 2021 Credit Karma Money 250 =

Race details
- Race 18 of 33 in the 2021 NASCAR Xfinity Series
- Date: July 10, 2021
- Location: Hampton, Georgia, Atlanta Motor Speedway
- Course: Permanent racing facility
- Course length: 1.54 miles (2.478 km)
- Distance: 164 laps, 252.56 mi (406.456 km)
- Scheduled distance: 163 laps, 251.02 mi (403.978 km)
- Average speed: 109.032 miles per hour (175.470 km/h)

Pole position
Driver	Kyle Busch	Joe Gibbs Racing
- Grid positions set by competition-based formula

Most laps led
Driver	Kyle Busch	Joe Gibbs Racing
- Laps: 97

Winner
No. 54	Kyle Busch	Joe Gibbs Racing

Television in the United States
- Network: NBCSN
- Announcers: Rick Allen, Jeff Burton, Dale Earnhardt Jr., Steve Letarte

Radio in the United States
- Radio: Performance Racing Network

The 2021 Credit Karma Money 250 was the 18th stock car race of the 2021 NASCAR Xfinity Series season, and the inaugural running of the event, when NASCAR decided to return to Atlanta for two races a year instead of the previous one. The race was held on Saturday, July 10, 2021 in Hampton, Georgia at Atlanta Motor Speedway, a 1.54 miles (2.48 km) permanent asphalt quad-oval intermediate speedway. The race was extended to 164 laps from the scheduled 163 due to a green–white–checkered finish. In a historic 102nd win in the NASCAR Xfinity Series, Kyle Busch of Joe Gibbs Racing would win his last race for the team, and his last NASCAR Xfinity Series win as he would tragically pass away on May 21, 2026. Jeb Burton of Kaulig Racing and Noah Gragson of JR Motorsports would score the rest of the podium positions, taking 2nd and 3rd, respectively.

The layout of Atlanta Motor Speedway, the venue where the race was held.

== Background ==
Atlanta Motor Speedway (formerly Atlanta International Raceway) is a track in Hampton, Georgia, 20 miles (32 km) south of Atlanta. It is a 1.54-mile (2.48 km) quad-oval track with a seating capacity of 111,000. It opened in 1960 as a 1.5-mile (2.4 km) standard oval. In 1994, 46 condominiums were built over the northeastern side of the track. In 1997, to standardize the track with Speedway Motorsports' other two 1.5-mile (2.4 km) ovals, the entire track was almost completely rebuilt. The frontstretch and backstretch were swapped, and the configuration of the track was changed from oval to quad-oval. The project made the track one of the fastest on the NASCAR circuit.

=== Entry list ===
#	Driver	Team	Make	Sponsor
0	Jeffrey Earnhardt	JD Motorsports	Chevrolet	Superstratum
1	Austin Dillon	JR Motorsports	Chevrolet	Pilot Flying J Spicy Chicken Sandwich
2	Myatt Snider	Richard Childress Racing	Chevrolet	Crosley Furniture
02	Brett Moffitt	Our Motorsports	Chevrolet	Concrete Supply, Destiny Homes
4	Landon Cassill	JD Motorsports	Chevrolet	Voyager
5	Matt Mills	B. J. McLeod Motorsports	Chevrolet	J. F. Electric
6	Ryan Vargas	JD Motorsports	Chevrolet	MaintenX Total Facilities Repair Experts
7	Justin Allgaier	JR Motorsports	Chevrolet	Hellowater Defense
07	Joe Graf, Jr.	SS-Green Light Racing	Chevrolet	Z Grills
8	Sam Mayer	JR Motorsports	Chevrolet	QPS Employment Group
9	Noah Gragson	JR Motorsports	Chevrolet	Bass Pro Shops, Black Rifle Coffee Company
10	Jeb Burton	Kaulig Racing	Chevrolet	Nutrien Ag Solutions
11	Justin Haley	Kaulig Racing	Chevrolet	LeafFilter Gutter Protection
13	Timmy Hill	MBM Motorsports	Toyota	
15	Colby Howard	JD Motorsports	Chevrolet	Project Hope Foundation
16	A.J. Allmendinger	Kaulig Racing	Chevrolet	HyperIce
17	Carson Ware	Rick Ware Racing	Chevrolet	Jacob Companies
18	Daniel Hemric	Joe Gibbs Racing	Toyota	Poppy Bank
19	Brandon Jones	Joe Gibbs Racing	Toyota	Toyota
20	Harrison Burton	Joe Gibbs Racing	Toyota	Offerpad "Awesome Different"
22	Austin Cindric	Team Penske	Ford	Carshop
23	Ty Dillon	Our Motorsports	Chevrolet	Childress Vineyards
26	Santino Ferrucci	Sam Hunt Racing	Toyota	Manatawny Still Works
31	Josh Berry	Jordan Anderson Racing	Chevrolet	Bommarito Automotive Group
36	Alex Labbé	DGM Racing	Chevrolet	Larue Industrial Snowblowers
39	Ryan Sieg	RSS Racing	Ford	A-Game Energy "The Ultimate In Hydration"
44	Tommy Joe Martins	Martins Motorsports	Chevrolet	Diamond Gusset Jeans
47	Kyle Weatherman	Mike Harmon Racing	Chevrolet	AXE Crossbows
48	Jade Buford	Big Machine Racing Team	Chevrolet	Big Machine Vodka Spiked Cooler
51	Jeremy Clements	Jeremy Clements Racing	Chevrolet	All South Electric
52	Gray Gaulding	Jimmy Means Racing	Chevrolet	Panini America
54	Kyle Busch	Joe Gibbs Racing	Toyota	Extra Gum
61	David Starr	Hattori Racing Enterprises	Toyota	Whataburger
66	C.J. McLaughlin	MBM Motorsports	Ford	SA Recycling
68	Brandon Brown	Brandonbilt Motorsports	Chevrolet	BabyDoge
74	Bayley Currey	Mike Harmon Racing	Chevrolet	Mike Harmon Racing
78	Jesse Little	B. J. McLeod Motorsports	Toyota	B. J. McLeod Motorsports
90	Ronnie Bassett, Jr.	DGM Racing	Chevrolet	DGM Racing
92	Josh Williams	DGM Racing	Chevrolet	Coolray Heating & AC
98	Riley Herbst	Stewart-Haas Racing	Ford	Monster Energy
99	Mason Massey	B. J. McLeod Motorsports	Toyota	Anderson Power Services
Official entry list

== Starting lineup ==
The starting lineup for the race was decided by a formula based on the previous race, the 2021 Henry 180. As a result, Kyle Busch of Joe Gibbs Racing would win the pole.

Pos.	#	Driver	Team	Make
1	54	Kyle Busch	Joe Gibbs Racing	Toyota
2	18	Daniel Hemric	Joe Gibbs Racing	Toyota
3	16	A.J. Allmendinger	Kaulig Racing	Chevrolet
4	22	Austin Cindric	Team Penske	Ford
5	20	Harrison Burton	Joe Gibbs Racing	Toyota
6	1	Austin Dillon	JR Motorsports	Chevrolet
7	11	Justin Haley	Kaulig Racing	Chevrolet
8	7	Justin Allgaier	JR Motorsports	Chevrolet
9	9	Noah Gragson	JR Motorsports	Chevrolet
10	98	Riley Herbst	Stewart-Haas Racing	Ford
11	10	Jeb Burton	Kaulig Racing	Chevrolet
12	68	Brandon Brown	Brandonbilt Motorsports	Chevrolet
13	19	Brandon Jones	Joe Gibbs Racing	Toyota
14	44	Tommy Joe Martins	Martins Motorsports	Chevrolet
15	2	Myatt Snider	Richard Childress Racing	Chevrolet
16	39	Ryan Sieg	RSS Racing	Ford
17	36	Alex Labbé	DGM Racing	Chevrolet
18	92	Josh Williams	DGM Racing	Chevrolet
19	51	Jeremy Clements	Jeremy Clements Racing	Chevrolet
20	02	Brett Moffitt	Our Motorsports	Chevrolet
21	4	Landon Cassill	JD Motorsports	Chevrolet
22	8	Sam Mayer	JR Motorsports	Chevrolet
23	99	Mason Massey	B. J. McLeod Motorsports	Toyota
24	5	Matt Mills	B. J. McLeod Motorsports	Chevrolet
25	26	Santino Ferrucci	Sam Hunt Racing	Toyota
26	17	Carson Ware	Rick Ware Racing	Chevrolet
27	48	Jade Buford	Big Machine Racing Team	Chevrolet
28	31	Josh Berry	Jordan Anderson Racing	Chevrolet
29	90	Ronnie Bassett, Jr.	DGM Racing	Chevrolet
30	23	Ty Dillon	Our Motorsports	Chevrolet
31	78	Jesse Little	B. J. McLeod Motorsports	Toyota
32	6	Ryan Vargas	JD Motorsports	Chevrolet
33	07	Joe Graf, Jr.	SS-Green Light Racing	Chevrolet
34	66	C.J. McLaughlin	MBM Motorsports	Ford
35	61	David Starr	Hattori Racing Enterprises	Toyota
36	15	Colby Howard	JD Motorsports	Chevrolet
37	0	Jeffrey Earnhardt	JD Motorsports	Chevrolet
38	47	Kyle Weatherman	Mike Harmon Racing	Chevrolet
39	74	Bayley Currey	Mike Harmon Racing	Chevrolet
40	52	Gray Gaulding	Jimmy Means Racing	Chevrolet
Failed to qualify
41	13	Timmy Hill	MBM Motorsports	Toyota
Official starting lineup

== Race results ==
Stage 1 Laps: 40

Fin	#	Driver	Team	Make	Pts
1	54	Kyle Busch	Joe Gibbs Racing	Toyota	0
2	16	A.J. Allmendinger	Kaulig Racing	Chevrolet	9
3	20	Harrison Burton	Joe Gibbs Racing	Toyota	8
4	18	Daniel Hemric	Joe Gibbs Racing	Toyota	7
5	9	Noah Gragson	JR Motorsports	Chevrolet	6
6	02	Brett Moffitt	Our Motorsports	Chevrolet	5
7	36	Alex Labbé	DGM Racing	Chevrolet	4
8	11	Justin Haley	Kaulig Racing	Chevrolet	3
9	19	Brandon Jones	Joe Gibbs Racing	Toyota	2
10	1	Austin Dillon	JR Motorsports	Chevrolet	0

Stage 2 Laps: 40

Fin	#	Driver	Team	Make	Pts
1	54	Kyle Busch	Joe Gibbs Racing	Toyota	0
2	16	A.J. Allmendinger	Kaulig Racing	Chevrolet	9
3	9	Noah Gragson	JR Motorsports	Chevrolet	8
4	7	Justin Allgaier	JR Motorsports	Chevrolet	7
5	18	Daniel Hemric	Joe Gibbs Racing	Toyota	6
6	20	Harrison Burton	Joe Gibbs Racing	Toyota	5
7	02	Brett Moffitt	Our Motorsports	Chevrolet	4
8	23	Ty Dillon	Our Motorsports	Chevrolet	3
9	11	Justin Haley	Kaulig Racing	Chevrolet	2
10	1	Austin Dillon	JR Motorsports	Chevrolet	0

Stage 3 Laps: 84

Fin	St	#	Driver	Team	Make	Laps	Led	Status	Pts
1	1	54	Kyle Busch	Joe Gibbs Racing	Toyota	164	97	running	0
2	11	10	Jeb Burton	Kaulig Racing	Chevrolet	164	1	running	35
3	9	9	Noah Gragson	JR Motorsports	Chevrolet	164	5	running	48
4	7	11	Justin Haley	Kaulig Racing	Chevrolet	164	0	running	38
5	30	23	Ty Dillon	Our Motorsports	Chevrolet	164	4	running	35
6	20	02	Brett Moffitt	Our Motorsports	Chevrolet	164	0	running	40
7	8	7	Justin Allgaier	JR Motorsports	Chevrolet	164	4	running	37
8	19	51	Jeremy Clements	Jeremy Clements Racing	Chevrolet	164	0	running	29
9	22	8	Sam Mayer	JR Motorsports	Chevrolet	164	0	running	28
10	4	22	Austin Cindric	Team Penske	Ford	164	0	running	27
11	6	1	Austin Dillon	JR Motorsports	Chevrolet	164	0	running	0
12	16	39	Ryan Sieg	RSS Racing	Ford	164	0	running	25
13	3	16	A.J. Allmendinger	Kaulig Racing	Chevrolet	164	2	running	42
14	32	6	Ryan Vargas	JD Motorsports	Chevrolet	164	0	running	23
15	17	36	Alex Labbé	DGM Racing	Chevrolet	164	0	running	26
16	14	44	Tommy Joe Martins	Martins Motorsports	Chevrolet	164	0	running	21
17	27	48	Jade Buford	Big Machine Racing Team	Chevrolet	164	0	running	20
18	18	92	Josh Williams	DGM Racing	Chevrolet	164	0	running	19
19	10	98	Riley Herbst	Stewart-Haas Racing	Ford	164	0	running	18
20	36	15	Colby Howard	JD Motorsports	Chevrolet	164	0	running	17
21	15	2	Myatt Snider	Richard Childress Racing	Chevrolet	164	0	running	16
22	37	0	Jeffrey Earnhardt	JD Motorsports	Chevrolet	164	0	running	15
23	28	31	Josh Berry	Jordan Anderson Racing	Chevrolet	164	0	running	14
24	5	20	Harrison Burton	Joe Gibbs Racing	Toyota	164	3	running	26
25	33	07	Joe Graf, Jr.	SS-Green Light Racing	Chevrolet	164	0	running	12
26	24	5	Matt Mills	B. J. McLeod Motorsports	Chevrolet	164	0	running	11
27	29	90	Ronnie Bassett, Jr.	DGM Racing	Chevrolet	164	0	running	10
28	31	78	Jesse Little	B. J. McLeod Motorsports	Toyota	164	0	running	9
29	23	99	Mason Massey	B. J. McLeod Motorsports	Toyota	164	0	running	8
30	2	18	Daniel Hemric	Joe Gibbs Racing	Toyota	164	45	running	20
31	12	68	Brandon Brown	Brandonbilt Motorsports	Chevrolet	163	0	accident	6
32	38	47	Kyle Weatherman	Mike Harmon Racing	Chevrolet	142	3	accident	5
33	25	26	Santino Ferrucci	Sam Hunt Racing	Toyota	162	0	running	4
34	39	74	Bayley Currey	Mike Harmon Racing	Chevrolet	162	0	running	0
35	40	52	Gray Gaulding	Jimmy Means Racing	Chevrolet	160	0	running	2
36	26	17	Carson Ware	Rick Ware Racing	Chevrolet	139	0	accident	1
37	34	66	C.J. McLaughlin	MBM Motorsports	Ford	139	0	running	0
38	21	4	Landon Cassill	JD Motorsports	Chevrolet	128	0	running	1
39	13	19	Brandon Jones	Joe Gibbs Racing	Toyota	118	0	accident	3
40	35	61	David Starr	Hattori Racing Enterprises	Toyota	50	0	accident	1
Failed to qualify
41		13	Timmy Hill	MBM Motorsports	Toyota				
Official race results

Previous race: 2021 Henry 180	NASCAR Xfinity Series; 2021 season	Next race: 2021 Ambetter Get Vaccinated 200
