= 2021 Pocono Green 225 =

2021 Pocono Green 225 recycled by J.P. Mascaro & Sons
Race details
- Race 16 of 33 in the 2021 NASCAR Xfinity Series
- Date: June 27, 2021
- Location: Long Pond, Pennsylvania, Pocono Raceway
- Course: Permanent racing facility
- Course length: 2.5 miles (4.023 km)
- Distance: 90 laps, 225 mi (362.102 km)
- Average speed: 117.511 miles per hour (189.116 km/h)

Pole position
Driver	Harrison Burton	Joe Gibbs Racing
- Grid positions set by competition-based formula

Most laps led
Driver	Austin Cindric	Team Penske
- Laps: 26

Winner
No. 22	Austin Cindric	Team Penske

Television in the United States
- Network: NBCSN
- Announcers: Rick Allen, Steve Letarte, Jeff Burton, Dale Earnhardt Jr.

Radio in the United States
- Radio: Motor Racing Network

The 2021 Pocono Green 225 recycled by J.P. Mascaro & Sons was the 16th race of the 2021 NASCAR Xfinity Series season, and the 6th iteration of the event. The event was held on Sunday, June 27, 2021 in Long Pond, Pennsylvania at Pocono Raceway, a 2.5 miles (4.0 km) triangular permanent course. The race took 90 laps to complete. Austin Cindric of Team Penske would win the race, after a scare for Cindric, as Cindric suffered lapped traffic during the last laps of the race. Ty Gibbs of Joe Gibbs Racing and Justin Allgaier of JR Motorsports would take the rest of the podium positions, finishing 2nd and 3rd, respectively.

== Background ==
=== Entry list ===
#	Driver	Team	Make	Sponsor
0	Jeffrey Earnhardt	JD Motorsports	Chevrolet	ForeverLawn Premium Synthetic Grass
1	Michael Annett	JR Motorsports	Chevrolet	Pilot, Flying J
2	Myatt Snider	Richard Childress Racing	Chevrolet	Crosley Furniture
02	Brett Moffitt	Our Motorsports	Chevrolet	Sokal Digital
4	Landon Cassill	JD Motorsports	Chevrolet	Voyager
5	Matt Mills	B. J. McLeod Motorsports	Chevrolet	J. F. Electric
6	Ryan Vargas	JD Motorsports	Chevrolet	Fly High Brian Lear
7	Justin Allgaier	JR Motorsports	Chevrolet	Hellmann's 100% Recycled "Make Taste, Not Waste"
07	Joe Graf, Jr.	SS-Green Light Racing	Chevrolet	G Coin
8	Sam Mayer	JR Motorsports	Chevrolet	Tire Pros
9	Noah Gragson	JR Motorsports	Chevrolet	Bass Pro Shops, Black Rifle Coffee Company
10	Jeb Burton	Kaulig Racing	Chevrolet	Chevrolet
11	Justin Haley	Kaulig Racing	Chevrolet	LeafFilter Gutter Protection
13	Timmy Hill	MBM Motorsports	Toyota	
15	Colby Howard	JD Motorsports	Chevrolet	Save America Now PAC
16	A.J. Allmendinger	Kaulig Racing	Chevrolet	HyperIce
17	Carson Ware	Rick Ware Racing	Chevrolet	Jacob Companies
18	Daniel Hemric	Joe Gibbs Racing	Toyota	Poppy Bank
19	Brandon Jones	Joe Gibbs Racing	Toyota	Menards, Pelonis
20	Harrison Burton	Joe Gibbs Racing	Toyota	DEX Imaging
22	Austin Cindric	Team Penske	Ford	Carshop
23	Blaine Perkins	Our Motorsports	Chevrolet	Raceline
26	Santino Ferrucci	Sam Hunt Racing	Toyota	The Moery Company, Manatawny Still Works
31	Josh Berry	Jordan Anderson Racing	Chevrolet	Bommarito Automotive Group
36	Alex Labbé	DGM Racing	Chevrolet	Can-Am
39	Ryan Sieg	RSS Racing	Ford	A-Game Energy "The Ultimate In Hydration"
44	Tommy Joe Martins	Martins Motorsports	Chevrolet	Diamond Gusset Jeans
47	Kyle Weatherman	Mike Harmon Racing	Chevrolet	AXE Crossbows
48	Jade Buford	Big Machine Racing Team	Chevrolet	Big Machine Vodka Spiked Cooler
51	Jeremy Clements	Jeremy Clements Racing	Chevrolet	Booze Pops
52	Joey Gase	Jimmy Means Racing	Chevrolet	Adirondack Tree Surgeons
54	Ty Gibbs	Joe Gibbs Racing	Toyota	Joe Gibbs Racing
61	Austin Hill	Hattori Racing Enterprises	Toyota	Toyota Tsusho
66	David Starr	MBM Motorsports	Toyota	Alarm Tech Systems
68	Brandon Brown	Brandonbilt Motorsports	Chevrolet	The Garrett Companies
74	Jesse Iwuji	Mike Harmon Racing	Chevrolet	eRacing Association, Gap 'Em
78	Jesse Little	B. J. McLeod Motorsports	Toyota	B. J. McLeod Motorsports
90	Loris Hezemans	DGM Racing	Chevrolet	Hezeburg Systems
92	Josh Williams	DGM Racing	Chevrolet	Sleep Well Sleep Disorder Specialists, Alloy Employer Services "Stronger by design"
98	Riley Herbst	Stewart-Haas Racing	Ford	Monster Energy
99	Mason Massey	B. J. McLeod Motorsports	Toyota	Gerber Collision & Glass
Official entry list

== Starting lineup ==
The starting lineup was determined by a formula based on the previous race. As a result, Harrison Burton of Joe Gibbs Racing won the pole.

The only driver not to qualify was Timmy Hill of MBM Motorsports.

Pos.	#	Driver	Team	Make
1	20	Harrison Burton	Joe Gibbs Racing	Toyota
2	7	Justin Allgaier	JR Motorsports	Chevrolet
3	16	A.J. Allmendinger	Kaulig Racing	Chevrolet
4	19	Brandon Jones	Joe Gibbs Racing	Toyota
5	10	Jeb Burton	Kaulig Racing	Chevrolet
6	18	Daniel Hemric	Joe Gibbs Racing	Toyota
7	9	Noah Gragson	JR Motorsports	Chevrolet
8	1	Michael Annett	JR Motorsports	Chevrolet
9	51	Jeremy Clements	Jeremy Clements Racing	Chevrolet
10	98	Riley Herbst	Stewart-Haas Racing	Ford
11	11	Justin Haley	Kaulig Racing	Chevrolet
12	39	Ryan Sieg	RSS Racing	Ford
13	22	Austin Cindric	Team Penske	Ford
14	54	Ty Gibbs	Joe Gibbs Racing	Toyota
15	61	Austin Hill	Hattori Racing Enterprises	Toyota
16	36	Alex Labbé	DGM Racing	Chevrolet
17	02	Brett Moffitt	Our Motorsports	Chevrolet
18	44	Tommy Joe Martins	Martins Motorsports	Chevrolet
19	2	Myatt Snider	Richard Childress Racing	Chevrolet
20	8	Sam Mayer	JR Motorsports	Chevrolet
21	6	Ryan Vargas	JD Motorsports	Chevrolet
22	92	Josh Williams	DGM Racing	Chevrolet
23	4	Landon Cassill	JD Motorsports	Chevrolet
24	68	Brandon Brown	Brandonbilt Motorsports	Chevrolet
25	66	David Starr	MBM Motorsports	Toyota
26	26	Santino Ferrucci	Sam Hunt Racing	Toyota
27	5	Matt Mills	B. J. McLeod Motorsports	Chevrolet
28	78	Jesse Little	B. J. McLeod Motorsports	Toyota
29	48	Jade Buford	Big Machine Racing Team	Chevrolet
30	47	Kyle Weatherman	Mike Harmon Racing	Chevrolet
31	23	Blaine Perkins	Our Motorsports	Chevrolet
32	17	Carson Ware	Rick Ware Racing	Chevrolet
33	31	Josh Berry	Jordan Anderson Racing	Chevrolet
34	74	Jesse Iwuji	Mike Harmon Racing	Chevrolet
35	07	Joe Graf, Jr.	SS-Green Light Racing	Chevrolet
36	99	Mason Massey	B. J. McLeod Motorsports	Toyota
37	15	Colby Howard	JD Motorsports	Chevrolet
38	0	Jeffrey Earnhardt	JD Motorsports	Chevrolet
39	90	Loris Hezemans	DGM Racing	Chevrolet
40	52	Joey Gase	Jimmy Means Racing	Chevrolet
Failed to qualify
41	13	Timmy Hill	MBM Motorsports	Toyota
Official starting lineup

== Race results ==
Stage 1 Laps: 20

Fin.	#	Driver	Team	Make	Pts
1	20	Harrison Burton	Joe Gibbs Racing	Toyota	10
2	18	Daniel Hemric	Joe Gibbs Racing	Toyota	9
3	7	Justin Allgaier	JR Motorsports	Chevrolet	8
4	22	Austin Cindric	Team Penske	Ford	7
5	16	A.J. Allmendinger	Kaulig Racing	Chevrolet	6
6	54	Ty Gibbs	Joe Gibbs Racing	Toyota	5
7	9	Noah Gragson	JR Motorsports	Chevrolet	4
8	10	Jeb Burton	Kaulig Racing	Chevrolet	3
9	11	Justin Haley	Kaulig Racing	Chevrolet	2
10	31	Josh Berry	Jordan Anderson Racing	Chevrolet	1

Stage 2 Laps: 20

Fin.	#	Driver	Team	Make	Pts
1	54	Ty Gibbs	Joe Gibbs Racing	Toyota	10
2	9	Noah Gragson	JR Motorsports	Chevrolet	9
3	19	Brandon Jones	Joe Gibbs Racing	Toyota	8
4	2	Myatt Snider	Richard Childress Racing	Chevrolet	7
5	98	Riley Herbst	Stewart-Haas Racing	Ford	6
6	22	Austin Cindric	Team Penske	Ford	5
7	10	Jeb Burton	Kaulig Racing	Chevrolet	4
8	16	A.J. Allmendinger	Kaulig Racing	Chevrolet	3
9	31	Josh Berry	Jordan Anderson Racing	Chevrolet	2
10	7	Justin Allgaier	JR Motorsports	Chevrolet	1

Stage 3 Laps: 50

Fin	St	#	Driver	Team	Make	Laps	Led	Status	Pts
1	13	22	Austin Cindric	Team Penske	Ford	90	26	running	52
2	14	54	Ty Gibbs	Joe Gibbs Racing	Toyota	90	11	running	50
3	2	7	Justin Allgaier	JR Motorsports	Chevrolet	90	10	running	43
4	7	9	Noah Gragson	JR Motorsports	Chevrolet	90	1	running	46
5	3	16	A.J. Allmendinger	Kaulig Racing	Chevrolet	90	0	running	41
6	6	18	Daniel Hemric	Joe Gibbs Racing	Toyota	90	18	running	40
7	4	19	Brandon Jones	Joe Gibbs Racing	Toyota	90	0	running	38
8	5	10	Jeb Burton	Kaulig Racing	Chevrolet	90	0	running	36
9	33	31	Josh Berry	Jordan Anderson Racing	Chevrolet	90	0	running	31
10	19	2	Myatt Snider	Richard Childress Racing	Chevrolet	90	0	running	34
11	17	02	Brett Moffitt	Our Motorsports	Chevrolet	90	0	running	26
12	8	1	Michael Annett	JR Motorsports	Chevrolet	90	0	running	25
13	9	51	Jeremy Clements	Jeremy Clements Racing	Chevrolet	90	2	running	24
14	26	26	Santino Ferrucci	Sam Hunt Racing	Toyota	90	0	running	23
15	24	68	Brandon Brown	Brandonbilt Motorsports	Chevrolet	90	0	running	22
16	16	36	Alex Labbé	DGM Racing	Chevrolet	90	1	running	21
17	12	39	Ryan Sieg	RSS Racing	Ford	90	0	running	20
18	20	8	Sam Mayer	JR Motorsports	Chevrolet	89	0	running	19
19	29	48	Jade Buford	Big Machine Racing Team	Chevrolet	89	0	running	18
20	18	44	Tommy Joe Martins	Martins Motorsports	Chevrolet	89	0	running	17
21	23	4	Landon Cassill	JD Motorsports	Chevrolet	89	0	running	16
22	38	0	Jeffrey Earnhardt	JD Motorsports	Chevrolet	89	0	running	15
23	27	5	Matt Mills	B. J. McLeod Motorsports	Chevrolet	89	0	running	14
24	37	15	Colby Howard	JD Motorsports	Chevrolet	89	0	running	13
25	15	61	Austin Hill	Hattori Racing Enterprises	Toyota	89	0	running	0
26	30	47	Kyle Weatherman	Mike Harmon Racing	Chevrolet	89	0	running	11
27	39	90	Loris Hezemans	DGM Racing	Chevrolet	89	0	running	10
28	32	17	Carson Ware	Rick Ware Racing	Chevrolet	88	0	running	9
29	28	78	Jesse Little	B. J. McLeod Motorsports	Toyota	88	0	running	8
30	36	99	Mason Massey	B. J. McLeod Motorsports	Toyota	88	0	running	7
31	34	74	Jesse Iwuji	Mike Harmon Racing	Chevrolet	88	0	running	0
32	35	07	Joe Graf, Jr.	SS-Green Light Racing	Chevrolet	88	0	running	5
33	25	66	David Starr	MBM Motorsports	Toyota	87	0	running	4
34	31	23	Blaine Perkins	Our Motorsports	Chevrolet	78	0	suspension	3
35	10	98	Riley Herbst	Stewart-Haas Racing	Ford	45	0	accident	8
36	40	52	Joey Gase	Jimmy Means Racing	Chevrolet	42	0	clutch	1
37	1	20	Harrison Burton	Joe Gibbs Racing	Toyota	36	21	accident	11
38	11	11	Justin Haley	Kaulig Racing	Chevrolet	24	0	accident	3
39	21	6	Ryan Vargas	JD Motorsports	Chevrolet	24	0	accident	1
40	22	92	Josh Williams	DGM Racing	Chevrolet	11	0	accident	1
Failed to qualify
41		13	Timmy Hill	MBM Motorsports	Toyota				
Official race results

Previous race: 2021 Tennessee Lottery 250	NASCAR Xfinity Series; 2021 season	Next race: 2021 Henry 180
