= Myatt Snider =

American racing driver (born 1994)

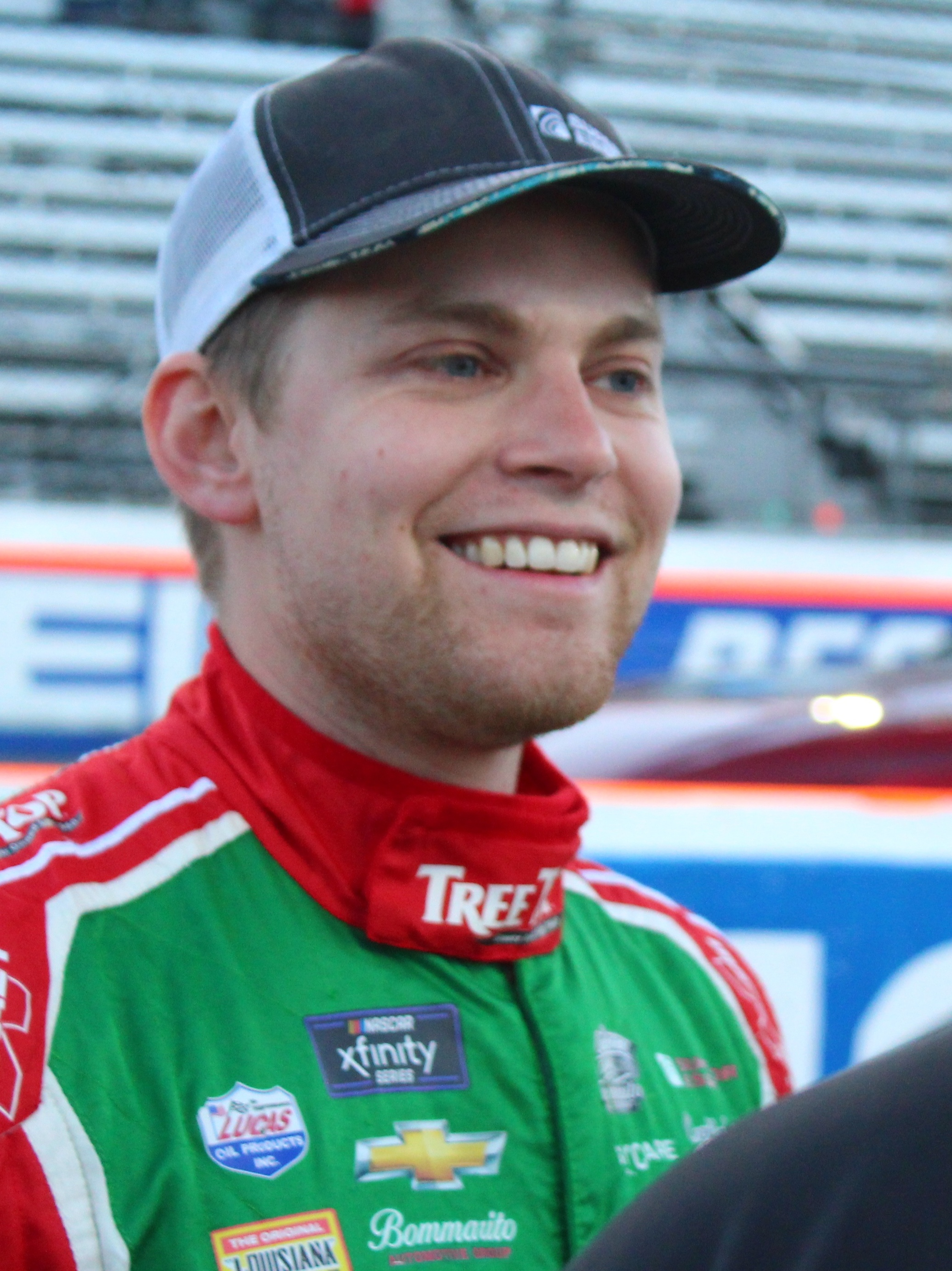
- Snider at Martinsville Speedway in 2024
- Born: Gurney Myatt Snider; December 30, 1994 (age 31); Charlotte, North Carolina, U.S.
- Achievements: 2017 U.S. Short Track Nationals Late Model Stock 100 Winner (inaugural race)
- Awards: 2018 NASCAR Camping World Truck Series Rookie of the Year; 2015 CARS Late Model Stock Tour Rookie of the Year

NASCAR O'Reilly Auto Parts Series career
- 118 races run over 7 years
- 2026 position: 40th
- Best finish: 9th (2021)
- First race: 2020 NASCAR Racing Experience 300 (Daytona)
- Last race: 2026 Blue Cross NC 300 (Charlotte)
- First win: 2021 Contender Boats 250 (Homestead)
| Wins | Top tens | Poles |
|---|---|---|
| 1 | 24 | 1 |

NASCAR FedEx Freight Truck Series career
- 36 races run over 5 years
- 2021 position: 110th
- Best finish: 9th (2018)
- First race: 2016 Lucas Oil 150 (Phoenix)
- Last race: 2021 Pinty's Truck Race on Dirt (Bristol Dirt)
| Wins | Top tens | Poles |
|---|---|---|
| 0 | 13 | 0 |

ARCA Menards Series career
- 11 races run over 3 years
- Best finish: 17th (2016)
- First race: 2016 Menards 200 (Toledo)
- Last race: 2019 VizCom 200 (Michigan)
- First win: 2016 Menards 200 (Toledo)
| Wins | Top tens | Poles |
|---|---|---|
| 1 | 7 | 0 |

NASCAR Whelen Euro Series career
- Debut season: 2019
- Starts: 13
- Wins: 0
- Poles: 2
- Fastest laps: 2
- Best finish: 6th in 2019
- Finished last season: 6th in 2019
- Statistics up to date as of November 7, 2026.

Gurney Myatt Snider (born December 30, 1994) is an American professional stock car racing driver. He last competed part-time in the NASCAR O'Reilly Auto Parts Series, driving the No. 30 Chevrolet Camaro SS for Barrett–Cope Racing, the No. 91 Chevrolet Camaro SS for DGM Racing with Jesse Iwuji Motorsports, and the No. 0 Chevrolet Camaro SS for SS-Green Light Racing with BRK Racing. He is the son of NASCAR on Prime Video, TNT and NBC pit reporter Marty Snider and also works as a pit spotter for NASCAR on Fox. He has previously competed in what is now the NASCAR Craftsman Truck Series as well as in the ARCA Menards Series, NASCAR Whelen Euro Series and CARS Tour.

== Racing career ==
=== ARCA Menards Series ===
Driving the No. 22 Cunningham Motorsports car on a part-time basis, Snider won his first start in the ARCA Racing Series, leading 35 laps en route to victory at Toledo Speedway in 2016. He also captured the pole at Michigan International Speedway and recorded two other top-five finishes in nine starts. In 2019, Snider joined with Venturini Motorsports for a one-off deal at Michigan.

=== Truck Series ===
Snider made his NASCAR national series debut in 2016, driving the No. 22 truck for AM Racing. He started nineteenth and finished on the lead lap in seventeenth. On December 23, 2016, it was announced that Snider would pilot the No. 51 Kyle Busch Motorsports truck for eight races in the 2017 season, including the season-opening NextEra Energy Resources 250 at Daytona International Speedway. Snider moved to ThorSport Racing to drive the team's No. 13 truck to drive full-time in 2018, replacing Cody Coughlin. He finished ninth in points and won Truck Series Rookie of the Year.

In 2019, Snider moved to ThorSport's No. 27 to drive part-time that year. Later in the season, he replaced Johnny Sauter in the team's No. 13 for the CarShield 200 at World Wide Technology Raceway at Gateway after Sauter was suspended.

Snider returned to the Truck Series in March 2021 for the Bristol Motor Speedway dirt race, driving the No. 33 for Reaume Brothers Racing.

=== Whelen Euro Series ===
On April 9, 2019, Snider announced he would compete full-time in the NASCAR Whelen Euro Series Elite 2 Division, driving the No. 48 Ford Mustang for Racing Engineering. Snider was originally spurred on by a chance to join fellow American Bobby Labonte's team, but that initial opportunity did not work out.

=== O'Reilly Auto Parts Series ===
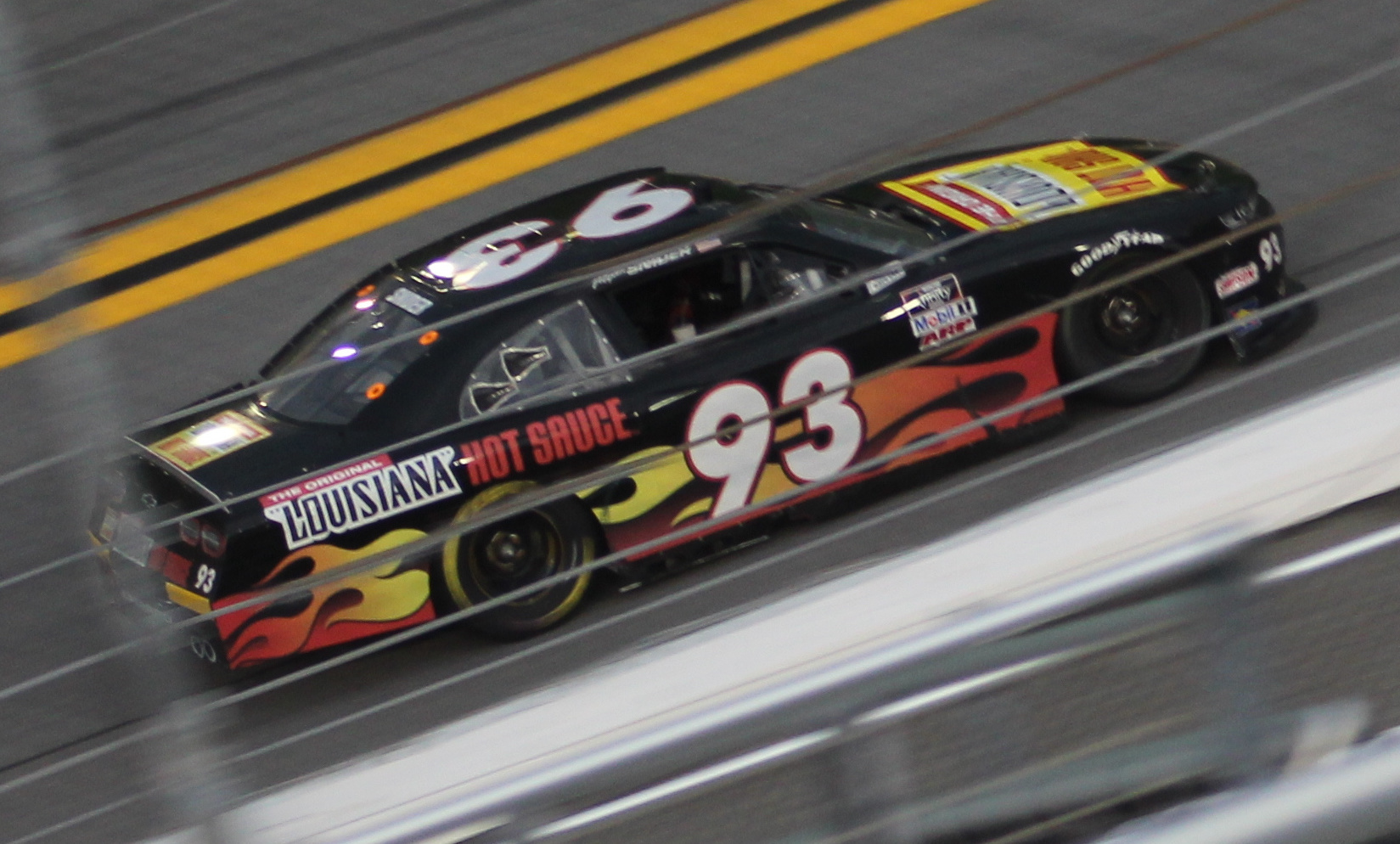
Snider in the No. 93 at Daytona International Speedway in 2020

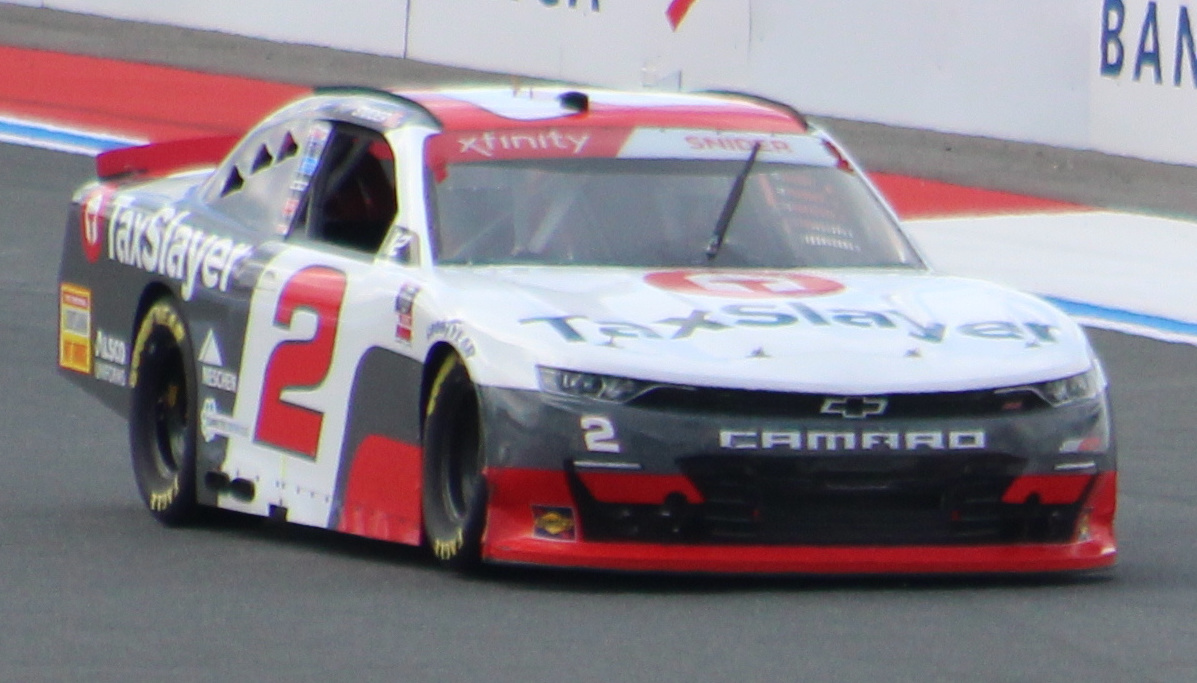
Snider in the No. 2 at Charlotte Motor Speedway in 2021

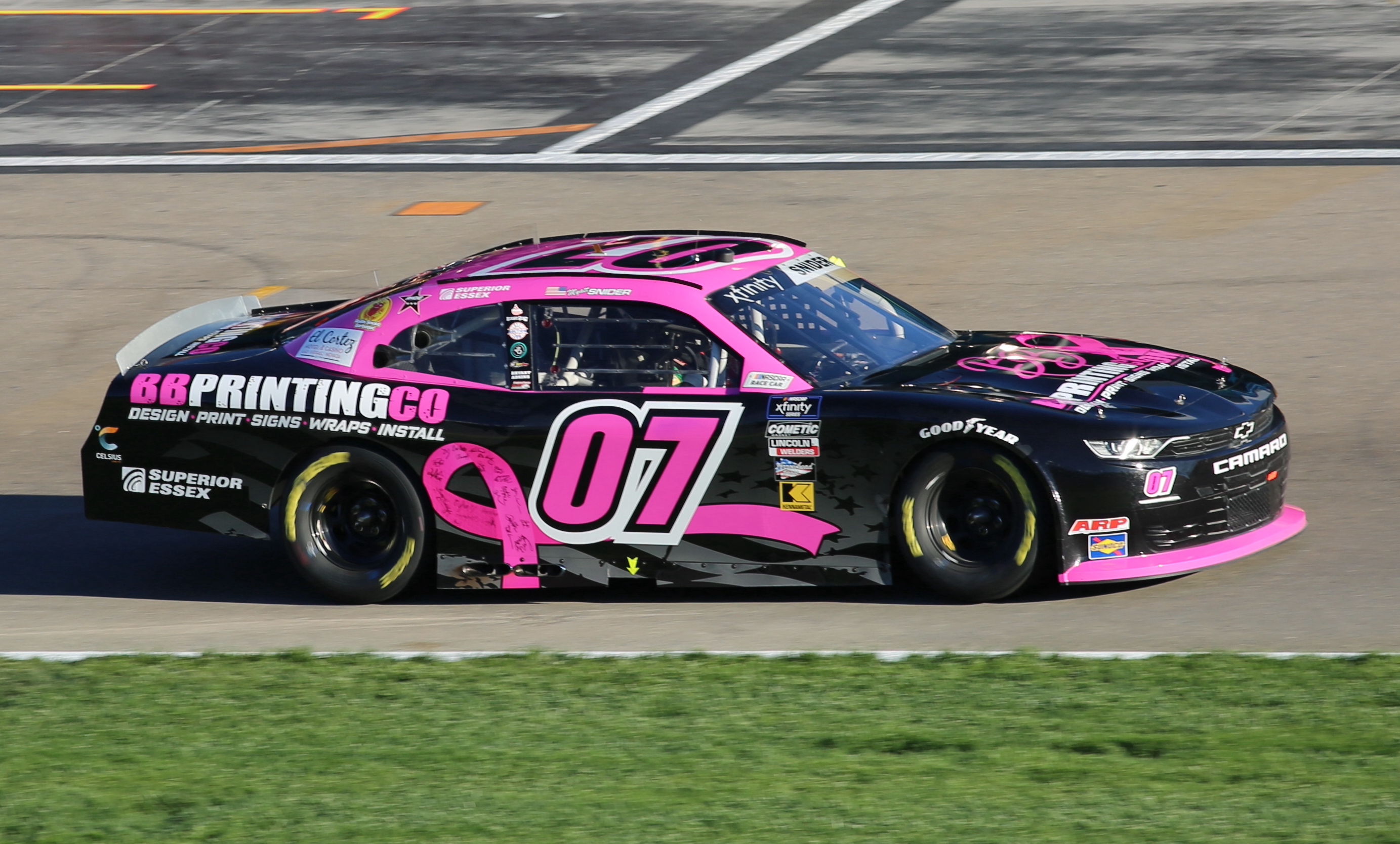
Snider's No. 07 car at Las Vegas Motor Speedway in 2024

On November 21, 2019, it was announced that Snider would drive select races for Richard Childress Racing in the NASCAR Xfinity Series in 2020, starting with the season opener at Daytona. His 2020 schedule was increased to 20 races in January when he joined RSS Racing on a limited basis.

In his series debut at Daytona, Snider won the pole and led 23 laps in the opening stage, but was involved in a crash shortly before the end of the second stage. After running the first eight races, Snider committed to a full-time 2020 schedule, contesting all but three races for RSS; he ran the Pocono Raceway, Martinsville Speedway, and Phoenix Raceway rounds with RCR.

Snider joined RCR's No. 2 for the full 2021 season. He would earn his first Xfinity Series win at Homestead-Miami Speedway on February 27, holding off RCR Cup driver and two-time champion Tyler Reddick in an overtime finish. The win qualified Snider for the playoffs. In the Round of 12's final race at the Charlotte Motor Speedway Roval, Snider was penalized for changing lanes too soon on a restart; although he rebounded to finish eighth, it was not enough to advance him to the next round, and he was eliminated.

Sheldon Creed was announced as the No. 2's driver for the 2022 season, though RCR and General Motors intended to keep Snider within their driver development program. On November 3, Jordan Anderson Racing signed Snider to drive the No. 31. On the last lap of the season opening 2022 Beef. It's What's for Dinner. 300, Snider was involved in a wild accident. He got turned by Anthony Alfredo, resulting in Snider's car going airborne and hitting the backstretch catchfence, destroying the car. He was seen moving around in the car and managed to get out and walk under his own power. He DNFed in 22nd place as a result. He finished second at Portland, his highest finish of the season. At Martinsville, Snider collided with Austin Hill during the closing laps. Following the race, Hill punched Snider in the face on pit road.

On February 8, 2023, it was announced that Snider would drive for Joe Gibbs Racing in select races for the 2023 season, starting with the season-opener at Daytona.

Snider's No. 91 car at Charlotte Motor Speedway in 2026.

Two weeks after his relief driving for Alex Bowman in the No. 48 Hendrick Motorsports car at Circuit of the Americas, Snider attempted to make his first start of 2026 in the renamed O'Reilly Auto Parts Series, at Las Vegas in March, driving the No. 30 car for Barrett–Cope Racing, but failed to qualify.

=== Cup Series ===
On March 1, 2026, Snider made his unofficial Cup Series debut mid-race at Austin when he relieved Alex Bowman in the Hendrick Motorsports No. 48 car after Bowman experienced heat exhaustion. Snider was at the track during the race working as a pit spotter for NASCAR on Fox reporter Jamie Little. He had brought a firesuit and helmet with him, so he was able to take Bowman's place and finish the race.

=== Other racing ===
In March 2019, Snider competed in the Michelin Pilot Challenge sports car race at Sebring International Raceway, driving a Ford for Multimatic Motorsports alongside ThorSport Racing teammates Matt Crafton, Grant Enfinger, and Ben Rhodes.

== Personal life ==
Myatt is the son of NASCAR pit reporter Marty Snider, who works for NASCAR on Prime Video, NASCAR on TNT and NASCAR on NBC. He attended UNC Charlotte, graduating in 2024 with a degree in mathematics, and also got a pilot's license in 2023.

After Snider lost his full-time ride in the Xfinity Series with Jordan Anderson Racing to Parker Retzlaff for 2023, Marty Snider encouraged his son to work on the TV side of NASCAR like him, and he became a pit spotter, assisting NASCAR pit reporters during broadcasts. He has worked with Kim Coon on The CW and NBC as well as Jamie Little in 2026 on NASCAR on Fox.

== Motorsports career results ==
=== Racing career summary ===
| Season | Series | Team | Races | Wins | Top 5 | Top 10 | Points | Position |
|---|---|---|---|---|---|---|---|---|
| 2015 | CARS Late Model Stock Car Tour | Marty Snider | 10 | 0 | 5 | 10 | 288 | **3rd** |
| 2016 | CARS Late Model Stock Car Tour | Marty Snider | 3 | 0 | 3 | 3 | 90 | 17th |
| 2016 | ARCA Racing Series | Cunningham Motorsports | 9 | 1 | 3 | 5 | 1475 | 17th |
| 2016 | NASCAR Camping World Truck Series | AM Racing | 1 | 0 | 0 | 0 | 16 | 60th |
| 2017 | CARS Late Model Stock Car Tour | Marty Snider | 7 | 1 | 1 | 4 | 171 | 13th |
| 2017 | ARCA Racing Series | Mason Mitchell Motorsports | 1 | 0 | 0 | 1 | 185 | 88th |
| 2017 | NASCAR Camping World Truck Series | Kyle Busch Motorsports | 8 | 0 | 1 | 3 | 227 | 22nd |
| 2018 | CARS Late Model Stock Car Tour | Vann Pierce | 1 | 0 | 1 | 1 | 32 | 38th |
| 2018 | NASCAR Camping World Truck Series | ThorSport Racing | 23 | 0 | 3 | 8 | 611 | 9th |
| 2019 | CARS Late Model Stock Car Tour | Marty Snider | 2 | 0 | 0 | 1 | 42 | 35th |
| 2019 | ARCA Menards Series | Venturini Motorsports | 1 | 0 | 0 | 1 | 190 | 62nd |
| 2019 | NASCAR Whelen Euro Series - Elite 2 | Racing Engineering | 13 | 0 | 4 | 11 | 458 | 6th |
| 2019 | NASCAR Gander Outdoors Truck Series | ThorSport Racing | 3 | 0 | 0 | 2 | 94 | 36th |
| 2020 | NASCAR Xfinity Series | Richard Childress Racing | 8 | 0 | 2 | 3 | 561 | 16th |
| 2020 | NASCAR Xfinity Series | RSS Racing | 25 | 0 | 0 | 3 | 561 | 16th |
| 2021 | NASCAR Camping World Truck Series | Reaume Brothers Racing | 1 | 0 | 0 | 0 | 0 | NC† |
| 2021 | NASCAR Xfinity Series | Richard Childress Racing | 33 | 1 | 1 | 11 | 2172 | 9th |
| 2022 | NASCAR Xfinity Series | Jordan Anderson Racing | 33 | 0 | 1 | 4 | 527 | 18th |
| 2023 | NASCAR Xfinity Series | Joe Gibbs Racing | 6 | 0 | 1 | 2 | 166 | 32nd |
| 2024 | NASCAR Xfinity Series | SS-Greenlight Racing | 2 | 0 | 0 | 0 | 59 | 47th |
| 2024 | NASCAR Xfinity Series | DGM Racing | 1 | 0 | 0 | 1 | 59 | 47th |
| 2025 | NASCAR Xfinity Series | DGM Racing with Jesse Iwuji Motorsports | 4 | 0 | 0 | 0 | 49 | 45th |
| 2026 | NASCAR O'Reilly Auto Parts Series | Barrett-Cope Racing | | | | | TBD | TBD |
| 2026 | NASCAR O'Reilly Auto Parts Series | DGM Racing with Jesse Iwuji Motorsports | | | | | TBD | TBD |

=== NASCAR ===
(key) (Bold – Pole position awarded by qualifying time. Italics – Pole position earned by points standings or practice time. * – Most laps led.)

==== Cup Series ====
NASCAR Cup Series results
| Year | Team | No. | Make | 1 | 2 | 3 | 4 | 5 | 6 | 7 | 8 | 9 | 10 | 11 | 12 | 13 | 14 | 15 | 16 | 17 | 18 | 19 | 20 | 21 | 22 | 23 | 24 | 25 | 26 | 27 | 28 | 29 | 30 | 31 | 32 | 33 | 34 | 35 | 36 | NCSC | Pts | Ref |
|---|---|---|---|---|---|---|---|---|---|---|---|---|---|---|---|---|---|---|---|---|---|---|---|---|---|---|---|---|---|---|---|---|---|---|---|---|---|---|---|---|---|---|
| 2026 | Hendrick Motorsports | 48 | Chevy | DAY | ATL | COA; RL^{†} | PHO | LVS | DAR | MAR | BRI | KAN | TAL | TEX | GLN | CLT | NSH | MCH | POC | COR | SON | CHI | ATL | NWS | IND | IOW | RCH | NHA | DAY | DAR | GTW | BRI | KAN | LVS | CLT | PHO | TAL | MAR | HOM | N/A | 0 | |
^{†} – Relieved Alex Bowman

==== O'Reilly Auto Parts Series ====
NASCAR O'Reilly Auto Parts Series results
| Year | Team | No. | Make | 1 | 2 | 3 | 4 | 5 | 6 | 7 | 8 | 9 | 10 | 11 | 12 | 13 | 14 | 15 | 16 | 17 | 18 | 19 | 20 | 21 | 22 | 23 | 24 | 25 | 26 | 27 | 28 | 29 | 30 | 31 | 32 | 33 | NOAPSC | Pts | Ref |
|---|---|---|---|---|---|---|---|---|---|---|---|---|---|---|---|---|---|---|---|---|---|---|---|---|---|---|---|---|---|---|---|---|---|---|---|---|---|---|---|
| 2020 | Richard Childress Racing | 21 | Chevy | **DAY**; 33 | LVS; 16 | | PHO; 14 | | CLT; 10 | BRI; 5 | | | | | POC; 4 | | | | | | | | | | | | | | | | | | | | MAR; 23 | PHO; 18 | 16th | 561 | |
| 2020 | RSS Racing | 93 | Chevy | | | CAL; 11 | | DAR; 35 | | | ATL; 29 | HOM; 15 | HOM; 7 | TAL; 27 | | IRC; 16 | KEN; 15 | KEN; 31 | TEX; 34 | KAN; 22 | ROA; 32 | DRC; 10 | DOV; 17 | DOV; 18 | DAY; 19 | DAR; 10 | RCH; 35 | RCH; 31 | BRI; 35 | LVS; 19 | TAL; 26 | ROV; 14 | KAN; 21 | TEX; 29 | | | 16th | 561 | |
| 2021 | Richard Childress Racing | 2 | Chevy | DAY; 7 | DRC; 13 | HOM; 1 | LVS; 32 | PHO; 11 | ATL; 11 | MAR; 15 | TAL; 9 | DAR; 19 | DOV; 16 | COA; 21 | CLT; 26 | MOH; 29 | TEX; 33 | NSH; 31 | POC; 10 | ROA; 23 | ATL; 21 | NHA; 7 | GLN; 15 | IRC; 7 | MCH; 36 | DAY; 8 | DAR; 9 | RCH; 25 | BRI; 8 | LVS; 15 | TAL; 31 | ROV; 8 | TEX; 21 | KAN; 10 | MAR; 13 | PHO; 19 | 9th | 2172 | |
| 2022 | Jordan Anderson Racing | 31 | Chevy | DAY; 22 | CAL; 26 | LVS; 21 | PHO; 24 | ATL; 30 | COA; 6 | RCH; 30 | MAR; 24 | TAL; 9 | DOV; 22 | DAR; 37 | TEX; 22 | CLT; 10 | PIR; 2 | NSH; 27 | ROA; 33 | ATL; 18 | NHA; 34 | POC; 14 | IRC; 33 | MCH; 17 | GLN; 33 | DAY; 12 | DAR; 28 | KAN; 19 | BRI; 22 | TEX; 20 | TAL; 35 | ROV; 13 | LVS; 19 | HOM; 22 | MAR; 14 | PHO; 25 | 18th | 527 | |
| 2023 | Joe Gibbs Racing | 19 | Toyota | DAY; 5 | CAL | LVS | PHO | ATL | COA | RCH | MAR | TAL | DOV | DAR | CLT | PIR; 6 | SON | NSH | CSC | ATL | NHA | POC | ROA | MCH | IRC | GLN | DAY | DAR | KAN | BRI | TEX | ROV; 14 | LVS; 11 | HOM | MAR; 15 | PHO; 22 | 32nd | 166 | |
| 2024 | SS-Green Light Racing | 07 | Chevy | DAY | ATL | LVS | PHO | COA | RCH | MAR; 19 | TEX | TAL | DOV | DAR | CLT | PIR | SON | IOW | NHA | NSH | CSC | POC | IND | MCH | DAY | DAR | ATL | GLN | BRI | KAN | TAL | ROV | LVS; 23 | HOM | | | 47th | 59 | |
| 2024 | DGM Racing | 91 | Chevy | | | | | | | | | | | | | | | | | | | | | | | | | | | | | | | | MAR; 10 | PHO | 47th | 59 | |
| 2025 | DGM Racing with Jesse Iwuji Motorsports | 91 | Chevy | DAY | ATL | COA | PHO | LVS | HOM; 30 | MAR; 33 | DAR | BRI | CAR | TAL | TEX | CLT | NSH; 22 | MXC | POC | ATL | CSC | SON | DOV | IND | IOW | GLN | DAY | PIR | GTW | BRI | KAN | ROV | LVS | TAL | MAR; 14 | PHO | 45th | 49 | |
| 2026 | Barrett–Cope Racing | 30 | Chevy | DAY | ATL | COA | PHO | LVS; DNQ | DAR; 33 | MAR; 19 | CAR | BRI | KAN | TAL | TEX | GLN | | | | | | | | | | | | | | | | | | | | | 40th | 73 | |
| 2026 | DGM Racing with Jesse Iwuji Motorsports | 91 | Chevy | | | | | | | | | | | | | | DOV; 24 | CLT | NSH | POC | COR | SON | CHI; 23 | ATL | IND | IOW | DAY | DAR | | | | CLT; 25 | PHO | TAL | MAR | HOM | 40th | 73 | |
| 2026 | SS-Green Light Racing with BRK Racing | 0 | Chevy | | | | | | | | | | | | | | | | | | | | | | | | | | GTW; 25 | BRI | LVS | | | | | | 40th | 73 | |

==== Camping World Truck Series ====
NASCAR Camping World Truck Series results
| Year | Team | No. | Make | 1 | 2 | 3 | 4 | 5 | 6 | 7 | 8 | 9 | 10 | 11 | 12 | 13 | 14 | 15 | 16 | 17 | 18 | 19 | 20 | 21 | 22 | 23 | NCWTC | Pts | Ref |
|---|---|---|---|---|---|---|---|---|---|---|---|---|---|---|---|---|---|---|---|---|---|---|---|---|---|---|---|---|---|
| 2016 | AM Racing | 22 | Toyota | DAY | ATL | MAR | KAN | DOV | CLT | TEX | IOW | GTW | KEN | ELD | POC | BRI | MCH | MSP | CHI | NHA | LVS | TAL | MAR | TEX | PHO; 17 | HOM | 60th | 16 | |
| 2017 | Kyle Busch Motorsports | 51 | Toyota | DAY; 10 | ATL | MAR | KAN | CLT | DOV | TEX; 16 | GTW | IOW | KEN; 16 | ELD | POC | MCH | BRI | MSP | CHI; 10 | NHA | LVS; 28 | TAL; 3 | MAR | TEX; 12 | PHO | HOM; 12 | 22nd | 227 | |
| 2018 | ThorSport Racing | 13 | Ford | DAY; 24 | ATL; 7 | LVS; 15 | MAR; 6 | DOV; 11 | KAN; 15 | CLT; 15 | TEX; 23 | IOW; 10 | GTW; 4 | CHI; 10 | KEN; 26 | ELD; 20 | POC; 12 | MCH; 18 | BRI; 29 | MSP; 19 | LVS; 6 | TAL; 2 | MAR; 3 | TEX; 13 | PHO; 22 | HOM; 14 | 9th | 611 | |
| 2019 | ThorSport Racing | 27 | Ford | DAY; 21 | ATL | LVS | MAR; 6 | TEX | DOV | KAN | CLT | TEX | IOW | | | | | | | | | | | | | | 36th | 94 | |
| 2019 | ThorSport Racing | 13 | Ford | | | | | | | | | | | GTW; 10 | CHI | KEN | POC | ELD | MCH | BRI | MSP | LVS | TAL | MAR | PHO | HOM | 36th | 94 | |
| 2021 | Reaume Brothers Racing | 33 | Chevy | DAY | DRC | LVS | ATL | BRD; 22 | RCH | KAN | DAR | COA | CLT | TEX | NSH | POC | KNX | GLN | GTW | DAR | BRI | LVS | TAL | MAR | PHO | | 110th | 0^{1} | |

^{*} Season still in progress
^{1} Ineligible for series points

==== Whelen Euro Series – Elite 2 ====
NASCAR Whelen Euro Series – Elite 2 results
| Year | Team | No. | Make | 1 | 2 | 3 | 4 | 5 | 6 | 7 | 8 | 9 | 10 | 11 | 12 | 13 | NWES | Pts | Ref |
|---|---|---|---|---|---|---|---|---|---|---|---|---|---|---|---|---|---|---|---|
| 2019 | Racing Engineering | 48 | Ford | **VAL**; 23 | **VAL**; 6 | FRA; 2 | FRA; 6 | BRH; 10 | BRH; 7 | MOS; 10 | MOS; 5 | VEN; 2 | HOC; 9 | HOC; 10 | ZOL; 19 | ZOL; 5 | 6th | 458 | |

=== ARCA Menards Series ===
(key) (Bold – Pole position awarded by qualifying time. Italics – Pole position earned by points standings or practice time. * – Most laps led.)

ARCA Menards Series results
| Year | Team | No. | Make | 1 | 2 | 3 | 4 | 5 | 6 | 7 | 8 | 9 | 10 | 11 | 12 | 13 | 14 | 15 | 16 | 17 | 18 | 19 | 20 | AMSC | Pts | Ref |
|---|---|---|---|---|---|---|---|---|---|---|---|---|---|---|---|---|---|---|---|---|---|---|---|---|---|---|
| 2016 | Cunningham Motorsports | 22 | Ford | DAY | NSH | SLM | TAL | TOL; 1 | NJE | POC; 9* | **MCH**; 23 | MAD | WIN | IOW; 5 | IRP; 3 | POC; 6 | BLN | ISF | DSF | SLM | CHI; 25 | KEN; 25 | KAN; 27 | 17th | 1475 | |
| 2017 | Mason Mitchell Motorsports | 78 | Chevy | DAY | NSH | SLM | TAL | TOL | ELK | POC | MCH | MAD | IOW | IRP | POC | WIN | ISF | ROA | DSF | SLM | CHI; 9 | KEN | KAN | 88th | 185 | |
| 2019 | Venturini Motorsports | 20 | Toyota | DAY | FIF | SLM | TAL | NSH | TOL | CLT | POC | MCH; 8 | MAD | GTW | CHI | ELK | IOW | POC | ISF | DSF | SLM | IRP | KAN | 62nd | 190 | |

=== CARS Late Model Stock Car Tour ===
(key) (Bold – Pole position awarded by qualifying time. Italics – Pole position earned by points standings or practice time. * – Most laps led. ** – All laps led.)

CARS Late Model Stock Car Tour results
| Year | Team | No. | Make | 1 | 2 | 3 | 4 | 5 | 6 | 7 | 8 | 9 | 10 | 11 | 12 | 13 | CLMSCTC | Pts | Ref |
|---|---|---|---|---|---|---|---|---|---|---|---|---|---|---|---|---|---|---|---|
| 2015 | Marty Snider | 2 | Chevy | SNM; 3 | ROU; 3 | HCY; 7 | SNM; 7 | TCM; 4 | MMS; 3 | ROU; 10 | **CON**; 2* | MYB; 7 | HCY; 10 | | | | 3rd | 288 | |
| 2016 | Marty Snider | 2 | Chevy | SNM; 4 | ROU; 4 | HCY | TCM | GRE | ROU | CON; 2 | MYB | HCY | SNM | | | | 17th | 90 | |
| 2017 | Marty Snider | 2 | Toyota | CON; 7 | **DOM**; 11* | DOM; 15 | HCY | HCY | **BRI**; 1* | AND | | | ROU; 10 | HCY | CON | SBO | 13th | 171 | |
| 2017 | Marty Snider | 2 | Chevy | | | | | | | | ROU; 9 | TCM; 12 | | | | | 13th | 171 | |
| 2018 | Vann Pierce | 25 | Ford | TCM | MYB | ROU | HCY | BRI; 3* | ACE | CCS | KPT | HCY | WKS | OCS | SBO | | 38th | 32 | |
| 2019 | Marty Snider | 25 | Ford | SNM; 9 | HCY | ROU; 15 | ACE | MMS | LGY | DOM | CCS | HCY | ROU | SBO | | | 35th | 42 | |
