= Sly Fox Brewery =

Brewer

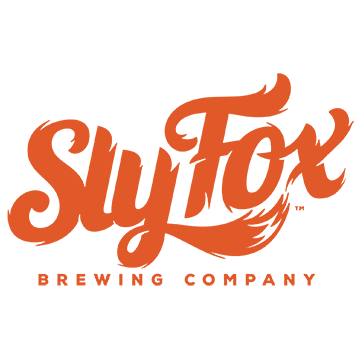
- Sly Fox Brewery
- Interactive map of Sly Fox Brewery
- Location: Phoenixville, PA, USA; Pottstown, PA, USA
- Opened: 1995 (Phoenixville); 2004 (Royersford); 2012 (Pottstown)
- Annual production volume: 22,000 US beer barrels (26,000 hL)
- Owner: Giannopoulos family

Active beers
Name	Type
Abbey Xtra	Abbey
Dunkel Lager	Dunkel
Helles Bock	Bock
Helles Golden Lager	Helles Lager
Instigator Doppelbock	Doppelbock
Ichor	Quadrupel
O'Reilly's Stout	Dry Stout
Panacea	Barleywine
Phoenix Pale Ale	American Pale Ale
Pikeland Pils	Pilsner
Royal Weisse	Wheat Beer
Rt. 113 IPA	IPA
Saison Vos	Saison
Seamus Irish Red Ale	Irish Red Ale

Other beers
Name	Type
Seasonal/Occasional beers
Abbey Dubbel	Dubbel
Black Raspberry Reserve	Fruit Beer
British Pale Ale	Pale Ale
Burns' Scottish Ale	Scottish Ale
Chester County Brown Ale	Brown Ale
Christmas Ale	Ale
Gang Aft Agley	Scotch Ale
Gold Rush Lager	Steam Lager
Jake's ESB	ESB
Maibock	Maibock
Oatmeal Stout	Sweet Stout
Odyssey Imperial IPA	Imperial IPA
Oktoberfest	Märzen
Prometheus	Smoked Porter
Rauchbier	Smoked Beer
Slacker Bock	Bock
Packaged beers
Black Raspberry Reserve	Fruit Beer
Christmas Ale	Ale
Dunkel Lager	Dunkel
Ichor	Quadrupel
Incubus	Tripel
Instigator Doppelbock	Doppelbock
Odyssey Imperial IPA	Imperial IPA
Oktoberfest	Märzen
Phoenix Pale Ale	American Pale Ale
Pikeland Pils	Pilsner
Royal Weisse	Wheat Beer
Rt. 113 IPA	IPA
Saison Vos	Saison

Sly Fox Brewery is a Pennsylvania brewery. The original Sly Fox Brewhouse & Eatery was founded by the Giannopoulos family at its original Phoenixville, Pennsylvania, location on December 20, 1995. The name of the establishment came out of a family meeting from the tradition of fox hunting in the Chester County area, where the first Sly Fox location resides.

Sly Fox opened a second location on November 8, 2004, in Royersford, Pennsylvania, right off Route 422, northwest of Philadelphia. The Phoenixville Brewhouse & Eatery moved "across the street" from the original location in 2010, which provided more space, parking and room for the annual Bock Fest and Goat Race.

Beer production capacity tripled in 2012 with the opening of the new brewery in Pottstown. The 30,000 sq. ft. brewery, situated on six acres at 331 Circle of Progress in the Pottstown Airport Business Center, is able to brew 50 hectoliters three times a day. A tasting room/pub has since been added.

== Awards ==
Awards for Sly Fox Brewery include:

- Sly Fox Amber IPA was voted Philadelphia Favorite Beer at a judging in the spring of 1996
- Sly Fox ESB won Gold medal as Best Bitter at the annual State College Microbrewers & Importers Exposition in 1998
- French Creek Helles won Bronze medal at the Great American Beer Festival in 2002
- Pikeland Pils won Bronze medal at the Great American Beer Festival in 2003
- Voted Third Best Brewpub in the country at BeerAdvocate.com in July 2003
- Named Philadelphia's Best Brewery by Philadelphia magazine in July 2004
- Pikeland Pils earned a top ranking in the April–May 2005 issue of Celebrator Beer News
- Rt. 113 IPA was named best India Pale Ale in the Mid-Atlantic/Southeast region at the 12th Annual Summer United States Beer Tasting Competition in 2006
- Pikeland Pils won Gold medal in the German-Style Pilsener category at the Great American Beer Festival in 2007
- Instigator Doppelbock won Bronze medal in the Strong Bock category at the Great American Beer Festival in 2007
- Saison Vos was named the best Saison in the Mid-Atlantic/Southeast region at the 13th Annual Summer United States Beer Tasting Competition in 2007
- Grisette won Silver Medal in the Belgian- and French-Style Ale category at the Great American Beer Festival in 2013
- Oktoberfest Lager won Bronze Medal in the Vienna-Style Lager category at the Great American Beer Festival in 2013

== Brewmasters ==
- John Giannopoulos 1994-20??
- Brady Van Duff 19??-19??
- Bob Waterman 19??-????
- Bill Moore 2000-2001
- Brian O’Reilly 2002–2018

Assisted by:

- Tim Ohst - Brewery Operations Manager
- Steve Jacoby
- Keith Barnaby

== Bottling and canning ==
Sly Fox growler

In addition to the traditional take-home growlers of beer, Sly Fox started bottling their beers in late 2005 and started canning in early 2006.

=== Beers in caged, corked 750ml bottles (ceased) ===
- Saison Vos
- Christmas Ale
- Ichor Quadruple
- Incubus Tripel
- Black Raspberry Reserve

=== Beers in 22oz bombers (ceased... certain beers are canned in 16 oz cans) ===
- Rt. 113 IPA
- Instigator Doppelbock
- Oktoberfest
- Odyssey Imperial IPA
- Gang Aft Agley Scotch Ale

=== Beers in 12oz cans ===
- Pikeland Pils
- Phoenix Pale Ale
- Dunkel Lager
- Royal Weisse
- Route 113 IPA
- Oktoberfest Lager
- Grisette
- SRT Ale

== Events ==
=== Incubus Friday ===
On the first Friday of every month, and only on the first Friday, a single keg of Incubus Tripel is tapped at noon at the Phoenixville location.

=== Firkin Fest ===
Started in Royersford in October 2005 but moved to Phoenixville in June 2006, a fresh firkin of a different cask conditioned Sly Fox beer is tapped on the bar on the third Friday of each month.

=== St. Patrick's Day Boot Camp ===
Dreamed up in 2003 by Corey Reid, the Phoenixville location's bar manager, the St. Patrick's Day Boot Camp is a nine- or ten-week program leading up to St. Patrick's Day that allows participants to earn raffle tickets for a drawing conducted on St. Patrick's Day. Starting in 2005, the grand prize is a trip for two to Ireland.

Each visit to Sly Fox earns the participant two raffle tickets and a stamp on their Boot Camp card, and participants can visit both locations. Starting in 2005, raffle tickets are given out on Wednesdays in Phoenixville and Thursdays in Royersford. After eight stamps, participants are given a Boot Camp T-shirt and ten additional raffle tickets.

=== Robbie Burns Birthday Bash ===
Sly Fox's Robbie Burns Birthday Bash, held in January at Phoenixville every year since 2003, honors Scotland's greatest poet. The event marks the release of Gang Aft Agley Scotch Ale and Burns' Scottish Ale and features readings of Burns' poetry by attendees, bagpipes, and a menu of Haggis and other Scottish treats.

=== Bock Beer Festival and Goat Race ===
Goat race held May 2006

An all-day event held annually in Pottstown, typically on the first Sunday in May, the Bock Beer Festival and Goat Race celebrates Bock-style beers and a traditional German menu. Originally the brain child of brewers David Sutula and Brian O'Reilly and launched in 1997 at the John Harvard's Brew House in Cleveland, Ohio. O'Reilly brought the idea with him to Sly Fox in 2002 after the Cleveland brewery closed. The event is held inside the pub and on the outside patio and parking area.

The event also features a multi-heat goat race competition in the adjacent parking lot. Owners run with the leashed animals but may not lead or pull them toward the finish line. The victorious goat earns the reward of having the brewery's annual Maibock named in its honor.

The 2005 event was greeted by sunshine, clear skies and spring temperatures, after a number of weeks where the area saw inclement weather. The good weather brought out an unexpected, record crowd of 1,000-plus people, a record 24 goats in the race, and the pub poured 13 barrels (403 gallons) of beer, putting a strain on the staff, supply of glasses, and restroom facilities. After learning some lessons in 2005, the festival in 2006 was greeted again by bright, warm sunshine and went smoother despite seeing nearly double the crowd from the previous year.

==== Previous winners ====
- 1996: Shakespeare (Original John Harvard's Festival)
- 2000: George
- 2001: Clover
- 2002: Ernie
- 2003: Nelly
- 2004: Weird Beard
- 2005: Savannah
- 2006: Han
- 2007: Sundae
- 2008: Jasper
- 2009: Dax
- 2010: Dax
- 2011: Peggy
- 2012: Peggy
- 2013: Simon
- 2014: Jixxer
- 2015: Penny
- 2016: Blue Hazel
- 2017: Blue Hazel
- 2018: Princess Jenny

==== 2014 Goat Race Winner Controversy ====
At the 2014 event, a close finish and an officiating mistake resulted the wrong goat being declared winner. Immediately after the race, entrant "Spartacus" was announced as the winner, and the 2014 Maibock was named "Spartacus" in his honor. Post-race video review revealed that the final was actually won by non-profit animal rescue Recycled Tails' entrant "Jixxer". Sly Fox released a statement apologizing for the error and announcing a special event and a beer named after Jixxer as restitution.

=== IPA Project ===
Started in 2004 as a year-long celebration of brewery's ninth year in business, Sly Fox created a series of eight varietal IPAs, each brewed with a single hop. All eight of the hops were used to brew Odyssey, Sly Fox's first Imperial IPA. The event culminated in an all-day festival at the Phoenixville location in December where the brewery's flagship Rt. 113 IPA, all eight varietal IPAs, and Odyssey were all available on tap.

In 2005, the IPA Project was repeated with nine varietal IPAs with nine new hops plus a reformulated Odyssey. The IPA Project celebration poured 12 different IPAs: Rt. 113 IPA, the nine varietals, and both the 2004 and 2005 Odyssey. The day-long event also marked the release of Rt. 113 IPA in 22oz bottles.

IPA Project 2006 repeated the best three single hop IPAs each from 2004 and 2005 and introduced four new ones, for a total of ten varietals. This year's day-long celebration in December was topped off with the first release of Odyssey Imperial IPA in 22oz bottles.

The 2007 version was hindered by a massive warehouse fire that occurred in October in Yakima, Washington, which destroyed roughly two million pounds of U.S. grown hops and has left several varieties in short supply or completely sold out for the year, but Brewery Operations Manager Tim Ohst announced that they planned on brewing eleven total varietals but in smaller batches. The IPA Project Day was held on December 14, 2007.

==== Hops used ====
- 2004: Amarillo, East Kent Golding, Centennial, Styrian Golding, Cascade, Target, Simcoe, Fuggle
- 2005: Glacier, Ahtanum, Northdown, Willamette, Progress, Galena, Challenger, Santiam, Chinook
- 2006: Cascade, Newport, Warrior, Northdown, Vanguard, Palisade, Simcoe, Nugget, Magnum, Challenger
- 2007: Galena, Phoenix, Amarillo, Nelson Sauvin, Chinook, First Gold, Centennial, Southern Cross, Target, Pacific Jade, Magnum

== See also ==
- Manatawny Still Works
