= 2020 Desert Diamond Casino West Valley 200 =

Race details
- Race 33 of 33 in the 2020 NASCAR Xfinity Series season
- Date: November 7, 2020
- Location: Phoenix Raceway in Avondale, Arizona
- Course: Permanent racing facility
- Course length: 1.00 miles (1.61 km)
- Distance: 200 laps, 200.000 mi (321.869 km)
- Average speed: 92.342 mph

Pole position
Driver	Justin Allgaier	JR Motorsports
- Grid positions set by competition-based formula

Most laps led
Driver	Justin Allgaier	JR Motorsports
- Laps: 76

Winner
No. 22	Austin Cindric	Team Penske

The 2020 Desert Diamond Casino West Valley 200 was a NASCAR Xfinity Series race held on November 7, 2020. It was contested over 200 laps on the 1-mile (1.6 km) oval. It was the thirty-third race and final race of the 2020 NASCAR Xfinity Series season. Team Penske driver Austin Cindric collected his sixth win of the season, and clinched the Xfinity Series championship.

== Report ==
=== Background ===
Phoenix Raceway, is a 1.022 mi (1.645 km), low-banked tri-oval race track located in Avondale, Arizona. The motorsport track opened in 1964 and currently hosts two NASCAR race weekends annually. PIR has also hosted the IndyCar Series, CART, USAC and the Rolex Sports Car Series. The raceway is currently owned and operated by International Speedway Corporation.

=== Entry list ===
- (R) denotes rookie driver.
- (i) denotes driver who is ineligible for series driver points.

No.	Driver	Team	Manufacturer
0	Jeffrey Earnhardt	JD Motorsports	Chevrolet
1	Michael Annett	JR Motorsports	Chevrolet
02	Brett Moffitt (i)	Our Motorsports	Chevrolet
4	Jesse Little (R)	JD Motorsports	Chevrolet
5	Matt Mills	B. J. McLeod Motorsports	Chevrolet
6	Ryan Vargas	JD Motorsports	Chevrolet
7	Justin Allgaier	JR Motorsports	Chevrolet
07	David Starr	SS-Green Light Racing	Chevrolet
8	Daniel Hemric	JR Motorsports	Chevrolet
08	Joe Graf Jr. (R)	SS-Green Light Racing	Chevrolet
9	Noah Gragson	JR Motorsports	Chevrolet
10	Ross Chastain	Kaulig Racing	Chevrolet
11	Justin Haley	Kaulig Racing	Chevrolet
13	Timmy Hill (i)	MBM Motorsports	Toyota
15	Colby Howard	JD Motorsports	Chevrolet
18	Riley Herbst (R)	Joe Gibbs Racing	Toyota
19	Brandon Jones	Joe Gibbs Racing	Toyota
20	Harrison Burton (R)	Joe Gibbs Racing	Toyota
21	Myatt Snider (R)	Richard Childress Racing	Chevrolet
22	Austin Cindric	Team Penske	Ford
26	Mason Diaz	Sam Hunt Racing	Toyota
36	Alex Labbé	DGM Racing	Chevrolet
39	Ryan Sieg	RSS Racing	Chevrolet
44	Tommy Joe Martins	Martins Motorsports	Chevrolet
47	Kyle Weatherman	Mike Harmon Racing	Chevrolet
51	Jeremy Clements	Jeremy Clements Racing	Chevrolet
52	Kody Vanderwal (R)	Means Racing	Chevrolet
61	J. J. Yeley (i)	Hattori Racing Enterprises	Toyota
66	Stan Mullis	MBM Motorsports	Toyota
68	Brandon Brown	Brandonbilt Motorsports	Chevrolet
74	Bayley Currey (i)	Mike Harmon Racing	Chevrolet
78	B. J. McLeod	B. J. McLeod Motorsports	Toyota
90	Donald Theetge	DGM Racing	Chevrolet
92	Josh Williams	DGM Racing	Chevrolet
93	C. J. McLaughlin	RSS Racing	Chevrolet
98	Chase Briscoe	Stewart-Haas Racing	Ford
99	Jesse Iwuji (i)	B. J. McLeod Motorsports	Chevrolet
Official entry list

== Qualifying ==
Justin Allgaier was awarded the pole based on competition based formula.

=== Qualifying results ===
Pos	No	Driver	Team	Manufacturer
1	7	Justin Allgaier	JR Motorsports	Chevrolet
2	98	Chase Briscoe	Stewart-Haas Racing	Ford
3	22	Austin Cindric	Team Penske	Ford
4	11	Justin Haley	Kaulig Racing	Chevrolet
5	20	Harrison Burton (R)	Joe Gibbs Racing	Toyota
6	9	Noah Gragson	JR Motorsports	Chevrolet
7	10	Ross Chastain	Kaulig Racing	Chevrolet
8	19	Brandon Jones	Joe Gibbs Racing	Toyota
9	18	Riley Herbst (R)	Joe Gibbs Racing	Toyota
10	1	Michael Annett	JR Motorsports	Chevrolet
11	39	Ryan Sieg	RSS Racing	Chevrolet
12	02	Brett Moffitt (i)	Our Motorsports	Chevrolet
13	51	Jeremy Clements	Jeremy Clements Racing	Chevrolet
14	68	Brandon Brown	Brandonbilt Motorsports	Chevrolet
15	21	Myatt Snider (R)	Richard Childress Racing	Chevrolet
16	92	Josh Williams	DGM Racing	Chevrolet
17	44	Tommy Joe Martins	Martins Motorsports	Chevrolet
18	8	Daniel Hemric	JR Motorsports	Chevrolet
19	13	Timmy Hill (i)	MBM Motorsports	Toyota
20	4	Jesse Little (R)	JD Motorsports	Chevrolet
21	36	Alex Labbé	DGM Racing	Chevrolet
22	0	Jeffrey Earnhardt	JD Motorsports	Chevrolet
23	08	Joe Graf Jr. (R)	SS-Green Light Racing	Chevrolet
24	26	Mason Diaz	Sam Hunt Racing	Toyota
25	15	Colby Howard	JD Motorsports	Chevrolet
26	90	Donald Theetge	DGM Racing	Chevrolet
27	78	B. J. McLeod	B. J. McLeod Motorsports	Chevrolet
28	6	Ryan Vargas	JD Motorsports	Chevrolet
29	07	David Starr	SS-Green Light Racing	Chevrolet
30	07	Gray Gaulding (i)	SS-Green Light Racing	Chevrolet
31	47	Kyle Weatherman	Mike Harmon Racing	Chevrolet
32	5	Matt Mills	B. J. McLeod Motorsports	Toyota
33	74	Bayley Currey (i)	Mike Harmon Racing	Chevrolet
34	61	J. J. Yeley (i)	Hattori Racing Enterprises	Toyota
35	93	C. J. McLaughlin	RSS Racing	Chevrolet
36	99	Jesse Iwuji (i)	B. J. McLeod Motorsports	Chevrolet
37	66	Stan Mullis	MBM Motorsports	Toyota
Official qualifying results

== Race ==
=== Race results ===
==== Stage Results ====
Stage One Laps: 45

Pos	No	Driver	Team	Manufacturer	Points
1	98	Chase Briscoe	Stewart-Haas Racing	Ford	10
2	22	Austin Cindric	Team Penske	Ford	9
3	7	Justin Allgaier	JR Motorsports	Chevrolet	8
4	9	Noah Gragson	JR Motorsports	Chevrolet	7
5	10	Ross Chastain	Kaulig Racing	Chevrolet	6
6	1	Michael Annett	JR Motorsports	Chevrolet	5
7	11	Justin Haley	Kaulig Racing	Chevrolet	4
8	20	Harrison Burton	Joe Gibbs Racing	Toyota	3
9	18	Riley Herbst (R)	Joe Gibbs Racing	Toyota	2
10	19	Brandon Jones	Joe Gibbs Racing	Toyota	1

Stage Two Laps: 45

Pos	No	Driver	Team	Manufacturer	Points
1	22	Austin Cindric	Team Penske	Ford	10
2	7	Justin Allgaier	JR Motorsports	Chevrolet	9
3	98	Chase Briscoe	Stewart-Haas Racing	Ford	8
4	19	Brandon Jones	Joe Gibbs Racing	Toyota	7
5	9	Noah Gragson	JR Motorsports	Chevrolet	6
6	1	Michael Annett	JR Motorsports	Chevrolet	5
7	11	Justin Haley	Kaulig Racing	Chevrolet	4
8	20	Harrison Burton	Joe Gibbs Racing	Toyota	3
9	51	Jeremy Clements	Jeremy Clements Racing	Chevrolet	2
10	21	Myatt Snider (R)	Richard Childress Racing	Chevrolet	1

=== Final Stage Results ===
Laps: 110

Pos	Grid	No	Driver	Team	Manufacturer	Laps	Points	Status
1	3	22	Austin Cindric	Team Penske	Ford	206	40	Running
2	6	9	Noah Gragson	JR Motorsports	Chevrolet	206	48	Running
3	8	19	Brandon Jones	Joe Gibbs Racing	Toyota	206	42	Running
4	10	1	Michael Annett	JR Motorsports	Chevrolet	206	43	Running
5	1	7	Justin Allgaier	JR Motorsports	Chevrolet	206	32	Running
6	5	20	Harrison Burton (R)	Joe Gibbs Racing	Toyota	206	37	Running
7	7	10	Ross Chastain	Kaulig Racing	Chevrolet	206	36	Running
8	4	11	Justin Haley	Kaulig Racing	Chevrolet	206	29	Running
9	2	98	Chase Briscoe	Stewart-Haas Racing	Ford	206	28	Running
10	13	51	Jeremy Clements	Jeremy Clements Racing	Chevrolet	206	29	Running
11	9	18	Riley Herbst (R)	Joe Gibbs Racing	Toyota	206	28	Running
12	14	68	Brandon Brown	Brandonbilt Motorsports	Chevrolet	205	25	Running
13	16	92	Josh Williams	DGM Racing	Chevrolet	205	24	Running
14	27	78	B. J. McLeod	B. J. McLeod Motorsports	Chevrolet	205	23	Running
15	33	74	Bayley Currey (i)	Mike Harmon Racing	Chevrolet	205	0	Running
16	29	07	David Starr	SS-Green Light Racing	Chevrolet	205	21	Running
17	31	47	Kyle Weatherman	Mike Harmon Racing	Chevrolet	205	20	Running
18	15	21	Myatt Snider (R)	Richard Childress Racing	Chevrolet	204	20	Running
19	12	02	Brett Moffitt	Our Motorsports	Chevrolet	204	0	Running
20	25	15	Colby Howard	JD Motorsports	Chevrolet	204	17	Running
21	12	36	Alex Labbé	DGM Racing	Chevrolet	203	16	Running
22	30	52	Kody Vanderwal (R)	Means Motorsports	Chevrolet	203	15	Running
23	19	13	Timmy Hill (i)	MBM Motorsports	Toyota	203	0	Running
24	24	26	Mason Diaz	Sam Hunt Racing	Toyota	202	13	Running
25	18	8	Daniel Hemric	JR Motorsports	Chevrolet	201	12	Running
26	34	61	J. J. Yeley (i)	Hattori Racing Enterprises	Toyota	200	0	Running
27	23	08	Joe Graf Jr. (R)	SS-Green Light Racing	Chevrolet	199	10	Running
28	37	66	Stan Mullis	MBM Motorsports	Toyota	198	9	Running
29	20	4	Jesse Little (R)	JD Motorsports	Chevrolet	198	8	Running
30	36	99	Jesse Iwuji (i)	B. J. McLeod Motorsports	Chevrolet	198	0	Running
31	11	39	Ryan Sieg	RSS Racing	Chevrolet	196	6	Running
32	22	0	Jeffrey Earnhardt	JD Motorsports	Chevrolet	185	5	Running
33	28	6	Ryan Vargas	JD Motorsports	Chevrolet	124	4	Running
34	17	44	Tommy Joe Martins	Martins Motorsports	Chevrolet	73	3	Engine
35	32	5	Matt Mills	B. J. McLeod Motorsports	Chevrolet	36	2	Accident
36	26	90	Donald Theetge	DGM Racing	Chevrolet	27	1	Accident
37	35	93	C. J. McLaughlin	RSS Racing	Chevrolet	27	1	Accident
Official race results

=== Race statistics ===
- Lead changes: 16 among 7 different drivers
- Cautions/Laps: 8 for 47
- Time of race: 2 hours, 13 minutes, and 51 seconds
- Average speed: 92.342 mph (148.610 km/h)

Previous race: 2020 Draft Top 250	NASCAR Xfinity Series; 2020 season	Next race: 2021 Beef. It's What's for Dinner. 300
