= Hattori Racing Enterprises =

NASCAR team

- Owner: Shigeaki Hattori
- Base: Mooresville, North Carolina
- Series: NASCAR Craftsman Truck Series; ARCA Menards Series; ARCA Menards Series West
- Manufacturer: Toyota
- Opened: 2008
- Closed: 2025

Career
- Debut: Xfinity Series: 2014 DRIVE4COPD 300 (Daytona); Truck Series: 2013 Michigan National Guard 200 (Michigan); ARCA Menards Series: 2008 Drive Smart! Buckle-Up Kentucky 150 (Kentucky); ARCA Menards Series East: 2010 South Boston 150 (South Boston); ARCA Menards Series West: 2023 General Tire 200 (Sonoma)
- Latest race: Xfinity Series: 2021 Andy's Frozen Custard 335 (Texas); Truck Series: 2024 Zip Buy Now, Pay Later 200 (Martinsville); ARCA Menards Series: 2024 General Tire 150 (Phoenix); ARCA Menards Series East: 2020 Bush's Beans 200 (Bristol); ARCA Menards Series West: 2024 General Tire 150 (Phoenix)
- Races competed: Total: 318; Xfinity Series: 25; Truck Series: 181; ARCA Menards Series: 22; ARCA Menards Series East: 88; ARCA Menards Series West: 2
- Drivers' Championships: Total: 1 Xfinity Series: 0 Truck Series: 1; 2018; ARCA Menards Series: 0 ARCA Menards Series East: 0 ARCA Menards Series West: 0
- Race victories: Total: 20; Xfinity Series: 0 Truck Series: 14; ARCA Menards Series: 1 ARCA Menards Series East: 5 ARCA Menards Series West: 0
- Pole positions: Total: 16; Xfinity Series: 0 Truck Series: 6 ARCA Menards Series: 1 ARCA Menards Series East: 9 ARCA Menards Series West: 0

Hattori Racing Enterprises (HRE) was a Japanese-American professional stock car racing team that competed in the NASCAR Craftsman Truck Series. Owned by former NASCAR and open-wheel driver Shigeaki Hattori, the team last competed part-time in the NASCAR Craftsman Truck Series with the No. 16 Toyota Tundra driven by multiple drivers, and part-time in the ARCA Menards Series and ARCA Menards Series West with Sean Hingorani driving the No. 61 Toyota Camry. The team previously competed in the NASCAR Xfinity Series and ARCA Menards Series East.

== History ==
=== Xfinity Series ===
==== Car No. 61 history ====
On May 30, 2019, it was reported that HRE would field the No. 61 Toyota at the July Daytona race, marking the team's first Xfinity race since 2015. On June 16, 2019, it was announced that the car would driven by Austin Hill, who was to make his Xfinity Series debut; however, a drive line failure prevented Hill from setting a qualifying time and he missed the race.

In August, HRE partnered with MBM Motorsports to renumber the latter's No. 42 to the No. 61 for the Food City 300 at Bristol. Timmy Hill drove the No. 61 to a career-best seventh.

The No. 61 AISIN Group Toyota attempted the race at Indianapolis with Austin Hill and scored a top ten in his first-ever Xfinity start as he finished ninth.

==== Car No. 61 results ====
Year	Driver	No.	Make	1	2	3	4	5	6	7	8	9	10	11	12	13	14	15	16	17	18	19	20	21	22	23	24	25	26	27	28	29	30	31	32	33	NXSC	Pts
2019	Austin Hill	61	Toyota	DAY	ATL	LVS	PHO	CAL	TEX	BRI	RCH	TAL	DOV	CLT	POC	MCH	IOW	CHI	DAY; DNQ	KEN	NHA	IOW	GLN	MOH	BRI	ROA	DAR	IND; 9	LVS	RCH	CLT	DOV	KAN	TEX	PHO	HOM	89th	0^{1}
2020	Austin Hill	61	Toyota	DAY; 35	LVS	CAL; 16	PHO	DAR	CLT; 33	BRI	ATL	HOM	HOM	TAL	POC	IND	KEN	KEN	TEX	KAN	ROA	DAY	DOV	DOV	DAY	DAR; 9	RCH	RCH	BRI	LVS; 17	TAL; 33	CLT; 36	KAN; 5	TEX; 33	MAR	PHO	78th	0^{1}
2021	Austin Hill	61	Toyota	DAY	DAY	HOM	LVS	PHO	ATL	MAR	TAL	DAR	DOV	COA	CLT	MOH	TEX	NSH; 9	POC; 25	ROA	ATL	NHA	GLN	IND; 29	MCH	DAY	DAR	RCH	BRI	LVS	TAL	CLT; 18	TEX; 20	KAN	MAR	PHO	86th	0^{1}

==== Car No. 80 history ====
Hattori made his NASCAR Xfinity Series debut with Johnny Sauter drove the No. 80 Toyota at the 2014 DRIVE4COPD 300 at Daytona. Sauter qualified ninth and finished twenty-eighth, one lap down. After that race, Hattori was quoted as saying "we have decided that we need to focus more on our Nationwide Series program”. Sauter would pilot Hattori's No. 80 Toyota for two more races, finishing 16th at Charlotte Motor Speedway and 15th at the Subway Firecracker 250 at Daytona. Starting at Michigan, Ross Chastain piloted the car for four races, turning in a best finish of tenth at Kentucky Speedway. Alex Bowman ran one race for Hattori, at Dover International Speedway.

One weekend after making his Truck debut for HRE, Ross Kenseth made his second Xfinity start and the only Xfinity start of 2015 for HRE. Kenseth started 29th, but he suffered from the limited resources at HRE and finished 33rd, 51 laps down.

The team did not attempt any Xfinity races from 2016, 2017, and 2018, as the team focused on strengthening their Truck Series program and fielding an entry in that series full-time.

==== Car No. 80 results ====
Year	Driver	No.	Make	1	2	3	4	5	6	7	8	9	10	11	12	13	14	15	16	17	18	19	20	21	22	23	24	25	26	27	28	29	30	31	32	33	NXSC	Pts
2014	Johnny Sauter	80	Toyota	DAY; 28	PHO	LVS	BRI	CAL	TEX	DAR	RCH	TAL	IOW	CLT; 16	DOV				DAY; 15	NHA	CHI	IND	IOW	GLN	MOH	BRI	ATL	RCH									102nd	0^{1}
2014	Ross Chastain	80	Toyota													MCH; 12	ROA	KEN											CHI; 19	KEN; 10			CLT; 21	TEX	PHO	HOM	102nd	0^{1}
2014	Alex Bowman	80	Toyota																												DOV; 19	KAN					102nd	0^{1}
2015	Ross Kenseth	80	Toyota	DAY	ATL	LVS	PHO	CAL	TEX	BRI	RCH	TAL	IOW	CLT	DOV	MCH	CHI	DAY	KEN	NHA	IND	IOW	GLN	MOH	BRI	ROA	DAR	RCH	CHI	KEN	DOV	CLT	KAN	TEX	PHO; 33	HOM	54th	50

=== Craftsman Truck Series ===
==== Truck No. 16 history ====
Part Time (2013)

Hattori made his major-series NASCAR debut at Michigan in 2013 with Brett Moffitt as the driver of the No. 16 Toyota. Moffitt started fourteenth and finished seventeenth, one lap off the pace. It would be HRE's only Truck start of the year.

Ryan Truex (2017)

In 2017, The team would bring the No. 16 full-time with Ryan Truex as the driver. Truex missed the playoffs in a tiebreaker with Ben Rhodes, but grabbed his first two career poles during the first round of the playoffs.

Brett Moffitt (2018)

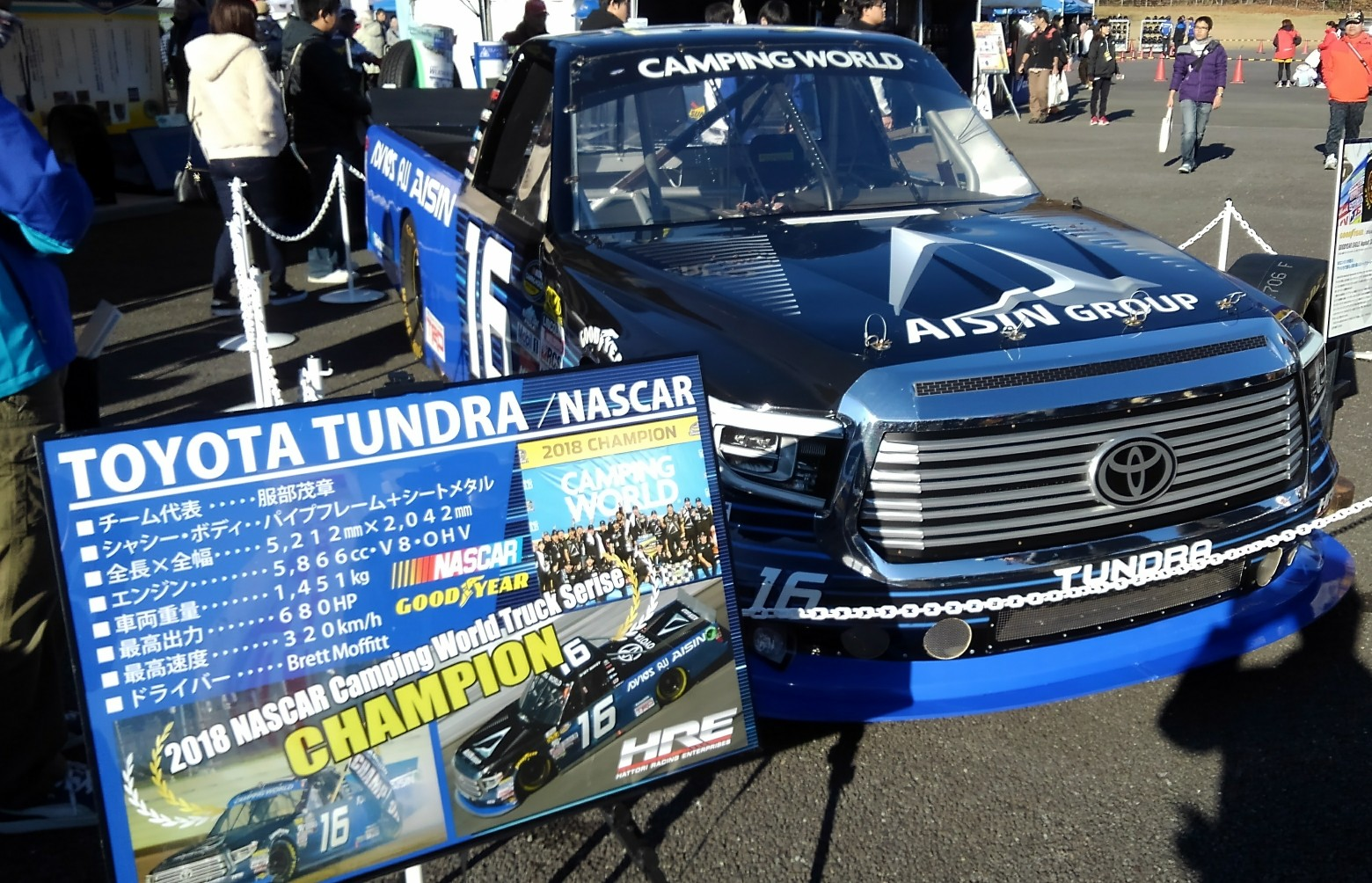
Brett Moffitt's championship-winning truck on display in 2018

The team would return full-time in 2018, with Brett Moffitt. In Atlanta (2018), Moffitt was able to get the team's first win in the Truck Series. Moffitt proceeded to win a total of six races on the season, including at Chicagoland where the team nearly wasn't able to race due to lack of sponsorship, to secure Hattori's first-ever NASCAR championship. With Moffitt's win at Phoenix in November, HRE's fifth ever in the truck series, and Moffitt's fifth on the season, the team became locked into the Championship 4 Round at Homestead-Miami Speedway. The next weekend, Moffitt held off Noah Gragson to win the team's first-ever championship.

Austin Hill (2019–2021)

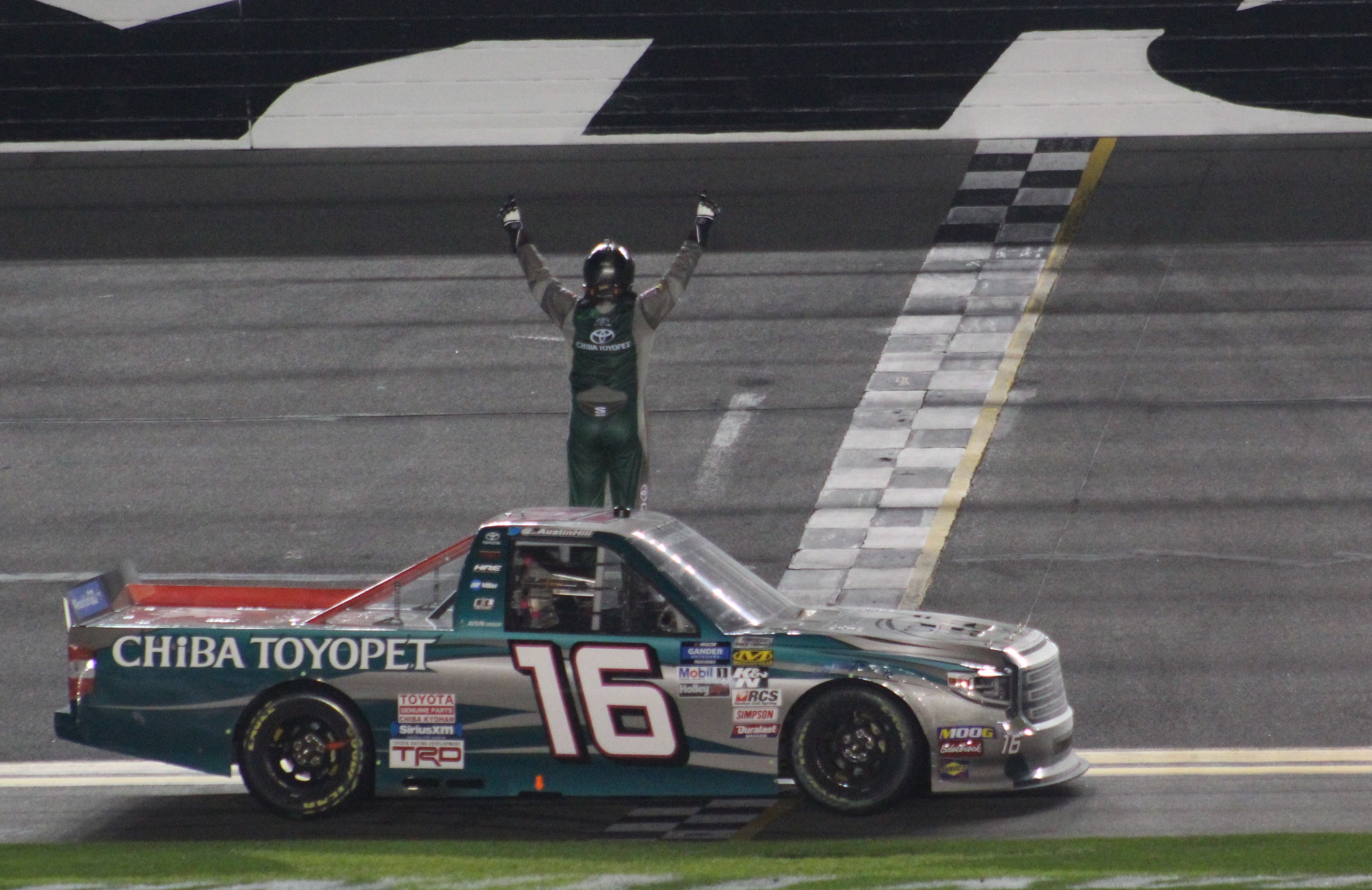
Austin Hill celebrating after winning the NextEra Energy 250 in 2019

On December 6, 2018, it was announced that Moffitt was released from the No. 16 team due to financial issues. The team plans to replace Moffitt with a driver who has sponsorship backing. On January 8, 2019, HRE announced that Austin Hill will drive the No. 16 in the 2019 season. Hill scored his record first win at the season-opening Daytona race. Following 2021, Austin Hill would move to the NASCAR Xfinity Series to drive the No. 21 for Richard Childress Racing.

Tyler Ankrum (2022–2023)

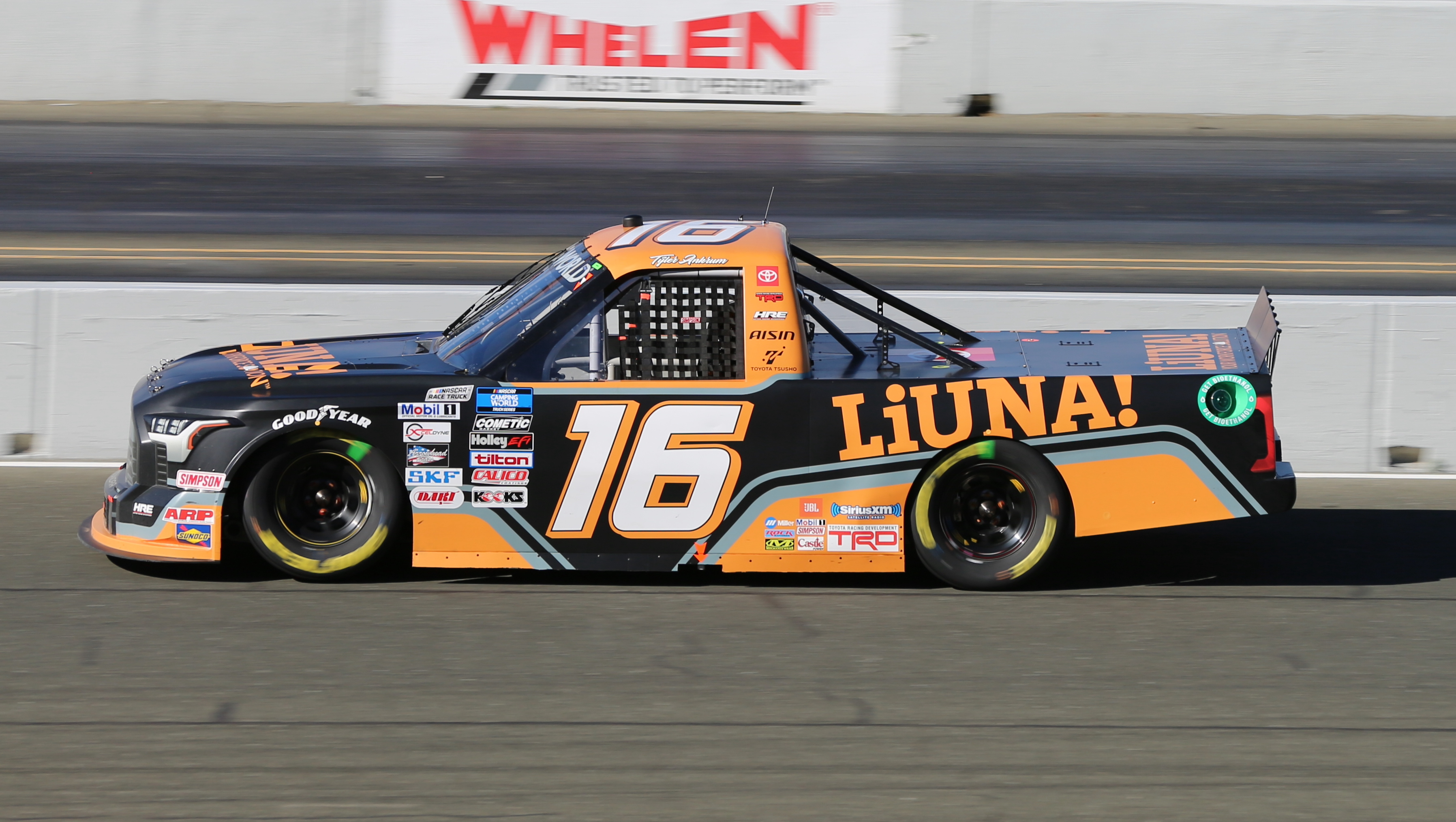
Tyler Ankrum in the No. 16 at Sonoma Raceway in 2022

Tyler Ankrum drove the No. 16 truck in 2022, getting only 8 Top 10s, 0 Top 5s and finished 12th in overall points with no wins. It was announced on January 13, 2023, that he would return to the team for the 2023 season. On December 7, 2023, it was announced that Ankrum would be leaving for McAnally–Hilgemann Racing for the 2024 season.

Part-time (2024)

In January 2024, The No. 16 truck owner points were bought by Reaume Brothers Racing. In February 2024, the team announced it would be scaling back to a part-time schedule. Hattori would make its first start of the season at North Wilkesboro, with the No. 16 being driven by Aric Almirola.

==== Truck No. 16 results ====
Year	Driver	No.	Make	1	2	3	4	5	6	7	8	9	10	11	12	13	14	15	16	17	18	19	20	21	22	23	Owners	Pts
2013	Brett Moffitt	16	Toyota	DAY	MAR	CAR	KAN	CLT	DOV	TEX	KEN	IOW	ELD	POC	MCH; 17	BRI	MSP	IOW	CHI	LVS	TAL	MAR	TEX	PHO	HOM		36th	57
2017	Ryan Truex	16	Toyota	DAY; 28	ATL; 13	MAR; 10	KAN; 6	CLT; 4	DOV; 10	TEX; 4	GTW; 7	IOW; 20	KEN; 23	ELD; 20	POC; 3	MCH; 4	BRI; 16	MSP; 5	CHI; 4	NHA; 2	LVS; 12	TAL; 28	MAR; 13	TEX; 8	PHO; 19	HOM; 4	11th	772
2018	Brett Moffitt	16	Toyota	DAY; 26	ATL; 1	LVS; 3	MAR; 3	DOV; 12	KAN; 16	CLT; 4	TEX; 18	IOW; 1*	GTW; 14	CHI; 1	KEN; 18	ELD; 5	POC; 26	MCH; 1	BRI; 18	MSP; 3	LVS; 11	TAL; 17	MAR; 2	TEX; 3	PHO; 1	HOM; 1*	1st	4040
2019	Austin Hill	16	Toyota	DAY; 1*	ATL; 7	LVS; 30	MAR; 16	TEX; 27	DOV; 7	KAN; 4	CLT; 6	TEX; 8	IOW; 12	GTW; 11	CHI; 5	KEN; 31	POC; 30	ELD; 32	MCH; 1*	BRI; 10	MSP; 5	LVS; 1	TAL; 6	MAR; 26	PHO; 13	HOM; 1*	5th	2298
2020	Austin Hill	16	Toyota	DAY; 6	LVS; 3	CLT; 9	ATL; 2	HOM; 7	POC; 2	KEN; 5	TEX; 30	KAN; 1*	KAN; 6	MCH; 12	DAY; 5	DOV; 8	GTW; 3	DAR; 3	RCH; 8	BRI; 25	LVS; 1	TAL; 19	KAN; 3	TEX; 2	MAR; 35	PHO; 12	7th	2242
2021	Austin Hill	16	Toyota	DAY; 22	DAY; 33	LVS; 3	ATL; 2	BRI; 9	RCH; 10	KAN; 3	DAR; 13	COA; 9	CLT; 9	TEX; 4	NSH; 9	POC; 5	KNX; 1	GLN; 1*	GTW; 23	DAR; 12	BRI; 24	LVS; 10	TAL; 32	MAR; 2	PHO; 10		7th	2210
2022	Tyler Ankrum	16	Toyota	DAY; 28	LVS; 16	ATL; 11	COA; 7	MAR; 10	BRI; 31	DAR; 9	KAN; 16	TEX; 33	CLT; 20	GTW; 15	SON; 9	KNX; 9	NSH; 7	MOH; 21	POC; 16	IRP; 6	RCH; 13	KAN; 14	BRI; 11	TAL; 10	HOM; 11	PHO; 14	14th	583
2023	Tyler Ankrum	16	Toyota	DAY; 7*	LVS; 15	ATL; 26	COA; 4	TEX; 26	BRD; 33	MAR; 27	KAN; 10	DAR; 15	NWS; 26	CLT; 28	GTW; 16	NSH; 8	MOH; 10	POC; 12	RCH; 13	IRP; 34	MLW; 20	KAN; 9	BRI; 23	TAL; 33	HOM; 25	PHO; 22	19th	456
2024	Aric Almirola	16	Toyota	DAY	ATL	LVS	BRI	COA	MAR	TEX	KAN	DAR	NWS; DNQ	CLT	GTW	NSH	POC										43rd	19
2024	Johnny Sauter	16	Toyota															IRP; 23	RCH	MLW	BRI	KAN	TAL; 34	HOM			43rd	19
2024	Landen Lewis	16	Toyota																						MAR; 35	PHO	43rd	19

==== Truck No. 18 history ====
Part-time (2015)

The team raced in the Xfinity Series for 2014 before returning to the trucks in 2015 with No. 18 Toyota. Ross Chastain, who raced for Hattori in 2014, returned to HRE to attempt to qualify at Michigan, but failed to qualify. Ross Kenseth, son of NASCAR Sprint Cup Series champion Matt Kenseth, made his first Truck series start with Hattori at Martinsville Speedway. Kenseth qualified 25th and finished 17th in the Aisin AW Toyota. Kenseth failed to qualify for the Truck series finale at Homestead-Miami Speedway.

==== Truck No. 18 results ====
Year	Driver	No.	Make	1	2	3	4	5	6	7	8	9	10	11	12	13	14	15	16	17	18	19	20	21	22	23	Owners	Pts
2015	Ross Chastain	18	Toyota	DAY	ATL	MAR	KAN	CLT	DOV	TEX	GTW	IOW	KEN	ELD	POC	MCH	BRI	MSP	CHI; DNQ	NHA	LVS	TAL					NA	0
2015	Ross Kenseth	18	Toyota																				MAR; 17	TEX	PHO	HOM; DNQ	NA	0

==== Truck No. 61 history ====
Beginnings (2021)

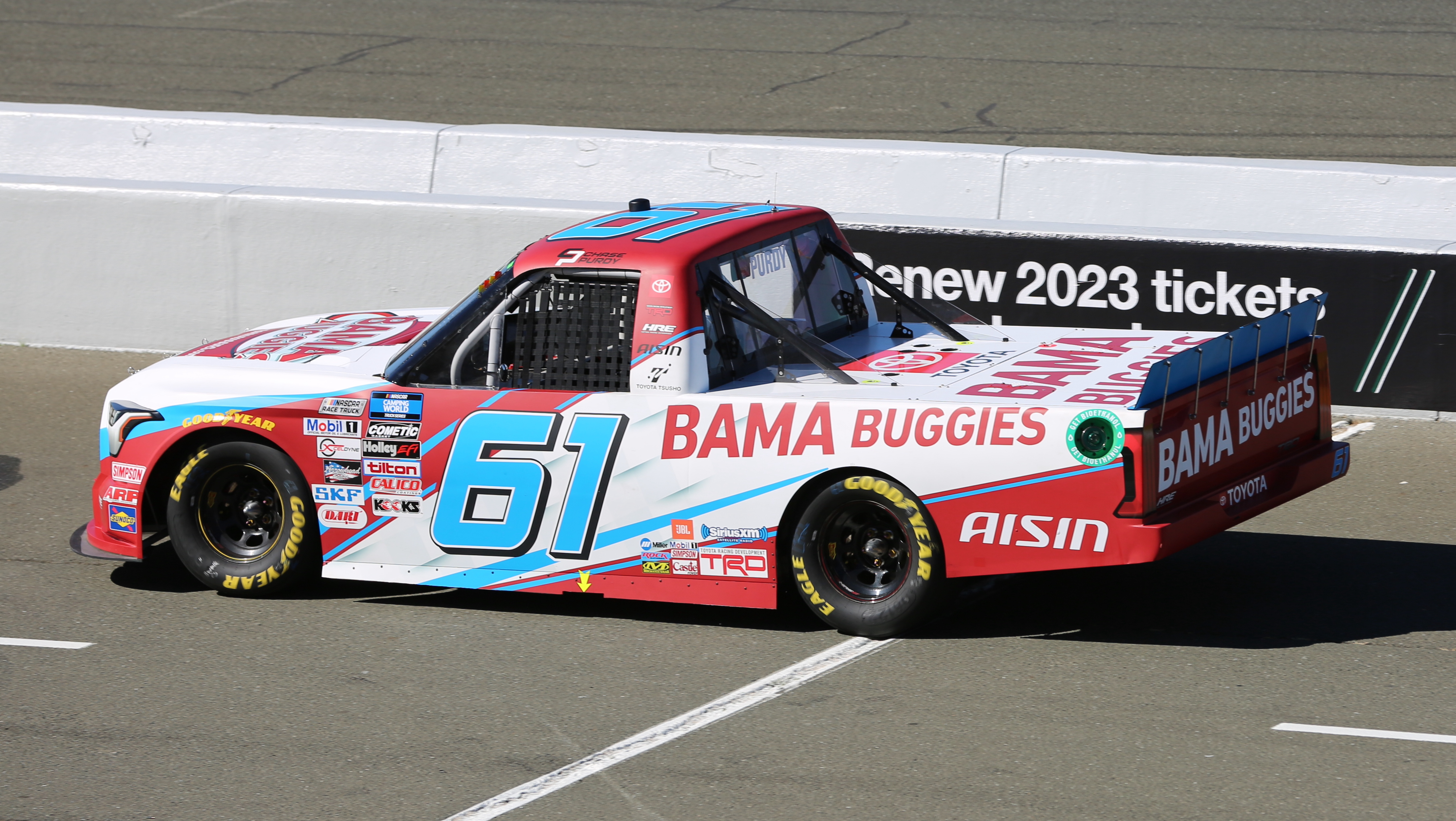
Chase Purdy in the No. 61 at Sonoma Raceway in 2022

For 2021, Max McLaughlin decided to put more focus on his dirt racing efforts and would therefore not run another full season in the East Series. However, he would remain with Hattori as he would return to the Truck Series to run a part-time schedule in a new second truck for the team, marking the first time Hattori has fielded a second team in the Truck Series. Ultimately, he never raced for Hattori.

Chase Purdy (2022)

On November 30, 2021, it was announced that Chase Purdy would drive this brand new No. 61 for 2022. On October 18, 2022, it was announced that Purdy will not return to the team for the 2023 season.

Part Time (2023)

On March 17, 2023, it was announced that Christopher Bell would drive the No. 61 at North Wilkesboro. Bell would return for the Pocono race as well. Jake Drew would run five races in the No. 61. His first race with them was at IRP and his best finish in the No. 61 was 10th at Kansas. On August 18, 2023, it was announced that Sean Hingorani would run the No. 61 at the Milwaukee Mile, finishing 23rd.

==== Truck No. 61 results ====
Year	Driver	No.	Make	1	2	3	4	5	6	7	8	9	10	11	12	13	14	15	16	17	18	19	20	21	22	23	Owners	Pts
2022	Chase Purdy	61	Toyota	DAY; DNQ	LVS; 14	ATL; 14	COA; 16	MAR; 29	BRI; 13	DAR; 35	KAN; 13	TEX; 21	CLT; 15	GTW; 10	SON; 15	KNX; 20	NSH; 13	MOH; 13	POC; 11	IRP; 27	RCH; 14	KAN; 25	BRI; 30	TAL; 7	HOM; 16	PHO; 19	17th	450
2023	Christopher Bell	61	Toyota	DAY	LVS	ATL	COA	TEX	BRI	MAR	KAN	DAR	NWS; 16	CLT	GTW	NSH	MOH	POC; 4	RCH								35th	165
2023	Jake Drew	61	Toyota																	IRP; 17		KAN; 10	BRI; 20	TAL; 20	HOM	PHO; 33	35th	165
2023	Sean Hingorani	61	Toyota																		MLW; 23						35th	165

==== Truck No. 81 history ====
Ryan Truex (2016)

In early 2016, it was announced that Mayetta, New Jersey's Ryan Truex would drive the No. 81 Toyota for the full season, contingent on sponsorship, according to Truex. Truex turned in a stellar run at the season-opening NextEra Energy Resources 250, finishing second. Truex may have won the race if not for NASCAR's "freeze-the-field" rule, which freezes the field when a caution comes out. Truex had lost support from Parker Kligerman, which allowed Johnny Sauter to win in his first race for GMS Racing. Truex did lead fourteen laps in the race. Truex would follow that up with a 20th at Atlanta Motor Speedway and a 12th at Martinsville. Funding fizzled out mid-season, and the team was forced to skip some races in the middle of the season. The team also switched crew chiefs, bringing in Wauters Motorsports owner Richie Wauters midseason. The No. 81 became the No. 16 at the end of 2016.

==== Truck No. 81 results ====
Year	Driver	No.	Make	1	2	3	4	5	6	7	8	9	10	11	12	13	14	15	16	17	18	19	20	21	22	23	Owners	Pts
2016	Ryan Truex	81	Toyota	DAY; 2	ATL; 20	MAR; 12	KAN; 6	DOV; 8	CLT; 22	TEX	IOW	GTW; 26	KEN	ELD	POC	BRI	MCH; 23	MSP; 21	CHI; 15	NHA; 16	LVS	TAL; 8	MAR; 14	TEX; 21	PHO	HOM; 32	18th	250

=== ARCA Menards Series ===
==== Car No. 01 history ====
HRE ran four drivers in the No. 01 in 2008, with Sean Caisse making five starts, Justin Marks making two, and Chrissy Wallace and Brent Glastetter making one start each. Caisse recorded two top-fives, a second and a fifth, and Marks recorded two top-tens, a seventh and an eighth. Michael Annett made HRE's only start in 2009, a 41st at Daytona after a crash.

==== Car No. 1 history ====
Max McLaughlin returned to the renamed ARCA Menards East Series in 2020 in Hattori's No. 1 car, but with the series having combination races with the East Series, McLaughlin and Hattori also competed in races in this series.

For 2021, McLaughlin decided to put more focus on his dirt racing efforts and would therefore not run another full season in the East Series.

==== Car No. 14 history ====
In 2011, HRE fielded the No. 14 for Matt Dibenedetto at Salem and Toledo, where he finished 6th and 12th respectively.

==== Car No. 17 history ====
In 2010, HRE fielded the No. 17 for Miguel Paludo at Kansas.

==== Car No. 61 history ====
In 2023, HRE fielded the No. 61 for Tyler Ankrum at Mid-Ohio, where he won the race.

=== ARCA Menards Series East ===
==== Car No. 01 history ====
In 2012, HRE fielded the No. 01 for Matt Dibenedetto at Iowa Speedway. He finished 20th.

In 2017, the No. 01 returned part-time. Jesse Little drove the car at Iowa. He finished 10th. Ryan Truex drove the car at Watkins Glen. He won the pole and finished 19th.

==== Car No. 1 history ====
In 2014, HRE fielded the No. 1 part-time for David Garbo Jr., Ross Chastain, and Trey Hutchens.

In 2015, HRE fielded the No. 1 part-time for Sergio Peña, Mason Mitchell, Jesse Little, and Brandon McReynolds.

In 2016, the No. 1 run full-time with Austin Theriault and Spencer Davis as the drivers.

In 2018, the No. 1 returned for part-time competition. Kyle Benjamin drove the car at Iowa. He finished 10th. Brett Moffitt drove the car at Watkins Glen International, where he won.

In 2019, dirt track racer Max McLaughlin signed with HRE to drive the No. 1 Camry with sponsorship from Textron Off Road and Mohawk Northeast Inc. McLaughlin would win at Watkins Glen in the same car Moffitt won with a year earlier.

For 2021, McLaughlin decided to put more focus on his dirt racing efforts and would therefore not run another full season in the East Series.

==== Car No. 11 history ====
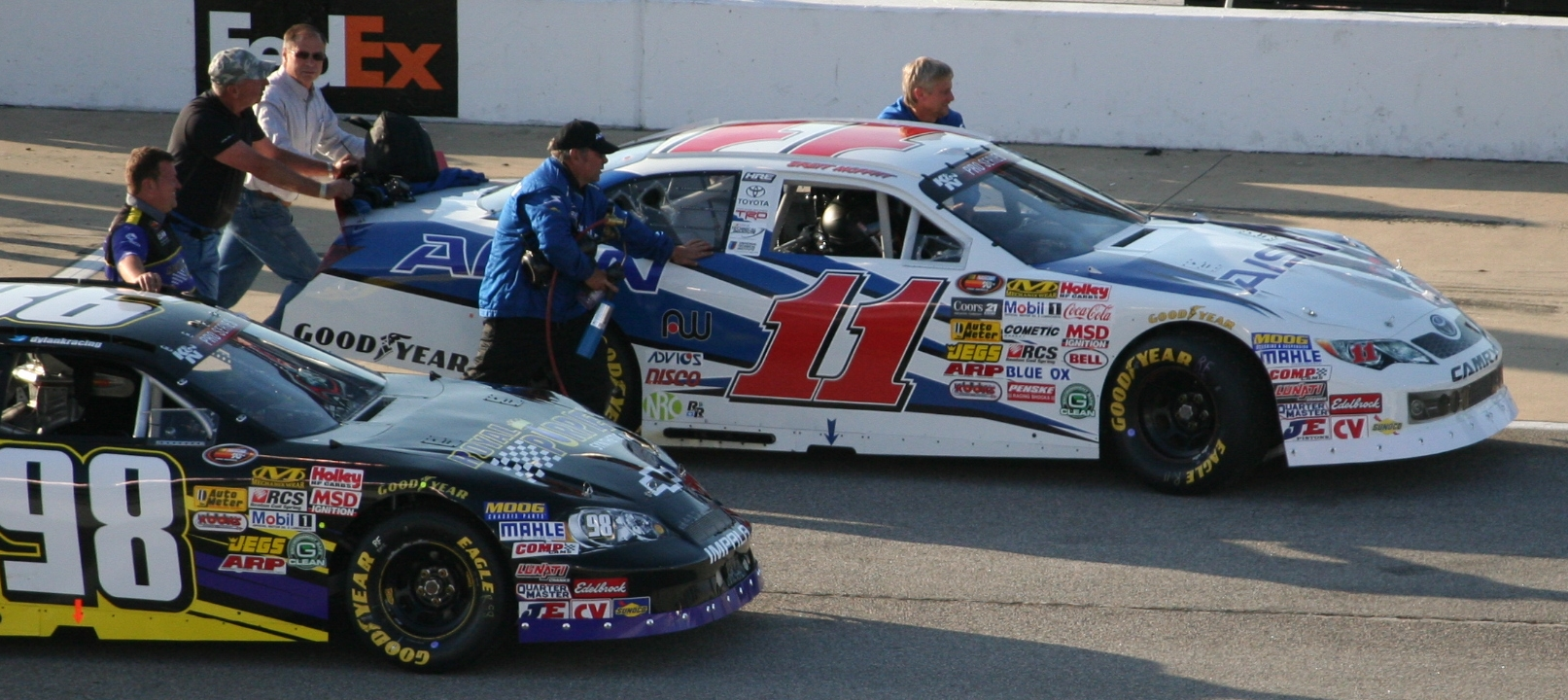
Brett Moffitt in 2013.

After competing in East Series for Joe Gibbs Racing in 2010 and Michael Waltrip in 2011, Brett Moffitt joined Hattori Racing in the No. 11 car and competed in the East Series in 2012 with two wins coming in that season. A crash on the final lap of the 2012 season at Rockingham knocked Brett out of the points lead surrendering the championship to Kyle Larson. Moffitt drove the full East Series Schedule again in 2013 without a win, but with a runner-up points finish.

In 2017, the No. 11 car returned part-time for Ryan Truex at Bristol. He finished 25th.

==== Car No. 77 history ====
In 2010, Hattori Racing fielded the No. 77 for Miguel Paludo. He finished fifteenth in the series standings that year, with a best finish of fourth.

=== ARCA Menards Series West ===
==== Car No. 81 history ====
In 2023, HRE fielded the No. 81 Toyota Camry for Sammy Smith at Sonoma. He finished 2nd.
