= 2021 Henry 180 =

Race details
- Race 17 of 33 of the 2021 NASCAR Xfinity Series
- Date: July 3, 2021
- Location: Elkhart Lake, Wisconsin, Road America
- Course: Permanent racing facility
- Course length: 4.048 miles (6.515 km)
- Distance: 45 laps, 182.16 mi (293.158 km)
- Average speed: 74.972 miles per hour (120.656 km/h)

Pole position
Driver	Ty Gibbs	Joe Gibbs Racing
- Time: 135.520

Most laps led
Driver	A. J. Allmendinger	Kaulig Racing
- Laps: 12

Winner
No. 54	Kyle Busch	Joe Gibbs Racing

Television in the United States
- Network: NBC
- Announcers: Rick Allen, Dale Earnhardt Jr., Jeff Burton, Steve Letarte

The 2021 Henry 180 was the 17th stock car race of the 2021 NASCAR Xfinity Series season, and the 12th iteration of the event. The race was held on Saturday, July 3, 2021 at Elkhart Lake, Wisconsin in Road America, a 4.048 miles (6.515 km) permanent road course. The race took 45 laps to complete. After suffering damage, Kyle Busch of Joe Gibbs Racing would rally back to the front and would win his 101st career NASCAR Xfinity Series race and his fourth of the season. To fill out the podium positions, Daniel Hemric of Joe Gibbs Racing and Michael Annett of JR Motorsports would finish 2nd and 3rd, respectively.

The layout of Road America, the venue where the race was held.

== Background ==
Entry list
#	Driver	Team	Make	Sponsor
0	Jeffrey Earnhardt	JD Motorsports	Chevrolet	ForeverLawn Premium Synthetic Grass
1	Michael Annett	JR Motorsports	Chevrolet	Allstate Peterbilt Group Celebrating 50 Years
2	Myatt Snider	Richard Childress Racing	Chevrolet	Shore Lunch Soup & Breading Mixes
02	Brett Moffitt	Our Motorsports	Chevrolet	Our Motorsports
4	Landon Cassill	JD Motorsports	Chevrolet	Voyager
5	Andy Lally	B. J. McLeod Motorsports	Toyota	Alpha Prime Regimen Geoff Bodine Throwback
6	Spencer Pumpelly	JD Motorsports	Chevrolet	Rice Tire "Experts In Tire Solutions"
7	Justin Allgaier	JR Motorsports	Chevrolet	Brandt Professional Agriculture
07	Josh Bilicki	SS-Green Light Racing with Rick Ware Racing	Chevrolet	Insurance King Patriotic, Ditec Marine Cleaning Products
8	Sam Mayer (R)	JR Motorsports	Chevrolet	QPS Employment Group
9	Noah Gragson	JR Motorsports	Chevrolet	Bass Pro Shops, Black Rifle Coffee Company
10	Jeb Burton	Kaulig Racing	Chevrolet	Nutrien Ag Solutions
11	Justin Haley	Kaulig Racing	Chevrolet	LeafFilter Gutter Protection
13	Stephen Leicht	MBM Motorsports	Toyota	Jani-King "The King of Clean"
15	Colby Howard	JD Motorsports	Chevrolet	Project Hope Foundation
16	A. J. Allmendinger	Kaulig Racing	Chevrolet	HyperIce
17	Cody Ware	SS-Green Light Racing with Rick Ware Racing	Ford	Nurtec ODT
18	Daniel Hemric	Joe Gibbs Racing	Toyota	Poppy Bank
19	Brandon Jones	Joe Gibbs Racing	Toyota	Toyota
20	Harrison Burton	Joe Gibbs Racing	Toyota	DEX Imaging
22	Austin Cindric	Team Penske	Ford	Menards, Richmond Water Heaters
23	Natalie Decker	Our Motorsports	Chevrolet	Nerd Focus, N29 Capital Partners, LLC
26	Kris Wright (i)	Sam Hunt Racing	Toyota	Wright Automotive Group "God Bless America"
31	Kaz Grala (i)	Jordan Anderson Racing	Chevrolet	Bommarito Automotive Group, Ruedebusch.com
36	Alex Labbé	DGM Racing	Chevrolet	Can-Am
39	Ryan Sieg	RSS Racing	Ford	CMR Construction & Roofing
42	Timmy Hill (i)	MBM Motorsports	Toyota	Kunes RV
44	Tommy Joe Martins	Martins Motorsports	Chevrolet	Gilreath Farms Black Angus "The New Black"
47	Kyle Weatherman	Mike Harmon Racing	Chevrolet	AXE Crossbows
48	Jade Buford (R)	Big Machine Racing Team	Chevrolet	Big Machine Vodka Spiked Cooler
51	Jeremy Clements	Jeremy Clements Racing	Chevrolet	Whitetail Smokeless Patriotic
52	Gray Gaulding	Jimmy Means Racing	Chevrolet	Jimmy Means Racing
54	Kyle Busch (i)	Joe Gibbs Racing	Toyota	M&M's Ice Cream
61	Boris Said	Hattori Racing Enterprises	Toyota	Kunes RV
66	Matt Jaskol	MBM Motorsports	Toyota	Auto Parts 4 Less
68	Brandon Brown	Brandonbilt Motorsports	Chevrolet	Sim Seats
74	Bayley Currey (i)	Mike Harmon Racing	Chevrolet	Belmont Classic Cars
78	Ryan Ellis	B. J. McLeod Motorsports	Toyota	Rich Mar Florist, Circle B Diecast, Limetree
81	Ty Gibbs (R)	Joe Gibbs Racing	Toyota	Monster Energy
90	Preston Pardus	DGM Racing	Chevrolet	Chinchor Electric, Inc.
92	Josh Williams	DGM Racing	Chevrolet	Alloy Employer Services "Stronger by design"
98	Riley Herbst	Stewart-Haas Racing	Ford	Monster Energy
99	Kevin Harvick (i)	B. J. McLeod Motorsports	Ford	Henry Repeating Arms
Official entry list

== Practice ==
The first and final practice took place on Friday, July 2. Austin Cindric would set the fastest time in the session with a 2 minute and 15.096 second lap.

Pos.	#	Driver	Team	Make	Time	Speed
1	22	Austin Cindric	Team Penske	Ford	2:15:096	107.870
2	10	Jeb Burton	Kaulig Racing	Chevrolet	2:16:084	107.087
3	7	Justin Allgaier	JR Motorsports	Chevrolet	2:16:170	107.019
Full practice results

== Qualifying ==
Qualifying would take place on Saturday, July 3, at 12:23 EST. Ty Gibbs would win the pole with a 2 minute and 15.520 second lap.

7 drivers would fail to qualify: the #66 of Matt Jaskol, the #52 of Gray Gaulding, the #0 of Jeffrey Earnhardt, the #15 of Colby Howard, the #61 of Boris Said, the #47 of Kyle Weatherman, and the #74 of Bayley Currey.

Pos.	#	Driver	Team	Make	Time	Speed
1	81	Ty Gibbs	Joe Gibbs Racing	Toyota	2:15.520	107.532
2	22	Austin Cindric	Team Penske	Ford	2:15.592	107.475
3	16	A.J. Allmendinger	Kaulig Racing	Chevrolet	2:15.725	107.370
4	18	Daniel Hemric	Joe Gibbs Racing	Toyota	2:15.915	107.220
5	54	Kyle Busch	Joe Gibbs Racing	Toyota	2:16.392	106.845
6	7	Justin Allgaier	JR Motorsports	Chevrolet	2:16.729	106.582
7	31	Kaz Grala	Jordan Anderson Racing	Chevrolet	2:16.817	106.513
8	10	Jeb Burton	Kaulig Racing	Chevrolet	2:16.846	106.491
9	51	Jeremy Clements	Jeremy Clements Racing	Chevrolet	2:17.184	106.228
10	20	Harrison Burton	Joe Gibbs Racing	Toyota	2:18.192	105.453
11	48	Jade Buford	Big Machine Racing Team	Chevrolet	2:19.351	104.576
12	1	Michael Annett	JR Motorsports	Chevrolet	0.000	0.000
Eliminated in the first round
13	11	Justin Haley	Kaulig Racing	Chevrolet	2:16.724	106.586
14	07	Josh Bilicki	SS-Green Light Racing with Rick Ware Racing	Chevrolet	2:16.801	106.526
15	5	Andy Lally	B. J. McLeod Motorsports	Toyota	2:16.870	106.472
16	90	Preston Pardus	DGM Racing	Chevrolet	2:16.885	106.460
17	17	Cody Ware	SS-Green Light Racing with Rick Ware Racing	Ford	2:16.983	106.384
18	6	Spencer Pumpelly	JD Motorsports	Chevrolet	2:17.023	106.353
19	68	Brandon Brown	Brandonbilt Motorsports	Chevrolet	2:17.120	106.278
20	99	Kevin Harvick	B. J. McLeod Motorsports	Ford	2:17.178	106.233
21	19	Brandon Jones	Joe Gibbs Racing	Toyota	2:17.452	106.021
22	36	Alex Labbé	DGM Racing	Chevrolet	2:17.491	105.991
23	8	Sam Mayer	JR Motorsports	Chevrolet	2:17.564	105.935
24	02	Brett Moffitt	Our Motorsports	Chevrolet	2:17.836	105.726
25	26	Kris Wright	Sam Hunt Racing	Toyota	2:17.862	105.706
26	39	Ryan Sieg	RSS Racing	Ford	2:17.993	105.605
27	2	Myatt Snider	Richard Childress Racing	Chevrolet	2:18.102	105.522
28	78	Ryan Ellis	B. J. McLeod Motorsports	Toyota	2:18.344	105.337
29	42	Timmy Hill	MBM Motorsports	Toyota	2:18.388	105.304
30	92	Josh Williams	DGM Racing	Chevrolet	2:18.618	105.129
31	13	Stephen Leicht	MBM Motorsports	Toyota	2:18.641	105.112
Qualified by owner's points
32	4	Landon Cassill	JD Motorsports	Chevrolet	2:19.010	104.833
33	44	Tommy Joe Martins	Martins Motorsports	Chevrolet	2:19.365	104.566
34	98	Riley Herbst	Stewart-Haas Racing	Ford	2:19.922	104.149
35	23	Natalie Decker	Our Motorsports	Chevrolet	2:27.342	98.905
36	9	Noah Gragson	JR Motorsports	Chevrolet	0.000	0.000
Failed to qualify
37	66	Matt Jaskol	MBM Motorsports	Toyota	2:18.869	104.939
38	52	Gray Gaulding	Jimmy Means Racing	Chevrolet	2:18.959	104.871
39	0	Jeffrey Earnhardt	JD Motorsports	Chevrolet	2:19.084	104.777
40	15	Colby Howard	JD Motorsports	Chevrolet	2:19.452	104.500
41	61	Boris Said	Hattori Racing Enterprises	Toyota	2:19.549	104.428
42	47	Kyle Weatherman	Mike Harmon Racing	Chevrolet	2:20.167	103.967
43	74	Bayley Currey	Mike Harmon Racing	Chevrolet	2:20.863	103.454
Official qualifying results

== Race results ==
Stage 1 Laps: 14

Fin	#	Driver	Team	Make	Pts
1	16	A.J. Allmendinger	Kaulig Racing	Chevrolet	10
2	22	Austin Cindric	Team Penske	Ford	9
3	10	Jeb Burton	Kaulig Racing	Chevrolet	8
4	11	Justin Haley	Kaulig Racing	Chevrolet	7
5	9	Noah Gragson	JR Motorsports	Chevrolet	6
6	18	Daniel Hemric	Joe Gibbs Racing	Toyota	5
7	7	Justin Allgaier	JR Motorsports	Chevrolet	4
8	1	Michael Annett	JR Motorsports	Chevrolet	3
9	07	Josh Bilicki	SS-Green Light Racing with Rick Ware Racing	Chevrolet	0
10	98	Riley Herbst	Stewart-Haas Racing	Ford	1

Stage 2 Laps: 15

Fin	#	Driver	Team	Make	Pts
1	16	A.J. Allmendinger	Kaulig Racing	Chevrolet	10
2	7	Justin Allgaier	JR Motorsports	Chevrolet	9
3	18	Daniel Hemric	Joe Gibbs Racing	Toyota	8
4	11	Justin Haley	Kaulig Racing	Chevrolet	7
5	54	Kyle Busch	Joe Gibbs Racing	Toyota	0
6	19	Brandon Jones	Joe Gibbs Racing	Toyota	5
7	81	Ty Gibbs	Joe Gibbs Racing	Toyota	4
8	22	Austin Cindric	Team Penske	Ford	3
9	20	Harrison Burton	Joe Gibbs Racing	Toyota	2
10	98	Riley Herbst	Stewart-Haas Racing	Ford	1

Stage 3 Laps: 16

Fin	St	#	Driver	Team	Make	Laps	Led	Status	Pts
1	5	54	Kyle Busch	Joe Gibbs Racing	Toyota	45	5	running	0
2	4	18	Daniel Hemric	Joe Gibbs Racing	Toyota	45	3	running	48
3	12	1	Michael Annett	JR Motorsports	Chevrolet	45	0	running	37
4	3	16	A.J. Allmendinger	Kaulig Racing	Chevrolet	45	12	running	53
5	10	20	Harrison Burton	Joe Gibbs Racing	Toyota	45	0	running	34
6	20	99	Kevin Harvick	B. J. McLeod Motorsports	Ford	45	0	running	0
7	34	98	Riley Herbst	Stewart-Haas Racing	Ford	45	0	running	32
8	2	22	Austin Cindric	Team Penske	Ford	45	10	running	41
9	36	9	Noah Gragson	JR Motorsports	Chevrolet	45	4	running	34
10	13	11	Justin Haley	Kaulig Racing	Chevrolet	45	0	running	41
11	19	68	Brandon Brown	Brandonbilt Motorsports	Chevrolet	45	0	running	26
12	6	7	Justin Allgaier	JR Motorsports	Chevrolet	45	5	running	38
13	15	5	Andy Lally	B. J. McLeod Motorsports	Toyota	45	0	running	24
14	8	10	Jeb Burton	Kaulig Racing	Chevrolet	45	0	running	31
15	33	44	Tommy Joe Martins	Martins Motorsports	Chevrolet	45	0	running	22
16	16	90	Preston Pardus	DGM Racing	Chevrolet	45	0	running	21
17	30	92	Josh Williams	DGM Racing	Chevrolet	45	0	running	20
18	7	31	Kaz Grala	Jordan Anderson Racing	Chevrolet	45	0	running	0
19	21	19	Brandon Jones	Joe Gibbs Racing	Toyota	45	4	running	23
20	29	42	Timmy Hill	MBM Motorsports	Toyota	45	0	running	0
21	22	36	Alex Labbé	DGM Racing	Chevrolet	45	0	running	16
22	26	39	Ryan Sieg	RSS Racing	Ford	45	0	running	15
23	27	2	Myatt Snider	Richard Childress Racing	Chevrolet	45	0	running	14
24	17	17	Cody Ware	SS-Green Light Racing with Rick Ware Racing	Ford	45	0	running	13
25	25	26	Kris Wright	Sam Hunt Racing	Toyota	45	0	running	0
26	31	13	Stephen Leicht	MBM Motorsports	Toyota	45	0	running	11
27	32	4	Landon Cassill	JD Motorsports	Chevrolet	45	0	running	10
28	9	51	Jeremy Clements	Jeremy Clements Racing	Chevrolet	44	0	running	9
29	14	07	Josh Bilicki	SS-Green Light Racing with Rick Ware Racing	Chevrolet	42	0	accident	0
30	28	78	Ryan Ellis	B. J. McLeod Motorsports	Toyota	42	0	accident	7
31	24	02	Brett Moffitt	Our Motorsports	Chevrolet	41	0	accident	6
32	35	23	Natalie Decker	Our Motorsports	Chevrolet	38	0	accident	5
33	1	81	Ty Gibbs	Joe Gibbs Racing	Toyota	34	2	transmission	8
34	11	48	Jade Buford	Big Machine Racing Team	Chevrolet	16	0	suspension	3
35	23	8	Sam Mayer	JR Motorsports	Chevrolet	12	0	accident	2
36	18	6	Spencer Pumpelly	JD Motorsports	Chevrolet	11	0	accident	1
Official race results

Previous race: 2021 Pocono Green 225	NASCAR Xfinity Series; 2021 season	Next race: 2021 Credit Karma Money 250
