= Manatawny Still Works =

Maker of American whiskey, rum, and gin

Coordinates: 40°15′55″N 75°40′4″W

- Industry: Manufacturing and distillation of liquors
- Founded: Pottstown, Pennsylvania (2013)
- Headquarters: Pottstown, Pennsylvania, US
- Key people: Paul Czachor (founder); John Giannopoulos (founder); Al Matarazzo (founder); Derek Menaldino (founder/executive committee); Jeff Vaughan (founder); Bill Manginelli (executive committee); Craig Smith (chairman); Max Pfeffer (master distiller)
- Website: manatawnystillworks.com

Manatawny Still Works (or MSW for short) is a maker of American whiskey, rum, and gin. It is produced in Pottstown, Pennsylvania along the bank of the Manatawny Creek.

== Production process ==
The Wash (distilling) for Manatawny is produced through a working relationship with Sly Fox Brewery, and is distilled in Italian copper stills from Barison Industry. After the distilling and filtering, the whiskey is stored in new oak barrels, which help to give aged products their signature flavor and color. Various methods are used to impart additional flavors to the product such as Small Batch Whiskey #16 which featured Rival Bros' Whistle and Cuss cold-brewed coffee and Small Batch Whiskey #14 which featured Swarmbustin' Honey's honey. Variations in barrel can also alter the flavor profile as with a limited-edition of the Hidden River Gin that was aged in tequila barrels and released in September 2017 and Small Batch Whiskey #13 which was finished in used port wine barrels.

=== Master distiller ===
Max Pfeffer, former lead brewer at Sly Fox Brewing Company, became Manatawny's master distiller in 2013. He is the first in the distillery's history and comes with a chemical engineering degree from Penn State and Master Brewer credential from UC Davis. In addition to having worked with Sly Fox, he also spent time brewing at Victory Brewing Company. The distiller's dog, Piper, is the namesake for the charitable organization founded by the distillery known as The Piper Project, which supports animal rescue organizations.

== Distillery ==
The Manatawny Still Works in Pottstown is situated along the Manatawny Creek. The names of the unaged rum and whiskey pay homage to local colonial Americans and ironworkers. The distillery is a tourist attraction, offering a full service cocktail bar, tours of the facility, and hosting food trucks and live music. Satellite tasting rooms and bottle shops operate in South Philadelphia at 1603 E Passyunk Avenue, Suburban Station Philadelphia at 1617 John F Kennedy Boulevard, and the Reading Terminal Market at 51 N 12th Street. A retail only location can be found in the lobby of One Penn Center in Center City Philadelphia.

=== Labels ===
- Hidden River Barrel Rested Gin: Amber color gin (94 proof/47% ABV).
- J. Potts Whiskey: Unaged whiskey (94 proof/47% ABV).
- Keystone Whiskey: Aged, four-grain, blended (90 proof/45% ABV).
- Odd Fellows No.214: Unaged gin (94 proof/47% ABV).
- Small Batch Rum: Aged light rum, numbered limited release within each batch (94 proof/47% ABV).
- Small Batch Whiskey: Unique blend, barrel aged, numbered limited release. Each Batch is distinctly numbered, starting with 01 released Dec 5,2014 (94 proof/47% ABV). As of April 2018, the most recent batch release was batch 16 in February 2018.
- T. Rutter Rum: Unaged rum (80 proof/40% ABV).
- Swarmbustin' Honey: A seasonal release of a recreation of small batch whiskey Batch 14 (84 proof/42% ABV).
- Maple Whiskey: A seasonal release of whiskey aged in barrels that and then flavored with maple syrup from Pennsylvania's Whiskey Hollow (84 proof/42% ABV).
- Pennsylvania Whiskey: This is Manatawny's "better whiskey. "Aged a minimum of two years, it is blended from select barrels of four grain whiskey (94 proof/47% ABV).
- Bottled in Bond: Four-year aged whiskey. Named after the 1897 Bottled in Bond Act (100 proof/50% ABV).

== Cocktails ==
- Manatawny Small Batch Whiskey is the alcoholic component of "Stein", a cocktail offered at The Brewer's Art in Baltimore.
- Manatawny Small Batch Whiskey is the alcoholic component of "Manatawny Smash", a cocktail offered at the Mt. Washington Tavern in Baltimore.
- Manatawny Small Batch Whiskey is the alcoholic component of "Old Plow Mule", a cocktail offered at Grill at Harryman House in Reisterstown, Maryland.

== Locations and distribution ==
As of June 1, 2016, Manatawny products can be purchased through distributors in Washington D.C., Delaware, Maryland, Montana, New Jersey, and Pennsylvania. As of April 1, 2017, New York had been added to the distribution network.

In addition to the distillery in Pottstown, PA, they also operate a bottle shop and tasting room in Philadelphia, PA adjacent to the "Singing Fountain" on Passyunk Ave and at One Penn Center in Center City Philadelphia, PA.

== See also ==
- Sly Fox Brewery
