= 2021 Alsco Uniforms 250 =

Race details
- Race 14 of 33 in the 2021 NASCAR Xfinity Series season
- Date: June 12, 2021
- Location: Texas Motor Speedway in Fort Worth, Texas
- Course: Permanent racing facility
- Course length: 1.50 miles (2.414 km)
- Distance: 171 laps, 256.5 mi (412.797 km)
- Scheduled distance: 167 laps, 250.5 mi (403.141 km)
- Average speed: 107.773 mph

Pole position
Driver	A. J. Allmendinger	Kaulig Racing
- Grid positions set by competition-based formula

Most laps led
Driver	Kyle Busch	Joe Gibbs Racing
- Laps: 94

Winner
No. 54	Kyle Busch	Joe Gibbs Racing

Television in the United States
- Network: FS1
- Announcers: Adam Alexander, Joey Logano, and Brad Keselowski

The 2021 Alsco Uniforms 250 was a NASCAR Xfinity Series race held on June 12, 2021. It was contested over 171 laps—extended from 167 laps due to an overtime finish—on the 1.50-mile (2.41 km) Texas Motor Speedway oval. It was the fourteenth race of the 2021 NASCAR Xfinity Series season. Joe Gibbs Racing driver Kyle Busch collected his second win of the season, and the 99th of his career.

== Report ==
The layout of Texas Motor Speedway, the venue where the race was held.

=== Background ===
Texas Motor Speedway is a speedway located in the northernmost portion of the U.S. city of Fort Worth, Texas – the portion located in Denton County, Texas. The track measures 1.5 miles (2.4 km) around and is banked 24 degrees in the turns, and is of the oval design, where the front straightaway juts outward slightly. The track layout is similar to Atlanta Motor Speedway and Charlotte Motor Speedway (formerly Lowe's Motor Speedway). The track is owned by Speedway Motorsports, Inc., the same company that owns Atlanta and Charlotte Motor Speedways, as well as the short-track Bristol Motor Speedway.

=== Entry list ===
- (R) denotes rookie driver.
- (i) denotes driver who is ineligible for series driver points.

No.	Driver	Team	Manufacturer
0	Jeffrey Earnhardt	JD Motorsports	Chevrolet
1	Michael Annett	JR Motorsports	Chevrolet
02	Brett Moffitt	Our Motorsports	Chevrolet
2	Myatt Snider	Richard Childress Racing	Chevrolet
4	Ryan Vargas (R)	JD Motorsports	Chevrolet
5	Matt Mills	B. J. McLeod Motorsports	Toyota
6	Landon Cassill	JD Motorsports	Chevrolet
7	Justin Allgaier	JR Motorsports	Chevrolet
07	Joe Graf Jr.	SS-Green Light Racing	Chevrolet
8	Josh Berry (R)	JR Motorsports	Chevrolet
9	Noah Gragson	JR Motorsports	Chevrolet
10	Jeb Burton	Kaulig Racing	Chevrolet
11	Justin Haley	Kaulig Racing	Chevrolet
13	Timmy Hill (i)	MBM Motorsports	Toyota
15	Colby Howard	JD Motorsports	Chevrolet
16	A. J. Allmendinger	Kaulig Racing	Chevrolet
17	Garrett Smithley	SS-Green Light Racing with Rick Ware Racing	Chevrolet
18	Daniel Hemric	Joe Gibbs Racing	Toyota
19	Brandon Jones	Joe Gibbs Racing	Toyota
20	Harrison Burton	Joe Gibbs Racing	Toyota
22	Austin Cindric	Team Penske	Ford
23	Tanner Berryhill	Our Motorsports	Chevrolet
26	Brandon Gdovic	Sam Hunt Racing	Toyota
31	Jordan Anderson (i)	Jordan Anderson Racing	Chevrolet
36	Alex Labbé	DGM Racing	Chevrolet
39	Ryan Sieg	RSS Racing	Ford
44	Tommy Joe Martins	Martins Motorsports	Chevrolet
47	Kyle Weatherman	Mike Harmon Racing	Chevrolet
48	Jade Buford (R)	Big Machine Racing Team	Chevrolet
51	Jeremy Clements	Jeremy Clements Racing	Chevrolet
52	Gray Gaulding	Means Racing	Chevrolet
54	Kyle Busch (i)	Joe Gibbs Racing	Toyota
61	Matt Jaskol	Hattori Racing Enterprises	Toyota
66	David Starr	MBM Motorsports	Toyota
68	Brandon Brown	Brandonbilt Motorsports	Chevrolet
74	Bayley Currey (i)	Mike Harmon Racing	Chevrolet
77	Dillon Bassett	Bassett Racing	Chevrolet
78	Jesse Little	B. J. McLeod Motorsports	Chevrolet
90	Ronnie Bassett Jr.	DGM Racing	Chevrolet
92	Josh Williams	DGM Racing	Chevrolet
98	Riley Herbst	Stewart-Haas Racing	Ford
99	Stefan Parsons	B. J. McLeod Motorsports	Chevrolet
Official entry list

== Qualifying ==
A. J. Allmendinger was awarded the pole for the race as determined by competition-based formula. Dillon Bassett and Timmy Hill did not have enough points to qualify for the race.

=== Starting Lineups ===
Pos	No	Driver	Team	Manufacturer
1	16	A. J. Allmendinger	Kaulig Racing	Chevrolet
2	11	Justin Haley	Kaulig Racing	Chevrolet
3	19	Brandon Jones	Joe Gibbs Racing	Toyota
4	22	Austin Cindric	Team Penske	Ford
5	18	Daniel Hemric	Joe Gibbs Racing	Toyota
6	1	Michael Annett	JR Motorsports	Chevrolet
7	68	Brandon Brown	Brandonbilt Motorsports	Chevrolet
8	10	Jeb Burton	Kaulig Racing	Chevrolet
9	39	Ryan Sieg	RSS Racing	Ford
10	36	Alex Labbé	DGM Racing	Chevrolet
11	92	Josh Williams	DGM Racing	Chevrolet
12	98	Riley Herbst	Stewart-Haas Racing	Ford
13	48	Jade Buford (R)	Big Machine Racing Team	Chevrolet
14	54	Kyle Busch (i)	Joe Gibbs Racing	Toyota
15	4	Ryan Vargas (R)	JD Motorsports	Chevrolet
16	7	Justin Allgaier	JR Motorsports	Chevrolet
17	2	Myatt Snider	Richard Childress Racing	Chevrolet
18	20	Harrison Burton	Joe Gibbs Racing	Toyota
19	02	Brett Moffitt	Our Motorsports	Chevrolet
20	51	Jeremy Clements	Jeremy Clements Racing	Chevrolet
21	23	Tanner Berryhill	Our Motorsports	Chevrolet
22	6	Landon Cassill	JD Motorsports	Chevrolet
23	52	Gray Gaulding	Means Motorsports	Chevrolet
24	5	Matt Mills	B. J. McLeod Motorsports	Toyota
25	78	Jesse Little	B. J. McLeod Motorsports	Chevrolet
26	15	Colby Howard	JD Motorsports	Chevrolet
27	17	Garrett Smithley	SS-Green Light Racing with Rick Ware Racing	Chevrolet
28	8	Josh Berry (R)	JR Motorsports	Chevrolet
29	47	Kyle Weatherman	Mike Harmon Racing	Chevrolet
30	9	Noah Gragson	JR Motorsports	Chevrolet
31	66	David Starr	MBM Motorsports	Toyota
32	31	Jordan Anderson (i)	Jordan Anderson Racing	Chevrolet
33	0	Jeffrey Earnhardt	JD Motorsports	Chevrolet
34	26	Brandon Gdovic	Sam Hunt Racing	Toyota
35	07	Joe Graf Jr.	SS-Green Light Racing	Chevrolet
36	44	Tommy Joe Martins	Martins Motorsports	Chevrolet
37	99	Stefan Parsons	B. J. McLeod Motorsports	Chevrolet
38	90	Ronnie Bassett Jr.	DGM Racing	Chevrolet
39	74	Bayley Currey (i)	Mike Harmon Racing	Chevrolet
40	61	Matt Jaskol	MBM Motorsports	Toyota
Official qualifying results

== Race ==
=== Race results ===
==== Stage Results ====
Stage One Laps: 40

Pos	No	Driver	Team	Manufacturer	Points
1	22	Austin Cindric	Team Penske	Ford	10
2	18	Daniel Hemric	Joe Gibbs Racing	Toyota	9
3	54	Kyle Busch (i)	Joe Gibbs Racing	Toyota	0
4	19	Brandon Jones	Joe Gibbs Racing	Toyota	7
5	11	Justin Haley	Kaulig Racing	Chevrolet	6
6	16	A. J. Allmendinger	Kaulig Racing	Chevrolet	5
7	7	Justin Allgaier	JR Motorsports	Chevrolet	4
8	1	Michael Annett	JR Motorsports	Chevrolet	3
9	20	Harrison Burton	Joe Gibbs Racing	Toyota	2
10	9	Noah Gragson	JR Motorsports	Chevrolet	1

Stage Two Laps: 40

Pos	No	Driver	Team	Manufacturer	Points
1	11	Kyle Busch (i)	Joe Gibbs Racing	Toyota	0
2	19	Brandon Jones	Joe Gibbs Racing	Toyota	9
3	10	Jeb Burton	Joe Gibbs Racing	Chevrolet	8
4	20	Harrison Burton	Joe Gibbs Racing	Toyota	7
5	9	Noah Gragson	JR Motorsports	Chevrolet	6
6	7	Justin Allgaier	JR Motorsports	Chevrolet	5
7	16	A. J. Allmendinger	Kaulig Racing	Chevrolet	4
8	8	Josh Berry (R)	JR Motorsports	Chevrolet	3
9	98	Riley Herbst	Stewart-Haas Racing	Ford	2
10	1	Michael Annett	JR Motorsports	Chevrolet	1

=== Final Stage Results ===
Laps: 87

Pos	Grid	No	Driver	Team	Manufacturer	Laps	Points	Status
1	14	54	Kyle Busch (i)	Joe Gibbs Racing	Toyota	171	0	Running
2	16	7	Justin Allgaier	JR Motorsports	Chevrolet	171	44	Running
3	4	22	Austin Cindric	Team Penske	Ford	171	52	Running
4	5	18	Daniel Hemric	Joe Gibbs Racing	Toyota	171	51	Running
5	3	19	Brandon Jones	Joe Gibbs Racing	Toyota	171	39	Running
6	1	16	A. J. Allmendinger	Kaulig Racing	Chevrolet	171	40	Running
7	30	9	Noah Gragson	JR Motorsports	Chevrolet	171	37	Running
8	19	02	Brett Moffitt	Our Motorsports	Chevrolet	171	29	Running
9	2	11	Justin Haley	Kaulig Racing	Chevrolet	171	34	Running
10	6	1	Michael Annett	JR Motorsports	Chevrolet	171	31	Running
11	9	39	Ryan Sieg	RSS Racing	Ford	171	26	Running
12	12	98	Riley Herbst	Stewart-Haas Racing	Ford	171	27	Running
13	7	68	Brandon Brown	Brandonbilt Motorsports	Chevrolet	171	24	Running
14	20	51	Jeremy Clements	Jeremy Clements Racing	Chevrolet	171	23	Running
15	22	6	Landon Cassill	JD Motorsports	Chevrolet	171	22	Running
16	13	48	Jade Buford (R)	Big Machine Racing Team	Chevrolet	171	21	Running
17	11	92	Josh Williams	Means Motorsports	Chevrolet	171	20	Running
18	10	36	Alex Labbé	DGM Racing	Chevrolet	171	19	Running
19	28	8	Josh Berry (R)	JR Motorsports	Chevrolet	171	21	Running
20	31	66	David Starr	MBM Motorsports	Toyota	171	17	Running
21	36	44	Tommy Joe Martins	Martins Motorsports	Chevrolet	171	16	Running
22	38	90	Ronnie Bassett Jr.	DGM Racing	Chevrolet	171	15	Running
23	34	26	Brandon Gdovic	Sam Hunt Racing	Toyota	171	14	Running
24	15	4	Ryan Vargas	JD Motorsports	Chevrolet	171	13	Running
25	27	17	Garrett Smithley	SS-Green Light Racing with Rick Ware Racing	Chevrolet	171	12	Running
26	24	5	Matt Mills	B. J. McLeod Motorsports	Toyota	171	11	Running
27	40	61	Matt Jaskol	MBM Motorsports	Toyota	168	10	Running
28	26	15	Colby Howard	JD Motorsports	Ford	167	9	Running
29	25	78	Jesse Little	B. J. McLeod Motorsports	Chevrolet	166	8	Running
30	18	20	Harrison Burton	Joe Gibbs Racing	Toyota	163	16	Accident
31	35	07	Joe Graf Jr.	SS-Green Light Racing	Chevrolet	162	6	Running
32	8	10	Jeb Burton	Kaulig Racing	Chevrolet	159	5	Running
33	17	2	Myatt Snider	Richard Childress Racing	Chevrolet	156	4	Accident
34	32	31	Jordan Anderson (i)	Jordan Anderson Racing	Chevrolet	120	0	Running
35	37	99	Stefan Parsons	B. J. McLeod Motorsports	Chevrolet	110	2	Accident
36	33	0	Jeffrey Earnhardt	JD Motorsports	Chevrolet	107	1	Accident
37	29	47	Kyle Weatherman	Mike Harmon Racing	Chevrolet	100	1	Fuel pump
38	23	52	Gray Gaulding	Means Motorsports	Chevrolet	89	1	Accident
39	21	23	Tanner Berryhill	Our Motorsports	Chevrolet	88	1	Accident
40	39	74	Bayley Currey (i)	Mike Harmon Racing	Chevrolet	0	0	Electrical
Official race results

=== Race statistics ===
- Lead changes: 14 among 8 different drivers
- Cautions/Laps: 10 for 52
- Time of race: 2 hours, 22 minutes, and 48 seconds
- Average speed: 107.773 mph (173.444 km/h)

Previous race: 2021 B&L Transport 170	NASCAR Xfinity Series; 2021 season	Next race: 2021 Tennessee Lottery 250
