= 2019 ToyotaCare 250 =

Race details
- Race 8 of 33 in the 2019 NASCAR Xfinity Series season
- Date: April 12, 2019
- Location: Richmond Raceway in Richmond, Virginia
- Course: Permanent racing facility
- Course length: 0.75 miles (1.2 km)
- Distance: 250 laps, 187.5 mi (301.8 km)

Pole position
Driver	Riley Herbst	Joe Gibbs Racing
- Time: N/A

Most laps led
Driver	Cole Custer	Stewart-Haas Racing with Biagi-DenBeste
- Laps: 122

Winner
No. 00	Cole Custer	Stewart-Haas Racing with Biagi-DenBeste

Television in the United States
- Network: FS1

Radio in the United States
- Radio: MRN

The 2019 ToyotaCare 250 was a NASCAR Xfinity Series race held on April 12, 2019, at Richmond Raceway in Richmond, Virginia. Contested over 250 laps on the 0.75 mile (1.2 km) asphalt short track, it was the eighth race of the 2019 NASCAR Xfinity Series season. This was the season's second Dash 4 Cash race.

== Background ==
=== Track ===
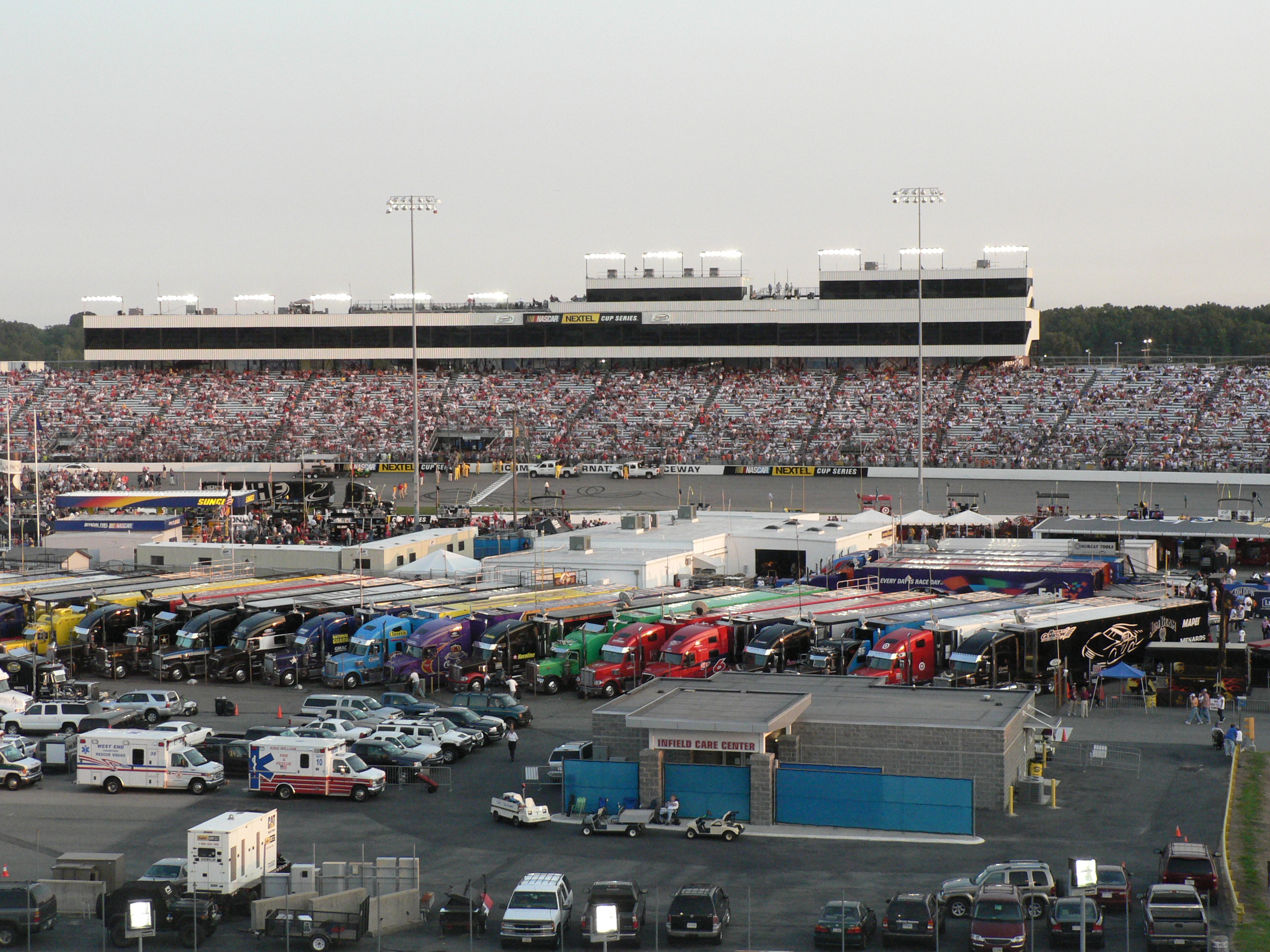
Richmond Raceway, the track where the race was held.

Richmond Raceway is a 3/4-mile (1.2 km), D-shaped, asphalt race track located just outside Richmond, Virginia in Henrico County. It hosts the Monster Energy NASCAR Cup Series and Xfinity Series. Known as "America's premier short track", it formerly hosted a NASCAR Gander Outdoors Truck Series race, an IndyCar Series race, and two USAC sprint car races. Richmond Raceway is also one of only a few tracks to host all of its events at night.

=== Dash 4 Cash ===
At this race, Christopher Bell, Tyler Reddick, Cole Custer, and Chase Briscoe were the four drivers eligible for the Dash 4 Cash extra prize money as they placed in the top 4 in the previous race.

== Entry list ==
Amongst the drivers entered for the race were Elliott Sadler, a previously dominant driver in the series who came out of retirement for the race, and three drivers all making their Xfinity debuts: Dillon Bassett, Tyler Matthews and Colin Garrett.

No.	Driver	Team	Manufacturer
00	Cole Custer	Stewart-Haas Racing with Biagi-DenBeste Racing	Ford
0	Garrett Smithley	JD Motorsports	Chevrolet
01	Stephen Leicht	JD Motorsports	Chevrolet
1	Michael Annett	JR Motorsports	Chevrolet
2	Tyler Reddick	Richard Childress Racing	Chevrolet
4	Ross Chastain	JD Motorsports	Chevrolet
5	Matt Mills (R)	B. J. McLeod Motorsports	Chevrolet
07	Ray Black Jr.	SS-Green Light Racing	Chevrolet
7	Justin Allgaier	JR Motorsports	Chevrolet
08	Gray Gaulding (R)	SS-Green Light Racing	Chevrolet
8	Zane Smith	JR Motorsports	Chevrolet
9	Noah Gragson (R)	JR Motorsports	Chevrolet
10	Elliott Sadler	Kaulig Racing	Chevrolet
11	Justin Haley (R)	Kaulig Racing	Chevrolet
13	Timmy Hill	MBM Motorsports	Toyota
15	Tyler Matthews (R)	JD Motorsports	Chevrolet
17	Kyle Weatherman (R)	Rick Ware Racing	Chevrolet
18	Riley Herbst	Joe Gibbs Racing	Toyota
19	Brandon Jones	Joe Gibbs Racing	Toyota
20	Christopher Bell	Joe Gibbs Racing	Toyota
21	Kaz Grala	Richard Childress Racing	Chevrolet
22	Austin Cindric	Team Penske	Ford
23	John Hunter Nemechek (R)	GMS Racing	Chevrolet
35	Joey Gase	MBM Motorsports	Toyota
36	Donald Theetge	DGM Racing	Chevrolet
38	Jeff Green	RSS Racing	Chevrolet
39	Ryan Sieg	RSS Racing	Chevrolet
42	Chad Finchum	MBM Motorsports	Toyota
51	Jeremy Clements	Jeremy Clements Racing	Chevrolet
52	David Starr	Jimmy Means Racing	Chevrolet
66	Colin Garrett (R)	MBM Motorsports	Toyota
74	Mike Harmon	Mike Harmon Racing	Chevrolet
78	Vinnie Miller	B. J. McLeod Motorsports	Chevrolet
86	Mason Diaz (R)	Brandonbilt Motorsports	Chevrolet
89	Morgan Shepherd	Shepherd Racing Ventures	Chevrolet
90	Dillon Bassett (R)	DGM Racing	Chevrolet
92	Josh Williams	DGM Racing	Chevrolet
93	Brandon Brown (R)	RSS Racing	Chevrolet
98	Chase Briscoe (R)	Stewart-Haas Racing with Biagi-DenBeste Racing	Ford
99	B. J. McLeod	B. J. McLeod Motorsports	Toyota

== Practice ==
Noah Gragson was the fastest in the only practice session with a time of 22.542 seconds and a speed of 119.776 mph (192.761 km/h).

Pos	No.	Driver	Team	Manufacturer	Time	Speed
1	9	Noah Gragson (R)	JR Motorsports	Chevrolet	22.542	119.776
2	98	Chase Briscoe (R)	Stewart-Haas Racing with Biagi-DenBeste Racing	Ford	22.657	119.168
3	00	Cole Custer	Stewart-Haas Racing with Biagi-DenBeste Racing	Ford	22.696	118.964

== Qualifying ==
Qualifying was canceled due to rain, so the starting lineup was determined by owner's points standings at the time of the race, giving the pole to Riley Herbst.

=== Qualifying results ===
Pos	No	Driver	Team	Manufacturer	Time
1	18	Riley Herbst	Joe Gibbs Racing	Toyota	0.000
2	2	Tyler Reddick	Richard Childress Racing	Chevrolet	0.000
3	20	Christopher Bell	Joe Gibbs Racing	Toyota	0.000
4	00	Cole Custer	Stewart-Haas Racing with Biagi-DenBeste Racing	Ford	0.000
5	22	Austin Cindric	Team Penske	Ford	0.000
6	1	Michael Annett	JR Motorsports	Chevrolet	0.000
7	7	Justin Allgaier	JR Motorsports	Chevrolet	0.000
8	19	Brandon Jones	Joe Gibbs Racing	Toyota	0.000
9	98	Chase Briscoe (R)	Stewart-Haas Racing with Biagi-DenBeste Racing	Ford	0.000
10	8	Zane Smith	JR Motorsports	Chevrolet	0.000
11	23	John Hunter Nemechek (R)	GMS Racing	Chevrolet	0.000
12	9	Noah Gragson (R)	JR Motorsports	Chevrolet	0.000
13	39	Ryan Sieg	RSS Racing	Chevrolet	0.000
14	11	Justin Haley (R)	Kaulig Racing	Chevrolet	0.000
15	4	Ross Chastain	JD Motorsports	Chevrolet	0.000
16	86	Mason Diaz (R)	Brandonbilt Motorsports	Chevrolet	0.000
17	08	Gray Gaulding (R)	SS-Green Light Racing	Chevrolet	0.000
18	51	Jeremy Clements	Jeremy Clements Racing	Chevrolet	0.000
19	07	Ray Black Jr.	SS-Green Light Racing	Chevrolet	0.000
20	0	Garrett Smithley	JD Motorsports	Chevrolet	0.000
21	36	Donald Theetge	DGM Racing	Chevrolet	0.000
22	52	David Starr	Jimmy Means Racing	Chevrolet	0.000
23	15	Tyler Matthews (R)	JD Motorsports	Chevrolet	0.000
24	66	Colin Garrett (R)	MBM Motorsports	Toyota	0.000
25	42	Chad Finchum	MBM Motorsports	Toyota	0.000
26	78	Vinnie Miller	B. J. McLeod Motorsports	Chevrolet	0.000
27	10	Elliott Sadler	Kaulig Racing	Chevrolet	0.000
28	35	Joey Gase	MBM Motorsports	Toyota	0.000
29	5	Matt Mills (R)	B. J. McLeod Motorsports	Chevrolet	0.000
30	99	B. J. McLeod	B. J. McLeod Motorsports	Toyota	0.000
31	38	Jeff Green	RSS Racing	Chevrolet	0.000
32	01	Stephen Leicht	JD Motorsports	Chevrolet	0.000
33	90	Dillon Bassett (R)	DGM Racing	Chevrolet	0.000
34	93	Brandon Brown (R)	RSS Racing	Chevrolet	0.000
35	74	Mike Harmon	Mike Harmon Racing	Chevrolet	0.000
36	17	Kyle Weatherman (R)	Rick Ware Racing	Chevrolet	0.000
37	13	Timmy Hill	MBM Motorsports	Toyota	0.000
38	21	Kaz Grala	Richard Childress Racing	Chevrolet	0.000
Did not qualify
39	92	Josh Williams	DGM Racing	Chevrolet	0.000
Withdrew
40	89	Morgan Shepherd	Shepherd Racing Ventures	Chevrolet	0.000

- Morgan Shepherd initially qualified for the race, but withdrew so that Kaz Grala's fully funded 21 would qualify for the race.

. – Eligible for Dash 4 Cash prize money

== Race ==
=== Summary ===
Riley Herbst began on pole, but quickly lost the lead after two laps. Mason Diaz brought out the first caution after receiving a flat tire, eliminating him from the race. Christopher Bell led the most laps during stage 1, but Justin Allgaier managed to overtake him and win the stage. Bell spun out after contact from John Hunter Nemechek, but saved it. Noah Gragson also got tapped by Kaz Grala, but did not accumulate significant damage. Cole Custer overtook Allgaier, who pitted off-sequence with the others. Custer then won stage 2 and led the most laps.

Bell had issues on pit road after Nemechek spun out David Starr, causing him to fall behind. Austin Cindric briefly took the lead for seven laps after a caution caused by an accident involving Gragson, Grala, Gray Gaulding, and Justin Haley. Custer won the race after overtaking and holding off Cindric, also getting the extra Dash 4 Cash prize money.

At the next race, Custer, Cindric, Allgaier, and Tyler Reddick would be eligible for Dash 4 Cash.

=== Stage Results ===
Stage One Laps: 75

Pos	No	Driver	Team	Manufacturer	Points
1	7	Justin Allgaier	JR Motorsports	Chevrolet	10
2	20	Christopher Bell	Joe Gibbs Racing	Toyota	9
3	00	Cole Custer	Stewart-Haas Racing with Biagi-DenBeste	Ford	8
4	9	Noah Gragson (R)	JR Motorsports	Chevrolet	7
5	23	John Hunter Nemechek (R)	GMS Racing	Chevrolet	6
6	2	Tyler Reddick	Richard Childress Racing	Chevrolet	5
7	22	Austin Cindric	Team Penske	Ford	4
8	8	Zane Smith	JR Motorsports	Chevrolet	3
9	98	Chase Briscoe (R)	Stewart-Haas Racing with Biagi-DenBeste	Ford	2
10	19	Brandon Jones	Joe Gibbs Racing	Toyota	1

Stage Two Laps: 75

Pos	No	Driver	Team	Manufacturer	Points
1	00	Cole Custer	Stewart-Haas Racing with Biagi-DenBeste	Ford	10
2	22	Austin Cindric	Team Penske	Ford	9
3	23	John Hunter Nemechek (R)	GMS Racing	Chevrolet	8
4	8	Zane Smith	JR Motorsports	Chevrolet	7
5	39	Ryan Sieg	RSS Racing	Chevrolet	6
6	9	Noah Gragson (R)	JR Motorsports	Chevrolet	5
7	98	Chase Briscoe (R)	Stewart-Haas Racing with Biagi-DenBeste	Ford	4
8	2	Tyler Reddick	Richard Childress Racing	Chevrolet	3
9	19	Brandon Jones	Joe Gibbs Racing	Toyota	2
10	11	Justin Haley (R)	Kaulig Racing	Chevrolet	1

=== Final Stage Results ===
Stage Three Laps: 100

Pos	Grid	No	Driver	Team	Manufacturer	Laps	Points
1	4	00	Cole Custer	Stewart-Haas Racing with Biagi-DenBeste	Ford	250	58
2	5	22	Austin Cindric	Team Penske	Ford	250	48
3	7	7	Justin Allgaier	JR Motorsports	Chevrolet	250	44
4	2	2	Tyler Reddick	Richard Childress Racing	Chevrolet	250	41
5	13	39	Ryan Sieg	RSS Racing	Chevrolet	250	38
6	10	8	Zane Smith	JR Motorsports	Chevrolet	250	41
7	11	23	John Hunter Nemechek (R)	GMS Racing	Chevrolet	250	44
8	9	98	Chase Briscoe (R)	Stewart-Haas Racing with Biagi-DenBeste	Ford	250	35
9	1	18	Riley Herbst	Joe Gibbs Racing	Toyota	250	28
10	14	11	Justin Haley (R)	Kaulig Racing	Chevrolet	250	28
11	15	4	Ross Chastain	JD Motorsports	Chevrolet	250	26
12	27	10	Elliott Sadler	Kaulig Racing	Chevrolet	250	25
13	6	1	Michael Annett	JR Motorsports	Chevrolet	250	24
14	38	21	Kaz Grala	Richard Childress Racing	Chevrolet	250	23
15	33	90	Dillon Bassett (R)	DGM Racing	Chevrolet	250	22
16	3	20	Christopher Bell	Joe Gibbs Racing	Toyota	250	30
17	17	08	Gray Gaulding	SS-Green Light Racing	Chevrolet	250	20
18	32	01	Stephen Leicht (R)	JD Motorsports	Chevrolet	250	19
19	20	0	Garrett Smithley	JD Motorsports	Chevrolet	250	18
20	34	93	Brandon Brown (R)	RSS Racing	Chevrolet	250	17
21	19	07	Ray Black Jr.	SS-Green Light Racing	Chevrolet	250	16
22	12	9	Noah Gragson (R)	JR Motorsports	Chevrolet	249	27
23	28	35	Joey Gase	MBM Motorsports	Toyota	249	14
24	23	15	Tyler Matthews (R)	JD Motorsports	Chevrolet	248	13
25	21	36	Donald Theetge	DGM Racing	Chevrolet	247	12
26	24	66	Colin Garrett (R)	MBM Motorsports	Toyota	247	11
27	26	78	Vinnie Miller	B. J. McLeod Motorsports	Chevrolet	246	10
28	29	5	Matt Mills (R)	B. J. McLeod Motorsports	Chevrolet	245	9
29	22	52	David Starr	Jimmy Means Racing	Chevrolet	245	8
30	30	99	B. J. McLeod	B. J. McLeod Motorsports	Toyota	245	7
31	35	74	Mike Harmon	Mike Harmon Racing	Chevrolet	243	6
32	36	17	Kyle Weatherman (R)	Rick Ware Racing	Chevrolet	237	5
33	8	19	Brandon Jones	Joe Gibbs Racing	Toyota	175	7
34	25	42	Chad Finchum	MBM Motorsports	Toyota	119	3
35	18	51	Jeremy Clements	Jeremy Clements Racing	Chevrolet	112	2
36	16	86	Mason Diaz (R)	Brandonbilt Motorsports	Chevrolet	63	1
37	37	13	Timmy Hill	MBM Motorsports	Toyota	15	1
38	31	38	Jeff Green	RSS Racing	Chevrolet	10	1

. – Won the Dash 4 Cash prize money and subsequently qualified for the Dash 4 Cash prize money in the next race.

. – Qualified for Dash 4 Cash prize money in the next race.

Previous race: 2019 Alsco 300 (Bristol)	NASCAR Xfinity Series; 2019 season	Next race: 2019 MoneyLion 300
