= 2019 LTi Printing 250 =

Race details
- Race 13 of 33 in the 2019 NASCAR Xfinity Series
- Date: June 8, 2019
- Location: Michigan International Speedway in Brooklyn, Michigan
- Course: Permanent racing facility
- Course length: 2.0 miles (3.219 km)
- Distance: 125 laps, 250 mi (402.336 km)

Pole position
Driver	Paul Menard	Team Penske
- Time: 37.237

Most laps led
Driver	Paul Menard	Team Penske
- Laps: 56

Winner
No. 2	Tyler Reddick	Richard Childress Racing

Television in the United States
- Network: FS1

Radio in the United States
- Radio: MRN

The 2019 LTi Printing 250 was a NASCAR Xfinity Series race held on June 8, 2019, at Michigan International Speedway in Brooklyn, Michigan. Contested over 125 laps on the 2-mile (3.2-kilometre) D-shaped oval, it was the 13th race of the 2019 NASCAR Xfinity Series season.

Defending series champion Tyler Reddick (Richard Childress Racing) took his third victory in five races, taking the lead from Cole Custer (Stewart–Haas Racing with Biagi–DenBeste Racing) with eleven laps remaining and pulled clear of JR Motorsports teammates Noah Gragson and Michael Annett, while Custer faded to twelfth place.

== Background ==
=== Track ===
Michigan International Speedway is a moderate-banked D-shaped speedway located in Brooklyn, Michigan. The track is used primarily for NASCAR events. It is sometimes known as a "sister track" to Texas World Speedway, and was used as the basis of Auto Club Speedway. The track is owned by International Speedway Corporation. Michigan International Speedway is recognized as one of motorsports' premier facilities because of its wide racing surface and high banking (by open-wheel standards; the 18-degree banking is modest by stock car standards).

== Entry list ==
No.	Driver	Team	Manufacturer
00	Cole Custer	Stewart-Haas Racing with Biagi-DenBeste Racing	Ford
0	Garrett Smithley	JD Motorsports	Chevrolet
01	Stephen Leicht	JD Motorsports	Chevrolet
1	Michael Annett	JR Motorsports	Chevrolet
2	Tyler Reddick	Richard Childress Racing	Chevrolet
4	Ross Chastain (i)	JD Motorsports	Chevrolet
5	Matt Mills (R)	B. J. McLeod Motorsports	Chevrolet
07	Ray Black Jr.	SS-Green Light Racing	Chevrolet
7	Justin Allgaier	JR Motorsports	Chevrolet
08	Gray Gaulding (R)	SS-Green Light Racing	Chevrolet
8	Jeb Burton	JR Motorsports	Chevrolet
9	Noah Gragson (R)	JR Motorsports	Chevrolet
11	Justin Haley (R)	Kaulig Racing	Chevrolet
12	Paul Menard (i)	Team Penske	Ford
13	Timmy Hill	MBM Motorsports	Toyota
15	B. J. McLeod	JD Motorsports	Chevrolet
17	Bayley Currey (i)	Rick Ware Racing	Chevrolet
18	Riley Herbst	Joe Gibbs Racing	Toyota
19	Brandon Jones	Joe Gibbs Racing	Toyota
20	Christopher Bell	Joe Gibbs Racing	Toyota
21	Joe Graf Jr.	Richard Childress Racing	Chevrolet
22	Austin Cindric	Team Penske	Ford
23	John Hunter Nemechek (R)	GMS Racing	Chevrolet
35	Joey Gase	MBM Motorsports	Toyota
36	Josh Williams	DGM Racing	Chevrolet
38	Jeff Green	RSS Racing	Chevrolet
39	Ryan Sieg	RSS Racing	Chevrolet
42	Chad Finchum	MBM Motorsports	Toyota
51	Jeremy Clements	Jeremy Clements Racing	Chevrolet
52	David Starr	Jimmy Means Racing	Chevrolet
66	Tyler Hill (i)	MBM Motorsports	Toyota
74	Kyle Weatherman	Mike Harmon Racing	Chevrolet
78	Vinnie Miller	B. J. McLeod Motorsports	Chevrolet
86	Brandon Brown	Brandonbilt Motorsports	Chevrolet
89	Landon Cassill	Shepherd Racing Ventures	Chevrolet
90	Dillon Bassett	DGM Racing	Chevrolet
93	Josh Bilicki	RSS Racing	Chevrolet
98	Chase Briscoe (R)	Stewart-Haas Racing with Biagi-DenBeste Racing	Ford
99	Tommy Joe Martins	B. J. McLeod Motorsports	Toyota

== Practice ==
=== First practice ===
Christopher Bell was the fastest in the first practice session with a time of 38.143 seconds and a speed of 188.763 mph (303.785 km/h).

Pos	No.	Driver	Team	Manufacturer	Time	Speed
1	20	Christopher Bell	Joe Gibbs Racing	Toyota	38.143	188.763
2	2	Tyler Reddick	Richard Childress Racing	Chevrolet	38.189	188.536
3	11	Justin Haley (R)	Kaulig Racing	Chevrolet	38.261	188.181

=== Final practice ===
Christopher Bell was the fastest in the final practice session with a time of 38.091 seconds and a speed of 189.021 mph (304.200 km/h).

Pos	No.	Driver	Team	Manufacturer	Time	Speed
1	20	Christopher Bell	Joe Gibbs Racing	Toyota	38.091	189.021
2	00	Cole Custer	Stewart-Haas Racing with Biagi-DenBeste Racing	Ford	38.290	188.039
3	2	Tyler Reddick	Richard Childress Racing	Chevrolet	38.306	187.960

== Qualifying ==
Paul Menard scored the pole for the race with a time of 37.237 seconds and a speed of 193.356 mph (311.176 km/h).

=== Qualifying results ===
Pos	No	Driver	Team	Manufacturer	Time
1	12	Paul Menard (i)	Team Penske	Ford	37.237
2	20	Christopher Bell	Joe Gibbs Racing	Toyota	37.289
3	19	Brandon Jones	Joe Gibbs Racing	Toyota	37.422
4	9	Noah Gragson (R)	JR Motorsports	Chevrolet	37.503
5	22	Austin Cindric	Team Penske	Ford	37.522
6	00	Cole Custer	Stewart-Haas Racing with Biagi-DenBeste Racing	Ford	37.612
7	1	Michael Annett	JR Motorsports	Chevrolet	37.644
8	23	John Hunter Nemechek (R)	GMS Racing	Chevrolet	37.676
9	39	Ryan Sieg	RSS Racing	Chevrolet	37.718
10	2	Tyler Reddick	Richard Childress Racing	Chevrolet	37.723
11	8	Jeb Burton	JR Motorsports	Chevrolet	37.725
12	7	Justin Allgaier	JR Motorsports	Chevrolet	37.798
13	11	Justin Haley (R)	Kaulig Racing	Chevrolet	37.825
14	98	Chase Briscoe (R)	Stewart-Haas Racing with Biagi-DenBeste Racing	Ford	37.892
15	4	Ross Chastain (i)	JD Motorsports	Chevrolet	38.064
16	89	Landon Cassill	Shepherd Racing Ventures	Chevrolet	38.198
17	51	Jeremy Clements	Jeremy Clements Racing	Chevrolet	38.207
18	5	Matt Mills (R)	B. J. McLeod Motorsports	Chevrolet	38.218
19	90	Dillon Bassett	DGM Racing	Chevrolet	38.263
20	93	Josh Bilicki	RSS Racing	Chevrolet	38.383
21	99	Tommy Joe Martins	B. J. McLeod Motorsports	Toyota	38.470
22	08	Gray Gaulding (R)	SS-Green Light Racing	Chevrolet	38.594
23	15	B. J. McLeod	JD Motorsports	Chevrolet	38.648
24	74	Kyle Weatherman	Mike Harmon Racing	Chevrolet	38.693
25	86	Brandon Brown	Brandonbilt Motorsports	Chevrolet	38.808
26	38	Jeff Green	RSS Racing	Chevrolet	38.808
27	66	Tyler Hill (i)	MBM Motorsports	Toyota	38.851
28	42	Chad Finchum	MBM Motorsports	Toyota	38.879
29	36	Josh Williams	DGM Racing	Chevrolet	38.899
30	18	Riley Herbst	Joe Gibbs Racing	Toyota	38.998
31	17	Bayley Currey (i)	Rick Ware Racing	Chevrolet	39.009
32	01	Stephen Leicht	JD Motorsports	Chevrolet	39.029
33	13	Timmy Hill	MBM Motorsports	Toyota	39.094
34	07	Ray Black Jr.	SS-Green Light Racing	Chevrolet	39.097
35	52	David Starr	Jimmy Means Racing	Chevrolet	39.619
36	35	Joey Gase	MBM Motorsports	Toyota	39.691
37	78	Vinnie Miller	B. J. McLeod Motorsports	Chevrolet	39.971
38	0	Garrett Smithley	JD Motorsports	Chevrolet	40.342
Did not qualify
39	21	Joe Graf Jr.	Richard Childress Racing	Chevrolet	39.154

== Race ==
=== Stage results ===
Stage One Laps: 30

Pos	No	Driver	Team	Manufacturer	Points
1	12	Paul Menard (i)	Team Penske	Ford	0
2	20	Christopher Bell	Joe Gibbs Racing	Toyota	9
3	2	Tyler Reddick	Richard Childress Racing	Chevrolet	8
4	23	John Hunter Nemechek (R)	GMS Racing	Chevrolet	7
5	9	Noah Gragson (R)	JR Motorsports	Chevrolet	6
6	22	Austin Cindric	Team Penske	Ford	5
7	7	Justin Allgaier	JR Motorsports	Chevrolet	4
8	00	Cole Custer	Stewart-Haas Racing with Biagi-DenBeste	Ford	3
9	1	Michael Annett	JR Motorsports	Chevrolet	2
10	11	Justin Haley (R)	Kaulig Racing	Chevrolet	1

Stage Two Laps: 30

Pos	No	Driver	Team	Manufacturer	Points
1	20	Christopher Bell	Joe Gibbs Racing	Toyota	10
2	00	Cole Custer	Stewart-Haas Racing with Biagi-DenBeste	Ford	9
3	12	Paul Menard (i)	Team Penske	Ford	0
4	2	Tyler Reddick	Richard Childress Racing	Chevrolet	7
5	11	Justin Haley (R)	Kaulig Racing	Chevrolet	6
6	23	John Hunter Nemechek (R)	GMS Racing	Chevrolet	5
7	7	Justin Allgaier	JR Motorsports	Chevrolet	4
8	1	Michael Annett	JR Motorsports	Chevrolet	3
9	19	Brandon Jones	Joe Gibbs Racing	Toyota	2
10	9	Noah Gragson (R)	JR Motorsports	Chevrolet	1

=== Final stage results ===
Stage Three Laps: 65

Pos	Grid	No	Driver	Team	Manufacturer	Laps	Points
1	10	2	Tyler Reddick	Richard Childress Racing	Chevrolet	125	55
2	4	9	Noah Gragson (R)	JR Motorsports	Chevrolet	125	42
3	7	1	Michael Annett	JR Motorsports	Chevrolet	125	39
4	1	12	Paul Menard (i)	Team Penske	Ford	125	0
5	12	7	Justin Allgaier	JR Motorsports	Chevrolet	125	40
6	3	19	Brandon Jones	Joe Gibbs Racing	Toyota	125	33
7	14	98	Chase Briscoe (R)	Stewart-Haas Racing with Biagi-DenBeste	Ford	125	30
8	8	23	John Hunter Nemechek (R)	GMS Racing	Chevrolet	125	41
9	11	8	Jeb Burton	JR Motorsports	Chevrolet	125	28
10	13	11	Justin Haley (R)	Kaulig Racing	Chevrolet	125	34
11	5	22	Austin Cindric	Team Penske	Ford	125	31
12	6	00	Cole Custer	Stewart-Haas Racing with Biagi-DenBeste	Ford	125	37
13	2	20	Christopher Bell	Joe Gibbs Racing	Toyota	125	43
14	15	4	Ross Chastain (i)	JD Motorsports	Chevrolet	125	0
15	17	51	Jeremy Clements	Jeremy Clements Racing	Chevrolet	125	22
16	22	08	Gray Gaulding	SS-Green Light Racing	Chevrolet	125	21
17	9	39	Ryan Sieg	RSS Racing	Chevrolet	124	20
18	21	99	Tommy Joe Martins	B. J. McLeod Motorsports	Chevrolet	124	19
19	23	15	B. J. McLeod	JD Motorsports	Chevrolet	124	18
20	32	01	Stephen Leicht (R)	JD Motorsports	Chevrolet	124	17
21	20	93	Josh Bilicki	RSS Racing	Chevrolet	124	16
22	28	42	Chad Finchum	MBM Motorsports	Toyota	124	15
23	29	36	Josh Williams (R)	DGM Racing	Chevrolet	124	14
24	18	5	Matt Mills (R)	B. J. McLeod Motorsports	Chevrolet	124	13
25	35	52	David Starr	Jimmy Means Racing	Chevrolet	124	12
26	25	86	Brandon Brown	Brandonbilt Motorsports	Chevrolet	124	11
27	38	0	Garrett Smithley	JD Motorsports	Chevrolet	123	10
28	37	78	Vinnie Miller	B. J. McLeod Motorsports	Chevrolet	123	9
29	36	35	Joey Gase	MBM Motorsports	Toyota	64	8
30	34	07	Ray Black Jr.	SS-Green Light Racing	Chevrolet	51	7
31	33	13	Timmy Hill	MBM Motorsports	Toyota	42	6
32	16	89	Landon Cassill	Shepherd Racing Ventures	Chevrolet	40	5
33	31	17	Bayley Currey (i)	Rick Ware Racing	Chevrolet	36	0
34	24	74	Kyle Weatherman	Mike Harmon Racing	Chevrolet	29	3
35	27	66	Tyler Hill (i)	MBM Motorsports	Toyota	17	0
36	26	38	Jeff Green	RSS Racing	Chevrolet	17	1
37	30	18	Riley Herbst	Joe Gibbs Racing	Toyota	12	1
38	19	90	Dillon Bassett	DGM Racing	Chevrolet	8	1

Previous race: 2019 Pocono Green 250	NASCAR Xfinity Series; 2019 season	Next race: 2019 CircuitCity.com 250
