= 2020 LS Tractor 200 =

NASCAR Xfinity Series race

Race details
- Race 4 of 33 in the 2020 NASCAR Xfinity Series season
- Date: March 7, 2020
- Location: Phoenix Raceway in Avondale, Arizona
- Course: Permanent racing facility
- Course length: 1 miles (1.609 km)
- Distance: 200 laps, 200 mi (320 km)

Pole position
| Driver | Kyle Busch | Joe Gibbs Racing |
- Time: 26.869

Most laps led
| Driver | Kyle Busch | Joe Gibbs Racing |
- Laps: 78

Winner
| No. 19 | Brandon Jones | Joe Gibbs Racing |

Television in the United States
- Network: FS1
- Announcers: Adam Alexander, Clint Bowyer, and Joey Logano

Radio in the United States
- Radio: MRN
- Booth announcers: Kurt Becker and Dan Hubbard
- Turn announcers: Dillon Welch (1 & 2) and Jeff Striegle (3 & 4)

The 2020 LS Tractor 200 was a NASCAR Xfinity Series race held on March 7, 2020 at Phoenix Raceway in Avondale, Arizona. Contested over 200 laps on the 1-mile (1.6 km) asphalt oval, it was the fourth race of the 2020 NASCAR Xfinity Series season. Brandon Jones won his first race of the 2020 season, and the first of his career at Phoenix Raceway.

This was the last race to run before the season was put on hold due to the COVID-19 pandemic.

== Report ==
=== Background ===
Phoenix Raceway is a 1.022 mi (1.645 km), low-banked tri-oval race track located in Avondale, Arizona. The motorsport track opened in 1964 and currently hosts two NASCAR race weekends annually. PIR has also hosted the IndyCar Series, CART, USAC and the Rolex Sports Car Series. The raceway is currently owned and operated by International Speedway Corporation.

=== Entry list ===
- (R) denotes rookie driver.
- (i) denotes driver who is ineligible for series driver points.

| No. | Driver | Team | Manufacturer |
|---|---|---|---|
| 0 | B. J. McLeod | JD Motorsports | Chevrolet |
| 1 | Michael Annett | JR Motorsports | Chevrolet |
| 02 | Brett Moffitt (i) | Our Motorsports | Chevrolet |
| 4 | Jesse Little (R) | JD Motorsports | Chevrolet |
| 5 | Matt Mills | B. J. McLeod Motorsports | Chevrolet |
| 6 | David Starr | JD Motorsports | Chevrolet |
| 7 | Justin Allgaier | JR Motorsports | Chevrolet |
| 07 | Ray Black Jr. | SS-Green Light Racing | Chevrolet |
| 8 | Daniel Hemric | JR Motorsports | Chevrolet |
| 08 | Joe Graf Jr. (R) | SS-Green Light Racing | Chevrolet |
| 9 | Noah Gragson | JR Motorsports | Chevrolet |
| 10 | Ross Chastain | Kaulig Racing | Chevrolet |
| 11 | Justin Haley | Kaulig Racing | Chevrolet |
| 12 | Brad Keselowski (i) | Team Penske | Ford |
| 13 | Chad Finchum | MBM Motorsports | Toyota |
| 15 | Colby Howard | JD Motorsports | Chevrolet |
| 18 | Riley Herbst (R) | Joe Gibbs Racing | Toyota |
| 19 | Brandon Jones | Joe Gibbs Racing | Toyota |
| 20 | Harrison Burton (R) | Joe Gibbs Racing | Toyota |
| 21 | Myatt Snider | Richard Childress Racing | Chevrolet |
| 22 | Austin Cindric | Team Penske | Ford |
| 36 | Alex Labbé | DGM Racing | Chevrolet |
| 39 | Ryan Sieg | RSS Racing | Chevrolet |
| 44 | Tommy Joe Martins | Martins Motorsports | Chevrolet |
| 47 | Joe Nemechek (i) | Mike Harmon Racing | Chevrolet |
| 51 | Jeremy Clements | Jeremy Clements Racing | Chevrolet |
| 52 | Kody Vanderwal (R) | Means Racing | Chevrolet |
| 54 | Kyle Busch (i) | Joe Gibbs Racing | Toyota |
| 61 | Timmy Hill (i) | Hattori Racing | Toyota |
| 66 | Stephen Leicht | MBM Motorsports | Toyota |
| 68 | Brandon Brown | Brandonbilt Motorsports | Chevrolet |
| 74 | Bayley Currey (i) | Mike Harmon Racing | Chevrolet |
| 78 | Vinnie Miller | B. J. McLeod Motorsports | Chevrolet |
| 89 | Landon Cassill | Shepherd Racing | Chevrolet |
| 90 | Dillon Bassett | DGM Racing | Chevrolet |
| 92 | Josh Williams | DGM Racing | Chevrolet |
| 93 | Jeff Green | RSS Racing | Chevrolet |
| 98 | Chase Briscoe | Stewart-Haas Racing | Ford |
| 99 | J. J. Yeley | B. J. McLeod Motorsports | Chevrolet |
Official entry list

- Ray Black Jr. started from the rear due to unapproved adjustments.

== Practice ==
=== First practice ===
Ross Chastain was the fastest in the first practice session with a time of 27.563 seconds and a speed of 130.610 mph (210.196 km/h).

| Pos | No. | Driver | Team | Manufacturer | Time | Speed |
|---|---|---|---|---|---|---|
| 1 | 10 | Ross Chastain | Kaulig Racing | Chevrolet | 27.563 | 130.610 |
| 2 | 22 | Austin Cindric | Team Penske | Ford | 27.694 | 129.992 |
| 3 | 39 | Ryan Sieg | RSS Racing | Chevrolet | 27.696 | 129.983 |
Official first practice results

=== Final practice ===
Kyle Busch was the fastest in the final practice session with a time of 27.797 seconds and a speed of 129.510 mph (208.426 km/h).

| Pos | No. | Driver | Team | Manufacturer | Time | Speed |
|---|---|---|---|---|---|---|
| 1 | 54 | Kyle Busch (i) | Joe Gibbs Racing | Toyota | 27.797 | 129.510 |
| 2 | 7 | Justin Allgaier | JR Motorsports | Chevrolet | 27.814 | 129.431 |
| 3 | 22 | Austin Cindric | Team Penske | Ford | 27.967 | 128.723 |
Official final practice results

== Qualifying ==
Kyle Busch scored the pole position with a time of 26.869 seconds and a speed of 133.983 mph (215.625 km/h).

=== Qualifying results ===
| Pos | No | Driver | Team | Manufacturer | Time |
|---|---|---|---|---|---|
| 1 | 54 | Kyle Busch (i) | Joe Gibbs Racing | Toyota | 26.869 |
| 2 | 22 | Austin Cindric | Team Penske | Ford | 26.933 |
| 3 | 20 | Harrison Burton (R) | Joe Gibbs Racing | Toyota | 26.967 |
| 4 | 12 | Brad Keselowski (i) | Team Penske | Ford | 26.991 |
| 5 | 10 | Ross Chastain | Kaulig Racing | Chevrolet | 26.995 |
| 6 | 7 | Justin Allgaier | JR Motorsports | Chevrolet | 26.997 |
| 7 | 9 | Noah Gragson | JR Motorsports | Chevrolet | 27.000 |
| 8 | 19 | Brandon Jones | Joe Gibbs Racing | Toyota | 27.011 |
| 9 | 98 | Chase Briscoe | Stewart-Haas Racing | Ford | 27.143 |
| 10 | 39 | Ryan Sieg | RSS Racing | Chevrolet | 27.143 |
| 11 | 18 | Riley Herbst (R) | Joe Gibbs Racing | Toyota | 27.197 |
| 12 | 8 | Daniel Hemric | JR Motorsports | Chevrolet | 27.207 |
| 13 | 68 | Brandon Brown | Brandonbilt Motorsports | Chevrolet | 27.310 |
| 14 | 11 | Justin Haley | Kaulig Racing | Chevrolet | 27.311 |
| 15 | 21 | Myatt Snider | Richard Childress Racing | Chevrolet | 27.383 |
| 16 | 89 | Landon Cassill | Shepherd Racing | Chevrolet | 27.394 |
| 17 | 02 | Brett Moffitt (i) | Our Motorsports | Chevrolet | 27.409 |
| 18 | 51 | Jeremy Clements | Jeremy Clements Racing | Chevrolet | 27.411 |
| 19 | 08 | Joe Graf Jr. (R) | SS-Green Light Racing | Chevrolet | 27.510 |
| 20 | 90 | Dillon Bassett | DGM Racing | Chevrolet | 27.524 |
| 21 | 0 | B. J. McLeod | JD Motorsports | Chevrolet | 27.535 |
| 22 | 36 | Alex Labbé | DGM Racing | Chevrolet | 27.536 |
| 23 | 07 | Ray Black Jr. | SS-Green Light Racing | Chevrolet | 27.546 |
| 24 | 92 | Josh Williams | DGM Racing | Chevrolet | 27.594 |
| 25 | 66 | Stephen Leicht | MBM Motorsports | Toyota | 27.654 |
| 26 | 1 | Michael Annett | JR Motorsports | Chevrolet | 27.671 |
| 27 | 47 | Joe Nemechek (i) | Mike Harmon Racing | Chevrolet | 27.676 |
| 28 | 44 | Tommy Joe Martins | Martins Motorsports | Chevrolet | 27.692 |
| 29 | 93 | Jeff Green | RSS Racing | Chevrolet | 27.717 |
| 30 | 61 | Timmy Hill (i) | Hattori Racing | Toyota | 27.723 |
| 31 | 13 | Chad Finchum | MBM Motorsports | Toyota | 27.806 |
| 32 | 6 | David Starr | JD Motorsports | Chevrolet | 27.902 |
| 33 | 4 | Jesse Little (R) | JD Motorsports | Chevrolet | 27.939 |
| 34 | 15 | Colby Howard | JD Motorsports | Chevrolet | 27.992 |
| 35 | 78 | Vinnie Miller | B. J. McLeod Motorsports | Chevrolet | 28.516 |
| 36 | 52 | Kody Vanderwal | Means Racing | Chevrolet | 28.710 |
Did not qualify
| 37 | 99 | J. J. Yeley | B. J. McLeod Motorsports | Chevrolet | 27.815 |
| 38 | 5 | Matt Mills | B. J. McLeod Motorsports | Chevrolet | 27.849 |
| 39 | 74 | Bayley Currey (i) | Mike Harmon Racing | Chevrolet | 28.149 |
Official qualifying results

== Race ==
=== Race results ===
==== Stage Results ====
Stage One

Laps: 45

| Pos | No | Driver | Team | Manufacturer | Points |
|---|---|---|---|---|---|
| 1 | 7 | Justin Allgaier | JR Motorsports | Chevrolet | 10 |
| 2 | 10 | Ross Chastain | Kaulig Racing | Chevrolet | 9 |
| 3 | 98 | Chase Briscoe | Stewart-Haas Racing | Ford | 8 |
| 4 | 54 | Kyle Busch (i) | Joe Gibbs Racing | Toyota | 0 |
| 5 | 22 | Austin Cindric | Team Penske | Ford | 6 |
| 6 | 9 | Noah Gragson | JR Motorsports | Chevrolet | 5 |
| 7 | 12 | Brad Keselowski (i) | Team Penske | Ford | 0 |
| 8 | 11 | Justin Haley | Kaulig Racing | Chevrolet | 3 |
| 9 | 20 | Harrison Burton (R) | Joe Gibbs Racing | Toyota | 2 |
| 10 | 19 | Brandon Jones | Joe Gibbs Racing | Toyota | 1 |

Stage Two

Laps: 45

| Pos | No | Driver | Team | Manufacturer | Points |
|---|---|---|---|---|---|
| 1 | 9 | Noah Gragson | JR Motorsports | Chevrolet | 10 |
| 2 | 10 | Ross Chastain | Kaulig Racing | Chevrolet | 9 |
| 3 | 98 | Chase Briscoe | Stewart-Haas Racing | Ford | 8 |
| 4 | 54 | Kyle Busch (i) | Joe Gibbs Racing | Toyota | 0 |
| 5 | 7 | Justin Allgaier | JR Motorsports | Chevrolet | 6 |
| 6 | 39 | Ryan Sieg | RSS Racing | Chevrolet | 5 |
| 7 | 19 | Brandon Jones | Joe Gibbs Racing | Toyota | 4 |
| 8 | 20 | Harrison Burton (R) | Joe Gibbs Racing | Toyota | 3 |
| 9 | 22 | Austin Cindric | Team Penske | Ford | 2 |
| 10 | 68 | Brandon Brown | Brandonbilt Motorsports | Chevrolet | 1 |

=== Final Stage Results ===
Laps: 110

| Pos | Grid | No | Driver | Team | Manufacturer | Laps | Points | Status |
|---|---|---|---|---|---|---|---|---|
| 1 | 8 | 19 | Brandon Jones | Joe Gibbs Racing | Toyota | 200 | 45 | Running |
| 2 | 3 | 20 | Harrison Burton (R) | Joe Gibbs Racing | Toyota | 200 | 40 | Running |
| 3 | 1 | 54 | Kyle Busch (i) | Joe Gibbs Racing | Toyota | 200 | 0 | Running |
| 4 | 4 | 12 | Brad Keselowski | Team Penske | Ford | 200 | 0 | Running |
| 5 | 14 | 11 | Justin Haley | Kaulig Racing | Chevrolet | 200 | 35 | Running |
| 6 | 9 | 98 | Chase Briscoe | Stewart-Haas Racing | Ford | 200 | 47 | Running |
| 7 | 7 | 9 | Noah Gragson | JR Motorsports | Chevrolet | 200 | 45 | Running |
| 8 | 2 | 22 | Austin Cindric | Team Penske | Ford | 200 | 37 | Running |
| 9 | 5 | 10 | Ross Chastain | Kaulig Racing | Chevrolet | 200 | 46 | Running |
| 10 | 11 | 18 | Riley Herbst (R) | Joe Gibbs Racing | Toyota | 200 | 27 | Running |
| 11 | 10 | 39 | Ryan Sieg | RSS Racing | Chevrolet | 200 | 31 | Running |
| 12 | 13 | 68 | Brandon Brown | Brandonbilt Motorsports | Chevrolet | 200 | 26 | Running |
| 13 | 6 | 7 | Justin Allgaier | JR Motorsports | Chevrolet | 200 | 40 | Running |
| 14 | 15 | 21 | Myatt Snider | Richard Childress Racing | Chevrolet | 200 | 23 | Running |
| 15 | 29 | 93 | Jeff Green | RSS Racing | Chevrolet | 200 | 22 | Running |
| 16 | 24 | 92 | Josh Williams | DGM Racing | Chevrolet | 200 | 21 | Running |
| 17 | 26 | 1 | Michael Annett | JR Motorsports | Chevrolet | 200 | 20 | Running |
| 18 | 20 | 90 | Dillon Bassett | DGM Racing | Chevrolet | 199 | 19 | Running |
| 19 | 17 | 02 | Brett Moffitt (i) | Our Motorsports | Chevrolet | 199 | 0 | Running |
| 20 | 21 | 0 | B. J. McLeod | JD Motorsports | Chevrolet | 199 | 17 | Running |
| 21 | 33 | 4 | Jesse Little (R) | JD Motorsports | Chevrolet | 199 | 16 | Running |
| 22 | 22 | 36 | Alex Labbé | DGM Racing | Chevrolet | 199 | 15 | Running |
| 23 | 30 | 61 | Timmy Hill (i) | Hattori Racing | Toyota | 198 | 0 | Running |
| 24 | 31 | 13 | Chad Finchum | MBM Motorsports | Toyota | 196 | 13 | Running |
| 25 | 23 | 07 | Ray Black Jr. | SS-Green Light Racing | Chevrolet | 196 | 12 | Running |
| 26 | 32 | 6 | David Starr | JD Motorsports | Chevrolet | 196 | 11 | Running |
| 27 | 35 | 78 | Vinnie Miller | B. J. McLeod Motorsports | Chevrolet | 196 | 10 | Running |
| 28 | 28 | 44 | Tommy Joe Martins | Martins Motorsports | Chevrolet | 194 | 9 | Running |
| 29 | 36 | 52 | Kody Vanderwal (R) | Means Racing | Chevrolet | 177 | 8 | Running |
| 30 | 12 | 8 | Daniel Hemric | JR Motorsports | Chevrolet | 142 | 7 | DVP |
| 31 | 19 | 08 | Joe Graf Jr. (R) | SS-Green Light Racing | Chevrolet | 142 | 6 | Accident |
| 32 | 27 | 47 | Joe Nemechek (i) | Mike Harmon Racing | Chevrolet | 127 | 0 | Accident |
| 33 | 25 | 66 | Stephen Leicht | MBM Motorsports | Toyota | 101 | 4 | Clutch |
| 34 | 34 | 15 | Colby Howard | JD Motorsports | Chevrolet | 81 | 3 | Accident |
| 35 | 16 | 89 | Landon Cassill | Shepherd Racing | Chevrolet | 63 | 2 | Vibration |
| 36 | 18 | 51 | Jeremy Clements | Jeremy Clements Racing | Chevrolet | 58 | 1 | Engine |
Official race results

=== Race statistics ===
- Lead changes: 12 among 7 different drivers
- Cautions/Laps: 7 for 45
- Red flags: 0
- Time of race: 2 hours, 9 minutes, 47 seconds
- Average speed: 92.462 mph (148.803 km/h)

== Media ==
=== Television ===
The LS Tractor 200 was carried by FS1 in the United States. Adam Alexander, Stewart-Haas Racing driver Clint Bowyer, and Team Penske driver Joey Logano called the race from the booth, with Jamie Little and Vince Welch covering pit road.

FS1
| Booth announcers | Pit reporters |
|---|---|
| Lap-by-lap: Adam Alexander Color-commentator: Clint Bowyer Color-commentator: Joey Logano | Jamie Little Vince Welch |

=== Radio ===
The Motor Racing Network (MRN) called the race for radio, which was simulcast on SiriusXM NASCAR Radio. Kurt Becker and Dan Hubbard anchored the action from the booth. Dillon Welch called the action from Turns 1 & 2 and Jeff Striegle called the race through turns 3 & 4. Steve Post and Kim Coon provided reports from pit road.

MRN Radio
| Booth announcers | Turn announcers | Pit reporters |
|---|---|---|
| Lead announcer: Kurt Becker Announcer: Dan Hubbard | Turns 1 & 2: Dillon Welch Turns 3 & 4: Jeff Striegle | Steve Post Kim Coon |

== Standings after the race ==
Drivers' Championship standings

| | Pos | Driver | Points |
|---|---|---|---|
| | 1 | Harrison Burton (R) | 176 |
| | 2 | Chase Briscoe | 173 (-3) |
| | 3 | Austin Cindric | 155 (-21) |
| 2 | 4 | Brandon Jones | 148 (-28) |
| 2 | 5 | Ross Chastain | 146 (-30) |
| 3 | 6 | Noah Gragson | 143 (-33) |
| 3 | 7 | Ryan Sieg | 143 (-33) |
| 3 | 8 | Justin Haley | 140 (-36) |
| 1 | 9 | Justin Allgaier | 138 (-38) |
| 2 | 10 | Michael Annett | 119 (-57) |
| | 11 | Riley Herbst (R) | 109 (-67) |
| 1 | 12 | Brandon Brown | 91 (-85) |
Official driver's standings

Note: Only the first 12 positions are included for the driver standings.

| Previous race: 2020 Production Alliance Group 300 | NASCAR Xfinity Series; 2020 season | Next race: 2020 Toyota 200 |
