= 2021 Tennessee Lottery 250 =

Race details
- Race 15 of 33 in the 2021 NASCAR Xfinity Series season
- Date: June 19, 2021
- Location: Nashville Superspeedway in Lebanon, Tennessee
- Course: Permanent racing facility
- Course length: 1.333 miles (2.145 km)
- Distance: 189 laps, 251.937 mi (405.453 km)
- Scheduled distance: 188 laps, 250.604 mi (403.308 km)
- Average speed: 107.118 miles per hour (172.390 km/h)

Pole position
Driver	Kyle Busch	Joe Gibbs Racing
- Time: 30.420

Most laps led
Driver	Kyle Busch	Joe Gibbs Racing
- Laps: 122

Winner
No. 54	Kyle Busch	Joe Gibbs Racing

Television in the United States
- Network: NBCSN
- Announcers: Rick Allen, Jeff Burton, Steve Letarte, and Dale Earnhardt Jr.

The 2021 Tennessee Lottery 250 was a NASCAR Xfinity Series race held on June 19, 2021. It was contested over 189 laps—extended from 188 laps due to an overtime finish—on the 1.333-mile (2.145 km) Nashville Superspeedway. It was the fifteenth race of the 2021 NASCAR Xfinity Series season. Joe Gibbs Racing driver Kyle Busch, collected his third win of the season. Busch also became the first driver in NASCAR Xfinity series history to win 100 races.

== Report ==
=== Background ===
Nashville Superspeedway is a motor racing complex located in Gladeville, Tennessee (though the track has a Lebanon address), United States, about 30 miles (48 km) southeast of Nashville. The track was built in 2001 and is currently used for events, driving schools and GT Academy, a reality television competition. It is a concrete oval track 1 1/3 miles (2.145 km) long. Nashville Superspeedway is owned by Dover Motorsports, Inc., which also owns Dover International Speedway. Nashville Superspeedway was the longest concrete oval in NASCAR during the time it was on the Xfinity series and NASCAR Camping World Truck Series circuits. Current permanent seating capacity is approximately 25,000. Additional portable seats are brought in for some events, and seating capacity can be expanded to 150,000. Infrastructure is in place to expand the facility to include a short track, drag strip, and road course.

=== Entry list ===
- (R) denotes rookie driver.
- (i) denotes driver who is ineligible for series driver points.

No.	Driver	Team	Manufacturer
0	Jeffrey Earnhardt	JD Motorsports	Chevrolet
1	Michael Annett	JR Motorsports	Chevrolet
2	Myatt Snider	Richard Childress Racing	Chevrolet
02	Brett Moffitt	Our Motorsports	Chevrolet
4	Landon Cassill	JD Motorsports	Chevrolet
5	Matt Mills	B. J. McLeod Motorsports	Chevrolet
6	Ryan Vargas (R)	JD Motorsports	Chevrolet
7	Justin Allgaier	JR Motorsports	Chevrolet
07	J. J. Yeley	SS-Green Light Racing	Chevrolet
8	Josh Berry (R)	JR Motorsports	Chevrolet
9	Noah Gragson	JR Motorsports	Chevrolet
10	Jeb Burton	Kaulig Racing	Chevrolet
11	Justin Haley	Kaulig Racing	Chevrolet
13	Timmy Hill	MBM Motorsports	Toyota
15	Colby Howard	JD Motorsports	Chevrolet
16	A. J. Allmendinger	Kaulig Racing	Chevrolet
17	Joe Graf Jr.	SS-Green Light Racing with Rick Ware Racing	Chevrolet
18	Daniel Hemric	Joe Gibbs Racing	Toyota
19	Brandon Jones	Joe Gibbs Racing	Toyota
20	Harrison Burton	Joe Gibbs Racing	Toyota
22	Austin Cindric	Team Penske	Ford
23	Natalie Decker	Our Motorsports	Chevrolet
26	Will Rodgers	Sam Hunt Racing	Toyota
31	Tyler Reddick (i)	Jordan Anderson Racing	Chevrolet
36	Alex Labbé	DGM Racing	Chevrolet
39	Ryan Sieg	RSS Racing	Ford
42	Chad Finchum	MBM Motorsports	Toyota
44	Tommy Joe Martins	Martins Motorsports	Chevrolet
47	Kyle Weatherman	Mike Harmon Racing	Chevrolet
48	Jade Buford (R)	Big Machine Racing Team	Chevrolet
51	Jeremy Clements	Jeremy Clements Racing	Chevrolet
52	Gray Gaulding	Means Racing	Chevrolet
54	Kyle Busch (i)	Joe Gibbs Racing	Toyota
61	Austin Hill (i)	Hattori Racing Enterprises	Toyota
66	David Starr	MBM Motorsports	Toyota
68	Brandon Brown	Brandonbilt Motorsports	Chevrolet
74	Bayley Currey (i)	Mike Harmon Racing	Chevrolet
78	Jesse Little	B. J. McLeod Motorsports	Toyota
90	Dillon Bassett	DGM Racing	Chevrolet
92	Josh Williams	DGM Racing	Chevrolet
98	Riley Herbst	Stewart-Haas Racing	Ford
99	Stefan Parsons	B. J. McLeod Motorsports	Toyota
Official entry list

== Practice ==
Kyle Busch was the fastest in the first practice session with a time of 30.746 seconds and a speed of 155.728 mph (250.620 km/h).

Pos	No.	Driver	Team	Manufacturer	Time	Speed
1	54	Kyle Busch (i)	Joe Gibbs Racing	Toyota	30.746	155.728
2	20	Harrison Burton	Joe Gibbs Racing	Toyota	30.978	154.561
3	16	A. J. Allmendinger	Kaulig Racing	Chevrolet	30.998	154.462
Official first practice results

== Qualifying ==
Kyle Busch scored the pole position after a time of 30.420 seconds and a speed of 157.396 mph (253.304 km/h).

=== Qualifying results ===
Pos	No	Driver	Team	Manufacturer	Time
1	54	Kyle Busch (i)	Joe Gibbs Racing	Toyota	30.420
2	22	Austin Cindric	Team Penske	Ford	30.556
3	20	Harrison Burton	Joe Gibbs Racing	Toyota	30.571
4	18	Daniel Hemric	Joe Gibbs Racing	Toyota	30.718
5	16	A. J. Allmendinger	Kaulig Racing	Chevrolet	30.722
6	10	Jeb Burton	Kaulig Racing	Chevrolet	30.726
7	19	Brandon Jones	Joe Gibbs Racing	Toyota	30.742
8	2	Myatt Snider	Richard Childress Racing	Chevrolet	30.752
9	48	Jade Buford (R)	Big Machine Racing Team	Chevrolet	30.807
10	9	Noah Gragson	JR Motorsports	Chevrolet	30.867
11	7	Justin Allgaier	JR Motorsports	Chevrolet	30.897
12	11	Justin Haley	Kaulig Racing	Chevrolet	30.910
13	39	Ryan Sieg	RSS Racing	Ford	30.937
14	26	Will Rodgers	Sam Hunt Racing	Toyota	30.943
15	61	Austin Hill (i)	Hattori Racing Enterprises	Toyota	30.995
16	68	Brandon Brown	Brandonbilt Motorsports	Chevrolet	31.003
17	31	Tyler Reddick (i)	Jordan Anderson Racing	Chevrolet	31.007
18	02	Brett Moffitt	Our Motorsports	Chevrolet	31.080
19	44	Tommy Joe Martins	Martins Motorsports	Chevrolet	31.092
20	98	Riley Herbst	Stewart-Haas Racing	Ford	31.106
21	1	Michael Annett	JR Motorsports	Chevrolet	31.110
22	8	Josh Berry (R)	JR Motorsports	Chevrolet	31.138
23	51	Jeremy Clements	Jeremy Clements Racing	Chevrolet	31.153
24	99	Stefan Parsons	B. J. McLeod Motorsports	Toyota	31.163
25	4	Landon Cassill	JD Motorsports	Chevrolet	31.217
26	92	Josh Williams	DGM Racing	Chevrolet	31.252
27	47	Kyle Weatherman	Mike Harmon Racing	Chevrolet	31.363
28	6	Ryan Vargas (R)	JD Motorsports	Chevrolet	31.370
29	36	Alex Labbé	DGM Racing	Chevrolet	31.379
30	74	Bayley Currey (i)	Mike Harmon Racing	Chevrolet	31.407
31	07	J. J. Yeley	SS-Green Light Racing	Chevrolet	31.477
32	5	Matt Mills	B. J. McLeod Motorsports	Chevrolet	31.568
33	17	Joe Graf Jr.	SS-Green Light Racing with Rick Ware Racing	Chevrolet	31.633
34	66	David Starr	MBM Motorsports	Toyota	31.647
35	78	Jesse Little	B. J. McLeod Motorsports	Toyota	31.841
36	23	Natalie Decker	Our Motorsports	Chevrolet	31.987
Did not qualify
37	42	Chad Finchum	MBM Motorsports	Toyota	31.543
38	13	Timmy Hill (i)	MBM Motorsports	Toyota	31.553
39	0	Jeffrey Earnhardt	JD Motorsports	Chevrolet	31.568
40	15	Colby Howard	JD Motorsports	Chevrolet	31.591
41	90	Dillon Bassett	DGM Racing	Chevrolet	31.851
42	52	Gray Gaulding	Means Motorsports	Chevrolet	32.350
Official qualifying results

== Race ==
=== Race results ===
==== Stage Results ====
Stage One Laps: 45

Pos	No	Driver	Team	Manufacturer	Points
1	22	Austin Cindric	Team Penske	Ford	10
2	54	Kyle Busch (i)	Joe Gibbs Racing	Toyota	0
3	18	Daniel Hemric	Joe Gibbs Racing	Toyota	8
4	20	Harrison Burton	Joe Gibbs Racing	Toyota	7
5	7	Justin Allgaier	JR Motorsports	Chevrolet	6
6	19	Brandon Jones	Joe Gibbs Racing	Toyota	5
7	16	A. J. Allmendinger	Kaulig Racing	Chevrolet	4
8	10	Jeb Burton	Kaulig Racing	Chevrolet	3
9	8	Josh Berry (R)	JR Motorsports	Chevrolet	2
10	2	Myatt Snider	Richard Childress Racing	Chevrolet	1

Stage Two Laps: 45

Pos	No	Driver	Team	Manufacturer	Points
1	54	Kyle Busch (i)	Joe Gibbs Racing	Toyota	0
2	7	Justin Allgaier	JR Motorsports	Chevrolet	9
3	18	Daniel Hemric	Joe Gibbs Racing	Toyota	8
4	20	Harrison Burton	Joe Gibbs Racing	Toyota	7
5	1	Michael Annett	JR Motorsports	Chevrolet	6
6	8	Josh Berry (R)	JR Motorsports	Chevrolet	5
7	19	Brandon Jones	Joe Gibbs Racing	Toyota	4
8	22	Austin Cindric	Team Penske	Ford	3
9	11	Justin Haley	Kaulig Racing	Chevrolet	9
10	9	Noah Gragson	JR Motorsports	Chevrolet	1

=== Final Stage Results ===
Laps: 98

Pos	Grid	No	Driver	Team	Manufacturer	Laps	Points	Status
1	1	54	Kyle Busch (R)	Joe Gibbs Racing	Toyota	189	0	Running
2	11	7	Justin Allgaier	JR Motorsports	Chevrolet	189	50	Running
3	3	20	Harrison Burton	Joe Gibbs Racing	Toyota	189	48	Running
4	22	8	Josh Berry (R)	JR Motorsports	Chevrolet	189	40	Running
5	5	16	A. J. Allmendinger	Kaulig Racing	Chevrolet	189	36	Running
6	7	19	Brandon Jones	Joe Gibbs Racing	Toyota	189	40	Running
7	6	10	Jeb Burton	Kaulig Racing	Chevrolet	189	33	Running
8	10	9	Noah Gragson	JR Motorsports	Chevrolet	189	30	Running
9	15	61	Austin Hill (i)	Hattori Racing Enterprises	Toyota	189	0	Running
10	20	98	Riley Herbst	Stewart-Haas Racing	Ford	189	27	Running
11	23	51	Jeremy Clements	Jeremy Clements Racing	Chevrolet	189	26	Running
12	21	1	Michael Annett	JR Motorsports	Chevrolet	189	31	Running
13	4	18	Daniel Hemric	Joe Gibbs Racing	Toyota	189	40	Running
14	14	26	Will Rodgers	Sam Hunt Racing	Toyota	189	23	Running
15	17	31	Tyler Reddick (i)	Jordan Anderson Racing	Chevrolet	189	0	Running
16	13	39	Ryan Sieg	RSS Racing	Ford	189	21	Running
17	29	36	Alex Labbé	DGM Racing	Chevrolet	189	20	Running
18	28	6	Ryan Vargas (R)	JD Motorsports	Chevrolet	189	19	Running
19	12	11	Justin Haley	Kaulig Racing	Chevrolet	189	20	Running
20	19	44	Tommy Joe Martins	Martins Motorsports	Chevrolet	189	17	Running
21	26	92	Josh Williams	DGM Racing	Chevrolet	189	16	Running
22	31	07	J. J. Yeley	JD Motorsports	Chevrolet	189	15	Running
23	18	02	Brett Moffitt	Our Motorsports	Chevrolet	188	14	Running
24	34	66	David Starr	MBM Motorsports	Toyota	187	13	Running
25	32	5	Matt Mills	B. J. McLeod Motorsports	Chevrolet	187	12	Running
26	36	23	Natalie Decker	Our Motorsports	Chevrolet	187	11	Running
27	35	78	Jesse Little	B. J. McLeod Motorsports	Toyota	187	10	Running
28	27	47	Kyle Weatherman	Mike Harmon Racing	Chevrolet	187	9	Running
29	25	4	Landon Cassill	JD Motorsports	Chevrolet	182	8	Accident
30	30	74	Bayley Currey (i)	Mike Harmon Racing	Chevrolet	177	0	Running
31	8	2	Myatt Snider	Richard Childress Racing	Chevrolet	165	7	Running
32	2	22	Austin Cindric	Team Penske	Ford	160	18	Accident
33	9	48	Jade Buford (R)	Big Machine Racing Team	Chevrolet	153	4	Accident
34	33	17	Joe Graf Jr.	SS-Green Light Racing	Chevrolet	152	3	Accident
35	16	68	Brandon Brown	Brandonbilt Motorsports	Chevrolet	140	2	Brakes
36	24	99	Stefan Parsons	B. J. McLeod Motorsports	Toyota	69	1	Accident
Official race results

=== Race statistics ===
- Lead changes: 12 among 5 different drivers
- Cautions/Laps: 8 for 46
- Time of race: 2 hours, 20 minutes, and 48 seconds
- Average speed: 107.118 mph (172.390 km/h)

Previous race: 2021 Alsco Uniforms 250	NASCAR Xfinity Series; 2021 season	Next race: 2021 Pocono Green 225
