= 2021 Alsco Uniforms 300 (Charlotte) =

Race details
- Race 12 of 33 in the 2021 NASCAR Xfinity Series season
- Date: May 29, 2021
- Location: Charlotte Motor Speedway in Concord, North Carolina
- Course: Permanent racing facility
- Course length: 1.50 miles (2.41 km)
- Distance: 200 laps, 300.00 mi (482.80 km)
- Average speed: 112.535 mph

Pole position
Driver	Riley Herbst	Stewart-Haas Racing
- Time: 29.350

Most laps led
Driver	Daniel Hemric	Joe Gibbs Racing
- Laps: 105

Winner
No. 54	Ty Gibbs	Joe Gibbs Racing

Television in the United States
- Network: FS1
- Announcers: Kevin Harvick, Ryan Blaney, and Joey Logano

The 2021 Alsco Uniforms 300 was a NASCAR Xfinity Series race held on May 29, 2021. It was contested over 200 laps on the 1.5-mile (2.4 km) asphalt speedway. It was the twelfth race of the 2021 NASCAR Xfinity Series season. Joe Gibbs Racing driver Ty Gibbs, collected his second win of the season, and his career.

== Report ==
=== Background ===
The race was held at Charlotte Motor Speedway, located in Concord, North Carolina. The speedway complex includes a 1.5-mile (2.4 km) quad-oval track that was utilized for the race, as well as a dragstrip and a dirt track. The speedway was built in 1959 by Bruton Smith and is considered the home track for NASCAR with many race teams based in the Charlotte metropolitan area. The track is owned and operated by Speedway Motorsports Inc. (SMI) with Marcus G. Smith serving as track president.

=== Entry list ===
- (R) denotes rookie driver.
- (i) denotes driver who is ineligible for series driver points.

No.	Driver	Team	Manufacturer
0	Jeffrey Earnhardt	JD Motorsports	Chevrolet
1	Michael Annett	JR Motorsports	Chevrolet
2	Myatt Snider	Richard Childress Racing	Chevrolet
02	Brett Moffitt	Our Motorsports	Chevrolet
4	Ryan Vargas (R)	JD Motorsports	Chevrolet
5	Matt Mills	B. J. McLeod Motorsports	Chevrolet
6	Landon Cassill	JD Motorsports	Chevrolet
7	Justin Allgaier	JR Motorsports	Chevrolet
07	Joe Graf Jr.	SS-Green Light Racing	Chevrolet
8	Josh Berry (R)	JR Motorsports	Chevrolet
9	Noah Gragson	JR Motorsports	Chevrolet
10	Jeb Burton	Kaulig Racing	Chevrolet
11	Justin Haley	Kaulig Racing	Chevrolet
13	Chad Finchum	MBM Motorsports	Toyota
15	Colby Howard	JD Motorsports	Chevrolet
16	A. J. Allmendinger	Kaulig Racing	Chevrolet
17	Cody Ware	SS-Green Light Racing with Rick Ware Racing	Ford
18	Daniel Hemric	Joe Gibbs Racing	Toyota
19	Brandon Jones	Joe Gibbs Racing	Toyota
20	Harrison Burton	Joe Gibbs Racing	Toyota
22	Austin Cindric	Team Penske	Ford
23	Ty Dillon	Our Motorsports	Chevrolet
26	Grant Enfinger (i)	Sam Hunt Racing	Toyota
31	Tyler Reddick (i)	Jordan Anderson Racing	Chevrolet
36	Alex Labbé	DGM Racing	Chevrolet
39	Ryan Sieg	RSS Racing	Ford
44	Tommy Joe Martins	Martins Motorsports	Chevrolet
47	Kyle Weatherman	Mike Harmon Racing	Chevrolet
48	Jade Buford (R)	Big Machine Racing Team	Chevrolet
51	Jeremy Clements	Jeremy Clements Racing	Chevrolet
52	Gray Gaulding	Means Racing	Chevrolet
54	Ty Gibbs (R)	Joe Gibbs Racing	Toyota
61	David Starr	Hattori Racing Enterprises	Toyota
66	Timmy Hill (i)	MBM Motorsports	Toyota
68	Brandon Brown	Brandonbilt Motorsports	Chevrolet
74	Bayley Currey (i)	Mike Harmon Racing	Chevrolet
76	Stefan Parsons	B. J. McLeod Motorsports	Chevrolet
77	Dillon Bassett	Bassett Racing	Chevrolet
78	Jesse Little	B. J. McLeod Motorsports	Toyota
90	B. J. McLeod	DGM Racing	Ford
92	Josh Williams	DGM Racing	Chevrolet
98	Riley Herbst	Stewart-Haas Racing	Ford
99	Chase Briscoe	B. J. McLeod Motorsports	Ford
Official entry list

== Practice ==
Riley Herbst was the fastest in the first practice session with a time of 30.263 seconds and a speed of 178.436 mph (287.165 km/h).

Pos	No.	Driver	Team	Manufacturer	Time	Speed
1	98	Riley Herbst	Stewart-Haas Racing	Ford	30.263	178.436
2	18	Daniel Hemric	Joe Gibbs Racing	Toyota	30.281	178.330
3	16	A. J. Allmendinger	Kaulig Racing	Chevrolet	30.392	177.678
Official first practice results

== Qualifying ==
Riley Herbst scored the pole position after a time of 29.350 seconds and a speed of 183.986 mph (296.097 km/h).

=== Qualifying results ===
Pos	No	Driver	Team	Manufacturer	Time
1	98	Riley Herbst	Stewart-Haas Racing	Ford	29.350
2	99	Chase Briscoe (i)	B. J. McLeod Motorsports	Ford	29.727
3	18	Daniel Hemric	Joe Gibbs Racing	Toyota	29.814
4	22	Austin Cindric	Team Penske	Toyota	29.855
5	16	A. J. Allmendinger	Kaulig Racing	Chevrolet	30.068
6	51	Jeremy Clements	Jeremy Clements Racing	Chevrolet	30.097
7	2	Myatt Snider	Richard Childress Racing	Chevrolet	30.113
8	54	Ty Gibbs	Joe Gibbs Racing	Toyota	30.127
9	10	Jeb Burton	Kaulig Racing	Chevrolet	30.173
10	23	Ty Dillon	Our Motorsports	Chevrolet	20.207
11	11	Justin Haley	Kaulig Racing	Chevrolet	30.260
12	39	Ryan Sieg	RSS Racing	Ford	30.286
13	20	Harrison Burton	Joe Gibbs Racing	Toyota	30.291
14	19	Brandon Jones	Joe Gibbs Racing	Toyota	30.304
15	02	Brett Moffitt	Our Motorsports	Chevrolet	30.317
16	31	Tyler Reddick (i)	Jordan Anderson Racing	Chevrolet	30.374
17	0	Jeffrey Earnhardt	JD Motorsports	Chevrolet	30.380
18	8	Josh Berry (R)	JR Motorsports	Chevrolet	30.383
19	1	Michael Annett	JR Motorsports	Chevrolet	30.465
20	4	Ryan Vargas	JD Motorsports	Chevrolet	30.523
21	76	Stefan Parsons	B. J. McLeod Motorsports	Chevrolet	30.524
22	13	Chad Finchum	MBM Motorsports	Toyota	30.525
23	9	Noah Gragson	JR Motorsports	Chevrolet	30.527
24	5	Matt Mills	B. J. McLeod Motorsports	Chevrolet	30.646
25	48	Jade Buford (R)	Big Machine Racing Team	Chevrolet	30.665
26	7	Justin Allgaier	JR Motorsports	Chevrolet	30.700
27	44	Tommy Joe Martins	Martins Motorsports	Chevrolet	30.727
28	6	Landon Cassill	JD Motorsports	Chevrolet	30.731
29	15	Colby Howard	JD Motorsports	Chevrolet	30.797
30	78	Jesse Little	B. J. McLeod Motorsports	Toyota	30.824
31	17	Cody Ware	SS-Green Light Racing with Rick Ware Racing	Ford	30.827
32	68	Brandon Brown	Brandonbilt Motorsports	Chevrolet	30.886
33	36	Alex Labbé	DGM Racing	Chevrolet	31.030
34	92	Josh Williams	DGM Racing	Chevrolet	31.167
35	26	Grant Enfinger (i)	Sam Hunt Racing	Toyota	31.207
36	66	Timmy Hill (i)	MBM Motorsports	Toyota	38.341
Did not qualify
37	61	David Starr	Hattori Racing Enterprises	Toyota	30.834
38	77	Dillon Bassett	Bassett Racing	Chevrolet	30.886
39	47	Kyle Weatherman	Mike Harmon Racing	Chevrolet	30.903
40	07	Joe Graf Jr.	SS-Green Light Racing	Chevrolet	30.955
41	52	Gray Gaulding	Means Motorsports	Chevrolet	31.166
42	74	Bayley Currey (i)	Mike Harmon Racing	Chevrolet	31.194
43	90	B. J. McLeod (i)	DGM Racing	Ford	
Official qualifying results

== Race ==
=== Race results ===
==== Stage Results ====
Stage One Laps: 45

Pos	No	Driver	Team	Manufacturer	Points
1	18	Daniel Hemric	Joe Gibbs Racing	Toyota	10
2	16	A. J. Allmendinger	Kaulig Racing	Chevrolet	9
3	54	Ty Gibbs (R)	Joe Gibbs Racing	Toyota	8
4	22	Austin Cindric	Team Penske	Ford	7
5	10	Jeb Burton	Kaulig Racing	Chevrolet	6
6	99	Chase Briscoe (i)	B. J. McLeod Motorsports	Ford	0
7	9	Noah Gragson	JR Motorsports	Chevrolet	4
8	20	Harrison Burton	Joe Gibbs Racing	Toyota	3
9	39	Ryan Sieg	RSS Racing	Ford	2
10	31	Tyler Reddick (i)	Jordan Anderson Racing	Chevrolet	0

Stage Two Laps: 45

Pos	No	Driver	Team	Manufacturer	Points
1	18	Daniel Hemric	Joe Gibbs Racing	Toyota	10
2	16	A. J. Allmendinger	Kaulig Racing	Chevrolet	9
3	9	Noah Gragson	JR Motorsports	Chevrolet	8
4	22	Austin Cindric	Team Penske	Ford	7
5	99	Chase Briscoe (i)	B. J. McLeod Motorsports	Ford	0
6	20	Harrison Burton	Joe Gibbs Racing	Toyota	5
7	10	Jeb Burton	Kaulig Racing	Chevrolet	4
8	54	Ty Gibbs (R)	Joe Gibbs Racing	Toyota	3
9	7	Justin Allgaier	JR Motorsports	Chevrolet	0
10	19	Brandon Jones	Joe Gibbs Racing	Toyota	1

=== Final Stage Results ===
Laps: 110

Pos	Grid	No	Driver	Team	Manufacturer	Laps	Points	Status
1	8	54	Ty Gibbs (R)	Joe Gibbs Racing	Toyota	200	51	Running
2	4	22	Austin Cindric	Team Penske	Ford	200	49	Running
3	13	20	Harrison Burton	Joe Gibbs Racing	Toyota	200	42	Running
4	32	68	Brandon Brown	Brandonbilt Motorsports	Chevrolet	200	33	Running
5	16	31	Tyler Reddick (i)	Jordan Anderson Racing	Chevrolet	200	0	Running
6	2	99	Chase Briscoe (i)	B. J. McLeod Motorsports	Ford	200	0	Running
7	10	23	Ty Dillon	Our Motorsports	Chevrolet	200	30	Running
8	14	19	Brandon Jones	Joe Gibbs Racing	Toyota	200	30	Running
9	9	10	Jeb Burton	Kaulig Racing	Chevrolet	200	38	Running
10	6	51	Jeremy Clements	Jeremy Clements Racing	Chevrolet	200	27	Running
11	26	7	Justin Allgaier	JR Motorsports	Chevrolet	200	28	Running
12	1	98	Riley Herbst	Stewart-Haas Racing	Ford	200	25	Running
13	28	6	Landon Cassill	JD Motorsports	Chevrolet	200	24	Running
14	33	36	Alex Labbé	DGM Racing	Chevrolet	200	23	Running
15	22	13	Chad Finchum	MBM Motorsports	Chevrolet	200	22	Running
16	20	4	Ryan Vargas (R)	JD Motorsports	Chevrolet	200	21	Running
17	25	48	Jade Buford (R)	Big Machine Racing Team	Chevrolet	200	20	Running
18	30	78	Jesse Little	B. J. McLeod Motorsports	Toyota	200	19	Running
19	11	11	Justin Haley	Kaulig Racing	Chevrolet	200	18	Running
20	31	17	Cody Ware	SS-Green Light Racing with Rick Ware Racing	Ford	200	17	Running
21	34	92	Josh Williams	DGM Racing	Chevrolet	199	16	Running
22	17	0	Jeffrey Earnhardt	JD Motorsports	Chevrolet	199	15	Running
23	21	76	Stefan Parsons	B. J. McLeod Motorsports	Chevrolet	199	14	Running
24	19	1	Michael Annett	JR Motorsports	Chevrolet	199	13	Running
25	15	02	Brett Moffitt	Our Motorsports	Chevrolet	198	12	Running
26	7	2	Myatt Snider	Richard Childress Racing	Chevrolet	196	11	Running
27	23	9	Noah Gragson	JR Motorsports	Chevrolet	187	22	Accident
28	3	18	Daniel Hemric	Joe Gibbs Racing	Toyota	186	29	Accident
29	27	44	Tommy Joe Martins	Martins Motorsports	Chevrolet	186	8	Accident
30	29	15	Colby Howard	JD Motorsports	Chevrolet	184	7	Running
31	12	39	Ryan Sieg	RSS Racing	Ford	151	8	Accident
32	18	8	Josh Berry (R)	JR Motorsports	Chevrolet	150	5	Accident
33	5	16	A. J. Allmendinger	Kaulig Racing	Chevrolet	128	22	Brakes
34	36	66	Timmy Hill (i)	MBM Motorsports	Toyota	114	0	Engine
35	24	5	Matt Mills	B. J. McLeod Motorsports	Chevrolet	103	2	Accident
36	35	26	Grant Enfinger (i)	Sam Hunt Racing	Toyota	13	0	Accident
Official race results

=== Race statistics ===
- Lead changes: 12 among 7 different drivers
- Cautions/Laps: 10 for 51
- Time of race: 2 hours, 39 minutes, and 57 seconds
- Average speed: 112.535 mph (181.108 km/h)

Previous race: 2021 Pit Boss 250	NASCAR Xfinity Series; 2021 season	Next race: 2021 B&L Transport 170
