= 2020 Alsco 300 (Charlotte) =

NASCAR Xfinity Series race

Race details
- Race 6 of 33 in the 2020 NASCAR Xfinity Series season
- Date: May 25, 2020
- Location: Charlotte Motor Speedway in Concord, North Carolina
- Course: Permanent racing facility
- Course length: 1.5 miles (2.414 km)
- Distance: 203 laps, 304.5 mi (490.045 km)
- Scheduled distance: 200 laps, 300 mi (482.803 km)

Pole position
Driver	Ross Chastain	Kaulig Racing
- Grid positions set by ballot

Most laps led
Driver	Kyle Busch	Joe Gibbs Racing
- Laps: 94

Winner
No. 54	Kyle Busch	Joe Gibbs Racing

Television in the United States
- Network: FS1
- Announcers: Adam Alexander, Clint Bowyer, and Jamie McMurray

Radio in the United States
- Radio: PRN
- Booth announcers: Doug Rice and Mark Garrow
- Turn announcers: Rob Albright (1 & 2) and Pat Patterson (3 & 4)

The 2020 Alsco 300 was a NASCAR Xfinity Series race held on May 25, 2020 at Charlotte Motor Speedway in Concord, North Carolina. Contested over 203 laps—extended from 200 laps due to an overtime finish, on the 1.5-mile (2.4 km) asphalt speedway, it was the sixth race of the 2020 NASCAR Xfinity Series season. Cup Series driver Kyle Busch took home his first Xfinity Series victory of the year.

== Report ==
=== Background ===
Charlotte Motor Speedway, the track where the race was held.

The race was held at Charlotte Motor Speedway, which is located in Concord, North Carolina. The speedway complex includes a 1.5-mile (2.4 km) quad-oval track, as well as a dragstrip and a dirt track. The speedway was built in 1959 by Bruton Smith and is considered the home track for NASCAR, as many race teams are based in the Charlotte metropolitan area. The track is owned and operated by Speedway Motorsports Inc. (SMI), with Marcus G. Smith serving as track president.

Because to the ongoing COVID-19 pandemic, a 260-spectator limit was imposed, as owners of the 52 condominium owners in Turn 1 were given five tickets to the race, with all staying inside during the race.

=== Entry list ===
- (R) denotes rookie driver.
- (i) denotes driver who is ineligible for series driver points.

No.	Driver	Team	Manufacturer
0	Jeffrey Earnhardt	JD Motorsports	Chevrolet
1	Michael Annett	JR Motorsports	Chevrolet
02	Brett Moffitt (i)	Our Motorsports	Chevrolet
4	Jesse Little (R)	JD Motorsports	Chevrolet
5	Matt Mills	B. J. McLeod Motorsports	Chevrolet
6	B. J. McLeod	JD Motorsports	Chevrolet
07	Garrett Smithley (i)	SS-Green Light Racing	Chevrolet
7	Justin Allgaier	JR Motorsports	Chevrolet
8	Daniel Hemric	JR Motorsports	Chevrolet
08	Joe Graf Jr. (R)	SS-Green Light Racing	Chevrolet
9	Noah Gragson	JR Motorsports	Chevrolet
10	Ross Chastain	Kaulig Racing	Chevrolet
11	Justin Haley	Kaulig Racing	Chevrolet
13	Chad Finchum	MBM Motorsports	Toyota
15	Colby Howard	JD Motorsports	Chevrolet
18	Riley Herbst (R)	Joe Gibbs Racing	Toyota
19	Brandon Jones	Joe Gibbs Racing	Toyota
20	Harrison Burton (R)	Joe Gibbs Racing	Toyota
21	Myatt Snider	Richard Childress Racing	Chevrolet
22	Austin Cindric	Team Penske	Ford
36	Alex Labbé	DGM Racing	Chevrolet
39	Ryan Sieg	RSS Racing	Chevrolet
44	Tommy Joe Martins	Martins Motorsports	Chevrolet
47	Joe Nemechek (i)	Mike Harmon Racing	Chevrolet
51	Jeremy Clements	Jeremy Clements Racing	Chevrolet
52	Kody Vanderwal (R)	Means Racing	Chevrolet
54	Kyle Busch (i)	Joe Gibbs Racing	Toyota
61	Austin Hill (i)	Hattori Racing	Toyota
66	Timmy Hill (i)	MBM Motorsports	Toyota
68	Brandon Brown	Brandonbilt Motorsports	Chevrolet
74	Robby Lyons (i)	Mike Harmon Racing	Chevrolet
78	Vinnie Miller	B. J. McLeod Motorsports	Chevrolet
90	Dillon Bassett	DGM Racing	Chevrolet
92	Josh Williams	DGM Racing	Chevrolet
93	Jeff Green	RSS Racing	Chevrolet
98	Chase Briscoe	Stewart-Haas Racing	Ford
99	Mason Massey	B. J. McLeod Motorsports	Toyota
Official entry list

== Qualifying ==
Ross Chastain was awarded the pole for the race as determined by a random draw.

=== Starting Lineup ===
Pos	No	Driver	Team	Manufacturer
1	10	Ross Chastain	Kaulig Racing	Chevrolet
2	19	Brandon Jones	Joe Gibbs Racing	Toyota
3	11	Justin Haley	Kaulig Racing	Chevrolet
4	7	Justin Allgaier	JR Motorsports	Chevrolet
5	18	Riley Herbst (R)	Joe Gibbs Racing	Toyota
6	22	Austin Cindric	Team Penske	Ford
7	39	Ryan Sieg	RSS Racing	Chevrolet
8	98	Chase Briscoe	Stewart-Haas Racing	Ford
9	1	Michael Annett	JR Motorsports	Chevrolet
10	9	Noah Gragson	JR Motorsports	Chevrolet
11	20	Harrison Burton (R)	Joe Gibbs Racing	Toyota
12	8	Daniel Hemric	JR Motorsports	Chevrolet
13	13	Chad Finchum	MBM Motorsports	Toyota
14	6	B. J. McLeod	JD Motorsports	Chevrolet
15	68	Brandon Brown	Brandonbilt Motorsports	Chevrolet
16	78	Vinnie Miller	B. J. McLeod Motorsports	Chevrolet
17	21	Myatt Snider	Richard Childress Racing	Chevrolet
18	54	Kyle Busch (i)	Joe Gibbs Racing	Toyota
19	90	Dillon Bassett	DGM Racing	Chevrolet
20	93	Jeff Green	RSS Racing	Chevrolet
21	92	Josh Williams	DGM Racing	Chevrolet
22	02	Brett Moffitt (i)	Our Motorsports	Chevrolet
23	0	Jeffrey Earnhardt	JD Motorsports	Chevrolet
24	07	Garrett Smithley (i)	SS-Green Light Racing	Chevrolet
25	66	Timmy Hill (i)	MBM Motorsports	Toyota
26	61	Austin Hill (i)	Hattori Racing	Toyota
27	51	Jeremy Clements	Jeremy Clements Racing	Chevrolet
28	08	Joe Graf Jr. (R)	SS-Green Light Racing	Chevrolet
29	15	Colby Howard	JD Motorsports	Chevrolet
30	99	Mason Massey	B. J. McLeod Motorsports	Toyota
31	47	Joe Nemechek (i)	Mike Harmon Racing	Chevrolet
32	44	Tommy Joe Martins	Martins Motorsports	Chevrolet
33	5	Matt Mills	B. J. McLeod Motorsports	Chevrolet
34	4	Jesse Little (R)	JD Motorsports	Chevrolet
35	52	Kody Vanderwal (R)	Means Racing	Chevrolet
36	74	Robby Lyons (i)	Mike Harmon Racing	Chevrolet
37	36	Alex Labbé	DGM Racing	Chevrolet
Official starting lineup

== Race ==
=== Race results ===
==== Stage Results ====
Stage One

Laps: 45

Pos	No	Driver	Team	Manufacturer	Points
1	54	Kyle Busch (i)	Joe Gibbs Racing	Toyota	0
2	10	Ross Chastain	Kaulig Racing	Chevrolet	9
3	11	Justin Haley	Kaulig Racing	Chevrolet	8
4	9	Noah Gragson	JR Motorsports	Chevrolet	7
5	19	Brandon Jones	Joe Gibbs Racing	Toyota	6
6	22	Austin Cindric	Team Penske	Ford	5
7	18	Riley Herbst (R)	Joe Gibbs Racing	Toyota	4
8	98	Chase Briscoe	Stewart-Haas Racing	Ford	3
9	8	Daniel Hemric	JR Motorsports	Chevrolet	2
10	20	Harrison Burton (R)	Joe Gibbs Racing	Toyota	1

Stage Two

Laps: 45

Pos	No	Driver	Team	Manufacturer	Points
1	54	Kyle Busch (i)	Joe Gibbs Racing	Toyota	0
2	10	Ross Chastain	Kaulig Racing	Chevrolet	9
3	98	Chase Briscoe	Stewart-Haas Racing	Ford	8
4	22	Austin Cindric	Team Penske	Ford	7
5	9	Noah Gragson	JR Motorsports	Chevrolet	6
6	19	Brandon Jones	Joe Gibbs Racing	Toyota	5
7	8	Daniel Hemric	JR Motorsports	Chevrolet	4
8	18	Riley Herbst (R)	Joe Gibbs Racing	Toyota	3
9	11	Justin Haley	Kaulig Racing	Chevrolet	2
10	20	Harrison Burton (R)	Joe Gibbs Racing	Toyota	1

=== Final Stage Results ===
Laps: 110

Pos	Grid	No	Driver	Team	Manufacturer	Laps	Points	Status
1	18	54	Kyle Busch (i)	Joe Gibbs Racing	Toyota	203	0	Running
2	12	8	Daniel Hemric	JR Motorsports	Chevrolet	203	41	Running
3	6	22	Austin Cindric	Team Penske	Ford	203	46	Running
4	1	10	Ross Chastain	Kaulig Racing	Chevrolet	203	51	Running
5	4	7	Justin Allgaier	JR Motorsports	Chevrolet	203	32	Running
6	22	02	Brett Moffitt (i)	Our Motorsports	Chevrolet	203	0	Running
7	9	1	Michael Annett	JR Motorsports	Chevrolet	203	30	Running
8	15	68	Brandon Brown	Brandonbilt Motorsports	Chevrolet	203	29	Running
9	11	20	Harrison Burton (R)	Joe Gibbs Racing	Toyota	203	30	Running
10	17	21	Myatt Snider	Richard Childress Racing	Chevrolet	203	27	Running
11	10	9	Noah Gragson	JR Motorsports	Chevrolet	203	39	Running
12	5	18	Riley Herbst (R)	Joe Gibbs Racing	Toyota	202	32	Running
13	19	90	Dillon Bassett	DGM Racing	Chevrolet	201	24	Running
14	21	92	Josh Williams	DGM Racing	Chevrolet	201	23	Running
15	34	4	Jesse Little (R)	JD Motorsports	Chevrolet	201	22	Running
16	37	36	Alex Labbé	DGM Racing	Chevrolet	201	21	Running
17	14	6	B. J. McLeod	JD Motorsports	Chevrolet	200	20	Running
18	36	74	Bayley Currey (i)	Mike Harmon Racing	Chevrolet	200	0	Running
19	28	08	Joe Graf Jr. (R)	SS-Green Light Racing	Chevrolet	200	18	Running
20	8	98	Chase Briscoe	Stewart-Haas Racing	Ford	200	28	Running
21	30	99	Mason Massey	B. J. McLeod Motorsports	Toyota	200	16	Running
22	13	13	Chad Finchum	MBM Motorsports	Toyota	200	15	Running
23	16	78	Vinnie Miller	B. J. McLeod Motorsports	Chevrolet	199	14	Running
24	32	44	Tommy Joe Martins	Martins Motorsports	Chevrolet	198	13	Accident
25	23	0	Jeffrey Earnhardt	JD Motorsports	Chevrolet	198	12	Running
26	31	47	Joe Nemechek (i)	Mike Harmon Racing	Chevrolet	198	0	Running
27	2	19	Brandon Jones	Joe Gibbs Racing	Toyota	197	21	Accident
28	7	39	Ryan Sieg	RSS Racing	Chevrolet	197	9	Running
29	3	11	Justin Haley	Kaulig Racing	Chevrolet	196	18	Accident
30	33	5	Matt Mills	B. J. McLeod Motorsports	Chevrolet	196	7	Running
31	24	07	Garrett Smithley	SS-Green Light Racing	Chevrolet	193	6	Running
32	27	51	Jeremy Clements	Jeremy Clements Racing	Chevrolet	176	5	Accident
33	26	61	Austin Hill (i)	Hattori Racing	Toyota	173	0	Accident
34	25	66	Timmy Hill (i)	MBM Motorsports	Toyota	151	0	Engine
35	35	52	Kody Vanderwal (R)	Means Racing	Chevrolet	26	2	Engine
36	20	93	Jeff Green	RSS Racing	Chevrolet	15	1	Power
37	29	15	Colby Howard	JD Motorsports	Chevrolet	11	1	Overheating
Official race results

=== Race statistics ===
- Lead changes: 20 among 5 different drivers
- Cautions/Laps: 11 for 53
- Red flags: 0
- Time of race: 2 hours, 43 minutes, 30 seconds
- Average speed: 111.743 mph (179.833 km/h)

== Media ==
=== Television ===
The Alsco 300 was carried by FS1 in the United States. Adam Alexander, Stewart-Haas Racing driver Clint Bowyer, and Jamie McMurray called the race from the Fox Sports Studio in Charlotte, with Matt Yocum covering pit road.

FS1
Booth announcers	Pit reporter
Lap-by-lap: Adam Alexander Color-commentator: Clint Bowyer Color-commentator: Jamie McMurray	Matt Yocum

=== Radio ===
The Performance Racing Network (PRN) called the race for radio, which was simulcast on SiriusXM NASCAR Radio. Doug Rice and Mark Garrow anchored the action from the booth. Rob Albright called the action from Turns 1 & 2 and Pat Patterson called the race through turns 3 & 4. Brad Gillie, Brett McMillan, and Wendy Venturini provided reports from pit road.

PRN Radio
Booth announcers	Turn announcers	Pit reporters
Lead announcer: Doug Rice Announcer: Mark Garrow	Turns 1 & 2: Rob Albright Turns 3 & 4: Pat Patterson	Brad Gillie Brett McMillan Wendy Venturini

== Standings after the race ==
Drivers' Championship standings

	Pos	Driver	Points
	1	Chase Briscoe	251
1	2	Austin Cindric	243 (-8)
2	3	Ross Chastain	239 (-12)
2	4	Harrison Burton (R)	234 (-17)
1	5	Noah Gragson	232 (-19)
	6	Justin Allgaier	218 (-33)
	7	Ryan Sieg	192 (-59)
1	8	Brandon Jones	186 (-65)
1	9	Justin Haley	186 (-65)
	10	Michael Annett	169 (-82)
	11	Riley Herbst (R)	160 (-91)
	12	Brandon Brown	144 (-107)
Official driver's standings

- Note: Only the first 12 positions are included for the driver standings.
- . – Driver has clinched a position in the NASCAR playoffs.

Previous race: 2020 Toyota 200	NASCAR Xfinity Series; 2020 season	Next race: 2020 Cheddar's 300
