= 2022 Tennessee Lottery 250 =

15th race of the 2022 NASCAR Xfinity Series

Race details
- Race 15 of 33 of the 2022 NASCAR Xfinity Series
- Date: June 25, 2022
- Official name: 13th Annual Tennessee Lottery 250
- Location: Nashville Superspeedway, Gladeville, Tennessee
- Course: Permanent racing facility
- Course length: 1.333 miles (2.145 km)
- Distance: 188 laps, 250 mi (400 km)
- Scheduled distance: 188 laps, 250 mi (400 km)
- Average speed: 119.319 mph (192.025 km/h)

Pole position
Driver	Riley Herbst	Stewart-Haas Racing
- Time: 30.562

Most laps led
Driver	Justin Allgaier	JR Motorsports
- Laps: 134

Winner
No. 7	Justin Allgaier	JR Motorsports

Television in the United States
- Network: USA Network
- Announcers: Rick Allen, Jeff Burton, Steve Letarte, Dale Earnhardt Jr.

Radio in the United States
- Radio: Motor Racing Network

The 2022 Tennessee Lottery 250 was the fifteenth stock car race of the 2022 NASCAR Xfinity Series and the 13th iteration of the event. The race was held on Saturday, June 25, 2022, in Gladeville, Tennessee, at Nashville Superspeedway, a 1.333-mile (2.145 km) permanent D-shaped racetrack. The race took its scheduled 188 laps to complete. Justin Allgaier, driving for JR Motorsports, put on a dominating performance, winning both stages and leading 134 laps for his 18th career Xfinity Series win and his second of the season. To fill out the podium, Trevor Bayne, driving for Joe Gibbs Racing, and Riley Herbst, driving for Stewart-Haas Racing, finished 2nd and 3rd, respectively.

== Background ==
Nashville Superspeedway is a motor racing complex located in Gladeville, Tennessee, United States (though the track has a Lebanon postal address), about 30 mi (48 km) southeast of Nashville. The track was built in 2001 and is currently hosting the Ally 400, a NASCAR Cup Series regular season event, the Tennessee Lottery 250, and the Rackley Roofing 200.

It is a concrete oval track 1 1/3 miles (2.146 km) long. Nashville Superspeedway is owned by Speedway Motorsports, which acquired the track's previous owner Dover Motorsports in December 2021. Nashville Superspeedway is the longest concrete oval in NASCAR. Current permanent seating capacity is approximately 25,000, but will reach up to 38,000 for the NASCAR Cup Series event in 2021. Additional portable seats are brought in for some events, and seating capacity can be expanded to 150,000. Infrastructure is in place to expand the facility to include a short track, drag strip, and road course.

=== Entry list ===
- (R) denotes rookie driver.
- (i) denotes driver who is ineligible for series driver points.

#	Driver	Team	Make
1	Sam Mayer	JR Motorsports	Chevrolet
02	Brett Moffitt	Our Motorsports	Chevrolet
2	Sheldon Creed (R)	Richard Childress Racing	Chevrolet
4	Bayley Currey	JD Motorsports	Chevrolet
5	Ryan Preece (i)	B. J. McLeod Motorsports	Ford
6	Ryan Vargas	JD Motorsports	Chevrolet
07	Joe Graf Jr.	SS-Green Light Racing	Ford
7	Justin Allgaier	JR Motorsports	Chevrolet
08	B. J. McLeod	SS-Green Light Racing	Ford
8	Josh Berry	JR Motorsports	Chevrolet
9	Noah Gragson	JR Motorsports	Chevrolet
10	Landon Cassill	Kaulig Racing	Chevrolet
11	Daniel Hemric	Kaulig Racing	Chevrolet
13	J. J. Yeley	MBM Motorsports	Toyota
16	A. J. Allmendinger	Kaulig Racing	Chevrolet
18	Trevor Bayne	Joe Gibbs Racing	Toyota
19	Brandon Jones	Joe Gibbs Racing	Toyota
21	Austin Hill (R)	Richard Childress Racing	Chevrolet
23	Anthony Alfredo	Our Motorsports	Chevrolet
26	Jeffrey Earnhardt	Sam Hunt Racing	Toyota
27	Jeb Burton	Our Motorsports	Chevrolet
28	Parker Retzlaff	RSS Racing	Ford
31	Myatt Snider	Jordan Anderson Racing	Chevrolet
34	Kyle Weatherman	Jesse Iwuji Motorsports	Chevrolet
35	Patrick Emerling	Emerling-Gase Motorsports	Chevrolet
36	Alex Labbé	DGM Racing	Chevrolet
38	Kyle Sieg (R)	RSS Racing	Ford
39	Ryan Sieg	RSS Racing	Ford
44	Ryan Ellis	Alpha Prime Racing	Chevrolet
45	Stefan Parsons	Alpha Prime Racing	Chevrolet
47	Brennan Poole (i)	Mike Harmon Racing	Chevrolet
48	Tyler Reddick (i)	Big Machine Racing	Chevrolet
51	Jeremy Clements	Jeremy Clements Racing	Chevrolet
54	Ty Gibbs	Joe Gibbs Racing	Toyota
66	Natalie Decker	MBM Motorsports	Toyota
68	Brandon Brown	Brandonbilt Motorsports	Chevrolet
77	Dillon Bassett	Bassett Racing	Chevrolet
78	Josh Williams	B. J. McLeod Motorsports	Chevrolet
91	Mason Massey	DGM Racing	Chevrolet
98	Riley Herbst	Stewart-Haas Racing	Ford
99	Matt Mills (i)	B. J. McLeod Motorsports	Chevrolet
Official entry list

== Practice ==
The only 50-minute practice session was held on Friday, June 24, at 4:35 PM CST. Sheldon Creed, driving for Richard Childress Racing, was the fastest in the session, with a time of 30.727 seconds, and a speed of 155.824 mph (250.774 km/h).

Pos.	#	Driver	Team	Make	Time	Speed
1	2	Sheldon Creed (R)	Richard Childress Racing	Chevrolet	30.727	155.824
2	16	A. J. Allmendinger	Kaulig Racing	Chevrolet	30.922	154.841
3	9	Noah Gragson	JR Motorsports	Chevrolet	30.992	154.491
Full practice results

== Qualifying ==
Qualifying was held on Saturday, June 25, at 11:30 AM CST. Since Nashville Superspeedway is an oval track, the qualifying system used is a single-car, one-lap system with only one round. Whoever sets the fastest time in the round wins the pole. Riley Herbst, driving for Stewart-Haas Racing, scored the pole for the race, with a time of 30.562 seconds, and a speed of 156.665 mph (252.128 km/h).

Pos.	#	Driver	Team	Make	Time	Speed
1	98	Riley Herbst	Stewart-Haas Racing	Ford	30.562	156.665
2	16	A. J. Allmendinger	Kaulig Racing	Chevrolet	30.653	156.200
3	18	Trevor Bayne	Joe Gibbs Racing	Toyota	30.701	155.956
4	21	Austin Hill (R)	Richard Childress Racing	Chevrolet	30.725	155.834
5	7	Justin Allgaier	JR Motorsports	Chevrolet	30.728	155.819
6	9	Noah Gragson	JR Motorsports	Chevrolet	30.738	155.768
7	27	Jeb Burton	Our Motorsports	Chevrolet	30.815	155.379
8	19	Brandon Jones	Joe Gibbs Racing	Toyota	30.873	155.087
9	8	Josh Berry	JR Motorsports	Chevrolet	30.876	155.072
10	11	Daniel Hemric	Kaulig Racing	Chevrolet	30.903	154.936
11	26	Jeffrey Earnhardt	Sam Hunt Racing	Toyota	30.953	154.686
12	10	Landon Cassill	Kaulig Racing	Chevrolet	30.965	154.626
13	07	Joe Graf Jr.	SS-Green Light Racing	Ford	30.992	154.491
14	54	Ty Gibbs	Joe Gibbs Racing	Toyota	31.014	154.382
15	02	Brett Moffitt	Our Motorsports	Chevrolet	31.018	154.362
16	34	Kyle Weatherman	Jesse Iwuji Motorsports	Chevrolet	31.070	154.104
17	68	Brandon Brown	Brandonbilt Motorsports	Chevrolet	31.083	154.039
18	48	Tyler Reddick (i)	Big Machine Racing	Chevrolet	31.087	154.019
19	2	Sheldon Creed (R)	Richard Childress Racing	Chevrolet	31.131	153.802
20	44	Ryan Ellis	Alpha Prime Racing	Chevrolet	31.139	153.762
21	1	Sam Mayer	JR Motorsports	Chevrolet	31.157	153.673
22	51	Jeremy Clements	Jeremy Clements Racing	Chevrolet	31.188	153.521
23	45	Stefan Parsons (i)	Alpha Prime Racing	Chevrolet	31.193	153.496
24	39	Ryan Sieg	RSS Racing	Ford	31.194	153.491
25	28	Parker Retzlaff	RSS Racing	Ford	31.223	153.348
26	23	Anthony Alfredo	Our Motorsports	Chevrolet	31.225	153.339
27	5	Ryan Preece (i)	B. J. McLeod Motorsports	Ford	31.349	152.732
28	38	Kyle Sieg (R)	RSS Racing	Ford	31.360	152.679
29	6	Ryan Vargas	JD Motorsports	Chevrolet	31.374	152.610
30	77	Dillon Bassett	Bassett Racing	Chevrolet	31.424	152.368
31	36	Alex Labbé	DGM Racing	Chevrolet	31.432	152.329
32	78	Josh Williams	B. J. McLeod Motorsports	Chevrolet	31.433	152.324
33	13	J. J. Yeley	MBM Motorsports	Toyota	31.433	152.324
Qualified by owner's points
34	08	B. J. McLeod	SS-Green Light Racing	Ford	31.471	152.140
35	31	Myatt Snider	Jordan Anderson Racing	Chevrolet	31.486	152.068
36	4	Bayley Currey	JD Motorsports	Chevrolet	31.970	149.765
37	66	Natalie Decker	MBM Motorsports	Toyota	32.044	149.420
38	35	Patrick Emerling	Emerling-Gase Motorsports	Chevrolet	32.095	149.182
Failed to qualify
39	91	Mason Massey	DGM Racing	Chevrolet	31.528	151.865
40	47	Brennan Poole (i)	Mike Harmon Racing	Chevrolet	31.779	150.666
41	99	Matt Mills (i)	B. J. McLeod Motorsports	Chevrolet	-	-
Official qualifying results
Official starting lineup

== Race results ==
Stage 1 Laps: 45

Pos.	#	Driver	Team	Make	Pts
1	7	Justin Allgaier	JR Motorsports	Chevrolet	10
2	18	Trevor Bayne	Joe Gibbs Racing	Toyota	9
3	98	Riley Herbst	Stewart-Haas Racing	Ford	8
4	16	A. J. Allmendinger	Kaulig Racing	Chevrolet	7
5	21	Austin Hill (R)	Richard Childress Racing	Chevrolet	6
6	8	Josh Berry	JR Motorsports	Chevrolet	5
7	54	Ty Gibbs	Joe Gibbs Racing	Toyota	4
8	19	Brandon Jones	Joe Gibbs Racing	Toyota	3
9	1	Sam Mayer	JR Motorsports	Chevrolet	2
10	9	Noah Gragson	JR Motorsports	Chevrolet	1

Stage 2 Laps: 50

Pos.	#	Driver	Team	Make	Pts
1	7	Justin Allgaier	JR Motorsports	Chevrolet	10
2	54	Ty Gibbs	Joe Gibbs Racing	Toyota	9
3	1	Sam Mayer	JR Motorsports	Chevrolet	8
4	98	Riley Herbst	Stewart-Haas Racing	Ford	7
5	18	Trevor Bayne	Joe Gibbs Racing	Toyota	6
6	9	Noah Gragson	JR Motorsports	Chevrolet	5
7	8	Josh Berry	JR Motorsports	Chevrolet	4
8	19	Brandon Jones	Joe Gibbs Racing	Toyota	3
9	5	Ryan Preece (i)	B. J. McLeod Motorsports	Ford	0
10	21	Austin Hill (R)	Richard Childress Racing	Chevrolet	1

Stage 3 Laps: 93

Fin.	St	#	Driver	Team	Make	Laps	Led	Status	Pts
1	5	7	Justin Allgaier	JR Motorsports	Chevrolet	188	134	Running	60
2	3	18	Trevor Bayne	Joe Gibbs Racing	Toyota	188	0	Running	50
3	1	98	Riley Herbst	Stewart-Haas Racing	Ford	188	0	Running	49
4	14	54	Ty Gibbs	Joe Gibbs Racing	Toyota	188	4	Running	46
5	21	1	Sam Mayer	JR Motorsports	Chevrolet	188	0	Running	42
6	27	5	Ryan Preece (i)	B. J. McLeod Motorsports	Ford	188	0	Running	0
7	11	26	Jeffrey Earnhardt	Sam Hunt Racing	Toyota	188	0	Running	30
8	4	21	Austin Hill (R)	Richard Childress Racing	Chevrolet	188	0	Running	36
9	24	39	Ryan Sieg	RSS Racing	Ford	188	0	Running	28
10	15	02	Brett Moffitt	Our Motorsports	Chevrolet	188	0	Running	27
11	17	68	Brandon Brown	Brandonbilt Motorsports	Chevrolet	188	0	Running	26
12	25	28	Parker Retzlaff	RSS Racing	Ford	188	0	Running	25
13	6	9	Noah Gragson	JR Motorsports	Chevrolet	187	0	Running	30
14	8	19	Brandon Jones	Joe Gibbs Racing	Toyota	187	1	Running	29
15	23	45	Stefan Parsons (i)	Alpha Prime Racing	Chevrolet	187	0	Running	0
16	2	16	A. J. Allmendinger	Kaulig Racing	Chevrolet	187	48	Running	28
17	10	11	Daniel Hemric	Kaulig Racing	Chevrolet	187	0	Running	20
18	12	10	Landon Cassill	Kaulig Racing	Chevrolet	187	0	Running	19
19	29	6	Ryan Vargas	JD Motorsports	Chevrolet	187	0	Running	18
20	26	23	Anthony Alfredo	Our Motorsports	Chevrolet	187	0	Running	17
21	18	48	Tyler Reddick (i)	Big Machine Racing	Chevrolet	186	0	Running	0
22	22	51	Jeremy Clements	Jeremy Clements Racing	Chevrolet	186	0	Running	15
23	31	36	Alex Labbé	DGM Racing	Chevrolet	186	0	Running	14
24	20	44	Ryan Ellis	Alpha Prime Racing	Chevrolet	185	0	Running	13
25	28	38	Kyle Sieg (R)	RSS Racing	Ford	185	0	Running	12
26	38	35	Patrick Emerling	Emerling-Gase Motorsports	Chevrolet	185	0	Running	11
27	35	31	Myatt Snider	Jordan Anderson Racing	Chevrolet	185	0	Running	10
28	34	08	B. J. McLeod	SS-Green Light Racing	Ford	185	0	Running	9
29	9	8	Josh Berry	JR Motorsports	Chevrolet	184	1	Running	17
30	30	77	Dillon Bassett	Bassett Racing	Chevrolet	182	0	Running	7
31	36	4	Bayley Currey	JD Motorsports	Chevrolet	181	0	Running	6
32	37	66	Natalie Decker	MBM Motorsports	Toyota	181	0	Running	5
33	33	13	J. J. Yeley	MBM Motorsports	Toyota	157	0	Running	4
34	32	78	Josh Williams	B. J. McLeod Motorsports	Chevrolet	136	0	Electrical	3
35	7	27	Jeb Burton	Our Motorsports	Chevrolet	126	0	Accident	2
36	19	2	Sheldon Creed (R)	Richard Childress Racing	Chevrolet	124	0	Accident	1
37	13	07	Joe Graf Jr.	SS-Green Light Racing	Ford	123	0	Accident	1
38	16	34	Kyle Weatherman	Jesse Iwuji Motorsports	Chevrolet	118	0	Power	1
Official race results

== Standings after the race ==
Drivers' Championship standings

Pos	Driver	Points
1	A. J. Allmendinger	601
2	Ty Gibbs	576 (−25)
3	Justin Allgaier	569 (−32)
4	Noah Gragson	559 (−42)
5	Josh Berry	526 (−75)
6	Sam Mayer	466 (−135)
7	Brandon Jones	457 (−144)
8	Austin Hill	452 (−149)
9	Riley Herbst	413 (−188)
10	Daniel Hemric	409 (−192)
11	Landon Cassill	385 (−216)
12	Ryan Sieg	373 (−228)
Official driver's standings

- Note: Only the first 12 positions are included for the driver standings.

Previous race: 2022 Pacific Office Automation 147	NASCAR Xfinity Series; 2022 season	Next race: 2022 Henry 180
