= Dillon Bassett =

American racing driver

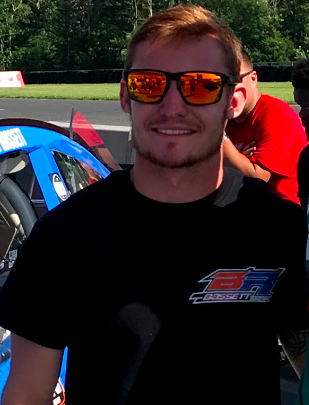
- Bassett at New Jersey Motorsports Park in 2018
- Born: Dillon W. Bassett; April 2, 1997 (age 29); Winston-Salem, North Carolina, U.S.
- Achievements: 2013 UARA-Stars Champion

NASCAR O'Reilly Auto Parts Series career
- 9 races run over 3 years
- 2021 position: 108th
- Best finish: 13th (2019)
- First race: 2019 ToyotaCare 250 (Richmond)
- Last race: 2022 Tennessee Lottery 250 (Nashville)
Wins	Top tens	Poles
0	0	0
- Statistics up to date as of December 28, 2021.

Dillon W. Bassett (born April 2, 1997) is an American professional stock car racing driver. He last competed part-time in the NASCAR Xfinity Series, driving the No. 77 Chevrolet Camaro for his team, Bassett Racing. He and his family team also previously competed full-time in what is now the ARCA Menards Series East. He is the brother of Ronnie Bassett Jr., who also drives for and co-owns Bassett Racing.

== Racing career ==
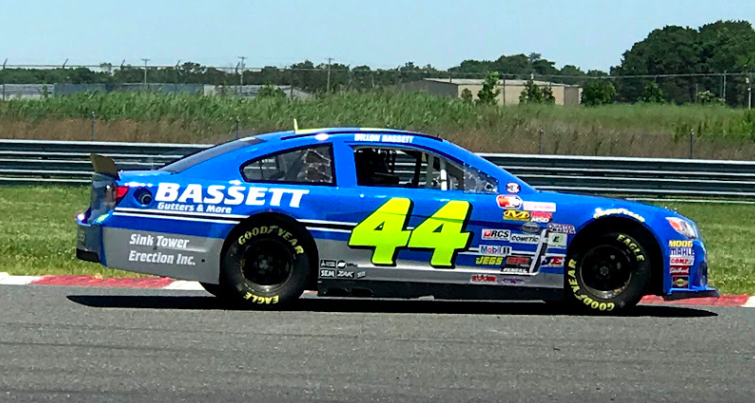
Bassett in the NASCAR K&N Pro Series East race at New Jersey Motorsports Park in 2018

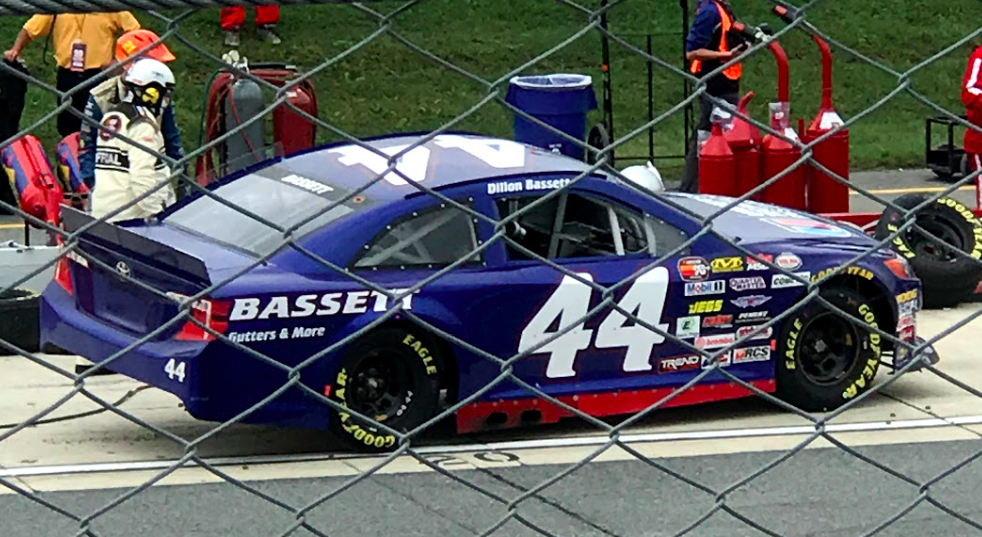
Bassett on pit road in the East Series race at Dover in 2018

He is the younger brother of fellow driver Ronnie Bassett Jr. The two drove for family-operated Bassett Racing in the K&N series, owned by their father Ronnie Sr. Moving up to the NASCAR Xfinity Series in 2019, Bassett made headlines when he ran into a sweeper truck at Iowa Speedway in July, relegating him to a 26th-place finish. In his next race at Richmond Raceway, Bassett came to finish 13th, a career-best in the Xfinity Series.

After the finish of the LS Tractor 200 at Phoenix Raceway, Bassett and Brandon Brown had a fight on pit road.

On February 2, 2021, it was announced that the Bassett brothers had split from DGM Racing and would be restarting their family team, Bassett Racing, which would field the No. 77 Chevrolet Camaro full-time in the Xfinity Series that year. Dillon and Ronnie Bassett will share the car with the likely possibility of additional drivers also making starts in select races. DGM crew chief Nathan Kennedy also moved over with the Bassett brothers to their new team. Dillon Bassett failed to qualify every race he attempted.

In 2022, Bassett and his team finally managed to qualify for a race at Nashville after suffering multiple DNQs. This wasn't the first time Bassett Racing finally managed to qualify for a race, as they qualified for the race at COTA last year with Austin Dillon.

== Motorsports career results ==
=== NASCAR ===
(key) (Bold – Pole position awarded by qualifying time. Italics – Pole position earned by points standings or practice time. * – Most laps led.)

==== Xfinity Series ====
NASCAR Xfinity Series results
Year	Team	No.	Make	1	2	3	4	5	6	7	8	9	10	11	12	13	14	15	16	17	18	19	20	21	22	23	24	25	26	27	28	29	30	31	32	33	NXSC	Pts	Ref
2019	DGM Racing	90	Chevy	DAY	ATL	LVS	PHO	CAL	TEX	BRI	RCH; 15	TAL	DOV	CLT; DNQ	POC	MCH; 38	IOW	CHI	DAY	KEN		IOW; 26	GLN	MOH	BRI	ROA	DAR	IND	LVS	RCH; 13	CLT	DOV; 14					40th	102	
2019	Brandonbilt Motorsports	68	Chevy																		NHA; DNQ																40th	102	
2019	DGM Racing	92	Chevy																														KAN; 16	TEX	PHO	HOM	40th	102	
2020	DGM Racing	90	Chevy	DAY	LVS	CAL	PHO; 18	DAR	CLT; 13	BRI	ATL	HOM	HOM	TAL	POC	IND	KEN	KEN	TEX	KAN	ROA	DAY	DOV	DOV	DAY	DAR	RCH	RCH	BRI	LVS	TAL	CLT	KAN	TEX	MAR	PHO	52nd	43	
2021	Bassett Racing	77	Chevy	DAY	DAY	HOM	LVS; DNQ	PHO; DNQ	ATL	MAR	TAL	DAR	DOV	COA	CLT; DNQ	MOH; DNQ	TEX; DNQ									DAY; DNQ	DAR	RCH	BRI	LVS	TAL	CLT	TEX	KAN	MAR	PHO	108th	-	
2021	DGM Racing	90	Chevy															NSH; DNQ	POC	ROA	ATL	NHA	GLN	IND	MCH												108th	-	
2022	Bassett Racing	77	Chevy	DAY	CAL	LVS	PHO	ATL; DNQ	COA	RCH; DNQ	MAR	TAL	DOV	DAR	TEX	CLT	PIR	NSH; 30	ROA	ATL	NHA	POC	IND	MCH; 34	GLN	DAY	DAR	KAN; 29	BRI	TEX	TAL	CLT	LVS	HOM; DNQ	MAR	PHO; 38	61st	19	

==== K&N Pro Series East ====
NASCAR K&N Pro Series East results
Year	Team	No.	Make	1	2	3	4	5	6	7	8	9	10	11	12	13	14	NKNPSEC	Pts	Ref
2015	Bassett Racing	44	Ford	NSM; 6	GRE; 16	BRI; 18	IOW; 20		LGY; 13	COL; 8	NHA; 13	IOW; 11	GLN	MOT; 1	VIR	RCH; 2	DOV; 31	13th	377	
2015	Bassett Racing	44	Toyota					BGS; 16										13th	377	
2016	Bassett Racing	44	Ford	NSM; 27	MOB; 24	GRE; 5	BRI; 5	VIR; 13										17th	270	
2016	Bassett Racing	44	Toyota						DOM; 22	STA; 2	COL	NHA	IOW	GLN				17th	270	
2016	Bassett Racing	44	Chevy												GRE; 6	NJE	DOV; 23	17th	270	
2017	Bassett Racing	44	Chevy	NSM; 24*	GRE; 8*	BRI; 21	SBO; 4	SBO; 13	MEM; 9	BLN; 17	TMP; 5	NHA; 8	IOW; 20	GLN; 9	LGY; 13*	NJE; 7	DOV; 14	8th	450	
2018	Bassett Racing	44	Ford	NSM; 25														8th	448	
2018	Bassett Racing	44	Chevy		BRI; 16	LGY; 4	SBO; 17	SBO; 8	MEM; 6	NJE; 15				GLN; 21	GTW; 8			8th	448	
2018	Bassett Racing	44	Toyota								TMP; 2	NHA; 20	IOW; 12			NHA; 5	DOV; 10	8th	448	

==== K&N Pro Series West ====
NASCAR K&N Pro Series West results
Year	Team	No.	Make	1	2	3	4	5	6	7	8	9	10	11	12	13	14	NKNPSWC	Pts	Ref
2017	Bassett Racing	44	Chevy	KCR	TUS	IRW	IRW	SPO	OSS	CNS	SON	IOW	EVG	DCS	MER	AAS	KCR; 5	38th	41	
