= 2021 B&L Transport 170 =

Race details
- Race 13 of 33 in the 2021 NASCAR Xfinity Series season
- Mid-Ohio Sports Car Course
- Date: June 5, 2021
- Location: Mid-Ohio Sports Car Course in Lexington, Ohio
- Course: Permanent racing facility
- Course length: 2.258 miles (3.634 km)
- Distance: 78 laps, 176.124 mi (283.444 km)
- Scheduled distance: 75 laps, 169.350 mi (272.542 km)
- Average speed: 66.212 mph

Pole position
Driver	Austin Cindric	Team Penske
- Grid positions set by competition-based formula

Most laps led
Driver	Austin Cindric	Team Penske
- Laps: 30

Winner
No. 16	A. J. Allmendinger	Kaulig Racing

Television in the United States
- Network: FS1
- Announcers: Adam Alexander, Jamie McMurray, and Michael Waltrip

The 2021 B&L Transport 170 was a NASCAR Xfinity Series race held on June 5, 2021. It was contested over 78 laps—extended from 75 laps due to an overtime finish—on the 2.258-mile (3.634 km) Mid-Ohio Sports Car Course. It was the thirteenth race of the 2021 NASCAR Xfinity Series season. Kaulig Racing driver A. J. Allmendinger collected his second win of the season.

== Report ==
=== Background ===
The track opened as a 15-turn, 2.4-mile (3.86 km) road circuit run clockwise. The back portion of the track allows speeds approaching 180 mph (290 km/h). A separate starting line is located on the backstretch to allow for safer rolling starts. The regular start/finish line is located on the pit straight.

=== Entry list ===
- (R) denotes rookie driver.
- (i) denotes driver who is ineligible for series driver points.

No.	Driver	Team	Manufacturer
0	Jeffrey Earnhardt	JD Motorsports	Chevrolet
1	Michael Annett	JR Motorsports	Chevrolet
2	Myatt Snider	Richard Childress Racing	Chevrolet
02	Brett Moffitt	Our Motorsports	Chevrolet
4	Ryan Vargas (R)	JD Motorsports	Chevrolet
5	Matt Mills	B. J. McLeod Motorsports	Chevrolet
6	Landon Cassill	JD Motorsports	Chevrolet
7	Justin Allgaier	JR Motorsports	Chevrolet
07	Joe Graf Jr.	SS-Green Light Racing	Chevrolet
8	Miguel Paludo	JR Motorsports	Chevrolet
9	Noah Gragson	JR Motorsports	Chevrolet
10	Jeb Burton	Kaulig Racing	Chevrolet
11	Justin Haley	Kaulig Racing	Chevrolet
13	Timmy Hill (i)	MBM Motorsports	Toyota
15	Colby Howard	JD Motorsports	Chevrolet
16	A. J. Allmendinger	Kaulig Racing	Chevrolet
17	Cody Ware	SS-Green Light Racing with Rick Ware Racing	Ford
18	Daniel Hemric	Joe Gibbs Racing	Toyota
19	Brandon Jones	Joe Gibbs Racing	Toyota
20	Harrison Burton	Joe Gibbs Racing	Toyota
22	Austin Cindric	Team Penske	Ford
23	Andy Lally	Our Motorsports	Chevrolet
26	Kris Wright (i)	Sam Hunt Racing	Toyota
31	Josh Berry	Jordan Anderson Racing	Chevrolet
36	Alex Labbé	DGM Racing	Chevrolet
39	Ryan Sieg	RSS Racing	Ford
44	Tommy Joe Martins	Martins Motorsports	Chevrolet
47	Kyle Weatherman	Mike Harmon Racing	Chevrolet
48	Jade Buford (R)	Big Machine Racing Team	Chevrolet
51	Jeremy Clements	Jeremy Clements Racing	Chevrolet
52	Gray Gaulding	Means Racing	Chevrolet
54	Ty Gibbs (R)	Joe Gibbs Racing	Toyota
61	David Starr	Hattori Racing Enterprises	Toyota
66	Matt Jaskol	MBM Motorsports	Toyota
68	Brandon Brown	Brandonbilt Motorsports	Chevrolet
74	Bayley Currey (i)	Mike Harmon Racing	Chevrolet
77	Dillon Bassett	Bassett Racing	Chevrolet
78	Jesse Little	B. J. McLeod Motorsports	Toyota
90	Preston Pardus	DGM Racing	Ford
92	Josh Williams	DGM Racing	Chevrolet
98	Riley Herbst	Stewart-Haas Racing	Ford
99	Ryan Ellis	B. J. McLeod Motorsports	Ford
Official entry list

== Qualifying ==
Austin Cindric was awarded the pole for the race as determined by competition-based formula. Dillon Bassett and Timmy Hill did not have enough points to qualify for the race.

=== Starting Lineups ===
Pos	No	Driver	Team	Manufacturer
1	22	Austin Cindric	Team Penske	Ford
2	54	Ty Gibbs	Joe Gibbs Racing	Toyota
3	20	Harrison Burton	Joe Gibbs Racing	Toyota
4	10	Jeb Burton	Kaulig Racing	Chevrolet
5	7	Justin Allgaier	JR Motorsports	Chevrolet
6	68	Brandon Brown	Brandonbilt Motorsports	Chevrolet
7	19	Brandon Jones	Joe Gibbs Racing	Toyota
8	51	Jeremy Clements	Jeremy Clements Racing	Chevrolet
9	98	Riley Herbst	Stewart-Haas Racing	Ford
10	11	Justin Haley	Kaulig Racing	Chevrolet
11	18	Daniel Hemric	Joe Gibbs Racing	Toyota
12	16	A. J. Allmendinger	Kaulig Racing	Chevrolet
13	9	Noah Gragson	JR Motorsports	Chevrolet
14	2	Myatt Snider	Richard Childress Racing	Chevrolet
15	1	Michael Annett	JR Motorsports	Chevrolet
16	36	Alex Labbé	DGM Racing	Chevrolet
17	4	Ryan Vargas (R)	JD Motorsports	Chevrolet
18	02	Brett Moffitt	Our Motorsports	Chevrolet
19	48	Jade Buford (R)	Big Machine Racing Team	Chevrolet
20	6	Landon Cassill	JD Motorsports	Chevrolet
21	17	Cody Ware	SS-Green Light Racing with Rick Ware Racing	Ford
22	78	Jesse Little	B. J. McLeod Motorsports	Toyota
23	39	Ryan Sieg	RSS Racing	Ford
24	92	Josh Williams	DGM Racing	Chevrolet
25	44	Tommy Joe Martins	Martins Motorsports	Chevrolet
26	0	Jeffrey Earnhardt	JD Motorsports	Chevrolet
27	23	Andy Lally	Our Motorsports	Chevrolet
28	99	Ryan Ellis	B. J. McLeod Motorsports	Ford
29	8	Miguel Paludo	JR Motorsports	Chevrolet
30	15	Colby Howard	JD Motorsports	Chevrolet
31	31	Josh Berry (R)	Jordan Anderson Racing	Chevrolet
32	5	Matt Mills	B. J. McLeod Motorsports	Chevrolet
33	26	Kris Wright (i)	Sam Hunt Racing	Toyota
34	66	Matt Jaskol	MBM Motorsports	Toyota
35	47	Kyle Weatherman	Mike Harmon Racing	Chevrolet
36	61	David Starr	Hattori Racing Enterprises	Toyota
37	07	Joe Graf Jr.	SS-Green Light Racing	Chevrolet
38	74	Bayley Currey (i)	Mike Harmon Racing	Chevrolet
39	90	Preston Pardus	DGM Racing	Ford
40	52	Gray Gaulding	Means Motorsports	Chevrolet
Official qualifying results

== Race ==
=== Race results ===
==== Stage Results ====
Stage One Laps: 25

Pos	No	Driver	Team	Manufacturer	Points
1	16	A. J. Allmendinger	Kaulig Racing	Chevrolet	10
2	22	Austin Cindric	Team Penske	Ford	9
3	11	Justin Haley	Kaulig Racing	Chevrolet	8
4	10	Jeb Burton	Kaulig Racing	Chevrolet	7
5	7	Justin Allgaier	JR Motorsports	Chevrolet	6
6	19	Brandon Jones	Joe Gibbs Racing	Toyota	5
7	98	Riley Herbst	Stewart-Haas Racing	Ford	4
8	36	Alex Labbé	DGM Racing	Chevrolet	3
9	1	Michael Annett	JR Motorsports	Chevrolet	2
10	51	Jeremy Clements	Jeremy Clements Racing	Chevrolet	1

Stage Two Laps: 45

Pos	No	Driver	Team	Manufacturer	Points
1	11	Justin Haley	Kaulig Racing	Chevrolet	10
2	19	Brandon Jones	Joe Gibbs Racing	Toyota	9
3	10	Jeb Burton	Joe Gibbs Racing	Chevrolet	8
4	98	Riley Herbst	Stewart-Haas Racing	Ford	7
5	22	Austin Cindric	Team Penske	Ford	6
6	36	Alex Labbé	DGM Racing	Chevrolet	5
7	2	Myatt Snider	Richard Childress Racing	Chevrolet	4
8	68	Brandon Brown	Brandonbilt Motorsports	Chevrolet	3
9	1	Michael Annett	JR Motorsports	Chevrolet	2
10	99	Ryan Ellis	B. J. McLeod Motorsports	Ford	1

=== Final Stage Results ===
Laps: 25

Pos	Grid	No	Driver	Team	Manufacturer	Laps	Points	Status
1	12	16	A. J. Allmendinger	Kaulig Racing	Chevrolet	78	50	Running
2	10	11	Justin Haley	Kaulig Racing	Chevrolet	78	53	Running
3	2	54	Ty Gibbs (R)	Joe Gibbs Racing	Toyota	78	34	Running
4	7	19	Brandon Jones	Joe Gibbs Racing	Toyota	78	47	Running
5	27	23	Andy Lally	Our Motorsports	Chevrolet	78	32	Running
6	6	68	Brandon Brown	Brandonbilt Motorsports	Chevrolet	78	34	Running
7	15	1	Michael Annett	JR Motorsports	Chevrolet	78	34	Running
8	31	31	Josh Berry (R)	Jordan Anderson Racing	Chevrolet	78	29	Running
9	23	39	Ryan Sieg	RSS Racing	Ford	78	28	Running
10	24	92	Josh Williams	DGM Racing	Chevrolet	78	27	Running
11	16	36	Alex Labbé	Dgm Racing	Chevrolet	78	34	Running
12	11	18	Daniel Hemric	Joe Gibbs Racing	Toyota	78	25	Running
13	19	48	Jade Buford (R)	Big Machine Racing Team	Chevrolet	78	24	Running
14	1	22	Austin Cindric	Team Penske	Ford	78	38	Running
15	21	17	Cody Ware	SS-Green Light Racing with Rick Ware Racing	Ford	78	22	Running
16	4	10	Jeb Burton	Kaulig Racing	Chevrolet	78	36	Running
17	40	52	Gray Gaulding	Means Motorsports	Chevrolet	78	20	Running
18	17	4	Ryan Vargas (R)	JD Motorsports	Chevrolet	78	19	Running
19	34	66	Matt Jaskol	MBM Motorsports	Toyota	78	18	Running
20	20	6	Landon Cassill	JD Motorsports	Chevrolet	78	17	Running
21	9	98	Riley Herbst	Stewart-Haas Racing	Ford	78	27	Running
22	30	15	Colby Howard	JD Motorsports	Chevrolet	78	15	Running
23	32	5	Matt Mills	B. J. McLeod Motorsports	Chevrolet	78	14	Running
24	22	78	Jesse Little	B. J. McLeod Motorsports	Chevrolet	78	13	Running
25	39	90	Preston Pardus	DGM Racing	Ford	78	12	Running
26	35	47	Kyle Weatherman	Mike Harmon Racing	Chevrolet	78	11	Running
27	29	8	Miguel Paludo	JR Motorsports	Chevrolet	78	10	Running
28	28	99	Ryan Ellis	B. J. McLeod Motorsports	Ford	78	9	Running
29	14	2	Myatt Snider	Richard Childress Racing	Chevrolet	78	12	Running
30	37	07	Joe Graf Jr.	SS-Green Light Racing	Chevrolet	77	7	Running
31	18	02	Brett Moffitt	Our Motorsports	Chevrolet	75	6	Fuel Pump
32	33	26	Kris Wright (i)	Sam Hunt Racing	Toyota	71	0	Accident
33	8	51	Jeremy Clements	Jeremy Clements Racing	Chevrolet	68	5	Running
34	26	0	Jeffrey Earnhardt	DGM Racing	Chevrolet	68	3	Running
35	5	7	Justin Allgaier	JR Motorsports	Chevrolet	67	8	Running
36	36	61	David Starr	Hattori Racing Enterprises	Toyota	66	0	Accident
37	38	74	Bayley Currey (i)	Mike Harmon Racing	Chevrolet	30	0	Electrical
38	3	20	Harrison Burton	Joe Gibbs Racing	Toyota	19	1	Accident
39	25	44	Tommy Joe Martins	Martins Motorsports	Chevrolet	7	1	Engine
40	13	9	Noah Gragson	JR Motorsports	Chevrolet	0	1	Accident
Official race results

=== Race statistics ===
- Lead changes: 7 among 5 different drivers
- Cautions/Laps: 7 for 23
- Time of race: 2 hours, 39 minutes, and 36 seconds
- Average speed: 66.212 mph (106.558 km/h)

Previous race: 2021 Alsco Uniforms 300	NASCAR Xfinity Series; 2021 season	Next race: 2021 Alsco Uniforms 250
