= 2022 NASCAR Xfinity Series =

American motorsport season

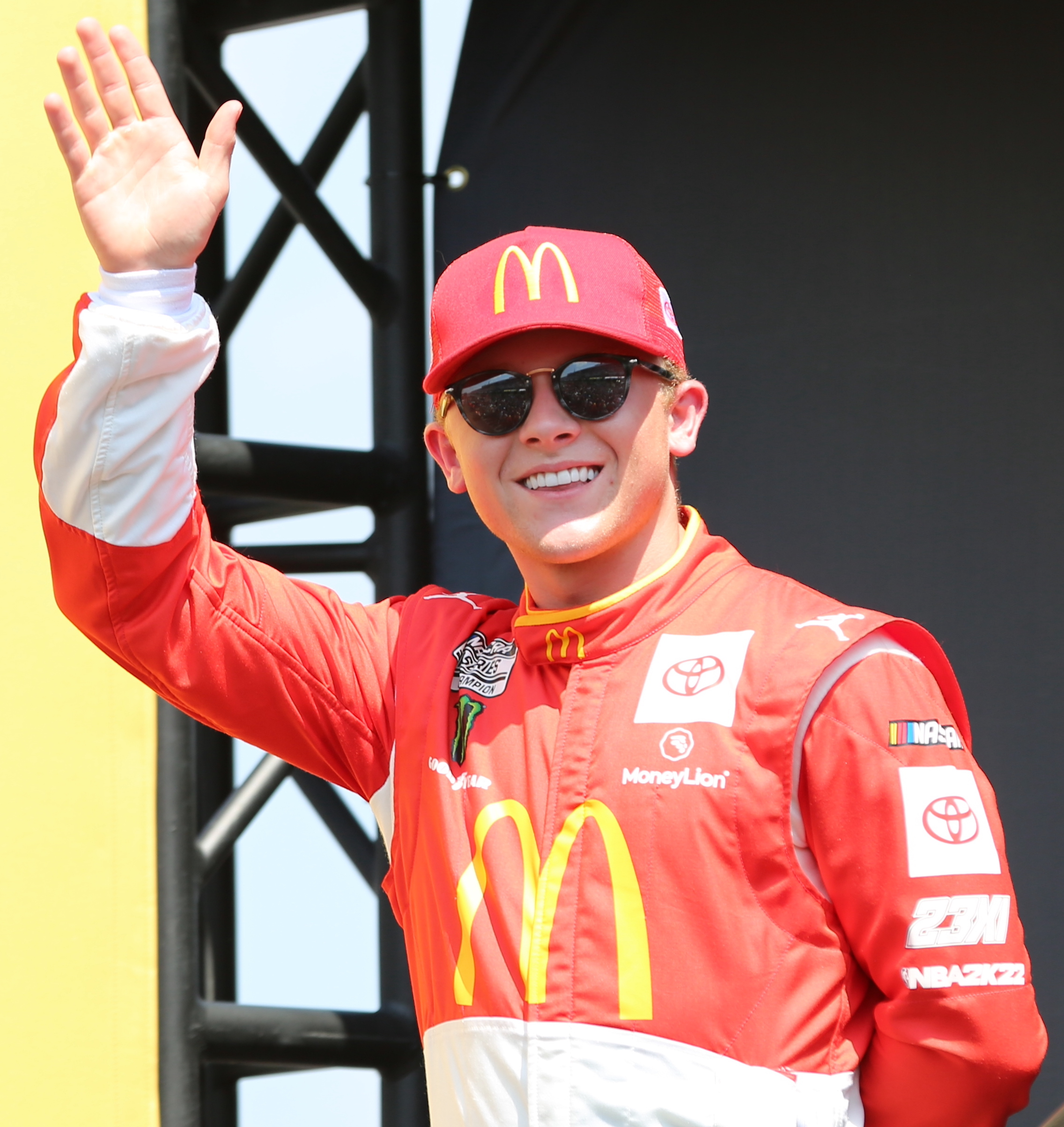
Ty Gibbs, the 2022 Xfinity Series champion.

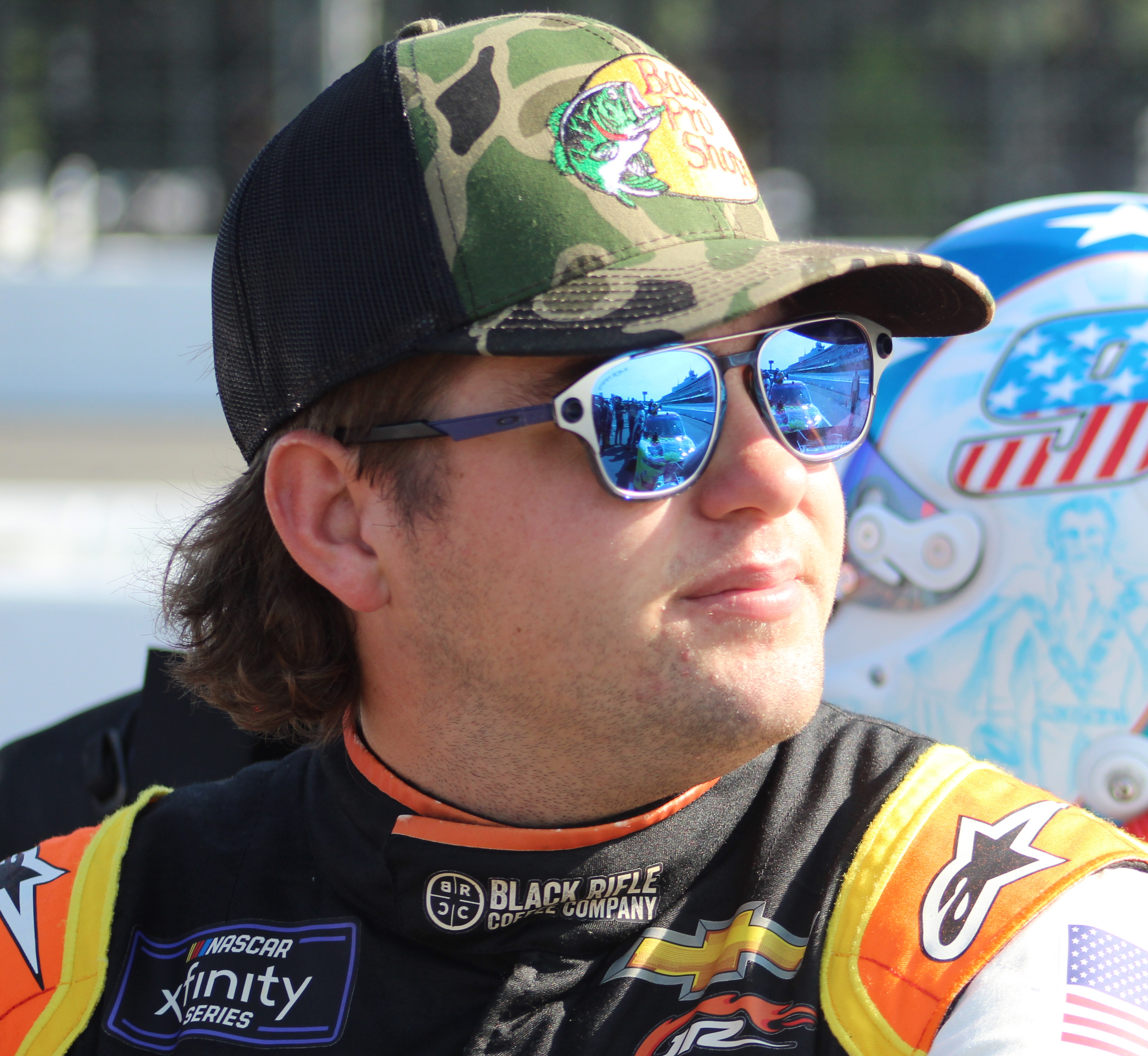
Noah Gragson finished second behind Gibbs in the championship.

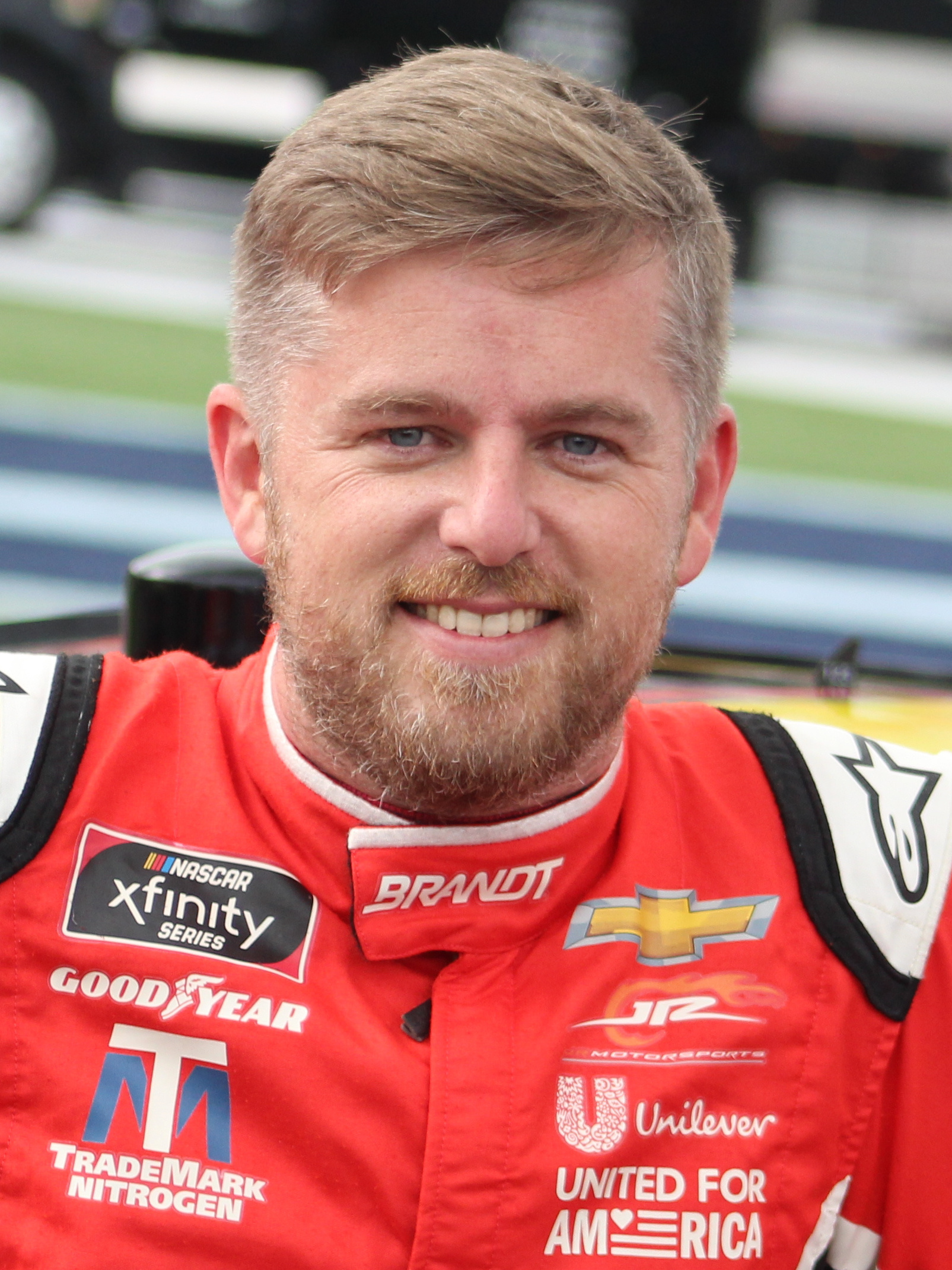
Justin Allgaier finished third in the championship.

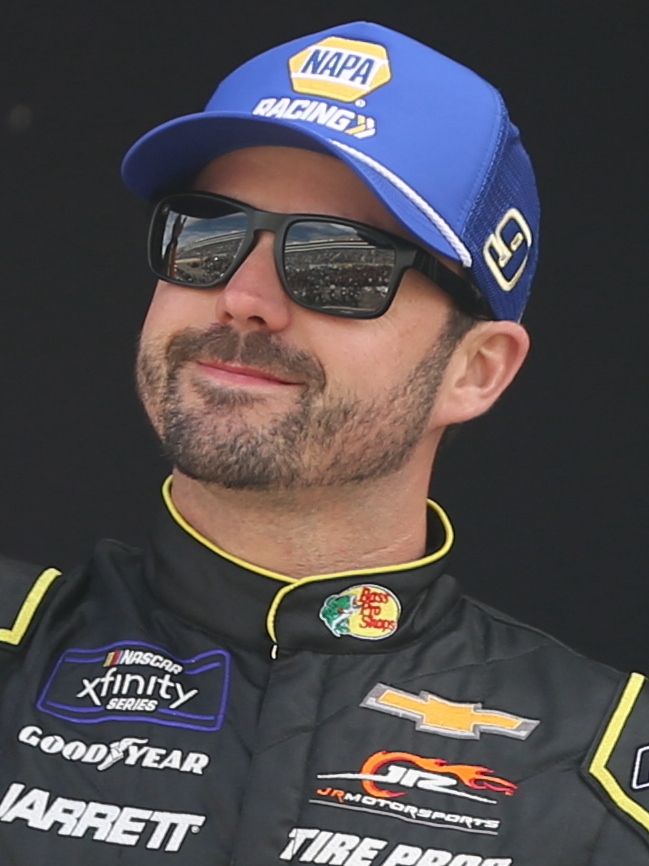
Josh Berry finished fourth in the championship.

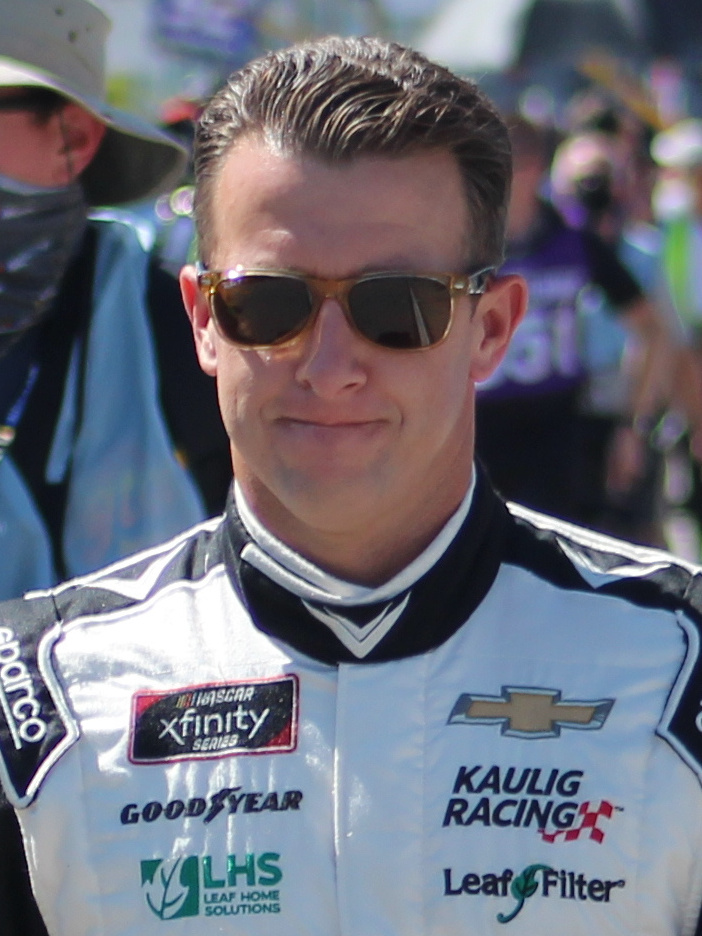
A. J. Allmendinger won the regular season championship, but finished fifth in the playoffs.

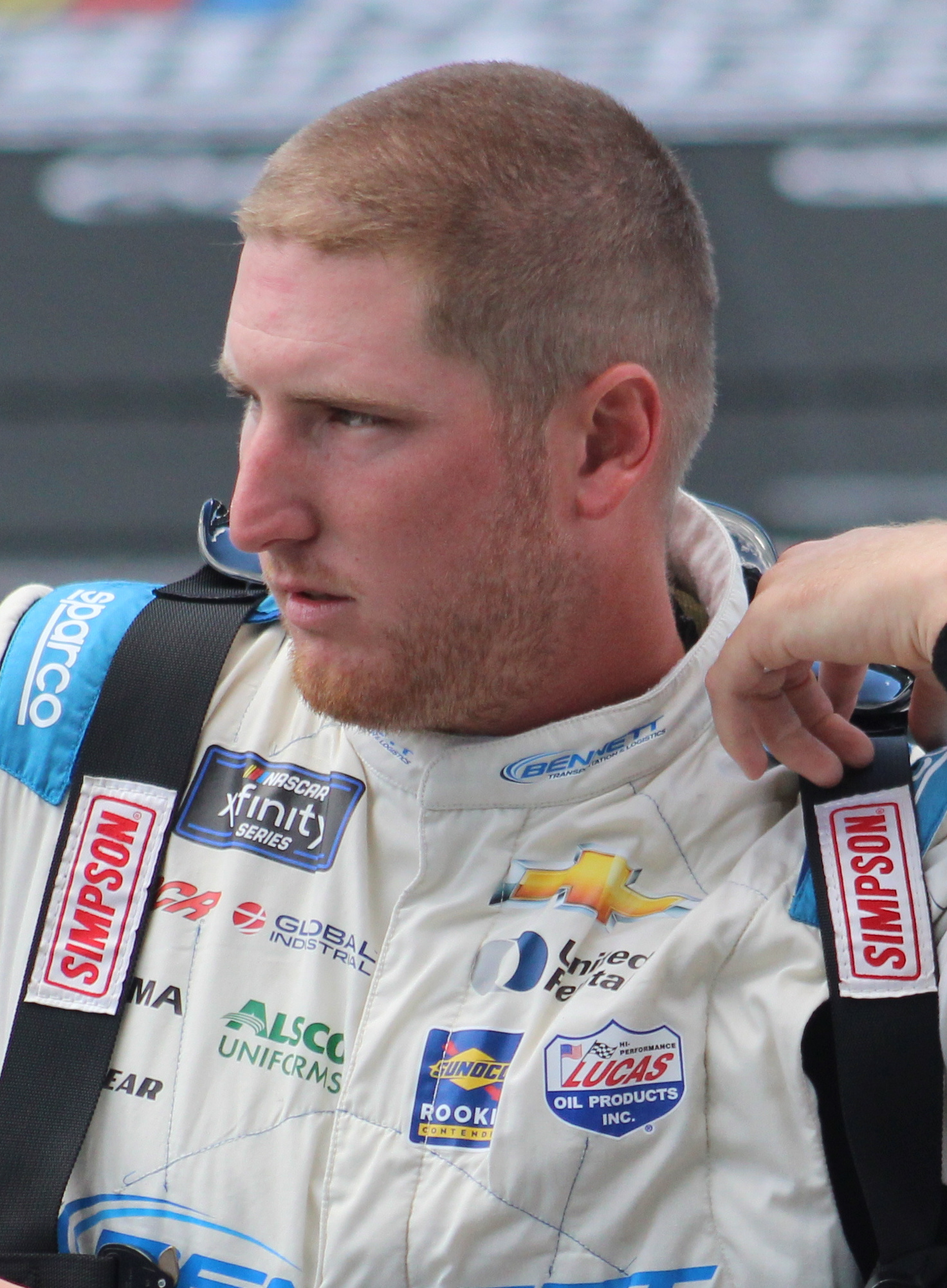
Austin Hill, the 2022 NASCAR Xfinity Series Rookie of the Year.

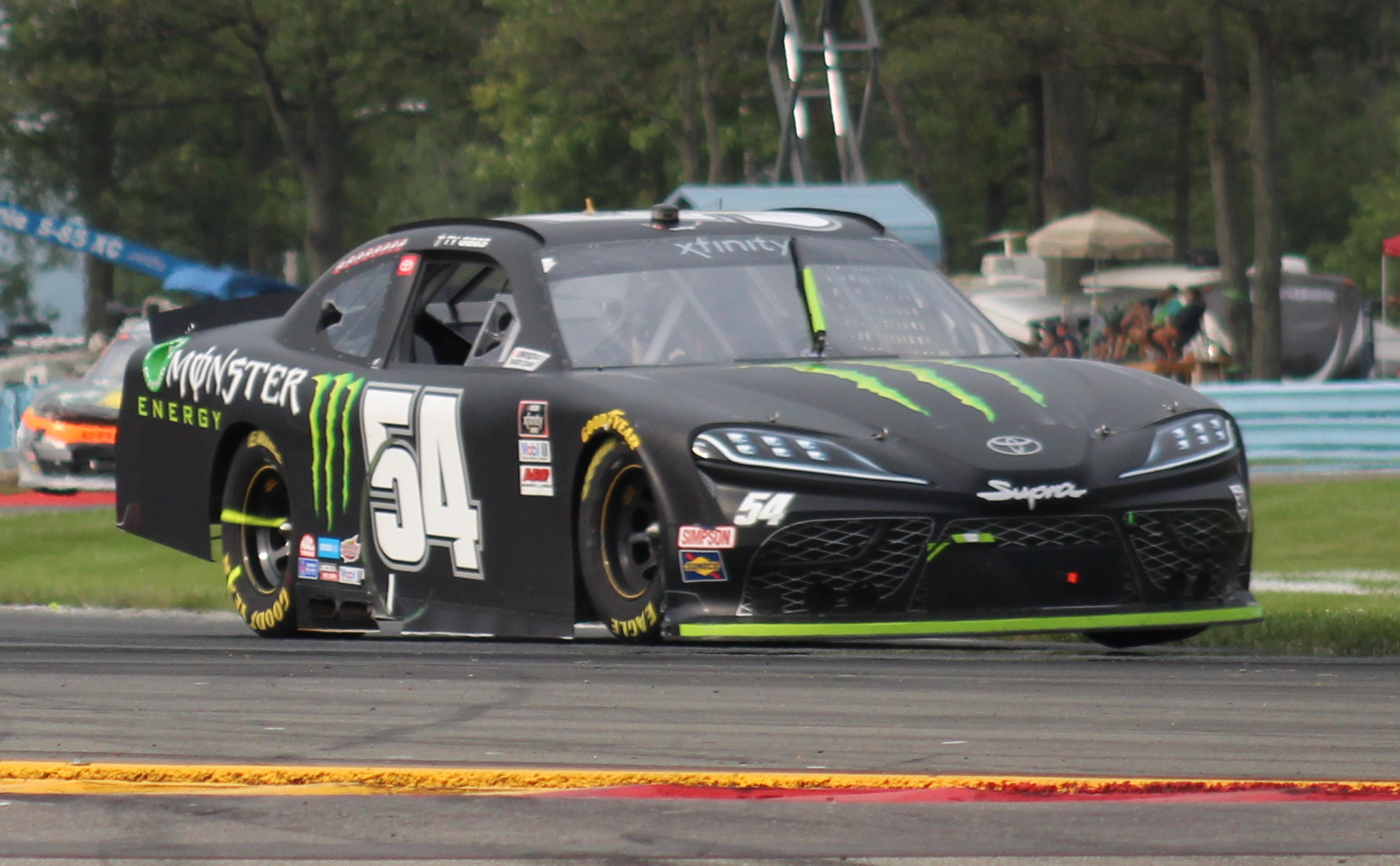
The Joe Gibbs Racing No. 54 car driven by Ty Gibbs won the owners' championship.

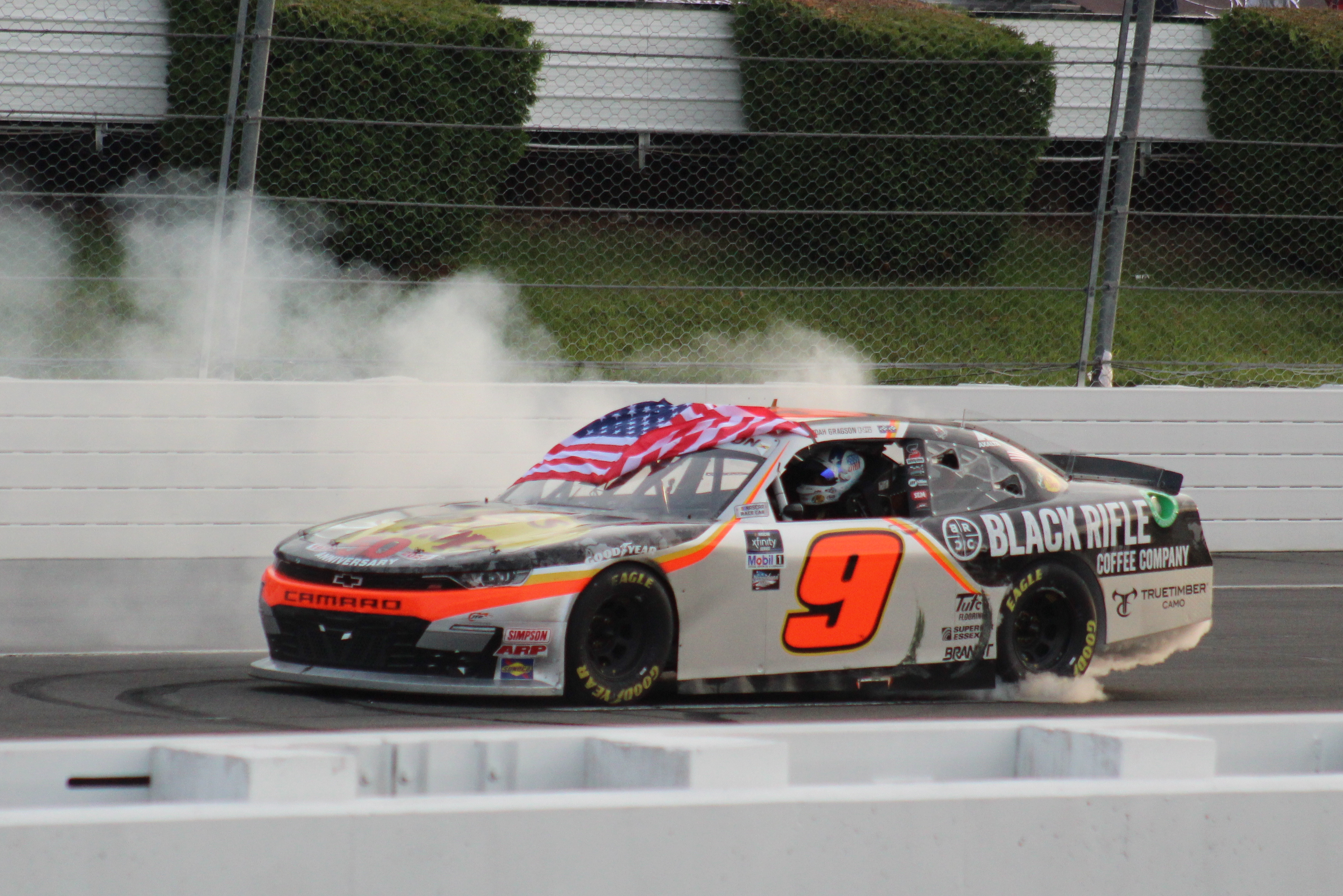
Chevrolet won the Xfinity Series manufacturers' championship with 1274 points and 24 wins.

The 2022 NASCAR Xfinity Series was the 41st season of the NASCAR Xfinity Series, a stock car racing series sanctioned by NASCAR in the United States. The season started with the Beef. It's What's for Dinner. 300 on February 19 at Daytona International Speedway and ended with the NASCAR Xfinity Series Championship Race on November 5 at Phoenix Raceway.

Daniel Hemric entered the season as the defending champion and attempted to become the second driver in series history to win back-to-back championships driving for two different teams. (The first was Tyler Reddick in 2018 and 2019, who drove for JR Motorsports and Richard Childress Racing in those years respectively.) Hemric drove the No. 18 car for Joe Gibbs Racing in 2021, but moved to the No. 11 car for Kaulig Racing in 2022. Hemric once again made the Playoffs but was eliminated after the Round of 12.

The Xfinity Series logo also changed from red to purple in 2022 to reflect a similar change in the logo of series title sponsor Xfinity.

Following the 2022 Food City 300 at Bristol, A. J. Allmendinger of Kaulig Racing clinched the regular season championship. After the 2022 Alsco Uniforms 302 at Las Vegas, Chevrolet won the manufacturers' championship. Ty Gibbs won the 2022 NASCAR Xfinity Series Championship, while Joe Gibbs Racing won its fourth championship. It was also JGR's second NXS Championship in a row. Austin Hill of Richard Childress Racing won the 2022 NASCAR Xfinity Series Rookie of the Year honors.

== Teams and drivers ==
=== Complete schedule ===
Manufacturer	Team	No.	Race driver	Crew chief
Chevrolet	Alpha Prime Racing	44	Tommy Joe Martins 3	Dan Stillman 7 Frank Kerr 3 Michael Brandt 23
Chevrolet	Alpha Prime Racing	44	Ryan Ellis 10	Dan Stillman 7 Frank Kerr 3 Michael Brandt 23
Chevrolet	Alpha Prime Racing	44	Sage Karam 4	Dan Stillman 7 Frank Kerr 3 Michael Brandt 23
Chevrolet	Alpha Prime Racing	44	Rajah Caruth 6	Dan Stillman 7 Frank Kerr 3 Michael Brandt 23
Chevrolet	Alpha Prime Racing	44	Howie DiSavino III 4	Dan Stillman 7 Frank Kerr 3 Michael Brandt 23
Chevrolet	Alpha Prime Racing	44	Josh Bilicki 3	Dan Stillman 7 Frank Kerr 3 Michael Brandt 23
Chevrolet	Alpha Prime Racing	44	Andy Lally 1	Dan Stillman 7 Frank Kerr 3 Michael Brandt 23
Chevrolet	Alpha Prime Racing	44	Stefan Parsons 1	Dan Stillman 7 Frank Kerr 3 Michael Brandt 23
Chevrolet	Alpha Prime Racing	44	Julia Landauer 1	Dan Stillman 7 Frank Kerr 3 Michael Brandt 23
Chevrolet	Alpha Prime Racing	45	Caesar Bacarella 5	Paul Clapprood 7 Michael Brandt 3 Frank Kerr 23
Chevrolet	Alpha Prime Racing	45	Kaz Grala 3	Paul Clapprood 7 Michael Brandt 3 Frank Kerr 23
Chevrolet	Alpha Prime Racing	45	Tommy Joe Martins 2	Paul Clapprood 7 Michael Brandt 3 Frank Kerr 23
Chevrolet	Alpha Prime Racing	45	Josh Bilicki 3	Paul Clapprood 7 Michael Brandt 3 Frank Kerr 23
Chevrolet	Alpha Prime Racing	45	Howie DiSavino III 2	Paul Clapprood 7 Michael Brandt 3 Frank Kerr 23
Chevrolet	Alpha Prime Racing	45	Ryan Ellis 2	Paul Clapprood 7 Michael Brandt 3 Frank Kerr 23
Chevrolet	Alpha Prime Racing	45	Stefan Parsons 11	Paul Clapprood 7 Michael Brandt 3 Frank Kerr 23
Chevrolet	Alpha Prime Racing	45	Sage Karam 3	Paul Clapprood 7 Michael Brandt 3 Frank Kerr 23
Chevrolet	Alpha Prime Racing	45	Julia Landauer 1	Paul Clapprood 7 Michael Brandt 3 Frank Kerr 23
Chevrolet	Alpha Prime Racing	45	Rajah Caruth 1	Paul Clapprood 7 Michael Brandt 3 Frank Kerr 23
Chevrolet	Big Machine Racing	48	Jade Buford 9	Patrick Donahue
Chevrolet	Big Machine Racing	48	Kaz Grala 5	Patrick Donahue
Chevrolet	Big Machine Racing	48	Tyler Reddick 5	Patrick Donahue
Chevrolet	Big Machine Racing	48	Austin Dillon 1	Patrick Donahue
Chevrolet	Big Machine Racing	48	Ty Dillon 1	Patrick Donahue
Chevrolet	Big Machine Racing	48	Ricky Stenhouse Jr. 2	Patrick Donahue
Chevrolet	Big Machine Racing	48	Ross Chastain 2	Patrick Donahue
Chevrolet	Big Machine Racing	48	Nick Sanchez 6	Patrick Donahue
Chevrolet	Big Machine Racing	48	Parker Kligerman 1	Patrick Donahue
Chevrolet	Big Machine Racing	48	Marco Andretti 1	Patrick Donahue
Chevrolet	Brandonbilt Motorsports	68	Brandon Brown 23	Doug Randolph
Chevrolet	Brandonbilt Motorsports	68	Austin Dillon 1	Doug Randolph
Chevrolet	Brandonbilt Motorsports	68	Kris Wright 9	Doug Randolph
Chevrolet	DGM Racing	36	Josh Bilicki 1	George Gorham Jr. 1 Corey Cashman 2 Ryan London 2 Mario Gosselin 1 Nathan Kennedy 27
Chevrolet	DGM Racing	36	Alex Labbé 24	George Gorham Jr. 1 Corey Cashman 2 Ryan London 2 Mario Gosselin 1 Nathan Kennedy 27
Chevrolet	DGM Racing	36	Garrett Smithley 1	George Gorham Jr. 1 Corey Cashman 2 Ryan London 2 Mario Gosselin 1 Nathan Kennedy 27
Chevrolet	DGM Racing	36	Josh Williams 7	George Gorham Jr. 1 Corey Cashman 2 Ryan London 2 Mario Gosselin 1 Nathan Kennedy 27
Chevrolet	DGM Racing	91	Mason Massey 27	Mario Gosselin 28; Dan Pardus 5
Chevrolet	DGM Racing	91	Preston Pardus 5	Mario Gosselin 28; Dan Pardus 5
Chevrolet	DGM Racing	91	Mason Filippi 1	Mario Gosselin 28; Dan Pardus 5
Chevrolet	JD Motorsports	4	Bayley Currey	Wayne Carroll Jr.
Chevrolet	JD Motorsports	6	Ryan Vargas 25	Kase Kallenbach 28; Alex Bird 5
Chevrolet	JD Motorsports	6	Gray Gaulding 1	Kase Kallenbach 28; Alex Bird 5
Chevrolet	JD Motorsports	6	Ty Dillon 2	Kase Kallenbach 28; Alex Bird 5
Chevrolet	JD Motorsports	6	Spencer Pumpelly 1	Kase Kallenbach 28; Alex Bird 5
Chevrolet	JD Motorsports	6	Bobby McCarty 1	Kase Kallenbach 28; Alex Bird 5
Chevrolet	JD Motorsports	6	Brennan Poole 3	Kase Kallenbach 28; Alex Bird 5
Chevrolet	Jeremy Clements Racing	51	Jeremy Clements	Mark Setzer 32; Tony Clements 1
Chevrolet	Jesse Iwuji Motorsports	34	Jesse Iwuji (R) 13 (Note: At Texas in May (race #12), Road America (race #16) and Kansas II (race #25), Weatherman qualified the car before being replaced by Iwuji in the race.)	Jason Houghtaling 8 Dan Stillman 25
Chevrolet	Jesse Iwuji Motorsports	34	Jesse Little 1	Jason Houghtaling 8 Dan Stillman 25
Chevrolet	Jesse Iwuji Motorsports	34	Kyle Weatherman 18	Jason Houghtaling 8 Dan Stillman 25
Chevrolet	Jesse Iwuji Motorsports	34	Kaz Grala 1	Jason Houghtaling 8 Dan Stillman 25
Chevrolet	Jordan Anderson Racing	31	Myatt Snider	Shane Whitbeck
Chevrolet	JR Motorsports	1	Sam Mayer	Taylor Moyer 29; Andrew Overstreet 4
Chevrolet	JR Motorsports	7	Justin Allgaier	Jason Burdett
Chevrolet	JR Motorsports	8	Josh Berry	Mike Bumgarner
Chevrolet	JR Motorsports	9	Noah Gragson	Luke Lambert
Chevrolet	Kaulig Racing	10	Landon Cassill	Jason Trinchere 24; Alex Yontz 9
Chevrolet	Kaulig Racing	11	Daniel Hemric	Alex Yontz 24; Jason Trinchere 9
Chevrolet	Kaulig Racing	16	A. J. Allmendinger	Bruce Schlicker
Chevrolet	Our Motorsports	02	Brett Moffitt 20	Kris Bowen
Chevrolet	Our Motorsports	02	Blaine Perkins 5	Kris Bowen
Chevrolet	Our Motorsports	02	Ty Dillon 1	Kris Bowen
Chevrolet	Our Motorsports	02	Brandon Brown 1	Kris Bowen
Chevrolet	Our Motorsports	02	Sage Karam 2	Kris Bowen
Chevrolet	Our Motorsports	02	Parker Retzlaff 4	Kris Bowen
Chevrolet	Our Motorsports	23	Anthony Alfredo	Pat Tryson
Chevrolet	Our Motorsports	27	Jeb Burton	Chad Walter
Chevrolet	Richard Childress Racing	2	Sheldon Creed (R)	Jeff Stankiewicz 29; Jim Pohlman 4
Chevrolet	Richard Childress Racing	21	Austin Hill (R)	Andy Street
Ford	RSS Racing	39	Ryan Sieg 32 (Note: Ryan Sieg is running the full season split between the Nos. 39 and 38 RSS Racing cars.)	Kevin Starland
Ford	RSS Racing	39	Kyle Sieg (R) 1	Andrew May
Ford	SS-Green Light Racing	07	Joe Graf Jr. 25	Joe Williams Jr.
Ford	SS-Green Light Racing	07	Cole Custer 5	Joe Williams Jr.
Ford	SS-Green Light Racing	07	Chase Briscoe 1	Joe Williams Jr.
Ford	SS-Green Light Racing	07	Brett Moffitt 1	Joe Williams Jr.
Ford	SS-Green Light Racing	07	Hailie Deegan 1	Joe Williams Jr.
Ford	SS-Green Light Racing	08	David Starr 23	Jason Miller 32; Jeff Kirkendall 1
Ford	SS-Green Light Racing	08	Joe Graf Jr. 2	Jason Miller 32; Jeff Kirkendall 1
Ford	SS-Green Light Racing	08	Spencer Pumpelly 1	Jason Miller 32; Jeff Kirkendall 1
Ford	SS-Green Light Racing	08	B. J. McLeod 1	Jason Miller 32; Jeff Kirkendall 1
Ford	SS-Green Light Racing	08	Andy Lally 4	Jason Miller 32; Jeff Kirkendall 1
Ford	SS-Green Light Racing	08	Brandon Brown 2	Jason Miller 32; Jeff Kirkendall 1
Ford	Stewart–Haas Racing	98	Riley Herbst	Richard Boswell
Toyota	Joe Gibbs Racing	18	Drew Dollar 2	Jason Ratcliff
Toyota	Joe Gibbs Racing	18	Trevor Bayne 9	Jason Ratcliff
Toyota	Joe Gibbs Racing	18	Ryan Truex 5	Jason Ratcliff
Toyota	Joe Gibbs Racing	18	Bubba Wallace 2	Jason Ratcliff
Toyota	Joe Gibbs Racing	18	John Hunter Nemechek 3	Jason Ratcliff
Toyota	Joe Gibbs Racing	18	Connor Mosack 1	Jason Ratcliff
Toyota	Joe Gibbs Racing	18	Sammy Smith 9	Jason Ratcliff
Toyota	Joe Gibbs Racing	18	Christopher Bell 1	Jason Ratcliff
Toyota	Joe Gibbs Racing	18	James Davison 1	Jason Ratcliff
Toyota	Joe Gibbs Racing	19	Brandon Jones	Jeff Meendering
Toyota	Joe Gibbs Racing	54	Ty Gibbs	Chris Gayle
Toyota	Sam Hunt Racing	26	Ryan Truex 1	Allen Hart
Toyota	Sam Hunt Racing	26	Jeffrey Earnhardt 8	Allen Hart
Toyota	Sam Hunt Racing	26	John Hunter Nemechek 8	Allen Hart
Toyota	Sam Hunt Racing	26	Parker Chase 2	Allen Hart
Toyota	Sam Hunt Racing	26	Derek Griffith 6	Allen Hart
Toyota	Sam Hunt Racing	26	Chandler Smith 3	Allen Hart
Toyota	Sam Hunt Racing	26	Santino Ferrucci 2	Allen Hart
Toyota	Sam Hunt Racing	26	Connor Mosack 1	Allen Hart
Toyota	Sam Hunt Racing	26	Daniil Kvyat 1	Allen Hart
Toyota	Sam Hunt Racing	26	Kaz Grala 1	Allen Hart
Chevrolet 27 Ford 6	B. J. McLeod Motorsports	5	Matt Mills 15	George Ingram 26; Keith Wolfe 1 Mike Tyska 4
Chevrolet 27 Ford 6	B. J. McLeod Motorsports	5	Nick Sanchez 1	George Ingram 26; Keith Wolfe 1 Mike Tyska 4
Chevrolet 27 Ford 6	B. J. McLeod Motorsports	5	Scott Heckert 4	George Ingram 26; Keith Wolfe 1 Mike Tyska 4
Chevrolet 27 Ford 6	B. J. McLeod Motorsports	5	Ryan Preece 3 (Note: Entries are fielded in a collaboration with Stewart–Haas Racing.)	George Ingram 26; Keith Wolfe 1 Mike Tyska 4
Chevrolet 27 Ford 6	B. J. McLeod Motorsports	5	Joe Graf Jr. 1 (Note: Entry was fielded in a collaboration with SS-Green Light Racing.)	George Ingram 26; Keith Wolfe 1 Mike Tyska 4
Chevrolet 27 Ford 6	B. J. McLeod Motorsports	5	Josh Williams 3 (Note: After Williams failed to qualify for the race at Daytona II (race 23) in the DGM Racing No. 92, he replaced Patrick Emerling in the B. J. McLeod Motorsports No. 5 in the race.) (Note: The entries at Daytona in August (race 23) and Talladega in October (race 28) were fielded in a collaboration with Emerling-Gase Motorsports.)	George Ingram 26; Keith Wolfe 1 Mike Tyska 4
Chevrolet 27 Ford 6	B. J. McLeod Motorsports	5	Stefan Parsons 1	George Ingram 26; Keith Wolfe 1 Mike Tyska 4
Chevrolet 27 Ford 6	B. J. McLeod Motorsports	5	Brandon Brown 2	George Ingram 26; Keith Wolfe 1 Mike Tyska 4
Chevrolet 27 Ford 6	B. J. McLeod Motorsports	5	Patrick Emerling 1	George Ingram 26; Keith Wolfe 1 Mike Tyska 4
Chevrolet 27 Ford 6	B. J. McLeod Motorsports	5	Tommy Joe Martins 1	George Ingram 26; Keith Wolfe 1 Mike Tyska 4
Chevrolet 27 Ford 6	B. J. McLeod Motorsports	5	Garrett Smithley 1	George Ingram 26; Keith Wolfe 1 Mike Tyska 4
Chevrolet 27 Ford 6	B. J. McLeod Motorsports	5	Joey Gase 1	George Ingram 26; Keith Wolfe 1 Mike Tyska 4
Chevrolet 32 Toyota 1	B. J. McLeod Motorsports	78	Josh Williams 19	Danny Johnson 6 Adam Brooks 2 Mike Tyska 20; George Ingram 5
Chevrolet 32 Toyota 1	B. J. McLeod Motorsports	78	Matt Mills 3	Danny Johnson 6 Adam Brooks 2 Mike Tyska 20; George Ingram 5
Chevrolet 32 Toyota 1	B. J. McLeod Motorsports	78	Scott Heckert 1	Danny Johnson 6 Adam Brooks 2 Mike Tyska 20; George Ingram 5
Chevrolet 32 Toyota 1	B. J. McLeod Motorsports	78	Brandon Brown 2	Danny Johnson 6 Adam Brooks 2 Mike Tyska 20; George Ingram 5
Chevrolet 32 Toyota 1	B. J. McLeod Motorsports	78	Stefan Parsons 2	Danny Johnson 6 Adam Brooks 2 Mike Tyska 20; George Ingram 5
Chevrolet 32 Toyota 1	B. J. McLeod Motorsports	78	B. J. McLeod 4	Danny Johnson 6 Adam Brooks 2 Mike Tyska 20; George Ingram 5
Chevrolet 32 Toyota 1	B. J. McLeod Motorsports	78	Garrett Smithley 2	Danny Johnson 6 Adam Brooks 2 Mike Tyska 20; George Ingram 5
Ford 31 Toyota 2	RSS Racing	38	C. J. McLaughlin 12	Steve Addington 26; Andrew May 5 Clifford Turner 1 Kevin Starland 1
Ford 31 Toyota 2	RSS Racing	38	Timmy Hill 1 (Note: Timmy Hill qualified the No. 38 car at Fontana, but after Joe Graf Jr. failed to qualify for the race in his own No. 08 car, he replaced Timmy Hill in the No. 38.)	Steve Addington 26; Andrew May 5 Clifford Turner 1 Kevin Starland 1
Ford 31 Toyota 2	RSS Racing	38	Joe Graf Jr. 1	Steve Addington 26; Andrew May 5 Clifford Turner 1 Kevin Starland 1
Ford 31 Toyota 2	RSS Racing	38	Kyle Sieg (R) 8	Steve Addington 26; Andrew May 5 Clifford Turner 1 Kevin Starland 1
Ford 31 Toyota 2	RSS Racing	38	Parker Retzlaff 4	Steve Addington 26; Andrew May 5 Clifford Turner 1 Kevin Starland 1
Ford 31 Toyota 2	RSS Racing	38	Loris Hezemans 1 (Note: Entries were fielded in a collaboration with Reaume Brothers Racing.)	Steve Addington 26; Andrew May 5 Clifford Turner 1 Kevin Starland 1
Ford 31 Toyota 2	RSS Racing	38	Will Rodgers 1	Steve Addington 26; Andrew May 5 Clifford Turner 1 Kevin Starland 1
Ford 31 Toyota 2	RSS Racing	38	Ryan Sieg 1	Steve Addington 26; Andrew May 5 Clifford Turner 1 Kevin Starland 1
Ford 31 Toyota 2	RSS Racing	38	Darren Dilley 1	Steve Addington 26; Andrew May 5 Clifford Turner 1 Kevin Starland 1
Ford 31 Toyota 2	RSS Racing	38	Patrick Gallagher 4	Steve Addington 26; Andrew May 5 Clifford Turner 1 Kevin Starland 1
Toyota 19 Ford 7 Chevrolet 7	Emerling-Gase Motorsports	35	Shane Lee 4	Scott Eggleston 1 Rick Bourgeois 31; Jim Gase 1
Toyota 19 Ford 7 Chevrolet 7	Emerling-Gase Motorsports	35	Joey Gase 9	Scott Eggleston 1 Rick Bourgeois 31; Jim Gase 1
Toyota 19 Ford 7 Chevrolet 7	Emerling-Gase Motorsports	35	Jeffrey Earnhardt 3	Scott Eggleston 1 Rick Bourgeois 31; Jim Gase 1
Toyota 19 Ford 7 Chevrolet 7	Emerling-Gase Motorsports	35	Parker Kligerman 2	Scott Eggleston 1 Rick Bourgeois 31; Jim Gase 1
Toyota 19 Ford 7 Chevrolet 7	Emerling-Gase Motorsports	35	Patrick Emerling 11	Scott Eggleston 1 Rick Bourgeois 31; Jim Gase 1
Toyota 19 Ford 7 Chevrolet 7	Emerling-Gase Motorsports	35	Chris Dyson 1	Scott Eggleston 1 Rick Bourgeois 31; Jim Gase 1
Toyota 19 Ford 7 Chevrolet 7	Emerling-Gase Motorsports	35	Brad Perez 2	Scott Eggleston 1 Rick Bourgeois 31; Jim Gase 1
Toyota 19 Ford 7 Chevrolet 7	Emerling-Gase Motorsports	35	Dawson Cram 1	Scott Eggleston 1 Rick Bourgeois 31; Jim Gase 1
Chevrolet 5 Toyota 14 Ford 14	MBM Motorsports	66	J. J. Yeley 31	George Church 32; Jason Houghtaling 1
Chevrolet 5 Toyota 14 Ford 14	MBM Motorsports	66	Natalie Decker 1	George Church 32; Jason Houghtaling 1
Chevrolet 5 Toyota 14 Ford 14	MBM Motorsports	66	Timmy Hill 1	George Church 32; Jason Houghtaling 1

=== Limited schedule ===
Manufacturer	Team	No.	Race driver	Crew chief	Rounds
Chevrolet	B. J. McLeod Motorsports	55	Matt Mills	Keith Wolfe 1 Adam Brooks 1	2
Chevrolet	B. J. McLeod Motorsports	99	Stefan Parsons	Mike Tyska 8 Adam Brooks 3 George Ingram 1	10
Chevrolet	B. J. McLeod Motorsports	99	Nick Sanchez	Mike Tyska 8 Adam Brooks 3 George Ingram 1	1
Chevrolet	B. J. McLeod Motorsports	99	Matt Mills	Mike Tyska 8 Adam Brooks 3 George Ingram 1	1
Chevrolet	Bassett Racing	77	Ronnie Bassett Jr.	Ronald Bassett Sr. 4 Dillon Bassett 3 Ronnie Bassett Jr. 2 Shane Wilson 2 Mike Hillman Sr. 3	7
Chevrolet	Bassett Racing	77	Dillon Bassett	Ronald Bassett Sr. 4 Dillon Bassett 3 Ronnie Bassett Jr. 2 Shane Wilson 2 Mike Hillman Sr. 3	7
Chevrolet	DGM Racing	90	Alex Labbé	Ryan London	1
Chevrolet	DGM Racing	90	Mason Filippi	Mike Garvey	1
Chevrolet	DGM Racing	92	Kyle Weatherman	Nathan Kennedy 6 Mario Gosselin 4 Ryan London 4 Mike Hillman Sr. 1 B. J. Tucker 1	5
Chevrolet	DGM Racing	92	Ross Chastain	Nathan Kennedy 6 Mario Gosselin 4 Ryan London 4 Mike Hillman Sr. 1 B. J. Tucker 1	3
Chevrolet	DGM Racing	92	Dexter Bean	Nathan Kennedy 6 Mario Gosselin 4 Ryan London 4 Mike Hillman Sr. 1 B. J. Tucker 1	1
Chevrolet	DGM Racing	92	Josh Williams	Nathan Kennedy 6 Mario Gosselin 4 Ryan London 4 Mike Hillman Sr. 1 B. J. Tucker 1	4
Chevrolet	DGM Racing	92	Alex Labbé	Nathan Kennedy 6 Mario Gosselin 4 Ryan London 4 Mike Hillman Sr. 1 B. J. Tucker 1	3
Chevrolet	Kaulig Racing	14	Justin Haley	Justin Cox	1
Chevrolet	Hendrick Motorsports	17	Kyle Larson	Kevin Meendering	2
Chevrolet	Hendrick Motorsports	17	Alex Bowman	Kevin Meendering	1
Chevrolet	Hendrick Motorsports	17	William Byron	Kevin Meendering	1
Chevrolet	Jimmy Means Racing	52	Harrison Rhodes	Tim Brown	4
Chevrolet	Jimmy Means Racing	52	Gar Robinson	Tim Brown	1
Chevrolet	Jimmy Means Racing	52	Brennan Poole	Tim Brown	2
Chevrolet	Jordan Anderson Racing	32	Jordan Anderson	Arthur Haire	1
Chevrolet	Jordan Anderson Racing	32	Austin Wayne Self	Jamie Jones	2
Chevrolet	JR Motorsports	88	Miguel Paludo	Jason Stockert	3
Chevrolet	JR Motorsports	88	Dale Earnhardt Jr.	Jason Stockert	1
Chevrolet	JR Motorsports	88	Chase Elliott	Jason Stockert	1
Chevrolet	JR Motorsports	88	William Byron	Jason Stockert	2
Chevrolet	JR Motorsports	88	Kyle Larson	Jason Stockert	1
Chevrolet	Mike Harmon Racing	47	Gray Gaulding	Ryan Bell	3
Chevrolet	Mike Harmon Racing	47	Brennan Poole	Ryan Bell	17
Chevrolet	Mike Harmon Racing	47	Ryan Vargas	Ryan Bell	2
Chevrolet	Mike Harmon Racing	47	Bobby McCarty	Ryan Bell	1
Chevrolet	Mike Harmon Racing	47	Brandon Brown	Ryan Bell	1
Chevrolet	Mike Harmon Racing	47	Stanton Barrett	Ryan Bell	1
Chevrolet	Mike Harmon Racing	47	Tim Viens	Ryan Bell	1
Chevrolet	Mike Harmon Racing	47	Dawson Cram	Ryan Bell	2
Chevrolet	Mike Harmon Racing	47	Mike Harmon	Ryan Bell	1
Chevrolet	Mike Harmon Racing	74	Tim Viens	Carl Brown	1
Chevrolet	Richard Childress Racing	3	Jeffrey Earnhardt	Larry McReynolds	1
Ford	Emerling-Gase Motorsports	53	Joey Gase	Rick Bourgeois	1
Ford	Emerling-Gase Motorsports	53	Shane Lee	Mike Hillman Jr.	1
Ford	RSS Racing	28	Kyle Sieg (R)	Andrew May 7 Steve Addington 6 Kevin Johnson 1 Clifford Turner 1	9
Ford	RSS Racing	28	C. J. McLaughlin	Andrew May 7 Steve Addington 6 Kevin Johnson 1 Clifford Turner 1	3
Ford	RSS Racing	28	Patrick Gallagher	Andrew May 7 Steve Addington 6 Kevin Johnson 1 Clifford Turner 1	1
Ford	RSS Racing	28	Natalie Decker	Andrew May 7 Steve Addington 6 Kevin Johnson 1 Clifford Turner 1	1
Ford	RSS Racing	28	Parker Retzlaff	Andrew May 7 Steve Addington 6 Kevin Johnson 1 Clifford Turner 1	1
Toyota	Reaume Brothers Racing	33	Natalie Decker	Josh Reaume 1 Andrew Abbott 2	1
Toyota	Reaume Brothers Racing	33	Will Rodgers	Josh Reaume 1 Andrew Abbott 2	1
Toyota	Reaume Brothers Racing	33	Loris Hezemans	Josh Reaume 1 Andrew Abbott 2	1
Toyota	Sam Hunt Racing	24	Jeffrey Earnhardt	Andrew Abbott	1
Toyota	Sam Hunt Racing	24	Joe Nemechek	Eric Phillips	1
Toyota 21 Ford 5 Chevrolet 2	MBM Motorsports	13	Stan Mullis	Carl Long 9 Kody Clark 1 George Church 1 Jason Houghtaling 17	2
Toyota 21 Ford 5 Chevrolet 2	MBM Motorsports	13	Chad Finchum	Carl Long 9 Kody Clark 1 George Church 1 Jason Houghtaling 17	6
Toyota 21 Ford 5 Chevrolet 2	MBM Motorsports	13	Natalie Decker	Carl Long 9 Kody Clark 1 George Church 1 Jason Houghtaling 17	2
Toyota 21 Ford 5 Chevrolet 2	MBM Motorsports	13	Timmy Hill	Carl Long 9 Kody Clark 1 George Church 1 Jason Houghtaling 17	8
Toyota 21 Ford 5 Chevrolet 2	MBM Motorsports	13	Matt Jaskol	Carl Long 9 Kody Clark 1 George Church 1 Jason Houghtaling 17	2
Toyota 21 Ford 5 Chevrolet 2	MBM Motorsports	13	J. J. Yeley	Carl Long 9 Kody Clark 1 George Church 1 Jason Houghtaling 17	1
Toyota 21 Ford 5 Chevrolet 2	MBM Motorsports	13	Will Rodgers	Carl Long 9 Kody Clark 1 George Church 1 Jason Houghtaling 17	1
Toyota 21 Ford 5 Chevrolet 2	MBM Motorsports	13	Akinori Ogata	Carl Long 9 Kody Clark 1 George Church 1 Jason Houghtaling 17	4
Toyota 21 Ford 5 Chevrolet 2	MBM Motorsports	13	Brad Perez	Carl Long 9 Kody Clark 1 George Church 1 Jason Houghtaling 17	1
Toyota 21 Ford 5 Chevrolet 2	MBM Motorsports	13	Dawson Cram	Carl Long 9 Kody Clark 1 George Church 1 Jason Houghtaling 17	1

=== Changes ===
==== Teams ====
- On August 6, 2021, Shane Lee tweeted that he got the equipment from the closed H2 Motorsports team that he drove for in 2019 and was contemplating whether to use it and start his own team or sell the equipment. On November 18, Joey Gase announced that he would start his own team, Joey Gase Racing, fielding the No. 35 Ford/Toyota full-time in 2022 with himself and other drivers sharing the ride. The Toyotas that the team will run were the ones owned by Lee that were last used by H2M. As part of the deal to sell the equipment to Gase, Lee will drive select races in Gase's No. 35. On December 30, it was announced that Patrick Emerling (who drove part-time for Our Motorsports in 2020 and 2021) would join the team as a driver and a co-owner, and as a result, the team was renamed Emerling-Gase Motorsports, and that the team would also field a second part-time car.
- On August 21, 2021, it was announced that NFL Hall of Famer Emmitt Smith and driver Jesse Iwuji would be starting an Xfinity Series team, Jesse Iwuji Motorsports, with Iwuji running the full season and for Rookie of the Year. On February 7, 2022, it was announced that the team would run Chevrolets and share a shop with JD Motorsports, which had extra space available as they reduced from 4 full-time cars to 2 for 2022. The team chose the No. 34 in honor of fellow African American driver Wendell Scott after Team Penske, who cut back to a part-time Xfinity car in 2022, declined to give the team their first choice of car number, the No. 22, Smith's number when he played for the Dallas Cowboys.
- On August 30, 2021, it was announced that Caesar Bacarella, who has driven part-time in the series for B. J. McLeod Motorsports and DGM Racing since 2017, would be joining Martins Motorsports as a driver/co-owner and the team would be renamed Alpha Prime Racing (Alpha Prime is a company he owns). In addition to Bacarella, Tommy Joe Martins, Rajah Caruth, and potentially additional drivers will share the team's No. 44 car for the full season. On January 6, 2022, Alpha Prime Racing announced it will field two full-time teams in 2022, with Sage Karam driving the No. 45 for four races.
- When the Jayski's Silly Season Site 2022 Xfinity Series team/driver chart was released, it was revealed that Big Machine Racing, which fields the No. 48 car for Jade Buford (who will return to the team in 2022) may form an alliance with a larger NASCAR Xfinity Series team. On October 7, 2021, BMRT announced that they would partner with Richard Childress Racing in 2022.
- Miles Thomas Motorsports will debut in 2022. The team will compete part-time in both the Xfinity Series and ARCA Menards Series with Jason Miles, who is also a co-owner of the team. Miles competed part-time in ARCA for Fast Track Racing in 2019 and 2021. Ford will be their manufacturer. The team has yet to announce their car number, sponsors, and crew chief.
- On October 14, 2021, Bob Pockrass from Fox tweeted that Joe Gibbs Racing could downsize from four full-time cars to three in 2022. One of the cars would continue to be for a rotation of drivers like the No. 54 was in 2021. The team lost two of its full-time drivers from 2021, Daniel Hemric, who moved to Kaulig Racing's No. 11 car, and Harrison Burton, who moved up to Wood Brothers Racing in the NASCAR Cup Series, who each bring sponsorship, and the team could not find sponsorship for the No. 54 car in multiple races in 2021. On November 16, JGR officially announced that it would only field 3 full-time Xfinity Series cars in 2022, thus shutting down the No. 20 team, because the No. 54 car would return in 2022 with Ty Gibbs as its full-time driver. It was later turned out the No. 54 was renumbered from the No. 20 after the season ended.
- On October 28, 2021, it was announced that RSS Racing would field two full-time cars again in 2022 with multiple drivers sharing the second car (announced to be the No. 38 on January 17, 2022). After previously fielding three full-time cars in 2018 and 2019 and two in 2020, the team downsized to one car, the No. 39, in 2021. After two drivers of the No. 38, C. J. McLaughlin and Parker Retzlaff, were both announced to be running the race at Bristol in September, it appeared likely that RSS would field a third car in that race. On January 20, 2022, RSS announced that they would field a third car, the No. 28, for Kyle Sieg part-time in 2022.
- On October 29, 2021, it was announced that Richard Childress Racing would field two full-time cars again in 2022, with their second car driven by Austin Hill. On January 21, 2022, RCR revealed on their website that Hill's car number would be the No. 21, which the team has used in the Xfinity Series for many years.
- On November 17, 2021, MBM Motorsports owner Carl Long announced on SiriusXM NASCAR Radio that his team would downsize their Xfinity Series team to one full-time car in 2022. The team previously fielded three full-time cars, the Nos. 13, 61 and 66, with the No. 61 sharing the owner points with Hattori Racing Enterprises.
- On December 16, 2021, Our Motorsports announced that they would be expanding to three full-time cars in 2022. Jeb Burton will drive the team's new third car, the No. 27.
- On December 20, 2021, J. C. Stout (who drove part-time in the Xfinity Series from 2008 to 2010 and the Truck Series from 2003 to 2010) announced that he had bought some Toyotas from Joe Gibbs Racing and would be restarting his team, SQR Development (previously Stellar Quest Racing), which last competed in the series in 2009. The team planned to run 10 to 12 races with the first one being at Richmond. On January 20, 2022, SQR announced that former Kyle Busch Motorsports and GMS Racing Truck Series driver Raphaël Lessard would drive the team's car, the No. 87, part-time. Lessard and the No. 87 car were not on the entry list for the race at Richmond and Lessard revealed in a Facebook post on March 29 that the team would not be attempting any races due to personal issues involving team owner Stout.
- On January 13, 2022, Team Penske Vice Chairman Walt Czarnecki announced that Penske would not field an Xfinity Series team in 2022 unless a sponsor was interested. On February 15, 2022, Roger Penske revealed on SiriusXM NASCAR Radio that his team would field a part-time car in the Xfinity Series in 2022.
- On March 28, 2022, DGM Racing announced it would condense its Xfinity operation to two full-time teams with the No. 36 and No. 91 continuing to run full-time while the No. 92 would become a part-time car. A day later, SS-Green Light Racing announced that it purchased the points of the No. 92 car for its No. 08 car, which had failed to qualify for four of the first six races of the season.
- On April 12, 2022, Richard Childress Racing announced that they would be fielding a third part-time car, the No. 3, in the spring race at Talladega with Jeffrey Earnhardt driving. It is the first time since 2018 that RCR has fielded the No. 3 car in the Xfinity Series.
- On April 19, 2022, B. J. McLeod Motorsports announced that they would scale back to two full-time cars, the No. 5 and No. 78, for the remainder of 2022, with the No. 99, previously a full-time car, now being fielded on a part-time basis.
- On June 2, 2022, Hendrick Motorsports announced it would field the No. 17 in three Xfinity races in 2022, with Kyle Larson running at Road America, Alex Bowman at Indianapolis, and William Byron at Watkins Glen. This marks HMS' return to the Xfinity Series after Tony Stewart won for the team at Daytona in 2009.
- On June 27, 2022, Team Stange Racing revealed that they would field an entry in the Xfinity Series race at the Indianapolis Road Course in order for Tarso Marques, who is running part-time in the Cup Series for the team, to be approved to race in the Cup Series, although they would end up not appearing on the entry list.
- On August 8, 2022, it was revealed that Kaulig Racing would field a fourth car, the No. 14, for the first time in the race at Daytona which will be driven by Justin Haley, who drives full-time in the Cup Series for the team.

==== Drivers ====
- On September 15, 2020, JR Motorsports announced that Sam Mayer would run full-time for them in 2022 after running the second half of the 2021 season in their No. 8 car. After the announcement that Josh Berry, who shared the No. 8 car with Mayer in 2021, would drive the No. 8 full-time in 2022, Dustin Albino from Jayski confirmed that Mayer would still run full-time for JRM in 2022. Dale Earnhardt Jr. himself commented on NASCAR Reddit that it was possible that the team could run five cars full-time so the team would not have to release one of their other full-time drivers. JRM had re-signed Noah Gragson and Justin Allgaier in addition to Berry and Mayer and it was likely that Michael Annett would return to the team in 2022 due to him bringing sponsorship from Pilot Flying J, so at that time, it was likely that Mayer would run full-time for JRM in the fifth car. However, with Annett announcing his retirement, Mayer will replace him as the team's fourth full-time driver and the team will not field a fifth car full-time. However, JRM will field a fifth car (the No. 88) in the spring Martinsville race for Earnhardt Jr. in his once-a-year Xfinity Series start. It is the first time since 2018 that JRM will have fielded five cars in a race. On December 15, JRM revealed a new font for the No. 1 on their website, which indicates that it will be Mayer's car number in 2022.
- On June 18, 2021, Kaulig Racing announced that Justin Haley, the driver of their No. 11 car in the Xfinity Series, would move up to the Cup Series full-time in 2022, driving the team's No. 31 car. On September 25, Kaulig announced that Daniel Hemric would replace Haley in the No. 11 in 2022. He drove the No. 18 for Joe Gibbs Racing in 2021 and won the championship. Hemric also drove Kaulig's No. 10 car in the race at Charlotte in 2019 as a relief driver for Austin Dillon.
- On July 15, 2021, Team Penske announced that Austin Cindric would move up to the Cup Series full-time in 2022, replacing Brad Keselowski (who is moving to RFK Racing to become a driver/co-owner for that team) in the No. 2 car. The team has yet to announce their plans for the No. 22 car, although at this time it appears most likely that it will go back to being an "all-star car" with their Cup Series drivers sharing the ride, according to Jordan Bianchi from The Athletic.
- On July 15, 2021, it was also announced that Harrison Burton, the driver of the No. 20 for Joe Gibbs Racing in the Xfinity Series, would be moving up to the Cup Series full-time in 2022, replacing Matt DiBenedetto in the No. 21 car for Wood Brothers Racing. JGR has yet to announce who will replace Burton in the No. 20, although JGR part-time Xfinity and full-time ARCA driver Ty Gibbs and Kyle Busch Motorsports full-time Truck Series driver John Hunter Nemechek are widely considered to be the most likely candidates (although Nemechek would run part-time since he is returning to KBM in the Truck Series full-time in 2022). Gibbs could also stay in the No. 54, which he drove part-time in 2021, and run full-time in that car since Kyle Busch will not be returning to the Xfinity Series in 2022 after reaching his retirement goal of 100 wins in the series in 2021. Gibbs could also drive JGR's No. 18 car in 2022 as Daniel Hemric will be leaving the team to drive the No. 11 for Kaulig Racing in 2022.
- On July 16, 2021, GMS Racing full-time Truck Series driver Sheldon Creed stated in an interview that he would like to move up to the Xfinity Series full-time in 2022. On August 17, Chris Knight from Catchfence tweeted that Creed was close to getting a 2022 deal done. On September 14, it was announced that Creed would drive full-time for Richard Childress Racing in the Xfinity Series in 2022. On October 9, RCR announced that Creed would replace Myatt Snider in the No. 2 and that Snider would remain with RCR in their driver development program. On November 3, it was announced that Snider would drive full-time for the RCR-aligned Jordan Anderson Racing in their No. 31 car in 2022.
- On July 27, 2021, Tommy Joe Martins announced that he will go back to part-time as a driver and his team's No. 44 will be split between him and multiple other drivers, one of which currently competes in ARCA and has yet to make a start in the top 3 series. Martins is expected to announce who that driver is sometime in August. On August 30, Martins announced that the driver is Rajah Caruth, who will be running three races in the No. 44 car (one race at Martinsville, Dover, and Richmond) with the possibility of two more if sponsorship can be found (Pocono and Kansas). Caruth will also return to Rev Racing and the Drive for Diversity program in 2022 and will run full-time in the ARCA Menards Series.
- On August 16, 2021, JR Motorsports announced that Josh Berry would drive full-time in their No. 8 car in 2022, which he drove part-time in 2021.
- On September 9, 2021, it was announced that Colby Howard would drive full-time in the Truck Series for McAnally–Hilgemann Racing in 2022. He previously drove the No. 15 for JD Motorsports in the Xfinity Series full-time in 2021 and part-time in 2020.
- On September 21, 2021, it was announced that Stefan Parsons would drive full-time for B. J. McLeod Motorsports in 2022. He has driven part-time for the team since 2019, mostly in the No. 99 car. On April 19, 2022, BJMM announced that they would be cutting back to two full-time cars with the No. 99 car and Parsons being reduced to a part-time schedule.
- On October 2, 2021, Jamie Little revealed during the NASCAR on Fox pre-race show for the Truck Series race at Talladega that Austin Hill will not be returning to Hattori Racing Enterprises in 2022. Hill hopes to compete in the Xfinity Series full-time in 2022. He competed full-time in the Truck Series and part-time in the Xfinity Series for Hattori in 2019, 2020 and 2021. On October 29, it was announced that Hill would drive full-time for Richard Childress Racing in 2022.
- On October 6, 2021, it was announced that Michael Annett would retire from full-time competition after the 2021 season. He has driven full-time for JR Motorsports in the Xfinity Series since 2017.
- On October 11, 2021, Jeb Burton confirmed in an interview with Frontstretch that he would not be returning to the Kaulig Racing No. 10 in 2022 as a result of longtime sponsor Nutrien parting ways with the team at the end of the 2021 season. On December 9, Kaulig signed Landon Cassill to drive the No. 10 full-time in 2022.
- On October 15, 2021, Bayley Currey stated in an interview with Jayski's Silly Season Site that he hopes to return to JD Motorsports in 2022. He drove for Mike Harmon Racing for most of the 2021 season until he was taken out of the ride due to other drivers bringing sponsorship. On December 27, JDM announced that Currey would drive one of their cars full-time in 2022. Although he drove the No. 15 in all of his starts for the team in 2021, Currey moved to JDM's No. 4 car for 2022, replacing Landon Cassill.
- On October 19, 2021, B. J. McLeod Motorsports announced that Nick Sanchez would run part-time for the team in 2022. It will be his debut in the Xfinity Series. Sanchez, a member of the Drive for Diversity program, will also continue to drive full-time for Rev Racing in the ARCA Menards Series in 2022. Sanchez would replace Matt Mills in BJMM's No. 5 car in the races he ran. On July 15, 2022, Sanchez parted ways with B. J. McLeod Motorsports after running two of his seven races scheduled with the team. On September 8, Mills tweeted that he would miss the Kansas race due to a flu. Garrett Smithley was announced as the driver of the No. 5 for the race.
- On November 9, 2021, Jeffrey Earnhardt posted on his Facebook page that he would not return to JD Motorsports in 2022 in order to pursue opportunities to drive for a top-tier team whether it be full-time or part-time. On January 14, 2022, it was announced that Earnhardt would drive part-time in the No. 26 car for Sam Hunt Racing. On March 8, Emerling-Gase Motorsports announced that Earnhardt would drive their No. 35 car in the spring race at Phoenix. On April 12, it was announced that Earnhardt would drive for Richard Childress Racing in the spring race at Talladega in their No. 3 car, the number made famous by his grandfather Dale when he drove for RCR in the Cup Series.
- On November 15, 2021, DGM Racing announced that Josh Williams will not return to the No. 92, with the team opting to find an experienced and funded driver to fill the seat in 2022. On January 31, it was announced that Kyle Weatherman, who drove the No. 47 for Mike Harmon Racing full-time in 2021, would replace Williams in the No. 92, driving the first five races of the season in that car. Ross Chastain drove the No. 92 at COTA. After COTA, the No. 92's owner points were sold to the No. 08 SS-Green Light Racing car, primarily driven by David Starr.
- On November 22, 2021, NASCAR indefinitely suspended Alpha Prime Racing driver/co-owner Caesar Bacarella for substance abuse after he claimed he unknowingly took a workout supplement that is on the banned substances list. Bacarella enrolled in the Road to Recovery program with the expectation of being reinstated in time for the season-opener at Daytona. On February 14, 2022, Bacarella was reinstated by NASCAR.
- On December 1, 2021, JR Motorsports announced that Porsche Cup Brasil champion Miguel Paludo will return to the team for three road course races in 2022, although he will now drive the part-time No. 88 car as Josh Berry is driving the No. 8, which Paludo drove in 2021, full-time in 2022. On April 26, 2022, JR Motorsports announced that the No. 88 would be driven by Cup Series regulars Chase Elliott at Darlington spring, William Byron at Texas and New Hampshire, and Kyle Larson at Watkins Glen and Darlington fall.
- On December 3, 2021, RSS Racing announced that Parker Retzlaff, who has driven in the ARCA Menards Series East for Cook-Finley Racing, would run part-time in the team's full-time second car (later announced to be the No. 38) in 2022. With the race at Bristol in September overlapping with C. J. McLaughlin's schedule in the car, Retzlaff may drive the third RSS car, the No. 28, in that race or that race could be switched to another one.
- On December 8, 2021, B. J. McLeod Motorsports announced that Josh Williams would run full-time in the No. 78 for the team in 2022. Williams drove for DGM Racing the last five years either full-time or part-time. On August 10, Williams parted ways with B. J. McLeod Motorsports.
- On December 15, 2021, DGM Racing announced that Mason Massey would drive the No. 91 car for the majority of the 2022 season. He drove part-time for B. J. McLeod Motorsports in 2020 and 2021. A Jayski article on March 20, 2022, revealed that Massey would drive the car in all of the oval races. On May 25, 2022, DGM Racing announced that IMSA driver Mason Filippi would make his Xfinity Series and NASCAR debut in the race at Portland in the team's No. 91 car.
- On December 16, 2021, it was announced that Anthony Alfredo, previously the driver of the No. 38 for Front Row Motorsports in the Cup Series, and Jeb Burton, previously the driver of the Kaulig Racing No. 10, would both run full-time for Our Motorsports in 2022 as the team expands to three full-time cars. Alfredo will drive the No. 23, which multiple drivers drove part-time in 2021, and Burton will drive the team's new third car, the No. 27.
- On January 7, 2022, Mike Harmon Racing announced that it has parted ways with Kyle Weatherman. On January 31, it was announced that Weatherman would drive the No. 92 for DGM Racing in the first five races of the season. On February 10, it was announced that Gray Gaulding, who drove MHR's No. 74 car at the Charlotte Roval in 2020 and 2021 and at Kansas in October 2021, would drive the No. 47 in the season-opener at Daytona and Talladega. Brennan Poole would compete in their No. 47 for a handful of races.
- On January 8, 2022, SS-Green Light Racing announced that Joe Graf Jr. would run full-time in the No. 07 while the second team would have Cole Custer running at least four races and Chase Briscoe running one race in 2022. Custer would end up driving the No. 07 in his first start with the team at California with Graf Jr. moving to the No. 08. On October 4, Truck Series driver Hailie Deegan announced she would make her Xfinity Series debut in the No. 07 at Las Vegas.
- On January 13, 2022, Sam Hunt Racing announced that Ryan Truex would run part-time in the No. 26 in 2022. Truex previously drove full-time in the Truck Series in the No. 40 for Niece Motorsports, but lost his ride in that truck to Dean Thompson for 2022. On February 24, it was announced that Truex would also run 4 races for Joe Gibbs Racing in their No. 18 car. He drove part-time for JGR in the Xfinity Series in 2011 and 2012.
- On January 17, 2022, it was announced that C. J. McLaughlin would return to RSS Racing to drive their No. 38 car in 14 races in 2022. He drove part-time for RSS in 2019 and 2020. McLaughlin would end up driving 1 of his races (Las Vegas in March) in the team's No. 28 car instead of the No. 38.
- On January 20, 2022, SQR Development announced that former Kyle Busch Motorsports and GMS Racing Truck Series driver Raphaël Lessard would drive the team's car, the No. 87, part-time. Lessard and the No. 87 car were not on the entry list for the team's scheduled first race at Richmond and Lessard revealed in a Facebook post on March 29 that the team would not be attempting any races due to personal issues involving team owner Stout.
- On February 12, 2022, DGM Racing announced that Alex Labbé, who drove their No. 36 car full-time in 2021, would only be driving for the team part-time in 2022 due to lack of sponsorship. He drove the team's part-time fourth car, the No. 90, in the season-opener at Daytona. He would then drive for the team in the races at Phoenix in March and COTA (in the No. 36), Road America, the Indy Road Course, Michigan, Daytona in August, Bristol and the Charlotte Roval. However, Labbé would end up also running every race after Daytona until Charlotte in May in the No. 36 car. On May 24, DGM announced that Labbé would not be running the race at Charlotte due to the inability to find a sponsor but would return to the No. 36 car for the race at Portland. Austin Konenski from Sportsnaut revealed that Garrett Smithley would be driving the No. 36 car at Charlotte.
- On February 16, 2022, MBM Motorsports announced that J. J. Yeley would drive their No. 66 car in the season-opener at Daytona. Yeley also told Bob Pockrass from Fox that it was possible that he would run the full season in the car.
- On February 21, 2022, it was revealed that ARCA Menards Series West driver Takuma Koga would attempt to make his Xfinity Series debut in the No. 13 car for MBM sometime in 2022.
- On March 9, 2022, Sam Hunt Racing announced that Parker Chase would make his Xfinity Series debut in the race at Circuit of the Americas driving their No. 26 car. Chase has competed part-time in the ARCA Menards Series for Venturini Motorsports and made his Truck Series debut at the Daytona Road Course in 2021 in the Kyle Busch Motorsports No. 51. Chase returned to the No. 26 car at Portland.
- On March 10, 2022, it was announced that road course ringer Patrick Gallagher would drive the RSS Racing No. 38 car in the race at Circuit of the Americas. Gallagher ended up driving the No. 28 RSS car instead of the No. 38. It was his second Xfinity Series start as he made his series debut in 2019 in the race at Mid-Ohio in the B. J. McLeod Motorsports No. 99 car.
- On April 12, 2022, Big Machine Racing announced that Kaz Grala would replace Jade Buford in the team's No. 48 car for the races at Talladega and Dover in April in order to evaluate the team's performance and see if they can get better finishes. At that point in the season, Buford and the No. 48 car had only scored one top-20 finish (eighth at COTA). Tyler Reddick replaced him at Darlington and Texas and Austin Dillon replaced him at Charlotte. Buford returned to the No. 48 car at Portland. On August 7, BMR announced that IndyCar Series driver Marco Andretti would make his NASCAR debut at the Charlotte Roval.
- On May 25, 2022, Joe Gibbs Racing announced that Connor Mosack, who competes full-time in the Trans-Am Series for TeamSLR and part-time in the ARCA Menards Series for Bret Holmes Racing, would make his Xfinity Series debut in their No. 18 car in the race at Portland.
- On May 30, 2022, it was announced that road course ringer Darren Dilley, who has driven in the ICSCC and Sports Car Club of America, would make his Xfinity Series debut in RSS Racing's No. 38 car in the race at Portland.
- On the Portland entry list, Gray Gaulding and Ryan Vargas are revealed to have switched rides, meaning Gaulding would be in the No. 6 and Vargas would be in the No. 47.
- On July 22, 2022, Brandon Brown announced he would drive the Mike Harmon Racing No. 47 at Indianapolis while Austin Dillon would drive the No. 68 of Brandonbilt Motorsports due to a lack of funding on the latter team. Brown later stated that he would unlikely return to the No. 68 full-time as a result of his struggle to secure a sponsor. Kris Wright was announced to drive the No. 68 in all but three races from August onwards. Brown drove the No. 5 for B. J. McLeod Motorsports at Watkins Glen.
- On August 22, 2022, it was announced that Josh Williams would return to DGM Racing starting at the Daytona, with him driving the rest of the season split between the team's No. 36 and No. 92 cars. He will drive the No. 36 car in each race that Alex Labbé does not have sponsorship for (all remaining races except Daytona, Bristol and the Charlotte Roval, where he'll be sponsored by Can-Am). In those three races, Williams will drive the No. 92 car.
- On August 23, 2022, Big Machine Racing owner Scott Borchetta revealed on SiriusXM NASCAR Radio that Ross Chastain would drive his team's No. 48 car in a "couple" of races in 2022. With Ricky Stenhouse Jr. driving the car at Daytona and Nick Sanchez driving the car at Bristol and that "couple" meant more than one race, Chastain will more than likely drive the car at both Darlington and Kansas. (All races after Bristol are playoff races which Cup Series drivers are not allowed to run.)
- On August 29, 2022, Dawson Cram announced that he would join Emerling-Gase Motorsports in their No. 35 Ford with sponsorship from Be Water and in a partnership with Cram Racing Enterprises.

==== Crew chiefs ====
- On November 5, 2021, it was reported by Jayski that Dave Elenz would not return as crew chief for Noah Gragson and would move to the NASCAR Cup Series to be the crew chief for the Richard Petty Motorsports No. 43 car of Erik Jones, replacing Jerry Baxter. The move was officially announced on November 10. Noah Gragson's new crew chief will be announced at a later date. On January 4, JRM announced that former Roush Fenway Racing Cup Series crew chief Luke Lambert would replace Elenz as the crew chief for the No. 9 of Gragson.
- On November 10, 2021, Sam Hunt Racing announced that Allen Hart, who previously worked for JR Motorsports as the engineer for Justin Allgaier's No. 7 car (as well as Allgaier's interim crew chief in one race in 2021), would become the team's technical director as well as the crew chief for their No. 26 car. Former crew chief Andrew Abbott will remain with Sam Hunt Racing in another role.
- On November 16, 2021, it was announced that defending Xfinity Series championship-winning crew chief Dave Rogers, who was Daniel Hemric's crew chief at Joe Gibbs Racing in 2021, would be moving to 23XI Racing in the Cup Series as their performance director in 2022.
- On November 22, 2021, NASCAR suspended Mike Harmon Racing crew chief Ryan Bell for the first six races in 2022 for violating the vehicle testing rule when the team brought the No. 74 car to Rockingham Speedway (which is currently unsanctioned by NASCAR) for a charity event. In addition, the team will have 75 owner and driver points deducted at the start of the 2022 season. On January 27, 2022, Mike Harmon Racing won its final appeal, rescinding Bell's suspension and the monetary fine while still receiving the points deduction. Bell would move from the MHR No. 74 car to the No. 47 car in 2022, replacing Mike Tyska, who became the crew chief for Stefan Parsons and the No. 99 B. J. McLeod Motorsports car.
- On December 8, 2021, B. J. McLeod Motorsports announced that Danny Johnson would be the crew chief for Josh Williams and their No. 78 car in 2022. Johnson crew chiefed the No. 23 Our Motorsports car for most of the first half of the 2021 season. He was also Williams' crew chief when he ran full-time in the ARCA Menards Series in 2016 for his own team.
- On December 16, 2021, Our Motorsports announced their 2022 crew chief lineup. Pat Tryson, who was the crew chief for Brett Moffitt and the No. 02 car for the second half of 2021, will replace Kenneth Roettger Jr. as crew chief of the No. 23, which will now be driven by Anthony Alfredo. Former GMS Racing Truck Series crew chiefs Jeff Hensley and Chad Walter were announced as the crew chiefs for the No. 02 of Moffitt and the new No. 27 car of Jeb Burton, respectively. However, on February 3, it was announced that Hensley would instead be the new crew chief for Matt Crafton's No. 88 truck for ThorSport Racing in the Truck Series. Former East and West Series crew chief and Joe Gibbs Racing crew member Kris Bowen would be the new crew chief for Moffitt and the Our Motorsports No. 02.
- On January 4, 2022, JR Motorsports announced that crew chiefs Mike Bumgarner and Taylor Moyer would switch cars for 2022, with Bumgarner moving from the No. 1 to the No. 8 and Moyer moving from the No. 8 to the No. 1.
- On January 8, 2022, Kaulig Racing announced that crew chiefs Bruce Schlicker and Jason Trinchere would switch cars for 2022, with Schlicker moving from the No. 10 to the No. 16 and Trinchere moving from the No. 16 to the No. 10. On September 9, it was announced that Trinchere would move to Kaulig's No. 11 car, driven by Daniel Hemric, switching cars with Alex Yontz, who became the crew chief for Kaulig's No. 10 car driven by Landon Cassill.
- On February 7, 2022, Jesse Iwuji Motorsports announced that former Rick Ware Racing Cup Series crew chief Jason Houghtaling would be the crew chief of the team's new No. 34 car. Before the race at Talladega in April, Houghtaling was released from the team due to a "multitude of issues" (and would later be suspended by NASCAR on May 3). He was replaced by Dan Stillman, who started the season as the crew chief of the Alpha Prime Racing No. 44 car.
- On April 17, 2022, it was announced that NASCAR on Fox analyst Larry McReynolds would return to crew chiefing for the first time since 2000 as he would serve as the crew chief for Jeffrey Earnhardt and the Richard Childress Racing No. 3 car in the race at Talladega in April.

==== Interim crew chiefs ====
- On October 26, 2021, NASCAR suspended Our Motorsports No. 23 crew chief Kenneth Roettger Jr. for 4 Xfinity Series races after the car lost a ballast during the race at Kansas that month. Because there were only 2 races left in the 2021 season, he will also be suspended for the first 2 races of the 2022 season (Daytona and California). Roettger Jr. will not return to Our Motorsports as a crew chief in 2022 (he was replaced by Pat Tryson, who moved over from the team's No. 02 car), but he will be suspended for whichever team he works for in 2022.
- On December 3, 2021, NASCAR announced that MBM Motorsports crew chief Johnny Roten has been indefinitely suspended after violating the substance abuse policy in the NASCAR rulebook. MBM has yet to announce if Roten will return to the team as a crew chief in 2022 after his suspension is lifted.
- On April 12, 2022, Jeff Stankiewicz, crew chief of the Richard Childress Racing No. 2 driven by Sheldon Creed, was suspended for four races after the car lost a ballast during the 2022 Call 811 Before You Dig 250 at Martinsville Speedway. Jim Pohlman would serve as the interim crew chief for Creed at Talladega, Dover, Darlington and Texas.
- On May 3, 2022, Taylor Moyer, crew chief of the JR Motorsports No. 1 driven by Sam Mayer, was suspended for four races due to a tire and wheel loss during the 2022 A-GAME 200 at Dover. Andrew Overstreet would serve as the interim crew chief for Mayer at Darlington, Texas, Charlotte and Portland.
- On May 31, 2022, Kase Kallenbach, crew chief of the JD Motorsports No. 6 driven by Ryan Vargas and Gray Gaulding, was suspended indefinitely for violating Section 4.4.e, which deals with NASCAR Member Code of Conduct Penalty Options and Guidelines. He was replaced by Alex Bird at Charlotte.
- On October 18, 2022, Mark Setzer, crew chief of the Jeremy Clements Racing No. 51 driven by Jeremy Clements, was suspended for one race and fined US$25,000 for an L1 Penalty under Section 14.4.B.E, which deals with the modification of a composite body part following the 2022 Alsco Uniforms 302 at Las Vegas. In addition, the No. 51 has been docked 40 driver and owner points. Jeremy's father, Tony Clements, would serve as the interim crew chief at Homestead-Miami.

==== Manufacturers ====
- On October 28, 2021, it was announced that RSS Racing would have a technical alliance with Stewart–Haas Racing in 2022. The team switched to Ford in 2021 and the team received old SHR cars although they did not have a technical alliance with them.
- On January 7, 2022, SS-Green Light Racing announced a technical alliance with Stewart-Haas Racing and therefore would switch from Chevrolet to Ford in 2022. In 2021, the team's No. 17 car, fielded in a collaboration with Rick Ware Racing, was a Ford in five races instead of a Chevrolet.
- On January 16, 2022, Carl Long revealed on SiriusXM NASCAR Radio that in the season-opener at Daytona, his No. 66 MBM Motorsports car driven by Timmy Hill would be a Chevrolet. The car is a former Cup Series Gen-6 car that JTG Daugherty Racing used in 2021 converted into an Xfinity Series car. J. J. Yeley would end up driving the car in that race instead of Hill.

== Rule changes ==
- On November 19, 2021, NASCAR announced the new practice and qualifying formats across all three national series in 2022. The formats are as follows:

- Oval races: After a 20-minute practice period for each of two groups, all cars will run a single qualifying lap (two laps at tracks 1.000 miles or shorter). Top five in each group will advance to the final round, which is one or two qualifying laps.
- Superspeedway races: No practice period. All cars run one lap each, with the top 10 transferring to the final round.
- Road courses: After a 20-minute practice period, the field will be separated into two groups, each running a 15-minute timed session. The top five of each group will advance to the final round, which consists of a 10-minute timed session.
- Daytona race 1, Atlanta race 1, Portland, Nashville, and the Phoenix season ending race will have one 50-minute practice session.

- On January 31, 2022, NASCAR announced that the Xfinity Series field size would be expanded to 38 cars, with 33 cars qualifying based on speed and five provisionals.
- On March 11, 2022, NASCAR announced that the reconfigured Atlanta Motor Speedway will enforce track limits currently implemented on Daytona International Speedway and Talladega Superspeedway.
- The Portland race will use the pit lane restrictions for stand-alone races.

== Schedule ==
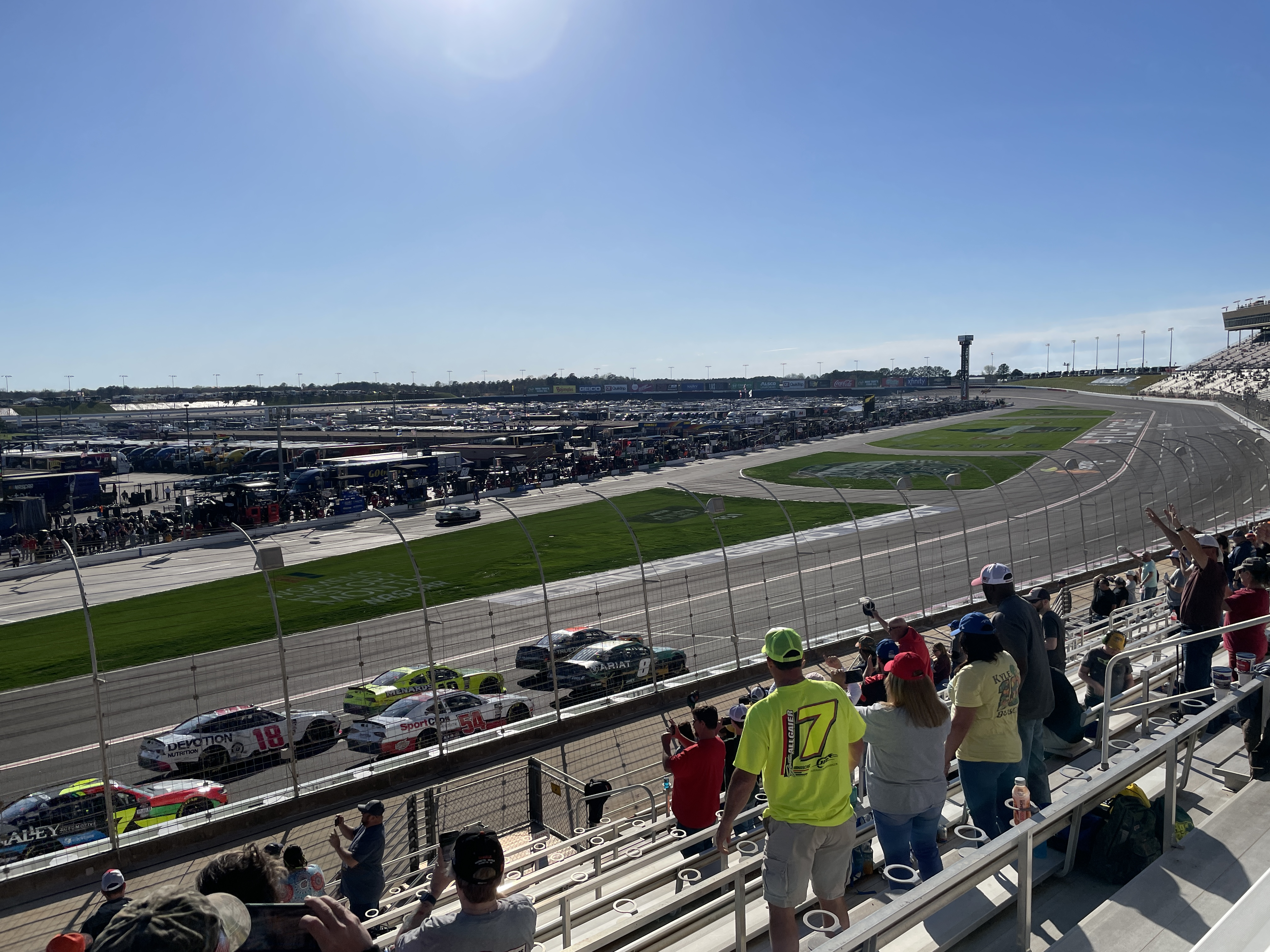
The Nalley Cars 250 at Atlanta Motor Speedway in March.

The 2022 season schedule was announced on September 29, 2021.

Note: The Dash 4 Cash races (the spring races at Richmond, Martinsville, Talladega and Dover) are listed in bold.

No	Race title	Track	Location	Date
1	Beef. It's What's for Dinner. 300	O Daytona International Speedway	Daytona Beach, Florida	February 19
2	Production Alliance Group 300	O Auto Club Speedway	Fontana, California	February 26
3	Alsco Uniforms 300	O Las Vegas Motor Speedway	Las Vegas, Nevada	March 5
4	United Rentals 200	O Phoenix Raceway	Avondale, Arizona	March 12
5	Nalley Cars 250	O Atlanta Motor Speedway	Hampton, Georgia	March 19
6	Pit Boss 250	R Circuit of the Americas	Austin, Texas	March 26
7	**ToyotaCare 250**	O Richmond Raceway	Richmond, Virginia	April 2
8	**Call 811 Before You Dig 250 powered by Call811.com**	O Martinsville Speedway	Ridgeway, Virginia	April 8
9	**Ag-Pro 300**	O Talladega Superspeedway	Lincoln, Alabama	April 23
10	**A-GAME 200**	O Dover Motor Speedway	Dover, Delaware	April 30
11	Mahindra ROXOR 200	O Darlington Raceway	Darlington, South Carolina	May 7
12	SRS Distribution 250	O Texas Motor Speedway	Fort Worth, Texas	May 21
13	Alsco Uniforms 300	O Charlotte Motor Speedway	Concord, North Carolina	May 28
14	Pacific Office Automation 147	R Portland International Raceway	Portland, Oregon	June 4
15	Tennessee Lottery 250	O Nashville Superspeedway	Lebanon, Tennessee	June 25
16	Henry 180	R Road America	Elkhart Lake, Wisconsin	July 2
17	Alsco Uniforms 250	O Atlanta Motor Speedway	Hampton, Georgia	July 9
18	Crayon 200	O New Hampshire Motor Speedway	Loudon, New Hampshire	July 16
19	Explore the Pocono Mountains 225	O Pocono Raceway	Long Pond, Pennsylvania	July 23
20	Pennzoil 150	R Indianapolis Motor Speedway (Road Course)	Speedway, Indiana	July 30
21	New Holland 250	O Michigan International Speedway	Brooklyn, Michigan	August 6
22	Sunoco Go Rewards 200 at The Glen	R Watkins Glen International	Watkins Glen, New York	August 20
23	Wawa 250	O Daytona International Speedway	Daytona Beach, Florida	August 26
24	Sport Clips Haircuts VFW 200	O Darlington Raceway	Darlington, South Carolina	September 3
25	Kansas Lottery 300	O Kansas Speedway	Kansas City, Kansas	September 10
26	Food City 300	O Bristol Motor Speedway	Bristol, Tennessee	September 16
NASCAR Xfinity Series Playoffs
Round of 12
27	Andy's Frozen Custard 300	O Texas Motor Speedway	Fort Worth, Texas	September 24
28	Sparks 300	O Talladega Superspeedway	Lincoln, Alabama	October 1
29	Drive for the Cure 250	R Charlotte Motor Speedway (Roval)	Concord, North Carolina	October 8
Round of 8
30	Alsco Uniforms 302	O Las Vegas Motor Speedway	Las Vegas, Nevada	October 15
31	Contender Boats 300	O Homestead-Miami Speedway	Homestead, Florida	October 22
32	Dead On Tools 250	O Martinsville Speedway	Ridgeway, Virginia	October 29
Championship 4
33	NASCAR Xfinity Series Championship Race	O Phoenix Raceway	Avondale, Arizona	November 5

O Oval track
R Road course

=== Schedule changes ===
- Auto Club Speedway would return to the schedule for the first time in two years as a result of state COVID-19 regulations in California, forcing the cancellation of the 2021 race. It would be scheduled for the weekend after the Daytona 500 (February 25, 26, and 27), making it the second race of the season for the first time since 2010, replacing the Daytona Road Course.
- The major venue change is a swap of Green Savoree Racing Promotions circuits. Mid-Ohio Sports Car Course would lose its date, which would go to Portland International Raceway, which in return Mid-Ohio would be awarded a Camping World Truck Series date. Portland would be the only standalone date for the Xfinity Series in 2022.
- As for other slight realignments, Richmond would go from the late-summer date to the spring date, and Homestead-Miami would go from February to late-October, returning to the playoffs.

== Results and standings ==
=== Race results ===
No.	Race	Pole position	Most laps led	Winning driver	Manufacturer	No.	Winning team	Report
1	Beef. It's What's for Dinner. 300	Daniel Hemric	Daniel Hemric	Austin Hill	Chevrolet	21	Richard Childress Racing	Report
2	Production Alliance Group 300	A. J. Allmendinger	Cole Custer	Cole Custer	Ford	07	SS-Green Light Racing	Report
3	Alsco Uniforms 300	A. J. Allmendinger	Justin Allgaier	Ty Gibbs	Toyota	54	Joe Gibbs Racing	Report
4	United Rentals 200	Trevor Bayne	Noah Gragson	Noah Gragson	Chevrolet	9	JR Motorsports	Report
5	Nalley Cars 250	Noah Gragson	A. J. Allmendinger	Ty Gibbs	Toyota	54	Joe Gibbs Racing	Report
6	Pit Boss 250	Ty Gibbs	A. J. Allmendinger	A. J. Allmendinger	Chevrolet	16	Kaulig Racing	Report
7	ToyotaCare 250	Ty Gibbs	John Hunter Nemechek	Ty Gibbs	Toyota	54	Joe Gibbs Racing	Report
8	Call 811 Before You Dig 250	Ty Gibbs	Ty Gibbs	Brandon Jones	Toyota	19	Joe Gibbs Racing	Report
9	Ag-Pro 300	Jeffrey Earnhardt	Austin Hill	Noah Gragson	Chevrolet	9	JR Motorsports	Report
10	A-GAME 200	Brandon Jones	Justin Allgaier	Josh Berry	Chevrolet	8	JR Motorsports	Report
11	Mahindra ROXOR 200	Ty Gibbs	Justin Allgaier	Justin Allgaier	Chevrolet	7	JR Motorsports	Report
12	SRS Distribution 250	Noah Gragson	Josh Berry	Tyler Reddick	Chevrolet	48	Big Machine Racing	Report
13	Alsco Uniforms 300	Sam Mayer	Josh Berry	Josh Berry	Chevrolet	8	JR Motorsports	Report
14	Pacific Office Automation 147	Anthony Alfredo	Ty Gibbs	A. J. Allmendinger	Chevrolet	16	Kaulig Racing	Report
15	Tennessee Lottery 250	Riley Herbst	Justin Allgaier	Justin Allgaier	Chevrolet	7	JR Motorsports	Report
16	Henry 180	Kyle Larson	Kyle Larson	Ty Gibbs	Toyota	54	Joe Gibbs Racing	Report
17	Alsco Uniforms 250	Ty Gibbs	Austin Hill	Austin Hill	Chevrolet	21	Richard Childress Racing	Report
18	Crayon 200	Josh Berry	Ty Gibbs	Justin Allgaier	Chevrolet	7	JR Motorsports	Report
19	Explore the Pocono Mountains 225	Justin Allgaier	Noah Gragson	Noah Gragson	Chevrolet	9	JR Motorsports	Report
20	Pennzoil 150	A. J. Allmendinger	A. J. Allmendinger	A. J. Allmendinger	Chevrolet	16	Kaulig Racing	Report
21	New Holland 250	Noah Gragson	Ty Gibbs	Ty Gibbs	Toyota	54	Joe Gibbs Racing	Report
22	Sunoco Go Rewards 200 at The Glen	William Byron	William Byron	Kyle Larson	Chevrolet	88	JR Motorsports	Report
23	Wawa 250	A. J. Allmendinger	Noah Gragson	Jeremy Clements	Chevrolet	51	Jeremy Clements Racing	Report
24	Sport Clips Haircuts VFW 200	Brandon Jones	Noah Gragson	Noah Gragson	Chevrolet	9	JR Motorsports	Report
25	Kansas Lottery 300	Brandon Jones	Ty Gibbs	Noah Gragson	Chevrolet	9	JR Motorsports	Report
26	Food City 300	Ty Gibbs	Justin Allgaier	Noah Gragson	Chevrolet	9	JR Motorsports	Report
NASCAR Xfinity Series Playoffs
Round of 12
27	Andy's Frozen Custard 300	Brandon Jones	Noah Gragson	Noah Gragson	Chevrolet	9	JR Motorsports	Report
28	Sparks 300	Austin Hill	Austin Hill	A. J. Allmendinger	Chevrolet	16	Kaulig Racing	Report
29	Drive for the Cure 250	A. J. Allmendinger	A. J. Allmendinger	A. J. Allmendinger	Chevrolet	16	Kaulig Racing	Report
Round of 8
30	Alsco Uniforms 302	A. J. Allmendinger	Noah Gragson	Josh Berry	Chevrolet	8	JR Motorsports	Report
31	Contender Boats 300	Trevor Bayne	Noah Gragson	Noah Gragson	Chevrolet	9	JR Motorsports	Report
32	Dead On Tools 250	Brandon Jones	Ty Gibbs	Ty Gibbs	Toyota	54	Joe Gibbs Racing	Report
Championship 4
33	NASCAR Xfinity Series Championship Race	Ty Gibbs	Ty Gibbs	Ty Gibbs	Toyota	54	Joe Gibbs Racing	Report

=== Drivers' championship ===
(key) Bold – Pole position awarded by time. Italics – Pole position set by competition-based formula. * – Most laps led. ^{1} – Stage 1 winner. ^{2} – Stage 2 winner ^{1–10} – Regular season top 10 finishers.
. – Eliminated after Round of 12 . – Eliminated after Round of 8

Pos	Driver	DAY	CAL	LVS	PHO	ATL	COA	RCH	MAR	TAL	DOV	DAR	TEX	CLT	POR	NSH	ROA	ATL	NHA	POC	IND	MCH	GLN	DAY	DAR	KAN	BRI	TEX	TAL	CLT	LVS	HOM	MAR	PHO	Pts.	Stage	Bonus
1	Ty Gibbs	11	13	1	6	1	**15**	**1**^{2}	**8***^{1}	35	3	16	12	2	7*^{1}	4	1	35	21*	2	8	1*	27	7^{1}	6	3*^{1}	**36**^{1}	3	7	2	4^{1}	2	1*^{2}	**1***^{12}	4040	–	38^{4}
2	Noah Gragson	3	2	2^{12}	1*^{2}	26	4	21	20	1	4	2^{12}	**36**^{1}	4	9	13	8	6	38	1*^{2}	10^{1}	**3**^{12}	4	22*^{2}	1*^{1}	1^{2}	1	1*	10	3	2*^{2}	1*^{12}	4	2	4035	–	56^{3}
3	Justin Allgaier	5	8	5*	10	34	33	14	29	22^{2}	2*^{2}	1*	4	7^{2}	5	1*^{12}	12	7	1	**7**^{1}	3	2	38	13	4^{2}	2	9*^{2}	29	15	5	3	10	5	3	4034	–	33^{2}
4	Josh Berry	16	4	4	3	33^{1}	27	7	19	11^{1}	1	18	7*^{2}	1*^{1}	4	29	3	2^{1}	**31**	3	14^{2}	6	9	18	8	7	7	6	5	8	1	11	20	13	4024	–	22^{5}
NASCAR Xfinity Series Playoffs cut-off
Pos	Driver	DAY	CAL	LVS	PHO	ATL	COA	RCH	MAR	TAL	DOV	DAR	TEX	CLT	POR	NSH	ROA	ATL	NHA	POC	IND	MCH	GLN	DAY	DAR	KAN	BRI	TEX	TAL	CLT	LVS	HOM	MAR	PHO	Pts.	Stage	Bonus
5	A. J. Allmendinger	2	**7**	**9**	7	3*^{2}	1*^{1}	4	3	3	6	8	9	19	1	16	6	10	20	4	**1***	7	2	3	3	6	6	4^{2}	1	**1***^{1}	**22**	3	16	5	2333	35	44^{1}
6	Austin Hill **(R)**	1	27	31	17	2	2	18	4	27*	14	9	5	14	3	8	4	1*^{2}	7	8	9	5	30	14	10	12	3	2	**14***^{12}	29	6	9	9	9	2273	34	18^{6}
7	Sam Mayer	30	6	25	22	21	5^{2}	3	5	28	5^{1}	5	3	**3**	38	5	20	34	15	6	7	33	6	34	11	9	4	8	2	11	7	5	6	34	2239	25	5^{8}
8	Brandon Jones	17	33	10	2	7	18	13	1^{2}	26	**7**	7	14	16	11	14	5	11	28	17	15	4	24	20	**14**	**4**	2	**27**	9	7^{2}	9	15	**23**^{1}	11	2221	30	11^{7}
9	Daniel Hemric	**28***^{12}	12	3	8	35	25	6	13	34	11	10	11	6	6	17	29	5	35	9	22	8	31	19	13	15	20	30^{1}	8	17	8	4	8	8	2220	41	4^{10}
10	Riley Herbst	4	9	14	38	4	26	5	6	7	9	3	8	25	35	**3**	7	9	30	12	6	9	7	15	34	16	5	5	11	32	18	8	3	7	2197	21	2^{9}
11	Ryan Sieg	8	10	36	11	10	11	9	9	4	10	11	35	32	16	9	10	16	32^{1}	15	27	15	13	26	18	14	10	9	4	9	38	33	33	20	2126	10	1
12	Jeremy Clements	37	17	11	18	37	24	20	10	23	29	29	16	22	34	22	9	17	4	32	19	31	10	1	21	21	16	36	20	14	15	26	17	27	2069	–	5
13	Landon Cassill	14	38	6	9	5	31	15	2	5	12	6	10	29	15	18	32	8	37	11	11	10	16	23	12	13	35	33	3	10	11	12	37	4	779	87	–
14	Sheldon Creed **(R)**	6	32	7	14	9	10	22	30	24	8	38	26	8	32	36	27	12	5	5	23	11	8	36	2	11	37	7	12	16	37	17	2	6	751	102	–
15	Anthony Alfredo	7	5	17	37	16	13	12	14	6	15	15	32	33	**31**	20	23	14	29	16	18	14	18	32	37	18	13	19	16	12	10	18	21	35	633	46	–
16	Jeb Burton	19	14	19	12	15	23	11	32	15	16	14	13	12	33	35	21	13	33	33	38	22	37	21	24	38	15	15	17	18	17	19	11	16	560	25	–
17	Brandon Brown	10	11	29	13	18	20	8	34	30	18	35	15	17	12	11	34	33	3	13	34	13	32	4	29	17	38	24	33	20			19	37	538	53	-
18	Myatt Snider	22	26	21	24	30	6	30	24	9	22	37	22	10	2^{2}	27	33	18	34	14	33	17	33	12	28	19	22	20	35	13	19	22	14	25	527	28	1
19	Alex Labbé	DNQ	24	15	19	19	36	19	15	12	19	19	33		10	23	15	23	27	37	12	26	35	8			26	17		6		DNQ	13	18	461	28	–
20	Bayley Currey	20	34	18	20	29	38	31	17	17	36	23	24	15	30	31	16	29	10	26	21	30	26	30	19	35	11	12	24	26	33	13	38	19	428	4	–
21	Brett Moffitt	34	19	8	15	14	7	25	37	10	13	13	29	11	20	10	35	20	14	18	16					10									416	16	–
22	Kyle Weatherman	32	16	26	30	8		28	16		27	12	QL	36		38	QL		8	19	30	16	22		16	QL	17	22			14	20	30	14	369	13	–
23	Trevor Bayne		3^{1}		**4**^{1}	28								9		2			2										13		5	**6**			357	83	2
24	J. J. Yeley	13	22	20	25	11	29	32	31	36	23	25	31	18	8	33	DNQ	36	23	28	DNQ	20		9	32	22	33	34	18	19	36	38	34	30	345	2	–
25	Josh Williams	31	21	DNQ	35	22	DNQ	27	DNQ	19	25	34	20	27	22	34	17	25	24	21	DNQ	36		29	26	24	21	26	19	37	34	30	22	15	314	–	–
26	Ryan Vargas	18	35	32	29	12	30	36	25	20	26	21	38	26	23	19	DNQ	21	19	25		29		6	27	33			30	24	28		29		303	–	–
27	Joe Graf Jr.	29	15	38	27	23	34	29	26	8	28	36	23	34	21	37	36	30	12			23		37	33		23	18	22	27		24	27	36	284	–	–
28	Mason Massey	DNQ	28	27	23	6		17	33	37	34	22	18	DNQ		DNQ		24	9	24		24		33	20	31	32	32	38		29	37	25	33	256	–	–
29	Kyle Sieg **(R)**	21	18	16	32	24		37		18		32		DNQ		25		16		22		21		10	23						26	35		22	232	–	–
30	Sammy Smith																24			31		12	3^{1}	38		8	14						18	10	230	54	1
31	Jeffrey Earnhardt	15	29		34	13				**2**			19	37		7		19									12	38	37		27				200	4	–
32	David Starr	DNQ		DNQ	31	DNQ		23	23	33	35	27	21	DNQ				22	11	27		35		31	25	23	30	37	25		31	21			199	6	–
33	Parker Retzlaff				36			10	12		17					12												21			21	16		21	172	5	–
34	Ryan Truex	12		30					7			30	6					3																	162	28	–
35	Nick Sanchez				26									28													29	11			12	25	7	12	156	10	–
36	Ryan Ellis			13	16				DNQ	32	20		30	13		24					36	27			22		19								155	–	–
37	Sage Karam					32	16										31	38		20	13			5			18			30					152	20	–
38	Joey Gase	26	20	22				34		16								26						16		30		25	21					24	147	–	–
39	C. J. McLaughlin	35		24						DNQ			25	23					13			37		DNQ		34	24	10	29		30	31	24		143	–	–
40	Jade Buford	23	37	28	28	38	8	33	22						14																				127	22	–
41	Patrick Emerling										33	24	28		19	26			16	29		25		QL			27					23	32		125	–	–
42	Preston Pardus						14										11				29		21							21					100	11	–
43	Jesse Iwuji **(R)**	27	36	34		27	DNQ			DNQ			34		26		22	32						11		36			28						94	–	–
44	Derek Griffith							26	21										18							27			23				15		92	–	–
45	Andy Lally														17		14				25		19							31					89	10	–
46	Tommy Joe Martins	24	31			20						17													38			14							87	7	–
47	Shane Lee	33				17			27	14				24																					71	1	–
48	Scott Heckert						32								13						31		23							22					65	1	–
49	Miguel Paludo						9										26				24														52	–	–
50	Patrick Gallagher						22										19				28		36							33					48	1	–
51	Garrett Smithley													21												32		23			25				47	–	–
52	Howie DiSavino III							DNQ	36										17							28			32				28		44	–	–
53	James Davison																													4					43	10	–
54	Caesar Bacarella	38								25								28						28					31						37	–	–
55	Parker Chase						19								27																				31	3	–
56	Drew Dollar	36								13																									30	5	–
57	B. J. McLeod															28											34		26			36		32	29	–	–
58	Dale Earnhardt Jr.								11																										26	–	–
59	Daniil Kvyat																													15					22	–	–
60	Santino Ferrucci																			35	17														22	−	−
61	Dillon Bassett					DNQ		DNQ								30						34				29						DNQ		38	19	–	–
62	Gray Gaulding	DNQ								21					36															DNQ					17	–	–
63	Natalie Decker	DNQ							35	DNQ						32		27																	17	–	–
64	Dawson Cram																								30		DNQ						DNQ	31	13	–	–
65	Ronnie Bassett Jr.	DNQ							DNQ					DNQ						36				DNQ			28						DNQ		10	–	–
66	Julia Landauer																		36													28			10	−	−
67	Chris Dyson																28																		9	–	–
68	Spencer Pumpelly														29								DNQ												8	–	–
69	Bobby McCarty																		DNQ								31								6	–	–
70	Chad Finchum					DNQ			DNQ		32														DNQ		DNQ						36		6	–	–
71	Will Rodgers		DNQ				37										38																		2	–	–
72	Marco Andretti																													36					1	–	–
73	Darren Dilley														37																				1	–	–
	Harrison Rhodes	DNQ				DNQ		DNQ	DNQ																										0	–	–
	Stan Mullis			DNQ	DNQ																														0	–	–
	Gar Robinson						DNQ																												0	–	–
	Dexter Bean																DNQ																		0	–	–
	Stanton Barrett																						DNQ												0	–	–
	Joe Nemechek																							DNQ											0	–	–
Ineligible for Xfinity Series driver points
Pos	Driver	DAY	CAL	LVS	PHO	ATL	COA	RCH	MAR	TAL	DOV	DAR	TEX	CLT	POR	NSH	ROA	ATL	NHA	POC	IND	MCH	GLN	DAY	DAR	KAN	BRI	TEX	TAL	CLT	LVS	HOM	MAR	PHO	Pts.	Stage	Bonus
	Kyle Larson																**2***^{12}						1		5												
	Cole Custer		1*^{2}				3										25			10			11														
	Tyler Reddick											26	1			21	30	4																			
	John Hunter Nemechek			12	5			2*^{1}			37	4					18					19		35	9			28			16						
	Timmy Hill		QL									33	27	38						30			14	2					27	28		29					
	William Byron												2						26^{2}				**25***^{2}														
	Alex Bowman																				2																
	Ross Chastain						17														4		28		15	5											
	Ryan Preece							16						5		6																					
	Kaz Grala		25	23	33					29	24										32	18	5							35				23			
	Chase Briscoe																				5																
	Parker Kligerman						12														37								6								
	Ty Dillon																37		6		20				35												
	Chandler Smith									38	21																					7					
	Christopher Bell																								7												
	Stefan Parsons	DNQ	30	33	21	25	21	35	28		30	20	17	30	24	15				23			12		17	26	8	13		25	23	34	31	28			
	Josh Bilicki	9					35					28					13					28	17							34							
	Blaine Perkins																					32	29	17					36				10				
	Rajah Caruth							24			38									38						25					20		12	17			
	Hailie Deegan																														13						
	Brennan Poole		DNQ	37	DNQ	DNQ	DNQ	38	38		DNQ	DNQ	DNQ	35		DNQ		31		DNQ		DNQ			31	37	DNQ	31		DNQ		14		29			
	Connor Mosack														28								15														
	Matt Mills	25	23	35		31		DNQ	18	31	31	31	37	20		DNQ		37	22			38		24				16			35	32	35	DNQ			
	Matt Jaskol														18																32						
	Brad Perez																				DNQ		20							23							
	Kris Wright																						34		36	20	25			38	24	27	26	26			
	Akinori Ogata																		25			DNQ				DNQ		35									
	Mason Filippi														25						DNQ																
	Justin Haley																							25													
	Austin Dillon													31							26																
	Ricky Stenhouse Jr.																			34				27													
	Bubba Wallace						28														35																
	Mike Harmon																												34								
	Loris Hezemans				DNQ	36																															
	Tim Viens	DNQ																						DNQ													
	Jesse Little				DNQ																																
	Chase Elliott											DNQ																									
	Jordan Anderson																					DNQ															
	Austin Wayne Self																						DNQ							DNQ							
Pos	Driver	DAY	CAL	LVS	PHO	ATL	COA	RCH	MAR	TAL	DOV	DAR	TEX	CLT	POR	NSH	ROA	ATL	NHA	POC	IND	MCH	GLN	DAY	DAR	KAN	BRI	TEX	TAL	CLT	LVS	HOM	MAR	PHO	Pts.	Stage	Bonus

=== Owners' championship (Top 15) ===
(key) Bold – Pole position awarded by time. Italics – Pole position set by competition-based formula. * – Most laps led. ^{1} – Stage 1 winner. ^{2} – Stage 2 winner ^{1–10} – Regular season top 10 finishers.
. – Eliminated after Round of 12 . – Eliminated after Round of 8

Pos.	No.	Car Owner	DAY	CAL	LVS	PHO	ATL	COA	RCH	MAR	TAL	DOV	DAR	TEX	CLT	POR	NSH	ROA	ATL	NHA	POC	IND	MCH	GLN	DAY	DAR	KAN	BRI	TEX	TAL	CLT	LVS	HOM	MAR	PHO	Points	Bonus
1	54	Coy Gibbs	11	13	1	6	1	**15**	**1**^{2}	**8***^{1}	35	3	16	12	2	7*^{1}	4	1	35	21*	2	8	1*	27	7^{1}	6	3*^{1}	**36**^{1}	3	7	2	4^{1}	2	1*^{2}	**1***^{12}	4040	38^{4}
2	9	Rick Hendrick	3	2	2^{12}	1*^{2}	26	4	21	20	1	4	2^{12}	**36**^{1}	4	9	13	8	6	38	1*^{2}	10^{1}	**3**^{12}	4	22*^{2}	1*^{1}	1^{2}	1	1*	10	9	2*^{2}	1*^{12}	4	2	4035	56^{3}
3	7	Kelley Earnhardt Miller	5	8	5*	10	34	33	14	29	22^{2}	2*^{2}	1*	4	7^{2}	5	1*^{12}	12	7	1	**7**^{1}	3	2	38	13	4^{2}	2	9*^{2}	29	15	5	3	10	5	3	4034	33^{2}
4	8	Dale Earnhardt Jr.	16	4	4	3	33^{1}	27	7	19	11^{1}	1	18	7*^{2}	1*^{1}	4	29	3	2^{1}	**31**	3	14^{2}	6	9	18	8	7	7	6	5	8	1	11	20	13	4024	22^{5}
NASCAR Xfinity Series Playoffs cut-off
5	16	Matt Kaulig	2	**7**	**9**	7	3*^{2}	1*^{1}	4	3	3	6	8	9	19	1	16	6	10	20	4	**1***	7	2	3	3	6	6	4^{2}	1	**1***^{1}	**22**	3	16	5	2333	44^{1}
6	21	Richard Childress	1	27	31	17	2	2	18	4	27*	14	9	5	14	3	8	4	1*^{2}	7	8	9	5	30	14	10	12	3	2	**14***^{12}	29	6	9	9	9	2273	18^{6}
7	18	Joe Gibbs	36	3^{1}	30	**4**^{1}	28	28	2*^{1}	7	13	37	30	6	9	28	2	24	3	2	31	35	12	3^{1}	38	7	8	14	28	13	4	5	**6**	18	10	2247	5^{10}
8	1	L. W. Miller	30	6	25	22	21	5^{2}	3	5	28	5^{1}	5	3	**3**	38	5	20	34	15	6	7	33	6	34	11	9	4	8	2	11	7	5	6	34	2239	5^{8}
9	19	Joe Gibbs	17	33	10	2	7	18	13	1^{2}	26	**7**	7	14	16	11	14	5	11	28	17	15	4	24	20	**14**	**4**	2	**27**	9	7^{2}	9	15	**23**^{1}	11	2220	11^{7}
10	11	Matt Kaulig	**28***^{12}	12	3	8	35	25	6	13	34	11	10	11	6	6	17	29	5	35	9	22	8	31	19	13	15	20	30^{1}	8	17	8	4	8	8	2219	3
11	98	Gene Haas/Tony Stewart	4	9	14	38	4	26	5	6	7	9	3	8	25	35	**3**	7	9	30	12	6	9	7	15	34	16	5	5	11	32	18	8	3	7	2197	2^{9}
12	51	Jeremy Clements	37	17	11	18	37	24	20	10	23	29	29	16	22	34	22	9	17	4	32	19	31	10	1	21	21	16	36	20	14	15	26	17	27	2069	5
13	10	Matt Kaulig	14	38	6	9	5	31	15	2	5	12	6	10	29	15	18	32	8	37	11	11	10	16	23	12	13	35	33	3	10	11	12	37	4	779	–
14	2	Richard Childress	6	32	7	14	9	10	22	30	24	8	38	26	8	32	36	27	12	5	5	23	11	8	36	2	11	37	7	12	16	37	17	2	6	751	–
15	39	Rod Sieg	8	10	36	11	10	11	9	9	18	10	11	35	32	16	9	10	16	32^{1}	15	27	15	13	26	18	14	10	9	4	9	38	33	33	20	717	1
Pos.	No.	Car Owner	DAY	CAL	LVS	PHO	ATL	COA	RCH	MAR	TAL	DOV	DAR	TEX	CLT	POR	NSH	ROA	ATL	NHA	POC	IND	MCH	GLN	DAY	DAR	KAN	BRI	TEX	TAL	CLT	LVS	HOM	MAR	PHO	Points	Bonus

=== Manufacturers' championship ===
Pos	Manufacturer	Wins	Points
1	Chevrolet	24	1274
2	Toyota	8	1126
3	Ford	1	982

== See also ==
- 2022 NASCAR Cup Series
- 2022 NASCAR Camping World Truck Series
- 2022 ARCA Menards Series
- 2022 ARCA Menards Series East
- 2022 ARCA Menards Series West
- 2022 NASCAR Whelen Modified Tour
- 2022 NASCAR Pinty's Series
- 2022 NASCAR Mexico Series
- 2022 NASCAR Whelen Euro Series
