= Darren Dilley =

American racing driver

- Born: March 7, 1967 (age 59); Hillsboro, Oregon, U.S.

NASCAR O'Reilly Auto Parts Series career
- 1 race run over 1 year
- 2022 position: 73rd
- Best finish: 73rd (2022)
- First race: 2022 Pacific Office Automation 147 (Portland)
Wins	Top tens	Poles
0	0	0
- Statistics up to date as of May 31, 2022.

Darren Dilley (born March 7, 1967) is an American professional sports car racing driver and an elementary school physical education teacher. He last competed part-time in the NASCAR Xfinity Series, driving the No. 38 Ford Mustang for RSS Racing.

== Early racing career ==
In 1990, Dilley and his dad, Bert, would start up Cheap Fast Racing, a Sports Car Club of America team.

== NASCAR ==
On May 30, 2022, RSS Racing would announce that they had tapped Dilley to race the team's No. 38 car at Portland International Raceway for the 2022 Pacific Office Automation 147.

== Personal life ==
Dilley currently works as an elementary PE teacher.

Dilley graduated from Clackamas High School in 1985.

In 2006, Dilley's house was destroyed in a fatal plane crash when pilot Robert E. Guilford crashed during an air show and crashed into a Hillsboro, Oregon, neighborhood.

== Motorsports career results ==
=== NASCAR ===
(key) (Bold – Pole position awarded by qualifying time. Italics – Pole position earned by points standings or practice time. * – Most laps led.)

==== Xfinity Series ====
NASCAR Xfinity Series results
Year	Team	No.	Make	1	2	3	4	5	6	7	8	9	10	11	12	13	14	15	16	17	18	19	20	21	22	23	24	25	26	27	28	29	30	31	32	33	NXSC	Pts	Ref
2022	RSS Racing	38	Ford	DAY	CAL	LVS	PHO	ATL	COA	RCH	MAR	TAL	DOV	DAR	TEX	CLT	PIR; 37	NSH	ROA	ATL	NHA	POC	IND	MCH	GLN	DAY	DAR	KAN	BRI	TEX	TAL	CLT	LVS	HOM	MAR	PHO	73rd	1	
