= 2022 Pacific Office Automation 147 =

Fourteenth race of the 2022 NASCAR Xfinity Series

Race details
- Race 14 of 33 of the 2022 NASCAR Xfinity Series
- Portland International Raceway, the circuit where the race was held.
- Date: June 4, 2022
- Official name: First Annual Pacific Office Automation 147
- Location: Portland International Raceway, Portland, Oregon
- Course: Permanent racing facility
- Course length: 1.967 miles (3.166 km)
- Distance: 75 laps, 147 mi (237 km)
- Scheduled distance: 75 laps, 147 mi (237 km)
- Average speed: 48.883 mph (78.670 km/h)

Pole position
Driver	Anthony Alfredo	Our Motorsports
- Time: 1:16.071

Most laps led
Driver	Ty Gibbs	Joe Gibbs Racing
- Laps: 42

Winner
No. 16	A. J. Allmendinger	Kaulig Racing

Television in the United States
- Network: Fox Sports 1
- Announcers: Adam Alexander, Jamie McMurray, Trevor Bayne

Radio in the United States
- Radio: Motor Racing Network

The 2022 Pacific Office Automation 147 was the fourteenth stock car race of the 2022 NASCAR Xfinity Series and the first iteration of the event. The race was held on Saturday, June 4, 2022, in Portland, Oregon, at Portland International Raceway, a 1.967 miles (3.166 km) permanent road course. The race was contested over 75 laps. In a caution filled race, A. J. Allmendinger, driving for Kaulig Racing, took the lead on the final restart, and would earn his 12th career Xfinity Series win, and his second of the season. To fill out the podium, Myatt Snider of Jordan Anderson Racing and Austin Hill of Richard Childress Racing would finish 2nd and 3rd, respectively.

Three drivers made their debut in this race: Connor Mosack, Darren Dilley, and Mason Filippi.

== Background ==
The 2022 Pacific Office Automation 147 program cover.

Portland International Raceway (PIR) is a motorsport facility in Portland in the U.S. state of Oregon. It is part of the Delta Park complex on the former site of Vanport, just south of the Columbia River. It lies west of a light rail station and less than a mile west of Interstate 5.

The track hosts the IndyCar Series, ICSCC and SCCA and OMRRA road racing, the NASCAR K&N Pro Series West, and SCCA autocross events. Additionally, the PIR grounds are host to OBRA (Oregon Bicycle Racing Association) bicycling races on the track and the surrounding grounds. The facility includes a dragstrip and a motocross track.

=== Entry list ===
- (R) denotes rookie driver.
- (i) denotes driver who is ineligible for series driver points.

#	Driver	Team	Make
1	Sam Mayer	JR Motorsports	Chevrolet
02	Brett Moffitt	Our Motorsports	Chevrolet
2	Sheldon Creed (R)	Richard Childress Racing	Chevrolet
4	Bayley Currey	JD Motorsports	Chevrolet
5	Scott Heckert	B. J. McLeod Motorsports	Chevrolet
6	Gray Gaulding	JD Motorsports	Chevrolet
07	Joe Graf Jr.	SS-Green Light Racing	Ford
7	Justin Allgaier	JR Motorsports	Chevrolet
08	Spencer Pumpelly	SS-Green Light Racing	Ford
8	Josh Berry	JR Motorsports	Chevrolet
9	Noah Gragson	JR Motorsports	Chevrolet
10	Landon Cassill	Kaulig Racing	Chevrolet
11	Daniel Hemric	Kaulig Racing	Chevrolet
13	Matt Jaskol (i)	MBM Motorsports	Toyota
16	A. J. Allmendinger	Kaulig Racing	Chevrolet
18	Connor Mosack	Joe Gibbs Racing	Toyota
19	Brandon Jones	Joe Gibbs Racing	Toyota
21	Austin Hill (R)	Richard Childress Racing	Chevrolet
23	Anthony Alfredo	Our Motorsports	Chevrolet
26	Parker Chase	Sam Hunt Racing	Toyota
27	Jeb Burton	Our Motorsports	Chevrolet
31	Myatt Snider	Jordan Anderson Racing	Chevrolet
34	Jesse Iwuji	Jesse Iwuji Motorsports	Chevrolet
35	Patrick Emerling	Emerling-Gase Motorsports	Toyota
36	Alex Labbé	DGM Racing	Chevrolet
38	Darren Dilley	RSS Racing	Ford
39	Ryan Sieg	RSS Racing	Ford
44	Andy Lally	Alpha Prime Racing	Chevrolet
45	Stefan Parsons	Alpha Prime Racing	Chevrolet
47	Ryan Vargas	Mike Harmon Racing	Chevrolet
48	Jade Buford	Big Machine Racing	Chevrolet
51	Jeremy Clements	Jeremy Clements Racing	Chevrolet
54	Ty Gibbs	Joe Gibbs Racing	Toyota
66	J. J. Yeley	MBM Motorsports	Toyota
68	Brandon Brown	Brandonbilt Motorsports	Chevrolet
78	Josh Williams	B. J. McLeod Motorsports	Chevrolet
91	Mason Filippi	DGM Racing	Chevrolet
98	Riley Herbst	Stewart-Haas Racing	Ford
Official entry list

== Practice ==
The only 50-minute practice session was held on Friday, June 3, at 10:05 AM PST. Sheldon Creed of Richard Childress Racing was the fastest in the session, with a time of 1:28.678 seconds and a speed of 79.975 mph (128.707 km/h).

Pos.	#	Driver	Team	Make	Time	Speed
1	2	Sheldon Creed (R)	Richard Childress Racing	Chevrolet	1:28.678	79.975
2	54	Ty Gibbs	Joe Gibbs Racing	Toyota	1:29.126	79.573
3	31	Myatt Snider	Jordan Anderson Racing	Chevrolet	1:30.079	78.731
Full practice results

== Qualifying ==
Qualifying was held on Friday, June 3, at 5:05 PM PST. Since Portland International Raceway is a road course, the qualifying system is a two group system, with two rounds. Drivers will be separated into two groups, Group A and Group B. Each driver will have a lap to set a time. The fastest 5 drivers from each group will advance to the final round. Drivers will also have one lap to set a time. The fastest driver to set a time in the round will win the pole.

Round 2 was cancelled due to inclement weather. Anthony Alfredo of Our Motorsports scored the pole for the race, after having the fastest time in Round 1, which was 1:16.071 seconds, and a speed of 93.229 mph (150.038 km/h).

Pos.	#	Driver	Team	Make	Time (R1)	Speed (R1)	Time (R2)	Speed (R2)
1	23	Anthony Alfredo	Our Motorsports	Chevrolet	1:16.071	93.229	-	-
2	21	Austin Hill (R)	Richard Childress Racing	Chevrolet	1:16.280	92.973	-	-
3	11	Daniel Hemric	Kaulig Racing	Chevrolet	1:16.396	92.832	-	-
4	1	Sam Mayer	JR Motorsports	Chevrolet	1:16.416	92.808	-	-
5	48	Jade Buford	Big Machine Racing	Chevrolet	1:16.500	92.706	-	-
6	54	Ty Gibbs	Joe Gibbs Racing	Toyota	1:16.896	92.228	-	-
7	2	Sheldon Creed (R)	Richard Childress Racing	Chevrolet	1:17.082	92.006	-	-
8	18	Connor Mosack	Joe Gibbs Racing	Toyota	1:17.159	91.914	-	-
9	7	Justin Allgaier	JR Motorsports	Chevrolet	1:17.245	91.812	-	-
10	16	A. J. Allmendinger	Kaulig Racing	Chevrolet	1:17.270	91.782	-	-
Eliminated from Round 1
11	9	Noah Gragson	JR Motorsports	Chevrolet	1:16.696	92.469	-	-
12	02	Brett Moffitt	Our Motorsports	Chevrolet	1:16.754	92.399	-	-
13	10	Landon Cassill	Kaulig Racing	Chevrolet	1:16.830	92.308	-	-
14	98	Riley Herbst	Stewart-Haas Racing	Ford	1:16.872	92.257	-	-
15	44	Andy Lally	Alpha Prime Racing	Chevrolet	1:17.193	91.874	-	-
16	51	Jeremy Clements	Jeremy Clements Racing	Chevrolet	1:17.211	91.852	-	-
17	13	Matt Jaskol (i)	MBM Motorsports	Toyota	1:17.313	91.731	-	-
18	26	Parker Chase	Sam Hunt Racing	Toyota	1:17.346	91.692	-	-
19	8	Josh Berry	JR Motorsports	Chevrolet	1:17.407	91.620	-	-
20	5	Scott Heckert	B. J. McLeod Motorsports	Chevrolet	1:17.643	91.341	-	-
21	27	Jeb Burton	Our Motorsports	Chevrolet	1:17.986	90.939	-	-
22	19	Brandon Jones	Joe Gibbs Racing	Toyota	1:18.129	90.773	-	-
23	36	Alex Labbé	DGM Racing	Chevrolet	1:18.164	90.732	-	-
24	08	Spencer Pumpelly	SS-Green Light Racing	Ford	1:18.194	90.698	-	-
25	31	Myatt Snider	Jordan Anderson Racing	Chevrolet	1:18.450	90.402	-	-
26	45	Stefan Parsons	Alpha Prime Racing	Chevrolet	1:18.958	89.820	-	-
27	39	Ryan Sieg	RSS Racing	Ford	1:18.962	89.815	-	-
28	68	Brandon Brown	Brandonbilt Motorsports	Chevrolet	1:19.089	89.671	-	-
29	91	Mason Filippi	DGM Racing	Chevrolet	1:19.450	89.264	-	-
30	6	Gray Gaulding	JD Motorsports	Chevrolet	1:19.460	89.252	-	-
31	78	Josh Williams	B. J. McLeod Motorsports	Chevrolet	1:19.781	88.893	-	-
32	38	Darren Dilley	RSS Racing	Ford	1:20.065	88.578	-	-
Qualified by owner's points
33	07	Joe Graf Jr.	SS-Green Light Racing	Ford	1:20.631	87.956	-	-
34	4	Bayley Currey	JD Motorsports	Chevrolet	1:20.644	87.942	-	-
35	66	J. J. Yeley	MBM Motorsports	Toyota	1:21.232	87.305	-	-
36	35	Patrick Emerling	Emerling-Gase Motorsports	Toyota	1:21.809	86.690	-	-
37	47	Ryan Vargas	Mike Harmon Racing	Chevrolet	1:21.970	86.520	-	-
38	34	Jesse Iwuji	Jesse Iwuji Motorsports	Chevrolet	1:30.729	78.167	-	-
Official qualifying results
Official starting lineup

== Race results ==
Stage 1 Laps: 25

Pos.	#	Driver	Team	Make	Pts
1	54	Ty Gibbs	Joe Gibbs Racing	Toyota	10
2	21	Austin Hill (R)	Richard Childress Racing	Chevrolet	9
3	18	Connor Mosack	Joe Gibbs Racing	Toyota	8
4	11	Daniel Hemric	Kaulig Racing	Chevrolet	7
5	02	Brett Moffitt	Our Motorsports	Chevrolet	6
6	36	Alex Labbé	DGM Racing	Chevrolet	5
7	9	Noah Gragson	JR Motorsports	Chevrolet	4
8	10	Landon Cassill	Kaulig Racing	Chevrolet	3
9	19	Brandon Jones	Joe Gibbs Racing	Toyota	2
10	7	Justin Allgaier	JR Motorsports	Chevrolet	1

Stage 2 Laps: 25

Pos.	#	Driver	Team	Make	Pts
1	31	Myatt Snider	Jordan Anderson Racing	Chevrolet	10
2	44	Andy Lally	Alpha Prime Racing	Chevrolet	9
3	21	Austin Hill (R)	Richard Childress Racing	Chevrolet	8
4	10	Landon Cassill	Kaulig Racing	Chevrolet	7
5	8	Josh Berry	JR Motorsports	Chevrolet	6
6	23	Anthony Alfredo	Our Motorsports	Chevrolet	5
7	7	Justin Allgaier	JR Motorsports	Chevrolet	4
8	16	A. J. Allmendinger	Kaulig Racing	Chevrolet	3
9	2	Sheldon Creed (R)	Richard Childress Racing	Chevrolet	2
10	48	Jade Buford	Big Machine Racing	Chevrolet	1

Stage 3 Laps: 25

Fin.	St	#	Driver	Team	Make	Laps	Led	Status	Pts
1	10	16	A. J. Allmendinger	Kaulig Racing	Chevrolet	75	6	Running	43
2	25	31	Myatt Snider	Jordan Anderson Racing	Chevrolet	75	19	Running	45
3	2	21	Austin Hill (R)	Richard Childress Racing	Chevrolet	75	0	Running	51
4	19	8	Josh Berry	JR Motorsports	Chevrolet	75	0	Running	39
5	9	7	Justin Allgaier	JR Motorsports	Chevrolet	75	0	Running	37
6	3	11	Daniel Hemric	Kaulig Racing	Chevrolet	75	0	Running	38
7	6	54	Ty Gibbs	Joe Gibbs Racing	Toyota	75	42	Running	40
8	35	66	J. J. Yeley	MBM Motorsports	Toyota	75	0	Running	29
9	11	9	Noah Gragson	JR Motorsports	Chevrolet	75	0	Running	32
10	23	36	Alex Labbé	DGM Racing	Chevrolet	75	0	Running	32
11	22	19	Brandon Jones	Joe Gibbs Racing	Toyota	75	0	Running	28
12	28	68	Brandon Brown	Brandonbilt Motorsports	Chevrolet	75	0	Running	25
13	20	5	Scott Heckert	B. J. McLeod Motorsports	Chevrolet	75	0	Running	24
14	5	48	Jade Buford	Big Machine Racing	Chevrolet	75	3	Running	24
15	13	10	Landon Cassill	Kaulig Racing	Chevrolet	75	0	Running	32
16	27	39	Ryan Sieg	RSS Racing	Ford	75	0	Running	21
17	15	44	Andy Lally	Alpha Prime Racing	Chevrolet	75	3	Running	29
18	17	13	Matt Jaskol (i)	MBM Motorsports	Toyota	75	0	Running	0
19	36	35	Patrick Emerling	Emerling-Gase Motorsports	Toyota	75	0	Running	18
20	12	02	Brett Moffitt	Our Motorsports	Chevrolet	75	0	Running	23
21	33	07	Joe Graf Jr.	SS-Green Light Racing	Ford	75	0	Running	16
22	31	78	Josh Williams	B. J. McLeod Motorsports	Chevrolet	74	0	Running	15
23	37	47	Ryan Vargas	Mike Harmon Racing	Chevrolet	73	0	Running	14
24	26	45	Stefan Parsons	Alpha Prime Racing	Chevrolet	73	0	Running	13
25	29	91	Mason Filippi	DGM Racing	Chevrolet	72	0	Running	12
26	38	34	Jesse Iwuji	Jesse Iwuji Motorsports	Chevrolet	71	0	Running	11
27	18	26	Parker Chase	Sam Hunt Racing	Toyota	62	0	Accident	10
28	8	18	Connor Mosack	Joe Gibbs Racing	Toyota	62	0	Accident	17
29	24	08	Spencer Pumpelly	SS-Green Light Racing	Ford	62	0	Accident	8
30	34	4	Bayley Currey	JD Motorsports	Chevrolet	62	0	Accident	7
31	1	23	Anthony Alfredo	Our Motorsports	Chevrolet	62	0	Accident	11
32	7	2	Sheldon Creed (R)	Richard Childress Racing	Chevrolet	55	1	Accident	7
33	21	27	Jeb Burton	Our Motorsports	Chevrolet	55	0	Accident	4
34	16	51	Jeremy Clements	Jeremy Clements Racing	Chevrolet	44	0	Accident	3
35	14	98	Riley Herbst	Stewart-Haas Racing	Ford	35	0	Accident	2
36	30	6	Gray Gaulding	JD Motorsports	Chevrolet	27	0	Accident	1
37	32	38	Darren Dilley	RSS Racing	Ford	25	0	Accident	1
38	4	1	Sam Mayer	JR Motorsports	Chevrolet	12	0	Accident	1
Official race results

== Standings after the race ==
Drivers' Championship standings

Pos	Driver	Points
1	A. J. Allmendinger	573
2	Ty Gibbs	530 (-43)
3	Noah Gragson	529 (-44)
4	Josh Berry	509 (-64)
5	Justin Allgaier	509 (-64)
6	Brandon Jones	428 (-145)
7	Sam Mayer	424 (-149)
8	Austin Hill	416 (-157)
9	Daniel Hemric	389 (-184)
10	Landon Cassill	366 (-207)
11	Riley Herbst	364 (-209)
12	Ryan Sieg	345 (-228)
Official driver's standings

- Note: Only the first 12 positions are included for the driver standings.

Previous race: 2022 Alsco Uniforms 300 (Charlotte)	NASCAR Xfinity Series; 2022 season	Next race: 2022 Tennessee Lottery 250
