= Jayski's Silly Season Site =

Website focused on NASCAR news

- Logo as of 2019
- Website type: NASCAR
- Available in: English
- Owners: NASCAR Digital Media; Jay Adamczyk
- Creator: Jay Adamczyk
- Website: www.jayski.com
- Commercial: yes
- Registration: None
- Launched: August 26, 1996
- Current status: Active
- over 500,000 daily page views

Jayski's Silly Season Site is a web site focusing primarily on NASCAR news and rumors. The website was founded by Jay "Jayski" Adamczyk in 1996 (who was a fan of Mark Donohue) after he had difficulty finding news regarding the Melling Racing team, and subsequently worked to get all NASCAR news grouped together on the site. The site was purchased from Adamczyk by ESPN in 2007; after ESPN shut the site down in January 2019, Adamczyk reacquired the rights to Jayski-related properties in April 2019 and rolled out a limited version of the new website with a full launch occurring on May 13, 2019.

As of 2026, website owner Jay Adamczyk is semi-retired and continues to own the website and remains in control of decisions about it. His editorial work in his semi-retirement primarily consists of updating statistic pages. The website's other writers are Scott Page, Amanda Brooks and Dustin Albino.

== Website ==
The name for Jayski's Silly Season Site is a reference to the midpoint of the NASCAR season when rumors within the sport most often circulate. The main feature of the site is a "News and Rumors" page for the major three NASCAR series. The sites also hosts pictures of the paint schemes used by teams throughout that year, television schedules and tributes to deceased drivers. The site also lists series statistics and external links to teams and drivers.

== History ==
=== 1996–2007: Independent years ===
Adamczyk created the site in 1996 and used his moniker from his time in the military, Jayski, to brand the site. On December 3, 1999, Adamczyk quit his job as a computer programmer for the Federal Aviation Administration to work on the site full-time. Two years later, Jayski's content began to be featured on Knight Ridder's racing website, That's Racin'. That freed Adamczyk from several business commitments (such as advertising), and enabled him to focus solely on creating content, and hosting external links to newspaper and magazine stories on the NASCAR world. In January 2004, sports network ESPN began to host Jayski.

=== 2007–2019: ESPN ownership ===
In early April 2007, as part of its renewed interest in NASCAR following re-acquisition of broadcasting rights, ESPN purchased Jayski.com. Jayski underwent a stylistic overhaul in August 2009. The site was redesigned in early 2017, becoming part of ESPN.com, but Adamczyk continues to operate the site on a daily basis with a staff of two.

Jayski's Silly Season Site was featured in Time's The 50 Best Websites of 2011. Jayski ran a podcast until 2013. Adamzcyk had later expanded the Jayski staff to include two other employees to compile information about NASCAR.

On January 28, 2019, ESPN ceased operations of Jayski. The move was part of a wider exodus from NASCAR for ESPN, which also let go of reporters Ricky Craven and Bob Pockrass over the 2019 offseason. Many within the NASCAR community expressed gratitude for the two-plus decades that Jayski ran online.

=== 2019–present: NASCAR Digital Media partnership ===
The domain of jayski.com was acquired back from ESPN in April 2019, and a partial site was rolled out while the search for a new web host partner began. A full site, now hosted by NASCAR Digital Media, was revealed on May 12, 2019.

On the website's 30th anniversary on August 26, 2026, the Jayski staff announced that they were considering developing a mobile app for the website in the future.
