= Bob Pockrass =

American motorsports journalist

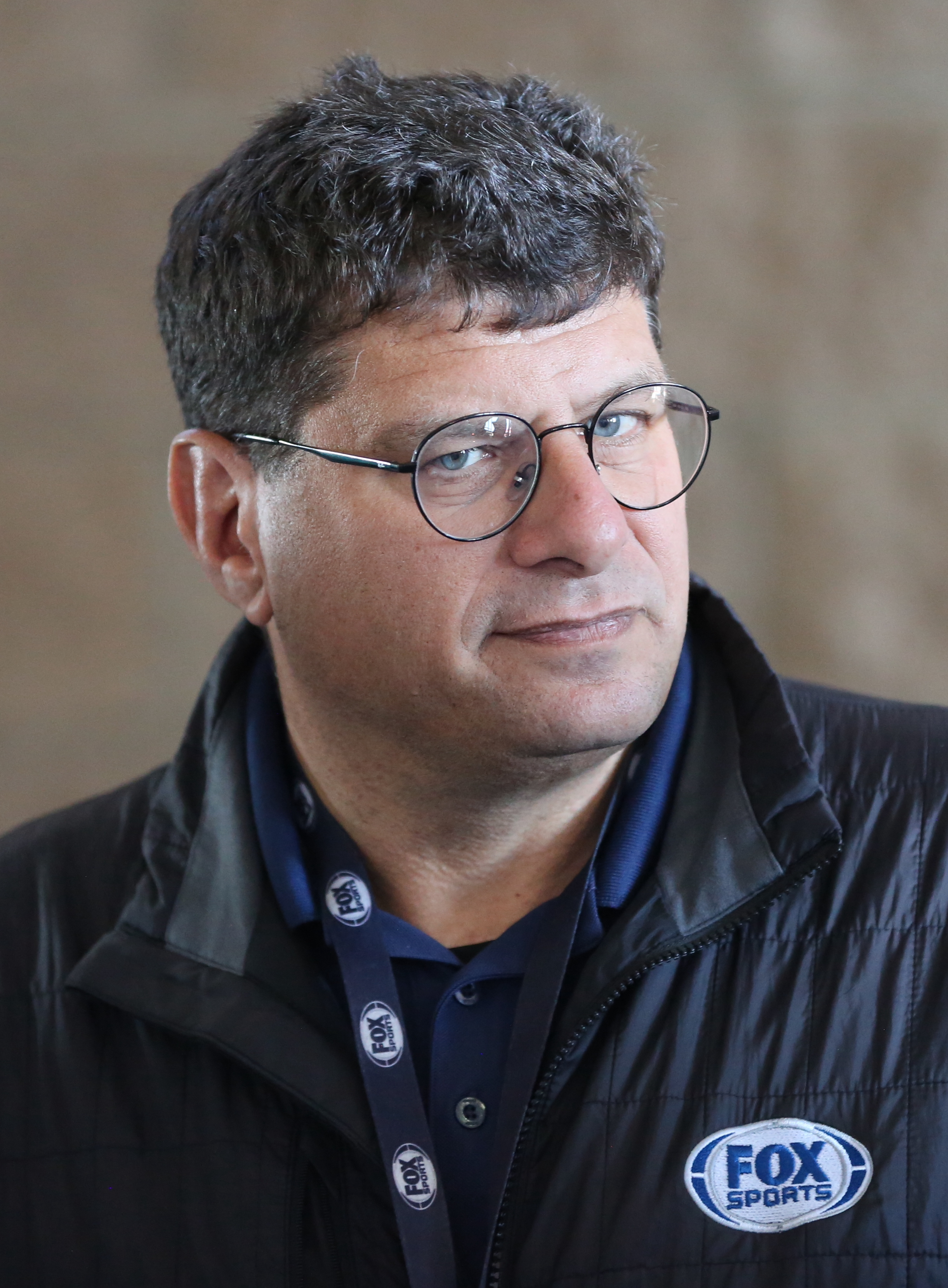
- Pockrass at Sonoma Raceway in 2026
- Born: Robert Pockrass; March 1, 1969 (age 57)
- Education: Indiana University Bloomington
- Occupation: TV sports reporter
- Years active: 1991–present
- Employer: Fox Sports
- Spouse: Lori Perkovich (m. 2019)

Robert Pockrass (born March 1, 1969) is an American motorsports journalist and on-air talent for Fox Sports who covers NASCAR and IndyCar.

== Early life ==
Pockrass moved to Indianapolis at 10 years old and attended Indiana University Bloomington, initially being a business major before graduating with a degree in journalism. His older brother was a writer for the Indianapolis News. Pockrass is Jewish and grew up as a fan of the New York Mets.

== Career ==
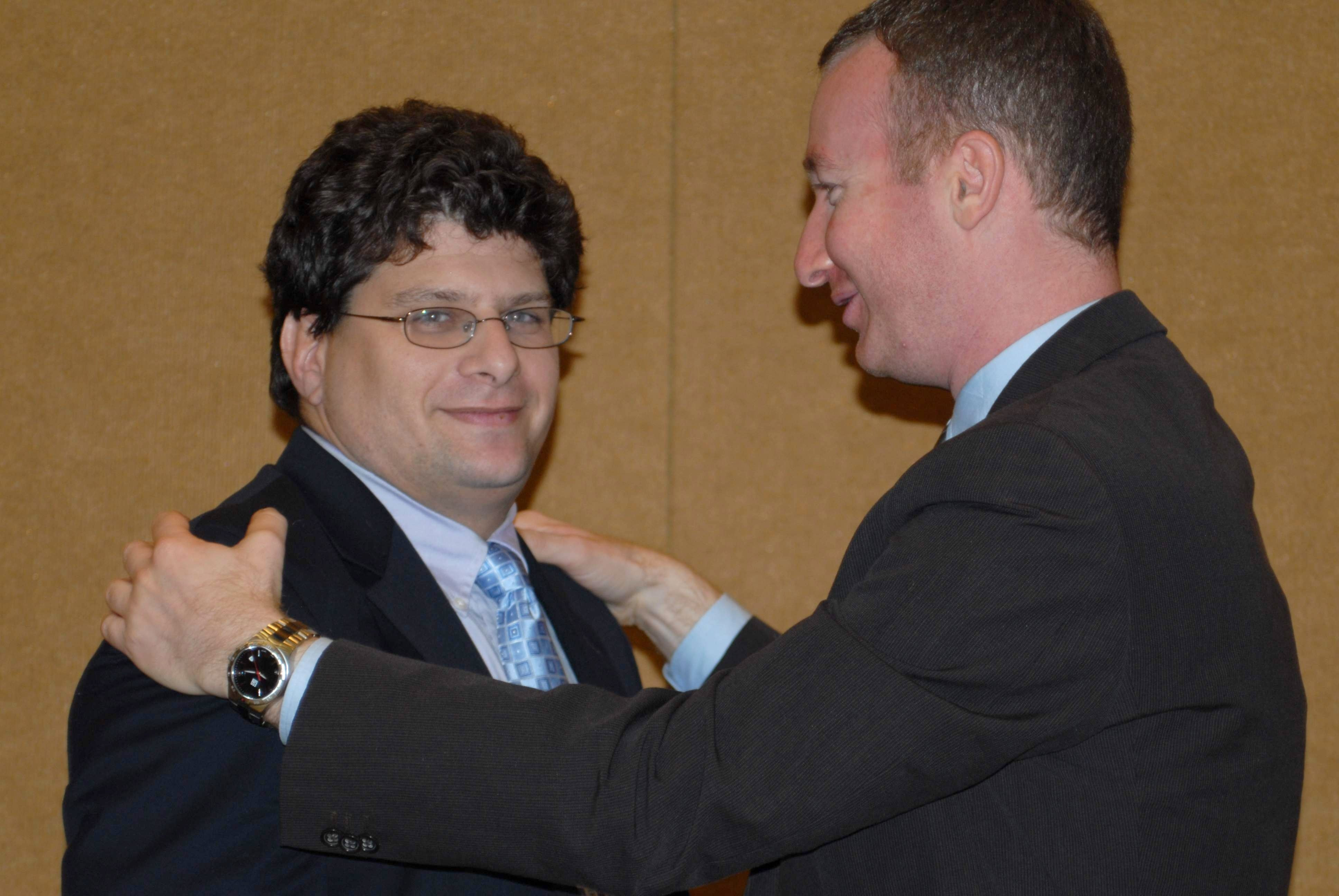
Pockrass receiving an award from the National Motorsports Press Association (NMPA) in 2010

Pockrass began covering NASCAR in 1991. He started as a sports writer for the Daytona Beach News-Journal from 1991 to 2003. He later covered the sport for SceneDaily.com from 2003 to 2012, Sporting News from 2012 to 2014 and ESPN from 2015 to 2018.

Pockrass joined Fox NASCAR before the 2019 season after being laid off at ESPN following the 2018 NASCAR season due to the network's financial problems and budget cuts.

In 2023, Pockrass made his broadcasting debut, serving as a pit reporter for the ARCA Menards Series race at Watkins Glen International.
