= 2022 ToyotaCare 250 =

Seventh race of the 2022 NASCAR Xfinity Series

Race details
- Race 7 of 33 in the 2022 NASCAR Xfinity Series
- Date: April 2, 2022
- Official name: 35th Annual ToyotaCare 250
- Location: Henrico County, Virginia, Richmond Raceway
- Course: Permanent racing facility
- Course length: 0.75 miles (1.21 km)
- Distance: 250 laps, 187.5 mi (301.8 km)
- Scheduled distance: 250 laps, 187.5 mi (301.8 km)
- Average speed: 95.299 mph (153.369 km/h)

Pole position
Driver	Ty Gibbs	Joe Gibbs Racing
- Time: 22.161

Most laps led
Driver	John Hunter Nemechek	Joe Gibbs Racing
- Laps: 135

Winner
No. 54	Ty Gibbs	Joe Gibbs Racing

Television in the United States
- Network: Fox Sports 1
- Announcers: Adam Alexander, Daniel Suárez, Joey Logano

Radio in the United States
- Radio: Motor Racing Network

The 2022 ToyotaCare 250 was the seventh stock car race of the 2022 NASCAR Xfinity Series, the 35th iteration of the event, and the first race of the Dash 4 Cash. The race was held on Saturday, April 2, 2022, in Henrico County, Virginia at Richmond Raceway, a 0.75 mile (1.21 km) permanent D-shaped oval. The Dash 4 Cash in this race consisted of A. J. Allmendinger, Austin Hill, Noah Gragson, and Sam Mayer, after they finished in the top 5 at Circuit of the Americas. The race was run over 250 laps. Ty Gibbs of Joe Gibbs Racing would win the race after passing his teammate, John Hunter Nemechek, on the last lap. This was Gibbs' seventh career Xfinity Series win, and his third of the season. To fill out the podium, Nemechek of Joe Gibbs Racing and Sam Mayer of JR Motorsports would finish 2nd and 3rd, respectively. Mayer would win the Dash 4 Cash after finishing ahead of Allmendinger, Hill, and Gragson.

== Background ==
Richmond Raceway (RR) is a 0.75 miles (1.21 km), D-shaped, asphalt race track located just outside Richmond, Virginia in unincorporated Henrico County. It hosts the NASCAR Cup Series, NASCAR Xfinity Series and the NASCAR Camping World Truck Series. Known as "America's premier short track", it has formerly hosted events such as the International Race of Champions, Denny Hamlin Short Track Showdown, and the USAC sprint car series. Due to Richmond Raceway's unique "D" shape which allows drivers to reach high speeds, Richmond has long been known as a short track that races like a superspeedway. With its multiple racing grooves, and proclivity for contact Richmond is a favorite among NASCAR drivers and fans.

=== Entry list ===
- (R) denotes rookie driver.
- (i) denotes driver who is ineligible for series driver points.

#	Driver	Team	Make
1	Sam Mayer	JR Motorsports	Chevrolet
02	Brett Moffitt	Our Motorsports	Chevrolet
2	Sheldon Creed (R)	Richard Childress Racing	Chevrolet
4	Bayley Currey	JD Motorsports	Chevrolet
5	Ryan Preece (i)	B. J. McLeod Motorsports	Ford
6	Ryan Vargas	JD Motorsports	Chevrolet
07	Joe Graf Jr.	SS-Green Light Racing	Ford
7	Justin Allgaier	JR Motorsports	Chevrolet
08	David Starr	SS-Green Light Racing	Ford
8	Josh Berry	JR Motorsports	Chevrolet
9	Noah Gragson	JR Motorsports	Chevrolet
10	Landon Cassill	Kaulig Racing	Chevrolet
11	Daniel Hemric	Kaulig Racing	Chevrolet
16	A. J. Allmendinger	Kaulig Racing	Chevrolet
18	John Hunter Nemechek (i)	Joe Gibbs Racing	Toyota
19	Brandon Jones	Joe Gibbs Racing	Toyota
21	Austin Hill (R)	Richard Childress Racing	Chevrolet
23	Anthony Alfredo	Our Motorsports	Chevrolet
26	Derek Griffith	Sam Hunt Racing	Toyota
27	Jeb Burton	Our Motorsports	Chevrolet
28	Kyle Sieg	RSS Racing	Ford
31	Myatt Snider	Jordan Anderson Racing	Chevrolet
34	Kyle Weatherman	Jesse Iwuji Motorsports	Chevrolet
35	Joey Gase	Emerling-Gase Motorsports	Ford
36	Alex Labbé	DGM Racing	Chevrolet
38	Parker Retzlaff	RSS Racing	Ford
39	Ryan Sieg	RSS Racing	Ford
44	Rajah Caruth	Alpha Prime Racing	Chevrolet
45	Howie DiSavino III	Alpha Prime Racing	Chevrolet
47	Brennan Poole	Mike Harmon Racing	Chevrolet
48	Jade Buford	Big Machine Racing	Chevrolet
51	Jeremy Clements	Jeremy Clements Racing	Chevrolet
52	Harrison Rhodes	Jimmy Means Racing	Chevrolet
54	Ty Gibbs	Joe Gibbs Racing	Toyota
55	Matt Mills	B. J. McLeod Motorsports	Chevrolet
66	J. J. Yeley	MBM Motorsports	Ford
68	Brandon Brown	Brandonbilt Motorsports	Chevrolet
77	Dillon Bassett	Bassett Racing	Chevrolet
78	Josh Williams	B. J. McLeod Motorsports	Chevrolet
91	Mason Massey	DGM Racing	Chevrolet
98	Riley Herbst	Stewart-Haas Racing	Ford
99	Stefan Parsons	B. J. McLeod Motorsports	Chevrolet
Official entry list

== Practice ==
The only 30-minute practice session was held on Saturday, April 2, at 8:30 AM EST. Ty Gibbs of Joe Gibbs Racing would set the fastest time in the session, with a time of 22.867 seconds and a speed of 118.074 mph (190.022 km/h).

Pos.	#	Driver	Team	Make	Time	Speed
1	18	Ty Gibbs	Joe Gibbs Racing	Toyota	22.867	118.074
2	78	Josh Williams	B. J. McLeod Motorsports	Chevrolet	22.907	117.868
3	99	Stefan Parsons	B. J. McLeod Motorsports	Chevrolet	22.908	117.863
Full practice results

== Qualifying ==
Qualifying was held on Saturday, April 2, at 9:00 AM EST. Since Richmond Raceway is a short track, the qualifying system used is a single-car, two-lap system with only one round. Whoever sets the fastest time in the round wins the pole.

Ty Gibbs of Joe Gibbs Racing scored the pole for the race, with a time of 22.161 seconds and a speed of 121.836 mph (196.076 km/h).

=== Full qualifying results ===
Pos.	#	Driver	Team	Make	Time	Speed
1	54	Ty Gibbs	Joe Gibbs Racing	Toyota	22.161	121.836
2	18	John Hunter Nemechek (i)	Joe Gibbs Racing	Toyota	22.296	121.098
3	9	Noah Gragson	JR Motorsports	Chevrolet	22.357	120.768
4	21	Austin Hill (R)	Richard Childress Racing	Chevrolet	22.393	120.573
5	19	Brandon Jones	Joe Gibbs Racing	Toyota	22.402	120.525
6	5	Ryan Preece (i)	B. J. McLeod Motorsports	Ford	22.413	120.466
7	51	Jeremy Clements	Jeremy Clements Racing	Chevrolet	22.447	120.283
8	39	Ryan Sieg	RSS Racing	Ford	22.471	120.115
9	16	A. J. Allmendinger	Kaulig Racing	Chevrolet	22.509	119.952
10	38	Parker Retzlaff	RSS Racing	Ford	22.514	119.925
11	1	Sam Mayer	JR Motorsports	Chevrolet	22.534	119.819
12	8	Josh Berry	JR Motorsports	Chevrolet	22.575	119.601
13	2	Sheldon Creed (R)	Richard Childress Racing	Chevrolet	22.638	119.268
14	7	Justin Allgaier	JR Motorsports	Chevrolet	22.645	119.232
15	02	Brett Moffitt	Our Motorsports	Chevrolet	22.667	119.116
16	11	Daniel Hemric	Kaulig Racing	Chevrolet	22.683	119.032
17	48	Jade Buford	Big Machine Racing	Chevrolet	22.720	118.838
18	99	Stefan Parsons	B. J. McLeod Motorsports	Chevrolet	22.756	118.650
19	23	Anthony Alfredo	Our Motorsports	Chevrolet	22.757	118.645
20	36	Alex Labbé	DGM Racing	Chevrolet	22.815	118.343
21	31	Myatt Snider	Jordan Anderson Racing	Chevrolet	22.847	118.177
22	44	Rajah Caruth	Alpha Prime Racing	Chevrolet	22.882	117.997
23	78	Josh Williams	B. J. McLeod Motorsports	Chevrolet	22.887	117.971
24	98	Riley Herbst	Stewart-Haas Racing	Ford	22.946	117.668
25	91	Mason Massey	DGM Racing	Chevrolet	22.974	117.524
26	68	Brandon Brown	Brandonbilt Motorsports	Chevrolet	23.024	117.269
27	07	Joe Graf Jr.	SS-Green Light Racing	Ford	23.074	117.015
28	6	Ryan Vargas	JD Motorsports	Chevrolet	23.078	116.995
29	34	Kyle Weatherman	Jesse Iwuji Motorsports	Chevrolet	23.092	116.924
30	47	Brennan Poole	Mike Harmon Racing	Chevrolet	23.115	116.807
31	26	Derek Griffith	Sam Hunt Racing	Toyota	23.120	116.782
32	4	Bayley Currey	JD Motorsports	Chevrolet	23.178	116.490
33	08	David Starr	SS-Green Light Racing	Ford	23.224	116.259
Qualified by owner's points
34	28	Kyle Sieg	RSS Racing	Ford	23.225	116.254
35	66	J. J. Yeley	MBM Motorsports	Ford	23.248	116.139
36	10	Landon Cassill	Kaulig Racing	Chevrolet	23.437	115.202
37	35	Joey Gase	Emerling-Gase Motorsports	Ford	23.487	114.957
38	27	Jeb Burton	Our Motorsports	Chevrolet	—	—
Failed to qualify
39	52	Harrison Rhodes	Jimmy Means Racing	Chevrolet	23.305	115.855
40	77	Dillon Bassett	Bassett Racing	Chevrolet	23.352	115.622
41	45	Howie DiSavino III	Alpha Prime Racing	Chevrolet	23.413	115.321
42	55	Matt Mills	B. J. McLeod Motorsports	Chevrolet	23.487	114.957
Official qualifying results
Official starting lineup

== Race results ==
Stage 1 Laps: 75

Pos.	#	Driver	Team	Make	Pts
1	18	John Hunter Nemechek (i)	Joe Gibbs Racing	Toyota	0
2	9	Noah Gragson	JR Motorsports	Chevrolet	9
3	8	Josh Berry	JR Motorsports	Chevrolet	8
4	16	A. J. Allmendinger	Kaulig Racing	Chevrolet	7
5	54	Ty Gibbs	Joe Gibbs Racing	Toyota	6
6	39	Ryan Sieg	RSS Racing	Ford	5
7	38	Parker Retzlaff	RSS Racing	Ford	4
8	19	Brandon Jones	Joe Gibbs Racing	Toyota	3
9	21	Austin Hill (R)	Richard Childress Racing	Chevrolet	2
10	1	Sam Mayer	JR Motorsports	Chevrolet	1

Stage 2 Laps: 75

Pos.	#	Driver	Team	Make	Pts
1	54	Ty Gibbs	Joe Gibbs Racing	Toyota	10
2	18	John Hunter Nemechek (i)	Joe Gibbs Racing	Toyota	0
3	8	Josh Berry	JR Motorsports	Chevrolet	8
4	39	Ryan Sieg	RSS Racing	Ford	7
5	16	A. J. Allmendinger	Kaulig Racing	Chevrolet	6
6	23	Anthony Alfredo	Our Motorsports	Chevrolet	5
7	1	Sam Mayer	JR Motorsports	Chevrolet	4
8	7	Justin Allgaier	JR Motorsports	Chevrolet	3
9	98	Riley Herbst	Stewart-Haas Racing	Ford	2
10	38	Parker Retzlaff	RSS Racing	Ford	1

Stage 3 Laps: 100

Fin.	St	#	Driver	Team	Make	Laps	Led	Status	Points
1	1	54	Ty Gibbs	Joe Gibbs Racing	Toyota	250	114	Running	56
2	2	18	John Hunter Nemechek (i)	Joe Gibbs Racing	Toyota	250	135	Running	0
3	11	1	Sam Mayer	JR Motorsports	Chevrolet	250	0	Running	39
4	9	16	A. J. Allmendinger	Kaulig Racing	Chevrolet	250	0	Running	46
5	24	98	Riley Herbst	Stewart-Haas Racing	Ford	250	0	Running	34
6	16	11	Daniel Hemric	Kaulig Racing	Chevrolet	250	0	Running	31
7	12	8	Josh Berry	JR Motorsports	Chevrolet	250	1	Running	46
8	26	68	Brandon Brown	Brandonbilt Motorsports	Chevrolet	250	0	Running	29
9	8	39	Ryan Sieg	RSS Racing	Ford	250	0	Running	40
10	10	38	Parker Retzlaff	RSS Racing	Ford	250	0	Running	32
11	38	27	Jeb Burton	Our Motorsports	Chevrolet	250	0	Running	26
12	19	23	Anthony Alfredo	Our Motorsports	Chevrolet	250	0	Running	30
13	5	19	Brandon Jones	Joe Gibbs Racing	Toyota	250	0	Running	27
14	14	7	Justin Allgaier	JR Motorsports	Chevrolet	250	0	Running	26
15	36	10	Landon Cassill	Kaulig Racing	Chevrolet	250	0	Running	22
16	6	5	Ryan Preece (i)	B. J. McLeod Motorsports	Ford	250	0	Running	0
17	25	91	Mason Massey	DGM Racing	Chevrolet	250	0	Running	20
18	4	21	Austin Hill (R)	Richard Childress Racing	Chevrolet	250	0	Running	21
19	20	36	Alex Labbé	DGM Racing	Chevrolet	250	0	Running	18
20	7	51	Jeremy Clements	Jeremy Clements Racing	Chevrolet	249	0	Running	17
21	3	9	Noah Gragson	JR Motorsports	Chevrolet	249	0	Running	25
22	13	2	Sheldon Creed (R)	Richard Childress Racing	Chevrolet	249	0	Running	15
23	33	08	David Starr	SS-Green Light Racing	Ford	248	0	Running	14
24	22	44	Rajah Caruth	Alpha Prime Racing	Chevrolet	248	0	Running	13
25	15	02	Brett Moffitt	Our Motorsports	Chevrolet	248	0	Running	12
26	31	26	Derek Griffith	Sam Hunt Racing	Toyota	247	0	Running	11
27	23	78	Josh Williams	B. J. McLeod Motorsports	Chevrolet	247	0	Running	10
28	29	34	Kyle Weatherman	Jesse Iwuji Motorsports	Chevrolet	246	0	Running	9
29	27	07	Joe Graf Jr.	SS-Green Light Racing	Ford	246	0	Running	8
30	21	31	Myatt Snider	Jordan Anderson Racing	Chevrolet	246	0	Running	7
31	32	4	Bayley Currey	JD Motorsports	Chevrolet	246	0	Running	6
32	35	66	J. J. Yeley	MBM Motorsports	Ford	245	0	Running	5
33	17	48	Jade Buford	Big Machine Racing	Chevrolet	245	0	Running	4
34	37	35	Joey Gase	Emerling-Gase Motorsports	Ford	245	0	Running	3
35	18	99	Stefan Parsons	B. J. McLeod Motorsports	Chevrolet	245	0	Running	2
36	28	6	Ryan Vargas	JD Motorsports	Chevrolet	243	0	Running	1
37	34	28	Kyle Sieg	RSS Racing	Ford	139	0	Engine	1
38	30	47	Brennan Poole	Mike Harmon Racing	Chevrolet	112	0	Rear Gear	1
Official race results

== Standings after the race ==
Drivers' Championship standings

Pos	Driver	Points
1	A. J. Allmendinger	303
2	Ty Gibbs	283 (-20)
3	Noah Gragson	283 (–20)
4	Josh Berry	227 (–76)
5	Justin Allgaier	216 (–87)
6	Sam Mayer	201 (–102)
7	Brandon Jones	199 (–104)
8	Daniel Hemric	197 (–106)
9	Austin Hill	193 (–110)
10	Ryan Sieg	191 (–112)
11	Riley Herbst	179 (–124)
12	Sheldon Creed	164 (–139)
Official driver's standings

- Note: Only the first 12 positions are included for the driver standings.

Previous race: 2022 Pit Boss 250	NASCAR Xfinity Series; 2022 season	Next race: 2022 Call 811 Before You Dig 250
