= 2021 Dead On Tools 250 =

Race details
- Race 32 of 33 in the 2021 NASCAR Xfinity Series season
- Date: October 30, 2021
- Location: Martinsville Speedway in Martinsville, Virginia
- Course: Permanent racing facility
- Course length: 0.526 miles (0.85 km)
- Distance: 250 laps, 131.50 mi (211.63 km)
- Average speed: 62.01 mph

Pole position
Driver	Austin Cindric	Team Penske
- Grid positions set by competition-based formula

Most laps led
Driver	Noah Gragson	JR Motorsports
- Laps: 153

Winner
No. 9	Noah Gragson	JR Motorsports

Television in the United States
- Network: NBCSN
- Announcers: Rick Allen, Jeff Burton, Steve Letarte, and Dale Earnhardt Jr.

The 2021 Dead On Tools 250 was a NASCAR Xfinity Series race that was held on October 30, 2021, at the Martinsville Speedway in Martinsville, Virginia. Contested over 250 laps on the 0.526 mi (0.847 km) oval, it was the 32nd race of the 2021 NASCAR Xfinity Series season, the sixth race of the Playoffs, and the final race of the Round of 8. JR Motorsports driver Noah Gragson, in a must-win situation to advance to the Round of 4, collected his third win of the season.

== Report ==
=== Background ===
Martinsville Speedway is a NASCAR-owned stock car racing track located in Henry County, in Ridgeway, Virginia, just to the south of Martinsville. At 0.526 miles (0.847 km) in length, it is the shortest track in the NASCAR Xfinity Series. The track was also one of the first paved oval tracks in NASCAR, being built in 1947 by H. Clay Earles. It is also the only remaining race track that has been on the NASCAR circuit from its beginning in 1948.

=== Entry list ===
- (R) denotes rookie driver.
- (i) denotes driver who is ineligible for series driver points.

No.	Driver	Team	Manufacturer
0	Jeffrey Earnhardt	JD Motorsports	Chevrolet
1	Michael Annett	JR Motorsports	Chevrolet
2	Myatt Snider	Richard Childress Racing	Chevrolet
02	Brett Moffitt	Our Motorsports	Chevrolet
4	Landon Cassill	JD Motorsports	Chevrolet
5	Matt Mills	B. J. McLeod Motorsports	Chevrolet
6	Ryan Vargas (R)	JD Motorsports	Chevrolet
7	Justin Allgaier	JR Motorsports	Chevrolet
07	Joe Graf Jr.	SS-Green Light Racing	Chevrolet
8	Sam Mayer (R)	JR Motorsports	Chevrolet
9	Noah Gragson	JR Motorsports	Chevrolet
10	Jeb Burton	Kaulig Racing	Chevrolet
11	Justin Haley	Kaulig Racing	Chevrolet
13	Timmy Hill (i)	MBM Motorsports	Toyota
15	Bayley Currey (i)	JD Motorsports	Chevrolet
16	A. J. Allmendinger	Kaulig Racing	Chevrolet
17	J. J. Yeley	SS-Green Light Racing with Rick Ware Racing	Toyota
18	Daniel Hemric	Joe Gibbs Racing	Toyota
19	Brandon Jones	Joe Gibbs Racing	Toyota
20	Harrison Burton	Joe Gibbs Racing	Toyota
22	Austin Cindric	Team Penske	Ford
23	Natalie Decker	Our Motorsports	Chevrolet
26	Colin Garrett	Sam Hunt Racing	Toyota
31	Josh Berry (R)	Jordan Anderson Racing	Chevrolet
36	Alex Labbé	DGM Racing	Chevrolet
39	Ryan Sieg	RSS Racing	Ford
44	Tommy Joe Martins	Martins Motorsports	Chevrolet
47	Kyle Weatherman	Mike Harmon Racing	Chevrolet
48	Jade Buford (R)	Big Machine Racing Team	Chevrolet
51	Jeremy Clements	Jeremy Clements Racing	Chevrolet
52	Spencer Boyd (i)	Means Racing	Chevrolet
54	Ty Gibbs (R)	Joe Gibbs Racing	Toyota
61	Stephen Leicht	Hattori Racing Enterprises	Toyota
66	David Starr	MBM Motorsports	Toyota
68	Brandon Brown	Brandonbilt Motorsports	Chevrolet
74	Mike Harmon	Mike Harmon Racing	Chevrolet
78	Akinori Ogata (i)	B. J. McLeod Motorsports	Chevrolet
90	Preston Pardus	DGM Racing	Chevrolet
92	Josh Williams	DGM Racing	Chevrolet
98	Riley Herbst	Stewart-Haas Racing	Ford
99	Ryan Ellis	B. J. McLeod Motorsports	Chevy
Official entry list

== Qualifying ==
Austin Cindric was awarded the pole for the race as determined by competition-based formula. Timmy Hill did not have enough points to qualify for the race.

=== Starting Lineups ===
Pos	No	Driver	Team	Manufacturer
1	22	Austin Cindric	Team Penske	Ford
2	54	Ty Gibbs (R)	Joe Gibbs Racing	Toyota
3	16	A. J. Allmendinger	Kaulig Racing	Chevrolet
4	11	Justin Haley	Kaulig Racing	Chevrolet
5	7	Justin Allgaier	JR Motorsports	Chevrolet
6	1	Michael Annett	JR Motorsports	Chevrolet
7	18	Daniel Hemric	Joe Gibbs Racing	Toyota
8	19	Brandon Jones	Joe Gibbs Racing	Toyota
9	9	Noah Gragson	JR Motorsports	Chevrolet
10	20	Harrison Burton	Joe Gibbs Racing	Toyota
11	8	Sam Mayer (R)	JR Motorsports	Chevrolet
12	2	Myatt Snider	Richard Childress Racing	Chevrolet
13	02	Brett Moffitt	Our Motorsports	Chevrolet
14	39	Ryan Sieg	RSS Racing	Ford
15	10	Jeb Burton	Kaulig Racing	Chevrolet
16	98	Riley Herbst	Stewart-Haas Racing	Ford
17	68	Brandon Brown	Brandonbilt Motorsports	Chevrolet
18	51	Jeremy Clements	Jeremy Clements Racing	Chevrolet
19	44	Tommy Joe Martins	Martins Motorsports	Chevrolet
20	15	Bayley Currey (i)	JD Motorsports	Chevrolet
21	6	Ryan Vargas (R)	JD Motorsports	Chevrolet
22	92	Josh Williams	DGM Racing	Chevrolet
23	4	Landon Cassill	JD Motorsports	Chevrolet
24	47	Kyle Weatherman	Mike Harmon Racing	Chevrolet
25	36	Alex Labbé	DGM Racing	Chevrolet
26	23	Natalie Decker	Our Motorsports	Chevrolet
27	0	Jeffrey Earnhardt	JD Motorsports	Chevrolet
28	17	J. J. Yeley	SS-Green Light Racing with Rick Ware Racing	Toyota
29	31	Josh Berry (R)	JR Motorsports	Chevrolet
30	26	Colin Garrett	Sam Hunt Racing	Toyota
31	48	Jade Buford (R)	Big Machine Racing Team	Chevrolet
32	07	Joe Graf Jr.	SS-Green Light Racing	Chevrolet
33	78	Akinori Ogata (i)	B. J. McLeod Motorsports	Toyota
34	99	Ryan Ellis	B. J. McLeod Motorsports	Chevrolet
35	5	Matt Mills	B. J. McLeod Motorsports	Chevrolet
36	66	David Starr	MBM Motorsports	Toyota
37	61	Stephen Leicht	Hattori Racing Enterprises	Toyota
38	90	Preston Pardus	DGM Racing	Chevrolet
39	52	Spencer Boyd (i)	Means Motorsports	Chevrolet
40	74	Mike Harmon	Mike Harmon Racing	Chevrolet
Official qualifying results

== Race ==
=== Race results ===
==== Stage Results ====
Stage One Laps: 60

Pos	No	Driver	Team	Manufacturer	Points
1	22	Austin Cindric	Team Penske	Ford	10
2	18	Daniel Hemric	Joe Gibbs Racing	Toyota	9
3	7	Justin Allgaier	JR Motorsports	Chevrolet	8
4	16	A. J. Allmendinger	Kaulig Racing	Chevrolet	7
5	31	Josh Berry (R)	Jordan Anderson Racing	Chevrolet	6
6	39	Ryan Sieg	RSS Racing	Ford	5
7	9	Noah Gragson	JR Motorsports	Chevrolet	4
8	1	Michael Annett	JR Motorsports	Chevrolet	3
9	17	J. J. Yeley	SS-Green Light Racing with Rick Ware Racing	Chevrolet	2
10	02	Brett Moffitt	Our Motorsports	Chevrolet	1

Stage Two Laps: 60

Pos	No	Driver	Team	Manufacturer	Points
1	9	Noah Gragson	JR Motorsports	Chevrolet	10
2	20	Harrison Burton	Joe Gibbs Racing	Toyota	9
3	54	Ty Gibbs (R)	Joe Gibbs Racing	Toyota	8
4	10	Jeb Burton	Kaulig Racing	Chevrolet	7
5	22	Austin Cindric	Team Penske	Ford	6
6	18	Daniel Hemric	Joe Gibbs Racing	Toyota	5
7	16	A. J. Allmendinger	Kaulig Racing	Chevrolet	4
8	98	Riley Herbst	Stewart-Haas Racing	Ford	3
9	51	Jeremy Clements	Jeremy Clements Racing	Chevrolet	2
10	2	Myatt Snider	Richard Childress Racing	Chevrolet	1

=== Final Stage Results ===
Laps: 130

Pos	Grid	No	Driver	Team	Manufacturer	Laps	Points	Status
1	9	9	Noah Gragson	JR Motorsports	Chevrolet	257	54	Running
2	1	22	Austin Cindric	Team Penske	Ford	257	51	Running
3	7	18	Daniel Hemric	Joe Gibbs Racing	Toyota	257	48	Running
4	11	8	Sam Mayer (R)	JR Motorsports	Chevrolet	257	33	Running
5	5	7	Justin Allgaier	JR Motorsports	Chevrolet	257	40	Running
6	8	19	Brandon Jones	Joe Gibbs Racing	Toyota	257	31	Running
7	3	16	A. J. Allmendinger	Kaulig Racing	Chevrolet	257	41	Running
8	25	36	Alex Labbé	DGM Racing	Chevrolet	257	29	Running
9	18	51	Jeremy Clements	Jeremy Clements Racing	Chevrolet	257	30	Running
10	16	98	Riley Herbst	Stewart-Haas Racing	Ford	257	30	Running
11	22	92	Josh Williams	DGM Racing	Chevrolet	257	26	Running
12	23	4	Landon Cassill	JD Motorsports	Chevrolet	257	25	Running
13	12	2	Myatt Snider	Richard Childress Racing	Chevrolet	257	25	Running
14	30	26	Colin Garrett	Sam Hunt Racing	Toyota	257	23	Running
15	32	07	Joe Graf Jr.	SS-Green Light Racing	Chevrolet	257	22	Running
16	28	17	J. J. Yeley	SS-Green Light Racing	Chevrolet	257	23	Running
17	31	48	Jade Buford (i)	Big Machine Racing Team	Chevrolet	257	20	Running
18	38	90	Preston Pardus	DGM Racing	Chevrolet	257	19	Running
19	13	02	Brett Moffitt	Our Motorsports	Chevrolet	257	19	Running
20	10	20	Harrison Burton	Joe Gibbs Racing	Toyota	257	26	Running
21	37	61	Stephen Leicht	Hattori Racing Enterprises	Toyota	257	16	Running
22	27	0	Jeffrey Earnhardt	JD Motorsports	Chevrolet	257	15	Running
23	34	99	Ryan Ellis	B. J. McLeod Motorsports	Chevrolet	257	14	Running
24	36	66	David Starr	MBM Motorsports	Toyota	257	13	Running
25	26	23	Natalie Decker	Our Motorsports	Chevrolet	257	12	Running
26	33	78	Akinori Ogata (i)	B. J. McLeod Motorsports	Toyota	257	0	Running
27	2	54	Ty Gibbs (R)	Joe Gibbs Racing	Toyota	257	18	Running
28	29	31	Josh Berry (R)	JR Motorsports	Chevrolet	256	15	Running
29	35	5	Matt Mills	B. J. McLeod Motorsports	Chevrolet	255	8	Running
30	39	52	Spencer Boyd (i)	Means Motorsports	Chevrolet	254	0	Running
31	14	39	Ryan Sieg	RSS Racing	Ford	253	11	Running
32	21	6	Ryan Vargas (R)	JD Motorsports	Chevrolet	249	5	Running
33	4	11	Justin Haley	Kaulig Racing	Chevrolet	222	4	Brakes
34	24	47	Kyle Weatherman	Mike Harmon Racing	Chevrolet	221	3	Running
35	20	15	Bayley Currey (i)	JD Motorsports	Chevrolet	212	0	Running
36	17	68	Brandon Brown	Brandonbilt Motorsports	Chevrolet	204	1	Accident
37	15	10	Jeb Burton	Kaulig Racing	Chevrolet	194	8	Accident
38	6	1	Michael Annett	JR Motorsports	Chevrolet	192	4	Accident
39	40	74	Mike Harmon	Mike Harmon Racing	Chevrolet	38	1	Overheating
40	19	44	Tommy Joe Martins	Martins Motorsports	Chevrolet	36	1	Rear Gear
Official race results

=== Race statistics ===
- Lead changes: 13 among 6 different drivers
- Cautions/Laps: 13 for 75
- Time of race: 2 hours, 10 minutes, and 48 seconds
- Average speed: 62.01 mph (99.80 km/h)

Previous race: 2021 Kansas Lottery 300	NASCAR Xfinity Series; 2021 season	Next race: 2021 Xfinity Series Championship Race
