= 2022 Pit Boss 250 =

Sixth race of the 2022 NASCAR Xfinity Series

Race details
- Race 6 of 33 in the 2022 NASCAR Xfinity Series
- Date: March 26, 2022
- Official name: Second Annual Pit Boss 250
- Location: Austin, Texas, Circuit of the Americas
- Course: Permanent racing facility
- Course length: 3.426 miles (5.514 km)
- Distance: 46 laps, 156.860 mi (252.442 km)
- Scheduled distance: 46 laps, 156.860 mi (252.442 km)
- Average speed: 70.640 mph (113.684 km/h)

Pole position
| Driver | Ty Gibbs | Joe Gibbs Racing |
- Time: 2:14.520

Most laps led
| Driver | A. J. Allmendinger | Kaulig Racing |
- Laps: 27

Winner
| No. 16 | A. J. Allmendinger | Kaulig Racing |

Television in the United States
- Network: Fox Sports 1
- Announcers: Adam Alexander, Kurt Busch, Joey Logano

Radio in the United States
- Radio: Performance Racing Network

The 2022 Pit Boss 250 was the sixth stock car race of the 2022 NASCAR Xfinity Series and the second iteration of the event. The race was held on Saturday, March 26, 2022, in Austin, Texas, at the Circuit of the Americas, a 3.426 miles (5.514 km) permanent road course. The race was run over 46 laps. A. J. Allmendinger of Kaulig Racing would win the race after leading the most laps. This was Allmendinger's eleventh career Xfinity Series win, and his first of the season. To fill out the podium, Austin Hill of Richard Childress Racing and Cole Custer of SS-Green Light Racing would finish second and third, respectively.

== Background ==
Circuit of the Americas (COTA) is a grade 1 FIA-specification motorsports facility located within the extraterritorial jurisdiction of Austin, Texas. It features a 3.426-mile (5.514 km) road racing circuit. The facility is home to the Formula One United States Grand Prix, and the Motorcycle Grand Prix of the Americas, a round of the FIM Road Racing World Championship. It previously hosted the Supercars Championship, the FIA World Endurance Championship, the IMSA SportsCar Championship, and IndyCar Series.

=== Entry list ===
- (R) denotes rookie driver.
- (i) denotes driver who is ineligible for series driver points.

| # | Driver | Team | Make |
|---|---|---|---|
| 1 | Sam Mayer | JR Motorsports | Chevrolet |
| 02 | Brett Moffitt | Our Motorsports | Chevrolet |
| 2 | Sheldon Creed (R) | Richard Childress Racing | Chevrolet |
| 4 | Bayley Currey | JD Motorsports | Chevrolet |
| 5 | Scott Heckert | B. J. McLeod Motorsports | Chevrolet |
| 6 | Ryan Vargas | JD Motorsports | Chevrolet |
| 07 | Cole Custer (i) | SS-Green Light Racing | Ford |
| 7 | Justin Allgaier | JR Motorsports | Chevrolet |
| 08 | Joe Graf Jr. | SS-Green Light Racing | Ford |
| 8 | Josh Berry | JR Motorsports | Chevrolet |
| 9 | Noah Gragson | JR Motorsports | Chevrolet |
| 10 | Landon Cassill | Kaulig Racing | Chevrolet |
| 11 | Daniel Hemric | Kaulig Racing | Chevrolet |
| 16 | A. J. Allmendinger | Kaulig Racing | Chevrolet |
| 18 | Bubba Wallace (i) | Joe Gibbs Racing | Toyota |
| 19 | Brandon Jones | Joe Gibbs Racing | Toyota |
| 21 | Austin Hill (R) | Richard Childress Racing | Chevrolet |
| 23 | Anthony Alfredo | Our Motorsports | Chevrolet |
| 26 | Parker Chase | Sam Hunt Racing | Toyota |
| 27 | Jeb Burton | Our Motorsports | Chevrolet |
| 28 | Patrick Gallagher | RSS Racing | Ford |
| 31 | Myatt Snider | Jordan Anderson Racing | Chevrolet |
| 34 | Jesse Iwuji (R) | Jesse Iwuji Motorsports | Chevrolet |
| 35 | Parker Kligerman (i) | Emerling-Gase Motorsports | Toyota |
| 36 | Alex Labbé | DGM Racing | Chevrolet |
| 38 | Will Rodgers | RSS Racing | Toyota |
| 39 | Ryan Sieg | RSS Racing | Ford |
| 44 | Sage Karam | Alpha Prime Racing | Chevrolet |
| 45 | Josh Bilicki | Alpha Prime Racing | Chevrolet |
| 47 | Brennan Poole | Mike Harmon Racing | Chevrolet |
| 48 | Jade Buford | Big Machine Racing | Chevrolet |
| 51 | Jeremy Clements | Jeremy Clements Racing | Chevrolet |
| 52 | Gar Robinson | Jimmy Means Racing | Chevrolet |
| 54 | Ty Gibbs | Joe Gibbs Racing | Toyota |
| 66 | J. J. Yeley | MBM Motorsports | Toyota |
| 68 | Brandon Brown | Brandonbilt Motorsports | Chevrolet |
| 78 | Josh Williams | B. J. McLeod Motorsports | Chevrolet |
| 88 | Miguel Paludo | JR Motorsports | Chevrolet |
| 91 | Preston Pardus | DGM Racing | Chevrolet |
| 92 | Ross Chastain (i) | DGM Racing | Chevrolet |
| 98 | Riley Herbst | Stewart-Haas Racing | Ford |
| 99 | Stefan Parsons | B. J. McLeod Motorsports | Chevrolet |
Official entry list

== Practice ==
The only 30-minute practice session was held on Friday, March 25, at 4:00 PM CST. Preston Pardus of DGM Racing would set the fastest time in the session, with a time of 2:16.851 seconds and a speed of 89.703 mph (144.363 km/h).

| Pos. | # | Driver | Team | Make | Time | Speed |
|---|---|---|---|---|---|---|
| 1 | 91 | Preston Pardus | DGM Racing | Chevrolet | 2:16.851 | 89.703 |
| 2 | 2 | Sheldon Creed (R) | Richard Childress Racing | Chevrolet | 2:17.043 | 89.578 |
| 3 | 36 | Alex Labbé | DGM Racing | Chevrolet | 2:17.197 | 89.477 |
Full practice results

== Qualifying ==
Qualifying was held on Friday, March 25, at 4:30 PM CST. Since Circuit of the Americas is a road course, the qualifying system is a two group system, with two rounds. Drivers will be separated into two groups, Group A and Group B. Each driver will have a lap to set a time. The fastest 5 drivers from each group will advance to the final round. Drivers will also have one lap to set a time. The fastest driver to set a time in the round will win the pole.

Ty Gibbs of Joe Gibbs Racing scored the pole for the race, with a time of 2:14.520 seconds and a speed of 91.258 mph (146.866 km/h).

=== Full qualifying results ===
| Pos | No. | Driver | Team | Manufacturer | Time (R1) | Speed (R1) | Time (R2) | Speed (R2) |
|---|---|---|---|---|---|---|---|---|
| 1 | 54 | Ty Gibbs | Joe Gibbs Racing | Toyota | 2:15.263 | 90.757 | 2:14.520 | 91.258 |
| 2 | 92 | Ross Chastain (i) | DGM Racing | Chevrolet | 2:15.438 | 90.639 | 2:15.096 | 90.869 |
| 3 | 07 | Cole Custer (i) | SS-Green Light Racing | Ford | 2:15.390 | 90.671 | 2:15.107 | 90.861 |
| 4 | 16 | A. J. Allmendinger | Kaulig Racing | Chevrolet | 2:15.197 | 90.801 | 2:15.598 | 90.532 |
| 5 | 36 | Alex Labbé | DGM Racing | Chevrolet | 2:16.022 | 90.250 | 2:15.853 | 90.362 |
| 6 | 2 | Sheldon Creed (R) | Richard Childress Racing | Chevrolet | 2:16.031 | 90.244 | 2:15.901 | 90.330 |
| 7 | 91 | Preston Pardus | DGM Racing | Chevrolet | 2:15.675 | 90.481 | 2:16.284 | 90.077 |
| 8 | 21 | Austin Hill (R) | Richard Childress Racing | Chevrolet | 2:15.323 | 90.716 | 2:16.323 | 90.051 |
| 9 | 7 | Justin Allgaier | JR Motorsports | Chevrolet | 2:15.700 | 90.464 | 2:16.338 | 90.041 |
| 10 | 1 | Sam Mayer | JR Motorsports | Chevrolet | 2:16.008 | 90.259 | 2:16.763 | 89.761 |
Eliminated from Round 1
| 11 | 35 | Parker Kligerman (i) | Emerling-Gase Motorsports | Toyota | 2:15.804 | 90.395 | — | — |
| 12 | 9 | Noah Gragson | JR Motorsports | Chevrolet | 2:15.949 | 90.299 | — | — |
| 13 | 02 | Brett Moffitt | Our Motorsports | Chevrolet | 2:16.131 | 90.178 | — | — |
| 14 | 10 | Landon Cassill | Kaulig Racing | Chevrolet | 2:16.185 | 90.142 | — | — |
| 15 | 18 | Bubba Wallace (i) | Joe Gibbs Racing | Toyota | 2:16.330 | 90.046 | — | — |
| 16 | 48 | Jade Buford | Big Machine Racing | Chevrolet | 2:16.373 | 90.018 | — | — |
| 17 | 88 | Miguel Paludo | JR Motorsports | Chevrolet | 2:16.569 | 89.889 | — | — |
| 18 | 23 | Anthony Alfredo | Our Motorsports | Chevrolet | 2:16.791 | 89.743 | — | — |
| 19 | 11 | Daniel Hemric | Kaulig Racing | Chevrolet | 2:16.944 | 89.642 | — | — |
| 20 | 27 | Jeb Burton | Our Motorsports | Chevrolet | 2:16.958 | 89.633 | — | — |
| 21 | 31 | Myatt Snider | Jordan Anderson Racing | Chevrolet | 2:16.999 | 89.606 | — | — |
| 22 | 98 | Riley Herbst | Stewart-Haas Racing | Ford | 2:17.005 | 89.603 | — | — |
| 23 | 26 | Parker Chase | Sam Hunt Racing | Toyota | 2:17.027 | 89.588 | — | — |
| 24 | 44 | Sage Karam | Alpha Prime Racing | Chevrolet | 2:17.450 | 89.312 | — | — |
| 25 | 8 | Josh Berry | JR Motorsports | Chevrolet | 2:17.521 | 89.266 | — | — |
| 26 | 51 | Jeremy Clements | Jeremy Clements Racing | Chevrolet | 2:17.675 | 89.167 | — | — |
| 27 | 45 | Josh Bilicki | Alpha Prime Racing | Chevrolet | 2:17.728 | 89.132 | — | — |
| 28 | 68 | Brandon Brown | Brandonbilt Motorsports | Chevrolet | 2:18.218 | 88.816 | — | — |
| 29 | 4 | Bayley Currey | JD Motorsports | Chevrolet | 2:18.415 | 88.690 | — | — |
| 30 | 28 | Patrick Gallagher | RSS Racing | Ford | 2:18.557 | 88.599 | — | — |
| 31 | 08 | Joe Graf Jr. | SS-Green Light Racing | Ford | 2:19.161 | 88.214 | — | — |
| 32 | 5 | Scott Heckert | B. J. McLeod Motorsports | Chevrolet | 2:19.338 | 88.102 | — | — |
| 33 | 99 | Stefan Parsons | B. J. McLeod Motorsports | Chevrolet | 2:20.077 | 87.638 | — | — |
Qualified by owner's points
| 34 | 6 | Ryan Vargas | JD Motorsports | Chevrolet | 2:20.206 | 87.557 | — | — |
| 35 | 39 | Ryan Sieg | RSS Racing | Ford | 2:21.689 | 86.640 | — | — |
| 36 | 66 | J. J. Yeley | MBM Motorsports | Toyota | 2:22.936 | 85.885 | — | — |
| 37 | 38 | Will Rodgers | RSS Racing | Toyota | 2:41.261 | 67.726 | — | — |
| 38 | 19 | Brandon Jones | Joe Gibbs Racing | Toyota | — | — | — | — |
Failed to qualify
| 39 | 47 | Brennan Poole | Mike Harmon Racing | Chevrolet | 2:20.093 | 87.628 | — | — |
| 40 | 52 | Gar Robinson | Jimmy Means Racing | Chevrolet | 2:20.140 | 87.598 | — | — |
| 41 | 78 | Josh Williams | B. J. McLeod Motorsports | Chevrolet | 2:21.317 | 86.869 | — | — |
| 42 | 34 | Jesse Iwuji (R) | Jesse Iwuji Motorsports | Chevrolet | 2:23.307 | 85.662 | — | — |
Official starting lineup

== Race results ==
Stage 1 Laps: 14

| Pos. | # | Driver | Team | Make | Pts |
|---|---|---|---|---|---|
| 1 | 16 | A. J. Allmendinger | Kaulig Racing | Chevrolet | 10 |
| 2 | 36 | Alex Labbé | DGM Racing | Chevrolet | 9 |
| 3 | 11 | Daniel Hemric | Kaulig Racing | Chevrolet | 8 |
| 4 | 35 | Parker Kligerman (i) | Emerling-Gase Motorsports | Toyota | 0 |
| 5 | 7 | Justin Allgaier | JR Motorsports | Chevrolet | 6 |
| 6 | 91 | Preston Pardus | DGM Racing | Chevrolet | 5 |
| 7 | 48 | Jade Buford | Big Machine Racing | Chevrolet | 4 |
| 8 | 26 | Parker Chase | Sam Hunt Racing | Toyota | 3 |
| 9 | 51 | Jeremy Clements | Jeremy Clements Racing | Chevrolet | 2 |
| 10 | 54 | Ty Gibbs | Joe Gibbs Racing | Toyota | 1 |

Stage 2 Laps: 16

| Pos. | # | Driver | Team | Make | Pts |
|---|---|---|---|---|---|
| 1 | 1 | Sam Mayer | JR Motorsports | Chevrolet | 10 |
| 2 | 48 | Jade Buford | Big Machine Racing | Chevrolet | 9 |
| 3 | 7 | Justin Allgaier | JR Motorsports | Chevrolet | 8 |
| 4 | 8 | Josh Berry | JR Motorsports | Chevrolet | 7 |
| 5 | 98 | Riley Herbst | Stewart-Haas Racing | Ford | 6 |
| 6 | 44 | Sage Karam | Alpha Prime Racing | Chevrolet | 5 |
| 7 | 92 | Ross Chastain (i) | DGM Racing | Chevrolet | 0 |
| 8 | 16 | A. J. Allmendinger | Kaulig Racing | Chevrolet | 3 |
| 9 | 9 | Noah Gragson | JR Motorsports | Chevrolet | 2 |
| 10 | 5 | Scott Heckert | B. J. McLeod Motorsports | Chevrolet | 1 |

Stage 3 Laps: 16

| Fin. | St | # | Driver | Team | Make | Laps | Led | Status | Points |
|---|---|---|---|---|---|---|---|---|---|
| 1 | 4 | 16 | A. J. Allmendinger | Kaulig Racing | Chevrolet | 46 | 27 | Running | 53 |
| 2 | 8 | 21 | Austin Hill (R) | Richard Childress Racing | Chevrolet | 46 | 0 | Running | 35 |
| 3 | 3 | 07 | Cole Custer (i) | SS-Green Light Racing | Ford | 46 | 0 | Running | 0 |
| 4 | 12 | 9 | Noah Gragson | JR Motorsports | Chevrolet | 46 | 0 | Running | 35 |
| 5 | 10 | 1 | Sam Mayer | JR Motorsports | Chevrolet | 46 | 3 | Running | 42 |
| 6 | 21 | 31 | Myatt Snider | Jordan Anderson Racing | Chevrolet | 46 | 0 | Running | 31 |
| 7 | 13 | 02 | Brett Moffitt | Our Motorsports | Chevrolet | 46 | 0 | Running | 30 |
| 8 | 16 | 48 | Jade Buford | Big Machine Racing | Chevrolet | 46 | 0 | Running | 42 |
| 9 | 17 | 88 | Miguel Paludo | JR Motorsports | Chevrolet | 46 | 0 | Running | 28 |
| 10 | 6 | 2 | Sheldon Creed (R) | Richard Childress Racing | Chevrolet | 46 | 0 | Running | 27 |
| 11 | 35 | 39 | Ryan Sieg | RSS Racing | Ford | 46 | 0 | Running | 26 |
| 12 | 11 | 35 | Parker Kligerman (i) | Emerling-Gase Motorsports | Toyota | 46 | 0 | Running | 0 |
| 13 | 18 | 23 | Anthony Alfredo | Our Motorsports | Chevrolet | 46 | 0 | Running | 24 |
| 14 | 7 | 91 | Preston Pardus | DGM Racing | Chevrolet | 46 | 0 | Running | 28 |
| 15 | 1 | 54 | Ty Gibbs | Joe Gibbs Racing | Toyota | 46 | 1 | Running | 23 |
| 16 | 24 | 44 | Sage Karam | Alpha Prime Racing | Chevrolet | 46 | 0 | Running | 26 |
| 17 | 2 | 92 | Ross Chastain (i) | DGM Racing | Chevrolet | 46 | 14 | Running | 0 |
| 18 | 38 | 19 | Brandon Jones | Joe Gibbs Racing | Toyota | 46 | 0 | Running | 19 |
| 19 | 23 | 26 | Parker Chase | Sam Hunt Racing | Toyota | 46 | 0 | Running | 21 |
| 20 | 28 | 68 | Brandon Brown | Brandonbilt Motorsports | Chevrolet | 46 | 0 | Running | 17 |
| 21 | 33 | 99 | Stefan Parsons | B. J. McLeod Motorsports | Chevrolet | 46 | 0 | Running | 16 |
| 22 | 30 | 28 | Patrick Gallagher | RSS Racing | Ford | 46 | 0 | Running | 15 |
| 23 | 20 | 27 | Jeb Burton | Our Motorsports | Chevrolet | 46 | 0 | Running | 14 |
| 24 | 26 | 51 | Jeremy Clements | Jeremy Clements Racing | Chevrolet | 46 | 0 | Running | 15 |
| 25 | 19 | 11 | Daniel Hemric | Kaulig Racing | Chevrolet | 46 | 0 | Running | 20 |
| 26 | 22 | 98 | Riley Herbst | Stewart-Haas Racing | Ford | 46 | 0 | Running | 17 |
| 27 | 25 | 8 | Josh Berry | JR Motorsports | Chevrolet | 46 | 0 | Running | 17 |
| 28 | 15 | 18 | Bubba Wallace (i) | Joe Gibbs Racing | Toyota | 46 | 0 | Running | 0 |
| 29 | 36 | 66 | J. J. Yeley | MBM Motorsports | Toyota | 46 | 0 | Running | 8 |
| 30 | 34 | 6 | Ryan Vargas | JD Motorsports | Chevrolet | 46 | 0 | Running | 7 |
| 31 | 14 | 10 | Landon Cassill | Kaulig Racing | Chevrolet | 46 | 0 | Running | 6 |
| 32 | 32 | 5 | Scott Heckert | B. J. McLeod Motorsports | Chevrolet | 46 | 0 | Running | 6 |
| 33 | 9 | 7 | Justin Allgaier | JR Motorsports | Chevrolet | 46 | 1 | Running | 18 |
| 34 | 31 | 08 | Joe Graf Jr. | SS-Green Light Racing | Ford | 46 | 0 | Running | 3 |
| 35 | 27 | 45 | Josh Bilicki | Alpha Prime Racing | Chevrolet | 46 | 0 | Running | 2 |
| 36 | 5 | 36 | Alex Labbé | DGM Racing | Chevrolet | 41 | 0 | Rear Gear | 10 |
| 37 | 37 | 38 | Will Rodgers | RSS Racing | Toyota | 34 | 0 | Running | 1 |
| 38 | 29 | 4 | Bayley Currey | JD Motorsports | Chevrolet | 13 | 0 | Engine | 1 |
Official race results

== Standings after the race ==
Drivers' Championship standings

| Pos | Driver | Points |
|---|---|---|
| 1 | Noah Gragson | 258 |
| 2 | A. J. Allmendinger | 257 (-1) |
| 3 | Ty Gibbs | 227 (–31) |
| 4 | Justin Allgaier | 190 (–68) |
| 5 | Josh Berry | 181 (–77) |
| 6 | Austin Hill | 172 (–86) |
| 7 | Brandon Jones | 172 (–86) |
| 8 | Daniel Hemric | 166 (–92) |
| 9 | Sam Mayer | 162 (–96) |
| 10 | Ryan Sieg | 151 (–107) |
| 11 | Sheldon Creed | 149 (–109) |
| 12 | Riley Herbst | 145 (–113) |
Official driver's standings

- Note: Only the first 12 positions are included for the driver standings.

| Previous race: 2022 Nalley Cars 250 | NASCAR Xfinity Series; 2022 season | Next race: 2022 ToyotaCare 250 |
