= 2021 Kansas Lottery 300 =

Race details
- Race 31 of 33 in the 2021 NASCAR Xfinity Series season
- Date: October 23, 2021
- Location: Kansas Speedway in Kansas City, Kansas
- Course: Permanent racing facility
- Course length: 1.50 miles (2.41 km)
- Distance: 200 laps, 300.00 mi (482.80 km)
- Average speed: 112.641

Pole position
Driver	Daniel Hemric	Joe Gibbs Racing
- Grid positions set by competition-based formula

Most laps led
Driver	Austin Cindric	Team Penske
- Laps: 151

Winner
No. 54	Ty Gibbs	Joe Gibbs Racing

Television in the United States
- Network: NBCSN
- Announcers: Rick Allen, Jeff Burton, Steve Letarte, and Dale Earnhardt Jr.

The 2021 Kansas Lottery 300 was a NASCAR Xfinity Series race that was held on October 23, 2021, at the Kansas Speedway in Kansas City, Kansas. Contested over 200 laps on the 1.50 mi (2.41 km) oval, it was the 31st race of the 2021 NASCAR Xfinity Series season, the fifth race of the Playoffs, and the second race of the Round of 8. Joe Gibbs Racing driver Ty Gibbs collected his fourth win of the season.

== Report ==
=== Background ===
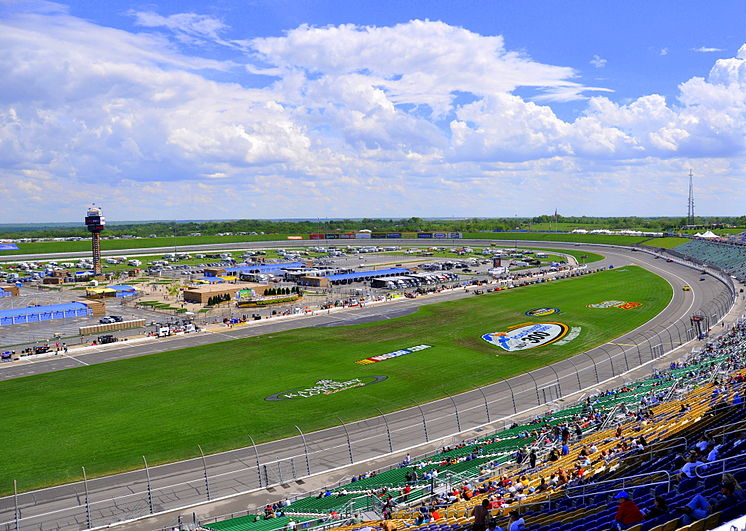
Kansas Speedway, the track where the race was held

Kansas Speedway is a 1.5-mile (2.4 km) tri-oval race track in Kansas City, Kansas. It was built in 2001, and it currently hosts two annual NASCAR race weekends. The IndyCar Series also held races at the venue until 2011. The speedway is owned and operated by the International Speedway Corporation.

=== Entry list ===
- (R) denotes rookie driver.
- (i) denotes driver who is ineligible for series driver points.

No.	Driver	Team	Manufacturer
0	Jeffrey Earnhardt	JD Motorsports	Chevrolet
1	Michael Annett	JR Motorsports	Chevrolet
2	Myatt Snider	Richard Childress Racing	Chevrolet
02	Brett Moffitt	Our Motorsports	Chevrolet
4	Landon Cassill	JD Motorsports	Chevrolet
5	Mason Massey	B. J. McLeod Motorsports	Toyota
6	Ryan Vargas (R)	JD Motorsports	Chevrolet
7	Justin Allgaier	JR Motorsports	Chevrolet
07	Joe Graf Jr.	SS-Green Light Racing	Chevrolet
8	Sam Mayer (R)	JR Motorsports	Chevrolet
9	Noah Gragson	JR Motorsports	Chevrolet
10	Jeb Burton	Kaulig Racing	Chevrolet
11	Justin Haley	Kaulig Racing	Chevrolet
13	Timmy Hill (i)	MBM Motorsports	Toyota
15	Bayley Currey (i)	JD Motorsports	Chevrolet
16	A. J. Allmendinger	Kaulig Racing	Chevrolet
17	Carson Ware	SS-Green Light Racing with Rick Ware Racing	Chevrolet
18	Daniel Hemric	Joe Gibbs Racing	Toyota
19	Brandon Jones	Joe Gibbs Racing	Toyota
20	Harrison Burton	Joe Gibbs Racing	Toyota
22	Austin Cindric	Team Penske	Ford
23	Patrick Emerling	Our Motorsports	Chevrolet
26	Dylan Lupton (i)	Sam Hunt Racing	Toyota
31	Jordan Anderson (i)	Jordan Anderson Racing	Chevrolet
36	Alex Labbé	DGM Racing	Chevrolet
39	Ryan Sieg	RSS Racing	Ford
44	Tommy Joe Martins	Martins Motorsports	Chevrolet
47	Kyle Weatherman	Mike Harmon Racing	Chevrolet
48	Jade Buford (R)	Big Machine Racing Team	Chevrolet
51	Jeremy Clements	Jeremy Clements Racing	Chevrolet
52	Joey Gase	Means Racing	Chevrolet
54	Ty Gibbs (R)	Joe Gibbs Racing	Toyota
61	Chad Finchum	Hattori Racing Enterprises	Toyota
66	David Starr	MBM Motorsports	Toyota
68	Brandon Brown	Brandonbilt Motorsports	Chevrolet
74	Gray Gaulding	Mike Harmon Racing	Chevrolet
78	Jesse Little	B. J. McLeod Motorsports	Chevrolet
90	Spencer Boyd (i)	DGM Racing	Chevrolet
92	Josh Williams	DGM Racing	Chevrolet
98	Riley Herbst	Stewart-Haas Racing	Ford
99	Matt Mills	B. J. McLeod Motorsports	Chevy
Official entry list

== Qualifying ==
Daniel Hemric was awarded the pole for the race as determined by competition-based formula. Timmy Hill did not have enough points to qualify for the race.

=== Starting Lineups ===
Pos	No	Driver	Team	Manufacturer
1	18	Daniel Hemric	Joe Gibbs Racing	Toyota
2	22	Austin Cindric	Team Penske	Ford
3	7	Justin Allgaier	JR Motorsports	Chevrolet
4	9	Noah Gragson	JR Motorsports	Chevrolet
5	16	A. J. Allmendinger	Kaulig Racing	Chevrolet
6	11	Justin Haley	Kaulig Racing	Chevrolet
7	1	Michael Annett	JR Motorsports	Chevrolet
8	20	Harrison Burton	Joe Gibbs Racing	Toyota
9	19	Brandon Jones	Joe Gibbs Racing	Toyota
10	54	Ty Gibbs (R)	Joe Gibbs Racing	Toyota
11	10	Jeb Burton	Kaulig Racing	Chevrolet
12	8	Sam Mayer (R)	JR Motorsports	Chevrolet
13	98	Riley Herbst	Stewart-Haas Racing	Ford
14	39	Ryan Sieg	RSS Racing	Ford
15	2	Myatt Snider	Richard Childress Racing	Chevrolet
16	02	Brett Moffitt	Our Motorsports	Chevrolet
17	44	Tommy Joe Martins	Martins Motorsports	Chevrolet
18	92	Josh Williams	DGM Racing	Chevrolet
19	51	Jeremy Clements	Jeremy Clements Racing	Chevrolet
20	6	Ryan Vargas (R)	JD Motorsports	Chevrolet
21	36	Alex Labbé	DGM Racing	Chevrolet
22	15	Bayley Currey (i)	JD Motorsports	Chevrolet
23	68	Brandon Brown	Brandonbilt Motorsports	Chevrolet
24	0	Jeffrey Earnhardt	JD Motorsports	Chevrolet
25	47	Kyle Weatherman	Mike Harmon Racing	Chevrolet
26	5	Mason Massey	B. J. McLeod Motorsports	Toyota
27	31	Jordan Anderson (i)	Jordan Anderson Racing	Chevrolet
28	26	Dylan Lupton (i)	Sam Hunt Racing	Toyota
29	78	Jesse Little	B. J. McLeod Motorsports	Chevrolet
30	07	Joe Graf Jr.	SS-Green Light Racing	Chevrolet
31	99	Matt Mills	B. J. McLeod Motorsports	Chevrolet
32	90	Spencer Boyd (i)	DGM Racing	Chevrolet
33	66	David Starr	MBM Motorsports	Toyota
34	23	Patrick Emerling	Our Motorsports	Chevrolet
35	48	Jade Buford (R)	Big Machine Racing Team	Chevrolet
36	61	Chad Finchum	Hattori Racing Enterprises	Toyota
37	52	Joey Gase	Means Motorsports	Chevrolet
38	4	Landon Cassill	JD Motorsports	Chevrolet
39	17	Carson Ware	SS-Green Light Racing with Rick Ware Racing	Chevrolet
40	74	Gray Gaulding	Mike Harmon Racing	Chevrolet
Official qualifying results

== Race ==
=== Race results ===
==== Stage Results ====
Stage One Laps: 45

Pos	No	Driver	Team	Manufacturer	Points
1	16	A. J. Allmendinger	Kaulig Racing	Chevrolet	10
2	18	Daniel Hemric	Joe Gibbs Racing	Toyota	9
3	22	Austin Cindric	Team Penske	Ford	8
4	54	Ty Gibbs (R)	Joe Gibbs Racing	Toyota	7
5	7	Justin Allgaier	JR Motorsports	Chevrolet	6
6	2	Myatt Snider	Richard Childress Racing	Chevrolet	5
7	9	Noah Gragson	JR Motorsports	Chevrolet	4
8	19	Brandon Jones	Joe Gibbs Racing	Toyota	3
9	11	Justin Haley	Kaulig Racing	Chevrolet	2
10	1	Michael Annett	JR Motorsports	Chevrolet	1

Stage Two Laps: 45

Pos	No	Driver	Team	Manufacturer	Points
1	22	Austin Cindric	Team Penske	Ford	10
2	54	Ty Gibbs (R)	Joe Gibbs Racing	Toyota	9
3	18	Daniel Hemric	Joe Gibbs Racing	Toyota	8
4	9	Noah Gragson	JR Motorsports	Chevrolet	7
5	2	Myatt Snider	Richard Childress Racing	Chevrolet	6
6	16	A. J. Allmendinger	Kaulig Racing	Chevrolet	5
7	20	Harrison Burton	Joe Gibbs Racing	Toyota	4
8	7	Justin Allgaier	JR Motorsports	Chevrolet	3
9	8	Sam Mayer (R)	JR Motorsports	Chevrolet	2
10	11	Justin Haley	Kaulig Racing	Chevrolet	1

=== Final Stage Results ===
Laps:110

Pos	Grid	No	Driver	Team	Manufacturer	Laps	Points	Status
1	10	54	Ty Gibbs	Joe Gibbs Racing	Toyota	200	56	Running
2	2	22	Austin Cindric	Team Penske	Ford	200	53	Running
3	5	16	A. J. Allmendinger	Kaulig Racing	Chevrolet	200	49	Running
4	6	11	Justin Haley	Kaulig Racing	Chevrolet	200	36	Running
5	14	39	Ryan Sieg	RSS Racing	Chevrolet	200	32	Running
6	16	02	Brett Moffitt	Our Motorsports	Chevrolet	200	31	Running
7	8	1	Michael Annett	JR Motorsports	Chevrolet	200	31	Running
8	12	8	Sam Mayer (R)	JR Motorsports	Chevrolet	200	31	Running
9	3	7	Justin Allgaier	JR Motorsports	Chevrolet	200	37	Running
10	15	2	Myatt Snider	Richard Childress Racing	Chevrolet	200	38	Running
11	9	19	Brandon Jones	Joe Gibbs Racing	Toyota	200	29	Running
12	11	10	Jeb Burton	Kaulig Racing	Chevrolet	200	25	Running
13	13	98	Riley Herbst	Stewart-Haas Racing	Ford	200	24	Running
14	23	68	Brandon Brown	Brandonbilt Motorsports	Chevrolet	200	23	Running
15	1	18	Daniel Hemric	Joe Gibbs Racing	Toyota	200	39	Running
16	22	15	Bayley Currey (i)	JD Motorsports	Chevrolet	200	0	Running
17	19	51	Jeremy Clements	Jeremy Clements Racing	Chevrolet	200	20	Running
18	39	17	Garrett Smithley	SS-Green Light Racing with Rick Ware Racing	Toyota	200	19	Running
19	38	4	Landon Cassill	JD Motorsports	Chevrolet	200	18	Running
20	27	31	Jordan Anderson (i)	Jordan Anderson Racing	Chevrolet	200	0	Running
21	25	47	Kyle Weatherman	Mike Harmon Racing	Chevrolet	200	16	Running
22	20	6	Ryan Vargas (R)	JD Motorsports	Chevrolet	200	15	Running
23	17	44	Tommy Joe Martins	Martins Motorsports	Chevrolet	199	14	Running
24	34	23	Patrick Emerling	Our Motorsports	Chevrolet	199	13	Running
25	31	99	Matt Mills	B. J. McLeod Motorsports	Chevrolet	199	12	Running
26	18	92	Josh Williams	DGM Racing	Chevrolet	198	11	Running
27	28	26	Dylan Lupton	Sam Hunt Racing	Toyota	198	10	Running
28	24	0	Jeffrey Earnhardt	JD Motorsports	Chevrolet	198	9	Running
29	30	07	Joe Graf Jr.	SS-Green Light Racing	Chevrolet	198	8	Running
30	29	78	Jesse Little	B. J. McLeod Motorsports	Chevrolet	197	7	Running
31	32	90	Spencer Boyd (i)	DGM Racing	Chevrolet	196	0	Running
32	36	61	Loris Hezemans	Hattori Racing Enterprises	Toyota	192	5	Running
33	21	36	Alex Labbé	DGM Racing	Chevrolet	191	4	Running
34	7	20	Harrison Burton	Joe Gibbs Racing	Toyota	178	7	Accident
35	4	9	Noah Gragson	JR Motorsorts	Chevrolet	178	13	Accident
36	33	66	David Starr	MBM Motorsports	Toyota	152	1	Running
37	26	5	Mason Massey	B. J. McLeod Motorsports	Toyota	133	1	Accident
38	35	48	Jade Buford (R)	Big Machine Racing Team	Chevrolet	28	1	Accident
39	40	74	Gray Gaulding	Mike Harmon Racing	Chevrolet	13	1	Engine
40	37	52	Joey Gase	Means Motorsports	Chevrolet	2	1	Electrical
Official race results

=== Race statistics ===
- Lead changes: 19 among 6 different drivers
- Cautions/Laps: 10 for 46
- Time of race: 2 hours, 39 minutes, and 48 seconds
- Average speed: 112.641 mph (181.278 km/h)

Previous race: 2021 Andy's Frozen Custard 335	NASCAR Xfinity Series; 2021 season	Next race: 2021 Dead On Tools 250
