= 2021 NASCAR Xfinity Series Championship Race =

2021 NASCAR Xfinity Series race at Phoenix Raceway

Race details
- Race 33 of 33 in the 2021 NASCAR Xfinity Series season
- Date: November 6, 2021
- Location: Phoenix Raceway in Avondale, Arizona
- Course: Permanent racing facility
- Course length: 1.00 miles (1.60 km)
- Distance: 200 laps, 200.000 mi (321.869 km)
- Average speed: 85.845

Pole position
Driver	Austin Cindric	Team Penske
- Time: 27.293

Most laps led
Driver	Austin Cindric	Team Penske
- Laps: 113

Winner
No. 18	Daniel Hemric	Joe Gibbs Racing

Television in the United States
- Network: NBC
- Announcers: Rick Allen, Dale Earnhardt Jr., Steve Letarte, and Jeff Burton

The 2021 NASCAR Xfinity Series Championship Race was a NASCAR Xfinity Series race held on November 6, 2021. It was contested over 200 laps on the 1.00-mile (1.61 km) oval. It was the thirty-third and final race of the 2021 NASCAR Xfinity Series season, as well as the championship race.

The race was Michael Annett's last before his retirement.

== Report ==
=== Background ===
Phoenix Raceway – also known as PIR – is a one-mile, low-banked tri-oval race track located in Avondale, Arizona. It is named after the nearby metropolitan area of Phoenix. The motorsport track opened in 1964 and currently hosts two NASCAR race weekends annually. PIR has also hosted the IndyCar Series, CART, USAC and the Rolex Sports Car Series. The raceway is currently owned and operated by International Speedway Corporation.

The raceway was originally constructed with a 2.5 mi (4.0 km) road course that ran both inside and outside of the main tri-oval. In 1991 the track was reconfigured with the current 1.51 mi (2.43 km) interior layout. PIR has an estimated grandstand seating capacity of around 67,000. Lights were installed around the track in 2004 following the addition of a second annual NASCAR race weekend.

=== Entry list ===
- (R) denotes rookie driver.
- (i) denotes driver who is ineligible for series driver points.

No.	Driver	Team	Manufacturer
0	Jeffrey Earnhardt	JD Motorsports	Chevrolet
1	Michael Annett	JR Motorsports	Chevrolet
2	Myatt Snider	Richard Childress Racing	Chevrolet
02	Brett Moffitt	Our Motorsports	Chevrolet
4	Landon Cassill	JD Motorsports	Chevrolet
5	Matt Mills	B. J. McLeod Motorsports	Chevrolet
6	Ryan Vargas (R)	JD Motorsports	Chevrolet
7	Justin Allgaier	JR Motorsports	Chevrolet
07	J. J. Yeley	SS-Green Light Racing	Chevrolet
8	Sam Mayer (R)	JR Motorsports	Chevrolet
9	Noah Gragson	JR Motorsports	Chevrolet
10	Jeb Burton	Kaulig Racing	Chevrolet
11	Justin Haley	Kaulig Racing	Chevrolet
13	Stephen Leicht	MBM Motorsports	Toyota
15	Bayley Currey (i)	JD Motorsports	Chevrolet
16	A. J. Allmendinger	Kaulig Racing	Chevrolet
17	Joe Graf Jr.	SS-Green Light Racing with Rick Ware Racing	Chevrolet
18	Daniel Hemric	Joe Gibbs Racing	Toyota
19	Brandon Jones	Joe Gibbs Racing	Toyota
20	Harrison Burton	Joe Gibbs Racing	Toyota
22	Austin Cindric	Team Penske	Ford
23	Blaine Perkins	Our Motorsports	Chevrolet
26	Dylan Lupton (i)	Sam Hunt Racing	Toyota
31	Sage Karam	Jordan Anderson Racing	Chevrolet
36	Alex Labbé	DGM Racing	Chevrolet
38	Ryan Sieg	RSS Racing	Ford
39	Kyle Sieg	RSS Racing	Ford
44	Tommy Joe Martins	Martins Motorsports	Chevrolet
47	Kyle Weatherman	Mike Harmon Racing	Chevrolet
48	Jade Buford (R)	Big Machine Racing Team	Chevrolet
51	Jeremy Clements	Jeremy Clements Racing	Chevrolet
52	Joey Gase	Means Racing	Chevrolet
54	John Hunter Nemechek (i)	Joe Gibbs Racing	Toyota
61	Timmy Hill (i)	Hattori Racing Enterprises	Toyota
66	David Starr	MBM Motorsports	Toyota
68	Brandon Brown	Brandonbilt Motorsports	Chevrolet
74	Ryan Ellis	Mike Harmon Racing	Chevrolet
78	Sheldon Creed (i)	B. J. McLeod Motorsports	Chevrolet
90	Spencer Boyd (i)	DGM Racing	Chevrolet
92	Josh Williams	DGM Racing	Chevrolet
98	Riley Herbst	Stewart-Haas Racing	Ford
99	Stefan Parsons	B. J. McLeod Motorsports	Chevrolet
Official entry list

== Practice ==
John Hunter Nemechek was the fastest in the first practice session with a time of 27.610 seconds and a speed of 130.388 mph (209.839 km/h).

Pos	No.	Driver	Team	Manufacturer	Time	Speed
1	54	John Hunter Nemechek	Joe Gibbs Racing	Toyota	27.610	130.388
2	22	Austin Cindric	Team Penske	Ford	27.632	130.284
3	18	Daniel Hemric	Joe Gibbs Racing	Toyota	27.729	129.828
Official first practice results

== Qualifying ==
Austin Cindric scored the pole position after a time of 27.293 seconds and a speed of 131.902 mph (212.276 km/h). Landon Cassill, Stephen Leicht, Spencer Boyd, Ryan Ellis, Timmy Hill, and Joey Gase failed to qualify.

=== Qualifying results ===
Pos	No	Driver	Team	Manufacturer	Time
1	22	Austin Cindric	Team Penske	Ford	27.293
2	54	John Hunter Nemechek (i)	Joe Gibbs Racing	Toyota	27.403
3	7	Justin Allgaier	JR Motorsports	Chevrolet	27.458
4	18	Daniel Hemric	Joe Gibbs Racing	Toyota	27.467
5	98	Riley Herbst	Stewart-Haas Racing	Ford	27.488
6	19	Brandon Jones	Joe Gibbs Racing	Toyota	27.498
7	9	Noah Gragson	JR Motorsports	Chevrolet	27.522
8	11	Justin Haley	Kaulig Racing	Chevrolet	27.544
9	10	Jeb Burton	Kaulig Racing	Chevrolet	27.593
10	78	Sheldon Creed (i)	B. J. McLeod Motorsports	Chevrolet	27.648
11	8	Sam Mayer (R)	JR Motorsports	Chevrolet	27.670
12	16	A. J. Allmendinger	Kaulig Racing	Chevrolet	27.699
13	1	Michael Annett	JR Motorsports	Chevrolet	27.707
14	38	Ryan Sieg	RSS Racing	Ford	27.765
15	48	Jade Buford (R)	Big Machine Racing Team	Chevrolet	27.799
16	92	Josh Williams	DGM Racing	Chevrolet	27.846
17	2	Myatt Snider	Richard Childress Racing	Chevrolet	27.859
18	39	Kyle Sieg	RSS Racing	Ford	27.921
19	68	Brandon Brown	Brandonbilt Motorsports	Chevrolet	27.926
20	02	Brett Moffitt	Our Motorsports	Chevrolet	27.932
21	23	Blaine Perkins	Our Motorsports	Chevrolet	27.932
22	51	Jeremy Clements	Jeremy Clements Racing	Chevrolet	27.943
23	44	Tommy Joe Martins	Martins Motorsports	Chevrolet	27.981
24	47	Kyle Weatherman	Mike Harmon Racing	Chevrolet	27.995
25	15	Bayley Currey (i)	JD Motorsports	Chevrolet	28.001
26	36	Alex Labbé	DGM Racing	Chevrolet	28.004
27	66	David Starr	MBM Motorsports	Toyota	28.013
28	99	Stefan Parsons	B. J. McLeod Motorsports	Chevrolet	28.025
29	07	J. J. Yeley	SS-Green Light Racing	Chevrolet	28.038
30	6	Ryan Vargas (R)	JD Motorsports	Chevrolet	28.043
31	0	Jeffrey Earnhardt	JD Motorsports	Chevrolet	28.043
32	26	Dylan Lupton	Sam Hunt Racing	Toyota	28.050
33	31	Sage Karam	Jordan Anderson Racing	Chevrolet	28.051
34	17	Joe Graf Jr.	SS-Green Light Racing with Rick Ware Racing	Chevrolet	28.069
35	5	Matt Mills	B. J. McLeod Motorsports	Chevrolet	28.235
36	20	Harrison Burton	Joe Gibbs Racing	Toyota	31.345
Did not qualify
37	4	Landon Cassill	JD Motorsports	Chevrolet	28.063
38	13	Stephen Leicht	MBM Motorsports	Toyota	28.162
39	90	Spencer Boyd	DGM Racing	Chevrolet	28.343
40	74	Ryan Ellis	Mike Harmon Racing	Chevrolet	28.389
41	61	Timmy Hill (i)	Hattori Racing Enterprises	Toyota	28.395
42	52	Joey Gase	Means Motorsports	Chevrolet	28.567
Official qualifying results

== Race ==
=== Race results ===
==== Stage Results ====
Stage One Laps: 45

Pos	No	Driver	Team	Manufacturer	Points
1	22	Austin Cindric	Team Penske	Ford	10
2	18	Daniel Hemric	Joe Gibbs Racing	Toyota	9
3	54	John Hunter Nemechek (i)	Joe Gibbs Racing	Toyota	0
4	7	Justin Allgaier	JR Motorsports	Chevrolet	7
5	9	Noah Gragson	JR Motorsports	Chevrolet	6
6	19	Brandon Jones	Joe Gibbs Racing	Toyota	5
7	16	A. J. Allmendinger	Kaulig Racing	Chevrolet	4
8	1	Michael Annett	JR Motorsports	Chevrolet	3
9	98	Riley Herbst	Stewart-Haas Racing	Ford	2
10	11	Justin Haley	Kaulig Racing	Chevrolet	1

Stage Two Laps: 45

Pos	No	Driver	Team	Manufacturer	Points
1	18	Daniel Hemric	Joe Gibbs Racing	Toyota	10
2	22	Austin Cindric	Team Penske	Ford	9
3	54	John Hunter Nemechek (i)	Joe Gibbs Racing	Toyota	0
4	7	Justin Allgaier	JR Motorsports	Chevrolet	7
5	9	Noah Gragson	JR Motorsports	Chevrolet	6
6	16	A. J. Allmendinger	Kaulig Racing	Chevrolet	5
7	11	Justin Haley	Kaulig Racing	Chevrolet	4
8	20	Harrison Burton	Joe Gibbs Racing	Toyota	3
9	1	Michael Annett	JR Motorsports	Chevrolet	2
10	98	Riley Herbst	Stewart-Haas Racing	Ford	1

=== Final Stage Results ===
Laps: 110 After 120 Xfinity Series starts, Daniel Hemric would come home to win at Phoenix. Additionally, he scored the championship as well.

Pos	Grid	No	Driver	Team	Manufacturer	Laps	Points	Status
1	4	18	Daniel Hemric	Joe Gibbs Racing	Toyota	204	40	Running
2	1	22	Austin Cindric	Team Penske	Ford	204	35	Running
3	36	20	Harrison Burton	Joe Gibbs Racing	Toyota	204	37	Running
4	5	98	Riley Herbst	Stewart-Haas Racing	Ford	204	36	Running
5	8	11	Justin Haley	Kaulig Racing	Chevrolet	204	37	Running
6	2	54	John Hunter Nemechek	Joe Gibbs Racing	Toyota	204	0	Running
7	6	19	Brandon Jones	Joe Gibbs Racing	Toyota	204	35	Running
8	20	02	Brett Moffitt	Our Motorsports	Chevrolet	204	29	Running
9	3	7	Justin Allgaier	JR Motorsports	Chevrolet	204	42	Running
10	10	78	Sheldon Creed	B. J. McLeod Motorsports	Chevrolet	204	0	Running
11	13	1	Michael Annett	JR Motorsports	Chevrolet	204	31	Running
12	7	9	Noah Gragson	JR Motorsports	Chevrolet	204	25	Running
13	11	8	Sam Mayer (R)	JR Motorsports	Chevrolet	204	24	Running
14	12	16	A. J. Allmendinger	Kaulig Racing	Chevrolet	204	23	Running
15	32	26	Dylan Lupton	Sam Hunt Racing	Toyota	204	22	Running
16	21	23	Blaine Perkins	Our Motorsports	Chevrolet	204	21	Running
17	14	38	Ryan Sieg	RSS Racing	Chevrolet	204	20	Running
18	22	51	Jeremy Clements	Jeremy Clements Racing	Chevrolet	204	19	Running
19	17	2	Myatt Snider	Richard Childress Racing	Chevrolet	204	18	Running
20	19	68	Brandon Brown	Brandonbilt Motorsports	Chevrolet	204	17	Running
21	27	66	David Starr	MBM Motorsports	Toyota	204	16	Running
22	29	07	J. J. Yeley	SS-Green Light Racing	Chevrolet	204	15	Running
23	9	10	Jeb Burton	Kaulig Racing	Chevrolet	204	14	Running
24	23	44	Tommy Joe Martins	Martins Motorsports	Chevrolet	204	13	Running
25	33	31	Sage Karam	Jordan Anderson Racing	Chevrolet	204	12	Running
26	24	47	Kyle Weatherman	Mike Harmon Racing	Chevrolet	204	11	Running
27	18	39	Kyle Sieg	RSS Racing	Ford	204	10	Running
28	30	6	Ryan Vargas (R)	JD Motorsports	Chevrolet	204	9	Running
29	35	5	Matt Mills	B. J. McLeod Motorsports	Chevrolet	204	8	Running
30	26	36	Alex Labbé	DGM Racing	Chevrolet	202	7	Running
31	25	15	Bayley Currey (i)	JD Motorsports	Chevrolet	200	0	Running
32	16	92	Josh Williams	DGM Racing	Chevrolet	194	5	Accident
33	15	48	Jade Buford (R)	Big Machine Racing Team	Chevrolet	193	4	Accident
34	28	99	Stefan Parsons	B. J. McLeod Motorsports	Chevrolet	123	3	Engine
35	34	17	Joe Graf Jr.	SS-Green Light Racing with Rick Ware Racing	Chevrolet	97	2	Accident
36	31	0	Jeffrey Earnhardt	JD Motorsports	Chevrolet	57	1	Accident
Official race results

=== Race statistics ===
- Lead changes: 16 among 5 different drivers
- Cautions/Laps: 10 for 61
- Time of race: 2 hours, 22 minutes, and 35 seconds
- Average speed: 85.845 mph (138.154 km/h)

Previous race: 2021 Dead On Tools 250	NASCAR Xfinity Series; 2021 season	Next race: 2022 Beef. It's What's for Dinner. 300
