= Jade Buford =

American racing driver (born 1988)

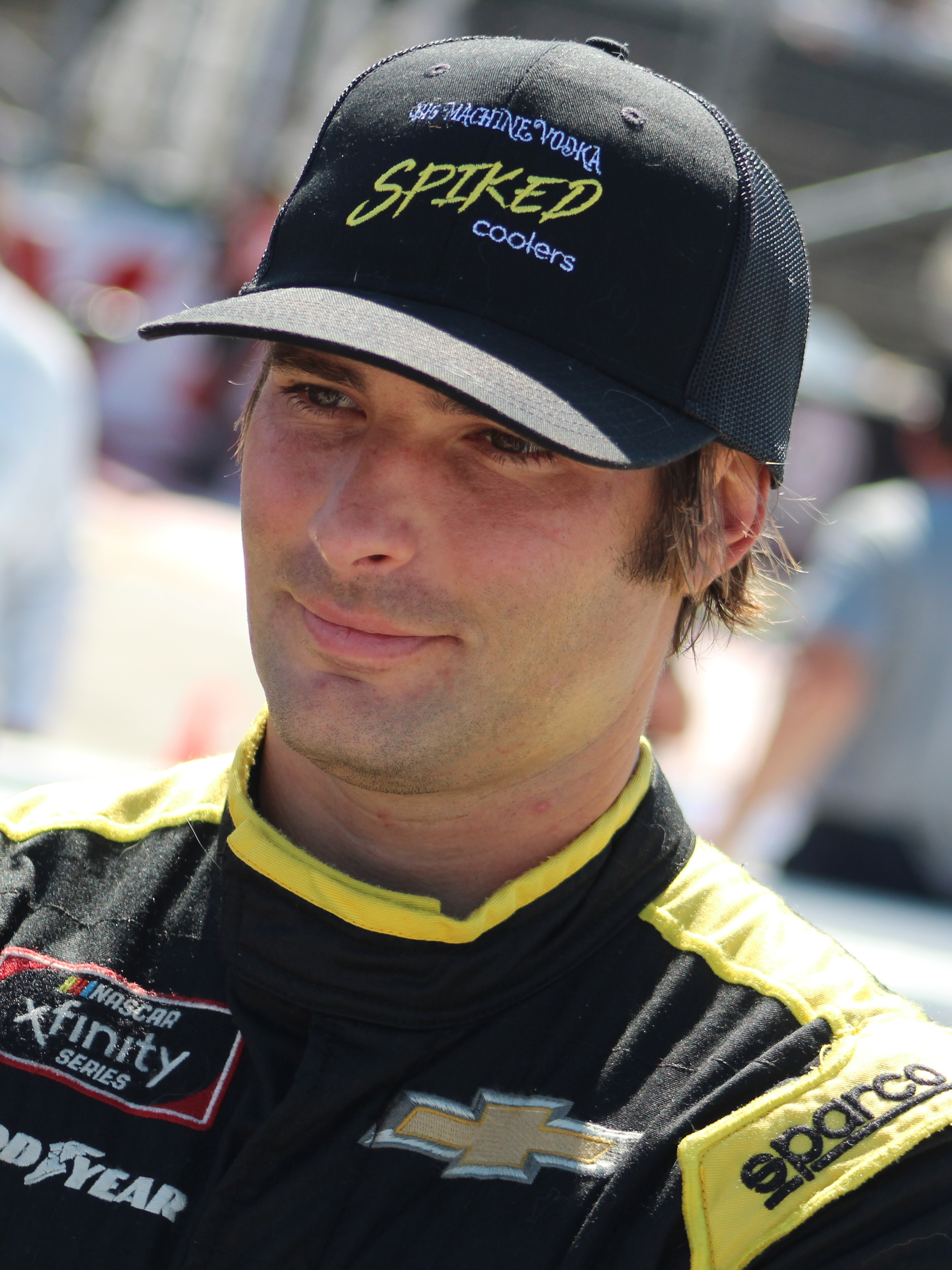
- Buford at Darlington Raceway in 2021
- Born: Jade Marcus Buford; February 15, 1988 (age 38); Houston, Texas, U.S.

NASCAR O'Reilly Auto Parts Series career
- 47 races run over 4 years
- 2023 position: 61st
- Best finish: 23rd (2021)
- First race: 2020 Pennzoil 150 (Indianapolis)
- Last race: 2023 Ag-Pro 300 (Talladega)
Wins	Top tens	Poles
0	3	0

NASCAR FedEx Freight Truck Series career
- 1 race run over 1 year
- 2022 position: 104th
- Best finish: 104th (2022)
- First race: 2022 DoorDash 250 (Sonoma)
- Last race: 2022 DoorDash 250 (Sonoma)
Wins	Top tens	Poles
0	0	0

Michelin Pilot Challenge career
- Debut season: 2009
- Current team: PF Racing
- Car number: 40
- Engine: Ford 5.2
- Co-driver: James Pesek, Shane Lewis
- Former teams: Multimatic Motorsports
- Best finish: 4th in 2013, 2014
- Finished last season: 11th (2019)

Previous series
- 2019 2019 2016–2018: British GT Championship; GT4 America Series; Pirelli World Challenge
- Statistics up to date as of June 11, 2023.

Jade Marcus Buford (born February 15, 1988) is an American professional racing driver with experience in open-wheel, sports car, and stock car racing. He last competed part-time in the NASCAR Xfinity Series driving No. 07 Chevrolet Camaro for SS-Green Light Racing.

Buford has also raced in the Pirelli World Challenge, British GT Championship, GT4 America Series, ARCA Menards Series, and the NASCAR Craftsman Truck Series.

== Racing career ==
Buford began his racing career when he was 18 years old, competing in Porsches; he was also an intern at the Porsche Driving School at Barber Motorsports Park. He debuted in Grand-Am's KONI Sports Car Challenge in 2009. He raced for RSR Motorsports in the ST class and shared the No. 196 Mini Cooper S with Owen Trinkler. In 2010, he joined Racers Edge Motorsports in the GS class of the renamed Continental Tire Sports Car Challenge.

Buford moved to Multimatic Motorsports in 2012, where he shared the No. 71 Aston Martin Vantage with Tõnis Kasemets en route to an 11th-place GS finish. The following year, he partnered with Scott Maxwell in Multimatic's No. 55, during which Buford recorded a series-record seven pole positions. The two remained together for 2014. Buford's co-driver in 2015 was sixteen-year-old Austin Cindric, who described Buford as "someone to lean on" during the early stages of his racing career. The duo recorded a victory at Canadian Tire Motorsport Park.

Buford began competing in the Pirelli World Challenge's GTS class in 2016 with Racers Edge. He swept the Barber Motorsports Park weekend from the pole, followed by a third win at Lime Rock Park after wrecks took out the leaders and a cleanup truck interfered with another.

Buford ran two Sports Car Challenge races in 2017 with Multimatic. Buford also returned to the Pirelli World Challenge, running in the GTS Pro class with Racers Edge, and won both races at Mosport.

Buford joined PF Racing for the 2018 PWC season. In the GTS SprintX race at Circuit of the Americas, he scored the Mustang GT4's maiden victory when he and Maxwell passed pole sitter Harry Gottsacker during pit stops; Buford explained "some of the cars have outright pace on us, but we just executed the perfect race." Buford recorded a second win that year at Watkins Glen International after beating Ian James to the finish by .208 seconds.

In 2019, Buford ran the full Michelin Pilot Challenge schedule with PF Racing, finishing 11th in the standings. He also began racing in the British GT Championship's Silver Cup for Multimatic alongside fellow American Chad McCumbee.

For the 2020 MPC season, Buford shared PF's No. 40 with James Pesek and Shane Lewis. In June, he dabbled in stock car racing when he joined SS-Green Light Racing to drive their No. 07 NASCAR Xfinity Series car in the Pennzoil 150 at the Indianapolis Motor Speedway road course. After starting 17th, Buford finished 14th in the event. Buford would make his second NASCAR start at Road America in the No. 6 for JD Motorsports, replacing the car's usual driver, B. J. McLeod.

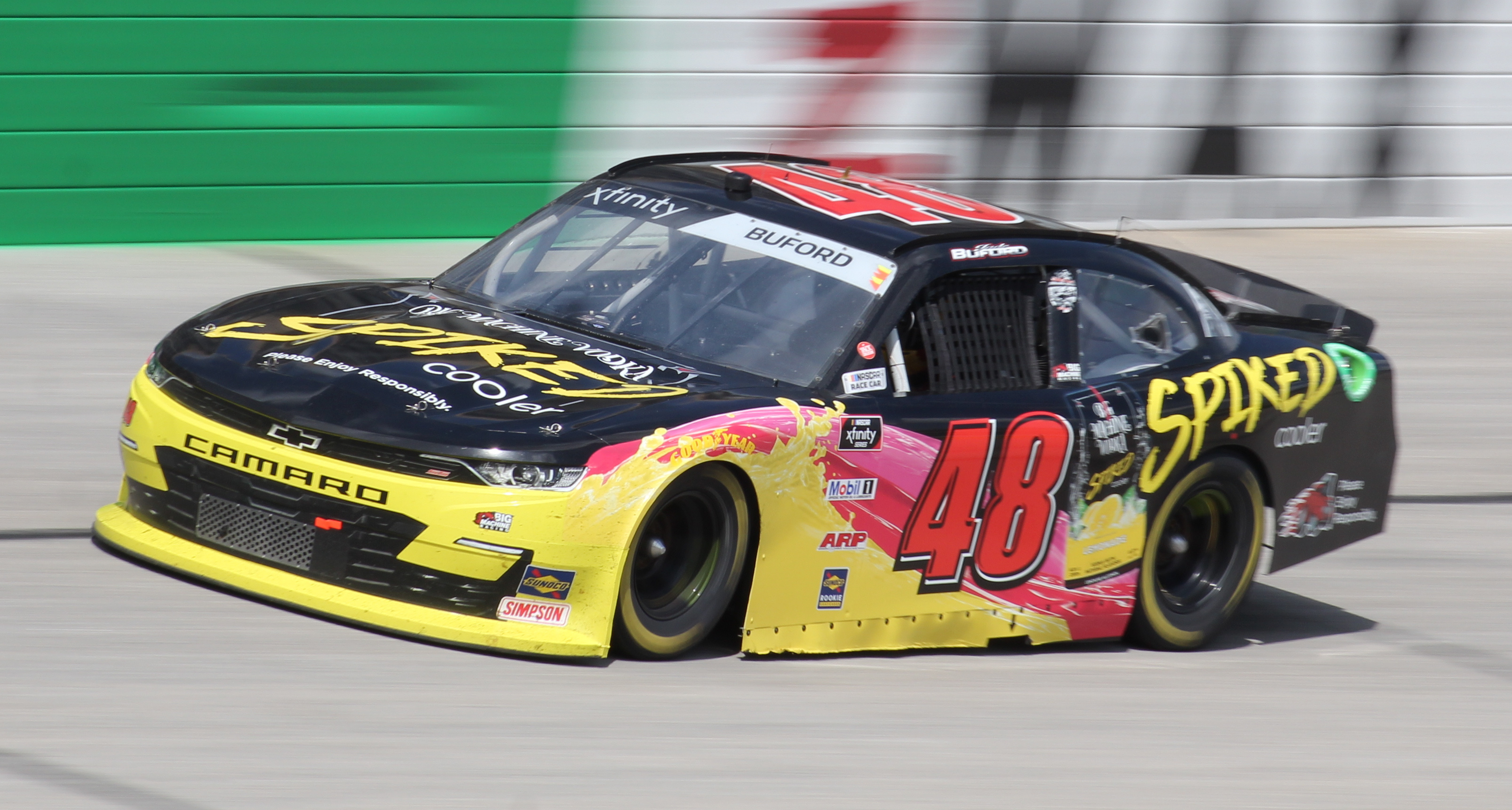
Buford in the No. 48 at Atlanta Motor Speedway in 2021

In 2021, Buford joined the newly-formed Big Machine Racing in the No. 48 Chevrolet for the full Xfinity season. His first race with the team came in the second round on the Daytona road course as he was not approved for the season opener on the oval. He went on to finish 23rd in the final points standings after recording sixteen top-twenty finishes with a best result of ninth at Michigan International Speedway. It was also during this year that Buford made select starts in the ARCA Menards Series and ARCA Menards Series East for Fast Track Racing, making his East series debut at Dover International Speedway, where he finished in ninth, and his main series debut at Pocono Raceway where he finished in eighth place.

Although he was slated to run another full-season with BMR in 2022, Buford only ran the first eight races of the year, where he only finished in the top-twenty once, an eighth place finish at the Circuit of the Americas, before being replaced by Kaz Grala for the following two events at Talladega Superspeedway and Dover International Speedway. He wouldn't make another start for the team that year until Portland International Raceway, where he finished in fourteenth. Buford also made his NASCAR Craftsman Truck Series debut at Sonoma Raceway, driving the No. 33 Toyota for Reaume Brothers Racing, where he finished in 33rd due to transmission issues.

In 2023, it was announced that Buford would run a second car for Big Machine Racing at Daytona International Speedway, the No. 5 Chevrolet. After qualifying for the race in twelfth, he went on to finish in 25th place. It was later announced that Buford would run the No. 5 at Talladega Superspeedway, where he qualified in fifth but finished in 36th after being involved in a multi-car crash early in the race.

== Personal life ==
Buford is a graduate of Auburn University. An avid rock climber, he participated in the show American Ninja Warrior in 2017 (Daytona Beach) and 2018 (Philadelphia), but was eliminated on the third obstacle in both attempts.

== Motorsports career results ==
=== NASCAR ===
(key) (Bold – Pole position awarded by qualifying time. Italics – Pole position earned by points standings or practice time. * – Most laps led.)

==== Xfinity Series ====
NASCAR Xfinity Series results
Year	Team	No.	Make	1	2	3	4	5	6	7	8	9	10	11	12	13	14	15	16	17	18	19	20	21	22	23	24	25	26	27	28	29	30	31	32	33	NXSC	Pts	Ref
2020	SS-Green Light Racing	07	Chevy	DAY	LVS	CAL	PHO	DAR	CLT	BRI	ATL	HOM	HOM	TAL	POC	IRC; 14	KEN	KEN	TEX	KAN		DRC; 16	DOV	DOV	DAY	DAR	RCH	RCH	BRI	LVS	TAL	ROV; 8	KAN	TEX	MAR	PHO	39th	105	
2020	JD Motorsports	6	Chevy																		ROA; 19																39th	105	
2021	Big Machine Racing	48	Chevy	DAY	DRC; 36	HOM; 20	LVS; 30	PHO; 20	ATL; 26	MAR; 19	TAL; 18	DAR; 35	DOV; 33	COA; 15	CLT; 17	MOH; 13	TEX; 16	NSH; 33	POC; 19	ROA; 34	ATL; 17	NHA; 18	GLN; 21	IRC; 20	MCH; 9	DAY; 28	DAR; 21	RCH; 36	BRI; 27	LVS; 26	TAL; 12	ROV; 16	TEX; 39	KAN; 38	MAR; 17	PHO; 33	23rd	435	
2022	Big Machine Racing	48	Chevy	DAY; 23	CAL; 37	LVS; 28	PHO; 28	ATL; 38	COA; 8	RCH; 33	MAR; 22	TAL	DOV	DAR	TEX	CLT	PIR; 14	NSH	ROA	ATL	NHA	POC	IRC	MCH	GLN	DAY	DAR	KAN	BRI	TEX	TAL	ROV	LVS	HOM	MAR	PHO	40th	127	
2023	Big Machine Racing	5	Chevy	DAY; 25	CAL	LVS	PHO	ATL	COA	RCH	MAR	TAL; 36	DOV	DAR	CLT	PIR	SON	NSH	CSC	ATL	NHA	POC	ROA	MCH	IRC	GLN	DAY	DAR	KAN	BRI	TEX	ROV	LVS	HOM	MAR	PHO	61st	13	
2024	Mike Harmon Racing	74	Chevy	DAY	ATL	LVS	PHO	COA	RCH	MAR	TEX	TAL	DOV	DAR	CLT; DNQ	PIR	SON	IOW	NHA; DNQ	NSH; DNQ	CSC	POC	IND	MCH	DAY	DAR	ATL										N/A	0	
2024	SS-Green Light Racing	07	Chevy																									GLN; DNQ	BRI	KAN	TAL	ROV	LVS	HOM	MAR	PHO	N/A	0	

==== Camping World Truck Series ====
NASCAR Gander Outdoors Truck Series results
Year	Team	No.	Make	1	2	3	4	5	6	7	8	9	10	11	12	13	14	15	16	17	18	19	20	21	22	23	NCWTC	Pts	Ref
2022	Reaume Brothers Racing	33	Toyota	DAY	LVS	ATL	COA	MAR	BRD	DAR	KAN	TEX	CLT	GTW	SON; 33	KNO	NSH	MOH	POC	IRP	RCH	KAN	BRI	TAL	HOM	PHO	104th	0^{1}	

^{*} Season still in progress

=== ARCA Menards Series ===
(key) (Bold – Pole position awarded by qualifying time. Italics – Pole position earned by points standings or practice time. * – Most laps led.)

ARCA Menards Series results
Year	Team	No.	Make	1	2	3	4	5	6	7	8	9	10	11	12	13	14	15	16	17	18	19	20	AMSC	Pts	Ref
2021	Fast Track Racing	11	Toyota	DAY	PHO	TAL	KAN	TOL	CLT	MOH	POC; 8	ELK	BLN	IOW	WIN	GLN	MCH	ISF	MLW	DSF				60th	62	
2021	Fast Track Racing	10	Toyota																		BRI; 18	SLM	KAN	60th	62	

==== ARCA Menards Series East ====
ARCA Menards Series East results
Year	Team	No.	Make	1	2	3	4	5	6	7	8	AMSEC	Pts	Ref
2021	Fast Track Racing	11	Ford	NSM	FIF	NSV	DOV; 9	SNM	IOW	MLW		27th	61	
2021	Fast Track Racing	10	Toyota								BRI; 18	27th	61	
