= 2021 Andy's Frozen Custard 335 =

Race details
- Race 30 of 33 in the 2021 NASCAR Xfinity Series season
- Texas Motor Speedway
- Date: October 16, 2021
- Location: Texas Motor Speedway in Fort Worth, Texas
- Course: Permanent racing facility
- Course length: 1.50 miles (2.41 km)
- Distance: 200 laps, 300.00 mi (482.80 km)
- Average speed: 115.544

Pole position
Driver	A. J. Allmendinger	Kaulig Racing
- Grid positions set by competition-based formula

Most laps led
Driver	John Hunter Nemechek	Joe Gibbs Racing
- Laps: 92

Winner
No. 54	John Hunter Nemechek	Joe Gibbs Racing

Television in the United States
- Network: NBCSN
- Announcers: Rick Allen, Brad Daugherty, Steve Letarte, and Dale Earnhardt Jr.

The 2021 Andy's Frozen Custard 335 was a NASCAR Xfinity Series race that was held on October 16, 2021, at the Texas Motor Speedway in Fort Worth, Texas. Contested over 200 laps on the 1.50 mi (2.41 km) oval, it was the 30th race of the 2021 NASCAR Xfinity Series season, the fourth race of the Playoffs, and the first race of the Round of 8. Joe Gibbs Racing driver John Hunter Nemechek collected his first win of the season, and the second of his career.

== Report ==
=== Background ===
Texas Motor Speedway is a speedway located in the northernmost portion of the U.S. city of Fort Worth, Texas – the portion located in Denton County, Texas. The track measures 1.5 miles (2.4 km) around and is banked 24 degrees in the turns, and is of the oval design, where the front straightaway juts outward slightly. The track layout is similar to Atlanta Motor Speedway and Charlotte Motor Speedway (formerly Lowe's Motor Speedway). The track is owned by Speedway Motorsports, Inc., the same company that owns Atlanta and Charlotte Motor Speedways, as well as the short-track Bristol Motor Speedway.

=== Entry list ===
- (R) denotes rookie driver.
- (i) denotes driver who is ineligible for series driver points.

No.	Driver	Team	Manufacturer
0	Jeffrey Earnhardt	JD Motorsports	Chevrolet
1	Michael Annett	JR Motorsports	Chevrolet
2	Myatt Snider	Richard Childress Racing	Chevrolet
02	Brett Moffitt	Our Motorsports	Chevrolet
4	Landon Cassill	JD Motorsports	Chevrolet
5	Mason Massey	B. J. McLeod Motorsports	Toyota
6	Ryan Vargas (R)	JD Motorsports	Chevrolet
7	Justin Allgaier	JR Motorsports	Chevrolet
07	Joe Graf Jr.	SS-Green Light Racing	Chevrolet
8	Sam Mayer (R)	JR Motorsports	Chevrolet
9	Noah Gragson	JR Motorsports	Chevrolet
10	Jeb Burton	Kaulig Racing	Chevrolet
11	Justin Haley	Kaulig Racing	Chevrolet
13	Timmy Hill (i)	MBM Motorsports	Toyota
15	Bayley Currey (i)	JD Motorsports	Chevrolet
16	A. J. Allmendinger	Kaulig Racing	Chevrolet
17	J. J. Yeley	SS-Green Light Racing with Rick Ware Racing	Chevrolet
18	Daniel Hemric	Joe Gibbs Racing	Toyota
19	Brandon Jones	Joe Gibbs Racing	Toyota
20	Harrison Burton	Joe Gibbs Racing	Toyota
22	Austin Cindric	Team Penske	Ford
23	Tanner Berryhill	Our Motorsports	Chevrolet
26	Dylan Lupton (i)	Sam Hunt Racing	Toyota
31	Kaz Grala (i)	Jordan Anderson Racing	Chevrolet
36	Alex Labbé	DGM Racing	Chevrolet
39	Ryan Sieg	RSS Racing	Ford
44	Tommy Joe Martins	Martins Motorsports	Chevrolet
47	Kyle Weatherman	Mike Harmon Racing	Chevrolet
48	Jade Buford (R)	Big Machine Racing Team	Chevrolet
51	Jeremy Clements	Jeremy Clements Racing	Chevrolet
52	Joey Gase	Means Racing	Chevrolet
54	John Hunter Nemechek (i)	Joe Gibbs Racing	Toyota
61	Austin Hill (i)	Hattori Racing Enterprises	Toyota
66	David Starr	MBM Motorsports	Ford
68	Brandon Brown	Brandonbilt Motorsports	Chevrolet
74	C. J. McLaughlin	Mike Harmon Racing	Chevrolet
78	Jesse Little	B. J. McLeod Motorsports	Chevrolet
90	Spencer Boyd (i)	DGM Racing	Chevrolet
92	Josh Williams	DGM Racing	Chevrolet
98	Riley Herbst	Stewart-Haas Racing	Ford
99	Matt Mills	B. J. McLeod Motorsports	Chevy
Official entry list

== Qualifying ==
A. J. Allmendinger was awarded the pole for the race as determined by competition-based formula. Timmy Hill did not have enough points to qualify for the race.

=== Starting Lineups ===
Pos	No	Driver	Team	Manufacturer
1	16	A. J. Allmendinger	Kaulig Racing	Chevrolet
2	22	Austin Cindric	Team Penske	Ford
3	18	Daniel Hemric	Joe Gibbs Racing	Toyota
4	11	Justin Haley	Kaulig Racing	Chevy
5	9	Noah Gragson	JR Motorsports	Chevy
6	7	Justin Allgaier	JR Motorsports	Chevy
7	19	Brandon Jones	Joe Gibbs Racing	Toyota
8	20	Harrison Burton	Joe Gibbs Racing	Toyota
9	1	Michael Annett	JR Motorsports	Chevrolet
10	54	John Hunter Nemechek (i)	Joe Gibbs Racing	Toyota
11	8	Sam Mayer (R)	JR Motorsports	Chevrolet
12	2	Myatt Snider	Richard Childress Racing	Chevrolet
13	10	Jeb Burton	Kaulig Racing	Chevrolet
14	51	Jeremy Clements	Jeremy Clements Racing	Chevrolet
15	92	Josh Williams	DGM Racing	Chevrolet
16	36	Alex Labbé	DGM Racing	Chevrolet
17	48	Jade Buford (R)	Big Machine Racing Team	Chevrolet
18	68	Brandon Brown	Brandonbilt Motorsports	Chevrolet
19	4	Landon Cassill	JD Motorsports	Chevrolet
20	98	Riley Herbst	Stewart-Haas Racing	Ford
21	61	Austin Hill (i)	Hattori Racing Enterprises	Toyota
22	39	Ryan Sieg	RSS Racing	Ford
23	0	Jeffrey Earnhardt	JD Motorsports	Chevrolet
24	44	Tommy Joe Martins	Martins Motorsports	Chevrolet
25	47	Kyle Weatherman	Mike Harmon Racing	Chevrolet
26	02	Brett Moffitt	Our Motorsports	Chevrolet
27	23	Tanner Berryhill	Our Motorsports	Chevrolet
28	90	Spencer Boyd (i)	DGM Racing	Chevrolet
29	26	Dylan Lupton (i)	Sam Hunt Racing	Toyota
30	6	Ryan Vargas (R)	JD Motorsports	Chevrolet
31	99	Matt Mills	B. J. McLeod Motorsports	Chevrolet
32	31	Kaz Grala (i)	Jordan Anderson Racing	Chevrolet
33	17	J. J. Yeley	SS-Green Light Racing with Rick Ware Racing	Chevrolet
34	78	Jesse Little	B. J. McLeod Motorsports	Chevrolet
35	5	Mason Massey	B. J. McLeod Motorsports	Toyota
36	66	David Starr	MBM Motorsports	Ford
37	52	Joey Gase	Means Motorsports	Chevrolet
38	07	Joe Graf Jr.	SS-Green Light Racing	Chevrolet
39	15	Bayley Currey (i)	B. J. McLeod Motorsports	Chevrolet
40	74	C. J. McLaughlin	Mike Harmon Racing	Chevrolet
Official qualifying results

== Race ==
=== Race results ===
==== Stage Results ====
Stage One Laps: 50

Pos	No	Driver	Team	Manufacturer	Points
1	22	Austin Cindric	Team Penske	Ford	10
2	9	Noah Gragson	JR Motorsports	Chevrolet	9
3	16	A. J. Allmendinger	Kaulig Racing	Chevrolet	8
4	7	Justin Allgaier	JR Motorsports	Chevrolet	7
5	1	Michael Annett	JR Motorsports	Chevrolet	6
6	11	Justin Haley	Kaulig Racing	Chevrolet	5
7	20	Harrison Burton	Joe Gibbs Racing	Toyota	4
8	51	Jeremy Clements	Jeremy Clements Racing	Chevrolet	3
9	02	Brett Moffitt	Our Motorsports	Chevrolet	2
10	68	Brandon Brown	Brandonbilt Motorsports	Chevrolet	1

Stage Two Laps: 50

Pos	No	Driver	Team	Manufacturer	Points
1	54	John Hunter Nemechek (i)	Joe Gibbs Racing	Toyota	0
2	18	Daniel Hemric	Joe Gibbs Racing	Toyota	9
3	8	Sam Mayer	JR Motorsports	Chevrolet	8
4	10	Jeb Burton	Kaulig Racing	Chevrolet	7
5	11	Justin Haley	Kaulig Racing	Chevrolet	6
6	98	Riley Herbst	Stewart-Haas Racing	Ford	5
7	1	Michael Annett	JR Motorsports	Chevrolet	4
8	7	Justin Allgaier	JR Motorsports	Chevrolet	3
9	9	Noah Gragson	JR Motorsports	Chevrolet	2
10	16	A. J. Allmendinger	Kaulig Racing	Chevrolet	1

=== Final Stage Results ===
Laps: 100

Pos	Grid	No	Driver	Team	Manufacturer	Laps	Points	Status
1	10	54	John Hunter Nemechek (i)	Joe Gibbs Racing	Toyota	200	0	Running
2	3	18	Daniel Hemric	Joe Gibbs Racing	Toyota	200	44	Running
3	5	9	Noah Gragson	JR Motorsports	Chevrolet	200	45	Running
4	6	7	Justin Allgaier	JR Motorsports	Chevrolet	200	43	Running
5	2	22	Austin Cindric	Team Penske	Ford	200	42	Running
6	1	16	A. J. Allmendinger	Kaulig Racing	Chevrolet	200	40	Running
7	4	11	Justin Haley	Kaulig Racing	Chevrolet	200	41	Running
8	8	20	Harrison Burton	Joe Gibbs Racing	Toyota	200	33	Running
9	9	1	Michael Annett	JR Motorsports	Chevrolet	200	38	Running
10	7	19	Brandon Jones	Joe Gibbs Racing	Toyota	200	27	Running
11	13	10	Jeb Burton	Kaulig Racing	Chevrolet	200	33	Running
12	20	98	Riley Herbst	Stewart-Haas Racing	Ford	200	30	Running
13	11	8	Sam Mayer (R)	JR Motorsports	Chevrolet	200	32	Running
14	22	39	Ryan Sieg	RSS Racing	Ford	200	23	Running
15	32	31	Kaz Grala (i)	Jordan Anderson Racing	Chevrolet	200	0	Running
16	26	02	Brett Moffitt	Our Motorsports	Chevrolet	200	23	Running
17	39	15	Bayley Currey (i)	JD Motorsports	Chevrolet	200	0	Running
18	24	44	Tommy Joe Martins	Martins Motorsports	Chevrolet	200	19	Running
19	15	92	Josh Williams	DGM Racing	Chevrolet	200	18	Running
20	21	61	Austin Hill (i)	Hattori Racing Enterprises	Toyota	199	0	Running
21	12	2	Myatt Snider	Richard Childress Racing	Chevrolet	199	16	Running
22	30	6	Ryan Vargas (R)	JD Motorsports	Chevrolet	199	15	Running
23	23	0	Jeffrey Earnhardt	JD Motorsports	Chevrolet	199	14	Running
24	16	36	Alex Labbé	DGM Racing	Chevrolet	199	13	Running
25	25	47	Kyle Weatherman	Mike Harmon Racing	Chevrolet	199	12	Running
26	38	07	Joe Graf Jr.	SS-Green Light Racing	Chevrolet	198	11	Running
27	35	5	Mason Massey	B. J. McLeod Motorsports	Toyota	196	10	Running
28	28	90	Spencer Boyd (i)	DGM Racing	Chevrolet	196	0	Running
29	14	51	Jeremy Clements	Jeremy Clements Racing	Chevrolet	196	11	Running
30	37	52	Joey Gase	Jimmy Means Racing	Chevrolet	195	7	Running
31	34	78	Jesse Little	B. J. McLeod Motorsports	Chevrolet	195	6	Running
32	31	99	Matt Mills	B. J. McLeod Motorsports	Chevrolet	193	5	Running
33	18	68	Brandon Brown	Brandonbilt Motorsports	Chevrolet	171	5	Accident
34	36	66	David Starr	MBM Motorsports	Toyota	152	3	Engine
35	40	74	C. J. McLaughlin	Mike Harmon Racing	Chevrolet	145	2	Suspension
36	19	4	Landon Cassill	JD Motorsports	Chevrolet	108	1	Electrical
37	27	23	Tanner Berryhill	Our Motorsports	Chevrolet	100	1	Accident
38	29	26	Dylan Lupton (i)	Sam Hunt Racing	Toyota	100	1	Accident
39	17	48	Jade Buford (R)	Big Machine Racing Team	Chevrolet	81	1	Accident
40	33	17	J. J. Yeley	SS-Green Light Racing	Chevrolet	37	1	Engine
Official race results

=== Race statistics ===
- Lead changes: 8 among 5 different drivers
- Cautions/Laps: 10 for 54
- Time of race: 2 hours, 35 minutes, and 48 seconds
- Average speed: 115.533 mph (185.932 km/h)

Previous race: 2021 Drive for the Cure 250	NASCAR Xfinity Series; 2021 season	Next race: 2021 Kansas Lottery 300
