= 2021 Drive for the Cure 250 =

Race details
- Race 29 of 33 in the 2021 NASCAR Xfinity Series season
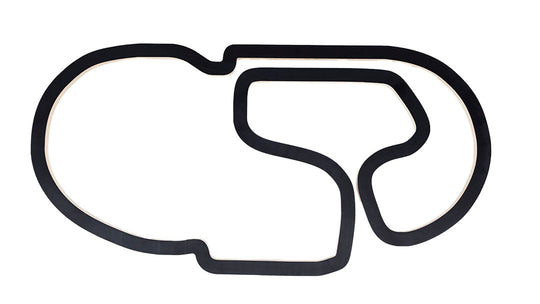
- Charlotte Motor Speedway Roval
- Date: October 9, 2021
- Location: Charlotte Motor Speedway in Concord, North Carolina
- Course: Permanent racing facility
- Course length: 3.67 km (2.28 miles)
- Distance: 67 laps, 152.76 mi (245.84 km)
- Average speed: 74.396

Pole position
Driver	Austin Cindric	Team Penske
- Grid positions set by competition-based formula

Most laps led
Driver	Austin Cindric	Team Penske
- Laps: 22

Winner
No. 16	A. J. Allmendinger	Kaulig Racing

Television in the United States
- Network: NBCSN
- Announcers: Rick Allen, Jeff Burton, Steve Letarte, and Dale Earnhardt Jr.

The 2021 Drive for the Cure 250 was a NASCAR Xfinity Series race that was held on October 9, 2021, at the Charlotte Motor Speedway in Concord, North Carolina. Contested over 68- extended from 67 laps due to an overtime finish—laps on the 2.28 mi (3.67 km) road course, it was the 29th race of the 2021 NASCAR Xfinity Series season, the third race of the Playoffs, and the final race of the Round of 12.

== Report ==
=== Background ===
Since 2018, deviating from past NASCAR events at Charlotte, the race will utilize a road course configuration of Charlotte Motor Speedway, promoted and trademarked as the "Roval". The course is 2.28 miles (3.67 km) in length and features 17 turns, utilizing the infield road course and portions of the oval track. The race will be contested over a scheduled distance of 109 laps, 400 kilometres (250 mi).

During July 2018 tests on the road course, concerns were raised over drivers "cheating" the backstretch chicane on the course. The chicanes were modified with additional tire barriers and rumble strips in order to encourage drivers to properly drive through them, and NASCAR will enforce drive-through penalties on drivers who illegally "short-cut" parts of the course. The chicanes will not be used during restarts. In the summer of 2019, the bus stop on the backstretch was changed and deepened, becoming a permanent part of the circuit, compared to the previous year where it was improvised.

If a driver fails to legally make the backstretch bus stop, the driver must skip the frontstretch chicane and make a complete stop by the dotted line on the exit before being allowed to continue. A driver who misses the frontstretch chicane must stop before the exit.

=== Entry list ===
- (R) denotes rookie driver.
- (i) denotes driver who is ineligible for series driver points.

No.	Driver	Team	Manufacturer
0	Jeffrey Earnhardt	JD Motorsports	Chevrolet
1	Michael Annett	JR Motorsports	Chevrolet
2	Myatt Snider	Richard Childress Racing	Chevrolet
02	Brett Moffitt	Our Motorsports	Chevrolet
4	Landon Cassill	JD Motorsports	Chevrolet
5	Matt Mills	B. J. McLeod Motorsports	Toyota
6	Ryan Vargas (R)	JD Motorsports	Chevrolet
7	Justin Allgaier	JR Motorsports	Chevrolet
07	Josh Bilicki (i)	SS-Green Light Racing	Chevrolet
8	Sam Mayer (R)	JR Motorsports	Chevrolet
9	Noah Gragson	JR Motorsports	Chevrolet
10	Jeb Burton	Kaulig Racing	Chevrolet
11	Justin Haley	Kaulig Racing	Chevrolet
13	Timmy Hill (i)	MBM Motorsports	Toyota
15	Kris Wright (i)	JD Motorsports/Sam Hunt Racing	Toyota
16	A. J. Allmendinger	Kaulig Racing	Chevrolet
17	Joe Graf Jr.	SS-Green Light Racing with Rick Ware Racing	Chevrolet
18	Daniel Hemric	Joe Gibbs Racing	Toyota
19	Brandon Jones	Joe Gibbs Racing	Toyota
20	Harrison Burton	Joe Gibbs Racing	Toyota
22	Austin Cindric	Team Penske	Ford
23	Ty Dillon	Our Motorsports	Chevrolet
26	Will Rodgers	Sam Hunt Racing	Toyota
31	Sage Karam	Jordan Anderson Racing	Chevrolet
36	Alex Labbé	DGM Racing	Chevrolet
39	Ryan Sieg	RSS Racing	Ford
44	Tommy Joe Martins	Martins Motorsports	Chevrolet
47	Kyle Weatherman	Mike Harmon Racing	Chevrolet
48	Jade Buford (R)	Big Machine Racing Team	Chevrolet
51	Jeremy Clements	Jeremy Clements Racing	Chevrolet
52	Spencer Boyd (i)	Means Racing	Chevrolet
54	Ty Gibbs (R)	Joe Gibbs Racing	Toyota
61	Austin Hill (i)	Hattori Racing Enterprises	Toyota
66	Loris Hezemans	MBM Motorsports	Ford
68	Brandon Brown	Brandonbilt Motorsports	Chevrolet
74	Gray Gaulding	Mike Harmon Racing	Chevrolet
78	Stefan Parsons	B. J. McLeod Motorsports	Chevrolet
90	Preston Pardus	DGM Racing	Chevrolet
92	Josh Williams	DGM Racing	Chevrolet
98	Riley Herbst	Stewart-Haas Racing	Ford
99	J. J. Yeley	B. J. McLeod Motorsports	Chevy
Official entry list

== Qualifying ==
Austin Cindric was awarded the pole for the race as determined by competition-based formula. Timmy Hill did not have enough points to qualify for the race.

=== Starting Lineups ===
Pos	No	Driver	Team	Manufacturer
1	22	Austin Cindric	Team Penske	Ford
2	7	Justin Allgaier	JR Motorsports	Chevrolet
3	18	Daniel Hemric	Joe Gibbs Racing	Toyota
4	1	Michael Annett	JR Motorsports	Chevy
5	11	Justin Haley	Kaulig Racing	Chevy
6	19	Brandon Jones	Joe Gibbs Racing	Toyota
7	10	Jeb Burton	Kaulig Racing	Chevrolet
8	20	Harrison Burton	Joe Gibbs Racing	Toyota
9	98	Riley Herbst	Stewart-Haas Racing	Ford
10	9	Noah Gragson	JR Motorsports	Chevrolet
11	51	Jeremy Clements	Jeremy Clements Racing	Chevrolet
12	54	Ty Gibbs (R)	Joe Gibbs Racing	Toyota
13	2	Myatt Snider	Richard Childress Racing	Chevrolet
14	16	A. J. Allmendinger	Kaulig Racing	Chevy
15	8	Sam Mayer (R)	JR Motorsports	Chevrolet
16	68	Brandon Brown	Brandonbilt Motorsports	Chevrolet
17	92	Josh Williams	DGM Racing	Chevrolet
18	39	Ryan Sieg	RSS Racing	Ford
19	48	Jade Buford (R)	Big Machine Racing Team	Chevrolet
20	36	Alex Labbé	DGM Racing	Chevrolet
21	44	Tommy Joe Martins	Martins Motorsports	Chevrolet
22	02	Brett Moffitt	Our Motorsports	Chevrolet
23	99	J. J. Yeley	B. J. McLeod Motorsports	Chevrolet
24	47	Kyle Weatherman	Mike Harmon Racing	Chevrolet
25	23	Ty Dillon	Our Motorsports	Chevrolet
26	5	Matt Mills	B. J. McLeod Motorsports	Toyota
27	6	Ryan Vargas (R)	JD Motorsports	Chevrolet
28	31	Sage Karam	Jordan Anderson Racing	Chevrolet
29	26	Will Rodgers	Sam Hunt Racing	Toyota
30	17	Joe Graf Jr.	SS-Green Light Racing with Rick Ware Racing	Chevrolet
31	07	Josh Bilicki (i)	SS-Green Light Racing	Chevrolet
32	0	Jeffrey Earnhardt	JD Motorsports	Chevrolet
33	52	Spencer Boyd (i)	Jimmy Means Racing	Chevrolet
34	66	Loris Hezemans	MBM Motorsports	Ford
35	4	Landon Cassill	JD Motorsports	Chevrolet
36	78	Stefan Parsons	B. J. McLeod Motorsports	Chevrolet
37	90	Preston Pardus	DGM Racing	Chevrolet
38	15	Kris Wright (i)	JD Motorsports/Sam Hunt Racing	Toyota
39	74	Gray Gaulding	Mike Harmon Racing	Chevrolet
40	61	Austin Hill (i)	Hattori Racing Enterprises	Toyota
Official qualifying results

== Race ==
=== Race results ===
==== Stage Results ====
Stage One Laps: 20

Pos	No	Driver	Team	Manufacturer	Points
1	18	Daniel Hemric	Joe Gibbs Racing	Toyota	10
2	16	A. J. Allmendinger	Kaulig Racing	Chevrolet	9
3	9	Noah Gragson	JR Motorsports	Chevrolet	8
4	54	Ty Gibbs (R)	Joe Gibbs Racing	Toyota	7
5	11	Justin Haley	Kaulig Racing	Chevrolet	6
6	19	Brandon Jones	Joe Gibbs Racing	Toyota	5
7	98	Riley Herbst	Stewart-Haas Racing	Ford	4
8	20	Harrison Burton	Joe Gibbs Racing	Toyota	3
9	10	Jeb Burton	Kaulig Racing	Chevrolet	2
10	51	Jeremy Clements	Jeremy Clements Racing	Chevrolet	1

Stage Two Laps: 20

Pos	No	Driver	Team	Manufacturer	Points
1	18	Daniel Hemric	Joe Gibbs Racing	Toyota	10
2	11	Justin Haley	Kaulig Racing	Chevrolet	9
3	2	Myatt Snider	Richard Childress Racing	Chevrolet	8
4	9	Noah Gragson	JR Motorsports	Chevrolet	7
5	51	Jeremy Clements	Jeremy Clements Racing	Chevrolet	6
6	19	Brandon Jones	Joe Gibbs Racing	Toyota	5
7	20	Harrison Burton	Joe Gibbs Racing	Toyota	4
8	54	Ty Gibbs (R)	Joe Gibbs Racing	Toyota	3
9	10	Jeb Burton	Kaulig Racing	Chevrolet	2
10	8	Sam Mayer (R)	JR Motorsports	Chevrolet	1

=== Final Stage Results ===
Laps: 27

Pos	Grid	No	Driver	Team	Manufacturer	Laps	Points	Status
1	14	16	A. J. Allmendinger	Kaulig Racing	Chevrolet	68	49	Running
2	1	22	Austin Cindric	Team Penske	Ford	68	35	Running
3	3	18	Daniel Hemric	Joe Gibbs Racing	Toyota	68	54	Running
4	5	11	Justin Haley	Kaulig Racing	Chevrolet	68	48	Running
5	6	19	Brandon Jones	Joe Gibbs Racing	Toyota	68	48	Running
6	10	9	Noah Gragson	JR Motorsports	Chevrolet	68	42	Running
7	37	90	Preston Pardus	DGM Racing	Chevrolet	68	30	Running
8	13	2	Myatt Snider	Richard Childress Racing	Chevrolet	68	37	Running
9	2	7	Justin Allgaier	JR Motorsports	Chevrolet	68	28	Running
10	15	8	Sam Mayer (R)	JR Motorsports	Chevrolet	68	28	Running
11	17	92	Josh Williams	DGM Racing	Chevrolet	68	26	Running
12	11	51	Jeremy Clements	Jeremy Clements Racing	Chevrolet	68	32	Running
13	7	10	Jeb Burton	Kaulig Racing	Chevrolet	68	28	Running
14	20	36	Alex Labbé	DGM Racing	Chevrolet	68	23	Running
15	8	20	Harrison Burton	Joe Gibbs Racing	Toyota	68	29	Running
16	19	48	Jade Buford (R)	Big Machine Racing Team	Chevrolet	68	21	Running
17	35	4	Landon Cassill	JD Motorsports	Chevrolet	68	20	Running
18	40	61	Austin Hill (i)	Hattori Racing Enterprises	Toyota	68	0	Running
19	23	99	J. J. Yeley	B. J. McLeod Motorsports	Chevrolet	68	18	Running
20	32	0	Jeffrey Earnhardt	JD Motorsports	Chevrolet	68	17	Running
21	12	54	Ty Gibbs (R)	Joe Gibbs Racing	Toyota	68	26	Running
22	16	68	Brandon Brown	Brandonbilt Motorsports	Chevrolet	68	15	Running
23	24	47	Kyle Weatherman	Mike Harmon Racing	Chevrolet	68	14	Running
24	36	78	Stefan Parsons	B. J. McLeod Motorsports	Chevrolet	68	13	Running
25	28	31	Sage Karam	Jordan Anderson Racing	Chevrolet	68	12	Running
26	25	23	Ty Dillon	Our Motorsports	Chevrolet	68	11	Running
27	4	1	Michael Annett	JR Motorsports	Chevrolet	68	10	Running
28	30	17	Joe Graf Jr.	SS-Green Light Racing with Rick Ware Racing	Chevrolet	67	9	Running
29	29	26	Will Rodgers	Sam Hunt Racing	Toyota	67	8	Running
30	26	5	Matt Mills	B. J. McLeod Motorsports	Toyota	67	7	Running
31	33	52	Spencer Boyd (i)	DGM Racing	Chevrolet	67	0	Running
32	18	39	Ryan Sieg	RSS Racing	Ford	66	5	Running
33	21	44	Tommy Joe Martins	Martins Motorsports	Chevrolet	63	4	Accident
34	9	98	Riley Herbst	Stewart-Haas Racing	Ford	61	7	Suspension
35	34	66	Loris Hezemans	MBM Motorsports	Ford	59	2	Electrical
36	27	6	Ryan Vargas	JD Motorsports	Chevrolet	47	1	Axle
37	22	02	Brett Moffitt	Our Motorsports	Chevrolet	30	1	Accident
38	31	07	Josh Bilicki	SS-Green Light Racing	Chevrolet	28	1	Accident
39	38	15	Kris Wright (i)	JD Motorsports/Sam Hunt Racing	Toyota	19	0	Suspension
40	39	74	Gray Gaulding	Mike Harmon Racing	Chevrolet	10	1	Rear gear
Official race results

=== Race statistics ===
- Lead changes: 6 among 5 different drivers
- Cautions/Laps: 7 for 13
- Time of race: 2 hours, 7 minutes, and 14 seconds
- Average speed: 74.396 mph (119.729 km/h)

Previous race: 2021 Sparks 300	NASCAR Xfinity Series; 2021 season	Next race: 2021 Andy's Frozen Custard 335
