= 2020 Pennzoil 150 =

NASCAR Xfinity Series race

Race details
- Race 13 of 33 in the 2020 NASCAR Xfinity Series season
- Date: July 4, 2020
- Location: Indianapolis Motor Speedway in Speedway, Indiana
- Course: Permanent racing facility
- Course length: 2.439 miles (3.93 km)
- Distance: 62 laps, 151.218 mi (243.63 km)

Pole position
Driver	Jeb Burton	JR Motorsports
- Grid positions set by ballot

Most laps led
Driver	Chase Briscoe	Stewart-Haas Racing
- Laps: 30

Winner
No. 98	Chase Briscoe	Stewart-Haas Racing

Television in the United States
- Network: NBC
- Announcers: Rick Allen, Jeff Burton, Steve Letarte, and Dale Earnhardt Jr.

Radio in the United States
- Radio: IMS

The 2020 Pennzoil 150, branded as the Pennzoil 150 at the Brickyard, was a NASCAR Xfinity Series race held on July 4, 2020, at the road course at Indianapolis Motor Speedway in Speedway, Indiana. Contested over 62 laps on the 2.439-mile (3.925 km) road course, it was the 13th race of the 2020 NASCAR Xfinity Series season and the Xfinity Series' first ever race at IMS's 14-turn road course layout. Chase Briscoe picked up his third win in the last four races.

== Report ==
=== Background ===
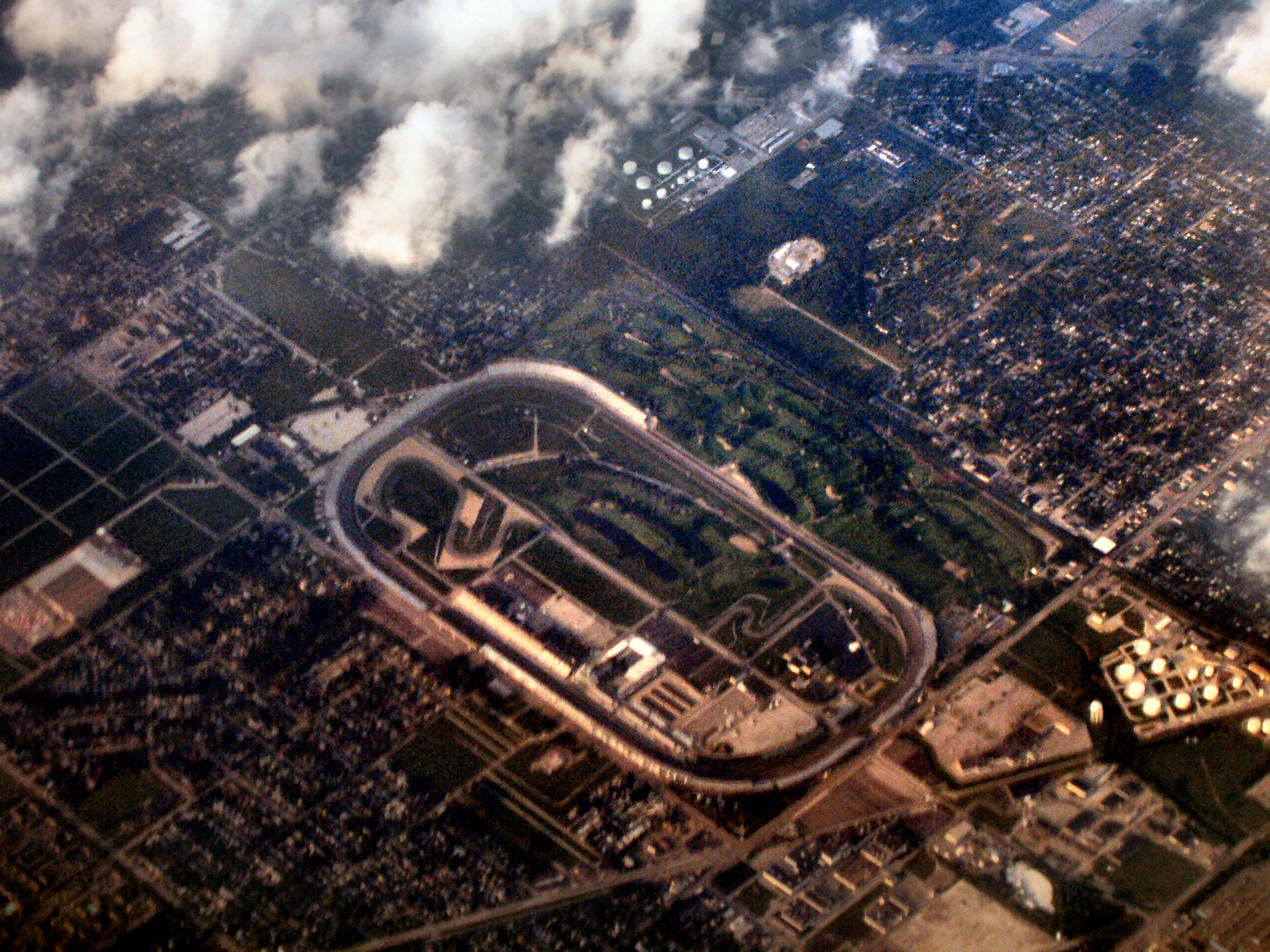
Indianapolis Motor Speedway, the track where the race was held.

The Indianapolis Motor Speedway, located in Speedway, Indiana, (an enclave suburb of Indianapolis) in the United States, is the home of the Indianapolis 500 and the Brickyard 400. It is located on the corner of 16th Street and Georgetown Road, approximately six miles (10 km) west of Downtown Indianapolis.

Constructed in 1909, it is the original speedway, the first racing facility so named. It has a permanent seating capacity estimated at 235,000 with infield seating raising capacity to an approximate 400,000. It is the highest-capacity sports venue in the world.

Considered relatively flat by American standards, the track is a 2.5-mile (4.0 km), nearly rectangular oval with dimensions that have remained essentially unchanged since its inception: four 0.25-mile (0.40 km) turns, two 0.625-mile long (1.006 km) straightaways between the fourth and first turns and the second and third turns, and two .125-mile (0.201 km) short straightaways – termed "short chutes" – between the first and second, and third and fourth turns.

After Cup Series driver Matt DiBenedetto tested two configurations of the road course in January 2020, NASCAR decided to use the 14-turn, 2.439-mile configuration that is normally used for the GMR Grand Prix.

The race was held without fans in attendance due to the ongoing COVID-19 pandemic.

=== Entry list ===
- (R) denotes rookie driver.
- (i) denotes driver who is ineligible for series driver points.

No.	Driver	Team	Manufacturer	Sponsor
0	Mike Wallace	JD Motorsports	Chevrolet	Market Scan
1	Michael Annett	JR Motorsports	Chevrolet	Pilot, Flying J Patriotic
02	Brett Moffitt (i)	Our Motorsports	Chevrolet	Fr8Auctions Patriotic
4	Jesse Little (R)	JD Motorsports	Chevrolet	JD Motorsports
5	Matt Mills	B. J. McLeod Motorsports	Chevrolet	Thompson Electric, J. F. Electric
6	B. J. McLeod	JD Motorsports	Chevrolet	JD Motorsports
7	Justin Allgaier	JR Motorsports	Chevrolet	Klondike
07	Jade Buford	SS-Green Light Racing	Chevrolet	Big Machine Distillery Hand Sanitizer, Big Machine Vodka
8	Jeb Burton	JR Motorsports	Chevrolet	LS Tractor
08	Joe Graf Jr. (R)	SS-Green Light Racing	Chevrolet	Bucked Up Energy
9	Noah Gragson	JR Motorsports	Chevrolet	Switch
10	Ross Chastain	Kaulig Racing	Chevrolet	Chevrolet Accessories Patriotic
11	Justin Haley	Kaulig Racing	Chevrolet	Leaf Filter Gutter Protection
13	Timmy Hill (i)	MBM Motorsports	Toyota	RoofClaim.com
15	Jeffrey Earnhardt	JD Motorsports	Chevrolet	FlexFit 110
16	A. J. Allmendinger	Kaulig Racing	Chevrolet	Digital Ally Body Cameras
18	Riley Herbst (R)	Joe Gibbs Racing	Toyota	Monster Energy
19	Brandon Jones	Joe Gibbs Racing	Toyota	Toyota Service Centers "Keep Your Toyota a Toyota"
20	Harrison Burton (R)	Joe Gibbs Racing	Toyota	DEX Imaging
21	Anthony Alfredo	Richard Childress Racing	Chevrolet	Lucas Oil
22	Austin Cindric	Team Penske	Ford	Menards, Richmond Water Heaters
26	Brandon Gdovic	Sam Hunt Racing	Toyota	Windstax Energy
36	Preston Pardus	DGM Racing	Chevrolet	Chinchor Electric Inc., Danus Utilities
39	Ryan Sieg	RSS Racing	Chevrolet	CMRRoofing.com
44	Tommy Joe Martins	Martins Motorsports	Chevrolet	AAN Adjusters
47	Kyle Weatherman	Mike Harmon Racing	Chevrolet	We Stand For The National Anthem #StandForTheFlag
51	Jeremy Clements	Jeremy Clements Racing	Chevrolet	RepairableVehicles.com
52	Kody Vanderwal (R)	Means Racing	Chevrolet	Means Racing
61	Stephen Leicht	Hattori Racing	Toyota	Jani-King
66	Chad Finchum	MBM Motorsports	Toyota	O. C. R Gaz Bar
68	Brandon Brown	Brandonbilt Motorsports	Chevrolet	Brandonbilt Motorsports
74	Bayley Currey (i)	Mike Harmon Racing	Chevrolet	We Stand For The National Anthem #StandForTheFlag
78	Vinnie Miller	B. J. McLeod Motorsports	Chevrolet	Koolbox ICE
90	Alex Labbé	DGM Racing	Chevrolet	LaRue Industrial Snow Blowers, Prolon
92	Josh Williams	DGM Racing	Chevrolet	Alloy Employer Service "Getting back to work!"
93	Myatt Snider (R)	RSS Racing	Chevrolet	Louisiana Hot Sauce Patriotic
98	Chase Briscoe	Stewart-Haas Racing	Ford	HighPoint.com
99	Josh Bilicki	B. J. McLeod Motorsports	Toyota	Insurance King Patriotic
Official entry list

== Practice ==
=== First practice ===
A. J. Allmendinger was the fastest in the first practice session with a time of 90.155 seconds and a speed of 97.392 mph (156.737 km/h).

Pos	No.	Driver	Team	Manufacturer	Time	Speed
1	16	A. J. Allmendinger	Kaulig Racing	Chevrolet	90.155	97.392
2	22	Austin Cindric	Team Penske	Ford	90.703	96.804
3	98	Chase Briscoe	Stewart-Haas Racing	Ford	91.016	96.471
Official first practice results

=== Final practice ===
Austin Cindric was the fastest in the final practice session with a time of 89.733 seconds and a speed of 97.850 mph (157.474 km/h).

Pos	No.	Driver	Team	Manufacturer	Time	Speed
1	22	Austin Cindric	Team Penske	Ford	89.733	97.850
2	16	A. J. Allmendinger	Kaulig Racing	Chevrolet	90.200	97.344
3	11	Justin Haley	Kaulig Racing	Chevrolet	90.751	96.753
Official final practice results

== Qualifying ==
Jeb Burton was awarded the pole for the race as determined by a random draw.

=== Starting Lineup ===
Pos	No	Driver	Team	Manufacturer
1	8	Jeb Burton	JR Motorsports	Chevrolet
2	1	Michael Annett	JR Motorsports	Chevrolet
3	19	Brandon Jones	Joe Gibbs Racing	Toyota
4	39	Ryan Sieg	RSS Racing	Chevrolet
5	7	Justin Allgaier	JR Motorsports	Chevrolet
6	20	Harrison Burton (R)	Joe Gibbs Racing	Toyota
7	21	Anthony Alfredo	Richard Childress Racing	Chevrolet
8	9	Noah Gragson	JR Motorsports	Chevrolet
9	10	Ross Chastain	Kaulig Racing	Chevrolet
10	22	Austin Cindric	Team Penske	Ford
11	11	Justin Haley	Kaulig Racing	Chevrolet
12	98	Chase Briscoe	Stewart-Haas Racing	Ford
13	4	Jesse Little (R)	JD Motorsports	Chevrolet
14	0	Mike Wallace	JD Motorsports	Chevrolet
15	6	B. J. McLeod	JD Motorsports	Chevrolet
16	02	Brett Moffitt (i)	Our Motorsports	Chevrolet
17	07	Jade Buford	SS-Green Light Racing	Chevrolet
18	15	Jeffrey Earnhardt	JD Motorsports	Chevrolet
19	36	Preston Pardus	DGM Racing	Chevrolet
20	92	Josh Williams	DGM Racing	Chevrolet
21	51	Jeremy Clements	Jeremy Clements Racing	Chevrolet
22	90	Alex Labbé	DGM Racing	Chevrolet
23	18	Riley Herbst	Joe Gibbs Racing	Toyota
24	68	Brandon Brown	Brandonbilt Motorsports	Chevrolet
25	44	Tommy Joe Martins	Martins Motorsports	Chevrolet
26	93	Myatt Snider (R)	RSS Racing	Chevrolet
27	47	Kyle Weatherman	Mike Harmon Racing	Chevrolet
28	61	Stephen Leicht	Hattori Racing	Toyota
29	08	Joe Graf Jr. (R)	SS-Green Light Racing	Chevrolet
30	16	A. J. Allmendinger	Kaulig Racing	Chevrolet
31	52	Kody Vanderwal (R)	Means Racing	Chevrolet
32	74	Bayley Currey (i)	Mike Harmon Racing	Chevrolet
33	5	Matt Mills	B. J. McLeod Motorsports	Chevrolet
34	13	Timmy Hill (i)	MBM Motorsports	Toyota
35	78	Vinnie Miller	B. J. McLeod Motorsports	Chevrolet
36	99	Josh Bilicki	B. J. McLeod Motorsports	Toyota
37	66	Chad Finchum	MBM Motorsports	Toyota
38	26	Brandon Gdovic	Sam Hunt Racing	Toyota
Official starting lineup

== Race ==
=== Race results ===
==== Stage Results ====
Stage One

Laps: 20

Pos	No	Driver	Team	Manufacturer	Points
1	22	Austin Cindric	Team Penske	Ford	10
2	7	Justin Allgaier	JR Motorsports	Chevrolet	9
3	11	Justin Haley	Kaulig Racing	Chevrolet	8
4	98	Chase Briscoe	Stewart-Haas Racing	Ford	7
5	19	Brandon Jones	Joe Gibbs Racing	Toyota	6
6	9	Noah Gragson	JR Motorsports	Chevrolet	5
7	10	Ross Chastain	Kaulig Racing	Chevrolet	4
8	20	Harrison Burton (R)	Joe Gibbs Racing	Toyota	3
9	90	Alex Labbé	DGM Racing	Chevrolet	2
10	51	Jeremy Clements	Jeremy Clements Racing	Chevrolet	1

Stage Two

Laps: 20

Pos	No	Driver	Team	Manufacturer	Points
1	98	Chase Briscoe	Stewart-Haas Racing	Ford	10
2	7	Justin Allgaier	JR Motorsports	Chevrolet	9
3	39	Ryan Sieg	RSS Racing	Chevrolet	8
4	11	Justin Haley	Kaulig Racing	Chevrolet	7
5	1	Michael Annett	JR Motorsports	Chevrolet	6
6	68	Brandon Brown	Brandonbilt Motorsports	Chevrolet	5
7	99	Josh Bilicki	B. J. McLeod Motorsports	Toyota	4
8	13	Timmy Hill (i)	MBM Motorsports	Toyota	0
9	20	Harrison Burton (R)	Joe Gibbs Racing	Toyota	2
10	16	A. J. Allmendinger	Kaulig Racing	Chevrolet	1

=== Final Stage Results ===
Laps: 22

Pos	Grid	No	Driver	Team	Manufacturer	Laps	Points	Status
1	12	98	Chase Briscoe	Stewart-Haas Racing	Ford	62	57	Running
2	11	11	Justin Haley	Kaulig Racing	Chevrolet	62	50	Running
3	8	9	Noah Gragson	JR Motorsports	Chevrolet	62	39	Running
4	30	16	A. J. Allmendinger	Kaulig Racing	Chevrolet	62	34	Running
5	10	22	Austin Cindric	Team Penske	Ford	62	42	Running
6	9	10	Ross Chastain	Kaulig Racing	Chevrolet	62	35	Running
7	5	7	Justin Allgaier	JR Motorsports	Chevrolet	62	48	Running
8	22	90	Alex Labbé	DGM Racing	Chevrolet	62	31	Running
9	2	1	Michael Annett	JR Motorsports	Chevrolet	62	34	Running
10	19	36	Preston Pardus	DGM Racing	Chevrolet	62	27	Running
11	24	68	Brandon Brown	Brandonbilt Motorsports	Chevrolet	62	31	Running
12	38	26	Brandon Gdovic	Sam Hunt Racing	Toyota	62	25	Running
13	21	51	Jeremy Clements	Jeremy Clements Racing	Chevrolet	62	25	Running
14	17	07	Jade Buford	SS-Green Light Racing	Chevrolet	62	23	Running
15	27	47	Kyle Weatherman	Mike Harmon Racing	Chevrolet	62	22	Running
16	26	93	Myatt Snider (R)	RSS Racing	Chevrolet	62	21	Running
17	4	39	Ryan Sieg	RSS Racing	Chevrolet	62	28	Running
18	13	4	Jesse Little (R)	JD Motorsports	Chevrolet	62	19	Running
19	34	13	Timmy Hill (i)	MBM Motorsports	Toyota	62	0	Running
20	7	21	Anthony Alfredo	Richard Childress Racing	Chevrolet	62	17	Running
21	28	61	Stephen Leicht	Hattori Racing	Toyota	62	16	Running
22	20	92	Josh Williams	DGM Racing	Chevrolet	62	15	Running
23	36	99	Josh Bilicki	B. J. McLeod Motorsports	Toyota	62	18	Running
24	14	0	Mike Wallace	JD Motorsports	Chevrolet	62	13	Running
25	6	20	Harrison Burton (R)	Joe Gibbs Racing	Toyota	62	17	Running
26	29	08	Joe Graf Jr. (R)	SS-Green Light Racing	Chevrolet	62	11	Running
27	37	66	Chad Finchum	MBM Motorsports	Toyota	62	10	Running
28	31	52	Kody Vanderwal (R)	Means Racing	Chevrolet	61	9	Running
29	15	6	B. J. McLeod	JD Motorsports	Chevrolet	61	8	Running
30	33	5	Matt Mills	JD Motorsports	Chevrolet	61	7	Running
31	1	8	Jeb Burton	JR Motorsports	Chevrolet	60	6	Running
32	35	78	Vinnie Miller	B. J. McLeod Motorsports	Chevrolet	60	5	Running
33	23	18	Riley Herbst (R)	Joe Gibbs Racing	Toyota	57	4	Running
34	32	74	Bayley Currey (i)	Mike Harmon Racing	Chevrolet	54	0	Running
35	25	44	Tommy Joe Martins	Martins Motorsports	Chevrolet	51	2	Axle
36	16	02	Brett Moffitt (i)	Our Motorsports	Chevrolet	44	0	Running
37	3	19	Brandon Jones	Joe Gibbs Racing	Toyota	34	7	Oil Line
38	18	15	Jeffrey Earnhardt	JD Motorsports	Chevrolet	9	1	Chassis
Official race results

=== Race statistics ===
- Lead changes: 12 among 8 different drivers
- Cautions/Laps: 5 for 15
- Red flags: 0
- Time of race: 2 hours, 2 minutes, 48 seconds
- Average speed: 73.885 mph (118.906 km/h)

== Media ==
=== Television ===
The Pennzoil 150 was carried by NBC in the United States. Rick Allen, Jeff Burton, Steve Letarte, and Dale Earnhardt Jr. called the race from Charlotte Motor Speedway. Marty Snider and Kelli Stavast covered pit road at the track, and Rutledge Wood handled the features from IMS. Additionally, Mike Tirico and Dale Jarrett provided updates and analysis from the pagoda at Indianapolis.

NBC
Booth announcers	Pit reporter	Features Reporter
Lap-by-lap: Rick Allen Color-commentator: Jeff Burton Color-commentator: Steve Letarte Color-commentator: Dale Earnhardt Jr.	Marty Snider Kelli Stavast	Rutledge Wood

=== Radio ===
The Indianapolis Motor Speedway Radio Network and the Performance Racing Network jointly co-produced the radio broadcast for the race, which was simulcast on SiriusXM NASCAR Radio and aired on IMS or PRN stations, depending on contractual obligations.

== Standings after the race ==
Drivers' Championship standings

	Pos	Driver	Points
	1	Chase Briscoe	556
	2	Noah Gragson	535 (-21)
	3	Ross Chastain	501 (-55)
	4	Austin Cindric	495 (-61)
1	5	Justin Haley	451 (-105)
1	6	Justin Allgaier	434 (-122)
2	7	Harrison Burton (R)	421 (-135)
	8	Brandon Jones	383 (-173)
	9	Michael Annett	373 (-183)
	10	Ryan Sieg	329 (-227)
	11	Riley Herbst (R)	298 (-258)
2	12	Brandon Brown	285 (-271)
Official driver's standings

- Note: Only the first 12 positions are included for the driver standings.
- . – Driver has clinched a position in the NASCAR playoffs.

Previous race: 2020 Pocono Green 225	NASCAR Xfinity Series; 2020 season	Next race: 2020 Shady Rays 200
