= Mason Massey =

American racing driver (born 1997)

- Massey at All American Speedway in 2026
- Born: William Mason Massey IV; January 24, 1997 (age 29); Douglasville, Georgia, U.S.
- Achievements: Youngest pole winner in the Southern All Star Racing Series (19 Years Old In 2016); 2012 Alabama 200 Winner

NASCAR O'Reilly Auto Parts Series career
- 68 races run over 6 years
- 2025 position: 38th
- Best finish: 28th (2022)
- First race: 2020 Boyd Gaming 300 (Las Vegas)
- Last race: 2025 Focused Health 302 (Las Vegas)
Wins	Top tens	Poles
0	3	0

NASCAR FedEx Freight Truck Series career
- 33 races run over 6 years
- 2026 position: 53rd
- Best finish: 29th (2024)
- First race: 2019 M&M's 200 (Iowa)
- Last race: 2026 Craftsman 200 (Homestead)
Wins	Top tens	Poles
0	0	0

ARCA Menards Series career
- 1 race run over 1 year
- Best finish: 82nd (2026)
- First race: 2026 General Tire 150 (Phoenix)
Wins	Top tens	Poles
0	1	0

ARCA Menards Series East career
- 2 races run over 1 year
- Best finish: 45th (2014)
- First race: 2014 Visit Hampton VA 175 (Langley)
- Last race: 2014 JEGS 150 (Columbus)
Wins	Top tens	Poles
0	0	0

ARCA Menards Series West career
- 13 races run over 1 year
- Best finish: 2nd (2026)
- First race: 2026 Oil Workers 150 presented by the West Coast Stock Car Motorsports Hall of Fame (Bakersfield)
- Last race: 2026 NAPA Auto Parts 150 (Bakersfield)
- First win: 2026 Oil Workers 150 presented by the West Coast Stock Car Motorsports Hall of Fame (Bakersfield)
- Last win: 2026 Portland 112 (Portland)
Wins	Top tens	Poles
2	10	0
- Statistics up to date as of November 6, 2026.

William Mason Massey IV (born January 24, 1997) is an American professional stock car racing driver. He last competed full-time in the ARCA Menards Series West, driving the No. 19 Chevrolet for Bill McAnally Racing, and part-time in the NASCAR Craftsman Truck Series, driving the No. 20 Chevrolet Silverado RST for McAnally–Hilgemann Racing. He has previously competed in the NASCAR Xfinity Series.

Massey has recorded over 200 feature wins, eleven championships, and ten track records across multiple classes.

== Racing career ==
=== K&N Pro Series East ===
Massey competed in two NASCAR K&N Pro Series East races in 2014 for DRIVE Technology.

=== Craftsman Truck Series ===
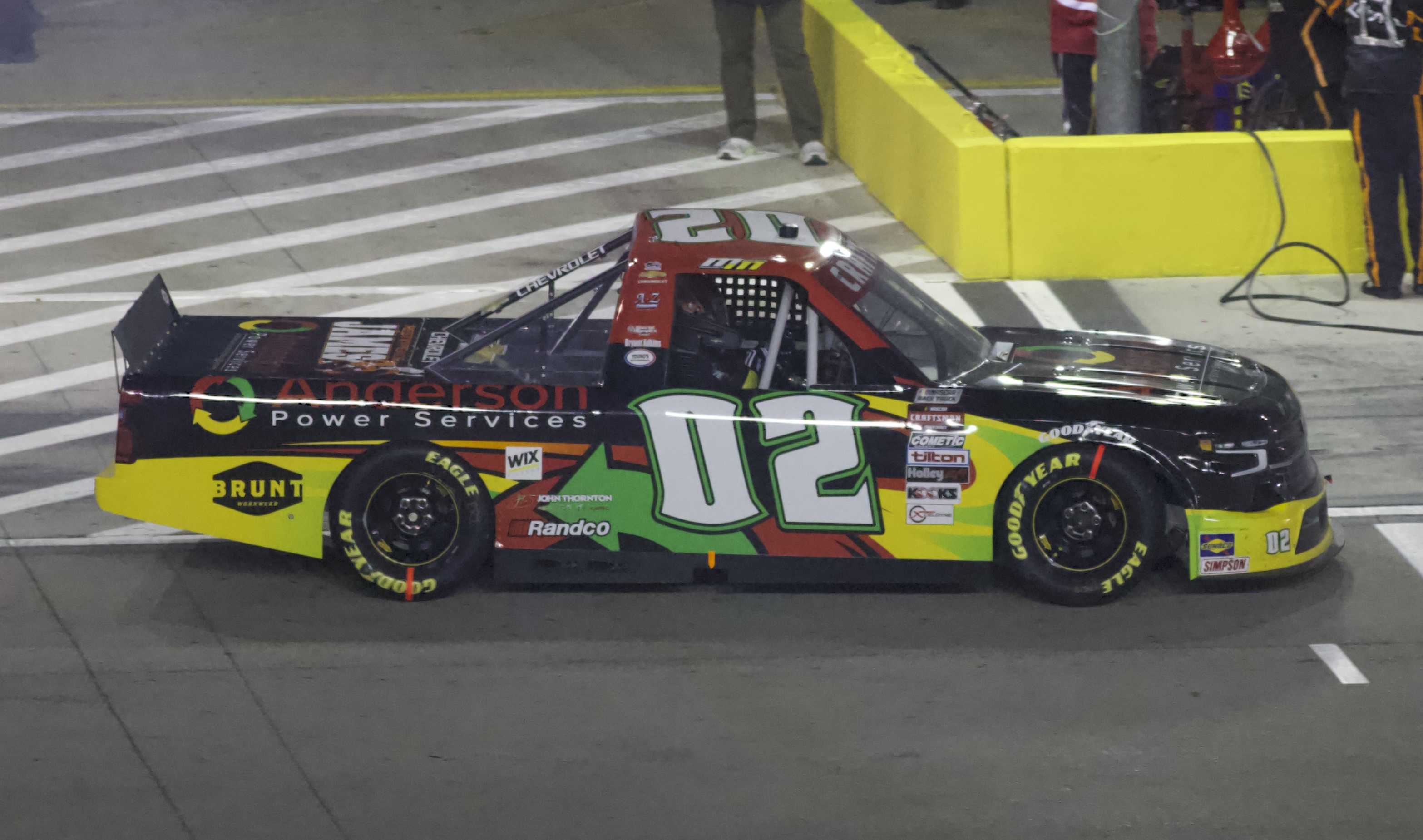
Massey's No. 02 truck at Las Vegas Motor Speedway in 2024

Massey made his NASCAR Gander Outdoors Truck Series debut in the 2019 M&M's 200 at Iowa Speedway. He placed 22nd in the event, and was moved up one position after Ross Chastain's disqualification.

Massey was scheduled to run the full NASCAR Craftsman Truck Series in 2023 for Reaume Brothers Racing in the No. 33 Ford F-150, but left the team seven races into the season. On April 1, 2023, at Texas Motor Speedway in the SpeedyCash.com 250, Massey had his best career Truck Series finish of 11th place.

On February 12, 2024, it was announced that Massey would run full-time in the Truck Series in 2024, driving the No. 02 truck for Young's Motorsports. However, he parted ways with the team after the race at Richmond.

Massey returned to Young's Motorsports in 2025 for the Team EJP 175 at New Hampshire Motor Speedway, finishing 19th.

Massey attempted three races for McAnally–Hilgemann Racing in 2026, finishing 25th at Richmond Raceway and 12th in the season finale at Homestead–Miami Speedway. He failed to qualify at New Hampshire.

=== Xfinity Series ===
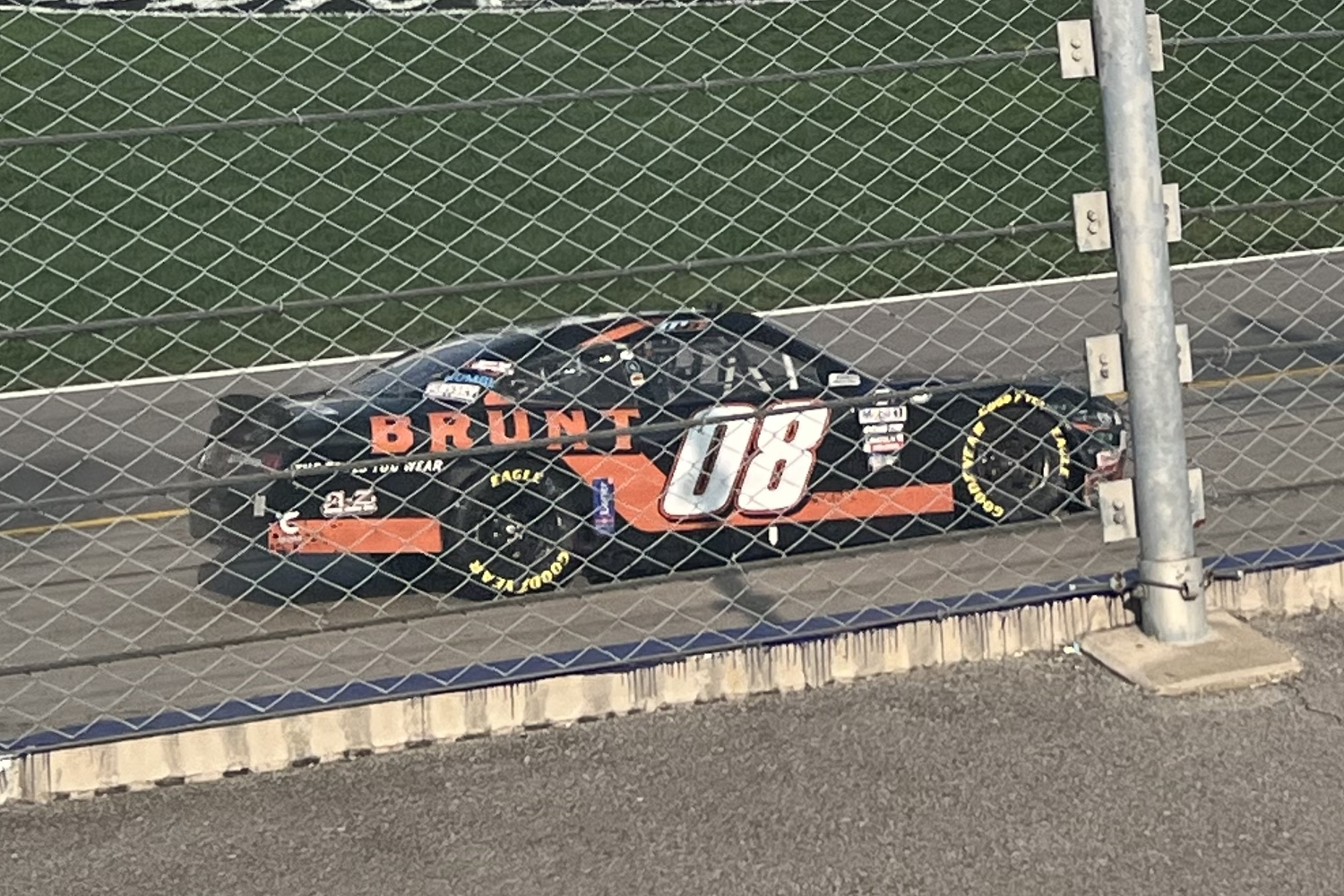
Massey's No. 08 car at Nashville Superspeedway in 2023

On January 28, 2020, it was announced that Massey would drive the No. 99 for B. J. McLeod Motorsports for a portion of the 2020 NASCAR Xfinity Series season, with his first race at Las Vegas Motor Speedway. After the season was over, Massey returned to a track that he raced earlier in his career to win the dirt crate late model feature at Senoia Raceway's Fall Nationals.

Massey rejoined BJMM and the No. 99 on a 12-race schedule in 2021.

In 2022, Massey joined DGM Racing to drive the No. 91 for every oval race. Massey achieved a career-best sixth-place finish at the spring Atlanta race.

In 2023, Massey drove five races for SS-Green Light Racing and DNQ'd once for Alpha Prime Racing.

In 2024, Massey competed in three races in the No. 14 for SS-Green Light Racing, getting a best finish of 11th at Talladega Superspeedway.

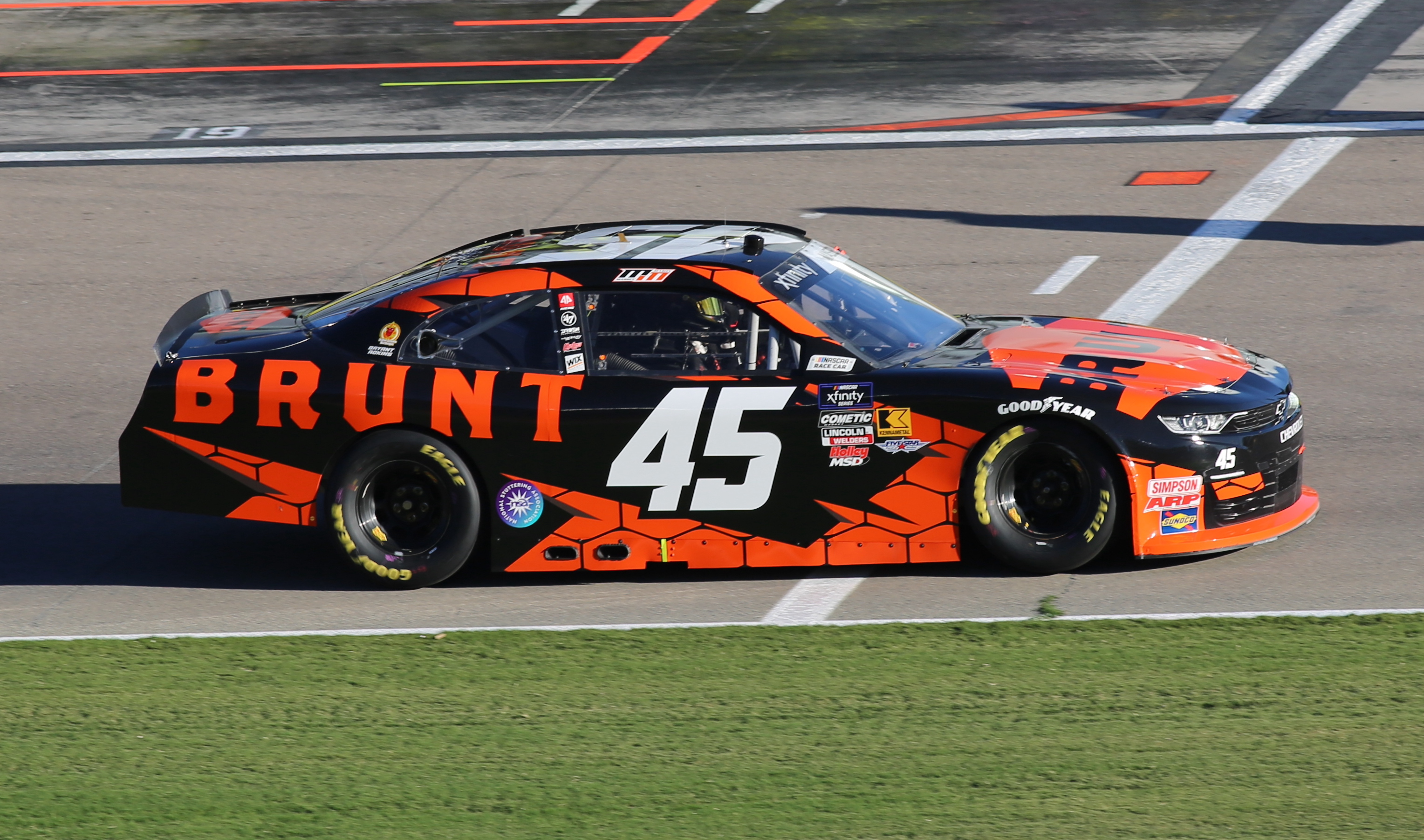
Massey's No. 45 car at Las Vegas Motor Speedway in 2025

In 2025, Massey competed part-time with Alpha Prime Racing in the No. 45 Chevrolet.

=== ARCA Menards Series West ===
Massey's No. 19 car at All American Speedway in 2026

On January 13, 2026, it was announced that Massey will drive full-time in the ARCA Menards Series West, driving the No. 19 Chevrolet for Bill McAnally Racing. He won in his series debut at Kevin Harvick's Kern Raceway and picked up another win at Portland International Raceway after going from fourth to first on the final lap. He ended the season second in the points standings behind Trevor Huddleston.

== Personal life ==
Massey has a stutter, which was the subject of a short film titled "Dust and Dirt", which was showcased at the Sundance Film Festival in 2017.

== Motorsports career results ==
=== Stock car career summary ===
Season	Series	Team	Races	Wins	Top 5	Top 10	Points	Position
2014	NASCAR K&N Pro Series East	DRIVE Technology	2	0	0	0	50	45th
2019	NASCAR Gander Outdoors Truck Series	Reaume Brothers Racing	7	0	0	0	94	37th
2020	NASCAR Xfinity Series	B. J. McLeod Motorsports	10	0	0	0	118	37th
2021	NASCAR Xfinity Series	B. J. McLeod Motorsports	12	0	0	0	116	39th
2021	NASCAR Xfinity Series	SS-Green Light Racing with Rick Ware Racing	1	0	0	0	116	39th
2022	NASCAR Xfinity Series	DGM Racing	24	0	0	2	256	28th
2023	NASCAR Craftsman Truck Series	Reaume Brothers Racing	6	0	0	0	0	NC†
2023	NASCAR Craftsman Truck Series	Young's Motorsports	1	0	0	0	0	NC†
2023	NASCAR Xfinity Series	SS-Green Light Racing	5	0	0	1	76	41st
2023	NASCAR Xfinity Series	Alpha Prime Racing	0	0	0	0	76	41st
2024	NASCAR Craftsman Truck Series	Young's Motorsports	16	0	0	0	209	29th
2024	NASCAR Xfinity Series	SS-Green Light Racing	3	0	0	0	0	NC†
2025	NASCAR Xfinity Series	Alpha Prime Racing	13	0	0	0	129	38th
2026	ARCA Menards Series West	Bill McAnally Racing	13	2	8	10	642	**2nd**
2026	ARCA Menards Series	Bill McAnally Racing	1	0	1	1	39	82nd
2026	NASCAR Craftsman Truck Series	McAnally–Hilgemann Racing	2	0	0	0	37	53rd

^{†} As Massey was a guest driver, he was ineligible for championship points.

=== NASCAR ===
(key) (Bold – Pole position awarded by qualifying time. Italics – Pole position earned by points standings or practice time. * – Most laps led.)

==== Xfinity Series ====
NASCAR Xfinity Series results
Year	Team	No.	Make	1	2	3	4	5	6	7	8	9	10	11	12	13	14	15	16	17	18	19	20	21	22	23	24	25	26	27	28	29	30	31	32	33	NXSC	Pts	Ref
2020	B. J. McLeod Motorsports	99	Toyota	DAY	LVS; 29	CAL	PHO	DAR; 30	CLT; 21	BRI; 30	ATL; 23	HOM	HOM	TAL; 20	POC	IRC	KEN; 28	KEN; 23	TEX	KAN	ROA	DRC	DOV	DOV	DAY	DAR											37th	118	
2020	B. J. McLeod Motorsports	78	Toyota																								RCH; 27	RCH; 21	BRI	LVS	TAL	ROV	KAN	TEX	MAR	PHO	37th	118	
2021	B. J. McLeod Motorsports	99	Toyota	DAY	DRC	HOM	LVS	PHO	ATL; 32	MAR	TAL; 27	DAR	DOV	COA	CLT	MOH	TEX	NSH	POC; 30	ROA	ATL; 29																39th	116	
2021	B. J. McLeod Motorsports	99	Chevy																			NHA; 40	GLN	IRC													39th	116	
2021	B. J. McLeod Motorsports	78	Toyota																						MCH; 30	DAY; 25		RCH; 17	BRI		TAL; 35	ROV					39th	116	
2021	SS-Green Light Racing with Rick Ware Racing	17	Chevy																								DAR; 18										39th	116	
2021	B. J. McLeod Motorsports	78	Chevy																											LVS; 23							39th	116	
2021	B. J. McLeod Motorsports	5	Toyota																														TEX; 27	KAN; 37	MAR	PHO	39th	116	
2022	DGM Racing	91	Chevy	DAY; DNQ	CAL; 28	LVS; 27	PHO; 23	ATL; 6	COA	RCH; 17	MAR; 33	TAL; 37	DOV; 34	DAR; 22	TEX; 18	CLT; DNQ	PIR	NSH; DNQ	ROA	ATL; 24	NHA; 9	POC; 24	IRC	MCH; 24	GLN	DAY; 33	DAR; 20	KAN; 31	BRI; 32	TEX; 32	TAL; 38	ROV	LVS; 29	HOM; 37	MAR; 25	PHO; 33	28th	256	
2023	SS-Green Light Racing	08	Ford	DAY	CAL	LVS	PHO	ATL	COA	RCH	MAR	TAL	DOV	DAR	CLT	PIR	SON	NSH; 32	CSC		NHA; 10	POC	ROA						KAN; 16	BRI	TEX	ROV	LVS	HOM; 27	MAR	PHO	41st	76	
2023	SS-Green Light Racing	08	Chevy																	ATL; 24																	41st	76	
2023	Alpha Prime Racing	44	Chevy																					MCH; DNQ	IRC	GLN	DAY	DAR									41st	76	
2024	SS-Green Light Racing	14	Chevy	DAY	ATL	LVS	PHO	COA	RCH	MAR	TEX	TAL; 11	DOV	DAR	CLT	PIR	SON	IOW	NHA; 30	NSH	CSC																93rd	0^{1}	
2024	SS-Green Light Racing	14	Ford																			POC; 29	IND	MCH	DAY	DAR	ATL	GLN	BRI	KAN	TAL	ROV	LVS	HOM	MAR	PHO	93rd	0^{1}	
2025	Alpha Prime Racing	45	Chevy	DAY	ATL; 28	COA	PHO; 22	LVS; 37	HOM	MAR	DAR; 29	BRI; 25	CAR	TAL	TEX; 21	CLT	NSH; 24	MXC	POC; 20	ATL; 20	CSC	SON	DOV	IND; 24	IOW; 37	GLN	DAY	PIR	GTW	BRI	KAN; 31	ROV	LVS; 37	TAL	MAR	PHO	38th	129	

==== Craftsman Truck Series ====
NASCAR Craftsman Truck Series results
Year	Team	No.	Make	1	2	3	4	5	6	7	8	9	10	11	12	13	14	15	16	17	18	19	20	21	22	23	24	25	NCTC	Pts	Ref
2019	Reaume Brothers Racing	34	Chevy	DAY	ATL	LVS	MAR	TEX	DOV	KAN	CLT	TEX	IOW; 21	GTW				ELD; 23	MCH	BRI	MSP								37th	94	
2019	Reaume Brothers Racing	32	Toyota												CHI; 26														37th	94	
2019	Reaume Brothers Racing	33	Chevy													KEN; 18						LVS; 28	TAL; 32	MAR	PHO	HOM			37th	94	
2019	Reaume Brothers Racing	34	Toyota														POC; 17												37th	94	
2023	Reaume Brothers Racing	33	Ford	DAY; 24	LVS; 27	ATL; 29	COA; DNQ	TEX; 11	BRD; 35	MAR; 33	KAN	DAR	NWS	CLT	GTW	NSH	MOH	POC											99th	0^{1}	
2023	Young's Motorsports	20	Chevy																RCH; 34	IRP	MLW	KAN	BRI	TAL	HOM	PHO			99th	0^{1}	
2024	Young's Motorsports	02	Chevy	DAY; 25	ATL; 20	LVS; 21	BRI; 28	COA; 35	MAR; 11	TEX; 20	KAN; 21	DAR; 15	NWS; 23	CLT; 18	GTW; 31	NSH; 32	POC; 24	IRP; 35	RCH; 26	MLW	BRI	KAN	TAL	HOM	MAR	PHO			29th	207	
2025	Young's Motorsports	20	Chevy	DAY	ATL	LVS	HOM	MAR	BRI	CAR	TEX	KAN	NWS	CLT	NSH	MCH	POC	LRP	IRP	GLN	RCH	DAR	BRI	NHA; 19	ROV	TAL	MAR	PHO	99th	0^{1}	
2026	McAnally–Hilgemann Racing	20	Chevy	DAY	ATL	STP	DAR	CAR	BRI	TEX	GLN	DOV	CLT	NSH	MCH	COR	LRP	NWS	IRP	RCH; 25	NHA; DNQ	BRI	KAN	CLT	PHO	TAL	MAR	HOM; 12	53rd	37	

==== K&N Pro Series East ====
NASCAR K&N Pro Series East results
Year	Team	No.	Make	1	2	3	4	5	6	7	8	9	10	11	12	13	14	15	16	NKNPSEC	Pts	Ref
2014	DRIVE Technology	18	Toyota	NSM	DAY	BRI	GRE	RCH	IOW	BGS	FIF	LGY; 22	NHA	COL; 16	IOW	GLN	VIR	GRE	DOV	45th	50	

=== ARCA Menards Series ===
(key) (Bold – Pole position awarded by qualifying time. Italics – Pole position earned by points standings or practice time. * – Most laps led.)

ARCA Menards Series results
Year	Team	No.	Make	1	2	3	4	5	6	7	8	9	10	11	12	13	14	15	16	17	18	19	20	AMSC	Pts	Ref
2026	Bill McAnally Racing	81	Chevy	DAY	PHO; 5	KAN	TAL	GLN	TOL	MCH	POC	BER	ELK	CHI	LRP	IRP	IOW	ISF	MAD	DSF	SLM	BRI	KAN	82nd	39	

==== ARCA Menards Series West ====
ARCA Menards Series West results
Year	Team	No.	Make	1	2	3	4	5	6	7	8	9	10	11	12	13	AMSWC	Pts	Ref
2026	Bill McAnally Racing	19	Chevy	KER; 1		TUC; 12	SHA; 3	CNS; 4	TRI; 5	SON; 19	PIR; 1	AAS; 17	MAD; 5	LVS; 6	PHO; 3	KER; 9	2nd	642	
2026	Bill McAnally Racing	81	Chevy		PHO; 5												2nd	642	

^{*} Season still in progress
^{1} Ineligible for series points
