= 2021 Buschy McBusch Race 400 =

NASCAR Cup Series race

Race details
- Race 11 of 36 in the 2021 NASCAR Cup Series
- Date: May 2, 2021
- Location: Kansas Speedway in Kansas City, Kansas
- Course: Permanent racing facility
- Course length: 1.5 miles (2.4 km)
- Distance: 267 laps, 400.5 mi (644.542 km)
- Average speed: 129.647 miles per hour (208.647 km/h)

Pole position
Driver	Brad Keselowski	Team Penske
- Grid positions set by competition-based formula

Most laps led
Driver	Kyle Larson	Hendrick Motorsports
- Laps: 132

Winner
No. 18	Kyle Busch	Joe Gibbs Racing

Television in the United States
- Network: FS1
- Announcers: Mike Joy, Jeff Gordon and Clint Bowyer

Radio in the United States
- Radio: MRN
- Booth announcers: Alex Hayden and Jeff Striegle
- Turn announcers: Dave Moody (1 & 2) and Mike Bagley (3 & 4)

The 2021 Buschy McBusch Race 400 was a NASCAR Cup Series race was held on May 2, 2021, at Kansas Speedway in Kansas City, Kansas. Contested over 267 laps, on the 1.5 mile (2.4 km) asphalt speedway, it was the 11th race of the 2021 NASCAR Cup Series season.

== Report ==
=== Background ===
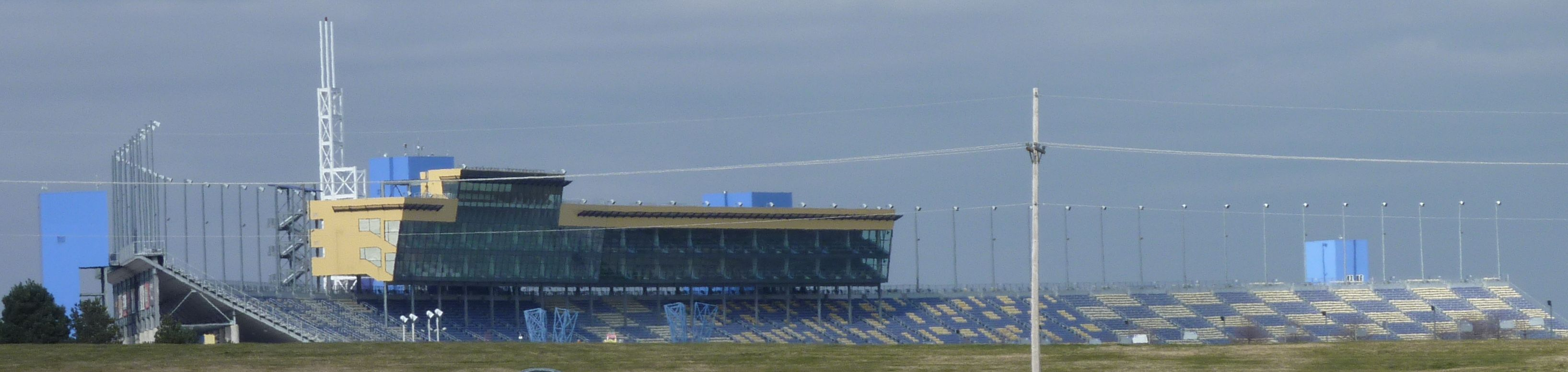
Kansas Speedway, the track where the race was held.

The 2021 Buschy McBusch Race 400 program cover.

Kansas Speedway is a 1.5-mile (2.4 km) tri-oval race track in Kansas City, Kansas. It was built in 2001 and hosts two annual NASCAR race weekends. The NTT IndyCar Series also raced there until 2011. The speedway is owned and operated by the International Speedway Corporation.

==== Sponsor ====
Anheuser-Busch on their @BuschBeer twitter account asked fans to vote on the title sponsor name for the race. The options were between "The Busch Latte 400", "Nectar of the Cobs 400", "For the Farmers 400", and "Buschy McBusch Race 400" with the last one ultimately winning the fan vote.

==== Entry list ====
- (R) denotes rookie driver.
- (i) denotes driver who are ineligible for series driver points.

No.	Driver	Team	Manufacturer
00	Quin Houff	StarCom Racing	Chevrolet
1	Kurt Busch	Chip Ganassi Racing	Chevrolet
2	Brad Keselowski	Team Penske	Ford
3	Austin Dillon	Richard Childress Racing	Chevrolet
4	Kevin Harvick	Stewart-Haas Racing	Ford
5	Kyle Larson	Hendrick Motorsports	Chevrolet
6	Ryan Newman	Roush Fenway Racing	Ford
7	Corey LaJoie	Spire Motorsports	Chevrolet
8	Tyler Reddick	Richard Childress Racing	Chevrolet
9	Chase Elliott	Hendrick Motorsports	Chevrolet
10	Aric Almirola	Stewart-Haas Racing	Ford
11	Denny Hamlin	Joe Gibbs Racing	Toyota
12	Ryan Blaney	Team Penske	Ford
14	Chase Briscoe (R)	Stewart-Haas Racing	Ford
15	Joey Gase (i)	Rick Ware Racing	Chevrolet
17	Chris Buescher	Roush Fenway Racing	Ford
18	Kyle Busch	Joe Gibbs Racing	Toyota
19	Martin Truex Jr.	Joe Gibbs Racing	Toyota
20	Christopher Bell	Joe Gibbs Racing	Toyota
21	Matt DiBenedetto	Wood Brothers Racing	Ford
22	Joey Logano	Team Penske	Ford
23	Bubba Wallace	23XI Racing	Toyota
24	William Byron	Hendrick Motorsports	Chevrolet
33	Austin Cindric (i)	Team Penske	Ford
34	Michael McDowell	Front Row Motorsports	Ford
37	Ryan Preece	JTG Daugherty Racing	Chevrolet
38	Anthony Alfredo (R)	Front Row Motorsports	Ford
41	Cole Custer	Stewart-Haas Racing	Ford
42	Ross Chastain	Chip Ganassi Racing	Chevrolet
43	Erik Jones	Richard Petty Motorsports	Chevrolet
47	Ricky Stenhouse Jr.	JTG Daugherty Racing	Chevrolet
48	Alex Bowman	Hendrick Motorsports	Chevrolet
51	Cody Ware (i)	Petty Ware Racing	Chevrolet
52	Josh Bilicki	Rick Ware Racing	Ford
53	Garrett Smithley (i)	Rick Ware Racing	Ford
55	Matt Mills (i)	B. J. McLeod Motorsports	Ford
77	Justin Haley (i)	Spire Motorsports	Chevrolet
78	B. J. McLeod (i)	Live Fast Motorsports	Ford
99	Daniel Suárez	Trackhouse Racing Team	Chevrolet
Official entry list

== Qualifying ==
Brad Keselowski was awarded the pole for the race as determined by competition-based formula.

=== Starting Lineup ===
Pos	No.	Driver	Team	Manufacturer
1	2	Brad Keselowski	Team Penske	Ford
2	24	William Byron	Hendrick Motorsports	Chevrolet
3	34	Michael McDowell	Front Row Motorsports	Ford
4	4	Kevin Harvick	Stewart-Haas Racing	Ford
5	21	Matt DiBenedetto	Wood Brothers Racing	Ford
6	3	Austin Dillon	Richard Childress Racing	Chevrolet
7	12	Ryan Blaney	Team Penske	Ford
8	20	Christopher Bell	Joe Gibbs Racing	Toyota
9	18	Kyle Busch	Joe Gibbs Racing	Toyota
10	41	Cole Custer	Stewart-Haas Racing	Ford
11	8	Tyler Reddick	Richard Childress Racing	Chevrolet
12	37	Ryan Preece	JTG Daugherty Racing	Chevrolet
13	23	Bubba Wallace	23XI Racing	Toyota
14	6	Ryan Newman	Roush Fenway Racing	Ford
15	19	Martin Truex Jr.	Joe Gibbs Racing	Toyota
16	17	Chris Buescher	Roush Fenway Racing	Ford
17	9	Chase Elliott	Hendrick Motorsports	Chevrolet
18	10	Aric Almirola	Stewart-Haas Racing	Ford
19	14	Chase Briscoe (R)	Stewart-Haas Racing	Ford
20	11	Denny Hamlin	Joe Gibbs Racing	Toyota
21	99	Daniel Suárez	Trackhouse Racing Team	Chevrolet
22	38	Anthony Alfredo (R)	Front Row Motorsports	Ford
23	47	Ricky Stenhouse Jr.	JTG Daugherty Racing	Chevrolet
24	42	Ross Chastain	Chip Ganassi Racing	Chevrolet
25	48	Alex Bowman	Hendrick Motorsports	Chevrolet
26	7	Corey LaJoie	Spire Motorsports	Chevrolet
27	43	Erik Jones	Richard Petty Motorsports	Chevrolet
28	1	Kurt Busch	Chip Ganassi Racing	Chevrolet
29	22	Joey Logano	Team Penske	Ford
30	78	B. J. McLeod (i)	Live Fast Motorsports	Ford
31	77	Justin Haley (i)	Spire Motorsports	Chevrolet
32	5	Kyle Larson	Hendrick Motorsports	Chevrolet
33	51	Cody Ware (i)	Petty Ware Racing	Chevrolet
34	00	Quin Houff	StarCom Racing	Chevrolet
35	15	Joey Gase (i)	Rick Ware Racing	Chevrolet
36	53	Garrett Smithley (i)	Rick Ware Racing	Ford
37	52	Josh Bilicki	Rick Ware Racing	Ford
38	33	Austin Cindric (i)	Team Penske	Ford
39	55	Matt Mills (i)	B. J. McLeod Motorsports	Ford
Official starting lineup

== Race ==
=== Stage Results ===
Stage One Laps: 80

Pos	No	Driver	Team	Manufacturer	Points
1	18	Kyle Busch	Joe Gibbs Racing	Toyota	10
2	5	Kyle Larson	Hendrick Motorsports	Chevrolet	9
3	8	Tyler Reddick	Richard Childress Racing	Chevrolet	8
4	2	Brad Keselowski	Team Penske	Ford	7
5	24	William Byron	Hendrick Motorsports	Chevrolet	6
6	9	Chase Elliott	Hendrick Motorsports	Chevrolet	5
7	4	Kevin Harvick	Stewart-Haas Racing	Ford	4
8	12	Ryan Blaney	Team Penske	Ford	3
9	11	Denny Hamlin	Joe Gibbs Racing	Toyota	2
10	20	Christopher Bell	Joe Gibbs Racing	Toyota	1
Official stage one results

Stage Two Laps: 80

Pos	No	Driver	Team	Manufacturer	Points
1	5	Kyle Larson	Hendrick Motorsports	Chevrolet	10
2	18	Kyle Busch	Joe Gibbs Racing	Toyota	9
3	11	Denny Hamlin	Joe Gibbs Racing	Toyota	8
4	2	Brad Keselowski	Team Penske	Ford	7
5	9	Chase Elliott	Hendrick Motorsports	Chevrolet	6
6	12	Ryan Blaney	Team Penske	Ford	5
7	19	Martin Truex Jr.	Joe Gibbs Racing	Toyota	4
8	8	Tyler Reddick	Richard Childress Racing	Chevrolet	3
9	20	Christopher Bell	Joe Gibbs Racing	Toyota	2
10	4	Kevin Harvick	Stewart-Haas Racing	Ford	1
Official stage two results

=== Final Stage Results ===
Stage Three Laps: 107

Pos	Grid	No	Driver	Team	Manufacturer	Laps	Points
1	9	18	Kyle Busch	Joe Gibbs Racing	Toyota	267	59
2	4	4	Kevin Harvick	Stewart-Haas Racing	Ford	267	40
3	1	2	Brad Keselowski	Team Penske	Ford	267	48
4	5	21	Matt DiBenedetto	Wood Brothers Racing	Ford	267	33
5	17	9	Chase Elliott	Hendrick Motorsports	Chevrolet	267	43
6	15	19	Martin Truex Jr.	Joe Gibbs Racing	Toyota	267	35
7	11	8	Tyler Reddick	Richard Childress Racing	Chevrolet	267	41
8	16	17	Chris Buescher	Roush Fenway Racing	Ford	267	29
9	2	24	William Byron	Hendrick Motorsports	Chevrolet	267	34
10	6	3	Austin Dillon	Richard Childress Racing	Chevrolet	267	27
11	21	99	Daniel Suárez	Trackhouse Racing Team	Chevrolet	267	26
12	20	11	Denny Hamlin	Joe Gibbs Racing	Toyota	267	35
13	3	34	Michael McDowell	Front Row Motorsports	Ford	267	24
14	24	42	Ross Chastain	Chip Ganassi Racing	Chevrolet	267	23
15	28	1	Kurt Busch	Chip Ganassi Racing	Chevrolet	267	22
16	14	6	Ryan Newman	Roush Fenway Racing	Ford	267	21
17	29	22	Joey Logano	Team Penske	Ford	267	20
18	25	48	Alex Bowman	Hendrick Motorsports	Chevrolet	267	19
19	32	5	Kyle Larson	Hendrick Motorsports	Chevrolet	267	37
20	19	14	Chase Briscoe (R)	Stewart-Haas Racing	Ford	267	17
21	7	12	Ryan Blaney	Team Penske	Ford	267	24
22	38	33	Austin Cindric (i)	Team Penske	Ford	267	0
23	22	38	Anthony Alfredo (R)	Front Row Motorsports	Ford	266	14
24	10	41	Cole Custer	Stewart-Haas Racing	Ford	266	13
25	27	43	Erik Jones	Richard Petty Motorsports	Chevrolet	266	12
26	13	23	Bubba Wallace	23XI Racing	Toyota	266	11
27	26	7	Corey LaJoie	Spire Motorsports	Chevrolet	265	10
28	8	20	Christopher Bell	Joe Gibbs Racing	Toyota	265	12
29	18	10	Aric Almirola	Stewart-Haas Racing	Ford	264	8
30	31	77	Justin Haley (i)	Spire Motorsports	Chevrolet	263	0
31	30	78	B. J. McLeod (i)	Live Fast Motorsports	Ford	260	0
32	12	37	Ryan Preece	JTG Daugherty Racing	Chevrolet	259	5
33	36	53	Garrett Smithley (i)	Rick Ware Racing	Chevrolet	259	0
34	23	47	Ricky Stenhouse Jr.	JTG Daugherty Racing	Chevrolet	258	3
35	35	15	Joey Gase (i)	Rick Ware Racing	Chevrolet	258	0
36	33	51	Cody Ware (i)	Petty Ware Racing	Chevrolet	257	0
37	34	00	Quin Houff	StarCom Racing	Chevrolet	256	1
38	39	55	Matt Mills (i)	B. J. McLeod Motorsports	Ford	255	0
39	37	52	Josh Bilicki	Rick Ware Racing	Ford	250	1
Official race results

=== Race statistics ===
- Lead changes: 18 among 6 different drivers
- Cautions/Laps: 7 for 36
- Red flags: 0
- Time of race: 3 hours, 5 minutes and 21 seconds
- Average speed: 129.647 miles per hour (208.647 km/h)

== Media ==
=== Television ===
Fox Sports covered their 10th race at the Kansas Speedway. Mike Joy, three-time Kansas winner Jeff Gordon and Clint Bowyer called the race from the broadcast booth. Jamie Little and Regan Smith handled pit road for the television side. Larry McReynolds provided insight from the Fox Sports studio in Charlotte.

FS1
Booth announcers	Pit reporters	In-race analyst
Lap-by-lap: Mike Joy; Color-commentator: Jeff Gordon; Color-commentator: Clint Bowyer	Jamie Little; Regan Smith	Larry McReynolds

=== Radio ===
MRN had the radio call for the race which was also simulcast on Sirius XM NASCAR Radio. Alex Hayden and Jeff Striegle called the race in the booth when the field raced through the tri-oval. Dave Moody covered the race from the Sunoco spotters stand outside turn 2 when the field was racing through turns 1 and 2. Mike Bagley called the race from a platform outside turn 4. Steve Post and Pete Pistone worked pit road for the radio side.

MRN Radio
Booth announcers	Turn announcers	Pit reporters
Lead announcer: Alex Hayden; Announcer: Jeff Striegle	Turns 1 & 2: Dave Moody; Turns 3 & 4: Mike Bagley	Steve Post; Pete Pistone

== Standings after the race ==
Drivers' Championship standings

	Pos	Driver	Points
	1	Denny Hamlin	481
	2	Martin Truex Jr.	394 (–87)
1	3	William Byron	385 (–96)
1	4	Joey Logano	373 (–108)
	5	Ryan Blaney	370 (–111)
	6	Brad Keselowski	366 (–115)
1	7	Chase Elliott	349 (–132)
1	8	Kevin Harvick	348 (–133)
	9	Kyle Larson	337 (–144)
1	10	Kyle Busch	330 (–151)
1	11	Austin Dillon	295 (–186)
2	12	Christopher Bell	292 (–189)
	13	Michael McDowell	268 (–213)
	14	Alex Bowman	260 (–221)
1	15	Chris Buescher	258 (–223)
1	16	Matt DiBenedetto	250 (–231)
Official driver's standings

Manufacturers' Championship standings

Pos	Manufacturer	Points
1	Ford	397
2	Chevrolet	392 (–5)
3	Toyota	382 (–15)

- Note: Only the first 16 positions are included for the driver standings.
- . – Driver has clinched a position in the NASCAR Cup Series playoffs.

Previous race: 2021 GEICO 500	NASCAR Cup Series; 2021 season	Next race: 2021 Goodyear 400
