= 2022 Ag-Pro 300 =

Ninth race of the 2022 NASCAR Xfinity Series

Race details
- Race 9 of 33 in the 2022 NASCAR Xfinity Series
- Date: April 23, 2022
- Location: Lincoln, Alabama, Talladega Superspeedway
- Course: Permanent racing facility
- Course length: 2.66 miles (0.847 km)
- Distance: 124 laps, 329.84 mi (530.82 km)
- Scheduled distance: 113 laps, 300.58 mi (483.74 km)
- Average speed: 123.024 mph (197.988 km/h)

Pole position
Driver	Jeffrey Earnhardt	Richard Childress Racing
- Time: 52.454

Most laps led
Driver	Austin Hill	Richard Childress Racing
- Laps: 67

Winner
No. 9	Noah Gragson	JR Motorsports

Television in the United States
- Network: Fox
- Announcers: Adam Alexander, Kurt Busch, Austin Dillon

Radio in the United States
- Radio: Motor Racing Network

The 2022 Ag-Pro 300 was the ninth stock car race of the 2022 NASCAR Xfinity Series, the 31st iteration of the event, and the third race of the Dash 4 Cash. The race was held on Saturday, April 23, 2022, in Lincoln, Alabama at Talladega Superspeedway, a 2.66 mile (4.28 km) permanent triangle-shaped superspeedway. The Dash 4 Cash in this race is consisted of Brandon Jones, Landon Cassill, A. J. Allmendinger, and Austin Hill, since they were the highest finishing Xfinity regulars after Martinsville Speedway. The race was extended from 113 laps to 124 laps, due to three NASCAR overtime attempts. At race's end, Noah Gragson of JR Motorsports would grab the win, after being able to take the lead on the final restart. This was Gragson's seventh career Xfinity Series win, and his second of the season. To fill out the podium, Jeffrey Earnhardt of Richard Childress Racing and A. J. Allmendinger of Kaulig Racing would finish 2nd and 3rd, respectively. Allmendinger would win the Dash 4 Cash, after finishing ahead of Cassill, Jones, and Hill.

This was the debut race for Chandler Smith.

== Background ==
Talladega Superspeedway, nicknamed “Dega”, and formerly named Alabama International Motor Speedway (AIMS), is a motorsports complex located north of Talladega, Alabama. It is located on the former Anniston Air Force Base in the small city of Lincoln. A tri-oval, the track was constructed in 1969 by the International Speedway Corporation, a business controlled by the France Family. As of 2021, the track hosts the NASCAR Cup Series, NASCAR Xfinity Series, NASCAR Camping World Truck Series, and ARCA Menards Series. Talladega is the longest NASCAR oval, with a length of 2.66 miles (4.281 km), compared to the Daytona International Speedway, which is 2.5 miles (4.0 km) long. The total peak capacity of Talladega is around 175,000 spectators, with the main grandstand capacity being about 80,000.

=== Entry list ===
- (R) denotes rookie driver.
- (i) denotes driver who is ineligible for series driver points.

#	Driver	Team	Make
1	Sam Mayer	JR Motorsports	Chevrolet
02	Brett Moffitt	Our Motorsports	Chevrolet
2	Sheldon Creed (R)	Richard Childress Racing	Chevrolet
3	Jeffrey Earnhardt	Richard Childress Racing	Chevrolet
4	Bayley Currey	JD Motorsports	Chevrolet
5	Matt Mills	B. J. McLeod Motorsports	Chevrolet
6	Ryan Vargas	JD Motorsports	Chevrolet
07	Joe Graf Jr.	SS-Green Light Racing	Ford
7	Justin Allgaier	JR Motorsports	Chevrolet
08	David Starr	SS-Green Light Racing	Ford
8	Josh Berry	JR Motorsports	Chevrolet
9	Noah Gragson	JR Motorsports	Chevrolet
10	Landon Cassill	Kaulig Racing	Chevrolet
11	Daniel Hemric	Kaulig Racing	Chevrolet
13	Natalie Decker	MBM Motorsports	Ford
16	A. J. Allmendinger	Kaulig Racing	Chevrolet
18	Drew Dollar	Joe Gibbs Racing	Toyota
19	Brandon Jones	Joe Gibbs Racing	Toyota
21	Austin Hill (R)	Richard Childress Racing	Chevrolet
23	Anthony Alfredo	Our Motorsports	Chevrolet
26	Chandler Smith (i)	Sam Hunt Racing	Toyota
27	Jeb Burton	Our Motorsports	Chevrolet
28	C. J. McLaughlin	RSS Racing	Ford
31	Myatt Snider	Jordan Anderson Racing	Chevrolet
34	Jesse Iwuji (R)	Jesse Iwuji Motorsports	Chevrolet
35	Joey Gase	Emerling-Gase Motorsports	Ford
36	Alex Labbé	DGM Racing	Chevrolet
38	Ryan Sieg	RSS Racing	Ford
39	Kyle Sieg	RSS Racing	Ford
44	Ryan Ellis	Alpha Prime Racing	Chevrolet
45	Caesar Bacarella	Alpha Prime Racing	Chevrolet
47	Gray Gaulding	Mike Harmon Racing	Chevrolet
48	Kaz Grala (i)	Big Machine Racing	Chevrolet
51	Jeremy Clements	Jeremy Clements Racing	Chevrolet
53	Shane Lee	Emerling-Gase Motorsports	Ford
54	Ty Gibbs	Joe Gibbs Racing	Toyota
66	J. J. Yeley	MBM Motorsports	Chevrolet
68	Brandon Brown	Brandonbilt Motorsports	Chevrolet
78	Josh Williams	B. J. McLeod Motorsports	Chevrolet
91	Mason Massey	DGM Racing	Chevrolet
98	Riley Herbst	Stewart-Haas Racing	Ford
Official entry list

== Qualifying ==
Qualifying was held on Friday, April 22, at 4:30 PM CST. Since Talladega Superspeedway is a superspeedway, the qualifying system used is a single-car, one-lap system with two rounds. In the first round, drivers have one lap to set a time. The fastest ten drivers from the first round move on to the second round. Whoever sets the fastest time in Round 2 wins the pole.

Jeffrey Earnhardt, driving the iconic No. 3 for Richard Childress Racing, scored the pole for the race with a time of 52.454 seconds and a speed of 182.560 mph (293.802 km/h). It was Earnhardt's first career pole in NASCAR, along with his first at Talladega. It was also the first pole for Larry McReynolds as a crew chief since 2000.

=== Full qualifying results ===
Pos.	#	Driver	Team	Make	Time (R1)	Speed (R1)	Time (R2)	Speed (R2)
1	3	Jeffrey Earnhardt	Richard Childress Racing	Chevrolet	52.604	182.039	52.454	182.560
2	21	Austin Hill (R)	Richard Childress Racing	Chevrolet	52.591	182.084	52.514	182.351
3	54	Ty Gibbs	Joe Gibbs Racing	Toyota	52.567	182.168	52.551	182.223
4	2	Sheldon Creed (R)	Richard Childress Racing	Chevrolet	52.684	181.763	52.589	182.091
5	11	Daniel Hemric	Kaulig Racing	Chevrolet	52.754	181.522	52.699	181.711
6	10	Landon Cassill	Kaulig Racing	Chevrolet	52.797	181.374	52.709	181.677
7	6	Ryan Vargas	JD Motorsports	Chevrolet	52.737	181.580	52.713	181.663
8	48	Kaz Grala (i)	Big Machine Racing	Chevrolet	52.799	181.367	52.798	181.371
9	18	Drew Dollar	Joe Gibbs Racing	Toyota	52.810	181.329	52.807	181.340
10	38	Ryan Sieg	RSS Racing	Ford	52.777	181.443	52.993	180.703
Eliminated in Round 1
11	7	Justin Allgaier	JR Motorsports	Chevrolet	52.912	180.980	—	—
12	23	Anthony Alfredo	Our Motorsports	Chevrolet	52.912	180.980	—	—
13	16	A. J. Allmendinger	Kaulig Racing	Chevrolet	52.957	180.826	—	—
14	1	Sam Mayer	JR Motorsports	Chevrolet	52.979	180.751	—	—
15	19	Brandon Jones	Joe Gibbs Racing	Toyota	52.988	180.720	—	—
16	8	Josh Berry	JR Motorsports	Chevrolet	52.994	180.700	—	—
17	68	Brandon Brown	Brandonbilt Motorsports	Chevrolet	53.001	180.676	—	—
18	02	Brett Moffitt	Our Motorsports	Chevrolet	53.003	180.669	—	—
19	9	Noah Gragson	JR Motorsports	Chevrolet	53.087	180.383	—	—
20	98	Riley Herbst	Stewart-Haas Racing	Ford	53.125	180.254	—	—
21	36	Alex Labbé	DGM Racing	Chevrolet	53.137	180.213	—	—
22	27	Jeb Burton	Our Motorsports	Chevrolet	53.193	180.024	—	—
23	45	Caesar Bacarella	Alpha Prime Racing	Chevrolet	53.212	179.959	—	—
24	07	Joe Graf Jr.	SS-Green Light Racing	Ford	53.242	179.858	—	—
25	91	Mason Massey	DGM Racing	Chevrolet	53.258	179.804	—	—
26	78	Josh Williams	B. J. McLeod Motorsports	Chevrolet	53.301	179.659	—	—
27	5	Matt Mills	B. J. McLeod Motorsports	Chevrolet	53.364	179.447	—	—
28	66	J. J. Yeley	MBM Motorsports	Chevrolet	53.483	179.048	—	—
29	4	Bayley Currey	JD Motorsports	Chevrolet	53.496	179.004	—	—
30	26	Chandler Smith (i)	Sam Hunt Racing	Toyota	53.527	178.900	—	—
31	31	Myatt Snider	Jordan Anderson Racing	Chevrolet	53.628	178.563	—	—
32	53	Shane Lee	Emerling-Gase Motorsports	Ford	53.630	178.557	—	—
33	47	Gray Gaulding	Mike Harmon Racing	Chevrolet	53.641	178.520	—	—
Qualified by owner's points
34	51	Jeremy Clements	Jeremy Clements Racing	Chevrolet	53.691	178.354	—	—
35	08	David Starr	SS-Green Light Racing	Ford	53.727	178.234	—	—
36	35	Joey Gase	Emerling-Gase Motorsports	Ford	52.727	178.234	—	—
37	39	Kyle Sieg	RSS Racing	Ford	53.749	178.161	—	—
38	44	Ryan Ellis	Alpha Prime Racing	Chevrolet	53.765	178.108	—	—
Failed to qualify
39	13	Natalie Decker	MBM Motorsports	Ford	53.695	178.341	—	—
40	34	Jesse Iwuji (R)	Jesse Iwuji Motorsports	Chevrolet	53.701	178.321	—	—
41	28	C. J. McLaughlin	RSS Racing	Ford	61.818	154.906	—	—
Official qualifying results
Official starting lineup

== Race results ==
Stage 1 Laps: 25

Pos.	#	Driver	Team	Make	Pts
1	8	Josh Berry	JR Motorsports	Chevrolet	10
2	54	Ty Gibbs	Joe Gibbs Racing	Toyota	9
3	16	A. J. Allmendinger	Kaulig Racing	Chevrolet	8
4	10	Landon Cassill	Kaulig Racing	Chevrolet	7
5	21	Austin Hill (R)	Richard Childress Racing	Chevrolet	6
6	7	Justin Allgaier	JR Motorsports	Chevrolet	5
7	9	Noah Gragson	JR Motorsports	Chevrolet	4
8	23	Anthony Alfredo	Our Motorsports	Chevrolet	3
9	1	Sam Mayer	JR Motorsports	Chevrolet	2
10	02	Brett Moffitt	Our Motorsports	Chevrolet	1

Stage 2 Laps: 25

Pos.	#	Driver	Team	Make	Pts
1	7	Justin Allgaier	JR Motorsports	Chevrolet	10
2	1	Sam Mayer	JR Motorsports	Chevrolet	9
3	21	Austin Hill (R)	Richard Childress Racing	Chevrolet	8
4	19	Brandon Jones	Joe Gibbs Racing	Toyota	7
5	54	Ty Gibbs	Joe Gibbs Racing	Toyota	6
6	18	Drew Dollar	Joe Gibbs Racing	Toyota	5
7	68	Brandon Brown	Brandonbilt Motorsports	Chevrolet	4
8	3	Jeffrey Earnhardt	Richard Childress Racing	Chevrolet	3
9	31	Myatt Snider	Jordan Anderson Racing	Chevrolet	2
10	27	Jeb Burton	Our Motorsports	Chevrolet	1

Stage 3 Laps: 74

Fin.	St	#	Driver	Team	Make	Laps	Led	Status	Points
1	19	9	Noah Gragson	JR Motorsports	Chevrolet	124	7	Running	44
2	1	3	Jeffrey Earnhardt	Richard Childress Racing	Chevrolet	124	10	Running	38
3	13	16	A. J. Allmendinger	Kaulig Racing	Chevrolet	124	6	Running	42
4	10	38	Ryan Sieg	RSS Racing	Ford	124	0	Running	33
5	6	10	Landon Cassill	Kaulig Racing	Chevrolet	124	0	Running	39
6	12	23	Anthony Alfredo	Our Motorsports	Chevrolet	124	3	Running	34
7	20	98	Riley Herbst	Stewart-Haas Racing	Ford	124	0	Running	30
8	24	07	Joe Graf Jr.	SS-Green Light Racing	Ford	124	0	Running	29
9	31	31	Myatt Snider	Jordan Anderson Racing	Chevrolet	124	0	Running	30
10	18	02	Brett Moffitt	Our Motorsports	Chevrolet	124	0	Running	28
11	16	8	Josh Berry	JR Motorsports	Chevrolet	124	5	Running	36
12	21	36	Alex Labbé	DGM Racing	Chevrolet	124	0	Running	25
13	9	18	Drew Dollar	Joe Gibbs Racing	Toyota	124	1	Running	29
14	32	53	Shane Lee	Emerling-Gase Motorsports	Ford	124	0	Running	23
15	22	27	Jeb Burton	Our Motorsports	Chevrolet	124	0	Running	23
16	36	35	Joey Gase	Emerling-Gase Motorsports	Ford	124	0	Running	21
17	29	4	Bayley Currey	JD Motorsports	Chevrolet	124	0	Running	20
18	37	39	Kyle Sieg	RSS Racing	Ford	124	0	Running	19
19	26	78	Josh Williams	B. J. McLeod Motorsports	Chevrolet	124	0	Running	18
20	7	6	Ryan Vargas	JD Motorsports	Chevrolet	124	0	Running	17
21	33	47	Gray Gaulding	Mike Harmon Racing	Chevrolet	123	0	Running	16
22	11	7	Justin Allgaier	JR Motorsports	Chevrolet	122	13	Fuel Pressure	30
23	34	51	Jeremy Clements	Jeremy Clements Racing	Chevrolet	122	0	Running	14
24	4	2	Sheldon Creed (R)	Richard Childress Racing	Chevrolet	113	1	Accident	13
25	23	45	Caesar Bacarella	Alpha Prime Racing	Chevrolet	113	0	Accident	12
26	15	19	Brandon Jones	Joe Gibbs Racing	Toyota	110	0	DVP	18
27	2	21	Austin Hill (R)	Richard Childress Racing	Chevrolet	110	67	Accident	24
28	14	1	Sam Mayer	JR Motorsports	Chevrolet	109	2	Accident	20
29	8	48	Kaz Grala (i)	Big Machine Racing	Chevrolet	103	0	Accident	0
30	17	68	Brandon Brown	Brandonbilt Motorsports	Chevrolet	103	1	Accident	11
31	27	5	Matt Mills	B. J. McLeod Motorsports	Chevrolet	96	0	Accident	6
32	38	44	Ryan Ellis	Alpha Prime Racing	Chevrolet	84	0	DVP	5
33	35	08	David Starr	SS-Green Light Racing	Ford	83	1	DVP	4
34	5	11	Daniel Hemric	Kaulig Racing	Chevrolet	79	0	DVP	3
35	3	54	Ty Gibbs	Joe Gibbs Racing	Toyota	76	5	Accident	17
36	28	66	J. J. Yeley	MBM Motorsports	Chevrolet	51	2	DVP	1
37	25	91	Mason Massey	DGM Racing	Chevrolet	47	0	Accident	1
38	30	26	Chandler Smith (i)	Sam Hunt Racing	Toyota	47	0	Accident	0
Official race results

== Standings after the race ==
Drivers' Championship standings

Pos	Driver	Points
1	A. J. Allmendinger	384
2	Noah Gragson	344 (-40)
3	Ty Gibbs	339 (-45)
4	Josh Berry	284 (-100)
5	Brandon Jones	271 (-113)
6	Justin Allgaier	263 (-121)
7	Ryan Sieg	260 (-124)
8	Sam Mayer	255 (-129)
9	Austin Hill	250 (-134)
10	Riley Herbst	242 (-142)
11	Landon Cassill	240 (-144)
12	Daniel Hemric	230 (-154)
Official driver's standings

- Note: Only the first 12 positions are included for the driver standings.

Previous race: 2022 Call 811 Before You Dig 250	NASCAR Xfinity Series; 2022 season	Next race: 2022 A-GAME 200
