= 2022 Call 811 Before You Dig 250 =

Seventh race of the 2022 NASCAR Xfinity Series

Race details
- Race 8 of 33 in the 2022 NASCAR Xfinity Series
- Date: April 8, 2022
- Official name: 15th Annual Call 811 Before You Dig 250
- Location: Ridgeway, Virginia, Martinsville Speedway
- Course: Permanent racing facility
- Course length: 0.526 miles (0.847 km)
- Distance: 261 laps, 137.2 mi (221 km)
- Scheduled distance: 250 laps, 131.2 mi (211.1 km)
- Average speed: 56.099 mph (90.283 km/h)

Pole position
Driver	Ty Gibbs	Joe Gibbs Racing
- Time: 19.728

Most laps led
Driver	Ty Gibbs	Joe Gibbs Racing
- Laps: 197

Winner
No. 19	Brandon Jones	Joe Gibbs Racing

Television in the United States
- Network: Fox Sports 1
- Announcers: Adam Alexander, Austin Dillon, Erik Jones

Radio in the United States
- Radio: Motor Racing Network

The 2022 Call 811 Before You Dig 250 powered by Call811.com was the eighth stock car race of the 2022 NASCAR Xfinity Series, the 15th iteration of the event, and the second race of the Dash 4 Cash. The race was held on Friday, April 8, 2022, in Ridgeway, Virginia at Martinsville Speedway, a 0.526 mile (0.847 km) permanent paperclip-shaped short track. The Dash 4 Cash in this race was consisted of Ty Gibbs, A. J. Allmendinger, Riley Herbst, and Sam Mayer, since they were the highest finishing Xfinity regulars after Richmond Raceway. The race was extended from 250 laps to 261 laps, due to several NASCAR overtime restarts. Brandon Jones of Joe Gibbs Racing would win the race, after moving his teammate, Ty Gibbs, on the final restart. This was Jones' fifth career Xfinity Series win, and his first since 2020. To fill out the podium, Landon Cassill and A. J. Allmendinger of Kaulig Racing would finish 2nd and 3rd, respectively. Allmendinger was also able to win the Dash 4 Cash after finishing ahead of Gibbs, Herbst, and Mayer.

A post-race fight occurred after the race, between Ty Gibbs and Sam Mayer. On the last lap, Gibbs and Jones were battling for the lead, when Mayer and Landon Cassill both attempted to go around Gibbs on the inside line, and resulted with a three wide situation. Mayer's car would get loose, causing him to move up the racetrack, and putting Gibbs into the outside wall. Mayer and Gibbs would end up finishing 5th and 8th, respectively.

== Background ==
Martinsville Speedway is a NASCAR-owned stock car racing track located in Henry County, in Ridgeway, Virginia, just to the south of Martinsville. At 0.526 miles (0.847 km) in length, it is the shortest track in the NASCAR Cup Series. The track was also one of the first paved oval tracks in NASCAR, being built in 1947 by H. Clay Earles. It is also the only remaining race track that has been on the NASCAR circuit from its beginning in 1948.

=== Entry list ===
- (R) denotes rookie driver.
- (i) denotes driver who is ineligible for series driver points.

#	Driver	Team	Make
1	Sam Mayer	JR Motorsports	Chevrolet
02	Brett Moffitt	Our Motorsports	Chevrolet
2	Sheldon Creed (R)	Richard Childress Racing	Chevrolet
4	Bayley Currey	JD Motorsports	Chevrolet
5	Matt Mills	B. J. McLeod Motorsports	Chevrolet
6	Ryan Vargas	JD Motorsports	Chevrolet
07	Joe Graf Jr.	SS-Green Light Racing	Ford
7	Justin Allgaier	JR Motorsports	Chevrolet
08	David Starr	SS-Green Light Racing	Ford
8	Josh Berry	JR Motorsports	Chevrolet
9	Noah Gragson	JR Motorsports	Chevrolet
10	Landon Cassill	Kaulig Racing	Chevrolet
11	Daniel Hemric	Kaulig Racing	Chevrolet
13	Chad Finchum	MBM Motorsports	Toyota
16	A. J. Allmendinger	Kaulig Racing	Chevrolet
18	Ryan Truex	Joe Gibbs Racing	Toyota
19	Brandon Jones	Joe Gibbs Racing	Toyota
21	Austin Hill (R)	Richard Childress Racing	Chevrolet
23	Anthony Alfredo	Our Motorsports	Chevrolet
26	Derek Griffith	Sam Hunt Racing	Toyota
27	Jeb Burton	Our Motorsports	Chevrolet
28	Natalie Decker	RSS Racing	Ford
31	Myatt Snider	Jordan Anderson Racing	Chevrolet
34	Kyle Weatherman	Jesse Iwuji Motorsports	Chevrolet
35	Shane Lee	Emerling-Gase Motorsports	Ford
36	Alex Labbé	DGM Racing	Chevrolet
38	Parker Retzlaff	RSS Racing	Ford
39	Ryan Sieg	RSS Racing	Ford
44	Howie DiSavino III	Alpha Prime Racing	Chevrolet
45	Ryan Ellis	Alpha Prime Racing	Chevrolet
47	Brennan Poole	Mike Harmon Racing	Chevrolet
48	Jade Buford	Big Machine Racing	Chevrolet
51	Jeremy Clements	Jeremy Clements Racing	Chevrolet
52	Harrison Rhodes	Jimmy Means Racing	Chevrolet
54	Ty Gibbs	Joe Gibbs Racing	Toyota
66	J. J. Yeley	MBM Motorsports	Toyota
68	Brandon Brown	Brandonbilt Motorsports	Chevrolet
77	Ronnie Bassett Jr.	Bassett Racing	Chevrolet
78	Josh Williams	B. J. McLeod Motorsports	Chevrolet
88	Dale Earnhardt Jr.	JR Motorsports	Chevrolet
91	Mason Massey	DGM Racing	Chevrolet
98	Riley Herbst	Stewart-Haas Racing	Ford
99	Stefan Parsons	B. J. McLeod Motorsports	Chevrolet
Official entry list

== Practice ==
The only 30-minute practice session was held on Thursday, April 7, at 5:30 PM EST. Sheldon Creed of Richard Childress Racing would set the fastest in the session, with a time of 20.360 seconds and a speed of 93.006 mph (149.679 km/h).

Pos.	#	Driver	Team	Make	Time	Speed
1	2	Sheldon Creed (R)	Richard Childress Racing	Chevrolet	20.360	93.006
2	54	Ty Gibbs	Joe Gibbs Racing	Toyota	20.366	92.978
3	11	Daniel Hemric	Kaulig Racing	Chevrolet	20.393	92.855
Full practice results

== Qualifying ==
Qualifying was held on Thursday, April 7, at 6:00 PM EST. Since Martinsville Speedway is a short track, the qualifying system used is a single-car, two-lap system with only one round. Whoever sets the fastest time in the round wins the pole.

Ty Gibbs of Joe Gibbs Racing scored the pole for the race, with a time of 19.728 seconds and a speed of 95.985 mph (154.473 km/h).

=== Full qualifying results ===
Pos.	#	Driver	Team	Make	Time	Speed
1	54	Ty Gibbs	Joe Gibbs Racing	Toyota	19.728	95.985
2	7	Justin Allgaier	JR Motorsports	Chevrolet	19.829	95.496
3	9	Noah Gragson	JR Motorsports	Chevrolet	19.860	95.347
4	18	Ryan Truex	Joe Gibbs Racing	Toyota	19.924	95.041
5	2	Sheldon Creed (R)	Richard Childress Racing	Chevrolet	19.937	94.979
6	02	Brett Moffitt	Our Motorsports	Chevrolet	19.950	94.917
7	10	Landon Cassill	Kaulig Racing	Chevrolet	19.962	94.860
8	39	Ryan Sieg	RSS Racing	Ford	19.990	94.727
9	11	Daniel Hemric	Kaulig Racing	Chevrolet	20.009	94.637
10	8	Josh Berry	JR Motorsports	Chevrolet	20.035	94.515
11	98	Riley Herbst	Stewart-Haas Racing	Ford	20.074	94.331
12	19	Brandon Jones	Joe Gibbs Racing	Toyota	20.077	94.317
13	16	A. J. Allmendinger	Kaulig Racing	Chevrolet	20.086	94.275
14	21	Austin Hill (R)	Richard Childress Racing	Chevrolet	20.105	94.186
15	51	Jeremy Clements	Jeremy Clements Racing	Chevrolet	20.107	94.176
16	23	Anthony Alfredo	Our Motorsports	Chevrolet	20.131	94.064
17	68	Brandon Brown	Brandonbilt Motorsports	Chevrolet	20.145	93.999
18	36	Alex Labbé	DGM Racing	Chevrolet	20.149	93.980
19	31	Myatt Snider	Jordan Anderson Racing	Chevrolet	20.155	93.952
20	38	Parker Retzlaff	RSS Racing	Ford	20.159	93.933
21	1	Sam Mayer	JR Motorsports	Chevrolet	20.162	93.919
22	44	Howie DiSavino III	Alpha Prime Racing	Chevrolet	20.195	93.766
23	99	Stefan Parsons	B. J. McLeod Motorsports	Chevrolet	20.280	93.373
24	07	Joe Graf Jr.	SS-Green Light Racing	Ford	20.308	93.244
25	27	Jeb Burton	Our Motorsports	Chevrolet	20.332	93.134
26	91	Mason Massey	DGM Racing	Chevrolet	20.357	93.020
27	34	Kyle Weatherman	Jesse Iwuji Motorsports	Chevrolet	20.363	92.992
28	35	Shane Lee	Emerling-Gase Motorsports	Ford	20.392	92.860
29	4	Bayley Currey	JD Motorsports	Chevrolet	20.398	92.833
30	88	Dale Earnhardt Jr.	JR Motorsports	Chevrolet	20.407	92.792
31	48	Jade Buford	Big Machine Racing	Chevrolet	20.409	92.783
32	47	Brennan Poole	Mike Harmon Racing	Chevrolet	20.420	92.733
33	66	J. J. Yeley	MBM Motorsports	Toyota	20.444	92.624
Qualified by owner's points
34	6	Ryan Vargas	JD Motorsports	Chevrolet	20.451	92.592
35	08	David Starr	SS-Green Light Racing	Ford	20.479	92.465
36	26	Derek Griffith	Sam Hunt Racing	Toyota	20.568	92.065
37	5	Matt Mills	B. J. McLeod Motorsports	Chevrolet	20.694	91.505
38	28	Natalie Decker	RSS Racing	Ford	20.987	90.227
Failed to qualify
39	45	Ryan Ellis	Alpha Prime Racing	Chevrolet	20.506	92.344
40	77	Ronnie Bassett Jr.	Bassett Racing	Chevrolet	20.633	91.775
41	13	Chad Finchum	MBM Motorsports	Toyota	20.771	91.116
42	78	Josh Williams	B. J. McLeod Motorsports	Chevrolet	20.821	90.947
43	52	Harrison Rhodes	Jimmy Means Racing	Chevrolet	21.297	88.914
Official qualifying results
Official starting lineup

== Post race conflict ==
After the race, Ty Gibbs and Sam Mayer got into a fistfight on pit road. On the last lap after getting passed by Brandon Jones, Gibbs was looking for a good finish when he got bumped by Sam Mayer and then Mayer shoved Gibbs up the racetrack in turn 4 after Mayer made contact with Landon Cassill. Mayer finished 5th while Gibbs finished 8th. After they took the checkered flag, Gibbs ran into Mayer's rear bumper a few times as a show of displeasure. On pit road, the two drivers got out of their cars and tried to talk with their helmets on. Gibbs then shoved Mayer as Mayer was taking his helmet off but Gibbs chose to keep his on. Upset with that, Mayer took Gibbs' visor and pushed it up as if he wants him to take his helmet off but Gibbs refused. After a shove by Mayer, Gibbs threw 3 punches at Mayer and the two got into a scuffle on pit road. Both drivers were eventually separated. Gibbs was eventually fined $15,000 for hitting Mayer's car after the race.

== Race results ==
Stage 1 Laps: 60

Pos.	#	Driver	Team	Make	Pts
1	54	Ty Gibbs	Joe Gibbs Racing	Toyota	10
2	7	Justin Allgaier	JR Motorsports	Chevrolet	9
3	18	Ryan Truex	Joe Gibbs Racing	Toyota	8
4	10	Landon Cassill	Kaulig Racing	Chevrolet	7
5	11	Daniel Hemric	Kaulig Racing	Chevrolet	6
6	16	A. J. Allmendinger	Kaulig Racing	Chevrolet	5
7	19	Brandon Jones	Joe Gibbs Racing	Toyota	4
8	8	Josh Berry	JR Motorsports	Chevrolet	3
9	1	Sam Mayer	JR Motorsports	Chevrolet	2
10	2	Sheldon Creed (R)	Richard Childress Racing	Chevrolet	1

Stage 2 Laps: 60

Pos.	#	Driver	Team	Make	Pts
1	19	Brandon Jones	Joe Gibbs Racing	Toyota	10
2	10	Landon Cassill	Kaulig Racing	Chevrolet	9
3	39	Ryan Sieg	RSS Racing	Ford	8
4	68	Brandon Brown	Brandonbilt Motorsports	Chevrolet	7
5	08	David Starr	SS-Green Light Racing	Ford	6
6	23	Anthony Alfredo	Our Motorsports	Chevrolet	5
7	99	Stefan Parsons	B. J. McLeod Motorsports	Chevrolet	4
8	51	Jeremy Clements	Jeremy Clements Racing	Chevrolet	3
9	98	Riley Herbst	Stewart-Haas Racing	Ford	2
10	35	Shane Lee	Emerling-Gase Motorsports	Ford	1

Stage 3 Laps: 100

Fin.	St	#	Driver	Team	Make	Laps	Led	Status	Points
1	12	19	Brandon Jones	Joe Gibbs Racing	Toyota	261	28	Running	54
2	7	10	Landon Cassill	Kaulig Racing	Chevrolet	261	0	Running	51
3	13	16	A. J. Allmendinger	Kaulig Racing	Chevrolet	261	0	Running	39
4	14	21	Austin Hill (R)	Richard Childress Racing	Chevrolet	261	0	Running	33
5	21	1	Sam Mayer	JR Motorsports	Chevrolet	261	0	Running	34
6	11	98	Riley Herbst	Stewart-Haas Racing	Ford	261	1	Running	33
7	4	18	Ryan Truex	Joe Gibbs Racing	Toyota	261	0	Running	38
8	1	54	Ty Gibbs	Joe Gibbs Racing	Toyota	261	197	Running	39
9	8	39	Ryan Sieg	RSS Racing	Ford	261	0	Running	36
10	15	51	Jeremy Clements	Jeremy Clements Racing	Chevrolet	261	0	Running	30
11	30	88	Dale Earnhardt Jr.	JR Motorsports	Chevrolet	261	0	Running	26
12	20	38	Parker Retzlaff	RSS Racing	Ford	261	0	Running	25
13	9	11	Daniel Hemric	Kaulig Racing	Chevrolet	261	0	Running	30
14	16	23	Anthony Alfredo	Our Motorsports	Chevrolet	261	0	Running	28
15	18	36	Alex Labbé	DGM Racing	Chevrolet	261	0	Running	22
16	27	34	Kyle Weatherman	Jesse Iwuji Motorsports	Chevrolet	261	0	Running	21
17	29	4	Bayley Currey	JD Motorsports	Chevrolet	261	0	Running	20
18	37	5	Matt Mills	B. J. McLeod Motorsports	Chevrolet	261	0	Running	19
19	10	8	Josh Berry	JR Motorsports	Chevrolet	261	0	Running	21
20	3	9	Noah Gragson	JR Motorsports	Chevrolet	261	23	Running	17
21	36	26	Derek Griffith	Sam Hunt Racing	Toyota	261	0	Running	16
22	31	48	Jade Buford	Big Machine Racing	Chevrolet	260	0	Running	15
23	35	08	David Starr	SS-Green Light Racing	Ford	260	0	Running	20
24	19	31	Myatt Snider	Jordan Anderson Racing	Chevrolet	260	0	Running	13
25	34	6	Ryan Vargas	JD Motorsports	Chevrolet	260	0	Running	12
26	24	07	Joe Graf Jr.	SS-Green Light Racing	Ford	260	0	Running	11
27	28	35	Shane Lee	Emerling-Gase Motorsports	Ford	260	0	Running	11
28	23	99	Stefan Parsons	B. J. McLeod Motorsports	Chevrolet	260	5	Running	13
29	2	7	Justin Allgaier	JR Motorsports	Chevrolet	260	1	Running	17
30	5	2	Sheldon Creed (R)	Richard Childress Racing	Chevrolet	259	6	Running	8
31	33	66	J. J. Yeley	MBM Motorsports	Toyota	259	0	Running	6
32	25	27	Jeb Burton	Our Motorsports	Chevrolet	255	0	Accident	5
33	26	91	Mason Massey	DGM Racing	Chevrolet	255	0	DVP	4
34	17	68	Brandon Brown	Brandonbilt Motorsports	Chevrolet	250	0	Accident	10
35	38	28	Natalie Decker	RSS Racing	Ford	242	0	Running	2
36	22	44	Howie DiSavino III	Alpha Prime Racing	Chevrolet	37	0	Driveshaft	1
37	6	02	Brett Moffitt	Our Motorsports	Chevrolet	13	0	Driveshaft	1
38	32	47	Brennan Poole	Mike Harmon Racing	Chevrolet	0	0	Clutch	1
Official race results

== Standings after the race ==
Drivers' Championship standings

Pos	Driver	Points
1	A. J. Allmendinger	342
2	Ty Gibbs	322 (-20)
3	Noah Gragson	300 (-42)
4	Brandon Jones	253 (-89)
5	Josh Berry	248 (-94)
6	Sam Mayer	235 (-107)
7	Justin Allgaier	233 (-109)
8	Daniel Hemric	227 (-115)
9	Ryan Sieg	227 (-115)
10	Austin Hill	226 (-116)
11	Riley Herbst	212 (-130)
12	Landon Cassill	201 (-141)
Official driver's standings

- Note: Only the first 12 positions are included for the driver standings.

Previous race: 2022 ToyotaCare 250	NASCAR Xfinity Series; 2022 season	Next race: 2022 Ag-Pro 300
