= 2022 Beef. It's What's for Dinner. 300 =

First race of the 2022 NASCAR Xfinity Series

Race details
- Race 1 of 33 in the 2022 NASCAR Xfinity Series
- Date: February 19, 2022
- Official name: 41st Annual Beef. It's What's for Dinner. 300
- Location: Daytona Beach, Florida, Daytona International Speedway
- Course: Permanent racing facility
- Course length: 2.5 miles (4.0 km)
- Distance: 120 laps, 300 mi (482.803 km)
- Scheduled distance: 120 laps, 300 mi (482.803 km)
- Average speed: 136.605 miles per hour (219.844 km/h)

Pole position
Driver	Daniel Hemric	Kaulig Racing
- Time: 49.221

Most laps led
Driver	Daniel Hemric	Kaulig Racing
- Laps: 38

Winner
No. 21	Austin Hill	Richard Childress Racing

Television in the United States
- Network: Fox Sports 1
- Announcers: Adam Alexander, Denny Hamlin, Chad Knaus

Radio in the United States
- Radio: Motor Racing Network

The 2022 Beef. It's What's for Dinner. 300 was the first stock car race of the 2022 NASCAR Xfinity Series and the 41st iteration of the event. The race was held on Saturday, February 19, 2022, in Daytona Beach, Florida at Daytona International Speedway, a 2.5 miles (4.0 km) permanent triangular-shaped superspeedway. The race was run over 120 laps. In a wild ending, Austin Hill, driving for Richard Childress Racing, would win the race under caution, with a major wreck including Jordan Anderson Racing driver Myatt Snider flipping and hitting the catchfence with others involved spinning and hitting parts of Snider's wrecked car. Snider would eventually walk away, unharmed from the incident. The win was Hill's first career NASCAR Xfinity Series win and his first of the season. To fill out the podium, A. J. Allmendinger of Kaulig Racing and Noah Gragson of JR Motorsports would finish second and third, respectively.

== Background ==
Daytona International Speedway is one of three superspeedways to hold NASCAR races, the other two being Indianapolis Motor Speedway and Talladega Superspeedway. The standard track at Daytona International Speedway is a four-turn superspeedway that is 2.5 miles (4.0 km) long. The track's turns are banked at 31 degrees, while the front stretch, the location of the finish line, is banked at 18 degrees.

=== Entry list ===
#	Driver	Team	Make
1	Sam Mayer	JR Motorsports	Chevrolet
02	Brett Moffitt	Our Motorsports	Chevrolet
2	Sheldon Creed (R)	Richard Childress Racing	Chevrolet
4	Bayley Currey	JD Motorsports	Chevrolet
5	Matt Mills	B. J. McLeod Motorsports	Chevrolet
6	Ryan Vargas	JD Motorsports	Chevrolet
07	Joe Graf Jr.	SS-Green Light Racing	Ford
7	Justin Allgaier	JR Motorsports	Chevrolet
8	Josh Berry	JR Motorsports	Chevrolet
08	David Starr	SS-Green Light Racing	Ford
9	Noah Gragson	JR Motorsports	Chevrolet
10	Landon Cassill	Kaulig Racing	Chevrolet
11	Daniel Hemric	Kaulig Racing	Chevrolet
16	A. J. Allmendinger	Kaulig Racing	Chevrolet
18	Drew Dollar	Joe Gibbs Racing	Toyota
19	Brandon Jones	Joe Gibbs Racing	Toyota
21	Austin Hill (R)	Richard Childress Racing	Chevrolet
23	Anthony Alfredo	Our Motorsports	Chevrolet
24	Jeffrey Earnhardt	Sam Hunt Racing	Toyota
26	Ryan Truex	Sam Hunt Racing	Toyota
27	Jeb Burton	Our Motorsports	Chevrolet
28	Kyle Sieg	RSS Racing	Ford
31	Myatt Snider	Jordan Anderson Racing	Chevrolet
33	Natalie Decker	Reaume Brothers Racing	Toyota
34	Jesse Iwuji (R)	Jesse Iwuji Motorsports	Chevrolet
35	Shane Lee	Emerling-Gase Motorsports	Toyota
36	Josh Bilicki	DGM Racing	Chevrolet
38	C. J. McLaughlin	RSS Racing	Ford
39	Ryan Sieg	RSS Racing	Ford
44	Tommy Joe Martins	Alpha Prime Racing	Chevrolet
45	Caesar Bacarella	Alpha Prime Racing	Chevrolet
47	Gray Gaulding	Mike Harmon Racing	Chevrolet
48	Jade Buford	Big Machine Racing	Chevrolet
51	Jeremy Clements	Jeremy Clements Racing	Chevrolet
52	Harrison Rhodes	Jimmy Means Racing	Chevrolet
53	Joey Gase	Emerling-Gase Motorsports	Ford
54	Ty Gibbs	Joe Gibbs Racing	Toyota
66	J. J. Yeley	MBM Motorsports	Chevrolet
68	Brandon Brown	Brandonbilt Motorsports	Chevrolet
74	Tim Viens (i)	Mike Harmon Racing	Chevrolet
77	Ronnie Bassett Jr.	Bassett Racing	Chevrolet
78	Josh Williams	B. J. McLeod Motorsports	Chevrolet
90	Alex Labbé	DGM Racing	Chevrolet
91	Mason Massey	DGM Racing	Chevrolet
92	Kyle Weatherman	DGM Racing	Chevrolet
98	Riley Herbst	Stewart-Haas Racing	Ford
99	Stefan Parsons	B. J. McLeod Motorsports	Chevrolet
Official entry list

== Practice ==
The only 50-minute practice session was held on Friday, February 18, at 4:35 PM EST. Ty Gibbs of Joe Gibbs Racing would set the fastest time in the session, with a time of 48.117 seconds and a speed of 187.044 mph (301.018 km/h).

Pos.	#	Driver	Team	Make	Time	Speed
1	54	Ty Gibbs	Joe Gibbs Racing	Toyota	48.220	186.645
2	19	Brandon Jones	Joe Gibbs Racing	Toyota	48.226	186.621
3	18	Drew Dollar	Joe Gibbs Racing	Toyota	48.238	186.575
Full practice results

== Qualifying ==
Qualifying was held on Saturday, February 19, at 11:35 AM EST. Since Daytona International Speedway is a superspeedway, the qualifying system used is a single-car, single-lap system with two rounds. In the first round, drivers have one lap to set a time. The fastest ten drivers from the first round move on to the second round. Whoever sets the fastest time in Round 2 wins the pole.

Daniel Hemric scored the pole for the race with a time of 49.221 seconds with a speed of 182.849 mph (294.267 km/h).

Pos.	#	Driver	Team	Make	Time (R1)	Speed (R1)	Time (R2)	Speed (R2)
1	11	Daniel Hemric	Kaulig Racing	Chevrolet	49.301	182.552	49.221	182.849
2	21	Austin Hill (R)	Richard Childress Racing	Chevrolet	49.551	181.631	49.336	182.423
3	48	Jade Buford	Big Machine Racing	Chevrolet	49.372	182.290	49.355	182.352
4	2	Sheldon Creed (R)	Richard Childress Racing	Chevrolet	49.486	181.870	49.451	181.998
5	02	Brett Moffitt	Our Motorsports	Chevrolet	49.490	181.855	49.548	181.642
6	8	Josh Berry	JR Motorsports	Chevrolet	49.702	181.079	49.552	181.627
7	10	Landon Cassill	Kaulig Racing	Chevrolet	49.702	181.079	49.552	181.627
8	6	Ryan Vargas	JD Motorsports	Chevrolet	49.410	182.149	49.580	181.525
9	19	Brandon Jones	Joe Gibbs Racing	Toyota	49.638	181.313	49.591	181.485
10	98	Riley Herbst	Stewart-Haas Racing	Ford	49.706	181.065	49.657	181.243
Eliminated in Round 1
11	16	A. J. Allmendinger	Kaulig Racing	Chevrolet	49.712	181.043	—	—
12	18	Drew Dollar	Joe Gibbs Racing	Toyota	49.745	180.923	—	—
13	68	Brandon Brown	Brandonbilt Motorsports	Chevrolet	49.790	180.759	—	—
14	9	Noah Gragson	JR Motorsports	Chevrolet	49.808	180.694	—	—
15	54	Ty Gibbs	Joe Gibbs Racing	Toyota	49.812	180.679	—	—
16	23	Anthony Alfredo	Our Motorsports	Chevrolet	49.821	180.647	—	—
17	7	Justin Allgaier	JR Motorsports	Chevrolet	49.825	180.632	—	—
18	5	Matt Mills	B. J. McLeod Motorsports	Chevrolet	49.863	180.495	—	—
19	39	Ryan Sieg	RSS Racing	Ford	49.883	180.422	—	—
20	24	Jeffrey Earnhardt	Sam Hunt Racing	Toyota	49.960	180.144	—	—
21	66	J. J. Yeley	MBM Motorsports	Chevrolet	49.974	180.094	—	—
22	45	Caesar Bacarella	Alpha Prime Racing	Chevrolet	49.985	180.054	—	—
23	92	Kyle Weatherman	DGM Racing	Chevrolet	49.988	180.043	—	—
24	78	Josh Williams	DGM Racing	Chevrolet	50.005	179.982	—	—
25	4	Bayley Currey	JD Motorsports	Chevrolet	50.008	179.971	—	—
26	38	C. J. McLaughlin	RSS Racing	Ford	50.083	179.702	—	—
27	27	Jeb Burton	Our Motorsports	Chevrolet	50.083	179.702	—	—
28	53	Joey Gase	Emerling-Gase Motorsports	Ford	50.091	179.673	—	—
29	07	Joe Graf Jr.	SS-Green Light Racing	Ford	50.095	179.659	—	—
30	34	Jesse Iwuji (R)	Jesse Iwuji Motorsports	Chevrolet	50.122	179.562	—	—
31	36	Josh Bilicki	DGM Racing	Chevrolet	50.137	179.508	—	—
32	44	Tommy Joe Martins	Alpha Prime Racing	Chevrolet	50.213	179.236	—	—
33	31	Myatt Snider	Jordan Anderson Racing	Chevrolet	50.221	179.208	—	—
Qualified by owner's points
34	1	Sam Mayer	JR Motorsports	Chevrolet	50.249	179.108	—	—
35	51	Jeremy Clements	Jeremy Clements Racing	Chevrolet	50.317	178.866	—	—
36	28	Kyle Sieg	RSS Racing	Ford	50.476	178.303	—	—
37	35	Shane Lee	Emerling-Gase Motorsports	Toyota	50.845	177.009	—	—
38	26	Ryan Truex	Sam Hunt Racing	Toyota	50.966	176.588	—	—
Failed to qualify
39	08	David Starr	SS-Green Light Racing	Ford	50.267	179.044	—	—
40	90	Alex Labbé	DGM Racing	Chevrolet	50.286	178.976	—	—
41	99	Stefan Parsons	B. J. McLeod Motorsports	Chevrolet	50.394	178.593	—	—
42	91	Mason Massey	DGM Racing	Chevrolet	50.400	178.571	—	—
43	33	Natalie Decker	Reaume Brothers Racing	Toyota	50.474	178.310	—	—
44	47	Gray Gaulding	Mike Harmon Racing	Chevrolet	50.858	176.963	—	—
45	77	Ronnie Bassett Jr.	Bassett Racing	Chevrolet	51.190	175.816	—	—
46	52	Harrison Rhodes	Jimmy Means Racing	Chevrolet	51.927	173.320	—	—
47	74	Tim Viens	Mike Harmon Racing	Chevrolet	52.172	172.506	—	—
Official qualifying results
Official starting lineup

== Race results ==
Stage 1 Laps: 30

Pos.	#	Driver	Team	Make	Pts
1	11	Daniel Hemric	Kaulig Racing	Chevrolet	10
2	16	A. J. Allmendinger	Kaulig Racing	Chevrolet	9
3	98	Riley Herbst	Stewart-Haas Racing	Ford	8
4	21	Austin Hill (R)	Richard Childress Racing	Chevrolet	7
5	9	Noah Gragson	JR Motorsports	Chevrolet	6
6	54	Ty Gibbs	Joe Gibbs Racing	Toyota	5
7	7	Justin Allgaier	JR Motorsports	Chevrolet	4
8	39	Ryan Sieg	RSS Racing	Ford	3
9	68	Brandon Brown	Brandonbilt Motorsports	Chevrolet	2
10	1	Sam Mayer	JR Motorsports	Chevrolet	1

Stage 2 Laps: 30

Pos.	#	Driver	Team	Make	Pts
1	11	Daniel Hemric	Kaulig Racing	Chevrolet	10
2	39	Ryan Sieg	RSS Racing	Ford	9
3	1	Sam Mayer	JR Motorsports	Chevrolet	8
4	16	A. J. Allmendinger	Kaulig Racing	Chevrolet	7
5	7	Justin Allgaier	JR Motorsports	Chevrolet	6
6	68	Brandon Brown	Brandonbilt Motorsports	Chevrolet	5
7	54	Ty Gibbs	Joe Gibbs Racing	Toyota	4
8	8	Josh Berry	JR Motorsports	Chevrolet	3
9	19	Brandon Jones	Joe Gibbs Racing	Toyota	2
10	98	Riley Herbst	Stewart-Haas Racing	Ford	1

Stage 3 Laps: 60

Fin.	St	#	Driver	Team	Make	Laps	Led	Status	Points
1	2	21	Austin Hill (R)	Richard Childress Racing	Chevrolet	120	23	running	47
2	11	16	A. J. Allmendinger	Kaulig Racing	Chevrolet	120	18	running	51
3	14	9	Noah Gragson	JR Motorsports	Chevrolet	120	12	running	40
4	10	98	Riley Herbst	Stewart-Haas Racing	Ford	120	0	running	42
5	17	7	Justin Allgaier	JR Motorsports	Chevrolet	120	0	running	42
6	4	2	Sheldon Creed (R)	Richard Childress Racing	Chevrolet	120	0	running	31
7	16	23	Anthony Alfredo	Our Motorsports	Chevrolet	120	0	running	30
8	19	39	Ryan Sieg	RSS Racing	Ford	120	0	running	41
9	31	36	Josh Bilicki	DGM Racing	Chevrolet	120	0	running	28
10	13	68	Brandon Brown	Brandonbilt Motorsports	Chevrolet	120	10	running	34
11	15	54	Ty Gibbs	Joe Gibbs Racing	Toyota	120	12	running	35
12	38	26	Ryan Truex	Sam Hunt Racing	Toyota	120	3	running	25
13	21	66	J. J. Yeley	MBM Motorsports	Chevrolet	120	0	running	24
14	6	10	Landon Cassill	Kaulig Racing	Chevrolet	120	0	running	23
15	20	24	Jeffrey Earnhardt	Sam Hunt Racing	Toyota	120	0	running	22
16	7	8	Josh Berry	JR Motorsports	Chevrolet	120	1	running	24
17	9	19	Brandon Jones	Joe Gibbs Racing	Toyota	120	0	running	22
18	8	6	Ryan Vargas	JD Motorsports	Chevrolet	120	0	running	19
19	27	27	Jeb Burton	Our Motorsports	Chevrolet	120	0	running	18
20	25	4	Bayley Currey	JD Motorsports	Chevrolet	120	0	running	17
21	36	28	Kyle Sieg	RSS Racing	Ford	120	0	running	16
22	33	31	Myatt Snider	Jordan Anderson Racing	Chevrolet	119	0	accident	15
23	3	48	Jade Buford	Big Machine Racing	Chevrolet	119	0	accident	14
24	32	44	Tommy Joe Martins	Alpha Prime Racing	Chevrolet	119	0	accident	13
25	18	5	Matt Mills	B. J. McLeod Motorsports	Chevrolet	119	0	accident	12
26	28	53	Joey Gase	Emerling-Gase Motorsports	Ford	119	0	running	11
27	30	34	Jesse Iwuji (R)	Jesse Iwuji Motorsports	Chevrolet	118	0	running	10
28	1	11	Daniel Hemric	Kaulig Racing	Chevrolet	116	38	running	29
29	29	07	Joe Graf Jr.	SS-Green Light Racing	Ford	110	3	running	8
30	34	1	Sam Mayer	JR Motorsports	Chevrolet	105	0	running	16
31	24	78	Josh Williams	DGM Motorsports	Chevrolet	95	0	accident	6
32	23	92	Kyle Weatherman	DGM Motorsports	Chevrolet	91	0	accident	5
33	37	35	Shane Lee	Emerling-Gase Motorsports	Toyota	91	0	accident	4
34	5	02	Brett Moffitt	Our Motorsports	Chevrolet	91	0	accident	3
35	26	38	C. J. McLaughlin	RSS Racing	Ford	91	0	accident	2
36	12	18	Drew Dollar	Joe Gibbs Racing	Toyota	14	0	accident	1
37	35	51	Jeremy Clements	Jeremy Clements Racing	Chevrolet	13	0	accident	1
38	22	45	Caesar Bacarella	Alpha Prime Racing	Chevrolet	11	0	engine	1
Official race results

== Standings after the race ==
Drivers' Championship standings

Pos	Driver	Points
1	A. J. Allmendinger	51
2	Austin Hill	47 (-4)
3	Riley Herbst	42 (–9)
4	Justin Allgaier	42 (–9)
5	Ryan Sieg	41 (–10)
6	Noah Gragson	40 (–11)
7	Ty Gibbs	35 (–16)
8	Brandon Brown	34 (–17)
9	Sheldon Creed	31 (–20)
10	Anthony Alfredo	30 (–21)
11	Daniel Hemric	29 (–22)
12	Josh Bilicki	28 (–23)
Official driver's standings

- Note: Only the first 12 positions are included for the driver standings.

Previous race: 2021 NASCAR Xfinity Series Championship Race	NASCAR Xfinity Series; 2022 season	Next race: 2022 Production Alliance Group 300
