= 2020 Toyota 200 =

NASCAR Xfinity Series race

Race details
- Race 5 of 33 in the 2020 NASCAR Xfinity Series season
- Date: May 19, 2020
- Location: Darlington Raceway in Darlington, South Carolina
- Course: Permanent racing facility
- Course length: 1.366 miles (2.198 km)
- Distance: 147 laps, 200.802 mi (323.16 km)

Pole position
Driver	Noah Gragson	JR Motorsports
- Grid positions set by ballot

Most laps led
Driver	Noah Gragson	JR Motorsports
- Laps: 46

Winner
No. 98	Chase Briscoe	Stewart-Haas Racing

Television in the United States
- Network: FS1
- Announcers: Adam Alexander, Clint Bowyer, and Michael Waltrip

Radio in the United States
- Radio: MRN
- Booth announcers: Alex Hayden and Dave Moody
- Turn announcers: Dillon Welch and Steve Post

The 2020 Toyota 200 was a NASCAR Xfinity Series race held on May 21, 2020—postponed from May 19, 2020 due to weather—at Darlington Raceway in Darlington, South Carolina. The race replaced the Chicagoland 300 for the 2020 season. Contested over 147 laps on the 1.366-mile (2.198 km) egg-shaped oval, it was the fifth race of the 2020 NASCAR Xfinity Series season. Chase Briscoe took home his second victory of the season in NASCAR's return from the COVID-19 pandemic.

== Report ==
=== Background ===
The Toyota 200 marked the Xfinity Series' return to racing following a 10-week break caused by the COVID-19 pandemic, which began with the postponement of the Atlanta race weekend on March 13 and continued through mid-May.

On April 30, NASCAR announced their return to racing with two Cup Series races and an Xfinity Series race at Darlington, with Cup races held Sunday, May 17 and Wednesday, May 20 and the Xfinity Series race held Tuesday, May 19 (later postponed to May 21 due to weather). Due to the pandemic, the race was held without fans in attendance.

This was the first Xfinity Series race held at Darlington in the spring since 2014, and the first Darlington race branded the Toyota 200 since 2004.

=== Entry list ===
- (R) denotes rookie driver.
- (i) denotes driver who is ineligible for series driver points.

No.	Driver	Team	Manufacturer
0	Jeffrey Earnhardt	JD Motorsports	Chevrolet
1	Michael Annett	JR Motorsports	Chevrolet
02	Brett Moffitt (i)	Our Motorsports	Chevrolet
4	Jesse Little (R)	JD Motorsports	Chevrolet
5	Matt Mills	B. J. McLeod Motorsports	Chevrolet
6	B. J. McLeod	JD Motorsports	Chevrolet
7	Justin Allgaier	JR Motorsports	Chevrolet
07	Ray Black Jr.	SS-Green Light Racing	Chevrolet
8	Daniel Hemric	JR Motorsports	Chevrolet
08	Joe Graf Jr. (R)	SS-Green Light Racing	Chevrolet
9	Noah Gragson	JR Motorsports	Chevrolet
10	Ross Chastain	Kaulig Racing	Chevrolet
11	Justin Haley	Kaulig Racing	Chevrolet
13	Chad Finchum	MBM Motorsports	Toyota
15	Colby Howard	JD Motorsports	Chevrolet
18	Riley Herbst (R)	Joe Gibbs Racing	Toyota
19	Brandon Jones	Joe Gibbs Racing	Toyota
20	Harrison Burton (R)	Joe Gibbs Racing	Toyota
21	Anthony Alfredo	Richard Childress Racing	Chevrolet
22	Austin Cindric	Team Penske	Ford
26	Colin Garrett	Sam Hunt Racing	Toyota
36	Ronnie Bassett Jr.	DGM Racing	Chevrolet
39	Ryan Sieg	RSS Racing	Chevrolet
44	Tommy Joe Martins	Martins Motorsports	Chevrolet
47	Joe Nemechek (i)	Mike Harmon Racing	Chevrolet
51	Jeremy Clements	Jeremy Clements Racing	Chevrolet
52	Kody Vanderwal (R)	Means Racing	Chevrolet
54	Kyle Busch (i)	Joe Gibbs Racing	Toyota
61	Timmy Hill (i)	Hattori Racing	Toyota
66	Stephen Leicht	MBM Motorsports	Toyota
68	Brandon Brown	Brandonbilt Motorsports	Chevrolet
74	Bayley Currey (i)	Mike Harmon Racing	Chevrolet
78	Vinnie Miller	B. J. McLeod Motorsports	Chevrolet
89	Landon Cassill	Shepherd Racing	Chevrolet
90	Alex Labbé	DGM Racing	Chevrolet
92	Josh Williams	DGM Racing	Chevrolet
93	Myatt Snider	RSS Racing	Chevrolet
98	Chase Briscoe	Stewart-Haas Racing	Ford
99	Mason Massey	B. J. McLeod Motorsports	Toyota
Official entry list

== Qualifying ==
Under modified operational procedures, no qualifying sessions were held for this race. The starting order was determined by a random draw, with drivers grouped into pots of positions based on segments of the owners' points standings going into the race. Additionally, NASCAR announced they were expanding the field of Xfinity Series entries from 36 to 40 due to the lack of qualifying.

=== Starting Lineup ===
Pos	No	Driver	Team	Manufacturer
1	9	Noah Gragson	JR Motorsports	Chevrolet
2	1	Michael Annett	JR Motorsports	Chevrolet
3	11	Justin Haley	Kaulig Racing	Chevrolet
4	39	Ryan Sieg	RSS Racing	Chevrolet
5	18	Riley Herbst (R)	Joe Gibbs Racing	Toyota
6	68	Brandon Brown	Brandonbilt Motorsports	Chevrolet
7	22	Austin Cindric	Team Penske	Ford
8	19	Brandon Jones	Joe Gibbs Racing	Toyota
9	10	Ross Chastain	Kaulig Racing	Chevrolet
10	7	Justin Allgaier	JR Motorsports	Chevrolet
11	98	Chase Briscoe	Stewart-Haas Racing	Ford
12	20	Harrison Burton (R)	Joe Gibbs Racing	Toyota
13	6	B. J. McLeod	JD Motorsports	Chevrolet
14	93	Myatt Snider	RSS Racing	Chevrolet
15	92	Josh Williams	DGM Racing	Chevrolet
16	90	Alex Labbé	DGM Racing	Chevrolet
17	21	Anthony Alfredo	Richard Childress Racing	Chevrolet
18	4	Jesse Little (R)	JD Motorsports	Chevrolet
19	07	Ray Black Jr.	SS-Green Light Racing	Chevrolet
20	78	Vinnie Miller	B. J. McLeod Motorsports	Chevrolet
21	52	Kody Vanderwal (R)	Means Racing	Chevrolet
22	02	Brett Moffitt (i)	Our Motorsports	Chevrolet
23	8	Daniel Hemric	JR Motorsports	Chevrolet
24	13	Chad Finchum	MBM Motorsports	Toyota
25	44	Tommy Joe Martins	Martins Motorsports	Chevrolet
26	54	Kyle Busch (i)	Joe Gibbs Racing	Toyota
27	5	Matt Mills	B. J. McLeod Motorsports	Chevrolet
28	61	Timmy Hill (i)	Hattori Racing	Toyota
29	47	Joe Nemechek (i)	Mike Harmon Racing	Chevrolet
30	51	Jeremy Clements	Jeremy Clements Racing	Chevrolet
31	15	Colby Howard	JD Motorsports	Chevrolet
32	36	Ronnie Bassett Jr.	DGM Racing	Chevrolet
33	99	Mason Massey	B. J. McLeod Motorsports	Toyota
34	0	Jeffrey Earnhardt	JD Motorsports	Chevrolet
35	74	Bayley Currey (i)	Mike Harmon Racing	Chevrolet
36	08	Joe Graf Jr. (R)	SS-Green Light Racing	Chevrolet
37	66	Stephen Leicht	MBM Motorsports	Toyota
38	89	Landon Cassill	Shepherd Racing	Chevrolet
39	26	Colin Garrett	Sam Hunt Racing	Toyota
Official starting lineup

== Race ==
=== Race results ===
==== Stage Results ====
Stage One

Laps: 45

Pos	No	Driver	Team	Manufacturer	Points
1	9	Noah Gragson	JR Motorsports	Chevrolet	10
2	10	Ross Chastain	Kaulig Racing	Chevrolet	9
3	39	Ryan Sieg	RSS Racing	Chevrolet	8
4	54	Kyle Busch (i)	Joe Gibbs Racing	Toyota	0
5	22	Austin Cindric	Team Penske	Ford	6
6	7	Justin Allgaier	JR Motorsports	Chevrolet	5
7	8	Daniel Hemric	JR Motorsports	Chevrolet	4
8	98	Chase Briscoe	Stewart-Haas Racing	Ford	3
9	1	Michael Annett	JR Motorsports	Chevrolet	2
10	11	Justin Haley	Kaulig Racing	Chevrolet	1

Stage Two

Laps: 45

Pos	No	Driver	Team	Manufacturer	Points
1	54	Kyle Busch (i)	Joe Gibbs Racing	Toyota	0
2	7	Justin Allgaier	JR Motorsports	Chevrolet	9
3	9	Noah Gragson	JR Motorsports	Chevrolet	8
4	98	Chase Briscoe	Stewart-Haas Racing	Ford	7
5	1	Michael Annett	JR Motorsports	Chevrolet	6
6	8	Daniel Hemric	JR Motorsports	Chevrolet	5
7	10	Ross Chastain	Kaulig Racing	Chevrolet	4
8	22	Austin Cindric	Team Penske	Ford	3
9	39	Ryan Sieg	RSS Racing	Chevrolet	2
10	51	Jeremy Clements	Jeremy Clements Racing	Chevrolet	1

=== Final Stage Results ===
Laps: 57

Pos	Grid	No	Driver	Team	Manufacturer	Laps	Points	Status
1	11	98	Chase Briscoe	Stewart-Haas Racing	Ford	147	50	Running
2	26	54	Kyle Busch (i)	Joe Gibbs Racing	Toyota	147	0	Running
3	10	7	Justin Allgaier	JR Motorsports	Chevrolet	147	48	Running
4	7	22	Austin Cindric	Team Penske	Ford	147	42	Running
5	1	9	Noah Gragson	JR Motorsports	Chevrolet	147	50	Running
6	23	8	Daniel Hemric	JR Motorsports	Chevrolet	147	40	Running
7	4	39	Ryan Sieg	RSS Racing	Chevrolet	147	40	Running
8	9	10	Ross Chastain	Kaulig Racing	Chevrolet	147	42	Running
9	12	20	Harrison Burton (R)	Joe Gibbs Racing	Toyota	147	28	Running
10	3	11	Justin Haley	Kaulig Racing	Chevrolet	147	28	Running
11	22	02	Brett Moffitt (i)	Our Motorsports	Chevrolet	147	0	Running
12	30	51	Jeremy Clements	Jeremy Clements Racing	Chevrolet	147	26	Running
13	6	68	Brandon Brown	Brandonbilt Motorsports	Chevrolet	147	24	Running
14	17	21	Anthony Alfredo	Richard Childress Racing	Chevrolet	147	23	Running
15	13	6	B. J. McLeod	JD Motorsports	Chevrolet	147	22	Running
16	15	92	Josh Williams	DGM Racing	Chevrolet	147	21	Running
17	16	90	Alex Labbé	DGM Racing	Chevrolet	147	20	Running
18	5	18	Riley Herbst (R)	Joe Gibbs Racing	Toyota	147	19	Running
19	36	08	Joe Graf Jr. (R)	SS-Green Light Racing	Chevrolet	147	18	Running
20	8	19	Brandon Jones	Joe Gibbs Racing	Toyota	147	17	Running
21	19	07	Ray Black Jr.	SS-Green Light Racing	Chevrolet	147	16	Running
22	28	61	Timmy Hill (i)	Hattori Racing	Toyota	147	0	Running
23	34	0	Jeffrey Earnhardt	JD Motorsports	Chevrolet	147	14	Running
24	24	13	Chad Finchum	MBM Motorsports	Toyota	147	13	Running
25	2	1	Michael Annett	JR Motorsports	Chevrolet	146	20	Running
26	25	44	Tommy Joe Martins	Martins Motorsports	Chevrolet	146	11	Running
27	31	15	Colby Howard	JD Motorsports	Chevrolet	146	10	Running
28	29	47	Joe Nemechek (i)	Mike Harmon Racing	Chevrolet	145	0	Running
29	20	78	Vinnie Miller	B. J. McLeod Motorsports	Chevrolet	145	8	Running
30	33	99	Mason Massey	B. J. McLeod Motorsports	Toyota	143	7	Running
31	32	36	Ronnie Bassett Jr.	DGM Racing	Chevrolet	143	6	Running
32	21	52	Kody Vanderwal (R)	Means Racing	Chevrolet	142	5	Running
33	35	74	Bayley Currey (i)	Mike Harmon Racing	Chevrolet	142	0	Running
34	27	5	Matt Mills	B. J. McLeod Motorsports	Chevrolet	135	3	Running
35	14	93	Myatt Snider	RSS Racing	Chevrolet	129	2	Running
36	18	4	Jesse Little (R)	JD Motorsports	Chevrolet	122	1	Vibration
37	39	26	Colin Garrett	Sam Hunt Racing	Toyota	111	1	Running
38	38	89	Landon Cassill	Shepherd Racing	Chevrolet	35	1	Handling
39	37	66	Stephen Leicht	MBM Motorsports	Toyota	1	1	Suspension
Official race results

=== Race statistics ===
- Lead changes: 10 among 6 different drivers
- Cautions/Laps: 5 for 28
- Red flags: 0
- Time of race: 1 hour, 44 minutes, 26 seconds
- Average speed: 115.367 mph (185.665 km/h)

== Media ==
=== Television ===
The Toyota 200 was carried by FS1 in the United States. Adam Alexander, Stewart-Haas Racing driver Clint Bowyer, and Michael Waltrip called the race from the Fox Sports Studio in Charlotte, with Regan Smith covering pit road.

FS1
Booth announcers	Pit reporter
Lap-by-lap: Adam Alexander Color-commentator: Clint Bowyer Color-commentator: Michael Waltrip	Regan Smith

=== Radio ===
The Motor Racing Network (MRN) called the race for radio, which was simulcast on SiriusXM NASCAR Radio. Alex Hayden and Dave Moody anchored the action from the booth. Dillon Welch called the action from Turns 1 & 2 and Steve Post called the race through turns 3 & 4. Kim Coon and Hannah Newhouse provided reports from pit road.

MRN Radio
Booth announcers	Turn announcers	Pit reporters
Lead announcer: Alex Hayden Announcer: Dave Moody	Turns 1 & 2: Dillon Welch Turns 3 & 4: Steve Post	Kim Coon Hannah Newhouse

== Standings after the race ==
Drivers' Championship standings

	Pos	Driver	Points
1	1	Chase Briscoe	223
1	2	Harrison Burton (R)	204 (-19)
	3	Austin Cindric	197 (-26)
2	4	Noah Gragson	193 (-30)
	5	Ross Chastain	188 (-35)
3	6	Justin Allgaier	186 (-37)
	7	Ryan Sieg	183 (-40)
	8	Justin Haley	168 (-55)
5	9	Brandon Jones	165 (-58)
	10	Michael Annett	139 (-84)
	11	Riley Herbst (R)	128 (-95)
	12	Brandon Brown	115 (-108)
Official driver's standings

Note: Only the first 12 positions are included for the driver standings.

Previous race: 2020 LS Tractor 200	NASCAR Xfinity Series; 2020 season	Next race: 2020 Alsco 300 (Charlotte)
