= Matt Mills (racing driver) =

American racing driver (born 1996)

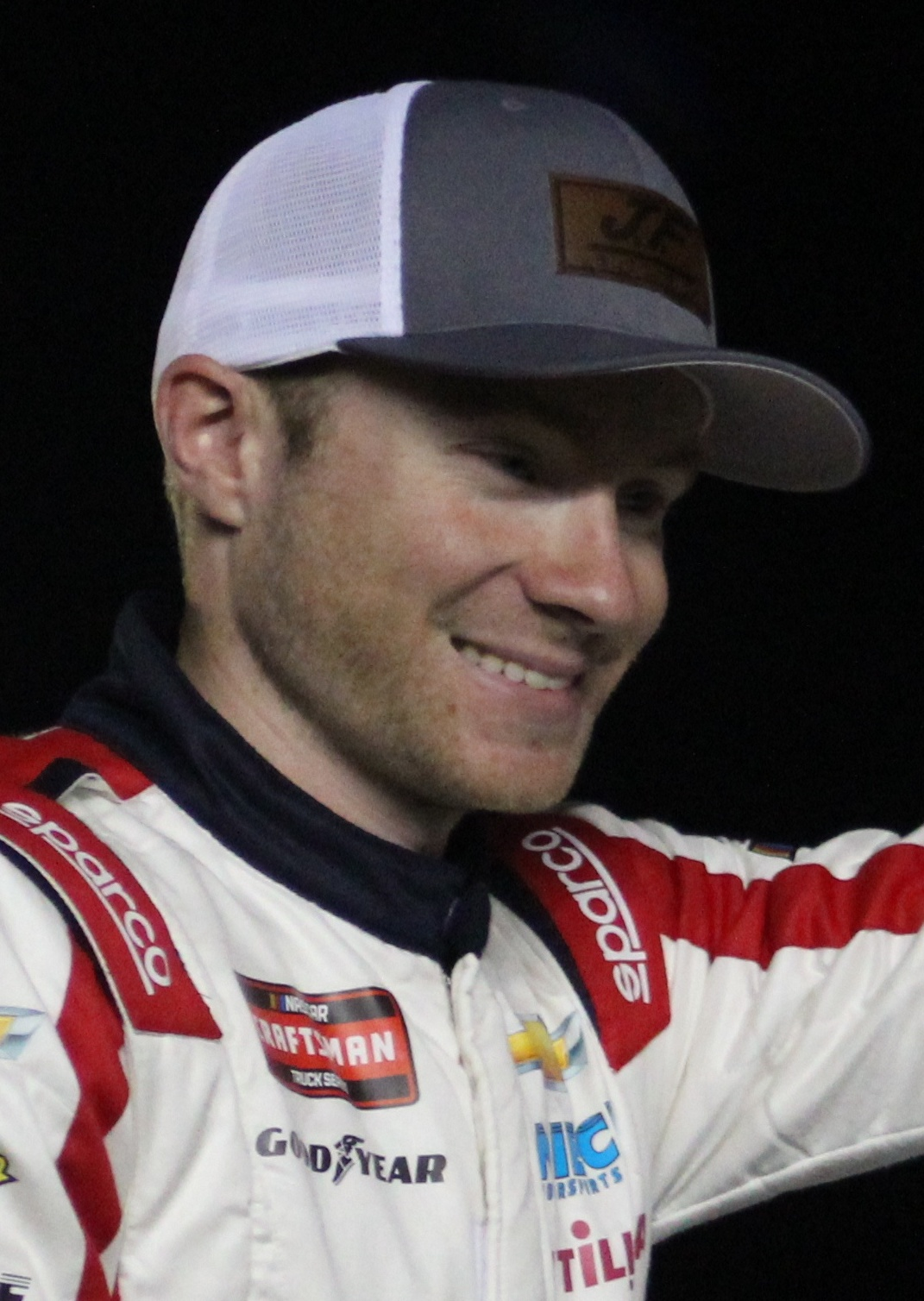
- Mills at Daytona International Speedway in 2024
- Born: Matthew Robert Mills; November 14, 1996 (age 30); Lynchburg, Virginia, U.S.

NASCAR Cup Series career
- 1 race run over 1 year
- 2021 position: 67th
- Best finish: 67th (2021)
- First race: 2021 Buschy McBusch Race 400 (Kansas)
Wins	Top tens	Poles
0	0	0

NASCAR O'Reilly Auto Parts Series career
- 124 races run over 8 years
- 2025 position: 95th
- Best finish: 21st (2019)
- First race: 2017 DC Solar 200 (Phoenix)
- Last race: 2025 Nu Way 200 (Gateway)
Wins	Top tens	Poles
0	1	0

NASCAR FedEx Freight Truck Series career
- 72 races run over 8 years
- 2026 position: 75th
- Best finish: 17th (2025)
- First race: 2016 UNOH 200 (Bristol)
- Last race: 2026 Ecosave 200 (Charlotte)
Wins	Top tens	Poles
0	5	0
- Statistics up to date as of November 6, 2026.

Matthew Robert Mills (born November 14, 1996) is an American professional stock car racing driver. He last competed part-time in the NASCAR Craftsman Truck Series, driving the No. 4 Chevrolet Silverado RST for Niece Motorsports. He has also previously competed in the NASCAR Cup Series and NASCAR Xfinity Series.

== Racing career ==
=== Early years ===
Mills started racing at age twelve in go-karts. A year later, he moved up to Junior Champ Karts and spent three years racing those. Mills started racing Open Wheel Modifieds at Midvale Speedway in 2012, winning Rookie of the Year and moving up to Outlaw Super Late Models in 2013. He attended a rookie seminar for NASCAR at Daytona Beach, Florida the following year and received clearance to race in the ARCA Racing Series and K&N Pro Series, but has yet to race in either of those series, instead running a limited schedule in the JEGS/CRA Pro Series in 2015 as well as continuing his late model career.

=== Craftsman Truck Series ===
On June 29, 2016, it was announced that Mills would join SS-Green Light Racing for "select races" in the 2016 NASCAR Camping World Truck Series. He made his first start at Bristol Motor Speedway in August, finishing 27th. Mills ran four more races for SS-Green Light in 2016, scoring the best finish of 21st in the season's penultimate race at Phoenix International Raceway.

In 2017, Mills joined Faith Motorsports for three races because the team's primary driver Donnie Levister was unapproved by NASCAR to run intermediate tracks. He ran seventeenth in two of them, career-best finishes, before he joined Martins Motorsports to run in multiple races in the truck No. 42 with sponsorship from Thompson Electric Inc. starting in Iowa. The truck never hit the track at Iowa and was never entered thereafter, however, the truck was included in the original edition of the 2017 video game NASCAR Heat 2. He drove the No. 44 for Martins the following week but fell out due to an accident. He then start and parked with Jennifer Jo Cobb Racing for a few races in the latter part of 2017.

Mills drove the No. 20 truck for Young's Motorsports part-time in 2022 in addition to running the majority of the Xfinity Series season for B. J. McLeod Motorsports in their No. 5 car. He returned to the team in 2023 to drive their No. 20 truck again in Las Vegas in March.

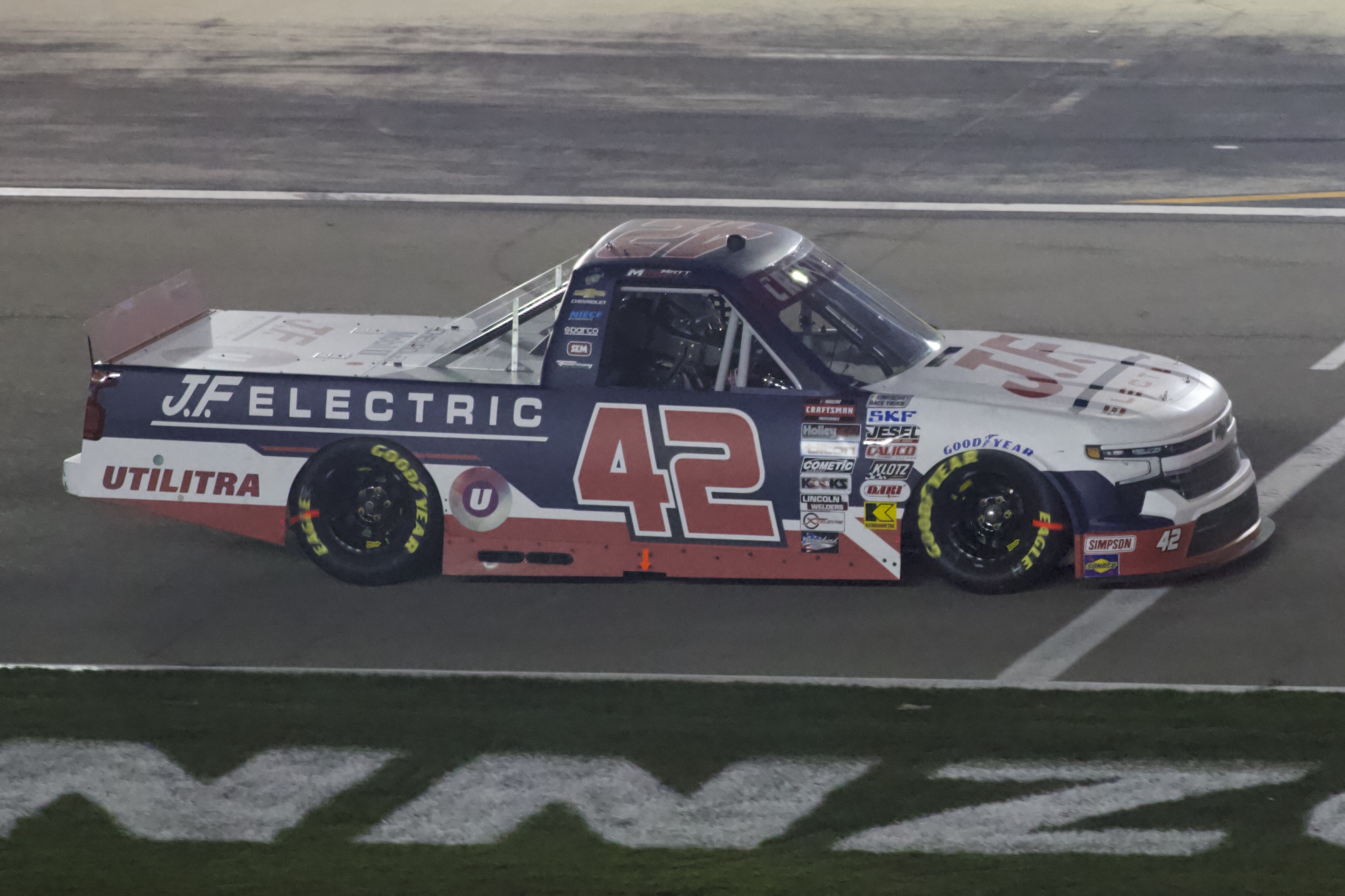
Mills' No. 42 truck at Las Vegas Motor Speedway in 2024.

On October 12, 2023, Niece Motorsports announced that Mills would drive the No. 42 full-time in 2024, with Carson Hocevar moving up to the Cup Series in the Spire Motorsports No. 77. At 2024 Baptist Health 200, he was injured after Conner Jones intentionally sent him to the turn 3 wall. Jones was held for two laps during the race, then suspended for the following race at Martinsville, for the contact.

On September 24, 2024, Niece Motorsports announced that Mills would continue on the team for 2025.

=== Xfinity Series ===
In March 2017, Mills was named the driver for B. J. McLeod Motorsports' No. 8 entry at Phoenix in what looked to be a one-race deal, replacing regular driver Jeff Green who had been signed to run the full season. Mills finished 30th in his debut. He returned to the series over a month later at Richmond, again driving McLeod's No. 8. His next start in the series came at Chicago in September with JD Motorsports, start and parking their fourth car, the No. 15. In the season's final weekend, he failed to qualify with startup team NextGen Motorsports.

On February 2, 2018, it was announced that Mills would drive the No. 15 car for all but one race in 2018, skipping the season-opening race at Daytona International Speedway. He had previously been in consideration for the team's No. 0 car, which ultimately was driven by Garrett Smithley. He did not qualify for the Texas race in April because of inspection issues. The agreement wound up falling through, as Mills was replaced by Joe Nemechek for the Fitzgerald Glider Kits 300 at Bristol Motor Speedway. Mills returned for a couple more races but parted ways with JDM after the June Michigan race. He made a start for DGR-Crosley in the NASCAR Camping World Truck Series at Michigan in August, but wrecked, self-admittedly due to inexperience.

Mills returned to B. J. McLeod Motorsports for some fall Xfinity races, eventually becoming the team's full-time driver of the No. 8 in 2019. However, the number changed to 5 after the team agreed to give up their No. 8 for JR Motorsports in a number swap, and McLeod's team received the No. 5, the car number JRM dropped so they could get the No. 8.

On August 27, 2025, it was announced that Mills would drive the No. 91 DGM Racing with Jesse Iwuji Motorsports Chevrolet for Gateway.

=== Cup Series ===
On April 26, 2021, B. J. McLeod Motorsports announced that they would be fielding a Cup Series car in the spring race at Kansas, the No. 55, and that Mills would be the driver. It was his debut in the series. Although BJMM uses Chevrolets or Toyotas in the Xfinity Series, the car in this race was a Ford from McLeod's Live Fast Motorsports team, which he fielded in the Cup Series but was a separate entity from BJMM.

== Motorsports career results ==
=== NASCAR ===
(key) (Bold – Pole position awarded by qualifying time. Italics – Pole position earned by points standings or practice time. * – Most laps led.)

==== Cup Series ====
NASCAR Cup Series results
Year	Team	No.	Make	1	2	3	4	5	6	7	8	9	10	11	12	13	14	15	16	17	18	19	20	21	22	23	24	25	26	27	28	29	30	31	32	33	34	35	36	NCSC	Pts	Ref
2021	B. J. McLeod Motorsports	55	Ford	DAY	DRC	HOM	LVS	PHO	ATL	BRD	MAR	RCH	TAL	KAN; 38	DAR	DOV	COA	CLT	SON	NSS	POC	POC	ROA	ATL	NHA	GLN	IRC	MCH	DAY	DAR	RCH	BRI	LVS	TAL	ROV	TEX	KAN	MAR	PHO	67th	0^{1}	

==== Xfinity Series ====
NASCAR Xfinity Series results
Year	Team	No.	Make	1	2	3	4	5	6	7	8	9	10	11	12	13	14	15	16	17	18	19	20	21	22	23	24	25	26	27	28	29	30	31	32	33	NXSC	Pts	Ref
2017	B. J. McLeod Motorsports	8	Chevy	DAY	ATL	LVS	PHO; 30	CAL	TEX	BRI	RCH; 31	TAL	CLT	DOV	POC	MCH	IOW	DAY	KEN	NHA	IND	IOW	GLN	MOH	BRI	ROA	DAR	RCH									109th	0^{1}	
2017	JD Motorsports	15	Chevy																										CHI; 40	KEN	DOV	CLT	KAN	TEX	PHO		109th	0^{1}	
2017	NextGen Motorsports	55	Toyota																																	HOM; DNQ	109th	0^{1}	
2018	JD Motorsports	0	Chevy	DAY	ATL; 36	LVS; 27																															53rd	43	
2018	JD Motorsports	15	Chevy				PHO; 38	CAL; 37	TEX; DNQ	BRI	RCH	TAL	DOV	CLT	POC; 27	MCH; 36	IOW	CHI	DAY	KEN	NHA	IOW	GLN	MOH	BRI	ROA	DAR	IND	LVS								53rd	43	
2018	B. J. McLeod Motorsports	78	Chevy																											RCH; 27	ROV						53rd	43	
2018	B. J. McLeod Motorsports	8	Chevy																													DOV; 28	KAN	TEX	PHO	HOM	53rd	43	
2019	B. J. McLeod Motorsports	5	Toyota	DAY; 26								TAL; 17			POC; 30				DAY; 10																		21st	372	
2019	B. J. McLeod Motorsports	5	Chevy		ATL; 30	LVS; 29	PHO; 28	CAL; 23	TEX; 27	BRI; 21	RCH; 28		DOV; 31	CLT; 26		MCH; 24	IOW; 26	CHI; 27		KEN; 23	NHA; 20	IOW; 18	GLN	MOH	BRI; 18	ROA	DAR; 31	IND; 25	LVS; 24			DOV; 24	KAN; 20				21st	372	
2019	B. J. McLeod Motorsports	99	Chevy																											RCH; 28	ROV						21st	372	
2019	B. J. McLeod Motorsports	78	Chevy																															TEX; 18	PHO; 19	HOM; 30	21st	372	
2020	B. J. McLeod Motorsports	5	Toyota	DAY; 31										TAL; 38			KEN; 30	KEN; 19	TEX; 26	KAN; 26	ROA				DAY; 16					LVS; 30	TAL; 21	ROV; 25	KAN; 25	TEX; 13			25th	346	
2020	B. J. McLeod Motorsports	5	Chevy		LVS; 25	CAL; 27	PHO; DNQ	DAR; 34	CLT; 30	BRI; 25	ATL; 30	HOM; 27	HOM; 24		POC; 25	IRC; 30						DRC; 22	DOV; 33	DOV; 30			RCH; 13	RCH; 13	BRI; 22						MAR; 38	PHO; 35	25th	346	
2020	B. J. McLeod Motorsports	99	Chevy																							DAR; 22											25th	346	
2021	B. J. McLeod Motorsports	5	Chevy	DAY; 16			LVS; 39	PHO; 35	ATL; 34	MAR; 33		DAR; 40			CLT; 35			NSS; 25	POC; 23	ROA	ATL; 26	NHA; 32			MCH; 14		DAR; 23	RCH; 21		LVS; 28					MAR; 29	PHO; 29	29th	271	
2021	B. J. McLeod Motorsports	5	Toyota		DRC; 19	HOM; 29					TAL; 25		DOV; 27	COA		MOH; 23	TEX; 26						GLN; 38	IRC		DAY; 33					TAL; 23	ROV; 30					29th	271	
2021	B. J. McLeod Motorsports	99	Chevy																										BRI; 36				TEX; 32	KAN; 25			29th	271	
2022	B. J. McLeod Motorsports	5	Chevy	DAY; 25	CAL; 23	LVS; 35	PHO	ATL; 31	COA		MAR; 18	TAL; 31	DOV; 31	DAR; 31	TEX; 37					ATL; 37										TEX; 16	TAL	ROV	LVS; 35	HOM; 32	MAR; 35	PHO; DNQ	96th	0^{1}	
2022	B. J. McLeod Motorsports	55	Chevy							RCH; DNQ						CLT; 20	PIR																				96th	0^{1}	
2022	B. J. McLeod Motorsports	99	Chevy															NSS; DNQ	ROA																		96th	0^{1}	
2022	B. J. McLeod Motorsports	78	Chevy																		NHA; 22	POC	IRC	MCH; 38	GLN												96th	0^{1}	
2022	B. J. McLeod Motorsports	78	Toyota																							DAY; 24	DAR	KAN	BRI								96th	0^{1}	
2023	Emerling-Gase Motorsports	53	Ford	DAY	CAL	LVS	PHO	ATL	COA	RCH	MAR; 22	TAL	DOV	DAR; 28	CLT	PIR	SON	NSS	CSC	ATL	NHA	POC	ROA	MCH	IRC	GLN	DAY										96th	0^{1}	
2023	Emerling-Gase Motorsports	53	Toyota																									DAR; 27						HOM; DNQ	MAR	PHO	96th	0^{1}	
2023	Emerling-Gase Motorsports	53	Chevy																										KAN; 19	BRI	TEX	ROV	LVS				96th	0^{1}	
2025	DGM Racing with Jesse Iwuji Motorsports	91	Chevy	DAY	ATL	COA	PHO	LVS	HOM	MAR	DAR	BRI	CAR	TAL	TEX	CLT	NSS	MXC	POC	ATL	CSC	SON	DOV	IND	IOW	GLN	DAY	PIR	GTW; 21	BRI	KAN	ROV	LVS	TAL	MAR	PHO	95th	0^{1}	

==== Craftsman Truck Series ====
NASCAR Craftsman Truck Series results
Year	Team	No.	Make	1	2	3	4	5	6	7	8	9	10	11	12	13	14	15	16	17	18	19	20	21	22	23	24	25	NCTC	Pts	Ref
2016	SS-Green Light Racing	07	Chevy	DAY	ATL	MAR	KAN	DOV	CLT	TEX	IOW	GTW	KEN	ELD	POC	BRI; 27	MCH	MSP	CHI	NHA; 23	LVS	TAL	MAR	TEX; 29	PHO; 21	HOM			42nd	32	
2017	Faith Motorsports	44	Chevy	DAY	ATL	MAR	KAN; 17	CLT; 24	DOV; 17	TEX	GTW	IOW																	42nd	50	
2017	Martins Motorsports	44	Chevy										KEN; 29	ELD															42nd	50	
2017	Jennifer Jo Cobb Racing	0	Chevy												POC; 27	MCH	BRI	MSP	CHI	NHA	LVS; 25	TAL	MAR	TEX	PHO	HOM			42nd	50	
2018	DGR-Crosley	54	Toyota	DAY	ATL	LVS	MAR	DOV	KAN	CLT	TEX	IOW	GTW	CHI	KEN	ELD	POC	MCH; 31	BRI	MSP	LVS	TAL	MAR	TEX	PHO	HOM			113th	0^{1}	
2022	Young's Motorsports	20	Chevy	DAY	LVS; 15	ATL; 35	COA	MAR	BRD	DAR	KAN; 34	TEX	CLT; 34	GTW; DNQ	SON	KNX	NSS	MOH	POC	IRP	RCH	KAN	BRI	TAL	HOM	PHO			97th	0^{1}	
2023	Young's Motorsports	20	Chevy	DAY	LVS; 26	ATL	COA	TEX; 31	BRD	MAR	KAN	DAR	NWS	CLT; 30	GTW; 19	NSS	MOH; 22	POC											34th	108	
2023	Kyle Busch Motorsports	51	Chevy																RCH; 5		MLW; 25	KAN	BRI	TAL	HOM	PHO			34th	108	
2023	Young's Motorsports	02	Chevy																	IRP; 23									34th	108	
2024	Niece Motorsports	42	Chevy	DAY; 26	ATL; 27	LVS; 31	BRI; 25	COA; 24	MAR; 29	TEX; 26	KAN; 23	DAR; 11	NWS; 18	CLT; 4	GTW; 23	NSS; 8	POC; 11	IRP; 22	RCH; 35	MLW; 24	BRI; 25	KAN; 33	TAL; 31	HOM; 34	MAR; 19	PHO; 25			23rd	328	
2025	Niece Motorsports	42	Chevy	DAY; 29	ATL; 13	LVS; 16	HOM; 14	MAR; 15	BRI; 20	CAR; 30	TEX; 20	KAN; 12	NWS; 25	CLT; 7	NSS; 22	MCH; 23	POC; 20	LRP; 26	IRP; 21	GLN; 9	RCH; 17	DAR; 29	BRI; 16	NHA; 23	ROV; 17	TAL; 19	MAR; 27	PHO; 11	17th	456	
2026	Niece Motorsports	4	Chevy	DAY	ATL	STP	DAR	ROC	BRI	TEX	GLN	DOV	CLT	NSH	MCH	COR	LRP	NWS	IRP	RCH	NHA	BRI	KAN	CLT; 23	PHO	TAL	MAR	HOM	75th	14	

^{*} Season still in progress
^{1} Ineligible for series points
