= 2020 O'Reilly Auto Parts 300 =

Race details
- Race 31 of 33 in the 2020 NASCAR Xfinity Series season
- Date: October 24, 2020
- Location: Texas Motor Speedway in Fort Worth, Texas
- Course: Permanent racing facility
- Course length: 1.50 miles (2.41 km)
- Distance: 200 laps, 300.0 mi (482.80 km)
- Average speed: 115.867 mph

Pole position
Driver	Chase Briscoe	Stewart-Haas Racing
- Grid positions set by competition-based formula

Most laps led
Driver	Noah Gragson	JR Motorsports
- Laps: 43

Winner
No. 20	Harrison Burton	Joe Gibbs Racing

The 2020 O'Reilly Auto Parts 300 was a NASCAR Xfinity Series race held on October 24, 2020. It was contested over 200 laps on the 1.50-mile (2.41 km) oval. It was the thirty-first race of the 2020 NASCAR Xfinity Series season, the fifth race of the playoffs, and the second race in the Round of 8. Joe Gibbs Racing driver Harrison Burton collected his third win of the season.

== Report ==
=== Background ===
Texas Motor Speedway is a speedway located in the northernmost portion of the U.S. city of Fort Worth, Texas – the portion located in Denton County, Texas. The track measures 1.5 miles (2.4 km) around and is banked 24 degrees in the turns, and is of the oval design, where the front straightaway juts outward slightly. The track layout is similar to Atlanta Motor Speedway and Charlotte Motor Speedway (formerly Lowe's Motor Speedway). The track is owned by Speedway Motorsports, Inc., the same company that owns Atlanta and Charlotte Motor Speedways, as well as the short-track Bristol Motor Speedway.

=== Entry list ===
- (R) denotes rookie driver.
- (i) denotes driver who is ineligible for series driver points.

No.	Driver	Team	Manufacturer
0	Jeffrey Earnhardt	JD Motorsports	Chevrolet
1	Michael Annett	JR Motorsports	Chevrolet
02	Brett Moffitt (i)	Our Motorsports	Chevrolet
4	Jesse Little (R)	JD Motorsports	Chevrolet
5	Matt Mills	B. J. McLeod Motorsports	Toyota
6	Ryan Vargas	JD Motorsports	Chevrolet
7	Justin Allgaier	JR Motorsports	Chevrolet
07	David Starr	SS-Green Light Racing	Chevrolet
8	Jeb Burton	JR Motorsports	Chevrolet
08	Joe Graf Jr. (R)	SS-Green Light Racing	Chevrolet
9	Noah Gragson	JR Motorsports	Chevrolet
10	Ross Chastain	Kaulig Racing	Chevrolet
11	Justin Haley	Kaulig Racing	Chevrolet
13	Timmy Hill (i)	MBM Motorsports	Toyota
15	Colby Howard	JD Motorsports	Chevrolet
18	Riley Herbst (R)	Joe Gibbs Racing	Toyota
19	Brandon Jones	Joe Gibbs Racing	Toyota
20	Harrison Burton (R)	Joe Gibbs Racing	Toyota
21	Anthony Alfredo	Richard Childress Racing	Chevrolet
22	Austin Cindric	Team Penske	Ford
36	Alex Labbé	DGM Racing	Chevrolet
39	Ryan Sieg	RSS Racing	Chevrolet
44	Tommy Joe Martins	Martins Motorsports	Chevrolet
47	Kyle Weatherman	Mike Harmon Racing	Chevrolet
51	Jeremy Clements	Jeremy Clements Racing	Chevrolet
52	Kody Vanderwal (R)	Means Racing	Chevrolet
61	Austin Hill (i)	Hattori Racing Enterprises	Toyota
66	Chad Finchum	MBM Motorsports	Toyota
68	Brandon Brown	Brandonbilt Motorsports	Chevrolet
74	Bayley Currey (i)	Mike Harmon Racing	Chevrolet
78	C. J. McLaughlin	B. J. McLeod Motorsports	Toyota
90	B. J. McLeod	DGM Racing	Chevrolet
92	Josh Williams	DGM Racing	Chevrolet
93	Myatt Snider (R)	RSS Racing	Chevrolet
98	Chase Briscoe	Stewart-Haas Racing	Ford
99	Jesse Iwuji (i)	B. J. McLeod Motorsports	Chevrolet
Official entry list

== Qualifying ==
Chase Briscoe was awarded the pole based on competition based formula.

=== Qualifying results ===
Pos	No	Driver	Team	Manufacturer
1	98	Chase Briscoe	Stewart-Haas Racing	Ford
2	11	Justin Haley	Kaulig Racing	Chevrolet
3	19	Brandon Jones	Joe Gibbs Racing	Toyota
4	39	Ryan Sieg	RSS Racing	Chevrolet
5	7	Justin Allgaier	JR Motorsports	Chevrolet
6	10	Ross Chastain	Kaulig Racing	Chevrolet
7	22	Austin Cindric	Team Penske	Ford
8	8	Jeb Burton	JR Motorsports	Chevrolet
9	9	Noah Gragson	JR Motorsports	Chevrolet
10	1	Michael Annett	JR Motorsports	Chevrolet
11	02	Brett Moffitt	Our Motorsports	Chevrolet
12	20	Harrison Burton (R)	Joe Gibbs Racing	Toyota
13	92	Josh Williams	DGM Racing	Chevrolet
14	61	Austin Hill (i)	Hattori Racing Enterprises	Toyota
15	68	Brandon Brown	Brandonbilt Motorsports	Chevrolet
16	51	Jeremy Clements	Jeremy Clements Racing	Chevrolet
17	44	Tommy Joe Martins	Martins Motorsports	Chevrolet
18	21	Anthony Alfredo	Richard Childress Racing	Chevrolet
19	18	Riley Herbst (R)	Joe Gibbs Racing	Toyota
20	36	Alex Labbé	DGM Racing	Chevrolet
21	0	Jeffrey Earnhardt	JD Motorsports	Chevrolet
22	93	Myatt Snider (R)	RSS Racing	Chevrolet
23	07	David Starr	SS-Green Light Racing	Chevrolet
24	74	Bayley Currey (i)	Mike Harmon Racing	Chevrolet
25	13	Timmy Hill (i)	MBM Motorsports	Toyota
26	5	Matt Mills	B. J. McLeod Motorsports	Toyota
27	4	Jesse Little (R)	JD Motorsports	Chevrolet
28	08	Joe Graf Jr. (R)	SS-Green Light Racing	Chevrolet
29	52	Kody Vanderwal (R)	Means Motorsports	Chevrolet
30	90	B. J. McLeod	DGM Racing	Chevrolet
31	6	Ryan Vargas	JD Motorsports	Chevrolet
32	99	Jesse Iwuji (i)	B. J. McLeod Motorsports	Chevrolet
33	15	Colby Howard	JD Motorsports	Chevrolet
34	78	C. J. McLaughlin	B. J. McLeod Motorsports	Toyota
35	66	Chad Finchum	MBM Motorsports	Toyota
36	47	Kyle Weatherman	Mike Harmon Racing	Chevrolet
Official qualifying results

== Race ==
=== Race results ===
==== Stage Results ====
Stage One Laps: 45

Pos	No	Driver	Team	Manufacturer	Points
1	19	Brandon Jones	Joe Gibbs Racing	Toyota	10
2	7	Justin Allgaier	JR Motorsports	Chevrolet	9
3	18	Riley Herbst (R)	Joe Gibbs Racing	Toyota	8
4	51	Jeremy Clements	Jeremy Clements Racing	Chevrolet	7
5	10	Ross Chastain	Kaulig Racing	Chevrolet	6
6	22	Austin Cindric	Team Penske	Ford	5
7	11	Justin Haley	Kaulig Racing	Chevrolet	4
8	74	Bayley Currey (i)	Mike Harmon Racing	Chevrolet	0
9	39	Ryan Sieg	RSS Racing	Chevrolet	2
10	20	Harrison Burton	Joe Gibbs Racing	Toyota	1

Stage Two Laps: 45

Pos	No	Driver	Team	Manufacturer	Points
1	20	Harrison Burton	Joe Gibbs Racing	Toyota	10
2	7	Justin Allgaier	JR Motorsports	Chevrolet	9
3	9	Noah Gragson	JR Motorsports	Chevrolet	8
4	1	Michael Annett	JR Motorsports	Chevrolet	7
5	22	Austin Cindric	Team Penske	Ford	6
6	21	Anthony Alfredo (R)	Richard Childress Racing	Chevrolet	5
7	10	Ross Chastain	Kaulig Racing	Chevrolet	4
8	18	Riley Herbst (R)	Joe Gibbs Racing	Toyota	3
9	11	Justin Haley	Kaulig Racing	Chevrolet	2
10	19	Brandon Jones	Joe Gibbs Racing	Toyota	1

=== Final Stage Results ===
Laps: 110

Pos	Grid	No	Driver	Team	Manufacturer	Laps	Points	Status
1	12	20	Harrison Burton	Joe Gibbs Racing	Toyota	200	51	Running
2	9	9	Noah Gragson	JR Motorsports	Chevrolet	200	43	Running
3	18	21	Anthony Alfredo	Richard Childress Racing	Chevrolet	200	39	Running
4	7	22	Austin Cindric	Team Penske	Ford	200	44	Running
5	15	68	Brandon Brown	Brandonbilt Motorsports	Chevrolet	200	32	Running
6	10	1	Michael Annett	JR Motorsports	Chevrolet	200	38	Running
7	2	11	Justin Haley	Kaulig Racing	Chevrolet	200	36	Running
8	31	6	Ryan Vargas	JD Motorsports	Chevrolet	200	29	Running
9	13	92	Josh Williams	DGM Racing	Toyota	200	28	Running
10	17	44	Tommy Joe Martins	Martins Motorsports	Chevrolet	200	27	Running
11	20	36	Alex Labbè	DGM Racing	Chevrolet	200	26	Running
12	24	74	Bayley Currey (i)	Mike Harmon Racing	Chevrolet	200	0	Running
13	26	5	Matt Mills	B. J. McLeod Motorsports	Toyota	200	24	Running
14	11	02	Brett Moffitt (i)	Our Motorsports	Chevrolet	200	0	Running
15	27	4	Jesse Little (R)	JD Motorsports	Chevrolet	200	22	Running
16	6	10	Ross Chastain	Kaulig Racing	Chevrolet	200	21	Running
17	30	90	B. J. McLeod	DGM Racing	Chevrolet	199	20	Running
18	21	0	Jeffrey Earnhart	JD Motorsports	Chevrolet	197	19	Rear Gear
19	36	47	Kyle Weatherman	Mike Harmon Racing	Chevrolet	197	18	Running
20	34	78	C. J. McLaughlin	B. J. McLeod Motorsports	Chevrolet	197	17	Running
21	29	52	Kody Vanderwal (R)	Means Motorsports	Chevrolet	196	16	Running
22	28	08	Joe Graf Jr. (R)	SS-Green Light Racing	Chevrolet	194	15	Running
23	32	99	Jesse Iwuji (i)	B. J. McLeod Motorsports	Chevrolet	190	0	Running
24	1	98	Chase Briscoe	Stewart-Haas Racing	Ford	184	13	Running
25	3	19	Brandon Jones	Joe Gibbs Racing	Toyota	177	23	Accident
26	5	7	Justin Allgaier	JR Motorsports	Chevrolet	175	29	Accident
27	16	51	Jeremy Clements	Jeremy Clements Racing	Chevrolet	175	17	Accident
28	33	15	Colby Howard	JD Motorsports	Chevrolet	169	9	Accident
29	22	93	Myatt Snider (R)	RSS Racing	Chevrolet	168	8	Accident
30	8	8	Jeb Burton	JR Motorsports	Chevrolet	158	7	Accident
31	4	39	Ryan Sieg	RSS Racing	Chevrolet	136	8	Driveshaft
32	19	18	Riley Herbst (R)	Joe Gibbs Racing	Toyota	132	16	Accident
33	14	61	Austin Hill (i)	Hattori Racing Enterprises	Toyota	107	0	Suspension
34	35	66	Chad Finchum	MBM Motorsports	Toyota	55	3	Fuel Pump
35	23	07	David Starr	SS-Green Light Racing	Chevrolet	40	2	Engine
36	25	13	Timmy Hill (i)	MBM Motorsports	Toyota	6	0	Engine
Official race results

=== Race statistics ===
- Lead changes: 19 among 10 different drivers
- Cautions/Laps: 10 for 51
- Time of race: 2 hours, 35 minutes, and 21 seconds
- Average speed: 115.867 mph (186.470 km/h)

Previous race: 2020 Kansas Lottery 300	NASCAR Xfinity Series; 2020 season	Next race: 2020 Draft Top 250
