= Josh Williams (racing driver) =

American racing driver (born 1993)

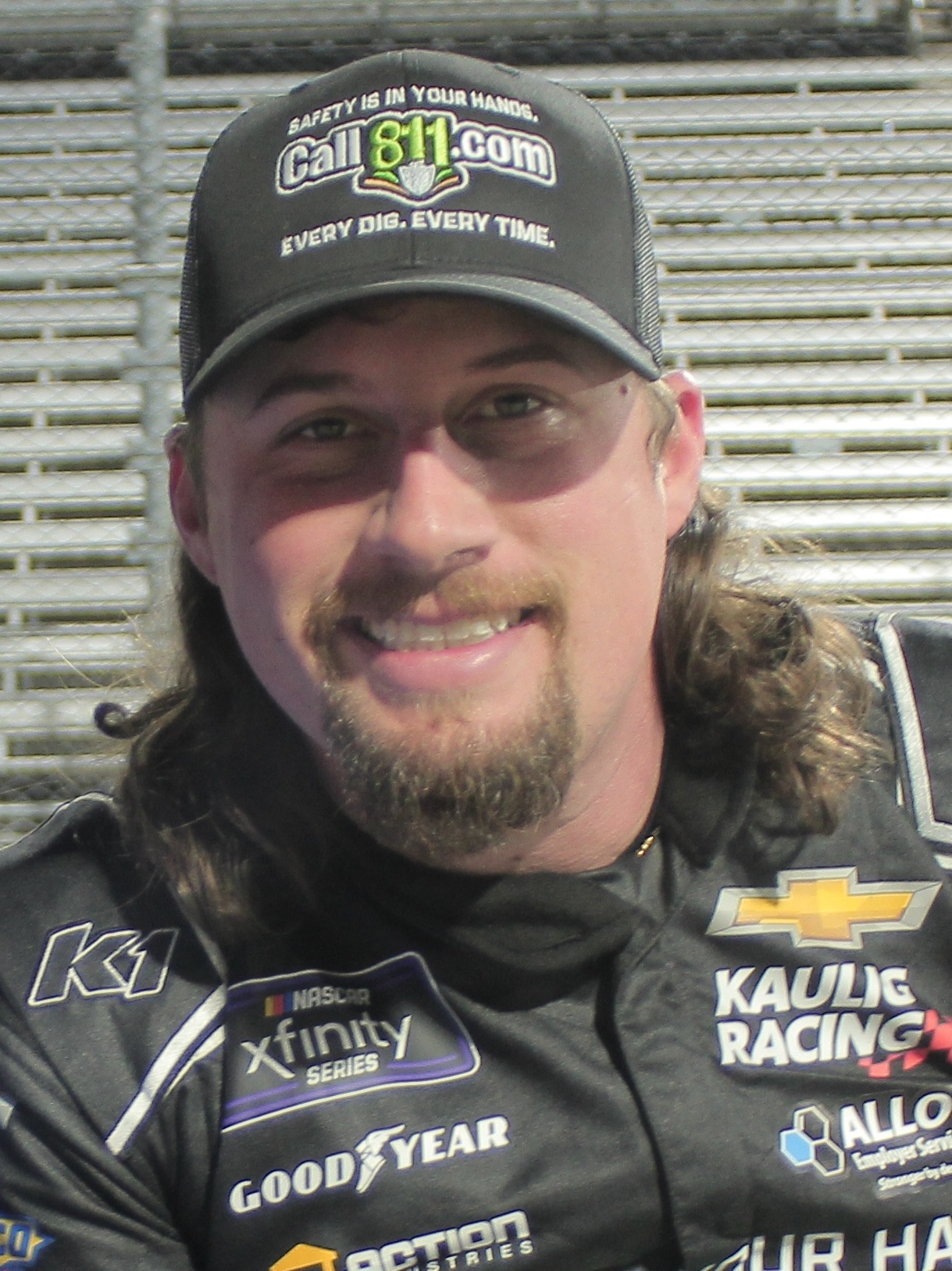
- Williams at Martinsville Speedway in 2024
- Born: Joshua Lee Williams; August 3, 1993 (age 33); Port Charlotte, Florida, U.S.
- Height: 5 ft 10 in (1.78 m)
- Weight: 192 lb (87 kg)

NASCAR Cup Series career
- 5 races run over 2 years
- 2024 position: 57th
- Best finish: 54th (2022)
- First race: 2022 Food City Dirt Race (Bristol Dirt)
- Last race: 2024 Cook Out 400 (Martinsville)
| Wins | Top tens | Poles |
|---|---|---|
| 0 | 0 | 0 |

NASCAR O'Reilly Auto Parts Series career
- 266 races run over 11 years
- Car no., team: No. 92 (DGM Racing with Jesse Iwuji Motorsports)
- 2026 position: 31st
- Best finish: 15th (2020)
- First race: 2016 Menards 250 (Michigan)
- Last race: 2026 O'Reilly Auto Parts 300 (Homestead)
| Wins | Top tens | Poles |
|---|---|---|
| 0 | 17 | 0 |

NASCAR FedEx Freight Truck Series career
- 2 races run over 2 years
- 2023 position: 109th
- Best finish: 84th (2014)
- First race: 2014 Kroger 250 (Martinsville)
- Last race: 2023 Tyson 250 (North Wilkesboro)
| Wins | Top tens | Poles |
|---|---|---|
| 0 | 0 | 0 |

ARCA Menards Series career
- 102 races run over 9 years
- Best finish: 3rd (2015)
- First race: 2010 Tire Kingdom 150 presented by Modspace (Palm Beach)
- Last race: 2018 General Tire 200 (Talladega)
- First win: 2016 Music City 200 (Nashville Fairgrounds)
- Last win: 2016 Montgomery Ward Fathers Day 200 (Madison)
| Wins | Top tens | Poles |
|---|---|---|
| 2 | 50 | 0 |
- Statistics up to date as of November 7, 2026.

Joshua Lee Williams (born August 3, 1993) is an American professional stock car racing driver and team owner. He competes part-time in the NASCAR O'Reilly Auto Parts Series, driving the No. 92 Chevrolet Camaro SS for DGM Racing with Jesse Iwuji Motorsports. He also owns Josh Williams Motorsports, which fields cars for development drivers in the ARCA Menards Series, Late Model Stock Cars, Legend Cars and Bandoleros.

== Racing career ==
=== Early years ===
Williams started his racing career in go-kart racing and later raced Fastrucks and Legends cars to advance his early career, eventually earning a berth in the 2009 edition of "Humpy's Heroes", a summer driver development program run by Humpy Wheeler for young drivers.

=== ARCA Racing Series ===
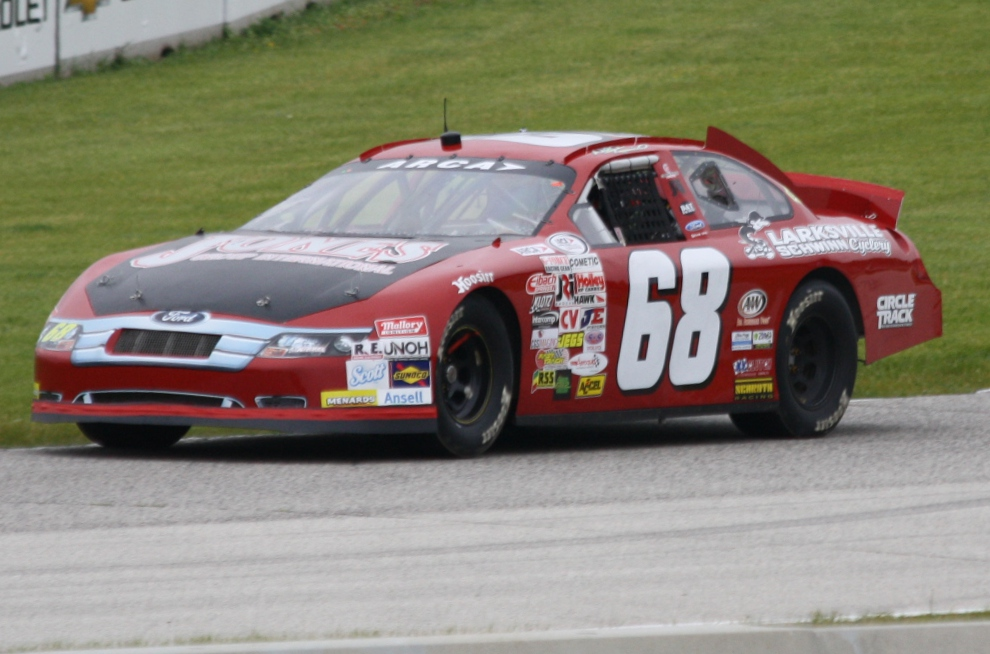
Williams' 2013 Kimmel ARCA car at Road America

Williams drove five races in the 2010 ARCA Racing Series in his family car, numbered 02. He recorded the best finish of 15th at Iowa Speedway. Williams caught the attention of those in the racing community with those performances, as he ran three races for Andy Belmont the following year and another three for his family team, which later developed an alliance with Lira Motorsports. Williams recorded two top-tens in Belmont's car and one more in his own car. For 2012, Williams took his Josh Williams Motorsports team full-time, running all but one race while having limited funding. He failed to finish three races and had four top tens with a best finish of seventh.

The 2013 season was a struggle, to begin with, for Williams, who remained sponsorless through the first five races of the season despite having two top-ten finishes. He then signed a four-race deal with Roulo Brothers Racing, making sporadic appearances in their Ford racecars. Running in between races for Roulo with his family team, Williams was signed by Frank Kimmel to drive one of his cars at Road America, starting and parking. Williams drove the next race for GMS Racing, again start and parking at Michigan International Speedway. Williams carried the sponsorship from Allegiant Air for the rest of the year, grabbing his first top-five finish (a second at Chicagoland Speedway). He finished fifth in points while utilizing four teams to get there.

Again hampered by limited funding, Williams scaled back to just over half the schedule in 2014, always running near or in the top ten. He scored another runner-up finish in the season's penultimate race. He raced the full season with the number six in 2015, except for one race with Cunningham Motorsports. He only finished outside of the top ten in five races and finished third in the driver's standings, behind Grant Enfinger and Austin Wayne Self, who passed Williams for second during the final race. 2016 brought new success for Williams, as he won his first two races, at Madison International Speedway and Nashville Fairgrounds Speedway. The Madison win came after he blew an engine in the previous contests and considered withdrawing from Madison; his crew pulled an all-nighter during the week to get the engine prepared. He finished fifth in points after an inconsistent season with eleven top tens.

Williams had said that he would have liked to run more ARCA Racing Series races in 2017. His team ran two races at the beginning of the season in a partnership with Lira Motorsports, and Williams himself went behind the wheel for the annual Salem Speedway throwback weekend, running fourth.

Williams returned once again in the 2018 season behind the wheel of the No. 6 Chevrolet at Talladega in a partnership between his own team and Our Motorsports. They finished in fifth place.

=== National series ===
Williams and family made one Camping World Truck Series start in a partnership with T3R2 Racing, falling out at Martinsville Speedway in 2014. He made two Xfinity Series starts as a start and park driver in 2016, one for Jimmy Means Racing and one for King Autosport. He was announced as the driver of King's No. 90 entry for the spring Bristol Motor Speedway Xfinity race on April 21, 2017. Longtime friend Mario Gosselin helped Williams get the ride. Along with the Bristol race, Williams wanted to run about six Truck races for his family team in 2017. The Truck races never came, but Williams garnered six other starts split between King's 90 and 92 cars, mostly starting and parking in the 92 and running full races in the 90. At Daytona in the summer, Williams was running just outside the top ten before he was clipped by Daniel Suárez, finishing last. Williams broke the top thirty in all of his full races.

For 2018, Williams took over the majority of the races in the No. 90 and served as crew chief for drivers of the 90 like Donald Theetge and Andy Lally most weekends when he was not in the seat.

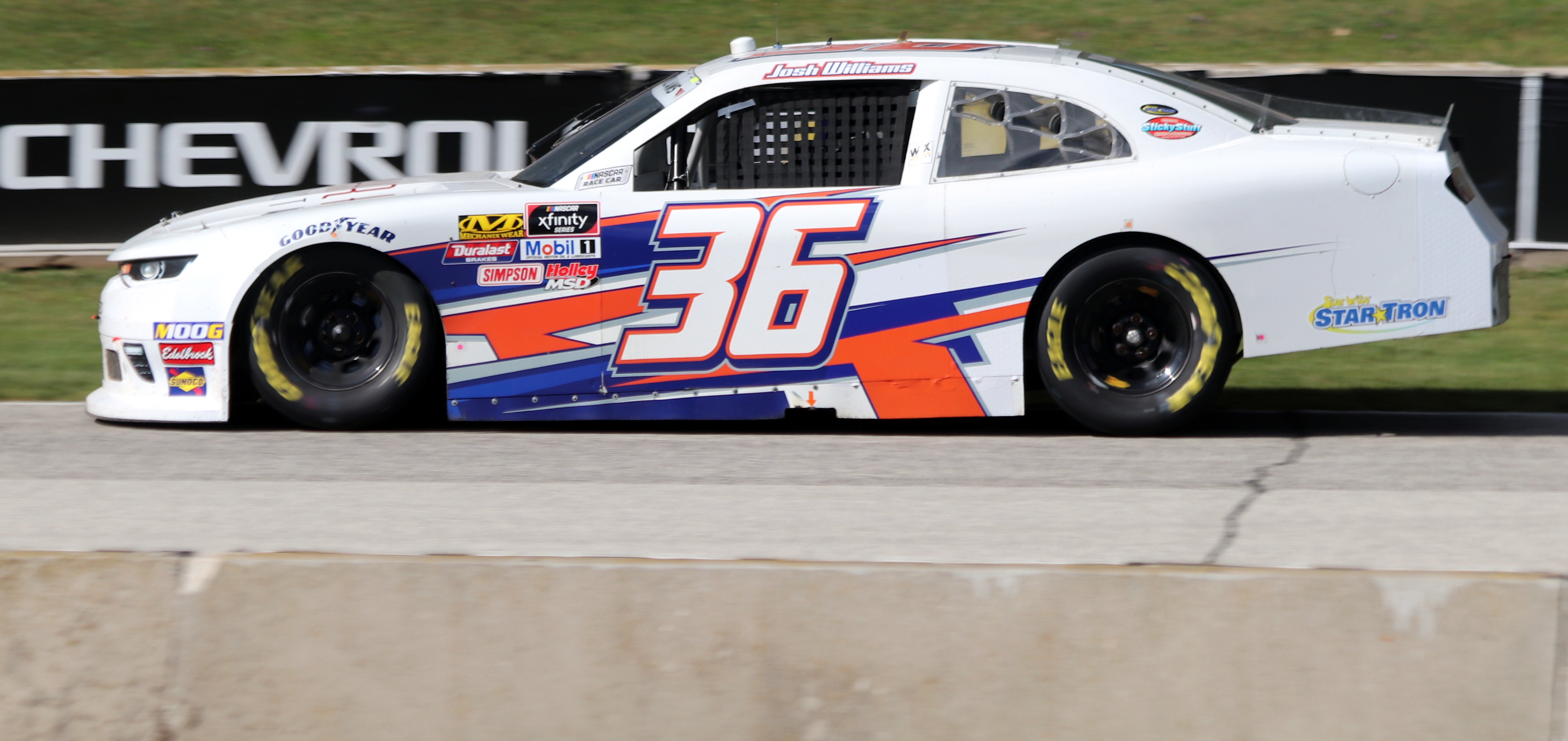
Williams' 2019 ride in the No. 36

On January 29, 2019, it was announced that Williams would move over to DGM's No. 36 car for the 2019 NASCAR Xfinity Series season. After gambling on pit strategy, Williams finished a then-career-best sixteenth in the Boyd Gaming 300 in early March. He later improved on that career-best with his first career top-ten, an eighth at Talladega Superspeedway in the spring. The finish helped Williams and DGM bounce back from a sponsor who failed to pay the team in the beginning portions of the year.

Williams returned to DGM in 2020, piloting the team's No. 92 entry. He reeled off two top-ten finishes in the month of October, including a career-best sixth-place finish at Kansas Speedway that came only a day after the death of one of Williams' employees. On October 31, Williams and the team confirmed another full-season effort in 2021. Following the 2021 season, Williams and DGM parted, with Williams taking an opportunity that would help him pursue racing on Sundays.

Williams moved to the No. 78 in 2022, driving for B. J. McLeod Motorsports.

Williams made his first career NASCAR Cup Series start at the 2022 Food City Dirt Race, and would drive the No. 78 for Live Fast Motorsports.

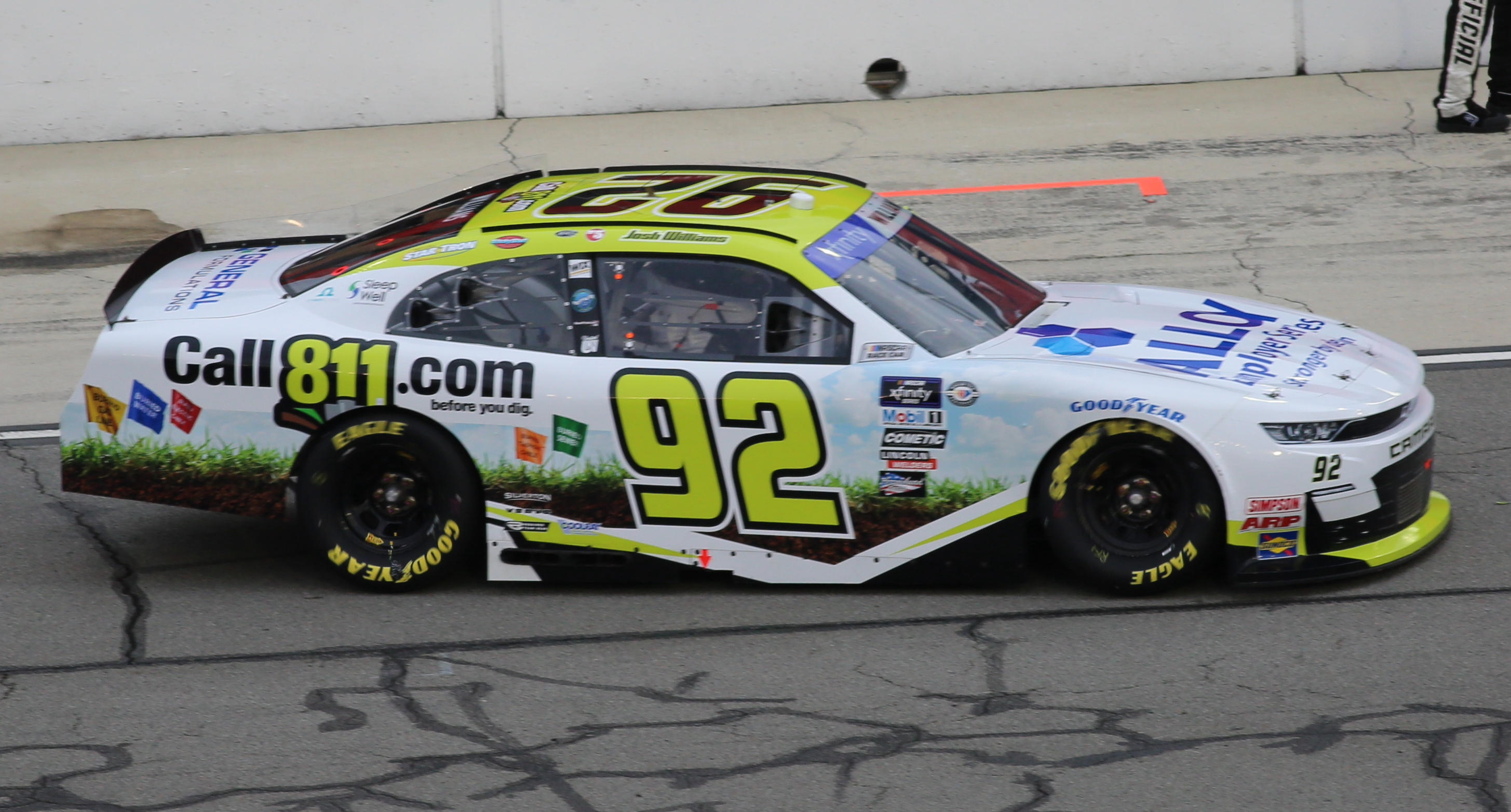
Williams at Auto Club Speedway in 2023

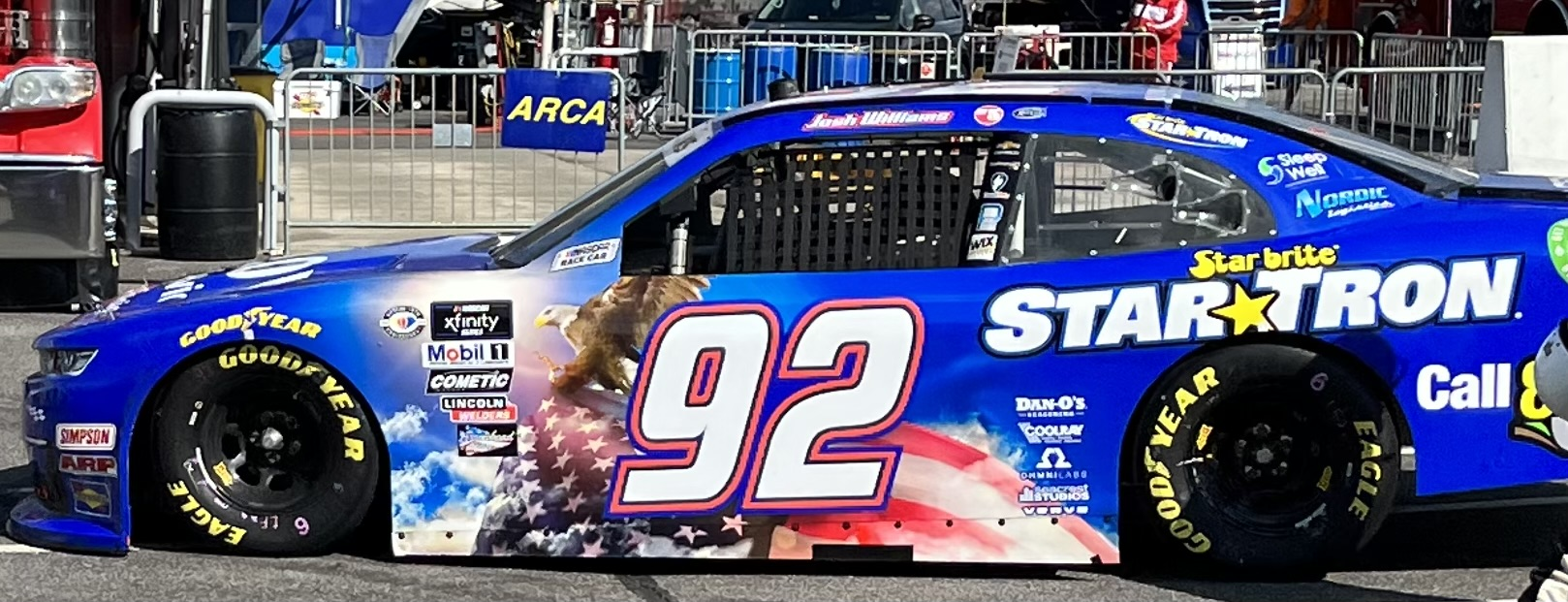
Williams at Pocono Raceway in 2023

On August 22, 2022, Williams announced that he would be returning to his old No. 92 for DGM. He would drive that car as well as the team's No. 36 car for the rest of 2022. In 2023, Williams returned to the No. 92 car full-time. At Atlanta, he sustained heavy damage on lap 27; when debris from his repaired car caused another caution, NASCAR parked him under a provision in the Damaged Vehicle Policy. In response, Williams stopped his car on the start/finish line and walked back to pit road. On March 21, he was suspended for the COTA race for his actions.

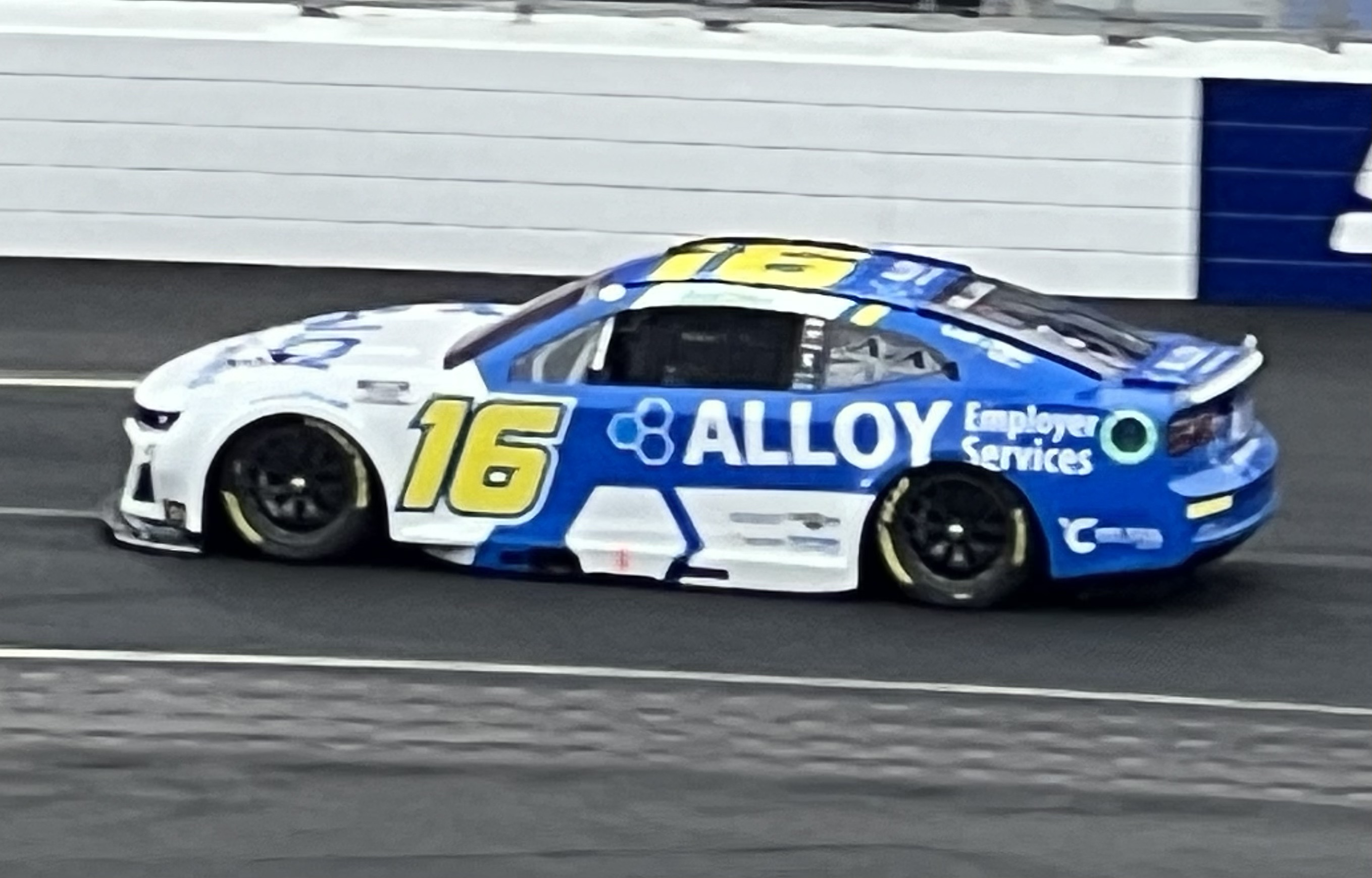
Williams' No. 16 car at the Los Angeles Coliseum in 2024

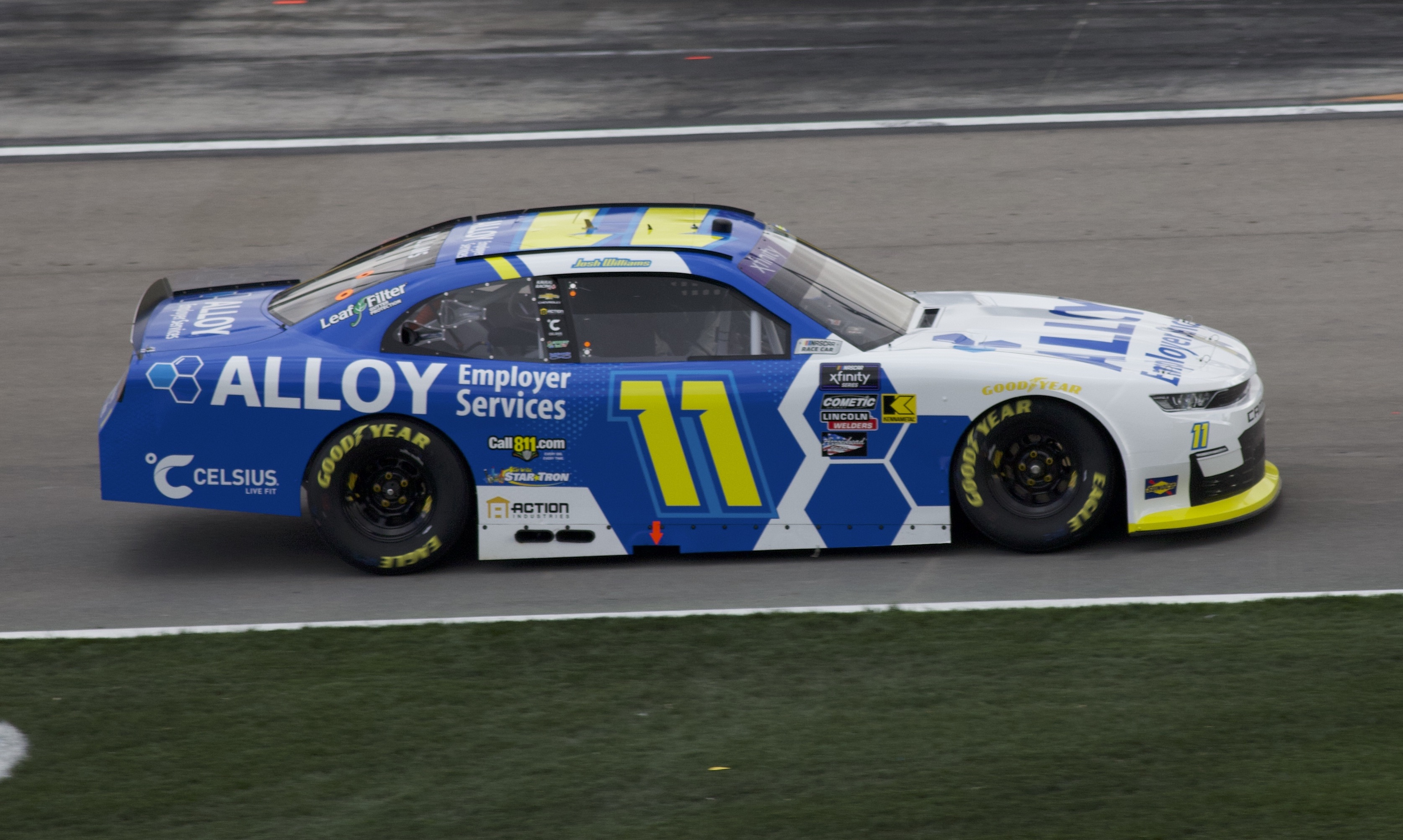
Williams' No. 11 car at Las Vegas Motor Speedway in 2024.

Williams would drive the No. 11 car for Kaulig Racing in the 2024 season. Williams struggled throughout the season and only scored four top-ten finishes, with a best of seventh at Portland. He finished the season in eighteenth in the final points standings.

On July 30, 2025, it was announced that Williams had been released from Kaulig for the remainder of the season. At the time, Williams was nineteenth in the standings with two top-ten finishes. On August 15, Alpha Prime Racing announced that Williams would compete in four races for the team, starting with the summer Daytona race. On August 25, DGM announced that Williams would return to their team again for the Portland race. Despite missing three races, Williams finished the season in 23rd in the final points standings.

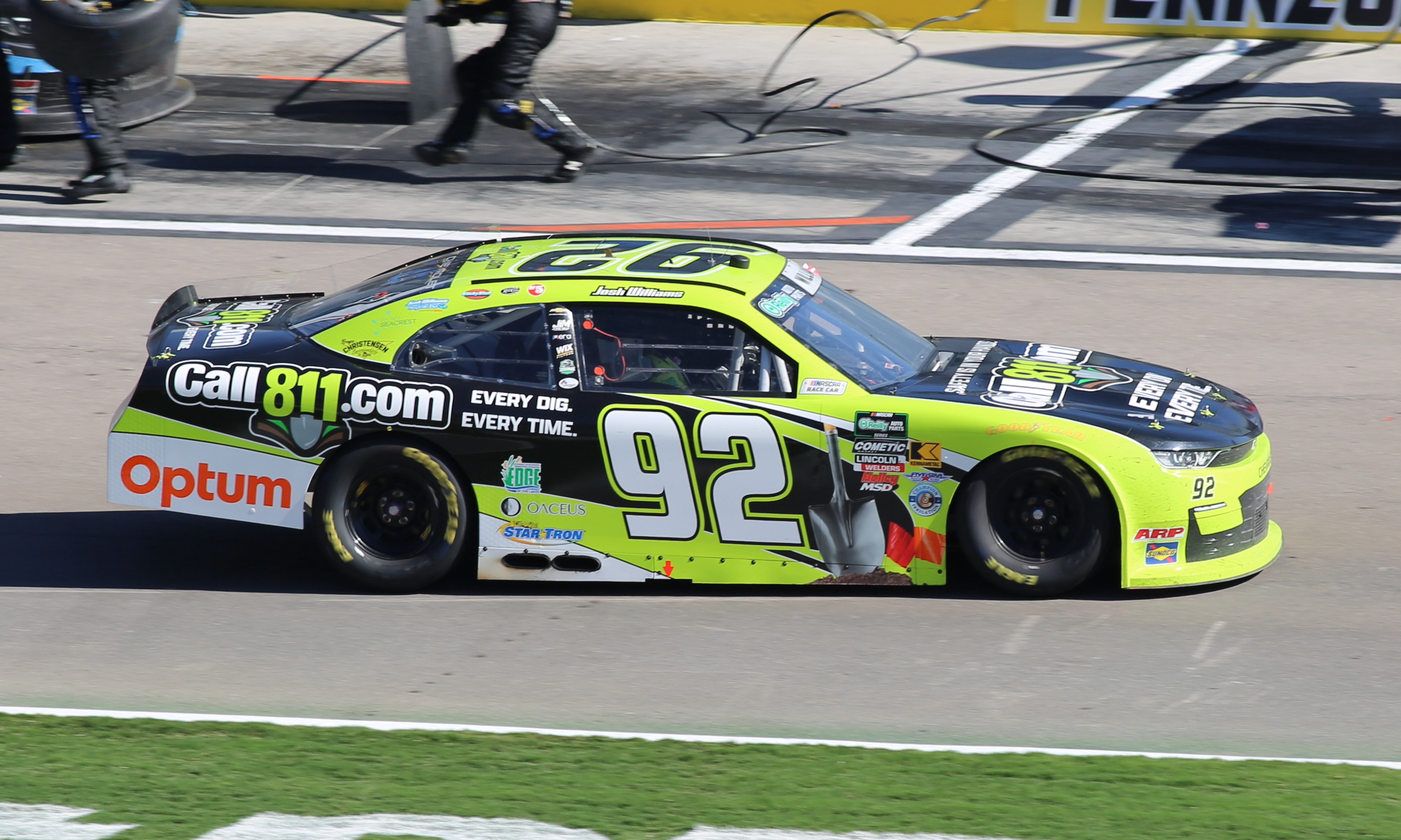
Williams' No. 92 car at Las Vegas Motor Speedway in 2026

On November 14, 2025, DGM announced that Williams would yet again return to the team in 2026 to drive the No. 92 on a multi-year agreement.

== Personal life ==
Williams was born in Florida but moved to the Charlotte area at age 15, taking online classes to get through high school while racing. As a teen, Williams was injured in a head-on four-wheeler collision and spent five days in the ICU. Williams visits children's hospitals to give back to the community in his free time. Williams, with his wife Trazia Rae, owns a company that prepares foreclosed homes for auction, which he works at during the week while racing. His wife is a social media influencer, and they have one daughter together. Williams is also known to visit children's hospitals during race weekends.

== Motorsports career results ==
=== NASCAR ===
(key) (Bold – Pole position awarded by qualifying time. Italics – Pole position earned by points standings or practice time. * – Most laps led.)

==== Cup Series ====
NASCAR Cup Series results
| Year | Team | No. | Make | 1 | 2 | 3 | 4 | 5 | 6 | 7 | 8 | 9 | 10 | 11 | 12 | 13 | 14 | 15 | 16 | 17 | 18 | 19 | 20 | 21 | 22 | 23 | 24 | 25 | 26 | 27 | 28 | 29 | 30 | 31 | 32 | 33 | 34 | 35 | 36 | NCSC | Pts | Ref |
|---|---|---|---|---|---|---|---|---|---|---|---|---|---|---|---|---|---|---|---|---|---|---|---|---|---|---|---|---|---|---|---|---|---|---|---|---|---|---|---|---|---|---|
| 2022 | Live Fast Motorsports | 78 | Ford | DAY | CAL | LVS | PHO | ATL | COA | RCH | MAR | BRD; 25 | TAL | DOV | DAR | KAN | CLT | GTW | SON | NSH | ROA | ATL | NHA | POC | IRC; 25 | MCH | RCH | GLN | DAY | DAR | KAN | BRI | TEX | TAL | ROV; 31 | LVS | HOM | MAR | PHO | 54th | 0^{1} | |
| 2024 | Kaulig Racing | 16 | Chevy | DAY | ATL; 37 | LVS | PHO | BRI | COA | RCH | MAR; 27 | TEX | TAL | DOV | KAN | DAR | CLT | GTW | SON | IOW | NHA | NSH | CSC | POC | IND | RCH | MCH | DAY | DAR | ATL | GLN | BRI | KAN | TAL | ROV | LVS | HOM | MAR | PHO | 57th | 0^{1} | |

==== O'Reilly Auto Parts Series ====
NASCAR O'Reilly Auto Parts Series results
| Year | Team | No. | Make | 1 | 2 | 3 | 4 | 5 | 6 | 7 | 8 | 9 | 10 | 11 | 12 | 13 | 14 | 15 | 16 | 17 | 18 | 19 | 20 | 21 | 22 | 23 | 24 | 25 | 26 | 27 | 28 | 29 | 30 | 31 | 32 | 33 | NOAPSC | Pts | Ref |
|---|---|---|---|---|---|---|---|---|---|---|---|---|---|---|---|---|---|---|---|---|---|---|---|---|---|---|---|---|---|---|---|---|---|---|---|---|---|---|---|
| 2016 | Jimmy Means Racing | 79 | Chevy | DAY | ATL | LVS | PHO | CAL | TEX | BRI | RCH | TAL | DOV | CLT | POC | MCH; 38 | IOW | DAY | KEN | | | | | | | | | | | | | | | | | | 80th | 4 | |
| 2016 | King Autosport | 92 | Chevy | | | | | | | | | | | | | | | | | NHA; DNQ | IND | IOW | GLN | MOH | BRI | ROA | DAR | RCH | CHI | KEN; 37 | DOV | CLT | KAN | TEX | PHO | HOM | 80th | 4 | |
| 2017 | King Autosport | 90 | Chevy | DAY | ATL | LVS | PHO | CAL | TEX | BRI; 22 | RCH | TAL | CLT | DOV | POC; 28 | | | | | | | | | | | | | | | KEN; 26 | DOV | CLT | KAN | | | HOM; 28 | 46th | 53 | |
| 2017 | King Autosport | 92 | Chevy | | | | | | | | | | | | | MCH; 34 | IOW | DAY; 40 | KEN | NHA | IND | IOW | GLN | MOH | BRI | ROA | DAR | RCH | CHI | | | | | TEX; 34 | PHO | | 46th | 53 | |
| 2018 | DGM Racing | 90 | Chevy | DAY; 22 | ATL; 24 | LVS; 21 | PHO; 29 | CAL; 25 | TEX; 30 | BRI; 22 | RCH | TAL; 26 | DOV | CLT; 38 | POC; 21 | MCH; 32 | IOW; 34 | CHI; 31 | DAY; 24 | KEN; 35 | NHA | IOW; 24 | GLN | MOH | BRI; 28 | ROA | DAR | IND; 24 | LVS; 20 | RCH | ROV | DOV | KAN; 24 | TEX | PHO | | 32nd | 208 | |
| 2018 | DGM Racing | 92 | Chevy | | | | | | | | | | | | | | | | | | | | | | | | | | | | | | | | | HOM; DNQ | 32nd | 208 | |
| 2019 | DGM Racing | 36 | Chevy | DAY; 22 | ATL; 21 | LVS; 16 | PHO; 29 | CAL; 33 | TEX; 14 | BRI; 19 | | TAL; 8 | DOV; 22 | CLT; 27 | POC; 15 | MCH; 23 | IOW; 17 | CHI; 26 | DAY; 28 | KEN; 18 | NHA; 19 | IOW; 15 | GLN; 19 | MOH; 22 | BRI; 30 | ROA; 31 | DAR; 24 | IND; 17 | LVS; 18 | RCH; 23 | ROV; 20 | DOV; 15 | KAN; 21 | TEX; 14 | PHO; 15 | HOM; 19 | 17th | 527 | |
| 2019 | DGM Racing | 92 | Chevy | | | | | | | | RCH; DNQ | | | | | | | | | | | | | | | | | | | | | | | | | | 17th | 527 | |
| 2020 | DGM Racing | 92 | Chevy | DAY; 26 | LVS; 13 | CAL; 10 | PHO; 16 | DAR; 16 | CLT; 14 | BRI; 9 | ATL; 28 | HOM; 20 | HOM; 12 | TAL; 33 | POC; 34 | IRC; 22 | KEN; 26 | KEN; 15 | TEX; 22 | KAN; 20 | ROA; 13 | DRC; 24 | DOV; 24 | DOV; 22 | DAY; 9 | DAR; 15 | RCH; 22 | RCH; 25 | BRI; 19 | LVS; 18 | TAL; 7 | ROV; 34 | KAN; 6 | TEX; 9 | MAR; 19 | PHO; 13 | 15th | 609 | |
| 2021 | DGM Racing | 92 | Chevy | DAY; 21 | DRC; 17 | HOM; 26 | LVS; 16 | PHO; 21 | ATL; 16 | MAR; 16 | TAL; 28 | DAR; 39 | DOV; 38 | COA; DNQ | CLT; 21 | MOH; 10 | TEX; 17 | NSH; 21 | POC; 40 | ROA; 17 | ATL; 18 | NHA; 22 | GLN; 14 | IRC; 15 | MCH; 18 | DAY; 17 | DAR; 15 | RCH; 23 | BRI; 20 | LVS; 24 | TAL; 14 | ROV; 11 | TEX; 19 | KAN; 26 | MAR; 11 | PHO; 32 | 18th | 531 | |
| 2022 | B. J. McLeod Motorsports | 78 | Chevy | DAY; 31 | CAL; 21 | LVS; DNQ | PHO; 35 | ATL; 22 | COA; DNQ | RCH; 27 | MAR; DNQ | TAL; 19 | DOV; 25 | DAR; 34 | TEX; 20 | CLT; 27 | PIR; 22 | NSH; 34 | ROA; 17 | ATL; 25 | | POC; 21 | IRC; DNQ | | | | | | | | | | | | | | 25th | 314 | |
| 2022 | B. J. McLeod Motorsports | 5 | Chevy | | | | | | | | | | | | | | | | | | NHA; 24 | | | MCH; 36 | GLN | | | | | | | | | | | | 25th | 314 | |
| 2022 | DGM Racing | 92 | Chevy | | | | | | | | | | | | | | | | | | | | | | | DAY; DNQ | | | BRI; 21 | | | ROV; 37 | | | MAR; 22 | | 25th | 314 | |
| 2022 | B. J. McLeod Motorsports with Emerling-Gase Motorsports | 5 | Ford | | | | | | | | | | | | | | | | | | | | | | | DAY; 29 | | | | | | | | | | | 25th | 314 | |
| 2022 | DGM Racing | 36 | Chevy | | | | | | | | | | | | | | | | | | | | | | | | DAR; 26 | KAN; 24 | | TEX; 26 | TAL; 19 | | LVS; 34 | HOM; 30 | | PHO; 15 | 25th | 314 | |
| 2023 | DGM Racing | 92 | Chevy | DAY; 15 | CAL; 16 | LVS; 30 | PHO; 21 | ATL; 32 | COA | RCH; 33 | MAR; 19 | TAL; 10 | DOV; 23 | DAR; 17 | CLT; 18 | PIR; 16 | SON; 35 | NSH; 33 | CSC; 36 | ATL; 9 | NHA; 8 | POC; 36 | ROA; 21 | MCH; 22 | IRC; 33 | GLN; 36 | DAY; 27 | DAR; 37 | KAN; 13 | BRI; 20 | TEX; 20 | ROV; 20 | LVS; 33 | HOM; 17 | MAR; 14 | PHO; 25 | 21st | 446 | |
| 2024 | Kaulig Racing | 11 | Chevy | DAY; 34 | ATL; 37 | LVS; 14 | PHO; 27 | COA; 38 | RCH; 12 | MAR; 10 | TEX; 12 | TAL; 20 | DOV; 25 | DAR; 21 | CLT; 8 | PIR; 7 | SON; 37 | IOW; 20 | NHA; 23 | NSH; 24 | CSC; 12 | POC; 18 | IND; 36 | MCH; 19 | DAY; 11 | DAR; 16 | ATL; 8 | GLN; 32 | BRI; 21 | KAN; 11 | TAL; 34 | ROV; 36 | LVS; 15 | HOM; 27 | MAR; 17 | PHO; 33 | 18th | 515 | |
| 2025 | Kaulig Racing | 11 | Chevy | DAY; 20 | ATL; 15 | COA; 15 | PHO; 12 | LVS; 29 | HOM; 19 | MAR; 17 | DAR; 36 | BRI; 14 | CAR; 7 | TAL; 29 | TEX; 37 | CLT; 6 | NSH; 17 | MXC; 20 | POC; 15 | ATL; 38 | CSC; 11 | SON; 15 | DOV; 27 | IND; 22 | IOW | GLN | | | | | | | | | | | 23rd | 474 | |
| 2025 | Alpha Prime Racing | 45 | Chevy | | | | | | | | | | | | | | | | | | | | | | | | DAY; 34 | | | BRI; 28 | | ROV; 37 | | TAL; 14 | MAR; 28 | PHO; 26 | 23rd | 474 | |
| 2025 | DGM Racing with Jesse Iwuji Motorsports | 91 | Chevy | | | | | | | | | | | | | | | | | | | | | | | | | PIR; 23 | GTW | | KAN; 24 | | LVS; 23 | | | | 23rd | 474 | |
| 2026 | DGM Racing with Jesse Iwuji Motorsports | 92 | Chevy | DAY; 34 | ATL; 27 | COA; DNQ | PHO; DNQ | LVS; 16 | DAR; 24 | MAR; 32 | CAR; 19 | BRI; 29 | KAN; 17 | TAL; 35 | TEX; 18 | GLN; Wth | DOV | CLT | NSH | POC | COR | SON; 27 | CHI | ATL | IND | IOW | DAY; 11 | DAR | GTW; 18 | BRI; 28 | LVS; 28 | CLT | PHO; 26 | TAL; 23 | MAR | HOM; 20 | 31st | 234 | |

==== Craftsman Truck Series ====
NASCAR Craftsman Truck Series results
| Year | Team | No. | Make | 1 | 2 | 3 | 4 | 5 | 6 | 7 | 8 | 9 | 10 | 11 | 12 | 13 | 14 | 15 | 16 | 17 | 18 | 19 | 20 | 21 | 22 | 23 | NCTC | Pts | Ref |
|---|---|---|---|---|---|---|---|---|---|---|---|---|---|---|---|---|---|---|---|---|---|---|---|---|---|---|---|---|---|
| 2014 | Josh Williams Motorsports | 66 | Ford | DAY | MAR; 34 | KAN | CLT | DOV | TEX | GTW | KEN | IOW | ELD | POC | MCH | BRI | MSP | CHI | NHA | LVS | TAL | MAR | TEX | PHO | HOM | | 84th | 10 | |
| 2023 | AM Racing | 22 | Ford | DAY | LVS | ATL | COA | TEX | BRD | MAR | KAN | DAR | NWS; 28 | CLT | GTW | NSH | MOH | POC | RCH | IRP | MLW | KAN | BRI | TAL | HOM | PHO | 109th | 0^{1} | |

^{*} Season still in progress
^{1} Ineligible for series points

=== ARCA Racing Series ===
(key) (Bold – Pole position awarded by qualifying time. Italics – Pole position earned by points standings or practice time. * – Most laps led.)

ARCA Racing Series results
| Year | Team | No. | Make | 1 | 2 | 3 | 4 | 5 | 6 | 7 | 8 | 9 | 10 | 11 | 12 | 13 | 14 | 15 | 16 | 17 | 18 | 19 | 20 | 21 | ARSC | Pts | Ref |
|---|---|---|---|---|---|---|---|---|---|---|---|---|---|---|---|---|---|---|---|---|---|---|---|---|---|---|---|
| 2010 | Josh Williams Motorsports | 02 | Ford | DAY | PBE; 20 | SLM | TEX | TAL | TOL; 26 | POC | MCH | IOW; 15 | MFD | POC | BLN | NJE; 25 | ISF | CHI | DSF | TOL | SLM | KAN | CAR; 24 | | 42nd | 600 | |
| 2011 | Andy Belmont Racing | 14 | Chevy | DAY | TAL | SLM; 6 | TOL; 12 | NJE; 7 | CHI | POC | MCH | WIN | BLN | | | | | | | | | | | | 27th | 990 | |
| 2011 | Josh Williams Motorsports | 02 | Ford | | | | | | | | | | | IOW; 32 | IRP; 8 | POC | ISF | MAD | DSF | SLM | KAN | TOL; 14 | | | 27th | 990 | |
| 2012 | Josh Williams Motorsports | 02 | Ford | DAY; 33 | MOB; 20 | | TAL; 12 | TOL; 13 | ELK | POC; 10 | | | NJE; 22 | IOW; 32 | CHI; 20 | IRP; 13 | POC; 21 | BLN; 17 | | MAD; 7 | | DSF; C | KAN; 13 | | 9th | 3285 | |
| 2012 | Josh Williams Motorsports | 02 | Chevy | | | SLM; 9 | | | | | MCH; 29 | WIN; 10 | | | | | | | ISF; 18 | | SLM; 22 | | | | 9th | 3285 | |
| 2013 | Josh Williams Motorsports | 02 | Ford | DAY; 15 | MOB; 26 | | TAL; 6 | TOL; 8 | | POC; 10 | MCH; 16 | | | CHI; 2 | NJE; 12 | POC; 13 | | | | | | | | | 5th | 4825 | |
| 2013 | Josh Williams Motorsports | 02 | Chevy | | | SLM; 19 | | | | | | | | | | | | | MAD; 8 | | IOW; 12 | SLM; 6 | KEN; 15 | KAN; 10 | 5th | 4825 | |
| 2013 | Roulo Brothers Racing | 17 | Ford | | | | | | ELK; 6 | | | | | | | | | | | | | | | | 5th | 4825 | |
| 2013 | Kimmel Racing | 68 | Ford | | | | | | | | | ROA; 23 | | | | | | | | | | | | | 5th | 4825 | |
| 2013 | GMS Racing | 23 | Chevy | | | | | | | | | | WIN; 17 | | | | | | | | | | | | 5th | 4825 | |
| 2013 | Roulo Brothers Racing | 99 | Ford | | | | | | | | | | | | | | BLN; 9 | ISF; 10 | | DSF; 13 | | | | | 5th | 4825 | |
| 2014 | Josh Williams Motorsports | 6 | Chevy | DAY | MOB | SLM; 6 | | TOL; 11 | NJE; 11 | POC; 6 | MCH; 10 | | | CHI; 11 | IRP | POC | BLN | ISF | MAD | DSF | SLM | KEN; 13 | KAN; 2 | | 13th | 2280 | |
| 2014 | Josh Williams Motorsports | 6 | Ford | | | | TAL; 11 | | | | | ELK; 6 | WIN; 14 | | | | | | | | | | | | 13th | 2280 | |
| 2015 | Josh Williams Motorsports | 6 | Ford | DAY; 9 | | | SLM; 19 | TAL; 18 | | | | | | | | | | | | | | | | | 3rd | 4650 | |
| 2015 | Josh Williams Motorsports | 6 | Chevy | | MOB; 3 | NSH; 7 | | | TOL; 3 | NJE; 3 | POC; 7 | MCH; 6 | | WIN; 7 | IOW; 22 | IRP; 6 | POC; 5 | BLN; 6 | ISF; 4 | DSF; 4 | SLM; 8 | KEN; 24 | KAN; 26 | | 3rd | 4650 | |
| 2015 | Cunningham Motorsports | 22 | Dodge | | | | | | | | | | CHI; 7 | | | | | | | | | | | | 3rd | 4650 | |
| 2016 | Josh Williams Motorsports | 6 | Ford | DAY; 19 | | | TAL; 2 | | | | | | | | | | | | | | | | | | 4th | 4175 | |
| 2016 | Josh Williams Motorsports | 6 | Chevy | | NSH; 1 | SLM; 13 | | TOL; 6 | NJE; 6 | POC; 11 | MCH; 20 | MAD; 1 | WIN; 6 | IOW; 10 | IRP; 4 | POC; 26 | BLN; 10 | ISF; 16 | DSF | SLM; 4 | CHI; 26 | KEN; 6 | KAN; 13 | | 4th | 4175 | |
| 2017 | Josh Williams Motorsports | 31 | Chevy | DAY | NSH | SLM | TAL | TOL | ELK | POC | MCH | MAD | IOW | IRP | POC | WIN | ISF | ROA | DSF | SLM; 4 | CHI | KEN | KAN | | 77th | 210 | |
| 2018 | Our Motorsports | 6 | Chevy | DAY | NSH | SLM | TAL; 5 | TOL | CLT | POC | MCH | MAD | GTW | CHI | IOW | ELK | POC | ISF | BLN | DSF | SLM | IRP | KAN | | 76th | 205 | |
