= 2022 Food City Dirt Race =

NASCAR Cup Series race

Race details
- Race 9 of 36 in the 2022 NASCAR Cup Series
- The 2022 Food City Dirt Race program cover.
- Date: April 17, 2022
- Location: Bristol Motor Speedway in Bristol, Tennessee
- Course: Permanent racing facility
- Course length: 0.533 miles (0.858 km)
- Distance: 250 laps, 133.25 mi (214.445 km)
- Average speed: 34.973 miles per hour (56.284 km/h)

Pole position
Driver	Cole Custer	Stewart-Haas Racing
- Time: 16 Heat Race Points

Most laps led
Driver	Tyler Reddick	Richard Childress Racing
- Laps: 99

Winner
No. 18	Kyle Busch	Joe Gibbs Racing

Television in the United States
- Network: Fox
- Announcers: Mike Joy, Clint Bowyer, and Darrell Waltrip
- Nielsen ratings: 2.19, 4,007,000 viewers

Radio in the United States
- Radio: PRN
- Booth announcers: Doug Rice and Mark Garrow
- Turn announcers: Rob Albright (Backstretch)

The 2022 Food City Dirt Race was a NASCAR Cup Series race held on April 17, 2022, at Bristol Motor Speedway in Bristol, Tennessee. Contested over 250 laps on the 0.533 miles (0.858 km) short track, it was the ninth race of the 2022 NASCAR Cup Series season. Kyle Busch won the race in a last lap pass from 3rd after both Tyler Reddick and Chase Briscoe both spun battling for the lead. This would turn out to be Busch's last win for Joe Gibbs Racing and the last appearance of the 18 car in victory lane.

== Report ==
The layout of Bristol Motor Speedway, the venue where the race was held

=== Background ===
Bristol Motor Speedway, formerly known as Bristol International Raceway and Bristol Raceway, is a NASCAR short track venue located in Bristol, Tennessee. Constructed in 1960, it held its first NASCAR race on July 30, 1961. Bristol is among the most popular tracks on the NASCAR schedule because of its distinct features, which include extraordinarily steep banking combined with short length, an all concrete surface, two pit roads, and stadium-like seating.

In 2021, the race shifted to a dirt surface version of the track and was renamed the Food City Dirt Race.

==== Entry list ====
- (R) denotes rookie driver.
- (i) denotes driver who is ineligible for series driver points.

No.	Driver	Team	Manufacturer
1	Ross Chastain	Trackhouse Racing Team	Chevrolet
2	Austin Cindric (R)	Team Penske	Ford
3	Austin Dillon	Richard Childress Racing	Chevrolet
4	Kevin Harvick	Stewart-Haas Racing	Ford
5	Kyle Larson	Hendrick Motorsports	Chevrolet
6	Brad Keselowski	RFK Racing	Ford
7	Corey LaJoie	Spire Motorsports	Chevrolet
8	Tyler Reddick	Richard Childress Racing	Chevrolet
9	Chase Elliott	Hendrick Motorsports	Chevrolet
10	Aric Almirola	Stewart-Haas Racing	Ford
11	Denny Hamlin	Joe Gibbs Racing	Toyota
12	Ryan Blaney	Team Penske	Ford
14	Chase Briscoe	Stewart-Haas Racing	Ford
15	J. J. Yeley (i)	Rick Ware Racing	Ford
16	Noah Gragson (i)	Kaulig Racing	Chevrolet
17	Chris Buescher	RFK Racing	Ford
18	Kyle Busch	Joe Gibbs Racing	Toyota
19	Martin Truex Jr.	Joe Gibbs Racing	Toyota
20	Christopher Bell	Joe Gibbs Racing	Toyota
21	Harrison Burton (R)	Wood Brothers Racing	Ford
22	Joey Logano	Team Penske	Ford
23	Bubba Wallace	23XI Racing	Toyota
24	William Byron	Hendrick Motorsports	Chevrolet
31	Justin Haley	Kaulig Racing	Chevrolet
34	Michael McDowell	Front Row Motorsports	Ford
38	Todd Gilliland (R)	Front Row Motorsports	Ford
41	Cole Custer	Stewart-Haas Racing	Ford
42	Ty Dillon	Petty GMS Motorsports	Chevrolet
43	Erik Jones	Petty GMS Motorsports	Chevrolet
45	Kurt Busch	23XI Racing	Toyota
47	Ricky Stenhouse Jr.	JTG Daugherty Racing	Chevrolet
48	Alex Bowman	Hendrick Motorsports	Chevrolet
51	Cody Ware	Rick Ware Racing	Ford
77	Justin Allgaier (i)	Spire Motorsports	Chevrolet
78	Josh Williams (i)	Live Fast Motorsports	Ford
99	Daniel Suárez	Trackhouse Racing Team	Chevrolet
Official entry list

== Practice ==
=== First practice ===
Tyler Reddick was the fastest in the first practice session with a time of 20.017 seconds and a speed of 89.924 mph (144.719 km/h).

Pos	No.	Driver	Team	Manufacturer	Time	Speed
1	8	Tyler Reddick	Richard Childress Racing	Chevrolet	20.017	89.924
2	14	Chase Briscoe	Stewart-Haas Racing	Ford	20.055	89.753
3	18	Kyle Busch	Joe Gibbs Racing	Toyota	20.068	89.695
Official first practice results

=== Final practice ===
Denny Hamlin was the fastest in the final practice session with a time of 20.638 seconds and a speed of 87.218 mph (140.364 km/h).

Pos	No.	Driver	Team	Manufacturer	Time	Speed
1	11	Denny Hamlin	Joe Gibbs Racing	Toyota	20.638	87.218
2	18	Kyle Busch	Joe Gibbs Racing	Toyota	20.668	87.091
3	38	Todd Gilliland (R)	Front Row Motorsports	Ford	20.683	87.028
Official final practice results

== Qualifying heat races ==
Qualifying race procedure similar to that used by the Chili Bowl qualifying nights and Bryan Clauson Classic. Starting order for heat races based on random draw. Grid determined by a combination of passing points and finishing points. Ties broken by owner points.

=== Race 1 ===
Pos	Grid	No	Driver	Team	Manufacturer	Laps
1	4	8	Tyler Reddick	Richard Childress Racing	Chevrolet	15
2	9	41	Cole Custer	Stewart-Haas Racing	Ford	15
3	5	48	Alex Bowman	Hendrick Motorsports	Chevrolet	15
4	3	6	Brad Keselowski	RFK Racing	Ford	15
5	1	38	Todd Gilliland (R)	Front Row Motorsports	Ford	15
6	6	12	Ryan Blaney	Team Penske	Ford	15
7	8	7	Corey LaJoie	Spire Motorsports	Chevrolet	15
8	7	19	Martin Truex Jr.	Joe Gibbs Racing	Toyota	15
9	2	1	Ross Chastain	Trackhouse Racing Team	Chevrolet	15
Official race one results

=== Race 2 ===
Pos	Grid	No	Driver	Team	Manufacturer	Laps
1	5	20	Christopher Bell	Joe Gibbs Racing	Toyota	15
2	2	18	Kyle Busch	Joe Gibbs Racing	Toyota	15
3	7	14	Chase Briscoe	Stewart-Haas Racing	Ford	15
4	3	34	Michael McDowell	Front Row Motorsports	Ford	15
5	8	43	Erik Jones	Petty GMS Motorsports	Chevrolet	15
6	4	77	Justin Allgaier (i)	Spire Motorsports	Chevrolet	15
7	9	99	Daniel Suárez	Trackhouse Racing Team	Chevrolet	15
8	1	4	Kevin Harvick	Stewart-Haas Racing	Ford	15
9	6	78	Josh Williams (i)	Live Fast Motorsports	Ford	15
Official race two results

=== Race 3 ===
Pos	Grid	No	Driver	Team	Manufacturer	Laps
1	2	31	Justin Haley	Kaulig Racing	Chevrolet	15
2	1	22	Joey Logano	Team Penske	Ford	15
3	4	17	Chris Buescher	RFK Racing	Ford	15
4	6	45	Kurt Busch	23XI Racing	Toyota	15
5	8	3	Austin Dillon	Richard Childress Racing	Chevrolet	15
6	7	23	Bubba Wallace	23XI Racing	Toyota	15
7	3	15	J. J. Yeley (i)	Rick Ware Racing	Ford	15
8	9	16	Noah Gragson (i)	Kaulig Racing	Chevrolet	15
9	5	11	Denny Hamlin	Joe Gibbs Racing	Toyota	15
Official race three results

=== Race 4 ===
Pos	Grid	No	Driver	Team	Manufacturer	Laps
1	2	42	Ty Dillon	Petty GMS Motorsports	Chevrolet	15
2	1	9	Chase Elliott	Hendrick Motorsports	Chevrolet	15
3	6	5	Kyle Larson	Hendrick Motorsports	Chevrolet	15
4	5	47	Ricky Stenhouse Jr.	JTG Daugherty Racing	Chevrolet	15
5	4	24	William Byron	Hendrick Motorsports	Chevrolet	15
6	7	2	Austin Cindric (R)	Team Penske	Ford	15
7	9	21	Harrison Burton (R)	Wood Brothers Racing	Ford	15
8	3	10	Aric Almirola	Stewart-Haas Racing	Ford	15
9	8	51	Cody Ware	Rick Ware Racing	Ford	15
Official race four results

=== Starting Lineup ===
Pos	No.	Driver	Team	Manufacturer
1	41	Cole Custer	Stewart-Haas Racing	Ford
2	20	Christopher Bell	Joe Gibbs Racing	Toyota
3	8	Tyler Reddick	Richard Childress Racing	Chevrolet
4	14	Chase Briscoe	Stewart-Haas Racing	Ford
5	5	Kyle Larson	Hendrick Motorsports	Chevrolet
6	31	Justin Haley	Kaulig Racing	Chevrolet
7	42	Ty Dillon	Petty GMS Motorsports	Chevrolet
8	48	Alex Bowman	Hendrick Motorsports	Chevrolet
9	9	Chase Elliott	Hendrick Motorsports	Chevrolet
10	22	Joey Logano	Team Penske	Ford
11	18	Kyle Busch	Joe Gibbs Racing	Toyota
12	3	Austin Dillon	Richard Childress Racing	Chevrolet
13	45	Kurt Busch	23XI Racing	Toyota
14	43	Erik Jones	Petty GMS Motorsports	Chevrolet
15	17	Chris Buescher	RFK Racing	Ford
16	47	Ricky Stenhouse Jr.	JTG Daugherty Racing	Chevrolet
17	34	Michael McDowell	Front Row Motorsports	Ford
18	6	Brad Keselowski	RFK Racing	Ford
19	24	William Byron	Hendrick Motorsports	Chevrolet
20	2	Austin Cindric (R)	Team Penske	Ford
21	99	Daniel Suárez	Trackhouse Racing Team	Chevrolet
22	23	Bubba Wallace	23XI Racing	Toyota
23	38	Todd Gilliland (R)	Front Row Motorsports	Ford
24	21	Harrison Burton (R)	Wood Brothers Racing	Ford
25	12	Ryan Blaney	Team Penske	Ford
26	7	Corey LaJoie	Spire Motorsports	Chevrolet
27	77	Justin Allgaier (i)	Spire Motorsports	Chevrolet
28	16	Noah Gragson (i)	Kaulig Racing	Chevrolet
29	15	J. J. Yeley (i)	Rick Ware Racing	Ford
30	19	Martin Truex Jr.	Joe Gibbs Racing	Toyota
31	10	Aric Almirola	Stewart-Haas Racing	Ford
32	4	Kevin Harvick	Stewart-Haas Racing	Ford
33	1	Ross Chastain	Trackhouse Racing Team	Chevrolet
34	11	Denny Hamlin	Joe Gibbs Racing	Toyota
35	51	Cody Ware	Rick Ware Racing	Ford
36	78	Josh Williams (i)	Live Fast Motorsports	Ford
Official starting lineup

== Race ==
=== Final lap ===
During the closing laps of the race, Tyler Reddick was leading with Chase Briscoe right behind him looking to challenge for the win. Reddick was looking for his first Cup Series win in his 83rd start while Briscoe was looking for his 2nd win of the season and of his career after Briscoe won at Phoenix a month ago. On the final lap, Briscoe was almost at Reddick's rear bumper. Briscoe tried to pass in turns 1 and 2 but couldn't get alongside Reddick. In turn 3, Briscoe sent it in as fast and deep as he could and got alongside Reddick. Briscoe slid up and got into Reddick causing both to get sideways. Both tried to save it but both spun out in turn 4. Reddick did a full 360 degree spin and got his car rolling trying to chug it across the finish line. But just before he got there, Kyle Busch, who was in 3rd almost 4 seconds back during the final lap, got to the finish line first and stole the win while Reddick finished in 2nd. Briscoe would finish in 22nd. This would be Busch's 60th win of his Cup Series career and his last for Joe Gibbs Racing.

=== Stage Results ===
Stage One Laps: 75

Pos	No	Driver	Team	Manufacturer	Points
1	5	Kyle Larson	Hendrick Motorsports	Chevrolet	10
2	42	Ty Dillon	Petty GMS Motorsports	Chevrolet	9
3	20	Christopher Bell	Joe Gibbs Racing	Toyota	8
4	3	Austin Dillon	Richard Childress Racing	Chevrolet	7
5	18	Kyle Busch	Joe Gibbs Racing	Toyota	6
6	48	Alex Bowman	Hendrick Motorsports	Chevrolet	5
7	22	Joey Logano	Team Penske	Ford	4
8	8	Tyler Reddick	Richard Childress Racing	Chevrolet	3
9	12	Ryan Blaney	Team Penske	Ford	2
10	47	Ricky Stenhouse Jr.	JTG Daugherty Racing	Chevrolet	1
Official stage one results

Stage Two Laps: 75

Pos	No	Driver	Team	Manufacturer	Points
1	14	Chase Briscoe	Stewart-Haas Racing	Ford	10
2	20	Christopher Bell	Joe Gibbs Racing	Toyota	9
3	99	Daniel Suárez	Trackhouse Racing Team	Chevrolet	8
4	9	Chase Elliott	Hendrick Motorsports	Chevrolet	7
5	18	Kyle Busch	Joe Gibbs Racing	Toyota	6
6	5	Kyle Larson	Hendrick Motorsports	Chevrolet	5
7	22	Joey Logano	Team Penske	Ford	4
8	34	Michael McDowell	Front Row Motorsports	Ford	3
9	12	Ryan Blaney	Team Penske	Ford	2
10	8	Tyler Reddick	Richard Childress Racing	Chevrolet	1
Official stage two results

=== Final Stage Results ===
Stage Three Laps: 100

Pos	Grid	No	Driver	Team	Manufacturer	Laps	Points
1	11	18	Kyle Busch	Joe Gibbs Racing	Toyota	250	52
2	3	8	Tyler Reddick	Richard Childress Racing	Chevrolet	250	39
3	10	22	Joey Logano	Team Penske	Ford	250	42
4	5	5	Kyle Larson	Hendrick Motorsports	Chevrolet	250	48
5	25	12	Ryan Blaney	Team Penske	Ford	250	36
6	8	48	Alex Bowman	Hendrick Motorsports	Chevrolet	250	36
7	2	20	Christopher Bell	Joe Gibbs Racing	Toyota	250	47
8	9	9	Chase Elliott	Hendrick Motorsports	Chevrolet	250	36
9	17	34	Michael McDowell	Front Row Motorsports	Ford	250	31
10	7	42	Ty Dillon	Petty GMS Motorsports	Chevrolet	250	36
11	18	6	Brad Keselowski	RFK Racing	Ford	250	26
12	21	99	Daniel Suárez	Trackhouse Racing Team	Chevrolet	250	33
13	1	41	Cole Custer	Stewart-Haas Racing	Ford	250	24
14	6	31	Justin Haley	Kaulig Racing	Chevrolet	250	23
15	15	17	Chris Buescher	RFK Racing	Ford	250	22
16	20	2	Austin Cindric (R)	Team Penske	Ford	250	21
17	23	38	Todd Gilliland (R)	Front Row Motorsports	Ford	250	20
18	19	24	William Byron	Hendrick Motorsports	Chevrolet	250	19
19	26	7	Corey LaJoie	Spire Motorsports	Chevrolet	250	18
20	24	21	Harrison Burton (R)	Wood Brothers Racing	Ford	250	17
21	30	19	Martin Truex Jr.	Joe Gibbs Racing	Toyota	250	16
22	4	14	Chase Briscoe	Stewart-Haas Racing	Ford	250	25
23	31	10	Aric Almirola	Stewart-Haas Racing	Ford	250	14
24	14	43	Erik Jones	Petty GMS Motorsports	Chevrolet	250	13
25	36	78	Josh Williams (i)	Live Fast Motorsports	Ford	250	0
26	35	51	Cody Ware	Rick Ware Racing	Ford	250	11
27	28	16	Noah Gragson (i)	Kaulig Racing	Chevrolet	248	0
28	22	23	Bubba Wallace	23XI Racing	Toyota	245	9
29	16	47	Ricky Stenhouse Jr.	JTG Daugherty Racing	Chevrolet	240	9
30	29	15	J. J. Yeley (i)	Rick Ware Racing	Ford	221	0
31	12	3	Austin Dillon	Richard Childress Racing	Chevrolet	211	13
32	13	45	Kurt Busch	23XI Racing	Toyota	211	5
33	33	1	Ross Chastain	Trackhouse Racing Team	Chevrolet	150	4
34	32	4	Kevin Harvick	Stewart-Haas Racing	Ford	100	3
35	34	11	Denny Hamlin	Joe Gibbs Racing	Toyota	91	2
36	27	77	Justin Allgaier (i)	Spire Motorsports	Chevrolet	74	0
Official race results

=== Race statistics ===
- Lead changes: 6 among 5 different drivers
- Cautions/Laps: 14 for 82
- Red flags: 1 for 16 minutes and 51 seconds
- Time of race: 3 hours, 34 minutes and 27 seconds
- Average speed: 34.973 miles per hour (56.284 km/h)

== Media ==
=== Television ===
The Food City Dirt Race was carried by Fox in the United States. Mike Joy, Clint Bowyer and 12-time Bristol winner – and all-time Bristol race winner – Darrell Waltrip called the race from the broadcast booth, his first since the 2019 Toyota/Save Mart 350 when he retired from commentary duties. Jamie Little and Regan Smith handled pit road for the television side. Larry McReynolds provided insight also from pit road.

Fox
Booth announcers	Pit reporters	In-race analyst
Lap-by-lap: Mike Joy; Color-commentator: Clint Bowyer; Color-commentator: Darrell Waltrip	Jamie Little; Regan Smith	Larry McReynolds

=== Radio ===
PRN had the radio call for the race which was simulcasted on Sirius XM NASCAR Radio. Doug Rice and Mark Garrow called the race in the booth when the field raced down the frontstretch. Rob Albright called the race from atop the turn 3 suites when the field raced down the backstretch. Brad Gillie, Brett McMillan, Lenny Batycki and Alan Cavanna covered the action on pit lane for PRN.

PRN
Booth announcers	Turn announcers	Pit reporters
Lead announcer: Doug Rice; Announcer: Mark Garrow	Backstretch: Rob Albright	Brad Gillie; Brett McMillan; Lenny Batycki; Alan Cavanna

== Standings after the race ==
Drivers' Championship standings

	Pos	Driver	Points
	1	Chase Elliott	324
	2	Ryan Blaney	321 (–3)
1	3	Joey Logano	303 (–21)
1	4	William Byron	295 (–29)
1	5	Alex Bowman	273 (–51)
4	6	Kyle Busch	273 (–51)
	7	Martin Truex Jr.	253 (–71)
3	8	Ross Chastain	250 (–74)
4	9	Kyle Larson	249 (–75)
1	10	Chase Briscoe	245 (–79)
1	11	Tyler Reddick	241 (–83)
4	12	Aric Almirola	237 (–87)
4	13	Kevin Harvick	225 (–99)
	14	Austin Cindric	222 (–102)
4	15	Christopher Bell	220 (–104)
2	16	Daniel Suárez	212 (–112)
Official driver's standings

Manufacturers' Championship standings

Pos	Manufacturer	Points
1	Chevrolet	331
2	Ford	308 (–23)
3	Toyota	308 (–23)

- Note: Only the first 16 positions are included for the driver standings.
- . – Driver has clinched a position in the NASCAR Cup Series playoffs.

Previous race: 2022 Blue-Emu Maximum Pain Relief 400	NASCAR Cup Series; 2022 season	Next race: 2022 GEICO 500
