= 2022 DuraMAX Drydene 400 =

NASCAR Cup Series race

2022 DuraMAX Drydene 400 presented by RelaDyne
Race details
- Race 11 of 36 in the 2022 NASCAR Cup Series
- Date: May 1–2, 2022
- Location: Dover Motor Speedway in Dover, Delaware
- Course: Permanent racing facility
- Course length: 1 miles (1.6 km)
- Distance: 400 laps, 400 mi (640 km)
- Average speed: 104.507 miles per hour (168.188 km/h)

Pole position
Driver	Chris Buescher	RFK Racing
- Time: 22.479

Most laps led
Driver	Kyle Busch	Joe Gibbs Racing
- Laps: 103

Winner
No. 9	Chase Elliott	Hendrick Motorsports

Television in the United States
- Network: FS1
- Announcers: Mike Joy, Clint Bowyer, and Larry McReynolds

Radio in the United States
- Radio: MRN
- Booth announcers: Alex Hayden, Jeff Striegle, and Rusty Wallace
- Turn announcers: Mike Bagley (Backstretch)

The 2022 DuraMAX Drydene 400 presented by RelaDyne was a NASCAR Cup Series race held on May 1 and 2, 2022, at Dover Motor Speedway in Dover, Delaware. Contested over 400 laps on the 1-mile (1.6 km) concrete speedway, it was the 11th race of the 2022 NASCAR Cup Series season. The race began on Sunday, May 1, before rain delayed it to Monday, May 2, after 78 laps were complete.

== Report ==
=== Background ===
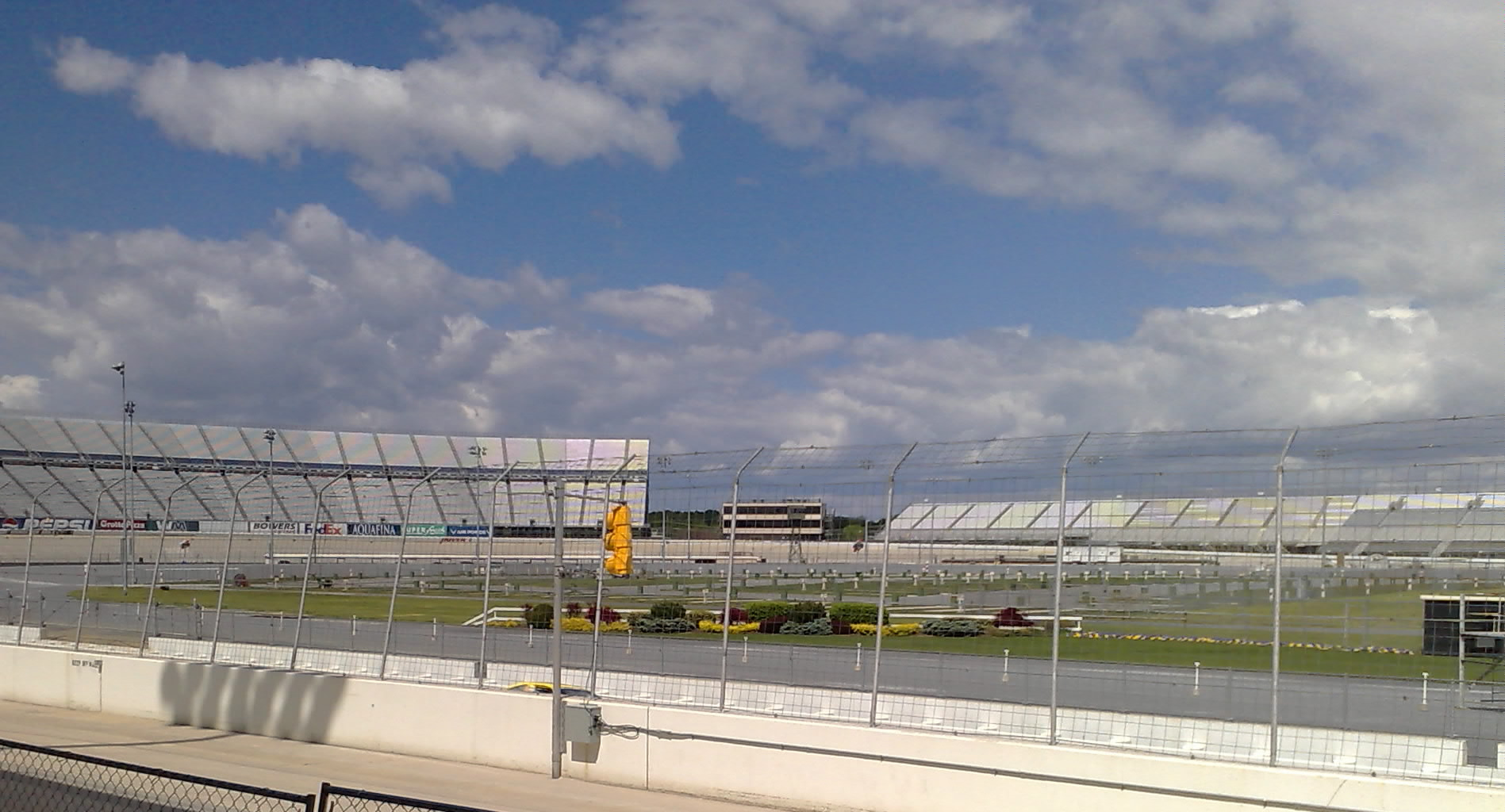
Dover Motor Speedway, the track where the race was held.

Dover Motor Speedway is an oval race track in Dover, Delaware, United States that held at least one NASCAR race each year since 1969, including two per year from 1971 to 2020. In addition to NASCAR, the track also hosted USAC and the NTT IndyCar Series. The track features one layout, a 1 mile (1.6 km) concrete oval, with 24° banking in the turns and 9° banking on the straights. The speedway is owned and operated by Speedway Motorsports.

The track, nicknamed "The Monster Mile", was built in 1969 by Melvin Joseph of Melvin L. Joseph Construction Company, Inc., with an asphalt surface, but was replaced with concrete in 1995. Six years later in 2001, the track's capacity moved to 135,000 seats, making the track have the largest capacity of sports venue in the mid-Atlantic. In 2002, the name changed to Dover International Speedway from Dover Downs International Speedway after Dover Downs Gaming and Entertainment split, making Dover Motorsports. From 2007 to 2009, the speedway worked on an improvement project called "The Monster Makeover", which expanded facilities at the track and beautified the track. After the 2014 season, the track's capacity was reduced to 95,500 seats.

==== Entry list ====
- (R) denotes rookie driver.
- (i) denotes driver who is ineligible for series driver points.

No.	Driver	Team	Manufacturer
1	Ross Chastain	Trackhouse Racing Team	Chevrolet
2	Austin Cindric (R)	Team Penske	Ford
3	Austin Dillon	Richard Childress Racing	Chevrolet
4	Kevin Harvick	Stewart-Haas Racing	Ford
5	Kyle Larson	Hendrick Motorsports	Chevrolet
6	Brad Keselowski	RFK Racing	Ford
7	Corey LaJoie	Spire Motorsports	Chevrolet
8	Tyler Reddick	Richard Childress Racing	Chevrolet
9	Chase Elliott	Hendrick Motorsports	Chevrolet
10	Aric Almirola	Stewart-Haas Racing	Ford
11	Denny Hamlin	Joe Gibbs Racing	Toyota
12	Ryan Blaney	Team Penske	Ford
14	Chase Briscoe	Stewart-Haas Racing	Ford
15	Ryan Preece (i)	Rick Ware Racing	Ford
16	A. J. Allmendinger (i)	Kaulig Racing	Chevrolet
17	Chris Buescher	RFK Racing	Ford
18	Kyle Busch	Joe Gibbs Racing	Toyota
19	Martin Truex Jr.	Joe Gibbs Racing	Toyota
20	Christopher Bell	Joe Gibbs Racing	Toyota
21	Harrison Burton (R)	Wood Brothers Racing	Ford
22	Joey Logano	Team Penske	Ford
23	Bubba Wallace	23XI Racing	Toyota
24	William Byron	Hendrick Motorsports	Chevrolet
31	Justin Haley	Kaulig Racing	Chevrolet
34	Michael McDowell	Front Row Motorsports	Ford
38	Todd Gilliland (R)	Front Row Motorsports	Ford
41	Cole Custer	Stewart-Haas Racing	Ford
42	Ty Dillon	Petty GMS Motorsports	Chevrolet
43	Erik Jones	Petty GMS Motorsports	Chevrolet
45	Kurt Busch	23XI Racing	Toyota
47	Ricky Stenhouse Jr.	JTG Daugherty Racing	Chevrolet
48	Alex Bowman	Hendrick Motorsports	Chevrolet
51	Cody Ware	Rick Ware Racing	Ford
77	Josh Bilicki (i)	Spire Motorsports	Chevrolet
78	B. J. McLeod	Live Fast Motorsports	Ford
99	Daniel Suárez	Trackhouse Racing Team	Chevrolet
Official entry list

== Practice ==
Austin Cindric was the fastest in the practice session with a time of 22.807 seconds and a speed of 157.846 mph (254.029 km/h).

=== Practice results ===
Pos	No.	Driver	Team	Manufacturer	Time	Speed
1	2	Austin Cindric (R)	Team Penske	Ford	22.807	157.846
2	16	A. J. Allmendinger (i)	Kaulig Racing	Chevrolet	22.813	157.805
3	31	Justin Haley	Kaulig Racing	Chevrolet	22.829	157.694
Official practice results

== Qualifying ==
Chris Buescher scored the pole for the race with a time of 22.479 and a speed of 160.149 mph (257.735 km/h).

=== Qualifying results ===
Pos	No.	Driver	Team	Manufacturer	R1	R2
1	17	Chris Buescher	RFK Racing	Ford	22.515	22.479
2	11	Denny Hamlin	Joe Gibbs Racing	Toyota	22.495	22.536
3	5	Kyle Larson	Hendrick Motorsports	Chevrolet	22.495	22.552
4	9	Chase Elliott	Hendrick Motorsports	Chevrolet	22.467	22.609
5	12	Ryan Blaney	Team Penske	Ford	22.453	22.617
6	48	Alex Bowman	Hendrick Motorsports	Chevrolet	22.504	22.626
7	1	Ross Chastain	Trackhouse Racing Team	Chevrolet	22.423	22.643
8	99	Daniel Suárez	Trackhouse Racing Team	Chevrolet	22.608	22.708
9	23	Bubba Wallace	23XI Racing	Toyota	22.544	22.810
10	18	Kyle Busch	Joe Gibbs Racing	Toyota	22.585	22.859
11	4	Kevin Harvick	Stewart-Haas Racing	Ford	22.547	—
12	2	Austin Cindric (R)	Team Penske	Ford	22.592	—
13	15	Ryan Preece (i)	Rick Ware Racing	Ford	22.620	—
14	31	Justin Haley	Kaulig Racing	Chevrolet	22.631	—
15	47	Ricky Stenhouse Jr.	JTG Daugherty Racing	Chevrolet	22.640	—
16	45	Kurt Busch	23XI Racing	Toyota	22.645	—
17	20	Christopher Bell	Joe Gibbs Racing	Toyota	22.647	—
18	19	Martin Truex Jr.	Joe Gibbs Racing	Toyota	22.682	—
19	16	A. J. Allmendinger (i)	Kaulig Racing	Chevrolet	22.684	—
20	6	Brad Keselowski	RFK Racing	Ford	22.695	—
21	7	Corey LaJoie	Spire Motorsports	Chevrolet	22.705	—
22	22	Joey Logano	Team Penske	Ford	22.734	—
23	14	Chase Briscoe	Stewart-Haas Racing	Ford	22.741	—
24	3	Austin Dillon	Richard Childress Racing	Chevrolet	22.773	—
25	43	Erik Jones	Petty GMS Motorsports	Chevrolet	22.791	—
26	8	Tyler Reddick	Richard Childress Racing	Chevrolet	22.833	—
27	10	Aric Almirola	Stewart-Haas Racing	Ford	22.858	—
28	51	Cody Ware	Rick Ware Racing	Ford	22.895	—
29	34	Michael McDowell	Front Row Motorsports	Ford	22.905	—
30	41	Cole Custer	Stewart-Haas Racing	Ford	23.018	—
31	42	Ty Dillon	Petty GMS Motorsports	Chevrolet	23.190	—
32	78	B. J. McLeod	Live Fast Motorsports	Ford	23.803	—
33	24	William Byron	Hendrick Motorsports	Chevrolet	0.000	—
34	38	Todd Gilliland (R)	Front Row Motorsports	Ford	0.000	—
35	21	Harrison Burton (R)	Wood Brothers Racing	Ford	0.000	—
36	77	Josh Bilicki (i)	Spire Motorsports	Chevrolet	0.000	—
Official qualifying results

== Race ==
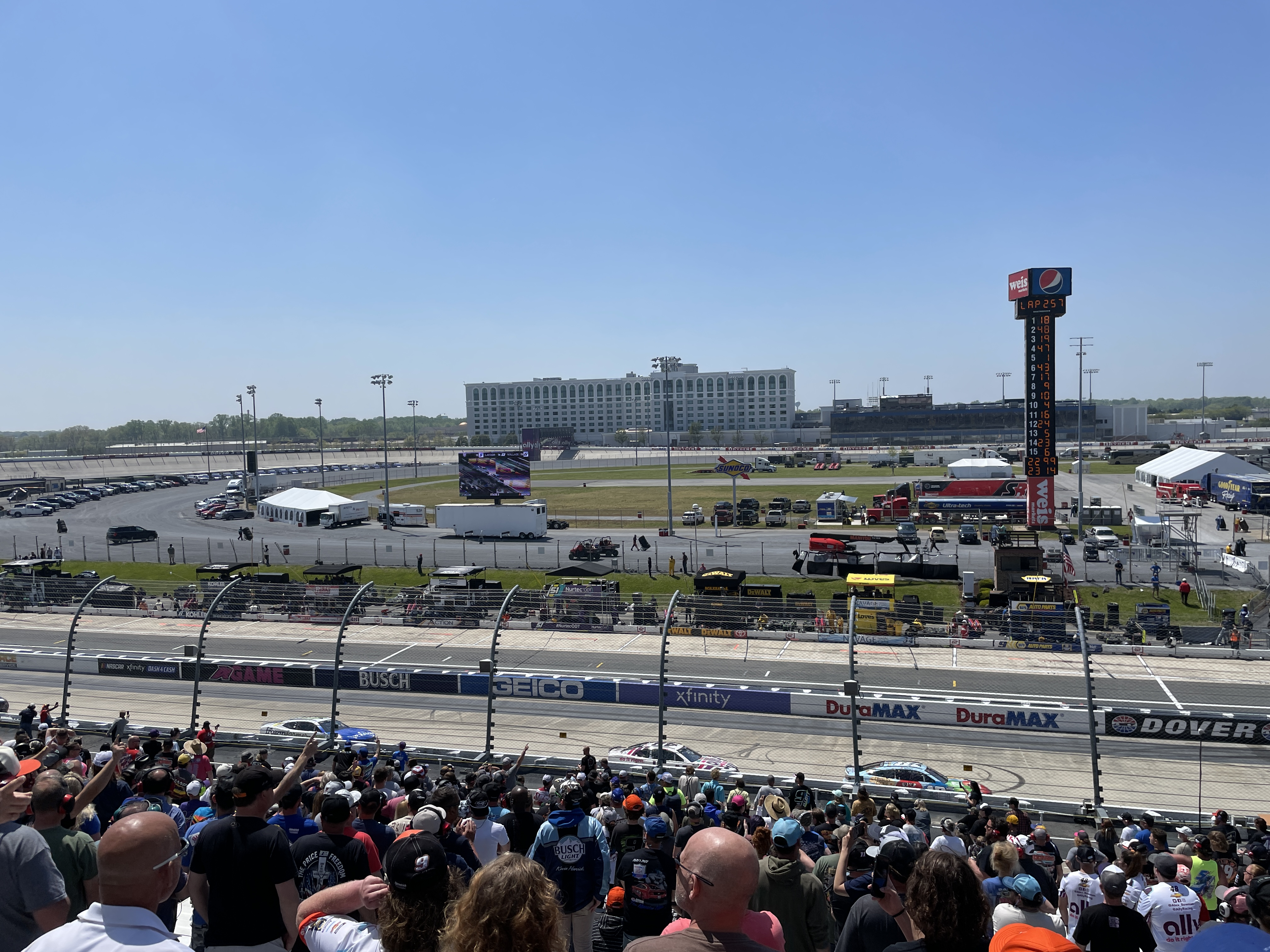
Kyle Busch leads in the beginning of the third stage

=== Stage Results ===
Stage One Laps: 120

Pos	No	Driver	Team	Manufacturer	Points
1	11	Denny Hamlin	Joe Gibbs Racing	Toyota	10
2	9	Chase Elliott	Hendrick Motorsports	Chevrolet	9
3	20	Christopher Bell	Joe Gibbs Racing	Toyota	8
4	1	Ross Chastain	Trackhouse Racing Team	Chevrolet	7
5	19	Martin Truex Jr.	Joe Gibbs Racing	Toyota	6
6	5	Kyle Larson	Hendrick Motorsports	Chevrolet	5
7	24	William Byron	Hendrick Motorsports	Chevrolet	4
8	17	Chris Buescher	RFK Racing	Ford	3
9	18	Kyle Busch	Joe Gibbs Racing	Toyota	2
10	6	Brad Keselowski	RFK Racing	Ford	1
Official stage one results

Stage Two Laps: 130

Pos	No	Driver	Team	Manufacturer	Points
1	12	Ryan Blaney	Team Penske	Ford	10
2	18	Kyle Busch	Joe Gibbs Racing	Toyota	9
3	48	Alex Bowman	Hendrick Motorsports	Chevrolet	8
4	19	Martin Truex Jr.	Joe Gibbs Racing	Toyota	7
5	47	Ricky Stenhouse Jr.	JTG Daugherty Racing	Chevrolet	6
6	1	Ross Chastain	Trackhouse Racing Team	Chevrolet	5
7	43	Erik Jones	Petty GMS Motorsports	Chevrolet	4
8	21	Harrison Burton (R)	Wood Brothers Racing	Ford	3
9	17	Chris Buescher	RFK Racing	Ford	2
10	9	Chase Elliott	Hendrick Motorsports	Chevrolet	1
Official stage two results

=== Final Stage Results ===
Stage Three Laps: 150

Pos	Grid	No	Driver	Team	Manufacturer	Laps	Points
1	4	9	Chase Elliott	Hendrick Motorsports	Chevrolet	400	50
2	15	47	Ricky Stenhouse Jr.	JTG Daugherty Racing	Chevrolet	400	41
3	7	1	Ross Chastain	Trackhouse Racing Team	Chevrolet	400	46
4	17	20	Christopher Bell	Joe Gibbs Racing	Toyota	400	41
5	6	48	Alex Bowman	Hendrick Motorsports	Chevrolet	400	40
6	3	5	Kyle Larson	Hendrick Motorsports	Chevrolet	400	36
7	10	18	Kyle Busch	Joe Gibbs Racing	Toyota	400	41
8	1	17	Chris Buescher	RFK Racing	Ford	400	34
9	11	4	Kevin Harvick	Stewart-Haas Racing	Ford	400	28
10	25	43	Erik Jones	Petty GMS Motorsports	Chevrolet	400	31
11	14	31	Justin Haley	Kaulig Racing	Chevrolet	400	26
12	18	19	Martin Truex Jr.	Joe Gibbs Racing	Toyota	400	38
13	23	14	Chase Briscoe	Stewart-Haas Racing	Ford	400	24
14	8	99	Daniel Suárez	Trackhouse Racing Team	Chevrolet	400	23
15	30	41	Cole Custer	Stewart-Haas Racing	Ford	400	22
16	9	23	Bubba Wallace	23XI Racing	Toyota	399	21
17	29	34	Michael McDowell	Front Row Motorsports	Ford	399	20
18	21	7	Corey LaJoie	Spire Motorsports	Chevrolet	399	19
19	27	10	Aric Almirola	Stewart-Haas Racing	Ford	399	18
20	20	6	Brad Keselowski	RFK Racing	Ford	399	18
21	2	11	Denny Hamlin	Joe Gibbs Racing	Toyota	399	26
22	33	24	William Byron	Hendrick Motorsports	Chevrolet	399	19
23	24	3	Austin Dillon	Richard Childress Racing	Chevrolet	398	14
24	35	21	Harrison Burton (R)	Wood Brothers Racing	Ford	398	16
25	13	15	Ryan Preece (i)	Rick Ware Racing	Ford	398	0
26	5	12	Ryan Blaney	Team Penske	Ford	397	21
27	31	42	Ty Dillon	Petty GMS Motorsports	Chevrolet	396	10
28	34	38	Todd Gilliland (R)	Front Row Motorsports	Ford	396	9
29	22	22	Joey Logano	Team Penske	Ford	396	8
30	26	8	Tyler Reddick	Richard Childress Racing	Chevrolet	390	7
31	16	45	Kurt Busch	23XI Racing	Toyota	388	6
32	36	77	Josh Bilicki (i)	Spire Motorsports	Chevrolet	381	0
33	19	16	A. J. Allmendinger (i)	Kaulig Racing	Chevrolet	321	0
34	28	51	Cody Ware	Rick Ware Racing	Ford	238	3
35	32	78	B. J. McLeod	Live Fast Motorsports	Ford	167	2
36	12	2	Austin Cindric (R)	Team Penske	Ford	91	1
Official race results

=== Race statistics ===
- Lead changes: 17 among 10 different drivers
- Cautions/Laps: 13 for 75 laps
- Red flags: 1 for weather
- Time of race: 3 hours, 49 minutes and 39 seconds
- Average speed: 104.507 miles per hour (168.188 km/h)

== Media ==
=== Television ===
Fox Sports covered the race on the television side. Mike Joy, Clint Bowyer and Larry McReynolds called the race from the broadcast booth. Jamie Little and Regan Smith handled pit road for the television side.

FS1
Booth announcers	Pit reporters
Lap-by-lap: Mike Joy; Color-commentator: Clint Bowyer; Color-commentator: Larry McReynolds	Jamie Little; Regan Smith

=== Radio ===
MRN had the radio call for the race and was also simulcasted on Sirius XM NASCAR Radio. This would be the final Dover race covered by MRN Radio, radio rights shifted to PRN for 2023 onwards.

MRN Radio
Booth announcers	Turn announcers	Pit reporters
Lead announcer: Alex Hayden; Announcer: Jeff Striegle; Announcer: Rusty Wallace	Backstretch: Mike Bagley	Kim Coon; Steve Post

== Standings after the race ==
Drivers' Championship standings

	Pos	Driver	Points
	1	Chase Elliott	418
	2	Ryan Blaney	368 (–50)
	3	William Byron	353 (–65)
	4	Kyle Busch	353 (–65)
	5	Alex Bowman	349 (–69)
3	6	Ross Chastain	338 (–80)
1	7	Martin Truex Jr.	336 (–82)
1	8	Kyle Larson	335 (–83)
3	9	Joey Logano	316 (–102)
4	10	Christopher Bell	284 (–134)
1	11	Aric Almirola	283 (–135)
1	12	Kevin Harvick	280 (–138)
1	13	Chase Briscoe	270 (–148)
3	14	Erik Jones	262 (–156)
2	15	Austin Dillon	259 (–159)
1	16	Tyler Reddick	249 (–169)
Official driver's standings

Manufacturers' Championship standings

Pos	Manufacturer	Points
1	Chevrolet	411
2	Toyota	374 (–37)
3	Ford	366 (–46)

- Note: Only the first 16 positions are included for the driver standings.
- . – Driver has clinched a position in the NASCAR Cup Series playoffs.

Previous race: 2022 GEICO 500	NASCAR Cup Series; 2022 season	Next race: 2022 Goodyear 400
