= 2022 Blue-Emu Maximum Pain Relief 400 =

NASCAR Cup Series race

Race details
- Race 8 of 36 in the 2022 NASCAR Cup Series
- The 2022 Blue-Emu Maximum Pain Relief 400 program cover.
- Date: April 9, 2022
- Location: Martinsville Speedway in Ridgeway, Virginia
- Course: Permanent racing facility
- Course length: 0.526 miles (0.847 km)
- Distance: 403 laps, 211.978 mi (341.341 km)
- Scheduled distance: 400 laps, 210.4 mi (338.8 km)
- Average speed: 79.244 miles per hour (127.531 km/h)

Pole position
| Driver | Chase Elliott | Hendrick Motorsports |
- Time: 19.694

Most laps led
| Driver | William Byron | Hendrick Motorsports |
- Laps: 212

Winner
| No. 24 | William Byron | Hendrick Motorsports |

Television in the United States
- Network: FS1
- Announcers: Mike Joy, Clint Bowyer, and Chad Knaus
- Nielsen ratings: 1.10, 1.885 Million Viewers

Radio in the United States
- Radio: MRN
- Booth announcers: Alex Hayden, Jeff Striegle, and Rusty Wallace
- Turn announcers: Dave Moody (Backstretch)

The 2022 Blue-Emu Maximum Pain Relief 400 was a NASCAR Cup Series race held on April 9, 2022, at Martinsville Speedway in Ridgeway, Virginia. Contested over 403 laps – extended from 400 laps due to an overtime finish, on the 0.526 mile (0.847 km) paperclip-shaped short track, it was the eighth race of the 2022 NASCAR Cup Series season.

== Report ==
The layout of Martinsville Speedway, the track where the race was held

=== Background ===
Martinsville Speedway is a NASCAR-owned stock car racing track located in Henry County, in Ridgeway, Virginia, just to the south of Martinsville. At 0.526 miles (0.847 km) in length, it is the shortest track in the NASCAR Cup Series. The track was also one of the first paved oval tracks in NASCAR, being built in 1947 by H. Clay Earles.

==== Entry list ====
- (R) denotes rookie driver.
- (i) denotes driver who is ineligible for series driver points.

| No. | Driver | Team | Manufacturer |
|---|---|---|---|
| 1 | Ross Chastain | Trackhouse Racing Team | Chevrolet |
| 2 | Austin Cindric (R) | Team Penske | Ford |
| 3 | Austin Dillon | Richard Childress Racing | Chevrolet |
| 4 | Kevin Harvick | Stewart-Haas Racing | Ford |
| 5 | Kyle Larson | Hendrick Motorsports | Chevrolet |
| 6 | Brad Keselowski | RFK Racing | Ford |
| 7 | Corey LaJoie | Spire Motorsports | Chevrolet |
| 8 | Tyler Reddick | Richard Childress Racing | Chevrolet |
| 9 | Chase Elliott | Hendrick Motorsports | Chevrolet |
| 10 | Aric Almirola | Stewart-Haas Racing | Ford |
| 11 | Denny Hamlin | Joe Gibbs Racing | Toyota |
| 12 | Ryan Blaney | Team Penske | Ford |
| 14 | Chase Briscoe | Stewart-Haas Racing | Ford |
| 15 | J. J. Yeley (i) | Rick Ware Racing | Ford |
| 16 | A. J. Allmendinger (i) | Kaulig Racing | Chevrolet |
| 17 | Chris Buescher | RFK Racing | Ford |
| 18 | Kyle Busch | Joe Gibbs Racing | Toyota |
| 19 | Martin Truex Jr. | Joe Gibbs Racing | Toyota |
| 20 | Christopher Bell | Joe Gibbs Racing | Toyota |
| 21 | Harrison Burton (R) | Wood Brothers Racing | Ford |
| 22 | Joey Logano | Team Penske | Ford |
| 23 | Bubba Wallace | 23XI Racing | Toyota |
| 24 | William Byron | Hendrick Motorsports | Chevrolet |
| 31 | Justin Haley | Kaulig Racing | Chevrolet |
| 34 | Michael McDowell | Front Row Motorsports | Ford |
| 38 | Todd Gilliland (R) | Front Row Motorsports | Ford |
| 41 | Cole Custer | Stewart-Haas Racing | Ford |
| 42 | Ty Dillon | Petty GMS Motorsports | Chevrolet |
| 43 | Erik Jones | Petty GMS Motorsports | Chevrolet |
| 45 | Kurt Busch | 23XI Racing | Toyota |
| 47 | Ricky Stenhouse Jr. | JTG Daugherty Racing | Chevrolet |
| 48 | Alex Bowman | Hendrick Motorsports | Chevrolet |
| 51 | Cody Ware | Rick Ware Racing | Ford |
| 77 | Josh Bilicki (i) | Spire Motorsports | Chevrolet |
| 78 | B. J. McLeod | Live Fast Motorsports | Ford |
| 99 | Daniel Suárez | Trackhouse Racing Team | Chevrolet |
Official entry list

== Practice ==
Chase Elliott was the fastest in the practice session with a time of 19.995 seconds and a speed of 94.704 mph (152.411 km/h).

=== Practice results ===
| Pos | No. | Driver | Team | Manufacturer | Time | Speed |
|---|---|---|---|---|---|---|
| 1 | 9 | Chase Elliott | Hendrick Motorsports | Chevrolet | 19.995 | 94.704 |
| 2 | 18 | Kyle Busch | Joe Gibbs Racing | Toyota | 20.032 | 94.529 |
| 3 | 23 | Bubba Wallace | 23XI Racing | Toyota | 20.038 | 94.500 |
Official practice results

== Qualifying ==
Chase Elliott scored the pole for the race with a time of 19.694 and a speed of 96.151 mph (154.740 km/h).

=== Qualifying results ===
| Pos | No. | Driver | Team | Manufacturer | R1 | R2 |
|---|---|---|---|---|---|---|
| 1 | 9 | Chase Elliott | Hendrick Motorsports | Chevrolet | 19.746 | 19.694 |
| 2 | 10 | Aric Almirola | Stewart-Haas Racing | Ford | 19.841 | 19.799 |
| 3 | 41 | Cole Custer | Stewart-Haas Racing | Ford | 19.724 | 19.808 |
| 4 | 17 | Chris Buescher | RFK Racing | Ford | 19.774 | 19.850 |
| 5 | 24 | William Byron | Hendrick Motorsports | Chevrolet | 19.835 | 19.893 |
| 6 | 4 | Kevin Harvick | Stewart-Haas Racing | Ford | 19.778 | 19.941 |
| 7 | 20 | Christopher Bell | Joe Gibbs Racing | Toyota | 19.875 | 19.965 |
| 8 | 5 | Kyle Larson | Hendrick Motorsports | Chevrolet | 19.822 | 20.003 |
| 9 | 6 | Brad Keselowski | RFK Racing | Ford | 19.739 | 20.015 |
| 10 | 38 | Todd Gilliland (R) | Front Row Motorsports | Ford | 19.733 | 20.062 |
| 11 | 18 | Kyle Busch | Joe Gibbs Racing | Toyota | 19.775 | — |
| 12 | 12 | Ryan Blaney | Team Penske | Ford | 19.789 | — |
| 13 | 2 | Austin Cindric (R) | Team Penske | Ford | 19.790 | — |
| 14 | 22 | Joey Logano | Team Penske | Ford | 19.792 | — |
| 15 | 48 | Alex Bowman | Hendrick Motorsports | Chevrolet | 19.863 | — |
| 16 | 34 | Michael McDowell | Front Row Motorsports | Ford | 19.863 | — |
| 17 | 31 | Justin Haley | Kaulig Racing | Chevrolet | 19.867 | — |
| 18 | 45 | Kurt Busch | 23XI Racing | Toyota | 19.901 | — |
| 19 | 14 | Chase Briscoe | Stewart-Haas Racing | Ford | 19.904 | — |
| 20 | 19 | Martin Truex Jr. | Joe Gibbs Racing | Toyota | 19.937 | — |
| 21 | 23 | Bubba Wallace | 23XI Racing | Toyota | 19.965 | — |
| 22 | 8 | Tyler Reddick | Richard Childress Racing | Chevrolet | 19.982 | — |
| 23 | 3 | Austin Dillon | Richard Childress Racing | Chevrolet | 19.986 | — |
| 24 | 43 | Erik Jones | Petty GMS Motorsports | Chevrolet | 19.996 | — |
| 25 | 11 | Denny Hamlin | Joe Gibbs Racing | Toyota | 20.083 | — |
| 26 | 7 | Corey LaJoie | Spire Motorsports | Chevrolet | 20.095 | — |
| 27 | 1 | Ross Chastain | Trackhouse Racing Team | Chevrolet | 20.100 | — |
| 28 | 47 | Ricky Stenhouse Jr. | JTG Daugherty Racing | Chevrolet | 20.113 | — |
| 29 | 21 | Harrison Burton (R) | Wood Brothers Racing | Ford | 20.134 | — |
| 30 | 99 | Daniel Suárez | Trackhouse Racing Team | Chevrolet | 20.145 | — |
| 31 | 77 | Josh Bilicki (i) | Spire Motorsports | Chevrolet | 20.269 | — |
| 32 | 15 | J. J. Yeley (i) | Rick Ware Racing | Ford | 20.494 | — |
| 33 | 78 | B. J. McLeod | Live Fast Motorsports | Ford | 20.545 | — |
| 34 | 42 | Ty Dillon | Petty GMS Motorsports | Chevrolet | 20.591 | — |
| 35 | 51 | Cody Ware | Rick Ware Racing | Ford | 21.021 | — |
| 36 | 16 | A. J. Allmendinger (i) | Kaulig Racing | Chevrolet | 0.000 | — |
Official qualifying results

== Race ==
=== Stage Results ===
Stage One Laps: 80

| Pos | No | Driver | Team | Manufacturer | Points |
|---|---|---|---|---|---|
| 1 | 9 | Chase Elliott | Hendrick Motorsports | Chevrolet | 10 |
| 2 | 24 | William Byron | Hendrick Motorsports | Chevrolet | 9 |
| 3 | 41 | Cole Custer | Stewart-Haas Racing | Ford | 8 |
| 4 | 20 | Christopher Bell | Joe Gibbs Racing | Toyota | 7 |
| 5 | 10 | Aric Almirola | Stewart-Haas Racing | Ford | 6 |
| 6 | 4 | Kevin Harvick | Stewart-Haas Racing | Ford | 5 |
| 7 | 12 | Ryan Blaney | Team Penske | Ford | 4 |
| 8 | 22 | Joey Logano | Team Penske | Ford | 3 |
| 9 | 2 | Austin Cindric (R) | Team Penske | Ford | 2 |
| 10 | 45 | Kurt Busch | 23XI Racing | Toyota | 1 |
Official stage one results

Stage Two Laps: 100

| Pos | No | Driver | Team | Manufacturer | Points |
|---|---|---|---|---|---|
| 1 | 9 | Chase Elliott | Hendrick Motorsports | Chevrolet | 10 |
| 2 | 24 | William Byron | Hendrick Motorsports | Chevrolet | 9 |
| 3 | 22 | Joey Logano | Team Penske | Ford | 8 |
| 4 | 12 | Ryan Blaney | Team Penske | Ford | 7 |
| 5 | 41 | Cole Custer | Stewart-Haas Racing | Ford | 6 |
| 6 | 3 | Austin Dillon | Richard Childress Racing | Chevrolet | 5 |
| 7 | 10 | Aric Almirola | Stewart-Haas Racing | Ford | 4 |
| 8 | 2 | Austin Cindric (R) | Team Penske | Ford | 3 |
| 9 | 20 | Christopher Bell | Joe Gibbs Racing | Toyota | 2 |
| 10 | 4 | Kevin Harvick | Stewart-Haas Racing | Ford | 1 |
Official stage two results

=== Final Stage Results ===
Stage Three Laps: 220

| Pos | Grid | No | Driver | Team | Manufacturer | Laps | Points |
|---|---|---|---|---|---|---|---|
| 1 | 5 | 24 | William Byron | Hendrick Motorsports | Chevrolet | 403 | 58 |
| 2 | 14 | 22 | Joey Logano | Team Penske | Ford | 403 | 46 |
| 3 | 23 | 3 | Austin Dillon | Richard Childress Racing | Chevrolet | 403 | 39 |
| 4 | 12 | 12 | Ryan Blaney | Team Penske | Ford | 403 | 44 |
| 5 | 27 | 1 | Ross Chastain | Trackhouse Racing Team | Chevrolet | 403 | 32 |
| 6 | 18 | 45 | Kurt Busch | 23XI Racing | Toyota | 403 | 32 |
| 7 | 11 | 18 | Kyle Busch | Joe Gibbs Racing | Toyota | 403 | 30 |
| 8 | 2 | 10 | Aric Almirola | Stewart-Haas Racing | Ford | 403 | 39 |
| 9 | 19 | 14 | Chase Briscoe | Stewart-Haas Racing | Ford | 403 | 28 |
| 10 | 1 | 9 | Chase Elliott | Hendrick Motorsports | Chevrolet | 403 | 47 |
| 11 | 13 | 2 | Austin Cindric (R) | Team Penske | Ford | 403 | 31 |
| 12 | 15 | 48 | Alex Bowman | Hendrick Motorsports | Chevrolet | 403 | 25 |
| 13 | 24 | 43 | Erik Jones | Petty GMS Motorsports | Chevrolet | 403 | 24 |
| 14 | 6 | 4 | Kevin Harvick | Stewart-Haas Racing | Ford | 403 | 29 |
| 15 | 4 | 17 | Chris Buescher | RFK Racing | Ford | 403 | 22 |
| 16 | 21 | 23 | Bubba Wallace | 23XI Racing | Toyota | 403 | 21 |
| 17 | 9 | 6 | Brad Keselowski | RFK Racing | Ford | 403 | 20 |
| 18 | 22 | 8 | Tyler Reddick | Richard Childress Racing | Chevrolet | 403 | 19 |
| 19 | 8 | 5 | Kyle Larson | Hendrick Motorsports | Chevrolet | 403 | 18 |
| 20 | 7 | 20 | Christopher Bell | Joe Gibbs Racing | Toyota | 402 | 26 |
| 21 | 3 | 41 | Cole Custer | Stewart-Haas Racing | Ford | 402 | 30 |
| 22 | 20 | 19 | Martin Truex Jr. | Joe Gibbs Racing | Toyota | 401 | 15 |
| 23 | 34 | 42 | Ty Dillon | Petty GMS Motorsports | Chevrolet | 401 | 14 |
| 24 | 36 | 16 | A. J. Allmendinger (i) | Kaulig Racing | Chevrolet | 401 | 0 |
| 25 | 16 | 34 | Michael McDowell | Front Row Motorsports | Ford | 400 | 12 |
| 26 | 29 | 21 | Harrison Burton (R) | Wood Brothers Racing | Ford | 400 | 11 |
| 27 | 28 | 47 | Ricky Stenhouse Jr. | JTG Daugherty Racing | Chevrolet | 400 | 10 |
| 28 | 25 | 11 | Denny Hamlin | Joe Gibbs Racing | Toyota | 400 | 9 |
| 29 | 30 | 99 | Daniel Suárez | Trackhouse Racing Team | Chevrolet | 399 | 8 |
| 30 | 10 | 38 | Todd Gilliland (R) | Front Row Motorsports | Ford | 399 | 7 |
| 31 | 17 | 31 | Justin Haley | Kaulig Racing | Chevrolet | 398 | 6 |
| 32 | 26 | 7 | Corey LaJoie | Spire Motorsports | Chevrolet | 397 | 5 |
| 33 | 35 | 51 | Cody Ware | Rick Ware Racing | Ford | 394 | 4 |
| 34 | 32 | 15 | J. J. Yeley (i) | Rick Ware Racing | Ford | 392 | 0 |
| 35 | 31 | 77 | Josh Bilicki (i) | Spire Motorsports | Chevrolet | 391 | 0 |
| 36 | 33 | 78 | B. J. McLeod | Live Fast Motorsports | Ford | 132 | 1 |
Official race results

=== Race statistics ===
- Lead changes: 5 among 4 different drivers
- Cautions/Laps: 4 for 36
- Red flags: 0
- Time of race: 2 hours, 40 minutes and 30 seconds
- Average speed: 79.244 miles per hour (127.531 km/h)

== Media ==
=== Television ===
Fox Sports covered their 22nd race at the Martinsville Speedway. Mike Joy, 2018 Spring Martinsville winner Clint Bowyer and seven-time NASCAR Cup Series winning crew chief Chad Knaus called the race from the broadcast booth. Jamie Little and Regan Smith handled pit road for the television side. Larry McReynolds and Jamie McMurray provided insight from the Fox Sports studio in Charlotte.

FS1
| Booth announcers | Pit reporters | In-race analysts |
|---|---|---|
| Lap-by-lap: Mike Joy; Color-commentator: Clint Bowyer; Color-commentator: Chad Knaus | Jamie Little; Regan Smith | Larry McReynolds; Jamie McMurray |

=== Radio ===
MRN had the radio call for the race which was also simulcasted on Sirius XM NASCAR Radio. Alex Hayden, Jeff Striegle and Rusty Wallace called the race in the booth when the field raced down the frontstretch. Dave Moody called the race from a platform inside the backstretch when the field races down the backstretch. Steve Post and Kim Coon worked pit road for the radio side.

MRN
| Booth announcers | Turn announcers | Pit reporters |
|---|---|---|
| Lead announcer: Alex Hayden; Announcer: Jeff Striegle; Announcer: Rusty Wallace | Backstretch: Dave Moody | Steve Post; Kim Coon |

== Standings after the race ==
Drivers' Championship standings

| | Pos | Driver | Points |
|---|---|---|---|
| 1 | 1 | Chase Elliott | 288 |
| 1 | 2 | Ryan Blaney | 285 (–3) |
| 1 | 3 | William Byron | 276 (–12) |
| 1 | 4 | Joey Logano | 261 (–27) |
| 1 | 5 | Ross Chastain | 246 (–42) |
| 1 | 6 | Alex Bowman | 237 (–51) |
| 4 | 7 | Martin Truex Jr. | 237 (–51) |
| 3 | 8 | Aric Almirola | 223 (–65) |
| 1 | 9 | Kevin Harvick | 222 (–66) |
| | 10 | Kyle Busch | 221 (–67) |
| 2 | 11 | Chase Briscoe | 220 (–68) |
| 1 | 12 | Tyler Reddick | 202 (–86) |
| 1 | 13 | Kyle Larson | 201 (–87) |
| 1 | 14 | Austin Cindric | 201 (–87) |
| 1 | 15 | Austin Dillon | 197 (–91) |
| 2 | 16 | Kurt Busch | 187 (–101) |
Official driver's standings

Manufacturers' Championship standings

| Pos | Manufacturer | Points |
|---|---|---|
| 1 | Chevrolet | 296 |
| 2 | Ford | 274 (–22) |
| 3 | Toyota | 268 (–28) |

- Note: Only the first 16 positions are included for the driver standings.
- . – Driver has clinched a position in the NASCAR Cup Series playoffs.

| Previous race: 2022 Toyota Owners 400 | NASCAR Cup Series; 2022 season | Next race: 2022 Food City Dirt Race |
