= 2022 GEICO 500 =

NASCAR Cup Series race

Race details
- Race 10 of 36 in the 2022 NASCAR Cup Series
- The 2022 GEICO 500 program cover.
- Date: April 24, 2022
- Location: Talladega Superspeedway in Lincoln, Alabama
- Course: Permanent racing facility
- Course length: 2.66 miles (4.28 km)
- Distance: 188 laps, 500.08 mi (804.64 km)
- Average speed: 148.637 miles per hour (239.208 km/h)

Pole position
| Driver | Christopher Bell | Joe Gibbs Racing |
- Time: 52.927

Most laps led
| Driver | William Byron | Hendrick Motorsports |
- Laps: 38

Winner
| No. 1 | Ross Chastain | Trackhouse Racing Team |

Television in the United States
- Network: Fox
- Announcers: Mike Joy, Clint Bowyer, and Dale Earnhardt Jr.

Radio in the United States
- Radio: MRN
- Booth announcers: Alex Hayden, Jeff Striegle, and Rusty Wallace
- Turn announcers: Dave Moody (1 & 2), Mike Bagley (Backstretch), and Dillon Welch (3 & 4)

The 2022 GEICO 500 was a NASCAR Cup Series race held on April 24, 2022, at Talladega Superspeedway in Lincoln, Alabama. Contested over 188 laps on the 2.66 mile (4.28 km) superspeedway, it was the 10th race of the 2022 NASCAR Cup Series season.

== Report ==
The layout of Talladega Superspeedway, the venue where the race was held.

=== Background ===
Talladega Superspeedway, formerly known as Alabama International Motor Speedway, is a motorsports complex located north of Talladega, Alabama. It is located on the former Anniston Air Force Base in the small city of Lincoln. A tri-oval, the track was constructed in 1969 by the International Speedway Corporation, a business controlled by the France family. Talladega is most known for its steep banking. The track currently hosts NASCAR's Cup Series, Xfinity Series and Camping World Truck Series. Talladega is the longest NASCAR oval with a length of 2.66-mile-long (4.28 km) tri-oval like the Daytona International Speedway, which is 2.5-mile-long (4.0 km). It was the final race of Greg Biffle's NASCAR career before his death in an aviation accident on December 18, 2025.

==== Entry list ====
- (R) denotes rookie driver.
- (i) denotes driver who is ineligible for series driver points.

| No. | Driver | Team | Manufacturer |
|---|---|---|---|
| 1 | Ross Chastain | Trackhouse Racing Team | Chevrolet |
| 2 | Austin Cindric (R) | Team Penske | Ford |
| 3 | Austin Dillon | Richard Childress Racing | Chevrolet |
| 4 | Kevin Harvick | Stewart-Haas Racing | Ford |
| 5 | Kyle Larson | Hendrick Motorsports | Chevrolet |
| 6 | Brad Keselowski | RFK Racing | Ford |
| 7 | Corey LaJoie | Spire Motorsports | Chevrolet |
| 8 | Tyler Reddick | Richard Childress Racing | Chevrolet |
| 9 | Chase Elliott | Hendrick Motorsports | Chevrolet |
| 10 | Aric Almirola | Stewart-Haas Racing | Ford |
| 11 | Denny Hamlin | Joe Gibbs Racing | Toyota |
| 12 | Ryan Blaney | Team Penske | Ford |
| 14 | Chase Briscoe | Stewart-Haas Racing | Ford |
| 15 | David Ragan | Rick Ware Racing | Ford |
| 16 | Daniel Hemric (i) | Kaulig Racing | Chevrolet |
| 17 | Chris Buescher | RFK Racing | Ford |
| 18 | Kyle Busch | Joe Gibbs Racing | Toyota |
| 19 | Martin Truex Jr. | Joe Gibbs Racing | Toyota |
| 20 | Christopher Bell | Joe Gibbs Racing | Toyota |
| 21 | Harrison Burton (R) | Wood Brothers Racing | Ford |
| 22 | Joey Logano | Team Penske | Ford |
| 23 | Bubba Wallace | 23XI Racing | Toyota |
| 24 | William Byron | Hendrick Motorsports | Chevrolet |
| 31 | Justin Haley | Kaulig Racing | Chevrolet |
| 34 | Michael McDowell | Front Row Motorsports | Ford |
| 38 | Todd Gilliland (R) | Front Row Motorsports | Ford |
| 41 | Cole Custer | Stewart-Haas Racing | Ford |
| 42 | Ty Dillon | Petty GMS Motorsports | Chevrolet |
| 43 | Erik Jones | Petty GMS Motorsports | Chevrolet |
| 44 | Greg Biffle | NY Racing Team | Chevrolet |
| 45 | Kurt Busch | 23XI Racing | Toyota |
| 47 | Ricky Stenhouse Jr. | JTG Daugherty Racing | Chevrolet |
| 48 | Alex Bowman | Hendrick Motorsports | Chevrolet |
| 51 | Cody Ware | Rick Ware Racing | Ford |
| 55 | J. J. Yeley (i) | MBM Motorsports | Ford |
| 62 | Noah Gragson (i) | Beard Motorsports | Chevrolet |
| 77 | Landon Cassill (i) | Spire Motorsports | Chevrolet |
| 78 | B. J. McLeod | Live Fast Motorsports | Ford |
| 99 | Daniel Suárez | Trackhouse Racing Team | Chevrolet |
Official entry list

== Qualifying ==
Christopher Bell scored the pole for the race with a time of 52.927 and a speed of 180.928 mph (291.175 km/h).

=== Qualifying results ===
| Pos | No. | Driver | Team | Manufacturer | R1 | R2 |
|---|---|---|---|---|---|---|
| 1 | 20 | Christopher Bell | Joe Gibbs Racing | Toyota | 53.152 | 52.927 |
| 2 | 19 | Martin Truex Jr. | Joe Gibbs Racing | Toyota | 53.228 | 53.008 |
| 3 | 16 | Daniel Hemric (i) | Kaulig Racing | Chevrolet | 53.493 | 53.221 |
| 4 | 99 | Daniel Suárez | Trackhouse Racing Team | Chevrolet | 53.345 | 53.234 |
| 5 | 5 | Kyle Larson | Hendrick Motorsports | Chevrolet | 53.348 | 53.254 |
| 6 | 45 | Kurt Busch | 23XI Racing | Toyota | 53.270 | 53.255 |
| 7 | 11 | Denny Hamlin | Joe Gibbs Racing | Toyota | 53.440 | 53.308 |
| 8 | 24 | William Byron | Hendrick Motorsports | Chevrolet | 53.483 | 53.316 |
| 9 | 23 | Bubba Wallace | 23XI Racing | Toyota | 53.310 | 53.336 |
| 10 | 8 | Tyler Reddick | Richard Childress Racing | Chevrolet | 53.513 | 53.399 |
| 11 | 31 | Justin Haley | Kaulig Racing | Chevrolet | 53.514 | — |
| 12 | 18 | Kyle Busch | Joe Gibbs Racing | Toyota | 53.515 | — |
| 13 | 22 | Joey Logano | Team Penske | Ford | 53.572 | — |
| 14 | 3 | Austin Dillon | Richard Childress Racing | Chevrolet | 53.602 | — |
| 15 | 6 | Brad Keselowski | RFK Racing | Ford | 53.626 | — |
| 16 | 43 | Erik Jones | Petty GMS Motorsports | Chevrolet | 53.628 | — |
| 17 | 14 | Chase Briscoe | Stewart-Haas Racing | Ford | 53.635 | — |
| 18 | 2 | Austin Cindric (R) | Team Penske | Ford | 53.653 | — |
| 19 | 1 | Ross Chastain | Trackhouse Racing Team | Chevrolet | 53.657 | — |
| 20 | 42 | Ty Dillon | Petty GMS Motorsports | Chevrolet | 53.689 | — |
| 21 | 34 | Michael McDowell | Front Row Motorsports | Ford | 53.708 | — |
| 22 | 12 | Ryan Blaney | Team Penske | Ford | 53.743 | — |
| 23 | 10 | Aric Almirola | Stewart-Haas Racing | Ford | 53.744 | — |
| 24 | 4 | Kevin Harvick | Stewart-Haas Racing | Ford | 53.751 | — |
| 25 | 21 | Harrison Burton (R) | Wood Brothers Racing | Ford | 53.764 | — |
| 26 | 47 | Ricky Stenhouse Jr. | JTG Daugherty Racing | Chevrolet | 53.802 | — |
| 27 | 48 | Alex Bowman | Hendrick Motorsports | Chevrolet | 53.813 | — |
| 28 | 9 | Chase Elliott | Hendrick Motorsports | Chevrolet | 53.940 | — |
| 29 | 41 | Cole Custer | Stewart-Haas Racing | Ford | 53.943 | — |
| 30 | 17 | Chris Buescher | RFK Racing | Ford | 53.964 | — |
| 31 | 62 | Noah Gragson (i) | Beard Motorsports | Chevrolet | 53.989 | — |
| 32 | 38 | Todd Gilliland (R) | Front Row Motorsports | Ford | 54.178 | — |
| 33 | 7 | Corey LaJoie | Spire Motorsports | Chevrolet | 54.205 | — |
| 34 | 51 | Cody Ware | Rick Ware Racing | Ford | 54.677 | — |
| 35 | 44 | Greg Biffle | NY Racing Team | Chevrolet | 54.791 | — |
| 36 | 15 | David Ragan | Rick Ware Racing | Ford | 55.118 | — |
| 37 | 78 | B. J. McLeod | Live Fast Motorsports | Ford | 55.129 | — |
| 38 | 55 | J. J. Yeley (i) | MBM Motorsports | Ford | 55.662 | — |
| 39 | 77 | Landon Cassill (i) | Spire Motorsports | Chevrolet | 0.000 | — |
Official qualifying results

== Race ==
=== Stage Results ===
Stage One Laps: 60

| Pos | No | Driver | Team | Manufacturer | Points |
|---|---|---|---|---|---|
| 1 | 23 | Bubba Wallace | 23XI Racing | Toyota | 10 |
| 2 | 5 | Kyle Larson | Hendrick Motorsports | Chevrolet | 9 |
| 3 | 20 | Christopher Bell | Joe Gibbs Racing | Toyota | 8 |
| 4 | 24 | William Byron | Hendrick Motorsports | Chevrolet | 7 |
| 5 | 19 | Martin Truex Jr. | Joe Gibbs Racing | Toyota | 6 |
| 6 | 9 | Chase Elliott | Hendrick Motorsports | Chevrolet | 5 |
| 7 | 45 | Kurt Busch | 23XI Racing | Toyota | 4 |
| 8 | 43 | Erik Jones | Petty GMS Motorsports | Chevrolet | 3 |
| 9 | 48 | Alex Bowman | Hendrick Motorsports | Chevrolet | 2 |
| 10 | 47 | Ricky Stenhouse Jr. | JTG Daugherty Racing | Chevrolet | 1 |
Official stage one results

Stage Two Laps: 60

| Pos | No | Driver | Team | Manufacturer | Points |
|---|---|---|---|---|---|
| 1 | 24 | William Byron | Hendrick Motorsports | Chevrolet | 10 |
| 2 | 9 | Chase Elliott | Hendrick Motorsports | Chevrolet | 9 |
| 3 | 5 | Kyle Larson | Hendrick Motorsports | Chevrolet | 8 |
| 4 | 19 | Martin Truex Jr. | Joe Gibbs Racing | Toyota | 7 |
| 5 | 48 | Alex Bowman | Hendrick Motorsports | Chevrolet | 6 |
| 6 | 18 | Kyle Busch | Joe Gibbs Racing | Toyota | 5 |
| 7 | 10 | Aric Almirola | Stewart-Haas Racing | Ford | 4 |
| 8 | 43 | Erik Jones | Petty GMS Motorsports | Chevrolet | 3 |
| 9 | 1 | Ross Chastain | Trackhouse Racing Team | Chevrolet | 2 |
| 10 | 45 | Kurt Busch | 23XI Racing | Toyota | 1 |
Official stage two results

=== Final Stage Results ===
Stage Three Laps: 68

| Pos | Grid | No | Driver | Team | Manufacturer | Laps | Points |
|---|---|---|---|---|---|---|---|
| 1 | 19 | 1 | Ross Chastain | Trackhouse Racing Team | Chevrolet | 188 | 42 |
| 2 | 14 | 3 | Austin Dillon | Richard Childress Racing | Chevrolet | 188 | 35 |
| 3 | 12 | 18 | Kyle Busch | Joe Gibbs Racing | Toyota | 188 | 39 |
| 4 | 5 | 5 | Kyle Larson | Hendrick Motorsports | Chevrolet | 188 | 50 |
| 5 | 2 | 19 | Martin Truex Jr. | Joe Gibbs Racing | Toyota | 188 | 45 |
| 6 | 16 | 43 | Erik Jones | Petty GMS Motorsports | Chevrolet | 188 | 37 |
| 7 | 28 | 9 | Chase Elliott | Hendrick Motorsports | Chevrolet | 188 | 44 |
| 8 | 21 | 34 | Michael McDowell | Front Row Motorsports | Ford | 188 | 29 |
| 9 | 27 | 48 | Alex Bowman | Hendrick Motorsports | Chevrolet | 188 | 36 |
| 10 | 24 | 4 | Kevin Harvick | Stewart-Haas Racing | Ford | 188 | 27 |
| 11 | 22 | 12 | Ryan Blaney | Team Penske | Ford | 188 | 26 |
| 12 | 11 | 31 | Justin Haley | Kaulig Racing | Chevrolet | 188 | 25 |
| 13 | 23 | 10 | Aric Almirola | Stewart-Haas Racing | Ford | 188 | 28 |
| 14 | 33 | 7 | Corey LaJoie | Spire Motorsports | Chevrolet | 188 | 23 |
| 15 | 8 | 24 | William Byron | Hendrick Motorsports | Chevrolet | 188 | 39 |
| 16 | 6 | 45 | Kurt Busch | 23XI Racing | Toyota | 188 | 26 |
| 17 | 9 | 23 | Bubba Wallace | 23XI Racing | Toyota | 188 | 30 |
| 18 | 7 | 11 | Denny Hamlin | Joe Gibbs Racing | Toyota | 188 | 19 |
| 19 | 39 | 77 | Landon Cassill (i) | Spire Motorsports | Chevrolet | 188 | 0 |
| 20 | 31 | 62 | Noah Gragson (i) | Beard Motorsports | Chevrolet | 188 | 0 |
| 21 | 18 | 2 | Austin Cindric (R) | Team Penske | Ford | 188 | 16 |
| 22 | 1 | 20 | Christopher Bell | Joe Gibbs Racing | Toyota | 187 | 23 |
| 23 | 15 | 6 | Brad Keselowski | RFK Racing | Ford | 187 | 14 |
| 24 | 36 | 15 | David Ragan | Rick Ware Racing | Ford | 186 | 13 |
| 25 | 38 | 55 | J. J. Yeley (i) | MBM Motorsports | Ford | 185 | 0 |
| 26 | 37 | 78 | B. J. McLeod | Live Fast Motorsports | Ford | 172 | 11 |
| 27 | 32 | 38 | Todd Gilliland (R) | Front Row Motorsports | Ford | 121 | 10 |
| 28 | 34 | 51 | Cody Ware | Rick Ware Racing | Ford | 105 | 9 |
| 29 | 29 | 41 | Cole Custer | Stewart-Haas Racing | Ford | 98 | 8 |
| 30 | 26 | 47 | Ricky Stenhouse Jr. | JTG Daugherty Racing | Chevrolet | 95 | 8 |
| 31 | 4 | 99 | Daniel Suárez | Trackhouse Racing Team | Chevrolet | 92 | 6 |
| 32 | 13 | 22 | Joey Logano | Team Penske | Ford | 89 | 5 |
| 33 | 20 | 42 | Ty Dillon | Petty GMS Motorsports | Chevrolet | 89 | 4 |
| 34 | 25 | 21 | Harrison Burton (R) | Wood Brothers Racing | Ford | 89 | 3 |
| 35 | 35 | 44 | Greg Biffle | NY Racing Team | Chevrolet | 79 | 2 |
| 36 | 3 | 16 | Daniel Hemric (i) | Kaulig Racing | Chevrolet | 56 | 0 |
| 37 | 17 | 14 | Chase Briscoe | Stewart-Haas Racing | Ford | 56 | 1 |
| 38 | 30 | 17 | Chris Buescher | RFK Racing | Ford | 56 | 1 |
| 39 | 10 | 8 | Tyler Reddick | Richard Childress Racing | Chevrolet | 31 | 1 |
Official race results

=== Race statistics ===
- Lead changes: 41 among 16 different drivers
- Cautions/Laps: 6 for 28
- Red flags: 0
- Time of race: 3 hours, 21 minutes and 52 seconds
- Average speed: 148.637 miles per hour (239.208 km/h)

== Media ==
=== Television ===
Fox Sports covered their 22nd race at the Talladega Superspeedway. Mike Joy, Clint Bowyer and six-time Talladega winner Dale Earnhardt Jr. called the race from the broadcast booth. Jamie Little, Regan Smith and Vince Welch handled pit road for the television side. Larry McReynolds and Jamie McMurray provided insight from the Fox Sports studio in Charlotte.

Fox
| Booth announcers | Pit reporters | In-race analysts |
|---|---|---|
| Lap-by-lap: Mike Joy; Color-commentator: Clint Bowyer; Color-commentator: Dale Earnhardt Jr. | Jamie Little; Regan Smith; Vince Welch | Larry McReynolds; Jamie McMurray |

=== Radio ===
MRN had the radio call for the race which was also simulcast on Sirius XM NASCAR Radio. Alex Hayden, Jeff Striegle, and Rusty Wallace called the race in the booth when the field raced through the tri-oval. Dave Moody called the race from the Sunoco spotters stand outside turn 2 when the field raced through turns 1 and 2. Mike Bagley called the race from a platform inside the backstretch when the field raced down the backstretch. Dillon Welch called the race from the Sunoco spotters stand outside turn 4 when the field races through turns 3 and 4. Steve Post, Jason Toy and Chris Wilner worked pit road for the radio side.

MRN Radio
| Booth announcers | Turn announcers | Pit reporters |
|---|---|---|
| Lead announcer: Alex Hayden; Announcer: Jeff Striegle; Announcer: Rusty Wallace | Turns 1 & 2: Dave Moody; Backstretch: Mike Bagley; Turns 3 & 4: Dillon Welch | Steve Post; Jason Toy; Chris Wilner |

== Standings after the race ==
Drivers' Championship standings

| | Pos | Driver | Points |
|---|---|---|---|
| | 1 | Chase Elliott | 368 |
| | 2 | Ryan Blaney | 347 (–21) |
| 1 | 3 | William Byron | 334 (–34) |
| 2 | 4 | Kyle Busch | 312 (–56) |
| | 5 | Alex Bowman | 309 (–59) |
| 3 | 6 | Joey Logano | 308 (–60) |
| 2 | 7 | Kyle Larson | 299 (–69) |
| 1 | 8 | Martin Truex Jr. | 298 (–70) |
| 1 | 9 | Ross Chastain | 292 (–76) |
| 2 | 10 | Aric Almirola | 265 (–103) |
| 2 | 11 | Kevin Harvick | 252 (–116) |
| 2 | 12 | Chase Briscoe | 246 (–122) |
| 4 | 13 | Austin Dillon | 245 (–123) |
| 1 | 14 | Christopher Bell | 243 (–125) |
| 4 | 15 | Tyler Reddick | 242 (–126) |
| 2 | 16 | Austin Cindric | 238 (–130) |
Official driver's standings

Manufacturers' Championship standings

| | Pos | Manufacturer | Points |
|---|---|---|---|
| | 1 | Chevrolet | 371 |
| 1 | 2 | Toyota | 341 (–30) |
| 1 | 3 | Ford | 337 (–34) |

- Note: Only the first 16 positions are included for the driver standings.
- . – Driver has clinched a position in the NASCAR Cup Series playoffs.

| Previous race: 2022 Food City Dirt Race | NASCAR Cup Series; 2022 season | Next race: 2022 DuraMAX Drydene 400 |
