= 2022 NASCAR Xfinity Series Championship Race =

33rd race of the 2022 NASCAR Xfinity Series

Race details
- Race 33 of 33 of the 2022 NASCAR Xfinity Series
- Date: November 5, 2022
- Official name: 25th Annual NASCAR Xfinity Series Championship Race
- Location: Phoenix Raceway, Avondale, Arizona
- Course: Permanent racing facility
- Course length: 1 miles (1.6 km)
- Distance: 200 laps, 200 mi (320 km)
- Average speed: 91.174 mph (146.730 km/h)

Pole position
Driver	Ty Gibbs	Joe Gibbs Racing
- Time: 26.806

Most laps led
Driver	Ty Gibbs	Joe Gibbs Racing
- Laps: 125

Winner
No. 54	Ty Gibbs	Joe Gibbs Racing

Television in the United States
- Network: NBC
- Announcers: Rick Allen, Jeff Burton and Steve Letarte

Radio in the United States
- Radio: Motor Racing Network

The 2022 NASCAR Xfinity Series Championship Race was the 33rd and final stock car race of the 2022 NASCAR Xfinity Series, the Championship 4 race, and the 25th iteration of the event. The race was held on Saturday, November 5, 2022, in Avondale, Arizona at Phoenix Raceway, a 1 mile (1.6 km) permanent tri-oval shaped racetrack. The race took the scheduled 200 laps to complete. Ty Gibbs, driving for Joe Gibbs Racing, put on a dominating performance, leading 125 laps, and held off Noah Gragson in the final few laps for his eleventh career NASCAR Xfinity Series win, and his seventh of the season. To fill out the podium, Justin Allgaier, driving for JR Motorsports, would finish in 3rd, respectively.

In addition to winning the race, Gibbs would also claim the 2022 NASCAR Xfinity Series championship. This was Gibbs' first championship in the Xfinity Series, and the second championship in a row for Joe Gibbs Racing.

== Background ==
Phoenix Raceway is a 1-mile, low-banked tri-oval race track located in Avondale, Arizona, near Phoenix. The motorsport track opened in 1964 and currently hosts two NASCAR race weekends annually including the final championship race since 2020. Phoenix Raceway has also hosted the CART, IndyCar Series, USAC and the WeatherTech SportsCar Championship. The raceway is currently owned and operated by NASCAR.

Phoenix Raceway is home to two annual NASCAR race weekends, one of 13 facilities on the NASCAR schedule to host more than one race weekend a year. It first joined the NASCAR Cup Series schedule in 1988 as a late season event, and in 2005 the track was given a spring date. The now-NASCAR Camping World Truck Series was added in 1995 and the now-NASCAR Xfinity Series began running there in 1999.

NASCAR announced that its championship weekend events would be run at Phoenix for 2020, marking the first time since NASCAR inaugurated the weekend that Homestead-Miami Speedway would not be the host track. The track will also hold the championship for the 2021 NASCAR Cup season.

=== Championship drivers ===
- Noah Gragson advanced by winning at Homestead-Miami.
- Ty Gibbs advanced by winning at Martinsville.
- Josh Berry advanced by winning at Las Vegas.
- Justin Allgaier advanced by virtue of points.

=== Entry list ===
- (R) denotes rookie driver.
- (i) denotes driver who are ineligible for series driver points.

#	Driver	Team	Make
1	Sam Mayer	JR Motorsports	Chevrolet
02	Parker Retzlaff	Our Motorsports	Chevrolet
2	Sheldon Creed (R)	Richard Childress Racing	Chevrolet
4	Bayley Currey	JD Motorsports	Chevrolet
5	Matt Mills (i)	B. J. McLeod Motorsports	Chevrolet
6	Brennan Poole (i)	JD Motorsports	Chevrolet
07	Joe Graf Jr.	SS-Green Light Racing	Ford
7	Justin Allgaier	JR Motorsports	Chevrolet
08	Brandon Brown	SS-Green Light Racing	Ford
8	Josh Berry	JR Motorsports	Chevrolet
9	Noah Gragson	JR Motorsports	Chevrolet
10	Landon Cassill	Kaulig Racing	Chevrolet
11	Daniel Hemric	Kaulig Racing	Chevrolet
13	Dawson Cram	MBM Motorsports	Ford
16	A. J. Allmendinger	Kaulig Racing	Chevrolet
18	Sammy Smith	Joe Gibbs Racing	Toyota
19	Brandon Jones	Joe Gibbs Racing	Toyota
21	Austin Hill (R)	Richard Childress Racing	Chevrolet
23	Anthony Alfredo	Our Motorsports	Chevrolet
26	Kaz Grala (i)	Sam Hunt Racing	Toyota
27	Jeb Burton	Our Motorsports	Chevrolet
31	Myatt Snider	Jordan Anderson Racing	Chevrolet
34	Kyle Weatherman	Jesse Iwuji Motorsports	Chevrolet
35	Joey Gase	Emerling-Gase Motorsports	Toyota
36	Josh Williams	DGM Racing	Chevrolet
38	Kyle Sieg	RSS Racing	Ford
39	Ryan Sieg	RSS Racing	Ford
44	Rajah Caruth (i)	Alpha Prime Racing	Chevrolet
45	Stefan Parsons (i)	Alpha Prime Racing	Chevrolet
48	Nick Sanchez	Big Machine Racing	Chevrolet
51	Jeremy Clements	Jeremy Clements Racing	Chevrolet
54	Ty Gibbs	Joe Gibbs Racing	Toyota
66	J. J. Yeley	MBM Motorsports	Ford
68	Kris Wright	Brandonbilt Motorsports	Chevrolet
77	Dillon Bassett	Bassett Racing	Chevrolet
78	B. J. McLeod	B. J. McLeod Motorsports	Chevrolet
91	Mason Massey	DGM Racing	Chevrolet
92	Alex Labbé	DGM Racing	Chevrolet
98	Riley Herbst	Stewart-Haas Racing	Ford
Official entry list

== Practice ==
The only 50-minute practice session was held on Friday, November 4, at 4:05 PM MST. Sammy Smith, driving for Joe Gibbs Racing, would set the fastest time in the session, with a lap of 27.454, and an average speed of 131.128 mph (211.030 km/h).

Pos.	#	Driver	Team	Make	Time	Speed
1	18	Sammy Smith	Joe Gibbs Racing	Toyota	27.454	131.128
2	19	Brandon Jones	Joe Gibbs Racing	Toyota	27.569	130.581
3	54	Ty Gibbs	Joe Gibbs Racing	Toyota	27.582	130.520
Full practice results

== Qualifying ==
Qualifying was held on Saturday, November 5, at 11:30 AM MST. Since Phoenix Raceway is a tri-oval track, the qualifying system used is a single-car, one-lap system with only one round. Whoever sets the fastest time in the round wins the pole. Ty Gibbs, driving for Joe Gibbs Racing, would score the pole for the race, with a lap of 26.806, and an average speed of 134.298 mph (216.132 km/h).

Pos.	#	Driver	Team	Make	Time	Speed
1	54	Ty Gibbs	Joe Gibbs Racing	Toyota	26.806	134.298
2	18	Sammy Smith	Joe Gibbs Racing	Toyota	26.854	134.058
3	48	Nick Sanchez	Big Machine Racing	Chevrolet	26.978	133.442
4	9	Noah Gragson	JR Motorsports	Chevrolet	26.985	133.407
5	19	Brandon Jones	Joe Gibbs Racing	Toyota	26.987	133.398
6	10	Landon Cassill	Kaulig Racing	Chevrolet	27.066	133.008
7	39	Ryan Sieg	RSS Racing	Ford	27.074	132.969
8	2	Sheldon Creed (R)	Richard Childress Racing	Chevrolet	27.087	132.905
9	8	Josh Berry	JR Motorsports	Chevrolet	27.134	132.675
10	11	Daniel Hemric	Kaulig Racing	Chevrolet	27.146	132.616
11	7	Justin Allgaier	JR Motorsports	Chevrolet	27.164	132.528
12	77	Dillon Bassett	Bassett Racing	Chevrolet	27.174	132.480
13	1	Sam Mayer	JR Motorsports	Chevrolet	27.187	132.416
14	21	Austin Hill (R)	Richard Childress Racing	Chevrolet	27.190	132.402
15	45	Stefan Parsons (i)	Alpha Prime Racing	Chevrolet	27.261	132.057
16	16	A. J. Allmendinger	Kaulig Racing	Chevrolet	27.286	131.936
17	02	Parker Retzlaff	Our Motorsports	Chevrolet	27.330	131.723
18	26	Kaz Grala (i)	Sam Hunt Racing	Toyota	27.337	131.690
19	98	Riley Herbst	Stewart-Haas Racing	Ford	27.410	131.339
20	4	Bayley Currey	JD Motorsports	Chevrolet	27.410	131.339
21	27	Jeb Burton	Our Motorsports	Chevrolet	27.414	131.320
22	38	Kyle Sieg	RSS Racing	Ford	27.473	131.038
23	23	Anthony Alfredo	Our Motorsports	Chevrolet	27.510	130.862
24	78	B. J. McLeod	B. J. McLeod Motorsports	Chevrolet	27.517	130.828
25	35	Joey Gase	Emerling-Gase Motorsports	Toyota	27.579	130.534
26	6	Brennan Poole (i)	JD Motorsports	Chevrolet	27.590	130.482
27	08	Brandon Brown	SS-Green Light Racing	Ford	27.605	130.411
28	51	Jeremy Clements	Jeremy Clements Racing	Chevrolet	27.608	130.397
29	66	J. J. Yeley	MBM Motorsports	Ford	27.644	130.227
30	36	Josh Williams	DGM Racing	Chevrolet	27.659	130.157
31	68	Kris Wright	Brandonbilt Motorsports	Chevrolet	27.664	130.133
32	13	Dawson Cram	MBM Motorsports	Ford	27.745	129.753
33	92	Alex Labbé	DGM Racing	Chevrolet	27.777	129.604
Qualified by owner's points
34	91	Mason Massey	DGM Racing	Chevrolet	27.810	129.450
35	34	Kyle Weatherman	Jesse Iwuji Motorsports	Chevrolet	28.000	128.571
36	31	Myatt Snider	Jordan Anderson Racing	Chevrolet	28.023	128.466
37	44	Rajah Caruth (i)	Alpha Prime Racing	Chevrolet	28.337	127.042
38	07	Joe Graf Jr.	SS-Green Light Racing	Ford	28.845	124.805
Failed to qualify
39	5	Matt Mills (i)	B. J. McLeod Motorsports	Chevrolet	28.806	124.974
Official qualifying results
Official starting lineup

== Race results ==
Stage 1 Laps: 45

Pos.	#	Driver	Team	Make	Pts
1	54	Ty Gibbs	Joe Gibbs Racing	Toyota	0
2	9	Noah Gragson	JR Motorsports	Chevrolet	0
3	7	Justin Allgaier	JR Motorsports	Chevrolet	0
4	8	Josh Berry	JR Motorsports	Chevrolet	0
5	10	Landon Cassill	Kaulig Racing	Chevrolet	6
6	2	Sheldon Creed (R)	Richard Childress Racing	Chevrolet	5
7	48	Nick Sanchez	Big Machine Racing	Chevrolet	4
8	18	Sammy Smith	Joe Gibbs Racing	Toyota	3
9	19	Brandon Jones	Joe Gibbs Racing	Toyota	2
10	16	A. J. Allmendinger	Kaulig Racing	Chevrolet	1

Stage 2 Laps: 45

Pos.	#	Driver	Team	Make	Pts
1	54	Ty Gibbs	Joe Gibbs Racing	Toyota	0
2	7	Justin Allgaier	JR Motorsports	Chevrolet	0
3	9	Noah Gragson	JR Motorsports	Chevrolet	0
4	18	Sammy Smith	Joe Gibbs Racing	Toyota	7
5	10	Landon Cassill	Kaulig Racing	Chevrolet	6
6	1	Sam Mayer	JR Motorsports	Chevrolet	5
7	19	Brandon Jones	Joe Gibbs Racing	Toyota	4
8	16	A. J. Allmendinger	Kaulig Racing	Chevrolet	3
9	2	Sheldon Creed (R)	Richard Childress Racing	Chevrolet	2
10	8	Josh Berry	JR Motorsports	Chevrolet	0

Stage 3 Laps: 110

Fin.	St	#	Driver	Team	Make	Laps	Led	Status	Pts
1	1	54	Ty Gibbs	Joe Gibbs Racing	Toyota	200	125	Running	40
2	4	9	Noah Gragson	JR Motorsports	Chevrolet	200	35	Running	35
3	11	7	Justin Allgaier	JR Motorsports	Chevrolet	200	26	Running	34
4	6	10	Landon Cassill	Kaulig Racing	Chevrolet	200	0	Running	45
5	16	16	A. J. Allmendinger	Kaulig Racing	Chevrolet	200	0	Running	36
6	8	2	Sheldon Creed (R)	Richard Childress Racing	Chevrolet	200	0	Running	38
7	19	98	Riley Herbst	Stewart-Haas Racing	Ford	200	0	Running	30
8	10	11	Daniel Hemric	Kaulig Racing	Chevrolet	200	0	Running	29
9	14	21	Austin Hill (R)	Richard Childress Racing	Chevrolet	200	0	Running	28
10	2	18	Sammy Smith	Joe Gibbs Racing	Toyota	200	10	Running	37
11	5	19	Brandon Jones	Joe Gibbs Racing	Toyota	200	0	Running	32
12	3	48	Nick Sanchez	Big Machine Racing	Chevrolet	200	4	Running	29
13	9	8	Josh Berry	JR Motorsports	Chevrolet	200	0	Running	24
14	35	34	Kyle Weatherman	Jesse Iwuji Motorsports	Chevrolet	200	0	Running	23
15	30	36	Josh Williams	DGM Racing	Chevrolet	200	0	Running	22
16	21	27	Jeb Burton	Our Motorsports	Chevrolet	200	0	Running	21
17	37	44	Rajah Caruth (i)	Alpha Prime Racing	Chevrolet	200	0	Running	0
18	33	92	Alex Labbé	DGM Racing	Chevrolet	200	0	Running	19
19	20	4	Bayley Currey	JD Motorsports	Chevrolet	200	0	Running	18
20	7	39	Ryan Sieg	RSS Racing	Ford	200	0	Running	17
21	17	02	Parker Retzlaff	Our Motorsports	Chevrolet	200	0	Running	16
22	22	38	Kyle Sieg	RSS Racing	Ford	200	0	Running	15
23	18	26	Kaz Grala (i)	Sam Hunt Racing	Toyota	200	0	Running	0
24	25	35	Joey Gase	Emerling-Gase Motorsports	Toyota	200	0	Running	13
25	36	31	Myatt Snider	Jordan Anderson Racing	Chevrolet	200	0	Running	12
26	31	68	Kris Wright	Brandonbilt Motorsports	Chevrolet	200	0	Running	11
27	28	51	Jeremy Clements	Jeremy Clements Racing	Chevrolet	200	0	Running	10
28	15	45	Stefan Parsons (i)	Alpha Prime Racing	Chevrolet	199	0	Running	0
29	26	6	Brennan Poole (i)	JD Motorsports	Chevrolet	198	0	Running	0
30	29	66	J. J. Yeley	MBM Motorsports	Ford	197	0	Running	7
31	32	13	Dawson Cram	MBM Motorsports	Ford	196	0	Running	6
32	24	78	B. J. McLeod	B. J. McLeod Motorsports	Chevrolet	196	0	Running	5
33	34	91	Mason Massey	DGM Racing	Chevrolet	196	0	Running	4
34	13	1	Sam Mayer	JR Motorsports	Chevrolet	195	0	Running	3
35	23	23	Anthony Alfredo	Our Motorsports	Chevrolet	194	0	Running	2
36	38	07	Joe Graf Jr.	SS-Green Light Racing	Ford	193	0	Running	1
37	27	08	Brandon Brown	SS-Green Light Racing	Ford	154	0	Suspension	1
38	12	77	Dillon Bassett	Bassett Racing	Chevrolet	152	0	Engine	1
Official race results

== Standings after the race ==
Drivers' Championship standings

	Pos	Driver	Points
1	1	Ty Gibbs	4,040
1	2	Noah Gragson	4,035 (-5)
1	3	Justin Allgaier	4,034 (-6)
1	4	Josh Berry	4,024 (-16)
	5	A. J. Allmendinger	2,333 (-1,707)
	6	Austin Hill	2,273 (-1,767)
	7	Sam Mayer	2,239 (-1,801)
1	8	Brandon Jones	2,221 (-1,819)
1	9	Daniel Hemric	2,220 (-1,820)
	10	Riley Herbst	2,197 (-1,843)
	11	Ryan Sieg	2,126 (-1,914)
	12	Jeremy Clements	2,069 (-1,971)
Official driver's standings

- Note: Only the first 12 positions are included for the driver standings.

Previous race: 2022 Dead On Tools 250	NASCAR Xfinity Series; 2022 season	Next race: 2023 Beef. It's What's for Dinner. 300
