= 2022 Kansas Lottery 300 =

25th race of the 2022 NASCAR Xfinity Series

Race details
- Race 25 of 33 in the 2022 NASCAR Xfinity Series
- Date: September 10, 2022
- Official name: 22nd Annual Kansas Lottery 300
- Location: Kansas City, Kansas, Kansas Speedway
- Course: Permanent racing facility
- Course length: 1.5 miles (2.41 km)
- Distance: 93 laps, 139.5 mi (224.503 km)
- Scheduled distance: 200 laps, 300 mi (482.803 km)
- Average speed: 113.697 mph (182.978 km/h)

Pole position
Driver	Brandon Jones	Joe Gibbs Racing
- Time: 30.911

Most laps led
Driver	Ty Gibbs	Joe Gibbs Racing
- Laps: 66

Winner
No. 9	Noah Gragson	JR Motorsports

Television in the United States
- Network: USA Network
- Announcers: Rick Allen, Jeff Burton, and Steve Letarte

Radio in the United States
- Radio: Motor Racing Network

The 2022 Kansas Lottery 300 was the 25th stock car race of the 2022 NASCAR Xfinity Series and the 22nd iteration of the event. The race was held on Saturday, September 10, 2022, in Kansas City, Kansas at Kansas Speedway, a 1.500 miles (2.414 km) permanent paved oval-shaped racetrack. The race was decreased from 200 laps to 93 laps, due to inclement weather. Noah Gragson, driving for JR Motorsports, took advantage of the lead on the final restart, and held off his teammate, Justin Allgaier, for his 10th career NASCAR Xfinity Series win, along with his fifth of the season. Ty Gibbs would mostly dominate the race, leading 66 laps. To fill out the podium, Gibbs, driving for Joe Gibbs Racing, would finish 3rd, respectively.

== Background ==
Kansas Speedway is a 1.5-mile (2.4 km) tri-oval race track in Kansas City, Kansas. It was built in 2001 and hosts two annual NASCAR race weekends. The NTT IndyCar Series also raced there until 2011. The speedway is owned and operated by the International Speedway Corporation.

=== Entry list ===
- (R) denotes rookie driver.
- (i) denotes driver who are ineligible for series driver points.

#	Driver	Team	Make
1	Sam Mayer	JR Motorsports	Chevrolet
02	Brandon Brown	Our Motorsports	Chevrolet
2	Sheldon Creed (R)	Richard Childress Racing	Chevrolet
4	Bayley Currey	JD Motorsports	Chevrolet
5	Garrett Smithley	B. J. McLeod Motorsports	Chevrolet
6	Ryan Vargas	JD Motorsports	Chevrolet
07	Brett Moffitt	SS-Green Light Racing	Ford
7	Justin Allgaier	JR Motorsports	Chevrolet
08	David Starr	SS-Green Light Racing	Ford
8	Josh Berry	JR Motorsports	Chevrolet
9	Noah Gragson	JR Motorsports	Chevrolet
10	Landon Cassill	Kaulig Racing	Chevrolet
11	Daniel Hemric	Kaulig Racing	Chevrolet
13	Akinori Ogata (i)	MBM Motorsports	Ford
16	A. J. Allmendinger	Kaulig Racing	Chevrolet
18	Sammy Smith	Joe Gibbs Racing	Toyota
19	Brandon Jones	Joe Gibbs Racing	Toyota
21	Austin Hill (R)	Richard Childress Racing	Chevrolet
23	Anthony Alfredo	Our Motorsports	Chevrolet
26	Derek Griffith	Sam Hunt Racing	Toyota
27	Jeb Burton	Our Motorsports	Chevrolet
31	Myatt Snider	Jordan Anderson Racing	Chevrolet
34	Jesse Iwuji	Jesse Iwuji Motorsports	Chevrolet
35	Joey Gase	Emerling-Gase Motorsports	Ford
36	Josh Williams	DGM Racing	Chevrolet
38	C. J. McLaughlin	RSS Racing	Ford
39	Ryan Sieg	RSS Racing	Ford
44	Howie DiSavino III	Alpha Prime Racing	Chevrolet
45	Rajah Caruth	Alpha Prime Racing	Chevrolet
47	Brennan Poole (i)	Mike Harmon Racing	Chevrolet
48	Ross Chastain (i)	Big Machine Racing	Chevrolet
51	Jeremy Clements	Jeremy Clements Racing	Chevrolet
54	Ty Gibbs	Joe Gibbs Racing	Toyota
66	J. J. Yeley	MBM Motorsports	Ford
68	Kris Wright (i)	Brandonbilt Motorsports	Chevrolet
77	Dillon Bassett	Bassett Racing	Chevrolet
78	Stefan Parsons (i)	B. J. McLeod Motorsports	Chevrolet
91	Mason Massey	DGM Racing	Chevrolet
98	Riley Herbst	Stewart-Haas Racing	Ford
Official entry list

== Practice ==
The only 30-minute practice session was held on Friday, September 9, at 4:00 PM CST. Ty Gibbs, driving for Joe Gibbs Racing, was the fastest in the session, with a lap of 31.138, and an average speed of 173.422 mph (279.096 km/h).

Pos.	#	Driver	Team	Make	Time	Speed
1	54	Ty Gibbs	Joe Gibbs Racing	Toyota	31.138	173.422
2	9	Noah Gragson	JR Motorsports	Chevrolet	31.346	172.271
3	18	Sammy Smith	Joe Gibbs Racing	Toyota	31.466	171.614
Full practice results

== Qualifying ==
Qualifying was held on Saturday, September 9, at 4:30 PM CST. Since Kansas Speedway is a tri-oval track, the qualifying system used is a single-car, single-lap system with only one round. Whoever sets the fastest time in the round wins the pole. Brandon Jones, driving for Joe Gibbs Racing, scored the pole for the race, with a lap of 30.911, and an average speed of 174.695 mph (281.144 km/h).

=== Full qualifying results ===
Pos.	#	Driver	Team	Make	Time	Speed
1	19	Brandon Jones	Joe Gibbs Racing	Toyota	30.911	174.695
2	54	Ty Gibbs	Joe Gibbs Racing	Toyota	30.942	174.520
3	2	Sheldon Creed (R)	Richard Childress Racing	Chevrolet	31.103	173.617
4	16	A. J. Allmendinger	Kaulig Racing	Chevrolet	31.131	173.461
5	9	Noah Gragson	JR Motorsports	Chevrolet	31.140	173.410
6	21	Austin Hill (R)	Richard Childress Racing	Chevrolet	31.168	173.255
7	11	Daniel Hemric	Kaulig Racing	Chevrolet	31.178	173.199
8	1	Sam Mayer	JR Motorsports	Chevrolet	31.205	173.049
9	7	Justin Allgaier	JR Motorsports	Chevrolet	31.258	172.756
10	8	Josh Berry	JR Motorsports	Chevrolet	31.274	172.667
11	18	Sammy Smith	Joe Gibbs Racing	Toyota	31.335	172.331
12	98	Riley Herbst	Stewart-Haas Racing	Ford	31.394	172.007
13	39	Ryan Sieg	RSS Racing	Ford	31.475	171.565
14	10	Landon Cassill	Kaulig Racing	Chevrolet	31.503	171.412
15	48	Ross Chastain (i)	Big Machine Racing	Chevrolet	31.567	171.065
16	07	Brett Moffitt	SS-Green Light Racing	Ford	31.671	170.503
17	51	Jeremy Clements	Jeremy Clements Racing	Chevrolet	31.707	170.309
18	34	Kyle Weatherman	Jesse Iwuji Motorsports	Chevrolet	31.773	169.956
19	27	Jeb Burton	Our Motorsports	Chevrolet	31.861	169.486
20	02	Brandon Brown	Our Motorsports	Chevrolet	31.898	169.290
21	31	Myatt Snider	Jordan Anderson Racing	Chevrolet	31.900	169.279
22	23	Anthony Alfredo	Our Motorsports	Chevrolet	31.951	169.009
23	4	Bayley Currey	JD Motorsports	Chevrolet	31.952	169.004
24	91	Mason Massey	DGM Racing	Chevrolet	32.098	168.235
25	44	Howie DiSavino III	Alpha Prime Racing	Chevrolet	32.103	168.209
26	77	Dillon Bassett	Bassett Racing	Chevrolet	32.185	167.780
27	45	Rajah Caruth	Alpha Prime Racing	Chevrolet	32.193	167.738
28	66	J. J. Yeley	MBM Motorsports	Ford	32.221	167.593
29	36	Josh Williams	DGM Racing	Chevrolet	32.441	166.456
30	47	Brennan Poole (i)	Mike Harmon Racing	Chevrolet	32.457	166.374
31	08	David Starr	SS-Green Light Racing	Ford	32.514	166.082
32	38	C. J. McLaughlin	RSS Racing	Ford	32.735	164.961
33	5	Garrett Smithley	B. J. McLeod Motorsports	Chevrolet	32.771	164.780
Qualified by owner's points
34	78	Stefan Parsons (i)	B. J. McLeod Motorsports	Chevrolet	32.928	163.994
35	26	Derek Griffith	Sam Hunt Racing	Toyota	33.000	163.636
36	35	Joey Gase	Emerling-Gase Motorsports	Ford	33.359	161.875
37	68	Kris Wright (i)	Brandonbilt Motorsports	Chevrolet	-	-
38	6	Ryan Vargas	JD Motorsports	Chevrolet	-	-
Failed to qualify
39	13	Akinori Ogata (i)	MBM Motorsports	Toyota	32.973	163.770
Official qualifying results
Official starting lineup

== Race results ==
Stage 1 Laps: 45

Pos.	#	Driver	Team	Make	Pts
1	54	Ty Gibbs	Joe Gibbs Racing	Toyota	10
2	9	Noah Gragson	JR Motorsports	Chevrolet	9
3	19	Brandon Jones	Joe Gibbs Racing	Toyota	8
4	18	Sammy Smith	Joe Gibbs Racing	Toyota	7
5	7	Justin Allgaier	JR Motorsports	Chevrolet	6
6	07	Brett Moffitt	SS-Green Light Racing	Ford	5
7	21	Austin Hill (R)	Richard Childress Racing	Chevrolet	4
8	16	A. J. Allmendinger	Kaulig Racing	Chevrolet	3
9	8	Josh Berry	JR Motorsports	Chevrolet	2
10	98	Riley Herbst	Stewart-Haas Racing	Ford	1

Stage 2 Laps: 45

Pos.	#	Driver	Team	Make	Pts
1	9	Noah Gragson	JR Motorsports	Chevrolet	10
2	7	Justin Allgaier	JR Motorsports	Chevrolet	9
3	54	Ty Gibbs	Joe Gibbs Racing	Toyota	8
4	19	Brandon Jones	Joe Gibbs Racing	Toyota	7
5	48	Ross Chastain (i)	Big Machine Racing	Chevrolet	0
6	16	A. J. Allmendinger	Kaulig Racing	Chevrolet	5
7	8	Josh Berry	JR Motorsports	Chevrolet	4
8	18	Sammy Smith	Joe Gibbs Racing	Toyota	3
9	1	Sam Mayer	JR Motorsports	Chevrolet	2
10	07	Brett Moffitt	SS-Green Light Racing	Ford	1

Stage 3 Laps: 3*

Fin.	St	#	Driver	Team	Make	Laps	Led	Status	Pts
1	5	9	Noah Gragson	JR Motorsports	Chevrolet	93	20	Running	59
2	9	7	Justin Allgaier	JR Motorsports	Chevrolet	93	0	Running	50
3	2	54	Ty Gibbs	Joe Gibbs Racing	Toyota	93	66	Running	52
4	1	19	Brandon Jones	Joe Gibbs Racing	Toyota	93	4	Running	48
5	15	48	Ross Chastain (i)	Big Machine Racing	Chevrolet	93	0	Running	0
6	4	16	A. J. Allmendinger	Kaulig Racing	Chevrolet	93	0	Running	39
7	10	8	Josh Berry	JR Motorsports	Chevrolet	93	0	Running	36
8	11	18	Sammy Smith	Joe Gibbs Racing	Toyota	93	0	Running	39
9	8	1	Sam Mayer	JR Motorsports	Chevrolet	93	0	Running	30
10	16	07	Brett Moffitt	SS-Green Light Racing	Ford	93	0	Running	33
11	3	2	Sheldon Creed (R)	Richard Childress Racing	Chevrolet	93	0	Running	26
12	6	21	Austin Hill (R)	Richard Childress Racing	Chevrolet	93	3	Running	29
13	14	10	Landon Cassill	Kaulig Racing	Chevrolet	93	0	Running	24
14	13	39	Ryan Sieg	RSS Racing	Ford	93	0	Running	23
15	7	11	Daniel Hemric	Kaulig Racing	Chevrolet	93	0	Running	22
16	12	98	Riley Herbst	Stewart-Haas Racing	Ford	93	0	Running	22
17	20	02	Brandon Brown	Our Motorsports	Chevrolet	93	0	Running	20
18	22	23	Anthony Alfredo	Our Motorsports	Chevrolet	93	0	Running	19
19	21	31	Myatt Snider	Jordan Anderson Racing	Chevrolet	93	0	Running	18
20	37	68	Kris Wright	Brandonbilt Motorsports	Chevrolet	93	0	Running	17
21	17	51	Jeremy Clements	Jeremy Clements Racing	Chevrolet	92	0	Running	16
22	28	66	J. J. Yeley	MBM Motorsports	Ford	92	0	Running	15
23	31	08	David Starr	SS-Green Light Racing	Ford	92	0	Running	14
24	29	36	Josh Williams	DGM Racing	Chevrolet	92	0	Running	13
25	27	45	Rajah Caruth (i)	Alpha Prime Racing	Chevrolet	92	0	Running	0
26	34	78	Stefan Parsons (i)	B. J. McLeod Motorsports	Chevrolet	92	0	Running	0
27	35	26	Derek Griffith	Sam Hunt Racing	Toyota	92	0	Running	10
28	25	44	Howie DiSavino III	Alpha Prime Racing	Chevrolet	92	0	Running	9
29	26	77	Dillon Bassett	Bassett Racing	Chevrolet	92	0	Running	8
30	36	35	Joey Gase	Emerling-Gase Motorsports	Toyota	92	0	Running	7
31	24	91	Mason Massey	DGM Racing	Chevrolet	91	0	Running	6
32	33	5	Garrett Smithley	B. J. McLeod Motorsports	Chevrolet	91	0	Running	5
33	38	6	Ryan Vargas	JD Motorsports	Chevrolet	91	0	Running	4
34	32	38	C. J. McLaughlin	RSS Racing	Ford	91	0	Running	3
35	23	4	Bayley Currey	JD Motorsports	Chevrolet	90	0	Running	2
36	18	34	Jesse Iwuji	Jesse Iwuji Motorsports	Chevrolet	89	0	Running	2
37	30	47	Brennan Poole (i)	Mike Harmon Racing	Chevrolet	73	0	Transmission	0
38	19	27	Jeb Burton	Our Motorsports	Chevrolet	51	0	Engine	1
Official race results

== Standings after the race ==
Drivers' Championship standings

	Pos	Driver	Points
	1	A. J. Allmendinger	1,003
	2	Ty Gibbs	965 (-38)
	3	Justin Allgaier	948 (-55)
	4	Noah Gragson	931 (-72)
	5	Josh Berry	866 (-137)
	6	Austin Hill	769 (-234)
	7	Brandon Jones	756 (-247)
1	8	Sam Mayer	678 (-325)
1	9	Riley Herbst	673 (-330)
	10	Daniel Hemric	615 (-388)
	11	Landon Cassill	597 (-406)
	12	Ryan Sieg	578 (-425)
Official driver's standings

- Note: Only the first 12 positions are included for the driver standings.

Previous race: 2022 Sport Clips Haircuts VFW 200	NASCAR Xfinity Series; 2022 season	Next race: 2022 Food City 300
