= 2022 Sport Clips Haircuts VFW 200 =

24th race of the 2022 NASCAR Xfinity Series

2022 Sport Clips Haircuts VFW Help a Hero 200
Race details
- Race 24 of 33 of the 2022 NASCAR Xfinity Series
- Date: September 3, 2022
- Official name: 30th Annual Sport Clips Haircuts VFW 200
- Location: Darlington Raceway, Darlington, South Carolina
- Course: Permanent racing facility
- Course length: 1.366 miles (2.198 km)
- Distance: 147 laps, 200.8 mi (323.156 km)
- Scheduled distance: 147 laps, 200.8 mi (323.156 km)
- Average speed: 97.979 mph (157.682 km/h)

Pole position
Driver	Brandon Jones	Joe Gibbs Racing
- Time: 29.722

Most laps led
Driver	Noah Gragson	JR Motorsports
- Laps: 82

Winner
No. 9	Noah Gragson	JR Motorsports

Television in the United States
- Network: USA Network
- Announcers: Dave Burns, Jeff Burton and Steve Letarte,

Radio in the United States
- Radio: Motor Racing Network

The 2022 Sport Clips Haircuts VFW Help a Hero 200 was the 24th stock car race of the 2022 NASCAR Xfinity Series, and the 30th iteration of the event. The race was held on Saturday, September 3, 2022, in Darlington, South Carolina at Darlington Raceway, a 1.366 miles (2.198 km) permanent tri-oval shaped racetrack. The race took the scheduled 147 laps to complete. In an exciting battle for the finish, Noah Gragson, driving for JR Motorsports, took advantage of the lead on the last lap, and earned his ninth career NASCAR Xfinity Series win, along with his fourth of the season. To fill out the podium, Sheldon Creed, driving for Richard Childress Racing, and A. J. Allmendinger, driving for Kaulig Racing, finished 2nd and 3rd, respectively.

On the final lap of the race, Sheldon Creed and Kyle Larson were side by side, battling for the win. Creed and Larson made big contact coming through turns one and two. Noah Gragson went to the inside lane through the straightaway, causing it to be three wide. Creed would eventually get loose, causing him to hit the outside wall. He continued to ride the wall through turns three and four, trying to stay in front of the leader, Gragson. It would be unsuccessful, and Gragson was able to steal the win. Creed ultimately finished 2nd, and Larson fell back to finish 5th. Gragson dominated the race in general, leading 82 laps.

== Background ==
Darlington Raceway is a race track built for NASCAR racing located in Darlington, South Carolina. It is nicknamed "The Lady in Black" and "The Track Too Tough to Tame" by many NASCAR fans and drivers and advertised as "A NASCAR Tradition." It is of a unique, somewhat egg-shaped design, an oval with the ends of very different configurations, a condition which supposedly arose from the proximity of one end of the track to a minnow pond the owner refused to relocate. This situation makes it very challenging for the crews to set up their cars' handling in a way that will be effective at both ends.

=== Entry list ===
- (R) denotes rookie driver.
- (i) denotes driver who are ineligible for series driver points.

#	Driver	Team	Make
1	Sam Mayer	JR Motorsports	Chevrolet
02	Ty Dillon (i)	Our Motorsports	Chevrolet
2	Sheldon Creed (R)	Richard Childress Racing	Chevrolet
4	Bayley Currey	JD Motorsports	Chevrolet
5	Tommy Joe Martins	B. J. McLeod Motorsports	Chevrolet
6	Ryan Vargas	JD Motorsports	Chevrolet
07	Joe Graf Jr.	SS-Green Light Racing	Ford
7	Justin Allgaier	JR Motorsports	Chevrolet
08	David Starr	SS-Green Light Racing	Ford
8	Josh Berry	JR Motorsports	Chevrolet
9	Noah Gragson	JR Motorsports	Chevrolet
10	Landon Cassill	Kaulig Racing	Chevrolet
11	Daniel Hemric	Kaulig Racing	Chevrolet
13	Chad Finchum	MBM Motorsports	Ford
16	A. J. Allmendinger	Kaulig Racing	Chevrolet
17	Kyle Larson (i)	Hendrick Motorsports	Chevrolet
18	Christopher Bell (i)	Joe Gibbs Racing	Toyota
19	Brandon Jones	Joe Gibbs Racing	Toyota
21	Austin Hill (R)	Richard Childress Racing	Chevrolet
23	Anthony Alfredo	Our Motorsports	Chevrolet
26	John Hunter Nemechek (i)	Sam Hunt Racing	Toyota
27	Jeb Burton	Our Motorsports	Chevrolet
31	Myatt Snider	Jordan Anderson Racing	Chevrolet
34	Kyle Weatherman	Jesse Iwuji Motorsports	Chevrolet
35	Dawson Cram	Emerling-Gase Motorsports	Toyota
36	Josh Williams	DGM Racing	Chevrolet
38	Kyle Sieg (R)	RSS Racing	Ford
39	Ryan Sieg	RSS Racing	Ford
44	Ryan Ellis	Alpha Prime Racing	Chevrolet
45	Stefan Parsons (i)	Alpha Prime Racing	Chevrolet
47	Brennan Poole (i)	Mike Harmon Racing	Chevrolet
48	Ross Chastain (i)	Big Machine Racing	Chevrolet
51	Jeremy Clements	Jeremy Clements Racing	Chevrolet
54	Ty Gibbs	Joe Gibbs Racing	Toyota
66	J. J. Yeley	MBM Motorsports	Chevrolet
68	Kris Wright	Brandonbilt Motorsports	Chevrolet
78	Brandon Brown	B. J. McLeod Motorsports	Chevrolet
91	Mason Massey	DGM Racing	Chevrolet
98	Riley Herbst	Stewart-Haas Racing	Ford
Official entry list

== Practice ==
The only 30-minute practice session was held on Saturday, September 3, at 10:00 AM EST. Justin Allgaier, driving for JR Motorsports, was the fastest in the session, with a lap of 29.632, and an average speed of 165.956 mph (267.080 km/h).

Pos.	#	Driver	Team	Make	Time	Speed
1	7	Justin Allgaier	JR Motorsports	Chevrolet	29.632	165.956
2	9	Noah Gragson	JR Motorsports	Chevrolet	29.770	165.186
3	2	Sheldon Creed (R)	Richard Childress Racing	Chevrolet	29.785	165.103
Full practice results

== Qualifying ==
Qualifying was held on Saturday, September 3, at 10:30 AM EST. Since Darlington Raceway is a tri-oval track, the qualifying system used is a single-car, single-lap system with only one round. Whoever sets the fastest time in the round wins the pole. Brandon Jones, driving for Joe Gibbs Racing, scored the pole for the race, with a lap of 29.722, and an average speed of 165.453 mph (266.271 km/h).

Pos.	#	Driver	Team	Make	Time	Speed
1	19	Brandon Jones	Joe Gibbs Racing	Toyota	29.722	165.453
2	9	Noah Gragson	JR Motorsports	Chevrolet	29.762	165.231
3	2	Sheldon Creed (R)	Richard Childress Racing	Chevrolet	29.916	164.380
4	21	Austin Hill (R)	Richard Childress Racing	Chevrolet	29.942	164.238
5	54	Ty Gibbs	Joe Gibbs Racing	Toyota	29.965	164.111
6	7	Justin Allgaier	JR Motorsports	Chevrolet	29.987	163.991
7	17	Kyle Larson (i)	Hendrick Motorsports	Chevrolet	29.988	163.986
8	98	Riley Herbst	Stewart-Haas Racing	Ford	29.996	163.942
9	10	Landon Cassill	Kaulig Racing	Chevrolet	30.021	163.805
10	11	Daniel Hemric	Kaulig Racing	Chevrolet	30.061	163.587
11	48	Ross Chastain (i)	Big Machine Racing	Chevrolet	30.074	163.517
12	1	Sam Mayer	JR Motorsports	Chevrolet	30.107	163.337
13	51	Jeremy Clements	Jeremy Clements Racing	Chevrolet	30.132	163.202
14	45	Stefan Parsons (i)	Alpha Prime Racing	Chevrolet	30.137	163.175
15	8	Josh Berry	JR Motorsports	Chevrolet	30.184	162.921
16	34	Kyle Weatherman	Jesse Iwuji Motorsports	Chevrolet	30.227	162.689
17	26	John Hunter Nemechek (i)	Sam Hunt Racing	Toyota	30.249	162.571
18	27	Jeb Burton	Our Motorsports	Chevrolet	30.283	162.388
19	16	A. J. Allmendinger	Kaulig Racing	Chevrolet	30.304	162.276
20	07	Joe Graf Jr.	SS-Green Light Racing	Ford	30.352	162.019
21	31	Myatt Snider	Jordan Anderson Racing	Chevrolet	30.404	161.742
22	4	Bayley Currey	JD Motorsports	Chevrolet	30.431	161.598
23	66	J. J. Yeley	MBM Motorsports	Toyota	30.439	161.556
24	02	Ty Dillon (i)	Our Motorsports	Chevrolet	30.445	161.524
25	39	Ryan Sieg	RSS Racing	Ford	30.460	161.445
26	6	Ryan Vargas	JD Motorsports	Chevrolet	30.566	160.885
27	91	Mason Massey	DGM Racing	Chevrolet	30.621	160.596
28	47	Brennan Poole (i)	Mike Harmon Racing	Chevrolet	30.820	159.559
29	36	Alex Labbé	DGM Racing	Chevrolet	30.853	159.388
30	08	David Starr	SS-Green Light Racing	Ford	30.937	158.955
31	44	Ryan Ellis	Alpha Prime Racing	Chevrolet	30.958	158.847
32	78	Brandon Brown	B. J. McLeod Motorsports	Chevrolet	30.979	158.740
33	5	Tommy Joe Martins	B. J. McLeod Motorsports	Chevrolet	31.091	158.168
Qualified by owner's points
34	68	Kris Wright	Brandonbilt Motorsports	Chevrolet	31.298	157.122
35	35	Dawson Cram	Emerling-Gase Motorsports	Ford	31.576	155.739
36	18	Christopher Bell (i)	Joe Gibbs Racing	Toyota	-	-
37	23	Anthony Alfredo	Our Motorsports	Chevrolet	-	-
38	38	Kyle Sieg	RSS Racing	Ford	-	-
Failed to qualify
39	13	Chad Finchum	MBM Motorsports	Toyota	-	-
Official qualifying results
Official starting lineup

== Race results ==
Stage 1 Laps: 45

Pos.	#	Driver	Team	Make	Pts
1	9	Noah Gragson	JR Motorsports	Chevrolet	10
2	19	Brandon Jones	Joe Gibbs Racing	Toyota	9
3	54	Ty Gibbs	Joe Gibbs Racing	Toyota	8
4	7	Justin Allgaier	JR Motorsports	Chevrolet	7
5	2	Sheldon Creed (R)	Richard Childress Racing	Chevrolet	6
6	98	Riley Herbst	Stewart-Haas Racing	Ford	5
7	21	Austin Hill (R)	Richard Childress Racing	Chevrolet	4
8	18	Christopher Bell (i)	Joe Gibbs Racing	Toyota	0
9	34	Kyle Weatherman	Jesse Iwuji Motorsports	Chevrolet	2
10	48	Ross Chastain (i)	Big Machine Racing	Chevrolet	0

Stage 2 Laps: 45

Pos.	#	Driver	Team	Make	Pts
1	7	Justin Allgaier	JR Motorsports	Chevrolet	10
2	9	Noah Gragson	JR Motorsports	Chevrolet	9
3	18	Christopher Bell (i)	Joe Gibbs Racing	Toyota	0
4	19	Brandon Jones	Joe Gibbs Racing	Toyota	7
5	21	Austin Hill (R)	Richard Childress Racing	Chevrolet	6
6	2	Sheldon Creed (R)	Richard Childress Racing	Chevrolet	5
7	54	Ty Gibbs	Joe Gibbs Racing	Toyota	4
8	26	John Hunter Nemechek (i)	Sam Hunt Racing	Toyota	0
9	16	A. J. Allmendinger	Kaulig Racing	Chevrolet	2
10	8	Josh Berry	JR Motorsports	Chevrolet	1

Stage 3 Laps: 57

Fin.	St	#	Driver	Team	Make	Laps	Led	Status	Pts
1	2	9	Noah Gragson	JR Motorsports	Chevrolet	147	82	Running	59
2	3	2	Sheldon Creed (R)	Richard Childress Racing	Chevrolet	147	47	Running	46
3	19	16	A. J. Allmendinger	Kaulig Racing	Chevrolet	147	0	Running	36
4	6	7	Justin Allgaier	JR Motorsports	Chevrolet	147	12	Running	50
5	7	17	Kyle Larson (i)	Hendrick Motorsports	Chevrolet	147	1	Running	0
6	5	54	Ty Gibbs	Joe Gibbs Racing	Toyota	147	0	Running	43
7	36	18	Christopher Bell (i)	Joe Gibbs Racing	Toyota	147	0	Running	0
8	15	8	Josh Berry	JR Motorsports	Chevrolet	147	0	Running	30
9	17	26	John Hunter Nemechek (i)	Sam Hunt Racing	Toyota	147	0	Running	0
10	4	21	Austin Hill (R)	Richard Childress Racing	Chevrolet	147	2	Running	37
11	12	1	Sam Mayer	JR Motorsports	Chevrolet	147	0	Running	26
12	9	10	Landon Cassill	Kaulig Racing	Chevrolet	147	0	Running	25
13	10	11	Daniel Hemric	Kaulig Racing	Chevrolet	147	0	Running	24
14	1	19	Brandon Jones	Joe Gibbs Racing	Toyota	147	3	Running	39
15	11	48	Ross Chastain (i)	Big Machine Racing	Chevrolet	147	0	Running	0
16	16	34	Kyle Weatherman	Jesse Iwuji Motorsports	Chevrolet	147	0	Running	23
17	14	45	Stefan Parsons (i)	Alpha Prime Racing	Chevrolet	147	0	Running	0
18	25	39	Ryan Sieg	RSS Racing	Ford	147	0	Running	19
19	22	4	Bayley Currey	JD Motorsports	Chevrolet	147	0	Running	18
20	27	91	Mason Massey	DGM Racing	Chevrolet	147	0	Running	17
21	13	51	Jeremy Clements	Jeremy Clements Racing	Chevrolet	147	0	Running	16
22	31	44	Ryan Ellis	Alpha Prime Racing	Chevrolet	147	0	Running	15
23	38	38	Kyle Sieg	RSS Racing	Ford	147	0	Running	14
24	18	27	Jeb Burton	Our Motorsports	Chevrolet	147	0	Running	13
25	30	08	David Starr	SS-Green Light Racing	Ford	147	0	Running	12
26	29	36	Alex Labbé	DGM Racing	Chevrolet	146	0	Running	11
27	26	6	Ryan Vargas	JD Motorsports	Chevrolet	146	0	Running	10
28	21	31	Myatt Snider	Jordan Anderson Racing	Chevrolet	145	0	Running	9
29	32	78	Brandon Brown	B. J. McLeod Motorsports	Chevrolet	145	0	Running	8
30	35	35	Dawson Cram	Emerling-Gase Motorsports	Ford	145	0	Running	7
31	28	47	Brennan Poole (i)	Mike Harmon Racing	Chevrolet	86	0	Axle	0
32	23	66	J. J. Yeley	MBM Motorsports	Toyota	83	0	Engine	5
33	20	07	Joe Graf Jr.	SS-Green Light Racing	Ford	61	0	Accident	4
34	8	98	Riley Herbst	Stewart-Haas Racing	Ford	56	0	DVP	3
35	24	02	Ty Dillon (i)	Our Motorsports	Chevrolet	55	0	Electrical	0
36	34	68	Kris Wright	Brandonbilt Motorsports	Chevrolet	55	0	Accident	1
37	37	23	Anthony Alfredo	Our Motorsports	Chevrolet	51	0	Accident	1
38	33	5	Tommy Joe Martins	B. J. McLeod Motorsports	Chevrolet	44	0	Radiator	1
Official race results

== Standings after the race ==
Drivers' Championship standings

Pos	Driver	Points
1	A. J. Allmendinger	964
2	Ty Gibbs	913 (-51)
3	Justin Allgaier	898 (-66)
4	Noah Gragson	872 (-92)
5	Josh Berry	830 (-134)
6	Austin Hill	740 (-224)
7	Brandon Jones	708 (-256)
8	Riley Herbst	651 (-313)
9	Sam Mayer	648 (-316)
10	Daniel Hemric	593 (-371)
11	Landon Cassill	573 (-391)
12	Ryan Sieg	555 (-409)
Official driver's standings

- Note: Only the first 12 positions are included for the driver standings.

Previous race: 2022 Wawa 250	NASCAR Xfinity Series; 2022 season	Next race: 2022 Kansas Lottery 300
