= 2022 Dead On Tools 250 =

32nd race of the 2022 NASCAR Xfinity Series

Race details
- Race 32 of 33 of the 2022 NASCAR Xfinity Series
- Date: October 29, 2022
- Official name: 16th Annual Dead On Tools 250
- Location: Martinsville Speedway, Ridgeway, Virginia
- Course: Permanent racing facility
- Course length: 0.526 miles (0.847 km)
- Distance: 269 laps, 141.4 mi (227 km)
- Scheduled distance: 250 laps, 157.8 mi (254 km)
- Average speed: 60.410 mph (97.220 km/h)

Pole position
Driver	Brandon Jones	Joe Gibbs Racing
- Time: 19.832

Most laps led
Driver	Ty Gibbs	Joe Gibbs Racing
- Laps: 102

Winner
No. 54	Ty Gibbs	Joe Gibbs Racing

Television in the United States
- Network: NBC
- Announcers: Rick Allen, Jeff Burton, Dale Earnhardt Jr. and Steve Letarte

Radio in the United States
- Radio: Motor Racing Network

The 2022 Dead On Tools 250 was the 32nd stock car race of the 2022 NASCAR Xfinity Series, the final race of the Round of 8, and the 16th iteration of the event. The race was held on Saturday, October 29, 2022, in Ridgeway, Virginia at Martinsville Speedway, a 0.526 miles (0.847 km) permanent paperclip-shaped short track. The race was increased from 250 laps to 269 laps, due to numerous NASCAR overtime finishes. In a chaotic race that brought several cautions, Ty Gibbs, driving for Joe Gibbs Racing, would win the race in controversy, after he would bump into his teammate, Brandon Jones, on the final lap, causing him to spin in turn two. Gibbs would dominate for parts of the race as well, leading 102 laps. This was Gibbs' 10th career NASCAR Xfinity Series win, and his sixth of the season. Gibbs would also earn a spot in the championship four, despite already advancing on points. To fill out the podium, Sheldon Creed, driving for Richard Childress Racing, and Riley Herbst, driving for Stewart-Haas Racing, would finish 2nd and 3rd respectively.

Meanwhile, the drivers that will advance into championship four are Justin Allgaier, Josh Berry, Noah Gragson, and Ty Gibbs. A. J. Allmendinger, Austin Hill, Sam Mayer, and Brandon Jones would be eliminated from the playoffs.

== Background ==
Martinsville Speedway is a NASCAR-owned stock car racing short track in Ridgeway, Virginia, just south of Martinsville. At 0.526 miles (847 m) in length, it is the shortest track in the NASCAR Cup Series. The track was also one of the first paved oval tracks in stock car racing, being built in 1947 by partners H. Clay Earles, Henry Lawrence, and Sam Rice, nearly a year before NASCAR was officially formed. It is also the only race track that has been on the NASCAR circuit from its beginning in 1948. Along with this, Martinsville is the only oval track on the NASCAR circuit to have asphalt surfaces on the straightaways and concrete to cover the turns.

=== Entry list ===
- (R) denotes rookie driver.
- (i) denotes driver who are ineligible for series driver points.

#	Driver	Team	Make
1	Sam Mayer	JR Motorsports	Chevrolet
02	Blaine Perkins (i)	Our Motorsports	Chevrolet
2	Sheldon Creed (R)	Richard Childress Racing	Chevrolet
4	Bayley Currey	JD Motorsports	Chevrolet
5	Matt Mills (i)	B. J. McLeod Motorsports	Chevrolet
6	Ryan Vargas	JD Motorsports	Chevrolet
07	Joe Graf Jr.	SS-Green Light Racing	Ford
7	Justin Allgaier	JR Motorsports	Chevrolet
08	Brandon Brown	SS-Green Light Racing	Ford
8	Josh Berry	JR Motorsports	Chevrolet
9	Noah Gragson	JR Motorsports	Chevrolet
10	Landon Cassill	Kaulig Racing	Chevrolet
11	Daniel Hemric	Kaulig Racing	Chevrolet
13	Chad Finchum	MBM Motorsports	Toyota
16	A. J. Allmendinger	Kaulig Racing	Chevrolet
18	Sammy Smith	Joe Gibbs Racing	Toyota
19	Brandon Jones	Joe Gibbs Racing	Toyota
21	Austin Hill (R)	Richard Childress Racing	Chevrolet
23	Anthony Alfredo	Our Motorsports	Chevrolet
26	Derek Griffith	Sam Hunt Racing	Toyota
27	Jeb Burton	Our Motorsports	Chevrolet
31	Myatt Snider	Jordan Anderson Racing	Chevrolet
34	Kyle Weatherman	Jesse Iwuji Motorsports	Chevrolet
35	Patrick Emerling	Emerling-Gase Motorsports	Chevrolet
36	Alex Labbé	DGM Racing	Chevrolet
38	C. J. McLaughlin	RSS Racing	Ford
39	Ryan Sieg	RSS Racing	Ford
44	Rajah Caruth (i)	Alpha Prime Racing	Chevrolet
45	Howie Disavino III	Alpha Prime Racing	Chevrolet
47	Dawson Cram	Mike Harmon Racing	Chevrolet
48	Nick Sanchez	Big Machine Racing	Chevrolet
51	Jeremy Clements	Jeremy Clements Racing	Chevrolet
54	Ty Gibbs	Joe Gibbs Racing	Toyota
66	J. J. Yeley	MBM Motorsports	Toyota
68	Kris Wright	Brandonbilt Motorsports	Chevrolet
77	Ronnie Bassett Jr.	Bassett Racing	Chevrolet
78	Stefan Parsons (i)	B. J. McLeod Motorsports	Chevrolet
91	Mason Massey	DGM Racing	Chevrolet
92	Josh Williams	DGM Racing	Chevrolet
98	Riley Herbst	Stewart-Haas Racing	Ford
Official entry list

== Practice ==
For practice, drivers will be separated into two groups, Group A and B. Both sessions will be 15 minutes long, and was held on Friday, October 28, at 4:00 PM EST. Ty Gibbs, driving for Joe Gibbs Racing, would set the fastest time out of all drivers, with a lap of 20.348, and an average speed of 93.061 mph (149.767 km/h).

Pos.	#	Driver	Team	Make	Time	Speed
1	54	Ty Gibbs	Joe Gibbs Racing	Toyota	20.348	93.061
2	2	Sheldon Creed (R)	Richard Childress Racing	Chevrolet	20.355	93.029
3	16	A. J. Allmendinger	Kaulig Racing	Chevrolet	20.375	92.937
Full practice results

== Qualifying ==
Qualifying was held on Friday, October 28, at 4:35 PM EST. Since Martinsville Speedway is a short track, the qualifying system used is a single-car, two-lap system with only one round. Whoever sets the fastest time in the round wins the pole. Brandon Jones, driving for Joe Gibbs Racing, would score the pole for the race, with a lap of 19.832, and an average speed of 95.482 mph (153.663 km/h).

Pos.	#	Driver	Team	Make	Time	Speed
1	19	Brandon Jones	Joe Gibbs Racing	Toyota	19.832	95.482
2	2	Sheldon Creed (R)	Richard Childress Racing	Chevrolet	19.863	95.333
3	18	Sammy Smith	Joe Gibbs Racing	Toyota	19.867	95.314
4	54	Ty Gibbs	Joe Gibbs Racing	Toyota	19.898	95.165
5	9	Noah Gragson	JR Motorsports	Chevrolet	19.916	95.079
6	7	Justin Allgaier	JR Motorsports	Chevrolet	20.042	94.482
7	23	Anthony Alfredo	Our Motorsports	Chevrolet	20.092	94.246
8	98	Riley Herbst	Stewart-Haas Racing	Ford	20.099	94.214
9	16	A. J. Allmendinger	Kaulig Racing	Chevrolet	20.102	94.200
10	51	Jeremy Clements	Jeremy Clements Racing	Chevrolet	20.109	94.167
11	27	Jeb Burton	Our Motorsports	Chevrolet	20.121	94.111
12	07	Joe Graf Jr.	SS-Green Light Racing	Ford	20.161	93.924
13	8	Josh Berry	JR Motorsports	Chevrolet	20.179	93.840
14	31	Myatt Snider	Jordan Anderson Racing	Chevrolet	20.196	93.761
15	26	Derek Griffith	Sam Hunt Racing	Toyota	20.207	93.710
16	10	Landon Cassill	Kaulig Racing	Chevrolet	20.208	93.705
17	39	Ryan Sieg	RSS Racing	Ford	20.258	93.474
18	44	Rajah Caruth (i)	Alpha Prime Racing	Chevrolet	20.258	93.474
19	45	Howie DiSavino III	Alpha Prime Racing	Chevrolet	20.260	93.465
20	4	Bayley Currey	JD Motorsports	Chevrolet	20.266	93.437
21	36	Alex Labbé	DGM Racing	Chevrolet	20.267	93.433
22	1	Sam Mayer	JR Motorsports	Chevrolet	20.271	93.414
23	02	Blaine Perkins (i)	Our Motorsports	Chevrolet	20.285	93.350
24	48	Nick Sanchez	Big Machine Racing	Chevrolet	20.318	93.198
25	78	Stefan Parsons (i)	B. J. McLeod Motorsports	Chevrolet	20.347	93.065
26	5	Matt Mills (i)	B. J. McLeod Motorsports	Chevrolet	20.372	92.951
27	08	Brandon Brown	SS-Green Light Racing	Ford	20.426	92.705
28	66	J. J. Yeley	MBM Motorsports	Toyota	20.455	92.574
29	6	Ryan Vargas	JD Motorsports	Chevrolet	20.509	92.330
30	35	Patrick Emerling	Emerling-Gase Motorsports	Chevrolet	20.532	92.227
31	68	Kris Wright	Brandonbilt Motorsports	Chevrolet	20.551	92.142
32	91	Mason Massey	DGM Racing	Chevrolet	20.552	92.137
33	92	Josh Williams	DGM Racing	Chevrolet	20.558	92.110
Qualified by owner's points
34	38	C. J. McLaughlin	RSS Racing	Ford	20.642	91.735
35	13	Chad Finchum	MBM Motorsports	Toyota	20.706	91.452
36	21	Austin Hill (R)	Richard Childress Racing	Chevrolet	-	-
37	11	Daniel Hemric	Kaulig Racing	Chevrolet	-	-
38	34	Kyle Weatherman	Jesse Iwuji Motorsports	Chevrolet	-	-
Failed to qualify
39	47	Dawson Cram	Mike Harmon Racing	Chevrolet	20.923	90.503
40	77	Ronnie Bassett Jr.	Bassett Racing	Chevrolet	20.942	90.421
Official qualifying results
Official starting lineup

== Race results ==
Stage 1 Laps: 60

Pos.	#	Driver	Team	Make	Pts
1	19	Brandon Jones	Joe Gibbs Racing	Toyota	10
2	54	Ty Gibbs	Joe Gibbs Racing	Toyota	9
3	7	Justin Allgaier	JR Motorsports	Chevrolet	8
4	8	Josh Berry	JR Motorsports	Chevrolet	7
5	18	Sammy Smith	Joe Gibbs Racing	Toyota	6
6	98	Riley Herbst	Stewart-Haas Racing	Ford	5
7	2	Sheldon Creed (R)	Richard Childress Racing	Chevrolet	4
8	16	A. J. Allmendinger	Kaulig Racing	Chevrolet	3
9	1	Sam Mayer	JR Motorsports	Chevrolet	2
10	21	Austin Hill (R)	Richard Childress Racing	Chevrolet	1

Stage 2 Laps: 60

Pos.	#	Driver	Team	Make	Pts
1	54	Ty Gibbs	Joe Gibbs Racing	Toyota	10
2	7	Justin Allgaier	JR Motorsports	Chevrolet	9
3	16	A. J. Allmendinger	Kaulig Racing	Chevrolet	8
4	9	Noah Gragson	JR Motorsports	Chevrolet	7
5	48	Nick Sanchez	Big Machine Racing	Chevrolet	6
6	8	Josh Berry	JR Motorsports	Chevrolet	5
7	21	Austin Hill (R)	Richard Childress Racing	Chevrolet	4
8	27	Jeb Burton	Our Motorsports	Chevrolet	3
9	39	Ryan Sieg	RSS Racing	Ford	2
10	23	Anthony Alfredo	Our Motorsports	Chevrolet	1

Stage 3 Laps: 149*

Fin.	St	#	Driver	Team	Make	Laps	Led	Status	Pts
1	4	54	Ty Gibbs	Joe Gibbs Racing	Toyota	269	102	Running	59
2	2	2	Sheldon Creed (R)	Richard Childress Racing	Chevrolet	269	0	Running	39
3	8	98	Riley Herbst	Stewart-Haas Racing	Ford	269	0	Running	39
4	5	9	Noah Gragson	JR Motorsports	Chevrolet	269	23	Running	40
5	6	7	Justin Allgaier	JR Motorsports	Chevrolet	269	5	Running	49
6	22	1	Sam Mayer	JR Motorsports	Chevrolet	269	0	Running	33
7	24	48	Nick Sanchez	Big Machine Racing	Chevrolet	269	0	Running	36
8	37	11	Daniel Hemric	Kaulig Racing	Chevrolet	269	0	Running	29
9	36	21	Austin Hill (R)	Richard Childress Racing	Chevrolet	269	0	Running	33
10	23	02	Blaine Perkins (i)	Our Motorsports	Chevrolet	269	0	Running	0
11	11	27	Jeb Burton	Our Motorsports	Chevrolet	269	0	Running	29
12	18	44	Rajah Caruth (i)	Alpha Prime Racing	Chevrolet	269	0	Running	0
13	21	36	Alex Labbé	DGM Racing	Chevrolet	269	0	Running	24
14	14	31	Myatt Snider	Jordan Anderson Racing	Chevrolet	269	0	Running	23
15	15	26	Derek Griffith	Sam Hunt Racing	Toyota	269	0	Running	22
16	9	16	A. J. Allmendinger	Kaulig Racing	Chevrolet	269	0	Running	32
17	10	51	Jeremy Clements	Jeremy Clements Racing	Chevrolet	269	0	Running	20
18	3	18	Sammy Smith	Joe Gibbs Racing	Toyota	269	1	Running	25
19	27	08	Brandon Brown	SS-Green Light Racing	Ford	269	0	Running	18
20	13	8	Josh Berry	JR Motorsports	Chevrolet	269	40	Running	29
21	7	23	Anthony Alfredo	Our Motorsports	Chevrolet	269	0	Running	17
22	33	92	Josh Williams	DGM Racing	Chevrolet	269	0	Running	15
23	1	19	Brandon Jones	Joe Gibbs Racing	Toyota	269	98	Running	24
24	34	38	C. J. McLaughlin	RSS Racing	Ford	268	0	Running	13
25	32	91	Mason Massey	DGM Racing	Chevrolet	265	0	Running	12
26	31	68	Kris Wright	Brandonbilt Motorsports	Chevrolet	261	0	Running	11
27	12	07	Joe Graf Jr.	SS-Green Light Racing	Ford	260	0	Running	10
28	19	45	Howie DiSavino III	Alpha Prime Racing	Chevrolet	259	0	Running	9
29	29	6	Ryan Vargas	JD Motorsports	Chevrolet	248	0	Running	8
30	38	34	Kyle Weatherman	Jesse Iwuji Motorsports	Chevrolet	242	0	Accident	7
31	25	78	Stefan Parsons (i)	B. J. McLeod Motorsports	Chevrolet	219	0	Accident	0
32	30	35	Patrick Emerling	Emerling-Gase Motorsports	Chevrolet	215	0	Accident	5
33	17	39	Ryan Sieg	RSS Racing	Ford	206	0	Accident	4
34	28	66	J. J. Yeley	MBM Motorsports	Toyota	176	0	Brakes	3
35	26	5	Matt Mills (i)	B. J. McLeod Motorsports	Chevrolet	145	0	Engine	0
36	35	13	Chad Finchum	MBM Motorsports	Toyota	137	0	Brakes	1
37	16	10	Landon Cassill	Kaulig Racing	Chevrolet	108	0	Accident	1
38	20	4	Bayley Currey	JD Motorsports	Chevrolet	55	0	Accident	1
Official race results

== Standings after the race ==
Drivers' Championship standings

	Pos	Driver	Points
	1	Noah Gragson	4,000
	2	Ty Gibbs	4,000 (-0)
3	3	Josh Berry	4,000 (-0)
	4	Justin Allgaier	4,000 (-0)
2	5	A. J. Allmendinger	2,297 (-1,703)
1	6	Austin Hill	2,245 (-1,755)
	7	Sam Mayer	2,231 (-1,769)
1	8	Daniel Hemric	2,191 (-1,809)
1	9	Brandon Jones	2,189 (-1,811)
	10	Riley Herbst	2,167 (-1,833)
	11	Ryan Sieg	2,109 (-1,891)
	12	Jeremy Clements	2,059 (-1,941)
Official driver's standings

- Note: Only the first 12 positions are included for the driver standings.

Previous race: 2022 Contender Boats 300	NASCAR Xfinity Series; 2022 season	Next race: 2022 NASCAR Xfinity Series Championship Race
