= Our Motorsports =

Former NASCAR team

- Owners: Chris Our; Mary Our; Arlis “Vic” Reynolds; Jack Perone Fulton
- Base: Welcome, North Carolina
- Series: NASCAR Xfinity Series
- Race drivers: Xfinity Series: 5. Kris Wright, Kaz Grala
- Manufacturer: Chevrolet
- Opened: 2015
- Closed: 2025

Career
- Debut: NASCAR Xfinity Series: 2020 NASCAR Racing Experience 300 (Daytona); ARCA Menards Series: 2015 Lucas Oil 200 (Daytona)
- Latest race: NASCAR Xfinity Series: 2025 BetRivers 200 (Dover); ARCA Menards Series: 2020 Lucas Oil 200 (Daytona)
- Races competed: Total: 197; NASCAR Xfinity Series: 181; ARCA Menards Series: 16
- Drivers' Championships: 0
- Race victories: 0
- Pole positions: 1

Our Motorsports was an American professional stock car racing team that last competed in the NASCAR Xfinity Series, most recently fielding the No. 5 Chevrolet Camaro SS full-time for Kris Wright and Kaz Grala, prior to shutting down for the rest of the 2025 NASCAR Xfinity Series season, ceasing operations entirely. The team also previously competed part-time in the ARCA Menards Series and the NASCAR Whelen Modified Tour. The team was also one of the youngest owned teams in NASCAR being co-owned by 19-year-old Mary Our who became the youngest ever NASCAR car owner.

On July 18, 2025, the team announced that they would cease operations following the race at Dover.

== History ==
The team fielded the No. 22 full-time for Tommy Barrett Jr. in the NASCAR Whelen Modified Tour in 2014. The following year, they attempted to make their debut in the ARCA Racing Series at Daytona with Barrett Jr. driving the No. 7 car, but he did not end up qualifying for the race. It was the only ARCA race the team attempted that year.

In 2016, they returned to ARCA at Talladega with the No. 02 Chevrolet driven by defending NASCAR Whelen Southern Modified Tour champion Andy Seuss. The team had a great qualifying run, starting 10th, but encountered a failure in the brake system and finished 31st. They did not run any other races until Daytona in 2017, where Seuss returned to drive the No. 02 and finished 20th. They returned to Talladega a few months later and impressively, Seuss came from a 33rd-place starting position to finish 2nd in the race. They then attempted the race at Chicagoland in September, the team's first-ever non-restrictor plate start in ARCA.

For 2018, Seuss and Our attempted Daytona and Talladega again along with the new ARCA race at Charlotte. The team fielded a second car for the first time at Talladega that year, which was the No. 6 for Josh Williams.

The team fielded two cars again at Daytona in 2019, with Seuss back in the No. 02 and C. J. McLaughlin in the No. 09. McLaughlin landed the ride after driving for the team at ARCA's Daytona testing in January. Both drivers would run a few races each in their respective cars throughout the season, with Seuss and the No. 02 team racing at Talladega and Charlotte like they did in 2018, and McLaughlin and the No. 09 team running those same three races along with Pocono and Michigan in June.

On October 30, 2019, Our Motorsports announced at the NASCAR Hall of Fame that they would be fielding a full-time team in the NASCAR Xfinity Series, the No. 02 Chevrolet, with Seuss sharing the ride with multiple other drivers that were not announced at that time. Brett Moffitt joined the team for originally a four-race schedule on January 30, 2020. The team purchased cars and equipment from GMS Racing, which closed down their Xfinity team after the 2019 season. The team would also continue to compete in ARCA part-time in 2020, though they only did the race at Daytona with Seuss in the No. 02 and Benny Chastain in the No. 09. and Our Motorsports ARCA team would cease operations after Daytona.

On March 3, 2022, it was announced that Good Money Motorsports, led by Arlis “Vic” Reynolds, who owns Larry's Hard Lemonade Brewing Co., and Jack Perone Fulton, who is the Founder and CEO of International Championship Boxing LLC, had invested in the company, giving them partial ownership. Larry's Hard Lemonade Brewing Co. will also sponsor the team in select races.

In 2023, the team went part-time in the Xfinity Series, fielding for three different drivers.

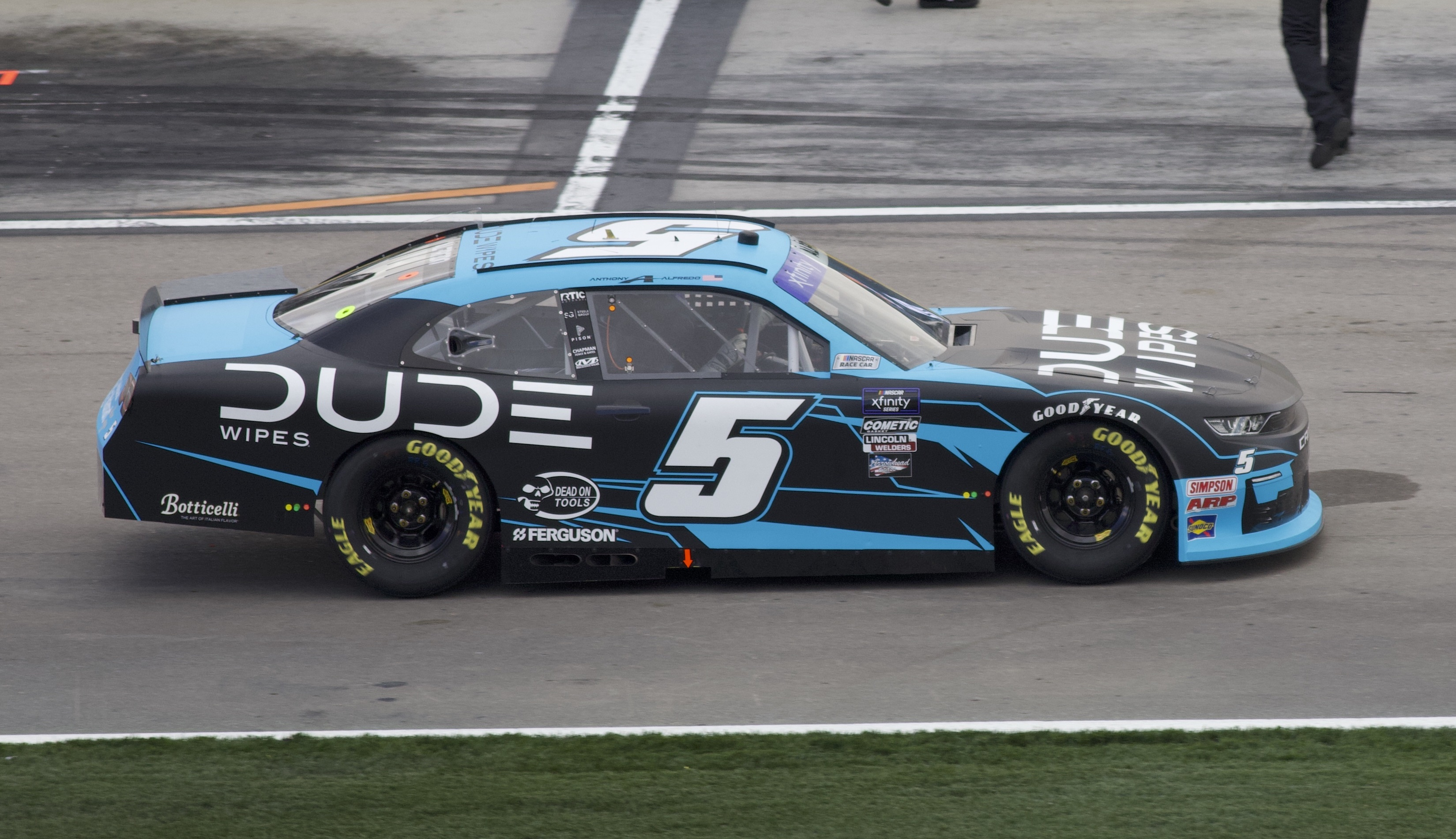
Alfredo's No. 5 car at Las Vegas Motor Speedway in 2024.

On December 7, 2023, it was announced Alfredo rejoined the team in the No. 5 full-time in 2024.

In 2025, it was announced that Kris Wright would drive full-time for the team, that lasted until after Sonoma, when it was announced that Kaz Grala would substitute the next weekend at Dover. Wright confirmed he had mutually parted ways with the team. Before the race at Dover, it was announced that the team would cease operations entirely following the event.

== Xfinity Series ==
=== Car No. 02 history ===
Multiple Drivers (2020-2023)

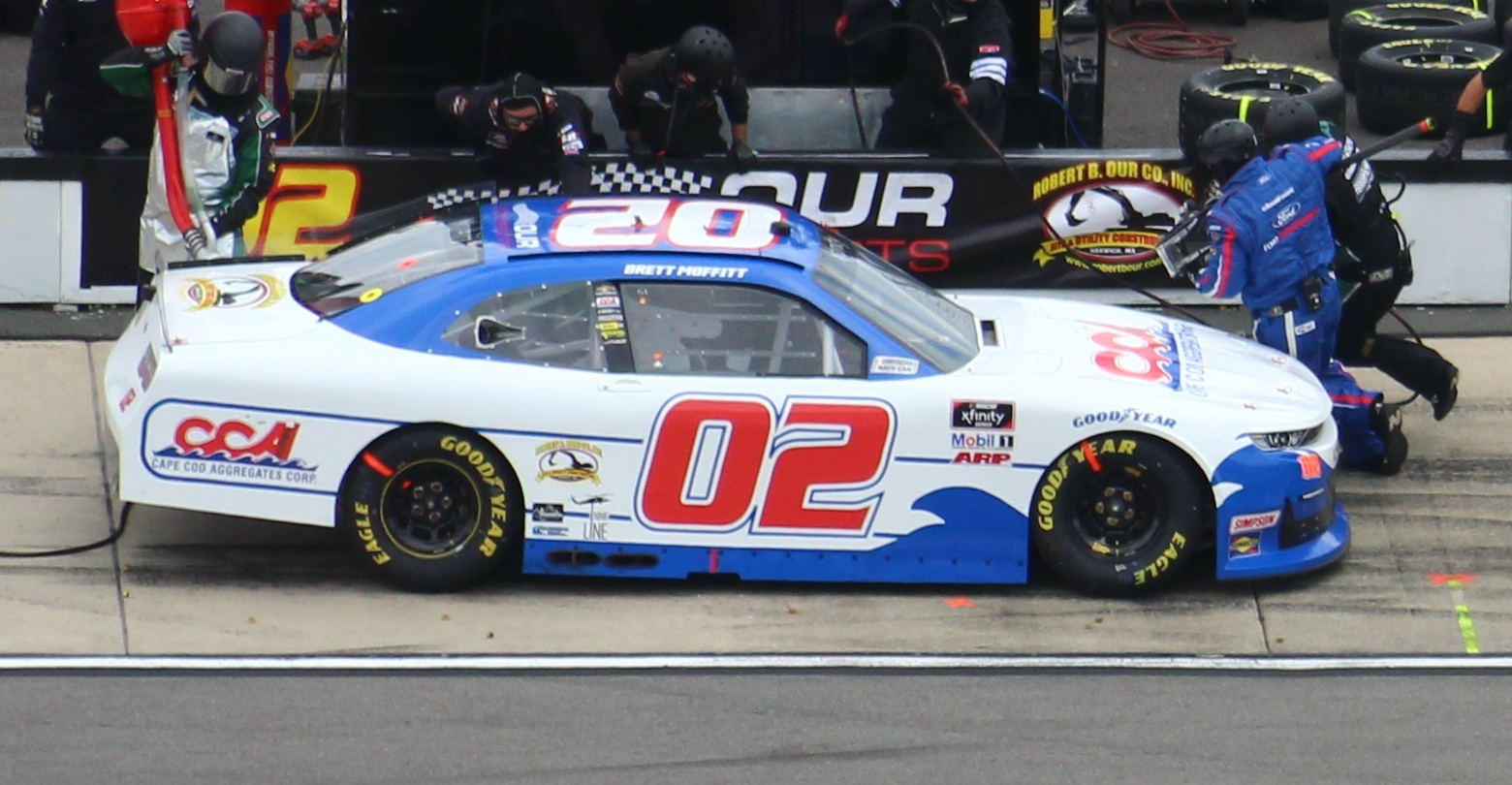
Brett Moffitt in the No. 02 at Pocono Raceway in 2020

In 2020, Brett Moffitt would run 4 races for the team with Andy Seuss and others running a few races. This would later change as Andy Seuss parted ways with Our, as Moffitt did so well in the 02 that he nearly ran the full season, with only missing a few races, which were run by Patrick Emerling, Jairo Avila Jr., and Andy Lally.

In 2021, Moffitt would run the full season again except for 2 races due to health issues, with Ty Dillon driving.

In 2022, Moffitt would return full-time, but after the Pennzoil 150 those plans changed and it was announced that he and the team had agreed to part ways. Blaine Perkins was chosen as Moffitt's replacement.

==== Car No. 02 results ====
Year	Driver	No.	Make	1	2	3	4	5	6	7	8	9	10	11	12	13	14	15	16	17	18	19	20	21	22	23	24	25	26	27	28	29	30	31	32	33	NXSC	Pts
2020	Brett Moffitt	02	Chevy	DAY; 24	LVS; 15	CAL; 14	PHO; 19	DAR; 11	CLT; 6		ATL; 14	HOM; 35		TAL; 5	POC; 7	IRC; 36	KEN; 10	KEN; 17	TEX; 16	KAN; 34			DOV; 15	DOV; 10	DAY; 27	DAR; 33	RCH; 6	RCH; 18	BRI; 26	LVS; 14	TAL; 27	ROV; 38	KAN; 7	TEX; 14	MAR; 13	PHO; 19	15th	671
2020	Patrick Emerling	02	Chevy							BRI; 29																											15th	671
2020	Jairo Avila Jr.	02	Chevy										HOM; 37																								15th	671
2020	Andy Lally	02	Chevy																		ROA; 5	DAY; 5															15th	671
2021	Brett Moffitt	02	Chevy	DAY; 2	DRC; 11	HOM; 7	LVS; 34	PHO; 9	ATL; 40	MAR; 12	TAL; 17	DAR; 8	DOV; 13	COA; 12	CLT; 25	MOH; 31	TEX; 8	NSH; 23	POC; 11	ROA; 31	ATL; 6	NHA; 9	GLN; 26	IRC; 31	MCH; 8	DAY; 11			BRI; 40	LVS; 12	TAL; 26	ROV; 37	TEX; 16	KAN; 6	MAR; 19	PHO; 8	16th	709
2021	Ty Dillon	02	Chevy																								DAR; 13	RCH; 11									16th	709
2022	Brett Moffitt	02	Chevy	DAY; 34	CAL; 19	LVS; 8	PHO; 15	ATL; 14	COA; 7	RCH; 25	MAR; 37	TAL; 10	DOV; 13	DAR; 13	TEX; 29	CLT; 11	PIR; 20	NSH; 10	ROA; 35	ATL; 20	NHA; 14	POC; 18	IRC; 16														19th	562
2022	Blaine Perkins	02	Chevy																					MCH; 32	GLN; 29	DAY; 17					TAL; 36				MAR; 10		19th	562
2022	Ty Dillon	02	Chevy																								DAR; 35										19th	562
2022	Brandon Brown	02	Chevy																									KAN; 17									19th	562
2022	Sage Karam	02	Chevy																										BRI; 18			CLT; 30					19th	562
2022	Parker Retzlaff	02	Chevy																											TEX; 21			LVS; 21	HOM; 16		PHO; 21	19th	562
2023	David Starr	02	Chevy	DAY; 22	CAL; 35																																32nd	332
2023	Kyle Weatherman	02	Chevy			LVS; 16	PHO; 17	ATL; 33	COA; 22				DOV; 14																								32nd	332
2023	Blaine Perkins	02	Chevy							RCH; 26	MAR; 13	TAL; 34		DAR; 37	CLT; 37	PIR; 15	SON; 30	NSH; 26	CSC; 17	ATL; 32	NHA; 25	POC; 27	ROA; 17	MCH; 33	IRC; 31	GLN; 38	DAY; 25	DAR; 34	KAN; 33	BRI; 28	TEX; DNQ	ROV; 28	LVS; 28	HOM; 29	MAR; 22	PHO; 32	32nd	332

=== Car No. 03 history ===
Tyler Reddick & Andy Lally (2021)

In 2021, Tyler Reddick attempted to qualify this car at Daytona, but failed to qualify due to qualifying being rained out. Later entries were submitted with Andy Lally as the driver listed, but failed to qualify since the car was outside the top 40 in owners points and a lack of qualifying and wouldn't appear on the entry list following Dover. The 03 hasn't attempted a race since.

==== Car No. 03 results ====
Year	Driver	No.	Make	1	2	3	4	5	6	7	8	9	10	11	12	13	14	15	16	17	18	19	20	21	22	23	24	25	26	27	28	29	30	31	32	33	NXSC	Pts
2021	Tyler Reddick	03	Chevy	DAY; DNQ		HOM; DNQ																															NA	0^{1}
2021	Andy Lally	03	Chevy		DAY; DNQ		LVS; DNQ	PHO; DNQ	ATL; DNQ	MAR; DNQ	TAL; DNQ	DAR; DNQ	DOV; DNQ	COA	CLT	MOH	TEX	NSH	POC	ROA	ATL	NHA	GLN	IRC	MCH	DAY	DAR	RCH	BRI	LVS	TAL	ROV	TEX	KAN	MAR	PHO	NA	0^{1}

=== Car No. 5 history ===
Anthony Alfredo (2024)

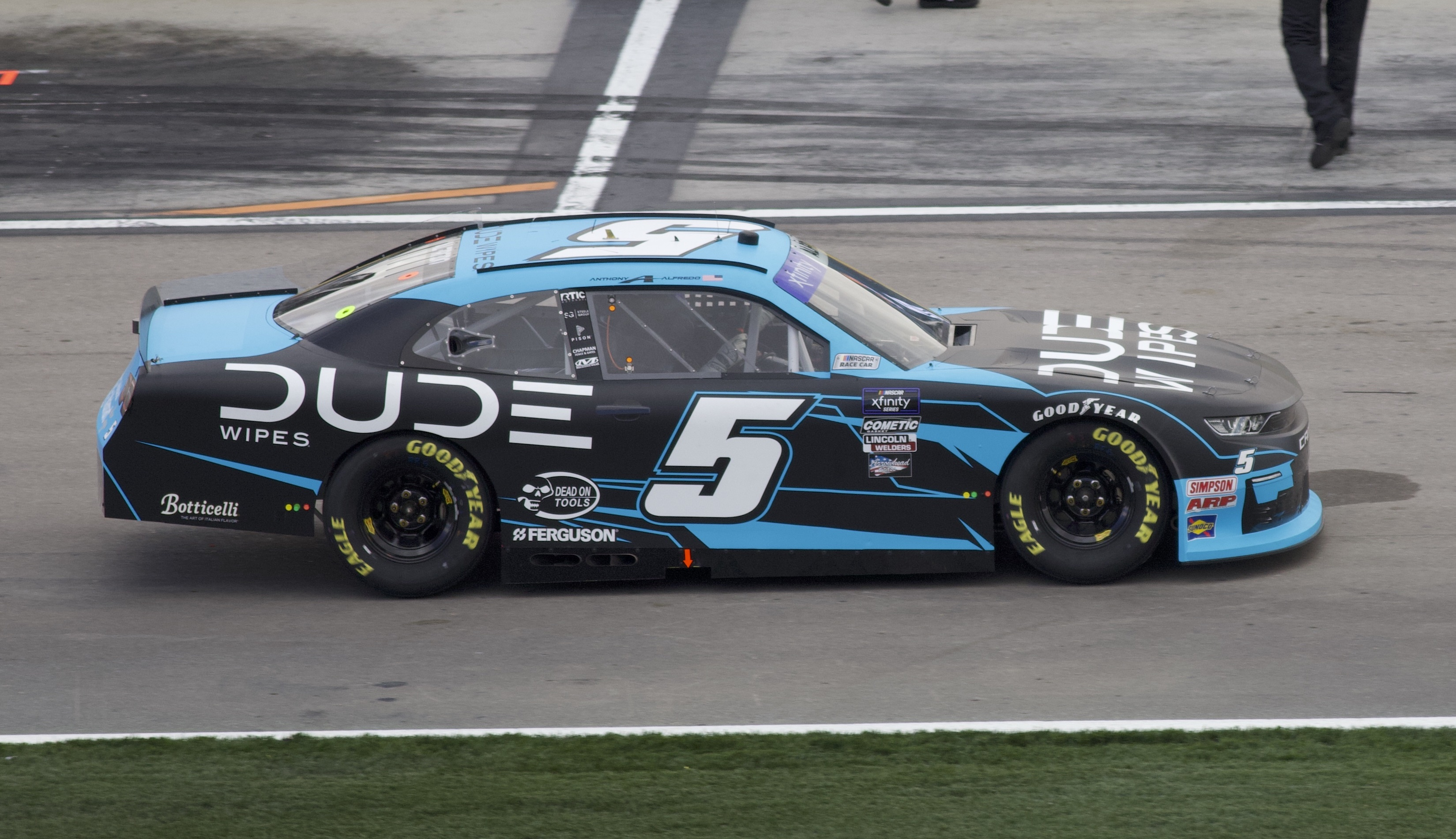
Alfredo's No. 5 car at Las Vegas Motor Speedway in 2024.

In December 2023, it was announced that Anthony Alfredo would return full-time to Our Motorsports in 2024, this time driving the No. 5 car. Following the Phoenix championship race, Alfredo was fined US$25,000 and docked 25 driver points for intentionally wrecking Stefan Parsons during the race.

Multiple-drivers (2025)

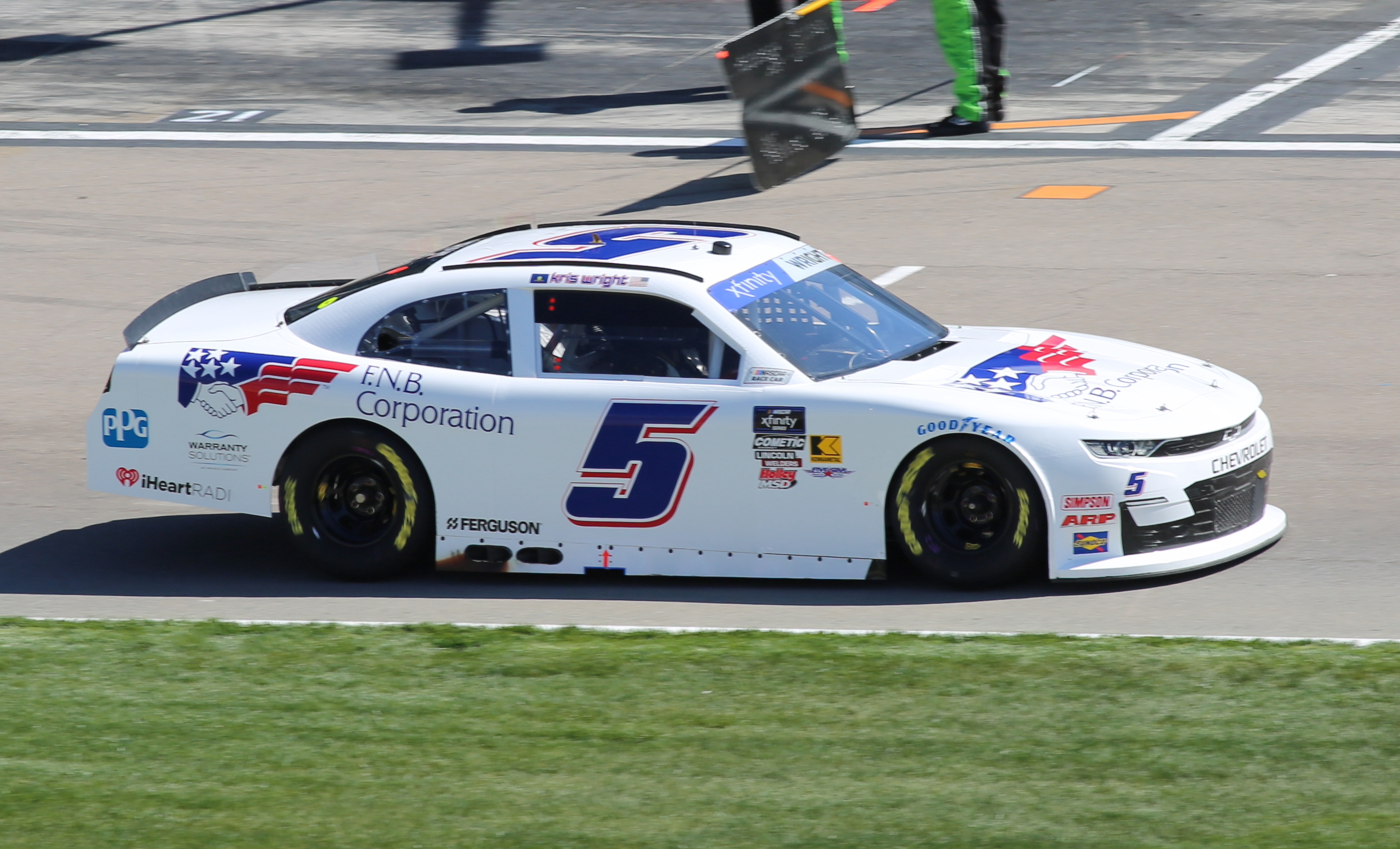
Kris Wright in the No. 5 car at Las Vegas Motor Speedway in 2025.

In November 2024, it was announced that Kris Wright would drive full-time to Our Motorsports in 2025, driving the No. 5 car. On July 15, after Kaz Grala replaced Wright in entry list for Dover, Wright confirmed he had mutually parted ways with the team. As a result of this, on July 18, the team announced they would cease operations entirely after Dover.

==== Car No. 5 results ====
Year	Driver	No.	Make	1	2	3	4	5	6	7	8	9	10	11	12	13	14	15	16	17	18	19	20	21	22	23	24	25	26	27	28	29	30	31	32	33	NXSC	Pts
2024	Anthony Alfredo	5	Chevy	DAY; 24	ATL; 7	LVS; 16	PHO; 10	COA; 12	RCH; 29	MAR; 15	TEX; 10	TAL; 3	DOV; 9	DAR; 14	CLT; 16	PIR; 32	SON; 31	IOW; 15	NHA; 20	NSH; 18	CSC; 30	POC; 14	IND; 34	MCH; 4	DAY; 26	DAR; 26	ATL; 14	GLN; 34	BRI; 11	KAN; 15	TAL; 29	ROV; 16	LVS; 19	HOM; 15	MAR; 7	PHO; 36	17th	641
2025	Kris Wright	5	Chevy	DAY; 32	ATL; 26	COA; 33	PHO; 25	LVS; 25	HOM; 32	MAR; 9	DAR; 38	BRI; 31	CAR; 28	TAL; 24	TEX; 33	CLT; 18	NSH; 31	MXC; 17	POC; 37	ATL; 25	CSC; DNQ	SON; 29																
2025	Kaz Grala	5	Chevy																				DOV; 31	IND	IOW	GLN	DAY	PIR	GTW	BRI	KAN	ROV	LVS	TAL	MAR	PHO		

=== Car No. 23 history ===
Multiple Drivers (2021)

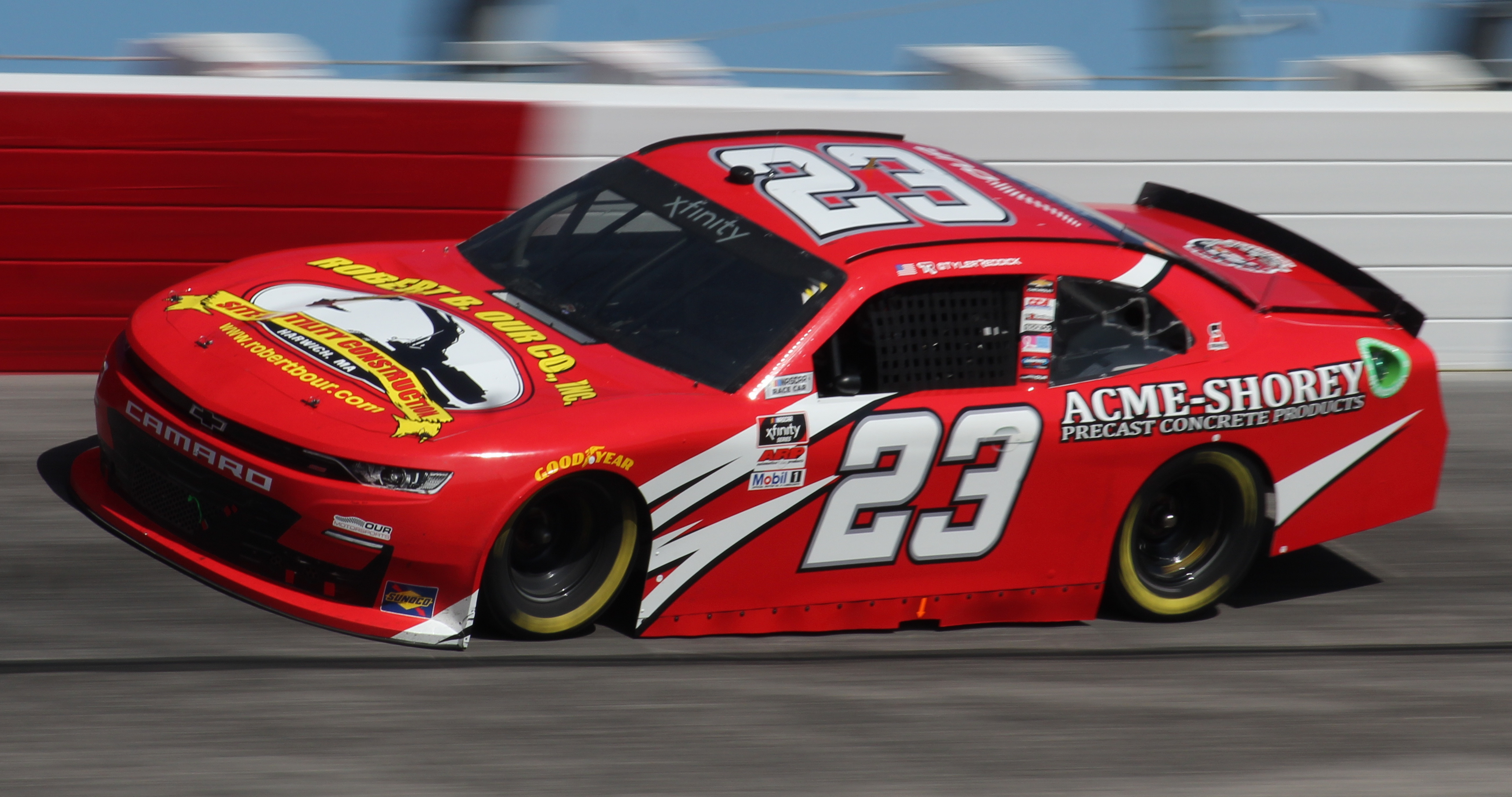
Tyler Reddick in the No. 23 at Darlington Raceway in 2021

In 2021, owner points were from RSS Racing and Reaume Brothers Racing's No. 23, with Tyler Reddick, Blaine Perkins, Natalie Decker, J. J. Yeley, Andy Lally, Ty Dillon, Patrick Emerling, and Austin Dillon split the seat time.

Anthony Alfredo (2022)

For 2022, Anthony Alfredo would drive the 23 car full-time while its owners points were bought by Emerling-Gase Motorsports.

==== Car No. 23 results ====
Year	Driver	No.	Make	1	2	3	4	5	6	7	8	9	10	11	12	13	14	15	16	17	18	19	20	21	22	23	24	25	26	27	28	29	30	31	32	33	NXSC	Pts
2021	Tyler Reddick	23	Chevy	DAY	DRC	HOM	LVS; 12																		MCH; 16		DAR; 7										20th	513
2021	Blaine Perkins	23	Chevy					PHO; 24	ATL; 30	MAR; 35									POC; 34							DAY; 23				LVS; 20	TAL; 13					PHO; 16	20th	513
2021	Natalie Decker	23	Chevy								TAL; 24							NSH; 26		ROA; 32															MAR; 25		20th	513
2021	Tanner Berryhill	23	Chevy									DAR; 21					TEX; 39																TEX; 37				20th	513
2021	J. J. Yeley	23	Chevy										DOV; 14																								20th	513
2021	Andy Lally	23	Chevy											COA; 18		MOH; 5																					20th	513
2021	Ty Dillon	23	Chevy												CLT; 7						ATL; 5								BRI; 15			CLT; 26					20th	513
2021	Patrick Emerling	23	Chevy																			NHA; 31						RCH; 32						KAN; 24			20th	513
2021	Austin Dillon	23	Chevy																				GLN; 37	IRC; 6													20th	513
2022	Anthony Alfredo	23	Chevy	DAY; 7	CAL; 5	LVS; 17	PHO; 37	ATL; 16	COA; 13	RCH; 12	MAR; 14	TAL; 6	DOV; 15	DAR; 15	TEX; 32	CLT; 33	PIR; 31	NSH; 20	ROA; 23	ATL; 14	NHA; 29	POC; 16	IRC; 18	MCH; 14	GLN; 18	DAY; 32	DAR; 37	KAN; 18	BRI; 13	TEX; 19	TAL; 16	ROV; 12	LVS; 10	HOM; 18	MAR; 21	PHO; 35	17th	633

=== Car No. 27 history ===
Jeb Burton (2022)

In 2022, Jeb Burton drove the No. 27 car full-time. On October 28, he announced he would be leaving Our Motorsports at the end of the 2022 season.

==== Car No. 27 results ====
Year	Driver	No.	Make	1	2	3	4	5	6	7	8	9	10	11	12	13	14	15	16	17	18	19	20	21	22	23	24	25	26	27	28	29	30	31	32	33	NXSC	Pts
2022	Jeb Burton	27	Chevy	DAY; 19	CAL; 14	LVS; 19	PHO; 12	ATL; 15	COA; 23	RCH; 11	MAR; 32	TAL; 15	DOV; 16	DAR; 14	TEX; 13	CLT; 12	PIR; 33	NSH; 35	ROA; 21	ATL; 13	NHA; 33	POC; 33	IRC; 38	MCH; 22	GLN; 37	DAY; 21	DAR; 24	KAN; 38	BRI; 15	TEX; 15	TAL; 17	ROV; 18	LVS; 17	HOM; 19	MAR; 11	PHO; 16	20th	560
