= 2022 Drive for the Cure 250 =

29th race of the 2022 NASCAR Xfinity Series

2022 Drive for the Cure 250 presented by BlueCross BlueShield of North Carolina
Race details
- Race 29 of 33 of the 2022 NASCAR Xfinity Series
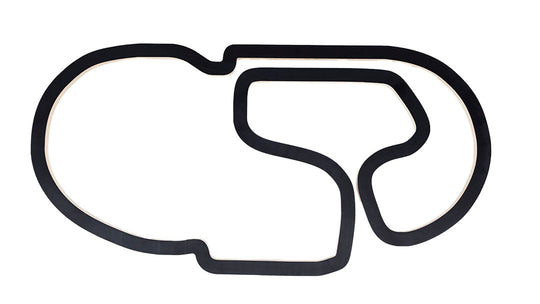
- Date: October 8, 2022
- Official name: 50th Annual Drive for the Cure 250
- Location: Charlotte Motor Speedway, Concord, North Carolina
- Course: Permanent racing facility
- Course length: 2.280 miles (3.669 km)
- Distance: 72 laps, 167.04 mi (268.824 km)
- Scheduled distance: 67 laps, 152.760 mi (245.843 km)
- Average speed: 70.771 mph (113.895 km/h)

Pole position
Driver	A. J. Allmendinger	Kaulig Racing
- Time: 1:21.694

Most laps led
Driver	A. J. Allmendinger	Kaulig Racing
- Laps: 25

Winner
No. 16	A. J. Allmendinger	Kaulig Racing

Television in the United States
- Network: NBC
- Announcers: Rick Allen, Jeff Burton, and Steve Letarte

Radio in the United States
- Radio: Performance Racing Network

The 2022 Drive for the Cure 250 presented by BlueCross BlueShield of North Carolina was the 29th stock car race of the 2022 NASCAR Xfinity Series, the final race of the Round of 12, and the 50th iteration of the event. The race was held on Saturday, October 8, 2022, in Concord, North Carolina at the Charlotte Motor Speedway Roval, a 2.280 miles (3.669 km) permanent road course. The race was increased from 67 laps to 72 laps, due to several NASCAR overtime finishes. A. J. Allmendinger, driving for Kaulig Racing, held off Ty Gibbs in the final few laps to earn his 15th career NASCAR Xfinity Series win, and his fifth of the season. To fill out the podium, Noah Gragson, driving for JR Motorsports, would finish 3rd, respectively. Allmendinger and Gibbs would mostly dominate, leading 25 and 24 laps.

Eight drivers would advance into the next round of the playoffs: Noah Gragson, A. J. Allmendinger, Ty Gibbs, Justin Allgaier, Josh Berry, Austin Hill, Brandon Jones, and Sam Mayer. Ryan Sieg, Daniel Hemric, Riley Herbst, and Jeremy Clements would fail to advance.

This was the debut race for the former F1 driver, Daniil Kvyat, and the current IndyCar driver, Marco Andretti.

== Background ==
Since 2018, deviating from past NASCAR events at Charlotte, the race will utilize a road course configuration of Charlotte Motor Speedway, promoted and trademarked as the "Roval". The course is 2.280 miles (3.669 km) in length and features 17 turns, utilizing the infield road course and portions of the oval track.

During July 2018 tests on the road course, concerns were raised over drivers "cheating" the backstretch chicane on the course. The chicanes were modified with additional tire barriers and rumble strips in order to encourage drivers to properly drive through them, and NASCAR will enforce drive-through penalties on drivers who illegally "short-cut" parts of the course. The chicanes will not be used during restarts. In the summer of 2019, the bus stop on the backstretch was changed and deepened, becoming a permanent part of the circuit, compared to the previous year where it was improvised.

If a driver fails to legally make the backstretch bus stop, they must skip the front-stretch chicane and make a complete stop by the dotted line on the exit, before being allowed to continue. A driver who misses the front-stretch chicane, must also stop before the exit.

=== Entry list ===
- (R) denotes rookie driver.
- (i) denotes driver who are ineligible for series driver points.

#	Driver	Team	Make
1	Sam Mayer	JR Motorsports	Chevrolet
02	Sage Karam	Our Motorsports	Chevrolet
2	Sheldon Creed (R)	Richard Childress Racing	Chevrolet
4	Bayley Currey	JD Motorsports	Chevrolet
5	Scott Heckert	B. J. McLeod Motorsports	Ford
6	Ryan Vargas	JD Motorsports	Chevrolet
07	Joe Graf Jr.	SS-Green Light Racing	Ford
7	Justin Allgaier	JR Motorsports	Chevrolet
08	Andy Lally	SS-Green Light Racing	Ford
8	Josh Berry	JR Motorsports	Chevrolet
9	Noah Gragson	JR Motorsports	Chevrolet
10	Landon Cassill	Kaulig Racing	Chevrolet
11	Daniel Hemric	Kaulig Racing	Chevrolet
13	Timmy Hill (i)	MBM Motorsports	Chevrolet
16	A. J. Allmendinger	Kaulig Racing	Chevrolet
18	James Davison	Joe Gibbs Racing	Toyota
19	Brandon Jones	Joe Gibbs Racing	Toyota
21	Austin Hill (R)	Richard Childress Racing	Chevrolet
23	Anthony Alfredo	Our Motorsports	Chevrolet
26	Daniil Kvyat	Sam Hunt Racing	Toyota
27	Jeb Burton	Our Motorsports	Chevrolet
31	Myatt Snider	Jordan Anderson Racing	Chevrolet
32	Austin Wayne Self (i)	Jordan Anderson Racing	Chevrolet
34	Kaz Grala (i)	Jesse Iwuji Motorsports	Chevrolet
35	Brad Perez (i)	Emerling-Gase Motorsports	Ford
36	Alex Labbé	DGM Racing	Chevrolet
38	Patrick Gallagher	RSS Racing	Ford
39	Ryan Sieg	RSS Racing	Ford
44	Josh Bilicki (i)	Alpha Prime Racing	Chevrolet
45	Stefan Parsons	Alpha Prime Racing	Chevrolet
47	Gray Gaulding	Mike Harmon Racing	Chevrolet
48	Marco Andretti (i)	Big Machine Racing	Chevrolet
51	Jeremy Clements	Jeremy Clements Racing	Chevrolet
52	Brennan Poole (i)	Jimmy Means Racing	Chevrolet
54	Ty Gibbs	Joe Gibbs Racing	Toyota
66	J. J. Yeley	MBM Motorsports	Toyota
68	Kris Wright	Brandonbilt Motorsports	Chevrolet
78	Brandon Brown	B. J. McLeod Motorsports	Chevrolet
91	Preston Pardus	DGM Racing	Chevrolet
92	Josh Williams	DGM Racing	Chevrolet
98	Riley Herbst	Stewart-Haas Racing	Ford
Official entry list

== Practice ==
The only 20-minute practice session was held on Saturday, October 8, at 10:00 AM EST. A. J. Allmendinger, driving for Kaulig Racing, would set the fastest time in the session, with a lap of 1:23.147, and an average speed of 100.449 mph (161.657 km/h).

Pos.	#	Driver	Team	Make	Time	Speed
1	16	A. J. Allmendinger	Kaulig Racing	Chevrolet	1:23.147	100.449
2	19	Brandon Jones	Joe Gibbs Racing	Toyota	1:23.210	100.373
3	54	Ty Gibbs	Joe Gibbs Racing	Toyota	1:23.330	100.228
Full practice results

== Qualifying ==
Qualifying was held on Saturday, October 8, at 10:30 AM EST. Since the Charlotte Motor Speedway Roval is a road course, the qualifying system used is a two group system, with two rounds. Drivers will be separated into two groups, Group A and Group B. Each driver will have a lap to set a time. The fastest 5 drivers from each group will advance to the final round. The fastest driver to set a time in the round will win the pole. A. J. Allmendinger, driving for Kaulig Racing, would score the pole for the race, with a lap of 1:21.694, and an average speed of 102.235 mph (164.531 km/h) in the second round.

Pos.	#	Driver	Team	Make	Time (R1)	Speed (R1)	Time (R2)	Speed (R2)
1	16	A. J. Allmendinger	Kaulig Racing	Chevrolet	1:21.612	102.338	1:21.694	102.235
2	54	Ty Gibbs	Joe Gibbs Racing	Toyota	1:22.243	101.553	1:21.767	102.144
3	11	Daniel Hemric	Kaulig Racing	Chevrolet	1:22.015	101.835	1:22.098	101.732
4	2	Sheldon Creed (R)	Richard Childress Racing	Chevrolet	1.22.131	101.691	1:22.365	101.402
5	7	Justin Allgaier	JR Motorsports	Chevrolet	1:22.370	101.396	1:22.510	101.224
6	1	Sam Mayer	JR Motorsports	Chevrolet	1:22.103	101.726	1:22.734	100.950
7	10	Landon Cassill	Kaulig Racing	Chevrolet	1:22.528	101.202	1:22.743	100.939
8	21	Austin Hill (R)	Richard Childress Racing	Chevrolet	1:22.558	101.165	1:22.914	100.731
9	02	Sage Karam	Our Motorsports	Chevrolet	1:22.557	101.166	1:23.083	100.526
10	51	Jeremy Clements	Jeremy Clements Racing	Chevrolet	1:22.583	101.135	-	-
Eliminated from Round 1
11	98	Riley Herbst	Stewart-Haas Racing	Ford	1:22.567	101.154	-	-
12	36	Alex Labbé	DGM Racing	Chevrolet	1:22.577	101.142	-	-
13	45	Stefan Parsons (i)	Alpha Prime Racing	Chevrolet	1:22.782	100.891	-	-
14	8	Josh Berry	JR Motorsports	Chevrolet	1:22.860	100.797	-	-
15	19	Brandon Jones	Joe Gibbs Racing	Toyota	1:22.922	100.721	-	-
16	18	James Davison	Joe Gibbs Racing	Toyota	1:23.031	100.589	-	-
17	39	Ryan Sieg	RSS Racing	Ford	1:23.061	100.553	-	-
18	23	Anthony Alfredo	Our Motorsports	Chevrolet	1:23.076	100.534	-	-
19	91	Preston Pardus	DGM Racing	Chevrolet	1:23.132	100.467	-	-
20	44	Josh Bilicki (i)	Alpha Prime Racing	Chevrolet	1:23.199	100.386	-	-
21	34	Kaz Grala (i)	Jesse Iwuji Motorsports	Chevrolet	1:23.337	100.220	-	-
22	92	Josh Williams	DGM Racing	Chevrolet	1:23.382	100.166	-	-
23	27	Jeb Burton	Our Motorsports	Chevrolet	1:23.468	100.062	-	-
24	26	Daniil Kvyat	Sam Hunt Racing	Toyota	1:23.706	99.778	-	-
25	66	J. J. Yeley	MBM Motorsports	Toyota	1:23.729	99.750	-	-
26	5	Scott Heckert	B. J. McLeod Motorsports	Chevrolet	1:23.981	99.451	-	-
27	35	Brad Perez (i)	Emerling-Gase Motorsports	Toyota	1:23.995	99.434	-	-
28	38	Patrick Gallagher	RSS Racing	Ford	1:24.018	99.407	-	-
29	08	Andy Lally	SS-Green Light Racing	Ford	1:24.143	99.260	-	-
30	48	Marco Andretti (i)	Big Machine Racing	Chevrolet	1:24.175	99.222	-	-
31	31	Myatt Snider	Jordan Anderson Racing	Chevrolet	1:24.385	98.975	-	-
32	4	Bayley Currey	JD Motorsports	Chevrolet	1:24.651	98.664	-	-
33	78	Brandon Brown	B. J. McLeod Motorsports	Chevrolet	1:24.688	98.621	-	-
Qualified by owner's points
34	13	Timmy Hill (i)	MBM Motorsports	Toyota	1:24.713	98.592	-	-
35	07	Joe Graf Jr.	SS-Green Light Racing	Ford	1.25.220	98.005	-	-
36	6	Ryan Vargas	JD Motorsports	Chevrolet	1:25.269	97.949	-	-
37	9	Noah Gragson	JR Motorsports	Chevrolet	-	-	-	-
38	68	Kris Wright	Brandonbilt Motorsports	Chevrolet	-	-	-	-
Failed to qualify
39	47	Gray Gaulding	Mike Harmon Racing	Chevrolet	1:24.841	98.443	-	-
40	52	Brennan Poole (i)	Jimmy Means Racing	Chevrolet	1.24.947	98.320	-	-
41	32	Austin Wayne Self (i)	Jordan Anderson Racing	Chevrolet	1:25.450	97.741	-	-
Official qualifying results
Official starting lineup

== Race results ==
Stage 1 Laps: 20

Pos.	#	Driver	Team	Make	Pts
1	16	A. J. Allmendinger	Kaulig Racing	Chevrolet	10
2	54	Ty Gibbs	Joe Gibbs Racing	Toyota	9
3	1	Sam Mayer	JR Motorsports	Chevrolet	8
4	21	Austin Hill (R)	Richard Childress Racing	Chevrolet	7
5	98	Riley Herbst	Stewart-Haas Racing	Ford	6
6	7	Justin Allgaier	JR Motorsports	Chevrolet	5
7	18	James Davison	Joe Gibbs Racing	Toyota	4
8	10	Landon Cassill	Kaulig Racing	Chevrolet	3
9	8	Josh Berry	JR Motorsports	Chevrolet	2
10	02	Sage Karam	Our Motorsports	Chevrolet	1

Stage 2 Laps: 20

Pos.	#	Driver	Team	Make	Pts
1	19	Brandon Jones	Joe Gibbs Racing	Toyota	10
2	98	Riley Herbst	Stewart-Haas Racing	Ford	9
3	1	Sam Mayer	JR Motorsports	Chevrolet	8
4	7	Justin Allgaier	JR Motorsports	Chevrolet	7
5	18	James Davison	Joe Gibbs Racing	Toyota	6
6	11	Daniel Hemric	Kaulig Racing	Chevrolet	5
7	8	Josh Berry	JR Motorsports	Chevrolet	4
8	23	Anthony Alfredo	Our Motorsports	Chevrolet	3
9	2	Sheldon Creed (R)	Richard Childress Racing	Chevrolet	2
10	54	Ty Gibbs	Joe Gibbs Racing	Toyota	1

Stage 3 Laps: 32*

Fin.	St	#	Driver	Team	Make	Laps	Led	Status	Pts
1	1	16	A. J. Allmendinger	Kaulig Racing	Chevrolet	72	25	Running	50
2	2	54	Ty Gibbs	Joe Gibbs Racing	Toyota	72	24	Running	45
3	37	9	Noah Gragson	JR Motorsports	Chevrolet	72	1	Running	34
4	16	18	James Davison	Joe Gibbs Racing	Toyota	72	0	Running	43
5	5	7	Justin Allgaier	JR Motorsports	Chevrolet	72	0	Running	44
6	12	36	Alex Labbé	DGM Racing	Chevrolet	72	0	Running	31
7	15	19	Brandon Jones	Joe Gibbs Racing	Toyota	72	3	Running	40
8	14	8	Josh Berry	JR Motorsports	Chevrolet	72	0	Running	35
9	17	39	Ryan Sieg	RSS Racing	Ford	72	0	Running	28
10	7	10	Landon Cassill	Kaulig Racing	Chevrolet	72	0	Running	30
11	6	1	Sam Mayer	JR Motorsports	Chevrolet	72	0	Running	42
12	18	23	Anthony Alfredo	Our Motorsports	Chevrolet	72	0	Running	28
13	31	31	Myatt Snider	Jordan Anderson Racing	Chevrolet	72	0	Running	24
14	10	51	Jeremy Clements	Jeremy Clements Racing	Chevrolet	72	0	Running	23
15	24	26	Daniil Kvyat	Sam Hunt Racing	Toyota	72	0	Running	22
16	4	2	Sheldon Creed (R)	Richard Childress Racing	Chevrolet	72	18	Running	23
17	3	11	Daniel Hemric	Kaulig Racing	Chevrolet	72	0	Running	25
18	23	27	Jeb Burton	Our Motorsports	Chevrolet	72	0	Running	19
19	25	66	J. J. Yeley	MBM Motorsports	Toyota	72	0	Running	18
20	33	78	Brandon Brown	B. J. McLeod Motorsports	Chevrolet	72	0	Running	17
21	19	91	Preston Pardus	DGM Racing	Chevrolet	72	0	Running	16
22	26	5	Scott Heckert	B. J. McLeod Motorsports	Chevrolet	72	0	Running	15
23	27	35	Brad Perez (i)	Emerling-Gase Motorsports	Toyota	72	0	Running	0
24	36	6	Ryan Vargas	JD Motorsports	Chevrolet	72	0	Running	13
25	13	45	Stefan Parsons (i)	Alpha Prime Racing	Chevrolet	72	0	Running	0
26	32	4	Bayley Currey	JD Motorsports	Chevrolet	72	0	Running	11
27	35	07	Joe Graf Jr.	SS-Green Light Racing	Ford	72	0	Running	10
28	34	13	Timmy Hill (i)	MBM Motorsports	Toyota	72	0	Running	0
29	8	21	Austin Hill (R)	Richard Childress Racing	Chevrolet	70	0	Running	15
30	9	02	Sage Karam	Our Motorsports	Chevrolet	70	0	Running	8
31	29	08	Andy Lally	SS-Green Light Racing	Ford	69	0	Running	6
32	11	98	Riley Herbst	Stewart-Haas Racing	Ford	67	1	Accident	20
33	28	38	Patrick Gallagher	RSS Racing	Ford	67	0	Engine	4
34	20	44	Josh Bilicki (i)	Alpha Prime Racing	Chevrlet	66	0	Running	0
35	21	34	Kaz Grala (i)	Jesse Iwuji Motorsports	Chevrolet	59	0	Accident	0
36	30	48	Marco Andretti (i)	Big Machine Racing	Chevrolet	45	0	Accident	1
37	22	92	Josh Williams	DGM Racing	Chevrolet	35	0	Track Bar	1
38	38	68	Kris Wright	Brandonbilt Motorsports	Chevrolet	7	0	Accident	1
Official race results

== Standings after the race ==
Drivers' Championship standings

	Pos	Driver	Points
1	1	Noah Gragson	3,056
1	2	A. J. Allmendinger	3,044 (-12)
	3	Ty Gibbs	3,038 (-18)
2	4	Justin Allgaier	3,033 (-23)
	5	Josh Berry	3,022 (-34)
2	6	Austin Hill	3,018 (-38)
4	7	Brandon Jones	3,011 (-45)
1	8	Sam Mayer	3,005 (-51)
1	9	Ryan Sieg	2,098 (-958)
1	10	Daniel Hemric	2,089 (-967)
1	11	Riley Herbst	2,080 (-976)
	12	Jeremy Clements	2,046 (-1,010)
Official driver's standings

- Note: Only the first 12 positions are included for the driver standings.

Previous race: 2022 Sparks 300	NASCAR Xfinity Series; 2022 season	Next race: 2022 Alsco Uniforms 302
