= 2022 Contender Boats 300 =

31st race of the 2022 NASCAR Xfinity Series

Race details
- Race 31 of 33 of the 2022 NASCAR Xfinity Series
- Date: October 22, 2022
- Official name: 29th Annual Contender Boats 300
- Location: Homestead–Miami Speedway, Homestead, Florida
- Course: Permanent racing facility
- Course length: 1.5 miles (2.4 km)
- Distance: 200 laps, 300 mi (482.803 km)
- Scheduled distance: 200 laps, 300 mi (482.803 km)
- Average speed: 124.884 mph (200.981 km/h)

Pole position
| Driver | Trevor Bayne | Joe Gibbs Racing |
- Time: 32.400

Most laps led
| Driver | Noah Gragson | JR Motorsports |
- Laps: 127

Winner
| No. 9 | Noah Gragson | JR Motorsports |

Television in the United States
- Network: NBC
- Announcers: Rick Allen, Jeff Burton, and Steve Letarte

Radio in the United States
- Radio: Motor Racing Network

The 2022 Contender Boats 300 was the 31st stock car race of the 2022 NASCAR Xfinity Series, the second race of the Round of 8, and the 29th iteration of the event. The race was held on Saturday, October 22, 2022, in Homestead, Florida at Homestead–Miami Speedway, a 1.5 miles (2.4 km) permanent oval shaped racetrack. The race took the scheduled 200 laps to complete. Noah Gragson, driving for JR Motorsports, would win the race in a dominating fashion, leading 127 laps for his 13th career NASCAR Xfinity Series win, and his eighth of the season. He would also earn a spot in the championship 4. To fill out the podium, Ty Gibbs, driving for Joe Gibbs Racing, and A. J. Allmendinger, driving for Kaulig Racing, would finish 2nd and 3rd, respectively.

== Background ==
Homestead–Miami Speedway is a motor racing track located in Homestead, Florida. The track, which has several configurations, has promoted several series of racing, including NASCAR, the IndyCar Series, the WeatherTech SportsCar Championship series, and the Championship Cup Series.

From 2002 to 2019, Homestead–Miami Speedway had hosted the final race of the season in all three of NASCAR's series as Ford Championship Weekend: the NASCAR Cup Series, NASCAR Xfinity Series, and the NASCAR Camping World Truck Series. The races currently have the names Dixie Vodka 400, Contender Boats 250, and Baptist Health 200, respectively.

=== Entry list ===
- (R) denotes rookie driver.
- (i) denotes driver who are ineligible for series driver points.

| # | Driver | Team | Make |
|---|---|---|---|
| 1 | Sam Mayer | JR Motorsports | Chevrolet |
| 02 | Parker Retzlaff | Our Motorsports | Chevrolet |
| 2 | Sheldon Creed (R) | Richard Childress Racing | Chevrolet |
| 4 | Bayley Currey | JD Motorsports | Chevrolet |
| 5 | Matt Mills (i) | B. J. McLeod Motorsports | Chevrolet |
| 6 | Brennan Poole (i) | JD Motorsports | Chevrolet |
| 07 | Joe Graf Jr. | SS-Green Light Racing | Ford |
| 7 | Justin Allgaier | JR Motorsports | Chevrolet |
| 08 | David Starr | SS-Green Light Racing | Ford |
| 8 | Josh Berry | JR Motorsports | Chevrolet |
| 9 | Noah Gragson | JR Motorsports | Chevrolet |
| 10 | Landon Cassill | Kaulig Racing | Chevrolet |
| 11 | Daniel Hemric | Kaulig Racing | Chevrolet |
| 13 | Timmy Hill (i) | MBM Motorsports | Chevrolet |
| 16 | A. J. Allmendinger | Kaulig Racing | Chevrolet |
| 18 | Trevor Bayne | Joe Gibbs Racing | Toyota |
| 19 | Brandon Jones | Joe Gibbs Racing | Toyota |
| 21 | Austin Hill (R) | Richard Childress Racing | Chevrolet |
| 23 | Anthony Alfredo | Our Motorsports | Chevrolet |
| 26 | Chandler Smith (i) | Sam Hunt Racing | Toyota |
| 27 | Jeb Burton | Our Motorsports | Chevrolet |
| 28 | Kyle Sieg | RSS Racing | Ford |
| 31 | Myatt Snider | Jordan Anderson Racing | Chevrolet |
| 34 | Kyle Weatherman | Jesse Iwuji Motorsports | Chevrolet |
| 35 | Patrick Emerling | Emerling-Gase Motorsports | Toyota |
| 36 | Josh Williams | DGM Racing | Chevrolet |
| 38 | C. J. McLaughlin | RSS Racing | Ford |
| 39 | Ryan Sieg | RSS Racing | Ford |
| 44 | Julia Landauer | Alpha Prime Racing | Chevrolet |
| 45 | Stefan Parsons (i) | Alpha Prime Racing | Chevrolet |
| 48 | Nick Sanchez | Big Machine Racing | Chevrolet |
| 51 | Jeremy Clements | Jeremy Clements Racing | Chevrolet |
| 54 | Ty Gibbs | Joe Gibbs Racing | Toyota |
| 66 | J. J. Yeley | MBM Motorsports | Ford |
| 68 | Kris Wright | Brandonbilt Motorsports | Chevrolet |
| 77 | Dillon Bassett | Bassett Racing | Chevrolet |
| 78 | B. J. McLeod | B. J. McLeod Motorsports | Chevrolet |
| 91 | Mason Massey | DGM Racing | Chevrolet |
| 92 | Alex Labbé | DGM Racing | Chevrolet |
| 98 | Riley Herbst | Stewart-Haas Racing | Ford |
Official entry list

== Practice ==
The only 20-minute practice session was held on Friday, October 21, at 6:05 PM EST. Noah Gragson, driving for JR Motorsports, would set the fastest time in the session, with a time of 32.743, and an average speed of 164.921 mph (265.415 km/h).

| Pos. | # | Driver | Team | Make | Time | Speed |
|---|---|---|---|---|---|---|
| 1 | 9 | Noah Gragson | JR Motorsports | Chevrolet | 32.743 | 164.921 |
| 2 | 10 | Landon Cassill | Kaulig Racing | Chevrolet | 32.782 | 164.725 |
| 3 | 11 | Daniel Hemric | Kaulig Racing | Chevrolet | 32.788 | 164.694 |
Full practice results

== Qualifying ==
Qualifying was held on Friday, October 21, at 6:35 PM EST. Since Homestead–Miami Speedway is an oval track, the qualifying system used is a single-car, one-lap system with only one round. Whoever sets the fastest time in the round wins the pole. Trevor Bayne, driving for Joe Gibbs Racing, would score the pole for the race, with a lap of 32.400, and an average speed of 166.667 mph (268.225 km/h). Alex Labbé and Dillon Bassett would fail to qualify.

| Pos. | # | Driver | Team | Make | Time | Speed |
|---|---|---|---|---|---|---|
| 1 | 18 | Trevor Bayne | Joe Gibbs Racing | Toyota | 32.400 | 166.667 |
| 2 | 9 | Noah Gragson | JR Motorsports | Chevrolet | 32.583 | 165.731 |
| 3 | 54 | Ty Gibbs | Joe Gibbs Racing | Toyota | 32.674 | 165.269 |
| 4 | 11 | Daniel Hemric | Kaulig Racing | Chevrolet | 32.773 | 164.770 |
| 5 | 19 | Brandon Jones | Joe Gibbs Racing | Toyota | 32.828 | 164.494 |
| 6 | 1 | Sam Mayer | JR Motorsports | Chevrolet | 32.855 | 164.359 |
| 7 | 2 | Sheldon Creed (R) | Richard Childress Racing | Chevrolet | 32.870 | 164.284 |
| 8 | 34 | Kyle Weatherman | Jesse Iwuji Motorsports | Chevrolet | 32.886 | 164.204 |
| 9 | 26 | Chandler Smith (i) | Sam Hunt Racing | Toyota | 32.905 | 164.109 |
| 10 | 21 | Austin Hill (R) | Richard Childress Racing | Chevrolet | 32.908 | 164.094 |
| 11 | 48 | Nick Sanchez | Big Machine Racing | Chevrolet | 32.920 | 164.034 |
| 12 | 8 | Josh Berry | JR Motorsports | Chevrolet | 32.931 | 163.979 |
| 13 | 16 | A. J. Allmendinger | Kaulig Racing | Chevrolet | 32.936 | 163.954 |
| 14 | 66 | J. J. Yeley | MBM Motorsports | Ford | 32.954 | 163.865 |
| 15 | 98 | Riley Herbst | Stewart-Haas Racing | Ford | 33.134 | 162.975 |
| 16 | 10 | Landon Cassill | Kaulig Racing | Chevrolet | 33.139 | 162.950 |
| 17 | 07 | Joe Graf Jr. | SS-Green Light Racing | Ford | 33.162 | 162.837 |
| 18 | 45 | Stefan Parsons (i) | Alpha Prime Racing | Chevrolet | 33.202 | 162.641 |
| 19 | 31 | Myatt Snider | Jordan Anderson Racing | Chevrolet | 33.203 | 162.636 |
| 20 | 7 | Justin Allgaier | JR Motorsports | Chevrolet | 33.351 | 161.914 |
| 21 | 27 | Jeb Burton | Our Motorsports | Chevrolet | 33.401 | 161.672 |
| 22 | 13 | Timmy Hill (i) | MBM Motorsports | Ford | 33.405 | 161.652 |
| 23 | 4 | Bayley Currey | JD Motorsports | Chevrolet | 33.424 | 161.561 |
| 24 | 6 | Brennan Poole (i) | JD Motorsports | Chevrolet | 33.457 | 161.401 |
| 25 | 39 | Ryan Sieg | RSS Racing | Ford | 33.484 | 161.271 |
| 26 | 51 | Jeremy Clements | Jeremy Clements Racing | Chevrolet | 33.548 | 160.963 |
| 27 | 78 | B. J. McLeod | B. J. McLeod Motorsports | Chevrolet | 33.551 | 160.949 |
| 28 | 91 | Mason Massey | DGM Racing | Chevrolet | 33.552 | 160.944 |
| 29 | 02 | Parker Retzlaff | Our Motorsports | Chevrolet | 33.600 | 160.714 |
| 30 | 35 | Patrick Emerling | Emerling-Gase Motorsports | Toyota | 33.611 | 160.662 |
| 31 | 08 | David Starr | SS-Green Light Racing | Ford | 33.624 | 160.600 |
| 32 | 36 | Josh Williams | DGM Racing | Chevrolet | 33.708 | 160.199 |
| 33 | 28 | Kyle Sieg | RSS Racing | Ford | 33.736 | 160.066 |
Qualified by owner's points
| 34 | 68 | Kris Wright | Brandonbilt Motorsports | Chevrolet | 33.764 | 159.934 |
| 35 | 23 | Anthony Alfredo | Our Motorsports | Chevrolet | 33.786 | 159.830 |
| 36 | 5 | Matt Mills (i) | B. J. McLeod Motorsports | Chevrolet | 33.838 | 159.584 |
| 37 | 44 | Julia Landauer | Alpha Prime Racing | Chevrolet | 34.038 | 158.646 |
| 38 | 38 | C. J. McLaughlin | RSS Racing | Ford | 34.312 | 157.379 |
Failed to qualify
| 39 | 92 | Alex Labbé | DGM Racing | Chevrolet | 34.062 | 158.534 |
| 40 | 77 | Dillon Bassett | Bassett Racing | Chevrolet | 34.106 | 158.330 |
Official qualifying results
Official starting lineup

== Race results ==
Stage 1 Laps: 40

| Pos. | # | Driver | Team | Make | Pts |
|---|---|---|---|---|---|
| 1 | 9 | Noah Gragson | JR Motorsports | Chevrolet | 10 |
| 2 | 10 | Landon Cassill | Kaulig Racing | Chevrolet | 9 |
| 3 | 54 | Ty Gibbs | Joe Gibbs Racing | Toyota | 8 |
| 4 | 18 | Trevor Bayne | Joe Gibbs Racing | Toyota | 7 |
| 5 | 16 | A. J. Allmendinger | Kaulig Racing | Chevrolet | 6 |
| 6 | 21 | Austin Hill (R) | Richard Childress Racing | Chevrolet | 5 |
| 7 | 11 | Daniel Hemric | Kaulig Racing | Chevrolet | 4 |
| 8 | 1 | Sam Mayer | JR Motorsports | Chevrolet | 3 |
| 9 | 34 | Kyle Weatherman | Jesse Iwuji Motorsports | Chevrolet | 2 |
| 10 | 7 | Justin Allgaier | JR Motorsports | Chevrolet | 1 |

Stage 2 Laps: 40

| Pos. | # | Driver | Team | Make | Pts |
|---|---|---|---|---|---|
| 1 | 9 | Noah Gragson | JR Motorsports | Chevrolet | 10 |
| 2 | 16 | A. J. Allmendinger | Kaulig Racing | Chevrolet | 9 |
| 3 | 21 | Austin Hill (R) | Richard Childress Racing | Chevrolet | 8 |
| 4 | 18 | Trevor Bayne | Joe Gibbs Racing | Toyota | 7 |
| 5 | 1 | Sam Mayer | JR Motorsports | Chevrolet | 6 |
| 6 | 54 | Ty Gibbs | Joe Gibbs Racing | Toyota | 5 |
| 7 | 10 | Landon Cassill | Kaulig Racing | Chevrolet | 4 |
| 8 | 11 | Daniel Hemric | Kaulig Racing | Chevrolet | 3 |
| 9 | 26 | Chandler Smith (i) | Sam Hunt Racing | Toyota | 0 |
| 10 | 45 | Stefan Parsons (i) | Alpha Prime Racing | Chevrolet | 0 |

Stage 3 Laps: 120

| Fin. | St | # | Driver | Team | Make | Laps | Led | Status | Pts |
|---|---|---|---|---|---|---|---|---|---|
| 1 | 2 | 9 | Noah Gragson | JR Motorsports | Chevrolet | 200 | 127 | Running | 60 |
| 2 | 3 | 54 | Ty Gibbs | Joe Gibbs Racing | Toyota | 200 | 1 | Running | 48 |
| 3 | 13 | 16 | A. J. Allmendinger | Kaulig Racing | Chevrolet | 200 | 1 | Running | 49 |
| 4 | 4 | 11 | Daniel Hemric | Kaulig Racing | Chevrolet | 200 | 0 | Running | 40 |
| 5 | 6 | 1 | Sam Mayer | JR Motorsports | Chevrolet | 200 | 0 | Running | 41 |
| 6 | 1 | 18 | Trevor Bayne | Joe Gibbs Racing | Toyota | 200 | 46 | Running | 45 |
| 7 | 9 | 26 | Chandler Smith (i) | Sam Hunt Racing | Toyota | 200 | 0 | Running | 0 |
| 8 | 15 | 98 | Riley Herbst | Stewart-Haas Racing | Ford | 200 | 0 | Running | 29 |
| 9 | 10 | 21 | Austin Hill (R) | Richard Childress Racing | Chevrolet | 200 | 19 | Running | 41 |
| 10 | 20 | 7 | Justin Allgaier | JR Motorsports | Chevrolet | 200 | 0 | Running | 28 |
| 11 | 12 | 8 | Josh Berry | JR Motorsports | Chevrolet | 200 | 3 | Running | 26 |
| 12 | 16 | 10 | Landon Cassill | Kaulig Racing | Chevrolet | 200 | 3 | Running | 38 |
| 13 | 23 | 4 | Bayley Currey | JD Motorsports | Chevrolet | 200 | 0 | Running | 24 |
| 14 | 24 | 6 | Brennan Poole (i) | JD Motorsports | Chevrolet | 200 | 0 | Running | 0 |
| 15 | 5 | 19 | Brandon Jones | Joe Gibbs Racing | Toyota | 199 | 0 | Running | 22 |
| 16 | 29 | 02 | Parker Retzlaff | Our Motorsports | Chevrolet | 199 | 0 | Running | 21 |
| 17 | 7 | 2 | Sheldon Creed (R) | Richard Childress Racing | Chevrolet | 199 | 0 | Running | 20 |
| 18 | 35 | 23 | Anthony Alfredo | Our Motorsports | Chevrolet | 199 | 0 | Running | 19 |
| 19 | 21 | 27 | Jeb Burton | Our Motorsports | Chevrolet | 199 | 0 | Running | 18 |
| 20 | 8 | 34 | Kyle Weatherman | Jesse Iwuji Motorsports | Chevrolet | 198 | 0 | Running | 19 |
| 21 | 31 | 08 | David Starr | SS-Green Light Racing | Ford | 198 | 0 | Running | 16 |
| 22 | 19 | 31 | Myatt Snider | Jordan Anderson Racing | Chevrolet | 198 | 0 | Running | 15 |
| 23 | 30 | 35 | Patrick Emerling | Emerling-Gase Motorsports | Toyota | 198 | 0 | Running | 14 |
| 24 | 17 | 07 | Joe Graf Jr. | SS-Green Light Racing | Ford | 198 | 0 | Running | 13 |
| 25 | 11 | 48 | Nick Sanchez | Big Machine Racing | Chevrolet | 198 | 0 | Running | 12 |
| 26 | 26 | 51 | Jeremy Clements | Jeremy Clements Racing | Chevrolet | 197 | 0 | Running | 11 |
| 27 | 34 | 68 | Kris Wright | Brandonbilt Motorsports | Chevrolet | 196 | 0 | Running | 10 |
| 28 | 37 | 44 | Julia Landauer | Alpha Prime Racing | Chevrolet | 196 | 0 | Running | 9 |
| 29 | 22 | 13 | Timmy Hill (i) | MBM Motorsports | Ford | 195 | 0 | Running | 0 |
| 30 | 32 | 36 | Josh Williams | DGM Racing | Chevrolet | 195 | 0 | Running | 7 |
| 31 | 38 | 38 | C. J. McLaughlin | RSS Racing | Ford | 195 | 0 | Running | 6 |
| 32 | 36 | 5 | Matt Mills (i) | B. J. McLeod Motorsports | Chevrolet | 195 | 0 | Running | 0 |
| 33 | 25 | 39 | Ryan Sieg | RSS Racing | Ford | 190 | 0 | Running | 4 |
| 34 | 18 | 45 | Stefan Parsons (i) | Alpha Prime Racing | Chevrolet | 189 | 0 | Accident | 0 |
| 35 | 33 | 28 | Kyle Sieg | RSS Racing | Ford | 183 | 0 | Accident | 2 |
| 36 | 27 | 78 | B. J. McLeod | B. J. McLeod Motorsports | Chevrolet | 115 | 0 | Electrical | 1 |
| 37 | 28 | 91 | Mason Massey | DGM Racing | Chevrolet | 62 | 0 | Engine | 1 |
| 38 | 14 | 66 | J. J. Yeley | MBM Motorsports | Ford | 3 | 0 | Accident | 1 |
Official race results

== Standings after the race ==
Drivers' Championship standings

| | Pos | Driver | Points |
|---|---|---|---|
| | 1 | Noah Gragson | 3,169 |
| | 2 | Ty Gibbs | 3,138 (-31) |
| 3 | 3 | A. J. Allmendinger | 3,113 (-56) |
| 1 | 4 | Justin Allgaier | 3,108 (-61) |
| | 5 | Austin Hill | 3,106 (-63) |
| 2 | 6 | Josh Berry | 3,095 (-74) |
| 1 | 7 | Sam Mayer | 3,085 (-84) |
| 1 | 8 | Brandon Jones | 3,075 (-94) |
| | 9 | Daniel Hemric | 2,162 (-1,007) |
| | 10 | Riley Herbst | 2,128 (-1,041) |
| | 11 | Ryan Sieg | 2,103 (-1,066) |
| | 12 | Jeremy Clements | 2,039 (-1,130) |
Official driver's standings

- Note: Only the first 12 positions are included for the driver standings.

| Previous race: 2022 Alsco Uniforms 302 | NASCAR Xfinity Series; 2022 season | Next race: 2022 Dead On Tools 250 |
