= 2022 Alsco Uniforms 302 =

30th race of the 2022 NASCAR Xfinity Series

Race details
- Race 30 of 33 of the 2022 NASCAR Xfinity Series
- Date: October 15, 2022
- Official name: 5th Annual Alsco Uniforms 302
- Location: Las Vegas Motor Speedway, North Las Vegas, Nevada
- Course: Permanent racing facility
- Course length: 1.5 miles (2.4 km)
- Distance: 201 laps, 301.5 mi (485.22 km)
- Scheduled distance: 201 laps, 301.5 mi (485.22 km)
- Average speed: 145.613 mph (234.341 km/h)

Pole position
Driver	A. J. Allmendinger	Kaulig Racing
- Time: 29.716

Most laps led
Driver	Noah Gragson	JR Motorsports
- Laps: 87

Winner
No. 8	Josh Berry	JR Motorsports

Television in the United States
- Network: NBC
- Announcers: Rick Allen, Jeff Burton, Dale Earnhardt Jr. and Steve Letarte

Radio in the United States
- Radio: Performance Racing Network

The 2022 Alsco Uniforms 302 was the 30th stock car race of the 2022 NASCAR Xfinity Series, the first race of the Round of 8, and the 5th iteration of the event. The race was held on Saturday, October 15, 2022, in North Las Vegas, Nevada at Las Vegas Motor Speedway, a 1.5 miles (2.4 km) permanent tri-oval shaped racetrack. The race took the scheduled 201 laps to complete. Josh Berry, driving for JR Motorsports, held off Noah Gragson and Justin Allgaier in the final few laps, and earned his fourth career NASCAR Xfinity Series win, along with his second of the season. He would also earn a spot in the championship 4. Gragson mainly dominated the race, leading 87 laps.

This was the debut race for Truck Series driver, Hailie Deegan. Deegan would start the race in 20th, and would finish in 13th, making her the highest finishing female driver in their first Xfinity Series start.

== Background ==
Las Vegas Motor Speedway, located in Clark County, Nevada in Las Vegas, Nevada about 15 miles northeast of the Las Vegas Strip, is a 1,200-acre (490 ha) complex of multiple tracks for motorsports racing. The complex is owned by Speedway Motorsports, Inc., which is headquartered in Charlotte, North Carolina.

=== Entry list ===
- (R) denotes rookie driver.
- (i) denotes driver who are ineligible for series driver points.

#	Driver	Team	Make
1	Sam Mayer	JR Motorsports	Chevrolet
02	Parker Retzlaff	Our Motorsports	Chevrolet
2	Sheldon Creed (R)	Richard Childress Racing	Chevrolet
4	Bayley Currey	JD Motorsports	Chevrolet
5	Matt Mills	B. J. McLeod Motorsports	Chevrolet
6	Ryan Vargas	JD Motorsports	Chevrolet
07	Hailie Deegan (i)	SS-Green Light Racing	Ford
7	Justin Allgaier	JR Motorsports	Chevrolet
08	David Starr	SS-Green Light Racing	Ford
8	Josh Berry	JR Motorsports	Chevrolet
9	Noah Gragson	JR Motorsports	Chevrolet
10	Landon Cassill	Kaulig Racing	Chevrolet
11	Daniel Hemric	Kaulig Racing	Chevrolet
13	Matt Jaskol (i)	MBM Motorsports	Toyota
16	A. J. Allmendinger	Kaulig Racing	Chevrolet
18	Trevor Bayne	Joe Gibbs Racing	Toyota
19	Brandon Jones	Joe Gibbs Racing	Toyota
21	Austin Hill (R)	Richard Childress Racing	Chevrolet
23	Anthony Alfredo	Our Motorsports	Chevrolet
26	John Hunter Nemechek (i)	Sam Hunt Racing	Toyota
27	Jeb Burton	Our Motorsports	Chevrolet
28	Kyle Sieg (R)	RSS Racing	Ford
31	Myatt Snider	Jordan Anderson Racing	Chevrolet
34	Kyle Weatherman	Jesse Iwuji Motorsports	Chevrolet
35	Jeffrey Earnhardt	Emerling-Gase Motorsports	Toyota
36	Josh Williams	DGM Racing	Chevrolet
38	C. J. McLaughlin	RSS Racing	Ford
39	Ryan Sieg	RSS Racing	Ford
44	Rajah Caruth (i)	Alpha Prime Racing	Chevrolet
45	Stefan Parsons (i)	Alpha Prime Racing	Chevrolet
48	Nick Sanchez	Big Machine Racing	Chevrolet
51	Jeremy Clements	Jeremy Clements Racing	Chevrolet
54	Ty Gibbs	Joe Gibbs Racing	Toyota
66	J. J. Yeley	MBM Motorsports	Toyota
68	Kris Wright	Brandonbilt Motorsports	Chevrolet
78	Garrett Smithley	B. J. McLeod Motorsports	Chevrolet
91	Mason Massey	DGM Racing	Chevrolet
98	Riley Herbst	Stewart-Haas Racing	Ford
Official entry list

== Practice ==
The only 20-minute practice session was held on Friday, October 14, at 5:35 PM PST. Ty Gibbs, driving for Joe Gibbs Racing, would set the fastest time in the session, with a lap of 30.527, and an average speed of 176.893 mph (284.682 km/h).

Pos.	#	Driver	Team	Make	Time	Speed
1	54	Ty Gibbs	Joe Gibbs Racing	Toyota	30.527	176.893
2	18	Trevor Bayne	Joe Gibbs Racing	Toyota	30.592	176.517
3	26	John Hunter Nemechek (i)	Sam Hunt Racing	Toyota	30.623	176.338
Full practice results

== Qualifying ==
Qualifying was held on Friday, October 14, at 6:05 PM PST. Since Las Vegas Motor Speedway is a tri-oval track, the qualifying system used is a single-car, one-lap system with only one round. Whoever sets the fastest time in the round wins the pole. A. J. Allmendinger, driving for Kaulig Racing, would score the pole for the race, with a lap of 29.716, and an average speed of 181.720 mph (292.450 km/h).

Pos.	#	Driver	Team	Make	Time	Speed
1	16	A. J. Allmendinger	Kaulig Racing	Chevrolet	29.716	181.720
2	18	Trevor Bayne	Joe Gibbs Racing	Toyota	29.729	181.641
3	54	Ty Gibbs	Joe Gibbs Racing	Toyota	29.800	181.208
4	9	Noah Gragson	JR Motorsports	Chevrolet	29.915	180.511
5	1	Sam Mayer	JR Motorsports	Chevrolet	29.921	180.475
6	11	Daniel Hemric	Kaulig Racing	Chevrolet	30.028	179.832
7	19	Brandon Jones	Joe Gibbs Racing	Toyota	30.035	179.790
8	21	Austin Hill (R)	Richard Childress Racing	Chevrolet	30.113	179.325
9	2	Sheldon Creed (R)	Richard Childress Racing	Chevrolet	30.130	179.223
10	7	Justin Allgaier	JR Motorsports	Chevrolet	30.156	179.069
11	26	John Hunter Nemechek (i)	Sam Hunt Racing	Toyota	30.169	178.992
12	8	Josh Berry	JR Motorsports	Chevrolet	30.279	178.341
13	39	Ryan Sieg	RSS Racing	Chevrolet	30.283	178.318
14	51	Jeremy Clements	Jeremy Clements Racing	Chevrolet	30.321	178.094
15	10	Landon Cassill	Kaulig Racing	Chevrolet	30.443	177.381
16	27	Jeb Burton	Our Motorsports	Chevrolet	30.450	177.340
17	45	Stefan Parsons (i)	Alpha Prime Racing	Chevrolet	30.450	177.340
18	44	Rajah Caruth (i)	Alpha Prime Racing	Chevrolet	30.492	177.096
19	66	J. J. Yeley	MBM Motorsports	Toyota	30.592	176.517
20	07	Hailie Deegan (i)	SS-Green Light Racing	Ford	30.656	176.148
21	23	Anthony Alfredo	Our Motorsports	Chevrolet	30.704	175.873
22	48	Nick Sanchez	Big Machine Racing	Chevrolet	30.792	175.370
23	31	Myatt Snider	Jordan Anderson Racing	Chevrolet	30.886	174.836
24	4	Bayley Currey	JD Motorsports	Chevrolet	30.921	174.639
25	78	Garrett Smithley	B. J. McLeod Motorsports	Chevrolet	30.966	174.385
26	34	Kyle Weatherman	Jesse Iwuji Motorsports	Chevrolet	31.074	173.779
27	02	Parker Retzlaff	Our Motorsports	Chevrolet	31.169	173.249
28	36	Josh Williams	DGM Racing	Chevrolet	31.237	172.872
29	91	Mason Massey	DGM Racing	Chevrolet	31.265	172.717
30	13	Matt Jaskol (i)	MBM Motorsports	Toyota	31.445	171.728
31	68	Kris Wright	Brandonbilt Motorsports	Chevrolet	31.469	171.597
32	35	Jeffrey Earnhardt	Emerling-Gase Motorsports	Toyota	31.628	170.735
33	5	Matt Mills	B. J. McLeod Motorsports	Chevrolet	31.700	170.347
Qualified by owner's points
34	38	C. J. McLaughlin	RSS Racing	Ford	31.854	169.523
35	6	Ryan Vargas	JD Motorsports	Chevrolet	32.191	167.749
36	98	Riley Herbst	Stewart-Haas Racing	Ford	-	-
37	08	David Starr	SS-Green Light Racing	Ford	-	-
38	28	Kyle Sieg	RSS Racing	Ford	-	-
Official qualifying results
Official starting lineup

== Race results ==
Stage 1 Laps: 45

Pos.	#	Driver	Team	Make	Pts
1	54	Ty Gibbs	Joe Gibbs Racing	Toyota	10
2	21	Austin Hill (R)	Richard Childress Racing	Chevrolet	9
3	9	Noah Gragson	JR Motorsports	Chevrolet	8
4	7	Justin Allgaier	JR Motorsports	Chevrolet	7
5	19	Brandon Jones	Joe Gibbs Racing	Toyota	6
6	1	Sam Mayer	JR Motorsports	Chevrolet	5
7	16	A. J. Allmendinger	Kaulig Racing	Chevrolet	4
8	26	John Hunter Nemechek (i)	Sam Hunt Racing	Toyota	0
9	8	Josh Berry	JR Motorsports	Chevrolet	2
10	11	Daniel Hemric	Kaulig Racing	Chevrolet	1

Stage 2 Laps: 45

Pos.	#	Driver	Team	Make	Pts
1	9	Noah Gragson	JR Motorsports	Chevrolet	10
2	54	Ty Gibbs	Joe Gibbs Racing	Toyota	9
3	19	Brandon Jones	Joe Gibbs Racing	Toyota	8
4	21	Austin Hill (R)	Richard Childress Racing	Chevrolet	7
5	7	Justin Allgaier	JR Motorsports	Chevrolet	6
6	8	Josh Berry	JR Motorsports	Chevrolet	5
7	1	Sam Mayer	JR Motorsports	Chevrolet	4
8	11	Daniel Hemric	Kaulig Racing	Chevrolet	3
9	18	Trevor Bayne	Joe Gibbs Racing	Toyota	2
10	16	A. J. Allmendinger	Kaulig Racing	Chevrolet	1

Stage 3 Laps: 111

Fin.	St	#	Driver	Team	Make	Laps	Led	Status	Pts
1	12	8	Josh Berry	JR Motorsports	Chevrolet	201	65	Running	47
2	4	9	Noah Gragson	JR Motorsports	Chevrolet	201	87	Running	53
3	10	7	Justin Allgaier	JR Motorsports	Chevrolet	201	0	Running	47
4	3	54	Ty Gibbs	Joe Gibbs Racing	Toyota	201	30	Running	52
5	2	18	Trevor Bayne	Joe Gibbs Racing	Toyota	201	0	Running	34
6	8	21	Austin Hill (R)	Richard Childress Racing	Chevrolet	201	2	Running	47
7	5	1	Sam Mayer	JR Motorsports	Chevrolet	201	0	Running	39
8	6	11	Daniel Hemric	Kaulig Racing	Chevrolet	201	0	Running	33
9	7	19	Brandon Jones	Joe Gibbs Racing	Toyota	201	5	Running	42
10	21	23	Anthony Alfredo	Our Motorsports	Chevrolet	201	0	Running	27
11	15	10	Landon Cassill	Kaulig Racing	Chevrolet	201	3	Running	26
12	22	48	Nick Sanchez	Big Machine Racing	Chevrolet	201	1	Running	25
13	20	07	Hailie Deegan (i)	SS-Green Light Racing	Ford	201	0	Running	0
14	26	34	Kyle Weatherman	Jesse Iwuji Motorsports	Chevrolet	201	1	Running	23
15	14	51	Jeremy Clements	Jeremy Clements Racing	Chevrolet	201	0	Running	22
16	11	26	John Hunter Nemechek (i)	Sam Hunt Racing	Toyota	200	0	Running	0
17	16	27	Jeb Burton	Our Motorsports	Chevrolet	200	0	Running	20
18	36	98	Riley Herbst	Stewart-Haas Racing	Ford	200	0	Running	19
19	23	31	Myatt Snider	Jordan Anderson Racing	Chevrolet	200	0	Running	18
20	18	44	Rajah Caruth (i)	Alpha Prime Racing	Chevrolet	200	0	Running	0
21	27	02	Parker Retzlaff	Our Motorsports	Chevrolet	199	0	Running	16
22	1	16	A. J. Allmendinger	Kaulig Racing	Chevrolet	199	7	Running	20
23	17	45	Stefan Parsons (i)	Alpha Prime Racing	Chevrolet	198	0	Running	0
24	31	68	Kris Wright	Brandonbilt Motorsports	Chevrolet	197	0	Running	13
25	25	78	Garrett Smithley	B. J. McLeod Motorsports	Chevrolet	197	0	Running	12
26	38	28	Kyle Sieg	RSS Racing	Ford	197	0	Running	11
27	32	35	Jeffrey Earnhardt	Emerling-Gase Motorsports	Toyota	197	0	Running	10
28	35	6	Ryan Vargas	JD Motorsports	Chevrolet	197	0	Running	9
29	29	91	Mason Massey	DGM Racing	Chevrolet	196	0	Running	8
30	34	38	C. J. McLaughlin	RSS Racing	Ford	196	0	Running	7
31	37	08	David Starr	SS-Green Light Racing	Ford	196	0	Running	6
32	30	13	Matt Jaskol (i)	MBM Motorsports	Toyota	195	0	Running	0
33	24	4	Bayley Currey	JD Motorsports	Chevrolet	195	0	Running	4
34	28	36	Josh Williams	DGM Racing	Chevrolet	195	0	Running	3
35	33	5	Matt Mills (i)	B. J. McLeod Motorsports	Chevrolet	195	0	Running	0
36	19	66	J. J. Yeley	MBM Motorsports	Toyota	82	0	Engine	1
37	9	2	Sheldon Creed (R)	Richard Childress Racing	Chevrolet	52	0	Engine	1
38	13	39	Ryan Sieg	RSS Racing	Ford	32	0	Steering	1
Official race results

== Standings after the race ==
Drivers' Championship standings

	Pos	Driver	Points
	1	Noah Gragson	3,109
1	2	Ty Gibbs	3,090 (-19)
1	3	Justin Allgaier	3,080 (-29)
1	4	Josh Berry	3,069 (-40)
1	5	Austin Hill	3,065 (-44)
4	6	A. J. Allmendinger	3,064 (-45)
	7	Brandon Jones	3,053 (-56)
	8	Sam Mayer	3,044 (-65)
1	9	Daniel Hemric	2,122 (-987)
1	10	Riley Herbst	2,099 (-1,010)
1	11	Ryan Sieg	2,099 (-1,010)
	12	Jeremy Clements	2,068 (-1,041)
Official driver's standings

- Note: Only the first 12 positions are included for the driver standings.

Previous race: 2022 Drive for the Cure 250	NASCAR Xfinity Series; 2022 season	Next race: 2022 Contender Boats 300
