= Jesse Iwuji =

American football player and racing driver (born 1987)

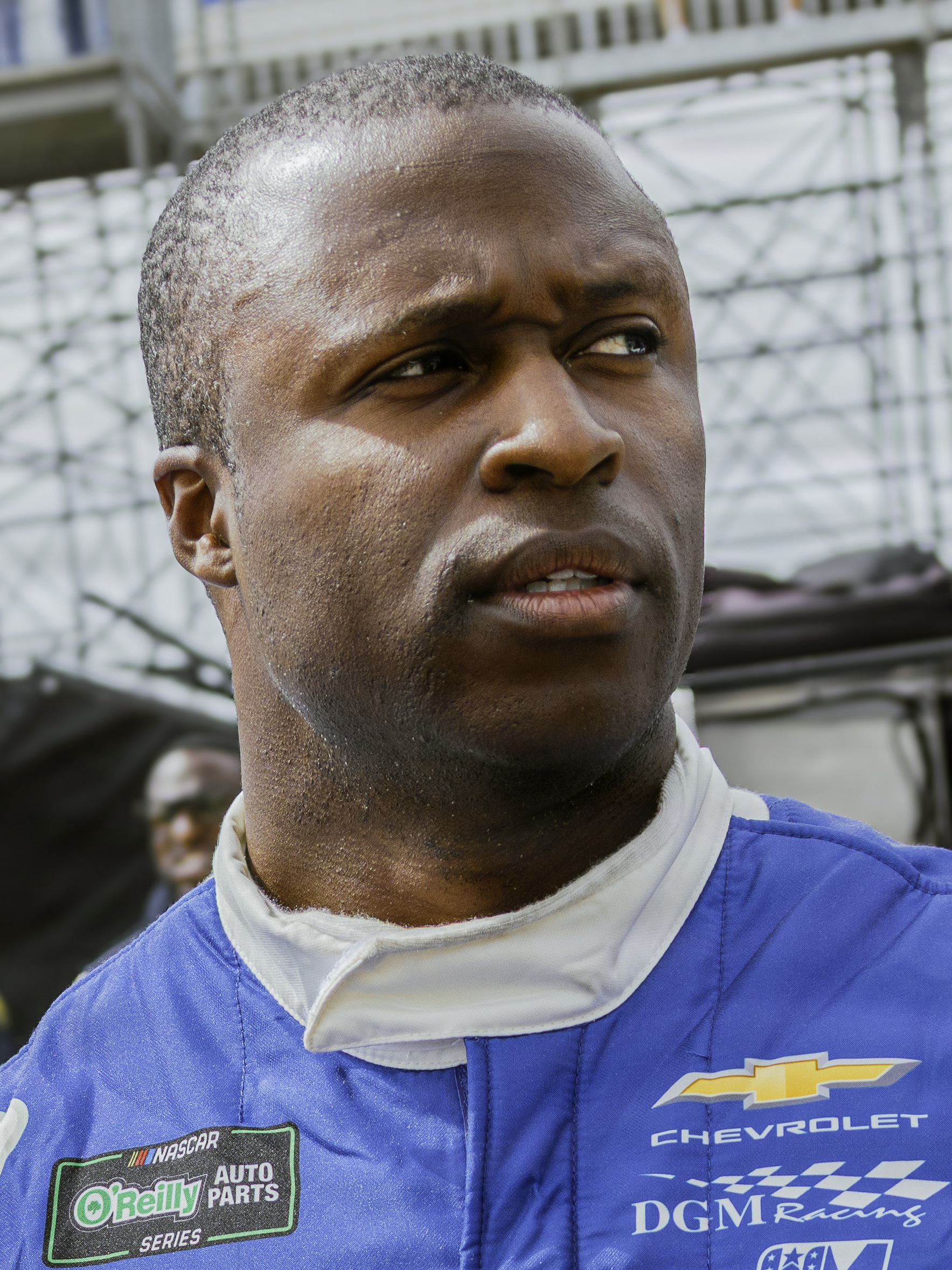
- Iwuji at Naval Base Coronado in 2026
- Born: Jesse Ekene Iwuji; August 12, 1987 (age 39); Carrollton, Texas, U.S.
- Military career
- Allegiance: United States of America
- Branch: Navy
- Service years: 2010–present
- Rank: Commander
- Football career

No. 3
- Position: Free safety

Personal information
- Listed height: 6 ft 1 in (1.85 m)
- Listed weight: 182 lb (83 kg)

Career information
- High school: Hebron (Texas)
- College: Navy (2005–2009)

NASCAR O'Reilly Auto Parts Series career
- 19 races run over 6 years
- 2026 position: 54th
- Best finish: 43rd (2022)
- First race: 2020 Henry 180 (Road America)
- Last race: 2026 United Rentals Driven to Serve 250 (San Diego)
Wins	Top tens	Poles
0	0	0

NASCAR FedEx Freight Truck Series career
- 16 races run over 5 years
- 2022 position: 105th
- Best finish: 39th (2019)
- First race: 2018 Chevrolet Silverado 250 (Mosport)
- Last race: 2022 Heart of America 200 (Kansas)
Wins	Top tens	Poles
0	0	0

ARCA Menards Series career
- 6 races run over 1 year
- Best finish: 33rd (2018)
- First race: 2018 Lucas Oil 200 (Daytona)
- Last race: 2018 Scott 150 (Chicagoland)
Wins	Top tens	Poles
0	0	0

ARCA Menards Series East career
- 4 races run over 2 years
- Best finish: 29th (2017)
- First race: 2017 Jet Tools 150 (New Smyrna)
- Last race: 2018 Zombie Auto 150 (Bristol)
Wins	Top tens	Poles
0	0	0

ARCA Menards Series West career
- 35 races run over 4 years
- Best finish: 10th (2016)
- First race: 2015 NAPA Auto Parts 150 (Evergreen)
- Last race: 2018 Casey's General Store 150 (Iowa)
Wins	Top tens	Poles
0	1	0
- Statistics up to date as of November 7, 2026.
- Website: www.jesseiwuji.com

Jesse Ekene Iwuji // (/iˈwuːdʒi/ ee-WOO-jee; born August 12, 1987) is an American professional stock car racing driver and officer in the United States Navy Reserve. He last competed part-time in the NASCAR O'Reilly Auto Parts Series, driving the No. 91 Chevrolet Camaro SS for DGM Racing with Jesse Iwuji Motorsports. He has also competed in the NASCAR Camping World Truck Series, NASCAR K&N Pro Series East, West, and ARCA Racing Series in the past.

Iwuji attended the United States Naval Academy, where he joined the school's college football and track and field teams; on the former, he was a free safety for the Navy Midshipmen. He graduated from the academy in 2010 and entered the United States Navy as a surface warfare officer, in which he served on the Mine Countermeasures ship Exultant and USS Comstock. After seven years on active duty, Iwuji transitioned to the Navy Reserve.

As a sailor and driver, Iwuji has served as an ambassador for both the military and NASCAR communities. In addition to supporting military philanthropic groups, he is also involved in various NASCAR events supporting the armed forces and veterans.

== Early life and military career ==
Iwuji attended Hebron High School, where he was a letterman twice in football and three times in track. On the football team, he was a two-star recruit. During his junior year of high school, Iwuji was contacted by the Naval Academy and was offered a scholarship to the school. In addition to continuing his football career at Hebron (where he was named first-team all-district in his senior year), he attended the Naval Academy Preparatory School before heading to the Naval Academy. He formally enrolled at the Academy on June 30, 2005.

Although he played linebacker in high school, Iwuji was a free safety on the Navy football team. He played on special teams during his freshman year in 2006 before starting two games at safety in 2007, but missed six games during the latter due to ankle injury. In 2008, he played in the Army–Navy Game and the EagleBank Bowl. Iwuji was a backup to Kwesi Mitchell in 2009, though he saw action at strong safety in the season opener against the Ohio State Buckeyes due to Emmett Merchant's injury. Iwuji also competed on the track and field team, where he ran the 60-meter, 100-meter, and 200-meter dashes in addition to the 4 × 100-meter relay.

Iwuji graduated in 2010 with a Bachelor of Science degree and became a surface warfare officer. After working as a football coach at the Naval Academy Preparatory School, he entered active service. Iwuji worked in mine countermeasures with Mine Countermeasures Crew Exultant and was deployed to Bahrain in 2012. He was later deployed on the USS Comstock, a ship whose name would later appear on a NASCAR Xfinity Series car when it was featured on Bubba Wallace's No. 6 Ford Mustang in 2016. In May 2017, he moved to the Navy Reserve. Iwuji was promoted from lieutenant commander to commander in June 2025.

Iwuji is stationed in Ventura, California.

== Racing career ==
=== Early career ===
While attending the Naval Academy, Iwuji first expressed interest in motorsports when the Midshipmen visited the Lowe's Motor Speedway in Charlotte, North Carolina before the 2006 Meineke Car Care Bowl, during which the players rode around the track. During his senior year, he started drag racing at Capitol Speedway in Crofton, Maryland, driving a Chrysler 300. After his graduation, he raced a Dodge Challenger. Four years later, he participated in the Mojave Mile speed trial; for the event, he upgraded his Challenger's engine to a horsepower of 1,100. With the new engine, Iwuji ran at a speed of 200.9 miles per hour (323.3 km/h), becoming the fifth modern Mopar driver to accomplish the feat at the Mojave Mile. Afterwards, he joined the Naval Postgraduate School staff in southern California, where he was involved in road racing – driving a Chevrolet Corvette – before making the transition to stock cars.

=== NASCAR and ARCA ===
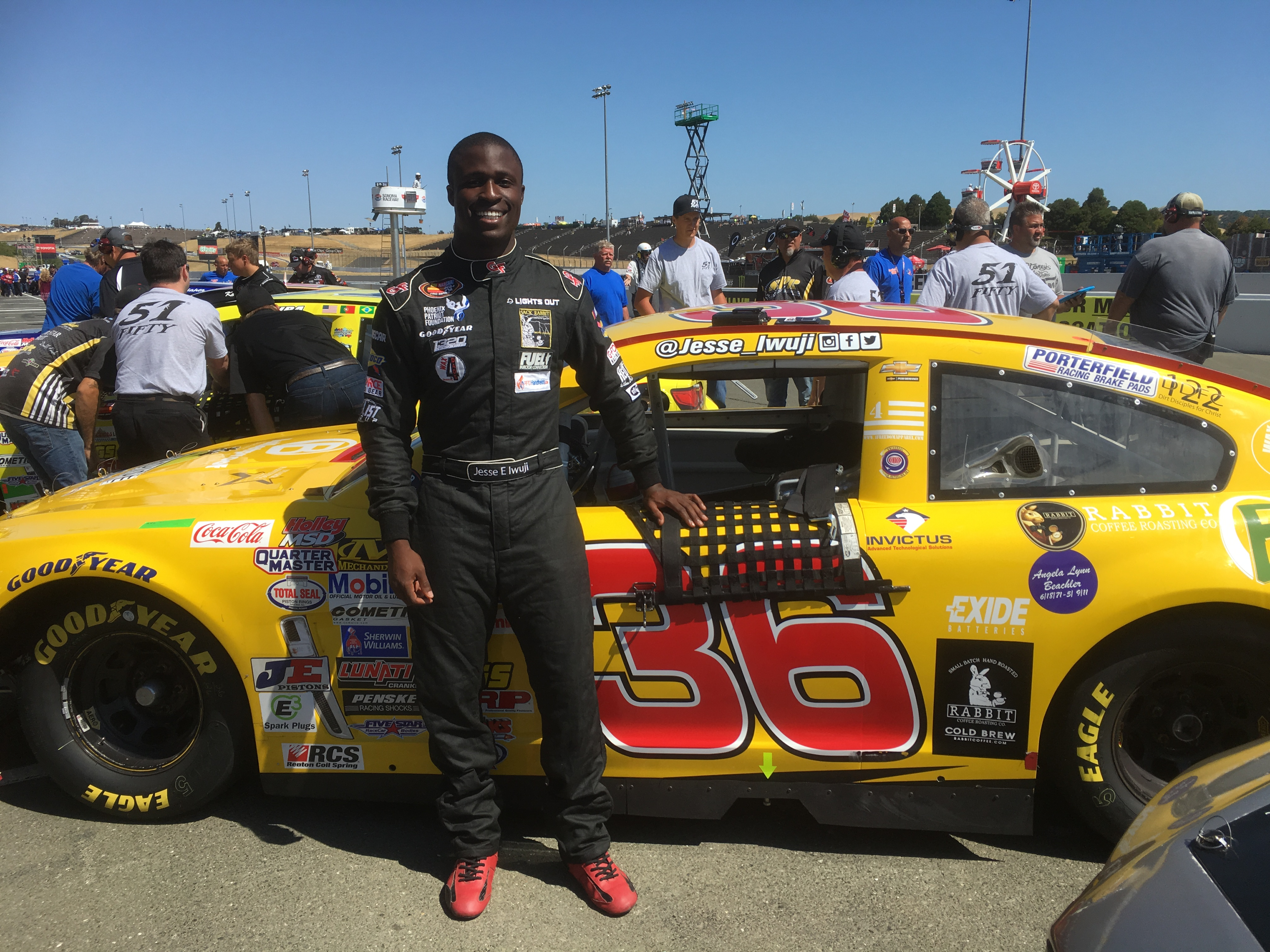
Iwuji standing beside his No. 36 car before the West Series race at Sonoma in 2017

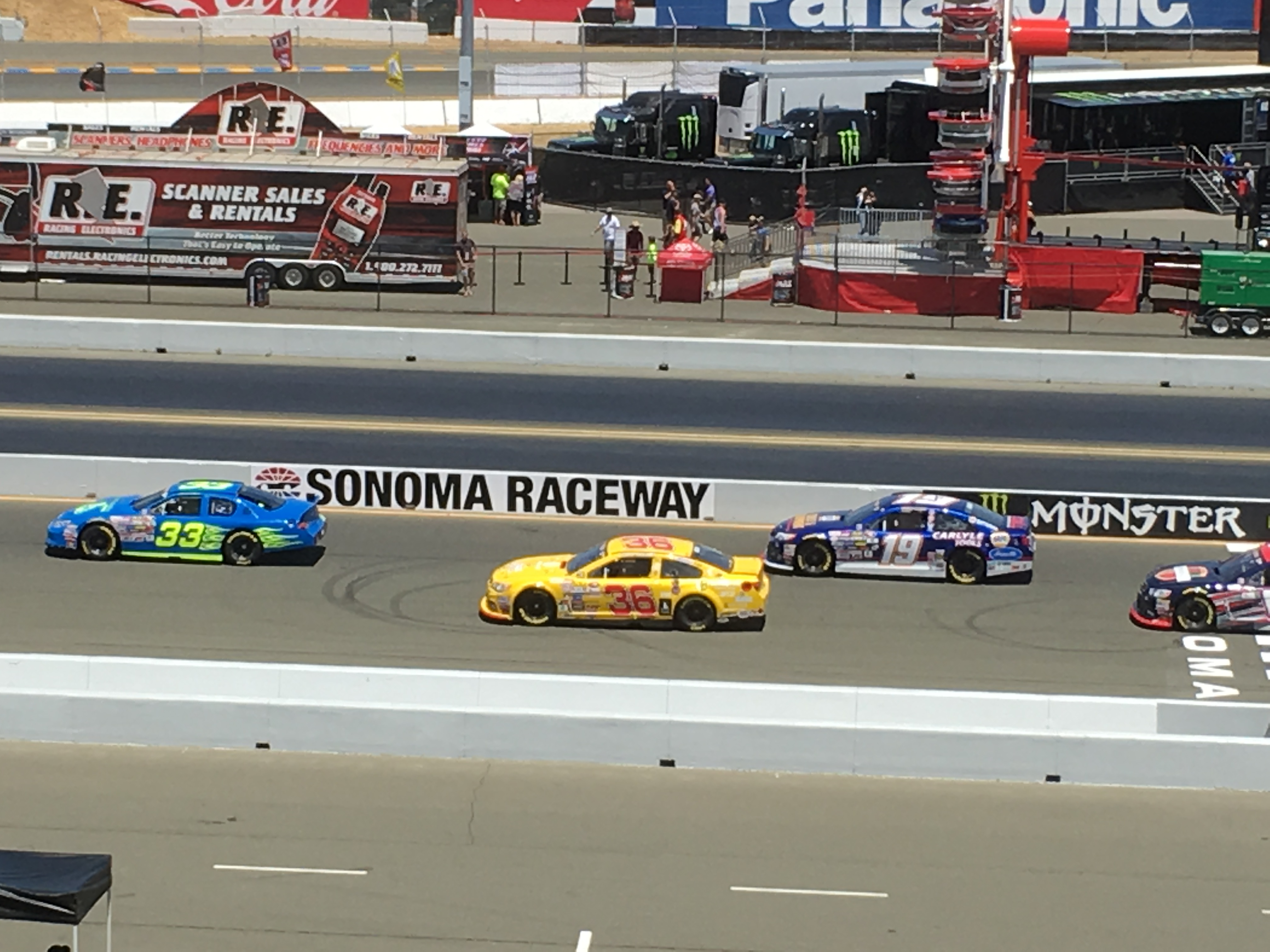
Iwuji (No. 36) racing Nicole Behar (No. 33) and Derek Kraus (No. 19) at Sonoma in 2017

In 2014, Iwuji tested a stock car for Performance P-1 Motorsports at Irwindale Speedway. A year later, he began racing for the team after returning from deployment in the Persian Gulf. He first competed in the Whelen All-American Series, finishing fifteenth in his debut. He also made two NASCAR K&N Pro Series West starts that year at Evergreen Speedway, but did not start the race. He later ran the race at Meridian Speedway, finishing 23rd after a crash. In the winter, he ran 34 dirt track races, one of which included a fifth-place finish in a Winged 500cc Outlaw Kart A-main.

Iwuji started competing full-time in the K&N Pro Series West in 2016, driving the No. 36 for Patriot Motorsports Group. That year, he was named to the "Mighty 25: Veterans poised for impact in 2016" list by military website We Are The Mighty. He recorded a best finish of tenth at Orange Show Speedway. At the Utah Motorsports Campus race, he earned the Move of the Race Award, which is given to the driver who gains the most positions in a race. During the year, he also competed in the NAPA Big 5 Late Model Series at Meridian Speedway. Iwuji battled with Todd Gilliland and Salvatore Iovino for the K&N Pro Series West's 2016 Most Popular Driver Award, but lost to Iovino. He finished the season tenth in the final point standings and sixth the rookie standings. In February 2017, Iwuji was awarded the NASCAR Diverse Driver Award, which is given to a minority/female driver who "exemplifies outstanding performance both on and off the race track in encouraging awareness and interaction with NASCAR and motorsports".

Prior to the 2017 season, Iwuji became Patriot Motorsports Group's primary owner, while former National Football League linebacker Shawne Merriman partnered with the team to serve as owner of the No. 36 car. The two met during a fashion show in Los Angeles promoting Merriman's new clothing line; Merriman, a longtime motorsports fan, agreed to join PMG. Over the course of the season, Iwuji continued to race Outlaw Karts to develop his racing ability on both dirt and asphalt. In February, he ran his first NASCAR K&N Pro Series East race in the season opener at New Smyrna Speedway, in which he finished 21st.

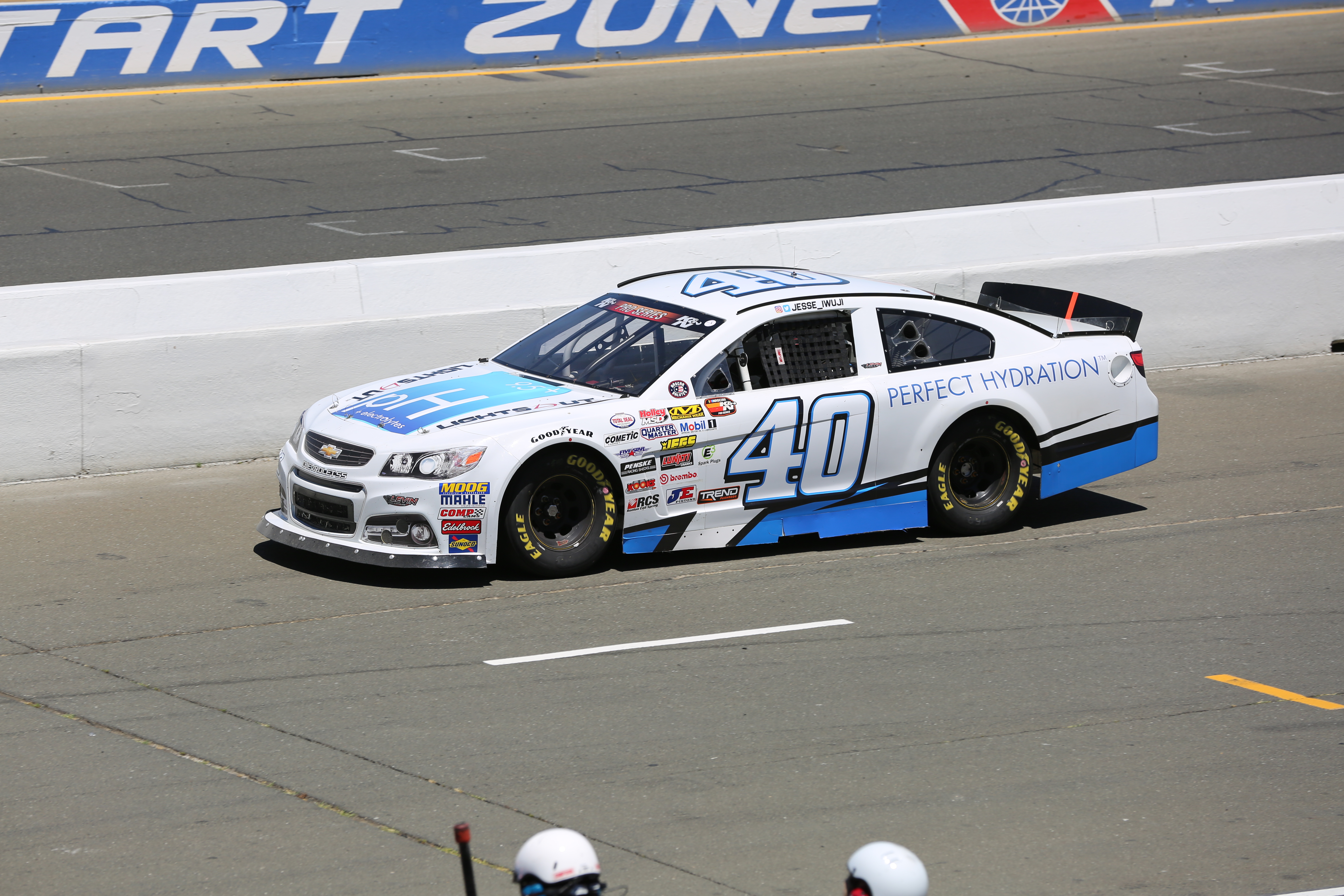
Iwuji's No. 40 car at Sonoma in 2018

In February 2018, Iwuji tested an ARCA Racing Series car for PMG at Daytona International Speedway in preparation for his series debut in the Lucas Oil 200. For the 2018 season, he intends to focus on competing in ARCA, particularly the larger tracks, in addition to running sporadic K&N East and West races. In August, Reaume Brothers Racing announced Iwuji would make his NASCAR Camping World Truck Series debut at Canadian Tire Motorsports Park in the team's No. 34 Chevrolet Silverado. After starting 31st, he finished 25th.

Iwuji returned to Reaume Brothers Racing and the Truck Series in 2019, driving the No. 34 at Las Vegas Motor Speedway. He returned to the Reaume team and the Truck Series for the third year in a row in 2020. He made starts at Charlotte Motor Speedway and Pocono Raceway, finishing 39th and 28th, respectively, both of which came in the team's No. 33.

In August 2020, Iwuji made his NASCAR Xfinity Series debut in the MBM Motorsports No. 13 Toyota at Road America. Later in the year, he joined B. J. McLeod Motorsports for three of the final four Xfinity races of the season.

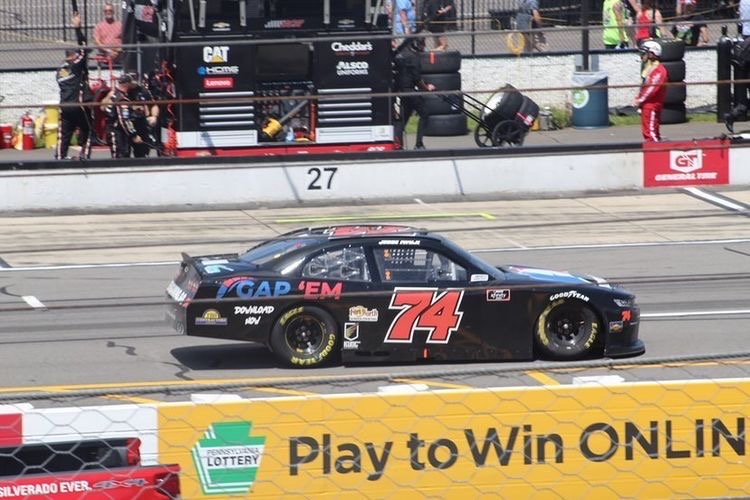
Iwuji driving the No. 74 Chevrolet for Mike Harmon Racing

Iwuji returned to RBR in 2021 for his fourth part-time season with the team. Driving the No. 34, he attempted to qualify for the season-opener at Daytona for the first time but failed to make the race. He then drove the No. 33 at Las Vegas. Iwuji would manage to get a one-off Xfinity start driving the No. 74 car from Mike Harmon Racing, after the driver for the No. 74, Bayley Currey, had to be replaced unexpectedly. Mike Harmon Racing would put out a statement on social media, saying "This decision was made as a TEAM in which Bayley FULLY supports. He is still the primary driver for the 74, we have no intentions of changing that, he is a huge part of this team." With sponsorship from racing app Gap 'Em, Iwuji would be able to wheel the car into a 31st-place finish.

In August 2021, Iwuji announced that he was partnering with Pro Football Hall of Famer Emmitt Smith to start an Xfinity Series team for the 2022 season, Jesse Iwuji Motorsports.

== Personal life ==
Iwuji is of Igbo descent, an ethnic group of people in Nigeria. His parents, Sebastian and Enderline, immigrated to the United States in the 1980s. Enderline was a track runner in Nigeria, while daughter Emenderlyn ran track for Arkansas State. Like Iwuji, younger brothers Justin and Bryan played football, though at Texas State as a safety and linebacker, respectively; Justin had also been recruited to play quarterback for the Naval Academy Preparatory School before electing to attend Texas State. While Iwuji and his siblings are born in the United States, they hold Nigerian citizenship. As of 2017, Iwuji is one of three African-American drivers actively competing in a NASCAR series along with Wallace and Pro Series East driver Jay Beasley.

Iwuji is involved in various philanthropic and military-related activities. Iwuji is the racing ambassador for the Phoenix Patriot Foundation, a group formed after the September 11 attacks to support wounded soldiers. "We dedicate each race weekend to a wounded veteran and his family," Iwuji stated. "The effort has been widely supported by race officials and others. It's an opportunity for everyone to give back to the people who've made a sacrifice on their behalf." In March 2016, he drove Darrian Nordstrom, a four-year-old boy with terminal cancer, in a two-seat stock car. In May, he served as a host for a veteran's family prior to the Coca-Cola 600; as part of the NASCAR Salutes program, which honors United States military personnel, he was a guest co-host of NASCAR.com's GarageCam series.

== Motorsports career results ==
=== NASCAR ===
(key) (Bold – Pole position awarded by qualifying time. Italics – Pole position earned by points standings or practice time. * – Most laps led.)

==== O'Reilly Auto Parts Series ====
NASCAR O'Reilly Auto Parts Series results
Year	Team	No.	Make	1	2	3	4	5	6	7	8	9	10	11	12	13	14	15	16	17	18	19	20	21	22	23	24	25	26	27	28	29	30	31	32	33	NXSC	Pts	Ref
2020	MBM Motorsports	13	Toyota	DAY	LVS	CAL	PHO	DAR	CLT	BRI	ATL	HOM	HOM	TAL	POC	IRC	KEN	KEN	TEX	KAN	ROA; 26	DRC	DOV	DOV	DAY	DAR	RCH	RCH	BRI	LVS	TAL	ROV					84th	0^{1}	
2020	B. J. McLeod Motorsports	99	Chevy																														KAN; 27	TEX; 23	MAR	PHO; 30	84th	0^{1}	
2021	Mike Harmon Racing	74	Chevy	DAY	DRC	HOM	LVS	PHO	ATL	MAR	TAL	DAR	DOV	COA	CLT	MOH	TEX	NSH	POC; 31	ROA	ATL	NHA	GLN	IRC	MCH	DAY	DAR	RCH	BRI	LVS	TAL	ROV	TEX	KAN	MAR	PHO	101st	0^{1}	
2022	Jesse Iwuji Motorsports	34	Chevy	DAY; 27	CAL; 36	LVS; 34	PHO	ATL; 27	COA; DNQ	RCH	MAR	TAL; DNQ	DOV	DAR	TEX; 34	CLT	PIR; 26	NSH	ROA; 22	ATL; 32	NHA	POC	IRC	MCH	GLN	DAY; 11	DAR	KAN; 36	BRI	TEX	TAL; 28	ROV	LVS	HOM	MAR	PHO	43rd	94	
2023	Jesse Iwuji Motorsports	34	Chevy	DAY; 30	CAL	LVS	PHO	ATL	COA	RCH	MAR	TAL; DNQ	DOV	DAR	CLT	PIR	SON	NSH	CSC	ATL	NHA	POC	ROA	MCH	IRC	GLN	DAY	DAR	KAN	BRI	TEX	ROV	LVS	HOM	MAR	PHO	63rd	7	
2025	DGM Racing with Jesse Iwuji Motorsports	91	Chevy	DAY	ATL	COA	PHO	LVS	HOM	MAR	DAR	BRI	CAR	TAL; 20	TEX	CLT	NSH	MXC	POC	ATL	CSC	SON	DOV	IND	IOW	GLN	DAY	PIR	GTW	BRI	KAN	ROV	LVS	TAL	MAR	PHO	61st	17	
2026	DGM Racing with Jesse Iwuji Motorsports	91	Chevy	DAY	ATL	COA	PHO	LVS	DAR	MAR	ROC	BRI	KAN	TAL	TEX	GLN	DOV	CLT	NSH	POC	COR; 25	SON	CHI	ATL	IND	IOW	DAY	DAR	GTW	BRI	LVS	CLT	PHO	TAL	MAR	HOM	54th	12	

==== Camping World Truck Series ====
NASCAR Camping World Truck Series results
Year	Team	No.	Make	1	2	3	4	5	6	7	8	9	10	11	12	13	14	15	16	17	18	19	20	21	22	23	NCWTC	Pts	Ref
2018	Reaume Brothers Racing	34	Chevy	DAY	ATL	LVS	MAR	DOV	KAN	CLT	TEX	IOW	GTW	CHI	KEN	ELD	POC	MCH	BRI	MSP; 25	LVS	TAL	MAR	TEX			68th	22	
2018	Copp Motorsports	63	Chevy																						PHO; 27	HOM	68th	22	
2019	Reaume Brothers Racing	34	Chevy	DAY	ATL	LVS; 26	MAR	TEX; 17	DOV	KAN	CLT	TEX	IOW	GTW	CHI; 22	KEN	POC	ELD	MCH; 21	BRI	MSP	LVS; QL^{†}					39th	80	
2019	Reaume Brothers Racing	34	Toyota																				TAL; 19	MAR	PHO	HOM	39th	80	
2020	Reaume Brothers Racing	33	Chevy	DAY	LVS	CLT; 39	ATL	HOM																			49th	35	
2020	Reaume Brothers Racing	33	Toyota						POC; 28	KEN	TEX	KAN	KAN	MCH; 22	DRC	DOV	GTW	DAR	RCH	BRI	LVS; 31	TAL	KAN	TEX	MAR	PHO	49th	35	
2021	Reaume Brothers Racing	34	Toyota	DAY; DNQ	DRC									TEX; 28	NSH	POC	KNX	GLN	GTW	DAR	BRI	LVS	TAL				64th	23	
2021	Reaume Brothers Racing	33	Chevy			LVS; 31	ATL	BRD	RCH	KAN; 38	DAR	COA	CLT														64th	23	
2021	Reaume Brothers Racing	33	Toyota																					MAR; 30	PHO		64th	23	
2022	Reaume Brothers Racing	43	Chevy	DAY	LVS	ATL	COA	MAR	BRD	DAR	KAN; 35	TEX	CLT	GTW	SON	KNX	NSH	MOH	POC	IRP	RCH	KAN	BRI	TAL	HOM	PHO	105th	0^{1}	
^{†} – Qualified but replaced by Justin Johnson

^{*} Season still in progress
^{1} Ineligible for series points

=== ARCA Racing Series ===
(key) (Bold – Pole position awarded by qualifying time. Italics – Pole position earned by points standings or practice time. * – Most laps led.)

ARCA Racing Series results
Year	Team	No.	Make	1	2	3	4	5	6	7	8	9	10	11	12	13	14	15	16	17	18	19	20	ARSC	Pts	Ref
2018	Patriot Motorsports Group	34	Chevy	DAY; 36	NSH	SLM	TAL; 15	TOL	CLT; 26	POC; 24	MCH; 24	MAD	GTW											33rd	630	
2018	Max Force Racing	9	Ford											CHI; 25	IOW	ELK	POC	ISF	BLN	DSF	SLM	IRP	KAN	33rd	630	

==== K&N Pro Series East ====
NASCAR K&N Pro Series East results
Year	Team	No.	Make	1	2	3	4	5	6	7	8	9	10	11	12	13	14	NKNPSEC	Pts	Ref
2017	Patriot Motorsports Group	36	Chevy	NSM; 21	GRE	BRI	SBO	SBO	MEM	BLN	TMP							29th	62	
2017	Patriot Motorsports Group	36	Toyota									NHA; 18	IOW	WGI	LGY	NJM	DOV	29th	62	
2018	Patriot Motorsports Group	36	Chevy	NSM; 22														41st	39	
2018	Patriot Motorsports Group	36	Toyota		BRI; 27	LGY	SBO	SBO	MEM	NJM	THO	NHA	IOW	GLN	GTW	NHA	DOV	41st	39	

==== K&N Pro Series West ====
NASCAR K&N Pro Series West results
Year	Team	No.	Make	1	2	3	4	5	6	7	8	9	10	11	12	13	14	NKNPSWC	Pts	Ref
2015	Patriot Motorsports Group	36	Ford	KER	IRW	TUS	IOW	SHA	SON	SLS	IOW	EVG; 18	CNS	MER; 23				37th	65	
2015	Patriot Motorsports Group	36	Toyota												AAS; DNQ	PHO		37th	65	
2016	Patriot Motorsports Group	36	Chevy	IRW; 20					SON; 15		IOW; 12	EVG; 15		MMP; 13	MMP; 12	MER; 18	AAS; 16	10th	404	
2016	Patriot Motorsports Group	36	Toyota		KCR; 14	TUS; 15	OSS; 10	CNS; 16		SLN; 18			DCS; 18					10th	404	
2017	Patriot Motorsports Group	36	Chevy	TUS; 20	KCR; 16	IRW; 21					SON; 31							14th	358	
2017	Patriot Motorsports Group	36	Toyota				IRW; 18	SPO; 15	OSS; 14	CNS; 14		IOW; 31	EVG; 17	DCS; 13	MER; 13	AAS; 19	KCR; 16	14th	358	
2018	Patriot Motorsports Group	36	Chevy	KCR; 23	TUS; 14	TUS; 17	OSS; 14	CNS										15th	156	
2018	Norman Levin Racing	40	Chevy						SON; 15	DCS								15th	156	
2018	Norman Levin Racing	21	Chevy								IOW; 25	EVG	GTW	LVS	MER	AAS	KCR	15th	156	
