= 2022 Sparks 300 =

28th race of the 2022 NASCAR Xfinity Series

Race details
- Race 28 of 33 of the 2022 NASCAR Xfinity Series
- Date: October 1, 2022
- Official name: 3rd Annual Sparks 300
- Location: Talladega Superspeedway, Lincoln, Alabama
- Course: Permanent racing facility
- Course length: 2.66 miles (4.28 km)
- Distance: 113 laps, 300.58 mi (483.74 km)
- Scheduled distance: 113 laps, 300.58 mi (483.74 km)
- Average speed: 158.827 mph (255.607 km/h)

Pole position
Driver	Austin Hill	Richard Childress Racing
- Time: 52.605

Most laps led
Driver	Austin Hill	Richard Childress Racing
- Laps: 60

Winner
No. 16	A. J. Allmendinger	Kaulig Racing

Television in the United States
- Network: USA Network
- Announcers: Rick Allen, Jeff Burton, and Dale Earnhardt Jr.

Radio in the United States
- Radio: Motor Racing Network

The 2022 Sparks 300 was the 28th stock car race of the 2022 NASCAR Xfinity Series, the second race of the Round of 12, and the 3rd iteration of the event. The race was held on Saturday, October 1, 2022, in Lincoln, Alabama at Talladega Superspeedway, a 2.66 miles (4.28 km) permanent tri-oval shaped superspeedway. The race took the scheduled 113 laps to complete, as the race was rather clean. In a close finish, A. J. Allmendinger, driving for Kaulig Racing, would hold off Sam Mayer on the final lap to earn his 14th career NASCAR Xfinity Series win, along with his fourth of the season. Allmendinger would beat Mayer by 0.015 of a second. He would also earn a spot in the next round of the playoffs. Austin Hill dominated the majority of the race, leading 60 laps and winning both stages. To fill out the podium, Landon Cassill, driving for Kaulig Racing, would finish in 3rd, respectively.

== Background ==
Talladega Superspeedway is located on the former Anniston Air Force Base in the small city of Lincoln. A tri-oval, the track was constructed in 1969 by the International Speedway Corporation, a business controlled by the France Family. As of 2021, the track hosts the NASCAR Cup Series, NASCAR Xfinity Series, NASCAR Camping World Truck Series, and ARCA Menards Series. Talladega is the longest NASCAR oval, with a length of 2.66 miles (4.281 km), compared to the Daytona International Speedway, which is 2.5 miles (4.0 km) long. The total peak capacity of Talladega is around 175,000 spectators, with the main grandstand capacity being about 80,000.

=== Entry list ===
- (R) denotes rookie driver.
- (i) denotes driver who are ineligible for series driver points.

#	Driver	Team	Make
1	Sam Mayer	JR Motorsports	Chevrolet
02	Blaine Perkins	Our Motorsports	Chevrolet
2	Sheldon Creed (R)	Richard Childress Racing	Chevrolet
4	Bayley Currey	JD Motorsports	Chevrolet
5	Joey Gase	B. J. McLeod Motorsports	Ford
6	Ryan Vargas	JD Motorsports	Chevrolet
07	Joe Graf Jr.	SS-Green Light Racing	Ford
7	Justin Allgaier	JR Motorsports	Chevrolet
08	David Starr	SS-Green Light Racing	Ford
8	Josh Berry	JR Motorsports	Chevrolet
9	Noah Gragson	JR Motorsports	Chevrolet
10	Landon Cassill	Kaulig Racing	Chevrolet
11	Daniel Hemric	Kaulig Racing	Chevrolet
13	Timmy Hill (i)	MBM Motorsports	Chevrolet
16	A. J. Allmendinger	Kaulig Racing	Chevrolet
18	Trevor Bayne	Joe Gibbs Racing	Toyota
19	Brandon Jones	Joe Gibbs Racing	Toyota
21	Austin Hill (R)	Richard Childress Racing	Chevrolet
23	Anthony Alfredo	Our Motorsports	Chevrolet
26	Derek Griffith	Sam Hunt Racing	Toyota
27	Jeb Burton	Our Motorsports	Chevrolet
31	Myatt Snider	Jordan Anderson Racing	Chevrolet
34	Jesse Iwuji	Jesse Iwuji Motorsports	Chevrolet
35	Jeffrey Earnhardt	Emerling-Gase Motorsports	Ford
36	Josh Williams	DGM Racing	Chevrolet
38	C. J. McLaughlin	RSS Racing	Ford
39	Ryan Sieg	RSS Racing	Ford
44	Howie DiSavino III	Alpha Prime Racing	Chevrolet
45	Caesar Bacarella	Alpha Prime Racing	Chevrolet
47	Mike Harmon	Mike Harmon Racing	Chevrolet
48	Parker Kligerman (i)	Big Machine Racing	Chevrolet
51	Jeremy Clements	Jeremy Clements Racing	Chevrolet
54	Ty Gibbs	Joe Gibbs Racing	Toyota
66	J. J. Yeley	MBM Motorsports	Chevrolet
68	Brandon Brown	Brandonbilt Motorsports	Chevrolet
78	B. J. McLeod	B. J. McLeod Motorsports	Chevrolet
91	Mason Massey	DGM Racing	Chevrolet
98	Riley Herbst	Stewart-Haas Racing	Ford
Official entry list

== Qualifying ==
Qualifying was held on Friday, September 30, at 4:30 PM CST. Since Talladega Superspeedway is a superspeedway, the qualifying system used is a single-car, one-lap system with two rounds. In the first round, drivers have one lap to set a time. The fastest ten drivers from the first round move on to the second round. Whoever sets the fastest time in Round 2 wins the pole. Austin Hill, driving for Richard Childress Racing, scored the pole for the race, with a lap of 52.605, and an average speed of 182.036 mph (292.959 km/h) in the second round.

Pos.	#	Driver	Team	Make	Time (R1)	Speed (R1)	Time (R2)	Speed (R2)
1	21	Austin Hill (R)	Richard Childress Racing	Chevrolet	52.757	181.511	52.605	182.036
2	54	Ty Gibbs	Joe Gibbs Racing	Toyota	52.684	181.763	52.621	181.981
3	2	Sheldon Creed (R)	Richard Childress Racing	Chevrolet	52.743	181.560	52.653	181.870
4	7	Justin Allgaier	JR Motorsports	Chevrolet	52.962	180.809	52.752	181.529
5	19	Brandon Jones	Joe Gibbs Racing	Toyota	52.848	181.199	52.817	181.305
6	9	Noah Gragson	JR Motorsports	Chevrolet	52.976	180.761	52.867	181.134
7	8	Josh Berry	JR Motorsports	Chevrolet	53.015	180.628	52.891	181.052
8	16	A. J. Allmendinger	Kaulig Racing	Chevrolet	52.949	180.853	52.926	180.932
9	48	Parker Kligerman (i)	Big Machine Racing	Chevrolet	52.966	180.795	52.970	180.782
10	6	Ryan Vargas	JD Motorsports	Chevrolet	52.984	180.734	53.007	180.655
Eliminated from Round 1
11	18	Trevor Bayne	Joe Gibbs Racing	Toyota	53.060	180.475	-	-
12	11	Daniel Hemric	Kaulig Racing	Chevrolet	53.089	180.376	-	-
13	1	Sam Mayer	JR Motorsports	Chevrolet	53.104	180.325	-	-
14	39	Ryan Sieg	RSS Racing	Ford	53.156	180.149	-	-
15	02	Blaine Perkins (i)	Our Motorsports	Chevrolet	53.176	180.081	-	-
16	27	Jeb Burton	Our Motorsports	Chevrolet	53.180	180.068	-	-
17	68	Brandon Brown	Brandonbilt Motorsports	Chevrolet	53.215	179.949	-	-
18	10	Landon Cassill	Kaulig Racing	Chevrolet	53.223	179.922	-	-
19	07	Joe Graf Jr.	SS-Green Light Racing	Ford	53.225	179.915	-	-
20	23	Anthony Alfredo	Our Motorsports	Chevrolet	53.234	179.885	-	-
21	31	Myatt Snider	Jordan Anderson Racing	Chevrolet	53.277	179.740	-	-
22	34	Jesse Iwuji	Jesse Iwuji Motorsports	Chevrolet	53.282	179.723	-	-
23	98	Riley Herbst	Stewart-Haas Racing	Ford	53.312	179.622	-	-
24	4	Bayley Currey	JD Motorsports	Chevrolet	53.329	179.565	-	-
25	5	Joey Gase	B. J. McLeod Motorsports/Emerling-Gase Motorsports	Ford	53.400	179.326	-	-
26	26	Derek Griffith	Sam Hunt Racing	Toyota	53.446	179.172	-	-
27	35	Jeffrey Earnhardt	Emerling-Gase Motorsports	Ford	53.490	179.024	-	-
28	38	C. J. McLaughlin	RSS Racing	Ford	53.504	178.977	-	-
29	91	Mason Massey	DGM Racing	Chevrolet	53.506	178.971	-	-
30	36	Josh Williams	DGM Racing	Chevrolet	53.608	178.630	-	-
31	45	Caesar Bacarella	Alpha Prime Racing	Chevrolet	53.645	178.507	-	-
32	78	B. J. McLeod	B. J. McLeod Motorsports	Chevrolet	53.658	178.464	-	-
33	08	David Starr	SS-Green Light Racing	Ford	53.659	178.460	-	-
Qualified by owner's points
34	44	Howie DiSavino III	Alpha Prime Racing	Chevrolet	53.766	178.105	-	-
35	66	J. J. Yeley	MBM Motorsports	Chevrolet	53.804	177.979	-	-
36	13	Timmy Hill (i)	MBM Motorsports	Chevrolet	53.819	177.930	-	-
37	51	Jeremy Clements	Jeremy Clements Racing	Chevrolet	54.101	177.002	-	-
38	47	Mike Harmon	Mike Harmon Racing	Chevrolet	-	-	-	-
Official qualifying results
Official starting lineup

== Race results ==
Stage 1 Laps: 25

Pos.	#	Driver	Team	Make	Pts
1	21	Austin Hill (R)	Richard Childress Racing	Chevrolet	10
2	2	Sheldon Creed (R)	Richard Childress Racing	Chevrolet	9
3	11	Daniel Hemric	Kaulig Racing	Chevrolet	8
4	19	Brandon Jones	Joe Gibbs Racing	Toyota	7
5	18	Trevor Bayne	Joe Gibbs Racing	Toyota	6
6	16	A. J. Allmendinger	Kaulig Racing	Chevrolet	5
7	7	Justin Allgaier	JR Motorsports	Chevrolet	4
8	54	Ty Gibbs	Joe Gibbs Racing	Toyota	3
9	68	Brandon Brown	Brandonbilt Motorsports	Chevrolet	2
10	1	Sam Mayer	JR Motorsports	Chevrolet	1

Stage 2 Laps: 25

Pos.	#	Driver	Team	Make	Pts
1	21	Austin Hill (R)	Richard Childress Racing	Chevrolet	10
2	7	Justin Allgaier	JR Motorsports	Chevrolet	9
3	16	A. J. Allmendinger	Kaulig Racing	Chevrolet	8
4	18	Trevor Bayne	Joe Gibbs Racing	Toyota	7
5	27	Jeb Burton	Our Motorsports	Chevrolet	6
6	1	Sam Mayer	JR Motorsports	Chevrolet	5
7	68	Brandon Brown	Brandonbilt Motorsports	Chevrolet	4
8	19	Brandon Jones	Joe Gibbs Racing	Toyota	3
9	39	Ryan Sieg	RSS Racing	Ford	2
10	8	Josh Berry	JR Motorsports	Chevrolet	1

Stage 3 Laps: 63

Fin.	St	#	Driver	Team	Make	Laps	Led	Status	Pts
1	8	16	A. J. Allmendinger	Kaulig Racing	Chevrolet	113	3	Running	53
2	13	1	Sam Mayer	JR Motorsports	Chevrolet	113	3	Running	41
3	18	10	Landon Cassill	Kaulig Racing	Chevrolet	113	0	Running	34
4	14	39	Ryan Sieg	RSS Racing	Ford	113	11	Running	35
5	7	8	Josh Berry	JR Motorsports	Chevrolet	113	0	Running	33
6	9	48	Parker Kligerman (i)	Big Machine Racing	Chevrolet	113	0	Running	0
7	2	54	Ty Gibbs	Joe Gibbs Racing	Toyota	113	0	Running	33
8	12	11	Daniel Hemric	Kaulig Racing	Chevrolet	113	0	Running	37
9	5	19	Brandon Jones	Joe Gibbs Racing	Toyota	113	1	Running	38
10	6	9	Noah Gragson	JR Motorsports	Chevrolet	113	1	Running	27
11	23	98	Riley Herbst	Stewart-Haas Racing	Ford	113	0	Running	26
12	3	2	Sheldon Creed (R)	Richard Childress Racing	Chevrolet	113	2	Running	34
13	11	18	Trevor Bayne	Joe Gibbs Racing	Toyota	113	13	Running	37
14	1	21	Austin Hill (R)	Richard Childress Racing	Chevrolet	113	60	Running	43
15	4	7	Justin Allgaier	JR Motorsports	Chevrolet	113	6	Running	35
16	20	23	Anthony Alfredo	Our Motorsports	Chevrolet	113	0	Running	21
17	16	27	Jeb Burton	Our Motorsports	Chevrolet	113	0	Running	26
18	35	66	J. J. Yeley	MBM Motorsports	Chevrolet	113	0	Running	19
19	30	36	Josh Williams	DGM Racing	Chevrolet	113	0	Running	18
20	37	51	Jeremy Clements	Jeremy Clements Racing	Chevrolet	113	0	Running	17
21	25	5	Joey Gase	B. J. McLeod Motorsports	Ford	113	0	Running	16
22	19	07	Joe Graf Jr.	SS-Green Light Racing	Ford	113	0	Running	15
23	26	26	Derek Griffith	Sam Hunt Racing	Toyota	113	0	Running	14
24	24	4	Bayley Currey	JD Motorsports	Chevrolet	112	12	Running	13
25	33	08	David Starr	SS-Green Light Racing	Ford	112	0	Running	12
26	32	78	B. J. McLeod	B. J. McLeod Motorsports	Chevrolet	112	0	Running	11
27	36	13	Timmy Hill (i)	MBM Motorsports	Chevrolet	112	1	Running	0
28	22	34	Jesse Iwuji	Jesse Iwuji Motorsports	Chevrolet	112	0	Running	9
29	28	38	C. J. McLaughlin	RSS Racing	Ford	112	0	Running	8
30	10	6	Ryan Vargas	JD Motorsports	Chevrolet	112	0	Running	7
31	31	45	Caesar Bacarella	Alpha Prime Racing	Chevrolet	112	0	Running	6
32	34	44	Howie DiSavino III	Alpha Prime Racing	Chevrolet	112	0	Running	5
33	17	68	Brandon Brown	Brandonbilt Motorsports	Chevrolet	112	0	Running	10
34	38	47	Mike Harmon	Mike Harmon Racing	Chevrolet	111	0	Running	3
35	21	31	Myatt Snider	Jordan Anderson Racing	Chevrolet	111	0	Running	2
36	15	02	Blaine Perkins (i)	Our Motorsports	Chevrolet	110	0	Running	0
37	27	35	Jeffrey Earnhardt	Emerling-Gase Motorsports	Ford	109	0	Running	1
38	29	91	Mason Massey	DGM Racing	Chevrolet	95	0	Running	1
Official race results

== Standings after the race ==
Drivers' Championship standings

	Pos	Driver	Points
1	1	A. J. Allmendinger	2,134
1	2	Noah Gragson	2,134
	3	Ty Gibbs	2,113 (-21)
	4	Austin Hill	2,107 (-27)
	5	Josh Berry	2,091 (-43)
	6	Justin Allgaier	2,089 (-55)
	7	Sam Mayer	2,076 (-58)
	8	Ryan Sieg	2,070 (-64)
1	9	Daniel Hemric	2,064 (-70)
1	10	Riley Herbst	2,060 (-74)
	11	Brandon Jones	2,060 (-74)
	12	Jeremy Clements	2,023 (-111)
Official driver's standings

- Note: Only the first 12 positions are included for the driver standings.

Previous race: 2022 Andy's Frozen Custard 300	NASCAR Xfinity Series; 2022 season	Next race: 2022 Drive for the Cure 250
