= 2022 Henry 180 =

16th race of the 2022 NASCAR Xfinity Series

Race details
- Race 16 of 33 of the 2022 NASCAR Xfinity Series
- Date: July 2, 2022
- Official name: 13th Annual Henry 180
- Location: Road America, Elkhart Lake, Wisconsin
- Course: Permanent racing facility
- Course length: 4.048 miles (6.515 km)
- Distance: 48 laps, 194.30 mi (312.70 km)
- Scheduled distance: 45 laps, 182.16 mi (293.16 km)
- Average speed: 74.621 mph (120.091 km/h)

Pole position
Driver	Kyle Larson	Hendrick Motorsports
- Time: 2:14.318

Most laps led
Driver	Kyle Larson	Hendrick Motorsports
- Laps: 31

Winner
No. 54	Ty Gibbs	Joe Gibbs Racing

Television in the United States
- Network: USA Network
- Announcers: Rick Allen, Jeff Burton, Steve Letarte

Radio in the United States
- Radio: Motor Racing Network

The 2022 Henry 180 was the sixteenth stock car race of the 2022 NASCAR Xfinity Series, and the 13th iteration of the event. The race was held on Saturday, July 2, 2022, in Elkhart Lake, Wisconsin at Road America, a 4.048 miles (6.515 km) permanent road course. The race was increased from 45 laps to 48 laps, due to a NASCAR overtime finish. Ty Gibbs, driving for Joe Gibbs Racing, made a last lap pass on Kyle Larson, and earned his 8th career NASCAR Xfinity Series win, along with his fourth of the season. To fill out the podium, Josh Berry, driving for JR Motorsports, would finish in 3rd, respectively.

The race was marred by a crash on lap 25. With 20 laps to go in the race, tempers began to flare between Noah Gragson and Sage Karam, after having a full-contact battle for the 10th-place position. Gragson showed his displeasure by giving Karam the middle finger after exiting turn 1. After the contact continued, Gragson became frustrated, and made a right turn into the side of Karam, spinning them both in front of the pack. After dust was kicked up from the spin, the field behind them was blind, causing confusion for the drivers. 16 cars would be collected in the wreck, with some drivers having brutal hits. The worst hit was Brandon Brown, after slamming into the side of Tyler Reddick at a high force. Brown got out of his car under his own power, but immediately went over to the right side of the wall and sat down in pain. Three days after the race, Gragson was fined US$35,000 and docked 30 driver and owner points.

This was the debut race for the 2021 ARCA Menards Series East champion, Sammy Smith.

== Background ==
Road America is a motorsport road course located near Elkhart Lake, Wisconsin, United States on Wisconsin Highway 67. It has hosted races since the 1950s and currently hosts races in the NASCAR Cup and Xfinity Series, WeatherTech SportsCar Championship, IndyCar Series, SCCA Pirelli World Challenge, ASRA, AMA Superbike series, and SCCA Pro Racing's Trans-Am Series.

=== Entry list ===
- (R) denotes rookie driver.
- (i) denotes driver who are ineligible for series driver points.

#	Driver	Team	Make
1	Sam Mayer	JR Motorsports	Chevrolet
02	Brett Moffitt	Our Motorsports	Chevrolet
2	Sheldon Creed (R)	Richard Childress Racing	Chevrolet
4	Bayley Currey	JD Motorsports	Chevrolet
5	Joe Graf Jr.	B. J. McLeod Motorsports	Ford
6	Ty Dillon (i)	JD Motorsports	Chevrolet
07	Cole Custer (i)	SS-Green Light Racing	Ford
7	Justin Allgaier	JR Motorsports	Chevrolet
08	Andy Lally	SS-Green Light Racing	Ford
8	Josh Berry	JR Motorsports	Chevrolet
9	Noah Gragson	JR Motorsports	Chevrolet
10	Landon Cassill	Kaulig Racing	Chevrolet
11	Daniel Hemric	Kaulig Racing	Chevrolet
13	Will Rodgers	MBM Motorsports	Toyota
16	A. J. Allmendinger	Kaulig Racing	Chevrolet
17	Kyle Larson (i)	Hendrick Motorsports	Chevrolet
18	Sammy Smith	Joe Gibbs Racing	Toyota
19	Brandon Jones	Joe Gibbs Racing	Toyota
21	Austin Hill (R)	Richard Childress Racing	Chevrolet
23	Anthony Alfredo	Our Motorsports	Chevrolet
26	John Hunter Nemechek (i)	Sam Hunt Racing	Toyota
27	Jeb Burton	Our Motorsports	Chevrolet
31	Myatt Snider	Jordan Anderson Racing	Chevrolet
34	Jesse Iwuji (R) (Note: Due to a naval obligation, Kyle Weatherman practiced and qualified Iwuji's No. 34 car. Iwuji competed in the race.)	Jesse Iwuji Motorsports	Chevrolet
35	Chris Dyson	Emerling-Gase Motorsports	Toyota
36	Alex Labbé	DGM Racing	Chevrolet
38	Patrick Gallagher	RSS Racing	Ford
39	Ryan Sieg	RSS Racing	Ford
44	Josh Bilicki (i)	Alpha Prime Racing	Chevrolet
45	Sage Karam	Alpha Prime Racing	Chevrolet
47	Ryan Vargas	Mike Harmon Racing	Chevrolet
48	Tyler Reddick (i)	Big Machine Racing	Chevrolet
51	Jeremy Clements	Jeremy Clements Racing	Chevrolet
54	Ty Gibbs	Joe Gibbs Racing	Toyota
66	J. J. Yeley	MBM Motorsports	Toyota
68	Brandon Brown	Brandonbilt Motorsports	Chevrolet
78	Josh Williams	B. J. McLeod Motorsports	Chevrolet
88	Miguel Paludo	JR Motorsports	Chevrolet
91	Preston Pardus	DGM Racing	Chevrolet
92	Dexter Bean	DGM Racing	Chevrolet
98	Riley Herbst	Stewart-Haas Racing	Ford
Official entry list

== Practice ==
The only 30-minute practice session was held on Friday, July 1, at 4:30 PM CST. Cole Custer, driving for SS-Green Light Racing, was the fastest in the session, with a time of 2:15.562 seconds, and a speed of 107.499 mph (173.003 km/h).

Pos.	#	Driver	Team	Make	Time	Speed
1	07	Cole Custer (i)	SS-Green Light Racing	Ford	2:15.562	107.499
2	16	A. J. Allmendinger	Kaulig Racing	Chevrolet	2:15.845	107.275
3	54	Ty Gibbs	Joe Gibbs Racing	Toyota	2:15.936	107.203
Full practice results

== Qualifying ==
Qualifying was held on Friday, July 1, at 5:00 PM CST. Since Road America is a road course, the qualifying system is a two group system, with two rounds. Drivers will be separated into two groups, Group A and Group B. Each driver will have a lap to set a time. The fastest 5 drivers from each group will advance to the final round. Drivers will also have one lap to set a time. The fastest driver to set a time in the round will win the pole.

Kyle Larson, driving for Hendrick Motorsports, scored the pole for the race, with a time of 2:14.318 seconds, and a speed of 108.495 mph (174.606 km/h).

Pos.	#	Driver	Team	Make	Time (R1)	Speed (R1)	Time (R2)	Speed (R2)
1	17	Kyle Larson (i)	Hendrick Motorsports	Chevrolet	2:15.339	107.676	2:14.318	108.495
2	54	Ty Gibbs	Joe Gibbs Racing	Toyota	2:15.496	107.552	2:15.031	107.922
3	98	Riley Herbst	Stewart-Haas Racing	Ford	2:15.556	107.504	2:15.390	107.636
4	07	Cole Custer (i)	SS-Green Light Racing	Ford	2:14.792	108.113	2:15.442	107.594
5	1	Sam Mayer	JR Motorsports	Chevrolet	2:14.695	108.191	2:15.706	107.385
6	2	Sheldon Creed (R)	Richard Childress Racing	Chevrolet	2:15.686	107.401	2:15.808	107.304
7	9	Noah Gragson	JR Motorsports	Chevrolet	2:15.679	107.406	2:16.127	107.053
8	18	Sammy Smith	Joe Gibbs Racing	Toyota	2:15.805	107.307	2:16.409	106.832
9	48	Tyler Reddick (i)	Big Machine Racing	Chevrolet	2:15.087	107.877	2:16.564	106.710
10	21	Austin Hill (R)	Richard Childress Racing	Chevrolet	2:16.093	107.080	2:17.122	106.276
Eliminated from Round 1
11	51	Jeremy Clements	Jeremy Clements Racing	Chevrolet	2:16.104	107.071	-	-
12	45	Sage Karam	Alpha Prime Racing	Chevrolet	2:16.318	106.903	-	-
13	44	Josh Bilicki (i)	Alpha Prime Racing	Chevrolet	2:16.319	106.902	-	-
14	19	Brandon Jones	Joe Gibbs Racing	Toyota	2:16.360	106.870	-	-
15	7	Justin Allgaier	JR Motorsports	Chevrolet	2:16.379	106.855	-	-
16	8	Josh Berry	JR Motorsports	Chevrolet	2:16.473	106.782	-	-
17	02	Brett Moffitt	Our Motorsports	Chevrolet	2:16.491	106.767	-	-
18	36	Alex Labbé	DGM Racing	Chevrolet	2:16.576	106.701	-	-
19	23	Anthony Alfredo	Our Motorsports	Chevrolet	2:16.584	106.695	-	-
20	10	Landon Cassill	Kaulig Racing	Chevrolet	2:16.591	106.689	-	-
21	91	Preston Pardus	DGM Racing	Chevrolet	2:16.736	106.576	-	-
22	11	Daniel Hemric	Kaulig Racing	Chevrolet	2:16.820	106.511	-	-
23	08	Andy Lally	SS-Green Light Racing	Ford	2:16.838	106.497	-	-
24	34	Kyle Weatherman	Jesse Iwuji Motorsports	Chevrolet	2:17.110	106.285	-	-
25	88	Miguel Paludo	JR Motorsports	Chevrolet	2:17.275	106.158	-	-
26	6	Ty Dillon (i)	JD Motorsports	Chevrolet	2:17.554	105.942	-	-
27	39	Ryan Sieg	RSS Racing	Ford	2:17.665	105.857	-	-
28	13	Will Rodgers	MBM Motorsports	Toyota	2:18.011	105.592	-	-
29	35	Chris Dyson	Emerling-Gase Motorsports	Toyota	2:18.074	105.543	-	-
30	4	Bayley Currey	JD Motorsports	Chevrolet	2:18.386	105.305	-	-
31	78	Josh Williams	B. J. McLeod Motorsports	Chevrolet	2:18.463	105.247	-	-
32	31	Myatt Snider	Jordan Anderson Racing	Chevrolet	2:18.517	105.206	-	-
Qualified by owner's points
33	38	Patrick Gallagher	RSS Racing	Ford	2:18.603	105.141	-	-
34	27	Jeb Burton	Our Motorsports	Chevrolet	2:18.627	105.122	-	-
35	26	John Hunter Nemechek (i)	Sam Hunt Racing	Toyota	2:19.013	104.830	-	-
36	68	Brandon Brown	Brandonbilt Motorsports	Chevrolet	2:19.284	104.627	-	-
37	5	Joe Graf Jr.	B. J. McLeod Motorsports	Ford	2:20.525	103.703	-	-
38	16	A. J. Allmendinger	Kaulig Racing	Chevrolet	-	-	-	-
Failed to Qualify
39	66	J. J. Yeley	MBM Motorsports	Toyota	2:19.403	104.537	-	-
40	92	Dexter Bean	DGM Racing	Chevrolet	2:20.685	103.585	-	-
41	47	Ryan Vargas	Mike Harmon Racing	Chevrolet	2:22.436	102.311	-	-
Official qualifying results
Official starting lineup

== Race results ==
Stage 1 Laps: 10

Pos.	#	Driver	Team	Make	Pts
1	17	Kyle Larson (i)	Hendrick Motorsports	Chevrolet	0
2	54	Ty Gibbs	Joe Gibbs Racing	Toyota	9
3	07	Cole Custer (i)	SS-Green Light Racing	Ford	0
4	98	Riley Herbst	Stewart-Haas Racing	Ford	7
5	19	Brandon Jones	Joe Gibbs Racing	Toyota	6
6	9	Noah Gragson	JR Motorsports	Chevrolet	5
7	1	Sam Mayer	JR Motorsports	Chevrolet	4
8	51	Jeremy Clements	Jeremy Clements Racing	Chevrolet	3
9	16	A. J. Allmendinger	Kaulig Racing	Chevrolet	2
10	45	Sage Karam	Alpha Prime Racing	Chevrolet	1

Stage 2 Laps: 10

Pos.	#	Driver	Team	Make	Pts
1	17	Kyle Larson (i)	Hendrick Motorsports	Chevrolet	0
2	2	Sheldon Creed (R)	Richard Childress Racing	Chevrolet	9
3	07	Cole Custer (i)	SS-Green Light Racing	Ford	0
4	26	John Hunter Nemechek (i)	Sam Hunt Racing	Toyota	0
5	7	Justin Allgaier	JR Motorsports	Chevrolet	6
6	18	Sammy Smith	Joe Gibbs Racing	Toyota	5
7	98	Riley Herbst	Stewart-Haas Racing	Ford	4
8	51	Jeremy Clements	Jeremy Clements Racing	Chevrolet	3
9	9	Noah Gragson	JR Motorsports	Chevrolet	2
10	36	Alex Labbé	DGM Racing	Chevrolet	1

Stage 3 Laps: 25

Fin.	St	#	Driver	Team	Make	Laps	Led	Status	Pts
1	2	54	Ty Gibbs	Joe Gibbs Racing	Toyota	48	5	Running	49
2	1	17	Kyle Larson (i)	Hendrick Motorsports	Chevrolet	48	31	Running	0
3	16	8	Josh Berry	JR Motorsports	Chevrolet	48	0	Running	34
4	10	21	Austin Hill (R)	Richard Childress Racing	Chevrolet	48	0	Running	33
5	14	19	Brandon Jones	Joe Gibbs Racing	Toyota	48	0	Running	38
6	38	16	A. J. Allmendinger	Kaulig Racing	Chevrolet	48	1	Running	33
7	3	98	Riley Herbst	Stewart-Haas Racing	Ford	48	0	Running	41
8	7	9	Noah Gragson	JR Motorsports	Chevrolet	48	0	Running	36
9	11	51	Jeremy Clements	Jeremy Clements Racing	Chevrolet	48	0	Running	34
10	27	39	Ryan Sieg	RSS Racing	Ford	48	2	Running	27
11	21	91	Preston Pardus	DGM Racing	Chevrolet	48	0	Running	26
12	15	7	Justin Allgaier	JR Motorsports	Chevrolet	48	3	Running	31
13	13	44	Josh Bilicki (i)	Alpha Prime Racing	Chevrolet	48	0	Running	0
14	23	08	Andy Lally	SS-Green Light Racing	Ford	48	0	Running	23
15	18	36	Alex Labbé	DGM Racing	Chevrolet	48	0	Running	23
16	30	4	Bayley Currey	JD Motorsports	Chevrolet	48	0	Running	21
17	31	78	Josh Williams	B. J. McLeod Motorsports	Chevrolet	48	0	Running	20
18	35	26	John Hunter Nemechek (i)	Sam Hunt Racing	Toyota	48	0	Running	0
19	33	38	Patrick Gallagher	RSS Racing	Ford	48	0	Running	18
20	5	1	Sam Mayer	JR Motorsports	Chevrolet	48	0	Running	21
21	34	27	Jeb Burton	Our Motorsports	Chevrolet	48	0	Running	16
22	24	34	Jesse Iwuji	Jesse Iwuji Motorsports	Chevrolet	48	0	Running	15
23	19	23	Anthony Alfredo	Our Motorsports	Chevrolet	47	0	Running	14
24	8	18	Sammy Smith	Joe Gibbs Racing	Toyota	45	0	Engine	18
25	4	07	Cole Custer (i)	SS-Green Light Racing	Ford	43	6	Accident	0
26	25	88	Miguel Paludo	JR Motorsports	Chevrolet	39	0	Accident	11
27	6	2	Sheldon Creed (R)	Richard Childress Racing	Chevrolet	37	0	Engine	19
28	29	35	Chris Dyson	Emerling-Gase Motorsports	Toyota	33	0	Accident	9
29	22	11	Daniel Hemric	Kaulig Racing	Chevrolet	27	0	Accident	8
30	9	48	Tyler Reddick (i)	Big Machine Racing	Chevrolet	25	0	Accident	0
31	12	45	Sage Karam	Alpha Prime Racing	Chevrolet	24	0	Accident	7
32	20	10	Landon Cassill	Kaulig Racing	Chevrolet	24	0	Accident	5
33	32	31	Myatt Snider	Jordan Anderson Racing	Chevrolet	24	0	Accident	4
34	36	68	Brandon Brown	Brandonbilt Motorsports	Chevrolet	24	0	Accident	3
35	17	02	Brett Moffitt	Our Motorsports	Chevrolet	24	0	Accident	2
36	37	5	Joe Graf Jr.	B. J. McLeod Motorsports	Ford	17	0	Brakes	1
37	26	6	Ty Dillon (i)	JD Motorsports	Chevrolet	13	0	Header	0
38	28	13	Will Rodgers	MBM Motorsports	Toyota	9	0	Suspension	1
Official race results

=== Penalties ===
Noah Gragson was fined US$35,000 dollars and was docked 30 driver points while his team JR Motorsports was docked the same amount in owner points for an incident involving Sage Karam during lap 25, which resulted in an 14-car wreck.

== Standings after the race ==
Drivers' Championship standings

Pos	Driver	Points
1	A. J. Allmendinger	634
2	Ty Gibbs	625 (-9)
3	Justin Allgaier	600 (-34)
4	Noah Gragson	595 (-39)
5	Josh Berry	560 (-74)
6	Brandon Jones	495 (-139)
7	Sam Mayer	487 (-147)
8	Austin Hill	485 (-149)
9	Riley Herbst	454 (-180)
10	Daniel Hemric	417 (-217)
11	Ryan Sieg	400 (-234)
12	Landon Cassill	390 (-244)
Official driver's standings

- Note: Only the first 12 positions are included for the driver standings.

Previous race: 2022 Tennessee Lottery 250	NASCAR Xfinity Series; 2022 season	Next race: 2022 Alsco Uniforms 250
