= 2022 Wawa 250 =

23rd race of the 2022 NASCAR Xfinity Series

2022 Wawa 250 Powered by Coca-Cola
Race details
- Race 23 of 33 of the 2022 NASCAR Xfinity Series
- Date: August 26–27, 2022
- Official name: 21st Annual Wawa 250
- Location: Daytona International Speedway, Daytona Beach, Florida
- Course: Permanent racing facility
- Course length: 2.5 miles (4.0 km)
- Distance: 118 laps, 295 mi (474.756 km)
- Scheduled distance: 100 laps, 250 mi (400 km)
- Average speed: 113.328 mph (182.384 km/h)

Pole position
Driver	A. J. Allmendinger	Kaulig Racing
- Grid positions set by competition-based formula

Most laps led
Driver	Noah Gragson	JR Motorsports
- Laps: 52

Winner
No. 51	Jeremy Clements	Jeremy Clements Racing

Television in the United States
- Network: USA Network
- Announcers: Rick Allen, Jeff Burton, Steve Letarte, and Dale Earnhardt Jr.

Radio in the United States
- Radio: Motor Racing Network

The 2022 Wawa 250 Powered by Coca-Cola was the 23rd stock car race of the 2022 NASCAR Xfinity Series, and the 21st iteration of the event. Due to inclement weather, the first half of the race was held on Friday, August 26, 2022, and the second half was held on Saturday, August 27, in Daytona Beach, Florida at Daytona International Speedway, a 2.5 miles (4.0 km) permanent D-shaped superspeedway. The race was increased from 100 laps to 118 laps, due to several NASCAR overtime finishes. In a chaotic and wreck filled race, Jeremy Clements, driving for his family team, Jeremy Clements Racing, scored the upset win after taking the lead when the final caution came out on the last lap. This was Clements' second career NASCAR Xfinity Series win, and his first of the season. Ironically, it was also the same date that Clements won his first Xfinity Series race, the 2017 Johnsonville 180. Noah Gragson mainly dominated the race, leading 52 laps before being wrecked out. The final podium consisted of Timmy Hill, who finished a career best 2nd place finish for MBM Motorsports. Despite damage to the front of his car, A. J. Allmendinger, driving for Kaulig Racing, would finish in 3rd. The rest of the top 10 consisted of Brandon Brown, Sage Karam, Ryan Vargas, Ty Gibbs, Alex Labbé, J. J. Yeley, and Kyle Sieg, with most drivers earning a career best finish.

== Background ==
Daytona International Speedway is a race track in Daytona Beach, Florida, United States. Since opening in 1959, it has been the home of the Daytona 500, the most prestigious race in NASCAR as well as its season opening event. In addition to NASCAR, the track also hosts races of ARCA, AMA Superbike, IMSA, SCCA, and Motocross. The track features multiple layouts including the primary 2.500 mi (4.023 km) high-speed tri-oval, a 3.560 mi (5.729 km) sports car course, a 2.950 mi (4.748 km) motorcycle course, and a 1,320 ft (402.3 m) karting and motorcycle flat-track. The track's 180-acre (72.8 ha) infield includes the 29-acre (11.7 ha) Lake Lloyd, which has hosted powerboat racing. The speedway is operated by NASCAR pursuant to a lease with the City of Daytona Beach on the property that runs until 2054.

=== Entry list ===
- (R) denotes rookie driver.
- (i) denotes driver who are ineligible for series driver points.

#	Driver	Team	Make
1	Sam Mayer	JR Motorsports	Chevrolet
02	Blaine Perkins (i)	Our Motorsports	Chevrolet
2	Sheldon Creed (R)	Richard Childress Racing	Chevrolet
4	Bayley Currey	JD Motorsports	Chevrolet
5	Josh Williams	B. J. McLeod Motorsports	Ford
6	Ryan Vargas	JD Motorsports	Chevrolet
07	Joe Graf Jr.	SS-Green Light Racing	Ford
7	Justin Allgaier	JR Motorsports	Chevrolet
08	David Starr	SS-Green Light Racing	Ford
8	Josh Berry	JR Motorsports	Chevrolet
9	Noah Gragson	JR Motorsports	Chevrolet
10	Landon Cassill	Kaulig Racing	Chevrolet
11	Daniel Hemric	Kaulig Racing	Chevrolet
13	Timmy Hill (i)	MBM Motorsports	Chevrolet
14	Justin Haley (i)	Kaulig Racing	Chevrolet
16	A. J. Allmendinger	Kaulig Racing	Chevrolet
18	Sammy Smith	Joe Gibbs Racing	Toyota
19	Brandon Jones	Joe Gibbs Racing	Toyota
21	Austin Hill (R)	Richard Childress Racing	Chevrolet
23	Anthony Alfredo	Our Motorsports	Chevrolet
24	Joe Nemechek	Sam Hunt Racing	Toyota
26	John Hunter Nemechek (i)	Sam Hunt Racing	Toyota
27	Jeb Burton	Our Motorsports	Chevrolet
28	C. J. McLaughlin	RSS Racing	Ford
31	Myatt Snider	Jordan Anderson Racing	Chevrolet
34	Jesse Iwuji (R)	Jesse Iwuji Motorsports	Chevrolet
35	Joey Gase	Emerling-Gase Motorsports	Toyota
36	Alex Labbé	DGM Racing	Chevrolet
38	Kyle Sieg (R)	RSS Racing	Ford
39	Ryan Sieg	RSS Racing	Ford
44	Sage Karam	Alpha Prime Racing	Chevrolet
45	Caesar Bacarella	Alpha Prime Racing	Chevrolet
47	Tim Viens (i)	Mike Harmon Racing	Chevrolet
48	Ricky Stenhouse Jr. (i)	Big Machine Racing	Chevrolet
51	Jeremy Clements	Jeremy Clements Racing	Chevrolet
54	Ty Gibbs	Joe Gibbs Racing	Toyota
66	J. J. Yeley	MBM Motorsports	Chevrolet
68	Brandon Brown	Brandonbilt Motorsports	Chevrolet
77	Ronnie Bassett Jr.	Bassett Racing	Chevrolet
78	Matt Mills (i)	B. J. McLeod Motorsports	Chevrolet
91	Mason Massey	DGM Racing	Chevrolet
92	Josh Williams	DGM Racing	Chevrolet
98	Riley Herbst	Stewart-Haas Racing	Ford
Official entry list

== Qualifying ==
Qualifying was scheduled to be on Friday, August 26, at 3:00 PM EST. Since Daytona International Speedway is a superspeedway, the qualifying system used is a single-car, single-lap system with two rounds. In the first round, drivers have one lap to set a time. The fastest ten drivers from the first round move on to the second round. Whoever sets the fastest time in Round 2 wins the pole. Qualifying was cancelled due to inclement weather. The starting lineup was determined by a performance-based metric system. As a result, A. J. Allmendinger, driving for Kaulig Racing, would earn the pole.

Pos.	#	Driver	Team	Make
1	16	A. J. Allmendinger	Kaulig Racing	Chevrolet
2	9	Noah Gragson	JR Motorsports	Chevrolet
3	18	Sammy Smith	Joe Gibbs Racing	Toyota
4	1	Sam Mayer	JR Motorsports	Chevrolet
5	8	Josh Berry	JR Motorsports	Chevrolet
6	98	Riley Herbst	Stewart-Haas Racing	Ford
7	2	Sheldon Creed (R)	Richard Childress Racing	Chevrolet
8	54	Ty Gibbs	Joe Gibbs Racing	Toyota
9	51	Jeremy Clements	Jeremy Clements Racing	Chevrolet
10	10	Landon Cassill	Kaulig Racing	Chevrolet
11	39	Ryan Sieg	RSS Racing	Ford
12	19	Brandon Jones	Joe Gibbs Racing	Toyota
13	23	Anthony Alfredo	Our Motorsports	Chevrolet
14	21	Austin Hill (R)	Richard Childress Racing	Chevrolet
15	7	Justin Allgaier	JR Motorsports	Chevrolet
16	11	Daniel Hemric	Kaulig Racing	Chevrolet
17	48	Ricky Stenhouse Jr. (i)	Big Machine Racing	Chevrolet
18	02	Blaine Perkins (i)	Our Motorsports	Chevrolet
19	26	John Hunter Nemechek (i)	Sam Hunt Racing	Toyota
20	07	Joe Graf Jr.	SS-Green Light Racing	Ford
21	36	Alex Labbé	DGM Racing	Chevrolet
22	31	Myatt Snider	Jordan Anderson Racing	Chevrolet
23	4	Bayley Currey	JD Motorsports	Chevrolet
24	44	Sage Karam	Alpha Prime Racing	Chevrolet
25	68	Brandon Brown	Brandonbilt Motorsports	Chevrolet
26	08	David Starr	SS-Green Light Racing	Ford
27	91	Mason Massey	DGM Racing	Chevrolet
28	66	J. J. Yeley	MBM Motorsports	Chevrolet
29	27	Jeb Burton	Our Motorsports	Chevrolet
30	45	Caesar Bacarella	Alpha Prime Racing	Chevrolet
31	35	Joey Gase	Emerling-Gase Motorsports	Ford
32	38	Kyle Sieg	RSS Racing	Ford
33	78	Matt Mills (i)	B. J. McLeod Motorsports	Chevrolet
Qualified by owner's points
34	34	Jesse Iwuji	Jesse Iwuji Motorsports	Chevrolet
35	5	Patrick Emerling	B. J. McLeod Motorsports	Ford
36	6	Ryan Vargas	JD Motorsports	Chevrolet
37	13	Timmy Hill (i)	MBM Motorsports	Chevrolet
Past-winner provisional
38	14	Justin Haley (i)	Kaulig Racing	Chevrolet
Failed to qualify
39	92	Josh Williams	DGM Racing	Chevrolet
40	47	Tim Viens (i)	Mike Harmon Racing	Chevrolet
41	28	C. J. McLaughlin	RSS Racing	Ford
42	24	Joe Nemechek	Sam Hunt Racing	Toyota
43	77	Ronnie Bassett Jr.	Bassett Racing	Chevrolet
Official starting lineup

== Race results ==
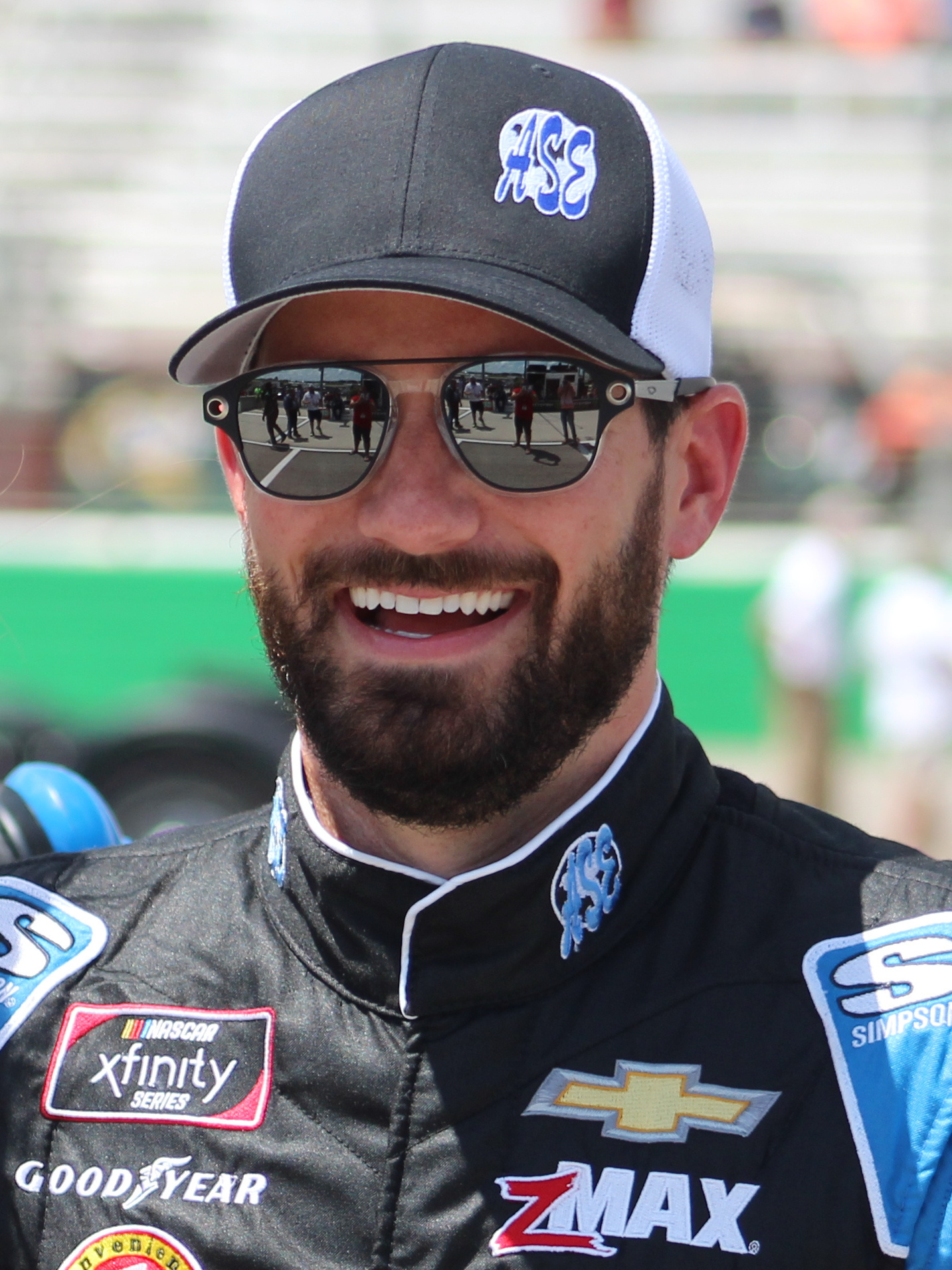
Jeremy Clements would win the race after leading when the final caution came out on the last lap.

Stage 1 Laps: 30

Pos.	#	Driver	Team	Make	Pts
1	54	Ty Gibbs	Joe Gibbs Racing	Toyota	10
2	21	Austin Hill (R)	Richard Childress Racing	Chevrolet	9
3	2	Sheldon Creed (R)	Richard Childress Racing	Chevrolet	8
4	16	A. J. Allmendinger	Kaulig Racing	Chevrolet	7
5	8	Josh Berry	JR Motorsports	Chevrolet	6
6	19	Brandon Jones	Joe Gibbs Racing	Toyota	5
7	7	Justin Allgaier	JR Motorsports	Chevrolet	4
8	1	Sam Mayer	JR Motorsports	Chevrolet	3
9	14	Justin Haley (i)	Kaulig Racing	Chevrolet	0
10	39	Ryan Sieg	RSS Racing	Ford	1

Stage 2 Laps: 30

Pos.	#	Driver	Team	Make	Pts
1	9	Noah Gragson	JR Motorsports	Chevrolet	10
2	23	Anthony Alfredo	Our Motorsports	Chevrolet	9
3	98	Riley Herbst	Stewart-Haas Racing	Ford	8
4	1	Sam Mayer	JR Motorsports	Chevrolet	7
5	8	Josh Berry	JR Motorsports	Chevrolet	6
6	26	John Hunter Nemechek (i)	Sam Hunt Racing	Toyota	0
7	54	Ty Gibbs	Joe Gibbs Racing	Toyota	4
8	7	Justin Allgaier	JR Motorsports	Chevrolet	3
9	31	Myatt Snider	Jordan Anderson Racing	Chevrolet	2
10	39	Ryan Sieg	RSS Racing	Ford	1

Stage 3 Laps: 58*

Fin.	St	#	Driver	Team	Make	Laps	Led	Status	Pts
1	9	51	Jeremy Clements	Jeremy Clements Racing	Chevrolet	118	3	Running	40
2	37	13	Timmy Hill (i)	MBM Motorsports	Chevrolet	118	0	Running	0
3	1	16	A. J. Allmendinger	Kaulig Racing	Chevrolet	118	4	Running	41
4	25	68	Brandon Brown	Brandonbilt Motorsports	Chevrolet	118	1	Running	33
5	24	44	Sage Karam	Alpha Prime Racing	Chevrolet	118	0	Running	32
6	36	6	Ryan Vargas	JD Motorsports	Chevrolet	118	1	Running	31
7	8	54	Ty Gibbs	Joe Gibbs Racing	Toyota	118	11	Running	44
8	21	36	Alex Labbé	DGM Racing	Chevrolet	118	0	Running	29
9	28	66	J. J. Yeley	MBM Motorsports	Chevrolet	118	0	Running	28
10	32	38	Kyle Sieg	RSS Racing	Ford	118	0	Running	27
11	34	34	Jesse Iwuji	Jesse Iwuji Motorsports	Chevrolet	118	0	Running	26
12	22	31	Myatt Snider	Jordan Anderson Racing	Chevrolet	118	0	Running	27
13	15	7	Justin Allgaier	JR Motorsports	Chevrolet	118	11	Running	31
14	14	21	Austin Hill (R)	Richard Childress Racing	Chevrolet	118	18	Running	32
15	6	98	Riley Herbst	Stewart-Haas Racing	Ford	118	2	Running	30
16	31	35	Joey Gase	Emerling-Gase Motorsports	Ford	116	0	Running	21
17	18	02	Blaine Perkins (i)	Our Motorsports	Chevrolet	116	0	Running	0
18	5	8	Josh Berry	JR Motorsports	Chevrolet	115	6	Running	31
19	16	11	Daniel Hemric	Kaulig Racing	Chevrolet	114	1	DVP	18
20	12	19	Brandon Jones	Joe Gibbs Racing	Toyota	114	0	Running	22
21	29	27	Jeb Burton	Our Motorsports	Chevrolet	113	0	Running	16
22	2	9	Noah Gragson	JR Motorsports	Chevrolet	110	52	Accident	25
23	10	10	Landon Cassill	Kaulig Racing	Chevrolet	110	0	Accident	14
24	33	78	Matt Mills (i)	B. J. McLeod Motorsports	Chevrolet	110	0	Accident	0
25	38	14	Justin Haley (i)	Kaulig Racing	Chevrolet	103	0	Accident	0
26	11	39	Ryan Sieg	RSS Racing	Ford	103	0	Accident	13
27	17	48	Ricky Stenhouse Jr. (i)	Big Machine Racing	Chevrolet	103	0	Accident	0
28	30	45	Caesar Bacarella	Alpha Prime Racing	Chevrolet	103	0	Accident	9
29	35	5	Josh Williams	B. J. McLeod Motorsports	Ford	103	0	Accident	8
30	23	4	Bayley Currey	JD Motorsports	Chevrolet	103	0	Accident	7
31	26	08	David Starr	SS-Green Light Racing	Ford	98	0	Accident	6
32	13	23	Anthony Alfredo	Our Motorsports	Chevrolet	98	8	Accident	14
33	27	91	Mason Massey	DGM Racing	Chevrolet	97	0	Engine	4
34	4	1	Sam Mayer	JR Motorsports	Chevrolet	91	0	Accident	13
35	19	26	John Hunter Nemechek (i)	Sam Hunt Racing	Toyota	82	0	Accident	0
36	7	2	Sheldon Creed (R)	Richard Childress Racing	Chevrolet	82	0	Accident	9
37	20	07	Joe Graf Jr.	SS-Green Light Racing	Ford	82	0	Accident	1
38	3	18	Sammy Smith	Joe Gibbs Racing	Toyota	14	0	Accident	1
Official race results

== Standings after the race ==
Drivers' Championship standings

Pos	Driver	Points
1	A. J. Allmendinger	928
2	Ty Gibbs	870 (-58)
3	Justin Allgaier	848 (-80)
4	Noah Gragson	813 (-115)
5	Josh Berry	800 (-128)
6	Austin Hill	703 (-225)
7	Brandon Jones	669 (-259)
8	Riley Herbst	643 (-285)
9	Sam Mayer	622 (-306)
10	Daniel Hemric	569 (-359)
11	Landon Cassill	548 (-380)
12	Ryan Sieg	536 (-392)
Official driver's standings

- Note: Only the first 12 positions are included for the driver standings.

Previous race: 2022 Sunoco Go Rewards 200 at The Glen	NASCAR Xfinity Series; 2022 season	Next race: 2022 Sport Clips Haircuts VFW 200
