= 2023 Beef. It's What's for Dinner. 300 =

1st race of the 2023 NASCAR Xfinity Series

Race details
- Race 1 of 33 of the 2023 NASCAR Xfinity Series
- Date: February 18, 2023
- Official name: 42nd Annual Beef. It's What's for Dinner. 300
- Location: Daytona International Speedway, Daytona Beach, Florida
- Course: Permanent racing facility
- Course length: 2.5 miles (4.0 km)
- Distance: 125 laps, 312 mi (502 km)
- Scheduled distance: 120 laps, 300 mi (480 km)
- Average speed: 132.524 mph (213.277 km/h)

Pole position
Driver	Austin Hill	Richard Childress Racing
- Time: 49.298

Most laps led
Driver	Austin Hill	Richard Childress Racing
- Laps: 39

Winner
No. 21	Austin Hill	Richard Childress Racing

Television in the United States
- Network: FS1
- Announcers: Adam Alexander, Austin Dillon, and Ryan Blaney

Radio in the United States
- Radio: MRN

The 2023 Beef. It's What's for Dinner. 300 was the 1st stock car race of the 2023 NASCAR Xfinity Series, and the 42nd iteration of the event. The race was held on Saturday, February 18, 2023, in Daytona Beach, Florida, at Daytona International Speedway, a 2.5 miles (4.0 km) permanent tri-oval shaped superspeedway. The race was scheduled to be contested over 120 laps, but due to a NASCAR overtime finish, it was increased to 125 laps. Austin Hill, driving for Richard Childress Racing, would win the race after leading when the final caution came out on the last lap. This was Hill's third career NASCAR Xfinity Series win, and his first of the season. Hill would dominate the race as well, leading 39 laps. To fill out the podium, John Hunter Nemechek, driving for Joe Gibbs Racing, and Justin Allgaier, driving for JR Motorsports, would finish 2nd and 3rd, respectively.

== Background ==
Daytona International Speedway is one of three superspeedways to hold NASCAR races, the other two being Atlanta Motor Speedway and Talladega Superspeedway. The standard track at Daytona International Speedway is a four-turn superspeedway that is 2.5 miles (4.0 km) long. The track's turns are banked at 31 degrees, while the front stretch, the location of the finish line, is banked at 18 degrees.

=== Entry list ===
- (R) denotes rookie driver.
- (i) denotes a driver who is ineligible for series driver points.

#	Driver	Team	Make
00	Cole Custer	Stewart-Haas Racing	Ford
1	Sam Mayer	JR Motorsports	Chevrolet
02	David Starr	Our Motorsports	Chevrolet
2	Sheldon Creed	Richard Childress Racing	Chevrolet
4	Bayley Currey	JD Motorsports	Chevrolet
5	Jade Buford	Big Machine Racing	Chevrolet
6	Brennan Poole	JD Motorsports	Chevrolet
07	Blaine Perkins (R)	SS-Green Light Racing	Chevrolet
7	Justin Allgaier	JR Motorsports	Chevrolet
08	Gray Gaulding	SS-Green Light Racing	Chevrolet
8	Josh Berry	JR Motorsports	Chevrolet
9	Brandon Jones	JR Motorsports	Chevrolet
10	Justin Haley (i)	Kaulig Racing	Chevrolet
11	Daniel Hemric	Kaulig Racing	Chevrolet
13	Timmy Hill (i)	MBM Motorsports	Ford
16	Chandler Smith (R)	Kaulig Racing	Chevrolet
18	Sammy Smith (R)	Joe Gibbs Racing	Toyota
19	Myatt Snider	Joe Gibbs Racing	Toyota
20	John Hunter Nemechek	Joe Gibbs Racing	Toyota
21	Austin Hill	Richard Childress Racing	Chevrolet
24	Parker Chase	Sam Hunt Racing	Toyota
25	Brett Moffitt	AM Racing	Ford
26	Kaz Grala	Sam Hunt Racing	Toyota
27	Jeb Burton	Jordan Anderson Racing	Chevrolet
28	Kyle Sieg	RSS Racing	Ford
31	Parker Retzlaff (R)	Jordan Anderson Racing	Chevrolet
34	Jesse Iwuji	Jesse Iwuji Motorsports	Chevrolet
35	C. J. McLaughlin	Emerling-Gase Motorsports	Ford
36	Alex Labbé	DGM Racing	Chevrolet
38	Ryan Sieg	RSS Racing	Ford
39	Joe Graf Jr.	RSS Racing	Ford
43	Ryan Ellis	Alpha Prime Racing	Chevrolet
44	Jeffrey Earnhardt	Alpha Prime Racing	Chevrolet
45	Caesar Bacarella	Alpha Prime Racing	Chevrolet
48	Parker Kligerman	Big Machine Racing	Chevrolet
51	Jeremy Clements	Jeremy Clements Racing	Chevrolet
53	Joey Gase	Emerling-Gase Motorsports	Ford
66	Dexter Stacey	MBM Motorsports	Chevrolet
74	Ryan Vargas	CHK Racing	Chevrolet
78	Anthony Alfredo	B. J. McLeod Motorsports	Chevrolet
91	Josh Bilicki (i)	DGM Racing	Chevrolet
92	Josh Williams	DGM Racing	Chevrolet
98	Riley Herbst	Stewart-Haas Racing	Ford
99	Garrett Smithley	B. J. McLeod Motorsports	Chevrolet
Official entry list

== Practice ==
The first and only practice session was held on Friday, February 17, at 4:35 PM EST, and would last for 50 minutes. Myatt Snider, driving for Joe Gibbs Racing, would set the fastest time in the session, with a lap of 47.965, and an average speed of 187.637 mph (301.972 km/h).

Pos.	#	Driver	Team	Make	Time	Speed
1	19	Myatt Snider	Joe Gibbs Racing	Toyota	47.965	187.637
2	9	Brandon Jones	JR Motorsports	Chevrolet	48.018	187.430
3	7	Justin Allgaier	JR Motorsports	Chevrolet	48.018	187.430
Full practice results

== Qualifying ==
Qualifying was held on Saturday, February 18, at 11:30 AM EST. Since Daytona International Speedway is a superspeedway, the qualifying system used is a single-car, single-lap system with two rounds. In the first round, drivers have one lap to set a time. The fastest ten drivers from the first round move on to the second round. Whoever sets the fastest time in Round 2 wins the pole.

Austin Hill, driving for Richard Childress Racing, would win the pole after advancing from the preliminary round and setting the fastest lap in Round 2, with a lap of 49.298, and an average speed of 182.563 mph (293.807 km/h).

Six drivers would fail to qualify: Dexter Stacey, Josh Bilicki, Garrett Smithley, Timmy Hill, Ryan Vargas, and Alex Labbé.

Pos.	#	Driver	Team	Make	Time (R1)	Speed (R1)	Time (R2)	Speed (R2)
1	21	Austin Hill	Richard Childress Racing	Chevrolet	49.282	182.622	49.298	182.563
2	48	Parker Kligerman	Big Machine Racing	Chevrolet	49.398	182.194	49.331	182.441
3	00	Cole Custer	Stewart-Haas Racing	Ford	49.628	181.349	49.364	182.319
4	2	Sheldon Creed	Richard Childress Racing	Chevrolet	49.478	181.899	49.392	182.216
5	7	Justin Allgaier	JR Motorsports	Chevrolet	49.591	181.485	49.394	182.208
6	11	Daniel Hemric	Kaulig Racing	Chevrolet	49.375	182.278	49.511	181.778
7	20	John Hunter Nemechek	Joe Gibbs Racing	Toyota	49.643	181.294	49.542	181.664
8	16	Chandler Smith (R)	Kaulig Racing	Chevrolet	49.570	181.561	49.560	181.598
9	98	Riley Herbst	Stewart-Haas Racing	Ford	49.511	181.778	49.654	181.254
10	78	Anthony Alfredo	B. J. McLeod Motorsports	Chevrolet	49.433	182.065	49.705	181.068
Eliminated in Round 1
11	9	Brandon Jones	JR Motorsports	Chevrolet	49.644	181.291	—	—
12	5	Jade Buford	Big Machine Racing	Chevrolet	49.649	181.273	—	—
13	19	Myatt Snider	Joe Gibbs Racing	Toyota	49.682	181.152	—	—
14	1	Sam Mayer	JR Motorsports	Chevrolet	49.690	181.123	—	—
15	18	Sammy Smith (R)	Joe Gibbs Racing	Toyota	49.711	181.046	—	—
16	31	Parker Retzlaff (R)	Jordan Anderson Racing	Chevrolet	49.756	180.883	—	—
17	45	Caesar Bacarella	Alpha Prime Racing	Chevrolet	49.758	180.875	—	—
18	8	Josh Berry	JR Motorsports	Chevrolet	49.764	180.854	—	—
19	10	Justin Haley (i)	Kaulig Racing	Chevrolet	49.817	180.661	—	—
20	27	Jeb Burton	Jordan Anderson Racing	Chevrolet	49.861	180.502	—	—
21	6	Brennan Poole	JD Motorsports	Chevrolet	49.968	180.115	—	—
22	38	Ryan Sieg	RSS Racing	Ford	49.997	180.011	—	—
23	08	Gray Gaulding	SS-Green Light Racing	Chevrolet	50.079	179.716	—	—
24	44	Jeffrey Earnhardt	Alpha Prime Racing	Chevrolet	50.115	179.587	—	—
25	92	Josh Williams	DGM Racing	Chevrolet	50.196	179.297	—	—
26	28	Kyle Sieg	RSS Racing	Ford	50.198	179.290	—	—
27	07	Blaine Perkins (R)	SS-Green Light Racing	Chevrolet	50.221	179.208	—	—
28	02	David Starr	Our Motorsports	Chevrolet	50.228	179.183	—	—
29	39	Joe Graf Jr.	RSS Racing	Ford	50.229	179.179	—	—
30	4	Bayley Currey	JD Motorsports	Chevrolet	50.259	179.072	—	—
31	35	C. J. McLaughlin	Emerling-Gase Motorsports	Ford	50.264	179.055	—	—
32	25	Brett Moffitt	AM Racing	Ford	50.265	179.051	—	—
33	26	Kaz Grala	Sam Hunt Racing	Toyota	50.295	178.944	—	—
Qualified by owner's points
34	51	Jeremy Clements	Jeremy Clements Racing	Chevrolet	50.389	178.610	—	—
35	24	Parker Chase	Sam Hunt Racing	Toyota	50.413	178.525	—	—
36	43	Ryan Ellis	Alpha Prime Racing	Chevrolet	50.502	178.211	—	—
37	53	Joey Gase	Emerling-Gase Motorsports	Ford	51.119	176.060	—	—
38	34	Jesse Iwuji	Jesse Iwuji Motorsports	Chevrolet	—	—	—	—
Failed to qualify
39	66	Dexter Stacey	MBM Motorsports	Chevrolet	50.381	178.639	—	—
40	91	Josh Bilicki (i)	DGM Racing	Chevrolet	50.472	178.317	—	—
41	99	Garrett Smithley	B. J. McLeod Motorsports	Chevrolet	50.662	177.648	—	—
42	13	Timmy Hill (i)	MBM Motorsports	Toyota	50.921	176.744	—	—
43	74	Ryan Vargas	CHK Racing	Chevrolet	—	—	—	—
44	36	Alex Labbé	DGM Racing	Chevrolet	—	—	—	—
Official qualifying results
Official starting lineup

== Race results ==
Stage 1 Laps: 30

Pos.	#	Driver	Team	Make	Pts
1	21	Austin Hill	Richard Childress Racing	Chevrolet	10
2	16	Chandler Smith (R)	Kaulig Racing	Chevrolet	9
3	7	Justin Allgaier	JR Motorsports	Chevrolet	8
4	10	Justin Haley (i)	Kaulig Racing	Chevrolet	0
5	27	Jeb Burton	Jordan Anderson Racing	Chevrolet	6
6	2	Sheldon Creed	Richard Childress Racing	Chevrolet	5
7	8	Josh Berry	JR Motorsports	Chevrolet	4
8	48	Parker Kligerman	Big Machine Racing	Chevrolet	3
9	20	John Hunter Nemechek	Joe Gibbs Racing	Toyota	2
10	19	Myatt Snider	Joe Gibbs Racing	Toyota	1

Stage 2 Laps: 30

Pos.	#	Driver	Team	Make	Pts
1	7	Justin Allgaier	JR Motorsports	Chevrolet	10
2	1	Sam Mayer	JR Motorsports	Chevrolet	9
3	21	Austin Hill	Richard Childress Racing	Chevrolet	8
4	9	Brandon Jones	JR Motorsports	Chevrolet	7
5	25	Brett Moffitt	AM Racing	Ford	6
6	8	Josh Berry	JR Motorsports	Chevrolet	5
7	98	Riley Herbst	Stewart-Haas Racing	Ford	4
8	20	John Hunter Nemechek	Joe Gibbs Racing	Toyota	3
9	00	Cole Custer	Stewart-Haas Racing	Ford	2
10	27	Jeb Burton	Jordan Anderson Racing	Chevrolet	1

Stage 3 Laps: 65

Fin	St	#	Driver	Team	Make	Laps	Led	Status	Pts
1	1	21	Austin Hill	Richard Childress Racing	Chevrolet	125	39	Running	58
2	7	20	John Hunter Nemechek	Joe Gibbs Racing	Toyota	125	8	Running	40
3	5	7	Justin Allgaier	JR Motorsports	Chevrolet	125	36	Running	52
4	16	31	Parker Retzlaff (R)	Jordan Anderson Racing	Chevrolet	125	0	Running	33
5	13	19	Myatt Snider	Joe Gibbs Racing	Toyota	125	0	Running	33
6	9	98	Riley Herbst	Stewart-Haas Racing	Ford	125	0	Running	35
7	29	39	Joe Graf Jr.	RSS Racing	Ford	125	0	Running	30
8	22	38	Ryan Sieg	RSS Racing	Ford	125	0	Running	29
9	3	00	Cole Custer	Stewart-Haas Racing	Ford	125	1	Running	30
10	19	10	Justin Haley (i)	Kaulig Racing	Chevrolet	125	1	Running	0
11	20	27	Jeb Burton	Jordan Anderson Racing	Chevrolet	125	0	Running	33
12	8	16	Chandler Smith (R)	Kaulig Racing	Chevrolet	125	0	Running	34
13	17	45	Stefan Parsons (Note: Caesar Bacarella suffered from stomach issues after qualifying and was replaced by Stefan Parsons.)	Alpha Prime Racing	Chevrolet	125	0	Running	24
14	11	9	Brandon Jones	JR Motorsports	Chevrolet	125	0	Running	30
15	25	92	Josh Williams	DGM Racing	Chevrolet	125	0	Running	22
16	34	24	Parker Chase	Sam Hunt Racing	Toyota	125	0	Running	21
17	38	51	Jeremy Clements	Jeremy Clements Racing	Chevrolet	125	0	Running	20
18	36	53	Joey Gase	Emerling-Gase Motorsports	Ford	125	0	Running	19
19	15	18	Sammy Smith (R)	Joe Gibbs Racing	Toyota	125	0	Running	18
20	23	08	Gray Gaulding	SS-Green Light Racing	Chevrolet	125	1	Running	17
21	26	28	Kyle Sieg	RSS Racing	Ford	125	0	Running	16
22	28	02	David Starr	Our Motorsports	Chevrolet	125	2	Running	15
23	2	48	Parker Kligerman	Big Machine Racing	Chevrolet	125	1	Running	17
24	10	78	Anthony Alfredo	B. J. McLeod Motorsports	Chevrolet	125	0	Running	13
25	12	5	Jade Buford	Big Machine Racing	Chevrolet	125	0	Running	12
26	18	8	Josh Berry	JR Motorsports	Chevrolet	125	17	Running	20
27	14	1	Sam Mayer	JR Motorsports	Chevrolet	124	14	Accident	19
28	24	44	Jeffrey Earnhardt	Alpha Prime Racing	Chevrolet	124	0	Running	9
29	32	25	Brett Moffitt	AM Racing	Ford	124	0	Running	14
30	37	34	Jesse Iwuji	Jesse Iwuji Motorsports	Chevrolet	110	0	Electrical	7
31	31	35	C. J. McLaughlin	Emerling-Gase Motorsports	Ford	87	0	Accident	6
32	33	26	Kaz Grala	Sam Hunt Racing	Toyota	82	0	Engine	5
33	21	6	Brennan Poole	JD Motorsports	Chevrolet	81	0	Engine	4
34	4	2	Sheldon Creed	Richard Childress Racing	Chevrolet	41	5	Accident	8
35	35	43	Ryan Ellis	Alpha Prime Racing	Chevrolet	41	0	Accident	2
36	6	11	Daniel Hemric	Kaulig Racing	Chevrolet	20	0	Accident	1
37	27	07	Blaine Perkins (R)	SS-Green Light Racing	Chevrolet	19	0	Accident	1
38	30	4	Bayley Currey	JD Motorsports	Chevrolet	8	0	Engine	1
Official race results

== Standings after the race ==
Drivers' Championship standings

Pos	Driver	Points
1	Austin Hill	58
2	Justin Allgaier	52 (–6)
3	John Hunter Nemechek	40 (–18)
4	Riley Herbst	35 (–23)
5	Chandler Smith	34 (–24)
6	Parker Retzlaff	33 (–25)
7	Myatt Snider	33 (–25)
8	Jeb Burton	33 (–25)
9	Joe Graf Jr.	30 (–28)
10	Cole Custer	30 (–28)
11	Brandon Jones	30 (–28)
12	Ryan Sieg	29 (–29)
Official driver's standings

- Note: Only the first 12 positions are included for the driver standings.

Previous race: 2022 NASCAR Xfinity Series Championship Race	NASCAR Xfinity Series; 2023 season	Next race: 2023 Production Alliance Group 300
