= 2022 Andy's Frozen Custard 300 =

27th race of the 2022 NASCAR Xfinity Series

Race details
- Race 27 of 33 of the 2022 NASCAR Xfinity Series
- Date: September 24, 2022
- Official name: 18th Annual Andy's Frozen Custard 300
- Location: Texas Motor Speedway, Fort Worth, Texas
- Course: Permanent racing facility
- Course length: 1.5 miles (2.4 km)
- Distance: 200 laps, 300 mi (480 km)
- Scheduled distance: 200 laps, 300 mi (480 km)
- Average speed: 113.672 mph (182.937 km/h)

Pole position
Driver	Brandon Jones	Joe Gibbs Racing
- Time: 29.089

Most laps led
Driver	Noah Gragson	JR Motorsports
- Laps: 85

Winner
No. 9	Noah Gragson	JR Motorsports

Television in the United States
- Network: USA Network
- Announcers: Rick Allen, Jeff Burton and Brad Daugherty

Radio in the United States
- Radio: Performance Racing Network

The 2022 Andy's Frozen Custard 300 was the 27th stock car race of the 2022 NASCAR Xfinity Series, the first race of the Round of 12, and the 18th iteration of the event. The race was held on Saturday, September 24, 2022, in Fort Worth, Texas at Texas Motor Speedway, a 1.5 miles (2.4 km) permanent tri-oval shaped racetrack. The race took the scheduled 200 laps to complete. Noah Gragson, driving for JR Motorsports, dominated a majority of the race, and scored his 12th career NASCAR Xfinity Series win, his fourth consecutive win, along with his seventh of the season. To fill out the podium, Austin Hill, driving for Richard Childress Racing, and Ty Gibbs, driving for Joe Gibbs Racing, would finish 2nd and 3rd, respectively.

With Gragson's win, he is now tied with Sam Ard with the all-time record for most consecutive wins.

== Background ==
Texas Motor Speedway is a speedway located in the northernmost portion of the U.S. city of Fort Worth, Texas – the portion located in Denton County, Texas. The reconfigured track measures 1.500 mi (2.414 km) with banked 20° in turns 1 and 2 and banked 24° in turns 3 and 4. Texas Motor Speedway is a quad-oval design, where the front straightaway juts outward slightly. The track layout is similar to Atlanta Motor Speedway and Charlotte Motor Speedway. The track is owned by Speedway Motorsports, Inc. Nicknamed “The Great American Speedway“ the racetrack facility is one of the largest motorsports venues in the world capable of hosting crowds in excess of 200,000 spectators.

=== Entry list ===
- (R) denotes rookie driver.
- (i) denotes driver who are ineligible for series driver points.

#	Driver	Team	Make
1	Sam Mayer	JR Motorsports	Chevrolet
02	Parker Retzlaff	Our Motorsports	Chevrolet
2	Sheldon Creed (R)	Richard Childress Racing	Chevrolet
4	Bayley Currey	JD Motorsports	Chevrolet
5	Matt Mills (i)	B. J. McLeod Motorsports	Chevrolet
6	Brennan Poole (i)	JD Motorsports	Chevrolet
07	Joe Graf Jr.	SS-Green Light Racing	Ford
7	Justin Allgaier	JR Motorsports	Chevrolet
08	David Starr	SS-Green Light Racing	Ford
8	Josh Berry	JR Motorsports	Chevrolet
9	Noah Gragson	JR Motorsports	Chevrolet
10	Landon Cassill	Kaulig Racing	Chevrolet
11	Daniel Hemric	Kaulig Racing	Chevrolet
13	Akinori Ogata (i)	MBM Motorsports	Toyota
16	A. J. Allmendinger	Kaulig Racing	Chevrolet
18	John Hunter Nemechek (i)	Joe Gibbs Racing	Toyota
19	Brandon Jones	Joe Gibbs Racing	Toyota
21	Austin Hill (R)	Richard Childress Racing	Chevrolet
23	Anthony Alfredo	Our Motorsports	Chevrolet
26	Jeffrey Earnhardt	Sam Hunt Racing	Toyota
27	Jeb Burton	Our Motorsports	Chevrolet
31	Myatt Snider	Jordan Anderson Racing	Chevrolet
34	Kyle Weatherman	Jesse Iwuji Motorsports	Chevrolet
35	Joey Gase	Emerling-Gase Motorsports	Toyota
36	Josh Williams	DGM Racing	Chevrolet
38	C. J. McLaughlin	RSS Racing	Ford
39	Ryan Sieg	RSS Racing	Ford
44	Tommy Joe Martins	Alpha Prime Racing	Chevrolet
45	Stefan Parsons (i)	Alpha Prime Racing	Chevrolet
48	Nick Sanchez	Big Machine Racing	Chevrolet
51	Jeremy Clements	Jeremy Clements Racing	Chevrolet
54	Ty Gibbs	Joe Gibbs Racing	Toyota
66	J. J. Yeley	MBM Motorsports	Ford
68	Brandon Brown	Brandonbilt Motorsports	Chevrolet
78	Garrett Smithley	B. J. McLeod Motorsports	Chevrolet
91	Mason Massey	DGM Racing	Chevrolet
92	Alex Labbé	DGM Racing	Chevrolet
98	Riley Herbst	Stewart-Haas Racing	Ford
Official entry list

== Practice ==
The only 20-minute practice session was held on Saturday, September 24, at 9:30 AM CST. A. J. Allmendinger, driving for Kaulig Racing, was the fastest in the session, with a lap of 29.664, and an average speed of 182.039 mph (292.963 km/h).

Pos.	#	Driver	Team	Make	Time	Speed
1	16	A. J. Allmendinger	Kaulig Racing	Chevrolet	29.664	182.039
2	11	Daniel Hemric	Kaulig Racing	Chevrolet	29.673	181.984
3	21	Austin Hill (R)	Richard Childress Racing	Chevrolet	29.852	181.892
Full practice results

== Qualifying ==
Qualifying was held on Saturday, September 24, at 10:00 AM CST. Since Texas Motor Speedway is a tri-oval track, the qualifying system used is a single-car, one-lap system with only one round. Whoever sets the fastest time in the round wins the pole. Brandon Jones, driving for Joe Gibbs Racing, scored the pole for the race, with a lap of 29.089, and an average speed of 185.637 mph (298.754 km/h).

Pos.	#	Driver	Team	Make	Time	Speed
1	19	Brandon Jones	Joe Gibbs Racing	Toyota	29.089	185.637
2	9	Noah Gragson	JR Motorsports	Chevrolet	29.132	185.363
3	11	Daniel Hemric	Kaulig Racing	Chevrolet	29.137	185.331
4	18	John Hunter Nemechek (i)	Joe Gibbs Racing	Toyota	29.139	185.319
5	1	Sam Mayer	JR Motorsports	Chevrolet	29.164	185.160
6	7	Justin Allgaier	JR Motorsports	Chevrolet	29.185	185.027
7	16	A. J. Allmendinger	Kaulig Racing	Chevrolet	29.204	184.906
8	54	Ty Gibbs	Joe Gibbs Racing	Toyota	29.212	184.856
9	21	Austin Hill (R)	Richard Childress Racing	Chevrolet	29.280	184.426
10	51	Jeremy Clements	Jeremy Clements Racing	Chevrolet	29.388	183.748
11	98	Riley Herbst	Stewart-Haas Racing	Ford	29.407	183.630
12	10	Landon Cassill	Kaulig Racing	Chevrolet	29.582	182.543
13	2	Sheldon Creed (R)	Richard Childress Racing	Chevrolet	29.603	182.414
14	39	Ryan Sieg	RSS Racing	Ford	29.613	182.352
15	34	Kyle Weatherman	Jesse Iwuji Motorsports	Chevrolet	29.639	182.192
16	8	Josh Berry	JR Motorsports	Chevrolet	29.676	181.965
17	27	Jeb Burton	Our Motorsports	Chevrolet	29.759	181.458
18	4	Bayley Currey	JD Motorsports	Chevrolet	29.770	181.391
19	07	Joe Graf Jr.	SS-Green Light Racing	Ford	29.784	181.305
20	48	Nick Sanchez	Big Machine Racing	Chevrolet	29.831	181.020
21	6	Brennan Poole (i)	JD Motorsports	Chevrolet	29.871	180.777
22	68	Brandon Brown	Brandonbilt Motorsports	Chevrolet	29.919	180.487
23	02	Parker Retzlaff	Our Motorsports	Chevrolet	29.920	180.481
24	45	Stefan Parsons (i)	Alpha Prime Racing	Chevrolet	29.986	180.084
25	23	Anthony Alfredo	Our Motorsports	Chevrolet	30.012	179.928
26	92	Alex Labbé	DGM Racing	Chevrolet	30.122	179.271
27	26	Jeffrey Earnhardt	Sam Hunt Racing	Toyota	30.166	179.009
28	66	J. J. Yeley	MBM Motorsports	Ford	30.205	178.778
29	44	Tommy Joe Martins	Alpha Prime Racing	Chevrolet	30.274	178.371
30	36	Josh Williams	DGM Racing	Chevrolet	30.318	178.112
31	31	Myatt Snider	Jordan Anderson Racing	Chevrolet	30.351	177.918
32	5	Matt Mills (i)	B. J. McLeod Motorsports	Chevrolet	30.402	177.620
33	91	Mason Massey	DGM Racing	Chevrolet	30.439	177.404
Qualified by owner's points
34	08	David Starr	SS-Green Light Racing	Ford	30.451	177.334
35	38	C. J. McLaughlin	RSS Racing	Ford	30.599	176.476
36	35	Joey Gase	Emerling-Gase Motorsports	Toyota	30.664	176.102
37	78	Garrett Smithley	B. J. McLeod Motorsports	Chevrolet	-	-
38	13	Akinori Ogata (i)	MBM Motorsports	Toyota	-	-
Official qualifying results
Official starting lineup

== Race results ==
Stage 1 Laps: 45

Pos.	#	Driver	Team	Make	Pts
1	11	Daniel Hemric	Kaulig Racing	Chevrolet	10
2	7	Justin Allgaier	JR Motorsports	Chevrolet	9
3	21	Austin Hill (R)	Richard Childress Racing	Chevrolet	8
4	9	Noah Gragson	JR Motorsports	Chevrolet	7
5	16	A. J. Allmendinger	Kaulig Racing	Chevrolet	6
6	8	Josh Berry	JR Motorsports	Chevrolet	5
7	18	John Hunter Nemechek (i)	Joe Gibbs Racing	Toyota	0
8	39	Ryan Sieg	RSS Racing	Ford	3
9	54	Ty Gibbs	Joe Gibbs Racing	Toyota	2
10	34	Kyle Weatherman	Jesse Iwuji Motorsports	Chevrolet	1

Stage 2 Laps: 45

Pos.	#	Driver	Team	Make	Pts
1	16	A. J. Allmendinger	Kaulig Racing	Chevrolet	10
2	9	Noah Gragson	JR Motorsports	Chevrolet	9
3	18	John Hunter Nemechek (i)	Joe Gibbs Racing	Toyota	0
4	11	Daniel Hemric	Kaulig Racing	Chevrolet	7
5	54	Ty Gibbs	Joe Gibbs Racing	Toyota	6
6	21	Austin Hill (R)	Richard Childress Racing	Chevrolet	5
7	7	Justin Allgaier	JR Motorsports	Chevrolet	4
8	39	Ryan Sieg	RSS Racing	Ford	3
9	19	Brandon Jones	Joe Gibbs Racing	Toyota	2
10	1	Sam Mayer	JR Motorsports	Chevrolet	1

Stage 3 Laps: 110

Fin.	St	#	Driver	Team	Make	Laps	Led	Status	Pts
1	2	9	Noah Gragson	JR Motorsports	Chevrolet	200	85	Running	56
2	9	21	Austin Hill (R)	Richard Childress Racing	Chevrolet	200	1	Running	48
3	8	54	Ty Gibbs	Joe Gibbs Racing	Toyota	200	3	Running	42
4	7	16	A. J. Allmendinger	Kaulig Racing	Chevrolet	200	34	Running	49
5	11	98	Riley Herbst	Stewart-Haas Racing	Ford	200	0	Running	32
6	16	8	Josh Berry	JR Motorsports	Chevrolet	200	0	Running	36
7	13	2	Sheldon Creed (R)	Richard Childress Racing	Chevrolet	200	0	Running	30
8	5	1	Sam Mayer	JR Motorsports	Chevrolet	200	0	Running	30
9	14	39	Ryan Sieg	RSS Racing	Ford	199	0	Running	34
10	35	38	C. J. McLaughlin	RSS Racing	Ford	199	0	Running	27
11	20	48	Nick Sanchez	Big Machine Racing	Chevrolet	199	0	Running	26
12	18	4	Bayley Currey	JD Motorsports	Chevrolet	199	0	Running	25
13	24	45	Stefan Parsons (i)	Alpha Prime Racing	Chevrolet	199	0	Running	0
14	29	44	Tommy Joe Martins	Alpha Prime Racing	Chevrolet	199	0	Running	23
15	17	27	Jeb Burton	Our Motorsports	Chevrolet	199	5	Running	22
16	32	5	Matt Mills (i)	B. J. McLeod Motorsports	Chevrolet	198	0	Running	0
17	26	92	Alex Labbé	DGM Racing	Chevrolet	197	0	Running	20
18	19	07	Joe Graf Jr.	SS-Green Light Racing	Ford	197	0	Running	19
19	25	23	Anthony Alfredo	Our Motorsports	Chevrolet	197	0	Running	18
20	31	31	Myatt Snider	Jordan Anderson Racing	Chevrolet	196	0	Running	17
21	23	02	Parker Retzlaff	Our Motorsports	Chevrolet	190	0	Running	16
22	15	34	Kyle Weatherman	Jesse Iwuji Motorsports	Chevrolet	141	0	Accident	16
23	37	78	Garrett Smithley	B. J. McLeod Motorsports	Chevrolet	132	0	DVP	14
24	22	68	Brandon Brown	Brandonbilt Motorsports	Chevrolet	131	0	Accident	13
25	36	35	Joey Gase	Emerling-Gase Motorsports	Toyota	120	0	DVP	12
26	30	36	Josh Williams	DGM Racing	Chevrolet	118	0	Accident	11
27	1	19	Brandon Jones	Joe Gibbs Racing	Toyota	117	0	Accident	12
28	4	18	John Hunter Nemechek (i)	Joe Gibbs Racing	Toyota	116	60	Accident	0
29	6	7	Justin Allgaier	JR Motorsports	Chevrolet	116	12	Accident	21
30	3	11	Daniel Hemric	Kaulig Racing	Chevrolet	116	0	Accident	24
31	21	6	Brennan Poole (i)	JD Motorsports	Chevrolet	116	0	Accident	0
32	33	91	Mason Massey	DGM Racing	Chevrolet	116	0	Accident	5
33	12	10	Landon Cassill	Kaulig Racing	Chevrolet	109	0	Accident	4
34	28	66	J. J. Yeley	MBM Motorsports	Ford	99	0	Water Pump	3
35	38	13	Akinori Ogata (i)	MBM Motorsports	Toyota	99	0	Suspension	0
36	10	51	Jeremy Clements	Jeremy Clements Racing	Chevrolet	79	0	Ignition	1
37	34	08	David Starr	SS-Green Light Racing	Ford	77	0	Accident	1
38	27	26	Jeffrey Earnhardt	Sam Hunt Racing	Toyota	17	0	Accident	1
Official race results

== Standings after the race ==
Drivers' Championship standings

	Pos	Driver	Points
	1	Noah Gragson	2,107
2	2	A. J. Allmendinger	2,081 (-26)
1	3	Ty Gibbs	2,080 (-27)
2	4	Austin Hill	2,032 (-43)
	5	Josh Berry	2,058 (-49)
3	6	Justin Allgaier	2,054 (-53)
2	7	Sam Mayer	2,035 (-72)
4	8	Ryan Sieg	2,035 (-72)
2	9	Riley Herbst	2,034 (-73)
	10	Daniel Hemric	2,027 (-80)
4	11	Brandon Jones	2,022 (-85)
4	12	Jeremy Clements	2,006 (-101)
Official driver's standings

- Note: Only the first 12 positions are included for the driver standings.

Previous race: 2022 Food City 300	NASCAR Xfinity Series; 2022 season	Next race: 2022 Sparks 300
