= 2022 Alsco Uniforms 250 =

17th race of the 2022 NASCAR Xfinity Series

Race details
- Race 17 of 33 of the 2022 NASCAR Xfinity Series
- Date: July 9, 2022
- Official name: Second Annual Alsco Uniforms 250
- Location: Atlanta Motor Speedway, Hampton, Georgia
- Course: Permanent racing facility
- Course length: 1.54 miles (2.48 km)
- Distance: 163 laps, 251.02 mi (403.98 km)
- Scheduled distance: 163 laps, 251.02 mi (403.98 km)
- Average speed: 128.071 mph (206.110 km/h)

Pole position
| Driver | Ty Gibbs | Joe Gibbs Racing |
- Grid positions set by competition-based formula

Most laps led
| Driver | Austin Hill | Richard Childress Racing |
- Laps: 73

Winner
| No. 21 | Austin Hill | Richard Childress Racing |

Television in the United States
- Network: USA Network
- Announcers: Rick Allen, Jeff Burton and Dale Earnhardt Jr.

Radio in the United States
- Radio: Performance Racing Network

The 2022 Alsco Uniforms 250 was the 17th stock car race of the 2022 NASCAR Xfinity Series, and the second iteration of the event. The race was held on Saturday, July 9, 2022, in Hampton, Georgia at Atlanta Motor Speedway, a 1.54 miles (2.48 km) permanent tri-oval racetrack. The race took its scheduled 163 laps to complete. Austin Hill, driving for Richard Childress Racing, held off Josh Berry on the final few laps, and earned his second career NASCAR Xfinity Series win, along with his second of the season. Hill would mostly dominate the race as well, leading 73 laps. To fill out the podium, Ryan Truex, driving for Joe Gibbs Racing, would finish in 3rd, respectively.

== Background ==
Atlanta Motor Speedway (formerly known as Atlanta International Raceway from 1960 to 1990) is a 1.54-mile entertainment facility in Hampton, Georgia, United States, 20 miles (32 km) south of Atlanta. It has annually hosted NASCAR Cup Series stock car races since its inauguration in 1960.

The venue was bought by Speedway Motorsports in 1990. In 1994, 46 condominiums were built over the northeastern side of the track. In 1997, to standardize the track with Speedway Motorsports' other two intermediate ovals, the entire track was almost completely rebuilt. The frontstretch and backstretch were swapped, and the configuration of the track was changed from oval to quad-oval, with a new official length of 1.54-mile (2.48 km) where before it was 1.522-mile (2.449 km). The project made the track one of the fastest on the NASCAR circuit. In July 2021 NASCAR announced that the track would be reprofiled for the 2022 season to have 28 degrees (previously 24 degrees) of banking and would be narrowed from 55 to 40 feet which makes racing at the track similar to restrictor plate superspeedways. Despite the reprofiling being criticized by drivers, construction began in August 2021 and wrapped up in December 2021. The track has seating capacity of 71,000 to 125,000 people depending on the tracks configuration.

=== Entry list ===
| # | Driver | Team | Make |
|---|---|---|---|
| 1 | Sam Mayer | JR Motorsports | Chevrolet |
| 02 | Brett Moffitt | Our Motorsports | Chevrolet |
| 2 | Sheldon Creed (R) | Richard Childress Racing | Chevrolet |
| 4 | Bayley Currey | JD Motorsports | Chevrolet |
| 5 | Matt Mills (i) | B. J. McLeod Motorsports | Chevrolet |
| 6 | Ryan Vargas | JD Motorsports | Chevrolet |
| 07 | Joe Graf Jr. | SS-Green Light Racing | Ford |
| 7 | Justin Allgaier | JR Motorsports | Chevrolet |
| 08 | David Starr | SS-Green Light Racing | Ford |
| 8 | Josh Berry | JR Motorsports | Chevrolet |
| 9 | Noah Gragson | JR Motorsports | Chevrolet |
| 10 | Landon Cassill | Kaulig Racing | Chevrolet |
| 11 | Daniel Hemric | Kaulig Racing | Chevrolet |
| 13 | Natalie Decker | MBM Motorsports | Ford |
| 16 | A. J. Allmendinger | Kaulig Racing | Chevrolet |
| 18 | Ryan Truex | Joe Gibbs Racing | Toyota |
| 19 | Brandon Jones | Joe Gibbs Racing | Toyota |
| 21 | Austin Hill (R) | Richard Childress Racing | Chevrolet |
| 23 | Anthony Alfredo | Our Motorsports | Chevrolet |
| 26 | Jeffrey Earnhardt | Sam Hunt Racing | Toyota |
| 27 | Jeb Burton | Our Motorsports | Chevrolet |
| 31 | Myatt Snider | Jordan Anderson Racing | Chevrolet |
| 34 | Jesse Iwuji | Jesse Iwuji Motorsports | Chevrolet |
| 35 | Joey Gase | Emerling-Gase Motorsports | Toyota |
| 36 | Alex Labbé | DGM Racing | Chevrolet |
| 38 | Kyle Sieg | RSS Racing | Ford |
| 39 | Ryan Sieg | RSS Racing | Ford |
| 44 | Sage Karam | Alpha Prime Racing | Chevrolet |
| 45 | Caesar Bacarella | Alpha Prime Racing | Chevrolet |
| 47 | Brennan Poole (i) | Mike Harmon Racing | Chevrolet |
| 48 | Tyler Reddick (i) | Big Machine Racing | Chevrolet |
| 51 | Jeremy Clements | Jeremy Clements Racing | Chevrolet |
| 54 | Ty Gibbs | Joe Gibbs Racing | Toyota |
| 66 | J. J. Yeley | MBM Motorsports | Ford |
| 68 | Brandon Brown | Brandonbilt Motorsports | Chevrolet |
| 78 | Josh Williams | B. J. McLeod Motorsports | Chevrolet |
| 91 | Mason Massey | DGM Racing | Chevrolet |
| 98 | Riley Herbst | Stewart-Haas Racing | Ford |
Official entry list

== Qualifying ==
Qualifying was scheduled to be held on Saturday, July 9, at 9:30 AM EST. Since Atlanta Motor Speedway is an oval track, the qualifying system used is a single-car, single-lap system with only one round. Whoever sets the fastest time in the round wins the pole.

Due to inclement weather, qualifying would be cancelled. The starting lineup would be determined by a performance-based metric system. As a result, Ty Gibbs, driving for Joe Gibbs Racing, would take the pole.

| Pos. | # | Driver | Team | Make |
|---|---|---|---|---|
| 1 | 54 | Ty Gibbs | Joe Gibbs Racing | Toyota |
| 2 | 8 | Josh Berry | JR Motorsports | Chevrolet |
| 3 | 16 | A. J. Allmendinger | Kaulig Racing | Chevrolet |
| 4 | 19 | Brandon Jones | Joe Gibbs Racing | Toyota |
| 5 | 21 | Austin Hill (R) | Richard Childress Racing | Chevrolet |
| 6 | 9 | Noah Gragson | JR Motorsports | Chevrolet |
| 7 | 7 | Justin Allgaier | JR Motorsports | Chevrolet |
| 8 | 98 | Riley Herbst | Stewart-Haas Racing | Ford |
| 9 | 39 | Ryan Sieg | RSS Racing | Ford |
| 10 | 1 | Sam Mayer | JR Motorsports | Chevrolet |
| 11 | 51 | Jeremy Clements | Jeremy Clements Racing | Chevrolet |
| 12 | 36 | Alex Labbé | DGM Racing | Chevrolet |
| 13 | 27 | Jeb Burton | Our Motorsports | Chevrolet |
| 14 | 23 | Anthony Alfredo | Our Motorsports | Chevrolet |
| 15 | 2 | Sheldon Creed (R) | Richard Childress Racing | Chevrolet |
| 16 | 11 | Daniel Hemric | Kaulig Racing | Chevrolet |
| 17 | 4 | Bayley Currey | JD Motorsports | Chevrolet |
| 18 | 10 | Landon Cassill | Kaulig Racing | Chevrolet |
| 19 | 26 | Jeffrey Earnhardt | Sam Hunt Racing | Toyota |
| 20 | 78 | Josh Williams | B. J. McLeod Motorsports | Chevrolet |
| 21 | 18 | Ryan Truex | Joe Gibbs Racing | Toyota |
| 22 | 48 | Tyler Reddick (i) | Big Machine Racing | Chevrolet |
| 23 | 02 | Brett Moffitt | Our Motorsports | Chevrolet |
| 24 | 68 | Brandon Brown | Brandonbilt Motorsports | Chevrolet |
| 25 | 44 | Sage Karam | Alpha Prime Racing | Chevrolet |
| 26 | 31 | Myatt Snider | Jordan Anderson Racing | Chevrolet |
| 27 | 34 | Jesse Iwuji | Jesse Iwuji Motorsports | Chevrolet |
| 28 | 08 | David Starr | SS-Green Light Racing | Ford |
| 29 | 38 | Kyle Sieg | RSS Racing | Ford |
| 30 | 91 | Mason Massey | DGM Racing | Chevrolet |
| 31 | 07 | Joe Graf Jr. | SS-Green Light Racing | Ford |
| 32 | 35 | Joey Gase | Emerling-Gase Motorsports | Ford |
| 33 | 5 | Matt Mills (i) | B. J. McLeod Motorsports | Chevrolet |
Qualified by owner's points
| 34 | 45 | Caesar Bacarella | Alpha Prime Racing | Chevrolet |
| 35 | 66 | J. J. Yeley | MBM Motorsports | Ford |
| 36 | 6 | Ryan Vargas | JD Motorsports | Chevrolet |
| 37 | 13 | Natalie Decker | MBM Motorsports | Ford |
| 38 | 47 | Brennan Poole (i) | Mike Harmon Racing | Chevrolet |
Official starting lineup

== Race results ==
Stage 1 Laps: 40

| Pos. | # | Driver | Team | Make | Pts |
|---|---|---|---|---|---|
| 1 | 8 | Josh Berry | JR Motorsports | Chevrolet | 10 |
| 2 | 54 | Ty Gibbs | Joe Gibbs Racing | Toyota | 9 |
| 3 | 16 | A. J. Allmendinger | Kaulig Racing | Chevrolet | 8 |
| 4 | 68 | Brandon Brown | Brandonbilt Motorsports | Chevrolet | 7 |
| 5 | 9 | Noah Gragson | JR Motorsports | Chevrolet | 6 |
| 6 | 11 | Daniel Hemric | Kaulig Racing | Chevrolet | 5 |
| 7 | 21 | Austin Hill (R) | Richard Childress Racing | Chevrolet | 4 |
| 8 | 7 | Justin Allgaier | JR Motorsports | Chevrolet | 3 |
| 9 | 19 | Brandon Jones | Joe Gibbs Racing | Toyota | 2 |
| 10 | 31 | Myatt Snider | Jordan Anderson Racing | Chevrolet | 1 |

Stage 2 Laps: 40

| Pos. | # | Driver | Team | Make | Pts |
|---|---|---|---|---|---|
| 1 | 21 | Austin Hill (R) | Richard Childress Racing | Chevrolet | 10 |
| 2 | 2 | Sheldon Creed (R) | Richard Childress Racing | Chevrolet | 9 |
| 3 | 68 | Brandon Brown | Brandonbilt Motorsports | Chevrolet | 8 |
| 4 | 48 | Tyler Reddick (i) | Big Machine Racing | Chevrolet | 0 |
| 5 | 7 | Justin Allgaier | JR Motorsports | Chevrolet | 6 |
| 6 | 19 | Brandon Jones | Joe Gibbs Racing | Toyota | 5 |
| 7 | 54 | Ty Gibbs | Joe Gibbs Racing | Toyota | 4 |
| 8 | 18 | Ryan Truex | Joe Gibbs Racing | Toyota | 3 |
| 9 | 10 | Landon Cassill | Kaulig Racing | Chevrolet | 2 |
| 10 | 26 | Jeffrey Earnhardt | Sam Hunt Racing | Toyota | 1 |

Stage 3 Laps: 83

| Fin. | St | # | Driver | Team | Make | Laps | Led | Status | Pts |
|---|---|---|---|---|---|---|---|---|---|
| 1 | 5 | 21 | Austin Hill (R) | Richard Childress Racing | Chevrolet | 163 | 73 | Running | 54 |
| 2 | 2 | 8 | Josh Berry | JR Motorsports | Chevrolet | 163 | 13 | Running | 45 |
| 3 | 21 | 18 | Ryan Truex | Joe Gibbs Racing | Toyota | 163 | 8 | Running | 37 |
| 4 | 22 | 48 | Tyler Reddick (i) | Big Machine Racing | Chevrolet | 163 | 21 | Running | 0 |
| 5 | 16 | 11 | Daniel Hemric | Kaulig Racing | Chevrolet | 163 | 0 | Running | 37 |
| 6 | 6 | 9 | Noah Gragson | JR Motorsports | Chevrolet | 163 | 0 | Running | 37 |
| 7 | 7 | 7 | Justin Allgaier | JR Motorsports | Chevrolet | 163 | 0 | Running | 39 |
| 8 | 18 | 10 | Landon Cassill | Kaulig Racing | Chevrolet | 163 | 0 | Running | 31 |
| 9 | 8 | 98 | Riley Herbst | Stewart-Haas Racing | Ford | 163 | 0 | Running | 28 |
| 10 | 3 | 16 | A. J. Allmendinger | Kaulig Racing | Chevrolet | 163 | 25 | Running | 35 |
| 11 | 4 | 19 | Brandon Jones | Joe Gibbs Racing | Toyota | 163 | 0 | Running | 33 |
| 12 | 15 | 2 | Sheldon Creed (R) | Richard Childress Racing | Chevrolet | 163 | 16 | Running | 34 |
| 13 | 13 | 27 | Jeb Burton | Our Motorsports | Chevrolet | 163 | 0 | Running | 24 |
| 14 | 14 | 23 | Anthony Alfredo | Our Motorsports | Chevrolet | 163 | 0 | Running | 23 |
| 15 | 9 | 39 | Ryan Sieg | RSS Racing | Ford | 163 | 0 | Running | 22 |
| 16 | 29 | 38 | Kyle Sieg | RSS Racing | Ford | 163 | 0 | Running | 21 |
| 17 | 11 | 51 | Jeremy Clements | Jeremy Clements Racing | Chevrolet | 163 | 0 | Running | 20 |
| 18 | 26 | 31 | Myatt Snider | Jordan Anderson Racing | Chevrolet | 163 | 0 | Running | 20 |
| 19 | 19 | 26 | Jeffrey Earnhardt | Sam Hunt Racing | Toyota | 163 | 0 | Running | 19 |
| 20 | 23 | 02 | Brett Moffitt | Our Motorsports | Chevrolet | 163 | 0 | Running | 17 |
| 21 | 36 | 6 | Ryan Vargas | JD Motorsports | Chevrolet | 163 | 0 | Running | 16 |
| 22 | 28 | 08 | David Starr | SS-Green Light Racing | Ford | 163 | 0 | Running | 15 |
| 23 | 12 | 36 | Alex Labbé | DGM Racing | Chevrolet | 162 | 0 | Running | 14 |
| 24 | 30 | 91 | Mason Massey | DGM Racing | Chevrolet | 162 | 0 | Running | 13 |
| 25 | 20 | 78 | Josh Williams | B. J. McLeod Motorsports | Chevrolet | 162 | 0 | Running | 12 |
| 26 | 32 | 35 | Joey Gase | Emerling-Gase Motorsports | Ford | 161 | 0 | Running | 11 |
| 27 | 37 | 13 | Natalie Decker | MBM Motorsports | Ford | 161 | 0 | Running | 10 |
| 28 | 34 | 45 | Caesar Bacarella | Alpha Prime Racing | Chevrolet | 161 | 0 | Running | 9 |
| 29 | 17 | 4 | Bayley Currey | JD Motorsports | Chevrolet | 161 | 0 | Running | 8 |
| 30 | 31 | 07 | Joe Graf Jr. | SS-Green Light Racing | Ford | 161 | 0 | Running | 7 |
| 31 | 38 | 47 | Brennan Poole (i) | Mike Harmon Racing | Chevrolet | 159 | 0 | Running | 0 |
| 32 | 27 | 34 | Jesse Iwuji | Jesse Iwuji Motorsports | Chevrolet | 157 | 0 | Running | 5 |
| 33 | 24 | 68 | Brandon Brown | Brandonbilt Motorsports | Chevrolet | 119 | 0 | Accident | 19 |
| 34 | 10 | 1 | Sam Mayer | JR Motorsports | Chevrolet | 106 | 0 | Accident | 3 |
| 35 | 1 | 54 | Ty Gibbs | Joe Gibbs Racing | Toyota | 93 | 7 | Accident | 15 |
| 36 | 35 | 66 | J. J. Yeley | MBM Motorsports | Ford | 71 | 0 | Fuel Pump | 1 |
| 37 | 33 | 5 | Matt Mills (i) | B. J. McLeod Motorsports | Chevrolet | 64 | 0 | Engine | 0 |
| 38 | 25 | 44 | Sage Karam | Alpha Prime Racing | Chevrolet | 23 | 0 | Engine | 1 |
Official race results

== Standings after the race ==
Drivers' Championship standings

| Pos | Driver | Points |
|---|---|---|
| 1 | A. J. Allmendinger | 669 |
| 2 | Ty Gibbs | 640 (-29) |
| 3 | Justin Allgaier | 639 (-30) |
| 4 | Josh Berry | 605 (-64) |
| 5 | Noah Gragson | 602 (-67) |
| 6 | Austin Hill | 539 (-130) |
| 7 | Brandon Jones | 528 (-141) |
| 8 | Sam Mayer | 490 (-179) |
| 9 | Riley Herbst | 482 (-187) |
| 10 | Daniel Hemric | 454 (-215) |
| 11 | Ryan Sieg | 422 (-247) |
| 12 | Landon Cassill | 421 (-248) |
Official driver's standings

- Note: Only the first 12 positions are included for the driver standings.

| Previous race: 2022 Henry 180 | NASCAR Xfinity Series; 2022 season | Next race: 2022 Crayon 200 |
