= Jesse Iwuji Motorsports =

American stock car racing team

- Owner(s): Jesse Iwuji; Emmitt Smith; Matt Casto
- Base: Gaffney, South Carolina
- Series: NASCAR Xfinity Series; ARCA Menards Series
- Manufacturer: Chevrolet
- Opened: 2021

Career
- Debut: Xfinity Series: 2022 Beef. It's What's for Dinner 300 (Daytona)
- Latest race: Xfinity Series: 2023 Pennzoil 150 (Indianapolis)
- Races competed: Total: 33; Xfinity Series: 33
- Drivers' Championships: Total: 0 Xfinity Series: 0
- Race victories: Total: 0 Xfinity Series: 0
- Pole positions: Total: 0 Xfinity Series: 0

Jesse Iwuji Motorsports is an American stock car racing team that most recently competed part-time in the NASCAR Xfinity Series. It was founded in 2021 by NFL hall of famer, Emmitt Smith, with NASCAR driver and United States Navy Reserve officer, Jesse Iwuji, and they fielded the No. 34 Chevrolet Camaro SS for owner/driver, Jesse Iwuji and others.

== History ==
On August 21, 2021, Jesse Iwuji announced the formation of his new team, Jesse Iwuji Motorsports, that will compete full-time in the NASCAR Xfinity Series in 2022. He also announced that Emmitt Smith, a former NFL running back, would co-own the team with him. In December 2021, Iwuji announced the sponsor for his team, which would be the Equity Prime Mortgage company.

On December 9, 2022, Jesse Iwuji Motorsports filed a US$4.125 million lawsuit against Equity Prime Mortgage for breach of contract. In February 2023, EPM filed a counterclaim on JIM.

In 2025, it was announced that the team would have an ownership stake with DGM Racing.

== NASCAR Xfinity Series ==
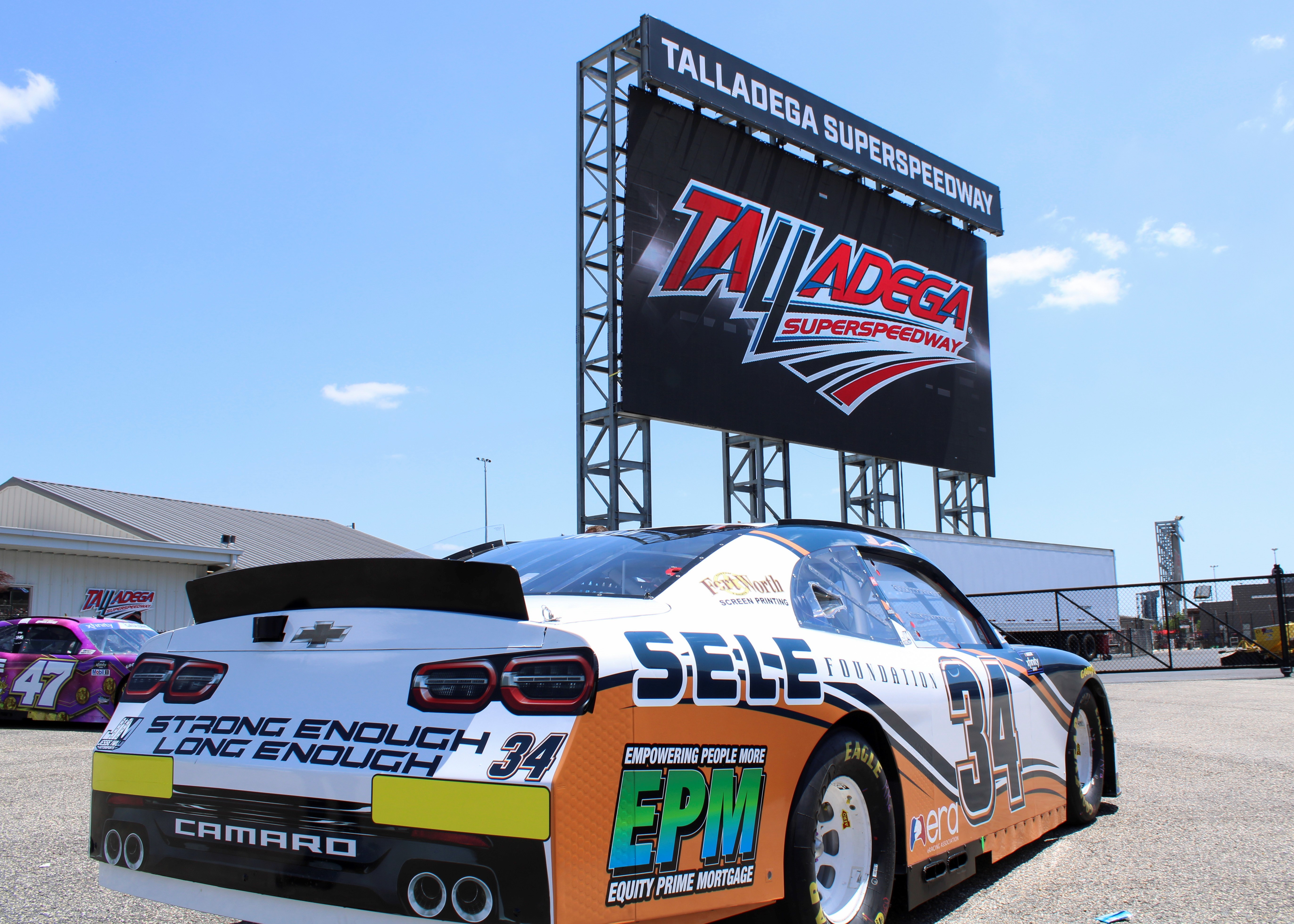
Iwuji in the No. 34 car at Talladega Superspeedway in 2022.

=== Car No. 34 history ===
On February 7, 2022, Iwuji and Smith partnered with Chevrolet as the manufacturer for the 2022 NASCAR Xfinity Series season, with the number being 34, as a tribute to Wendell Scott. The team was scheduled to run the full 33-race schedule, with Iwuji competing for Rookie of the Year honors. The team operated out of the JD Motorsports race shop, with providing engines from Hendrick Motorsports.

Iwuji started the 2022 season with a 27th place finish at Daytona, and followed with two top thirty finishes at Auto Club and Las Vegas. At Phoenix, Jesse Little replaced Iwuji as a last-minute decision for an unknown reason, he would fail to qualify. Iwuji returned the following week at Atlanta, finishing 27th. After the team failed to qualify for a second time at Circuit of the Americas, it was announced on March 31 that Kyle Weatherman will drive the 34 car at Richmond, where he would finish 28th. Although he was only scheduled for a one race deal, Weatherman returned the following week at Martinsville, giving the team their best-career finish of sixteenth. He beat that result after finishing twelfth at Darlington. Iwuji and Weatherman would split the driver's seat for the rest of the season. At New Hampshire, Weatherman finished in tenth, giving JIM their first-career top-ten and their best finish to date. After Noah Gragson and Landon Cassill were disqualified from second and third place, Weatherman would later be scored in the eighth position. In the August race at Daytona, Iwuji survived numerous wrecks and earned his career best finish of eleventh. He received sponsorship from Coca-Cola Zero Sugar in that race. On September 28, it was announced that Kaz Grala would drive the No. 34 at the Charlotte Roval, finishing 35th after being involved in a late incident. The team ended the season with one top ten and ten top twenties, finishing 29th in owner's points.

The team returned for the 2023 season, but only for a partial schedule due to sponsorship issues. Iwuji ran the season-opener at Daytona, finishing 30th after being involved in a wreck. He attempted to make the race at Talladega, but failed to qualify. On June 9, it was announced that the USF2000 Championship driver Andre Castro would make his Xfinity Series debut for the team at the Chicago Street Course, with sponsorship from the University of Chicago Medical Center.

==== Car No. 34 results ====
NASCAR Xfinity Series results
Year	Driver	No.	Make	1	2	3	4	5	6	7	8	9	10	11	12	13	14	15	16	17	18	19	20	21	22	23	24	25	26	27	28	29	30	31	32	33	NXSC	Pts	Ref
2022	Jesse Iwuji	34	Chevy	DAY; 27	CAL; 36	LVS; 34		ATL; 27	COA; DNQ			TAL; DNQ			TEX; 34		PIR; 26		ROA; 22	ATL; 32						DAY; 11		KAN; 36			TAL; 28						29th	392	
2022	Jesse Little	34	Chevy				PHO; DNQ																														29th	392	
2022	Kyle Weatherman	34	Chevy							RCH; 28	MAR; 16		DOV; 27	DAR; 12		CLT; 36		NSH; 38			NHA; 8	POC; 19	IND; 30	MCH; 16	GLN; 22		DAR; 16		BRI; 17	TEX; 22			LVS; 14	HOM; 20	MAR; 30	PHO; 14	29th	392	
2022	Kaz Grala	34	Chevy																													ROV; 35					29th	392	
2023	Jesse Iwuji	34	Chevy	DAY; 30	CAL	LVS	PHO	ATL	COA	RCH	MAR	TAL; DNQ	DOV	DAR	CLT	PIR	SON	NSH																			49th	9	
2023	Andre Castro	34	Chevy																CSC; 37	ATL	NHA	POC	ROA	MCH	IRC; 36	GLN	DAY	DAR	KAN	BRI	TEX	ROV	LVS	HOM	MAR	PHO	49th	9	
