= Ram: Race for the Seat =

2026 American reality competition series

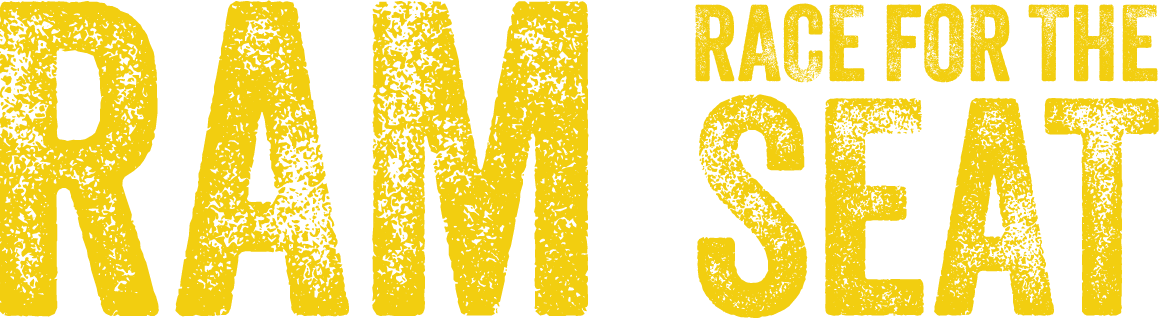
- Genre: Reality competition
- Presented by: Jacob Lofland
- Country of origin: United States
- Original language: English
- No. of seasons: 1
- No. of episodes: 8

Production
- Running time: 44 minutes
- Production companies: Thrill Sports Productions; Stellantis (Ram Trucks); Kaulig Racing

Original release
- Network: FOX / FS1 / YouTube
- Release: January 25 – February 6, 2026

Ram: Race for the Seat is an American reality television competition series that aired from January 25 to February 6, 2026. The series features 15 aspiring race car drivers from various short-track backgrounds competing for a full-time professional ride in the NASCAR Craftsman Truck Series for the 2026 season. The competition served as the official launch for Ram Trucks' return to NASCAR competition.

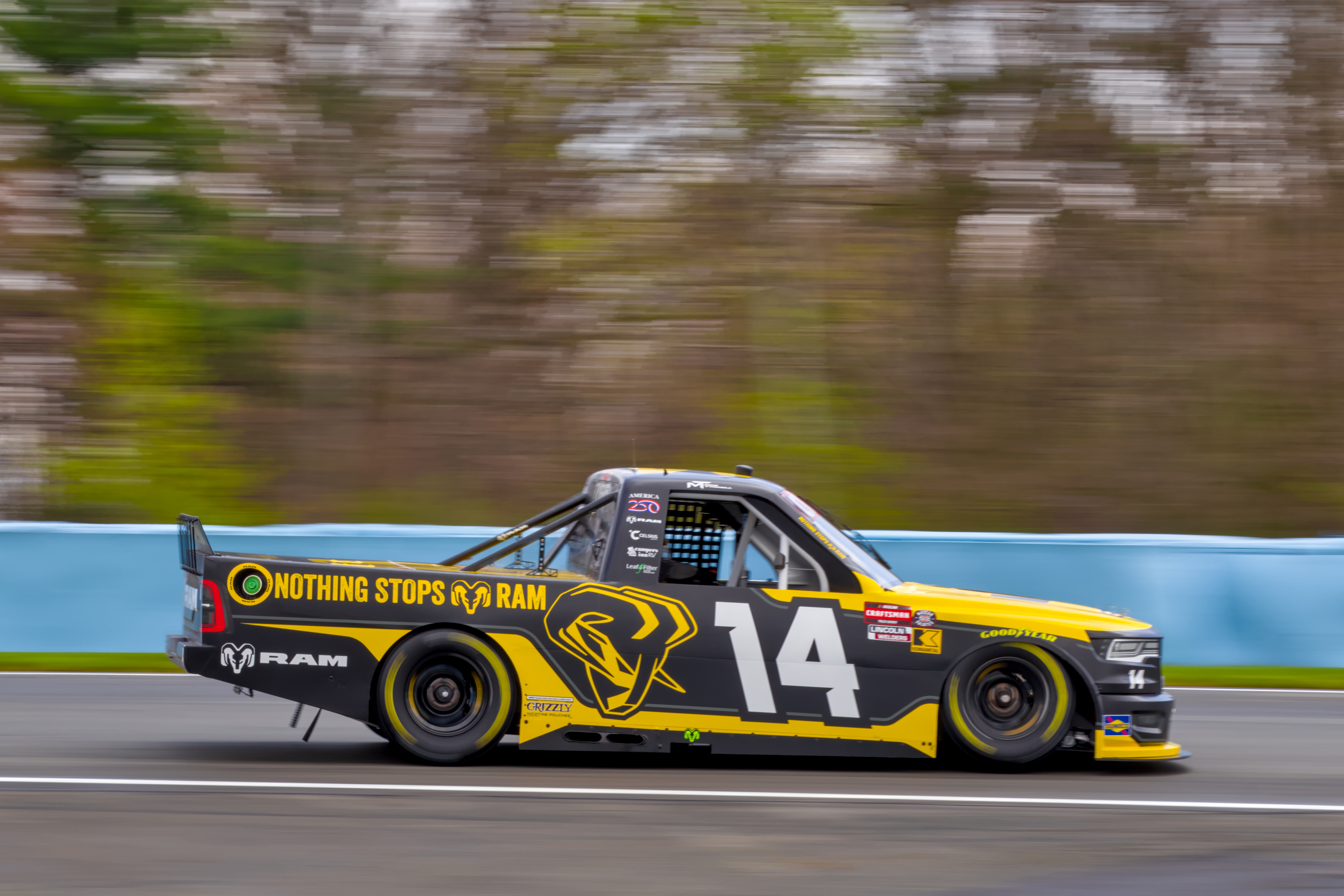
Winner Mini Tyrrell's number 14 truck at Watkins Glen

On February 7, 2026, Timothy "Mini" Tyrrell was crowned the winner, earning the seat in the No. 14 Ram 1500 for Kaulig Racing.

The series could possibly have a second season, as Tyrrell will not return to Kaulig in 2027.

== Premise ==
The show follows 15 contestants living together in a house in North Carolina while undergoing a series of on-track and off-track evaluations. Drivers are judged on their performance in Late Model Stock Car, Legends, and Go-kart competitions, as well as their physical fitness, technical feedback, and media marketability. The winner of the competition receives a fully funded primary sponsorship from Ram for the entire 25-race NASCAR Truck Series season.

== Judges and mentors ==
The competition is overseen by a panel of industry leaders:

- Tim Kuniskis: CEO of Ram.
- Matt Kaulig: Owner of Kaulig Racing.
- Chris Rice: President of Kaulig Racing.
- Ty Norris: Kaulig Racing Chief Business Officer.

== Contestants ==
The roster consisted of 15 drivers selected from regional series such as the CARS Tour, NASCAR Whelen Modified Tour, and ARCA Menards Series.

Driver	Background	Result
Timothy "Mini" Tyrrell	CARS Tour (LMSC)	Winner
Carson Ferguson	Dirt Late Model / Legends	Runner-up
Austin Beers	NASCAR Whelen Modified Tour	Finalist
Landon Huffman	Late Model Stock Cars	Finalist
Trevor Ward	Virginia Late Model Triple Crown	Semi-finalist
Mike Christopher Jr.	NASCAR Whelen Modified Tour	Semi-finalist
Casey Kelley	Late Model Stock Cars	Eliminated
Cody Kelley	Late Model Stock Cars	Eliminated
Tanner Reif	ARCA Menards Series West	Eliminated
Jared Fryar	Late Model Stock Cars	Eliminated
Kade Brown	Late Model Stock Cars / Legends	Eliminated
Ryan Gemmell	NASCAR Classic Series	Eliminated
Chase Burrow	Late Model Stock Cars	Eliminated
Jonathan Cash	SE Modifieds / LMSC	Eliminated
Grant Griesbach	Midwest Super Late Models	Eliminated

== Venues ==
The series was filmed at several prominent racing facilities in the Southeastern United States:

- Virginia International Raceway (Alton, VA): Used for road course testing and precision driving.
- South Boston Speedway (South Boston, VA): Site of the season finale 20-lap Late Model showdown.
- Caraway Speedway (Sophia, NC): Used for short-track oval challenges and heat races.
- Rockingham Speedway (Rockingham, NC): Hosted high-speed oval testing and technical evaluations.

== Episodes ==
The series premiered on FOX before moving to FS1 and the official Ram Trucks YouTube channel.

No.	Title	Original air date
1	"The Return of the Ram"	January 25, 2026
2	"Dirt vs. Asphalt"	January 26, 2026
3	"Under the Microscope"	January 27, 2026
4	"The Elimination Oval"	January 28, 2026
5	"Media Mayhem"	January 29, 2026
6	"Sim to Reality"	January 30, 2026
7	"The Final Four"	February 5, 2026
8	"A New Champion Crowned"	February 6, 2026

== See also ==
- Roush Racing: Driver X
