= Casey Kelley =

American racing driver

- Born: Hartsville, South Carolina, U.S.

CARS Late Model Stock Tour career
- Debut season: 2025
- Years active: 2025–present
- Starts: 4
- Championships: 0
- Wins: 0
- Poles: 1
- Best finish: 45th in 2026
- Statistics up to date as of October 27, 2026.

Casey Kelley (birth date unknown) is an American professional stock car racing driver. He currently competes in the zMAX CARS Tour, driving the No. 16K Toyota for AK Performance. He is the twin brother of fellow driver Cody Kelley, who also competes in late-model racing.

Before the 2026 season, Kelley competed in Kaulig Racing's "Race For the Seat", competing against 14 other drivers to try to win a full-season ride in the team's No. 14 truck.

Kelley has also competed in series such as the Virginia Late Model Triple Crown Series, the Atlantic Turfscapes Super Truck Series, the All-Pro Limited Late Model Series, and the NASCAR Weekly Series, and is a frequent competitor at Florence Motor Speedway.

== Motorsports results ==
=== CARS Late Model Stock Car Tour ===
(key) (Bold – Pole position awarded by qualifying time. Italics – Pole position earned by points standings or practice time. * – Most laps led. ** – All laps led.)

CARS Late Model Stock Car Tour results
Year	Team	No.	Make	1	2	3	4	5	6	7	8	9	10	11	12	13	14	15	16	17	CLMSCTC	Pts	Ref
2024	AK Performance	21	Chevy	SNM	HCY	AAS	OCS	ACE	TCM	LGY	DOM	CRW	HCY	NWS	ACE	WCS	FLC; 22	SBO	TCM	NWS	N/A	0	
2025	AK Performance	16	Chevy	AAS	WCS	CDL	OCS	ACE	NWS	LGY	DOM	CRW	HCY	AND	**FLC**; 3	SBO	TCM	NWS			51st	42	
2026	AK Performance	16K	Toyota	SNM	WCS	NSV	CRW	ACE	LGY	DOM	NWS	HCY	AND; 10	FLC; 9	TCM	NPS	SBO				45th	65	
