= Kaulig Racing =

NASCAR team

- Owner: Matt Kaulig
- Principal: Chris Rice (CEO)
- Base: Welcome, North Carolina
- Series: NASCAR Cup Series, NASCAR Craftsman Truck Series
- Race drivers: Cup Series: 10. Ty Dillon; 16. A. J. Allmendinger; Craftsman Truck Series: 10. Corey LaJoie; 12. Brenden Queen; 14. TBA (R); 16. Justin Haley; 25. A. J. Allmendinger, Ty Dillon, Colin Braun, Conor Daly, Mini Tyrrell
- Manufacturer: Dodge; Ram Trucks
- Opened: 2016
- Website: kauligracing.com

Career
- Debut: Cup Series: 2020 Daytona 500 (Daytona); Xfinity Series: 2016 PowerShares QQQ 300 (Daytona); Craftsman Truck Series: 2026 Fresh From Florida 250 (Daytona)
- Latest race: Cup Series: 2026 Season Finale 400 (Homestead); Xfinity Series: 2025 NASCAR Xfinity Series Championship Race (Phoenix); Craftsman Truck Series: 2026 Craftsman 200 (Homestead)
- Races competed: Total: 545; Cup Series: 190; Xfinity Series: 330; Craftsman Truck Series: 25
- Drivers' Championships: Total: 0 Cup Series: 0 Xfinity Series: 0 Craftsman Truck Series: 0
- Race victories: Total: 29; Cup Series: 2 Xfinity Series: 27; Craftsman Truck Series: 0
- Pole positions: Total: 20; Cup Series: 2 Xfinity Series: 18; Craftsman Truck Series: 0

Kaulig Racing is an American professional stock car racing team that competes in the NASCAR Cup Series and the NASCAR Craftsman Truck Series. Kaulig fields two Cup Series Dodge Charger teams: the No. 10 full-time for Ty Dillon and the No. 16 full-time for A. J. Allmendinger. They also field five full-time Truck RAM teams: the No. 10 truck for Corey LaJoie, the No. 12 truck for Brenden Queen, the No. 14 truck for TBA, the No. 16 truck for Justin Haley, and the No. 25 truck, with various drivers as the flagship team for RAM. The team is owned by Matt Kaulig, who also owns the team's sponsor, LeafFilter. The team has a shop on the Richard Childress Racing campus in Welcome, North Carolina, and formerly operated out of the NTS Motorsports facility. The team previously competed in the NASCAR Xfinity Series.

== Cup Series ==
=== Car No. 10 history ===
Ty Dillon (2025–present)

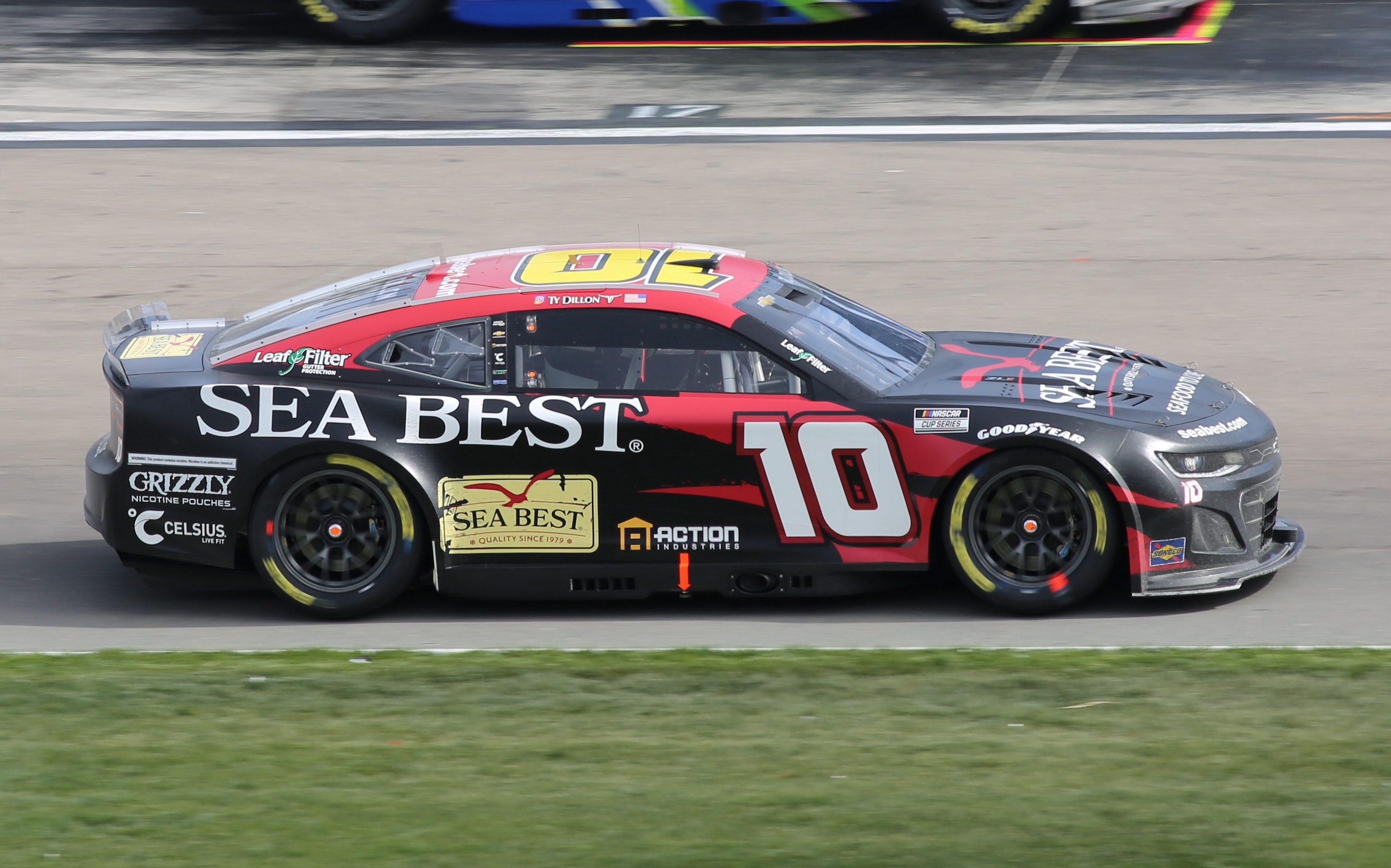
Ty Dillon in the No. 10 car at Las Vegas Motor Speedway in 2025

Ty Dillon was announced as the driver of Kaulig's second entry in 2025. Along with Dillon driving, the team said they would use the No. 10. He started the season with a 14th-place finish at the 2025 Daytona 500. During the first round of the inaugural NASCAR In-Season Challenge at Atlanta, Dillon would start as the #32 seed in the brackets. He would finish 8th in the race and defeating #1 seed Denny Hamlin. He stayed consistent throughout the In-Season Challenge and made it to the final round at the Brickyard 400 against Ty Gibbs. However, Gibbs defeated Dillon to win the US$1 million.

Dillon remained with the team in 2026. He started the 2026 season with another 14th-place finish at the 2026 Daytona 500.

==== Car No. 10 results ====
Year	Driver	No.	Make	1	2	3	4	5	6	7	8	9	10	11	12	13	14	15	16	17	18	19	20	21	22	23	24	25	26	27	28	29	30	31	32	33	34	35	36	Owners	Pts
2025	Ty Dillon	10	Chevy	DAY; 14	ATL; 29	COA; 28	PHO; 16	LVS; 21	HOM; 27	MAR; 15	DAR; 16	BRI; 32	TAL; 23	TEX; 12	KAN; 35	CLT; 19	NSH; 26	MCH; 24	MXC; 33	POC; 33	ATL; 8	CSC; 20	SON; 17	DOV; 20	IND; 28	IOW; 35	GLN; 30	RCH; 20	DAY; 22	DAR; 34	GTW; 34	BRI; 27	NHA; 29	KAN; 13	ROV; 27	LVS; 37	TAL; 20	MAR; 26	PHO; 35	33rd	477
2026	Ty Dillon	10	Chevy	DAY; 14	ATL; 16	COA; 16	PHO; 26	LVS; 33	DAR; 31	MAR; 37	BRI; 29	KAN; 33	TAL; 13	TEX; 24	GLN; 33	CLT; 25	NSH; 12	MCH; 24	POC; 32	COR; 30	SON; 35	CHI; 20	ATL; 20	NWS; 16	IND; 30	IOW; 24	RCH; 32	NHA; 27	DAY; 21	DAR; 31	GTW; 30	BRI; 36	KAN; 28	LVS; 31	CLT; 30	PHO; 31	TAL; 15	MAR; 22	HOM; 31	35th	395

=== Car No. 13 history ===
Part-time (2023–2025)

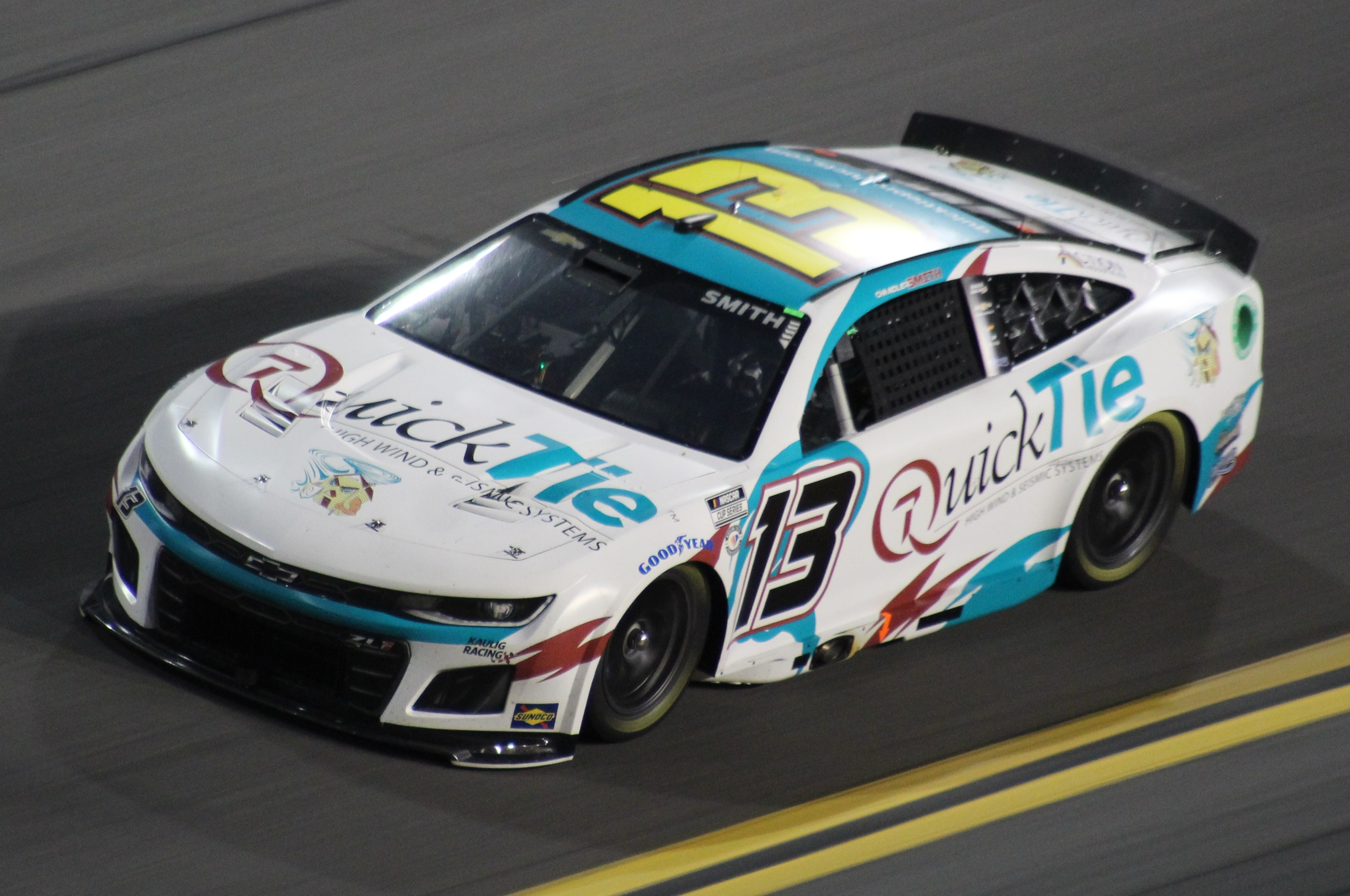
Chandler Smith in the No. 13 at Daytona International Speedway in 2023

Kaulig Racing announced that they will field a third car on a part-time basis, with Xfinity driver Chandler Smith driving for five races, starting with the Daytona 500, with sponsorship for that race coming from Quick Tie. Smith failed to make the Daytona 500 after finishing eighteenth in Duel 1 of the 2023 Bluegreen Vacations Duels. Smith made his official Cup debut at Richmond, finishing seventeenth. On March 9, the team announced dirt racer Jonathan Davenport would be driving the entry in his Cup Series debut at the Food City Dirt Race. He finished 36th in the race.

In 2024, A. J. Allmendinger would drive No. 13 in the road course races when Shane van Gisbergen was driving the No. 16. Allmendinger made his first start in the No. 13 at Circuit of the Americas, where he finished sixth. Allmendinger would drive the car at Chicago and Watkins Glen, but failed to finish both races with an accident at Chicago and suffering a transmission failure at Watkins Glen.

In 2025, it was announced that Will Brown would drive the No. 13 Chevrolet at the Chicago Street Race.

==== Car No. 13 results ====
Year	Driver	No.	Make	1	2	3	4	5	6	7	8	9	10	11	12	13	14	15	16	17	18	19	20	21	22	23	24	25	26	27	28	29	30	31	32	33	34	35	36	Owners	Pts
2023	Chandler Smith	13	Chevy	DAY; DNQ	CAL	LVS	PHO	ATL	COA	RCH; 17																			DAY; 15	DAR	KAN	BRI	TEX	TAL; 11	ROV	LVS	HOM	MAR	PHO	39th	69
2023	Jonathan Davenport	13	Chevy								BRD; 36	MAR	TAL	DOV	KAN	DAR	CLT	GTW	SON	NSH	CSC	ATL	NHA	POC	RCH	MCH	IRC	GLN												39th	69
2024	A. J. Allmendinger	13	Chevy	DAY	ATL	LVS	PHO	BRI	COA; 6	RCH	MAR	TEX	TAL	DOV	KAN	DAR	CLT	GTW	SON	IOW	NHA	NSH	CSC; 38	POC	IND	RCH	MCH	DAY	DAR	ATL	GLN; 36	BRI	KAN	TAL; 28						38th	77
2024	Shane van Gisbergen	13	Chevy																																ROV; 7	LVS	HOM	MAR	PHO	38th	77
2025	Will Brown	13	Chevy	DAY	ATL	COA	PHO	LVS	HOM	MAR	DAR	BRI	TAL	TEX	KAN	CLT	NSH	MCH	MXC	POC	ATL	CSC; 39	SON	DOV	IND	IOW	GLN	RCH	DAY	DAR	GTW	BRI	NHA	KAN	ROV	LVS	TAL	MAR	PHO	49th	1

=== Car No. 16 history ===
Part-time (2020–2021)

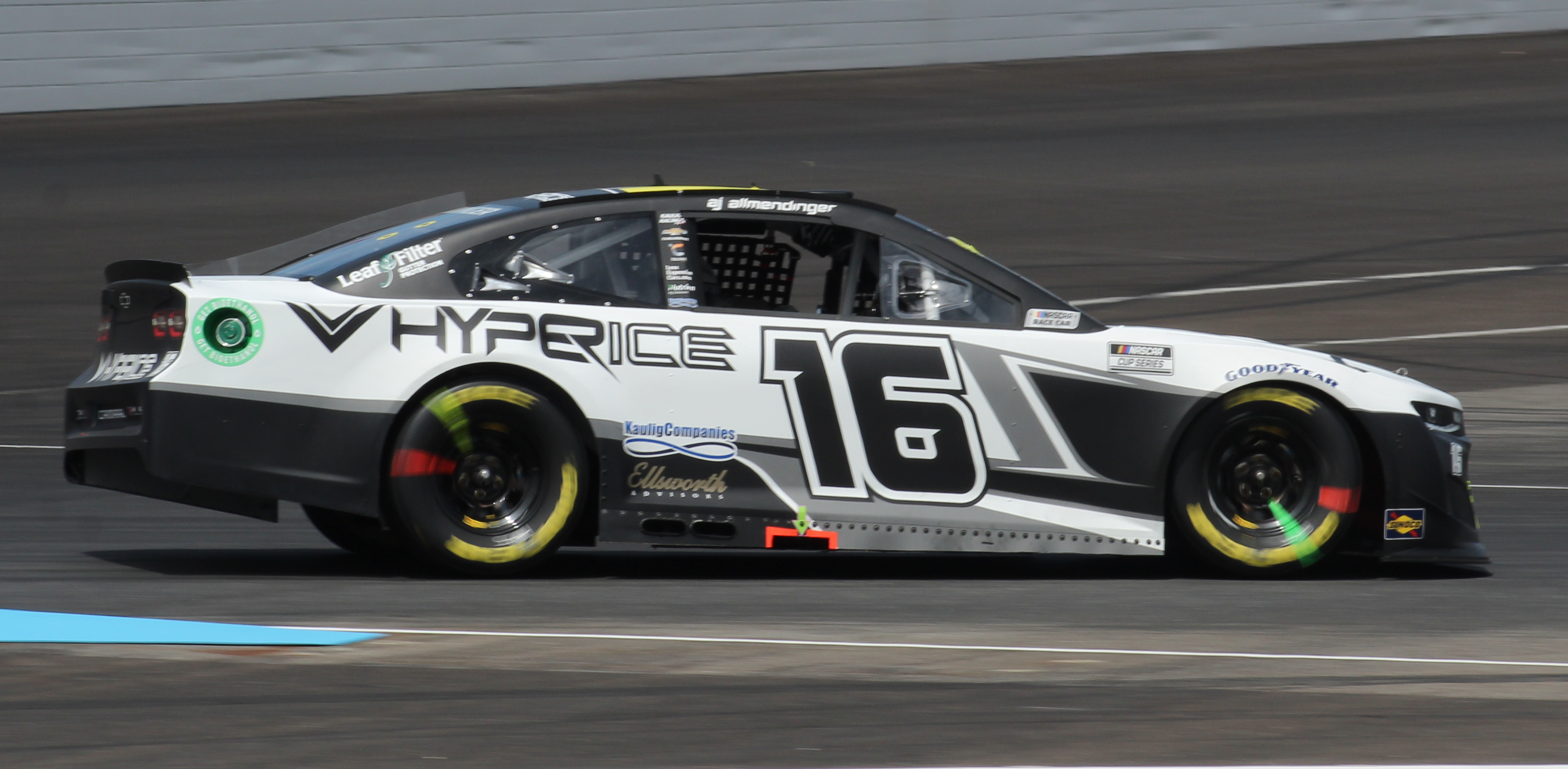
A. J. Allmendinger in the No. 16 at Indianapolis Motor Speedway in 2021

On January 10, 2020, Kaulig Racing announced they would make their NASCAR Cup Series debut at the Daytona 500, fielding the No. 16 for Justin Haley. The Fraternal Order of Eagles would sponsor Haley's entry. On February 8, Kaulig announced the team was looking to do more races in 2020. The next day, Haley made the field by posting the fastest qualifying speed of all the non-charter teams (190.018 mph; 31st overall). After failing to run more Cup races in 2020 in the wake of the COVID-19 pandemic, the team announced plans during the offseason to run the superspeedways and road course races in 2021. On January 13, 2021, it was announced that Kaz Grala would attempt to qualify for the Daytona 500 in the No. 16 car for Kaulig. Grala also attempted the GEICO 500 at Talladega, finishing a career best sixth place. A. J. Allmendinger returned to Cup by racing at the Daytona RC, then Circuit of the Americas.

On April 28, 2021, Matt Kaulig announced on SiriusXM Radio that Kaulig Racing would race full-time in the NASCAR Cup Series in the 2022 season. On June 18, the team announced that it purchased two charters from Spire Motorsports and would have Haley drive full-time in 2022. On August 15, Allmendinger gave Kaulig Racing their first Cup Series win at the Indianapolis road course in only the team's seventh Cup Series start. At the 2021 Coke Zero Sugar 400 at Daytona, Grala suffered a foot injury from one of the race's accidents.

Daniel Hemric, A. J. Allmendinger, and Noah Gragson (2022)

On December 14, 2021, Kaulig Racing announced the 2022 lineup for the No. 16, with Daniel Hemric and Noah Gragson joining the previously announced A. J. Allmendinger. Hemric is to run 8 races, Gragson will run 14, and Allmendinger will run 16 including the Clash and the All-Star Race. While Hemric drove his eight races, Gragson only drove ten as near the end of the season, he drove in the Hendrick Motorsports No. 48 for five races as Alex Bowman recovered from injury. Allmendinger drove the remainder of Gragson's scheduled races, making it eighteen races in the No. 16 for Allmendinger.

On May 3, 2022, crew chief Matt Swiderski was suspended for four races due to a tire and wheel loss at Dover.

A. J. Allmendinger (2023)

On October 5, Kaulig Racing announced that Allmendinger would drive the No. 16 full-time in 2023, marking his first full-time Cup season since 2018. Despite not making the playoffs, Allmendinger scored a win at the Charlotte Roval. Allmendinger would not return to the Cup Series full-time in 2024, instead competing full-time in the Xfinity Series, with a part-time schedule in Cup.

Rotation of drivers (2024)

The team used multiple drivers for the 2024 NASCAR Cup Series season. Allmendinger would remain in the car running in a part-time capacity. The team also announced that the team's other NASCAR Xfinity Series drivers, Josh Williams, and Shane van Gisbergen, would also run races. On February 22, 2024, Derek Kraus was announced for a six-race slate beginning at Las Vegas Motor Speedway. On March 25, 2024, Kaulig announced that Ty Dillon would drive a five-race schedule, beginning at Richmond Raceway. On October 16, crew chief Travis Mack left the team. Darian Grubb replaced him at Las Vegas.

Return to A. J. Allmendinger (2025–present)

On August 15, 2024, Kaulig announced that Allmendinger would return full-time to the No. 16 in 2025. Allmendinger would begin the season with a DNF at the Daytona 500 caused by a blown engine, placing him last in 41st place. He ended the season 26th in points with two top-fives, seven top-tens, and a pole.

Allmendinger would begin the 2026 season with a 19th-place finish in the Daytona 500. He would score his first top 10 of the season at Austin. At Sonoma, Allmendinger had his 500th career start.

==== Car No. 16 results ====
Year	Driver	No.	Make	1	2	3	4	5	6	7	8	9	10	11	12	13	14	15	16	17	18	19	20	21	22	23	24	25	26	27	28	29	30	31	32	33	34	35	36	Owners	Pts
2020	Justin Haley	16	Chevy	DAY; 13	LVS	CAL	PHO	DAR	DAR	CLT	CLT	BRI	ATL	MAR	HOM	TAL	POC	POC	IND	KEN	TEX	KAN	NHA	MCH	MCH	DRC	DOV	DOV	DAY	DAR	RCH	BRI	LVS	TAL	ROV	KAN	TEX	MAR	PHO	42nd	24
2021	Kaz Grala	16	Chevy	DAY; 28									TAL; 6	KAN	DAR	DOV													DAY; 36	DAR	RCH	BRI	LVS							37th	193
2021	A. J. Allmendinger	16	Chevy		DAY; 7	HOM	LVS	PHO	ATL	BRD	MAR	RCH					COA; 5	CLT	SON	NSH	POC	POC	ROA; 29	ATL	NHA	GLN	IND; 1	MCH							CLT; 38	TEX	KAN	MAR	PHO	37th	193
2021	Justin Haley	16	Chevy																															TAL; 20						37th	193
2022	Daniel Hemric	16	Chevy	DAY; 12	CAL; 9	LVS; 22							TAL; 36		DAR; 31														DAY; 26	DAR; 23				TAL; 34						26th	622
2022	A. J. Allmendinger	16	Chevy				PHO; 20		COA; 33	RCH; 27	MAR; 24			DOV; 33				GTW; 10	SON; 19	NSH; 19	ROA; 9		NHA; 16		IND; 7			GLN; 2				BRI; 7			CLT; 4	LVS; 9	HOM; 3	MAR; 23	PHO; 12	26th	622
2022	Noah Gragson	16	Chevy					ATL; 37				BRI; 27				KAN; 18	CLT; 24					ATL; 34		POC; 24		MCH; 30	RCH; 24				KAN; 18		TEX; 21							26th	622
2023	A. J. Allmendinger	16	Chevy	DAY; 6	CAL; 36	LVS; 18	PHO; 20	ATL; 16	COA; 34	RCH; 27	BRD; 16	MAR; 27	TAL; 29	DOV; 18	KAN; 14	DAR; 23	CLT; 14	GTW; 14	SON; 6	NSH; 10	CSC; 17	ATL; 3	NHA; 19	POC; 17	RCH; 27	MCH; 26	IRC; 26	GLN; 4	DAY; 29	DAR; 13	KAN; 30	BRI; 30	TEX; 29	TAL; 20	ROV; 1*	LVS; 20	HOM; 5	MAR; 28	PHO; 32	21st	692
2024	A. J. Allmendinger	16	Chevy	DAY; 6				BRI; 23						DOV; 13					SON; 6	IOW; 36		NSH; 11		POC; 21	IND; 37		MCH; 30					BRI; 23			ROV; 6		HOM; 8			28th	545
2024	Josh Williams	16	Chevy		ATL; 37						MAR; 27																													28th	545
2024	Derek Kraus	16	Chevy			LVS; 28	PHO; 35								KAN; 31	DAR; 29		GTW; 30																					PHO; 25	28th	545
2024	Shane van Gisbergen	16	Chevy						COA; 20				TAL; 28				CLT; 28						CSC; 40					DAY; 35	DAR; 26	ATL; 32	GLN; 2			TAL; 15		LVS; 29		MAR; 12		28th	545
2024	Ty Dillon	16	Chevy							RCH; 29		TEX; 16									NHA; 20					RCH; 26							KAN; 21							28th	545
2025	A. J. Allmendinger	16	Chevy	DAY; 41	ATL; 14	COA; 30	PHO; 22	LVS; 8	HOM; 7	MAR; 23	DAR; 18	BRI; 9	TAL; 24	TEX; 36	KAN; 38	CLT; 4	NSH; 20	MCH; 17	MXC; 13	POC; 21	ATL; 12	CSC; 6	SON; 18	DOV; 37	IND; 23	IOW; 18	GLN; 11	RCH; 22	DAY; 26	DAR; 5	GTW; 23	BRI; 36	NHA; 20	KAN; 36	ROV; 9	LVS; 19	TAL; 37	MAR; 28	PHO; 38	26th	649
2026	A. J. Allmendinger	16	Chevy	DAY; 19	ATL; 12	COA; 9	PHO; 19	LVS; 24	DAR; 30	MAR; 27	BRI; 15	KAN; 31	TAL; 16	TEX; 25	GLN; 7	CLT; 18	NSH; 35	MCH; 17	POC; 22	COR; 5	SON; 16	CHI; 17	ATL; 37	NWS; 37	IND; 25	IOW; 8	RCH; 33	NHA; 23	DAY; 30	DAR; 22	GTW; 16	BRI; 22	KAN; 22	LVS; 15	CLT; 28	PHO; 23	TAL; 31	MAR; 25	HOM; 23	26th	606

=== Car No. 31 history ===
Justin Haley (2022–2023)

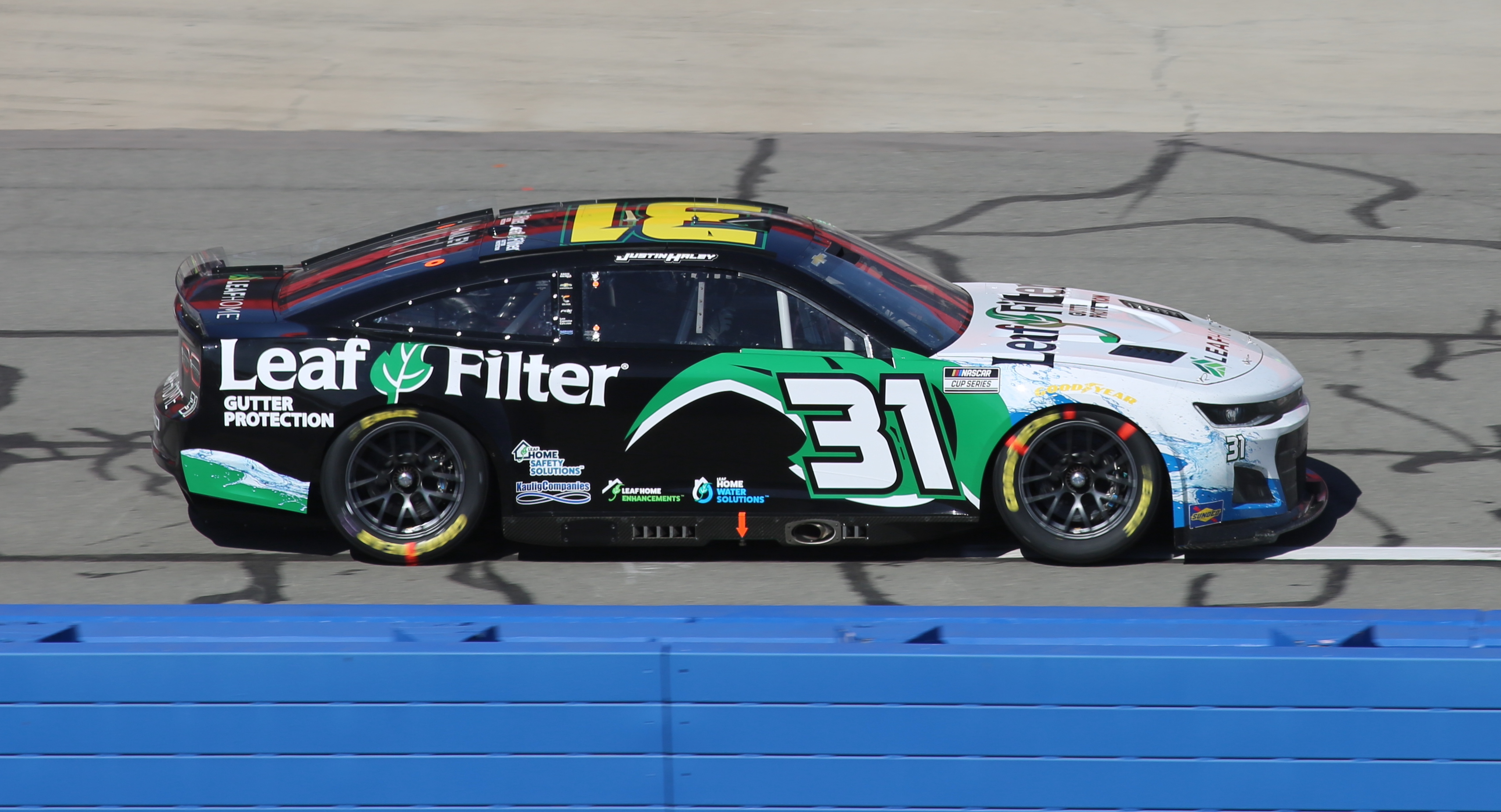
Justin Haley in the No. 31 at Auto Club in 2022

On June 18, 2021, when Justin Haley was announced to drive full-time for Kaulig Racing in 2022, the team stated that he would pilot the No. 16, the number Kaulig used for its Cup Series races in 2020 and 2021. However, following the news that Kaulig's other chartered entry would use the No. 16, the team announced on December 15, 2021, that Haley would drive the No. 31 in 2022. Haley finished 23rd at the 2022 Daytona 500, but following the race, crew chief Trent Owens was suspended for four races due to a tire and wheel loss during the race. On May 17, Owens was once again suspended for four races due to a tire and wheel loss during the 2022 AdventHealth 400 at Kansas.

Haley began the 2023 season with a 32nd-place finish at the 2023 Daytona 500. On March 15, the No. 31 was served an L2 penalty after unapproved hood louvers were found installed on the car during pre-race inspection at Phoenix; as a result, the team was docked one hundred driver and owner points and ten playoff points. In addition, Owens was suspended for four races and fined US$100,000. On April 5, the National Motorsports Appeals Panel amended the penalty, upholding the fine, Owens' suspension, and 10 playoff points, but reducing the 100 driver and owner points deduction to 75 points. On April 19, the Final Appeals Officer rescinded all points deductions levied against the team at the request of NASCAR.

It was announced on July 20, 2023, that Haley would be leaving the team in 2024 after signing a multi-year agreement with Rick Ware Racing.

Daniel Hemric (2024)

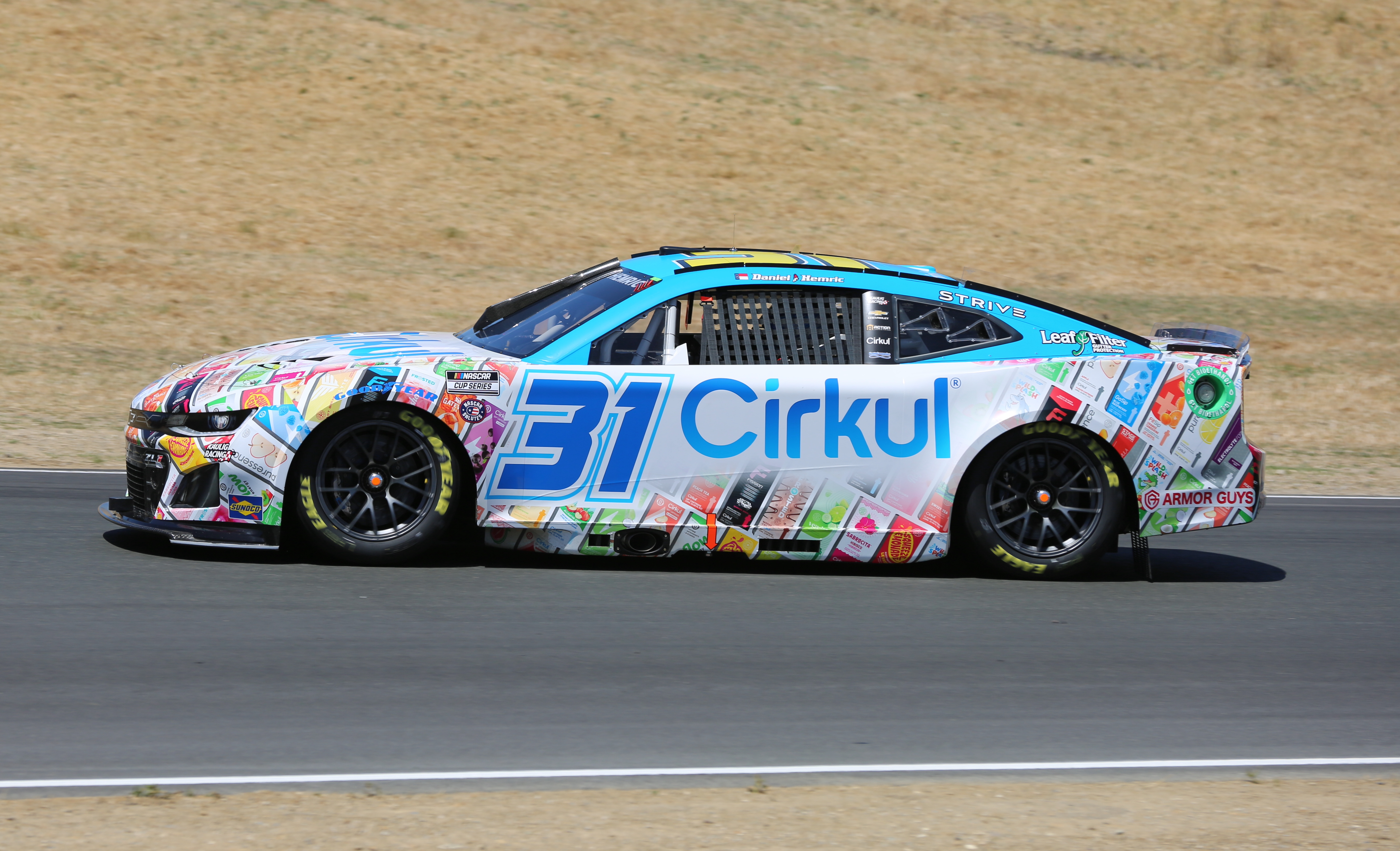
Daniel Hemric in the No. 31 at Sonoma in 2024

On September 15, 2023, Kaulig Racing announced that Daniel Hemric would drive the No. 31 in 2024. This would mark Hemric's first return to full-time Cup Series competition since his Rookie of the Year campaign in 2019.

==== Car No. 31 results ====
Year	Driver	No.	Make	1	2	3	4	5	6	7	8	9	10	11	12	13	14	15	16	17	18	19	20	21	22	23	24	25	26	27	28	29	30	31	32	33	34	35	36	Owners	Pts
2022	Justin Haley	31	Chevy	DAY; 23	CAL; 23	LVS; 17	PHO; 17	ATL; 11	COA; 15	RCH; 29	MAR; 31	BRD; 14	TAL; 12	DOV; 11	DAR; 3	KAN; 35	CLT; 27	GTW; 14	SON; 12	NSH; 23	ROA; 24	ATL; 7	NHA; 20	POC; 21	IRC; 19	MCH; 17	RCH; 21	GLN; 18	DAY; 28	DAR; 19	KAN; 19	BRI; 12	TEX; 3	TAL; 15	ROV; 5	LVS; 14	HOM; 28	MAR; 27	PHO; 27	22nd	699
2023	Justin Haley	31	Chevy	DAY; 32	CAL; 21	LVS; 8	PHO; 27	ATL; 22	COA; 19	RCH; 29	BRD; 6	MAR; 28	TAL; 19	DOV; 23	KAN; 18	DAR; 8	CLT; 15	GTW; 16	SON; 21	NSH; 23	CSC; 2	ATL; 8	NHA; 17	POC; 33	RCH; 30	MCH; 23	IRC; 38	GLN; 24	DAY; 21	DAR; 24	KAN; 21	BRI; 35	TEX; 13	TAL; 6	ROV; 22	LVS; 22	HOM; 23	MAR; 30	PHO; 29	26th	593
2024	Daniel Hemric	31	Chevy	DAY; 16	ATL; 18	LVS; 19	PHO; 28	BRI; 28	COA; 37	RCH; 30	MAR; 28	TEX; 20	TAL; 9	DOV; 9	KAN; 30	DAR; 33	CLT; 18	GTW; 18	SON; 28	IOW; 29	NHA; 31	NSH; 9	CSC; 12	POC; 25	IND; 30	RCH; 30	MCH; 23	DAY; 9	DAR; 29	ATL; 11	GLN; 31	BRI; 19	KAN; 20	TAL; 38	ROV; 24	LVS; 19	HOM; 29	MAR; 17	PHO; 23	30th	515

== Xfinity Series ==
Kaulig Racing began its Xfinity Series operations in 2016. On October 28, 2025, the team announced it will pause its Xfinity program after the 2025 season to focus on the Cup Series and Truck Series.

=== Car No. 10 history ===
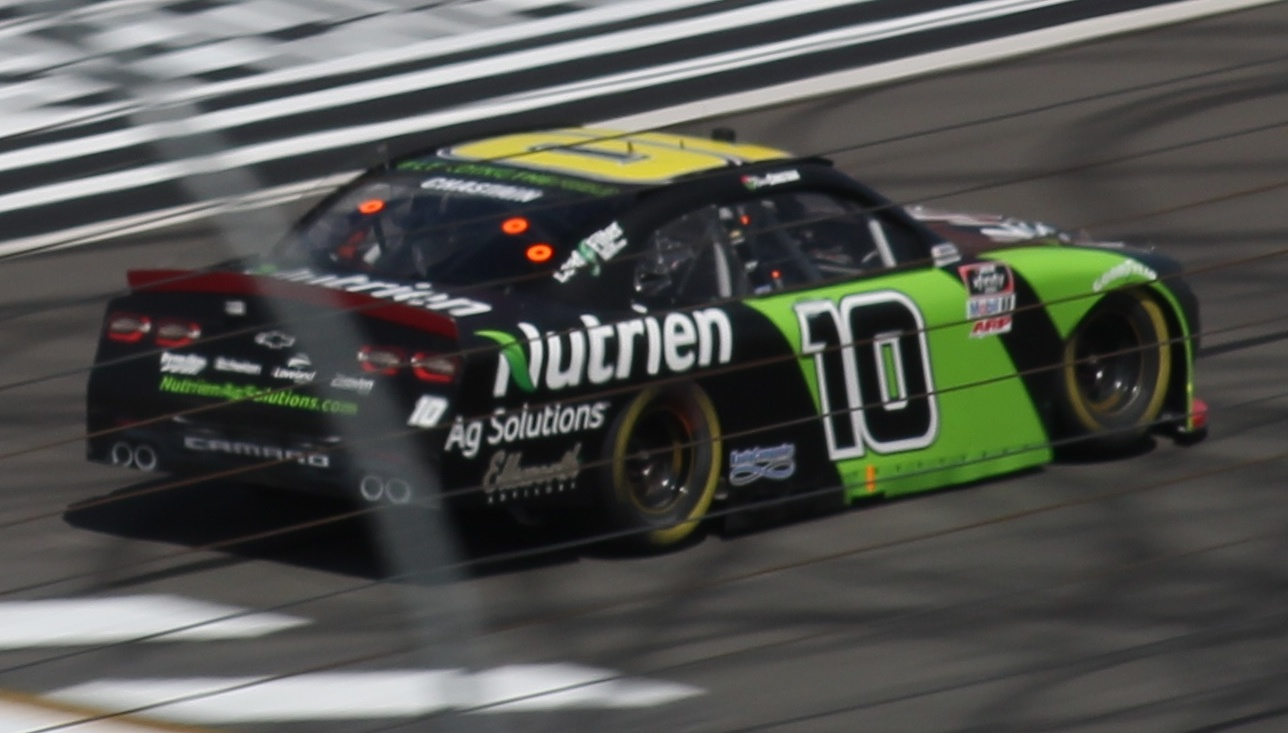
Ross Chastain in the No. 10 at Pocono Raceway in 2020

Part-time (2018–2019)

In 2018, Austin Dillon drove the 10 Car for one race at Indianapolis Motor Speedway. He would finish 8th in the race. On January 31, 2019, Kaulig Racing announced that Ross Chastain would drive the No. 10 car for three races from Daytona, Chicagoland, and Texas. Dillon returned to the team for the Las Vegas spring race, while Elliott Sadler, who had retired from full-time racing after the 2018 season, drove the No. 10 at Richmond and the fall Vegas event. A. J. Allmendinger joined the team on March 21 for a five-race schedule at Daytona, Watkins Glen, Mid-Ohio, Road America, and the Charlotte Roval. At the 2019 Circle K Firecracker 250 at Daytona, Allmendinger finished third, but was disqualified after a post-race vacuum inspection revealed a discrepancy in his car's engine. Allmendinger was once again disqualified at the 2019 Zippo 200 at The Glen at Watkins Glen International on August 3, 2019, when his second-place finishing car was discovered to be too low on both rear corners during post-race inspection. He held off Tyler Reddick to win at the Charlotte Roval, scoring Kaulig Racing's second win of the season. Days before the Kansas race, the No. 10's hauler lost control on a North Carolina highway and crashed, leaving the hauler's drivers injured and the race car damaged.

Ross Chastain (2020)

The team would run full-time in 2020 with Alex Yontz as crew chief. On October 15, 2019, it was announced that the driver, competing full-time for the Xfinity Series championship, would be Ross Chastain. It was also announced a month later that his replacement in 2021 would be Jeb Burton, moving over from JR Motorsports. Despite not winning a race and failing to qualify for the team at Daytona, Chastain finished a career-best seventh in the final standings in Kaulig's No. 10, including five runner-ups, and 27 top-tens (the most out of all drivers that season). Chastain would depart from the team and series after 2020 to replace Matt Kenseth in Chip Ganassi Racing's No. 42 Cup car in 2021. Jeb Burton would replace him for the 2021 season.

Jeb Burton (2021)

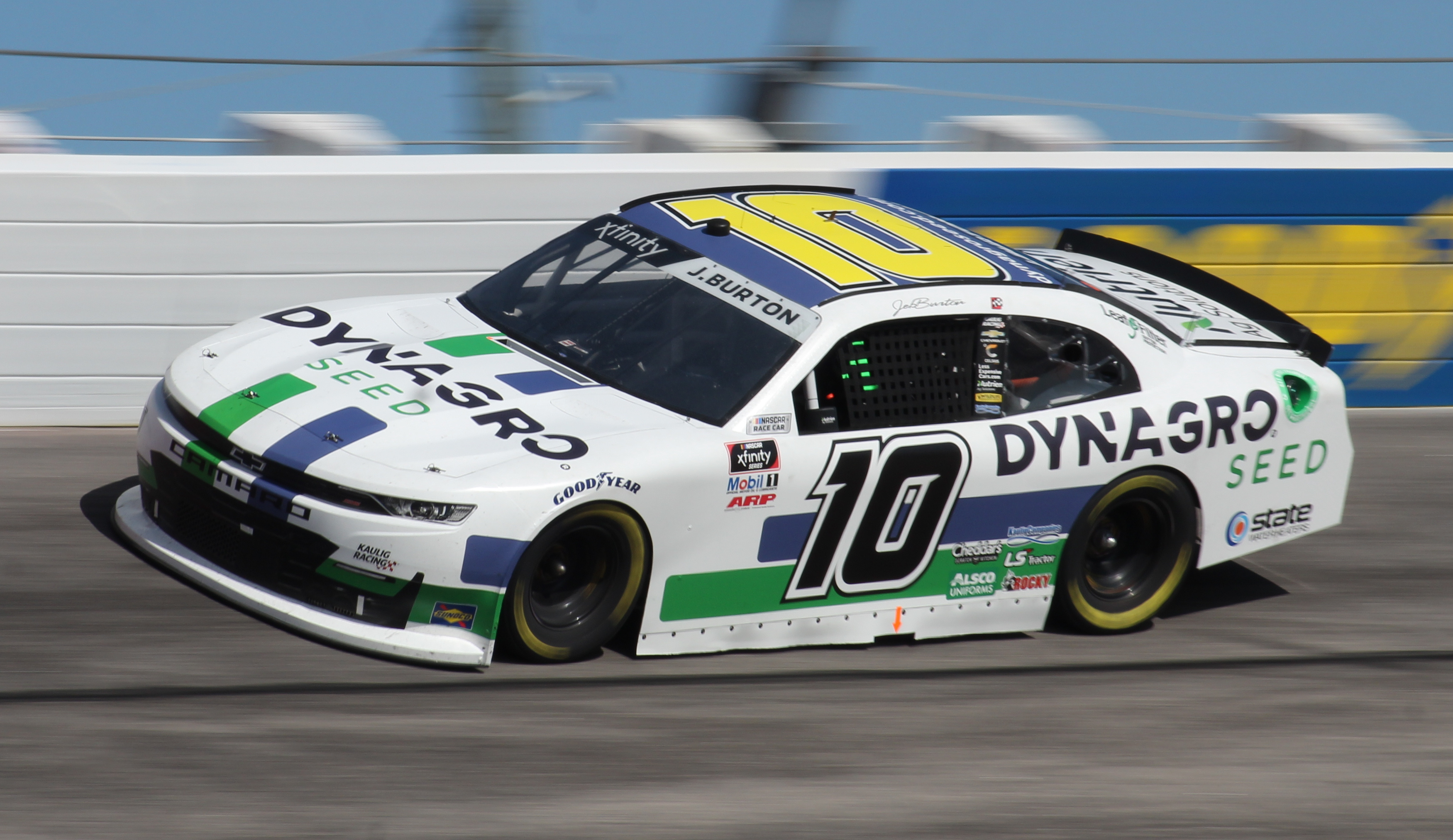
Jeb Burton in the No. 10 at Darlington Raceway in 2021

On April 24, 2021, Burton recorded his first career victory at Talladega after taking the lead from his cousin Harrison Burton in lap 82 and staying in front with 23 laps left after a caution caused by a seven-car wreck before NASCAR called the race finished due to heavy rain. It was also the second career victory for Kaulig's No. 10. Despite this, Kaulig Racing confirmed on September 21 that Burton's primary sponsor, Nutrien Ag Solutions, would depart from the team after the season and leave NASCAR entirely amid executive changes at the company. On October 11, Burton announced that he would not return to Kaulig Racing in 2022. He finished 11th in the final standings.

Landon Cassill (2022)

On December 9, 2021, Kaulig Racing announced Landon Cassill as Burton's replacement in the No. 10, with Cassill moving over from JD Motorsports alongside sponsor Voyager Digital, which signed a two-year extension with Cassill after beginning to sponsor him in 2021.

Multiple drivers (2023)

On January 18, 2023, Cassill announced he would not return to the No. 10 full-time for 2023 as a result of his sponsor, Voyager Digital, filing for bankruptcy in July 2022. Kaulig has since announced the No. 10 entries will be an "All-Star Car" with cup drivers. So far, Kaulig Cup drivers Justin Haley and A. J. Allmendinger as well as affiliate driver Austin Dillon have been announced as drivers. Kyle Busch drove the car at Las Vegas and Phoenix. Kyle Larson took the car to victory lane at Darlington. Allmendinger scored wins at Circuit of the Americas and Nashville. On September 6, 2023, it was announced that Daniel Hemric would move from the No. 11 Chevy to the No. 10 starting at Kansas through the end of the season, as the No. 11 is unlikely to clinch a playoff spot in the owner's championship, while the No. 10 had already clinched a spot. Hemric was eliminated at the conclusion of the Charlotte Roval race, however the No. 10 car did advance to the next round to fight for the owner's title.

Daniel Dye (2024–2025)

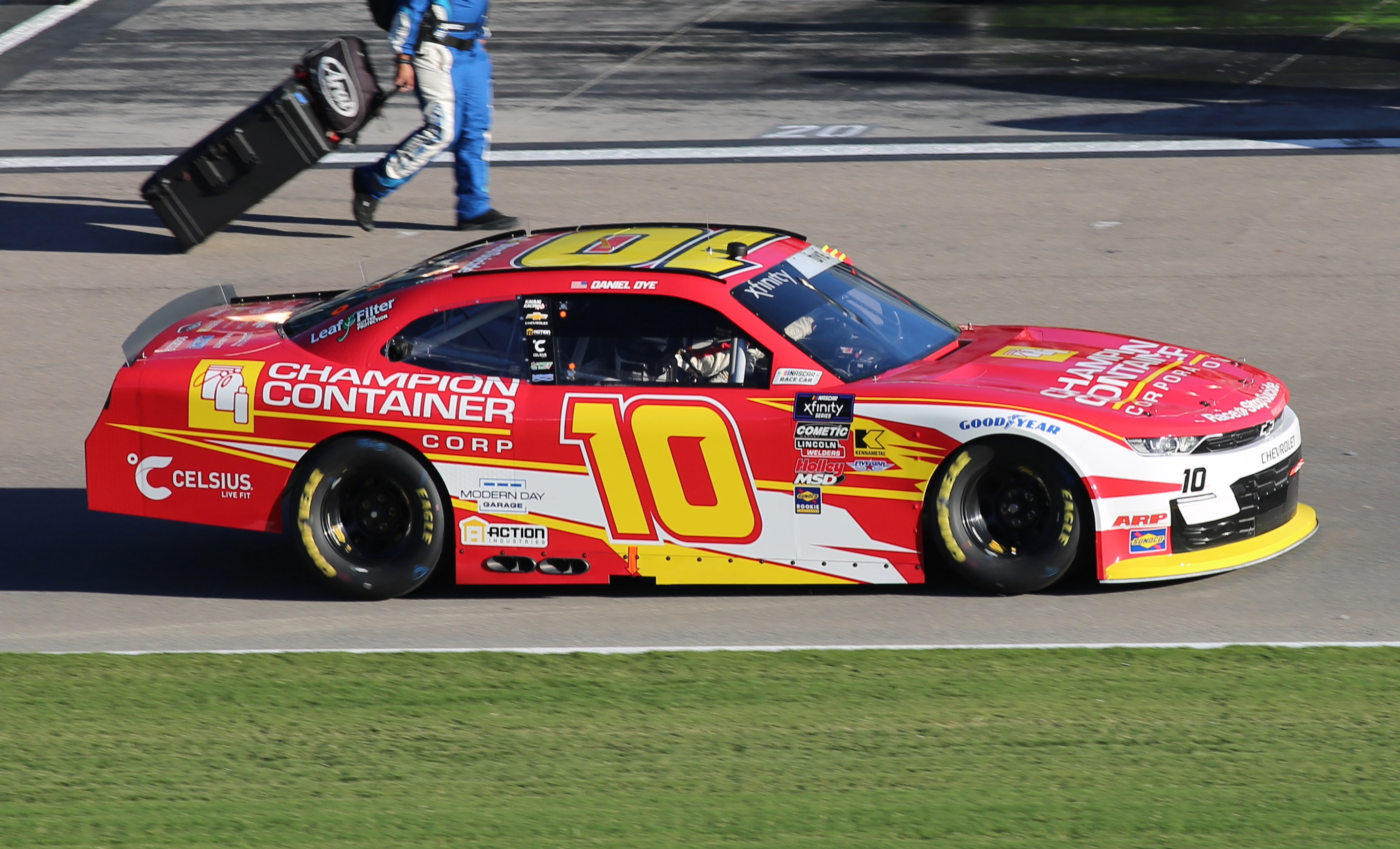
Daniel Dye in the No. 10 at Las Vegas in 2025

In 2024, Kaulig fielded the No. 10 car part-time for Daniel Dye.

On August 23, 2024, Kaulig Racing announced that Dye will pilot the No. 10 full-time for 2025.

==== Car No. 10 results ====
Year	Driver	No.	Make	1	2	3	4	5	6	7	8	9	10	11	12	13	14	15	16	17	18	19	20	21	22	23	24	25	26	27	28	29	30	31	32	33	NXSC	Pts
2018	Austin Dillon	10	Chevy	DAY	ATL	LVS	PHO	CAL	TEX	BRI	RCH	TAL	DOV	CLT	POC	MCH	IOW	CHI	DAY	KEN	NHA	IOW	GLN	MOH	BRI	ROA	DAR	IND; 8	LVS	RCH	ROV	DOV	KAN	TEX	PHO	HOM	45th	30
2019	Ross Chastain	10	Chevy	DAY; 13	ATL							TAL; 30	DOV					CHI; 8															KAN; 10	TEX; 2	PHO	HOM	25th	412
2019	Austin Dillon	10	Chevy			LVS; 4	PHO	CAL	TEX	BRI				CLT; 28	POC; 10	MCH	IOW											IND; 34									25th	412
2019	Elliott Sadler	10	Chevy								RCH; 12																		LVS; 10	RCH							25th	412
2019	A. J. Allmendinger	10	Chevy																DAY; 38	KEN	NHA	IOW	GLN; 37*	MOH; 3		ROA; 24	DAR				CLT; 1	DOV					25th	412
2019	Joe Graf Jr.	10	Chevy																						BRI; DNQ												25th	412
2020	Ross Chastain	10	Chevy	DAY; DNQ	LVS; 10	CAL; 8	PHO; 9	DAR; 8	CLT; 4	BRI; 28	ATL; 7	HOM; 9	HOM; 3	TAL; 2*	POC; 2*	IRC; 6	KEN; 3	KEN; 4	TEX; 9	KAN; 5	ROA; 7	DRC; 36	DOV; 3	DOV; 2	DAY; 6	DAR; 2	RCH; 5	RCH; 3	BRI; 2	LVS; 16	TAL; 6	ROV; 5	KAN; 12	TEX; 16	MAR; 5	PHO; 7	7th	2270
2021	Jeb Burton	10	Chevy	DAY; 4	DRC; 5	HOM; 4	LVS; 10	PHO; 6	ATL; 25	MAR; 11	TAL; 1	DAR; 20	DOV; 11	COA; 10	CLT; 9	MOH; 16	TEX; 32	NSH; 7	POC; 8	ROA; 14	ATL; 2	NHA; 11	GLN; 8	IRC; 23	MCH; 29	DAY; 4	DAR; 5	RCH; 10	BRI; 24	LVS; 36	TAL; 7	ROV; 13	TEX; 11	KAN; 12	MAR; 37	PHO; 23	11th	2161
2022	Landon Cassill	10	Chevy	DAY; 14	CAL; 38	LVS; 6	PHO; 9	ATL; 5	COA; 31	RCH; 15	MAR; 2	TAL; 5	DOV; 12	DAR; 6	TEX; 10	CLT; 29	PIR; 15	NSH; 18	ROA; 32	ATL; 8	NHA; 37	POC; 11	IRC; 11	MCH; 10	GLN; 16	DAY; 23	DAR; 12	KAN; 13	BRI; 35	TEX; 33	TAL; 3	CLT; 10	LVS; 11	HOM; 12	MAR; 37	PHO; 4	13th	779
2023	Justin Haley	10	Chevy	DAY; 10				ATL; 10							CLT; 12					ATL; 4							DAY; 10										7th	2227
2023	Austin Dillon	10	Chevy		CAL; 8																NHA; 16																7th	2227
2023	Kyle Busch	10	Chevy			LVS; 4	PHO; 9																			GLN; 27		DAR; 9									7th	2227
2023	A. J. Allmendinger	10	Chevy						COA; 1								SON; 2	NSH; 1					ROA; 9		IRC; 3												7th	2227
2023	Derek Kraus	10	Chevy							RCH; 10	MAR; 8	TAL; 27	DOV; 20																								7th	2227
2023	Kyle Larson	10	Chevy											DAR; 1																							7th	2227
2023	Jordan Taylor	10	Chevy													PIR; 27																					7th	2227
2023	Justin Marks	10	Chevy																CSC; 38																		7th	2227
2023	Daniel Suárez	10	Chevy																			POC; 10															7th	2227
2023	Ross Chastain	10	Chevy																					MCH; 7													7th	2227
2023	Daniel Hemric	10	Chevy																										KAN; 34	BRI; 2	TEX; 24	ROV; 7	LVS; 9	HOM; 6	MAR; 6	PHO; 21	7th	2227
2024	Daniel Dye	10	Chevy	DAY; 27	ATL	LVS	PHO	COA	RCH	MAR	TEX; 24	TAL	DOV; 20	DAR	CLT	PIR	SON	IOW; 10	NHA	NSH	CSC	POC; 17	IND; 7	MCH; 34	DAY	DAR	ATL	GLN	BRI	KAN; 34	TAL	ROV	LVS; 12	HOM	MAR	PHO; 17	40th	168
2025	Daniel Dye	10	Chevy	DAY; 38	ATL; 7	COA; 17	PHO; 19	LVS; 12	HOM; 9	MAR; 7	DAR; 17	BRI; 13	CAR; 9	TAL; 10	TEX; 11	CLT; 31	NSH; 38	MXC; 13	POC; 31	ATL; 8	CSC; 19	SON; 34	DOV; 21	IND; 8	IOW; 38	GLN; 17	DAY; 35	PIR; 11	GTW; 10	BRI; 26	KAN; 12	ROV; 36	LVS; 17	TAL; 25	MAR; 33	PHO; 28	22nd	604

=== Car No. 11 history ===
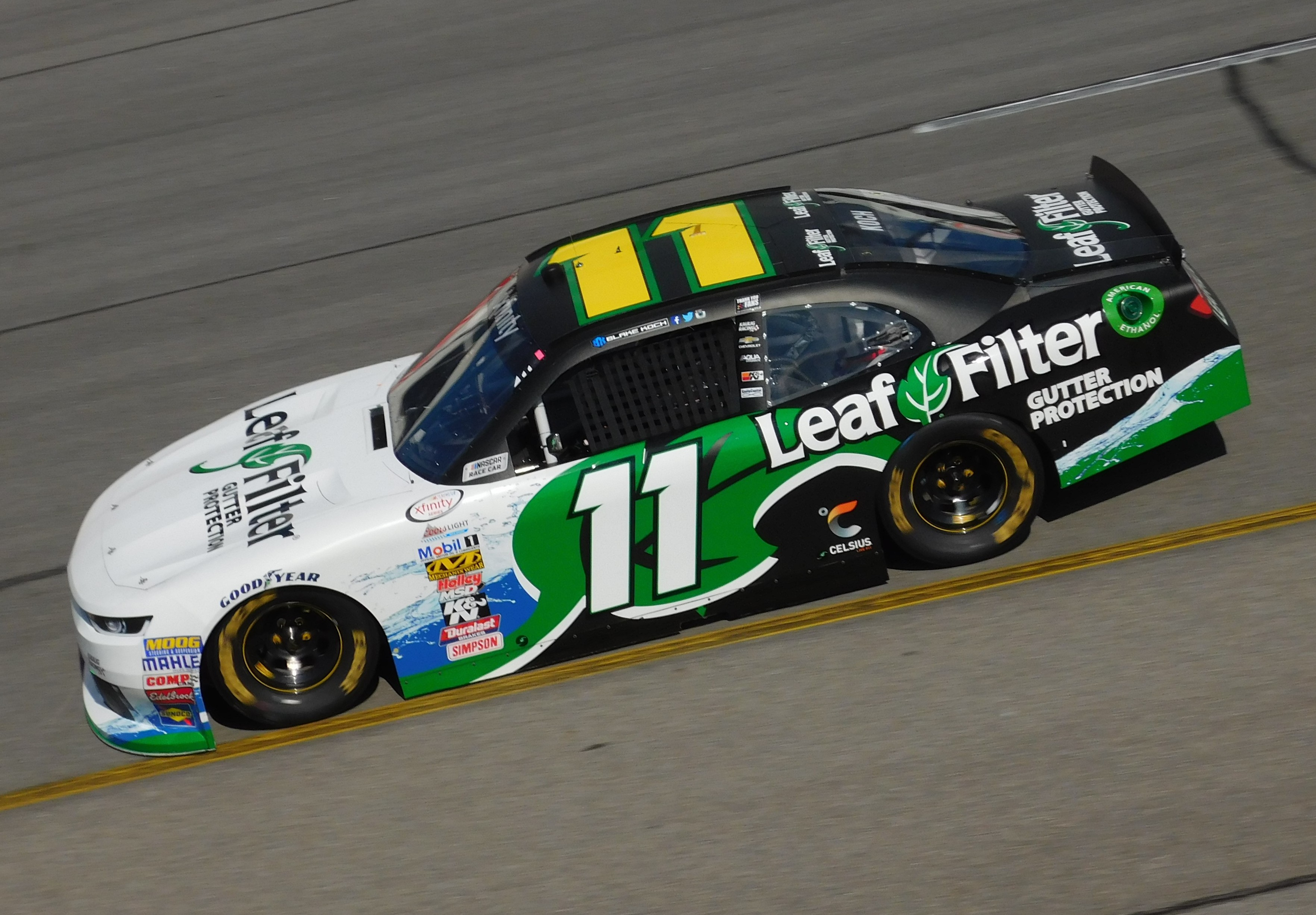
Blake Koch in the No. 11 at Richmond Raceway in 2017

Blake Koch (2016–2017)

In June 2015, Blake Koch announced he and longtime sponsor LeafFilter Gutter Protection would re-sign with TriStar Motorsports for the 2016 season. However, in the 2015 offseason, LeafFilter owner Matt Kaulig decided to start his own team, Kaulig Racing. He brought along Koch, whom he had sponsored the past two seasons, to pilot the No. 11 Chevy. Longtime NASCAR crew chief Chris Rice was hired as the team's general manager and crew chief. Kaulig Racing formed a technical alliance with Richard Childress Racing for the 2016 season. The team also used the owner's points of TriStar's former No. 8 team. In the team's debut, they finished 9th at Daytona after a strong showing, followed by a twentieth-place finish at Atlanta the following week. For the team's third race, Koch was running solidly in the top fifteen before mechanical problems relegated him to a 26th-place finish six laps down. At Fontana, Koch finished 12th and on the lead lap, after running in the top 10 for much of the day. The team would later have several top-10 and top-fifteen runs, enough to get into the new Xfinity Chase, and also made it to the 2nd round as well, but was unable to get to the final round, as he missed out by seven points after finishing a strong eighth after running in or near the top-five all day. Blake finished seventh in the points, a career best for Koch.

Ryan Truex (2018)

On January 9, 2018, Kaulig Racing announced that they parted ways with Koch and had signed Camping World Truck Series driver Ryan Truex to drive the No. 11. Truex finished seventh in his team's debut. Truex was also mediocre, with only one top-five all year and an average finish of 14.0.

Justin Haley (2019–2021)

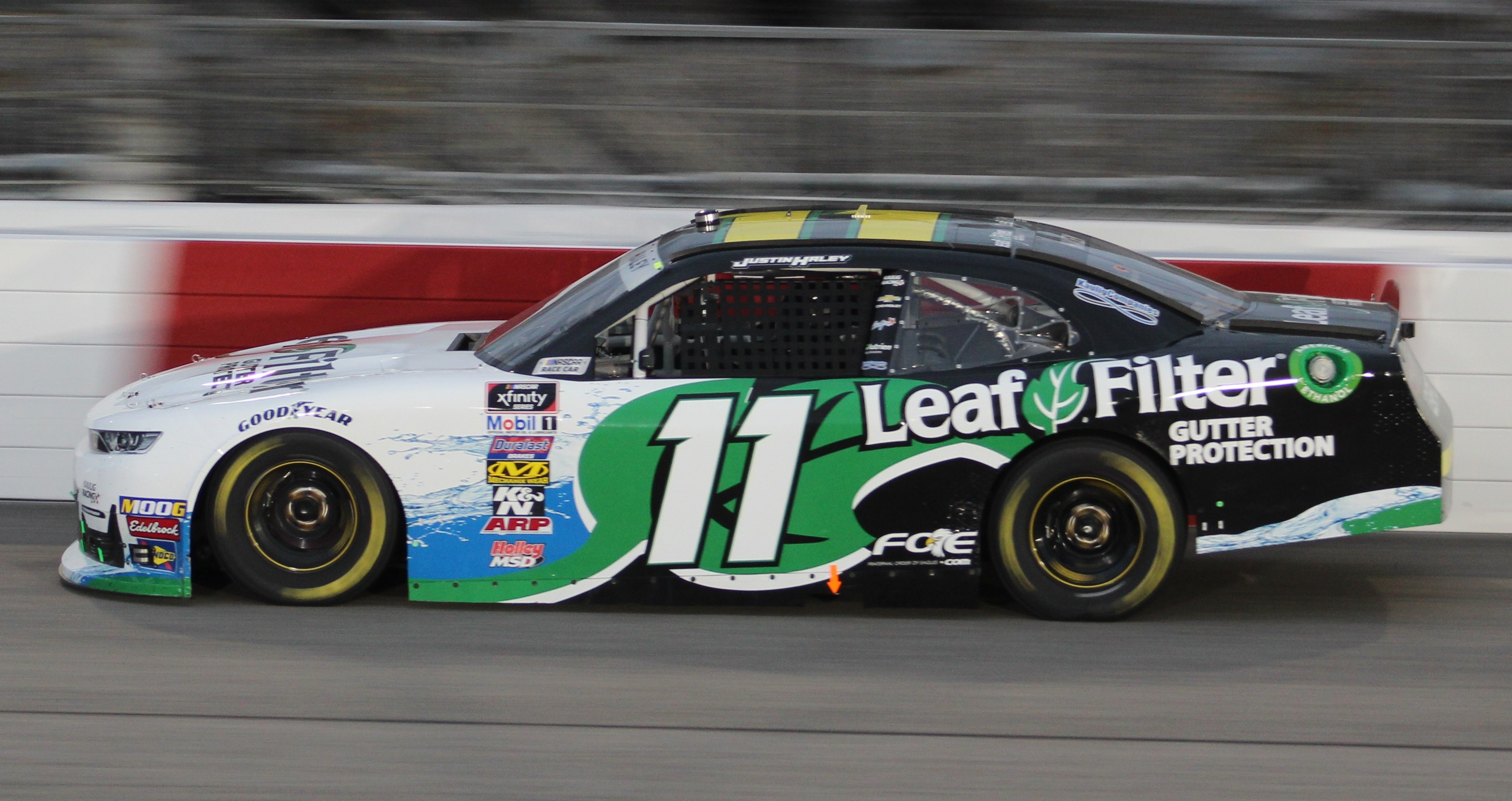
Justin Haley in the No. 11 car at Richmond Raceway in 2019

After the 2018 season, the team announced on December 1, 2018, that Truex would be replaced by NASCAR Truck series title contender Justin Haley, who would compete for Sunoco Rookie of the Year honors in 2019. Haley would finish twelfth in the points standings in 2019, but the next year scored three wins at both Talladega races and the summer Daytona race and wound up making the Final 4 round of the playoffs, finishing a team-best third in the points standings. In October 2020, Haley was confirmed to drive the car again in 2021. In his third year driving for Kaulig, Haley won the summer Daytona race and advanced to the Round of 8 in the playoffs. However, a DNF in the cutoff race at Martinsville prevented Haley from reaching the Final 4.

Daniel Hemric (2022–2023)

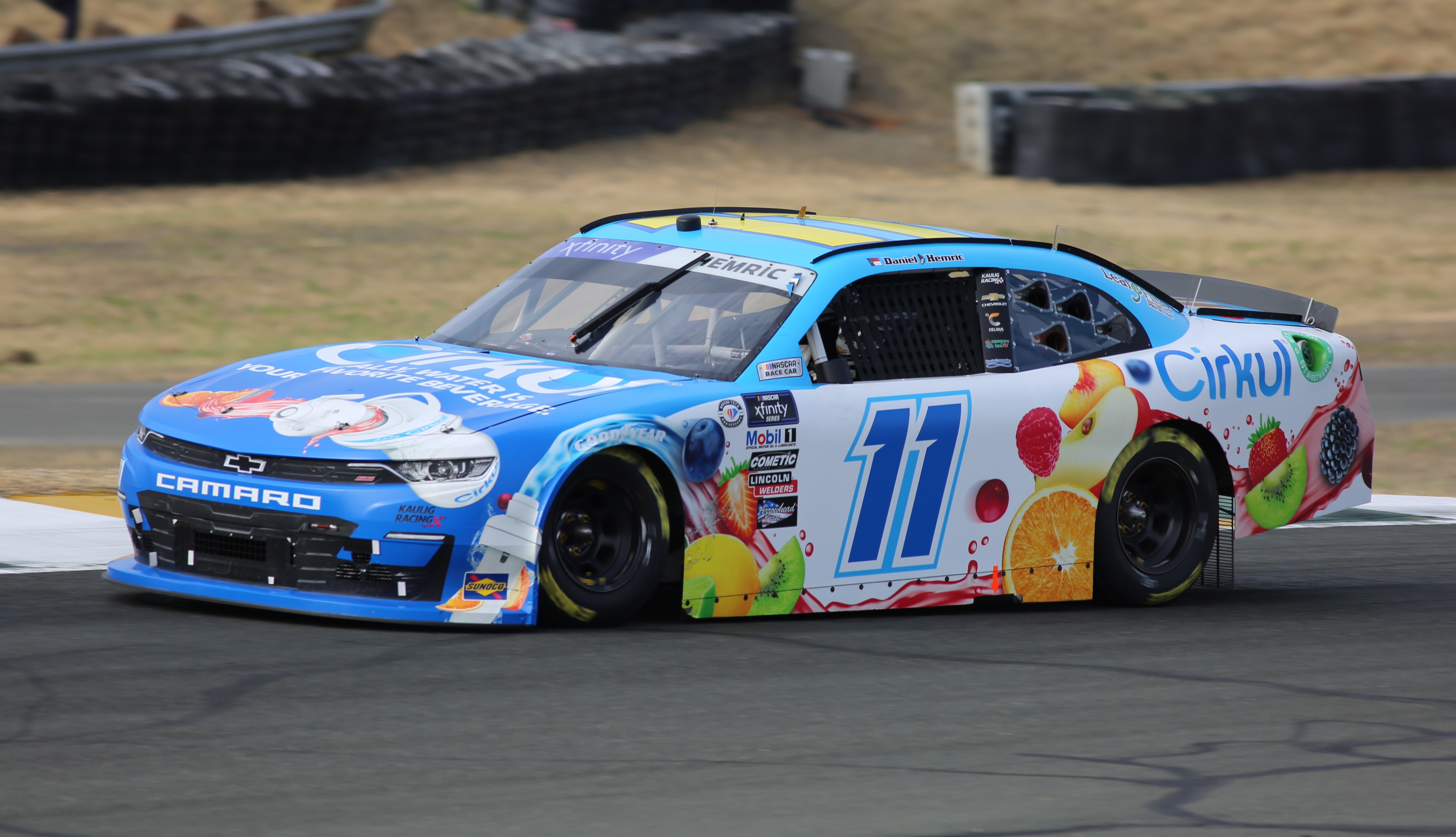
Daniel Hemric in the No. 11 at Sonoma Raceway in 2023

With Kaulig Racing expanding to the Cup Series full-time with a two-car team and Haley as one of its drivers, on September 25, 2021, Daniel Hemric (who would later win the series championship) was announced to pilot the No. 11 in 2022. On September 6, 2023, it was announced that Daniel Hemric would move from the No. 11 Chevy to the No. 10 starting at Kansas through the end of the season, as the No. 11 was unlikely to clinch a playoff spot in the owner's championship, while the No. 10 has already clinched a spot. Derek Kraus, Layne Riggs, and Jordan Taylor split driving duties of the No. 11 for the rest of the season.

Josh Williams (2024–2025)

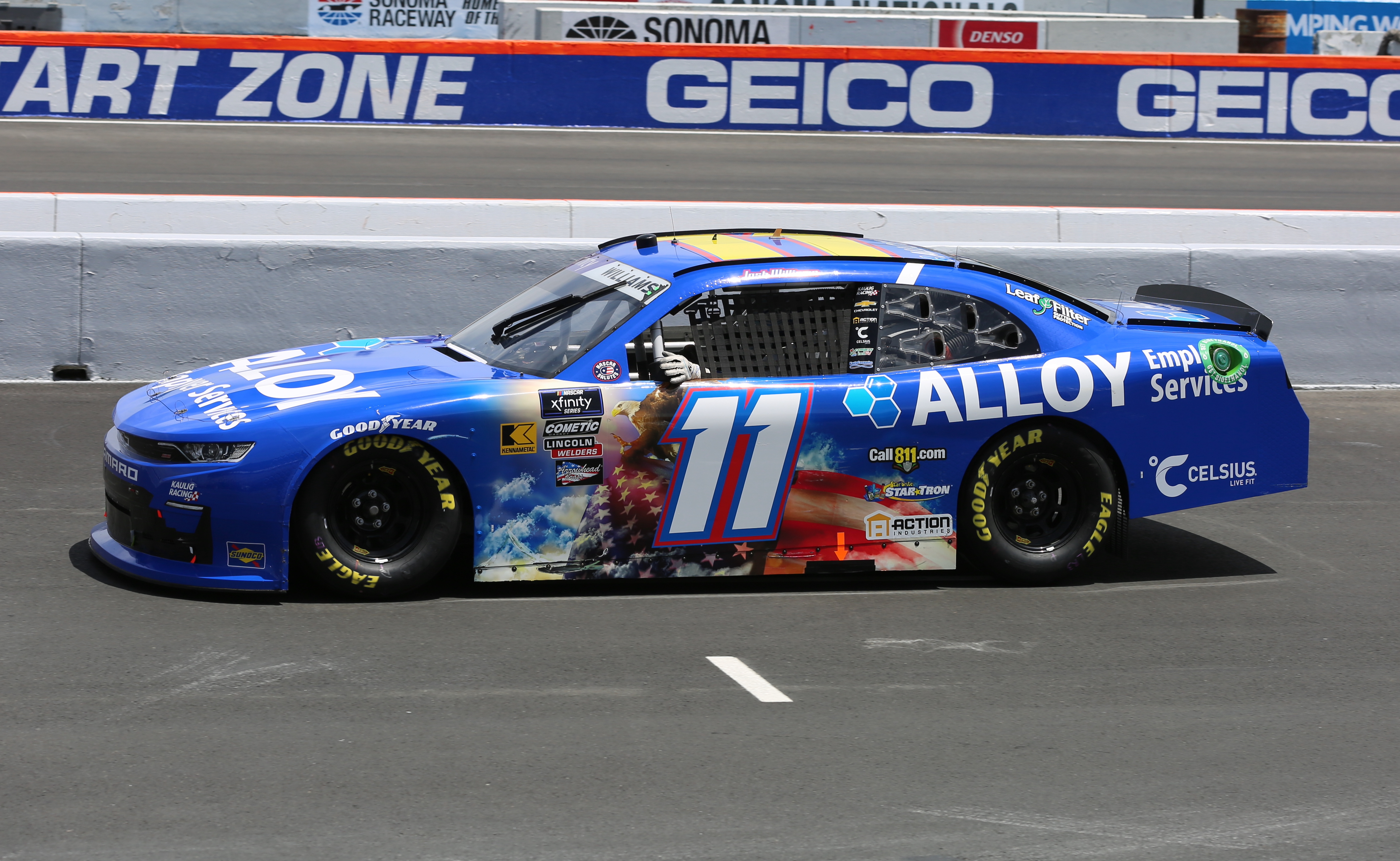
Josh Williams in the No. 11 at Sonoma Raceway in 2024

On November 16, 2023, it was announced that Josh Williams will drive the No. 11 car for the 2024 season.

Williams started the 2025 season in the No. 11 car; however, on July 30, 2025, Kaulig Racing and Williams agreed to part ways after 21 races. Multiple drivers were used through the final twelve races of the year: Carson Hocevar replaced Williams at Iowa. Michael McDowell, Justin Haley, Will Brown, Daniel Hemric and Brenden Queen also competed for the team.

==== Car No. 11 results ====
Year	Driver	No.	Make	1	2	3	4	5	6	7	8	9	10	11	12	13	14	15	16	17	18	19	20	21	22	23	24	25	26	27	28	29	30	31	32	33	NXSC	Pts
2016	Blake Koch	11	Chevy	DAY; 9	ATL; 20	LVS; 26	PHO; 16	CAL; 12	TEX; 34	BRI; 37	RCH; 8	TAL; 24	DOV; 12	CLT; 14	POC; 15	MCH; 13	IOW; 13	DAY; 22	KEN; 14	NHA; 32	IND; 15	IOW; 13	GLN; 35	MOH; 12	BRI; 8	ROA; 18	DAR; 19	RCH; 15	CHI; 15	KEN; 11	DOV; 14	CLT; 12	KAN; 9	TEX; 14	PHO; 8	HOM; 20	16th	796
2017	Blake Koch	11	Chevy	DAY; 15	ATL; 40	LVS; 12	PHO; 13	CAL; 12	TEX; 16	BRI; 9	RCH; 11	TAL; 31	CLT; 19	DOV; 32	POC; 27	MCH; 17	IOW; 25	DAY; 38	KEN; 23	NHA; 13	IND; 17	IOW; 8	GLN; 22	MOH; 11	BRI; 14	ROA; 7	DAR; 11	RCH; 11	CHI; 9	KEN; 17	DOV; 19	CLT; 25	KAN; 23	TEX; 13	PHO; 6	HOM; 16	15th	698
2018	Ryan Truex	11	Chevy	DAY; 7	ATL; 9	LVS; 15	PHO; 15	CAL; 12	TEX; 13	BRI; 10	RCH; 7	TAL; 38	DOV; 11	CLT; 6	POC; 10	MCH; 10	IOW; 14	CHI; 15	DAY; 13	KEN; 13	NHA; 13	IOW; 8	GLN; 18	MOH; 5	BRI; 22	ROA; 25	DAR; 15	IND; 22	LVS; 8	RCH; 11	ROV; 16	DOV; 10	KAN; 11	TEX; 33	PHO; 13	HOM; 15	14th	868
2019	Justin Haley	11	Chevy	DAY; 17	ATL; 8	LVS; 10	PHO; 12	CAL; 10	TEX; 7	BRI; 7	RCH; 10	TAL; 7	DOV; 17	CLT; 5	POC; 9	MCH; 10	IOW; 13	CHI; 7	DAY; 2	KEN; 10	NHA; 13	IOW; 8	GLN; 14	MOH; 9	BRI; 34	ROA; 6	DAR; 11	IND; 5	LVS; 15	RCH; 17	ROV; 31	DOV; 4	KAN; 7	TEX; 32	PHO; 7	HOM; 33	11th	2155
2020	Justin Haley	11	Chevy	DAY; 6	LVS; 12	CAL; 5	PHO; 5	DAR; 10	CLT; 29	BRI; 17	ATL; 3	HOM; 13	HOM; 6	TAL; 1	POC; 23	IRC; 2	KEN; 7	KEN; 3	TEX; 8	KAN; 6	ROA; 11	DRC; 38	DOV; 8	DOV; 12	DAY; 1	DAR; 13	RCH; 2	RCH; 6	BRI; 16	LVS; 10	TAL; 1	ROV; 35	KAN; 4	TEX; 7	MAR; 12	PHO; 8	3rd	4029
2021	Justin Haley	11	Chevy	DAY; 29	DRC; 9	HOM; 6	LVS; 8	PHO; 26	ATL; 8	MAR; 8	TAL; 8	DAR; 14		COA; 9	CLT; 19	MOH; 2	TEX; 9	NSH; 19	POC; 38	ROA; 10	ATL; 4	NHA; 6	GLN; 9	IRC; 3	MCH; 17	DAY; 1	DAR; 4	RCH; 2	BRI; 6	LVS; 9	TAL; 6	ROV; 4	TEX; 7	KAN; 4	MAR; 33	PHO; 5	7th	2243
2021	Zane Smith	11	Chevy										DOV; 36																								7th	2243
2022	Daniel Hemric	11	Chevy	DAY; 28*	CAL; 12	LVS; 3	PHO; 8	ATL; 35	COA; 25	RCH; 6	MAR; 13	TAL; 34	DOV; 11	DAR; 10	TEX; 11	CLT; 6	PIR; 6	NSH; 17	ROA; 29	ATL; 5	NHA; 35	POC; 9	IRC; 22	MCH; 8	GLN; 31	DAY; 19	DAR; 13	KAN; 15	BRI; 20	TEX; 30	TAL; 8	ROV; 17	LVS; 8	HOM; 4	MAR; 8	PHO; 8	10th	2219
2023	Daniel Hemric	11	Chevy	DAY; 36	CAL; 12	LVS; 10	PHO; 10	ATL; 2	COA; 6	RCH; 24	MAR; 7	TAL; 21	DOV; 10	DAR; 16	CLT; 22	PIR; 33	SON; 13	NSH; 8	CSC; 7	ATL; 2	NHA; 4	POC; 5	ROA; 11	MCH; 15	IRC; 27	GLN; 23	DAY; 3	DAR; 10									15th	898
2023	Derek Kraus	11	Chevy																										KAN; 8	BRI; 12				HOM; 11		PHO; 37	15th	898
2023	Layne Riggs	11	Chevy																												TEX; 19		LVS; 10		MAR; 11		15th	898
2023	Jordan Taylor	11	Chevy																													ROV; 16					15th	898
2024	Josh Williams	11	Chevy	DAY; 34	ATL; 37	LVS; 14	PHO; 27	COA; 38	RCH; 12	MAR; 10	TEX; 12	TAL; 20	DOV; 25	DAR; 21	CLT; 8	PIR; 7	SON; 37	IOW; 20	NHA; 23	NSH; 24	CSC; 12	POC; 18	IND; 36	MCH; 19	DAY; 11	DAR; 16	ATL; 8	GLN; 32	BRI; 21	KAN; 11	TAL; 34	ROV; 36	LVS; 15	HOM; 27	MAR; 17	PHO; 33	21st	515
2025	Josh Williams	11	Chevy	DAY; 20	ATL; 15	COA; 15	PHO; 12	LVS; 29	HOM; 19	MAR; 17	DAR; 36	BRI; 14	CAR; 7	TAL; 29	TEX; 37	CLT; 6	NSH; 17	MXC; 20	POC; 15	ATL; 38	CSC; 11	SON; 15	DOV; 27	IND; 22													21st	607
2025	Carson Hocevar	11	Chevy																						IOW; 6												21st	607
2025	Michael McDowell	11	Chevy																							GLN; 25											21st	607
2025	Justin Haley	11	Chevy																								DAY; 19										21st	607
2025	Will Brown	11	Chevy																									PIR; 35									21st	607
2025	Daniel Hemric	11	Chevy																										GTW; 7			ROV; 17	LVS; 16				21st	607
2025	Brenden Queen	11	Chevy																											BRI; 20	KAN; 9			TAL; 36	MAR; 35	PHO; 19	21st	607

=== Car No. 14 history ===
Justin Haley (2022)

On August 8, 2022, Kaulig Racing announced that Justin Haley would make his Xfinity Series return at Daytona in a newly established No. 14 car sponsored by DaaBin Store. Haley was up front for most of the race but finished 25th after wrecking out late during an overtime attempt. In 2024, Kaulig partnered with SS-Green Light Racing to field the No. 14 for Daniel Suárez. Suárez crashed and finished 35th.

==== Car No. 14 results ====
Year	Driver	No.	Make	1	2	3	4	5	6	7	8	9	10	11	12	13	14	15	16	17	18	19	20	21	22	23	24	25	26	27	28	29	30	31	32	33	NXSC	Pts
2022	Justin Haley	14	Chevy	DAY	CAL	LVS	PHO	ATL	COA	RCH	MAR	TAL	DOV	DAR	TEX	CLT	PIR	NSH	ROA	ATL	NHA	POC	IND	MCH	GLN	DAY; 25	DAR	KAN	BRI	TEX	TAL	ROV	LVS	HOM	MAR	PHO	49th	14
2024	Daniel Suárez	14	Chevy	DAY; 35	ATL	LVS	PHO	COA	RCH	MAR	TEX	TAL	DOV	DAR	CLT	PIR	SON	IOW	NHA	NSH	CSC	POC	IND	MCH	DAY	DAR	ATL	GLN	BRI	KAN	TAL	ROV	LVS	HOM	MAR	PHO	31st	388

=== Car No. 16 history ===
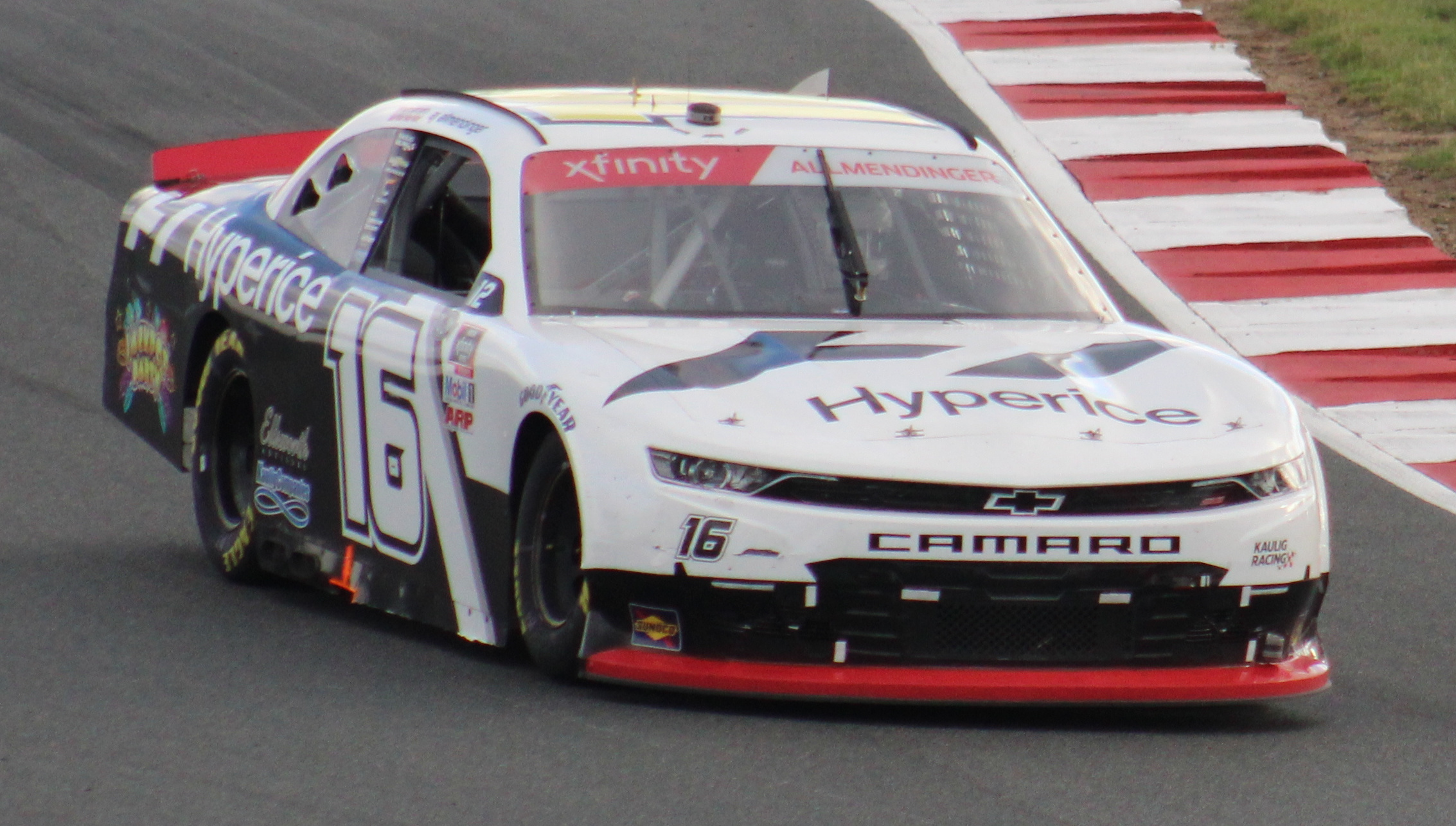
A. J. Allmendinger in the No. 16 at Charlotte Motor Speedway in 2021

Ross Chastain (2019)

On June 27, 2019, Kaulig announced Ross Chastain would drive a third car, the No. 16, at the 2019 Circle K Firecracker 250 at Daytona. After a grueling race at Daytona, Chastain led 49 laps, won stage one, and later went on to score Kaulig Racing's first win.

A. J. Allmendinger (2020–2022)

It was announced in early 2020 that A. J. Allmendinger will drive the No. 16 on a part-time basis starting at Daytona, in which he DNQ'd. Allmendinger won at Atlanta for the team, giving Kaulig Racing their third career win and their second with Allmendinger. Allmendinger would go on to win again that season at the Charlotte Roval for a second year in a row. On December 1, 2020, Kaulig announced Allmendinger would drive the No. 16 on a full-time basis for the 2021 Xfinity season.

In his first full-time season with Kaulig, Allmendinger scored wins at Las Vegas, Mid-Ohio, Michigan, and Bristol, and stayed consistent enough to clinch the Regular Season Championship. During the playoffs, Allmendinger won at the Charlotte Roval for Kaulig a third consecutive time, and made the Championship 4, finishing fourth in the final standings.

Allmendinger started the 2022 season with a second-place finish at Daytona. He racked up wins at Citcuit of the Americas, Portland, Indianapolis and Talladega, and stayed consistent enough to win his second consecutive Regular Season Championship. During the playoffs, Allmendinger would win back-to-back races at Talladega and the Charlotte Roval, making it four straight victories at the latter. However, subpar finishes at Las Vegas and Martinsville eliminated Allmendinger from competing for the Xfinity Championship at Phoenix. Allmendinger would finish fifth in the points standings.

Chandler Smith (2023)

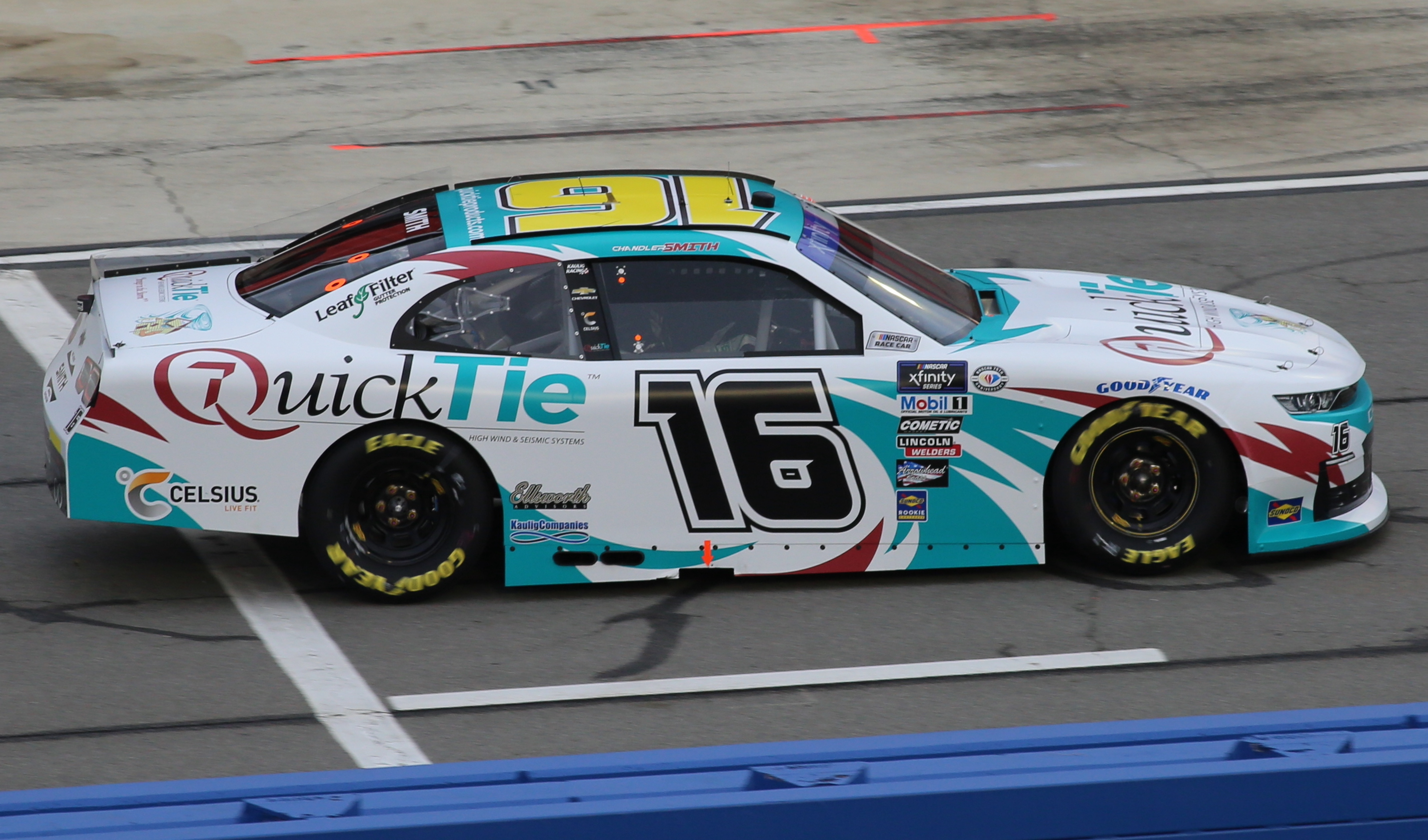
Smith at Auto Club Speedway in 2023

On October 5, 2022, Kaulig Racing announced that Chandler Smith would replace Allmendinger in the No. 16 in 2023, as Allmendinger would return to a full-time schedule in the Cup Series, Smith began the season with a 12th-place finish at Daytona. Two months later, he scored his first Xfinity win at Richmond.

A. J. Allmendinger (2024)

On December 7, 2023, it was announced that, after a year in Cup, Allmendinger would compete full-time in the Xfinity Series in 2024. Despite not winning a race during the regular season, he stayed consistent enough to make the playoffs. During the playoffs, Allmendinger won at Las Vegas to lock himself into the Championship 4.

Christian Eckes (2025)

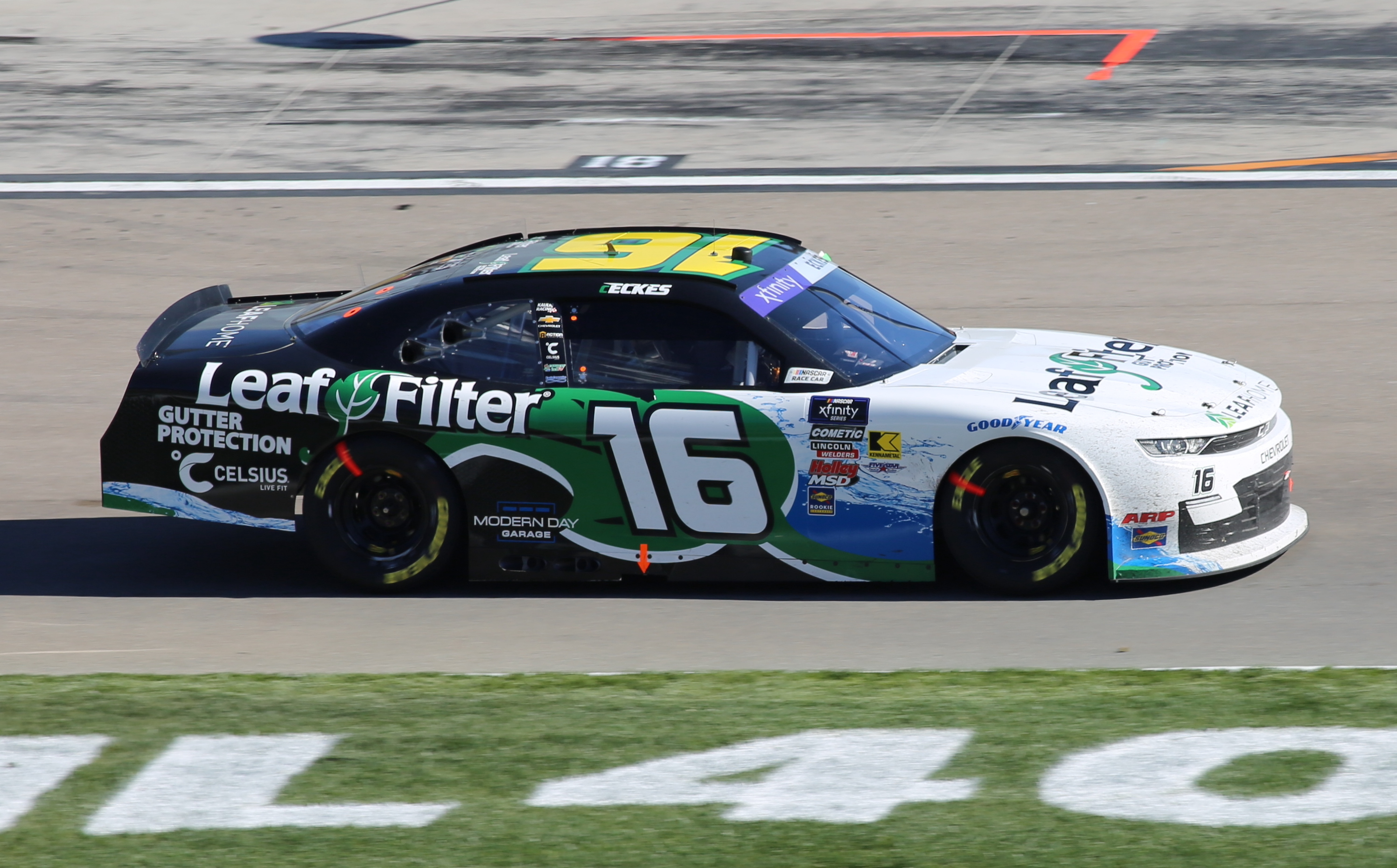
Christian Eckes in the No. 16 car at Las Vegas Motor Speedway in 2025

Christian Eckes was announced as the driver for the 2025 season on August 31, 2024, replacing Allmendinger, who returned to the Cup Series with Kaulig.

==== Car No. 16 results ====
Year	Driver	No.	Make	1	2	3	4	5	6	7	8	9	10	11	12	13	14	15	16	17	18	19	20	21	22	23	24	25	26	27	28	29	30	31	32	33	NXSC	Pts
2019	Ross Chastain	16	Chevy	DAY	ATL	LVS	PHO	CAL	TEX	BRI	RCH	TAL	DOV	CLT	POC	MCH	IOW	CHI	DAY; 1*	KEN	NHA	IOW	GLN	MOH	BRI	ROA	DAR	IND	LVS	RCH	ROV	DOV	KAN	TEX	PHO	HOM	42nd	59
2020	A. J. Allmendinger	16	Chevy	DAY; DNQ	LVS	CAL	PHO	DAR	CLT	BRI; 10	ATL; 1	HOM	HOM; 4	TAL; 7	POC	IRC; 4	KEN	KEN	TEX	KAN	ROA; 2	DRC; 4	DOV	DOV	DAY; 15*	DAR	RCH	RCH	BRI	LVS	TAL; 24	ROV; 1	KAN	TEX	MAR; 26	PHO	33rd	366
2021	A. J. Allmendinger	16	Chevy	DAY; 5	DRC; 35	HOM; 14	LVS; 1	PHO; 5	ATL; 5	MAR; 13	TAL; 3	DAR; 13	DOV; 4	COA; 2	CLT; 33	MOH; 1	TEX; 6	NSH; 5	POC; 5	ROA; 4*	ATL; 13	NHA; 12	GLN; 2	IRC; 2	MCH; 1*	DAY; 2*	DAR; 20	RCH; 18	BRI; 1	LVS; 7	TAL; 39	ROV; 1	TEX; 6	KAN; 3	MAR; 7	PHO; 14	4th	4023
2022	A. J. Allmendinger	16	Chevy	DAY; 2	CAL; 7	LVS; 9	PHO; 7	ATL; 3*	COA; 1*	RCH; 4	MAR; 3	TAL; 3	DOV; 6	DAR; 8	TEX; 9	CLT; 19	PIR; 1	NSH; 16	ROA; 6	ATL; 10	NHA; 20	POC; 4	IRC; 1*	MCH; 7	GLN; 2	DAY; 3	DAR; 3	KAN; 6	BRI; 6	TEX; 4	TAL; 1	ROV; 1*	LVS; 22	HOM; 3	MAR; 16	PHO; 5	5th	2333
2023	Chandler Smith	16	Chevy	DAY; 12	CAL; 4	LVS; 3*	PHO; 5	ATL; 28	COA; 12	RCH; 1*	MAR; 10	TAL; 25	DOV; 13	DAR; 36	CLT; 13	PIR; 9	SON; 14	NSH; 12*	CSC; 8	ATL; 20	NHA; 2	POC; 20	ROA; 37	MCH; 20	IRC; 34	GLN; 8	DAY; 22	DAR; 12	KAN; 32	BRI; 5	TEX; 4	ROV; 12	LVS; 4	HOM; 34	MAR; 36	PHO; 8	9th	2217
2024	A. J. Allmendinger	16	Chevy	DAY; 10	ATL; 13	LVS; 6	PHO; 18	COA; 10*	RCH; 14	MAR; 36	TEX; 4	TAL; 19	DOV; 6	DAR; 35	CLT; 5	PIR; 4	SON; 17	IOW; 37	NHA; 11	NSH; 7	CSC; 11	POC; 6	IND; 8	MCH; 10	DAY; 24*	DAR; 27	ATL; 3*	GLN; 3	BRI; 10	KAN; 17	TAL; 11	ROV; 2*	LVS; 1*	HOM; 10	MAR; 38	PHO; 9	3rd	4028
2025	Christian Eckes	16	Chevy	DAY; 12	ATL; 29	COA; 5	PHO; 8	LVS; 13	HOM; 38	MAR; 34	DAR; 7	BRI; 9	CAR; 23	TAL; 25	TEX; 38	CLT; 9	NSH; 35	MXC; 4	POC; 3	ATL; 19	CSC; 15	SON; 32	DOV; 10	IND; 13	IOW; 10	GLN; 8	DAY; 32	PIR; 4	GTW; 3	BRI; 8	KAN; 14	ROV; 10	LVS; 18	TAL; 4	MAR; 27	PHO; 16	14th	784

=== Car No. 97 history ===
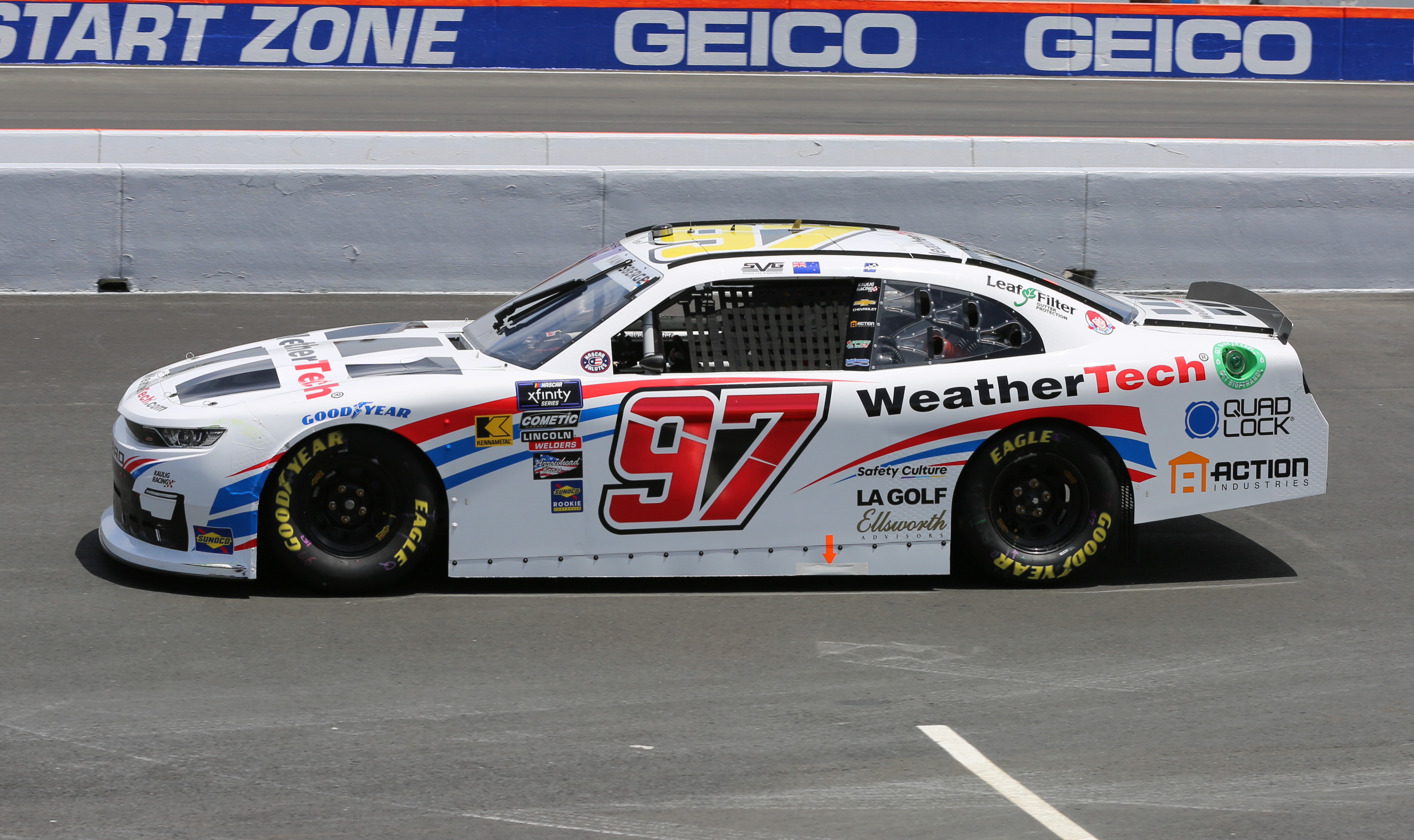
Shane van Gisbergen in the No. 97 at Sonoma Raceway in 2024

Shane van Gisbergen (2024)

On December 13, 2023, in alliance with Trackhouse Racing, it was announced that three-time Supercars champion, Shane van Gisbergen would drive for Kaulig full-time in 2024. Van Gisbergen started the season with a 12th place finish at Daytona. He scored his first two Xfinity Series wins in back-to-back races at Portland and Sonoma. Van Gisbergen earned his third Xfinity win at Chicago. He ended the season 12th in the points standings and moved to the Cup series full-time with Trackhouse in 2025.

==== Car No. 97 results ====
Year	Driver	No.	Make	1	2	3	4	5	6	7	8	9	10	11	12	13	14	15	16	17	18	19	20	21	22	23	24	25	26	27	28	29	30	31	32	33	NXSC	Pts
2024	Shane van Gisbergen	97	Chevy	DAY; 12	ATL; 3	LVS; 37	PHO; 6	COA; 27*	RCH; 14	MAR; 11	TEX; 18	TAL; 22	DOV; 18	DAR; 15	CLT; 15	PIR; 1	SON; 1*	IOW; 34	NHA; 18	NSH; 15	CSC; 1*	POC; 31	IND; 4	MCH; 17	DAY; 25	DAR; 7	ATL; 27	GLN; 5	BRI; 18	KAN; 8	TAL; 35	ROV; 3	LVS; 38	HOM; 17	MAR; 28	PHO; 12	12th	2157

== Craftsman Truck Series ==
On August 23, 2025, Kaulig Racing announced it will compete in the NASCAR Craftsman Truck Series for Ram Trucks in 2026, fielding up to five trucks, including the No. 10. This marks the first time since 2012 that a factory supported team will carry the Ram badge in NASCAR. The No. 10 was announced after being used as a show car. On October 16, 2025 Kaulig announced that 2025 ARCA Menards Series champion Brenden Queen had joined the team. On October 29, Kaulig announced that Justin Haley and Daniel Dye will join the Ram Trucks roster. On November 17, Ram Trucks announced a "Free Agent Program" for the No. 25 truck for the 2026 season. While the drivers will not be competing for the championship, they will be eligible to win a prize from Ram Trucks at the end of the season, based on their individual track performance. On December 4, Kaulig announced its Truck Series numbers. On January 9, 2026, Kaulig announced the reality competition "Race for the Seat" to determine the team's final driver.

=== Truck No. 10 history ===
Corey LaJoie (2026)

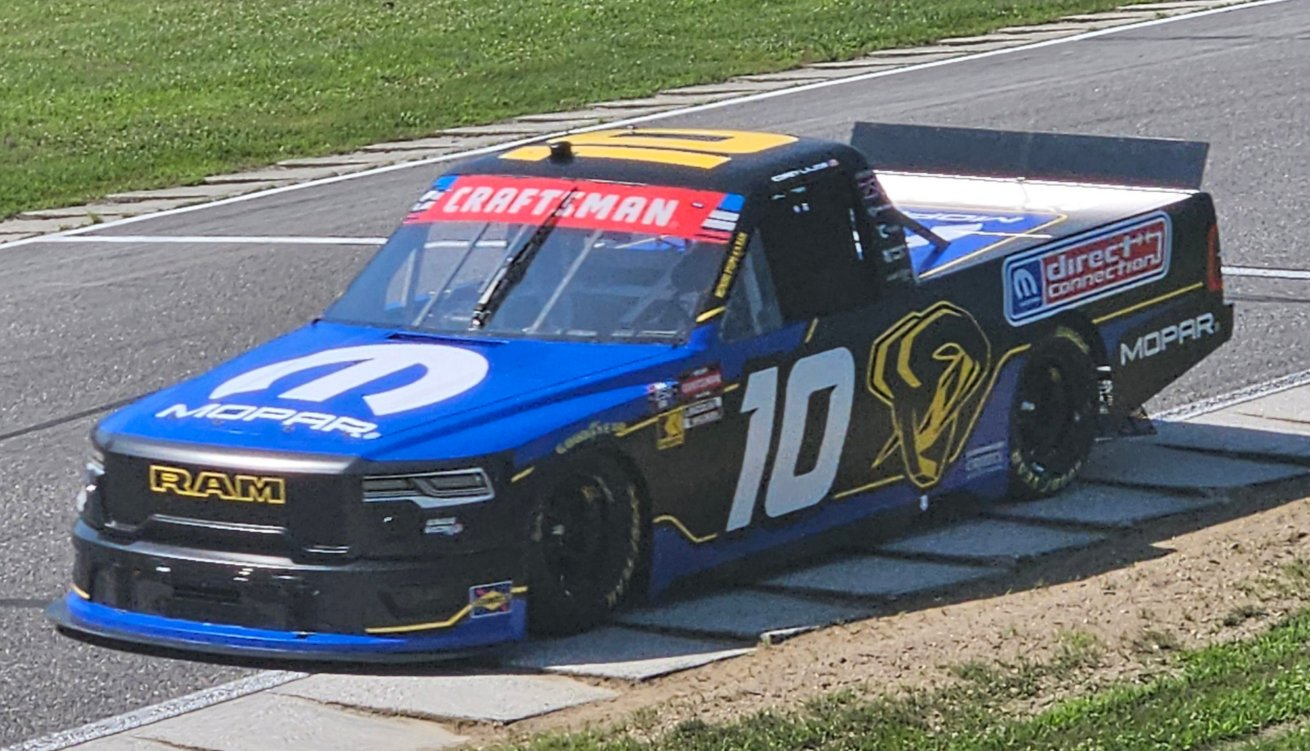
Corey LaJoie in the No. 10 at Lime Rock Park in 2026

The No. 10 truck was announced as an official show car for the program. On December 4, 2025, Kaulig officially confirmed Dye was set to drive the No. 10. On March 17, 2026, Dye was indefinitely suspended by NASCAR and Kaulig for mocking IndyCar Series driver David Malukas, insinuating he is homosexual on a Whatnot stream. A. J. Allmendinger drove the 10 truck at Darlington. On March 31, it was announced that Dye was released from the team and Corey LaJoie would drive the 10 truck for the rest of the season.

==== Truck No. 10 results ====
Year	Driver	No.	Make	1	2	3	4	5	6	7	8	9	10	11	12	13	14	15	16	17	18	19	20	21	22	23	24	25	Owners	pts
2026	Daniel Dye	10	Ram	DAY; 17	ATL; 13	STP; 17																							23rd	453
2026	A. J. Allmendinger	10	Ram				DAR; 11																						23rd	453
2026	Corey LaJoie	10	Ram					ROC; 7	BRI; 29	TEX; 25	GLN; 12	DOV; 8	CLT; 12	NSH; 22	MCH; 29	COR; 35	LRP; 28	NWS; 29	IRP; 24	RCH; 21	NHA; 15	BRI; 18	KAN; 10	CLT; 16	PHO; 17	TAL; 33	MAR; 20	HOM; 10	23rd	453

=== Truck No. 12 history ===
Brenden Queen (2026)

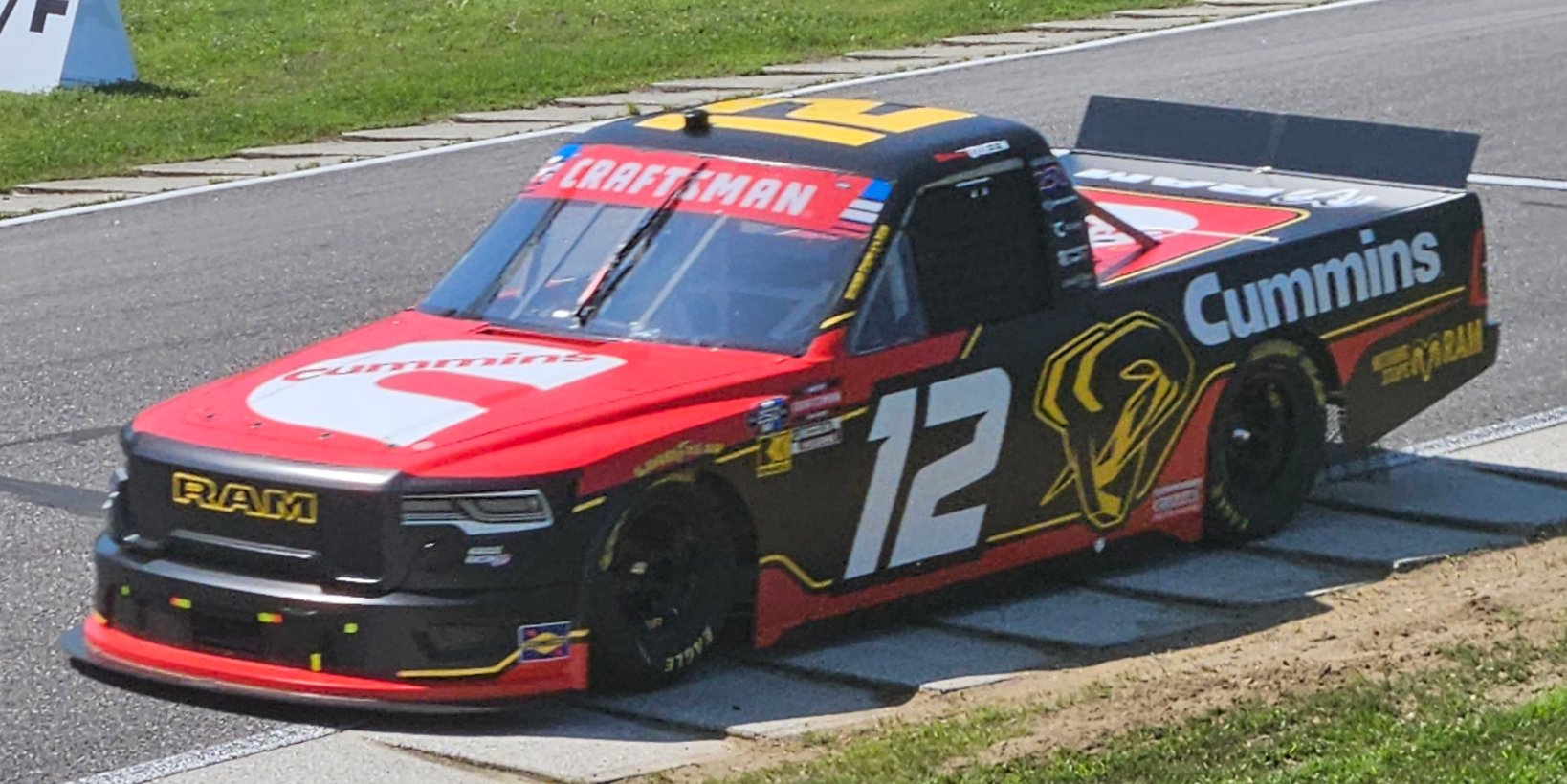
Brenden Queen in the No. 12 at Lime Rock Park in 2026

On October 16, 2025, Kaulig Racing announced that 2025 ARCA Menards Series champion Brenden Queen will drive for the team for the 2026 season. On December 4, 2025, Kaulig officially confirmed Queen was set to drive the No. 12.

==== Truck No. 12 results ====
Year	Driver	No.	Make	1	2	3	4	5	6	7	8	9	10	11	12	13	14	15	16	17	18	19	20	21	22	23	24	25	Owners	pts
2026	Brenden Queen	12	Ram	DAY; 7	ATL; 16	STP; 24	DAR; 20	ROC; 27	BRI; 10	TEX; 13	GLN; 9	DOV; 13	CLT; 32	NSH; 19	MCH; 14	COR; 7	LRP; 12	NWS; 21	IRP; 20	RCH; 20	NHA; 20	BRI; 21	KAN; 14	CLT; 13	PHO; 23	TAL; 7	MAR; 12	HOM; 20	19th	514

=== Truck No. 14 history ===
Mini Tyrrell (2026)

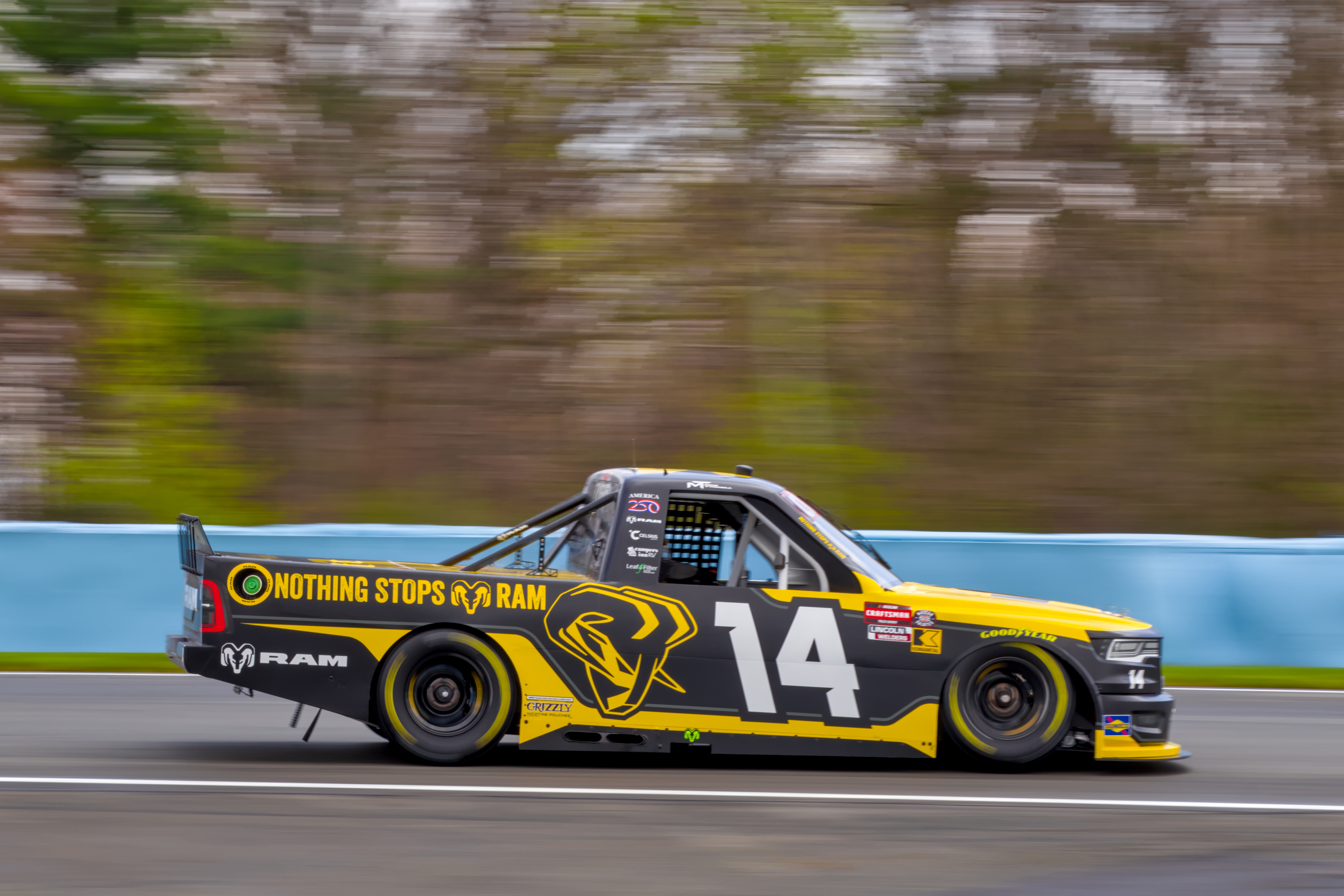
Mini Tyrrell in the No. 14 at Watkins Glen International in 2026

On December 4, 2025, Kaulig Racing announced their truck numbers.

On January 9, 2026, Kaulig announced the competition "Race For The Seat" in partnership with Dana White's Thrill Sports Productions, to be aired on Fox. The competition pitted 15 young drivers against each other for a chance to drive the team's No. 14 truck full-time during the 2026 season. Mini Tyrrell would ultimately win the competition and earn the full-time ride.

==== Truck No. 14 results ====
Year	Driver	No.	Make	1	2	3	4	5	6	7	8	9	10	11	12	13	14	15	16	17	18	19	20	21	22	23	24	25	Owners	pts
2026	Mini Tyrrell	14	Ram	DAY; 19	ATL; 19	STP; 28	DAR; 34	ROC; 25	BRI; 19	TEX; 21	GLN; 8	DOV; 27	CLT; 34	NSH; 20	MCH; 20	COR; 11	LRP; 24	NWS; 28	IRP; 27	RCH; 29	NHA; 23	BRI; 21	KAN; 18	CLT; 15	PHO; 29	TAL; 28	MAR; 17	HOM	28th	359

=== Truck No. 16 history ===
Justin Haley (2026)

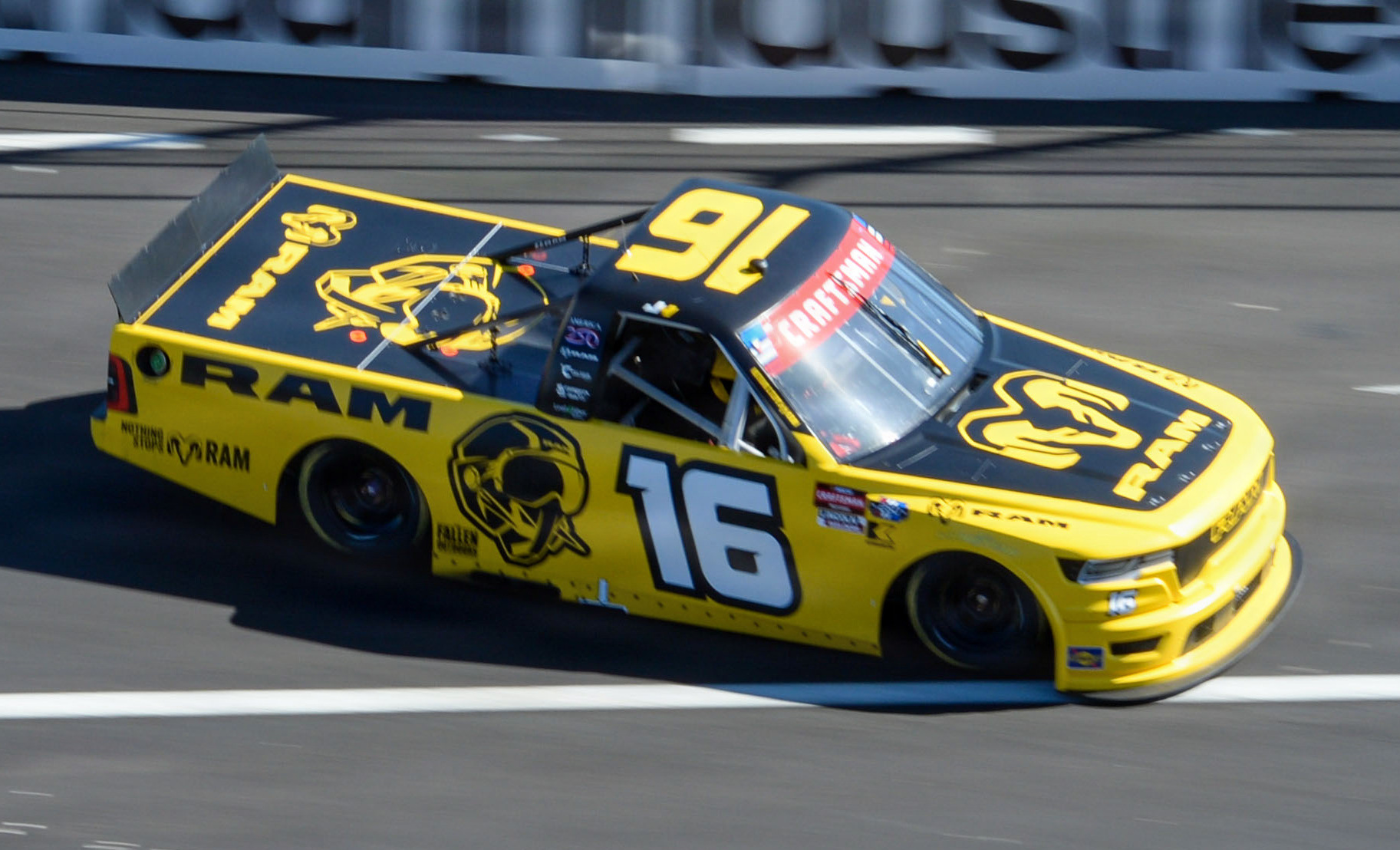
Justin Haley in the No. 16 at Naval Base Coronado in 2026

On October 29, 2025, Kaulig Racing announced Justin Haley, along with Daniel Dye, as the next pair of drivers to their roster. On December 4, 2025, Kaulig officially confirmed Haley was set to drive the No. 16.

==== Truck No. 16 results ====
Year	Driver	No.	Make	1	2	3	4	5	6	7	8	9	10	11	12	13	14	15	16	17	18	19	20	21	22	23	24	25	Owners	pts
2026	Justin Haley	16	Ram	DAY; 22*	ATL; 10	STP; 12	DAR; 15	ROC; 12	BRI; 15	TEX; 27	GLN; 23	DOV; 10	CLT; 17	NSH; 31	MCH; 28	COR; 6	LRP; 14	NWS; 26	IRP; 18	RCH; 27	NHA; 9	BRI; 4	KAN; 11	CLT; 10	PHO; 20	TAL; 20	MAR; 34	HOM	21st	496

=== Truck No. 25 history ===
Free Agent Program (2026)

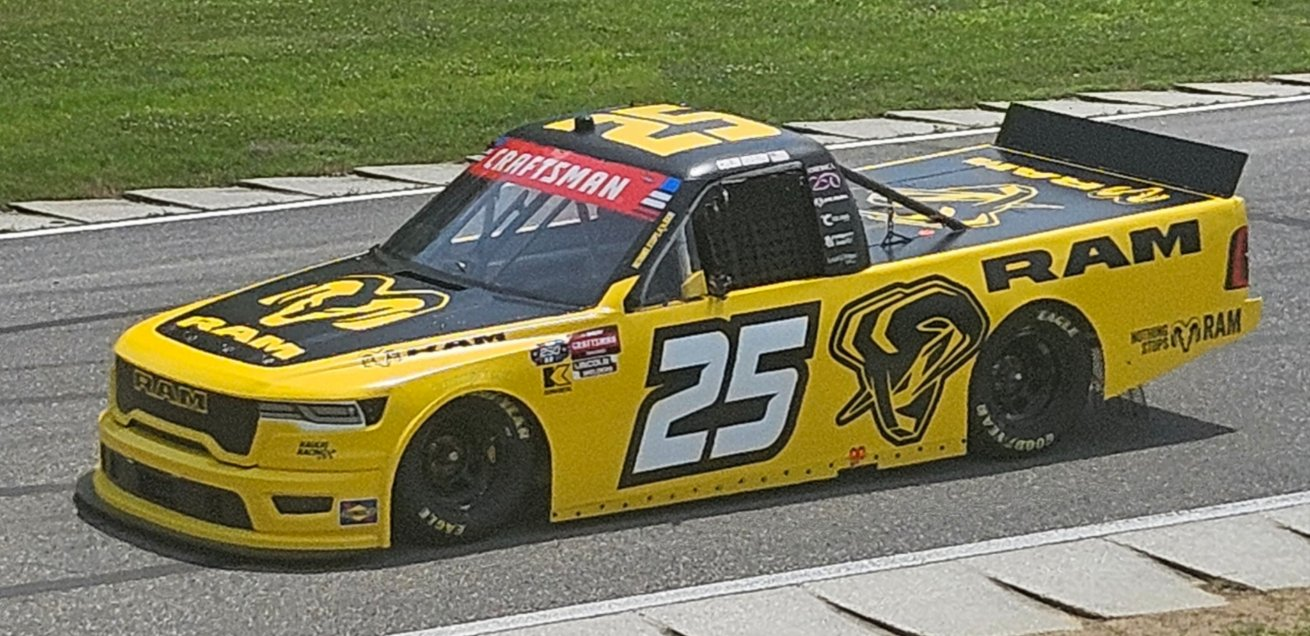
Colin Braun in the No. 25 at Lime Rock Park in 2026

On November 17, 2025, Ram Trucks announced a "Free Agent Program" for the No. 25 truck for the 2026 season. While the drivers will not be competing for the championship, they will be eligible to win a prize from Ram Trucks at the end of the season, based on their individual track performance. Kaulig Racing announced that Tony Stewart will drive the truck at Daytona and Talladega. On February 13, 2026, Kaulig announced that Ty Dillon would run the No. 25 at Atlanta and Rockingham. Colin Braun would drive the No. 25 at St. Petersburg, Lime Rock and New Hampshire. Corey LaJoie would drive the No. 25 at Darlington. Runner-up of "RAM: Race For The Seat" Carson Ferguson would drive the No. 25 at Bristol, Martinsville, and Nashville. Parker Kligerman would drive the No. 25 at Texas, Michigan, and Homestead Miami. Clint Bowyer would run the No. 25 at Dover while Jamie McMurray would run the No. 25 at San Diego. A. J. Allmendinger would run the No. 25 at Watkins Glen. Travis Pastrana will run the No. 25 at Charlotte. Conor Daly would run the No. 25 at Indianapolis Raceway Park, Kansas, and Phoenix. Ryan Newman would run the No. 25 at North Wilkesboro. On July 18, it was announced that Elliott Sadler would drive the No. 25 at Richmond. Regan Smith would drive the No. 25 at Bristol night race and fall Charlotte race.

==== Truck No. 25 results ====
Year	Driver	No.	Make	1	2	3	4	5	6	7	8	9	10	11	12	13	14	15	16	17	18	19	20	21	22	23	24	25	Owners	pts
2026	Tony Stewart	25	Ram	DAY; 36																						TAL; 34			25th	380
2026	Ty Dillon	25	Ram		ATL; 11			ROC; 22																					25th	380
2026	Colin Braun	25	Ram			STP; 9											LRP; 10				NHA; 23								25th	380
2026	Corey LaJoie	25	Ram				DAR; 21																						25th	380
2026	Carson Ferguson	25	Ram						BRI; 21					NSH; 35													MAR; 29		25th	380
2026	Parker Kligerman	25	Ram							TEX; 11					MCH; 16													HOM; 15	25th	380
2026	A. J. Allmendinger	25	Ram								GLN; 6																		25th	380
2026	Clint Bowyer	25	Ram									DOV; 29																	25th	380
2026	Travis Pastrana	25	Ram										CLT; 22																25th	380
2026	Jamie McMurray	25	Ram													COR; 34													25th	380
2026	Ryan Newman	25	Ram															NWS; 24											25th	380
2026	Conor Daly	25	Ram																IRP; 26				KAN; 16		PHO; 30				25th	380
2026	Elliott Sadler	25	Ram																	RCH; 32									25th	380
2026	Regan Smith	25	Ram																			BRI; 23		CLT; 17					25th	380
