= DGM Racing =

Auto race team

- Owner: Mario Gosselin
- Base: Lake Wales, Florida
- Series: NASCAR O'Reilly Auto Parts Series
- Race drivers: 91. Mason Maggio, Ross Chastain, Alex Labbé, Myatt Snider, Austin Green, Dexter Bean; 92. Josh Williams
- Manufacturer: Chevrolet
- Opened: 2002

Career
- Latest race: O'Reilly Auto Parts Series: 2026 O'Reilly Auto Parts 300 (Homestead); Camping World Truck Series: 2014 Kroger 250 (Martinsville); ARCA Racing Series: 2018 Kansas 150 (Kansas)
- Races competed: Total: 541; O'Reilly Auto Parts Series: 422; Camping World Truck Series: 54; ARCA Racing Series: 65
- Drivers' Championships: Total: 0 O'Reilly Auto Parts Series: 0 Camping World Truck Series: 0 ARCA Racing Series: 0
- Race victories: Total: 2 O'Reilly Auto Parts Series: 0 Camping World Truck Series: 0 ARCA Racing Series: 2
- Pole positions: Total: 0 O'Reilly Auto Parts Series: 0 Camping World Truck Series: 0 ARCA Racing Series: 0

DGM Racing (formerly King Autosport) is a Canadian professional stock car racing team that currently competes in the NASCAR O'Reilly Auto Parts Series. The team is owned by Mario Gosselin. The team is now located in Lake Wales, Florida. The team formerly fielded a Truck Series team and an ARCA team. Gosselin won two ARCA races with the team. The team currently fields three Chevrolet Camaro SS: the No. 91 full-time primarily for Mason Maggio, and the No. 92 full–time primarily for Josh Williams.

== O'Reilly Auto Parts Series ==
=== Car No. 36 history ===
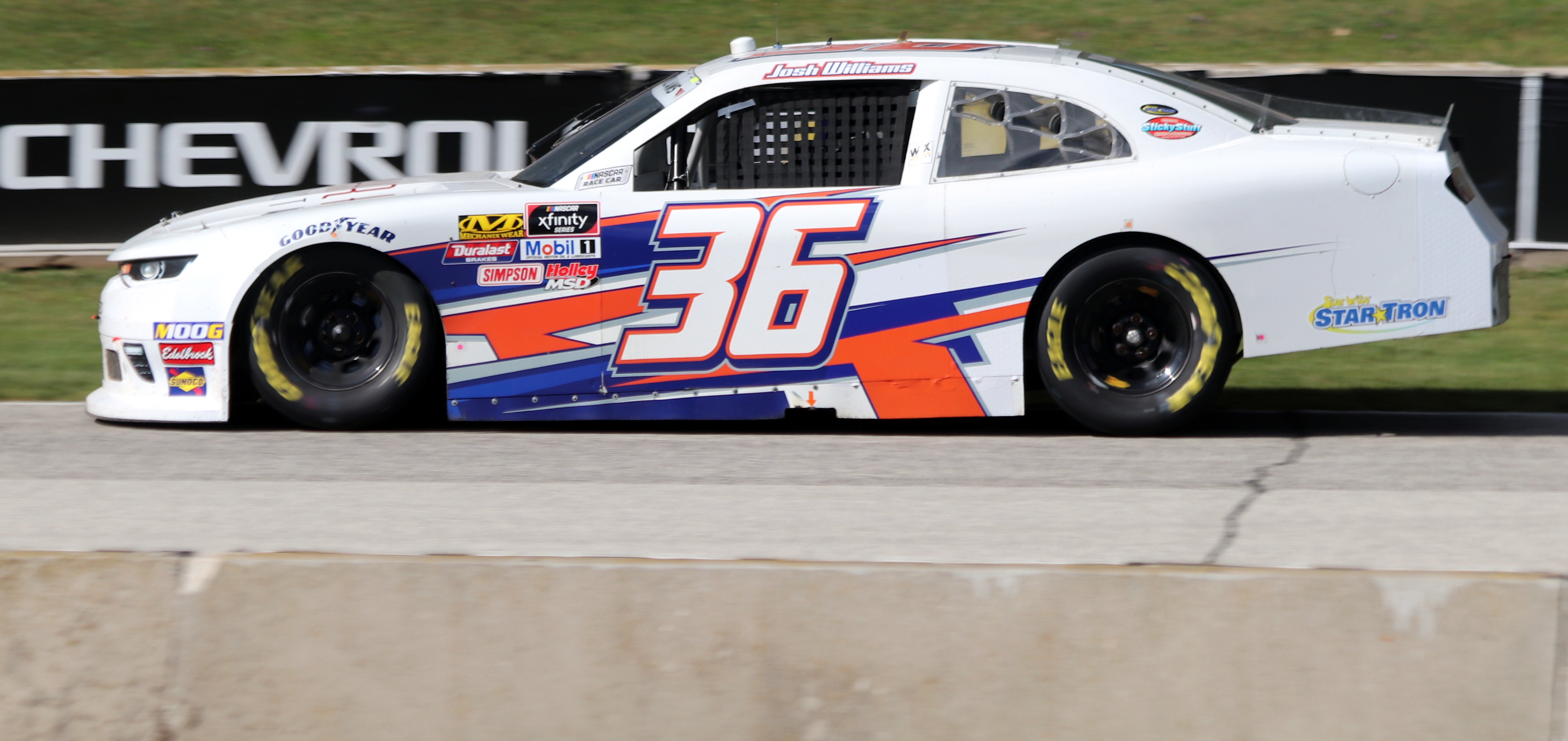
No. 36 in 2019 driven by Josh Williams

In 2018, it was announced that Alex Labbé would compete full-time in 2018 in the No. 36 Chevrolet with sponsorship from Can-Am.

In 2019 it was announced that Josh Williams would drive the No. 36 full-time. In May 2019 Williams got his best career finish, finishing eighth at Talladega. Donald Theetge drove the No. 36 car for one race at Richmond while Williams drove the No. 92 car.

In 2020, Labbé returned to the No. 36 for 21 races with some part-time drivers such as Ronnie Bassett Jr., Dexter Bean, Preston Pardus, and Korbin Forrister.

In 2021, Labbé returned to full season in the No. 36 car. He finished nineteenth in points with three top-tens.

In 2022, Josh Bilicki drove the 36 car at Daytona while Labbé would drive for the rest of the season. Garrett Smithley would drive the 36 car at Charlotte.

In 2023, the car returned to being part-time. It was announced on February 9, 2023 that Alex Labbé would race it at Daytona. However, he would fail to qualify. Josh Bilicki would race the car at Sonoma and at the Indianapolis Road Course, finishing nineteenth and eighteenth, respectively. Alex Guenette would run at the Chicago Street Course, and Kyle Weatherman would run at Atlanta.

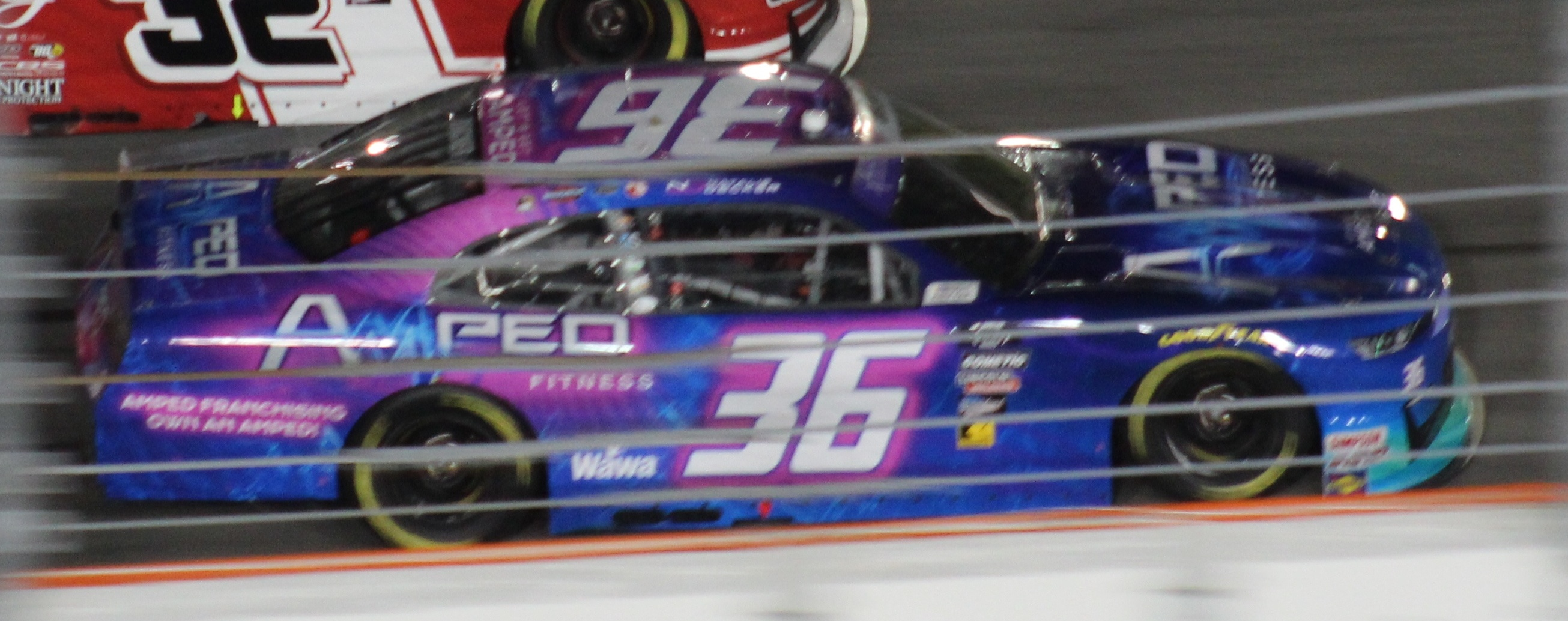
No. 36 in 2024 driven by Natalie Decker.

On February 8, 2024, it was announced that Natalie Decker would run at Daytona in the 2024 United Rentals 300. She would lead seven laps and ended up with an eighteenth place finish. Preston Pardus drove the No. 36 at Portland in the 2024 Pacific Office Automation 147. Daniel Suárez drove the No. 36 at the Chicago street race.

==== Car No. 36 results ====
| Year | Driver | No. | Make | 1 | 2 | 3 | 4 | 5 | 6 | 7 | 8 | 9 | 10 | 11 | 12 | 13 | 14 | 15 | 16 | 17 | 18 | 19 | 20 | 21 | 22 | 23 | 24 | 25 | 26 | 27 | 28 | 29 | 30 | 31 | 32 | 33 | Owners | Pts |
|---|---|---|---|---|---|---|---|---|---|---|---|---|---|---|---|---|---|---|---|---|---|---|---|---|---|---|---|---|---|---|---|---|---|---|---|---|---|---|
| 2018 | Alex Labbé | 36 | Chevy | DAY; 24 | ATL; 18 | LVS; 17 | PHO; 22 | CAL; 19 | TEX; 32 | BRI; 11 | RCH; 16 | TAL; 24 | DOV; 21 | CLT; 34 | POC; 18 | MCH; 37 | IOW; 23 | CHI; 21 | DAY; 15 | KEN; 32 | NHA; 23 | IOW; 16 | GLN; 19 | MOH; 9 | BRI; 23 | ROA; 16 | DAR; 19 | IND; 19 | LVS; 16 | RCH; 21 | ROV; 13 | DOV; 21 | KAN; 12 | TEX; 30 | PHO; 20 | HOM; 21 | 20th | 540 |
| 2019 | Josh Williams | 36 | Chevy | DAY; 22 | ATL; 21 | LVS; 16 | PHO; 29 | CAL; 33 | TEX; 14 | BRI; 19 | | TAL; 8 | DOV; 22 | CLT; 27 | POC; 15 | MCH; 23 | IOW; 17 | CHI; 26 | DAY; 28 | KEN; 18 | NHA; 19 | IOW; 15 | GLN; 19 | MOH; 22 | BRI; 30 | ROA; 31 | DAR; 24 | IND; 17 | LVS; 18 | RCH; 23 | ROV; 20 | DOV; 15 | KAN; 21 | TEX; 14 | PHO; 15 | HOM; 19 | 20th | 539 |
| 2019 | Donald Theetge | 36 | Chevy | | | | | | | | RCH; 25 | | | | | | | | | | | | | | | | | | | | | | | | | | 20th | 539 |
| 2020 | Alex Labbé | 36 | Chevy | DAY; 10 | LVS | CAL | PHO; 22 | | CLT; 16 | BRI; 33 | | HOM; 25 | HOM; 23 | TAL; 9 | | | KEN; 24 | KEN; 24 | | | | | | | DAY; 30 | DAR; 16 | RCH; 23 | RCH; 12 | BRI; 13 | LVS; 32 | TAL; 10 | ROV; 4 | KAN; 23 | TEX; 11 | MAR; 27 | PHO; 21 | 19th | 569 |
| 2020 | Ronnie Bassett Jr. | 36 | Chevy | | | | | DAR; 31 | | | ATL; 19 | | | | | | | | | | | | | | | | | | | | | | | | | | 19th | 569 |
| 2020 | Dexter Bean | 36 | Chevy | | | | | | | | | | | | POC; 11 | | | | TEX; 33 | KAN; 35 | | | | | | | | | | | | | | | | | 19th | 569 |
| 2020 | Preston Pardus | 36 | Chevy | | | | | | | | | | | | | IRC; 10 | | | | | ROA; 8 | DAY; 31 | | | | | | | | | | | | | | | 19th | 569 |
| 2020 | Korbin Forrister | 36 | Chevy | | | | | | | | | | | | | | | | | | | | DOV; 32 | DOV; 32 | | | | | | | | | | | | | 19th | 569 |
| 2021 | Alex Labbé | 36 | Chevy | DAY; 40 | DAY; 22 | HOM; 15 | LVS; 35 | PHO; 32 | ATL; 17 | MAR; 31 | TAL; 21 | DAR; 10 | DOV; 19 | COA; 20 | CLT; 14 | MOH; 11 | TEX; 18 | NSH; 17 | POC; 16 | ROA; 21 | ATL; 15 | NHA; 36 | GLN; 39 | IRC; 13 | MCH; 31 | DAY; 31 | DAR; 10 | RCH; 19 | BRI; 19 | LVS; 38 | TAL; 21 | ROV; 14 | TEX; 24 | KAN; 33 | MAR; 8 | PHO; 30 | 21st | 502 |
| 2022 | Josh Bilicki | 36 | Chevy | DAY; 9 | | | | | | | | | | | | | | | | | | | | | | | | | | | | | | | | | 22nd | 551 |
| 2022 | Alex Labbé | 36 | Chevy | | CAL; 24 | LVS; 15 | PHO; 19 | ATL; 19 | COA; 36 | RCH; 19 | MAR; 15 | TAL; 12 | DOV; 19 | DAR; 19 | TEX; 33 | | PIR; 10 | NSH; 23 | ROA; 15 | ATL; 23 | NHA; 27 | POC; 37 | IRC; 12 | MCH; 26 | GLN; 35 | DAY; 8 | | | BRI; 26 | | | ROV; 6 | | | MAR; 13 | | 22nd | 551 |
| 2022 | Garrett Smithley | 36 | Chevy | | | | | | | | | | | | | CLT; 21 | | | | | | | | | | | | | | | | | | | | | 22nd | 551 |
| 2022 | Josh Williams | 36 | Chevy | | | | | | | | | | | | | | | | | | | | | | | | DAR; 26 | KAN; 24 | | TEX; 26 | TAL; 19 | | LVS; 34 | HOM; 30 | | PHO; 15 | 22nd | 551 |
| 2023 | Alex Labbé | 36 | Chevy | DAY; DNQ | CAL | LVS | PHO | ATL | COA | RCH | MAR | TAL | DOV | DAR | CLT | PIR | | | | | | | | | | | | | | | | | | | | | 43rd | 65 |
| 2023 | Josh Bilicki | 36 | Chevy | | | | | | | | | | | | | | SON; 19 | NSH | | | | | | | IRC; 18 | GLN | DAY | DAR | KAN | BRI | TEX | ROV | LVS | HOM | MAR | PHO | 43rd | 65 |
| 2023 | Alex Guenette | 36 | Chevy | | | | | | | | | | | | | | | | CSC; 15 | | | | | | | | | | | | | | | | | | 43rd | 65 |
| 2023 | Kyle Weatherman | 36 | Chevy | | | | | | | | | | | | | | | | | ATL; 31 | NHA | POC | ROA | MCH | | | | | | | | | | | | | 43rd | 65 |
| 2024 | Natalie Decker | 36 | Chevy | DAY; 18 | ATL | LVS | PHO | COA | RCH | MAR | TEX | TAL; Wth | DOV | DAR | CLT | | | | | | | | | | | | | | | | | | | | | | 48th | 31 |
| 2024 | Preston Pardus | 36 | Chevy | | | | | | | | | | | | | PIR; 38 | SON | IOW | NHA | NSH | | | | | | | | | | | | | | | | | 48th | 31 |
| 2024 | Daniel Suárez | 36 | Chevy | | | | | | | | | | | | | | | | | | CSC; 27 | POC | IND | MCH | DAY | DAR | ATL | | | | | | | | | | 48th | 31 |
| 2024 | Kyle Weatherman | 36 | Chevy | | | | | | | | | | | | | | | | | | | | | | | | | GLN; 38 | BRI | KAN | TAL | ROV | LVS | HOM | MAR | PHO | 48th | 31 |

=== Car No. 71 history ===
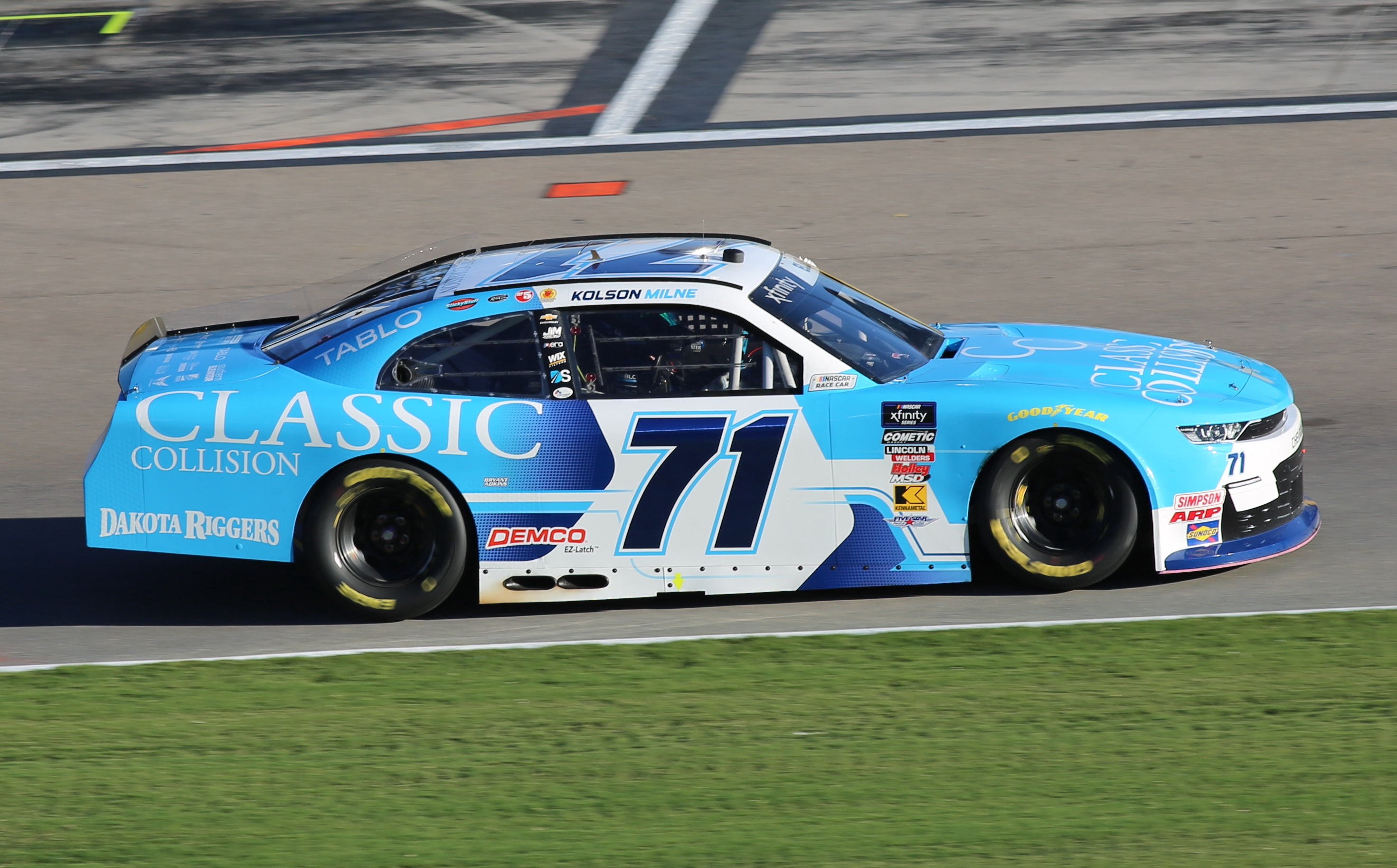
Ryan Ellis in the No. 71 car at Las Vegas in 2025

On December 6, 2024, it was announced that DGM would field the No. 71 in 2025, with newly signed Ryan Ellis competing for the team. Sweetwater Construction will serve as a primary sponsor.

In 2026, DGM would field the No. 71 for Leland Honeyman at Sonoma, summer Daytona race, and fall Talladega race.

==== Car No. 71 results ====
| Year | Driver | No. | Make | 1 | 2 | 3 | 4 | 5 | 6 | 7 | 8 | 9 | 10 | 11 | 12 | 13 | 14 | 15 | 16 | 17 | 18 | 19 | 20 | 21 | 22 | 23 | 24 | 25 | 26 | 27 | 28 | 29 | 30 | 31 | 32 | 33 | Owners | Pts |
|---|---|---|---|---|---|---|---|---|---|---|---|---|---|---|---|---|---|---|---|---|---|---|---|---|---|---|---|---|---|---|---|---|---|---|---|---|---|---|
| 2025 | Ryan Ellis | 71 | Chevy | DAY; 23 | ATL; 18 | COA; 16 | PHO; 33 | LVS; 34 | HOM; 20 | MAR; 18 | DAR; 22 | BRI; 27 | CAR; 33 | TAL; 16 | TEX; 23 | CLT; 8 | NSH; 36 | MXC; 32 | POC; 32 | ATL; 21 | CSC; 25 | SON; 27 | DOV; 30 | IND; 21 | IOW; 25 | GLN; 29 | DAY; 11 | PIR; 21 | GTW; 18 | BRI; 38 | KAN; 26 | ROV; 24 | LVS; 29 | TAL; 27 | MAR; 22 | PHO; 21 | 29th | 419 |
| 2026 | Leland Honeyman | 71 | Chevy | DAY | ATL | COA | PHO | LVS | DAR | MAR | CAR | BRI | KAN | TAL | TEX | GLN | DOV | CLT | NSH | POC | COR | SON; 35 | CHI | ATL | IND | IOW | DAY; 13 | DAR | GTW | BRI | LVS | CLT | PHO | TAL; 36 | MAR | HOM | 45th | 28 |

=== Car No. 90 history ===
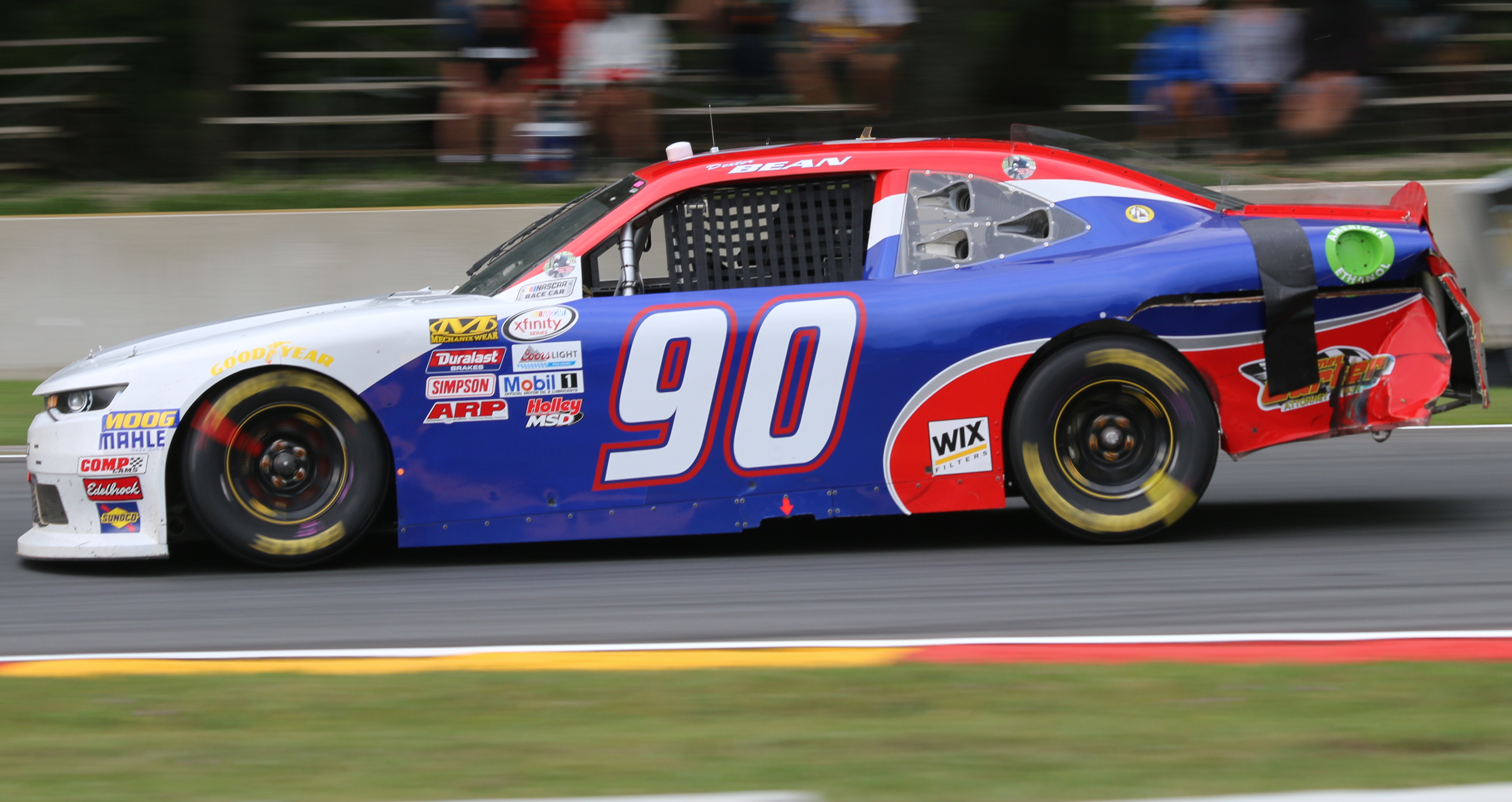
Dexter Bean in the No. 90 at Road America in 2017

In 2013, the team attempted Bristol summer race with Martin Roy but he failed to qualify.

In 2014, the team finally debuted NASCAR Xfinity Series with Martin Roy in six races, he make the field in five and only failed to qualify at Homestead.

In 2015, the team returned with Mario Gosselin and Martin Roy in a full-time schedule. Martin Roy was in the No. 92 for some races. The No. 90 team itself ran a full schedule but only 18 races with DGM Racing and the ride was split with SS-Green Light Racing.

In 2016, the No. 90 returned to the NASCAR Xfinity Series once again and is now almost full-time except for two races, one fielded once again by SS-Green Light Racing and the other one fielded by B. J. McLeod Motorsports.

In 2017, the team returned full-time again but now only for 21 races with King, and the ride was split with Brandonbilt Motorsports that fielded the car in the other twelve.

In 2018, the team split the ride with Brandonbilt again. This time Brandonbilt only fielded the car for seven races while DGM fielded for 26 races.

In 2019, DGM fielded the No. 90 full-time by themselves. Caesar Bacarella drove for the team for 3 races. At the 2019 U.S. Cellular 250, Dillon Bassett collided with a sweeper while attempting to enter pit road during one of the caution laps. At the 2019 Drive for the Cure 250 Alex Labbé would get the best finish in team history, finishing in sixth place.

In 2020, Bacarella, Bassett, Alex Labbé, Ronnie Bassett Jr., Dexter Bean, Preston Pardus, B. J. McLeod and Donald Theetge split time in the split time in the No. 90. The No. 90 car earned one top 10 finish, with Labbé finishing in 8th at the 2020 Pennzoil 150.

In 2021, Bacarella, Bean, Pardus, George Gorham Jr., McLeod, Kyle Sieg, Bassett Jr., Loris Hezemans and Spencer Boyd ran the No. 90. The highlight of the year was when Pardus qualified 37th in the Drive for the Cure 250 and finished seventh, the only top-ten of the year in the No. 90.

In 2022, Labbé ran the No. 90 in the 2022 Beef. It's What's for Dinner. 300 before switching over to the No. 36. The No. 90 would return to IRC with Mason Filippi. They failed to qualify in both attempts.

==== Car No. 90 results ====
| Year | Driver | No. | Make | 1 | 2 | 3 | 4 | 5 | 6 | 7 | 8 | 9 | 10 | 11 | 12 | 13 | 14 | 15 | 16 | 17 | 18 | 19 | 20 | 21 | 22 | 23 | 24 | 25 | 26 | 27 | 28 | 29 | 30 | 31 | 32 | 33 | Owners | Pts |
|---|---|---|---|---|---|---|---|---|---|---|---|---|---|---|---|---|---|---|---|---|---|---|---|---|---|---|---|---|---|---|---|---|---|---|---|---|---|---|
| 2013 | Martin Roy | 90 | Chevy | DAY | PHO | LVS | BRI | CAL | TEX | RCH | TAL | DAR | CLT | DOV | IOW | MCH | ROA | KEN | DAY | NHA | CHI | IND | IOW | GLN | MOH | BRI; DNQ | ATL | RCH | CHI | KEN | DOV | KAN | CLT | TEX | PHO | HOM | 68th | 0 |
| 2014 | Martin Roy | 90 | Chevy | DAY | PHO; 30 | LVS | BRI | CAL | TEX | DAR | RCH | TAL | IOW | CLT | DOV | MCH | ROA | KEN; 31 | DAY | NHA | CHI | IND | IOW | GLN | MOH | BRI | ATL | RCH | CHI; 38 | KEN | DOV | KAN; 33 | CLT | TEX; 35 | PHO | HOM; DNQ | 50th | 53 |
| 2015 | Mario Gosselin | 90 | Chevy | DAY; 15 | | LVS; 32 | PHO; 38 | CAL; 27 | TEX; 28 | | | TAL; 19 | | | DOV; 32 | | | | | | | | | | BRI; 35 | | | | | | DOV; 19 | | | | PHO; 28 | HOM; 34 | 28th | 552 |
| 2015 | Jimmy Weller III | 90 | Chevy | | ATL; 33 | | | | | | RCH; 33 | | | CLT; 26 | | | | | | | | | | | | | | | | | | CLT; 30 | | | | | 28th | 552 |
| 2015 | Todd Bodine | 90 | Chevy | | | | | | | BRI; 24 | | | IOW; 24 | | | | | | | | | | GLN; 19 | | | | DAR; 29 | | | | | | | | | | 28th | 552 |
| 2015 | Martin Roy | 90 | Chevy | | | | | | | | | | | | | MCH; 28 | CHI; 30 | DAY; 21 | | | IND; 24 | | | | | | | | CHI; 29 | KEN; 22 | | | | TEX; 29 | | | 28th | 552 |
| 2015 | Tyler Young | 90 | Chevy | | | | | | | | | | | | | | | | KEN; 28 | | | | | | | | | | | | | | | | | | 28th | 552 |
| 2015 | B. J. McLeod | 90 | Chevy | | | | | | | | | | | | | | | | | NHA; 24 | | | | | | | | | | | | | | | | | 28th | 552 |
| 2015 | Andy Lally | 90 | Chevy | | | | | | | | | | | | | | | | | | | | | MOH; 21 | | ROA; 15 | | | | | | | | | | | 28th | 552 |
| 2015 | Korbin Forrister | 90 | Chevy | | | | | | | | | | | | | | | | | | | | | | | | | | | | | | KAN; 31 | | | | 28th | 552 |
| 2016 | Martin Roy | 90 | Chevy | DAY; 38 | | | | | TEX; 25 | | | | | CLT; 26 | | MCH; 27 | | | | | | | | | | | | | CHI; 22 | | | CLT; 31 | KAN; 26 | TEX; 30 | | | 25th | 477 |
| 2016 | Mario Gosselin | 90 | Chevy | | ATL; 25 | LVS; 29 | PHO; 35 | CAL; 26 | | BRI; 24 | | TAL; 28 | DOV; 28 | | POC; 20 | | IOW; 24 | DAY; 33 | | NHA; 24 | IND; 29 | IOW; 25 | | | BRI; 17 | | DAR; 26 | RCH; 33 | | | DOV; 23 | | | | | HOM; 38 | 25th | 477 |
| 2016 | Todd Peck | 90 | Ford | | | | | | | | RCH; 32 | | | | | | | | | | | | | | | | | | | | | | | | | | 25th | 477 |
| 2016 | Alex Guenette | 90 | Chevy | | | | | | | | | | | | | | | | KEN; 26 | | | | | | | | | | | | | | | | | | 25th | 477 |
| 2016 | Todd Bodine | 90 | Chevy | | | | | | | | | | | | | | | | | | | | GLN; 34 | | | | | | | | | | | | | | 25th | 477 |
| 2016 | Andy Lally | 90 | Chevy | | | | | | | | | | | | | | | | | | | | | MOH; 7 | | | | | | | | | | | | | 25th | 477 |
| 2016 | James Davison | 90 | Chevy | | | | | | | | | | | | | | | | | | | | | | | ROA; 19 | | | | | | | | | | | 25th | 477 |
| 2016 | Dexter Bean | 90 | Chevy | | | | | | | | | | | | | | | | | | | | | | | | | | | KEN; 23 | | | | | | | 25th | 477 |
| 2016 | Alex Labbé | 90 | Chevy | | | | | | | | | | | | | | | | | | | | | | | | | | | | | | | | PHO; 23 | | 25th | 477 |
| 2017 | Mario Gosselin | 90 | Chevy | DAY; 17 | | | PHO; 28 | | | | | | | | | | | | | | IND; 27 | | | | | | | | CHI; 31 | | | CLT; 24 | KAN; 29 | TEX; 28 | PHO; 26 | | 34th | 303 |
| 2017 | Brandon Brown | 90 | Chevy | | ATL; 23 | | | | | | RCH; 25 | | | DOV; 17 | | MCH; 33 | | DAY; 37 | KEN; DNQ | | | IOW; 29 | | | BRI; 25 | | DAR; 20 | RCH; 27 | | | DOV; 25 | | | | | | 34th | 303 |
| 2017 | Martin Roy | 90 | Chevy | | | LVS; 32 | | CAL; 25 | | | | TAL; 32 | | | | | | | | NHA; 33 | | | | | | | | | | | | | | | | | 34th | 303 |
| 2017 | Alex Labbé | 90 | Chevy | | | | | | TEX; 28 | | | | CLT; 33 | | | | | | | | | | | | | | | | | | | | | | | | 34th | 303 |
| 2017 | Josh Williams | 90 | Chevy | | | | | | | BRI; 22 | | | | | POC; 28 | | | | | | | | | | | | | | | KEN; 26 | | | | | | HOM; 28 | 34th | 303 |
| 2017 | Dexter Bean | 90 | Chevy | | | | | | | | | | | | | | IOW; 33 | | | | | | | | | ROA; 26 | | | | | | | | | | | 34th | 303 |
| 2017 | Brian Henderson | 90 | Chevy | | | | | | | | | | | | | | | | | | | | GLN; 33 | | | | | | | | | | | | | | 34th | 303 |
| 2017 | Matt Bell | 90 | Chevy | | | | | | | | | | | | | | | | | | | | | MOH; 38 | | | | | | | | | | | | | 34th | 303 |
| 2018 | Josh Williams | 90 | Chevy | DAY; 22 | ATL; 24 | LVS; 21 | PHO; 29 | CAL; 25 | TEX; 30 | BRI; 22 | | TAL; 26 | | CLT; 38 | POC; 21 | MCH; 32 | IOW; 34 | CHI; 31 | DAY; 24 | KEN; 35 | | IOW; 24 | | | BRI; 28 | | | IND; 24 | LVS; 20 | | | | KAN; 24 | | | | 24th | 401 |
| 2018 | Brandon Brown | 90 | Chevy | | | | | | | | RCH; 19 | | DOV; 28 | | | | | | | | | | | | | | DAR; 18 | | | | | DOV; 22 | | TEX; 18 | | | 24th | 401 |
| 2018 | Donald Theetge | 90 | Chevy | | | | | | | | | | | | | | | | | | NHA; 33 | | | | | | | | | | | | | | PHO; 25 | | 24th | 401 |
| 2018 | Brian Henderson | 90 | Chevy | | | | | | | | | | | | | | | | | | | | GLN; 21 | | | | | | | | | | | | | | 24th | 401 |
| 2018 | Andy Lally | 90 | Chevy | | | | | | | | | | | | | | | | | | | | | MOH; 15 | | ROA; 10 | | | | | ROV; 37 | | | | | | 24th | 401 |
| 2018 | Mason Diaz | 90 | Chevy | | | | | | | | | | | | | | | | | | | | | | | | | | | RCH; 19 | | | | | | | 24th | 401 |
| 2018 | Caesar Bacarella | 90 | Chevy | | | | | | | | | | | | | | | | | | | | | | | | | | | | | | | | | HOM; 34 | 24th | 401 |
| 2019 | Caesar Bacarella | 90 | Chevy | DAY; 29 | | | | CAL; 37 | | | | | | | | | | | DAY; 29 | | | | | | | | | | | | | | | | | | 23rd | 421 |
| 2019 | Alex Labbé | 90 | Chevy | | ATL; 19 | | | | | BRI; 31 | | TAL; 25 | | | | | | | | | NHA; 22 | | GLN; 16 | | | | DAR; 17 | | LVS; 17 | | ROV; 6 | | KAN; 15 | | | HOM; 18 | 23rd | 421 |
| 2019 | Donald Theetge | 90 | Chevy | | | LVS; 37 | | | | | | | | | | | | | | | | | | | | | | | | | | | | | | | 23rd | 421 |
| 2019 | Ronnie Bassett Jr. | 90 | Chevy | | | | PHO; 32 | | TEX; 15 | | | | DOV; 25 | | POC; 21 | | IOW; 24 | CHI; 30 | | KEN; 29 | | | | | BRI; 33 | | | IND; 15 | | | | | | TEX; 31 | PHO; 33 | | 23rd | 421 |
| 2019 | Dillon Bassett | 90 | Chevy | | | | | | | | RCH; 15 | | | CLT; DNQ | | MCH; 38 | | | | | | IOW; 26 | | | | | | | | RCH; 13 | | DOV; 14 | | | | | 23rd | 421 |
| 2019 | Chris Dyson | 90 | Chevy | | | | | | | | | | | | | | | | | | | | | MOH; 34 | | | | | | | | | | | | | 23rd | 421 |
| 2019 | Dexter Bean | 90 | Chevy | | | | | | | | | | | | | | | | | | | | | | | ROA; 32 | | | | | | | | | | | 23rd | 421 |
| 2020 | Caesar Bacarella | 90 | Chevy | DAY; 29 | | | | | | | | HOM; 29 | HOM; 30 | TAL; 17 | | | | | | | | | | | DAY; 36 | | | | | | TAL; 13 | | | | | | 32nd | 405 |
| 2020 | Alex Labbé | 90 | Chevy | | LVS; 18 | CAL; 13 | | DAR; 17 | | | ATL; 27 | | | | POC; 17 | IRC; 8 | | | TEX; 31 | KAN; 21 | ROA; 15 | DAY; 27 | DOV; 19 | DOV; 17 | | | | | | | | | | | | | 32nd | 405 |
| 2020 | Dillon Bassett | 90 | Chevy | | | | PHO; 18 | | CLT; 13 | | | | | | | | | | | | | | | | | | | | | | | | | | | | 32nd | 405 |
| 2020 | Ronnie Bassett Jr. | 90 | Chevy | | | | | | | BRI; 31 | | | | | | | KEN; 19 | KEN; 32 | | | | | | | | | | | | | | | | | | | 32nd | 405 |
| 2020 | Dexter Bean | 90 | Chevy | | | | | | | | | | | | | | | | | | | | | | | DAR; 30 | RCH; 31 | RCH; 30 | BRI; 28 | LVS; 29 | | | KAN; 16 | | | | 32nd | 405 |
| 2020 | Preston Pardus | 90 | Chevy | | | | | | | | | | | | | | | | | | | | | | | | | | | | | ROV; 32 | | | | | 32nd | 405 |
| 2020 | B. J. McLeod | 90 | Chevy | | | | | | | | | | | | | | | | | | | | | | | | | | | | | | | TEX; 17 | | | 32nd | 405 |
| 2020 | Donald Theetge | 90 | Chevy | | | | | | | | | | | | | | | | | | | | | | | | | | | | | | | | MAR; 31 | PHO; 36 | 32nd | 405 |
| 2021 | Caesar Bacarella | 90 | Chevy | DAY; 12 | | | | | | | TAL; 38 | | | COA; DNQ | | | | | | | | | | | MCH; 35 | DAY; 36 | | | | | TAL; 32 | | | | | | 38th | 317 |
| 2021 | Preston Pardus | 90 | Chevy | | DAY; 33 | | | | | | | | | | | MOH; 25 | | | | ROA; 16 | | | GLN; 23 | IRC; 35 | | | | | | | | ROV; 7 | | | MAR; 18 | | 38th | 317 |
| 2021 | Dexter Bean | 90 | Chevy | | | HOM; 17 | LVS; 25 | PHO; 29 | ATL; 35 | | | | | | | | | | | | | NHA; 27 | | | | | | | | | | | | | | | 38th | 317 |
| 2021 | George Gorham Jr. | 90 | Chevy | | | | | | | MAR; 18 | | | | | | | | | | | | | | | | | | | | | | | | | | | 38th | 317 |
| 2021 | B. J. McLeod | 90 | Chevy | | | | | | | | | DAR; 26 | | | CLT; DNQ | | | | | | | | | | | | | | | | | | | | | | 38th | 317 |
| 2021 | Kyle Sieg | 90 | Ford | | | | | | | | | | DOV; 34 | | | | | | | | | | | | | | | | | | | | | | | | 38th | 317 |
| 2021 | Ronnie Bassett Jr. | 90 | Chevy | | | | | | | | | | | | | | TEX; 22 | | | | ATL; 27 | | | | | | | | | | | | | | | | 38th | 317 |
| 2021 | Dillon Bassett | 90 | Chevy | | | | | | | | | | | | | | | NSH; DNQ | | | | | | | | | | | | | | | | | | | 38th | 317 |
| 2021 | Loris Hezemans | 90 | Chevy | | | | | | | | | | | | | | | | POC; 27 | | | | | | | | | | | | | | | | | | 38th | 317 |
| 2021 | Spencer Boyd | 90 | Chevy | | | | | | | | | | | | | | | | | | | | | | | | | RCH; 33 | BRI; 31 | LVS; 25 | | | TEX; 28 | KAN; 31 | | PHO; DNQ | 38th | 317 |
| 2022 | Alex Labbé | 90 | Chevy | DAY; DNQ | | | | | | | | | | | | | | | | | | | | | | | | | | | | | | | | | 55th | 0 |
| 2022 | Dexter Bean | 90 | Chevy | | CAL; Wth | LVS | PHO | ATL | COA | RCH | MAR | TAL | DOV | DAR | TEX | CLT | POR | NSH | ROA | ATL | NHA | POC | | | | | | | | | | | | | | | 55th | 0 |
| 2022 | Mason Filippi | 90 | Chevy | | | | | | | | | | | | | | | | | | | | IRC; DNQ | MCH | GLN | DAY | DAR | KAN | BRI | TEX | TAL | ROV | LVS | HOM | MAR | PHO | 55th | 0 |

=== Car No. 91 history ===
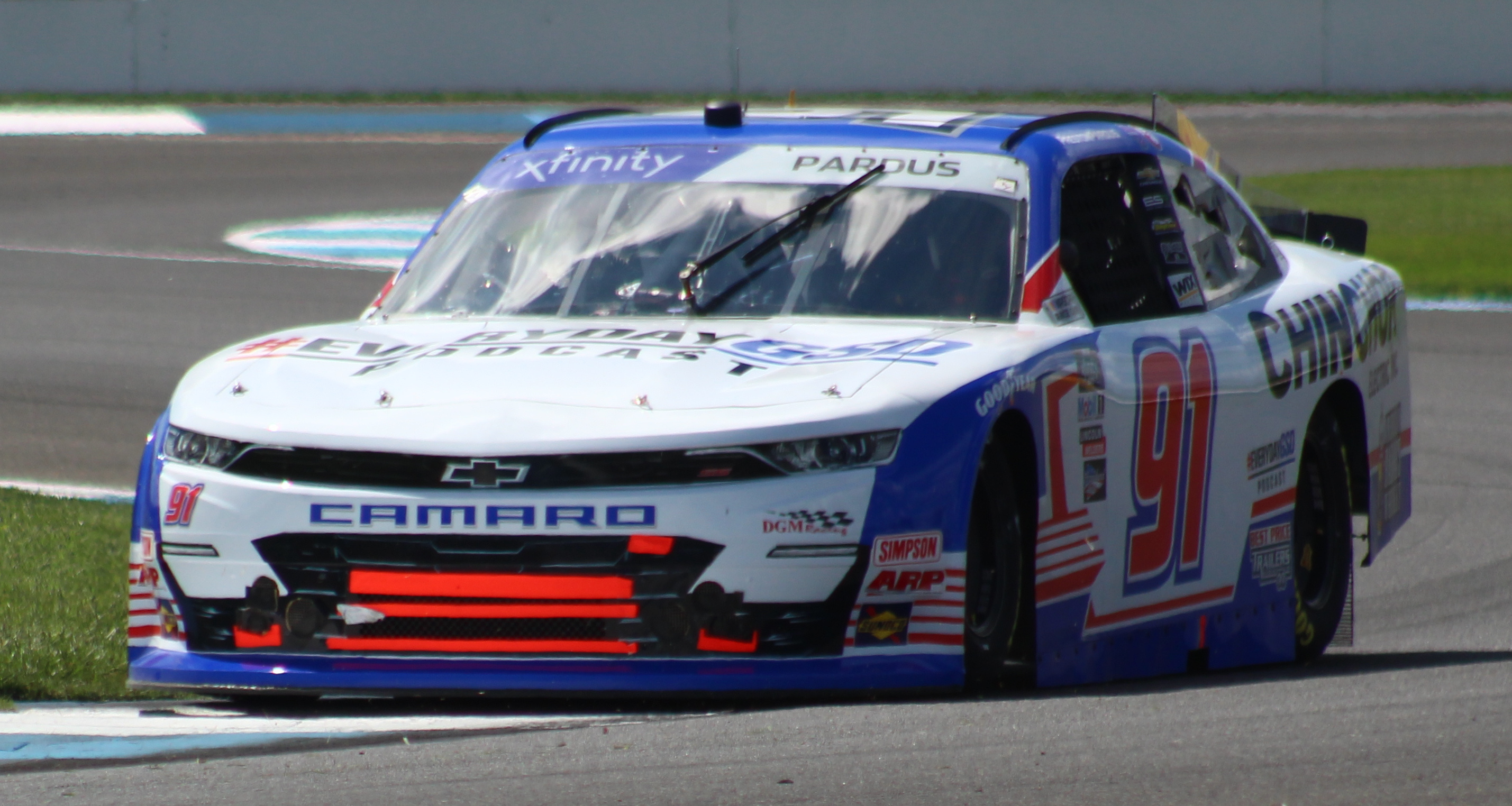
Preston Pardus in the No. 91 at Indianapolis in 2022

In 2020, it was revealed that the team would be fielding a fourth car for the first time, with team owner Mario Gosselin piloting the No. 91 in the season-opener at Daytona for his first Xfinity start as a driver since 2017. It was unclear if the car will attempt additional races throughout the season. Gosselin failed to qualify as rain washed out qualifying. Preston Pardus was to drive the 91 at the Daytona Road Course but was excluded from the field due to the team being outside of the top 35 in owners' points and the lack of qualifying, so he was moved over to the No. 90. Pardus successfully qualified the car at COTA.

For 2022, the 91 car would run full-time with Mason Massey as the primary driver while Preston Pardus would drive the car in five road course events. Mason Filippi would drive the No. 91 in Portland, the other road course event that Preston Pardus didn't compete with DGM racing in.

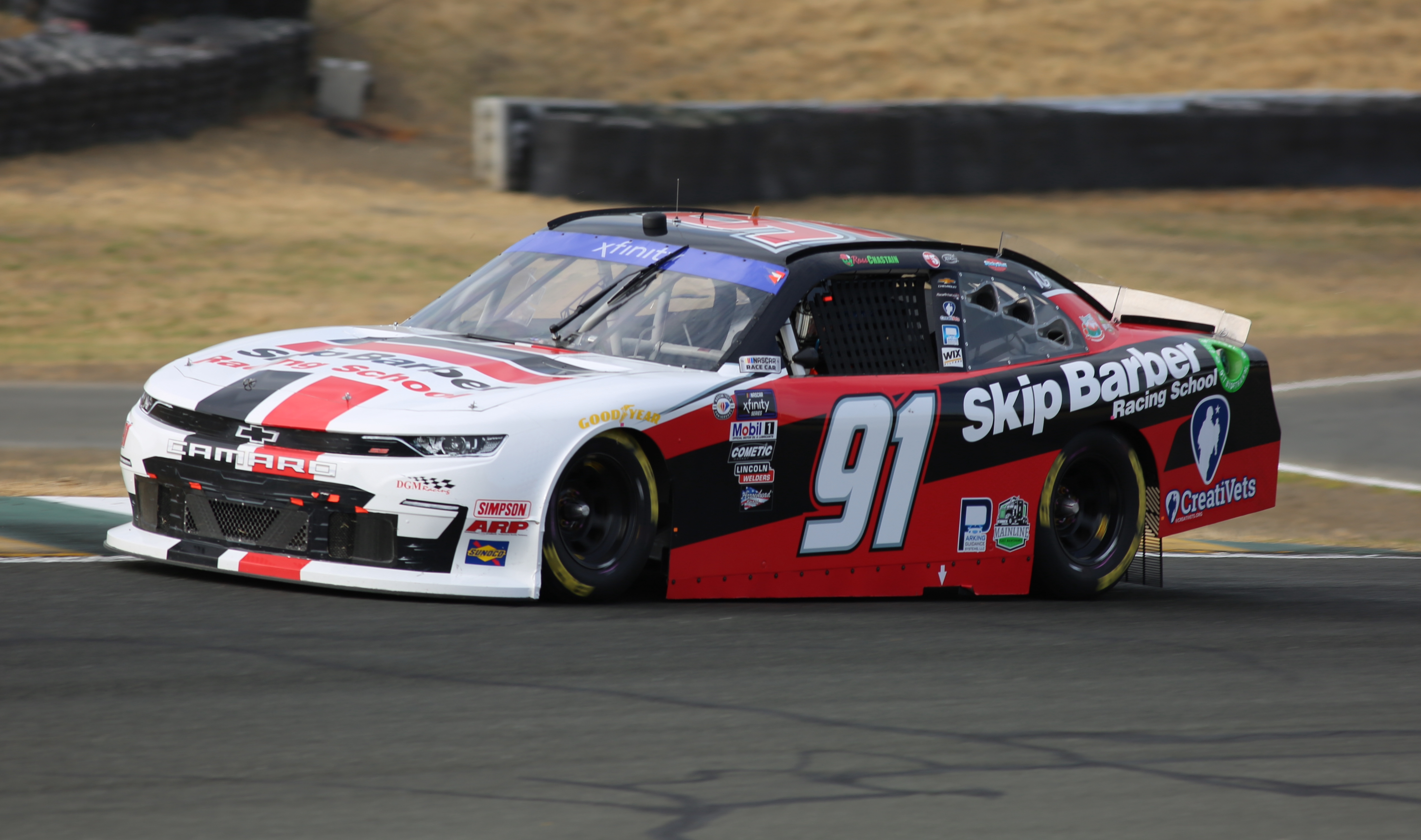
Ross Chastain in the No. 91 at Sonoma in 2023.

For the 2023 season, DGM did a rotating set of drivers for the full-time No. 91. The drivers who drove the No. 91 were Josh Bilicki, Ross Chastain, Garrett Smithley, Chad Chastain, Alex Labbé, Kyle Weatherman, Dexter Bean, and Alex Guenette.

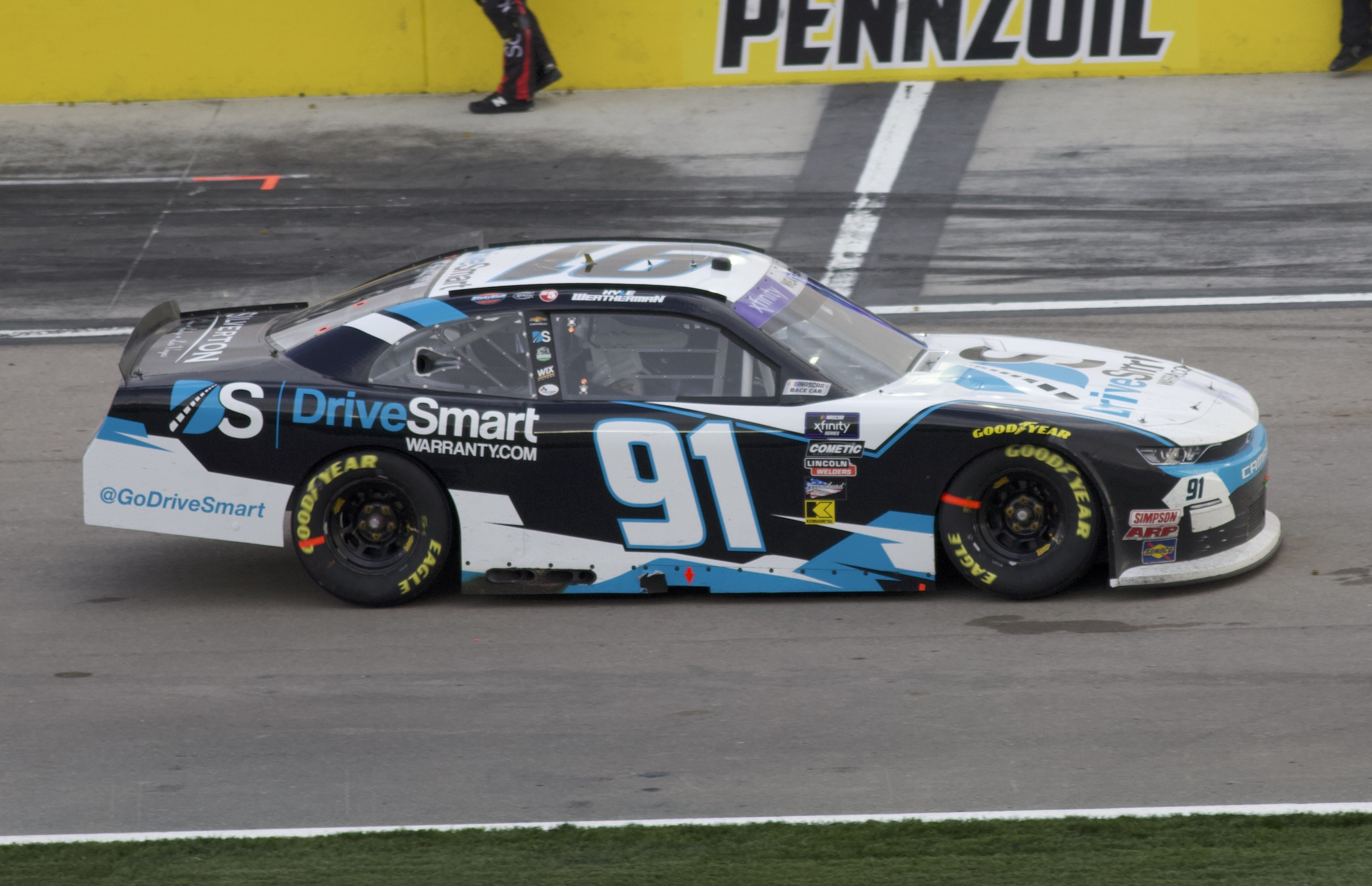
Kyle Weatherman in the No. 91 at Las Vegas in 2024.

After a full-time season in 2023 with rotating drivers, it was announced on November 14, 2023 that Kyle Weatherman would drive the No. 91 full-time in 2024. Following the Portland race, Weatherman was fined US$25,000 for intentionally damaging another vehicle on pit road.

In 2025, Josh Bilicki was tapped as the primary driver of the No. 91 car. At Daytona Bilicki was rear-ended on pit road by Kris Wright on Lap 86 after Wright failed to hit the brakes on his car. The impact sent the rear of Bilicki's car into the air. Wright's car was heavily damaged and despite the impact, Bilicki's car suffered minimal damage and he was able to continue in the race while Wright's race was over. Bilicki went on to finish in fourteenth place in the race. Myatt Snider drove the No. 91 car at four races. C. J. McLaughlin drove the No. 91 car at three races. Jesse Iwuji drove the No. 91 at Talladega. On May 29, 2025, it was announced that Andrés Pérez de Lara would make his NASCAR Xfinity Series debut at Autódromo Hermanos Rodríguez, driving the No. 91 Chevrolet. On August 25, 2025, DGM announced that Josh Williams would drive the No. 91 for the Portland race. On August 27, 2025, it was announced that Matt Mills would drive the No. 91 Chevrolet at Gateway. Mason Maggio would drive the No. 91 at fall Talladega race.

In 2026, Maggio was tapped as the primary driver of the No. 91 Chevrolet. Carson Kvapil would compete in four NASCAR O'Reilly Auto Parts Series races in the No. 91 to fill out his 2026 full time schedule. Alex Labbé would drive the No. 91 at Darlington. Ross Chastain would drive the No. 91 at Martinsville. Snider would return to drive the No. 91 at Dover, Chicagoland, and fall Charlotte race. Dexter Bean would drive the No. 91 at Pocono. Iwuji would drive the No. 91 at San Diego. Derek Lemke will make his NASCAR O'Reilly Auto Parts Series debut at Iowa, driving the No. 91. Stefan Parsons would drive the No. 91 at Bristol night race. Leland Honeyman would drive the No. 91 at fall Phoenix race.

==== Car No. 91 results ====
| Year | Driver | No. | Make | 1 | 2 | 3 | 4 | 5 | 6 | 7 | 8 | 9 | 10 | 11 | 12 | 13 | 14 | 15 | 16 | 17 | 18 | 19 | 20 | 21 | 22 | 23 | 24 | 25 | 26 | 27 | 28 | 29 | 30 | 31 | 32 | 33 | Owners | Pts |
|---|---|---|---|---|---|---|---|---|---|---|---|---|---|---|---|---|---|---|---|---|---|---|---|---|---|---|---|---|---|---|---|---|---|---|---|---|---|---|
| 2021 | Mario Gosselin | 91 | Chevy | DAY; DNQ | | | | | | | | | | | | | | | | | | | | | | | | | | | | | | | | | 43rd | 23 |
| 2021 | Preston Pardus | 91 | Chevy | | DAY; DNQ | HOM | LVS | PHO | ATL | MAR | TAL | DAR | DOV | COA; 14 | CLT | MOH | TEX | NSH | POC | ROA | ATL | NHA | GLN | IND | MCH | DAY | DAR | RCH | BRI | LVS | TAL | CLT | TEX | KAN | MAR | PHO | 43rd | 23 |
| 2022 | Mason Massey | 91 | Chevy | DAY; DNQ | CAL; 28 | LVS; 27 | PHO; 23 | ATL; 6 | | RCH; 17 | MAR; 33 | TAL; 37 | DOV; 34 | DAR; 22 | TEX; 18 | CLT; DNQ | | NSH; DNQ | | ATL; 24 | NHA; 9 | POC; 24 | | MCH; 24 | | DAY; 33 | DAR; 20 | KAN; 31 | BRI; 32 | TEX; 32 | TAL; 38 | | LVS; 29 | HOM; 37 | MAR; 25 | PHO; 33 | 33rd | 368 |
| 2022 | Preston Pardus | 91 | Chevy | | | | | | COA; 14 | | | | | | | | | | ROA; 11 | | | | IND; 29 | | GLN; 21 | | | | | | | ROV; 21 | | | | | 33rd | 368 |
| 2022 | Mason Filippi | 91 | Chevy | | | | | | | | | | | | | | POR; 25 | | | | | | | | | | | | | | | | | | | | 33rd | 368 |
| 2023 | Josh Bilicki | 91 | Chevy | DAY; DNQ | | LVS; 31 | | | COA; 28 | | | TAL; 26 | | | | | | | | ATL; 18 | | | ROA; 8 | | | | | | | BRI; 27 | | | | | MAR; 23 | | 26th | 438 |
| 2023 | Ross Chastain | 91 | Chevy | | CAL; 24 | | | | | | | | | DAR; 19 | | | SON; 18 | | | | | | | | IRC; 37 | GLN; 4 | | DAR; 23 | | | | | | | | | 26th | 438 |
| 2023 | Garrett Smithley | 91 | Chevy | | | | PHO; 32 | | | | | | | | | | | | | | | | | | | | | | | | | | | | | | 26th | 438 |
| 2023 | Chad Chastain | 91 | Chevy | | | | | ATL; 24 | | | | | DOV; 32 | | | | | NSH; 29 | | | | POC; 30 | | | | | | | | | | | | | | | 26th | 438 |
| 2023 | Alex Labbé | 91 | Chevy | | | | | | | RCH; 11 | MAR; 26 | | | | | PIR; 11 | | | | | NHA; 12 | | | | | | | | | | | ROV; 15 | | | | | 26th | 438 |
| 2023 | Kyle Weatherman | 91 | Chevy | | | | | | | | | | | | CLT; 20 | | | | | | | | | MCH; 35 | | | | | KAN; 38 | | TEX; 15 | | LVS; 36 | HOM; 16 | | PHO; 17 | 26th | 438 |
| 2023 | Dexter Bean | 91 | Chevy | | | | | | | | | | | | | | | | CSC; DNQ | | | | | | | | | | | | | | | | | | 26th | 438 |
| 2023 | Alex Guenette | 91 | Chevy | | | | | | | | | | | | | | | | | | | | | | | | DAY; 38 | | | | | | | | | | 26th | 438 |
| 2024 | Kyle Weatherman | 91 | Chevy | DAY; 38 | ATL; 17 | LVS; 21 | PHO; 16 | COA; 29 | RCH; 17 | MAR; 33 | TEX; 36 | TAL; 27 | DOV; 8 | DAR; 17 | CLT; 11 | PIR; 25 | SON; 30 | IOW; 33 | NHA; 25 | NSH; 31 | CSC; 14 | POC; 23 | IND; 25 | MCH; 32 | DAY; 10 | DAR; 37 | ATL; 11 | | BRI; 26 | KAN; 26 | TAL; 31 | | LVS; 20 | HOM; 14 | | | 24th | 486 |
| 2024 | Josh Bilicki | 91 | Chevy | | | | | | | | | | | | | | | | | | | | | | | | | GLN; 10 | | | | | | | | PHO; 21 | 24th | 486 |
| 2024 | Alex Labbé | 91 | Chevy | | | | | | | | | | | | | | | | | | | | | | | | | | | | | ROV; 14 | | | | | 24th | 486 |
| 2024 | Myatt Snider | 91 | Chevy | | | | | | | | | | | | | | | | | | | | | | | | | | | | | | | | MAR; 10 | | 24th | 486 |
| 2025 | Josh Bilicki | 91 | Chevy | DAY; 14 | ATL; 30 | COA; 22 | PHO; 23 | LVS; 31 | | | DAR; 24 | | CAR; 17 | | TEX; 28 | | | | POC; 23 | | CSC; 35 | SON; 14 | DOV; 34 | IND; 19 | IOW; 21 | GLN; 27 | DAY; 18 | | | BRI; 29 | | ROV; 21 | | | | PHO; 32 | 30th | 414 |
| 2025 | Myatt Snider | 91 | Chevy | | | | | | HOM; 30 | MAR; 33 | | | | | | | NSH; 22 | | | | | | | | | | | | | | | | | | MAR; 14 | | 30th | 414 |
| 2025 | C. J. McLaughlin | 91 | Chevy | | | | | | | | | BRI; 33 | | | | CLT; 29 | | | | ATL; 28 | | | | | | | | | | | | | | | | | 30th | 414 |
| 2025 | Jesse Iwuji | 91 | Chevy | | | | | | | | | | | TAL; 20 | | | | | | | | | | | | | | | | | | | | | | | 30th | 414 |
| 2025 | Andrés Pérez de Lara | 91 | Chevy | | | | | | | | | | | | | | | MXC; 30 | | | | | | | | | | | | | | | | | | | 30th | 414 |
| 2025 | Josh Williams | 91 | Chevy | | | | | | | | | | | | | | | | | | | | | | | | | PIR; 23 | | | KAN; 24 | | LVS; 23 | | | | 30th | 414 |
| 2025 | Matt Mills | 91 | Chevy | | | | | | | | | | | | | | | | | | | | | | | | | | GTW; 21 | | | | | | | | 30th | 414 |
| 2025 | Mason Maggio | 91 | Chevy | | | | | | | | | | | | | | | | | | | | | | | | | | | | | | | TAL; 22 | | | 30th | 414 |
| 2026 | Mason Maggio | 91 | Chevy | DAY; 38 | ATL; 26 | | PHO; 32 | LVS; 28 | | | | BRI; 37 | KAN; 33 | TAL; 17 | TEX; 32 | | | | NSH; 28 | | | | | ATL; 11 | IND; 26 | | DAY; 19 | DAR; 35 | GTW; 21 | | LVS; 33 | | | TAL; 12 | MAR; 36 | HOM; 36 | 29th | 427 |
| 2026 | Carson Kvapil | 91 | Chevy | | | COA; 19 | | | | | | | | | | GLN; 14 | | CLT; 9 | | | | SON; 6 | | | | | | | | | | | | | | | 29th | 427 |
| 2026 | Alex Labbé | 91 | Chevy | | | | | | DAR; 38 | | ROC; 18 | | | | | | | | | | | | | | | | | | | | | | | | | | 29th | 427 |
| 2026 | Ross Chastain | 91 | Chevy | | | | | | | MAR; 8 | | | | | | | | | | | | | | | | | | | | | | | | | | | 29th | 427 |
| 2026 | Myatt Snider | 91 | Chevy | | | | | | | | | | | | | | DOV; 24 | | | | | | CHI; 23 | | | | | | | | | CLT; 25 | | | | | 29th | 427 |
| 2026 | Dexter Bean | 91 | Chevy | | | | | | | | | | | | | | | | | POC; 30 | | | | | | | | | | | | | | | | | 29th | 427 |
| 2026 | Jesse Iwuji | 91 | Chevy | | | | | | | | | | | | | | | | | | COR; 25 | | | | | | | | | | | | | | | | 29th | 427 |
| 2026 | Derek Lemke | 91 | Chevy | | | | | | | | | | | | | | | | | | | | | | | IOW; 26 | | | | | | | | | | | 29th | 427 |
| 2026 | Stefan Parsons | 91 | Chevy | | | | | | | | | | | | | | | | | | | | | | | | | | | BRI; 21 | | | | | | | 29th | 427 |
| 2026 | Leland Honeyman | 91 | Chevy | | | | | | | | | | | | | | | | | | | | | | | | | | | | | | PHO; 34 | | | | 29th | 427 |

=== Car No. 92 history ===
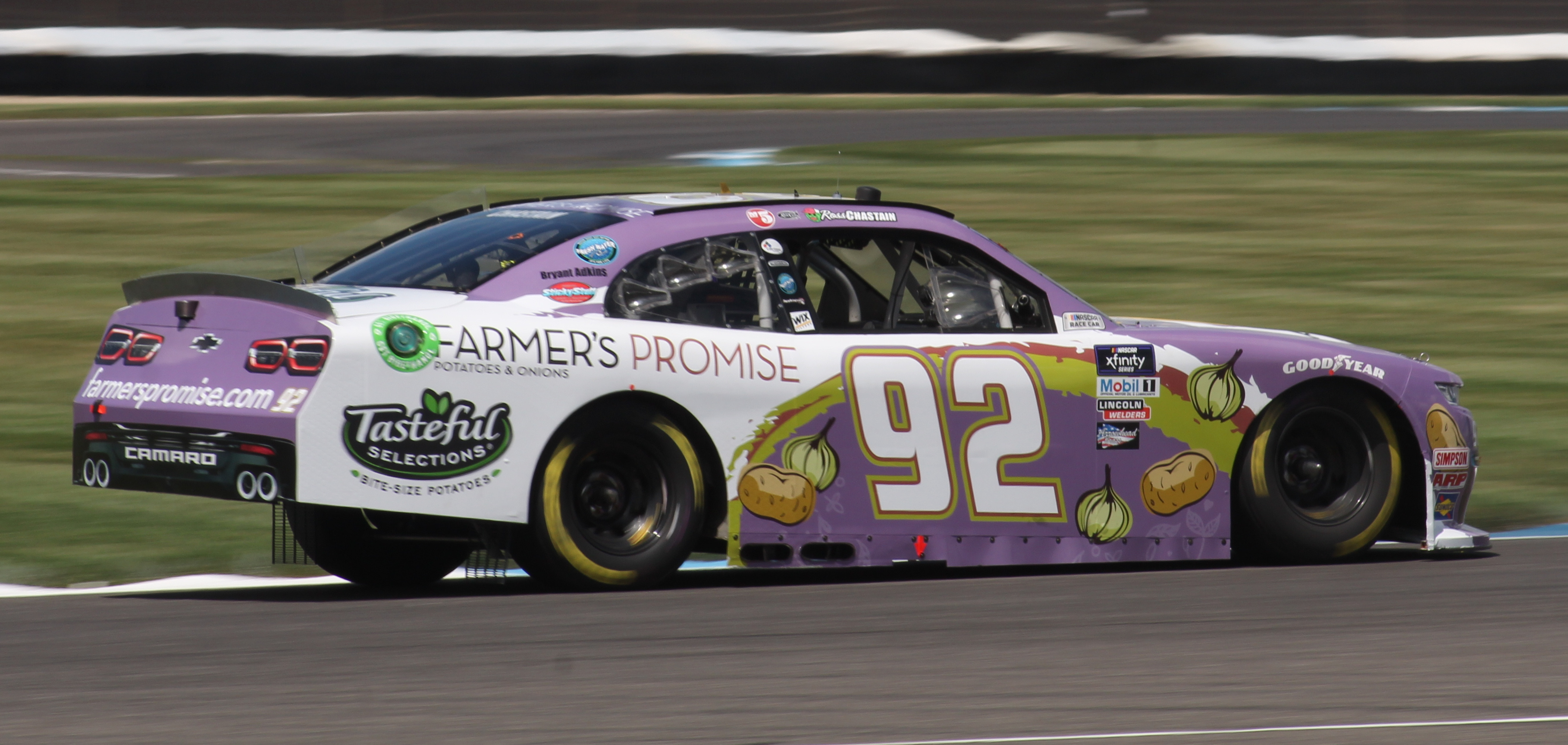
Ross Chastain in the No. 92 at Indianapolis in 2022

The No. 92 is the second team for DGM Racing and the team was created in 2015. The No. 92 runs a limited schedule with various drivers. This team is sometimes a late-entry to complete the 38-car field, and almost always is a start and park car.

In 2020, it was announced that Josh Williams would drive the 92 full-time. Williams earned his best career finish, finishing sixth at Kansas.

In 2021, Williams returned for another full-time season.

In 2022, Williams left for B. J. McLeod Motorsports and Kyle Weatherman joined the DGM in the No. 92 for at least five races. On March 28, DGM announced it would scale back the No. 92 to a part-time schedule. A day later, DGM sold the No. 92's points to SS-Green Light Racing for its No. 08 entry.

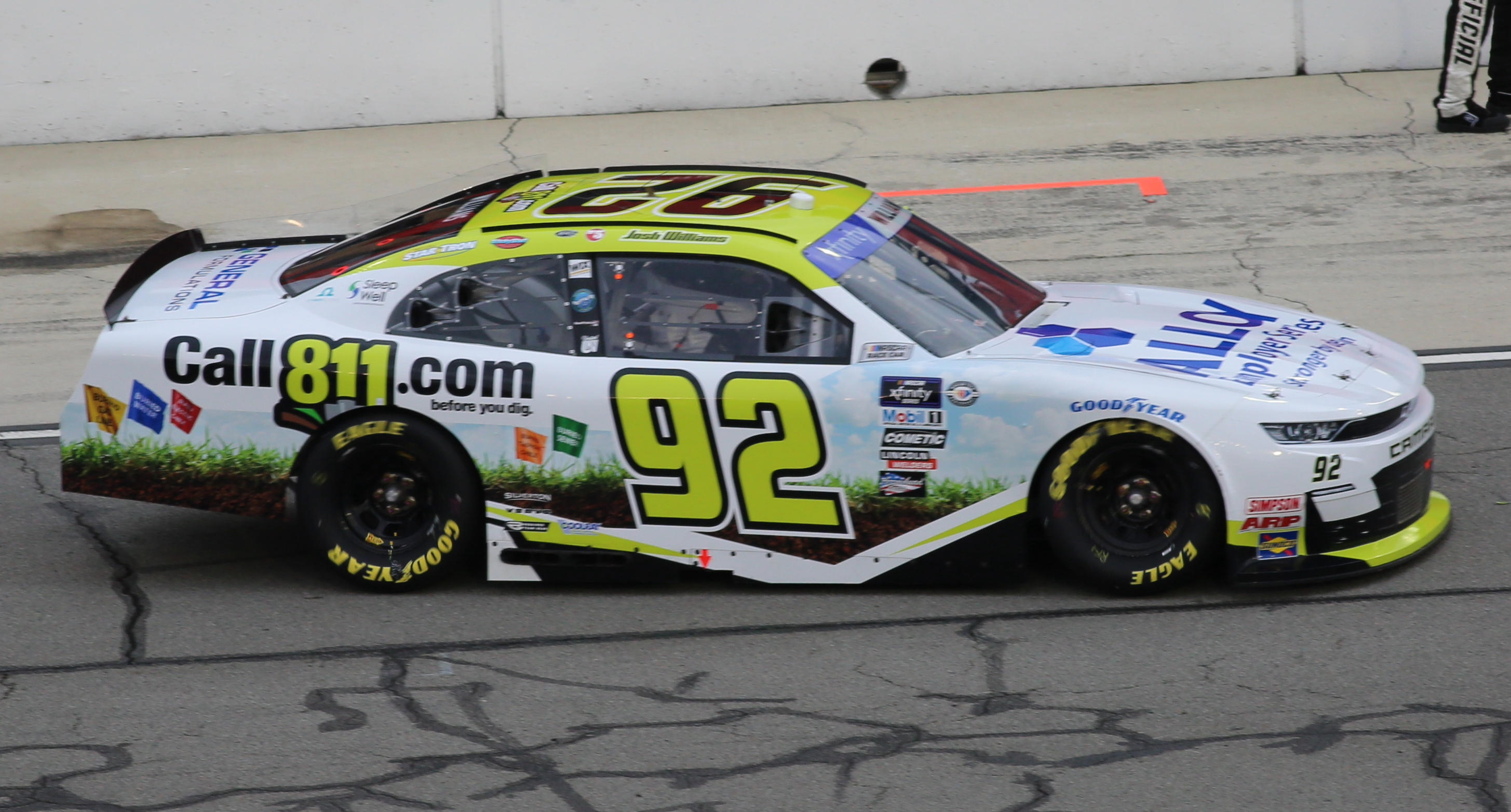
Josh Williams in the No. 92 at Fontana in 2023.

In 2023, Williams returned to the No. 92 car full-time. At Atlanta, he sustained heavy damage on lap 27; when debris from his repaired car caused another caution, NASCAR parked him under the Damaged Vehicle Policy. In response, Williams stopped his car on the start/finish line and walked back to pit road. On March 21, he was suspended for the COTA for his actions. A day later, on March 22, DGM Racing announced that Alex Labbé would be the replacement driver. He would finish fifteenth.

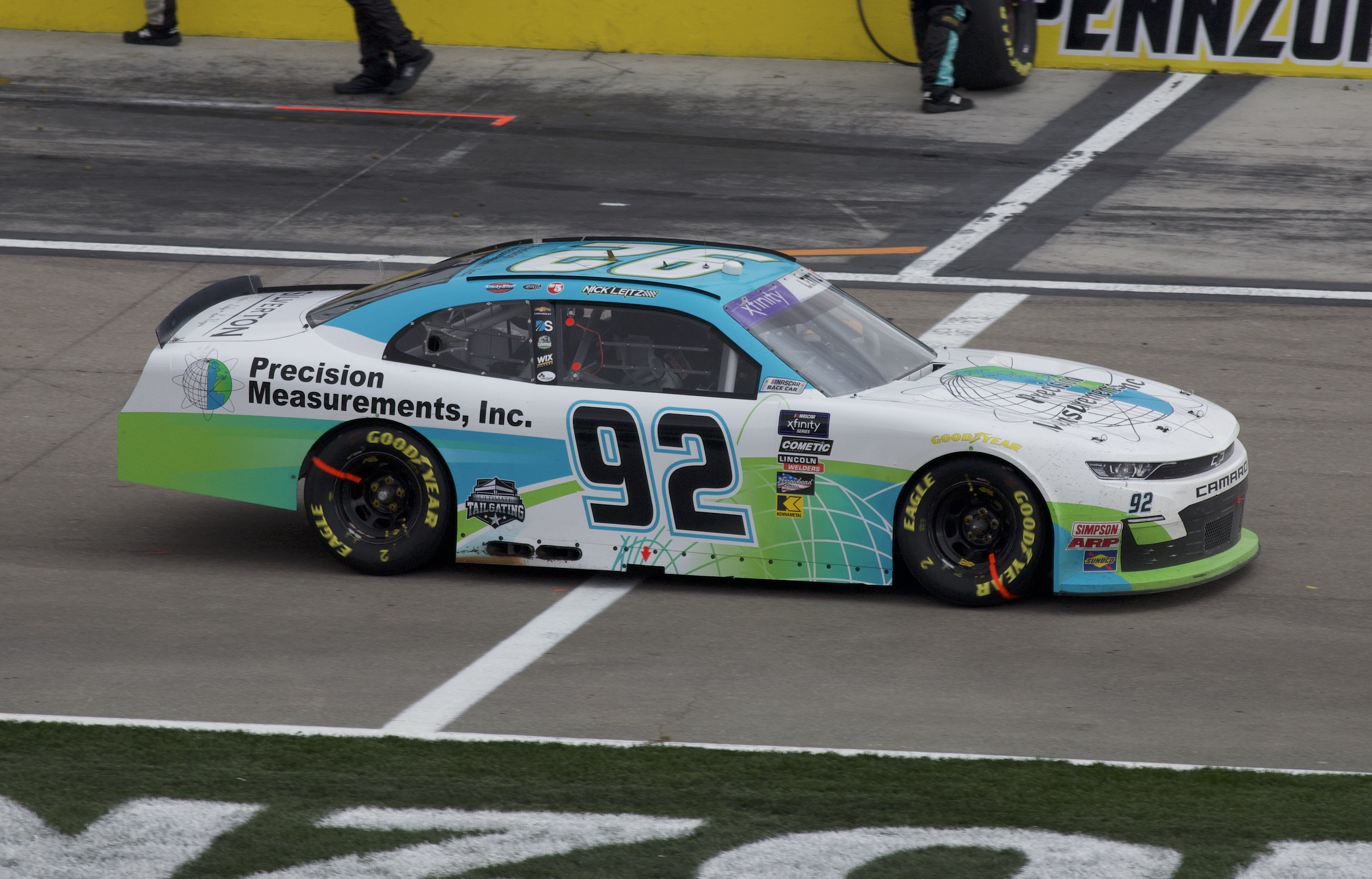
Nick Leitz in the No. 92 at Las Vegas in 2024.

After Josh Williams would leave for the Kaulig Racing No. 11 for the 2024 season in the Xfinity Series, it was announced that Josh Bilicki would run select races for DGM Racing. It was also announced on February 14, 2024 that Nick Leitz would run the races at Atlanta and at Las Vegas in the No. 92. Dexter Bean, Kaden Honeycutt, Natalie Decker, Nathan Byrd, Ross Chastain, and Dawson Cram drove the No. 92 in the other races, with the team's best finish of 2024 being Chastain's sixth place finish at Watkins Glen.

The No. 92 scaled back to a part–time schedule in 2025. C. J. McLaughlin attempted to qualify for the season opener at Daytona in the No. 92. However, he failed to qualify for the race. Natalie Decker drove the No. 92 car at summer Daytona race to a 22nd place finish. Leland Honeyman drove the No. 92 car at Charlotte roval. He finished 26th.

On November 14, 2025, DGM announced that Josh Williams would yet again return to the team in 2026 to drive the No. 92 on a multi-year agreement. At Watkins Glen, Alex Guenette would drive the No. 92 due to Williams' newly onboarded partner failing to meet its contractual obligations. B. J. McLeod would drive the No. 92 at Dover. Honeyman would return to drive the No. 92 at Charlotte, Nashville, Pocono, San Diego, Chicagoland, and Atlanta. Preston Pardus would drive the No. 92 at Indianapolis and September Darlington race. Mason Maggio would drive the No. 92 at Iowa and fall Charlotte race. Alex Labbé would drive the No. 92 at fall Martinsville race.

==== Car No. 92 results ====
| Year | Driver | No. | Make | 1 | 2 | 3 | 4 | 5 | 6 | 7 | 8 | 9 | 10 | 11 | 12 | 13 | 14 | 15 | 16 | 17 | 18 | 19 | 20 | 21 | 22 | 23 | 24 | 25 | 26 | 27 | 28 | 29 | 30 | 31 | 32 | 33 | Owners | Pts |
|---|---|---|---|---|---|---|---|---|---|---|---|---|---|---|---|---|---|---|---|---|---|---|---|---|---|---|---|---|---|---|---|---|---|---|---|---|---|---|
| 2015 | Dexter Bean | 92 | Chevy | DAY; 40 | ATL | LVS; DNQ | PHO | CAL | TEX | BRI | RCH | TAL | IOW | CLT | DOV | MCH | CHI | DAY; 40 | KEN | NHA | IND | IOW | GLN | MOH | BRI | ROA | DAR | RCH | CHI; 39 | | DOV; 38 | CLT | | | | | | |
| 2015 | Mario Gosselin | 92 | Chevy | | | | | | | | | | | | | | | | | | | | | | | | | | | KEN; DNQ | | | KAN; Wth | TEX; 39 | | | | |
| 2015 | B. J. McLeod | 92 | Chevy | | | | | | | | | | | | | | | | | | | | | | | | | | | | | | | | PHO; 37 | HOM; 38 | | |
| 2016 | Mario Gosselin | 92 | Chevy | DAY; DNQ | | | | | | | | | | | | MCH; 35 | | | | | | | | MOH; 39 | BRI | ROA | | | | | | | | | | | | |
| 2016 | Dexter Bean | 92 | Chevy | | ATL | LVS | PHO | CAL | TEX | BRI | RCH | TAL | DOV | CLT | POC | | IOW; 36 | DAY | KEN; 36 | | | IOW; DNQ | GLN | | | | DAR; 38 | RCH | CHI; 36 | | | | | | | | | |
| 2016 | Josh Williams | 92 | Chevy | | | | | | | | | | | | | | | | | NHA; DNQ | IND | | | | | | | | | KEN; 37 | DOV | CLT | KAN | TEX | PHO | HOM | | |
| 2017 | Josh Williams | 92 | Chevy | DAY | ATL | LVS | PHO | CAL | TEX | BRI | RCH | TAL | CLT | DOV | POC | MCH; 34 | IOW | DAY; 40 | KEN | NHA | IND | IOW | GLN | MOH | BRI | ROA | DAR | RCH | CHI | | | | | TEX; 34 | PHO | HOM | | |
| 2017 | Dexter Bean | 92 | Chevy | | | | | | | | | | | | | | | | | | | | | | | | | | | KEN; 38 | DOV | CLT; DNQ | KAN | | | | | |
| 2018 | Dexter Bean | 92 | Chevy | DAY | ATL | LVS | PHO | CAL | TEX | BRI | RCH | TAL | DOV | CLT | POC | MCH | IOW | CHI | DAY | KEN | NHA | IOW; 36 | GLN | MOH | BRI | ROA | DAR | IND | LVS | RCH | CLT | DOV | KAN | TEX | PHO | | | |
| 2018 | Josh Williams | 92 | Chevy | | | | | | | | | | | | | | | | | | | | | | | | | | | | | | | | | HOM; DNQ | | |
| 2019 | Josh Williams | 92 | Chevy | DAY | ATL | LVS | PHO | CAL | TEX | BRI | RCH; DNQ | TAL | DOV | | | | | | | | | | | | | | | | | | | | | | | | | |
| 2019 | Ronnie Bassett Jr. | 92 | Chevy | | | | | | | | | | | CLT; 25 | POC | MCH | IOW | CHI | DAY | KEN | NHA | IOW | GLN | MOH | BRI | ROA | DAR | IND | LVS | RCH | CLT | DOV | | | | | | |
| 2019 | Dillon Bassett | 92 | Chevy | | | | | | | | | | | | | | | | | | | | | | | | | | | | | | KAN; 16 | TEX | | | | |
| 2019 | Dexter Bean | 92 | Chevy | | | | | | | | | | | | | | | | | | | | | | | | | | | | | | | | PHO; 35 | HOM | | |
| 2020 | Josh Williams | 92 | Chevy | DAY; 26 | LVS; 13 | CAL; 10 | PHO; 16 | DAR; 16 | CLT; 14 | BRI; 9 | ATL; 28 | HOM; 20 | HOM; 12 | TAL; 33 | POC; 34 | IND; 22 | KEN; 26 | KEN; 15 | TEX; 22 | KAN; 20 | ROA; 13 | DAY; 24 | DOV; 24 | DOV; 22 | DAY; 9 | DAR; 15 | RCH; 22 | RCH; 25 | BRI; 19 | LVS; 18 | TAL; 7 | CLT; 34 | KAN; 6 | TEX; 9 | MAR; 19 | PHO; 13 | | |
| 2021 | Josh Williams | 92 | Chevy | DAY; 21 | DAY; 17 | HOM; 26 | LVS; 16 | PHO; 21 | ATL; 16 | MAR; 16 | TAL; 28 | DAR; 39 | DOV; 38 | COA; DNQ | CLT; 21 | MOH; 10 | TEX; 17 | NSH; 21 | POC; 40 | ROA; 17 | ATL; 18 | NHA; 22 | GLN; 14 | IND; 15 | MCH; 18 | DAY; 17 | DAR; 15 | RCH; 23 | BRI; 20 | LVS; 24 | TAL; 14 | CLT; 11 | TEX; 19 | KAN; 26 | MAR; 11 | PHO; 32 | 19th | 531 |
| 2022 | Kyle Weatherman | 92 | Chevy | DAY; 32 | CAL; 16 | LVS; 26 | PHO; 30 | ATL; 8 | | | | | | | | | | | | | | | | | | | | | | | | | | | | | 40th | 115 |
| 2022 | Ross Chastain | 92 | Chevy | | | | | | COA; 17 | RCH | MAR | TAL | DOV | DAR | TEX | CLT | PIR | NSH | | | | | IND; 4 | MCH | GLN; 28 | | | | | | | | | | | | 40th | 115 |
| 2022 | Dexter Bean | 92 | Chevy | | | | | | | | | | | | | | | | ROA; DNQ | ATL | NHA | POC | | | | | | | | | | | | | | | 40th | 115 |
| 2022 | Josh Williams | 92 | Chevy | | | | | | | | | | | | | | | | | | | | | | | DAY; DNQ | DAR | KAN | BRI; 21 | | TAL | CLT; 37 | LVS | HOM; DNQ | MAR; 22 | | 40th | 115 |
| 2022 | Alex Labbé | 92 | Chevy | | | | | | | | | | | | | | | | | | | | | | | | | | | TEX; 17 | | | | | | PHO; 18 | 40th | 115 |
| 2023 | Josh Williams | 92 | Chevy | DAY; 15 | CAL; 16 | LVS; 30 | PHO; 21 | ATL; 32 | | RCH; 33 | MAR; 19 | TAL; 10 | DOV; 23 | DAR; 17 | CLT; 18 | PIR; 16 | SON; 35 | NSH; 33 | CSC; 36 | ATL; 9 | NHA; 8 | POC; 36 | ROA; 21 | MCH; 22 | IRC; 33 | GLN; 36 | DAY; 27 | DAR; 37 | KAN; 13 | BRI; 20 | TEX; 20 | ROV; 20 | LVS; 33 | HOM; 17 | MAR; 14 | PHO; 25 | 23rd | 468 |
| 2023 | Alex Labbé | 92 | Chevy | | | | | | COA; 15 | | | | | | | | | | | | | | | | | | | | | | | | | | | | 23rd | 468 |
| 2024 | Josh Bilicki | 92 | Chevy | DAY; 32 | | | | COA; 31 | RCH; 19 | | TEX; 29 | TAL; 16 | | DAR; 22 | | | SON; 16 | | | | CSC; 36 | POC; 37 | IND; 27 | MCH; 24 | DAY; 30 | | | | BRI; 20 | | | | | | | | 29th | 399 |
| 2024 | Nick Leitz | 92 | Chevy | | ATL; 26 | LVS; 27 | PHO; 17 | | | | | | | | | | | | | | | | | | | | ATL; 20 | | | | TAL; 37 | | | HOM; 37 | | | 29th | 399 |
| 2024 | Dexter Bean | 92 | Chevy | | | | | | | MAR; 20 | | | | | | | | | | | | | | | | | | | | | | | | | | | 29th | 399 |
| 2024 | Kaden Honeycutt | 92 | Chevy | | | | | | | | | | DOV; 23 | | | | | | | | | | | | | | | | | | | | | | | | 29th | 399 |
| 2024 | Natalie Decker | 92 | Chevy | | | | | | | | | | | | CLT; 29 | | | | | | | | | | | | | | | | | | | | | | 29th | 399 |
| 2024 | Nathan Byrd | 92 | Chevy | | | | | | | | | | | | | PIR; 21 | | | NHA; 36 | | | | | | | | | | | | | | | | | | 29th | 399 |
| 2024 | Ross Chastain | 92 | Chevy | | | | | | | | | | | | | | | IOW; 9 | | NSH; 27 | | | | | | DAR; 12 | | GLN; 6 | | | | | | | | | 29th | 399 |
| 2024 | Dawson Cram | 92 | Chevy | | | | | | | | | | | | | | | | | | | | | | | | | | | KAN; 35 | | ROV; 24 | LVS; 36 | | MAR; 25 | PHO; 32 | 29th | 399 |
| 2025 | C. J. McLaughlin | 92 | Chevy | DAY; DNQ | ATL; 25 | COA | PHO | LVS | HOM | MAR | DAR | BRI | CAR | TAL | TEX; DNQ | CLT | NSH | MXC | POC | ATL | CSC | SON | DOV | IND | IOW | GLN | | | | | | | | | | | 42nd | 38 |
| 2025 | Natalie Decker | 92 | Chevy | | | | | | | | | | | | | | | | | | | | | | | | DAY; 22 | PIR | GTW | BRI | KAN | | | | | | 42nd | 38 |
| 2025 | Leland Honeyman | 92 | Chevy | | | | | | | | | | | | | | | | | | | | | | | | | | | | | ROV; 26 | LVS | TAL | MAR | PHO | 42nd | 38 |
| 2026 | Josh Williams | 92 | Chevy | DAY; 34 | ATL; 27 | COA; DNQ | PHO; DNQ | LVS; 16 | DAR; 24 | MAR; 32 | ROC; 19 | BRI; 29 | KAN; 17 | TAL; 35 | TEX; 18 | | | | | | | SON; 27 | | | | | DAY; 11 | | GTW; 18 | BRI; 28 | LVS; 28 | | PHO; 26 | TAL; 23 | | HOM; 20 | 31st | 378 |
| 2026 | Alex Guenette | 92 | Chevy | | | | | | | | | | | | | GLN; 28 | | | | | | | | | | | | | | | | | | | | | 31st | 378 |
| 2026 | B. J. McLeod | 92 | Chevy | | | | | | | | | | | | | | DOV; 29 | | | | | | | | | | | | | | | | | | | | 31st | 378 |
| 2026 | Leland Honeyman | 92 | Chevy | | | | | | | | | | | | | | | CLT; 15 | NSH; 22 | POC; 33 | COR; 26 | | CHI; 21 | ATL; 38 | | | | | | | | | | | | | 31st | 378 |
| 2026 | Preston Pardus | 92 | Chevy | | | | | | | | | | | | | | | | | | | | | | IND; 30 | | | DAR; 23 | | | | | | | | | 31st | 378 |
| 2026 | Mason Maggio | 92 | Chevy | | | | | | | | | | | | | | | | | | | | | | | IOW; 34 | | | | | | CLT; 26 | | | | | 31st | 378 |
| 2026 | Alex Labbé | 92 | Chevy | | | | | | | | | | | | | | | | | | | | | | | | | | | | | | | | MAR; 22 | | 31st | 378 |

== Camping World Truck Series ==
=== Truck No. 12 history ===
In 2008, DGM fielded the No. 12 Chevrolet Silverado for owner Mario Gosselin. He drove the truck for six races. Scotty Crockett competed in 2 races.

In 2009, Gosselin returned to this truck for fourteen races. Dexter Bean competed in two races at Dover and Milwaukee Mile. Derek White also competed for 2 races in the 12 truck at Martinsville and Phoenix.

In 2010, Gosselin ran full-time in the No. 12 truck after picking up a sponsorship from TireMonkey.com. At the end of the season, Gosselin was forced to sell his owners' points to Johanna Long and her Panhandle Motorsports team for 2011.

In 2012, the No. 12 truck returned for one race with Russ Dugger as the driver.

==== Truck No. 12 results ====
| Year | Driver | No. | Make | 1 | 2 | 3 | 4 | 5 | 6 | 7 | 8 | 9 | 10 | 11 | 12 | 13 | 14 | 15 | 16 | 17 | 18 | 19 | 20 | 21 | 22 | 23 | 24 | 25 | Owners | Pts |
|---|---|---|---|---|---|---|---|---|---|---|---|---|---|---|---|---|---|---|---|---|---|---|---|---|---|---|---|---|---|---|
| 2008 | Mario Gosselin | 12 | Chevy | DAY | CAL | ATL | MAR | KAN; 34 | CLT | | | | MCH; 29 | MLW | | | IRP; 28 | NSH | BRI | GTY | NHA; 27 | LVS | TAL | | ATL; 24 | TEX | PHO | HOM; 24 | | |
| 2008 | Scotty Crockett | 12 | Chevy | | | | | | | MFD; 23 | DOV | TEX | | | MEM; 27 | KEN | | | | | | | | | | | | | | |
| 2008 | J. R. Fitzpatrick | 12 | Chevy | | | | | | | | | | | | | | | | | | | | | MAR; 21 | | | | | | |
| 2009 | Mario Gosselin | 12 | Chevy | DAY; 29 | CAL | ATL; 32 | MAR | KAN | CLT; 17 | | TEX; 29 | MCH; 31 | | MEM; 19 | KEN; 27 | IRP | NSH; 26 | BRI | CHI; 32 | IOW; 20 | GTY; 32 | NHA | LVS | | TAL; 6 | TEX; 21 | | HOM; 20 | | |
| 2009 | Dexter Bean | 12 | Chevy | | | | | | | DOV; 27 | | | MLW; 17 | | | | | | | | | | | | | | | | | |
| 2009 | Derek White | 12 | Chevy | | | | | | | | | | | | | | | | | | | | | MAR; 26 | | | PHO; 24 | | | |
| 2010 | Mario Gosselin | 12 | Chevy | DAY; 23 | ATL; 22 | MAR; 9 | NSH; 21 | KAN; 17 | DOV; 18 | CLT; 20 | TEX; 22 | MCH; 23 | IOW; 12 | GTY; 14 | IRP; 24 | POC; 15 | NSH; 26 | DAR; 23 | BRI; 18 | CHI; 19 | KEN; 16 | NHA; 17 | LVS; 19 | MAR; 35 | TAL; 34 | TEX; 20 | PHO; 34 | HOM; 35 | | |
| 2012 | Russ Dugger | 12 | Chevy | DAY | MAR | CAR | KAN; 33 | CLT | DOV | TEX | KEN | IOW | CHI | POC | MCH | BRI | ATL | IOW | KEN | LVS | TAL | MAR | TEX | PHO | HOM | | | | | |

=== Truck No. 39 history ===
In 2013, DGM fielded the No. 39 Chevrolet Silverado at Canadian Tire Motorsport Park with Alex Guenette as the driver. He was running near the top-ten until oil line issues hampered Guenette's effort, and he finished 25th.

==== Truck No. 39 results ====
| Year | Driver | No. | Make | 1 | 2 | 3 | 4 | 5 | 6 | 7 | 8 | 9 | 10 | 11 | 12 | 13 | 14 | 15 | 16 | 17 | 18 | 19 | 20 | 21 | 22 | Owners | Pts |
|---|---|---|---|---|---|---|---|---|---|---|---|---|---|---|---|---|---|---|---|---|---|---|---|---|---|---|---|
| 2013 | Alex Guenette | 39 | Chevy | DAY | MAR | CAR | KAN | CLT | DOV | TEX | KEN | IOW | ELD | POC | MCH | BRI | MSP; 25 | IOW | CHI | LVS | TAL | MAR | TEX | PHO | HOM | | |

=== Truck No. 72 history ===
In 2009, DGM fielded the No. 72 Chevrolet Silverado part-time. Owner Mario Gosselin drove for 1 race. Clay Rogers also drove for one race. Peyton Sellers also made 1 start in this truck. Michelle Theriault made four starts with this truck. She failed to qualify at one race. John Jackson made five starts in the 72 truck.

In 2010, Johnny Chapman drove this truck for two races. He failed to qualify at one race. Jackson returned to this truck for four races. Caitlin Shaw drove the No. 72 truck at Phoenix.

==== Truck No. 72 results ====
| Year | Driver | No. | Make | 1 | 2 | 3 | 4 | 5 | 6 | 7 | 8 | 9 | 10 | 11 | 12 | 13 | 14 | 15 | 16 | 17 | 18 | 19 | 20 | 21 | 22 | 23 | 24 | 25 | Owners | Pts |
|---|---|---|---|---|---|---|---|---|---|---|---|---|---|---|---|---|---|---|---|---|---|---|---|---|---|---|---|---|---|---|
| 2009 | Clay Rogers | 72 | Chevy | DAY | CAL | ATL; 36 | MAR | KAN | | | | | | | | | | | | | | | | | | | | | | |
| 2009 | John Jackson | 72 | Chevy | | | | | | CLT; 34 | | TEX; 28 | MCH; 36 | | | | | | | | | | | | | | | | | | |
| 2009 | Mario Gosselin | 72 | Chevy | | | | | | | DOV; 36 | | | | | | | | | | | | | | | | | | | | |
| 2009 | Peyton Sellers | 72 | Chevy | | | | | | | | | | MLW; 32 | | | | | | | | | | | | | | | | | |
| 2009 | Michelle Theriault | 72 | Chevy | | | | | | | | | | | MEM; 34 | KEN; 32 | IRP | NSH | BRI | CHI; DNQ | IOW; 36 | GTW | NHA | LVS | MAR | TAL | TEX | PHO | HOM | | |
| 2010 | Johnny Chapman | 72 | Chevy | DAY | ATL | MAR | NSH | KAN | DOV | CLT | TEX | MCH | IOW | GTY; 36 | IRP | POC | NSH | | | CHI; DNQ | | | | | | | | | | |
| 2010 | John Jackson | 72 | Chevy | | | | | | | | | | | | | | | DAR; 35 | BRI | | KEN; 27 | NHA | LVS | MAR | TAL; 36 | TEX | | HOM; 34 | | |
| 2010 | Caitlin Shaw | 72 | Chevy | | | | | | | | | | | | | | | | | | | | | | | | PHO; 30 | | | |

=== Truck No. 74 history ===
In 2014, DGM fielded the No. 74 Chevrolet Silverado as a one-off at Martinsville with Alex Guenette as the driver.

==== Truck No. 74 results ====
| Year | Driver | No. | Make | 1 | 2 | 3 | 4 | 5 | 6 | 7 | 8 | 9 | 10 | 11 | 12 | 13 | 14 | 15 | 16 | 17 | 18 | 19 | 20 | 21 | 22 | Owners | Pts |
|---|---|---|---|---|---|---|---|---|---|---|---|---|---|---|---|---|---|---|---|---|---|---|---|---|---|---|---|
| 2014 | Alex Guenette | 74 | Chevy | DAY | MAR; 36 | KAN | CLT | DOV | TEX | GTW | KEN | IOW | ELD | POC | MCH | BRI | MSP | CHI | NHA | LVS | TAL | MAR | TEX | PHO | HOM | | |

=== Truck No. 84 history ===
In 2013, DGM fielded the No. 84 Chevrolet Silverado at Canadian Tire Motorsport Park with Martin Roy as the driver. Roy qualified 21st and finished fourteenth.

==== Truck No. 84 results ====
| Year | Driver | No. | Make | 1 | 2 | 3 | 4 | 5 | 6 | 7 | 8 | 9 | 10 | 11 | 12 | 13 | 14 | 15 | 16 | 17 | 18 | 19 | 20 | 21 | 22 | Owners | Pts |
|---|---|---|---|---|---|---|---|---|---|---|---|---|---|---|---|---|---|---|---|---|---|---|---|---|---|---|---|
| 2013 | Martin Roy | 84 | Chevy | DAY | MAR | CAR | KAN | CLT | DOV | TEX | KEN | IOW | ELD | POC | MCH | BRI | MSP; 14 | IOW | CHI | LVS | TAL | MAR | TEX | PHO | HOM | | |

=== Truck No. 92 history ===
In 2009, DGM fielded the No. 92 Chevrolet Silverado part-time. John Jackson made 3 starts in this truck. He failed to qualify at two races. Derek White made one start in the No. 92 truck at Homestead. He failed to qualify for the race.

==== Truck No. 92 results ====
| Year | Driver | No. | Make | 1 | 2 | 3 | 4 | 5 | 6 | 7 | 8 | 9 | 10 | 11 | 12 | 13 | 14 | 15 | 16 | 17 | 18 | 19 | 20 | 21 | 22 | 23 | 24 | 25 | Owners | Pts |
|---|---|---|---|---|---|---|---|---|---|---|---|---|---|---|---|---|---|---|---|---|---|---|---|---|---|---|---|---|---|---|
| 2009 | John Jackson | 92 | Chevy | DAY | CAL | ATL | MAR | KAN | CLT | DOV | TEX | MCH | MLW | MEM | KEN | IRP | NSH | BRI | CHI; DNQ | IOW; 31 | GTY | NHA | LVS | MAR | TAL | TEX; DNQ | PHO | | | |
| 2009 | Derek White | 92 | Chevy | | | | | | | | | | | | | | | | | | | | | | | | | HOM; DNQ | | |

== ARCA Racing Series ==
=== Car No. 10 history ===
In 2010, DGM fielded the No. 10 Chevrolet for Nur Ali at Texas.

==== Car No. 10 results ====
| Year | Driver | No. | Make | 1 | 2 | 3 | 4 | 5 | 6 | 7 | 8 | 9 | 10 | 11 | 12 | 13 | 14 | 15 | 16 | 17 | 18 | 19 | 20 | Owners | Pts |
|---|---|---|---|---|---|---|---|---|---|---|---|---|---|---|---|---|---|---|---|---|---|---|---|---|---|
| 2010 | Nur Ali | 10 | Chevy | DAY | PBE | SLM | TEX; 22 | TAL | TOL | POC | MCH | IOW | MFD | POC | BLN | NJE | ISF | CHI | DSF | TOL | SLM | KAN | CAR | | |

=== Car No. 12 history ===
In 2002, DGM fielded the No. 12 Chevrolet for owner Mario Gosselin at Pocono. He finished third.

In 2003, Gosselin attempted to run five races in the No. 12 car. He failed to qualify the race at Charlotte and won the race Nashville.

In 2004, Gosselin only made one race in the No. 12 car at Nashville. He finished fourth.

In 2005, Gosselin made 6 starts in the No. 12 Chevrolet while Dawayne Bryan made one start in a Dodge. Burney Lamar also made one start in a Chevrolet.

In 2006, Gosselin made twelve starts in the No. 12 car. He failed to qualify at Winchester Speedway and won a race at Nashville. He failed to qualify the race. Bryan returned for two races with the No. 12 Dodge. Justin Drawdy made one start with the No. 12 Chevrolet. Corie Stott made one start with the No. 12 Pontiac. Billy Shotko drove for one race in a Chevrolet. Billy Leslie made 1 start in a Ford.

In 2007, Gosselin returned for seven races in the No. 12 car. Shotko returned for one race at Berlin Raceway. Michael Phelps made one start in the No. 12 car at Toledo Speedway.

In 2008, Alli Owens drove the No. 12 ElectriyingCareers.com Chevrolet. In her twelve races that year, she had a best race finish of fifteenth place, which she achieved on three separate occasions (Rockingham, Kentucky and Chicago).

In 2009, Gosselin made one start in the No. 12 car at Daytona. Darwin Greene made three starts in the 12 car.

In 2010, Russ Dugger made three starts in the No. 12 car.

==== Car No. 12 results ====
| Year | Driver | No. | Make | 1 | 2 | 3 | 4 | 5 | 6 | 7 | 8 | 9 | 10 | 11 | 12 | 13 | 14 | 15 | 16 | 17 | 18 | 19 | 20 | 21 | 22 | 23 | Owners | Pts |
|---|---|---|---|---|---|---|---|---|---|---|---|---|---|---|---|---|---|---|---|---|---|---|---|---|---|---|---|---|
| 2002 | Mario Gosselin | 12 | Chevy | DAY | ATL | NSH | SLM | KEN | CLT | KAN | POC | MCH | TOL | SBO | KEN | BLN | POC; 3 | NSH | ISF | WIN | DSF | CHI | SLM | TAL | CLT | | | |
| 2003 | Mario Gosselin | 12 | Chevy | DAY | ATL | NSH | SLM | TOL | KEN | CLT; DNQ | BLN | KAN | MCH | LER | POC; 23 | POC; 36 | NSH; 1* | ISF | WIN | DSF | CHI | SLM | TAL | CLT; 14 | SBO | | | |
| 2004 | Mario Gosselin | 12 | Chevy | DAY | NSH | SLM | KEN | TOL | CLT | KAN | POC | MCH | SBO | BLN | KEN | GTW | POC | LER | NSH; 4 | ISF | TOL | DSF | CHI | SLM | TAL | | | |
| 2005 | Mario Gosselin | 12 | Chevy | DAY; 20 | NSH; 3 | SLM | KEN | TOL | LAN | MIL | POC; 23 | MCH; 35 | KAN | | | | | | | MCH; 10 | ISF | TOL | DSF | CHI; 33 | SLM | | | |
| 2005 | Dawayne Bryan | 12 | Dodge | | | | | | | | | | | KEN; 34 | BLN | POC | GTW | LER | NSH | | | | | | | | | |
| 2005 | Burney Lamar | 12 | Chevy | | | | | | | | | | | | | | | | | | | | | | | TAL; 6 | | |
| 2006 | Mario Gosselin | 12 | Chevy | DAY; 8 | NSH; 18 | SLM; 29 | WIN; DNQ | | TOL; 9 | POC; 2* | MCH; 8 | KAN; 22 | | | | | NSH; 1 | | | | | | CHI; 28 | | TAL; 38 | IOW; 30 | | |
| 2006 | Dawayne Bryan | 12 | Dodge | | | | | KEN; 11 | | | | | | | | | | MCH; 23 | ISF | MIL | | | | | | | | |
| 2006 | Justin Drawdy | 12 | Chevy | | | | | | | | | | KEN; 24 | BLN | POC | | | | | | | | | | | | | |
| 2006 | Corrie Stott | 12 | Pontiac | | | | | | | | | | | | | GTW; 24 | | | | | | | | | | | | |
| 2006 | Billy Shotko | 12 | Chevy | | | | | | | | | | | | | | | | | | TOL; 19 | DSF | | | | | | |
| 2006 | Billy Leslie | 12 | Ford | | | | | | | | | | | | | | | | | | | | | SLM; 24 | | | | |
| 2007 | Mario Gosselin | 12 | Chevy | DAY; 13 | USA; 12 | NSH; 36 | SLM | KAN; 4 | WIN | KEN | TOL | IOW | POC; 5 | MCH | | | | | | | | | CHI; 30 | SLM | TAL; 12 | | | |
| 2007 | Billy Shotko | 12 | Chevy | | | | | | | | | | | | BLN; 30 | KEN | POC | NSH | ISF | MIL | GTW | DSF | | | | | | |
| 2007 | Michael Phelps | 12 | Chevy | | | | | | | | | | | | | | | | | | | | | | | TOL; 20 | | |
| 2008 | Alli Owens | 12 | Chevy | DAY; 41 | SLM | IOW; 27 | KAN; 18 | CAR; 15 | KEN | TOL | POC; 24 | MCH; 24 | CAY | KEN; 15 | BLN | POC | NSH; 29 | ISF | DSF | CHI; 15 | SLM | NJE; 27 | TAL; 41 | TOL; 22 | | | | |
| 2009 | Mario Gosselin | 12 | Chevy | DAY; 34 | SLM | CAR | TAL | KEN | TOL | POC | MCH | MFD | IOW | KEN | BLN | POC | ISF | | | | | | | | | | | |
| 2009 | Darwin Greene | 12 | Chevy | | | | | | | | | | | | | | | CHI; 23 | TOL | DSF | NJE | SLM | KAN; 16 | CAR; 39 | | | | |
| 2010 | Russ Dugger | 12 | Chevy | DAY; 38 | PBE | SLM | TEX; 14 | TAL | TOL | POC | MCH | IOW | MFD | POC | BLN | NJE | ISF | CHI | DSF | TOL | SLM | KAN; 12 | CAR | | | | | |

=== Car No. 17 history ===
In 2014, DGM fielded the No. 17 Chevrolet for Alex Guenette at Talladega. He finished twentieth, two laps down.

==== Car No. 17 results ====
| Year | Driver | No. | Make | 1 | 2 | 3 | 4 | 5 | 6 | 7 | 8 | 9 | 10 | 11 | 12 | 13 | 14 | 15 | 16 | 17 | 18 | 19 | 20 | Owners | Pts |
|---|---|---|---|---|---|---|---|---|---|---|---|---|---|---|---|---|---|---|---|---|---|---|---|---|---|
| 2014 | Alex Guenette | 17 | Chevy | DAY | MOB | SLM | TAL; 20 | TOL | NJE | POC | MCH | ELK | WIN | CHI | IRP | POC | BLN | ISF | MAD | DSF | SLM | KEN | KAN | | |

=== Car No. 39 history ===
In 2012, DGM fielded the No. 39 Ford for Fain Skinner at Daytona. Skinner ran a consistent race, but was collected in an accident on the final lap of the event, finishing in fifteenth.

==== Car No. 39 results ====
| Year | Driver | No. | Make | 1 | 2 | 3 | 4 | 5 | 6 | 7 | 8 | 9 | 10 | 11 | 12 | 13 | 14 | 15 | 16 | 17 | 18 | 19 | 20 | Owners | Pts |
|---|---|---|---|---|---|---|---|---|---|---|---|---|---|---|---|---|---|---|---|---|---|---|---|---|---|
| 2012 | Fain Skinner | 39 | Ford | DAY; 15 | MOB | SLM | TAL | TOL | ELK | POC | MCH | WIN | NJE | IOW | CHI | IRP | POC | BLN | ISF | MAD | SLM | DSF | KAN | | |

=== Car No. 63 history ===
In 2006, Gosselin drove the No. 63 Chevrolet at Kentucky. He failed to qualify for the race

==== Car No. 63 results ====
| Year | Driver | No. | Make | 1 | 2 | 3 | 4 | 5 | 6 | 7 | 8 | 9 | 10 | 11 | 12 | 13 | 14 | 15 | 16 | 17 | 18 | 19 | 20 | 21 | 22 | 23 | Owners | Pts |
|---|---|---|---|---|---|---|---|---|---|---|---|---|---|---|---|---|---|---|---|---|---|---|---|---|---|---|---|---|
| 2006 | Mario Gosselin | 63 | Chevy | DAY | NSH | SLM | WIN | KEN | TOL | POC | MCH | KAN | KEN; DNQ | BLN | POC | GTW | NSH | MCH | ISF | MIL | TOL | DSF | CHI | SLM | TAL | IOW | | |

=== Car No. 71 history ===
In 2018, DGM fielded the No. 71 Toyota for L. B. Skaggs at Pocono. He finished fourteenth.

==== Car No. 71 results ====
| Year | Driver | No. | Make | 1 | 2 | 3 | 4 | 5 | 6 | 7 | 8 | 9 | 10 | 11 | 12 | 13 | 14 | 15 | 16 | 17 | 18 | 19 | 20 | Owners | Pts |
|---|---|---|---|---|---|---|---|---|---|---|---|---|---|---|---|---|---|---|---|---|---|---|---|---|---|
| 2018 | L. B. Skaggs | 71 | Toyota | DAY | NSH | SLM | TAL | TOL | CLT | POC; 14 | MCH | MAD | GTW | CHI | IOW | ELK | POC; 11 | ISF | BLN | DSF | SLM | IRP | KAN; 23 | | |

=== Car No. 72 history ===
In 2006, DGM fielded the No. 72 Chevrolet for Justin Drawdy at Nashville. Dawayne Bryan made two starts in the No. 72 Dodge. John Jackson made 3 starts in the No. 72 car. He failed to qualify at two races. Amanda Gogel made one start in the 72 car. Sisters Angela and Amber Cope both made one start in the 72 car. Justin South made 1 start at Talladega in the 72 car.

In 2007, J. R. Heffner made one start at Daytona in the 72 car. He finished 35th. Jackson returned for four races in the 72 car. He failed to qualify at one race.

In 2008, Bryan returned for one race at Daytona in the No. 72 Dodge. Jackson made a start at Talladega in the No. 72 Chevrolet.

==== Car No. 72 results ====
| Year | Driver | No. | Make | 1 | 2 | 3 | 4 | 5 | 6 | 7 | 8 | 9 | 10 | 11 | 12 | 13 | 14 | 15 | 16 | 17 | 18 | 19 | 20 | 21 | 22 | 23 | Owners | Pts |
|---|---|---|---|---|---|---|---|---|---|---|---|---|---|---|---|---|---|---|---|---|---|---|---|---|---|---|---|---|
| 2006 | Justin Drawdy | 72 | Chevy | DAY | NSH; 25 | | | | | | | | | | | | | | | | | | | | | | | |
| 2006 | John Jackson | 72 | Chevy | | | SLM; DNQ | WIN | KEN | TOL | POC; 30 | | KAN; DNQ | KEN | BLN | POC | GTW | | | | | | | | | | | | |
| 2006 | Dawayne Bryan | 72 | Dodge | | | | | | | | MCH; 36 | | | | | | | | | | | | CHI; 13 | SLM | | | | |
| 2006 | Amanda Gogel | 72 | Chevy | | | | | | | | | | | | | | NSH; 33 | MCH | ISF | | | | | | | | | |
| 2006 | Angela Cope | 72 | Chevy | | | | | | | | | | | | | | | | | MIL; 32 | | | | | | | | |
| 2006 | Amber Cope | 72 | Chevy | | | | | | | | | | | | | | | | | | TOL; 27 | DSF | | | | | | |
| 2006 | Justin South | 72 | Chevy | | | | | | | | | | | | | | | | | | | | | | TAL; 14 | IOW | | |
| 2007 | J. R. Heffner | 72 | Chevy | DAY; 35 | | | | | | | | | | | | | | | | | | | | | | | | |
| 2007 | John Jackson | 72 | Chevy | | USA; 8 | NSH | SLM | KAN; 34 | WIN | KEN | TOL | IOW | POC | MCH | BLN | KEN | POC | NSH | ISF | MIL | GTW | DSF | CHI; 20 | SLM | TAL; DNQ | TOL | | |
| 2008 | Dawayne Bryan | 72 | Dodge | DAY; 8 | SLM | IOW | KEN | CAR | KEN | TOL | POC | MCH | CAY | KEN | BLN | POC | NSH | ISF | DSF | CHI | SLM | NJE | | | | | | |
| 2008 | John Jackson | 72 | Chevy | | | | | | | | | | | | | | | | | | | | TAL; 25 | TOL | | | | |

=== Car No. 80 history ===
In 2015, DGM fielded the No. 80 Chevrolet for Russ Dugger. Dugger failed to make the race at Daytona. He went on to Talladega that same year and accomplished his career best finish of fifth, and then went to Kansas and after running as high as fourth late in the race, finished in eleventh.

In 2016, Dugger returned to Daytona in the 80 car but he failed to make the race again.

==== Car No. 80 results ====
| Year | Driver | No. | Make | 1 | 2 | 3 | 4 | 5 | 6 | 7 | 8 | 9 | 10 | 11 | 12 | 13 | 14 | 15 | 16 | 17 | 18 | 19 | 20 | Owners | Pts |
|---|---|---|---|---|---|---|---|---|---|---|---|---|---|---|---|---|---|---|---|---|---|---|---|---|---|
| 2015 | Russ Dugger | 80 | Chevy | DAY; DNQ | MOB | NSH | SLM | TAL; 5 | TOL | NJE | POC | MCH | CHI | WIN | IOW | IRP | POC | BLN | ISF | DSF | SLM | KEN | KAN; 11 | | |
| 2016 | Russ Dugger | 80 | Chevy | DAY; DNQ | NSH | SLM | TAL | TOL | NJE | POC | MCH | MAD | WIN | IOW | IRP | POC | BLN | ISF | DSF | SLM | CHI | KEN | KAN | | |
