= Dawayne Bryan =

American racing driver (born 1982)

- Born: July 23, 1982 (age 44); Lake Alfred, Florida, U.S.

ARCA Menards Series career
- 10 races run over 4 years
- Best finish: 47th (2006)
- First race: 2005 WLWT Channel 5 150 (Kentucky)
- Last race: 2008 ARCA 200 at Daytona (Daytona)
- First win: 2005 SK Hand Tool 200 (Chicagoland)
Wins	Top tens	Poles
1	3	0
- Statistics up to date as of December 6, 2022.

Dawayne Bryan (born July 23, 1982) is an American former professional racing driver. He competed in the ARCA Racing Series from 2005 to 2008 and earned one win at Chicagoland Speedway in 2005.

== Racing career ==
Prior to making his debut in the ARCA Re/Max Series, Bryan had competed in series like the SARA Late Model Series, World Series of Asphalt Stock Car Racing, and the CRA Super Series.

Bryan first made his ARCA Re/Max Series debut in 2005 at Kentucky Speedway, driving the No. 12 Dodge owned by Mario Gosselin, where he would finish 34th due to a crash late in the race. He would return to the series at Chicagoland Speedway, this time driving a family-owned No. 65 Dodge. After starting fifth, he would lead the last 35 laps on route to his first ARCA win ahead of David Ragan.

In 2006, Bryan would run six races, splitting time between his family-owned team and DGM Racing, earning a best finish of sixth at Kentucky. It was also during this year that Bryan attempted to make his NASCAR Busch Series debut at Homestead-Miami Speedway in the No. 68 Dodge for Bryan Racing, although he would fail to qualify.

Between 2007 and 2008, Bryan would solely run at Daytona International Speedway, finishing 11th in 2007 in the No. 63 Dodge for Bryan Racing, and finishing eighth in 2008 in the No. 72 Dodge. The latter start would be the last time he would compete in an ARCA race.

== Motorsports results ==
=== NASCAR ===
(key) (Bold – Pole position awarded by qualifying time. Italics – Pole position earned by points standings or practice time. * – Most laps led.)

==== Busch Series ====
NASCAR Busch Series results
Year	Team	No.	Make	1	2	3	4	5	6	7	8	9	10	11	12	13	14	15	16	17	18	19	20	21	22	23	24	25	26	27	28	29	30	31	32	33	34	35	NBSC	Pts	Ref
2006	Bryan Racing	68	Dodge	DAY	CAL	MXC	LVS	ATL	BRI	TEX	NSH	PHO	TAL	RCH	DAR	CLT	DOV	NSH	KEN	MLW	DAY	CHI	NHA	MAR	GTY	IRP	GLN	MCH	BRI	CAL	RCH	DOV	KAN	CLT	MEM	TEX	PHO	HOM; DNQ	N/A	0	

=== ARCA Re/Max Series ===
(key) (Bold – Pole position awarded by qualifying time. Italics – Pole position earned by points standings or practice time. * – Most laps led.)

ARCA Re/Max Series results
Year	Team	No.	Make	1	2	3	4	5	6	7	8	9	10	11	12	13	14	15	16	17	18	19	20	21	22	23	ARMC	Pts	Ref
2005	DGM Racing	72	Dodge	DAY	NSH	SLM	KEN	TOL	LAN	MIL	POC	MCH	KAN	KEN; 34	BLN	POC	GTW	LER	NSH	MCH	ISF	TOL	DSF				89th	290	
2005	Bryan Racing	65	Dodge																					CHI; 1	SLM	TAL	89th	290	
2006	Bryan Racing	63	Dodge	DAY; 33	NSH; DNQ	SLM	WIN																				47th	795	
2006	DGM Racing	12	Dodge					KEN; 11	TOL	POC								MCH; 23	ISF	MIL	TOL	DSF					47th	795	
2006	DGM Racing	72	Dodge								MCH; 36	KAN											CHI; 13	SLM	TAL	IOW	47th	795	
2006	Bryan Racing	72	Dodge										KEN; 6	BLN	POC	GTW	NSH										47th	795	
2007	Bryan Racing	63	Dodge	DAY; 11	USA	NSH	SLM	KAN	WIN	KEN	TOL	IOW	POC	MCH	BLN	KEN	POC	NSH	ISF	MIL	GTW	DSF	CHI	SLM	TAL	TOL	119th	175	
2008	Bryan Racing	72	Dodge	DAY; 8	SLM	IOW	KEN	CAR	KEN	TOL	POC	MCH	CAY	KEN	BLN	POC	NSH	ISF	DSF	CHI	SLM	NJE	TAL	TOL			97th	190	
