= ARCA races at Chicagoland =

ARCA Menards Series race at Chicagoland Speedway

Ashley Furniture 150

ARCA Menards Series
- Venue: Chicagoland Speedway
- Location: Joliet, Illinois, United States
- Corporate sponsor: Ashley Furniture
- First race: 2001
- Distance: 150 mi (241.402 km)
- Laps: 100
- Previous names: ARCA ReMax 200 (2001); ReadyHosting.com 200 (2002–2004); SK Hand Tool 200 (2005–2006); Chicagoland ARCA 200 (2007–2008); Ansell Cut Protection 150 (2009); Ansell Protective Gloves 150 (2010); Messina Wildlife Animal Stopper 150 (2011); Ansell ActivArmr 150 (2012-2014); Scott 150 (2015-2018); Bounty 150 (2019); Dawn 150 (2020)
- Most wins (manufacturer): Ford (6)

Circuit information
- Surface: Asphalt
- Length: 1.5 mi (2.4 km)
- Turns: 4

The Ashley Furniture 150 is an ARCA Menards Series race held at the Chicagoland Speedway in Joliet, Illinois.

== History ==
The logo when the race was cancelled in 2020

It was originally 201 miles until 2008, but was shortened to 150 miles the next year. It has supported NASCAR Truck Series Overton's 225 in 2009, 2010 and 2012 and since 2016 the NASCAR Cup Series Overton's 400. In 2020, the race was originally on the schedule but was cancelled due to the COVID-19 pandemic. The race was announced to return in 2026 before the full-ARCA schedule was released, along with the Pocono race. The race is notable for its parity, as there was never a repeat winner throughout the 19 races held at the track.

== Past winners ==
Year	Date	Driver	Team	Manufacturer	Race Distance		Race Time	Average Speed (mph)	Report	Ref
Year	Date	Driver	Team	Manufacturer	Laps	Miles (km)	Race Time	Average Speed (mph)	Report	Ref
2001	September 1	Ed Berrier	Cavin Councilor	Chevrolet	134	201 (323.478)	1:37:11	92.26	Report	
2002	September 7	Chad Blount	Braun Racing	Dodge	134	201 (323.478)	2:06:20	95.462	Report	
2003	September 6	Frank Kimmel	Clement Racing	Ford	134	201 (323.478)	1:55:47	104.16	Report	
2004	September 11	Kyle Krisiloff	Hendrick Motorsports	Chevrolet	134	201 (323.478)	2:04:25	96.932	Report	
2005	September 10	Dawayne Bryan	Bryan Racing	Dodge	134	201 (323.478)	2:00:08	102.957	Report	
2006	September 9	Steve Wallace	Rusty Wallace Racing	Dodge	134	201 (323.478)	1:58:20	101.915	Report	
2007	September 8	Michael McDowell	Eddie Sharp Racing	Dodge	134	201 (323.478)	1:52:03	107.63	Report	
2008	September 6	Scott Lagasse Jr.	Venturini Motorsports	Chevrolet	136*	204 (328.306)	1:57:18	104.347	Report	
2009	August 28	Justin Lofton	Eddie Sharp Racing	Toyota	100	150 (241.402)	1:21:04	111.02	Report	
2010	August 27	Patrick Sheltra	Sheltra Motorsports	Toyota	100	150 (241.402)	1:21:35	110.317	Report	
2011	June 4	Ty Dillon	Richard Childress Racing	Chevrolet	100	150 (241.402)	1:27:45	102.564	Report	
2012	July 21	Kevin Swindell	Venturini Motorsports	Toyota	100	150 (241.402)	1:03:47	141.103	Report	
2013	July 21	Corey LaJoie	Randy LaJoie Racing	Ford	100	150 (241.402)	1:09:57	128.663	Report	
2014	July 21	Mason Mitchell	Mason Mitchell Motorsports	Ford	100	150 (241.402)	1:21:50	109.98	Report	
2015	July 20	Ryan Reed	Lira Motorsports	Ford	100	150 (241.402)	1:15:54	114.068	Report	
2016	September 15	Chase Briscoe	Cunningham Motorsports	Ford	100	150 (241.402)	1:12:29	124.166	Report	
2017	September 14	Christopher Bell	Venturini Motorsports	Toyota	102*	153 (246.230)	1:19:55	115.327	Report	
2018	June 28	Michael Self	Venturini Motorsports	Toyota	102*	153 (246.230)	1:11:05	129.144	Report	
2019	June 27	Ty Majeski	Chad Bryant Racing	Ford	100	150 (241.402)	1:19:55	112.617	Report	
2020 – 2025	Not held									
2026	July 3	Connor Mosack	Pinnacle Racing Group	Chevrolet	100	150 (241.402)	1:15:0	119.947	Report	

- 2008, 2017 and 2018: Race extended due to a Green–white–checker finish.
- 2020: Race canceled and moved to Kansas due to the COVID-19 pandemic.
